= Jody (song) =

Single by Jermaine Stewart

from the album Frantic Romantic
- B-side: "Dance Floor"
- Released: 1986
- Genre: Pop
- Length: 3:40
- Label: 10 Records, Arista, Virgin
- Songwriters: Jermaine Stewart, Narada Michael Walden, Jeffrey Cohen
- Producer: Narada Michael Walden

Jermaine Stewart singles chronology
"Frantic Romantic" (1986)	"Jody" (1986)	"Don't Ever Leave Me" (1987)

"Jody" is a song by American singer Jermaine Stewart, released in 1986 as the third single from his second studio album, Frantic Romantic. It was written by Stewart, Narada Michael Walden and Jeffrey Cohen, and produced by Walden.

In America, the single became Stewart's most successful single on the dance charts, peaking at #9, and became his third single to enter the Billboard Hot 100, peaking at #42. In Canada, the single made a brief appearance on the chart, peaking at #81.

== Background ==
"Jody" was inspired by Jody Watley of American music group Shalamar, for which Stewart had been a backing vocalist and dancer in the early 1980s.

Watley went on to co-write two singles on Stewart's 1988 follow-up album, Say It Again: "Don't Talk Dirty to Me" and "Is It Really Love?," both of them with her husband at the time André Cymone, who co-produced and performed on the album.

== Release information ==
The B-side for the single, "Dance Floor", was also taken from the album Frantic Romantic. It was written by Stewart and Roy Carter. For the single, various remixes of "Jody" were released along with a limited edition 2x12" vinyl that included two remixes of "We Don't Have to Take Our Clothes Off".

== Critical reception ==
Upon its release, Neil Perry of Sounds called "Jody" "far superior" to the "nauseating" "We Don't Have to Take Our Clothes Off".

== Formats ==
7" Single

1. "Jody" - 3:40
2. "Dance Floor" - 4:43

12" Single (American/Canadian release)

1. "Jody (Dance Mix)" - 5:33
2. "Jody (Dub Mix)" - 6:09
3. "Dance Floor (Extended Version)" - 6:38
4. "Jody (Single Version)" - 3:40

12" Single (European release)

1. "Jody (Dance Version)" - 5:24
2. "Jody (Dub Version)" - 5:56
3. "Dance Floor" - 4:44

Limited Edition 2x12" Single

1. "Jody (Dance Version)" - 5:24
2. "Dance Floor" - 4:44
3. "We Don't Have To Take Our Clothes Off (Remixed Version)" - 5:45
4. "We Don't Have To Take Our Clothes Off (Remixed Dub Version)" - 6:40

== Chart performance ==
Chart (1986)	Peak position
Canadian Singles Chart	81
UK Singles Chart	50
U.S. Billboard Hot 100	42
U.S. Billboard Dance/Club Play	9
U.S. Billboard Black Singles	18

== Personnel ==
- Producer on "Jody" - Narada Michael Walden
- Producer on "Dance Floor" - John "Jellybean" Benitez
- Remixer on "Jody (Dance Mix)" - Arthur Baker
- Remix Engineer on "Jody (Dance Mix)" - Alan Meyerson
- Editor on "Jody (Dance Mix)" - Benji Candelario
- Remixer on "Jody (Dub Mix)" - Arthur Baker
- Remix Engineer on "Jody (Dub Mix)" - Alan Meyerson
- Editor on "Jody (Dub Mix)" - Benji Candelario
- Producer on "Dance Floor (Extended Version)" - John "Jellybean" Benitez
- Editor on "Dance Floor (Extended Version)" - Chep Nunez
- Remixer on "We Don't Have to Take Our Clothes Off" - Lewis A. Martineé
- Writers of "Jody" - Jermaine Stewart, Narada Michael Walden, Jeffrey Cohen
- Writers of "Dance Floor" - Jermaine Stewart, Roy Carter
- Writers of "We Don't Have to Take Our Clothes Off" - Narada Michael Walden, Preston Glass
