= Frantic Romantic =

Studio album by Jermaine Stewart
- Released: June 1986
- Recorded: 1985
- Studios: Tarpan Studios, Sigma Sound Studios
- Genres: R&B; soul; funk; dance
- Length: 41:13
- Labels: Arista (US); 10 (UK)
- Producers: John "Jellybean" Benitez; Narada Michael Walden

Jermaine Stewart chronology
The Word Is Out (1984)	Frantic Romantic (1986)	Say It Again (1988)

Singles from Frantic Romantic
- 1. "We Don't Have to Take Our Clothes Off" Released: May 27, 1986; 2. "Jody" Released: 1986; 3. "Don't Ever Leave Me" Released: December 1986

Professional ratings
Review scores
Source	Rating
AllMusic	4/5 stars
Record Mirror	4/5 stars
Sounds	2.5/5 stars

Frantic Romantic is the second album by American R&B singer Jermaine Stewart, released in 1986. The album includes Stewart's biggest pop hit, "We Don't Have to Take Our Clothes Off", as well as the minor follow-up hit, "Jody", for whom Stewart's former Soul Train dance-mate Jody Watley was the inspiration. The album was re-issued on CD on October 18, 2010 by Cherry Red in the UK.

== Reception ==
NME said of the producer, Walden, "He's done a passably lively production job here, although it takes some skill to disguise Stewart's patent lack of charisma; the man sings like a Tasmanian devil interrupted while grooming."

== Track listing ==
No.	Title	Writer(s)	Length
1.	"We Don't Have to Take Our Clothes Off"	Narada Michael Walden; Preston Glass	4:54
2.	"Dance Floor"	Jermaine Stewart; Roy Carter	4:45
3.	"Jody"	Stewart; Walden; Jeffrey Cohen	5:35
4.	"Versatile"	Stewart; Jakko J.	4:01
5.	"Frantic Romantic"	Glass; Walden; Glass	4:33
6.	"Don't Ever Leave Me"	Walden; Cohen; Stewart	5:03
7.	"Out to Punish"	Walden; Glass; Stewart	4:54
8.	"Moonlight Carnival"	Stewart; Jakko J.; Glass	3:47
9.	"Give Your Love to Me"	Stewart; Jakko J.	4:25

Note

- The single edits of "We Don't Have to Take Our Clothes Off" are 4:38 and 4:05.

European track listing

No.	Title	Writer(s)	Length
1.	"We Don't Have to Take Our Clothes Off"	Walden; Glass	4:54
2.	"Versatile"	Stewart; Jakko J.	4:01
3.	"Moonlight Carnival"	Stewart; Jakko J.; Glass	3:47
4.	"Don't Ever Leave Me"	Walden; Cohen; Stewart	5:03
5.	"Dance Floor"	Stewart; Roy Carter	4:45
6.	"Jody"	Stewart; Walden; Cohen	5:35
7.	"Give Your Love to Me"	Stewart; Jakko J.	4:25
8.	"Out to Punish"	Walden; Glass; Stewart	4:54
9.	"The Word Is Out"	Stewart; Julian Lindsay; Greg Craig	3:32
10.	"Frantic Romantic"	Glass; Walden; Glass	4:33
11.	"We Don't Have to Take Our Clothes Off" (Special Extended Version)	Walden; Glass	5:55
12.	"The Word Is Out" (West Mix – Extended Version)	Stewart; Lindsay; Craig	6:53

Outtakes:

- "Wear Out the Grooves", released on the Perfect soundtrack.
- "Don't Wait for the Boys" (written by Jermaine Stewart), released on Attention: A Tribute to Jermaine Stewart.

== Personnel ==
- Drums and drum programming: Narada Michael Walden
- Percussion: Gregory "G.G." Gonaway, Andy Narell, Mingo Lewis, Sammy Figueroa
- Bass guitar: Randy Jackson
- Synthesized bass: Randy Jackson, Walter Afanasieff, Preston Glass
- Guitars: Corrado Rustici, Eddie Martinez
- Keyboards, Synthesizers: Walter Afanasieff, Preston Glass, Jack Waldman
- Saxophones: Marc Russo, Russell Tubbs
- Trumpet and horn arrangements: Jerry Hey
- Programming: Narada Michael Walden, Walter Afanasieff, Preston Glass
- All instruments on "Give Your Love to Me" by Jakko J., GG Gonaway and Narada Michael Walden
- Mastering Bob Ludwig at Masterdisk

== Production ==
- Produced by Narada Michael Walden and John "Jellybean" Benitez
- Engineers: "Llama" Dave Frazer, Gordon Lyon, Stuart Hirotsu, Mary Ann Zahorsky, Michael Hutchison, Fernando Kral, Mark Roule, Nick, Don Peterkofsky
- Note: Back cover of album says "Produced, Reduced & Arranged By Narada Michael Walden.

== Charts ==
Chart (1986)	Peak position
Canadian Albums Chart	33
UK Albums Chart	49
U.S. Billboard 200	32
U.S. Billboard R&B/Hip-Hop Albums Chart	31
