= Lil' Chris (album) =

Studio album by Lil' Chris
- Released: 4 December 2006
- Recorded: 2006
- Genre: Pop; rock
- Length: 37:04
- Label: RCA
- Producer: Ray Hedges; Nigel Butler; Martin Brannigan

Lil' Chris chronology
Lil' Chris (2006)	What's It All About (2008)

Singles from Lil' Chris
- 1. "Checkin' It Out" Released: 24 September 2006; 2. "Gettin' Enough??" Released: 11 December 2006; 3. "Figure It Out" Released: 26 February 2007

Professional ratings
Review scores
Source	Rating
Teentoday.co.uk	3/5 stars

Lil' Chris is the debut self-titled album by British singer-songwriter Lil' Chris. The album was co-written by Lil' Chris and pop producer and songwriter Ray Hedges, alongside former member of Theaudience, Nigel Butler. Additional production also comes from Martin Brannigan (known for his work with Natalie Imbruglia). The album was originally due to be released on 9 October 2006, two few weeks after the single "Checkin' It Out" was released, but was delayed as the album was not complete, eventually being released on 4 December 2006.

== Background ==
Lil' Chris rose to prominence in January 2006 at the age of 15 after appearing in series two of Channel 4's Rock School. The TV show saw Gene Simmons (from the band Kiss) try to form a rock band out of a class of children attending Kirkley High School (now East Point Academy). In the series, Lil' Chris was immediately seen as a contender for the band after revealing that he could sing, play guitar, drum, and write songs. Eventually he was selected as frontman and lead singer in the lineup for the group (now named "Hoax UK" after the slogan on his cap). In the final episode the group went on to open for Judas Priest, Rob Zombie, and Anthrax at a concert in Long Beach, California. A week after the performance, Lil' Chris was contacted by record producers Ray Hedges and Nigel Butler, who appeared in Rock School to help the class with songwriting. Hardman went on to sign a record contract with RCA Records and released his debut single, "Checkin' It Out" in September 2006, which reached No. 3 in the UK Singles Chart.

After performing a cover of Justin Timberlake's "SexyBack" on BBC Radio 1's Live Lounge, he then released his debut album, Lil' Chris, in December 2006. He continued to promote and release singles from his album throughout 2007, as well as performing as a supporting act for McFly on their 24 date Up Close and Personal tour throughout the UK. Hardman also took part in BBC Three's Celebrity Scissorhands and made guest appearances in episodes of CBBC's SMart and TMi. In 2008 he hosted his own series, Everybody Loves Lil' Chris, for Channel 4.

== Recording ==
"Is There Anybody Out There (Kickin' Off)" was written by Hedges and Butler with the group during their time on Rock School, and is thus sometimes credited as being co-written by the group (then known as "Hoax UK"). The album version is slightly different from the version performed on the show. "Gettin' Enough??" has been compared to having a similar tone to that of "Ever Fallen in Love (With Someone You Shouldn't've)" by the Buzzcocks. "Rachel" was reportedly written about singer and personality Rachel Stevens. Hardman toured the UK, signing copies of the album, including a signing in his hometown at their Woolworths store.

== Critical reception ==
Danny McKenna of Amazon said of the album, "Having set out his pseudo-punk stall with his first single "Checkin' It Out", which hit number three in September 2006, Rock School winner Lil' Chris —a cheeky 16-year-old from Lowestoft, Suffolk, who looks three years younger but puts on live performances as if he were five years older – now offers the world his debut album. Allegedly penned whilst bunking off school, Lil' Chris continues its author's willful domination of the punk-pop sound with songs like "Is There Anybody Out There?", the electronically charged "Gettin' Enough??", "Me and My Life" and the quirky "Is She Ready". The results, as with the debut single, are mixed. Chris' brattish, high-pitched voice is full of unconvincing warbles and wails - it doesn't quite back up the supposedly angry stance as much as it should. The highly derivative songwriting also doesn't do much to convince, but while the project doesn't offer anything in terms of truly serious musical merit, Chris himself is full of youthful verve and does deliver on the entertainment front."

== Track listing ==
No.	Title	Writer(s)	Producer(s)	Length
1.	"Checkin' It Out"	Hardman, Hedges, Butler, Gary Osborne	Hedges, Butler	3:10
2.	"Gettin' Enough??"	Hardman, Hedges, Butler	Hedges, Butler	2:56
3.	"Is There Anybody Out There (Kickin' Off)"	Hedges, Butler	Hedges, Butler	2:37
4.	"Is She Ready?"	Hardman, Hedges, Butler, Osborne	Hedges, Butler	2:42
5.	"I've Been Had"	Hardman, Hedges, Butler, Osborne	Hedges, Butler	3:23
6.	"I Never Noticed"	Hardman, Hedges, Butler, Osborne	Hedges, Butler	3:01
7.	"Figure It Out"	Hardman, Hedges, Butler, Martin Brannigan	Hedges, Butler, Brannigan	2:54
8.	"Me and My Life"	Hardman, Hedges, Butler, Doug Drummond	Hedges, Butler	2:55
9.	"Fighters"	Hardman, Hedges, Butler, Drummond	Hedges, Butler	3:02
10.	"She Dances on the Stage"	Hardman, Hedges, Butler, Drummond	Hedges, Butler	3:21
11.	"Get Delirious"	Hardman, Hedges, Butler, Drummond	Hedges, Butler	3:24
12.	"Rachel"	Hardman, Hedges, Butler, Andy Caine	Hedges, Butler	2:33

Deluxe iTunes Store edition bonus tracks
No.	Title	Writer(s)	Producer(s)	Length
13.	"Me and My Life" (acoustic version)	Hardman, Hedges, Butler, Doug Drummond	Hedges, Butler	2:26
14.	"Crossing the Line"			2:41
15.	"Don't Ask [Cos It Kills Me]"			3:06
16.	"Gettin' Enough??" (J Dub Remix)	Hardman, Hedges, Butler	Hedges, Butler	3:34
17.	"Like You Know"	Hardman, Hedges, Butler	Hedges, Butler	3:50
18.	"I've Been Had" (Live in London)	Hardman, Hedges, Butler, Osborne	Hedges, Butler	3:40
19.	"Is She Ready?" (Live in London)	Hardman, Hedges, Butler, Osborne	Hedges, Butler	2:44
20.	"Rachel" (Live in Glasgow)	Hardman, Hedges, Butler, Caine	Hedges, Butler	2:36
21.	"Get Delirious" (Lil' Refix Mix)	Hardman, Hedges, Butler, Drummond	Hedges, Butler	3:24
