= What's It All About (Lil' Chris album) =

What's It All About?

Compilation album by Lil Chris
- Released: 6 October 2008
- Recorded: 2006–2008
- Genre: Pop rock; punk
- Length: 40:26
- Label: RCA
- Producer: Ray Hedges; Nigel Butler; Dougal Drummond (additional prod.)

Lil Chris chronology
Lil' Chris (2006)	What's It All About? (2008)

Singles from What's It All About?
- 1. "We Don't Have to Take Our Clothes Off" Released: 19 October 2007

What's It All About? is the second and final album by British singer-songwriter Chris Hardman, better known as Lil' Chris. The album was released on October 6, 2008, following the release of the album's lead and only single "We Don't Have to Take Our Clothes Off" more than a year earlier on October 19, 2007.

The album was in fact an incompleted studio album; only six songs were recorded for the project, before RCA Records pulled the plug on any further studio recordings following the poor performance of the album's lead single. However, for contractual reasons, RCA were required to honour Chris' two-album deal, and therefore decided to package the six recorded songs with seven songs previously released on his debut album, Lil' Chris.

The album was then subsequently launched alongside Hardman's Everybody Loves Lil' Chris TV series for Channel 4 in an attempt to boost sales, but only managed to peak at #94 on the UK Albums Chart. The album remains Hardman's last release before his death in 2015.

== Singles ==
"We Don't Have to Take Our Clothes Off" was released as the album's only single on October 19, 2007. The single was released as a download-only, as the CD single release was pulled at the last minute. The single was backed with live version of "I Never Noticed", a media virus remix and a live version of the previously unreleased track "Taste Me" (a studio version has never been released). The single peaked at #63 on the UK Singles Chart.

== Track listing ==
- All tracks produced by Ray Hedges and Nigel Butler.
- Additional production on "Fighters" and "Get Delirious" by Dougal Drummond.

What's It All About? track listing
No.	Title	Writer(s)	Length
1.	"Checkin' It Out"	Chris Hardman; Ray Hedges; Nigel Butler; Gary Osborne	3:09
2.	"What's It All About?" (previously unreleased)	Hedges; Butler; Jason Perry; Julian Emery	3:16
3.	"We Don't Have to Take Our Clothes Off"	Preston Glass; Narada Michael Valden	3:04
4.	"Gettin' Enough??"	Hardman; Hedges; Butler	2:56
5.	"Only Wish I Could" (previously unreleased)	Hardman; Hedges; Butler; Billy Reeves	3:02
6.	"Fighters"	Hardman; Hedges; Butler; Dougal Drummond	3:00
7.	"Great British Summer" (previously unreleased)	Hardman; Hedges; Butler	3:11
8.	"Is She Ready?"	Hardman; Hedges; Butler; Osborne	2:40
9.	"When I Hit Twenty" (previously unreleased)	Hardman; Hedges; Butler; Osborne	2:54
10.	"Big America" (previously unreleased)	Hardman; Hedges; Butler; Jodi Marr	2:24
11.	"Figure It Out"	Hardman; Hedges; Butler; Martin Brannigan; Andy Caine	2:53
12.	"Is There Anybody Out There?"	Hardman; Hedges; Butler	2:36
13.	"Get Delirious"	Hardman; Hedges; Butler; Drummond	3:24
Total length:			40:26

== Charts ==
Chart (2007)	Peak position
UK Albums Chart	94
