= Say It Again =

Say It Again may refer to:

- Say It Again (Jermaine Stewart album), 1988
  - "Say It Again" (Jermaine Stewart song), 1987
- Say It Again (Stacie Orrico album), an unreleased 2002 album
- "Say It Again" (Don Williams song), 1976
- "Say It Again" (Natasha Bedingfield song), 2007
- "Say It Again" (Marié Digby song), 2008
- "Say It Again" (Precious song), the 1999 United Kingdom entry for the Eurovision Song Contest
- "Say It Again", a song on Santana's 1985 album Beyond Appearances
- "Say It Again", a 1965 single by Terry Black
- "Sat It Again", a 2020 song by Onefour featuring A$AP Ferg
- Say It Again (film) a 1926 silent Paramount Pictures film starring Richard Dix

== See also ==
- Say It (disambiguation)
