= Clea (group) =

English girl group

- Origin: Northampton, England
- Genres: Pop; europop; EDM
- Years active: 2002–2007, 2022–2023 (Note: Indefinite hiatus)
- Labels: 1967; Upside
- Members: Lynsey Shaw; Emma Kelly; Aimée Kearsley
- Past members: Chloe Morgan

Clea are an English girl group whose members met on the television show Popstars: The Rivals in 2002. Chloe Morgan (née Staines), Lynsey Brown, Emma Beard and Aimee Kearsley decided to form a band after they were voted off the series. The name 'Clea' is an acronym of the first letter of each member's name.

== History ==
They initially had a management contract with Upside Management, a company set up by former BMG/Sony employees Denise Beighton and Simon Jones, and a recording contract with Warner offshoot 1967 Records. Their first single, "Download It", released in 2003, entered the UK Singles Chart at number 21, and the band spent the remainder of the year playing small concerts in the United Kingdom.

In February 2004, the band released their second single, "Stuck in the Middle," which reached number 23 in the UK Singles Chart. They continued playing, including appearances at Soccer 6 in Liverpool and Reading. In May of that year, Chloe Morgan left the group to pursue her solo career.

Clea's debut album, Identity Crisis was released in Russia, Eastern Europe, and certain countries in Asia. In these regions, the band had seen some moderate interest; however, due to being unsuccessful, they were dropped from 1967 Records in late 2004. Clea continued to be managed by Upside Management, and released music independently through a specially-created label.

In September 2005, Clea collaborated with production group Da Playaz to release a single, "We Don't Have To Take Our Clothes Off" a dance remake of the Narada Michael Walden song originally made famous by Jermaine Stewart. This single reached number 35 on the UK chart. "Lucky Like That", released in June 2006, was the band's fourth single. This single placed at number 55 on the UK chart. Trinity, Clea's second album (but first UK album) was released on 3 July on Upside Records. Lynsey Brown left the band in November 2006. They then released the double a-side single, "Stuck in the Middle"/"I Surrender", in Europe, and toured Asia and Scandinavia in 2007. They also signed to EMI China and toured there on several occasions.

In 2008, Kearsley and Beard rebranded under the name LoveShy and entered the bid to become the UK's representative in that year's Eurovision Song Contest. They competed in the program Eurovision: Your Decision with the song "Mr Gorgeous", however they were unsuccessful in their attempt. They later signed to All Around the World and released a handful of singles, including a cover of The Boy Is Mine.

In November 2022, all four Clea members reunited in celebration of their twentieth anniversary, and the group was officially added to the lineup of Mighty Hoopla 2023.

== After Clea ==
Chloe Morgan is currently living in Vancouver, Canada. Following the release of her debut solo EP, Piano Forté, Morgan began writing and recording in LA. She continues to release music, most recently in 2024, and also works as a DJ.

Aimee Kearsley, who now resides in London, has continued working in music as a songwriter since leaving the group. In 2011 she joined girlband Fanfair. Performing initially at rugby union games across the UK and performing at Twickenham Stadium, they went on to tour the UK and Ireland on The Wanted sell-out arena tour "The Code". The band was represented by 84 World, Dan Parker (formerly of Syco Entertainment). The band became brand ambassadors for Collection Makeup, releasing a single called "Mission" as part of a Collection TV commercial campaign in the UK. In 2013 the girls disbanded after failing to secure a record deal. Aimee is currently working as a music producer and songwriter in the UK.

Brown moved to Manchester and opened a hair salon.

Beard appeared as a contestant on Paris Hilton's British Best Friend, she made it to the finale and came third. Under the name Soraya, she recorded a new solo single, "Vanity"; the video to support the release was directed by Lauren Pushkin, and produced by PMA Digital.

== Discography ==
=== Albums ===
- Identity Crisis (2004)
- Trinity (2006)

=== Singles ===
Year	Title	UK Singles Chart	Album
2003	"Download It"	21	Identity Crisis
2004	"Stuck in the Middle"	23	Identity Crisis
2005	"We Don't Have to Take Our Clothes Off" (with Da Playaz)	35	Trinity
2006	"Lucky Like That"	55	Trinity
2006	"Stuck in the Middle" / "I Surrender"	—	Trinity
