= Stuck in the Middle (Clea song) =

Single by Clea

from the album Identity Crisis and Trinity
- Released: 16 February 2004 (UK); 2006 (Europe)
- Recorded: 2003
- Genre: Pop
- Length: 3:37
- Label: 1967
- Songwriter(s): Christian Ballard, Jane Vaughan, Obi Mhondera, Andrew Ian Murray, Sylvia Bennett-Smith

Clea singles chronology
"Download It" (2003)	"Stuck in the Middle" (2004)	"We Don't Have to Take Our Clothes Off" (2005)

"Stuck in the Middle" is a song by English girl group Clea, released in the UK as their second single on 16 February 2004. It was their second top 30 hit, charting at No. 23 on the UK Singles Chart. The girls performed the song on several shows, such as Top of the Pops. It appears on their international debut album, Identity Crisis, and was re-recorded for their UK debut album, Trinity.

== Music video ==
=== 2004 version ===
Clea filmed a video for this single, in black and white. The four girls are featured doing sexy moves and apparently hiding or looking for someone.

=== 2006 version ===
The "Stuck in the Middle" video was re-released in 2006, with a new recording of the song, removing the scenes in which former band member Chloe appeared, and adding new scenes with the three remaining members. The video was made to promote the European release of the double A-side single with "I Surrender".

== Track listings ==
=== 2004 UK release ===
CD single

1. "Stuck in the Middle" (radio edit)
2. "Reminisce"
3. "Stuck in the Middle" (Cutfather & Joe Mix)
4. "Stuck in the Middle" (Cutfather & Joe Mix feat. ODB)

DVD single

1. "Stuck in the Middle" (video)
2. "Reminisce"
3. "Stuck in the Middle" (8 Jam remix)

=== 2006 Europe release ===
CD single

1. "Stuck in the Middle"
2. "Stuck in the Middle" (Cutfather & Joe Mix feat. ODB)
3. "I Surrender"
4. "I Surrender" (Magic Mitch Radio)

== Charts ==
Chart (2004)	Peak position
UK Singles (OCC)	23

- "Stuck in the Middle" appears on their debut album Identity Crisis, released in some European countries.
- The song was re-recorded to appear on their UK debut album Trinity, without Chloe Staines' vocals.
- The re-recorded version was released as a double A-side with "I Surrender" in Europe in late 2006.
