= What's It All About =

What's It All About may refer to:

- What's It All About (Lil' Chris album), 2008
- What's It All About (Pat Metheny album), 2011
- "What's It All About" (song), a song by Run-D.M.C.
- "What's It All About", a song by James from the album Living in Extraordinary Times

== See also ==
- Alfie (Burt Bacharach song) opens with the phrase "What's it all about".
