= Attention: A Tribute to Jermaine Stewart =

Studio album by Jermaine Stewart
- Released: November 15, 2005
- Genres: Pop, R&B
- Length: 54:01
- Label: BFG Records

Jermaine Stewart chronology
Set Me Free (1992)	Attention: A Tribute to Jermaine Stewart (2005)	Greatest Hits (2005)

Attention: A Tribute to Jermaine Stewart is a posthumously-released compilation album from American R&B singer Jermaine Stewart, released in 2005. It features previously unreleased material and a selection of songs previously released, namely B-sides. Following the album's release, BFG Records would also release In Loving Memories of Jermaine Stewart: His Greatest Hits in 2011.

== Background ==
Shortly before his death, Stewart returned to the studio to record a new album titled Believe in Me. Although the album was not completed, some of the finished tracks surfaced on Attention: A Tribute to Jermaine Stewart, along with various other older tracks. The album was released by Stewart's brother Gene Stewart on his label BFG Records. Gene Stewart said of the album: "It's my pleasure to present, my tribute to my beloved brother. I had to undergo a very difficult visit to Los Angeles to move my brothers' belongings to Chicago. After finally getting all of his personal property settled here in Chicago, I managed to get the time to look through some of his items and came across some music tracks that never made the hit charts or just never been heard before. 12 songs became my favorites, and I felted like I must share these tunes with his fans as a special tribute in memories of him."

The album features twelve tracks, nine of which had never been heard or released before. "Imagine We're in Love" was originally the B-side to the 1988 single "Get Lucky", "Places" was the B-side of the 1988 single "Don't Talk Dirty to Me" and "Search" was the B-side to the 1989 single "Is It Really Love?". "Search", as "Search for Love", was also included that year as the B-side to the US single "Hot & Cold". All of these singles, with the exception of "Hot & Cold", were from the 1988 album Say It Again. The song "Lifestyle" is an alternative version of the song originally recorded during the sessions of the 1992 unreleased album Set Me Free.

== Track listing ==
No.	Title	Writer(s)	Length
1.	"Gone Are Those Days"		4:01
2.	"Places"	Jermaine Stewart, Roy Carter	4:33
3.	"Imagine We're in Love"	Stewart, Carter	3:58
4.	"Attention"		4:23
5.	"Search"	Stewart, Carter	4:24
6.	"Lifestyle"	Stewart, Jesse Saunders	5:40
7.	"Love You Til"		5:03
8.	"Your So Fine"		4:22
9.	"Up to Love"		3:34
10.	"Don't Wait for the Boys"		4:38
11.	"Believe in Me"		5:00
12.	"Better Than Him"		4:21
