= Lil' Chris =

English singer and television presenter (1990–2015)

- Lil' Chris performing in 2006

Background information
- Born: Christopher James Hardman; 26 August 1990; Lowestoft, Suffolk, England
- Died: 23 March 2015 (aged 24) Lowestoft, Suffolk, England
- Genres: Pop; rock; pop rock
- Occupations: Singer; songwriter; television personality; actor
- Years active: 2006–2015
- Labels: RCA Records; A D Records

Christopher James Hardman (26 August 1990 – 23 March 2015), known professionally as Lil' Chris, was an English singer-songwriter, actor, and television personality. He came to prominence in 2006 after appearing on the Channel 4 series Rock School, which saw Kiss vocalist and bassist Gene Simmons make a rock band at Lil' Chris' school. Later that year he released the single "Checkin' It Out", which charted at number 3, and a self-titled album. In 2008 he hosted his own series, Everybody Loves Lil' Chris. Hardman died by suicide in March 2015 at his home in Lowestoft after struggling with his mental health.

== Early life ==
Hardman was born in Lowestoft, the son of Ian Hardman, a slaughterhouse worker, and Karen Elizabeth Hardman (née Clarke), a supermarket worker. He had an older sister, Hannah, and a younger brother, Nathan.

He gained the nickname 'Lil' Chris' because his height was 4 feet 11 inches (1.50 m) at the age of 15. He was the shortest boy in his year at Kirkley High School.

== Career ==
=== Rock School ===
Hardman rose to prominence in January 2006 at the age of 15 after appearing in series two of Channel 4's Rock School. The show saw Gene Simmons (from the band Kiss) try to form a rock band out of a class of children attending Kirkley High School (now East Point Academy). In the series, Hardman was immediately seen as a contender for the band after revealing that he could sing, play guitar, drum and write songs. Eventually Hardman was selected as frontman and lead singer in the line-up for the group (now named "Hoax UK" after the slogan on Hardman's cap). In the final episode the group went on to open for Judas Priest, Rob Zombie and Anthrax at a concert in Long Beach, California.

=== Solo career ===
A week after the performance, Hardman was contacted by record producers Ray Hedges and Nigel Butler, who appeared in Rock School to help the class with songwriting. Hardman went on to sign a record contract with RCA Records and released his debut single "Checkin' It Out" in September 2006 which peaked at number three on the UK Singles Chart. After performing a cover of Justin Timberlake's "SexyBack" on BBC Radio 1's Live Lounge, Hardman then released his debut album Lil' Chris in December 2006. On 14 October 2006 he appeared in the Big Gig at Wembley Arena before 20,000 Girl Guides. He continued to promote and release singles from his album throughout 2007, as well as performing as a supporting act for McFly on their 24 date Up Close and Personal tour throughout the United Kingdom. Hardman also took part in BBC Three's Celebrity Scissorhands and made guest appearances in episodes of CBBC's SMart and TMi. He also appeared on the Weakest Link in 2007 but refused to sing in front of Anne Robinson when asked by the hostess. He was voted off in round 5.

More television work followed in 2008, including appearances on Hider in the House, Dani's House and Never Mind the Buzzcocks. Hardman also compered the 4Music stage of the T4 on the Beach music festival in July 2008. In October and November 2008 (after a successful pilot earlier in the year) he hosted Everybody Loves Lil' Chris on the T4 strand of Channel 4 on Saturday mornings. The show was a mixture of celebrity interviews, live music performances and various 'challenges' that he undertook. The airing of the show coincided with the release of Hardman's second album What's It All About in October 2008. He also supported Alphabeat on their Wolfbaggin' tour, throughout the UK.

Throughout 2009, Hardman made celebrity appearances as a DJ, visiting various venues around the UK. These included Zanzibar Club in Leicester in May 2009, and Tramps Nightclub in Worcester in August 2009. In October 2009 Hardman made a guest appearance on the BBC1 game show Hole in the Wall, and also featured in an episode of the second series of the CBBC comedy show Sorry, I've Got No Head. During December 2009 to January 2010, he presented the making of Remo Skilla's music video, Stoosh, which was posted on YouTube.

From 18 June to 14 July 2012, Hardman starred in Loserville: The Musical at the West Yorkshire Playhouse in Leeds in the role of Francis Weir. The musical transferred to the Garrick Theatre in London's West End from October 2012 to January 2013, with understudy Ashley Luke Lloyd playing the role of Francis Weir for the majority of the London run due to the indisposition of Hardman. After Loserville closed Hardman briefly worked for Anglian Home Improvements, selling their products door to door in Lowestoft. In October 2013, he announced via Twitter that he was working on a new album, his first since 2008. Hardman issued a new single for Christmas 2013 called "Christmas Number One (#FeedEmYellowSnow)" with Lloyd Wilkinson, and set off on a Christmas tour with Tom Mann and Giles Potter, from 2013's The X Factor. The tour was called The Lil' Chris-tmas tour. On 3 December 2013, the Official Chart Company listed "Christmas Number One (#FeedEmYellowSnow)" as a contender for the Christmas Number One spot on 22 December 2013, but the single failed to chart.

In 2014 Hardman launched MAML, his own alternative clothing label incorporating his own designs. The range was available for several months online and from a store in Hardman's home town of Lowestoft. He continued to write new material with producer Guy Barnes, which he hoped would be released in the summer of 2014, but by this time Hardman had no management or record label or distribution in place, so it was planned to release his summer anthem 'Louder' with other songs on an EP in 2015.

== Death ==
Hardman had depression alongside other mental health issues. In April 2014 he tweeted: "I hope to one day create a way out of depression that doesn't mean taking your own life. The Cure." In October 2014 he tweeted, "Depression really sucks. Learning how to notice it can save lives and your own feelings at times. Take time to understand it, for everybody." On 3 March 2015, Hardman tweeted, "Thinking about quitting music forever...there has to come a time eventually when I have to face reality. I'm just not good enough." The inquest into his death held at Bury St Edmunds in 2016 was told that he missed the limelight when his career stalled. Hardman died on 23 March 2015 at his Lowestoft home at the age of 24. His friend found him not breathing and called 999. Paramedics were called to his home, but they were unable to revive him and they declared him dead at the scene. Suffolk Police said they were not treating the death as suspicious. Tributes were given by people such as boxer Anthony Ogogo, who had attended the same school, and Gene Simmons. On 29 April 2015, it was reported that the cause of death was suicide by hanging.

A statement issued by his family on 30 March 2015 paid tribute to him:

"Chris was a huge personality who will be missed by everyone who knew him. He was a hugely creative person who used this side of his personality to make others smile, to cheer people up, and to make others feel better. If he wasn’t bringing joy through music he was telling jokes or pulling pranks. He was the sunshine on a rainy day, and could make friends the minute he walked into a room, making everyone smile with his gorgeous, cheeky face.

A real people person, he would always take the time to stop and talk, no matter who or when, and we are proud that he was so well thought of by all who knew him. So many commented on what a lovely, well brought up person he was, so polite and kind and a pleasure to know.

Chris had struggled with mental health issues and depression in recent years. He was committed to helping others find better ways of overcoming this illness and publicly said he wished to find a cure. Despite this, his concern was always his family and his friends, whose happiness was his priority."

Hardman's memorial service was held in Gorleston, near his home town of Lowestoft, on 8 April 2015, and was a private event for family and friends only; this short service consisted of speeches without hymns. Later that day a private funeral was held in Lowestoft. Those attending, who included James Bourne from Busted, were asked to wear green, which was Chris' favourite colour. Following the funeral, family and friends released green balloons at the Claremont Pier in Lowestoft.

== Discography ==
=== Albums ===
List of albums, with selected chart positions, sales figures and certifications
Title	Album details	Peak
Title	Album details	UK
Lil' Chris	Released: 4 December 2006; Format: CD, digital download; Label: RCA Records	54
What's It All About	Released: 6 October 2008; Format: CD, digital download; Label: RCA Records	94

=== Singles ===
- "Checkin' It Out" (September 2006) No. 3 UK
- "Gettin' Enough??" (December 2006) No. 17 UK
- "Figure It Out" (February 2007) No. 57 UK
- "We Don't Have to Take Our Clothes Off" (October 2007) No. 63 UK

== TV appearances ==
- Rock School
- Richard & Judy (part of No Comment)
- Harry Hill's TV Burp (part of No Comment)
- The Sharon Osbourne Show
- Blue Peter
- TMi: Festive Special 2
- The Paul O'Grady Show
- Hider in the House
- Everybody Loves Lil' Chris
- T4 on the Beach (2008)
- Dani's House
- Never Mind the Buzzcocks
- Hole in the Wall
- My Super Sweet 16 (UK)
- Weakest Link Celebrity Special
- Celebrity Scissorhands
- The Wall
- Sorry, I've Got No Head
- Newsround
- Sportsround
- The Late Late Toy Show
