= Trinity (Clea album) =

Studio album by Clea
- Released: 3 July 2006
- Genre: Pop, dance-pop
- Label: Upside

Clea chronology
Identity Crisis (2004)	Trinity (2006)

Singles from Trinity
- 1. "We Don't Have to Take Our Clothes Off" Released: 17 October 2005; 2. "Lucky Like That" Released: 12 June 2006; 3. "Stuck in the Middle/I Surrender" Released: 16 August 2006

Professional ratings
Review scores
Source	Rating
AllMusic	3/5 stars

Trinity is an album by the British group Clea. It was the first release following the departure of member Chloe Staines. Trinity, Clea's second album (their first and only album release in the UK) was released on 3 July 2006 on Upside Records.

In September 2005, Clea collaborated with production group Da Playaz to release a single, "We Don't Have To Take Our Clothes Off". This was a dance remake of the Narada Michael Walden song made famous by Jermaine Stewart. The single reached number 35 on the UK charts. "Lucky Like That" was the band's second single from this album and was released in June 2006. The single placed at number 55 on the UK charts.

In July 2006, Clea released "We Don't Have to Take our Clothes Off" in Hong Kong, under the label Ludavibe. The song had a lot of airplay, peaking at number 1 on the week of 23 July on the RTHK 2 radio chart. The song did not make an appearance on any other international radio charts.

The album Trinity was released in Hong Kong with a different packaging and a bonus CD including the videos for "We Don't Have to Take our Clothes Off" and "Lucky Like That", as well as four remixes of each song. Interest of the band has spread all around the area, including China, Philippines, India, and Australia.

== Track listing ==
No.	Title	Length
1.	"Eanie Meanie"
2.	"Lucky Like That"
3.	"We Don't Have To Take Our Clothes Off" (Da Playaz vs. Clea)
4.	"Reasons"
5.	"Download It"
6.	"Playing the Wrong Game"
7.	"Keep It Cool"
8.	"The Lie"
9.	"Stuck in the Middle"
10.	"Pretty Little Bad Girl"
11.	"Sprung"
12.	"Physical"
13.	"I Surrender"
14.	"Butterflies & Rainbows"
15.	"Freestyle"

Hong Kong CD2
No.	Title	Length
1.	"We Don't Have to Take Our Clothes Off" (Vigorous club mix)
2.	"We Don't Have to Take Our Clothes Off" (Tulinge club mix)
3.	"We Don't Have to Take Our Clothes Off" (Mister AJ Filter Mix)
4.	"We Don't Have to Take Our Clothes Off" (Mister AJ main mix)
5.	"Lucky Like That" (Uniting Nations club mix)
6.	"Lucky Like That" (D'Mou club mix)
7.	"Lucky Like That" (Kumuchi club mix)
8.	"Lucky Like That" (Mark Jason club mix)
9.	"We Don't Have to Take Our Clothes Off" (video)
10.	"Lucky Like That" (video)
