= Set Me Free (Jermaine Stewart song) =

Single by Jermaine Stewart

from the album Set Me Free
- Released: 1992
- Genre: Pop
- Length: 3:44
- Label: Reprise
- Songwriter(s): Jermaine Stewart, Jesse Saunders
- Producer(s): Jesse Saunders

Jermaine Stewart singles chronology
"Every Woman Wants To" (1990)	"Set Me Free" (1992)

"Set Me Free" is a song by American singer Jermaine Stewart, which was released in 1992 as the only single from his unreleased fifth studio album Set Me Free. It was written by Stewart and Jesse Saunders, and produced by Saunders. It reached No. 45 on the Billboard Hot Dance Maxi-Singles Sales chart.

== Background ==
"Set Me Free" was Stewart's debut single for Reprise Records and saw him embarking on a Hip Hop/House-influenced sound. "Set Me Free" was aimed at the club scene, with various remixes created by David Shaw and Winston Jones. When the single was met with limited commercial success, Reprise shelved the upcoming album of the same name. Stewart began recording a new album, Believe in Me, in the mid-1990s, but he died of AIDS-related liver cancer in March 1997 before it was completed.

== Music video ==
The song's music video was directed by David Florimbi and Rupert Wainwright, and produced by Paul Schiefer for Fragile Films, with Terance Power as the executive producer.

== Critical reception ==
On its release, Larry Flick of Billboard commented, "Long-absent Stewart switches labels with a slick, trend-conscious funk jam that benefits greatly from his warm and appealing voice. Tasty remixes inject a slinky, R&B-juiced house tone that could work equally well over urban airwaves and on club dancefloors."

== Formats ==
12-inch single

1. "Set Me Free" (Classical Club Mix) - 6:46
2. "Set Me Free" (Classical Club-Stremental) - 6:20
3. "Set Me Free" (Ambient House Mix) - 4:16
4. "Set Me Free" (Funky Dub Version) - 6:14
5. "Set Me Free" (Piano Trax) - 5:57
6. "Set Me Free" (Don't Call Me I'll Call U R&B Version) - 5:30

CD single

1. "Set Me Free" (I Gotta Go Single Edit) - 3:44
2. "Set Me Free" (Album Version) - 4:17
3. "Set Me Free" (Don't Call Me I'll Call U R&B Version) - 5:30
4. "Set Me Free" (Classical Club Mix) - 6:46
5. "Set Me Free" (Ambient House Mix) - 4:16

== Personnel ==
- Executive Producer – Benny Medina
- Keyboards – Cevin Fisher, Fred McFarlane, Peter Daou
- Producer – Jesse Saunders
- Co-producer – Jermaine Stewart
- Remixes of "Set Me Free", Additional Producer – David Shaw, Winston Jones
- Remixer of "Set Me Free (Ambient House Mix)" – Jesse Saunders

== Charts ==
Chart (1993)	Peak position
US Billboard Hot Dance Maxi-Singles Sales	45
