= Every Woman Wants To =

Single by Jermaine Stewart

from the album What Becomes a Legend Most
- B-side: "Holes in My Jeans"
- Released: 1990
- Genre: Pop
- Length: 3:52
- Label: 10 Records, Virgin Records
- Songwriter(s): Richard C. Scher, Dorothy Sea Gazeley
- Producer(s): Richard C. Scher

Jermaine Stewart singles chronology
"Tren de Amor" (1989)	"Every Woman Wants To" (1990)	"Set Me Free" (1992)

Alternative Cover
- 12" single cover of "Every Woman Wants To".

"Every Woman Wants To" is a song by American singer Jermaine Stewart, released as the second and final single in 1990 from his fourth studio album What Becomes a Legend Most. It was written by Richard C. Scher and Dorothy Sea Gazeley, and produced by Scher.

After the album's lead single, "Tren de Amor", only managed to enter the Top 100 in the UK, "Every Woman Wants To" met similar commercial success, and peaked at #95 in the UK, staying on the chart for the one week. This would be Stewart's last chart appearance in the United Kingdom, excluding the 2011 re-entry of his best selling hit "We Don't Have to Take Our Clothes Off".

A promotional video was filmed for the single.

The B-Side for the single "Holes in My Jeans" was taken from What Becomes a Legend Most. It was written by Stewart and Scher. The "New-New Mix" remix of "Every Woman Wants To" was created by the American producer Bryan "Chuck" New.

== Reception ==
Upon release, Music & Media commented: "Bouncy, brassy dance material that is less than spectacular but nevertheless highly programmable". Peter Kinghorn of the Newcastle Evening Chronicle wrote: "This rippling soul is even better than his big "We Don't Have to Take Our Clothes Off".

== Formats ==
7" Single

1. "Every Woman Wants To" - 3:52
2. "Holes in My Jeans" - 4:51

12" Single

1. "Every Woman Wants To (New-New Mix)" - 6:40
2. "Every Woman Wants To (Album Version)" - 4:24
3. "Holes in My Jeans" - 4:51

12" Single (Uk promo single)

1. "Every Woman Wants To (New-New Mix)" - 6:40
2. "Every Woman Wants To (New-New Mix)" - 6:40

CD Single

1. "Every Woman Wants To (7" Remix)" - 3:52
2. "Every Woman Wants To (New-New Mix)" - 6:40
3. "Holes in My Jeans" - 4:51
4. "Every Woman Wants To (Album Version)" - 4:24

== Chart performance ==
Chart (1990)	Peak position
UK Singles Chart	95

== Personnel ==
- Producer - Richard C. Scher
- Remixer of "Every Woman Wants To (7" Remix)" - Bryan "Chuck" New
- Remixer of "Every Woman Wants To (New-New Mix)" - Bryan "Chuck" New
- Additional Producer, Mixer of "Every Woman Wants To (New-New Mix)" – Bryan "Chuck" New
- Arranger of "Every Woman Wants To (New-New Mix)" – Bryan "Chuck" New
- Writers of "Every Woman Wants To" - Richard C. Scher, Dorothy Sea Gazeley
- Writers of "Holes in My Jeans" - Jermaine Stewart, Richard C. Scher
