= What becomes a legend most? =

What becomes a legend most? may refer to:

- An advertising tagline for mink fur from the American Legend Cooperative
- What Becomes a Legend Most, a 1989 album by Jermaine Stewart
- What Becomes a Legend Most: A Biography of Richard Avedon, a 2002 book by Philip Gefter
