= Rock School =

British reality television series

- Genre: Reality
- Presented by: Gene Simmons
- Country of origin: United Kingdom
- Original language: English
- No. of series: 2
- No. of episodes: 11

Production
- Running time: 30 minutes (Series 1); 60 minutes (Series 2)
- Production company: RDF Television

Original release
- Network: Channel 4
- Release: 30 September 2005 – 19 February 2006

Rock School (also known as Gene Simmons' Rock School) is a British reality television series starring Gene Simmons from the rock band Kiss, in which he has a short time to turn a class of schoolchildren into a fully fledged rock band, following which they had to perform in a supporting slot for a leading rock band.

Rock School was made by British production company RDF Media and was shown on Channel 4 in the United Kingdom, RTL 7 in the Netherlands, Channel Ten and Channel V in Australia, TVNZ 2 in New Zealand, VH1 in the United States and Latin America, TV 2 Zebra in Norway, Nelonen in Finland, TV4 in Sweden, Much Music in Canada, Vitaya in Belgium and ORF eins in Austria.

A comedy film with a similar theme, starring Jack Black, called School of Rock, was released in 2003, before the first series began. The creative team and Simmons insisted that they did not make the show because of the film, and that the show had been in the works since 2002.

== Series 1 ==
The first series was broadcast in the autumn of 2005 and took place at Christ's Hospital, a co-educational boarding school near Horsham, West Sussex, which is famous for its strong musical tradition. The chosen class of year 9 students were all classically trained and it was insinuated that they had no interest in rock music.

The band consisted of Josh (also known as "The Emperor") as lead singer, Dudley ("Dudders") as drummer, Jesse ("Bagpuss") as guitarist, Kwamé ("Mr. Cool") on keyboards and bassist Camilla (who refused to have a "rock name"). Stylists were Fiona ("FiFi") and Frances ("Francis"), while the stage managers were Lucien and Richard ("Mr White"). On 21 October, the manager, Rodney ("Rods"), revealed the band's name to be "The Class". After a difficult start, the band successfully played to a crowd of Motörhead fans at the Hammersmith Apollo, and in the final episode of the series The Class got an all-expenses paid trip to Los Angeles, where all the members came together to perform a special tribute of "God gave rock 'n roll to you" for Simmons in a local venue.

The highlight of the programme was arguably Josh, "Emperor", so-called because of his love of the game Warhammer. The 13-year-old sparked plenty of controversy among his classmates as his weird antics made him an outsider. A fluent speaker of Quenya and learning Klingon by the end of the series, Josh was completely tone-deaf but was chosen by Simmons for his determination and perseverance. Simmons confessed that he saw something of himself in Josh, as he had faced similar adversity as an outsider when growing up in New York City. Completely transformed by the experience, Josh saw himself as a rock god by the end of filming and had even grown his hair in homage to Queen guitarist Brian May; however, this new persona irritated his classmates, who thought his arrogance had got the better of him.

== Series 2 ==
Following strong international sales for the first series, a second series began filming in October 2005 at Kirkley Community High School in Lowestoft, Suffolk (now East Point Academy) and began airing on Channel 4 in the United Kingdom on Sunday 29 January 2006. A new twist to this series was that instead of classically trained musicians, Simmons was working with students from a comprehensive school. Unlike the first series the pupils were from year 11 rather than year 9. Their task at the end of the series would be to open for Judas Priest, Rob Zombie, and Anthrax in Long Beach.

In the first episode we meet Chris Hardman, also known as "Lil' Chris" (due to his diminutive stature), who can sing, play guitar, drum, and write songs. At the end of the first episode he goes on holiday with his family, causing Simmons to appoint Ellie Chapman as the replacement vocalist. The band, then "No Coment" and consisting of Ellie Chapman (vocals), Samanie Warren-Close (guitar), Lindsey Rose (bass), Jess Reid (keyboards) and Sammi Reeve (drums) spend the second episode preparing for their first gig, where they played to an audience of predominantly old age pensioners at a local bowls club, as well as worrying about their positions in the band upon Chris's return. Episode two also features Black Sabbath guitarist Tony Iommi, who was brought in by Simmons to inspire the group.

In the third episode, the band hold auditions for a backup drummer in light of Sammi's volatile temper and tendency to walk out on them. These auditions were open to both class members and select non-members as well. Simmons chooses an outsider Lauren Pashley, raising the suspicion that he was looking to form an all-female band. They go on tour with Chris and Ellie taking turns on vocals, but neither impresses Simmons, putting both of their positions into doubt. On the second show of the tour, the band were promised they would get to play "My Generation" as an encore with Ellie singing, but Simmons felt they had not sufficiently impressed the crowd and did not warrant the encore. Suzi Quatro also features in episode three, showing Lindsey some techniques on the bass guitar. As part of their final preparations the band gave a live performance in Golden Cross, Coventry.

In the final episode Simmons reveals the final line-up of the band, dropping an obviously devastated Ellie and opting for Chris, who he felt was more charismatic. He also renamed the band "Hoax UK", inspired by a slogan on Chris's cap. They successfully played their opening slot with their song "Kicking Off", written by Chris and classmate Rob:

I want to learn to fly, I want to climb so high, it's kicking off
Bought a ticket out this hole, play my rock and roll, we're kicking off
Gonna take my life, take my life to new levels, Going to shake it all up until my heart rate trebles

The lyrics may have been prophetic, as a week after the performance Chris was contacted by record producers Ray Hedges and Nigel Butler, who appeared in the show to help the class with songwriting. They worked with him on a song called "Checkin' It Out". The song was released as a single in September 2006 and reached number 3 in the UK Singles Chart. Chris went on to release an album in December 2006. The female members of the band:-Samanie Warren-Close, Ellie Chapman, Lindsey Rose, Lily Vincent and Lauren Pashley formed a band of their own known as The Upraw. Lauren and Lily left the band, but have been replaced by two new members; Toni Micklebrough (drums) and Katy (keyboard). They released a single called "Make My Way" in May 2006. According to The Upraw's website, Ellie and Katy have now left, with the three remaining members functioning as a three piece. The Upraw split up in December 2006.

Samanie, Ellie & Lily were also regular presenters on former UK cable television channel CharliiTV (also an RDF production) during most of 2006 alongside Luciana Caporaso & Desiree Skylark. Warren was the show's rock music/guitar tutor (aka "our resident rock chick"), claiming that Van Halen was her very favourite band, Chapman held down the educational side of stuff, dealing with struggling schoolchildren whilst Vincent played the role of the show's playworker, paired up with Skylark. Jessica Reid & Toni Micklebrough joined ‘’CharliiTV’’ in 2007.

When the class visited LA in the final episode, they had a tour around LA Guitar Center for inspiration. Ellie was unsure who Jimi Hendrix nor Eric Clapton were whilst Samanie held Eddie Van Halen's signature guitar. At the end of it all, the 12 students spent a whole day at Gene's $1,000,000 mansion.

The band (still referred to No Coment) also made an appearance on Harry Hill's TV Burp on 18 February 2006, performing Is There Anybody Out There? (Kickin' Off) where Harry dressed up as Chris joining in with the action. Appeared were Chris, Ellie (credited as Danielle), Sammi, Jess (as Jessica), Lindsey (Linde) & Samanie (Samantha).

Hardman was found dead at the age of 24 from suicide by hanging on 23 March 2015, after having suffered from depression as his career stalled in the years leading up to his death; he had considered taking his own life on previous occasions.
