= Don't Ever Leave Me =

Don't Ever Leave Me may refer to:

- Don't Ever Leave Me (film), a 1949 British comedy film
- Don't Ever Leave Me (Jermaine Stewart song), a 1986 single by Jermaine Stewart
- Don't Ever Leave Me (Connie Francis song), a 1964 single by Connie Francis
- Don't Ever Leave Me, a song from the 1929 musical Sweet Adeline
