= Tren de Amor =

Single by Jermaine Stewart

from the album What Becomes a Legend Most
- B-side: "When Sex Becomes a Religion"
- Released: 1989
- Genre: Pop
- Length: 3:51
- Label: 10 Records; Virgin Records
- Songwriters: Jermaine Stewart; Ian Curnow; Phil Harding
- Producers: Ian Curnow; Phil Harding

Jermaine Stewart singles chronology
"Is It Really Love?" (1989)	"Tren de Amor" (1989)	"Every Woman Wants To" (1990)

"Tren de Amor" (Spanish for "Train of Love") is a song by American singer Jermaine Stewart, released in 1989 as the lead single from his fourth studio album What Becomes a Legend Most. It was written by Stewart, Ian Curnow and Phil Harding, and produced by Curnow and Harding. "Tren de Amor" reached No. 97 in the UK and remained in the charts for three weeks. The song was also featured in the 1989 movie She-Devil.

A music video was filmed to promote the single and Stewart also performed the song on the German TV shows Peters Pop Show and Eurotops.

== Release ==
The B-side, "When Sex Becomes a Religion", was exclusive to the single, and was written by Stewart, Arnold Hennings and Vince Lawrence. A limited-edition version of the 7-inch single was released with an exclusive poster bag. The 12-inch vinyl included two remixes of "Tren de Amor", named the "Express Mix" and "A Capella Mix".

== Critical reception ==
On its release, Music & Media described "Tren de Amor" as a "beautifully produced slice of late 80s dance music with a killer chorus". Jennifer Grant of the Perthshire Advertiser felt it was a "nice enough record" with "plenty of ooh ooh aah aahs" and "a harmonica bit which sounds a touch like the old theme for The Old Grey Whistle Test." Robin Smith of Record Mirror commented, "Unfortunately, 'Tren de Amor' is nothing more than a tiresome piece of Scunthorpe Variety Club cabaret soul that doesn't quite stop at the station."

== Formats ==
7-inch single

1. "Tren de Amor" - 3:51
2. "When Sex Becomes a Religion" - 4:21

12-inch single

1. "Tren de Amor" (Express Mix) - 6:35
2. "Tren de Amor" (A Capella Mix) - 4:55
3. "When Sex Becomes a Religion" - 4:19

CD single

1. "Tren de Amor" - 3:51
2. "Got To Be Love" (The Cymone Mix) - 4:47
3. "Tren De Amor" (Express Mix) - 6:35
4. "When Sex Becomes a Religion" - 4:21

== Personnel ==
Production

- Phil Harding & Ian Curnow - producers and arrangers of "Tren de Amor", remixers of "Tren de Amor (Express Mix)"
- Arnold Hennings, Jermaine Stewart - producers of "When Sex Becomes a Religion"
- André Cymone - producer and remixer of "Got To Be Love (The Cymone Mix)"
- Phil Harding, Yoyo Olugbo - engineers on "Tren de Amor"

Other

- Bill Smith Studio - artwork design
- Mike Owen - photography

== Charts ==
=== Weekly charts ===
Chart (1989-1990)	Peak position
Italy Airplay (Music & Media)	5
UK Singles Chart	97
