= Say It =

Say It may refer to:

== Albums ==
- Say It (Born Ruffians album), 2010
- Say It (Britt Nicole album), 2007
- Say It (EP), by Ju-Taun, 2006

== Songs ==
- "Say It" (ABC song), 1992
- "Say It" (Booty Luv song), 2009
- "Say It" (Flume song), featuring Tove Lo, 2016
- "Say It" (Kids in the Kitchen song), 1987
- "Say It" (Tory Lanez song), 2015
- "Say It" (Voices of Theory song), 1998
- "Say It", a song by Blue October from the 2009 album Approaching Normal
- "Say It", a 2021 song by Choomba featuring LP Giobbi and Blush'ko
- "Say It", a song by Demi Lovato from her 2025 album It's Not That Deep
- "Say It", a song by Enrique Iglesias from the 2003 album 7
- "Say It", a song by Ne-Yo from the 2007 album Because of You
- "Say It", a song by Rihanna from the 2007 album Good Girl Gone Bad
- "Say It", a song by the Beastie Boys from the 2011 album Hot Sauce Committee Part Two
- "Say It", a song by T-Pain from the 2005 album Rappa Ternt Sanga
- "Say It", a song by Maggie Rogers from the 2019 album Heard It in a Past Life
- "Say It", a 2026 song by South Korean girl group AtHeart.

== See also ==
- Say It Again (disambiguation)
