= Lucky Like That =

Single by Clea

from the album Trinity
- Released: June 2006 (UK); 2006 (Europe)
- Genre: Pop
- Label: Upside Records

Clea singles chronology
"We Don't Have to Take Our Clothes Off" (2005)	"Lucky Like That" (2006)	"Stuck in the Middle/I Surrender" (2006)

"Lucky Like That" is a song by English girl group Clea, released in June 2006 as their fourth and final single in the UK. It was a minor hit, reaching No. 55 on the UK Singles Chart.

The song appears on their UK debut album, Trinity.

== Charts ==
Chart (2006)	Peak position
UK Singles (OCC)	55
