= Fox Wars (TV programme) =

- Genre: Factual
- Directed by: Leon Dean
- Narrated by: Rebecca Front
- Composer: Julian Stewart Lindsay
- Country of origin: United Kingdom
- Original language: English

Production
- Executive producers: Nick O'Dwyer; Samantha Anstiss
- Editor: Radek Sienski
- Running time: 45 minutes
- Production company: Landmark Films

Original release
- Network: BBC One; BBC One HD
- Release: 22 October 2013

Fox Wars is a British documentary that was first broadcast on BBC One on 22 October 2013. The documentary is about foxes in Britain, and shows people's stance on foxes.

== Reception ==
=== Ratings ===
Overnight figures showed that the documentary attracted 2.25 million viewers on BBC One. It was watched by 17.7% of television viewers during its original broadcast.

=== Critical reception ===
Fox Wars received positive reviews. Digital Spy and Metro chose the documentary as one of the TV picks of the day. The Guardian journalist John Crace was surprised to learn that Britain has only 33,000 urban foxes and said:

Fox Wars felt genuine. It may not have been, of course, but credit to the director and producer for succeeding in making an usual slice of people's lives look that way. My favorite person was Janet. After staying up all night hoping to bash a fox over the head with a curtain pole, she later found out it had been a cat pissing on her lawn all along. Sign her up for a second series.

Michael Hogan of The Daily Telegraph gave the documentary four out of five stars and agreed that watching foxes was more interesting that half of the programmes on television. Andrew Billen, a television reviewer for The Times, also gave the documentary four out of five stars and called it "fascinating". Radio Times said:

This is the kind of documentary where the voiceover has no choice but to begin "Love them or hate them..." because that’s the whole gist of the story: some of us despise foxes as a pest and livestock killer; others, like Nobby in Barnet, rattle cans of dog food by the back door".
