= Say It Again (Jermaine Stewart song) =

Song written by Bunny Sigler and Carol Davis

"Say It Again" is a song written by Bunny Sigler and Carol Davis. It was originally recorded and released as a single by American singer Shawn Christopher in 1983. In 1984, American singer Lou Rawls recorded a version for his album Close Company. In 1985, American singer Rége Burrell released his own version of the song as a single from his album Victim of Emotion. In 1986, American female R&B vocal trio Sinnamon recorded their own version, which was released as a single. The best-known version is the 1987 recording by American singer Jermaine Stewart, released as a hit single from his album of the same name.

== Jermaine Stewart version ==
"Say It Again"

Single by Jermaine Stewart

from the album Say It Again
- B-side: "You Promise"
- Released: 28 December 1987 (UK)
- Genre: R&B, pop-funk
- Length: 4:07
- Label: 10 Records, Arista Records
- Songwriters: Bunny Sigler, Carol Davis
- Producers: Aaron Zigman, Jerry Knight

Jermaine Stewart singles chronology
"Don't Ever Leave Me" (1987)	"Say It Again" (1987)	"Get Lucky" (1988)

In 1987, Jermaine Stewart recorded "Say It Again" for his third studio album, Say It Again, with production by Aaron Zigman and Jerry Knight.

Continuing the commercial success of his 1986 hit "We Don't Have to Take Our Clothes Off", "Say It Again" was a hit in the United States and Europe. It was released in the UK on 28 December 1987 and peaked at No. 7 the following month. In Europe, it was a Top 10 hit in Norway, and a Top 30 hit in the Netherlands. In the US, the single was released in March 1988 and reached No. 27 on the Billboard Hot 100 in May 1988.

A music video was filmed to promote the single. Stewart also performed the song on the popular UK music show Top of the Pops with his backing band "The Party" in February 1988. In the US, Stewart performed the song on American TV show Soul Train.

The single's B-side, "You Promise", was exclusive to the single, and was written by Stewart and Roy Carter.

=== Critical reception ===
Upon release, Cash Box listed the single as one of their "feature picks" during March 1988. They commented: "Stewart has about the brightest sounding voice in R&B, and it pokes through any kind of speaker, static, player and mental blockage. If he can't pierce through to the top 10 with this little pin-prick of a hit, we'd be shocked." In his 2015 book The Top 40 Annual 1988, James Masterton described the song as "one of the more enduring pop hits of the winter months" and noted the song's "clever production" and "expected Aaron Zigman-produced pop funk".

=== Formats ===
7" single

1. "Say It Again" - 4:07
2. "You Promise" - 4:47

12" single (US release)

1. "Say It Again (Extended Remix)" - 8:30
2. "You Promise" - 4:46
3. "Say It Again (Single Version)" - 4:07
4. "We Don't Have To Take Our Clothes Off (Extended Dance Mix)" - 5:54

12" single (European release)

1. "Say It Again (Extended Remix)" - 8:30
2. "Say It Again" - 4:07
3. "You Promise" - 4:47

CD single

1. "Say It Again" - 3:49
2. "We Don't Have To Take Our Clothes Off" - 4:04
3. "Dress It Up" - 4:42
4. "You Promise" - 4:47

=== Charts ===
Chart (1988)	Peak position
Belgian Singles Chart	31
Canadian Singles Chart	44
Dutch Singles Chart	27
Irish Singles Chart	8
Italy Airplay (Music & Media)	8
Norwegian Singles Chart	10
UK Singles Chart	7
US Billboard Hot 100	27
US Billboard Hot Black Singles	15

=== Personnel ===
- Jermaine Stewart - vocals
- Jerry Knight - instruments
- Aaron Zigman - instruments
- Bill Reichenbach, Gary Grant, Jerry Hey, Kim Hutchcroft - horns
- Deniece Williams, James Ingram, Jerry Knight, Josie James, Marva King, Pam Hutchinson, Wanda Vaughn - backing vocals

Production

- Aaron Zigman, Jerry Knight - producers of "Say It Again"
- Csaba Petocz, Gary Wagner - engineers on "Say It Again"
- John Arrias - additional engineer on "Say It Again"
- Mick Guzauski - mixing and recording on "Say It Again"
- Phil Harding - additional production, mixing on "Say It Again (Extended Remix)"
- Ian Curnow - additional production and Fairlight programming on "Say It Again (Extended Remix)"
- Jermaine Stewart, Roy Carter - producers of "You Promise"
- Narada Michael Walden - producer of "We Don't Have to Take Our Clothes Off"

Other

- Bill Smith Studio - sleeve design
- Mark Le Bon - photography
