= Download It =

2003 single

Single by Clea

from the album Identity Crisis & Trinity
- Released: 22 September 2003
- Recorded: 2003
- Genre: Pop
- Length: 4:06
- Label: 1967
- Songwriters: Christian Ballard, Andrew Ian Murray, Tom Nichols

Clea singles chronology
"Download It" (2003)	"Stuck in the Middle" (2004)

"Download It" is the debut single by English girl group Clea. It was released in the UK on 22 September 2003 and just missed the top 20 charting at No. 21. The single was performed on Top of the Pops and appears on their international debut album, Identity Crisis. The song was re-recorded for their UK debut album Trinity, although Morgan's vocals were not added, likely due to her departure from the band in 2004.

== Music video ==
Clea filmed a video for this single in Vancouver, Canada, with four girls in a house as if they were digital humans or similar. It does not have a proper plot, but it can be inferred that they are watching someone. The video appears on the DVD single.

Another version of the video was released without Chloe Morgan, who left in May 2004.

== Track listings and formats ==
- CD single
1. "Download It [radio edit]"
2. "Mind Games"
3. "Download It [Sergio mix]"
- DVD single
1. "Download It [video]"
2. "Mind Games"
3. "Download It [Cicada remix]"
4. "Download It [Behind the Scenes]"
5. "Photo Gallery, Bio, Lyrics"

== Charts ==
Chart (2003)	Peak position
UK Singles Chart (OCC)	21
Poland (Polish Airplay Chart)	18
