= The Word Is Out (song) =

1984 song by Jermaine Stewart

Single by Jermaine Stewart

from the album The Word Is Out
- Released: 1984
- Genre: Dance-pop
- Length: 4:01
- Label: 10; Arista (US)
- Songwriter(s): Jermaine Stewart; Julian Lindsay; Greg Craig
- Producer(s): Peter Collins

Jermaine Stewart singles chronology
"The Word Is Out" (1984)	"Get Over It" (1984)

"The Word Is Out" is a song by American singer Jermaine Stewart, which was released in 1984 as the lead single from his debut studio album The Word Is Out. The song was written by Stewart, Julian Lindsay and Greg Craig, and produced by Peter Collins. "The Word Is Out" peaked at No. 41 on the US Billboard Hot 100 in March 1985.

== Music video ==
The song's music video was shot in Paris. The dance sequences were shot in the settings of both an aerobic class and nightclub.

== Critical reception ==
On its release, Billboard noted, "Collins borrows the Shannon sound for a high-voltage setting." Radio Luxembourg DJ Mike Hollis, writing for the Daily Mirror, described the song as "a good one" and predicted it would be a hit in the UK. Mat Snow of New Musical Express considered "The Word Is Out" to be a "mildly attractive sub-Junior song".

Mark Cooper of Number One felt the song was "very contemporary" but "rather bland". He stated, "Stewart launches his solo career with one of those dance records, all synths and drum machines thumping away like a dentist with an extractor." Graham K of Record Mirror was unfavourable, writing, "I really don't think that nicking the Art of Noise's megalithic beat box theories will rescue a no-no tune." In a retrospective review of The Word Is Out album, Dan LeRoy of AllMusic noted the song's "crunching, big-beat chorus".

== Track listing ==
7–inch single (10 Records release)

1. "The Word Is Out" – 3:30
2. "The Word Is Out" (Instrumental) – 4:33

7–inch single (Arista Records US release)

1. "The Word Is Out" – 3:27
2. "Month of Mondays" – 3:27

12–inch single (Arista Records US release)

1. "The Word Is Out" (Extended Version) – 6:52
2. "The Word Is Out" (Dub Version) – 7:04

12–inch single (Arista Records US promo release)

1. "The Word Is Out" (Extended Version) – 6:52
2. "The Word Is Out" (Dub Version) – 7:04
3. "The Word Is Out" (Short Version) – 3:30

12–inch single (10 Records release)

1. "The Word Is Out" (West Mix - Extended Version) – 6:52
2. "The Word Is Out" – 3:30
3. "The Word Is Out" (East Mix - Extended Version) – 7:00

== Personnel ==
Production

- Peter Collins – producer
- Julian Mendelsohn – engineer

Other

- Max Vadukal – photography
- Da Gama – cover design

== Charts ==
Chart (1984–85)	Peak position
UK Singles Chart	144
US Billboard Hot 100	41
US Dance Club Songs (Billboard)	4
US Hot R&B/Hip-Hop Songs (Billboard)	17
US Cash Box Top 100 Pop Singles	37
US Cash Box Top 100 Black Contemporary Singles	17
