= Lift Unity City =

Location
- Ormesby Road; Middlesbrough, North Yorkshire, TS3 8RE; England; 54°33′23″N 1°11′52″W

Information
- Former name: Unity City Academy
- Type: Academy
- Motto: A learning community (old) "To make our best better" new since September 2012
- Established: 2003
- Local authority: Middlesbrough
- Department for Education URN: 133768 Tables
- Ofsted: Reports
- Principal: Jill Gray
- Gender: Coeducational
- Age: 11 to 16
- Houses: Adventure, Discovery, Endeavour, Resolution. In theme of Captain Cook Ships
- Colours: green, red, orange, indigo, yellow, pink
- Registered company number (England and Wales): 4357009
- Registered charity number (England and Wales): 1091063
- Website: https://www.liftunitycity.org/

Lift Unity City is a city academy in Middlesbrough, North Yorkshire, England, sponsored by the Academies Enterprise Trust.

== History ==
Unity City Academy opened in 2003. It was formed by the merger of Keldholme School and Langbaurgh School, sponsored by support services company Amey plc. The funding for the Academy consisted of £8 million from the Department for Education and £2 million from the sponsor, Amey. The Academy was built for 1,200 pupils, although the February 2014 OFSTED report states that the Academy had only 671 pupils. In 2016, it has only 624 pupils recorded. After opening, the Academy went through a period of difficulty, including being placed in Special Measures in 2005.

In September 2006 the academy was relaunched as a Vocational and Enterprise Centre, following the building of a new enterprise centre funded by the Department for Education and Skills. In 2009, The school was declared inadequate by OFSTED and placed in Special Measures for a second time. In order to raise standards, the Department for Education intervened. A Chief Executive, a Director of Education and an Executive Principal (David Fuller) were appointed.

Former longtime Sunderland A.F.C. Women captain Stephanie Bannon balanced semi-professional football alongside teaching physical education (PE) at the academy throughout much of her career before retiring from football to spend more time with those close to her and focus on her work as a teacher at the school.

The Academy improved and in March 2013 was graded as 'Good' by OFSTED, but by January 2016 it had been given a warning notice by the Department for Education for "unacceptably low standards." The Academy has changed sponsor twice. It also went through a highly unusual 14-month period when it had no sponsor at all, and it is one of very few academies to have been declared by OFSTED to be 'inadequate' on three separate occasions: 2005, 2009 and 2016.

== Academic standards ==
This table shows the proportion of pupils achieving 5 GCSEs A-C (including English and Maths). Data is taken from the Department for Education School and College Performance Tables, and the school website.

| | 2011 | 2012 | 2013 | 2014 | 2015 | 2016 |
|---|---|---|---|---|---|---|
| National maintained school results | 59% | 59% | 60% | 57% | 56% | 59% |
| Unity City Academy results | 25% | 48% | 34% | 34% | 26% | 19% |

The minimum standard for an English school (known as the 'floor target') is 40% 5A-C (including English and Maths). Unity City Academy has missed that target for four years between 2012 and 2016, with results declining year on year. The academy went from being in the bottom third of schools in 2013, to being in the bottom 10% of schools in 2016.

In 2015, the Principal, Neil Powell stated "Within the next three years, Unity City Academy will be rated as an Outstanding Academy with students achieving excellent GCSE results." In reality, results collapsed to their lowest level and in 2016 OFSTED stated: "...Teachers have not had the guidance or training they need to address the significant gaps in pupils’ knowledge, understanding and skills...Pupils do not get enough good-quality teaching to help them catch up."

== Principals of the Academy ==
Between 2008 and 2015 Patricia Towey was the principal.

In 2015, Richard Harrison, the school's vice principal, took over leadership of the school, with Sue Hare as executive principal to raise standards. Sue Hare was an AET principal who had led Gillbrook Academy and Eston Park Academy, both of which schools had been declared inadequate by OFSTED.

At the end of 2015 the next principal was Neil Powell, who had previously been an AET Principal at East Point Academy in Lowestoft. He had qualified as a teacher in 2011 and led East Point Academy during a period of collapsing exam results, from 41% (5ACEM) to 39% and then to 32%. Despite threatening to resign if the Academy was taken over by the Inspiration Trust, the takeover went ahead and exam results immediately improved at East Point. Mr Powell has been cited as being "instrumental in bringing... (his former school East Point Academy) out of special measures, however the OFSTED report for East Point Academy notes that it came out of Special Measures in the year after he left his post there as Principal.

Under Mr Powell's leadership, results at Unity City Academy declined. He stated:

The results last year were not what I would have expected. I feel a moral draw to work in schools in which I can help to raise aspirations and achievement of the pupils in them.

Following the Jan 2016 DfE letter complaining about 'unacceptably low standards' at Unity City Academy Mr Powell resigned and left in April 2016, returning to East Anglia in September 2016 as headteacher of North Walsham High School.

In 2016 the new principal was Gemma Simon, supported by David Fuller (AET Executive Principal) David Fuller has worked to raise standards at Unity City Academy for 5 years, from 2012 to 2017. During this period exam results have collapsed to place the school in the lowest achieving 10% in England and OFSTED has graded the school as inadequate. David Fuller responded by stating: "Although our improvement plans have already had impact there is no room for complacency. We are totally focussed on ensuring that UCA continues on its present journey to become recognised as a ‘good school’.

| Principal | From | To | Notes |
|---|---|---|---|
| Eddie Brady | 2002 | 2004 | |
| Lesley Humphries | 2004 | 2005 | Acting principal |
| Martin Lang | 2005 | 2006 | |
| Robert Dore | 2006 | 2008 | |
| Patricia Towey | 2008 | 2014 | |
| Richard Harrison | 2014 | 2015 | |
| Neil Powell | 2015 | 2016 | |
| Gemma Simon | 2016 | 2018 | |
| Andy Rodgers | 2018 | 2022 | |
| Gemma Simon | 2022 | 2025 | |
| Jill Gray | 2025 | Present | |

== Extracurricular life ==
Concerns were raised in 2014 about how narrow the curriculum was at Unity City Academy and how such a narrow curriculum can damage children's employment prospects. For example, it was found that two local schools, one of which was Unity City Academy, had just 1% of pupils achieving the curriculum breadth known as the English Baccalaureate.

The Academy has a wide range of activities in place which include learning about road safety. The Academy achieved a 5* rating from the British Safety Council for its procedures to keep children safe.

== Controversy over OFSTED inspections ==
Despite the history of falling grades and declining standards OFSTED judged that Unity City Academy was good in 2013. In February 2014 OFSTED went on to state: "Overall, during their time at the academy, students make good progress in a range of subjects and their attainment in their best eight subjects is significantly above the national average. A similar picture is evident for all key groups of students, including those supported by pupil premium funding and those with additional learning needs"

The reality was very different and the UK Department for Education (DfE) had to intervene and contradict OFSTED's judgement. The DfE wrote to the academy complaining of "unacceptably low standards" stating, "...The Academy has had three consecutive years with poor results...Not enough pupils make or exceed expected levels of progress... In 2013 English and maths were both considerably below national medians..."

The intervention of the DfE to correct OFSTED was highly unusual and it suggests that when OFSTED judged that the Academy was inadequate in 2005, 2009 and 2016, the intervening judgement that it was 'good' in 2013 was a rogue and mistaken judgement, based on factors stated in the OFSTED reports which were later shown to be false.

For example, OFSTED's judgements about the leadership and management of the academy were excessively optimistic when they stated in 2014 that "Systems to check the quality of teaching and students’ achievement are extensive and rigorous..."(Ofsted 2014). OFSTED's own reports included examples of excessively optimistic predictions of exam results, and when declaring the academy to be inadequate in 2016 it explicitly contradicts its earlier judgements by stating that the monitoring of teaching was not good enough. Furthermore, as well as data showing falsely optimistic exam predictions in 2014, internal reports by Beverley Perin to the AET board showed that the Academy was still over-predicting its results two years later in 2016.

Problems in the OFSTED system are still apparent as late as May 2017. The OFSTED report talks of the sponsor AET taking "prompt" action to solve problems in the Academy, but by that time AET has been the sponsor for 6 years, overseeing 4 years of declining standards. The OFSTED report also comments positively upon changes to improve the governing body, because "... the previous governing body... was not sufficiently checked by the Academies Enterprise Trust... As a result, the previous governing body was dissolved in March 2017..." Yet an analysis of the composition of the previous governing body shows that the former CEO of AET himself, Ian Comfort, was a governor of unity city academy and that one of the other AET trustees, Mr Adam Gaunt was also a governor and trustee during the period of declining results. It is difficult to see, therefore, how OFSTED can accurately think that the previous governing body was not being checked by the trustees.

== Role of the sponsor ==
As an AET school Unity City Academy belongs to a multi-academy trust network of schools, which has been criticised by OFSTED for having low expectations and for letting down poor pupils and by the Educational Funding Agency as having poor financial controls. (For further evidence see the Academies Enterprise Trust page).

Academies Enterprise Trust support for Academies at the local level is led by the AET Regional Director of Education (known as a RDE). The 2014 OFSTED report about AET explained that "some academy leaders said that there was too much variability in the support and challenge offered by Regional Directors employed by AET."

Unusually, Unity City Academy receives extra help and support from the Academies Enterprise Trust. The CEO has directly and personally been involved in leading improvements at the Academy during its period of collapsing exam results, as a governor and trustee of Unity City Academy since 9 September 2013. In the February 2014 OFSTED Section 8 inspection, OFSTED praised the governors stating, "The governing body provides effective challenge, with high levels of scrutiny of the academy’s work evident... The collaborative work of the governing body, academy leaders and the sponsor is a real strength and enables the academy to focus sharply at all times on the improvement agenda." However, despite OFSTED's positive assessment, exam results continued to decline after their inspection, at 34% (2014) 26% (2015) and 19% (2016). There is surprise about how OFSTED could have concluded that, "The quality of leadership and management is good...Effective teaching allowed students to make accelerated progress, and this was notably consistent across subjects and year groups," (OFSTED 2014) when results were declining and continued to decline.

Writing in 2014, Ofsted stated with respect to the Academies Enterprise Trust that:

The sponsor works closely with the Principal to ensure that support is proportionate to need and this is well judged.
