= Identity Crisis (Clea album) =

Studio album by Clea
- Released: January 26, 2004
- Recorded: 2003
- Genre: Pop
- Length: 45:00
- Label: 1967 Records

Clea chronology
Identity Crisis (2004)	Trinity (2006)

Singles from Trinity
- 1. "Download It" Released: September 22, 2003; 2. "Stuck in the Middle" Released: February 16, 2004

Identity Crisis is the debut album by pop group Clea. Identity Crisis was released in Russia, Eastern Europe and in certain countries in Asia. In these regions, the album had some minor success. The album spawned two singles, "Download It" and "Stuck in the Middle", achieving low chart positions.

== Track listing ==
No.	Title	Writer(s)	Length
1.	"Stuck in the Middle"	Jane Vaughan; Obi Mhondera; Sylvia Bennett-Smith; Christian Ballard; Andrew Murray	5:02
2.	"The Lie"	Bennett-Smith; Christian Ballard; Murray	4:21
3.	"Butterflies and Rainbows"	Bennett-Smith; Christian Ballard; Murray	3:46
4.	"First Love"	Sarah O'Connor; Graham Plato	3:52
5.	"Identity Crisis"	Christian Ballard; Murray; Bennett-Smith	4:28
6.	"One More Try"	Alex Shevchenko; Ballard; Bennett-Smith; Murray	3:36
7.	"Sprung"	Vaughan; Mhondera; Bennett-Smith; Ballard; Murray	4:11
8.	"Crush"	Vaughan; Julie Morrison; Plato	3:35
9.	"A Guy Like You"	Vaughan; Shevchenko; Bennett-Smith; Ballard; Murray; Clea	2:51
10.	"Download It"	Murray; Ballard; Tom Nichols	4:11
11.	"Mind Games"	Morten Schjolin; Clea	3:32
12.	"Pretty Little Bad Girl"	Vaughan; Mhondera; Bennett-Smith; Ballard; Murray	4:03
