= Is It Really Love? =

Single by Jermaine Stewart

from the album Say It Again
- B-side: "Search"
- Released: 1989
- Genre: Pop
- Length: 4:00
- Label: 10 Records
- Songwriter(s): André Cymone, Jody Watley
- Producer(s): André Cymone

Jermaine Stewart singles chronology
"Don't Talk Dirty to Me" (1988)	"Is It Really Love?" (1989)	"Tren de Amor" (1989)

"Is It Really Love?" is a song by American singer Jermaine Stewart, which was released in 1989 as the fourth and final single from his third studio album Say It Again (1988). The song was written by André Cymone and Jody Watley, and produced by Cymone. The single was released in Germany only and reached No. 41.

The B-side "Search" was exclusive to the single, written by Stewart and Roy Carter. It later appeared on the 2005 compilation Attention: A Tribute to Jermaine Stewart. For the single, extended and dub remixes of "Is It Really Love?" were created.

== Critical reception ==
On its release as a single, Music & Media described the song as "cool, funky, hi-tech disco with a staccato groove".

== Formats ==
7" Single

1. "Is It Really Love?" – 4:00
2. "Search" – 4:23

12" Single

1. "Is It Really Love? (Extended Remix)" – 6:53
2. "Is It Really Love? (Dub Mix)" – 5:26
3. "Search" – 4:23

CD Single

1. "Is It Really Love (7" Mix)" – 4:01
2. "Get Lucky (Album Version)" – 4:05
3. "Is It Really Love? (Extended Remix)" – 6:55
4. "Search" – 4:23

== Charts ==
Chart (1989)	Peak position
German Singles Chart	41

== Personnel ==
- Producer on "Is It Really Love?" – André Cymone
- Remixer of "Is It Really Love? (Extended Remix)" – Phil Harding & Ian Curnow
- Remixer of "Is It Really Love? (Dub Mix)" – Phil Harding & Ian Curnow
- Additional Production, Remix on "Is It Really Love?" – Phil Harding & Ian Curnow
- Producer of "Search" – Roy Carter
- Writers of "Is It Really Love" – André Cymone, Jody Watley
- Writers of "Search" – Jermaine Stewart, Roy Carter
