= David Florimbi =

American artist (born 1961)

- Born: May 9, 1961 (age 65)
- Education: Georgetown University
- Occupation: Artist

David Florimbi (born May 9, 1961) is an American-born artist living in Santa Barbara, California. Florimbi spent his formative years in Spain and Italy. He attended Georgetown University where he studied Fine Art, and was awarded the Milton Glaser Design Fellowship by the Milton Glaser Foundation. Upon graduation in 1983, Florimbi was awarded a scholarship by the University of Georgia to study painting in Cortona, Italy. Since 1984 his work has been exhibited nationally and internationally in Italy (,Palazzo di Cortona and the American Academy of Rome), New York (K&E, Radix, and the Ronald Feldman Gallery) and numerous shows throughout California. His work has also been included in museum shows, most recently at the Santa Barbara Museum of Contemporary Art, the University Art Museum at UCSB, and the Georgetown University Gallery in Washington D.C.

Florimbi and his work have been reviewed and featured in publications including Vanity Fair and Architectural Digest. Art critic Donald Kuspit commented on his work, stating: “Sex, power, and spirituality seem to be Florimbi's basic themes. He gives them modern form and fresh impact even as he filters them through traditional art....it seems a tour-de-force of painterly handling and emotional expression.”

In 2012, Priscilla Frank of The Huffington Post reviewed Florimbi's exhibition Coming and Going at Frank Pictures Gallery in Los Angeles, writing that his paintings draw together historical depictions of the sky from Renaissance fresco to time-lapse photography. She wrote:

Each painting emits a supernatural weather so strong it threatens to suck us in, uncertain as to whether we will sink, soar, float or fall.

Florimbi's work is held in the collections of Cedars-Sinai Medical Center, the UCLA Medical Center, and the Frederick R. Weisman Art Foundation.
