= Claremont Pier =

Pier in Lowestoft, England

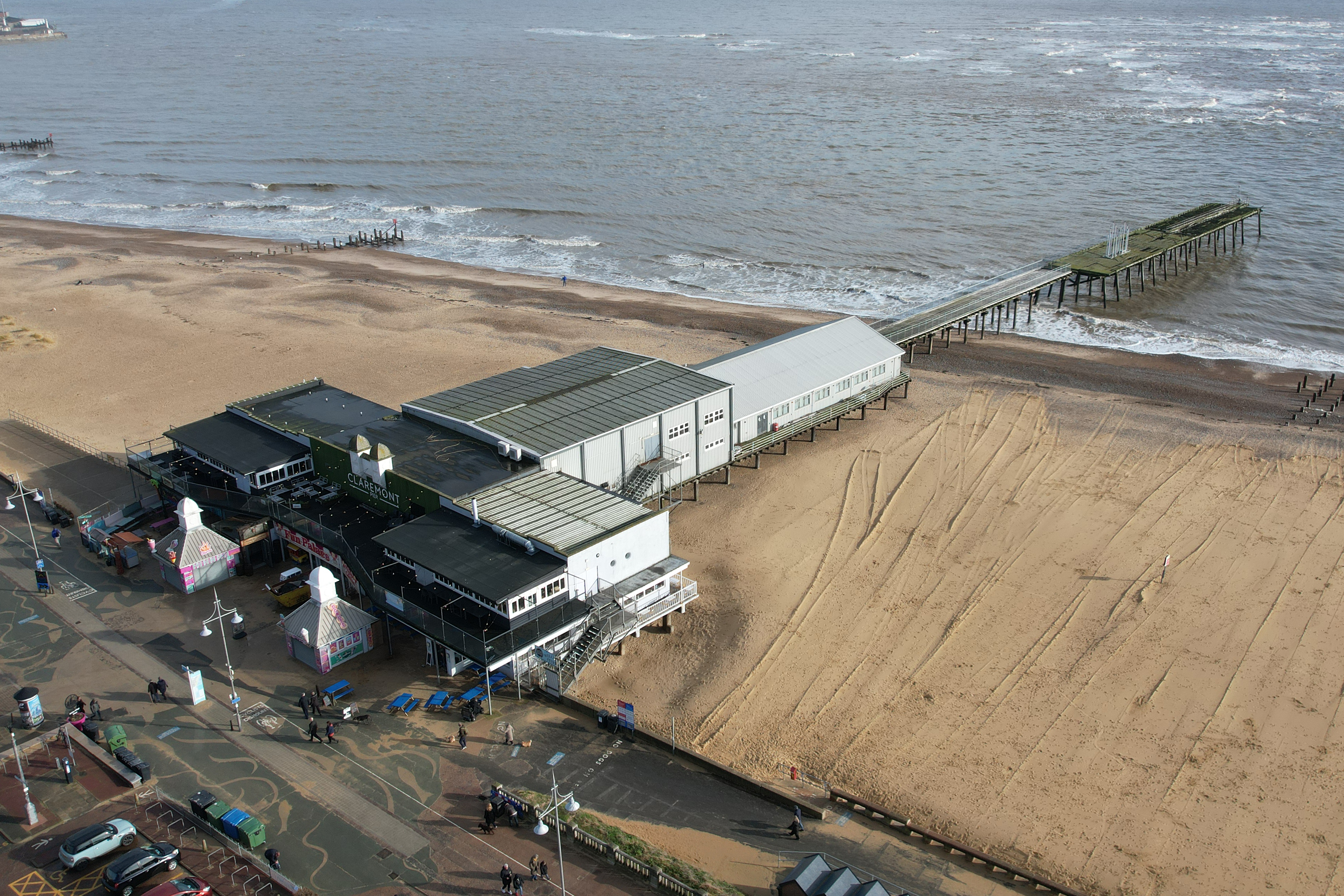
- View of Claremont Pier in 2026
- Type: Pleasure Pier
- Coordinates: 52.4657°N 1.7464°E
- Official name: Claremont Pier
- Owner: Charmaine and Edward Mayne and Family

Characteristics
- Total length: 600 feet (180 m)

History
- Designer: D. Fox
- Opening date: 1903; 123 years ago

The Claremont Pier is a traditional seaside pier in Lowestoft in the English county of Suffolk. Opened in 1903 and named after nearby Claremont Road, the pier was sectioned during the war through fear it could be used for an enemy invasion. It was subsequently restored using a Bailey Bridge and used as a training facility for the army.

== History ==
The pier was authorised by the Lowestoft (South) Pier Order 1900, and constructed by the Coast Development Company and opened in 1903, originally as a mooring for Belle steamers. Its name originates from its close proximity to Claremont Road. It was designed by D. Fox and was originally 600 feet (180 m) before being extended under the Lowestoft (South) Pier Order 1912 when a T-shaped landing head was added, bringing it to a length of 760 feet (230 m).

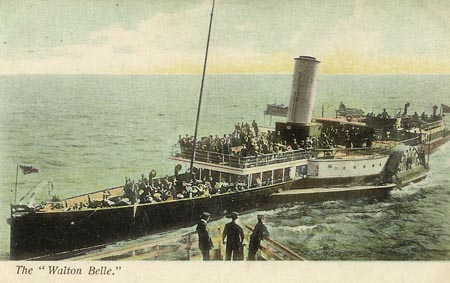
PS Walton Belle sailed from Great Yarmouth via Lowestoft and intermediate piers to Clacton

=== Mid 20th century ===
Steamer services ended at the pier in 1939, with the last use being to bring evacuees from London. As with many piers during the war, it was sectioned in 1940 as a defense measure against the threat of invasion. When that threat had passed, the gap was closed with a Bailey bridge and the pier became an Army training centre during World War II until 1948.

By 1948 the pier was abandoned and derelict, and when Lowestoft Town Council refused an offer to purchase it for £4,000 the actor George Studd took it over for a year and began to repair the pier. After repair in the 1950s, a storm in 1962 washed a section of it away, reducing its length to 720 feet (220 m).

=== Late 20th century ===
In the 1990s the pier was taken over by the Scott family and, despite restoration work on the shoreward end, much of the pier remains in need of restoration. Facilities at the shoreward end include a nightclub, amusement arcade, children's rides and a restaurant and take-away.

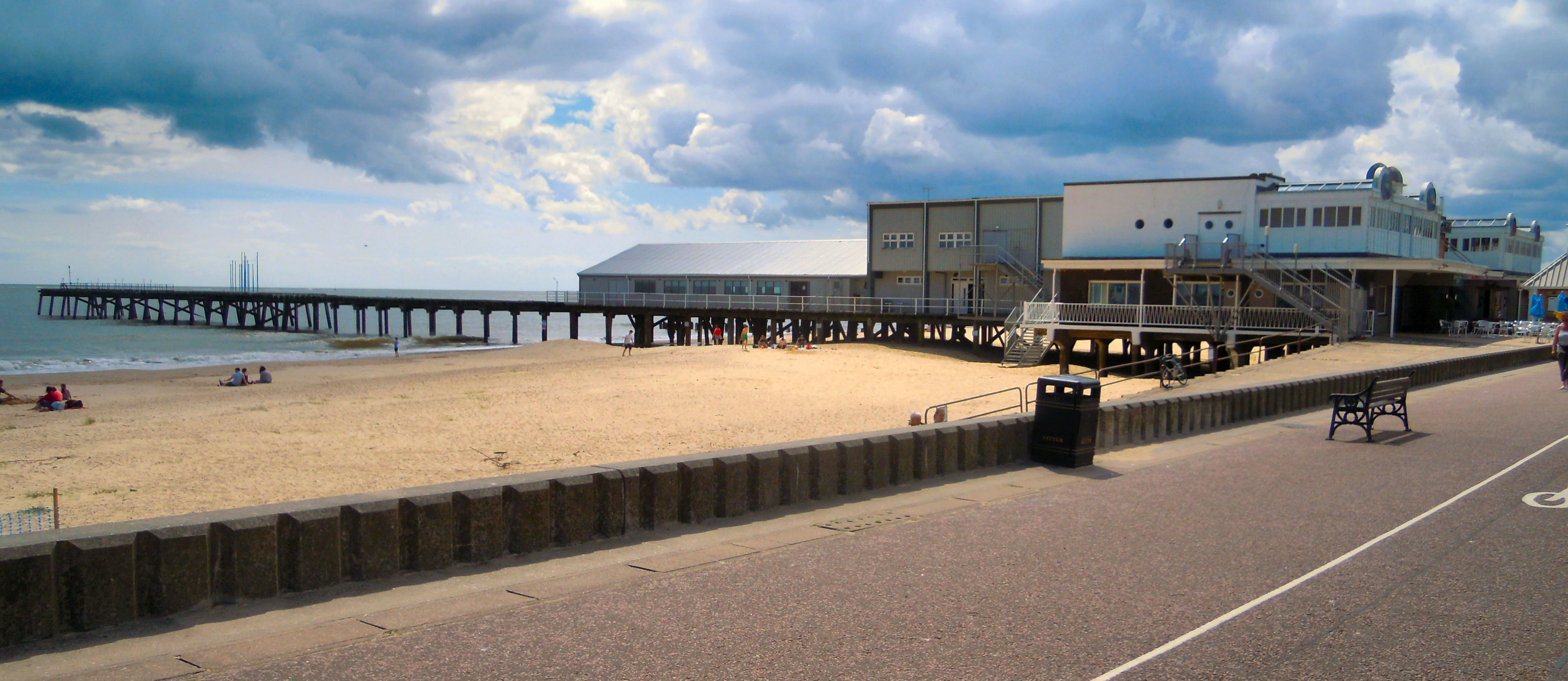
The Claremont Pier in 2016

=== 21st century ===
In 2005 the pier was put up for sale at £2.8 million but was unsold.

In April 2018, the pier was put on the market with an asking price of £2.5m. It remained unsold by January 2020, by then being available at a much reduced asking price of £1.25m. By this time, it had been owned for 50 years by David Scott and his family. The pier was sold during the summer of 2020 with the new owners reopening the pier in July 2020 along with the restaurant and ice cream kiosk. Future plans included a desire to reopen the pier deck and allow people to walk along, with costs estimated at between £1.5m - £3m and requiring a grant or lottery funding to make it viable.

== Facilities ==
The pier includes an ice cream kiosk, coffee shop, fish and chips takeaway and restaurant, amusements arcade, beach bar, sports bar, night club and a brand new roof top terrace.
