= Get Lucky (Jermaine Stewart song) =

Single by Jermaine Stewart

from the album Say It Again
- B-side: "Imagine"
- Released: March 1988 (UK); June 1988 (US)
- Genre: Pop, new jack swing
- Length: 3:45
- Label: 10 Records, Siren Records, Virgin Records, Arista Records
- Songwriters: Errol Brown, Simon Climie
- Producers: Aaron Zigman, Jerry Knight

Jermaine Stewart singles chronology
"Say It Again" (1987)	"Get Lucky" (1988)	"Don't Talk Dirty to Me" (1988)

"Get Lucky" is a song by American singer Jermaine Stewart, released in 1988 as the second single from his third studio album Say It Again. It was written by Errol Brown and Simon Climie, and produced by Aaron Zigman and Jerry Knight. For its release as a single, "Get Lucky" was given a remix by Phil Harding. The song was a commercial success, particularly in Europe, but failed to chart in the United States, although it did reach No. 12 on the Billboard Dance Club Songs chart. It reached No. 13 in the UK, and No. 6 in both Switzerland and Germany.

The single's B-side, "Imagine", which was exclusive to the single, written by Stewart and Roy Carter.

== Background ==
Speaking to Record Mirror in 1988, Stewart said of the song and its video, "I think 'Get Lucky' has a nostalgic, Fifties feel to it. We shot the video in a Fifties style and I think it's the kind of thing someone like Marlon Brando would like."

== Promotion ==
A music video was filmed to promote the single. It was directed by Dieter "Dee" Trattmann and produced by Anthony Taylor for Picture Music Int. On March 13, 1988, a UK film crew visited Stewart at his home in Hollywood, with footage being shot behind the scenes of the "Get Lucky" video. In the UK, Stewart also performed the song on popular music show Top of the Pops.

== Critical reception ==
On its release, Max Bell of Number One commented: "Barely has "Say It Again" bade a cheery goodbye than he's back in the ring with a slice of doleful disco that's camper than weekend at Butlin's. Jermaine starts off threatening to be Depeche Mode but sees the error of his ways and ends up settling for a Bee Gees flavoured mood which is palatable in small doses. Cash Box listed the single as one of their "feature picks" during July 1988. They commented: "A shuffling feel and a strong vocal highlight this fine track."

== Formats ==
7" single

1. "Get Lucky" - 3:45
2. "Imagine" - 4:01

12" single (UK release)

1. "Get Lucky (Extended Remix)" - 6:15
2. "Get Lucky (Dub)" - 4:50

12" single (US release)

1. "Get Lucky (Extended Dance)" - 6:15
2. "Get Lucky (Dub Version)" - 4:50
3. "Get Lucky (Single Version)" - 3:45
4. "Get Lucky (R&B Mix)" - 3:58
5. "Imagine" - 4:01

12" single (European release)

1. "Get Lucky (Extended Remix)" - 6:15
2. "Get Lucky (Dub)" - 4:50
3. "Imagine" - 4:01

Cassette single (US release)

1. "Get Lucky (Single Version)" - 3:45
2. "Imagine" - 4:01

CD single (UK release)

1. "Get Lucky" - 3:46
2. "Get Lucky (Extended Remix)" - 6:19
3. "Say It Again (The Jingle Mix)" - 3:54
4. "Places" - 4:01

== Charts ==
=== Weekly charts ===
Chart (1988)	Peak position
Belgium (Ultratop 50 Flanders)	10
Canada Dance/Urban (RPM)	17
Ireland (IRMA)	14
Netherlands (Dutch Top 40)	12
Netherlands (Single Top 100)	14
Switzerland (Schweizer Hitparade)	6
UK Singles (Official Charts)	13
US Dance Club Songs (Billboard); Remix	12
US Hot R&B/Hip-Hop Songs (Billboard)	69
West Germany (GfK)	6

=== Year-end charts ===
Chart (1988)	Position
Belgium (Ultratop)	53
West Germany (Media Control)	34

== Personnel ==
- Jermaine Stewart - vocals
- Jerry Knight - instruments
- Aaron Zigman - instruments
- Lenny Castro - percussion
- Jackie James - backing vocals

Production

- Aaron Zigman, Jerry Knight - producers of "Get Lucky"
- Csaba Petocz, - engineer on "Get Lucky"
- John Arrias - additional engineer on "Get Lucky"
- Mick Guzauski - mixing and recording on "Get Lucky"
- Gary Wagner - engineer and recording on "Get Lucky"
- Phil Harding - remixing and additional production on "Get Lucky"
- Roy Carter, Jermaine Stewart - producers of "Imagine"
- Peter Rackham - engineer on "Imagine"

Other

- Timon at Bill Smith Studio - sleeve design
- Marc Le Bon - photography
