= Everybody Loves Lil' Chris =

Television series

- Directed by: John Pereira
- Presented by: Lil' Chris
- Country of origin: United Kingdom
- Original language: English
- No. of series: 1
- No. of episodes: 7

Production
- Executive producers: Adam Penny; Peter Penny
- Producer: Gareth Collett
- Running time: 23 minutes

Original release
- Network: Channel 4
- Release: 4 October – 15 November 2008

Everybody Loves Lil' Chris was a television series broadcast by Channel 4 in 2008 and presented by the late singer and performer Lil' Chris.

Broadcast in October and November 2008 (after a successful pilot in April 2008), 18-year-old Lil' Chris (Chris Hardman) hosted seven episodes of Everybody Loves Lil' Chris on the T4 strand of Channel 4 on Saturday mornings. Each episode ran for 23 minutes. The series was a mixture of comedy, celebrity interviews, live music performances and various 'challenges' that Hardman undertook, including busking while dressed as a wild animal, visiting a haunted location and cage fighting. Another feature of the programmes was 'Lil' Chris' Big Eight', in which celebrity guests were quizzed on what they knew about the lives of such media personalities as Paris Hilton and Geri Halliwell.

The airing of the shows coincided with the release of Hardman's second album What's It All About in October 2008.

Guests on the series included Robyn, The Hoosiers, Shayne Ward, Keith Lemon, Katy Perry, The Feeling, Jack Osbourne, Basshunter, The Sugababes, The Script, George Sampson, The Saturdays, Jonas Brothers, Alphabeat, New Kids on the Block, Cage the Elephant, Pink, Kevin Bishop, Scouting for Girls, Will Young and Ne-Yo.

The executive producers were Adam Penny and Peter Penny. The series was directed by John Pereira, and was produced by Gareth Collett.
