= The Word Is Out =

Studio album by Jermaine Stewart
- Released: 1984
- Recorded: 1984
- Genre: R&B, soul, dance-pop
- Length: 37:27
- Label: Virgin/Arista
- Producer: Peter Collins

Jermaine Stewart chronology
The Word Is Out (1984)	Frantic Romantic (1986)

Professional ratings
Review scores
Source	Rating
AllMusic	3/5 stars

The Word Is Out is the first album by Jermaine Stewart, released in 1984. It includes "The Word Is Out", his first major single and first to enter the chart.

== Track listing ==
1. "The Word Is Out" (3:27) (Stewart, Greg Craig)
2. "I Like It" (3:15) (Stewart, Julian Lindsay)
3. "In Love Again" (3:42) (Stewart, Mikey Craig, G. Craig)
4. "Spies" (4:04) (Stewart, Lindsay)
5. "Reasons Why" (4:43) (Stewart, G. Craig, Lindsay)
6. "Get Over It" (3:34) (Stewart, Barry Sarna)
7. "You" (2:56) (Stewart, Lindsay)
8. "Month of Mondays" (3:27) (Stewart, Lindsay)
9. "Debbie" (3:17) (Stewart, Lindsay)
10. "Brilliance" (4:41) (Stewart, Lindsay)

== Charts ==
Chart (1984)	Peak position
US Billboard 200	90
US Billboard Top R&B/Hip-Hop Albums	30
