= Julian Stewart Lindsay =

- Julian Stewart Lindsay
- Education: Royal Academy of Music, London
- Occupation: Composer
- Known for: Collaborations with Culture Club, Jermaine Stewart, Stevie Wonder, The Beach Boys; Composer-in-residence at Hampton Court House School
- Notable work: Vox Dei (1999); Fox Wars (2013); arrangements for Jonathan Creek

Julian Stewart Lindsay is a British composer, currently working as composer-in-residence at Hampton Court House School. He was trained at the Royal Academy of Music in London. Lindsay has worked with artists such as Culture Club, Jermaine Stewart, Stevie Wonder, and The Beach Boys. Lindsay collaborated as a songwriter with Carl Wilson on "Maybe I Don't Know" from The Beach Boys.

Lindsay wrote the string and horn arrangement on the 1984 Ziggy Marley and the Melody Makers song "Lyin' in Bed", which mixed reggae with symphonic music. He also played keyboards for some of the Culture Club sessions; notably piano on "Victims" on Colour by Numbers. Lindsay also co-wrote on the majority of Jermaine Stewart's debut album The Word Is Out. Lindsay has written the music for television films and documentaries, including arranging the music for the television series Jonathan Creek.

In 1999, he was commissioned by Durham Cathedral's Chorister School to write a new work for the millennium to be performed in Durham Cathedral. The result was Vox Dei, a spiritual work inspired by the notion of godliness/spirituality being in everything and everyone. It was performed with a choir of some 200 singers. The organist was Daniel Hyde, and the soloist was Gena West.

Lindsay composed the music for Fox Wars which broadcast on 22 October 2013.
