= Set Me Free (Jermaine Stewart album) =

Studio album by Jermaine Stewart
- Released: 1992 (unreleased)
- Recorded: 1990–1992
- Genre: R&B, dance-pop
- Label: Reprise
- Producer: Jesse Saunders, Jason Hess, Jermaine Stewart

Jermaine Stewart chronology
What Becomes a Legend Most (1989)	Set Me Free (1992)	The Best of Jermaine Stewart (1998)

Singles from Set Me Free
- 1. "Set Me Free" Released: 1992

Professional ratings
Review scores
Source	Rating
AllMusic	3/5 stars

Set Me Free is the fifth and final album by singer Jermaine Stewart. The album was withdrawn from release by Reprise Records, but many fans have copies of it. Some copies still exist on cassette format as well the album has been remastered and shared within the fan community.

== Track listing ==
1. "Intro (The Riot)" - 0:46
2. "Set Me Free" - 4:17
3. "Conclusion" - 0:20
4. "Happiness" - 3:51
5. "Dippin'" - 0:16
6. "Special" - 4:53
7. "Never in a Million Years" - 3:52
8. "Shell-Shock" - 4:57
9. "Don't Sit Down" - 5:38
10. "Friends Like You" - 5:32
11. "Good Times" - 6:45
12. "I Just Want To" - 5:27
13. "Ask No Questions" - 5:01
14. "I'm in XTC" - 0:09
15. "XTC" - 3:56
16. "Set Me Free" (Reprise) - 4:20
17. "Money" - 4:52

Outtakes:

- "Basement Boy" (Unreleased) - 4:17
- "Lifestyle" - 5:07 (alternative take released on The Best of Jermaine Stewart and A Tribute to Jermaine Stewart, Attention.)
