= East Point Academy =

East Point Academy (correct as of Oct 2016)

Location
- Kirkley Run; Lowestoft, Suffolk, NR33 0UQ; England; 52°28′06″N 1°43′42″E

Information
- Type: Academy
- Established: 2011 (1938 as Notley Road School, 1970 as Kirkley Community High School)
- Local authority: Suffolk
- Department for Education URN: 137134 Tables
- Ofsted: Reports
- Principal: Peter Seadon
- Gender: Coeducational
- Age: 11 to 16
- Enrolment: 547 (as of Oct 2016)
- Houses: Crown, Mariners, Ravine, Wilde
- Colours: yellow, black
- Mascot: N/A
- Website: www.eastpointacademy.org

East Point Academy is an academy sponsored by the Inspiration Trust, located in the Kirkley district of Lowestoft, in the English county of Suffolk. It educates children from ages 11 to 16. In its latest Ofsted inspection in October 2016, the academy overall was rated as "Good". The school is also home to both the Lowestoft Railway and Lowestoft Ladies Hockey Clubs and the KITE Media Centre

== History ==
Notley Road School was originally opened on 31 August 1934 and was officially opened once the buildings were complete on 27 July 1938. Boys and girls over the age of 11 were admitted and were taught separately. Notley Road School was renamed the Alderman Woodrow School after John Woodrow the chairman of Lowestoft Education Committee, who implemented progressive educational reforms in Lowestoft. The name of the school changed again to Kirkley Community High School in 1970 until June 2010, being administered by Suffolk County Council since 1974 before converting to academy status as East Point Academy for the 2011/12 academic year as part of the Academies Enterprise Trust (AET). The students of this initial academic year received free uniforms for the re-opening

In December 2014, the Norfolk based Inspiration Trust (IT) formally took over the running of the academy and appointed Kevin Blakey as Principal. The main reasons (see 2014 takeover section below) behind this was the failure of the AET to move the academy out of special measures and that the IT were better placed geographically with its Norfolk base to continuously improve the academy, compared to the relative isolation under AET and its other academies.

On 16 October 1987, a great storm hit the area. "A classroom block at Kirkley High School was completely demolished in the destruction".

The school will be refurbished with funding from the government which was secured by the AET before it was taken over by Inspiration Trust

== Ofsted ==
According to the Ofsted inspection in March 2015 (3 months after the IT had acquired the academy) the school leadership was rated as "good" although other criteria "require improvement". Overall the academy has improved from being rated as "Inadequate" to "Requires Improvement". This was upgraded to "Good" in October 2016. As "Good" rated schools are typically inspected every 4 years, the next inspection is due late 2020, however Ofsted reserve the right to visit any educational establishment without any notice at any time for any reason/concern.

In October 2019, the academy received criticism from Ofsted for the "high number of pupils being taken off academy's roll" in Year 11. A suggested reason for this is to "remove low-performing or troublesome students. While it is not unlawful, Ofsted considers the practice unacceptable." The Ofsted report mentions "‘Leaders have good intentions, but they were not analysing their data about inclusion closely enough.’". This means that common reasons for the students leaving was not analysed and thus solutions to prevent pupils leaving the academy could not be formulated to prevent pupils from leaving the academy.

== 2014 Inspiration Trust takeover ==
After 3 years under the management of the AET, the academy was placed in "special measures" by Ofsted. In July 2014 it was announced that the academy faced a takeover from the Norfolk-based Inspiration Trust, due to the academy making insufficient progress towards moving out of special measures.

A spokesman for the Department for Education (DfE) said: "We have consistently demonstrated that where we find failure we will not hesitate to take action – regardless of the type of school. We are now working closely with AET and the school to ensure pupils’ education is not disrupted." A monitoring inspection in May 2014 pointed to a "steady improvement" in students’ attainment and progress, saying East Point was making "reasonable progress towards the removal of special measures".

Dame Rachel de Souza, the Chief Executive of Inspiration Trust was approached by the DfE about adding the academy to its growing portfolio. The DfE believed that her trust was in a better geographic and cohesive position compared to the AET, with the aim to bring the academy out of special measures quickly. (In July 2014, the next nearest AET sponsored academy to East Point Academy was in Felixstowe, approximately 40–50 miles away) "There’s a geographic logic to the change. We are [East Point Academy is] 10 miles from Great Yarmouth, where we have the primary academy. I think that’s what can make the difference."

In September 2014 the Principal (Neil Powell) and other senior members of staff threatened to quit the Academy if the proposed takeover did materialise. This was mainly due to the disruption it would cause to the ongoing progress towards moving the academy out of special measures.

In December 2014 the Vice Principal of Inspiration Trust sponsored Thetford Academy, Kevin Blakey, replaced Neil Powell as Principal of East Point Academy, when Inspiration Trust completed the takeover. Powell cited that he will be "staying with the AET" and was installed Principal of the AET sponsored Unity City Academy in Middlesbrough in January 2015. Following the Jan 2016 DfE letter complaining about 'unacceptably low standards' and failing to move the academy out of Special Measures, Powell resigned and left UCA in April 2016, returning to East Anglia in September 2016 as headteacher of North Walsham High School, which is administered by the local council and not the AET.

In October 2016, approximately 2 years after the Inspiration Trust acquired the academy, it was rated as "Good" by Ofsted. In addition, for the criteria "Effectiveness of leadership and management", was rated as "Outstanding".

== Sporting connections ==
Logo of Lowestoft Ladies Hockey Club

The academy has many connections with sport. Lowestoft Ladies Hockey Club and Lowestoft Railway Hockey Club both base themselves at the academy. In 2000, the academy (as KHS) became a Sports Specialist school culminating with association football success on 2 May 2008, the school lifted the U16 Royal Air Force Girls’ Cup. They overcame Bridgnorth Endowed School 3–2 at the City of Manchester Stadium.

The girls football success continued in May 2009, winning the U14 Suffolk County Cup, beating Stowmarket High School 2–1. Both Kirkley goals were scored by Hannah Walsh in the final played at Gainsborough Sports Centre in Ipswich.

== Gene Simmons' Rock School ==
In Autumn 2005, the second series of Channel 4's Gene Simmons' Rock School was filmed at the Academy (when it was Kirkley Community High School). Auditions were held, and after much deliberation, 11 (later 12) students were picked and were subsequently taught the basics of rock music by Kiss bassist Gene Simmons. The members were: Craig, Danielle Chapman, Jedda Smith, Jess Reid, Lauren Pashley, Lewis Divincenzo, Lil' Chris Hardman, Lily Vincent, Linde Rose, Rob Batchelor, Samanie Warren-Close & Sammi Reeve (later Katy & Toni Mickleburgh in The Upraw girl band). Simmons' eventually selected five (Hardman, Reeve, Reid, Rose & Warren-Close) of the students to perform as a rock group. The show culminated with the group opening for Judas Priest and Anthrax in front of 2,300 fans in LA. The lead singer of the band, Lil' Chris, was signed to RCA records.

== Notable alumni ==
Plaque commemorating the opening of the new music wing by The Darkness in 2004

as Kirkley Community High School

Students

- "King of Shaves" founder Will King attended in the late 1970s. His father, Tony King, was Head of Physical Education at the school starting in the early 1960s
- Justin Hawkins, Dan Hawkins and Ed Graham of British rock group The Darkness are former pupils of the school. They later returned to the school to open the new music wing in 2004.
- Rob Houchen, musical theatre actor
- Late singer and TV presenter Lil' Chris, who featured in series Rock School that was filmed at the school, went on to release two albums and four singles.
- Olympic bronze medalist, Commonwealth silver medalist middleweight boxer and Big Brother: Celebrity Hijack housemate Anthony Ogogo is a former pupil of the school. He has appeared on many other TV programmes as a guest and advertisements for Subway.

Teachers

- Former Member of Parliament for Waveney, David Porter was a drama teacher at the school
- Terry Deary, most notable for writing the Horrible Histories series, taught at the school between 1975 and 1977, before he became a well-known author.

== Headteachers ==
- April 2014-December 2014 - Neil Powell
- December 2014 - November 2016 - Kevin Blakey
- November 2016 - September 2022- Richard Dolding

September 2022 – present - Lucy Austin
