= What Becomes a Legend Most =

Studio album by Jermaine Stewart
- Released: 1989
- Recorded: 1988–1989
- Genres: R&B, dance-pop, freestyle
- Length: 54:38
- Label: Arista
- Producers: Phil Harding, Ian Curnow, Derek Bramble, Michael Sembello, Dick Rudolph, Larry Robinson, Richard Scher, Jermaine Stewart, Arnold Hennings, Oliver Leiber

Jermaine Stewart chronology
Say It Again (1988)	What Becomes a Legend Most (1989)	Set Me Free (1992)

Singles from What Becomes a Legend Most
- 1. "Tren de Amor" Released: 1989; 2. "Every Woman Wants To" Released: 1990

"What becomes a legend most?" is also a tagline for mink fur from the American Legend Cooperative as well as a song on the Lou Reed album New Sensations.

What Becomes a Legend Most is a 1989 album by Jermaine Stewart.

This album would be Stewart's last official album. He fully recorded the 1992 album Set Me Free however it was never released. In his final years, he began recording the new album "Believe In Me" until his death in 1997. The recordings for this album were released in 2005 on the compilation A Tribute to Jermaine Stewart, Attention, released under his own brother's label.

The album continued Stewart's commercial decline, failing to make any impact in Europe or America. Stewart's previous 1988 album Say It Again was a fair European hit.

Only two singles were released from the album, "Tren de Amor" and "Every Woman Wants To". Both singles failed to make any impact, only peaking at #97 and #95 in the UK, respectively.

== Track listing ==
1. "Tren de Amor" (Jermaine Stewart, Ian Curnow, Phil Harding) (3:50)
2. "Set Me Free" (Derek Bramble) (3:40)
3. "State of My Heart" (Michael Sembello) (4:41)
4. "I'd Rather Be with You" (Larry Robinson, Kenny Jones) (5:10)
5. "Every Woman Wants To" (Richard Scher, Dorothy Sea Gazeley) (4:49)
6. "Lies" (Jermaine Stewart, Arnold Hennings) (5:08)
7. "One Lover" (Michael Sembello, R. Bell) (5:06)
8. "Call Me Before You Come" (Jermaine Stewart, Arnold Hennings) (4:47)
9. "Gourmet Love" (Jermaine Stewart, Richard Scher, Dorothy Sea Gazeley) (5:05)
10. "Please Say You Will" (Jermaine Stewart, Ian Curnow, Phil Harding) (3:40)
11. "Betty Blue" (Derek Bramble, Oliver Leiber) (3:51)
12. "Holes in My Jeans" (Jermaine Stewart, Richard Scher) (4:51)

Outtakes:

1. "When Sex Becomes a Religion" included on the "Tren de Amor" B-side single
2. "Hot and Cold" released on the Weekend at Bernie's soundtrack

== Personnel ==
- Jermaine Stewart - lead and backing vocals
- Ian Curnow - keyboards, bass on tracks 1 and 10
- Derek Bramble - keyboards, backing vocals on tracks 2 and 11
- Monty Stewart - keyboards on track 2
- Eddie Miller - keyboards on track 4
- Kenny Harris - keyboards, backing vocals on track 4
- Cornelius Mims - keyboards on track 4
- Richard C. Scher - keyboards and drum programming on tracks 5, 9, and 12
- Marquis 'Hami' Dair - additional keyboards on tracks 5 and 12
- Michael Sembello - programming, backing vocals on tracks 3 and 7
- Frank Larosa - programming on track 7
- Bud Rizzo - programming on track 7
- Rick Bell - programming on track 7
- Arnold Hennings - instrumentation on tracks 6 and 8
- Jay - scratching on track 4
- Robert Ahwai - electric guitar on track 1
- Jennifer Batten - guitar solo on track 7
- Aaron McLain - guitar on track 9
- Dan Huff - guitar on track 11
- Mikal Reid - guitar on track 12
- Randy Hope-Taylor - bass guitar on track 1
- Orlando Sims - bass guitar on track 5
- Robert Bond - percussion on track 1
- Phil Harding - drums on tracks 1 and 10
- Ollie Leiber - drums and percussion on track 11
- Larry Robinson - drum programming on track 4
- Stanley Smith - drum programming on track 4
- Mark Feltham - harmonica on track 1
- Dave Koz - saxophone on track 2
- Richard Elliot - saxophone solo on track 3
- F.O.S. - rap on track 5
- Calvin Romance - rap on track 12
- Leroy Osbourne - backing vocals on track 1
- Tessa Miles - backing vocals on track 1
- Mae McKenna - backing vocals on tracks 1 and 10
- Howard Hewett - backing vocals on track 2
- Jean McClain - backing vocals on track 2
- Dominique - backing vocals on tracks 2 and 12
- Tyler Harris - backing vocals on track 4
- Kipper Jones - backing vocals on track 4
- Monalisa Young - backing vocals on tracks 5, 9, and 12
- Terry Young - backing vocals on tracks 5, 9, and 12
- Roy Galloway - backing vocals on tracks 5, 9 and 12
- Renee Geyer - backing vocals on tracks 5, 9 and 12
- Juliet Roberts - backing vocals on track 6
- Carroll Thompson - backing vocals on track 6
- Cruz Baca Sembello - backing vocals on track 7
- David Carter - backing vocals on track 8
- Miriam Stockley - backing vocals on track 10
