= Figure It Out (Lil' Chris song) =

Single by Lil' Chris

from the album Lil' Chris
- B-side: "Like You Know"
- Released: 26 February 2007
- Recorded: 2006
- Genre: Pop rock
- Length: 2:57
- Songwriter(s): Hardman, Hedges, Butler, Martin Brannigan

Lil' Chris singles chronology
"Gettin' Enough??" (2006)	"Figure It Out" (2007)	"We Don't Have to Take Our Clothes Off'" (2007)

"Figure It Out" is the third single from Lil' Chris' debut self-titled album. It was his first single that failed to reach the Top 40 in the UK. It peaked at number 57 in the UK and stayed on the chart for one week.

== Track listing ==
CD1

1. "Figure It Out" - 2:53
2. "Like You Know" - 3:50

CD2

1. "Figure It Out" - 2:53
2. "I've Been Had" [Live In London] - 3:40
3. "Is She Ready?" [Live In Manchester] - 2:44
4. "Rachel" [Live From Glasgow] - 2:36
