= Gettin' Enough?? =

Single by Lil' Chris

from the album Lil' Chris
- B-side: "Crossing The Line"
- Released: 4 December 2006 (download); 11 December 2006 (Europe)
- Genre: Pop rock
- Songwriter(s): Christopher James Hardman, Ray Hedges, Nigel Butler
- Producer(s): Ray Hedges, Nigel Butler

Lil' Chris singles chronology
| "Checkin' It Out" (2006) | "Gettin' Enough??" (2006) | "Figure It Out" (2007) |

"Gettin' Enough??" is the second single from British singer Lil' Chris' debut self-titled album. Although the song failed to repeat the success of its predecessor "Checkin' It Out", it peaked at number 17 on the UK Singles Chart.

== Track listing ==
CD1

1. "Gettin' Enough??" - 2:56
2. "Crossing the Line" - 2:41

CD2

1. "Gettin' Enough??" - 2:56
2. "Don't Ask (Cos It Kills Me)" - 3:06
3. "Gettin' Enough??" [J Dub Remix] - 3:34
4. Lil' Chris Interview - 5:04

== Music video ==
The music video takes the form of a spoof '80s educational video on puberty and sex. The video contains scenes showing various teenagers playing musical instruments, along with captions containing sexual innuendos (e.g. "A clean instrument is a happy instrument"). The video was directed by Brett Simon.
