= Don't Ever Leave Me (Jermaine Stewart song) =

Single by Jermaine Stewart

from the album Frantic Romantic
- B-side: "Give Your Love to Me"
- Released: December 1986 (US); January 1987 (UK)
- Genre: Pop
- Length: 4:12
- Label: 10 Records
- Songwriters: Jeffrey Cohen, Jermaine Stewart, Narada Michael Walden
- Producer: Narada Michael Walden

Jermaine Stewart singles chronology
"Jody" (1986)	"Don't Ever Leave Me" (1986)	"Say It Again" (1987)

"Don't Ever Leave Me" is a song by American singer Jermaine Stewart, which was released as the fourth and final single from his 1986 album Frantic Romantic. The song was written by Stewart, Jeffrey Cohen and Narada Michael Walden, and produced by Walden.

"Don't Ever Leave Me" was released as a single in America in 1986 by Arista, and the UK in 1987 by 10 Records. The single peaked at number 76 in the UK Singles Chart and remained in the top 100 for three weeks. The B-side for the single, "Give Your Love to Me", was taken from Frantic Romantic.

== Critical reception ==
On its release, David Quantick of New Musical Express described the song as a "mildly glum" ballad and added, "The guitar reminds me of 'Rainy Night in Georgia', the tune reminds one of any number of rainy nights anywhere." Lucy O'Brien of New Musical Express also reviewed the single and considered it to be "inoffensive slow-moving, soporific weasley-voiced daytime radio fodder". Andy Hurt of Sounds wrote, "This guy used to be a complete nerd, but this ballad is not bad at all, perfect cover fodder for Paul Young or Alison Moyet, or Elkie Brooks, come to that."

== Formats ==
7-inch single

1. "Don't Ever Leave Me" - 4:12
2. "Give Your Love to Me" - 4:20

12-inch single

1. "Don't Ever Leave Me" (Extended) - 5:00
2. "Don't Ever Leave Me" - 4:19
3. "Give Your Love to Me" - 4:20

== Personnel ==
- Narada Michael Walden - producer

== Charts ==
Chart (1987)	Peak position
UK Singles Chart	76
