= I Surrender (Clea song) =

2006 single by Clea

"Stuck in the Middle/I Surrender"

Single by Clea

from the album Trinity
- Released: August 16, 2006 (Europe)
- Genre: Pop
- Label: Upside Records
- Songwriters: Victoria Horn, Darren Tate

Clea singles chronology
"Lucky Like That" (2006)	"Stuck in the Middle/I Surrender" (2006)

"Stuck in the Middle/I Surrender" is the fifth single by English girl group Clea. The double A-side single was not released in the UK, and was only released in the rest of Europe. Both songs appear on their UK debut album, Trinity.

== 2006 Europe release ==
- CD single
1. "Stuck in the Middle"
2. "Stuck in the Middle" (Cutfather & Joe Mix feat. ODB)
3. "I Surrender"
4. "I Surrender" (Magic Mitch Radio)

== Kate Ryan version ==
"I Surrender"

Single by Kate Ryan

from the album Free
- Released: August 22, 2008
- Recorded: 2007/2008
- Genre: Dance-pop, house, Eurodance
- Length: 3:31 (Album Version); 03:00 (Single Mix)
- Label: ARS/Universal
- Songwriters: Victoria Horn, Darren Tate
- Producers: Niclas Kings, Niclas Bergwall (2N); Cédric Lorrain, Stephane Lozach, Olivier Visconti (Single Mix)

Kate Ryan singles chronology
"Ella, elle l'a" (2008)	"I Surrender" (2008)	"Your Eyes" (2009)

Audio video
- "I Surrender" on YouTube

In 2008, Kate Ryan covered "I Surrender" on her studio album Free. A new version of the song was created with British producer Darren Tate for the single release. Produced by Niclas Kings and Niklas Bergwall (2N), and the single version was produced by Cédric Lorrain "RLS", Stephane Lozach and Olivier Visconti (SECO Productions). It has proved most successful in the Netherlands, where it peaked at No. 12.

During her UK tour in 2008, this song was mixed with the Chemical Brothers' "Galvanize".

=== Track listing ===
CD single

1. "I Surrender" (PF Pumping Radio Edit) - 3:00
2. "I Surrender" (PF Pumping Extended Mix) - 6:40
3. "I Surrender" (Album Version) - 3:31
4. "I Surrender" (Jewelz Reset Remix) - 6:58

=== Official versions ===
- Album Version - 03:31
- Cansis Radio Edit - 3:57
- Cansis Remix - 5:25
- Jewelz Remix - 5:11
- Jewelz Reset Remix - 6:58
- PF Pumping Radio Edit - 03:00 (used as the Single Mix)
- PF Pumping Extended Mix - 06:40

=== Weekly charts ===
Chart (2008–09)	Peak position
Belgium (Ultratop 50 Flanders)	27
Belgium (Ultratip Bubbling Under Wallonia)	21
Netherlands (Dutch Top 40)	12
Netherlands (Single Top 100)	44

=== Year-end charts ===
Chart (2009)	Position
Netherlands (Dutch Top 40)	97
