= Don't Talk Dirty to Me =

Single by Jermaine Stewart

from the album Say It Again
- B-side: "Places"
- Released: 1988
- Genre: Pop
- Length: 4:05
- Label: 10 Records, Siren Records, Virgin Records
- Songwriter(s): Jermaine Stewart, André Cymone
- Producer(s): André Cymone

Jermaine Stewart singles chronology
"Get Lucky" (1988)	"Don't Talk Dirty to Me" (1988)	"Is It Really Love?" (1989)

"Don't Talk Dirty to Me" is a song by American singer Jermaine Stewart, released as the third single in 1988 by 10 Records, Siren and Virgin from his third studio album, Say It Again (1988). The song was written by Stewart and André Cymone, and produced by the latter.

Although not a hit in America, "Don't Talk Dirty to Me" saw some commercial success in Europe. It was Stewart's biggest hit in West Germany, peaking at number four, and also reaching number 14 in Switzerland. Despite the success of the previous two singles from Say It Again, "Don't Talk Dirty to Me" failed to make the UK Top 40, peaking at number 61, and lasting on the chart for three weeks.

Unlike the previous Say It Again singles, no promotional video was filmed for the single. However, Stewart did perform the song on the German show Peters Pop Show, Soul Train, as well as the American police drama Miami Vice.

The B-Side for the single "Places" was exclusive to the single, written by Stewart and Roy Carter. It later appeared on the 2005 compilation Attention: A Tribute to Jermaine Stewart. For the single, various remixes of "Don't Talk Dirty to Me" were released along with the CD single track "Get Lucky (New York Mix)" which is a remix of Stewart's previous single.

== Formats ==
- 7" single
1. "Don't Talk Dirty to Me" - 4:40
2. "Places" - 4:26
- 12" single (American/Canadian release)
1. "Don't Talk Dirty To Me (Extended Dance Version)" - 8:56
2. "Don't Talk Dirty To Me (Dub Version)" - 4:20
3. "Don't Talk Dirty To Me (Single Version)" - 4:06
4. "Don't Talk Dirty To Me (Extended Dance Edit)" - 6:13
5. "Places" - 4:26
- 12" single (European release)
1. "Don't Talk Dirty To Me (Extended Remix)" - 8:56
2. "Don't Talk Dirty To Me (Dub)" - 4:20
3. "Places" - 4:26
- CD single
1. "Don't Talk Dirty To Me (Radio Edit)" - 4:05
2. "Don't Talk Dirty To Me (Remix Edit)" - 6:13
3. "Get Lucky (New York Mix)" - 4:04
4. "Places" - 4:26

== Charts ==
Chart (1988)	Peak position
Switzerland (Schweizer Hitparade)	14
UK Singles (OCC)	61
West Germany (Official German Charts)	4

== Personnel ==
- Sleeve Design – Bill Smith Studio
- Photography – Christof Gstalder
- Additional Producers, Remixers on "Don't Talk Dirty to Me" – Phil Harding & Ian Curnow
- Producer on "Don't Talk Dirty to Me" – André Cymone
- Producer on "Places" – Roy Carter
- Engineer on "Places" – Peter Rackham
- Remixers on "Get Lucky (New York Mix)" – Phil Harding & Ian Curnow
- Producers on "Get Lucky (New York Mix)" – Aaron Zigman, Jerry Knight
- Writers of "Don't Talk Dirty to Me" – André Cymone, Jermaine Stewart
- Writers of "Places" – Jermaine Stewart, Roy Carter
- Writers of "Get Lucky" – Errol Brown, Simon Climie
