= Say It Again (Jermaine Stewart album) =

Studio album by Jermaine Stewart
- Released: 1988
- Recorded: 1986–1987
- Studio: Sunset Sound Factory, O'Henry Sound Studios, and Larrabee Sound (Los Angeles), Conway Recording Studios, and Cherokee Recording Studio (Hollywood, California)
- Genre: R&B; soul; dance-pop; new jack swing
- Length: 49:12; 52:47 (European version)
- Label: Arista; 10 Records; Siren Records
- Producer: Jerry Knight; Aaron Zigman; André Cymone

Jermaine Stewart chronology
Frantic Romantic (1986)	Say It Again (1988)	What Becomes a Legend Most (1989)

Singles from Say It Again
- 1. "Say It Again" Released: October 1987; 2. "Get Lucky" Released: June 1988; 3. "Don't Talk Dirty to Me" Released: September 1988; 4. "Is It Really Love?" Released: 1989

Professional ratings
Review scores
Source	Rating
Number One	2/5 stars
Record Mirror	3.5/5 stars

Say It Again is the third album by American R&B singer Jermaine Stewart. It was released in 1988 on Arista Records; his second full-length album for the label, and his final album to be released in North America. The title track of the album reached No. 27 on the US Billboard Hot 100.

== Background ==
Stewart told Record Mirror in 1988, "The album is definitely a progression. Vocally I've grown up and I was able to project a lot of the feeling and truth contained in the songs."

== Track listing ==
No.	Title	Writer(s)	Length
1.	"Don't Talk Dirty to Me"	André Cymone; Jermaine Stewart	4:42
2.	"Say It Again"	Bunny Sigler; Carol Davis	4:09
3.	"Get Lucky"	Errol Brown; Simon Climie	3:59
4.	"Got to Be Love"	Cymone; Stewart	4:48
5.	"Dress It Up"	Cymone; Stewart; Watley	4:46
6.	"Don't Have Sex with Your Ex"	Paul Gurvitz; Stewart	4:24
7.	"Is It Really Love?"	Cymone; Watley	4:37
8.	"Call It a Miracle"	Danny Sembello; Bruce Gaitsch; Amy LaTelevision	4:27
9.	"Eyes"	Lauren Smith	4:50
10.	"My House"	Bruce Woolley; Watley	4:53
11.	"She's a Teaser"	Gurvitz; Evan Pace	3:39

European bonus track
No.	Title	Writer(s)	Length
12.	"My Body"	Cymone; Stewart	3:35

Outtakes:

- "You Promise", B-side on the "Say It Again" single
- "Imagine", B-side on the "Get Lucky" single and later included on the compilation album Attention: A Tribute to Jermaine Stewart
- "Places", B-side on the "Don't Talk Dirty to Me" single and later included on Attention
- "Search", B-side on the "Is It Really Love" single and later included on Attention; also released as "Search for Love" on the B-side of the single "Hot & Cold"
- "Attention", included on the album Attention

== Personnel ==
Musicians

- Jermaine Stewart – lead and backing vocals
- André Cymone – all instruments
- Jerry Knight – all instruments, backing vocals
- Aaron Zigman – all instruments
- Greg Porter – guitar solo on track 5
- Marty Walsh – guitar solo on track 8
- Jerry Hey – horn section on tracks 2 & 11
- Bill Reichenbach – horn section on tracks 2 & 11
- Kim Hutchcroft – horn section on tracks 2 & 11
- Larry Williams – sax solo on track 11
- Michael Lacata – drum fills on track 8
- Paulinho da Costa – percussion on track 10
- Marva King – backing vocals
- Muffy Hendrix – backing vocals
- Angel Rogers – backing vocals
- Jody Watley – backing vocals
- Wanda Hutchinson-Vaughn – backing vocals
- Pam Hutchinson – backing vocals
- James Ingram – backing vocals
- Josie James – backing vocals
- Deneice Williams – backing vocals
- Jackie James – backing vocals on tracks 3 & 9

Production

- Bobby Brooks – engineer
- Coke Johnson – engineer
- Ta Avi Mote – engineer
- Victor Flores – engineer
- Keith Cohen – engineer
- Mick Guzauski – engineer
- Gary Wagner – engineer
- Csaba Petocz – engineer
- Jared Held – assistant engineer
- Jimmy Preziosi – assistant engineer
- Jeff Lorenzen – assistant engineer
- Elmer Flores – assistant engineer
- John Arrias – additional engineer
- Jamie Yvette Snyder-Newman – production coordinator (André Cymone)
- Clive Davis – executive producer

Note

- In the booklet, engineer "Jarod Held" is credited as "Jared Held", vocalist "Deniece Williams" as "Denise Williams" and vocalist "Wanda Vaughn" as "Wanda Hutchinson-Vaughn".

== Charts ==
Chart (1988)	Peak position
UK Albums Chart	32
US Billboard 200	98
US Billboard R&B/Hip-Hop Albums Chart	45
