= We Don't Have to Take Our Clothes Off =

1986 single by Jermaine Stewart

Single by Jermaine Stewart

from the album Frantic Romantic
- B-side: "Brilliance"
- Released: May 27, 1986
- Recorded: 1985
- Genre: Dance-pop; funk
- Length: 4:54 (album version); 4:05 (edited single version)
- Label: Arista; Virgin; 10
- Songwriters: Narada Michael Walden; Preston Glass
- Producer: Narada Michael Walden

Jermaine Stewart singles chronology
"I Like It" (1985)	"We Don't Have to Take Our Clothes Off" (1986)	"Frantic Romantic" / "Versatile" (1986)

Music video
- ”We Don't Have to Take Our Clothes Off” on YouTube

Alternate cover
- UK 12" cover of "We Don't Have To..."

"We Don't Have to Take Our Clothes Off" (released in the United Kingdom as "We Don't Have To...") is a song by American R&B singer Jermaine Stewart, released in 1986 as the lead single from his second studio album, Frantic Romantic (1986). The song was written by Narada Michael Walden and Preston Glass, produced by Walden with Premik Russell Tubbs on saxophone. "We Don't Have to Take Our Clothes Off" remains Stewart's biggest commercial success, peaking at number five on the Billboard Hot 100. It also peaked within the top ten of the charts in Canada, Ireland, the Netherlands, and the United Kingdom.

== Background ==
Stewart recorded "We Don't Have to Take Our Clothes Off" during 1985 and it was released around the world the following summer. The single seemed to reflect more modesty regarding sex due to the AIDS epidemic at the time. When interviewed by Donnie Simpson in 1988, Stewart spoke of the lyrical message within the song, "I think it made a lot of people's minds open up a little bit. We didn't only want to just talk about clothes, we wanted to extend that. We wanted to use the song as a theme to be able to say you don't have to do all the negative things that society forces on you. You don't have to drink and drive. You don't have to take drugs early. The girls don't have to get pregnant early. So the clothes bit of it was to get people's attention, which it did and I'm glad it was a positive message."

The song reignited Stewart's popularity, as his previous single, "I Like It", had failed to make much impact as a follow-up to Stewart's moderately successful debut single, "The Word Is Out" ("I Like It" did not chart in either the US or the United Kingdom).

== Promotion ==
A music video directed by David Fincher was created for the single, and Stewart guested on numerous TV shows to promote the single, including appearances on Soul Train and American Bandstand.

== Legacy ==
In 2011, the song was used in a Cadbury's TV commercial in the United Kingdom, called The Charity Shop. This exposed the song to a new generation who downloaded the track and returned it to the UK Singles Chart, peaking at number 29.

The song also appeared in Kevin Smith's film Zack and Miri Make a Porno, the episode "My Dirty Secret" of the television show Scrubs, and the first episode of the second series of the comedy show Peter Kay's Car Share.

The song has been covered a number of times, including by Clea, Lil' Chris, and Ella Eyre.

In 2007, the single "Clothes Off!!" by Gym Class Heroes featuring Patrick Stump was released, interpolating the hook from the song.

== Release ==
In the US, "We Don't Have to Take Our Clothes Off" was released with the B-side, "Give Your Love to Me", the closing track from Frantic Romantic, written by Jakko J. and Stewart. In the UK and Europe, the B-side "Brilliance" was taken from Stewart's 1984 debut album, The Word Is Out, and was written by Stewart and Julian Lindsay. A dance remix of "We Don't Have to Take Our Clothes Off" was made by Lewis A. Martineé.

== Formats ==
7" single (American release)

1. "We Don't Have to Take Our Clothes Off" – 3:57
2. "Give Your Love to Me" – 4:20

7" single (Canadian release)

1. "We Don't Have to Take Our Clothes Off" (7” version) – 4:05
2. "We Don't Have to Take Our Clothes Off" (dub mix) – 6:40

7" single (European release)

1. "We Don't Have to Take Our Clothes Off" – 4:05
2. "Brilliance" – 4:43

7" single (UK and Australian release)

1. "We Don't Have To..." – 4:05
2. "Brilliance" – 4:43

12" single (American and Canadian release)

1. "We Don't Have to Take Our Clothes Off" (dance remix) – 5:45
2. "We Don't Have to Take Our Clothes Off" (dub) – 6:40
3. "We Don't Have to Take Our Clothes Off" (7” version) – 4:05

12" single (European release)

1. "We Don't Have to Take Our Clothes Off" (extended) – 5:45
2. "We Don't Have to Take Our Clothes Off" (7” version) – 4:05
3. "Brilliance" – 4:43

12" single (UK release)

1. "We Don't Have To..." (extended version) – 5:45
2. "We Don't Have To..." – 4:05
3. "Brilliance" – 4:43

== Charts ==
=== Original release ===
Weekly chart performance for "We Don't Have to Take Our Clothes Off"
Chart (1986–1987)	Peak position
Australia (Kent Music Report)	37
Canada (The Record)	11
Canada Top Singles (RPM)	2
Netherlands (Dutch Top 40)	7
Dutch Singles Chart	13
French Singles Chart	91
Irish Singles Chart	4
New Zealand Singles Chart	27
UK Singles Chart	2
US Billboard Hot 100	5
US Billboard R&B/Hip-Hop Songs Chart	64
US Billboard Dance/Club Play Songs Chart	41
US Billboard Hot Dance Music/Maxi-Singles Sales Chart	35

=== 2011 reissue ===
Chart (2011)	Peak position
Irish Singles Chart	30
UK Singles Chart	29
UK R&B Singles Chart	7

=== Year-end charts ===
Year-end chart performance for "We Don't Have to Take Our Clothes Off"
Chart (1986)	Rank
Belgium (Ultratop 50 Flanders)	82
Canada Top Singles (RPM)	18
Netherlands (Dutch Top 40)	62
Netherlands (Single Top 100)	94
UK Singles (OCC)	14
US Billboard Hot 100	60
US Cash Box Top 100	81

== Certifications ==
Region	Certification	Certified units/sales
Canada (Music Canada)	Gold	50,000^{^}
United Kingdom (BPI)	Platinum	600,000^{‡}
^{^} Shipments figures based on certification alone.^{‡} Sales+streaming figures based on certification alone.

== Personnel ==
=== Album version ===
Taken from the Frantic Romantic liner notes.

- Jermaine Stewart – lead vocals
- Narada Michael Walden – Drums, programming (Linn drum machine)
- Greg "Gigi" Gonaway – Simmons drum fills
- Preston "Tiger Head" Glass, Walter "Baby Love" Afanasieff – Keyboards, synthesizer
- Corrado Rustici – guitar
- Randy "The King" Jackson – Moog Source bass synth
- Marc Russo, Premik Russell Tubbs – saxophones
- Jeanie Tracy, Jim Gilstrap, Karen "Kitty Beethoven" Brewington, Laundon Von Kendricks, Sylvester, The Lala Gang (Sudhahota, Anukampa Walden, Carl Lewis, Kim Carter) – backing vocals

=== Additional personnel on single release ===
- Art direction – Donn Davenport
- Design – Rebecca Tachna
- Stylist – Jane Hoffman
- Photography – Steve Prezant
- Guitar on "We Don't Have to Take Our Clothes Off" – Chris Amigo
- Keyboards on "We Don't Have to Take Our Clothes Off" – Fro Sossa
- Mix engineer – Mike Couzzi
- Mixer on "We Don't Have to Take Our Clothes Off" – Lewis A. Martineé
- Producer, arranger on "We Don't Have to Take Our Clothes Off" – Narada Michael Walden
- Remixer on "We Don't Have to Take Our Clothes Off" (short version) – Lewis A. Martineé
- Remixer on "We Don't Have to Take Our Clothes Off" (dub mix) – Lewis A. Martineé
- Remixer on "We Don't Have to Take Our Clothes Off" (dance remix) – Lewis A. Martineé
- Producer on "Brilliance" – Peter Collins
- Producer on "Give Your Love to Me" – Narada Michael Walden
- Writers of "We Don't Have to Take Our Clothes Off" – Narada Michael Walden, Preston Glass
- Writers of "Brilliance" – Jermaine Stewart, Julian Lindsay
- Writers of "Give Your Love to Me" – Jakko J., Jermaine Stewart

== Clea version ==
"We Don't Have to Take Our Clothes Off"

Single by Clea vs. Da Playaz

from the album Trinity
- Released: September 2005 (UK); 2006 (Europe)
- Genre: Dance-pop
- Label: Upside

Clea vs. Da Playaz singles chronology
"Stuck in the Middle" (2004)	"We Don't Have to Take Our Clothes Off" (2005)	"Lucky Like That" (2006)

The song was covered by English girl group Clea and was released as their third single in the UK in September 2005. It was their third top 40 hit, charting at number 35. The song appears on their UK debut album, Trinity.

=== Charts ===
Chart (2005)	Peak position
UK Singles (OCC)	35

== Lil' Chris version ==
"We Don't Have to Take Our Clothes Off"

Single by Lil' Chris

from the album What's It All About
- Released: October 2007 (UK)
- Genre: Pop
- Label: RCA
- Songwriters: Narada Michael Walden; Preston Glass

Lil' Chris singles chronology
"Figure It Out" (2007)	"We Don't Have to Take Our Clothes Off" (2007)

Lil' Chris covered the song and released it as the only single from his second album, What's It All About, on October 19, 2007. It peaked at number 63 on the UK Singles Chart. This was his last single before his death in 2015.

=== Track listing ===
CD single

1. "We Don't Have to Take Our Clothes Off" – 3:04
2. "Taste Me" (live in Manchester)
3. "I Never Noticed" (Live in London)

7" vinyl

1. "We Don't Have to Take Our Clothes Off" – 3:04
2. "We Don't Have to Take Our Clothes Off" (Media Virus Remix) – 5:53

=== Charts ===
Chart (2007)	Peak position
UK Singles Chart	63

== Ella Eyre version ==
"We Don't Have to Take Our Clothes Off"

Song by Ella Eyre

from the album Feline (Deluxe)
- Released: October 5, 2013
- Label: Virgin EMI
- Producers: Michael Harwood, Sean Hargreaves

The song was covered by Ella Eyre and appeared first on Virgin Records: 40 Years of Disruptions, a record released on October 5, 2013, by Virgin Records celebrating 40 years in business. It was later included on her EP Ella Eyre, released February 10, 2015, and finally on the deluxe version of her debut album Feline. The song charted on the UK chart at number 54 and was certified Platinum by the British Phonographic Industry (BPI) in 2022.

=== Charts ===
Chart (2015)	Peak position
Sweden (Sverigetopplistan)	67
UK Singles (Official Charts)	54

=== Certifications ===
Certifications for "We Don't Have to Take Our Clothes Off"
Region	Certification	Certified units/sales
Denmark (IFPI Danmark)	Platinum	90,000^{‡}
New Zealand (RMNZ)	Platinum	30,000^{‡}
Sweden (GLF)	Gold	20,000^{‡}
United Kingdom (BPI)	Platinum	600,000^{‡}
^{‡} Sales+streaming figures based on certification alone.

== Other performances ==
- Calum Scott, a Britain's Got Talent contestant, performed the song in the 2017 semi-finals of the show.
