= Checkin' It Out =

Single by Lil' Chris

from the album Lil' Chris
- B-side: "Me And My Life"
- Released: 25 September 2006
- Recorded: 2006
- Genre: Pop rock, power pop, pop punk
- Length: 3:09
- Label: Sony
- Songwriter(s): Christopher James Hardman, Nigel Butler, Gary Osborne, Ray Hedges

Lil' Chris singles chronology
"Checkin' It Out" (2006)	"Gettin' Enough??" (2006)

"Checkin' It Out" was the first single from British singer Lil' Chris' debut self-titled album. The single peaked at number three on the UK Singles Chart. It topped the UK Official Download Chart. The song featured in a television commercial for ASDA's George clothing range.

== Track listing ==
1. "Checkin' It Out" - 3:03
2. "Me & My Life" [Acoustic Version] - 2:26
