= Jermaine Stewart =

American R&B singer (1957–1997)

- Stewart in a 1980s promotional photo

Background information
- Born: William Jermaine Stewart; September 7, 1957; Columbus, Ohio, U.S.
- Origin: Chicago, Illinois, U.S.
- Died: March 17, 1997 (aged 39) Homewood, Illinois, U.S.
- Genres: R&B, pop, soul, funk, dance
- Occupations: Singer-songwriter, dancer
- Years active: 1977–1997
- Labels: Arista Records, Reprise Records

William Jermaine Stewart (September 7, 1957 – March 17, 1997) was an American R&B singer best known for his 1986 hit single "We Don't Have to Take Our Clothes Off", which peaked at number five on the Billboard Hot 100. It also peaked within the top ten of the charts in Canada (at number two), Ireland, the Netherlands, and the United Kingdom. His 1987 song "Say It Again" reached number seven in the United Kingdom.

== Early life and career ==
William Jermaine Stewart was born in Columbus, Ohio, to Ethel and Eugene Stewart. In 1972, his family moved to Chicago, Illinois, where Stewart took his first steps toward a career in entertainment. Eventually, he gained recognition as a dancer on the locally produced television show Soul Train. While working there he befriended two other Soul Train dancers, fellow Chicagoan Jody Watley and Jeffrey Daniel.

After Soul Train relocated to Los Angeles, the three friends auditioned to become members of the group Shalamar, which was put together by Soul Train creator Don Cornelius and booking agent Dick Griffey. Watley and Daniel were selected for the group as backup/semi-lead vocalists, and Stewart lost out to Gary Mumford during his audition for lead vocalist. However, Stewart toured with the new group as a dancer for several years.

While in London for a show, he met Mikey Craig of Culture Club. Realizing that Stewart was a talented singer, Craig helped him in putting together a demo tape, and Stewart was given the opportunity to sing background vocals on Culture Club's song "Miss Me Blind". As a result of the combination of a strong demo and his ties with Culture Club, he landed a recording contract with Arista Records.

Stewart saw some success with the single "The Word Is Out" from the album of the same name. The album peaked at number 90 on the US Billboard 200 albums chart, and number 30 on the US R&B Albums chart. Stewart's next album was 1986's Frantic Romantic, which included the Billboard Hot 100 top ten song "We Don't Have to Take Our Clothes Off". The song was a global hit, peaking within the top ten of the charts in Canada, the Republic of Ireland, and the United Kingdom. A second single, "Jody", was released, the inspiration being his friend Jody Watley, which reached the US R&B top twenty. Frantic Romantic was Stewart's most successful selling album, peaking at number 34 in the US.

In 1987, he appeared in the video "Never Say Never" by Deniece Williams.

Stewart's third album was entitled Say It Again, with production handled largely by André Cymone. Supported by international live dates with his band The Party, the title track "Say It Again" became Stewart's second US Top 40 Billboard hit, and also reached the US R&B Top 10. In the UK Singles Chart it reached number 7, which helped the album achieve its Top 40 status.

The next three singles were all remixed by Phil Harding. "Get Lucky" (UK No. 13), "Don't Talk Dirty to Me" (UK No. 61), and "Is It Really Love?" found success in Europe, particularly in Germany, where "Don't Talk Dirty to Me" was one of the top five selling singles of 1988.

"They all charted and did really well," recalled Harding of the remixed tracks. "There was barely a brief [from the record company], beyond, 'Do your thing guys.' And then it was us taking the assumption, that since the PWL sound is all over the radio, let's make it more PWL."

Stewart's fourth and final album under contract with Arista Records was What Becomes a Legend Most. The album sold poorly in America while the lead single "Tren de Amor" just reached the top 100 in the UK. "Tren de Amor" was featured on the soundtrack to the movie She Devil. In 1989, Stewart sang "Hot and Cold", co-written by Andy Summers, which was featured over the opening credits of the film Weekend at Bernie's. "Hot and Cold" was released as a single on 7" as well as cassette, the single includes "Search for Love" which is the first appearance of this song written by Stewart and Roy Carter, it was later released as "Search" on the "Is It Really Love?" single.

In 1991, Stewart teamed up with Chicago producer Jesse Saunders for his last recorded work, an album for Reprise Records, Set Me Free. The title track "Set Me Free" was released as a single in the US, but sold poorly. The album remained unreleased as of 2021.

Shortly before his death, Stewart returned to the studio to record a new album titled Believe in Me. Although the album was not completed, the finished tracks were released on the 2005 compilation Attention: A Tribute to Jermaine Stewart, which was released under BFG Records (which is owned by Stewart's brother).

The 2007 song "Clothes Off!!" by Gym Class Heroes interpolated Stewart's signature song "We Don't Have to Take Our Clothes Off". On October 18, 2010, Cherry Red Records re-issued his album Frantic Romantic on CD for the first time since 1986. It includes bonus tracks, most notable of which are the 12" mixes of "Jody" and "Dance Floor", making their CD debut.

In 2011, the song "We Don't Have to Take Our Clothes Off" was used in a Cadbury advertisement in the UK called 'The Charity Shop'. This exposed the song to a new generation who downloaded the track, and returned it to the UK Singles Chart peaking at No. 29.

== Death ==
Stewart died of AIDS-related liver cancer on March 17, 1997, at the age of 39, in the Chicago suburb of Homewood, Illinois. His gravesite was left without a grave marker for more than 17 years. However, in 2014, his grave finally received a stone.

== Discography ==
=== Albums ===
Year	Title	Peak chart positions		
Year	Title	US	US R&B	UK
1984	The Word Is Out	90	30	—
1986	Frantic Romantic	34	31	49
1988	Say It Again	98	45	32
1989	What Becomes a Legend Most	—	—	—
1992	Set Me Free (unreleased)	—	—	—
2005	Attention: A Tribute to Jermaine Stewart	—	—	—
"—" denotes releases that did not chart or were not released in that territory.

=== Singles ===
Year	Title	Peak chart positions												Certifications	Album
Year	Title	US Hot 100	US Dance	US R&B	AUS	BEL	CAN	GER	NLD	NOR	NZ	SWI	UK	Certifications	Album
1984	"The Word Is Out"	41	4	17	—	—	—	—	—	—	—	—	—		The Word Is Out
1984	"Get Over It"	—	—	—	—	—	—	—	—	—	—	—	—		The Word Is Out
1985	"I Like It"	—	—	—	—	—	—	—	—	—	—	—	—		The Word Is Out
1986	"We Don't Have to Take Our Clothes Off"	5	41	64	37	10	2	—	13	—	27	—	2	BPI: Platinum	Frantic Romantic
1986	"Jody"	42	9	18	—	—	81	—	—	—	—	—	50		Frantic Romantic
1986	"Don't Ever Leave Me"	—	—	—	—	—	—	—	—	—	—	—	76		Frantic Romantic
1987	"Say It Again"	27	—	15	—	31	—	—	27	10	—	—	7		Say It Again
1988	"Get Lucky"	—	12	69	—	10	—	6	14	—	—	6	13		Say It Again
1988	"Don't Talk Dirty to Me"	—	13	—	—	—	—	4	—	—	—	14	61		Say It Again
1989	"Is It Really Love?"	—	—	—	—	—	—	41	—	—	—	—	—		Say It Again
1989	"Hot and Cold"	—	—	—	—	—	—	—	—	—	—	—	—		Weekend at Bernie's (soundtrack)
1989	"Tren de Amor"	—	—	—	—	—	—	—	—	—	—	—	97		What Becomes a Legend Most
1990	"Every Woman Wants To"	—	—	—	—	—	—	—	—	—	—	—	95		What Becomes a Legend Most
1992	"Set Me Free"	—	45	—	—	—	—	—	—	—	—	—	—		Single only
"—" denotes releases that did not chart
