= France Gall discography =

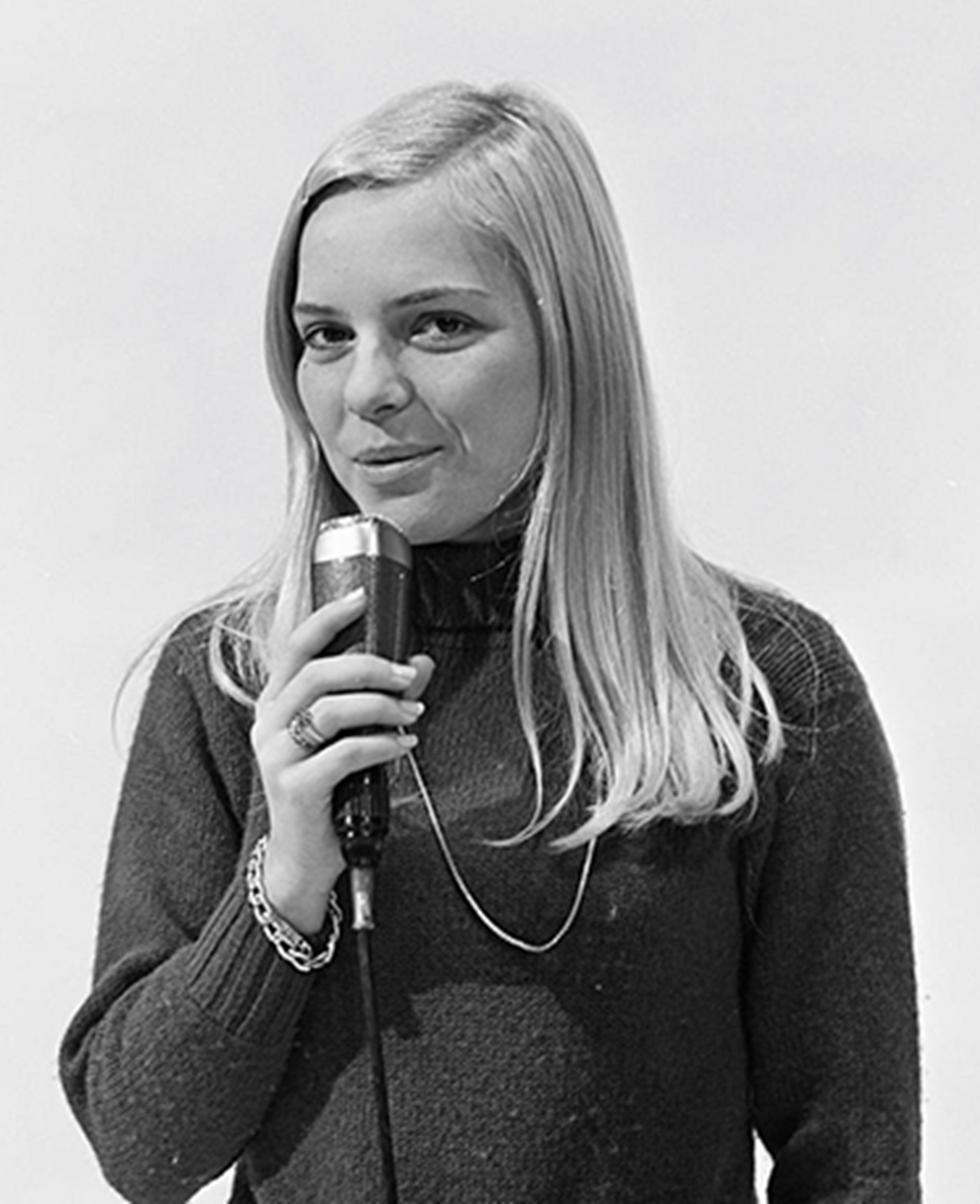
- Gall in 1968
- Studio albums: 15
- EPs: 18
- Live albums: 9
- Compilation albums: 24
- Singles: 69

France Gall was a French yé-yé and pop singer who released fifteen studio albums, nine live albums, twenty-four compilation albums, eighteen EPs and sixty-nine singles. She sold over 20 million records throughout her career, and achieved fourteen top-ten hits (of which four number-one hits) and three top-ten albums in France. In addition, songs by Gall have been successful in various other countries, including Belgium, Canada, Germany, Italy, Japan, the Netherlands and Switzerland.

Gall broke through in 1963 with her debut "Ne sois pas si bête", a French adaptation of the song "Stand a Little Closer" by the Laurie Sisters. In 1965, she won the tenth edition of the Eurovision Song Contest with "Poupée de cire, poupée de son", representing Luxembourg. The song, written by Serge Gainsbourg, became a hit across Western Europe. She subsequently began releasing songs in German, including "Der Computer Nr. 3" in 1968 and "Ein bißchen Goethe, ein bißchen Bonaparte" in 1969. She also participated in the Sanremo Music Festival 1969 alongside Gigliola Cinquetti with the song "La pioggia", finishing in sixth place.

From 1973, Gall again focused on her career in French-language music. In 1978, she featured on the rock opera album Starmania, produced by her husband Michel Berger. She later had success with the studio albums Tout pour la musique (1981), Débranche ! (1984) and, her best-selling album, Babacar (1987) – the latter containing the hit singles "Ella, elle l'a" and "Évidemment". Gall concluded her musical career shortly after the release of her final studio album, France, in 1996. In 2024, nearly seven years after her death, the compilation album Plus haut appeared, featuring the previously unreleased 1974 recording "La Prisonnière".

== Albums ==
=== Studio albums ===
Title	Album details	Peak chart positions					Certifications
Title	Album details	FRA	BEL (WA)	GER	SWE	SWI	Certifications
N'écoute pas les idoles	Released: March 1964; Label: Philips; Formats: Mini-LP	—	—	—	—	—	
Mes premières vraies vacances	Released: August 1964; Label: Philips; Formats: LP	—	—	—	—	—	
Sacré Charlemagne	Released: December 1964; Label: Philips; Formats: Mini-LP	—	—	—	—	—	
Poupée de cire, poupée de son	Released: April 1965; Label: Philips; Formats: LP	—	—	—	—	—	
Baby pop	Released: October 1966; Label: Philips; Formats: LP	—	—	—	—	—	
FG	Released: November 1966; Label: Philips; Formats: LP	—	—	—	—	—	
1968	Released: January 1968; Label: Philips; Formats: LP	—	—	—	—	—	
France Gall	Released: 16 December 1975 (cassette); 6 January 1976 (LP); Label: Atlantic; Formats: LP, cassette	—	—	—	—	—	FRA: Gold
Dancing Disco	Released: 27 April 1977; Label: Atlantic; Formats: LP, cassette	—	—	—	—	—	FRA: Platinum
Paris, France	Released: 19 May 1980; Label: Atlantic; Formats: LP, cassette	—	—	—	—	—	FRA: Platinum
Tout pour la musique	Released: 10 December 1981; Label: Atlantic; Formats: LP, cassette	2	—	—	—	—	FRA: Platinum
Débranche !	Released: 2 April 1984; Label: Apache; Formats: CD, LP, cassette	1	—	—	—	—	FRA: 2× Platinum
Babacar	Released: 19 February 1987; Label: Apache; Formats: CD, LP, cassette	2	—	7	24	25	FRA: Diamond
Double jeu (with Michel Berger)	Released: 12 June 1992; Label: Apache; Formats: CD, cassette	1	—	—	—	—	FRA: 2× Platinum; SWI: Gold
France	Released: 29 March 1996; Label: Warner; Formats: CD, cassette	15	11	—	—	—	FRA: 2× Gold

=== Live albums ===
Title	Album details	Certifications and notes
Live au Théâtre des Champs-Élysées	Released: 9 November 1978; Label: Atlantic; Formats: LP, cassette	
Palais des Sports	Released: 4 November 1982; Label: Apache; Formats: LP, cassette	FRA: Gold
Au Zénith	Released: 4 February 1985; Label: Apache; Formats: CD, LP, cassette	FRA: Gold
Le Tour de France 88	Released: 7 November 1988; Label: Apache; Formats: CD, LP, cassette	FRA: Platinum
Simple je – Débranchée à Bercy	Released: 29 October 1993; Label: Apache; Formats: CD, cassette	FRA: 2× Gold
Simple je – Rebranchée à Bercy	Released: 28 January 1994; Label: Apache; Formats: CD, cassette	FRA: 2× Gold
Simple je – L'Intégrale Bercy	Released: 18 November 1994; Label: Apache; Formats: CD, cassette	FRA: 2× Gold
Concert public / Concert privé	Released: 24 April 1997; Label: Apache; Formats: CD, cassette	Concert public recorded at the Olympia Hall in 1996, and Concert privé recorded as an M6 Concert privé special in 1997.
Pleyel	Released: 16 December 2005; Label: Warner; Formats: CD	Concert recorded at the Salle Pleyel in 1994.

=== Compilation albums ===
==== France ====
Title	Album details	Peak chart positions			
Title	Album details	FRA	BEL (FL)	BEL (WA)	SWI
Le Disque d'or de France Gall	Released: December 1968; Label: Philips; Formats: LP	—	—	—	—
Ses grands succès	Released: September 1973; Label: Musidisc; Formats: LP	—	—	—	—
Les Grands succès de France Gall	Released: April 1975; Label: Philips; Formats: LP, cassette	—	—	—	—
Cinq minutes d'amour	Released: January 1976; Label: Music for Pleasure; Formats: LP	—	—	—	—
Les Plus belles chansons de France Gall	Released: January 1982; Label: Atlantic; Formats: LP	—	—	—	—
Passionnément	Released: January 1988; Label: Apache; Formats: CD, LP, cassette	—	—	—	—
France Gall	Released: September 1989; Label: PolyGram; Formats: CD, LP, cassette	—	—	—	—
Les Années musique	Released: 16 February 1990; Label: Warner; Formats: CD, LP, cassette	—	—	164	—
Poupée de son	Released: 17 July 1992; Label: Polydor; Formats: CD	—	—	—	—
Best of France Gall	Released: 22 March 2004; Label: Polydor; Formats: CD	—	—	—	—
Évidemment	Released: 8 October 2004; Label: Warner; Formats: CD	41	14	1	15
Gold	Released: 21 April 2006; Label: Polydor; Formats: CD	—	—	—	—
Best of Live	Released: 26 October 2012; Label: Warner; Formats: CD	—	—	87	—
France Gall	Released: 12 May 2017; Label: Polydor; Formats: CD, LP	—	—	—	—
Plus haut	Released: 8 November 2024; Label: Warner; Formats: CD, LP	16	—	57	58

==== Canada ====
Title	Album details
France Gall	Released: April 1969; Label: La Compagnie; Formats: LP
Pleins feux sur... France Gall	Released: March 1971; Label: Philips; Formats: LP
Mes premières chansons	Released: September 2018; Label: Propagande; Formats: CD, LP

==== Germany ====
Title	Album details
Vive la France Gall	Released: March 1968; Label: Teldec; Formats: LP
Die grossen Erfolge	Released: November 1969; Label: Decca; Formats: LP
Die grossen Erfolge 2	Released: November 1970; Label: Decca; Formats: LP
Portrait in Musik	Released: May 1972; Label: Decca; Formats: LP
Ihre grössten Hits	Released: January 1988; Label: Teldec; Formats: CD, LP
En allemand – das Beste in Deutsch	Released: 30 March 1998; Label: East West; Formats: CD

== Extended plays ==
Title	Year	Peak chart positions			Album
Title	Year	FRA	BEL (WA)	CAN (QC)	Album
Ne sois pas si bête: "Ne sois pas si bête"; "Ça va je t'aime"; "J'entends cette musique"; "Pense à moi"	1963	34	24	5	N'écoute pas les idoles and Mes premières vraies vacances
N'écoute pas les idoles: "N'écoute pas les idoles"; "Les Rubans et la fleur"; "Ne dis pas aux copains"; "Si j'étais garçon"	1964	10	14	—	N'écoute pas les idoles and Mes premières vraies vacances
Jazz à gogo: "La Cloche"; "Jazz à gogo"; "Mes premières vraies vacances"; "Soyons sages"	1964	—	28	11	Mes premières vraies vacances
Laisse tomber les filles: "Laisse tomber les filles"; "Le Premier chagrin d'amour"; "Christiansen"; "On t'avait prévenue"	1964	4	9	—	Sacré Charlemagne and Poupée de cire, poupée de son
Sacré Charlemagne: "Sacré Charlemagne"; "Au clair de la lune"; "Nounours"; "Bonne nuit"	1964	1	4	12	Sacré Charlemagne and Poupée de cire, poupée de son
Poupée de cire, poupée de son: "Poupée de cire, poupée de son"; "Un prince charmant"; "Dis à ton capitaine"; "Le Cœur qui jazze"	1965	1	3	8	Poupée de cire, poupée de son
Attends ou va-t'en: "Attends ou va-t'en"; "Mon bateau de nuit"; "Et des baisers"; "Deux oiseaux"	1965	10	24	—	Baby pop
L'Amérique: "L'Amérique"; "On se ressemble toi et moi"; "Nous ne sommes pas des anges"; "Le Temps de la rentrée"	1965	15	32	49	Baby pop
Baby pop: "Baby pop"; "Faut-il que je t'aime"; "Cet air-là"; "C'est pas facile d'être une fille"	1966	8	23	24	Baby pop
Les Sucettes: "Les Sucettes"; "Je me marie en blanc"; "Quand on est ensemble"; "Ça me fait rire"	1966	—	14	—	FG (Note: Only the first tracks of each side (A1 and B1), as well as the song "La Rose de vents", were included on the album FG.)
Bonsoir John-John: "Bonsoir John-John"; "La Rose de vents"; "La Guerre des chansons"; "Boom Boom"	1966	—	15	25	FG
La Petite: "La Petite" (with Maurice Biraud); "Polichinelle"; "Nefertiti"; "Les Yeux bleus"	1967	—	48	—	1968 (Note: On the album 1968, the song "Polichinelle" from the EP La Petite was replaced by "Avant la bagarre".)
Teenie Weenie Boppie: "Teenie Weenie Boppie"; "Bébé requin"; "Chanson pour que tu m'aimes un peu"; "Made in France"	1967	—	15	5	1968
Chanson indienne: "Chanson indienne"; "La Fille d'un garçon"; "Toi que je veux"; "Gare à toi... Gargantua"	1968	—	36	—	1968
Dady da da: "Dady da da"; "Le Temps du tempo"; "Allô ! Monsieur là-haut"; "La Vieille fille"	1968	—	—	12	N/A
24/36: "24/36"; "Souffler les bougies"; "Rue de l'abricot"; "Don't Make War, Captain, Make Love"	1968	—	49	—	N/A
Homme tout petit: "Homme tout petit"; "L'Orage" ("La pioggia"); "Les Gens bien élevés"; "L'Hiver est mort"	1969	—	3	1	France Gall (1969) and Ses grands succès
Les Années folles: "Les Années folles"; "Soleil au cœur"; "La Manille et la révolution"; "Les Quatre éléments"	1969	—	—	30	France Gall (1969) and Ses grands succès

== Singles ==
=== French-language singles ===
Title	Year	Peak chart positions														Album
Title	Year	FRA	AUT	BEL (FL)	BEL (WA)	CAN (QC)	DEN	FIN	GER	JPN	NLD	NOR	SPA	SWE	SWI	Album
"Poupée de cire, poupée de son"	1965	1	10	4	3	8	4	5	2	5	6	1	1	6	4	Poupée de cire, poupée de son
"Oh ! Quelle famille"	1967	—	—	—	—	—	—	—	—	—	—	—	—	—	—	FG
"Il neige"	1967	—	—	—	41	—	—	—	—	—	—	—	—	—	—	FG
"L'Écho"	1967	—	—	—	—	—	—	—	—	—	—	—	—	—	—	FG
"Mon p'tit soldat"	1968	—	—	—	48	—	—	—	—	—	—	—	—	—	—	Non-album single
"Baci, baci, baci"	1969	—	—	—	48	5	—	—	—	—	—	—	—	—	—	France Gall (1969) and Ses grands succès
"Zozoï"	1970	—	—	—	—	—	—	—	—	—	—	—	—	—	—	Non-album single
"Les Éléphants"	1970	—	—	—	38	—	—	—	—	—	—	—	—	—	—	Ses grands succès
"C'est cela l'amour"	1971	—	—	—	—	—	—	—	—	—	—	—	—	—	—	Non-album singles
"Caméléon, caméléon"	1971	—	—	—	—	30	—	—	—	—	—	—	—	—	—	Non-album singles
"Frankenstein"	1972	—	—	—	—	—	—	—	—	—	—	—	—	—	—	Cinq minutes d'amour
"Cinq minutes d'amour"	1972	—	—	—	47	—	—	—	—	—	—	—	—	—	—	Cinq minutes d'amour
"Par plaisir"	1973	—	—	—	—	—	—	—	—	—	—	—	—	—	—	Cinq minutes d'amour
"La Déclaration d'amour"	1974	25	—	—	8	—	—	—	—	—	—	—	—	—	—	France Gall (1976)
"Mais, aime-la"	1975	20	—	—	23	—	—	—	—	—	—	—	—	—	—	Non-album single
"Comment lui dire"	1976	20	—	—	17	3	—	—	—	—	—	—	—	—	—	France Gall (1976)
"Ce soir je ne dors pas"	1976	—	—	—	—	—	—	—	—	—	—	—	—	—	—	France Gall (1976)
"Ça balance pas mal à Paris" (with Michel Berger)	1976	27	—	—	21	—	—	—	—	—	—	—	—	—	—	Non-album single
"Musique"	1977	6	—	—	3	5	—	—	—	—	—	—	—	—	—	Dancing Disco
"Si, maman si"	1977	18	—	—	16	—	—	—	—	—	—	—	—	—	—	Dancing Disco
"Le Meilleur de soi-même"	1978	46	—	—	—	—	—	—	—	—	—	—	—	—	—	Dancing Disco
"Viens, je t'emmène"	1978	6	—	—	—	20	—	—	—	—	—	—	—	—	—	Non-album single
"Besoin d'amour"	1978	21	—	—	—	4	—	—	—	—	—	—	—	—	—	Starmania
"Il jouait du piano debout"	1980	1	—	—	—	—	—	—	—	—	26	—	—	—	77	Paris, France
"Bébé comme la vie"	1980	30	—	—	—	—	—	—	—	—	—	—	—	—	—	Paris, France
"Les Aveux" (with Elton John)	1981	6	—	37	—	—	—	—	—	—	46	—	—	—	—	Non-album single
"Résiste"	1982	34	—	—	—	—	—	—	—	—	—	—	—	—	93	Tout pour la musique
"Tout pour la musique"	1982	6	—	—	—	—	—	—	—	—	—	—	—	—	—	Tout pour la musique
"Amor también (Tout le monde chante)"	1982	17	—	—	—	—	—	—	—	—	—	—	—	—	—	Tout pour la musique
"Débranche !"	1984	12	—	—	—	4	—	—	—	—	—	—	—	—	—	Débranche !
"Hong-Kong Star"	1984	1	—	—	—	35	—	—	—	—	—	—	—	—	—	Débranche !
"Calypso"	1985	36	—	—	—	—	—	—	—	—	—	—	—	—	—	Débranche !
"Cézanne peint"	1985	—	—	—	—	—	—	—	—	—	—	—	—	—	—	Débranche !
"Ella, elle l'a"	1987	2	1	—	—	1	2	15	1	—	38	—	—	4	5	Babacar
"Babacar"	1987	11	—	—	—	—	—	—	14	—	—	—	—	—	27	Babacar
"Évidemment"	1988	6	—	—	—	33	—	—	—	—	—	—	—	—	89	Babacar
"Papillon de nuit"	1988	23	—	—	—	2	—	—	—	—	—	—	—	—	—	Babacar
"La Chanson d'Azima"	1989	29	—	—	—	—	—	—	—	—	—	—	—	—	—	Babacar
"Laissez passer les rêves" (with Michel Berger)	1992	37	—	—	—	—	—	—	—	—	—	—	—	—	—	Double jeu
"Superficiel et léger" (with Michel Berger)	1992	42	—	—	—	—	—	—	—	—	—	—	—	—	—	Double jeu
"Les Élans du cœur" (with Michel Berger)	1993	—	—	—	—	—	—	—	—	—	—	—	—	—	—	Double jeu
"La Prisonnière"	2024	—	—	—	—	—	—	—	—	—	—	—	—	—	—	Plus haut

=== German-language singles ===
Title	Year	Peak chart positions
Title	Year	GER
"Das war eine schöne Party"	1965	—
"Wir sind keine Engel"	1966	—
"Die schönste Musik, die es gibt"	1967	—
"Was will ein Boy?"	1967	—
"Haifischbaby"	1967	—
"A Banda (Zwei Apfelsinen im Haar)"	1968	16
"Die Playboys bei den Eskimos"	1968	—
"Der Computer Nr. 3"	1968	24
"Merci, Herr Marquis"	1968	39
"Ein bißchen Goethe, ein bißchen Bonaparte"	1969	14
"Ich liebe dich, so wie du bist"	1969	—
"Links vom Rhein und rechts vom Rhein"	1969	32
"Wassermann und Fisch"	1970	—
"Dann schon eher der Pianoplayer"	1970	—
"Mein Herz kann man nicht kaufen"	1970	—
"Unga Katunga"	1971	—
"Zwei Verliebte zieh'n durch Europa"	1971	—
"Für dreißig Centimes"	1972	—
"Ein bißchen mogeln in der Liebe"	1972	—
"Ich bin zuckersüß"	1972	—
"Ich habe einen Freund in München"	1972	—

=== Italian-language singles ===
Title	Year	Peak chart positions
Title	Year	ITA
"Io sì, tu no"	1965	13
"La pioggia"	1969	13
"Il mio amore è una ruota"	1969	—
"Op! Op! Oplà!"	1969	—
"Come fantomas"	1969	—
"Zozoi"	1970	—

== Non-single album appearances ==
=== As featured artist ===
Title	Year	Album or EP
"Ne cherche pas à plaire" (Mireille Darc featuring France Gall)	1967	Ce ne sera jamais trop
"Mon fils rira du rock'n'roll" (Michel Berger featuring France Gall)	1974	Chansons pour une fan

=== Original cast recordings ===
Title	Year	Album
"Monopolis (Dans les villes de l'an 2000)"	1978	Starmania
"Quand on n'a plus rien à perdre" (with Daniel Balavoine)	1978	Starmania

=== Uncredited vocals ===
Title	Year	Album
"Pauvre Lola" (Serge Gainsbourg)	1964	Gainsbourg Percussions
