= France Gall (disambiguation) =

France Gall was a French singer.

France Gall may also refer to several self-titled albums by the French singer:

- France Gall, commonly known as N'écoute pas les idoles, released in March 1964
- France Gall, commonly known as Mes premières vraies vacances, released in August 1964
- France Gall No. 2, commonly known as Sacré Charlemagne, released in December 1964
- France Gall, commonly known as Poupée de cire, poupée de son, released in 1965
- France Gall No. 6, officially titled FG, released in 1966
- France Gall (1969 album), a compilation album
- France Gall, subtitled Ses grands succès, released in 1973
- France Gall, commonly known as Cinq minutes d'amour, released in 1976
- France Gall (1976 album), a studio album
- France Gall, a compilation album released in 1989
- France Gall, a compilation album released in 2017

== See also ==
- France Gall discography
