= France (album) =

Studio album by France Gall
- Released: 19 March 1996
- Recorded: Los Angeles, United States; Minneapolis, United States; Suresnes, France
- Genre: Chanson; R&B; rock
- Length: 64:22
- Label: WEA
- Producer: Bruck Dawit; Kirk Johnson; Marcus Miller; Ricky Peterson; Michael Railton; Stocker

France Gall chronology
Double jeu (1992)	France (1996)

Professional ratings
Review scores
Source	Rating
AllMusic	2.5/5 stars
Forces Parallèles	1/5 stars

France is the fifteenth and final studio album by French singer France Gall, released in March 1996.

Being her first album of new material in nine years since Babacar in 1987, discounting Double jeu, her collaboration with her husband Michel Berger four years prior as well as three live albums released during the lengthy gap such as Le Tour de France 88 (1988), Simple je – Débranchée à Bercy (1993) and Simple je – Rebranchée à Bercy (1994), this would be her last studio album, though she would release two more live albums titled Concert public Olympia / Concert acoustique M6 (1997), before her retirement from the music industry and Pleyel (2005) before her death in 2018.

== Track listing ==
All tracks are written by Michel Berger, except where noted.

No.	Title	Lyrics	Producer	Length
1.	"Plus haut"		Ricky Peterson	4:20
2.	"À quoi il sert ?"		Ricky Peterson	3:44
3.	"Laissez passer les rêves"		Stocker, Michael Railton	5:13
4.	"Que l'amour est bizarre"		Ricky Peterson	4:10
5.	"Débranche!"		Ricky Peterson	4:45
6.	"Lumière du jour"		Ricky Peterson	5:03
7.	"Résiste"		Ricky Peterson, Kirk Johnson	4:47
8.	"La Minute de silence"		Marcus Miller	4:27
9.	"Privée d'amour"		Stocker, Michael Railton	4:38
10.	"Évidemment"		Ricky Peterson	4:30
11.	"Ella, elle l'a"		Ricky Peterson, Kirk Johnson	5:10
12.	"Les Princes des villes"		Kirk Johnson	6:09
13.	"Message personnel"	Michel Berger and Françoise Hardy	Ricky Peterson	3:44
14.	"La Légende de Jim" ( (Note: The track was added in the new edition of the album (the one with an orange cover), released on 29 November 1996.))	Luc Plamondon	Bruck Dawit	3:35

== Personnel ==
- Michael Mishaw - background vocals
- Bernadette Barlow - background vocals

== Certifications ==
Region	Certification	Certified units/sales
France (SNEP)	Platinum	300,000^{*}
^{*} Sales figures based on certification alone.
