= France Gall (1969 album) =

Compilation album by France Gall
- Released: April 1969
- Label: La Compagnie
- Producer: Norbert Saada

France Gall chronology
| Vive la France Gall (1968) | France Gall (1969) | Die grossen Erfolge (1969) |

Singles from France Gall
- 1. "Baci, baci, baci" Released: March 1969

France Gall is a compilation album by French singer France Gall, gathering material from her period with the record label La Compagnie. Released exclusively in Canada in April 1969 as her only LP for the label, it contains tracks previously released on EPs and singles, along with two new Italian-language songs.

== Background ==
The album brings together material from the 1969 EPs Homme tout petit and Les Années folles, as well as the 1969 single "Baci, baci, baci". It also introduces two new titles, "Il mio amore è una ruota" (presented as "La ruotta") and "Matrimonio d'amore". The later compilation Ses grands succès (1973) by Musidisc features the same core material, but exchanged these two songs for three others.

== Track listing ==
Side A
| No. | Title | Lyrics | Music | Length |
|---|---|---|---|---|
| 1. | "Homme tout petit" | Jean-Michel Rivat, Frank Thomas | Jean-Pierre Bourtayre | 2:16 |
| 2. | "Les Gens bien élevés" | Frank Gérald | Hubert Giraud | 1:45 |
| 3. | "L'Hiver est mort" | Robert Gall | Patrice Gall | 3:05 |
| 4. | "L'Orage" ("La pioggia") | Jean-Michel Rivat, Frank Thomas | Gianni Argenio, Corrado Conti, Daniele Pace, Mario Panzeri | 2:45 |
| 5. | "La ruotta" ("Il mio amore è una ruota") | Daniele Pace, Mario Panzeri | Elio Isola | 2:48 |
| 6. | "Matrimonio d'amore" | Franco Califano | Gene Colonnello | 2:04 |

Side B
| No. | Title | Lyrics | Music | Length |
|---|---|---|---|---|
| 1. | "La Torpédo bleue" ("Il topolino blu") | Robert Gall | Daniele Pace, Mario Panzeri, Lorenzo Pilat | 3:00 |
| 2. | "Baci, baci, baci" | Eddy Marnay | Sergio Bardotti, Franco Bracardi | 2:31 |
| 3. | "Soleil au cœur" | Robert Gall | Henri Bourtayre, Jean-Pierre Bourtayre | 2:31 |
| 4. | "La Manille et la révolution" | Boris Bergman | Hubert Giraud | 2:07 |
| 5. | "Les Années folles" ("Gentlemen Please") | Boris Bergman | Barbara Ruskin | 3:05 |
| 6. | "Les Quatre éléments" | Patrice Gall | Patrice Gall | 3:27 |
