= Sacré Charlemagne (album) =

Studio album by France Gall
- Released: December 1964
- Genres: Yé-yé, chanson
- Length: 19:31
- Label: Philips Records

France Gall chronology
Mes premières vraies vacances (1964)	Sacré Charlemagne (1964)	Poupée de cire, poupée de son (1965)

France Gall No. 2, commonly called Sacré Charlemagne after the opening track, is an album by French singer France Gall. It was released on a 10-inch LP record in December 1964. The album is Gall's second 10-inch record, but her third LP overall.

The album is a compilation of the extended plays Laisse tomber les filles (1964), and Sacré Charlemagne (1964).

== Track listing ==
Side A
No.	Title	Lyrics	Music	Length
1.	"Sacré Charlemagne"	Robert Gall	Georges Liferman	2:54
2.	"Nounours"	Maurice Tézé	Guy Magenta	2:17
3.	"Le premier chagrin d'amour"	Robert Gall	Claude-Henri Vic	2:27
4.	"On t'avait prévenue"	Robert Gall and Vline Buggy	Guy Magenta	2:26

Side B
No.	Title	Lyrics	Music	Length
1.	"Christiansen"	Maurice Vidalin	Jacques Datin	2:39
2.	"Au clair de la lune" (based on the traditional song of the same name)	Robert Gall	Alain Goraguer	2:09
3.	"Laisse tomber les filles"	Serge Gainsbourg	Serge Gainsbourg	2:14
4.	"Bonne nuit"	Robert Gall	Alain Goraguer	2:25
