= Musique =

Musique is the French word for music.

Musique may also refer to:

== Music ==
- Musique (disco band), a 1970s studio band produced by Patrick Adams
- Musique, a British dance act consisting of Moussa Clarke and Nick Hanson best known for their 2001 song "New Year's Dub", which samples the U2 song "New Year's Day".

=== Albums ===
- Musique (album), a 2000 album by Theatre of Tragedy
- Musique Vol. 1 1993–2005, an anthology of Daft Punk tracks
- La Musique (fr), an album by Dominique A, 2009

=== Songs ===
- "Musique", a 1977 single by France Gall from Dancing Disco, written by Michel Berger
- "Musique", a song by Herb Alpert from Just You and Me, 1976
- "Musique", a song by Daft Punk from Musique Vol. 1 1993–2005
- La Musique (Angelica), a 1967 song of Star Academy France

== Radio stations ==
- France Musique, a French radio station
- Ici Musique, a Canadian French-language radio station
- RTS Option Musique, a Swiss French-language radio station

== See also ==
- Musique concrète
- Musique-Cordiale
