= 1968 (album) =

Studio album by France Gall
- Released: January 1968
- Genres: Psychedelic pop; yé-yé
- Length: 31:49
- Label: Philips
- Producer: Denis Bourgeois

France Gall chronology
FG (1966)	1968 (1968)	France Gall (1976)

Professional ratings
Review scores
Source	Rating
AllMusic	4/5 stars
Forces Parallèles	1/5 stars

1968 is the seventh studio album by French singer France Gall, released in January 1968 on Philips Records. Released during the decline of the yé-yé era, the album features a psychedelic sound influenced by the Beatles' Revolver and Sgt. Pepper's Lonely Hearts Club Band.

The album is a compilation of the extended plays La Petite (1967), Teenie Weenie Boppie (1967), and Chanson indienne (1968). However, the album features the song "Avant la bagarre", instead of the La Petite track "Polichinelle".

== Track listing ==
Side A
No.	Title	Lyrics	Music	Length
1.	"Toi que je veux"	Jean-Michel Rivat and Frank Thomas	Joe Dassin	3:01
2.	"Chanson indienne"	Robert Gall	David Whitaker	2:37
3.	"Gare à toi... Gargantua"	Frédéric Botton	Frédéric Botton	2:13
4.	"Avant la bagarre"	Ralph Bernet	Guy Magenta	2:44
5.	"Chanson pour que tu m'aimes un peu"	Robert Gall	Patrice Gall	2:26
6.	"Nefertiti"	Serge Gainsbourg	Serge Gainsbourg	2:24

Side B
No.	Title	Lyrics	Music	Length
1.	"La Fille d'un garçon"	Maurice Vidalin	Jacques Datin	2:27
2.	"Bébé requin"	Jean-Michel Rivat and Frank Thomas	Joe Dassin	2:46
3.	"Teenie weenie boppie"	Serge Gainsbourg	Serge Gainsbourg	3:00
4.	"Les Yeux bleus"	Robert Gall	Claude-Henri Vic	2:34
5.	"Made in France"	Maurice Vidalin	Jacques Datin	2:52
6.	"La Petite" (duet with Maurice Biraud)	Robert Gall and Mya Simille	Guy Magenta	2:45
