= Baby pop =

Studio album by France Gall
- Released: October 1966
- Genres: Pop, yé-yé, chanson
- Length: 27:57
- Label: Philips Records
- Producer: Denis Bourgeois

France Gall chronology
| Poupée de cire, poupée de son (1965) | Baby pop (1966) | FG (1966) |

Professional ratings
Review scores
| Source | Rating |
|---|---|
| AllMusic | 4/5 stars |
| Forces Parallèles | 2/5 stars |

Baby pop is the fifth studio album by French singer France Gall. It was released on the 12-inch format in October 1966. On the recordings, Gall is accompanied by Alain Goraguer and his orchestra.

The album is a compilation of the extended plays Attends ou va-t'en (1965), L'Amérique (1965), and Baby pop (1966).

== Track listing ==
Side A
| No. | Title | Lyrics | Music | Length |
|---|---|---|---|---|
| 1. | "Baby pop" | Serge Gainsbourg | Serge Gainsbourg | 3:25 |
| 2. | "Faut-il que je t'aime" | Maurice Vidalin | Jacques Datin | 2:13 |
| 3. | "Le Temps de la rentrée" | Robert Gall | Patrice Gall | 1:37 |
| 4. | "Attends ou va-t'en" | Serge Gainsbourg | Serge Gainsbourg | 2:35 |
| 5. | "Mon bateau de nuit" | Pierre Delanoë | Alain Goraguer | 2:33 |
| 6. | "L'Amérique" | Eddy Marnay | Guy Magenta | 2:23 |

Side B
| No. | Title | Lyrics | Music | Length |
|---|---|---|---|---|
| 1. | "Cet air-là" | Robert Gall | Alain Goraguer | 2:35 |
| 2. | "C'est pas facile d'être une fille" | Pierre Delanoë | Guy Magenta and Jean-Pierre Bourtayre | 2:36 |
| 3. | "Nous ne sommes pas des anges" | Serge Gainsbourg | Serge Gainsbourg | 2:45 |
| 4. | "On se ressemble toi et moi" | Robert Gall | Claude-Henri Vic | 2:49 |
| 5. | "Deux oiseaux" | Robert Gall | André Popp | 2:26 |
| 6. | "Et des baisers" | Robert Gall | Alain Goraguer | 2:20 |
