= Poupée de cire, poupée de son (album) =

Studio album by France Gall
- Released: April 1965
- Genres: Yé-yé, chanson
- Length: 29:31
- Label: Philips Records
- Producer: Denis Bourgeois

France Gall chronology
| Sacré Charlemagne (1964) | Poupée de cire, poupée de son (1965) | Baby pop (1966) |

Professional ratings
Review scores
| Source | Rating |
|---|---|
| AllMusic | 3.5/5 stars |
| Forces Parallèles | 2/5 stars |

France Gall, commonly called Poupée de cire, poupée de son after the opening track, is an album by French singer France Gall. It was released in April 1965 as her fourth LP record. On the recordings, Gall is accompanied by Alain Goraguer and his orchestra.

The album is a reissue of the 10-inch LP Sacré Charlemagne (1964), with four additional tracks from the extended play Poupée de cire, poupée de son (1965).

== Track listing ==
Side A
| No. | Title | Lyrics | Music | Length |
|---|---|---|---|---|
| 1. | "Poupée de cire, poupée de son" | Serge Gainsbourg | Serge Gainsbourg | 2:34 |
| 2. | "Le Cœur qui jazze" | Robert Gall | Alain Goraguer | 2:47 |
| 3. | "Christiansen" | Maurice Vidalin | Jacques Datin | 2:39 |
| 4. | "Laisse tomber les filles" | Serge Gainsbourg | Serge Gainsbourg | 2:14 |
| 5. | "Le Premier chagrin d'amour" | Robert Gall | Claude-Henri Vic | 2:27 |
| 6. | "On t'avait prévenue" | Robert Gall and Vline Buggy | Guy Magenta | 2:26 |

Side B
| No. | Title | Lyrics | Music | Length |
|---|---|---|---|---|
| 1. | "Dis à ton capitaine" | Maurice Tézé | Guy Magenta | 2:08 |
| 2. | "Sacré Charlemagne" | Robert Gall | Georges Liferman | 2:54 |
| 3. | "Un prince charmant" | Maurice Vidalin | Jacques Datin | 2:31 |
| 4. | "Au clair de la lune" | Robert Gall | Alain Goraguer, based on a traditional song | 2:09 |
| 5. | "Nounours" | Maurice Tézé | Guy Magenta | 2:17 |
| 6. | "Bonne nuit" | Robert Gall | Alain Goraguer | 2:25 |
