= Diego, libre dans sa tête =

1981 song by France Gall

Song by France Gall

from the album Tout pour la musique
- Language: French
- English title: Diego, free in his head
- Released: 10 December 1981
- Recorded: 1981
- Studio: Studio Gang; Paris, France
- Genre: Chanson
- Length: 2:58
- Label: WEA, Atlantic
- Songwriter: Michel Berger
- Producer: Michel Berger

"Diego, libre dans sa tête"

Song by Michel Berger

from the album Voyou
- Released: 17 February 1983
- Studio: Studio Gang; Paris, France
- Genre: Chanson
- Length: 2:38
- Label: WEA, Apache
- Songwriter: Michel Berger
- Producer: Michel Berger

"Diego, libre dans sa tête" (transl. "Diego, free in his head") is a 1981 song written by Michel Berger for his wife France Gall for her studio album Tout pour la musique, on which it is the eighth track. Two years later, Berger himself recorded his own version of the song. In 1991, it gained popularity when Johnny Hallyday released a live cover which became a top ten hit in France.

== Background and versions ==
"Diego, libre dans sa tête" was originally written by Berger for Gall. Lyrically, it denounces the repression exerted by dictators like Augusto Pinochet in Latin America; "Diego" is the fictional name of a political opponent imprisoned only "for a few words that he thought so strong". The song presents this situation as unfair compared to that of the narrator who is free to danse, sing or laugh. In June 1984, Gall performed the song with guitarist Kamil Rustam in the French television show Champs-Élysées, in the presence of a former political prisoner, Argentine pianist Miguel Ángel Estrella. She also performed the song during many of her concert tours, available in live versions on France Gall / Palais des sports (1982), France Gall au Zénith (1985), Concert public Olympia / Concert acoustique M6 (1997), and Pleyel (released in 2005, but recorded in 1994). In 1983, Berger himself recorded his own version of "Diego, libre dans sa tête" for his album Voyou; a live version was included on Michel Berger au Zénith in 1986, and in 2012, the studio version charted at number 169 on the French Singles Chart.

== Johnny Hallyday version ==
"Diego, libre dans sa tête"

Single by Johnny Hallyday

from the album Dans la chaleur de Bercy
- B-side: "Mon P'tit Loup (Ça va faire mal) Betty Lou Is Going Out Tonight (Bercy 90)"
- Released: 18 March 1991
- Recorded: 1990
- Studio: Bercy, Paris
- Genre: Rock, chanson
- Length: 4:02
- Label: Philips
- Songwriter: Michel Berger
- Producer: Jean-Pierre Janiaud

Johnny Hallyday singles chronology
"Je ne suis pas un héros" (1990)	"Diego, libre dans sa tête" (1991)	"Ça ne change pas un homme" (1991)

In 1990, Johnny Hallyday covered the song during his concert at the Palais Omnisports de Paris-Bercy and this version was released as the second single from his 1991 album Dans la chaleur de Bercy. As it became a popular song in Hallyday's discography, it was regularly performed on stage during his next concert tours and thus included on the live albums Bercy 92, Lorada Tour (1996), Stade de France 98 Johnny allume le feu (1998), Olympia 2000, Parc des Princes 2003, Hallyday Bercy 2003 (released in 2020), Tour 66 : Stade de France 2009, On Stage (2013), Born Rocker Tour (2013), Live au Beacon Theatre de New-York 2014 (released in 2020). Two music videos for "Diego, libre dans sa tête" were recorded: the first one for the 1991 release, and the second one for a 2019 symphonic version released in 2019.

=== Chart performance ===
In France, the 1990 live version of "Diego, libre dans sa tête" debuted at number 29 on the chart edition of 20 April 1991 and climbed to number ten in its sixth week, and remained on the top 50 for a total of 16 weeks. On the Eurochart Hot 100 Singles, it started at number 76 on 1 June 1991, reached a peak of number 56 in its second week, and appeared on the chart for six weeks. After Hallyday's death in December 2017, the song briefly charted at a peak of number 60 in France and 58 in Switzerland.

=== Track listings ===
- 7" single
1. "Diego, libre dans sa tête" (Bercy 90) — 4:02
2. "Mon p'tit loup (Ça va faire mal)" (Bercy 90) — 3:40
- Cassette
1. "Diego, libre dans sa tête" (Bercy 90) — 4:02
2. "Mon p'tit loup (Ça va faire mal)" (Bercy 90) — 3:40
- CD maxi
1. "Diego, libre dans sa tête" (Bercy 90) — 4:02
2. "Mon p'tit loup (Ça va faire mal)" (Bercy 90) — 3:40
3. "Be Bop a Lula"

=== Charts ===
Chart (1991)	Peak position
Europe (Eurochart Hot 100)	56
France (SNEP)	10

Chart (2017)	Peak position
France (SNEP)	60
Switzerland (Schweizer Hitparade)	58

Chart (2019)	Peak position
France (SNEP)	196

== Legacy ==
A number of cover versions has been recorded throughout years and clearly presented as tributes to Berger, Gall or Hallyday. In 1999, Véronique Sanson covered the song on her tribute to Berger album D'un papillon à une étoile, and a live version is included on her 2000 album Avec vous. In 2002, during the second edition of Star Academy France, Georges-Alain Jones covered the song for the album Star Academy chante Michel Berger. In 2013, Jenifer also covered the song as a duet with Chjami Aghjalesi on her tribute to Gall album Ma Déclaration; this version reached number 164 on the French Singles Chart. In 2017, Michaël Gregorio performed the song in the French program Touche pas à mon poste ! as a tribute to Johnny Hallyday, and his version was praised in medias as moving.
