= Ses grands succès (France Gall album) =

Studio album by France Gall

Compilation album by France Gall
- Released: September 1973
- Genre: Chanson
- Label: Musidisc
- Producer: Philippe Thomas

France Gall chronology
Le disque d'or de France Gall (1968)	Ses grands succès (1973)	Cinq minutes d'amour (1976)

Ses grands succès (transl. 'Her Great Successes'), also known as Les Années folles / Homme tout petit, is a compilation album by French singer France Gall, first released in September 1973.

The album comprises songs released in 1969–1970 on EPs on the label La Compagnie. Originally released by Musidisc, the album was reissued by Bel Air in January 1974. Another edition was released in January 1978 as part of Musidisc's Collection Or ('Gold Collection').

== Track listing ==
Side A
No.	Title	Lyrics	Music	Length
1.	"Homme tout petit"	Jean-Michel Rivat, Frank Thomas	Jean-Pierre Bourtayre	2:16
2.	"L'Orage" ( (Note: Adaptation of "La pioggia"))	Jean-Michel Rivat, Frank Thomas	Gianni Argenio, Corrado Conti, Daniele Pace, Mario Panzeri	2:45
3.	"Les Gens bien élevés"	Frank Gérald	Hubert Giraud	1:45
4.	"L'Hiver est mort"	Robert Gall	Patrice Gall	3:05
5.	"Shakespeare et pire encore"	Boris Bergman	Maurice Dulac	2:20
6.	"La Manille et la révolution"	Boris Bergman	Hubert Giraud	2:07
7.	"Les Quatre éléments"	Patrice Gall	Patrice Gall	3:27

Side B
No.	Title	Lyrics	Music	Length
1.	"Les Années folles" ( (Note: Adaptation of "Gentlemen Please"))	Boris Bergman	Barbara Ruskin	3:05
2.	"La Torpédo bleue" ( (Note: Adaptation of "Il topolino blu"))	Robert Gall	Panzeri, Pilat	3:00
3.	"Bacci bacci" ( (Note: Adaptation of "Baci, baci, baci"))	Eddy Marnay	Bardotti, Tallino	2:31
4.	"Les Éléphants"	Jean Schmitt	Jean Géral	3:07
5.	"Merry merry o !"	Frank Gérald	Raymond Vastano	3:10
6.	"Soleil au cœur"	Robert Gall	Henri Bourtayre, Jean-Pierre Bourtayre	2:31
