= Mes premières vraies vacances =

Studio album by France Gall
- Released: August 1964
- Genres: Yé-yé, chanson
- Length: 28:49
- Label: Philips Records
- Producer: Denis Bourgeois

France Gall chronology
N'écoute pas les idoles (1964)	Mes premières vraies vacances (1964)	Sacré Charlemagne (1964)

Professional ratings
Review scores
Source	Rating
Forces Parallèles	2/5 stars

France Gall, commonly called Mes premières vraies vacances after the opening track, is the second album by French singer France Gall. It was released on a 12-inch LP record in August 1964.

The album is a reissue of the 10-inch LP N'écoute pas les idoles (1964), with four additional tracks from the extended play Jazz à gogo (1964).

== Track listing ==
Side A
No.	Title	Lyrics	Music	Length
1.	"Mes premières vraies vacances"	Maurice Vidalin	Jacques Datin	2:14
2.	"Jazz à gogo"	Robert Gall	Alain Goraguer	2:27
3.	"Soyons sages"	Robert Gall	Guy Magenta	2:33
4.	"Les Rubans et la fleur"	Robert Gall	André Popp	2:53
5.	"Pense à moi"	Robert Gall and France Gall	Alain Goraguer	2:39
6.	"Ça va je t'aime" (adaptation of "Hip-Huggers")	French adaptation by André Salvet and Claude Carrère	Edna Lewis & Robert H. Moseley	2:18

Side B
No.	Title	Lyrics	Music	Length
1.	"La Cloche" (adaptation of "My Boyfriend Got a Beatle Haircut")	French adaptation by André Salvet	Jack Wolf and Maurice "Bugs" Bower	2:07
2.	"N'écoute pas les idoles"	Serge Gainsbourg	Serge Gainsbourg	1:49
3.	"J'entends cette musique"	Robert Gall	Jacques Datin, based on the adagio by Remo Giazotto	2:38
4.	"Ne dis pas aux copains"	Maurice Tézé	Guy Magenta	2:38
5.	"Ne sois pas si bête" (adaptation of "Stand a Little Closer")	French adaptation by Pierre Delanoë	Jack Wolf and Maurice "Bugs" Bower	2:22
6.	"Si j'étais garçon"	Pierre Cour	Jean Claudric	2:11
