= Jean Hamburger =

French physician, surgeon and essayist

- Born: 15 July 1909; Paris, France
- Died: 1 February 1992 (aged 82); Paris, France
- Education: University of Paris
- Occupation: Member of the Académie française
- Spouse: Annette Haas
- Children: Michel Berger
- Relatives: Raphaël Hamburger (grandson); France Gall (daughter-in-law)

Jean Hamburger (15 July 1909 – 1 February 1992) was a French physician, surgeon and essayist. He is particularly known for his contribution to nephrology, and for having performed the first renal transplantation in France in 1952.

== Biography ==
Hamburger was born to a Jewish family in Paris. Together with René Kuss, Hamburger defined the precise methods and rules for conducting renal transplantation surgery and is attributed with founding the medical discipline of nephrology. In 1952, at Necker Hospital in Paris, he performed the first successful renal transplant surgery in France, on a 16-year-old carpenter, Marius Renard who damaged his only kidney when he fell off scaffolding, using a kidney donated by the subject's mother. The organ failed, but the rejection was staved off for three weeks, a record at the time. In 1955, he created the very first artificial kidney. Hamburger is credited with major breakthroughs in renal transplants: first prolonged success in 1953, first unqualified success between twins in 1959 and non-twins in 1962. He also authored basic research on the immunological basis of kidney disease, graft immunology and auto-immune diseases.

== Personal life ==
Hamburger married concert pianist Annette Haas and had 3 children: Michel, Bernard and Françoise. His son Michel was the well-known French singer-songwriter, Michel Berger. His grandson Raphael Hamburger is a French music supervisor.

In the 1950s, Hamburger contracted a lung infection which weakened him severely. He died on 1 February 1992 in Paris. Just six months later, on 2 August 1992, his son Michel Berger died suddenly of a massive heart attack.

== Honours and awards ==
He was elected to life membership to Seat 4 of the Académie française on 18 April 1985, succeeding Pierre Emmanuel, in an official ceremony which took place on 16 January 1986. Upon his death, Cardinal Albert Decourtray was elected to fill his seat on 1 July 1993.

- Member of the Académie Nationale de Médecine
- Grand officier de la Légion d'honneur
- Grand officier de l'ordre national du Mérite
- Commandeur des Arts et des Lettres

== Published works ==
- 1972 La Puissance et la Fragilité (Flammarion)
- 1975 Dictionnaire de médecine, préface et direction (Flammarion)
- 1976 L’Homme et les Hommes (Flammarion)
- 1979 Demain, les autres (Flammarion)
- 1981 Un jour, un homme... (Flammarion)
- 1982 Introduction au langage de la médecine (Flammarion)
- 1983 Le journal d’Harvey (Flammarion)
- 1984 La Raison et la Passion (Le Seuil)
- 1985 Le Dieu foudroyé (Flammarion)
- 1986 Le Miel et la Ciguë (Le Seuil)
- 1988 Monsieur Littré (Flammarion)
- 1988 La plus belle aventure du monde (Gallimard)
- 1988 Zouchy et quelques autres histoires (Flammarion)
- 1989 Dictionnaire promenade (Le Seuil)
- 1990 La Puissance et la Fragilité. Vingt ans après (Flammarion)
- 1990 Le Livre de l’aventure humaine (Gallimard)
- 1991 Les Belles Imprudences, Réflexion sur la condition humaine (Odile Jacob)
