= Michèle Arnaud =

French singer

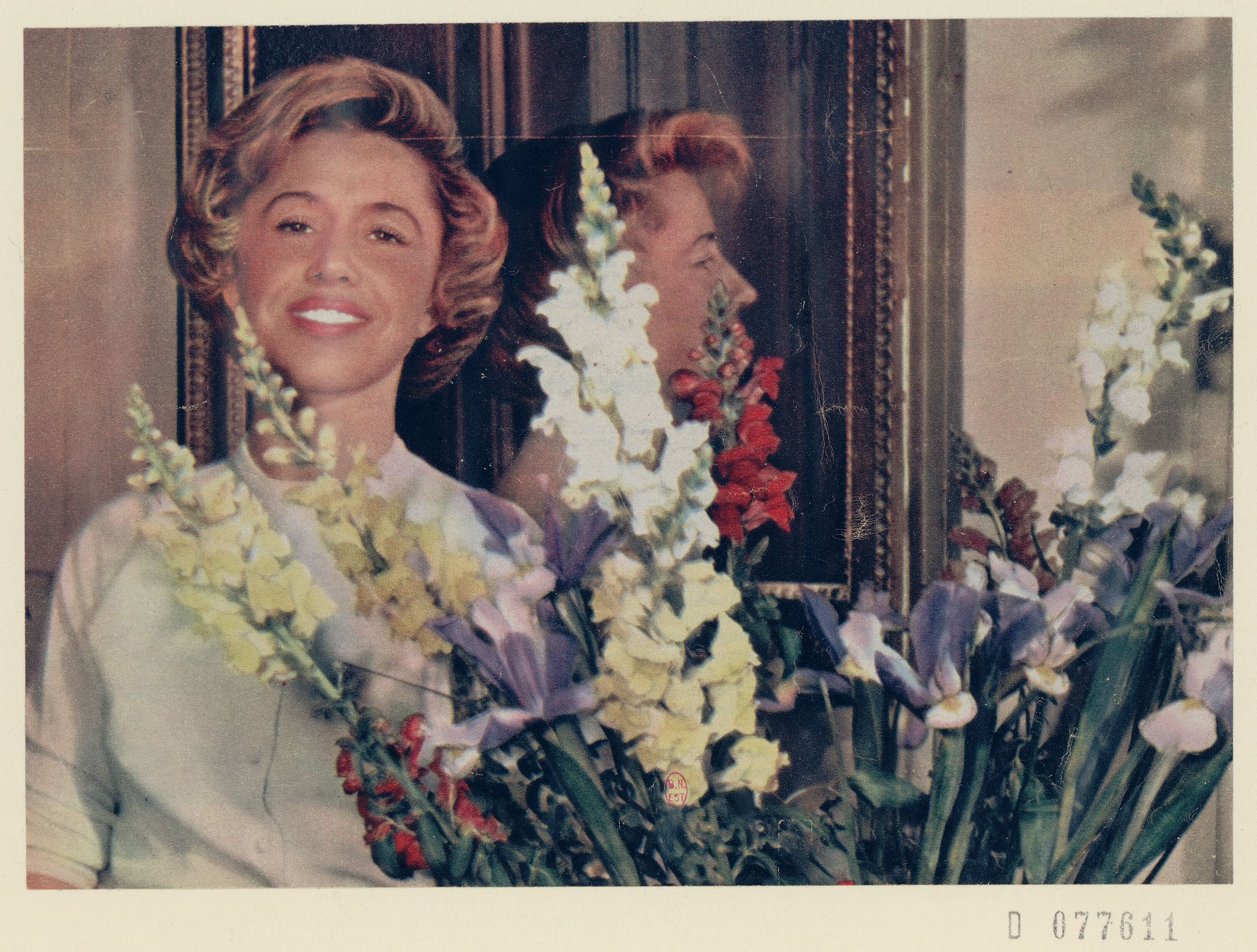
- Portrait of Michèle Arnauld

Background information
- Born: Micheline Caré; 18 March 1919; Toulon, France
- Died: 30 March 1998 (aged 79) Maisons-Laffitte, France
- Genres: Chanson
- Occupations: Singer, producer
- Years active: 1952–1978
- Label: EMI

Michèle Arnaud (French pronunciation: [miʃɛl aʁno], born Micheline Caré; 18 March 1919 – 30 March 1998), was a French singer, recording artist, and director. She was buried on 18 September 1998 at Montparnasse Cemetery. She is the mother of the singer Dominique Walter and the photographer Florence Gruère.

Arnaud was awarded a Chevalier de la Légion d'honneur and Ordre des Arts et des Lettres. She was the first entrant for Luxembourg in the first edition of the Eurovision Song Contest in 1956.

== Biography ==
After completing her primary education in Cherbourg, she went to Paris where she took a course at the Ecole Libre des Sciences Politiques. She gained two degrees in philosophy. Simultaneously with her studies, she regularly frequented cabaret clubs such as Le Tabou and La Rose Rouge.

In 1956 she was the first entrant for Luxembourg in the first edition of the Eurovision Song Contest in Lugano, participating with the songs Ne crois pas and Les amants de minuit, but was unsuccessful in winning.

On 11 July 1962, she appeared in the first-ever live television transmission via satellite from France to the United States. Because of the orbital path of the newly launched American satellite, Telstar, the program lasted only twenty minutes. Also appearing that evening was Yves Montand.

== Discography ==
=== Compilations ===
==== Gainsbourg sung by... ====
- 2 CD EMI Music France 854067-2, 1996 and reedited in June 2006, all songs of Serge Gainsbourg sung by Michèle Arnaud (CD 1) :
1. La Recette de l'amour fou, 1958
2. Douze belles dans la peau, 1958
3. Jeunes femmes et vieux messieurs, 1958
4. La Femme des uns sous le corps des autres, 1958
5. Ronsard 58, lyrics by Serge Barthélémy and music by Serge Gainsbourg, 1959
6. Il était une oie, 1959
7. La Chanson de Prévert, 1961
8. Les Goémons, 1962
9. La Javanaise, 1963
10. Les Papillons noirs, a duo with Serge Gainsbourg, 1966
11. Ballade des oiseaux de croix, 1966
12. Les Papillons noirs, 1966
13. Ne dis rien, from the musical Anna, 1967
14. Rêves et caravelles, 1969

==== Michèle Arnaud ====
- 2 CD EMI Music France 520486-2 (1999)
  - CD 1:
1. Voulez-vous jouer avec moi ?, texts by Marcel Achard and music by Georges van Parys, 1956
2. Ne crois pas, texts and music by Christian Guitreau, 1956
3. La rue s'allume, texts by Louis Ducreux and music by André Popp – Louis Ducreux, 1955
4. Quand on s'est connu, texts and music by Jean-Pierre Moulin, 1958
5. L'Éloge des cocus, texts by Pierre Lambry and music by Simone Lorencin, 1957
6. Zon zon zon, texts by Maurice Vidalin and music by Jacques Datin, 1957
7. Sous le pont Mirabeau, poem by Guillaume Apollinaire and music by Jacques Lasry, 1955
8. Julie, texts by Maurice Vidalin and music by Jacques Datin, 1957
9. Sans l'amour de toi, paroles de Claude Delécluse and music by Michelle Senlis – Paul Misraki, 1957
10. Morte Fontaine, texts by Rolland Valade and music by Jean-Michel Arnaud, 1959
11. Van Gogh, texts by Pierre Lambry and music by Jacques Datin, 1959
12. Napoli, texts and music by Roger Riffard, 1960
13. Loulou de la Vache Noire, texts and music by Roger Riffard, 1960
14. Deux tourterelles, texts by Eddy Marnay and music by Emil Stern, 1957
15. Pourquoi mon dieu, French adaptation by Georges Moustaki et Jacques Kabanellis from Manos Hadjidakis, 1962
16. Pauvre Verlaine, texts and music by Salvatore Adamo, 1968
17. Amour perdu, texts and music by Salvatore Adamo, 1963
18. Toi qui marchais, texts by Jean-Pierre Chevrier and music by Guy Bontempelli, 1963
19. L'Inconnue, texts and music by Roger Riffard, 1960
20. Il y a des années, texts and music by Roger Riffard, 1960
  - CD 2:
1. Angelo, texts and music by Robert Ardray, 1964
2. Comment dire, texts and music by Guy Bontempelli, 1964
3. Et après ?, texts by Armand Seggian and music by Jacques Pezet, 1964
4. La Chanson de Tessa, texts by Jean Giraudoux and music by Maurice Jaubert, 1965
5. Ne vous mariez pas les filles, texts by Boris Vian and music by Alain Goraguer, 1964
6. Si les eaux de la mer, texts by Bernard Dimey and music by Henri Salvador, 1965
7. Les Papillons noirs, a duo with Serge Gainsbourg, texts and music by Serge Gainsbourg, 1966
8. Ballade des oiseaux de croix, texts and music by Serge Gainsbourg, 1966
9. Chanson sur une seule note, French adaptation by Eddy Marnay of Samba de una nota so from the Brazilian texts by Newton Mandonga, music by Antonio Carlos Jobim, 1962
10. Sans toi, texts by Agnès Varda and music by Michel Legrand from the movie Cléo from 5 to 7, 1963
11. Un soir, texts by Bernard Dimey and music by Henri Salvador, 1964
12. La Marche arrière, texts by Boris Vian and music by Henri Salvador, 1964
13. Je croyais, adaptation by Hugues Auffray and Georges Aber from Yesterday by John Lennon and Paul McCartney, 1966
14. La Grammaire et l'amour, texts and music by Guy Bontempelli, 1966
15. La Chabraque, texts by Marcel Aymé and music by Guy Béart, 1960
16. Marie d'Aquitaine, texts by René Ruet and music by André Grassi, 1962
17. Cherbourg avait raison, texts by Jacques Larue and Eddy Marnay, music by Guy Magenta, 1961
18. La Chanson des vieux amants, texts by Jacques Brel and music by Gérard Jouannest, 1967
19. Le Bleu de l'été, French adaptation by Henri Contet of Green Leaves of Summer from the American texts of Paul Francis Webster, music by Dimitri Tiomkin from the movie Alamo, 1961
20. Timoléon le jardinier, texts and music by Roger Riffard, 1960

Awards and achievements
| New title | Luxembourg in the Eurovision Song Contest; 1956, "Ne crois pas"(1956) and "Les amants de minuit"(1956) | Succeeded by Danièle Dupré with "Amours mortes (tant de peine)" |
