= FG (album) =

Studio album by France Gall
- Released: November 1966
- Genre: Yé-yé
- Length: 28:34
- Label: Philips Records

France Gall chronology
Baby pop (1966)	FG (1966)	1968 (1968)

Professional ratings
Review scores
Source	Rating
AllMusic	4/5 stars
Forces Parallèles	1/5 stars

FG, also known as France Gall No. 6, or Les Sucettes after its most popular track, is an album by French singer France Gall. It was released in November 1966 as her sixth LP record. On the recordings, Gall is accompanied by Alain Goraguer and his orchestra.

== Track listing ==
Side A
No.	Title	Lyrics	Music	Length
1.	"Tu n'as pas le droit"	Jean-Max Rivière	Gérard Bourgeois	2:04
2.	"Il neige"	Jean-Max Rivière	Gérard Bourgeois	2:22
3.	"Oh ! Quelle famille"	Robert Gall	Georges Liferman	2:00
4.	"Les Leçons particulières"	Maurice Vidalin	Jacques Datin and Alain Goraguer	2:35
5.	"J'ai retrouvé mon chien"	Pierre Delanoë and Maurice Tézé	Alain Goraguer	2:40
6.	"Bonsoir John-John"	Gilles Thibaut	Claude-Henri Vic	2:15

Side B
No.	Title	Lyrics	Music	Length
1.	"Celui que j'aime"	Robert Gall	Patrice Gall	2:33
2.	"L'Écho"	Robert Gall	Alain Goraguer	2:15
3.	"La Rose des vents"	Maurice Vidalin	Jacques Datin	2:25
4.	"La Guerre des chansons"	Robert Gall	Patrice Gall	2:33
5.	"Les Sucettes"	Serge Gainsbourg	Serge Gainsbourg	2:38
6.	"Quand on est ensemble"	Robert Gall and Roland Berthier	Franck Pourcel and Raymond Lefèvre	2:14
