= Tout pour la musique =

Studio album by France Gall
- Released: 10 December 1981
- Genre: Chanson
- Length: 37:05
- Labels: WEA, Atlantic
- Producer: Michel Berger

France Gall chronology
Paris, France (1980)	Tout pour la musique (1981)	Débranche ! (1984)

Singles from Tout pour la musique
- 1. "Tout pour la musique" Released: November 1981; 2. "Amor también" Released: May 1982; 3. "Résiste" Released: September 1981

Professional ratings
Review scores
Source	Rating
Music Story	3.5/5 stars
Forces Parallèles	3/5 stars

Tout pour la musique (transl. 'All for the Music') is the eleventh studio album by French singer France Gall, released in December 1981.

== Track listing ==
No.	Title	Length
1.	"Tout pour la musique"	4:48
2.	"Les Accidents d'amour"	4:55
3.	"La Fille de Shannon"	3:52
4.	"La Prière des petits humains"	5:06
5.	"Résiste"	4:37
6.	"Amor también (Tout le monde chante)"	2:49
7.	"Vahiné"	3:38
8.	"Diego libre dans sa tête"	2:58
9.	"Ceux qui aiment"	4:24
Total length:		37:05

== Charts ==
=== Weekly charts ===
Chart (1982)	Peak position
France (SNEP)	2

=== Year-end charts ===
Chart (1982)	Peak position
France (SNEP)	7

== Certifications ==
Region	Certification	Certified units/sales
France (SNEP)	Platinum	400,000^{*}
^{*} Sales figures based on certification alone.
