= Résiste =

1981 single by France Gall

Single by France Gall

from the album Tout pour la musique
- B-side: "Tout pour la musique"
- Released: November 1981
- Recorded: 1981
- Studio: Gang Recording Studio, Paris
- Genre: Pop, chanson
- Length: 4:40
- Label: Atlantic
- Songwriter: Michel Berger
- Producer: P.E.M. Colline

France Gall singles chronology
"Les Aveux" (1980)	"Résiste" (1981)	"Amor también (Tout le monde chante)" (1982)

"Résiste" is a 1981 pop song recorded by French singer France Gall. Written by Michel Berger, it was the first single from her studio album Tout pour la musique, on which it appears as the fifth track, and was released in November 1981. In France, it achieved a cult status, becoming one of Gall's most popular songs.

== Background and lyrics ==
Initially, Berger was not satisfied with the studio album he had written for his wife Gall (album later titled Tout pour la musique) and decided, after recording, to add two new songs, "Tout pour la musique" and "Résiste". These two songs were written in the couple's house in eight days and thus resulted from the very professional character of Berger, as explained by Gall. In 1981, two different 7" were released: the first one with "Tout pour la musique" as the A-side and "Résiste" as the B-side, and the other one with the reverse. Gall said she particularly liked the song as the message it conveys has remained relevant throughout years and that it marked the memory of many people; she added that she enjoyed singing it on stage, though very tiring to perform, as the energy it required was communicative. In 1996, a new studio version of the song was recorded for the album France, on which it appears as the seventh track, and produced by Ricky Peterson and Kirk Johnson. In 2015, "Résiste" gave its title to a musical by France Gall and Bruck Dawit.

Lyrically, "Résiste", which uses many verbs in the imperative mood in the refrain, is a call to individual resistance and self-affirmation by refusing calibrated and unmeaning lives, which leads to protect one's freedom of choice. The idea is not to blame the political system, but to change the world little by little by changing one's self.

== Critical reception ==
"Résiste" received positive reviews. Nathalie Lacube of La Croix considered that "Résiste" has deeper lyrics that it seems at first view and that a whole generation in search of more solidarity and generosity found itself in these words and appropriated them. Julien Goncalves of Charts in France deemed "Résiste" is "among the most emblematic" songs recorded by Gall. Thomas Messias of Slate described it as "one of France Gall's most memorable songs" and a "sweet and universal hymn" which can be considered "feminist" and "revolutionary", and believed that it has spanned the decades and is the Gall's song which met its widest audience among French people.

== Chart performance ==
Released in 1981, "Résiste" did not chart at the time, as the official singles chart only started on 4 November 1984; however, it earned a Gold disc awarded by the Syndicat National de l'Edition Phonographique, which indicates it was a success at the time. In subsequent years, it charted on the official chart and reached number 34 on the chart edition of 13 January 2018, just after Gall's death, thus becoming her posthumously highest-charting single. At the same time, it entered the singles chart at a peak of number 93 in Switzerland.

== Cover versions and uses ==
"Résiste" was used in the 1997 film On connaît la chanson produced by Alain Resnais. At three different moments, French actress Sabine Azéma, who portrayed Odile, lipsynched part of the song's refrain (sung by Gall) to her relatives and friends to do them understand that they should be actors of their own life.

In 2013, "Résiste" was covered by Jenifer on her album Ma Déclaration; this version was released as the second single and peaked at number 85 in France where it charted for three weeks.

In March 2020, Solène Pugnet, an educational assistant in La Ravoire asked on social networks to film oneself singing "Résiste" to support nurses in their management of the coronavirus pandemic; produced in ten days, the music video posted on the Internet showed a total of 69 French anonymous singers.

== Track listings ==
- 7" single - France, Benelux
1. "Résiste" — 4:40
2. "Tout pour la musique" — 4:40
- 7" single - France, Benelux
1. "Tout pour la musique" — 4:40
2. "Résiste" — 4:40

== Charts and certifications ==
=== Weekly charts ===
Chart (2012)	Peak position
France (SNEP)	187

Chart (2015)	Peak position
France (SNEP)	136

Chart (2018)	Peak position
France (SNEP)	34
Switzerland (Schweizer Hitparade)	93

=== Certifications ===
Certifications for "Résiste"
Region	Certification	Certified units/sales
France (SNEP)	Gold	500,000^{*}
^{*} Sales figures based on certification alone.

== Release history ==
Country	Date	Format	Label
France, Benelux	1981	7" single	Atlantic
