= Annette Haas =

French pianist-concertist (1912–2002)

- Born: 1912
- Died: 2002 (aged 89–90)
- Resting place: Montmartre Cemetery
- Other names: Annette Haas-Hamburger
- Occupation: pianist-concertist
- Known for: played Mozart, Chopin and Mendelssohn
- Notable work: created "l'Aurore"
- Spouse: Jean Hamburger
- Children: Bernard Hamburger, Michel Berger

Annette Haas-Hamburger (1912–2002) was a French pianist-concertist. She was the first wife of professor Jean Hamburger (1909–1992), a member of the Académie française, as well as the mother of architect Bernard Hamburger (1940–1982) and singer-songwriter Michel Berger (1947–1992). She is buried in Montmartre Cemetery.

== Biography ==
Annette Haas is the daughter of a jeweller from Geneva of Jewish origin who composed and played the violin, and whose wife played the piano.

In her youth, she lived in an apartment above Francis Poulenc's one, who she heard playing and with whom she performed his concerto for two pianos and orchestra. A gifted student of Marguerite Long at the conservatory, she was also the soloist of the Concerts Colonne and the Concerts Pasdeloup.

She played Mozart, Chopin and Mendelssohn.

She was also the coach of singers Mady Mesplé and Jane Rhodes.

At the beginning of the 1950s, she created "l'Aurore", an association whose objective was to encourage the discovery of young talents.

Ten years later, she was at the origin of the birth of the municipal conservatory of the 17th arrondissement of Paris.
