= Bruck Dawit =

Ethiopian-American Musician and Producer

- Born: Ethiopia
- Occupation(s): Musician, record producer, record mixer, audio engineer, composer

Bruck Dawit is an Ethiopian–American musician, music producer, record mixer, composer and author.

== Musical ==
Bruck Dawit and his writing partner the singer France Gall, wrote the musical Résiste. The musical had its first representation on November 4, 2015, at the Palais des Sports auditorium in Paris, France.

== Discography ==
=== Artists and record company list ===
Los Angeles

- Michael Jackson, Michael Jackson for Sony Music
- Robert Vaughn, Sony Music
- Penny Ford, Sony Music
- Toad the Wet Sprocket, Sony Music
- Journey, Columbia Records
- Trisha Covington, Sony Music

New York

- Bruce Springsteen, Bruce Springsteen with Sony Music
- Tony Bennett, Sony Music
- Bebe & Cece Winans, Sony Music
- Rodney Crowell, Sony Music
- Prefab Sprout, Sony Music
- Tashan, Sony Music
- Shawn Colvin, Sony Music
- Sophie Hawkins, Sony Music
- Trey Lorenz, Sony Music
- The Darling Buds, Sony Music
- Brenda Kahn, Sony Music
- Darden Smith, Sony Music
- Booker T. & the M.G.'s, Sony Music
- Joe Public, Sony Music
- Queen Sarah Saturday, Sony Music
- The Blue Up?, Sony Music
- Chris Whitley, Sony Music
- Dionne Farris, Sony Music
- Janet LaValley, Sony Music
- The Candy Butchers, Sony Music
- Harry Connick Jr., Sony Music
- The presidents of the United States of America, Sony Music
- Chynna Phillips, Sony Music

United Kingdom

- Queen, EMI Records
- Martyn Joseph, Sony Music
- The Kinks, Columbia Records
- The Real People, Sony Music
- New Model Army, Sony Music
- Pauline Henry, Sony Music
- Big Audio Dynamite, Sony Music
- Marillion, EMI Records
- Prince, Paisley Park Records Warner Bros. Records
- Eric Clapton, Warner Bros. Records
- Mick Jagger, Atlantic Records
- The Rolling Stones, Atlantic Records
- France Gall, CMBM Warner Music France
- Debbie Harry & Elvis Costello Jazz Passengers
- Manic Street Preachers, Columbia Records
- Jeff Buckley, Jeff Buckley Sony Music
- David Byrne, Luaka Bop Warner Bros. Records
- Super Junky Monkey, Sony Music Japan
- The Smithereens, RCA Records
- Tevin Campbell, Prince & Kirk Johnson for Warner Bros. Records
- Color Me Badd, Giant Records
- David Wilcox, A&M Records
- Eve Gallagher, Frankie Knuckles Def Mix Productions
- Miles Jaye, Virgin Records
- Skye, Atlantic Records
- Adeva, Smack Productions
- Jody Watley, Atlantic Records
- Roxette, Capitol Records
- Robyn Springer, Cardiac Records
- Raining Violets, Daou Records
- The Screaming Jets, Universal Music U.S.
- Gontiti, Sony Music Japan
- Southern Sons, RCA Records
- Belly, Sire Records
- Regina Belle, Columbia Records
- The Judybats, Sire Records
- The Boo Radleys, Sony Music
- The Ocean Blue, Sire Records
- Paul Westerberg, Warner Bros. Records
- Matthew Sweet, Columbia Records
- Steve Perry, Sony Music
- Michael McDermot, SBK Records
- Michael Been, Qwest Records
- Andru Donalds, Capitol Records
- James McMurtry, Columbia Records
- Radionettes, Sony Music, Norway
- The Beggars, Island Records
- David Byrne & Selena, David Byrne for Atlantic Records
- Toshi Kubota & Caron Wheeler, Sony Music, Japan
- Robben Ford, GRP Records
- The Greenberry Woods, Sire Records
- The Fledglings, TVT Records
- Skydiggers, Sony Music, Canada
- Christine Anu, Sony Music, Australia
- Amanda Marshall, Sony Music, Canada

=== Remix ===
- 1991: Michael Jackson, In The Closet (Remix), Sony Music
- 1992: Darling Buds, Long Day in the Universe (Remix), Chaos Recordings, Columbia Records
- 1995: Shawn Colvin, Every Little Thing He Does Is Magic (Remix), Columbia Records
- 1997: France Gall, Résiste (Remix), CMBM Warner Music France
- 2002: Michel Berger, La Fille Au Sax, Pour Me Comprendre, CMBM Warner Music France
- 2004: France Gall, Privée D'Amour (Remix), Evidemment, CMBM Warner Music France

=== Performance, Remix, Production and Technical ===
- 1991: Brinca (12") Biscayne Europa (BE)
- 1992: Working Mother, Epic Records
- 1992: Stars And Stripes, Generation Terrorists US Mix, Epic/Sony
- 1993: Live at Sin-é, Columbia
- 1993: Feed The Tree/Star, Sire, Reprise Records
- 1993: There She Goes, So I Married An Axe Murderer, Chaos Recordings
- 1993: For The Sake of Love, Columbia, Columbia, Chaos Recordings
- 1993: I'm Ready, Qwest Records, Warner Bros. Records
- 1993: Contemporary Jeep Music, Rowdy Records
- 1993: Being There, Epic
- 1994: Wild Seed, Wild Flower, Columbia,
- 1994: Call Me, Columbia
- 1994: Why You Wanna Play Me Out? (MHB Mix), Trisha Covington, Columbia
- 1994: MTV Unplugged, Columbia, Columbia
- 1994: David Byrne, Luaka Bop, Sire, Warner Bros. Records
- 1995: Spool Forka Dish, Columbia
- 1995: Don Juan DeMarco, David Byrne, Warner Bros. Records, Film Music
- 1995: Amanda Marshall, Epic
- 1996: Secret Garden, Bruce Springsteen, Jerry Maguire Film Music
- 1996: France, CMBM Warner Music France
- 1996: Privée D'amour, CMBM Warner Music France
- 1996: France Gall, Plus Haut, CMBM Warner Music France
- 1997: France Gall, France Gall, Concert Privé/Concert Public, CMBM Warner Music France
- 2002: Michel Berger, Lumière Du Jour, CMBM Warner Music France
- 2004: France Gall, Évidemment, CMBM Warner Music France
- 2005: France Gall, Pleyel, CMBM Warner Music France
- 2006: Tony Bennett, MTV Unplugged, Sony BMG
- 2012: Double Jeu En Studio Le Making Of, Berger/Gall, Double Jeu, WEA Music
- 2013: Message Personnel (Show TV) Françoise Hardy, CMBM Warner Music France
- Unknown: Martyn Joseph, Being There, Epic
