= Simple je – Débranchée à Bercy =

Live album by France Gall
- Released: October 29, 1993
- Recorded: 1993, Paris
- Genre: Chanson; Rock
- Length: 55:32
- Label: Warner Music
- Producer: France Gall; The MB School

France Gall chronology
Double Jeu (1992)	Simple je – Débranchée à Bercy (1993)	Simple je – Rebranchée à Bercy (1994)

Professional ratings
Review scores
Source	Rating
AllMusic	3/5 stars

Simple je – Débranchée à Bercy is a live album by French singer France Gall, released in October 1993.

== Track listing ==
All tracks are written by Michel Berger.

No.	Title	Length
1.	"Débranche"	8:17
2.	"La Déclaration d'amour"	5:29
3.	"Quelques mots d'amour"	4:11
4.	"Chanter pour ceux qui sont loin de chez eux"	4:15
5.	"Si maman si"	5:25
6.	"C'est difficile d'être un homme aussi"	2:59
7.	"J'ai besoin de vous"	3:36
8.	"Il jouait du piano debout"	4:38
9.	"La Minute de silence"	4:43
10.	"Tout pour la musique"	3:41
11.	"Mademoiselle Chang"	8:18

== Certifications ==
Region	Certification	Certified units/sales
France (SNEP)	2× Gold	200,000^{*}
^{*} Sales figures based on certification alone.
