= Paris, France (album) =

Studio album by France Gall
- Released: 19 May 1980
- Studio: WEA
- Genre: Chanson
- Length: 32:15
- Producer: Michel Berger

France Gall chronology
Dancing Disco (1977)	Paris, France (1980)	Tout pour la musique (1981)

Singles from Paris, France
- 1. "Il jouait du piano debout" Released: June 1980; 2. "Bébé comme la vie" Released: October 1980

Professional ratings
Review scores
Source	Rating
Forces Parallèles	5/5 stars

Paris, France is the tenth studio album by France Gall, released in May 1980.

== Track listing ==
All tracks are written by Michel Berger.

Side one
No.	Title	Length
1.	"Il jouait du piano debout"	4:36
2.	"La chanteuse qui a tout donné"	2:46
3.	"Trop grand pour moi"	3:11
4.	"Plus d'été"	3:07
5.	"Les moments où j'aime tout le monde"	1:37

Side two
No.	Title	Length
1.	"Bébé comme la vie"	3:19
2.	"La Mort douce"	3:28
3.	"Parler, parler"	2:55
4.	"Plus haut"	2:50
5.	"Ma vieille Europe"	4:26
Total length:		32:15

== Certifications ==
Region	Certification	Certified units/sales
France (SNEP)	Platinum	300,000^{*}
^{*} Sales figures based on certification alone.
