= Babacar (song) =

1987 single by France Gall

Single by France Gall

from the album Babacar
- B-side: "C'est bon que tu sois là"
- Released: 3 April 1987
- Recorded: 1986
- Genre: Pop
- Length: 4:42
- Label: WEA
- Songwriter: Michel Berger
- Producer: Michel Berger

France Gall singles chronology
"Calypso" (1985)	"Babacar" (1987)	"Ella, elle l'a" (1987)

"Babacar" is a 1987 song recorded by French singer France Gall. Written by Michel Berger, it was the first single from the album of the same name. Released on 3 April 1987, it reached the top 20 in France and West Germany.

== Background and writing ==
During vacations in Senegal in 1986, Gall met a baby, Babacar Sall, and his young mother named Fatou who raised him alone and without money, so that the latter proposed Gall to take him and raise him instead of her. Shocked, Gall photographed the child and, when back in France, spoke about it to husband Berger. They decided not to adopt the child but to help the young mother financially and materially. This story and Gall's distress led Berger to write the song "Babacar". In January 1987, they went to Dakar again to shoot the music video for the song and saw Fatou and her child again. After finding an apartment for them, the couple financed the young woman's seamstress studies as well as her son's future, whom they met again in 1992.

== Track listings ==
- 7-inch single
1. "Babacar" – 4:42
2. "C'est bon que tu sois là" – 3:39

== Charts ==
1987 weekly chart performance for "Babacar"
Chart (1987)	Peak position
Europe (European Hot 100)	28
Europe (European Airplay Top 50)	26
France (SNEP)	11
Switzerland (Schweizer Hitparade)	27

1988 weekly chart performance for "Babacar"
Chart (1988)	Peak position
Europe (European Hot 100)	69
Europe (European Airplay Top 50)	41
West Germany (Media Control Charts)	14

== Kate Ryan version ==
"Babacar"

Single by Kate Ryan

from the album French Connection
- B-side: "Remix"
- Released: 12 June 2009 (Belgium); 15 June 2009 (Europe); 30 October (Germany)
- Recorded: 2009
- Genre: Dance-pop; Europop
- Length: 3:13
- Label: ARS/Universal
- Songwriter: Michel Berger
- Producer: 2N

Kate Ryan singles chronology
"Your Eyes" (2009)	"Babacar" (2009)	"Évidemment" (2009)

Music video
- "Babacar" on YouTube

It was announced by Kate Ryan in early 2009 that her new single would be a French track and a cover. Later on, at the end of May, the single cover was released and it was confirmed that it would be another France Gall cover. Ryan performed and presented the single for the first time in her gig at G-A-Y in London, United Kingdom. Later, a preview of the official video was onlineone week before the Belgian release of the single. The song debuted first in Sweden at No. 27, debuting one week after in Belgium at No. 22. The song was already released in Poland and the Czech Republic and a German release was set for 30 October 2009.

=== Track listings ===
CD single

1. "Babacar" (radio edit) — 3.11
2. "Babacar" (extended mix) — 5.18

CD maxi

1. "Babacar" (radio edit) – 3:21
2. "Babacar" (extended) – 5:21
3. "Babacar" (basto! remix) – 6:33
4. "Babacar" (XTM remix) – 6:34

=== Charts ===
Chart (2009)	Peak position
Austria (Ö3 Austria Top 40)	53
Belgium (Ultratop Flanders)	17
CIS Airplay (TopHit)	86
Swedish (Sverigetopplistan)	27
Spain (PROMUSICAE)	21
Poland (Airplay Top 100)	92
Germany (Official German Charts)	28

== Other cover versions ==
In 2009, the song was covered by Lara Fabian on her eighth studio album Toutes les femmes en moi, as 14th track.
