= Essential (Kate Ryan album) =

Compilation album by Kate Ryan
- Released: June 2008 (Belgium)
- Recorded: 2001–2008
- Genre: Trance, Eurodance, house
- Label: EMI/Capitol Records

Kate Ryan chronology
Free (2008)	Essential (2008)	French Connection (2009)

Essential is the first compilation released by Kate Ryan. The album was released by the labels EMI and Capitol in early June 2008.

== Track listing ==
1. Désenchantée
2. Je t'adore
3. Alive [French Version]
4. All For You
5. Libertine
6. Only If I
7. The Promise You Made
8. Mon coeur résiste encore
9. UR (My Love)
10. Je lance un appel
11. The Rain
12. Goodbye
13. Alive
14. Scream for More
15. Voyage Voyage
16. Ella, elle l' a

== Charts ==
Chart	Peak position
Belgium Albums Chart	88
