= Babacar (France Gall album) =

Studio album by France Gall
- Released: 3 April 1987
- Recorded: 1986
- Studios: Lark Recording Studios, Carimate; Studio Gang, Paris
- Genre: Pop
- Length: 35:15
- Labels: WEA, Apache Records
- Producer: Michel Berger

France Gall chronology
| Débranche ! (1984) | Babacar (1987) | Double jeu (1992) |

Professional ratings
Review scores
| Source | Rating |
|---|---|
| Forces Parallèles | 3/5 stars |

Babacar is the thirteenth studio album by France Gall with music and lyrics by Michel Berger. It is certified Diamond. It includes the track "La Chanson d'Azima", inspired by a visit to Mali, which focuses on environmental issues.

== Track listing ==
All tracks composed by Michel Berger

| No. | Title | Length |
|---|---|---|
| 1. | "Papillon de nuit" | 4:58 |
| 2. | "Dancing Brave" | 3:08 |
| 3. | "Babacar" | 4:49 |
| 4. | "J'irai où tu iras" | 3:51 |
| 5. | "Ella, elle l'a" | 4:51 |
| 6. | "Évidemment" | 3:27 |
| 7. | "La Chanson d'Azima" | 2:47 |
| 8. | "Urgent d'attendre" | 3:44 |
| 9. | "C'est bon que tu sois là" | 3:40 |

== Charts ==
| Chart (1987) | Peak position |
|---|---|
| France | 2 |
| Sweden | 24 |
| Switzerland | 25 |

=== Certifications and sales ===
| Region | Certification | Certified units/sales |
|---|---|---|
| France (SNEP) | Diamond | 1,000,000^{*} |
^{*} Sales figures based on certification alone.
