= Philippe Cataldo =

French singer and composer

- Born: Philippe Cataldo; August 24, 1954 (age 71)
- Origin: France
- Genres: Pop
- Occupation(s): Singer, composer
- Years active: 1983–1989
- Labels: Polydor

Philippe Cataldo (born August 24, 1954 in Bône in French Algeria) is a French singer and composer. He is best known for his 1986 hit single "Les Divas du dancing", which deals with the suave swingers of tropical nights and which reached number 8 in the French charts that year. Cataldo himself composed the music for the song, but the lyrics were by musician and translator Jean Schultheis.

Cataldo returned to the stage briefly for a concert tour called RFM Party 80, which celebrated the hits and artists of the eighties.

== Singles ==
- 1983: "J'aurai l'air de quoi"
- 1984: "Laisse-là"
- 1986: "Les Divas du dancing" – No. 8 in France, Silver disc
- 1989: "Ne t'en fais pas"
