= Cinq minutes d'amour =

Compilation album by France Gall
- Released: 1976
- Label: Music for Pleasure (EMI)

France Gall chronology
Les Grands succès de France Gall (1975)	Cinq minutes d'amour (1976)	France Gall (1976)

Singles from Cinq minutes d'amour
- 1. "Frankenstein" Released: May 1972; 2. "Cinq minutes d'amour" Released: June 1972; 3. "Par plaisir" Released: June 1973

France Gall, commonly known as Cinq minutes d'amour after its opening track, is a budget album by French singer France Gall. Released in 1976, it is a compilation of three 7-inch records previously released on the EMI label in 1972 and 1973, complemented by two new tracks and two Italian-language adaptations.

== Background ==
The album features the singles "Frankenstein", "Cinq minutes d'amour", and "Par plaisir", together with their respective B-sides. It also includes Italian-language versions of two of its tracks, and two previously unreleased titles, "C'est curieux de vieillir" and "Le Lâche". The release appeared on EMI's budget imprint, Music for Pleasure.

While "C'est curieux de vieillir", backed with "Le Lâche", was scheduled for release as a single in late 1973, the record was withdrawn on Michel Berger's advice to make way for "La Déclaration d'amour". Cinq minutes d'amour remains the only commercial release to include these two songs.

== Track listing ==
Side A
No.	Title	Lyrics	Music	Length
1.	"Cinq minutes d'amour"	Jean-Michel Rivat, Frank Thomas	Roland Vincent	3:01
2.	"Frankenstein"	Serge Gainsbourg	Serge Gainsbourg	2:37
3.	"Le quatro domande" ("La Quatrième chose")	Herbert Pagani	Roland Vincent	2:34
4.	"C'est curieux de vieillir"	Jean-Michel Rivat	Bernard Liamis	2:44
5.	"Plus haut que moi" ("Maria vai com as outras")	Yves Dessca, Jean-Michel Rivat	Toquinho	2:26

Side B
No.	Title	Lyrics	Music	Length
1.	"Par plaisir"	Yves Dessca, Jean-Michel Rivat	Roland Vincent	2:27
2.	"Les Petits ballons"	Serge Gainsbourg	Jean-Claude Vannier	2:46
3.	"Le Lâche"	Jean-Michel Rivat, Michel Delpech	Roland Vincent	3:00
4.	"La Quatrième chose"	Jean-Michel Rivat, Frank Thomas	Roland Vincent	2:34
5.	"Sole mare cielo amor" ("Cinq minutes d'amour")	Herbert Pagani	Roland Vincent	3:01
