= Débranche! =

Studio album by France Gall
- Released: 2 April 1984
- Studio: Conway Studios, Los Angeles, US; Studio du Palais des Congrès, Paris, France; Studio Gang, Paris, France
- Genre: Chanson
- Length: 36:48
- Label: Apache; WEA
- Producer: Michel Berger

France Gall chronology
Tout pour la musique (1981)	Débranche! (1984)	Babacar (1987)

Singles from Débranche!
- 1. "Débranche!" Released: April 1984; 2. "Hong-Kong Star" Released: September 1984; 3. "Calypso" Released: February 1985; 4. "Cézanne peint" Released: May 1985

Professional ratings
Review scores
Source	Rating
Music Story	4/5 stars
Forces Parallèles	2/5 stars

Débranche! is the twelfth studio album by French singer France Gall, released in April 1984.

== Track listing ==
All tracks are written by Michel Berger.

No.	Title	Length
1.	"Débranche!"	4:11
2.	"Calypso"	3:34
3.	"Tu comprendras quand tu seras plus jeune"	3:49
4.	"Hong-Kong Star"	4:16
5.	"Cézanne peint"	4:04
6.	"Savoir vivre"	5:06
7.	"Si superficielle"	3:32
8.	"Annie donne"	4:33
9.	"J'ai besoin de vous"	3:43
Total length:		36:48

== Charts and certifications ==
=== Weekly charts ===
Chart (1984)	Peak position
France (SNEP)	1

=== Year-end charts ===
Chart (1984)	Peak position
France (SNEP)	4

=== Certifications ===
Region	Certification	Certified units/sales
France (SNEP)	2× Platinum	600,000^{*}
^{*} Sales figures based on certification alone.
