= Ella, elle l'a =

1987 single by France Gall

Single by France Gall

from the album Babacar
- B-side: "Dancing Brave"
- Released: 24 August 1987
- Recorded: 1987
- Studio: Studio Gang, Paris
- Genre: Pop, synth-pop
- Length: 4:51
- Label: WEA
- Songwriter: Michel Berger
- Producer: Michel Berger

France Gall singles chronology
"Babacar" (1987)	"Ella, elle l'a" (1987)	"Évidemment" (1988)

Music video
- "Ella, elle l'a" on YouTube

"Ella, elle l'a" (French for "Ella Has It") is a single released by the French singer France Gall. It was released as a single from her album Babacar, on 24 August 1987, and became a hit across Europe, the Americas (especially in Quebec and the Southern Cone) and Asia (especially in Japan). It was covered by the Belgian singer Kate Ryan in a dance version in 2008.

== Background ==
Written by Michel Berger, the song is a tribute to Ella Fitzgerald, but also a protest against racism and an anthem to personal empowerment. Musically, "it swings between sheared rhythms of the bass and flashed brass". The song is also available on the CD maxi for "Évidemment", released in March 1988. In addition, a live version from her concert album Le Tour de France was released in November of that year.

== Critical reception ==
"Ella, elle l'a" won two Victoires de la Musique in 1987 and in 1988. A 1987 review in Pan-European magazine Music & Media elected "Ella, elle l'a" single of the week and stated: "This moody and balanced, slowly rocking track, written by Michel Berger, deserves to be her next success outside France".

== Chart performance ==
"Ella, elle l'a" enjoyed great success in 1987 and 1988, reaching number-one in Austria and Germany in the latter year; in addition, it reached the top ten in Denmark, Sweden, Spain and Argentina. In France, it was certified as silver disc by the Syndicat National de l'Édition Phonographique, reached number two and charted for a total of 19 weeks, nine of them in the top ten.

== Track listings ==
- 7" single
1. "Ella, elle l'a" (4:49)
2. "Dancing Brave" (3:06)
- 12" maxi
1. "Ella, elle l'a"
2. "Papillon de nuit"
3. "Dancing Brave"

== Charts ==
=== Weekly charts ===
1987–1988 weekly chart performance for "Ella, elle l'a"
Chart (1987–1988)	Peak position
Austria (Ö3 Austria Top 40)	1
Denmark (IFPI)	2
Europe (European Hot 100)	6
Europe (European Airplay Top 50)	9
Finland (Suomen virallinen lista)	19
France (SNEP)	2
Netherlands (Single Top 100)	38
Quebec (ADISQ)	1
Sweden (Sverigetopplistan)	4
Switzerland (Schweizer Hitparade)	5
West Germany (GfK)	1

2012 weekly chart performance for "Ella, elle l'a"
Chart (2012)	Peak position
France (SNEP)	130

2013 weekly chart performance for "Ella, elle l'a"
Chart (2013)	Peak position
France (SNEP)	184

2018 weekly chart performance for "Ella, elle l'a"
Chart (2018)	Peak position
Switzerland (Schweizer Hitparade)	27

=== Year-end charts ===
Year-end chart performance for "Ella, elle l'a"
Chart (1988)	Position
Austria (Ö3 Austria Top 40)	19
Europe (European Hot 100)	32
Europe (European Airplay Top 50)	23
Switzerland (Schweizer Hitparade)	17
West Germany (Media Control)	5

== Certifications ==
Certifications for "Ella, elle l'a"
Region	Certification	Certified units/sales
France (SNEP)	Silver	250,000^{*}
Germany (BVMI)	Gold	250,000^{^}
^{*} Sales figures based on certification alone.^{^} Shipments figures based on certification alone.

== Kate Ryan version ==
"Ella, elle l'a"

Single by Kate Ryan

from the album Free
- B-side: "Ella, elle l'a" (extended version); "L.I.L.Y."
- Released: 25 April 2008; 25 May 2009 (UK)
- Genre: Europop; Dance-pop
- Length: 3:05
- Label: ARS/Universal
- Songwriter: Michel Berger
- Producer: 2N

Kate Ryan singles chronology
"L.I.L.Y. (Like I Love You)" (2008)	"Ella, elle l'a" (2008)	"I Surrender" (2008)

Music video
- "Ella, elle l'a" on YouTube

Kate Ryan's version of "Ella, elle l'a" is the third single of her album Free. It was released on 6 May 2008 in Belgium and on 9 May 2008 in the rest of Europe as a CD single. It had already topped number one on the Spanish Download Chart, and number seven on the Belgian Singles Chart. It also reached the top ten in Germany. It had entered the Swedish Singles Chart at number twelve, peaking at number two. In the Netherlands, "Ella, elle l'a" also peaked at number two.

English version "Ella, elle l'a" was sung live by Ryan during her 2008 UK tour and it was released on 25 May 2009 as first single from the UK version of Free.

=== Track listing ===
German CD single

1. "Ella, elle l'a" (radio version) - 3:06
2. "Ella, elle l'a" (extended version) - 6:07
3. "L.I.L.Y." (radio edit) - 3:15

Belgian CD single

1. "Ella, elle l'a" (radio version) - 3:06
2. "Ella, elle l'a" (extended version) - 6:07

European 12" single

1. "Ella, elle l'a" (extended version) - 6:07
2. "Ella, elle l'a" (Bodybangers remix) - 6:05
3. "Ella, elle l'a" (club remix) - 4:50

=== Official versions ===
- Extended version - 6:08
- Bodybangers remix - 6:05
- Club remix - 4:50
- Club remix short - 3:12
- Fugitive's Elle La Tout Remix
- Jorg Schmid Remix

=== Charts ===
==== Weekly charts ====
Weekly chart performance for "Ella, elle l'a" by Kate Ryan
Chart (2008)	Peak position
Austria (Ö3 Austria Top 40)	23
Belgium (Ultratop 50 Flanders)	7
Belgium (Ultratop 50 Wallonia)	34
Canada (Canadian Hot 100)	63
CIS Airplay (TopHit)	20
Czech Republic Airplay (ČNS IFPI)	28
Denmark (Tracklisten)	29
Europe (European Hot 100)	27
Germany (GfK)	10
Hungary (Rádiós Top 40)	3
Netherlands (Dutch Top 40)	2
Netherlands (Single Top 100)	5
Norway (VG-lista)	9
Poland (Polish Airplay Charts)	2
Russia Airplay (TopHit)	23
Spain (Promusicae)	2
Sweden (Sverigetopplistan)	2
Switzerland (Schweizer Hitparade)	50

==== Year-end charts ====
Year-end chart performance for "Ella, elle l'a" by Kate Ryan
Chart (2008)	Position
Belgium (Ultratop 50 Flanders)	38
CIS (TopHit)	76
Hungary (Rádiós Top 40)	45
Netherlands (Dutch Top 40)	20
Netherlands (Single Top 100)	22
Russia Airplay (TopHit)	94
Spain (PROMUSICAE)	2
Sweden (Sverigetopplistan)	14

=== Certifications ===
Region	Certification	Certified units/sales
Spain (Promusicae)	5× Platinum	100,000^{*}
Spain (Promusicae) Ringtone	5× Platinum	100,000^{*}
Sweden (GLF)	Platinum	20,000^{^}
^{*} Sales figures based on certification alone.^{^} Shipments figures based on certification alone.
