= Évidemment (France Gall song) =

1987 song by France Gall

Single by France Gall

from the album Babacar
- B-side: "La Chanson d'Azima"; "Ella, elle l'a" (CD maxi)
- Released: 7 March 1988
- Recorded: France, 1987
- Genre: Pop
- Length: 3:26
- Label: Apache, WEA
- Songwriter: Michel Berger
- Producer: Michel Berger

France Gall singles chronology
"Ella, elle l'a" (1987)	"Évidemment" (1988)	"Papillon de nuit" (1988)

"Évidemment" (French pronunciation: [evidamɑ̃]; transl. "Evidently") is a 1987 pop song recorded by French singer France Gall. It was the third single from her album Babacar and was released on 7 March 1988. In France, the song achieved success, becoming Gall's third top ten hit.

== Background ==
Written by Gall's husband Michel Berger, the song is a tribute to Daniel Balavoine who was a close friend of the couple and who died about two years earlier. The B-side of the vinyl, "La Chanson d'Azima", became the fifth and last single from the album and was released in April 1989. "Évidemment" was included on the singer's albums Live, le tour de France (live released in 1988), Les Années Musique (best of, 1990), Live à Bercy (live, 1993) France in a 4:30 acoustic version (1996), Concert Privé M6 (live, 1997) and Évidemment (double best of, 2004). In a 2004 interview Gall said: ""Évidemment" is my saddest song, my song of absence. (...) 'Évidemment / on rit encore / mais pas comme avant' (...) [which can mean] 'I'm here (...) but it's not like before'. It's true."

== Chart performance ==
"Évidemment" was a successful single in France: it started at number 19 on the chart edition of 2 April 1988, then climbed almost every week and eventually peaked at number six in its tenth week; it totalled 16 weeks in the top 50, seven of them in the top ten. It became the second most successful single from the album in terms of chart positions and the third one in terms of sales. On the European Hot 100 Singles, it started at number 55 on 16 April 1988, reached a peak of number 24 nine weeks later, and fell off the chart after 15 weeks of presence. It also charted for six weeks on the European Airplay Top 50, with a peak at number 23 in its third week.

== Cover versions ==
The song was covered by many artists, including Maurane, Lara Fabian, Patrick Fiori and Pascal Obispo on the 2001 album L'Odyssée des Enfoirés, Emma Daumas, Houcine, Aurélie Konaté, Nolwenn Leroy and Anne-Laure Sibon (five contestants of the French Star Academy 2) on the 2002 album Star Academy chante Michel Berger, and Mimmy Mathy and Jean-Baptiste Maunier on the 2005 album Le Train des Enfoirés. The song was also covered by Julie Pietri on her 2007 album Autour de minuit.

== Track listings ==
- 7" single
1. "Évidemment" – 3:26
2. "La Chanson d'Azima" – 2:45
- CD maxi
1. "Évidemment"
2. "Ella, elle l'a"
3. "La Chanson d'Azima"

== Credits ==
- Music: Michel Berger
- Lyrics: Michel Berger
- Vocals: France Gall
- Recorded by Jean-Pierre Janiaud
- Assisted by Olivier do Espirito Santo
- Recorded at Studios Gang, in Paris.

== Charts ==
1988–1989 weekly chart performance for "Évidemment"
Chart (1988–1989)	Peak position
Belgium (Ultratop 50 Wallonia)	10 (Note: The exact peak position in Belgium (Wallonia) is unknown. The single reached at least number 10, as Music & Media provided the single's ranking only for that week, but it did not reach the top three, given every week by the magazine.)
Europe (European Airplay Top 50)	23
Europe (European Hot 100)	24
France (SNEP)	6
Quebec (ADISQ)	33

2012 weekly chart performance for "Évidemment"
Chart (2012)	Peak position
France (SNEP)	112

2018 weekly chart performance for "Évidemment"
Chart (2018)	Peak position
France (SNEP)	77
Switzerland (Schweizer Hitparade)	89

== Kate Ryan version ==
"Évidemment"

Single by Kate Ryan

from the album French Connection
- B-side: "2N Remix"
- Released: 9 October 2009 (Belgium)
- Recorded: 2009
- Genre: Pop (main version): Europop; dance-pop; (2N Remix)
- Length: 3:08 (main version); 3:18 (2N Remix)
- Label: ARS/Universal
- Songwriter: Michel Berger
- Producers: Yves Gaillard (main version); Niclas Kings, Niklas Bergwall (2N Remix)

Kate Ryan singles chronology
"Babacar" (2009)	"Évidemment" (2009)	"Lovelife" (2011)

Music video
- "Évidemment" on YouTube

Some weeks before the release of French Connection, Kate Ryan's greatest hits album, it was announced that the next single to "Babacar" would be her cover version of the song. It was released on 9 October 2009. It has two versions: the main version, produced by Yves Gaillard, is a pop ballad with piano and voice, and the 2N Remix, produced by Niclas Kings and Niklas Bergwall (2N), is dance version.

=== Track listings ===
- CD single
1. "Évidemment" — 3.10
2. "Évidemment" (2N remix) — 3.18

=== Charts ===
Chart (2009)	Peak position
Belgian (Flanders) Singles Chart	27
