= Il jouait du piano debout =

1980 single by France Gall

Single by France Gall

from the album Paris, France
- B-side: "La Chanteuse qui a tout donné"
- Released: June 1980
- Length: 4:30
- Label: Atlantic Records
- Songwriter: Michel Berger
- Producer: Michel Berger

France Gall singles chronology
"Besoin d'amour" (1978)	"Il jouait du piano debout" (1980)	"Bébé comme la vie" (1980)

"Il jouait du piano debout" (transl. "He played the piano standing") is a song by French singer France Gall from her tenth studio album Paris, France. Written and produced by Michel Berger, it was released as the album's lead single in June 1980 by Atlantic Records. The single was a major commercial success. It reached number one on the French singles chart and became one of Gall's best-selling releases, with over 800,000 copies sold.

== Composition and lyrics ==
The song is structured around a pop-rock arrangement with a strong rhythmic drive and a prominent piano line. Its lyrics celebrate individuality and nonconformity through the portrait of a musician who plays the piano standing up – a gesture which, to the singer, symbolises his freedom, authenticity and resistance to social norms.

Although the lyrics never explicitly name the pianist, the song was widely understood as a tribute to British singer and pianist Elton John, possibly referencing his 1979 concerts in the Soviet Union. This theory was supported by claims that John allegedly agreed to collaborate with Gall on the 1981 duets "Les Aveux" and "Donner pour donner" because he felt flattered at being the subject of her recent hit. Michel Berger and France Gall later dismissed this interpretation, explaining in interviews that the song's true inspiration had been American rock pianist Jerry Lee Lewis, whose fiery, unconventional performance style had left a strong impression on Berger.

== Track listing ==
7-inch single

1. "Il jouait du piano debout" – 4:30
2. "La Chanteuse qui a tout donné" – 2:40

== Charts ==
=== Weekly charts ===
Chart (1980)	Peak position
France	1
Netherlands (Dutch Top 40)	22
Netherlands (Single Top 100)	26

Chart (2018)	Peak position
France (SNEP)	57
Switzerland (Schweizer Hitparade)	77

=== Year-end charts ===
Chart (1980)	Position
France	6

== Notable covers ==
- In 1981, a Japanese-language cover of the song, titled "Gin no Yubiwa" (銀の指輪), was released by Yumi Seino.
- In 1991, a Spanish-language cover of the song, titled "Justo en el momento", was released by Sasha Sokol.
