= Laisse tomber les filles =

Song composed by Serge Gainsbourg and performed by France Gall

- Cover of the EP Laisse tomber les filles

Song by France Gall

from the EP Laisse tomber les filles
- A-side: "Laisse tomber les filles" "Le Premier chagrin d'amour"
- B-side: "Christiansen" "On t'avait prévenue"
- Released: 1964
- Length: 2:15
- Label: Philips
- Songwriter: Serge Gainsbourg

"Laisse tomber les filles" (transl. "Drop it with the girls") is a French song written by Serge Gainsbourg and originally performed by France Gall in 1964. The song was a major hit in France, peaking at number 4 according to Billboard magazine.

== Lyrics ==
The message of the song can be summed up as "you'll get yours". A girl whose heart has been broken addresses the boy who has done the heart-breaking, warning him that if he doesn't "leave the girls alone", he'll end up heart-broken himself. The contrast between the dark tone of this song and the more upbeat mood of its contemporaries - the yé-yé pop style - is commented on by Gilles Verlant:

Gainsbourg's lyrics obviously have nothing to do with the worldview expressed by other teenage vocalists of the time; of course their world has its charms, but it has not a single atom of depth. In the lyrics of Gainsbourg's songs in general, and Laisse tomber les filles in particular, there is a startling lucidity coupled with a refusal to be taken in by "the great farce of love", defined in terms of "never" and "always". But, with Laisse tomber les filles, we are not presented with a male narrator of thirty or thirty-five years, but rather a teenager.

France Gall's vindictive lyrics are supported by the well-known jazz band led by Gogo (the same group with whom Gainsbourg was recording at the time). The song's emphasis on brass and percussion is regarded as being integral to its success.

== Charts ==
Weekly chart performance for “Laisse tomber les filles”
Chart (1964–65)	Peak position
Belgium (Ultratop 50 Wallonia)	9

== Cover versions ==
The song was covered by the French singer Mareva Galanter in an explicit reference to the yé-yé style. It is covered by Fabienne Delsol on her first solo album, No Time For Sorrows (2004). The San Francisco-based yé-yé revival band, Rue '66, covered it for their debut in 2011. Californian trio No Small Children recorded a version in 2018, which was used during the closing credits of the film A Simple Favor. Nashville-based singer Adia Victoria included a cover on her 2017 EP How it Feels.

April March recorded two covers of the song in 1995: one with the original French lyrics, and the other as "Chick Habit" with English lyrics written by March. "Chick Habit" is played during the opening credits of the 1999 campy teen comedy But I'm a Cheerleader directed by Jamie Babbit. Both versions of the song, first English and then French, are played over images of China Girls during the end credits of the movie Death Proof (2007) by Quentin Tarantino. It was also used as the backing music to television advertisements for the Renault Twingo in the UK and in France in 2008. European (based in Switzerland) rockabilly band Hillbilly Moon Explosion performs cover version of the song. They also released an album together with French singer and actress Arielle Dombasle where the song is performed by Dombasle with back vocals by the band vocalist Emanuela Huter.

Experimental Belgian rock band The Honeymoon Killers recorded a cover for their 1982 album Les tueurs de la lune de miel, performed in French by the band's female vocalist Véronique Vincent.

There was a cover performed by Marjorie Condoris, Stéphanie D'Alma, Amina El Bennouni, Sofia Essaïdi, Elodie Frégé, and Morganne Matis when they were contestants on Star Academy during season 3 (2002). It was released as the 14th track on the show's tie-in album Star Academy III: Fait sa Bamba (Mercury France 2003).

American electronica musician Benn Jordan recorded a cover of the 1995 English version of the song for his album Flexing Habitual under the name The Flashbulb in 2006.

As part of the AGBO Fantasy Football Trash Talk, actress Pom Klementieff sang a parody of the song called "Au Revoir Chris Hemsworth". Mission: Impossible – Dead Reckoning Part One co-star Simon Pegg co-wrote the parody song with Klementieff and directed the video. Tom Cruise and Rebecca Ferguson made guest appearances, alongside Pegg, in the video as well.

American surf rock band Black Valley Moon (a side project of Down by Law) recorded a cover of the song in a surf-rock style for their EP "Vampirella" (2020).

Moldovan-Romanian singer and songwriter Irina Rimes released a cover of the song as a non-album single in 2022.

== Samples and other appearances ==
Elements of the song are interpolated in "Montreal" from the Weeknd's third mixtape, Echoes of Silence. When the song was released as part of the Weeknd's Trilogy, France Gall was given sole credit for writing "Laisse tomber les filles".

The song was used under the end credits of the 2018 Paul Feig film A Simple Favor.

An excerpt of Fabienne Delsol's 2004 cover version was used for the final shot of Season 2, Episode 2 of the TV series Funny Woman, airing in 2024.
