= Dancing Disco =

Studio album by France Gall
- Released: 27 April 1977
- Recorded: London, United Kingdom; Paris, France
- Studio: Berwick Street Studios; Studio Gang
- Genre: Chanson, pop, rock
- Length: 29:49
- Label: WEA
- Producer: Michel Berger

France Gall chronology
France Gall (1976)	Dancing Disco (1977)	Paris, France (1980)

Singles from Dancing Disco
- 1. "Musique" Released: May 1977; 2. "Si, maman, si" Released: October 1977; 3. "Le meilleur de soi-même" Released: January 1978

Professional ratings
Review scores
Source	Rating
AllMusic	2/5 stars
Forces Parallèles	2/5 stars

Dancing Disco is the ninth studio album by French singer France Gall, released in April 1977. It was conceived as a concept album.

== Track listing ==
All tracks composed by Michel Berger

No.	Title	Length
1.	"Dancing Disco"	6:45
2.	"Chanson de Maggie"	3:05
3.	"Une nuit à Paris"	2:10
4.	"Quand on est enfant"	1:45
5.	"Musique"	5:20
6.	"Le Meilleur de soi-même"	3:50
7.	"Ce garçon qui danse"	4:05
8.	"Si maman si"	2:55
Total length:		29:49

== Certifications ==
Region	Certification	Certified units/sales
France (SNEP)	Platinum	300,000^{*}
^{*} Sales figures based on certification alone.
