= France Gall (1976 album) =

Studio album by France Gall

Studio album by France Gall
- Released: 16 December 1975 (cassette); 6 January 1976 (LP)
- Recorded: 1974–1975
- Studio: Studio Gang, Paris; Studio Condorcet, Toulouse
- Genre: Chanson
- Length: 37:32
- Label: WEA
- Producer: Michel Berger

France Gall chronology
1968 (1968)	France Gall (1976)	Dancing Disco (1977)

Singles from France Gall
- 1. "La Déclaration d'amour" Released: May 1974; 2. "Comment lui dire" Released: January 1976; 3. "Ce soir je ne dors pas" Released: April 1976

Professional ratings
Review scores
Source	Rating
Forces Parallèles	4/5 stars

France Gall is the eighth studio album by French singer France Gall. It was her first album produced by Michel Berger.

First released on audio cassette on 16 December 1975, then on vinyl record on 6 January 1976, this album was certified Gold for over 100,000 copies sold in France.

== Track listing ==
No.	Title	Length
1.	"Comment lui dire"	3:30
2.	"Ce soir je ne dors pas"	3:07
3.	"Comment t'en apercevoir"	1:45
4.	"La Chanson d'une terrienne (Partout je suis chez moi)"	6:07
5.	"La Déclaration d'amour"	3:28
6.	"Samba Mambo"	2:35
7.	"Big Fat Mama"	3:05
8.	"Je saurai être ton amie"	3:03
9.	"Chanson pour consoler"	1:50
10.	"Je l'aimais"	3:50
Total length:		37:32
