= Double jeu =

Studio album by Michel Berger and France Gall
- Released: 12 June 1992
- Recorded: 1991–1992
- Genre: Pop rock
- Length: 48:45
- Label: WEA, Apache Records

Michel Berger chronology
Ça ne tient pas debout (1990)	Double jeu (1992)

France Gall chronology
Le Tour de France 88 (1988)	Double jeu (1992)	Simple je – Débranchée à Bercy (1993)

Singles from Double jeu
- 1. "Laissez passer les rêves" Released: May 1992; 2. "Superficiel et léger" Released: October 1992; 3. "Les Élans du cœur" Released: January 1993

Double jeu is a studio album recorded by Michel Berger and France Gall and released on 12 June 1992, being Berger's eleventh and Gall's fourteenth respectively. Conceived as a duet project, it became the final album issued during Berger's lifetime; he died suddenly less than two months later, on 2 August 1992, at the age of 44. The record was commercially successful, selling around 550,000 copies in its first year.

== Background ==
Recorded in Paris between 1991 and 1992, the album contains ten tracks including "Laissez passer les rêves", "Superficiel et léger", and "Les Élans du cœur", all later released as singles. Several songs carry personal dedications, such as "La Petite de Calmette", written for the staff of the Calmette Hospital in Phnom Penh, and "La Lettre", dedicated to Corinne, the partner of their late friend Daniel Balavoine.

Although the couple publicly presented the project as a harmonious artistic reunion, the recording process was reportedly fraught. According to later accounts, Berger and Gall were in the midst of a separation, and the atmosphere in the studio was tense and emotionally draining. Despite these difficulties, the album was completed and premiered during a private concert at the New Morning jazz club in Paris on 22 June 1992. A live version of "Jamais partir" from that evening was later included on Gall's 1994 Simple je – L'Intégrale Bercy.

Double jeu reached number one on the French charts and went on to earn multiple certifications, including double platinum in France and gold in Switzerland.

== Track listing ==
No.	Title	Length
1.	"Laissez passer les rêves"	6:39
2.	"Bats-toi"	5:17
3.	"Superficiel et léger"	5:44
4.	"La Petite de Calmette"	4:20
5.	"Toi sinon personne"	4:49
6.	"La Lettre"	3:55
7.	"La Chanson de la négresse blonde"	3:44
8.	"Les Couloirs des Halles"	4:21
9.	"Les Élans du cœur"	4:47
10.	"Jamais partir"	5:09
Total length:		48:45

== Weekly charts ==
Chart	Peak position
France (SNEP)	1

== Certifications ==
Region	Certification	Certified units/sales
France (SNEP)	2× Platinum	600,000^{*}
Switzerland (IFPI Switzerland)	Gold	25,000^{^}
^{*} Sales figures based on certification alone.^{^} Shipments figures based on certification alone.
