= Musidisc =

French record label

- Parent company: Universal Music Group (since 1999)
- Founded: 1927
- Genre: Various
- Country of origin: France
- Location: Paris

Musidisc is a French record label that provides music and home video distribution. It was founded in 1927, and purchased by Universal Music Group in 1999.

== History ==
Musidisc is known for having produced a rare recording of Jeanne Calment, who has had the longest confirmed human life span in history. On February 19, 1996, just two days before her 121st birthday, Time's Mistress, a four-track CD of Calment speaking over a background of rap and hip hop, was released.

== Sublabels ==
- Accord
- Adda
- Ades
