= Frank Thomas (songwriter) =

French songwriter

Frank Thomas, born Franc Georges Fernand Combès, (15 May 1936 – 20 January 2017) was a French songwriter. Over the course of his career, he wrote songs for Claude François, Sylvie Vartan, Michel Polnareff, Gilbert Bécaud, Joe Dassin and Gérard Berliner.
