= Guy Magenta =

French composer

- Born: 11 July 1927; Paris, France
- Died: 29 October 1967 (aged 40) Salbris, France
- Genre: Chanson
- Years active: 1951-1967

Guy Magenta (11 July 1927 – 29 October 1967) was a French composer. He composed a number of songs between 1951 and his death in 1967, including "Capri in May", later recorded by Jackie Gleason on Capitol Records and Tony Bennett on Columbia Records.
