= Jacques Datin =

French composer

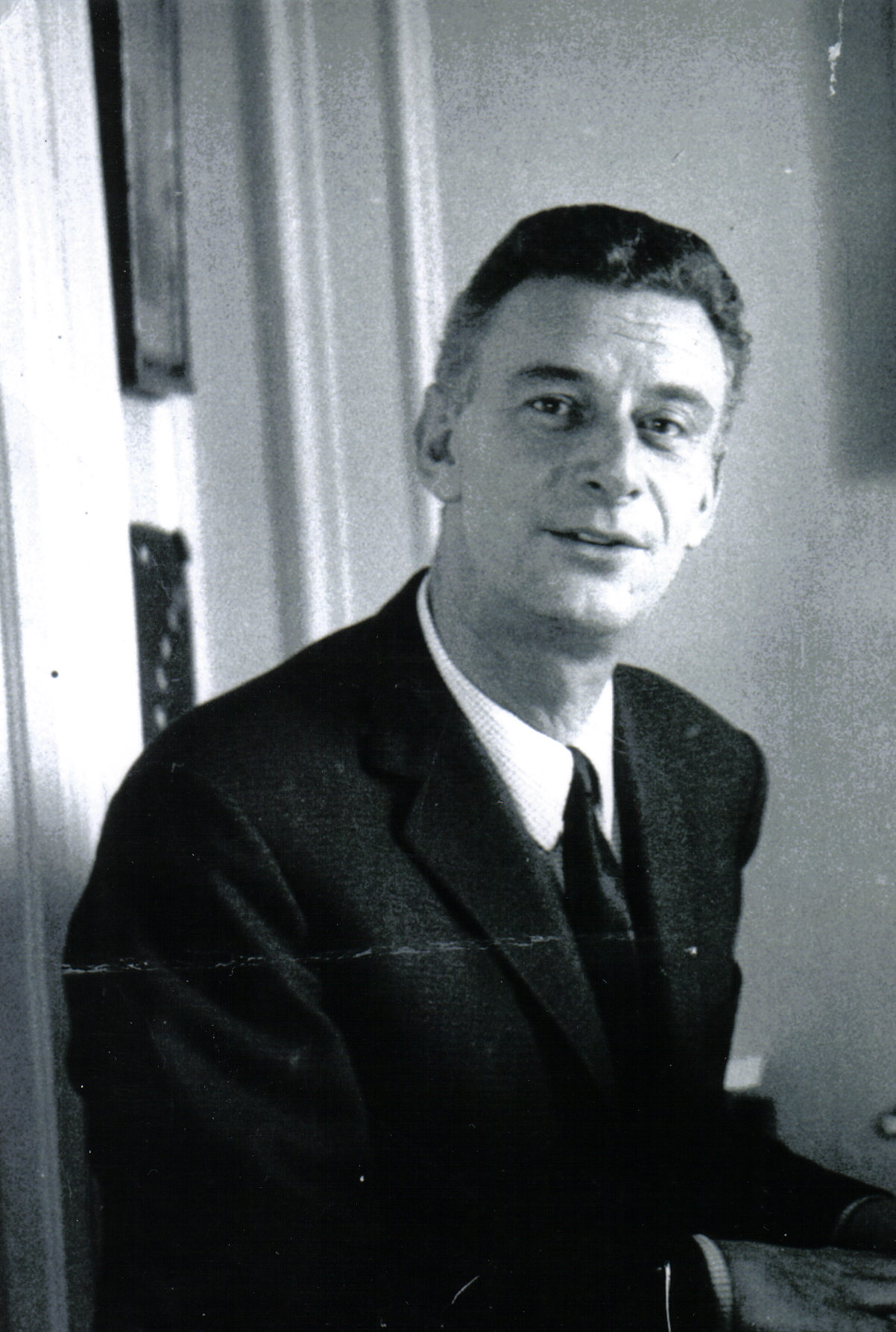
- Born: 14 June 1920
- Died: 24 August 1973 (aged 53)
- Occupation: composer
- Notable work: composed the music for the French version of The Taming of the Shrew

Jacques Datin (14 June 1920 – 24 August 1973) was a French composer.

After his musical training he met songwriter Maurice Vidalin, and they wrote many songs for several performers. Since 1954, they wrote "On en dira" (written with Marc Lanjean) for Juliette Gréco. From 1957, the association had many musical successes such as, for example, "Zon zon zon" interpreted by Colette Renard and Michèle Arnaud (1957), "Julie" by Marcel Amont (1957), and "Les boutons dorés" by Jean-Jacques Debout, also covered by Barbara in 1959.

Their greatest success arrived in 1961 when they won the Eurovision Song Contest along with Jean-Claude Pascal, who competed for Luxembourg with the song "Nous les amoureux". The following year, they got 3rd place with "Petit bonhomme", sung by Camillo Felgen. He wrote the music for Claude Nougaro's Une petite fille (1962).

The many performers of his songs include France Gall ("Christiansen", "Mes premières vraies vacances"), Juliette Greco ("Jusqu'à où, jusqu'à quand" and "Les Mariés"), Françoise Hardy ("Va pas prendre un tambour", "Le Temps des souvenirs") Serge Lama ("Les P'tites Femmes de Pigalle"), Claude Nougaro ("Une petite fille", "Le Jazz et la Java", "Je suis sous.."), Serge Reggiani ("Le Petit Garçon") and Édith Piaf, for whom he wrote "Dans ma rue" (1946).

In 1964 he composed the music for the French version of The Taming of the Shrew, a telefilm that Pierre Badel adapted from Shakespeare's play.
