= Alain Goraguer =

French composer, music arranger, orchestra leader (1931–2023)

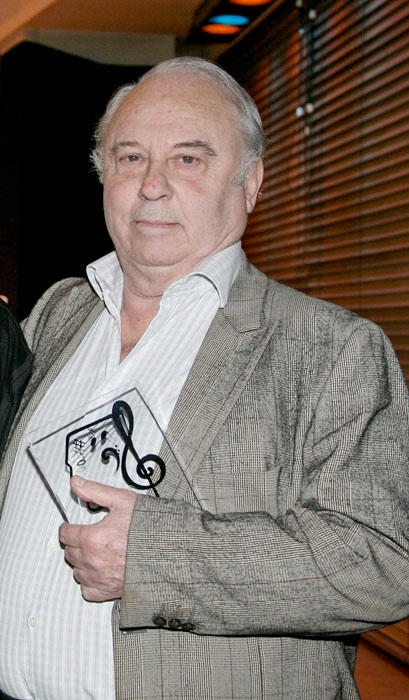
- Born: 20 August 1931; Rosny-sous-Bois, French Third Republic
- Died: 13 February 2023 (aged 91)
- Occupations: Pianist, arranger, composer

Alain Goraguer (French pronunciation: [alɛ̃ ɡɔʁaɡɛʁ]; 20 August 1931 – 13 February 2023) was a French jazz pianist, arranger, and composer. He was a sideman of Boris Vian and Serge Gainsbourg, and a composer/arranger for Gainsbourg, Salvatore Adamo, Jean Ferrat, Serge Reggiani, and Nana Mouskouri.

In 1965 he was the orchestra conductor for Luxembourg's winning entry in the Eurovision Song Contest, "Poupée de cire, poupée de son". (Though it represented Luxembourg, the song had an entirely French creative team behind it, as it was sung by France Gall, written by Gainsbourg, and conducted by Goraguer.)

He composed some or all of the music for films including La Planète Sauvage (1973), La Vie de bohème (1992), Deux jours à tuer (2008) and Saint Laurent (2014).

Alain Goraguer in 1952

Goraguer died on 13 February 2023, at the age of 91.

== Composer ==
Film	Year
Deux jours à tuer	2008
Jeux de plage	1995
L'aigle et le cheval (TV Movie)	1994
Le raisin d'or (TV Movie)	1994
Au beau rivage (TV Movie)	1994
L'oeil écarlate	1993
Le galopin (TV Movie)	1993
Le réveillon, c'est à quel étage? (TV Movie)	1992
Quiproquos! (TV Movie)	1991
Bébé express (TV Movie)	1991
L'ordinateur amoureux (TV Movie)	1991
Marie Pervenche (TV Series) (1 episode)	1990
Adieu je t'aime	1988
À notre regrettable époux	1988
Comment Wang-Fo fut sauvé (Short)	1987
Florence ou La vie de château (TV Series)	1987
Ich heirate eine Familie (TV Series)	1983-1985
L'Initiation d'une femme mariée	1983
Chambres d'amis très particulières	1983
Merci Sylvestre (TV Series)	1983
Jakob und Adele (TV Series)	1982
The Dominici Affair	1973
Fantastic Planet	1973

== Soundtracks ==
Film	Year
Dansez gym tonic"	2015
Saint Laurent	2014
Memòries de la tele (TV Series)	2008 - 2010
Deux jours à tuer (music: "Le temps qui reste")	2008
Enemies closer (writer: "Le cha cha cha du loup")	2008
La vie de bohème	1992
Ein Heim für Tiere (TV Series)	1985
Marie Pervenche (TV Series)	1984
The Eurovision Song Contest (TV Special) (performer: "Bien plus fort")	1966
The Eurovision Song Contest (TV Special) (performer: "Poupée De Cire, Poupée De Son")	1965
Maillan 33-33 (TV Movie) (music: "Le Zouave du Pont de l'Alma")	1964
L'eau à la bouche (performer: "L'eau à la bouche")	1960

== See also ==
- List of jazz arrangers
