= France Gall =

French singer (1947–2018)

- Gall in 1966
- Born: Isabelle Geneviève Marie Anne Gall; 9 October 1947; Paris, France
- Died: 7 January 2018 (aged 70); Neuilly-sur-Seine, France
- Burial place: Montmartre Cemetery, Paris, France
- Occupation: Singer
- Spouse: Michel Berger (m. 1976; died 1992)
- Children: 2, including Raphaël Hamburger
- Father: Robert Gall
- Relatives: Paul Berthier (grandfather); Jacques Berthier (uncle)
- Musical career
- Genres: Yé-yé; pop; synth-pop
- Works: France Gall discography
- Years active: 1963–1997
- Labels: WEA France; Philips France

Isabelle Geneviève Marie Anne Gall (9 October 1947 – 7 January 2018), known professionally as France Gall (French: [fʁɑ̃s ɡal]), was a French yé-yé and pop singer. In 1965, at the age of 17, she won the tenth edition of the Eurovision Song Contest with the song "Poupée de cire, poupée de son", representing Luxembourg. Later in her career, she worked with singer-songwriter Michel Berger, whom she married in 1976. Her most successful singles include "Il jouait du piano debout", "Ella, elle l'a" and "Évidemment". Gall is regarded as one of the most acclaimed French pop singers.

== Early life ==
France Gall was born Isabelle Geneviève Marie Anne Gall on 9 October 1947 in the 12th arrondissement of Paris. She grew up in a family of musicians. Her father, Robert Gall (1918–1990), was a lyricist who wrote for Édith Piaf and Charles Aznavour. Her mother, singer Cécile Berthier (1921–2021), was the daughter of Paul Berthier (1884–1953), co-founder of the celebrated choir The Little Singers of Paris. The only daughter of her family, Gall had two older brothers, twins Patrice and Philippe. She attended Lycée Paul Valéry, but quit school when she was required to repeat a grade after failing the previous year.

== Career ==
=== 1963–1964: Early career ===
Encouraged by her father, Gall launched her musical career in 1963, signing with Philips Records after an audition at the Théâtre des Champs-Élysées. To distinguish herself from the established singer Isabelle Aubret, her artistic director Denis Bourgeois suggested she adopt the stage name France Gall. Inspiration for this name was taken from a recent rugby match between France and Wales ('France–Galles' in French).

On her sixteenth birthday, her debut single "Ne sois pas si bête", an adaptation of "Stand a Little Closer" by the Laurie Sisters, premiered on French radio and quickly became a success. Bourgeois then asked Serge Gainsbourg – already established as a songwriter for artists such as Michèle Arnaud and Juliette Gréco – to write for Gall. His composition "N'écoute pas les idoles" was released as her second single and reached the top of the charts in March 1964.

She soon began performing live, making her debut as the opening act for Sacha Distel in Belgium. Through her work with songwriters including Gainsbourg, Alain Goraguer, and Jacques Datin, she developed a diverse repertoire navigating between jazz, children's songs and other genres. Her collaboration with Gainsbourg continued to yield popular singles, including the 1964 hit "Laisse tomber les filles".

=== 1965–1968: International breakthrough ===
In early 1965, it was announced that Gall had been selected by the Compagnie Luxembourgeoise de Télédiffusion (CLT) to represent Luxembourg in that year's Eurovision Song Contest. From the ten songs proposed to her, she chose Gainsbourg's "Poupée de cire, poupée de son" as her entry. On 20 March 1965, she performed at the contest held in Naples, Italy, where the song was "allegedly booed in rehearsals for straying so far from the sort of song usually heard in the Contest at this point".

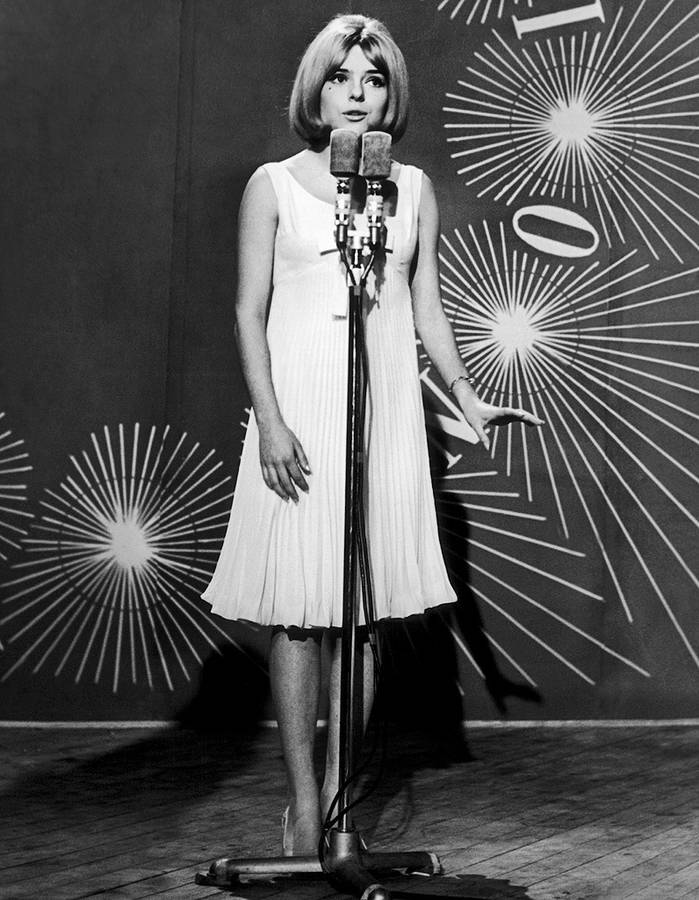
Gall performing at the Eurovision Song Contest 1965

Her performance faced further criticism, with several critics noting that it was "far from perfect" and out-of-tune. Despite this, she won the contest with a total of 32 points, receiving the top score from the Austrian, Dutch, Finnish and German juries. Her victory in the Eurovision Song Contest boosted Gall's recognition abroad, and she went on to release German, Italian and Japanese versions of her winning song.

In 1966, Gall released another successful song written by Gainsbourg titled "Les Sucettes". Although the song was ostensibly about a young girl who likes aniseed-flavoured lollipops, plays-on-words in the lyrics implied another meaning, alluding to oral sex. Gall was 18 at the time the song was released, and she maintained that she was unaware of the song's double entendres. She later stated that this had led her to feel humiliated and betrayed by the adults around her.

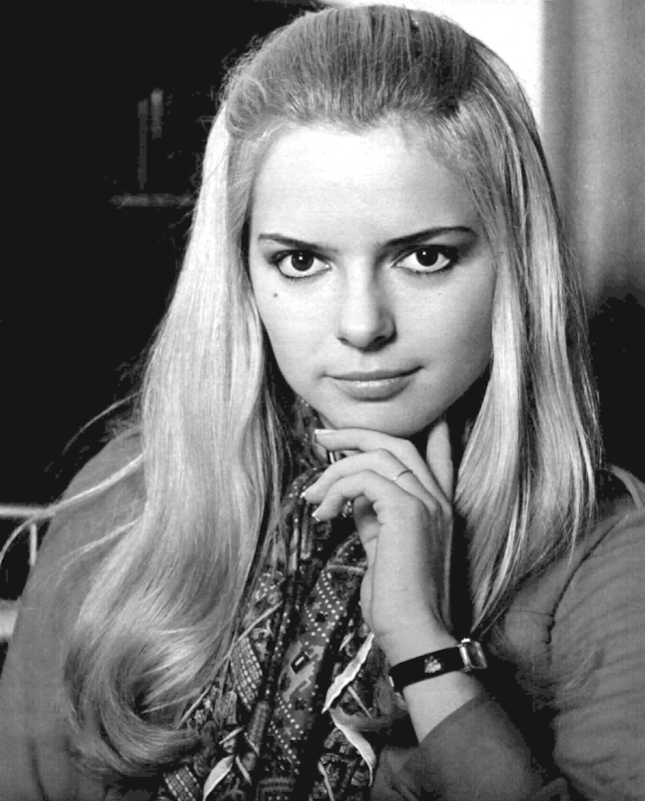
Gall in a 1968 edition of Radiocorriere TV

Under Gainsbourg's guidance, Gall subsequently entered an era of psychedelic music, resulting in the studio album 1968. The album featured a song about a deadly LSD trip, titled "Teenie Weenie Boppie", and the single "Bébé requin". At the same time, Gall pursued a career in German-language music, releasing songs produced by Werner Müller, such as "Zwei Apfelsinen im Haar" and "Der Computer Nr. 3".

=== 1969–1973: New record label ===
Upon the expiration of her contract with Philips at the end of 1968, Gall ended her cooperation with Denis Bourgeois. She switched to the record label La Compagnie in 1969, but did not succeed in finding a coherent style with Norbert Saada as her artistic director. She achieved some success with "L'Orage", the French version of "La pioggia", which she performed alongside Gigliola Cinquetti at the Sanremo Music Festival 1969. She also entered the Belgian charts with the song "Les Années folles", an adaptation of "Gentlemen Please" by Barbara Ruskin.

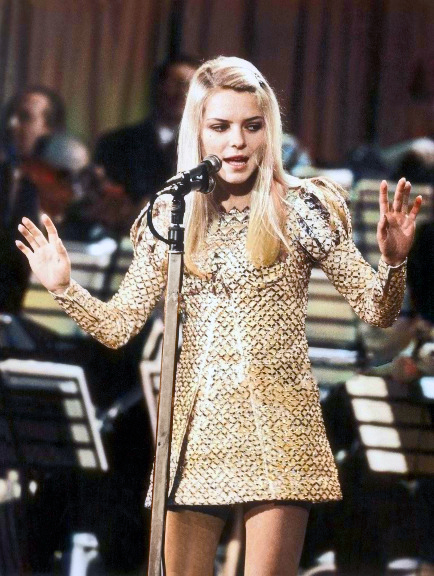
Gall performing at the Sanremo Music Festival in 1969

Her 1970 singles, including "Zozoï" and "Les Éléphants", were largely ignored, and La Compagnie went bankrupt within three years of its creation. The early 1970s continued to be a barren period for Gall. Although she was the first artist in France to record for Atlantic Records in 1971, her singles "C'est cela l'amour" and "Chasse neige" faltered in the charts. 1972 marked the last time Gall recorded songs by Gainsbourg – "Frankenstein" and "Les Petits ballons" – which both failed to chart. A brief collaboration with Jean-Michel Rivat as her artistic director also remained unsuccessful.

=== 1974–1980s: Collaboration with Michel Berger ===
In 1973, Gall came into contact with Michel Berger, having been struck by his song "Attends-moi". The following year she featured on his track "Mon fils rira du rock'n'roll". At her publisher's request, Berger then began writing for Gall, producing the single "La Déclaration d'amour" in 1974. Their professional collaboration evolved into a romantic relationship, and they married on 22 June 1976.

In 1976, she released the self-titled album France Gall, followed by Dancing Disco in 1977 containing the hit song "Si maman si". In 1979, she played the role of Cristal in the rock opera Starmania, produced by Berger and Canadian lyricist Luc Plamondon. The show played for one month at the Palais des congrès de Paris. Gall's performances of "Monopolis", "Besoin d'amour", and her duet with Daniel Balavoine, "Quand on n'a plus rien à perdre", were widely acclaimed.

In 1980, Gall had her first number one hit in France since "Poupée de cire, poupée de son" with the song "Il jouait du piano debout". The song became the opening track of the album Paris, France. The following year, she collaborated with British singer Elton John on the songs "Les Aveux" and "Donner pour donner". Paris, France was followed by the albums Tout pour la musique in 1981 – featuring the song "Résiste" – and Débranche! in 1984.

In 1985, Gall joined Chanteurs Sans Frontières, on the initiative of Valérie Lagrange. With Berger and Balavoine, she was also involved in the humanitarian action group Action Écoles. On 14 January 1986, during a trip to Africa, Balavoine died in a helicopter crash. The 1987 song "Évidemment", written by Berger and sung by Gall, is a homage to their lost friend, and appeared on the album Babacar. On the same album, the title track "Babacar" recounts Gall and Berger's encounter with a mother in Dakar, Senegal, who asked Gall to adopt her child. They chose to provide financial aid instead, using the song's proceeds to secure housing and education for the family. Another track from the album, "Ella, elle l'a" – a tribute to Ella Fitzgerald – topped the pop charts in several countries in 1987 and 1988.

=== 1990s: Double jeu and retirement ===
In the early 1990s, Gall and Berger produced a joint album titled Double jeu, which they released on 12 June 1992. Following its release, they announced a series of concerts at several Parisian venues. However, Berger unexpectedly died of a heart attack on 2 August 1992. Although Gall was strongly affected by Berger's death, she wanted to complete the project as they had planned. She decided to commit to the performances at Bercy Arena and promoted the songs that she and Berger had recorded together.

After residing in Los Angeles for some time, Gall released her sixteenth and final solo album France in 1996. The same year, she headlined at the concert venue Olympia. In 1997, after the death of her daughter Pauline, she announced her retirement from the music industry. Gall subsequently spent much time at her residence on the island of Ngor, Senegal.

=== Post-retirement ===
In retirement, Gall limited herself to occasional public appearances. As a farewell to her musical career, the documentary France Gall par France Gall was shot and broadcast in 2001. She achieved renewed commercial success in 2004 with the compilation album Évidemment, which charted in France, Belgium, and Switzerland. In 2007, she participated in the France 2 documentary Tous pour la musique, marking the fifteenth anniversary of Michel Berger's death.

In 2015, she launched the jukebox musical Résiste, which she wrote with her partner Bruck Dawit. The show featured songs written by Michel Berger throughout his career. In late 2024, nearly seven years after her death, the compilation album Plus haut appeared, featuring the previously unreleased 1974 recording "La Prisonnière". The song was recorded as part of the unfinished project Angelina Dumas, a musical Gall and Berger had been developing inspired by the story of Patty Hearst.

== Personal life and death ==
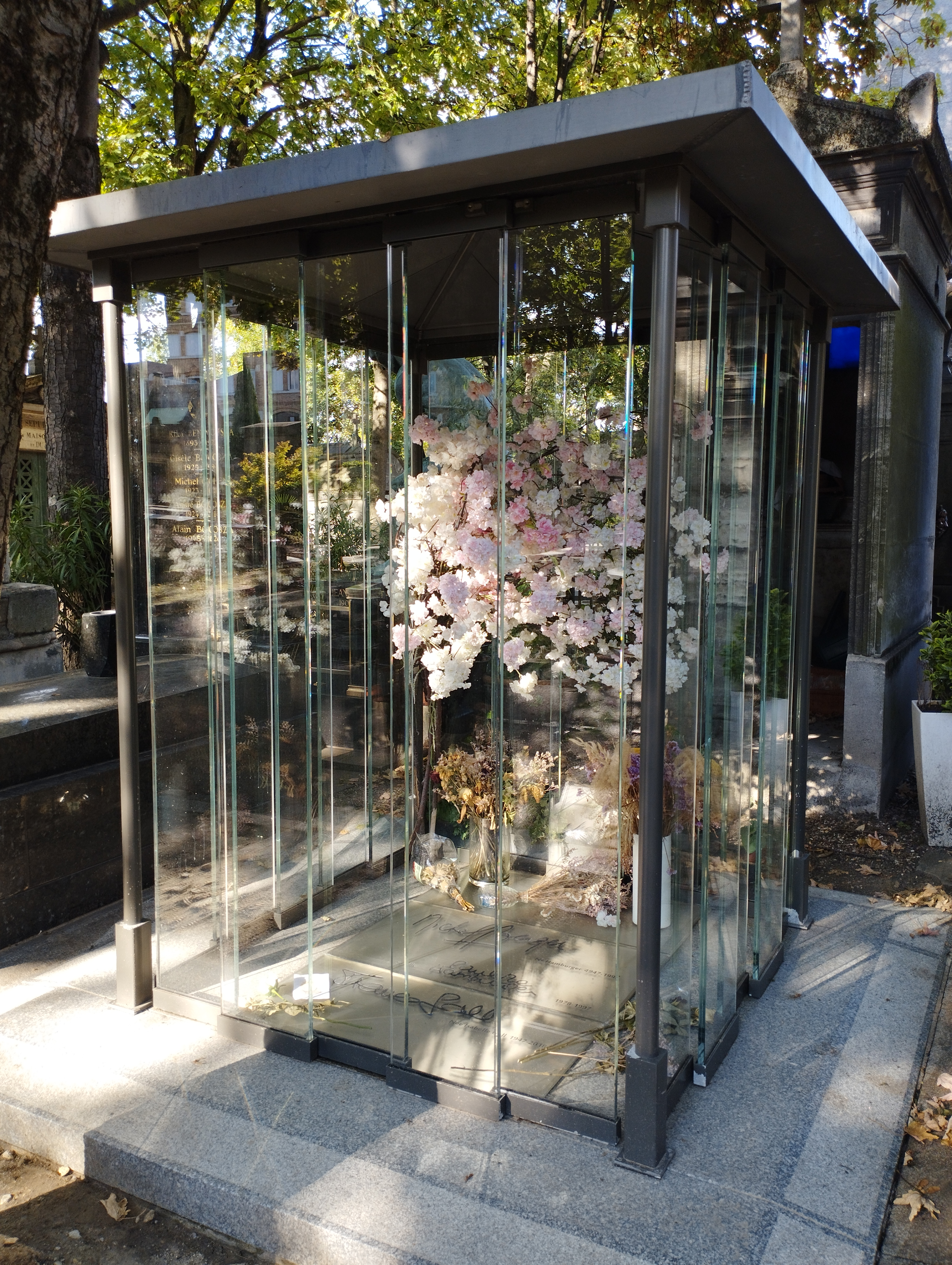
Tomb of France Gall

Gall had been in relationships with singers Claude François and Julien Clerc, before marrying Michel Berger on 22 June 1976. They had two children together, Pauline (born 1978) and Raphaël (born 1981). Her daughter Pauline was diagnosed with cystic fibrosis shortly after birth. Gall and Berger placed their hopes in advances in medical research while keeping details of Pauline's condition private. The couple agreed to alternate their professional commitments in order to care for their daughter.

While working on the album Double jeu, Gall and Berger were reportedly in the process of separating, yet they continued collaborating artistically. Following Berger's death in 1992, Gall met Ethiopian-American musician Bruck Dawit in 1995, with whom she began a relationship. Her daughter Pauline died on 18 December 1997, after which Gall only made occasional public appearances.

On 7 January 2018, Gall died, aged 70, of an infection after a two-year battle with a cancer of undisclosed primary origin, at the American Hospital of Paris in Neuilly-sur-Seine. French president Emmanuel Macron responded to the news of her death on Twitter, stating: "She leaves behind songs that everyone in France knows and set an example of a life devoted to others". She was buried with her husband and daughter on 20 Avenue Rachel (division 29) at Montmartre Cemetery in Paris.

== Discography ==
=== Albums ===
- N'écoute pas les idoles (March 1964)
- Mes premières vraies vacances (August 1964)
- Sacré Charlemagne (December 1964)
- Poupée de cire, poupée de son (April 1965)
- Baby pop (October 1966)
- FG (November 1966)
- 1968 (January 1968)
- France Gall (6 January 1976)
- Dancing Disco (27 April 1977)
- Paris, France (19 May 1980)
- Tout pour la musique (10 December 1981)
- Débranche ! (2 April 1984)
- Babacar (19 February 1987)
- Double jeu (with Michel Berger, 12 June 1992)
- France (29 March 1996)

== Trivia ==
- Serge Gainsbourg secretly recorded Gall's laughter to use in "Pauvre Lola", a track on his 1964 album Gainsbourg Percussions.
- In January 2010, Gall was portrayed by Sara Forestier in the biographical drama film Gainsbourg: A Heroic Life.
- On 9 October 2023, Google celebrated what would have been her 76th birthday, five and a half years after her death, with a Google Doodle.
- In 2025, Luxembourg's entry in the Eurovision Song Contest – "La poupée monte le son" by Laura Thorn – paid tribute to Gall, referencing her 1965 entry "Poupée de cire, poupée de son".

Awards and achievements
Preceded by (Italy) Gigliola Cinquetti with "Non ho l'età"	Winner of the Eurovision Song Contest; 1965	Succeeded by (Austria) Udo Jürgens with "Merci, Chérie"
Preceded by Hugues Aufray	Luxembourg in the Eurovision Song Contest; 1965	Succeeded by Michèle Torr
