= Robert Gall =

French lyricist

Robert Gall (27 May 1918 – 16 December 1990) was a French lyricist who was prominent in the 1950s and 1960s. He wrote songs for Édith Piaf, Charles Aznavour, and Yves Montand. His best known works include the hit "La mamma" which he wrote for Azanavour.

The father of singer France Gall, he wrote the lyrics to her 1964 hit “Sacré Charlemagne". He collaborated with Serge Gainsbourg to produce her other hits including "N'écoute pas les idoles" and "Poupée de cire, poupée de son", the winning song in the 1965 Eurovision Song Contest.

He was married to Cécile Berthier, daughter of Paul Berthier, co-founder of Petits Chanteurs à la Croix de Bois. Gall is buried in the Cemetery of Montmartre.
