= Michel Berger =

French singer and songwriter (1947–1992)

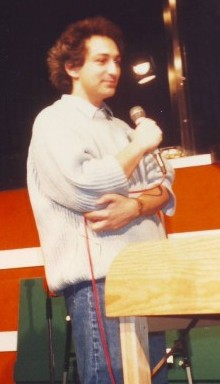
- Berger in 1990
- Born: Michel Jean Hamburger; 28 November 1947; Neuilly-sur-Seine, France
- Died: 2 August 1992 (aged 44); Ramatuelle, France
- Occupations: Composer and singer
- Years active: 1960s–1992
- Spouse: France Gall (m. 1976)
- Children: 2, including Raphaël Hamburger
- Parent(s): Jean Hamburger (father); Annette Haas (mother)

Michel Jean Hamburger (28 November 1947 – 2 August 1992), known professionally as Michel Berger, was a French singer and songwriter. He was a figure of France's pop music scene for two decades as a singer. As a songwriter he wrote for artists such as his wife France Gall, Françoise Hardy or Johnny Hallyday. He died of a heart attack at age 44.

== Biography ==
Berger was born on 28 November 1947 in the Parisian suburb of Neuilly-sur-Seine, the son of Jewish parents, Dr. Jean Hamburger and Annette Haas, a concert pianist of Swiss-Jewish origin.

Berger first became known to the French public in the 1960s as singer of hit song Salut les copains, after which he became record producer and songwriter for EMI and where he wrote amongst others Les Girafes for Bourvil in 1967. In the early 1970s, he moved to Warner Music where he produced the early albums of Véronique Sanson, and Allah in 1989. In 1973, he was responsible for producing the album Message personnel, the title track of which relaunched Françoise Hardy's career. He also produced the single Je suis moi for Hardy. Berger started writing for France Gall in 1974, produced all her albums from 1975 on, and married her on 22 June 1976.

In 1978, he composed the musical: Starmania, with lyrics by Luc Plamondon. The musical starred Gall, Claude Dubois, Daniel Balavoine, Diane Dufresne, Nanette Workman, Éric Estève and Fabienne Thibeault. It was a big success in France in the 1980s and 1990s. An English version, entitled Tycoon, was released in 1991 with lyrics by Tim Rice, but it did not achieve the success the original version had in France.

Unfortunately, the two musicals Berger worked on immediately after Starmania did not fare well. In 1980, Berger partnered with producer Jérôme Savary and lyricist Luc Plamondon to produce the musical La Légende de Jimmy, inspired by the life of James Dean. However, this bombed. Berger's next musical project, Dreams in Stone, was conceived as an American musical, co-arranged with Michel Bernholc, and recorded in the United States, with lead vocals by singers Rosanne Cash, Bill Champlin, Lynn Carey, Jennifer Warnes, and Bill Withers among others. Though the show itself never saw the light of day, the album was nevertheless released in 1982. The album was a complete flop, and is not generally known outside of a few fansites.

Berger also scored several film projects over the years, which included Mektoub, a 1970 film by Algerian Director Ali Ghalem, Robert Benayoun's Sérieux comme le plaisir in 1975, Jean-Paul Rappeneau's Tout feu, tout flamme in 1982 and Rive droite, rive gauche the 1984 film by Philippe Labro. He also wrote an Orangina advertisement jingle.

Berger was one of a handful of French artists who participated readily and actively in humanitarian acts: in 1985, he worked exclusively for Action Écoles alongside Gall, Richard Berry and Daniel Balavoine, then later for Ethiopia with Renaud (Chanteurs Sans Frontières) and for Les Restos du cœur with comedian Coluche.

== Death ==
On 2 August 1992, weeks after the release of his first album of duets with France Gall and six months after the death of his father, Berger suffered a fatal heart attack after a tennis match at Ramatuelle in southern France.

His death came as a shock to many as he had been one of the most popular French singer-songwriters of the 1970s and 1980s. He was more interested in music and family life than in rock and roll excesses and his marriage to Gall was stable.

Berger was buried in Paris, in the Montmartre cemetery. His daughter Pauline, who died of cystic fibrosis in 1997 aged only 19, is buried close by. He was also the father of French music supervisor Raphaël Hamburger.

== Tribute ==
On 28 November 2019, Google celebrated his 72nd birthday with a Google Doodle.

== Discography ==
=== Albums ===
Studio albums

- 1973: Michel Berger (Le coeur brisé)
- 1974: Chansons pour une fan
- 1975: Que l'amour est bizarre
- 1976: Mon piano danse
- 1980: Beauséjour
- 1981: Beaurivage
- 1981: Tout feu tout flamme (instrumental movie soundtrack)
- 1982: Dreams in Stone
  - With Bill Withers on "Apple Pie" ); background vocals Denise DeCaro on "Innocent Eyes" (instrumental)
- 1983: Voyou
- 1984: Rive droite - Rive gauche (instrumental movie soundtrack)
- 1985: Différences
- 1990: Ça ne tient pas debout
- 1992: Double jeu (with France Gall)

Live albums

- 1980: Au Théâtre des Champs-Élysées
- 1983: En public au Palais des Sports
- 1986: Au Zénith

Compilation albums

- 2014: Pour me comprendre - Best of

=== Singles ===
For comprehensive list, see lescharts.com website

Selective

- "Quelques mots d'amour"
- "Seras-tu là?"
- "Le paradis blanc"
- "La groupie du pianiste"
- "Diego, libre dans sa tête"
- "Chanter pour ceux qui sont loin de chez eux"

Selective (charted singles with France Gall)

- 1992: "Laissez passer les rêves" (FR #37)
- 1992: "Superficiel et léger" (FR #42)

== Booklets ==
- Plamondon & Berger : Full Text of the Rock Opera, La Légende de Jimmy, Éditions Le Cherche Midi, Paris, 1990, ISBN 2-86274-189-2
- Plamondon & Berger : Full Text of the Rock Opera, Starmania, 1995 Éditions Le Cherche Midi, Paris, ISBN 2-86274-357-7

== Filmography ==
- Berger, alongside fellow musicians Michel Fugain and Michel Sardou, appeared as extras (uncredited roles) in the 1966 René Clément film Paris brûle-t-il? (English title Is Paris Burning?). Berger played the role of "Chef des explosifs", whereas Fugain and Sardou appeared as student protestors.

== Biographies ==
- Hugues Royer & Philippe Seguy: France Gall – Michel Berger, Deux destins pour une légende, Éditions du Rocher, 1994, ISBN 2-268-01873-3
- Jean-François Brieu & Éric Didi: Michel Berger – Quelques mots d'amour, Éditions Jean-Claude Lattès, 1997, ISBN 2-7096-1798-6
- Jacques Pessis: Michel Berger, Collection Les Lumières du Music-Hall – Éditions Vade Retro, 2001, ISBN 2-909828-80-8

== Essays ==
- France Gall & Jean Brousse: Michel Berger – Si Le Bonheur Existe, 2002 Éditions Le Cherche Midi, Paris, ISBN 2-7491-0012-7
