= Cock Robin discography =

- Studio albums: 7
- EPs: 1
- Live albums: 1
- Compilation albums: 8
- Singles: 12
- Video albums: 1

This is the discography of American pop rock band Cock Robin.

== Albums ==
=== Studio albums ===
Title	Album details	Peak chart positions									Certifications
Title	Album details	US	BE (WA)	EUR	FRA	GER	NL	NOR	SWE	SWI	Certifications
Cock Robin	Released: June 1985; Label: Columbia, CBS; Formats: CD, LP, MC	61	—	12	3	9	2	—	30	11	FRA: 2×Gold; GER: Gold; NL: Gold
After Here Through Midland	Released: May 25, 1987; Label: Columbia, CBS; Formats: CD, LP, MC	166	—	17	4	5	6	8	9	3	FRA: Platinum; SWI: Gold
First Love / Last Rites	Released: October 30, 1989; Label: Columbia, CBS; Formats: CD, LP, MC	—	—	55	11	—	—	—	—	—	FRA: 2×Gold
I Don't Want to Save the World	Released: May 15, 2006; Label: 31 Production Edition; Formats: CD, digital download	—	—	—	175	—	—	—	—	—	
Songs from a Bell Tower	Released: October 11, 2010; Label: 31 Production Edition; Formats: CD, 2xCD, digital download	—	—	—	—	—	—	—	—	—	
Chinese Driver	Released: March 11, 2016; Label: Verycords; Formats: CD, digital download	—	163	—	250	—	—	—	—	—	
Homo Alien	Released: September 17, 2021; Label: Verycords; Formats: CD, digital download	—	—	—	—	—	—	—	—	—	
"—" denotes releases that did not chart or were not released in that territory.

=== Live albums ===
Title	Album details
Live	Released: May 11, 2009; Label: 31 Production Edition; Formats: CD, digital download

=== Compilation albums ===
Title	Album details	Peak chart positions							Certifications
Title	Album details	BE (FL)	BE (WA)	DEN	FRA	GER	NL	NOR	Certifications
Collection Gold	Released: 1990; Label: CBS; Formats: CD, MC	—	—	—	—	—	—	—	
The Best of Cock Robin	Released: December 1991; Label: Columbia; Formats: CD, MC	—	31	—	1 (Note: Peak position on the Compilations Chart)	—	4	—	FRA: 2×Platinum; NL: Gold
Best Ballads	Released: April 1995; Label: Columbia; Formats: CD, MC, MD	12	10	—	—	60	94	—	
Simply the Best	Released: March 1999; Label: Columbia; Formats: CD	—	—	—	—	—	—	—	
The Collection	Released: September 2000; Label: Connoisseur Collection; Formats: CD	—	—	—	—	—	—	—	
The Very Best of Cock Robin	Released: 2001; Label: Columbia; Formats: CD	—	—	2	—	—	—	1	
Les indispensables de Cock Robin	Released: September 2001; Label: Sony Music; Formats: CD	—	—	—	27	—	—	—	
Open Book – The Best of Cock Robin	Released: February 2011; Label: Camden/Sony Music; Formats: CD, digital download	—	—	—	—	—	—	—	
"—" denotes releases that did not chart or were not released in that territory.

=== Video albums ===
Title	Album details
Live in Concert - at the Grand Rex	Released: 1990 France; Cat: 49867 2; Label: CMV Enterprises; Format: VHS

== EPs ==
Title	Album details
Lollobrigida	Released: April 7, 2017; Label: Cock Robin; Formats: digital download

== Singles ==
Title	Year	Peak chart positions										Certifications	Album
Title	Year	US	BE (FL)	EUR	FRA	GER	IRE	NL	SWE	SWI	UK	Certifications	Album
"When Your Heart Is Weak"	1985	35	30	15	9	8	25	19	—	—	—	FRA: Silver	Cock Robin
"Thought You Were on My Side"	1985	—	4	40	39	21	—	4	—	—	—		Cock Robin
"The Promise You Made" (Note: "The Promise You Made" was first released as a promotional single in the US in November 1985, but was not released commercially until January 1986.)	1986	—	1	8	4	6	11	1	—	7	28	FRA: Silver; NL: Platinum	Cock Robin
"Once We Might Have Known" (US-only release)	1986	—	—	—	—	—	—	—	—	—	—		Cock Robin
"Just Around the Corner"	1987	—	11	10	18	16	—	14	12	6	—		After Here Through Midland
"The Biggest Fool of All"	1987	—	23	—	47	50	—	80	—	—	—		After Here Through Midland
"El Norte"	1987	—	—	—	—	—	—	—	—	—	—		After Here Through Midland
"Worlds Apart"	1989	—	—	78	22	—	—	41	—	—	—		First Love / Last Rites
"Manzanar"	1990	—	—	—	—	—	—	—	—	—	—		First Love / Last Rites
"Straighter Line"	1990	—	—	—	28	—	—	—	—	—	—		First Love / Last Rites
"Grand"	2010	—	—	—	—	—	—	—	—	—	—		Songs from a Bell Tower
"Now and Then"/"Extraordinary Thing" (Umpff Remixes)	2015	—	—	—	—	—	—	—	—	—	—		Non-album single
"—" denotes releases that did not chart or were not released in that territory.
