= Starmania (album) =

1978 cast recording

Cast recording by the original cast of Starmania
- Released: October 16, 1978
- Studios: Gang (Paris); EMI (London); Secret Sound (New York); Morin Heights (Quebec)
- Genres: Rock opera; pop
- Label: Warner
- Producers: Michel Berger; Luc Plamondon

Singles from Starmania
- 1. "Les Uns contre les autres / Le Monde est Stone" Released: October 1978; 2. "La Chanson de Ziggy" Released: 1978; 3. "Besoin d'amour" Released: January 1979; 4. "Banlieue Nord / Quand on arrive en ville" Released: May 1979

Starmania is the cast album performed by the original cast members of the 1978 cyberpunk rock opera Starmania, with music by Michel Berger and lyrics by Luc Plamondon. It was first issued on vinyl and cassette in 1978. In 1991, Starmania was released on CD with "SOS d'un terrien en détresse" performed by Daniel Balavoine replacing "Starmania (l'air de l'extraterrestre)". The album peaked at number four in France and was certified diamond.

== Track listing ==
All tracks written and produced by Michel Berger and Luc Plamondon.

No.	Title	Performer(s)	Length
1.	"Ouverture" (instrumental)		2:55
2.	"Quand on arrive en ville"	Daniel Balavoine and Nanette Workman	3:40
3.	"Complainte de la serveuse automate"	Fabienne Thibeault	4:50
4.	"Le Blues du businessman"	Claude Dubois	4:25
5.	"Monopolis (dans les villes de l'an 2000)"	France Gall	4:30
6.	"Un garçon pas comme les autres"	Fabienne Thibeault	3:05
7.	"La Chanson de Ziggy"	Éric Estève	4:35
8.	"Travesti"	Nanette Workman	3:55
9.	"Banlieue nord"	Daniel Balavoine	3:35
10.	"Petite Musique terrienne"	Fabienne Thibeault	1:30
11.	"Paranoïa"	Michel Berger	3:30
12.	"Ce soir on danse à Naziland"	Nanette Workman	4:35
13.	"Les Adieux d'un sex-symbol"	Diane Dufresne	5:50
14.	"Ego Trip"	Éric Estève	2:30
15.	"Les Uns contre les autres"	Fabienne Thibeault and Claude Dubois	3:00
16.	"Quand on n'a plus rien à perdre"	Daniel Balavoine and France Gall	3:50
17.	"Le monde est stone"	Fabienne Thibeault	5:30
18.	"Petite Musique terrienne"	Daniel Balavoine	0:45
19.	"Starmania (L'Air de l'extraterrestre)^{[a]}"	René Joly	5:55
20.	"Le Rêve de Stella Spotlight"	Diane Dufresne	2:10
21.	"Besoin d'amour"	France Gall	4:00
22.	"Monopolis" (reprise instrumentale)		2:00

Notes

- ^{^[a]} replaced on later editions by "SOS d'un terrien en détresse" performed by Daniel Balavoine

== Charts ==
Chart performance
Chart (1978–1996)	Peak position
Belgian Albums (Ultratop Wallonia)	19
French Albums (SNEP)	4
Quebec (ADISQ)	1

== Certifications ==
Certifications
Region	Certification	Certified units/sales
France (SNEP)	Diamond	1,000,000^{*}
^{*} Sales figures based on certification alone.

== Tycoon ==
Tycoon

Compilation album by various artists
- Released: 6 July 1992
- Label: Epic
- Producers: Michel Berger; Luc Plamondon; Tim Rice

In 1992, an English version of the show was created with lyrics by Tim Rice, and an album titled Tycoon was released on 6 July 1992. All tracks were produced by Michel Berger, except "The World Is Stone" and "You Have to Learn to Live Alone", which were produced by Cyndi Lauper. Tycoon entered the French chart in early September 1992 and reached number one in March 1993, spending three weeks at the top. As a result, it also reached number 19 on the European Top 100 Albums chart. Tycoon was certified platinum in France in 1993.

=== Singles ===
The first single, "The World Is Stone" by Cyndi Lauper, entered the French chart in August 1992 and reached number two. The second single, "Only the Very Best" by Peter Kingsbery, debuted in January 1993 and also peaked at number two. The final single, "Ziggy" by Celine Dion, entered the chart in July 1993 and likewise reached number two. Lauper's and Dion's singles were both certified gold in France.

=== Track listing ===
No.	Title	Performer(s)	Length
1.	"Overture" ("Ouverture")		3:13
2.	"The World Is Stone" ("Le monde est stone")	Cyndi Lauper	4:26
3.	"A Little Damage Done" ("Quand on arrive en ville")	Matt Goss and Luke Goss	4:03
4.	"Only the Very Best" ("SOS d'un terrien en détresse")	Peter Kingsbery	3:36
5.	"You Get What You Deserve" ("Travesti")	Nina Hagen	4:07
6.	"Ziggy" ("Un garçon pas comme les autres")	Celine Dion	2:58
7.	"Nobody Chooses" ("Banlieue nord")	Willy DeVille	4:42
8.	"Working Girl" ("Complainte de la serveuse automate")	Kim Carnes	4:34
9.	"Tonight We Dance (Extravagance!)" ("Ce soir on danse à Naziland")	Celine Dion	4:44
10.	"Pollution's Child" ("Un enfant de la pollution")	Kevin Robinson	2:33
11.	"I Would Love to Change the World (The Businessman's Blues)" ("Le blues du businessman")	Tom Jones	6:03
12.	"Farewell to a Sex Symbol" ("Les adieux d'un sex-symbol")	Ronnie Spector	5:32
13.	"Ego Trip" ("Ego trip")	Peter Kingsbery	3:50
14.	"You Have to Learn to Live Alone" ("Les uns contre les autres")	Cyndi Lauper	5:11

=== Charts ===
Chart performance
Chart (1992–1993)	Peak position
European Albums (Music & Media)	19
French Albums (SNEP)	1
Quebec (ADISQ)	39

=== Certifications ===
Certifications
Region	Certification	Certified units/sales
France (SNEP)	Platinum	300,000^{*}
^{*} Sales figures based on certification alone.
