= Germain Gauthier =

Canadian singer-songwriter (1950–2025)

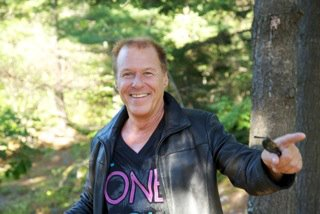
- Born: 1950; Quebec City, Quebec, Canada
- Died: August 28, 2025 (aged 74–75); Montreal, Quebec, Canada
- Occupations: Guitarist, Songwriter, Composer
- Awards: Classics (6, SOCAN); François Cousineau Prize (SPACQ); Great Prize of Québécois songs (Radio-Mutuel)

German Gauthier (1950 – 28 August 2025) was a Québécois guitarist, songwriter and composer.

== Biography ==
Gauthier was born in Quebec City, Quebec, Canada in 1950.

Gauthier started his career as guitarist for small rock bands. In 1971, he became an accompanist for Claire Lepage.

He then started composing music for other authors. He wrote Le mur derrière la grange for Donald Lautrec, Un gars comme toi for Renée Claude and Tous les jours de la semaine for Pierre Létourneau. He published his first album in 1974, and continued collaborating with other authors; notably, Pierre Létourneau and Luc Plamondon.

Starting in 1979, he wrote multiple publicly acclaimed songs for Diane Dufresne, Renée Claude, Nicole Martin, Martine St-Clair, Fabienne Thibault and Nanette Workman. In 1982, Gauthier's composition Call Girl (for Workman, with Plamondon) won the Félix Award for the best-selling 45-rpm record.

Gauthier then recorded some discs and composed the music for the rock opera Les aventures d'Ultra-Vinyl (1983), for the first album of Marc Drouin (1984), for the film Call Girl (1984), for the film La guerre des tuques (1984), for Petula Clark (Mr. Orwell, 1984) and for the musical Vis ta vinaigrette (1986).

Later, he composed for Marie Carmen (Piaf chanterait du rock), Roch Voisine (Avant de partir), Céline Dion ("Dion chante Plamondon") and Joe Bocan (Repartir à zéro). Repartir à zéro won the Radio-Mutuel Great-Prize of Québécois songs. He was nicknamed "Monsieur Hits" (Mr. Hits).

Gauthier won the François Cousineau Prize from the Société professionnelle des auteurs et compositeurs du Québec in 2007. Six of his songs were named Classics of Society of Composers, Authors and Music Publishers of Canada.

He died on 28 August 2025. By his death, his discography totalled over 325 songs, 35 of which had reached number one in Quebec.

== Discography ==
Simples
Year	Title
1974	Malisa/Donne-moi une guitare (instrumental)
1974	T’en viens-tu/Fly Away
1975	Marie Lou/Délivre-moi
1975	Ch'sais pu quoi faire/Était partie
1975	Ma fenime/Instrumental
1976	Mam’zelle Julie/Instrumental
1983	Mascara/Mascara
1984	Exiler/Instrumental
1986	Boy Needs Girl/Instrumental

Albums
Year	Title
1974	Germain Gauthier
