= I Know Them So Well – The Best of Tim Rice =

Compilation album by Tim Rice / various artists
- Released: 1994
- Label: PolyGram; MCA

I Know Them So Well – The Best of Tim Rice (released as Any Dream Will Do – The Best of Tim Rice in some countries) is a compilation album by English songwriter Tim Rice, released in 1994 by PolyGram and MCA Records. It contains some of Rice's best known co-written songs as a lyricist, for musical theatre, films, as well as pop songs, being sung by various artists, including the UK number one singles "Don't Cry for Me Argentina" by Julie Covington, "I Know Him So Well" by Elaine Paige and Barbara Dickson, and "Any Dream Will Do" by Jason Donovan, plus the US number one single "A Whole New World" by Peabo Bryson and Regina Belle, Rice's only US number one single to date.

The compilation's liner notes contain information and thoughts, personally written by Rice, about each individual track—both positive and negative. According to Rice in the liner notes, at the point of writing he had been working with Elton John on songs for the "forthcoming" 1994 film The Lion King, and so none of the tracks from that film are included on this compilation.

The Australian version of the compilation contains a slightly altered track listing, including contributions from artists such as Kate Ceberano, John Farnham and Jon Stevens.

== Track listing ==
=== Standard version ===
No.	Title	Writer(s)	Origin	Length
1.	"The Golden Boy" (Freddie Mercury & Montserrat Caballé)	Tim Rice; Mercury; Mike Moran	Barcelona (1988 album)	5:10
2.	"Oh What a Circus" (David Essex)	Rice; Andrew Lloyd Webber	Evita (1978 musical)	3:50
3.	"I Know Him So Well" (Elaine Paige & Barbara Dickson)	Rice; Benny Andersson; Björn Ulvaeus	Chess (1984 concept album / album musical)	4:14
4.	"Don't Cry for Me Argentina" (Julie Covington)	Rice; Lloyd Webber	Evita	5:25
5.	"Everything's Alright" / "I Don't Know How to Love Him" (Yvonne Elliman & Ian Gillan / Yvonne Elliman)	Rice; Lloyd Webber	Jesus Christ Superstar (1970 album musical)	4:09
6.	"Ziggy" (Celine Dion)	Rice (English lyrics); Michel Berger; Luc Plamondon	Tycoon (1992 musical; English version of French rock opera Starmania)	2:56
7.	"All Time High" (Rita Coolidge)	Rice; John Barry	Octopussy (1983 theme song to the James Bond film)	2:58
8.	"The World Is Stone" (Cyndi Lauper)	Rice (English lyrics); Berger; Plamondon	Tycoon	3:57
9.	"One Night in Bangkok" (Murray Head)	Rice; Andersson; Ulvaeus	Chess	5:01
10.	"Another Suitcase in Another Hall" (Barbara Dickson)	Rice; Lloyd Webber	Evita	3:00
11.	"Any Dream Will Do" (Jason Donovan)	Rice; Lloyd Webber	Joseph and the Amazing Technicolor Dreamcoat (1991 musical)	3:51
12.	"The Second Time" (Elaine Paige)	Rice; Francis Lai	Elaine Paige (1981 album)	4:07
13.	"The Least of My Troubles" (Paul Nicholas)	Rice; Stephen Oliver	Blondel (1983 rock opera)	3:57
14.	"Close Every Door" (Phillip Schofield)	Rice; Lloyd Webber	Joseph and the Amazing Technicolor Dreamcoat (1991 musical)	3:01
15.	"Song of the King" (David Daltrey & The Mixed Bag featuring Tim Rice)	Rice; Lloyd Webber	Joseph and the Amazing Technicolor Dreamcoat (1968 musical)	2:56
16.	"A Winter's Tale" (David Essex)	Rice; Mike Batt	(1982 single; later included on the David Essex album The Whisper)	4:10
17.	"The Legal Boys" (Elton John)	Rice; John	Jump Up! (1982 Elton John album)	3:06
18.	"Only the Very Best" (Peter Kingsbery)	Rice (English lyrics); Berger; Plamondon	Tycoon	3:34
19.	"Superstar" (Murray Head)	Rice; Lloyd Webber	(1969 single; later included in Jesus Christ Superstar musical)	4:16
20.	"A Whole New World (Aladdin's Theme)" (Peabo Bryson & Regina Belle)	Rice; Alan Menken	Aladdin (1992 film)	4:04

Note

- Some versions of the compilation omit "The World Is Stone".

=== Australian version ===
No.	Title	Writer(s)	Origin	Length
1.	"The Golden Boy" (Freddie Mercury & Montserrat Caballé)	Rice; Mercury; Moran	Barcelona (1988 album)	5:10
2.	"Oh What a Circus" (David Essex)	Rice; Lloyd Webber	Evita (1978 musical)	3:50
3.	"I Know Him So Well" (Elaine Paige & Barbara Dickson)	Rice; Andersson; Ulvaeus	Chess (1984 concept album / album musical)	4:14
4.	"Don't Cry for Me Argentina" (Julie Covington)	Rice; Lloyd Webber	Evita	5:25
5.	"Everything's Alright" (Kate Ceberano, John Farnham & Jon Stevens)	Rice; Lloyd Webber	Jesus Christ Superstar ('92 Australian Cast) (1992 touring concert)	4:48
6.	"The Last Supper" (John Farnham & Jon Stevens)	Rice; Lloyd Webber	Jesus Christ Superstar ('92 Australian Cast)	7:05
7.	"Ziggy" (Celine Dion)	Rice (English lyrics); Berger; Plamondon	Tycoon (1992 musical; English version of French rock opera Starmania)	2:56
8.	"All Time High" (Rita Coolidge)	Rice; Barry	Octopussy (1983 theme song to the James Bond film)	2:58
9.	"One Night in Bangkok" (Murray Head)	Rice; Andersson; Ulvaeus	Chess	5:01
10.	"Another Suitcase in Another Hall" (Barbara Dickson)	Rice; Lloyd Webber	Evita	3:00
11.	"Any Dream Will Do" (Jason Donovan)	Rice; Lloyd Webber	Joseph and the Amazing Technicolor Dreamcoat (1991 musical)	3:51
12.	"The Second Time" (Elaine Paige)	Rice; Lai	Elaine Paige (1981 album)	4:07
13.	"The Least of My Troubles" (Paul Nicholas)	Rice; Oliver	Blondel (1983 rock opera)	3:57
14.	"Close Every Door" (David Dixon)	Rice; Lloyd Webber	Joseph and the Amazing Technicolor Dreamcoat (1992 musical)	3:01
15.	"Song of the King" (David Daltrey & The Mixed Bag featuring Tim Rice)	Rice; Lloyd Webber	Joseph and the Amazing Technicolor Dreamcoat (1968 musical)	2:56
16.	"A Winter's Tale" (David Essex)	Rice; Batt	(1982 single; later included on the David Essex album The Whisper)	4:10
17.	"The Legal Boys" (Elton John)	Rice; John	Jump Up! (1982 Elton John album)	3:06
18.	"Superstar" (Murray Head)	Rice; Lloyd Webber	(1969 single; later included in Jesus Christ Superstar musical)	4:16
19.	"A Whole New World (Aladdin's Theme)" (Peabo Bryson & Regina Belle)	Rice; Menken	Aladdin (1992 film)	4:04

== Personnel ==
Adapted from the album's liner notes.

Producers

- Tim Rice – "I Know Him So Well", "Don't Cry for Me Argentina", "Everything's Alright" / "I Don't Know How to Love Him", "One Night in Bangkok", "The Second Time", "The Least of My Troubles", "Song of the King", "Superstar"
- Andrew Lloyd Webber – "Don't Cry for Me Argentina", "Everything's Alright" / "I Don't Know How to Love Him", "Another Suitcase in Another Hall", "Superstar"
- David Land – "Don't Cry for Me Argentina"
- Freddie Mercury, Mike Moran & David Richards – "The Golden Boy"
- Mike Batt – "Oh What a Circus", "A Winter's Tale"
- Benny Andersson & Björn Ulvaeus – "I Know Him So Well", "One Night in Bangkok"
- Jannick Top & Serge Perathoner – "Ziggy"
- Stephen Short, Phil Ramone – "All Time High"
- Cyndi Lauper – The World Is Stone
- Nigel Wright – "Any Dream Will Do", "Close Every Door"
- Andrew Powell – "The Second Time"
- Stephen Oliver – "The Least of My Troubles"
- Norrie Paramor – "Song of the King"
- Chris Thomas – "The Legal Boys"
- Michel Berger – "Only the Very Best"
- Walter Afanasieff – "A Whole New World (Aladdin's Theme)"
- David Hirschfelder – "Everything's Alright", "The Last Supper" [both Australian version only]

Additional personnel

- Justin Pressland – album coordinator

== Charts ==
Chart performance for I Know Them So Well – The Best of Tim Rice
Chart (1994)	Peak position
UK Compilation Chart	2

== Certifications ==
Region	Certification	Certified units/sales
United Kingdom (BPI)	Gold	100,000^{^}
^{^} Shipments figures based on certification alone.
