= Maurane =

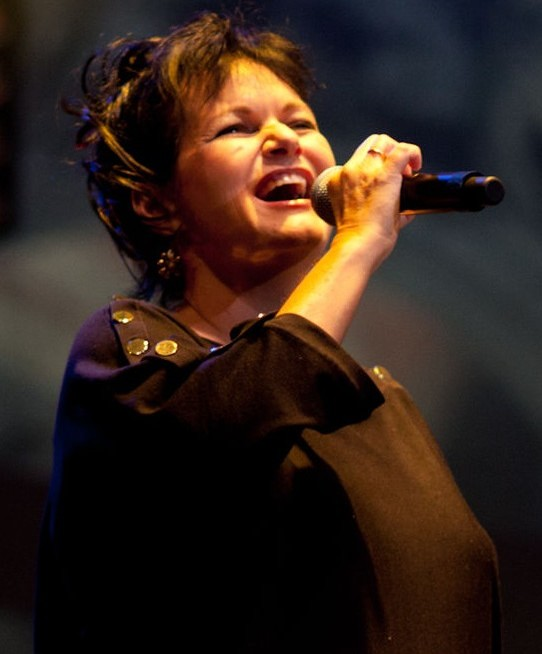
- Maurane performing in 2011

Background information
- Also known as: Claudie Claude, Claude Maurane
- Born: Claudine Luypaerts; 12 November 1960; Ixelles, Belgium
- Died: 7 May 2018 (aged 57) Schaerbeek, Belgium
- Genres: Chanson; jazz; blues
- Occupations: Singer, actress
- Years active: 1979–2018
- Labels: Saravah; Polydor

Claudine Luypaerts, better known as Maurane (pronounced [moʁan]; 12 November 1960 – 7 May 2018), was a Francophone Belgian singer and actress.

Brought to light in the 1980s with her role as Marie-Jeanne in the second version of the rock opera Starmania, her best-known titles are "Toutes les mamas", "Sur un prélude de Bach" and "Tu es mon autre" (in a duet with Lara Fabian). She was regularly referred to as a "golden voice of francophone song," or having a "velvet voice."

== Biography ==
=== 1960–1976: Early life and musical education ===
Claudine Luypaerts was born on 12 November 1960 in Ixelles, Brussels, to Guy-Philippe Luypaerts, a composer and director of Académie de Musique of Verviers, and Jeannie Patureaux, a piano teacher. When she was young, she studied the violin for a while, but was put off by all forms of schooling and began to learn to sing and play the piano on her own, before preferring the guitar.

In 1976, she was second in the Visa competition for the show and, the following year, took part in the Lundis d'Hortense, for which she adopted the stage name "Claudie Claude".

=== 1979–1988: Beginnings, Danser and Starmania ===
In 1979, Maurane took part in the show Brel en mille temps, with Philippe Lafontaine, where she was discovered by the French songwriter Pierre Barouh. Founder of the Saravah label, he produced her first singles which were released starting in 1980 under the pseudonym "Claude Maurane". The latter is a reference to the director Francis Morane who worked on Starmania. However, it is spelled slightly differently in order to avoid confusion with the Bob Morane comic strip, even though she is sometimes credited under this spelling. (Note: For instance, in 1984, for her contribution to Jo Lemaire's eponymous album: Jo Lemaire at Discogs)

The first singles - "J'me roule en boule" (1980), "Fais soleil" (1982), "T'as pas la pêche" (1984), "Moi l'argent, toi jeune" (1985) - did not meet with much success. She later got a string of small contracts, singing in the street or in cafés and to be a backing singer, notably for Viktor Lazlo, Jo Lemaire or Philippe Lafontaine.

Her career only really took off in 1983 when she first performed at the Sentier des Halles in Paris. The show's success allowed her to record her first album, Danser, produced by Saravah, Éditions 23 and Franc'Amour, which was released in 1986.

In 1988, Michel Berger cast her in the role of Marie-Jeanne, created in 1978 by Fabienne Thibeault. She sang in the second version of the rock opera Starmania, which toured for six months with Renaud Hantson, Sabrina Lory, Wenta, Martine St. Clair, Peter Lorne and the brothers Norman and Richard Groulx. Performing this role at the same time as her singing career proved to be difficult for her, leading her to suddenly stop performing in the rock opera. She was replaced by Réjane Perry for the rest of the tour.

=== 1989–1994: Maurane, Ami ou ennemi and Olympia live dates ===
Her second album, Maurane, was released in 1989 on Polydor and proved to be a success, selling 150,000 copies. The album contains one of her most popular songsː "Toutes les mamas," and its success led her to perform at the Olympia then on an international tour that ended in Japan. In July 1989, Maurane was awarded both the Radio France Internationale's female Octave, and the Festival d'été de Québec award.

In 1991, the Ami ou ennemi album was released, continuing the previous success and selling very well over time – nearly 450,000 copies were sold – thanks to titles such as "Ça casse," "Du mal," "Mentir" and particularly Jean-Claude Vannier's "Sur un prélude de Bach," which would have a resounding impact on her career. The album also includes a song about her connection to the character she played in Starmania: "Qui es-tu Marie-Jeanne?"

She played a second time at the Olympia in May 1992, then toured Europe in Autumn 1992 and March–April 1993. She also performed a few festival dates, such as the Printemps de Bourges in April and the Francofolies in July 1993. Following these series of concerts, a live album entitled Une fille très scène, recorded at the Olympia in August 1993, was released in April 1994.

In 1994, Maurane received the Francophone Artist of the Year award at the Victoires de la musique, beating Céline Dion and Stephan Eicher. She had previously been nominated for the Female Artist of the Year award at the 1992 Victoires, but lost to Jane Birkin.

=== 1995–1998: Différente, L'un pour l'autre and charitable commitment ===
In November 1995, Maurane released Différente, her fourth studio album, with Philippe Lafontaine and Jean-Claude Vannier still by her side. This release was followed by a concert tour created in collaboration with pianist Arnould Massart and the Guildhall String Ensemble.

Appreciated by her fellow artists, she was regularly solicited for charitable acts and, since 1993, had been involved in the fight against AIDS with Francis Cabrel, Michel Jonasz, Catherine Lara, Maxime Le Forestier and Alain Souchon. The group of artists gave a concert at the Olympia to raise funds for the Sol En Si ("Solidarité Enfants Sida") association and a live album was released. Four years later, they were joined by Zazie. Over time, various live and studio albums would be released and the band grew larger in size. Between 1996 and 2013, on fourteen occasions, Maurane also participated in the Enfoirés concerts supporting the Restos du cœur before leaving the troupe in 2015, due to a lack of motivation.

In 1998, she released L'un pour l'autre, a 'best-of' compilation, including five new tracks, whose title song earned her, and songwriter Peter Lorne, the 1998 Oscar de la chanson française.

=== 2000–2008: Toi du monde, Quand l'humain danse and Si aujourd'hui ===
At the dawn of the new century, Maurane began writing a new album. After working with several collaborators, she would finally end up with a trustworthy team, composed of Tomàs Gubitsch, Jean Dindinaud and Nicolas Repac. These three would help her in dealing with her father's death in 1999, and support her through the making of Toi du monde, her fifth album, released in August 2000. This release turned out darker than usual for Maurane, and was influenced by world music.

In 2003, the album Quand l'humain danse was released, a very personal album involving songwriters such as Jean-Jacques Goldman, Daniel Lavoie, Louise Forestier, Gildas Arzel and Jean-Claude Vannier and featuring duets with Marc Lavoine ("Un pays mais"), Lara Fabian ("Mais la vie") and Véronique Sanson ("Petites minutes cannibales"), all written by Peter Lorne. In 2004, a new live album, L'heureux tour, transcribed the tour that followed.

In January 2007, Maurane released Si aujourd'hui, which did not meet with the success of her previous works. In June of the same year, her autobiography was published, titled "La Vie en Rouge", co-written with journalist Thierry Coljon.

=== 2009–2014: Nougaro ou l'espérance en l'homme, Fais-moi une fleur and Ouvre ===
In January 2008, she recorded "The Baltimore Project" with Jacques Higelin, Riké and the group Sweet Air, in support of hostages around the world, including Íngrid Betancourt. In September 2009, as a tribute to her friend Claude Nougaro, who would have turned 80, she released a cover album entitled Nougaro ou l'espérance en l'homme. Just as her Nougaro tribute was releasing, she spent six days with Gil Goldstein and Jay Newland in New York to record her jazz-influenced Fais-moi une fleur record, released in September 2011.

From November 2012 to February 2013, then from October 2013 to February 2014, she was a member of the jury of the French TV talent show Nouvelle Star on D8 alongside André Manoukian, Sinclair and Olivier Bas.

In September 2014, the song "Trop Forte" was released, written by Pierre-Yves Lebert and Daran about the mental difficulties of being overweight, a theme that Maurane had never dared to address until then. This was the first single from her album Ouvre, released in November 2014. A series of other personal subjects were also tackled on the album, such as an open letter for her daughter on "Je voudrais tout te dire."

=== 2016–2018: Later life and death, Brel ===
In 2016, she suffered from health issues and had to undergo an operation for oedema of the vocal cords, forcing her to cancel her concerts and keep her away from the stage until 2018.

In March 2018, the singer announced, via a video recorded in the offices of her label Polydor and posted on social networks, that her next album would be a Jacques Brel tribute album, explaining she had "been dreaming about it for 15 years, 20 years". On 3 May 2018, she covered Brel's "La chanson des vieux amants" at the Inc'Rock Festival, as a duet with Typh Barrow. This performance was repeated on 6 May 2018, during the Iris Festival, alongside twenty or so artists, all of them celebrating Jacques Brel. Less than twenty-four hours after her last public appearance, Maurane was found dead in Schaerbeek.

On 7 May 2018, Maurane was found dead beside her bath at her home in Schaerbeek in the area of Brussels, Belgium. The following day, the magistrate of the Brussels public prosecutor's office confirmed the opening of a judicial inquiry, although the death of the singer was not considered as suspect. One month later, on 15 June 2018, the public prosecutor's office closed the case for lack of evidence of criminality, declaring that the singer's death was accidental and stating that "no further comments or details will be communicated". On 15 July, Maurane's daughter succinctly explained to Le Parisien that her mother had fallen.

Her funeral was held on 17 May 2018 in the church of Notre-Dame-des-Grâces in Woluwe-Saint-Pierre, a municipality in the Brussels region, and was followed by her burial in the cemetery of Auderghem, another municipality in the Belgian capital region where Maurane lived as a child. Hundreds of people came to pay their respects, as well as many artists who had travelled from France, such as Muriel Robin, Lara Fabian, Maxime Le Forestier, Zazie, Pascal Obispo, Michel Fugain, Francis Cabrel and Philip Catherine.

On 12 October 2018, her album Brel, finished, post-mortem, by Maurane's daughter and her pianist Philippe Decok, was released. The album is certified gold in Belgium.

== Musical style ==
Throughout her career, she performed duets with various artists such as Catherine Lara ("La Langue des Anges," in 1991), Michel Fugain (three live duets at the 1996 Francofolies de La Rochelle), Eddy Mitchell, who wrote "C'est magique" in 1998 and Lara Fabian ("Tu es mon autre," in 2001). The singer also released two albums in trio with Steve Houben and Charles Loos under the name HLM (Houben, Loos, Maurane) in 1986 and 2005.

== Personal life ==
On 29 December 1993, Maurane and singer Pablo Villafranca, whom she married in June 1992, became parents of a daughter, Lou. Despite their separation, Villafranca still sang as a backing vocalist on her 1995 album Différente. He also appeared in the music video for the song "Sur un prélude de Bach" and participated in the TV promo for the song "Désillusionniste."

== Awards and distinctions ==
=== Awards ===
- 1983 : Best Song Award at the Festival de Spa for "Petite chanson sans problème"
- 1986 : Rapsat-Lelièvre award
- 1989 : RFi Octave award
- 1989 : Festival d'été de Québec award
- 1994 : Victoire de la musique, "Francophone Artist of the Year" category
- 1998 : Oscar de la chanson française (with Peter Lorne, songwriter) for "L'un pour l'autre"

=== Distinctions ===
- 2001: Chevalier de l'ordre des Arts et des Lettres (France)
- 2003: Knight of the Order of the Crown (Belgium)
- 2011: Officier de l'ordre des Arts et des Lettres (France)

=== Tributes ===
- In 1987, Belgian poet Philippe Nowaczyk honours Maurane in his poem Signe particulier : chanteuse jazzy, published in his À bout portant collection.
- At the time of Maurane's death, the municipal college of Schaerbeek decided to rename the square in rue Jacques Rayé as "Square Maurane." She used to live at 32 rue Jacques Rayé in the Brussels municipality.
- She was also paid a tribute at the 2019 Enfoirés show.

== Discography ==
=== Albums ===
- 1986 : Danser – HLM
- 1988 : Starmania (Rôle de Marie-Jeanne)
- 1989 : Maurane (100 000 copies selling – Gold Disc in France)
- 1991 : Ami ou ennemi (300 000 copies selling – Platinum Disc in France)
- 1994 : Une fille très scène
- 1996 : Différente – Les années Saravah (100 000 copies selling – Gold Disc in France)
- 1998 : L'un pour l'autre (300 000 copies selling – Platinum Disc in France)
- 1999 : Collection master série – Maurane à l'Olympia
- 2000 : Toi du monde (50 000 copies selling)
- 2003 : Quand l'humain danse (200 000 copies selling – Gold Disc in Belgium & Double Gold Disc in France))
- 2005 : Un ange passe (as part of the HLM trio)
- 2007 : Si aujourd'hui (100 000 copies selling – Platinum Disc in Belgium & Gold Disc in France)
- 2009 : Nougaro, ou l'esperance en l'homme (130 000 copies selling – Platinum Disc in France)
- 2014 : Ouvre
- 2018 : Brel

=== Singles ===
- 1986 : "Danser"
- 1988 : "Les uns contre les autres – Toutes les mamas"
- 1989 : "Tout pour un seul homme – Pas gaie la pagaille"
- 1990 : "Où es-tu?"
- 1991 : "Du mal – Mentir"
- 1992 : "Sur un prélude de Bach" – "Ami ou ennemi" – "Qui es-tu Marie-Jeanne?"
- 1993 : "Ça casse – Décidément"
- 1994 : "Boum!" (en concert)
- 1996 : "Différente quand je chante" – "Le paradis c'est l'enfer" – "Juste une petite fille"
- 1997 : "Tout va bien dans ce monde"
- 1998 : "L'un pour l'autre" – "Les yeux fermés"
- 1999 : "Désillusionniste" – "Chanson de l'autruche" (Émilie Jolie) – "La chanson des vieux amants" (en concert)
- 2000 : "Pour les âmes, pour les hommes" – "Qui à part nous?" – "Il neige des e-mails"
- 2001 : "Toi du monde"
- 2002 : "Tu es mon autre" (with Lara Fabian, nominated to Victoires de la Musique)
- 2003 : "Tout faux" – "Quand les sangs"
- 2004 : "Des millions de fois"
- 2014 : "Trop forte"
- 2015 : "Sous ces yeux-là"

== Filmography ==
- 1987 : Carnaval by Ronny Coutteure (TV) : Marina
- 1998 : Le comptoir by Sophie Tatischeff : Joëlle
- 2005 : Palais royal! by Valérie Lemercier : herself
- 2010 : My Afternoons with Margueritte by Jean Becker : Francine
- 2014 : Get Well Soon by Jean Becker : Françoise
- 2018 : Le Collier rouge by Jean Becker : the boss

== Publications ==
- Maurane; Coljon, Thierry (2007). La vie en rouge : Autobiographie sereine. Brussels: Editions Luc Pire. ISBN 978-2-35425-010-2. OCLC 152505419.
- Maurane; Andrieu-Millagou, Caroline (2015). Trop forte!. Neuilly-sur-Seine: Michel Lafon. ISBN 978-2-7499-2472-4. OCLC 904493473.
