= Le monde est stone =

1978 song written by Michel Berger and Luc Plamondon

"Le monde est stone" (lit. 'the world is stone') is a song written and produced by Michel Berger and Luc Plamondon for the 1978 Canadian-French musical Starmania. It was originally performed by Fabienne Thibeault and released on the Starmania album in 1978. Canadian singer Celine Dion recorded "Le monde est stone" for her 1991 album, Dion chante Plamondon. The English-language version with lyrics by Tim Rice, titled "The World Is Stone", was recorded by American singer Cyndi Lauper and released on the Tycoon album in 1992.

== Cyndi Lauper version ==
"The World Is Stone"

Single by Cyndi Lauper

from the album Tycoon
- B-side: "Learn to Live Alone"
- Released: 25 May 1992
- Studio: The Hit Factory (New York City)
- Length: 4:24
- Label: Epic
- Songwriters: Michel Berger; Luc Plamondon; Tim Rice
- Producer: Cyndi Lauper

Cyndi Lauper singles chronology
"Unconditional Love" (1991)	"The World Is Stone" (1992)	"Who Let In the Rain" (1993)

Cyndi Lauper recorded the English version of "Le monde est stone", titled "The World Is Stone", for the Tycoon album in 1992. "Le monde est stone" has been associated with Fabienne Thibeault, Marie Carmen, Celine Dion, and Maurane. The song was composed by Michel Berger, with original French lyrics by Luc Plamondon and English lyrics by Tim Rice.

Although the single was not released in the United States, it became successful in several European countries, particularly in France, where it reached number two, remained in the top five for three months, and spent 31 weeks in the top 50. The B-side of the single was "Learn to Live Alone" (the English version of "Les uns contre les autres"), which also appeared on Tycoon. The single sold 250,000 copies in France.

=== Critical reception ===
Upon its release, Jon Wilde of Melody Maker described "The World Is Stone" as "the kind of muzak ballad that would give seasick a bad name".

=== Track listings ===
- UK CD1 and Australian CD single
1. "The World Is Stone" – 4:24
2. "Learn to Live Alone" – 5:08
3. "Time After Time" – 3:59
- UK CD2
1. "The World Is Stone" – 4:24
2. "I Drove All Night" – 4:08
3. "What's Going On" – 3:51
- European 7-inch, CD, and cassette single
1. "The World Is Stone" – 4:24
2. "Learn to Live Alone" – 5:08

=== Personnel ===
Personnel are adapted from the UK CD1 disc notes.

- Michel Berger – writing
- Luc Plamondon – writing
- Tim Rice – writing
- Cyndi Lauper – vocals, production, arrangement
- Peter Wood – arrangement
- Frank Filipetti – mixing
- Guy Gray – recording

=== Charts ===
==== Weekly charts ====
Weekly chart performance
Chart (1992)	Peak position
Australia (ARIA)	106
Belgium (Ultratop 50 Flanders)	41
Europe (Eurochart Hot 100)	13
France (SNEP)	2
Germany (GfK)	100
Ireland (IRMA)	16
UK Singles (Official Charts)	15
UK Airplay (Music Week)	14

==== Year-end charts ====
Year-end chart performance
Chart (1992)	Position
Europe (Eurochart Hot 100)	55

=== Certifications ===
Certifications
Region	Certification	Certified units/sales
France (SNEP)	Gold	250,000^{*}
^{*} Sales figures based on certification alone.

=== Release history ===
Release history
Region	Date	Format	Label	Ref.
United Kingdom	25 May 1992	7-inch vinyl; cassette; CD	Epic	
Australia	29 June 1992	Cassette; CD	Epic	
