= Martine St. Clair =

Canadian singer (born 1960)

Martine St-Clair
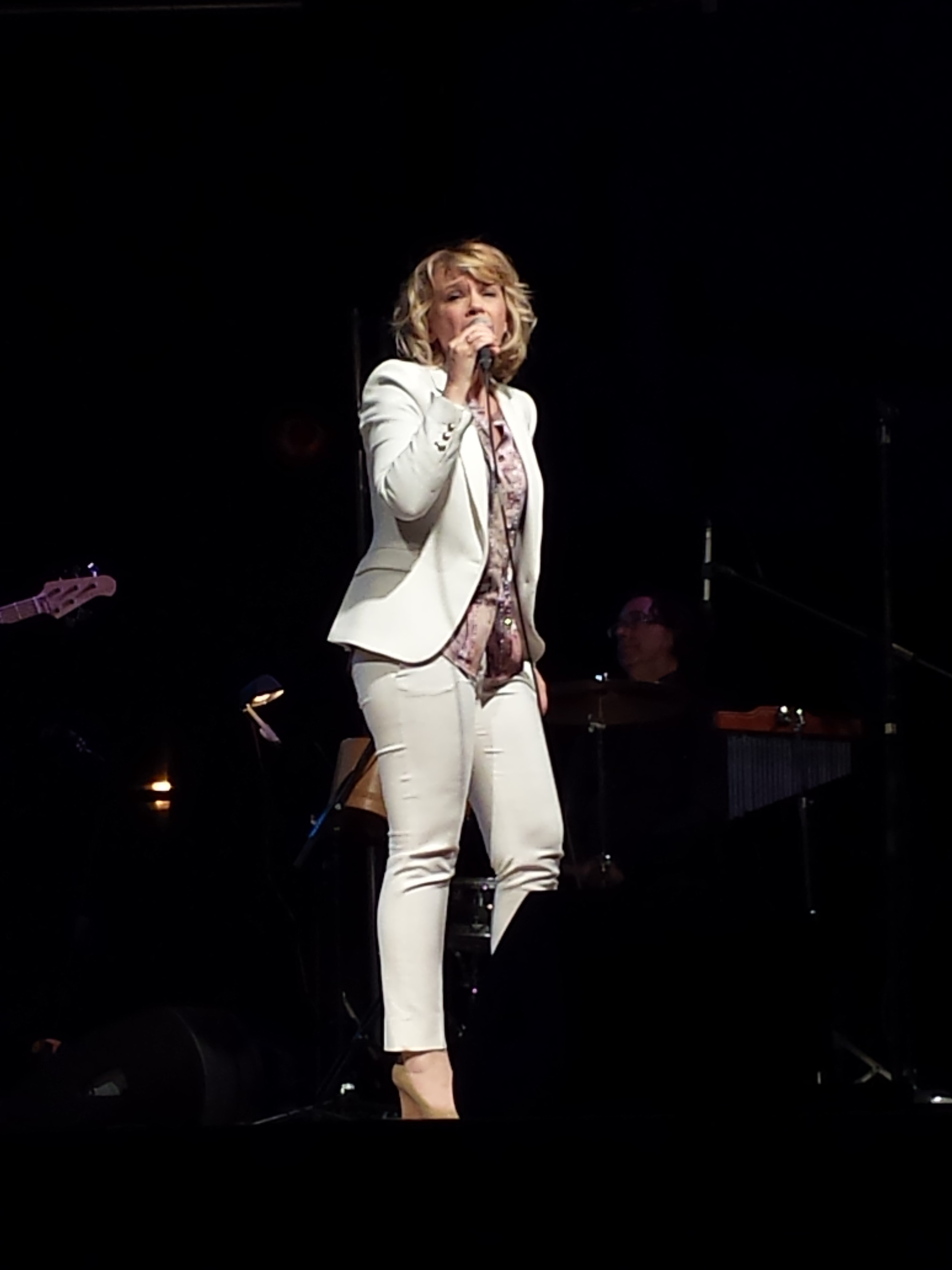
- St-Clair performing in 2015
- Born: Martine Nault; 22 July 1962 (age 64); Montreal, Quebec, Canada
- Occupation: Singer
- Musical career
- Genre: Pop
- Years active: 1980s–present

Martine St. Clair (born Martine Nault, 22 July 1962) is a Canadian singer from the province of Quebec. She has released numerous albums in a career that has spanned over two decades.

St. Clair was born in Montreal. In 1981, she was chosen by renowned Quebec lyricist Luc Plamondon to play the role of Cristal in the rock-opera Starmania. The following year, she recorded a duet with French singer Gilbert Bécaud called "L'amour est mort".

Her debut solo album in 1983, Coeur ordinateur, features songs written by Plamondon.

She also recorded several duets or collaborated with other recording artists. She recorded the song "Closer Together" with Canadian new wave group The Box in 1986. In 1987, she recorded "Je l'aime" with Nicole Martin and "Tu peux pas" with Claude Dubois. In 1993, she recorded two cover versions of Canadian singer Gino Vannelli's 1979 song "Wheels of Life": one in French as "L'amour est loi", and the second in English as a duet with Vannelli himself. Her musicians have included guitarist Alexis Charrier and pianist Sonny Lamson.

She received nominations for Female Vocalist of the Year and for Best Selling Single ("L'amour est dans tes yeux") at the 1986 Juno Awards. The same year she won 4 Felix awards.

== Discography ==
=== Albums ===
- 1980 Starmania Made in Quebec
- 1983 Coeur ordinateur
- 1984 Il y a l'amour dans l'air
- 1985 Ce soir l'amour est dans tes yeux
- 1985 De Starmania à aujourd'hui (compilation)
- 1987 Au coeur du désert
- 1987 Mes plus belles chansons (compilation)
- 1988 Martine St-Clair
- 1988 Starmania 88
- 1990 Caribou
- 1993 Un souffle de tendresse
- 1996 Un long chemin
- 2001 Un bonheur fou
- 2004 Tout ce que j'ai
- 2009 Entre vous et moi (compilation double CD)

=== Singles ===
- 1981 "L'amour est mort" (duet with Gilbert Bécaud)
- 1982 "Pleure ma petite soeur" (Luc Plamondon – Angelo Finaldi)
- 1983 "Le fils de Superman" (Luc Plamondon – Germain Gauthier)
- 1983 "Un homme sentimental" (Luc Plamondon – Germain Gauthier)
- 1984 "Il y a de l'amour dans l'air" (Claude-Michel Schönberg)
- 1984 "Ohé ohé" (duet with Normand Brathwaite)
- 1985 "On va s'aimer" (Didier Barbelivien – Gilbert Montagné)
- 1985 "Simplement"
- 1985 "Je l'aime" (duet with Nicole Martin)
- 1986 "Ce soir l'amour est dans tes yeux" (Claude-Michel Schönberg)
- 1986 "Dis-moi de revenir"
- 1986 "Heureuse sans être amoureuse"
- 1986 "Plus près des étoiles"
- 1986 "Quand je tombe en amour"
- 1988 "Au coeur du désert"
- 1988 "Danse avec moi"
- 1988 "Monte, monte" (Martine St-Clair – J.-V. Fournier – Jean-Alain Roussel)
- 1989 "Folle de vous" (Claude-Michel Schönberg)
- 1989 "Tous les juke-box" (Luc Plamondon – René Grignon)
- 1990 "Désir égale danger" (Luc Plamondon – Franck Langolf)
- 1990 "Lavez lavez" (P. Grillet/M. Lavoine – P. Stive/F. Aboulker)
- 1990 "Je ne sais plus comment j'm'appelle" (P. Grillet/M. Lavoine – P. Stive/F. Aboulker)
- 1991 "Je veux vous embrasser"
- 1991 "Seulement pour toujours"
- 1993 "L'amour est loi" (duet with Gino Vannelli)
- 1996 "Un long chemin"
- 1996 "Usure des jours"
- 2001 "Un jour"
- 2002 "Débranche"
- 2005 "Rien dans les mains"
- 2005 "Stay"
- 2005 "Amoureux fou"
- 2006 "Mon amour, mon ami"
- 2006 "Djé oné bwaba (Lavez lavez 2006)"
- 2009 "Qui pourrait t'aimer mieux que moi"
