= Any Dream Will Do =

Any Dream Will Do may refer to:

- "Any Dream Will Do" (song), from the musical Joseph and the Amazing Technicolor Dreamcoat, written by Andrew Lloyd Webber and Tim Rice
- Any Dream Will Do (TV series), BBC television series that searched for a new, unknown lead to play Joseph in a West End revival of the musical Joseph and the Amazing Technicolor Dreamcoat
- Any Dream Will Do – The Best of Tim Rice, compilation album by Tim Rice, also released as I Know Them So Well – The Best of Tim Rice
