= Just Around the Corner =

Just Around the Corner may refer to:

- Just Around the Corner, a 1921 American silent drama film
- Just Around the Corner, a 1938 American musical comedy film
- "Just Around the Corner", a 1987 song by Cock Robin
- "Just Around the Corner", a 2025 song by Beach Bunny
