= Un garçon pas comme les autres =

Song from 1978 rock opera Starmania

"Un garçon pas comme les autres" (lit. 'A boy unlike any other') is a song written and produced by Michel Berger and Luc Plamondon for the 1978 rock opera Starmania. It was first performed by Fabienne Thibeault and issued on the Starmania album in 1978. Canadian singer Celine Dion recorded the song for her 1991 album Dion chante Plamondon. In 1992, she also recorded an English-language version, "Ziggy", with lyrics by Tim Rice, released on the Tycoon album. Dion issued both versions on a two-track single in France in 1993, which reached number two on the chart and was certified gold.

== Celine Dion version ==
"Ziggy"

Single by Celine Dion

from the album Dion chante Plamondon
- Language: French
- B-side: "Un garçon pas comme les autres"
- Released: June 1993
- Recorded: 8 September – 6 October 1991
- Studio: Face B (Paris)
- Genre: Pop
- Length: 2:56
- Label: Epic
- Songwriters: Luc Plamondon; Michel Berger
- Producers: Jannick Top; Serge Perathoner

Celine Dion singles chronology
"Water from the Moon" (1993)	"Ziggy" (1993)	"When I Fall in Love" (1993)

Music video
- "Un garçon pas comme les autres (Ziggy)" on YouTube

In 1991, Celine Dion recorded the 1978 Starmania song "Un garçon pas comme les autres" for her tenth studio album, Dion chante Plamondon. Produced by Jannick Top and Serge Perathoner, it appeared as "Un garçon pas comme les autres (Ziggy)". In 1992, she recorded an English-language version with lyrics by Tim Rice, titled "Ziggy", for the Tycoon album. This version was produced by Michel Berger. Dion released both recordings on a two-track single in France in June 1993. The song presents a narrative about a woman's unrequited love for a gay man. Dion performed it regularly in concert, and in 2005 it was included on her greatest hits album On ne change pas.

=== Commercial performance ===
"Ziggy" reached number two in France and was certified gold. It remained on the chart for almost a year, including seven weeks at number two and 18 weeks in the top 10. It became Dion's most successful single in France at that time. The song also reached number 55 on the European Hot 100 Singles chart.

=== Music video ===
Two similar music videos were filmed for the French and English versions on 27 April 1993, both directed by Lewis Furey. They show Dion sitting in stadium bleachers, longing for a football player who is focused on his teammates. At the end, he approaches a person in a hooded pullover; when the hood is removed during a kiss, it is revealed to be Dion. The model in the video is Rodney Weber. In 2005, the video was included on Dion's greatest hits DVD collection On ne change pas.

=== Formats and track listing ===
- French cassette and CD single
1. "Ziggy" – 2:56
2. "Un garçon pas comme les autres" – 2:56

=== Charts ===
Chart performance
Chart (1993)	Peak position
European Hot 100 Singles (Music & Media)	55
France (SNEP)	2

=== Certifications ===
Certifications
Region	Certification	Certified units/sales
France (SNEP)	Gold	250,000^{*}
^{*} Sales figures based on certification alone.

=== Release history ===
Release history
Region	Date	Format	Label	Ref.
France	June 1993	Cassette; CD	Epic	
