= Fleurs d'amour, fleurs d'amitié =

- Presented by: Nanette Workman; Tony Roman
- Country of origin: Canada
- Original language: French
- No. of seasons: 1

Production
- Running time: 30 minutes

Original release
- Network: Radio-Canada
- Release: 16 June – 22 September 1968

Fleurs d'amour, fleurs d'amitié is a Canadian variety television series which aired on Radio-Canada in 1968.

== Premise ==
Hosts Nanette Workman (credited as Nanette) and Tony Roman hosted this psychedelic variety series on location from the Expo 67 grounds. The hosts were publicly dubbed "Québec's Sonny & Cher".

== Scheduling ==
The half-hour series aired Sunday mornings from 16 June to 22 September 1968.
