= Renaud Hantson =

French musician

Renaud Hantson (29 March 1963) is a French singer, musician, drummer, actor and writer. Besides his solo career, he has been part of hard rock and rock bands like Satan Jokers and Furious Zoo.

== Musicals ==
He has also taken part in various rock operas by Michel Berger and Luc Plamondon.

- 1988: Starmania - role of Ziggy (on stage and on Starmania album / role of Johnny Rockfort (only on stage))
- 1990: La Légende de Jimmy two roles, as James Dean and a teenager
- 1993: Les Enfoirés chantent Starmania - particularly in the song "Ziggy"
- 1999 to 2001: Notre Dame de Paris - Gringoire

== Discography ==
=== Albums ===
- 1987: Ne plus dire qu'on est seul (Vogue)
- 1988: Briseur de cœurs (Vogue)
- 1990: Petit Homme (Vogue)
- 1992: A·M·O·U·R (Tréma)
- 1994: Des plaies et des bosses (Tréma)
- 1997: Seulement humain (Tréma)
- 2002: Renaud Hantson (Universal)
- 2008: Je couche avec moi (XIII Bis Records)
- 2009: Best of (XIII Bis Records)
- 2011: Opéra Rock (Rebel Music)(cover+remix)
- 2012: La Fissure du temps (Rebel Music)
- 2013: Tout recommencer (Rebel Music)

as part of Furious Zoo

- 1992: Furioso
- 2005: Furioso II
- 2006: Furioso III
- 2008: Furioso IV
- 2010: Furioso V: A.nal O.riented R.ock
- 2012: Wock n' Woll
- 2014: Back to Blues Rock

as part of Satan Jokers

- 1983: Les fils du metal
- 1984: Trop fou pour toi
- 1985: III
- 2006: Best of Live
- 2008: Hardcore Collectors
- 2009: SJ 2009
- 2009: Fetish X
- 2011: AddictionS
- 2013: Psychiatric
- 2014: sex opera

=== Singles ===
- 1987: "Y'a pas d'mystères"
- 1987: "Ne plus dire qu'on est seul"
- 1988: "Voyeur"
- 1988: "C'est du sirop"
- 1990: "Petit homme"
- 1990: "Tuer la guerre"
- 1992: "A·M·O·U·R"
- 1992: "Ça ne suffit pas toujours"
- 1992: "Il faut donner"
- 1994: "Apprendre à vivre sans toi"
- 1994: "Quatre saisons" (with France Gall)
- 1994: "Si tu te bas"
- 1997: "En partance"
- 1997: "Seulement humain"
- 1997: "Féminin singulier"
- 2002: "Je perds le sud"
- 2002: "Lise et Laure"
- 2008: "Le Feu aux yeux"
- 2008: "Écoute le silence"
- 2011: "Quand on arrive en ville"
- 2011: "Can You Feel the Love Tonight"
- 2011: "Out Here on My Own"
- 2012: "Je t'aime ainsi"
- 2013: "Poudre aux yeux"
- 2013: "Un pas vers le ciel"
