= Brel =

Brel may refer to:

- Andrew Brel (born Andreas Broulidakis 28 September 1960), UK music producer
- Jacques Brel (1929–1978), French-speaking Belgian singer
- Daniel Brel (b. 1950), French accordionist
- British Rail Engineering Limited (BREL, 1969–1989), defunct railway systems engineering company
