= Cock Robin (album) =

Studio album by Cock Robin
- Released: 1985
- Recorded: 1984−1985
- Studio: Record Plant, Los Angeles; Summa Studios, Los Angeles; Redwing Studios, Tarzana; Artisan Sound Recorders, Los Angeles
- Genre: Soft rock; new wave
- Label: Columbia
- Producer: Steve Hillage

Cock Robin chronology
Cock Robin (1985)	After Here Through Midland (1987)

Singles from Cock Robin
- 1. "When Your Heart Is Weak" Released: 1985; 2. "Thought You Were on My Side" Released: 1985; 3. "The Promise You Made" Released: 1986; 4. "Once We Might Have Known" Released: 1986

Cock Robin is the first album by American band Cock Robin and was released in 1985.

It was a Top 10 hit album in numerous European countries whereas it charted only at #61 in the United States Top 75. The singles "When Your Heart Is Weak" and "The Promise You Made" met with the most success in Europe, and still get regular airplay on adult contemporary and pop music stations in countries like France, Italy, Belgium and the Netherlands.

The music video to "When Your Heart Is Weak" was directed by Chris Gabrin, and filmed in the California desert Joshua Tree National Park (home of former band guitarist Clive Wright) in May 1985.

== Track listing ==
Side one
No.	Title	Length
1.	"Thought You Were On My Side"	4:17
2.	"When Your Heart Is Weak"	4:40
3.	"Just When You're Having Fun"	3:43
4.	"The Promise You Made"	3:55
5.	"Because It Keeps On Working"	4:40

Side two
No.	Title	Length
6.	"Born With Teeth"	4:15
7.	"Once We Might Have Known"	5:10
8.	"More Than Willing"	4:29
9.	"A Little Innocence"	5:36

Bonus Tracks - Single Versions and Non-Album B-Sides (2014 Expanded Edition)
No.	Title	Length
10.	"When Your Heart Is Weak (Single Mix)"	4:31
11.	"Have You Any Sympathy? (B-side to "The Promise You Made")"	4:17
12.	"Peace On Earth (B-side to "Thought You Were On My Side" and "When Your Heart Is Weak")"	2:55
13.	"Once We Might Have Known (Remix)"	4:13

Bonus Tracks - Remixes and Alternate Versions (2014 Expanded Edition)
No.	Title	Length
14.	"When Your Heart Is Weak (Dance Mix)"	6:34
15.	"The Promise You Made (Extended Version)"	6:39
16.	"Thought You Were On My Side (Extended Remix)"	5:24
17.	"When Your Heart Is Weak (Instrumental)"	4:34

All songs by Peter Kingsbery.

== Musicians ==
=== Cock Robin ===
- Peter Kingsbery – lead vocals and backing vocals, bass and synthesizers
- Anna LaCazio – lead vocals and backing vocals, synthesizers
- Clive Wright – electric guitar and synthesized guitar
- Lou Molino III – drums, drum machine and backing vocals

=== Additional musicians ===
- Paulinho da Costa – percussion
- Pat Mastelotto – percussion
- Arno Lucas – percussion
- Paul Fox – synthesizers
- Steve Hillage – rhythm guitar (tracks 14, 17) and production
- David Sanborn – alto sax solo (tracks 14, 17)
- Jimmy Maelen – percussion (tracks 14, 17)
- Roy Martin – Simmons electronic drums (tracks 14, 17)

== Miscellaneous ==
Produced by Steve Hillage

Singles:

- "When Your Heart Is Weak" – US #35, June 1985.
- "The Promise You Made" – UK #28, May 1986.
- "Thought You Were On My Side"
- "Once We Might Have Known"

== Charts ==
- #7 France
- #9 Germany
- #4 Italy
- #2 Netherlands
- #11 Switzerland
- #30 Sweden
- #61 United States

== Certifications ==
Certifications and sales for Cock Robin
Region	Certification	Certified units/sales
France (SNEP)	2× Gold	200,000^{*}
Germany (BVMI)	Gold	250,000^{^}
Netherlands (NVPI)	Gold	50,000^{^}
^{*} Sales figures based on certification alone.^{^} Shipments figures based on certification alone.
