= First Love / Last Rites =

Studio album by Cock Robin
- Released: October 30, 1989
- Recorded: 1989
- Genre: Rock
- Label: CBS 465943 2 (Europe)
- Producer: Rhett Davies

Cock Robin chronology
After Here Through Midland (1987)	First Love / Last Rites (1989)	I Don't Want to Save the World (2006)

Professional ratings
Review scores
Source	Rating
Allmusic	4/5 stars

First Love / Last Rites is the third album by Cock Robin and was released in 1989 in Europe. It was released on July 31, 1990 in the US.

== Track listing ==
1. Stumble and Fall
2. Straighter Line
3. Win or Lose
4. One Joy Bang
5. For Experience Sake
6. Hunting Down a Killer
7. Any More Than I Could Understand
8. My First Confession
9. Manzanar
10. Worlds Apart

All songs by Peter Kingsbery except "For Experience Sake" (Peter Kingsbery/Anna LaCazio)

The US version includes a cover of Conway Twitty's "It's Only Make Believe", added as track #6 (after "For Experience Sake" and before "Hunting Down a Killer").

It was the band's final album before their (temporary) split, which lasted from 1990 to 2006. It proved to be their least successful album of the first half of their career.

== Musicians ==
=== Cock Robin ===
- Peter Kingsbery: vocals, keyboards
- Anna LaCazio: vocals

=== Additional musicians ===
- Pat Mastelotto: drums
- Luis Conte: percussion
- Corky James: guitar
- John Pierce: bass
- Ramon Flores, Samuel Nolasco and Xavier Serrano: mariachi horns
- David Faragher: bass on Stumble And Fall, Any More Than I Could Understand and Manzanar
- Paul Mitchell: additional drumming on Manzanar

== Miscellaneous ==
Produced by Rhett Davies

Singles:

- Worlds Apart
- Straighter Line
- Manzanar. It's the name of a Japanese American internment camp located in California during World War II.
- It's Only Make Believe (US)

The CD sleeve features the poem It's Ours by Charles Bukowski, an excerpt from You Get So Alone at Times It Just Makes Sense (1986).

== Charts ==
- #11 France (2x Gold album)
