= Collection Gold =

1990 compilation album by Cock Robin

Collection Gold is a compilation album by Cock Robin, issued by the European branch of Sony Music in 1990. It contained 14 tracks, including several remixes and songs which were not available on Cock Robin's official studio albums. It was released on the CBS label, one of the last releases before CBS changed into Sony Music/Columbia. Its catalogue number is 467626 2.

== The album ==
Collection Gold was released by the CBS Special Marketing label, as part of a French series of midprice compilation CDs from CBS artists. The midprice CD was issued in France in 1990, but the album was also available in other countries. Although other (and more complete) compilations by Cock Robin have been released, this became a fan favourite for its inclusion of rare remixes, live tracks and b-sides, which are not available on any other album.

The album was re-issued internationally in 1998 by Sony Music, with a new cover and its slightly changed title Gold Collection.

Both versions are currently out of print, but other compilation albums by Cock Robin remain available.

== Track listing ==
1. "The Promise You Made" (1985 12" Extended Version)
2. "Thought You Were on My Side" (1985 12" Extended Version)
3. "Have You Any Sympathy?" (B-Side 'The Promise You Made')
4. "Peace on Earth" (B-Side of 'Thought You Were On My Side' and 'When Your Heart is Weak')
5. "Because It Keeps on Working"
6. "Blood of a Saint" (B-Side of 'The Biggest Fool of All')
7. "When Your Heart Is Weak" (12" Dance Mix) (According to the track listing this is a 'dance remix', but it's simply the album version)
8. "The Biggest Fool of All" (Dance Remix)
9. "El Norte" (Reinforced Dance Mix)
10. "We've Changed" (B-Side of 'Worlds Apart', 'Straighter Line', & 'Manzanar')
11. "Open Book" (Demo from 1983, also a B-Side of 'Just Around the Corner')
12. "Don't Think Twice, It's Alright" (Live)
13. "For Dear Life" (B-Side of 'El Norte')
14. "Just Around the Corner" (Single Mix)
