= I Don't Want to Save the World =

Studio album by Cock Robin
- Released: 2006
- Recorded: Revolver Studios, Thousand Oaks, California; East Iris Studios, Nashville, Tennessee; Wire, Austin, Texas; Studio Mega, Paris, France
- Genre: Pop rock
- Length: 54:01
- Label: 31 Production Edition
- Producer: Theron Carroll for Mikal Blue Productions

Cock Robin chronology
First Love / Last Rites (1989)	I Don't Want to Save the World (2006)	Songs From A Bell Tower (2010)

I Don't Want to Save the World is the fourth album by Cock Robin and was released in 2006. It sees the reformation of the band after a 16-year hiatus. It features a selection of their trademark harmonic pop. The lyrics seem to be greatly influenced by personal relations and experiences spent since the last time the duo of Kingsbery and LaCazio shared a pop group. An example of this is "Italian Soul", which may be a take upon the consequences of meeting and working together after a long time apart (Anna LaCazio is of mixed Italian-Chinese descent). Apart from a few TV appearances in 2006, mainly in France, the album was not widely promoted.

== Track listing ==
1. "Superhuman" – 4:32
2. "I Don't Want to Save the World" – 4:01
3. "Fair Enough" – 4:11
4. "Across the Freeway" – 4:28
5. "Touched" – 3:27
6. "Body Over Mind" – 3:48
7. "Bo" – 3:21
8. "Through the Years" – 4:59
9. "Italian Soul" – 4:22
10. "The Valley Below" – 4:29
11. "Dominoes" – 3:52
12. "Me and My Shaman" – 4:22
13. "Under the Star Which I Was Born" – 3:33

All songs by Peter Kingsbery except Italian Soul (LaCazio/Kingsbery/Wright), The Valley Below (Wright/Kingsbery) and Under The Star Which I Was Born (Polnareff/Kingsbery). This last song is a cover version of French singer-songwriter Michel Polnareff's song "Sous quelle étoile suis-je né ?"

== Musicians ==
=== Cock Robin ===
- Peter Kingsbery: vocals, keyboards, percussion, acoustic and electric guitar
- Anna LaCazio: vocals, keyboards
- Clive Wright: electric guitar, E-bow

=== Additional musicians ===
- Victor Indrizzio: drums
- Pat Mastelotto: drums on The Valley Below and Me And My Shaman
- John Pierce: bass
- Mikal Blue: additional electric guitar
- James McCorkel: additional electric guitar
