= After Here Through Midland =

Studio album by Cock Robin
- Released: May 25, 1987
- Recorded: 1987
- Genres: Pop rock; new wave
- Label: CBS Inc
- Producer: Don Gehman

Cock Robin chronology
Cock Robin (1985)	After Here Through Midland (1987)	First Love / Last Rites (1989)

Professional ratings
Review scores
Source	Rating
AllMusic	3.5/5 stars

After Here Through Midland is the second album by Cock Robin and was released in 1987.

Again it was a big success in continental Europe as their first eponymous album, reaching the Top 10, but was largely ignored in the United States where the album reached only #166 in the Billboard 200. The single "Just Around the Corner" proved to be the biggest hit in Europe, and it remains a staple on adult contemporary and pop music stations in France.

== Track listing ==
Side one
No.	Title	Length
1.	"Just Around the Corner"	4:16
2.	"The Biggest Fool of All"	4:24
3.	"El Norte"	4:48
4.	"I'll Send Them Your Way"	4:13
5.	"Another Story"	3:57
6.	"Coward's Courage"	4:46
7.	"Every Moment"	4:06
8.	"Precious Dreams"	4:27
9.	"After Here Through Midland"	4:05

Bonus Tracks - Non-Album B-Sides (2014 Expanded Edition)
No.	Title	Length
10.	"Open Book (B-side to "Just Around the Corner")"	3:55
11.	"Blood of a Saint (B-side to "The Biggest Fool of All")"	3:52
12.	"For Dear Life (B-side to "El Norte")"	5:03

Bonus Tracks - Remixes and Alternate Versions (2014 Expanded Edition)
No.	Title	Length
13.	"Just Around the Corner (Extended Remix)"	6:06
14.	"The Biggest Fool of All (Dance Mix)"	6:14
15.	"El Norte (Reinforced Dance Mix)"	6:12
16.	"El Norte (El Club Mix)"	5:16
17.	"El Norte (Los Bonus Beats)"	2:52

All songs by Peter Kingsbery, except "Blood of a Saint" written by Anna LaCazio and Clive Wright.

== Musicians ==
=== Cock Robin ===
- Peter Kingsbery: Lead vocals, keyboards, bass, synthesizer programming
- Anna LaCazio: lead vocals

=== Additional musicians ===
- Tod Yvega, Mark Binder: Synclavier operators
- Tod Yvega, Mark Binder, Richard Gibbs: synthesizer programmers
- Tim Pierce: guitars
- Denny Fongheiser: drums, percussion
- Dennis Herring: acoustic guitar on "The Biggest Fool Of All"
- Brian Kilgore: conga on "Precious Dreams"

== Misc ==
Produced by Don Gehman

Singles:

- Just Around the Corner
- The Biggest Fool of All
- El Norte

== Charts ==
=== Weekly charts ===
Weekly chart performance for After Here Through Midland
Chart (1987)	Peak position
Dutch Albums (Album Top 100)	6
German Albums (Offizielle Top 100)	5
Norwegian Albums (VG-lista)	8
Swedish Albums (Sverigetopplistan)	9
Swiss Albums (Schweizer Hitparade)	3
US Billboard 200	166

=== Year-end charts ===
1987 year-end chart performance for After Here Through Midland
Chart (1987)	Position
Dutch Albums (Album Top 100)	35
German Albums (Offizielle Top 100)	30
Swiss Albums (Schweizer Hitparade)	10

== Certifications ==
Certifications and sales for After Here Through Midland
Region	Certification	Certified units/sales
Switzerland (IFPI Switzerland)	Gold	25,000^{^}
^{^} Shipments figures based on certification alone.
