= When Your Heart Is Weak =

1984 single

Single by Cock Robin

from the album Cock Robin
- B-side: "Because It Keeps On Working"
- Released: 1984
- Recorded: 1984
- Genre: New wave
- Length: 4:28
- Label: Columbia Records
- Songwriter: Peter Kingsbery
- Producer: Steve Hillage

Cock Robin singles chronology
"When Your Heart Is Weak" (1984)	"Thought You Were on My Side" (1984)

"When Your Heart Is Weak" is a song by American band Cock Robin. It was released in 1984 as the first single from their self-titled album.

The song was the band's only Top 40 hit (and their only entry) on the Billboard Hot 100, peaking at No. 35. It was a Top 20 hit in several countries in Europe.

== Music video ==
The video shows the band playing in several landmarks in Joshua Tree National Park.

== Charts ==
Chart (1985)	Peak position
Belgium (Ultratop 50 Flanders)	30
Europe European Hot 100 Singles	15
France (SNEP)	9
Netherlands (Single Top 100)	19
South Africa (Springbok Radio)	26
US Billboard Hot 100	35
US Billboard Album Rock Tracks	28
West Germany (GfK)	8

== Certifications ==
Region	Certification	Certified units/sales
France (SNEP)	Silver	250,000^{*}
^{*} Sales figures based on certification alone.
