= Cock Robin (band) =

American pop rock band

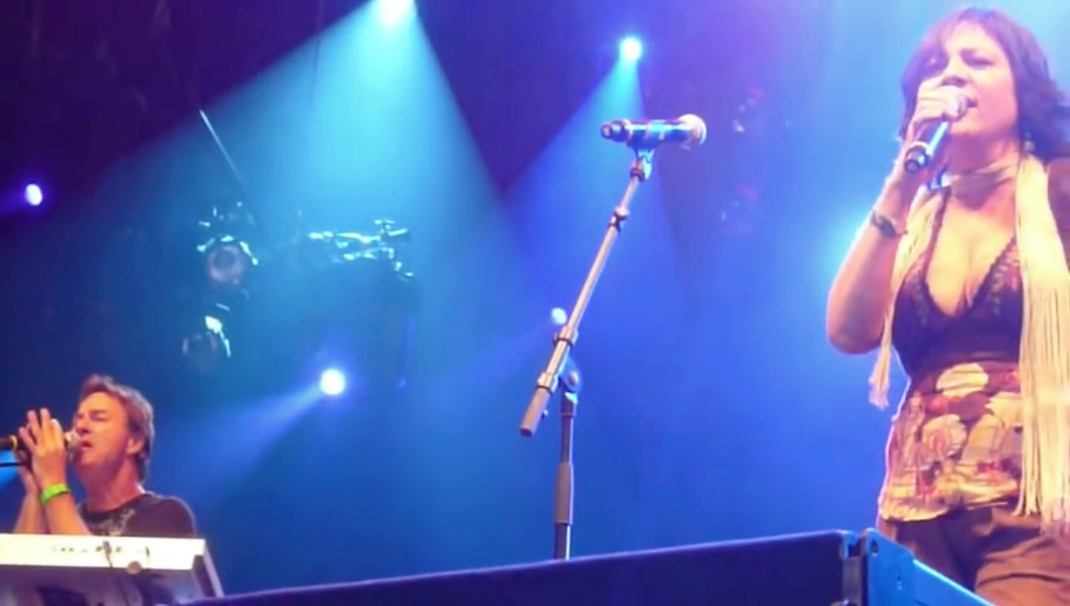
- Cock Robin live (2009)

Background information
- Origin: San Francisco, California, U.S.
- Genres: Pop rock; new wave
- Years active: 1982–1990; 2006–present
- Labels: CBS; Muzivox Production
- Members: Peter Kingsbery; Coralie Vuillemin; Didier Strub
- Past members: Anna LaCazio; Clive Wright; Lou Molino III

Cock Robin is an American pop rock band, mostly popular in the 1980s, particularly in continental Europe, where it achieved major success, notably with the single "The Promise You Made". The band was founded by singer-songwriter Peter Kingsbery in 1982, disbanded in 1990, and reformed in 2006. Their most successful singles from the period also include "When Your Heart Is Weak", "Just Around the Corner", "Thought You Were on My Side", "Every Moment" and "El Norte".

== History ==
=== 1985–1990: European success ===
Named after a 17th-century story titled "The Marriage of Cock Robin and Jenny Wren", the band formed in San Francisco, California and was signed to CBS Records.

Cock Robin's eponymous debut album was produced by Steve Hillage. Released in 1985, it had a limited impact in their native country, as with the majority of their output, but was an overnight success in Europe, especially in Belgium, France, Germany, Italy, Ireland, Portugal, Spain and the Netherlands, where the singles "When Your Heart Is Weak", "The Promise You Made" and "Thought You Were on My Side" became successful hits (with for example the latter two singles peaking at number 1 and number 4 respectively in Flanders, Belgium), and the album itself a chart-topper. "When Your Heart Is Weak" was the band's only chart single in the U.S., where it reached No. 35 in the late summer of 1985. It also became a radio favorite in South Africa in early 1986.

In mid-1987, the band, reduced from the original quartet to the duo of Peter Kingsbery and Anna LaCazio, released a second album, After Here Through Midland, produced by Don Gehman, who had previously worked with John Mellencamp, among others. As with their debut, Cock Robin's second album attracted much attention in continental Europe, where it reached the Top 5 and also scored hits with the singles "Just Around the Corner" (again a European Top 20 hit, from Scandinavia to Italy), "The Biggest Fool of All" and "El Norte".

Two years later, in 1989, the band released their third album, First Love/Last Rites, with Roxy Music veteran Rhett Davies in the role of producer. As with their previous releases, the album fared well in mainland Europe (especially in France), but failed to make an impact in the USA.

On 30 April 1990 while on tour, the band recorded their only live VHS video at the Grand Rex theatre in Paris, France, titled 'Cock Robin Live in Concert' also known as 'Live au Grand Rex'. The 14-track 66-minute video is intertwined between the tracks with a Kingsbery and LaCazio interview. Shortly after the European Tour Kingsbery and LaCazio split, with Kingsbery releasing a string of solo projects (three albums in English, one in French) in France, most notably a hit single "Only the Very Best" (English version of a Daniel Balavoine song and a Top 10 hit in France and Belgium in 1993) recorded for the Michel Berger & Luc Plamondon concept musical album Starmania, with English lyrics by Tim Rice in 1992. Anna LaCazio recorded her own solo album (Eat Life) circa 1992–93, but it was only officially released in its entirety for download in 2009.

=== Recent years ===
On 20 June 2012, Peter Kingsbery announced in his blog on the official Cock Robin website Cockrobinmusic.com that "there will be a new tour next Summer 2013 with a new album".

Another Cock Robin remix by Umpff, "Extraordinary Thing", appeared on Mixtape from Mabel the Label in October 2012.

The November 2015 issue of the French magazine Topo reported that Anna LaCazio had left Cock Robin in May 2015. Kingsbery had relocated to France and LaCazio preferred to remain in the United States and be close to her family.

Peter Kingsbery announced that Coralie Vuillemin had been chosen as the new female voice in the group. The band released their sixth studio album, Chinese Driver, on 11 March 2016.

A 5-track EP was released as download only in April 2017. The first track ("Roman Holiday [The Making Of]") is an original song, whereas the second one ("Just Before It Begins") is an original instrumental track. The last three tracks, however ("The Long Last Second", "Thought You Were on My Side" and "White Folks"), are reprises of Peter Kingsbery's solo albums or of Cock Robin songs, with new arrangements and vocals by Peter Kingsbery and Coralie Vuillemin.

With the current line-up, Cock Robin has performed in France, Portugal, Iceland, Belgium, The Netherlands, Germany, Switzerland, Italy, Luxembourg and Denmark.

On 17 September 2021 the band released a seventh studio album, Homo Alien.

In September 2022 it was announced on their Facebook account "COCK ROBIN The Band" that they had to withdraw from their planned 2023 tour but still hoped to release their new album of original material called Part of Your Tribe in conjunction with an autobiographical lyric book of the same name at some point during the year.

== Band members ==
- Peter Kingsbery — lead vocals, keyboards, bass, guitar
- Coralie Vuillemin — lead vocals, keyboards, percussion
- Didier Strub — drums, backing vocals

=== Ex-members ===
- Anna LaCazio — lead vocals, keyboards, percussion (1982–1990, 2006–2015)
- Clive Wright — guitars (1982–1988)
- Lou Molino III — drums, percussion, backing vocals (1982–1987)

=== Other members ===
- Stéphane Bonacci — guitars
- Pat Mastelotto — drums, percussion
- Tris Imboden — drums
- Hervé Koster — drums
- Corky James — guitars
- John Pierce — bass
- Lise Anderson — keyboards, backing vocals

== Discography ==
- Cock Robin (1985)
- After Here Through Midland (1987)
- First Love/Last Rites (1989)
- I Don't Want to Save the World (2006)
- Songs from a Bell Tower (2010)
- Chinese Driver (2016)
- Homo Alien (2021)
