= Éric Estève =

French author, composer and singer (born 1951)

Éric Estève (born 14 July 1951) is a French author, composer and singer.

Originally discovered by Véronique Sanson (Stephen Stills' former wife) at the age of 17, Estève recorded on Epic. Veronique offered Éric the first part of her show and used him as a background vocalist in her own show as well as on the albums Live At the Olympia 1976, Hollywood and 7e. Their mutual friend and producer Bernard Saint-Paul affectionately refers to the sound of Éric and Véronique's voices singing together as "the blend".

In 1978, Michel Berger and Luc Plamondon offered Éric the part of Ziggy in their rock opera Starmania. The original Starmania lineup included Daniel Balavoine, Claude Dubois, Diane Dufresne, France Gall, René Joly, Fabienne Thibeault, and Nanette Workman.
