= Daniel Brel =

French composer, accordionist and bandoneón player

Daniel Brel (born 1950 in Égleny) is a French composer, accordionist and bandoneón player. In 1979 at Pau, Pyrénées-Atlantiques he formed the Contratiempo quartet. He performs on the accordion in recital with singer Arnaud Marzorati.

== Recordings ==
- 1997 Bando Solo - bandonéon
- 2000 Autour du tango Quartet Contratiempo. Patrick Le Junter (piano)
- 2002 Bello Cando with François-Xavier Bigorgne (cello) live
- 2004 Daniel Brel - Quatre chemins de mélancolie Alpha (record label) (2004)
