= Just Around the Corner (song) =

Single by Cock Robin

from the album After Here Through Midland
- B-side: "Open Book"
- Released: May 11, 1987 (UK); May 14, 1987 (US)
- Length: 4:12
- Label: Columbia; CBS
- Songwriter: Peter Kingsbery
- Producer: Don Gehman

Cock Robin singles chronology
"Once We Might Have Known" (1986)	"Just Around the Corner" (1987)	"The Biggest Fool of All" (1987)

"Just Around the Corner" is a song by American rock band Cock Robin, released as the lead single off their second album After Here Through Midland (1987).

== Composition ==
Written by Peter Kingsbery and produced by Don Gehman, "Just Around the Corner" lasts four minutes and 12 seconds.

== Reception ==
Cash Box called "Just Around the Corner" "darkly ominous, brooding, yet hopeful – a brilliant cut" with a "highly original sound, with the Call and Prefab Sprout possible reference points". Jerry Smith of British magazine Music Week described the song as being a "strong, evocative material".

The song was a hit in Europe, reaching the Top 20 in several countries, but failed to chart in the band's native country of the US.

== Charts ==
=== Weekly charts ===
Weekly chart performance for "Just Around the Corner"
Chart (1987)	Peak position
Austria (Ö3 Austria Top 40)	28
Belgium (Ultratop 50 Flanders)	11
France (SNEP)	18
Italy Airplay (Music & Media)	1
Netherlands (Dutch Top 40)	19
Netherlands (Single Top 100)	14
Sweden (Sverigetopplistan)	12
Switzerland (Schweizer Hitparade)	6
West Germany (GfK)	16

=== Year-end charts ===
1987 year-end chart performance for "Just Around the Corner"
Chart (1987)	Position
Belgium (Ultratop 50 Flanders)	46
European Top 100 Singles (Music & Media)	39
