= Starmania (musical) =

Canadian–French rock opera

- Promotional poster
- Music: Michel Berger
- Lyrics: Luc Plamondon
- Book: Luc Plamondon
- Premiere: 10 April 1979; 47 years ago: Palais des Congrès, Paris, France
- Productions: 1979 Paris; 1980 Montreal; 1986 Joliette; 1988 Paris; 1991 Essen; 1993 Paris; 1996 El Paso; 2022 Paris

Starmania is a Canadian–French rock opera written in 1976 with music by Michel Berger and book and lyrics by Luc Plamondon. It debuted in 1978 with a studio recording of the songs, before premiering on stage in 1979. An English-language studio version was also produced in 1992, with lyrics by Tim Rice. Several stage revivals have been produced in France, Quebec and Germany, each with their distinctive styles.

Several of its songs have passed into mainstream Francophone pop culture, and helped original cast members Daniel Balavoine and Diane Dufresne to rise in popularity in France. It is generally considered the most famous rock opera in French history.

== Development ==
In the summer of 1974, following their initial collaboration on the single "La Déclaration d'amour", Michel Berger and France Gall travelled to Los Angeles to develop a musical, for which Berger attempted to write both the music and lyrics himself. The story of Patty Hearst – an American heiress who had been kidnapped by the Symbionese Liberation Army (SLA) earlier that year and ultimately joined her captors – served as inspiration for the project's main character, Angelina Dumas. Despite recording preliminary material at London's Morgan Studios with prominent British session musicians, including bassist Herbie Flowers, the project was eventually abandoned.

Both artists agreed that Berger's lyrics were too romanticized for the dark premise, lacking the required dramatic edge. Dissatisfied with the outcome, Berger took Gall's advice to collaborate with a lyricist who could capture the raw violence the story demanded. After Gall introduced him to the music of Canadian singer Diane Dufresne, Berger approached her songwriter, Luc Plamondon. Plamondon agreed to collaborate, and in 1977, the two secluded themselves for several months in Antibes, reshaping the themes of the Patty Hearst story into what would become Starmania.

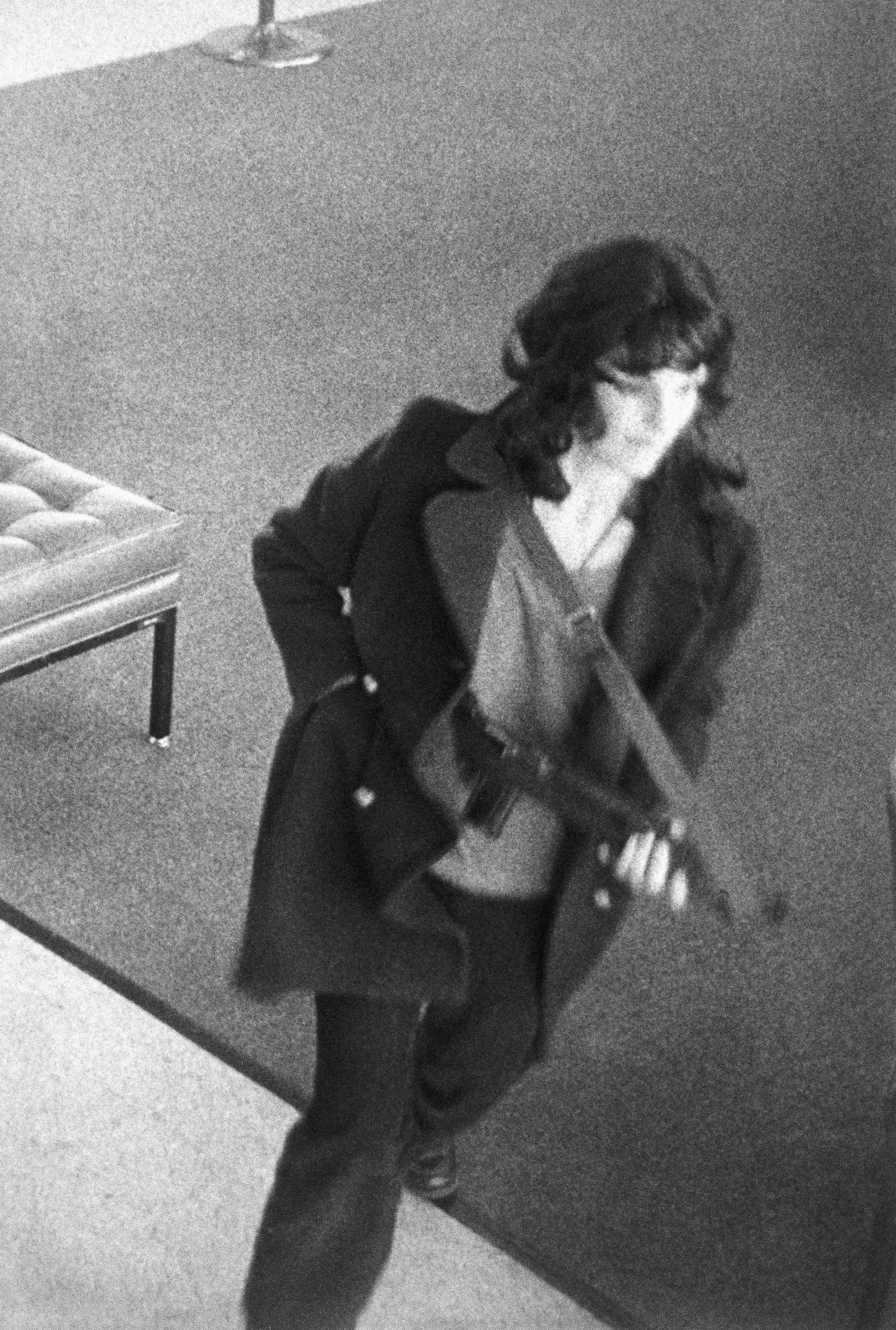
The role of Cristal is loosely based on Patty Hearst (pictured), who joined the SLA in 1974

In 1978, the project debuted as a concept album subtitled Starmania, ou la passion de Johnny Rockfort selon les évangiles télévisés (lit. 'Starmania, or the Passion of Johnny Rockfort According to the Televised Gospels'). The original recording featured Daniel Balavoine (Johnny Rockfort), France Gall (Cristal), Nanette Workman (Sadia), Claude Dubois (Zéro Janvier), Diane Dufresne (Stella Spotlight), Fabienne Thibeault (Marie-Jeanne), and Éric Estève (Ziggy). Starmania made its stage premiere in Paris the following year, with Balavoine, Gall, Workman, Dufresne, and Thibeault reprising their roles, alongside Étienne Chicot and Grégory Ken, who replaced Dubois and Estève.

== Productions ==
The 1979 Paris run was followed by Canadian productions in 1980 and 1986, and French revivals in 1988 and throughout the 1990s. A German-language adaptation of the 1988 production was played in Essen in 1991–92.

In 1992, an English version of the show was created with the release of the album Tycoon, with lyrics by Tim Rice, and starring Kim Carnes, Celine Dion, Nina Hagen, Peter Kingsbery, Cyndi Lauper, Willy Deville, Kevin Robinson and Tom Jones in the principal roles on the recording. A stage version was announced in the press on several occasions, but never materialized.

In 1993, a new French production, directed by Canadian prodigy Lewis Furey, debuted in Paris at the Mogador theatre. For a few months in 1993–94, a version of Tycoon (with re-worked and expanded lyrics) alternated with the French version, using the same actors and staging. In 2004, the 1978 recording of Starmania was honoured as a Masterwork by the Audio-Visual Preservation Trust of Canada.

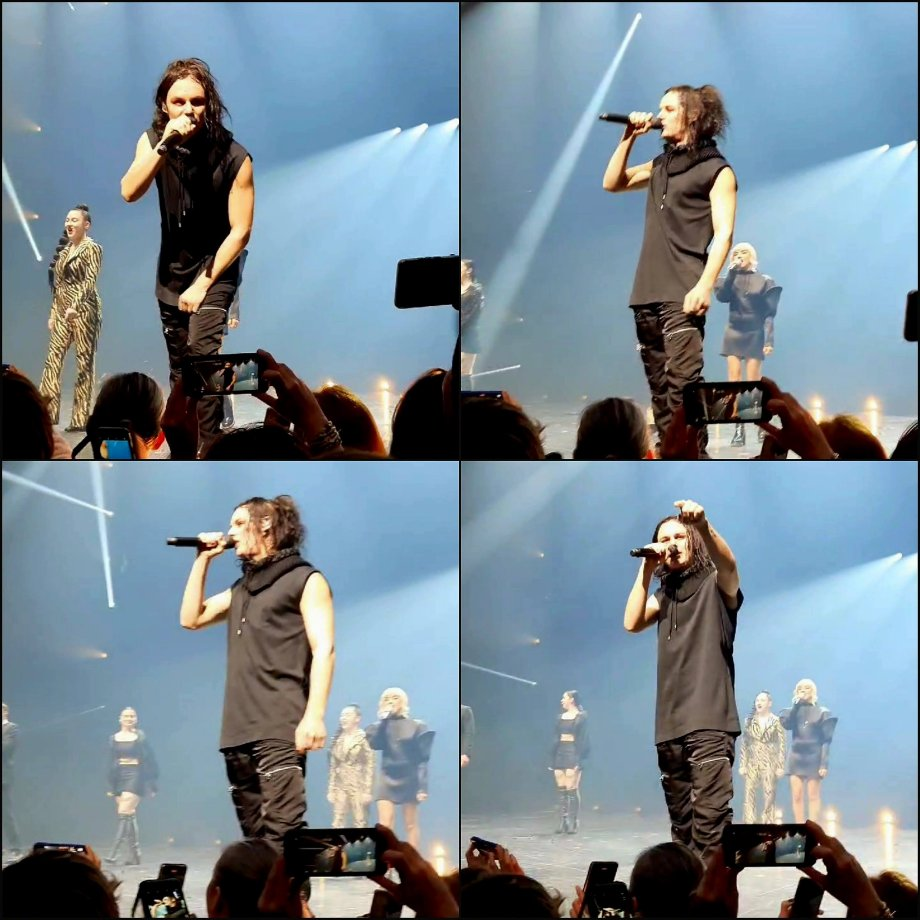
Côme performing as Johnny Rockfort in the 2022–24 production

A comeback tour, directed by Thomas Jolly, Nicolas Ghesquière and Victor Le Masne, was announced in 2020 and set to premiere in France on 11 November 2021. It was postponed to 8 November 2022, because of the COVID-19 pandemic. It played for two seasons in Paris, as well as two tours across France, Switzerland and Belgium, and a Quebec stretch in August 2024. Jolly, Le Masne, as well as Starmania scenographer Emmanuelle Le Favre and lighting designer Thomas Dechandon all went on to join the creative team which worked on the 2024 Olympics and Paralympics ceremonies.

== Plot ==
In an unspecified future, Monopolis, the new capital of the recently united Occident, is threatened by the Black Stars (Étoiles Noires), a gang led by Johnny Rockfort. Johnny is influenced by Sadia, a member of high society who secretly supports the goup and seeks political change. At night, Sadia cross-dresses to enter the criminal underworld and give instructions to the gang. Johnny and Sadia frequently meet at the Underground Café, where Marie-Jeanne works as a waitress and reflects on the monotony of her job.

Rising directly above the café is the Golden Tower (Tour Dorée), a 100-story skyscraper housing the headquarters of Zéro Janvier, a billionaire real estate tycoon running for president of the Occident. His political opponent (who does not appear in every production) is Gourou Marabout, a conspiracy theorist who advocates a return to nature and hosts drug-fueled orgies. Janvier, who campaigns on a platform of strict law and order and advocates for the creation of a "new atomic world", becomes the sworn enemy of Johnny and his gang. Under Sadia's leadership, the Black Stars vow to bring Janvier down.

Against this backdrop, three parallel love stories unfold: Marie-Jeanne's unrequited love for Ziggy, a gay record dealer aspiring to break through as a dancer; the romance between Zéro Janvier and Stella Spotlight, a famous sex symbol who has just retired from cinema; and the passionate relationship between Johnny Rockfort and television presenter Cristal, which forms the core of the narrative.

Cristal, the celebrated host of the talent show Starmania, is approached by Sadia with an offer for a clandestine interview with Johnny Rockfort, whose face remains unknown to the public. When they meet at the Underground Café, Cristal falls in love with Johnny at first sight and runs away with him (or is kidnapped by him and later joins his cause, depending on the version). Stripped of her influence over Johnny, a bitter Sadia watches as Cristal becomes the new public face of the Black Stars, using a high-tech neutron camera to hijack television airwaves and broadcast the movement's messages.

Zéro Janvier and Stella Spotlight celebrate their engagement at Naziland, a revolving nightclub atop the Golden Tower, where Ziggy now works as a disc jockey. Driven by intense jealousy, Sadia betrays the Black Stars and alerts Zéro Janvier to their plot to detonate a bomb inside the tower. Janvier's forces ambush the revolutionaries. Cristal is caught and thrown from the 100th floor or killed by another means, depending on the production. Johnny's fate also varies: he either flees the scene or is arrested and imprisoned.

As Cristal's body is carried away, Marie-Jeanne laments the state of the world. A triumphant Zéro Janvier is elected president of the Occident, but his victory is overshadowed by Johnny Rockfort's lingering threat, painting a portrait of a world torn between terrorism and totalitarianism. In the original production, Johnny attempts to avenge Cristal's death by killing Zéro Janvier, but is shot dead by Janvier's guards. His spirit then travels to another galaxy, pleading with humanity to renounce its obsession with stardom, recognize its insignificance, and strive for peace.

== Musical numbers ==
Highlights from the original 1979 production, listed in order of performance, include:

- "Quand on arrive en ville" ("When We Come to Town") – performed by Johnny Rockfort and Sadia
- "Travesti" ("Transvestite") – performed by Sadia
- "Banlieue nord" ("Northern Suburb") – performed by Johnny Rockfort
- "La Complainte de la serveuse automate" ("The Lament of the Robotic Waitress") – performed by Marie-Jeanne
- "Le Blues du businessman" ("The Businessman's Blues") – performed by Zéro Janvier
- "Un garçon pas comme les autres" ("A Boy Like No Other") – performed by Marie-Jeanne
- "La Chanson de Ziggy" ("Ziggy's Song") – performed by Ziggy
- "Au secours, j'ai besoin d'amour" ("Help, I'm in Need of Love") – performed by Cristal
- "Le rêve de Stella Spotlight" ("The Dream of Stella Spotlight") – performed by Stella Spotlight
- "Les adieux d'un sex symbol" ("The Farewells of a Sex Symbol") – performed by Stella Spotlight
- "S.O.S. d'un terrien en détresse" ("S.O.S. of an Earthling in Distress") – performed by Johnny Rockfort
- "Quand on n'a plus rien à perdre" ("When We Have Nothing Left to Lose") – performed by Johnny Rockfort and Cristal
- "Les uns contre les autres" ("Against Each Other") – performed by Marie-Jeanne
- "Ego trip" – performed by Ziggy
- "Monopolis" – performed by Cristal
- "Ce soir on danse à Naziland" ("Tonight We Dance at Naziland") – performed by Sadia
- "Le monde est stone" ("The World is Stone") – performed by Marie-Jeanne

== Characters ==
- Johnny Rockfort: leader of the Black Stars gang.
- Cristal: presenter of the television show Starmania.
- Sadia: a transvestite and the mastermind behind the Black Stars.
- Zéro Janvier: a wealthy businessman and politician.
- Stella Spotlight: a former sex symbol and Janvier's muse.
- Marie-Jeanne: the "robotic" waitress at the Underground Café.
- Ziggy: a gay record dealer who dreams of fame.
- Gourou Marabout: Janvier's political opponent.
- Roger-Roger: a news anchor.

== Notable cast ==
Character	1978	1979	1988	2022
Johnny Rockfort	Daniel Balavoine	Daniel Balavoine	Norman Groulx	Côme
Cristal	France Gall	France Gall	Martine St. Clair	Lilya Adad
Sadia	Nanette Workman	Nanette Workman	Dominique Wenta	Miriam Baghdassarian
Zéro Janvier	Claude Dubois	Étienne Chicot	Richard Groulx	David Latulippe
Stella Spotlight	Diane Dufresne	Diane Dufresne	Sabrina Lory	Maag
Marie-Jeanne	Fabienne Thibeault	Fabienne Thibeault	Maurane	Alex Montembault
Ziggy	Éric Estève	Grégory Ken	Renaud Hantson	Adrien Fruit
Gourou Marabout	Michel Berger	Roddy Julienne	—	Simon Geoffroy / Malaika Lacy
Roger-Roger	René Joly	René Joly	Luc Lafitte	Thomas Jolly (voice)

== Recordings ==
=== Original cast recordings ===
- 1978: Starmania, original studio version (double LP or 1 CD, 80:35)
- 1979: Starmania – The Show, complete live version (4 LP-box or double CD, 125:37)
- 1980: Starmania Made in Quebec, studio version (Beau-Bec, double LP, unknown duration, never reissued on CD)
- 1986: L'opéra rock Starmania, live Quebec version (Audiogram, LP, 47:05, never reissued on CD)
- 1988: Starmania 88, live version (double CD, 72:02)
- 1989: Starmania – Remixed, complete live version (double CD, 110:38)
- 1992: Tycoon, studio version in English (CD, 59:44)
- 1994: Starmania – Mogador 94, live version (CD, 77:20)
- 1998: Starmania – 20th Anniversary, complete live version (double CD, 125:19)

=== Other releases ===
- Celine Dion recorded several songs from the musical on her 1991 album Dion chante Plamondon.
