= Peter Kingsbery =

American singer-songwriter (born 1952)

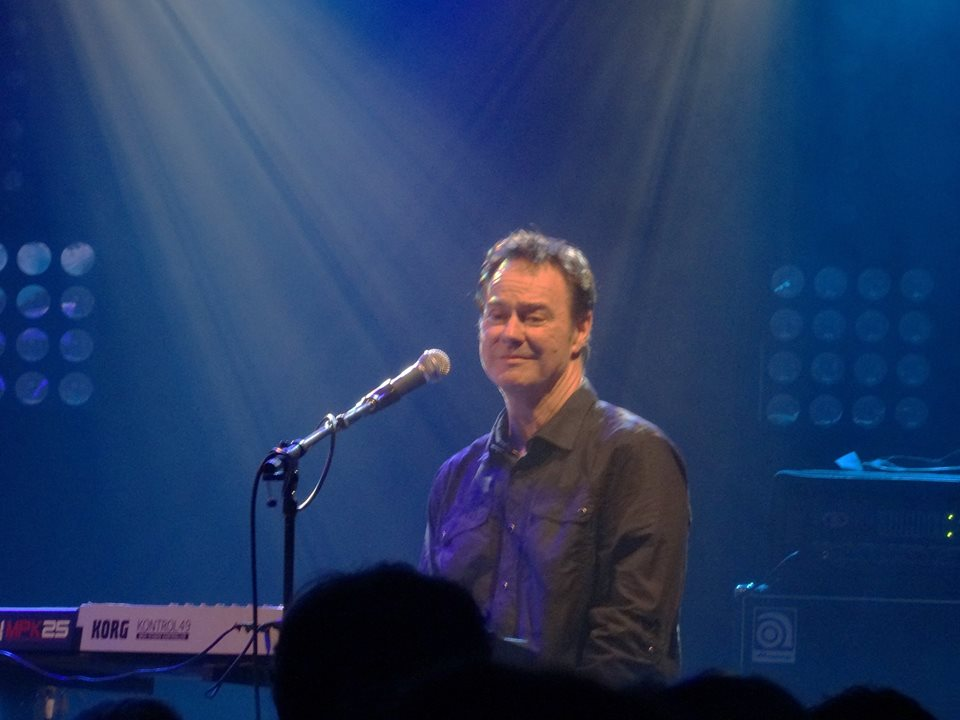
- Kingsbery performing in 2015

Background information
- Born: December 2, 1952 (age 73); Phoenix, Arizona, U.S.

Peter Kingsbery (born December 2, 1952) is an American singer-songwriter who co-founded the band Cock Robin in the 1980s. He grew up in Austin (Texas) where he studied classical music. He moved to Nashville (Tennessee) where he began his career as a musician (he accompanied Brenda Lee on piano on a few tours) and then to Los Angeles at the end of the 1970s where he began a career as a singer-songwriter. He composed a few songs for Smokey Robinson, and one of his compositions, Pilot Error, sung by Stephanie Mills, had some success in the dance charts in 1983.

At the beginning of the 1980s, Kingsbery founded the group Cock Robin with Anna LaCazio, Clive Wright and Lou Molino III which enjoyed commercial success in Western Europe mainly. Failing to break their native country with a first self-titled album in 1985, the quartet became a duo of Kingsbery and LaCazio when they released their second album in 1987. After the band split up in the early 1990s following their third album, Kingsbery released four albums over a decade, and achieved a major hit in France with the song "Only the Very Best." With his fourth album he sang in French.

He has since reformed Cock Robin with Anna LaCazio and on/off former member Clive Wright in 2006 and has released one studio album I Don't Want to Save the World the same year and a Live album in 2009. A new studio album Songs From A Bell Tower was released in October 2010.

== Solo career ==
After the band split in 1990, Peter Kingsbery pursued a solo career in France, where he settled. Kingsbery speaks fluent French and is more famous in France than he is in his native US.

After signing with a new label (Barclay), he recorded his first solo album A Different Man in 1991 in California that he co-produced with his friend, drummer Pat Mastelotto. Kingsbery broadened his skills by not only playing the piano or organ but also the accordion. Breaking with the style of Cock Robin, he introduced more classical instruments such as wind instruments (saxophone, flute, trombone and euphonium) or traditional as the oud (or lute, giving Slavic accents to the song Hélène). Kingsbery recorded a cover version of How Can I Be Sure, a hit by the band The Rascals dating from 1968. The album which originally included 10 songs, was re-released with 2 extra tracks "Love In Motion" and "The Sublime" for the international market. It was followed by a tour in France, where he only played the piano in small clubs across the country and Paris (in 1992, he played to a packed Théâtre Grévin).

Shortly after, Kingsbery participated in the concept album musical Tycoon, the English version of the French cult musical Starmania by Michel Berger & Luc Plamondon, with English lyrics by Tim Rice. He sang Only The Very Best, which became a major hit in France in 1992, and also the song Ego Trip on the album.

A few years later, in 1995, he released his second solo album Once in a Million. Recorded in various studios (in Los Angeles, London, Paris, Toulouse, Biarritz and Brussels), he continued to use classical instruments (strings, trumpet and harmonica). Besides his usual contributing musicians like Clive Wright and Pat Mastelotto, he enrolled some French players with the likes of drummer Hervé Coster or jazz musician Stéphane Belmondo. This album was also followed by a tour in small venues in France.

Released in 1997, Pretty Ballerina, the third solo studio album stands out from the others for several reasons. It was entirely recorded in France with the participation of French front musicians such as Mathieu Chedid. Also, uniquely in the discography of this singer-songwriter, the album title is not taken from one of his original songs but from the American band The Left Banke's song dating from 1966 to 1967. The album also includes a few reprises, notably Brand New Year in a new version from Kingsbery's own previous album.

In 2006, Kingsbery found himself again at the front of the stage with the return of Cock Robin.

== Discography ==
- 1991: A Different Man
- 1995: Once in a Million
- 1997: Pretty Ballerina
- 2002: Mon Inconnue
- 2014: Much Taller Than on the Internet (Mini-album and film in collaboration with Umpff).

See also the Cock Robin discography.
