= Nanette Workman =

Canadian-American singer-songwriter and actress (born 1945)

- Born: Nanette Joan Workman; 20 November 1945 (age 80); Brooklyn, New York, U.S.
- Origin: Jackson, Mississippi, United States and Ormstown, Quebec, Canada
- Genres: Vocal, rock
- Occupations: Singer-songwriter, actress, author
- Instrument: Vocals
- Years active: c. 1956--2025
- Website: Official website

Nanette Joan Workman (born 20 November 1945) is an American-Canadian singer-songwriter, actress and author, who has been based in Ormstown, Quebec, Canada, for much of her career. She holds dual citizenship in both the United States and Canada. She was raised by musician parents in Jackson, Mississippi, where she began her first performances. Although raised as an English speaker, she mainly performs in French. She has recorded with well-known musicians in the U.S., Canada, UK and France and has been recognized in Mississippi by being elected to that state's Musicians Hall of Fame and having a Francophone house named after her at the state university.

== Biography ==
=== Childhood ===
Workman was born in Brooklyn, New York, on 20 November 1945, to musician parents. Her mother, Beatryce Kreisman, was in the chorus of Naughty Marietta with the New York City Opera Company, and her father, Ernest Workman, played trumpet in Tommy Dorsey's orchestra. She grew up in Jackson, Mississippi. As a child she studied piano and began her career at 11, appearing in the local WLBT television series Mr. Magic (later Junior Time) until she was given her own weekly show, Teen Tempos.

She graduated from Provine High School and attended the University of Southern Mississippi in Hattiesburg, leaving college at 18 for Broadway.

=== Career ===
After understudying the lead of How to Succeed in Business Without Really Trying, she played the role of Rosemary in 1964 and later played the lead in summer stock. In 1966, Workman met Tony Roman and recorded her first French single, "Et Maintenant", for him in Canada, where the song remained on the charts for fifteen weeks after becoming number one. Over the next two years she became a Canadian recording and TV star, finally hosting Fleurs d'amour, fleurs d'amitié. In 1969, Workman moved to England where she appeared weekly on Peter Cook and Dudley Moore's comedy series Not Only... But Also. Mistakenly credited as Nanette Newman, Workman sang backing vocals on "You Can't Always Get What You Want" and "Country Honk" (the acoustic precursor to "Honky Tonk Women"), tracks from The Rolling Stones' 1969 album Let It Bleed (she's credited as Nanette Newman, and some have confused her with the British actress married to director Bryan Forbes). She also worked with John Lennon and Elton John. In addition, she appeared in one of the black-and-white episodes of The Benny Hill Show (appearing as Nanette), performing "Everybody's Singing Like Now" on the 24 February 1971 edition.

Workman toured France in 1973 as an opening act for Johnny Hallyday. She made three albums with Yves Martin touring Africa, Polynesia and Europe before returning to Quebec in 1974 where she recorded several more French albums. Lady Marmalade, Danser Danser, Donne Donne and especially Call Girl (by Luc Plamondon) placed first on the hit parades. Returning to France in 1978, she starred in the Rock Opera Starmania as Sadia. In 1979, she sang backing vocals in the Mahogany Rush song "Sister Change" (Tales of an Unexpected album). In 1980, she made an album Chaude in collaboration with her brother Billy Workman and Luc Plamondon and toured Quebec with the show Du gramophone au laser which recounted the history of the Québécois chanson. In 1990, she returned to Paris to become La Diva in Plamondon-Berger's second rock opera, La Légende de Jimmy, based on the life of James Dean.

In April 2000, Workman was inducted into the Mississippi Musicians Hall of Fame. Roots N Blues, another album in English, was released in May 2001. In 2001, she also appeared in a Radio-Canada television series, Rivière-des-Jérémie, and was the hostess for thirteen episodes of Generation 70.

In 2007, she was recognized by the State of Mississippi when Governor Haley Barbour honored her at the opening of The Nanette Workman French (Francophone) House on the Mississippi State University campus. The house accommodates American and French-speaking students from around the world as an upper-classman residence.

=== Personal life ===
She has one son, Jesse (born c. 1987).

== Awards and recognition ==
- 2000: Mississippi Musicians Hall of Fame

== Entertainment industry works ==
The following is a list of her major entertainment industry works:

=== Discography ===
- 1967 Nanette
- 1967 Je me rétracte
- 1967 Fleurs d'amour, fleurs d'amitié (with Tony Roman)
- 1968 Nanette (compilation)
- 1970 Nanette (first solo English-language album)
- 1976 Lady Marmalade
- 1976 Nanette Workman (French album)
- 1976 Nanette Workman (LP with English versions of earlier songs)
- 1977 Grits and Cornbread
- 1977 Nanette Workman (French album)
- 1978 Starmania (with other artists, soundtrack to musical)
- 1979 Disque d'or
- 1979 Les Titres d'or de Nanette Workman
- 1980 Chaude (concept album made with Luc Plamondon)
- 1983 Nanette Workman
- 1989 Changement d'adresse
- 1991: Collection souvenir (CD)
- 1992 La légende de Jimmy (with other artists: musical soundtrack)
- 1993 Les Plus Belles Chansons De Starmania (1978 concept cast highlights)
- 1994 Rock & Romance 1994 (new versions of her hits from the 1970s and 1980s)
- 1996 Une à une
- 1998 Best of Nanette Workman
- 1998 Québec
- 1999 Love Taker with Peter Frampton
- 2001 Roots 'n' Blues
- 2003 Vanilla Blues Cafe
- 2003 Honky Tonk Woman (compilation)
- 2005 Mississippi Rolling Stone
- 2007 Danser Danser (compilation)
- 2012 Just Gettin' Started No. 42 CAN

=== Soundtrack appearances ===
- 1984 American Dreamer (performer: "Dreamer")
- 2004 The Five of Us (Elles étaient cinq) ("Lady Marmalade")

=== Film ===
- 1975 Mustang as Barbara
- 1982 Scandale as Nanette Workman
- 1984 Evil Judgement as April
- 1985 Night Magic as Pinky (voice)
- 1997 J'en suis! as Sandy Klein
- 1999 Ladies Room as Ricki
- 2006 Bon Cop, Bad Cop as a Ballet Teacher
- 2009 Suzie as Dealer
- 2011 La Run

=== Television series ===
- 1968 Fleurs d'amour, fleurs d'amitié, as Host
- 1970 Not Only... But Also as herself
- 1979 Collaroshow (TV) episode dated 6 October 1979 as herself
- 2001 Rivière-des-Jérémie as Sarah Blacksmith
- 2003 L'auberge du chien noir (TV) one TV episode "Qui perd gagne", as herself

=== Television films ===
- 1969 Je T'aimerai Toujours
- 1986 C.A.T. Squad aka Stalking Danger
- 1997 Platinum as herself At The Cocktail
- 2003 Nightwaves as Sally Winters

== Writings ==
- 1999 Workman, Nanette: Nanette. Montreal (biographical with photographs)
