= Nicole Martin (singer) =

Canadian singer (1949–2019)

- Born: September 29, 1949; Donnacona, Quebec, Canada
- Died: February 19, 2019 (aged 69); Quebec, Canada
- Occupations: Singer-songwriter, host, Director, Producer
- Awards: Festival de la rose d'or
- Website: www.nicolemartin.ca

Nicole Martin (29 September 1949 – 19 February 2019) was a Québécois singer-songwriter, host, director and producer.

== Biography ==
Nicole Martin was born on 29 September 1949 in Donnacona, Quebec, Canada to Joseph Martin and Simone Brousseau. She grew up in Quebec City.

Martin started playing piano when she was five years old. She started her career by singing and hosting in Quebec City's clubs and cabarets, when she was fourteen. Starting in 1965, she performed for five years in Quebec cabarets with a vibraphonist named Frédéric. In 1970, on Tony Roman's initiative, she took on the character of Zerra. It would only last a few rock concerts.

She signed a contract with Yves Martin in 1971. She published her first publicly acclaimed songs: "La première nuit d'amour", "Oui, paraît-il", "On est fait pour vivre ensemble" and "Les coeurs n'ont pas de fenêtres". The latter two songs were sung in duo with Jimmy Bond between 1973 and 1975. In 1974, she won an interpretation prize at the Festival de la rose d'or in France for "Ce serait dommage". She sung love songs to great success from 1975 onward.

Martin sung "Bonsoir tristesse" at the 1977 Yamaha World Popular Song Festival in Tokyo and won the Festival's first prize. The song was composed by Francis Lai, with whom she collaborated starting in 1976. She toured Japan, and then gave recitals at the Grand Théâtre de Québec and at the Place des Arts in 1978, 1979 and 1981. She also was the subject of multiple television specials. In 1981, she participated at the Jean Lapointe tribute show.

She withdrew from performance in the mid-1990s, but returned in 2010. She focused on publishing discs between 1988 and 1991, producing for Fernand Gignac, Michel Louvain and Michèle Richard under her label Diva.

Nicole Martin died on 19 February 2019. She posthumously received a Medal of the National Assembly on 1 October 2019.

== Discography ==
Singles
Year	Title
1967	Heureux tous les deux/Je t’aime une fois, deux fois
1967	Quand on est amoureux/Écoutez bien
1968	Playboy/Karcasson
1969	Premier amour/Dans l’année 2525
1970	Si j’avais ton amour/Je vais me marier
1972	Tout tourne et tout bouge/Une photo de toi
1972	Toi mon ami, mon amour/Je revis, Dieu merci
1973	La première nuit d’amour/Je n’partirai plus
1973	Nous sommes comme le rock & roll/Je veux t’aimer, toi
1973	Je t’oublierai/Si c’est toi
1973	Tes yeux/Jimmy, Jimmy
1974	Oui, paraît-il/Le monde est beau
1974	On est fait pour vivre ensemble/On s’aimera
1974	Ce serait dommage/Jean-François
1974	Les coeurs n’ont pas de fenêtres/Comme il fait beau aujourd’hui
1974	Tant pis/Mon amour pour toi
1974	On est fait pour vivre ensemble/Flip, flop & fly/Agadou dou dou/Notre amour n’est plus qu’une habitude
1974	Les coeurs n’ont pas de fenêtres/Lâche pas la patate/Loin de vous/Les aventures d’une jeune veuve
1975	La chanson de notre amour/Qu’est-ce qu’on peut y faire
1975	Quand on est deux/Laissez-nous notre rock & roll
1975	Dites-moi, dites-moi/Les femmes chantent
1976	Il suffit/Hymne à l’amour
1976	Tu n’peux pas t’figurer/Les aboiteaux
1976	Je lui dirai/Tous les enfants
1977	Bravo/Rien n’est impossible
1977	Cet enfant de toi/Maintenant ou jamais
1977	Bonsoir tristesse/J’ai peur
1978	Une photo de toi/Oui paraît-il
1978	Je t’oublierai/La première nuit d’amour
1978	Tes yeux/Jimmy, Jimmy
1978	On est fait pour vivre ensemble/Les coeurs n’ont pas de fenêtre
1978	Ne t’en vas pas/Quelques pas dans la Ronde
1978	Vivre libre/De l’autre côté du mur
1979	Laisse-moi partir/Quand on a que l’amour
1979	Tout seul au monde/Instrumental
1980	Illusion de la nuit/L’amour au singulier
1981	Il était une fois des gens heureux/Instrumental
1982	La fille en amour/Pour une fois
1982	Pense à moi/Sans toi
1983	Les femmes changent/Instrumental
1983	L’amour avec toi/Je suis femme et musique
1984	Une fille rétro/Oublie-moi
1984	Le rock du samedi soir/Pense un peu à moi
1985	Je l’aime/Je vis pour la vie
1985	Il est en nous l’amour/Instrumental
1986	Je t’aime autant qu’avant/Instrumental
1987	Pars/Instrumental
1987	Amoureuse/Instrumental
1987	Plus envie de vivre/Instrumental
1988	Souffrir et sourire/Instrumental
1989	C’est l’amour/Instrumental
1992	Aimons-nous

Albums
Year	Title
1968	Nicole et Frédéric en spectacle
1973	La première nuit d’amour
1974	Les coeurs n’ont pas de fenêtres
1975	Nicole Martin/Jimmy Bond
1975?	Le disque d’or
1976	L'hymne à l’amour
1977	Nicole Martin
1978	Nicole Martin
1978	10 ans de ma vie
1979	Laisse-moi partir
1979	Collection d’or
1979	Radio Star
1979	Nicole Noël Martin
1980	Laissez-moi chanter
1981	Les Plouffe
1982	Une affaire de coeur
1983	Nostalgie de Noël
1984	L’amour avec toi
1985	Il est en nous l'amour
1987	Histoires de femmes
1992	Le goût d’aimer
1992	20 ans d’amour
