= Claude Dubois =

Canadian musical artist

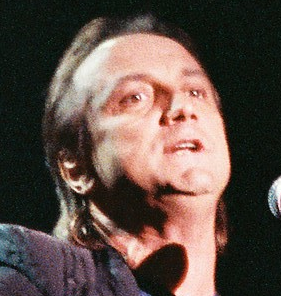

Background information
- Born: Claude André Dubois; 24 April 1947 (age 79); Montreal, Quebec, Canada
- Genres: Folk, rock, pop rock
- Occupation: Singer-songwriter
- Instruments: Vocals, guitar, piano, banjo
- Years active: 1964–present
- Website: www.claudedubois.ca

Claude André Dubois (born 24 April 1947) is a Canadian singer-songwriter.

== Career ==
Dubois was an early star of the Francophone musical Starmania. He was a vocalist in the Canadian famine relief song "Tears Are Not Enough" and was nominated Most Promising Male Vocalist at the Juno Awards of 1985.

In 2001, Dubois was the recipient of the National Achievement Award at the annual Francophone SOCAN Awards held in Montreal.

More recently, Dubois accused the Canadian Broadcasting Corporation of "racism" and "insulting Quebecers" after cutting all Quebec artists from the televised version of the 2008 Canadian Songwriters Hall of Fame gala in Toronto.
