= Anna LaCazio =

American vocalist (born 1962)

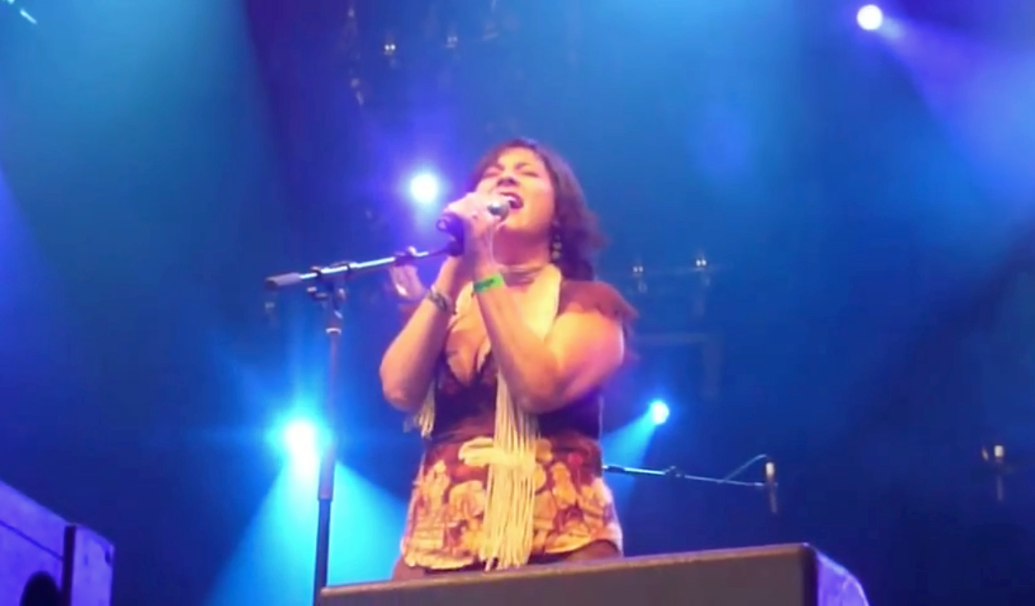
LaCazio singing "For Experience Sake" (from First Love/Last Rites)

Anna LaCazio (born January 26, 1962) is an American vocalist, best known as a member of the American pop rock band Cock Robin. Her father was Italian and her mother Chinese.

== Biography ==
=== With Cock Robin ===
She co-founded the band with Peter Kingsbery in the early '80s in Los Angeles, and remained with the group through three albums and tours with, among others, Bryan Adams, the Bangles and James Taylor. Although they experienced only limited success in the U.S., Cock Robin gained substantial acclaim in Europe. However, failing to sustain momentum, the group dissolved in 1990. In 2006 she took part in the reforming of Cock Robin and sang on their fourth studio album, followed by a live album and a new tour in 2009.

The November 2015 issue of the French magazine Topo reported that Anna LaCazio had left Cock Robin in May 2015. Kingsbery had relocated to France and LaCazio preferred to remain in the United States and be close to her family.

=== Solo career ===
During the 90s, LaCazio sang occasional backup for artists from Corey Hart to Purple Mountain Matinee. In 1992 she recorded a solo album, Eat Life, that was not released before 2009. She also appeared on Kingsbery's 1997 release Pretty Ballerina, with a re-recording of the Cock Robin track "More Than Willing". She moved from Los Angeles to the California desert, where she also has been performing as part of Ra Sol. In 2008, she contributed a reading of her poem "A Song for Lost Blossoms" to the album of the same name by Harold Budd and former Cock Robin member Clive Wright.

In 2013, she recorded a duet with French vocalist Tristan Décamps on his album Le Bruit des Humains.
