= Luc Plamondon =

Canadian lyricist (born 1942)

Luc Plamondon OC CQ
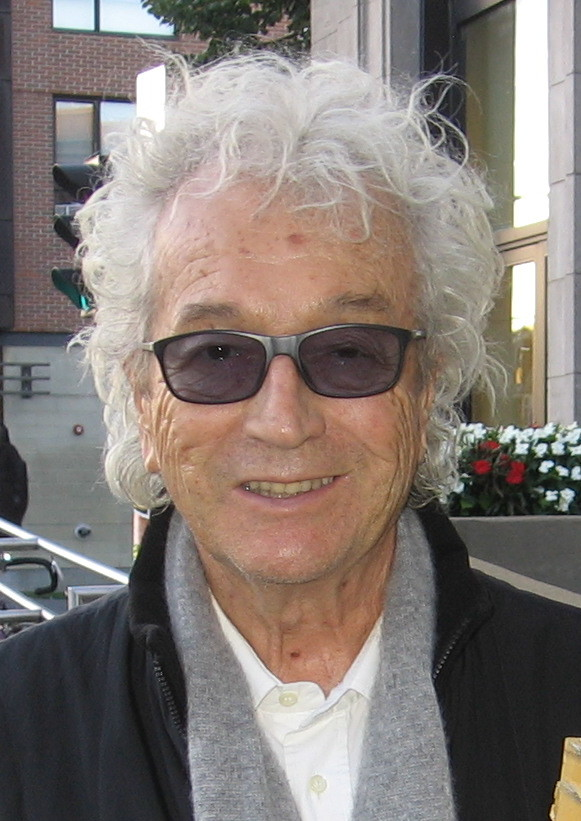
- Plamondon in 2015

Background information
- Born: March 2, 1942 (age 84); Saint-Raymond, Quebec, Canada
- Occupations: Lyricist; music executive

Luc Plamondon OC, CQ (born March 2, 1942) is a French-Canadian lyricist and music executive. His work includes the musicals Starmania and Notre-Dame de Paris.

He is the brother of Louis Plamondon, a long-serving member of the House of Commons of Canada.

Plamondon has accepted honours from Canadian institutions and is a francophone nationalist and Quebec sovereigntist.

He was born in Saint-Raymond. His father was a horse dealer. He learned the piano and undertook classical studies at the Petit Séminaire de Québec. He says that he entered the seminary to be a priest and that he came out a poet.

However, when his interview was published, the word "poet" became "painter", hence the misunderstanding that he was an expert in painting. On the other hand, although he has never painted, he is a fan of modern painting.

== Activities ==
From 1972, in addition to his collaborations with Emmanuelle, Monique Leyrac, Renée Claude and Diane Dufresne, he also wrote songs for many Quebec and European artists, such as Céline Dion, Julien Clerc, Nicole Croisille, Françoise Hardy, Johnny Hallyday, Richard Cocciante, Claude Dubois, Nicole Martin, Robert Charlebois, Pierre Bertrand, Fabienne Thibeault, Nanette Workman, Martine St-Clair, Diane Tell, Éric Lapointe, Ginette Reno, Julie Arel, Donald Lautrec, Petula Clark, Murray Head, Catherine Lara, Garou, Julie Zenatti, Daniel Balavoine, Barbara, France Castel, Bruno Pelletier and Marie Denise Pelletier.

From 1976, he wrote, in collaboration with the composer Michel Berger, the rock opera Starmania, including SOS of an earthling in distress and A boy not like the others (Ziggy). Michel Berger chose him as lyricist precisely because he makes French sound in a particular way. The ambitious musical project, presented as the first French-speaking rock opera, was released on disc in the fall of 1978 with the help of French artists (France Gall, Daniel Balavoine), and Quebecois (Diane Dufresne, Fabienne Thibeault, Claude Dubois).

== See also ==
- Culture of Quebec
- Music of Quebec
