= Fabienne Thibeault =

French Canadian singer (born 1952)

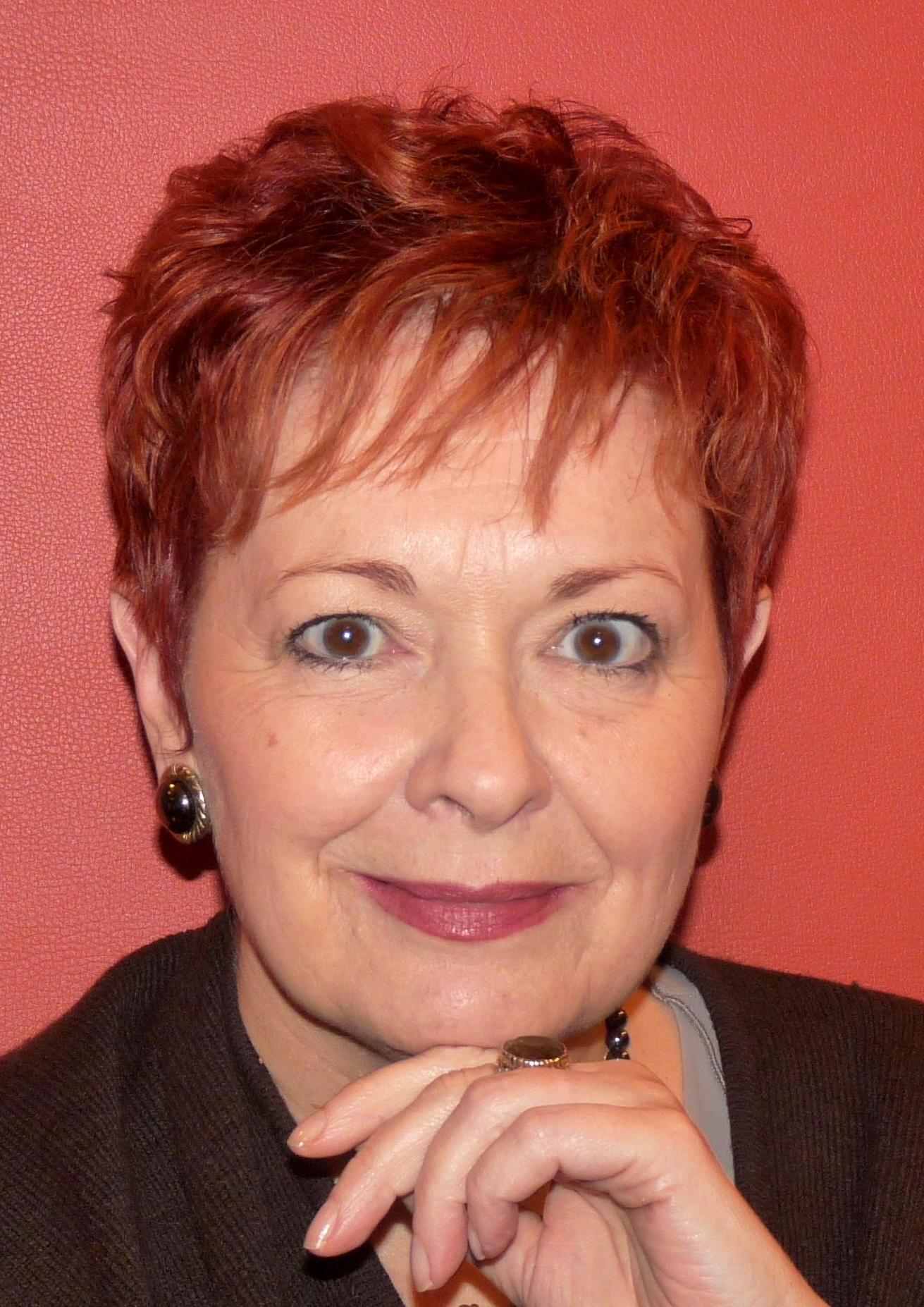

Background information
- Born: 16 June 1952 (age 73); Montreal, Quebec, Canada
- Years active: 1972–present
- Website: fabiennethibeault.com

Fabienne Thibeault (born 16 June 1952 in Montreal, Quebec) is a French Canadian singer. She is particularly known for her role in Starmania. Thibeault has released numerous albums over her career. She has been the recipient of two Félix Awards.

== History ==
She began her singing career at 21, placing third at the Festival international de la chanson de Granby in 1972. In 1973 she won the same competition. She then went on to touring and singing with other better known Quebec artists, including Plume Latraverse and Sylvain Lelièvre. She released her first album De laine et de bois (Of Wool and Wood) in 1976.

By 1972, she had caught the attention of producer Luc Plamondon. He asked Thibeault to join the cast of Starmania, which he had written with Michel Berger, in the role of Marie-Jeanne. Thibeault toured with the show in Quebec and Europe, then on her own.

Thibeault has been recognised with two Félix Awards. The first in 1979 as Female Performer of the Year, and the second in 1981 for pop LP of the year.

Success in Europe, along with marriage to French saxophone player Jean-Pierre Debarbat, led her to spend increasing amounts of time in France, where she now lives. In July 2001, Thibeault and her husband announced they were getting divorced. They promised, however, to continue their work together promoting rural life in the diverse regions of France where they live, and the preservation of agricultural traditions, through the various associations they have created.

== Albums ==
- 1976: De laine et de bois (Kébec-Disc)
- 1977: La vie d'astheure (Kébec-Disc)
- 1977: Au doux milieu de nous – Fabienne Thibeault chante Gilles Vigneault (Kébec-Disc)
- 1978: Starmania (Kébec Frog)
- 1980: Profil Vol. 1 (Kébec-Disc)
- 1980: Conversation (Kébec-Disc)
- 1981: Fabienne Thibeault – Je suis née ce matin (Kébec-Disc)
- 1981: Les plus belles chansons de Fabienne Thibeault (Warner Brothers)
- 1982: Le blues à Fabienne (Kébec-Disc)
- 1982: Les chants aimés Vol. 1 (Kébec-Disc)
- 1983: Cœur voyageur (Les Disques Béluga)
- 1984: Les chants aimés Vol. 2 (Les Disques Béluga)
- 1985: Profil Vol. 2 (Kébec-Disc)
- 1987: Chaleur humaine (WEA - Warner)
- 1992: Les plus belles chansons – Double best-of album (Les Disques Béluga)
- 1992: Sur ma voie (duo with Jean-Pierre Debarbat) (PRO-Music)
- 1996: Martin de Touraine (duo with Jean-Pierre Debarbat) (Disques Vinci)
- 1998: Québécoise (Guy Cloutier Communications)
- 2000: Partage (Musisoft)
- 2002: Sélection "talents" (Warner Music France)
- 2004: Made in Québec (Sony Musique)
- 2006: Notre Terre (duo with Jean-Pierre Debarbat), an 8 CD "rural opera"

== Contributions ==
- 1974: Plume Latraverse – Plume pou digne (Deram) – "Le gros flash mauve"
- 1975: Sylvain Lelièvre – Petit matin (Disques Le Nordet) – "Old Orchard"
- 1976: Sylvain Lelièvre – Programme doubl (Disques Presqu'île) – "Programme double", and "Chanson de Pierrot"
- 1976: Clan Murphy – Le cœur et la raison (Polydor) – "La moisson"
- 1979: Francis Lai – Movie soundtrack: À nous deux (Deram) – "À nous deux"
- 1980: Je vous entends chanter – Tribute album to Gilles Vigneault (Kébec-Disc)
- 1983: Abba Cada Bra – Musical tale by Swedish group ABBA (WEA – Warner) – "Délivrés", and "Imagine-toi"
- 1983: Yves Duteil – En concert à l'Olympia (Kébec-Disc) – "Je voudrais faire cette chanson"
- 1984: Ma première chanson – musical tale (Disques Girafe) – "La larme"
- 1985: Chanteurs sans frontières – Ethiopian relief benefit single(Pathé Marconi)
- 1985: Henri Salvador – Henri (EMI - Pathé Marconi) - "Moi j'prends mon temps"
- 1986: Richard Cocciante – L'homme qui vole (Virgin) – "Question de feeling"
- 1986: Bach et Bottine – Movie soundtrack (Disques Audiogram) – "Fais-moi voir", duo with Michel Rivard, and "Pourquoi ne pas parler d'amour?"
- 1986: La fugue du petit poucet – children's musical tale (Éditions du Petit Matin) – "D'accord, d'accord"
- 1995: Luc Plamondon Les grandes chansons – Tribute album to Luc Plamondon (Productions Guy Cloutier) – "Ma mère chantait", and "Question de feeling", duo with Richard Cocciante
- 1996: Collection Atlas - Collection of French-language songs (Éditions Atlas Paris)
- 2003: Ils chantent Michel Berger – Tribute album to Michel Berger (Warner Music France) – "Le monde est stone"

== See also ==
- List of Quebec musicians
- Music of Quebec
- Culture of Quebec
