= Kate Ryan discography =

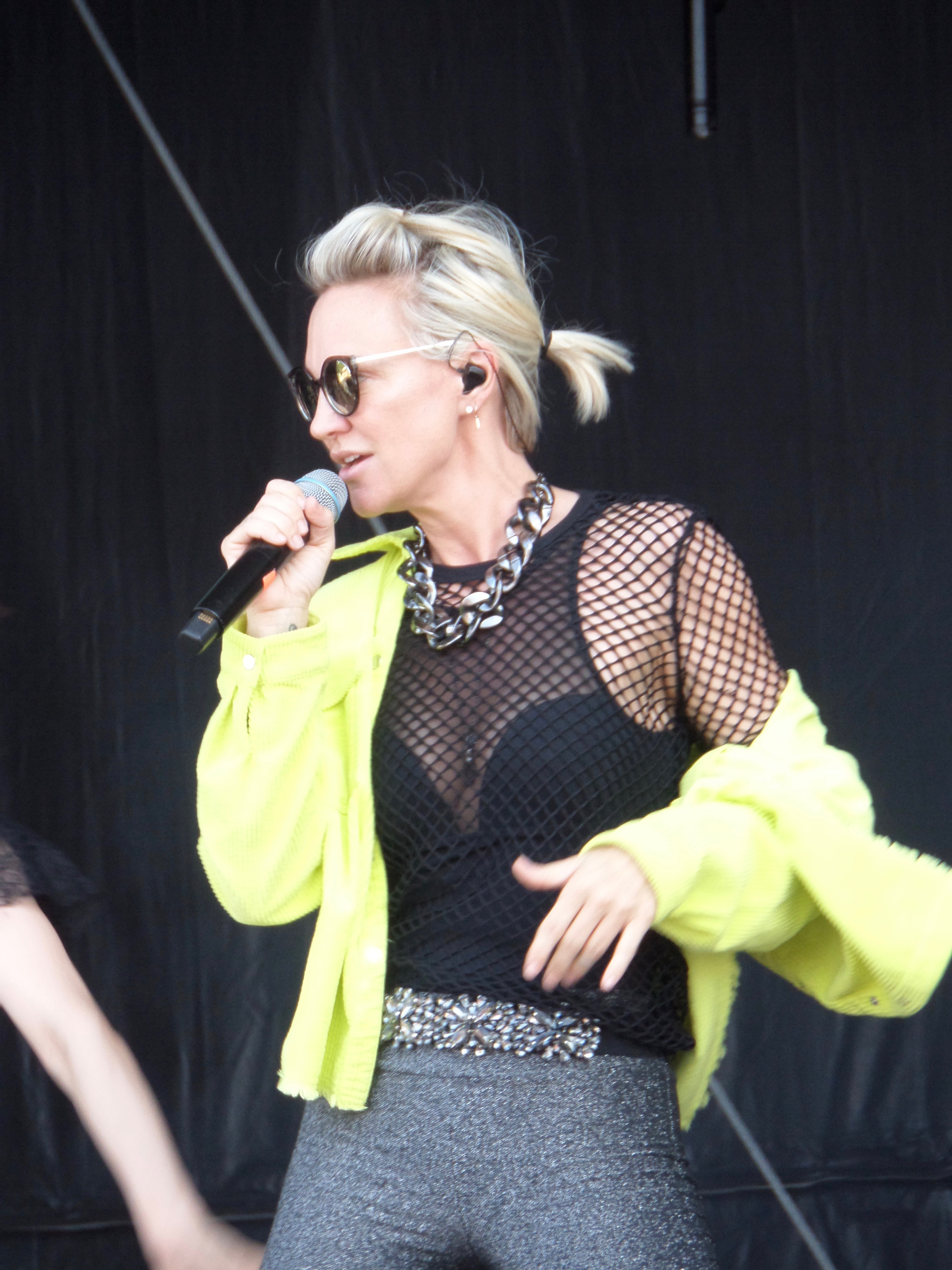
- Ryan in 2019
- Studio albums: 5
- Compilation albums: 2
- Singles: 29
- Music videos: 26

Belgian singer Kate Ryan has released five studio albums, two compilation albums and twenty-nine singles.

== Career ==
She signed in with Belgian department of EMI and released her first album Different in 2002 exclusively in Europe. The album went Gold and Platinum in a number of countries, selling more than 250,000 copies throughout Europe. Two final singles off Different, "Mon cœur résiste encore" and "Libertine" (the first one being a French version of "Scream for More", the latter a second cover of Farmer's number) also turned out a chart success.

Kate's records were released in the USA under Robbins Entertainment label. In 2004, Ryan released a second album in Europe, entitled Stronger, that also contained her remarkable dance-pop style. The album's lead single, "Only If I" met with a modest success across Europe. A cover of Cock Robin's "The Promise You Made" became the second single, earning even greater success. It was also recorded in French as "La Promesse". Pop ballad "Goodbye" was released as the third single, meeting with considerable success.

In 2005 Kate Ryan's music appeared in North America on Water Music Records. In 2006 the singer participated in Eurosong '06, the national final to select the entrant for Belgium in the Eurovision Song Contest 2006. She was selected as the entrant after placing first in the Eurosong final on 9 March 2006. Ryan represented Belgium at the Eurovision semi-final held on 18 May 2006 in Athens singing "Je t'adore". However, she did not qualify for the final, finishing two places outside the advancing Top 10 (12th) with 69 points.

In 2007, she had some success with the double-sided single "Voyage Voyage"/"We All Belong". The track "Voyage Voyage" was a cover of the 1986 European smash hit by Desireless, and "We All Belong" was selected as the official anthem for the EuroGames 2007 in Antwerp. In 2008, Ryan released two singles: "L.I.L.Y. (Like I Love You)" and then "Ella, elle l'a", a cover of France Gall's song. Both tracks (as well as "Voyage Voyage" and "We All Belong") were included on her album Free, which was released in the middle of the year.

2009 saw the release of the concept album French Connection. It was a compilation consisting of French-language-only material, including Ryan's previous hits recordings, and adding some new recordings. "Évidemment" and "Babacar", both from France Gall's repertoire, were released as singles, but only met with limited success, as did the album. The singer announced that French Connection was the end of an era, and from now on she will only release material written by her. She received a Multi-Platinum award from Spain for selling more than 300.000 digital songs. Ryan's next album, Electroshock, was released on 25 June 2012, preceded by three singles "Lovelife", "Broken" and "Robots". Electroshock was delayed by almost a year, hampered mainly by production issues between the artist and her record company.

== Albums ==
=== Studio albums ===
| Title | Album details | Chart positions | | | | | | | | | | Certifications |
| Title | Album details | BEL | GER | SWI | POL | AUT | SWE | NL | POR | DEN | FIN | Certifications |
|---|---|---|---|---|---|---|---|---|---|---|---|---|
| Different | Released: June 21, 2002; Label: EMI Belgium | 8 | 23 | 14 | 15 | 26 | 17 | 88 | 18 | 22 | 36 | POL: Platinum; SWI: Gold |
| Stronger | Released: March 26, 2004; Label: EMI Belgium | 22 | 13 | 13 | 10 | 43 | — | — | — | — | — | POL: Gold |
| Alive | Released: 18 September 2006; Label: EMI Belgium | 13 | 73 | 73 | — | — | — | — | — | — | — | |
| Free | Released: 30 May 2008; Label: ARS | 4 | 47 | 96 | 20 | — | 35 | 66 | — | — | — | POL: Gold |
| Electroshock | Released: 25 June 2012; Label: ARS | 6 | — | — | — | — | — | — | — | — | — | |

=== Compilations ===
| Title | Album details | Peak chart positions | | | Certifications |
| Title | Album details | BEL | CZ | ESP | Certifications |
|---|---|---|---|---|---|
| Essential | Released: June 2008; Label: EMI Belgium | 88 | 23 | — | |
| French Connection | Released: October 13, 2009; Label: ARS | 21 | — | 89 | |

== Singles ==
| Year | Title | Chart positions | | | | | | | | | | Album |
| Year | Title | BEL | GER | SWI | AUT | SWE | NL | DEN | FIN | NOR | SPA | Album |
|---|---|---|---|---|---|---|---|---|---|---|---|---|
| 2001 | "Scream for More" | 9 | — | — | 15 | — | 57 | 12 | — | — | — | Different |
| 2001 | "UR (My Love)" | 17 | — | — | — | — | — | — | — | — | — | Different |
| 2002 | "Désenchantée" | 1 | 2 | 11 | 3 | 4 | 4 | 12 | — | 3 | 7 | Different |
| 2002 | "Mon cœur résiste encore" | 7 | 27 | 35 | — | — | 58 | — | — | — | 2 | Different |
| 2002 | "Libertine" | 7 | 7 | 26 | 7 | 16 | — | 15 | 20 | 15 | 19 | Different |
| 2003 | "Only If I" | 16 | 27 | 34 | 25 | 37 | — | — | — | — | 8 | Stronger |
| 2004 | "The Promise You Made" | 8 | — | — | — | — | — | — | — | — | — | Stronger |
| 2004 | "La Promesse" | — | 19 | 50 | 21 | — | — | — | — | — | — | Stronger |
| 2004 | "Goodbye" | 30 | 52 | 93 | 47 | — | — | — | — | — | — | Stronger |
| 2006 | "Je t'adore" | 1 | 26 | 65 | 38 | 21 | 56 | — | — | — | — | Alive |
| 2006 | "Alive" | 4 | 42 | — | 54 | — | — | — | 8 | — | — | Alive |
| 2006 | "All for You" | 37 | — | — | — | — | — | — | — | — | — | Alive |
| 2007 | "Voyage Voyage" | 2 | 13 | — | 26 | 26 | 11 | — | 10 | — | 6 | Free |
| 2008 | "L.I.L.Y. (Like I Love You)" | 12 | — | — | — | — | — | — | — | — | — | Free |
| 2008 | "Ella elle l'a" | 7 | 10 | 50 | 23 | 2 | 2 | 29 | — | 9 | 2 | Free |
| 2008 | "I Surrender" | 27 | — | — | — | — | 44 | — | — | — | — | Free |
| 2009 | "Your Eyes" | — | — | — | — | — | 80 | — | — | — | — | Free |
| 2009 | "Babacar" | 17 | 28 | — | 53 | 27 | — | — | — | — | 21 | French Connection |
| 2009 | "Évidemment" | 27 | — | — | — | — | — | — | — | — | — | French Connection |
| 2011 | "Lovelife" | 21 | — | — | — | — | 72 | — | — | — | 28 | Electroshock |
| 2011 | "Broken" (featuring Narco) | 30 | — | — | — | — | — | — | — | — | — | Electroshock |
| 2012 | "Robots" | 12 | — | — | — | — | — | — | — | — | — | Electroshock |
| 2013 | "Light in the Dark" | 27 | — | — | — | — | — | — | — | — | — | Non-album singles |
| 2013 | "Heart Flow" | 30 | — | — | — | — | — | — | — | — | — | Non-album singles |
| 2014 | "Not Alone" | 23 | — | — | — | — | — | — | — | — | — | Non-album singles |
| 2015 | "Runaway (Smalltown Boy)" | 23 | — | — | — | — | — | — | — | — | — | Non-album singles |
| 2016 | "Wonderful Life" | 30 | — | — | — | — | — | — | — | — | — | Non-album singles |
| 2016 | "Comment te dire adieu" | 8 | — | — | — | — | — | — | — | — | — | Non-album singles |
| 2018 | "Bring Me Down" | — | — | — | — | — | — | — | — | — | — | Non-album singles |
| 2019 | "Wild Eyes" | 55 | — | — | — | — | — | — | — | — | — | Non-album singles |
| 2020 | "Holiday" | — | — | — | — | — | — | — | — | — | — | Non-album singles |
| 2025 | "Casser la voix" | — | — | — | — | — | — | — | — | — | — | Non-album singles |

== Other appearances ==
| Year | Title | Album |
|---|---|---|
| 2002 | "Oh Baby I..." (Esther Sels, Kate Ryan, Linda Mertens, Maaike Moens & Pascale Feront) | Donnamour 9 |
| 2007 | "Spoiled" (Regi feat. Kate Ryan) | Registrated |
| 2008 | "Caminaré" (Soraya Arnelas feat. Kate Ryan) | Sin Miedo |
| 2012 | "Little Braveheart" (Charlotte Perrelli feat. Kate Ryan) | The Girl |
| 2012 | "The Next Road" (DJ Nano feat. Kate Ryan and D-MOL) | |
| 2013 | "Karma" (Robert Abigail & Kate Ryan) | |
| 2013 | "Sé que tu lluitaràs" | El disc de la Marató 2013 (TV3) |
| 2019 | "Gold" (Sam Feldt x Kate Ryan) | |

== Music videos ==
| Year | Title | Album | Director(s) |
|---|---|---|---|
| 2002 | "Désenchantée" | Different | Peter van Eyndt |
| 2002 | "Scream for More" | Different | Peter van Eyndt |
| 2002 | "Mon cœur résiste encore" | Different | Peter van Eyndt |
| 2002 | "Libertine" | Different | Tarik Hamdine |
| 2004 | "Only If I" | Stronger | Oliver Sommer |
| 2004 | "The Promise You Made" | Stronger | Oliver Sommer |
| 2004 | "La promesse" | Stronger | Oliver Sommer |
| 2004 | "Goodbye" | Stronger | Peter van Eyndt |
| 2006 | "Je t'adore" | Alive | Senol Korkmaz |
| 2006 | "Alive" | Alive | |
| 2006 | "All for You" | Alive | Senol Korkmaz |
| 2007 | "Voyage, voyage" | Free | Peter van Eyndt |
| 2008 | "L.I.L.Y. (Like I Love You)" | Free | Peter van Eyndt |
| 2008 | "Ella, elle l'a" | Free | Oliver Sommer |
| 2008 | "I Surrender" | Free | Oliver Sommer |
| 2009 | "Babacar" | French Connection | Oliver Sommer |
| 2009 | "Évidemment" | French Connection | |
| 2011 | "LoveLife" | Electroshock | Oliver Sommer |
| 2011 | "Broken" | Electroshock | Oliver Sommer |
| 2012 | "Robots" | Electroshock | |
| 2015 | "Runaway (Smalltown Boy)" | Non-album single | |
| 2016 | "Comment te dire adieu" | Non-album single | |
| 2019 | "Wild Eyes" | Non-album single | |
| 2025 | "Casser la voix" | Non-album single | |
