= List of songs recorded by Kate Ryan =

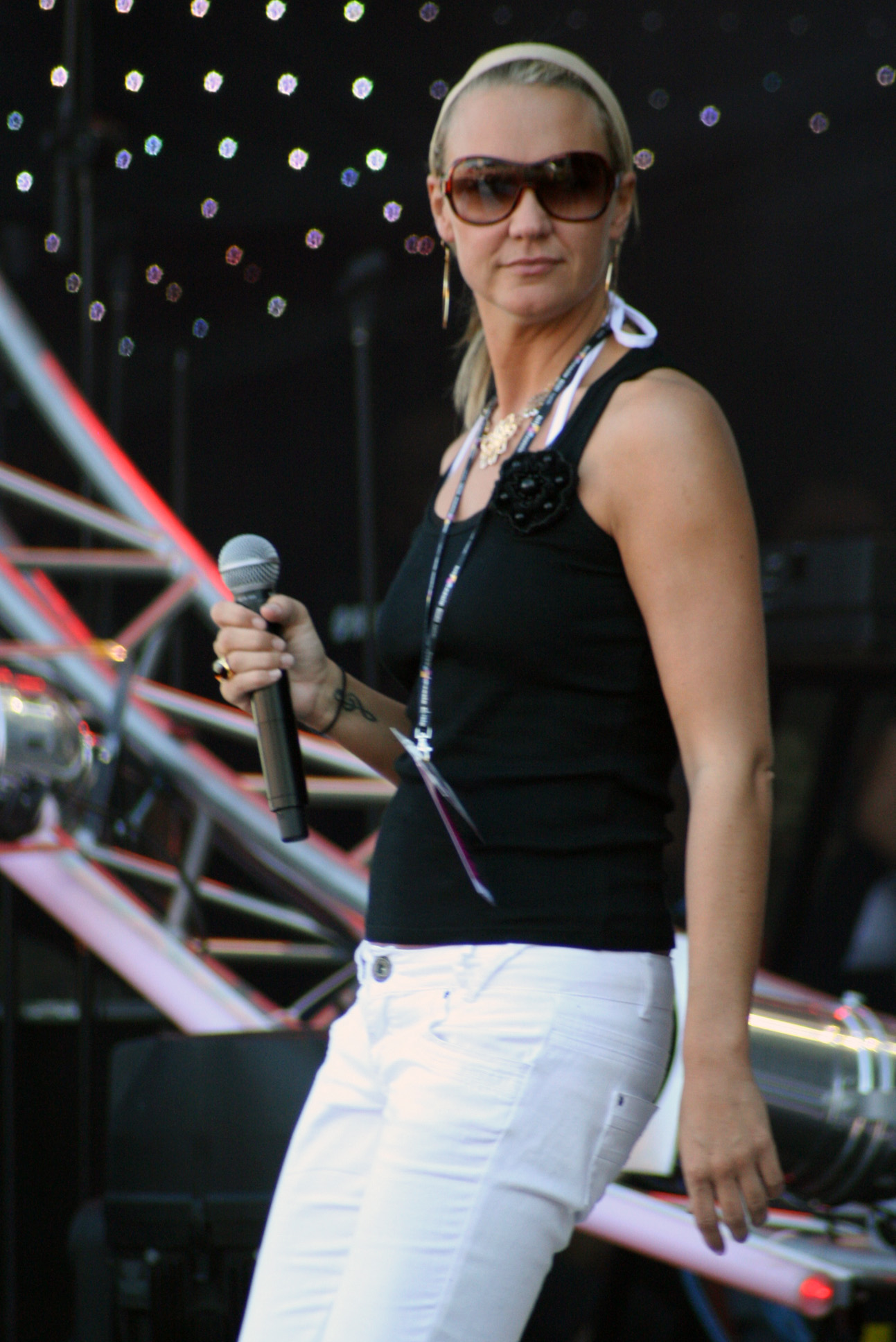
Kate Ryan in 2007

The discography of Kate Ryan, a Belgian World Music Award winner, consists of five studio albums, two Compilation albums and twenty two singles.

Signed by EMI Belgium, Ryan released her debut album in 2002 Different, which contains singles "Désenchantée" and "Libertine" (both covers of Mylène Farmer's songs) and Mon cœur résiste encore, French version of her first single "Scream for More". In 2006, she released Alive which contained "Je t'adore", the song for her performance on the 2006 Eurovision Song Contest. In 2009 she released a concept album, French Connection, which contained her French-language greatest hits.

== Released songs ==
Key
†	Indicates single release
‡	Indicates promotional single release

Title song	Artist(s)	Album	Writer	Year	Ref.
"À La Folie"	Kate Ryan	Free	Jeanette Olsson, Niclas Kings, Niklas Bergwall, Jim Dyke, Jo Lemaire	2008	
"Alive" †	Kate Ryan	Alive	Dobre, DJ Zki, Victoria Horn	2006	
"Alive"(French Version)	Kate Ryan	Alive (album); Alive (single)	Dobre, DJ Zki, Victoria Horn, Jean-Pierre Sluys	2006	
"All for You" †	Kate Ryan	Alive	Kate Ryan, Ashley Cadell, B. J. Caruana, Niclas Kings, Niklas Bergwall	2006	
"Another Day"	Kate Ryan	Stronger	Andy Janssens, Phil Wilde, Steven Tracey	2004	
"Babacar" †	Kate Ryan	French Connection	Michel Berger	2009	
"Believer"	Kate Ryan	Electroshock	Kate Ryan, Anders Hansson, Felix Persson, Märta Grauers	2012	
"Bring Me Down" †	Kate Ryan	Non-album single	Kate Ryan, Matthew James Humphrey, Franck Sanders, Tanika Tabitha	2018	
"Broken" †	Kate Ryan and Narco	Electroshock	Kate Ryan, Anders Hansson, Negin Djafari	2011	
"Caminaré / Je m'en irai"	Soraya Arnelas and Kate Ryan	Sin miedo French Connection	Jordi Campoi, Toni Ten	2008	
"Can You Fix This?"	Kate Ryan	Stronger	Kate Ryan, Andy Janssens, Phil Wilde, Wanda Walker Janssens	2004	
"Casser la voix" †	Kate Ryan	Non-album single	Patrick Bruel, Gérard Maurice Henri Presgurvic	2025	
"Combien de fois"	Kate Ryan	Alive	Kate Ryan, Niclas Kings, Niklas Bergwall, Jeanette Olsson, Jean Pierre Sluys	2006	
"Comment te dire adieu" †	Kate Ryan	Non-album single	Serge Gainsbourg, Arnold Goland, Jack Gold	2016	
"Crazyville"	Kate Ryan	Electroshock	Sarah West, Ketil Schei, Mats Lie Skaare	2012	
"Désenchantée" †	Kate Ryan	Different	Laurent Boutonnat, Mylène Farmer	2002	
"Driving Away"	Kate Ryan	Alive; Je t'adore	Yves Jongen	2006	
"Electroshock"	Kate Ryan	Electroshock	Adrian Zagoritis, Torsten Stenzel, Angela Heldmann	2012	
"Ella elle l'a" †	Kate Ryan	Free	Michel Berger	2008	
"Everytime"	Kate Ryan	Electroshock	Anders Hansson, Negin Djafari	2012	
"Évidemment †	Kate Ryan	French Connection	Michel Berger	2009	
"Free"	Kate Ryan	Free	Kate Ryan	2008	
"Free Your Mind	Kate Ryan	Different	Nina Babet, Phil Wilde	2002	
"Goodbye" †	Kate Ryan	Stronger	Kate Ryan, Phil Wilde	2004	
"Gold" †	Sam Feldt and Kate Ryan	Non-album single	Will Knox, Sam Renders, Dominic Lyttle, Milou van Egmond	2019	
"Got to Move On"	Kate Ryan	Different	Kate Ryan, Phil Wilde	2002	
"Karma" †	Robert Abigail and Kate Ryan	Non-album single	Patrick Robert Abergel, Katrien Verbeeck	2013	
"Hard to Reveal"	Kate Ryan	Stronger	Kate Ryan, Andy Jansenss, Phil Wilde, Wanda Walker Jansenss	2004	
"Hands Up"	Kate Ryan	Stronger	Kate Ryan, Andy Janssens, Phil Wilde, Steven Tracey	2004	
"Head Down"	Kate Ryan	Different	Kate Ryan	2002	
"Heart Flow †	Kate Ryan	Non-album single	Kate Ryan, Negin Djafari, Thomas Gustafsson, Hugo Lira, Ian Mack, Ian-Paolo Lira	2013	
"Holiday" †	Kate Ryan	Non-album single	Lisa Stevens, Curtis Hudson	2020	
"How Many Times"	Kate Ryan	Alive	Kate Ryan, Niclas Kings, Niklas Bergwall, Jeanette Olsson	2006	
"Hurry Up"	Kate Ryan	Stronger; Only If I	Kate Ryan, Andy Janssens, Phil Wilde	2004	
"I Like the Way"	Kate Ryan	Stronger	Kate Ryan, Andy Janssens, Phil Wilde, Steven Tracey	2004	
"I Surrender" †	Kate Ryan	Free	Darren Tate, Victoria Horn	2008	
"In Your Eyes"	Kate Ryan	Different	Andy Janssens, Nina Babet, Phil Wilde	2002	
"Je donnerais tout"	Kate Ryan	Alive; All for You	Kate Ryan, Ashley Cadell, BJ Caruana, Niclas Kings, Niklas Bergwall, Jean-Pierre Sluys	2006	
"Je lance un appel"	Kate Ryan	Stronger	Phil Wilde, Marc Gilson	2004	
"Je t'adore" †	Kate Ryan	Alive	Kate Ryan, Niclas Kings, Niklas Bergwall, Lisa Greene	2006	
"Je t'adore" (French Version)	Kate Ryan	Alive	Kate Ryan, Niclas Kings, Niklas Bergwall, Lisa Greene, Jean-Pierre Sluys	2006	
"L.I.L.Y. †	Kate Ryan	Free; Ella elle l'a	Niklas Bergwall, Jim Dyke, Niclas Kings, Jeanette Olsson	2008	
"La promesse †	Kate Ryan	Stronger (German edition); The Promise You Made	Peter Kingsbery, Jo Lemaire	2004	
"Leave It Alone"	Kate Ryan	Electroshock	Kate Ryan, Anders Hansson, Sharon Vaughn	2012	
"Les Divas du dancing"	Kate Ryan	French Connection	Philippe Cataldo, Jean Schultheis	2009	
"Libertine" †	Kate Ryan	Different (re-release)	Laurent Boutonnat, Jean-Claude Déquéant	2002	
"Lift Me Higher"	Kate Ryan	Different	Kate Ryan, Phil Wilde	2002	
"Light in the Dark" †	Kate Ryan	Non-album single	Kate Ryan, Ivan Lisinski, Bruno Lopez, Ninos Hanna, Robert Hanna	2013	
"Little Braveheart"	Charlotte Perrelli and Kate Ryan	The Girl; Electroshock	Fredrik Kempe, Alexander Jonsson	2012	
"LoveLife" †	Kate Ryan	Electroshock	Wolfgang Schrödl, Paul Drew, Greig Watts, Pete Barringer, Georgie Dennis	2011	
"Love or Lust"	Kate Ryan	Alive	Yves Jongen	2006	
"Madness"	Kate Ryan	Electroshock	Kate Ryan, Anders Hansson, Negin Djafari	2012	
"Magical Love"	Kate Ryan	Different	Kate Ryan, Andy Janssens	2002	
"Mon cœur résiste encore" †	Kate Ryan	Different	Kate Ryan, Andy Janssens, Thierry Bidjeck	2002	
"Ne Baisse Pas La Tête"	Kate Ryan	Different	Kate Ryan, Marc Gilson	2002	
"Nos Regards Qui M'Enflamment"	Kate Ryan	Different	Andy Janssens, Nina Babet, Thierry Bidjeck	2002	
"Not Alone" †	Kate Ryan	Non-album single	Kate Ryan, Benoît Mansion, Jérôme Riouffreyt, Gino Barletta, Andras Vleminckx, Angelica Vasilcov, Bert Elliott, Brett McGaulin	2014	
"Nothing"	Kate Ryan	Alive (album); Alive (single)	Kate Ryan, Yves Jongen	2006	
"Oh Baby I..."	Esther Sels, Kate Ryan, Linda Mertens, Maaike Moens and Pascale Feront	Donnamour 9	Tommy Faragher, Lotti Golden	2002	
"One Happy Day"	Kate Ryan	Different	Kate Ryan, Andy Janssens	2002	
"One More Time"	Kate Ryan	Electroshock	Ian Curnow, Paul Drew, Greig Watts, Pete Barringer, Paul Clarke, Matt Lee	2012	
"Only If I" †	Kate Ryan	Stronger	Jeanette Olsson, Niclas Kings, Niklas Bergwall	2004	
"Pour quel amour"	Kate Ryan	Free	Lisa Greene, Niclas Kings, Niklas Bergwall, Jo Lemaire	2008	
"Put My Finger on It"	Kate Ryan	Free	Jeanette Olsson, Niclas Kings, Niklas Bergwall	2008	
"Robots" †	Kate Ryan	Electroshock	Pascal Languirand, Greig Watts, Paul Drew, Pete Barringer	2012	
"Run Away"	Tim Berg and Kate Ryan	Electroshock	Tim Bergling, Oliver Ingrosso, Otto Jettmann	2012	
"Runaway (Smalltown Boy)" †	Kate Ryan	Non-album single	Steve Bronski, James William Somerville, Lawrence Charles Anthony Cole	2015	
"Running Away"	Kate Ryan	Electroshock	Ian Curnow, Paul Drew, Greig Watts, Pete Barringer, Paul Clarke, Matt Lee, Lisa Marie Keegan	2012	
"Sage comme une image"	Kate Ryan	French Connection	Hagen Dierks, Hay Alanski	2009	
"Scream & Shout"	Kate Ryan	Stronger	Kate Ryan, Andy Janssens, Phil Wilde, Steven Tracey	2004	
"Scream for More" †	Kate Ryan	Different	Kate Ryan, Andy Janssens	2001	
"So in Love"	Kate Ryan	Different; Libertine; Stronger (North American edition)	Kate Ryan, Phil Wilde, Andy Janssens, Shamrock	2002	
"Spinning Around"	Kate Ryan	Alive	Eric Le Tennen, M. Holm, Xcante	2006	
"Spoiled"	Regi and Kate Ryan	REGIstrated	Regi Penxten, Katrien Verbeeck	2007	
"Start Me Up"	Kate Ryan	Stronger	Kate Ryan, Andy Janssens, Phil Wilde, Steven Tracey	2004	
"Stepping Out"	Kate Ryan	Alive	Yves Jongen	2006	
"Sweet Mistake"	Kate Ryan	Free	Jeanette Olsson, Niclas Kings, Niklas Bergwall, Jim Dyke	2008	
"Take Me Down"	Kate Ryan	Free	Ashley Cadell, Niclas Kings, Niklas Bergwall	2008	
"Tapping on the Table"	Kate Ryan	Alive	Yves Jongen	2006	
"Tes Yeux"	Kate Ryan	Free; Your Eyes	Kate Ryan, Niclas Kings, Niklas Bergwall, Jeanette Olsson, Jo Lemaire	2008	
"That Kiss I Miss"	Kate Ryan	Alive	Kate Ryan, Yves Jongen	2006	
"The Promise You Made" †	Kate Ryan	Stronger	Peter Kingsbery	2004	
"The Rain"	Kate Ryan	Stronger	Kate Ryan	2004	
"Through the Eyes"	Kate Ryan	Different	Kate Ryan, Andy Janssens	2002	
"Tonight We Ride / No digas que no"	Kate Ryan and Soraya Arnelas	Free	Ian Curnow, Georgie Dennis, Darren Styles	2008	
"Toute première fois"	Kate Ryan	Free	Jeanne Mas, Romano Musumarra, Roberto Zanelli	2008	
"UR (My Love)" †	Kate Ryan	Different	Kate Ryan, Andy Janssens	2001	
"Voyage voyage" †	Kate Ryan	Free	Jean Michel Rivat, Dominique Dubois	2007	
"Walk to the Beat"	Kate Ryan	Electroshock	Adrian Zagoritis, Jukka Immonen	2012	
"We All Belong"	Kate Ryan	Free; Voyage voyage	Kate Ryan, Niclas Kings, Niklas Bergwall	2007	
"We Belong Together"	Kate Ryan	Stronger	Kate Ryan, Andy Janssens	2004	
"Who Do You Love"	Kate Ryan	Free	Lisa Greene, Niclas Kings, Niklas Bergwall	2008	
"Why Imagine"	Kate Ryan	Alive	Kate Ryan, Niclas Kings, Niklas Bergwall, Lisa Greene	2006	
"Wild Eyes" †	Kate Ryan	Non-album single	Hans Francken, Will Knox, Emma Balemans	2019	
"Wonderful Life" †	Kate Ryan	Non-album single	Colin Vearncombe	2016	
"Wonderland"	Kate Ryan	Alive	Kate Ryan, Niclas Kings, Niklas Bergwall, Jeanette Olsson	2006	
"Your Eyes" †	Kate Ryan	Free	Kate Ryan, Niclas Kings, Niklas Bergwall, Jeanette Olsson	2008	
