= French Connection (album) =

Greatest hits album by Kate Ryan
- Released: 13 October 2009
- Length: 58:50
- Language: French
- Label: ARS; Universal
- Producer: AJ Duncan, Phil Wilde, Danny Corten, Mark Carpentier, Toni Ten, Xasqui Ten, Ivan Ten, Niclas Kings, Niklas Bergwall, Yves Gaillard

Kate Ryan chronology
Essential (2008)	French Connection (2009)	Electroshock (2012)

Singles from Free
- 1. "Babacar" Released: June 12, 2009; 2. "Évidemment" Released: October 9, 2009

French Connection is a French-language greatest hits album by Belgian singer Kate Ryan released under ARS Entertainment. The album was released in Canada on October 13, 2009, before being released in Ryan's native country of Belgium on October 23, 2009. The album's lead single, "Babacar", was released June 12, 2009 in Belgium.

This compilation includes all of her French greatest hits, as well as covers (both previously released and unreleased), French singles, French versions of some of her English-language songs, and some new versions of her first hits.

== Track listing ==
French Connection track listing
No.	Title	Writer(s)	Producer(s)	Length
1.	"Ella, elle l'a" (originally by France Gall) (from Free, 2008)	Michel Berger	Niclas Kings; Niklas Bergwall	3:07
2.	"Babacar" (originally by France Gall) (new recording)	Berger	Kings; Bergwall	3:13
3.	"Désenchantée" (Original version) (originally by Mylène Farmer) (from Different, 2002)	Mylène Farmer; Laurent Boutonnat	AJ Duncan; Phil Wilde	3:38
4.	"Libertine" (Original version) (originally by Mylène Farmer) (from Different, 2002)	Boutonnat; Jean-Claude Déquéant	AJ Duncan; Wilde	3:13
5.	"Évidemment" (originally by France Gall) (new recording)	Berger	Yves Gaillard	3:10
6.	"Mon cœur résiste encore" (2009 version*) (from Different, 2002)	Ryan; Andy Janssens; Thierry Bidjeck	Kings; Bergwall	4:10
7.	"La promesse" (french version of "The Promise You Made" by Cock Robin) (from Stronger, 2004)	Peter Kingsbery; Jo Lemaire	AJ Duncan; Phil Wilde	3:27
8.	"Tes Yeux" (from Free, 2008)	Ryan; Jeanette Olsson; Kings; Bergwall; Lemaire	Kings; Bergwall	3:48
9.	"Toute première fois" (originally by Jeanne Mas) (from Free, 2008)	Jeanne Mas; Romano Musumarra; Roberto Zanelli	Kings; Bergwall	4:09
10.	"Les Divas du dancing" (originally by Philippe Cataldo) (new recording)	Philippe Cataldo; Jean Schultheis	Kings; Bergwall	3:26
11.	"Sage comme une image" (originally by Lio) (new recording)	Hagen Dierks; Hay Alanski	Kings; Bergwall	3:05
12.	"Caminaré / Je m'en irai" (featuring Soraya Arnelas) (from Sin miedo, 2008)	Jordi Campoi; Toni Ten	Toni Ten; Xasqui Ten; Ivan Ten	3:30
13.	"Voyage, voyage" (originally by Desireless) (from Free, 2008)	Jean-Michel Rivat; Dominique Dubois	Kings; Bergwall	3:09
14.	"Désenchantée" (2009 version)	Farmer; Boutonnat	Danny Corten; Mark Carpentier	4:09
15.	"Libertine" (2009 version)	Boutonnat; Déquéant	Kings; Bergwall	3:05
16.	"Évidemment" (2N Remix)	Berger	Kings; Bergwall	3:18

(*)Although it's a new version, the covers don't mention that is a new version instead of the original mix or the 2002 Radio Edit.

iTunes Bonus Track:

17. "Voyage Voyage" (Acoustic Version) - 3:05

Limited Edition:

CD1 - Includes the 16 standard tracks as above.
CD2:

1. "Ella elle l'a" (UK Extended)
2. "Babacar" (X-Team Remix)
3. "I Surrender" (PF Pumping Radio Edit)
4. "L.I.L.Y." (Extended)
5. "Megamix" (Containing "Voyage Voyage", "Ella elle l'a", "I Surrender", "Your Eyes")

== Personnel ==
- Katrien Verbeeck a.k.a. Kate Ryan – vocals, lyricist
- Niklas Bergwall – producer, composer, lyricist, mixing
- Niclas Kings – producer, composer, mixing
- Andy Janssens a.k.a. AJ Duncan – producer, composer
- Phil Wilde – producer, composer
- Yves Jongen a.k.a. Yves Gaillard – producer, mastering
- Danny Corten – producer
- Mark Carpentier – producer
- Antonio "Toni" Ten – producer, lyricist
- Francisco "Xasqui" Ten – producer
- Ivan Ten – producer
- Filip Heurckmans – mastering
- Thierry Bidjeck – French translations ("Mon cœur résiste encore")
- Jo Lemaire – French translations ("La Promesse", "Tes Yeux")
- Jeanette Olsson – backing vocals, lyricist
- Jordi Campoy – lyricist

== Charts ==
Weekly chart performance for French Connection
Chart (2009)	Peak position
Belgian Albums (Ultratop Flanders)	21
Spanish Albums (PROMUSICAE)	89

== Release history ==
French Connection release history
Region	Date	Format	Label	Catalogue
Canada	October 13, 2009	CD; digital download	DEP Distribution; Universal Music	2717116
Spain	October 20, 2009	CD; digital download	Vale Music; Universal Music	
Belgium	October 23, 2009	CD; digital download	ARS Entertainment; Universal Music	
Poland	October 30, 2009	CD; digital download	Magic Records; Universal Music	
Germany	November 13, 2009	CD; digital download	Polydor; Universal Music	
