= Free (Kate Ryan album) =

Studio album by Kate Ryan
- Released: 30 May 2008
- Genre: Europop; dance-pop
- Length: 46:19
- Language: English, French
- Label: ARS
- Producer: Niclas Kings; Niklas Bergwall (2N)

Kate Ryan chronology
| Alive (2006) | Free (2008) | Essential (2008) |

Singles from Free
- 1. "Voyage Voyage" Released: July 11, 2007; 2. "L.I.L.Y. (Like I Love You)" Released: February 1, 2008; 3. "Ella, elle l'a" Released: April 25, 2008; 4. "I Surrender" Released: August 27, 2008; 5. "Your Eyes" Released: May 2009

Free is the fourth studio album by Belgian singer Kate Ryan. It was released on May 30, 2008 by ARS Entertainment and Universal Music. It produced the singles, "Voyage Voyage", "L.I.L.Y.", "Ella elle l'a", "I Surrender" and "Your Eyes". Free performed moderately well on the charts and was certified Gold in Poland for shipments of 10,000 copies.

== Critical reception ==
Professional ratings
Review scores
| Source | Rating |
|---|---|
| AllMusic | 4/5 stars |

AllMusic editor John Lucas rated the album four out of five stars. He noted found that Free "is another consistently strong effort. It only once hits the heights of the best tracks from Alive [...] but it is a strong collection of Europop with much less filler than her first two records."

== Track listing ==
All songs produced by Niclas Kings and Niklas Bergwall, collectively known as 2N.

- Original release

| No. | Title | Writer(s) | Length |
|---|---|---|---|
| 1. | "Voyage, voyage" (originally by Desireless) | Jean Michel Rivat; Dominique Dubois | 3:05 |
| 2. | "Ella, elle l'a" (originally by France Gall) | Michel Berger | 3:06 |
| 3. | "I Surrender" (originally by Clea) | Darren Tate; Victoria Horn | 3:31 |
| 4. | "Toute première fois" (originally by Jeanne Mas) | Jeanne Mas; Romano Musumarra; Roberto Zanelli | 4:06 |
| 5. | "Tes Yeux" | Kate Ryan; Niclas Kings; Niklas Bergwall; Jeanette Olsson; Jo Lemaire | 3:44 |
| 6. | "Take Me Down" | Ashley Cadell; Kings; Bergwall | 4:29 |
| 7. | "Pour quel amour" | Lisa Greene; Kings; Bergwall; Lemaire | 3:42 |
| 8. | "Put My Finger on It" | Jeanette Olsson; Kings; Bergwall | 3:31 |
| 9. | "L.I.L.Y." | Olsson; Kings; Bergwall; Jim Dyke | 3:15 |
| 10. | "A La Folie" | Olsson; Kings; Bergwall; Dyke; Lemaire | 3:55 |
| 11. | "We All Belong" | Ryan; Kings; Bergwall | 3:28 |
| 12. | "Tonight We Ride / No digas que no" (featuring Soraya Arnelas) | Ian Curnow; Georgie Dennis; Darren Styles | 3:03 |
| 13. | "Free" | Ryan | 3:29 |

- Second edition

| No. | Title | Writer(s) | Length |
|---|---|---|---|
| 1. | "Voyage, voyage" | Rivat; Dubois | 3:05 |
| 2. | "I Surrender" | Tate; Horn | 3:31 |
| 3. | "Ella, elle l'a" | Berger | 3:06 |
| 4. | "Who Do You Love" | Greene; Kings; Bergwall | 3:42 |
| 5. | "Your Eyes" | Ryan; Kings; Bergwall; Olsson | 3:44 |
| 6. | "L.I.L.Y." | Olsson; Kings; Bergwall; Dyke | 3:15 |
| 7. | "Take Me Down" | Cadell; Kings; Bergwall | 4:29 |
| 8. | "Put My Finger on It" | Olsson; Kings; Bergwall | 3:31 |
| 9. | "Sweet Mistake" | Olsson; Kings; Bergwall; Dyke | 3:55 |
| 10. | "Toute première fois" | Mas; Musumarra; Zanelli | 4:06 |
| 11. | "We All Belong" | Ryan; Kings; Bergwall | 3:28 |
| 12. | "Tonight We Ride / No digas que no" (featuring Soraya Arnelas) | Curnow; Dennis; Styles | 3:03 |
| 13. | "Free" | Ryan | 3:29 |

UK edition only

14. "The Rain"
15. "Je T'Adore"
16. "Libertine"
17. "Désenchantée"
18. "I Surrender" (Chuckle Brothers remix) [iTunes Exclusive]
19. "Ella Ella L'a (English Extended Version)" [iTunes Exclusive]
- Spanish edition
1. "Ella elle l'a" - 3:18
2. "Tonight We Ride / No Digas Que No - 3:05
3. "Voyage Voyage" - 3:09
4. I Surrender" - 3:33
5. "Who Do You Love" - 3:44
6. "Your Eyes" - 3:46
7. "L.I.L.Y." - 3:18
8. "Take Me Down" - 4:32
9. "Put My Finger on It" - 3:33
10. "Sweet Mistake" - 3:58
11. "Toute Première Fois" - 4:08
12. "We All Belong" - 3:31
13. "Free" - 3:31
- Polish Special Edition w/ DVD

All Original edition tracks Plus Music Videos

1. "Voyage Voyage" (Music Video)
2. "L.I.L.Y." (Music Video)
3. "Ella Elle L'a" (Music Video)
4. "I Surrender" (Music Video)
5. "Photo Gallery"

== Personnel ==
- Kate Ryan – Vocals, lyricist
- Niclas Kings – Producer, lyricist
- Niklas Bergwall – Producer, lyricist
- Jeanette Olsson – Backing vocals, vocal arrangement, lyricist
- Anna Nordell – Backing vocals
- Aggie G. – Backing vocals
- Lisa Greene – Lyricist
- Jim Dyke – Lyricist
- Ashley Cadelle – Lyricist
- Ian Curnow – Lyricist
- Georgie Dennis – Lyricist
- Darren Styles – Lyricist
- Jo Lemaire – French translations
- Mattias Bylund – Strings
- Johan Rude – Mixing

== Charts ==
Weekly chart performance for Free
| Chart (2008) | Peak position |
|---|---|
| Belgian Albums (Ultratop Flanders) | 4 |
| Dutch Albums (Album Top 100) | 44 |
| German Albums (Offizielle Top 100) | 47 |
| Spanish Albums (Promusicae) | 26 |
| Swedish Albums (Sverigetopplistan) | 35 |
| Swiss Albums (Schweizer Hitparade) | 96 |

== Certifications ==
Certifications for Free
| Region | Certification | Certified units/sales |
|---|---|---|
| Poland (ZPAV) | Gold | 10,000^{*} |
^{*} Sales figures based on certification alone.
