= Broken (Kate Ryan song) =

Single by Kate Ryan featuring Narco

from the album Electroshock
- Released: 7 October 2011 (Belgium)
- Recorded: 2011
- Genre: Dance-pop, eurodance
- Length: 3:30
- Label: ARS/Universal
- Songwriters: Anders Hansson, Kate Ryan, Negin Djafari, Bernard Ansong
- Producers: Anders Hansson, Felix Persson, Märta Grauers (additional production by Andras Vleminckx & Jérôme "Deekly" Riouffreyt)

Kate Ryan singles chronology
"LoveLife" (2011)	"Broken" (2011)	"Robots" (2012)

Audio video
- "Broken" on YouTube

"Broken" is the second single from Kate Ryan's album, Electroshock. It was in Belgium on iTunes on 7 October 2011. The song is written By Anders Hansson, Kate Ryan, Negin Djafari, Bernard Ansong and was produced by Anders Hansson, Felix Persson and Märta Grauers with additional production of Andras Vleminckx & Jérôme "Deekly" Riouffreyt. The song features vocals from Narcz Privé a.k.a. Narco.

On 27 June 2012, as a celebration of the release of the album, Ryan shared via her Facebook page the original version of the song, which does not include Narco's vocals. This version is now available on Kate Ryan's SoundCloud page.

== Track listing ==
Digital download - Single

1. "Broken" (feat. Narco) - 3:30

Digital Remixes EP

1. "Broken" (Eightysix & Deekly Radio Edit) - 3:46
2. "Broken" (Jellow's Funkster Remix) - 3:18
3. "Broken" (Nicolaz 4AM Living Room Remix) - 5:38
4. "Broken" (AMRO's Touch Remix) - 6:52
5. "Broken" (Dany Otton Iberian Remix) - 3:50

== Chart performance ==
Chart (2011)	Peak position
Belgium (Ultratop 50 Flanders)	30

== Release history ==
Region	Date	Format	Label
Belgium	7 October 2011	Digital Download	ARS/Universal
