= Stronger (Kate Ryan album) =

Studio album by Kate Ryan
- Released: March 26, 2004
- Length: 57:02
- Label: EMI Belgium
- Producers: AJ Duncan; Martin Hanzén; Jimmy Thörnfeldt; Phil Wilde

Kate Ryan chronology
Different (2002)	Stronger (2004)	Alive (2006)

Singles from Stronger
- 1. "Only If I" Released: February 21, 2004; 2. "The Promise You Made/La Promesse" Released: June 12, 2004; 3. "Goodbye" Released: November 06, 2004

Stronger is the second studio album by Belgian singer Kate Ryan, released in 2004 in Europe and 2005 in the United States.

Stronger includes the hits singles "Only If I", "The Promise You Made", and "Goodbye".

== Track listing ==
"Hurry Up" was produced by Martin Hanzén and Jimmy Thörnfeldt; all other songs were produced by AJ Duncan and Phil Wilde

No.	Title	Writer(s)	Length
1.	"Another Day"	Andy Janssens; Phil Wilde; Steven Tracey	4:43
2.	"Only If I"	Jeanette Olsson; Niclas Kings; Niklas Bergwall	3:52
3.	"Je lance un appel"	Wilde; Marc Gilson	4:04
4.	"The Promise You Made" (originally by Cock Robin)	Peter Kingsbery	3:28
5.	"Hands Up"	Kate Ryan; Janssens; Wilde; Tracey	3:43
6.	"I Like the Way"	Ryan; Janssens; Wilde; Tracey	3:42
7.	"Scream & Shout"	Ryan; Janssens; Wilde; Tracey	4:25
8.	"Can You Fix This?"	Ryan; Janssens; Wilde; Wanda Walker Janssens	4:04
9.	"Start Me Up"	Ryan; Janssens; Wilde; Tracey	3:33
10.	"Hurry Up"	Ryan; Janssens; Wilde	3:14
11.	"The Rain"	Ryan	3:21
12.	"We Belong Together"	Ryan; Janssens	3:56
13.	"Hard to Reveal"	Kate Ryan; Janssens; Wilde; Walker Janssens	4:09
14.	"Goodbye"	Ryan; Wilde	3:42

German bonus track
No.	Title	Writer(s)	Length
15.	"La promesse"	Kingsbery; Jo Lemaire	3:29

2005 North American edition by Water Music Dance
No.	Title	Writer(s)	Length
15.	"The Promise You Made" (Extended Version)	Kingsbery	6:00
16.	"So In Love"	Ryan; Janssens; Wilde; Shamrock	3:49
17.	"Libertine" (French lyrics)	Laurent Boutonnat; Jean-Claude Déquéant	6:42

== Personnel ==
- Kate Ryan – Vocals, lyricist
- Andy Janssens a.k.a. AJ Duncan – Producer, lyricist, conductor, pre–producer, keyboards, synths & protocols programming
- Phil Wilde – Producer, lyricist, conductor, keyboards, synths & protocols programming
- Martin Hanzén – Producer
- Jimmy Thörnfeldt – Producer
- Steven Tracey – Lyricist
- Niklas Bergwall – Lyricist
- Niclas Kings – Lyricist
- Jeanette Olsson – Lyricist
- Marc Gilson – Lyricist
- Wanda Walker Janssens – Lyricist
- Jo Lemaire – French translations ("La Promesse")
- Mieke Aerts – Backing vocals
- Jody Pijper – Backing vocals
- Patrick Vinx – Backing vocals
- Peter Bauwens – Backing vocals
- Eric Melaerts – Guitars
- Patrick Hamilton – Acoustic piano & strings arrangement
- Peter Bulkens – Mixing
- Sander van der Heide – Mastering
- Ivo Kljuce – Photography
- Bea Brych – Make–up

== Charts ==
Weekly chart performance for Stronger
Chart (2004)	Peak position
Austrian Albums (Ö3 Austria)	43
Belgian Albums (Ultratop Flanders)	22
German Albums (Offizielle Top 100)	13
Swiss Albums (Schweizer Hitparade)	14

== Certifications ==
Certifications for Stronger
Region	Certification	Certified units/sales
Poland (ZPAV)	Gold	20,000^{*}
^{*} Sales figures based on certification alone.
