= Alive (Kate Ryan song) =

Single by Kate Ryan

from the album Alive
- B-side: "Nothing"
- Released: 26 August 2006
- Recorded: 2006
- Genre: House
- Length: 3:30
- Label: EMI
- Songwriters: DJ Zki, Dobre, Victoria Horn
- Producer: Philip Dirix

Kate Ryan singles chronology
"Je t'adore" (2006)	"Alive" (2006)	"All for You" (2007)

Music video
- "Alive" on YouTube

"Alive", is the second official single from Alive, the third album from Belgian artist Kate Ryan, released 26 August 2006. The song was written by DJ Zki, Dobre and Victoria Horn, and it was produced by Philip Dirix. It was featured amongst the music on the website for Abercrombie & Fitch.

== Formats and track listings ==
CD Single

1. "Alive" - 3:31
2. "Alive" (French Version) - 3:31
3. "Nothing" - 3:28

== Charts ==
Chart performance for "Alive"
Chart (2004)	Peak position
Austria (Ö3 Austria Top 40)	54
Belgium (Ultratop 50 Flanders)	4
Germany (GfK)	42
Finland (Suomen virallinen lista)	8
