= All for You (Kate Ryan song) =

"All For You"

Single by Kate Ryan

from the album Alive
- B-side: "Je Donnerais Tout"
- Released: November 24, 2006
- Recorded: 2006
- Genre: Electronic, house
- Length: 3:09
- Label: ARS
- Songwriters: Ashley Cadell, B. J. Caruana, Kate Ryan, Niklas Bergwall, Niclas Kings
- Producer: 2N

Kate Ryan singles chronology
"Alive" (2006)	"All For You" (2006)	"Voyage Voyage" (2007)

Audio video
- "All for You" on YouTube

All For You was the third and last single of Kate Ryan's third album Alive.

== Formats and track listings ==
CD Single

1. "All For You" - 3:10
2. "Je Donnerais Tout" - 3:10
3. "All For You" (Extended Version) - 5:24

== Chart performance ==
Chart (2006/2007)	Peak position
Belgian Singles Chart (Flanders) Top 50	37
Spanish Singles Chart Top 100	65
Polish Singles Chart Top 50	26
