= Electroshock (album) =

Studio album by Kate Ryan
- Released: 25 June 2012
- Recorded: Roxy Recordings (Stockholm)
- Length: 46:53
- Label: ARS; Universal
- Producer: Tim Bergling; Märta Grauers; Anders Hansson; Alexander Jonsson; Fredrik Kempe; Felix Persson; Jérôme Riouffreyt; Andras Vleminckx

Kate Ryan chronology
French Connection (2009)	Electroshock (2012)

Singles from Electroshock
- 1. "Lovelife" Released: 11 April 2011; 2. "Broken" Released: 7 October 2011; 3. "Robots" Released: 15 May 2012

Electroshock is the fifth studio album by Belgian singer Kate Ryan. It was released by ARS Entertainment and Universal Music on 25 June 2012 in Belgium. It marked Ryan's first album – after Alive – that does not include any cover version and, also, is entirely in English, except for the version of "Little Braveheart" featured on the album, which has French lyrics sung by Ryan.

== Track listing ==
Electroshock track listing
No.	Title	Writer(s)	Producer(s)	Length
1.	"LoveLife"	Wolfgang Schroedl; Paul Drew; Greig Watts; Pete Barringer; Georgie Dennis	Anders Hansson; Felix Persson; Märta Grauers; Andras Vleminckx^{[a]}; Jérome Riouffreyt^{[a]}	3:42
2.	"Believer"	Kate Ryan; Hansson; Persson; Grauers	Hansson; Persson; Grauers	3:26
3.	"Broken" (featuring Narco)	Ryan; Hansson; Negin Djafari	Hansson; Persson; Grauers; Vleminckx^{[a]}; Riouffreyt^{[a]}	3:30
4.	"Robots"	Pascal Languirand; Watts; Drew; Barringer	Hansson; Persson; Grauers	3:26
5.	"Crazyville"	Sarah West; Ketil Schei; Mats Lie Skaare	Hansson; Persson; Grauers	3:28
6.	"Walk to the Beat"	Adrian Zagoritis; Jukka Immonen	Hansson; Persson; Grauers	3:04
7.	"Electroshock"	Zagoritis; Torsten Stenzel; Angela Geldmann	Hansson; Persson; Grauers; Vleminckx^{[a]}; Riouffreyt^{[a]}	3:08
8.	"One More Time"	Ian Curnow; Drew; Watts; Barringer; Paul Clarke; Matt Lee	Hansson; Persson; Grauers	3:11
9.	"Running Away"	Curnow; Drew; Watts; Barringer; Clarke; Lee; Lisa Marie Keegan	Hansson; Persson; Grauers	3:20
10.	"Madness"	Ryan; Hansson; Djafari	Hansson; Persson; Grauers	03:44
11.	"Leave It Alone"	Ryan; Hansson; Sharon Vaughn	Hansson; Persson; Grauers	3:05
12.	"Everytime"	Hansson; Djafari	Hansson; Persson; Grauers	3:23
13.	"Little Braveheart" (Charlotte Perrelli featuring Kate Ryan)	Fredrik Kempe; Alexander Jonsson	Kempe; Jonsson	3:29
14.	"Run Away" (Tim Berg featuring Kate Ryan)	Bergling; Oliver Ingrosso; Otto Jettmann	Bergling	2:56
Total length:				46:53

Notes

- ^{^[a]} denotes additional producer(s)

Sample credits

- "LoveLife" is based on a riff of the song "Narcotic", written by Wolfgang Schrödl and performed by Liquido.
- "Robots" is based on a riff of the song "Living on Video", written by Pascal Languirand and performed by Trans-X.

== Charts ==
Weekly chart performance for Electroshock
Chart (2008)	Peak position
Belgian Albums (Ultratop Flanders)	6
Belgian Albums (Ultratop Wallonia)	118

== Release history ==
Electroshock release history
Region	Date	Format	Label	Ref(s)
Belgium	25 June 2012	CD; Digital download	ARS; Universal	
