= Scream for More =

Single by Kate Ryan

from the album Different
- Released: February 19, 2001
- Recorded: 2000
- Studio: Soundsational Studio
- Genre: trance
- Length: 4:01
- Label: Antler-Subway
- Songwriters: Kate Ryan, Andy Janssens
- Producers: Phil Wilde, AJ Duncan

Kate Ryan singles chronology
"Scream for More" (2001)	"UR (My Love)" (2001)

Audio video
- "Scream for More" on YouTube

"Scream for More" is the debut single by the female Belgian dance singer Kate Ryan from her debut album Different. It was written by Andy Janssens and Kate Ryan and produced by Janssens and Phil Wilde. It was released on February 19, 2001, in Belgium by Antler-Subway. It peaked at number nine on the charts in her homeland. It was also released in Spain shortly thereafter, where it failed to chart.

After Ryan's international success in 2002 with covers of Désenchantée and Libertine, she released a slightly tweaked version of the song in Europe with little success. She has also recorded the song in French as "Mon Cœur Résiste Encore". It was re-released alongside Désenchantée as a double A-side single in UK in 2003.

== Background and composition ==
"Scream for More" is a vocal trance song written by Andy Janssens and Kate Ryan and produced by Andy Janssens and Phil Wilde, who produced her first two studio albums. The song was recorded and produced at Soundsational Studio in Adegem, Belgium.

== Critical reception ==
John Lucas of AllMusic in his review of Different considered the French version of the song as "outstanding".

== Formats and track listings ==
CD Single

1. "Scream for More" - 4:00
2. "Scream for More" (Original Extended Mix) - 7:51

12" Single

1. "Scream for More" (Original Extended Mix) - 7:51
2. "Scream for More" (Club Dub) - 9:08
3. "Scream for More" (Orphean Remix) - 6:14
4. "Scream for More" (D&A Mix) - 5:50

US Maxi-Single

1. "Scream For More" (Radio Edit) - 3:58
2. "Scream For More" (USA Mix) - 7:50
3. "Scream For More" (Orphean Mix) - 6:14
4. "Scream For More" (D&A Remix) - 5:50
5. "Scream For More" (Club Dub) - 9:08
6. "Scream For More" (Original Extended) - 7:52

UK 12" Single

1. "Scream For More" (Cor Fijneman Remix)
2. "Scream For More" (Monsoon & Dreamwurx Main Mix)
3. "Scream For More" (Monsoon & Dreamwurx Alternative Mix)

== Charts ==
=== Weekly charts ===
Chart (2001–03)	Peak position
Austria (Ö3 Austria Top 40)	15
Belgium (Ultratop 50 Flanders)	9
Denmark (Tracklisten)	12
Netherlands (Single Top 100)	57

=== Year-end charts ===
Chart (2001)	Position
Belgium (Ultratop Flanders)	51
