= Robots (song) =

Single by Kate Ryan

from the album Electroshock
- Released: 12 May 2012 (Belgium)
- Recorded: 2010
- Genre: Dance-pop, disco, eurodance
- Length: 3:26 (Album version); 3:17 (Radio edit)
- Label: ARS/Universal
- Songwriter(s): Pete Barringer, Paul Drew, Pascal Languirand, Greig Watts
- Producer(s): Anders Hansson, Felix Persson, Märta Grauers

Kate Ryan singles chronology
"Broken" (2011)	"Robots" (2012)	"Light in the Dark" (2013)

Audio video
- "Robots" on YouTube

"Robots" is the third single from Kate Ryan's fifth studio album Electroshock. It was released in Belgium via iTunes on 12 May 2012. The song's melody is based on the riff of the song Living on Video by Trans-X.

== Track listing ==
Digital download - single

1. "Robots" (radio edit) - 3:17
2. "Robots" (extended version) - 5:28
3. "Robots" (Shutterz remix) - 6:14
4. "Robots" (Chris Feelding remix) - 4:47
5. "Robots" (William Burstedt) - 3:33

== Chart performance ==
Chart (2012)	Peak position
Belgium (Ultratip Bubbling Under Flanders)	12

== Release history ==
Region	Date	Format	Label
Belgium	12 May 2012	Digital Download	ARS/Universal
