= Alive (Kate Ryan album) =

Studio album by Kate Ryan
- Released: 15 September 2006
- Length: 60:16
- Language: English, French
- Label: EMI Belgium
- Producer: Niclas Kings; Niklas Bergwall; Philip Dirix; Yves Gaillard; Eduardo Delvino

Kate Ryan chronology
Stronger (2004)	Alive (2006)	Free (2008)

Singles from Alive
- 1. "Je t'adore" Released: February 25, 2006; 2. "Alive" Released: August 26, 2006; 3. "All for You" Released: December 16, 2006

Alive is the third studio album by Belgian singer Kate Ryan. It was released by EMI on 15 September 2006, followed by a release in the United States in April 2008. Primarily produced by Philip Dirix, Yves Gaillard, and duo Niclas Kings and Niklas Bergwall, the album includes the singles, "Je t'adore", "Alive" and "All for You".

== Critical reception ==
Professional ratings
Review scores
Source	Rating
AllMusic	4/5 stars

AllMusic editor John Lucas rated the album four out of five stars. He noted Alive was "notably less club-oriented than its predecessors, instead aiming for a modern pop sound" and called it her by "far her strongest, lacking the filler that weighed down her first two. Indeed almost any of the 13 tracks could have been strong singles in their own right, something that could certainly not have been said of Different or Stronger [...] All in all, Alive is an underrated set."

== Chart performance ==
Alive debuted at number 45 on the Flemish Albums Chart and eventually peaked at number 13 in its third week of release. It marked a return to the top 20 after Ryan's previous album Stronger (2004) had reached the top 30 in the region only. In Germany and Switzerland, where Stronger had peaked at number 13, Alive underperformed, only reaching number 73 in both countries.

== Track listing ==
Alive track listing
No.	Title	Writer(s)	Producer(s)	Length
1.	"Je t'adore"	Kate Ryan; Niclas Kings; Niklas Bergwall; Lisa Greene	Kings; Bergwall	3:07
2.	"All for You"	Ryan; Ashley Cadell; B. J. Caruana; Kings; Bergwall	Kings; Bergwall	3:10
3.	"Alive"	Dobre; DJ Zki; Victoria Horn	Philip Dirix	3:31
4.	"Tapping on the Table"	Yves Jongen	Yves Gaillard	3:29
5.	"Spinning Around"	Eric Le Tennen; M. Holm; Xcante	Eduardo Delvino	3:43
6.	"How Many Times"	Ryan; Kings; Bergwall; Jeanette Olsson	Kings; Bergwall	4:00
7.	"Nothing"	Ryan; Jongen	Gaillard	3:23
8.	"Why Imagine"	Ryan; Kings; Bergwall; Greene	Kings; Bergwall	4:37
9.	"Driving Away"	Jongen	Gaillard	3:40
10.	"Love or Lust"	Jongen	Gaillard	3:43
11.	"Wonderland"	Ryan; Kings; Bergwall; Olsson	Kings; Bergwall	3:19
12.	"Stepping Out"	Jongen	Gaillard	3:34
13.	"That Kiss I Miss"	Ryan; Jongen	Gaillard	3:14
14.	"Je t'adore" (French Version)	Ryan; Kings; Bergwall; Greene; Jean-Pierre Sluys	Kings; Bergwall	3:06
15.	"Je donnerais tout" (French Version of "All for You")	Ryan; Cadell; Caruana; Kings; Bergwall; Sluys	Kings; Bergwall	3:09
16.	"Alive" (French Version)	Dobre; Zki; Horn; Sluys	Dirix	3:31
17.	"Combien de fois" (French Version of "How Many Times")	Ryan; Kings; Bergwall; Olsson; Sluys	Kings; Bergwall	4:00
Total length:				60:16

- Polish special edition w/ DVD

All original edition tracks plus music videos

1. "Je t'adore" (music video)
2. "Désenchantée" (music video)
3. "Alive" (English version) (music video)
4. "Mon Cœur résiste encore" (music video)
5. "The Promise You Made" La Promesse (music video)
6. "Libertine" (music video)
7. "Only If I" (music video)
8. "All For You" (music video)
9. "Alive" (French version) (music video)
10. "La Promesse" (music video)
11. "Goodbye" (music video)
12. "Photo Gallery"

== Personnel ==
- Kate Ryan – vocals, backing vocals, lyricist
- Jeanette Olsson – backing vocals, lyricist
- Lisa Greene – backing vocals, lyricist
- B. J. Caruana – backing vocals, lyricist
- Karen Melis – backing vocals
- Niklas Kings – producer, lyricist
- Niclas Bergwall – producer, lyricist
- Yves Jongen a.k.a. Yves Gaillard – producer, lyricist
- Philip Dirix – producer
- Eduardo Delvino – producer
- DJ Zki – lyricist
- Dobre – lyricist
- Victoria Horn – lyricist
- Eric Le Tennen – lyricist
- M. Holm – lyricist
- Xcante – lyricist
- J.P. Sluys – French translations
- Mårten Eriksson – mixing
- Mats Berntoft – guitars
- Martin Bylund – strings
- Mattias Bylund – string arrangement
- Sander van der Heide – mastering
- Johan Hendrickx – A&R

== Charts ==
Weekly chart performance for Alive
Chart (2006)	Peak position
Belgian Albums (Ultratop Flanders)	13
German Albums (Offizielle Top 100)	73
Swiss Albums (Schweizer Hitparade)	73
