= Goodbye (Kate Ryan song) =

Single by Kate Ryan

from the album Stronger
- Released: November 8, 2004
- Length: 3:17
- Label: EMI
- Songwriters: Kate Ryan; Phil Wilde
- Producers: AJ Duncan; Phil Wilde

Kate Ryan singles chronology
"The Promise You Made/La Promesse" (2004)	"Goodbye" (2004)	"Je t'adore" (2006)

Music video
- "Goodbye" on YouTube

Goodbye was the third and final song from Kate Ryan's second studio album Stronger, and her eighth single. This song was released in November 2004. It was the third most successful song from Stronger next to "Only If I" and "The Promise You Made".

== Formats and track listings ==
Belgian CD single

1. "Goodbye" - 3:21
2. "Goodbye" (Instrumental) - 3:21
3. "Goodbye" (Music Video)

German CD single

1. "Goodbye" - 3:21
2. "Goodbye" (Instrumental) - 3:21

== Charts ==
Chart performance for "Alive"
Chart (2004)	Peak position
Austria (Ö3 Austria Top 40)	47
Belgium (Ultratop 50 Flanders)	52
Germany (GfK)	42
Switzerland (Schweizer Hitparade)	93
