= Jeanette Olsson =

Swedish singer and songwriter

Background information
- Origin: Stockholm, Sweden
- Occupation(s): Singer, songwriter
- Labels: Kobalt Label Services

Jeanette Olsson is a Swedish singer and songwriter. She started working as a session singer in Stockholm in the late 1990s. Olsson has provided accompanying and background vocals on tracks by numerous top-selling artists such as Jennifer Lopez, Britney Spears, Nelly Furtado, Celine Dion, Ariana Grande, Steps and many others.

Olsson signed her first publishing deal in 2001 with Kobalt Label Services, with her songs recorded by such artists as Kelly Rowland and Kate Ryan.

Olsson moved from Stockholm to Los Angeles in 2010, continuing to sing backing vocals. She co-wrote and sang the title track for Disneynature movie Wings of Life. She has sung on commercials for Fiat 500, Gillette, Sears and others. Olsson's is one of the voices on the movie scores for Soulsurfer and Rock of Ages, and for the Mickey's Soundsational Parade that premiered in 2011 at Disneyland California. Starting in 2011, she became one of the backing-vocalists on the TV show Glee.

Olsson sang a cover version of "Edelweiss" for the opening credits of the television series The Man in the High Castle.

== Songwriter ==
Olsson has written 150 songs that are published by Good Songs in Denmark.

A selection of songs written/co-written by Olsson

- "Have I Told You", Kelly Rowland
- "How Many Times", Kate Ryan
- "Only If I", Kate Ryan
- "L.I.L.Y." (Like I Love You)", "Your Eyes" (co-writer), "Put my finger on it" (co-writer), "How many times" (co-writer), "Wonderland" (co-writer) by Kate Ryan
- "Higher Ground" (co-writer), Sanne Salomonsen
- "Not alone" (co-writer ), with Charlotte Perrelli
