= The Promise You Made =

1985 single by Cock Robin

Single by Cock Robin

from the album Cock Robin
- B-side: "Have You Any Sympathy?"
- Released: November 1985
- Genre: Soft rock; new wave
- Length: 3:54; 6:36 (extended version)
- Label: Columbia
- Songwriter: Peter Kingsbery
- Producer: Steve Hillage

Cock Robin singles chronology
| "When Your Heart Is Weak" (1985) | "The Promise You Made" (1985) | "Thought You Were On My Side" (1986) |

Music video
- "The Promise You Made" on YouTube

"The Promise You Made" is a song by American pop rock band Cock Robin. Written by Peter Kingsbery, the song appeared on the group's self-titled debut album. It was released as a single first in the US in November 1985, then in early 1986 in Europe, where it became a big hit.

== Chart performance ==
"The Promise You Made" was a notable hit in many European countries, particularly in the Flanders region of Belgium, where it topped the chart for five weeks out off a 11-week chart run, as well as in the Netherlands where it was also number one on the Dutch Top 40 and number two on the Dutch Top 100 Singles. In the latter country, it achieved Platinum status, and ranked in the top ten on the 1986 year-end chart. In France, it spent 12 weeks in the top ten, including three weeks at number four, its highest position, and remained in the top 50 for 24 weeks, thus becoming Cock Robin's best charting single in the country, and was certified Gold disc by the Syndicat National de l'Édition Phonographique.

Other countries with a peak position within the top ten include Germany where it attained number six and appeared on the chart for 18 weeks, Switzerland and Italy, where it reached number seven and four, respectively. It missed the top ten by one place in Ireland where it charted for seven weeks, and was a moderate hit in the UK where it peaked only at number 28 but had a 13-week chart trajectory. On the Music & Media's European Hot 100 Singles chart, it spent six weeks in the top ten with a peak at number six twice, and fell off the chart after 34 weeks of presence. Regularly aired on radios, it spent 27 weeks on the Eurochart Airplay Top 50 with a peak at number eight twice.

== Music video ==
The video opens with an elderly woman stroking her dog; she then encounters some passers-by and Peter Kingsbery enters the recording studio. As Kingsbery starts singing, people loiter around the entrance to the studio and other members of the band also arrive inside and set up the instruments, with Anna LaCazio joining Kingsbery singing. As a fruit stand is knocked over outside, the last band member goes into the studio. In no time all the instruments are in place. Most of the video is made up of fade-outs, alternating the scenes inside the studio showing the band with images of the members of the public outside the studio entrance. The clip ends with pictures of Kingsbery and Anna LaCazio leaving the studio together.

== Track listings ==
All songs written and composed by Peter Kingsbery.

- 7-inch vinyl single

Side one
| No. | Title | Length |
|---|---|---|
| 1. | "The Promise You Made" | 3:52 |

Side two
| No. | Title | Length |
|---|---|---|
| 1. | "Have You Any Sympathy?" | 4:10 |

- 12-inch vinyl single

Side one
| No. | Title | Length |
|---|---|---|
| 1. | "The Promise You Made" (Extended version) | 6:36 |

Side two
| No. | Title | Length |
|---|---|---|
| 1. | "The Promise You Made" | 3:52 |
| 2. | "Have You Any Sympathy?" | 4:10 |

== Charts ==
=== Weekly charts ===
Weekly chart performance for "The Promise You Made"
| Chart (1986) | Peak position |
|---|---|
| Belgium (Ultratop 50 Flanders) | 1 |
| Europe (European Hot 100 Singles) | 6 |
| Europe (European Airplay Top 50) | 8 |
| France (SNEP) | 4 |
| Ireland (IRMA) | 11 |
| Italy (Musica e dischi) | 4 |
| Netherlands (Dutch Top 40) | 2 |
| Netherlands (Single Top 100) | 2 |
| Switzerland (Schweizer Hitparade) | 7 |
| UK Singles (Official Charts) | 28 |
| West Germany (GfK) | 6 |

=== Year-end charts ===
Year-end chart performance for "The Promise You Made"
| Chart (1986) | Position |
|---|---|
| Belgium (Ultratop) | 17 |
| Europe (European Hot 100 Singles) | 11 |
| Netherlands (Dutch Top 40) | 8 |
| Netherlands (Single Top 100) | 10 |
| West Germany (Media Control) | 29 |

== Certifications ==
Certifications and sales for "The Promise You Made"
| Region | Certification | Certified units/sales |
|---|---|---|
| France (SNEP) | Silver | 250,000^{*} |
| Netherlands (NVPI) | Platinum | 100,000^{^} |
^{*} Sales figures based on certification alone.^{^} Shipments figures based on certification alone.

== Kate Ryan cover version ==
"La Promesse" / "The Promise You Made"

Single by Kate Ryan

from the album Stronger
- B-side: "Can You Fix This"
- Released: June 28, 2004
- Genre: Trance
- Length: 3:28
- Label: Antler-Subway, EMI
- Songwriters: Peter Kingsbery; French lyrics by Jo Lemaire
- Producers: Phil Wilde & A. J. Duncan

Kate Ryan singles chronology
| "Only If I" (2004) | "La Promesse" / "The Promise You Made" (2004) | "Goodbye" (2004) |

Licensed audio
- "The promise you made" on YouTube

Music video
- "La Promesse" on YouTube

A cover version of "The Promise You Made", together with a French-language version, "La Promesse", were released as a 2004 single by Belgian singer Kate Ryan. The French lyrics were written by Jo Lemaire. The single was released in the U.S. in 2005, when it reached number 13 on the Billboard Dance Singles Sales chart.

=== Track listings ===
CD single

- Belgium: Antler-Subway, EMI / AS 9108, AS 9111 (Promo)
- Spain: Vale Music / VLDP 288-6 (Promo)

| No. | Title | Length |
|---|---|---|
| 1. | "La Promesse" | 3:28 |
| 2. | "The Promise You Made" | 3:28 |

- Belgium: Antler-Subway, EMI / AS 9112

| No. | Title | Length |
|---|---|---|
| 1. | "La Promesse" (Radio version) | 3:28 |
| 2. | "The Promise You Made" (Radio version) | 3:28 |
| 3. | "La Promesse" (Extended) | 6:00 |
| 4. | "The Promise You Made" (Extended) | 6:00 |
| 5. | "Can You Fix This" | 4:06 |

- Germany: Sushi Tunes / 0010132MIN

| No. | Title | Length |
|---|---|---|
| 1. | "La Promesse" (Radio version) | 3:28 |
| 2. | "The Promise You Made" (Radio version) | 3:28 |
| 3. | "La Promesse" (Alternative Radio Version) | 3:28 |
| 4. | "The Promise You Made" (Alternative Radio Version) | 3:28 |
| 5. | "La Promesse" (Extended version) | 6:00 |
| 6. | "The Promise You Made" (Extended version) | 6:00 |
| 7. | "Can You Fix This" | 4:06 |
| 8. | "La Promesse" (Video) | 3:28 |

- U.S.: Water Music Dance / 302 060 569 2

| No. | Title | Length |
|---|---|---|
| 1. | "The Promise You Made" (Radio Version) | 3:26 |
| 2. | "The Promise You Made" (Bermudez & Harris Pinky Swear Mix - Radio Edit) | 3:32 |
| 3. | "The Promise You Made" (Extended Version) | 5:59 |
| 4. | "The Promise You Made" (Bermudez & Harris Pinky Swear Mix) | 9:25 |
| 5. | "The Promise You Made" (Guitar Mix) | 3:27 |
| 6. | "La Promesse" (Radio Edit) | 3:26 |
| 7. | "La Promesse" (Extended Version) | 5:58 |
| 8. | "The Promise You Made" (Video) | 3:28 |

12-inch vinyl single

- Belgium: EMI / 549498 6
- Germany: Sushi Tunes / Sushitunes015 (Promo)

Side one
| No. | Title | Length |
|---|---|---|
| 1. | "The Promise You Made" (Extended version) | 6:00 |

Side two
| No. | Title | Length |
|---|---|---|
| 1. | "La Promesse" (Extended version) | 6:00 |

=== Charts ===
Chart performance for "The Promise You Made"
| Chart (2004) | Peak position |
|---|---|
| Belgium (Ultratop 50 Flanders) | 8 |
| Belgium (Ultratop 50 Wallonia) | 35 |
| Germany (GfK) | 19 |
| Hungary (Rádiós Top 40) | 16 |
| Poland (Polish Music Charts) | 5 |
| Spain (Promusicae) | 18 |
| US Dance Singles Sales (Billboard) | 13 |

== Other versions ==
In December 1996, Chris Roberts recorded a German-language version with his wife, Claudia Roberts, titled "Ich will nicht, daß wir uns verlier'n", following their marriage. It was released as a single on November 13, 1997. A version was also recorded in the original English language, but was never published. The B-side was "Du kannst nicht immer 17 sein".
