= LoveLife =

"Lovelife"

Single by Kate Ryan

from the album Electroshock
- Released: 11 April 2011 (Belgium)
- Recorded: 2010
- Genre: Dance-pop, Eurodance, Electronica
- Length: 3:42
- Label: ARS/Universal
- Songwriters: Wolfgang Schrödl, Paul Drew, Greig Watts, Pete Barringer, Georgie Dennis
- Producers: Anders Hansson, Felix Persson, Märta Grauers (additional production by Andras Vleminckx & Jérôme "Deekly" Riouffreyt)

Kate Ryan singles chronology
"Évidemment" (2009)	"Lovelife" (2011)	"Broken" (2011)

Music video
- "LoveLife" on YouTube

"LoveLife" is the first single from Kate Ryan's album, Electroshock. It was released worldwide on iTunes on 11 April 2011. The song was written by British writers, Paul Drew, Greig Watts, Pete Barringer (known as DWB) and Georgie Dennis and is based on a riff from "Narcotic" by Liquido.

== Music video ==
A music video to accompany the release of "LoveLife" was first released onto YouTube on 12 April 2011 at a total length of three minutes and twenty-nine seconds.

== Track listing ==
Digital download

1. "Lovelife" (Radio Edit) - 3:42
2. "Lovelife" (Extended Version) - 4:55
3. "Lovelife" (Mike Candys Remix) - 5:28
4. "Lovelife" (Instrumental Radio Edit) - 3:43

== Chart performance ==
Chart (2011)	Peak position
Belgium (Ultratop 50 Flanders)	21
Netherlands (Single Top 100)	72
Slovakia (Rádio Top 100)	71
Spain (PROMUSICAE)	28

== Release history ==
Region	Date	Format	Label
Belgium	11 April 2011	CD single, Digital Download	ARS/Universal
