= Your Eyes (Kate Ryan song) =

Single by Kate Ryan

from the album Free
- B-side: Dans Tes Yeux; Megamix
- Released: May 15, 2009
- Recorded: 2008
- Genre: Dance-pop; Europop
- Length: 3:29
- Label: ARS/Universal
- Songwriters: Niklas Bergwall, Kate Ryan, Niclas Kings, Jeanette Olsson; Jo Lemaire (French lyrics)
- Producer: 2N

Kate Ryan singles chronology
"I Surrender" (2008)	"Your Eyes" (2009)	"Babacar" (2009)

Audio video
- "Your Eyes" on YouTube

"Your Eyes" was the fifth and last single from Kate Ryan's album Free (2008). The single was originally released in the beginning of May 2009 only in the Netherlands by Ryan's Dutch label Spinning Records. After a few weeks the song was released in Russia, in some of the surrounding countries and also some Eastern European countries. This was the second Kate Ryan single to not have a video after "UR (My Love)" (2001) and the first to be not released in her home country Belgium.

== Track list ==
CD Single

1. "Your Eyes" (Radio Mix) - 3:21
2. "Your Eyes" (Album Version) - 3:44
3. "Dans Tes Yeux" (French Version) - 3:44
4. "Megamix" (Containing "Voyage Voyage", "Ella Elle L'a", "I Surrender", "Your Eyes") - 12:37

== Charts ==
Chart (2009)	Peak position
Netherlands Top 100	80
