= Mon cœur résiste encore =

Single by Kate Ryan

from the album Different
- Released: August 31, 2002
- Recorded: 2002
- Genre: Trance
- Length: 3:47
- Label: EMI Belgium
- Songwriters: Kate Ryan, Thierry Bidjeck, Andy Janssens
- Producers: Phil Wilde, AJ Duncan (main version); Niclas Kings, Niclas Bergwall (2N) (2009 remix)

Kate Ryan singles chronology
"Désenchantée" (2002)	"Mon cœur résiste encore" (2002)	"Libertine" (2002)

Audio video
- "Mon cœur résiste encore" on YouTube

"Mon cœur résiste encore" is a song by Belgian artist Kate Ryan. It peaked at number seven on the Belgian Singles Chart in 2002 among many other European Charts. It is the French language version of her first solo hit "Scream for More".

== Versions ==
The song has three versions. The first version was included on the first edition of the album Different. The 2002 version, which was used as the single mix, with some arrangements, but maintaining its trance sound, and it was included on the album's re-issue. And the 2009 version, which is included in Kate Ryan's French-language Greatest hits album French Connection, has a more dance-oriented sound.

== Formats and track listings ==
Belgian CD Single

1. "Mon cœur résiste encore" - 3:47
2. "Mon cœur résiste encore" (Extended Version) - 7:50

== Chart performances ==
In Belgium (Flanders), the single debuted only at #43 on August 31, 2002, but then it made a big jump to #11 and into the top 10, directly to its peak position (#7), in the third week. It stayed for only two weeks in the top 10, but, like the next single Libertine, for 9 weeks in the top 20. After several weeks between #11 and #19, it dropped quickly and fell off the chart (top 50) after 14 weeks, which was average in comparison with the other singles from the album Different.

In Spain, the single had the most success of all, where it jumped directly to its peak position #2 and stayed several weeks in the top 10. In this country, it is the second-most successful single of Kate Ryan, after Ella elle l'a. The positions in other countries were instead a bit disappointing.

=== Weekly charts ===
Chart (2002–2003)	Peak position
Belgium (Ultratop 50 Flanders)	7
Belgium (Ultratop 50 Wallonia)	4
Germany (GfK)	27
Netherlands (Single Top 100)	58
Poland Airplay (ZPAV)	13
Spain (Promusicae)	2
Switzerland (Schweizer Hitparade)	35

=== Year-end charts ===
Chart (2002)	Position
Belgium (Ultratop Flanders)	57
Belgium (Ultratop Wallonia)	47
