= Different (Kate Ryan album) =

Studio album by Kate Ryan
- Released: 21 June 2002
- Length: 60:02
- Label: EMI Belgium
- Producers: AJ Duncan; Phil Wilde

Kate Ryan chronology
| Different (2002) | Stronger (2004) |

Singles from Different
- 1. "Scream for More" Released: 14 April 2001; 2. "UR (My Love)" Released: 20 October 2001; 3. "Désenchantée" Released: 29 March 2002; 4. "Mon Cœur résiste encore" Released: 31 August 2002; 5. "Libertine" Released: 14 December 2002

Different is the debut studio album by Belgian singer Kate Ryan. It was released by EMI on 21 June 2002 in Belgium. The album was produced by AJ Duncan and Phil Wilde. Different peaked at number eight on the Belgian Albums Chart and was certified Gold in Poland and Switzerland.

== Critical reception ==
Professional ratings
Review scores
| Source | Rating |
|---|---|
| AllMusic | 3.5/5 stars |

AllMusic editor John Lucas rated the album three and a half out of five stars. He found that "the music on the album is fairly standard turn of the century Euro dance. The singles are all good, "Mon Coeur Resiste Encore" and the cover of "Désenchantée" are outstanding, but an abundance of filler and samey production renders the album less than essential."

== Track listing ==
All songs produced by Phil Wilde and Andy "AJ Duncan" Janssens.

Different track listing
| No. | Title | Writer(s) | Length |
|---|---|---|---|
| 1. | "Scream for More" | Kate Ryan; Andy Janssens | 4:00 |
| 2. | "Désenchantée" (originally by Mylène Farmer) | Laurent Boutonnat; Mylène Farmer | 3:38 |
| 3. | "UR (My Love)" | Ryan; Janssens | 3:44 |
| 4. | "So in Love" | Ryan; Janssens; Phil Wilde; Shamrock | 4:01 |
| 5. | "Free Your Mind" | Nina Babet; Wilde | 5:07 |
| 6. | "In Your Eyes" | Babet; Janssens; Wilde | 5:59 |
| 7. | "One Happy Day" | Ryan; Janssens | 4:28 |
| 8. | "Lift Me Higher" | Ryan; Wilde | 3:28 |
| 9. | "Through the Eyes" | Ryan; Janssens | 3:43 |
| 10. | "Got to Move On" | Ryan; Wilde | 3:48 |
| 11. | "Head Down" | Ryan | 4:08 |
| 12. | "Magical Love" | Ryan; Janssens | 3:45 |
| 13. | "Mon cœur résiste encore" | Ryan; Janssens; Thierry Bidjeck | 4:01 |
| 14. | "Nos regards qui m'enflamment" | Babet; Janssens; Wilde; Bidjeck | 3:56 |
| 15. | "Ne baisse pas la tête" | Ryan; Marc Gilson | 4:08 |

Reissue track listing
| No. | Title | Writer(s) | Length |
|---|---|---|---|
| 1. | "Désenchantée" (originally by Mylène Farmer) | Laurent Boutonnat; Mylène Farmer | 3:38 |
| 2. | "UR (My Love)" | Kate Ryan; Andy Janssens | 3:47 |
| 3. | "Mon cœur résiste encore" (radio edit) | Ryan; Janssens; Thierry Bidjeck | 3:47 |
| 4. | "Libertine" (originally by Mylène Farmer) | Boutonnat; Jean-Claude Déquéant | 3:13 |
| 5. | "So in Love" | Ryan; Janssens; Phil Wilde; Shamrock | 4:01 |
| 6. | "Free Your Mind" | Nina Babet; Wilde | 5:07 |
| 7. | "Head Down" | Ryan | 4:08 |
| 8. | "Scream for More" (radio edit) | Ryan; Janssens | 3:49 |
| 9. | "In Your Eyes" (radio edit) | Babet; Janssens; Wilde | 3:10 |
| 10. | "One Happy Day" | Ryan; Janssens | 4:28 |
| 11. | "Lift Me Higher" | Ryan; Wilde | 3:28 |
| 12. | "Through the Eyes" | Ryan; Janssens | 3:43 |
| 13. | "Nos regards qui m'enflamment" | Babet; Janssens; Wilde; Bidjeck | 3:56 |
| 14. | "Got to Move On" | Ryan; Wilde | 3:48 |
| 15. | "Ne baisse pas la tête" | Ryan; Marc Gilson | 4:08 |
| 16. | "Magical Love" | Ryan; Janssens | 3:45 |

== Personnel ==
- Kate Ryan – vocals, lyricist
- Andy Janssens a.k.a. "AJ Duncan" – producer, lyricist
- Phil Wilde – producer, lyricist
- Shamrock - lyricist
- Nina Babet - lyricist
- Thierry Bidjeck - French translations ("Mon cœur résiste encore", "Nos Regards Qui M'Enflamment")
- Marc Gilson - French translations ("Ne Baisse pas la Tête")
- Mieke Aerts – backing vocals
- Peter Bulkens – mixing
- Lieve Gerrits – stylist
- Patrick Hamilton – string arrangements
- Philippe Mathys – photography
- Eric Melaerts – guitar
- Paul Van Der Jonckheyd – mastering

== Charts ==
=== Weekly charts ===
Weekly chart performance for Different
| Chart (2002–03) | Peak position |
|---|---|
| Austrian Albums (Ö3 Austria) | 26 |
| Belgian Albums (Ultratop Flanders) | 8 |
| Danish Albums (Hitlisten) | 22 |
| Dutch Albums (Album Top 100) | 88 |
| Finnish Albums (Suomen virallinen lista) | 36 |
| German Albums (Offizielle Top 100) | 23 |
| Portuguese Albums (AFP) | 18 |
| Swedish Albums (Sverigetopplistan) | 17 |
| Swiss Albums (Schweizer Hitparade) | 14 |

=== Year-end charts ===
2002 year-end chart performance for Different
| Chart (2002) | Position |
|---|---|
| Belgian Albums (Ultratop Flanders) | 56 |

2003 year-end chart performance for Different
| Chart (2003) | Position |
|---|---|
| German Albums (Offizielle Top 100) | 62 |
| Swiss Albums (Schweizer Hitparade) | 49 |

== Certifications ==
Certifications for Different
| Region | Certification | Certified units/sales |
|---|---|---|
| Poland (ZPAV) | Gold | 35,000^{*} |
| Switzerland (IFPI Switzerland) | Gold | 20,000^{^} |
^{*} Sales figures based on certification alone.^{^} Shipments figures based on certification alone.
