= UR (My Love) =

Single by Kate Ryan

from the album Different
- Released: October 15, 2001
- Genre: trance
- Length: 3:44
- Label: EMI Belgium
- Songwriters: Kate Ryan, Andy "AJ Duncan" Janssens
- Producers: AJ Duncan, Phil Wilde

Kate Ryan singles chronology
| "Scream for More" (2001) | "UR (My Love)" (2001) | "Désenchantée" (2002) |

Audio video
- "UR (My Love)" on YouTube

"UR (My Love)" (full title: You Are (My Love)) is the second single of the female Belgian dance singer Kate Ryan and was released on October 15, 2001, in Belgium (peaking at #17 after a few weeks), in 2002 in some other countries too, but with less success.

In the U.S., the single was released in 2002 with "Désenchantée" as a double-A-single.

== Formats and track listings ==
CD Single

1. "UR (My Love)" - 3:44
2. "UR (My Love)" (Peter Luts Radio Edit) - 3:34

12" Single

1. "UR (My Love)" (Original Extended) - 8:33
2. "UR (My Love)" (Peter Luts Extended Remix) - 6:57

== Official versions ==
- Original Extended - 8:33
- Peter Luts Radio Edit - 3:34
- Peter Luts Extended Mix - 6:57

== Charts ==
Chart performance for "UR (My Love)"
| Chart (2001) | Peak position |
|---|---|
| Belgium (Ultratop 50 Flanders) | 52 |
| US Hot Dance Singles Sales (Billboard) | 16 |
