= Only If I =

Single by Kate Ryan

from the album Stronger
- B-side: "Hurry Up"
- Released: February 21, 2004
- Recorded: 2003
- Genre: Eurodance
- Length: 3:11
- Label: EMI Belgium
- Songwriters: Jeanette Olsson, Niclas Kings, Niklas Bergwall
- Producers: AJ Duncan, Phil Wilde

Kate Ryan singles chronology
"Libertine" (2002)	"Only If I" (2004)	"The Promise You Made/La promesse" (2004)

Music video
- "Only If I" on YouTube

"Only If I" is the sixth single of the female Belgian dance singer Kate Ryan and was released in 2003 in Belgium. It was taken from her second studio album Stronger. It peaked #16 and was less successful there than the three former singles.

After the international success in 2002 and 2003 with the singles "Désenchantée" (#9 in European Top 200) and "Libertine" (#26) (originally by Mylène Farmer), "Only If I" only peaked #74 in the European Top 200.

== Track listing ==
CD Single

1. "Only If I" (Radio edit) - 3:11
2. "Only If I" (Extended version) - 5:35
3. "Only If I" (Peter Luts remix) - 7:37
4. "Hurry Up" - 3:17

12" Single

1. "Only If I" (Extended version) - 5:35
2. "Only If I" (Peter Luts remix) - 7:37

US Maxi Single

1. "Only If I" (Radio edit) - 3:11
2. "Only If I" (Extended version) - 5:35
3. "Only If I" (Hiver & Hammer Remix Edit) - 3:48
4. "Only If I" (Hiver & Hammer Remix) - 7:23
5. "Only If I" (Alex Megane Remix) - 3:55
6. "Only If I" (Alex Megane Extended) - 6:07
7. "Only If I" (Peter Luts remix) - 7:37

== Chart performances ==
In Belgium (Flanders), the single started at #34, before reaching #16, its peak position. Then it dropped slowly, staying only three weeks in the top 20 and 11 on the whole chart (top 50).

Chart (2004)	Peak position
Austria (Ö3 Austria Top 40)	25
Belgium (Ultratop 50 Flanders)	16
Belgium (Ultratip Bubbling Under Wallonia)	12
Czech Republic (IFPI)	12
Germany (GfK)	27
Hungary (Dance Top 40)	19
Hungary (Editors' Choice Top 40)	39
Poland (Polish Airplay Chart)	12
Spain (Promusicae)	8
Sweden (Sverigetopplistan)	37
Switzerland (Schweizer Hitparade)	34
