= Je t'adore =

2006 single by Kate Ryan

Single by Kate Ryan

from the album Alive
- B-side: "Driving Away"
- Released: February 17, 2006
- Genre: Europop
- Length: 3:03
- Label: EMI Belgium
- Songwriters: Kate Ryan; Niklas Bergwall; Niclas Kings; Lisa Greene
- Producer: 2N

Kate Ryan singles chronology
"Goodbye" (2004)	"Je t'adore" (2006)	"Alive" (2006)

Eurovision Song Contest 2006 entry
- Country: Belgium
- Artist: Kate Ryan
- Language: English
- Composers: Kate Ryan; Niklas Bergwall; Niclas Kings; Lisa Greene
- Lyricists: Kate Ryan; Niklas Bergwall; Niclas Kings; Lisa Greene

Finals performance
- Semi-final result: 12th
- Semi-final points: 69

Entry chronology
- ◄ "Le Grand Soir" (2005)
- "Love Power" (2007) ►

"Je t'adore" (French pronunciation: [ʒə tadɔʁ]; "I adore you") is a song by Belgian singer Kate Ryan. It was the Belgian entry in the Eurovision Song Contest 2006, performed in English (with only the title and the phrase on the chorus in French). It was the seventh song to be performed in this contest and the 999th by counting all songs which had ever performed on Eurovision Song Contest. "Je t'adore" was released in 2006 as the lead single from Ryan's third studio album Alive (2006).

== Composition ==
The song is composed in a key of G♯ minor, and has 131 beats per minute.

== Song information ==
The song was performed in the semi-final, as Belgium had not qualified for the final at the 2005 contest. On the night, it was performed seventh, following Albania's Luiz Ejlli with "Zjarr e ftohtë" and preceding Ireland's Brian Kennedy with "Every Song Is a Cry for Love". At the close of voting, it had received 69 points, with a maximum of 7 points given by Andorra, Malta, and the Netherlands, placing 12th out of 23 and missing the final – thus forcing that Belgium would have to qualify through the semi-final at their next appearance.

The song itself is a love song in a disco style, with Ryan expressing her love and occasionally lapsing into French to sing je t'adore.

The performance was notable on the night for the neon-tubed microphone stands that Ryan variously sang and danced with, each being moved around by the backing dancers. Pre-contest publicity had credited Ryan with a strong song, however this was not borne out in voting. As a small consolation, the presenter charged with announcing the Belgian votes on the night of the final held up a cardboard sign with the words "We Love Kate Ryan" on it – prompting derisive comments from BBC commentator Terry Wogan, who during the contest said the song sounded like "shut that door" instead of je t'adore.

== Formats and track listings ==
Belgian CD Single

1. "Je t'adore" (Eurovision mix) - 3:03
2. "Driving Away" (Radio edit) - 3:42

German CD Single

1. "Je t'adore" (Main version) - 4:08
2. "Je t'adore" (Eurovision ix) - 3:03
3. "Je t'adore" (Extended version) - 5:56
4. "Je t'adore" (J-D alternative mix) - 3:24
5. "Driving Away" (Radio edit) - 3:40
6. "Je t'adore" (Music video)

== Official versions and remixes ==
- "Je T'Adore" (Main version)
- "Je T'Adore" (French version)
- "Je T'Adore" (J-D alternative mix)
- "Je T'Adore" (Eurovision mix)
- "Je T'Adore" (Radio edit)
- "Je T'Adore" (Extended mix)

== Charts ==
Chart performance for "Je t'adore"
Chart (2006)	Peak position
Austria (Ö3 Austria Top 40)	38
Belgium (Ultratop 50 Flanders)	1
Belgium (Ultratop 50 Wallonia)	11
Czech Republic Airplay (ČNS IFPI)	21
Germany (GfK)	26
Greece (IFPI Greece)	16
Netherlands (Single Top 100)	56
Poland (Polish Music Charts)	4
Sweden (Sverigetopplistan)	21
Switzerland (Schweizer Hitparade)	65
