= L.I.L.Y. (Like I Love You) =

Single by Kate Ryan

from the album Free
- Released: 1 February 2008
- Genre: Electropop
- Length: 3:15
- Label: ARS; Universal
- Songwriters: Niklas Bergwall; Jim Dyke; Niclas Kings; Jeanette Olsson
- Producer: 2N

Kate Ryan singles chronology
"Voyage voyage" (2007)	"L.I.L.Y." (2008)	"Ella elle l'a" (2008)

Audio video
- "L.I.L.Y. (Like I Love You)" on YouTube

"L.I.L.Y." (abbreviation for "Like I Love You") is a song by Belgian singer Kate Ryan. It was written by Niklas Bergwall, Jim Dyke, Niclas Kings, and Jeanette Olsson for her fourth studio album Free (2008). Ryan first presented the song during her Alive concert on 6 October 2007 in the Lotto Arena in Antwerp.

== Music video ==
A music video for "L.I.L.Y." was directed by directed by Peter van Eyndt and shot in Berlin in January 2008.

== Track listing ==
CD Single

1. "L.I.L.Y." (Album Version) - 3:15
2. "L.I.L.Y." (Extended Version) - 6:02

== Charts ==
Chart performance for "L.I.L.Y."
Chart (2004)	Peak position
Belgium (Ultratop 50 Flanders)	8
