= B. J. Caruana =

Australian singer and songwriter

B.J. Caruana
- Also known as: Bec Caruana
- Born: Rebecca Jane Caruana; ~1977
- Origin: Australia
- Occupations: Singer, songwriter

B.J. Caruana is an Australian singer and songwriter. Her debut single "Dance All Night" peaked at #51 on the ARIA Singles Chart. The follow-up "Bump" peaked at #83.

Caruana appeared in the 2021 series of The Voice.

== Discography ==
=== Albums ===
List of albums, with release date and label shown
| Title | Details |
|---|---|
| Electric Beach | Released: 2002; Label: Destinova Records (0927496262); Formats: CD |

=== Singles ===
List of singles, with Australian chart positions
| Title | Year | Peak chart positions | Album |
| Title | Year | AUS | Album |
|---|---|---|---|
| "Dance All Night" | 2002 | 51 | Electric Beach |
| "Bump" | 2002 | 83 | Electric Beach |
| "Music in My Life" | 2002 | — | Electric Beach |
| "Just a Feeling" (Johnny Gleeson & Carl Kennedy featuring B.J Caruana) | 2009 | — | |
