= Désenchantée =

1991 single by Mylène Farmer

Single by Mylène Farmer

from the album L'autre...
- Released: 18 March 1991
- Genre: Europop
- Length: 5:22
- Label: Polydor
- Composer: Laurent Boutonnat
- Lyricist: Mylène Farmer
- Producer: Laurent Boutonnat

Mylène Farmer singles chronology
"Plus grandir (live mix)" (1990)	"Désenchantée" (1991)	"Regrets" (1991)

Alternative cover
- 12-inch maxi

"Désenchantée" (pronounced [dezɑ̃ʃɑ̃'te]; feminine of désenchanté, which is French for "Disenchanted" or "Disappointed") is a song recorded by French singer-songwriter Mylène Farmer. The first single from her third studio album L'autre... (1991), it was released on 18 March 1991 by Polydor Records and achieved great success in France, topping the charts for more than two months. It is Farmer's most successful song and is generally considered her signature song. In 2002, the song was covered by Belgian singer Kate Ryan, whose version reached number one in Belgium and became a top-20 hit across Europe.

== Mylène Farmer version ==
=== Background and writing ===
After a two-year absence from the media, Farmer launched this new single "Désenchantée" on 18 March 1991, three weeks before the release of the album L'autre.... At the time, many demonstrations were organized by students throughout France to protest against their status and conditions for learning, and the Gulf War was raging. The pessimistic lyrics of the song strongly echoed the feelings toward worldwide events and thus certainly contributed to its success. According to the sound engineer, Thierry Rogen, "Désenchantée" was recorded four times. Boutonnat originally wanted a jerky song with techno influences, but Rogen convinced him to add drums and a more funk sound. The text was inspired by the 1934 book On the Heights of Despair by the Romanian philosopher Emil Cioran.

Very quickly, the song achieved great success in France, becoming Farmer's biggest hit. As a result, the song was also released in other countries including Canada, UK, Italy, Austria, Switzerland, Belgium, Netherlands, Germany, Australia and Japan. There were many formats for this song.

=== Lyrics and music ===
"Désenchantée" has a melodious tune, and its lyrics have "unexpected hyphenate which dissect the phrases in small sections". This song also has "a very dancing rhythmic color" thanks to the chords played on the piano in the introduction, the bright and chiseled percussion or vocals (performed by Debbie Davis and Carole Fredericks) which bring out the refrain. In the lyrics, the singer expresses her great lucidity on the absurdity of the world and discusses topics related to the existentialism.

=== Music video ===
The music video was produced by Requiem Publishing and Heathcliff SA and directed by Laurent Boutonnat, who also wrote the script. Shot for five days (from 18 to 23 February 1991) in Budapest, Hungary, with a budget of about 240,000 euros, this video was one of the longest at the time (10:12) and used many extras: 119 children and many Hungarian actors such as Erika Francz Jánofné. There is another version shortened to four minutes. The video for the single features a riot in what appears to be a concentration camp where adults and children are subjected to forced labor and being treated abysmally by armed guards. The riot scenes are quite realistically shot and contain much violence. The anthem-like song goes well with the visual background. According to French magazine Instant-Mag, this music video has a fairly similar structure to that of "Tristana". It has a gloomy story, an ambiguous ending, allows various interpretations, and deals with the theme of messianism. Farmer "symbolically embodies the spirit of freedom". The final scene is inspired by the 1830 painting La Liberté guidant le peuple by Eugène Delacroix.

The music video is included on the videos albums L'autre and Music Videos I.

=== Promotion and performances on tours ===
During the shooting of the music video, Farmer also gave a lengthy interview to French television host Laurent Boyer, in Budapest. The interview was later aired on M6, on 7 April 1991. Farmer also performed the song live on Studio 22, broadcast on the radio RTL on 15 May 1991.

In 1991, Farmer appeared on five television shows to promote the songs: Sacrée soirée (17 April, TF1), La Une est à vous (20 April, TF1), Stars 90 (13 May, TF1; Farmer also sang "L'Autre"), Tous à la une (31 May, TF1) and Vela d'Oro at Riva del Garda (Rai Uno, 4 October). On these occasions, Farmer had short hair (as in the music video) and wore white clothes. The performances were accompanied by a choreographed collective dance.

The song was performed on the 1996 tour, the Mylenium Tour, the 2006 tour à Bercy, 2009 tour, the Timeless tour, the Mylène Farmer 2019 residency at the Paris La Défense Arena & the Nevermore Tour.

=== Chart performance ===
"Désenchantée" was the most aired song on radio in 1991 and was also the highest grossing song in 1991, 1992, and 2006, according to the SACEM.

The single debuted on the French Single Chart at number 12 on 13 April 1991, climbing to number one two weeks later, where it stayed for nine consecutive weeks. Then it fell slowly back down the chart, remaining in the top ten for eighteen weeks and in the chart for 25 weeks in total. In the 2010s, the song re-entered the chart many times : on 1 October 2016, it was number four due to downloads, and number 26 on 16 December 2017 when a maxi vinyl was released. It was the best-selling single by a female artist in France and was certified Gold disc by the SNEP.

The song had some success in Belgium where it reached number 18 and in the Netherlands (number three). In the other countries where it was released, "Désenchantée" achieved moderate success. In Switzerland, the single peaked at number 23 on 9 February 1992. In Austria, the single charted for eleven weeks, from 11 August to 20 October 1991, reaching a peak of number 16 on 29 September. In Germany, the song only ranked at number 46.

=== Formats and track listings ===
These are the formats and track listings of single releases of "Désenchantée":

- 7-inch single - France, Germany
- 12-inch maxi - France
- CD single - Japan

No.	Title	Length
1.	"Désenchantée" (single version)	4:45
2.	"Désenchantée" (chaos mix)	4:15

- CD maxi - France, Germany, Australia

No.	Title	Length
1.	"Désenchantée" (single version)	4:45
2.	"Désenchantée" (remix club)	8:10
3.	"Désenchantée" (chaos mix)	6:50

- 12-inch maxi - Germany, Canada

No.	Title	Length
1.	"Désenchantée" (club remix)	8:10
2.	"Désenchantée" (chaos mix)	6:50

=== Official versions ===
Version	Length	Album	Remixed by	Year	Comment
Album version	5:22	L'autre...	—	1991	See the previous sections
Single version	4:45	Plus grandir	—	1991	The musical bridge is shortened.
Chaos mix (short version)	4:10	—	Laurent Boutonnat, Thierry Rogen	1991	This dance version is fast and begins with the sound of thunder.
Chaos mix (extended version)	6:50	—	Laurent Boutonnat, Thierry Rogen	1991	Various sounds are added to the music. Farmer's voice is very mixed at the end of this remix.
Edited version	3:55	—	—	1991	The musical bridge is entirely deleted.
Remix club	8:10	Dance Remixes	Laurent Boutonnat, Thierry Rogen	1991	The song begins with the sounds of children in a playground, and then with a musical introduction in which the words "génération", "désenchantée" and "tout est chaos" are sampled. The music is accelerated and the bridge is extended.
Live version (recorded in 1996)	8:15	Live à Bercy	—	1996	This version is very dynamic. See 1996 tour
Live version (recorded in 2000)	7:12	Mylenium Tour	—	2000	This version has techno sonorities. See Mylenium Tour
Album version	5:00	Les Mots	—	2001	The musical bridge is shortened.
Thunderpuss club anthem	10:04	RemixeS	Thunderpuss	2003	This dance/techno version has a musical introduction which lasts about 2:30.
Live version (recorded in 2006)	6:42	Avant que l'ombre... à Bercy	—	2006	See Avant que l'ombre... à Bercy (tour)
Live version (recorded in 2009)	7:42	N°5 on Tour	—	2009	See Mylène Farmer en tournée
Live version (recorded in 2013)	7:04	Timeless 2013	—	2013	See Timeless
Live version (recorded in 2023)	7:13	Nevermore	—	2024	See Nevermore 2023/2024

=== Credits and personnel ===
- Mylène Farmer – lyrics
- Laurent Boutonnat – music
- Requiem Publishing – editions
- Polydor – recording company
- Marianne Rosenstiehl (Sygma) – photo
- Com'N.B – design

=== Charts ===
==== Weekly charts ====
Chart (1991)	Peak position
Austria (Ö3 Austria Top 40)	16
Belgium (Ultratop 50 Flanders)	18
Belgium (Ultratop 50 Wallonia)	2
Belgian VRT Top 30	23
Europe (Eurochart Hot 100)	7
Europe (European Airplay Top 50)	8
Europe (European Hit Radio)	25
France (SNEP)	1
Germany (GfK)	46
Netherlands (Single Top 100)	19
Netherlands (Dutch Top 40)	18
Quebec (ADISQ)	9
Switzerland (Schweizer Hitparade)	23

Chart (2011)	Peak position
France (SNEP)	44

Chart (2016)	Peak position
France (SNEP)	4

Chart performance for "Désenchantée" (Remix; featuring Feder)
Chart (2024)	Peak position
Turkey (Radiomonitor Türkiye)	5

==== Year-end charts ====
Chart (1991)	Position
Europe (Eurochart Hot 100)	24

=== Certifications ===
Region	Certification	Certified units/sales
France (SNEP)	Gold	400,000
Summaries
Worldwide	—	1,300,000

== Kate Ryan cover version ==
"Désenchantée"

Single by Kate Ryan

from the album Different
- Released: 29 March 2002
- Genre: Dance-pop
- Length: 3:37
- Label: Universal; Antler-Subway
- Composer: Laurent Boutonnat
- Lyricist: Mylène Farmer
- Producers: Phil Wilde; AJ Duncan (main version); Paris Avenue (2009 remix)

Kate Ryan singles chronology
"UR (My Love)" (2001)	"Désenchantée" (2002)	"Mon cœur résiste encore" (2002)

Music video
- "Désenchantée" on YouTube

In 2002, Belgian singer Kate Ryan released her dance-pop style version of "Désenchantée" as the third single from her debut album Different, released in the same year. This version was successful in several European countries.

In 2009, the song was remastered and remixed by Paris Avenue, with dance/electronic style. The remix was included in Ryan's greatest hits album French Connection. In 2020 French hardtrance DJ Trym released a re-work.

=== Track listings ===
CD single

No.	Title	Length
1.	"Désenchantée" (radio edit)	3:38
2.	"Désenchantée" (extended mix)	8:27

CD maxi

No.	Title	Length
1.	"Désenchantée" (radio edit)	3:38
2.	"Désenchantée" (extended mix)	8:27
3.	"Désenchantée" (club version)	8:12

=== Chart performances ===
In the Flanders region of Belgium, the single went directly into the top ten, then reached number one on the third week and stayed there for six weeks. It spent ten weeks in the top three and twenty weeks in the top ten. After 27 weeks on the chart, it fell off the top 50. The single also reached number one in the Belgian dance chart. The single was also very successful in other European countries, such as Austria, Germany, Hungary, Norway and the Netherlands, where it reached the top three of the singles chart and stayed for several weeks in the top ten.

==== Weekly charts ====
Chart (2002–2003)	Peak position
Austria (Ö3 Austria Top 40)	3
Belgium (Ultratop 50 Flanders)	1
Belgium (Ultratop 50 Wallonia)	14
Belgium Dance (Ultratop Flanders)	1
Czech Republic (IFPI)	13
Denmark (Tracklisten)	12
Europe (Eurochart Hot 100)	30
France (SNEP)	12
Germany (GfK)	2
Hungary (Rádiós Top 40)	1
Hungary (Dance Top 40)	40
Hungary (Single Top 40)	3
Netherlands (Dutch Top 40)	2
Netherlands (Single Top 100)	4
Norway (VG-lista)	3
Poland (PiF PaF)	10
Scottish Singles Sales (Official Charts) with "Scream for More"	78
Spain (Promusicae)	7
Sweden (Sverigetopplistan)	4
Switzerland (Schweizer Hitparade)	11
UK Singles (Official Charts) with "Scream for More"	92

==== Year-end charts ====
Chart (2002)	Position
Belgium (Ultratop 50 Flanders)	2
Belgium (Ultratop 50 Wallonia)	48
Europe (Eurochart Hot 100)	91
France (SNEP)	74
French Airplay Chart	100
French TV Music Videos Chart	41
Netherlands (Dutch Top 40)	3
Netherlands (Single Top 100)	14

Chart (2003)	Position
Austria (Ö3 Austria Top 40)	32
Germany (Media Control GfK)	21
Sweden (Hitlistan)	50
Switzerland (Schweizer Hitparade)	84

=== Certifications ===
Region	Certification	Certified units/sales
Belgium (BRMA)	2× Platinum	100,000^{*}
France (SNEP)	Gold	250,000^{*}
Germany (BVMI)	Gold	300,000^{‡}
Sweden (GLF)	Gold	15,000^{^}
^{*} Sales figures based on certification alone.^{^} Shipments figures based on certification alone.^{‡} Sales+streaming figures based on certification alone.

== Other cover versions ==
The song was covered by many other artists, including :

- The lyrics of Electronic's 1992 single "Disappointed" were partly inspired by "Désenchantée".
- In 1996, Lio recorded her own version for the compilation album 1991 - Les Plus Belles Chansons françaises.
- In 1998, the French band Alliage covered the song on Hit Machine, but this version was not released as a single.
- In 1999, the French singer Allan Théo performed the song on stage.
- In 2002, Liloo covered the song which was remixed by Mad' House.
- In 2003, the song was covered by the Swedish artist Christer Björkman.
- In 2005, the song was recorded by Pascal Obispo and Zazie and is available on Les Enfoirés' album 2005 : Le Train des Enfoirés.
- In 2006, Cynthia Brown, Cyril Cinélu, Domy Fidanza and Elfy Ka covered the song in a rock version for an album of the Star Academy.
- In 2008, German Dance Band Siria (An offshoot project of Cascada) Covered the song in a "Handz Up/Euro-Trance Format.
- In 2018, French duo Madame Monsieur covered the song in an electro-pop version
- In 2023, Dutch DJ Oliver Heldens released an official Remix of the Kate Ryan version under Spinnin' Deep, labeled "Oli's 'EuroRave Mix'"
- In 2024, international symphonic metal band Exit Eden covered the song, with Clémentine Delauney leading vocals.
- In 2026, Dutch EDM duo Blasterjaxx covered Kate Ryan's version in a Big Room Techno track called "Désenchantée 3000", which features Kate herself on the title.
