= Libertine (song) =

1986 single by Mylène Farmer

Single by Mylène Farmer

from the album Cendres de lune
- B-side: "Greta"
- Released: 1 April 1986
- Recorded: 1986, France
- Genre: Dance-pop, synthpop
- Length: 3:30
- Label: Polydor
- Songwriters: Lyrics: Laurent Boutonnat; Music: Jean-Claude Déquéant
- Producer: Laurent Boutonnat

Mylène Farmer singles chronology
"Plus grandir" (1985)	"Libertine" (1986)	"Tristana" (1987)

Alternative cover
- First cover

"Libertine" (French pronunciation: [libɛʁtin]) is a 1986 song recorded by French artist Mylène Farmer. It was the third single from her first studio album Cendres de lune and was released on 1 April 1986 and met success on the French chart, becoming Farmer's first big hit. The long form music video, produced as a short film, contains explicitly sexual and violent scenes. In 2002, the song was successfully covered by Belgian singer Kate Ryan, who reached the top 20 in several European countries.

== Background and composition ==
The song was inspired by a rock music song, "L'Amour Tutti Frutti", composed in 1984 by Jean-Claude Déquéant. It had not achieved success at the time, but was appreciated by the duo Farmer/Boutonnat who wanted to record it. Although it is one of the few songs for which she didn't write the lyrics, Farmer can be credited with the origin of the song, because when she was doing a demo take, she repeated "Je suis une catin" ("I am a whore"), which inspired Boutonnat. Two covers were released. The first, in April, shows a dark-haired Farmer wearing an orange robe; and the second, in June, using an image from the videoclip with a red-haired Farmer with a pistol in her hand. The song became a hit, fortunately, because their label, Polydor, could at any time end her contract for two albums if the song had not been successful. In addition, the song led to the success of the album Cendres de Lune.

At the time, various remixes were produced by Boutonnat. An English version of the song, "Bad Girl", was recorded, but unlike "My Mum Is Wrong", it was not completed and released as a single.

"Libertine", one of the few songs not composed by Farmer, contains many explicit references to sexuality. Some phrases are very obscure or seem inconsistent.

== Music video ==
=== Production ===
Produced by Polydor and directed by Boutonnat, the video was shot in five days at the Château de Ferrières and Château de Brou in France, with a budget of what would now be about 46,000 euros (76,000 or 300,000 euros according to other sources). Farmer said at the time that the video had a derisory cost in comparison with the effect it produced. Presented on 18 June 1986 in preview at the cinema of the Champs-Elysées, this music video was notable for its length (10:53).. It is thought to be the first instance of full frontal nudity made by a singer on a major music video. It was inspired by Stanley Kubrick's film Barry Lyndon. Most of the extras were actually employees of Polydor and Movie Box. Sophie Tellier, who plays the Woman in Red, was one of Farmer's dancers and also appeared in other videos. She would also play Farmer's enemy in the video Tristana. Appropriately enough, Rambo Kolawski, the man who raped Farmer's character in the video for "Plus grandir", also appears as the man she kills in the duel.

=== Synopsis ===
The action takes place in mid-18th century France. Libertine (Farmer) is a young woman who dresses in male clothing and spends her time in debauched parties. When the film begins she and a man are about to engage in a duel with pistols, witnessed by a Woman in Red. Libertine kills the man and runs away on a white horse, while the Woman in Red threatens revenge. Later, in a castle, Libertine has a bath with two other women, anatomies on full display. They then dress, Libertine in male attire, and go to a banquet hall filled with people engaged in various pleasures. A man sends Libertine a message and follows her to an upstairs room, rejecting the Woman in Red's advances. The man and Libertine make love. (At this stage Farmer is shown fully naked, including full frontal, and the music stops to give way to sounds evoking eroticism, (moans and howls of wolves). When Libertine returns to the party she is attacked by the Woman in Red. They fight violently and some blood flows. Seriously hurt by a fireplace poker, Libertine and the man manage to escape on horseback, but the Woman in Red stages an ambush with accomplices and they are killed. The two murdered bodies are shown in close-up. The bodies are later found in the video for "Pourvu qu'elles soient douces".

=== Viewings ===
The video was aired on many TV channels, but sometimes in an edited version removing the scenes of violence and sex. The character played by Farmer embodies "the liberal ideas of the [18th century], to the borders of vice and the loss of self", engaging in "extremes practices", such as the "sadomasochistic relationship" with the man. Thanks to this daring video, Farmer gained star status in France. The music channel M6 which, at the time, was showing only music videos, broadcast the uncensored version. At the time, she had explained in an interview that she was bare in this video, but that it was for the first and the last time.

The music video is included on the videos albums Les Clips and Music Videos I.

== Reception ==
"Libertine" was generally well received by contemporary media. France Soir considered this song has "a little music that puts in a good mood from the awakening". The video was much discussed in the media. It was described as a "detonating videoclip", "a real gem directed as a mini-movie", the music video "the most complete and the longest", "more a mini-movie than a videoclip", "the videoclip the strongest of the year".

In France, "Libertine" debuted at number 43 on the singles chart on 30 August 1986. It reached number ten on 25 October. The song managed to remain for twelve weeks in the top 20 and for twenty weeks on the chart. The song was certified Silver disc in 1986 by the SNEP. It was thus the first Farmer's top ten hit, becoming very popular in France over the years and one of her ten best-selling singles. In February 2018, the single was re-edited and re-entered the chart at number one, becoming Farmer's 17th single to top the chart.

== Live performances ==
Farmer performed the song on numerous TV shows between 20 January 1986 and 22 January 1987. With more than 25 appearances in different programmes on various French and Belgian channels (TF1, Antenne 2, FR3, RTBF Belgium, La 5, RTL TV), "Libertine" is to date Farmer's song which was the most promoted on television. At certain performances, she also sang - in playback - "Maman a tort" and "Greta", and was sometimes interviewed.

The song was performed on the 1989, 1996, 2009 and 2023 concert tours. It was also included in a medley during the Mylenium Tour.

== Formats and track listings ==
These are the formats and track listings of single releases of "Libertine":

7" single - First and second covers - France, Canada
7" single - Promo - France

No.	Title	Length
1.	"Libertine"	3:30
2.	"Greta"	4:45

7" maxi - First cover - France

No.	Title	Length
1.	"Libertine"	4:30
2.	"Libertine" (remix)	4:35
3.	"Greta"	4:45

7" maxi - Remix club - France
7" maxi - Remix club - Promo - France

No.	Title	Length
1.	"Libertine" (remix club special)	5:55
2.	"Libertine" (remix)	4:35
3.	"Greta"	4:45

7" maxi - Soundtrack - France

No.	Title	Length
1.	"Duel"	2:20
2.	"Thème"	3:22
3.	"Libertinages"	1:35
4.	"Marche funèbre"	3:14
5.	"Libertine" (instrumental)	3:33

Cassette - Promo - France

No.	Title	Length
1.	"Libertine"	3:30
2.	"Libertine"	3:30

Digital download (since 2005)

No.	Title	Length
1.	"Libertine" (Cendres de lune version)	3:49
2.	"Libertine" (Les Mots version)	3:30
3.	"Libertine" (1989 live version)	12:00
4.	"Libertine" (1996 live version)	5:40
5.	"Libertine" (carnal sins remix)	7:00
6.	"Libertine" (Y-Front remix)	4:02

=== Release history ===
Date	Label	Region	Format	Catalog
April 1986	Polydor	France	7" single	883 829-7
April 1986	Polydor	France	12" maxi	883 829-1
April 1986	Polydor	France	7" single - Promo	883 868-7
April 1986	Polydor	France	12" maxi - Promo	885 077-1
April 1986	Polydor	Canada	7" single	87184
June 1986	Polydor	France	7" single	883 829-7
June 1986	Polydor	France	12" maxi - Remixes	883 829-1
June 1986	Polydor	France	12" maxi - Soundtrack	885 380-1

=== Official versions ===
Version	Length	Album	Remixed by	Year	Comment
Album version	3:49	Cendres de Lune	Laurent Boutonnat	1986	See the previous sections
Single version	3:30	—	—	1986	One refrain is deleted.
Long version	4:30	—	Laurent Boutonnat	1986	The introduction and the musical bridges are extended.
Instrumental	3:31	Les Clips, Music Videos I	—	1986	All the lyrics are deleted, except background vocals in the introduction and during the last minute.
Remix	4:35	—	Laurent Boutonnat	1986	Specially intended to discothèques, the song is fully remixed, but has extended musical introduction and bridges.
New remix	3:35	—	Thierry Rogen	1986	The introduction is played on saxophone. A musical bridge is added.
Soundtrack from the video	3:22	Les Clips, Music Videos I	—	1986	
Remix special club	5:53	Cendres de Lune	Laurent Boutonnat	1986	This remix uses many drum machines.
Live version (recorded in 1989)	12:00	En Concert	—	1989	The song begins with the shot of a pistol. See Mylène Farmer en concert
Carnal sins remix	7:00	Dance Remixes	Laurent Boutonnat	1992	This version adds suggestive sighs and cries of Farmer.
Live version (recorded in 1996)	5:40	Live à Bercy	—	1996	See 1996 Bercy
Live version (recorded in 2000)	0:30	Mylenium Tour	—	2000	The song is included in a medley. See Mylenium Tour
Album version	3:30	Les Mots	Laurent Boutonnat	2001	The song is remastered and uses a different vocal take. It is slightly shortened in comparison with the original version.
Y-Front remix	4:02	RemixeS	Y-Front	2003	This is a techno remix which has many electronic sounds.
Live version (recorded in 2009)	5:35	N°5 on Tour	—	2009	

=== Credits and personnel ===
These are the credits and the personnel as they appear on the back of the single:

- Laurent Boutonnat – lyrics, photo (first cover)
- Jean-Claude Déquéant – music
- Bertrand Le Page and Toutankhamon – editions
- Polydor – recording company
- Éric Caro – photo (second cover)
- Studio Bonne Mine – design

=== Charts and certifications ===
Chart (1986)	Peak position
Europe (European Hot 100 Singles)	34
French SNEP Singles Chart	10
Quebec (ADISQ)	32
Chart (2018)	Peak position
French SNEP Singles Chart	1

Certifications for "Libertine"
Region	Certification	Certified units/sales
France (SNEP)	Silver	250,000^{*}
^{*} Sales figures based on certification alone.

== Cover versions ==
Several artists covered the song including French punk rock and alternative rock group Ludwig von 88 on its album 17 plombs pour péter les tubes, in 1994, Edwige Chandelier, one of the dancers on the 1989 tour, in 1996, for the album Les Plus Belles Chansons françaises - 1986, Les Enfoirés, in 2000 (the song was performed by Liane Foly, Karen Mulder, Axelle Red and Michèle Laroque and their version is available on the album Enfoirés en 2000, released on 28 February 2000), Kate Ryan, in 2003 (see below), and Les Dindes Suprêmes, in 2007. In 2009, French band La Pompe Moderne released its album Greatest Hits with a cover version of "Libertine".

== Kate Ryan version ==
"Libertine"

Single by Kate Ryan

from the album Different
- Released: 14 December 2002
- Recorded: 2001
- Genre: Trance
- Length: 3:13 (main version); 3:04 (2009 mix)
- Label: EMI
- Songwriters: Laurent Boutonnat; Jean-Claude Déquéant
- Producers: Phil Wilde, AJ Duncan (main version); Niclas Kings, Niklas Bergwall (2N) (2009 mix)

Kate Ryan singles chronology
"Mon cœur résiste encore" (2002)	"Libertine" (2002)	"Only If I" (2004)

Music video
- "Libertine" on YouTube

Following the success of her cover version of "Désenchantée", Kate Ryan recorded "Libertine" and released it as single in late 2002. The single also reached the top 20 in several countries, but was less successful than Ryan's previous Farmer cover.

In Belgium (Flanders), the single entered the chart on 14 December 2002 at number 25, then climbed directly to the top 10 and reached a peak at number seven in the following week, then dropped quickly. Staying six weeks in the top ten and for a total of 13 weeks on the chart (top 50), it had an average chart running in comparison with the other singles from the album Different.

In Germany, the single reached the top ten in its first week at number nine, then climbed to number seven, its peak position, a few weeks later. Spending a total of 15 weeks in the top 100, it had the second-best chart run for a single of Kate Ryan in this country. It also reached number seven in Austria and stayed even for 17 weeks on the chart, including seven weeks in the top ten.

=== Formats and track listings ===
CD single

No.	Title	Length
1.	"Libertine" (radio edit)	3:13
2.	"So In Love"	4:01

CD maxi 1

No.	Title	Length
1.	"Libertine" (radio edit)	3:13
2.	"Libertine" (extended)	6:42
3.	"So In Love" (radio edit)	3:48

CD maxi 2

No.	Title	Length
1.	"Libertine" (radio edit)	3:13
2.	"Libertine" (extended)	6:41
3.	"So In Love" (radio edit)	3:49
4.	"So In Love" (extended mix)	6:20

12" maxi

No.	Title	Length
1.	"Libertine" (extended)	6:42
2.	"Libertine" (radio edit)	3:13
3.	"So In Love" (radio edit)	3:48

=== Personnel ===
- Paul van der Jonckheyd – mastering
- Peter Bulkens – mixing
- Philippe Mathys – photo
- AJ Duncan, Phil Wilde – production

=== Charts ===
==== Weekly charts ====
Chart (2002–2003)	Peak position
Austria (Ö3 Austria Top 40)	7
Belgium (Ultratop 50 Flanders)	7
Belgium (Ultratop 50 Wallonia)	34
Denmark (Tracklisten)	15
Finland (Suomen virallinen lista)	20
France (SNEP)	48
Germany (GfK)	7
Hungary (Rádiós Top 40)	5
Norway (VG-lista)	15
Poland (Polish Airplay Chart)	3
Spain (Promusicae)	19
Sweden (Sverigetopplistan)	16
Switzerland (Schweizer Hitparade)	26

==== Year-end charts ====
Chart (2003)	Position
Austria (Ö3 Austria Top 40)	48
Germany (Media Control GfK)	49
