= Jo Lemaire =

Belgian singer and songwriter (born 1956)

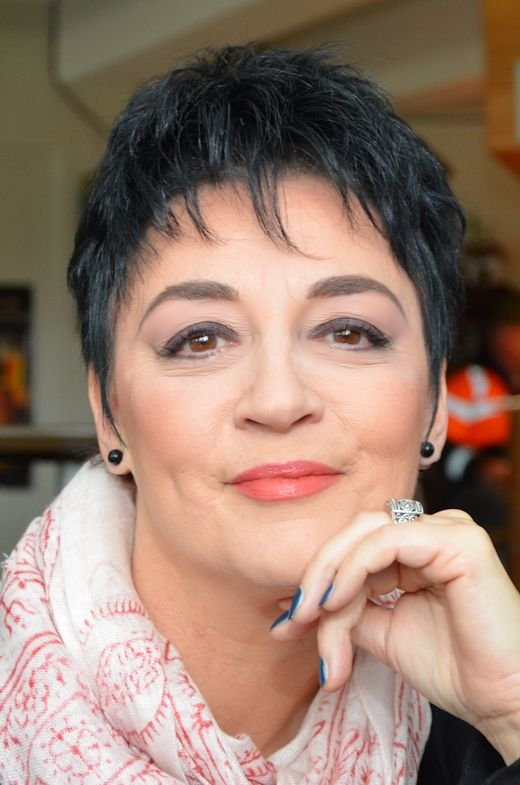
- Lemaire in Bonheiden, Belgium, 2013

Background information
- Born: 5 January 1956 (age 70); Gembloux, Belgium
- Genres: Pop music, New wave music
- Occupations: Singer; songwriter
- Instrument: Vocals
- Years active: 1979–present
- Labels: Vertigo; Mercury; Play That Beat!; WEA; Eufoda; Maestro Music Productions; Universal

Jo Lemaire (born 5 January 1956) is a Belgian singer and songwriter born in Gembloux, Namur. Beyond her native country, she is also popular in France, Switzerland, Canada, and the Netherlands.

== Career ==
Jo Lemaire debuted musically in the late 1970s with her musical group, "Jo Lemaire + Flouze". The group saw true success with the release of their album Pigmy World in 1981. That album, containing a moody synthpop adaptation of Serge Gainsbourg's "Je suis venue te dire que je m'en vais", propelled the singer into stardom all over Europe and Canada. In 1982, the group separated, and Lemaire continued her career as a solo artist. She divorced Philippe Depireux, a fellow former bandmember, and moved to Bilzen with her new partner, Fa Vanham.

Her first solo album, Concorde, was released to great success in 1983. The vinyl was uniquely bilingual, in having one side in English and the other in French. A year later, a self-titled album was released, produced by Jean-Marie Aerts. It also enjoyed success. Her third solo album, Stand Up, was produced by PolyGram International rather than Phonogram Belgium. It was not a hit; her long career has experienced highs and lows.

Through her concerts abroad, her multilingualism and covers of hits by foreign artists, Lemaire has many fans outside Belgium; in Germany, the Netherlands, and in French-speaking countries like Canada, France, and Switzerland. She has participated in the Transmusicales in Rennes, the Printemps de Bourges, the Rock en France, and many other tours and music festivals.

In 1990, she released Duelle, a collection of French songs. It reached Gold disc status in France. Later that year, a Dutch language album was also released, a tribute to fellow Belgian musician Will Tura. In 1994, she collaborated with British singer Carmel in Liverpool to produce an album of the same name.

In 2000, she began touring Flemish schools using music to encourage children to learn French language. Two CDs based on the "Bob & Bobette" comic characters from this campaign were released, titled Eventail Junior. In 2001, she partnered the former Hooverphonic band member Frank Duchêne and lyricists Michael Bisceglia and Ronny Mosuse on the album Flagrants Délices, and its associated single "La saison des amours". In 2007 she recorded a song with Rocco Granata on the album La Vie à Deux.

== Discography ==
=== singles ===
- "So Static!" (with Flouze)
- "Je suis venue te dire que je m'en vais" (with Flouze)

=== Albums ===
- Jo Lemaire + Flouze (1979)
- Precious Time (1980)
- Pigmy World (1981)
- Concorde (1983)
- Jo Lemaire (1984)
- Stand Up (1987)
- Duelle (1990)
- Aujourd'hui (1992)
- Liverpool (1994)
- Jour et Nuit (1997)
- Enkelvoud (1998)
- Une Vie (1999)
- Flagrants Délices (2001)
- Jo Prend La Mer (2003)

=== Compilations ===
- Jo Lemaire Master Serie
- Tranches de vie
