= Kate Ryan =

Belgian singer (born 1980)

- Ryan performing in Ghent, Belgium in 2026

Background information
- Born: Katrien Verbeeck; 22 July 1980 (age 46); Tessenderlo, Belgium
- Genres: Dance-pop; Eurodance; house; trance
- Occupations: Singer; songwriter
- Instruments: Vocals; guitar; piano
- Years active: 2001–present
- Labels: EMI; ARS; Nextar; Spinnin' Records
- Website: kateryan.be

Katrien Verbeeck (born 22 July 1980), known professionally as Kate Ryan, is a Belgian singer and songwriter. She rose to prominence in the early 2000s with dance-pop recordings, several of which were covers of French-language hits, and is best known for her 2002 version of Mylène Farmer's "Désenchantée", which charted across Europe. Ryan represented Belgium at the Eurovision Song Contest 2006 with the song "Je t'adore". She is the recipient of a World Music Award for best-selling Benelux artist, and according to her record label has sold around 3.5 million records over her career.

== Early life ==
Ryan was born in Tessenderlo, in the Belgian province of Limburg. According to AllMusic, she was a multi-instrumentalist by the age of eight and a full-fledged performer by her mid-teens. At 16 she was approached by a manager and joined the pop group Melt, which she left after about two years to pursue a solo career after meeting producer Andy Janssens.

== Career ==
=== 2001–2003: Career beginnings and Different ===
Ryan and Janssens released her debut single, "Scream for More", in 2001; it became a chart success in Belgium, and the follow-up, "UR (My Love)", further established her on the Belgian charts. Her breakthrough came in 2002 with a dance cover of Mylène Farmer's "Désenchantée", which became a hit in several European countries. She signed to the Belgian division of EMI and released her first album, Different, in 2002. The album was certified gold and platinum in a number of territories and sold more than 250,000 copies across Europe. Two further singles from the record, "Mon cœur résiste encore" (a French-language version of "Scream for More") and "Libertine" (a second Farmer cover), also charted. Her recordings were issued in the United States by Robbins Entertainment.

=== 2004–2005: Stronger ===
In 2004, Ryan released her second album, Stronger. Its lead single, "Only If I", met with modest success, while a cover of Cock Robin's "The Promise You Made" (also recorded in French as "La Promesse") performed more strongly. The ballad "Goodbye" followed as a third single. The album and its singles were issued in North America in 2005.

=== 2006: Eurovision Song Contest and Alive ===
In 2006, Ryan won Eurosong '06, the Belgian national selection, and was chosen to represent Belgium at the Eurovision Song Contest 2006 in Athens. Performing "Je t'adore" in the semi-final on 18 May 2006, she finished 12th with 69 points and did not qualify for the final. The song appeared on the album Alive, which also included French-language versions of several tracks and the single "All for You".

=== 2007–2009: Free and French Connection ===
In 2007, Ryan released the double A-side "Voyage, voyage" / "We All Belong"; the former was a cover of Desireless's 1986 hit, and the latter served as the official anthem of the EuroGames in Antwerp. The following year she released "L.I.L.Y. (Like I Love You)" and a cover of France Gall's "Ella, elle l'a", both of which appeared on her 2008 album Free. On 9 November 2008, she received the World Music Award for best-selling Benelux artist at a ceremony in Monaco. A French-language compilation, French Connection, followed in 2009.

=== 2010–2016: Electroshock and later singles ===
Ryan released the single "LoveLife" ahead of her album Electroshock, which appeared on 25 June 2012 and consisted entirely of original English-language material. She subsequently announced a shift toward releasing standalone singles, including "Light in the Dark" and "Heart Flow", the latter serving as the anthem of the World Outgames 2013. Further single releases over the following years included covers of Bronski Beat's "Smalltown Boy" (2015) and Françoise Hardy's "Comment te dire adieu" (2016).

=== 2017–present: Dance collaborations and revival ===
In January 2019, Ryan was the featured vocalist on "Gold", a single by Dutch DJ Sam Feldt released through Spinnin' Records. She returned to solo work later that year with "Wild Eyes", followed in 2020 by "Holiday", a cover of the Madonna song that was used in a Belgian travel advertisement.

In March 2023, Dutch producer Oliver Heldens released a reworking of "Désenchantée" featuring Ryan's vocals, titled "Désenchantée (Oli's EuroRave Mix)", which introduced the track to club and festival audiences. Ryan continued to tour and perform at festivals and 2000s-themed events across Europe, including the Paradise City Festival in 2025. In 2025 she released the single "Casser la voix", and in April 2026 a further reworking of her signature song, "Désenchantée 3000", was released as a collaboration with Blasterjaxx on Maxximize Records.

== Discography ==
Studio albums:

- Different (2002)
- Stronger (2004)
- Alive (2006)
- Free (2008)
- Electroshock (2012)
