= List of UK top-ten singles in 1986 =

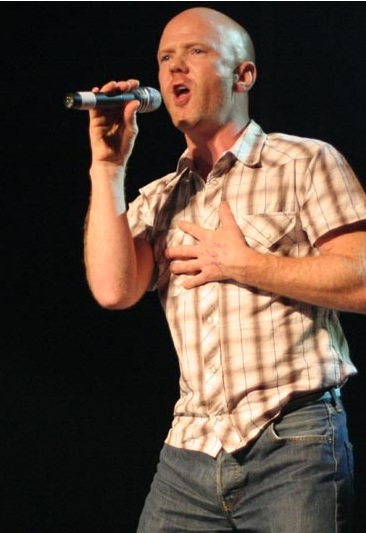
Jimmy Somerville (pictured in 2006) and his group The Communards had the best-selling single of 1986 with their cover of "Don't Leave Me This Way", which spent four weeks at number-one during a nine-week stay in the top 10. Somerville had previously achieved chart success as lead singer with Bronski Beat and would go on to have a successful solo career, but, as of 2021, "Don't Leave Me This Way" remains his only UK number-one single.

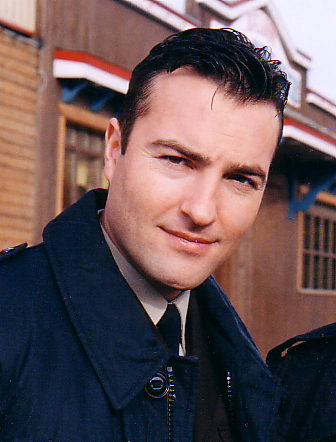
Actor and singer Nick Berry reached number-one in October with "Every Loser Wins", which became the year's second best selling single. During the summer of 1986, the song featured heavily in the BBC soap opera EastEnders in which Berry portrayed Simon "Wicksy" Wicks.

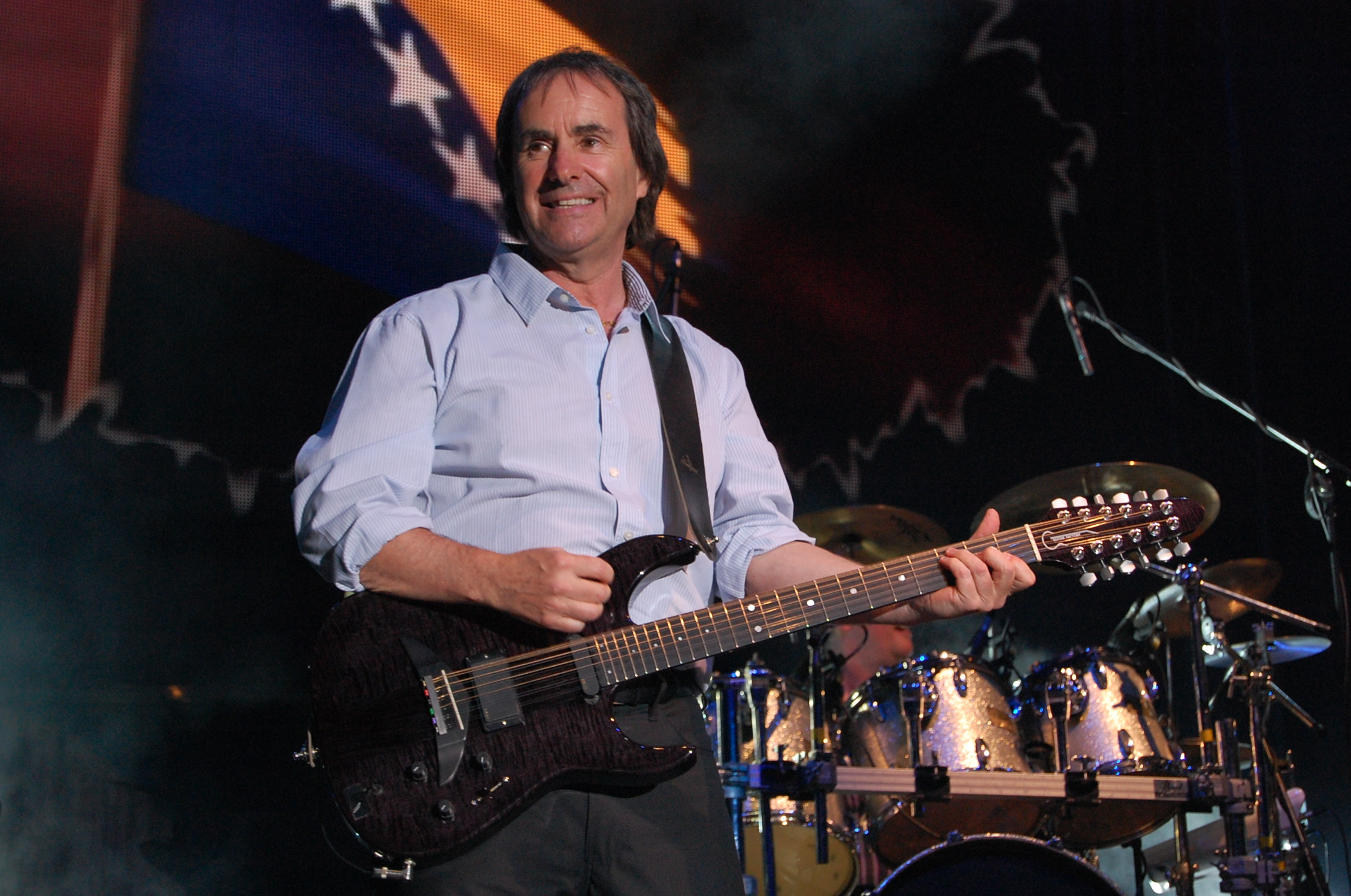
Chris de Burgh scored his biggest hit in 1986 with "The Lady in Red", which spent three weeks at number-one in the UK chart. It went on to become the year's sixth best selling single.

The UK Singles Chart is one of many music charts compiled by the Official Charts Company that calculates the best-selling singles of the week in the United Kingdom. Before 2004, the chart was only based on the sales of physical singles. This list shows singles that peaked in the Top 10 of the UK Singles Chart during 1986, as well as singles which peaked in 1985 and 1987 but were in the top 10 in 1986. The entry date is when the single appeared in the top 10 for the first time (week ending, as published by the Official Charts Company, which is six days after the chart is announced).

One-hundred and forty-six singles were in the top ten in 1986. Ten singles from 1985 remained in the top 10 for several weeks at the beginning of the year, while "Cry Wolf" by A-ha and "Is This Love?" by Alison Moyet were both released in 1986 but did not reach their peak until 1987. "West End Girls by Pet Shop Boys was the only single from 1985 to reach its peak in 1986. Forty-three artists scored multiple entries in the top 10 in 1986. Bon Jovi, Chris de Burgh, Erasure, The Housemartins and Simply Red were among the many artists who achieved their first UK charting top 10 single in 1986.

The 1985 Christmas number-one, "Merry Christmas Everyone" by Shakin' Stevens, remained at number-one for the first week of 1986. The first new number-one single of the year was "West End Girls" by Pet Shop Boys. Overall, twenty different singles peaked at number-one in 1986, with George Michael (3, including two entries with Wham!) having the most singles hit that position.

== Background ==
=== Multiple entries ===
One-hundred and forty-six singles charted in the top 10 in 1986, with one-hundred and thirty-five singles reaching their peak this year.

Forty-three artists scored multiple entries in the top 10 in 1986. Madonna secured the record for most top 10 hits in 1986 with six hit singles.

The Communards were one of a number of artists with two top-ten entries, including the number-one single "Don't Leave Me This Way". The Bangles, Falco, Janet Jackson, Pet Shop Boys and Status Quo were among the other artists who had multiple top 10 entries in 1986.

=== Chart debuts ===
Sixty-two artists achieved their first top 10 single in 1986, either as a lead or featured artist. Of these, six went on to record another hit single that year: The Bangles, The Communards, Falco, The Housemartins, Robert Palmer and Samantha Fox. Five Star had three other entries in their breakthrough year.

The following table (collapsed on desktop site) does not include acts who had previously charted as part of a group and secured their first top 10 solo single.

Artist	Number of top 10s	First entry	Chart position	Other entries
Cherrelle	1	"Saturday Love"	6	—
Alexander O'Neal	1	"Saturday Love"	6	—
Sophia George	1	"Girlie Girlie"	7	—
Mr. Mister	1	"Broken Wings"	4	—
Full Force	1	"Alice, I Want You Just for Me"	9	—
Nana Mouskouri	1	"Only Love"	2	—
Five Star	4	"System Addict"	3	"Can't Wait Another Minute" (7), "Find the Time" (7), "Rain or Shine" (2)
James Brown	1	"Living in America"	5	—
Su Pollard	1	"Starting Together"	2	—
The Damned	1	"Eloise"	3	—
Double	1	"The Captain of Her Heart"	8	—
The Bangles	2	"Manic Monday"	2	"Walk Like an Egyptian" (3)
Sigue Sigue Sputnik	1	"Love Missile F1-11"	3	—
Whistle	1	"(Nothing Serious) Just Buggin'"	7	—
Huey Lewis and the News	1	"The Power of Love"/"Do You Believe in Love"	9	—
The Young Ones	1	"Living Doll"	1	—
Samantha Fox	2	"Touch Me (I Want Your Body)"	3	"Do Ya Do Ya (Wanna Please Me)" (10)
Falco	2	"Rock Me Amadeus"	1	"Vienna Calling" (10)
Atlantic Starr	1	"Secret Lovers"	10	—
Janet Jackson	2	"What Have You Done for Me Lately"	3	"When I Think of You" (10)
Grange Hill Cast	1	"Just Say No"	5	—
Patti LaBelle	1	"On My Own"	2	—
Michael McDonald	1	"On My Own"	2	—
Spitting Image	1	"The Chicken Song"	1	—
Doctor and the Medics	1	"Spirit in the Sky"	1	—
The Matchroom Mob	1	"Snooker Loopy"	6	—
Simply Red	1	"Holding Back the Years"	2	—
Robert Palmer	2	"Addicted to Love"	5	"I Didn't Mean to Turn You On" (9)
Nu Shooz	1	"I Can't Wait"	2	—
Amazulu	1	"Too Good to Be Forgotten"	5	—
The Housemartins	2	"Happy Hour"	3	"Caravan of Love" (1)
Owen Paul	1	"My Favourite Waste of Time"	3	—
Sly Fox	1	"Let's Go All the Way"	3	—
Chris de Burgh	1	"The Lady in Red"	1	—
Stan Ridgway	1	"Camouflage"	4	—
Hollywood Beyond	1	"What's the Colour of Money?"	7	—
Sinitta	1	"So Macho"/"Cruising"	2	—
Boris Gardiner	1	"I Wanna Wake Up with You"	1	—
Anita Dobson	1	"Anyone Can Fall in Love"	4	—
The Simon May Orchestra	1	"Anyone Can Fall in Love"	4	—
Gwen Guthrie	1	"Ain't Nothin' Goin' On but the Rent "	5	—
It Bites	1	"Calling All the Heroes"	6	—
Modern Talking	1	"Brother Louie"	4	—
The Communards	2	"Don't Leave Me This Way"	1	"So Cold the Night" (8)
Jermaine Stewart	1	"We Don't Have to Take Our Clothes Off"	2	—
MC Miker G & DJ Sven	1	"Holiday Rap"	6	—
Cutting Crew	1	"(I Just) Died in Your Arms"	4	—
Cameo	1	"Word Up!"	3	—
Run–D.M.C.	1	"Walk This Way"	8	—
Farley "Jackmaster" Funk	1	"Love Can't Turn Around"	10	—
Darryl Pandy	1	"Love Can't Turn Around"	10	—
Nick Berry	1	"Every Loser Wins"	1	—
Midnight Star	1	"Midas Touch"	8	—
Berlin	1	"Take My Breath Away (Love Theme from Top Gun)"	1	—
Mel and Kim	1	"Showing Out (Get Fresh at the Weekend)"	3	—
Swing Out Sister	1	"Breakout"	4	—
Europe	1	"The Final Countdown"	1	—
Bon Jovi	1	"Livin' on a Prayer"	4	—
Erasure	1	"Sometimes"	2	—
Nick Kamen	1	"Each Time You Break My Heart"	5	—
Oran "Juice" Jones	1	"The Rain"	4	—
Gregory Abbott	1	"Shake You Down"	6	—

Notes

Steve Harley was the frontman of Cockney Rebel, who reached number one in 1975 with "Make Me Smile (Come Up and See Me)" and had three other top 10 singles. His duet with Sarah Brightman was recorded under Harley's own name. Huey Lewis featured on the "We Are the World" charity single in 1985 as part of USA for Africa but his band scored a top 10 hit for the first time in 1986. Nigel Planer from The Young Ones (in character as Neil Pye) reached number two in 1984 with a cover "Hole in My Shoe" by Traffic.

Phil Fearon charted under his own name without his group Galaxy being credited for the first time on his number 8 entry "I Can Prove It". Peter Cetera was a member of Chicago from 1967 to 1985, reaching the top 10 with five singles including number-one "If You Leave Me Now". "Glory of Love" was his solo debut hit. Debbie Harry had her only chart entry independent of Blondie in 1986 – "French Kissin' in the USA" reached number 8 in the chart.

=== Songs from films ===
Original songs from various films entered the top 10 throughout the year. These included "Burning Heart" (from Rocky IV), "Absolute Beginners" (Absolute Beginners), "The Power of Love" (Back to the Future), "A Kind of Magic" (Highlander), "Live to Tell" (original instrumental version in Fire with Fire), "Glory of Love" (The Karate Kid Part II) and "Take My Breath Away" (Top Gun).

=== Charity singles ===
A number of songs recorded for charity reached the top 10 in the charts in 1986. The Comic Relief single was a new version of Cliff Richard's "Living Doll" featuring the cast of the television series The Young Ones, peaking at number one on 29 March 1986.

Tears for Fears re-recorded their 1985 single "Everybody Wants to Rule the World" for Sport Aid. It reached a high of number five on 7 June 1986, three places lower than the peak of the original single.

"Do They Know It's Christmas?" by Band Aid, which re-entered the top 10 at the end of 1985, was also in the chart for the first couple of weeks of 1986.

=== Best-selling singles ===
The Communards had the best-selling single of the year with "Don't Leave Me This Way". The single spent nine weeks in the top 10 (including four weeks at number one), sold over 755,000 copies and was certified gold by the BPI. "Every Loser Wins" by Nick Berry came in second place, selling more than 728,000 copies and losing out by around 27,000 sales. Boris Gardiner's "I Wanna Wake Up with You", "Living Doll" from Cliff Richard & The Young Ones and "Chain Reaction" by Diana Ross made up the top five. Singles by Chris De Burgh, Billy Ocean, Madonna, Berlin and Sinitta were also in the top ten best-selling singles of the year.

== Top-ten singles ==
Key

Symbol	Meaning
‡	Single peaked in 1985 but still in chart in 1986.
♦	Single released in 1986 but peaked in 1987.
(#)	Year-end top-ten single position and rank
Entered	The date that the single first appeared in the chart.
Peak	Highest position that the single reached in the UK Singles Chart.

Entered (week ending)	Weeks in top 10	Single	Artist	Peak	Peak reached (week ending)	Weeks at peak
Singles in 1985
23 November 1985	8	"I'm Your Man" ‡	Wham!	1	30 November 1985	2
30 November 1985	8	"Saving All My Love for You" ‡	Whitney Houston	1	14 December 1985	2
30 November 1985	6	"See the Day" ‡	Dee C. Lee	3	7 December 1985	2
30 November 1985	6	"Separate Lives" ‡	Phil Collins & Marilyn Martin	4	14 December 1985	1
14 December 1985	5	"Dress You Up" ‡	Madonna	5	14 December 1985	1
14 December 1985	4	"Do They Know It's Christmas?" ‡ ^{[A]}	Band Aid	3	21 December 1985	2
14 December 1985	8	"West End Girls"	Pet Shop Boys	1	11 January 1986	2
14 December 1985	5	"Merry Christmas Everyone" ‡	Shakin' Stevens	1	28 December 1985	2
21 December 1985	3	"Last Christmas" ‡ ^{[B]}	Wham!	6	28 December 1985	2
28 December 1985	3	"Walking in the Air" ‡	Aled Jones	5	28 December 1985	2
Singles in 1986
11 January 1986	3	"Hit That Perfect Beat"	Bronski Beat	3	18 January 1986	1
11 January 1986	6	"The Sun Always Shines on T.V."	A-ha	1	25 January 1986	2
11 January 1986	2	"Girlie Girlie"	Sophia George	7	11 January 1986	2
11 January 1986	4	"Saturday Love"	Cherrelle with Alexander O'Neal	6	18 January 1986	2
18 January 1986	4	"Walk of Life"	Dire Straits	2	25 January 1986	1
18 January 1986	2	"You Little Thief"	Feargal Sharkey	5	18 January 1986	2
18 January 1986	3	"Broken Wings"	Mr. Mister	4	25 January 1986	1
18 January 1986	2	"Alice, I Want You Just for Me"	Full Force	9	25 January 1986	1
25 January 1986	4	"Only Love"	Nana Mouskouri	2	1 February 1986	1
25 January 1986	3	"Suspicious Minds"	Fine Young Cannibals	8	1 February 1986	1
1 February 1986	4	"Borderline"	Madonna	2	15 February 1986	1
1 February 1986	7	"When the Going Gets Tough, the Tough Get Going" (#7)	Billy Ocean	1	8 February 1986	4
1 February 1986	5	"System Addict"	Five Star	3	15 February 1986	1
8 February 1986	1	"The Phantom of the Opera"	Sarah Brightman & Steve Harley	7	8 February 1986	1
8 February 1986	3	"Living in America"	James Brown	5	15 February 1986	1
8 February 1986	1	"Sanctify Yourself"	Simple Minds	10	8 February 1986	1
15 February 1986	4	"Eloise"	The Damned	3	22 February 1986	1
15 February 1986	2	"The Captain of Her Heart"	Double	8	15 February 1986	1
15 February 1986	4	"Starting Together"	Su Pollard	2	22 February 1986	1
15 February 1986	4	"How Will I Know"	Whitney Houston	5	22 February 1986	1
22 February 1986	7	"Chain Reaction" (#5)	Diana Ross	1	8 March 1986	3
22 February 1986	4	"Burning Heart"	Survivor	5	1 March 1986	1
1 March 1986	4	"Love Missile F1-11"	Sigue Sigue Sputnik	3	8 March 1986	2
1 March 1986	2	"Don't Waste My Time"	Paul Hardcastle	8	1 March 1986	1
1 March 1986	5	"Manic Monday"	The Bangles	2	15 March 1986	1
8 March 1986	3	"Theme from New York, New York"	Frank Sinatra	4	15 March 1986	1
15 March 1986	3	"Hi Ho Silver"	Jim Diamond	5	22 March 1986	1
15 March 1986	2	"(Nothing Serious) Just Buggin'"	Whistle	7	15 March 1986	1
15 March 1986	4	"Absolute Beginners"	David Bowie	2	22 March 1986	1
15 March 1986	1	"The Power of Love"/"Do You Believe in Love"	Huey Lewis and the News	9	15 March 1986	1
22 March 1986	6	"Living Doll" (#4) ^{[C]}	Cliff Richard & The Young Ones featuring Hank Marvin	1	29 March 1986	3
22 March 1986	2	"Kiss"	Prince	6	22 March 1986	1
22 March 1986	2	"Move Away"	Culture Club	7	22 March 1986	1
29 March 1986	5	"Touch Me (I Want Your Body)"	Samantha Fox	3	5 April 1986	1
29 March 1986	4	"Wonderful World" ^{[D]}	Sam Cooke	2	5 April 1986	1
29 March 1986	4	"You to Me Are Everything (The Decade Remix 76/86)"	The Real Thing	5	5 April 1986	1
5 April 1986	6	"A Different Corner"	George Michael	1	19 April 1986	3
5 April 1986	6	"A Kind of Magic"	Queen	3	26 April 1986	1
5 April 1986	2	"Peter Gunn"	Art of Noise featuring Duane Eddy	8	12 April 1986	1
5 April 1986	8	"Rock Me Amadeus"	Falco	1	10 May 1986	1
12 April 1986	2	"Train of Thought"	A-ha	8	19 April 1986	1
12 April 1986	1	"Secret Lovers"	Atlantic Starr	10	12 April 1986	1
19 April 1986	1	"All the Things She Said"	Simple Minds	9	19 April 1986	1
19 April 1986	3	"Look Away"	Big Country	7	26 April 1986	1
26 April 1986	2	"Just Say No"	Grange Hill Cast	5	26 April 1986	2
26 April 1986	4	"What Have You Done for Me Lately"	Janet Jackson	3	3 May 1986	1
26 April 1986	4	"Can't Wait Another Minute"	Five Star	7	3 May 1986	2
26 April 1986	5	"Live to Tell"	Madonna	2	10 May 1986	1
3 May 1986	6	"Lessons in Love"	Level 42	3	10 May 1986	3
3 May 1986	3	"Greatest Love of All"	Whitney Houston	8	17 May 1986	1
10 May 1986	6	"On My Own"	Patti LaBelle & Michael McDonald	2	17 May 1986	3
10 May 1986	2	"I Heard It Through the Grapevine" ^{[E]}	Marvin Gaye	8	10 May 1986	1
17 May 1986	4	"The Chicken Song"	Spitting Image	1	17 May 1986	3
17 May 1986	6	"Sledgehammer"	Peter Gabriel	4	24 May 1986	4
24 May 1986	7	"Spirit in the Sky"	Doctor and the Medics	1	7 June 1986	3
24 May 1986	2	"Snooker Loopy"	The Matchroom Mob with Chas & Dave	6	24 May 1986	1
24 May 1986	2	"Why Can't This Be Love"	Van Halen	8	24 May 1986	2
24 May 1986	1	"Rollin' Home"	Status Quo	9	24 May 1986	1
31 May 1986	5	"Holding Back the Years"	Simply Red	2	7 June 1986	2
31 May 1986	3	"Set Me Free"	Jaki Graham	7	14 June 1986	1
31 May 1986	5	"Addicted to Love"	Robert Palmer	5	14 June 1986	1
7 June 1986	2	"Everybody Wants to Run the World" ^{[F]}	Tears for Fears	5	7 June 1986	1
7 June 1986	6	"I Can't Wait"	Nu Shooz	2	28 June 1986	1
14 June 1986	2	"Can't Get By Without You (The Second Decade Remix)"	The Real Thing	6	14 June 1986	1
14 June 1986	2	"Vienna Calling"	Falco	10	14 June 1986	2
21 June 1986	5	"The Edge of Heaven"	Wham!	1	28 June 1986	2
21 June 1986	3	"Hunting High and Low"	A-ha	5	21 June 1986	1
21 June 1986	5	"Too Good to Be Forgotten"	Amazulu	5	28 June 1986	2
28 June 1986	5	"Happy Hour"	The Housemartins	3	28 June 1986	2
28 June 1986	5	"My Favourite Waste of Time"	Owen Paul	3	12 July 1986	1
28 June 1986	3	"New Beginning"	Bucks Fizz	8	28 June 1986	2
5 July 1986	7	"Papa Don't Preach" (#8)	Madonna	1	12 July 1986	3
5 July 1986	4	"Venus"	Bananarama	8	12 July 1986	2
12 July 1986	5	"Let's Go All the Way"	Sly Fox	3	19 July 1986	2
12 July 1986	1	"Do Ya Do Ya (Wanna Please Me)"	Samantha Fox	10	12 July 1986	1
19 July 1986	4	"Every Beat of My Heart"	Rod Stewart	2	19 July 1986	1
19 July 1986	3	"Sing Our Own Song"	UB40	5	26 July 1986	1
19 July 1986	8	"The Lady in Red" (#6)	Chris de Burgh	1	2 August 1986	3
26 July 1986	5	"Camouflage"	Stan Ridgway	4	9 August 1986	1
26 July 1986	3	"What's the Colour of Money?"	Hollywood Beyond	7	2 August 1986	1
2 August 1986	7	"So Macho"/"Cruising" (#10)	Sinitta	2	9 August 1986	2
2 August 1986	2	"I Didn't Mean to Turn You On"	Robert Palmer	9	2 August 1986	1
2 August 1986	3	"Find the Time"	Five Star	7	9 August 1986	1
9 August 1986	8	"I Wanna Wake Up with You" (#3)	Boris Gardiner	1	23 August 1986	3
16 August 1986	3	"Anyone Can Fall in Love"	Anita Dobson & The Simon May Orchestra	4	16 August 1986	2
16 August 1986	3	"Ain't Nothin' Goin' On but the Rent"	Gwen Guthrie	5	16 August 1986	2
16 August 1986	2	"Shout (Re-Recording)"	Lulu	8	16 August 1986	1
16 August 1986	2	"Calling All the Heroes"	It Bites	6	23 August 1986	1
23 August 1986	1	"Dancing on the Ceiling"	Lionel Richie	7	23 August 1986	1
23 August 1986	1	"I Can Prove It"	Phil Fearon	8	23 August 1986	1
30 August 1986	3	"Brother Louie"	Modern Talking	4	30 August 1986	2
30 August 1986	9	"Don't Leave Me This Way" (#1)	The Communards	1	13 September 1986	4
30 August 1986	6	"We Don't Have to Take Our Clothes Off"	Jermaine Stewart	2	20 September 1986	2
30 August 1986	6	"Glory of Love"	Peter Cetera	3	20 September 1986	1
30 August 1986	3	"Human"	The Human League	8	6 September 1986	1
6 September 1986	3	"Rage Hard"	Frankie Goes to Hollywood	4	13 September 1986	1
6 September 1986	1	"When I Think of You"	Janet Jackson	10	6 September 1986	1
13 September 1986	2	"Holiday Rap"	MC Miker G & DJ Sven	6	13 September 1986	1
13 September 1986	4	"(I Just) Died in Your Arms"	Cutting Crew	4	20 September 1986	1
20 September 1986	4	"Word Up!"	Cameo	3	27 September 1986	1
20 September 1986	3	"Walk This Way"	Run-D.M.C.	8	27 September 1986	2
20 September 1986	4	"Thorn in My Side"	Eurythmics	5	4 October 1986	1
27 September 1986	5	"Rain or Shine"	Five Star	2	4 October 1986	2
27 September 1986	1	"Love Can't Turn Around"	Farley "Jackmaster" Funk & Jesse Saunders featuring Darryl Pandy	10	27 September 1986	1
4 October 1986	5	"True Blue"	Madonna	1	11 October 1986	1
4 October 1986	5	"You Can Call Me Al"	Paul Simon	4	18 October 1986	1
11 October 1986	6	"Every Loser Wins" (#2)	Nick Berry	1	18 October 1986	3
11 October 1986	2	"I've Been Losing You"	A-ha	8	11 October 1986	1
11 October 1986	6	"In the Army Now"	Status Quo	2	1 November 1986	1
11 October 1986	4	"Suburbia"	Pet Shop Boys	8	18 October 1986	2
18 October 1986	5	"All I Ask of You"	Cliff Richard & Sarah Brightman	3	25 October 1986	2
18 October 1986	6	"Walk Like an Egyptian"	The Bangles	3	15 November 1986	1
25 October 1986	3	"Midas Touch"	Midnight Star	8	1 November 1986	1
1 November 1986	7	"Take My Breath Away" (#9)	Berlin	1	8 November 1986	4
1 November 1986	2	"Don't Get Me Wrong"	The Pretenders	10	1 November 1986	2
8 November 1986	5	"You Keep Me Hangin' On"	Kim Wilde	2	15 November 1986	2
8 November 1986	1	"Notorious"	Duran Duran	7	8 November 1986	1
8 November 1986	5	"Showing Out (Get Fresh at the Weekend)"	Mel and Kim	3	22 November 1986	1
15 November 1986	4	"Breakout"	Swing Out Sister	4	22 November 1986	1
15 November 1986	2	"Through the Barricades"	Spandau Ballet	6	22 November 1986	1
15 November 1986	2	"Don't Give Up"	Peter Gabriel & Kate Bush	9	15 November 1986	2
22 November 1986	8	"The Final Countdown"	Europe	1	6 December 1986	2
22 November 1986	7	"Livin' on a Prayer"	Bon Jovi	4	6 December 1986	1
22 November 1986	2	"For America"	Red Box	10	22 November 1986	2
29 November 1986	8	"Sometimes"	Erasure	2	13 December 1986	1
29 November 1986	3	"Each Time You Break My Heart"	Nick Kamen	5	6 December 1986	1
29 November 1986	2	"French Kissin' in the U.S.A."	Debbie Harry	8	6 December 1986	1
6 December 1986	1	"The Skye Boat Song"	Roger Whittaker & Des O'Connor	10	6 December 1986	1
13 December 1986	6	"Caravan of Love"	The Housemartins	1	20 December 1986	1
13 December 1986	5	"The Rain"	Oran "Juice" Jones	4	13 December 1986	1
13 December 1986	5	"Shake You Down"	Gregory Abbott	6	13 December 1986	1
13 December 1986	5	"Open Your Heart"	Madonna	4	20 December 1986	3
13 December 1986	2	"So Cold the Night"	The Communards	8	20 December 1986	1
20 December 1986	7	"Reet Petite" ^{[G]}	Jackie Wilson	1	27 December 1986	4
20 December 1986	4	"Cry Wolf" ♦	A-ha	5	3 January 1987	2
27 December 1986	7	"Is This Love?" ♦	Alison Moyet	3	10 January 1987	3

== Entries by artist ==
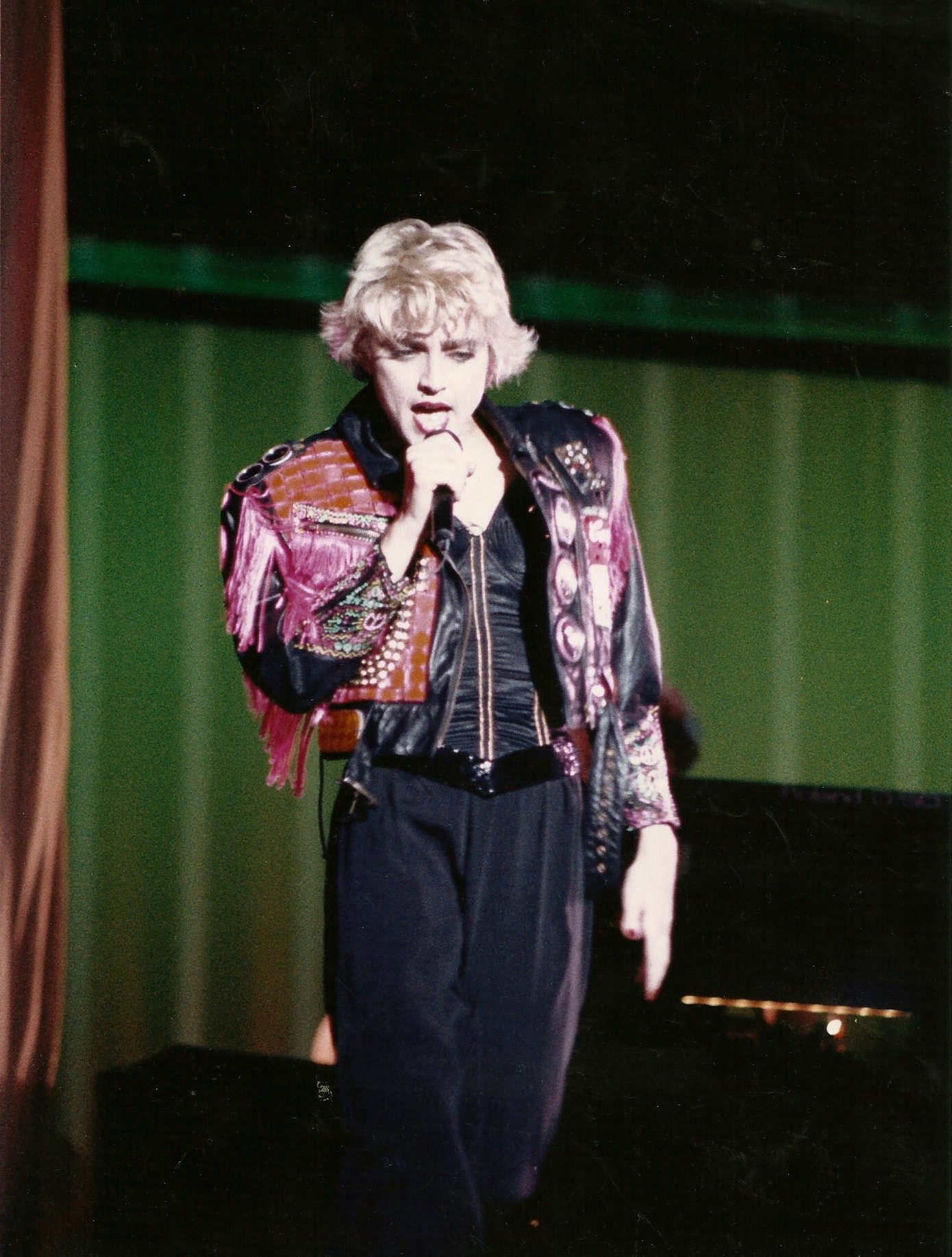
Madonna continued to dominate the UK charts in 1986, achieving a total of six top 10 entries, the most of any artist this year. These included the number-one hits "Papa Don't Preach" and "True Blue".

The satirical television puppet show Spitting Image had one of the year's surprise hits with "The Chicken Song", which spent three weeks at number-one in May.

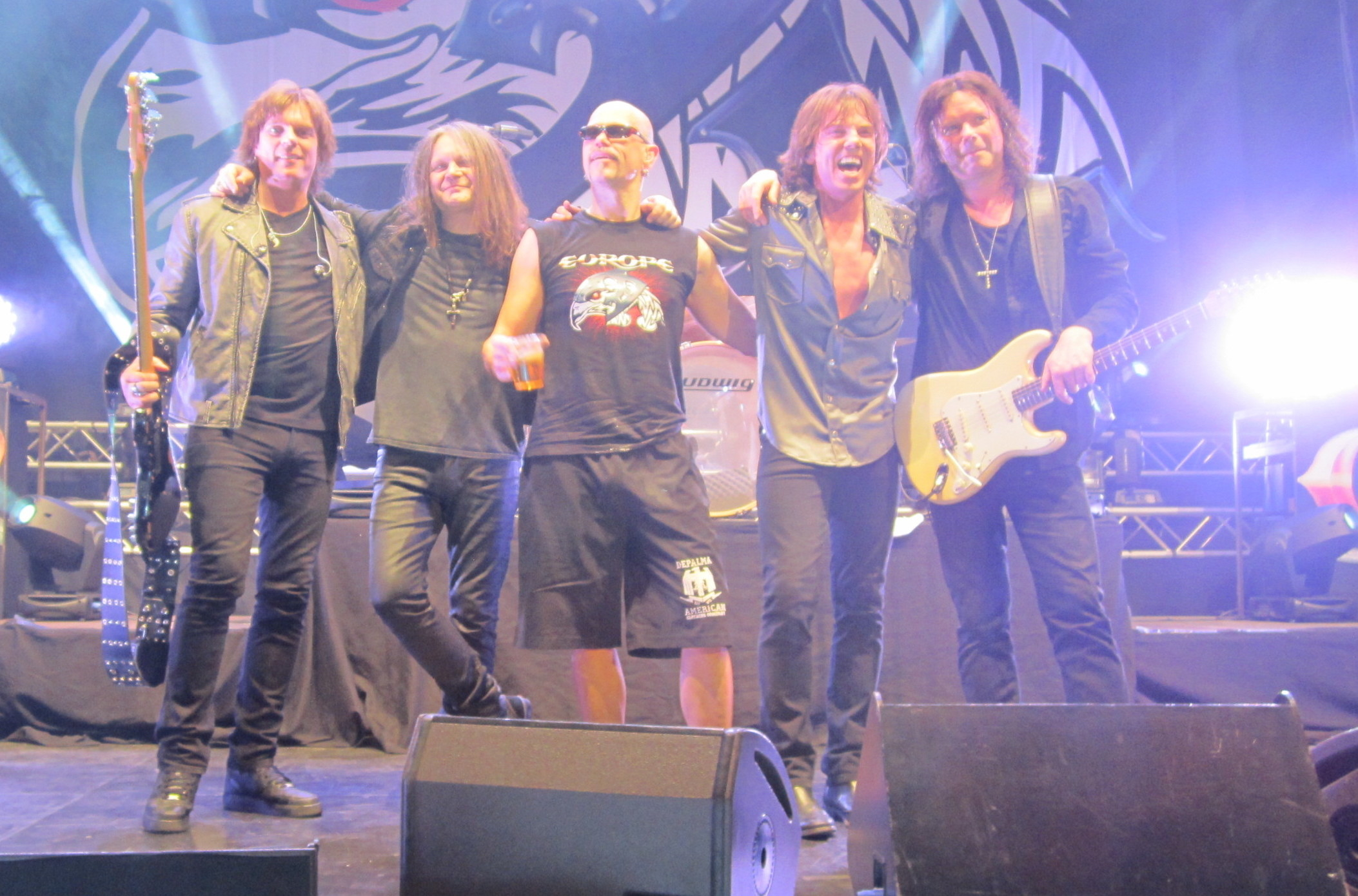
Swedish rock band Europe (pictured in 2014) scored their one and only UK top 10 hit in November 1986 with "The Final Countdown", which spent two weeks at number-one.

The following table shows artists who achieved two or more top 10 entries in 1986, including singles that reached their peak in 1985 or 1987. The figures include both main artists and featured artists, while appearances on ensemble charity records are also counted for each artist. The total number of weeks an artist spent in the top ten in 1986 is also shown.

Entries	Artist	Weeks	Singles
6	Madonna ^{[H]}	26	"Borderline", "Dress You Up", "Live to Tell", "Open Your Heart", "Papa Don't Preach", "True Blue"
5	A-ha ^{[I]}	15	"Cry Wolf", "Hunting High and Low", "I've Been Losing You", "The Sun Always Shines on T.V.", "Train of Thought"
5	George Michael ^{[H]}^{[J]}^{[K]}	15	"A Different Corner", "Do They Know It's Christmas?", "I'm Your Man", "Last Christmas", "The Edge of Heaven"
4	Five Star	17	"Can't Wait Another Minute", "Find the Time", "Rain or Shine", "System Addict"
3	Francis Rossi ^{[H]}^{[J]}^{[L]}	8	"Do They Know It's Christmas?", "In the Army Now", "Rollin' Home"
3	Rick Parfitt ^{[H]}^{[J]}^{[L]}	8	"Do They Know It's Christmas?", "In the Army Now", "Rollin' Home"
3	Wham! ^{[H]}	8	"I'm Your Man", "Last Christmas", "The Edge of Heaven"
3	Whitney Houston ^{[H]}	10	"Greatest Love of All", "How Will I Know", "Saving All My Love for You"
2	Andy Taylor ^{[H]}^{[J]}^{[M]}	2	"Do They Know It's Christmas?", "Notorious"
2	The Bangles	11	"Manic Monday", "Walk Like an Egyptian"
2	Boy George ^{[H]}^{[J]}^{[N]}	3	"Do They Know It's Christmas?", "Move Away"
2	Bruce Watson ^{[H]}^{[J]}^{[O]}	4	"Do They Know It's Christmas?", "Look Away"
2	Cliff Richard	11	"All I Ask of You", "Living Doll"
2	The Communards	11	"Don't Leave Me This Way", "So Cold the Night"
2	David Bowie ^{[H]}^{[J]}	5	"Absolute Beginners", "Do They Know It's Christmas?"
2	Falco	10	"Rock Me Amadeus", "Vienna Calling"
2	Gary Kemp ^{[H]}^{[J]}^{[P]}	3	"Do They Know It's Christmas?", "Through the Barricades"
2	Holly Johnson ^{[H]}^{[J]}^{[Q]}	4	"Do They Know It's Christmas?", "Rage Hard"
2	The Housemartins	8	"Caravan of Love", "Happy Hour"
2	Janet Jackson	5	"What Have You Done for Me Lately", "When I Think of You"
2	John Keeble ^{[H]}^{[J]}^{[P]}	3	"Do They Know It's Christmas?", "Through the Barricades"
2	John Taylor ^{[H]}^{[J]}^{[M]}	2	"Do They Know It's Christmas?", "Notorious"
2	Jon Moss ^{[H]}^{[J]}^{[N]}	3	"Do They Know It's Christmas?", "Move Away"
2	Keren Woodward ^{[H]}^{[J]}^{[R]}	5	"Do They Know It's Christmas?", "Venus"
2	Mark Brzezicki ^{[H]}^{[J]}^{[O]}	4	"Do They Know It's Christmas?", "Look Away"
2	Martin Kemp ^{[H]}^{[J]}^{[P]}	3	"Do They Know It's Christmas?", "Through the Barricades"
2	Nick Rhodes ^{[H]}^{[J]}^{[M]}	2	"Do They Know It's Christmas?", "Notorious"
2	Peter Gabriel	12	"Don't Give Up", "Sledgehammer"
2	Pet Shop Boys ^{[S]}	9	"Suburbia", "West End Girls"
2	Phil Collins ^{[H]}^{[J]}	2	"Do They Know It's Christmas?", "Separate Lives"
2	The Real Thing	6	""Can't Get By Without You (The Second Decade Remix)", "You to Me Are Everything (The Decade Remix 76/86)"
2	Roger Taylor ^{[H]}^{[J]}^{[M]}	2	"Do They Know It's Christmas?", "Notorious"
2	Samantha Fox	6	"Do Ya Do Ya (Wanna Please Me)", "Touch Me (I Want Your Body)"
2	Sarah Brightman	6	"All I Ask of You", "The Phantom of the Opera"
2	Sarah Dallin ^{[H]}^{[J]}^{[R]}	5	"Do They Know It's Christmas?", "Venus"
2	Simon Le Bon ^{[H]}^{[J]}^{[M]}	2	"Do They Know It's Christmas?", "Notorious"
2	Simple Minds	2	"All the Things She Said", "Sanctify Yourself"
2	Siobhan Fahey ^{[H]}^{[J]}^{[R]}	5	"Do They Know It's Christmas?", "Venus"
2	Status Quo	7	"In the Army Now", "Rollin' Home"
2	Steve Norman ^{[H]}^{[J]}^{[P]}	3	"Do They Know It's Christmas?", "Through the Barricades"
2	Stuart Adamson ^{[H]}^{[J]}^{[O]}	4	"Do They Know It's Christmas?", "Look Away"
2	Tony Butler ^{[H]}^{[J]}^{[O]}	4	"Do They Know It's Christmas?", "Look Away"
2	Tony Hadley ^{[H]}^{[J]}^{[P]}	3	"Do They Know It's Christmas?", "Through the Barricades"

== Notes ==
- ^{a} Released as a charity single by Band Aid in 1984 to aid famine relief in Ethiopia. It peaked at number-one for five weeks in 1984, later re-entering the top 10 in December 1985 for four weeks.
- ^{b} "Last Christmas" peaked at number 2 on its initial release in 1984, as part of a double A-side with "Everything She Wants". It was reissued in 1985 (with "Blue" as the B-side) and re-entered the top 10 in December that year for three weeks.
- ^{c} Released as the official single for Comic Relief.
- ^{d} "Wonderful World" originally peaked at number 27 upon its initial release in 1960. It was re-issued in 1986 after being used in a television advertising campaign for Levi's jeans and entered the UK top 10 for the first time.
- ^{e} "I Heard It Through the Grapevine" originally peaked at number-one upon its initial release in 1969. It was re-issued in 1986 after being used in a television advertising campaign for Levi's jeans.
- ^{f} "Everybody Wants to Rule the World", a number 2 hit in 1985, was re-recorded in 1986 under the new title "Everybody Wants to Run the World" and was released as a charity single for Sport Aid to support famine relief in Africa.
- ^{g} "Reet Petite" reached number-one in 1986 after being reissued, 29 years after its initial release and two years after Jackie Wilson's death. It originally peaked at number 6 in 1957. This was the longest gap between a song's release and it rising to the top of the charts until Tony Christie's "Is This the Way to Amarillo?" in 2005.
- ^{h} Figure includes single that peaked in 1985.
- ^{i} Figure includes single that peaked in 1987.
- ^{j} Figure includes an appearance on the "Do They Know It's Christmas?" charity single by Band Aid.
- ^{k} Figure includes three top 10 hits with the group Wham!.
- ^{l} Figure includes two top 10 hits with the group Status Quo.
- ^{m} Figure includes a top 10 hit with the group Duran Duran.
- ^{n} Figure includes a top 10 hit with the group Culture Club.
- ^{o} Figure includes a top 10 hit with the group Big Country.
- ^{p} Figure includes a top 10 hit with the group Spandau Ballet.
- ^{q} Figure includes a top 10 hit with the group Frankie Goes to Hollywood.
- ^{r} Figure includes a top 10 hit with the group Bananarama.
- ^{s} Figure includes single that first charted in 1985 but peaked in 1986.

== See also ==
- 1986 in British music
- List of number-one singles from the 1980s (UK)
