= 1986 in British music =

This is a summary of 1986 in music in the United Kingdom, including the official charts from that year.

== Summary ==
The first number 1 single of 1986 was the breakthrough hit for London synthpop duo the Pet Shop Boys. Their song "West End Girls" had climbed the charts during late 1985 and reached number 1 for two weeks in January. They would have three more top 20 hits this year as well as two top 20 albums, and were still reaching the top 10 in 2006, twenty years later. Another popular synthpop duo this year were Erasure, with their song "Sometimes" reaching number two in the autumn; this success would be followed by many more hits throughout the decade.

After four successful years, the band Wham! split up in the spring. Made up of George Michael and Andrew Ridgeley, they finished with a farewell concert at Wembley Stadium, a greatest hits album The Final which reached number 2, and the single "The Edge of Heaven", their fourth number one, and their last until "Last Christmas" finally reached No. 1 in 2021. George Michael also reached number 1 this year with a solo release, A Different Corner, and went on to have a highly successful solo career.

The formation of the charity Comic Relief provided an unusual song from Cliff Richard, a singer with several huge hits in the 1950s and '60s. He teamed up with the cast of the popular sitcom The Young Ones (itself named after a Richard song) for a new version of his 1959 single "Living Doll", half sung by Richard and half shouted by the Young Ones cast. With proceeds going to the charity, it reached number one for three weeks and was Richard's first number 1 of the decade. Another novelty number one was "The Chicken Song", sung by the cast of satirical puppet show Spitting Image. With lyrics such as "Hold a chicken in the air, stick a deckchair up your nose" it was intended as a parody of novelty holiday songs which were popular at the time, and also topped the chart for three weeks.

American singer Madonna had the biggest-selling album of the year with "True Blue". All singles released from it made the top five, including the number 1s "Papa Don't Preach", "True Blue", and "La Isla Bonita" which topped the chart the year after. The biggest-selling single of the year went to The Communards, with a hi-NRG cover of the disco song "Don't Leave Me This Way". The band included singer Jimmy Somerville who had previously enjoyed success with Bronski Beat, and later started a solo career.

The Christmas number one single was something of a surprise, a re-issue of Jackie Wilson's 1957 single "Reet Petite". Wilson had died in 1984, but the song been re-issued after being used in a television advert for Levi's, with a new video made of a Claymation version of Wilson. Having first been released 29 years earlier, it broke the record for the longest time between a single being released and it hitting number 1, a record that would last until 2005 when Tony Christie's 1971 song "(Is This the Way to) Amarillo" topped the chart.

Birtwistle's opera The Mask of Orpheus, including electronic music realised by Barry Anderson and a libretto by Peter Zinovieff, was staged in London by English National Opera to great critical acclaim. Michael Nyman also came up with a new opera, The Man Who Mistook His Wife for a Hat, a chamber work with a minimalist score. The Orchestra of the Age of Enlightenment was founded in London by a group of period music enthusiasts, going on to become one of the UK's leading orchestras.

== Events ==
- January – The Adrian Boult Hall is opened at Birmingham Conservatoire by the Duchess of Gloucester. The Hall was demolished in June 2016.
- 14 March – Earth Dances for orchestra by Harrison Birtwistle is performed for the first time, at the Royal Festival Hall, London.
- 15 March – "Heartbeat '86", a charity concert for the Birmingham Children's Hospital, is held at the NEC. Performers include Roy Wood, UB40, The Moody Blues, Electric Light Orchestra and Robert Plant. George Harrison makes a surprise appearance playing Johnny B. Goode with everyone at the end of the show.
- 11 April – The Chart Show debuts on Channel 4.
- 10 May – A rare performance of Constant Lambert's 1936 choral work Summer's Last Will and Testament takes place at the Brighton Festival, St Bartholomew's Church, by the BBC Concert Orchestra and Brighton Festival Chorus, with baritone David Wilson-Johnson, conducted by Norman Del Mar.
- 15 May – The Spanish Lady, an opera by Edward Elgar is performed for the first time, in a concert setting, at St John's, Smith Square, London, approximately 53 years after it was composed. A staged performance has to wait until 24 November 1994.
- 21 May – The first performance of Harrison Birtwistle's opera The Mask of Orpheus, takes place at the London Coliseum by the English National Opera, Elgar Howarth and Paul Daniel conducting.
- 7 June – Queen start The Magic Tour, which becomes their final tour with all original members and also their most successful tour.
- 28 June – Wham! perform a final concert at London's Wembley Stadium just before their split. It is attended by 72,000 people.
- 28 July – The first performance of the Concerto for Orchestra, op 93 by Peter Racine Fricker takes place at the Cheltenham Festival, with the Royal Philharmonic Orchestra conducted by Andrew Litton.
- 27 October – Michael Nyman's chamber opera The Man Who Mistook His Wife for a Hat is premiered at the Institute of Contemporary Arts, London.
- 28 October – The first performance of William Wordsworth's Symphony No 8 Pax Hominibus, op 117, the composer's last completed score. It was given by the BBC Scottish Symphony Orchestra under Jerzy Maksymiuk in Stirling.

== Charts ==
=== Number one singles ===
Chart date (week ending)	Song	Artist(s)	Weeks	Sales
4 January	"Merry Christmas Everyone"	Shakin' Stevens	1	89,505
11 January	"West End Girls"	Pet Shop Boys	2	34,697
18 January	"West End Girls"	Pet Shop Boys	2	59,143
25 January	"The Sun Always Shines on TV"	a-ha	2	69,972
1 February	"The Sun Always Shines on TV"	a-ha	2	75,650
8 February	"When The Going Gets Tough, The Tough Get Going"	Billy Ocean	4	56,780
15 February	"When The Going Gets Tough, The Tough Get Going"	Billy Ocean	4	115,923
22 February	"When The Going Gets Tough, The Tough Get Going"	Billy Ocean	4	106,913
1 March	"When The Going Gets Tough, The Tough Get Going"	Billy Ocean	4	80,342
8 March	"Chain Reaction"	Diana Ross	3	87,329
15 March	"Chain Reaction"	Diana Ross	3	114,138
22 March	"Chain Reaction"	Diana Ross	3	76,109
29 March	"Living Doll"	Cliff Richard and The Young Ones	3	148,002
5 April	"Living Doll"	Cliff Richard and The Young Ones	3	175,576
12 April	"Living Doll"	Cliff Richard and The Young Ones	3	98,515
19 April	"A Different Corner"	George Michael	3	83,096
26 April	"A Different Corner"	George Michael	3	79,407
3 May	"A Different Corner"	George Michael	3	55,641
10 May	"Rock Me Amadeus"	Falco	1	44,778
17 May	"The Chicken Song"	Spitting Image	3	73,338
24 May	"The Chicken Song"	Spitting Image	3	91,290
31 May	"The Chicken Song"	Spitting Image	3	59,296
7 June	"Spirit in the Sky"	Doctor and the Medics	3	58,276
14 June	"Spirit in the Sky"	Doctor and the Medics	3	81,923
21 June	"Spirit in the Sky"	Doctor and the Medics	3	54,621
28 June	"The Edge of Heaven"	Wham!	2	61,132
5 July	"The Edge of Heaven"	Wham!	2	66,725
12 July	"Papa Don't Preach"	Madonna	3	80,614
19 July	"Papa Don't Preach"	Madonna	3	89,522
26 July	"Papa Don't Preach"	Madonna	3	82,518
2 August	"The Lady in Red"	Chris de Burgh	3	85,221
9 August	"The Lady in Red"	Chris de Burgh	3	112,166
16 August	"The Lady in Red"	Chris de Burgh	3	95,710
23 August	"I Want to Wake Up with You"	Boris Gardiner	3	109,378
30 August	"I Want to Wake Up with You"	Boris Gardiner	3	126,446
6 September	"I Want to Wake Up with You"	Boris Gardiner	3	89,403
13 September	"Don't Leave Me This Way"	The Communards	4	92,208
20 September	"Don't Leave Me This Way"	The Communards	4	121,125
27 September	"Don't Leave Me This Way"	The Communards	4	107,423
4 October	"Don't Leave Me This Way"	The Communards	4	83,878
11 October	"True Blue"	Madonna	1	102,731
18 October	"Every Loser Wins"	Nick Berry	3	177,055
25 October	"Every Loser Wins"	Nick Berry	3	198,577
1 November	"Every Loser Wins"	Nick Berry	3	107,355
8 November	"Take My Breath Away"	Berlin	4	72,165
15 November	"Take My Breath Away"	Berlin	4	107,627
22 November	"Take My Breath Away"	Berlin	4	84,286
29 November	"Take My Breath Away"	Berlin	4	64,532
6 December	"The Final Countdown"	Europe	2	53,210
13 December	"The Final Countdown"	Europe	2	67,779
20 December	"Caravan of Love"	The Housemartins	1	78,115
27 December	"Reet Petite"	Jackie Wilson	1	129,931

=== Number one albums ===
Chart date (week ending)	Album	Artist(s)	Weeks
4 January	Now 6	Various Artists	2
11 January	Now 6	Various Artists	2
18 January	Brothers in Arms	Dire Straits	10
25 January	Brothers in Arms	Dire Straits	10
1 February	Brothers in Arms	Dire Straits	10
8 February	Brothers in Arms	Dire Straits	10
15 February	Brothers in Arms	Dire Straits	10
22 February	Brothers in Arms	Dire Straits	10
1 March	Brothers in Arms	Dire Straits	10
8 March	Brothers in Arms	Dire Straits	10
15 March	Brothers in Arms	Dire Straits	10
22 March	Brothers in Arms	Dire Straits	10
29 March	Hits 4	Various Artists	4
5 April	Hits 4	Various Artists	4
12 April	Hits 4	Various Artists	4
19 April	Hits 4	Various Artists	4
26 April	Street Life: 20 Great Hits	Bryan Ferry and Roxy Music	5
3 May	Street Life: 20 Great Hits	Bryan Ferry and Roxy Music	5
10 May	Street Life: 20 Great Hits	Bryan Ferry and Roxy Music	5
17 May	Street Life: 20 Great Hits	Bryan Ferry and Roxy Music	5
24 May	Street Life: 20 Great Hits	Bryan Ferry and Roxy Music	5
31 May	So	Peter Gabriel	2
7 June	So	Peter Gabriel	2
14 June	A Kind of Magic	Queen	1
21 June	Invisible Touch	Genesis	3
28 June	Invisible Touch	Genesis	3
5 July	Invisible Touch	Genesis	3
12 July	True Blue	Madonna	6
19 July	True Blue	Madonna	6
26 July	True Blue	Madonna	6
2 August	True Blue	Madonna	6
9 August	True Blue	Madonna	6
16 August	True Blue	Madonna	6
23 August	Now 7	Various Artists	5
30 August	Now 7	Various Artists	5
6 September	Now 7	Various Artists	5
13 September	Now 7	Various Artists	5
20 September	Now 7	Various Artists	5
27 September	Silk & Steel	Five Star	1
4 October	Graceland	Paul Simon	5
11 October	Graceland	Paul Simon	5
18 October	Graceland	Paul Simon	5
25 October	Graceland	Paul Simon	5
1 November	Graceland	Paul Simon	5
8 November	Every Breath You Take: The Singles	The Police	2
15 November	Every Breath You Take: The Singles	The Police	2
22 November	Hits 5	Various Artists	2
29 November	Hits 5	Various Artists	2
6 December	Now 8	Various Artists	4
13 December	Now 8	Various Artists	4
20 December	Now 8	Various Artists	4
27 December	Now 8	Various Artists	4

== Year-end charts ==
=== Best-selling singles ===
Based on sales from 30 December 1985 to 3 January 1987.

No.	Title	Artist	Peak position
1	"Don't Leave Me This Way"	The Communards	1
2	"Every Loser Wins"	Nick Berry	1
3	"I Want to Wake Up with You"	Boris Gardiner	1
4	"Living Doll"	Cliff Richard & The Young Ones	1
5	"Chain Reaction"	Diana Ross	1
6	"The Lady in Red"	Chris de Burgh	1
7	"When the Going Gets Tough, the Tough Get Going"	Billy Ocean	1
8	"Papa Don't Preach"	Madonna	1
9	"Take My Breath Away" (Love Theme from Top Gun)	Berlin	1
10	"So Macho"/"Cruising"	Sinitta	2
11	"True Blue"	Madonna	1
12	"A Different Corner"	George Michael	1
13	"Rock Me Amadeus"	Falco	1
14	"We Don't Have to..."	Jermaine Stewart	2
15	"Spirit in the Sky"	Doctor and the Medics	1
16	"The Final Countdown"	Europe	1
17	"Reet Petite (The Sweetest Girl in Town)"	Jackie Wilson	1
18	"Rain or Shine"	Five Star	2
19	"Caravan of Love"	The Housemartins	1
20	"The Chicken Song"	Spitting Image	1
21	"The Sun Always Shines on T.V."	a-ha	1
22	"On My Own"	Patti LaBelle and Michael McDonald	2
23	"Walk Like an Egyptian"	The Bangles	3
24	"In the Army Now"	Status Quo	2
25	"Lessons in Love"	Level 42	3
26	"Glory of Love"	Peter Cetera	3
27	"The Edge of Heaven"	Wham!	1
28	"Sledgehammer"	Peter Gabriel	4
29	"All I Ask of You"	Cliff Richard & Sarah Brightman	3
30	"Touch Me (I Want Your Body)"	Samantha Fox	3
31	"Wonderful World"	Sam Cooke	2
32	"A Kind of Magic"	Queen	3
33	"Holding Back the Years"	Simply Red	2
34	"You Keep Me Hangin' On"	Kim Wilde	2
35	"Let's Go All the Way"	Sly Fox	3
36	"Word Up!"	Cameo	3
37	"Manic Monday"	The Bangles	2
38	"I Can't Wait"	Nu Shooz	2
39	"My Favourite Waste of Time"	Owen Paul	3
40	"You Can Call Me Al"	Paul Simon	4
41	"Livin' on a Prayer"	Bon Jovi	4
42	"Sometimes"	Erasure	2
43	"Showing Out (Get Fresh at the Weekend)"	Mel & Kim	3
44	"(I Just) Died in Your Arms"	Cutting Crew	4
45	"You to Me Are Everything" (remix)	The Real Thing	5
46	"Happy Hour"	The Housemartins	3
47	"Starting Together"	Su Pollard	2
48	"Thorn in My Side"	Eurythmics	5
49	"Walk of Life"	Dire Straits	2
50	"Borderline"	Madonna	2

=== Best-selling albums ===
Based on sales from 29 December 1985 to 3 January 1987.

No.	Title	Artist	Peak position
1	True Blue	Madonna	1
2	Brothers In Arms	Dire Straits	1
3	Now 8	Various Artists	1
4	Graceland	Paul Simon	1
5	Whitney Houston	Whitney Houston	2
6	Now 7	Various Artists	1
7	Hunting High and Low	a-ha	2
8	A Kind of Magic	Queen	1
9	Silk & Steel	Five Star	1
10	Revenge	Eurythmics	3
11	Hits 5	Various Artists	1
12	Hits 4	Various Artists	1
13	The Final	Wham!	2
14	Invisible Touch	Genesis	1
15	Every Breath You Take: The Singles	The Police	1
16	The Whole Story	Kate Bush	2 (Note: Reached number 1 in 1987)
17	Into the Light	Chris de Burgh	2
18	Street Life: 20 Great Hits	Bryan Ferry and Roxy Music	1
19	So	Peter Gabriel	1
20	Picture Book	Simply Red	2
21	Once Upon a Time	Simple Minds	6 (Note: Reached number 1 in 1985)
22	No Jacket Required	Phil Collins	2 (Note: Reached number 1 in 1985)
23	World Machine	Level 42	3
24	Dancing on the Ceiling	Lionel Richie	2
25	London 0 Hull 4	The Housemartins	3
26	Slippery When Wet	Bon Jovi	6
27	Top Gun Original Soundtrack	Various Artists	3
28	Like a Virgin	Madonna	3 (Note: Reached number 1 in 1985)
29	Fore!	Huey Lewis and the News	8
30	Be Yourself Tonight	Eurythmics	3
31	Scoundrel Days	a-ha	2
32	Communards	The Communards	7
33	Go West/Bangs & Crashes	Go West	8
34	Please	Pet Shop Boys	3
35	Greatest Hits	Queen	17 (Note: Reached number 1 in 1981)
36	Different Light	The Bangles	3
37	Love Zone	Billy Ocean	2
38	Live Magic	Queen	5 (Note: Reached number 3 in 1987)
39	Riptide	Robert Palmer	5
40	Island Life	Grace Jones	4
41	The Dream of the Blue Turtles	Sting	5 (Note: Reached number 3 in 1985)
42	South Pacific	Kiri te Kanawa/José Carreras/Sarah Vaughan/ Mandy Patinkin/London Symphony Orchestra	5
43	The Broadway Album	Barbra Streisand	3
44	Rocky IV Original Soundtrack	Various Artists	3
45	Luxury of Life	Five Star	12
46	Suzanne Vega	Suzanne Vega	11
47	Hounds of Love	Kate Bush	6 (Note: Reached number 1 in 1985)
48	Break Every Rule	Tina Turner	2
49	In the Army Now	Status Quo	7
50	Every Beat of My Heart	Rod Stewart	5

== Classical music: new works ==
- Malcolm Arnold – Symphony No. 9
- Harrison Birtwistle – Earth Dances
- Arthur Butterworth – Symphony No. 4
- Andrew Downes – The Marshes of Glynn
- Alun Hoddinott – Concerto for Orchestra
- Arwel Hughes – Gloria Patri
- Daniel Jones – Cello Concerto

== Opera ==
- Harrison Birtwistle – Yan Tan Tethera
- Michael Nyman – The Man who Mistook his Wife for a Hat

== Musical films ==
- Shanghai Surprise, starring Madonna

== Births ==
- 6 January – Alex Turner, singer and musician (Arctic Monkeys, The Last Shadow Puppets)
- 21 February – Charlotte Church, singer
- 12 March
  - Danny Jones, singer (McFly)
  - Jade McGuire, singer (Pop!)
- 23 April – Laura Mvula, singer
- 7 May – Matt Helders, drummer (Arctic Monkeys)
- 14 July – Dan Smith, singer-songwriter (Bastille)
- 21 July – Rebecca Ferguson, singer-songwriter
- 18 September – Tinchy Stryder, Rapper
- 21 September – Faris Badwan, singer (The Horrors)
- 20 November – Oliver Sykes, singer (Bring Me the Horizon)
- date unknown – Daniel Kidane, composer, Woke (2019 Proms)

== Deaths ==
- 4 January – Phil Lynott, singer and musician (Thin Lizzy), 36 (overdose)
- 8 January
  - Sidney Harrison, pianist and composer, 82
  - Mansel Thomas, composer, 76
- 20 January – Elizabeth Nickell-Lean, operatic mezzo-soprano, 77
- 27 January – Ken Moule, jazz pianist, 60
- 1 February – Dick James, singer and record producer, 65
- 14 February – Edmund Rubbra, composer, 84
- 15 March – Martin Cooper, musicologist, 76
- 3 April – Peter Pears, operatic tenor and partner of Benjamin Britten, 75
- 25 April – Fred Hunt, jazz pianist, 62
- 3 June – Anna Neagle, actress, singer and dancer, 81
- 26 June – William Lovelock, composer, 86
- 29 June – Cliff Townshend, jazz saxophonist, 70
- 29 July – Gordon Mills, musician and songwriter, 51
- 2 September – Philip Radcliffe, composer, 81 (road accident)
- 12 September – Terence MacDonagh, oboist, 78
- 13 October – Eunice Crowther, singer, dancer and choreographer, 70
- 4 November – John Kelsall, conductor and composer, 39
- 6 November – Eddie Thompson, jazz pianist, 61
- 10 November – Mark Lubbock, conductor and composer, 87
- 16 December – Maurice Handford, horn player and conductor, 57
- date unknown
  - Myers Foggin, pianist and conductor, 77
  - Arthur Rosebery, pianist and singer

== Music awards ==
=== BRIT Awards ===
The 1986 BRIT Awards winners were:

- Best British Producer: Dave Stewart
- Best International Solo Artist: Bruce Springsteen
- British Album: Phil Collins – No Jacket Required
- British Female Solo Artist: Annie Lennox
- British Group: Dire Straits
- British Male Solo Artist: Phil Collins
- British Single: Tears for Fears – "Everybody Wants to Rule the World"
- British Video: Paul Young – "Everytime You Go Away"
- Best British Newcomer: Go West
- International Group: Huey Lewis and the News
- Outstanding Contribution: Wham! and Elton John (joint winners)

== See also ==
- 1986 in British radio
- 1986 in British television
- 1986 in the United Kingdom
- List of British films of 1986
