= Hits 5 =

The Hits Album 5

Compilation album by Various Artists
- Released: 10 November 1986
- Label: RCA-Ariola, CBS and WEA

The Hits Albums chronology
Hits 4 (1986)	The Hits Album 5 (1986)	Hits 6 (1987)

The Hits Album 5 or Hits 5 is a compilation album released in November 1986 by RCA-Ariola, CBS and WEA. It was the fifth in the Hits series which would span over 20 years, with the first volume released in December 1984. This was also the first Hits compilation to be released on Compact Disc - a single-CD featuring 16 of the 32 tracks featured on the conventional LP and cassette. It also managed to reach number one on the UK Albums Chart where it remained for two weeks, before being dethroned by its rival Now 8. A video compilation was also released on VHS by CBS/Fox Video.

Hits 5 features one song which reached number one on the UK Singles Chart: "A Different Corner".

== CD track listing ==
1. Paul Simon - "You Can Call Me Al"
2. The Pretenders - "Don't Get Me Wrong"
3. Red Box - "For America"
4. A-ha - "I've Been Losing You"
5. Don Johnson - "Heartbeat"
6. Eurythmics - "Thorn in My Side"
7. Nick Kamen - "Each Time You Break My Heart"
8. Five Star - "Rain or Shine"
9. Lionel Richie - "Love Will Conquer All"
10. George Michael - "A Different Corner"
11. Whitney Houston - "Greatest Love of All"
12. Peter Cetera - "Glory of Love"
13. Rod Stewart - "Every Beat of My Heart"
14. Cyndi Lauper - "True Colors"
15. The Stranglers - "Always the Sun"
16. Paul Young - "Wonderland"

== Vinyl/cassette track listing ==
Record/Tape 1 - Side 1 (1)

1. A-ha - "I've Been Losing You"
2. The Bangles - "Walk Like an Egyptian"
3. Don Johnson - "Heartbeat"
4. Paul Young - "Wonderland"
5. Julian Cope - "World Shut Your Mouth"
6. Bruce Hornsby and The Range - "The Way It Is"
7. Hollywood Beyond - "What's the Colour of Money"
8. Nick Kamen - "Each Time You Break My Heart"

Record/Tape 1 - Side 2 (2)

1. Paul Simon - "You Can Call Me Al"
2. Eurythmics - "Thorn in My Side"
3. The Stranglers - "Always the Sun"
4. The Pretenders - "Don't Get Me Wrong"
5. Five Star - "Rain or Shine"
6. Dead or Alive - "Brand New Lover"
7. Haywoode - "Roses"
8. The Real Thing - "Straight to the Heart"

Record/Tape 2 - Side 1 (3)

1. Cyndi Lauper - "True Colors"
2. Boris Gardiner - "You Are Everything To Me"
3. Rod Stewart - "Every Beat of My Heart"
4. Peter Cetera - "Glory of Love"
5. George Michael - "A Different Corner"
6. Shakin' Stevens - "Because I Love You"
7. Whitney Houston - "Greatest Love of All"
8. Lionel Richie - "Love Will Conquer All"

Record/Tape 2 - Side 2 (4)

1. Red Box - "For America"
2. The Psychedelic Furs - "Heartbreak Beat"
3. Prince - "Anotherloverholenyohead"
4. The The - "Infected"
5. Frankie Goes to Hollywood - "Rage Hard"
6. Meat Loaf and John Parr - "Rock 'n' Roll Mercenaries"
7. Spandau Ballet - "Fight for Ourselves"
8. Robert Palmer - "Addicted to Love"

== Video selection ==
1. The Bangles - "Walk Like an Egyptian"
2. The Pretenders - "Don't Get Me Wrong"
3. Nick Kamen - "Each Time You Break My Heart"
4. Paul Young - "Wonderland"
5. Red Box - "For America"†
6. Shakin' Stevens - "Because I Love You"
7. Howard Jones - "All I Want"††
8. Owen Paul - "My Favourite Waste of Time"††
9. Five Star - "Rain or Shine"†
10. Haywoode - "Roses"†
11. Everything But the Girl - "Come On Home"††
12. Little Richard - "Operator"††
13. Hollywood Beyond - "What's the Colour of Money"†
14. The Stranglers - "Always the Sun"
15. Meat Loaf and John Parr - "Rock 'n' Roll Mercenaries"

† Only available in mono. †† Never appeared on any Hits album.
