= Stedman Pearson =

British pop singer (1964–2025)

- Born: Stedman Pearson Jr. 29 June 1964; Romford, Essex, England
- Origin: Islington, London, England
- Died: 10 March 2025 (aged 60) London, England
- Genres: R&B, dance, pop
- Occupation: Singer
- Years active: 1983–2025
- Formerly of: Five Star

Stedman Pearson (29 June 1964 – 10 March 2025) was a British singer, most notable for being a member of the pop group Five Star with his four siblings.

== Early life and career ==
Pearson was born in Romford, Essex on 29 June 1964. He was the eldest of five siblings, and he studied both dance and fashion at college prior to embarking on a career in music. In 1983, Pearson (then aged 19) joined his teenaged brother and sisters in Five Star, which was created and managed by their father, former musician Buster Pearson. In addition to performing backing vocals, Stedman's interest in dance and fashion would play an integral role in the group and he began designing some of the outfits that would ultimately become the group's trademark matching stage costumes. The glittering costumes coupled with their synchronised dance routines often led to comparisons with The Jackson 5.

The group achieved huge commercial success in the mid-1980s, with their second album Silk & Steel reaching number 1 and selling in excess of 1.2 million copies in the UK alone. By the end of the decade, they had achieved fifteen UK Top 40 hit singles and four Top 20 albums, three of them reached platinum status. Pearson would join his four siblings on stage at the 1987 Brit Awards where they won the category for "Best Group". However, their popularity declined and did not continue into the 1990s, even though the group continued to record.

In 1989, amid reports of bankruptcy, Pearson and his family were forced to move out of their mansion in Berkshire which they had bought in 1987. They moved first to Hatfield and then over to the United States in an attempt to revive their career. However, further commercial success eluded them throughout the 1990s, and by 2001 the group had downsized to a trio, with Stedman, Denise, and Lorraine Pearson being the only remaining members. This version of the group performed on the Here and Now Tour in 2002 along with various other pop acts of the 1980s. Pearson would continue to appear with sister Denise and three backing dancers billed as Five Star up until 2008, making appearances at Butlins Holiday Camps in the UK.

Though not primarily a songwriter within the group, Pearson gained a writing credit for the B-side tracks "Pure Energy" (1986) and "Stone Court" (1987), an instrumental track named after the Berkshire mansion the family had moved into. He also co-wrote the track "Feelings" with sister Doris for the group's 1990 self-titled album.

In October 1990, Pearson pleaded guilty at Kingston Magistrates Court to a charge of public indecency after being arrested in a public toilet in New Malden in London.

== After Five Star ==
After his years of success with Five Star, Pearson diversified with other business interests. For a time, he ran a limousine hire service and also taught dance at a school in London. In September 2006, Pearson utilised his dance skills and appeared as a contestant on the UK Channel 5 programme The All Star Talent Show in which he finished in third place. In 2007, Pearson announced that he was recording his first solo album, although this remains to be released. In 2008, Pearson was one of the contestants on the BBC reality show Celebrity Scissorhands, in which celebrities become hairdressers in aid of Children in Need. In September 2009, after already teaching dance at a school in London, Pearson began working at the Derngate Gym in Northampton, holding a weekly 'jazz dance' class at the facility.

In October 1990, Stedman Pearson appeared in court and pleaded guilty to a charge of public indecency after being arrested in a public toilet in New Malden in London.

In July 2007, it was reported that police had been called to Pearson's home after he claimed to have received death threats from his father and former manager, Buster Pearson.

== Death ==
Pearson died of complications from diabetes on 10 March 2025, at the age of 60.
