= Are You Man Enough =

Are You Man Enough may refer to:

- "Are You Man Enough" (Four Tops song), a 1973 song by the Four Tops and a track from Shaft in Africa
- "Are You Man Enough" (Five Star song), a 1987 song by Five Star from Silk & Steel
- "Are You Man Enough?", a 1987 song by C. C. Catch
- Are You Man Enough?, a 2001 album by Betty Blowtorch
