= The Hits Album 6 =

Compilation album by Various Artists
- Released: 13 July 1987
- Labels: CBS, BMG and WEA

The Hits Albums chronology
Hits 5 (1986)	The Hits Album 6 (1987)	Hits 7 (1987)

The Hits Album 6 is a compilation that was released in July 1987 by CBS, WEA and BMG in the UK. The album was a success, reaching number one in the UK Albums Chart and achieving a platinum BPI award, becoming the UK's fifth best selling album of 1987. It is the second Hits Album to be released on compact disc, with 17 tracks included from the standard 32 track LP and cassette versions. A music video compilation was also released on VHS by CBS/Fox Video.

The Hits Album 6 includes six songs which reached number one in the UK Singles Chart: "I Wanna Dance With Somebody", "I Knew You Were Waiting (For Me)", "Respectable", "Nothing's Gonna Stop Us Now", "La Isla Bonita" and "Star Trekkin'".

== LP/MC track listing ==
Record/Tape 1 Side 1 (1)

1. Whitney Houston - "I Wanna Dance with Somebody (Who Loves Me)" (#1)
2. George Michael and Aretha Franklin - "I Knew You Were Waiting (For Me)" (#1)
3. Terence Trent D'Arby - "If You Let Me Stay"
4. Club Nouveau - "Lean on Me"
5. Five Star - "The Slightest Touch"
6. Donna Allen - "Serious"
7. George Michael - "I Want Your Sex"
8. Mel and Kim - "Respectable" (#1)

Record/Tape 1 Side 2 (2)

1. Starship - "Nothing's Gonna Stop Us Now" (#1)
2. Alison Moyet - "Weak in the Presence of Beauty"
3. Chris Rea - "Let's Dance"
4. Whitesnake - "Is This Love"
5. Fleetwood Mac - "Big Love"
6. Carly Simon - "Coming Around Again"
7. Errol Brown - "Personal Touch"
8. John Farnham - "You're the Voice"

Record/Tape 2 Side 1 (3)

1. Madonna - "La Isla Bonita" (7" Remix) (#1)
2. Bruce Willis - "Under the Boardwalk"
3. Living in a Box - "Living in a Box"
4. Curiosity Killed the Cat - "Ordinary Day"
5. Level 42 - "To Be with You Again"
6. Echo & the Bunnymen - "The Game"
7. The Jesus and Mary Chain - "April Skies"
8. Marillion - "Incommunicado"

Record/Tape 2 Side 2 (4)

1. Labi Siffre - "(Something Inside) So Strong"
2. Elkie Brooks - "No More the Fool"
3. Johnny Logan - "Hold Me Now"
4. Judy Boucher - "Can't Be with You Tonight"
5. Wet Wet Wet - "Wishing I Was Lucky"
6. Johnny Hates Jazz - "Shattered Dreams"
7. Pepsi & Shirlie - "Goodbye Stranger"
8. The Firm - "Star Trekkin'" (#1)

== CD track listing ==
1. Whitney Houston - "I Wanna Dance With Somebody (Who Loves Me)"
2. George Michael and Aretha Franklin - "I Knew You Were Waiting (For Me)"
3. Terence Trent D'Arby - "If You Let Me Stay"
4. Club Nouveau - "Lean on Me"
5. Five Star - "The Slightest Touch"
6. Madonna - "La Isla Bonita" (7" remix)
7. George Michael - "I Want Your Sex"
8. Mel and Kim - "Respectable"
9. Starship - "Nothing's Gonna Stop Us Now"
10. Alison Moyet - "Weak in the Presence of Beauty"
11. Chris Rea - "Let's Dance"
12. Whitesnake - "Is This Love"
13. Fleetwood Mac - "Big Love"
14. Carly Simon - "Coming Around Again"
15. Errol Brown - "Personal Touch"
16. John Farnham - "You're the Voice"
17. Labi Siffre - "(Something Inside) So Strong"

== Video selection ==
1. Terence Trent D'Arby - "If You Let Me Stay"
2. Five Star - "The Slightest Touch"
3. Donna Allen - "Serious"
4. Alison Moyet - "Weak in the Presence of Beauty"
5. Errol Brown - "Personal Touch"
6. Living in a Box - "Living in a Box"
7. Curiosity Killed the Cat - "Ordinary Day"
8. Level 42 - "To Be with You Again"
9. Labi Siffre - "(Something Inside) So Strong"
10. Johnny Logan - "Hold Me Now"
11. Pepsi & Shirlie - "Goodbye Stranger"
12. Wet Wet Wet - "Wishing I Was Lucky"
13. The Jesus and Mary Chain - "April Skies"
14. Echo & the Bunnymen - "Lips Like Sugar" (Never released on a Hits album)
