= If I Say Yes =

Single by Five Star

from the album Silk & Steel
- B-side: "Let Me Down Easy"
- Released: 10 November 1986
- Genre: Pop
- Length: 4:01
- Label: RCA, Tent
- Songwriters: Michael Jay, Marvin Morrow
- Producers: Buster Pearson, Michael Jay

Five Star singles chronology
"Rain or Shine" (1986)	"If I Say Yes" (1986)	"Stay Out of My Life" (1986)

"If I Say Yes" is a 1986 single by British pop group Five Star, and was the follow-up to their biggest-ever UK single, the #2 ranked "Rain or Shine". It was the fourth release from the group's Silk & Steel album. A 3:43 remixed version of the song (an edit of the cassette-only "Lew Hahn New York Remix"), which was the version released in the U.S., appeared on the group's 1989 Greatest Hits album.

== Critical reception ==
Jim Reid of Record Mirror considered "If I Say Yes" a "typically bubbling disco-pop" song very similar to Five Star's previous singles, "with a sax solo, silly clothes and plenty of big grins". In another issue of the same magazine, James Hamilton described the song as a "speedily wrigging and tinkling Jackson 5-ish 120 bpm galloper".

== Track listings ==
- 7" single and Five Star logo shaped picture disc

A. "If I Say Yes"
B. "Let Me Down Easy"

- 12" single PT40982

A. "If I Say Yes" (extended mix) (Phil Harding PWL mix) – 7:05
B1. "Let Me Down Easy"
B2. "Can’t Wait Another Minute" (M&M New York remix) – 8:36

- 2nd 12" single PT40982R

A1. "If I Say Yes" (urban remix) (Shep Pettibone mix) – 5:45
A2. "If I Say Yes" (dub mix) (Shep Pettibone mix) – 6:05
B1. "Let Me Down Easy"
B2. "Can't Wait Another Minute" (M&M New York remix) – 8:36

All tracks available on the remastered versions of either the 2010 'Silk & Steel' album, the 2013 'The Remix Anthology (The Remixes 1984-1991)' or the 2018 'Luxury - The Definitive Anthology 1984-1991' boxset.

== Charts ==
=== Weekly charts ===
Weekly chart performance for "If I Say Yes"
Chart (1986–1987)	Peak position
Belgium (Ultratop 50 Flanders)	29
Europe (Eurochart Hot 100)	50
Europe (European Airplay Top 50)	35
Ireland (IRMA)	9
UK Singles Chart	15
UK Dance (Music Week)	4
US Billboard Hot 100	67
US Billboard Hot Dance-Club Play	26
US Billboard Hot Black Singles	13

=== Year-end charts ===
1986 year-end chart performance for "If I Say Yes"
Chart (1986)	Position
UK Dance (Music Week)	65
