= Stay Out of My Life =

1987 single by Five Star

Single by Five Star

from the album Silk & Steel
- B-side: "How Dare You (Stay Out of My Life)"
- Released: 26 January 1987
- Genre: Pop
- Length: 3:55
- Label: RCA, Tent
- Songwriter: Denise Pearson
- Producers: Buster Pearson, Denise Pearson

Five Star singles chronology
"If I Say Yes" (1986)	"Stay Out of My Life" (1987)	"The Slightest Touch" (1987)

"Stay Out Of My Life" is a song by British pop music group Five Star. It was released as the fifth single from their second album, Silk & Steel, and reached number nine on the UK singles chart. The song's B-side, "How Dare You (Stay Out of My Life)", was used as the theme tune to the 1980s children's television series made by Tyne Tees TV called How Dare You, presented by Carrie Grant.

== Track listings ==
7-inch single

A. "Stay Out of My Life"
B. "(How Dare You) Stay Out of My Life"

12-inch single

1. "Stay Out of My Life" (extended version)
2. "If I Say Yes" (Lew Hahn U.S. dub remix)
3. "(How Dare You) Stay Out of My Life"

== Charts ==
Chart (1987)	Peak position
Europe (European Hot 100 Singles)	48
Ireland (IRMA)	5
UK Singles (OCC)	9
