= Anne-Marie Ruddock =

British singer

Anne-Marie "Annie" Ruddock (born Anne-Marie Teresa Antoinette Ruddock) is a British singer best known for being the lead vocalist with a 1980s ska revival, reggae and new wave band, Amazulu. In 1984 she appeared with Amazulu on the TV show The Young Ones, performing "Moonlight Romance" in the episode "Time".

After the group broke up in 1987, she and two other former members unsuccessfully continued as Amazulu II. In 1987 Ruddock made an appearance in the Alex Cox film Straight to Hell, alongside other musicians and actors Joe Strummer, Elvis Costello, Grace Jones, members of The Pogues and The Circle Jerks, Courtney Love, Edward Tudor-Pole, Jim Jarmusch, Dennis Hopper and Kathy Burke.
