= Silk & Steel =

Studio album by Five Star
- Released: 18 August 1986
- Recorded: 1986
- Genre: R&B, dance-pop, soul
- Length: 43:12
- Label: RCA; Tent
- Producer: Richard James Burgess; Michael Jay; Buster Pearson; Pete Wingfield; Billy Livsey; Deniece Pearson

Five Star chronology
Luxury of Life (1985)	Silk & Steel (1986)	Between the Lines (1987)

Singles from Silk & Steel
- 1. "Can't Wait Another Minute" Released: April 1986; 2. "Find the Time" Released: July 1986; 3. "Rain or Shine" Released: September 1986; 4. "If I Say Yes" Released: November 1986; 5. "Stay Out of My Life" Released: January 1987; 6. "The Slightest Touch" Released: April 1987; 7. "Are You Man Enough" Released: April 1987

Silk & Steel is the second studio album by British pop group Five Star, released on 18 August 1986. The album was the group's biggest seller, reaching number one in the UK. It was also successful in France, Germany, Austria, Netherlands and Switzerland. In the United States, it was less successful than their first album, Luxury of Life, peaking at number 80 on the Billboard 200.

As with Luxury of Life, the album used a number of producers and was recorded in both the US and UK, the only common producer being Billy Livsey who again produced a track he had co-written (this time with Pete Sinfield), "Rain or Shine", which became the highest-charting UK single from the album. Four tracks including first single, "Can't Wait Another Minute", were recorded in Los Angeles with the British producer Richard James Burgess. The band's manager and father, Buster Pearson, co-produced two tracks with Michael Jay (both of which Jay had co-written), also in Los Angeles, and one with lead singer Deniece on the track she composed, "Stay Out of My Life". There were also two tracks produced by Pete Wingfield, "Please Don't Say Goodnight" with lead vocals from Delroy and "Don't You Know I Love It" written by Doris, who also sings lead on that track. The latter track was originally a B-side but proved popular so was included on the album.

The album produced six UK top 15 hit singles and three US R&B hits. As "Are You Man Enough" was a US-only single, that means seven of the ten tracks were hit singles (and as "Don't You Know I Love It" had also been released as a B-side, only two of the album tracks were not available as singles). The album itself was the ninth best-selling album of 1986 in the UK, and had achieved four-times Platinum status by 1987, denoting shipments in excess of 1.2 million copies. It spent a total of 58 weeks on the UK Albums Chart.

Silk & Steel was ranked the fourth best album of 1986 in the seventh annual Smash Hits poll, behind albums by Madonna and a-ha.

A photograph on the reverse sleeve of Silk & Steel shows the group outside the Lloyd's building in London, which was newly opened at that time.

An expanded version of Silk & Steel was released by Cherry Pop Records in November 2010.

== Track listing ==
1. "Can't Wait Another Minute" (Sue Sheridan, Paul Chiten) – 4:42
2. "Find the Time" (Paul Gurvitz, Nick Trevisick) – 4:30
3. "Rain or Shine" (Billy Livsey, Peter Sinfield) – 3:59
4. "If I Say Yes" (Michael Jay, Marvin Morrow) – 4:04
5. "Please Don't Say Goodnight" (Michael George Jackson-Clark, Clemens Winterhalter) – 4:43
6. "Stay Out of My Life" (Deniece Pearson) – 4:00
7. "Show Me What You've Got for Me" (Pamela Phillips Oland, Rick Neigher) – 3:57
8. "Are You Man Enough" (Paul Gurvitz, Nick Trevisick) – 4:38
9. "The Slightest Touch" (Michael Jay, Marvin Morrow) – 4:30
10. "Don't You Know I Love It" (Doris Pearson) – 3:58

=== 2010 CD reissue bonus tracks ===
1. "Find the Time" (Midnight mix)
2. "If I Say Yes" (extended mix)
3. "Rain or Shine" (remix)
4. "The Slightest Touch" (The Pettibone Touch remix)
5. "Are You Man Enough" (Shep Pettibone remix)

== Charts ==
=== Weekly charts ===
Weekly chart performance for Silk & Steel
Chart (1986–1987)	Peak position
Australian Albums (Kent Music Report)	80
Dutch Albums (Album Top 100)	24
European Albums (Music & Media)	21
Finnish Albums (Suomen virallinen lista)	35
German Albums (Offizielle Top 100)	51
Icelandic Albums (Tónlist)	5
New Zealand Albums (RMNZ)	30
Swedish Albums (Sverigetopplistan)	28
Swiss Albums (Schweizer Hitparade)	17
UK Albums (OCC)	1
US Billboard 200	80
US Top R&B/Hip-Hop Albums (Billboard)	22

=== Year-end charts ===
1986 year-end chart performance for Silk & Steel
Chart (1986)	Position
Dutch Albums (Album Top 100)	90
UK Albums (Gallup)	9

1987 year-end chart performance for Silk & Steel
Chart (1987)	Position
UK Albums (Gallup)	33

== Certifications ==
Certifications for Silk & Steel
Region	Certification	Certified units/sales
United Kingdom (BPI)	4× Platinum	1,200,000^{^}
^{^} Shipments figures based on certification alone.
