= Billy Livsey =

American songwriter, keyboardist, and producer

- Born: St. Louis, Missouri, U.S.
- Genre: Pop
- Occupations: Musiciab; songwriter; producer
- Instrument: Keyboards
- Years active: 1980s–present
- Publishers: Quince Music Ltd.; Billy Livsey Music
- Website: www.billylivseymusic.com

Billy Livsey is an American songwriter, keyboardist, and producer originally from St. Louis, who now resides in Nashville, Tennessee. He has worked with many musicians including Tina Turner, Kevin Ayers, Phil Manzanera, 801, Gerry Rafferty, Five Star, Gallagher and Lyle, Ronnie Lane, Kenny Rogers, and Rodney Crowell. Livsey played the keyboard solo on Tina Turner's "What's Love Got to Do with It" and keyboards on "Breakaway" and "Heart on My Sleeve" for Gallagher and Lyle, as well as on "How Come" for Ronnie Lane. Livsey founded his own publishing company called Quince Music Ltd. in the 1980s, and more recently, Billy Livsey Music, both of which are still active today.

== Career ==
Presently, Livsey has a close relationship with Nashville-based recording studio Welcome to 1979, where he often works as a session keyboardist. Livsey also houses a large portion of his collection of vintage synths, keyboards, and electric pianos at the studio. At Welcome to 1979, Livsey has worked on sessions with a variety of artists like Pete Townshend, Brendan Benson, and The Outer Vibe.

Livsey wrote the UK No. 2 hit "Rain or Shine" and the No. 3 hit "System Addict", both by Five Star, as well as the UK No. 11 hit "Give Me Your Heart Tonight" by Shakin' Stevens.

Working with Frank Musker, Livsey wrote "Listen to Your Heart" which was recorded by Diane Richards. The production and arrangements were handled by Butch Barbella and Nick Monroe. The song was a hit and peaked at No. 29 for two weeks on the Cashbox Top 100 Black Contemporary Singles chart. It also reached No. 44 on the Billboard Black Singles Chart.

== Quince Music titles ==
- "System Addict" (Five Star)
- "You Belong to Me" (Anita Baker)
- "Rain or Shine" (Five Star)
- "Give Me Your Heart Tonight" (Shakin' Stevens)
- "Our Love" (Elkie Brooks)
- "No One Can Love You More Than Me" (Melissa Manchester, The Weather Girls)
- "Button Off My Shirt" (Ronnie Milsap, Paul Carrick)
- "Are You Man Enough" (Sheena Easton)
- "She's Trouble" (Musical Youth)
- "Bite the Hand That Feeds" (Paul Young)
