= The Slightest Touch =

1987 single by Five Star

Single by Five Star

from the album Silk & Steel
- B-side: "Stone Court"
- Released: 23 March 1987
- Genre: Pop
- Length: 4:20
- Label: RCA, Tent
- Songwriters: Michael Jay, Marvin Morrow
- Producers: Buster Pearson, Michael Jay

Five Star singles chronology
"Stay Out of My Life" (1987)	"The Slightest Touch" (1987)	"Are You Man Enough?" (1987)

Music video
- "The Slightest Touch" on YouTube

"The Slightest Touch" is a song by the British pop group Five Star. Released as the sixth single from their second album, Silk & Steel, Five Star chose Shep Pettibone to remix the album track for release as a single. It reached number four on the UK singles chart, becoming the group's final top-10 hit.

== Track listings ==
7-inch vinyl

A. "The Slightest Touch" (Shep Pettibone 7-inch mix)
B. "Stone Court"

2×7-inch single

A. "The Slightest Touch" (Shep Pettibone 7-inch mix)
B. "Stone Court"
C. "Hide and Seek" (7-inch edit)
D. "Crazy"

12-inch single

1. "The Slightest Touch" (The Pettibone Touch remix)
2. "The Slightest Touch" (House Touch)
3. "Stone Court"
4. "The Slightest Touch" (Slightest dub)

Cassette single

1. "The Slightest Touch" (Shep Pettibone 7-inch mix)
2. "Find the Time" (Shep Pettibone remix—part 1)
3. "Stone Court"
4. "If I Say Yes" (Lew Hahn New York remix)

== Charts ==
=== Weekly charts ===
Chart (1987)	Peak position
Europe (European Hot 100 Singles)	37
Ireland (IRMA)	2
Netherlands (Dutch Top 40)	29
Netherlands (Single Top 100)	20
UK Singles (OCC)	4

=== Year-end charts ===
Chart (1987)	Position
UK Singles (OCC)	79

== Steps version ==
"The Slightest Touch"

Single by Steps

from the album What the Future Holds Pt. 2
- Released: 20 August 2021
- Length: 3:27
- Label: BMG
- Songwriters: Michael Jay, Marvin Morrow

Steps singles chronology
"Take Me for a Ride" (2021)	"The Slightest Touch" (2021)	"A Hundred Years of Winter" (2021)

Audio video
- "The Slightest Touch" on YouTube

British group Steps released a version of "The Slightest Touch" as the third single from their seventh studio album, What the Future Holds Pt. 2. The cover was announced on 19 August 2021 via the band's Instagram account.

In a statement, the band said "We are such massive fans of Five Star, when we started brainstorming a possible cover idea to include on What the Future Holds Pt. 2 this felt like the natural choice. They are absolute idols of ours and have always dreamed about giving one of their songs a euphoric Steps makeover". Five Star gave the cover their seal of approval, saying Steps had "nailed" the song and they loved the band's take on it.

=== Track listing ===
Digital EP

1. "The Slightest Touch" – 3:27
2. "Take Me for a Ride" (Single Mix) – 3:16
3. "Take Me for a Ride" (Initial Talk Remix Edit) – 3:44
4. "Take Me for a Ride" (Shortland Remix Edit) – 3:22
5. "Take Me for a Ride" (7th Heaven Remix Edit) – 3:32
6. "Take Me for a Ride" (Shortland Club Mix) – 6:12

Remixes EP

1. "The Slightest Touch" – 3:27
2. "The Slightest Touch" (Shortland Remix) [Edit] – 3:04
3. "The Slightest Touch" (Shanghai Surprize Remix) [Edit] – 3:37
4. "The Slightest Touch" (7th Heaven Extended Mix) – 6:00
5. "The Slightest Touch" (Shortland Club Mix) – 6:03
6. "The Slightest Touch" (Shanghai Surprize Club Mix) – 6:22

Remixes

1. "The Slightest Touch" – 3:27
2. "The Slightest Touch" (Shortland Remix) [Edit] – 3:04
3. "The Slightest Touch" (Shanghai Surprize Remix) [Edit] – 3:37
4. "The Slightest Touch" (7th Heaven Extended Mix) – 6:00
5. "The Slightest Touch" (Acoustic) – 3:30
6. "The Slightest Touch" (Shortland Club Mix) – 6:03
7. "The Slightest Touch" (Shanghai Surprize Club Mix) – 6:22

=== Charts ===
Chart (2021)	Peak position
UK Singles Downloads (OCC)	9

== Other versions ==
"The Slightest Touch" was covered by Louise for her compilation album Changing Faces: The Best of Louise. This version of the song was based on the album mix and was not released as a single.

Liverpool DJ and producer Mike Di Scala Released A vinyl bootleg house rework of the track in 2005 under his initials of MDS. The track went on to become A big club hit in Liverpool’s funky house scene.
