= Find the Time =

1986 single by Five Star

Single by Five Star

from the album Silk & Steel
- B-side: "Sky"
- Released: 20 June 1986
- Genre: Pop
- Length: 4:29
- Label: RCA, Tent
- Songwriters: Paul Gurvitz, Nick Trevisick
- Producer: Richard James Burgess

Five Star singles chronology
"Can't Wait Another Minute" (1986)	"Find the Time" (1986)	"Rain or Shine" (1986)

"Find the Time" is a song by the British pop music group Five Star. The song was written by Nick Trevisick and Paul Gurvitz, who had written the single "R.S.V.P." for the band the previous year. It was the second single released from their second album, Silk & Steel, and peaked at number seven on the UK Singles Chart in August 1986. The video features the band performing a dance routine alongside the River Thames and the Houses of Parliament in London.

== Track listings ==
7-inch single

A. "Find the Time"
B. "Sky"

12-inch single 1

1. "Find the Time" (Midnight Mix)
2. "Find the Time" (dub)
3. "Sky"
4. "Find the Time" (single version)

12-inch single 2

1. "Find the Time" (Shep Pettibone remix)
2. "Find the Time" (dub mix)
3. "Sky"
4. "Find the Time" (Midnight Mix)

== Charts ==
Chart (1986)	Peak position
Belgium (Ultratop 50 Flanders)	32
Europe (European Hot 100 Singles)	15
Ireland (IRMA)	4
Netherlands (Dutch Top 40)	20
Netherlands (Single Top 100)	27
New Zealand (Recorded Music NZ)	32
Switzerland (Schweizer Hitparade)	14
UK Singles (OCC)	7
West Germany (GfK)	42
