= Too Good to Be Forgotten (song) =

1974 single by the Chi-Lites

Single by the Chi-Lites
- B-side: "There Will Never Be Any Peace (Until God is Seated at the Conference Table)"
- Released: 1974
- Genre: Soul; calypso
- Length: 3:20
- Label: Brunswick
- Songwriters: Eugene Record; Barbara Acklin
- Producer: Eugene Record

The Chi-Lites singles chronology
| "Homely Girl" (1973) | "Too Good to Be Forgotten" (1974) | "You Got to Be the One" (1974) |

"Too Good to Be Forgotten" is a song originally by The Chi-Lites in 1974 reaching no. 10 in the UK singles chart. However it was a bigger hit for Amazulu in 1986 from their album Amazulu. It reached no. 5 on the UK singles chart, making it their highest charting and only top 10 single on that chart. The song has also been covered by John Holt.

== Track listing and formats ==
- US 7-inch single

A. "Too Good to Be Forgotten" – 3:20
B. "There Will Never Be Any Peace (Until God is Seated at the Conference Table)" – 3:29

== Charts ==
Weekly chart performance for "Too Good to Be Forgotten"
| Chart (1974–1975) | Peak position |
|---|---|
| UK Singles (OCC) | 10 |

== Amazulu version ==
"Too Good to Be Forgotten"

Single by Amazulu

from the album Amazulu
- B-side: "Sez Who"
- Released: 1986
- Genre: Reggae
- Length: 3:00
- Label: Island
- Songwriters: Eugene Record; Barbara Acklin
- Producer: Christopher Neil

Amazulu singles chronology
| "The Things the Lonely Do" (1986) | "Too Good to Be Forgotten" (1986) | "Montego Bay" (1986) |

=== Track listing and formats ===
- UK 7-inch single

A. "Too Good to Be Forgotten" – 3:00
B. "Sez Who" – 4:06

- UK 12-inch single

A. "Too Good to Be Forgotten" – 5:32
B. "Sez Who" – 7:49

=== Charts ===
Weekly chart performance for "Too Good to Be Forgotten"
| Chart (1986) | Peak position |
|---|---|
| Belgium (Ultratop 50 Flanders) | 27 |
| Ireland (IRMA) | 6 |
| Netherlands (Dutch Top 40) | 26 |
| New Zealand (Recorded Music NZ) | 39 |
| UK Singles (OCC) | 5 |
| West Germany (GfK) | 31 |
