= The Mask of Orpheus =

1986 opera by Harrison Birtwhistle

- Opera by Harrison Birtwistle
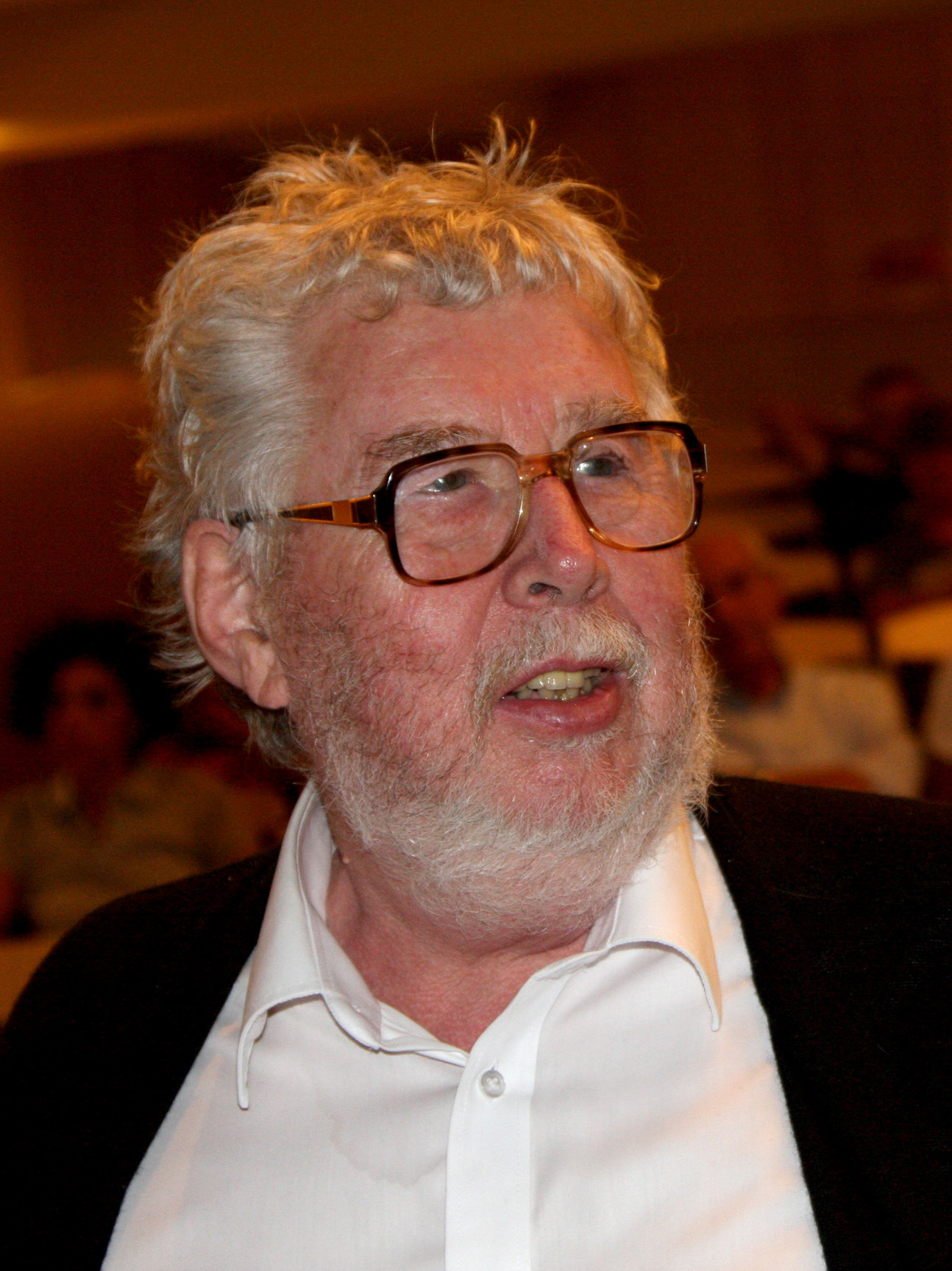
- The composer in 2008
- Librettist: Peter Zinovieff
- Language: English
- Based on: Orpheus myth
- Premiere: 21 May 1986; English National Opera, London

The Mask of Orpheus is an opera with music by Harrison Birtwistle, electronic music realised by Barry Anderson and a libretto by Peter Zinovieff. It was premiered in London at the English National Opera on 21 May 1986 to great critical acclaim. A recorded version conducted by Andrew Davis and Martyn Brabbins has also received good reviews. A new production of the opera was staged at the English National Opera in 2019, conducted by Martyn Brabbins and James Henshaw.

The opera is around three hours long.

== Synopsis ==
The structure of the opera's plot is complex. Rather than telling a story by starting at A and going through B to C, The Mask of Orpheus explores the Orpheus myth in a number of directions at once, examining the various contradictions which are in the various versions of the myth.

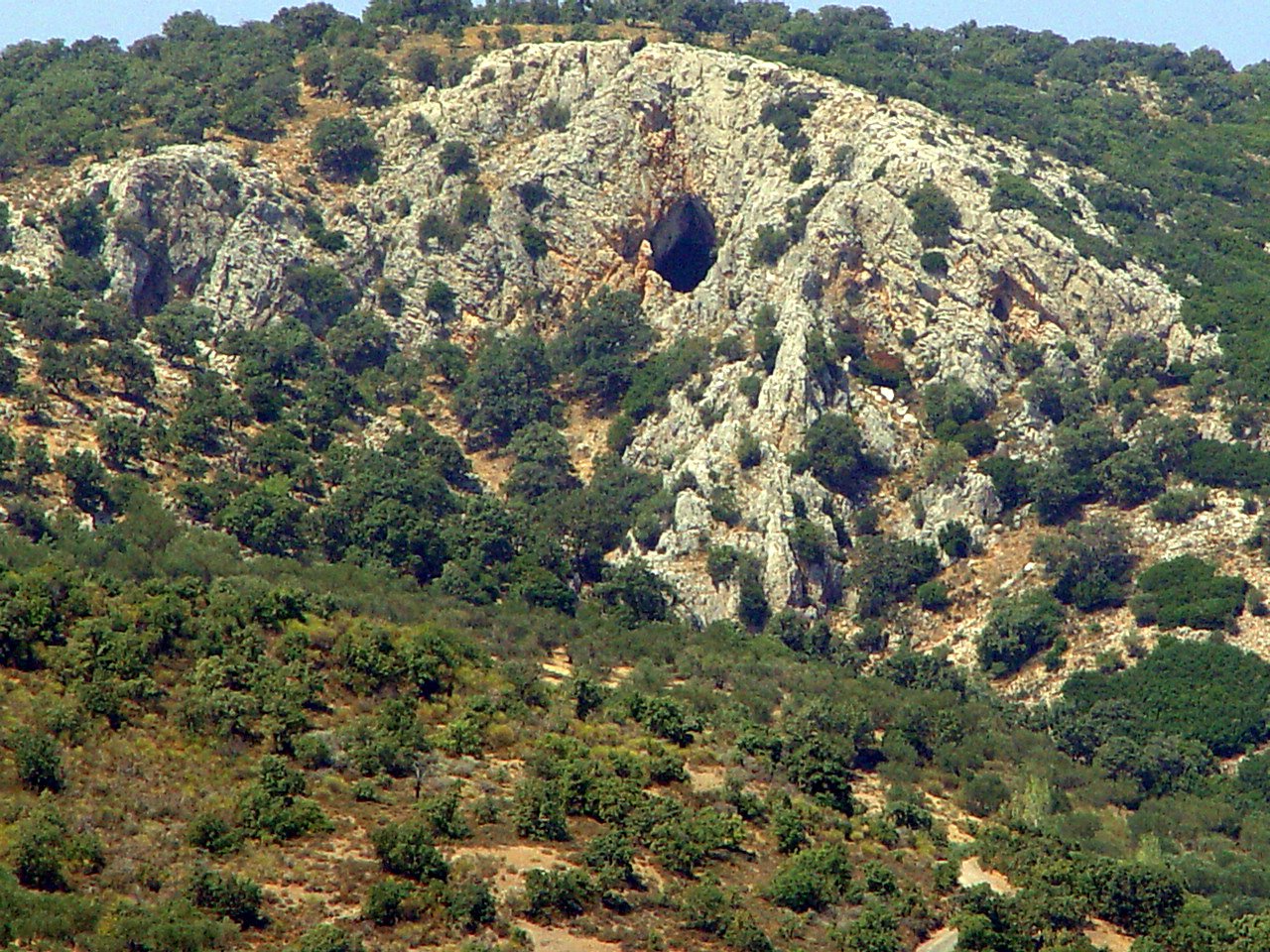
Cave of Orpheus' oracle in Antissa, Lesbos

This is done by a very elaborate stage design, whereby the stage is divided into a number of different areas, each containing its own part of the action. In addition, each of the major characters – Orpheus, Eurydice and Aristaeus – appear in three forms: as a singer who represents their human forms; as a mime, representing their heroic selves; and as a puppet, representing their myths. Also, individual events may occur within the opera on several occasions, as they are being predicted, as they happen, and as they are being remembered.

An example of this process in action is the seduction of Eurydice by Aristaeus. When first seen in act 1, this event is shown simultaneously in two different versions: in one, Eurydice is raped by Aristaeus before dying; in the other she is not. Later, in act 2, Orpheus remembers this event, but now it is Orpheus, not Aristaeus, who is seducing Eurydice before her death.

Because of the complex structure of the work, it is difficult to provide a detailed synopsis. However, the opera's story might be broadly said to be as follows:

=== Act 1 ===
Orpheus and Eurydice fall in love and marry. Eurydice later dies from a snake bite, and Orpheus consults the Oracle of the Dead, intending to follow her to the Underworld.

=== Act 2 ===
Orpheus journeys to the Underworld through seventeen arches, each with a symbolic name. On his journey back, he believes Eurydice is following him, but it is actually Persephone and the mime Eurydice. Orpheus goes back for Eurydice but realises she cannot follow him. Orpheus hangs himself. The act ends with Orpheus waking up, realising that his journey to the Underworld was a dream.

The Seventeen Arches

Each of the arches that Orpheus must travel through is given a symbolic name.

- 1st arch – The Arch of Countryside
- 2nd arch – The Arch of Crowds
- 3rd arch – The Arch of Evening
- 4th arch – The Arch of Contrast
- 5th arch – The Arch of Dying
- 6th arch – The Arch of Wings
- 7th arch – The Arch of Colors
- 8th arch – The Arch for Secrecy
- 9th arch – The Arch of Glass
- 10th arch – The Arch of Building
- 11th arch – The Arch of Weather
- 12th arch – The Arch of Eyes
- 13th arch – The Arch of Knives
- 14th arch – The Arch of Animals
- 15th arch – The Arch of Robes (or Roads)
- 16th arch – The Arch of Blood
- 17th arch – The Arch of Fear

=== Act 3 ===
At the start of this act, time is moving backwards: Orpheus travels back out of and into the Underworld, and Eurydice dies once more. Then time moves forwards as Orpheus leaves the Underworld again. One version of the Orpheus story is that he is then killed by a thunderbolt thrown by Zeus, while another is that he is dismembered by the women of Dionysus. Orpheus then becomes the subject of a cult and an oracle. Time flows backwards once more, and Orpheus' death is acted out again, and the opera ends with the Orpheus myth decaying.

== The staging ==
Jocelyn Herbert was commissioned to design the sets and costumes for the opera's premiere. The staging was complex, involving suns, rivers, and a flying golden carriage. Each singer wore (and sang through) a mask. Large puppets were created to change proportion on stage. All the masks and costumes were designed to appear timeless, so as to avoid placing the opera in a specific era.

== Instrumentation ==
The instrumentation is as follows.

Woodwinds

4 flutes (1st, 2nd, and 3rd doubling piccolo; 2nd, 3rd, and 4th doubling alto flute; 4th doubling bass flute)
3 oboes (1st doubling oboe d'amore; 2nd and 3rd doubling English horn)
1 bass oboe (doubling English horn)
3 clarinets (1st and 2nd doubling E♭ clarinet; 2nd and 3rd doubling bass clarinet)
1 bass clarinet (doubling contrabass clarinet)
3 bassoons (2nd and 3rd doubling contrabassoon)
1 contrabassoon
3 soprano saxophones

Brass

4 French horns
4 trumpets
6 trombones
2 tubas

Other

7 percussionists
3 harps

electric guitar
bass guitar
electric mandolin

tape

16-part mixed choir

The Mask of Orpheus, in addition to vocal and orchestral music, contains a significant amount of electronic music, which was realised on behalf of Birtwistle by Barry Anderson. Anderson's premature death in 1987, as well as a paucity of extant sketch material, has made an objective assessment of the collaboration unclear. The issue has been raised of whether Birtwistle has acknowledged the true extent of his collaboration with Anderson as a fellow composer. Anderson mapped out the electronic music in detail at the IRCAM studios in Paris between 1981 and 1984. Each act has its own electronic "aura", which goes on continuously, sometimes prominently, sometimes inaudibly; the voice of Apollo is heard on several occasions as an electronic sound "speaking" in an invented language. There are also six purely electronic interludes created by computer manipulation of harp sounds.
