= Each Time You Break My Heart =

- Picture sleeve for most of the single releases

Single by Nick Kamen

from the album Nick Kamen
- B-side: "Each Time You Break My Heart" (instrumental)
- Released: November 2, 1986
- Studio: Sigma Sound (New York City)
- Genre: Synth-pop
- Length: 4:30
- Label: Sire
- Songwriters: Madonna; Stephen Bray
- Producers: Madonna; Stephen Bray

Nick Kamen singles chronology
"Each Time You Break My Heart" (1986)	"Loving You Is Sweeter Than Ever" (1987)

Music video
- "Each Time You Break My Heart" on YouTube

"Each Time You Break My Heart" is a song by British singer Nick Kamen from his eponymous debut studio album (1987). It was released by Sire Records on 2 November 1986 as his debut single in 7-inch and 12-inch maxi formats. Kamen had gained popularity by starring in a 1985 Levi's television commercial, later deciding to delve into the music business and signed a record deal with Sire. "Each Time You Break My Heart" was the lead single from his album, written and produced by Madonna and Stephen Bray. It was originally set to be included on Madonna's third studio album, True Blue (1986), but failed to make the final tracklist. Madonna also provided background vocals on the track.

A promotional video to accompany the single was directed by Jean-Baptiste Mondino. The synth-pop song was featured in Billboard magazine's "New and Noteworthy" single list, receiving comparison to songs by the Bee Gees. It was a commercial success, reaching the top ten of the record charts in France, Germany, Ireland, Netherlands, Sweden, Switzerland and the United Kingdom. It attained Silver certification in France and the United Kingdom, and a remix of the track became a dance hit in the United States.

== Background and recording ==
Nick Kamen attained popularity in 1985 when his modelling career gave him the chance to star in Levi's television commercial. It showed him coming into a launderette to wash his 501 jeans, wearing only white boxer shorts. As he strips down he is watched by a group of women in the launderette. The advertisement had an immediate impact, with Levi's sales increasing by 800% and making it the number one jeans manufacturer. It also made Kamen a household name and a sex symbol. Singer Marvin Gaye's "I Heard It Through the Grapevine" was featured in the commercial and its sales were also boosted, resulting in the song reaching number eight on the UK Singles Chart.

Kamen later decided to delve into music, and released his eponymous debut album in 1987. Written and produced by Madonna and Stephen Bray, "Each Time You Break My Heart" was selected as the lead single from the album. Madonna had previously expressed interest in producing Kamen's record when the latter was signed with Sire Records. However, since she was busy shooting for her film that year, Who's That Girl (then titled Slammer), she chose to write and compose one song. Madonna had originally written and recorded the song for her third studio album, True Blue (1986), but it did not make the final tracklist. "Each Time You Break My Heart" also contains background vocals by the singer. The Latin Rascals handled the editing of the track, which was engineered by Steve Peck. Recording and mixing of "Each Time You Break My Heart" was performed by Michael Hutchinson at New York's Sigma Sound Studios, while Ted Jensen did the precision lacquer mastering of the song at Sterling Sound Studios in New York. An extended dance/club remix was composed by Shep Pettibone, which reached number five on the Dance Club Songs chart in the United States.

== Release ==
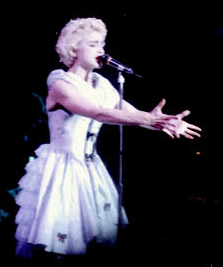
Madonna provided background vocals on the track.

"Each Time You Break My Heart" was released on 2 November 1986 by Sire in 7-inch and 12-inch maxi formats. Photographer Robert Erdman shot the cover artwork photograph of the 7-inch single, showing Kamen smiling. Another photographer Bob Merlis shot the picture listed on the back cover, which is a black-and-white image of Madonna and Kamen in a recording studio. A promotional video for the song was directed by Jean-Baptiste Mondino. It featured Kamen's then girlfriend, actress Talisa Soto and Felix Howard

== Critical reception ==
A writer for Billboard magazine listed the dance mix of the song as one of the "New and Noteworthy" singles released, believing that the combination of the writer and the producer duo, along with Kamen's looks would make the track popular. The reviewer added that the song was musically "light synth-pop" and Kamen's vocals were reminiscent of the Bee Gees. Roger Morton of Record Mirror described the single as being "vapid, exploitative, and a chart certainty", while noting Kamen's "respectable, if somewhat thin, George Michael-style vocal, set against a popping glossy disco backing".

== Chart performance ==
In the United Kingdom, "Each Time You Break My Heart" debuted at number 54 on the UK Singles Chart. After four weeks, the song reached a peak of number five on the chart, staying within the top 100 for a total of 13 weeks. It received a Silver certification from the British Phonographic Industry (BPI) for shipment of 250,000 copies (Note: In the United Kingdom, the number of sales required to qualify for Platinum, Gold and Silver discs were dropped for singles released after 1 January 1989 to the current thresholds of Silver (200,000 units), Gold (400,000 units), and Platinum (600,000 units). Prior to this, the thresholds were Silver (250,000 units), Gold (500,000 units), and Platinum (1,000,000 units).) of the single. In France, "Each Time You Break My Heart" attained a peak position of number eight on the French Singles Chart, and was present for a total of 19 weeks. The Syndicat National de l'Édition Phonographique (SNEP) certified it Silver for shipping 250,000 copies of the single. Across Europe the song also attained the top ten positions in the record charts of Germany, Ireland, Netherlands, Sweden and Switzerland. On the combined pan-European Hot 100 Singles chart, it entered the chart at number 78 on 22 November 1986, peaked at number 10 in its 15th week, and had a 34-week chart run divided into two segments with a six-week hiatus due to its release in May 1987 in France. In the United States, the song failed to chart on the Billboard Hot 100, but a club remix by Shep Pettibone achieved a peak of number five on the Dance Club Songs chart.

== Track listings ==
- 7-inch single
1. "Each Time You Break My Heart" (Album Version) – 4:30
2. "Each Time You Break My Heart" (Instrumental) – 4:35
- 12-inch maxi – Europe
1. "Each Time You Break My Heart" (Dance Mix) – 6:52
2. "Each Time You Break My Heart" (Album Version) – 4:30
3. "Each Time You Break My Heart" (Extended Instrumental) – 5:14
- 12-inch maxi – US
1. "Each Time You Break My Heart" (Shep Pettibone Extended Version) – 8:32
2. "Each Time You Break My Heart" (Shep Pettibone Dub) – 8:49
3. "Each Time You Break My Heart" (Shep Pettibone Radio Mix) – 3:55

== Personnel ==
Personnel are adapted from the 12-inch maxi single liner notes.

- Nick Kamen – primary and background vocals
- Madonna – writing, production, background vocals
- Stephen Bray – writing, production
- Michael Hutchinson – recording, mixing
- The Latin Rascals – audio editing
- Ted Jensen – audio mastering
- Steve Peck – audio engineering
- Shep Pettibone – remixing

== Charts ==
=== Weekly charts ===
Weekly chart performance for "Each Time You Break My Heart"
Chart (1986–87)	Peak position
Australia (Kent Music Report)	84
Austria (Ö3 Austria Top 40)	25
Belgium (Ultratop 50 Flanders)	11
Canada Top Singles (RPM)	64
Denmark (IFPI)	2
Europe (European Hot 100)	10
Europe (European Airplay Top 50)	15
Finland (Suomen virallinen lista)	16
France (SNEP)	8
Ireland (IRMA)	3
Italy (Musica e dischi)	3
Italy Airplay (Music & Media)	1
Luxembourg (Radio Luxembourg)	4
Netherlands (Dutch Top 40)	5
Netherlands (Single Top 100)	5
New Zealand (Recorded Music NZ)	41
Sweden (Sverigetopplistan)	6
Switzerland (Schweizer Hitparade)	2
UK Singles (Official Charts)	5
UK Dance (Music Week)	7
US Dance Club Songs (Billboard)	5
West Germany (GfK)	8

=== Year-end charts ===
1986 year-end chart performance for "Each Time You Break My Heart"
Chart (1986)	Position
UK Singles (OCC)	78

1987 year-end chart performance for "Each Time You Break My Heart"
Charts (1987)	Position
Belgium (Ultratop)	56
Europe (European Hot 100)	25
Netherlands (Dutch Top 40)	57
Netherlands (Single Top 100)	68
West Germany (Media Control)	70

== Certifications ==
Certifications and sales for "Each Time You Break My Heart"
Region	Certification	Certified units/sales
France (SNEP)	Silver	250,000^{*}
United Kingdom (BPI)	Silver	250,000^{^}
^{*} Sales figures based on certification alone.^{^} Shipments figures based on certification alone.

== See also ==
- List of UK Singles Chart top 10 singles (1986)
- List of UK Singles Chart top 10 singles (1987)
