= Hits 4 =

The Hits Album 4

Compilation album by Various artists
- Released: 17 March 1986
- Label: CBS, RCA-Ariola and WEA

The Hits Albums chronology
Hits 3 (1985)	The Hits Album 4 (1986)	Hits 5 (1986)

The Hits Album 4 or Hits 4 is a compilation album released in the UK in March 1986 by CBS and WEA, with RCA Ariola now also joining the partnership from this release onwards. It followed The Hits Album and Hits 2 to the top of the UK Top 100 Album chart and remained there for 4 weeks. A VHS compilation was also released by RCA/Columbia Pictures International Video.

Hits 4 features four songs which reached number one on the UK Singles Chart: "The Sun Always Shines on T.V.", "I'm Your Man", "Chain Reaction" and "West End Girls".

== Track listing ==
Record/Tape 1 Side 1 (1)

1. A-ha - "The Sun Always Shines on T.V."
2. Feargal Sharkey - "You Little Thief"
3. Wham! - "I'm Your Man"
4. The Bangles - "Manic Monday"
5. Madonna - "Borderline"
6. The Blow Monkeys - "Digging Your Scene"
7. Belouis Some - "Imagination"

Record/Tape 1 Side 2 (2)

1. Diana Ross - "Chain Reaction"
2. Whitney Houston - "How Will I Know"
3. Alexander O'Neal - "If You Were Here Tonight (Remix)"
4. Five Star - "System Addict"
5. Paul Hardcastle - "Don't Waste My Time"
6. Whistle - "(Nothing Serious) Just Buggin'"
7. Full Force - "Alice, I Want You Just For Me!"

Record/Tape 2 Side 1 (3)

1. The Damned - "Eloise"
2. Fine Young Cannibals - "Suspicious Minds"
3. Public Image Ltd - "Rise"
4. Bronski Beat - "Hit That Perfect Beat"
5. Eurythmics - "It's Alright (Baby's Coming Back)"
6. Pet Shop Boys - "West End Girls"
7. Mr. Mister - "Kyrie (Edit)"

Record/Tape 2 Side 2 (4)

1. Double - "The Captain of Her Heart"
2. Latin Quarter - "Radio Africa"
3. Mike + The Mechanics - "Silent Running (On Dangerous Ground)"
4. Howard Jones - "No One Is to Blame"
5. Dee C. Lee - "Come Hell or Waters High"
6. Kate Bush - "Hounds of Love"
7. Electric Light Orchestra - "Calling America"

== Video selection ==
1. Paul Hardcastle - "Don't Waste My Time"
2. The Bangles - "Manic Monday"
3. Perils of Plastic - "Ring-A-Ding-Ding"†
4. Full Force - "Alice, I Want You Just For Me!"
5. Five Star - "System Addict"
6. Latin Quarter - "Radio Africa"
7. Matt Bianco - "I Just Can't Stand It"†
8. The Blow Monkeys - "Digging Your Scene"
9. Dee C. Lee - "Come Hell or Waters High"
10. Clannad feat. Bono - "In a Lifetime"†
11. Alexander O'Neal - "If You Were Here Tonight (Remix)"
12. Thompson Twins - "Revolution"†
13. Wham! - "I'm Your Man"
14. Howard Jones - "No One Is to Blame"

† Never appeared on any Hits album.

== Sales ==
Region	Certification	Certified units/sales
Greece	—	70,000
