= Can't Wait Another Minute =

1986 single by Five Star

Single by Five Star

from the album Silk & Steel
- B-side: "Don't You Know I Love It"
- Released: 7 April 1986
- Studio: Larrabee Sound (Los Angeles)
- Genre: Pop
- Length: 4:41
- Label: RCA, Tent
- Songwriters: Sue Sheridan, Paul Chiten
- Producer: Richard James Burgess

Five Star singles chronology
"System Addict" (1985)	"Can't Wait Another Minute" (1986)	"Find the Time" (1986)

"Can't Wait Another Minute" is a song by British pop music group Five Star, written by Paul Chiten and Sue Sheridan. It was originally recorded by the female vocal trio Lewis (featuring Dee, Shirley and Linda Lewis, later known as Lewis Sisters), released a month before the Five Star version as the B-side to their single "If the Love Fits", and it was also featured in the 1986 film Gung Ho.

Five Star's version was released as the lead single from their second album, Silk & Steel, in April 1986. The song peaked at number seven on the UK Singles Chart and gave the group their highest-charting hit in the United States, reaching number 41 on the Billboard Hot 100 chart and number seven on the Billboard Hot Black Singles chart.

== Music video ==
The video features the band making a human clock, with all five members becoming the "hands" of the clock. The band's car also supposedly breaks down, and are late for a concert. The traffic lights change from "Wait" to "Can't Wait" to reflect the song's title.

== Track listings ==
7-inch single

1. "Can't Wait Another Minute"
2. "Don't You Know I Love It"

UK and US 12-inch single

1. "Can't Wait Another Minute" (extended version) – 7:13
2. "Can't Wait Another Minute" (dub mix) – 4:55
3. "Don’t You Know I Love It" – 3:56

US 12-inch single

1. "Can't Wait Another Minute" (M & M remix version) – 8:40
2. "Can't Wait Another Minute" (7-inch remix version) – 5:17
3. "Can't Wait Another Minute" (M Groove mix version) – 5:17
4. "Can't Wait Another Minute" (Street Groove mix version) – 5:25
5. "Can't Wait Another Minute" (Another Minute of Breakdown) – 2:50

== Charts ==
=== Weekly charts ===
Chart (1986)	Peak position
Europe (European Hot 100 Singles)	20
Ireland (IRMA)	5
New Zealand (Recorded Music NZ)	43
Switzerland (Schweizer Hitparade)	16
UK Singles (OCC)	7
US Billboard Hot 100	41
US 12-inch Singles Sales (Billboard) Remix	19
US Dance/Disco Club Play (Billboard) Remix	5
US Hot Black Singles (Billboard)	7
West Germany (GfK)	29

=== Year-end charts ===
Chart (1986)	Position
UK Singles (OCC)	71
