= Amazulu (band) =

British reggae/ska/pop band

- Origin: London, England
- Genres: Reggae, ska, pop
- Years active: 1982–1988
- Label: Island
- Members: Anne-Marie Ruddock; Margo Sagov; Clare Kenny; Nardo Bailey; Sharon Bailey; Lesley Beach

Amazulu were a British reggae/ska/pop band from the 1980s comprising five women and one man. They achieved success in the UK charts with four top-20 hits, the biggest being "Too Good to Be Forgotten" in 1986.

== Career ==
=== Early days and success ===
The name Amazulu is taken from the Zulu language word for the Zulu people. They originally wanted to be named Amazon but an American rock band already had the name. The name Amazulu came about when Sharon Bailey and Lesley Beach went to see a South African play by the same name and met the playwright, who gave his permission to use the name.

The band was started by Bailey, the band's original manager, and Lesley, the saxophone player, together with Rose Miner, the original lead singer. With Debbie Dread joining on drums, initially all the members were female. Miner was later replaced by Anne-Marie Ruddock, and Dread was replaced by John "Nardo" Bailey, whom they called their token male. Miner went on to become a dancer, dance teacher and percussionist, performing with Quilombo do Samba in the UK and Brazil. Falcon Stuart, the former manager of X-Ray Spex and Adam and the Ants, was one of their early managers and helped promote their first single, "Cairo", to modest success in the UK, which included airplay from BBC Radio 1's John Peel.

The band started gaining appearances on television, including on The Young Ones (1984) and Top of the Pops several times, which helped to widen their fame. They achieved hits that included "Excitable", "Don't You Just Know It" (a cover version of the song performed by Huey "Piano" Smith), and "Too Good to Be Forgotten", the latter of which was originally recorded by The Chi-Lites. The band achieved a minor success in the United States with "Montego Bay" (a cover of the 1970 song by Bobby Bloom) in 1986; early the next year, it became a surprise hit in Canada, climbing to No. 6 on their singles chart. That year their eponymous full-length album was released on Island Records, although it failed to chart highly.

=== Line-up changes and break-up ===
The group trimmed down to a trio of Anne-Marie Ruddock, Sharon Bailey and Lesley Beach during 1986 as they were enjoying their greatest success. In 1987, Beach left the band and Ruddock and Bailey continued as a duo for another year, scoring the minor hit "Mony Mony". Afterwards, Amazulu recorded their second album, Spellbound, which was released in designated Asian countries including Hong Kong in audio cassette format under EMI Records. The album contained the singles "Mony Mony", "Wonderful World, Beautiful People" and "My Heart Belongs to You" (which was released under Ruddock's name only in 1988). In early 1988 they split.

Bailey, Ruddock and Beach appeared in the 1987 Alex Cox film Straight to Hell. After travelling the world and living in Brazil and Rome, Bailey lived in Buckinghamshire. She drums from time to time and is still involved in the music industry. Beach moved to Tucson, Arizona, after taking a break in the hills of Ibiza with DJ José Padilla. She went on to achieve a Bachelor of Arts degree from Prescott College for the Liberal Arts, the Environment and Social Justice and worked as a social worker in Tucson. She and Rose Miner reunited and played drums and percussion in the Samba band Quilombo do Samba, who won the Best Band in the 2002 Notting Hill Carnival. The band member who achieved the greatest commercial success in music was Clare Kenny, who joined Coming Up Roses and became a session player with Sinéad O'Connor, the Indigo Girls, Shakespears Sister and Damien Dempsey. Margo Sagov went on to graduate as an architect, played guitar with several bands and played with Rock Candy.

The band are mentioned in the song "Asbestos" by Suede, on their album Head Music.

== Discography ==
=== Albums ===
Title	Album details	Peak chart positions			
Title	Album details	UK	NZ	CAN	SWE
Amazulu	Released: 1986; Label: Island; Formats: CD, Cassette, vinyl	97	31	48	37
Spellbound	Released: 1987; Label: EMI; Formats: CD, Cassette, vinyl	—	—	—	—

=== Singles ===
Year	Single	Peak chart positions								Album
Year	Single	UK	BEL	GER	IRE	NED	NZ	SA	US	Album
1983	"Cairo"	86	—	—	—	—	—	—	—	Amazulu
1983	"Smiley Stylee"	—	—	—	—	—	—	—	—	Single only
1984	"Moonlight Romance"	—	—	—	—	—	—	—	—	Amazulu
1985	"Excitable"	12	18	—	29	41	—	22	—	Amazulu
1985	"Don't You Just Know It"	15	—	—	24	—	—	—	—	Amazulu
1986	"The Things the Lonely Do"	43	—	—	—	—	—	—	—	Amazulu
1986	"Too Good to Be Forgotten"	5	27	31	6	26	39	—	—	Amazulu
1986	"Montego Bay"	16	—	—	14	—	—	16	90	Amazulu
1986	"All Over the World"	78	—	—	—	—	—	—	—	Amazulu
1987	"Mony Mony"	38	—	—	—	—	9	—	—	Spellbound
1987	"Wonderful World, Beautiful People"	97	—	—	—	56	28	—	—	Spellbound
