= Barry Anderson (composer) =

New Zealand-born composer, teacher and pioneer in electroacoustic music

Michael Barrie Gordon Anderson (22 February 1935 – 27 May 1987), known as Barry Anderson, was a New Zealand-born composer, teacher, and pioneer in the dissemination of electroacoustic music in the United Kingdom. Internationally, his best-known work is his realisation of the electronic music for Harrison Harrison Birtwistle's opera The Mask of Orpheus.

== Biography ==
Anderson was born in Stratford, New Zealand, in 1935. His father was a civil engineer and his mother played the piano as an amateur to a high level. Anderson learned the piano and performed in New Zealand. In 1952, he won a scholarship at London's Royal Academy of Music, where he studied piano and viola (1952–56). Additional piano studies were with Edwin Fischer, as well as masterclasses with Alfred Brendel and Paul Badura-Skoda. After leaving the Royal Academy of Music, Anderson remained in the UK and taught piano privately, and later at the South Bank Institute, Goldsmiths' College and City Literary Institute in London, on a part-time basis.

During the 1960s he became increasingly interested in composition; and particularly with electronics after having heard Stockhausen's Kontakte, an experience which he said "changed the direction of his musical life". In 1971, he began to work full-time at the South Bank Institute (later part of Morley College). He set up an electronic music studio at West Square in South London. In 1975, he founded the West Square Electronic Music Ensemble, which commissioned several new works with electronics, some being broadcast on BBC Radio 3.

In 1979, he co-founded the Electro-Acoustic Music Association of Great Britain (which later became Sonic Arts Network). Between 1982 and 1985 he realised the electronic material for Harrison Birtwistle's opera The Mask of Orpheus at IRCAM in Paris, to great acclaim. The work won the 1987 Grawemeyer Award for music composition, although Anderson was not mentioned in the citation. After completing The Mask of Orpheus, he reduced his teaching work to concentrate on composition, and completed a chamber work, ARC.

Anderson died in Paris on 27 May 1987 of heart failure, shortly after the premiere of ARC. At 52 years old he was on the cusp of recognition as an electroacoustic composer of international stature. In the words of fellow New-Zealander and electroacoustic composer Denis Smalley, Anderson “was cut off in his prime”.

== Recordings ==
- Mask, Songs Penyeach, Sound the Tucket Sonance and the Note to Mount, Colla Voce (Continuum, CCD 1008, 1989)
- Electroacoustic Fanfare, ARC, Piano Piece No.1, Piano Piece No.2, Piano Piece No.3, Domingus (Continuum, CCD 1009, 1989)
- The Mask of Orpheus (with Harrirson Birtwistle) electronic music (NMC Recordings, NMCD050, 1998)

== Works ==
Anderson completed around 20 works.

- Maui (1959-64) full-length opera based on Polynesian legends of the Pacific
- Sound Frames (1964-66) for instrumental ensemble (10 players)
- Songs Penyeach (1971) for mezzo-soprano, amplified violin, bass clarinet, and percussion
- Piano Pieces 1,2,3 (1969-74) for piano, tape mix, and sine tone ring modulation
- Topograph (1973) for 3 percussion groups, filters, and ring modulators
- Synt Axis-Mix (1973) The Menace of the Flower for 8-channel tape mix
- Suntame (1974) setting of Maori creation myths for a storyteller, tape mix, electronics, piano, and percussion
- Make (1976 re. 1985) for solo flautist (bass, alto, and piccolo), electronic modulation, percussion, speaker, and 5 tape channels, stage and lighting schedule; text by Paul Hyland
- En Face De...1 (1976) for soprano and double bass
- En Face De...2 (1977) for soprano and double bass with tape delay, electronic modulation, and 4-channel tape
- Colla Voce (1978) for solo soprano
- Domingus (1978, BBC commission) electro-acoustic tape realization of poem cycle, Domingus by Paul Hyland
- Proscenium (1978-79, rev. 1983) for solo percussion, electronic modulation, tape delay, and 2-channel tape
- Sound The Tucket Sonance And The Note To Mount (1980) for solo trombone and 2-channel tape
- Electro-Acoustic Fanfare (1983) for 2-channel tape
- Windows (1984) for sound and vision—2-channel tape and slide projections (Adrian Bartlett)
- ARC (1987) for string quartet, bass clarinet, computer-generated and processed sound tapes

== Collaborations ==
- The Mask of Orpheus (Harrison Birtwistle) (1982-86) realization of the electronic music for the opera
- 6 realizations (1975-81) of Stockhausen's SOLO for melody instrument and feedback system: (1) for flute, (2) for double bass, (3) for voice, (4) for oboe, (5) for bass clarinet, (6) for trombone)

== Bibliography ==
- Electronic Music Studios in Britain - 7: West Square (in volume 17 of Contact (Summer 1977) pp.24-26)
