= Are You Man Enough (Five Star song) =

"Are You Man Enough?"

Single by Five Star

from the album Silk & Steel
- B-side: "Summer Groove"
- Released: 15 April 1987
- Recorded: 1986
- Genre: Pop
- Length: 4:40
- Label: RCA Victor, Tent
- Songwriters: Paul Gurvitz, Nick Trevisick
- Producers: Richard James Burgess, Calvin DaVon

Five Star singles chronology
"The Slightest Touch" (1987)	"Are You Man Enough?" (1987)	"Whenever You're Ready" (1987)

"Are You Man Enough?" is the name of a 1987 hit single by the British pop group Five Star. The single was released only in the US, where it peaked at #15 on Billboard's Hot R&B Singles chart in April of that year, becoming their sixth and final US Top 20 entry.

The single was taken from their second album, Silk & Steel.

== Formats and track listings ==
7" single: 5149-7-R

1. "Are You Man Enough?" (7" Remix Version) 4:15
2. "Summer Groove" 5:22

12" single: 6309-1-RD

1. "Are You Man Enough?" (12" Vocal Remix) 6:38
2. "Are You Man Enough?" (12" Dub Remix) 5:15
3. "Are You Man Enough?" (Acapella Groove) 1:23
4. "Summer Groove" 5:22

All tracks available on the remastered versions of either the 2010 'Silk & Steel' album, the 2013 'The Remix Anthology (The Remixes 1984–1991)' or the 2018 'Luxury – The Definitive Anthology 1984-1991' boxset.

== Charts ==
Chart (1987)	Peak position
Hot R&B Singles (Billboard)	15
