= I Wanna Wake Up with You =

"I Want to Wake Up with You"

Single by Boris Gardiner

from the album Everything to Me
- Released: 1986
- Genre: Lovers rock
- Length: 4:08: 6:12 (special extended mix)
- Label: Revue Records, Creole
- Songwriter: Ben Peters
- Producer: Willie Lindo

"I Wanna Wake Up with You" is a song written by Nashville songwriter Ben Peters. It was first recorded by American country music artist and actor Mac Davis and released in March 1980, and then by American country music singer Con Hunley in September that year, with both versions titled as "I Wanta Wake Up With You".

In 1986, veteran reggae artist Boris Gardiner covered this song as "I Want to Wake Up with You" (or sometimes titled as "I Wanna Wake Up with You"). Gardiner's version went to No. 1 on the UK Singles Chart for three weeks in August 1986. It was the third best-selling single of 1986 in the UK. It also reached number 1 in Australia. and number 3 in South Africa, spending 18 weeks on the charts.

The music video for the song was filmed at various locations in West London, including Westbourne Park tube station, and Holland Park. Gardiner is also seen riding in a taxi along the Westway.

The song has subsequently been covered by Cristy Lane, Johnny Rodriguez, John Holt, Erann DD and Engelbert Humperdinck.

== Charts ==
=== Weekly charts ===
Weekly chart performance for "I Wanna Wake Up with You"
Chart (1986–1987)	Peak position
Australia (Australian Music Report)	1
Austria (Ö3 Austria Top 40)	14
Belgium (Ultratop 50 Flanders)	3
Germany (GfK)	18
Netherlands (Dutch Top 40)	7
New Zealand (Recorded Music NZ)	2
Norway (VG-lista)	3
Sweden (Sverigetopplistan)	4
Switzerland (Schweizer Hitparade)	6
United Kingdom (Official Charts Company)	1

=== Year-end charts ===
Year-end chart performance for "I Wanna Wake Up with You"
Chart (1986)	Position
United Kingdom (Official Charts Company)	3
Chart (1987)	Position
Australia (Australian Music Report)	15
New Zealand (Recorded Music NZ)	8
