= Hollywood Beyond =

British pop group

- Also known as: Mark Rogers aka Hollywood Beyond
- Origin: Birmingham, England
- Genres: Pop, rock
- Works: If, More More More
- Years active: 1984-1989, 2000-present
- Labels: WEA
- Members: Mark Rogers
- Past members: Andy Welch; Steve Elliott; Dean Loren; Mike Burns; Cliff Whyte; Carol Maye; Maggie Smyth

Hollywood Beyond were a British pop group from Birmingham, England formed in 1984.

Hollywood Beyond is the brainchild of singer-songwriter Mark Rogers. Their first single, "What's the Colour of Money?", reached No. 7 on the UK Singles Chart in 1986. The song also reached No. 8 in the Netherlands, No. 21 in Germany and No. 14 in Switzerland. The follow-up single, "No More Tears", peaked at No. 47 in the UK.

An album entitled If followed on Warner Bros. Records in 1987, produced by Bernard Edwards, Mike Thorne and Stephen Hague. Former members include Andy Welch, Steve Elliott, Dean Loren, Mike Burns, Cliff Whyte, Carol Maye and Maggie Smyth.

In recent years, Mark Rogers has revived the name and uses it for his solo career, releasing the single "Rough Life" in 2000, the album More More More in 2017, a compilation of remixes for Let's Get Together in 2018, and another single titled "Troubles in My Mind" in 2019. He has also produced tracks with the Royal Philharmonic Orchestra in recent years, previewed on his Facebook page.

== Discography ==
=== Albums ===
- If (WEA, 1987)
- More More More (Bangin Records, 2017)

=== Singles ===
Year	Title	Chart positions								Album
Year	Title	AUS	AUT	BEL	NLD	GER	SWE	SWE	UK	Album
1986	"What's the Colour of Money?"	26	15	8	8	21	5	14	7	If
1986	"No More Tears"	—	—	23	—	—	—	—	47	If
1987	"Save Me"	—	—	—	—	—	—	—	99	If
1987	"After Midnight"	—	—	—	—	—	—	—	—	If
1989	"Let's Get Together (Create)"/"I Promise" (credited to Mark Rogers)	—	—	—	—	—	—	—	—	Non-album singles
2000	"Rough Life (Our Time Is Now)"	—	—	—	—	—	—	—	—	Non-album singles
2019	"Troubles in My Mind"	—	—	—	—	—	—	—	—	Non-album singles
"—" denotes a recording that did not chart or was not released in that territory.
