= Boris Gardiner =

Jamaican singer, songwriter and bassist (born 1943)

- Born: 13 January 1943 (age 83); Kingston, Jamaica
- Genres: Ska, reggae, lovers rock, soul, R&B
- Instruments: Vocals, electric bass
- Years active: 1960–present

Boris Gardiner (born 13 January 1943) is a Jamaican singer, songwriter and bassist. He was a member of several groups during the 1960s before recording as a solo artist and having hit singles with "Elizabethan Reggae" (in 1970), "I Wanna Wake Up with You" and "You're Everything to Me" (both 1986). One of his most notable credits is bass on the influential reggae song "Real Rock".

== Career ==
Born in the Rollington Town area of Kingston, Jamaica, Gardiner attended Franklin Town Government School and St Monica's College, dropping out of education after being diagnosed with tachycardia.

In 1960 he joined Richard Ace's band the Rhythm Aces, which also included Delano Stewart, later of the Gaylads. With the group he recorded "Angella", and the local hits "A Thousand Teardrops" and "C-H-R-I-S-T-M-A-S" (written with his brother Barrington). The group split up and by 1963 Gardiner had joined Kes Chin and The Souvenirs as vocalist, and began learning guitar. He went on to join Carlos Malcolm & the Afro Caribs with whom he started playing electric bass after the original bassist left, and when that band ended he started his own group, the Broncos, named after the Bronco Club where they had a residency. He later played with Byron Lee's Dragonaires. In the late 1960s and 1970s he worked extensively as a session musician as a member of the Now Generation, The Upsetters, The Aggrovators, and The Crystallites. While working at Studio One he played on hits such as The Heptones' "On Top", Larry and Alvin's "Nanny Goat", and Marcia Griffiths' "Feel Like Jumping".

As a solo artist, Gardiner had a number 14 hit in the UK singles chart with the song "Elizabethan Reggae" in 1970, a version of Ronald Binge's "Elizabethan Serenade". When the single was released in the United Kingdom, the first copies were printed with the label incorrectly identifying Byron Lee (not Gardiner) as the performer. Lee was the producer of the track. The UK singles chart printed this error for the first chart entry and the first four weeks of its re-entry into the chart. After 28 February 1970, all printings gave Gardiner credit. Gardiner told Jamaican vlogger Teach Dem on February 14, 2023 that he did not receive a penny of royalties, or any payment, for "Elizabethan Reggae".

His debut album, Reggae Happening, was also released in 1970, but did not chart. Music journalist Ian McCann said that the album "sold respectably for a reggae LP" in the UK. Gardiner's music continued to be popular in Jamaica, but interest waned in the UK. During the 1970s he continued session work, including several recordings for Lee "Scratch" Perry including Junior Murvin's "Police and Thieves".

The Boris Gardiner Happening recorded a version of "Ain't No Sunshine" in 1973 with Paul Douglas singing lead, and Boris Gardiner playing electric bass, for the album Is What's Happening.

In 1986, Gardiner recorded the single "I Wanna Wake Up with You", which became a surprise number one hit in the UK. It spent two months in the top ten. The accompanying album, Everything to Me also included the follow-up hit, "You're Everything to Me", which peaked at number 11. The single "The Meaning of Christmas" (a re-recording of "C-H-R-I-S-T-M-A-S") was also released later that year, and was a minor hit. Later, Gardiner signed to RCA Records. In 2002, a 22-track anthology, The Very Best of Boris Gardiner, was issued on CD by Music Club.

In 2015, his song "Every Nigger Is a Star" was sampled on "Wesley's Theory", the opening track of Kendrick Lamar's To Pimp a Butterfly. The song also opens the 2016 film Moonlight.

== Discography ==
=== Albums ===
- Reggae Happening (1970), Trojan
- It's So Nice to Be with You (1970), Steady
- Soulful Experience (1971), Dynamic Sounds
- For All We Know (1972), Dynamic Sounds
- Is What's Happening (1973), Dynamic Sounds
- Every Nigger Is a Star OST (1973), Leal Productions
- Everything to Me (1986), Revue, AUS No. 45
- Lover's Lane (1989), TNT
- Let's Take a Holiday (1992), WKS
- Next to You (1992), VP
- Reggae Songs of Love (Plus) (2008), Encore

=== Compilations ===
- The Very Best of Boris Gardiner (2002), Music Club
- I Want to Wake Up with You: The Best of Boris Gardiner (2004), Sanctuary/Trojan

=== Singles ===
Year	Title	Peak chart positions		Certifications
Year	Title	AUS	UK	Certifications
1970	"Elizabethan Reggae"	—	14	
1986	"I Wanna Wake Up with You"	1	1	BPI: Gold
1986	"You're Every Thing to Me"	—	11	
1986	"The Meaning of Christmas"	—	69	
1987	"Friends and Lovers" (with Gwen Guthrie)	—	97	
"—" denotes releases that did not chart or were not released in that territory.
