= Rain or Shine (song) =

1986 single by Five Star

Single by Five Star

from the album Silk & Steel
- B-side: "Summer Groove"
- Released: 1 September 1986
- Genre: Pop
- Length: 3:58
- Label: RCA, Tent
- Songwriters: Billy Livsey, Pete Sinfield
- Producer: Billy Livsey

Five Star singles chronology
| "Find the Time" (1986) | "Rain or Shine" (1986) | "If I Say Yes" (1986) |

"Rain or Shine" is a song by British pop music group Five Star. It peaked at number two on the UK Singles Chart to become the group's highest-charting single in the United Kingdom. "Rain or Shine" spent a total of 13 weeks inside the UK top 75, with five of them in the top 10.

== Background and writing ==
Doris Pearson said of making the song, "We had quite an ordeal recording that. The vocal, especially the lead vocal, wasn't happening. We tried a lot of things - moving around, taking the microphone out into the hallway - but I think it was just technique, she [Denise] was lacking at the time. It was tricky, but we got it done in the end. And they do say some of the trickiest ones are the ones that become a hit."

== Critical reception ==
Ro Newton of Smash Hits considered "Rain or Shine" as "so slow and doddery that even mouth-to-mouth resuscitation couldn't perk it up".

== Track listings ==
- 7-inch single

A. "Rain or Shine"
B. "Summer Groove"

- 12-inch single

A1. "Rain or Shine" (remix)
A2. "Rain or Shine" (dub)
B1. "Summer Groove"
B2. "Find the Time" (instrumental remix)

== Charts ==
=== Weekly charts ===
| Chart (1986) | Peak position |
|---|---|
| Belgium (Ultratop 50 Flanders) | 19 |
| Europe (European Hot 100 Singles) | 39 |
| Ireland (IRMA) | 5 |
| Netherlands (Dutch Top 40) | 16 |
| Netherlands (Single Top 100) | 18 |
| New Zealand (Recorded Music NZ) | 28 |
| UK Singles (OCC) | 2 |

=== Year-end charts ===
| Chart (1986) | Position |
|---|---|
| UK Singles (OCC) | 18 |
