= Buster Pearson =

British businessman, producer and talent manager (1941–2012)

- Born: Stedman Pearson; 4 May 1941; Jamaica
- Died: 14 October 2012 (aged 71)
- Occupations: Media producer, director, artist

Stedman "Buster" Pearson (4 May 1941 – 14 October 2012) was a British businessman and producer, and the father and former manager of the pop group Five Star. He also owned and ran a number of record labels, most notably the 1970s reggae label K&B Records and the 1980s R&B/dance label Tent Records. He moved to the UK in the late 1960s and toured as a guitarist with soul and reggae artists such as Otis Redding, Jimmy Cliff, Wilson Pickett and Desmond Dekker. He was married to Delores (née Ogeare), mother of Five Star, who also helped with his music businesses.

== Discography ==
- "Ain't it Groovy" / "My Children's Favourite" (Jamaica, Lion L16, 1972) (also issued in the UK as Big Shot BI-616 in 1973 and K&B KB5514 in 1975)
- "Big Funk" / "Pretty Woman" (UK, Action ACT4612, 1973) (credited to Buster Pearson Band)
- "La La La" (UK, K&B KB5511, 1974) (also issued as Torpedo TOR55 in 1975)
- "She's my Girl" / "I Wanner Thank You" (UK, K&B KB5512, 1974)
- "Take it Easy" (UK, K&B KB5516, 1975) (also issued as Torpedo TOR57 in 1976)
- "Pretty Girl" (UK, K&B KB5522, 1976)
- "The First Time" (UK, Tent TENT3, 1983) (B-side of Al Marshall's "Be my Guest")
