= Thrilla in the Villa =

- Kröd Mändoon and the Flaming Sword of Fire episode
- Dongalor faces Kröd Mändoon's flaming sword
- Episode no.: Season 1 Episode 6
- Directed by: Alex Hardcastle
- Written by: Brad Johnson & Peter A. Knight
- Original air date: May 7, 2009

Guest appearances
- Tony Bignell; Janine Duvitski; John Rhys-Davies

Episode chronology
← Previous "Succubi: The Dawn's Early Light"	Next → —

"Thrilla in the Villa" is the sixth episode and series finale of the comedic sword and sorcery series Kröd Mändoon and the Flaming Sword of Fire. It originally aired on Comedy Central in the United States on May 7, 2009. The episode was written by Peter A. Knight and series co-developer Brad Johnson, and was directed by Alex Hardcastle.

The episode title is a spin on Thrilla in Manila.

In "Thrilla in the Villa", Kröd and his friends battle the evil Dongalor, who has finally activated his ancient weapon, the Eye of Gulga Grymna. The episode received generally negative reviews. According to Nielsen ratings, "Thrilla in the Villa" was viewed by 858,000 households, about half the viewership the back-to-back season premiere, "Wench Trouble" and "Golden Powers", received a month earlier.

== Plot ==
Kröd Mändoon (Sean Maguire) and his friends Loquasto (Steve Speirs), Zezelryck (Kevin Hart) and Bruce (Marques Ray), having survived an explosion during a secret mission, find a notice that Dongalor (Matt Lucas) has declared victory following Kröd's death and offered amnesty (and a free mule) to freedom fighters who surrender. Since the warlock Grimshank (John Rhys-Davies) was the only resistance fighter who knew of Kröd's mission, they realize he is a double agent. After seeking advice from his ex-wife Agnes Grimshank (Janine Duvitski), they learn Grimshank is powerless without the canine tooth he wears upon a waist chain. Agnes turns the foursome into dogs so they can sneak into the castle and get close to Grimshank. They arrive at his room and learn he has acquired Pagan tears, the last ingredient needed to activate Dongalor's ancient weapon, the Eye of Gulga Grymna.

After spending the night in Grimshank's room and waking up as humans, Kröd and his men steal the vial of tears, throw the canine tooth out the window and tie up Grimshank. Kröd reveals to Aneka (India de Beaufort) and Ralph Longshaft (James Murray) that Grimshank is a traitor, but Grimshank insists he had to do it so that he could get close to Dongalor and stop him. Aneka is thrilled Kröd is still alive, but when Longshaft reveals that he and Aneka have been having sex, a disheartened Kröd gives him the Pagan tears, much to Grimshank's horror. Suddenly, Dongalor arrives with his army and Longshaft, who reveals himself to be the true traitor, gives him the tears. Kröd says the tears are fake and that he simply was trying to expose the real traitor, but Dongalor calls out his guards and takes the real tears from Kröd (Krod tries to swallow the vial, but ends up choking it up into Dongalor's hands: Aneka, Longshaft and Dongalor's advisor Barnabus (Alex MacQueen) then make cutting remarks about what he could have done with the vial). An annoyed Grimshank explains he planned to give the tears to Dongalor then use his powers to turn the weapon against him, but that he is now powerless without his canine tooth and cannot help. However, Loquasto, Zezelryck and Bruce arrive to fend off the guards and a battle ensues.

While Dongalor activates the Eye of Gulga Grymna, Kröd and Longshaft fight each other with swords. Longshaft nearly kills Kröd, but Grimshank jumps in front of the blow and dies, telling Kröd with his dying breath that he remains unconvinced Kröd is the golden one. Longshaft becomes disarmed, but Kröd can't bring himself to kill an unarmed man; when Longshaft pulls out a secret dagger and tries to stab him, Aneka throws a sai into his chest and kills him: however, Ralph "remains classy to the end". Kröd confronts Dongalor, who reveals he is Kröd's brother-in-law, having married (and divorced) Kröd's crazy estranged sister. With the Eye of Gulga Grymna about to explode, Kröd shoves Dongalor and Barnabus aside, accidentally knocking them out a window. Following advice from the disembodied voice of his deceased mentor Arcadius (Roger Allam), Kröd stabs the Eye with his flaming sword, destroying it. Aneka embraces Kröd, although a voice-over narrator reveals she will continue her promiscuous ways. Dongalor and Barnabus have survived by falling into a tree, while Dongalor's bastard son, having survived his father's suicidal task (going on a fishing boat to the middle of a lake with his pockets stuffed with rocks, knowing he can't swim), pelts them with rocks, and starts chopping down the tree they're in for revenge (the cleverness of which impresses Dongalor enough for him to declare the boy his heir).

== Production ==
"Thrilla in the Villa" was written by Peter A. Knight and series co-developer Brad Johnson, and was directed by Alex Hardcastle. It originally aired May 7, 2009 in the United States on Comedy Central. The episode was filmed in Budapest, Hungary.

== Reception ==
According to Nielsen ratings, "Thrilla in the Villa" was viewed by 858,000 households in its original American broadcast. The viewership was nearly half of the back-to-back Kröd Mändoon season premiere "Wench Trouble" and "Golden Powers", which was seen by 1.6 million households on April 9, 2009.

Matt Fowler of IGN said of the episode, "Kröd Mändoon wrapped itself up this past Thursday with about as much as a half-hearted attempt at humor and adventure as we've already witnessed throughout the season. It just wasn't that funny." Although he said the twist of making Longshaft the traitor was good, he said the episode ends abruptly, the resolution with Kröd and Aneka's relationship was unsatisfying and that practically all the jokes were unfunny, with the exception of Grimshank's dying words to Kröd: "I die unconvinced." Fowler was particularly critical of the scene in which Kröd and his fellow warriors became dogs.
