= Our Bounties Ourselves =

- Kröd Mändoon and the Flaming Sword of Fire episode
- Dongalor licks Aneka to see if she is dead.
- Episode no.: Season 1 Episode 3
- Directed by: Alex Hardcastle
- Written by: Brad Johnson
- Original air date: April 16, 2009

Guest appearances
- Dominic Coleman; Luke Allen-Gale

Episode chronology
← Previous "Golden Powers"	Next → "O Biclops, Where Art Thou?"

"Our Bounties Ourselves" is the third episode of the first season of the comedic sword and sorcery series Kröd Mändoon and the Flaming Sword of Fire. It originally aired on Comedy Central in the United States on April 16, 2009. The episode was written by series co-developer Brad Johnson and directed by Alex Hardcastle. In "Our Bounties Ourselves", Kröd and Aneka drink a magic potion to feign death and avoid capture at the hands of Chancellor Dongalor. Meanwhile, Dongalor tries to hide an ancient weapon from the emperor's visiting nephew, who seeks the affection of Dongalor's captured peasant concubine.

== Plot ==
Freedom fighter Kröd Mändoon (Sean Maguire) arrives at a safehouse along with his pig-like 'Grobble' servant Loquasto (Steve Speirs), sorcerer friend Zezelryck (Kevin Hart), flamboyant sidekick Bruce (Marques Ray) and the Pagan warrioress Aneka (India de Beaufort), with whom Kröd is having trouble moving on from following their recent break-up. Kröd insists the group is safe there, but is surprised when innkeeper Hugo (Dominic Coleman) tries to poison him for reward money, as Dongalor is offering a substantial reward for Krod and Aneka, dead or alive. An angry mob arrives to try to capture the pair and Hugo threatens to burn the stronghold down. But when his two wives arrive and meet each other, a fearful Hugo risks his life to help Kröd and his friends escape. Meanwhile, the evil Chancellor Dongalor (Matt Lucas) learns at a press conference that the Emperor Xanus is sending a weapons inspector to investigate his castle. He orders his advisor Barnabus (Alex MacQueen) to hide the Eye of Gulga Grymna, an ancient weapon Dongalor has been secretly studying.

In order to stop Dongalor from seeking Kröd and Aneka, Zezelryck creates a life suspension potion which he calls "goof juice", which will create the appearance they are dead. Kröd is hesitant to take it because Zezelryck is an incompetent sorcerer, but at Aneka's prodding they both take it and fall unconscious. Meanwhile, Dongalor and Barnabus hide the Eye of Gulga Grymna just as the cocky Lord Roderick (Luke Allen-Gale), the nephew of Emperor Xanus, arrive with his entourage to inspect the castle. Roderick constantly insults and mocks Dongalor during his tour of the castle, where he meets the peasant girl (Remie Purtill-Clarke) Dongalor previously abducted from a village after killing her father. Roderick is instantly attracted to the girl, much to Dongalor's chagrin.

Disguised as nobles, Loquasto, Zezelryck and Bruce take the bodies of Kröd and Aneka to Dongalor, seeking the reward money. Dongalor tests whether Aneka is alive by rubbing his face in her breasts and licking her face, which he declines to do for Kröd's body. However, Kröd starts to wake up and, having missed sleeping with Aneka, starts to spoon her still unconscious body. Dongalor orders his guards to kill Kröd but, seeing how weak and disoriented he is from the potion, opts to do so himself and begins taunting Kröd, planning to torture him by killing the still-unconscious Aneka, and then Krӧd. However, a mysterious man (James Murray) swings through a nearby window, knocks Dongalor and Barnabus away, saving Kröd and Aneka, who are dragged out of the room by their friends to safety.

Roderick tells Dongalor he has found no weapons in the castle, but says he has grown fond of the peasant girl and taking her with him, despite Dongalor’s protests. Later, Barnabus provides Dongalor with a letter with a plan he says will wipe out all the resistance fighters; the identity of the letter-writer, which makes Dongalor yodel with delight, is not revealed. Meanwhile, Kröd and a reawakening Aneka are dropped off in the forest by their mysterious savior, who rides off ahead without them to drive the guards off their scent; Aneka is clearly left love-stricken by the man.

== Production ==
This episode, "Our Bounties Ourselves," was a modest improvement over the double episode pilot mainly because these scenes seemed to flow more organically out of comedic situations rather than just based on the specific character quirks. The show actually garners some laughs when it doesn't rely on "Zezelryck can't do magic," or "Aneka's a whore."

— Matt Fowler, IGN

"Golden Powers" was written by Brad Johnson and directed by Alex Hardcastle. It originally aired April 16, 2009, in the United States on Comedy Central. The episode was filmed in Budapest, Hungary. A comment Dongalor makes during the press conference in which he forgets how to say the "Fool me once, shame on you" phrase is an almost verbatim reprisal of a famous gaffe made by U.S. President George W. Bush while talking to reporters.

Within a week of the episode's original broadcast, the official Comedy Central website included five deleted scenes from "Our Bounties Ourselves". In one 33-second clip, Dongalor spends time fondling, smelling and admiring the dress of the peasant girl, while singing a song by Yodeling Yorick. In another 30-second extended clip, Bruce discusses the homosexual context within the songs of Dongalor's favorite singer, Yodeling Yourick, especially in the songs "You Make My Glory Whole" and "Blowing Snowflakes". In a third 30-second, the peasant girl laughs at a joke from Lord Roderick and tells Dongalor it's the first time she's laughed since he killed her father; Dongalor replies, "Oh, so you're going to bring that up every time we're together." In a fourth 24-second clip, Dongalor orders Barnabus to conceal the Eye of Gulga Grymna and offers the peasant girl some turtle soup, then looks at her chest and says simply, "Breasts". In the final 17-second clip, Aneka and Zezelryck recall their wet tunic contest fundraiser, but an angry Kröd insists the night never happened.

== Reception ==
Matt Fowler of IGN said "Our Bounties Ourselves" was an improvement over the previous episodes, "Wench Trouble" and "Golden Powers", because the show appeared to be focusing more on jokes from the story than the initial character "gimmicks"; he said Dongalor's inspection of Aneka's supposedly dead body was particularly funny. However, he said the show feels a bit awkward to watch because there are no real scene breaks before the commercials, meaning, "Whenever we're taken out of the show to the three minutes of ads, it just feels like we're interrupting a scene in progress."
