= O Biclops, Where Art Thou? =

- Kröd Mändoon and the Flaming Sword of Fire episode
- Kröd and his friends confront "Cy" the Biclops
- Episode no.: Season 1 Episode 4
- Directed by: Alex Hardcastle
- Written by: Chris Briggs & Peter A. Knight
- Original air date: April 23, 2009

Guest appearances
- John Rhys-Davies; Jonathan Slinger

Episode chronology
← Previous "Our Bounties Ourselves"	Next → "Succubi: The Dawn's Early Light"

"O Biclops, Where Art Thou?" is the fourth episode of the first season of the comedic sword and sorcery series Kröd Mändoon and the Flaming Sword of Fire. It originally aired on Comedy Central in the United States on April 23, 2009. The episode was written by Chris Briggs and Peter A. Knight, and directed by Alex Hardcastle. In "O Biclops, Where Art Thou?", Kröd and Aneka seek a stolen diamond from a bisexual cyclops in order to join the ranks of an elite resistance council, and Dongalor tries to capture the heart of his kidnapped villager girlfriend.

== Plot ==
Freedom fighter Kröd Mändoon (Sean Maguire) and his friends try to conduct a raid on an Imperial wagon to help the Resistance's ailing finances, but they are unsuccessful when the group cannot stop bickering about their Casual Friday attire (Zezelryck is unhappy about Loquasto wearing assless chaps, while Aneka is furious at the fact Krod expects her to wear a chastity belt). While they are arguing, they are interrupted by the warlock Grimshank (John Rhys-Davies) and Ralph Longshaft (James Murray), the swordsman who previously saved Kröd and Aneka (India de Beaufort). They invite Kröd and Aneka to join the freedom-fighting Elite Resistance Council if they can retrieve the valuable Bloodstone of Alluvia diamond from the lair of an evil cyclops.

The group arrive at the cyclops' lair, but instead of a terrifying monster, they find a decadent creature named "Cy" (Jonathan Slinger) who wears bikini briefs and offers the fighters snacks and mojitos in his hot tub. Cy insists his bloodthirsty father was the one who stole the diamond, but that he did not approve of his father and would let the group have the diamond. Kröd agrees to some quick cocktails (despite Zezelryck's bad feeling about the whole thing), and they all play a game of Truth or Dare? in the hot tub, where Cy admits he is a bisexual cyclops, or "biclops", and Aneka admits she has had sex with a troll (prompting an angry Kröd to ask if there is anywhere she draws the line). When Kröd insists it's time to leave, Cy pulls a switch and traps the freedom fighters in a cage, where he plans to 'sex them to death' and make more furniture for his cave from their skeletons. However, Aneka distracts Cy by getting intimate with Kröd long enough for him to retrieve a throwing star from her underwear, and Kröd throws it into Cy's forehead.

Kröd and the group escape, tie Cy to a chair and take the diamond. Cy apologizes and explains since his breakup with "Lisa and Chad" that "I've been such a man whore, humping and eating everything in sight." Kröd and Aneka return the diamond to the Elite Resistance Council, where Grimshank confirms its authenticity and Longshaft welcomes them to the council. Later, Longshaft tells Kröd he planned to ask Aneka to spend the weekend with him, but wanted Kröd's permission due to their romantic past. Kröd approves of the idea, insisting "men-ches before wenches", but appears visibly jealous when Longshaft and Aneka ride off together...especially when he learns what Aneka's taking with her.

Meanwhile, the evil Chancellor Dongalor (Matt Lucas) and his advisor Barnabus (Alex MacQueen) set off to steal back Dongalor's girlfriend (Remie Purtill-Clarke), a peasant girl he had previously kidnapped from a village, who has been taken by the emperor's nephew. Dongalor finds her and tells her he plans to use the Eye of Gulga Grymna, an ancient weapon, to kill Emperor Xanus and steal his crown, and he wants her by his side. He proposes and she agrees, but as the two ride off together in their carriage, she begins coughing blood. Dongalor realizes she has the plague, but insists he will get medical help for her. She dies a brief time later; her tombstone is marked simply, "Cute Girl". Later, while Dongalor mourns in his castle, Barnabus cheers him up by bringing him the Bloodstone of Alluvia. Barnabus does not explain how he got it, but Dongalor recognizes it as the lens of the Eye of Gulga Grymna, a key to unleashing the weapon's power.

== Production ==
"O Biclops, Where Art Thou?" was written by Chris Briggs and Peter Knight, and directed by Alex Hardcastle. It originally aired April 23, 2009 in the United States on Comedy Central. The episode was filmed in Budapest, Hungary.

Within a week of the episode's original broadcast, the official Comedy Central website included four deleted scenes from "O Biclops Where Art Thou?". The first 75-second clip is an extended scene of Dongalor proposing to the Cute Girl, in which he discusses his empty heart and his "empty bed...well, empty except for the concubines." In the second clip, an extended scene of the hottub Truth or Dare? game, upon learning that Aneka slept with a troll who lost an eye in battle, an exasperated Kröd asks, "Where do you draw the line? Have you ever 69ed an orc? Teabagged an ogre? Tossed a hobgoblin's salad?" In the third, two-minute clip, Kröd expresses excitement about being called before the Elite Resistance Council, and Aneka expresses anger that he wanted to go without her. When the two next appear before the council together, the elder Gustav the Short and Curly and Kröd gets into an argument over whether one should have pubic hair atop their heads. In the final, one-minute clip, Kröd expresses anger upon learning of the Pagan village attack: "They can raid our villages, they can burn our crops, they can steal our cattle, but I refuse to live in a world where good men are shot in the anuses!" Kröd and his friends then get into a discussion about how to pluralize anus before visiting the village. These cuts remain in the UK version.

== Reception ==
Matt Fowler said "O Biclops, Where Art Thou?" was another "mostly flat" episode and that while a few jokes connect, most are obvious and infantile. Fowler also said he was growing tired of Kröd's constant prudishness around sexual norm-breakers, and that the Loquasto, Zezelryck and Bruce characters are growing unnecessary because, "not every joke needs to have each member of the gang chime in with a comment telling us what the joke is." However, Fowler said he enjoyed the subplot with Dongalor and his unnamed girlfriend, and said Lucas and McQueen work very well together. Doug Knoop of The Seattle Times, however, singled this episode out as one of the main reasons he liked the series: "It may not be to everyone's taste, but in last week's episode when (Krod) and his band of warriors ended up in a hot tub with a Cyclops, I knew this new outrageous parody series had found a place in my heart."
