= Today's the Day (Sean Maguire song) =

Single by Sean Maguire
- Released: 17 March 1997
- Recorded: 1997
- Genre: Pop
- Label: Parlophone
- Songwriter: Phil Thornalley
- Producer: Phil Thornalley

Sean Maguire singles chronology
"Don't Pull Your Love" (1996)	"Today's the Day" (1997)

CD2

"Today's the Day" is a song by Sean Maguire, released in 1997 as his eighth single and his first new recording since his second album Spirit, which was released the previous year. "Today's the Day" was a standalone single following his two studio albums and was also omitted from his subsequent Greatest Hits compilation. The song was a change of style in Maguire's music; while his first two albums had been pop music, "Today's the Day" was almost Britpop in style. The single was a moderate success, peaking at #27 in the UK Singles Chart.

== Track listing ==
CD1

No.	Title	Writer(s)	Length
1.	"Today's The Day"	Phil Thornalley
2.	"Good Day" (motiv 8 mix)
3.	"Now I've Found You" (republica mix)

CD2

No.	Title	Length
1.	"Today's The Day"
2.	"Things I've Forgotten To Say"
3.	"Party Zone"
