= Succubi: The Dawn's Early Light =

- Kröd Mändoon and the Flaming Sword of Fire episode
- Loquasto, Zezelryck, Kröd and Bruce hit the taverns for "Wench Night"
- Episode no.: Season 1 Episode 5
- Directed by: Alex Hardcastle
- Written by: Brad Johnson
- Original air date: April 30, 2009

Guest appearance
- John Rhys-Davies

Episode chronology
← Previous "O Biclops, Where Art Thou?"	Next → "Thrilla in the Villa"

"Succubi: The Dawn's Early Light" is the fifth episode of the first season of the comedic sword and sorcery series Kröd Mändoon and the Flaming Sword of Fire. It originally aired on Comedy Central in the United States on April 30, 2009. The episode was written by series co-developer Brad Johnson and directed by Alex Hardcastle. In "Succubi: The Dawn's Early Light", Kröd and his friends are tempted by evil Succubi during a quest to warn the resistance movement of danger, and Dongalor seeks the tears of a Pagan woman in order to activate his secret ancient weapon.

== Plot ==
Freedom fighter Kröd Mändoon (Sean Maguire), still aching from his recent break-up with Aneka (India de Beaufort), tries to return to the "single" scene with Loquasto (Steve Speirs), Zezelryck (Kevin Hart) and Bruce (Marques Ray), but finds no success because he can't stop talking about Aneka. They are interrupted when Aneka's Pagan village home is raided by the evil Chancellor Dongalor (Matt Lucas), who kidnaps all the women and kills all the men with arrows to their perineums; Krod says, "Those taint-shooting bastards." Grimshank (John Rhys-Davies), the warlock for the resistance, reveals Dongalor has raided the village seeking the tears of a Pagan woman, the last ingredient he needs to unleash the deadly ancient weapon, the Eye of Gulga Grymna. Aneka insists Pagan women never cry, but she happily agrees to stay with the handsome Ralph Longshaft (James Murray) at his villa for safe-keeping, much to Kröd's chagrin. Aneka and Longshaft proceed to have sex after making repeated provocative gestures with various food items.

Dongalor and his advisor Barnabus (Alex MacQueen) try to extract tears from the kidnapped women by torturing them, whipping them and peeling onions in front of them, to no avail. Dongalor also tries staging a tragic play with a boy saying goodbye to his dog because his father cannot afford the pet due to the death of his mother, but the Pagan women are unmoved, although Dongalor cries like a baby. Meanwhile, Longshaft tells Kröd and his three friends to go to the Hessemeel Mountains, through the Forest of Certain Death, and light a pyre at the top of a tower to warn the other freedom fighters about the pending danger. The foursome go through the forest, where they find a strong man has been savagely killed. They are approached by three beautiful wenches, who insist a group of banshees just tried to kill them. When they seek romance from the group, the homosexual Bruce is the only one who is skeptical, until the wenches bring a gay man from the forest for him. The wenches, who are revealed to be Succubi, impregnate Loquasto and Zezelryck after kissing them, as does the Incubus after kissing Bruce.

Kröd, however, refuses to kiss his Succubus because he still misses Aneka. Kröd is attacked by the demons and his possessed friends, but he fights his way loose and kills the Succubi and Incubus, freeing Loquasto, Zezelryck and Bruce. They find the tower, but Kröd realizes he has lost the key Grimshank gave him, so he instead lights it by firing a flaming arrow at the pyre. Once it is lit, however, the group is surprised when the tower explodes and collapses. Grimshank, who watched the scene from a telescope, informs Aneka that Kröd has been killed, causing her to weep on his tunic. He leaves and places the tears in a vial. Meanwhile, Dongalor is told by Barnabus that Grimshank, actually a double agent, has succeeded in killing Kröd and retrieving the Pagan tears needed to activate the weapon.

== Production ==
"O Biclops, Where Art Thou?" was written by series co-developer Brad Johnson and directed by Alex Hardcastle. It originally aired April 30, 2009 in the United States on Comedy Central. The episode was filmed in Budapest, Hungary.

Within a week of the episode's original broadcast, the official Comedy Central website included two deleted scenes from "Succubi: The Dawn's Early Light". In the first 95-second clip, Grimshank summarizes the history of the Eye of Gulga Grymna because Kröd has forgotten to read the resistance intelligence reports. In the second, 20-second clip, Bruce comforts a heartbroken Kröd by saying, "The only way to get over someone is to get under someone new", then chastises Kröd for taking his advice literally.

== Reception ==
Matt Fowler of IGN said the episode had several laugh-out-loud moments, that he appreciated the Eye of Gulga Grymna story arc and liked the twist that Kröd's prudishness actually proved to be an asset in battle. But Fowler also said many of the jokes remain too obvious and juvenile and that the supporting characters are being underused; he said the fact that Aneka has spent the last few episodes having sex with Longshaft was particularly offensive.
