= Golden Powers =

Golden Power may refer to:

- "Golden Powers" (Kröd Mändoon episode), the second episode of the first season of the comedic sword and sorcery series Kröd Mändoon and the Flaming Sword of Fire
- A Norwegian-produced sparkling fruit wine from Vinmonopolet selection that was discontinued 2006
- Golden Power Group, a battery manufacturer stationed in Hong Kong
