= Wench Trouble =

- Kröd Mändoon and the Flaming Sword of Fire episode
- Kröd tries to explain an arrow stuck in his hand.
- Episode no.: Season 1 Episode 1
- Directed by: Alex Hardcastle
- Written by: Peter Knight
- Original air date: April 9, 2009

Guest appearance
- Roger Allam

Episode chronology
← Previous —	Next → "Golden Powers"

"Wench Trouble" is the first episode of the first season of the comedic sword and sorcery series Kröd Mändoon and the Flaming Sword of Fire. It originally aired on Comedy Central in the United States on April 9, 2009, then on BBC2 in the United Kingdom on June 11, 2009. The episode was written by series creator Peter Knight and directed by Alex Hardcastle. "Wench Trouble" introduced the protagonist Kröd Mändoon, played by Sean Maguire, as well as the other regular characters played by cast members Matt Lucas, India de Beaufort, Steve Speirs, Kevin Hart and Marques Ray.

Kröd is a freedom fighter resisting the evil Makonian Empire. In the episode, Kröd and his friends try to free Kröd's imprisoned mentor General Arcadius, who believes Kröd is the part of a prophecy that will overthrow the empire. Meanwhile, the evil Chancellor Dongalor unveils the Eye of Gulga Grymna, the deadliest weapon of the ancient world, which he has recently unearthed. "Wench Trouble", like all future episodes, was filmed in Budapest, Hungary, and the producers had authentic medieval-style costumes and weapons build to maintain a realistic fantasy setting.

"Wench Trouble", which premiered back-to-back along with the episode "Golden Powers", received generally mixed reviews. According to Nielsen ratings, it was viewed by 1.6 million households in its original American broadcast, about average for that time period; it had slightly less viewers than the episode of The Daily Show that aired later that evening.

== Plot ==
The episode opens with a voice-over narration explaining that the Makonian Empire, commanded by Emperor Xanus rules the land with an iron fist and has crushed the leadership of an upstart rebellion, but that freedom fighter, Kröd Mändoon (Sean Maguire) has continued to resist, striking out at the enemy and releasing slaves and political prisoners.

Kröd enters a tavern and threatens a soldier to get the keys to a dungeon where Kröd’s mentor, the rebel leader General Arcadius (Roger Allam), is locked up. The soldier hands over the keys when he sees he is surrounded by Kröd's allies; his girlfriend Aneka (India de Beaufort), his pig-like 'Grobble' servant Loquasto (Steve Speirs) and his sorcerer friend Zezelryck (Kevin Hart). But when the guard tries to stab Kröd, Loquasto uses a crossbow to fire an arrow into his back, accidentally catching Kröd's hand as well. A fight breaks out with other soldiers in the tavern. Meanwhile, Aneka pulls aside a soldier to have sex with him to get the dungeon keys. The fight ends and the four escape the burning building with the keys.

Meanwhile, the evil Chancellor Dongalor (Matt Lucas) is told by his advisor Barnabus (Alex MacQueen) that the emperor demands to know how he will deal with the rebellion, particularly with Kröd. Dongalor claims they have nothing to fear from Kröd, who used to beat Dongalor up in the military academy with as a youth. Later, Dongalor reveals he has found the Eye of Gulga Grymna, the deadliest weapon of the ancient world, which had been lost for a millennium but was unearthed by "the finest child labor to ever feel the lash": he also ignores the warning the Eye's power once destroyed an entire kingdom, and has the bearer of bad news killed. Meanwhile, Kröd and his friends unlock the dungeon doors and liberate the prisoners. There they find General Arcadius and his new lover, the flamboyant Bruce (Marques Ray). Before the group can leave, Loquasto accidentally locks the door shut behind them, trapping them all in the dungeon.

Dongalor wants to use the Eye of Gulga Grymna to destroy a random village, but Barnabus tells him they have not yet figured out how to unlock the weapon's power, although he says decoders are working to decipher hieroglyphics on the Eye to learn its secrets. They are then informed that the dungeon has been breached and call for the guards. Meanwhile, Kröd angrily threatens a nearby guard, who tells him about a recently patched tunnel in the wall from a previous prisoner escape attempt that was recently thwarted, and then argues with Aneka when he learns how she obtained the dungeon keys. She insists that as a pagan warrioress, "sex is just another weapon in my arsenal”: when Krod reacts badly to this, Aneka storms off (prompting Dongalor to sneer the titular line, "Wench trouble, Mandoon?"). Dongalor and the guards arrive and he fire an arrow at Kröd, but Arcadius dives in front of it and is shot instead. (Humorously, Arcadius survives the arrow and just as Krod yells, "It will take more than one arrow to kill the greatest general [Arcadius] who ever lived!", several more arrows come flying into Arcadius' chest along with a spear, and an axe smashes into his head.) Just before Arcadius dies, he says the word Engamora. Kröd and the others escape through the tunnel. Barnabus tells Dongalor that Engamora refers to a prophecy that chronicles the overthrow of an empire at the hands of a "low-born swordsman", which they believe to be Kröd.

At a nearby lake, the group give Arcadius a Viking funeral, (after two failed attempts with a crossbow by Loquasto to set the boat alight, Aneka makes the shot, using her bow in an extremely provocative way), then prepare to continue their battle.

== Production ==
"Wench Trouble" was written by Peter Knight and directed by Alex Hardcastle. It originally aired April 9, 2009 in the United States on Comedy Central, then on June 11, 2009 in the United Kingdom on BBC2. In both cases as part of the one-hour series premiere along with the episode "Golden Powers". The episode was filmed in Budapest, Hungary. The producers strived to create the fantasy setting with an authentic medieval-style tone. In keeping with the time period, the costumes were created with no zippers or velcro, and the weapons were created by an armorer who specializes in creating ancient weapon replicas. Actress India de Beaufort had read the script to this episode and none of the others when she agreed to take on the role.

== Reception ==
The one-hour premiere of Kröd Mändoon and the Flaming Sword of Fire, which included the back-to-back episode "Wench Trouble" and the episode "Golden Powers", was viewed by 1.6 million households in its original American broadcast. It received a 0.7 Nielsen rating, which is about Comedy Central's average for that time period. It had slightly fewer viewers than the episode of The Daily Show that aired later that evening.

The episode received generally mixed reviews. Reuters writer Daniel Carlson said the show was "exactly as bad as you would fear". Carlson said the jokes were bad and that delivery from the actors is too exaggerated; although he praised Matt Lucas, he said Maguire and Lucas were inappropriately over-the-top. Matthew Gilbert of The Boston Globe called the show a "relentless, mediocre spoofery that so desperately wants to remind us of Monty Python and the Holy Grail". However, Gilbert said the show might work better in half-hour increments, rather than in the one-hour premiere with "Wench Trouble" and "Golden Powers". Kate Ward of Entertainment Weekly said although the show's premise had promise, she did not particularly like the execution. Ward said Matt Lucas's character "came off as Dr. Evil light", but said Sean Maguire was charming and that she laughed at some of the "juvenile jokes", including Horst Draper, the name of a prisoner accused of raping horses. Boston Herald reviewer Mark A. Perigard complimented the show's high production values, but said, "What was spent on sets didn't go into the script." He also said the concept of a comedy swords-and-fantasy show is redundant because even serious shows, like Hercules: The Legendary Journeys and Xena: Warrior Princess, are comedies to an extent.

Joe Amarante of the New Haven Register said he "laughed several times during this cable comedy", and described it as "'Monty Python' meets a Mike Myers' movie with a lead who looks like Ben Stiller". Curt Wagner of RedEye said he enjoyed the episode and the jokes that combined old and modern elements, like when Loquasto calls Krod master and he replies, "You're making a PR nightmare for me". Wagner said of the show, "The rest of the time the humor is just juvenile, but it somehow works for this show, and this network, and apparently the mood I was in when I watched it." Scott Thill of Wired magazine called the episode a mix between Rowan Atkinson's Blackadder and Mel Brooks' Robin Hood: Men in Tights, and described it as "a cable comedy perfectly suited for the male demographic". Thill also compared it to Korgoth of Barbaria, the cult hit Adult Swim pilot television episode parodying Conan the Barbarian, Matt Fowler of IGN said the show was "not uproarious, (but) it's not painful to watch either", but said the characters had a "one joke" feel to them and expressed doubt as to whether they could sustain an entire series. Fowler identified Lucas as the stand-out cast member. Verne Gay of Newsday gave the episode a "thumbs sideways", and praised the performances of Hart and especially Lucas. But the review also said the show needed to become funnier to laugh: "there's definitely some funny here, but not nearly enough".
