= Golden Powers (Kröd Mändoon and the Flaming Sword of Fire) =

- Kröd Mändoon and the Flaming Sword of Fire episode
- Aneka performs her so-called "Pagan ritual".
- Episode no.: Season 1 Episode 2
- Directed by: Alex Hardcastle
- Written by: Peter Knight
- Original air date: April 9, 2009

Guest appearance
- Roger Allam

Episode chronology
← Previous "Wench Trouble"	Next → "Our Bounties Ourselves"

"Golden Powers" is the second episode of the first season of the comedic sword and sorcery series Kröd Mändoon and the Flaming Sword of Fire. It originally aired on Comedy Central in the United States on April 9, 2009. The episode was written by series creator Peter Knight and directed by Alex Hardcastle.

In "Golden Powers", Kröd learns he is "The Golden One" who is destined to overthrow the evil Makonian Empire. But he needs help from his girlfriend Aneka, who briefly leaves Kröd because he is upset about her tendency to use sex as a weapon. Meanwhile, the evil Chancellor Dongalor tries repeatedly to kill Kröd and continues working to uncover the secrets of the Eye of Gulga Grymna, the deadliest weapon of the ancient world.

The episode featured a striptease by actress India de Beaufort as part of her character's Pagan ritual; to prepare for it, Beaufort trained at a Hungarian strip club outside Budapest, where the episode was filmed. "Golden Powers", which premiered back-to-back along with the season premiere episode "Wench Trouble", received generally mixed reviews. According to Nielsen ratings, it was viewed by 1.6 million households in its original American broadcast, about average for that time period; it had slightly fewer viewers than the episode of The Daily Show that aired later that evening.

== Plot ==
The episode opens with Kröd Mändoon (Sean Maguire) mourning the recent death of his mentor General Arcadius (Roger Allam). Kröd is accompanied by his girlfriend Aneka (India de Beaufort), his pig-like 'Grobble' servant Loquasto (Steve Speirs), his sorcerer friend Zezelryck (Kevin Hart) and Bruce (Marques Ray), Arcadius' flamboyant ex-lover. Later, Kröd tells Aneka he wants to seek couples counseling due to her tendency to use sex as a weapon against her enemies. But Aneka refuses, and says she plans to leave them to participate in 'The Raccoon Festival': a pagan religious ritual in which she has sex with 300 men. When he reacts with anger, Aneka says she is leaving Kröd and tells him, "And I thought you could have been one of the ones." Meanwhile, the evil Chancellor Dongalor (Matt Lucas) is told by his advisor Barnabus (Alex MacQueen) that they are still working to discover how to use the Eye of Gulga Grymna, the recently unearthed ancient weapon that Dongalor wants to use to gain power.

Bruce tells Kröd that the word Engamora, which Arcadius muttered to Kröd before he died, refers to a prophecy that chronicles the overthrow of an empire at "The Golden One", which Bruce said is "a slightly less clichéd way of saying the Chosen One". Bruce says Arcadius believes the prophecy spoke of Kröd, but Kröd does not believe it. They are interrupted when Dongalor and his men ride into the village and demand Kröd’s surrender. Kröd jumps forward to attacks Dongalor, but he overshoots him and leaps right into his carriage, and explains that he forgot the blade sticks in some of the warmer months. Before he can pull his sword out, one of Dongalor's guards hits him over the head, rendering himself unconscious. Dongalor ties Kröd to the back of his carriage and rides off, but Kröd escapes by swinging back and forth until the rope snaps and he is freed.

Once safe, Kröd writes a letter to Aneka, expressing remorse for how he talked to her. Simultaneously, a scantily-clad Aneka performs a seductive dance at the festival and announces she is ready to start with the 300 men. As Kröd finishes his letter, he is attacked by an assassin who overpowers but doesn't kill him...the assassin's too busy laughing at Krod's letter to Aneka. As Kröd tries to recover, he sees a vision of Arcadius, who tells him Kröd is indeed the Golden One; the blade of Kröd's sword suddenly catches fire, which Arcadius described as a sign of his power. But Arcadius said according to the prophecy, Kröd and Aneka must work together to overthrow the empire, and that an assassin plans to attack her too. Kröd kills the nearby assassin and sets off to help Aneka.

Kröd arrives at the pagan village, where he is upset to find a long line of men waiting to get into Aneka's bedroom. Kröd discovers her next customer is actually an assassin, who pulls a knife on Aneka. Loquasto, Zezelryck and Bruce (who were waiting in the queue) arrive and Loquasto fires an arrow at the assassin, but hits Kröd. Momentarily distracted, the assassin is killed by Aneka. She thanks Kröd and, although they remain broken up, she leaves the pagan ritual with him. Elsewhere, Barnabus tells Dongalor the elders have made progress in deciphering the Eye of Gulga Grymna, but that they need a crystallized lens in order to make it work.

== Production ==
"Golden Powers" was written by Peter Knight and directed by Alex Hardcastle. It originally aired April 9, 2009, in the United States on Comedy Central as part of the one-hour series premiere along with "Wench Trouble", the show's pilot episode. The episode was filmed in Budapest, Hungary. The producers strived to create the fantasy setting with an authentic tone. In keeping with the time period, the costumes were created with no zippers or velcro, and the weapons were created by an armorer who specializes in creating ancient weapon replicas. To prepare for the Pagan ritualistic dance, actress India de Beaufort was taken to a Hungarian strip club outside Budapest and received hours of instruction on how to pole dance. However, the training did not fully prepare Beaufort because she trained on a stripper pole that rotated on ball bearings, so it would move with the dancers as they spun around, but the pole used in the episode was a tree that stayed solidly in place. Additionally, the floor was wet with dew the day of filming, so Beaufort slipped and fell repeatedly during filming. Beaufort said she was nervous performing the dance, especially in front of her peers, but that it was ultimately a fun experience.

== Reception ==
The one-hour premiere of Kröd Mändoon and the Flaming Sword of Fire, which included the back-to-back episode "Wench Trouble" and the episode "Golden Powers", was viewed by 1.6 million households in its original American broadcast. It received a 0.7 Nielsen rating, which is about Comedy Central average for that time period. It had slightly less viewers than the episode of The Daily Show that aired later that evening.

The episode received generally mixed reviews. Boston Herald reviewer Mark A. Perigard called the show a "dismal effort" and said the Bruce character was such an offensive gay stereotype that he "would get shunned even on Bravo's Queer Eye". Perigard said of the episode, "Go ahead and watch, but don't blame me when brain matter starts to dribble out your ears." Matthew Gilbert of The Boston Globe called the show a "relentless, mediocre spoofery that so desperately wants to remind us of Monty Python and the Holy Grail". However, Gilbert said the show might work better in half-hour increments, rather than in the one-hour premiere with "Wench Trouble" and "Golden Powers". Reuters writer Daniel Carlson said the show was "exactly as bad as you would fear". Carlson said the jokes were bad and that delivery from the actors is too exaggerated; he also said some of the dialogue, particularly from Bruce, is "so head-shakingly bad that it evokes pity for Ray, who had to say it aloud." Curt Wagner of RedEye said he did not enjoy or appreciate the gay jokes: "Do the writers really think being gay is funny?" However, Wagner said he enjoyed the episode as a whole and particularly liked Matt Lucas, who he said was "just too entertaining as he calls for 'juice and muffins' after mistakenly killing someone".

Verne Gay of Newsday gave the episode a "thumbs sideways", and praised the performances of Hart and especially Lucas. But the review also said the show needed to become funnier to laugh: "there's definitely some funny here, but not nearly enough". Joe Amarante of the New Haven Register said he "laughed several times during this cable comedy", and described it as "'Monty Python' meets a Mike Myers' movie with a lead who looks like Ben Stiller". Scott Thill of Wired magazine called the episode a mix between Rowan Atkinson's Blackadder and Mel Brooks' Robin Hood: Men in Tights, and described it as "a cable comedy perfectly suited for the male demographic". Matt Fowler of IGN said the show was "not uproarious, (but) it's not painful to watch either", but said the characters had a "one joke" feel to them and expressed doubt as to whether they could sustain an entire series. Fowler said he liked de Beaufort as Aneka, but said the Bruce character was not funny. Kate Ward of Entertainment Weekly praised Sean Maguire, but found the jokes juvenile and said she was particularly offended by the character Aneka; Ward said, "My feminist rage-o-meter officially exploded off the charts during the episode's pagan gang-bang."
