= Don't Pull Your Love =

1971 single by Hamilton, Joe Frank & Reynolds

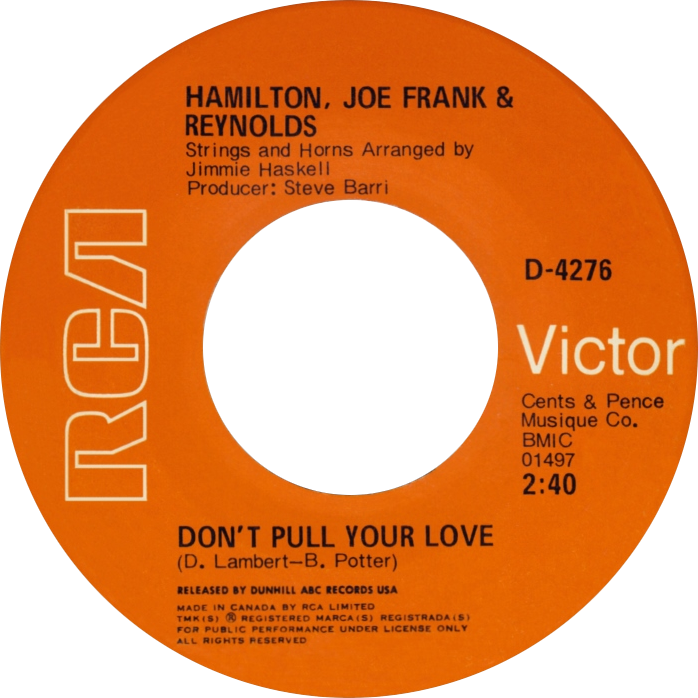
- Side A of the Canadian single

Single by Hamilton, Joe Frank and Reynolds

from the album Hamilton, Joe Frank & Reynolds
- B-side: "Funk-In-Wagnal"
- Released: April 1971
- Recorded: December 1970
- Studio: ABC, Los Angeles, California
- Genre: Soft rock; pop
- Length: 2:42
- Label: Dunhill/ABC
- Songwriters: Dennis Lambert; Brian Potter
- Producer: Steve Barri

Hamilton, Joe Frank and Reynolds singles chronology
"Don't Pull Your Love" (1971)	"Annabella" (1971)

"Don't Pull Your Love" (also known as "Don't Pull Your Love Out") is the debut single by Hamilton, Joe Frank & Reynolds which became a top ten hit single in 1971. The song was written by Brian Potter and Dennis Lambert.

== Background ==
The guys that wrote ['Don't Pull Your Love'] actually put that record out a year before we got a hold of it...We did it exactly like they did it...we liked the way the horns sounded & the way they had the tune structured & we literally kept that total arrangement on it.

— Joe Frank Carollo, BlogTalkRadio

Rumored to have been written with Elvis Presley in mind, and first recorded (as "Don't Pull Your Love Out") in 1970 by Country Store—an obscure group produced by the song's writers Lambert and Potter—"Don't Pull Your Love" had been optioned by ABC-Dunhill Records A&R vice-president Steve Barri to be recorded by the Grass Roots, who Barri had been producing for five years. However, the Grass Roots passed on the song, which Barri recalls the group considered "a bit light[weight]". Joe Frank Carollo would recall how he and fellow band members Dan Hamilton and Tommy Reynolds were performing a Creedence Clearwater Revival medley to audition for ABC-Dunhill when Steve Barri stopped the trio to play them the demo of "Don't Pull Your Love" two or three times until the trio themselves could sing it for Barri, who then arranged for Hamilton, Joe Frank & Reynolds to be signed to ABC-Dunhill that same day.

According to Steve Barri, Hamilton, Joe Frank & Reynolds themselves played on the basic tracks for their recording sessions, on which Jimmie Haskell's horn and string arrangements were later overdubbed. The credits for their debut album, which included "Don't Pull Your Love", titled Hamilton, Joe Frank & Reynolds, lists the group members as musicians (Dan Hamilton on lead vocals and guitar, Joe Frank Carollo on bass guitar and Tom Reynolds on keyboards) with additional credits for drummer Joe Correro Jr. – formerly of Paul Revere & the Raiders – and keyboardist Larry Knechtel. Both Correro (Carollo's second cousin) and Knechtel were prolific session musicians with Knechtel – who also played bass – being a regular member of famous Los Angeles session band the Wrecking Crew: it has been alleged that the instrumentation on "Don't Pull Your Love" was exclusively a work of the Wrecking Crew with the trio being relegated only to vocals, an allegation which Carollo has refuted ("we were self contained so we pretty much played on everything"), concluding that only Knechtel and Correro, as session musicians, played on the "Don't Pull Your Love" session. An instrumental entitled "Funk-in-Wagnal", credited to the group's members, was recorded to be B-side of "Don't Pull Your Love".

Recorded in December 1970, "Don't Pull Your Love" was released April 1971 and reached No. 4 on the Billboard Hot 100 dated 31 July 1971, in which month the single was certified gold for sales of one million units (Billboard also afforded "Don't Pull Your Love" a No. 4 ranking on the magazine's Easy Listening chart). On the Top 100 Singles chart in Cash Box dated 31 July 1971, "Don't Pull Your Love" was ranked at #1. In Canada, "Don't Pull Your Love" spent one week at number one.

== Charts ==
=== Weekly charts ===
Chart (1971)	Peak position
Australia (Kent Music Report)	10
Canada RPM 100	1
Canada RPM MOR Playlist	16
New Zealand (Listener)	19
US Billboard Hot 100	4
US Billboard Easy Listening	4
US Cash Box Top 100	1
US Record World Singles	3
US Record World The M.O.R. Chart	2

=== Year-end charts ===
Chart (1971)	Rank
Australia (KMR)	78
Canada - RPM 100	21
US Billboard Hot 100	42
US Billboard Easy Listening	23
US Cash Box Top 100	16

== Glen Campbell medley version ==
"Don't Pull Your Love/Then You Can Tell Me Goodbye"
- Side A of the US single

Single by Glen Campbell

from the album Bloodline
- B-side: "I Miss You Tonight"
- Released: March 1976
- Recorded: December 23, 1975
- Studio: Sound Labs, Hollywood, California
- Genre: Country
- Length: 3:22
- Label: Capitol
- Songwriters: Dennis Lambert, Brian Potter ("Don't Pull Your Love"); John D. Loudermilk ("Then You Can Tell Me Goodbye")
- Producers: Dennis Lambert; Brian Potter

Glen Campbell singles chronology
"Country Boy (You Got Your Feet in L.A.)" (1975)	"Don't Pull Your Love/Then You Can Tell Me Goodbye" (1976)	"See You on Sunday" (1976)

Audio
- "Don't Pull Your Love / Then You Can Tell Me Goodbye" by Glen Campbell on YouTube

The lead single from the 1976 Glen Campbell album Bloodline – which was produced by Dennis Lambert and Brian Potter – was a medley of "Don't Pull Your Love" with the John D. Loudermilk composition "Then You Can Tell Me Goodbye". Lambert and Potter had previously been responsible for Campbell's massive 1975 comeback album Rhinestone Cowboy. "Don't Pull Your Love"/ "Then You Can Tell Me Goodbye" was far less successful than either of the singles off Rhinestone Cowboy, the medley just scraping the top 30 of the Hot 100 in Billboard, performing much better on the magazine's airplay-driven C&W and Easy Listening charts. "Don't Pull Your Love"/ "Then You Can Tell Me Goodbye" was a major hit in Canada, reaching number 2 on the country chart and number 51 on the pop chart. Campbell performed the medley in 1977 with Cher on the Sonny & Cher Show on CBS.

=== Charts ===
Chart (1976)	Peak position
Australia Kent Music Report	65
Canadian RPM Country Tracks	2
Canadian RPM Top Singles	51
Canadian RPM Adult Contemporary Tracks	7
New Zealand (Official Aotearoa Music Charts)	23
US Billboard Hot Country Singles	4
US Billboard Hot 100	27
US Billboard Easy Listening	1

== Sean Maguire version ==
"Don't Pull Your Love"
- One of artworks

Single by Sean Maguire

from the album Spirit
- Released: July 22, 1996
- Recorded: 1996
- Genre: Pop
- Label: Parlophone
- Songwriters: Dennis Lambert, Brian Potter

Sean Maguire singles chronology
"Good Day" (1996)	"Don't Pull Your Love" (1996)	"Today's the Day" (1997)

In 1996, the song was covered by English actor/singer Sean Maguire, and released as his seventh single. It was the fourth and final single from his second album Spirit and reached number 14 on the UK Singles Chart.

=== Track listing ===
CD1

No.	Title	Length
1.	"Don't Pull Your Love"
2.	"Love by Candlelight"
3.	"Sean Interview"

CD2

No.	Title	Length
1.	"Don't Pull Your Love"
2.	"Love by Candlelight"
3.	"The Sun Shines from You"

== Other versions ==
"Don't Pull Your Love" was recorded by Sam & Dave in 1971. Their version was released on Atlantic Records in October 1971 and reached number 36 on the Billboard R&B chart. It can be found on various "best of" Sam & Dave collections that are currently available.

The song was sung by the characters Min and Max (Two-Face's henchmen, voiced by Rob Paulsen) in the animated film Batman and Harley Quinn. They perform in a henchpersons' tavern that Batman, Nightwing, and Harley Quinn visit for information on Poison Ivy.

The Grass Roots, who passed on the song, were performing it in concert by 1996, with their live version – entitled "Don't Pull Your Love Out on Me Baby" – being included on the group's 2000 concert album Live at Last.

The song was also recorded by the Lettermen (album Love Book, 1971), Sammy Babitzin (as "Kuin Tuhka Tuuleen" _{Finnish,} album Sammy, 1973, also a 1972 single release), and Guys 'n' Dolls (album The Good Times, 1976), the latter modifying the song to a duet with the lead vocals split between Dominic Grant and Martine Howard. Jimmy Helms had a 1975 single release of "Don't Pull Your Love".

Sonny & Cher covered the song on an episode of The Sonny & Cher Show in 1976.
