= Kröd Mändoon and the Flaming Sword of Fire =

2009 British-American TV series

- Genre: Comedy; Fantasy
- Created by: Peter A. Knight
- Developed by: Peter A. Knight and Brad Johnson
- Directed by: Alex Hardcastle
- Starring: Sean Maguire; India de Beaufort; Kevin Hart; Steve Speirs; Marques Ray; Alex MacQueen; Matt Lucas
- Narrated by: Michael Gambon (UK); Chris Parnell (US)
- Countries of origin: United States; United Kingdom
- No. of series: 1
- No. of episodes: 6

Production
- Executive producers: Scott Landsman (Comedy Central); Rob Bullock (Hat Trick); Simon Wilson (BBC); Peter A. Knight; Brad Johnson; Jimmy Mulville; Flody Suarez; Courtney B. Conte
- Producer: Mario Stylianides
- Running time: 28 minutes
- Production companies: Hat Trick Productions; Media Rights Capital; Watson Pond Productions

Original release
- Network: Comedy Central (U.S.); BBC Two / BBC HD (UK)
- Release: April 9 – May 7, 2009

Kröd Mändoon and the Flaming Sword of Fire is a British-American comedic sword and sorcery series created by Peter A. Knight, co-produced by Hat Trick Productions and Media Rights Capital for Comedy Central and BBC Two, which premiered on April 9, 2009, in the US and on June 11 in the UK.

== Overview ==
The series, set in an ancient fantasy realm, follows reluctant hero Kröd Mändoon (Sean Maguire), a "thin-skinned and underconfident freedom fighter" in his struggle against the evil ruler, Chancellor Dongalor (Matt Lucas).

== Production ==
The creator, Peter A. Knight, has said that the show's humor was inspired by The Simpsons, Get Smart, and Monty Python and the Holy Grail, the last of which he claims to have seen more than any other movie. The name Kröd, which is the word dork spelled backwards, was inspired by someone Knight knew growing up in school, who was often picked on; the boy was nicknamed Krod, although he failed to realise that it was an insult. The series was filmed in Budapest, Hungary, and show developers Knight and Brad Johnson were on the set at all times for the filming of each episode. Chancellor Dongalor's castle's exterior is Orava Castle in neighboring Slovakia. The flaming sword used by Kröd is not a computer-generated special effect, but an actual sword prop with a gas canister and a hose that runs up actor Sean Maguire's arm to light the blade.

The brief opening title sequence was designed to reflect a visual style of movie posters from fantasy films of the 1980s, as well as more modern fantasy movies like The Lord of the Rings film trilogy.

== Cast ==
The main characters of Kröd Mändoon. From left to right: Bruce, Kröd, Aneka, Loquasto and Zezelryck.

- Sean Maguire as Kröd Mändoon: "The reluctant leader of a rag-tag band of inept freedom fighters toiling away in obscurity." In the second episode, it is revealed that his full name is "Krödford J. Mändoon". His sword, created by his father, bursts into flame when he is challenged or in danger.
- India de Beaufort as Aneka: A "pagan warrioress whose weapon of choice is sex." She starts episode 1 as Kröd's girlfriend, but he has problems with her open sexuality and she finishes their relationship. Despite this, Aneka loves Mändoon more than the hundreds she has slept with.
- Kevin Hart as Zezelryck: A young warlock, "whose greatest magical gift is spinning a line." He knows some tricks, such as how to make flash bombs and a potion that creates a convincing illusion of death when ingested. Although he has no powers when the story begins, he later fishes the canine tooth containing all of Grimshank's magical powers out of a moat. He has shown the power to "slice the earth" which is a form of teleportation.
- Steve Speirs as Loquasto: An oafish servant, "who belongs to a race of pig-like creatures known as Grobble." Loquasto has a habit of inaccurately shooting his crossbow, sometimes injuring Mändoon. He also has a strong sense of smell and taste that he can use to detect poisons.
- Marques Ray as Bruce: "The jailhouse lover of Mändoon's late mentor, General Arcadius." He has joined Mändoon in his quest, believing him to be "The Golden One" of the prophecy that Arcadius told him. He has been shown as a capable fighter, defeating a couple of myrmidons while unarmed.
- Matt Lucas as Chancellor Donold David Dongalor: a "sociopathic Chancellor of the lowly province of Hessemeel." He and Mändoon know each other from their time training to be warriors, and developed a bitter rivalry and mutual hatred during this period. He regularly kills people who attempt to stop his evil plans, give him bad news, or just plain annoy him. He is cowardly, more likely to play dirty than fight fair and also rather vain. Dongalor is later revealed to be Mändoon's brother-in-law, as well as having a dimwit illegitimate son whom he accepts as his heir after a failed attempt on his life.
- Alex MacQueen as Barnabus: Dongalor's right-hand man, trusted servant and (often-ignored) voice of logic. He has been in Dongalor's service since Dongalor was in training, and often insults Dongalor with his dry wit, which Dongalor enjoys, and is the only person to get away with this. He has an unknown number of sons to a deceased wife, who was killed by Dongalor for adultery after Dongalor got her drunk and slept with her. He apparently has some affection for Dongalor and will jest with him, check his clothes, and try and cheer him up.
- Remie Purtill-Clarke as "Cute Girl", the captured concubine of Dongalor. Her father was murdered by Dongalor in front of her in an attempt to get Mändoon to come out of hiding. While initially repulsed by Dongalor, she eventually falls for him, realizing that a life with him would always be exciting and interesting. However, she is later revealed to have the plague, and dies shortly after, which crushes Dongalor for a short period of time.
- John Rhys-Davies as Grimshank: Longshaft's right-hand man and an actual wizard with powerful magic at his disposal. Though appearing to be a traitor, Grimshank is actually a double agent. He dies in the end, refusing to acknowledge Mändoon as the Golden One.
- James Murray as Ralph Longshaft: The leader of the resistance, beginning a relationship with Aneka until he is exposed as the real traitor before being killed by Aneka. His name is pronounced "Rafe" (like that of actor Ralph Fiennes).
- Roger Allam as General Arcadius: Mändoon's late mentor, and Bruce's lover. Appears at different times in spirit form to advise Kröd regarding his 'Golden-One' abilities and duties.
- Michael Gambon (UK) Chris Parnell (US) as The Narrator who adds context to the series' long story arc that concludes with the neutralization of the Eye of Grymna.
- Emperor Xanus: The much talked about but unseen ruler of the land. Xanus is a tyrant and has appointed Dongalor as Chancellor of Hessemeel. Xanus is apparently unaware that Dongalor possesses the Eye of Gulga Grymna and Dongalor states that he intends to use the Eye to "kill Emperor Xanus and take the Crown."

== Casting ==
Sean Maguire originally passed on the part because he wanted to do a more serious project following his role in the poorly received 2008 comedy film Meet the Spartans, and did not think the show was right for him; he also said he thought the title sounded stupid. Maguire said, "I thought, 'Who's going to watch this piece of shit?' ... I'm too quick to judge." His manager encouraged him to read the script and give it another chance and, upon reading the script, Maguire changed his mind and decided he wanted the role. Maguire worked out two hours a day for three months prior to filming the series in order to build up his physique for the role. The dynamic between Mändoon and Aneka was in part inspired by an idea Knight and Johnson had for a comedy set at a workplace, where a man and woman break up but have to see each other every day at their work setting; Maguire said he felt that aspect of the relationship gave Mändoon a very "human element" and was easy for male audiences to relate to.

India de Beaufort became familiar with Kröd Mändoon at an acting studio where she was receiving training. The teacher, who had read and loved a Mändoon script, brought it to the studio and told the students about it. Many of them tried to audition for the show, including Beaufort, so the role of Aneka proved to be a competitive one, but Beaufort eventually got an audition which led to her casting. When she agreed to take the role, she had only read the script for the first episode, "Wench Trouble", and did not know about some of the character's more promiscuous scenes in future episodes, such as her striptease dance in "Golden Powers". Upon learning more about the character, Beaufort became concerned that the role was too sexual and that she would not be taken seriously as an actress after playing the part. However, she said she quickly grew to love the character, who she believes to be a strong female character with feminist convictions: "She's saying, 'I'm equal to every other man in the world. Men enjoy sex. I enjoy sex.' You know, she's out there putting out this strong statement."

Matt Lucas said he sees the Dongalor character as a combination of Cambodian leader Pol Pot and James Bond antagonist Ernst Blofeld.

Chris Parnell, a comedian formerly of Saturday Night Live, provides the voice of the narrator in the North American version. Michael Gambon narrates the UK version.

== Episodes ==
- Note: First-run episodes are longer than the same episodes rebroadcast later the same night. In particular, scenes just before commercial breaks are cut short.

No.	Title	U.S. release date	UK release date
1	"Wench Trouble"	April 9, 2009	June 11, 2009
Kröd Mändoon, Aneka, Loquasto, and Zezelryck decide to raid Chancellor Dongalor's castle dungeon to free a group of prisoners, that include Kröd's mentor General Arcadius. But after the rescue results in Arcadius' death, things take an unexpected turn. Dongalor unveils his master plan: to reactivate the ancient and deadly Eye of Gulga Gyrmna.
2	"Golden Powers"	April 9, 2009	June 11, 2009
After Aneka ditches Kröd because he dislikes her promiscuous behavior, Kröd learns that he is part of an important prophecy and must race to save her from Dongalor's assassins; Dongalor needs an important item to make his weapon work.
3	"Our Bounties Ourselves"	April 16, 2009	June 18, 2009
Kröd fights off bounty hunters hired by Dongalor, while Dongalor worries that the arrival of an Imperial weapons inspector who puts his relationship with "Cute Girl" in danger.
4	"O Biclops, Where Art Thou?"	April 23, 2009	June 25, 2009
To earn a spot on the Elite Resistance Council, Kröd must demonstrate his valor by snatching a priceless jewel from a bisexual cyclops. Meanwhile, Dongalor must sally forth to 'rescue' "Cute Girl" from the weapons inspector's castle.
5	"Succubi: The Dawn's Early Light"	April 30, 2009	July 2, 2009
As Aneka spends some time with Ralph, Kröd is entrusted by Grimshank to the Doomsday Beacon in order to alert the resistance about Dongalor's activation of the Eye of Gulga Grymna. While making their way to the beacon through the Forest of Certain Death, Kröd and his men fall under the deception of Succubi and an Incubus who intend to have them bear their offspring. After fighting their way out, Kröd manages to light the beacon, only for the tower to suddenly crumble to the ground. Meanwhile, Dongalor races to acquire the last component for the Eye: the tears of a pagan woman.
6	"Thrilla in the Villa"	May 7, 2009	July 6, 2009
Believing that Grimshank has been working for Dongalor in secret, Kröd and the gang sneak into Ralph's palace and learn that they have been pawns in a conspiracy as Grimshank is actually a double agent and the real traitor is Ralph. Unfortunately, when Dongalor arrives with his army and activates the Eye of Gulga Grymna, a desperate battle to save the day erupts.

== Reception and criticism ==
Kröd Mändoon and the Flaming Sword of Fire received mixed reviews and mediocre Nielsen ratings in the United States. Critical reception in Britain was mixed, with some critics singling out the game performances by the cast.

The character Bruce, a flamboyant homosexual played by Marques Ray, has received criticism among the gay community, who have described the character as an offensive stereotype. Sean Maguire said the show producers expected some backlash: "you know, one way or another, you can't win. If you're too gay you get criticism. If you're not gay enough, you get criticism. ... Whenever you're playing a stereotypical character, you're damned if you do and damned if you don't. You can't really win."

On August 21, 2009, it was reported in British media newspaper Broadcast that the series had been cancelled, "after its funding partner pulled out". However, three days later it reported that the BBC had retracted the claim, stating that a second series could be produced if they were able to gain a new funding partner. According to Jimmy Mulville of Hat Trick Productions, "There is a bit of misinformation going on. As far as the writers and the controller of BBC comedy and the controller of BBC2 and Matt Lucas are concerned, we are developing a second series." However, no further series has been produced.

== UK viewing statistics ==
The first showing of each episode was broadcast simultaneously on BBC Two and BBC HD. The first two episodes were run together to create one hour-long episode; other episodes aired singly.

Episode Number	Episode	Air Date	Viewers (millions)
1/2	"Wench Trouble" / "Golden Powers"	June 11, 2009	2.047
3	"Our Bounties Ourselves"	June 18, 2009	1.33
4	"O Biclops, Where Art Thou?"	June 25, 2009	1.34
5	"Succubi: The Dawn's Early Light"	July 2, 2009	1.30
6	"Thrilla in the Villa"	July 6, 2009	N/A

It began airing on July 8 in Canada, on Citytv.

== Online game ==
On April 16, 2009, Comedy Central released a trailer for a new flash game based on the Kröd Mändoon television series. Titled Kröd Mändoon: The Rise of Dongalor, the game is a simple top-down adventure/shooter in which the player must defeat "Myrmidons" to compete for the highest score. The player may collect power-ups that grant them health, extra speed, a double shot and a triple shot.
