= Sean Maguire (album) =

Studio album by Sean Maguire
- Released: 14 November 1994
- Recorded: 1993–1994
- Genre: Pop
- Label: Parlophone

Sean Maguire chronology
Sean Maguire (1994)	Spirit (1996)

Singles from Sean Maguire
- 1. "Someone To Love" Released: 14 August 1994; 2. "Take This Time" Released: 24 October 1994; 3. "Suddenly" Released: 13 March 1995

Professional ratings
Review scores
Source	Rating
AllMusic	2/5 stars
Select	1/5 medals
Smash Hits	3/5

Sean Maguire was the first album released by the former EastEnders star, Sean Maguire. Maguire released three singles from the album, "Someone To Love," "Take This Time," and "Suddenly." The album reached number 75 and only spent one week on the UK album chart.

== Critical reception ==
Smash Hits named Sean Maguire Best New Album. Leesa Daniels wrote, "One minute he's in EastEnders, next The O-Zone, and then all of sudden he's a pop star! The single "Someone To Love" was a good start, but does Sean have an album's worth up his multi-talented sleeve? Well, just about. Though many of the tracks sound like you've heard them somewhere before, there's enough here to be worth parting with your pennies for. Listen out for "As Soon As You Know" and the absolute cracker dance tune "My Heart Won't Let You Go" which must be the next single."

== Track listing ==
No.	Title	Length
1.	"Someone To Love"
2.	"Love By Candlelight"
3.	"Take This Time"
4.	"My Heart Won't Let You Go"
5.	"No Choice In The Matter"
6.	"Suddenly"
7.	"As Soon As You Know"
8.	"The Sun Shines From You"
9.	"Devotion"
10.	"It's Always Christmas Time"
