= Run Fatboy Run =

2007 comedy film

- British theatrical release poster
- Directed by: David Schwimmer
- Screenplay by: Michael Ian Black; Simon Pegg
- Story by: Michael Ian Black
- Produced by: Sarah Curtis; Robert Jones
- Starring: Simon Pegg; Thandie Newton; Hank Azaria; Dylan Moran; Harish Patel
- Cinematography: Richard Greatrex
- Edited by: Michael Parker
- Music by: Alex Wurman
- Production companies: Picturehouse; Material Entertainment
- Distributed by: Entertainment Film Distributors (United Kingdom); New Line Cinema (United States)
- Release dates: 7 September 2007 (United Kingdom); 28 March 2008 (United States)
- Running time: 100 minutes
- Countries: United Kingdom; United States
- Language: English
- Budget: $10 million
- Box office: $33.5 million

Run Fatboy Run (also written Run, Fatboy, Run and Run Fat Boy Run) is a 2007 comedy film directed by David Schwimmer, written by Michael Ian Black and Simon Pegg, and starring Pegg, Dylan Moran, Thandiwe Newton, Harish Patel, India de Beaufort and Hank Azaria. It was released in the United Kingdom on 7 September 2007, in Canada on 10 September 2007, and in the United States on 28 March 2008.

== Plot ==
Dennis Doyle is about to marry Libby, his pregnant fiancée. However, he gets cold feet and runs away on the day of the wedding. Five years later, Dennis discovers that Libby, who has their son, Jake, has started seeing successful but arrogant Whit and realises that he has truly lost her. He finds out that Whit is running the Nike River Marathon in London, and to prove himself to his uncertain friends and, most importantly, Libby and his son, he decides to run the race himself.

He receives motivation from his two "coaches", Gordon, a well-meaning slacker who is Libby's cousin and Dennis' best friend, who has made a hefty bet on Dennis succeeding, and Mr. Ghoshdastidar, his landlord, who uses unorthodox methods of training, such as using a spatula to spank him. Days before the race, Whit proposes to Libby at her birthday party. Libby accepts and this puts Dennis in a state of deep depression. As a result, he decides to quit the race.

Meanwhile, Jake, who has formed a crush on a girl in his class, runs away upset when he discovers that she prefers another boy just because he has a ponytail. Dennis, upon being informed by a frantic Libby, tracks him down and explains to him that he will find many things he does not like in his life and he should just stand up to them and face them, rather than running away. Having made that mistake himself, he decides to race after all.

Dennis starts the race alongside Whit, who informs Dennis that he intends to move Libby and Jake to Chicago. Enraged, Dennis mocks Whit and they altercate for a while at the start of the race and, in their efforts to out-do each other, they catch up to and then overtake the professional runners. Whit, nervous that Dennis seems determined to run, trips Dennis, leading to several runners falling over, and Dennis being severely injured. Stretchers prepare to take Dennis to the hospital.

Whit continues, but is taken to the hospital after feeling pain in his leg. Libby and Jake go to the hospital to look for Dennis, but instead find Whit, who claims loudly that his injuries are the result of Dennis deliberately tripping him. The doctor tells him he is not actually injured and has only "hit the wall", something Whit often used to try and intimidate Dennis into quitting. Jake is playing with Whit's hospital bed, and to Libby's disgust, Whit calls him a "little shit".

Dennis has in fact refused to be transported to the hospital or even get medical attention and is continuing the race well into the afternoon and evening with a sprained ankle, accompanied by a growing group of supporters, including Gordon and Mr. Ghoshdastidar. A panting Dennis almost "hits the wall", but after an emotional epiphany, his goal to complete the race is restored. Later at Whit's house, Libby, Jake and Whit watch a television replay of the Whit/Dennis altercation, as the replay shows that in fact Whit had deliberately tripped Dennis and had fallen over because Dennis pulled him down as he was falling.

As Whit tries to justify his behaviour, he blurts out his intentions to have Libby and Jake move to Chicago with him. A fed-up Libby puts the engagement ring on a table, telling Whit "nobody's perfect" and storms out with Jake. The two go to meet Dennis as he arrives at the finish line. Dennis falls over just metres from the finish line and cannot get up until he sees Libby and Jake calling to him, at which point he gets up, sprints to the finish and collapses in their arms.

Some time later, notably healthier and fully recovered from his injuries, Dennis calls at Libby's house to pick up Jake. He says that he has something to ask her, but is interrupted by Jake, and says he'll talk to her later. However, just after she shuts the door, he knocks again and asks her on a date. She accepts.

In the film's postscript, Gordon — on the bridge of a new yacht — tells the tale of the race to two attractive bikini-clad women, whom he invites aboard for a drink. The camera then pans to reveal to the audience that he's, as usual, naked below the waist.

== Cast ==
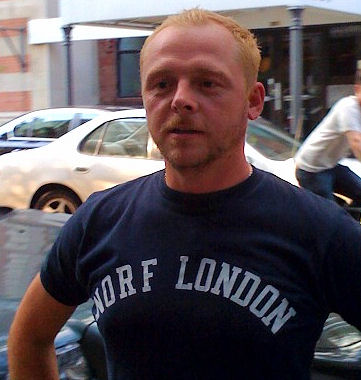
Simon Pegg portrays protagonist Dennis Doyle.

- Simon Pegg as Dennis Doyle
- Thandiwe Newton as Libby Odell (credited as Thandie Newton)
- Hank Azaria as Whit Bloom
- Dylan Moran as Gordon
- Harish Patel as Mr. Ghoshdastidar
- India de Beaufort as Maya Ghoshdastidar
- Matthew Fenton as Jake
- Simon Day as Vincent
- Ruth Sheen as Claudine
- Tyrone Huggins as Grover
- Nevan Finegan as Mickey
- Iddo Goldberg as News reporter
- Floella Benjamin as Libby's mother
- Chris Hollins as Sports reporter
- Denise Lewis as Sports reporter
- Peter Serafinowicz as Sports commentator
- Stephen Merchant as Man in suit at bottom of stairs hit by falling wheelchair
- David Walliams as Customer in Libby's shop
- Michael Johnson as Marathon runner
- Bill Bailey as Man dressed as Gandalf
- Margaret John as Libby's grandmother
- David Schwimmer as Man handing Dennis a beer during race

== Reception ==
=== Box office ===
Run Fat Boy Run topped the United Kingdom box office, earning £2 million in its opening weekend, and remained at the top of the chart for four weeks. To date, it has earned over £11 million in the United Kingdom. Worldwide, the film grossed $33.5 million.

=== Critical response ===
On Rotten Tomatoes the film has an approval rating of 46% based on reviews from 156 critics. On Metacritic the film had an average score of 48 out of 100, based on reviews from 27 critics, indicating "mixed or average reviews".

Dennis Harvey of Variety had positive notices for actor turned director David Schwimmer, calling it the work of "a thoroughly competent mainstream craftsman who imposes no individual character on formulaic material." Peter Travers of Rolling Stone wrote: "Run, Fatboy, Run stays out of sitcom quicksand long enough to make you think that Schwimmer has a knack for this comedy-directing thing."

== Home media ==
The DVD and Blu-ray were released on 18 February 2008 in the United Kingdom.

== See also ==
- List of films about the sport of athletics
