= Suddenly (Sean Maguire song) =

1995 single by Sean Maguire

Single by Sean Maguire

from the album Sean Maguire
- B-side: "You Help Me See the Light"; "Stay"
- Released: 13 March 1995
- Genre: Dance-pop
- Label: Parlophone
- Songwriters: Charlie Francis; Farrell Tiernan Lennon
- Producer: Gary Stevenson

Sean Maguire singles chronology
"Take This Time" (1994)	"Suddenly" (1995)	"Now I've Found You" (1995)

CD2

"Suddenly" is a song by English actor and singer Sean Maguire, released in March 1995 by Parlophone as the third single from his debut album, Sean Maguire (1994). It was written by Charlie Francis and Farrell Tiernan Lennon, and produced by Gary Stevenson. The song reached number 18 and spent five weeks on the UK Singles Chart.

== Critical reception ==
Pan-European magazine Music & Media wrote, "The one-man Take That offers up-to-date gossip for those who take the trouble to write to him. But don't let yourselves be distracted from the pop dance talent of the former EastEnder."

== Track listings ==
- CD1
1. "Suddenly"
2. "You Help Me See the Light"
3. "Suddenly" (Tom Frederikse extended mix)
4. "Suddenly" (Gary Stevenson mix)
- CD2
1. "Suddenly"
2. "Stay"
3. "Suddenly" (Love to Infinity mix)
4. "Suddenly" (Love to Infinity extended mix)

== Charts ==
Chart (1995)	Peak position
Scotland (OCC)	22
UK Singles (OCC)	18
UK Pop Tip Club Chart (Music Week)	9

== Release history ==
Region	Date	Format(s)	Label(s)	Ref.
United Kingdom	13 March 1995	CD; cassette	Parlophone	
Australia	17 July 1995	CD	Parlophone	
