= Take This Time =

1994 single by Sean Maguire

Single by Sean Maguire

from the album Sean Maguire
- B-side: "Take This Time" (Arty Mango mix)
- Released: 24 October 1994
- Length: 4:08
- Label: Parlophone
- Songwriter(s): Ian Allen; Sean Maguire; Gary Stevenson; Dave West
- Producer(s): Gary Stevenson

Sean Maguire singles chronology
"Someone to Love" (1994)	"Take This Time" (1994)	"Suddenly" (1995)

CD2

"Take This Time" is a song by English actor and singer Sean Maguire, released in October 1994 by Parlophone as the second single from his debut album, Sean Maguire (1994). The song was co-written by Maguire with Ian Allen, Gary Stevenson and Dave West, and produced by Stevenson. It reached number 27 on the UK Singles Chart.

== Critical reception ==
Upon the release, pan-European magazine Music & Media wrote, "The ex-Eastender is neighbouring on the works of other soap-turned-pop stars. A pop reggae tune like Sean's here should have an across-the-board appeal from Coronation to High Street." Alan Jones from Music Week commented, "This is slow, attractively loping, with reggae intervals, and moderately accomplished vocals from the former EastEnders star, but not as strong as his previous hit 'Someone to Love', and so unlikely to equal its number 14 peak." Jordan Paramor from Smash Hits wrote, "This has got a pleasant reggae feel, and some nice lyrics, and Sean sings it nicely, but it still doesn't grab you, it's just kind of, well, nice."

== Track listings ==
- CD1
1. "Take This Time"
2. "Take This Time" (Arty Mango mix)
3. "Take This Time" (Ragga mix)
4. Andy Peters Speaks to Sean – Part 1
- CD2
1. "Take This Time"
2. "Take This Time" (Arty Mango mix)
3. "Take This Time" (La Smoov re-mix)
4. Andy Peters Speaks to Sean – Part 2

== Charts ==
Chart (1994)	Peak position
Europe (Eurochart Hot 100)	88
UK Singles (OCC)	27
UK Airplay (Music Week)	32
