= Good Day (Sean Maguire song) =

Single by Sean Maguire

from the album Spirit
- Released: 13 May 1996
- Recorded: 1996
- Genre: Pop
- Label: Parlophone
- Songwriters: Sean Maguire, Martin Brannigan, Ray Hedges

Sean Maguire singles chronology
"You to Me Are Everything" (1995)	"Good Day" (1996)	"Don't Pull Your Love" (1996)

CD2

"Good Day" is a song by Sean Maguire, released in May 1996 as his sixth single to promote Maguire's second album, Spirit. The single was his most successful, reaching number 12 in the UK Singles Chart, his highest chart position to date.

== Track listing ==
CD1

1. "Good Day"
2. "Good Day" (Motiv 8 Northside Mix)
3. "Good Day" (Motiv 8 Southside Dub)
4. "Good Day" (Bear Mix)

CD2

1. "Good Day"
2. "No Choice In The Matter"
3. "Count On Me"
4. "I'm The One For You"
