= Someone to Love (Sean Maguire song) =

1994 single by Sean Maguire

Single by Sean Maguire

from the album Sean Maguire
- B-side: "Devotion"
- Released: 8 August 1994
- Genre: Pop; swingbeat
- Length: 4:30
- Label: Parlophone
- Songwriters: Ian Allen; David Keates; Gary Stevenson; Dave West
- Producer: Gary Stevenson

Sean Maguire singles chronology
"Someone to Love" (1994)	"Take This Time" (1994)

"Someone to Love" is a song by English actor and singer Sean Maguire, released as his first single in August 1994 by Parlophone. It was co-written and produced by Gary Stevenson and featured on the singer's debut album, Sean Maguire (1994), reaching number 14 on the UK Singles Chart. The single spent seven weeks within the chart.

== Critical reception ==
Pan-European magazine Music & Media stated, "With this catchy swingbeat single the Eastender has a flying start." Alan Jones from Music Week wrote, "The former EastEnders star turns in an acceptable performance on a mid-tempo chugger that is pleasant but unexceptional. Something of a heart throb, Maguire is to undertake a massive promotional tour in support, so expect this to chart." Mark Frith from Smash Hits gave "Someone to Love" a score of four out of five, saying, "First thing to say, he has a good little voice, our Sean. Second thing to say, he has a bit of a good tune too — not ground-breaking by any means, but a solid, good pop song that will surprise a lot of people. And if he's willing to take a few risks with his next few singles, his future could be very bright indeed."

== Track listing ==
1. "Someone to Love"
2. "Devotion"
3. "Someone to Love" (P's R&B dub)
4. "Someone to Love" (P's dub mix)

== Charts ==
=== Weekly charts ===
Chart (1994)	Peak position
Europe (Eurochart Hot 100)	46
UK Singles (OCC)	14
UK Airplay (Music Week)	15

=== Year-end charts ===
Chart (1994)	Position
UK Singles (OCC)	128

== Release history ==
Region	Date	Format(s)	Label(s)	Ref.
United Kingdom	8 August 1994	CD; cassette	Parlophone	
Australia	24 April 1995	CD	Parlophone	
