= You to Me Are Everything =

1976 single by the Real Thing

- CD compilation titled after the song

Single by The Real Thing

from the album Real Thing
- B-side: "Keep an Eye (on Your Best Friend)"
- Released: April 1976
- Genre: Disco; soul
- Length: 3:22
- Label: Pye Records
- Songwriters: Ken Gold; Michael Denne
- Producer: Ken Gold

The Real Thing singles chronology
"Stone Cold Love Affair" (1975)	"You to Me Are Everything" (1976)	"Can't Get By Without You" (1976)

"You to Me Are Everything" is a song by British soul group The Real Thing, released as a single in 1976. Written by Ken Gold and Michael Denne and produced by Gold, "You to Me Are Everything" was the Real Thing's sole number-one single on the UK Singles Chart, spending three weeks at the top in July 1976. The song was re-released ten years later titled the "Decade Remix" which returned the song to the chart in March 1986, reaching number five.

The song has been covered by a number of artists, including Sonia and Sean Maguire, whose versions also charted in the UK.

== Background ==
The Real Thing first appeared on the ITV talent show Opportunity Knocks, to which they then acquired a manager, Tony Hall who secured them a recording contract with Pye Records. For their 8th single, they recorded "You to Me Are Everything". The song was written by producer Ken Gold together with Micky Denne; Denne came up with the chorus first, and they wrote most of the song in less than an hour. They took the demo of the song to Hall and Chris Amoo, the lead singer of the Real Thing, and the group recorded the song at the Roundhouse studios a week later.

In the United States, two other versions of the song were released at the same time as the version by the Real Thing, by American groups Broadway and Revelation, whose versions were both released the same week, and at one point all three appeared on the Billboard Hot 100 and R&B charts. Although the version by the Real Thing outsold the other two versions, the confusion with the three different versions effectively prevented each other from becoming a hit in the US.

== Commercial performance ==
The original release of "You to Me Are Everything" reached number one in the UK and stayed there for three weeks. It peaked at No. 22 in Australia, number 3 in Ireland and number 10 in New Zealand. The original version has been certified platinum in the UK for 600,000 single sales.

The song was a minor hit in the US, peaking at number 64 on the Billboard Hot 100 singles chart and number 28 on the Billboard R&B chart.

In 1986, the Decade Remix by DJ Froggy, Simon Harris and KC was released by PRT Records. The remix reached No. 5 in the UK in March.

== Charts ==
=== Weekly charts ===
Original release

Chart (1976)	Peak position
Australia (Kent Music Report)	22
Belgium (Ultratop 50 Flanders)	8
Belgium (Ultratop 50 Wallonia)	29
Ireland (IRMA)	3
Netherlands (Dutch Top 40)	4
Netherlands (Single Top 100)	4
New Zealand (Recorded Music NZ)	10
Sweden (Sverigetopplistan)	16
UK Singles (Official Charts)	1
US Billboard Hot 100	64
West Germany (GfK)	36

The Decade Remix 76-86

Chart (1986)	Peak position
Austria (Ö3 Austria Top 40)	21
Belgium (Ultratop 50 Flanders)	21
Ireland (IRMA)	6
Netherlands (Dutch Top 40)	19
Netherlands (Single Top 100)	15
New Zealand (Recorded Music NZ)	2
UK Singles (Official Charts)	5
West Germany (GfK)	13

=== Year-end charts ===
Original release

Chart (1976)	Position
Belgium (Ultratop 50 Flanders)	66
Netherlands (Dutch Top 40)	44
Netherlands (Single Top 100)	36

The Decade Remix 76-86

Chart (1986)	Position
New Zealand (Recorded Music NZ)	12
UK Singles (OCC)	45
West Germany (Official German Charts)	68

== Certifications ==
Region	Certification	Certified units/sales
United Kingdom (BPI)	Platinum	600,000^{‡}
^{‡} Sales+streaming figures based on certification alone.

== Sonia version ==
"You to Me Are Everything"

Single by Sonia

from the album Sonia
- B-side: "Be My Baby"
- Released: 4 November 1991
- Length: 3:56 (album version); 3:26 (single version)
- Label: IQ
- Songwriters: Ken Gold; Michael Denne
- Producer: Nigel Wright

Sonia singles chronology
"Be Young, Be Foolish, Be Happy" (1991)	"You to Me Are Everything" (1991)	"We’ve Got the Power" (1992)

"You to Me Are Everything" was covered by English pop singer Sonia in 1991. The song was released in November 1991 by label IQ as the third and final single from her second album, Sonia (1991). The "Radio Mix" is a new remixed version by Pete Hammond that differs from the album version. The song's B-side, "Be My Baby", is also on the album. The single reached No. 13 in UK and No. 14 in Ireland.

=== Track listings ===
- CD single
1. "You to Me Are Everything" (Radio Mix) – 3:27
2. "You to Me Are Everything" (Extended Mix) – 6:07
3. "Be My Baby" – 3:54
- 7-inch single
1. "You to Me Are Everything" – 3:56
2. "Be My Baby" – 3:54
- 12-inch single
1. "You to Me Are Everything" (extended mix) – 6:07
2. "Be My Baby" – 3:54
3. "You to Me Are Everything" (radio mix) – 3:27

=== Charts ===
Chart (1991)	Peak position
Europe (Eurochart Hot 100)	43
Ireland (IRMA)	14
UK Singles (Official Charts)	13
UK Airplay (Music Week)	20

== Sean Maguire version ==
"You to Me Are Everything"

Single by Sean Maguire

from the album Spirit
- Released: 6 November 1995
- Genre: Soul
- Length: 3:44
- Label: Parlophone
- Songwriters: Ken Gold; Michael Denne
- Producer: Gary Stevenson

Sean Maguire singles chronology
"Now I've Found You" (1995)	"You to Me Are Everything" (1995)	"Good Day" (1996)

English actor and singer Sean Maguire covered "You to Me Are Everything" and released it in November 1995 by Parlophone as the second single from his second album, Spirit (1996). His version was produced by Gary Stevenson, reaching number 16 on the UK Singles Chart, and he performed it on Top of the Pops.

=== Critical reception ===
Gill Whyte from Smash Hits gave the cover version three out of five, writing, "Still, this is a top soul number: swoony, '60s groovy party noises, so even with Sean weedying his way through it, it still sounds pretty darn funky."

=== Track listings ===
- CD1
1. "You to Me Are Everything"
2. "You to Me Are Everything" (extended mix)
3. "You to Me Are Everything" (G-Mix extended)
4. "Suddenly" (extended mix)
- CD2
1. "You to Me Are Everything"
2. "Suddenly"
3. "Take This Time"
4. "Someone to Love"
- Cassette
1. "You to Me Are Everything"
2. "Lean on Me" (Bill Withers cover)

== Other versions ==
The song has been covered by Frankie Valli, whose version was released as the B-side to "We're All Alone" that reached No. 78 on the Billboard Hot 100. It has also been covered by Andy Abraham. Spanish singer Miguel Bosé sing a Spanish version entitled "Eres todo para mí" in his 1977 album "Linda". A Finnish version entitled "Ei enempää voi pyytää" ("He can ask no more") was recorded in 1978 by Petri Pettersson. Later on, in 1997, songwriter Marina Rei successfully recorded an Italian-language version, "Primavera" ("Spring").. The Song has also been covered by Malaysian artist Dayang Nurfaizah in 2007 which is sung in Bahasa Melayu and titled 'Cerita Cinta Dayang'.
