= Now I've Found You =

1995 single by Sean Maguire

Single by Sean Maguire

from the album Spirit
- B-side: "Once in a Lifetime"; "Lead Me by the Hand"
- Released: 12 June 1995
- Label: Parlophone
- Songwriter: Glyn Poole
- Producers: Mike Percy; Tim Lever

Sean Maguire singles chronology
"Suddenly" (1995)	"Now I've Found You" (1995)	"You to Me Are Everything" (1995)

CD2

"Now I've Found You" is a song by English-American actor and singer Sean Maguire, released as a single in June 1995, by Parlophone. Produced by Mike Percy and Tim Lever from Dead or Alive, it was the first single from Maguire's second album, Spirit, which was released a year later. "Now I've Found You" reached number 22 on the UK Singles Chart.

== Track listings ==
- CD1
1. "Now I've Found You"
2. "Once in a Lifetime"
3. "Now I've Found You" (extended mix)
4. "Now I've Found You" (Republica mix)
- CD2
1. "Now I've Found You"
2. "Lead Me by the Hand"
3. "Now I've Found You" (extended mix)
4. "Now I've Found You" (Republica dub)

== Charts ==
Chart (1995)	Peak Position
Scotland (OCC)	22
UK Singles (OCC)	22
UK Pop Tip Club Chart (Music Week)	6
