= Spirit (Sean Maguire album) =

Studio album by Sean Maguire
- Released: 3 June 1996
- Recorded: 1995–1996
- Genre: Pop
- Label: Parlophone

Sean Maguire chronology
Sean Maguire (1994)	Spirit (1996)	Greatest Hits (1998)

Singles from Spirit
- 1. "Now I've Found You" Released: 12 June 1995; 2. "You To Me Are Everything" Released: 6 November 1995; 3. "Good Day" Released: 13 May 1996; 4. "Don't Pull Your Love" Released: 22 July 1996

Spirit is the second studio album by English singer and actor Sean Maguire. It was released on 3 June 1996 by Parlophone Records.

== Background ==
Maguire spent most of 1995 and the beginning of 1996 recording the album while simultaneously juggling his acting career in Dangerfield.

== Singles ==
Four singles were released from the album: "Now I've Found You", "You To Me Are Everything", "Good Day", and "Don't Pull Your Love".

== Commercial performance ==
Spirit peaked at number forty-three on the UK Albums Chart.

== Critical reception ==
Professional ratings
Review scores
Source	Rating
AllMusic	3/5 stars
Smash Hits	4/5 stars

Spirit received generally mixed reviews from music critics.

== Track listing ==
No.	Title	Length
1.	"Good Day"
2.	"Treat Me"
3.	"You To Me Are Everything"
4.	"If You Really Cared"
5.	"I'll Be Good For You"
6.	"If I Surrender"
7.	"Now I've Found You"
8.	"Your Love"
9.	"Don't Pull Your Love"
10.	"Sweet Town (Mister Cab Driver)"
11.	"Where Do Broken Hearts Go"
12.	"Make It Right"

== Chart positions ==
Chart (1996)	Position
UK Albums Chart	43
