= Golden Power Group =

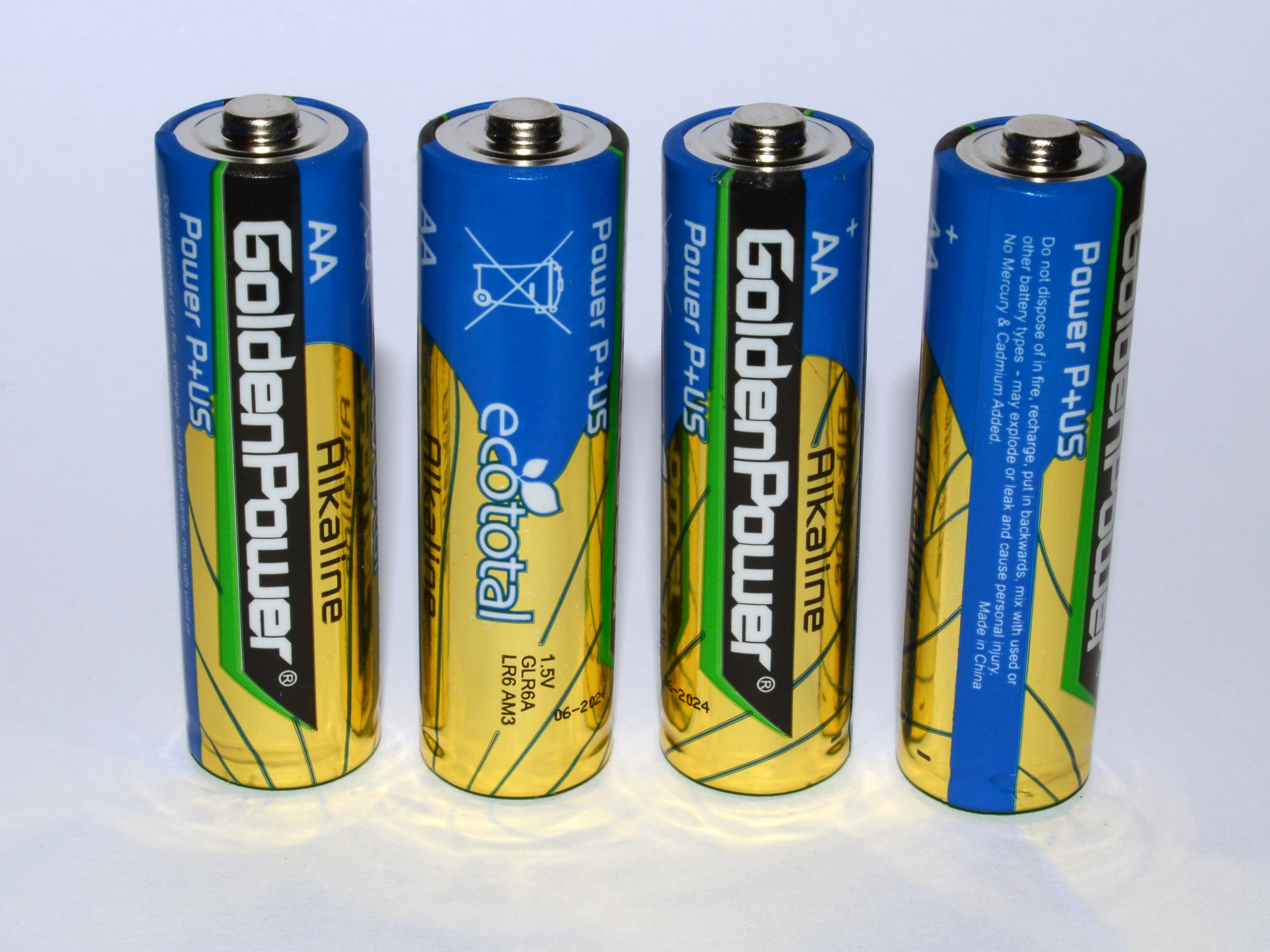
- Four Golden Power AA alkaline batteries
- Formerly: Golden Power Industrial Limited
- Company type: Listed Company
- Traded as: SEHK: 3919
- Industry: Alkaline Battery Carbon Battery; Alkaline Button Cell; Silver Zinc Battery; Lithium Battery; Zinc-air Battery; Rechargeable Battery Charger
- Founded: 1972
- Headquarters: Hong Kong
- Website: http://www.goldenpower.com

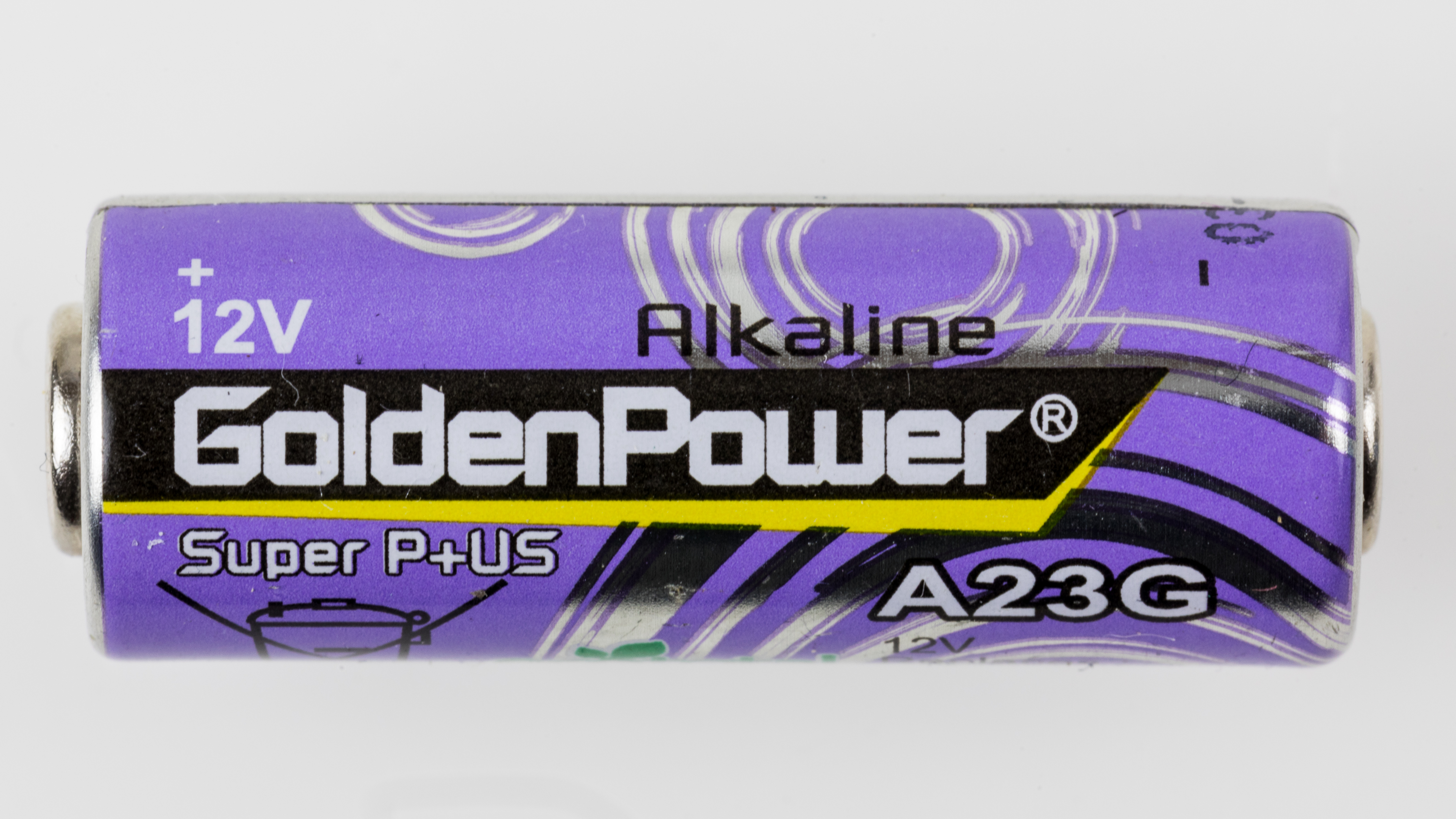
Golden Power 12v battery

Golden Power Group, also known as Golden Power Group Holdings Limited (Chinese: 金力集團, HKEX: 8038), was established in 1972 in Hong Kong and was previously named as Golden Power Industrial Limited. In January 2016, the total assets of this company reached HKD 150 million.

== Company History ==
Golden Power Group is mainly based in Hong Kong and China, focusing on manufacturing, designing and selling diverse types of batteries for the use of electronic products (B to B) and retail sales (B to C).

This company was on list in HKEX on 28 May 1993, and was named "Golden Power International Limited" (Before China Oil & Gas Group Company). In 2000, Hikari Tsushin Investments Management (HK) Limited acquired and placed the company under trusteeship. Golden Power was on list again on Growth Enterprise Market on 5 June 2015 and issued 56 million stock, with placing price around HKD 1.25-1.35, raising a total of HKD 75.6 million.

== Main Business ==
Golden Power mainly provides batteries and related products. The list of products is as below:

- Alkaline Battery
- Carbon Battery
- Alkaline button cell
- Silver Zinc Battery
- Lithium Battery
- Zinc–air battery
- Rechargeable Battery
- Charger
