= Greatest Hits (Sean Maguire album) =

Compilation album by Sean Maguire
- Released: 18 June 1998
- Recorded: 1993–1997
- Genre: Pop
- Label: EMI Gold

Sean Maguire chronology
Spirit (1996)	Greatest Hits (1998)

Greatest Hits is a compilation album by Sean Maguire. It was released by EMI Gold in 1998 just over a year after Sean had announced he was leaving the music industry to concentrate on acting. No new songs were on the album and it was released with no promotion. The album featured seven of his eight singles, some B-sides, album tracks and re-mixes. This is the only Sean Maguire compilation to date.

AllMusic rated it three stars and noted, "The greatest-hits album was released so prematurely that it nearly screamed 'finalized singing career'."

== Track listing ==
No.	Title	Length
1.	"Good Day"
2.	"Someone To Love"
3.	"You To Me Are Everything"
4.	"Take This Time"
5.	"Suddenly"
6.	"Now I've Found You"
7.	"Don't Pull Your Love"
8.	"Lean On Me"
9.	"Love By Candlelight"
10.	"The Sun Shines From You"
11.	"I'm The One For You"
12.	"Count On Me"
13.	"Party Zone"
14.	"Stay"
15.	"Devotion"
16.	"Good Day" (Motiv 8 Southside Dub)
17.	"You To Me Are Everything" (Extended Re-Mix)
