= Alex Hardcastle =

British television director and producer

- Born: 19 November 1972 (age 53); Berkshire, England
- Occupations: Television director, producer
- Years active: 1995–present

Alex Hardcastle (born 19 November 1972) is a British television director and producer who has worked on television shows and movies in both the UK and the United States. He is best known for his directorial work on the American comedies New Girl, The Mindy Project, The Office, Grace & Frankie, Parks and Recreation as well as his series A Young Doctor's Notebook starring Jon Hamm and Daniel Radcliffe.

Hardcastle directed multiple episodes of the musical comedy Crazy Ex-Girlfriend for the CW, Grace & Frankie for Netflix and the comedy drama You're the Worst for FX. He directed the Warner Brothers / Paramount Network period drama American Woman starring Alicia Silverstone, Mena Suvari and Cheyenne Jackson, as well as multiple episodes of the Robin Williams show The Crazy Ones.

== Career ==
Hardcastle began his career during the mid-nineties producing British television documentaries such as In Search of James Bond with Jonathan Ross, as well as entertainment specials with Elton John, The Spice Girls and Rod Stewart; BBC1's Fame Academy; Comic Aid starring Simon Pegg, Dawn French, The League of Gentlemen and Eddie Izzard; Comic Relief; and Live at the Apollo. He produced Lee Evans XL, as well as Lee Mack Live, Dara O Briain: Live at the Theatre Royal and Jack Dee Live Again.

He turned to directing in the 2000s with series including the BBC2 sitcom Lead Balloon starring Jack Dee, School of Comedy (Channel 4) and BBC1's Not Going Out, the UK's longest running audience sitcom of all time. In 2012, he directed the first series of A Young Doctor's Notebook.

He has also directed episodes of American comedy series such as The Office, Parks and Recreation, The Crazy Ones, Super Fun Night, Running Wilde, Suburgatory, The Middle, The Mindy Project, Trophy Wife, How to Live with Your Parents for the Rest of Your Life, Kröd Mändoon and the Flaming Sword of Fire, the Christian Slater action comedy Breaking In, and the David Cross and Will Arnett comedy The Increasingly Poor Decisions of Todd Margaret.

In 2018, Hardcastle directed The Good Cop for Netflix starring Josh Groban and Tony Danza in New York, as well as multiple episodes of Grace and Frankie. He produced the final 15 episodes of the series starring Jane Fonda, Lily Tomlin, Sam Waterston and Martin Sheen.

In 2022, Hardcastle made his feature film directing debut with the Netflix original film Senior Year, starring Rebel Wilson.

Hardcastle lives in Los Angeles, California.
