= India de Beaufort =

British actress (born 1987)

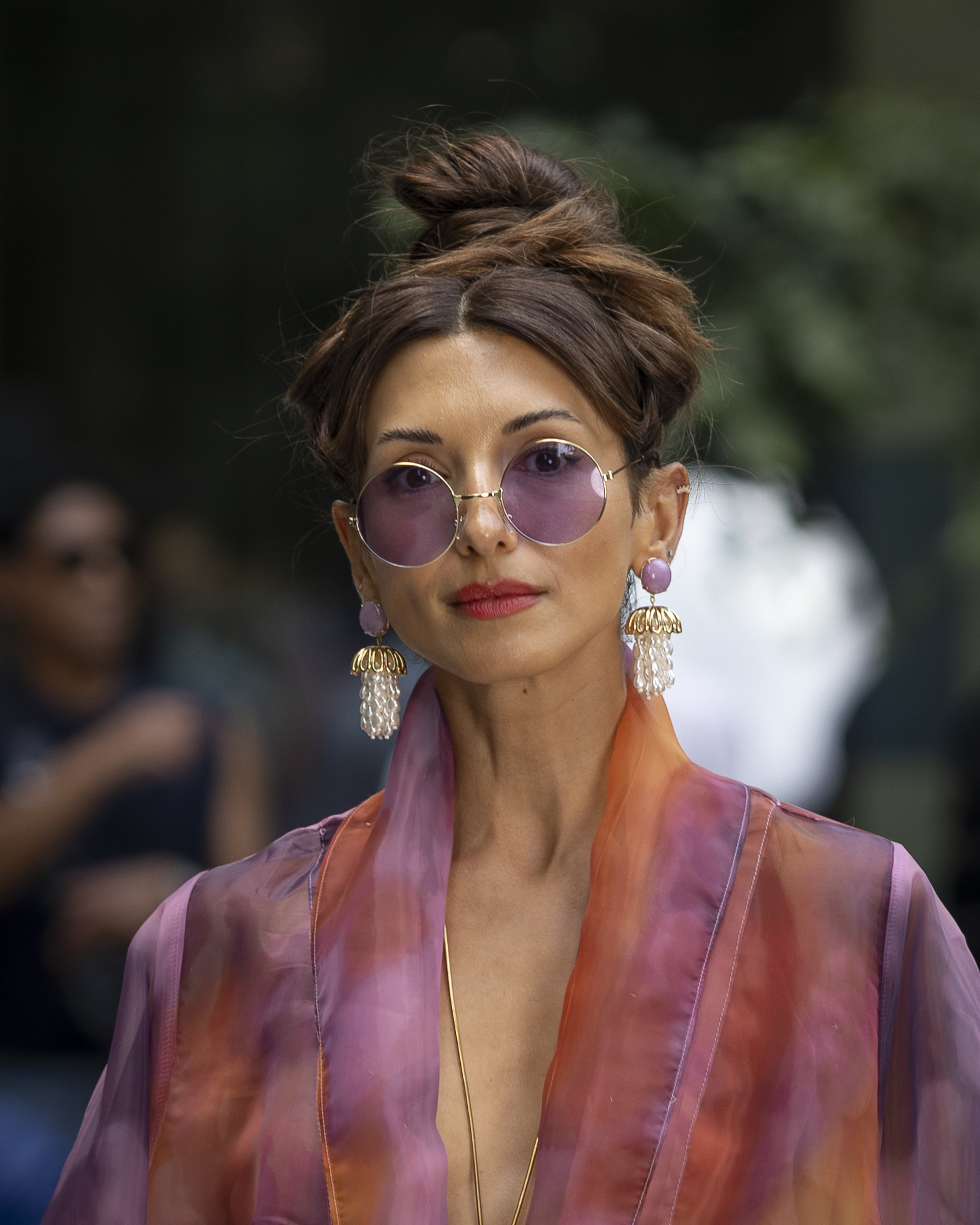
- de Beaufort in 2025
- Born: India Ewence Beaufort Lloyd; 27 June 1987 (age 39); Kingston upon Thames, London, England
- Other name: India Beau
- Occupation: Actress
- Years active: 1996–present
- Spouse: Todd Grinnell (m. 2015)
- Children: 1
- Mother: Karen de Beaufort

India de Beaufort (born India Ewence Beaufort Lloyd; 27 June 1987) is a British actress. She began her career as a child actress in the CBBC series The Basil Brush Show (2003–2005). She went on to star in the BBC Two comedy Kröd Mändoon and the Flaming Sword of Fire (2009), the ABC series Jane by Design (2012), Blood & Oil (2015) and Kevin (Probably) Saves the World (2017–2018), and the NBC series Night Court (2023−2024). She also had a recurring role in the CW series One Tree Hill (2009–2010). Her films include The Better Half (2015) and Kimi (2022).

== Early life ==
India Ewence Beaufort Lloyd was born to Karen de Beaufort, an actress and dancer, and Nicholas O Ewence Lloyd and grew up in Surbiton, an area of outer South West London. She is of British and Indian background. Her maternal grandfather was born in Calcutta, where his family lived for around 350 years. She has stated that Beaufort comes from distant French ancestry.

De Beaufort attended Esher College in Surrey.

== Career ==
In 1994, de Beaufort appeared in a music video, "Every Woman Knows", for the artist Lulu, and in 1996 had a brief appearance as an orphan child in an episode of Penelope Keith's Next of Kin.

In 2002, aged 15, de Beaufort signed to Entertainment Rights as a singer-songwriter and actress. In the same year, she was cast as a principal character in the BAFTA nominated The Basil Brush Show as India Beau. De Beaufort went on to shoot three seasons with the show and performed as a featured artist on the Christmas single "Boom Boom, It's Basil Brush". The song remained on the UK Singles Chart for two weeks at position 44. During de Beaufort's time with the cast of the CBBC sitcom, she performed at Proms in the Park and took part in a nationwide tour.

In 2006, de Beaufort was cast as Maya in Simon Pegg's Run Fatboy Run, directed by David Schwimmer. She has said that this production switched her path from singer to actress. In 2008, de Beaufort was cast in her first adult starring television role as the pagan warrior Aneka in BBC Two and Comedy Central parody series Kröd Mändoon and the Flaming Sword of Fire.

In 2009, de Beaufort joined the cast of The CW teen drama One Tree Hill as Miranda Stone for its seventh season.

From 2010 to 2012, de Beaufort starred as India Jourdain in the ABC Family comedy-drama Jane by Design. She later had the recurring roles in Necessary Roughness and Chicago P.D. She also guest starred in the series Chuck, How I Met Your Mother, Castle and The Night Shift. From 2014 to 2017, de Beaufort did her first voice role as Clover in the Netflix show All Hail King Julien.

In 2015, de Beaufort was cast as Jules Jackman in the ABC soap opera Blood & Oil. In 2016, de Beaufort was cast in recurring roles in the TV Land comedy-drama Younger as Radha and NCIS: Los Angeles as Alexandra Reynolds. She also guest starred in 2 Broke Girls. In 2017, de Beaufort joined the recurring cast of the HBO political satire Veep for its sixth and seventh seasons as Brie Ramachandran. She was also cast in the ABC pilot The Gospel of Kevin, later changed to Kevin (Probably) Saves the World; it was picked up into a series and premiered on 3 October 2017. From 2019 to 2020, she appeared in 7 episodes of the Netflix and Pop TV sitcom One Day at a Time as her real-life husband Todd Grinnell's onscreen girlfriend Avery.

From 2023 to 2024, de Beaufort starred as assistant district attorney Olivia Moore in the Night Court revival series on NBC.

== Personal life ==
On 29 August 2015, de Beaufort married actor Todd Grinnell. They have a son who was born in 2018. In March 2021, de Beaufort announced that she became an American citizen in 2020.

== Filmography ==
=== Film ===
Year	Title	Role	Notes
2007	Run Fatboy Run	Maya Goshdashtidar	
2015	The Better Half	Dina	
2022	Kimi	Sharon	
2022	Slumberland	Ms. Arya	
TBA	Dog People	Angie	Short film

=== Television ===
Year	Title	Role	Notes
1996	Next of Kin	Deprived Youngster	Episode: "The Theme Park"; uncredited role
1997	Teletubbies	Herself in the TV event	Video: Dance with the Teletubbies
2003–2005	The Basil Brush Show	India	Recurring role, 20 episodes
2009	Kröd Mändoon and the Flaming Sword of Fire	Aneka	6 episodes
2009–2010	One Tree Hill	Miranda Stone	Recurring role, 12 episodes
2011	Chuck	Jasmine	Episode: "Chuck Versus Agent X"
2012	Jane by Design	India Jourdain	Main role, 18 episodes
2013	Necessary Roughness	India	3 episodes
2013	How I Met Your Mother	Sophia	Episode: "Knight Vision"; credited as India De Beaufort
2014	Chicago P.D.	Layla Roslyn	3 episodes
2014–2017	All Hail King Julien	Clover; Crimson; Grandma Rose; Lover Bot	Main voice role
2015	Castle	Taylor McKinley	Episode: "I, Witness"
2015	The Night Shift	Farrah	Episode: "Darkest Before Dawn"
2015	Blood & Oil	Jules Jackman	Series regular, 10 episodes
2016	Younger	Radha	Recurring role; 4 episodes
2017	2 Broke Girls	Winnona Williams	Episode: "And the Himmicane"
2017	All Hail King Julien: Exiled	Clover; Crimson; Hansmerelda	Main voice role
2016–2019	NCIS: Los Angeles	Alexandra Reynolds	4 episodes
2017–2018	Kevin (Probably) Saves the World	Kristin Allen	Main role
2017–2019	Veep	Brie Ramachandran	6 episodes
2018	The New Looney Tunes	Foxy Foxworth	Voice, Episode: "Undercover Bunny"
2019–2020	One Day at a Time	Avery	Recurring role; 7 episodes
2019	Modern Family	Dr. Singh	Episode: "A Moving Day"
2020–2022	It's Pony	Helen Bramley; Mom; Stag's Head; Old Woman	Recurring role, voice; 24 episodes
2020	Zoey's Extraordinary Playlist	Jessica	Recurring role; 5 episodes
2021	Fast & Furious Spy Racers	Dann	Voice; 7 episodes
2022	Firefly Lane	Charlie	Recurring role; 4 episodes
2022	Kamp Koral: SpongeBob's Under Years	Maisey Manes	Voice; episode: "Camp Spirit"
2023–2024	Night Court	Olivia Moore	Main cast
2024	SpongeBob SquarePants	Maisey Manes	Voice; episode: "Kreepaway Kamp"
2024–2026	Max & the Midknights	Fendra	Main voice role
2026	Eternally Yours	Celeste	Episode: "The Mistake"

=== Video games ===
Year	Title	Voice role
2015	Infinite Crisis	Arcane Supergirl
