= Sean Maguire =

English actor (born 1976)

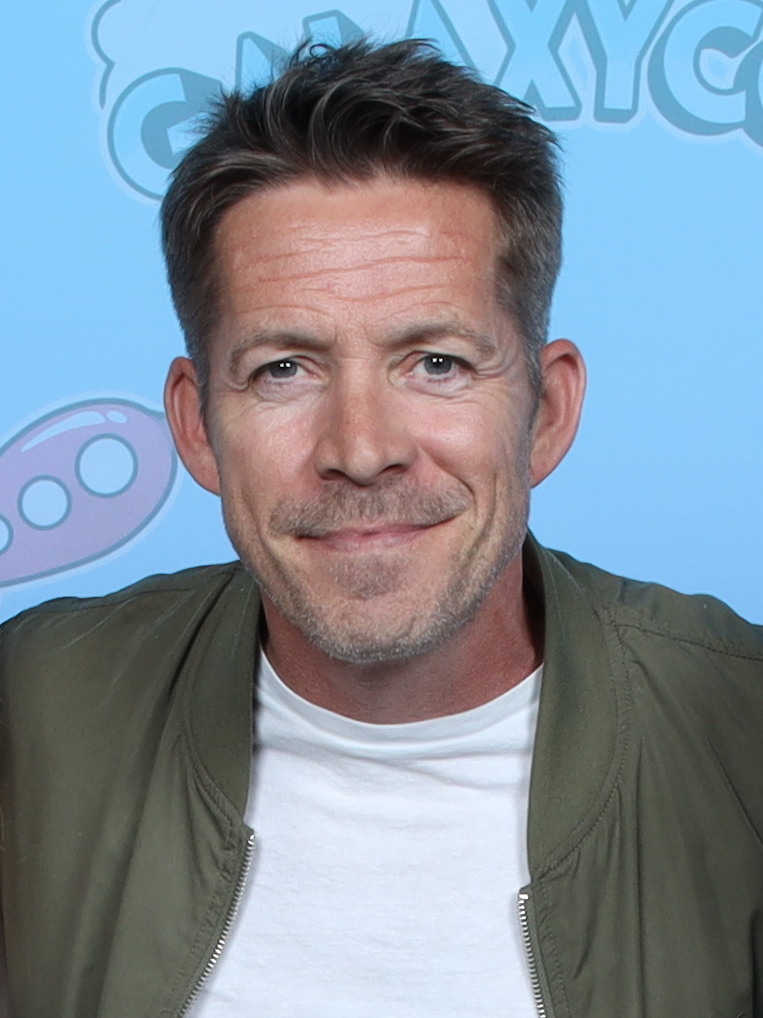
- Maguire at GalaxyCon Oklahoma City in 2024
- Born: 18 April 1976 (age 50); Ilford, London, England
- Occupations: Actor; singer
- Years active: 1981–present
- Spouse: Tanya Flynn (m. 2012)
- Children: 3

Sean Maguire (born 18 April 1976) is an English-American actor and singer who has been professionally making films, television shows and performing on stage for over 40 years. Originally from London, Maguire started his career at age five starring alongside Laurence Olivier in A Voyage Round My Father. He then rose to fame at age ten when he was cast in the BBC drama Grange Hill in the role of "Tegs" Ratcliffe in which he remained until 1991. After leaving Grange Hill, Maguire played Aidan Brosnan in EastEnders.

Maguire has appeared in several feature films and had success as a singer. He is known in the United States for his roles as Donovan Brink on the UPN sitcom Eve, and as Kyle Lendo in the CBS sitcom The Class. Maguire appeared with Suranne Jones in Scott & Bailey as P.C. Sean McCartney, and he played Robin Hood in ABC's Once Upon a Time He also starred in The Magicians on Syfy, The 100 on The CW, NBC’s Timeless as Ian Fleming, in The 7.39 playing Ryan alongside Olivia Colman, in the Snapchat series Action Royale and in the science fiction podcast series Electric Easy. In 2023, he appeared on the CBS hit show S.W.A.T., playing Joe.

== Career ==
At the age of seven, Maguire played one of the many children in the "Every Sperm is Sacred" musical number in the 1983 film Monty Python's The Meaning of Life. In 1991, he played Simon in the BBC children's drama Dodgem. In 1993, Maguire joined the cast of the British soap opera EastEnders playing Aidan Brosnan, a young Irish footballer playing for fictional side Walford F.C. In 1994, he left the show to take a starring role in the BBC drama series Dangerfield, playing Marty Dangerfield. He has also appeared in Holby City and Sunburn. Maguire then pursued a career in music, releasing three albums: his self-titled debut album in 1994, Spirit in 1996, and Greatest Hits in 1998. Maguire's biggest hit was Good Day, which reached number 12 in May 1996. During this time, Maguire appeared on the Childliners record The Gift of Christmas with acts such as the Backstreet Boys, E.Y.C., MN8, Deuce, Ultimate Kaos, Let Loose, East 17, Peter Andre, Michelle Gayle, Dannii Minogue and many more. Maguire announced his retirement from the music industry during his final performance at Maesteg Town Hall, part of his Chick N Bay 9T5 4EVA tour. Emotional scenes were witnessed in the audience as Sean launched into his final song, "Gone and Long Forgotten". Maguire has branched out into films: in the early 1990s, he appeared in Waterland opposite Ethan Hawke and Jeremy Irons.

In 2001, Maguire played the title role in the TV-film Prince Charming opposite Bernadette Peters, Christina Applegate and Billy Connolly – with Martin Short as his assistant, Rodney. In 2005, he also made The Third Wish – which co-starred actors Jenna Mattison, Armand Assante, Betty White and James Avery. Maguire also appeared as Euan in the defunct WB Network sitcom Off Centre with Eddie Kaye Thomas and Jason George.

Maguire (alongside Jason George once again) played one of the main characters, Donovan Brink, on the television series Eve. He starred in the CBS sitcom The Class, playing gay character Kyle Lendo, but the show was cancelled in May 2007. He completed filming in 2006–2007 for an American comedy film LA Blues playing a character called Jack Davis.

Maguire's film Meet the Spartans went to No. 1 in the US box office chart in 2008, and he starred in Mr Eleven on ITV1 in autumn 2008. Maguire also signed on to a guest spot in Cupid for ABC portraying an Irish musician.

Maguire played the lead role in Kröd Mändoon and the Flaming Sword of Fire, a comedy fantasy series in which he plays a "sensitive, but clueless freedom fighter". The show premiered in the United States on Comedy Central on 9 April 2009, in Canada on Citytv on 8 June, and in the United Kingdom on BBC Two on 11 June.

In the third season of ABC's Once Upon a Time, Maguire joined the show as Robin Hood, taking over the role from Tom Ellis. After recurring for two seasons, he was promoted to a series regular in June 2015, right before the start of the show's fifth season.

In 2023, Maguire appeared in the sixth season of CBS's S.W.A.T alongside Shemar Moore, playing Joe.

== Personal life ==
Maguire is one of six siblings from the famous Irish dance family. His parents run the well-known Maguire–O'Shea school. Maguire himself danced competitively as a child. Maguire married police detective Tanya Flynn on 19 October 2012. They held a second wedding on 30 December 2014. The couple's first child, a son, was born in July 2015. Their second son was born in December 2017. Their third child, a daughter, was born in September 2021.

Along with his wife, Maguire became a naturalised citizen of the United States on 23 September 2020.

== Filmography ==
=== Film ===
Year	Title	Role	Notes
1983	Monty Python's The Meaning of Life	N/A	Uncredited
1992	Waterland	Peter	
2000	Out of Depth	Paul Nixon	
2005	The Third Wish	Brandon	
2007	L.A. Blues	Jack Davis	
2007	The Dukes	Dave	
2008	Meet the Spartans	Leonidas	
2012	Songs for Amy	Sean O'Malley	
2022	V for Vengeance	Thorn	
2023	A Snowy Day in Oakland	Grant	

=== Television ===
Year	show	Role	Notes
1988–1991	Grange Hill	Terence 'Tegs' Ratcliffe	Main role
1991	Dodgem	Simon Leighton	Television miniseries
1992	Growing Pains	Jason Begley	Recurring role (series 1)
1993	The Bill	Darren Hancock	Episode: "A Better Life"
1993	EastEnders	Aidan Brosnan	Regular role
1995	Dangerfield	Marty Dangerfield	Main role (series 1–2)
1997	Scene	Alan	Episode: "A Man of Letters"
1997	Dear Nobody	Chris Marshall	Television film
1999	Holby City	Darren Ingram	Episodes: "Staying Alive (Parts 1 & 2)" (season 1)
2000	Sunburn	Lee Wilson	Main role (series 2)
2000	Urban Gothic	Jude Redfield	Episode: "Thirteen"
2001	Prince Charming	Prince 'Charming' John	Television film
2001–2002	Off Centre	Euan Pierce	Main role
2003–2006	Eve	Donovan Brink	Main role
2006–2007	The Class	Kyle Lendo	Main role
2009	Cupid	Dave	Episode: Pilot
2009	Kröd Mändoon and the Flaming Sword of Fire	Kröd Mändoon	Television miniseries
2009	Mister Eleven	Dan	2-part television film
2010	Cold Case	Phil	Episode: "Two Weddings"
2010	CSI: NY	Alex Brodevesky	Episode: "The 34th Floor"
2010	Undercovers	Clive	Episode: "Xerxes"
2011	Bedlam	Sean	Episodes: "Driven", "Inmates", "Hide and Seek"
2011	71 Degrees North	Himself	Contestant (series 2)
2011, 2024	Death in Paradise	Marlon Collins	Episodes: "Arriving in Paradise", "Going Round in Circles"
2011	Lovelives	Blake	Television film
2012–2013	Scott & Bailey	PC Sean McCartney	Also starring (series 2–3)
2013	Criminal Minds	Thane Parks	Episode: "Brothers Hotchner"
2013	Once Upon a Time in Wonderland	Robin Hood	Episode: "Forget Me Not"
2013–2018	Once Upon a Time	Robin Hood	Recurring role (seasons 3–4, 6); main role (season 5); guest role (season 7); 56 episodes
2014	The 7.39	Ryan Cole	2-part television film
2015	The Red Dress	James	Television film
2016	Timeless	Ian Fleming	Episode: "Party at Castle Varlar"
2019–2020	The 100	Russell Lightbourne	Episodes: "Red Sun Rising", "The Gospel of Josephine", "From the Ashes"
2020	The Magicians	Sir Effingham / The Dark King	10 episodes
2021	Electric Easy	Rizz / Driver	4 Episodes; "Verse Two: In the Crosshairs", "Verse Five: Nirvana", "Verse Six: At War", "Verse Seven: Cats and Dogs"
2021	Action Royale		6 Episodes
2022	S.W.A.T.	Joe	Episodes: "Thai Hard", "Thai Another Day"

=== Video games ===
Year	Game	Role
2014	Forza Horizon 2	Ben Miller

== Discography ==
=== Albums ===
Year	Information	UK Album Chart
1994	Sean Maguire: Debut studio album; Released: 14 November 1994; Formats: CD, Cassette	75
1996	Spirit: Second studio album; Released: 3 June 1996; Formats: CD, Cassette	43
1998	Greatest Hits: Compilation album; Released: 18 June 1998; Formats: CD, Cassette	—

=== Singles ===
Year	Single	UK Singles Chart	Album
1994	"Someone to Love"	14	Sean Maguire
1994	"Take This Time"	27	Sean Maguire
1995	"Suddenly"	18	Sean Maguire
1995	"Now I've Found You"	22	Spirit
1995	"You to Me Are Everything"	16	Spirit
1996	"Good Day"	12	Spirit
1996	"Don't Pull Your Love"	14	Spirit
1997	"Today's the Day"	27	Non-album single

== Stage work ==
- Romeo and Juliet
- Loot
- Funny About Love

== Bibliography ==
- James, Bethan (2012) Someone to Love? (3rd ed). Bridgend: MadMike Publishers UK. p. 69
