= Five Star discography =

- Studio albums: 8
- Compilation albums: 3
- Singles: 32
- Music videos: 26

Discography of Five Star (also styled as 5 Star), a British pop/R&B group formed in 1983.

Between 1985 and 1988, Five Star had four top 20 albums and 16 Top 40 singles in the UK, including top 10 hits "System Addict", "Can't Wait Another Minute", "Find the Time", and "Rain or Shine". The group have additionally had two studio albums and four singles chart in the US while also scoring chart success across Europe and in New Zealand.

== Albums ==
=== Studio albums ===
Title	Album details	Peak chart positions									Certifications
Title	Album details	UK	AUS	GER	NED	NZ	SWE	SWI	US	US R&B	Certifications
Luxury of Life	Released: 22 July 1985; Label: RCA/Tent	12	—	—	25	24	—	—	57	14	BPI: Platinum
Silk & Steel	Released: 18 August 1986; Label: RCA/Tent	1	79	51	24	30	28	17	80	22	BPI: 4× Platinum
Between the Lines	Released: 14 September 1987; Label: RCA/Tent	7	—	—	22	35	16	27	—	—	BPI: Platinum
Rock the World	Released: 15 August 1988; Label: RCA/Tent	17	—	—	54	—	28	—	—	91	BPI: Silver
Five Star	Released: 1 August 1990; Label: Epic/Tent	—	—	—	—	—	—	—	—	—	
Shine	Released: 10 December 1991; Label: Epic	—	—	—	—	—	—	—	—	—	
Heart and Soul	Released: 7 August 1995; Label: Tent	—	—	—	—	—	—	—	—	—	
Eclipse	Released: 12 June 2001; Label: Tent	—	—	—	—	—	—	—	—	—	
"—" denotes items that did not chart or were not released in that territory.

=== Compilation albums ===
Title	Album details	Peak chart positions
Title	Album details	UK
Greatest Hits	Released: 9 October 1989; Label: RCA/Tent	53
The Greatest Hits	Released: April 2003; Label: BMG	—
The Remix Anthology The Remixes 1984–1991	Released: 2013; Label: Cherry Pop	—
Gold	Released: 4 October 2019; Label: Demon Records	43
"—" denotes items that did not chart or were not released in that territory.

== Singles ==
Year	Title	Peak chart positions										Certifications	Album
Year	Title	UK	BEL	GER	IRE	NED	NZ	SWI	US	US Dance	US R&B	Certifications	Album
1983	"Problematic"	—	—	—	—	—	—	—	—	—	—		Non-album single
1984	"Hide and Seek"	113	—	—	—	—	—	—	—	—	—		Luxury of Life
1984	"Crazy"	144	—	—	—	—	—	—	—	—	—		Luxury of Life
1985	"All Fall Down"	15	13	—	21	6	46	—	65	6	16		Luxury of Life
1985	"Let Me Be the One"	18	30	—	21	11	—	—	59	9	2		Luxury of Life
1985	"Love Take Over"	25	—	—	—	34	—	—	—	30	9		Luxury of Life
1985	"R.S.V.P."	45	—	—	—	—	—	—	—	—	—		Luxury of Life
1986	"System Addict"	3	24	19	8	—	25	7	—	—	—	BPI: Silver	Luxury of Life
1986	"Can't Wait Another Minute"	7	—	29	5	—	43	16	41	5	7		Silk & Steel
1986	"Find the Time"	7	32	42	4	27	32	14	—	—	—		Silk & Steel
1986	"Rain or Shine"	2	19	—	5	18	28	—	—	—	—	BPI: Silver	Silk & Steel
1986	"If I Say Yes"	15	29	—	9	—	—	—	67	26	13		Silk & Steel
1987	"Stay Out of My Life"	9	—	—	5	—	—	—	—	—	—		Silk & Steel
1987	"The Slightest Touch"	4	—	—	2	20	—	—	—	—	—		Silk & Steel
1987	"Are You Man Enough"	—	—	—	—	—	—	—	—	—	15		Silk & Steel
1987	"Whenever You're Ready"	11	31	—	2	22	—	23	—	—	39		Between the Lines
1987	"Strong as Steel"	16	—	—	9	100	—	—	—	—	—		Between the Lines
1987	"Somewhere Somebody"	23	—	—	18	35	—	—	—	—	—		Between the Lines
1988	"Another Weekend"	18	—	—	12	24	—	—	—	—	23		Rock the World
1988	"Rock My World"	28	—	—	21	86	—	—	—	—	—		Rock the World
1988	"Someone's in Love"	—	—	—	—	—	—	—	—	—	36		Rock the World
1988	"There's a Brand New World"	61	—	—	—	—	—	—	—	—	—		Rock the World
1988	"Let Me Be Yours"	51	—	—	—	—	—	—	—	—	—		Rock the World
1989	"With Every Heartbeat"	49	—	—	—	—	—	—	—	—	—		Greatest Hits
1990	"Treat Me Like a Lady"	54	—	—	—	—	—	—	—	—	—		Five Star
1990	"Hot Love"	68	—	—	—	—	—	—	—	—	—		Five Star
1991	"Shine"	88	—	—	—	—	—	—	—	—	—		Shine
1995	"(I Love You) For Sentimental Reasons"	84	—	—	—	—	—	—	—	—	116		Heart and Soul
1995	"I Give You Give"	83	—	—	—	—	—	—	—	—	—		Heart and Soul
1995	"Surely"	—	—	—	—	—	—	—	—	—	125		Heart and Soul
2001	"Funktafied"	—	—	—	—	—	—	—	—	—	99		Eclipse
2005	"System Addict 2005"	180	—	—	—	—	—	—	—	—	—		Non-album single
2020	"Let Me Be the 1" (Viision featuring Five Star)	—	—	—	—	—	—	—	—	—	—		Non-album single
"—" denotes items that did not chart or were not released in that territory.

== Music videos ==
Year	Title	Director
1984	"Hide & Seek"	Michael Geoghegan
1984	"Crazy"	Michael Geoghegan
1985	"All Fall Down"	Christopher Robin Collins
1985	"Let Me Be the One"	Christopher Robin Collins
1985	"Love Take Over"	Sebastian Harris
1985	"R.S.V.P."	Sebastian Harris
1985	"System Addict"	Sebastian Harris
1986	"Can't Wait Another Minute"	Chris Gabrin
1986	"Find the Time"	Christopher Robin Collins
1986	"Rain or Shine"	Christopher Robin Collins
1986	"If I Say Yes"	Brian Ward
1987	"Stay Out of My Life"	Christopher Robin Collins
1987	"The Slightest Touch"	Dominic Orlando
1987	"Whenever You're Ready"	Christopher Robin Collins
1987	"Strong as Steel"	Christopher Robin Collins
1988	"Another Weekend"	Geoff Wonfor
1988	"Rock My World"	Geoff Wonfor
1988	"There's a Brand New World"	Neil MacKenzie Matthews
1988	"Let Me Be Yours"	Neil MacKenzie Matthews
1989	"With Every Heartbeat"	Geoff Wonfor
1990	"Treat Me Like a Lady"	Brian Grant
1990	"Hot Love"	Steve Graham
1991	"Shine"	Dan O'Dowd
1994	"(I Love You) For Sentimental Reasons"	Malcolm Jamal Warner
1995	"I Give You Give"	
2005	"System Addict 2005"	

== Videos and DVDs ==
Year	Title
1986	Luxury of Life - Video Selection (UK #3)
1987	Silk and Steel (UK #2)
1987	Between the Lines (Live at Wembley – Children of the Night Tour 1987) (UK #4)
1989	Greatest Hits
2007	Five Star Performance (UK #25)
