= The Greatest Hits (Five Star album) =

Greatest hits album by Five Star
- Released: 5 April 2003
- Recorded: 1985–1989
- Label: BMG

Five Star chronology
Eclipse (2001)	The Greatest Hits (2003)	The Remix Anthology (2013)

The Greatest Hits is the second compilation album by British pop group Five Star, released in 2003.

Although released 14 years after their previous compilation Greatest Hits, this album covers the same period of 1985 to 1989 and includes all of Five Star's UK Top 50 hit singles. Also included is the 1988 single "There's a Brand New World", which peaked at number 61, in place of the non-album bonus track "Something About My Baby" that had appeared on the previous Greatest Hits.

Certified Silver by BPI 8th September 2017 for sales exceeding 60,000 copies

Following the untimely passing of Stedman Pearson, The Greatest Hits debuted on The Official Album Download Chart at No.89 week ending 28th March 2025.

== Track listing ==
1. "System Addict"
2. "Rain or Shine"
3. "Can't Wait Another Minute"
4. "The Slightest Touch"
5. "Strong as Steel"
6. "Love Take Over"
7. "Find the Time"
8. "Let Me Be the One"
9. "If I Say Yes"
10. "Stay Out of My Life"
11. "All Fall Down"
12. "Whenever You're Ready"
13. "R.S.V.P."
14. "Somewhere Somebody"
15. "Another Weekend"
16. "Rock My World"
17. "With Every Heartbeat"
18. "There's a Brand New World"
