= Greatest Hits (Five Star album) =

1989 compilation album by Five Star

Greatest hits album by Five Star
- Released: 9 October 1989
- Recorded: 1984–89
- Genre: Pop
- Length: 71:51
- Labels: RCA/BMG, Tent
- Producer: Buster Pearson

Five Star chronology
Rock the World (1988)	Greatest Hits (1989)	Five Star (1990)

Singles from Greatest Hits
- 1. "With Every Heartbeat" Released: March 1989

Greatest Hits is a compilation album by the British pop group Five Star released in 1989. It was the group's first 'greatest hits' collection after a run of successful singles and albums since 1985. It contains all of the band's UK Top 50 singles including the non-album single, "With Every Heartbeat", which was released earlier in the year (although that track was not included on the LP version). Another new track, "Something About My Baby", was included on the CD and cassette versions of the album but was not released as a single. This track was composed by David Gamson of the synthpop trio Scritti Politti.

The release of Greatest Hits marked the end of the group's association with RCA Records. However, the album proved to be Five Star's least successful release up to that point, selling only 15,500 copies and peaking at a lowly No. 53 on the UK Albums Chart, highlighting the band's rapid decline in popularity.

After the release of Greatest Hits, the group signed to Epic Records and immediately began planning a new album for the following year, the Five Star album. However, this new album was not released in the UK.

== Track listing ==
1. "Can't Wait Another Minute" (7" edit) 4:30 from Silk & Steel
2. "Whenever You're Ready" (7" edit) 4:18 from Between the Lines
3. "Rain or Shine" (7" single) 4:00 from Silk & Steel
4. "Find the Time" (7" remix edit) 3:58 from Silk & Steel
5. "System Addict" 4:04 from Luxury of Life
6. "Stay Out of My Life" (7" edit) 3:51 from Silk & Steel
7. "Let Me Be the One" (7" edit) 3:40 from Luxury of Life
8. "Rock My World" (7" edit) 4:06 from Rock the World
9. "With Every Heartbeat" (CD and cassette only) 4:11 Non-album single
10. "The Slightest Touch" (7" remix) 4:19 from Silk & Steel
11. "All Fall Down" 3:30 from Luxury of Life
12. "If I Say Yes" (U.S. 7" remix) 3:43 from Silk & Steel
13. "Somewhere Somebody" (7" edit) 4:06 from Between the Lines
14. "R.S.V.P." (7" edit) 3:28 from Luxury of Life
15. "Strong as Steel" (7" edit) 4:27 from Between the Lines
16. "Love Take Over" 3:49 from Luxury of Life
17. "Another Weekend" (7" edit) 4:10 from Rock the World
18. "Something About My Baby" (CD and cassette only) 3:43 Previously unreleased

== Video version ==
Greatest Hits

Video by Five Star
- Released: 1989
- Recorded: 1985–1988
- Length: 64 minutes
- Label: BMG Video

Five Star chronology
Between the Lines (1987)	Greatest Hits (1989)	Five Star Performance (2007)

A version of the compilation with 15 music videos was also released on VHS in 1989. In contrast to the audio versions of the compilation, the music videos are presented in chronological order, with short intros (made from a snippet from the relevant video) between each song.

No.	Title	Director(s)	Length
1.	"All Fall Down"	Christopher Robin Collins
2.	"Let Me Be the One"	Christopher Robin Collins
3.	"Love Take Over"	Sebastian Harris
4.	"R.S.V.P."	Sebastian Harris
5.	"System Addict"	Sebastian Harris
6.	"Can't Wait Another Minute"	Chris Gabrin
7.	"Find the Time"	Christopher Robin Collins
8.	"Rain or Shine"	Christopher Robin Collins
9.	"If I Say Yes"	Brian Ward
10.	"Stay Out of My Life"	Christopher Robin Collins
11.	"The Slightest Touch"	Dominic Orlando
12.	"Whenever You're Ready"	Christopher Robin Collins
13.	"Strong As Steel"	Christopher Robin Collins
14.	"Another Weekend"	Geoff Wonfor
15.	"Rock My World"	Geoff Wonfor
