= Denise Pearson =

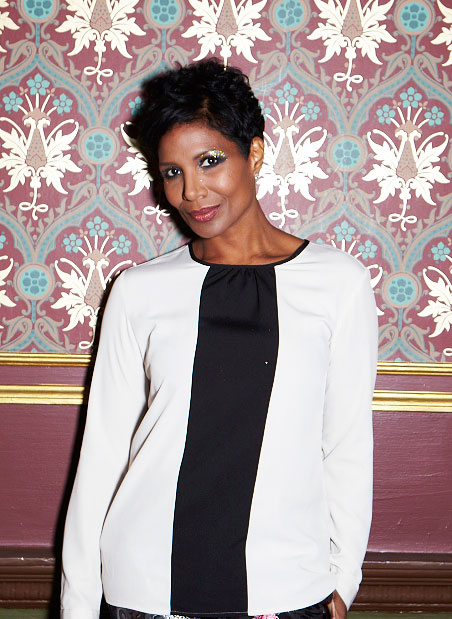
- Pearson in 2012

Background information
- Born: Denise Lisa Maria Pearson; 13 June 1968 (age 58); Islington, London, UK
- Genres: Pop, rock, soul, R&B, funk, disco, dance
- Occupation: Singer-songwriter
- Years active: 1983–present
- Labels: Epic, RCA, Tent Records, Baronet Entertainment
- Member of: Five Star
- Website: www.deniecepearsonofficial.com

Denise Lisa Maria Pearson (born 13 June 1968), sometimes credited as Deniece Pearson, is an English singer-songwriter. She was the lead vocalist with the British pop/R&B group Five Star, which comprised herself and her four siblings. The group was created and managed by their father, Buster Pearson, in 1983. The group officially disbanded in 2001, though partial reunions have occurred since.

== Career with Five Star ==
As well as being lead singer, Pearson was also the most prolific composer of the group. Five Star tracks written by her include "Stay Out of My Life" (1986) (Five Star's only self-composed top-ten single), "Hard Race" (1987), "There's a Brand New World" (1988) and "What About Me Baby" (1990); ballads such as "Live Giving Love" (1987), "Let Me Be Yours" (1988), "Feel Much Better" (1990), "Funktafied" (2001), "Don't Let Me Be the Lonely One" (2001) and "Tell Me What You Want" (2001); and the uptempo "I'm Still Waiting" (1990), "Tienes Mi Amour" (1990), "Going With the Moment" (1994) and "Show Me" (1994).

In 1986, Five Star received a Grammy Award nomination in the "Best Rhythm and Blues Instrumental Performance" category for Pearson's composition, "First Avenue", which was the B-Side of Five Star's first hit single "All Fall Down".

== After Five Star ==
Projects outside of Five Star included a 1997 recording of "This Pain", a duet with former Bros singer Matt Goss. Pearson was featured singing backing vocals for Tamia in 2001 for the song "Stranger in My House" (as heard on the WB series For Your Love).

In 2005, Pearson and singer-songwriter Ryan Tedder of the group OneRepublic wrote several songs together including "Over You" sung by Denise herself, and "Strike" which was performed by US teen sensation Nikki Flores. They also worked together on a new version of Five Star's 1986 hit single "System Addict".

In 2007, Pearson announced she was working on solo material. In May 2008, she recorded a promotional video for one of her tracks, alongside brother Stedman, and a team of trained backing singers and dancers, Denise played several dates as Five Star to celebrate the group's 25th anniversary.

In 2009, Pearson made her West End Theatre debut in the show Thriller – Live, a musical based on the music of Michael Jackson. In 2009, City Life magazine described her as "uncannily pitch perfect as a female answer to MJ [Michael Jackson]".

In September 2011, Pearson appeared as one of the lead singers in the new West End show Respect La Diva which ran at the Garrick Theatre for a limited run.

In March 2012, Denise appeared on BBC talent show, The Voice UK, as a contestant. She joined the team of Tom Jones after singing Fighter by Christina Aguilera. She was, however, credited as Deniece Pearson. During the second round of the contest, her rival Ruth Brown was picked by coach Tom Jones over her for the live finals.

In December 2012, Pearson appeared in her first pantomime, starring as the Fairy Godmother in Cinderella at the Milton Keynes Theatre alongside Louie Spence. In the show she earned excellent reviews and sang three songs - "Don't Leave Me This Way", "Let It Be" and "Once Upon A Time" - of which the latter two can be found on a mini-album released at the same time, simply entitled Deniece Pearson.

With a new management deal signed to Baronet Entertainment, Denise supported The Jacksons on the UK leg of their Unity tour in February and March 2013.

In September 2013, Pearson released an EP called "Freak Dance" and made a video of the same name which premiered on "The Chart Show". The EP also featured a song called "Rafiki Yangu" (Swahili for 'my friend') a tribute to and celebration of Nelson Mandela, and of Africa's fight for peace and posterity. All profits from the sales of the song were donated to the Nelson Mandela Children's Fund (UK).

Pearson's first ever solo album, Imprint, was released in June 2014 and features input from US producer Wayne Gerard.

Pearson toured the UK throughout 2015 with her siblings Stedman, Doris and Delroy performing at 1980s revival gigs.

Pearson appeared as a guest vocalist on the New Year's Day edition of Top of the Pops in 2016, performing to Sigala's number one hit "Easy Love".

Pearson sat as a member of the UK jury for the Eurovision Song Contest 2022.

12 August 2023 Deniece performed a 40th Anniversary show at Pizza Express Live Holborn, with a second show 30 September 2023.

Pearson's sophomore solo album, Free-Queen-See, released in November 2025. It was preceded by singles Forever Young, Evolution X and Like A Child in 2023, 2024 and 2025 respectively.

== Personal life ==
After moving to California in the United States with her family in the early 1990s, Pearson married, becoming Denise Saneinia. Despite divorcing in the late 1990s, she has kept this name for her subsequent songwriting credits, but still performs under the name Denise Pearson. In 1994 she gave birth to a son followed by a daughter a year later. Pearson moved back to the UK with her children in 2005.

== Discography ==
=== Albums ===
==== with Five Star ====
- Luxury of Life (1985)
- Silk and Steel (1986)
- Between the Lines (1987)
- Rock the World (1988)
- Five Star (1990)
- Shine (1991)
- Heart and Soul (1995)
- Eclipse (2001)

==== Solo ====
- Imprint (2014) (#21 Official Hip Hop and R&B Albums Chart) (#19 Official Independent Album Breakers Chart)
- Free-Queen-See (2025)

=== Extended Plays ===
- Deniece EP (2012)
- Demo Tracks (2013)

=== Singles ===
==== Solo ====
- Here I Am (2009)
- Freak Dance (2013)
- Rafiki Yangu (2013)
- Close To Nowhere (2013)
- Free Fall (2014)
- Twisted Electric (2014)
- You Raise Me Up (2020)
- Santa Claus Is Coming (2023)
- Forever Young (2023)
- Evolution X (2024)
- Finding Rhythm ft. Ashley Paul (2025)
- Like A Child (2025)
- I Didn't Know (2025)
- We Found Love (2026)
- Berry (2026)
- The Magic Comes Alive (2026)
