= Best Guy =

- Film poster

Japanese name
- Kanji: ベストガイ
Transcriptions
- Revised Hepburn: Besuto Gai
- Directed by: Tōru Murakawa
- Written by: Makoto Takada; Tōru Murakawa
- Produced by: Yasuhiro Hasegawa; Akio Yamaguchi; Yosuke Mizuno; Yoshihiro Kojima; Michio Tohohara
- Starring: Yūji Oda; Naomi Zaizen; Masato Furuoya; Masato Nagamori; Toshio Kurosawa
- Cinematography: Yoshitaka Sakamoto
- Edited by: Masaaki Kawashima
- Music by: Minoru Yamazaki
- Production companies: Toei; Mitsui & Co.; Tohokushinsha Film
- Distributed by: Toei
- Release date: December 15, 1990
- Running time: 115 minutes
- Country: Japan
- Language: Japanese
- Box office: ¥230 million

Best Guy (Japanese: ベストガイ, Hepburn: Besuto Gai) is a 1990 Japanese action film directed by Tōru Murakawa, and produced by Toei Company in association with Mitsui & Co. and Tohokushinsha Film. The screenplay was written by Murakawa with Makoto Takada. The film stars Yūji Oda, Naomi Zaizen, Masato Furuoya, Masato Nagamori, and Toshio Kurosawa. The title refers to the highest rank of the JASDF's F-15J training program.

The film's aerial scenes were produced in cooperation with the JASDF, using the Mitsubishi F-15J - the country's variant of the McDonnell Douglas F-15 Eagle. Seen by movie critics as a copy of Top Gun, Best Guy was a box-office failure in Japan, earning ¥230 million.

== Plot ==
Fresh from his transfer from Nyutabaru Air Base to Chitose Air Base, Lieutenant Hideo "Goku" Kajitani joins the 201st Tactical Air Squadron and participates in the base's three-week fighter training program with the goal of attaining the title of "Best Guy". Despite having his pilot's license revoked three times at Nyutabaru, he has earned the title "Eagle Driver" (イーグル･ドライバー, Īguru Doraibā) due to his natural expertise in piloting the Mitsubishi F-15J. Goku feels animosity towards his trainer Major Nobuaki "Zombie" Yoshinaga, who he feels is responsible for his brother Tetsuo's death in a flight accident years ago. At the same time, he develops a rivalry with Captain Teruichi "Imagine" Nadaka, who dislikes Goku's reckless piloting skills. For the training program, Goku is assigned to the Fox team led by Lt. Colonel Tadayuki "Odyssey" Yamamoto, while Imagine becomes part of the Bear team led by Zombie. During his time at Chitose, Goku befriends Miyuki Mizuno, a video director sent to the base to film a music video for Canadian singer Sheree, but decides to cover the Best Guy program instead.

One day, Goku and Imagine scramble when a couple of Soviet Tu-16 Badgers enter Japanese airspace. Following a dogfight with the Su-27 Flankers, the duo manages to drive the intruding aircraft away. On their way back to Chitose, Goku suddenly experiences vertigo and loses control of his plane before he ejects and is safely rescued at sea. Because of this, he loses confidence in flying. Zombie visits Goku at his quarters, but Goku's hatred leads to him attacking Zombie before the latter reveals the truth about his brother's death. On that fateful night, Zombie (who used the call sign "Demon") was Tetsuo's radar intercept officer when their F-4EJ Phantom II flew into an electrical storm outside Komatsu Base and Tetsuo blacked out from vertigo; Zombie ejected before their plane crashed. Feeling further demotivated by the truth, Goku leaves for Kyushu to reconcile with an old lover, only to discover that she has moved on with another man. He then travels to Tokyo to meet up with Miyuki, who reveals that her documentary video was cancelled due to a sponsor dropping out of the project. After seeing her emotions, Goku realizes his purpose in life and returns to Chitose.

The final day of training is decided between Goku and Imagine, with Miyuki filming the event. During the fierce mock dogfight, Imagine scores the kill on Goku and is awarded the title of "Best Guy" while Goku takes the runner-up title of "Top Gun" and Second Lieutenant Atsuo "Duck" Nakagawa takes the third place title of "Early Bird". Following the program, Odyssey retires and bids farewell to the 201st Squadron, with Goku and Imagine escorting his plane off the base.

== Cast ==
- Yūji Oda as Lieutenant Hideo "Goku" Kajitani
- Naomi Zaizen as Miyuki Mizuno
- Masato Furuoya as Major Nobuaki "Zombie/Demon" Yoshinaga
- Masato Nagamori as Captain Teruichi "Imagine" Nadaka
- Toshio Kurosawa as Lt. Colonel Tadayuki "Odyssey" Yamamoto
- Masahiro Sudou as Major Haruo "Thunder" Yashiki
- Mikihisa Azuma as Second Lieutenant Yoshitaka "Robin" Muramatsu
- Zenkichi Yoneyama as Second Lieutenant Atsuo "Duck" Nakagawa
- Hikaru Kurosaki as Junior Officer Yusuke "Yunker" Tateishi
- Chiharu Iwamoto as Second Lieutenant Akiko Shibata
- Akiji Kobayashi as Yoshi Kamogawa
- Masaru Matsuda as Tsuyoshi Tokuda
- Jun Negami as Taichirō Kanō
- Akiko Kana as Yumiko Yoshinaga
- Chiyoko Shimakura as the Chief Nurse
- Takaaki Enoki as Tetsuo "Apollo" Kajitani
- Naoto Takenaka as the Air Traffic Controller

== Soundtrack ==
Best Guy: Original Soundtrack

Soundtrack album by Various artists
- Released: October 21, 1990
- Genre: Film score; pop rock
- Length: 52:25
- Language: English; Japanese
- Label: BMG Victor

The soundtrack album was released by BMG Victor on October 21, 1990, and features songs performed by Canadian singer Sheree, who also makes an appearance in the beginning of the film.

=== Track listing ===
No.	Title	Writer(s)	Performer	Length
1.	"Ridin' High"	Yuichi Ikuzawa	Yuichi Ikuzawa	4:21
2.	"Where the Heroes Now"	Ikuzawa	Yuichi Ikuzawa	4:12
3.	"Woman's Work"	B. J. Cook; Lou Pomanti; Sheree Jeacocke	Sheree	4:18
4.	"Head On Pass"	Minoru Yamazaki	Minoru Yamazaki	4:37
5.	"Love in the Sky"	Amy; Yuiko Tsubokura; Hiroshi Terao	Yuiko Tsubokura	4:26
6.	"The Emblem"	Yamazaki	Minoru Yamazaki	1:56
7.	"Life Can Be So Good"	Fusanosuke Kondo	Fusanosuke Kondo	4:33
8.	"Bang On" (Edit)	Joel Feeney; Rachel Oldfield; Scott Humphrey; Tim Thorney	Sheree	3:56
9.	"Illumination"	Yamazaki	Minoru Yamazaki	3:46
10.	"Where Do We Go from Here?"	Jeacocke	Sheree	4:52
11.	"Barrel Roll Lock"	Yamazaki	Minoru Yamazaki	2:43
12.	"Lady Luck"	Ikuzawa	Yuichi Ikuzawa	2:38
13.	"Best Guy" (V.L. Mix)	Jeacocke	Sheree	6:41
Total length:				52:25

== Marketing ==
Hasegawa issued a "Best Guy" edition of their 1/48 scale F-15J Eagle model kit to promote the film.

== See also ==
- Top Gun
