= Strong as Steel (song) =

1987 single by Five Star

Single by Five Star

from the album Between the Lines
- B-side: "The Man"
- Released: 28 September 1987
- Length: 4:18
- Label: RCA, Tent
- Songwriter: Diane Warren
- Producer: Dennis Lambert

Five Star singles chronology
"Whenever You're Ready" (1987)	"Strong as Steel" (1987)	"Somewhere Somebody" (1987)

"Strong as Steel" is a song by British pop music group Five Star, released as the second single from their third album, Between the Lines. Written by American songwriter Diane Warren, the single peaked at number 16 on the UK Singles Chart.

== Track listings ==
7-inch single

A. "Strong as Steel" (edit)
B. "The Man"

12-inch and cassette single

1. "Strong As Steel" (album version)
2. "The Man"
3. "Can't Wait Another Minute" (M&M Groove remix)

12-inch single 2

1. "Strong as Steel" (edit)
2. "The Man"
3. "The Five Star Hit Mix"
- "The Five Star Hit Mix" consists of "Can't Wait Another Minute", "Let Me Be the One", "All Fall Down", "Whenever You're Ready", "Find the Time", "If I Say Yes", "R.S.V.P.", "Love Take Over", and "The Slightest Touch"

== Charts ==
Weekly chart performance for "Strong as Steel" by Five Star
Chart (1987)	Peak position
Europe (European Hot 100 Singles)	57
Ireland (IRMA)	9
Netherlands (Single Top 100)	100
UK Singles (OCC)	16

== Tina Arena version ==
"Strong as Steel"

Single by Tina Arena

from the album Strong as Steel
- Released: November 1990
- Length: 5:06
- Songwriter: Diane Warren

Tina Arena singles chronology
"The Machine's Breaking Down" (1990)	"Strong as Steel" (1990)	"Woman's Work" (1991)

Australian singer Tina Arena released her version of the song as a single from her first album, Strong as Steel (1990).

=== Charts ===
Weekly chart performance for "Strong as Steel" by Tina Arena
Chart (1990)	Peak position
Australia (ARIA)	30

== Other cover versions ==
- American singer Gregory Abbott covered the song for the soundtrack of the 1989 film Tap.
- American R&B singer Gladys Knight covered the song in 1990, which was featured in the soundtrack for the 1990 film Ghost Dad, starring Bill Cosby and Kimberly Russell.
- In 1997, Diane Warren released a promotional compilation of songs written by her titled A Passion for Music. Included on the track list is the original demo of the song, sung by Jeff Pescetto.
