= Strong as Steel =

Studio album by Tina Arena
- Released: 22 October 1990; 27 May 1996 (reissue)
- Recorded: 1987–1990
- Studio: Metropolis Audio Australia (Melbourne, Victoria)
- Genre: Dance-pop; disco; pop rock
- Length: 64:55
- Label: EMI
- Producer: Doug Brady; Ross Inglis

Tina Arena chronology
Tiny Tina and Little John (1977)	Strong as Steel (1990)	Don't Ask (1994)

Alternative album cover
- 1996 re-release

Singles from Strong as Steel
- 1. "I Need Your Body" Released: 7 May 1990; 2. "The Machine's Breaking Down" Released: 30 July 1990; 3. "Strong as Steel" Released: 29 October 1990; 4. "Woman's Work" Released: March 1991

Strong as Steel is the second studio album by Australian pop singer Tina Arena, released in 1990 by EMI.

== Album information ==
The album has a very light tone and a pop rock feel to it compared to Arena's subsequent albums, which were darker and more personal.

Strong as Steel was re-released in 1996 by Sony Music, however the re-release is substantially different from the original version. The cover art for the re-release is completely different and only five of the thirteen tracks from the original version are included. Five previously unreleased songs (including a demo destined for her next studio effort) recorded at a later date were added for a total of ten tracks on the new version. The uniqueness and rarity of the original 1990 version has made it a highly sought after collector's item.

== Track listing ==
No.	Title	Writer(s)	Length
1.	"Woman's Work"	B.J. Cook, Sheree Jeacocke, Lou Pomanti	4:21
2.	"I Need Your Body"	Ross Inglis	4:04
3.	"Close to My Heart"	David A Stewart, Richard Feldman	4:09
4.	"For the Sake of Talking"	Ross Inglis	4:51
5.	"Rumour Has It"	Ross Inglis, Mike Brady	3:55
6.	"Images of Love"	Ross Inglis	4:14
7.	"Strong as Steel"	Diane Warren	5:08
8.	"The Machine's Breaking Down"	Ross Inglis	4:38
9.	"I'll Be Here"	Ross Inglis	5:32
10.	"Stagefright"	Ross Inglis	3:39
11.	"I Believe (When I Fall in Love It Will Be Forever)"	Stevie Wonder, Yvonne Wright	5:48
12.	"I Need Your Body" (Original 12" Mix)	Ross Inglis	6:24
13.	"The Machine's Breaking Down" (Club Mix Hot Dr. Mix)	Ross Inglis	8:06

1996 re-release
No.	Title	Writer(s)	Length
1.	"Strong as Steel"	Diane Warren	5:06
2.	"Woman's Work"	B.J. Cook, Sheree Jeacocke, Lou Pomanti	4:16
3.	"I Need Your Body"	Ross Inglis	3:59
4.	"Wouldn't Change a Thing"	Arena, Pam Reswick, Steve Werfel	3:56
5.	"Best for You"	Arena, Reswick, Werfel	3:40
6.	"On the Line"	Arena, Reswick, Werfel	4:14
7.	"You Make Me Feel Good"	Reswick, Werfel	3:46
8.	"The Machine's Breaking Down"	Ross Inglis	4:36
9.	"I Believe"	Stevie Wonder, Yvonne Wright	5:48
10.	"Be a Man" (demo version)	Arena, Reswick, Werfel	4:17

== Production ==
- Producers: Tina Arena, Doug Brady, Ross Inglis, Pam Reswick, Steve Werfel
- Art direction: Pierre Baroni
- Design: Pierre Baroni
- Photography: Pierre Baroni

== Charts ==
Weekly chart performance for Strong as Steel
Chart (1990)	Peak position
Australian Albums (ARIA)	17
