= Another Weekend =

Another Weekend may refer to:

- "Another Weekend" (Five Star song), 1988
- "Another Weekend", 2017 song by Ariel Pink from the album Dedicated to Bobby Jameson
