= Woman's Work =

1989 song by Sheree Jeacocke

Single by Tina Arena

from the album Strong as Steel
- B-side: "I Believe"
- Released: 18 March 1991
- Genre: Pop; synth-pop
- Length: 3:40 (single edit)
- Label: EMI
- Songwriters: Sheree Jeacocke; Lou Pomanti; Bonnie J. Cooke
- Producers: Doug Brady; Ross Ingles

Tina Arena singles chronology
"Strong as Steel" (1990)	"Woman's Work" (1991)	"Chains" (1994)

"Woman's Work"

Single by Tracey Brown

from the album Woman's Work
- Released: 1998
- Genre: Country
- Length: 3:18
- Label: Popular
- Songwriters: Sheree Jeacocke, Lou Pomanti, Bonnie J. Cooke
- Producer: Randall Prescott

Tracey Brown singles chronology
"Woman's Work" (1998)	"Going Going Gone" (1999)

"Woman's Work" is a song written by Canadian singer-songwriter Sheree Jeacocke with Lou Pomanti and Bonnie J. Cooke. It was originally recorded by Jeacocke and released as a single in 1989, and was featured in the 1990 Japanese film Best Guy. The song was covered by Australian pop singer Tina Arena on her 1990 album Strong as Steel and released as the album's fourth and final single in 1991. The single failed to chart in Australia.

The song was also covered by Canadian country music artist Tracey Brown on her 1998 debut solo album of the same name and released as the album's first single. Brown's version peaked at number 12 on the RPM Country Tracks chart in September 1998.

== Track listing ==
=== Tina Arena ===
"Woman's Work" was released as a 7" single.

1. "Woman's Work" (single edit) – 3:40
2. "I Believe" – 5:47

== Chart performance ==
=== Tracey Brown ===
Chart (1998)	Peak position
Canada Country Singles (RPM)	12

==== Year-end charts ====
Chart (1998)	Position
Canada Country Tracks (RPM)	72
