= I Need Your Body =

1990 single by Tina Arena

Single by Tina Arena

from the album Strong as Steel
- B-side: "Stagefright"
- Released: 30 April 1990
- Length: 3:59
- Label: Avenue
- Songwriter(s): Ross Inglis
- Producer(s): Doug Brady, Ross Inglis

Tina Arena singles chronology
"Turn Up the Beat" (1985)	"I Need Your Body" (1990)	"The Machine's Breaking Down" (1990)

"I Need Your Body" is the second single by Australian pop singer Tina Arena, released in Australia in April 1990. It was Arena's first single to receive commercial success in Australia and was certified platinum by the Australian Recording Industry Association (ARIA). It peaked at number three on the Australian Singles Chart and was placed at number 17 on the ARIA year-end chart for 1990.

== Song information ==
"I Need Your Body" was written by Ross Inglis, who also produced it along with Doug Brady. It was recorded at Metropolis Audio in Melbourne. The song and the video were parodied on Fast Forward by Gina Riley in 1990.

== Track listings ==
Australian 7-inch and cassette single

1. "I Need Your Body" – 3:59
2. "Stagefright" – 3:34

Australian 12-inch single 1

1. "I Need Your Body" (12-inch mix) – 6:26
2. "I Need Your Body" (radio mix) – 3:59
3. "I Need Your Body" (Mini mix) – 6:14
4. "Stagefright" – 3:34

Australian 12-inch single 2

1. "I Need Your Body" (Hot D.J. mix) – 10:10
2. "I Need Your Body" (radio mix) – 3:59
3. "I Need Your Body" (Mini mix) – 6:14
4. "Stagefright" – 3:34

Scandinavian 7-inch single

1. "I Need Your Body" (7-inch mix) – 4:20
2. "I Need Your Body" (Mini mix) – 6:14

== Charts ==
=== Weekly charts ===
Chart (1990)	Peak position
Australia (ARIA)	3

=== Year-end charts ===
Chart (1990)	Position
Australia (ARIA)	17

== Certifications ==
Region	Certification	Certified units/sales
Australia (ARIA)	Platinum	70,000^{^}
^{^} Shipments figures based on certification alone.
