= The Machine's Breaking Down =

1990 single by Tina Arena

Single by Tina Arena

from the album Strong as Steel
- B-side: "Rumour Has It"
- Released: 30 July 1990
- Length: 4:38
- Label: Avenue
- Songwriter: Ross Inglis
- Producers: Doug Brady, Ross Inglis

Tina Arena singles chronology
"I Need Your Body" (1990)	"The Machine's Breaking Down" (1990)	"Strong as Steel" (1990)

"The Machine's Breaking Down" is a song by Australian pop singer Tina Arena, released as the second single from her 1990 debut album, Strong as Steel. It peaked at number 23 on the Australian Singles Chart.

== Song information ==
"The Machine's Breaking Down" was written by Ross Inglis, who also produced it along with Doug Brady. It was recorded at Metropolis Audio in Melbourne.

== Track listings ==
Australian 7-inch and cassette single

1. "The Machine's Breaking Down" – 4:38
2. "Rumour Has It" – 3:55

Australian 12-inch single

1. "The Machine's Breaking Down" (club mix Hot Dr. mix)
2. "The Machine's Breaking Down" (radio mix)
3. "The Machine's Breaking Down" (extended dance mix)
4. "Rumour Has It"

== Charts ==
Chart (1990)	Peak position
Australia (ARIA)	23
