= Another Weekend (Five Star song) =

1988 single by Five Star

Single by Five Star

from the album Rock the World
- B-side: "The Mews"
- Released: 23 May 1988
- Genre: Pop
- Length: 5:20
- Label: RCA, Tent
- Songwriter: Leon Sylvers III
- Producer: Leon Sylvers III

Five Star singles chronology
"Somewhere Somebody" (1987)	"Another Weekend" (1988)	"Rock My World" (1988)

"Another Weekend" is a song by the British pop music group Five Star. It peaked at number 18 on the UK Singles Chart and number 23 on the US Billboard Hot Black Singles chart.

== History ==
The single was a return to the charts for the group after a short break to record their fourth LP Rock the World. Due to declining record sales, the group was intent on changing their clean-cut image. They opted for a new, raunchier leather-clad look in the accompanying video, whilst the track demonstrated a slightly harder edged dance sound. However, the changes were not enough to reverse the group's decline, and sales continued to dwindle.

== Track listings ==
7-inch single

A. "Another Weekend" (edit)
B. "The Mews"

12-inch single 1

1. "Another Weekend" (Friday Night mix)
2. "Another Weekend" (Friday Night dub mix)
3. "The Mews"

12-inch single 2

1. "Another Weekend" (Saturday Night mix)
2. "The Mews" (edit)
3. "The Five Star Hit Mix"
- "The Five Star Hit Mix" consists of "Can't Wait Another Minute", "Let Me Be the One", "All Fall Down", "Whenever You're Ready", "Find the Time", "If I Say Yes", "R.S.V.P.", "Love Take Over", and "The Slightest Touch"

US 12-inch and cassette single

1. "Another Weekend" (12-inch mix)
2. "Another Weekend" (7-inch edit)
3. "Another Weekend" (Saturday Night mix)
4. "Another Weekend" (Friday Night dub mix)
5. "U"

== Charts ==
Chart (1988–1989)	Peak position
Europe (Eurochart Hot 100)	63
Ireland (IRMA)	12
Netherlands (Single Top 100)	24
UK Singles (OCC)	18
US Hot Black Singles (Billboard)	23
