= I Give You Give =

Single by Five Star

from the album Heart and Soul
- Released: October 1995
- Genre: Pop
- Length: 4:00
- Label: Tent
- Songwriters: Doris Pearson, Christopher Troy, William Harmond
- Producer: Buster Pearson

Five Star singles chronology
"I Love You For Sentimental Reasons" (1995)	"I Give You Give" (1995)	"Funktafied" (2001)

"I Give You Give" is a 1995 single by the British pop group Five Star. It was the band's final single as a five-piece band, and was released on their family label Tent Records. The single reached #83 in the UK Singles Chart.

The single was released in three different coloured sleeves: blue, orange and white. The video features four members of the band dancing in yellow high visibility jackets, though lead singer Denise was unable to dance at the time as she was pregnant with her second child.

UK Catalogue Number: Tent TRIFSCD3

== Track listings ==
Cassette single

1. I Give You Give (Radio Edit)
2. I Give You Give (Radio Edit Remix)

CD Single 1

1. I Give You Give (Radio Edit Remix)
2. I Give You Give (Radio Edit)
3. I Give You Give (Extended Club Mix)
4. I Give You Give (Fat Mix)
5. I Give You Give (Swung Out Mix)

CD Single 2

1. I Give You Give (Radio Edit Remix)
2. I Give You Give (Extended Remix)
3. I Give You Give (Tuff Mix)
4. I Give You Give (Swung Out Radio)

12” Single 1

1. I Give You Give (Extended Club Remix)
2. I Give You Give (Swung Out Radio)
3. I Give You Give (Tuff Mix)
4. I Give You (Radio Edit Remix)

CD Single 3

1. I Give You Give (Radio Remix)
2. I Give You Give (Extended Remix)
3. I Give You Give (Radio Edit)
4. I Give You Give (Extended Club Mix)
5. I Give You Give (Instrumental)
6. I Give You Give (Tuff Mix)

12" Single 2

1. I Give You Give (Extended Remix)
2. I Give You Give (Extended Club Mix)
3. I Give You Give (Tuff Mix)
4. I Give You Give (Radio Edit)
