= Let Me Be Yours =

Single by Five Star

from the album Rock the World
- B-side: "Rare Groove"
- Released: 7 November 1988
- Genre: Pop
- Length: 4:11
- Label: RCA, Tent
- Songwriter: Deniece Pearson
- Producer: Deniece Pearson

Five Star singles chronology
"There's a Brand New World" (1988)	"Let Me Be Yours" (1988)	"With Every Heartbeat" (1989)

"Let Me Be Yours" is the name of a 1988 single by the British pop group Five Star. Released in November of that year as their intended Christmas single, the track entered the UK charts at #51 but failed to go any higher.

The track was the fourth and final single to be taken from the group's fourth album Rock the World.

== Track listings ==
7" single:

1. Let Me Be Yours

2. Rare Groove

12" single:

1. Let Me Be Yours (Remix)

2. Rare Groove

3. Someone's In Love (Dub Mix)

CD single:

1. Let Me Be Yours

2. Someone's In Love (Dub Mix)

3. Can't Wait Another Minute (M&M Groove Remix) – although this mix is listed, it actually plays the (12" Mix)

4. Rare Groove

All tracks available on the remastered versions of either the 2012 'Rock The World' album, the 2013 'The Remix Anthology (The Remixes 1984-1991)' or the 2018 'Luxury - The Definitive Anthology 1984-1991' boxset.

== Charts ==
Chart (1988)	Peak position
UK Singles (OCC)	51
