= Someone's in Love =

Single by Five Star

from the album Rock the World
- B-side: "Rare Groove"
- Released: 10 September 1988
- Genre: Pop
- Length: 4:22
- Label: RCA Victor, Tent
- Songwriter(s): Doris Pearson, Delroy Pearson
- Producer(s): Doris Pearson, Delroy Pearson

Five Star singles chronology
"Rock My World" (1988)	"Someone's in Love" (1988)	"There's a Brand New World" (1988)

"Someone's in Love" is the name of a 1988 US only remixed single by British pop group Five Star. It reached #36 on the US R&B Billboard chart. The single was the third of five releases from their album and the lead single from the album Rock the World in USA.

Doris sang the lead vocals on this track rather than sister Denise, who was lead singer on all of Five Star's singles up to this point.

The Radio Mix was used on the US edition of the Rock the World album.

== Track listings ==
7" single

1. Someone's In Love (7" Radio Mix) 4:08 – featured on US pressing of Rock The World album *
2. Rare Groove

12" single

1. Someone's In Love (R&B Dance Mix w/o Rap)
2. Someone's In Love (Some Dub Mix)
3. Someone's In Love (LP Mix) – NB version not actually featured on LP
4. Someone's In Love (7" Radio Mix) – featured on US pressing of Rock the World album
5. Rare Groove

All tracks available on the remastered versions of either the 2012 'Rock The World' album, the 2013 'The Remix Anthology (The Remixes 1984-1991)' or the 2018 'Luxury - The Definitive Anthology 1984-1991' boxset.
