= Funktafied =

2001 single by Five Star

Single by Five Star

from the album Eclipse
- Released: 15 July 2001
- Genre: Pop
- Length: 4:55
- Label: Tent
- Songwriter(s): Doris Pearson, Delroy Pearson
- Producer(s): Buster Pearson

Five Star singles chronology
"Surely" (2001)	"Funktafied" (2001)	"System Addict 2005" (2005)

"Funktafied" is the name of a 2001 single by British pop group Five Star, peaking at #26 on the U.S. Hot R&B/Hip-Hop Songs singles sales chart in July of that year and becoming their first single from their Eclipse album. The single was a U.S. only release and only available in the UK on import.

The single became the group's biggest American single in twelve years, their previous hit being "Another Weekend", which reached #23 in 1989.

== Track list ==
CD Single:

1. Funktafied (Bounce Joint Mix)
2. Funktafied (World Mix 2001)
3. Funktafied (Yeah, Yeah, Yeah, Bounce Mix 2)
4. Funktafied (Single/Album Version)
