= Turn Up the Beat =

Single by Tina
- Released: 9 September 1985
- Recorded: 1984
- Studio: Armstrong Studios, Melbourne
- Genre: Dance-pop, synthpop
- Label: Graffiti Records
- Songwriter(s): Clyde Lieberman, Pam Reswick, Steve Werfel
- Producer(s): Brian Cadd

Tina singles chronology
| "Turn Up the Beat" (1985) | "I Need Your Body" (1990) |

"Turn Up the Beat" is the debut single by Australian pop singer Tina Arena, released under the name of Tina.

== Background and release ==
From 1977, Arena was a regular on Australian television show Young Talent Time. She left the show in October 1983, ahead of her 16th birthday. After leaving the show, Tina began playing music with Young Talent Time's floor manager Greg Petherick and the pair recorded some demos that were submitted to record labels. Arena was eventually signed as the first artist on Brian Cadd's new label Graffiti Records. Cadd bought the rights to a song called "Turn Up the Beat", which Arena liked because "it was up-tempo and fun, a song about how sometimes music is more important that just about anything else".

A music video was released, but with the song peaking at number 92, the planned album was scrapped.

== Track listings ==
=== 7" single ===
- A1. "Turn Up the Beat"
- B1. "Dreamer"

=== 12" single ===
- A1. "Turn Up the Beat" (Extended Beat Mix)
- B1. "The Chant"
- B2. "Dreamer"

== Charts ==
| Chart (1986) | Peak position |
|---|---|
| Australia (Kent Music Report) | 92 |
