= Sheree Jeacocke =

Canadian singer-songwriter (born 1958)

- Also known as: Sheree; J-Cock; Deeva
- Born: 1958 (age 67–68); Toronto, Ontario, Canada
- Genres: Pop rock; Eurodance
- Occupations: Singer-songwriter
- Instruments: Vocals
- Years active: 1982–1997
- Label: BMG
- Spouse: Larry Cerqua
- Website: www.shereecerqua.com

Sheree Jeacocke (born 1958) is a Canadian singer-songwriter.

During the early 1980s Jeacocke starred in the CBC-TV musical The King Of Friday Night and worked as a backup singer for Gordon Lightfoot, Rita MacNeil, Glass Tiger and Kim Mitchell. In 1982, she released her first single "Maybe You've Gotta Hurt". Three years later, Jeacocke released her second single "You Get to Me". Her 1985 debut album Feel It earned her a nomination for "Most Promising Female Vocalist of the Year" at the Juno Awards of 1986. Much of her financial success in music was in singing jingles for many 1980s Canadian broadcast advertisements.

Jeacocke signed a contract with BMG in 1989 and released her second album Sheree. The first single, "Woman's Work" became her biggest hit as a lead vocalist, hitting the Canadian Top 10 in February 1990. The song was later remade by Tina Arena, among others. Jeacocke participated in the Best Guy movie soundtrack, released in Japan, on which she sings "Best Guy", "Woman's Work", "Bang On" and "Where Do We Go From Here?". In 1993, she released her third and last album, Miss My Love, whose singles were the title track and "Serious". Jeacocke also recorded the opening theme of the 1994 animated series Wild C.A.T.s.

After her contract with BMG ended, Jeacocke independently released the EP Jeacocke in 1995, which included a remake of "Woman's Work" and a remake of the Jean Knight hit "Mr. Big Stuff". The dance remixes of "Mr. Big Stuff" became a hit in the clubs, which led to her collaboration on various dance singles. In the mid-1990s, using the pseudonym J-Cock (the pronunciation of her surname), and with the act Pleasure Beat, she released eurodance remakes of Robin Beck's "First Time" and the Beatles' "Come Together", as well as a solo remake of Stevie Wonder's "You Are the Sunshine of My Life" and Queen's "We Will Rock You" (as Deeva). After a few more dance releases she left the recording industry for the most part.

Today, she is known as Sheree Cerqua, a Toronto real estate agent like her husband Larry Cerqua.

== Discography ==
=== Albums ===
- Feel It (1985)
- Sheree (1989)
- Miss My Love (1993)

=== Extended plays ===
- Jeacocke (1995)

=== Singles ===
As Sheree Jeacocke

- "Maybe You've Gotta Hurt" (1982)
- "You Get to Me" (1985)
- "Before We Fall" (1989)
- "Woman's Work" (1989)
- "Bang On" (1989)
- "Best Guy" (1990)
- "Serious" (1993)
- "Miss My Love" (1993)
- "Mr. Big Stuff" (1995)

As J-Cock

- "First Time" (1995)
- "Sunshine of My Life" (1996)
- "Come Together" (1997)

As Deeva

- "We Will Rock You" (1996)

== Accolades ==
=== Juno Awards ===
Year	Nominee / work	Award	Result
1986	Sheree Jeacocke	Most Promising Female Vocalist of the Year	Nominated
