= The Limit (group) =

Dutch musical group

- Origin: Netherlands
- Genres: Synth-pop, funk, post-disco
- Years active: 1980–1986
- Labels: TTR, Ariola, Arista, Portrait
- Past members: Bernard Oattes; Rob van Schaik

Oattes Van Schaik (formerly known as The Limit) was a 1980s musical group composed of Dutch producers Bernard Oattes and Rob van Schaik. In 1982, they released the songs "Crimes of Passion" and "She's So Divine" which was edited by Ben Liebrand. In 1985, they released a full-length album, which yielded the hit "Say Yeah" (featuring vocals by Gwen Guthrie). The song peaked at No. 17 on the UK Singles Chart and at No. 7 on the U.S. Billboard Dance/Club Play chart. The duo also wrote and produced for other artists as The Limit Productions such as Centerfold and Five Star with the hit single "Love Take Over".

After 1986, Bernard Oattes pursued a solo career, and went on to produce three studio albums. According to his website, Bernard Oattes is Holland's favourite English voiceover artist. Rob van Schaik continues to write material for other artists and has also remixed several tracks.

== Discography ==
=== Albums ===
Year	Album	Label	Format
1985	The Limit (issued as Love Attaxx in some markets)	Portrait	LP, CD

=== Singles ===
Year	Single	Label	Peak chart positions		
Year	Single	Label	US Dance	US R&B	UK
1980	"Photomania"	FFR	—	—	—
1982	"Crimes of Passion"	Ariola	—	—	—
1982	"She's So Divine"	Arista	17	44	—
1984	"Say Yeah"	Portrait	7	81	17
1985	"Miracles"	Portrait	—	—	—
1985	"Love Attaxx"	Portrait	—	—	—
1985	"Crimes of Passion (Remix)"	Portrait	—	—	—
"—" denotes releases that did not chart or were not released in that territory.
