= Tiny Tina and Little John =

Studio album by Tina Arena and John Bowles
- Released: 1977
- Studio: A studio in Melbourne
- Genre: Pop
- Label: Pisces
- Producer: Ross Burton; Russel Stubbings

Tina Arena chronology
Tiny Tina and Little John (1977)	Strong as Steel (1990)

Tiny Tina and Little John is the debut studio album by Australian singers Tina Arena and John Bowles. It was issued on Compact Disc and digitally in June 1998.

Arena's music career resumed in 1990 with her second album Strong as Steel, and she has had several charting albums and singles worldwide in the years since. Bowles has not released any further charting material.

== Track listing ==
Side one

1. "Rock & Roll Love Letter" – Tina Arena
2. "Ring Ring" – Tina Arena
3. "Do Ron Ron" – Tina Arena
4. "High Hopes" – Johnny Bowles
5. "Ma (He's Making Eyes at Me)" – Tina Arena
6. "Let Your Love Flow" – Johnny Bowles
7. "Somewhere Over the Rainbow" – Tina Arena
8. "Jeans On" – Tina Arena & Johnny Bowles

Side two

1. "Heartbeat (It's a Love Beat)" – Tina Arena
2. "Calendar Girl" – Johnny Bowles
3. "That's Rock 'N' Roll" – Tina Arena
4. "Anything You Can Do" – Tina Arena
5. "I'm Your Little Boy" – Johnny Bowles
6. "When I Kissed the Teacher" – Tina Arena
7. "Ben" – Johnny Bowles
8. "Everybody Needs a Rainbow/Everything Is Beautiful" – Tina Arena

== Certifications ==
Certifications for Tiny Tina and Little John
Region	Certification	Certified units/sales
Australia (ARIA)	Gold	20,000^{^}
^{^} Shipments figures based on certification alone.
