= Hot Love (Five Star song) =

Single by Five Star

from the album Five Star
- Released: 3 June 1990
- Genre: Pop
- Length: 3:32
- Label: Epic, Tent
- Songwriter(s): Doris Pearson, Delroy Pearson
- Producer(s): Buster Pearson, Five Star, John Barnes

Five Star singles chronology
| "Treat Me Like a Lady" (1990) | "Hot Love" (1990) | "Shine" (1991) |

"Hot Love" is a 1990 single by British pop group Five Star, the second release for their new record label, Epic. Peaking at #68, this track would be the group's last appearance in the UK Top 75 to date.

The group recorded the single in their new hi-tech studio that was built in the grounds of their family home, Stone Court, in Ascot, Berkshire. The single proved a flop, and the press were quick to pounce, claiming Five Star's career was rapidly fading. After the single's release, the album Five Star, was shelved by Epic, and merited only a U.S. release, although the album was made available in Britain on import towards the end of 1990. After a third single, "Shine" (released in 1991) failed to chart, the band left Epic and pursued a career in the United States.

The video to the single was hardly shown on British TV. The video was shot in a mock coffee shop called "Joe's Bar", in which the band performed a dance routine.

The group did promote the song on TV, appearing on the Terry Wogan chat show with a dance routine.

== Track listings ==
7" single, 7" postcard pack and cassette single:

1. Hot Love
2. Act One

12" single:

1. Hot Love (Extended Version)
2. Hot Love (Full Rub)

UK promo 12" single: [feat. Miss D]

1. Hot Love (Full Rub) 5:56
2. Hot Love (Instrumental) 5:14
3. Hot Love (Bonus Rub) 5:30

CD single:

1. Hot Love
2. Hot Love (Extended Version)
3. Act One

3" CD single:

1. Hot Love (Extended Version)
2. Hot Love (Full Rub)

All tracks available on the remastered version of the 2013 'Five Star' album.
