= Five Star (album) =

Studio album by Five Star
- Released: 1 August 1990
- Recorded: 1990
- Genre: Pop
- Length: 43:41
- Labels: Epic, Tent
- Producers: Buster Pearson, John Barnes, Five Star

Five Star chronology
Greatest Hits (1989)	Five Star (1990)	Shine (1991)

Singles from Five Star
- 1. "Treat Me Like a Lady" Released: February 1990; 2. "Hot Love" Released: June 1990

Five Star is the self-titled fifth studio album by the British pop group Five Star, released in 1990. The album, which was their first for Epic Records, was not a commercial success and failed to chart in the UK after the two lead singles, "Treat Me Like a Lady" and "Hot Love", both failed to make the UK Top 40. Unlike their previous albums, this album was written entirely by the band themselves with no outside writers (see track listing for credits).

This is the first Five Star album to not have fun facts about the Pearson family in its' vinyl liner notes.

The Japanese edition of the album has an extended mix of the single "Hot Love". A 2-disc Deluxe Edition of the album was released in the UK by Cherry Pop Records in 2013.

== Track listing ==
1. "Treat Me Like a Lady" - US radio remix (Doris Pearson, Delroy Pearson) - 4:19
2. "Hot Love" (Doris Pearson, Delroy Pearson) - 3:30
3. "I Can Show You Love" (Lorraine Pearson) - 4:21
4. "Feelings" (Doris Pearson, Stedman Pearson) - 4:26
5. "Feel Much Better" (Denise Pearson) - 4:19
6. "I'm Still Waiting" (Denise Pearson) - 4:57
7. "That's the Way I Like It" (Lorraine Pearson, Doris Pearson, Delroy Pearson) - 4:29
8. "Lost in You" (Doris Pearson, Delroy Pearson) - 3:42
9. "Tienes Mi Amour" (Denise Pearson) - 4:33
10. "What About Me Baby?" (Denise Pearson) - 4:51

== 2013 CD bonus tracks ==
1. "Don't Stop"
2. "Act One" (7 inch version)
3. "Treat Me Like A Lady" (Tough mix)
4. "Hot Love" (Full Rub 12 inch)
5. "Treat Me Like A Lady" (7 inch version)
6. "Treat Me Like A Lady" (extended version)
7. "Treat Me Like A Lady" (Dub Lady)
8. "Treat Me Like A Lady" (Tough dub)
9. "Treat Me Like A Lady" (Shep Pettibone's U.S. extended mix)
10. "Treat Me Like A Lady" (Shep Pettibone's I'll Be Yours Tonite dub)
11. "Treat Me Like A Lady" (Shep Pettibone's Raw mix)
12. "Treat Me Like A Lady" (Shep Pettibone's I Can Make You Feel dub)
13. "Treat Me Like A Lady" (Raw 7 inch version)
14. "Treat Me Like A Lady" (U.S. radio version)
15. "Hot Love" (extended mix)
16. "Hot Love" (instrumental)
17. "Hot Love" (bonus rub)
