= Treat Me Like a Lady (Five Star song) =

"Treat Me Like A Lady"

Single by Five Star

from the album Five Star
- B-side: "Don't Stop"
- Released: 2 March 1990
- Genre: Pop, New Jack Swing
- Length: 4:10
- Label: Epic, Tent
- Songwriter(s): Doris Pearson, Delroy Pearson
- Producer(s): Buster Pearson, Five Star, John Barnes

Five Star singles chronology
"With Every Heartbeat" (1989)	"Treat Me Like A Lady" (1990)	"Hot Love" (1990)

"Treat Me Like A Lady" is the name of a 1990 single by the British pop group Five Star. It was their first single for their new record label, Epic.

The group recorded the single in their new high-tech studio (reportedly costing £2.5 million), that was built in the grounds of their family home, Stone Court, in Ascot, Berkshire. However, the single wasn't a commercial success and only reached #54 in the UK & No.130 Australia.

7" single and 7" postcard pack:

1. Treat Me Like A Lady (UK Single Mix) 4:10

2. Don't Stop

12" single and cassette single:

1. Treat Me Like A Lady (UK Extended Version) 5:24

2. Treat Me Like A Lady (Dub Lady)

3. Don't Stop

2nd 12" single:

1. Treat Me Like A Lady (Tough Mix) 5:26

2. Treat Me Like A Lady (Tough Dub)

CD single: Tent FIVE1 / Tent 655641

1. Treat Me Like A Lady (UK Single Mix)

2. Treat Me Like A Lady (UK Extended Version) 5:24

3. Treat Me Like A Lady (Dub Lady)

4. Don't Stop

US 12" single: 49733

1. Treat Me Like A Lady (Extended Mix – US version) 7:26

2. Treat Me Like A Lady (I'll Be Yours Tonite Dub) 6:11

3. Treat Me Like A Lady (Raw Mix) 6:22

2. Treat Me Like A Lady (I Can Make You Feel Dub) 4:53

US CD promo: ESK73394

1. Treat Me Like A Lady (US 7" mix) 4:19 – released on "Five Star" album

2. Treat Me Like A Lady (Raw 7") 4:20

3. Treat Me Like A Lady (Extended Mix – US version) 7:26

4. Treat Me Like A Lady (Radio Edit) 4:37

All tracks available on the remastered version of the 2013 'Five Star' album.
