= Eclipse (Five Star album) =

Studio album by Five Star
- Released: 12 June 2001
- Recorded: 1994–2000
- Genre: Pop
- Length: 45:57
- Label: Tent
- Producer: Buster Pearson

Five Star chronology
Heart and Soul (1994)	Eclipse (2001)	The Greatest Hits (2003)

Eclipse is the eighth and final studio album by the British pop group Five Star. The album released in 2001 via the internet through the group's fan club; run by their father and then-manager, Buster Pearson. The CD was a professionally printed disc, with CD booklet including sleeve notes and track information. The art work was designed by Pearson.

Due to the fact that Doris and Delroy Pearson no longer wanted to perform with the group; the album was never properly "completed" and only released at the insistence of their father and manager Buster Pearson. The band promoted the album as a trio of Stedman, Deniece and Lorraine; although Doris and Delroy contributed to the album's sessions.

Much of the album's tracks are remixes from the group's 1994 album, "Heart and Soul".

Only one single was issued from the album, "Funktafied", which, like the album, was available to purchase only through the group's fan club.

== Track listing ==
1. "I Wish Me You"
2. "Hung Up"
3. "Eyes Don't Lie"
4. "I Get Such a High"
5. "The Writing on the Wall" (remix) - from Heart & Soul
6. "Got a Lot of Love" (remix) - from Heart & Soul
7. "Don't Let Me Be the Lonely One"
8. "Surely" (remix) - from Heart & Soul
9. "I Love You (For Sentimental Reasons)" (no rap) - from Heart & Soul
10. "Funktafied" (released as a single)
11. "One Way Mirror" [ Lead vocals Doris Pearson ]
12. "Tell Me What You Want"
13. "Get a Life Together" [ Lead vocals Doris Pearson ]
14. "I Give You Give" (remix) - from Heart & Soul
