= Rock the World (Five Star album) =

Studio album by Five Star
- Released: 15 August 1988
- Recorded: 1988
- Genre: Pop
- Length: 43:50
- Label: RCA/BMG, Tent
- Producer: Buster Pearson; Leon Sylvers III

Five Star chronology
Between the Lines (1987)	Rock the World (1988)	Greatest Hits (1989)

Singles from Rock the World
- 1. "Another Weekend" Released: May 1988; 2. "Rock My World" Released: July 1988; 3. "Someone's in Love" Released: September 1988 (US only); 4. "There's a Brand New World" Released: September 1988; 5. "Let Me Be Yours" Released: November 1988

Rock the World is an album by the British pop group Five Star. Their fourth album, it was released in 1988 and reached #17 on the UK charts. It was the group's last album of original material to chart in the UK, although two greatest hits compilations would chart in 1989 and 2019 respectively.

== Release and commercial performance ==
Two singles from the album were UK Top 30 hits: "Another Weekend" and "Rock My World". Two further singles from the album, "There's a Brand New World" and "Let Me Be Yours", failed to reach the Top 40. Following its release, the album was awarded a Silver disc for selling more than 60,000 copies in the UK. "There's a Brand New World" reached numer 61 at UK Singles chart (OCC).

The group adopted a new image for the release of the album, mimicking the leather-clad look from Michael Jackson's "Bad", released the previous year.

An expanded version of Rock the World was released by Cherry Pop Records in April 2012.

== Track listing ==
1. "Another Weekend" (Leon Sylvers III) – 5:21
2. "Rock My World" (Leon Sylvers III) – 4:12
3. "Godsend" (Simon Climie, Rob Fisher, Dennis Morgan) – 4:17
4. "Are You Really the One" (Lionel Job, Clifford Dawson, William Hagans) – 4:05
5. "Let Me Be Yours" (Deniece Pearson) – 4:11
6. "Free Time" (Leon Sylvers III) – 4:46
7. "Physical Attraction" (Jerry Knight, Aaron Zigman) – 3:55
8. "Someone's in Love" (Doris Pearson, Delroy Pearson) – 4:23 (US edition 4:08 radio remix) *
9. "There's a Brand New World" (Deniece Pearson) – 3:49
10. "Rescue Me" (Leon Sylvers III) – 4:19
11. "Another Weekend" (Friday night mix) – 6:28 (not on LP)
12. "Rock My World" (Extra terrestrial mix) – 6:39 (not on LP)

* For the US edition (cat 8531-2-R) the track "Someone's in Love" was replaced by the 4:08 7" radio remix version of the song,
even though the disc label was still printed with the UK version timing of 4:23.

== 2012 CD bonus tracks ==
1. "Another Weekend" (Saturday night mix)
2. "Rock My World" (Extra terrestrial dub)
3. "There's a Brand New World" (12" version)
4. "Let Me Be Yours "(12" remix)
5. "Someone's in Love" (David Morales US 7" radio mix)
6. "With Every Heartbeat" (7" mix)
7. "Something About My Baby"
