= Doug Brady =

American baseball player

- Second baseman
- Born: Jacksonville, Illinois, U.S.
- Batted: Switch Threw: Right

MLB debut
- September 5, 1995, for the Chicago White Sox

Last MLB appearance
- October 1, 1995, for the Chicago White Sox

MLB statistics
- Batting average: .190
- Runs: 4
- Hits: 4

KBO statistics
- Batting average: .258
- Home runs: 3
- Runs batted in: 6
- Stats at Baseball Reference

Teams
- Chicago White Sox (1995); Lotte Giants (1998)

Stephen Douglas Brady is an American former professional baseball second baseman. He played one season in Major League Baseball (MLB) for the Chicago White Sox, and one season in the Korea Baseball Organization for the Lotte Giants.

He was drafted by the White Sox in the 12th round of the 1991 amateur draft. Brady played his first professional season with their Class-A (Short Season) Utica Blue Sox in 1991, and his last affiliated season with the White Sox's Triple-A Nashville Sounds in 1997. In 1998, he played for Lotte in the KBO.
