= With Every Heartbeat (Five Star song) =

Single by Five Star

from the album Greatest Hits
- B-side: "Sound Sweet"
- Released: 8 April 1989
- Genre: Pop
- Length: 4:11
- Label: RCA, Tent
- Songwriter: Wayne Brathwaite
- Producer: Wayne Brathwaite

Five Star singles chronology
"Let Me Be Yours" (1989)	"With Every Heartbeat" (1989)	"Treat Me Like a Lady" (1990)

"With Every Heartbeat" is a 1989 single by the British pop group Five Star. It was their last single for RCA, the label they signed with in 1983. It reached #49 on the UK charts.

The song never appeared on a studio album, but was included on the group's Greatest Hits album, released later in 1989.

== Track listing ==
7" single and 7" gatefold

1. With Every Heartbeat (7")
2. Sound Sweet

Cassette single

1. With Every Heartbeat (7")
2. Let Me Be Yours (12" Mix)
3. The Five Star Hit Mix, 11:52 (Disco Mix Club megamix featuring Can't Wait Another Minute, Let Me Be The One, All Fall Down, Whenever You're Ready, Find the Time, If I Say Yes, R.S.V.P., Love Take Over, The Slightest Touch)

12" single

1. With Every Heartbeat (12" Mix)
2. Sound Sweet
3. Let Me Be Yours (12" Mix / Remix)

CD single

1. With Every Heartbeat (7")
2. Let Me Be Yours (12" Mix / Remix)
3. Sound Sweet
4. With Every Heartbeat (Dub)

All tracks available on the remastered versions of either the 2012 'Rock The World' album, the 2013 'The Remix Anthology (The Remixes 1984–1991)' or the 2018 'Luxury – The Definitive Anthology 1984-1991' boxset.

== Chart performance ==
Chart (1989)	Peak position
UK Singles (OCC)	49
