= Between the Lines (Five Star album) =

Studio album by Five Star
- Released: 14 September 1987
- Recorded: 1987
- Genre: Pop
- Length: 44:51
- Label: RCA; Tent
- Producer: Dennis Lambert (tracks 1–4); Buster Pearson (tracks 5 and 8–10); Richard James Burgess (tracks 6 and 7); Deniece Pearson (tracks 5 and 10); Lorraine Pearson (track 8); Delroy Pearson (track 9); Doris Pearson (track 9); Shep Pettibone (additional production; track 9)

Five Star chronology
Silk & Steel (1986)	Between the Lines (1987)	Rock the World (1988)

Singles from Between the Lines
- 1. "Whenever You're Ready" Released: August 1987; 2. "Strong as Steel" Released: September 1987; 3. "Somewhere Somebody" Released: November 1987

Between the Lines is the third album by the British pop group Five Star, released in September 1987. The album peaked at number 7 in the UK.

Between the Lines was recorded in early 1987. The opening four tracks were recorded in Los Angeles with the producer Dennis Lambert. Two more tracks were recorded there with Richard James Burgess, who had produced tracks on their previous album. The rest of the album was made up of songs written by the band members with the writers producing their own tracks with their father, Buster Pearson, in London. Deniece sings lead on all tracks except "You Should Have Waited" (sung by Lorraine) and "Knock Twice" (sung by Doris).

The album did not sell as well as its predecessor, Silk & Steel, and spent only two weeks in the top 10, and 17 weeks on the UK Albums Chart altogether. However, the album was certified Platinum for sales of over 300,000 copies by summer 1988. It did not chart at all in the US.

The first single, "Whenever You're Ready", was released a month prior to the album in the UK and peaked at number 11 in the UK Singles Chart but only managed to reach number 39 on the US Hot R&B Singles chart, missing the Billboard Hot 100. The ballad "Strong as Steel", written by Diane Warren, was the second single but fared even worse, peaking at number 16 in the UK in October and not charting at all in the US. When the third UK single, "Somewhere Somebody", failed to reach the top 20 in December of that year (peaking at #23), promotion of the album ended with no further singles released (there had been seven and six UK singles from their first two albums respectively). Having released a single every two to four months since 1985, the band released no new material for six months and subsequently changed their image for their next album.

An expanded version of Between the Lines was released by Cherry Pop Records in April 2012.

== Track listing ==
1. "Somewhere Somebody" (Dean Chamberlain, Martin Briley) - 4:14
2. "Whenever You're Ready" (Lionel Job, Cliff Dawson, Bill Hagans) - 4:21
3. "Strong as Steel" (Diane Warren) - 5:21
4. "Read Between the Lines" (Marti Sharron, Clif Magness) - 4:50
5. "Live Giving Love" (Deniece Pearson) - 5:03
6. "Ain't Watcha Do" (Scott Cutler, Jeff Hull, Amy Sky) - 3:40
7. "Made Out of Love" (Joey Gallo, Wardell Potts, Pamela Phillips Oland) - 4:27
8. "You Should Have Waited" (Lorraine Pearson) - 3:35
9. "Knock Twice" (Delroy Pearson, Doris Pearson) - 4:11
10. "Hard Race" (Deniece Pearson) - 4:25

=== 2012 CD reissue bonus tracks ===
1. "Whenever You're Ready" (The New York mix)
2. "Somewhere Somebody" (The Pettibone remix)
3. "How Dare You (Stay Out Of My Life)"
4. "The Five Star Hit Mix" (including "Can't Wait Another Minute", "Let Me Be The One", "All Fall Down", "Whenever You're Ready", "Find The Time", "If I Say Yes", "R.S.V.P.", "Love Take Over", "The Slightest Touch")

== Charts ==
=== Weekly charts ===
Weekly chart performance for Between the Lines
Chart (1987)	Peak position
Dutch Albums (Album Top 100)	22
European Albums (Music & Media)	32
Finnish Albums (Suomen virallinen lista)	32
New Zealand Albums (RMNZ)	35
Swedish Albums (Sverigetopplistan)	16
Swiss Albums (Schweizer Hitparade)	27
UK Albums (OCC)	7

=== Year-end charts ===
Year-end chart performance for Between the Lines
Chart (1987)	Position
UK Albums (Gallup)	64

== Certifications ==
Certifications for Between the Lines
Region	Certification	Certified units/sales
United Kingdom (BPI)	Platinum	300,000^{^}
^{^} Shipments figures based on certification alone.
