= Luxury of Life =

Studio album by Five Star
- Released: 22 July 1985
- Recorded: 1984−1985
- Genre: R&B, dance-pop, soul
- Length: 45:49
- Label: RCA, Tent
- Producer: Nick Martinelli, Steve Harvey, Billy Livsey, The Limit, Richard Hewson

Five Star chronology
Luxury of Life (1985)	Silk & Steel (1986)

Singles from Luxury of Life
- 1. "Hide and Seek" Released: May 1984; 2. "Crazy" Released: October 1984; 3. "All Fall Down" Released: April 1985; 4. "Let Me Be the One" Released: July 1985; 5. "Love Take Over" Released: September 1985; 6. "R.S.V.P." Released: November 1985; 7. "System Addict" Released: December 1985

Luxury of Life is the debut album by the British pop group Five Star. Though not a great success when it was first released in the summer of 1985, the album eventually peaked at number 12 in early 1986, and spent a total of 70 weeks in the UK Albums Chart. It was certified Platinum in October 1986 for sales of over 300,000 copies in the UK. It also charted in the United States, peaking at number 57 on the Billboard 200 and 14 on the R&B Albums chart.

The album has a number of different contributors. Most of the tracks were produced either in Philadelphia by Nick Martinelli with members of Loose Ends or in London by Steve Harvey. Exceptions include the singles "Love Take Over", which was written and produced by the Dutch duo The Limit and mixed by Paul Hardcastle, and "System Addict", produced by its co-writer Billy Livsey.

Seven of the tracks were released as singles in the UK. Four became top 30 hit singles including the top 3 hit "System Addict". In the US, all three singles released made the R&B top 20 including "Let Me Be The One" which reached number 2.

Luxury of Life was re-released by Cherry Pop Records in November 2010 with bonus tracks.

== Track listing ==
1. "Love Take Over" (Bernard Oattes, Rob van Schaik) – 3:57
2. "All Fall Down" (Barry Blue, Robin Smith) – 3:34
3. "Let Me Be the One" (Ian Foster) – 4:42
4. "System Addict" (Billy Livsey, Gary Bell) – 4:00
5. "Hide and Seek" (Gary Bell, Anne Dudley) – 5:30
6. "R.S.V.P." (Paul Gurvitz) – 4:37
7. "Now I'm in Control" (Mick Leeson, Peter Vale, Steve Jeffreys) – 3:42
8. "Say Goodbye" (Lorraine Pearson) – 4:14
9. "Crazy" (Gary Bell) – 3:57
10. "Winning" (Gary Bell) – 3:58

=== 2010 CD reissue bonus tracks ===
1. "All Fall Down" (M&M remix)
2. "Let Me Be The One" (Philadelphia remix)
3. "Love Takes Over" (The Limit Edition mix)
4. "R.S.V.P." (Urban remix)
5. "System Addict" (M&M remix)
6. "Love Games" (B-side)

== Charts ==
=== Weekly charts ===
Weekly chart performance for Luxury of Life
Chart (1985–1986)	Peak position
Dutch Albums (Album Top 100)	25
European Albums (Music & Media)	51
New Zealand Albums (RMNZ)	24
UK Albums (OCC)	12
US Billboard 200	57
US Top R&B/Hip-Hop Albums (Billboard)	14

=== Year-end charts ===
1985 year-end chart performance for Luxury of Life
Chart (1985)	Position
Dutch Albums (Album Top 100)	91

1986 year-end chart performance for Luxury of Life
Chart (1986)	Position
UK Albums (Gallup)	45
US Billboard 200	75
US Top R&B/Hip-Hop Albums (Billboard)	25

== Certifications ==
Certifications for Luxury of Life
Region	Certification	Certified units/sales
United Kingdom (BPI)	Platinum	300,000^{^}
^{^} Shipments figures based on certification alone.
