= Shine (Five Star album) =

Studio album by Five Star
- Released: December 1991
- Recorded: 1990–1991
- Genre: Pop
- Length: 48:23
- Label: Epic, Tent
- Producer: Buster Pearson, Ian Prince, Five Star, Michael Jay

Five Star chronology
Five Star (1990)	Shine (1991)	Heart and Soul (1994)

Shine is the sixth studio album by the British pop group Five Star. The album was released in 1991 in the US only, where sales were poor. The album was made available as an import in the UK, though the album's [title trac was released as a single in the UK but failed to chart. A special edition of the album was released in the UK in 2013 by Cherry Pop Records, featuring six additional mixes of the title track single.

Producers on the album included Ian Prince, Zac Harmon and Christopher Troy. The album was part-recorded at MJJ Studios in California, owned by Michael Jackson.

Initially, the tracks recorded for this album were to form the basis for lead singer Denise Pearson's first solo album (at this point she had changed the spelling from Deniece to Denise). However, the rest of the band later contributed to the album, thus making it a group effort.

The album was rated 2 out of 5 stars by AllMusic.

== Release ==
"Shine" is a single released on 14 October 1991. It was the band's third consecutive single with Epic Record. It reached No. 88 in UK charts and No. 53 on UK Dance (Music Week). The group performed the track on Sky TV and did some promotional work for the single and album in the UK. Five Star were then dropped by the company and would not release another single for the next four years.

== Track listing ==
1. "Shine"
2. "Come To Me (For Love)"
3. "Some Kind Of Magic"
4. "Love Can't Wait"
5. "The Love You Bring To Me"
6. "Right Over"
7. "The Start Of Forever"
8. "I Really Did It This Time"
9. "Sentimental"
10. "Save A Place In Your Heart For Me"

== 2013 CD bonus tracks ==
1. Shine (New Jack Mix Edit)
2. Shine (Glamour Rap Mix featuring Def)
3. Shine (Slick Hop Extended Mix)
4. Shine (New Jack Mix Ft Def Jef)
5. Shine (The Glamour Mix)
6. Shine (Slick Hop/Boom Mix)
