= Somewhere Somebody =

Single by Five Star

from the album Between The Lines
- B-side: "Have A Good Time"
- Released: 23 November 1987
- Genre: Pop
- Length: 3:39
- Label: RCA, Tent
- Songwriters: Dean Chamberlain, Martin Briley
- Producer: Dennis Lambert

Five Star singles chronology
"Strong as Steel" (1987)	"Somewhere Somebody" (1987)	"Another Weekend" (1988)

"Somewhere Somebody" is the name of a 1987 hit single by British pop group Five Star. It was the third release from their third album, Between The Lines.

No promotional video was made to accompany this single as the band were too busy with the "Children Of The Night Tour". The live performance of the song became its 'official' video.

The song's chart position of #23 became the group's lowest charting UK Top 40 single since "Love Take Over" in 1985.

== Track listings ==
7” Single, 7" Advent Calendar and 7" shaped picture disc

1. Somewhere Somebody
2. Have a Good Time

12” Single, 12" posterbag and 12" tour gatefold

1. Somewhere Somebody (The Pettibone Remix)
2. Somewhere Somebody (Dub Beats)
3. Somewhere Somebody (Short Version - The Pettibone Remix)
4. Have A Good Time

UK promo 12” Single

1. Somewhere Somebody (The Pettibone Remix)
2. Somewhere Somebody (Dub Remix)**
3. Somewhere Somebody (Dub Beats)

All tracks available on the remastered versions of either the 2012 'Between The Lines' album, the 2013 'The Remix Anthology (The Remixes 1984-1991)' or the 2018 'Luxury - The Definitive Anthology 1984-1991' boxset EXCEPT ** Somewhere Somebody (Dub Remix)

== Charts ==
Chart (1987–88)	Position
Netherlands (Single Top 100)	35
UK Singles (OCC)	23
