= Lou Pomanti =

Canadian musician

- Born: Toronto, Ontario, Canada
- Origin: Toronto, Ontario, Canada
- Genres: Jazz, funk, R&B, pop
- Occupations: Composer, producer, keyboardist, musical director, arranger
- Instruments: Piano, synthesizer, keyboard

Lou Pomanti is a Canadian composer, producer, keyboardist, musical director, and award-winning arranger, known for his work in jazz, pop, television and film, and for serving as musical director for major Canadian awards shows.

== Early life ==
Pomanti was born in Toronto and raised in the Weston neighborhood of Toronto. He began studying piano as a youth, completed studies at The Royal Conservatory of Music, and later attended Humber College’s jazz program.

== Career ==
In 1980 Pomanti joined David Clayton-Thomas on tour with Blood, Sweat & Tears and later produced Clayton-Thomas’s album "Soul Ballads". By the mid-1980s he was regularly engaged as a pianist, keyboardist, and arranger, contributing to recordings and performances by artists such as Anne Murray, Gordon Lightfoot, Triumph, Jeff Healey, Kim Mitchell and Marc Jordan.

Beginning in the 1990s Pomanti expanded into composing and arranging for television and film; his credits include work for CBC, CTV, Global and other networks, and he has served repeatedly as musical director for the Gemini Awards (now part of the Canadian Screen Awards), the Genie Awards, the Juno Awards and the Canadian Songwriters Hall of Fame ceremonies.

Pomanti arranged strings and horns on several Michael Bublé recordings (including work credited on Crazy Love) and has provided orchestral arrangements and production on many commercial recordings.

Pomanti leads the Toronto-based horn ensemble Oakland Stroke and continues to perform, arrange and produce; he also released the collaborative album Lou Pomanti & Friends (2022).

== Awards and honors ==
- 2007 Gemini Award (arranging/conducting) — Pomanti received a Gemini Award for his arrangement and conducting of Joni Mitchell’s "Both Sides Now" during her Canadian Songwriters Hall of Fame induction.
- 2007 Gemini Award nomination (Best Performance or Host in a Variety Program or Series) - with Michael Bublé for the song "How About You?" for the series "Words to Music: The Songwriters Hall of Fame"
- Multiple Gemini nominations and additional honors for his television and live-event work.
- In 2009, the City of Toronto approved naming a new street Lou Pomanti Street to honor his contributions to music. The street was subsequently listed in the official 2012 Toronto street index.
- He was the recipient of the 2023 Lifetime Achievement Award given by the Toronto Musicians Association.

== Discography ==
=== Albums ===
- Welcome to the Boogaloo Lounge (2011).
- Lou Pomanti & Friends (2022). Vesuvius Music.
- Butterfly (2024) — collaboration with Robyn Black.

=== Selected contributions ===
- Orchestration/arrangements on Michael Bublé's Crazy Love (selected tracks).
- Producer/arranger for David Clayton-Thomas (Soul Ballads).
