= Heart and Soul (Five Star album) =

Studio album by Five Star
- Released: 26 September 1994 (US); 20 November 1995 (UK)
- Recorded: 1994
- Genre: Pop
- Length: 47:45
- Label: Tent
- Producer: Buster Pearson

Five Star chronology
Shine (1991)	Heart and Soul (1994)	Eclipse (2001)

Heart and Soul is the seventh studio album by the British pop group Five Star. It was the group's first album for three years, released independently on their own label, Tent Records, first 26 September 1994 in the US, later on 10 November 1995 in the UK with a completely different artwork.

Three songs from the album were released as singles: "I Love You (For Sentimental Reasons)", "I Give You Give" (which reached #83 on the UK singles chart in October 1993), and "Surely". Promotional videos were produced for the first two singles; I Love You (For Sentimental Reasons) was directed by Malcolm-Jamal Warner. The album was commercially unsuccessful in both countries of release.

== Release ==
Five Stars released "Surely" in 1995 as a single taken from Heart and Soul. The single was a U.S. only release, available in the UK as an import. Although it missed the Billboard Hot 100 chart, it peaked at #125 in October of that year (see 1995 in music). The song includes a rap by Junior P. This was the first time Five Star had used a rapper on one of their songs.

== Track listing ==
1. "I Love You (For Sentimental Reasons)"
2. "Surely"
3. "Writing on the Wall"
4. "Got a Lot of Love"
5. "The Best of Me"
6. "When You Get Home"
7. "Going with the Moment"
8. "Secret From My Heart"
9. "Show Me"
10. "I Give You Give"
