= All Fall Down (Five Star song) =

Single by Five Star

from the album Luxury of Life
- B-side: "First Avenue"
- Released: 5 May 1985
- Genre: Pop
- Length: 4:00
- Label: RCA, Tent
- Songwriters: Barry Blue, Robin Smith
- Producer: Nick Martinelli

Five Star singles chronology
"Crazy" (1984)	"All Fall Down" (1985)	"Let Me Be the One" (1985)

"All Fall Down" is the name of a 1985 hit single by British pop group Five Star. The single was the third UK release from their first album Luxury of Life, released in June 1985. The single was written by Barry Blue and Robin Smith, themselves famous for writing songs for artists in the 1970s.

The video used a technique similar to that of A-ha's "Take On Me", with a rotoscope type clip.

The single became a breakthrough for Five Star, giving them their first Top 40 entry, peaking at #15. Their first three single releases had all failed to make the Top 100.

The song's b-side, "First Avenue", was an instrumental track written and co-produced by band member Deniece Pearson and credited to the Five Star Orchestra. It was nominated for a Grammy Award for Best R&B Instrumental Performance in 1986.

== Track listings ==
7" single:

1. All Fall Down
2. First Avenue

12" single: PT40040

1. All Fall Down (5:30 Extended Version)
2. All Fall Down (Instrumental)
3. First Avenue

2nd 12" single: PT40040R

1. All Fall Down (M&M Remix) 08:24
2. All Fall Down (Instrumental)
3. First Avenue

All tracks available on the remastered versions of either the 2010 'Luxury Of Life' album, the 2013 'The Remix Anthology (The Remixes 1984-1991)' or the 2018 'Luxury - The Definitive Anthology 1984-1991' boxset.
