= Let Me Be the One (Five Star song) =

1985 single by Five Star

"Let Me Be The One"

Single by Five Star

from the album Luxury of Life
- B-side: "Beat 47"
- Released: 8 July 1985
- Genre: R&B; soul; pop; funk; dance-pop
- Length: 4:41 (album version); 3:38 (7" single version)
- Label: RCA, Tent
- Songwriter: Ian Foster
- Producer: Nick Martinelli

Five Star singles chronology
"All Fall Down" (1985)	"Let Me Be The One" (1985)	"Love Take Over" (1985)

"Let Me Be The One" is the name of a 1985 hit single by British pop group Five Star, and was the fourth release from their debut album Luxury of Life, released in the summer of 1985. "Let Me Be The One" was the group's second UK Top 20 single of the year, reaching #18. It also reached #2 on the U.S. R&B Billboard chart.

The song was later covered by American singer Mandy Moore in 1999 for her debut album.

== Track listings ==
7" single: PB 40193

1. Let Me Be The One (Edit – 3:38)

2. Beat 47

12" single: PT40194

1. Let Me Be The One (Album Version – 4:41)

2. All Fall Down (M&M Dub Remix)

3. Beat 47

2nd 12" single: PT40194R

1. Let Me Be The One (Philadelphia Remix) 6:06

2. Let Me Be The One (Long Hot Soulful Summer Mix)

3. All Fall Down (M&M Dub Remix)

4. Beat 47

3rd 12" single: PT40194RR

1. Let Me Be The One (Philadelphia Remix) 6:06

2. Let Me Be The One (Dance Mix By Hard Rock)

3. All Fall Down (M&M Dub Remix)

4. Beat 47

U.S. 7" single: PB 14229 (alternative cover)

1. Let Me Be The One (Edit – 3:38)

2. Let Me Be The One (Edited Philadelphia Remix – 3:59)

U.S. 12" single: PW 14230 (alternative cover)

1. Let Me Be The One (Philadelphia Remix) 6:06

2. Let Me Be The One (LP Version) 4:41

3. Let Me Be The One (Long Hot Soulful Summer Mix)

4. Beat 47

All tracks available on the remastered versions of either the 2010 'Luxury Of Life' album, the 2013 'The Remix Anthology (The Remixes 1984-1991)' or the 2018 'Luxury - The Definitive Anthology 1984-1991' boxset.

== Let Me Be the 1 ==
"Let Me Be The 1"

Single by Five Star
- Released: 19 July 2020
- Genre: Pop
- Length: 3:08
- Label: Viision Entertainment
- Songwriter: Ian Foster
- Producer: Delroy Pearson

Five Star singles chronology
"System Addict 2005" (2005)	"Let Me Be The 1" (2020)

In July 2020, a new version of the song, now styled "Let Me Be The 1", was released via Delroy Pearson of the group (credited as Viision featuring 5 Star). Lorraine sings the first verse and the second verse is sung by Doris. Lorraine, Doris, Stedman and Delroy recorded their vocals for the new version. Original lead singer Denise does not appear on this version as she has announced she no longer wants to be part of the Five Star line-up. This version is slightly shorter than the original, at 3:08.

The track peaked at #33 on the iTunes top 200 pop chart.
