= Whenever You're Ready (Five Star song) =

1987 single by Five Star

Single by Five Star

from the album Between the Lines
- B-side: "Forever Yours"
- Released: 3 August 1987
- Length: 4:22
- Label: RCA, Tent
- Songwriters: Lionel Job, Cliff Dawson, Bill Hagans
- Producer: Dennis Lambert

Five Star singles chronology
"Are You Man Enough" (1987)	"Whenever You're Ready" (1987)	"Strong as Steel" (1987)

"Whenever You're Ready" is a song by British pop music group Five Star, released as the first single from their third album, Between the Lines. The single peaked at number 11 on the UK Singles Chart.

== Track listings ==
7-inch single

A. "Whenever You're Ready"
B. "Forever Yours"

12-inch and cassette single:

1. "Whenever You're Ready" (The New York mix)
2. "Whenever You're Ready" (Crazy Dub Jammy)
3. "Are You Man Enough?" (Shep Pettibone remix)
4. "Forever Yours"

== Charts ==
Chart (1987)	Peak position
Belgium (Ultratop 50 Flanders)	31
Europe (European Hot 100 Singles)	49
Ireland (IRMA)	2
Netherlands (Dutch Top 40)	18
Netherlands (Single Top 100)	22
Switzerland (Schweizer Hitparade)	23
UK Singles (OCC)	11
US Hot Black Singles (Billboard)	39
