= R.S.V.P. (Five Star song) =

Single by Five Star

from the album Luxury of Life
- B-side: "Say Goodbye"
- Released: 9 November 1985
- Genre: Pop
- Length: 4:45
- Label: RCA, Tent
- Songwriter: Paul Gurvitz
- Producer: Nick Martinelli

Five Star singles chronology
"Love Take Over" (1985)	"R.S.V.P." (1985)	"System Addict" (1985)

"R.S.V.P." is the name of a 1985 single by British pop group Five Star. The single was the sixth UK release from their debut album Luxury of Life, released in the summer of 1985. The single peaked at no.45 in the UK.

All tracks available on the remastered versions of either the 2010 'Luxury Of Life' album, the 2013 'The Remix Anthology (The Remixes 1984-1991)' or the 2018 'Luxury - The Definitive Anthology 1984-1991' boxset.

== Track listing ==
7" single: PB40445

1. R.S.V.P. (Edit – 3:28)
2. Say Goodbye

7" single Limited poster bag: PB40445

1. R.S.V.P. (Edit – 3:28)
2. Say Goodbye

+ bonus cassette (FSK001) of rare 12" versions of 'Hide And Seek' / 'Crazy'

12" single: PT40446

1. R.S.V.P. (Remix S’il Vous Plait)
2. R.S.V.P. (Original Philly Mix)
3. R.S.V.P. (Urban Remix)
4. Love Games
5. Say Goodbye
