= System Addict =

1985 single by Five Star

Single by Five Star

from the album Luxury of Life
- B-side: "Pure Energy"
- Released: 27 December 1985
- Genre: Pop
- Length: 4:00
- Label: RCA, Tent
- Songwriters: Billy Livsey, Gary Bell
- Producer: Billy Livsey

Five Star singles chronology
"R.S.V.P." (1985)	"System Addict" (1985)	"Can't Wait Another Minute" (1986)

"System Addict" is a song by the British pop group Five Star. It was released as the seventh and final single from their debut album, Luxury of Life (1985). It became the group's first top-10 hit, reaching number three on the UK Singles Chart in 1986. It was certified silver by the British Phonographic Industry (BPI) for sales in excess of 250,000 copies. The music video was directed by Sebastian Harris.

In 2005, "System Addict" was remixed and released by Sleazesisters. The video to the remixed single is an updated version of the 1985 original version, with more graphics added to make it look like someone was on a computer "updating" the video.

== Critical reception ==
Dave Rimmer of Smash Hits considered "System Addict" "a bit like vintage Shalamar" with "many worse things that come from Romford".

== Track listings ==
Some copies of the 7-inch single were issued with a free cassette of the 12-inch dub versions of "All Fall Down", "Love Take Over" and "System Addict". All tracks available on the remastered versions of either the 2010 'Luxury Of Life' album, the 2013 'The Remix Anthology (The Remixes 1984-1991)' or the 2018 'Luxury - The Definitive Anthology 1984-1991' boxset.

- 7-inch single
1. "System Addict"
2. "Pure Energy"
- 12-inch single
1. "System Addict" (M&M remix)
2. "System Addict" (dub remix)
3. "Pure Energy"
4. "Winning" (extended version)
- 2005 release
1. "System Addict" (Sleazesisters 2005 mix)
2. "System Addict" (Shanghai Surprise mix)
3. "Funktafied" (Re-Mixed by Leon Sylvers III)

== Charts ==
=== Weekly charts ===
Chart (1986)	Peak position
Australia (Kent Music Report)	66
Belgium (Ultratop 50 Flanders)	24
Europe (Eurochart Hot 100)	24
Ireland (IRMA)	8
New Zealand (Recorded Music NZ)	25
Switzerland (Schweizer Hitparade)	7
UK Singles (OCC)	3
West Germany (GfK)	19

=== Year-end charts ===
Chart (1986)	Position
UK Singles (OCC)	63

== Certifications ==
Region	Certification	Certified units/sales
United Kingdom (BPI)	Silver	250,000^{^}
^{^} Shipments figures based on certification alone.
