= Love Take Over =

Single by Five Star

from the album Luxury of Life
- B-side: "Keep in Touch"
- Released: 1 September 1985
- Genre: Pop
- Length: 3:48
- Label: RCA, Tent
- Songwriter: Bernard Oates, Rob Van Shaick
- Producers: Bernard Oates, Rob Van Shaick

Five Star singles chronology
"Let Me Be The One" (1985)	"Love Take Over" (1985)	"R.S.V.P." (1985)

"Love Take Over" is a 1985 hit single by British pop group Five Star. The single was written and produced by Rob Van Schaick and Bernard Oates (a.k.a. The Limit). "Love Take Over" was a UK Top 30 success, peaking at #25 and also at #9 in the Hot R&B/Hip-Hop Songs chart.

== Track listings ==
7" single and 7" picture disc:

1. Love Take Over

2. Keep in Touch

12" single: PT40354

1. Love Take Over (Extended Version) 6:06

2. Keep in Touch

3. Let Me Be The One (Instrumental Version) aka Long Hot Soulful Summer Mix

12" single: PT40354(R)

1. Love Take Over (The Limit Edition Mix) 6:20

2. Love Take Over (Dub Take Over) 7:03

3. Keep in Touch

4. Let Me Be The One (Instrumental Version) aka Long Hot Soulful Summer Mix

U.S. 12" single: JW-14324 (PW-14324)

1. Love Take Over (The Limit Edition Mix) 6:20

2. Love Take Over (The Limit Edition Mix – Edit) 4:29

3. Love Take Over (Dub Take Over) 7:03

All tracks available on the remastered versions of either the 2010 'Luxury Of Life' album, the 2013 'The Remix Anthology (The Remixes 1984-1991)' or the 2018 'Luxury - The Definitive Anthology 1984-1991' boxset.
