= Five Star =

British pop group

- Also known as: 5 Star
- Origin: Romford, Greater London, England
- Genres: R&B; pop; soul; disco; funk
- Years active: 1983–95; 2001–02; 2012–16
- Labels: Tent; RCA; Epic

Five Star (also styled as 5 Star) were a British pop group, formed in 1983 and comprising siblings Stedman, Lorraine, Denise, Doris, and Delroy Pearson. From 1985 to 1988, Five Star had four top-20 albums and 15 top-40 singles in the UK, including the top-10 hits "System Addict" (1986), "Can't Wait Another Minute" (1986), "Find the Time" (1986), "Rain or Shine" (1986), "Stay Out of My Life" (1987) and "The Slightest Touch" (1987). They won the 1987 Brit Award for Best British Group.

== Career ==
=== 1980s ===
The five-piece group of siblings from Romford were masterminded by their father and manager, Buster Pearson, who modelled them in the style of the Jackson 5. He was a former recording artist and session musician who had worked with Wilson Pickett and had set up Tent Records Ltd in 1982. Their debut single was released on Tent in 1983 and although it did not chart, it gave them TV exposure and a record deal with RCA Records (with future releases being joint Tent/RCA releases). After two unsuccessful singles in 1984, their chart breakthrough came in 1985 with the release of "All Fall Down" which peaked at No. 15 on the UK Singles Chart, and No. 65 on the Billboard Hot 100 in the US, where it also reached the top 20 (No. 16) on the Hot R&B Singles chart and the top 10 (No. 6) on the Hot Dance/Disco chart.

The group released their debut album, Luxury of Life, in June 1985. It included their last three singles and was followed by the single "Let Me Be the One" which was another UK Top 20 and US Hot 100 hit, also peaking at No. 2 on the US Hot R&B chart. After another two singles in the UK in 1985 which failed to reach the top 20, the group scored their first top 10 hit in early 1986 with "System Addict", the seventh UK single from their debut album. The single peaked at No. 3 in the UK, and was certified silver. Its success also led to increased sales of the album which peaked at No. 12 on the UK Albums Chart in February 1986, and would be certified platinum in the UK later in the year. Also in 1986, the instrumental track "First Avenue" (which had been released as the B-side of "All Fall Down") was nominated for a Grammy Award for Best R&B Instrumental Performance, and a remixed version of "Love Take Over" gave them another US Hot R&B top 10 hit (reaching No. 9).

Their first new material in 1986, the single "Can't Wait Another Minute", gave the group another top 10 hit on the UK Singles, US Hot R&B and US Hot Dance/Disco charts and also their highest-ever US Hot 100 peak, reaching No. 41. The song was used in the film Gung Ho. After another UK top 10 hit ("Find the Time"), the group released their second album, Silk and Steel, in August 1986. The album reached No. 1 and sold 1.2 million copies in the UK (being certified quadruple platinum by 1987). The single "Rain or Shine" gave the group their highest ever UK chart position, peaking at No. 2."If I Say Yes" (a UK top 20 hit) became their final entry on the US Hot 100.

In 1987, two further singles from Silk and Steel, "Stay Out of My Life" (penned by Denise) and "The Slightest Touch", made the UK top 10 with US-only single "Are You Man Enough?" (remixed by Shep Pettibone) making the US Hot R&B top 20. The group won the 1987 BRIT Award for Best British Group with Silk and Steel also nominated for Best British Album.

At the height of their success the family bought Stone Court, a large security-gated mansion in Berkshire (featuring a built-in recording studio) from former P.M. Dawn manager Nick Hemmings, in which they all lived and worked. They also owned a fleet of supercars, including Lamborghinis and Ferraris. Their affluent lifestyle was heavily publicised in the press and on television.

New single "Whenever You're Ready" narrowly missed the UK top 10 (peaking at No. 11) but its only placing in the US was No. 39 on the Hot R&B chart. August 1987 saw the release of their third album, Between the Lines, which reached No. 7 in the UK and was another platinum seller, but sales did not match their previous success. The Diane Warren-penned ballad "Strong as Steel" was taken as the next single but it peaked at No. 16 in the UK and failed to chart at all in the US. The next UK single, "Somewhere Somebody" failed to reach the top 20 and no further singles were released from the album.

In 1988, the group attempted to change their clean-cut image to a more adult-oriented "leather-clad" look, matched with a slightly harder-edged dance sound. Led by the Leon Sylvers III-produced single "Another Weekend" in the UK (which reached No. 18), their fourth album Rock the World met with only moderate success, and was their last top 20 album, peaking at No. 17. The album's second UK single, "Rock My World", became their last top 40 hit, and further singles from the album were unsuccessful. In the US, "Someone's in Love" was chosen as the lead single, but that and "Another Weekend" only managed minor placings on the Hot R&B chart.

In April 1989, their new single "With Every Heartbeat" again missed the top 40, peaking at No. 49. Later that year, a Greatest Hits collection was released but peaked at a lowly No. 53 on the UK Albums Chart. Amid reports of bankruptcy, the family had been forced to sell their Berkshire mansion after only two years. The family then moved to Hatfield, Hertfordshire.

While promoting "With Every Heartbeat", the group made an infamous appearance on the British children's TV show Going Live!, when, during a live phone-in, a teenage caller verbally abused them and asked why they were "so fucking crap".

=== 1990s ===
Now at loggerheads with RCA, Buster Pearson signed the group to Epic Records in 1990, and the group's fifth studio album, simply titled Five Star, was self-produced at the family home with every track being written by the group members. Despite heavy promotion, its two singles, "Treat Me Like a Lady" and "Hot Love", failed to reach the top 40. The album itself failed to chart and a planned third single, "What About Me Baby" was shelved.

In October 1990, Stedman Pearson pleaded guilty to a charge of public indecency, after being arrested in a public toilet in New Malden in London. Following this, the band relocated to the United States.

After the 1991 release of their sixth album, Shine (which was not released at all in the UK), Epic Records dropped the group. In 1994, the group released an album independently on their father's own Tent label, Heart and Soul, which was reissued in 1995 in the UK. Again, chart success eluded them and the group informally ended. Denise got married and had children, and Delroy went into music production.

=== 2000s ===
In 2001, a new Five Star single, "Funktafied", peaked at No. 99 on the US Hot R&B chart. However, the accompanying new album Eclipse was not a success and is the group's final album to date. Five Star returned to the UK in 2002, as a trio of Stedman, Denise and Lorraine, to perform on various tours, including the Here and Now nostalgia tour. In 2005, "System Addict" was re-recorded and re-released. Five Star were booked to perform a gig at Butlins in October 2006, in which all five members were billed. However, three impersonators were used to mime to backing tapes.

Denise Pearson said in 2007 that she was working on solo material, resulting in the release of her debut single in 2009.

In March 2007, Sony BMG released a compilation DVD of all the group's videos, entitled Five Star Performance.

For Five Star's 25th anniversary in 2008, Denise joined Stedman and backing dancers for gigs at Butlins during October and November 2008. Earlier that year, Denise stated in an interview with The Guardian newspaper that if she could convince sister Lorraine to join them, then all five original members of the group would like to perform one last tour together. The following year, she made her West End debut performing in Thriller - Live at the Lyric Theatre from January to December 2009.

=== 2010s to present ===
In 2010, Cherry Pop Records released expanded "Special Edition" versions of the group's first two albums Luxury of Life and Silk and Steel. By 2013, they had released expanded versions of all six albums originally released on RCA and Epic (both labels now being part of Sony BMG).

The very first song recorded by Five Star from 1983, "Problematic", was released digitally on 18 July 2011, along with a previously unreleased track called "It", which is an outtake from the Heart and Soul album sessions from 1994.

All five siblings performed at the 2012 Rewind Festivals on 21 July at Scone Palace, Perth, Scotland, and on 18 August in Henley-on-Thames. The band's father and manager, Buster Pearson, died in October 2012.

In 2013, Cherry Pop Records released The Remix Anthology, which included 7" and 12" remixes of the singles released on RCA and Epic between 1984 and 1991 which had not already been included on the "Special Edition" album reissues. This is the first compilation to include the non-charting 1984 singles, the US-only singles from 1987–88 and the Epic singles from 1990–91.

Five Star performed as a four piece after 2012. Delroy, Denise, Doris and Stedman performed every summer at festivals in the UK such as Rewind, Let's Rock and Lytham since Lorraine's departure.

In 2018, Denise announced UK tour dates under the Five Star name, which, for the first time, included four supporting artists who were not her siblings. The new line-up went on to perform at gigs and concerts throughout the summer. Around the same time, Lorraine Pearson conducted a live interview on Loose Women on UK television in which she declared that herself and Denise had been estranged for three years and that the new line-up did not "respect the legacy" of Five Star.

In 2018 all major Five Star projects was released as a CD box set.

Stedman Pearson died on 10 March 2025 of complications from diabetes at the age of 60.

== Members ==
- Denise Pearson – lead vocals, songwriter (1983–1995, 2001–2002, 2012–present)
- Doris Pearson – vocals, songwriter, choreographer (1983–1995, 2001–2002, 2012–2016)
- Lorraine Pearson – vocals, spokesperson, and songwriter (1983–1995, 2001–2002, 2012)
- Stedman Pearson – vocals, costume designer (1983–1995, 2001–2002, 2012–2016, died 2025)
- Delroy Pearson – vocals, songwriter, and producer (1983–1995, 2001–2002, 2012–2016)

== Discography ==
Studio albums

- Luxury of Life (1985)
- Silk and Steel (1986)
- Between the Lines (1987)
- Rock the World (1988)
- Five Star (1990)
- Shine (1991)
- Heart and Soul (1995)
- Eclipse (2001)
