= British soul =

Music genre

- Stylistic origins: Soul; rhythm and blues; gospel; blues
- Cultural origins: Early 1960s, United Kingdom
- Typical instruments: Electric bass; horns; drums; guitar; vocals; keyboard
- Derivative forms: Northern soul

British soul, Brit soul, or (in an American context) the British soul invasion, is soul music performed by British artists. Soul has been a major influence on British popular music since the 1960s, and American soul was extremely popular among some youth subcultures, such as mods, skinheads, and the Northern soul movement. In the 1970s, soul gained more mainstream popularity in the UK during the disco era.

However, a clear genre of British soul did not emerge until the 1980s, when a number of black and white artists who made soul their major focus, influenced by contemporary R&B, began to enjoy some commercial success. British soul artists began gaining popularity in the United States in the late 2000s, resulting in another British Invasion, this time a soul invasion (in contrast to the 1960s rock and pop, and 1980s Second British Invasion).

== History ==
=== Origins ===
Widespread British interest in soul music developed after the advent of rock and roll from the mid-1950s and the subsequent interest in American music. In the early 1960s, rhythm and blues, including soul, was particularly popular among some members of the beat music boom, including the Beatles, and among bands of who contributed to the blues rock, British blues boom, including the Spencer Davis Group, Alexis Korner, John Mayall, the Rolling Stones, the Animals, Them and Van Morrison. Most of these were popular with members of the Mod subculture, out of which grew the Northern soul movement, in which northern English youths avidly collected and played rare soul records.

=== 1960s ===
Britain produced a handful of soul acts in the 1960s, most significantly the blue-eyed soul singers Tom Jones and Dusty Springfield. Dusty in Memphis (1969) is one of the few albums by a British performer considered among the great soul recordings. In 1964, Springfield became the first British Invasion act after the Beatles to chart well in the US. A string of US and British hits followed. In 1965, Springfield hosted a television show The Sound of Motown, that has been widely credited with introducing what was called "The Sound of Young America" to British audiences. Arguably the most notable Motown-influenced act from the UK aside from Springfield were the Foundations, a multi-racial soul group described by Billboard as "the best practitioners of the Motown sound to be found on the far side of the Atlantic" in the late 1960s, who scored transatlantic hits with "Baby Now That I've Found You" (the first UK number one for a multi-racial band), "Build Me Up Buttercup" and "In the Bad Bad Old Days (Before You Loved Me)". British pop soul group the Equals gained hit "Baby Come Back".

It has been suggested that the performance of soul in Britain was so limited because white fans saw it as exclusively a black genre, and because black British performers, while incorporating some sounds into other forms such as reggae, considered soul a distant American genre. At the same time, bands led by black singers, notably Geno Washington and the Ram Jam Band, and Jimmy James and the Vagabonds, established strong reputations as live acts in Britain, largely playing cover versions of American soul records; Washington was an American expatriate, and James was from Jamaica.

=== 1970s ===
A handful of British artists continued to perform soul-inspired music in the 1970s. These included David Bowie, whose "Plastic soul" on his Young Americans album (1975), helped keep the sound in the British mainstream. Elton John gained blue eyed soul hit "Benny and the Jets". He experimented with the Philadelphia soul/disco sound while working with producer Thom Bell in 1977, sessions which eventually resulted in a UK #1 for John when "Are You Ready for Love" was re-released in 2003.

The Equals (with Eddy Grant), who had come to prominence in the late 1960s playing Caribbean-influenced pop-rock, embraced harder funk sounds on their 1970s releases, most notably on their UK top-10 hit "Black Skin Blue Eyed Boys". Sweet Sensation were the first all-black British soul band to score a UK number one hit with their song "Sad Sweet Dreamer" in 1974.

Also of note were the Average White Band, one of the few white soul groups to attain both critical respect and commercial success, particularly in the United States, where they simultaneously hit the number one spot on the Billboard pop singles and albums charts with "Pick Up the Pieces" and its album AWB, and scoring a Top 10 follow-up with 1975's "Cut the Cake". Although they were ignored in the UK, the Caribbean-British band Cymande enjoyed American success in the first half of the 1970s with their mix of funk, jazz, rock, Afrobeat and Caribbean influences, becoming the first British act to play the Apollo Theater in Harlem. After their split in 1975, their music became popular as a source of breaks among early hip-hop DJs including Grandmaster Flash, DJ Kool Herc and Jazzy Jay, was championed in the UK rare groove scene, and went on to be sampled extensively in rap and dance music, by acts including the Fugees, Wu-Tang Clan and Norman Cook.

One of the key figures in Britain's soul and disco scenes during the 1970s was Biddu, an Indian-born British composer and producer who gained breakthrough success with chart-topping hits such as "Kung Fu Fighting" (1974) with Carl Douglas and "I Love to Love (But My Baby Loves to Dance)" with Tina Charles, while his own Biddu Orchestra records also appeared in the charts. "Kung Fu Fighting" in particular sold eleven million records worldwide. In 1975, Carl Douglas released more soulful song "Dance the Kung Fu". Other British soul acts working with Biddu at the time included the Outriders and Jimmy James. Jimmy James & the Vagabonds recorded funky song "Disco Fever"(1976). Maxine Nightingale had an international pop disco hit in late 1975 and early 1976 with "Right Back Where We Started From".

The Real Thing, who were the most successful black rock/soul act in England during the 1970s, had major success with "You to Me Are Everything" and "Can't Get By Without You", UK chart number 1 and 2 respectively, produced by writers Ken Gold and Michael Deanne, and later tracks written by band members Chris and Eddie Amoo and produced by them with Dennis Weinreich. Gold also masterminded and produced British soul/funk group Delegation, who scored several moderate hits including "Where Is The Love (We Used To Know)" and the US R&B hit "Oh Honey"(1977). The 1977 disco soundtrack for Saturday Night Fever, mostly featured songs by British soul/disco act Bee Gees, who also produced the project, and went on to become the best-selling soundtrack album at the time.

After dabbling in reggae, pop-soul, glam rock, hard rock and bubblegum pop, Hot Chocolate enjoyed major success by settling on a pop-disco formula in the mid-1970s, enjoying a stream of hit singles such as "Brother Louie", "Emma", "You Sexy Thing", "So You Win Again" and "Every 1's a Winner", whilst including more experimental material on their albums. Heatwave, a multi-national but British-based disco-funk band, not only scored transatlantic hits with "Boogie Nights", "Always and Forever" and "The Groove Line", but also launched the career of songwriter Rod Temperton, who went on to write some of Michael Jackson's biggest hits, including "Off the Wall", "Rock with You" and "Thriller", as well as working with acts such as George Benson, Donna Summer, Herbie Hancock and Aretha Franklin, among others.

=== 1980s ===
In the 1980s, the situation began to change radically, with a wave of nostalgia for 1960s soul music. There were flourishing soul scenes in major cities like London and Manchester, often with many black artists, supported by pirate radio stations such as Invicta, Solar Radio, Kiss FM, and LWR, but most acts were unable to break out into the national consciousness. Britain's post-disco sound contributed some new black artists to the emerging contemporary R&B sound (originating in the U.S.) by artists such as Imagination. Also of note were Junior, whose major hit "Mama Used to Say" made him the first black British act to appear on Soul Train, followed by Princess with "Say I'm Your Number One" (1985), Jaki Graham with "Could It Be I'm Falling in Love", Central Line with "Walking into Sunshine" (1981) and the bands Linx and Freeez. Loose Ends, Five Star, 52nd Street, Beggar and Co and the Pasadenas gained R&B hits also. Increased interest in soul was reflected and fuelled by a series of covers and songs inspired by soul for a number of major acts including Phil Collins' cover of "You Can't Hurry Love" (1982), Paul Young's "Every Time You Go Away" (1984), Steve Winwood's "Higher Love" (1986) and "Roll with It" (1988) and songs by new wave acts including the Style Council's "Shout to the Top" (1984), Eurythmics' "Here Comes the Rain Again" and "Missionary Man" (1986), ABC's "When Smokey Sings" (1987), and Spandau Ballet's "True" and "Gold". Dexys Midnight Runners also achieved two UK number ones in "Come On Eileen" and "Geno" with their distinctive blend of Celtic folk, new wave and, most importantly, soul music.

For the first time since the 1960s, there were also notable acts who specialised in soul. These included George Michael, who reinvented himself a white soul singer with the multi-platinum album Faith (1987). Also significant were Ruby Turner, Sade, Loose Ends, and toward the end of the decade, Tongue 'n' Cheek, the Chimes, Lisa Stansfield and Soul II Soul. The latter's breakthrough hits "Keep On Movin'" and "Back to Life" in 1989 have been seen as opening the door to the mainstream for black British soul and R&B performers.

Whilst bands such as Soul II Soul started to see international success, a new underground wave of UK street soul began to emerge.

=== 1990s ===
In the 1990s, British soul-influenced acts included Omar and acid jazz bands Incognito, Young Disciples, Jamiroquai and Brand New Heavies. Particularly noticeable was the proliferation of British female black singers; many, like American artists of the 1950s and 1960s, coming out of a gospel tradition. These included Mica Paris, Caron Wheeler, Gabrielle, Des'ree, Beverley Knight and Pauline Henry. Mica Paris scored a US R&B hit with "I Wanna Hold On to You" in 1993.

=== 2000s ===
British soul in the 2000s was dominated by female singers and female-led bands, most notably Amy Winehouse, Estelle, Joss Stone, Duffy, Paloma Faith, Florence Welch, Adele, Floetry, Noisettes, Jessie J and Leona Lewis. They enjoyed success on the American charts, leading to talk of another British Invasion, known as the "Third British Invasion", "R&B British Invasion" or "British Soul Invasion". In 2008, Amy Winehouse won 5 Grammy Awards, at the time, more than any British female artist had won in one night. In 2009, Jay Sean's single "Down" reached the number one spot on the Billboard Hot 100 and sold millions in the United States, making him "the most successful male UK urban artist in US chart history" at the time.

=== 2010s ===
In 2010, Jay Sean's success was followed by Taio Cruz also topping the US Billboard Hot 100 in March 2010. The success of Sean and Cruz, as well as the upcoming American release of Tinchy Stryder, led to talk of how "U.K. stars seize American R&B". British R&B also increasingly incorporated electropop sounds in the late 2000s into the 2010s, exemplified by the music of Jay Sean and Taio Cruz.

Since then, Adele achieved global superstardom around the world, especially in the United States, where she had several number-one hits in 2011 and 2012. Her album 21 became the most sold-out of the 21st century and one of the most sold in history with over 35 million copies. In the United Kingdom, it was the second best-selling album ever. Then in 2015, 25 by Adele also saw much success across the Billboard 200, as it became the fastest-selling album in music history in the US, UK, Canada, New Zealand and globally.

Several other names gained popularity as well, including Paolo Nutini, Michael Kiwanuka and Samm Henshaw who achieved remarkable success in recent years.

Northern soul has also seen a resurgence in the UK and British artists such as Paul Stuart Davies, Johnny Boy and Stefan Taylor have contributed to its popularity in the present day.

=== 2020s ===
Many British music acts in the 2020s such as Olivia Dean, Raye, Sienna Spiro, Ebubé, Lizzie Berchie, Brooke Combe, BaggE, Sekou, 9Days, Samm Henshaw, Ego Ella May, Cherise, Elmiene, Shae Universe, Kwaku Asante, Sampha, Amethyst, Nectar Woode, Dayo Bello, and Olympia Vitalis have been credited with being part of a "new wave" of artists contributing to reviving the genre of Soul in pop music.

== See also ==
- Second British Invasion
- Fourth British Invasion
- Lists of British soul musicians, groups and songs
- The Craig Charles Funk and Soul Show - a BBC 6 Music radio programme
