= You'll Never Know What You're Missing =

Single by The Real Thing
- B-side: "Love Is a Playground"
- Released: 28 January 1977
- Genre: Disco; soul
- Length: 3:28
- Label: Pye
- Songwriter(s): Chris Amoo; Eddie Amoo
- Producer(s): Chris Amoo; Eddie Amoo; Dennis Weinriech

The Real Thing singles chronology
"Can't Get By Without You" (1976)	"You'll Never Know What You're Missing" (1977)	"Love's Such a Wonderful Thing" (1977)

"You'll Never Know What You're Missing" is a song by the British band The Real Thing, released in 1977. It was their third major hit after "You to Me Are Everything" and "Can't Get By Without You".

== Background ==
The song was written by Chris and Eddie Amoo. It was produced by Chris, Eddie and Dennis Weinreich for Tony Hall productions. The strings were arranged by Paul Buckmeister. The B-side of the single was "Love Is a Playground", also written by the Amoo's. They also co-produced it with Dennis Weinreich, and the strings and brass were arranged by Ian Green.

== Chart performance ==
For the week ending 27 February 1977 the single had jumped from no 48 to no 31 in the British charts. For the week ending 19 March the single had jumped from 25 to 20. By 26 March the single had dropped down a couple of notches to no 23. Billboard recorded that on the week ending 9 April 1977 the single had climbed from no 21 to no 16, which is where it peaked.
