= Tell Me What You Want =

Tell Me What You Want may refer to:

- "Tell Me What You Want" (Loose Ends song), 1983
- "Tell Me What You Want" (Weezer song), 2021
- "Tell Me What You Want", a song by Zebra, from the album Zebra
- "Tell Me What You Want", a song by Caroline Rose, from the album The Art of Forgetting
- "Tell Me What You Want", a song by Flo Milli, from the album Fine Ho, Stay
- "Tell Me What You Want", a song by Aaron Carter, from the album Aaron's Party (Come Get It)
- "Tell Me What You Want", a song by East 17, from the album Resurrection
