= Viscount Grant =

Afghan hound

- Other name: Gable
- Species: Canis lupus familiaris
- Breed: Afghan Hound
- Sex: Male
- Title: Best In Show at Crufts (1987)
- Predecessor: Ch. Ginger Xmas Carol (Airedale Terrier)
- Successor: Sh Ch. Starlite Express at Valsett (English Setter)
- Owners: Chris and Mrs Julie Amoo

Ch. Viscount Grant, also known as Gable, was an Afghan Hound who was the winner of the title of Best In Show at the Crufts dog show in 1987.

== Early life ==
Gable, known by his kennel name Viscount Grant, was owned by Chris Amoo, of the British band The Real Thing, and his wife Julie. They bred the dog themselves, after getting involved with the breed as Chris Amoo's record producer owned two Afghans. Gable was the third Afghan Hound to be owned by the couple, and Chris Amoo said that "I could tell when he was three weeks old that he was a champion".

== Show career ==
Gable was entered in his first dog show at the age of six months, and placed fourth overall. By his fourth show, Amoo said that Gable had hit his stride and victories started to come, winning 21 first prizes in a row at one point. The dog was entered into Crufts in 1986, and was named Best Puppy in the show. The 1988 Crufts show was the second time that Gable had been entered in the UK national, and was no longer eligible for the puppy classes. Amoo had previous experience with showing at this level, as he also owned an Afghan named Hamilton which had been named Best of Breed at the show twice. It was victorious once more, first winning Best of Breed, then the Hound Group and finally Best In Show.

Due to his victory, Gable won £175 for his owners as well as two trophies, which would need to be handed back prior to the following year's competition. He was also given a limited edition plate with his picture on it, and a sponsorship deal with the dog food Pedigree chum, with single payment of £350. As part of that deal, the dog food manufacturers also gave the owners a painting of Gable valued at £2,000.

== Following Crufts ==
Following his victory, Amoo described Gable as being "basically retired", but was concerned that the dog might become bored without dog shows to compete at. He felt that while he might take Gable along to a few shows, he wouldn't take him back to Crufts as failing to be Best in Show once again would be an anticlimax.

After Crufts, Gable was recognised from both his appearances on television as well as the ongoing advertisements for Pedigree Chum. Concerned that the attention was making him jumpy and nervous, his owners began to walk him less and they noticed that he was growing more insular over time. A number of offers were made to purchase the dog, but the owners turned these down as they considered Gable to be one of the family.
