= Magic Touch =

Magic Touch or The Magic Touch may refer to:

== Music ==
- Magic Touch Records, a record label that existed between 1964 and 1977, initially distributed by Atco Records

=== Albums ===
- The Magic Touch (album), a 1962 album by Tadd Dameron
- Magic Touch (Stanley Jordan album), 1985
- Magic Touch (Magic Sam and Shakey Jake album), 1983
- Magic Touch, 2002 album by Nusrat Fateh Ali Khan
- Magic Touch, 2007 album by John Németh

=== Songs ===
- "(You've Got) The Magic Touch", a 1956 song by The Platters, written by Buck Ram, covered by various artists
- "Magic Touch", a 1979 song by Kiss from the album Dynasty
- "Magic Touch" (Mike Oldfield song), 1987
- "Magic Touch" (Loose Ends song), 1985
- "Magic Touch", a 1987 song by Aerosmith from the album Permanent Vacation
- "Magic Touch", a 1988 song by Milli Vanilli, released as a B-side on their single for "Girl You Know It's True"

== Film ==
- The Magic Touch, 1958 Hong Kong film which was the first film of Margaret Tu Chuan
- The Magic Touch (film), a 1992 Hong Kong comedy film written, produced and directed by Michael Hui
- Magic Touch of Fate, a Korean film

== Games and comics ==
- Magic Touch (game), a 2007 flash game by Nitrome
- The Magic Touch (manga), a 2003 manga series written and illustrated by Izumi Tsubaki
