= Stay a Little While, Child =

"Stay A Little While, Child"

Single by Loose Ends

from the album Zagora
- B-side: "Gonna Make You Mine"
- Released: June 2, 1986 (UK/US)
- Recorded: 1985–86
- Genre: R&B
- Label: Virgin Records
- Songwriter(s): Carl McIntosh, Jane Eugene, Steve Nichol
- Producer(s): Nick Martinelli

Loose Ends singles chronology
"Golden Years" (1985)	"Stay A Little While, Child" (1986)	"Slow Down" (1986)

"Stay A Little While, Child" is the tenth single by English R&B band Loose Ends from their third studio album, Zagora, and was released in June 1986 by Virgin Records. The song reached number 52 in the UK Charts.

== Track listing ==
7” Single: VS819

1. "Stay A Little While, Child" 4.09
2. "Gonna Make You Mine" 4.29 **

12” Single: VS819-12

1. "Stay A Little While, Child (Extended Version)" 8.11 *
2. "Gonna Make You Mine" 4.29 **
3. "Stay A Little While, Child (Dub Version)" 7.56 **

2nd 12” Single: VS819-13

1. "Stay A Little While, Child (Extended Version)" 8.11 *
2. "Gonna Make You Mine" **
3. "Tell Me What You Want (U.S. Remix)" - Edited version of the mix featured on the U.S. version of the CD album 'A Little Spice'

3rd 12” Single: VS819-14

1. "Stay A Little While, Child (Extended Version)" 8.11 *
2. "Gonna Make You Mine (Westside Remix)" 5.43 +
3. "Gonna Make You Mine (Bonus Beats)"

U.S. only release - 12" Single MCA-23635

1. "Stay A Little While, Child (Extended Version)" 8.11 *
2. "Stay A Little While, Child (Radio Edit)" 5:55
3. "Stay A Little While, Child (Dub Version)" 7:56 **
4. "Stay A Little While, Child (Instrumental)" 5:55
5. "Stay A Little While, Child (Bonus Beats)" 5:42

* The Extended Version of 'Stay A Little While, Child' was released on the U.S. version of the CD album 'Zagora' instead of the Album Version.

** 'Gonna Make You Mine' and Stay A Little While, Child (Dub Version) were released as extra tracks on the CD album 'Zagora'

+ 'Gonna Make You Mine (Westside Remix)' was released on CD in 1992 on the 'Tighten Up Volume 1' remix project. It was remixed by Dancin' Danny D & Godwin Logie.

== Chart performance ==
Chart (1986)	Peak position
UK Singles Chart	52
US "Billboard" Hot Dance Disco- Club Play	49
US Billboard Hot Black Singles	18
