= Nights of Pleasure =

Single by Loose Ends

from the album Zagora
- B-side: "Let's Rock"
- Released: November 29, 1986 (UK); December 1, 1986 (US)
- Recorded: 1986
- Genre: R&B
- Length: 3:18
- Label: Virgin Records
- Songwriters: Carl McIntosh, Jane Eugene, Steve Nichol
- Producer: Nick Martinelli

Loose Ends singles chronology
"Slow Down" (1986)	"Nights of Pleasure" (1986)	"Ooh, You Make Me Feel" (1987)

"Nights of Pleasure" is the 12th single by English R&B band, Loose Ends, from their third studio album, Zagora. It was released in November 1986 by Virgin Records and was produced by Loose Ends' longtime collaborator Nick Martinelli.

== Track listing ==
7” Single: VS919

1. "Nights Of Pleasure (7" Mix)" 3.18
2. "Let's Rock (7" Remix)" 3.42 - remix by Carl 'Macca' McIntosh & Steve Nichol

12” Single: VS919-12

1. "Nights Of Pleasure (12" Full Length Version / Nick Martinelli Mix)" 5.33
2. "Let's Rock (Full Length Version / Steve Nichol & Macca Mix)" 6.11
3. "Nights Of Pleasure (Dub Version)" 4.50

2nd 12” Single: VS819-13

1. "Nights Of Pleasure (12" Mix)"
2. "Let's Rock (Full Length Version / Steve Nichol & Macca Mix)" 6.11
3. "Johnny Broadhead" 5.51
4. "Slow Down (12" Mix / Extended Version)" 7.33

12” Single: VSD919-12 - 'Special DJ Pleasure Pack'

1. "Nights Of Pleasure (12" Full Length Version / Nick Martinelli Mix)" 5.33
2. "Let's Rock (Full Length Version / Steve Nichol & Macca Mix)" 6.11
3. "Nights Of Pleasure (Dancing Danny Dee Remix)" 6.00
4. "Nights Of Pleasure (Dancing Danny Dee Dub)" 4.50

Some copies of 7" came with free cassette 'The Baksheesh Mixes' VSC919

1. "Gonna Make You Mine (Westside Mix)" 5.45 *
2. "Choose Me (Dave 'The Blade' Edit)" 5.58
3. "Silent Talking (Album Mix)" 5.02
4. "Nights Of Pleasure (7" Mix)" 3.29
5. "Let's Rock (7" Remix)" 3.44

== Charts ==
Chart (1986–1987)	Peak Position
UK Singles Chart	42
U.S. Billboard Hot Black Singles	58
