= Love Is a Wonderful Thing =

Love Is a Wonderful Thing may refer to:

- "Love Is a Wonderful Thing" (Michael Bolton song), single
- "Love Is a Wonderful Thing" (Peggy Zina song), single, entered in Eurovision Song Contest

== See also ==
- "Love's Such a Wonderful Thing", song by The Real Thing
- "What a Wonderful Thing Love Is", song by Al Green
