= Ooh, You Make Me Feel =

Single by Loose Ends

from the album Zagora
- B-side: "Ooh, You Make Me Feel" (Dub Mix)
- Released: 1987 (UK)
- Recorded: 1986
- Genre: R&B
- Length: 6:03 (12" version)
- Label: Virgin Records
- Songwriters: Carl McIntosh, Jane Eugene, Steve Nichol
- Producer: Nick Martinelli

Loose Ends singles chronology
"Nights of Pleasure" (1986)	"Ooh, You Make Me Feel" (1987)	"You Can't Stop the Rain" (1987)

Ooh, You Make Me Feel is the 13th single by English R&B band, Loose Ends, from their third studio album, Zagora. It was released in 1987 via Virgin Records in the UK. The song peaked at number 77 on the UK Singles Chart.

== Track listing ==
7” Single: VS991

1. "Ooh, You Make Me Feel"
2. "Ooh, You Make Me Feel" (Dub Mix)

12” Single: VS991-12

1. "Ooh, You Make Me Feel (Extended Mix)"
2. "Ooh, You Make Me Feel (Percussapella Mix)"
3. "Ooh, You Make Me Feel (Dub Mix)"

Cassette single VS991-12

1. "Ooh, You Make Me Feel (Extended Mix)"
2. "Ooh, You Make Me Feel (Percussapella Mix)"
3. "Ooh, You Make Me Feel (Dub Mix)"

== Chart performance ==
Chart (1987)	Peak position
UK Singles Chart	77
