= Loose Ends (band) =

British contemporary R&B group

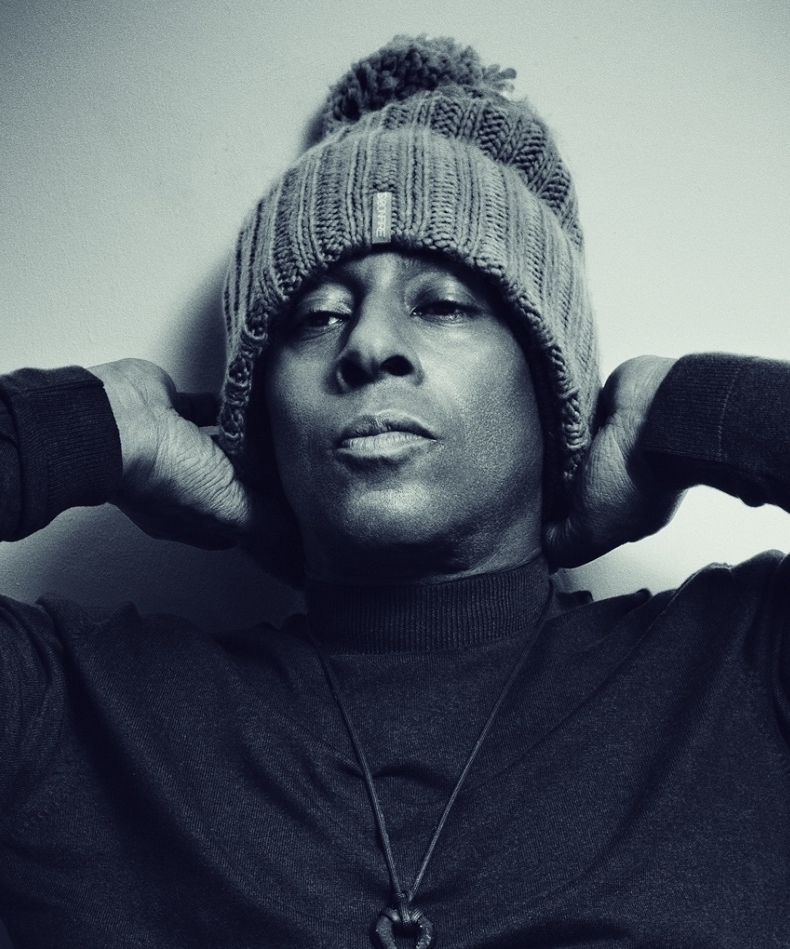
- Carl McIntosh in 2018

Background information
- Also known as: Loose End
- Origin: London, England
- Genres: Soul; funk; R&B; post-disco
- Years active: 1980–1990
- Labels: Virgin Records; Digital Jukebox Records
- Past members: Carl McIntosh; Laurneá Wilkerson; Linda Carriere; Sunay Suleyman; Steve Nichol; Jane Eugene

Loose Ends (also known as Loose End) was a British R&B band that achieved several hit records throughout the 1980s and into the 1990s. The trio was formed in London in 1980, initially comprising vocalist and guitarist Carl McIntosh, vocalist Jane Eugene, and keyboard player and vocalist Steve Nichol.

Despite enjoying success throughout the 1980s, both Nichol and Eugene left the group in 1990 due to personal differences.

== Career ==
Loose Ends signed with Virgin Records in 1981 under the name 'Loose End'. Some of their debut material was written for them by Chris Amoo and Eddie Amoo, who had achieved UK Singles Chart success in the 1970s with their group The Real Thing. The trio changed their name to Loose Ends in 1983 and continued to record for Virgin. They were distributed in the U.S. by MCA Records.

The group was founded by Steve Nichol after he left the London Guildhall School of Music and Drama. Nichol went on to tour with The Jam in 1982 as a trumpet, trombone, and keyboard player. Together, the trio achieved their first success with "Hangin' on a String (Contemplating)" in 1985, which reached No. 13 in the British chart. "Hangin' on a String" also reached No. 1 on the US Billboard R&B chart, making Loose Ends the first African-British band to top that chart. They reached No. 16 with the single "Magic Touch" in the same year. The disc was produced in the US, as was their 1986 hit "Slow Down" (later used as the theme music for Canadian MuchMusic's Soul in the City programme). At this time, Carl McIntosh also arranged and played on a number of tracks from Five Star's debut album, including the single "Let Me Be The One," which reached No. 2 in the same listings later in 1986. In spite of subsequent falling sales, the trio notched their final transatlantic hit in 1988 with "Watching You (Watching Me)."

The group's line-up changed in 1990 due to differences in its proposed musical direction. Eugene and Nichol decided to leave and were replaced by Linda Carriere and Sunay Suleyman. Look How Long turned out to be the final studio album released under the Loose Ends name, and featured their final hit single, "Don't Be a Fool" (1990). McIntosh went on to work behind the recording desk with the new members and has continued to do so to this day. He has since produced several artists' work, most notably that of Caron Wheeler, Ruth Joy, and Kwesi.

The original line-up of Carl McIntosh, Jane Eugene, and Steve Nichol briefly reunited in 1998 for a guest appearance on "Take Your Time", a song from Pete Rock's debut solo album, Soul Survivor, which was released as a single the following year. All three also appeared in the music video for the song.

== 2015–present ==
During 2015, McIntosh was interviewed by Daniel Falconer of the celebrity magazine Female First to speak about his top 10 career moments. Also in the same year, he participated in a charity fundraising event in Glasgow, Scotland, in aid of supporting Gambia. In 2016, leading Toronto newspaper Now interviewed McIntosh about his role in introducing Toronto to UK soul music in the 1980s and 1990s. In 2017, McIntosh was asked by Red Bull Music Academy in Melbourne, Australia, to speak about how he had previously produced Loose Ends' songs. During 2020, Smooth Radio presenter Angie Greaves interviewed McIntosh about how he continued with Loose Ends after the departure of former members, explaining how the group did not break up when two members left.

Soon after, McIntosh was asked by Roland Corporation music to discuss and demonstrate how he produced the drum programming using the legendary Roland TR-808 drum machine for the hit song "Hangin' on a String (Contemplating)". McIntosh went into great detail explaining how it was produced.

McIntosh continues to perform and write new songs under the name Loose Ends with the 1990 line-up of Linda Carriere and Sunay Suleyman. In 2021, Loose Ends signed a new record deal with the British hip hop label Digital Jukebox Records to release new singles and albums.

== Discography ==
=== Studio albums ===
Year	Album details	Peak chart positions					Certifications
Year	Album details	UK	NLD	NZ	US	US R&B	Certifications
1984	A Little Spice: First studio album; Release date: 25 May 1984; Label: Virgin, MCA	46	—	—	46	5	
1985	So Where Are You?: Second studio album; Release date: 10 August 1985; Label: Virgin	13	—	33	—	—	BPI: Silver
1986	Zagora: Third studio album; Release date: 7 May 1986; Label: Virgin, MCA	15	—	—	59	7	BPI: Silver
1988	The Real Chuckeeboo: Fourth studio album; Release date: 18 June 1988; Label: Virgin, MCA	52	66	—	80	16	
1990	Look How Long: Fifth studio album; Release date: 16 September 1990; Label: 10, MCA	19	—	—	124	28	BPI: Silver
"—" denotes releases that did not chart or were not released in that territory.

=== Compilation albums ===
Year	Album details	Peaks
Year	Album details	UK
1992	Tighten Up Vol. 1: First compilation album; Release date: 7 September 1992; Label: 10	40
2003	The Best of Loose Ends: Second compilation album; Release date: 27 May 2003; Label: EMI	—
"—" denotes releases that did not chart.

=== Singles ===
Year	Single	Peak chart positions							Album
Year	Single	UK	IRE	NLD	NZ	US	US R&B	US Dance	Album
1982	"In the Sky"	—	—	—	—	—	—	—	N/A
1982	"We've Arrived"	—	—	—	—	—	—	—	N/A
1983	"Don't Hold Back Your Love"	—	—	—	—	—	—	—	N/A
1984	"Tell Me What You Want"	74	—	—	—	—	—	29	A Little Spice
1984	"Emergency (Dial 999)"	41	—	—	—	—	—	—	A Little Spice
1984	"Choose Me (Rescue Me)"	59	—	—	—	—	47	25	A Little Spice
1985	"Hangin' on a String (Contemplating)"	13	26	33	12	43	1	12	A Little Spice / So Where Are You?
1985	"Magic Touch"	16	23	—	—	—	—	—	So Where Are You?
1985	"Golden Years"	59	—	—	—	—	—	—	So Where Are You?
1986	"Stay a Little While, Child"	52	—	—	—	—	18	49	Zagora
1986	"Slow Down"	27	—	—	—	—	1	42	Zagora
1986	"Nights of Pleasure"	42	—	—	—	—	58	—	Zagora
1987	"Ooh, You Make Me Feel"	77	—	—	—	—	—	—	Zagora
1987	"You Can't Stop the Rain"	—	—	—	—	—	32	—	So Where Are You? / Zagora
1988	"Mr. Bachelor"	50	—	—	—	—	11	—	The Real Chuckeeboo
1988	"Watching You"	83	—	—	—	—	2	—	The Real Chuckeeboo
1989	"Life"	—	—	—	—	—	32	—	The Real Chuckeeboo
1990	"Don't Be a Fool"	13	—	—	—	—	10	50	Look How Long
1990	"Love's Got Me"	40	—	—	—	—	76	—	Look How Long
1991	"Cheap Talk"	92	—	—	—	—	28	—	Look How Long
1991	"Time Is Ticking"	—	—	—	—	—	—	—	Look How Long
1992	"Hangin' on a String" (Frankie Knuckles Remix)	25	—	—	—	—	—	—	Tighten Up Vol. 1
1992	"Magic Touch" (Remix)	75	—	—	—	—	—	—	Tighten Up Vol. 1
1993	"My Way"	—	—	—	—	—	—	—	N/A
2021	"Gonna Make You Mine (Forever More)"	—	—	—	—	—	—	—	N/A
"—" denotes releases that did not chart or were not released in that territory.
