= Emergency (Dial 999) =

Single by Loose Ends

from the album A Little Spice
- B-side: "Emergency (Dial 999) (Dub Mix)"
- Released: April 1984 (UK)
- Recorded: 1984
- Genre: R&B
- Length: 3:50
- Label: Virgin Records
- Songwriter(s): Carl McIntosh, Jane Eugene, Steve Nichol
- Producer(s): Nick Martinelli

Loose Ends singles chronology
"Tell Me What You Want" (1984)	"Emergency (Dial 999)" (1984)	"Choose Me (Rescue Me)" (1984)

"Emergency (Dial 999)" is the fifth single by English R&B band Loose Ends from their first studio album, A Little Spice, and was released in April 1984 by Virgin Records. The 7" and 12" Version were remixed versions from the forthcoming album "A Little Spice". The single reached number 41 in the UK charts.

== Track listing ==
7” Single: VS677

1. "Emergency (Dial 999)" 3.50
2. "Emergency (Dial 999) (Dub Mix)" 4.00

12” Single: VS677-12

1. "Emergency (Dial 999) (Extended Remix)" 6.42 *
2. "Emergency (Dial 999) (Dub Mix)" 5.55

The Extended Remix version was released on CD on the U.S. Version of the 'A Little Spice' album (MCAD27141) and also on the limited 3" CD Single of 'Hangin' On A String [Contemplating]' (Cat. No. CDT39).

== Chart performance ==
Chart (1984)	Peak position
UK Singles Chart	41
