= Choose Me (Rescue Me) =

Single by Loose Ends

from the album A Little Spice
- B-side: "Choose Me (Rescue Me) (Dub Mix)"
- Released: June 1984 (UK)
- Recorded: 1984
- Genre: R&B
- Length: 3:35
- Label: Virgin Records
- Songwriter(s): Carl McIntosh, Jane Eugene, Steve Nichol
- Producer(s): Nick Martinelli

Loose Ends singles chronology
"Emergency (Dial 999)" (1984)	"Choose Me (Rescue Me)" (1984)	"Hangin' on a String (Contemplating)" (1985)

"Choose Me (Rescue Me)" is the sixth single by the English R&B band, Loose Ends from their first studio album, A Little Spice, and was released in 1984 by Virgin Records. The song reached number 59 in the UK Charts.

== Track listing ==
7” Single: VS697

1. "Choose Me (Rescue Me)" 3.35
2. "Choose Me (Rescue Me) (Dub Mix)" 4.35

12” Single: VS697-12

1. "Choose Me (Rescue Me) (Extended Remix)" 5.56
2. "Choose Me (Rescue Me) (Dub Mix)" 5.30

2nd 12” Single: VS697-12 - limited edition with bonus 12"

1. "Choose Me (Rescue Me) (Extended Remix)" 5.56
2. "Choose Me (Rescue Me) (Dub Mix)" 5.30
3. "In The Sky (Remix)"
4. "Mastermind Turntable Mix" - mixed by Nick Martinelli containing a medley of the tracks 'Tell Me What You Want' and 'Emergency (Dial 999)'.

U.S. only 12” Single: MCA23581 *

1. "Choose Me (Rescue Me) (Dance Version)" 7.06
2. "Choose Me (Rescue Me) (Dub Version)" 6.43
- These two mixes are both exclusive to this U.S. release. They're different to the ones released in the UK and Europe.

== Chart performance ==
Chart (1984–85)	Peak position
UK Singles Chart	59
US "Billboard" Hot Dance Disco-Club Play	25
US Billboard Hot Black Singles	47
