= Hangin' on a String (Contemplating) =

1985 single by Loose Ends

Single by Loose Ends

from the album So Where Are You? (also on U.S. version of A Little Spice)
- B-side: "A Little Spice"
- Released: February 23, 1985
- Recorded: 1984
- Genre: R&B; funk
- Length: 3:42
- Label: Virgin Records
- Songwriter(s): Carl McIntosh, Jane Eugene, Steve Nichol
- Producer(s): Nick Martinelli

Loose Ends singles chronology
"Choose Me (Rescue Me)" (1984)	"Hangin' on a String" (1985)	"Magic Touch" (1985)

"Hangin' on a String (Contemplating)" is the seventh single by British soul band Loose Ends from their second studio album, So Where Are You?, and was released in February 1985 by Virgin Records. In the group's native UK, the single made the top twenty. Outside the UK, the single went to number one on the US Billboard R&B chart for one week. This made Loose Ends the first British band ever to top that chart It also reached number 43 on the Billboard Hot 100.

== Track listing ==
- 7” single: VS748
1. "Hangin' on a String (Contemplating)" 3.42
2. "A Little Spice" 5.08
- 12” single: VS748-12
1. "Hangin' on a String (Contemplating)" (Extended Dance Mix) 5.58
2. "A Little Spice" 5.08
- 2nd 12” single: VS748-13
1. "Hangin' on a String (Contemplating)" (Extended Dance Mix) 5.58
2. "Silent Talking" (feat. Tom Browne)
3. "A Little Spice" 5.08
- 3rd 12” single: VS748-14
1. "Hangin' on a String (Contemplating)" (Mastermind Megamix)
2. "Hangin' on a String (Contemplating)" (Extended Dance Mix) 5.58
- 3” CD single: released 1989
1. "Hangin' on a String (Contemplating)" (Extended Dance Mix) 5.58
2. "A Little Spice" 5.08
3. "Emergency [Dial 999]" (Extended Remix) 6.42

== Charts ==
Chart (1985)	Peak position
UK Singles (OCC)	13
US Billboard Hot 100	43
US Dance (Billboard)	12
US R&B (Billboard)	1

== Hangin' on a String (Contemplating) 1992 ==
"Hangin' on a String (Contemplating) (Frankie Knuckles Remix)"

Single by Loose Ends

from the album Tighten Up Volume 1
- B-side: "Hangin' on a String (Contemplating)" (Original 7" Mix)
- Released: 14 June 1992 (UK)
- Recorded: 1985
- Genre: R&B
- Length: 4:20
- Label: Ten Records
- Songwriter(s): Carl McIntosh; Jane Eugene; Steve Nichol
- Producer(s): Nick Martinelli

Loose Ends singles chronology
"Cheap Talk" (1991)	"Hangin' on a String (Contemplating) (Frankie Knuckles Remix)" (1992)	"Magic Touch" (1992)

"Hangin' on a String (Contemplating)" was remixed and re-released in 1992. This was a track taken from the forthcoming Loose Ends Remix project "Tighten Up Volume 1".

=== Track listing ===
- 7” single: TEN406
1. "Hangin' on a String (Contemplating)" (Frankie Knuckles Radio Edit) 4.20
2. "Hangin' on a String (Contemplating)" (Original 7" Mix) 3.42
- 12” single: TENX406
1. "Hangin' on a String (Contemplating)" (Frankie Knuckles Club Mix) 6.28
2. "Hangin' on a String (Contemplating)" (Original 12" Mix) 5.58
3. "Hangin' on a String (Contemplating)" (The All Night Mix) 5.50
4. "Johnny Broadhead" (Part 2)
- CD single: TENCD406
1. "Hangin' on a String (Contemplating)" (Frankie Knuckles Radio Edit) 4.20
2. "Hangin' on a String (Contemplating)" (Frankie Knuckles Club Mix) 6.28
3. "Hangin' on a String (Contemplating)" (Original 12" Mix) 5.58
4. "Hangin' on a String (Contemplating)" (The All Night Mix) 5.50
5. "Hangin' on a String (Contemplating)" (Frankie Knuckles Classic Club Reprise) 6.08

=== Charts ===
==== Weekly charts ====
Chart (1992)	Peak position
UK Singles (OCC)	25
UK Dance (Music Week)	7
UK Club Chart (Music Week)	3

==== Year-end charts ====
Chart (1992)	Position
UK Club Chart (Music Week)	54

== In popular culture ==
- In 2008, the song was featured on Grand Theft Auto IV's in-game radio station The Vibe 98.8.
- Rapper Wiz Khalifa sampled this song for his song The Kid Frankie from the album Kush & Orange Juice, as did Big Daddy Kane for the remixed version of his 1991 hit The Lover in You
- In 2022, the song was featured in the ninth episode of the third season of Atlanta.
