= A Little Spice =

Studio album by Loose Ends
- Released: 25 May 1984
- Recorded: 1982–1984
- Genre: R&B
- Label: Virgin (UK), MCA (US)
- Producer: Nick Martinelli

Loose Ends chronology
A Little Spice (1984)	So Where Are You? (1985)

Professional ratings
Review scores
Source	Rating
Allmusic	link

A Little Spice is the debut album released by the English R&B band Loose Ends. The original UK version was released in 1984 (some early pressings list "1983").

The following year, an alternative version of the album, featuring "Hangin' on a String (Contemplating)" in place of "Feels So Right Now" and a re-ordered overall track listing was released for the U.S. market. This album reached number five on the U.S. R&B chart in 1985, while the single, "Hangin' on a String", became a number one hit on both the U.S. Dance and US R&B charts. It was a moderate hit on the Billboard Hot 100 charts. It is featured in the popular video game Grand Theft Auto IV's fictional Soul/R&B radio station The Vibe 98.8. Between 1991 and 2009 the album sold an additional 126,000 copies in the United States according to Nielsen Soundscan seven years after its initial release. The album remains uncertified with overall sales unknown.

== Track listing ==
=== European version ===
All tracks are written by Carl McIntosh, Jane Eugene and Steve Nichol, except where noted.

Side one
No.	Title	Writer(s)	Length
1.	"Tell Me What You Want"	Carl McIntosh, Ray Shell, Steve Nichol	4:47
2.	"Feel So Right Now"		5:24
3.	"Let's Rock"		4:57
4.	"So Much Love"	Carl McIntosh, Steve Nichol, Ian Foster, Jane Eugene	4:31

Side two
No.	Title	Length
5.	"Emergency (Dial 999)"	4:52
6.	"Music Takes Me Higher"	4:56
7.	"Choose Me (Rescue Me)"	4:34
8.	"A Little Spice"	5:08

2011 remastered reissue bonus tracks
No.	Title	Length
9.	"In the Sky" (UK Single - Long Version)	6:13
10.	"Only a Day Away"	4:28
11.	"We've Arrived" (UK Single - US Mix)	5:46
12.	"Don't Hold Back Your Love" (UK Single)	5:28
13.	"No Stranger to Darkness" (UK Single)	5:58
14.	"Tell Me What You Want" (Extended Version)	6:12
15.	"Choose Me (Rescue Me)" (Extended Version)	5:59

=== North American version ===
All tracks are written by Carl McIntosh, Jane Eugene and Steve Nichol, except where noted.

Side one
No.	Title	Length
1.	"Hangin' on a String (Contemplating)"	6:00
2.	"Choose Me (Rescue Me)"	5:56
3.	"Music Takes Me Higher"	4:56
4.	"Emergency (Dial 999)"	6:47

Side two
No.	Title	Writer(s)	Length
5.	"Tell Me What You Want"	Carl McIntosh, Ray Shell, Steve Nichol	6:12
6.	"A Little Spice"		5:08
7.	"So Much Love"	Carl McIntosh, Steve Nichol, Ian Foster, Jane Eugene	4:31
8.	"Let's Rock"		4:57

== Charts ==
=== Weekly charts ===
Chart (1985)	Peak position
UK Albums (OCC)	46
US Billboard 200	46
US Top R&B/Hip-Hop Albums (Billboard)	5

=== Year-end charts ===
Chart (1985)	Position
US Top R&B/Hip-Hop Albums (Billboard)	39

=== Singles ===
Title	UK	US	US R&B
"Tell Me What You Want"	74	-	-
"Emergency (Dial 999)"	41	-	-
"Choose Me (Rescue Me)"	59	-	47

== Personnel ==
=== Loose Ends ===
- Jane Eugene - vocals
- Carl "Macca" McIntosh - bass, vocals
- Steve Nichol - keyboards, trumpet, vocals

=== Additional personnel ===
- Herb Smith - guitars
- Ron Jennings - guitars, bass
- Donald Robinson - flute
- Bobby Malach - saxophone
- "Doctor" Leonard Gibbs - drums, percussion
