= Don't Be a Fool =

1990 single by Loose Ends

Single by Loose Ends

from the album Look How Long
- Released: October 26, 1990
- Genre: R&B
- Length: 4:20
- Label: 10/Virgin; MCA
- Songwriters: Carl McIntosh; Sunay Suleyman
- Producer: Carl McIntosh

Loose Ends singles chronology
| "Life" (1989) | "Don't Be a Fool" (1990) | "Cheap Talk" (1991) |

"Don't Be a Fool" is a song performed by British contemporary R&B group Loose Ends, issued as the lead single from their fifth studio album Look How Long. Produced by band member Carl McIntosh, it is the first single from the band to not feature original members Jane Eugene and Steve Nichol; they both left the band following their previous album The Real Chuckeeboo and were subsequently replaced by Linda Carriere and Sunay Suleyman. Suleyman co-wrote the song with McIntosh.

"Don't Be a Fool" peaked at #10 on the Billboard R&B chart in 1990.

== Charts ==
=== Weekly charts ===
| Chart (1990–1991) | Peak position |
|---|---|
| UK Singles (OCC) | 13 |
| US Dance Music/Club Play Singles (Billboard) | 50 |
| US Hot Dance Music/Maxi-Singles Sales (Billboard) | 13 |
| US Hot R&B/Hip-Hop Singles & Tracks (Billboard) | 10 |

=== Year-end charts ===
| Chart (1990) | Position |
|---|---|
| UK Club Chart (Record Mirror) | 33 |
