= Watching You (Loose Ends song) =

Single by Loose Ends

from the album The Real Chuckeeboo
- B-side: "Watching You (Dub)"
- Released: 1988 (Europe); 1988 (United States)
- Recorded: 1988
- Genre: R&B, New jack swing
- Length: 4:33
- Label: Virgin
- Songwriter(s): Carl McIntosh; Jane Eugene; Steve Nichol
- Producer(s): Nick Martinelli

Loose Ends singles chronology
"Mr Bachelor" (1988)	"Watching You" (1988)	"Life" (1989)

"Watching You" is the second single release from the 1988 album The Real Chuckeeboo by British group Loose Ends. It was written as most of their songs were by Carl McIntosh, Jane Eugene and Steve Nichol; it was co-produced by Loose Ends and longtime collaborator Nick Martinelli. The song reached number #2 on the Billboard R&B Chart; noted among Loose Ends fans as one of their finest efforts it was also one of their biggest hits.

== Chart performance ==
Chart (1988)	Peak position
UK Singles Chart	83
US Billboard Hot Black Singles	2
