= So Where Are You? =

Studio album by Loose Ends
- Released: August 10, 1985
- Recorded: 1984–1985
- Genre: R&B
- Label: Virgin
- Producer: Nick Martinelli

Loose Ends chronology
A Little Spice (1984)	So Where Are You? (1985)	Zagora (1986)

Professional ratings
Review scores
Source	Rating
Allmusic	3.5/5 stars

So Where Are You? is the second album released by the English R&B band Loose Ends. It reached number 13 in the UK in 1985. It features the hits, "Magic Touch" and a cover of David Bowie's "Golden Years". The hit single "Hangin' on a String (Contemplating)", which had appeared on the U.S. edition of the previous album, A Little Spice, is also featured here. It also makes an appearance in popular video game Grand Theft Auto IV's fictional Soul/R&B radio station The Vibe 98.8. The album was not released in the United States.

== Track listing ==
All tracks are written by Jane Eugene, Carl McIntosh and Steve Nichol, except where noted

Side one
No.	Title	Writer(s)	Length
1.	"Magic Touch"		4:34
2.	"A New Horizon"		5:04
3.	"If My Lovin' Makes You Hot"		5:02
4.	"So Where Are You?"		4:40
5.	"Golden Years"	David Bowie	3:50

Side two
No.	Title	Writer(s)	Length
6.	"Hangin' on a String (Contemplating)"		6:00
7.	"Give It All You Got"	Jane Eugene, Carl McIntosh, Steve Nichol, Kareem Dua	3:52
8.	"The Sweetest Pain"	Cynthia Biggs, Dexter Wansel	5:55
9.	"You Can't Stop the Rain"		4:19
10.	"Silent Talking"		5:00

2011 remastered reissue bonus tracks
No.	Title	Length
11.	"Hangin' on a String" (The Twilight Firm All Night Mix)	5:49
12.	"Hangin' on a String" (Frankie Knuckles Club Mix)	6:27
13.	"You Can't Stop the Rain" (Timmy Regisford Remix)	5:50
14.	"Golden Years" (UK 12" Single Mix)	5:30
15.	"Magic Touch" (Vibes Version [feat. Roy Ayers])	6:30

== Charts ==
Chart (1985)	Peak position
UK Albums Chart	13

=== Singles ===
Title	UK	US	US R&B
"Hangin' on a String (Contemplating)"	13	43	1
"Magic Touch"	16	–	–
"Golden Years"	59	–	–
