= Magic Touch (Loose Ends song) =

Single by Loose Ends

from the album So Where Are You?
- B-side: "Magic Touch (Instrumental)"
- Released: May 1985 (UK)
- Recorded: May 1985
- Genre: R&B
- Label: Virgin Records
- Songwriters: Carl McIntosh; Jane Eugene; Steve Nichol
- Producer: Nick Martinelli

Loose Ends singles chronology
"Hangin' on a String (Contemplating)" (1985)	"Magic Touch" (1985)	"Golden Years" (1985)

"Magic Touch " is the eighth single by English R&B band Loose Ends from their second studio album, So Where Are You? (1985), and was released in May 1985 by Virgin Records. In the group's native UK, the single reached number 16. It is the opening track from the album.

== Track listing ==
- 7” Single: VS761
1. "Magic Touch"
2. "Magic Touch" (Instrumental)
- 12” Single: VS761-12
1. "Magic Touch" (Club Mix) 6.19
2. "Magic Touch" (Instrumental) 5.00
- 2nd 12” Single: VS761-12 Limited Edition Gatefold Sleeve
1. "Magic Touch" (Club Mix) 6.19
2. "Magic Touch" (Instrumental) 5.oo
3. "Emergency [Dial 999] (Dub Mix)
4. "Tell Me What You Want" (Extended Version)
- 3rd 12” Single: VS761-13
1. "Magic Touch" (Vibes Version) feat. Roy Ayres
2. "Magic Touch" (Vibes Instrumental) feat. Roy Ayres

== Charts ==
Chart (1985)	Peak position
UK Singles (OCC)	16

== Magic Touch 1992 ==
"Magic Touch (Eon Irving Mix)"

Single by Loose Ends

from the album Tighten Up Volume 1
- B-side: "Magic Touch (Original 7" Version)"
- Released: 31 August 1992 (UK)
- Recorded: May 1985
- Genre: R&B
- Label: Ten Records
- Songwriters: Carl McIntosh; Jane Eugene; Steve Nichol
- Producer: Nick Martinelli

Loose Ends singles chronology
"Hangin' On A String [Contemplating] (Frankie Knuckles Remix)" (1992)	"Magic Touch (Eon Irving Mix)" (1992)

"Magic Touch" was remixed and re-released in 1992. This and the additional tracks "A Little Spice" and "Choose Me" were taken from the Loose Ends Remix project "Tighten Up Volume 1".

=== Track listing ===
- 7” Single: TEN409
1. "Magic Touch" (7" Edit) 3.57
2. "Magic Touch" (Original 7" Version)
- 12” Single: TENX409
1. "Magic Touch" (12" Remix) 6.12
2. "Magic Touch" (Original 12" Version / Club Mix) 6.19
3. "Choose Me" (Eon Irving Mix / Sly's Eastern Promise Mix)
4. "A Little Spice" (Gang Starr Remix) 5.18
- CD Single: TENCD409
1. "Magic Touch" (7" Edit) 3.57
2. "Magic Touch" (12" Remix) 6.12
3. "Magic Touch" (Original 12" Version / Club Mix) 6.19
4. "A Little Spice" (Gang Starr Remix) 5.18

=== Charts ===
Chart (1992)	Peak position
UK Singles (OCC)	75
UK Dance (Music Week)	18
UK Club Chart (Music Week)	33
