= Zagora (album) =

Studio album by Loose Ends
- Released: May 7, 1986
- Recorded: 1985–1986
- Genre: R&B
- Length: 50:29
- Label: MCA Records
- Producer: Nick Martinelli

Loose Ends chronology
So Where Are You? (1985)	Zagora (1986)	The Real Chuckeeboo (1988)

Singles from Zagora
- 1. "Stay a Little While, Child" Released: 1986; 2. "Slow Down" Released: 1986; 3. "Nights of Pleasure" Released: 1986; 4. "Ooh, You Make Me Feel" Released: 1987; 5. "You Can't Stop the Rain" Released: 1987

Professional ratings
Review scores
Source	Rating
AllMusic	3/5 stars

Zagora is the third studio album by British R&B band Loose Ends, released in 1986 by MCA Records. The album spawned the hits "Slow Down", "Stay a Little While, Child" and two others, all of which were hits on the U.S. R&B charts, with "Slow Down" reaching number one on the chart. Between the years 1991-2009 the album sold an additional 303,000 copies in the United States according to Nielsen Soundscan 5 years after its initial release, the album remains uncertified with overall sales unknown.

== Track listing ==
=== European version ===
All tracks are written by Carl McIntosh, Steve Nichol and Jane Eugene, except where noted

Side one
No.	Title	Length
1.	"Stay a Little While, Child"	5:04
2.	"Be Thankful (Mama's Song)"	5:15
3.	"Slow Down"	5:01
4.	"Ooh, You Make Me Feel"	4:34
5.	"Just a Minute"	3:32

Side two
No.	Title	Writer(s)	Length
6.	"Who Are You?"		4:00
7.	"I Can't Wait"	Sam Bergliter, Carroll Thompson, Jane Eugene, Steve Nichol	4:54
8.	"Nights of Pleasure"		4:26
9.	"Let's Get Back to Love"		3:58
10.	"Rainbow" / "Take the "A" Train"	Carl McIntosh, Steve Nichol, Jane Eugene, Billy Strayhorn	6:43

=== North American version ===
All tracks are written by Carl McIntosh, Steve Nichol and Jane Eugene, except where noted

Side one
No.	Title	Writer(s)	Length
1.	"Stay a Little While, Child" (Remix)		8:11
2.	"Slow Down"		5:02
3.	"I Can't Wait (Another Minute)"	Sam Bergliter, Carroll Thompson, Jane Eugene, Carl McIntosh	4:53
4.	"Sweetest Pain"	Cynthia Biggs, Dexter Wansel	5:43

Side two
No.	Title	Length
5.	"Ooh, You Make Me Feel"	4:44
6.	"Who Are You?"	4:00
7.	"You Can't Stop the Rain"	4:20
8.	"Be Thankful (Mama's Song)"	5:15
9.	"Nights of Pleasure"	4:26
10.	"Let's Get Back to Love"	3:55

== Charts ==
Chart (1986)	Peak position
UK Albums	15
The Billboard 200	59
Top R&B/Hip-Hop Albums	7

=== Singles ===
Title	UK	US R&B
"Stay a Little While, Child"	52	18
"Slow Down"	27	1
"Nights of Pleasure"	42	58
"Ooh, You Make Me Feel"	77	—
"You Can't Stop the Rain"	—	32
