= Can You Feel the Force? =

Single by The Real Thing

from the album Can You Feel the Force?
- B-side: "Children of the Ghetto"
- Released: 26 January 1979
- Genre: Disco, soul
- Label: Pye Records
- Songwriter(s): Chris Amoo; Eddie Amoo
- Producer(s): Ken Gold

The Real Thing singles chronology
"Rainin' Through My Sunshine" (1978)	"Can You Feel the Force?" (1979)	"Boogie Down (Get Funky Now)" (1979)

"Can You Feel the Force?" is a song by British soul group The Real Thing, released as a single on 26 January 1979. It was written by band members Chris Amoo and his brother Eddie Amoo, and produced by Ken Gold for Tony Hall Productions and mastered at Sterling Sound. The song was the group's biggest disco hit, reaching number five in the UK Singles Chart and spending 11 weeks in the top 75, and also charting in a number of other countries. In March 1979 it was certified silver by the BPI for shipments of 250,000 copies.

In 1986 the song was remixed by Bob Mallett and charted again in the UK and Ireland.

== Charts ==
=== Weekly charts ===
Original version

Chart (1979)	Peak position
Belgium (Ultratop 50 Flanders)	15
Ireland (IRMA)	23
Netherlands (Dutch Top 40)	11
Netherlands (Single Top 100)	17
New Zealand (Recorded Music NZ)	24
UK Singles (OCC)	5

'86 Mix

Chart (1986)	Peak position
Ireland (IRMA)	17
UK Singles (OCC)	24

=== Year-end charts ===
Original version

Chart (1979)	Position
Belgium (Ultratop Flanders)	86
Netherlands (Dutch Top 40)	87
