= Slow Down (Loose Ends song) =

Single by Loose Ends

from the album Zagora
- B-side: "Slow Down (Slow Jam)"
- Released: September 22, 1986 (UK); September 24, 1986 (US)
- Recorded: 1986
- Genre: R&B
- Length: 4:06
- Label: MCA Records
- Songwriter(s): Carl McIntosh, Jane Eugene, Steve Nichol
- Producer(s): Nick Martinelli

Loose Ends singles chronology
"Stay a Little While, Child" (1986)	"Slow Down" (1986)	"Nights of Pleasure" (1986)

"Slow Down" is the 11th single by English R&B band Loose Ends from their third studio album, Zagora. It was released in September 1986 by MCA Records and produced by Loose Ends' longtime collaborator Nick Martinelli. The single was the group's second and last number one on the Soul Singles chart.

== Track listing ==
7” Single: VS884

1. "Slow Down" 4.06
2. "Slow Down (Slow Jam)" 3.11

12” Single: VS884-12

1. "Slow Down (Extended Version)" 7.31
2. "Slow Down (Slow Jam)" 7.08

2nd 12” Single: VS884-12 - limited edition with bonus 12"

1. "Slow Down (Extended Version)" 7.31
2. "Slow Down (Slow Jam)" 7.08
3. "Gonna Make You Mine (Westside Remix) 5.43 *
4. "Slow Down (Dub Version) 6.47

* The Westside Remix of 'Gonna Make You Mine' was released on CD in 1992 on the album 'Tighten Up Volume 1' remix project.

== Charts ==
Chart (1986/1987)	Peak Position
UK Singles Chart	27
U.S. Billboard Hot Black Singles	1
U.S. Billboard Hot Dance Club Play	42
