= Tell Me What You Want (Loose Ends song) =

Single by Loose Ends

from the album A Little Spice
- B-side: "Tell Me What You Want (Dub Mix)"
- Released: 1983 (Italy); February 1984 (UK)
- Recorded: 1983
- Genre: R&B, boogie
- Length: 3:35
- Label: Virgin Records
- Songwriter(s): Carl McIntosh, Ray Shell, Steve Nichol
- Producer(s): Nick Martinelli

Loose Ends singles chronology
"Don't Hold Back Your Love" (1983)	"Tell Me What You Want" (1983)	"Emergency (Dial 999)" (1984)

"Tell Me What You Want" is the fourth single by English R&B band Loose Ends from their first studio album, A Little Spice, and was released in February 1984 by Virgin Records. The single reached number 74 in the UK Singles Chart.

== Track listing ==
7” Single: VS658

1. "Tell Me What You Want) 3.35
2. "Tell Me What You Want (Dub Mix)" 3.34

12” Single: VS658-12

1. "Tell Me What You Want (Extended Version)" 6.11
2. "Tell Me What You Want (Extended Dub Mix)" 5.41

U.S. only release - 12” Single: MCA23596 (released 1985)

1. "Tell Me What You Want (U.S. Extended Remix)" 6.08 *
2. "Tell Me What You Want (U.S. Dub Version)" 5.18

* The U.S. Extended Remix version was released on CD on the U.S. Version of the 'A Little Spice' album (MCAD27141).

The Extended Version also featured on Side D of the limited gatefold sleeve version of 'Magic Touch'

== Chart performance ==
Chart (1984)	Peak position
UK Singles Chart	74
