= Look How Long =

1990 studio album by Loose Ends

Studio album by Loose Ends
- Released: 13 November 1990
- Genre: R&B
- Length: 46:53
- Label: 10/Virgin; MCA
- Producer: Carl McIntosh

Loose Ends chronology
The Real Chuckeeboo (1988)	Look How Long (1990)

Singles from Look How Long
- 1. "Don't Be a Fool" Released: 26 October 1990; 2. "Cheap Talk" Released: 11 February 1991; 3. "Love's Got Me" Released: 17 May 1991

Professional ratings
Review scores
Source	Rating
AllMusic	3/5 stars
Record Mirror	3.5/5 stars
Select	2/5 medals

Look How Long is the fifth and final studio album by British contemporary R&B group Loose Ends; released on 13 November 1990 via 10 Records (which was distributed via Virgin Records) in the United Kingdom and MCA Records in the United States. The album peaked at #124 on the Billboard 200 and #28 on the Billboard R&B chart in 1990. Produced by band member Carl McIntosh, it is the only album from the band to not feature original members Jane Eugene and Steve Nichol; they both left the band following their previous album The Real Chuckeeboo and were subsequently replaced by Linda Carriere and Sunay Suleyman both contributing singers & songwriter on the album.

Three singles were released from Look How Long: "Don't Be a Fool", "Cheap Talk" and "Love's Got Me". "Don't Be a Fool" was the most successful single from the album, peaking at #10 on the Billboard R&B chart in 1990.

== Track listing ==
All lyrics are written by Carl McIntosh and Sunay Suleyman; all music is composed by Carl McIntosh (except where noted).

No.	Title	Writer(s)	Length
1.	"Don't Be a Fool"		4:20
2.	"Don't You Ever (Try to Change Me)"		4:28
3.	"Love's Got Me"		3:34
4.	"Try My Love"		4:03
5.	"Time Is Ticking"		4:45
6.	"Look How Long"	Linda Carriere; Carl McIntosh	3:44
7.	"Cheap Talk"		4:00
8.	"I Don't Need to Love"		4:03
9.	"Hold Tight"		4:57
10.	"Love Controversy, Pt. 1"		3:27
11.	"Symptoms of Love"		1:22
12.	"Let's Wax a Fatty (Bonus track)"	Carl McIntosh	4:10
Total length:			46:53

Notes

- Track 12 only available on US CD version.

== Charts ==
=== Weekly charts ===
Chart (1990)	Peak position
UK Albums (OCC)	19
US Billboard 200	124
US Top R&B/Hip-Hop Albums (Billboard)	28

=== Year-end charts ===
Chart (1991)	Position
US Top R&B/Hip-Hop Albums (Billboard)	83
