= Love's Such a Wonderful Thing =

Single by The Real Thing

from the album 4 from 8
- B-side: "Topsy Turvy"
- Released: 1977
- Genre: Soul, Pop
- Label: Pye Records 7N 45701
- Songwriter(s): Chris Amoo, Eddie Amoo
- Producer(s): Chris & Eddie Amoo for Tony Hall Productions

"Love's Such a Wonderful Thing" is a song released in 1977 by the UK band The Real Thing taken from their album 4 from 8. The song peaked at #33 on the UK Singles Chart.

== Background ==
The song was written, arranged and produced by brothers Chris Amoo and Eddie Amoo. The B side "Topsy Turvy" was written by the Amoo brothers but produced and arranged by Jerome Rimson.

== Samplings of "So Much Love to Give" ==
The song contains the lyrics "I've got so much love to give". The phrase and music has become popular by various DJ and music producers and subject of many adaptations.

The French house duo Together, consisting of Thomas Bangalter and DJ Falcon used the line and music in their release "So Much Love to Give". The 12" single released in 2002 contains the sample, repeating it throughout the song.

The sample was also used by Freeloaders in their 2005 single also titled "So Much Love to Give", which reached #9 on the UK chart.

The music segment but without the actual usage of the phrase "So much love" was utilized in Uniting Nations 2005 hit "You and Me"

The sample for "So Much Love" was also used by Fedde Le Grand in his song "So Much Love" in 2011.

The Hungarian deep house / progressive house DJs Muzzaik & Stadiumx used it in their song "So Much Love" in 2016.
