= The Real Chuckeeboo =

Studio album by Loose Ends
- Released: June 18, 1988
- Recorded: 1987–1988
- Genre: R&B, pop, dance
- Label: MCA Records
- Producer: Nick Martinelli For Watchout Productions

Loose Ends chronology
Zagora (1986)	The Real Chuckeeboo (1988)	Look How Long (1990)

Singles from The Real Chuckeeboo
- 1. "Mr. Bachelor" Released: 1988; 2. "Watching You" Released: 1988; 3. "Life" Released: 1989

Professional ratings
Review scores
Source	Rating
AllMusic	2.5/5 stars
Robert Christgau	B+

The Real Chuckeeboo is the fourth album by British R&B group Loose Ends. It is the last album to feature all three original members; Carl McIntosh, Jane Eugene and Steve Nichol. Mainly written and produced by Loose Ends and co-produced by longtime collaborator Nick Martinelli, it also features contributions from Leon Ware and Caron Wheeler.

The Real Chuckeeboo reached #52 in the United Kingdom. In the USA it peaked at #16 on the R&B chart and #80 on the Billboard albums chart. Between the years 1991-2009 the album sold an additional 48,000 copies in the United States according to Nielsen Soundscan 3 years after its initial release, the album remains uncertified with overall sells unknown.

== Track listing ==
All tracks are written by Carl McIntosh, Jane Eugene and Steve Nichol, except where noted

Side one
No.	Title	Length
1.	"Watching You"	4:35
2.	"(There's No) Gratitude"	5:21
3.	"The Real Chuckeeboo" ("Tomorrow" / "Mr. Bachelor" / "You've Just Got to Have It All")	10:59

Side two
No.	Title	Writer(s)	Length
4.	"Life"		4:05
5.	"What Goes Around"		5:00
6.	"Easier Said Than Done"	Carl McIntosh, Jane Eugene, Steve Nichol, Leon Ware	5:40
7.	"Hungry"		4:56
8.	"Is It Ever Too Late?"	Carl McIntosh, Jane Eugene, Steve Nichol, Sam Bergliter, Stephen Dante	4:52
9.	"Remote Control"		5:13

European bonus tracks
No.	Title	Length
10.	"Until a Tear Becomes a Rose"	6:54
11.	"Too Much"	4:05
12.	"Johnny Broadhead (Part 2)"	6:30

North American bonus tracks
No.	Title	Length
10.	"Magic Eyes"	5:15
11.	"Until a Tear"	5:48

== Charts ==
Chart (1988)	Peak position
UK Albums	52
Billboard 200	80
Billboard Top R&B/Hip-Hop Albums	16
Blues & Soul Top British Soul Albums	7

=== Singles ===
Title	UK	US R&B
"Mr. Bachelor"	50	11
"Watching You"	83	2
"Life"	—	32
