= The Real Thing (British band) =

British soul group

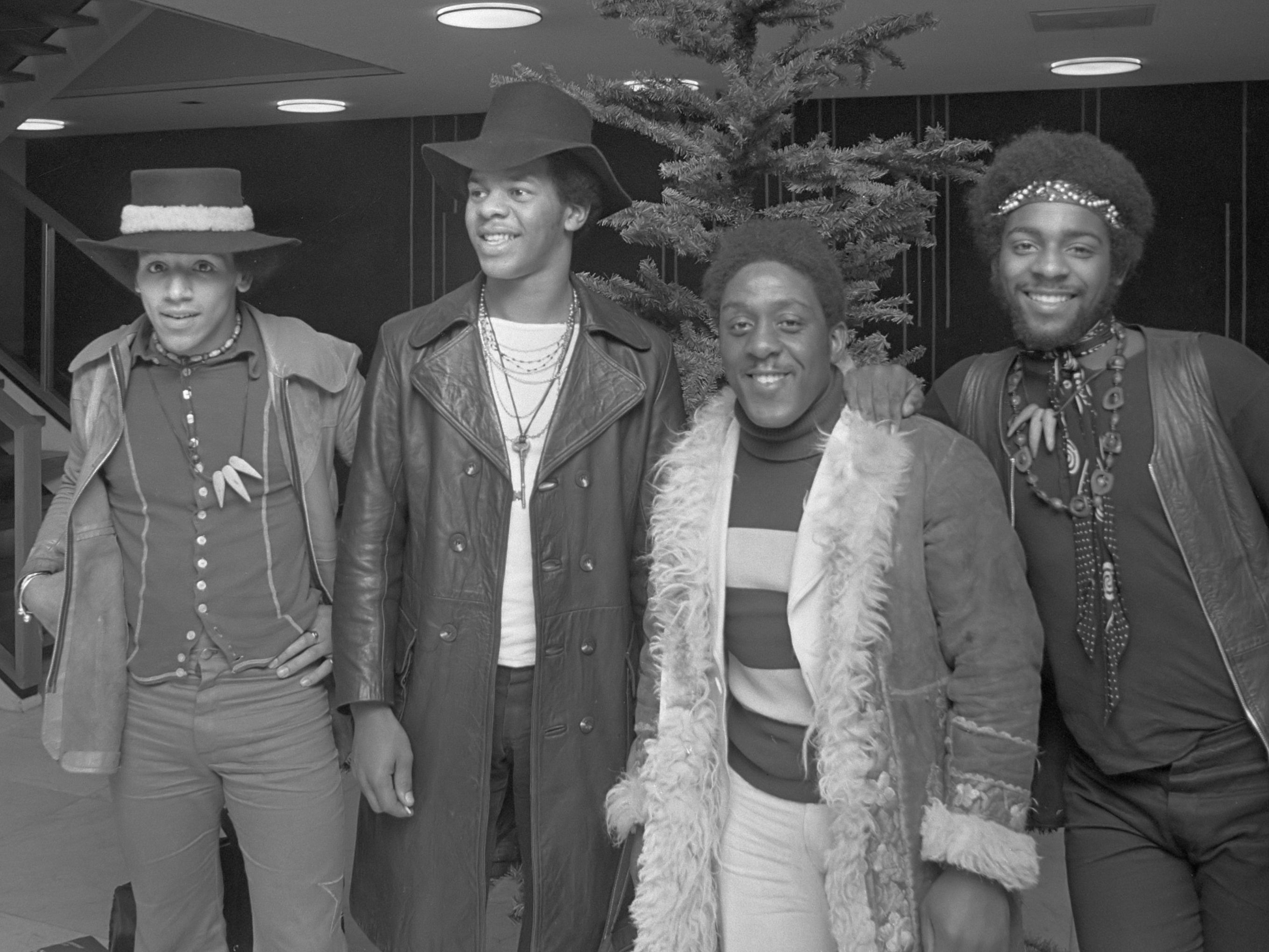
- The Real Thing (1972) left to right: Ray Lake, Dave Smith, Kenny Davis, Chris Amoo

Background information
- Origin: Liverpool, England
- Genres: British soul; Brit funk; disco; R&B
- Years active: 1970–present
- Labels: Pye, Calibre, Jive
- Members: Chris Amoo; Dave Smith
- Past members: Ray Lake; Kenny Davis; Eddie Amoo

The Real Thing are a British soul group formed in the 1970s. The band charted internationally with their song "You to Me Are Everything", which reached No. 1 on the UK Singles Chart. They also had successes with a string of British hits such as "Can't Get By Without You" and "Can You Feel the Force?". They returned to mainstream success in 1986 with the Decade Remix of "You to Me Are Everything". By number of sales, they were the most successful black rock/soul act in England during the 1970s. The journalist, author and founder of Mojo magazine Paul Du Noyer credits them alongside Deaf School with restoring "Liverpool's musical reputation in the 1970s" with their success.

== History ==
Founded in 1970 by Chris Amoo, Dave Smith, Kenny Davis and Ray Lake, the Real Thing's live, progressive soul-influenced covers of American hits attracted enough attention for them to secure a recording deal with EMI. The singles they released through EMI in 1972 and 1973 such as "Vicious Circle" were, despite their high quality, not successful sellers (and have not so far been included on any of the band's compilation albums). But the band persisted, even after the departure of Kenny Davis. They did appear on Opportunity Knocks (the TV talent show). The turn-around for their career began with their collaboration with David Essex and Pye Records. They toured internationally with Essex, recording with him a number of popular songs, though none were big charters. After Chris Amoo's brother Eddie joined the band, the Real Thing finally found chart success with the pop-soul single "You to Me Are Everything", which reached No. 1 on the UK Singles Chart, No. 29 on Billboard's "R&B Singles" and No. 64 on Billboard's "Hot 100". The song was certified silver for 250,000 in sales. Their follow-up, "Can't Get By Without You", did not chart in the US but was still a success in the United Kingdom, where it reached number 2.

In 1976, they released their first album, Real Thing. The album included both of their hit singles as well as a third UK hit, "You'll Never Know What You're Missing", which peaked at No. 16. They continued recording prolifically, releasing a steady stream of subsequent albums: 1977's Four from Eight (originally to have been called Liverpool 8 in honour of the racially mixed, economically depressed neighbourhood in which they grew up, before Pye rejected the title), 1978's Step into Our World, (reissued in 1979 as Can You Feel the Force) and 1982's compilation 100 Minutes. During the time period, they accumulated eight more British hits. "Love's Such a Wonderful Thing" peaked at No. 33 in 1977. 1978 saw "Whenever You Want My Love" at No. 18, "Let's Go Disco" at No. 39 and "Rainin' Through My Sunshine" at No. 40. "Can You Feel the Force?" climbed to No. 5 in 1979, the same year that "Boogie Down (Get Funky Now)" hit No. 33. 1980's "She's a Groovy Freak" capped a successful run, at No. 52, coming just a few months too late to be included in the band's first compilation, a K-tel collection of their Greatest Hits released in May 1980.

In 1982, they returned to working with David Essex, performing as backing vocalists on his tour and they also performed as backing vocalists on Essex's 1982 top 20 hit "Me and My Girl (Nightclubbing)" appearing with him on Top of the Pops.

After a label change to RCA, they scored a dance-floor hit, reaching No. 50 on the Music Week "Top Disco & Dance Songs" chart as well as No. 58 on the UK Disco chart published in Record Mirror and radio playlisted with a single specially written for them by Lynsey De Paul and Terry Britten, called "We Got Love (Real Thing)" produced by Nick Martinelli in 1984. The song received positive reviews, spending 6 weeks on the UK Top 200 charts and peaking at peaking at #118. The song was included on a greatest hits of 1984 compilation released by Team Records in Indonesia as well as on the album Black Magic.

In 1986, the band enjoyed another chart resurgence with the remixing of several of their hits. "You to Me Are Everything (The Decade Remix)" by DJ Froggy, Simon Harris and KC charted twice in the UK, peaking at No. 5 during a 12-week run in spring and returning in June for an additional week at No. 72. "Can't Get By Without You (the Second Decade Remix)" rose almost as high to No. 6, remaining for a consecutive 13 weeks. "Can You Feel the Force" ('86 Remix) climbed to No. 24, but the band's final UK charter for the year, "Straight to the Heart", peaked at No. 71, remaining for only two weeks.

Original member Kenny Davis died from drowning aged 44.

Ray Lake took his own life on 9 March 2000. He was suffering from a heroin addiction.

In 2002, Daft Punk's Thomas Bangalter teamed up with DJ Falcon to release a single under the name of Together, which sampled the Real Thing's 1977 song "Love's Such a Wonderful Thing". The song was entitled "So Much Love to Give". It became a big club hit (though the single only peaked at No. 71 in the UK charts for Bangalter & Falcon), so much so that a number of other dance records used the same sample over the following years. One of these releases was by N-Trance's Kevin O'Toole and Dale Longworth, who covered "So Much Love to Give" under the name of Freeloaders and released it as a single crediting the Real Thing's vocal contribution unlike the earlier French duo's release. The single, released by AATW in 2005, peaked at No. 9 in the UK charts, giving The Real Thing their sixth Top Ten hit (including remixes) and last hit single.

Eddie Amoo died on 23 February 2018.

On 28 January 2022, the duo released their first album in over 40 years.

== Everything – The Real Thing Story ==
In 2019, the band were featured in a documentary called Everything – The Real Thing Story directed by Simon Sheridan, which charted the history of the band from Eddie's days in Merseybeat doo-wop act the Chants (said to be the only group ever to be backed by the Beatles), through Chris' group's SSB (the Sophisticated Soul Brothers) and Vocal Perfection. The latter act went on to be renamed The Real Thing by manager Tony Hall, after seeing the Coca-Cola advert on a large billboard in Piccadilly Circus. The documentary featured interviews with David Essex, Billy Ocean, Five Star's Denise Pearson, Kim Wilde and Leee John from Imagination; as well as all surviving members of the Chants and the Real Thing. As Eddie Amoo died during the production of the film, the documentary ended up being released two years after his death. After a theatrical run, the film was screened on BBC Four in August 2020.

== Group members ==
Current

- Chris Amoo (born Christopher Charles Amoo, 14 October 1952, Liverpool) – vocals (1972–present)
- Dave Smith (born David Smith, 6 July 1952) – vocals (1972–present)

Real Thing Band

- John Chapman – saxophone/percussion
- Sam Edwards – keyboards
- Stuart Ansell – guitar
- Jon Bower – bass
- Danny Rose – drums

Former

- Ray Lake (born Raymond Brian Lake, 11 February 1952, Liverpool; died 9 March 2000, Bristol) – falsetto backing vocals (1972–1991)
- Kenny Davis – vocals (1972–1974)
- Eddie Amoo (born Edward Robert Amoo, 5 May 1944, Liverpool; died 23 February 2018, Melbourne, Australia) – vocals, guitars (1975–2018)

== Discography ==
The Real Thing discography
- Studio albums: 5
- Live albums: 2
- Compilation albums: 4
- Singles: 37

=== Albums ===
Studio albums

Year	Title	Chart positions		Certifications
Year	Title	UK	AUS	Certifications
1976	Real Thing	34	70	BPI: Silver
1977	4 from 8	—	—	
1978	Step into Our World/Can You Feel the Force	73	—	
1980	....Saints or Sinners?	—	—	
2022	A Brand New Day	—	—	
"—" denotes releases that did not chart or were not released in that territory.

Live albums

Year	Title
1994	The Heart Rock Concert at the Philharmonic
1998	The Real Thing Live

Compilation albums

Year	Title	Chart positions	Certifications
Year	Title	UK	Certifications
1980	20 Greatest Hits	56	
1982	100 Minutes	—	
1986	The Best of the Real Thing	24	BPI: Silver
2020	Best of the Real Thing	58	

=== Singles ===
Year	Title	Album	Chart positions						Certifications
Year	Title	Album	UK	AUS	IRL	NZ	US Pop	US R&B	Certifications
1972	"Vicious Circle"	Non-album singles	—	—	—	—	—	—	
1973	"Plastic Man"	Non-album singles	—	—	—	—	—	—	
1973	"Listen, Joe Mcgintoo"	Non-album singles	—	—	—	—	—	—	
1973	"Humpty Dumpty"	Non-album singles	—	—	—	—	—	—	
1974	"Daddy Dear"	Non-album singles	—	—	—	—	—	—	
1975	"Watch Out Carolina"	Non-album singles	—	—	—	—	—	—	
1975	"Stone Cold Love Affair"	Non-album singles	—	—	—	—	—	—	
1976	"You to Me Are Everything"	Real Thing	1	22	3	10	64	28	BPI: Platinum
1976	"Can't Get By Without You"	Real Thing	2	—	—	—	—	—	BPI: Silver
1977	"You'll Never Know What You're Missing"	Real Thing	16	—	—	—	—	—	
1977	"Love's Such a Wonderful Thing"	Real Thing	33	—	—	—	—	—	
1977	"Lightning Strikes Again"	4 from 8	51 (Note: Chart position is from the official UK "Breakers List".)	—	—	—	—	—	
1978	"Whenever You Want My Love"	Step into Our World / Can You Feel the Force	18	—	—	—	—	—	
1978	"Let's Go Disco"	Non-album single	39	—	—	—	—	—	
1978	"Rainin' Through My Sunshine"	Step into Our World / Can You Feel the Force	40	—	—	—	—	—	
1979	"Can You Feel the Force?"	Step into Our World / Can You Feel the Force	5	—	23	24	—	—	BPI: Silver
1979	"Boogie Down (Get Funky Now)"	....Saints or Sinners?	33	—	—	46	—	—	
1980	"Give Me Your Love"	....Saints or Sinners?	—	—	—	—	—	—	
1980	"Saint or Sinner?"	....Saints or Sinners?	—	—	—	—	—	—	
1980	"She's a Groovy Freak"	Non-album singles	52	—	—	—	—	—	
1981	"I Believe in You"	Non-album singles	—	—	—	—	—	—	
1981	"Foot Tappin'"	Non-album singles	—	—	—	—	—	—	
1982	"Love Takes Tears"	Non-album singles	—	—	—	—	—	—	
1982	"Seen to Smile"	Non-album singles	—	—	—	—	—	—	
1983	"Street Corner Boogie"	Non-album singles	—	—	—	—	—	—	
1984	"We Got Love"	Non-album singles	118	—	—	—	—	—	
1984	"Street Scene"	Non-album singles	—	—	—	—	—	—	
1986	"You to Me Are Everything (The Decade Remix 76–86)"	Non-album singles	5	—	6	2	—	—	
1986	"Can't Get By Without You" (The Decade Remix II)	Non-album singles	6	—	8	—	—	—	
1986	"Can You Feel the Force?" ('86 Remix)	Non-album singles	24	—	17	—	—	—	
1986	"Straight to the Heart"	Non-album singles	71	—	—	—	—	—	
1987	"Hard Times"	Non-album singles	90	—	—	—	—	—	
1987	"I Can't Help Myself (Sugar Pie Honey Bunch)"	Non-album singles	—	—	—	—	—	—	
1989	"The Crime of Love"	—	—	—	—	—	—		
1993	"I Love Music"	—	—	—	—	—	—		
2005	"So Much Love to Give" (with Freeloaders)	Freshly Squeezed (Freeloaders album)	9	—	30	—	—	—	
2005	"You to Me Are Everything" (with Darren Deezer)	Non-album single	—	—	—	—	—	—	
"—" denotes releases that did not chart or were not released in that territory.

== See also ==
- List of disco artists (S–Z)
- Brit funk
- Jazz-funk
- List of bands and artists from Merseyside
- List of artists who reached number one on the UK Singles Chart
- List of performers on Top of the Pops
