= Tell Me What You Want (Weezer song) =

Single by Weezer
- Released: June 11, 2021
- Studio: The Village (West Hollywood)
- Genre: Surf rock; hard rock
- Length: 3:23
- Label: Atlantic; Crush
- Songwriter: Rivers Cuomo
- Producer: Suzy Shinn

Weezer singles chronology
"I Need Some of That" (2021)	"Tell Me What You Want" (2021)	"A Little Bit of Love" (2022)

"Tell Me What You Want" is a song by American band Weezer, written for the video game Wave Break. It was released as a single on June 11, 2021.

== Background and release ==
For the song, Weezer partnered with Funktronic Labs, the indie video game developers responsible for Wave Break, "the world's first skateBOATING game, inspired by arcade skateboarding classics". A "Weezy Mode" was added to the game, based around the song. "Tell Me What You Want" first surfaced as a B-side cut from Weezer's fifteenth studio album, Van Weezer. It was created as a "stream-safe option" so that livestreamers on platforms like Twitch would not get copyright claims while playing Wave Break.

The song premiered at the 2021 Summer Game Fest on June 10, 2021, with a live performance from Weezer. It was officially released a day later, with a vinyl release via iam8bit that was released in spring 2022.

== Composition ==
NME's Matt Doria declared the song "simmers with a sharp, metal-via-surf-rock edge", while Stereogum's Chris DeVille said it "continues Van Weezer's hard-rocking, riff-driven aesthetic".

The song directly criticizes the music website Pitchfork, with the lyrics: "This is a message that my manager wouldn’t approve/ After this song, he'll have a lot of cleaning up to do/ Don't be influenced by an office full of dorks/ I won't mention any names [cough cough] Pitchfork." Wren Graves of Consequence of Sound believes the song is a response to Pitchfork's 5.9/10 review of the band previous album, Van Weezer. He noted that, since about 2005, the website always give mediocre ratings to Weezer albums.

== Reception ==
According to Josiah Hughes of Exclaim!, "dunking on Pitchfork is something that has been happening since the music site's inception, making Weezer seem a little out of touch for bringing it up now."
