= Can't Get By Without You =

1976 single by British band The Real Thing

Single by The Real Thing

from the album Real Thing
- B-side: "(He's Just A) Moneymaker"
- Released: 27 August 1976
- Genre: Disco, soul
- Length: 3:24
- Label: Pye Records
- Songwriter(s): Ken Gold and Mickey Denne
- Producer(s): Ken Gold for Tony Hall Productions

The Real Thing singles chronology
"You to Me Are Everything" (1976)	"Can't Get By Without You" (1976)	"You'll Never Know What You're Missing" (1977)

"Can't Get By Without You" is a song by British soul group The Real Thing, released in 1976. It was the follow-up to their hit "You to Me Are Everything".

== Background ==
The song was written by Ken Gold and Mickey Denne and released on Pye 7N 45618. The B-side, "(He's Just A) Moneymaker", was written by Chris and Eddie Amoo. The song had a similar feel to the group's previous hit, but still reached no. 2 in the UK charts, kept from no. 1 by ABBA's "Dancing Queen". "Can't Get By Without You" did not make any real chart impression in the US. On the week ending 16 October 1976, in the UK charts the song dropped from no. 2 to no. 3.

In 1986, a remixed version of the song "Can't Get By Without You (The Second Decade Remix)", backed by "She's a Groovy Freak", was released on the PRT label.
