= Eddie Amoo =

- Born: Edward Robert Amoo; 4 May 1944; Toxteth, Liverpool, England, UK
- Died: 23 February 2018 (aged 73) Melbourne, Australia
- Genres: doo-wop, soul
- Instruments: Vocals, guitar
- Years active: 1962–2018
- Formerly of: The Chants, The Real Thing

Edward Robert Amoo (4 May 1944 — 23 February 2018) was a British musician. He was a member of The Real Thing, and was the older brother of the band's lead singer, Chris.

== Early life ==
Amoo was born in Toxteth, Liverpool to Robert and Moya Amoo. Robert was a seaman from Ghana. He attended his first concert at age fifteen, when he mother took him to see Frankie Lymon & The Teenagers, who he saw as a "role model" in music. In the early 1960s, he was sent to Borstal after he was caught with a knife.

== Career ==
Amoo was a member of the doo wop group The Chants, with Joey and Edmund Ankrah, Alan Harding and Nat Smeeda. They were briefly managed by Brian Epstein and were given positive support from John Lennon. They were signed to Pye Records. The Chants are believed to be the only group to have been backed by The Beatles. The group was active for thirteen years but despite releasing many records never had a hit: "they had no idea what to do with a black doo-wop group, they just had no idea".

After The Chants disbanded, Eddie joined The Real Thing, led by his younger brother Chris. The band first gained attraction prior to Eddie joining after appearing on Opportunity Knocks. The group had a number one in 1976 with "You to Me Are Everything", and a follow up, "Can't Get By Without You", which peaked at number two.

A documentary about the band directed by Simon Sheridan was broadcast in 2019. Amoo worked on the documentary but died before its release.

== Personal life ==
In 1964, he married his wife Sylvia and had four daughters. He also had grandchildren and a great-grandchild. He was friends with actor Paul Barber.

Amoo died suddenly at The Alfred Hospital in Melbourne, Australia, where he was visiting family on 23 February 2018 aged 73. A coroner ruled his death was from natural causes, namely a retroperitoneal hemorrhage in the left adrenal pheochromocytoma.
