= Chris Amoo =

British singer-songwriter (born 1952)

- Born: Christopher Charles Amoo; 14 October 1952 (age 74)
- Origin: Liverpool, England
- Genres: R&B, soul
- Occupations: Singer, songwriter, dog competition judge, dog breeder
- Years active: 1970s–present

Christopher Charles Amoo (born 14 October 1952) is a British singer-songwriter, and the lead singer of English soul group, The Real Thing.

== Background ==
Amoo was born on 14 October 1952 in Liverpool, England. He comes from a mixed-race background, with a Ghanaian grandfather and an Irish grandmother. His elder brother Eddie Amoo was also a member of The Real Thing; he died on 23 February 2018. Amoo is married to Julie Amoo née Mello.

== Music ==
=== The Real Thing ===
As a member of The Real Thing, he achieved success with "You to Me Are Everything," "Can't Get By Without You," and "Can You Feel the Force?"

In March 1977, his song "You'll Never Know What You're Missing" was ranked No. 23 in the Billboard chart, having been at No. 20 the previous week.

=== Solo ===
In 1981, his single "This Must Be Love," (a Phil Collins composition) b/w "You'll Never Know What You're Missing" was released on the Precision label. In March 1984, a single recorded with Debby Bishop was released on EMI. The song "No Choir of Angels" was backed with "Love Talk." In April of that year, along with Alan Price and others, he appeared in the final episode of a show hosted by Marti Caine.

== Discography ==
Singles
Title	Release info	Year	Notes
"This Must Be Love" / "You'll Never Know What You're Missing"	Precision PAR 118	1981	
" No Choir of Angels" / "Love Talk"	EMI 5455	1984	Credited to Chris Amoo and Debby Bishop
A1. "You To Me Are Everything" (Disco Dude Mix), A2. "You To Me Are Everything" (Disco Universal Dub) B1. "You To Me Are Everything" (Album Version), B2. "You To Me Are Everything" (Disco Instrumental)	Polydor SUNLPR 01	1998	Credited to Sunzet featuring Chris Amoo of the Real Thing

== Dog shows ==
As a dog breeder, he and his wife Julie Amoo entered their Afghan Hound, named Viscount Grant, into Crufts dog show, where it won the 1987 Best in Show title. That year, he also served as one of the Easter Team Match judges at The Junior Handlers Club.

At Crufts 2013, their Afghan hound won third place in its class.

In 2015, he judged the Irish Wolfhound, Levriero irlandese – 25th French Breed Show event.

In May 2016, he was on the judging panel at the CAC show. He also served as a judge at E.I.W.C 2016.

== Television ==
List
Title	Episode	Role	Director / Producer	Year	Notes #
Marti	Episode #5.5	Himself	Brian Whitehouse (Dir.), Stewart Morris (Prod.)	1984	Host: Marti Caine<
Crufts 88		Himself	Neil Eccles (Prod.)	1988	
After They Were Famous	Episode #2.4	Himself		2000	
Hit Me Baby 1 More Time	Episode #1.4	Himself		2005	

== Radio ==
List
Title	Episode	Role	Director / Producer	Year	Notes #
Motown on the Mersey		Himself	James Crawford (Prod.)	2007	

== Film ==
List
Title	Episode	Role	Director / Producer	Year	Notes #
Everything - The Real Thing Story		Himself	Simon Sheridan (Prod.)	2019	Broadcast on BBC Four in August 2020
