= Nick Martinelli =

American R&B and pop record producer (born 1952)

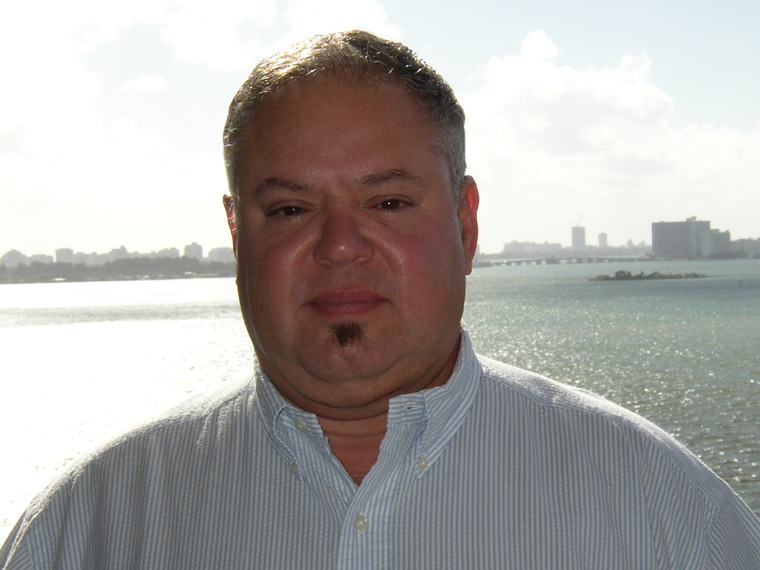
- Nick Martinelli - 2004

Background information
- Born: Nicholas J. Martinelli; 5 July 1952 (age 74)
- Origin: Philadelphia, United States
- Genres: Pop; Contemporary R&B post-disco
- Years active: 1979–present
- Labels: Virgin Records; WMOT Records; West End Records; Prelude Records

Nicholas J. Martinelli (born 1952) is an American R&B and pop record producer. During the 1980s he worked with many R&B and pop music artists, some of them based in the UK. Acts he has worked with include Loose Ends, Phyllis Hyman, Five Star, Stephanie Mills and Regina Belle.

== Early history ==
Martinelli cut his teeth as a teenager in 1969 in the Chips warehouse, an independent record distributor for Motown. He was promoted to warehouse manager as he developed an understanding of distribution and retail sales. In 1977, Motown rewarded Nick's diligence by giving him additional responsibilities handling dance promotion for the Northeast region covering the territory from New York to Washington.

It was in the clubs that Martinelli found an outlet to express himself creatively—behind the turntables. In 1978, WMOT Records hired him for a national sales position, transitioning to an A&R position a year later. This enabled him to sign and develop new talent on the Philadelphia scene at the time.

Influenced by "The Sound of Philadelphia", Martinelli credits Dexter Wansel for his technical studio training. Although Martinelli and WMOT did well in America with Frankie Smith's "Double Dutch Bus," it took a trip overseas for him to create a niche with his production style; he produced "Act Like You Know" and co-produced "Zoom" for Fat Larry's Band, and it rose to the top of the British pop singles chart in 1982. Martinelli then spent two years remixing many hits for various artists, including the Ray Parker Jr. hit, "Ghostbusters".

Martinelli also produced and mixed a record by seminal female rapper Lady B called "To the Beat Y'all". The music was actually from another song that Martinelli produced, "Everybody Here Must Party" by the sibling girl group Direct Current. It peaked at number 21 on Billboard's Disco Chart in April 1979.

Throughout the 80's and 90's Martinelli continued his streak by producing an array of hits for a variety of artists.

== 1980s ==
Martinelli is perhaps best known for working with the successful English R&B band Loose Ends during the mid-1980s when he produced two of their all-time biggest-selling albums, So Where Are You? in 1985 and Zagora in 1986. So Where Are You? included Loose Ends' biggest hit to date, "Hangin' on a String (Contemplating)," which reached number one on the Billboard Hot R&B/Hip-Hop Songs chart. Zagora featured another highly successful hit, "Slow Down," which also reached number one on the same chart. He also worked with members of Loose Ends on Five Star's debut album Luxury of Life, released in 1985, which included the R&B hits "All Fall Down" (number 16 in 1985), and "Let Me Be the One" (number two in 1986).

In the mid-'80s, Martinelli's accomplishments continued, producing some of the most talented signature vocalists in music, including Stephanie Mills (with No. 1 singles for "I Feel Good All Over" and "Home"), Gladys Knight & the Pips (All Our Love' album—gold), Teddy Pendergrass (#1 Joy album—gold), and Miki Howard (#1 single with "Love Under New Management" and "Baby Be Mine").

In 1989, Martinelli was sentenced to three years in prison for dealing cocaine in the early part of the decade.

== 1990s ==
Martinelli entered the 1990s with Regina Belle's No. 1 album Stay with Me spawning two No. 1 hit singles, one of which garnered a Grammy nomination ("Make It Like It Was"). Long-time mentor Kenny Gamble selected him to work with Phyllis Hyman, having written two selections for Hyman, including the Top 10 single, "When You Get Right Down to It," as well as her No. 1 R&B hit "Don't Wanna Change the World". In 1993, Martinelli relocated to Los Angeles, where he wrote and produced songs for Jomanda, Regina Belle, Robin S., Howard Hewett, Gerald Alston, Lulu, RuPaul, Chaka Khan, Chris Walker, and his lifelong idol Diana Ross.

He achieved quadruple Platinum status with his new productions on the Diana Ross greatest-hits One Woman Collection. In 1994 he branched out by producing a BPI-certified Gold symphonic Christmas CD, A Very Special Season for Diana Ross in the U.K. In early 1995, Martinelli was called back to London to produce the original cast album for the hit musical Mama, I Want to Sing!, starring Chaka Khan.

== Accolades ==
In 1988, Martinelli received the Philadelphia Music Foundation Award for notching the most Top 10 singles in one year. Two years later they honored him again by naming him Best Urban Producer. In the U.K. he was always included in the Blues and Soul Top 10 producer list.

== Selected discography ==
- 1982: Fat Larry's Band - "Act Like You Know"
- 1984: The Real Thing - "We Got Love"
- 1985: Loose Ends - "Hangin' on a String (Contemplating)"
- 1985: Five Star - "Let Me Be the One"
- 1985: 52nd Street - "Tell Me (How It Feels)"
- 1986: Phyllis Hyman - "Ain't You Had Enough Love"
- 1986: Loose Ends - "Slow Down"
- 1987: Miki Howard - "Baby Be Mine"
- 1987: Sheena Easton - "The Last To Know"
- 1988: Miki Howard - "Love Under New Management"
- 1988: Teddy Pendergrass - "This is the Last Time"
- 1989: Stephanie Mills - "Home"
- 1989: Kiara and Shanice Wilson - "This Time"
- 1991: Phyllis Hyman - "Don't Wanna Change The World"
- 1991: Chris Walker - "Giving You All My Love"
- 1992: Regina Belle: "If I Could"
- 1993: Jomanda: "After All This Love"
