= The 'Burbs (TV series) =

American television series

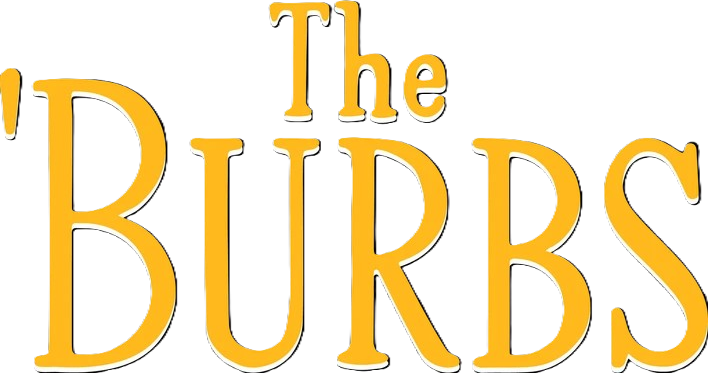
- Genre: Comedy-drama
- Created by: Celeste Hughey
- Based on: The 'Burbs by Dana Olsen
- Starring: Jack Whitehall; Keke Palmer; Kapil Talwalkar; Julia Duffy; Paula Pell; Mark Proksch
- Music by: Michael Abels; Robert Wallace
- Country of origin: United States
- Original language: English
- No. of seasons: 1
- No. of episodes: 8

Production
- Executive producers: Nzingha Stewart; Bonnie Muñoz; Rachel Shukert; Celeste Hughey; Keke Palmer; Kristen Zolner; Natalie Berkus; Aimee Carlson; Erica Huggins; Seth MacFarlane; Brian Grazer
- Cinematography: Jonathan Furmanski
- Editors: Jim Flynn; Joseph Ettinger; Alexander Aquino-Kaljakin
- Running time: 35–48 minutes
- Production companies: Fuzzy Door Productions; Out of the Blue Productions; Imagine Entertainment; Universal Content Productions (season 1); Universal Global Television (season 2)

Original release
- Network: Peacock
- Release: February 8, 2026 – present

The 'Burbs is an American comedy-drama television series created by Celeste Hughey for Peacock. It is an adaptation of the 1989 film of the same name and stars Jack Whitehall and Keke Palmer. The series premiered on February 8, 2026. In April 2026, the series was renewed for a second season.

== Premise ==
Old secrets resurface when a newly married couple relocate to the suburban neighborhood of the husband's youth.

== Cast and characters ==
=== Main ===
- Jack Whitehall as Rob Fisher, Samira's husband who is a book editor
- Keke Palmer as Samira Fisher, Rob's wife who is an attorney
- Kapil Talwalkar as Naveen Varma, Rob's childhood best friend
- Julia Duffy as Lynn, a widowed neighbor
- Paula Pell as Dana Richards, a neighbor who is a Marine veteran
- Mark Proksch as Tod Mann, an eccentric neighbor

=== Recurring ===
- Justin Kirk as Gary, the new owner of the Hinkley House
- Danielle Kennedy as Agnes Festersen, the Hinkley Hills Homeowners Association (HOA) president
- Randy Oglesby as Bill Festersen, Agnes' husband
- RJ Cyler as Langston, Samira's brother
- Kyrie McAlpin as Rory, a Girl Scouts member
- Max Carver as Danny Daniels
- Erica Dasher as Betsy
- Georgia Leva as Kate
- Kathleen Kenny as Lauren Festersen-Daniels
- Wendy Schaal as Judy

== Episodes ==
No.	Title	Directed by	Written by	Original release date
1	"The Goddamn Brownies"	Nzingha Stewart	Celeste Hughey	February 8, 2026
2	"Mind Your Own Business"	Jeff Byrd	Zora Bikangaga	February 8, 2026
3	"Sardine?"	Rachel Goldberg	Madie Dhaliwal	February 8, 2026
4	"A Nine on the Tension Scale"	Thembi Banks	Rachel Shukert	February 8, 2026
5	"The Old Face-to-Face"	Natalia Leite	Amy Aniobi	February 8, 2026
6	"Neighbor Take Warning"	Heather Jack	Neil Reynolds	February 8, 2026
7	"Do Not Mess with Suburbanites"	Yana Gorskaya	William Yu & Hakim Hill	February 8, 2026
8	"Only One Way Out"	Jeff Byrd	Amy Aniobi & Neil Reynolds	February 8, 2026

== Production ==
=== Development ===
The series received a straight to order from Peacock in September 2024 with Celeste Hughey adapting the 1989 film The 'Burbs with Jack Whitehall and Keke Palmer leading the cast. Hughey and Palmer serve as executive producers. Seth MacFarlane is also an executive producer, with Brian Grazer of Imagine Entertainment, who produced the original film. Dana Olsen, who wrote the film, serves as a co-executive producer. The series was said to be filming on the Universal Studios Lot, as the film did. Kristen Zolner and Natalie Berkus also executive produce for Imagine Entertainment with Erica Huggins and Aimee Carlson for Fuzzy Door, as well as Rachel Shukert. Nzingha Stewart serves as a director of the first episode and executive producer. In April 2026, Peacock renewed the series for a second season.

=== Casting ===
In February 2025, Kapil Talwalkar, Paula Pell, Julia Duffy, and Mark Proksch joined the starring cast. At the end of that month, Haley Joel Osment, RJ Cyler, and Justin Kirk were cast in recurring capacities. In June 2025, Max Carver, Erica Dasher, Georgia Leva, and Kathleen Kenny joined the cast in recurring roles. Wendy Schaal, who had a role in the 1989 film, appears in the series.

== Release ==
The series premiered on February 8, 2026, on Peacock, with all eight episodes released at once. The series was released on Sky One on April 1, 2026.

== Reception ==
On the review aggregator website Rotten Tomatoes, the series holds an approval rating of 82% based on 33 reviews. The website's critics consensus reads, "A television remake that lightens up the original film's hellish concept, The 'Burbs proves to be a good neighbor thanks primarily to Keke Palmer's crack comedic timing." Metacritic, which uses a weighted average, gave it a score of 63 out of 100 based on 14 critics, indicating "generally favorable" reviews.
