= Mariah Buzolin =

Brazilian actress

- Born: Mariah Buzolin Oliveira; February 3, 1991 (age 35); Campinas, São Paulo, Brazil
- Other name: Mariah Moore
- Occupation: Actress
- Years active: 2007–present

Mariah Buzolin Oliveira (born February 3, 1991) is a Brazilian actress. She is best known for her role as Maya Mercado in All My Children, and as Zoe Mendez in the ABC Family television series Jane by Design.

On or about May 30, 2018, Oliveira became engaged to former U.S. skier Jeremy Bloom. The couple had been dating since January 2017 and living together since May of that year. They were building a home in Boulder, CO, where they planned to reside.

Oliveira was married on Sunday, November 11, 2018, in Keystone, CO.

== Life and career ==
She was born in São Paulo, Brazil on February 3, 1991. She is the youngest child of two. Her parents named her Mariah Buzolin Oliviera but sometimes she credited as Mariah Moore in several films. At the age of six, she moved to Chicago with her family, where in less than three months she was fluent in the language. In 2003, her first professional opportunities began to appear when she won a fashion contest, competing against hundreds of other girls nationwide. She moved to Los Angeles in 2006 after getting the attention from several agents and agencies. She began her acting career in 2007 when she played Sara in Fallout and also playing Mary in The Faithful alongside Aliens in the Attic star, Austin Butler. She also had appearance on the Nickelodeon series Zoey 101 as Brooke Margolin. In 2009, she playing Beth on the American children's comedy film, Hotel For Dogs alongside Emma Roberts and Jake T. Austin. She became known for her role as Angelina on the Disney Channel series, Jonas.

In 2012, she guest starred on the Nickelodeon show Hollywood Heights and played Zoe Mendez on Jane by Design.

== Filmography ==
Film
Year	Title	Role	Notes
2007	Fallout	Sara	Short film
2007	The Faithful	Mary	Short film
2009	Hotel for Dogs	Beth	

Television
Year	Title	Role	Notes
2008	Zoey 101	Brooke Margolin	Episode: "Quinn Misses the Mark"
2009	Jonas	Angelina	Episode: "That Ding You Do"
2010	Lie to Me	Ashley	Episode: "The Royal We"
2010	Glory Daze	Co-Ed	Episode: "Pilot"
2011	All My Children	Maya Mercado	46 episodes
2011	CSI: NY	Annie	Episode: "Get Me Out of Here!"
2011	Christmas Spirit	Allison	TV film
2012	Jane by Design	Zoe Mendez	7 episodes
2012	Hollywood Heights	Nicole	Episode: "Max Confronts Chloe"
2012	Beauty & the Beast	Daphne	Episode: "Worth"
2016	Girl Meets World	Adult Riley Matthews	Episode: "Girl Meets the bay Window"
