= Night Court (2023 TV series) =

2023 American sitcom revival

- Season 1 promotional poster
- Genre: Sitcom
- Created by: Reinhold Weege
- Developed by: Dan Rubin
- Showrunner: Dan Rubin
- Starring: Melissa Rauch; India de Beaufort; Kapil Talwalkar; Lacretta; John Larroquette; Nyambi Nyambi; Wendie Malick
- Music by: Benjamin Sword Larroquette
- Opening theme: originally composed by Jack Elliott
- Country of origin: United States
- Original language: English
- No. of seasons: 3
- No. of episodes: 47

Production
- Executive producers: Pamela Fryman; Winston Rauch; Melissa Rauch; Dan Rubin; Lon Zimmet; Mathew Harawitz; John Larroquette; Leila Strachan; Mona Garcea; Lindsey Shockley
- Producers: John Larroquette; Suzy Mamann Greenberg; Josh Corey & Brian Kratz; Pixie Wespiser; Julie Mandel-Folly; Caroline Fox
- Cinematography: Christian La Fountaine; Wayne Kennan; Erik Carter
- Editors: Kirk Benson; Chris Poulos; Stephen Prime; Jordan Beal
- Camera setup: Multi-camera
- Running time: 21–23 minutes
- Production companies: After January Productions; Secret Bird; Universal Television; Warner Bros. Television Studios

Original release
- Network: NBC
- Release: January 17, 2023 – May 6, 2025

Related
- Night Court (1984–1992)

Night Court is an American sitcom which is a revival of the series of the same name that originally aired from 1984 to 1992. It was produced by After January Productions, Secret Bird, Universal Television and Warner Bros. Television Studios and aired on NBC from January 17, 2023 to May 6, 2025. In February 2023, the series was renewed for a second season which then premiered on December 23, 2023. In May 2024, the series was renewed for a third season which premiered on November 19, 2024. In May 2025, the series was canceled after three seasons.

== Premise ==
Judge Abby Stone (Melissa Rauch) comes to New York City to take a job as magistrate for Manhattan Criminal Court's night shift – a position once held by her late father Harry Stone. Also part of the night shift are cheerful and eccentric bailiff Donna "Gurgs" Gurganous (Lacretta), and public defender Dan Fielding (John Larroquette) – who had served as a prosecutor in Harry's court, and was convinced by Abby to join her court when the assigned public defender quit on Abby's first day. Dan briefly left to become a judge in his home state of Louisiana, though he would later come back as public defender. Court prosecutors include ambitious Olivia Moore (India de Beaufort) and later vengeful ex-con Julianne Walters (Wendie Malick). Court clerks include shy Neil (Kapil Talwalkar), and later harried single father Wyatt (Nyambi Nyambi).

== Cast and characters ==
=== Main ===
- Melissa Rauch as Abby Stone, the daughter of the late Harry Stone, who fills her father's former position as judge on the night shift at the Manhattan Criminal Court. In "Blood Moon Binga", she learns her full name is Abracadabra Stone, though she believed it was Abigail, the name she uses. In "Pension Tension", it is revealed that Abby's middle initial is "T" like her father Harry's was, though she adds that it stands for "Torme", after singer Mel Torme, who Harry (as well as Harry Anderson himself) was a big fan of.
- India de Beaufort as Olivia (seasons 1–2), the assistant district attorney assigned to Abby's court
- Kapil Talwalkar as Neil Valluri (season 1), Abby's clerk
- Lacretta as Donna "Gurgs" Gurganous, the bailiff for Abby's court
- John Larroquette as Dan Fielding, the former assistant district attorney for Harry's court and his best friend, who comes back to serve as the public defender in Abby's court. Formerly a sex-obsessed "ladies' man", Dan settled down in the mid 1990s marrying a woman named Sarah, who died shortly before the revival series began. Despite giving up his skirt chasing ways, he retains his sarcastic wit. Dan briefly leaves Abby's court to become a judge in his home state of Louisiana, though he returns both to New York and his public defender job at the start of the second season.
- Nyambi Nyambi as Wyatt Shaw (seasons 2–3), (Note: Nyambi is credited as a series regular starting from 2x05.) court clerk with great fashion sense who is also a single father
- Wendie Malick as Julianne (season 3; recurring seasons 1–2), the new district attorney who is also a former career criminal intent on ruining Dan's life as revenge for prosecuting her years ago

=== Recurring ===
- Gary Anthony Williams as Murray Flobert, an eccentric judge who substituted for Abby
- Pete Holmes as Rand, Abby's fiancé
- Ryan Hansen as Jake, Abby's boyfriend
- Marsha Warfield as Rosalind "Roz" Russell, a former bailiff of Judge Harry Stone's court, now working as a private investigator, and who briefly takes back her bailiff position to obtain her pension. Warfield reprises her role from the original series.
- Brent Spiner and Annie O'Donnell as Bob and June Wheeler, a frequently down-on-their-luck hillbilly couple. Spiner and O'Donnell reprise their roles from the original series.
- Dimiter Marinov as Nikolai, the court's maintenance man
- Betsy Sodaro as Bert, the courthouse's head janitor
- Al Bayan as Blaine
- Biff Wiff as Kenny
- Pam Murphy as Pam Allen
- Janie Haddad Tompkins as Esther
- Kurt Fuller as Jeff Dewitt, a New York district attorney
- Carol Mansell as Louise
- Lisa Costanza as Carol
- Indira G. Wilson as Loretta
- Kenneth Mosley as Devin
- Jaime Moyer as Linda
- Jessica St. Clair as Heather, Abby's friend
- Richard Kind as Sy Hoffman, a disgraced Broadway producer
- Kate Micucci as Carol Ann Wheeler, Bob and June's daughter
- Julia Duffy as Susan, Jake's mother
- Ray Abruzzo as Carl Santini, a reformed mobster dating Julianne. Abruzzo previously played Detective Tony Giuliano in the original series, in which he was married to public defender Christine Sullivan and was the father of their son, Charlie.

=== Guest stars ===
- Iris Bahr as Jane
- Kimia Behpoornia as Maggie
- Marypat Farrell as Helen
- Brian Scolaro as Arnold
- Antonio Raul Corbo as Carlos
- Tara Lipinski as Herself
- Johnny Weir as Himself
- Faith Ford as Gina (Brown) Stone, Abby's mother and Harry's widow
- Stephnie Weir as Remecca Monte-Pulciano, an investigative podcaster
- Frances Callier as Ernie
- Melissa Villaseñor as Gabby, Neil's girlfriend
- Kareem Abdul-Jabbar as Himself
- Maria Bamford as The Ghost of Christmas Present
- Jackie Geary as Tess
- Biff Yeager as Remy
- Jackie Hoffman as Linda
- John Gemberling as Bryant
- Jeff Meacham as Mr. Umansky
- Rob Huebel as Pellino
- Paul Scheer as Carnes
- Kunal Nayyar as Martini Toddwallis, a famous fashion designer
- Jenifer Lewis as Erika Ellis
- Sarah Baker as Tiff
- Ashley Padilla as Mitzi
- Melissa Fumero as Jasmine Jennings
- Julia Sweeney as Jovan, a fortune teller
- Rhys Darby as Alistair Tully, Gurg's boyfriend
- Dave Foley as Duncan
- Gigi Rice as Katie Sullivan, Christine Sullivan's sister
- Andy Daly as Fred Norton, a salesman
- Joe Lo Truglio as Detective Kratz, a New York Police Department detective
- Mayim Bialik as Herself
- Kate Flannery as Marge
- Gilles Marini as Rodrigo, Julianne's soulmate
- Lauren Lapkus as Belinda
- Andrew Rannells as Tad
- Nico Santos as Dr. Nitelife
- Eden Sher as Madison
- Andrew Patrick Ralston as Daddy
- Mo Collins as Starla
- Wesley Mann as Mr. Danielson, Mann reprises his role from the original series
- Laura Spencer as Lucy
- George Basil as Goose
- Jason Sklar as Ryan
- Randy Sklar as Bryan
- Michael Urie as Judge Toby Nulman, the courthouse's new "fun judge"
- Raegan Revord as Sylvia Plath, a teenage runaway inclined to marry her soulmate
- Simon Helberg as Spencer, Abby's husband

== Episodes ==
=== Series overview ===
Season	Episodes	Originally released		Rank	Average viewership (in millions)	Ref
Season	Episodes	First released	Last released	Rank	Average viewership (in millions)	Ref
1	16	January 17, 2023	May 9, 2023	38	5.46	
2	13	December 23, 2023	March 26, 2024	58	3.85	
3	18	November 19, 2024	May 6, 2025	TBA	TBA	TBA

=== Season 1 (2023) ===
No. overall	No. in season	Title	Directed by	Written by	Original release date	Prod. code	U.S. viewers (millions)
1	1	"Pilot"	Pamela Fryman	Dan Rubin	January 17, 2023	T11.10152	7.55
Abby Stone, daughter of late Judge Harry Stone, takes over the night court. Like her father, she is interested in the defendants as people and wants to take time to administer justice, much to the annoyance of the overworked courthouse staff. When the public defender quits, Abby recruits Dan Fielding, the former assistant district attorney and her father's friend, to fill the role. Dan, who has been working as a process server after losing his wife, is reluctant, but agrees to fill in for a few weeks. Meanwhile, Gurgs tries to track down a courthouse vandal.
2	2	"The Nighthawks"	Pamela Fryman	Dan Rubin	January 17, 2023	T12.17502	6.94
Dan, who is used to being a prosecutor, has difficulty caring about his clients. When Abby insists he try harder, Dan bribes Gurgs to interview his clients for him. Only after connecting with a mentally ill defendant does Dan begin to take his work seriously, leading Abby to predict he will stay on for a long time. Meanwhile, Abby encourages the staff to bring their own touches to the courtroom with somewhat disastrous results, Olivia is stalked by a stenographer determined to be her best friend, and the custodian deals with a pigeon infestation.
3	3	"Just Tuesday"	Anthony Rich	Mathew Harawitz	January 24, 2023	T12.17505	5.17
In her efforts to remedy a defendant's newly chronic criminality, Abby accidentally outs him as an undercover cop. Fearing her personal approach is doing more harm than good, she becomes unrelentingly businesslike in the courtroom. When Dan tries to remedy this overcorrection, Abby holds him in contempt. Dan realizes that Abby's sensitivity to being of service stems from the fact that, like Dan's late wife, Abby is a recovering alcoholic. She confides that her drinking cost her a lot of time with her father, though he lived long enough to see her thrive in recovery. Dan tells her that Harry would never have felt let down by her. She returns to her previous demeanor. Meanwhile, Olivia struggles to adapt when the police officers withdraw the perks she had been enjoying. Believing this is an unreasonable response to the courtroom incident, she confronts the officers, only to inadvertently reveal the ethically questionable perks to an Internal Affairs representative, whose presence was the actual reason for the change.
4	4	"Dan v. Dating"	Anthony Rich	Lon Zimmet	January 31, 2023	T12.17504	4.77
When Abby learns that Dan is being hit on by multiple women, including his client, she suggests to Dan that he start dating again. He then hits it off with a woman named Julianne (Wendie Malick) who gives him her number. Dan arranges a date. Abby and Neil then go to spy on them, finding Dan alone at the restaurant. Upon learning that Dan did not even text the woman, Neil sends the message he wrote but did not send. Upon learning that Julianne is only interested in sex, Dan takes her home, but is only able to talk about his late wife. Julianne admits that she is a career criminal who wanted to ruin Dan's life for prosecuting her years before, but finds him too pathetic for revenge. Meanwhile, Gurgs and Olivia move into an abandoned office, but Olivia has trouble dealing with Gurgs's outgoing personality.
5	5	"The Apartment"	Mark Cendrowski	Leila Strachan	February 7, 2023	T12.17503	4.22
Frustrated by her less-than-ideal living situation, Abby enlists Gurgs to help her use the court system to find a vacant apartment. They locate an ideal place, but the landlord refuses to rent to Abby when he realizes that she is a judge. Abby, increasingly frustrated by her life and not being able to spend time with her long-distance fiancé, takes Dan's advice to stop bottling up her anger and destroys her office. Meanwhile, Olivia runs into a lawyer who almost hired her for a prestigious job until she made a fool out of herself after the interview. Dan, who has memories of an embarrassing interview of his own, encourages Olivia to prove herself in court, which proves a moot point when the lawyer sends someone else to court in her stead.
6	6	"Justice Buddies"	Anthony Rich	Azie Dungey	February 14, 2023	T12.17506	3.78
Gurgs' 12-year-old nephew Xavier and some classmates visit the court. Gurgs is hoping to bond with her nephew, but realizes the children only want to protest the arrest of a social justice activist who was arrested for vandalizing a statue of Christopher Columbus. Abby asks Gurgs to convince the children to stop their protest chants; instead, Gurgs joins them. In the end, Abby conspires with Dan to allow the children to legally protest, and Xavier decides that the justice system is not totally flawed, especially with Gurgs as a part of it. Meanwhile, Olivia spars with a middle school girl who is after her job, Neil takes romantic advice from one of the students, and Dan enjoys having one of the kids as a flunky.
7	7	"Train Court"	Leonard R. Garner Jr.	Lon Zimmet & Julianne Turkel	February 21, 2023	T12.17515	3.69
When Abby discovers she and Olivia take the same subway, she's determined to buddy up, so Olivia can teach her to be a 'true New Yorker'. When the train is delayed, Olivia begins to panic. In order to distract her, Abby holds an impromptu trial on the train over a stolen seat. Meanwhile, a substitute judge takes over the court. When Gurgs realizes Abby's heroes Tara Lipinski and Johnny Weir are witnesses in a case, she's determined to delay the case until Abby can arrive, while Dan tries to expedite court to make a dinner reservation. Dan ultimately sides with Gurgs and draws out the hearing until Abby can arrive, only to realize she already knows the pair. As a peace offering, Gurgs fixes Dan a meal of the Louisiana Bayou food of his youth.
8	8	"Blood Moon Binga"	Pamela Fryman	Rebecca Delgado Smith & Jessica Elaina Eason	February 28, 2023	T12.17507	3.56
On a blood moon night filled with unusual cases, Abby's mother Gina shows up for a surprise visit. After introducing herself to Abby's staff, it is revealed that she and Dan know each other. Olivia and Neil stumble onto the truth, which was that Gina was arrested years before for running an illegal gambling ring and was brought in front of Harry's court with Dan prosecuting. After serving her sentence, Harry and Gina reconnected, fell in love, married, and moved to upstate New York, where Abby (revealed to be short for Abracadabra per Harry's wishes) was born. Abby was unaware of any of this but forgives her mother for the deception.
9	9	"Two Peas on a Pod"	Kelly Park	Mathew Harawitz & Lon Zimmet	March 7, 2023	T12.17510	3.93
Remecca, a podcaster Abby admires, appears in the court as a witness and Abby convinces her to do an episode about the court. When Dan admits to malfeasance during his 1980s run for city council, his career is put in jeopardy. Abby's attempts to smooth things over backfire when she admits that Dan was a friend of her father's, and Remecca threatens to call Abby out for cronyism. Dan agrees to a tell-all interview if Remecca leaves Abby alone. Meanwhile, Olivia convinces Neil to pose as her boyfriend in hopes that Remecca would cover the story of their illicit workplace romance. Remecca's podcast is ultimately cancelled when her sound man exposes her past as an obnoxious shock jock.
10	10	"Marathon-Thon-Thon-Thon-Thon"	Joanna Kerns	Teleplay by : Jessica Elaina Eason & Rebecca Delgado Smith; Story by : Shawn Parikh	March 14, 2023	T12.17514	3.55
Abby's fiance, Rand, shows up to help her train for a marathon. When Abby tries to get Olivia to join her, Rand takes it upon himself to cultivate a friendship between them. Abby and Olivia both overdo their training, causing them to drop out of the race before the first mile. Meanwhile, Dan is furious when the courthouse plans to remove his favorite bench. He eventually admits to Gurgs that it's because he carved his initials in it the day he won his first court case, and it's been an island of stability in his life.
11	11	"Ready or Knot"	Robbie Countryman	Shawn Parikh	March 28, 2023	T12.17509	3.39
A riot at a bridal expo brings a number of wedding businesspeople to the courthouse, causing Abby to start thinking about her own wedding, which was delayed by her father's death. Olivia and Gurgs vie to be Abby's maid of honor, while a wedding planner becomes obsessed with planning Dan's theoretical wedding. Abby trades a reservation at her dream venue in exchange for performing a wedding that night in the courtroom but breaks down upon realizing her father will not be at her own wedding. Dan suggests they hold the wedding on the courthouse roof, where he and Abby's father had a lot of good times.
12	12	"DA Club"	Lynda Tarryk	Bennett Webber	April 4, 2023	T12.17508	3.29
Abby meets district attorney Jeff Dewitt at his exclusive lawyers club to discuss how his tough-on-crime stance is hurting society. Dan - his old associate and fellow club member - shows up to watch out for Abby and realizes Dewitt is planning on using Abby as a soft-on-crime scapegoat for his next election. Abby threatens to expose Dewitt's extramarital affair unless he takes her crime proposals seriously. Meanwhile Olivia (aided by Gurgs and Neil) attempts to gain membership in the club.
13	13	"Past Apps"	Betsy Thomas	Josh Corey & Brian Kratz	April 11, 2023	T12.17511	2.77
An app developer named Brock appears as a witness in court and pitches his new dating app. Dan tries to get the gang to invest, but Abby accidentally reads Brock's sealed file and discovers that he was once convicted of fraud. Dan worms the information out of Abby but still wants to invest (as years before he missed out on a chance to be a ground floor investor in what would become Facebook) and actually brings one of Brock's old victims on board. Abby gets Brock's records unsealed and reveals his criminal record at the investors' party, but Brock announces that he has already cut his past victims in on the profits of his new venture. Brock kicks the courtroom crew out, including Olivia, who was attempting to seduce Brock, and Gurgs, who was pitching her own app. Mark Zuckerberg then buys the app for $2 billion, costing everyone a fortune. Gurgs lets it slip to Abby about Neil's secret crush on her.
14	14	"When Abby Met Gabby"	Joanna Kerns	Azie Dungey & Stacy Adelman	April 25, 2023	T12.17512	2.86
Now aware of Neil's crush on her, Abby (with Olivia's help) tries to find a way to tell him that she is not interested without hurting his feelings. They run into Gabby - Neil's high school crush who has similar interests and personality traits as Abby and is coming off a divorce - and attempt to set Neil and Gabby up on a date. The date is successful, but it leaves Abby questioning whether she and Rand will wind up the same way as Gabby and her ex-husband. Meanwhile, Gurgs blames herself after someone in the courtroom throws a drink at Dan and becomes overly protective of him.
15	15	"The Honorable Dan Fielding, Part 1"	Pamela Fryman	Leila Strachan & Marc Carusiello	May 2, 2023	T12.17513	3.02
Dan accepts an offer to be a judge in his native Louisiana. He (reluctantly) attends his going away party arranged by Abby and Rand, who are having their own issues - namely Abby getting distracted by work matters, thus neglecting Rand. Among the work matters is an elderly lady who appeared in court on charges she set fire to a nursing home when she lit the candles on her boyfriend's birthday cake. After letting her off with a small fine to pay the damages, Abby is then asked by the lady to help spring her boyfriend from the nursing home. The errant escape attempt results in Abby getting arrested and calling Dan to bail her out. Meanwhile, Olivia attempts to assist Gurgs to pass the bailiff's supervisor test, and winds up getting her a job at Scotland Yard.
16	16	"The Honorable Dan Fielding, Part 2"	Joanna Kerns	Caroline Fox & Bennett Webber	May 9, 2023	T12.17516	2.42
Dan bails Abby out of jail, and prepares to defend her in court, with the case prosecuted by Abby's nemesis Jeff Dewitt, who pressures Olivia to assist him or else lose her job. Abby, however, resists resorting to Dan's hardball defense tactics, including implicating Louise - the lady from the nursing home who got Abby into the mess to start with - even after Louise wears a wire (at Dewitt's insistence) to implicate Abby. Abby eventually talks to Rand, and they agree to break off their engagement, as Abby loves her job in NYC, and Rand wants to remain upstate. During Abby's trial, Rand convinces numerous people - including Abby's co-workers and people who appeared before Abby in court - to be character witnesses on her behalf, including Olivia, who puts her friendship with Abby above her own job. Louise testifies that Dewitt had threatened to blackmail her unless she wore the wire to try to implicate Abby. The judge dismisses the charges against Abby. Dan returns to Louisiana to become a judge, where one of the first cases in front of him involves former co-worker Roz Russell, who served as a bailiff in Harry's court.

=== Season 2 (2023–24) ===
No. overall	No. in season	Title	Directed by	Written by	Original release date	Prod. code	U.S. viewers (millions)
17	1	"A Night Court Before Christmas"	Anthony Rich	Bennett Webber	December 23, 2023	T12.17908	2.58
Dan and Abby pretend to be Santa and an elf for a girl named Virginia who still believes. Olivia is tormented by a witness who believes she is the Ghost of Christmas Present. Gurgs arranges a video greeting to Dan from his hero, Kareem Abdul-Jabbar, and is shocked when he shows up in person.
18	2	"The Roz Affair"	Pamela Fryman	Dan Rubin	January 2, 2024	T12.17901	3.77
Dan catches up with Roz - who became a private investigator after leaving Harry's court years before - during her imprisonment in New Orleans (for getting into a fight at her bachelorette party). Roz then asks Dan to come back to New York to assist her in an investigation to see if her fiance was cheating on her. Dan bungles the investigation, leading to him and Roz pleading their case in front of Abby. After paying a fine for damages and having heart-to-heart talks with Roz and Abby, Dan moves back to NYC to resume his role as the defense attorney in Abby's court. Meanwhile, Neil left NYC to move with his girlfriend to Lake Tahoe, leaving Flobert to serve as court clerk, Gurgs regales the court with stories of her London adventures and Olivia tries to establish a side gig as a sports agent.
19	3	"Form Fetish"	Anthony Rich	Mathew Harawitz	January 9, 2024	T12.17902	3.38
A city hall bureaucrat named Linda takes delight in denying the court needed amenities following budget cuts. Dan tries sucking up to her by hiring her slacker/gamer son as the new court clerk. Meanwhile, Olivia and Gurgs find a cache of a discontinued, high-caffeine soda in a storeroom, and then sell it at a markup. After Linda's son fails as clerk, Abby and Dan (after chugging several cans of Olivia and Gurgs' soda) then fill out the hundreds of forms Linda forced upon them, giving her no choice but to approve their requests.
20	4	"Just the Fax, Dan"	Pamela Fryman	Lon Zimmet	January 16, 2024	T12.17903	3.43
A hacker seizes control of the court's computers and the staff's personal devices, threatening via fax (as there was an old fax machine left over in Abby's chamber from her father's time as judge), to expose their secrets unless a certain defendant is found guilty. Dan tries to negotiate with the hacker, Abby tries to delay court, and Gurgs suspects Wyatt, the new court clerk (who turns out just to be a harried single father). The hacker is revealed to be the defendant's teenage son, who wants revenge for his father's philandering.
21	5	"Hold the Pickles, Keep the Change"	Pamela Fryman	Chuck Tatham	January 23, 2024	T12.17904	2.95
Upon learning her ex-fiance has a girlfriend, Abby ignores Wyatt's advice to start dating again and instead throws her efforts into creating the perfect pickle. Olivia attempts to date an ambulance-chasing attorney, but is thwarted by his legal partner, who wants him to focus on business. Gurgs is concerned about Dan and Flobert's less than healthy eating habits.
22	6	"Wrath of Comic-Con"	Anthony Rich	Leila Strachan	January 30, 2024	T12.17905	3.02
As various cosplaying defendants appear in court stemming from incidents at the NYC Comic-Con, Abby's childhood friend Heather comes to visit, and is forced to confront the fact that she might actually dislike Heather due to her annoying habits. Julianne returns to torment Dan, and he takes advantage of having the numerous costumed Comic-Con attendees around the courtroom to disguise himself as a Klingon from Star Trek to hide from her. But when Julianne (herself dressed as Catwoman) runs into the disguised Dan, they have a conversation where they actually hit it off until she realizes it's Dan and gets taken away by the police due to starting a fire earlier in the day. Wyatt wants to go to Comic-Con as Morpheus from The Matrix to try to meet women but instead goes as a character from Paw Patrol as he is forced to take his kids when he could not find a babysitter, and Gurgs instead goes as Morpheus.
23	7	"A Crime of Fashion"	Lynda Tarryk	Lindsey Shockley	February 6, 2024	T12.17906	3.31
Various fashionistas are appearing in court stemming from incidents during New York Fashion Week. Among them is designer Martini Toddwalls, who is hiding in Abby's chambers to avoid the paparazzi. Abby finds him, they hit it off, go on a date, and spend the night together. But after the garish feathered robe Toddwalls designs for her causes Abby to be attacked by a peacock in the courtroom, Abby breaks it off with him. Meanwhile, the fashion critic Dan is representing in court shows him ways to get people to leave him alone, and after Dan accidentally mixed up Olivia's dry cleaning with clothes meant to go to charity (forcing Olivia to wear a 1980s era outfit with shoulder pads to work), they scheme to get her clothes back from the nonprofit discount store they were sent to.
24	8	"Broadway Danny Gurgs"	Ren Bell	Julie Mandel-Folly	February 13, 2024	T12.17907	2.91
Years after Dan invested $5,000 in a Broadway play that flopped, he is forced to defend the producer of the play in court in order to get Gurgs (who is an admirer of the producer) an audition. Olivia had been bribing a doorman to have her deliveries sent to the Central Park West apartment building where he works to make it appear that she lives in the upscale neighborhood. But when the doorman dies, Olivia feels real sadness at the loss of a friend.
25	9	"Taught and Bothered"	Ren Bell	Shawn Parikh	February 20, 2024	T12.17910	2.51
Abby becomes attracted to a courtroom observer, who turns out to be Jake, a city human resources official. To try to get closer to him, Abby drags the rest of the court staff to Jake's Saturday HR seminar. During the seminar, Jake talks about how relationships in the workplace should not be too personal, which clashes with Abby's overly personal philosophy, and this difference in opinion causes riffs among the other staff (Olivia and Gurgs regarding shared living quarters, and Dan and Wyatt over saying "thank you"). After an argument, Abby and Jake wind up kissing in her chambers. Meanwhile, Flobert is trying to sell time shares in Cleveland to the court staff.
26	10	"Chips Ahoy"	Phill Lewis	Jessica Elaina Eason & Rebecca Delgado Smith	March 5, 2024	T12.17909	2.88
As numerous sailors appear in court due to incidents occurring during NYC Fleet Week, Dan arranges a clandestine poker game in the courthouse basement, and scores big until Gurgs and Olivia (a card sharp in her own right) help the sailors win back their money. Separately, Jasmine - a pushy local PTA president who Wyatt is intimidated by through their dealings regarding Wyatt's kids - also appears in court and when found guilty by Abby starts bullying Wyatt. When Abby tells Wyatt to stand up to Jasmine, Jasmine instead gets turned on, as nobody had ever stood up to her like that before. Eventually, when Jasmine comes on too strong to Wyatt, Abby challenges her to a pop-a-shot contest on a basketball arcade game, which is won by Abby, and thus making Jasmine back off of Wyatt.
27	11	"Wheelers of Fortune"	Phill Lewis	Kim Tran	March 12, 2024	T12.17911	3.05
Bob and June Wheeler - frequent defendants in Harry's court - appear before Abby for the first time (much to Dan's chagrin), and as in the past, bad luck and calamity follow them (including a section of the courtroom's plaster ceiling falling on Abby's head). Abby - who was fascinated by the stories her father told her about the Wheelers - asks them to put her in touch with a prominent psychic they have connections with to try to contact her dad in the afterlife (even going so far as babysitting the Wheeler's adult daughter in return). Abby eventually meets with the psychic, who turns out to be a fraud. When Dan tries to console Abby over being let down by the psychic, he unknowingly utters a phrase that Abby and Harry used to share between them, leading to him and Abby bonding over Harry's memory (with Dan even becoming a bit emotional remembering his old friend). Meanwhile Olivia buys a house thought to be haunted, and Gurgs asks Wyatt to help remove a perceived curse.
28	12	"The Duke's a Hazard"	Kelly Park	Teleplay by : Lauren Halberg & Alex Sobotowski; Story by : Julianne Turkel	March 19, 2024	T12.17912	2.81
Alistair Tully, the British Duke who Gurgs has had a long-distance relationship with since her visit to Scotland Yard, arrives in NYC to surprise Gurgs. Gurgs hides in the janitor's closet (which she turned into a mini girl cave), as while she loves Tully, she does not like all of the royal trappings that come with him. Realizing this, Tully asks Abby to show him how "normal people" live to put Gurgs at ease. After the Duke visits the subway and gets tickets to a New York Rangers hockey game, Gurgs appreciates what he is willing to go through to be with her and accepts the date. Meanwhile Dan and the Duke's butler Duncan renew a feud their families had centuries before in England, and Olivia attempts to hook up with a palace guard who accompanied the Duke on his trip.
29	13	"The Best Dan"	Lynda Tarryk	Caroline Fox	March 26, 2024	T12.17913	2.81
Roz returns to court to deal with a last-minute legal issue regarding her wedding venue. After losing both the case and the venue, she is persuaded by Abby to hold her wedding at the courthouse, to which Roz reluctantly agrees. Meanwhile, Dan runs into Katie, the sister of his late co-worker/friend Christine Sullivan. They hit it off at first, because Katie does not realize who he is. After finding out, she lashes out at him due to his past history with Christine and not attending her funeral. Dan confides in Abby that he wanted a relationship with Christine but once she warmed up to the idea, he began to believe that he was not good enough for her and ran away. His relationship with Christine is what made him ready to eventually settle down with his wife Sarah. He actually was at Christine's funeral but stayed inconspicuous so as not to make a scene given their history. Katie overhears this and makes peace with Dan. Meanwhile, Devin, a lawyer who was passed over for a partnership in the law firm run by Roz's fiance, keeps sabotaging the wedding. Gurgs, Olivia, Wyatt, and Flobert eventually stop him.

=== Season 3 (2024–25) ===
No. overall	No. in season	Title	Directed by	Written by	Original release date	Prod. code	U.S. viewers (millions)
30	1	"The Judge's Boyfriend's Dad, Part 1"	Phill Lewis	Dan Rubin	November 19, 2024	T12.19301	2.52
Abby continues to agonize over the possibility that Jake may be Dan's son. To know for sure, she talks to Jake's mother Susan, However, when Abby finds Susan in a heavily medicated state in the hospital (after Susan had breast enlargement surgery), Susan mentions she also had a relationship with a judge who happened to be a magician (implying Harry, which would mean Abby and Jake would be half-siblings). To clear things up once and for all, she collects DNA from herself, Jake, and Dan (including having Flobert hide in a garbage can to collect Dan's DNA from a coffee cup). The DNA tests reveal that Harry is not the father, but Dan may still be in play. Meanwhile, Dan's nemesis Julianne returns, as she has been named the court's new prosecutor (after Olivia left to take a job with a law firm), and though he thinks she is still seeking to torment him, the rest of the court staff seem convinced she has turned over a new leaf.
31	2	"The Judge's Boyfriend's Dad, Part 2"	Phill Lewis	Lindsey Shockley	November 26, 2024	T12.19302	2.39
While Harry was shown not to be Jake's father by the DNA test, the results on Dan were inconclusive, so while another DNA test was being evaluated, Abby tries to get Dan and Jake to bond. After some reluctance, the two men do start bonding over things like fixing Dan's squeaky chair and going tie shopping. They bond so well, that Abby starts feeling left out. Eventually, the DNA test showed that Dan was not Jake's father, and while attending a New York Yankees baseball game with Abby (using a ticket originally meant for Jake), Dan confesses he liked the idea of being someone's father and felt a bit of a father-daughter relationship with Abby. Meanwhile, Gurgs catches Julianne smoking on the courthouse balcony, and after some taunting back and forth, Gurgs tries to get former smoker Wyatt to get Julianne to stop and instead reignites his old habit. Julianne then confesses that she was not actually smoking on the balcony outside Abby's office but was trying to eavesdrop on conversations amongst the staff to try to get an edge in court, but all they ever talked about was their personal lives.
32	3	"The Hole Truth"	Anthony Rich	Lon Zimmet	December 3, 2024	T12.19304	2.27
NYC is in the midst of a city-wide sanitation worker strike, affecting the court staff in various ways. Courthouse janitor Bert is keeping the courtroom free of garbage, but when Abby makes a flippant remark after learning that Bert throws the trash into a hole in the courthouse basement, Bert takes offense and joins the sanitation worker strike. As trash is piling up in the courthouse (and driving germaphobe/neat freak Wyatt crazy) Abby finds out - through dumpster diving - that Bert's beloved pet alligator died. Abby then arranges a funeral in the basement for the gator, which Bert is thankful for and resumes her work as the sanitation strike had ended. But when the casket encased gator is thrown into the hole where the trash is thrown in, it severed a power line, plunging the city into a blackout. Meanwhile, Dan and Julianne start to bond as they were able to walk the city in peace due to the strike and the smell of the piled-up garbage keeping people away, using expired ear drops found in the trash with the side effect of losing the sense of smell to block out the stench.
33	4	"Feliz NaviDead"	Phill Lewis	Mathew Harawitz	December 17, 2024	T12.19303	2.07
On Christmas, a case grabs Abby's interest, when a vacuum salesman will not leave a customer alone. After the lights go out and come back on, the defendant disappears. The salesman was actually an actor who performs at murder mystery parties and got too deep into his role. Once the actor is found, Abby tries to convince him to go to jail with a detective by having the rest of the court staff play characters in the story he is stuck in. The lights eventually go out again, and upon coming back on, the actor appears to have been killed. Mortified, Dan reveals that he set the whole thing up as a Christmas present for Abby (a murder mystery enthusiast), but did not expect it to get out of hand. Abby then reveals that she knew Dan's secret and hired another actor to play the detective. The murder was actually fake. Unbeknownst to everyone else, the actors playing the defendant and the detective are angels sent from Heaven to spread Christmas cheer. Meanwhile, Gurgs takes offense when Wyatt places her coat over top of his brand-new coat on a coat rack to protect it from getting dirty/stolen.
34	5	"Mayim Worst Enemy"	Jody Margolin Hahn	Laura Gutin Peterson	January 14, 2025	T12.19312	2.16
Actress Mayim Bialik appears in court due to a dispute at a restaurant, and Abby is thrilled to see her, having been a fan of hers since Blossom. Abby is at first excited to become friends with Bialik, but then Bialik starts to become clingier and more obsessed with Abby, which Julianne notices as classic signs of stalker behavior, which terrifies Abby. Abby and the rest of the courthouse crew then go to Bialik's apartment to confront her, but Bialik has remodeled the apartment into an exact replica of Abby's office and holds everyone hostage. Bialik then reveals she was doing character research for an upcoming Broadway play where she is playing a stalker, and releases everybody after apologizing to them. Meanwhile, Dan becomes obsessed with finding the identity of a man who did not hold the elevator door open for him, using a discarded pocket square to try to figure out who it was, which also winds up being staged by Bialik as part of her character research.
35	6	"The Jakeout"	Anthony Rich	Caroline Fox	January 21, 2025	T12.19306	1.96
At the six-month mark of their relationship, Abby wonders why Jake (who stated this was the longest relationship he had ever been in) will not allow her to attend his weekly pick-up basketball games at the gym. When Abby, Gurgs, and Wyatt stakeout the gym - following a smoke bomb distraction by Gurgs - they grab Jake's gym bag, and once back at the courthouse, they find an Abby-sized doll dressed in a cheerleader outfit. After assuming it was a sex doll, Abby learns from Jake (who assumed the doll was stolen and not already in Abby's possession), that he is a male cheerleader, and used the doll for practice for an upcoming competition in Florida, and he never told Abby because the fact he was a male cheerleader was a deal breaker in his past relationships. Abby then tells Jake she supports his cheerleading, and even helps him practice for his routine, but after running into Gurgs and Wyatt in the elevator with the doll and learning the truth, Jake breaks up with Abby. Meanwhile, Dan and Julianne play cat-and-mouse trying to deny any attraction to each other, including hiring people to pose as their dates.
36	7	"Rebound and Down"	Linda Mendoza	Jessica Elaina Eason & Rebecca Delgado Smith	January 28, 2025	T12.19307	1.72
Abby buries herself in her work to try to get over breaking up with Jake, including taking on increased caseloads and shifts. After taking a pass on a date with an escort Wyatt tried to set her up with, Abby instead agrees to go to a meeting of Julianne's support group, which is revealed to be a front for a pyramid scheme where Julianne has everyone selling scented candles. Despite not liking being part of Julianne's scam, Abby does like being around the other women, so she reluctantly goes along with it. Abby eventually tires of Julianne's scheme and convinces the other women to break away from Julianne and form an actual support group. Abby though quickly tires of hearing the other ladies' sob stories and gives them back to Julianne where she hatches a new scheme to sell scrunchies. Meanwhile, Dan and Flobert help Gurgs prep for her interview to become chief bailiff, which she aces (despite their help) and gets the job.
37	8	"Age Against the Machine"	Nikki Lorre	Bennett Webber	February 4, 2025	T12.19308	1.78
Dan defends a young TikTok influencer in court, and she gives him a bad review on a new satisfaction kiosk that had been installed in the courtroom. A young city official named Tad takes note of this and wants to observe if elder statesman Dan can still handle his job. Despite attempts to try to show he can hang with the young crowd (including going to a rock concert with Julianne), Dan shows his age when he returns to work after the concert as he has trouble hearing due to the loud music and is limping from getting jostled in the mosh pit. Dan and Julianne notice Tad watching viral videos with senior citizens looking foolish, and threaten to accuse Tad of ageism unless he leaves Dan alone, which he agrees to. Meanwhile, Wyatt's daughter spreads a rumor that someone in the courtroom has a crush on her father, with Abby and Gurgs accusing each other. Wyatt (after being hooked up to a lie detector) then says that he made the story up to look like big shot in front of his ex-wife.
38	9	"AB-ventures in Babysitting"	Anthony Rich	Lon Zimmet	February 11, 2025	T12.19305	2.07
Abby's annoying friend Heather returns, having recently become a mother. Abby winds up getting suckered into babysitting the while his mom goes out for a night on the town. Abby has trouble trying to get the baby to stop crying, but Dan shows a surprising touch at getting him to calm down. When Heather returns (after her big "night out" was actually just eating hot dogs in the park) she and Abby talk about the baby, and realize that for all Heather's quirks, she is actually a decent mother, and Abby even eventually finds a way to bond with the baby by blowing raspberries. Meanwhile, Gurgs tries not to have the courtroom be in its usual crazy state when a TikTok influencer comes in, but when a case involving a circus breaks down into chaos, the influencer eats it up and Gurgs shrugs it off, embracing the insanity.
39	10	"Pension Tension"	Gail Lerner	Shawn Parikh	February 18, 2025	T12.19309	1.88
Roz returns, lamenting the fact she is three service days short of being able to collect a pension from the city. Abby then temporarily hires her as a second bailiff to reach her pension eligibility, but Roz's old school, roughhouse, and salty style rubs the court staff the wrong way, leading to Abby trying to fire her, but instead (due to being intimidated by Roz), hires her full time. In the cafeteria - where what was supposed to be Roz's retirement party was hastily turned into a welcome back celebration - a dustup between Roz and Julianne forces Abby's hand and winds up firing Roz after all. Roz then admits that was her plan all along...work long enough to collect her pension, and then get a severance check on top of it. Meanwhile, Dan and Gurgs hire an assistant who winds up dumping her work on them in return for promises of favors by her influential father. They then assume they were getting played by the young lady and dump her, but it winds up she was telling the truth, leaving Dan and Gurgs empty-handed.
40	11	"Abracadabra Alaka-Dan"	Roger Christiansen	Julianne Turkel	February 25, 2025	T12.19310	1.81
Harry's former magician's assistant Starla visits the courtroom, gifting Abby a box used in her father's act. Both Abby and Dan get their arm stuck in the box, with Starla saying she'd release them if they give her Harry's book of secrets (kept by Abby in her office behind a phony collection of law books) so she could start her own magic act. Abby then feigns giving Starla the book and handcuffs her to the desk, leading to a stalemate. While everyone is trapped Starla admits to being jealous of Abby due to Harry saying his daughter was the most magical thing that ever happened in his life, while Abby confesses she was jealous of Starla because she'd see Starla do the act with her father, while Abby herself was never any good at magic. When Dan holds Abby's hand inside the box to comfort her, it triggers the mechanism to open it, and they are freed. Meanwhile, Julianne tries to get Wyatt to lighten up after he adopts a new cynical attitude. After several failed attempts, a batch of "special" brownies does the trick.
41	12	"A Little Night Court Music"	Ren Bell	Julie Mandel-Folly & Bennett Webber	March 11, 2025	T12.19314	1.71
As Dan continues to be frustrated by the continual rejection of his memoir by publishers, his old nemesis Sy Huffman visits the courthouse, and offers to turn Dan's life story into a Broadway play, with Dan having complete creative control. Dan agrees, and Huffman then seeks a financial backer. But when a potential investor insists her granddaughter be given the lead role in the play, Huffman decides to turn the play into the story of Abby's life to accommodate the new lead actress. Dan then cuts ties with Huffman, and - with help from the rest of the court staff - moves to take matters into his own hands, leading to a musical number performed by the staff, viewed by a courthouse audience of potential backers. The staff's performance causes Huffman to reconsider and agree to back the play as is, but Huffman then is arrested by the FBI on fraud charges, leading to the play being scrapped.
42	13	"A Few Good Hens"	Jody Margolin Hahn	Lenny Len & Etan Manasse-Piha	March 25, 2025	T12.19311	1.95
Bob and June Wheeler need Dan to defend them on charges their chickens caused damage to a nearby massage parlor. Julianne eventually challenges Dan to show his mettle as a lawyer with a wager, which he accepts. Dan gets the Wheelers' daughter - who is also an executive with a chicken feed company - to confess that the feed is filled with steroids; this caused the chickens to become aggressive, and thus the Wheelers were not liable for the damage. However, the Wheelers accept the plea offer Julianne offered, resulting in Dan losing both the case and the bet. The Wheelers then reveal that they took the plea to score a cash settlement from the feed company. When they offer Dan a cut, he declines so as not to have any of the "Wheeler Curse" that would go along with it. Meanwhile, Abby starts dating Crash, an Ivy-League educated, charity volunteer. But Crash is soon revealed to be Bob and June's son and thus, a possessor of the "Wheeler Curse". This forces Abby to break it off with him.
43	14	"Hot to Trot"	Ren Bell	Teleplay by : Beau Batchelor & Sophia Crisafulli; Story by : Alex Sobotowski	April 1, 2025	T12.19313	1.66
In an attempt to get back together with Jake, Abby befriends his mother Susan and the ladies start hanging out together. Susan then throws a 1970s themed birthday party for herself, where she invites Abby in hopes of Jake reuniting with her and dumping his current girlfriend Lucy. Jake realizes what his mother and Abby were up to and tells Abby he is happy with Lucy, but would like to be friends with Abby, which Abby begrudgingly accepts while a tipsy Susan begins to bond with Lucy. Meanwhile, Julianne's wealthy eccentric aunt dies and leaves her with a horse. Disappointed that she did not get any money, Julianne then gives the horse to Flobert. After going over the will more carefully, it is learned the horse is worth millions, and Dan tries to worm his way into being Flobert's money manager to get a cut of the horse's value for himself. However Flobert decides to let the horse run loose, taking off towards New Jersey, leading to a mad chase to catch the animal (and the money).
44	15	"Passing the Bar"	Lynda Tarryk	Jessica Elaina Eason & Rebecca Delgado Smith & Lindsey Shockley	April 22, 2025	T12.19315	1.56
Wyatt passes the bar exam and officially becomes a lawyer, throwing a party at a nearby bar. He invites his old college buddy Goose, who is a recovering alcoholic. Abby (a recovering alcoholic herself) agrees to keep an eye on him. After going to the party, Goose loses his job, sees his girlfriend cheat on him, and cannot order his favorite mozzarella sticks. After losing sight of Goose at the party, Abby worries that he will start drinking, when Dan arrives and talks about how he dealt with his late wife Sarah's recovery from alcoholism, revealing that sometimes you just have to let it go and let whatever happens happen, with Wyatt revealing that he is tired of constantly bailing Goose out of trouble. Goose - who had stepped out to talk with his sponsor on the phone - overhears Wyatt and agrees with him that he had to take responsibility for his own behavior. Wyatt and Goose then make amends. Meanwhile, Gurgs runs a lottery for items out of the evidence locker. Dan, Julianne, and Flobert scheme to try to get a good number to have their pick of the items.
45	16	"Blood Moonstruck"	Ren Bell	Lon Zimmet & Shawn Parikh	April 29, 2025	T12.19316	1.74
On the night of the blood moon, Abby and Gurgs help Julianne with a surprising romantic prospect.
46	17	"Funnest Judge in the City"	Nikki Lorre	Mathew Harawitz & Laura Gutin Peterson	May 6, 2025	T12.19317	1.90
Abby suspects the courthouse's new "fun judge" (Michael Urie) may not be as fun as he seems. Gurgs must regain control when her new courthouse welcome video, starring Roz, takes on a life of its own.
47	18	"A Decent Proposal"	Phill Lewis	Dan Rubin & Caroline Fox	May 6, 2025	T12.19318	1.63
Abby finds herself in charge of two runaway teens who had come to New York to marry. Abby tries unsuccessfully to talk them out of it, then pretends to marry them which forces the girl to admit that she is too young for marriage. Jake intends to propose to Abby when he finds her with a man who walked into her office and kissed her (a surprise appearance by Simon Helberg). Jake asks who he is, and he introduces himself as Abby's husband and shows Jake his wedding ring.

== Production ==
=== Development ===
On December 16, 2020, it was announced that Warner Bros. Television Studios and NBC were developing a Night Court sequel series. John Larroquette was slated to reprise his role as Dan Fielding, and produce the show. Melissa Rauch, who initiated the project, and her husband Winston Rauch were to be executive producers, for After January Productions. Dan Rubin would write the series, and be an executive producer as well.

On May 3, 2021, the series was given a pilot order by NBC, and on September 24, 2021, was given a series order. On February 2, 2023, NBC renewed the series for a second season. On May 3, 2024, NBC renewed the series for an 18-episode third season. On May 9, 2025, NBC canceled the series after three seasons.

=== Casting ===
Larroquette was already attached to the series when it was announced on December 16, 2020. Although Rauch was not originally expected to act in the show, on April 30, 2021, it was reported that she would play the leading role of Judge Abby Stone, the daughter of the original series character Harry Stone.

In June 2021, Ana Villafañe joined the cast as Monica, an assistant district attorney, and Lacretta was cast as Donna "Gurgs" Gurganous, a court bailiff. In July 2021, Kapil Talwalkar was cast as Neil, a court clerk.

Villafañe left the series after shooting the original pilot. In March 2022, India de Beaufort was cast as Olivia, a prosecutor, in a "reimagining" of Villafañe's role, as a second pilot episode was then shot. On December 28, 2023, it was announced that Kapil Talwalkar will not be returning for the second season. On January 18, 2024, it was reported that Nyambi Nyambi was promoted to a series regular.

On February 13, 2024, while talking to reporters, John Larroquette admitted feeling a little sad when he first walked on the set of the Night Court revival, due to his being one of very few cast members from the original run still living. But as time went on, he started feeling better and credited co-star/executive producer Melissa Rauch for rejuvenating the franchise.

On May 21, 2024, it was announced that de Beaufort would not be returning for the third season. On July 10, 2024, Wendie Malick was promoted as a series regular for the third season.

=== Filming ===
Night Court was filmed at Warner Bros. Studios in Burbank, California, but it is set in New York City, New York.

== Release ==
=== Broadcast ===
Night Court premiered on NBC on January 17, 2023. The second season premiered on December 23, 2023. The third season premiered on November 19, 2024.

=== Home media ===
Night Court: The Complete First Season was released in Region 1 on October 17, 2023 by Warner Bros. Home Entertainment.

== Reception ==
=== Critical response ===
The review aggregator website Rotten Tomatoes reported a 74% approval rating with an average rating of 6.5/10, based on 23 critic reviews. The website's critics consensus reads, "This revival retains enough of the original Night Court's spirit to ward off objections from fans while offering a somewhat stale sitcom format to newcomers, but it ought to sustain interest when judged alongside its own peers." Metacritic, which uses a weighted average, assigned a score of 62 out of 100 based on 16 critics, indicating "generally favorable reviews". Much different is the user score, indicating "generally unfavorable reviews" instead.

William Hughes of The A.V. Club gave the series a B and said, "If you're curious about it, don't let the pilot throw you off, at least; check back in a few episodes later, once the show has actually hit its (often pretty funny) comedic stride."

=== Ratings ===
==== Overall ====
Viewership and ratings per season of Night Court
Season	Timeslot (ET)	Episodes	First aired		Last aired		TV season
Season	Timeslot (ET)	Episodes	Date	Viewers (millions)	Date	Viewers (millions)	TV season
1	Tuesday 8:00 p.m. (1, 3–16); Tuesday 8:30 p.m. (2)	16	January 17, 2023	7.55	May 9, 2023	2.42	2022–23
2	Saturday 8:35 p.m. (1); Tuesday 8:00 p.m. (2–13)	13	December 23, 2023	2.58	March 26, 2024	2.81	2023–24
3	Tuesday 8:30 p.m. (1–16, 18); Tuesday 8:00 p.m. (17)	18	November 19, 2024	2.52	May 6, 2025	1.63	2024–25

==== Season 1 ====
Viewership and ratings per episode of Night Court
No.	Title	Air date	Rating (18–49)	Viewers (millions)	DVR (18–49)	DVR viewers (millions)	Total (18–49)	Total viewers (millions)
1	"Pilot"	January 17, 2023	1.0	7.55	0.3	2.07	1.3	9.63
2	"The Nighthawks"	January 17, 2023	0.9	6.94	0.3	2.18	1.3	9.12
3	"Just Tuesday"	January 24, 2023	0.7	5.17	—N/a	—N/a	—N/a	—N/a
4	"Dan v. Dating"	January 31, 2023	0.6	4.77	—N/a	—N/a	—N/a	—N/a
5	"The Apartment"	February 7, 2023	0.6	4.22	—N/a	—N/a	—N/a	—N/a
6	"Justice Buddies"	February 14, 2023	0.5	3.78	—N/a	—N/a	—N/a	—N/a
7	"Train Court"	February 21, 2023	0.5	3.69	—N/a	—N/a	—N/a	—N/a
8	"Blood Moon Binga"	February 28, 2023	0.5	3.56	—N/a	—N/a	—N/a	—N/a
9	"Two Peas on a Pod"	March 7, 2023	0.6	3.93	—N/a	—N/a	—N/a	—N/a
10	"Marathon-Thon-Thon-Thon-Thon"	March 14, 2023	0.4	3.55	—N/a	—N/a	—N/a	—N/a
11	"Ready or Knot"	March 28, 2023	0.4	3.39	—N/a	—N/a	—N/a	—N/a
12	"Da Club"	April 4, 2023	0.4	3.29	—N/a	—N/a	—N/a	—N/a
13	"Past Apps"	April 11, 2023	0.3	2.77	—N/a	—N/a	—N/a	—N/a
14	"When Abby Met Gabby"	April 25, 2023	0.4	2.86	—N/a	—N/a	—N/a	—N/a
15	"The Honorable Dan Fielding, Part 1"	May 2, 2023	0.3	3.02	—N/a	—N/a	—N/a	—N/a
16	"The Honorable Dan Fielding, Part 2"	May 9, 2023	0.4	2.42	—N/a	—N/a	—N/a	—N/a

==== Season 2 ====
Viewership and ratings per episode of Night Court
No.	Title	Air date	Rating (18–49)	Viewers (millions)
1	"A Night Court Before Christmas"	December 23, 2023	0.5	2.58
2	"The Roz Affair"	January 2, 2024	0.4	3.77
3	"Form Fetish"	January 9, 2024	0.4	3.38
4	"Just the Fax, Dan"	January 16, 2024	0.4	3.43
5	"Hold the Pickles, Keep the Change"	January 23, 2024	0.3	2.95
6	"Wrath of Comic-Con"	January 30, 2024	0.3	3.02
7	"A Crime of Fashion"	February 6, 2024	0.3	3.31
8	"Broadway Danny Gurgs"	February 13, 2024	0.3	2.91
9	"Taught and Bothered"	February 20, 2024	0.3	2.51
10	"Chips Ahoy"	March 5, 2024	0.3	2.88
11	"Wheelers of Fortune"	March 12, 2024	0.3	3.05
12	"The Duke's a Hazard"	March 19, 2024	0.3	2.81
13	"The Best Dan"	March 26, 2024	0.3	2.81

==== Season 3 ====
Viewership and ratings per episode of Night Court
No.	Title	Air date	Rating/share (18–49)	Viewers (millions)	DVR (18–49)	DVR viewers (millions)	Total (18–49)	Total viewers (millions)	Ref.
1	"The Judge's Boyfriend's Dad, Part 1"	November 19, 2024	0.3/3	2.52	0.1	0.74	0.4	3.26	
2	"The Judge's Boyfriend's Dad, Part 2"	November 26, 2024	0.3/4	2.39	0.1	0.75	0.4	3.14	
3	"The Hole Truth"	December 3, 2024	0.3/3	2.27	0.1	0.77	0.3	3.04	
4	"Feliz NaviDead"	December 17, 2024	0.2/3	2.07	0.1	0.66	0.3	2.72	
5	"Mayim Worst Enemy"	January 14, 2025	0.2/3	2.16	0.1	0.72	0.3	2.88	
6	"The Jakeout"	January 21, 2025	0.2/2	1.96	0.1	0.65	0.3	2.61	
7	"Rebound and Down"	January 28, 2025	0.2/2	1.72	0.1	0.67	0.3	2.43	
8	"Age Against the Machine"	February 4, 2025	0.2/3	1.78	0.1	0.61	0.3	2.39	
9	"AB-ventures in Babysitting"	February 11, 2025	0.3/4	2.07	0.1	0.64	0.3	2.71	
10	"Pension Tension"	February 18, 2025	0.3/3	1.88	0.1	0.60	0.3	2.48	
11	"Abracadabra Alaka-Dan"	February 25, 2025	0.2/3	1.81	0.1	0.57	0.3	2.37	
12	"A Little Night Court Music"	March 11, 2025	0.2/3	1.71	0.1	0.55	0.3	2.25	
13	"A Few Good Hens"	March 25, 2025	0.2/3	1.95	0.1	0.64	0.3	2.60	
14	"Hot to Trot"	April 1, 2025	0.2/3	1.66	TBD	TBD	TBD	TBD	
15	"Passing the Bar"	April 22, 2025	0.2/2	1.56	TBD	TBD	TBD	TBD	
16	"Blood Moonstruck"	April 29, 2025	0.2/3	1.74	TBD	TBD	TBD	TBD	
17	"Funnest Judge in the City"	May 6, 2025	0.2/3	1.90	TBD	TBD	TBD	TBD	
18	"A Decent Proposal"	May 6, 2025	0.2/2	1.63	TBD	TBD	TBD	TBD	
