= Jane by Design =

2012 American comedy-drama television series

- Genre: Comedy drama
- Created by: April Blair
- Starring: Erica Dasher; Nick Roux; Rowly Dennis; David Clayton Rogers; India de Beaufort; Meagan Tandy; Matthew Atkinson; Andie MacDowell
- Opening theme: "Work of Art" by Rachel Platten
- Composer: Gabriel Mann
- Country of origin: United States
- Original language: English
- No. of seasons: 1
- No. of episodes: 18

Production
- Executive producers: Gavin Polone; John Ziffren; April Blair
- Producers: David Hartle; Kathy Landsberg; Lenn K. Rosenfield
- Production locations: Santa Clarita, California; Paris; London
- Cinematography: Mark Doering-Powell
- Editor: Natakia Simmons
- Running time: 40–44 minutes
- Production companies: Pariah Television; April Blair's Logo

Original release
- Network: ABC Family
- Release: January 3 – July 31, 2012

Jane by Design is an American comedy-drama television series on ABC Family. The series follows the life of Jane Quimby (Erica Dasher), a teenager who is mistaken for an adult, as she finally gets her fashion dream job working with a world-famous designer, Gray Chandler Murray (Andie MacDowell). She has to juggle between two secret lives: one in high school, and one in high fashion.

ABC Family greenlit the series in April 2011 with a ten-episode order. The series premiered on January 3, 2012, following Switched at Birth. On February 29, 2012, the series was given an eight-episode back order. It premiered in the summer on June 5, 2012, and ended on July 31, 2012. On August 17, 2012, ABC Family announced that the show was canceled after one season.

== Premise ==
Jane Quimby, (Erica Dasher) is a teenager, mistaken for an adult, who lands her fashion dream job. She must balance her high school life and her job. She has her best friend Billy (Nick Roux) help her out, although he had a relationship with Lulu (Meagan Tandy), a girl who has been mean to Jane since the seventh grade. Now Billy dates the new girl, Zoe, which makes Jane feel like he's replacing her. Jane's father died and her mother ran out on Jane and Ben before the series started. Jane's mother has returned home to Jane and Ben, and she stays awhile. Her brother Ben (David Clayton Rogers) tries to make money by getting jobs, but the jobs never work out until he lands one as the athletic assistant at Jane's school. At Donovan Decker, Jane discovers a world full of fashion challenges working for Gray Chandler Murray (Andie MacDowell) and tackles them with the help of her co-workers, Jeremy Jones (Rowley Dennis), India Jourdain (India de Beaufort), Carter (Ser'Darius Blain) and Birdie (Brooke Lyons). Jane tries to be the best at her job and her school, juggling the everyday challenges of high school and the world of fashion.

== Cast and characters ==
=== Main ===
- Erica Dasher as Jane Quimby, the main protagonist and a high-school student who is also a personal assistant to fashion designer Gray. Everyone at her work doesn't know shes in high school and she keeps it a secret from everyone at school except Billy and eventually her brother Ben. Jane has an older brother Ben, and after their father's death, he is made her guardian. Besides Ben, Jane has Billy in her life as her best friend, with whom she shares all her secrets. Jane has been shown to have crushes on Nick Fadden, Eli Chandler, and Jeremy Jones.
- Nick Roux as Billy Nutter, Jane's best friend since childhood. Billy had a secret physical relationship with "it girl" Lulu, but ends it after realizing that she doesn't want to go public with it. He later starts dating Lulu publicly, much to Jane's dismay. They later break up after he was publicly called trash (along with his brother) at a party, held by Nick Fadden, and Lulu made no move to defend him. He left the party with his brother while Lulu stayed. In the mid-season finale, Billy had tried to reveal his feelings toward Jane telling her "It's you, Janey" but was interrupted by Jeremy. After spending two months in juvenile detention for helping his brother try to escape the scene of a crime, Billy returned to school wanting to keep his friendship with Jane intact. He met Zoe, an apparently rebellious student, telling her he enjoyed being with someone who didn't judge him like Lulu, unaware that Zoe is wealthy herself. He discovers the truth but still wants to be with her. He never again tries to be with Jane but Jane realizes she wants to be with him. He takes over as the lead in the school play opposite Zoe when Nick gets hurt.
- Rowly Dennis as Jeremy Jones, Jane's coworker and a "ladies' man". He has been shown to like Jane. He was seeing India, but later broke it off after she stole Jane's wedding gown design. In the mid-season finale "The End of the Line", it was revealed that Jeremy was the mole hired by Beau Bronn to steal Donovan Decker's designs. When India returns as a consultant, she tells Jeremy she knows the truth and threatens to expose him unless he helps her take down Gray. At Jane's birthday party, a drunken Jeremy confesses to Jane the truth and she walks away upset. Then Jeremy runs away when Jane threatens to tell Gray.
- David Clayton Rogers as Benjamin "Ben" Quimby, Jane's older brother. After the death of their father, he becomes Jane's guardian. He works at Jane's high school as the assistant athletic director and is friends with the guidance counselor Rita Shaw, who he used to make fun of in high school. He realizes his feelings for Rita on the school camping trip when he comes to odds with another teacher who has set his sights on Rita. After their mother returns Ben takes the opportunity to finally live out his lifelong dream when he is offered a minor league baseball contract. In the series finale he returns to be there for Jane and also to tell Rita that he wants to get back together.
- India de Beaufort as India Jourdain, the series' main antagonist and Jane's pretentious colleague. She always tries to sabotage Jane and steal Gray's job. But many times she does show true emotion and kindness only to rebuff it with her bad attitude. In the mid-season finale, she is wrongfully accused of being the mole in Donovan Decker, and fired by Gray. She returns, now working for Harrod's department store and the firm has to impress her to win a contract. She secretly confronts Jeremy, having realized he was the mole and threatens to expose him unless he helps her take down both Gray and Jane.
- Meagan Tandy as Lulu Pope, the antagonist in Jane's high school life and daughter of a judge and an It girl of the high school. She seems to like Billy, but wants to keep her relationship with him a secret. She later decides to go public with their relationship, but still feels embarrassed over their relationship. She is rather hostile towards Jane and shows jealousy of Jane and Billy's friendship. A regular cast member in the first ten episodes, in episode "The Replacement", Tandy was demoted to recurring status.
- Matthew Atkinson as Nick Fadden, Jane's schoolgirl crush since the seventh grade. He does, however seem to show interest in Jane, even going as far as to ask Billy and Ben's advice on approaching her. They then begin to date much to Billy's dismay. He and Billy become friends but their friendship and his and Jane's relationship ends when he cheats on her with Lulu Pope. While he and Lulu are dating, he still has feelings for Jane. He plays baseball, but he tore a shoulder ligament. Since he can't play baseball, the new drama teacher tells him to audition for her new play based on Cinderella. He auditions for the role of "Prince Charming" and gets it. On the eve of the play he sprains an ankle, leaving the lead to Billy.
- Andie MacDowell as Gray Chandler Murray, a world-famous fashion designer at Donovan Decker, and Jane's boss. She's very strict and straightforward, and is certain India wants to steal her job. Although she is defined as a heartless woman, she does acknowledge Jane's value as her assistant on occasion. She was promoted as Creative Director of Donovan Decker.

=== Recurring ===
- Smith Cho as Rita Shaw, the guidance counselor at Jane's high school, who often gives Ben advice about his job and about being a guardian to Jane. She revealed to Ben that she had a crush on him back when they were in high school, however he was not very nice to her during those years. They kiss in the episode "The Getaway" and dated until the episode "The Celebrity", when she breaks up with him, because he was going too fast. However, when Amanda Clark, "the popular girl" from Rita and Ben's school days appears and shows an interest in Ben, Rita becomes jealous.
- Ser'Darius Blain as Carter, a Donovan Decker employee, who Jane always asks for a favor.
- Brooke Lyons as Birdie, the human resources director of Donovan Decker who is often helpful to Jane.
- Bryan Dechart as Eli Chandler, Gray's nephew, who now works for the Donovan Decker company. As of the episode "The Backup Dress," he and Jane were once dating but then they break up because Eli cheated with India. Eli also believes Jane should be with Billy since she only really tells him her secrets.
- Mariah Buzolin as Zoe Mendez, a new transfer student who shows interest in Billy. She comes off as a cocky and troublemaking student who Billy likes as an equal. He was unaware that Zoe was from a wealthy family until he followed her home after a date, believing she planned to rob a mansion and learned that the mansion was actually her home.
- Briga Heelan as Amanda Clark, a big-time actress, former "popular girl" of Whitemarsh High School and is now the drama teacher there. She begins showing romantic interest in Ben, much to Rita's dismay.
- Christopher B. Duncan as Judge Bentley Pope, Lulu's strict father who disapproves of her dating Billy.
- Rob Mayes as Tommy Nutter, Billy's troublesome older brother who has been in Judge Pope's courtroom many times.
- Oded Fehr as Beau Bronn, Gray's ex-husband and fashion nemesis.
- Teri Hatcher as Kate Quimby, Ben and Jane's long lost mother. It was previously reported that Hatcher was to direct an episode of the series (marking her directorial debut), however this did not occur.
- David Goldman as Vice Principal Jenkins, the Vice Principal at Jane's high school.

=== Special cameo appearances ===
- Patricia Field as Herself
- Stefano Tonchi as Himself
- Nanette Lepore as Herself
- Christos Garkinos as Himself
- Cameron Silver as Himself
- Rose Apodaca as Herself
- Betsey Johnson as Herself
- Amy Astley as Herself
- Paulina Porizkova as Herself
- Brandon Holley as Himself
- Booth Moore as Herself
- Christopher Benz as Himself
- Kelly Osbourne as Herself
- Christian Siriano as Himself
- Tamara Mellon as Herself
- Nina Garcia as Herself

== Episodes ==
No.	Title	Directed by	Written by	Original release date	U.S. viewers (millions)
1	"Pilot"	Lev L. Spiro	April Blair	January 3, 2012	1.61
Jane Quimby, a high-school student applying for an internship, is mistaken for a qualified adult applicant and is hired by Gray Chandler Murray, a high maintenance fashion designer. She must now juggle her life as a high school student, a fashion designer and as the breadwinner living with her unemployed older brother.
2	"The Runway"	Michael Lange	April Blair	January 10, 2012	1.12
Jane is thrilled when her middle school crush, Nick, asks her to the Winter Formal, until she realizes the event is the same evening as an important company preview party that Gray told her to plan. Nick sees Jane's best friend Billy and It-girl Lulu kissing. After which, Billy asks that Nick keep it secret. Jane must juggle an evening at the winter formal and the fashion runway. When one of the dresses rips in the fashion show Jane must save the day with one of the dresses she made.
3	"The Birkin"	Michael Katleman	Amy Rardin & Jessica O'Toole	January 17, 2012	1.33
Gray gives Jane a list of things to do for a few days that includes breaking up with Brad (Hartley Sawyer), her twenty-something model boyfriend. Gray also gives Jane a Birkin bag as a reward. Ben begins working as the athletic assistant at Jane's school. Jane and Lulu learn that they are tied to become class valedictorian.
4	"The Finger Bowl"	Arlene Sanford	John A. Norris	January 24, 2012	1.48
Jane comes to the aid of a stressed-out Jeremy, who's intent on wooing a demanding fashion editor with high expectations that could help or hurt his career. Jane also finds out about Billy and Lulu while Billy and Jane's friendship hangs by a thread.
5	"The Look Book"	Gavin Polone	Flint Wainess	January 31, 2012	1.35
Jane is tasked with her biggest assignment yet: protecting Donovan Decker's top-secret "look book", a collection of the company's upcoming fashion line, and delivering it to Gray in Paris. But when she loses it somewhere in the city, it turns into a mad-dash hunt against the clock.
6	"The Image Issue"	Melanie Mayron	Deirdre Shaw	February 7, 2012	1.12
Jane objects to India's research on high school students and fashion, so Gray gives Jane a research project. Jane puts together a video presentation for work that involves her interviewing people from high school. Billy tries out a new look in hopes of gaining respect from Lulu's father. Jane and Nick have their first kiss.
7	"The Teen Model"	Phil Traill	Melissa Carter	February 14, 2012	1.11
Jane has to take charge of an erratic teen model named Piper Grace (Lili Simmons) -- who discovers Jane's big secret. Piper agrees to remain silent, if Jane will do one favor for her. Tired of Jane's behavior, Ben decides to ground her.
8	"The Wedding Gown"	Michael Grossman	Emily Fox	February 21, 2012	1.34
Jeremy must design a wedding dress for famous socialite Charlotte Whitmore (Autumn Reeser) who's marrying a prince; well, not a prince actually. Jane has the perfect dress, but India takes credit for it, even though the design has special meaning for Jane. Jane arranges for Nick and Billy to get to know each other. Nick and Billy play pool against two guys -- and it leads to a fight. Nick hopes Jane can make it to his baseball game, but the wedding dress drama may complicate that.
9	"The Getaway"	Howard Deutch	John A. Norris	February 28, 2012	0.96
The high school goes on a camping trip. Jane wants to go with Nick; India insists Jane go with her for a business trip. Jane meets Beau (Oded Fehr) and is shocked to learn Gray is still married to him. Jane, India, and Beau's assistant Christopher (Brandon Jones) end up at a hotel bar together, where Jane opens up about her feelings for Nick. While camping, Lulu and Nick complain about their relationships with Jane and Billy, respectively. They share a kiss, and Billy sees them. Ben goes to Donovan Decker looking around for Jane and finds out that Jane's job isn't an internship like he thought. Tommy asks Billy to help him in a robbery as a getaway driver. Billy refuses but later he changes his mind, and they are both caught by the police.
10	"The End of the Line"	Phil Traill	April Blair & Paul Haapaniemi	March 6, 2012	1.20
The aftermath of Tommy's robbery has legal consequences that lead Billy to get live through his worst nightmare, being before Judge Bentley Pope – Lulu's father. Now with Ben knowing what is going on with Jane's other life, he demands that she quit. It is revealed that Jeremy is the mole working for Beau, stealing the designs from Donovan Decker. However, India is wrongfully accused by Jane of being the mole, Gray overhears this and fires India on the spot. Things are tense and awkward with Nick and Jane after Billy reveals to her that Nick kissed Lulu on the camping trip; Nick and Jane break up. Tommy prepares to get out of town, encourages Billy to express his feelings for Jane at the Donovan Decker show in Lincoln Center, while Jeremy expresses his feelings for her too.
11	"The Replacement"	Jim Hayman	April Blair	June 5, 2012	1.36
Billy is released from juvenile hall and refuses to be open with Jane about his feelings for her. Jane realizes she may have a chance at getting India's job now that Gray is depending on her more, but she faces some tough competition. Ben struggles to keep Jane's secret from Rita.
12	"The Celebrity"	Gavin Polone	April Blair	June 12, 2012	1.34
The Donovan Decker team must win approval of India, who is now the style director for the Harrods department store. Aiden Chase (Parker Young), a male celebrity, is chosen to model with clothes designed by Donovan Decker. Rita feels uncomfortable with Ben moving things forward in their relationship, with Rita deciding to break up with him. Billy becomes friendly with a new female student, Zoe (Mariah Buzolin).
13	"The Surprise"	Phil Traill	John A. Norris	June 19, 2012	1.30
It is Jane's birthday and Ben has her thinking that everyone forgot but really he has planned a special surprise birthday party for her. At work, Gray also surprises Jane with the help of Eli. India is still threatening Jeremy to tell Gray that he is Beau's mole. Billy gets close with Zoe. At the end of the episode, it is shown that Zoe is lying to Billy as she walks towards her real home, indicating she is rich like Lulu. Jane and Ben are surprised by their mother Kate (Teri Hatcher).
14	"The Second Chance"	Millicent Shelton	Melissa Carter	June 26, 2012	1.08
Jane decides to slowly forgive her mother Kate for walking out on her and Ben years ago. But Ben continues to have resentment towards Kate. Jane gives Jeremy an ultimatum, either tell Gray about being Beau's mole or she will, Jeremy then leaves town with the designs for Harrods without telling anyone. Leaving Jane having to work with Eli and India to recreate the designs. Amanda Clark (Briga Heelan), an actress who used to go to school with Ben and Rita, is hired as the new drama teacher for the school. Amanda then makes her move on Ben, igniting a competition with Rita. Billy learns Zoe's secret about her being rich.
15	"The Online Date"	Phil Traill	Lenn K. Rosenfeld	July 10, 2012	1.30
Beau is engaged to a younger woman, so Kate sets up an online dating profile for Gray, much to Jane's displeasure. Amanda has auditions for a Cinderella school play, with Zoe and Nick chosen as the leads. Amanda and Rita continue to compete for Ben's attention. Billy agrees to meet Zoe's parents, later finding out that they are a gay male couple. Kate's ex-boyfriend Dakota shows up in town and proposes to her.
16	"The Backup Dress"	Daisy von Scherler Mayer	Deirdre Shaw	July 17, 2012	1.28
Jane and Billy volunteer in backstage work for the Cinderella play, starring Zoe and Nick. Kate gives Zoe the dress that Jane made, leaving Jane without a dress to wear for her first official date with Eli. Ben gets a chance to play minor league baseball in Ohio. Jane and Eli's date gets complicated, with the buyer of the dress made by Donovan Decker appearing in the same restaurant as Jane, while Jane is wearing the same exact dress previously labeled as the "backup dress". Kate accepts Dakota's proposal and heads out to Colorado. Jane is left alone in the house since Ben and Kate went on their own journeys.
17	"The Sleepover"	Gavin Polone	Story by : April Blair & Paul Haapaniemi; Teleplay by : Paul Haapaniemi	July 24, 2012	1.41
Jane has to go to London to get Jeremy back, as the deal between Harrods and Donovan Decker is on the line. Billy attempts to repair his relationship with Zoe, as Zoe becomes increasingly jealous of Billy's friendship with Jane. While Jane is in London, Eli sleeps with India.
18	"The Bonus Check"	Gavin Polone	Joey Murphy & John Pardee	July 31, 2012	1.18
Jane receives a $5,000 bonus check for saving the Harrods deal. Nick sprains his ankle before his performance in the school play. Billy takes his place since he knows all the lines in the play. Jane gives up her bonus check money to fund the play since the costumes were ruined, the lights wouldn't work and Jane sees how much this play means to everyone, especially Billy. With her mother unavailable to help with the costumes, Jane enlists the Donovan Decker staff to help at finishing the costumes. Jane begins to realize her true feelings for Billy after finding out that Eli slept with india. Amanda invites Donavan Decker to the play and Eli and Gray go. They question and love the costumes so they go backstage only to find Jane there.

== Cancellation and intended season 2 plans ==
On August 17, 2012, ABC Family announced that the series was canceled. On August 21, 2012, in an interview with Hollywoodlife.com, creator/executive producer April Blair revealed the plans that she had for the show's second season. The storylines that were to happen in season two were: Eli would find out about Jane's secret and would cover for her from Gray ever finding out. Jane and Billy share their first kiss. Ben and Rita become engaged. Jeremy would start his own independent fashion label competing with Donovan Decker and his romance with India would continue to grow, along with them being professional rivals. Amanda would begin dating a teacher named Todd (who previously had romantic feelings for Rita), as well as continuing to compete with Rita. Lastly, Kate would return to town.

== International broadcasts ==
=== South Pacific ===
In New Zealand on TVNZ's TV2 from April 15, 2012 (Sunday afternoon). The show resumed airing from episode 11 on December 22, 2013.

=== Europe ===
On Fox Life in Russia from March 12, 2012, under the title В стиле Джейн, Portugal from June 24, 2012, Greece from October 1, 2012, and Bulgaria from October 3, 2012, under the title В стил Джейн.

In Spain on MTV Spain from May 2, 2012 under the title Diseñando a Jane.

In Italy on DeeJay TV from October 2, 2012, under the title Jane stilista per caso.

In Germany on Disney Channel from May 31, 2015, under the title Jane by Design.

=== Africa ===
In South Africa on M-Net Series from June 1, 2012.

=== Americas ===
In Mexico, El Salvador and Venezuela on Sony Spin from June 18, 2012.

In Canada on ABC Spark from September 4, 2012.

=== Asia ===
In Hong Kong, Indonesia, Malaysia, Myanmar, Philippines, Singapore, Taiwan, Thailand, and Vietnam on STAR World from August 7, 2012.

== Home media release ==
DVD release dates for Jane by Design
Season	Region 1	Region 2	Region 4	Ep #	Discs #	Additional information
Season 1 - Volume 1	March 20, 2012	TBA	TBA	10	2	The first ten episodes of the series
Season 1 - Volume 2	TBA	TBA	TBA	8	2	

Jane by Design: Season 1, Volume 1 contains the first ten episodes of the series. It was released as a two-disc box set on Region 1 DVD in the US and Canada on March 20, 2012. All episodes of Jane by Design are also available through Hulu as well as Amazon Video and the iTunes Store where each episode can be purchased separately or as the complete series.

In Japan, the show is known as 地味っこジェーンの大胆な放課後. A Japanese DVD was released on February 4, 2015. It is currently available through Amazon Japan Prime Video, GyaO, and Rakuten TV.

== Critical reception ==
Jane by Design received initially mixed critical reviews. Metacritic gave the pilot episode 54 out of 100, based upon 7 critical reviews. The New York Daily News gave show with 60/100 commenting that the "drama thickens fast, and if the creators keep stirring rapidly, 'Jane by Design' could become the same good soapy fun as its best ABC Family 'Sister, Sister' and compared with 'The Devil Wears Prada.'"

"There are worse ideas, and Jane by Design has the potential to be an amusing and endearing show — thanks largely to the performance of Erica Dasher as Jane Quimby, the smart and plucky star who steps into the Anne Hathaway role." The New York Times wrote of the series that "It's refreshing, and ultimately unnerving, to see just how naïve Jane Quimby (Erica Dasher) is at the outset of Jane by Design."

Los Angeles Times gave the show its highest score, with 70/100, commenting that the show "is not merely pandering to the teenage base. 'Jane by Design' is a font of fulfilled wishes, but they come from actual work, even if that work is presented in kicky-fun, pop-driven montage. The show is aspirational and at times genuinely exciting. You care enough about Jane, thanks in large part to Dasher, who is charming and funny, that you want her to have her cake and her ice cream too." Pittsburgh Post-Gazette saying "Jane is a decent enough little show but it's difficult to imagine how its writers will manage to sustain the premise." People Weekly compared with Ugly Betty TV Guide gave the show with negative critical and says "[A] toothless hourlong teen-com." "If stealing from The Devil Wears Prada wasn't enough, there are also echoes of the far superior Ugly Betty in the workplace (including an evil co-worker out for Andie's job) and Pretty in Pink at school, where Jane hangs with a faux-hawked hipster misfit best bud who somehow isn't named Duckie. In the first episode, Jane risks missing a vital midterm if she attends a critical meeting called by her boss's rival. In the second episode, once again double-booked, she races back and forth between a high-fashion preview party and the school's winter formal, where she's scored a date with the jock she has long pined for (shades of MTV's awesome Awkward, though this is merely inept). Guess whose self-constructed party dress ends up on the runway? If only it all weren't so synthetic. How long before Jane has to choose between graduation and a cover shoot? Hoping for better later this week when Project Runway: All Stars premieres."

=== U.S. Nielsen ratings ===
The following is a table with the average estimated number of viewers per episode of Jane by Design on ABC Family.

Timeslot (ET/PT)	# Ep.	Premiered		Ended		TV Season	Viewers (in millions)
Timeslot (ET/PT)	# Ep.	Date	Premiere Viewers (in millions)	Date	Finale Viewers (in millions)	TV Season	Viewers (in millions)
Tuesday 9:00 pm	18	January 3, 2012	1.61	July 31, 2012	1.18	2012	1.27
