= Erica Dasher =

American actress

- Born: Houston, Texas, U.S.
- Occupation: Actress
- Years active: 2008–present
- Height: 5 ft 4 in (163 cm)

Erica Dasher is an American actress. She is best known for her role as Jane Quimby, the title character in the ABC Family series Jane by Design and as Alana Maynor, the lead character in the go90 series, Guidance.

== Life and education ==
Dasher was born in Houston, Texas. She attended The Village School on the west side of Houston, but moved on to Westside High School, where she graduated in 2004. She attended the University of Southern California, studying theater with the intention to become a film director and producer.

== Career ==
Dasher co-starred as Madison in The WB Television Network web series The Lake. She along with Sami Kriegstein founded the production company Not Just Dead Bodies in 2007. The company produced documentary film Double Speak. She was the lead role in the series Jane by Design for one season before it was cancelled.

Dasher also worked as a production assistant on the film Reservations in 2008.

== Filmography ==
Film
Year	Title	Role	Notes
2008	Reservations		Production assistant
2009	Speak Easy		Producer
2010	Chicken on a Pizza	Larry's Girlfriend	Short film
2011	Come Visit	Amelia	Short film
2014	Era Apocrypha		Short film
2014	Wave	Michelle	Short film
2016	Dating Daisy	Liz	
2017	The Body Tree	Alice	
2019	Ouroboros	Annette	Short film
2019	Dime		Short film
2019	Something Round	Lindsay	Short film
2024	Saint Clare	Amity Liston	

Television
Year	Title	Role	Notes
2009	Vicariously	Kristy	Episode: "The Dance"
2009	The Lake	Madison	Main role
2012	Jane by Design	Jane Quimby	Lead role
2013	CSI: Crime Scene Investigation	Carrie Sinlair	Episode: "Ghosts of the Past"
2015	NCIS: New Orleans	Sofia Freeman	Episode: "Blue Christmas"
2016	Guidance	Alana Maynor	Main role (season 2)
2018	Timeless	Alice Paul	Episode: "Mrs. Sherlock Holmes"
2026	The 'Burbs	Betsy	Recurring role
