= Kapil Talwalkar =

Indian American actor

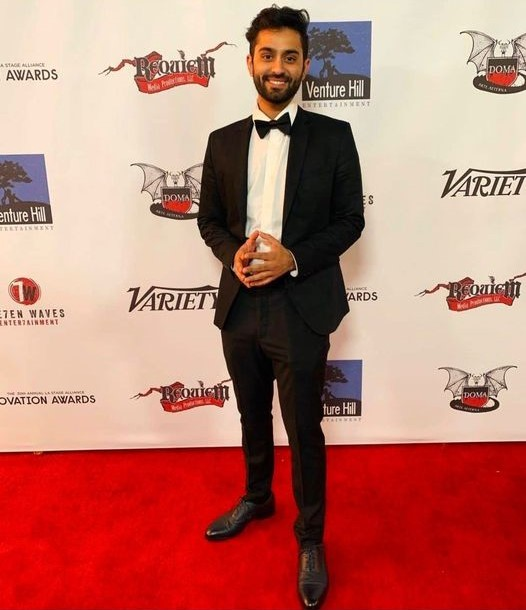
- Education: University of Southern California
- Occupations: Actor, musician
- Years active: 2015–present

Kapil Talwalkar is an Indian American actor and musician. He is best known for portraying Tobin in NBC's musical dramedy Zoey's Extraordinary Playlist and Neil Valluri in the sequel sitcom Night Court.

== Biography ==
Born in India, Talwalkar grew up in Cupertino, California. He has been acting since he was a teenager.

Talwalkar majored in international relations at USC Dornsife. He has a minor at the USC School of Dramatics Arts.

== Career ==
Talwalkar launched his professional acting career as a hip origami prodigy in Animals out of Paper, which opened East West Players’ 50th season. He was cast in Operation Othello, a pilot for a virtual reality series that was not picked up. In 2018, he was cast in the ABC drama pilot False Profits as a series regular.

He is best known for his main role as Tobin in NBC's Zoey’s Extraordinary Playlist. He reprised the role in the Roku film Zoey’s Extraordinary Christmas. He performed the songs "Don't Speak", "Tracks of My Tears", "Sing", "Shake It Off", "One", "Kiss Me" and "It's the Hard-Knock Life" during the run of the series, and "Home Sweet Home" during the movie. Talwalkar also had a recurring role in Nickelodeon’s animated series, The Loud House. In late 2021, he joined the casts of NBC's Night Court and the reboot of Charmed on The CW. On December 28, 2023, it was announced that Kapil Talwalkar will depart after one season of Night Court. He was also lead in the independent film Paper Flowers, released in 2024.

In 2025, it was announced that Talwalkar would join the cast of Peacock’s The 'Burbs as a series regular. Talwalkar has also performed in a number of theatrical productions and plays such as Philip Ridley's Radiant Vermin. He also appeared in Saheem Ali's Twelfth Night; or What You Will at The Public Theater’s Free Shakespeare in the Park at the Delacorte Theater, playing the role of Fabian opposite Lupita Nyong'o, Sandra Oh and Peter Dinklage which was broadcast on November 25, 2025 as a part of PBS' Great Performances.

== Personal life ==
His girlfriend is actress Avery Kristen Pohl. He is grandson of Marathi Veteran Actor Sharad Talwalkar.

== Filmography ==
=== Film ===
Year	Title	Role	Notes
2015	Love Pyar Whatever	Sid	
2015	Prep School	Joe	
2017	Geeta	Keshav	Short film
2018	Saint Paul	Amir	Short film
2021	Americanish	Shahid	
2021	Zoey's Extraordinary Christmas	Tobin Batra	
2024	Paper Flowers	Shalin Shah	
2024	Hema	Sahil	Short film

=== Television ===
Year	Title	Role	Notes
2018	False Profits	Ramesh	Television pilot
2019	Arranged	Jay Patel	Episode: "Pilot"
2019	American Princess	Subodh	Episode: "You Can Always Trust Your Vaganya"
2020	Bollyweird	Tyler	
2020–2021	Zoey's Extraordinary Playlist	Tobin Batra	Series regular; 24 episodes
2020–present	The Loud House	Raj, Spa Caddie (voice)	Recurring role
2022	Charmed	Dev	Recurring role; 6 episodes
2022	Home Economics	Terrance	Episode: "Poker Game, $800 Buy-In"
2022	Mira, Royal Detective	Viju (voice)	Episode: "The Mystery of the Royal Flight"
2023	Night Court	Neil	Series regular; 16 episodes
2024	Station 19	Sanjay	Episode: "This Woman's Work"
2024	My Dreams of You	Michael Roy	Television film
2026	The ‘Burbs	Naveen	Main role

=== Podcast series ===
Year	Title	Role	Notes
2021	Teardrop Hunting	Dr. Abhi Shekar	3 episodes
