= French Top 100 singles of the 1990s =

This is a list of the 100 best-selling singles in France during the 1990s (i.e. release in France from 1 January 1990 to 31 December 1999).

== Top 100 of the 1990s ==
=== Singles ===
| Pos. | Artist | Single | Year | Country | Sales | Peak |
|---|---|---|---|---|---|---|
| 1 | Daniel Lavoie, Patrick Fiori & Garou | "Belle" | 1998 | Canada; France | 2,221,000 | 1 |
| 2 | Elton John | "Candle in The Wind" | 1997 | United Kingdom | 2,029,000 | 1 |
| 3 | Lou Bega | "Mambo No. 5" | 1999 | Germany | 1,532,000 | 1 |
| 4 | Wes | "Alane" | 1997 | Cameroon | 1,418,000 | 1 |
| 5 | Manau | "La Tribu de Dana" | 1998 | France | 1,415,000 | 1 |
| 6 | Ricky Martin | "Un, Dos, Tres" | 1997 | Puerto Rico | 1,400,000 | 1 |
| 7 | Florent Pagny | "Savoir aimer" | 1997 | France | 1,234,000 | 1 |
| 8 | Aqua | "Barbie Girl" | 1997 | Denmark | 1,215,000 | 1 |
| 9 | Larusso | "Tu m'oublieras" | 1998 | France | 1,209,000 | 1 |
| 10 | Céline Dion | "The Reason" / "My Heart Will Go On" | 1998 | Canada | 1,197,000 | 1 |
| 11 | Gala | "Freed from Desire" | 1996 | Italy | 1,013,000 | 1 |
| 12 | Eiffel 65 | "Blue (Da Ba Dee)" | 1999 | Italy | 1,001,000 | 1 |
| 13 | Carrapicho | "Tic, Tic Tac" | 1996 | Brazil | 980,000 | 1 |
| 14 | Andrea Bocelli | "Con te partirò" | 1997 | Italy | 980,000 | 1 |
| 15 | Lââm | "Chanter pour ceux qui sont loin de chez eux" | 1998 | France | 963,000 | 2 |
| 16 | Céline Dion | "Pour que tu m'aimes encore" | 1995 | Canada | 955,000 | 1 |
| 17 | Moos | "Au nom de la rose" | 1999 | France | 918,000 | 1 |
| 18 | Los del Río | "Macarena" | 1996 | Spain | 910,000 | 1 |
| 19 | Andrea Bocelli & Hélène Ségara | "Vivo per lei (je vis pour elle)" | 1998 | Italy; France | 874,000 | 1 |
| 20 | Mylène Farmer | "Désenchantée" | 1991 | France | 900,000 | 1 |
| 21 | Nomads | "Yakalelo" | 1998 | France | 846,000 | 2 |
| 22 | Khaled | "Aïcha" | 1996 | Algeria | 824,000 | 1 |
| 23 | Hermes House Band | "I Will Survive" | 1998 | Netherlands | 812,000 | 3 |
| 24 | David Hallyday | "Tu ne m'as pas laissé le temps" | 1999 | France | 801,000 | 1 |
| 25 | Will Smith | "Men in Black" | 1997 | United States | 783,000 | 1 |
| 26 | Cher | "Believe" | 1999 | United States | 764,000 | 1 |
| 27 | Jordy | "Dur dur d'être bébé !" | 1992 | France | 751,000 | 1 |
| 28 | Spice Girls | "Wannabe" | 1996 | United Kingdom | 742,000 | 1 |
| 29 | Fugees | "Killing Me Softly" | 1996 | United States | 674,000 | 1 |
| 30 | Coolio | "Gangsta's Paradise" | 1995 | United States | 672,000 | 1 |
| 31 | Mylène Farmer | "Désenchantée" | 1991 | France | 1,800,000 | 1 |
| 32 | Brandy & Monica | "The Boy Is Mine" | 1998 | United States | 662,000 | 2 |
| 33 | Robert Miles | "Children" | 1996 | Switzerland | 642,000 | 1 |
| 34 | Lagaf' | "La Zoubida" | 1991 | France | 625,000 | 1 |
| 35 | Tina Arena | "Aller plus haut" | 1999 | Australia | 617,000 | 2 |
| 36 | Ménélik & Imane D | "Bye bye" | 1998 | France | 613,000 | 5 |
| 37 | Nathalie Cardone | "Hasta Siempre" | 1997 | France | 608,000 | 4 |
| 38 | Alliage & Boyzone | "Te garder près de moi" | 1997 | France; Ireland | 607,000 | 3 |
| 39 | Eiffel 65 | "Move Your Body" | 1999 | Italy | 589,000 | 1 |
| 40 | Britney Spears | "... Baby One More Time" | 1999 | United States | 578,000 | 1 |
| 41 | Lara Fabian | "Tout" | 1997 | Belgium | 566,000 | 4 |
| 42 | Hélène Ségara | "Il y a trop de gens qui t'aiment" | 1999 | France | 565,000 | 1 |
| 43 | Ricky Martin | "La Copa de la Vida" | 1998 | Puerto Rico | 563,000 | 1 |
| 44 | Des'ree | "Life" | 1998 | United Kingdom | 555,000 | 2 |
| 45 | Poetic Lover | "Prenons notre temps" | 1997 | France | 532,000 | 5 |
| 46 | Coumba Gawlo | "Pata pata" | 1998 | Senegal | 529,000 | 2 |
| 47 | Indians Sacred Spirit | "Yeha-Noha" | 1995 | Germany | 528,000 | 1 |
| 48 | Lââm | "Jamais loin de toi" | 1999 | France | 518,000 | 5 |
| 49 | Bryan Adams | "(Everything I Do) I Do It for You" | 1991 | Canada | 508,000 | 1 |
| 50 | Céline Dion | "Je sais pas" | 1995 | Canada | 506,000 | 1 |
| 51 | Gala | "Let a Boy Cry" | 1997 | Italy | 497,000 | 1 |
| 52 | Emilia | "Big Big World" | 1999 | Sweden | 496,000 | 2 |
| 53 | Puff Daddy & Faith Evans | "I'll Be Missing You" | 1997 | United States | 492,000 | 2 |
| 54 | Hanson | "MMMBop" | 1997 | United States | 490,000 | 4 |
| 55 | Manau | "Mais qui est la belette ?" | 1999 | France | 490,000 | 1 |
| 56 | The Cranberries | "Zombie" | 1995 | Ireland | 484,000 | 1 |
| 57 | Bellini | "Samba de Janeiro" | 1997 | Germany | 481,000 | 3 |
| 58 | John Scatman | "Scatman (Ski Ba Bop Ba Dop Bop)" | 1995 | United States | 479,000 | 1 |
| 59 | Regg'Lyss | "Mets de l'huile" | 1993 | France | 476,000 | 1 |
| 60 | Janet Jackson | "Together Again" | 1998 | United States | 475,000 | 2 |
| 61 | Modern Talking | "You're My Heart, You're My Soul" | 1998 | Germany | 475,000 | 3 |
| 62 | Johnny Hallyday | "Vivre pour le meilleur" | 1999 | France | 471,000 | 2 |
| 63 | 2Be3 | "Partir un jour" | 1996 | France | 471,000 | 2 |
| 64 | Lara Fabian | "Je t'aime" | 1997 | Belgium | 471,000 | 6 |
| 65 | Madonna | "Frozen" | 1998 | United States | 469,000 | 2 |
| 66 | François Feldman | "Joy" | 1991 | France | 468,000 | 1 |
| 67 | Patrick Bruel | "Qui a le droit... (live)" | 1991 | France | 466,000 | 1 |
| 68 | Youssou N'Dour & Neneh Cherry | "7 Seconds" | 1994 | Senegal; Sweden | 465,000 | 1 |
| 69 | Shania Twain | "Man! I Feel like a Woman!" | 1999 | Canada | 459,000 | 3 |
| 70 | David Charvet | "Should I Leave" | 1997 | France | 452,000 | 3 |
| 71 | Madonna | "Don't Cry for Me Argentina" | 1997 | United States | 447,000 | 1 |
| 72 | Les Inconnus | "Auteuil, Neuilly, Passy" | 1991 | France | 428,000 | 1 |
| 73 | Freddie Mercury | "Living on My Own 1993" | 1993 | United Kingdom | 426,000 | 1 |
| 74 | Mark Snow | "The X-Files" | 1996 | United States | 425,000 | 1 |
| 75 | Pow woW | "Le Chat" | 1992 | France | 423,000 | 1 |
| 76 | Félix Gray & Didier Barbelivien | "Il faut laisser le temps au temps" | 1990 | France | 420,000 | 1 |
| 77 | Felicidad | "Dam dam deo" | 1997 | France | 410,000 | 3 |
| 78 | Britney Spears | "(You Drive Me) Crazy" | 1999 | United States | 409,000 | 2 |
| 79 | Worlds Apart | "Je te donne" | 1996 | United Kingdom | 408,000 | 3 |
| 80 | Barbra Streisand & Céline Dion | "Tell Him" | 1997 | United States; Canada | 400,000 | 4 |
| 81 | G.O. Culture | "Darla_dirladada" | 1993 | France | 397,000 | 1 |
| 82 | Spice Girls | "Spice Up Your Life" | 1997 | United Kingdom | 397,000 | 3 |
| 83 | Elton John | "Can You Feel The Love Tonight" | 1994 | United Kingdom | 391,000 | 1 |
| 84 | Enigma | "Sadeness (Part I)" | 1990 | Germany | 385,000 | 1 |
| 85 | Jean-Philippe Audin & Diego Modena | "Song of Ocarina" | 1991 | Argentina; France | 379,000 | 1 |
| 86 | Boris | "Soirée disco" | 1996 | France | 376,000 | 1 |
| 87 | Ricky Martin | "Te Extraño, Te Olvido, Te Amo" | 1997 | Puerto Rico | 373,000 | 4 |
| 88 | Reel 2 Real | "I Like to Move It" | 1994 | Colombia; United States | 367,000 | 1 |
| 89 | Céline Dion | "Un garçon pas comme les autres (Ziggy)" | 1993 | Canada | 365,000 | 2 |
| 90 | Liane Foly | "La vie ne m'apprend rien" | 1999 | France | 364,000 | 3 |
| 91 | Fool's Garden | "Lemon Tree" | 1996 | Germany | 362,000 | 3 |
| 92 | Phénoménal Club | "Il est vraiment phénoménal" | 1997 | France | 359,000 | 7 |
| 93 | Patrick Bruel | "Alors regarde" | 1990 | France | 358,000 | 3 |
| 94 | 2 Unlimited | "No Limit" | 1993 | Belgium; Netherlands | 357,000 | 1 |
| 95 | Alliance Ethnik | "Respect" | 1995 | France | 357,000 | 2 |
| 96 | Nirvana | "Smells Like Teen Spirit" | 1992 | United States | 356,000 | 1 |
| 97 | IAM | "Je danse le Mia" | 1994 | France | 352,000 | 1 |
| 98 | Organiz' | "I Never Knew Love Like This Before" | 1999 | France | 352,000 | 5 |
| 99 | 2Be3 | "Toujours là pour toi" | 1997 | France | 351,000 | 4 |
| 100 | Snap! | "Rhythm Is a Dancer" | 1992 | Germany | 349,000 | 1 |

== See also ==
- List of number-one hits (France)
