= Les Enfoirés (participants) =

List of participants in charity show

Les Enfoirés (French, 'The Tossers' or 'The Bastards') is the name given to the singers and performers in the yearly charity concert for the Restaurants du Cœur (Les Restos du Cœur).

Here is a list of the participating artists, sportsmen and personalities:

== Artists ==
The names of the participants of the Enfoirés concerts are never revealed by the organizers before the concerts.

Artists (singers, actors, ...) who participated in the annual shows Les Restos du Cœur
Artist's name	1986	1989	1992	1993	1994	1995	1996	1997	1998	1999	2000	2001	2002	2003	2004	2005	2006	2007	2008	2009	2010	2011	2012	2013	2014	2015	2016	2017	2018	2019	2020	2021	2022	2023	2024	2025	2026	Number of participations
Ary Abittan																														2019	2020	2021						3
Esther Abrami																																					2026	1
Salvatore Adamo									1998																													1
Kev Adams																																	2021					1
Alizée												2001	2002						2008	2009	2010	2011	2012	2013														8
Amir																												2017	2018	2019		2021	2022	2023			2026	7
Richard Anconina									1998																													1
Anggun										1999																												1
Dan Ar Braz										1999		2001																										1
Fanny Ardant								1997																														1
Tina Arena																	2006	2007	2008	2009		2011			2014													6
Julien Arruti																													2018	2019	2020	2021	2022	2023	2024	2025	2026	9
Jean-Louis Aubert					1994								2002	2003	2004	2005		2007		2009	2010	2011	2012	2013	2014	2015	2016	2017	2018	2019	2020	2021	2022	2023	2024	2025		23
Hugues Aufray										1999																												1
Charles Aznavour					1994					1999																				Died								2
Chimène Badi															2004	2005	2006	2007					2012	2013	2014													7
Laurent Baffie						1995																																1
Josiane Balasko				1993		1995			1998		2000					2005																						5
Axel Bauer													2002	2003	2004	2005	2006																					5
Nathalie Baye	1986						1996											2007																				2
Emmanuelle Béart					1994			1997																														2
Gilbert Bécaud						1995							Died																									2
Monica Bellucci																											2016											1
Bénabar																		2007	2008	2009	2010		2012	2013	2014	2015	2016	2017	2018	2019			2022				2026	14
Amel Bent																	2006	2007	2008	2009	2010	2011	2012	2013	2014	2015	2016	2017	2018	2019	2020	2021	2022	2023		2025	2026	20
Malik Bentalha																														2019	2020							2
Jocelyne Béroard							1996																															1
Richard Berry										1999																												1
Jean-Marie Bigard									1998	1999	2000	2001																										4
Jane Birkin					1994		1996	1997																										2023				4
Black M																											2016				2020	2021						3
Michel Blanc				1993																																		1
Romane Bohringer					1994																																	1
Dany Boon																									2014	2015	2016								2024			4
Tarek Boudali																													2018	2019		2021	2022		2024			5
Isabelle Boulay												2001	2002			2005																						3
Boulevard des Airs																															2020							1
Carole Bouquet							1996																															1
Didier Bourdon																														2019								1
Jean-Claude Brialy												2001							Died																			1
Dany Brillant									1998				2002	2003																								3
Patrick Bruel				1993	1994	1995	1996	1997	1998	1999	2000	2001	2002	2003	2004	2005	2006	2007	2008	2009	2010	2011	2012	2013	2014	2015	2016	2017	2018	2019	2020	2021	2022	2023	2024	2025	2026	34
Carla Bruni						1995		1997										2007														2021		2023				5
Francis Cabrel			1992		1994		1996	1997	1998		2000	2001	2002	2003	2004		2006	2007	2008		2010						2016											15
Calogero															2004	2005	2006	2007																				3
Bernard Campan																														2019								1
Nicolas Canteloup																							2012	2013	2014	2015	2016	2017	2018	2019	2020	2021	2022	2023	2024		2026	14
Eric Cantona									1998																													1
Claudio Capéo																														2019	2020	2021	2022	2023	2024	2025	2026	8
Renaud Capuçon																											2016						2022					2
Laetitia Casta										1999																												1
Caroline Cellier								1997																								Died						1
Alain Chabat				1993		1995				1999																												3
Vincent Chaillet																													2018									1
Alain Chanfort																																				2025	2026	2
Patrick Chesnais																								2013														1
Julien Clerc							1996		1998		2000	2001		2003		2005	2006		2008		2010				2014	2015	2016	2017	2018		2020		2022	2023	2024	2025	2026	20
Richard Cocciante												2001																										1
Marie Colin																																				2025		1
Marius Colucci					1994																																	1
Coluche	1986	Died																																				1
Annie Cordy											2000																					Died						1
Corneille																2005	2006									2015												3
Jean d'Ormesson																											2016		Died									1
François Damiens																											2016											1
Étienne Daho										1999																												1
Gérard Darmon														2003	2004	2005	2006	2007	2008	2009																		7
Dave								1997																														1
Daniela De Jesus Cosio																														2019								1
Gérald de Palmas							1996					2001	2002	2003		2005	2006		2008	2009																		8
Véronic Dicaire																											2016											1
Alain Delon						1995																														Died		1
François-Xavier Demaison																																				2025	2026	2
Yvon Demol																																			2024			1
Catherine Deneuve								1997																														1
Frédéric Diefenthal																			2008																			1
Dieudonné						1995																																1
Céline Dion					1994		1996												2008																			3
Doc Gynéco									1998																													1
Arielle Dombasle														2003																								1
Michel Drucker	1986																																					1
Arnaud Ducret																																	2022	2023	2024	2025		4
Diane Dufresne				1993																																		1
Patrick Dupond									1998			2001																					Died					2
Jacques Dutronc				1993																																		1
Thomas Dutronc																				2009	2010	2011		2013	2014		2016	2017		2019	2020							9
Stephan Eicher									1998																													1
Sofia Essaidi																																		2023	2024	2025	2026	4
Gad Elmaleh														2003	2004									2013														3
Elsa								1997	1998	1999	2000	2001	2002		2004	2005	2006		2008				2012															11
Émile et Images													2002																									1
Lara Fabian									1998			2001				2005																			2024		2026	5
Dominique Farrugia				1993		1995																																2
Faudel												2001																										1
Patrick Fiori										1999	2000	2001	2002	2003	2004	2005	2006	2007	2008	2009	2010	2011	2012	2013	2014	2015	2016	2017	2018	2019	2020	2021	2022	2023	2024	2025	2026	28
Liane Foly				1993		1995				1999	2000	2001	2002	2003	2004	2005	2006	2007		2009	2010	2011	2012		2014	2015	2016	2017	2018	2019	2020							22
Elodie Fontan																													2018	2019	2020	2021	2022	2023	2024	2025	2026	9
Frédéric François										1999																												1
Claire Francisci-Ducret																																		2023				1
Carole Fredericks			1992		1994	1995	1996	1997	1998	1999	2000	2001	Died																									9
Jérémy Frerot																																	2022	2023	2024	2025	2026	5
Mia Frye												2001																										1
Michel Fugain						1995																																1
Charlotte Gainsbourg					1994							2001																										2
France Gall				1993	1994																								Died									2
José Garcia											2000																											1
Pierre Garnier																																				2025		1
Garou										1999	2000	2001	2002	2003	2004	2005	2006	2007	2008	2009	2010		2012	2013			2016	2017					2022	2023				18
Coumba Gawlo										1999																												1
Jean-Marc Généreux																								2013														1
Marie-Agnès Gillot																											2016	2017	2018	2019	2020	2021	2022	2023	2024			9
Kendji Girac																											2016	2017	2018	2019	2020		2022	2023	2024	2025		9
Jean-Jacques Goldman	1986	1989	1992	1993	1994	1995	1996	1997	1998	1999	2000	2001	2002	2003	2004	2005	2006	2007	2008	2009	2010	2011	2012	2013	2014	2015	2016											27
Grégoire																					2010	2011	2012	2013	2014	2015	2016	2017										8
David Hallyday										1999	2000	2001	2002	2003				2007	2008	2009								2017										9
Johnny Hallyday		1989						1997	1998																				Died									3
Helena																																					2026	1
Renaud Hantson				1993																																		1
Les Innocents							1996	1997																														2
Tibo InShape																																					2026	1
Jain																																				2025	2026	2
Jarry																																					2026	1
Jenifer														2003	2004	2005	2006	2007	2008	2009	2010	2011	2012	2013		2015	2016	2017	2018	2019	2020			2023	2024	2025	2026	21
Joyce Jonathan																																	2022	2023	2024	2025		4
Michael Jones		1989	1992	1993	1994		1996	1997		1999		2001	2002		2004	2005	2006	2007	2008	2009	2010	2011	2012	2013	2014	2015	2016	2017	2018	2019	2020	2021						27
Camélia Jordana																																	2022					1
Gérard Jugnot									1998	1999		2001	2002		2004	2005			2008		2010	2011	2012	2013		2015	2016	2017			2020		2022			2025	2026	18
Patrick Juvet									1998																								Died					1
Patricia Kaas			1992	1993		1995		1997	1998	1999	2000	2001	2002	2003	2004		2006	2007			2010	2011																15
Élie Kakou				1993		1995					Died																											2
Joseph Kamel																																				2025	2026	2
Claire Keim																2005	2006	2007	2008	2009	2010	2011	2012	2013	2014	2015	2016	2017	2018	2019	2020	2021		2023	2024	2025	2026	21
Khaled							1996			1999																												2
Sandrine Kiberlain								1997		1999		2001			2004		2006										2016											6
Peter Kingsbery				1993																																		1
Lââm											2000	2001	2002	2003	2004	2005	2006	2007	2008	2009	2010	2011	2012		2014	2015												15
Philippe Lacheau																												2017	2018	2019	2020	2021	2022	2023	2024	2025	2026	10
Serge Lama										1999	2000		2002									2011																4
Martin Lamotte										1999																												1
Alain Lanty				1993			1996			1999																												3
Catherine Lara					1994				1998				2002	2003	2004	2005	2006		2008	2009	2010		2012										2022					12
Michèle Laroque								1997	1998	1999	2000	2001	2002		2004	2005	2006		2008	2009	2010	2011		2013	2014	2015	2016	2017	2018	2019	2020	2021		2023	2024	2025	2026	26
Chantal Lauby				1993		1995																																2
Philippe Lavil							1996	1997	1998																													3
Marc Lavoine							1996	1997	1998	1999	2000	2001	2002	2003	2004	2005	2006		2008						2014		2016		2018									15
Philippine Lavrey																															2020	2021	2022	2023	2024	2025		6
Yves Lecoq							1996	1997	1998	1999	2000					2005																						6
Michel Leeb							1996																															1
Estelle Lefébure														2003																								1
Pauline Lefèvre																														2019								1
Maxime Le Forestier						1995		1997	1998	1999	2000	2001	2002	2003	2004	2005	2006	2007	2008	2009	2010	2011	2012	2013	2014	2015	2016	2017										22
Pascal Légitimus																														2019								1
Valérie Lemercier				1993	1994																																	2
Nolwenn Leroy																	2006	2007	2008	2009	2010	2011	2012	2013	2014		2016	2017		2019	2020	2021	2022	2023	2024	2025	2026	19
Daniel Lévi												2001																										1
Thierry Lhermitte							1996	1997	1998			2001																										4
Lorie													2002	2003	2004	2005	2006	2007	2008	2009	2010	2011	2012	2013	2014	2015	2016	2017	2018	2019		2021	2022	2023		2025	2026	23
Louane																											2016											1
Germain Louvet																																		2023	2024			2
Renan Luce																				2009	2010	2011	2012	2013														5
Fabrice Luchini										1999													2012															2
Alex Lutz																																				2025	2026	2
Mireille Mathieu									1998																													1
Christophe Maé																			2008	2009	2010	2011	2012	2013	2014		2016	2017	2018		2020	2021		2023		2025	2026	15
Maëlle																															2020							1
Ibrahim Maalouf																																				2025		1
Sophie Marceau																											2016											1
Marine																																					2026	1
Mimie Mathy					1994	1995	1996	1997	1998	1999	2000	2001		2003	2004	2005	2006	2007	2008	2009	2010	2011	2012	2013	2014	2015	2016	2017	2018	2019	2020	2021		2023		2025		28
Jean-Baptiste Maunier																2005	2006	2007	2008		2010	2011	2012	2013	2014	2015	2016	2017		2019	2020				2024	2025	2026	17
Maurane							1996			1999	2000	2001	2002	2003	2004	2005	2006		2008	2009	2010	2011		2013						Died								14
McFly et Carlito																																					2026	1
MC Solaar								1997				2001	2002	2003	2004	2005	2006	2007	2008	2009	2010	2011	2012	2013	2014	2015	2016	2017	2018	2019	2020		2022			2025	2026	24
Mentissa																																		2023	2024		2026	3
Mika																								2013														1
Kad Merad																		2007	2008	2009	2010	2011	2012		2014	2015	2016	2017	2018	2019	2020	2021		2023	2024	2025		15
Jean-Jacques Milteau			1992		1994																																	2
Eddy Mitchell		1989			1994	1995																																3
Emmanuel Moire																									2014	2015	2016											2
Yves Montand	1986		Died																																			1
Marc Moreau																																			2024			1
Nana Mouskouri								1997																														1
Karen Mulder							1996		1998	1999	2000	2001				2005	2006	2007	2008																			9
I Muvrini								1997																														1
Claire Nadeau				1993																																		1
Nâdiya																		2007																				1
Native									1998	1999																												2
Isabelle Nanty																														2019	2020	2021	2022	2023		2025		6
Khadja Nin								1997																														1
Yannick Noah				1993			1996		1998				2002	2003	2004	2005	2006	2007				2011	2012															11
Pascal Obispo								1997	1998	1999	2000	2001	2002			2005			2008	2009	2010	2011	2012	2013	2014	2015	2016											16
Ofenbach																																	2022					1
Florent Pagny				1993	1994	1995							2002														2016			2019		2021					2026	7
Pierre Palmade				1993	1994	1995	1996	1997	1998	1999	2000	2001	2002	2003	2004	2005	2006	2007	2008	2009				2013		2015	2016				2020	2021						21
Jeff Panacloc																											2016	2017										2
Vanessa Paradis				1993	1994	1995	1996	1997	1998	1999		2001															2016											8
Paul Personne					1994																																	1
Thomas Pesquet																												2017					2022	2023		2025		4
Luc Plamondon				1993																																		1
M. Pokora																							2012	2013	2014	2015	2016	2017							2024	2025	2026	9
Alice Pol																															2020	2021	2022	2023				4
Pow Wow					1994			1997																														2
Princess Erika							1996	1997																														2
Raphaël																	2006	2007		2009															2024	2025	2026	6
Rébecca																																2021						1
Axelle Red									1998		2000																											2
Inès Reg																															2020	2021		2023				3
Serge Reggiani						1995										Died																						1
Renaud			1992		1994	1995			1998	1999					2004																							6
Jean Reno							1996																															1
Dick Rivers										1999																					Died							1
Muriel Robin			1992	1993	1994	1995	1996	1997	1998	1999	2000	2001	2002	2003	2004	2005	2006	2007													2020							17
Gaëtan Roussel																																			2024	2025	2026	3
Axelle Saint-Cirel																																				2025	2026	2
Véronique Sanson		1989				1995	1996	1997		1999																					2020							6
Santa																																			2024	2025	2026	3
Michel Sardou		1989							1998						2004	2005																						4
Patrick Sébastien			1992																																			1
Hélène Ségara										1999	2000	2001	2002		2004	2005	2006	2007	2008	2009	2010	2011	2012	2013	2014	2015												16
Élie Semoun									1998	1999																								2023				3
Shy'm																							2012	2013	2014		2016									2025	2026	6
Anne Sila																																	2022	2023	2024			3
Yves Simon								1997	1998																													2
Slimane																														2019	2020	2021		2023	2024			5
Smaïn			1992			1995		1997	1998																													4
Soprano																											2016	2017	2018	2019	2020	2021	2022	2023	2024	2025	2026	11
Natasha St-Pier														2003	2004	2005	2006	2007		2009	2010	2011		2013	2014	2015												11
Styleto																																					2026	1
Alain Souchon					1994	1995	1996	1997	1998	1999	2000			2003													2016											9
Claudia Tagbo																																			2024	2025	2026	3
Alice Taglioni																																2021						1
Tal																								2013	2014	2015	2016	2017	2018	2019								7
Patrick Timsit							1996	1997	1998	1999	2000	2001	2002	2003		2005	2006				2010						2016											11
Titoff													2002																									1
Tonton David				1993																													Died					1
Arnaud Toupense																																				2025		1
Jacques Veneruso							1996																															1
Vianney																																2021	2022	2023	2024	2025	2026	6
Vitaa																															2020	2021		2023	2024	2025	2026	6
Roch Voisine								1997		1999	2000	2001	2002			2005																						6
Laurent Voulzy					1994	1995		1997	1998				2002																									5
Éric Vu-An			1992																																			1
Christophe Willem																			2008	2009	2010	2011		2013	2014	2015	2016	2017	2018	2019	2020	2021		2023	2024		2026	16
Ophélie Winter							1996			1999	2000			2003		2005																						5
Ycare																																			2024	2025	2026	3
Michaël Youn																									2014	2015	2016	2017	2018		2020	2021			2024	2025	2026	10
Zaz																						2011	2012	2013	2014	2015	2016		2018			2021		2023	2024		2026	11
Zazie								1997	1998	1999	2000	2001	2002	2003	2004	2005	2006	2007	2008	2009	2010	2011	2012	2013	2014	2015	2016	2017	2018	2019	2020	2021	2022	2023	2024	2025	2026	30
Julie Zenatti														2003	2004	2005	2006	2007	2008	2009																		7
Number of artists	5	6	11	24	29	29	32	42	45	50	35	44	37	35	36	45	42	36	40	37	37	35	36	40	39	35	55	35	33	39	42	40	32	44	44	50	52	248 various artists

== Sportspeople ==
Sportspeople who participated in the shows Restos du Cœur
Name	1986	1995	1998	1999	2000	2001	2002	2006	2009	2011	2012	2013	2014	2016	2017	2018	2019	2020	2021	2022	2023	2024	2025	2026
Yannick Agnel												2013												
Fabien Barthez				1999																				
Karim Benzema											2012													
Alain Bernard										2011														
Laurent Blanc										2011														
Alain Boghossian				1999																				
Basile Boli		1995																						
Eric Cantona			1998																					
Sébastien Chabal									2009					2016	2017	2018	2019	2020	2021	2022|	2023	2024	2025	2026
Grégory Coupet								2006																
Ousmane Dembélé																								2026
Pauline Déroulède																				2022				
Didier Deschamps													2014				2019							
David Douillet						2001																		
Christophe Dugarry					2000																			
Antoine Dupont																					2023	2024	2025	
Tony Estanguet																							2025	
Fabien Gilot										2011														
Bafétimbi Gomis											2012													
Amandine Henry																		2020						
Zlatan Ibrahimović														2016										
Aimé Jacquet						2001																		
Christian Karembeu				1999																				
Camille Lacourt										2011														
Frank Lebœuf							2002																	
Alexis Lebrun																							2025	
Felix Lebrun																							2025	
Amaury Leveaux										2011														
Bixente Lizarazu				1999			2002																	
Sébastien Loeb										2011														
Kylian Mbappé																	2019			2022				
Esteban Ocon																					2023	2024		
Tony Parker																		2020						
Emmanuel Petit				1999																				
Michel Platini	1986																							
Franck Ribéry									2009															
Guy Roux						2001																		
Lilian Thuram				1999																				
Zinedine Zidane						2001																		

== Regular participants ==
List of artists and other notable people who participated 10 times or more in the annual shows Les Restos du Cœur

Artist	Number of contributions	Years participated
Patrick Bruel	34	1993–2026
Zazie	30	1997–2026
Patrick Fiori	28	1999–2026
Mimie Mathy	28	1994–2001, 2003–2016, 2018–2021, 2023, 2025
Jean-Jacques Goldman	27	1986, 1989, 1992–2016
Michael Jones	27	1989–1994, 1996–1997, 1999, 2001–2002, 2004–2021
Michèle Laroque	26	1997–2002, 2004–2006, 2008–2011, 2013–2018, 2020-2021, 2023-2026
MC Solaar	24	1997, 2001–2020, 2022, 2025-2026
Jean-Louis Aubert	23	1994, 2002–2005, 2007, 2009–2025
Lorie	23	2002–2019, 2020-2023, 2025-2026
Liane Foly	22	1993, 1995, 1999–2007, 2009–2012, 2014–2020
Maxime Le Forestier	22	1995, 1997–2017
Pierre Palmade	20	1993–2009, 2013, 2015–2016, 2020
Jenifer	21	2003-2013, 2015-2020, 2023-2026
Claire Keim	21	2005–2021, 2023-2026
Amel Bent	20	2006–2023, 2025-2026
Julien Clerc	20	1996, 1998, 2000–2001, 2003, 2005–2006, 2008, 2010, 2014–2018, 2020, 2022-2026
Nolwenn Leroy	19	2006–2014, 2016–2017, 2019–2026
Garou	18	1999–2010, 2012–2013, 2016–2017, 2022-2023
Gérard Jugnot	18	1998–1999, 2001–2002, 2004–2005, 2008, 2010–2013, 2015, 2017, 2020, 2022, 2025-2026
Kad Merad	18	2007–2012, 2014–2025
Muriel Robin	17	1992-2007, 2020
Jean-Baptiste Maunier	17	2005–2008, 2010–2017, 2019–2020, 2024-2026
Pascal Obispo	16	1997–2002, 2005, 2008–2016
Hélène Ségara	16	1999–2002, 2004–2015
Christophe Willem	16	2008–2011, 2013–2021, 2023-2024, 2026
Francis Cabrel	15	1992, 1994, 1996–1998, 2000–2004, 2006–2008, 2010, 2016
Patricia Kaas	15	1992–1993, 1995, 1997–2004, 2006–2007, 2010–2011
Lââm	15	2000–2012. 2014–2015
Marc Lavoine	15	1996–2006, 2008, 2014, 2016, 2018
Christophe Maé	15	2008–2014, 2016–2018, 2020-2021, 2023, 2025-2026
Maurane	14	1996, 1999–2006, 2008–2011, 2013
Bénabar	14	2007–2010, 2012–2014, 2016–2019, 2022-2023, 2026
Nicolas Canteloup	14	2012–204, 2026
Patrick Timsit	13	1994, 1996–2003, 2005–2006, 2010, 2012
Sébastien Chabal	12	2009, 2016-2026
Yannick Noah	11	1993, 1996, 1998, 2002–2007, 2011–2012
Catherine Lara	11	1994, 1998, 2002–2006, 2008–2010, 2012
Elsa	11	1997–2002, 2004–2006, 2008, 2012
Natasha St-Pier	11	2003–2007, 2009–2011, 2013–2015
Zaz	11	2011–2016, 2018, 2021, 2023-2024, 2026
Soprano	11	2016-2026
Vanessa Paradis	10	1993-1999, 2001, 2016, 2022
Michaël Youn	10	2014-2018, 2020-2021, 2024-2026
Philippe Lacheau	10	2017-2026
