= La Caravane des Enfoirés =

Studio album by Les Enfoirés
- Released: 2007
- Recorded: Nantes, France; 27 January 2007
- Genre: Pop
- Label: Universal Music

Les Enfoirés chronology
Le Village des Enfoirés (2006)	La Caravane des Enfoirés (2007)	Les Secrets des Enfoirés (2008)

Singles from La Caravane des Enfoirés
- 1. "Aimer à perdre la raison" Released: March 2007

La Caravane des Enfoirés is an album performed by Les Enfoirés, released in 2007. It was recorded during the show at Le Zénith in Nantes, on 27 January 2007.

== Track listing ==
=== Disc 1 ===
1. "Le brio (branchez la guitare)" (Kelleth Chinn / Caroline Wampole) with Tina Arena and Karen Mulder.
2. "Est-ce que tu me suis?" (Jean-Jacques Goldman) with Chimène Badi, Patrick Bruel, Francis Cabrel, Patrick Fiori, Liane Foly, Garou, Jean-Jacques Goldman, Jenifer, Patricia Kaas, Maxime Le Forestier and Nolwenn Leroy.
3. "Mourir demain" (Lionel Florence / Asdorve) with Jenifer, Patricia Kaas, Jean-Baptiste Maunier and Yannick Noah
4. "Je t'emmène au vent" (Gaëtan Roussel / Louise Attaque) with Chimène Badi, Garou, Nolwenn Leroy, Lorie and Pierre Palmade
5. "Le cœur trop grand pour moi" (Jean-Loup Dabadie / Julien Clerc) with Jean-Louis Aubert, Patrick Bruel, Nâdiya, Yannick Noah
6. "Si seulement je pouvais lui manquer" (Julie d'Aime - Michel Jourdan / Calogero - Gioacchino Maurici) with Amel Bent, Francis Cabrel, Jean-Jacques Goldman and Raphaël
7. "Être à la hauteur" (Lionel Florence - Patrice Guirao / Xavier Pace - Cyril Paulus) with Chimène Badi, Patrick Fiori, Liane Foly, Patricia Kaas and Natasha St-Pier
8. "(Everything I do) I Do It for You" (Bryan Adams / Michael Kamen - Robert Lange) with Tina Arena, Amel Bent, David Hallyday and Hélène Ségara
9. "Rodéo" (Zazie / Philippe Paradis - Jean-Pierre Pilot - Zazie) with Jean-Louis Aubert, Patrick Bruel, Francis Cabrel and Garou
10. "Jeune Demoiselle" (Diam's / Diam's - Michel Fleurent - Yann Lemen - Luc Ollivier) with Jenifer, Yannick Noah, MC Solaar and Zazie
11. "La voix des sages (no more fighting)" (J. Kapler) with Maxime Le forestier, Jean-Baptiste Maunier, Nâdiya, Yannick Noah and Natasha St-Pier
12. "C'est de l'eau, c'est du vent" (Pierre Delanoë / Alice Dona) with Bénabar, Gérard Darmon, Claire Keim and Hélène Ségara
13. "I Love Rock'n Roll" (Jake Hooker - Alan Merrill) with Garou, Lââm, Lorie and Karen Mulder
14. "Le baiser" (Alain Souchon) with Gérard Darmon, Jean-Jacques Goldman, Claire Keim and Muriel Robin
15. "Le temps des fleurs" (Eddy Marnay / Musique traditionelle russe) with Bénabar, Liane Foly, Nolwenn Leroy, Karen Mulder and Julie Zénatti
16. "Dis quand reviendras-tu?" (Barbara) with Patrick Bruel, Carla Bruni, Raphaël and Zazie
17. "Et dans 150 ans" (Raphaël) with Jean-Louis Aubert, Patrick Bruel, Patrick Fiori, David Hallyday, Patricia Kaas, Lââm, Maxime Le Forestier, Pierre Palmade, Muriel Robin, Zazie, Julie Zénatti
18. "Aimer à perdre la raison" (Louis Aragon / Jean Ferrat) with Tina Arena, Jean-Louis Aubert, Bénabar, Francis Cabrel, Claire Keim, Lââm, Nâdiya, Yannick Noah, Raphaël
19. "La chanson des Restos (Jean-Jacques Goldman) with Tina Arena, Jean-Louis Aubert, Chimène Badi, Bénabar, Amel Bent, Patrick Bruel, Carla Bruni, Francis Cabrel, Gérard Darmon, Patrick Fiori, Liane Foly, Garou, Jean-Jacques Goldman, David Hallyday, Jenifer, Michael Jones, Patricia Kaas, Claire Keim, Lââm, Maxime Le Forestier, Nolwenn Leroy, Lorie, Jean-Baptiste Maunier, Kad Merad, Karen Mulder, Nâdiya, Yannick Noah, Pierre Palmade, Raphaël, Muriel Robin, Hélène Ségara, MC Solaar, Natasha St-Pier, Zazie, Julie Zénatti

=== Disc 2 ===
1. "Medley Animaux" ("Le Chat" (Pow woW) with Garou and Jean-Jacques Goldman; La mouche (Michel Polnareff) with Nolwenn Leroy and MC Solaar; "Le lion est mort ce soir" (Luigi Creatore - Hugo Peretti / George David Weiss) with Francis Cabrel and Hélène Ségara; Biche, ô ma biche (Doc Pomus / Mort Shuman) with Lorie and Pierre Palmade; "Stewball" (John Herald - Ralph Rinzler - Bob Yellin) with Patricia Kaas and Julie Zénatti; "Tout l'or des hommes" (Jacques Vénéruso) with Chimène Badi and Natasha St-Pier)
2. "Medley Miss Restos" ("J'traîne des pieds" (Olivia Ruiz / Benjamin Ricour) with Jenifer; "Je ne veux pas rentrer chez moi seule" (Agathe Labérnia / Gilles Ganidel - Frédéric Schlessiger) with Gérard Darmon, Liane Foly, David Hallyday and Jenifer; "Mini, Mini, Mini" (Jacques Lanzmann / Jacques Dutronc) with Zazie; "Elle, tu l'aimes..." (Frederico Brito - Francisco Trindate) with Jenifer, Claire Keim and Zazie; "La bonne du curé" (Charles Level / Tont Montoya - Tony Reval) with Karen Mulder; "Belles, belles, belles" (Phil Everly) with Patrick Bruel, Gérard Darmon and David Hallyday)
3. "Medley Camps de gitans" ("Sous le vent" (Jacques Vénéruso) with Yannick Noah and Zazie; "Tous les bateaux, tous les oiseaux" (Jean-Loup Dabadie / Paul de Senneville) with Jean-Louis Aubert and Hélène Ségara; "La pêche à la ligne" (Renaud / Jean-Pierre Bucolo) with Garou and Maxime Le Forestier; "Le pont de Nantes" (chanson traditionelle / Guy Béart) with MC Solaar; "Le grand sommeil" (Etienne Daho) with Lââm and Pierre Palmade; "Sur la route" (Raphaël / Raphaël - Jean-Louis Aubert) with Bénabar and Carla Bruni; "Des ronds dans l'eau" (Pierre Barouth / Raymond Le Sénéchal) with Francis Cabrel and Raphaël; "Adieu jolie Candy" (Alain Boublil / Raymond Jeannot) with Michael Jones and Kad Merad; "Les amoureux des bancs publics" (Georges Brassens) with Amel Bent and Patrick Fiori; "Alter égo" (Jean-Louis Aubert) with Liane Foly and Nâdiya; "J'veux du soleil" (Jamel Laroussi) with Jean-Louis Aubert, David Hallyday, Lorie, Yannick Noah, Hélène Ségara and Zazie)
4. "Medley Johnny" ("Johnny, Johnny" (Jeanne Mas / Romano Musumara) with Tina Arena, Jenifer, Lââm and Muriel Robin; "Je suis né dans la rue" (Thomas Brown - Mike Jones / Long Chris) with Gérard Darmon; "J'ai un problème" (Michel Mallory / Jean Renard) with Yannick Noah; "Ma gueule" (Pierre Nacabal / Philippe Bretonniere) with Garou; "Marie" (Gérald De Palmas) with Michael Jones)
5. "Medley Jeu des Enfoirés" ("Vancouver" (Véronique Sanson) with Maxime Le Forestier; "Long Is the Road (Américain)" (Jean-Jacques Goldman) with Chimène Badi; "Qui de nous deux?" (Michel Daudin / Matthieu Chedid - Sébastien Martel) with Patrick Fiori; "Amoureux de ma femme" (Luciano Beretta - Miki Del Prete / Daniele Pace - Mario Panzeri) with Bénabar; "Allô maman bobo" (Alain Souchon / Laurent Voulzy) with Jean-Jacques Goldman; "Dans l'eau de la claire fontaine" (Georges Brassens) with Muriel Robin; "Bravo, tu as gagné" (Benny Andersson - Björn Ulvaeus) with Claire Keim and Kad Merad)
6. "Medley Double" ("Elle" with Patrick Bruel and Muriel Robin; "Il" with Patrick Bruel and Muriel Robin; "Toi, mon amour" with Jean-Jacques Goldman and Natasha St-Pier; "Laura" with Maxime Le Forestier; "Ballade de Jim" with Maxime Le Forestier and Nâdiya; "Poupée de cire, poupée de son" with Gérard Darmon and Lorie; "Je suis un homme" with Gérard Darmon and Lorie; "La chanson de Ziggy" with Tina Arena and Bénabar; "Ma môme" with Bénabar; "Je fais de toi mon essentiel" with David Hallyday and Karen Mulder)
7. "Medley Tubes de l'été" ("Hung up" with Francis Cabrel and Patricia Kaas; "La camisa negra" with Jenifer and MC Solaar; "Mon Pays" with Claire Keim and Julie Zénatti; "Crazy" with Amel Bent and Yannick Noah; "Zidane y va marquer" with Francis Cabrel, Jenifer, Jean-Baptiste Maunier, Yannick Noah and Pierre Palmade; "Baila morena" with Patrick Fiori and Hélène Ségara; "Derniers baisers" with Francis Cabrel, Gérard Darmon, Jenifer, Karen Mulder and Hélène Ségara)
8. "Aimer à perdre la raison" (version studio) with Tina Arena, Jean-Louis Aubert, Chimène Badi, Bénabar, Amel Bent, Patrick Bruel, Carla Bruni, Francis Cabrel, Gérard Darmon, Patrick Fiori, Liane Foly, Garou, Jean-Jacques Goldman, David Hallyday, Jenifer, Michael Jones, Patricia Kaas, Claire Keim, Lââm, Maxime Le Forestier, Nolwenn Leroy, Lorie, Jean-Baptiste Maunier, Kad Merad, Karen Mulder, Nâdiya, Yannick Noah, Pierre Palmade, Raphaël, Muriel Robin, Hélène Ségara, MC Solaar, Natasha St-Pier, Zazie, Julie Zénatti)

== Certifications and sales ==
Country	Certification	Date	Sales certified
Belgium	Platinum	March 24, 2007	40,000
France	3 x Platinum	April 26, 2007	600,000
Switzerland	Gold	2007	10,000

== Charts ==
Chart (2007)	Peak position
Belgian (Wallonia) Albums Chart	1
French SNEP Albums Chart	1
Swiss Albums Chart	2

Year-end chart (2007)	Position
Belgian (Wallonia) Albums Chart	1
French Albums Chart	5
Swiss Albums Chart	29
