= List of number-one singles of 1992 (France) =

This is a list of the French SNEP Top 100 Singles number-ones of 1992.

== Summary ==
=== Singles Chart ===
Week	Issue Date	Artist	Single
1	January 4	Patrick Bruel	"Qui a le droit..."
2	January 11	Patrick Bruel	"Qui a le droit..."
3	January 18	Jean-Philippe Audin and Diego Modena	"Song of Ocarina"
4	January 25	Michael Jackson	"Black or White"
5	February 1	Michael Jackson	"Black or White"
6	February 8	Jean-Philippe Audin and Diego Modena	"Song of Ocarina"
7	February 15	Patrick Bruel	"Qui a le droit..."
8	February 22	George Michael and Elton John	"Don't Let the Sun Go Down on Me"
9	February 29	George Michael and Elton John	"Don't Let the Sun Go Down on Me"
10	March 7	George Michael and Elton John	"Don't Let the Sun Go Down on Me"
11	March 14	George Michael and Elton John	"Don't Let the Sun Go Down on Me"
12	March 21	George Michael and Elton John	"Don't Let the Sun Go Down on Me"
13	March 28	George Michael and Elton John	"Don't Let the Sun Go Down on Me"
14	April 4	George Michael and Elton John	"Don't Let the Sun Go Down on Me"
15	April 11	Ten Sharp	"You"
16	April 18	Ten Sharp	"You"
17	April 25	François Feldman	"Joy"
18	May 2	François Feldman	"Joy"
19	May 9	François Feldman	"Joy"
20	May 16	François Feldman	"Joy"
21	May 23	François Feldman	"Joy"
22	May 30	François Feldman	"Joy"
23	June 6	François Feldman	"Joy"
24	June 13	François Feldman	"Joy"
25	June 20	Nirvana	"Smells Like Teen Spirit"
26	June 27	Nirvana	"Smells Like Teen Spirit"
27	July 4	Nirvana	"Smells Like Teen Spirit"
28	July 11	Nirvana	"Smells Like Teen Spirit"
29	July 18	Pow woW	"Le Chat"
30	July 25	Pow woW	"Le Chat"
31	August 1	Pow woW	"Le Chat"
32	August 8	Pow woW	"Le Chat"
33	August 15	Pow woW	"Le Chat"
34	August 22	Pow woW	"Le Chat"
35	August 29	Pow woW	"Le Chat"
36	September 5	Snap!	"Rhythm Is a Dancer"
37	September 12	Snap!	"Rhythm Is a Dancer"
38	September 19	Snap!	"Rhythm Is a Dancer"
39	September 26	Snap!	"Rhythm Is a Dancer"
40	October 3	Snap!	"Rhythm Is a Dancer"
41	October 10	Snap!	"Rhythm Is a Dancer"
42	October 17	Jordy	"Dur dur d'être bébé!"
43	October 24	Jordy	"Dur dur d'être bébé!"
44	October 31	Jordy	"Dur dur d'être bébé!"
45	November 7	Jordy	"Dur dur d'être bébé!"
46	November 14	Jordy	"Dur dur d'être bébé!"
47	November 21	Jordy	"Dur dur d'être bébé!"
48	November 28	Jordy	"Dur dur d'être bébé!"
49	December 5	Jordy	"Dur dur d'être bébé!"
50	December 12	Jordy	"Dur dur d'être bébé!"
51	December 19	Jordy	"Dur dur d'être bébé!"
52	December 26	Jordy	"Dur dur d'être bébé!"

== See also ==
- 1992 in music
- List of number-one singles in France
- List of artists who reached number one on the French Singles Chart
