= Zidane y va marquer =

Single by Cauet
- B-side: "Long version"
- Released: July 6, 2006
- Recorded: France, 2006
- Genre: Parody
- Length: 2:34
- Label: Universal Music, Be Aware
- Songwriters: Salif Keita; Martin Solveig; Cauet; Jean-Pierre Dannic

Cauet singles chronology
"T'es radio star" (2005)	"Zidane y va marquer" (2006)

"Zidane y va marquer" is a song recorded by the French TV and radio host Sébastien Cauet, released July 3, 2006. Based on the music of Salif Keita and Martin Solveig's hit single "Madan", this parody refers to Zinedine Zidane and other players of the French football team competing in the 2006 FIFA World Cup.

== Background and writing ==
From May 2006, the song featured on the radio program hosted by Cauet every morning. The tone is humorous and refers to Zidane as a providential savior. The lyrics also mentioned the non-selection of Jérôme Rothen and Nicolas Anelka and the unexpected selection of Pascal Chimbonda. In the original version, Zidane was injured leaving the place to Claude Makélélé, but after the match between France and China, the lyrics were changed to reflect Djibril Cissé's real life injury.

The song gained in popularity with the victories of the France national football team at the World Cup, being sung in the streets during the after games celebrations. Thereafter, Cauet decided to record the song as a single, which was published by Universal Music. The refrain featured in advertising jingles on TF1 before matches. The lyrics were changed in order to allow the release of the song (for example, the line mentioning Sony's PlayStation Portable was deleted).

The music video was shot only a few days before the final match of the World Cup: devoted to karaoke, it shows Cauet's entire team of hosts singing the song in the streets. Even though France didn't win, Zidane, after having rammed his head into Marco Materazzi's chest and his expulsion, revived the song. Therefore, "Zidane y va marquer" became a hit in France.

== Cover versions ==
The same day, the group La Plage immediately covered the song re-entitled "Coup de Boule" and dealing with the aggression of Zidane. Composed in a few hours and quickly leaked on the Internet, it also became a hit and reached number 1 on the French and Belgian Singles Charts.

In 2007, Les Enfoirés recorded a medley of summer hits, including "Zidane y va marquer", performed by Jean-Baptiste Maunier and Pierre Palmade and available on the 2007 album La Caravane des Enfoirés.

At the Rugby World Cup of 2007, Cauet adapted and sang the song re-entitled "Chabal va les manger" by modifying the lyrics.

== Footballers mentioned in the song ==
In order of mention:

- Zinedine Zidane
- Vikash Dhorasoo
- Sylvain Wiltord
- Claude Makélélé
- William Gallas
- Florent Malouda
- Grégory Coupet
- Patrick Vieira
- Jérôme Rothen
- Pascal Chimbonda
- Franck Ribéry
- Nicolas Anelka
- Djibril Cissé

== Track listings ==
CD single

1. "Zidane y va marquer" — 2:34
2. "Zidane y va marquer" (long version) — 4:17

Digital download

1. "Zidane y va marquer" — 2:34

== Certifications and sales ==
Country	Certification	Date	Sales certified	Physical sales
France	Should be Silver	—	—	181,119

== Charts ==
Chart (2006)	Peak position
Belgian (Wallonia) Singles Chart	13
French Digital Chart	2
French SNEP Singles Chart	1
Swiss Singles Chart	13

End of year chart (2006)	Position
Belgian (Wallonia) Singles Chart	71
French Singles Chart	17
