= Petit Frank =

1990 single by François Feldman

Single by François Feldman

from the album Une Présence
- B-side: "Encore plus belle endormie"; "Fragile Queen" (CD maxi)
- Released: 6 October 1990
- Recorded: France, 1989
- Genre: Pop
- Length: 3:50
- Label: Phonogram
- Songwriters: François Feldman; Jean-Marie Moreau
- Producer: Jean Fredenucci

François Feldman singles chronology
"C'est toi qui m'as fait" (1990)	"Petit Frank" (1990)	"J'ai peur" (1991)

"Petit Frank" is a 1989 song recorded by the French singer and songwriter François Feldman. It was the fourth single from his 1989 album, Une Présence, and was released on 6 October 1990. As for the previous three singles from the album, "Joue pas", "Les Valses de Vienne" and "C'est toi qui m'as fait", it had a great success in France, reaching the top of the SNEP chart, thus becoming Feldman's second number one hit. Later, it was included on Feldman's three best of compilations, Two Feldman (1996), Best Feldman (1998) and Gold (2008); it was also performed during Feldman's 1991 tour and was thus included on the live album Feldman à Bercy (1992).

== Composition and music video ==
As for the previous singles from the album Une Présence, "Petit Frank" was written by Jean-Marie Moreau, while the music was composed by François Feldman himself. According to Elia Habib, an expert of French charts, the song enjoys a "genuine sensitivity" and its "main character is a boy, abandoned or orphaned, presumably placed at the Assistance publique - Hôpitaux de Paris, faltering between combativeness and vulnerability". Lyrically, "Petit Frank" deals with the suffering of the child who tries to be courageous despite his mother's death when he was ten, as said in the refrain. The black and white music video illustrating the song shows the young boy Frank, played by French actor Boris Roatta, tormented by his schoolmates who do not understand his suffering. In an interview, Feldman stated that the song is not autobiographical or personal at all, as he deemed his childhood as very happy and pampered.

== Chart performance ==
In France, the single debuted at number 39 on the chart edition of 6 October 1990, then climbed straight to the top twenty and entered the top ten in its fourth week. It hit number two from its eighth week, but remained blocked for five weeks by Mecano's smash hit "Une Femme avec une femme" which topped the chart then, then peaked at number one for three consecutive weeks. It totalled 16 weeks in the top ten and 22 weeks on the top 50. Although not certified by the Syndicat National de l'Édition Phonographique, its sales exceeded 500,000 copies. With his singles "Les Valses de Vienne" and "Petit Frank", Feldman became the first and the last artist who reached the number one position on the SNEP chart in 1990, thus becoming the first French artist to obtain two number one hit singles on a year in the country.

On the European Hot 100, "Petit Frank" entered at number 81 on 27 October 1990, peaked at number 11 in its 13th week, then dropped quickly and totalled 18 weeks on the chart.

== Track listings ==
- 7" single
1. "Petit Frank" — 3:50
2. "Encore plus belle endormie" — 3:03
- 7" maxi
1. "Petit Frank" (extended version) — 4:58
2. "Encore plus belle endormie" — 3:03
3. "Petit Frank" — 3:50
- CD maxi
1. "Petit Franck" (extended version) — 4:58
2. "Encore plus belle endormie" (Live 90) — 3:03
3. "Fragile Queen" — 6:02
4. "Petit Franck" (new version) — 3:50

== Charts ==
=== Weekly charts ===
Weekly chart performance for "Petit Frank"
Chart (1990–1991)	Peak position
Europe (Eurochart Hot 100)	11
France (SNEP)	1

=== Year-end charts ===
Year-end chart performance for "Petit Frank"
Chart (1991)	Position
Europe (Eurochart Hot 100)	70

== See also ==
- List of number-one singles of 1990 (France)
- List of number-one singles of 1991 (France)
