= Doucement =

Doucement may refer to:

== Music ==
- "Doucement" (Liane Foly song)
- "Doucement" (Makassy song)
- "Doucement", by Mac Tyer
- "Doucement", by Henri Salvador
- "Doucement", by Michel Jonasz
- "Doucement", by Roch Voisine
