= Une Présence =

Studio album by François Feldman
- Released: 22 October 1989
- Recorded: France
- Genre: Dance-pop
- Length: 50:52
- Label: Phonogram

François Feldman chronology
Vivre Vivre (1987)	Une Présence (1989)	Magic boul'vard (1991)

Singles from Une Présence
- 1. "Joue pas" Released: 15 July 1989; 2. "Les Valses de Vienne" Released: 23 November 1989; 3. "C'est toi qui m'as fait" Released: April 1990; 4. "Petit Frank" Released: 6 October 1990; 5. "J'ai peur" Released: February 1991

Une Présence is a 1989 audio album recorded by French singer François Feldman. It provided two number one, two number two and one number seven singles in France. It remains to date the singer's most successful album, achieving Diamond status. The album also helped launch the career of American vocalist Joniece Jamison, who participated in two songs recorded as duets. In France, the album was charted for 86 weeks from 22 October 1989. It peaked at number two for one month and stayed in the top ten for 46 weeks.

== Track listings ==
All tracks written and composed by François Feldman, M. Moreau and J. Moreau.

No.	Title	Length
1.	"J'ai peur^{1}"	5:43
2.	"Les Valses de Vienne"	4:06
3.	"Oser Oser"	4:10
4.	"Une Présence"	3:45
5.	"Bébé faut qu'on s'casse"	4:20
6.	"Fragile Queen"	6:05
7.	"Petit Frank"	3:56
8.	"C'est toi qui m'as fait"	5:28
9.	"Pour faire tourner le monde"	3:56
10.	"Longue Nuit"	4:37
11.	"Joue pas^{1}"	6:46

^{1} Duet with Joniece Jamison

== Personnel ==
- Kako Besset – trumpet
- Dominique Blanc-Francard – mixing
- Patrick Bourgoin – saxophone
- Debbie Davis – choir, chorus
- Jean-Claude Dubois – strings
- Thierry Durbet – arranger, programming, clavier
- François Feldman – choir, chorus, piano, arranger
- Jean Fredenucci – Producer
- Joniece Jamison – choir, chorus
- Didier Makaga – choir, chorus
- Antonietti Pascault – design
- Olivier Richter – assistant engineer
- Kamil Rustam – guitar

== Charts and sales ==
Chart (1989)	Peak position
French SNEP Albums Chart	2

Country	Certification	Date	Sales certified
France	Diamond	1991	1,000,000
