= Joy (François Feldman song) =

1992 single by François Feldman

Single by François Feldman

from the album Magic Boul'vard
- B-side: "Belle Indienne"
- Released: February 1992
- Recorded: France, 1991
- Genre: Pop, Dance
- Length: 3:57
- Label: Phonogram
- Songwriter(s): François Feldman
- Producer(s): François Feldman

François Feldman singles chronology
"Magic Boul'vard" (1991)	"Joy" (1992)	"Tombé d'amour" (1992)

"Joy" is a 1992 song recorded by French singer-songwriter François Feldman. It was the third single from his third album Magic Boul'vard, and was released in February 1992. The song, the singer's 12th single overall, achieved great success in France, becoming the best-selling single of the year.

== Composition ==
Unlike his previous singles, "Joy" was fully created by Feldman: he wrote the lyrics, composed the music and produced the song. Background vocals are performed by the singer's friends Carole Fredericks and Joniece Jamison (who recorded with him the hit singles "Joue pas" in 1989 and "J'ai peur" in 1991) and the Chorus of the Little Children of Asnières. The song has dance influences and is a tribute to Feldman's daughter, Joy. It was also recorded in Spanish on the album Magic Boul'vard, and was included on the compilations Two Feldman (1996), Best Feldman (1998) and Gold (2008), It was performed during Feldman's 1991 tour and therefore included on the live album Feldman à Bercy (1992).

== Chart performance ==
In France, "Joy" entered the singles chart at number 15 on 8 February 1992, then entered the top ten, becoming Feldman's eighth top ten hit in France. It topped the chart in its 12th week, dislodging Ten Sharp's hit "You". It stayed at number one for eight weeks, before being replaced at the top by Nirvana's "Smells Like Teen Spirit"; it went to number two and remained at this position for four weeks, In total, it spent 23 weeks in the top ten and 28 weeks on the top 50. "Joy" is Feldman's most successful single in terms of chart positions and allowed him to establish what was at the time a record third number one hit, after "Les Valses de Vienne" and "Petit Frank". On the European Hot 100, "Joy" entered at number 73 on 22 February 1991, peaked at number 12 in its 12th and 13th weeks, and totalled 15 weeks in the top 20 and 26 weeks on the chart.

== Track listings ==
- 7" single, CD single, cassette
1. "Joy" – 3:57
2. "Belle Indienne" – 4:29
- 12" maxi
1. "Joy" (maxi version) – 6:42
2. "Joy" (instrumental) – 3:57
- CD maxi
1. "Joy" – 3:57
2. "Belle Indienne" – 4:29
3. "Joy" (maxi version) – 6:42

== Charts ==
=== Weekly charts ===
Chart (1992)	Peak position
Europe (European Hot 100)	12
France (SNEP)	1
Quebec (ADISQ)	2

=== Year-end charts ===
Chart (1992)	Position
Europe (Eurochart Hot 100)	27
France (SNEP)	1

== Release history ==
Country	Date	Format	Label
France	December 1991	7" single	Big Bang, Phonogram
France	December 1991	12" maxi	Big Bang, Phonogram
France	December 1991	CD single	Big Bang, Phonogram
France	December 1991	CD maxi	Big Bang, Phonogram
France	December 1991	Cassette	Big Bang, Phonogram
Germany	February 1992	CD maxi	Metronome
Spain	February 1992	Promotional 7" single	Big Bang, Phonogram

== See also ==
- List of number-one singles of 1992 (France)
