= Le Mal de toi =

1989 single by François Feldman

Single by François Feldman

from the album Vivre, Vivre
- B-side: "Le Mal de toi (symphonic version)"
- Released: December 1988
- Recorded: 1986
- Studio: Studio du Palais des Congrès, Paris
- Genre: Pop
- Length: 4:18
- Label: Phonogram, Big Bang
- Songwriter(s): Jean-Marie Moreau, François Feldman
- Producer(s): Jean Fredenucci

François Feldman singles chronology
"Je te retrouverai" (1988)	"Le Mal de toi" (1988)	"Joue pas" (1989)

"Le Mal de toi" is a 1986 song recorded by French singer François Feldman. It was written by Jean-Marie Moreau and Feldman and was released in December 1988 as the fifth and last single from the album Vivre, Vivre, released the previous year, on which it appears as the ninth track. It provided Feldman second top ten hit in France and the second best-selling single from the album, behind "Slave".

The song was included on Feldman's three best of compilations but in the live version recorded during the 1991 tour at Bercy: first on Two Feldman (1996) on which it appears as the eighth track on the second CD, then on Best Feldman (1998) as the 14th track, last on Gold (2008) as the eighth track on the second CD; it was also included on the live album Feldman à Bercy (1992).

== Chart performance ==
In France, "Le Mal de toi" debuted at number 40 on the chart edition of 11 February 1998, reached a peak of number nine six weeks later, totalled two weeks in the top ten and 16 weeks in the top 50. It achieved Silver status, awarded by the Syndicat National de l'Édition Phonographique, the French certificator, for over 200,000 units. On the European Hot 100 Singles, it entered at number 91 on 11 March 1989, reached number 35, its highest position, in its fifth week, and fell off the chart after 12 weeks of presence.

== Track listings ==
- 7" single
1. "Le Mal de toi" (single version) — 4:18
2. "Le Mal de toi" (symphonic version) — 2:58
- 12" maxi
1. "Le Mal de toi" (album version) — 5:30
2. "Le Mal de toi" (symphonic version) — 2:58
3. "Elle me rend barbare" — 3:25
- CD maxi
1. "Le Mal de toi" (album version) — 5:30
2. "Elle me rend barbare" — 3:25
3. "Suis-moi jusqu'au vertige" (remix version) — 4:58
4. "Le Mal de toi" (symphonic version) — 2:58

== Charts and certifications ==
=== Weekly charts ===
Chart (1989)	Peak position
Europe (European Hot 100)	35
France (SNEP)	9

=== Certifications ===
Certifications for "Le Mal de toi"
Region	Certification	Certified units/sales
France (SNEP)	Silver	200,000^{*}
^{*} Sales figures based on certification alone.

== Release history ==
Country	Date	Format	Label
France	December 1988	7" single	Big Bang, Phonogram
France	December 1988	12" maxi	Big Bang, Phonogram
France	December 1988	CD maxi	Big Bang, Phonogram
