= Le Chat (song) =

Single by Pow woW

from the album Regagner les plaines
- B-side: "Run on (God's Gonna Cut You Down)"
- Released: May 1992
- Recorded: France, 1992
- Genre: A cappella
- Length: 2:54
- Label: Remark
- Songwriters: Ahmed Mouici; Pascal Periz; Bertrand Pierre; Alain Chennevière

Pow woW singles chronology
"Le Chat" (1992)	"Le lion est mort ce soir" (1992)

"Le Chat" is a 1992 song recorded by French act Pow woW. Written by the band's four members (Ahmed Mouici, Pascal Periz, Bertrand Pierre and Alain Chennevière), this a cappella song was the first single from its debut album Regagner les plaines, and was released in May 1992 with two different single covers for the formats: the first is a photo of the band on a red and black background, and the second is a drawing which shows a cat's tail. "Le Chat" had great success in France where it was a number-one hit for seven weeks, becoming a popular song throughout the years, and was awarded 'Song of the year' in the 1993 Victoires de la Musique.

== Cricial reception ==
Elia Habib, an expert on French charts, said that the song has "irresistible rhythms, notes, onomatopoeic sounds and vocals remarkably built on shrewdly exquisite contrasts and nuances"; he also stated: "The text, lively and original, is a sort of declaration of love vacillating between moving mewings and seductive purrs, before finishing in a hunter scratch".

== Cover versions ==
In France, the song was covered in 2004 by Star Academy 4 on the album Les Meilleurs Moments; this cover features as the seventh track on the album and is also available in an instrumental version.

== Chart performance ==
In France, "Le Chat" debuted at number 42 on the chart edition of 30 May 1992, then climbed quickly and entered the top ten in the fifth week. It topped the chart two weeks later and stayed there for two months. Then it dropped slowly, totalling 18 weeks in the top ten and 28 weeks on the chart (top 50). "Le Chat" remained the only number-one single recorded a cappella. It was also the second biggest hit of 1992 in France, behind François Feldman's "Joy". In Belgium (Wallonia), it peaked at number five on 31 October 1992. On the European Hot 100, it stated at number 39 on 11 July 1992 and peaked at number 13 five weeks later, and fell off the chart after 21 weeks of presence.

== Track listings ==
- CD single
1. "Le Chat" — 2:54
2. "Run on (God's Gonna Cut You Down)" — 2:23
- 7" single
1. "Le Chat" — 2:54
2. "Run on (God's Gonna Cut You Down)" — 2:23

== Charts and sales ==
=== Weekly charts ===
Chart (1992)	Peak position
Belgium (Ultratop 50 Wallonia)	5
France (SNEP)	1
Europe (European Hot 100)	13

=== Year-end charts ===
Chart (1992)	Position
Europe (Eurochart Hot 100)	38
France (Airplay Chart)	6
France (SNEP)	2

== See also ==
- List of number-one singles of 1992 (France)
