= C'est toi qui m'as fait =

1990 single by François Feldman

Single by François Feldman

from the album Une Présence
- B-side: "Pour faire tourner le monde"
- Released: 1990
- Recorded: 1989
- Genre: Pop
- Length: 3:54
- Label: Phonogram
- Songwriters: Jean-Marie Moreau, François Feldman, Thierry Durbet
- Producers: Fred Fraikin, Jean Fredenucci, Guy Walker

François Feldman singles chronology
| "Les Valses de Vienne" (1989) | "C'est toi qui m'as fait" (1990) | "Petit Frank" (1990) |

"C'est toi qui m'as fait" is a 1989 song recorded by French singer François Feldman. Written by Jean-Marie Moreau, Thierry Durbet and Feldman, it was released in April 1990 as the third single from the album Une Présence (1989), on which it appears as the eighth track. It achieved a commercial success, becoming Feldman's successive third top two hit from the album.

== Lyrics ==
Lyrically, "C'est toi qui m'as fait" is a tribute to Feldman's mother, referring to her as the person who "built" and "created" him, and his father, who expected for a daughter when his wife was pregnant.

== Versions ==
"C'est toi qui m'as fait" was included on Feldman's three best of, in a remixed version: first on Two Feldman (1996) on which it appears as the fourth track on the first CD, then on Best Feldman (1998) as the third track, last on Gold (2008) as the fourth track. It was also performed during Feldman's 1991 tour and thus included on the live album Feldman à Bercy (1992).

== Chart performance ==
In France, "C'est toi qui m'as fait" debuted at number 24 on the chart edition of 14 April 1990, reached the top ten two weeks later, peaked at number two in its eighth week, being unable to dislodge Elton John's "Sacrifice", which topped the chart then. It totalled 12 weeks in the top ten and fell off the top 50 after 18 weeks. It achieved Silver status, awarded by the Syndicat National de l'Édition Phonographique, the French certificator, for over 200,000 units sold. On the Eurochart Hot 100 Singles, it debuted at number 71 on 28 April 1990 and peaked at number 11 in the eighth week, and spent 16 weeks on the chart. Much aired on French radios, it also charted for 11 weeks on the European Airplay Top 100, with a peak at number 20 on 2 June 1990, in the fourth week.

== Track listings ==
- 7" single
1. "C'est toi qui m'as fait" — 3:54
2. "Pour faire tourner le monde" — 3:50
- 12" maxi
1. "C'est toi qui m'as fait" (Extended version) — 5:35
2. "Pour faire tourner le monde" — 3:50
3. "C'est toi qui m'as fait" (Single version) — 3:54
- CD maxi
1. "C'est toi qui m'as fait" (Single version) — 3:54
2. "Bébé faut qu'on s'casse" — 4:26
3. "Oser, Oser" — 4:07
4. "C'est toi qui m'as fait" (Extended version) — 5:35

== Charts ==
=== Weekly charts ===
Weekly chart performance for "C'est toi qui m'as fait"
| Chart (1990) | Peak position |
|---|---|
| Europe (European Airplay Top 50) | 20 |
| Europe (Eurochart Hot 100 Singles) | 11 |
| France (Airplay Top 20 [AM Stations]) | 1 |
| France (SNEP) | 2 |
| Quebec (ADISQ) | 18 |

=== Year-end charts ===
Year-end chart performance for "C'est toi qui m'as fait"
| Chart (1990) | Position |
|---|---|
| Europe (Eurochart Hot 100) | 64 |

== Certifications ==
Certifications for "C'est toi qui m'as fait"
| Region | Certification | Certified units/sales |
|---|---|---|
| France (SNEP) | Silver | 200,000^{*} |
^{*} Sales figures based on certification alone.

== Release history ==
| Country | Date | Format | Label |
|---|---|---|---|
| Canada | 1989 | Promotional 7" single | Philips |
| France | 1990 | 12" maxi | Big Bang, Phonogram |
| France | 1990 | 7" single | Big Bang, Phonogram |
| France | 1990 | CD maxi | Big Bang, Phonogram |
| Germany | 1990 | 12" maxi | Metronome |
| Germany | 1990 | 7" single | Metronome |
| Germany | 1990 | CD maxi | Metronome |
