= Qui a le droit... =

Single by Patrick Bruel

from the album Si ce soir...
- B-side: "J'roule vers toi" (live)
- Released: October 1991
- Recorded: 1991
- Genre: Pop
- Length: 4:40
- Label: RCA PB
- Songwriters: Gérard Presgurvic, Patrick Bruel
- Producers: Patrick Bruel, Mick Lanaro

Patrick Bruel singles chronology
"Décalé" (1991)	"Qui a le droit..." (1991)	"Bouge !" (1994)

"Qui a le droit..." is a pop song recorded by French artist Patrick Bruel. Written and composed by Gérard Presgurvic and Patrick Bruel, it was the first single from his album Si ce soir..., recorded after his first concerts tour. It was released in a live version in late October 1991 under RCA label and was a hit in France, becoming Bruel's only number-one single.

== Cover versions ==
"Qui a le droit..." was overdubbed as a duet in 2004 by Bruel with Ana Torroja (Mecano's member) for the albums Puzzle and the compilation Duos. Bruel also recorded a cover with Zazie, Isabelle Boulay, Corneille, Garou and Jean-Baptiste Maunier for Les Enfoirés' 2005 album Le Train des Enfoirés, also available on the best of La Compil' (vol.3). The children choir named Vox Angeli made also a cover of the song on its 2008 successful eponymous album. Sowatt covered the song in a rock version. In 2016, Kids United covered the song on their album Tout le bonheur du monde and this version peaked at number 195 on the French Singles Chart. Bruel performed "Qui a le droit..." live at the 2008 Telethon in Roubaix.

== Music video ==
The accompanying music video depicts a live performance of the song with Bruel on piano and vocals, and showcases a key moment when it seems that it is the crowd of thousands of concert-goers who have taken over performing the song from the pianist/vocalist. The song was included on Bruel's albums Plaza de los heroes (1995), Patrick Bruel (2002), S'laisser aimer (triple best of, 2007) and Live - Des souvenirs... ensemble (2007).

== Chart performance ==
In France, after a debut at number 5 on the chart edition of 2 November 1991, it topped the singles chart five weeks later and for non consecutives seven weeks, and totalled 20 weeks in the top ten and 25 weeks in the top 50. It was the first live single to top the French chart and achieved Gold status awarded by the Syndicat National de l'Édition Phonographique. On the European Hot 100, it debuted at number 24 on 16 November 1991 and reached number eight twice, in its fourth and seventh weeks, and remained for 19 weeks on the chart.

== Track listings ==
- 7" single
1. "Qui a le droit..." (live) – 4:40
2. "J'roule vers toi" (live) – 5:13
- CD maxi
1. "Qui a le droit..." (live) – 4:40
2. "J'roule vers toi" (live) – 5:13
3. "Jef" (live) – 3:47
- Cassette
1. "Qui a le droit..." (live) – 4:40
2. "J'roule vers toi" (live) – 5:13

== Credits ==
- Written by Gérard Presgurvic
- Composed by Patrick Bruel
- Executive producer : Mick Lanaro
- Editions : RCA / BMG
- Catalog# : PB 44991

== Charts ==
=== Weekly charts ===
Weekly chart performance for "Qui a le droit..."
Chart (1991–1992)	Peak position
Belgium (Ultratop 50 Flanders)	50
Belgium (Ultratop 50 Wallonia)	2
Europe (European Hot 100)	8
France (SNEP)	1
Quebec (ADISQ)	1

=== Year-end charts ===
Year-end chart performance for "Qui a le droit..."
Chart (1992)	Peak position
Europe (Eurochart Hot 100)	71

== Certifications ==
Certifications for "Qui a le droit..."
Region	Certification	Certified units/sales
France (SNEP)	Gold	250,000^{*}
^{*} Sales figures based on certification alone.

== See also ==
- List of number-one singles of 1991 (France)
- List of number-one singles of 1992 (France)
