= Boris Roatta =

French actor (1980–1994)

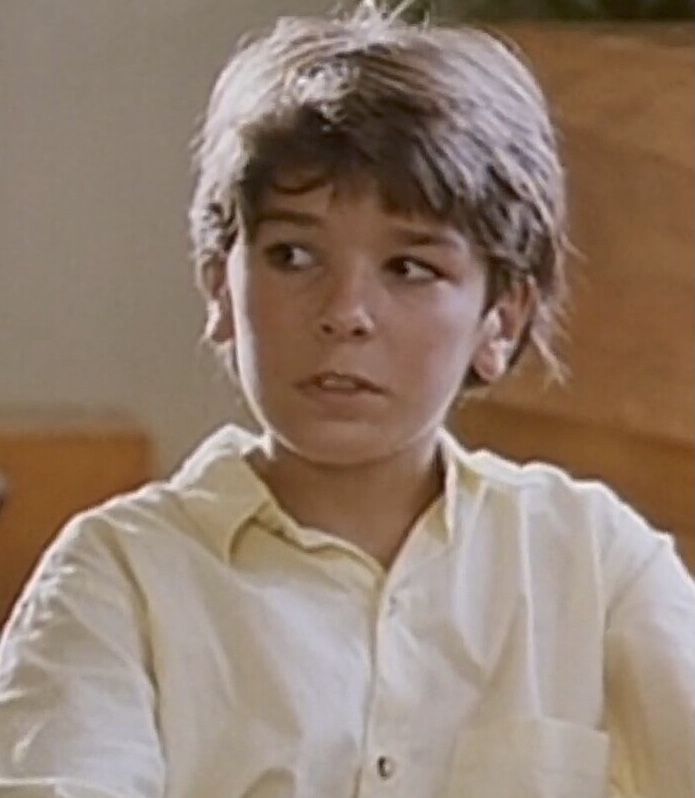
- Roatta in L'Instit (1993)
- Born: 1 July 1980; Paris, France
- Died: 25 August 1994 (aged 14); Aiguilles, Hautes-Alpes, France
- Occupations: Actor; voice actor
- Years active: 1988–1994

Boris Roatta (1 July 1980 – 25 August 1994) was a French child actor who focused his career on film, television and voice dubbing.

== Biography ==
Born in Paris, Roatta began his career on film as a child in the late 1980s. He began appearing on television in the early 1990s and he gained notice for his role as the title character’s son Frédéric Moulin in the popular television series Commissaire Moulin in which he only appeared in three episodes. He was also a voice actor, as he most notably dubbed the voice of Macaulay Culkin in the Home Alone film series as well as Getting Even with Dad.

In animation, Roatta provided the French dubbing voices of Flounder in The Little Mermaid and Cody in The Rescuers Down Under.

== Death ==
On 25 August 1994, Roatta was struck by a car and was killed instantly while he was cycling across Aiguilles. He was 14 years old. He was laid to rest in a cemetery located in the same city where he died.

== Filmography ==
=== Music video ===
- "Petit Frank" (1990) - Frank

=== Cinema ===
- Bonjour l'angoisse (1988) – Olivier

=== Television ===
- Sabine j'imagine (1992) – Nicolas
- Commissaire Moulin (1992–1993) – Frédéric Moulin
- L'Instit (1993) – Paulo
- Les Grandes Marées (1993) – David Marret
- Le silence du cœur (1994) – Pierre Baumann

=== Dubbing ===
- Cinema Paradiso (1988) – Salvatore Di Vita as a child
- Uncle Buck (1989) – Miles’ friend
- The Little Mermaid (1989) – Flounder
- Home Alone (1990) – Kevin McCallister
- The Rescuers Down Under (1990) – Cody
- Kindergarten Cop (1990) – Dominic
- City Slickers (1991) – Danny Robbins
- The Jacksons: An American Dream (1992) – Michael Jackson (aged 9–14)
- The Mighty Ducks (1992) – Terry Hall
- Home Alone 2: Lost in New York (1992) – Kevin McCallister
- Dennis the Menace (1993) – Joey
- The Good Son (1993) – Henry Evans
- Getting Even with Dad (1994) – Timmy Gleason
- The Client (1994) – Mark Sway

=== Stage ===
- La Ville dont le prince est un enfant (1993) – Serge Souplier
