= What War May Bring =

Ces amours-là
- Directed by: Claude Lelouch
- Written by: Claude Lelouch; Pierre Uytterhoeven
- Produced by: Claude Lelouch; Rémi Bergman; Les Films 13; François Kraus; Denis Pineau-Valencienne
- Starring: Dominique Pinon; Jacky Ido; Audrey Dana; Anouk Aimée; Kristina Cepraga
- Cinematography: Gerard de Battista
- Edited by: Charlotte Lecoeur; Stéphane Mazalaigue
- Music by: Harald Maury
- Production companies: Les Films du Kiosque; France 3 Cinéma; Studio 37
- Distributed by: Rezo Films
- Release dates: 16 June 2010 (Moscow); 15 September 2010 (France)
- Running time: 120 minutes
- Country: France
- Language: French
- Budget: $8.2 million
- Box office: $2.1 million

What War May Bring (French: Ces amours-là) is a 2010 French film directed by Claude Lelouch. It is also known as What Love May Bring.

== Plot ==
Ilva is a woman who falls in love too easily. Unaware and unconcerned about how her passion may be perceived, she finds herself having to live with the consequences of her actions. First, in the middle of the German occupation in Paris, she falls for a Nazi, which indirectly leads to the death of her father. For many, her relationship was interpreted as her collaboration with the Nazis. Her next love story, however, bring additional tragedy. During the liberation of France in '44, when she is violently summoned to answer for her relationship with the German, she is saved by two Americans GIs, one white and one black. She falls in love with both these men, at the same time. Her inability to choose between them, creates conflict, unhappiness and murder.

The film combines history, music, and a little absurdity to treat the subject of love, passion, and destiny.

== Cast ==
- Dominique Pinon as Maurice Lemoine
- Jacky Ido as Bob Kane
- Anouk Aimée as Madame Blum
- Audrey Dana as Ilva / Simone / Sophia
  - Gisèle Casadesus as Old Ilva
- Kristina Cepraga as Brigitte Bardot
- Samuel Labarthe as Horst
- Gilles Lemaire as Jim Singer
- Laurent Couson as Simon
- Judith Magre as Esther
- Raphaël Haroche as Louis
- Lise Lamétrie as Madame Dubois
- Christine Citti as The poisoner
- Piotr Polak as a The German soldier
- Zinedine Soualem as The accordionist
- Liane Foly as The street singer
- Anggun as herself
