= Coup de Boule =

"Coup de boule"

Single by La Plage
- Released: July 2006
- Recorded: 2006
- Genre: Pop
- Length: 2:43
- Label: Up Music
- Songwriter(s): Sébastien Lipszyc; Emmanuel Lipszyc; F. Lascombes

"Coup de Boule" (French for "headbutt") is a French song written and performed by brothers Sébastien and Emmanuel Lipszyc, who run a firm called La Plage that produces television jingles, and Franck Lascombes. The soca-style song is about the France national football team's appearance at the 2006 FIFA World Cup Final, especially Zinedine Zidane's headbutt on Marco Materazzi. After its release, the song spread throughout the world via the Internet and topped the French and Belgian (Wallonia) charts.

== Background and writing ==
The song was written and recorded in half an hour on 10 July 2006, the day after the World Cup Final, and parodies "Zidane y va marquer" by Cauet. The Lipszyc brothers and Lascombes distributed the song as a joke to about 50 friends over the Internet, and within hours it was playlisted by Skyrock, one of France's largest independent radio stations. By 12 July Warner Music won the bidding war to license the song. It was released as a one-song CD on 20 July and reached number one on the French charts on 2 August, supplanting "Zidane y va marquer". As of July 2014, it is the 82nd best-selling single of the 21st century in France, with 334,000 units sold.

There is also a Spanish version of the song. The CD single was released on 28 July 2006, while the international CD maxi was launched on 15 September 2006.

In France, the song was covered by Zouk de Foot who peaked at #82 on 12 August 2006.

== Track listings ==
CD single

1. "Coup de boule" — 2:43
2. "Coup de boule" (instrumental) — 2:43

International - CD maxi

1. "Coup de boule" — 2:43
2. "Ballo della Capocciata" — 2:43
3. "Zutsuki de Zidana" — 2:43
4. "Cudebul" — 2:43
5. "Coup de boule" (video)

== Certifications and sales ==
| Country | Certification | Date | Sales certified | Physical sales |
|---|---|---|---|---|
| Belgium | Gold | 2 September 2006 | 20,000 | |
| France | Should be Platinum | — | — | 333,518 |

== Charts ==
| Chart (2006) | Peak position |
|---|---|
| Belgian (Wallonia) Singles Chart | 1 |
| Eurochart Hot 100 | 4 |
| French Singles Chart | 1 |
| Italian Singles Chart | 2 |
| Swiss Singles Chart | 2 |

| End of year chart (2006) | Peak position |
|---|---|
| Belgian (Wallonia) Singles Chart | 2 |
| French Singles Chart | 3 |
