= Philippe Falliex =

French composer

Philippe Falliex (Born 27 April 1966 in Lyon, France) is a French composer specializing in background music for television and radio programs.

== Stereolithe: 2001-present ==
Since 2001, Philippe Falliex has dedicated himself to composing music for televised and radio programs. He created Stereolithe, a company through which his work is contracted. Stereolithe has been responsible for the theme and background music for some of the most prominent shows on French television and radio.

=== Television shows for which he composed music ===
1. Sans Auncun Doute (More than 400 episodes)
2. Le grand Frère, Confession Intime
3. Les soirées Anti-Arnaque
4. Le grand Quizz
5. La soirée du Sommeil
6. Une nuit à Marrakech
7. Au cœur de L’armée de Terre
8. En vol avec l’armée de l’air
9. Les Voisins
10. Les Sept Péchés Capitaux
11. Otto
12. Les imitateurs
13. Ca peut vous arriver
14. Le champion du rire
15. Le champion de la télé
16. La Maison du Bluff
17. Zone Paranormale

=== Radio shows for which he composed music ===
1. La bonne touche, hosted by Jean-Pierre Foucault et Cyril Hanouna
2. L’heure du crime, hosted by Jacques Pradel
3. Tout le plaisir est pour nous, hosted by Flavie Flament
4. Le grand quiz des histoires de France, hosted by Laurent Boyer
5. On refait la semaine
6. La tête dans les étoiles

== Early years (1984-2000) ==
Philippe Falliex started his career as a professional drummer, playing for many different artists on several international tours and studio sessions. Within these years he also composed several songs for his sister, composing the album Caméléon almost in its entirety

=== Songs he composed ===
1. Caméléon
2. Dame Brune
3. Être vrai
4. Fantôme de l’amour
5. La valse des anges
6. Le silence à des ailes
7. Les petites cicatrices
8. N’importe où fera l’affaire
9. Tant pis si j’ai mal
10. Toutes les histoires
11. Aime- moi
12. C’est bon d’aimer
13. C’est la vie
14. Ces petits riens
15. Entre nous
16. De l’autre côté du temps

Note: All songs interpreted by Liane Foly

== Other endeavours ==
Since 2000 Philippe Falliex holds the patent in Europe Canada, the US, and Japan for a revolutionary drum pedal which allows for infinite new rhythms to be explored (United States Patent 6087573)

He was also the artistic director and musical arranger for the following productions

Catalogue de My Edition Company (composer, producer, more than 400 tracks)

1. DVD Liane Foly / La Folle Parenthese (artistic director/executive producer)
2. La Star Académie (sound director from 2006 to 2008)
3. Cameleon by Liane Foly
4. Entre Nous by Liane Foly
5. Hymne du stade de France (arrangement, composer)
6. Album Elonakane (released by Universal in 2010 / co-production Stephane Courbis, artistic director/executive producer)
7. Émission Interne HSBC (artistic director / executive producer)
8. Stephane Sage (artistic director / executive producer)
9. Aila Onda (artistic director / executive producer)
10. Orchestre National du Maroc (PBO)
11. Pepito (musical director)
12. Dodge (executive producer)
13. Gerald Dahan
14. Laâm (PBO)
15. Natascha St Pierre (PBO)
16. Gerald Dahan (PBO)
17. Michel Villano (PBO)
18. Michael Gregorio (PBO)
19. Dany Mauro (PBO)

== Musical Education ==
- Musician's Institute of Los Angeles, California
- Drummers' Collective of New York City, New York

== Awards ==
1. Médaille de la SACEM en 2007
2. Membre Permanent de la SACEM
3. Disque de platine pour le disque "Entre Nous..." de Liane Foly
4. Double Disque d'or pour l'album “Acoustique” de Liane Foly
5. Double Disque d'or pour l'album “Caméléon” de Liane Foly
6. Gold Certificatione for the album “Lumière” de Liane Foly

== Personal life ==
Falliex was born in France to Algerian parents, and is the brother of French pop singer Liane Foly.
