= Joue pas =

1989 single by François Feldman and Joniece Jamison

Single by François Feldman and Joniece Jamison

from the album Une Présence
- B-side: "Instrumental"
- Released: 15 July 1989
- Recorded: France, 1989
- Genre: Pop, funk
- Length: 4:02
- Label: Phonogram, Metronome
- Songwriters: François Feldman; Thierry Durbet
- Producer: Jean Fredenucci

François Feldman and Joniece Jamison singles chronology
| "Le Mal de toi" (1989) | "Joue pas" (1989) | "Les Valses de Vienne" (1989) |

"Joue pas" (transl. French for "Don't play") is a 1989 song recorded by French artist François Feldman as a duet with the American singer Joniece Jamison. It was released in July 1989 as the first single from Feldman's album Une Présence, and was his fifth single overall. It achieved great success, becoming a number two hit and a popular song throughout the years.

The song was included on Feldman's three best of compilations Two Feldman (1996), Best Feldman (1998) and Gold (2008). It was also performed during Feldman's 1991 tour and was thus included on the live album Feldman à Bercy (1992).

== Lyrics and music ==
Written and composed by François Feldman and Thierry Durbet, "Joue pas" has funky sonorities, starts with a brief guitar riff, and was "very well received by the public". It was Feldman's first duet in his career, followed by other two ones with Joniece Jamison, namely "J'ai peur", released as a single in 1991, and "Love platonique" in 1996.

== Critical reception ==
A review in Pan-European magazine Music & Media deemed "Joue pas" as "a commercial pop song, profiting from a bouncing dance beat. Jamison's vocals have a definite R&B feel"; it also considered it as "an outstanding duo in the tradition of romantic and touching love songs".

== Chart performance ==
In France, "Joue pas" debuted at number 47 on 15 July 1989, climbed quickly and entered the top ten in its fourth week. It hit number two for five non consecutive weeks, but was unable to dislodge Kaoma's smash hit "Lambada" which topped the chart then. Thereafter, it dropped and totaled 14 weeks in the top ten and 22 weeks on the top 50. On the European Hot 100 Singles, it started at number 71 on 12 August 1989 and reached a peak of number 12 seven weeks later.

== Cover versions ==
The song was covered in 2000 by Karen Mulder, Roch Voisine and Ophélie Winter on Les Enfoirés' album Les Enfoirés en 2000. This 3:46 version is the 11th track. It was also covered in 2002 by Houcine and Anne-Laure Sibon, two contestants of Star Academy 2, on the album Fait sa boum. In 2008, French DJ Soma Riba, who covered many 1980s songs, made his own version of the song and, as for the original one, recorded it as a duet with Joniece Jamison.

== Track listings ==
- 7" single
1. "Joue pas" — 4:02
2. "Joue pas" (instrumental) — 4:00
- 12" maxi
1. "Joue pas" (maxi) — 6:45
2. "Joue pas" (instrumental) — 6:10

== Charts and certifications ==
=== Weekly charts ===
| Chart (1989–90) | Peak position |
|---|---|
| Europe (European Airplay Top 50) | 15 |
| Europe (European Hot 100) | 12 |
| Germany (Airplay Top 20) | 12 |
| Germany (GfK) | 46 |
| France (SNEP) | 2 |
| Quebec (ADISQ) | 20 |

=== Year-end charts ===
| Chart (1989) | Peak position |
|---|---|
| Europe (European Hot 100) | 53 |

=== Certifications ===
Certifications for "Joue pas"
| Region | Certification | Certified units/sales |
|---|---|---|
| France (SNEP) | Gold | 400,000^{*} |
^{*} Sales figures based on certification alone.
