= Maxime Le Forestier =

French singer-songwriter (born 1949)

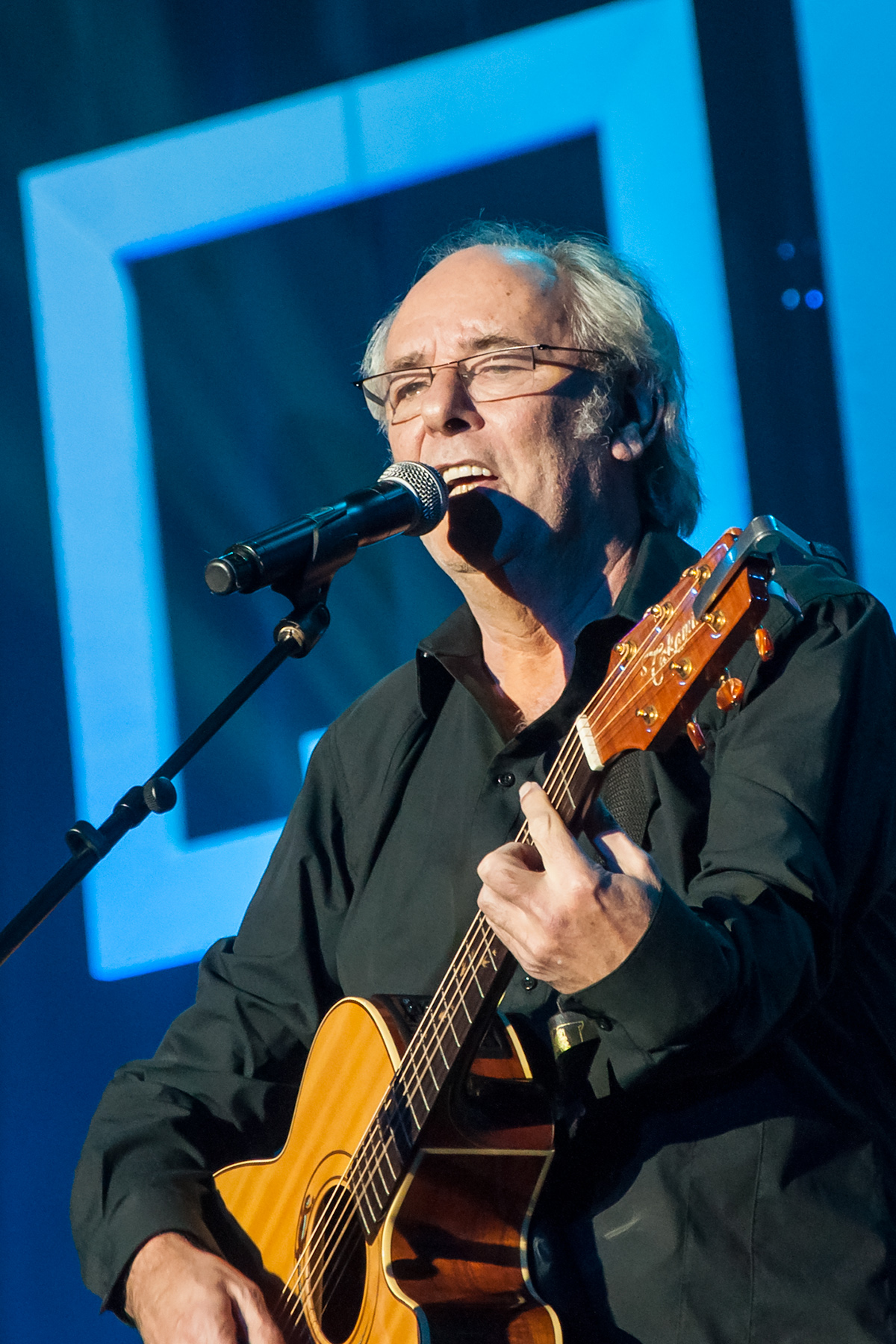
- Le Forestier in 2013

Background information
- Born: Bruno Jean Bernard Le Forestier; 10 February 1949 (age 77)
- Origin: Paris, France
- Genres: French pop, world
- Occupation: Singer-songwriter
- Years active: 1968–present
- Label: Polydor
- Website: www.maximeleforestier.net

Maxime Le Forestier (French: [maksim lə fɔʁɛstje]; born 10 February 1949 as Bruno Jean Bernard Le Forestier) is a French singer-songwriter.

== Life and career ==
Bruno Le Forestier was born on 10 February 1949 in Paris to Robert Le Forestier and Genevieve (née Lili 1917–2010), who had lived in England. He had two older sisters, Annette (born 1943) and Catherine (born 1946).

His musical training started on the violin. He attended the Lycée Condorcet, where he studied literature.

In 1965, he formed a duo (Cat et Maxime) with his sister Catherine. Playing at cabaret venues on Paris' Left Bank, the pair met and formed a friendship with Georges Moustaki. They were amongst the first artists to cover a number of songs by Moustaki – including Ma Liberté and Ma Solitude. In 1968, Catherine joined Moustaki as a backing singer. Le Forestier began to focus on songwriting and composed Ballade pour un traître which was recorded and released by the French/Italian singer and actor, Serge Reggiani.

Le Forestier continued as part-time singer/songwriter during his military service (beginning 1969) with a parachute regiment (the inspiration for the song Parachutiste). He recorded two songs: Cœur de Pierre, Face de Lune, and La Petite Fugue.

His military service ending September 1970, Le Forestier refocused on his musical career. He developed a folksy style which was enormously popular in the 1970s and 1980s. He and his sister spent the summer of 1971 living in the Castro District of San Francisco at the invitation of his friend, Luc Alexandre. The experience, and meeting Allen Ginsberg, was the inspiration of a popular song, San Francisco.

His first album Mon Frère, released in 1973, contains several pieces that have entered French folklore, including the title song Mon frère, San Francisco, Comme un arbre and Education sentimentale. He toured extensively, both in France and abroad. In 1976, he toured in 14 cities in the USSR. He has also released several albums covering songs by Georges Brassens.

== In popular culture ==
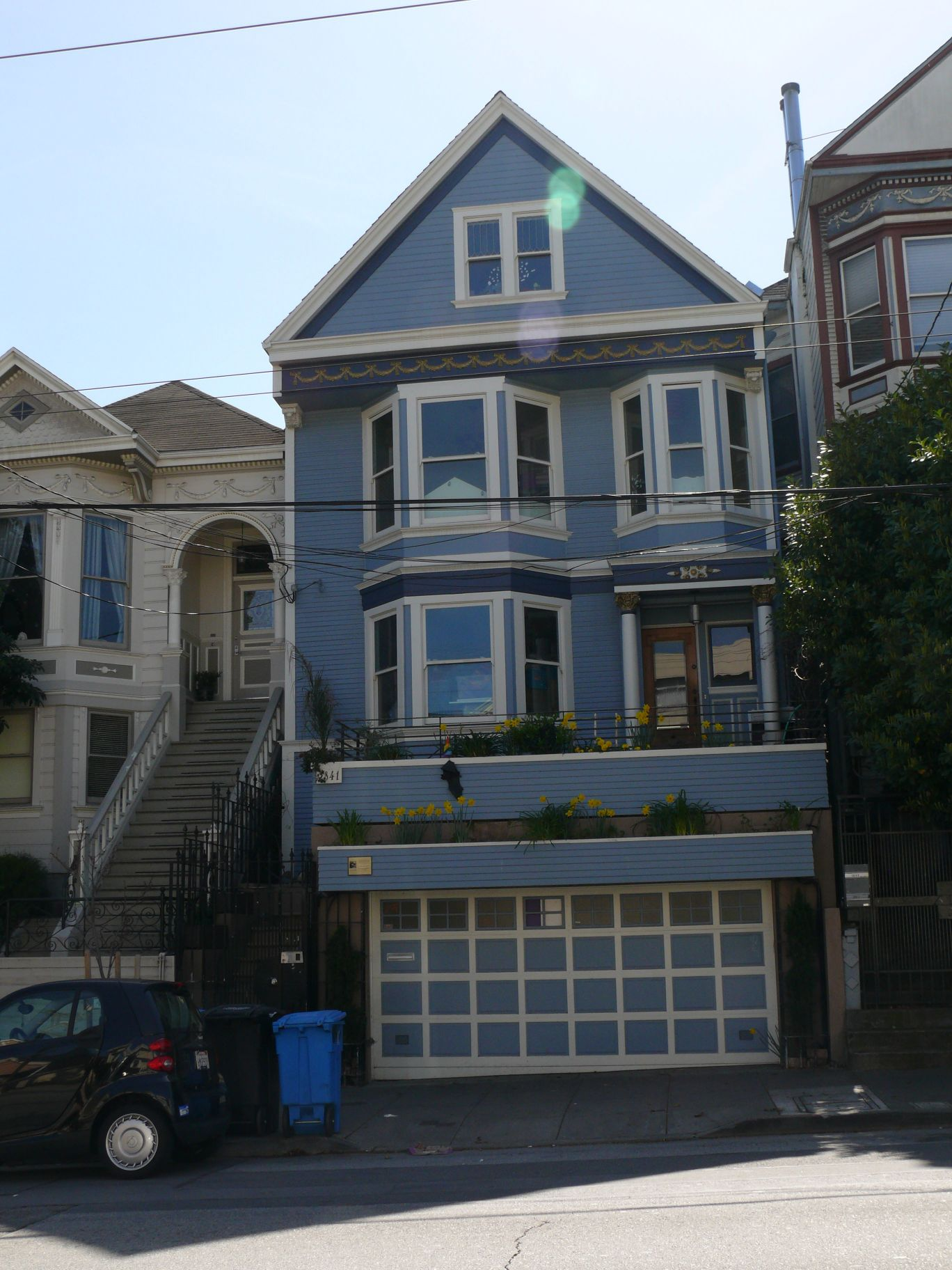
The blue house, in San Francisco

"San Francisco", one of his best known songs, begins with the line: "C'est une maison bleue adossée à la colline" (meaning "It's a blue house with its back to the hill"). In 1971, a young Le Forestier was living in a hippie commune, called "Hunga Dunga", in a blue house situated at 3841 18th Street in San Francisco. The anthemic song was written as a fond tribute to Le Forestier's housemates and hippie friends, and the names mentioned in the song refer to real people. These include Phil Polizatto, who recalls with great affection Le Forestier's stay in the blue house, in a critically acclaimed book entitled "Hunga Dunga: Confessions of an Unapologetic Hippie". In the summer of 2011, the house was repainted from light green to its original blue, and a plaque dedicated to Le Forestier was unveiled by the French Consul, pointing to the cultural importance of the song in French popular culture.

== Philanthropy ==
Maxime Le Forestier has participated in Les Enfoirés, the annual concert to raise money for the charity Restaurants du Cœur, since 1995.

== Discography ==
=== Albums ===
- 1970: Maxime Le Forestier
- 1972: Mon frère
- 1973: Le Steak
- 1974: Enregistrement public (live)
- 1975: Saltimbanque
- 1976: Hymne à Sept Temps
- 1979: Chante Brassens
- 1980: Les rendez-vous manqués
- 1978: N° 5
- 1981: Dans ces histoires...
- 1983: Les jours meilleurs
- 1986: After shave
- 1988: Né quelque part
- 1989: Bataclan 1989 (live)
- 1991: Sagesse du fou
- 1995: Passer ma route
- 1996: Chienne de route (live)
- 1996: 12 nouvelles de Brassens (Petits bonheurs posthumes (2 cd)
- 1998: Le cahier (4 cd, live)
- 2000: L'écho des étoiles
- 2002: Plutôt guitare (2 cd, live)
- 2008: Restons amants
- 2013: Le cadeau
- 2014: Olympia 2014 (live)
- 2019: Paraître ou ne pas être

=== Selected songs ===
- 1972: "Mon frère"
- 1972: "San Francisco"
- 1972: "Éducation sentimentale"
- 1972: "Parachutiste"
- 1972: "Comme un arbre"
- 1973: "Dialogue"
- 1973: "Entre 14 et 40 ans, février de cette année-là"
- 1975: "Saltimbanque"
- 1978: "Je veux quitter ce monde heureux"
- 1980: "Approximative"
- 1983: "Les jours meilleurs"
- 1983: "La salle des pas perdus"
- 1987: "Né quelque part"
- 1988: "Ambalaba"
- 1991: "Bille de verre"
- 1995: "Passer ma route"
- 1995: "Chienne d'idée"
- 2000: "L'Homme au bouquet de fleurs"
- 2008: "Restons amants"
- 2008: "Grain d'sel"
- 2013: "Mon frère"
- 2013: "Le p'tit air"

Selected collaborations and guest appearances

- 1980: Enregistrement public au Palais des sports (live double album w/ Graeme Allwright)
- 2009: Les Enfoirés 2009 - Les Enfoirés font leur cinéma ("Toi + moi", sung by Maurane, Le Forestier, Keim, Darmon, Zenatti, De Palmas, Foly, Leroy, Les Enfoirés)

| Preceded by MC Solaar | Victoires de la Musique; Male artist of the year 1996 | Succeeded by Charles Aznavour |
