= Joniece Jamison =

American singer (born 1955)

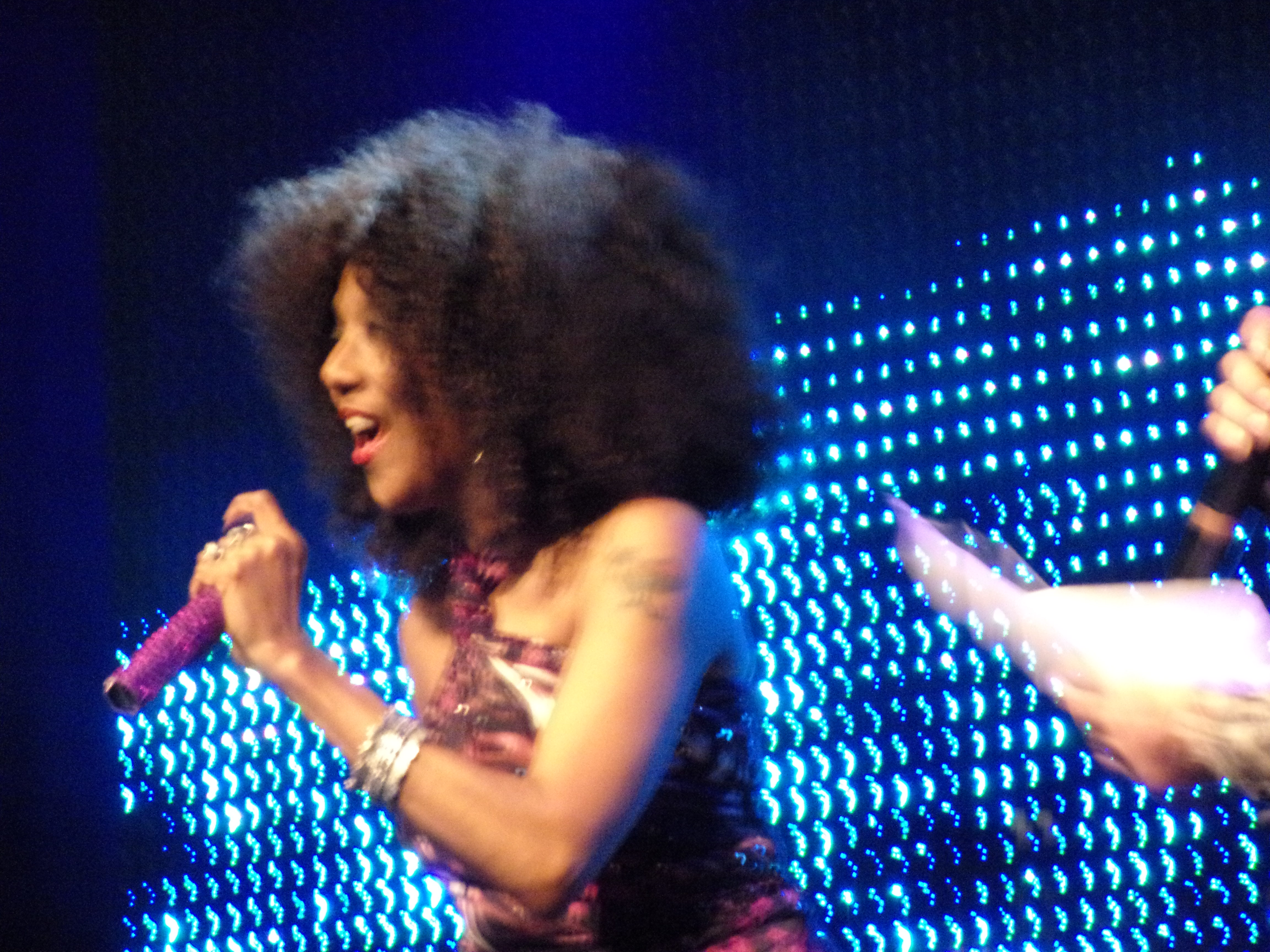

Background information
- Born: Joniece Jamison; December 11, 1955 (age 70); Baltimore, Maryland
- Origin: United States
- Genres: Pop music; soul; gospel
- Occupation: Singer
- Instrument: Vocals
- Years active: 1980's—currently

Joniece Jamison (born December 11, 1955, in Baltimore, Maryland, United States) is an American singer. In France, she achieved notability recording two successful duets with French artist François Feldman: "Joue pas" in 1989 and "J'ai peur" in 1991, which were both top ten hit in France). Her album Gospel peaked at #144 in France in January 2005.

She had also collaborated with many notable artists such as Elton John, Catherine Lara, Sylvie Vartan and was notably a backing singer with Eurythmics in the 1980s (and subsequently also on the Dave Stewart-endorsed first Shakespears Sister album in 1989), and with Soma Riba in the 2000s.

== Personal life ==
Mother of two, Jamison has lived in France since 1980 after being invited by the French singer Sylvie Vartan, whom she met in the United States.

== Discography ==
=== Album ===
- 1990 : Life
- 1994 : Dream in Color
- 2007 : Nuances Gospel

=== Singles ===
- 1984 : "Polar" maxi single with Bernard Guyvan (Phil Barney and Debbie Davis)
- 1989 : "Joue pas" (in duo with François Feldman)
- 1991 : "J'ai peur" (in duo with François Feldman)
- 2004 : "A chance to Be Free" (on a music of Marc Kowalczyk)
