= Caroline Legrand =

- Born: Caroline Legrand
- Origin: France
- Genres: Pop music
- Occupation: Singer
- Years active: 1984–2007

Caroline Legrand (born 1970) is a 1980s French singer, primarily known for her 1989 hit "J'aurais voulu te dire".

== Musical career ==
She was recruited by the French singer François Feldman after being the first winner of the 'Tremplin de la chanson française' that the Parisian nightclub L'Orange Bleue organized.

In 1988, she recorded "J'aurais voulu te dire", a song which was composed by François Feldman and Jean-Marie Moreau. It featured on French Singles Chart (named Top 50 at the time) from 25 February to 17 June 1989, and reached number 6 for three weeks in April and May 1989. This hit was also certified Silver disc by the SNEP, the French certifier, for a minimum of 200,000 copies sold.

In 1992, she launched her first album, À Fleur de peau, containing "J'aurais voulu te dire" and her unsuccessful previous single.

In 1995, she released, under the slightly amended name of Karoline Legrand, Être ensemble, an album produced by Didier Barbelivien.

== Discography ==
=== Singles ===
As Caroline

- "Cool Raoul, Relax Max" (1984)

As Caroline Legrand

- "J'aurais voulu te dire" (1988)
- "Il fait planer ta vie" (1990)
- "Comme un Train qui roule" (1992)
- "Tant de solitude" (1992)

As Karoline Legrand

- "My Love" (1995)
- "Les Docks of the Bay" (1995)

As Zaya

- "Initiation of Love" (2004)

=== Albums ===
As Caroline Legrand

- À Fleur De Peau (1992)

As Karoline Legrand

- Être ensemble (1995)
