= Liane Foly =

French singer

- Born: Eliane Falliex; 16 January 1962 (age 63)
- Origin: Lyon, France
- Genres: Blues, Jazz, Pop
- Occupations: Singer-songwriter, Impressionist, Actress, Presenter
- Instrument: Vocalist
- Years active: 1984–present
- Labels: Virgin

Liane Foly (born 16 January 1962, in Lyon) is a popular French blues and jazz singer, actress, presenter and impressionist.

== Early years ==
Foly was born 16 December 1962 in the 7th arrondissement of Lyon. Her parents, a merchant family in French Algeria, returned to France in 1962 with the Pied-Noir community and moved to Lyon, near the Perrache quarter, where they owned La droguerie du sourire. As a child of five she practised dancing. At age 12, she sang with her parents' orchestra Black and White with her brother Philippe on the drums and her sister Corinne at the piano. Later she continued to sing in local night clubs and bars, developing an affinity for blues and jazz. She studied languages for her Baccalauréat and is bilingual in French and English.

Foly's brother is Philippe Falliex, a French composer for television and radio shows. He composed several of her songs and accompanied her on stage as a drummer.

== Career ==
In 1984, Foly was discovered by Philippe Viennet and André Manoukian, who offered to write and record a demo for her. After much work she arrived in Paris in 1987, and obtained a meeting with Fabrice Nataf, artistic director and CEO of Virgin France, who launched her career. She took on the name Liane Foly in 1986 in homage to Dalí, who at the time said in an advertisement that he was crazy about chocolate. In 1988, she published her first album, The Man I Love, promoted by the Ca va, ça vient single. It was a commercial success that landed in the top 50. The same year she performed on stage in Paris (La Cigale). The album was composed by André Manoukian, with lyrics written by Foly and Philippe Viennet. Her 1997 album, Caméléon, was Foly's first without André Manoukian. Produced by Philippe Viennet, it was largely ignored by the French public. She played a major part in the composition of her 2000 album, Entre nous.

== Discography ==
=== Albums ===
- Besoin de toi
- The Man I Love (Virgin, 1988)
- Rêve orange (Virgin, 1990)
- Les Petites Notes, recorded in English as Sweet Mystery (Virgin, 1990)
- Lumières (Virgin, 1994)
- Caméléon (Virgin, 1997)
- Acoustique (Virgin, 1998)
- Entre nous (Virgin, 2001)
- La chanteuse de bal (Up Music, 2004)
- Une étoile dort (Warner/(Up Music, 2005)
- Le goût du désir (Warner/LF Productions, 2008)
- Crooneuse (Sony, 2016)

=== Singles ===
- 1985 : Besoin de toi
- 1988 : Ca va, ca vient
- 1988 : Love me, love moi
- 1989 : Chéri
- 1990 : Au fur et à mesure
- 1991 : Goodbye Lover
- 1991 : Rêve Orange
- 1991 : Va savoir
- 1991 : S'en balancer
- 1991 : Les feuilles mortes
- 1992 : La belle et la bête (Ft Charles Aznavour)
- 1993 : Doucement
- 1993 : Laisse pleurer les nuages
- 1994 : J'irai tranquille
- 1994 : A trace of you
- 1994 : Sweet mystery
- 1994 : Les yeux doux
- 1994 : Voler la nuit
- 1994 : Jalna
- 1994 : Heures hindoues
- 1994 : La grande parade des animaux
- 1994 : J'ai le cœur en bois (Ft Yves Duteil)
- 1997 : C'est bon d'aimer
- 1997 : De l'autre côté du temps
- 1997 : L'amour est fort
- 1998 : Victoire
- 1999 : La vie ne m'apprend rien
- 1999 : Aime-moi
- 2000 : Il est mort le soleil
- 2000 : La chanson de Léa
- 2001 : On a tous le droit
- 2001 : Être vrai
- 2002 : Une place sur terre
- 2002 : Vivre
- 2004 : La chanteuse de bal
- 2005 : Déracinée
- 2005 : Une étoile dort
- 2008 : Reviens-moi
- 2008 : Ma vie sans toi
- 2011 : Colette
- 2016 : J'aime regarder les filles
- 2016 : C'est extra
- 2016 : La Boîte de Jazz
- 2016 : Voilà c'est fini

=== Soundtracks ===
- 1992 : Beauty and the Beast, La Belle et La Bête (Ft Charles Aznavour)
- 1994 : Jalna (TV series), generic
- 1995 : Sabrina, Les Petites Notes
- 2000 : La Bicyclette bleue (TV movie), La Chanson de Léa
- 2010 : What War May Bring, Du chaud dans tes bras, Que reste-t-il de nos amours, Cette fille-là & B comme Berlin

== Filmography ==
Year	Title	Role	Director	Notes
1995	Zadoc et le bonheur	Rose	Pierre-Henry Salfati	
2005	La battante	Cathy Rolland	Didier Albert	TV movie
2006	Navarro	Claude Derval	Philippe Davin	TV series (1 episode)
2007	Could This Be Love?	Jeanne Larozière	Pierre Jolivet	
2009	La liste	Anita Hochet	Christian Faure	TV movie
2009	R.I.S, police scientifique	Monica Verone	Christophe Barbier	TV series (1 episode)
2010	What War May Bring	The singer	Claude Lelouch	
2010	À 10 minutes de la plage	Rita	Stéphane Kappes	TV movie
2010	Josephine, Guardian Angel	Laura Calle	Philippe Monnier	TV series (1 episode)
2014	Ligne de mire	Aline Delmas	Nicolas Herdt	TV movie
2017	Everyone's Life	Eugénie Flora / Nini Jazzy	Claude Lelouch	

=== Dubbing ===
Year	Title	Role
2009	Boogie	Boogie
2009	The Princess and the Frog	Mama Odie

== Theater ==
Year	Title	Author	Director
2007–2009	La Folle Parenthèse	Liane Foly	Marc Jolivet
2011–2012	La Folle part en cure	Liane Foly	Marc Jolivet
2013	Jamais deux sans trois	Jean Franco	Jean-Luc Moreau

== Television ==
Year	Title	Channel	Notes
2007	Téléthon	France 2	Godmother
2007	Miss France	TF1	Jury
2008	Qui sera le meilleur ce soir ?	TF1	Host with Christophe Dechavanne
2010	Génération 90	TF1	Host with Nikos Aliagas
2010–2011	Le grand show des enfants	TF1	Host
2011	Génération 80	TF1	Host with Nikos Aliagas
2011	Génération 2000	TF1	Host with Nikos Aliagas
2011	Génération Tube de toujours	TF1	Host with Nikos Aliagas
2012	Génération 80	TF1	Host with Nikos Aliagas
2013	Un air de star	M6	Jury
2016	SuperKids	M6 / W9	Jury
2019	Danse avec les stars	TF1	Contestant

== Radio ==
Year	Title	Channel
2017–2018	Les Grosses Têtes	RTL
2007–2008	Chacun sa Foly	Sud Radio

== Other work ==
- Since 1993, she is a member of Les Enfoirés, a union of artists who sing every year at a charity concert for the association the Restaurants du Cœur.
- Since 1995, part of proceeds from her two albums went to AIDS charities.
- Since 2006, she has worked for AFIPA, an organization fighting the commercialisation of pet animal furs (dogs and cats).
- In 2007, she is the godmother of the TV Show "Téléthon" and the non-profit organisation Make a Wish (Belgium).
- In 2013, she is the godmother of the France women's national football team.
