= Les Petites Notes =

Les Petites Notes is a 1993 album by French singer Liane Foly, and her break-out album. After selling 400,000 copies in less than a year in France the album was adapted by Tim Rice and Peter Kingsbury and re-engineered for international release in 25 markets by Sade's producer Mike Pela under the English title "Sweet Mystery.

== Singles ==
The 1993 single from the album, the song "Doucement", was composed by Foly with André Manoukian and Lorenz Viennet. This was initially recorded with Jean-Marc Benaïs, Gilles Coquard, Pierre Drevet, Liane Foly, Carole Fredericks and Richard Galliano, and re-recorded for the 1999 Acoustique album with Theos Allen, Philippe Falliex, Hervé Gourdikian, Eric Legnini, Nick Moroch and Mike Robinson.

== Track list ==
=== Les Petites Notes (1993) ===
1. Les Faux Soleils
2. Doucement
3. Voler la Nuit
4. Les Parfums d'Autrefois
5. Laisse Pleurer Les Nuages
6. Une Larme de Bonheur
7. La Marelle
8. J'Irai Tranquille
9. Passe le Temps
10. Les Yeux Doux
11. Les Petites Notes

=== Sweet Mystery (1995) ===
1. A trace of you (doucement)
2. Sweet mystery
3. When you smile
4. Les parfums d'autrefois
5. Voler la nuit
6. Tell me why
7. Tear of desire
8. No sweat
9. Who knows why
10. Anywhere anyplace anytime
11. Au fur et à mesure
12. Les petites notes
