= J'ai peur =

1991 single by François Feldman and Joniece Jamison

Single by François Feldman and Joniece Jamison

from the album Une Présence
- B-side: "Instrumental"
- Released: January 1991
- Recorded: 1989
- Studio: Studio Musika (recording); Studio Musika (mixing); Top Master (mastering)
- Genre: Dance-pop, eurodance, europop
- Length: 3:40
- Label: Big Bang, Phonogram (France); Metronome (Germany)
- Songwriter(s): Jean-Marie Moreau, François Feldman
- Producer(s): Fred Fraikin, Jean Fredenucci, Guy Walker

François Feldman and Joniece Jamison singles chronology
"Petit Frank" (1990)	"J'ai peur" (1991)	"Le serpent qui danse" (1991)

"J'ai peur" (transl. French for "I'm Afraid") is a 1989 song recorded as a duet by French and American singers François Feldman and Joniece Jamison. Written by Jean-Marie Moreau with a music by Feldman, this dance-pop song was released in February 1991 and became the fifth single from Feldman's 1989 Diamond-awarded album Une Présence. As the previous singles from the album, it was a successful top ten hit, though it was the less-selling one.

The song was included on Feldman's three best of compilations: first on Two Feldman (1996), then on Best Feldman (1998), and last on Gold (2008); it was also performed during Feldman's 1991 tour and was thus included on the live album Feldman à Bercy (1992).

== Critical reception ==
When reviewing the new singles releases, Music & Media stated that "J'ai peur" "creates the kind of international unity that politicians around the world can only dream of. It's also more danceable than any United Nations Resolution".

== Charts performance ==
In France, "J'ai peur" debuted at number 41 on the chart edition of 23 February 1991, then performed the biggest jump of the week to reach number 24 and eventually peaked at number seven in its fifth week; however, it only stayed for two weeks in the top ten and totalled 19 weeks in the top 50. In spite of this lower peak position than those of the previous singles, it allowed Feldman to record what was at that time a feat on the French Singles Chart: he thus became the second artist - after Elsa Lunghini and her 1988 eponymous album - to obtain five top ten hit singles from a same album, a feat later broken by Michael Jackson with his album Dangerous, which provided seven top ten hits.

"J'ai peur" entered the European Hot 100 Singles at number 84 on 16 March 1991, reached a peak of number 31 three weeks later, and remained for non consecutive 14 weeks on the chart. It was regularly played on radio, reaching number 29 on the European Airplay Top 50 on 4 May 1991, and charted for a total of eight weeks.

== Track listings ==
- 7" single
1. "J'ai peur" — 3:40
2. "J'ai peur" (instrumental) — 3:50
- 12" maxi
1. "J'ai peur" (12" version) — 6:45
2. "J'ai peur" (instrumental) — 6:05
- CD maxi - France
1. "J'ai peur (I'm Afraid)" (12" version) — 6:45
2. "J'ai peur (Don't Play with Me)" (unreleased track) — 6:38
3. "J'ai peur (I'm Afraid)" (7" version) — 3:40
- CD maxi - Germany
1. "J'ai peur (I'm Afraid)" (12" version) — 6:45
2. "J'ai peur (I'm Afraid)" (instrumental) — 6:05
3. "J'ai peur (I'm Afraid)" (single version) — 3:40

== Personnel ==
- Backing vocals – Didier Makaga
- Bass – Patrice Sokolsky
- Drums – Daniel Spitale
- Graphic Design – Huart / Cholley
- Guitar – Kamil Rustam
- Keyboards, programmation – Thierry Durbet
- Mastering – André Perillat
- Mixing – Dominique Blanc-Francard
- Photography – Bernard Matussière, Gilles Cappé
- Recording – Nicolas Garin
- Saxophone – Patrick Bourgoin
- Trombone – Alex Perdigon
- Trumpet – Kako Bessot

== Charts ==
Chart (1991)	Peak position
Europe (European Airplay Top 50)	29
Europe (European Hot 100)	31
France (SNEP)	7
Portugal (UNEVA)	10
Quebec (ADISQ)	14

== Release history ==
Country	Date	Format	Label
France	1991	7" single	Big Bang, Phonogram
France	1991	12" maxi	Big Bang, Phonogram
France	1991	CD maxi	Big Bang, Phonogram
Germany	1991	7" single	Metronome
Germany	1991	12" maxi	Metronome
Germany	1991	CD maxi	Metronome
