= Slave (François Feldman song) =

1988 single by François Feldman

Single by François Feldman

from the album Vivre, Vivre
- B-side: "Encore plus belle endormie"
- Released: December 1987
- Recorded: 1986
- Studio: Studio Musika, Paris
- Genre: Pop
- Length: 3:36
- Label: Phonogram, Big Bang
- Songwriters: Jean-Marie Moreau, François Feldman, Thierry Durbet
- Producers: Fred Fraikin, Jean Fredenucci, Guy Walker

François Feldman singles chronology
"Demain c'est toi" (1987)	"Slave" (1987)	"Je te retrouverai" (1988)

"Slave" is a 1986 song recorded by French singer François Feldman. It was written by Jean-Marie Moreau, Thierry Durbet and Feldman and was released in December 1987 as the third single from the album Vivre, Vivre, released earlier in the same year, on which it appears as the second track. It provided Feldman first top five hit in France.

The song was included on Feldman's three best of compilations: first on Two Feldman (1996) on which it appears as the third track on the second CD, then on Best Feldman (1998) as the twelfth track, last on Gold (2008) as the third track on the second CD; it was also performed during Feldman's 1991 tour and was thus included on the live album Feldman à Bercy (1992).

== Chart performance ==
In France, "Slave" debuted at number 43 on the chart edition of 16 January 1988, reached the top ten five weeks later, peaked at number five in its eleventh week, totalled eight weeks in the top ten and fell off the top 50 after 20 weeks. It achieved Silver status, awarded by the Syndicat National de l'Édition Phonographique, the French certificator, for over 250,000 units sold. On the European Hot 100 Singles, it started at number 92 on 13 February 1988, peaked at number 17 in its ninth week, and spent 16 weeks on the chart.

== Track listings ==
- 7" single
1. "Slave" — 3:36
2. "Encore plus belle endormie" — 3:00
- 12" maxi
1. "Slave" (remix) — 5:15
2. "Slave" — 3:36
3. "Encore plus belle endormie" — 3:00
- CD maxi
1. "Slave" — 3:36
2. "Amour de corridor" — 3:59
3. "Encore plus belle endormie" — 3:00
4. "Slave" (remix) — 5:15

== Charts and sales ==
=== Weekly charts ===
Chart (1988)	Peak position
Europe (European Hot 100)	17
France (SNEP)	5

=== Year-end charts ===
Chart (1988)	Position
Europe (Eurochart Hot 100)	92

=== Certifications ===
Certifications for "Slave"
Region	Certification	Certified units/sales
France (SNEP)	Silver	250,000^{*}
^{*} Sales figures based on certification alone.

== Release history ==
Country	Date	Format	Label
France	1987	7" single	Big Bang, Phonogram
France	1987	12" maxi	Big Bang, Phonogram
France	1988	CD maxi	Big Bang, Phonogram
Canada	1988	7" single	Big Bang, Philips
