= Les Valses de Vienne =

1989 single by François Feldman

Single by François Feldman

from the album Une Présence
- B-side: Instrumental (vinyl); "Longue Nuit", "Pour faire tourner le monde" (CD maxi)
- Released: 23 November 1989
- Recorded: France, 1989
- Genre: Pop
- Length: 3:56
- Label: Phonogram
- Songwriters: François Feldman; Jean-Marie Moreau
- Producer: Jean Fredenucci

François Feldman singles chronology
"Joue pas" (1989)	"Les Valses de Vienne" (1989)	"C'est toi qui m'as fait" (1990)

"Les Valses de Vienne" is a 1989 song originally recorded by the French artist François Feldman for his 1989 album, Une Présence and was the second singles release from that album in November of the same year. It achieved great success in France, topping the chart for six nonconsecutive weeks, and remains Feldman's signature song and a classic of 1980s French music. It was also included on the singer's three best of compilations: Two Feldman (1996), Best Feldman (1998) and Gold (2008); it was also performed during Feldman's 1991 tour and was thus included on the live album Feldman à Bercy (1992).

== Lyrics, music and video ==
The lyrics were written and the music composed by Feldman himself and the songwriter Jean-Marie Moreau. According to the expert of French chart Elia Habib, the song is a "romantic ballad, whose identity remains a salve savour in the subject as well as in the musical coloration". The song is based on a pun and all the text is declined as well, juggling with the likeness and the consonance of terms between them (e.g. "dans la Rome antique, errent les romantiques"). The part played by the violins was written by Thierry Durbet.

The music video features Feldman with a young girl who portrayed his daughter and who tries to comfort her father because he is separated from her mother. The cover on the CD maxi and vinyls is a screenshot from the video.

== Chart performance ==
In France, "Les Valses de Vienne" started at number 38 on the chart edition of 23 November 1989, climbed regularly and entered the top ten three weeks later. It was blocked for three weeks at number two by Roch Voisine's hit "Hélène", then reached number one for four weeks, then was dislodged by "Hélène" for two weeks, and eventually returned atop for additional two weeks. Then it almost did not stop to drop and fell off the top 50 after 23 weeks, and achieved Gold status awarded by the Syndicat National de l'Édition Phonographique. In 2003, the French TV program Top 50: 50 numéros 1 de légende revealed that the song was the 26th best received number-one hit of the SNEP Singles Chart thanks to the votings of the TV viewers.

== Track listings ==
- 7" single
1. "Les Valses de Vienne" — 3:56
2. "Les Valses de Vienne" (instrumental) — 4:02
- 7" maxi
1. "Les Valses de Vienne" (extended version) — 5:08
2. "Les Valses de Vienne" — 4:02
- CD maxi
1. "Les Valses de Vienne" (single version) — 3:56
2. "Longue nuit" — 4:39
3. "Pour faire tourner le monde" — 3:50
4. "Les Valses de Vienne" (instrumental) — 4:02

== Credits ==
- Produced by Jean Fredenucci for Big Bang
- Mixed by Dominique Blanc-Francard
- Editions: Marilu Music / Carole Line, 1989 Phonogram
- Photos: Claude Gassian / Thierry Bouêt
- Design: Antonietti / Pascault & Ass.

== Charts ==
=== Weekly charts ===
Weekly chart performance for "Les Valses de Vienne"
Chart (1989–1990)	Peak position
Europe (European Airplay Top 50)	28
Europe (European Hot 100)	5
France (SNEP)	1
Quebec (ADISQ)	33

=== Year-end charts ===
Year-end chart performance for "Les Valses de Vienne"
Chart (1990)	Position
Europe (Eurochart Hot 100)	27

=== Certifications ===
Certifications for "Les Valses de Vienne"
Region	Certification	Certified units/sales
France (SNEP)	Gold	400,000^{*}
^{*} Sales figures based on certification alone.

== See also ==
- List of number-one singles of 1990 (France)
