= Restaurants du Cœur =

French nonprofit organization

Organisation logo

The Restaurants du Cœur (literally Restaurants of the Heart but meaning Restaurants of Love), commonly known as the Restos du Cœur, is a French charity founded by comedian Coluche (1944–1986) and its main activity is to distribute food packages and hot meals to those in need.

The association targets the homeless and those with of low income (single families, elderly people with a low pension, young adults, etc.). The association also helps people to find housing and supports other projects. This not-for-profit association has the "reconnu d'utilité publique" (recognised as being of public interest) status which exempts it from specific taxes. The association had 66,000 volunteers in 2015 and is known for its yearly Les Enfoirés fundraising concert.

== History ==
Comedian and actor Coluche launched the idea of the Restos du Cœur on 26 September 1985: "I have a little idea, a bit like this... If there are people who would be interested in sponsoring a free soup kitchen, we'd start first in Paris and then spread to France's big cities." The first Resto du Cœur opened on 21 December ahead of Christmas and soon multiplied all over the country. The goal of the founders was to give away 2,000 to 3,000 meals per day; 8.5 million meals were distributed in the first winter alone. In 2018, 130 million meals were served.

The initiative was supported by a song written by the songwriter and singer Jean-Jacques Goldman called les Restos du cœur, which included some of the lyrics being sung or read out by other celebrities. A televised show allowed the organisation to collect several million francs.

Coluche pleaded for the Restos' cause at the European Parliament in February 1986 after learning that surplus products cost more to store than to distribute free to the poor; his plea was heard and in 1987 the surplus was made available to four organisations.

== Operation ==
=== Structure and Organisation ===
The Restos du Cœur consists of one national organisation and 119 departmental organisations.

==== The National Organisation ====
Founded by the comedian and actor Coluche in 1985, "Les Restos du Cœur - Relais du Cœur" is a voluntary association as defined by the French association law of 1901. Recognised as being of public interest, its goal is to help the neediest and to fight social marginalisation.

It is a founding member of the Committee of the Charter of Deontology of Social and Humanitarian Organisations, a group of associations committed to financial transparency. It owns the name and logo of the Restos du Cœur.

Every year, the general assembly elects its governing body, which in turn chooses the president and the board from its members. The board enacts the policy of the Restos, as defined by the general assembly, at weekly meetings. The national organisation's goals are:

- to centralise purchases of food and to supply it to the departments;
- to encourage the departmental organisations to be involved in the reintegration of their beneficiaries into society, and to support them in their endeavours using technical and financial support;
- to ensure the training of volunteers;
- to oversee, using policy officers, the consistency of their messages;
- to control and consolidate the accounts of the departmental organisations, to look after their well-being, and to ensure their respect for the rules;
- and to maintain communication between the Restos.

==== The Departmental Branches ====
The 113 departmental organisations can be found throughout 96 departments. Although they are legally autonomous, they operate using the same principles as the national organisation (general assemblies, governing bodies, boards), and are bound to them by a contractual agreement.

The departmental organisations manage, activate and coordinate activities on the ground with 40,000 volunteers in almost 2,500 Restos, which together welcome 600,000 beneficiaries a day. Their aims are to provide food aid, lodging, workshops (such as the Jardins du Cœur - "Gardens of the Heart") and cultural activities.

All these reintegration programmes exist to help beneficiaries to become normal citizens. Under the heading of "reinsertion into society" are several different kinds of activities:

- from workshops to gardens;
- from trucks doing nightly rounds in the big cities to long-term lodging solutions;
- and from cultural activities to picnics.

Though the soup kitchens remain the most visible face of the Restos, they alone cannot ease the exclusion of those benefiting from their existence. Reinsertion is therefore considered top priority.

The "Les Restos demain" ("The Restos Tomorrow") survey, which polled more than 13,000 beneficiaries and volunteers in 1998 and 1999, confirmed the need to evolve and reinforced the will to extend the beneficiary-volunteer partnership.

=== A Need for Clarity ===
The Restos du Cœur are attentive to the good use of the funds. As an organisation essentially financed by private donors, public funds and public organisations, and with its activities carried out by volunteers, its overheads are generally very low (around 8% of resources) and unnecessary expenses are eliminated. Invitations to tender ensure that best value for money is obtained. Consequently, 90% of financial resources are devoted to activities.

In line with the organisation's legislation, the accounts of the organisation are inspected by auditors. Occasional discrepancies by some local groups are sanctioned and transmitted to the courts.

Voted on and passed in 1988, the loi Coluche ("Coluche law") permits small donors (the largest segment of funders) to benefit from the same tax breaks as big donors. A later amendment permits donors to get a tax break of 75% for donations up to €470. Above that, and within a limit of 20% of income, the tax break is 66%. Each donor receives a tax form on which an accountant confirms all the necessary calculations for the tax break, and a document stating how the money donated will be used by the Restos.

Since 1987, the Restos du Cœur have benefited financially from the European Plan to Help the Neediest (Plan européen d'aide aux plus démunis, or PEAD).

== The People ==
=== Donors ===
There are various ways people can contribute to the Restos du Cœur:

- Individual financial donations
- Offering services (loan of buildings, transport, printing...) or participating in authorised protests, which are strictly regulated financially and legally.
- Purchasing an Enfoirés CD (les Enfoirés - "The Tossers" or "The Bastards" in English - is the name of an annual concert to raise money for the cause), bequeathing goods or money, or giving up copyright over a work.
- Donating goods (books, clothes, food, hygiene products...).

However, the following are all forbidden:

- fundraising or garage sales;
- commercial operations without the consent of the Restos du Cœur;
- and direct mailing canvassing financial donations, apart from those from the organisation itself.

=== Volunteers ===
The first campaign for the Restos du Cœur in 1985 netted 5,000 volunteers. Today, there are more than 63,000 of all backgrounds with one point in common: generosity devoid of political or religious points of view. Their actions are based on the Volunteers' Charter, whose six guiding points guarantee the good working order of the organisation. To fulfil their mission well, each volunteer undergoes a training period enabling them to learn the techniques necessary for their mission. Two professional trainers and some experienced volunteers give seminars where volunteers from all around France gather. Classes about the following subjects are held:

- managing a Resto;
- welcoming people who no longer try for or want to get help;
- accompanying those who ask for moral support;
- helping those who have trouble paying rent on the homes they have finally found;
- and teaching at a workshop or a garden.

=== Artists ===
Coluche knew that the best way he could help the Restos was to present his own image and those of his friends. In one winter, he created the Enfoirés around this idea.

On 26 January 1986, Coluche presented a show on national television that lasted all afternoon. An exceptional group of people gathered together: politicians of all stripes, presenters from all the TV channels and radio stations, and all kinds of artists and sports stars.

Since then, every year an Enfoirés concert has been held to encourage people to donate to the Restos du Cœur. It has become a very popular event. Each year, the media explain the goals of the organisation and remind people of where they can donate or volunteer. The Enfoirés themselves support the Restos by giving up the profits from the concerts and albums of these concerts.

There was also a charity song about it on TF1 (2012 appel aux dons spot), beautifully accompanied with the music of the Spanish band PLOU .

== The Restos abroad ==
=== Belgium: 1986 ===
There are 16 Restos in Belgium: 12 in Wallonia, two in Flanders and two in Brussels. Coluche inaugurated the first one, in Liège, on 22 February 1986. It was immediately decided to leave it open all year long, and as elsewhere, the services provided were quickly swamped.

The Belgian Federation of Restos currently offers many services (social, legal, reinsertion...), and help (administrative, financial, medical, lodging...).

=== Germany: 1997 ===
One can also find Restaurant des Herzens in Germany, specifically in Erfurt and Leipzig.

In Erfurt, there is a cultural programme with theatre and music, and even a Father Christmas for the children. In 2004, however, dwindling donations resulted in reduced opening hours.

In Leipzig, the beneficiaries have to pay 50 euro cents per meal, otherwise the distribution of food would be impossible to finance. Nevertheless, a free minibus service operates between the central railway station and the restaurant.
