= François Feldman =

French singer

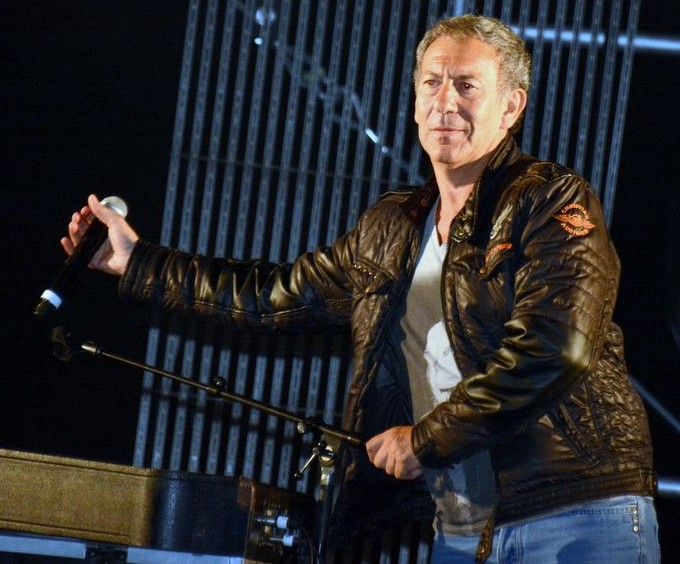
- Feldman in 2013.

Background information
- Birth name: François Feldman
- Born: 23 May 1958 (age 66)
- Origin: France
- Genres: Pop music
- Occupation(s): Singer, songwriter
- Years active: 1980–present

François Feldman (French: [fʁɑ̃swa fɛldman]; born 23 May 1958) is a French singer. He had a great success in the 1980s and the 1990s in France.

== Biography ==
The young François Feldman spent his adolescence listening to soul music, including songs by Marvin Gaye, Stevie Wonder and James Brown, among other artists. His father gave him his first guitar at 14 and François won first prize several times in the radio contests he entered. He also created his first group at 14 and appeared in a few clubs. In 1980, Feldman recorded his first song, "You Want Every Night", then "Ma Petite Vidéo" in 1982, "Folle sur les bords" in the summer of 1983, "Wally boule noire" and "Obsession" in 1984, and finally "Amour de corridor" in 1985, but all these singles remained unsuccessful.

In 1986, he became famous with his song "Rien que pour toi" which reached number 12 on the SNEP Singles Chart and sold 200,000 units. Thereafter, Feldman had many hits in France, becoming a well established star in France. He has sold very well over his 25-year career, selling about 10 million albums in several countries, including Belgium, Italy, Canada and Japan.

Released in 1989, his second studio album entitled Une Présence was more successful and contains several hit singles, such as "Joue pas", recorded as a duet with Joniece Jamison, "Les Valses de Vienne", "Petit Frank" and "C'est toi qui m'as fait" which were all top-2 hits in France. The same year, he wrote the hit single "J'aurais voulu te dire" for Caroline Legrand. This album was followed by Magic Boul'vard, released in 1991, and provided to Feldman a third number one hit in France, "Joy", a song dedicated to the singer's daughter.

Since 1993, and his album Indigo, Feldman has been less successful and unable to repeat his previous success on the charts. Despite releasing four albums, he has been almost absent from the media and his sales have been modest. He currently continues his artistic career giving popular concerts throughout France.

In 2007, "Rien que pour toi" was covered by Tatiana Laurens who took part in the French TV reality show Secret Story.

== Discography ==
=== Albums ===
Studio albums

- 1987 : Vivre vivre – #9
- 1989 : Une Présence – #2
- 1991 : Magic Boul'vard – #4
- 1993 : Indigo – #13
- 1995 : À contre-jour
- 1997 : Couleurs d'origine – #65
- 2004 : Des Larmes et de l'Amour – #132

Live albums

- 1992 : Bercy 92 – #5

Compilations

- 1996 : Two Feldman – #2
- 2008 : Gold

=== Singles ===
- 1982 : "You Want Every Night"
- 1982 : "Ma Petite Vidéo"
- 1983 : "Folle sur les bords"
- 1984 : "Wally boule noire"
- 1984 : "Obsession"
- 1985 : "Amour de corridor"
- 1986 : "Rien que pour toi" – #12
- 1987 : "Demain c'est toi"
- 1988 : "Slave" – #5
- 1988 : "Je te retrouverai" – #19
- 1989 : "Le Mal de toi" – #9
- 1989 : "Joue pas" – #2
- 1989 : "Les Valses de Vienne" – #1
- 1990 : "C'est toi qui m'as fait" – #2
- 1990 : "Petit Frank" – #1
- 1991 : "J'ai peur" – #7
- 1991 : "Le serpent qui danse" – #15
- 1991 : "Magic' Boul'vard" – #12
- 1992 : "Joy – #1
- 1992 : "Tombé d'amour" – #8
- 1992 : "Existe" (live) – #45
- 1993 : "Elle est bien trop belle"
- 1994 : "Fais tomber la pluie"
- 1994 : "Le P'tit Cireur"
- 1995 : "Destination" – #49
- 1995 : "Exit de la nuit"
- 1996 : "Comme un film"
- 1997 : "J'aurais voulu te dire" – #41
- ? : "Evadée du volcan"
- ? : "Les Violons tziganes"
- ? : "Tes Désirs"
