= Pow woW =

French musical group

- Origin: France
- Genres: French pop, a cappella
- Labels: Mercury, Universal, WEA
- Members: Alain Chennevière; Ahmed Mouici; Pascal Periz; Bertrand Pierre
- Website: Pow woW Unofficial site

Pow woW is a French musical group, mainly performing doo-wop inspired a capella songs. Their biggest hit was "Le Chat" in 1992. Their next single was the French version of song "The Lion Sleeps Tonight", titled "Le lion est mort ce soir".

== Members ==
- Alain Chennevière
- Ahmed Mouici
- Pascal Periz
- Bertrand Pierre
- David Mignonneau (as replacement of Bertrand Pierre since 2005)
- Yvo Abadi (drums)

== Discography ==
=== Albums ===
- Regagner les plaines (1992)
- Comme un guetteur (1993) - Mercury
- Pow woW (1995)
- Quatre (Best of) (1995) - Universal
- Chanter (2006) - WEA

=== Compilations ===
- Master série (1998)
