= Les Enfoirés =

Name of performers in French charity concert

Background information
- Origin: France
- Genres: Chanson, pop
- Years active: 1986–present
- Members: Les Enfoirés (participants)

Les Enfoirés (French: [lez‿ɑ̃fwaʁe], "The Tossers" or "The Bastards") is the name given to the singers and performers in the yearly charity concert for the Restaurants du Cœur. Founded at the initiative of Coluche in 1986, a year after the Restaurants du Cœur, its first concert was held in 1989.

== Discography ==
=== Albums ===
Year	Album	Peak positions		
Year	Album	FRA	BEL (Wa)	SWI
1989	Tournée d'Enfoirés	—	—	—
1990	Jean d'Enfoires	__	__	__
1991	Petit des enfoires	__	__	__
1992	La soirée des Enfoirés à L'opéra	—	—	—
1993	Les Enfoirés chantent Starmania	—	—	—
1994	Les Enfoirés au Grand Rex	—	—	—
1995	Les Enfoirés à l'Opéra-Comique	—	—	—
1996	La soirée des Enfoirés	3	—	—
1997	Le zénith des Enfoirés	6	11	—
1998	Enfoirés en cœur	2	—	—
1999	Dernière édition avant l'an 2000	2	6	31
2000	Enfoirés en 2000	1	1	6
2001	2001: L'odyssée des Enfoirés	1	1	2
2002	2002: Tous dans le même bateau	1	1	3
2003	2003: La foire aux Enfoirés	1	1	2
2004	2004: Les Enfoirés dans l'espace	1	1	3
2005	2005: Le train des Enfoirés	1	1	1
2006	2006: Le village des Enfoirés	1	1	1
2007	2007: La caravane des Enfoirés	1	1	2
2008	2008: Les secrets des Enfoirés	1	1	2
2009	2009: Les Enfoirés font leur cinéma	1	1	2
2010	2010: Les Enfoirés... la crise de nerfs!	1	1	2
2011	2011: Dans l'œil des Enfoirés	1	1	1
2012	2012: Le bal des Enfoirés	1	1	2
2013	La boîte à musique des Enfoirés	1	1	2
2014	Bon anniversaire les Enfoirés	1	1	1
2015	2015: Sur la route des Enfoirés	1	1	1
2016	2016: Au rendez-vous des Enfoirés	1	1	1
2017	2017: Mission Enfoirés	1	1	2
2018	2018: Musique !	1	1	1
2019	2019: Le monde des Enfoirés	1	1	1
2020	2020: Le Pari(s) des Enfoirés	1	1	1
2021	2021: Les Enfoirés à côté de vous	1	1	1
2022	2022: Un air d'Enfoirés	1	2	3
2023	2023: Enfoirés un jour, toujours	1	1	1
2024	2024: On a 35 ans!	1	1	1
2025	2025: Au pays des Enfoirés	1	1	1
2026	2026: La ballade des Enfoirés	1	1	3

Live

Year	Album	Peak positions		
Year	Album	FRA	BEL (Wa)	SWI
2000	Tournée d'Enfoirés	61	—	—
2000	Les Enfoirés au Grand Rex	72	—	—
2000	À l'opéra comique	67	15	—

Compilations

Year	Album	Peak positions		
Year	Album	FRA	BEL (Wa)	SWI
2011	Le meilleur des Enfoirés - 20 ans	24	1	4
2011	Le meilleur des Enfoirés - 20 ans / 2011: Dans l'oeil des Enfoirés	58	68	—
2017	2017: Génération Enfoirés	7	18	15
2019	2019: Les 30 ans des Enfoirés	—	17	13

=== Singles and charting songs ===
(Selective, charting singles)

Year	Album	Peak positions		
Year	Album	FRA	BEL (Wa)	SWI
1992	"L'auvergnat"	20		
1993	"Le monde est stone"	11		
1995	"On ira tous au paradis" (live)	28	28	
1997	"Sauver l'amour"	48		
1998	Bienvenue chez moi (Enfoirés en cœur)	59		
1999	"Emmenez-moi"	38	13* (Ultratip)	
2000	"Chanter"	38		
2006	"Le temps qui court"	4	2	19
2007	"Aimer à perdre la raison"	–	22	–
2008	"L'amitié"	–	7	–
2009	"Ici les Enfoirés"	–	1	29
2009	"Toi + moi" (with Maurane, Le Forestier, Keim, Darmon, Zenatti, De Palmas, Foly, Leroy)	187	16	–
2009	"Amoureuse" (St Pier, Willem, Segara, Aubert)	–	28	–
2009	"Je n'attendais que vous" (Maé, Lara, Maurane, Bruel, La Chorale des Voisins du Dessus)	–	29	–
2009	"Une petite cantate" (Keim, Bénabar, Jenifer, Raphaël)	–	38	–
2010	"Si l'on s'aimait, si"	–	4	54
2010	"Parce que c'est toi" (Grégoire / Zazie / Bruel / St-Pier)	–	30	–
2010	"Ta main" (with Mathy / Luce / Zazie / Maurane / MC Solaar)	–	37	–
2011	"On demande pas la lune"	8	9	37
2011	"Octobre" (Maé, Segara, Lama, Maurane)	–	49	–
2011	"Écris l'histoire" (Noah, Keim, Maurane)	93	49	–
2011	"Un jour de plus au paradis"	–	35* (Ultratip)	–
2012	"Encore un autre hiver"	10	4	63
2012	"Je te promets" (with Keim / Bruel / Alizée / Aubert)	62	40	–
2012	"Without You" (Nolwenn Leroy / Fiori / Badi / Obispo)	91	49	–
2012	"Je suis de celles / Les bals populaires"	104	–	–
2012	"C'est bientôt la fin"	137	–	–
2012	"Entre nous"	171	–	–
2012	"L'horloge tourne"	178	–	–
2012	"Attention au départ"	5	3	49
2013	"Jeanne" (with Willem / Nolwenn Leroy / M. Pokora / Maé / Lorie / Maurane / L'Orchestre Ostinato)	44	25	–
2013	"Someone Like You" (with Maurane / Bent / Badi / Zaz)	55	43	–
2013	"Donne-moi le temps" (Segara / St Pier / Keim / Alizée / L'Orchestre Ostinato)	99	45	–
2013	"Place des grands hommes" (with Maé / Obispo / Laroque / Renan Luce)	95	–	–
2013	"Ma direction" (M. Pokora / Fiori / Maunier / Goldman / Badi / Mathy / Laroque / Thomas Dutronc / Nolwenn Leroy / Bruel / Garou)	125	–	–
2013	"Morgane de toi" (Zazie / Thomas Dutronc / Aubert / Grégoire / Les Petites Mains Symphoniques)	154	–	–
2013	"C'est moi" (Bruel / Bent / Aubert / Grégoire / M Pokora / Goldman)	160	–	–
2013	"Attention au départ"	183	3	49
2014	"La chanson du bénévole"	22	14	–
2014	"A quoi ça sert l'amour" (live) (Lavoine / Zazie / Mathy / MC Solaar / Ségara / Les Enfoirés / Chœurs du Collège du Kochersberg)	105	–	–
2014	"Seras-tu là?" (live) (Le Forestier / Ségara / Thomas Dutronc / Badi / Moire / Lââm / Foly / Grégoire / Clerc)	126	–	–
2014	"Noir et blanc" (live) (with Bruel / Maé / Aubert / Maunier)	181	–	–
2014	"Laissez-nous chanter" (live) (Goldman / Fiori / Clerc / Youn / Lorie / Laroque / Foly / Tal / Ségara / St-Pier / Nolwenn Leroy / Zazie)	196	–	–
2015	"Toute la vie"	16	21	–
2016	"Liberté"	34	3* (Ultratip)	–
2017	"Juste une p'tite chanson"	37	1* (Ultratip)	–
2018	"On fait le show"	–	49	–
2019	"On trace"	–	32	–
2020	"A côté de toi"	66	9	–
2021	"Maintenant"	–	6	–
2022	"Il y aura toujours un rendez-vous"	–	25	–
2023	"Rêvons"	–	16	–
2024	"Jusqu'au dernier"	–	46	–
2025	"Le monde demain"	–	58	–
2026	"Tout se casse"	–	62	–
2026	"L’île aux trésors"	–	59	–

*Did not appear in the official Belgian Ultratop 50 charts, but rather in the bubbling under Ultratip charts.
