= Hervé Hubert =

French TV producer

Hervé Hubert is a French TV producer who is one of the most important producers of game shows and real TV competitions in France.

== Career ==
Hubert graduated from Paris Business School, l'École Supérieure de Commerce de Paris (ESCP), he began his career by producing French humorists like Thierry Le Luron, Sim, Benoît Poelvoorde, Francis Perrin, Vincent Lagaf'. He also produced lighthearted songs which have been strong hits in France and have marked the '90s in France: Bo Le Lavabo, La Zoubida, and La Simca 1000.

Since 1994, Hervé Hubert has been producing TV shows, mainly game shows and reality competition TV shows. He produced more than 6,000 TV shows, including the French adaptations of some famous formats like Let's Make a Deal, Wheel of Fortune, Deal or No Deal or The Price is Right.

In 2006, he initiated the comeback on air of famous old formats when he proposed to TF1 a revival of Wheel of Fortune, which had not been on air in France for 10 years.

After selling his company to Endemol in the early 2000s, Hubert left the group in 2008.

Since August 2009, he has been co-producing with FremantleMedia France a revival of The Price is Right for TF1 in daily access prime time. This new adaptation of the format was an instant tremendous hit in France, the first episode being watched by more than 7.3 million viewers in access prime time, with a record share of 38.7% on 4+ viewers, of 45.8% on housewives less than 50, and 56.9% on viewers aged 15–24.

He is also co-producing with FremantleMedia France the game show Million Dollar Password in access prime time for public broadcaster FRANCE 2.

Since 2013, he is also producing "Les Reines du shopping", the French adaptation of the daily format Shopping Queens. The 2-week pilot of this shopping competition was an amazing rating success and M6 commissioned more than 1000 episodes since then.

Since February 2015, Hervé Hubert is also co-producing with A Prime Group the game show "Joker" for France 2.

In 2016, the company taped a new adaptation of the format "Shopping Queens" which is an instant hit on M6. "Make-up Queens" is also on air on M6 app 6Play.

Hervé Hubert launched in 2016 the format "Beauty Express" during MIPTV, distributed by Global Agency.

In October 2016, Hervé Hubert launched during the MIPCOM in Cannes a new format "My Wife Rules" which became an international instant success. The format aired in France every day at 5:00 pm since February 2017 on France 2. It is on air in Brazil, Greece and Algeria, and is already optioned in many countries (Germany, Italy, Russia, Spain, Finland, Poland...).

In May 2018, Hervé Hubert launched at MIPTV a new format: "Fashion Auction", distributed by Global Agency, that has already been commissioned by M6.

In November 2019, Hervé Hubert produced for TF1 the entertainment show Mask Singer every Friday in prime time. The show was a huge ratings success, being the biggest launch for TF1 since The Voice in 2012, with 7.3 million viewers, amazing market shares of 32.8% on all viewers, 48.3% on housewives aged 15–49, 60% on kids aged 4–14, and 58% on viewers aged 15–24.

== Shows produced ==
Hervé Hubert produced more than 7,000 TV shows, among which :

- Mask Singer, on TF1 in prime time, since November 2019
- Fashion Auction, hosted by Cristina Cordula, on M6 since in access prime time
- Chéri(e) c'est moi le Chef ! (the first cooking show in couple), (My wife rules), on air since February 2017 every day at 5 pm on France 2, hosted by Grégory Cohen and co-produced with A Prime Group,
- Les Rois du Shopping, (Shopping Kings), in production in April 2015 for a daily strip.
- Les Reines du Make-Up (Make-up Queens), since 2016 on M6 app 6play
- Joker, on air daily on France 2 at 6:15 pm, hosted by Olivier Minne and co-produced with A Prime Group.
- Les Reines du shopping (adapted from Shopping Queens), hosted by Cristina Cordula, on air daily on M6 since 2013 in access prime time.
- Le Juste Prix (adapted from The Price is right), hosted by Vincent Lagaf’ assisted by Gérard Vives, on air since 2009 daily on TF1 in access prime time, in coproduction with FremantleMedia France
- Mot de Passe (adapted from Million dollar Password), hosted by Patrick Sabatier, on air since 2009 weekly on FRANCE 2 in access prime time, in coproduction with FremantleMedia France
- La Roue de la fortune (adapted from Wheel of fortune ) hosted by Christophe Dechavanne assisted by Victoria Silvstedt, on air on TF1 in access prime time during 5 years.
- 1 contre 100 (adapted from 1 VS 100) hosted by Benjamin Castaldi, on air on TF1 in access prime time during 2 years
- Crésus (adapted from Eredita) hosted by Vincent Lagaf’ assisted by Crésus, on air during 2 years on TF1 in access prime time
- A prendre ou à laisser (adapted from Deal or no deal hosted by Arthur, on air during 3 years on TF1 in access prime time
- Zone Rouge (adapted from “ The Chair ”) hosted by Jean-Pierre Foucault, on air during 3 years on TF1 in access prime time
- Attention à la marche (creation – Watch the step) hosted by Jean-Luc Reichmann, on air during 10 years daily on TF1 at noon from Monday to Sunday.
- Le Bigdil (adapted from Let’s Make a deal) which received 7 d’Or of best game show, hosted by Vincent Lagaf’, assisted by Bill and the Gafettes, on air during 7 years daily on TF1 in access prime time
- Drôle de jeu (a light entertainment show created in France) hosted by Vincent Lagaf’, on air during 3 years in prime time on TF1
