= The Price Is Right (franchise) =

American game show franchise

The Price Is Right base wordmark introduced in 1972.

The Price Is Right is a television game show franchise created by Bob Stewart, originally produced by Mark Goodson and Bill Todman; currently it is produced and owned by Fremantle. The franchise centers on television game shows, but also includes merchandise such as video games, printed media, and board games. The franchise began in 1956 as a television game show hosted by Bill Cullen and was revamped in 1972, initially as "The New Price Is Right". This version was originally hosted by Bob Barker. Drew Carey has hosted the program since 2007.

Contestants on the show compete to win cash and prizes by guessing the price of merchandise. The program has been critically successful and remains a stalwart in the television ratings. It also managed to break away from the quiz show format that has been used in other game shows. Since the current version premiered, it has also been adapted in several international formats around the world most notably in the United Kingdom, Spain, Australia, Mexico and France.

In 2013, TV Guide ranked it No. 5 in its list of the 60 greatest game shows ever.

== 1956–1965 ==
The original version of The Price Is Right was first broadcast on NBC, and later ABC, from 1956 to 1965. Hosted by Bill Cullen, it involved four contestants bidding on a wide array of merchandise prizes with retail prices ranging from a few dollars (in many cases, "bonus" prizes were given to the winner afterward) to thousands. Though conducted in an auction style, Cullen did not play the role of auctioneer. Instead, contestants would try to bid as close to a product's actual retail price without exceeding that price. Depending on the prize, contestants were either allowed, in proper turn, to make multiple bids, or restricted to only one bid. In the case of the former, each contestant would bid on an item until a buzzer sounded. The contestant could make a final bid, or "freeze". The contestant whose bid was closest to, but not more than, the correct value of the prize won it. There was also a special game set aside for the home viewer that offered several prizes in a package, which usually included a luxury vacation trip and/or a new car. Viewers submitted their bids via postcards, and the winner was announced on the air. At the end of each episode, the contestant who had won the most (by dollar value) was declared the winner and became the returning champion, entitled to play again on the next episode.

This version began as part of NBC's daytime schedule. A series of technical problems allegedly made the pilot episode look bad enough for NBC to decline to purchase the show, but after an appeal from the producers, citing the fact that all TV shows at the time were given at least 13 weeks to succeed or fail, it aired on the network. It became successful enough to warrant a second version of the series, beginning on prime time in the fall of 1957. Shown weekly, that version became the first TV game show to be broadcast in color. After being a top-10 primetime show for some time, the show's ratings gradually but noticeably declined, and by 1963 NBC had canceled it. The show was then picked up by ABC and ran in prime time on that network for one full season (1963–64); the daytime version ended in 1965.

== 1972–present ==
=== Format ===
Since 1972, the current version of The Price Is Right has used the same structure:

- One Bid, in which four players in Contestants' Row bid on a prize, attempting to give the prize's actual retail price without exceeding it. The price is revealed and the player with the winning bid goes on stage to play a pricing game. The first four players on Contestants' Row are called from the studio audience at the start of the show, and after each pricing game, a new player is called to fill the vacant slot.
- Pricing games, in which the contestant plays for a range of prizes, frequently money or automobiles, with most games based on the player's knowledge of the retail price of the prizes or other consumer goods like food and household products.
- The Showcase, in which the two top players of the day are shown two showcases, which are collections of prizes. After the first showcase is revealed, the top player is awarded the option of bidding on the first showcase or passing it to the other player. The second showcase is then revealed and bid upon by the player who did not bid upon the first. The player who bids closer to, but does not exceed, the total retail price of their showcase wins it. If the difference between a contestant's bid and the showcase's value is within a certain range, the player wins both showcases; this range has varied over time. If both players overbid, neither wins.

When the new format debuted as The New Price Is Right, shows were 30 minutes in length; three pricing games were played and the two contestants with the highest winnings entered the Showcase. By June 1973, the show was renamed back to The Price Is Right.

The show was expanded into an hour-long format on November 3, 1975, allowing six pricing games to be played per episode. A new feature, the Showcase Showdown, was added to select the two players for the Showcase. It is played after the first three players have completed their pricing games to select one player from the first half of the show, and again after the last three. In the Showdown, each player is given two chances to spin a large wheel that displays all amounts from 5¢ to $1.00 in 5¢ increments. The player may elect to hold after his or her first spin or to take a second spin; if a second spin occurs, the amount of the second spin is added to the first spin, potentially causing the contestant's total to exceed $1.00 and eliminate the contestant. The player whose total is the closest to $1.00 without exceeding $1.00 advances to the Showcase. A score of exactly $1.00, accomplished by either the first spin stopping on the $1.00 value or by the total of two spins equaling $1.00, awards a cash bonus and gives the player a chance to win larger amounts in a bonus spin.

=== History ===
The series debuted on September 4, 1972, in two forms: a daily version on CBS with Bob Barker as host, and a weekly version, eventually dubbed "the nighttime Price Is Right," hosted by Dennis James and airing in first-run syndication. Barker took over the nighttime version in 1977 (which remained a half-hour in length throughout its existence) and hosted both until the nighttime version was discontinued in 1980. The syndicated nighttime version returned five years later, airing five times per week, but ran for only one season, with Tom Kennedy as host.

Barker hosted the program from its debut until June 15, 2007. During the 35 years he was the host, Barker won numerous awards and honors, including Daytime Emmys and a Lifetime Achievement Award. Directors of the show included Marc Breslow, Paul Alter, and Bart Eskander, who received a Daytime Emmy for Outstanding Direction of a Game Show. Producer Roger Dobkowitz won a Daytime Emmy for his work on the show, which included the development of many of the show's games that are still played today.

After a search for Barker's successor, Drew Carey was named the new host, and production resumed in August 2007, with Carey's first episode airing on October 15.

The Price Is Right is believed to be the longest-running game show on television (the Spanish-language variety show Sábado Gigante ended on September 19, 2015). It is also the longest-running five-days-per-week game show in the world. The Price Is Right is one of two game show franchises (along with To Tell the Truth) to be seen nationally in either first-run network or syndication airings in the U.S. in every decade since the 1950s. CBS has occasionally aired extra episodes of the show for short periods between the cancellation of one daytime program and the premiere of its successor. On occasion since 1986, special episodes have aired during primetime hours, most notably to fill in gaps between the Survivor series and during the 2007–08 Writers Guild of America strike.

On September 22, 2008, Terry Kneiss made game-show history by bidding the exact amount of his $23,743 showcase. Taping of the show immediately stopped, with Carey and show staffers concerned that cheating was taking place. It was later learned that Ted Slauson, an audience member and long-time fan of the show, had legitimately determined the exact prices of the showcase items after having frequently watched the show, noticing the frequency of certain products and using statistical analysis. Slauson shared this knowledge with Kneiss's wife Linda, who was sitting beside him in the audience, and she signaled the total to her husband on the stage. Kneiss was awarded the prizes, and the show subsequently discontinued certain prizes.

A musical package for The Price Is Right was composed by Edd Kalehoff. Bob Israel of Score Productions gave millions of dollars away from Kalehoff (equal to more than $10,000,000 today). The music was performed and recorded in New York City near E. 49th St. and 3rd Ave., with Kalehoff, Israel, Walt Levinsky, and co-producer and music director Stan Blits in attendance.

On April Fools' Day in 2014, Craig Ferguson and Carey switched hosting duties, with Carey hosting The Late Late Show and Ferguson hosting The Price Is Right. The episode also featured Shadoe Stevens as announcer. Barker appeared on the April Fools' Day episode in 2015, hosting while the first item up was for bids and the first pricing game; Carey hosted the remainder of the episode.

=== Broadcast history ===
Duration	Host	Notes
CBS
1972–2007	Bob Barker	
2007–present	Drew Carey	
Syndication
1972–77	Dennis James	Weekly series
1977–80	Bob Barker	Weekly series
1985–86	Tom Kennedy	Daily series
1994–95	Doug Davidson	Daily series, The New Price Is Right

Since December 1, 2020, Pluto TV airs 1980s-era episodes from the Bob Barker period on its streaming channel "The Price Is Right: The Barker Era".

==== Specials ====
Primetime episodes have been ordered by CBS on occasion since 1986. The first, The Price Is Right Special, was a six-week summer series that aired on CBS in 1986, hosted by Barker. In 2002, the show celebrated its 30th year with a Las Vegas special.

Later in 2002, the show began its current line of primetime episodes (known as #xxxSP in show codes). Six special episodes titled The Price Is Right Salutes aired in primetime, saluting the branches of the United States armed forces, police, and firefighters of in the wake of the September 11 attacks. The Price Is Right $1,000,000 Spectacular (#007SP-#033SP) was a series of primetime specials airing from 2003 until 2008 featuring chances to win $1,000,000, as well as more expensive prizes than on the daytime counterpart.

The Celebrity Week format in daytime in which a celebrity plays along with contestants was adopted for the next series of primetime episodes, part of the same series as the 2002 Salutes and 2003–08 $1,000,000 Spectaculars (since #034SP). These shows used former participants on the network's three primetime reality game shows (Survivor, The Amazing Race, and Big Brother) who joined contestants as teams. The three-night special aired May 23–25, 2016. Another series of specials, #037SP (with cast members from SEAL Team, mainly David Boreanaz, Max Thieriot, Neil Brown Jr., A.J. Buckley, Toni Trucks, Justin Melnick, and Dita the Dog) and #038SP (featuring Seth Rogen), aired during the 2019–20 television season, and three more episodes have been ordered by CBS to air during the season, #039SP-#041SP. Episodes starting with #037SP are designated as The Price Is Right at Night, with color changes to the show's logo (blue and green instead of red and orange) to represent an evening motif instead of the bright colors of the daytime show.

The civilian-celebrity format beginning with 037SP offers a charitable donation to the celebrity's charity equivalent to the total cash and prizes won, similar to the format used in daytime.

On January 12, 2020, CBS announced that three more specials would air in spring 2020.

=== Licensed merchandise ===
Endless Games, which has produced board games based on several other game shows, including The Newlywed Game and Million Dollar Password, distributes home versions of The Price Is Right, featuring the voice of announcer Rich Fields, including a DVD edition and a Quick Picks travel-size edition. Ubisoft also released a video game version of the show for the PC, Nintendo DS and Wii console on September 9, 2008. An updated version of the game (The Price Is Right: 2010 Edition) was released on September 22, 2009. Both versions feature the voice of Fields.

In September 2010, Ludia released the official Facebook version of The Price Is Right game. The game had two million monthly active users only two months after the launch.

In October 2011, Ludia (now owned by RTL Group) released The Price Is Right Decades, a video game featuring production elements from various decades of the show, for the Wii, mobile devices, PlayStation 3 and Xbox 360 to celebrate the show's 40th anniversary.

== International versions ==
The 1972 revised format appeared on Australian television the following year and debuted in the United Kingdom in 1984. The format has also been adapted elsewhere around the world. Hosts and models from the versions in other countries have made appearances on the American version, usually sitting in the audience and acknowledged by the host during the broadcast. Barker and music director Stan Blits appeared on the Carlo Boszhard-hosted Cash en Carlo at the start of the 200th episode.

Airing Not airing Upcoming or returning version

Country	Title	Network	Host	Duration dates	Notes
Afghanistan	دل نا دل; Del Na Del	ATN	Rohullah Bawari	October 1, 2022 – present	
Arab World	لعبة الاسعار; The Price Game	MYTV Arabia	Sultan Al-Rashed	April 13, 2021 – present	
Argentina	El Precio Justo	Azul Televisión (1999); El Trece (2000); Telefe (2019–20)	Fernando Bravo (1999–2000); Lizy Tagliani (2019–20)	1999–2000; February 4, 2019 – June 26, 2020	The original 1999–2000 version used a similar set to the American version and a similar logo to the French version. The 2019 version had Tagliani as the first transgender host of a classic game show.
Australia	The Price Is Right	ATN-7 (1957–59); GTV-9 (1958); Seven Network (1963, 1981–86, 2012); Network Ten (1973–74, 1989); Nine Network (1993–98, 2003–05)	Bruce Beeby (1957); Geoff Manion (1958); Keith Walshe (1959); Horrie Dargie (1963); Garry Meadows (1973–74); Ian Turpie (1981–86, 1989); Larry Emdur (1993–98, 2003–05, 2012)	1957–59; 1963; February 5, 1973 – December 19, 2012	Most versions feature similar elements to the American version: the "Double Bullseye" playoff and a pricing game similar to the current American "Easy as 1 2 3" are used for the Showcase.
Belgium	De juiste prijs	VTM	Jan Theys (1990–92); Koen Wauters (2010)	1990–92; 2010	Both versions feature similar elements to the French version
Belgium	Le Juste Prix	RTL-TVI	Michaël Dufour	2010	Both versions feature similar elements to the French version
Brazil	O Preço Certo	SBT; Rede Record	Silvio Santos; Juan Alba	1980s October 2009 – June 2010	Juan Alba's version used a similar set to the British Joe Pasquale's show (and the French show) with the same theme tune, while Silvio Santos' version used similar elements to American one.
Bulgaria	Това е цената Tova e cenata	bTV	Veselin Kalanovski; Niki Stanoev (co-host)	October 20 – November 10, 2013; January 4, 2014 – present	Aired every Sunday (21:00–22:00 EET); stopped after episode four and it was announced that it was its pilot season; restarted January 2014 and aired every Saturday form 18:00 to 19:00 EET
Canada	Misez juste	TQS	Alain Léveillé	1994–95	The original Canadian French version had a significantly cheaper budget (car rentals instead of cars, trips to Halifax and Cuba) and a set more akin to Let's Make a Deal; aired twice a week, unlike the two other versions airing at the time (the American version airs on English-language Canadian stations).
Canada	Price Is Right : À vous de jouer	V	Philippe Bond	September 7, 2011 – 2012	
Canada	The Price Is Right Tonight	Citytv	Howie Mandel	March 10, 2026 – present	Not only this is the first English speaking version in Canadian, but was the first that was inspireed by its American Primetime spinoff The Price is Right at Night. Mandel is the first international Price host in history to never use a microphone and was the first to do it in sunglasses (possibly due to the bright lights on the set) and despite having OCD (Obsessive-compulsive disorder) he is allowed to touch people and the props on stage.
Chile	Concurso Soprole	Canal 13	Don Francisco	1981–90	Aired as a segment inside Sábado Gigante.
China	购物街; Gòu Wù Jiē	CCTV-2	Gao Bo; Chen Beibei	2007–11	Name translates to "Shopping Street"; borrows many elements from the American version
China	全是你的; Quan Shi Ni De	Beijing TV	Li Yong	2015	Used some similar formats to the France 2009 version. This version was known that have a different horizontal big wheel in Showcase Showdown compared to the original vertical big wheel in CCTV-2 version and most international versions of The Price is Right.
Colombia	El precio es correcto	RTI on Cadena Uno or Cadena Dos (1982–91); Caracol TV (2011–14)	Gloria Valencia de Castaño (1982–91); Iván Lalinde (2011–14)	1982–91; 2011–14	1980s: The second game, Grand Game, was called El Mercadito (The Little Supermarket); the fourth game was a Colombian rendition of Race Game; 2011: A new season, presented by Iván Lalinde, started April 11, 2011 on Caracol TV; this version borrowed many elements from the Mexican show
Croatia	Dođi, pogodi, osvoji	RTL	Antonija Blaće	October 11, 2021 – June 26, 2025	
Ecuador	El precio es cierto				
Egypt	The Price Is Right Bekam	Al Nahar	Edward	2015	
Estonia	Kuum Hind	Kanal 2	Emil Rutiku	October 2007	
Finland	Mitä maksaa?	MTV (Yle); Nelonen	Mikko Yoderson; Petri Liski	1983–88; 1998–2000	
France	Le Juste Prix	TF1	Max Meynier (1987–88); Éric Galliano (1988); Patrick Roy (1988–92); Philippe Risoli (1992–2001)	December 13, 1987 – August 31, 2001	Aired at 12:05 on TF1 and became one of the most famous game shows of the 1990s.
France	Le Juste Prix	TF1	Vincent Lagaf'	July 27, 2009 – April 10, 2015	Aired at 19:00.
France	Le Juste Prix	M6	Éric Antoine	March 11, 2024 – present	New version hosted by comedic magician, theater director, actor and presenter Éric Antoine airs on rival network M6 instead of its original home TF1 replacing the documentary-styled reality series Le château de mes rêves (The Castle of My Dreams). The set is more similar to the American version, and the musical theme from 1987 is remixed. The show airs at 17:30.
France	Le Juste Euro	France 2	Patrice Laffont	December 31, 2001 – January 19, 2002	The series originally wanted to be called Dites-le en Euro! (Say it in Euro!) in order to separate it from Le Juste Prix but it only lasted for three weeks and was aired in December 2001 until January 2002.
Germany	Der Preis ist heiß	RTL; RTLplus; RTL Zwei	Harry Wijnvoord (1989–97, 2022–present); Wolfram Kons (2017)	May 2, 1989 – 1997; 2017; May 4, 2022 – present	The first season used a set with much pink and blue, while the later series had a set that somewhat resembled the American set; the theme music was also changed to the American theme; the intro later included a light box, like the American version. Both series used similar props to those of the American show. It was recently featured on Germany's Gameshow Marathon.
Greece	H τιμή τιμή δεν έχει I timí timí den échei	ANT1	Elias Mpenetos	1991	
Hungary	Tippelj és vidd el!	RTL	Bence Istenes	May 15 – June 23, 2023	
India	Tol Mol Ke Bol	Zee TV	R. Madhavan	1993–97	
India	Yehi Hai Right Price	DD Metro 9 Gold	Rohit Roy	January 6, 2001	
Indonesia	Tebak Harga (2001–02); The Price is Right Indonesia (2003–05, 2010–11, 2016–18, 2020, 2025)	Trans TV (2001–02; 2003–05); Indosiar (2010–11); RCTI (2016–18); GTV (2020; 2025)	Muhammad Farhan (2001–02; 2003–05); Steny Agustaf, Surya Insomnia and Ferry Ardiansyah (2010); Ananda Omesh and Gracia Indri (2016–18); Andhika Pratama and Edric Tjandra (2020); Vincent Rompies and Boiyen (2025)	December 10, 2001 – July 31, 2002; May 2, 2003 – May 27, 2005; August 11, 2010 – 2011; December 10, 2016 – March 11, 2018; August 10 – October 30, 2020; February 24–28, 2025	Tebak Harga was one of the few Asian versions to use "Bruce's Price Is Right" elements, while the other version borrowed many elements from the French (2010–2011) and U.S. (2016–present (with $ sign until 2018)) version, such as the logo, bumpers and studios. It features a single-player showcase similarly played as the U.K. (2001–2018) and Australia (2020) version.
Israel	פחות או יותר; Pachot o' Yoter	Channel 2	Aki Avni	1995–98	
Italy	OK, il prezzo è giusto!	Italia 1 (1983–87); Canale 5 (1988–96; 2026 TBA); Rete 4 (1987–88; 1996–2001)	Gigi Sabani (1983–86); Iva Zanicchi (1987–2000); Emanuela Folliero (1999); Maria Teresa Ruta (2000–01); Ilary Blasi (2026 TBA)	December 21, 1983 – April 13, 2001; December 7, 2026	The second-longest running version of The Price Is Right, airing from 1983 to 2001. One of three versions later to be hosted by a woman, but the first was hosted by a man in the early 80s; largely faithful to the American version, but the last two seasons altered the format extremely to use the Showcase round seen on the British version.
Japan	ザ・チャンス！ Za chansu!	TBS	Pink Lady; Shirō Itō; Masayuki Yuhara	April 10, 1979 – October 2, 1986	
Latvia	Veiksmes cena	TV3	Valters Krauze	January 7, 2007	
Lebanon	The Price Is Right بلا TVA	LBC	Tony Baroud	May 25, 2010	Uses similar elements to French version, such as sound effects.
Mexico	El Precio Es Blanco	Imevisión	Ángel Fernández and Patricia Panini	1980s	Sponsored by the department store chain Blanco, later Gigante, and now Soriana.
Mexico	Atinale Al Precio	Televisa	Marco Antonio Regil	October 6, 1997 – December 29, 2000; April 12, 2010 – January 21, 2011	The 2010 version uses similar elements to those of the British version; in 2007, Regil auditioned to replace Barker for the U.S. version.
Moldova	Ghiceşte Pretul	Jurnal TV	Bogdan Dascál	2016	
Mongolia	Зөв үнийг таа Zöv üniig taa	Edutainment TV		2015–16	
Morocco	استوديو 5 Astudiu 5	SNRT	Aziz Chahal	1995–96	
Morocco	السعر الصحيح; Al seer al Saheeh	SNRT		2002	
Myanmar	The Price is Right	MRTV-4	Phyo Zaw Linn	2017	
Netherlands	Prijs je Rijk	AVRO	Fred Oster	1986–88	Used the U.S. theme and similar set
Netherlands	Prijzenslag	RTL 4	Hans Kazan	January 1, 1990 – October 23, 1993	Based on Germany's Der Preis ist heiß and Bob Warman's version in the United Kingdom.
Netherlands	Cash en Carlo	Yorin	Carlo Boszhard	2002–04	A version of many European versions to borrow the format of Bruce's in the UK (although it doesn't borrow the British version's props and music cues, but uses another remix of the American Price Is Right theme as "Come on down" music). The network is referenced by its announcer Eddy Keur by telling contestant "Je bent in het spel!" ("Youin the Game!"). This was the first adaptation to be co-produced by FremantleMedia (now Fremantle) and Endemol BV (now Endemol Shine Netherlands).
Netherlands	The Price is Right	SBS6	Eddy Zoëy	2012	
Netherlands	Prijzenjacht	SBS6	Rob Janssen	September 1, 2025 – present	In this version, two duos compete for exciting prizes.
New Zealand	The Price Is Right	TV3	Dave Jamieson	1992	Filmed at TVNZ's Avalon Studios in Wellington, though the show screened on TV3. Sponsored by the Farmers department store chain, which changed its slogan to "Farmers, Where the Price Is Right". In recent years, the Australian version had been screened on New Zealand's Prime Television.
Nigeria	The Price Is Right	Africa Magic, AIT	Mannie Essien	September 1, 2024 – present	Filmed at the Muson Centre in Lagos, though the show aired on various networks in Nigeria. Used similar music to the American version from 2018–19. The show was originally going to be hosted by Frank Edoho but was later changed to Mannie Essien at the last minute while the announcing duties belonged to Chioma Okpala. Sponsored by Airtel's SmartCash, The series premiered on September 1, 2024.
Pakistan	The Price Is Right	Geo TV	Ali Salman	2010	Uses similar elements to those of Bruce's Price Is Right and current American logo in tones of blue.
Peru	Diga lo que Vale	Panamericana Televisión	Johnny López	1982–84; 1987	Featured a similar set to American version and a remix of the American opening as main theme.
Philippines	The Price Is Right	ABC	Dawn Zulueta	2001–03	The only other version of the show known to have used the Australian version of the Showcase; the first version of show ran on ABC-5 as part of the network's response to the popularity of Who Wants to Be a Millionaire? on IBC 13. The show borrowed many American and Australian elements.
Philippines	The Price Is Right	ABS-CBN	Kris Aquino	February 14 – August 13, 2011	A second Philippine version of the show was produced by ABS-CBN and hosted by Kris Aquino, borrowed many American elements.
Poland	Dobra cena	TVN	Grzegorz Wons	1997–98	One of the many European versions that used Davidson's Price Is Right music.
Portugal	O Preço Certo (1990–93, 2006–present); O Preço Certo em Euros (February 11, 2002 – April 1, 2006)	RTP1	Carlos Cruz (1990–92); Nicolau Breyner (1992–93); Jorge Gabriel (2002–03); Fernando Mendes (2003–06, 2006–present)	September 17, 1990 – 1993; February 11, 2002 – April 1, 2006; September 4, 2006 – present	The title was changed to O Preco Certo em Euros when the escudo was dropped and the euro was introduced, with Jorge Gabriel and then Fernando Mendes as host, and Miguel Vital as announcer; this version used Bruce's Price Is Right props and music (but used a synthesized version of the American theme for its closing music); when the show still used the escudo, it used a set similar to those of the American and German shows and the same music cues as those of the American show; in autumn 2006, the show relaunched, taking its inspiration from the new British version by using a similar set and music. The show also removed "em Euros" from the name, making its new title O Preço Certo.
Romania	Preţul corect	Pro TV	Stelian Nistor and Constantin Cotimanis	December 1997 – March 2000	
Romania	Spune-mi preţul	Kanal D	Cosmin Cernat	2009	
Romania	Preţul cel bun	Antena 1	Liviu Vârciu and Andrei Ştefănescu	September 6, 2021 – February 23, 2024	
Russia	Лотто-Миллион; Lotto-Million	Ostankino, ORT	Stepan Polyansky	1994–96	Non-licensed version
Russia	Цена удачи Tsena udachi	NTV	Boris Smolkin; Anton Komolov	September 11, 2005 – June 25, 2006	
Serbia	Pogodi cenu tačno	Prva	Nataša Aksentijević; Predrag Damnjanović	February 24, 2025 – present	
Slovakia	Cena je správna	TV JOJ	Andrea Lehotská and Matej Cifra (2013); Michal Hudák (2013–14)	2013–14	
Spain	El Precio Justo	TVE1 (1988–89; 1990–93, 1999–2002); TVE2 (1989–90); Antena 3 (2006–07); Telecinco (2021; 2026–present); Cuatro (2021)	Joaquín Prat (1988–93); Carlos Lozano (1999–2001); Guillermo Romero (2001–02); Juan y Medio (2006–07); Carlos Sobera (2021; 2026–present)	1988–93; 1999–2002; 2006–07; 2021; 2026–present	The 1988–93 run used a similar set to that of British Leslie Crowther's show and featured a Showcase played similarly to that of the American version but featured only one Showcase, in which both contestants bid; the 1999–2002 (based on Price is Right by Bruce) and 2006–07 (based on British Joe Pasquale's show) formats somewhat resembled the American version and used an hybrid of the British and American showcase. After the top winner selected a range at random, both contestants bid on the Showcase, hoping that their bid fell within the selected range and the closest without going over of the actual price. In the 2026 version, unlike other previous incarnations before it, Sobera is joined by a female co-host named Tania Medina.
Spain	El Precio Justo	Canal 7	Agustín Bravo	1996–97	
Thailand	ทายได้ให้เลย; Guess Right, Give Now	Channel 5	Nattee Kosolpisit	2003–04	The first version features similar elements to Australian version, minus the Showcase round which is similar to the UK version.
Thailand	The Price Is Right Thailand ราคาพารวย; The Price is Right Thailand's: Rich Price	True 4U	Ketsepsawat Palagawongse na Ayutthaya	July 27, 2015 – January 2, 2020	Second version features similar elements to American show, again minus the Showcase round.
Thailand	The Price Is Right Thailand ราคาพารวย; The Price is Right Thailand's: Rich Price	Channel 8	Ketsepsawat Palagawongse na Ayutthaya	August 17, 2020 – August 14, 2021	Second version features similar elements to American show, again minus the Showcase round.
Turkey	Kaç Para?	aTV	Özkan Uğur (2003–04); Vatan Şaşmaz (2011)	September 8, 2003 – January 23, 2004; 2011	The 2011 version borrowed many elements from the French version, such as: logo, bumpers, studios, and features a Single-player showcase similarly played as the British version, hoping that their bid is within the range, high or low.
United Kingdom	The Price Is Right; The New Price is Right (1989–90); Bruce's Price is Right (1995–2001)	ITV (1984–88, 1995–2001, 2006–07, 2020–21); Sky One (1989–90); Channel 4 (2017)	Leslie Crowther (ITV prime time); Bob Warman (Sky One daytime); Bruce Forsyth (ITV prime time); Joe Pasquale (ITV daytime); Alan Carr (Channel 4, ITV 2020–21)	March 24, 1984 – April 8, 1988; September 4, 1989 – August 31, 1990; September 4, 1995 – December 16, 2001; May 8, 2006 – January 12, 2007; December 30, 2017; June 6 – December 24, 2020; April 17 – December 23, 2021 (as part of Alan Carr's Epic Gameshow)	Crowther beat Joe Brown to the role as host after both recorded pilot episodes. The original version of the show ran from 1984 to 1988; the show was later revived in 1989 (ran from 1989 to 1990), in 1995 (ran from 1995 to 2001), and in 2006 (ran from 2006 to 2007). The theme from the 1994–95 American syndicated version was used for the show's 1995 revival. The show came back as a one-off pilot in a Christmas special on December 30, 2017, hosted by Alan Carr.
Uruguay	El Precio Justo; El Precio Justo Deluxe	Canal 4	Luis Alberto Carballo	May 2, 2022 – October 2, 2023	In season 2, it was renamed "Deluxe" on July 17, 2023
Venezuela	Lotto Quiz	Venevisión	César González	1997–99	Non-licensed version
Venezuela	El Precio Justo	RCTV	Winston Vallenilla	2002–04	
Vietnam	Hãy chọn giá đúng	VTV3	Lại Văn Sâm (2004, 2014); Lưu Minh Vũ (2005–12, 2014, 2018–19); Trần Hồng Ngọc (2012–16, 2016–18); Dương Hồng Phúc (2018–19); Phan Tuấn Tú and Nguyễn Hoàng Linh (2019–20)	June 26, 2004 – June 25, 2016; December 3, 2016 – December 26, 2020	The show featured many similar elements from the American version but used both American and Australia cues; originally hosted by Lại Văn Sâm—later hosted the Vietnamese version of Who Wants to Be a Millionaire? called Ai Là Triệu Phú since January 4, 2005. After 620 shows, it was announced on Facebook on June 28 that the show was put in hiatus for half a year to wait for its new time slot. In the following week, it was replaced by Bàn Thắng Vàng (Golden Goal). When Bàn Thắng Vàng was axed, the show returned on December 3, 2016. After its four-year return, in 2020, the revival was replaced by Trạng Nguyên Nhí (Children's Poinsettia). This is the only known version to still use the 1977 "Come on Down" theme and many of the 1970s cues from the American version.

== See also ==
- List of television game show franchises
