= Auteuil, Neuilly, Passy =

"Auteuil, Neuilly, Passy (rap BCBG)"

Single by Les Inconnus

from the album Bouleversifiant
- Released: June 1991
- Recorded: 1991
- Genre: Rap
- Length: 4:10
- Label: Lederman
- Songwriter: Les Inconnus
- Producer: Les Inconnus

Les Inconnus singles chronology
"Isabelle a les yeux bleus" (1991)	"Auteuil, Neuilly, Passy (rap BCBG)" (1991)	"Rap tout (vampire)" (1992)

"Auteuil, Neuilly, Passy (rap BCBG)" is a song recorded by the satiric group Les Inconnus in 1991. Released as a single from their album Bouleversifiant, it achieved great success in France, reaching number one on the national singles chart.

== Lyrics and music ==
After their success with many sketches, Les Inconnus decided to release this single, their biggest success, which is actually a humorous sketch. The group used music by Maceo Parker in the song without his permission; as a result, they had legal problems due to copyright issues. The song has rap and R&B sounds, and is punctuated by many "Salut ! Tu - vas - bien ?". Music & Media considered the song as a "parody on rap", in which "the three TV stars turn the tables on the usual raprecord dialogue-which often boasts of male chauvinism, ghetto talk and social engagement-by coming out with a rap about rich snobs. Miles from Brooklyn in many ways, Auteuil, Neuilly, and Passy are names of the most fashionable quarters of Paris". The song is about the life of fictitious youngsters from the upper class singing rap on their allegedly difficult lives.

The characters bear traditional French names, with lots of middle names and surnames with particles. Later we can see the same thing with the women, they bear very traditional names that are associated either with older generations or upper and more traditional classes. They use a mix of a very sophisticated language with slang words pronounced with a Parisian accent.

== Critical reception ==
According to Music & Media, "the humor [of the song] is appreciated, especially with a little understanding of French".

== Chart performances ==
In France, "Auteuil, Neuilly, Passy" was one of the biggest hits of 1991: it debuted at number two on the chart edition of 8 June and reached number one three weeks later, thus dethroning Mylène Farmer's hit "Désenchantée", stayed atop for non successive four weeks, in alternance with Lagaf's "La Zoubida", and remained in the top ten for a total of 18 weeks and in the top 50 for 21 weeks. It was certified Gold disc by the Syndicat National de l'Edition Phonographique, the French certifier, for a minimum of 250,000 units. In Belgium (Wallonia), it topped the chart for consecutive two weeks, on 10 and 17 August 1990, and remained in the top ten for nine weeks. On the European Hot 100, it entered at number 17 on 22 June 1991, reached number ten for non consecutive four weeks, and spent 19 weeks on the chart, 14 of them in the top 20. Much aired on radio, it charted for eight weeks on the European Airplay Top 50, with a peak at number 22 in its fifth week, on 20 July 1991.

== Track listings ==
- CD single
1. "Auteuil, Neuilly, Passy (rap BCBG)" — 4:10
2. "C'est ton destin" — 3:45
- 7-inch maxi
1. "Auteuil, Neuilly, Passy (rap BCBG)" — 4:10
2. "C'est ton destin" — 3:45

== Charts ==
=== Peak positions ===
Chart (1991)	Peak position
Belgium (Ultratop 50 Wallonia)	1
Europe (European Airplay Top 50)	22
Europe (European Hot 100)	10
France (SNEP)	1

=== Year-end charts ===
Chart (1991)	Position
Europe (European Hot 100)	35

=== Certifications ===
Certifications for "Auteuil, Neuilly, Passy"
Region	Certification	Certified units/sales
France (SNEP)	Gold	250,000^{*}
^{*} Sales figures based on certification alone.

== See also ==
- List of number-one singles of 1991 (France)
