= Christian Morin =

French TV and radio presenter, musician and comedian

- Born: 2 March 1945 (age 81); Bordeaux, Gironde, France
- Occupations: Radio presenter, television presenter, musician, comedian
- Years active: 1964–present
- Television: La Roue de la fortune (TF1); Succès fous (TF1)
- Website: www.christianmorin.fr

Christian Morin (born 2 March 1945) is a French television and radio presenter, musician (clarinetist) and comedian.

== Early life ==
Christian Morin was born in Bordeaux in the department of Gironde. He graduated at the Beaux-Arts de Bordeaux and then became a cartoonist for the newspaper Sud-Ouest and a graphist for the channel FR3 from 1964 to 1970. After his military service, he moved to Paris in 1971 and became a cartoonist for many newspapers like Lui and a graphist for many advertisement agencies.

== Radio career ==
In 1972, he met Pierre Delanoë, who was the director of the programs for Europe 1. He debuted on the radio station on 9 January 1972 as a game show host. He hosted programs on weekend like Hit-Parade, and became among the most famous presenters of the radio station in the 1980s. After his departure of Europe 1 in 1987, he joined the same year the station RMC where he hosted morning programs until 1992.

== Television career ==
He debuted on television on FR3 in the program Altitude 10000 in 1975 and then in Rires et sourires in 1978 for two years. In 1980, he presented Les Descendants on Antenne 2 and many other programs through the 1980s on the TSR such as La Grande Roue, Studio 4 and Trèfle d'or. He also hosted the second season of the show Les Paris de TF1 on channel TF1 first hosted by Pierre Bellemare in 1981 and then Histoire d'en rire in 1982. He was on 20 February 1986 the presenter who introduced the channel La Cinq with Voilà la Cinq. He presented on the same channel the French version of a successful Italian game show titled Cherchez la femme with Amanda Lear.

He then joined TF1 in 1987 to host the game show La Roue de la fortune with Annie Pujol. He also hosted many other successful programs like Succès fous with Philippe Risoli and Patrick Roy. The success of La Roue de la fortune let the appearance of a parody with Le Grand Bluff, in which Patrick Sébastien attempts a provocation in 1992. He also hosted a special program in 1989 to celebrate the centenary of the Eiffel Tower. He later left the channel to let the place for younger presenters.

After his departure of TF1 in 1993 and after the program Rires sur la ville with Amanda Lear, he joined France Télévisions to present a number of game shows, including Combien tu paries ? on France 2 and an adaptation of the game Cluedo on France 3 in 1994. He presents that same year the Victoires de la Musique on France 2. He then left the television field except for presenting Shopping à la une on TF1 from 1999 to 2000.

== Musical career ==
Christian Morin has recorded a few records in which he plays the clarinet. He also participated at the musical comedy Envoyez la musique with Annie Cordy at the Théâtre de la Porte Saint-Martin in 1982 and 1983.

== Filmography ==
- 2006 : A City Is Beautiful at Night
- 2015 : Valentin Valentin
