= Émilien (Les Douze Coups de midi) =

French student and game show champion

- Émilien at the 2025 edition of ZEvent.
- Born: 13 December 2002 (age 23); Nantes, France
- Occupations: History student, game show contestant
- Known for: Les Douze Coups de midi
- Television: Les Douze Coups de midi
- Awards: Record holder for appearances and winnings on Les Douze Coups de midi

Émilien (born 13 December 2002) is a French game show contestant. He became known for his run on the French game show Les Douze Coups de midi, broadcast on TF1, while he was a student. He holds the record for the highest winnings and longest run in the history of French television game shows.

The longest-serving Maître de midi in the history of the program, Émilien made 647 consecutive appearances and won 646 games, accumulating €2.56 million in cash and prizes over more than 21 months.

== Early life ==
Émilien was born on 13 December 2002 in Nantes, Loire-Atlantique, France. He grew up in the village of Péault in Vendée. He studied history in Toulouse, but interrupted his studies to devote himself to quizzes.

=== Television career ===
On 25 September 2023, Émilien made his first appearance on Les Douze Coups de midi, broadcast on TF1. He developed a method based on structured memorisation and logical reasoning, which helped him distinguish himself on the programme.

He won 646 games. During his 21 months on the game show, he accumulated €2,566,931 in cash and prizes, including the value of the gifts associated with the 23 Étoiles mystérieuses he won. He was eliminated on 6 July 2025.

He holds the record for consecutive appearances on Les Douze Coups de midi, after surpassing the previous record of 252 appearances held by Bruno Hourcade on 3 June 2024.

In January 2026, Émilien appeared on the TF1 programme Qui sera le plus nul ?, where the objective was for contestants to be eliminated as early as possible. He was the first contestant to leave the competition.

On 7 March 2026, he appeared among the contestants of the Toulouse program Les 31 Coups du midi, a quiz show, where he again finished first.

On 21 March 2026, he appeared for the first time on Le Quiz des Champions on France 2, winning the final against Enzo, a contestant from Slam.

On 22 August 2026, he appeared on Fort Boyard.

== Personal life ==
Since his elimination from Les Douze Coups de midi, Émilien runs a Twitch channel with more than 180,000 followers, where he broadcasts various livestreams, including reactions to Tout le monde veut prendre sa place and video games.

Since March 2026, he has hosted La Table des Savoirs, his own general knowledge programme associated with his quiz website, launched in January 2026. The programme is produced by ZQSD Productions, a company also involved in the organisation of ZEvent.

== Filmography ==
Year	Title	Role	Note
2023–2025	Les Douze Coups de midi	Self	Contestant
2024–present	Culture Clash	Self	Guest
2026	Qui sera le plus nul ?	Self	Contestant
2026	Les 31 Coups de Midi	Self	Contestant
2026	Le Quiz des Champions	Self	Contestant
2026	Fort Boyard	Self	Contestant

== See also ==
- Les Douze Coups de midi
- Jean-Luc Reichmann
- Ken Jennings
