= All Shapes of Us =

2026 French television series

- Genre: Drama
- Created by: Fanny Riedberger
- Directed by: Jean-Baptiste Pouilloux; Elsa Bennett
- Starring: Catherine Frot; Claudia Tagbo; Joséphine Draï; Cécile Rebboah; Michaël Abiteboul
- Country of origin: France
- Original language: French
- No. of episodes: 6

Production
- Running time: 52 minutes
- Production companies: Habanita; Studio TF1

Original release
- Network: TF1
- Release: 2026

All Shapes of Us is a French drama television series created by Fanny Riedberger and broadcast by TF1. The six-part series won the prize for best series in the French competition at Series Mania in 2026.

== Premise ==
The series follows six teenagers — Honorine, Lola, Madi, Yohan, Karima and Nico — at a specialist school for young people with eating disorders, as they work to build or rebuild their self-confidence and navigate their relationships with one another.

== Cast ==
- Catherine Frot
- Claudia Tagbo
- Gérémy Crédeville
- Marc Riso
- Joséphine Draï
- Cécile Rebboah
- Sarah Stern
- Catherine Benguigui
- Guillaume Bouchède
- Cyril Gueï
- Juliette Tresanini
- Michaël Abiteboul

== Production ==
The series was created by Fanny Riedberger and directed by Jean-Baptiste Pouilloux and Elsa Bennett, from scripts by a writing team including Caroline Franc, Christophe Régin, Géraldine De Margerie and Camille Rosset. It was produced by Habanita and Studio TF1, and runs to six episodes of 52 minutes.

== Awards ==
All Shapes of Us won the award for best series in the French competition at Series Mania in March 2026.
