= Attention à la marche! =

- Genre: Quiz show
- Created by: Jean-Luc Reichmann; Marie Schneider; Hervé Hubert
- Presented by: Jean-Luc Reichmann
- Country of origin: France
- Original language: French
- No. of seasons: 10
- No. of episodes: 3237

Production
- Producers: Jean-Jacques Amsellem; Franck Broqua; Jean-Louis Cap; Gabriel Cotto; Didier Fraisse; Antoine Galey
- Running time: 45 minutes
- Production companies: Formidooble; DV Prod

Original release
- Network: TF1
- Release: 10 March 2001 – 26 June 2010

Attention à la marche! is a French game show that was broadcast from 12:10 p.m. to 12:50 p.m. on TF1 from 10 March 2001, first on weekends and then every day from 3 September 2001 to 26 June 2010 (with a best-of on 27 June 2010). On 28 June 2010 Attention à la marche ! was replaced by another game show, Les Douze Coups de midi, which is broadcast every day.

The show was hosted by Jean-Luc Reichmann and was co-produced by Formidooble, the company of Jean-Luc Reichmann and Marie Schneider, and DV Prod, a company created by Hervé Hubert, a subsidiary of Endemol France and the Endemol group. It celebrated its 2999th episode on 2 November 2009, then its 3000th episode on 3 November 2009. The game show Attention à la marche ! aired its last episode on 26 June 2010, at the end of the tenth season. Jean-Luc Reichmann is now a host of Les Douze Coups de midi.

== Gameplay ==
On weekdays, the game is played by anonymous, single contestants. On Wednesdays and Saturdays, children or teenagers are accompanied by their parents. Most Sundays, celebrities play for an association, or people with something in common (e.g. four ventriloquists or four conjurers). It often happens that celebrities play the first step on Saturday, and the last two on Sunday.

In all cases, the aim is to climb the "steps" to win a sum of up to €20,000 since 2007.

Only one of the 4 contestants can attempt to win this sum, which is shared with a viewer.

=== Pre-Step ===
This round was created on 20 June 2008. Candidates are drawn at random from the audience.

Before the 1st round, the 4 candidates must answer general knowledge questions using a "mushroom". The questions are revealed bit by bit, and candidates can take over at any time (with a set waiting time if they get the answer wrong). The first to give the right answer scores a point, represented by a "buddy", a CGI character appearing on his screen. Two "buddies" qualify the candidate for the 1st Step.

The Pre-Step continues until three candidates qualify for the 1st step, the last being eliminated.

=== 1st Step (Step to 3) ===
The 3 candidates or pairs of candidates (previously 4 before summer 2008) have to answer logic, general knowledge or survey questions about 100 French people. The answer must be an exact number.

For each question, the candidate furthest from the answer loses one of his or her two "buddies". In the event of a tie, the slower candidate loses a buddy (previously, both candidates lost a buddy). The candidate who loses both buddies is eliminated.

When a contestant finds the right answer to a question, he or she gets an "all up" and wins a gift. In the early days of the show, if a contestant got it right, they didn't get a prize. Soon afterwards, the host gave the contestant a choice of two envelopes (yellow and orange, or blue and purple), one containing a gift of good value, the other containing a gift of lesser value (e.g. a disposable camera).

Between each question, the host asks the contestants to tell an anecdote related to the theme of the next question.

It's in this round that the traditional "naughty question" (the fourth before summer 2008, the second since) about love takes place. When the host asks this question, we hear Joe Cocker's song You can leave your hat on, which is the soundtrack to the film 9 1/2 weeks.

During the summer of 2008 only, it was the two candidates (out of the three) who lost their buddies who were eliminated. Nevertheless, the public voted for their favorite candidate. The candidate who received the most votes was allowed to move on to the second round, and was dubbed "The Public's Favorite", while the only candidate who hadn't lost his two buddies during the first round was simply dubbed the overall winner. This method was abandoned in September 2008.

When the 3 candidates have only one "buddy" left, a question called "the golden question", more serious than the others, is asked to break the tie. At this point, an excerpt from Protest, the fourth section of Morton Gould's concerto Spirituals for Strings Choir and Orchestra, is played.

=== 2nd Step (Face to Face) ===
The remaining 2 candidates or pairs of candidates face off in the second Walk. Starting on 1 March 2007, each of them has two 45-second rounds in which to give as many correct answers as possible to the questions put to them, in order to win as many points as possible. Contestants score 1 point for a correct answer, none for a wrong one. The host can stop the timer at any time if a candidate gives an unusual or unexpected answer, if the question needs clarification, or if it's a music-related question (in which case the music relevant to the question is played).

The contestant or pair of contestants with the most points advances to the final. The other candidate is eliminated and usually wins an LCD screen.

In the event of a tie, they must answer the "golden questions": as in a penalty shoot-out, each candidate or couple is asked a question. If one candidate answers a question correctly, while the other answers another question incorrectly, the candidate who answered correctly goes through to the final. Otherwise, a new question is put to each candidate or pair of candidates.

=== 3rd Step (The Ascent of the Steps) ===
To begin with, the candidate or couple of candidates wins the guaranteed sum of €500. They can try to double their winnings with each question, up to €4,000 if they answer the first 3 questions correctly.

For each question, they can choose between 2 possible answers. Then, he'll try to quintuple his winnings by answering a question with 4 possible answers. For this last question, the contestant gives an initial answer and then asks the eliminated contestants whether they agree or disagree. The contestant can then keep his or her answer or change his or her mind.

If the candidate or couple of candidates answer €4,000 correctly, they win €20,000 (if they have answered the other 3 questions correctly).

When a contestant wins €20,000, Michael Jackson's "Earth Song" is played.

The show often features touching reactions of sadness or joy from the contestants.

From 3 July 2009 to 5 September 2009, the loser of the head-to-head can win in the final. The winner of this face-off answers the 1st question, and if he/she answers correctly, he/she answers the next question. If not, there is a "cross-over" between the 2 candidates, and the loser answers this question. The same applies to the second and third questions. If the winner of the face-off answers the last question correctly, he or she wins €20,000, otherwise €2,000. If the face-to-face loser answers the last question correctly, he wins €10,000, otherwise €1,000. To illustrate this rule, Jean-Luc Reichmann often says: "One goes forward, the other goes back, it's the great game of seesaw" (French: « L'un avance, l'autre recule, c'est le grand jeu de la bascule »). However, this rule is not applied when celebrities and children are playing.

== International versions ==
The TV format, created entirely in France, has been exported to three countries around the world. The game show first saw the light of day in Spain with the title Números locos, broadcast on Antena 3 in 2005 and presented by Carlos Sobera.

In 2007, Russian TV channels Rossiya and Bibigon bought the show's format. In July 2007 it became known that the format of the French TV show was being exported to Russia. In Russia, the show was released under the name Ступени (Stupeni) from 3 September 2007 to 23 August 2008. A Russian version of the TV show was hosted by Sergey Belogolovtsev.

In Vietnam, the TV show Con số vui nhộn aired on VTV9 and was hosted by Đại Nghĩa.

In Portugal, the TV show Quem Quer Ganha for a short time used the format based on the French TV game show Attention à la marche ! from 29 June 2009 to October 2009.

Country	Title	Presenter	Broadcaster	Premiere	Finale
France (original version)	Attention à la marche !	Jean-Luc Reichmann	TF1	3 September 2001	26 June 2010
Portugal	Quem Quer Ganha (Note: Quem Quer Ganha was generally a Portuguese version of Puzzeltijd, another show produced by Endemol. For a short time, Quem Quer Ganha used the format based on a French TV show Attention à la marche! from 29 June 2009 to October 2009. Later, on 2 November 2009, the show reverted to the Puzzeltijd show format.)	Teresa Peres	TVI	29 June 2009	October 2009
Russia	Ступени; Stupeni	Sergey Belogolovtsev	Russia, Bibigon	3 September 2007	23 August 2008
Spain	Números locos	Carlos Sobera	Antena 3	24 January 2005	1 July 2005
Turkey	Aman Dikkat!	Vatan Şaşmaz	Kanal 1	7 August 2006	29 December 2006
Vietnam	Con số vui nhộn	Đại Nghĩa	VTV9	20 December 2007	2009
