= Endemol France =

French television production company

- Formerly: Case Productions (1994–2010); Endemol France (first incarnation) (2001–2017); Endemol Shine France (2017–2021)
- Type: Subsidiary
- Industry: Entertainment
- Predecessor: Télé Images Endemol Divertissements (1995–1998); Shine France (2009–2017)
- Founded: 1994
- Founders: Stéphane Courbit; Jacques "Arthur" Essebag
- Parent: Endemol (1998–2015); Endemol Shine Group (2015–2020); Banijay Entertainment (2020–present)
- Subsidiaries: 4-3-3 Production; BC11; Endemol France Sport; Puzzle Media
- Website: www.endemolfrance.com

Endemol France (formerly known as Case Productions and Endemol Shine France) is a French production subsidiary of Banijay Entertainment.

== History ==
In Spring 1994, television presenter Arthur and producer Stéphane Courbit launched two French television production companies named CASE Productions which is an acronym of its full name "Courbit Arthur Stéphane Essebag" and Arthur Stéphane Productions (ASP) to produce game shows & talk shows to the French broadcasters.

In 1998, it was announced that Dutch audiovisual production group named Endemol had acquired a 50% stake in French production company ASP/CASE Productions from Arthur and Courbit.

On 8 December 2006, Endemol announced that they would reacquire their French division Endemol France from their former parent Telefónica. By 9 January 2007, the Dutch-based European entertainment company had made a deal with their former parent company Telefónica to buy back their French outfit which would become a division of the reunited Dutch-based entertainment giant.

In October 2007, Endemol France announced their CEO Stéphane Courbit had been stepping down his role of being CEO after working with Endemol France for 12 years

In June 2009 five years before Endemol France merged with Shine France and ten years before Banijay's acquisition of Endemol Shine France, Shine Group announced that they've expanding their operation into France by creating their new division named Shine France and had hired former Endemol France chief content officer Thierry Lachkar to become Shine France's CEO.

On April 7, 2021, Endemol Shine France rebranded themselves back to its original name Endemol France.

== Filmography ==
Title	Years	Network	Notes
Le Bigdil	1998–2004	TF1	
Loft Story	2001–2002	M6	
Attention à la marche !	2001–2010	TF1	
Star Academy	2001–present	TF1/NRJ 12	
L'Île de la tentation	2002–present	TF1/Virgin 17/W9	
Nice People	2003	M6	
La Ferme Célébrités	2004-2010	TF1	
Le Pensionnat de Chavagnes/Sarlat	2004-2005	M6	
Première Compagnie	2005	TF1	
Je suis une célébrité, sortez-moi de là !	2006-2019	TF1	
La Roue de la fortune	2006–present	TF1/M6	
Êtes-vous plus fort qu'un élève de 10 ans ?	2007	M6	
Secret Story	2007–present	TF1/NT1/TFX	co-production with So Nice Productions (seasons 1–4) and 2M Productions (season 1)
1 contre 100	2007-2008	TF1	
L'École des stars	2008-2009	Direct 8	
Love and Bluff : Qui de nous trois ?	2009	TF1	
Les Douze Coups de midi	2010–present	TF1	
MasterChef France	2010-2022	TF1/NT1/France 2	
Carré ViiiP	2011	TF1	
The Island	2015-2025	M6	
Qui est la taupe ?	2015	M6	
The Apprentice : Qui décrochera le job ?	2015	M6	
The Bridge : Le Trésor de Patagonie	2019	M6	
Lego Masters	2020–2025	M6	
LOL : qui rit, sort !	2021–present	Amazon Prime Video	
Drag Race France	2022–present	France.tv Slash/France 2	co-production with World of Wonder
Drag Race France All Stars	2025–present	France 2	co-production with Shake Shake Shake and World of Wonder
