= Patrick Roy (disambiguation) =

Patrick Roy (born 1965) is a Canadian professional ice hockey coach and former goaltender.

Patrick Roy may also refer to:

- Patrick Roy (politician) (1957–2011), French politician
- Patrick Roy (TV presenter) (1952–1993), French television animator
- Patrick Roy (producer), Canadian film industry executive
