= La ruota della fortuna =

Italian edition of Wheel of Fortune

- Genre: Game show
- Based on: Wheel of Fortune by Merv Griffin
- Directed by: Franco Bianca (1987–1988); Mario Bianchi (1989–2003); Luciana Marotta (2003); Giuliana Baroncelli (2007–2009); Giancarlo Giovalli (2024–present)
- Presented by: Augusto "Casti" Mondelli (1987–1988); Mike Bongiorno (1989–2003); Enrico Papi (2007–2009); Gerry Scotti (2024–present); Samira Lui (2024–present)
- Judges: Illy Reale (1989–1993); Alvise Borghi (1993–1997); Davide Tortorella (1997–2003)
- Theme music composer: Enrico Santulli (1989–1995); Luca Orioli (1995–2003); Merv Griffin, John Hoke, Bleeding Fingers Music (2024–present)
- Opening theme: "Gira la ruota" (1995–2009) "Changing Keys" (2021 version, 2024–present)
- Country of origin: Italy
- Original language: Italian
- No. of seasons: 22
- No. of episodes: 3757

Production
- Executive producer: Margherita Caligiuri (1994–1995, 1997–1999); Maria Eugenia Ghezzi (1994–1997, La ruota mundial); Carolina Borella (1999–2003); Anna Maria Mazzilli (2003); Lino Tatalo (2007–2009); Bellamie Blackstone (2024–present)
- Producer: Vania Prada (1997–1999); Nazarena Intino (1999–2001); Anna Paracchini (1994–1997, 2001–2003); Sabrina Bolognini (2007–2009); Stefania Borgonovo (La ruota mundial)
- Production company: Banijay (2007–2009, 2024–present)

Original release
- Network: Odeon TV
- Release: 19 October 1987 – 1988
- Network: Canale 5
- Release: 1989 – 1996
- Network: Rete 4
- Release: 1996 – 2003
- Network: Italia 1
- Release: 2007 – 2009
- Network: Canale 5
- Release: 6 May 2024 – present

La ruota della fortuna is the Italian version of Wheel of Fortune. The show has run nonstop since 1988 on Canale 5 and Rete 4, and switched from a trilon to an electronic board in the mid-1990s, like the American version. Previously hosted by Mike Bongiorno, the show was hosted by Enrico Papi on Italia 1, and featured Victoria Silvstedt from the French version of the show, La Roue de la Fortune. Fifteen years later, it returned to the air on Canale 5 from 6 May 2024, hosted by Gerry Scotti and Samira Lui.

In 1985, the show was one of several game shows that was part of the television series, Pentatlon, which was also hosted by Mike Bongiorno. The show aired on Canale 5. From September 1987 to 1988, the show aired on Odeon TV. This version had the shopping element that the American version, along with several other versions at the time, had. This version had a different host.

== Differences in gameplay compared to the American version ==
=== The Electronic Puzzle Board (circa 1998–2003) ===
This is the only puzzle board in the world where, if more than one letter was revealed, the hostess only had to touch one, and all would simultaneously appear. Prior to its introduction, and like many other versions, the board used trilons.

==== 2008 ====
The board on the modern Italian version acted like the American version's puzzle board in that letters would light up one at a time, and the hostess had to touch all letters.

=== Vowels ===
In 2002, the price for buying a vowel changed from Lit. 1,000,000 to €300. On the 2007 revival, each vowel cost €200.

=== The Wheel ===
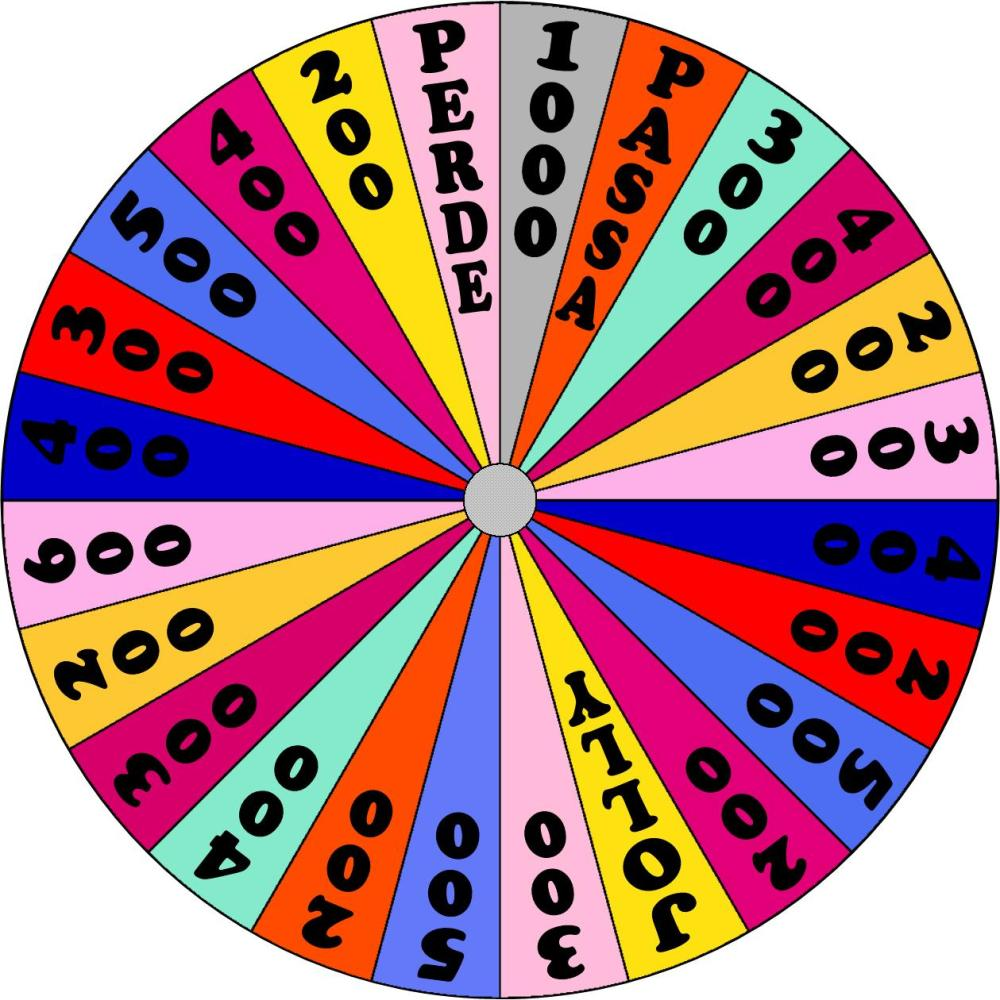
The round one wheel from 1988 with all values in multiples of 1,000 with Lit. 1,000,000 (represented by the number 1,000) as top value.

When the show was on 'Pentatlon' using Italian lira as its currency, the 15-wedge wheel configuration ran from Lit. 100,000 to Lit. 1,000,000. On the Odeon version, the number of wedges increased to 24, and amounts ranged from Lit. 50,000 to Lit. 1,000,000. In round 3, the amounts increased with Lit. 100,000 as the smallest and Lit. 3,000,000 as the biggest. In 1989, Lit. 1,000,000, Lit. 1,300,000, and Lit. 2,000,000 were the top amounts of the first three rounds. The following year, the smallest amount of Lit. 200,000 increased to Lit. 300,000, and Lit. 1,000,000 became the top amount for the first two rounds. This changed from €150 to €500 (€200 to €1,000 in round 3) when Italy adopted the euro in 2002. From 1999 to 2001, however, a blue band was inserted at the wheel's edge showing the euro value equivalent to each corresponding wedge. For example, a wedge worth Lit. 300,000 had a blue band noting that the same wedge was worth €154.94. In 2001, the euro and the lira values swapped positions. By 2002, the band was removed, and the euro values were changed again, ranging from €50 to €300 (€100 to €600 in round 3).

Values were displayed in thousands of liras from 1989 to 2002. That meant if a player landed on a wedge that had the number 300 on it, the player would be playing for L.300,000. In addition to amounts ranging from €100 to €500, the most recent version adopted two rules from the French version by putting a €0 on the wheel, meaning players keep their turn but earn nothing for a correct letter, and also the "Cave" feature. The Lose a Turn wedge is known as "Passa" and the Bankrupt wedge is "Perde" or "Bancarotta".

==== The Free Spin ====
This was referred to as a "Jolly", due to the clown picture being on the token. It had to be earned with a correct letter, and could be turned in if a mistake was made. On "Pentatlon", it was named Bonus. On the 1987-88 Odeon version, it was known as "Rilancia". Originally, the word "Jolly" was placed as an entire wedge on the wheel, and players could earn multiple free spins, spinning again immediately after earning one.

==== Warm-Up Lap ====
The "warm-up lap" carried over from Pentatlon, but was dropped after the first few episodes. What it did, however, was allow each player exactly one spin and one guess, regardless of whether or not the letter was in the puzzle, starting with the player whose turn it was to begin the round. After each player got one guess, the game continued in the standard fashion with the player who began the round continuing to control the wheel until he/she made a mistake or landed on either penalty space. Landing on the Free Spin (known as a "Jolly") during the warm-up lap allowed a player a free spin, but control immediately passed to the next player instead of allowing the player a second spin.

==== Bankrupt ====
Written on the wheel as "Perde", short for "Perde tutto" ("loses everything"). The wedge was renamed Bancarotta in 2007. In the 2024 version, all winnings from the entire game are forfeited to a Bankrupt.

==== Lose a Turn ====
Written on the wheel as "Passa", short for "Passa mano" ("loses a turn").

==== 5-Second Timer ====
The show employed a rule that all decisions had to be made within 5 seconds. This was represented by a series of bells and a chime originally; later on it changed to a ticking clock and a gong. Sometimes leniency was allowed in the event that Mike was in the middle of giving instructions, since the clock didn't stop ticking.

==== Toss-up puzzles ====
From 2007 to 2009, each round began with a toss-up puzzle (similar to the French version). The first player to solve the puzzle began the round with €500, and had to solve the puzzle to keep it but would lose it to a Bankrupt. An additional toss-up puzzle was played to determine the order intro to start the show before the first round proper, so solving both puzzles meant the player would start Round 1 with €1,000. The audience would chant each letter out loud as it was revealed.

=== Bonus Round ===
Played exactly the same as the American version. At first, the winner chose which prize to play for. Starting in 1995, players chose from three random envelopes (similar to the "WHEEL" envelopes in the early 1990s in the US); from 2007 to 2008, they spun a miniature wheel with prizes ranging from €5,000 to €200,000, or a new car. From 2008 until the end of its run in 2009, the top prize of €200,000 was halved to €100,000.

The first two runs used the original rules of players choosing five consonants and a vowel, but they would not be told the category until after all letters chosen were revealed if they were in the puzzle; Mike would say the category, after which the 15-second timer immediately started. The 2007–09 run gave the player R, S, T, and E for free, and then they had to pick 3 more consonants and a vowel. Unlike the US version (which only gives 10 seconds), the contestant had 30 seconds to solve the puzzle and was told the category beforehand.

== Parole d'oro (Golden Words) ==
Airing from 1987 to 1988 on Sunday evenings and ending in 1988 due to low ratings, Parole d'oro (Golden Words) was a knockoff of La ruota della fortuna with notable differences. The main difference in Italy was that the Wheel, rather than using money, had all letters of the alphabet (the Italian alphabet does not use J, K, W, X, or Y, except on loanwords) plus one each of Bankrupt and Wild. Players who landed on a letter could take the letter (for Lit. 500,000 per appearance) or pass their turn, as a wrong letter cost that player Lit. 500,000. This also meant that negative scores were possible (although it is not known what would have happened had a player with a negative score landed on a Bankrupt).

Some letters on the Wheel were gold, and hence were worth Lit. 1,000,000 per appearance. Landing on the Wild space allowed that player to choose a letter. Once a puzzle was solved, all players won what was on their display, with the person who solved receiving an additional Lit. 5,000,000. (This has a similarity to the UK "Wheel", where all players keep their points they scored when the puzzle gets solved.) In some instances, players were allowed to use a Joker in the event the wheel landed on a letter already called so that they may call a different letter that hadn't been called yet; doing so still earned Lit. 500,000 per appearance if the letter was in the puzzle, or costing Lit. 500,000 if it wasn't. The Bonus Round allowed the player to choose five letters, albeit picked at random from a bag. Solving the puzzle doubled that player's winnings. The players had 60 seconds to solve the puzzle.

== Notes ==
The "Showcase Showdown" round of the Italian version of The Price Is Right (OK, il prezzo è giusto!) was also called La ruota della fortuna, as a wheel was used in the game. Both shows successfully aired on the same network at the same time at various points in their history.
