= Totale impro =

Totale impro is the French version of Schillerstraße, an improvised sitcom that played on the German television channel, Sat.1. Totale impro first aired on France's M6 on November 26, 2005, and ran till February 25, 2006. The series was hosted by Benjamin Castaldi, who also produced it along with the company B3com.

== Premise ==
For 26 minutes, in public, comedians have to produce a scene identical to that in a theatre, while improvising their text based on a situation evolving from the characteristics of their characters (which were determined prior to the sketch). To do this, each comedian wears an earpiece, connected live to the microphone of the show's presenter (in this case Benjamin Castaldi, in France). He gives games for the artists in the scene to improvise. In France, each episode took place in the apartment of Sören and Noémie (brother and sister), with their different friends and co-workers visiting.

== Cast and characters ==
- Catherine Benguigui : the apartment supervisor
- Alain Bouzigues : a friend of Noémie
- Edith Cochrane : a friend of Noémie
- Noémie De Lattre : lawyer and sister of Sören
- Arnaud Gidoin : a friend of Sören
- Tatiana Goussef : a friend of Noémie
- Sören Prévost : comedian and brother of Noémie

== See also ==
- List of French Adaptations of Television Series from Other Countries
