= Lederman =

Lederman or Ledermann is a surname. Notable people with the surname include:

- Alexandra Ledermann (born 1969), French Olympic equestrian
- Barbara Ledermann (born 1925), Holocaust survivor
- Ben Lederman (born 2000), Polish footballer
- D. Ross Lederman (1894–1972), American B-film director
- Dr. Gilbert "Gil" Lederman, physician, talk radio host, and proponent of radiosurgery, notoriously sued by the estate of George Harrison (for breaching Harrison's privacy and for forcing Harrison to sign a guitar)
- Hans Ledermann (born 1957), Swiss cyclist
- Harold Lederman (1940–2019), American boxing judge and analyst
- Ida Ledermann (1893–1967), German art historian
- Jean-Marc Lederman, Belgian music composer
- Leon M. Lederman (1922–2018), Nobel laureate in physics
- Marty Lederman, Visiting Professor of Law at the Georgetown University Law Center
- Nicki Ledermann (born 1968), German make-up artist for TV and film
- Sanne Ledermann (1928–1943), victim of the Holocaust
- Susan Lederman, Canadian experimental psychologist
- Walter Ledermann (1911–2009), mathematician
- William Lederman (1916–1992), Canadian constitutional scholar and the first dean of Queen's University Faculty of Law
