= List of number-one singles of 1991 (France) =

This is a list of the French SNEP Top 100 Singles number-ones of 1991.

== Summary ==
=== Singles Chart ===
Week	Issue Date	Artist	Single
1	January 5	François Feldman	"Petit Frank"
2	January 12	François Feldman	"Petit Frank"
3	January 19	Félix Gray and Didier Barbelivien	"Il faut laisser le temps au temps"
4	January 26	Félix Gray and Didier Barbelivien	"Il faut laisser le temps au temps"
5	February 2	Enigma	"Sadeness (Part I)"
6	February 9	Enigma	"Sadeness (Part I)"
7	February 16	Enigma	"Sadeness (Part I)"
8	February 23	Enigma	"Sadeness (Part I)"
9	March 2	Enigma	"Sadeness (Part I)"
10	March 9	Scorpions	"Wind of Change"
11	March 16	Scorpions	"Wind of Change"
12	March 23	Scorpions	"Wind of Change"
13	March 30	Scorpions	"Wind of Change"
14	April 6	Scorpions	"Wind of Change"
15	April 13	Scorpions	"Wind of Change"
16	April 20	Scorpions	"Wind of Change"
17	April 27	Mylène Farmer	"Désenchantée"
18	May 4	Mylène Farmer	"Désenchantée"
19	May 11	Mylène Farmer	"Désenchantée"
20	May 18	Mylène Farmer	"Désenchantée"
21	May 25	Mylène Farmer	"Désenchantée"
22	June 1	Mylène Farmer	"Désenchantée"
23	June 8	Mylène Farmer	"Désenchantée"
24	June 15	Mylène Farmer	"Désenchantée"
25	June 22	Mylène Farmer	"Désenchantée"
26	June 29	Les Inconnus	"Auteuil, Neuilly, Passy (rap BCBG)"
27	July 6	Les Inconnus	"Auteuil, Neuilly, Passy (rap BCBG)"
28	July 13	Les Inconnus	"Auteuil, Neuilly, Passy (rap BCBG)"
29	July 20	Lagaf'	"La Zoubida"
30	July 27	Les Inconnus	Auteuil, Neuilly, Passy (rap BCBG)
31	August 3	Lagaf'	"La Zoubida"
32	August 10	Lagaf'	"La Zoubida"
33	August 17	Lagaf'	"La Zoubida"
34	August 24	Lagaf'	"La Zoubida"
35	August 31	Lagaf'	"La Zoubida"
36	September 7	Lagaf'	"La Zoubida"
37	September 14	Lagaf'	"La Zoubida"
38	September 21	Lagaf'	"La Zoubida"
39	September 28	Lagaf'	"La Zoubida"
40	October 5	Lagaf'	"La Zoubida"
41	October 12	Bryan Adams	"(Everything I Do) I Do It for You"
42	October 19	Bryan Adams	"(Everything I Do) I Do It for You"
43	October 26	Bryan Adams	"(Everything I Do) I Do It for You"
44	November 2	Bryan Adams	"(Everything I Do) I Do It for You"
45	November 9	Bryan Adams	"(Everything I Do) I Do It for You"
46	November 16	Bryan Adams	"(Everything I Do) I Do It for You"
47	November 23	Bryan Adams	"(Everything I Do) I Do It for You"
48	November 30	Bryan Adams	"(Everything I Do) I Do It for You"
49	December 7	Patrick Bruel	"Qui a le droit..."
50	December 14	Patrick Bruel	"Qui a le droit..."
51	December 21	Patrick Bruel	"Qui a le droit..."
52	December 28	Patrick Bruel	"Qui a le droit..."

== See also ==
- 1991 in music
- List of number-one singles in France
- List of artists who reached number one on the French Singles Chart
