= Titus the Fox =

1991 video game

- Developer: Titus France
- Publisher: Titus France
- Designer: Florent Moreau
- Programmer: Eric Zmiro
- Artists: Francis Fournier; Stephan Beaufils
- Platforms: Amiga, Amstrad CPC, Atari ST, MS-DOS, Game Boy, Game Boy Color
- Release: 1991: NA: November 2, 2000
- Genre: Platform
- Mode: Single-player

Titus the Fox: To Marrakech and Back is a side-scrolling platform game developed by Titus France for the Amiga, Amstrad CPC, Atari ST, and MS-DOS. The game was originally released in 1991 under the name Lagaf': Les Aventures de Moktar — Vol 1: La Zoubida, featuring French comedian Lagaf' as a tie-in with his song "La Zoubida". For the international edition, Titus retooled the game to feature its mascot and released the game as Titus the Fox: To Marrakech and Back in 1992.

== Gameplay ==
Amiga version

Titus's beloved Foxy has been kidnapped on the other side of the Sahara desert, and to get her back the player must advance through 14 levels. The goal is to avoid dogs, construction workers, giant bees, and other creatures. The player can fight back by throwing objects back at them or picking walking enemies up from behind and throwing them as projectiles at other obstacles. Stacking thrown objects is often required to get to the end of most levels. The game uses a code-based "saving" system, with the codes calculated uniquely for each machine.

== Ports ==
In the Game Boy Color version, the ability to stand on thrown objects as well as throw enemies was removed. Players could no longer enter through doorways in levels and a new gimmick was added that would cause walls and ladders to appear if the player walked on their invisible activation space. Also added were bonus stages between levels which consisted of a linear path where the player picks up golden boxes which would increase their score.

== Reception ==
Reception

Review scores
Publication	Score
Computer and Video Games	GB: 85/100
Games-X	4.5/5
Amstrad Action	CPC: 94%
Play Time	PC: 73%

Award
Publication	Award
Amstrad Action	Mastergame

Power Unlimited gave the Game Boy version a review score of 80% and praised the game commenting: "Titus the Fox is an inventive little platform game full of surprises. The picture is clear, and you can even play it in pairs. Well suited for the Game Boy."
