= Cresus =

2005 French quiz show

Cresus

Crésus was the first French version of the Argentine quiz show El Legado that debuted on commercial station TF1 on July 4, 2005, presented by Vincent Lagaf'. Following a strong summer ratings run, the show was recommissioned, and began its second run in January 2006. Its third and final run ended at the beginning of September 2006.

The show's name was derived from a French proverb, to be 'riche comme Crésus'. Croesus was a notoriously wealthy king of Lydia from 561/560 to 547 BC, and participates in the show as a resurrected, computer-generated skeleton that interjects insults and additional knowledge alongside Lagaf'.

The second French adaptation of El Legado is Les 12 Coups de midi, which premiered June 28, 2010 on TF1.

== Format of the show ==
Each player is given €50,000 before Round 1, "L'une ou l'autre" (One or The Other) in series 1 & 3 - renamed "La Réponse Masquée" (Hidden Answer) in series 2 - where each player is given a question along with an answer; the player must decide whether the correct answer is the one they've been provided or the second answer yet to be revealed. An incorrect answer means the player loses a life; a second incorrect answer means they face the 'Duel', where they must nominate a player to answer a multiple choice question, the difficulty of which varies according to the contestant's choice of a random A-B-C element. If they get it right, they stay in the game and their opponent is eliminated, along with seizing whatever sum of money was in the opponent's pot, and vice versa should the contestant get it wrong.

Round 2 comprises "La Patate Chaude" (Hot Potato) - "Le Cadeau Empoisonné" (Tainted Gift) in series 2 - "Ça passe ou ça casse" (Make or Break) in series 3 - each contestant receives three answers to a question without seeing the question itself; having seen the answers, they decide if they want to play that question; if not, they designate another player to answer it; should that player get it right, the player that passed loses a life; an incorrect answer at any point loses a life, also; two lost lives lead to a 'Duel' once again. In series 3, the format is inversed: the question is given to the player, who has to guess the correct answer.

Round 3 comprises "La Décharge Électrique" (Electric Shock) in series 1 & 3 - "La Mort Subite" (Sudden Death) in series 2 - the three remaining contestants are provided with 10 answers to a question. One of them is wrong; contestants take it in turns to keep giving answers until someone opts for the one incorrect option, leading to an instant 'Duel'.

"La Demi-Finale" sees the two remaining contestants given 70 seconds each, and are asked quick fire multiple choice questions on an alternating basis (i.e. once contestant A has given their correct answer, contestant B will be asked their question); their respective clocks stop as soon as they've given a correct answer, and keep running until they have given a correct answer to a question; the first person to run out of time loses. In addition, if one contestant's clock falls below three seconds, the other contestant can win by giving one more correct answer while saving more time on their own clock. The winner does not accumulate the prize money of the loser in the semifinal, however, meaning the maximum prize money is €200,000.

"La Finale" consists of five multiple choice questions, all with five responses: the first three questions offer a second attempt at the answer if the contestant opts for an incorrect option; the first answer must be taken on the final two questions. All the answers are revealed one after the other at the end of the show - four correct answers wins the contestant €2,000 and the chance to play again the following day. A full five correct answers wins the jackpot.

== Trivia ==
- TF1's working title for Crésus was L'héritage, spawned by the Italian version of the show L'eredità (which translates as 'The Inheritance'), on which the French production is heavily based.
- The show's title was shortened at the last minute from Riche comme Crésus to simply Crésus - the former how the show was referred to in some TV listings publications throughout its run.
- Lagaf' pitched four formats of his own to TF1 before agreeing to host Crésus - one of which was a reworked version of the UK game show Play Your Cards Right.
- Since 28 June 2010, the show is renewed under the name Les 12 coups de midi (The Stroke of Midday), aired daily at 12:00 AM on TF1 and hosted by Jean-Luc Reichmann, with almost unchanged rules. The Cresus' skeleton is replaced by a fairy named Eulalie. A sole addition is the final Étoile Mystérieuse (Mysterious Star), in which a small fragment of an hidden picture is revealed every day. The contestant has to guess which star is on the picture. Additionally, the final contestant of a show comes to play again on the next show.

== See also ==
- List of French Adaptations of Television Series from Other Countries
