= List of French adaptations of television series from other countries =

This list is for television series that have been produced by France and are adapted from one or more series originally produced in a country besides France. For original live-action French series, see: List of French television series, and for original animated series from France, see: List of French animated television series.

== Comedy ==
Title	Year	Country	Country of Original Program	Summary
Le Bureau	2006	France	United Kingdom	French version of the popular British television series, The Office.
Scènes de ménages	2009–present	France	Spain	Based on the 2007–2011 Spanish series, Escenas de Matrimonio.
Totale impro	2005–2006	France	Germany	France's version of Germany's improvised situation comedy, Schillerstraße.
Un gars, une fille	1999–2003	France	Canada	France's version of Quebec, Canada's 1997–2002 series, Un gars, une fille.
Fraggle Rock	1983–1987	France	Canada	France's version of Jim Henson's 1983 show, Fraggle Rock.

== Comedy-Drama ==
Title	Year	Country	Country of Original Program	Summary
Doc Martin	2011–2015	France	United Kingdom	French adaptation of the 2004–present British television series, Doc Martin.
WorkinGirls	2012–2016	France	Netherlands	French adaptation of the 2008–present Dutch series, Toren C. About six women who work in an office. Karine, the sadistic boss, who hates minorities. Hélène, a recluse who tells lies to get friends. Déborah has had complaints made against her for sexual harassment. Nathalie has many children. The lazy receptionists, both named Sophie, are rude to the clients and critical of their coworkers.

== Game Show ==
Title	Year	Country	Country of Original Program	Summary
1 contre 100	2007–2008	France	Netherlands	This is the first French version of the 1 vs. 100 international game show franchise created by Dutch company, Endemol.
60 secondes chrono	2012–2013	France	Sweden	French version of the international game show Minute to Win It. Although the American version of the show was the first to air on television, the original concept was developed and licensed by the Swedish company Friday TV.
Au pied du mur!	2012–2014	France	Netherlands	This is the second French version of the 1 vs. 100 international game show franchise created by Dutch company, Endemol. Au pied du mur! varies more from the original concept than its predecessor 1 contre 100, France's first version of 1 vs. 100.
C'est beau la vie	1986	France	United States	France's first version of the American series, Family Feud. This version only ran from February to June 1986.
Crésus	2005–2006	France	Argentina	The first French remake of Argentina's 2002–present quiz show El legado (English Title: The Legacy).
Des Copains en or	1996–1997	France	United States	France's third version of the American series, Family Feud.
Intervilles	1962–present	France	Italy	Adapted from Italy's 1959–1962 quiz show, Campanile sera.
Le Cube	2013	France	United Kingdom	French adaptation of the 2009–present British series, The Cube.
Le Juste Prix	1987–2002 and 2009–2015	France	United States	French version of the American game show The Price Is Right. From December 31, 2001 to January 19, 2002 the show was aired under the title Le Juste Euro.
Les Douze Coups de Midi	2010–present	France	Argentina	The second French remake of Argentina's 2002–present quiz show El legado (English Title: The Legacy).
Les Mariés de l'A2	1987–1992	France	United States	First French remake of the 1966–2013 American series, The Newlywed Game. The second French adaptation is Les Z'Amours.
Les Z'Amours	1995–2021	France	United States	Second French remake of the 1966–2013 American series, The Newlywed Game. The first French adaptation was Les Mariés de l'A2.
Money Drop	2011–2017	France	United Kingdom	French adaptation of the 2010–present British series The Million Pound Drop. Which is a game show that quizzes contestants on current events.
Mot de passe	2009–2016	France	United States	France's adaptation of the 2008–2009 USA show, Million Dollar Password.
N'oubliez pas les paroles!	2007–present	France	United States	French version of the American international game show franchise Don't Forget the Lyrics!.
N'oubliez pas votre brosse à dents	1994–1996	France	United Kingdom	Adapted from the original 1994–1995 British series, Don't Forget Your Toothbrush.
Personne n'y avait pensé !	2011–2021	France	United Kingdom	French version of Britain's 2009–present series, Pointless.
Questions pour un champion	1988–present	France	United Kingdom	First French adaptation of the original 1987–1996 British quiz series Going for Gold.
Questions pour un super champion	2006–present	France	United Kingdom	Second French adaptation of the original 1987–1996 British quiz series Going for Gold. This version plays Saturdays.
Qui veut gagner des millions?	2000–present	France	United Kingdom	French version of the international game show Who Wants to Be a Millionaire? which is of UK origin.
Une famille en or	1990–2017 and 2021–present	France	United States	France's second and longest running version of the American series, Family Feud.

== Police/Crime Drama ==
Title	Year	Country	Country of Original Program	Summary
Falco	2013–2016	France	Germany	French adaptation of the German police drama Der letzte Bulle (lit. The Last Cop). Lieutenant Alexandre Falco is shot in the head in the year 1991. Twenty-two years later he awakes from his coma and, refusing retirement, returns to active duty.
Paris enquêtes criminelles	2007–2008	France	United States	French adaptation of the 2001–2011 American police drama, Law & Order: Criminal Intent.
R.I.S, police scientifique	2006–2014	France	Italy	(lit. R.I.S, scientific police) French remake of the Italian original, RIS Delitti Imperfetti, which concentrates on the scientific side of crime investigation.
Tunnel	2013–2018	France; United Kingdom	Denmark; Sweden	Known in English as The Tunnel. French-British adaptation of the 2011 to present Danish-Swedish series, The Bridge (Danish: Broen; Swedish: Bron).

== Reality Show ==
Title	Year	Country	Country of Original Program	Summary
Bachelor, le gentleman célibataire	2003–2005, 2013 – 2016	France	United States	French version of the original American series, The Bachelor.
Baby Boom	2011–present	France	United Kingdom	Based on the original British series, One Born Every Minute.
Bienvenue chez nous	2012–present	France	United Kingdom	The 2010–present British series, Four in a Bed, remade for French television.
Cauchemar en cuisine	2011–present	France	United Kingdom	French adaptation of the 2004–2014 original British series, Ramsay's Kitchen Nightmares.
Coup de foudre au prochain village	2013	France	Norway	France's version of the Norwegian format, Babes on a Bus, that first aired in 2011 on Norway's TVNorge as Gøy på landet.
Cuisine impossible	2019–2021	France	Germany	Cooking competition show based on the 2014–present German series, Kitchen Impossible.
Danse avec les stars	2011–present	France	United Kingdom	The French version of the British series, Strictly Come Dancing.
Ice Show	2013	France	United Kingdom	Adapted from the UK's Dancing on Ice. Four of the biggest names in French figure-skating, Philippe Candeloro, Surya Bonaly, Gwendal Peizerat and Sarah Abitbol each head a team of two celebrities and their professional figure-skating partners as they compete before judges.
Koh-Lanta	2001–present	France	United Kingdom	French version of the Survivor series. Although the Swedish version of the show, Expedition Robinson, was the first to air on television, the format for Survivor was created by British television producer Charlie Parsons for Planet 24, a British television production company.
L'amour est dans le pré	2006–present	France	United Kingdom	(lit. love is in the meadow) Adaptation of the 2001-2009 British series, Farmer Wants a Wife.
La Belle et ses princes presque charmants	2012–2014	France	United States	(lit. Beauty and her almost charming princes) French adaptation of the American 2003–2005, Average Joe, a television series in which a group of men with poor social skills and less than ideal appearance compete for the affections of a beauty queen. Halfway through each season more attractive men are added to the competition.
La France a un incroyable talent	2006–present	France	United Kingdom	(lit. France has incredible talent) French adaptation of the British series, Britain's Got Talent. The show airs weekly on M6.
La Meilleure Boulangerie de France	2013–present	France	United Kingdom	France's adaptation of the British 2012–2014 series, Britain's Best Bakery.
Le Meilleur pâtissier	2012–present	France	United Kingdom	(lit. The Best Baker) French adaptation of the original 2010–present British series, The Great British Bake Off.
Loft Story	2001–2002	France	Netherlands	A French reworking of the original Dutch series, Big Brother. Inspired the French Canadian series of the same name. There is also a second French adaptation of Big Brother named Secret Story.
MasterChef	2010–2015, 2022	France	United Kingdom	The French version of the UK original series, MasterChef, which premiered in 1990.
Nouvelle Star	2003–2017	France	United Kingdom	France's version of the original 2001–2003 British series, Pop Idol, which spawned the Idols TV series international franchise.
Popstars	2001–2013	France	New Zealand	Musical reality series based on the New Zealand original, Popstars.
Quatre marriages pour une lune de miel	2011–present	France	United Kingdom	(lit. Four weddings for one honeymoon) French version of the British's 2009–2013 series, Four Weddings.
Rising Star	2014	France	Israel	Not to be confused with the American series of the same name which started the same year, Rising Star. Both series were based on the Israeli series, HaKokhav HaBa, which began a year earlier.
Secret Story	2007–2017	France	Netherlands	This is France's second adaptation of the original Dutch series, Big Brother. The first French reworking of Big Brother is Loft Story.
Splash : le grand plongeon	2013	France	Netherlands	French version of the international franchise, Celebrity Splash!, which was created by the Dutch production company, Eyeworks.
Star Academy	2002–2009, 2012	France	Spain	French adaptation of the original Spanish series, Star Academy, named Operación Triunfo (lit. Operation Triumph).
The Best, le meilleur artiste	2013–2014	France	Netherlands	French adaptation of Dutch company, Endemol's, 2012 series Beat the Best that played on RTL 4.
The Voice: la plus belle voix	2012–present	France	Netherlands	(lit. The Voice: the most beautiful voice) French adaptation of the original Dutch series, The Voice of Holland and is part of The Voice TV series franchise.
Top Chef	2010–present	France; Belgium	United States	Franco-Belgian adaptation of the American reality show of the same name.
Un air de star	2013	France	Netherlands	French version of the international reality television franchise, Your Face Sounds Familiar, created by Dutch production company Endemol. The first version of this franchise to air was the Spanish show, Tu cara me suena.
Un dîner presque parfait	2014–present	France	United Kingdom	Adapted from the 2005–present British series, Come Dine with Me.

== See also ==
- Cinema of France
- Culture of France
- List of French television series
- List of French animated television series
- List of French-language films
- Lists of French films
