= Les Douze Coups de midi =

French TV Show

Les Douze Coups de midi (previously called Les 12 Coups de midi, transl. "The twelve strokes of midday") is a French game show hosted by Jean-Luc Reichmann and broadcast everyday on TF1 since June 28th 2010.

== History ==
Les Douze Coups de midi is an adaptation from the Argentine show El Legado on Telefe (the first version was named Crésus, broadcast in 2005 and 2006 on TF1 and hosted by Vincent Lagaf'). This show consists of an individual quiz which can lead to winning numerous prizes and a jackpot.

== Broadcasting ==
This game was broadcast on TF1 to collect the midday audience, as a response to the success of Tout le monde veut prendre sa place, a game show broadcast at the same time on France 2.

Since October 2010, Jean-Luc Reichmann has hosted the game with a virtual character, a fairy called Eulalie (voice by Véronique Le Nir). Later, this fairy became a simple voiceover, but kept her name and her voice actor before her replacement by Zette which is voiced by Isabelle Benhadj.

From May 12, 2020 to October 9, 2021, to respect safety measures due to the COVID-19 pandemic in France, the show was broadcast without audience, and a new character, Docteur Maboul, made his appearance. His role is to clean up the candidates' desks.

== Description ==
The winner of the show, now Maître de midi (transl. "Master of Midday"), puts his title on the table to try and win more prizes until his elimination.

At the end of the show, each correct answer reveals one tile on a rectangle of 13x10 tiles hiding hints for the discovery of a celebrity. Since January 27, 2023, only a "coup de maître" (transl. "Master's stroke") with five correct answers lets the Master of Midday make a guess, to try to win the jackpot.

The show has known some evolutions since its creation. Since January 2018, the last round "L'étoile mystérieuse" (transl. "The Mysterious Star") was made harder by replacing the celebrity's picture by a number of hints, leading to guess said celebrity. The last four tiles hide this celebrity.

== Visual identity ==
From September 2016 to September 2019, for the 100th mysterious star, the show changed its logo and artistic direction.

In September 2019, the show changed its studio, its logo and its artistic direction.

The logo changes color for certain vacation or holiday periods. Fir example, the logo becomes red during Christmas and New Year (golden in winter 2023), and golden and yellow (pink in 2022) during the summer. Starting in 2023, the logo turns green for the fall and changes to orange for Halloween.

== Audiences ==
- On June 28, 2010, the launch of the game was welcomed by 2.9 million people with a peak at 4.6 million at the end.
- After a decrease in September 2010, around 2.3 million people were watching from home. The numbers went up again in October, and stabilized at more than 3 million.
- Ever since then, the game regularly gains audience, with a peak at 4.5 million on February 1, 2011. It is the leader at this time of the day.
- On December 26, 2016, no less than 4.73 million people watched the show, with a peak of 6.5 million in the end.
- In April 2019, following the Quesada scandal, audience decreased before coming back to normal shortly thereafter.
- On July 6, 2025, 4.98 million people watched the show and 7.1 million at the elimination of Émilien.

== Records ==
Émilien holds the record for victories in the history of television games in the world.

He also holds the show's winnings record and is the biggest winner in the history of French game shows in terms of winnings, ahead of Bruno Hourcade with €1,026,107 and a Who Wants to be a Millionaire contestant named Marie-Hélène who won €1,000,000 in the show on August 27, 2004

=== Ranking ===
The next list ranked the twenty best contestants as number of successive appearances.

Legend	Contestants ranked 1st, 2nd and 3rd.	Contestant still in the game

#	Contestant	Participations	Global money	Debut appearance	Final appearance	Master strokes	Stars
1	Émilien	647	€2,566,931	September 25, 2023	July 6, 2025	193	23
2	Bruno (Fifou Dingo)	252	€1,026,107	January 20, 2021	October 5, 2021	92	9
3	Éric	199	€921,316	November 21, 2019	June 19, 2020	62	7
4	Christian	193	€809,392	July 4, 2016	January 14, 2017	64	7
5	Paul	153	€691,522	April 29, 2019	October 10, 2019	59	6
6	Stéphane	153	€568,343	August 20, 2022	January 20, 2023	44	5
7	Céline	125	€489,495	March 14, 2023	July 24, 2023	37	4
8	Véronique	100	€447,226	April 5, 2018	July 21, 2018	39	4
9	Léo	98	€410,591	August 31, 2020	December 6, 2020	31	4
10	Timothée	83	€353,348	March 24, 2017	June 14, 2017	29	3
11	Benoît	82	€397,946	January 18, 2019	April 9, 2019	28	3
12	Bruno (Lille)	80	€393,650	August 8, 2013	October 26, 2013	34	3
13	Xavier	76	€335,856	January 5, 2013	March 21, 2013	32	3
14	Alexandre	75	€417,828	November 12, 2010	January 25, 2011	37	5
15	Sylvain	75	€335,593	April 26, 2015	July 15, 2015	30	4
16	Lucia	73	€380,670	April 13, 2012	June 24, 2012	30	5
17	Laurent	72	€310,607	January 13, 2022	March 25, 2022	20	3
18	Cyrille	71	€356,186	February 12, 2011	April 23, 2011	28	4
19	Sébastien	68	€233,626	October 16, 2012	December 23, 2012	20	3
20	Vincent	62	€253,442	February 8, 2014	April 10, 2014	22	3
