= Samira Lui =

Italian showgirl and model (born 1998)

- Born: 6 March 1998 (age 28); San Daniele del Friuli, Friuli-Venezia Giulia, Italy
- Occupations: Television personality; model
- Height: 1.78 m (5 ft 10 in)
- Partner: Luigi Punzo (2018–present)

Samira Lui (born 6 March 1998) is an Italian television personality and model.

== Life and career ==
Born in San Daniele del Friuli to an Italian mother and a Senegalese father whom she never knew, she grew up with her mother in Colloredo di Monte Albano.

In 2013, at the age of fifteen, she won the Miss Blumare title. After graduating as a surveyor, she moved to Milan, working in the meantime as a hostess for conferences and trade fairs.

In 2017, she participated in the Miss Italia pageant, placing third; her participation was accompanied by some controversy regarding her multi-ethnic appearance and Senegalese origins.

In September 2021, for two seasons, she played the role of "professor" on the Rai 1 quiz show L'eredità. In May 2022, she participated as a hostess at the David di Donatello ceremony, hosted by Carlo Conti and Drusilla Foer. That same year, she was a contestant on the twelfth season of the prime-time talent show Tale e quale show, finishing in ninth place overall.

In 2023, she participated in the seventeenth season of the Canale 5 reality show Grande Fratello, being eliminated during the twelfth episode.

Since 2024, she has been a co-host for the game show La ruota della fortuna, hosted primarily by Gerry Scotti, broadcast on Canale 5.

== Personal life ==
Since 2018, Lui has been romantically linked to Neapolitan former model and entrepreneur Luigi Punzo. She is a supporter of soccer club Udinese.

== Television programs ==
Year	Title	Network	Role	Notes
2017	Miss Italia	La7	Contestant	Beauty contest
2021–2023	L'eredità	Rai 1	Professor	Game show
2022	David di Donatello	Rai 1	Showgirl	Annual Award (season 67)
2022	Tale e quale show	Rai 1	Contestant	Talent show (season 12)
2023	Grande Fratello	Canale 5	Contestant	Reality show (season 17)
2024–present	La ruota della fortuna	Canale 5	Co-host	Game show

== Filmography ==
=== Film ===
Year	Title	Role	Notes
2025	Din Don – Paesani spaesati	"Sheikh's" Companion	TV film

=== Music videos ===
Year	Title	Artist
2024	"Rosa tormento"	Cristiano Malgioglio
