= Bo le lavabo =

"Bo le lavabo (WC Kiss)"

Single by Lagaf'

from the album Le Lavabo
- Released: March 1990
- Recorded: 1989
- Genre: House
- Length: 3:50
- Label: Flarenasch
- Songwriters: Lil Louis; B. Bayle; Lagaf'

Lagaf' singles chronology
"Bo le lavabo (WC Kiss)" (1990)	"La Zoubida" (1991)

"Bo le lavabo (WC Kiss)" is a 1990 novelty song recorded by the French TV presenter and humorist Lagaf'. It was his debut single and achieved success in France.

== Background and writing ==
In one of his sketches, French humorist Vincent Lagaf' (Vincent Rouil), who featured on several TV programs in the 1980s and 1990s, commented on how easy it was to produce a hit single during the house period, as the repetitive music distracts the audience from the words, reduced to a bare and trivial content. As the sketch had a great success, he decided to release it as an unpretentious but ironic single, built with deliberately very poor lyrics: in the song, Lagaf' explains that, to produce a hit every year, it is enough to barely change the words: the first year, he can sing "il est beau le lavabo" ("the sink is beautiful"), the second year, "il est laid le bidet" ("the bidet is ugly"), and the third year, he mixes both versions. The music uses a sample recorded by Lil Louis from his song "French Kiss", which was released in 1989.

After this unexpected success, Lagaf' released a new single the following year, "La Zoubida", which was even more successful than "Bo le lavabo (WC Kiss)", as it was number one for 11 weeks.

== Chart performances ==
In France, "Bo le lavabo (WC Kiss)" debuted at number 40 of the chart edition of 24 March 1990, then climbed regularly on the chart and eventually reached number one in its 13th week, dislodging Elton John's hit "Sacrifice", but was replaced the next week at this position by Zouk Machine's summer hit "Maldòn' (la musique dans la peau)". It cumulated 18 weeks in the top ten and fell off the top 50 after 28 weeks. The single was certified Gold disc by the Syndicat National de l'Édition Phonographique, the French certificator, for 400,000 units.

On the European Hot 100 Singles, "Bo le lavabo (WC Kiss)" charted for 24 weeks, nine of them in the top 20. It debuted at number 81 on 28 April 1990 and reached number seven in its tenth week of presence.

== Formats and track listings ==
- CD single
1. "Bo le lavabo (WC Kiss)" — 3:50
2. "Bo le lavabo (WC Kiss)" (bonus) — 1:00
3. "Bo le lavabo (WC Kiss)" (forbidden version) — 5:00
- 7" single
1. "Bo le lavabo (WC Kiss)" — 3:50
2. "Bo le lavabo (WC Kiss)" (forbidden version) — 5:00
- 12" maxi
1. "Bo le lavabo (WC Kiss)" — 3:50
2. "Bo le lavabo (WC Kiss)" (bonus) — 1:00
3. "Bo le lavabo (WC Kiss)" (forbidden version) — 5:00

== Charts ==
=== Peak positions ===
Chart (1990)	Peak position
Europe (European Hot 100)	7
France (SNEP)	1

=== Year-end charts ===
Chart (1990)	Position
Europe (Eurochart Hot 100)	28

=== Certifications ===
Certifications for "Bo la lavabo (WC Kiss)"
Region	Certification	Certified units/sales
France (SNEP)	Gold	400,000^{*}
^{*} Sales figures based on certification alone.

== See also ==
- List of number-one singles of 1990 (France)
