= Catherine Benguigui =

French actress and television personality

- Born: Paris, France
- Occupations: Actress, Television personality
- Years active: 1992–present

Catherine Benguigui (born 1964) is a French actress and television personality.

== Personal life ==
She is the daughter of Elie Benguigui.

== Television ==
Year	Show	Channel	Notes
1995–98	Cnet	Canal+	
2005	Totale impro	M6	with Benjamin Castaldi
2009	L'habit ne fait pas Lemoine	France 2	with Jean-Luc Lemoine
2010–11	Le Bureau des Plaintes	France 2	with Jean-Luc Lemoine
2020	Tomorrow Is Ours	TF1	

== Radio ==
Year	Show	Channel	Notes
2011	Après la plage	Europe 1	with Wendy Bouchard & Emmanuel Maubert

== Filmography ==
Year	Title	Role	Director	Notes
1992	Sam suffit	Town Hall's employee	Virginie Thévenet	
1996	Combats de femme	Prefecture's agent	Pascale Bailly	TV series (2 episodes)
1997	Francorusse	The cop	Alexis Miansarow	
1998	La voie est libre	Myriam	Stéphane Clavier	
1998–2000	H	Béatrice Goldberg	Édouard Molinaro, Éric Lartigau, ...	TV series (40 episodes)
1999	The Ninth Gate	The concierge	Roman Polanski	
1999	Merci mon chien	Elodie	Philippe Galland	
2000	Kitchendales	The neighbor	Chantal Lauby	
2001	De l'amour	Lady with the dog	Jean-François Richet	
2001	Gamer	Dietetician	Patrick Levy	
2001	La concierge est dans l'ascenseur	The concierge	Olivier Coussemacq	Short
2001	Les rencontres de Joëlle	Pauline	Patrick Poubel	TV movie
2002	Caméra café	Mireille	Francis Duquet	TV series (1 episode)
2002	Avocats & associés	Sophie	Christian Bonnet	TV series (1 episode)
2003	La Beuze	The artistic director	François Desagnat & Thomas Sorriaux	
2003	Rien que du bonheur	The psy	Denis Parent	
2004	Le carton	The guardian	Charles Nemes	
2007	Un admirateur secret	Juliette	Christian Bonnet	TV movie
2009–10	Plus belle la vie	Violette Garcin	Christophe Reichert, Emmanuel Rigaut, ...	TV series (7 episodes)
2010	L'enfance du mal	The clerk	Olivier Coussemacq	
2010	Fais pas ci, fais pas ça	The ANPE employee	Alexandre Pidoux	TV series (1 episode)
2010	Au siècle de Maupassant	Adélaïde	Philippe Bérenger	TV series (1 episode)
2011	Midnight in Paris	Maxim's Hostess	Woody Allen	
2011	Platane	Herself	Éric Judor & Denis Imbert	TV series (1 episode)
2012	Mes amis, mes amours, mes emmerdes	The headmaster	Jérôme Navarro	TV series (1 episode)
2013	La grande peinture	The journalist	Laurent Heynemann	TV movie
2013	Y'a pas d'âge	Madame Grognard	Vincent Puybaret	TV series (1 episode)
2013–16	Lanester	Dr. Irène Massoni	Franck Mancuso	TV series (2 episodes)
2015	Joséphine, ange gardien	Cathy Rousseau	Pascal Heylbroeck	TV series (1 episode)
2015	Commissaire Magellan	Madame Pondier	François Guérin	TV series (1 episode)
2016	Ma famille t'adore déjà	Gisèle	Jérôme Commandeur & Alan Corno	
2018	Les déguns	The judge	Cyrille Droux & Claude Zidi Jr.	
2020	Trop jeune pour moi	Muriel		TV movie
2021	Scènes de ménages	Catherine		TV series (1 episode)
