= Patrick Roy (TV presenter) =

French television presenter

- Born: Patrick Boyard; April 17, 1952; Niort, Deux-Sèvres, France
- Died: February 18, 1993 (aged 40); Villejuif, Val-de-Marne, France
- Occupation(s): Radio presenter, television presenter
- Years active: 1977–92
- Television: Le Juste Prix; Une famille en or Intervilles; Succès fous

Patrick Boyard, known as Patrick Roy (April 17, 1952 – February 18, 1993), was a French radio and television presenter.

== Life and career ==
=== Radio career and television beginnings ===
In 1976, Patrick Roy graduated from the École Française d'Attachés de Presse. From 1977 to 1992, he hosted the radio programs Vanille Fraise, Passé-Présent, Destination bonheur and Bienvenue à bord on RMC.

In the meantime, he appeared in 1982 in the television program Les Fugues à Fugain hosted by Michel Fugain on TF1 and on Cadence 3 on FR3 with Guy Lux.

=== Career on TF1 ===
He joined TF1 in 1987. He replaced intermittently Éric Galliano on Les Grandes Oreilles and the hosted L'Affaire est dans le sac from October 1987 to June 1988. He became very popular hosting on the same channel Le Juste Prix (French version of The Price Is Right) from July 1988 to November 1992 and Une famille en or (French version of Family Feud) from July 1990 to October 1992.

From 1990 to 1992, he co-hosted with Philippe Risoli and Christian Morin the variety program Succès fous, in which a number of famous bands and singers appeared as guests. During summer 1991, he co-hosted Intervilles (French version of It's a Knockout) with Philippe Risoli and Guy Lux.

=== Anecdote with Patrick Sébastien ===
In 1992, in a broadcast of the game show Une famille en or, he was victim of a hoax organised by Patrick Sébastien disguised as a contestant, confronting and tricking him during the game. He is among the celebrities (especially presenters of TF1) who were tricked by Partick Sébastien in the program Le Grand Bluff broadcast on December 26, 1992.

== Death and tribute ==
In October 1992, Patrick Roy was diagnosed with cancer and was sent to the hospital. Philippe Risoli replaced him to host Le Juste Prix on November 10 of that year.

He died on February 18, 1993, of bone cancer in Villejuif in the Val-de-Marne. As a very popular presenter, the tribute of TF1 during the Journal de 20 heures made the record audience of the year. The channel also broadcast all episodes of the variety program Succès fous during summer 1993.

He is buried in Saint-Benoît in the department of Vienne where his parents live.

In memory of their child, his parents published a book titled Patrick Roy, écrit par Colette et Pierre Boyard, prefaced by Jean-Pierre Foucault.

== Television programs ==
- 1987 : Les Grandes Oreilles (TF1)
- 1987–88 : L'Affaire est dans le sac (TF1)
- 1988–92 : Le Juste Prix (TF1)
- 1990–92 : Succès fous (TF1)
- 1990–92 : Une famille en or (TF1)
- 1991 : Intervilles (TF1)
