= Chen Beibei =

Chinese television presenter

- 陈蓓蓓
- Born: February 11, 1980 (age 45); Jiujiang, Jiangxi, China
- Occupation: Television presenter
- Years active: 2002-present
- Notable work: The hostess of Time No.1 and Is It True on CCTV-2
- Television: Time No.1 and Is It True
- Awards: "The Best Entertainment Hostess" award of the 3rd Asia Rainbow TV Award

Chen Beibei (Chinese: 陈蓓蓓; pinyin: Chén Bèibèi; born February 11, 1980) is a television presenter for CCTV. She is from Jiujiang, Jiangxi, China. In 2002, she became a hostess after graduating from Communication University of China.

In 2005, she began to host financial informative program Time No.1. On April 16, 2013, she began to host interactive truth-seeking program Is It True.

== Career ==
In 2002, Chen Beibei practiced in program Live on CCTV-2 after graduating from Communication University of China. In 2003, she hosted Fine Living in Beijing on BTV-7.

In 2005, she began to host financial informative program Time No.1. She also hosted food program National Television Cooking Arena Match. After that, she hosted food program Food Guest with Zhu Yi. She also hosted program Shopping Street.

In October 2010, she hosted shopping program Fashion Shopping on CCTV-2.

Chen beibei hosts interactive truth-seeking program Is It True since April 16, 2013.

== Personal life ==
On August 8, 2011, Chen Beibei gave birth to her twin daughters.

== Discography ==
| Year | Program Name | TV Channel | References |
|---|---|---|---|
| 2003-2005 | Fine Living in Beijing | BTV-7 | |
| 2003 | Eastern Golf | Shanghai Television | |
| 2005–present | Time No.1 | CCTV-2 | |
| 2005-2010 | National Television Cooking Arena Match | CCTV-2 | |
| 2005-2011 | Shopping Street | CCTV-2 | |
| 2010-2013 | Fashion Shopping | CCTV-2 | |
| 2013–present | Is It True | CCTV-2 | |
| 2015 | CCTV 3.15 Evening | CCTV-1 | |

== Awards ==
In November 2016, Chen Beibei won award "The Best Entertainment Hostess" of the 3rd Asia Rainbow TV Award.
