= Le Juste Prix =

- Logo of Le Juste Prix 2024.
- Created by: Bob Stewart
- Presented by: Max Meynier; Eric Galliano; Patrick Roy; Philippe Risoli; Vincent Lagaf'; Éric Antoine
- Announcer: Gérard Vives; Le Baron (Jean Marc Lancelot); Philippe Rambaud; Vincent Piguet
- Country of origin: France
- No. of episodes: 5,425

Production
- Producer: FremantleMedia (2009–)
- Running time: 60 mins (inc. adverts) (1988–2001; 2024-present); 35mins (1987–2001; 2009–2015)

Original release
- Network: TF1
- Release: December 13, 1987 – August 31, 2001
- Release: July 27, 2009 – April 10, 2015
- Network: M6
- Release: March 11, 2024 – present

Related
- The Price Is Right (American version)

Le Juste Prix ("The Right Price") is a French adaptation of the American game show The Price Is Right that first aired on TF1. It premiered in 1987 and ran until the original version was canceled in 2001. In 2002 a brief sequel, Le Juste Euro ("The Euro is Right"), ran on France 2 and was hosted by Patrice Laffont, it only ran for two episodes. On July 27, 2009, a new version of Le Juste Prix premiered on TF1. This version, which aired for six years, was hosted by Vincent Lagaf with Gerard Vivès as announcer. On March 11, 2024 a new version of the show premiered on M6. It is hosted by Éric Antoine and narrated by Vincent Piguet.

== 1987–2001 ==
While all price elements were intact, the series utilized format changes that were exclusive and unique to this version. Here is a list of the format changes:

1987–88: Airing only on Sunday, this format featured three pricing games, and used the Big Wheel (La Roue) to determine the two Showcase (La Vitrine) players, with players spinning only once. A variation of this format would be used on the German version of The Price Is Right, when it premiered in 1989.

1988–2000: The format most fans are familiar with, the show expanded to seven days a week. On the Monday-Saturday shows, the show used the 1987 format, but there was only one La Roue winner; that person moved on to the Sunday finals; that used the traditional hour-long format, with the two La Roue winners advancing to La Vitrine. Since 1995, 100 on the wheel in one spin won a bonus of 1,000F (€152) which increased with each spin of the wheel.

1998–2000: Starting in 1998, the daily winners got a chance to win a trip, by playing a version of Clock Game called "Le Grand Voyage", in which the player has 20 seconds to guess the price of the trip. This game moved to the regular lineup in 2000.

2000–01: Losing the weekend airings, the new Monday-Friday shows kept the hour format, but the two La Roue winners faced off in a new La Vitrine, a hybrid of the U.S. and European Showcase formats. The top winner stopped a range finder with values ranging from 5,000F (€762) to 30,000F (€4,573). A single Showcase (usually over 100,000F [€15,244]) was presented; both players bid on it, and the one closest to the actual retail price and within range without going over won.

In the final season, when the euro was coming into effect, all games gave their prizes and prices in both francs and euros.

=== Pricing Games ===
The name of the original pricing game in the US version is given in parentheses. Many of these follow the same rules and gameplay as the US version; for details, see List of The Price Is Right pricing games.

==== 1987-1998 ====
- La tirelire (Any Number; last number in the car's price is given for free)
- Le jeu de cartes (Card Game)
- Le tyrolien (Cliff Hangers; mountain steps are 0F-250F [€38])
- Les 30 secondes (Clock Game)
- Le prix interdit (Danger Price)
- Le jeu de dés (Dice Game)
- Le vrai ou faux (Five Price Tags)
- La caisse enregistreuse (Grocery Game; range to win is 95-99F [€14.48-€15.09])
- Un zéro de plus (Grand Game)
- Le dessus-dessous (Hi-Lo)
- Le mini-golf (Hole in One)
- Le Joker (Joker)
- Le quitte ou double (It's in the Bag; top prize of 32,000F [€4,878])
- Les 10 billets (Lucky Seven; played with 10 tickets instead of 7F)
- Les Clés de la Fortune (Master Key)
- Les 3 tiers (Money Game; played for a six-digit prize; players must the three pairs of numbers that make up the price)
- Le téléphone en or (The Phone Home Game; top prize of 50,000F)
- Le fakir (Plinko; top prize of 100,000F, board is 500F-1,000F-2,000F-0F-20,000F-0F-2,000F-1,000F-500F [€76-€152-€304-€0-€3,040-€0-€304-€152-€76])
- Le coup de poing (Punch-A-Bunch; top prize of 50,000F [€7,622])
- Le grand prix (Race Game)
- Le fric-frac (Safe Crackers)
- Les 3 croix (Secret X)
- La balle perdue (Shell Game)
- Le coup double (Swap Meet)
- Le bouche-trou (Switcheroo; :10 time limit)
- Le couplé (Take Two; same rules, but with a slot machine motif)
- La main dans le sac (3 Strikes; played for a car and an extra prize -- the extra prize's price is what the player must fill in)

==== 1998-2001 ====
- La tirelire (Any Number)
- Le jeu de cartes (Card Game)
- Le tyrolien (Cliff Hangers)
- Les 30 secondes (Clock Game)
- La ligne de crédit (Credit Card)
- Le prix interdit (Danger Price)
- Le jeu de dés (Dice Game)
- Le vrai ou faux (Five Price Tags)
- La pochette surprise (Fortune Hunter; played for 10,000F [€1,524])
- La caisse enregistreuse (Grocery Game)
- Un zéro de plus (Grand Game)
- Le dessus-dessous (Hi-Lo)
- Le mini-golf (Hole in One)
- Le Joker (Joker)
- Le quitte ou double (It's in the Bag)
- Le roulé-boulé (Let 'em Roll)
- Les 10 billets (Lucky Seven)
- Le va et vient (Make your Move; played for a two, three, and five-digit prize)
- Les Clefs de la Fortune (Master Key)
- Les 3 tiers (Money Game)
- Un de plus, un de moins (One Away)
- La balle au centre/Le lancer franc/Les tirs au but (On The Nose; exact guess on the prize's price wins 5,000F)
- Le grand damier (Pathfinder)
- Le téléphone en or (The Phone Home Game)
- Le doublé gagnant (Pick A Pair)
- Le fakir (Plinko)
- Le coup de poing (Punch-A-Bunch)
- Le grand prix (Race Game)
- Le baromètre (Range Game)
- Le fric-frac (Safe Crackers)
- Les 3 croix (Secret X)
- La balle perdue (Shell Game)
- La douche écossaise (Shower Game)
- La superballe (Superball)
- Le coup double (Swap Meet)
- Le bouche-trou (Switcheroo)
- Le couplé (Take Two)
- La tentation (Temptation)
- Le méli-mélo (Ten Chances)
- La main dans le sac (3 Strikes)

=== Pricing games exclusive to Le Juste Prix ===
- Le code barre ("The Barcode")
- Les fléchettes ("The Darts")
- Le oui ou non ("Yes or No")
- Le distributeur ("The ATM")
- Les cerceaux
- Le ciné-quiz
- Le 50-50
- Le TV quiz
- Le Bowling (added in 1998)
- L'alarme fatale (added in 1998)
- Le Jukebox
- Le Grand Voyage

== Le Juste Euro ==
A short-lived remake of the show called Le Juste Euro (The Euro Fair) aired on France 2 hosted by Patrice Laffont with Jean-Marie Castile as the announcer from December 31, 2001 until January 19, 2002. Originally, they wanted to call it Dites-le en Euro! (Say it in Euro!) in order to separate it from Le Juste Prix.

== Le marathon des Jeux TV ==
In 2006, Le Juste Prix was part of the series called Le Marathon des Jeux TV (The Marathon of TV Games) also airing on France 2 hosted by Nagui and Pascal Sellem. This was a French adaptation of British game show Ant & Dec's/Vernon Kay's Gameshow Marathon.

== 2009–15 ==
When the series returned, it utilized one of the largest Price sets in the world, a two-story structure so big (as are some props), certain games required players to head to the second level.

The winner of La Roue played a revamped La Vitrine, an exact copy of Le Grand Voyage, except the player had 25 seconds (and a given range) to guess the price of the Showcase, which ranged from €10,000-€100,000. One Bid items also vary, ranging from at least €20 to €1,000.

In addition, the theme song was a "Whistled" remix of the theme previously used in 2001.

=== Pricing games ===
- Le fakir (Plinko; same board as the U.S. version, but the highest value is €2,000 for a top prize of €10,000)
- Le mini-golf (Hole In One)
- Le Tyrolien (Cliff Hangers)
- Les 3 Tiers (Money Game with a maximum of two mistakes instead of three to be made to win, and cash cannot be won under any circumstance)
- Le doublé gagnant (Pick A Pair)
- La balle perdue (Shell Game)
- Le grand prix (Race Game)
- Le zéro de plus (Grand Game)
- La Tirelire (Any Number; U.S. rules)
- Le roulé-boulé (Let 'em Roll; amounts of €100, €200, and €500)
- Le Joker (Joker)
- Les 7 billets (Lucky Seven)
- Les 10 chances (Ten Chances)
- La caisse enregistreuse (Grocery Game; range to win is €10-€11)
- Le temps c'est de l'argent (Time is Money with a top prize of €4,000)
- Pousse des dés (Push over, played for 3 prizes)
- C'est trop ! Stop (That's Too Much)
- Le quitte ou double (It's in the Bag; top prize of €4,000)
- Les tirs au but/Le lancer franc (On the Nose)
- Le bouche-trou (Switcheroo; :30 time limit)
- Le coup de poing (Punch-A-Bunch; top prize of €10,000)
- Les 3 croix (Secret "X"; in this version, actual people represent the "X's" & "O's")
- Le Jukebox
- Le Dessus-Dessous (Hi-Lo)
- Le Gratte-Gratte
- Le Pochette Surprise (Fortune Hunter)
- Le Fric-Frác (Safe Crackers)
- La Main dans le Sac (3 Strikes, played with slightly different rules)
- La Douche Écossaise (Shower Game)
- Las Clés de la Fortune (Master Key)
- Le Baromètre (Range Game, except that the selected range can go down)
- L' Alarme Fatale
- Le Vrai ou Faux
- Le Mini-Bar (Exclusive to this version, it plays much like Hole In One)
- Le TV quiz
- Les Citations
- Le Flipper (Exclusive to this version, it plays much like Plinko, but with a top prize of €25,000)
- Le Prix en Boite
- Quel Chantier !
- Le Brique Au Prix
- Le Bowling
- Le Prix de la Vérité (Five Price Tags; played with 4 tags)
- La Pluie de Ballons
- Le Prix Suspendu
- Le Mur de Ballons
- Boum!
- Les Pas du Gain (Pathfinder)
- Le Couloir Laser
- Les Echelles
- La Pétanque
- Le Prix Sélectif
- L'Envol des Prix
- Les Fromages
- Le Prix qui Pète
- Quelles Couleurs ?
- Le Photomaton
- A 1 Dent Près
- Le Monde à l'Envers
- Le Skate Park
- Qui s'y Frotte s'y Pique !
- Le Prix au Kilo
- Le Ping Pong
- Le Goling
- Le Labyrinthe Electrique
- Des Etages et des Prix (Pay The Rent, top prize of €5,000)
- Des Chiffres et des Prix (Cover Up, played on a digital screen with same rules)
- La Tournée du Patron (Triple Play)
- La Danse Synchro
- Le Ball-in
- Le Super Bonus
- Boule qui Roule

=== Other International versions ===
Most international versions, such as those of Australia, Bulgaria, Belgium, Lebanon, The Netherlands and Romania had their sets and logo were inspired by the 2009 French version.

== 2024- ==
After being off the air for no longer that 9 years. On February 20, 2024; it was announced that a new version of Le Juste Prix will air on rival channel M6 instead of TF1. Hosted by Éric Antoine and announced by Vincent Piguet, it premiered on March 11, 2024.

== See also ==
- List of French Adaptations of Television Series from Other Countries
