= Christophe Dechavanne =

French television and radio host (born 1958)

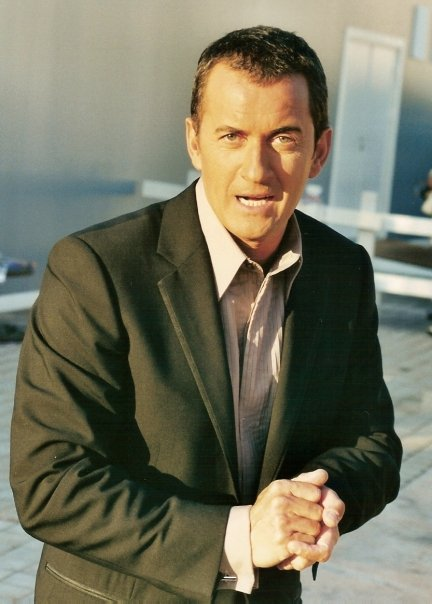
- Dechavanne in 2002
- Born: 23 January 1958 (age 68); Paris, France
- Occupation: Television host

Christophe Dechavanne (French: [dəʃavan]; born 23 January 1958) is a French television and radio host and program producer. He is the host of La Roue de la fortune.

== Biography ==
Dechavanne attended the Cours Hattemer, a private school. He started working as a radio host in the early 1980s. In 1985, he presented the daily talk-show C'est encore mieux l'après-midi on the state-owned television channel Antenne 2. In 1987, he went to work for the newly privatized channel TF1 : his first show, Panique sur le 16, was not a success, but he soon found his niche with the late-night weekly talk-show Ciel mon mardi !, a program which could be compared to Jerry Springer productions in United States. Dechavanne's energetic public persona and the frequent heated arguments between his guests proved popular among audiences, despite attracting criticism from several French media outlets. Dechavanne became his own producer in 1989, by creating the company Coyote productions.

From 1992 to 1994, Dechavanne presented the popular daily talk-show Coucou c'est nous !. However, he was less successful with the prime-time show Tout le toutim, which was stopped after four weeks for lack of sufficient audience shares. In 1997, he went back to state-owned television channels and presented Télé Qua Non and Du fer dans les épinards on France 2. He was then absent from television for several years and concentrated on his radio work for RTL and Europe 1.

In 2003, he took part on TF1 to Nice People, a French equivalent of sorts to Celebrity Big Brother, where common people and celebrities were locked in a house. He was then the host of La Ferme Célébrités in 2004 and 2005. Currently, Dechavanne hosts the French version of Wheel of Fortune, entitled La Roue de la fortune and presents special shows on a regular basis.

He is in relationship with Elena Foïs, twenty-two years younger than him, sister of french actress Marina Foïs.
