= Ida Ledermann =

Art historian and Holocaust survivor (1893-1967)

Ida Alice Dora Ledermann (born 23 November 1893 in Herdain; died 1967 in Freiburg im Breisgau) was a German-Jewish art historian and Holocaust survivor.

== Career ==
The daughter of the factory owner Bernhard Ledermann and his wife Frieda Ledermann (née Hirschel), Ida Ledermann studied art history in Berlin and earned her doctorate in 1920 under Adolph Goldschmidt, a leading medievalist in German art history. In October 1923 she began working as an unpaid volunteer at the Provinzialmuseum Hannover (now the Lower Saxony State Museum) working primarily on Dutch paintings, an area in which she possessed recognised expertise.

On 26 November 1924, Ida Ledermann took up a new post at the Kestner-Museum, then directed by Carl Küthmann, as a research assistant. After her contract ended in 1925, Ledermann moved to Freiburg im Breisgau.

Between 1923 and 1929 she published in various specialist journals and newspapers. While still in Hanover, she published an article in Die Graphischen Künste—a journal focused on graphic techniques, individual artists, collections and exhibition reports—on the woodcut artist Karl Friedrich Zähringer (1886–1923), who was later denounced by the National Socialists and included in the Entartete Kunst campaign.

In October 1940, as part of the so-called Wagner–Bürckel Action, Ida Ledermann was deported from Freiburg to the Gurs internment camp in the French Pyrenees because she was Jewish. She survived deportation and the war.

=== Later years ===
By 1954, Ida Ledermann had returned to Freiburg, where she lived until her death in 1967. In the 1950s, she also pursued a civil restitution case seeking the return of assets confiscated during the Holocaust, including bank accounts, household goods, works of art, a library, as well as jewellery and precious metals taken from her apartments in Freiburg and Badenweiler and from her mother’s residence in Berlin.

Her name appears for the last time in the Freiburg address directory of 1967, making it likely that she died in that year or shortly thereafter.

== Legacy ==
Ida Ledermann has largely fallen into obscurity today. Nonetheless, her professional work at the Kestner-Museum and the Provincial Museum in Hanover, as well as her publications, attest to her contributions to art history, particularly in the fields of Dutch painting and graphic art. Her fate as a survivor of the Holocaust and her postwar struggles for restitution stand as important testimony to the persecution and dispossession of Jewish intellectuals under National Socialism.

== Writings ==
- Beiträge zur Geschichte des romanistischen Landschaftsbildes in Holland und seines Einflusses auf die nationale Schule um die Mitte des 17. Jahrhunderts (Berlin / Kaiser Friedrich Universität, Dissertation). Berlin 1920
- Karl Friedrich Zähringer. In: Die graphischen Künste 46 (1923), S. 58–64
- Roman eines Malers. Gauguins Weg von Paris nach den Tropen. In: Gießener Anzeiger 19.10.1928, Nr. 247, Zweites Blatt, S. 5
- Rez.: Poeschel, Erwin: Das Burgenbuch von Graubünden (Zürich 1929). In: Oberrheinische Kunst 4 (1929/30), S. 45–47
- Poeschels Burgenbuch von Graubünden. In: Davoser Revue 5 (1930), S. 148–154

== See also ==
The Holocaust in France
