= La Roue de la fortune =

- Genre: Game show
- Based on: Wheel of Fortune by Merv Griffin
- Presented by: Michel Robbe; Christian Morin; Alexandre Debanne; Olivier Chiabodo; Christophe Dechavanne; Benjamin Castaldi; Éric Antoine
- Starring: Annie Pujol; Sandra Rossi; Frédérique Calvez; Victoria Silvstedt; Valérie Bègue
- Country of origin: France
- Original language: French
- No. of episodes: 695

Production
- Running time: 30 minutes
- Production companies: Endemol France; Hubert Productions (2006-2009); Case Productions (2006-2010); Endemol Jeux (2009-2010); Endemol Productions (2011-2012); Satisfy (2025-present); Paramount Global Content Distribution; Sony Pictures Television; Satisfaction Group

Original release
- Network: TF1
- Release: 5 January 1987 – April 1997
- Release: 7 August 2006 – 23 March 2012
- Network: M6
- Release: 27 January 2025 – present

La Roue de la fortune (The Wheel of Fortune) is the French version of the American game show Wheel of Fortune.

It was originally hosted by Michel Robbe, with other hosts being Christophe Dechavanne and Victoria Silvstedt and then by Benjamin Castaldi and 2008's Miss France, Valérie Bègue in early 2012.

Silvstedt was also a co-host for the Italian version called La ruota della fortuna (The Wheel of Fortune) that aired on Italia 1 hosted by Enrico Papi from 2007 until 2009.

The show aired on French television network TF1. The first episode aired on 5 January 1987, running until 1997. The modern incarnation of the show began in 2006, and ended in March 2012.

The show is returned in France on M6 from January 27, 2025.

After being off the air for 13 years, on 11 October 2024. It was announced that the show will be revived on rival channel M6 with comedic magician, theatre director, actor and presenter Éric Antoine as its new host in early 2025. Produced by Arthur via his production company Satisfy, the series premiered on January 27, 2025.

== History ==
When the show was originally produced in France, an attempt was made to copy the American version of the show exactly, even to the point where host Michel Robbe copied the mannerisms of the American host. Producer Marc Gurnaud said that in order to retain its American aspects, the show had to move along quickly with no pauses or attempts at conversation between the hosts.

By May 1987, the show had a viewership of approximately 10 million.

== Hosts ==
- Michel Robbe (1987)
- Christian Morin (September 1987-December 1992)
- Alexandre Debanne (January 1993-December 1994)
- Olivier Chiabodo (January 1995-April 1997)
- Christophe Dechavanne (7 August 2006 - 1 January 2012)
- Benjamin Castaldi (2 January 2012 - 23 March 2012)
- Eric Antoine (since 27 January 2025)

== Hostesses ==
- Annie Pujol (1987 - December 1994)
- Sandra Rossi (January 1995)
- Frederique Calvez (February 1995 - April 1997)
- Victoria Silvstedt (7 August 2006 – 1 January 2012)
- Valérie Bègue (2 January 2012 - 23 March 2012)

NOTE: Like in the British, South Africa & Australia versions in 2024, the 2025 version did not have the use of a female co-host of any kind.

== Gameplay ==
The wheel had 24 spaces. These represented cash values, penalty spaces, and strategic elements for use in the game. A player who did not land on a penalty space asked for a consonant. If it was not in the puzzle, play proceeded to the next player. If the letter appeared in the puzzle, the hostess revealed all instances of it, and the player was credited with cash. All descriptions of players being credited in the remainder of this article assume that the player called a consonant which appeared in the puzzle.

From 1987 to 1997, the wheel's colour scheme was similar to the US version's round 1 wheel used from 1986-1996.

Unlike the American version of the game, only the winner of the main game gets to keep all of the prizes and money won; the others had to forfeit their winnings.

== Game notes ==
=== The Wheel ===
When the franc was in use, the minimum cash value on the wheel was 500₣ and the top values went as high as 10,000₣. Since adopting the euro, values ranged from €0 - €500 with top values of €1,000, €1,500, and €2,000. Since 2012, the values are ranged from €0 - €300. The €0 space meant a contestant had to guess a letter correctly to continue but won nothing.

=== French Terms for Special Wheel Wedges ===
- Relance/Joker: Free Spin (used only in the original versions).
- Passe: Lose a Turn.
- Banqueroute: Bankrupt. Note that the Bankrupt/€10,000/Bankrupt wedge was only used in the 2006 version in Round 4. In January 2012, this was replaced by a €60,000 wedge which worked the same way as the Million Dollar Wedge in the current US version.
- Jackpot: The Jackpot was administered differently from the US version. The value was €0 at the beginning of the game and increased with every spin of the wheel but did not become available until round three. Starting with the third round, the Jackpot wedge was added and administered like a regular prize wedge in that a player must land on the wedge and call a letter in the puzzle to acquire the special wedge. The player must not hit Banqueroute for the remainder of the round and solve the puzzle to win the Jackpot.
- Mystfre: Mystery. Used in Round 2 from October 26 to December 18, 2009 and in Round 1 in the 2012 version, these wedges offered €300 (€50 in 2012) per letter or a chance to flip it. It could be €2,500 (€500 in 2012) or Banqueroute.
- Vendredi 13: Used only when the 13th day of a calendar month falls on a Friday. Should the contestant stop on this wedge, it could either be big money or Banqueroute.

Having first appeared on the French version on 31 August 2009, the Jackpot wedge was similar to the US Jackpot wedge used in Season 26. The wedge had a 3D design which made it stand out above the rest of the wheel.

=== Unique to European Versions (not used in the US version) ===
Two different wedges

Hold up: Used in Round 4, anyone who landed on this wedge and correctly guessed a letter could steal the earnings of the leading opponent in that round, just like the "Power" wedge from the Philippine ABS-CBN version of Wheel of Fortune. In the Dutch version, this is called "Overhaul."

Caverne: Used in Round 2, a player who landed on this wedge would have the opportunity to win small prizes, such as electronics, bicycles, etc. They had 15 seconds to select as many prizes from the Cave as possible. However, if the total value of the chosen prizes exceeded a set limit they lost all the prizes. In the original version, the limit was 15,000₣. It then became €2,500 in round two and €2,000 in round three. After the premiere of the Jackpot round on 31 August 2009, the value of the Caverne space was worth €2,000 in both rounds two and three. In the 2012 version, the time limit was 30 seconds with a €1,500 limit.

The Caverne space was similar to a blend of the classic shopping for prizes segment combined with the physical game action of the US children's version Wheel 2000.

Zero Euro Wedge: A player who landed on this wedge needed to correctly guess a letter on the board to remain in control of the wheel but collected nothing. Note the US version of Wheel of Fortune had a $0 wedge, but this existed only during the first pilot in 1973 (named "Shopper's Bazaar").

Flash Cash: This existed in Round 3 only in the 2012 version. If a player landed on this, he or she had 10 seconds to solve the puzzle for a bonus up to €1,000, decreasing by €100 for each second spent trying to guess the puzzle. It is likely unknown whether or not the turn was lost if the 10 seconds ran out.

=== Buying a vowel ===
Vowels cost 2,000₣ (1,000₣ by 1994), but were later worth €200 beginning in 2006 and €100 in 2012. Like the US version, if a player had enough money to buy a vowel, they could do so at a flat rate, and not at a multiplied rate like consonants. Unlike the US version, the fee is not levied if the called vowel is not in the puzzle.

=== Shopping ===
The original French version used the pre-1987 US version element of shopping, which worked exactly the same way. However, the more recent incarnations offered for cash (as has been the case since 1987 in the US version).

=== Toss-Up Puzzles ===
A major difference with the US version was the toss-up puzzle. In this version, every round started with such a puzzle (in the US version, they are played before contestant interviews, and before the first and fourth rounds). However, like the US version, there was a toss-up before the contestant interviews to determine who would be introduced first.

Furthermore, they were worth €500 and the right to start the round with the €500 that could be lost if a player spins Bankrupt. The regular puzzle must be solved to keep the money. (The 2007-09 Italian version of the show would repeat this concept.)

=== Bonus Round ===
The more recent versions used the US version's 2001 rules with a 24-space Bonus Wheel, with the top winner of the day spinning it. In 2006, the prizes could be cash amounts from €5,000, €7,500, €10,000, €15,000, €20,000, and €25,000, two cars, or the top prize of €100,000. In the daily version from 2012, the envelopes contained one car, €2,000, €2,500, €3,000, €4,000, €5,000, €10,000, and the top prize was €30,000 unless the €60,000 wedge was brought into the bonus round.

The contestant was then shown a puzzle and then all of the instances of R, S, T, L, N and E which appeared in that puzzle. The contestant then chose three more consonants and an additional vowel. After all the letters were chosen, they were revealed if they appear in the puzzle. The player then had 10 seconds to solve the puzzle. As is the case in the US version, the player's prize they were playing for was not revealed until after the round ends.

In the original run, the player chose five consonants and a vowel. From 1994 until 1997, the winning player touched one of 24 panels at his or her podium, each of which concealed two different consonants which would light up when touched, and the player called three more consonants and then a vowel.

== Studio ==
The 2006 French studio was somewhat identical to the US version, with the French puzzle board exactly like the US one. The only major difference was that the studio audience was directly behind the contestants, unlike the US version, where the video wall stands behind the contestants. There was also a light display around the puzzle board that alternates between red, yellow, and blue, to indicate what player's turn it was. The board used from 1995 to 1997 also had this feature.

Other countries that had their sets similar, although not exactly the same, to the French version include Italy (La ruota della fortuna) until 2009, Turkey (Çarkıfelek) until about 2010, Poland (Koło Fortuny) until 2009, and Portugal (A Roda da Sorte) until 2009. Of these four specific versions, only Turkey's version is still on the air. (Poland would eventually get a new version in 2017; like the 2009 set, this one has the audience directly behind the contestants.)

== Categories ==
The French version of Wheel of Fortune had categories that are slightly variated from the U.S. version.

- CHOSE, MACHIN, TRUC - THING. The name of the category comes from the different ways to say "thing" in French.
  - EN VOITURE - THING related to an automobile.
  - BRICOLAGE ET JARDINAGE - THING related with DIY and gardening.
- EXPRESSION FAMILIÈRE - Roughly equivalent to PHRASE.
- PERSONNAGE - FICTIONAL CHARACTER.
- ENIGME À DOUBLE SENS - A hybrid category of FILL IN THE BLANK and BEFORE & AFTER. The puzzle consists of two words or expressions linked together by a common word, of which the solving player can win €500 for correctly identifying.
- 7ME ART - SHOW BIZ. The category comes from the French expression for film and cinema.
- LOISIRS & JEUX - FUN & GAMES. A related "subcategory" also exists.
  - SPORT - FUN & GAMES related to sports.
- VIE QUOTIDIENNE - Deals with activities in one's daily life. Roughly similar to WHAT ARE YOU DOING? or EVENT.
  - EN HIVER - Like EVENT, but deals with activities exclusively done in the winter. Usually it is only used during the winter episodes.
- LIEU OU MONUMENT - PLACE or LANDMARK in the U.S. version.
  - SUR LA PLANÈTE - ON THE MAP, however it is often interchanged with LIEU OU MONUMENT.
- ARTS

== Official Website ==
TF1 version
M6 version
