= La Zoubida =

1991 single by Lagaf'

Single by Lagaf'

from the album Le Lavabo
- Released: 13 May 1991
- Length: 3:55
- Label: Flarenasch
- Songwriter(s): Lagaf'
- Producer(s): Dimitri Yerasimos

Lagaf' singles chronology
"Bo le lavabo (WC Kiss)" (1990)	"La Zoubida" (1991)	"Je veux des vacances" (1993)

"La Zoubida" (pronounced [la zubida]) is a novelty song by French TV presenter and humorist Lagaf'. In May 1991, it was released as the second single from his album Le Lavabo. It became a hit in mid-1991, staying at the top of the French Singles Chart for 11 weeks. The song formed the basis for a side-scrolling platform game, Lagaf': Les Aventures de Moktar — Vol 1: La Zoubida, developed by Titus Interactive; the game would later be altered and released as Titus the Fox internationally.

== Lyrics and music ==
In a humorous style, "La Zoubida" tells the story of a young North African girl called Zoubida, who lives in Barbès, whose parents have forbidden her to go dancing. The girl is saved by her friend Moktar, but, as he is a robber of "golden" scooters, the two end the night at the police station. These dubious clichés have earned the song some criticism. As for the music, the melody is repetitive and every sentence is echoed in the vocals. The music is taken from the traditional French song "Sur le pont du Nord", the lyrics and the overall structure being a parody of this folk song.

The song was parodied by Les Inconnus. In the video, Didier Bourdon performs the song in the bed of Lullaby clip, on the music of "Close to Me" by the Cure.

== Chart performance ==
The single debuted at number 24 on 1 June 1991 on the French Top 50 Singles Chart. It climbed quickly and eventually reached number one on 20 July. It remained for eleven non consecutive weeks at the top of the chart, blocking Paul Young and Zucchero's hit "Senza una donna" at number two for six weeks. It remained in the top ten for a total of 24 weeks and fell off the top 50 on 25 January 1992, after 34 weeks, which was the longest chart trajectory for a single in 1991. The single was certified Platinum disc by the Syndicat National de l'Édition Phonographique for over 500,000 units sold.

== Track listings ==
- CD single
1. "La Zoubida" – 3:55
2. "La Zoubida" (Aziz house version) – 8:02
- 12-inch maxi
1. "La Zoubida" – 3:55
2. "La Zoubida" (instrumental) – 3:55
3. "La Zoubida" (Aziz house version) – 8:02
- 7-inch single
1. "La Zoubida" – 3:55
2. "La Zoubida" (instrumental) – 3:55

== Charts ==
=== Weekly charts ===
Chart (1991)	Peak position
Belgium (Ultratop 50 Wallonia)	10
Europe (European Hot 100)	11
France (SNEP)	1

=== Year-end charts ===
Chart (1991)	Position
Europe (European Hot 100)	25

== Certifications ==
Certifications for "La Zoubida"
Region	Certification	Certified units/sales
France (SNEP)	Platinum	500,000^{*}
^{*} Sales figures based on certification alone.

== See also ==
- List of number-one singles of 1991 (France)
