= Vincent Lagaf' =

French humorist and television presenter (born 1959)

- Born: Vincent Rouïl; 30 October 1959 (age 66); Mont-Saint-Aignan, Seine-Maritime, France
- Occupations: Comedian; Actor; Singer; Game show host
- Years active: 1987–present

Vincent Rouïl (French pronunciation: [vɛ̃sɑ̃ ʁuj]; born 30 October 1959), better known as Vincent Lagaf' (pronounced [laɡaf]), is a French humorist, TV presenter, singer and actor.

== Biography ==
In 1987, Vincent Lagaf', who had just arrived in Paris, came to national attention as a comedian when he appeared on the TV show (La Classe) aimed at discovering young comedians. With his first one-man show, Lagaf' became popular thanks to the song "Bo le lavabo", which was a success in France in 1990. A year later, he had a similar success with "La Zoubida" which was in the list of the 100 best-selling singles in France during the 1990s. (A side-scrolling platform game developed by Titus Interactive based on this song was also produced, later altered and released as Titus the Fox in other markets.) Until 1995, working with the producer Hervé Hubert, he continued to act in many sketches on stage or for television and to interpret new funny songs like Casse toi and Sweet Georgia Brown. In 1995, he played the part of Scipion in the play Le Surbook.

In 1996, for French TV channel TF1, he began hosting game shows. In 1998, he adapted Let's Make a Deal for the French audience. He hosted Le Bigdil for six years with a virtual alien called Bill and his beautiful dancing girls Les Gafettes. With this show, he became one of the most popular TV presenters, twice an award winner, and a successful TV producer. In 2000, Lagaf' and Hubert sold their companies to Endemol.

In 2006, Lagaf' stopped hosting and producing TV shows to take a sabbatical year. In 2008, he played the first leading role in the movie Le Baltringue. In 2009, after a tour with a new play Pourquoi Moi?!, he returned TV with a new version of The Price Is Right (Le Juste Prix), produced by Hubert who now works with Fremantle Media.

In 2011, he hosted the French version of the English gameshow Ant & Dec's Push the Button.

In 2016, Lagaf quit TF1.

== Television ==
- Yakapa (January 1992 – March 1994)
- L'Or à l'appel (March 1996 – June 1997)
- Drôle de jeu (January 1997 – June 1999)
- Le Bigdil (2 February 1998 – 23 July 2004, 2025-present)
- Crésus (4 July 2005 – 1 September 2006)
- Le Juste Prix (July 2009 – 2015)
- Strike! (2016–present)

== Discography ==
=== Albums ===
- Le Lavabo (1990)
- Lagaf' en chansons (1994)

=== Singles ===
- "Bo le lavabo (WC Kiss)" (1990) – FRA #1 (see List of French number-one hits of 1990)
- "La Zoubida" (1991) – FRA #1 (see List of French number-one hits of 1991)
- "Je veux des vacances" (1993) – FRA #17

== Bibliography ==
- Éclats de rire, No. 3537 (1993), J'ai lu Ed. (ISBN 9782277235378)
- Rires à la pelle (1996), Michel Lafon Ed. (ISBN 9782840982357)
- Drôle de jeu (1999), Michel Lafon Ed. (ISBN 978-2-84098-529-7)

== Filmography ==
- 1994 : Histoire de fou (short movie) by Eric Cayron – leading role
- 2005 : Sous le soleil – guest star
- 2002 : Les Razmoket rencontrent les Delajungle by John Eng – dog's voice
- 2010 : Le Baltringue by Cyril Sebas – leading role

== Awards ==
- 7 d'or for "Personality of the year" (1999)
- 7 d'or for "Best game show" for Le Bigdil (2000)
