= Jean-Luc Reichmann =

French radio and television host (born 1960)

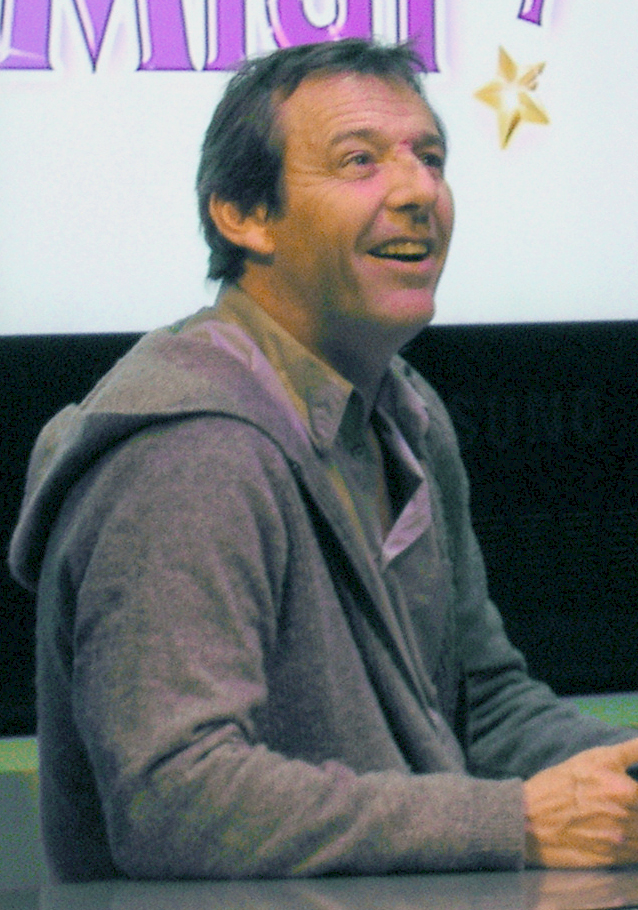
- Reichmann in 2012
- Born: 2 November 1960 (age 65); Fontainebleau, France
- Occupation: Television presenter

Jean-Luc Stéphane Reichmann (born 2 November 1960) is a French radio and television host. He started a career on radio in 1981, then became a TV presenter in 1995, and tried a career as an actor from 2008. He is now particularly known for his daily show Les douze coups de midi, broadcast at 12:00 pm on TF1. He has six children.

== Voice-over ==
- 1989–1999: Les Guignols de l'info, Canal+
- 1991–1994: Que le meilleur gagne and N'oubliez pas votre brosse à dents, France 2
- The Price Is Right, TF1
- Porco Rosso (animated feature): Curtis
- Tribunal (series)
- Motus, France 2
- Ma voyante préférée (series)

== TV shows ==
- Le Trophée Campus, France 2
- 1995–2000: Les Z'amours, France 2
- 1998: Jeux sans frontières, France 2
- 1999: Les Forges du désert, France 2
- (10 March 2001)-(27 June 2010): Attention à la marche !, TF1
- 2007: Phénoménal, TF1
- 2009: Identity, TF1
- Since June 2010: Les Douze Coups de midi, TF1
- 2014: Au pied du mur!, TF1

== TV films ==
- 2008: Le monde est petit, TF1
- 2010: Joséphine, ange gardien TV Series (1 Episode: "Ennemis jurés")
- 2011: Victor Sauvage, TF1
