= Philippe Risoli =

French television host (born 1953)

- Born: 9 September 1953 (age 73); Paris, France
- Occupation: TV host

Philippe Risoli (born 9 September 1953 in Paris) is a French television host with Italian origins. He is also an unsuccessful singer.

== Career ==
He presented the trivia game Quiz Star, from 10 February 1986 to 6 September 1987 on Canal +, prior to succeed Philippe Gildas to present the show Direct. He presented La Nouvelle Affiche in 1987 on France 3.

Then he moved to TF1 where he hosted TV game including Jeopardy! and The Price Is Right (from 10 November 1992, succeeding Patrick Roy-31 August 2001, deletion of the game of TF1's antenna) and variety shows such as Succès fous with Patrick Roy and Christian Morin. He also hosted Viva la vie on TF1 in 1988, Capitale d'un soir from 1997 to 1998 with Nathalie Simon, and later with Sophie Favier.

When The Price is right was deleted, he began a singing career after presenting Les Copains d'Accords on RFM TV, a musical program, and released his first album entitled Autrement. One single was released : "Cuitas les bananas", which was not well received by the press and critics. In 2005, he participated in the reality show La Ferme Célébrités. In 2008, he participated in an ad for France Abonnements. Despite the failure of his first album, he tried again to record a second album in December 2008 entitled Semblant de croire featuring 11 tracks can be purchased only on a legal platform on the Internet.

Since September 2009, he hosted L'École des fans on Gulli.
