= Patrick Bruel sexual assault cases =

Cases surrounding sexual assault allegations against French singer Patrick Bruel

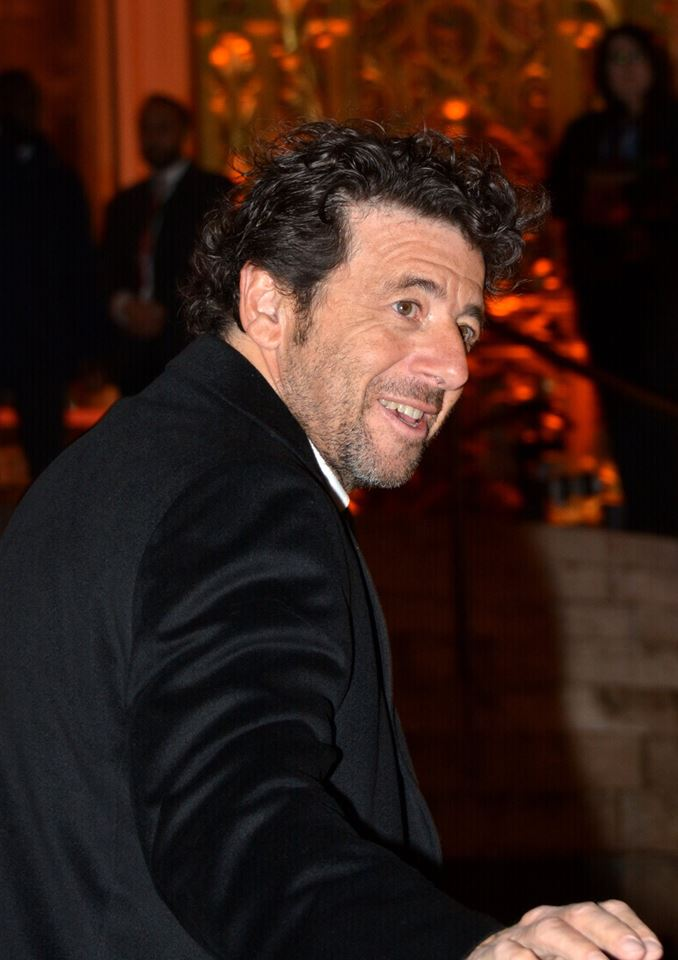
Patrick Bruel in 2018

The Patrick Bruel sexual assault cases (French: Affaire Patrick Bruel) are a series of legal investigations into French singer-songwriter and actor Patrick Bruel, who has been accused by around 30 women of rape, attempted rape, sexual assault, and sexual harassment.

On 19 March 2026, French independent online newspaper Mediapart published an investigation in which eight women accused Patrick Bruel of sexual violence between 1992 and 2019. Among them are two public figures: Daniela Elstner, chief executive of Unifrance, who filed a complaint alleging attempted rape and sexual assault by Bruel, and French presenter Flavie Flament, who initially came forward anonymously and later publicly, filing a complaint alleging rape in 1991 whilst she was a minor. Following Mediapart's revelations, other complainants have come forward in France, Belgium and Quebec, Canada.

This has led the public prosecutor’s office in Nanterre, which handles the majority of such cases, to reopen the case involving Ophélie Fajfer, who accused the actor of rape in 2015 and whose complaint was dismissed in 2022.

In July 2026, at least 31 complaints had been filed against Bruel, including 12 alleging rape. The alleged incidents took place between 1991 and 2019.

Patrick Bruel denies all the allegations and remains presumed innocent under French law. On 10 June 2026, he was placed under formal investigation for rape, attempted rape, sexual assault and sexual harassment.

== Allegations ==
=== Case dismissed in 2019 ===
In 2019, a 21-year-old massage therapist accused Patrick Bruel of "inappropriate behaviour", although she did not press charges. The incident is said to have taken place on 9 August 2019 at the Radisson Blu hotel in Grosseto-Prugna, Corsica, whilst friends of Bruel had booked a massage at the hotel where she worked. A preliminary investigation was launched into indecent exposure and sexual harassment.

In late September 2019, two further massage therapists reported Bruel's behaviour to the public prosecutor's office in Ajaccio, in relation to incidents dating back to September 2008 in Cannes and 2011 in Saint-Barthélemy. The second victim lodged a complaint with the public prosecutor's office in Ajaccio. Also in September 2019, another masseuse spoke to French newspaper Le Progrès and gave an account of Patrick Bruel's inappropriate behaviour.

In October 2019, a massage therapist at a spa in Perpignan filed a complaint against Bruel for sexual assault. The public prosecutor's office launched an investigation. Anne, a singer, filed a complaint concerning an alleged rape in 2010, after reading the witness accounts in the 2019 reports.

In December 2020, the public prosecutor’s office in Nanterre decided not to pursue the three preliminary investigations, as well as a referral from the Swiss authorities to the French judicial authorities. (Note: In July 2019, a massage therapist alleged that Patrick Bruel had engaged in "unacceptable behaviour" at the Paléo Festival in Nyon, Switzerland. The legal proceedings concluded in 2022 with "a settlement between the parties including a confidentiality clause". Patrick Bruel's lawyer confirmed that Bruel had donated several thousand euros to a charity supporting immigrant women. The festival ceased its collaboration with Bruel.) During the proceedings, nine statements were taken in relation to events dating back to 2008.

=== Complaints and testimonials in 2026 ===
Mediapart journalist Marine Turchi had been conducting an investigation for seven years, the results of which were published on 19 March 2026. The information was made public and prompted further testimonies.

Eight women have accused Patrick Bruel of sexual violence between 1992 and 2019. Daniela Elstner, chief executive of Unifrance, filed a complaint against Bruel on 13 March 2026 for attempted rape and sexual assault during the French Film Festival in Acapulco, Mexico in November 1997. A complaint was lodged against Patrick Bruel in 2024 in Saint-Malo for rape in 2012, during the Festival du film britannique de Dinard, where he was chairing the jury.

Around thirty women have come forward in France, Belgium, and Quebec, Canada. French singer and actress Maïdi Roth accuses Bruel of sexual assault, also at the Acapulco Film Festival in 1997. In Belgium, Karine Viseur lodged another complaint against Patrick Bruel, whom she accused of sexual assault on the premises of the RTBF in 2010, whilst she was a press officer (she had previously withdrawn the complaint she had lodged at the time). Marie, another press officer, spoke out about an attempted sexual assault in 2004. Both of these Belgian women believe that Patrick Bruel's behaviour was well known within the arts community. Florina Treiber, Miss Alsace 2007, claims to have been sexually assaulted by Patrick Bruel in 2008.

In Quebec, Canada, a Québécoise journalist reported the incident to the police in 2017 following a sexual assault by Patrick Bruel. In Monaco, a journalist accused the actor of attempted rape in 2000.

On 13 April 2026, Elle magazine quoted four other women who claimed to have been victims of sexual violence at the hands of Bruel. The complaint of rape and sexual assault filed by one of them, Ophélie Fajfer, was dismissed in 2022. A journalist lodged a complaint with the public prosecutor's office in Paris alleging attempted rape in connection with incidents that took place in 2000. Irène, a former employee of BMG, filed a complaint on 18 May 2026 alleging sexual assault and attempted rape in relation to incidents that took place in 2002 and 2003.

On 7 May 2026, another article by Marine Turchi in Mediapart revealed the existence of fifteen allegations against Patrick Bruel relating to alleged sexual assault, some of which are said to have been committed whilst the victims were under the influence of date rape drugs, between 1991 and 2019; one of the victims is reported to have been a minor.

On 12 May 2026, two women refiled complaints at the Nanterre court, bringing civil proceedings for sexual assault. Their complaints had been dismissed in 2020: Julia, a massage therapist in Perpignan in 2019, and Anne, a singer, in relation to incidents dating back to 2010.

On 15 May 2026, French presenter Flavie Flament, who had given evidence under a pseudonym in Mediapart, announced that she was filing a complaint alleging rape by chemical subjugation in 1991, whilst she was a minor. Her lawyer Corinne Herrmann, who is also representing a complainant in the Patrick Poivre d’Arvor case, intends to have the limitation period set aside by invoking the case law set in the trial of Dino Scala, a serial rapist. This precedent establishes the concept of a "sliding limitation period": where a person rapes a minor again after the limitation period for the first rape has expired, the new rape resets the limitation period for the first offence. Similarly, the connection between the cases triggers a "cascading limitation period". Corinne Herrmann stated: "In our view, the limitation period has not yet expired, given the list of alleged offences. We will have to wait for the outcome of the preliminary investigation to know for certain".

Patrick Bruel denies all the allegations, refuting any claims of "violence, coercion or threats".

In May 2026, the Paris Public Prosecutor consolidated most of the proceedings at the public prosecutor's office in Nanterre, which had "jurisdiction by virtue of Patrick Bruel’s place of residence". The case involving Ophélie Fajfer, who had accused the actor of rape in 2015 and whose complaint had been dismissed in 2022, was reopened.

On 23 May 2026, the newspapers Le Monde, Ouest-France and RTL identified at least thirteen complaints, twelve of which were made in France, relating to sexual assaults and attempted rapes, five of which were for rape, which took place between 1991 and 2015.

On 27 May 2026 and 3 June 2026, two new complaints of rape, dating from 2000 and 2008, were lodged with the Nanterre court by a physiotherapist who had previously given evidence in the case involving the masseuses and Florina Treiber, the former Miss Alsace. On 8 June 2026, a comedian accused Bruel of attempted rape at his home in Paris in 2000.

=== Formal investigation ===
On 8 June 2026, Patrick Bruel was taken into police custody by the Regional Directorate of the Judicial Police of the Paris Police Prefecture to be questioned in connection with 13 complaints. His custody was extended by the following day. On 10 June 2026, he was brought before four investigating judges, and a request was made for him to be remanded in pre-trial detention. The public prosecutor requested that a judicial investigation be opened against him and that he be placed under formal investigation for rape, attempted rape, sexual assault and sexual harassment involving nine victims, committed between 2010 and 2019. He was placed under judicial supervision and formally investigated in four cases, while being designated as an assisted witness in four others. He is no longer permitted to visit massage parlours or make contact with the victims; he must not leave the country and must post bail of €500,000. He must provide evidence that he is receiving psychological treatment. However, he may continue his artistic activities in public.

=== Complaints and testimonies following the indictment ===
On 12 June 2026, two further complaints were lodged with the Nanterre court: one by Amandine, a psychotherapist, alleging attempted rape and sexual assault in 2007, and a second complaint alleging rape and sexual assault in 2012.

On 25 June 2026 and 1 July 2026, three further complaints were lodged with the Nanterre court and the Paris Judicial Police: two counts of rape in 2000 and 2014, and the sexual assault of a minor in 1992.

On 10 July 2026, the Agence France-Presse reported that a new complaint of rape had been lodged on 24 June 2026 at the Nanterre court by a 16-year-old model, Pauline, relating to incidents in the 2000s.

On 16 July 2026 and 23 July 2026, two complaints were lodged with the Paris Judicial Police: a sexual assault in Greece in 2005 and a rape in 1994.

On 28 July 2026, BFM TV reported that at least 31 complaints had been logged.

On 21 July 2026, the investigating judge in Nanterre lifted the ban on leaving the country at the request of Bruel's lawyers. The news was revealed on 14 August 2026 following an investigation by Mediapart. The public prosecutor's office appealed against this decision. The Appeal Investigating Chamber of the Versailles Court of Appeal upheld this relaxation of the restrictions on 16 September 2026.

On 2 September 2026, RTL and Paris Match published the testimony of French singer and actress Helena Noguerra without her consent. To support the testimonies of the massage therapists in 2019, she wrote a letter in 2022 to the public prosecutor's office in Corsica in which she accused Patrick Bruel of sexual assault in 2000. She did not press charges and wished for her testimony to remain anonymous. She was interviewed in June 2026. Helena Noguerra was one of the eight testimonies published as part of Mediapart's first investigation in March 2026.

== Omertà of the industry ==
As the number of complaints and testimonies has grown and the scandal has gained momentum, people have begun to speak out, referring to an "omertà" (culture of silence) and suggesting that Bruel's toxic and domineering behaviour had been known to a large part of the industry for years. Numerous accounts refer to an unspoken rule to "never leave a woman alone with him".

== Reactions and consequences ==
=== Feminist organizations ===
Following these revelations, feminist organizations and activists have launched campaigns. The "Salon féministe" collective has launched a petition to cancel Bruel's tour, scheduled for June to December 2026, calling for "the celebration of an alleged abuser to be cancelled and for support to be given to the women who have had the courage to speak out". The petition gathered 48,000 signatures and was backed by French actresses Anna Mouglalis, Corinne Masiero and Anouk Grinberg.

=== Political sphere ===
In France, some mayors such as Emmanuel Grégoire in Paris, Mathieu Klein in Nancy, Régis Juanico in Saint-Étienne, Grégory Doucet in Lyon, Benoît Payan in Marseille and Emmanuel Denis in Tours, are calling on Bruel to cancel his planned visit to those towns.

Mathilde Panot, the president of La France insoumise in the National Assembly, called on the organizers of Patrick Bruel's concerts to cancel them, arguing that there is "a risk to the female workers on this tour, but also to the fans attending the concerts". French economist and politician Sandrine Rousseau echoes these arguments.

Aurore Bergé, the minister for Gender Equality, Diversity and Equal Opportunities, states that "it is up to him [Patrick Bruel] to decide whether he wishes to continue performing on stage"; she understands "the concern of those who consider this to be inappropriate, who do not wish to attend"; in her view, it is a matter of "individual freedom to attend or not"; she adds: "if I were to formally call on Patrick Bruel to cancel these concerts, you can imagine how that would be interpreted: there would no longer be a presumption of innocence".

In Belgium, the mayor of Liège, Willy Demeyer, suspended Bruel's honorary citizenship in May 2026 pending the outcome of the proceedings.

=== Entertainment and media ===
==== Concerts ====
Patrick Bruel's tour scheduled for Canada in December 2026, comprising three concerts in Quebec and three in Montreal, was cancelled, as the organizer considered it impossible to promote the tour properly. Similarly, the Bellarena Indoor Festival in Fribourg, Switzerland, postponed the concert scheduled for 26 June 2026. (Note: The organizers state: "The situation will be reassessed in due course with a view to the 2027 edition of the festival".) For its part, the Paléo Festival will no longer invite Patrick Bruel following a report by a volunteer masseuse at the festival detailing Bruel's behaviour towards her.

Patrick Bruel cancelled about fifteen concerts scheduled for June 2026 to September 2026, in agreement with the festival organizers. His production company, 14 Production, does not wish "under any circumstances to expose either the organizers or the public to a climate of tension".

On 1 September 2026, Patrick Bruel cancelled his fall tour Alors regarde 35, stating that:

The conditions are simply no longer in place for these concerts to remain what they should have been: moments of music and togetherness.

This cancellation followed, in particular, the refusal of several mayors to host him.

==== Theatre ====
On 4 June 2026, the management of the Théâtre Édouard VII cancelled the final five performances of the play Deuxième partie, following protests by feminist groups.

==== Television and radio ====
On television, Nagui withdrew Patrick Bruel's songs from the program N'oubliez pas les paroles! on France 2, as did the radio stations RFM, RMC and Ici. (Note: "pending the courts’ examination of the facts")

At the end of May, Bruel withdrew from Les Enfoirés concerts broadcast on TF1, according to a message he sent to the troupe so as not, he said, to put them in an awkward position.

==== Label ====
In May 2026, Bruel's label Sony Music Entertainment suspended all promotional activities associated with Bruel.

=== Public ===
Patrick Bruel's fanbase is gradually splitting into two camps: on the one hand, the artist's staunch supporters, who invoke the presumption of innocence or claim it is all a conspiracy; and on the other, those who have expressed doubt, disappointment and rejection. Flavie Flament is being subjected to cyberbullying and misogynistic harassment by Bruel's fans on social media.

== See also ==
- Violence against women
- Feminism in France
- Child sexual abuse
