= Benjamin Castaldi =

French television and radio host

- Born: 28 March 1970 (age 56); Boulogne-Billancourt, France
- Other names: Benji; Casta
- Occupations: Television host, radio host, columnist
- Years active: 1994–present
- Spouses: Valérie Sapienza (m. 1997; div. 2001) Flavie Flament (m. 2002; div. 2008) Vanessa Broussouloux (m. 2011; div. 2016) Aurore Aleman (m. 2016)
- Children: 4
- Parent(s): Jean-Pierre Castaldi; Catherine Allégret
- Relatives: Simone Signoret (maternal grandmother); Yves Montand (maternal step-grandfather)

Benjamin Castaldi (French pronunciation: [bɛ̃ʒamɛ̃ kastaldi]; born 28 March 1970) is a French television host, columnist, radio host and producer. He is the former host of Secret Story, a spinoff of Loft Story, which he also hosted.

== Biography ==
=== Family ===
Benjamin Castaldi was born into a family of artists, being the son of actress and writer Catherine Allégret and actor Jean-Pierre Castaldi. He grew up surrounded by his grandmother, actress Simone Signoret, his grandfather, director Yves Allégret, and the adoptive father of his mother, actor and singer Yves Montand. He has a maternal half-sister, Clémentine Vaudaux and two paternal half-siblings, Giovanni and Paola. He is of Italian, Polish-Jewish, and Hungarian-Jewish descent.

=== Studies and professional debut ===
In the late 1980s, Castaldi, who then aspired to become a businessman, began studies in economics at Sorbonne University. He then applied for a position in a home meal delivery company, where he was finally hired as a salesperson. Castaldi then became director of the company, which ended up filing bankruptcy. Wishing to try his luck as a music producer, he moved to the United States where he tried to relaunch the career of singer Esther Galil. After this failed, in 1993, he returned to Paris. Meanwhile, in 1992, he participated as an "anonymous" candidate in the game Que le meilleur gagne presented by Nagui on La Cinq.

=== Personal life ===
Castaldi married on 22 September 1993 in Saint-Mandé to Valérie Sapienza, the mother of his sons Julien (born 18 September 1996) and Simon (born 20 April 2000). They divorced in 2001. On 21 September 2002, he married the television and radio host Flavie Flament whom he met in December 2000 on the show Les P'tits Princes (on TF1). Castaldi has a son with her, Enzo (born 8 February 2004). They separated in December 2006 before divorcing in July 2008. On 24 November 2011, he married journalist and television host Vanessa Broussouloux in Copenhagen, Denmark. They divorced in May 2016 and on 27 August of the same year he married an interview director of the company Endemol, Aurore Aleman, met in 2015.

His eldest son Julien joined The Mad Mag on NRJ12 as a columnist in 2017.

On 22 November 2017, he revealed on the plateau of Touche pas à mon poste ! having had a three-day affair with the French journalist Annie Lemoine.

=== Motorcycle accident ===
On 23 June 2012, Castaldi was involved in a motorcycle accident where he suffered a collarbone fracture and two broken ribs. He left the hospital the following day. At the time, he was hosting the French reality series Secret Story which led to the decision that television presenter Nikos Aliagas hosted the show while everybody waited for Castaldi's return. Castaldi returned on air on 2 July, but normality was soon interrupted. It turned out that he had six broken ribs, and his collarbone had not healed properly, he was operated with urgency. The Voice of Secret Story took over the hosting of the show.

=== Financial issues ===
In 2012, Castaldi discovered that he was ruined and claimed to be a victim of a real estate scam of the financial consulting company Apollonia. In 2017 he said he couldn't buy Christmas presents or do fun activities with his children anymore.

In December 2014, he publicly declared himself a victim of a scam that involved a notary, a promoter and a bank. He claimed €6 million in court for compensation of damages he suffered.

== Career ==
- 1994–1997: Studio Gabriel with Michel Drucker / France 2
- 1997–1998: L'Étoffe des ados / La Cinquième
- 1997–1998: Drucker'N Co / France 2
- 1998: Le rendez-vous / La Cinquième
- 1998: Fous d'humour / France 2
- 1998–1999: Vivement dimanche with Michel Drucker / France 2
- 1999: Célébrités / TF1 with Carole Rousseau and Stéphane Bern
- 2000: Les P'tits Princes / TF1 with Carole Rousseau, Sophie Thalmann, Billy, Frédéric Joly and Flavie Flament
- 2001–2002: Loft Story (seasons 1–2) / M6
- 2002: Popstars, spéciale L5 / M6
- 2002–2003: QI, Le Grand Test (editions 1 – 2) / M6 with Mac Lesggy
- 2002–2003: Absolument 80, Absolument 70, Absolument Été / M6
- 2002: Mémoire, Le Grand Test / M6 with Mac Lesggy
- 2003–2006: Nouvelle Star (seasons 1–4) / M6
- 2003: Tous les oppose / M6
- 2003: Culture générale, Le Grand Test / M6 : with Mac Lesggy
- 2004: Permis de conduire, Le Grand Test / M6 with Mac Lesggy
- 2004: Le Pensionnat de Chavagnes : Ils disent tout ! / M6 with Mac Lesggy
- 2005: Totale Impro / M6
- 2006: Johnny Hallyday, Flashback Tour 2006 in Bercy / TF1
- 2006: Les 40 couples stars qui ont marqué les Français / TF1 with Flavie Flament
- 2006–2007: Langues de VIP / TF1
- 2007–2008: 1 contre 100 /TF1
- 2007: Les 30 destins de stars les plus incroyables / TF1
- 2007: Les Rois du Système D / TF1 – with Églantine Éméyé
- 2007: Incroyables Destins / TF1
- 2007–2014: Secret Story (seasons 1–8) / TF1
- 2007–2011: Le Grand Quiz du cerveau (editions 1–5) / TF1 with Carole Rousseau
- 2007–2008: Le Grand Music Quiz (editions 1–2) / TF1
- 2008: 9e cérémonie des NRJ Music Awards / TF1
- 2008: Qui peut battre Benjamin Castaldi ? / TF1 – with Carole Rousseau and Denis Brogniart
- 2009: Mes parents vont t'adorer / NRJ 12
- 2010: La Ferme Célébrités en Afrique / TF1 - with Jean-Pierre Foucault
- 2010: Qui peut battre Philippe Lucas ? / TF1
- 2010: Les Stars se dépassent pour Ela / TF1
- 2011: La vie de Vynzkozy / NRJ 12
- 2012: La Roue de la fortune / TF1 with Valérie Bègue
- 2012: You Can Dance / NT1
- 2014: Tahiti Quest / Gulli
- 2014: The Winner Is / TF1
- 2015: Nouvelle Star / D8
- 2015: L'Académie des neuf / NRJ 12
- 2015: Super Million Question / NRJ 12
- 2016: Equidia Life Academy / Equidia Life
- 2016–present: Touche pas à mon poste ! / C8
- 2016: Hold Up / C8
- 2016: Big Buzz Quiz / C8
- 2017: TPMP ! Castaldi vs. Delormeau : qui sera le meilleur animateur ? / C8
- 2017: TPMP ! Les paris sont lancés / C8
- 2017: Cash Island / C8
- 2017: TPMP, le jeu : C'est que de l'amour ! / C8
- 2017: Paris à nous les Jeux ! Le grand concert / C8 : with Hervé Mathoux and Marie Portolano
- 2017: Family Battle / C8
- 2017: La Magie selon Guényanimée par Maxime Guény / C8
- 2018: La Télé même l'été ! / C8
- 2018: TPMP ! Ouvert à tous / C8
- 2018: TPMP refait la semaine / C8
- 2018: TPMP fait son bêtisier ! / C8 with Kelly Vedovelli
- 2019: TPMP : les 10 plus gros clashs à la télé / C8
- 2019: TPMP : les 20 émissions préférées des Français / C8
