= Pegasus Project revelations in India =

Political scandal in India

In India, the Pegasus Project alleged the use of Pegasus on ministers, opposition leaders, political strategists, journalists, activists, minority leaders, Supreme Court judges, religious leaders, and top officials like Election Commissioners and CBI heads. Forensic analysis by Amnesty International found attempted or successful infections on Indian phones. The Supreme Court of India later confirmed ‘malware’ in 5 of 29 devices but said it could not be conclusively identified as Pegasus and noted the government’s refusal to cooperate.

The Pegasus Project was a 17-media collaborative investigation into the cyber-arms-classified spyware built by the Israeli NSO Group and sold only to governments. It probed a leaked list of 50,000 suspected targets, including 300 from India. The Supreme Court of India appointed a technical committee for independent verification of devices submitted by those suspecting surveillance.

Many critics argue that the way the Pegasus Project revelations were handled in India by the opposition looked more like a political stunt than a demand for accountability, opposition parties disrupted Parliament, used the alleged appearance of phone numbers on leaked Pegasus target lists to raise public outrage, and pushed for a probe.

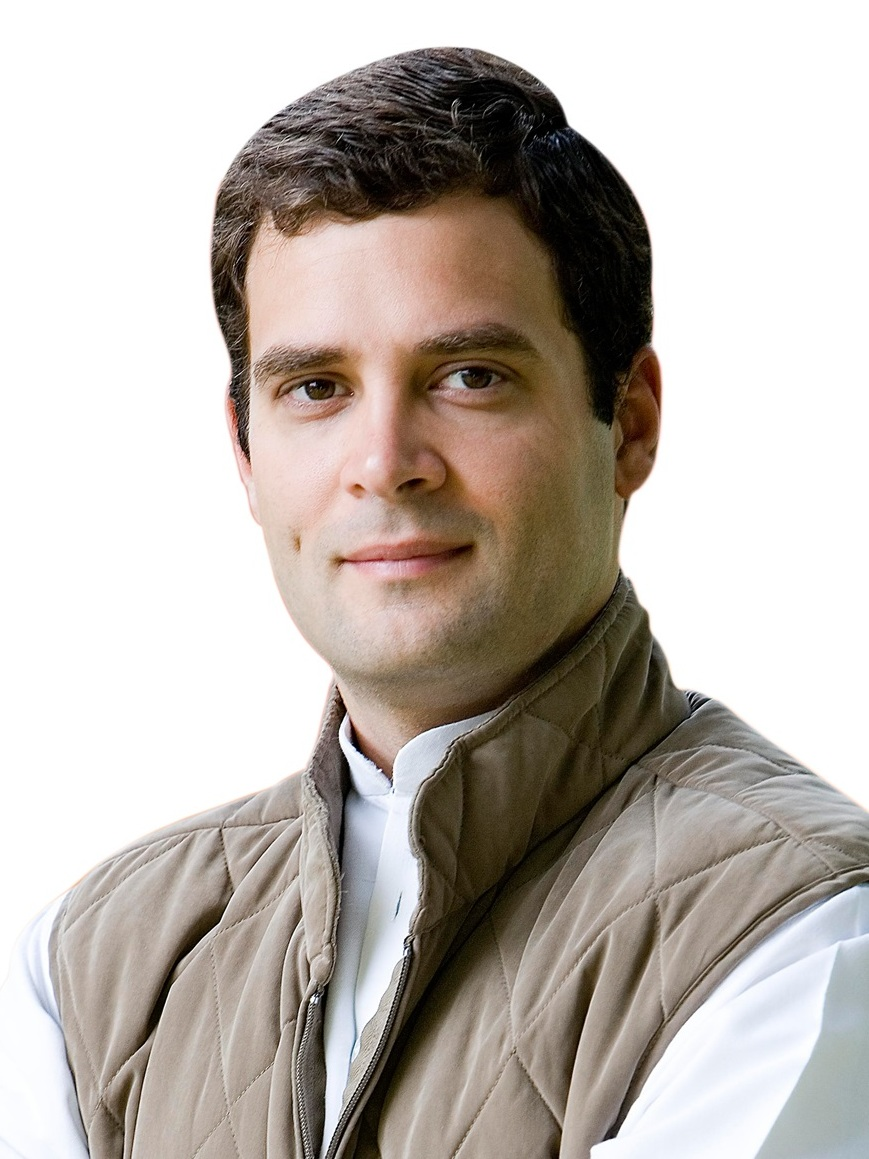
Rahul Gandhi, a prominent opposition leader in India from the Indian National Congress

== List of alleged targets ==
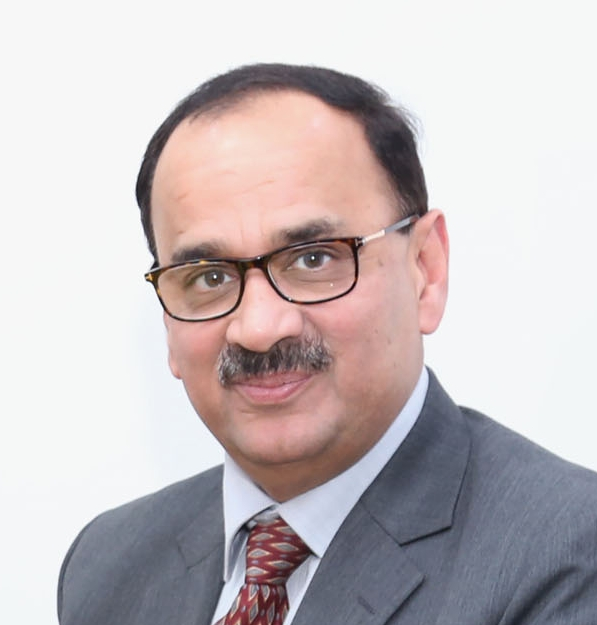
Alok Verma, former Director of the Central Bureau of Investigation

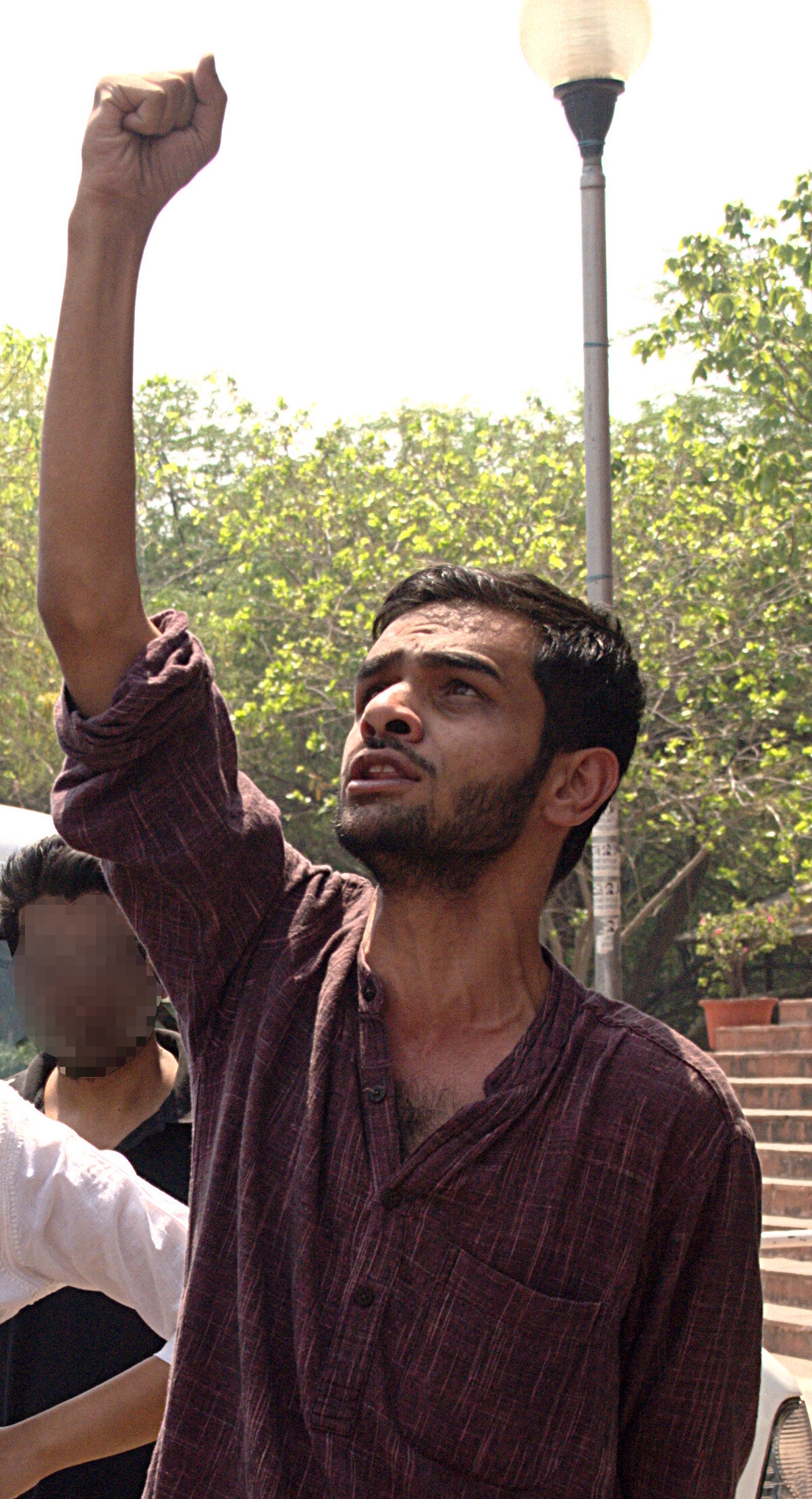
Umar Khalid, student leader and activist who is awaiting trial in prison

The following are the list of some of the alleged Indian targets according to the Pegasus Project investigations:

- Rahul Gandhi, an Indian politician and main rival of Indian Prime Minister Narendra Modi, may have been targeted on two of his cellphones. He would go on to claim that "all [his] phones are tapped".
  - Five close friends and other Indian National Congress party officials were in the leaked list of potential targets.
- Prashant Kishor, a political strategist and tactician, who is linked with several of Prime Minister Narendra Modi's rivals, may also have been targeted.
- Ashok Lavasa, an ex-Election Commissioner of India who flagged Prime Minister Narendra Modi's poll code violation in the 2019 Indian general election may have been targeted.
- Alok Verma, who was ousted as the head of the Central Bureau of Investigation (CBI) by Prime Minister Narendra Modi in 2018 may have been a target.
- Numerous Indian politicians including Deputy Chief Minister of Karnataka G. Parameshwara, as well as close aides of then Chief Minister H. D. Kumaraswamy and senior Congress leader Siddaramaiah.
- Abhishek Banerjee, a West Bengal politician of the AITC, and nephew of incumbent Chief Minister of West Bengal Mamata Banerjee.
- Siddharth Varadarajan, a New Delhi–based, American investigative journalist and founder of The Wire. Varadarajan joined the investigation of Project Pegasus.
- Umar Khalid, a left-wing student activist and leader of the Democratic Students' Union, was added to the list in late 2018, then charged with sedition. He was accused of organising riots, and charged with sedition and UAPA and arrested in September 2020. the alleged evidence was taken from his phone. He is currently in jail awaiting trial.

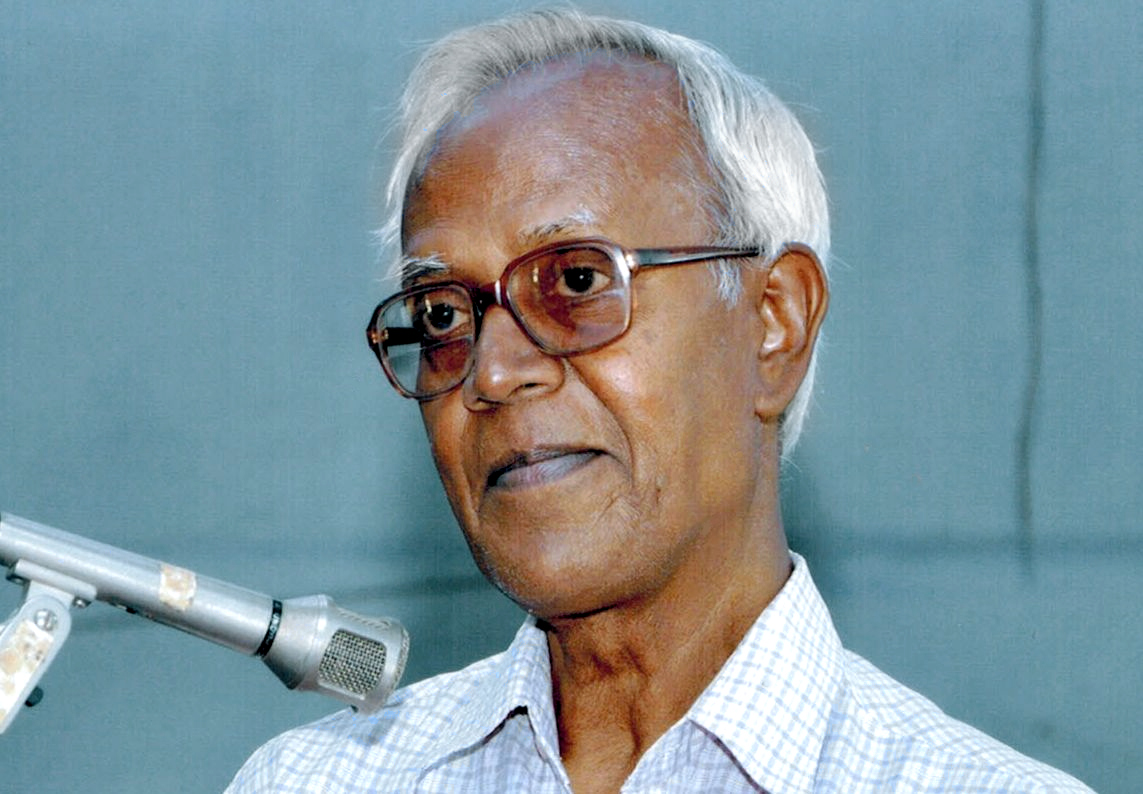
Stan Swamy, a Roman Catholic priest and tribal rights activist, was arrested on terrorism charges and imprisoned where he died in 2021 awaiting trial

- Stan Swamy, an Indian Jesuit father and activist. Swamy died in July 2021 at the age of 84 after contracting COVID-19 in prison.
  - Collaborators Hany Babu, Shoma Sen and Rona Wilson were also in the project's list of alleged targets.
- Ashwini Vaishnaw, Minister of Electronics and Information Technology who assumed office less than 3 weeks before the investigation was revealed.
- The inner circle to the 14th Dalai Lama Tenzin Gyatso, the 17th Karmapa Ogyen Trinley Dorje and other Tibetan figures, including:
  - Tempa Tsering, the Dalai Lama's envoy to Delhi
  - Tenzin Taklha, the Dalai Lama's senior aide
  - Chhimey Rigzen, the Dalai Lama's senior aide
  - Lobsang Tenzin, the 5th Samdhong Rinpoche, who is responsible for the selection of the Dalai Lama's successor
  - Lobsang Sangay, former president of the Tibetan government-in-exile
  - Penpa Tsering, president of the Tibetan government-in-exile
- 11 phone numbers associated with a female employee of the Supreme Court of India and her immediate family, who accused the former Chief Justice of India, Ranjan Gogoi, of sexual harassment, are also allegedly found on a database indicating possibility of their phones being snooped.
- VK Jain, personal assistant and aide of Arvind Kejriwal

== Reactions ==
=== Judiciary ===
The Campaign for Judicial Accountability and Reforms (CJAR) released the following statement:

Such large-scale intrusive surveillance into the personal phones of political leaders, journalists, activists is a flagrant violation of the right to privacy as upheld by the Hon'ble Supreme Court and an affront on the civil liberties of citizens.

CJAR stated that this was an attack on the independence of the judiciary and called for a response from the highest court in the land. It also stated that the snooping was patently illegal.

CJAR further stated that the allegations of hacking of a sitting Supreme Court judge of ex-Chief Justice of India Ranjan Gogoi's staffer, who accused Gogoi of sexual harassment, and her family members were of "grave seriousness". It raised the question asking why a software that was reported sold only to "vetted governments" for national security issues was used to spy on Gogoi's staffer and also demanded a probe into improper collusion between the executive and judiciary.

In the press release, they further stated:

The victimisation of the woman by the police, the many questionably judicial orders passed by benches headed by Justice Gogoi favourable to the Union Government, and Justice Gogoi's nomination to the Rajya Sabha soon after his retirement raises serious questions about such collusion

It recommended Special Investigation Team headed by a retired Supreme court judge be set up to investigate the Pegasus snooping scandal and probe if there was any improper collusion between the Union Government and the former Chief Justice of India.

=== Journalists ===
In a tweet the Press Club of India (PCI) issued a statement:

This is the first time in the history of this country that all pillars of our democracy — judiciary, Parliamentarians, media, executives & ministers — have been spied upon. This is unprecedented and the PCI condemns unequivocally. The snooping has been done for ulterior motives. What is disturbing is that a foreign agency, which has nothing to do with the national interest of the country, was engaged to spy on its citizens. This breeds distrust and will invite anarchy. The Govt should come out clean on this front and clarify.

Similarly, the Editor's Guild of India also released a statement directed against the alleged spying made by the Indian government, saying:

This act of snooping essentially conveys that journalism and political dissent are now equated with 'terror'. How can a constitutional democracy survive if governments do not make an effort to protect freedom of speech and allows surveillance with such impunity?

It asked for a Supreme Court monitored enquiry into the matter, and further demanded that the inquiry committee should include people of impeccable credibility from different walks of life—including journalists and civil society—so that it can independently investigate the facts around the extent and intent of snooping using the services of Pegasus.

Senior journalists N Ram and Sashi Kumar approached the Supreme Court to seek an investigation into the matter. They stated that the targeted surveillance "grossly disproportionate invasion of the right to privacy". A bench headed by Chief Justice of India N. V. Ramana is set to hear the petition.

Some news articles were released making claims that Amnesty never claimed that the leaked phone numbers were of NSO's Pegasus spyware list. These claims where repeated by some BJP leaders. However, these reports were later proven to be false, and Amnesty issued a statement stating that it categorically stands by the findings of the investigation and that the data is irrefutably linked to potential targets of NSO Group's Pegasus spyware.

=== Union government ===
The Union government denied the request for a probe or investigation or an independent Supreme Court inquiry by the opposition into the matter. The former IT minister of India Ravi Shankar Prasad asked, "If more than 45 nations are using Pegasus as NSO has said, why is only India being targeted?"

Many members of the government and the ruling BJP party such as home Minister of Home and Internal Security Amit Shah, Minister of Electronics & Information Technology Ashwini Vaishnaw, Uttar Pradesh Chief Minister Yogi Adityanath, Karnataka Chief Minister Basavaraj Bommai, Assam Chief Minister Himanta Biswa Sarma and Devendra Fadnavis have alleged that the Pegasus Project is an international conspiracy to malign Indian democracy and defame India. Vaishnaw stated the report came one day before the monsoon session of Parliament and that "this cannot be a coincidence" and Yogi Adityanath said "the opposition, knowingly or unknowingly, is falling prey to the international conspiracy." Devendra Fadnavis said that "the opposition doesn't want the parliament to run smoothly. Pegasus project is a conspiracy to ruin the nation".

The official response of the government of India to The Washington Post stated that "[t]he allegations regarding government surveillance on specific people has no concrete basis or truth associated with it whatsoever" and that such news reports were an attempt to "malign the Indian democracy and its institutions". They further stated that each case of interception, monitoring and decryption is approved by the Union Home Secretary and that there exists an oversight mechanism in the form of a review committee headed by the Union Cabinet Secretary and that any such interceptions have been done under the due process of law.

Ashwini Vaishnaw in a statement in parliament stated that the reports were "highly sensational" and that they had "no factual basis". He further stated that NSO themselves had rubbished the claims. He stated that the existence of numbers in a list was not sufficient evidence to indicate that the spyware was used and said that the report itself stated the same and without the physical examination of the phone such claims cannot be corroborated.

Amit Shah in a statement on his blog insinuated that this was an attempt to disrupt the monsoon session of the parliament and that the opposition parties were "jumping on a bandwagon" and were trying to "derail anything progressive that comes up in Parliament". He stated that the report was an attempt to "derail India's development trajectory through their conspiracies".

Replying to allegations from the opposition, Minister of State in Ministry of Home Affairs Ajay Kumar Mishra said that there is no reason for a probe and the people who made the allegations are "political failures".

=== Opposition ===
On 27 July 2021 ten opposition parties met to coordinate their response to move joint adjournment notice in Lok Sabha to discuss the Pegasus snooping issue. The meeting was attended by leaders of Congress, NCP, Shiv Sena, DMK, National Conference, RSP, IUML, BSP and CPI M.

On 28 July 2021 a similar meeting of leaders of fourteen opposition parties to with the same aim took place. Leaders from the Congress, DMK, NCP, Shiv Sena, RJD, SP, CPI M, CPI, NC, AAP, IUML, RSP, KCM and VCK where in attendance.

==== Indian National Congress ====
The Indian National Congress accused Prime Minister Narendra Modi of "treason" and compromising national security following the release of the reports and called for the removal of Minister of Home and Internal Security Amit Shah and an investigation of the role of Prime Minister Narendra Modi into the affair. Rahul Gandhi, the leader of the Indian National Congress, later claimed that the Prime Minister "hit the soul of democracy" by using Pegasus. He went on to chair a meeting consisting of many opposition parties to push jointly in the Parliament for discussion on Pegasus.

Shashi Tharoor, a senior leader of the Indian National Congress and the head of the Parliamentary Standing Committee on Information Technology. The committee summoned officials of Ministry of Information Technology & Ministry of Home Affairs for questioning regarding the matter. However, the committee was unable to meet as the BJP members of the committee refused to register their attendance despite being present, and the quorum was not met. As a reaction to this, a member of a committee stated: "what happened today shows the lengths to which BJP is willing to go in order to not discuss the Pegasus spyware issue".

Tharoor also demanded a Supreme Court judge-monitored probe into the issue and stated that the opposition would continue to bring up the issue in the Parliament until the central government would agree to discuss the issue. He alleged that the central government made use of tax payer's money for political gains.

The former home minister and finance minister, P Chidambaram, pointed out that other countries such as France and Israel have begun their own investigation into the matter, and that "only Indian government not concerned about Pegasus issue". He also said that the prime minister must make a statement in the Parliament to clarify whether or not snooping has been done by the central government. He further stated that the government has an "ostrich-like attitude" because of their avoidance of discussion on the subject in parliament.

==== All India Trinamool Congress ====
West Bengal Chief Minister Mamata Banerjee, from the AITC, alleged that the central government intends to "turn India into a surveillance state" where "democracy is in danger". She also claimed that Pegasus was used to keep track of the meetings between her and Prashant Kishore during the 2021 West Bengal elections. She also said that she had to tape her phone to avoid being spied on.

She accused the central government of sitting idle on the matter and set up a judicial inquiry panel to investigate the allegations that were revealed by the Pegasus Project. She further sought an all party meeting to discuss the matter.

==== CPI (M) ====
Advocate M L Sharma and John Brittas, a member of the Rajya Sabha of the CPI (M) party filed a petition that sought a court-monitored probe into the allegations of unauthorised use of the Pegasus spyware on Indian citizens. The petition alleged that the use of Pegasus on Indian citizens was a "serious attack upon Indian democracy, judiciary and country’s security."

The petition stated that there were two possibilities – either the snooping was carried out by the Government of India or a foreign agency. It said that if the act was carried out by the government, it would amount to unauthorised spying on Indian citizens and that the spending of resources for political gain by the ruling party should not be allowed. The petition stated if the snooping was carried out by a foreign actor, that it would be an "act of external aggression" that needed to be investigated.

==== Shiv Sena ====
Sanjay Raut, a politician from Shiv Sena stated that "mobile phones have become virtual bombs" and are used to keep tab of the opponents of the ruling party. He questioned the government regarding the source of funding for the use of Pegasus. He called for probe into the matter stating that to snoop on 300 phones would have cost at least $48 million.

== Investigations ==
The central government stated that there is no "factual basis" and denied oppositions request for an investigation or court monitored enquiry into the matter.

West Bengal Chief Minister Mamata Banerjee set up an inquiry commission to probe Pegasus spyware which was stayed by the Supreme court of India. Her cabinet approved the formation of a two-member inquiry commission led by retired Supreme Court Justice Madan B. Lokur with former Calcutta High Court Acting Chief Justice Jyotirmay Bhattacharya. Chief Minister Banerjee said that she wished for a central committee, but had to set up a state government committee due to the central government's inaction on the matter. Some politicians such as BJP member Dilip Ghosh, dismissed the committee and called it "drama" to divert people's attention. On 28 October 2021, the honourable Supreme Court of India agreeing that a central-based inquiry was needed, ordered an independent probe into the issue by a three-member committee. The West Bengal government agreed not to have their commission function parallel with the committee of the Supreme Court; however, the independent state commission continued to operate until December 2021 when ordered directly by the Supreme Court to cease.

On 25 August 2022 the head of the Supreme Court appointed committee, Chief Justice N. V. Ramana, submitted a report stating that they had found some malware in 5 of the 29 phones examined, but there was no conclusive proof that the malware was the Pegasus. Further the court noted that the Central government, accused of putting the Pegasus spyware into the target's phones, did not cooperate into the matter. The report by the technical committee was not shared with the public, though the Chief Justice N. V. Ramana's suggested uploading parts of it on the court's website.

== See also ==
- Democratic backsliding
- WhatsApp snooping scandal
- Tek Fog
