= Pegasus Project =

Pegasus Project may refer to:

- A highway construction project on Interstate 30 and Interstate 35E (Texas) in Dallas, Texas
- The Pegasus Project, an episode in season 10 of American-Canadian television series Stargate SG-1
- Pegasus Project (investigation), reporting on Pegasus spyware
- Project Pegasus (comics), a fictional scientific base in Marvel comics and other media
