= Lesgourgues =

Lesgourgues is a surname. Notable people with the surname include:

- Alice Lesgourgues (born 2000), French professional field hockey player
- Olivier Lesgourgues (born 1962), French television presenter and producer
- Yann Lesgourgues (born 1991), French rugby union footballer
