= Alaa al-Siddiq =

Emirati poet (1988–2021)

- Born: 18 June 1988; Sharjah, United Arab Emirates
- Died: 19 June 2021 (aged 33); Shipton-under-Wychwood, Oxfordshire, United Kingdom
- Occupation(s): Poet, Human Rights Researcher and Advocate

Alaa Al-Siddiq (Arabic: آلاء الصدّيق; 18 June 1988 – 19 June 2021) was a UK-based Emirati poet and a prominent human rights activist.

== Education ==
Born in Sharjah to an educated and religious family, Alaa received a bachelor's degree in Shariah from the University of Sharjah in 2010, graduating with first class honors. She was the president of the Emirates National Student Union between 2007 and 2008. In the context of the 2011 Arab Spring, Alaa had begun creating a youth petition group made up of fellow students and would have frequent meetups both in person and online to discuss human rights issues and what they can do to improve the lives of other Emirates. Alaa went on to obtain a post-graduate diploma in education from the University of Sharjah. Following the detention of her father, Mohammed al-Siddiq, and increased state repression against activists and reformists, Alaa moved to Qatar in 2012 along with her husband seeking asylum. She resided there for a few years and pursued a master's degree in public policy from Hamad Bin Khalifa University, graduating in 2016.

== Career ==
Afterwards she relocated to the United Kingdom, where she served as the executive director of ALQST, an organization that advocates for human rights in the United Arab Emirates and the wider Arab world. In January 2018, Sheikh Mohammed bin Abdulrahman Al Thani, Minister of Foreign Affairs of Qatar at the time, made a statement in an interview discussing ongoing conflicts with the UAE since 2015 over political prisoners and revealed that the Emirati government had been repeatedly pressing for a particular woman to be extradited to the UAE for trial. A statement on Twitter by Abdullah bin Hamad Al-Athba, editor in chief of Al Arab, revealed that the woman being referred to was Alaa al-Siddiq and that Qatar had been adamant about refusing such demands, saying that their legal system does not allow for extradition for political prisoners. Soon after this UAE-based newspapers, including Al-Ittihad and Al-Ain, released statements about Alaa that called her a "terrorist" and claimed that she fled the UAE using a forged Syrian passport from the Qatari government in order to become a leader of the Muslim Brotherhood first in the Gulf and then in the UK.

In August 2020, Alaa was one of the main speakers at an online symposium titled "Gulf Coalition Against Normalization", where more than 800 activists from across the Gulf States attended. She emphasized that all activists must resist normalization of ongoing and increasing restrictions on freedoms from their governments.

In July 2021, she was confirmed to be one of the persons of interest of the Pegasus software, used by UAE.

== Personal life ==
Her father is the prominent academic and reformist Mohammad al-Siddiq, who has been held in arbitrary detention by the Emirati regime since 2012, along with other political prisoners of conscience. Born in Sharjah, al-Siddiq was a prominent Shariah professor who had taught at the United Arab Emirates University and University of Sharjah, and served on the boards of several financial and Islamic banking entities in the country. Mohammad al-Siddiq was stripped of his citizenship by the UAE, which also denied his children work placements and scholarships, before eventually making them stateless, too.

== Death ==
Alaa died in an accident on Saturday, 19 June 2021, at the age of 33, when the car in which she rode along with friends collided with another car at a junction on the A361 and the B4437 south of Shipton-under-Wychwood, in Oxfordshire, at around 20:30.

The humans rights group Democracy for the Arab World Now (DAWN), has called on United Kingdom to investigate any possibility that her death was caused by foul play.

An executive director of the Gulf Center for Human Rights, Khalid Ibrahim said that after starting work for ALQST "she knew that risk doubled", knowing "what happened to Jamal Khashoggi". A Saudi Arabia dissident, Omar Abdulaziz, released a video stating that Alaa al-Siddiq's phone was hacked by the Emirati intelligence through the Israeli company NSO, through the malware Pegasus.

DAWN urged the UAE Regime to repatriate al-Siddiq's body to the Emirates to allow her to be buried in her homeland. The group also asked the UAE to allow her father Mohammed Abdul Razzaq al-Siddiq, who is a prisoner in conscience in the UAE, to be allowed to attend his daughter's funeral. Both requests were turned down by Emirates authorities. Alaa al-Siddiq was laid to rest in Qatar on 27 June 2021, as per her family's request.
