= Place des grands hommes =

1991 single by Patrick Bruel

Single by Patrick Bruel

from the album Alors regarde
- B-side: "La fille de l'aéroport"
- Released: 1991
- Recorded: 1989
- Genre: Pop
- Length: 4:28
- Label: RCA
- Songwriters: Patrick Bruel, Bruno Garcin
- Producers: Patrick Bruel, Mick Lanaro

Patrick Bruel singles chronology
| "Alors regarde" (1990) | "Place des grands hommes" (1991) | "Décalé" (1991) |

"Place des grands hommes" (English: "Place of Great Men") is a 1989 song recorded by French singer Patrick Bruel. Written by Bruel and Bruno Garcin, it was the fourth single from the album Alors regarde, on which it appears as the seventh track, and was released in February 1991. It was successful in France, becoming a top four hit and Bruel's one of the most famous songs.

== Background and writing ==
"Place des grands hommes" was originally written for the French TV programme Avis de recherche, where Patrick Bruel reunited with his classmates several years later as in the song. Lyrically, the song deals with the narrator who imagines his reunion, at a location named the "Place des grands hommes", with a group of friends who have not seen each other for ten years. He expresses the feelings he might have at this meeting, their mutual surprises when noting the life changes experienced by each participant, and wonders whether he should go or not to this reunion. He eventually decides to participate to the event, seeing the others, who he believes may have become "great men." The Place des grands hommes does not directly refer to the square in Bordeaux, bearing that exact name, but rather to the Place du Panthéon in Paris, where the remains of the great men and women of the Nation are interred. It can be accessed by the rue Soufflot, also mentioned in the song.

== Chart performance ==
In France, "Place des grands hommes" debuted at number 30 on the chart edition of 23 February 1991, reached the top ten four weeks later, peaked at number four in its 13th and 14th weeks, and totalled 11 weeks in the top ten and 21 weeks in the top 50. On the European Hot 100, it started at number 90 on 16 March 1991, reached a peak of number 28 in its 12th week and had a 17-week chart run. Meanwhile, as it was regularly played on radio, it entered the European Airplay Top 50 at number 38 on 16 February 1991, climbed to number 16 at best in its seventh week and fell off the chart after 18 weeks of presence.

== Track listings ==
- CD single
1. "Place des grands hommes" — 4:28
2. "La fille de l'aéroport" — 3:23
- 7" single
1. "Place des grands hommes" — 4:28
2. "La fille de l'aéroport" — 3:23

== Charts ==
| Chart (1991) | Peak position |
|---|---|
| Europe (European Airplay Top 50) | 16 |
| Europe (European Hot 100) | 28 |
| France (SNEP) | 4 |
| Quebec (ADISQ) | 3 |

== Release history ==
| Country | Date | Format | Label |
|---|---|---|---|
| France | February 1991 | CD single | RCA |
| France | February 1991 | 7" single | RCA |
