= Patrick Bruel =

French singer-songwriter, actor, and poker player (born 1959)

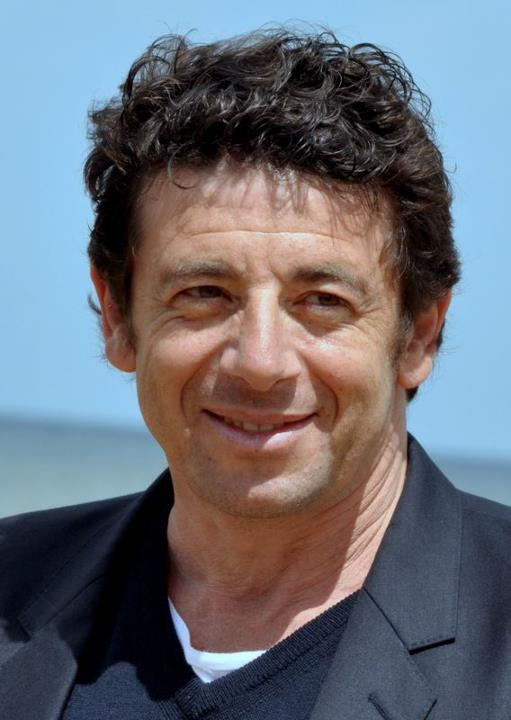
- Bruel in 2012
- Born: Patrick Benguigui; 14 May 1959 (age 67); Tlemcen, Algeria
- Occupations: Singer, songwriter, actor
- Years active: 1979–present

World Series of Poker
- Bracelet: 1
- Money finishes: 10
- Highest WSOP Main Event finish: 428th, 2009

World Poker Tour
- Title: None
- Final table: 1
- Money finishes: 4

European Poker Tour
- Title: None
- Final table: 1
- Money finish: 1
- Website: www.patrickbruel.com

Patrick Benguigui (French: [patʁik bɛnɡiɡi]; born 14 May 1959), better known by his stage name Patrick Bruel (French: [patʁik bʁyɛl]), is a French singer-songwriter, actor, and professional poker player.

In mid-2026, multiple women came forward to accuse him of sexual assault and rape, including on underage girls. In June 2026, he was taken into custody following an investigation by prosecutors.

== Early life ==
Patrick Benguigui was born on 14 May 1959 in Tlemcen, Algeria, into a family of Algerian Sephardic Jewish origin. His parents separated in 1960, and he was raised by his mother. Together, the two emigrated to France in June 1962 just before Algerian independence. He lived in the staff accommodation of the girls' school in Argenteuil where his mother was a teacher.

In his youth, Bruel aspired to be a football player, but decided instead to pursue singing after seeing Michel Sardou in 1975.

== Career ==
=== Acting and music careers ===
His first success came as an actor, in 1979's Le Coup de sirocco. He continued acting in films, on television, and in the theatre while pursuing his singing career. His first single, "Vide" ("Empty"), released in 1982, was not a success, but the follow-up, "Marre de cette nana-là" ("Fed up with that chick"), was a hit.

In 2002, Bruel released Entre Deux, a double CD of classic chanson that features duets with Charles Aznavour, Jean-Louis Aubert, Jean-Jacques Goldman, Alain Souchon, and Renaud, among others. It sold two million copies and made Bruel France's best paid singer of the year. At the beginning of 2005, in response to the South Asian tsunami of 26 December 2004, Bruel wrote the song "Et puis la terre" with Marie-Florence Gros, with whom he had begun a long-term collaboration in 1998, to benefit the Red Cross. His album "Des souvenirs devant", was his fourth chart-topper in France.

=== Poker ===
Bruel is a world-class professional poker player. He won a World Series of Poker bracelet in 1998 for the $5,000 Limit Hold'em event. As of 2009, he had earned more than $900,000 in tournament play, of which his ten cash winnings at the WSOP accounted for $411,659.

In 2005, Bruel began commentating on the World Poker Tour for Canal+ in France.

=== World Series of Poker bracelet ===
Year	Tournament	Prize (US$)
1998	$5,000 Limit Hold'em	$224,000

== Personal life ==
In 2003, just before his partner, the writer and playwright Amanda Sthers, gave birth to his first child, he changed his name to Bruel-Benguigui, combining his stage name with his birth name. On 21 September 2004, he wed Sthers. They had another child 2005, but separated in 2007.

In the 2010s, Bruel bought a house in Pacific Palisades, Los Angeles. In January 2025, the house was destroyed by the Palisades Fire.

== Legal proceedings ==
=== Insulting police officers and causing injury ===
On 24 January 2014, he was fined €10,000 for insulting police officers and unintentionally causing injury to officers stationed at a roadblock on the sidelines of a demonstration.

=== Accusation of sexual violence and rape ===
In 2020, following two preliminary investigations, Nanterre public prosecutor’s office closed two cases without further action, finding insufficient evidence to establish that a criminal offence had been committed. Complaints alleging indecent exposure and sexual harassment in one case, and sexual assault in the other, had been filed against the singer in 2019 by two massage therapists working in Porticcio and Perpignan, respectively. Bruel denied the allegations. Three other massage therapists reported similar alleged incidents, which he also denied. A complaint by Anne, a singer, alleging rape in 2010 was added to the proceedings, which included nine witness accounts, and was also closed without further action.

On 18 March 2026, French journalist Marine Turchi published an investigation in Mediapart reporting that eight women, one of whom was a minor at the time of the alleged incident, had accused Patrick Bruel of sexist and sexual violence between 1992 and 2009. Specifically:

- A preliminary investigation was under way after a woman filed a complaint with the Saint-Malo public prosecutor’s office in September 2024, accusing Bruel of raping her in October 2012 during the Dinard British Film Festival;
- A preliminary investigation was opened in mid-April following a complaint filed on 12 March 2026 by Daniela Elstner, managing director of Unifrance, alleging attempted rape and sexual assault at the Acapulco French Film Festival in 1997. Elstner reiterated her allegations to the police on 4 May 2026;
- A preliminary investigation was opened in Belgium after Belgian press officer Karine Viseur filed a new complaint on 24 March 2026 alleging sexual assault in 2010. She had previously withdrawn the complaint she had filed at the time.

On 13 April 2026, Elle magazine cited four other women who alleged that they had been subjected to sexual violence by the singer. A complaint of rape and sexual assault filed by one of them, Ophélie Fajfer, had been closed without further action in 2022. A journalist filed a complaint with the Paris public prosecutor’s office alleging attempted rape in connection with an incident said to have occurred in 2000. Irène, a former employee of Bertelsmann Music Group, filed a complaint on 18 May alleging sexual assault and attempted rape in connection with incidents that occurred in 2002 and 2003.

Bruel denies all the allegations, rejecting any claims of “violence, coercion or threats”.

On 7 May 2026, a Mediapart article by Marine Turchi revealed fifteen new accounts alleging sexual violence by Patrick Bruel between 1991 and 2019, some of which were alleged to have involved drug-facilitated sexual assault. His lawyer described the allegations as defamatory.

On 12 May 2026, two women filed new complaints with the Nanterre court, joining the proceedings as civil parties, over allegations of sexual violence. Their previous complaints had been closed without further action in 2020: Julia, a massage therapist in Perpignan, alleged an incident in 2019, while Anne, a singer, alleged incidents dating from 2010.

On 15 May 2026, French television presenter Flavie Flament announced that she was one of the fifteen women and that she had filed a complaint against Bruel. She accused him of raping her in 1991, when she was 16. According to Bruel’s lawyers, their client “never drugged Flavie Flament and never forced her to have [sexual] intercourse”; they described the relationship as “occasional”.

On 17 May 2026, Paris public prosecutor Laure Beccuau announced that eight of the nine complaints of sexual violence against Patrick Bruel would be consolidated at Nanterre public prosecutor’s office, which had jurisdiction based on his place of residence. The following day, the Nanterre prosecutor’s office announced that it was reopening Ophélie Fajfer’s complaint of rape and sexual assault, which had been closed without further action in 2022 and concerned alleged incidents dating from 2015.

On 3 June 2026, France Info reported numerous anonymous accounts posted on social media or gathered by the broadcaster. The individuals, who had worked within the singer’s professional circle, broadly agreed that his reputation had long been known in the entertainment industry. Several said that young women were routinely warned about him and advised to avoid being alone with him. One witness said that they had seen him behave flirtatiously towards their own 16-year-old daughter. In addition, a “handful of celebrities” publicly acknowledged having heard about Bruel’s behaviour, describing him in terms ranging from simply a “great seducer” to “someone who [should] seek treatment”.

On 8 June 2026, Bruel was taken into custody following allegations of attempted sexual assault and rape against 13 women dating to 1997. On 10 June, the public prosecutor requested that he be placed under formal investigation for alleged rapes, attempted rapes, sexual assaults and sexual harassment involving nine complainants, allegedly committed between 2010 and 2019, and that he be remanded in custody. He was placed under judicial supervision, formally investigated in four cases and given assisted-witness status in four others. As a result, Bruel cancelled most of his public performances.

On 28 July 2026, BFM TV reported that at least 31 complaints had been filed. On the same day, Mediapart reported that Patrick Bruel had been placed under formal investigation in four cases and given assisted-witness status in four others. The four investigating judges were also examining allegations made by thirteen other women that “appear, at first sight, to be time-barred”, in addition to six complaints filed since he was placed under formal investigation in mid-June 2026.

Some mayors, including those from Marseille, Nantes, Paris, Nancy, Lille and Brest, have asked Bruel to cancel his concerts in their cities. The mayor of Forest in Belgium also asked to cancel the concert that Bruel was supposed to do at Forest National on 6 October 2026.

== Philanthropy ==
Bruel had been a member of the Les Enfoirés charity ensemble since 1993 until his departure in 2026 due to the numerous allegations of sexual assault and rape against him.

== Selected filmography ==
- Le coup de sirocco (1979) – Paulo Narboni
- Un pas dans la forêt (1980, TV Movie) – Pierre
- La mort en sautoir (1980, TV Movie) – Un 'loubard'
- Le Rembrandt de Verrières (1981, TV Movie)
- Les enquêtes du commissaire Maigret (1981, TV Series) – Louis
- Ma femme s'appelle reviens (1982) – François
- Paris-Saint-Lazare (1982, TV Mini-Series) – Un lycéen
- Les diplômés du dernier rang (1982) – Philippe
- Le bâtard (1983) – Dan
- Le grand carnaval (1983) – Pierre–Marie Labrouche
- Les malheurs de Malou (1984, TV Movie) – José
- Marche à l'ombre (1984) – Le guitariste du métro (uncredited)
- La tête dans le sac (1984) – Dany
- Les amours des années 50 (1985, TV Series)
- Le mariage blues (1985, TV Movie) – Michel
- Profs (1985) – Frédéric Game
- Suivez mon regard (1986) – Le musicien
- Attention bandits! (1986) – Mozart
- La maison assassinée (1988) – Séraphin Monge
- Champagne amer (1989) – Wanis
- L'union sacrée(1989) – Simon Atlan – un inspecteur de police juif impulsif et violent
- Force majeure (1989) – Philippe
- Il y a des jours... et des lunes (1990) – The musician who missed his plane
- Toutes peines confondues (1992) – Christophe / detective
- Profil bas (1993) – Inspector Julien Segal
- A Hundred and One Nights (1995) – Le premier orateur
- Sabrina (1995) – Louis
- Le Jaguar (1996) – François Perrin
- K (1997) – L'inspecteur de police Sam Bellamy
- Paparazzi (1998) – Patrick Bruel
- The Misadventures of Margaret (1998) – Martin
- Hors jeu (1998) – Patrick Bruel
- Lost & Found (1999) – Rene
- Le marquis (2000, Short) – Le marquis
- Pretty Things (2001) – Jacques
- The Milk of Human Kindness (2001) – Laurent
- Une vie à t'attendre (2004) – Alex
- The Wolf (2004) – Nelson
- Comedy of Power (2006) – Jacques Sibaud
- O Jerusalem (2006) – David Levin
- A Secret (2007) – Maxime Nathan Grinberg / Grimbert
- Change of Plans (2009) – Le docteur Alain Carcassonne
- Desperate Parents (2009)
- Comme les cinq doigts de la main (2010) – Dan Hayoun
- The Writer (2011)
- Paris Manhattan (2012) – Victor
- What's in a Name? (2012) – Vincent
- Les gamins (2013) – Le sosie de Patrick Bruel
- Les Yeux jaunes des crocodiles (2014) – Philippe Dupin
- The Missionaries (2014) – Lambert Levallois
- Love at First Child (2015) – Ange
- Un sac de billes (2017) – Roman Joffo
- Holy Lands (2017) – Michel
- A Family (2017) – Vincenzo / Husband
- The Best Is Yet to Come (2019) – César
- Villa Caprice (2020) – Gilles Fontaine
- State of Alert (2025) - Zeev Abadi

== Discography ==
=== Albums ===
==== Studio albums ====
Year	Album	Chart				
Year	Album	FR	BEL (Wa)	BEL (Fl)	SWI	NL
1982	Vide	—	—	—	—	—
1984	De face	32	—	—	—	—
1989	Alors, regarde	1	5	—	—	35
1994	Bruel	2	—	—	—	47
1995	Plaza de los héroes	—	—	—	—	—
1999	Juste avant	1	1	—	32	43
2002	Entre deux	1	1	—	2	49
2006	Des souvenirs devant	1	1	—	6	69
2012	Lequel de nous	1	1	58	7	—
2015	Très souvent, je pense à vous...	5	4	119	6	—
2018	Ce soir on sort...	—	2	49	2	—
2022	Encore une fois	2	1	70	3	—

==== Live albums ====
Year	Album	Chart				
Year	Album	FR	BEL (Wa)	BEL (Fl)	SWI	NL
1987	À tout à l'heure	—	—	—	—	—
1991	Si ce soir...	1	—	—	—	51
1995	On s'était dit...	25	9	—	—	—
2001	Rien ne s'efface...	2	1	—	12	—
2003	Entre deux à l'Olympia	21	16	—	—	—
2007	Des Souvenirs... ensemble	12	8	—	45	—
2009	Seul... ou presque	9	3	—	41	—
2014	Live 2014	6	4	119	25	—
2016	Bruel Barbara – Le Châtelet	56	28	—	—	—
2020	Ce Soir Ensemble: Tour 2019-2020	15	3	—	30	—

==== Compilations ====
Year	Album	Chart		
Year	Album	FR	BEL (Wa)	SWI
2001	L'Essentiel	81	—	—
2003	Les Talents essentiels	23	—	—
2004	Puzzle	1	2	21
2007	S'laisser aimer (3 CD)	—	—	—

=== Singles ===
Year	Single	Chart				Album
Year	Single	FR	BEL (Wa)	SWI	NL	Album
1984	"Marre de cette nana-là !"	—	—	—	—	De face
1985	"Comment ça va pour vous ?"	27	—	—	—	De face
1986	"Non, j'veux pas"	—	—	—	—	De face
1986	"J'roule vers toi"	—	—	—	—	De face
1987	"Tout l'monde peut s'tromper"	—	—	—	—	De face
1989	"Casser la voix"	3	—	—	77	Alors regarde
1990	"J'te l'dis quand même"	12	—	—	—	Alors regarde
1990	"Alors regarde"	3	—	—	—	Alors regarde
1991	"Place des grands hommes"	4	—	—	—	Alors regarde
1991	"Décalé"	15	—	—	66	Alors regarde
1991	"Qui a le droit..." (Live)	1	—	—	—	Si ce soir...
1992	"Casser la voix" (Live)	—	—	—	8	Si ce soir...
1992	"J'te l'dis quand même" (Live)	—	—	—	45	Si ce soir...
1992	"Décalé" (Live) (Patrick Bruel with Mariza Corréa)	—	—	—	70	Si ce soir...
1992	"Elle m'regardait comme ça"	—	—	—	82	Alors regarde / Si ce soir...
1994	"Bouge!"	22	—	—	—	Bruel
1994	"Combien de murs..."	8	—	—	—	Bruel
1994	"Pars pas..."	—	—	—	—	Bruel
1995	"J'suis quand même là"	—	—	—	—	Bruel
1996	"Pour exister" (Live)	—	18	—	—	On s'était dit...
1999	"J'te mentirais..."	—	—	—	81	Juste avant
2000	"Pour la vie"	13	22	90	92	Juste avant
2000	"Au Café des délices"	13	20	—	—	Juste avant
2000	"Tout s'efface"	36	32	—	95	Juste avant
2002	"Mon Amant de Saint Jean"	14	33	—	—	Entre deux
2002	"La Complainte de la butte" (Patrick Bruel & Francis Cabrel)	48	—	—	—	Entre deux
2002	"Ménilmontant" (Patrick Bruel & Charles Aznavour)	—	—	—	—	Entre deux
2006	"J'm'attendais pas à toi"	—	39	—	—	Des Souvenirs devant
2008	"Raconte-moi"	—	68	—	—	Des Souvenirs... ensemble
2009	"Combien de murs..." (Live)	—	—	—	—	Seul... ou presque
2012	"Lequel de nous"	35	32	—	—	
2015	"Pourquoi ne pas y croire..." (Patrick Bruel, Youness El Guezouli & Idan Raichel)	168	—	—	—	
2015	"Corsica" (Patrick Fiori & Patrick Bruel)	31	—	—	—	
2018	"Tout recommencer"	—	45	—	—	
2019	"Pas eu le temps"	—	39	—	—	
2023	"Origami" (with Ycare)	—	42	—	—	
2025	"Démodé" (with Jean-Luc Fonck)	—	3	—	—	

Featured in and collective collaborations

Year	Single	Chart				Album
Year	Single	FR	BEL (Wa)	SWI	NL	Album
2006	"Dit is mijn stem (Casser la voix)" (Xander de Buisonjé feat. Patrick Bruel)	—	—	—	64	Succes (Xander de Buisonjé album)
2009	"Je n'attendais que vous" (Christophe Maé, Catherine Lara, Maurane, Patrick Bruel)	—	38	—	—	2009: Les Enfoirés font leur cinéma
2010	"Parce que c'est toi" (Grégoire, Zazie, Patrick Bruel, Natasha St-Pier)	—	30	—	—	2010: Les Enfoirés... la crise de nerfs!
2013	"Un arc en ciel" (Téléthon 2013) (Bénabar, Bruel, Cali & Marina )	1	—	—	—	

Preceded by Michel Sardou	Victoires de la Musique; Male artist of the year 1992	Succeeded by Alain Bashung
