= Marine Turchi =

French investigative journalist (born 1982)

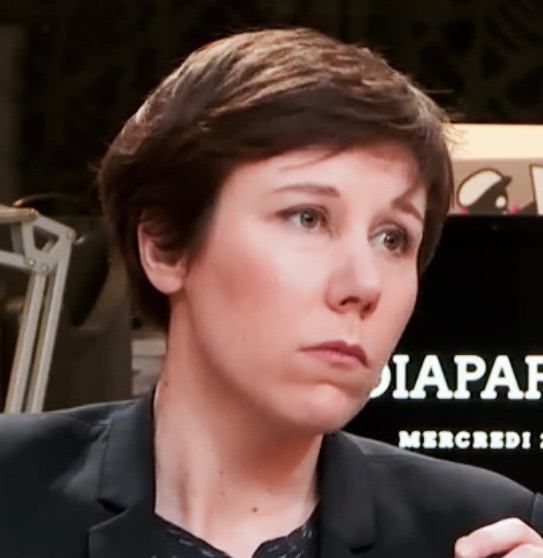
- Marine Turchi in 2019
- Born: 1982 (age 43–44)
- Citizenship: French
- Education: Sciences Po Lille (2005); École supérieure de journalisme de Lille (2007)
- Occupations: Investigative journalist, teacher
- Employer: Mediapart

Marine Turchi (born 1982) is a French investigative journalist. As a member of Mediapart’s editorial staff since its funding, she specializes in reporting on National Front and sexual violence.

== Biography ==
=== Education ===
Marine Turchi says that she has had a passion for politics since childhood, coupled with a desire to seek out the truth. After graduating from Sciences-Po Lille in 2005, Turchi wrote her first articles for La Dépêche du Midi before enrolling at École supérieure de journalisme de Lille (ESJ).

She graduated in 2007, specializing in print and multimedia journalism. With a strong interest in politics, she conducted various investigations in the Nord department and, while learning in Le Monde’s France section, covered Jean-Marie Le Pen’s election campaign. She also worked in the society section of Le Nouvel Observateur.

In 2007, she won the Charles Gide Prize for journalism students, awarded for the best report on the social and solidairity economy. She also received the 2007 Bayard Presse for Young Journalists for her article “Apprendre le b.a.-ba sur le Web” (“Learning the Basics on the Web”), published in La Croix.

She then joined the editorial staff of the magazine Télé 2 semaines for seven months after being selected for the Prisma Presse Academy.

=== Career ===
Shortly after graduating, Marine Turchi joined Mediapart’s team when the publication was founded in 2008. She was the youngest journalist on its editorial staff at the time.

==== Coverage of the far right (2008-2017) ====
For nine years, she focused on National Front (FN), the political right and the links between the two. According to Marie Claire, she quickly became the “bête noire of the FN, particularly former members of GUD”. During this period, she was barred from attending official events of the far-right party that were open to the press, and party officials refused to grant her interviews. In 2017, in an interview with David Dufresne, Turchi explained that “the younger generation of the FN is much more intolerant of journalists than some of the older generation”. She added: “Mediapart was blacklisted by the FN, and the doors closed. No more access, no more interviews, no more on-the-record statements. I had to find another way of covering the party, its activists and its voters. In a sense, this ban pushed me towards a more investigative approach to covering the party”. Asked about media coverage of the movement, she said: “The National Front has always provoked heightened, passionate reactions, in one direction or the other. The most appropriate way to cover it is therefore to stick to the facts: analysis of its platforms, assessments of the cities it governs, the voting records of its elected representatives, investigations into its finances. Facts, facts, facts”.

==== Target of threats and intimidation ====
In January 2015, she received death threats from “a group of four or five people, including Axel Loustau”, an associate of Marine Le Pen. Oliver Duguet, treasurer of a micro-party supporting Le Pen called Jeanne, told her: “I’m going to kill you! I’m going to find you! I’ll wait for you outside of your home!” Asked about the incident at a press conference, the FN president said: “If Marine Turchi has a complaint to make against these people, she can file one”, adding that she still did not wish to “respond to Mediapart”. Turchi has said that every scoop she published about National Rally was followed by attempts to intimidate her. “Hundreds of malicious phone calls, abusive text messages, her home is isolated”, Marie Claire reported.

After being sued for defamation over an article written by Marine Turchi, Mediapart won its appeal against Axel Loustau in June 2018.

According to Mediapart, Marine Turchi “has been subjected to sustained legal harassment by the far right, received countless insults and threats (including by text message on her personal phone), and been physically intimidated on several occasions”.

==== Investigations into sexual violence (2017-) ====
In 2015, she contributed to the collective work Informer n’est pas un délit.

She has also investigated sexual violence, particularly the Tariq Ramadan and Luc Besson cases.

In 2017, she joined Mediapart’s investigative desk, where she worked with Lénaig Bredoux on sexual and gender-based violence.

Between 2008 and 2014, Turchi also taught at the Lille School of Journalism (ESJ) and the Centre for the Training and Professional Development of Journalists (CFPJ) in Paris.

In 2018, she decided not to publish an investigation into allegations of sexual violence involving filmmaker Claude Lanzmann following his death. She was shortlisted for the 82nd Albert Londres Prize for her reporting on sexual violence.

In 2026, after a seven-year investigation, she published accounts from alleged victims who accused French singer and actor Patrick Bruel of rape and sexual assault, leading to what became known as the Patrick Bruel sexual assault cases.

==== Marine est au courant de tout… ====
In 2017, she publsiehd her first book, Marine est au courant de tout..., with Mathias Destal, in which they shed light on National Front’s secret finances, funding and behind-the-scenes figures. In the 400-page book, the two journalists sought to understand why Marine Le Pen continued to keep party radicals within her inner circle and financial organization despite having ousted her father. Turchi said that the investigation she conducted with Destal took place in a “truly hostile overall climate”. The weekly magazine Marianne described the book as “a masterful study of behaviour that explores, at once, the historical, economic and psychological forces at work within the National Front clan”. According to Libération, “one of the book’s merits is that it traces in detail how a group of Marine Le Pen’s associates took control of the National Front’s finances”. In an interview with France Culture, Turchi explained that “money lies at the heart of National Front’s history and its family and political feuds”.

==== Adèle Haenel case ====
In an extensive investigation published by Mediapart on 3 November 2019, Marine Turchi reported on the “control” that film director Christophe Ruggia allegedly exerted over actress Adèle Haenel between 2001 and 2004, during and after the filming of Les Diables. Haenel accused Ruggia of inappropriate touching and sexual harassment when she was between the ages of 12 and 15. In addition to Haenel’s account, the investigation drew on around thirty witness accounts and two letters signed by Ruggia and addressed to the young actress, dated July 2006 and July 2007. In them, he referred to his “love for [her]” and lamented having to “continue living with this wound and this absence”.

== Publications ==
- collective work edited by Fabrice Arfi and Paul Moreira, Informer n'est pas un délit : Ensemble contre les nouvelles censures, Calmann-Lévy, 2015
- Destal, Mathias; Turchi, Marine (2017). Marine est au courant de tout…. Flammarion. p. 411.
- Turchi, Marine (2021). Faute de preuves. éditions du Seuil. p. 416. ISBN 9782021483567.

== Filmography ==
- Envoyé spécial. Front national : les hommes de l’ombre - 16 mars 2017 (France 2)

== See also ==
- Rally for France
- Luc Besson
- Adèle Haenel
- Patrick Bruel sexual assault cases
