= Alors regarde =

1990 single by Patrick Bruel

Single by Patrick Bruel

from the album Alors regarde
- B-side: "Rock, haine, rôles"
- Released: 1990
- Recorded: 1989
- Genre: Pop
- Length: 3:50 (single); 4:16 (album)
- Label: RCA
- Songwriter: Patrick Bruel
- Producers: Patrick Bruel, Mick Lanaro

Patrick Bruel singles chronology
"J'te l'dis quand même" (1990)	"Alors regarde" (1990)	"Place des grands hommes" (1991)

"Alors regarde" is a 1989 song recorded by French singer Patrick Bruel. Written by Bruel, it was the third single from his second studio album Alors regarde, on which it appears as the fourth track, and was released in September 1990. It was successful in France, becoming a top three hit and Bruel's one of the most famous songs.

== Chart performance ==
In France, "Alors regarde" debuted at number 37 on the chart edition of 29 September 1990, reached the top ten three weeks later, peaked at number three in its 11th week, and totalled 12 weeks in the top ten and 19 weeks in the top 50. On the European Hot 100, it started at number 73 on 20 October 1990, reached a peak of number 20 in its sixth week and totaled 15 weeks on the chart. Regularly played on radio, it debuted on the European Airplay Top 50 at number 47 on 20 October 1990, reached its hisghest position, number 17, four weeks later, and fell off the chart after 13 weeks of presence.

== Track listings ==
- CD maxi
1. "Alors regarde" (new mix) — 3:50
2. "Alors regarde" (instrumental) — 3:50
3. "Elle m'regardait comme ça" — 3:49
- 12" maxi - France, Germany
1. "Alors regarde" (new mix) — 3:50
2. "Alors regarde" (instrumental) — 3:50
3. "Rock, haine, rôles" — 6:03
- 7" single
1. "Alors regarde" (new mix) — 3:50
2. "Rock, haine, rôles" — 6:30
- CD single - Promo - Poland
1. "Alors regarde" — 4:16

== Charts ==
Chart (1990–1991)	Peak position
Europe (European Airplay Top 50)	16
Europe (Eurochart Hot 100)	20
France (SNEP)	3
Quebec (ADISQ)	14

== Release history ==
Country	Date	Format	Label
France	1990	CD maxi	RCA
France	1990	7" single	RCA
France	1990	12" maxi	RCA
Germany	1990	12" maxi	RCA
Poland	2002	Promotional CD single	Ariola
