= Flavie Flament =

French television and radio presenter

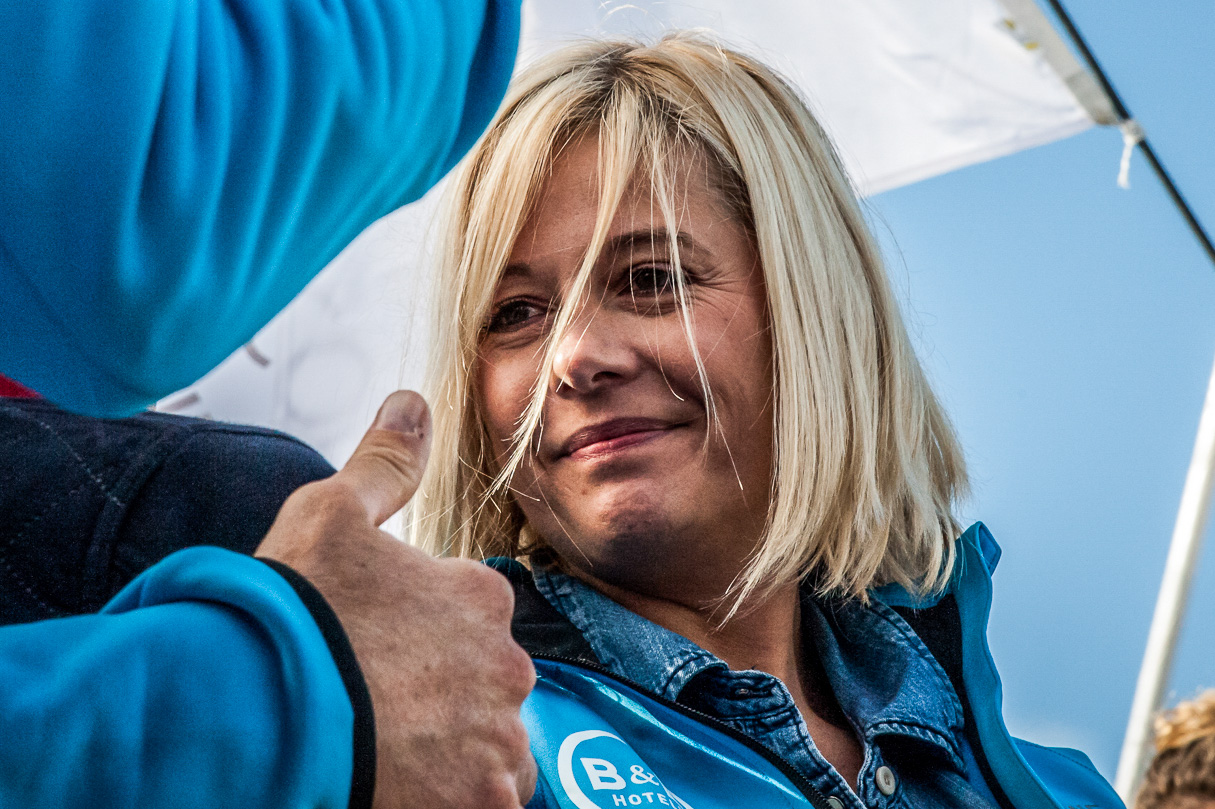
- Flament (2014)
- Born: Flavie Lecanu; 2 July 1974 (age 52); Valognes, France
- Occupation: Television presenter
- Notable credit(s): Exclusif; Stars à domicile Domino Day; Sagas; Vis ma Vie
- Spouse(s): Bernard Flament (m. 1993; div. ????) Benjamin Castaldi (m. 2002; div. 2006)
- Children: 2

Flavie Flament (née Lecanu, born 2 July 1974) is a French television and radio presenter.

== Early life ==
She was born in Valognes, Normandy, the daughter of Jean-Paul Lecanu, a former professional football player (1970–1974) for Stade Malherbe de Caen, who subsequently worked for the SNCF. Her mother worked for the state's children-protection agency, Aide sociale à l'enfance (ASE).

She has two older brothers, Olivier and Maxime.

In 1988, she was elected "Miss OK" in the show L'élection de Miss OK 88, broadcast on M6 and hosted by Marie-Pierre Lacq and Jean-Luc Delarue).

== TV career ==
Flament began her career as a production assistant for the TV show Frou-Frou hosted by Christine Bravo on Antenne 2. She then worked for Philippe Alfonsi's production Ça déméninge! on La Cinquième.

In 1998, she became weather presenter on Canal + and then worked on the shows Un autre journal with Philippe Gildas, Unisex, and Toutes les Télés on M6.

In 2000, Flament hosted on a daily basis Exclusif on TF1, alongside Frédéric Joly, and Stars à domicile. From 2001 to 2005, she was presenting the live event Domino Day on TF1 (alongside Denis Brogniart and Dave).

Flament has hosted events and special programs on TF1 including L'homme le plus drôle de l'année, Les 500 Choristes ensemble, Tube d'un jour, tube de toujours, Sagas, Vis ma Vie and La Chanson de l'année. She hosted the daily program named Leçon de style, broadcast on TF1. These programs were sponsored by C&A, who had appointed Flavie Flament their brand ambassador.

In 2009, Flament hosted Love and bluff on TF1.

== Personal life ==
She has a child, named Antoine (born 1995), from her first marriage to director Bernard Flament.

On 21 September 2002, she married TV host Benjamin Castaldi, with whom she has a child, Enzo, born in 2004. They have since divorced. Her current companion is the director Pierre Quatrefages.

Flament has posed in the nude for Gala magazine.

In 2016, she accused British photographer David Hamilton of raping her when she was 13 years old. France’s statute of limitations on rape and sexual abuse did not allow for Hamilton's prosecution. Some weeks after Flament's book containing the accusation was published, the photographer, at age 83, committed suicide. Following Hamilton's death, Laurence Rossignol, the French minister for children's and women's rights, asked Flament to lead a body that would consider extending the statute of limitations.

== Rape complaint against Patrick Bruel ==
On 13 May 2026, Flavie Flament filed a complaint against Patrick Bruel, alleging that he had raped her in 1991, when she was 16 years old. On 22 May, speaking on RTL, she provided further details about the alleged rape and its aftermath. She said that on 30 September 2006, during a live TF1 broadcast, while they were alone in a corridor, Bruel took her in his arms and whispered, “Do you remember?” She replied, “No, remember what?” He then said, “Of course we slept together.” According to Flament, this encounter and Bruel’s expression, which she perceived as that of a predator, helped her understand what she said had happened at his home fifteen years earlier. She said that on that occasion, he had offered her tea and that, when she woke up, he was putting her trousers back on her as though she were a doll.

The 2006 broadcast took place in connection with a Johnny Hallyday concert at Accor Arena, hosted by Benjamin Castaldi, Flament’s husband at the time. Bruel also appeared on stage to pay tribute to Hallyday. Following her allegations, Flament was subjected to widespread cyberbullying on social media by Bruel’s fans.

== Publications ==
- La consolation. Paris: JC Lattès, 2016. ISBN 978-2709646949.

== TV shows ==
- 1999: Toutes les Télés / M6
- 1999: Unisexe / M6
- 2000–2001: Exclusif / TF1, with Frédéric Joly
- 2001–2005: Domino Day / TF1, with Denis Brogniart and Dave
- 2002–2004: Stars à domicile / TF1
- 2002–2004: Tubes d'un jour, tubes de toujours / TF1
- 2003: Nice People / TF1, with Arthur
- 2003–2004: La soirée spéciale / TF1
- 2006–2007: Vis ma vie / TF1
- 2004–2007: Sagas / TF1
- 2004–2008: La chanson de l'année / TF1
- 2004–2009: Les disques d'or / TF1
- 2005–2007: Podium: l'émission des 40 ans de variétés / TF1
- 2005–2009: Les 500 choristes ensemble / TF1
- 2005–2006: L'homme le plus drôle de l'année / TF1
- 2005–2009: Médical détectives / TF6
- 2006: Balavoine, 20 ans déjà / TF1, with Jean-Pierre Foucault
- 2006: Les 40 couples stars qui font rêver les français / TF1, with Benjamin Castaldi
- 2008: Génération Cloclo / TF1
- 2008: Leçon de style / TF1
- 2009: Les disques d'or / TF1
- 2009: Love and Bluff / TF1
- 2010: Les Rois du casse / Jimmy
- 2010: L’Œil de Jimmy / Jimmy

== Radio ==
- 2010–2011: Tout le plaisir est pour nous / RTL
- Since 2011: On est fait pour s'entendre / RTL

== See also ==
- Benjamin Castaldi
- Patrick Bruel sexual assault cases
