= Lénaïg Bredoux =

French journalist (born 1980)

- Bredoux in 2023
- Born: 1980 (age 45–46)
- Citizenship: French
- Occupation: Journalist
- Employer(s): Mediapart; AFP (until 2021); L'Humanité (until 2007)

Lénaïg Bredoux (born 1980) is a French journalist. She is Mediapart’s editorial lead on gender issues and gender-based and sexual violence.

== Biography ==
Lénaïg Bredoux graduated from École supérieure de journalisme de Lille and later from Sciences Po Paris.

She began her career at L'Humanité before passing the entrance examination for AFP. Elle She was then posted to Frankfurt, Germany, as a correspondent, where she specialized in the automotive, chemical and pharmaceutical industries, as well as European Central Bank. In 2010, she joined Mediapart, where she initially covered Socialist Party before specializing in issues relating to sexism and sexual violence alongside her colleague Marine Turchi.

Her reporting on sexual violence has led The New York Review of Books and L'Express to compare her to Ronan Farrow.

In October 2020, for the first time in France, a news organization created the position of “gender editor”, with Mediapart appointing Lénaïg Bredoux to the role. Her responsibilities include ensuring women are appropriately represented in the publication’s editorial coverage. Bredoux sees the post-MeToo era as an opportunity to reconcile journalistic rigour with feminist advocacy.

In 2021, an investigation by the international journalism consortium Forbidden Stories revealed that Lénaïg Bredoux—along with Mediapart editor-in-chief Edwy Plenel—was among the many journalists targeted with Pegasus spyware, in her case allegedly on behalf of the Moroccan intelligence services. In 2015, she had written several articles about Abdellatif Hammouchi, director-general of Morocco’s General Directorate for Territorial Surveillance (DGST).

In October 2023, she became co-editorial director of Mediapart alongside Valentine Oberti, succeeding Carine Fouteau and Stéphane Alliès.

== Books ==
- Bredoux, Lénaïg; Magnaudeix, Mathieu (January 2012). Tunis connection. Seuil. p. 260.
- “Responsable éditoriale aux questions de genre”, dans Étienne Galliand (ed.), Inclusi(·f·v·e·s) : Le monde du livre et de l'écrit : quelles diversités?, Paris, Double ponctuation, 2022, 253 pp. (ISBN 978-2-490855-26-1)
- Collectif, work edited by Lénaïg Bredoux, Metoo, le combat continue, Seuil, October 2023, ISBN 978-2-02-154388-9
