= Frédéric Joly =

French television host and producer

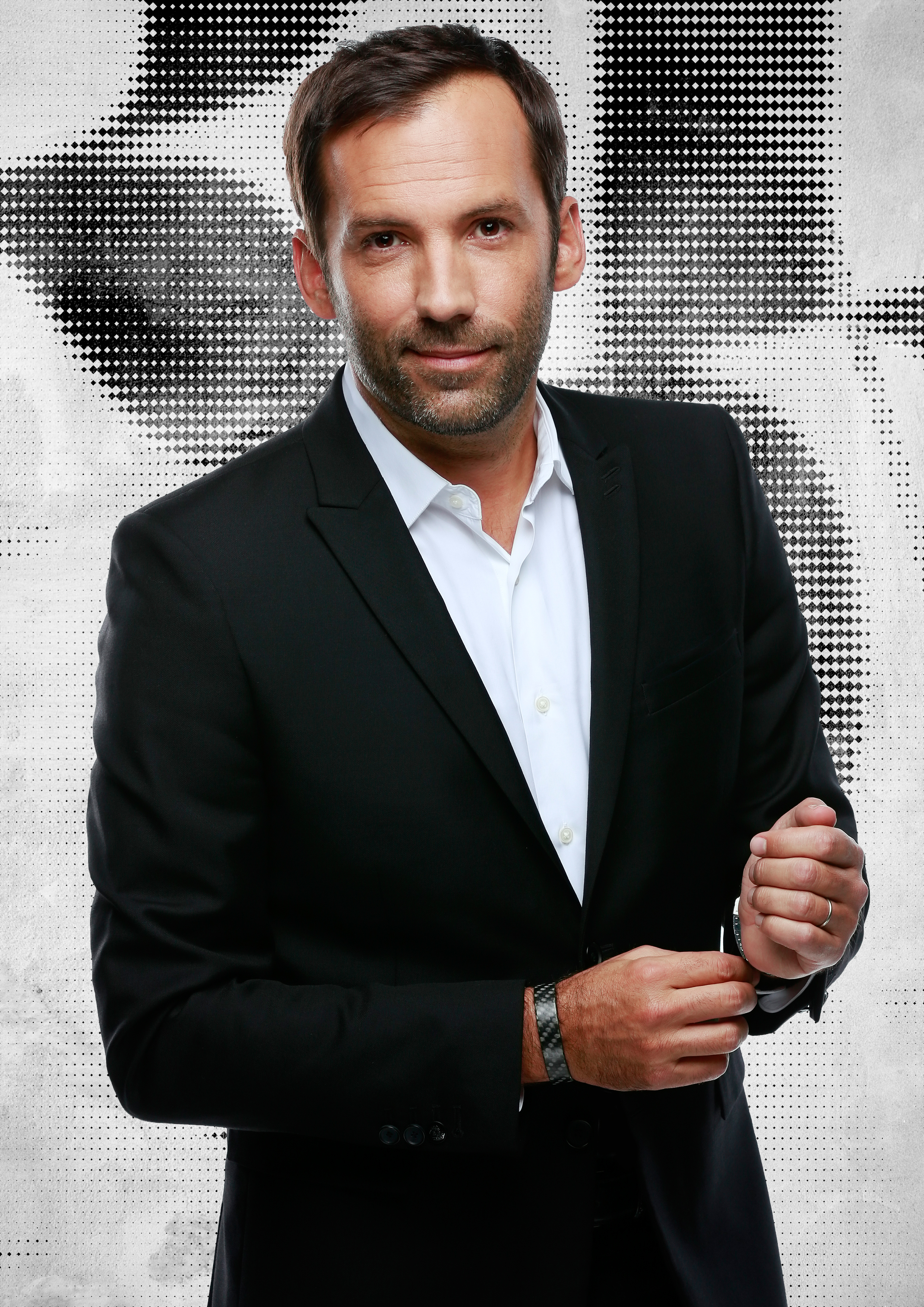

Frédéric Joly is a French television host and producer.

== Biography ==
He debuted his TV career in 1994, co-presenting the Disney Club. Fred was then his nickname, and he hosted alongside Julie, then Delphine. Then he moved to France 2 for a broadcast on the series, and presented his first prime-time during a special evening Urgences. During the summer, he hosted Fous d'humour.

Since 1998, he was back on TF1. He presents the daily show Exclusif with Emmanuelle Gaume and Flavie Flament. In December 2002, he joined TF6 to host the game Menteur, then France 2 for Trivial Pursuit. Finally in 2006, he moved to TPS Star to present Autour du blockbuster. He also presented Amnésia, les dossiers de la vie on NRJ 12.

He has his own production company.

In September 2003, he has been married with Alexandra. They have a son named Valentin, born on 9 August 2004.
