= Tempa Tsering =

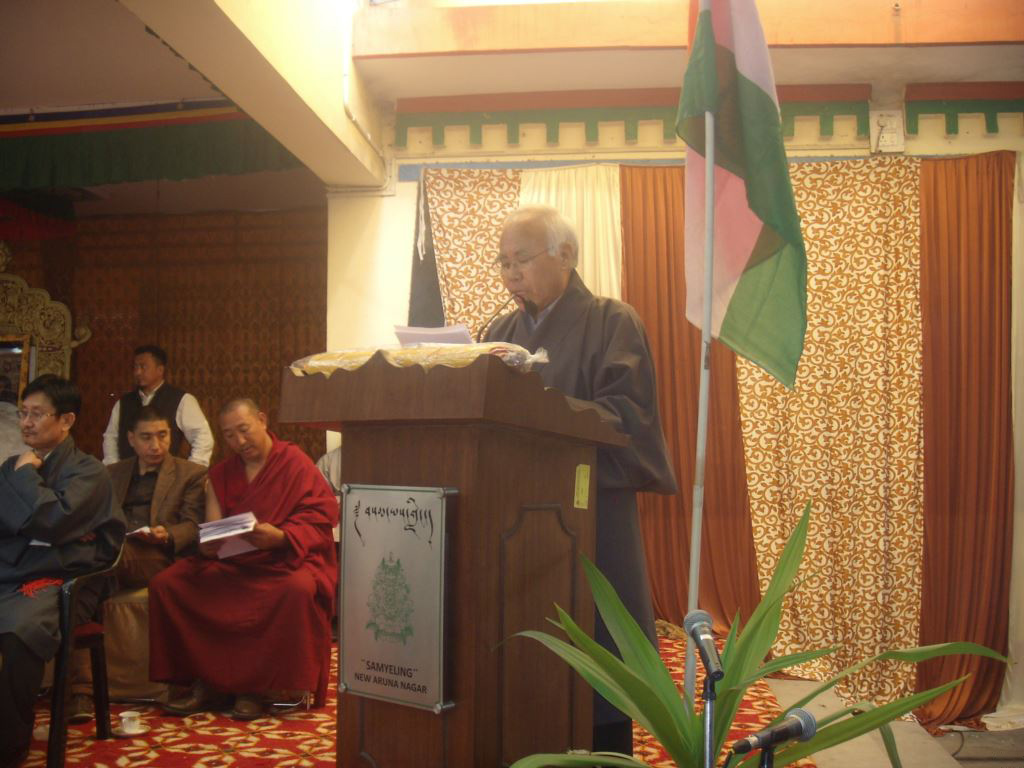
- Tempa Tsering, 2013
- Born: May 15, 1950 (age 75); Drumpa, Gyangtse, Tibet
- Education: B.Sc. Madras Christian College
- Alma mater: Dr. Grahams Homes, Kalimpong Madras Christian College
- Occupations: Director, India and East Asia for the Office of His Holiness the Dalai Lama.
- Title: Former Minister, Department of Home (2000-2001) Former Minister, Department of Information and International Relations (2006-2011) Former Representative of His Holiness the Dalai Lama in New Delhi (2005-2016)
- Spouse: Jetsun Pema
- Father: Chopel Dhondub

Tempa Risang (Tibetan: བསྟན་པ་ཚེ་རིང་, Wylie: Bstan-pa Tse-ring) is a former Tibetan political activist and Kalon (minister) at the Central Tibetan Administration, Dharamshala, India and was a representative of the 14th Dalai Lama in New Delhi, as well as a member of the Tibetan Government in Exile.

Currently, he serves as Director for India and East Asia at the Office of His Holiness the Dalai Lama, based in New Delhi, India.

== Early life and background ==
Tempa Tsering was born on May 15, 1959 in Drumpa, Gyantse, Tibet. Following the Chinese invasion of Tibet in 1950, he and his family fled to India seeking exile.

He received his secondary education at Dr. Graham's Homes in Kalimpong, and later earned a B.Sc. degree from Madras Christian College in Madras (Chennai), India.

== Governmental career ==
He was elected as the member of the Central Executive Committee of the Tibetan Youth Congress and its advisor.

In 1973, he joined the Tibetan civil service as interpreter and office secretary at the Bylakuppe Tibetan Settlement; from 1973 to 1974 as lower division clerk; between 1974 and 1980 as deputy secretary at the Department of Information and International Relations of the Government of Tibet in Exile; between 1981 and 1985 as deputy secretary (and later as additional secretary) at the Office of the 14th Dalai Lama; from 1988 to 1990 as additional secretary at the Department of Home; as chief coordinator at the Chief Representative’s Office for the five settlements in the state of Karnataka; from 1991 to 1999 as the secretary of the Department of Information and International Relations.

== Political career ==
In 2000, the Tibetan Parliament in Exile, from a list of nominees proposed by the Dalai Lama, elected him as minister (Standard Tibetan: Kalon). He held the portfolio of Kalon for the Department of Home, until the term of the 11th Cabinet (Tibetan: Kashag) expired in 2001. In 2006, he was nominated as Kalon by Samdhong Rinpoche and later approved by the Members of Assembly and taken the portfolio of Kalon for the Department of Information and International Relations along with the representative of the Dalai Lama in New Delhi. In 2016 he retired.
