= Assisted witness =

Legal term in French and Quebec law

In French and Quebec law, an assisted witness (French: témoin assisté) is a possible designation of a person who is suspected of a crime but has not yet been formally charged.

== See also ==
- Material witness
- Suspect
- Person of interest
