= Mac Lesggy =

French television presenter and producer

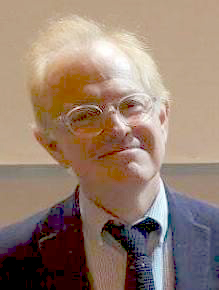
- Lesggy in 2015
- Born: Olivier Lesgourgues; 1 August 1962 (age 64); Bayonne, Pyrénées-Atlantiques, France
- Occupations: Television presenter, television producer
- Years active: 1984–present
- Known for: E=M6

Olivier Lesgourgues (1 August 1962), better known as Mac Lesggy is a French television presenter and producer.

== Biography ==
Mac Lesggy was born Olivier Lesgourgues in Bayonne, Pyrénées-Atlantiques. He spent his childhood in Biarritz and obtained his baccalaureate there in 1979. He later graduated from the Institut national agronomique Paris-Grignon in 1984. He began his professional career studying statistics and marketing.

== Career ==
In 1990, he did a professional training in television jobs. He established at the same time a project for a scientific television program accepted by the channel M6. To produce it, he founded the society VM Productions that later became VM Group. Since February 1991, he has hosted the scientific television program E=M6.

Since the early 2000s he has hosted a number of television programs such as Le grand test, Le grand quizz and QI, a television IQ test. He passed a casting test to host the program Êtes-vous plus fort qu'un élève de 10 ans ? with Laurent Boyer and Stéphane Rotenberg.

He has appeared in some advertisements such as M6 Mobile and Oral-B. He has also appeared in the video game E=M6 Défi Cérébral, a training game inspired by his scientific television program.

He is also member of the jury of the program Ma maison est la plus originale, broadcast in autumn 2011 and since February 2013.

In May 2012, he participated at the eighth step of Pékin Express, le passager mystère as the mystery passenger.

== Personal life ==
Mac Lesggy is married and has three children, two daughters and one son. He is well known for his eccentric glasses designed by Alain Mikli.

== Honours ==
In 1995, Mac Lesggy received the "Grand Prix de l'Information Scientifique" from the French Academy of Sciences.

E=M6 received a prize at the Festival Images et Sciences de Palaiseau in 1992, as well as the 7 d'Or for "Best educative program" in 2001.
