= Hacking of consumer electronics =

Customization of devices beyond what is normally possible

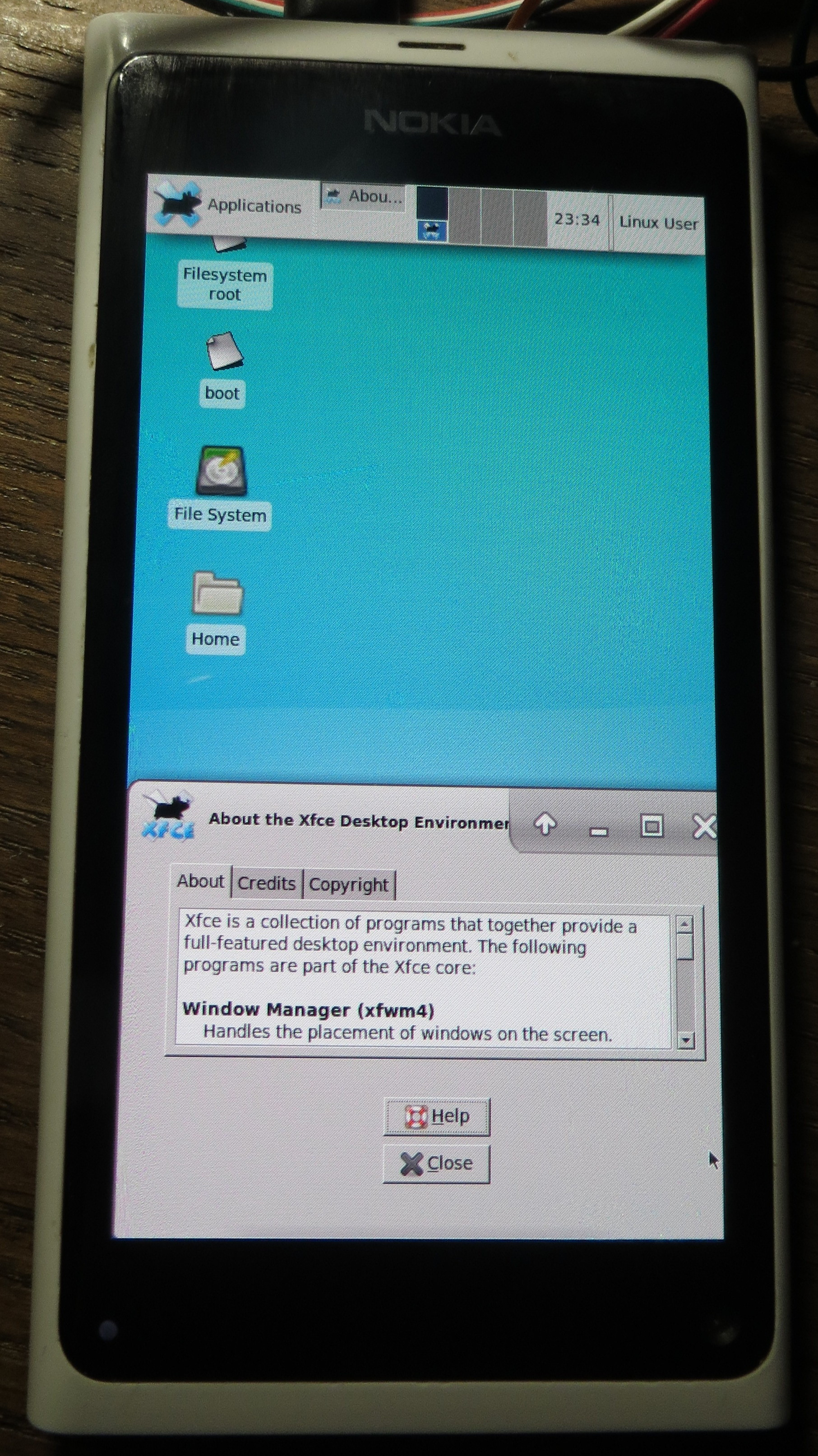
Hardware hacking has allowed this Nokia N9 smartphone to run with Xfce, a desktop interface on postmarketOS, an alternative operating system.

The hacking of consumer electronics is a common practice that users perform to customize and modify their devices beyond what is typically possible. This activity has a long history, dating from the days of early computer, programming, and electronics hobbyists.

- A notable case of the hacking of consumer electronics is jailbreaking of iOS devices or the rooting of Android phones, although many other electronics such as video game consoles are regularly hacked. While these methods allow unrestricted modification of an existing operating system installation, some third-party operating systems have been developed as a replacement to a device's default OS, such as Replicant and postmarketOS on cellphones, or DD-WRT and tomato on routers.

The process of consumer electronics hacking is usually accomplished through modification of the system software, either an operating system or firmware, but hardware modifications are not uncommon.

The legality of hacking consumer electronics has been challenged over the years, with an example of this being the cracking of encryption keys used in High-bandwidth Digital Content Protection, where detractors have been threatened under the basis of legal action. However, some companies have encouraged hardware hacking, such as Google's Nexus and Pixel series of smartphones.

== Overview ==
Many modern consumer electronics run either an operating system or firmware. When this is stored in a mutable storage device, these files can be modified to add functionality to the operating system, or to replace it entirely.

== Method ==
Multiple methods are used in order to successfully hack the target device, such as gaining shell access, gathering information about the device hardware and software, before using the obtained information to manipulate the operating system.

=== Shell access ===
Getting access to a shell allows the user to run commands to interact with the operating system. Typically, a root shell is aimed for, which grants administrative privileges, to let the user modify operating system files.

Root access can be obtained through the use of software exploits (i.e. bugs), through the bootloader console, or over a serial port embedded in the device, such as a JTAG or UART interface.

In the case of gaining root privileges on an Android device, the process is known as rooting.

=== Unlocking the bootloader ===
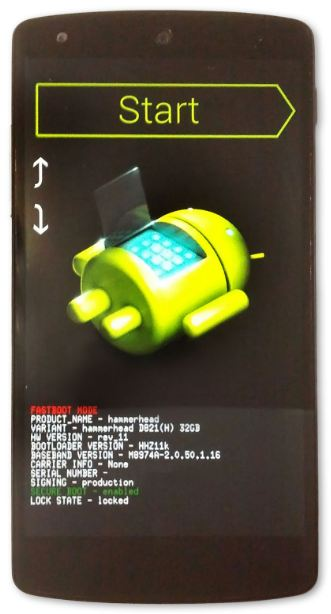
A smartphone showing a bootloader screen

On some Android devices, the bootloader is locked for security to prevent installation of other operating systems. Unlocking it is required before another OS can be installed.

On Android devices, Fastboot (Odin mode on Samsung devices) allows flashing of operating systems onto storage.

Das U-Boot is a bootloader commonly used in embedded devices such as routers and Chromebooks.

=== Getting information ===
Getting information on the device's hardware and software is vital because exploits can be identified, which is subsequently used to either gain shell access, port an operating system to the device, etc.

== Manufacturer use of open source software ==
A lot of device manufacturers include open source software in their products. When the software used is licensed under a copyleft license, a manufacturer is obliged to provide the source code of the open source components. An instance of this was when Naomi Wu requested the GPLv2 licensed source code of the Linux Kernel branch of a smartphone vendor.

A good share of consumer devices run on a modified Linux kernel, which is forked before applying device-specific changes. Android is an example of OS which makes use of the Linux kernel.

== Countermeasures ==
Device manufacturers often include countermeasures to hinder hardware hacking, one of which is the use of cryptography to prevent unauthorized code from being executed. For example, Nvidia graphics cards have signed firmware to prevent tampering or hacking.

== Devices ==
=== Smartphones ===
==== Hardware device removal ====
Whistleblower Edward Snowden showed Wired correspondent Shane Smith how to remove the cameras and microphones from a smartphone.

==== Modifying default operating systems ====
One of the reasons hacking is done is to add or unlock features in an operating system.

Examples include:

- Windows Phone
- Apple iOS (jailbreaking)
- Google Android (rooting)
- Palm webOS (developer mode)
- Symbian OS (executing unsigned code)
- Jio phone (Enabling WhatsApp hack to be installed)

==== Installing a third-party operating system ====
Another reason hacking is done is to allow unsupported operating systems to be installed.

- Replicant
- postmarketOS
- Firefox OS (defunct)

=== General purpose computers ===
A general purpose computer has historically been open by design.

However, Apple's Apple silicon based Mac hardware is based on the ARM architecture family, making it difficult to install a third-party operating system.

- Asahi Linux allows a Linux-based operating system to be installed on Apple silicon-based Macs.

=== Multimedia devices and video game systems ===
There are many reasons video game consoles may be hacked.

Game consoles are often restricted in a way that may disallow unofficial games to be run on it (see Video game console § Licensing), and hacking is undertaken to allow unlicensed games to run on it, including pirated games.

Another reason is to allow features to be added, such as using the console as a multimedia player. An example of this is Xbox Media Player, which was made to allow pictures and movies to be shown on an Xbox.

- Microsoft
  - Xbox
  - Xbox 360
  - Xbox One
  - Xbox Series X/S
- Nintendo
  - GameCube
  - Game Boy Advance
  - Nintendo DS
  - Nintendo 3DS (Homebrew)
  - Wii
    - Wii homebrew
  - Wii U
  - Nintendo Switch
- Sony
  - PlayStation Portable
  - PlayStation 2
  - PlayStation 3
  - PlayStation Vita
- Others
  - TiVo
  - DVD player - to remove regional restrictions, user operation prohibition flag (fast forward disabled in advertising clip etc.) and Macrovision (video copy is flashing after copying to protect analog hole)
  - Blu-ray players - to remove regional restrictions
  - Any non-smart mobile phone to remove operator lock or SIM lock restriction.

=== Other devices ===
- Scientific calculators
- Graphing calculators
  - Texas Instruments signing key controversy
- Video cards
- Routers
  - DD-WRT
  - OpenWrt
- Oscilloscopes
- Thermographic cameras
- GPS devices
- Canon digital cameras
- Nikon digital cameras

== Devices allowing for hacking ==
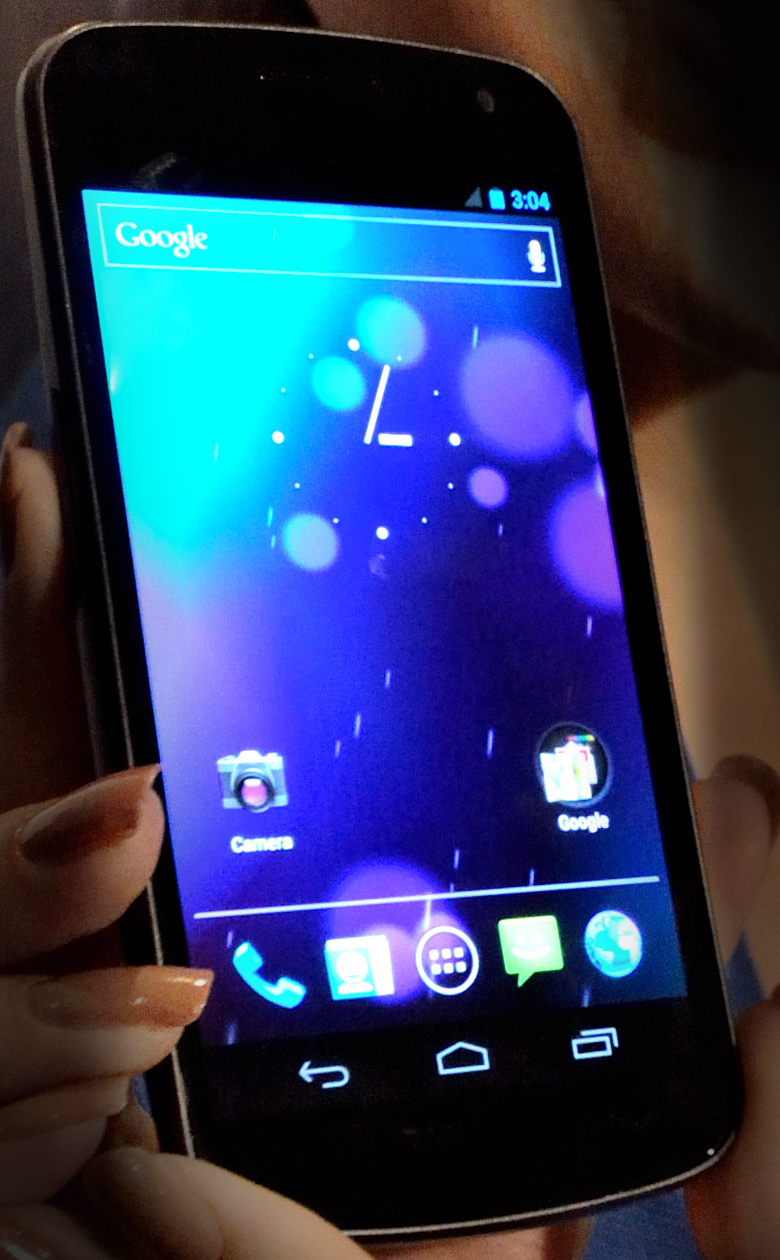
Phones like the Galaxy Nexus, part of the Google Nexus series, are designed to allow root access and easy modification of the system

Some devices—most commonly open source—are built for homebrew purposes, and encourage hacking as an integral part of their existence.

- Pandora (computer)
- Chumby
- Ouya
- Nokia N900
- Android Dev Phone
  - Nexus One
  - Nexus S
  - Galaxy Nexus, previously one of the phones recommended by the Android Open Source Project for software development
- ZTE Open
- Many wireless routers' firmware upgrade functions are not limited to accepting updates that have been signed by the device's manufacturer. As a result, open-source firmware replacements have been created for many devices, such as OpenWrt and DD-WRT.

== Legality ==
iOS jailbreaking was often considered illegal in the United States until a 2010 ruling by the U.S. Copyright Office declaring that jailbreaking an iPhone or other mobile device would no longer violate copyright law. However, simultaneously, there is ongoing prosecution against hackers of videogame consoles under anti-circumvention violations of the DMCA. A main complication, in many cases, is the profiting from selling jailbroken or rooted equipment as a value-added service. At least some accused deny these charges and claim only to be making back-ups of legally purchased games.

In around 2010, the High-bandwidth Digital Content Protection encryption system, which encrypts data running between cable boxes, Blu-ray players, and other similar devices and displays was cracked, and a copy of the master key needed to decrypt HDCP protected streams was posted on the internet. Intel, which created and now licenses HDCP technology, has stated that HDCP is sufficient to keep most users from circumventing it, but indicated that it may threaten legal action against more determined users under the DMCA.

Also in around 2010, on the issue of the hacking of its then new interactive game controller the Kinect, Microsoft initially condemned and threatened legal action against those who hacked it, but soon after, it reversed this position and instead stated that it had intentionally left the device open, and would in fact not prosecute those who modified it.

== See also ==
- Easter egg (media)
- iOS jailbreaking
- List of open-source hardware projects
- Right to repair
- Rooting (Android)
- Symbian OS Security bypass
- Privilege escalation
- Unsigned code
