= Xbox Media Player =

Open source media player for Xbox

Xbox Media Player (or XBMP for short), now obsolete, was the predecessor to XBMC and XBMC4Xbox, a feature-rich free and open source media player for the Xbox (console). With an audio/video-player-core based on MPlayer, it allowed owners of a modified Xbox to display pictures and movie files, as well as play music files from the Xbox DVD-ROM drive, built-in harddisk drive, LAN (SMB) or the Internet.

- Kodi (formerly XBMC) which is the successor of XBMP is still actively being developed and maintained as a cross-platform application that actually runs on the newer Xbox One and Xbox Series X/S, but is no longer backwards-compatible with the original Xbox game console.

== History ==
The Xbox Media Player Project was founded by d7o3g4q (also known as duo) and RUNTiME. It started out as two separate players, with the two developers each working on their own design and code. After sharing code and coordinating features to not duplicate efforts, by XBoxMediaPlayer beta 5 the two players were merged. The development and beta-testing was done "behind closed doors" for this project (d7o3g4q and RUNTiME promising that when version 1.0 was made they would release the source code to the public). After beta 6 was completed there were complaints from a lot of people as to why the developers did not release the source code for the player sooner as they were using FFmpeg and XVID code which are under the (L)GPL license. Even though the project was closed d7o3g4q and RUNTiME released the source code for beta 6 on the October 15, 2002.

In the November 2002, another software developer nicknamed Frodo who was the founder of "YAMP - Yet Another Media Player" joined the Xbox Media Player team and the XBoxMediaPlayer and YAMP projects were merged, the first release of the merged projects was called "Xbox Media Player 2.0" and the source code for it was released on December 14, 2002. XBoxMediaPlayer 2.0 was a complete re-write using a new core based on the MPlayer project, still using FFmpeg/XVID codec code. On December 28, 2002, the source code of XBoxMediaPlayer 2.1 was released with many bug fixes and a couple of new features such as true AC3 5.1 output, volume normalizer/amplification and an additional post processing filter. Two weeks later on January 12, 2003, XBoxMediaPlayer 2.2 source code was released with new features including dashboard mode to launch other Xbox applications/games, separate national language files, streaming media from windows file shares (SMB), audio-playlist, the ability to play media on-the-fly from ISO9660-Mode1 CDs and Windows DLL support for WMV 7,8, and 9. Xbox Media Player development stopped on December 13, 2003.

== Running XBMP ==
XBMP requires a modchip or software exploit/hack installed in/on the Xbox to run, as it is not an authorized (a.k.a. "signed") Microsoft product. XBMP can be run as an application, or a dashboard that appears directly when the Xbox is turned on (though it takes around 15 seconds to load fully).

== Legality ==
Although XBMP is licensed under the GNU General Public License (GPL), it is written for use with Microsoft's XDK and so is not legally available as an executable program to non-official Microsoft game-publishers. Users are encouraged to compile their own binaries from the public CVS repository using the XDK, rather than downloading a questionable illegally released executable. XBMP's full source code is however legal 'as is' and is available on SourceForge.

== See also ==
- XBMC4XBox, a third-party developer spin-off project of XBMC for Xbox, with still active development and support of the Xbox.
- Kodi (formerly XBMC), the original cross-platform XBMC Media Center project, the successor of XBMP, which however now does no longer run on the old Xbox.
- Xbox, Microsoft's first generation video game console, originally released in 2001.
