= Woven (disambiguation) =

Woven may refer to:

- Woven fabric is textile formed by weaving
- Woven by Toyota is a mobility technology subsidiary of Toyota Motor Corporation
- Woven coverlet is a type of bed covering
- Woven is an experimental rock band from LA
