= Jean-Baptiste Kempf =

French computer engineer (born 1983)

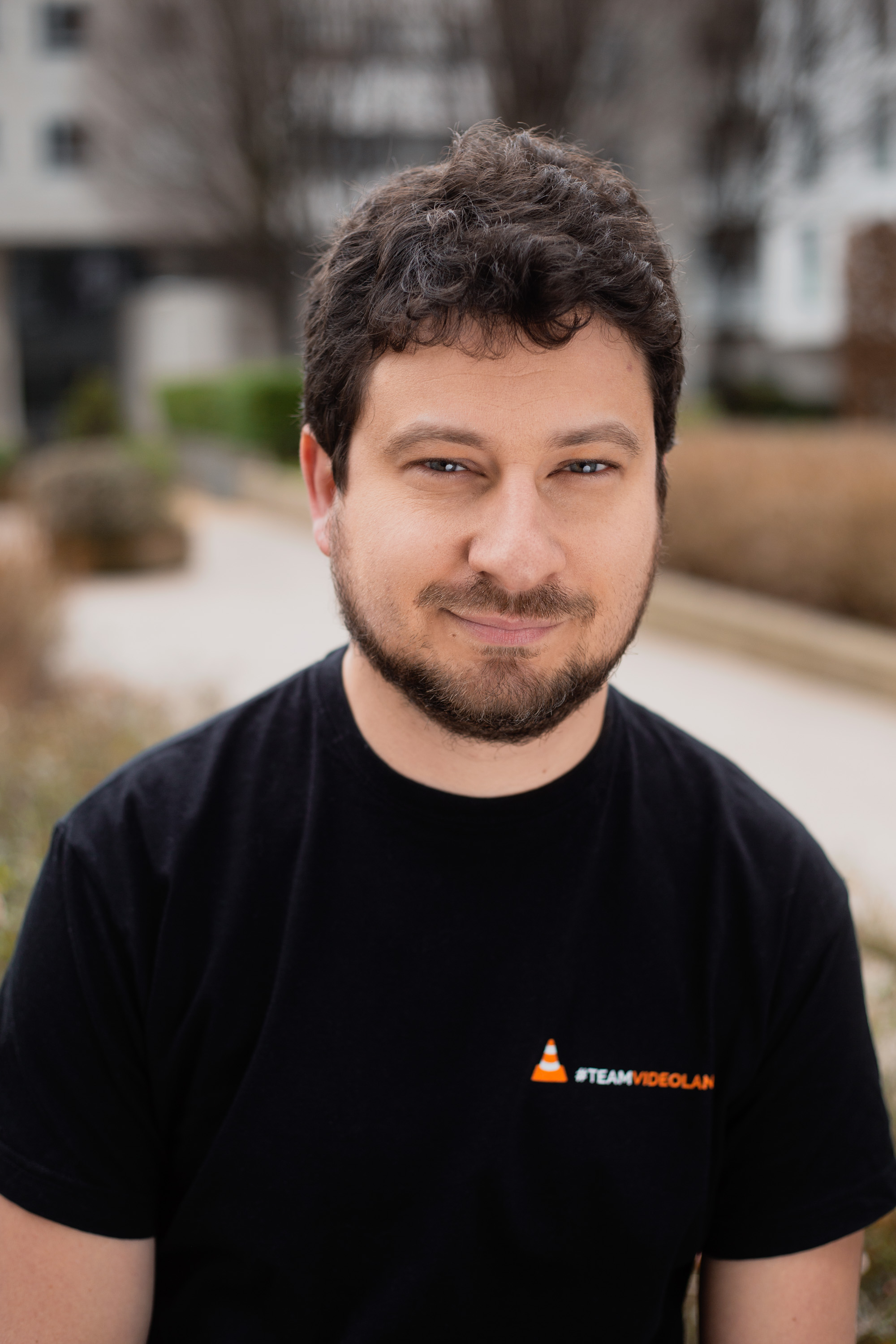
- Kempf in 2021
- Born: March 30, 1983 (age 43); France
- Education: Paris-Sud University
- Occupation: Technical director
- Years active: September 2020-
- Employer: Shadow (service)
- Known for: VideoLAN Project
- Notable work: VLC media player
- Website: https://jbkempf.com/

Jean-Baptiste Kempf (born March 30, 1983) is a French computer engineer and entrepreneur. He is a major contributor to the VideoLAN project and VLC software.

== Career ==
Kempf joined École Centrale Paris in 2003 and quickly became involved with VLC. In 2004, it surpassed one million downloads. By 2006, when the project had lost momentum, Kempf took a leadership role, restructuring the team and cleaning up the codebase.

In 2008, Kempf founded the VideoLAN organization to separate VLC from the university. He worked in San Francisco briefly for the French consulate but returned to France disillusioned. Inspired by Silicon Valley, he adopted its methods to advance VLC, which reached over 100 million users globally by 2009. As of 2019, Kempf was President of VideoLAN.

In 2012, Kempf founded Videolabs, a for-profit tech startup that develops services and tools around VLC and video in general. This structure allowed him to decline acquisition offers, some of which have reached several million euros. As of 2017, Videolabs sustained both Kempf and the VLC project financially.

Kempf has also led the development of other projects, including VLC 3, featuring support for 360° video, and Vizr, a video identification tool similar to Shazam, which detects films or series being played on a screen and provides additional information.

== Honors ==
- In 2018, Kempf received the Chevalier de l'ordre national du Mérite for twelve years service to associations and IT development.
- On 7 November 2025, Jean-Baptiste Kempf received the European SFS Award.
