= VideoLAN =

Non-profit organization developing software

- Formation: April 21, 2009; 17 years ago
- Founder: Jean-Baptiste Kempf
- Founded at: Paris, France
- Type: Non-profit organization
- Legal status: Association loi de 1901
- Purpose: Software development and promotion of free software for multimedia
- Headquarters: 18, rue Charcot, 75013, Paris, France
- Coordinates: 48.8312°N 2.3716°E
- Region served: Worldwide
- Services: Software development
- Official languages: English, French
- President: Jean-Baptiste Kempf
- Affiliations: Videolabs
- Volunteers: List of volunteers
- Website: www.videolan.org

Common logo for all VideoLAN projects

VideoLAN is a non-profit organization which develops software for playing video and other media formats. It originally developed two programs for media streaming, VideoLAN Client (VLC) and VideoLAN Server (VLS), but most of the features of VLS have been incorporated into VLC, with the result renamed VLC media player.

The VideoLAN project began as a student endeavor at École Centrale Paris in France, but after the software was released under the free and open source GNU General Public License, the project is now multinational with a development team spanning 40 nations. The project has been completely separated from École Centrale Paris since 2009 when it was constituted as a non-profit organization.

The current president of the VideoLAN non-profit organization is Jean-Baptiste Kempf, who is also one of the project's developers.

== Projects ==
=== VLC ===
VLC (standing for VideoLAN Client) is a portable multimedia player, encoder, and streamer supporting many audio and video codecs and file formats as well as DVDs, VCDs, and various streaming protocols. It is able to stream over networks and to transcode multimedia files and save them into various formats. It is one of the most platform-independent players available, with versions for Microsoft Windows, Mac OS X, iOS, Android, Windows Phone, Linux, BeOS, BSD, Solaris, ChromeOS, and is widely used with over 4.2 billion downloads as of October 2022.

=== VLMC ===
VLMC (standing for VideoLAN Movie Creator) is a cross-platform, non-linear, video editing software application based on the VLC Media Player. The software is still in early development. The latest version is 0.2.0 (released 2014-10-30), released under the GPLv2 license.

=== VLS ===
The VLS (standing for VideoLAN Server) project was originally intended to be used as a server for streaming videos. It has since been merged with the VLC project, and use of VLS is not encouraged.

=== Codecs ===
The VideoLAN project also hosts several audio/video decoding and decryption libraries, such as libdvdcss which allows the content of CSS protected DVDs to be unscrambled, x264 which can encode H.264/MPEG-4 AVC video, x265 which can encode HEVC video, x262 which can encode MPEG-2 video, dav1d which can decode AV1 video, dav2d which can decode AV2 video, libdca which can decode DTS audio, and the git repository of the multimedia framework FFmpeg.

=== VLMa ===
A new project has been developed, called VLMa (standing for VideoLAN Manager). VLMa is an application to manage broadcasts of TV channels, received through digital terrestrial or satellite ways. Its interface is provided as a web-site written in Java. It is also capable of streaming audio and video files. VLMa consists of a daemon (called VLMad) and a web interface (called VLMaw). VLMa is released under the GNU General Public License like VLC media player.

=== VLC media player Skin Editor ===
The VLC Skin Editor is a simple program developed by VideoLAN. The simple interface allows users to create new skins for the VLC media player without knowledge of the VLC Skins2 XML System. The program lets users change features on the main window, playlist window, and equalizer window.

== Commercial use ==
In May 2008, Neuros Technology and Texas Instruments began work on a port of VideoLAN to their next generation open set-top box.

VLC is currently used in products through the use of libVLC and also as raw or customized VLC for Android versions on devices. Some features have been publicly merged, such as 360° support.

== Opposition to software-bundling ==
VideoLAN developers have expressed dismay at how users searching for their products see search advertising from websites that use unwanted software bundling to modify official download files with wrappers that include unwanted programs. VideoLAN does not have the resources to sue the many companies abusing their trademarks.

== See also ==
- Google Video – used VideoLAN technology in its media player web browser plugin.
- Comparison of audio player software
- Comparison of video player software
- List of video editing software
