= Libdca =

libdca
- Original author: Gildas Bazin
- Developer: VideoLAN project
- Stable release: 0.0.6 / May 15, 2018
- Written in: C
- Operating system: Cross-platform
- Type: Library
- License: GNU General Public Licence
- Website: www.videolan.org/developers/libdca.html

libdca (formerly libdts) is a free library for decoding DTS Coherent Acoustics streams. It is released under the terms of the GNU General Public License, and is developed by Gildas Bazin of the VideoLAN team. The library is based on the DTS Coherent Acoustics standard (ETSI 102 114 v1.2.1).

The library used in the VLC media player can decode DTS audio tracks from DVDs. It can also directly decode DTS files (.dts) and DTS-WAV files (.wav). libdca can also decode DTS-ES streams; however, it can only decode the standard 6 channels, as the additional "Extended Surround" extensions (for Matrix and 6.1 Discrete) require ES Extensions to the codec.

libdca comes packaged with a small proof of concept decoder, dcadec (formerly dtsdec). This program can decode DTS audio streams into stereo WAV or a single multichannel WAV, which can be played back through the sound card.

The development of libdca was frozen mostly by 2007 (version 0.0.5). The 2018 update (version 0.0.6) only includes changes to the build system. An unrelated program and library from 2016, also known as dcadec, provides some extra functions, including support for the ES and HD extensions, the 96/24 format, and Master Audio streams. It has since displaced libdca in providing DCA/DTS support as an integral part of ffmpeg.

== See also ==
- Digital Theater System
- VLC media player
