= Libmpeg2 =

Free and open source software library for decoding MPEG-1 and MPEG-2 video data

libmpeg2 is a free and open source software library for decoding MPEG-1 and MPEG-2 video streams. libmpeg2 is released under the terms of the GNU GPL license.

== Legality and software patents ==
Since the libmpeg2 source code library is released under free and open source license it is legally redistributable. However, the MPEG-2 compression algorithm method is owned by the MPEG Licensing Authority and are in some countries protected by software patents. Absent such a licence from the MPEG Licensing Authority, it could possibly be illegal in certain countries to distribute compiled versions of libmpeg2 for the purpose of decoding MPEG-1 and/or MPEG-2 video streams. In February 2018, all MPEG-2 patents have expired for any country except Malaysia and the Philippines.
