= Xbox (console) =

Home video game console

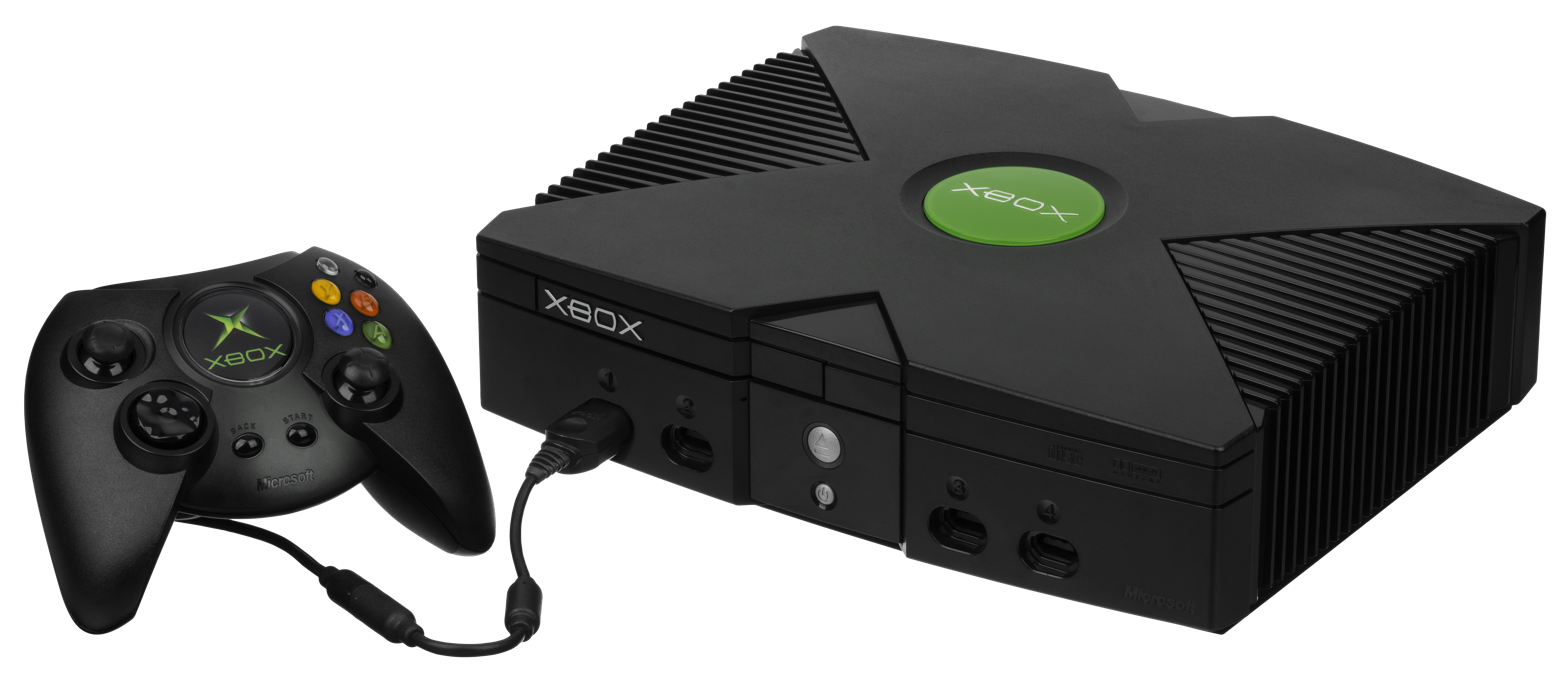
- Xbox console with the "Duke" controller
- Developer: Microsoft
- Manufacturer: Flextronics, Wistron
- Product family: Xbox
- Type: Home video game console
- Generation: Sixth
- Released: NA: November 15, 2001; JP: February 22, 2002; PAL: March 14, 2002
- Introductory price: US$299 (equivalent to $540 in 2025); £299 (equivalent to £550 in 2025); €479 (equivalent to €740 in 2023)
- Discontinued: JP: 2005; WW: 2006
- Units sold: 24 million
- Media: DVD, CD, digital distribution
- Operating system: Windows NT-based Xbox system software
- CPU: Intel Pentium III @ 733 MHz
- Memory: 64 MB DDR SDRAM
- Storage: 8 GB internal hard drive
- Removable storage: 8 MB memory cards
- Display: 480i, 480p, 576i, 576p, 720p, 1080i
- Graphics: Nvidia NV2A @ 233 MHz
- Controller input: 4 × Xbox controller ports (proprietary USB interface)
- Connectivity: 100 Mbit/s Ethernet
- Online services: Xbox Live
- Best-selling game: Halo 2 (8.46 million) (list)
- Successor: Xbox 360

The Xbox (often referred to as the Original Xbox to differentiate it from its successors) is a home video game console developed and marketed by Microsoft. It was released on November 15, 2001, in North America, followed by Australia, Europe, and Japan in 2002. It was the first major American-produced console since the Atari Jaguar in 1993, and as a sixth-generation console, competed with Sony's PlayStation 2 and Nintendo's GameCube.

Microsoft began developing the Xbox in response to the impending launch of the PlayStation 2, which Microsoft CEO Bill Gates saw as threatening the Windows PC business due to its support for CD-ROM and DVD playback. Whereas most previous game consoles used specially designed hardware, the Xbox was built around standard PC components. Its hardware includes an Intel Pentium III CPU and an Nvidia GeForce 3-based GPU, while the software uses variations of Windows 2000 and DirectX. The Xbox was the first console to feature a built-in hard disk. The Xbox supports broadband connectivity to the internet via an integrated Ethernet port; Microsoft launched Xbox Live, a fee-based online gaming service, in 2002.

The Xbox had a record-breaking launch in North America; aided by the popularity of the launch game Halo: Combat Evolved, Microsoft sold 1.5 million Xboxes before the end of 2001. Cumulative sales reached 24 million, including 16 million in North America. However, Microsoft lost over $4 billion on the Xbox, unable to make a steady profit due to the manufacturing price being far more expensive than its retail price. The Xbox outsold the GameCube and Sega's Dreamcast, but was vastly outsold by the PlayStation 2. It underperformed outside of the Western market; particularly, it sold poorly in Japan due to its large size and an overabundance of games marketed towards American audiences.

Microsoft discontinued the Xbox in 2006, and closed its online services in 2010. The Xbox was the first in the Xbox line of consoles, followed by the Xbox 360 in 2005, the Xbox One in 2013, and the Xbox Series X/S in 2020. All subsequent Xbox consoles are backward compatible with select original Xbox games. The popularity of the Xbox's blockbuster games, such as Halo 2 (2004), contributed to the popularity of first-person shooters and online console gaming.

== History ==
=== Creation and development ===
Before the Xbox, Microsoft had found success publishing video games for its Windows PCs, releasing popular titles such as Microsoft Flight Simulator and the massively successful Age of Empires after the creation of DirectX, the application programming interface (API) that allowed for direct access of the computer hardware and bypassing Windows. However, the company had not entered the home console market of video games, which was dominated at the time by Sony's PlayStation. Sony was working on its next video game console, the PlayStation 2 (PS2), announced officially to the public on March 2, 1999, and intended for the system to act as a gateway for all types of home entertainment. Sony presented a vision where the console would ultimately replace the desktop computer in the home. Microsoft CEO Bill Gates saw the upcoming PS2 as a threat to Microsoft's line of Windows PCs, worrying that the all-encompassing system could eliminate consumer interests in PCs and drive them out of the market. With video games rapidly growing into a massive industry, Gates decided that Microsoft needed to venture into the console gaming market to compete with Sony. Previously, Sega had developed a version of Windows CE for its Dreamcast console to be used by game developers. Additionally, Gates had directly approached Sony CEO Nobuyuki Idei before the public announcement of the PS2 regarding letting Microsoft develop programming software for the console. However, the offer was declined by Idei in favor of having Sony create proprietary software. Microsoft had also attempted to meet with Hiroshi Yamauchi and Genyo Takeda of Nintendo to potentially acquire the company, but Nintendo declined to go further.

In 1998, four engineers from Microsoft's DirectX team—Kevin Bachus, Seamus Blackley, Ted Hase and DirectX team leader Otto Berkes—began discussing ideas for a new console which would run off Microsoft's DirectX technology. Nat Brown, the Windows Software Architect at Microsoft, would also become a regular contributor to the project after meeting Hase in November 1998. The project was codenamed "Midway," in reference to the Battle of Midway during World War II in which Japan was decisively defeated by American forces, as a representation of Microsoft's desire to surpass Sony in the console market. The DirectX team held their first development meeting on March 30, 1999, in which they discussed issues such as getting a PC to boot at a quicker pace than usual. The console would run off Windows 2000 using DirectX 8.1, which would allow PC developers to easily transition into making games for the console while also granting it a larger processing power than that of most other home consoles. According to Blackley, using PC technology as the foundation for a video game console would eliminate the technological barriers of most home consoles, allowing game creators to expand further on their own creativity without having to worry about hardware limitations.

The 4 DirectX team members encountered disagreements with the Silicon Valley engineering team behind WebTV, which joined Microsoft after they purchased the rights to the device. Microsoft executive Craig Mundie wanted the project to be led by the WebTV team, who believed the console should be built from the ground-up as an appliance running off Windows CE; however, the DirectX team were adamant about the idea of repurposing PC hardware components, such as the X86 architecture, off-the-shelf GPUs, and a hard disk drive, arguing that they were cheaply manufactured and could easily be updated every year. The 4 developers gained the support of Ed Fries, the head of Microsoft's gaming division, who believed the use of a hard drive, in particular, would give the console a technical edge among competitors despite its high manufacturing cost. The two opposing teams pitched their arguments to Gates on May 5, 1999, at a meeting attended by over twenty different people. WebTV's team, among whom were Nick Baker, Dave Riola, Steve Perlman, and Tim Bucher, and their sponsor, Craig Mundie, made the case that creating an appliance would be far cheaper, highlighting that most consoles were generally sold at around $300. They also wanted to use a custom-made graphics chip, which could be shared across several different home devices. Conversely, Fries, vouching for the DirectX team, argued that using a PC hard drive would set Microsoft's console apart from competitors by allowing for the direct implementation of online access, an argument which Gates sided with. When Gates questioned if PC games could be effectively ported to the new console, Blackley explained that the machine would utilize DirectX hardware, meaning that they could be converted easily. Gates heavily favored this proposition over WebTV's, whose concept relied on Windows CE, a heavily stripped-down Windows variant that was not compatible with DirectX. As such, Gates sided with the DirectX concept and gave Berkes' team permission to create a new video game console. Despite this, WebTV would still play a part in the Xbox's initial launch.

Rick Thompson and Robert J. Bach were responsible for overseeing the Xbox's design. The DirectX team began constructing prototype consoles, purchasing several Dell computers and using their internal parts. Initially, it envisioned that after designing the console, Microsoft would have worked with a third-party computer manufacturer to mass-produce the units. However, the early work showed that this would need to be something that Microsoft would have to produce themselves, making the prospect a far more costly operation; the name "Coffin Box" became associated with the project as there were fears the project would end careers at Microsoft. Further, as a gaming console, they could not provide the direct Windows interface to users. While Thompson and Bach had warned Gates and Steve Ballmer about these large-scale changes from the initial proposal in late 1999, the matter came to a head at a February 14, 2000, meeting, informally referred to as the Valentine's Day Massacre, in which Gates furiously vented about the new cost proposal and massive changes in this console from what had been previously presented, since the Xbox appeared to marginalize Windows. However, after being reminded that this was a product to compete against Sony, Gates and Ballmer gave the project the go-ahead along with the necessary marketing budget. Another contentious point of design was the addition of Ethernet connectivity rather than simple support for dial-up networking. At this point, most consumer homes had access to Internet connectivity, but social networks had yet to be established which would later demonstrate the viability of this decision. The Xbox leads argued that with the planned Xbox Live functionality, the Ethernet port would help friends be able to play after they have graduated from schools and colleges and moved across the country.

Throughout the console's prototyping, Microsoft was working with AMD for the CPU on the system. According to Blackley, just prior to the system's reveal in January 2001, the Microsoft engineers opted to switch to an Intel CPU, a fact that had not yet been communicated to AMD prior to the reveal.

Among the names considered for the new console were a number of acronyms, including "Windows Entertainment Project" (WEP), "Microsoft Total Gaming" (MTG), "Microsoft Interactive Network Device" (MIND), and "Microsoft Interactive Center" (MIC). Also among the names considered was "DirectX Box", referring to the system's reliance on Direct X. At one point, Hase jokingly came up with the names "XXX-Box" and "DirectXXX-Box" as a nod to the system's higher volume of adult content compared to Sony or Nintendo's consoles. "DirectX Box" was quickly shortened to "Xbox" through an e-mail conversation, and was ultimately favored by the development team, though a number of spelling variants were tossed around, such as xBox, XboX, and X-box. Microsoft's marketing department did not like this name, suggesting "11-X" or "Eleven-X" as alternatives. During focus testing, the company put the name "Xbox" on the list of possible names simply to prove how unpopular the Xbox name would be with consumers. However, "Xbox" proved to be the more popular name on the list and was thus selected as the official name of the product.

When the physical design of the controller began, circuit boards for the controller had already been manufactured. Microsoft had asked Sony's supplier, Mitsumi Electric, for a similar folded and stacked circuit board design used in Sony's DualShock 2 controller, but the company refused to manufacture such a design for Microsoft. This led to the controller being bulky and nearly three times the size of Sony's controller. This initial controller design was never launched in Japan. The console instead launched with a smaller, redesigned version named "Controller S" that did use the more compact circuit board design.

As the development team began to tighten down the design of the Xbox, they got help from Flextronics not only in revising the design but in mass production, creating a factory in Guadalajara, Mexico, for this purpose. Early production units had a high failure rate of around 25%, which Flextronics repaired. Later iterations of the hardware design worked to eliminate these failures.

=== Initial announcement and content acquisitions ===
Gates first publicly mentioned the Xbox in an interview in late 1999, stating that he wanted the system "to be the platform of choice for the best and most creative game developers in the world". It was later announced officially by Gates in a keynote presentation at the Game Developers Conference in San Jose on March 10, 2000, showing off an early prototype build of the system and a series of demos showcasing its hardware. The presentation and the new system were well-received, impressing developers with both the hard drive and the Ethernet port and appealing to them with the notion of easy-to-use development tools.

Microsoft began looking at a series of acquisitions and partnerships to secure content for the console at this time. In early 2000, Sega's Dreamcast sales were diminishing, in part due to Electronic Arts' decision to bypass the console, and Sony's PlayStation 2 was just going on sale in Japan. Gates was in talks with Sega's late chairman Isao Okawa about the possibility of Xbox compatibility with Dreamcast games, but negotiations fell apart over whether the Dreamcast's SegaNet online service should be implemented. Microsoft also looked to acquire Electronic Arts, Nintendo, Square Enix, and Midway without success. The company did achieve success in convincing developers at Bethesda Game Studios and Tecmo about the power of the Xbox over the PS2, lining up The Elder Scrolls III: Morrowind and Dead or Alive 3 as Xbox console-exclusives.

Around this same time, Microsoft announced it was rebranding its Games Group, which had been focused on developing games for Windows, to the Microsoft Games division to make titles for both Windows and the Xbox. Microsoft began acquiring a number of studios to add to the division, notably Bungie in June 2000, shortly after their announcement of Halo: Combat Evolved. With Microsoft's acquisition, Halo switched from being a release for personal computers to being an Xbox exclusive release and as a launch time to help drive sales of the console.

=== Formal announcement and release ===
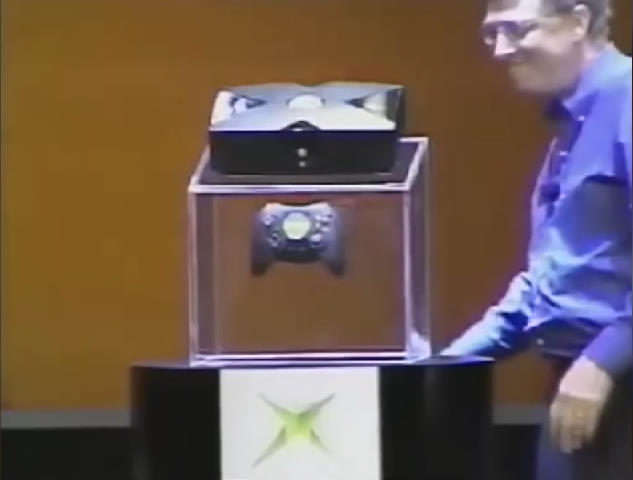
Gates unveiling Xbox

The Xbox was officially unveiled to the public by Gates and guest professional wrestler Dwayne "The Rock" Johnson at CES 2001 in Las Vegas on January 3, 2001. Microsoft announced Xbox's release dates and prices at E3 2001 in May. Most Xbox launch titles were unveiled at E3, most notably Halo and Dead or Alive 3.

The unit's release in November 2001 was partially hampered by the impact of the September 11 attacks on travel, as Microsoft could not travel to the Guadalajara facility to help test units. They were able to arrange to ship the units locally instead of testing at Microsoft facilities to have them ready for launch.

The system was officially launched at midnight on November 15, 2001, three days before the subsequent launch of the Nintendo GameCube. A special event was held on the prior night as part of the grand opening of the flagship store of Toys 'R' Us at Times Square in New York City, in which 1,000 systems were shipped to the store to kick off sales. Bill Gates was present at the event, personally selling the first Xbox console and greeting people in line and playing games with them at the numerous display units present.

=== Promotion ===
In 2002, the Independent Television Commission (ITC) banned a television advertisement for the Xbox in the United Kingdom after complaints that it was "offensive, shocking and in bad taste." It depicted a mother giving birth to a baby boy, fired like a projectile through a window, aging rapidly as he flies through the air. The advertisement ends with an old man crash-landing into his own grave and the slogan, "Life is short. Play more."

=== Discontinuation and successors ===
The Xbox's successor, the Xbox 360, was officially announced on May 12, 2005, on MTV. It was the first next generation system to be announced. It was released in North America on November 22, 2005. Nvidia ceased production of the Xbox's GPU in August 2005, which marked the end of brand-new Xbox production. The last game for the Xbox in Japan was The King of Fighters Neowave released in March 2006, the last Xbox game in Europe was Xiaolin Showdown released in June 2007, and the last game in North America was Madden NFL 09 released in August 2008. In February 2008, Halo 2 was re-released in the Platinum Hits edition for the original Xbox. The new edition featured updated packaging with the collection’s visual identity and promotional labels such as “Best Selling Xbox Game Ever”. The disc also received a new print with the Platinum Hits logo. The new box art was initially published on a press website of Microsoft, confirming the launch of the edition. This was the final release in the Platinum Hits line for the original Xbox. Support for out-of-warranty Xbox consoles was discontinued on March 2, 2009. Support for Xbox Live on the console ended on April 15, 2010.

The Xbox 360 supports a limited number of the Xbox's game library if the player has an official Xbox 360 Hard Drive. Xbox games were added up until November 2007. Xbox game saves cannot be transferred to Xbox 360, and the ability to play Xbox games through Xbox LIVE has been discontinued since April 15, 2010. It is still possible to play Xbox games with System Link functionality online via both the original console and the Xbox 360 with tunneling software such as XLink Kai. It was announced at E3 2017 that the Xbox One would be gaining support for a limited number of the Xbox's game library.

== Hardware ==
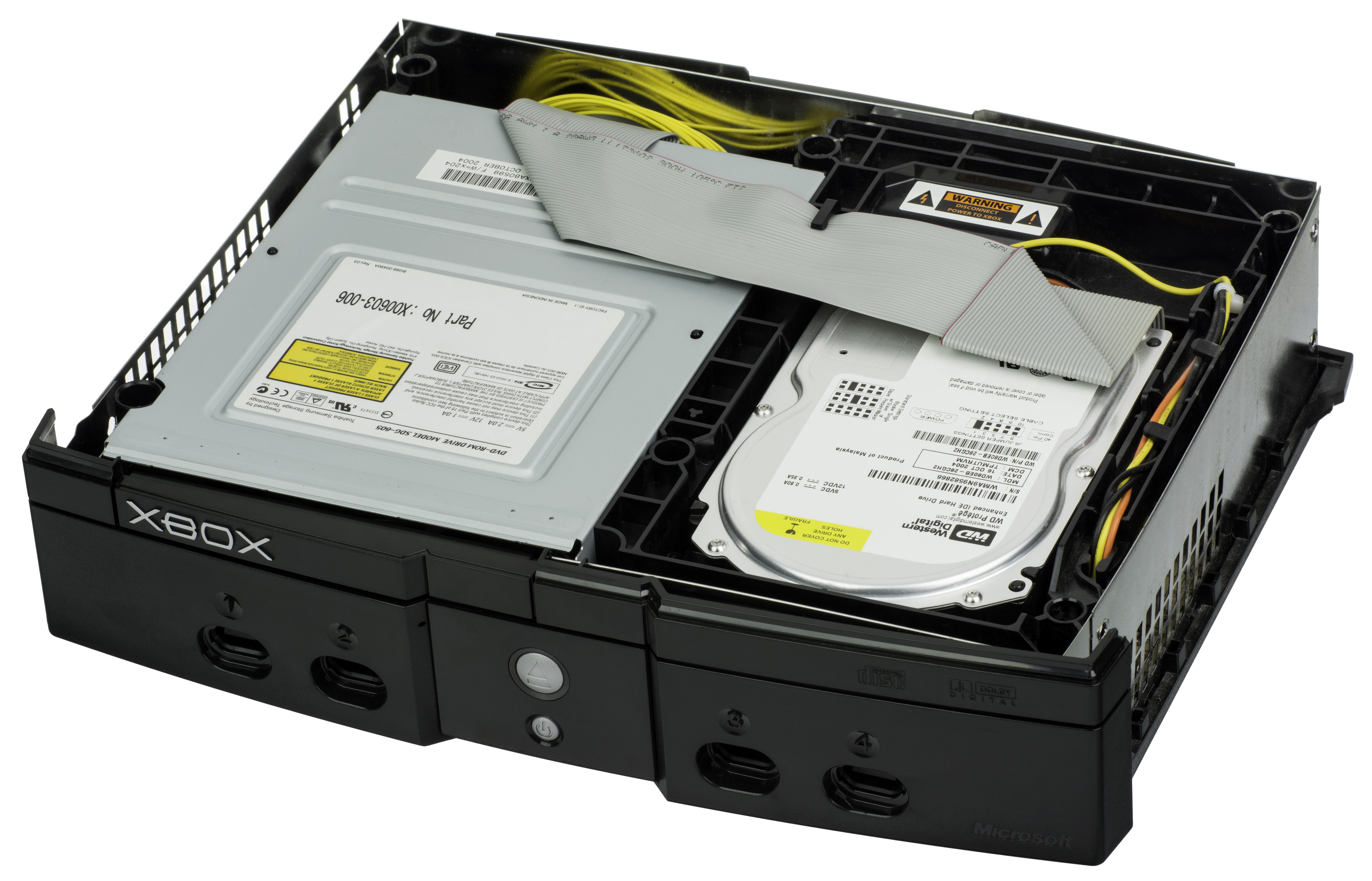
The use of standard desktop components such as a DVD-ROM and hard drive contributed to much of the console's weight and bulk.

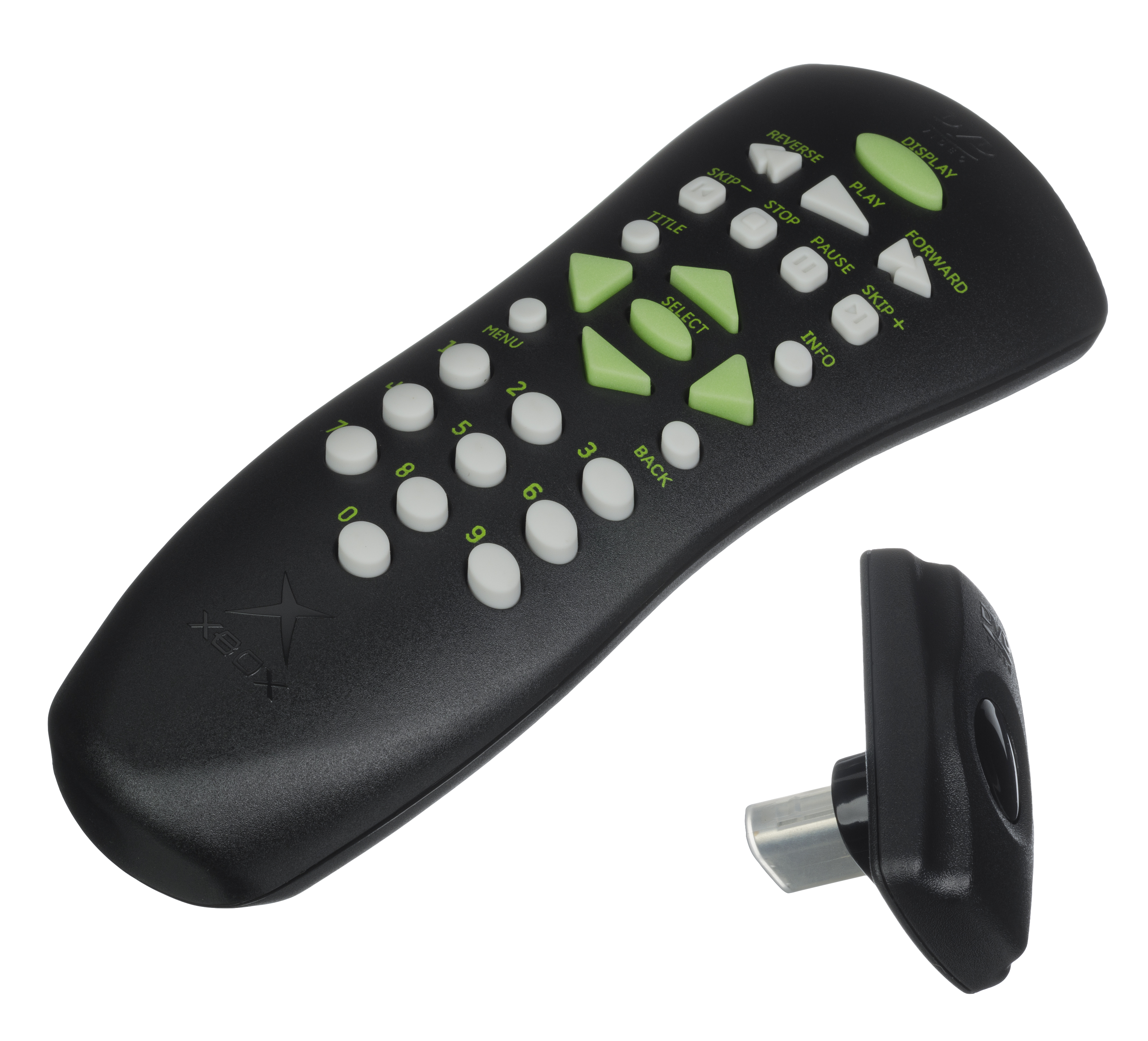
A remote was required for DVD movie playback on the Xbox, which was sold separately.

The Xbox was the first video game console to feature a built-in hard disk drive, used primarily for storing game saves and content downloaded from Xbox Live. This eliminated the need for separate memory cards (although some older consoles, such as the Amiga CD32, used internal flash memory, and others, such as the TurboGrafx-CD, Sega CD, and Sega Saturn, had featured built-in battery backup memory prior to 2001). An Xbox user could rip music from standard audio CDs to the hard drive, and these songs were used for the custom soundtracks in some games.

Unlike the PlayStation 2, which could play movie DVDs without the need for a remote control (although an optional remote was available), the Xbox required an external IR adapter to be plugged into a controller port in order to play movie DVDs. If DVD playback is attempted without the IR sensor plugged in, an error screen will pop up informing the user of the need for the Xbox DVD Playback Kit. The said kit included the IR sensor and a remote control (unlike the PS2, the Xbox controller could not control DVD playback). Said remote was manufactured by Thomson (which also manufactured optical drives for the console) and went on sale in late 2002, which meant a modified version of the remote design used by the RCA, GE and ProScan consumer electronics of the era was used for the Xbox remote, and therefore users wishing to use a universal remote were instructed to utilize RCA DVD remote codes.

The Xbox was the first console to feature Dolby Interactive Content-Encoding Technology, which enables real-time Dolby Digital encoding. Previous game consoles could only use Dolby Digital 5.1 during non-interactive "cut scene" playback.

The Xbox is based on commodity PC hardware and is much larger and heavier than its contemporaries. This is largely due to a bulky tray-loading DVD-ROM drive and the standard-size 3.5-inch hard drive. The Xbox has also pioneered safety features, such as breakaway cables for the controllers to prevent the console from being pulled from the surface upon which it rests.

Several internal hardware revisions have been made in an ongoing battle to discourage modding (hackers continually updated modchip designs in an attempt to defeat them), to cut manufacturing costs, and to make the DVD-ROM drive more reliable (some of the early units' drives gave disc-reading errors due to the unreliable Thomson DVD-ROM drives used). Later-generation units that used the Thomson TGM-600 DVD-ROM drives and the Philips VAD6011 DVD-ROM drives were still vulnerable to failure that, respectively, either rendered the consoles unable to read newer discs or caused them to halt the console with an error code usually indicating a PIO/DMA identification failure. These units were not covered under the extended warranty.

In 2002, Microsoft and Nvidia entered arbitration over a dispute on the pricing of Nvidia's chips for the Xbox. Nvidia's filing with the SEC indicated that Microsoft was seeking a $13 million discount on shipments for NVIDIA's fiscal year 2002. Microsoft alleged violations of the agreement the two companies entered, sought reduced chipset pricing, and sought to ensure that Nvidia fulfill Microsoft's chipset orders without limits on quantity. The matter was privately settled on February 6, 2003.

The Xbox includes a standard AV cable which provides composite video and monaural or stereo audio to TVs equipped with RCA inputs. European Xboxes also included an RCA jack to SCART converter block and the standard AV cable.

An 8 MB removable solid-state memory card can be plugged into the controllers, onto which game saves can either be copied from the hard drive when in the Xbox dashboard's memory manager or saved during a game. Most Xbox game saves can be copied to the memory unit and moved to another console, but some Xbox saves are digitally signed. It is also possible to save an Xbox Live account on a memory unit, to simplify its use on more than one Xbox. The ports at the top of the controllers could also be used for other accessories, primarily headsets for voice chat via Xbox Live.

=== Technical specifications ===
The Xbox CPU is a 32-bit 733 MHz, custom Intel Pentium III Coppermine-based processor. It has a 133 MHz 64-bit GTL+ front-side bus (FSB) with a 1.06 GB/s bandwidth. The system has 64 MB unified DDR SDRAM, with a 6.4 GB/s bandwidth, of which 1.06 GB/s is used by the CPU and 5.34 GB/s is shared by the rest of the system.

Its GPU is Nvidia's 233 MHz NV2A. It is capable of geometry calculations for up to a theoretical 115 million vertices/second. It has a peak fillrate of 932 megapixels/second, capable of rendering a theoretical 29 million 32-pixel triangles/second. With bandwidth limitations, it has a realistic fillrate of 250–700 megapixels/second, with Z-buffering, fogging, alpha blending, and texture mapping, giving it a real-world performance of 7.8–21 million 32-pixel triangles/second.

=== Controllers ===
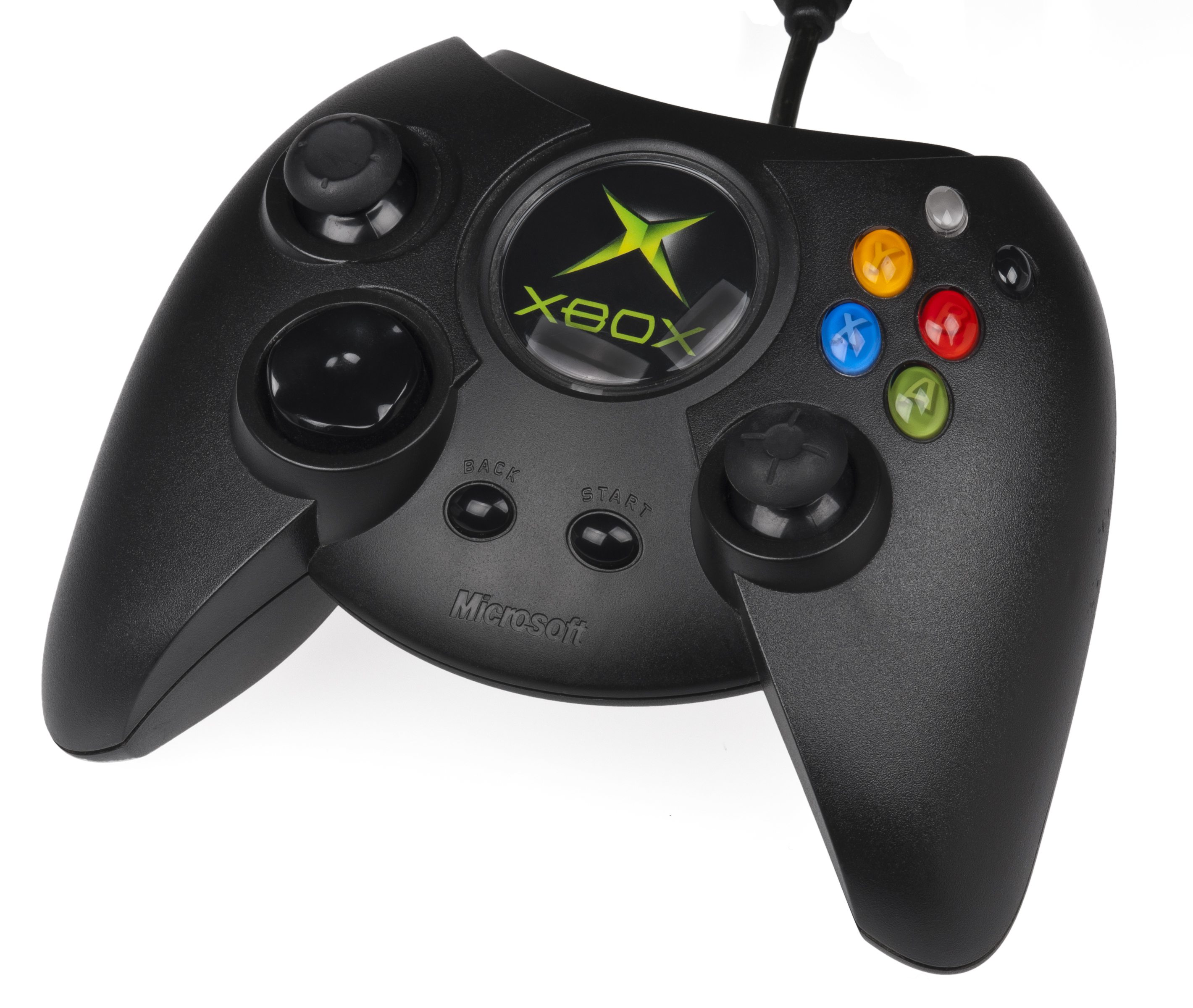
Original "Duke" controller

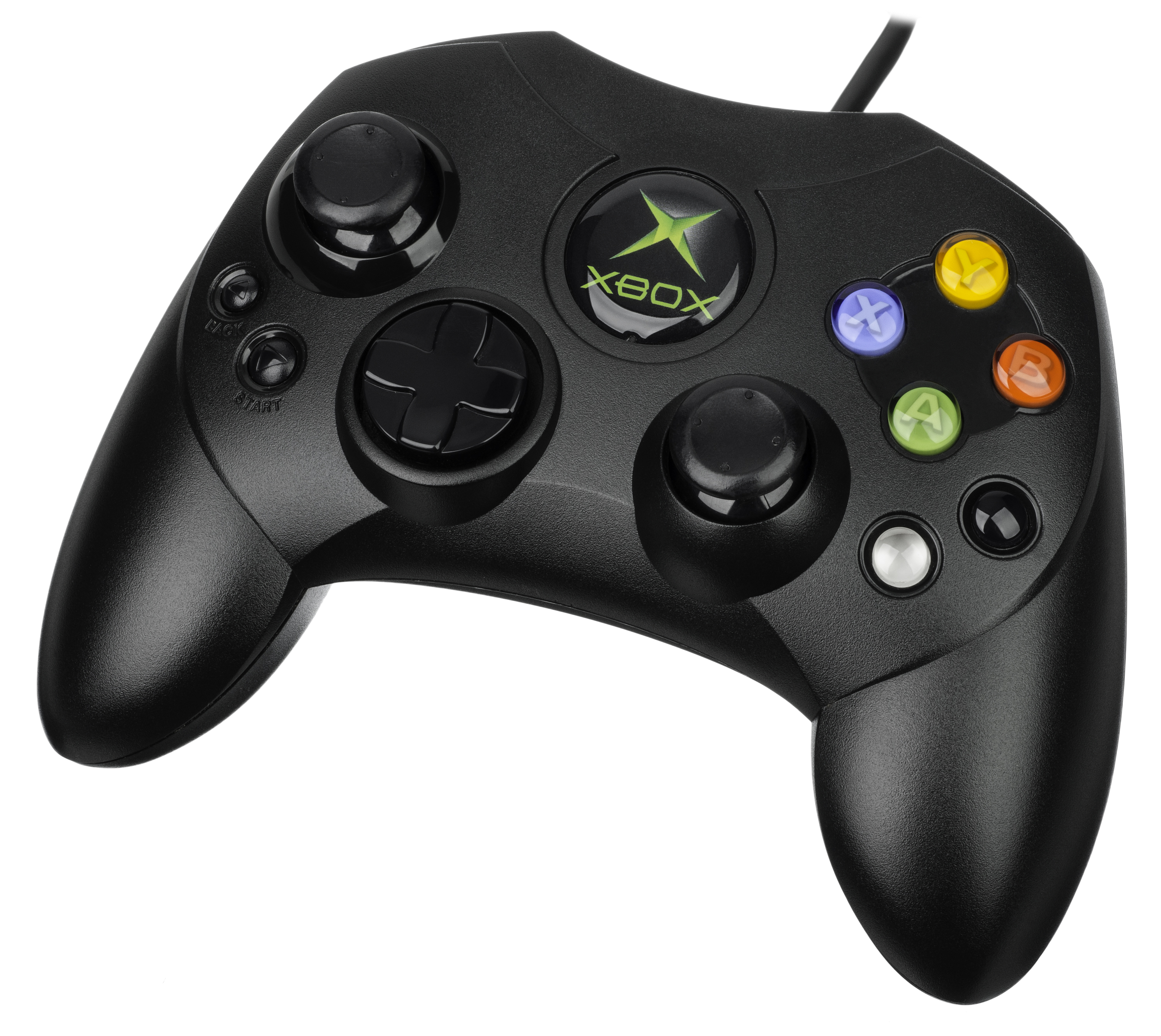
Redesigned "Controller S"

The Xbox controller features two analog sticks, a digital directional pad, two analog triggers, a Back button, a Start button, two accessory slots and six 8-bit analog action buttons (A/Green, B/Red, X/Blue, Y/Yellow, and Black and White buttons). The standard Xbox controller (also nicknamed the "Fatty" and later, the "Duke") was originally the controller bundled with Xbox systems for all territories except Japan. The controller has been criticized for being bulky compared to other video game controllers; it was awarded "Blunder of the Year" by Game Informer in 2001, a Guinness World Record for the biggest controller in Guinness World Records Gamer's Edition 2008, and was ranked the second-worst video game controller ever (behind the Atari Jaguar controller) by IGN editor Craig Harris.

The "Controller S" (codenamed "Akebono"), a smaller, lighter Xbox controller, was originally the standard Xbox controller only in Japan, designed for users with smaller hands. The "Controller S" was later released in other territories by popular demand and by 2002 replaced the standard controller in the Xbox's retail package, with the larger original controller remaining available as an accessory.

== Software ==
=== Operating system ===
The Xbox runs a custom operating system which is based on a heavily modified version of Windows 2000. It exports APIs similar to those found in Microsoft Windows, such as Direct3D. Its source code was leaked in 2020.

The user interface for the Xbox is called the Xbox Dashboard. It features a media player that can be used to play music CDs, rip CDs to the Xbox's built-in hard drive and play music that has been ripped to the hard drive; it also lets users manage game saves, music, and downloaded content from Xbox Live, and lets Xbox Live users sign in, customize, and manage their account. The dashboard is only available when the user is not watching a movie or playing a game. It uses many shades of green and black for the user interface to be consistent with the physical Xbox color scheme. When the Xbox was released in 2001, the Live service was not online, so the dashboard's Live sections and the network settings sub-menu were not present yet.

Xbox Live was released in November 2002, but in order to access it, users had to buy the Xbox Live starter kit containing a headset and a subscription. While the Xbox was still being supported by Microsoft, the Xbox Dashboard was updated via Live several times to reduce cheating and add features.

=== Games ===
The Xbox launched in North America on November 15, 2001. Popular launch games included Halo: Combat Evolved, Project Gotham Racing, and Dead or Alive 3. All three of these games contributed to the Xbox's success and would go on to sell over a million copies in the US.

Although the console gained strong third-party support from its inception, many early Xbox games did not fully use its powerful hardware until a full year after its release. Xbox versions of cross-platform games sometimes came with a few additional features and/or graphical improvements to distinguish them from the PS2 and GameCube versions of the same game, thus negating one of the Xbox's main selling points. Sony countered the Xbox for a short time by temporarily securing PlayStation 2 exclusives for highly anticipated games such as the Grand Theft Auto series and the Metal Gear Solid series as well as Nintendo for the Resident Evil series. Notable third-party support came from Sega, who announced an 11-game exclusivity deal at Tokyo Game Show. Sega released exclusives such as Jet Set Radio Future, Panzer Dragoon Orta and Sega GT 2002, which were all met with strong reception among critics.

In 2002 and 2003, several high-profile releases helped the Xbox gain momentum and distinguish itself from the PS2. Microsoft purchased Rare, responsible for many Nintendo 64 hit games, to expand their first party portfolio. The Xbox Live online service was launched in late 2002 alongside pilot titles MotoGP, MechAssault and Tom Clancy's Ghost Recon. Several best-selling and critically acclaimed titles for the Xbox soon followed, such as Tom Clancy's Splinter Cell, and Star Wars: Knights of the Old Republic. Take-Two Interactive's exclusivity deal with Sony was amended to allow Grand Theft Auto III and its sequels to be published for the Xbox. Many other publishers got into the trend of releasing the Xbox version alongside the PS2 version, instead of delaying it for months.

2004 saw the release of highly rated exclusives Fable and Ninja Gaiden: both games would become big hits for the Xbox. Later that year, Halo 2 was released and became the highest-grossing release in entertainment history, making over $125 million in its first day and became the best-selling Xbox game worldwide. Halo 2 became Xbox Live's third killer app after MechAssault & Tom Clancy's Rainbow Six 3. That year Microsoft made a deal to put Electronic Arts' popular titles on Xbox Live to boost the popularity of their service.

By 2005, despite notable first party releases in Conker: Live & Reloaded and Forza Motorsport, Microsoft began phasing out the Xbox in favor of their next console, the Xbox 360. Games such as Kameo and Perfect Dark Zero, which were originally to be developed for the Xbox, became Xbox 360 launch titles instead. The last game released on the Xbox was Madden NFL 09, on August 12, 2008.

=== Exhibition discs ===
The Xbox Exhibition disc collection was a game demo compilation series from Microsoft Game Studios used to advertise and preview upcoming Xbox games, featuring several playable game demos, game trailers, video content from G4, music videos, and music from indie artists that were downloadable to the Xbox's hard drive. These discs were distributed at retail over seven volumes from 2002 to 2005. The discs are credited as an early iteration of the downloadable content model, with content including additional levels, roster updates for sports games and expanded game types.

Discs

Title	Date of release	Demos	Downloads	Music videos
Volume 1	January 1, 2002	Dead or Alive 3, Halo: Combat Evolved, Madden NFL 2003, NFL Fever 2003, Panzer Dragoon Orta, Quantum Redshift, Tom Clancy's Splinter Cell, TimeSplitters 2, ToeJam & Earl III: Mission to Earth, Whacked!	Dead or Alive 3 booster pack costumes, two downloadable saves for Project Gotham Racing, and two save files for Rallisport Challenge.	Death Cab for Cutie, John Vanderslice, Rilo Kiley, The Dismemberment Plan, and The Long Winters.
Volume 2	March 5, 2003	All-Star Baseball 2004, Capcom vs. SNK 2 EO, Indiana Jones and the Emperor's Tomb, Kung Fu Chaos, MechAssault, MX Superfly, NBA Inside Drive 2003, Tom Clancy's Ghost Recon, Vexx	NFL Fever 2003 roster update, and new characters and environments for ToeJam & Earl III: Mission to Earth and MX Superfly	
Volume 3	July 17, 2003	Apex, ATV Quad Power Racing 2, Brute Force, Gladius, MLB Inside Pitch 2003, MotoGP 2, NBA Street Vol. 2, Return to Castle Wolfenstein: Tides of War, Tao Feng: Fist of the Lotus	Levels and skins for RLH: Run Like Hell, and an extra mission for Splinter Cell	Depswa, Queens of the Stone Age, Rooney, ...And You Will Know Us by the Trail of Dead, Woven
Volume 4	November 26, 2003	ESPN NBA Basketball, Grabbed by the Ghoulies, Magic the Gathering: Battlegrounds, Metal Arms: Glitch in the System, Prince of Persia: The Sands of Time, Project Gotham Racing 2, Tom Clancy's Rainbow Six 3, Teenage Mutant Ninja Turtles, Voodoo Vince	Levels for Ghost Recon: Island Thunder, Return to Castle Wolfenstein: Tides of War, and Star Wars: The Clone Wars, and four new maps for Unreal Championship	
Volume 5	May 27, 2004	NBA Ballers, Psi-Ops: The Mindgate Conspiracy, Metal Slug 3, Ninja Gaiden, Shadow Ops: Red Mercury, RalliSport Challenge 2, The Chronicles of Riddick: Escape from Butcher Bay	G4 - TV 4 Gamers Episodes: G4's tips and tricks to master Star Wars Knights of the Old Republic; Pulse Get New York Yankee Jason Giambi's insights on ESPN Major League Baseball	
Volume 6	November 17, 2004	Full Spectrum Warrior, Tom Clancy's Rainbow Six 3: Black Arrow, NCAA Football 2005, Men of Valor, OutRun 2, Second Sight, Blinx 2: Masters of Time and Space		
Volume 7	December 2004	Burnout 3: Takedown, Dead or Alive Ultimate, ESPN NHL 2K5, Kingdom Under Fire: The Crusaders, Star Wars Republic Commando, The Incredibles, and The SpongeBob SquarePants Movie		
Volume 8	July 6, 2005	Advent Rising, Batman Begins, Conker: Live & Reloaded, Forza Motorsport, Destroy All Humans!, Digimon World 4, Juiced, Madagascar, Medal of Honor: European Assault, Psychonauts and Star Wars Episode III: Revenge of the Sith		
Volume 9	December 2005	Burnout Revenge, Chicken Little, Ed, Edd n Eddy: The Mis-Edventures, Evil Dead Regeneration, Forza Motorsport, Frogger: Ancient Shadow, Harry Potter and the Goblet of Fire, Kingdom Under Fire: Heroes and Star Wars Battlefront II		

== Services ==
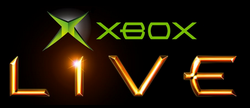
Xbox Live logo used from 2002 to 2010

On November 15, 2002, Microsoft launched its Xbox Live service, allowing subscribers to play online Xbox games with other subscribers around the world and download new content directly to the system's hard drive. The online service works only with a broadband Internet connection. In its first week of operation, Xbox Live received 100,000 subscriptions, and further grew to 250,000 subscribers within two months of the service's launch. In July 2004, Microsoft announced that Xbox Live had reached one million subscribers; in July 2005, membership reached two million, and by July 2007 there were more than three million subscribers. By May 2009, the number had ballooned to twenty million current subscribers. On February 5, 2010, it was reported that Xbox Live support for the original Xbox games would be discontinued as of April 14, 2010. Services were discontinued on schedule, but a group of users later known as the "Noble 14" continued to play for almost a month afterwards by simply leaving their consoles on connected to Halo 2. Despite the discontinuation of Xbox Live in 2010, there are revival servers, such as Insignia which has brought back online multiplayer and other online features to the Xbox again.

== Sales ==
Region	Units sold (as of May 10, 2006)	First available
North America	16 million	November 15, 2001
Europe	6 million	March 14, 2002
Asia & Pacific	2 million	February 22, 2002
Worldwide	24 million	N/A

Prior to launching, anticipation for the Xbox was high, with Toys 'R' Us and Amazon reporting that online preorders had sold out within just 30 minutes. Microsoft stated that it planned to ship 1–1.5 million units to retailers by the end of the year, followed by weekly shipments of 100,000 units. The launch was one of the most successful in video game history, with unit sales surpassing 1 million after just 3 weeks and rising further to 1.5 million by the end of 2001. The system also attained one of the highest-ever attachment rates at launch, with over 3 games selling per unit according to the NPD Group. Strong sales were tied in large part to the highly anticipated launch title, Halo: Combat Evolved, which had surpassed sales of 1 million units by April 2002 and attained a 50% attach rate for the console. In 2003, the console had knocked the GameCube down to third place in terms of market share. By July 2004, the system had sold 15.5 million units worldwide—10.1 million in North America, 3.9 million in Europe, and 1.5 million in Asia-Pacific—and had a 33% market share in the US. In 2008, the original Xbox was still popular and the most played, compared to Sony's PlayStation 3, despite the PlayStation 2 being the most played and sold console In 2008. For almost all of 2008, the original Xbox was still Microsoft's best-selling console compared to its successor; it was only at the end of November 2008 that the Xbox 360 surpassed the original Xbox's sales for the first time since its launch in 2001.

Despite strong sales in North America, Microsoft struggled to make a profit from the Xbox due to its high manufacturing cost. With its initial retail price of $299, Microsoft lost about $125 for every system sold, which cost $425 to manufacture, meaning that the company would have to rely on software sales in order to make any money. According to Robbie Bach, "Probably six months after we shipped, you could see the price curve and do the math and know that we were going to lose billions of dollars." These losses were further exacerbated in April 2002, when Microsoft lowered the retail price of the Xbox even further to $199 in order to further drive hardware sales. Microsoft also struggled to compete with Sony's more popular PlayStation 2 console, which generally saw far higher sales numbers, although the Xbox outsold the PS2 in the U.S. in April 2004. By its manufacturing discontinuation in 2005, the Xbox had sold a total of 24 million units worldwide, 16 million of which had been sold in North America. These numbers fell short of Microsoft's predicted 50 million units, and failed to match the PlayStation 2's lifetime sales of 106 million units at the time, although it did surpass the GameCube and Dreamcast's lifetime sales of 21 million and 10.6 units, respectively, though the GameCube turned out to be more profitable than the Xbox. Ultimately, Microsoft lost an accumulative total of $4 billion from the Xbox, only managing to turn a profit at the end of 2004. While the Xbox represented an overall loss for Microsoft, Gates, Ballmer, and other executives still saw it as a positive result for the company as it brought them into the console marketplace against doubts raised by the industry, and led to Microsoft's further development of other consoles in the Xbox family.

=== Japan ===
Prior to its Japanese launch in February 2002, many analysts estimated that the Xbox would have trouble competing with the PS2 and the GameCube, its local counterparts in the region, noting its comparatively high price tag, lack of exclusives, and larger size which would not fit as well in Japan's smaller living spaces. Microsoft hoped to ship six million Japanese Xbox consoles by June 2002; however, the system had only sold a total of 190,000 units in the region by April of that year, two months after the system's launch in February. For the week ending April 14, 2002, the Xbox sold only 1,800 units, considerably less than the PS2 and GameCube, and failed to see a single title reach the top 50 best-selling video games in Japan. In November 2002, the Xbox chief in Japan stepped down, leading to further consultations about Xbox's future, which by that point had only sold 278,860 units in the country since its February launch. For the week ending July 18, 2004, the Xbox sold just 272 units, even fewer than the PSOne had sold in the same week. The Xbox did, however, outsell the GameCube for the week ending May 26, 2002. Ultimately, the Xbox had only sold 474,992 units in its lifetime. Factors believed to have contributed to the console's poor market presence included its large physical size, which contrasted the country's emphasis on more compact designs, and a lack of Japanese-developed games to aid consumer interest.

== Modding ==
Xbox modding is the practice of circumventing the built-in hardware and software security mechanisms of the Xbox video game console.

=== History ===
The popularity of the Xbox, as well as (in the United States) its comparatively short 90-day warranty, inspired efforts to circumvent the built-in hardware and software security mechanisms, a practice known as "cracking". Within a few months of its release the initial layer of security on the Xbox BIOS (which relied heavily on obfuscation) was broken by MIT student Andrew Huang and the contents of the "hidden" boot ROM embedded on the MCPx chip were extracted using some custom built hardware. Once this information was available, the code was soon modified so that it would skip digital signature checks and media flags, allowing unsigned code, Xbox game backups, etc., to be run. Modding an Xbox in any manner will void its warranty, as it may require disassembly of the console. Having a modified Xbox may also disallow it from accessing Xbox Live, if detected by Microsoft, as it contravenes the Xbox Live Terms of Use, but most modchips can be disabled, allowing the Xbox to boot in a "stock" configuration.

=== Methods ===
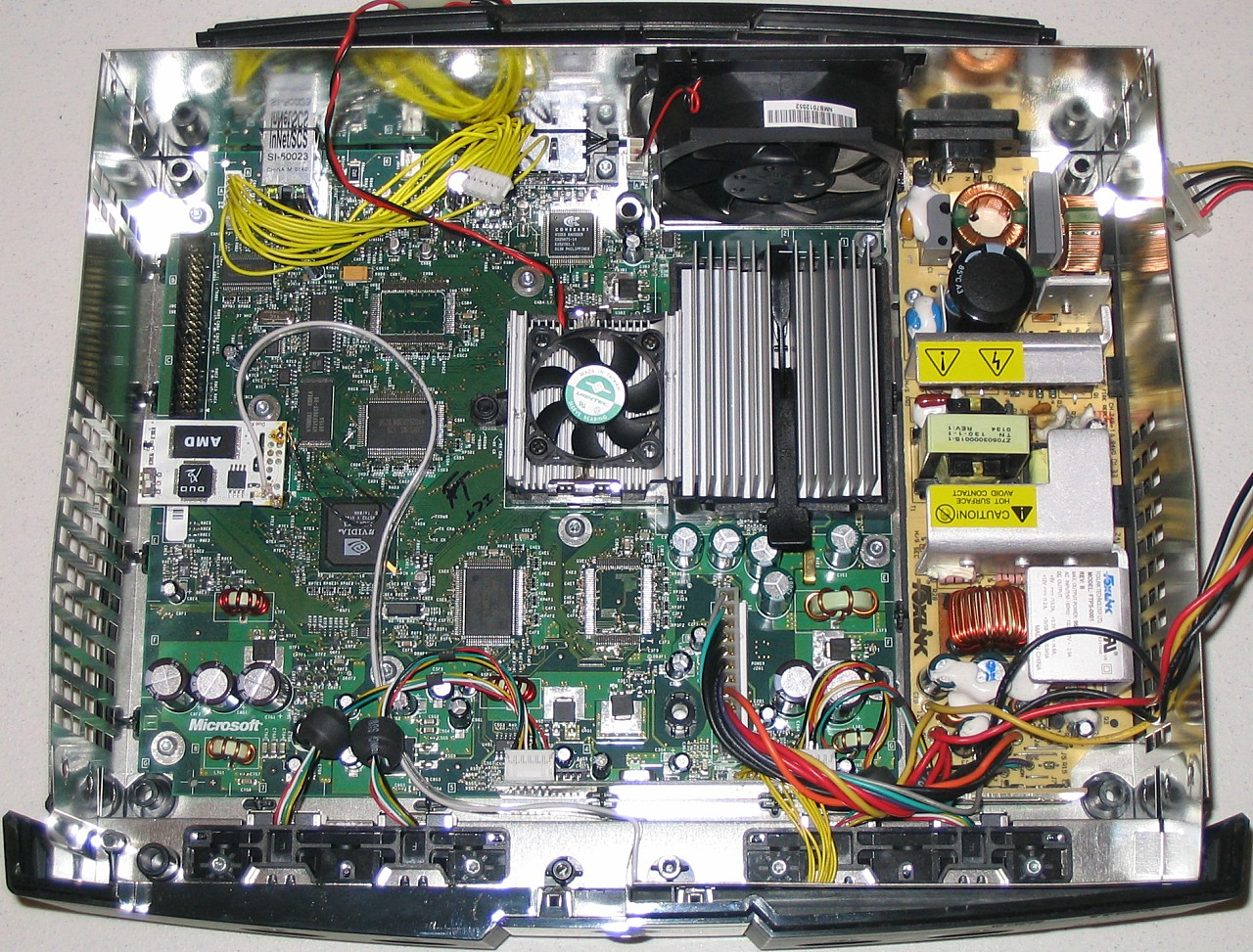
Xbox motherboard, with installed modchip

- Modchip: installing a modchip inside the Xbox that bypasses the original BIOS, with a hacked BIOS to circumvent the security mechanisms.
- TSOP flashing: reflashing the onboard BIOS chip with a hacked BIOS to circumvent the security mechanisms. The Xbox BIOS is contained on a commodity EEPROM (the 'TSOP'), which can be made writable by the Xbox by bridging points on the motherboard. Flashing is usually carried out by using a specially crafted gamesave (see 'Game save exploit', below) to flash the onboard TSOP, but the TSOP can also be de-soldered and re-written in a standard EEPROM programmer. This method only works on 1.0 to 1.5 Xboxes, as version 1.6 (the final hardware version produced) replaced the commodity TSOP with an LPC ROM contained within a proprietary chip.
- Softmods: installing additional software files to the Xbox hard drive, which exploit programming errors in the Dashboard to gain control of the system, and overwrite the in-memory copy of the BIOS. Soft modification is known to be safe for Xbox Live if the user enables multibooting with the Microsoft dashboard and an original game disc is used.
  - Game save exploit: using select official game releases to load game saves that exploit buffer overflows in the save game handling. When these special game saves are loaded, they access an interface with scripts for installing the necessary softmod files. Disassembly of the Xbox is not required when installing most game save exploits.
- Hot swapping: using a computer to change the data on the hard drive. This requires having the Xbox unlock the hard drive when it is turned on, then swapping the powered hard drive into a running computer. By using a Linux-based Live CD, data on the hard drive can be read, altered, and deleted. In most cases, an automated script will automatically install the softmod files directly to the Xbox hard drive. This technique has been used extensively to harbor cheating on many online games. Disassembly of the console is required to perform a hot swap. It's the least recommended as it might shock the Xbox hardware or the user's PC components.

=== Alternative operating systems ===
Beyond gaming, a modded Xbox can be used as a media center with XBMC4Xbox. There are also distributions of Linux developed specifically for the Xbox, including those based on Gentoo, Debian, Damn Small Linux and Dyne:bolic.

Some operating systems ported to Xbox include Linux in the form of Xbox Linux, FreeBSD, NetBSD, Windows CE, and ReactOS.

== See also ==
- Insignia (Xbox)
- List of Xbox games
- Xbox Live Marketplace
