= Woven (band) =

American experimental rock band

- Origin: Los Angeles/Santa Monica, California, United States
- Genres: Rock; Electronica; Industrial; Experimental; Alternative Rock
- Years active: 1997–present
- Labels: Interscope Records; Cat Toy Factory Records
- Members: Ory Hodis (vocals/guitars); Jonathan Burkes (vocals/bass); Mike Jerugim (keyboards/programming); Steve Abagon (guitar/keyboards); Richard Abagon (drums/keyboards); Marc Viner (drums/keyboards)
- Past members: Barak Steddie (bass/keyboards); Beth Bergman (vocals/violin)

Woven is an experimental rock band from Los Angeles, California.

== Biography ==
Woven combines electronica and rock elements, influenced by the likes of Björk, Aphex Twin, Pink Floyd, Jane's Addiction and Deftones, to create music ranging from guitar-driven drum and bass to syncopated, sparse IDM. In 2001, Woven released its debut EP titled EPrime on Interscope records. Songs from EPrime became the fifth most-added to U.S. college radio playlists in the year of its release, and landed spots on Los Angeles-based radio station KCRW 89.9.

In 2003, the band released their first full-length album with Interscope Records, 8 Bit Monk. The review on MSN's Entertainment section said of the album that it "tends to meander in Woven's self-created safe zone between electronic and alt rock", and that the band had upped the groove and removed much of the subtlety it displayed on Eprime. For the album, the band re-enlisted the Irish mixer Steve Fitzmaurice. The album was self-produced by Woven, with additional production by Steve Berlin of Los Lobos and Alan Elliott.

"My Conditioning" and "Soul Fossa", two songs off 8 Bit Monk, gained song placements on CBS's television series CSI: Crime Scene Investigation.

In support of 8 Bit Monk, Woven toured with Dredg, Buckethead, The Apex Theory, Mellowdrone, They Might Be Giants and Wu-Tang Clan's Raekwon among others as well as headlining their own shows and tours.

Woven guitarist Steve Abagon has performed with Perry Farrell and contributed guitar tracks for folk-rock veteran Rickie Lee Jones on her album, The Sermon On Exposition Street. Ory Hodis, Woven's second vocalist and guitarist has also recorded guitar tracks on Perry Farrell's 2001 solo electronica record, Song Yet To Be Sung. Singer/bassist Jonathan Burkes has continued to collaborate with both Steve and Richard Abagon, in the electro-rock bands Piel and A Reminder, respectively.

In 2008, Woven released the follow-up to 8 Bit Monk with the new album "Designer Codes", recorded by drummer Marc Viner at his studio, The Cat Toy Factory.

== Discography ==
=== EPrime ===
- EP (Interscope Records) (2001)
1. Beautiful
2. Tesion
3. Steady
4. Who Knows?
5. Solder Me

=== 8 Bit Monk ===
- (Interscope Records) (2003)
1. Pillage
2. My Conditioning
3. Already Gone
4. I Want Yesterday
5. Astral Low
6. Soul Fossa
7. Who Knows
8. Bubble Wrap
9. Sync or Swim
10. Trepanation
11. Rooftops

=== Aftermath ===
- EP (Cat Toy Factory Recordings) (2007)
1. Inhale
2. You Never Knew
3. Cosmonaut
4. Machine Room
5. Abort Instruction

=== Designer Codes ===
(Cat Toy Factory Recordings) (2008)

1. Trumpeting Strength
2. Perception Whore
3. Fragments
4. Where We Going
5. The One
6. Do You Feel the Same?
7. Been a Long Time
8. Cosmonaut
9. Sadness Last Stand
10. Soundtrack to a Chance Meeting
11. Prickly Pear
12. Inhale
13. Nothin
14. She Blows My Amplifier
