= Souvenirs (Tina Arena album) =

Compilation album by Tina Arena
- Released: 20 November 2000
- Genre: Pop
- Length: 61:20
- Label: Columbia
- Producer: Jim Steinman; Matthew Wilder; Peter Asher; Walter Afanasieff; Andrew Lloyd Webber; Donna Summer; Bruce Sudano; J. Kapler; Christophe Battaglia; Luca Barbarossa

Tina Arena chronology
In Deep (1997)	Souvenirs (2000)	Just Me (2001)

Souvenirs is the first compilation album released exclusively in Australia to highlight Tina Arena's international career over the previous few years. Divided into three sections covering songs from screen, stage and overseas, Souvenirs includes recordings that had not appeared on any of Arena's Australian albums to date. They include songs from soundtracks, live recordings from a performance at the prestigious Olympia Theatre in Paris, and the singles that launched her as a major star on the continent.

== Track listing ==
No.	Title	Writer(s)	Length
1.	"I Want to Spend My Lifetime Loving You"	Horner, Jennings	4:44
2.	"Love's Funny That Way"	Arena, McTaggart, Tyson	4:38
3.	"Show Me Heaven"	McKee, Rackin, Rifkin	4:22
4.	"If I Was a River"	Warren	5:21
5.	"Whistle Down the Wind"	Steinman, Webber	3:54
6.	"No More Tears (Enough Is Enough)" (Live, duet with Donna Summer)	Jabara, Roberts	4:01
7.	"Burn" (live at the Olympia)	Arena, Reswick, Werfel	5:20
8.	"Sorrento Moon (I Remember)" (live at the Olympia)	Arena, Tyson, Ward	5:16
9.	"Chains" (live at the Olympia)	Arena, Reswick, Werfel	5:54
10.	"Live (for the One I Love)"	Amcos, Cocciante, Jennings	3:40
11.	"Les trois cloches"	Villard	5:19
12.	"Segnali di fumo" (duet with Luca Barbarossa)	Barbarossa	3:47
13.	"Aller plus haut"	J. Kapler	5:04
Total length:			61:20

Bonus multimedia tracks
No.	Title	Writer(s)	Length
14.	"Aller plus haut" (music video)	J. Kapler	3:52
15.	"Les trois cloches" (music video)	Villard	3:47
16.	"If I Was a River" (music video)	Warren	3:59

== Charts and certifications ==
Chart (2000)	Peak position
Australian Albums Chart	37

Region	Certification	Certified units/sales
Australia (ARIA)	Gold	35,000^{^}
^{^} Shipments figures based on certification alone.
