= Now I Can Dance (book) =

- Author: Tina Arena
- Language: English
- Subject: Tina Arena
- Genre: Non-fiction, memoir
- Publisher: Harper Collins Publishing
- Publication date: 14 October 2013
- Publication place: Australia
- Media type: Hardcover, paperback, digital eBook
- Pages: 336 pages
- ISBN: 9780732297565

Now I Can Dance is an autobiography by Australian singer-songwriter Tina Arena. Arena says, "I don't know what I would do if I couldn't write and sing. It makes me who I am, regardless of where I happen to be or what language I'm speaking. It has done since I wrote my first song and sang it to myself in the shower. It's as natural for me as breathing."

The title of her memoir, Now I Can Dance is taken from the third single from Arena's third studio album In Deep (1997). The track was written by Arena while living in L.A. and is a love letter from her to her family, as she explained in her autobiography. The song was successful in her native Australia, reaching #13 on the ARIA Singles Chart.

In 2017, Arena updated her autobiography with the release of a new edition of Now I Can Dance (book), with new content covering her relocation from France back to Australia, being inducted into the 2015 ARIA Hall of Fame, the release of new music, and new musical ventures. Publisher: HarperCollins Publishers (Australia) Pty Ltd 2nd Edition (May 22, 2017).

== Reception ==
ABC shop describe the book as an honest, gritty, funny, frank and totally revealing autobiography from much loved songstress Tina Arena, who is about to celebrate a phenomenally successful 40 years as a singer/songwriter."

Harper Collins said "Tina has amassed a cache of amazing stories. The artist who gave us "Chains", "Sorrento Moon" and "Symphony of Life" has sold eight million albums, won a swag of awards, encountered extraordinary people, fallen in and out of love, and experienced incredible highs and lows."
