= While the Angelus Was Ringing =

1948 song

Song
- Published: 1948
- Genre: Popular music
- Composer: Jean Villard
- Lyricist: Dick Manning

"While the Angelus Was Ringing" is a popular song, adapted from the Swiss song "Les trois cloches" (originally written in French by composer Jean Villard, subsequently rendered into English as "The Three Bells") by Dick Manning.

The song was recorded by a number of artists in 1949.

== Recorded versions ==
- Johnny Desmond with Tony Mottola (released by MGM Records as catalog number 10358B, with the flip side "Peggy Dear")
- Tommy Dorsey and his orchestra (released by RCA Victor Records as catalog number 20-3331, with the flip side "So in Love")
- Dick Haymes and Jeff Alexander (recorded January 16, 1949, released by Decca Records as catalog number 24567, with the flip side "A Rosewood Spinet")
- Eddy Howard and his orchestra (recorded May 1949, released by Mercury Records as catalog number 5254, with the flip side "Someone Like You")
- Allan Jones
- Josef Locke
- Guy Lombardo (recorded March 16, 1949, released by Decca Records as catalog number 24614, with the flip side "Need You")
- Anne Shelton
- Frank Sinatra (recorded December 19, 1948, released by Columbia Records as catalog number 38407, with the flip side "Comme Ci, Comme Ça")
- Margaret Whiting (recorded December 23, 1948, released by Capitol Records as catalog number 15364, with the flip side "My Dream Is Yours")
- The German version was entitled "Wenn die Glocken hell erklingen".

== See also ==
- The Three Bells
