= Urfer =

Urfer is a surname. Notable people with the surname include:

- Albert Urfer (1914–1985), Swiss musician
- Selma Urfer (1928–2013), Swiss author
