= The Mask of Zorro (soundtrack) =

1998 soundtrack album

The Mask of Zorro: Music from the Motion Picture

Soundtrack album by James Horner
- Released: July 7, 1998
- Recorded: 1997–1998
- Studios: Associated Independent Recording, London, England
- Genres: Soundtrack, Film score
- Length: 74:47
- Labels: Sony Classical Records; Epic Soundtrax
- Producers: Jim Steinman; Simon Rhodes; Tony Hinnigan; James Horner

James Horner soundtracks chronology
Deep Impact (1998)	The Mask of Zorro: Music from the Motion Picture (1998)	Back to Titanic (1998)

Singles from The Mask of Zorro: Music from the Motion Picture
- 1. "I Want to Spend My Lifetime Loving You" Released: October 9, 1998

Professional ratings
Review scores
Source	Rating
AllMusic	3/5 stars
Empire	3/5 stars
Filmtracks	5/5 stars
SoundtrackNet	2.5/5 stars

The Mask of Zorro: Music from the Motion Picture is the soundtrack album to Martin Campbell's 1998 film The Mask of Zorro. The soundtrack was composed and conducted by James Horner, who was hired to work on the film score in September 1997. The soundtrack was released by Sony Classical Records and Epic Soundtrax. The orchestral score was heavily influenced by the music of the Iberian peninsula and features several themes, which are written in the harmonic minor scale.

The soundtrack was commercially successful and propelled by the rising profile of Marc Anthony and Australian singer Tina Arena. Their duet, "I Want to Spend My Lifetime Loving You", plays in the closing credits of the film and was released as a single in Europe. The song went #3 on the French singles and #4 on the Dutch singles charts, and it won Outstanding Performance of a Song for a Feature Film at the 1999 ALMA Awards. An expanded limited edition of the soundtrack was released in 2023.

== Composition ==
The soundtrack features four main themes, and it makes use of the flamenco guitar, Spanish guitar, Spanish rhythms, Mexican motifs and swashbuckling brass with mariachi elements. There is also the use of castanets, maracas, tambourines, clarinets, alto flutes, quena and the zampona as percussion accents. The combination of the flamenco guitars and brass were compared to the works of Erich Wolfgang Korngold, Max Steiner, and Miklós Rózsa.

The first, and the primary theme of the film, is the main adventure motif for Zorro, which is heard through the track "Zorro's Theme" and "Main Titles". It begins with a minute-long foot-tapping music at a quickening tempo with the intermittent Spanish guitar, that builds momentum to a false crescendo. The twelve note theme is accompanied by flamenco foot taps and handclapping (the ascending and descending rhythmic structure is influenced from Latin folk music). The main theme also has a soft, romantic form, though it is mostly played in a fast-paced adventurous tone in the score with brass, Spanish guitar and shakuhachi. The reprisal of the main theme plays frequently until the soft prelude to the Love Theme finishes it off.

The second theme is the Love Theme, which is heard in gentle and romantic form, and is found twenty seconds into "Zorro's Theme" and throughout "Elena and Esperanza" on strings, forming the melodic center for the end credits song, I Want to Spend My Lifetime Loving You. The 'Love Theme' generally echoes the relationship between Elena and her father. There is the 'Family Theme' which debuts two minutes into "Elena and Esperanza" and Elena's theme, and is used sparingly in the tracks "Elena And Esperanza" and "The Confession". There is also the danger motif that is heard repeatedly, and a short tense motif for the antagonist Don Rafael Montero in "The Mine", which features Horner's signature thumping clangs.

== Reception ==
In a positive review, Zanobard Reviews stated that James Horner's score to the film is "the late great composer at the top of his game, with his masterful use of orchestra and some truly gorgeous themes altogether crafting a soundtrack that’s part swashbucklingly heroic, part breathtakingly romantic and all just impeccably entertaining." Omnipublishing reviewed that "the themes, orchestration, and rhythmic intensity all create a score full of elegant style and intelligence". Empire wrote that the score is Horner's "another fine slice of work" and concludes that "the foreboding rumble of 'Elena's Truth' and the pan-piped unease of 'Leave No Witnesses' add the real depth".

Filmtracks gave the score 5/5 stars, stating that "Both works [The Mask of Zorro and The Legend of Zorro] mark unique high points in Horner's career, and both represent the most memorably accomplished score released during their respective years", before expressing that Horner's score is "extremely memorable and distinctive in a career that was otherwise criticized for self-referencing", although the review stated the sequel had superior music when it came to technicality. It also opined that the score was "a Latin variation on the composer's popular Willow, taking the best thematic and instrumental tendencies from the 1988 score and performing a cultural rearrangement for the setting of early California and the flair of Zorro's personality".

Allmusic described the score as "sweeping and melodramatic", and being "more richer and varied" than the Titanic (1997) score. In a negative review, Soundtrack.Net stated that Horner stole music from Samuel Barber and from his own work as well, such as Aliens (1986). The review also stated that Horner created "a lot of unnecessary bombastic material, much the same fate Willow suffered, but at least here he's allowed to use a solo trumpet to play different scale progressions", before adding that Horner at least tried "to tackle an ethnic music genre that wasn't based, born, or bred on the English isles".

== Track listing ==
All music is composed by James Horner.

The Mask Of Zorro (Music From The Motion Picture)
No.	Title	Length
1.	"The Plaza Of Execution"	8:28
2.	"Elena And Esperanza"	8:20
3.	"The Ride"	3:25
4.	"Elena's Truth"	4:11
5.	"The Fencing Lesson"	5:29
6.	"Tornado In The Barracks"	5:12
7.	"The Confession"	3:43
8.	"Zorro's Theme"	3:01
9.	"The Mine (Montero's Vision)"	3:00
10.	"Stealing The Map"	6:30
11.	""Leave No Witnesses…""	13:21
12.	"Diego's Goodbye"	5:31
13.	"I Want To Spend My Lifetime Loving You"	4:41
Total length:		74:47

The score was edited at Abbey Road Studios in London. Thomas Pasatieri served as an additional orchestrator. I Want to Spend My Lifetime Loving You was arranged by Jeff Bova and Jim Steinman.

=== Expanded version ===
The Mask of Zorro - Expanded
- The original 1997 cover is used for the expanded album

Soundtrack album by James Horner
- Released: November 24, 2023
- Genre: Soundtrack
- Length: 138:08
- Label: La-La Land Records LLLCD 1631
- Producers: Neil S. Bulk and Mike Matessino

La-La Land Records released a 2-disc set, expanded limited edition album on November 24, 2023, which includes the original 1997 release (track 10 onwards on disc 2). The album also features the Spanish-Language version of "I Want To Spend My Lifetime Loving You" ('Quiero Vivir La Vida Amandote') performed by Jon Secada and Ana Gabriel as a bonus track. The album features art design by Jim Titus and has a runtime of 2 hours and 18 minutes.

Disc 1

1. Main Title (2:12)
2. The Plaza of Execution (7:58
3. Elena and Esperanza (8:17)
4. Don't Touch My Daughter (0:28)
5. Interrupted Getaway (1:09)
6. Joaquin's Death (0:59)
7. Meeting On the Beach (1:11)
8. Prison Escape (4:15)
9. The Hand / Emotions Torn (3:04)
10. Diego Meets Alejandro (1:29)
11. The Medallion / The Master's Wheel (1:12)
12. The Fencing Lesson (Film Version) (1:37)
13. Lesson #3 (1:15)
14. The Black Tornado / First Meeting (3:10)
15. Tornado in the Barracks (5:08)
16. The Confession (Film Version) (2:50)
17. Rooftop Getaway (1:23)
18. Choose Your Weapon (1:17)
19. Diego in the Study (0:39)
20. Sexy Dance (1:11)
21. The Mine (Montero's Vision) (2:57)
22. Jack's Demise (1:06)
23. Love's Suspicions (1:20)
24. So Long Ago... (2:50)
25. Sick Souvenirs (1:39)
26. An Unknown Past (2:24)

Disc 2

1. The Map (6:27)
2. Alejandro & Elena's Duel (3:56)
3. The Ride (3:22)
4. Alejandro's Plea (0:51)
5. Elena's Truth (4:07)
6. "Leave No Witnesses..." (13:19)
7. Diego's Goodbye (Film Version) (4:55)
8. Zorro's Theme (Film Version) (2:56)
9. I Want to Spend My Lifetime Loving You (Marc Anthony and Tina Arena) (4:42)
10. The Plaza of Execution (8:27)
11. The Fencing Lesson (5:24)
12. The Confession (3:38)
13. Diego's Goodbye (5:19)
14. Zorro's Theme (2:56)
15. Quiero Vivir La Vida Amandote (Jon Secada and Ana Gabriel) (4:42)

== Personnel ==
- Composer and Conductor – James Horner
- Contractor (Orchestra) – Isobel Griffiths, Sandy de Crescent
- Edited By – Simon Kiln
- Engineer (Assistant) – Andy Bass, David Marquette, John Bailey, Nick Wollage
- Engineer – Jay Selvester, Kirsten Smith, Marc Gebauer
- Mastered By – Patricia Sullivan Fourstar
- Orchestrated By – James Horner
- Orchestrated By (Additional) – Thomas Pasatieri
- Producer (Album) – James Horner, Simon Rhodes, Tony Hinnigan
- Recorded and Mixed By – Simon Rhodes
- Soloist (Instrumental Soloist) – Dean Parks, Ian Underwood, James Woodrow, Kazu Matsui, Tony Hinnigan
- Stage Manager (Lyndhurst Hall) – Alison Burton
