= If I Was a River =

1998 single by Tina Arena

Single by Tina Arena

from the album In Deep
- Released: 12 October 1998
- Length: 5:21 (album version); 4:07 (radio edit)
- Label: Columbia; Epic
- Songwriter: Diane Warren
- Producer: Walter Afanasieff

Tina Arena singles chronology
"I Want to Spend My Lifetime Loving You" (1998)	"If I Was a River" (1998)	"Aller plus haut" (1999)

"If I Was a River" is a song written by Diane Warren and included on the international version of Australian singer Tina Arena's fourth studio album, In Deep (1997). It is the second Warren song performed by Arena, following 1989's "Strong as Steel". The track was aimed at promoting In Deep in the United States. Lyrically, the song is a metaphoric declaration to a loved one, in which Tina Arena lists all the things she would do for them if she were various elements, planets or weather phenomena, including the titular river. The song was one of 10 singles released from the many incarnations of In Deep; overall, it was the album's seventh.

Released as the final single from the album in the United Kingdom, "If I Was a River" peaked at number 43 on the UK Singles Chart. In 2000, "If I Was a River" was released as a single in Japan, alongside four remixes of the track, commissioned for club play in the United States, where they were only made available on vinyl to disc-jockeys. The rarity of the Japanese release makes it a much sought-after item. The song was later included on the compilation albums Souvenirs and Greatest Hits 1994-2004.

== Track listings ==
UK CD1

1. "If I Was a River"
2. "Any Other Love"
3. "Chains"

UK CD2

1. "If I Was a River" (long version)
2. "Welcome to My World"
3. "Stay"

Japanese CD single

1. "If I Was a River" (album version)
2. "If I Was a River" (7--inch vocal mix)
3. "If I Was a River" (Nikolas & Sibley Rising Dub)
4. "If I Was a River" (Ny:pd radio edit)
5. "If I Was a River" (Ny:pd club remix)

== Personnel ==
- Tina Arena: lead vocals, background vocals
- Diane Warren: songwriter
- Walter Afanasieff: producer, arranger, keyboards, drum programming, synthesizers, Moog synth bass, Synclavier programming
- Dan Shea: additional keyboards, drum programming, synthesizer programming, MacIntosh programming
- Dean Parks: acoustic guitar
- Michael Landau, Michael Thompson: electric guitars
- Alex Brown, Jim Gilstrap, Lynn Davis, Phillip Ingram, Jeanie Tracy, Karen Brewington, Claytoven Richardson, Skyler Jett, Sandy Griffith: background vocals

== Charts ==
Chart (1998)	Peak position
Scottish Singles Sales (Official Charts)	49
UK Singles (Official Charts)	43

== Release history ==
Region	Date	Format(s)	Label(s)	Ref.
United Kingdom	12 October 1998	CD; cassette	Columbia	
United States	13 October 1998	Contemporary hit radio	Epic	
United States	2 February 1999	Adult contemporary radio	Epic	
Japan	14 April 1999	CD	Epic	
