= Lara's Theme =

Main musical theme in the film Doctor Zhivago

"Lara's Theme" is the name given to a leitmotif written for the 1965 film Doctor Zhivago by composer Maurice Jarre. Soon afterward, the leitmotif became the basis of the song "Somewhere, My Love". Numerous versions, both orchestral and vocal, have been recorded; among the most popular was the version by Ray Conniff Singers.

== Composition and recording ==
Maurice Jarre was asked by director David Lean to write the score for Doctor Zhivago, including a theme for the character of Lara, played by Julie Christie. Initially Lean had desired to use a well-known Russian song but could not locate the rights to it, and delegated responsibility to Jarre. Lean informed Jarre he was working under time constraint and that the score needed to be composed and recorded in a few weeks.

Jarre wrote a number of themes for the film, however, Lean was dissatisfied with the theme for Lara. Lean suggested to Jarre that, rather than thinking about Zhivago or Russia, he should go to the mountains with his girlfriend and write a love theme for her. Lean said the theme should not be specifically about Russia, rather it should be a universal theme. Jarre spent the weekend in the mountains above Los Angeles, and by Monday, he found "Lara's Theme" when composing on the piano in an hour.

In editing Zhivago, Lean and producer Carlo Ponti reduced or outright deleted many of the themes composed by Jarre; Jarre was unhappy because he felt that an over-reliance on "Lara's Theme" would ruin the soundtrack.

== Use of theme in film ==
On the Doctor Zhivago soundtrack album, there is no track listed as "Lara's Theme". A variation of the piece appears in numerous sections, however. Some tracks briefly include it, while others are composed entirely from the motif. The orchestration is varied, most notably with balalaika and orchestra.

One of the main reasons the theme is featured in so many tracks is that an impromptu balalaika orchestra was hired from several Russian Orthodox Churches in Los Angeles; the musicians could only learn 16 bars of music at a time and could not read written music. Edgar Stanistreet, a street musician from Philadelphia, claimed that he was asked to play the song over the telephone to an MGM executive and was later taken into the studio to record. He was not credited, however. Tracks which feature it include (from the 1995 Extended Soundtrack release):

- 1) Overture – a fast-paced march version of it plays during part of the pre-credits overture
- 2) Main Title – a significant portion of the Main Theme is devoted to "Lara's Theme" arranged with balalaika, strings and accordion.
- 3) Kontakion/Funeral Song – briefly cited at the end of the piece
- 12) After Deserters Killed The Colonel – again, a brief "quote" from it appears at the end of the song
- 14) Lara Says Goodbye To Yuri – The first extensive use of "Lara's Theme" is a sad version played with heavy balalaika and violin sections
- 23) Yuri Follows the Sound of the Waterfall
- 24) Tonya and Yuri Arrive At Varykino – briefly cited in the middle of the track
- 27) Yuri and the Daffodils – plays during the "changing of seasons" part of the film, the monotonous winter theme builds into a full-fledged rendition of "Lara's Theme"
- 28) On A Yuriatin Street – a complete rendition with full orchestral backing
- 29) In Lara's Bedroom
- 30) Yuri Rides To Yuriatin
- 33) Yuri Is Escaping – a gloomy military march is punctuated by a quote from "Lara's Theme" which ultimately turns into a climax
- 37) Yuri Is Trying To Write
- 39) Lara Reads Her Poem
- 42) Then It's A Gift (End Title) – very similar to "On A Yuriatin Street", a complete, triumphant final rendition of the song

This soundtrack also includes jazz, rock 'n' roll, and swing versions of "Lara's Theme" which were performed by the MGM Studio Orchestra between takes.

== Early vocal recordings ==
Jarre's aesthetic fears notwithstanding, the theme became an instant success and gained fame throughout the world. Paul Webster took the theme and added lyrics to it to create "Somewhere, My Love". Connie Francis was initially interested in recording the song, but withdrew from the project when the lyrics were presented to her because she thought of them as too "corny". A few weeks later, Francis reconsidered her position and recorded the song nonetheless, but by then Ray Conniff had also recorded a version of his own, and his version reached No. 9 on the Billboard Hot 100 chart in 1966. Conniff's version of the song also topped the "Easy listening" chart in the U.S. for four weeks. Despite Conniff's success, Francis also had her version released as a single, and although it failed to chart in the US, it became one of her biggest successes internationally, reaching "Top 5" in territories such as Scandinavia and Asia. In the UK Mike Sammes Singers released a vocal version in 1966, which peaked at number 14 on the British chart in 1967.

Various other versions of the song have since been released, including many in different languages. Six different French language versions (and 16 French orchestral versions) of "La Chanson de Lara" were released in France and Belgium in 1966–1967, with the best-selling ones by Ivorian-French singer John William (over 260,000 copies) and the French group Les Compagnons de la chanson (nearly 300,000 sold), and all versions sold a total of over a million copies in France. In Italy, 44 different versions were released, among them were vocal versions titled "Dove non so" recorded by Orietta Berti, Rita Pavone and Connie Francis. Other languages included German, "Schiwago Melodie (Weißt du wohin?)" by Karel Gott; Swedish, "Nå'nstans, nå'ngång" ("Somewhere, Sometime") by Country Four and Marianne Kock; and Danish, "Et Sted Min Ven" ("Somewhere My Friend") by Poul Bundgaard.

== Charting versions ==
- Ray Conniff had a hit around the world with "Somewhere My Love" in 1966. It reached No, 9 on Billboard Hot 100, and No. 1 on the Easy Listening chart. and No. 1 in Australia and South Africa, No. 7 in Canada, as well as No. 15 in Netherlands and No. 25 in West Germany.
- Maurice Jarre's version was also very successful, reaching No. 1 in Austria, No. 3 in Belgium, and No. 4 in West Germany.
- Roger Williams instrumental version of "Lara's Theme" reached No. 65 on the Hot 100, and No. 5 on the Easy Listening chart in 1966 (US).
- The Brass Ring's instrumental version reached No. 36 on the Easy Listening chart, and No. 126 on the Bubbling under Hot 100 chart.
- MGM Strings reached No. 19 on Canada's AC charts, January 24, 1966.
- Mike Sammes Singers' vocal version of "Somewhere My Love" was released in 1966 and peaked at No. 14 in 1967 in the UK.
- Manuel & the Music of the Mountains' orchestral version reached No. 42 in the UK in 1966.
- Charlie Matthews & The Royal Showband had a No. 1 hit with "Somewhere My Love" in Ireland in 1966.
- Les Compagnons de la chanson and John William (Ernest Armand Huss) both released a French version as "La Chanson de Lara". Les Compagnons charted in top 3 in France, and both Les Compagnons and William reached No. 3 in Belgium in 1966.
- Karel Gott released a German version as "Schiwago Melodie (Weißt du wohin?)" in 1967 which reached No. 9 in Germany.
- Red Steagall had a US Top 40 Country hit with "Somewhere My Love" in 1973. It reached No. 65 in Canada.

== Other recordings ==
Vocal versions include recordings by:

- Connie Francis (in English as Somewhere, My Love, in Spanish as Sueño de Amor, and in Italian as Dove non so.
- Ivan Rebroff in Russian and English
- Peter Alexander in German as Weißt du, wohin.
- Tereza Kesovija, Nada Knežević and Marjana Deržaj also recorded Lara's Theme in Yugoslavia as Larina pjesma (in Croatian), Larina pesma (in Serbian) and Larina pesem (in Slovenian) respectively.
- Andy Williams released a version in 1967 on his pop top-10 album, Born Free.
- In 1966 Mrs. Miller covered the song in her second Capitol Records album Will Success Spoil Mrs. Miller?
- Frank Sinatra covered the song with an Ernie Freeman arrangement for his "That's Life" album in 1966.
- Italio-American tenor, Sergio Franchi covered the song as "Somewhere, My Love" in his 1967 RCA Victor album From Sergio – With Love.

Instrumental versions include:

- Ronnie Aldrich covered the song in Ronnie Aldrich And His Two Pianos for his 1967 Decca LP "Two Pianos In Hollywood" under the title Lara's Theme (From "Dr. Zhivago").
- Harry James recorded a jazz version on his album The King James Version (Sheffield Lab LAB 3, 1976).
- A music box plays "Lara's Theme" at the beginning of the film The Spy Who Loved Me (1977).

== Accolades ==
In 1967, "Somewhere, My Love" won Grammy Award for Best Performance by a Chorus, and was nominated for the Grammy Award for Song of the Year. It lost to "Michelle" by John Lennon and Paul McCartney of The Beatles.
