= Les Compagnons de la chanson =

French vocal group

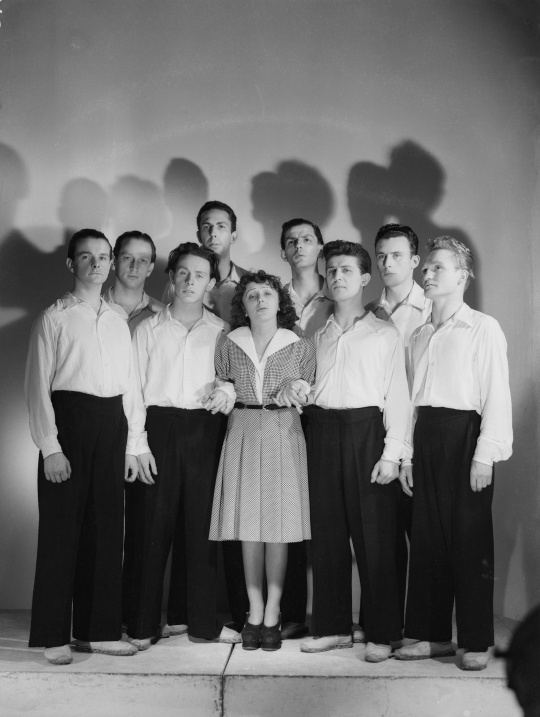
- Les Compagnons de la chanson performing with Édith Piaf in 1946

Background information
- Origin: Lyon, France
- Genres: Folk; pop; chanson
- Years active: 1941/1946–1985
- Past members: Fred Mella; Jo Frachon; Jean Broussolle; Guy Bourguignon; Jean-Louis Jaubert; Hubert Lancelot; Jean-Pierre Calvet; Gérard Sabbat; René Mella; Paul Buissonneau; Marc Herrand; Jean Albert; Michel Cassez; Mario Hirlé; Jean Driant; Paul Méry

Les Compagnons de la chanson were a French harmony vocal group, formed in 1946 from an earlier group founded in Lyon, France in 1941. Their best known song was "Les trois cloches" recorded with Edith Piaf in 1946. Consisting of eight or nine members in the group, they were popular in France, with some success internationally. They performed until 1985 when they disbanded.

== Career ==
Les Compagnons de la chanson were originally part of a larger choir formed in 1941 in Lyon under the direction of Louis Liébar. The choir was part of the Compagnons de France youth movement of Vichy France, and later acquired the name Compagnons de la musique. The group first met Edith Piaf in 1944 in a benefit concert for railway workers in Paris, and Piaf decided to help promote the group. They became Les Compagnons de la chanson in 1946, and Piaf launched the group in Paris in May 1946 at a concert in Club des Cinq. Jean Cocteau, who was in attendance at their show, wrote of their performance: "The miracle has happened that these two solitudes joined together to create a sound artefact which so expresses France that the tears start to flow."

In July 1946, Les Compagnons and Piaf recorded a French language song, "Les trois cloches", which was written by Jean Villard with an arrangement by group member Marc Herrand. Other songs they recorded with Piaf included "Céline", "Dans les prisons de Nantes", and "C'est pour ça", but it was "Les trois cloches" that would be their most successful song.

Les Compagnons performed with Piaf for two years, including a successful tour in the United States, where they introduced the song "Les trois cloches" to the American audience. The lyrics of the English version, "The Three Bells", were written by Bert Reisfeld in 1948. Les Compagnons recorded "The Three Bells" without Piaf, and their version of the song reached No. 14 in the United States in 1952, later peaking at No. 21 in the UK Singles Chart in October 1959. The song later became a No. 1 hit for the Browns in 1959, with over one million copies in the United States. The Browns' version also reached No. 6 in the UK chart.

The line-up of Les Compagnons changed over time, but for a large part of their career they had nine members: three tenors, three baritones and three basses, with Fred Mella their principal tenor soloist. In the beginning they usually performed a cappella or with a guitar or another instrument, later performances also included orchestral accompaniment.

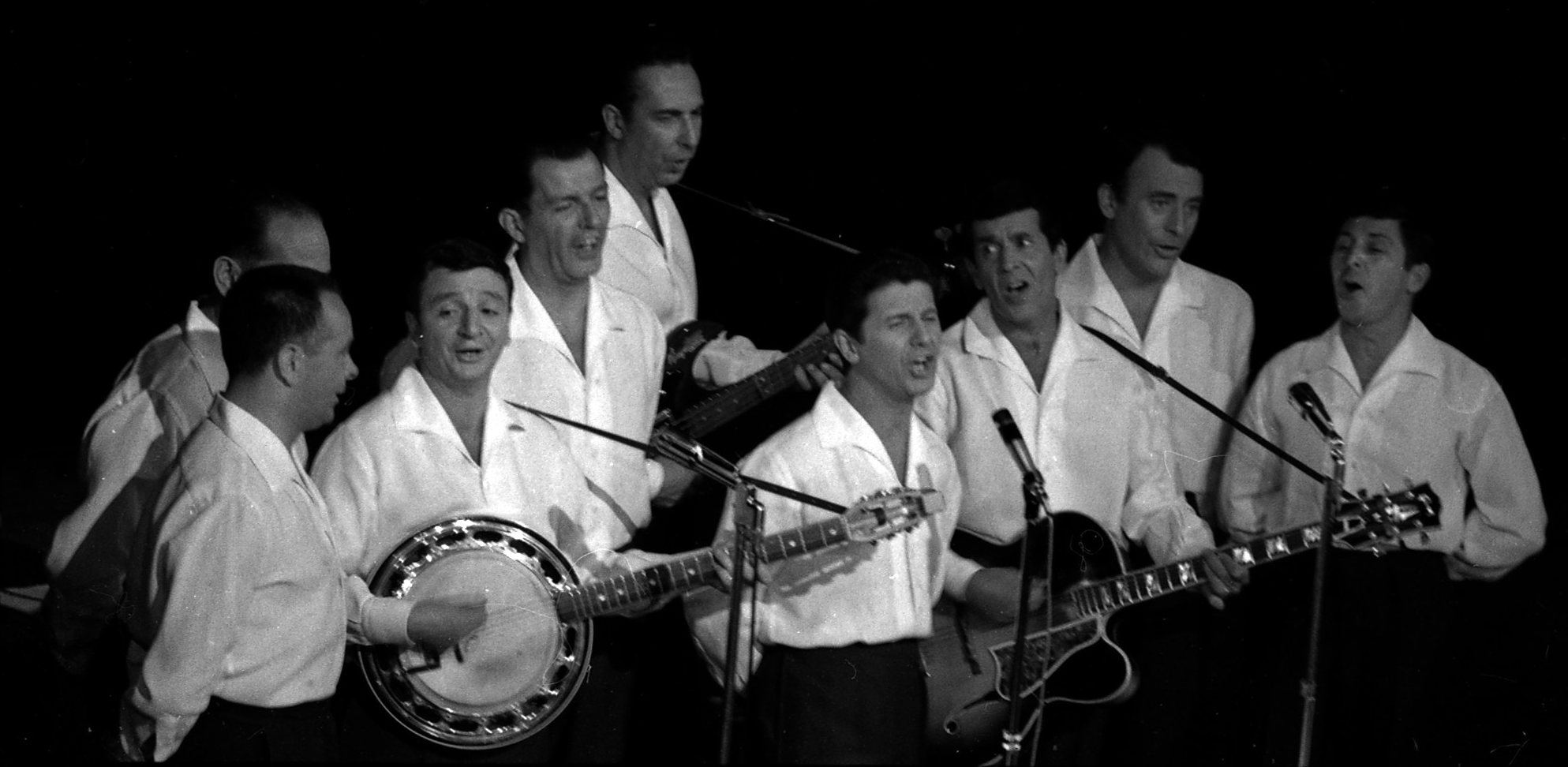
Les Compagnons de la chanson on stage during the Night of the Foreign Legion at the Théâtre du Capitole, Toulouse, France, 2 June 1965

They appeared in the 1948 film with Piaf, Neuf Garçons, un cœur. They also performed in the operetta Minnie Moustache in 1956 written by group member Jean Broussolle and Georges van Parys.

After the group and Piaf went on their separate ways, they continued to enjoy successes in France and Belgium until the late 1960s when one of the early members Guy Bourguignon died. Some of Les Compagnons de la chanson's biggest hits were "Le marchand de bonheur", "La marche des anges", "Marin (Enfant du voyage)", "Gondolier", "Tom Dooley", "La chanson de Lara", "Verte campagne" ("Greenfields") and the aforementioned and re-titled "The Three Bells". Many songs were original compositions, but a large number were covers. They had association with Charles Aznavour, covering some of his songs and had successes with songs co-written with him, such as "Un Mexicain" and "Roméo".

The group also toured internationally, including North America multiple times, Africa, Russia, Israel, Japan and other countries.

Les Compagnons de la chanson made over 350 records and undertook up to 300 concerts per year. They decided to disband in 1980, but their farewell tour lasted for a few years more. Their final concert was 14 February 1985, at the Olympia in Paris. Fred Mella continued to perform as a solo artist until 2008.

== Members ==
The members of the group were varied from the beginning. At the end of 1946, the members of the group were Fred Mella (tenor, 1924–2019), Marc Holtz/Herrand (tenor and conductor, 1925–2023), Paul Buissonneau (tenor, 1926–2014), Jean Albert (tenor, 1920–2003), Gérard Sabbat (baritone, 1926–2013), Hubert Lancelot (baritone, 1923–1995), Jean-Louis Jaubert (bass, 1920–2013), Guy Bourguignon (bass, 1920–1969), and Jo Frachon (bass, 1919–1992). Fred Mella was the tenor soloist of the group.

The line-up of the group continued to change over the years. Buissonneau left after a tour of Quebec in 1949 when he married a Canadian and chose to stay in Canada. He was replaced by Mella's younger brother René (1926–2019). Marc Herrand left in 1952 to resume his career as a conductor and was replaced by Jean Broussolle (baritone and composer, 1920–1984). Jean Albert left in 1956 to pursue a solo career, and was replaced by Jean-Pierre Calvet (tenor and lyricist, 1925–1989). Guy Bourguignon died in 1969 but they decided not to replace him. Jean Broussolle left in 1972 to concentrate on his career as a composer, and was replaced by Michel Cassez (Gaston) (1931–2025). Other members included Mario Hirlé (1925–1992).

== Discography ==
=== Singles ===
- "Allez savoir pourquoi" (1960, FR: No. 9; BEL: No. 7)
- "Alors raconte" (1955, FR: 24; BEL: No. 7)
- "Amour brésilien" (1962, FR: 70; BEL: Tip)
- "Angelo"
- "À Noël"
- "À nos amours"
- "Au printemps tu reviendras"
- "Au temps de Pierrot et Colombine" (1971, BEL: No. 26)
- "Au Venezuela"
- "Aux marches du palais"
- "Avant de nous embarquer (Minnie Moustache)"
- "Avec ce soleil"
- "Ave Maria"
- "Belle petite ville"
- "Bras dessus, bras dessous" (1960, FR: 6; BEL: No. 8)
- "Carioca, mon ami"
- "Catherine"
- "Ce bonheur-là" (1968, FR: 18; BEL: No. 48)
- "Ce jour viendra"
- "Ce n'est pas un adieu"
- "Ce sacré vieux soleil"
- "Céline"
- "C'est ça l'amore" (1959, FR: 25; BEL: No. 15)
- "C'est pour ça"
- "C'est ma chanson" (1967, FR: 11; BEL: No. 43)
- "C'était hier"
- "C'était mon copain" (1956, FR: No. 43)
- "Chanson à ma bien-aimée"
- "Chanson pour l'Auvergnat" (1956, FR: No. 33)
- "Chante-la ta chanson !"
- "Cheveux fous et lèvres roses" (1962, FR: 12; BEL: No. 44)
- "Cindy Cindy O Cindy"
- "Cinq filles à marier"
- "Comme le ruisseau"
- "Comment va la vie ?"
- "Comme un p'tit coquelicot"
- "Compagnons de la Marjolaine"
- "Dans les prisons de Nantes"
- "D'autres avant toi"
- "Day-O (The Banana Boat Song)" (1957, FR: 18; BEL: Tip)
- "De ville en ville" (1963, BEL: No. 46)
- "Des milliers de soldats" (1965, BEL: Tip)
- "Dites moi qui" (1971, BEL: No. 43)
- "Do ré mi"
- "Douce nuit"
- "Doux c'est doux"
- "Elle chante"
- "En d'autres mots"
- "Enfin j'ai ma maison"
- "Entends ce message"
- "Garde ça pour toi"
- "Germaine" (1970, BEL: No. 46)
- "Gondolier" (1958, FR: 10; BEL: No. 1)
- "Guitare et tambourin" (1958, BEL: Tip)
- "Hello, le soleil brille" (1958, FR: 41; BEL: Tip)
- "Hava Naguila (Dansons mon amour)"
- "Il pleut"
- "Il y avait trois jeunes garçons"
- "J'aimerais bien apprendre au monde"
- "J'ai promis à mon amour"
- "Jean le pêcheur"
- "Je crois en toi"
- "Je n'ai qu'un sou"
- "Je reviens chez nous" (1969, FR: 27; BEL: No. 36)
- "Jérusalem en or"
- "Je t'appartiens"
- "Kalinka"
- "La chanson de Lara" (1966, FR: 7; BEL: No. 3)
- "La chanson du célibataire"
- "La chanson pour Anna"
- "La chorale"
- "La complainte du partisan"
- "La Costa Brava" (1965, BEL: Tip)
- "La grande dame"
- "La guerre en dentelles"
- "La guitare et la mer" (1959, FR: 16; BEL: No. 22)
- "La gymnastique"
- "La Java du diable"
- "La Licorne" (1968, FR: 71; BEL: Tip)
- "La longue marche"
- "La mamma" (1963, FR: 80; BEL: No. 46)
- "La marche de Sacco et Vanzetti"
- "La marche des anges" (1961, FR: 1; BEL: No. 9)
- "La Marie (Le Gars Pierre)"
- "La Marie Joconde"
- "La marmite" (1961, FR: No. 19; BEL: No. 24)
- "La mouche"
- "L'amour est bleu"
- "Là où finit le ciel"
- "La petite Julie" (1969, FR: 38; BEL: No. 34)
- "La prière" (1956, FR: No. 35)
- "L'arlequin de Tolède" (1960, FR: 3; BEL: No. 19)
- "La semaine"
- "La valse des lilas"
- "Le bleu de l'été" (1960, FR: 3; BEL: No. 3)
- "Le Chant de Mallory" (1964, BEL: No. 45)
- "Le clown et l'enfant triste"
- "Le cœur en bandoulière" ("Lost Patrol") (1962, FR: 20; BEL: No. 39)
- "Le cœur en fête" (1971, FR: 49; BEL: No. 33)
- "Le galérien"
- "Légende indienne"
- "Le jour où la pluie viendra"
- "Le loup-garou"
- "Le marchand de bonheur" (1959, FR: 1; BEL: No. 8)
- "L'enfant au cœur d'or"
- "L'enfant aux cymbales"
- "L'enfant de Bohème" (1962, FR: 70; BEL: Tip)
- "Le premier matin"
- "Le prisonnier"
- "Le prisonnier de la tour"
- "Le roi a fait battre tambour"
- "Le roi Dagobert"
- "Les aventuriers" (1963, FR: 2; BEL: No. 46)
- "Les Bohémiens" (1966, BEL: Tip)
- "Les cavaliers du ciel"
- "Les comédiens" (1962, FR: 19; BEL: No. 13)
- "Les couleurs du temps"
- "Les Épouvantails"
- "Les Feuilles mortes"
- "Les Gitans"
- "Le sous-marin vert" (1966, BEL: No. 15)
- "Les petits cochons"
- "Les petits musiciens des marchés Mexicains"
- "Les souliers" (1965, BEL: Tip)
- "Les Trois Cloches"
- "Les vertes années"
- "Les Yeux de ma mère"
- "Le temps des étudiants"
- "Le Toit de sa maison"
- "Lettre à Virginie"
- "Le violon de tante Estelle"
- "L'Homme qui se rappelle"
- "L'Objet"
- "L'Ours"
- "Maître Pierre"
- "Margoton va t'à l'iau"
- "Maria, souviens-toi" (1967, BEL: Tip)
- "Marianne" (1957, FR: 13; BEL: No. 3)
- "Marie du bord de l'eau" (1965, BEL: Tip)
- "Marin (Enfant du voyage)" (1961, FR: No. 7; BEL: No. 11)
- "Ma terre"
- "Mélodie perdue" (1958, FR: 43; BEL: Tip)
- "Merci Satchmo !" (1971, BEL: No. 38)
- "Mes jeunes années"
- "Moisson (La terre est basse)" (1957, FR: 26; BEL: Tip)
- "Mona Lisa"
- "Mon ami, mon ami"
- "Mon bateau"
- "Mon Espagnole"
- "Moulin-Rouge"
- "Nathalie s'en va"
- "Navarone" (1961, FR: 20; BEL: No. 9)
- "Ne pleure pas, Jeannette"
- "Nick, Nack Paddy Whack (La Marche des gosses)" (1959, FR: 5; BEL: No. 5)
- "Noël blanc" (1966, BEL: Tp)
- "Notre concerto" (1960, BEL: No. 13)
- "N'oubliez pas ma chanson"
- "Parle plus bas"
- "Pauvre pêcheur"
- "Peggy O"
- "Perrine était servante"
- "Piano piano"
- "Pigalle"
- "Quand la mer monte" (1969, FR: 23; BEL: No. 44)
- "Quand on s'a, quand on s'aime"
- "Que c'est triste Venise"
- "Quel mazzolin di fiori"
- "Quelque part… deux amants"
- "Qu'il est difficile d'aimer (Le doux chagrin)" (1965, BEL: Tip)
- "Qu'il fait bon vivre" ("Down by the Riverside") (1960, FR: 6; BEL: No. 20)
- "Retour"
- "Roméo" (1961, BEL: No. 1)
- "Ronde mexicaine" (1960, FR: 6; BEL: No. 37)
- "Ronde, ronde, ronde" (1958, FR: 44; BEL: Tip)
- "Rose d'or" (1958, FR: 35; BEL: Tip)
- "Sa jeunesse"
- "Sarah" (1958, FR: 9; BEL: No. 27)
- "Schwabadaba ding ding" (1971, FR: 56; BEL: No. 26)
- "Si jamais"
- "Si j'avais des millions" (1968, FR: 27; BEL: No. 49)
- "Si tous les gars du monde" (1956, FR: 28, BEL: Tip)
- "Si tous les oiseaux" (1960, FR: 25; BEL: Top)
- "Si tu vas à Rio" (1958, BEL: No. 2)
- "Sur la mort d'une cousine de sept ans"
- "Sur ma vie" (1956, FR: No. 39)
- "Telstar (Une étoile en plein jour)" (1962, FR: 5; BEL: No. 6)
- "Tom Dooley (Fais ta prière)" (1959, FR: 4; BEL: No. 1)
- "Tourbillon"
- "Trop beau pour être vrai"
- "Trop tard" (1962, FR: 87; BEL: No. 39)
- "Tumbalala"
- "Tzeinerlin" (1970, BEL: No. 36)
- "Un amour pleurait"
- "Un dimanche"
- "Une enfant"
- "Un jour ou l'autre"
- "Un Mexicain" (1962, FR: 2; BEL: No. 4)
- "Un monde entier"
- "Un violon sur le toit" (1968, FR: 64; BEL: Tip)
- "Vénus, mon amie" (1959, BEL: No. 1)
- "Verte campagne" (1960, FR: 2; BEL: No. 3)
- "Viens, viens"
- "Welcome l'ami"
- "Y'aura toujours" (1962, FR: 59; BEL: Tip)

Charts sources:
