= Burn (Tina Arena song) =

1997 single by Tina Arena

Single by Tina Arena

from the album In Deep
- B-side: "Stay"
- Released: 14 July 1997
- Length: 4:41
- Label: Columbia
- Songwriters: Tina Arena; Pam Reswick; Steve Werfel
- Producer: Mick Jones

Tina Arena singles chronology
"Show Me Heaven" (1995)	"Burn" (1997)	"If I Didn't Love You" (1997)

Music video
- "Burn" on YouTube

"Burn" is a song written by Tina Arena, Pam Reswick, and Steve Werfel for Arena's third album, In Deep (1997). The song gave Arena her highest-charting hit in her native Australia, reaching number two on the ARIA Singles Chart. At the time of its release, "Burn" was Australia's fastest-added single to radio. Arena also recorded the song in Italian, titled "Ti voglio qui". It was released as a single in several European countries.

In 2000, "Burn" was covered by American country music singer Jo Dee Messina and her version reached number two on the US Billboard Hot Country Singles & Tracks chart.

== Critical reception ==
A reviewer from Billboard magazine described "Burn" as a "beautiful love song", adding that Arena "has glorious pipes, a charismatic presence, and the song-writing savvy of a lifelong hitmaker." Sunday Mirror commented, "She's got a huge pair of lungs for a tiny lass, and this power ballad fair simmers."

== Music video ==
A music video was made to accompany the song. It was directed by Pierre Baroni. In the beginning, Arena is seen performing surrounded by water. Later, the singer performs towards a blue heaven with skies. In between, there are black-and-white clips, depicting different people in different ages.

== "Ti voglio qui" ==
"Ti voglio qui" is the Italian version of "Burn", translated by Fabrizio V Zee Grossi. As an alternate-language version of a hit single, this release lacked substantial mainstream appeal and therefore failed to make any significant commercial impact. Despite being released at the same time, the two songs are often credited as the first and second singles from the In Deep album. It is credited as a single released from this album due to its connection to "Burn" and the two songs' simultaneous releases, despite being a non-album track. This quickly made its limited CD single a highly sought-after collector's item, as it was the only way to obtain this song until it was re-released on the limited edition 2CD version of the Greatest Hits 1994-2004 album. The song can still be purchased from a number of Australian legal music download services.

== Track listings ==
Australian CD single

1. "Burn" – 4:24
2. "Stay" – 4:25
3. "Burn" (acoustic version) – 5:33

UK CD single 1

1. "Burn" – 4:20
2. "Heaven Help My Heart" (live) – 5:47
3. "I Want to Spend My Lifetime Loving You" (with Marc Anthony) – 4:41

UK CD single 2

1. "Burn" – 4:20
2. "Burn" (Burn the Candle at Both Ends Remix single edit) – 4:25
3. "Burn" (Burn the Candle at Both Ends Remix) – 10:11

"Ti voglio qui"

1. "Ti voglio qui" – 4:25
2. "Stay" – 4:25
3. "Burn" – 4:24
4. "Burn" (version acoustica) – 5:33

== Charts ==
=== Weekly charts ===
Chart (1997–1999)	Peak position
Australia (ARIA)	2
New Zealand (Recorded Music NZ)	36
Scottish Singles Sales (Official Charts)	42
UK Singles (Official Charts)	47

=== Year-end charts ===
Chart (1997)	Position
Australia (ARIA)	41

== Certifications ==
Region	Certification	Certified units/sales
Australia (ARIA)	Platinum	70,000^{‡}
^{‡} Sales+streaming figures based on certification alone.

== Jo Dee Messina version ==
"Burn"

Single by Jo Dee Messina

from the album Burn
- Released: 9 October 2000
- Length: 4:39
- Label: Curb
- Songwriters: Tina Arena; Pam Reswick; Steve Werfel
- Producers: Byron Gallimore; Tim McGraw

Jo Dee Messina singles chronology
"That's the Way" (2000)	"Burn" (2000)	"Downtime" (2001)

Music video
- "Burn" at CMT.com

"Burn" was covered by American country singer Jo Dee Messina for her third studio album Burn. It was released as the second single in October 2000, and peaked at number two on the US Billboard Hot Country Singles & Tracks chart in February 2001.

=== Music video ===
A music video was released for the song directed by Thom Oliphant. The video follows a medieval theme, with scenes of people dressed in renaissance garb. Messina is shown singing the song with a castle in the background, inside a room of the castle, and sitting on the ground. During parts of the chorus, Messina is standing inside of a cloud of fire. The video was filmed at Boldt Castle, located in the Thousand Islands region of New York.

=== Track listing ===
Scandinavian CD single (CUBC62)

1. "Burn"
2. "If Not You"

=== Charts ===
Chart (2000–2001)	Peak position
Canada Country Singles (RPM)	49 (Note: "Burn" had not yet peaked when RPM ceased publication in November 2000.)
US Billboard Hot 100	42
US Adult Contemporary (Billboard)	17
US Hot Country Songs (Billboard)	2

==== Year-end charts ====
Chart (2001)	Position
US Hot Country Singles & Tracks (Billboard)	21

=== Release history ===
Release dates and format(s) for "Burn"
Region	Date	Format(s)	Label(s)	Ref.
United States	9 October 2000	Country radio	Curb	
Scandinavia	2000	CD	Curb	
United States	May 2001	Adult contemporary radio	Curb	
