= Now I Can Dance =

1998 single by Tina Arena

Single by Tina Arena

from the album In Deep
- Released: April 1998
- Studio: Capitol Records (Los Angeles)
- Length: 4:06
- Label: Columbia
- Songwriters: Tina Arena, David Tyson
- Producer: David Tyson

Tina Arena singles chronology
"If I Didn't Love You" (1997)	"Now I Can Dance" (1998)	"Whistle Down the Wind" (1998)

"Now I Can Dance" is a song written by Tina Arena and David Tyson. It was the third single taken from Arena's third studio album, In Deep (1997). It was written by Arena while she was living in Los Angeles and is a love letter from her to her family, as she explained in her autobiography. The song was successful in her native Australia, reaching number 13 on the ARIA Singles Chart.

Now I Can Dance is also the title of Tina Arena's memoir released in October 2013. In 2017, Arena updated her autobiography with the release of a new edition of Now I Can Dance, with new content covering her relocation from France back to Australia, being inducted into the 2015 ARIA Hall of Fame, the release of new music, and new musical ventures.

== Music video ==
The video is set against a white backdrop with Arena auditioning various people for an unspecified role. Singer Charo makes a cameo in the video, playing a guitar solo.

== Track listing ==
Australian maxi-CD single digipak

1. "Now I Can Dance" (single edit)
2. "Now I Can Dance" (urban radio mix)
3. "Now I Can Dance" (Pee Wee's 7-inch dance mix)
4. "Now I Can Dance" (Paul's Bumpy Train Ride mix)
5. "Now I Can Dance" (The Endorphin mix)

== Charts ==
=== Weekly charts ===
Chart (1998)	Peak position
Australia (ARIA)	13

=== Year-end charts ===
Chart (1998)	Position
Australia (ARIA)	92

== Certifications ==
Region	Certification	Certified units/sales
Australia (ARIA)	Gold	35,000^{‡}
^{‡} Sales+streaming figures based on certification alone.
