= Aller plus haut =

Single by Tina Arena

from the album In Deep
- B-side: "Now I Can Dance"
- Released: 9 July 1999
- Genre: Pop
- Length: 4:00
- Label: Columbia, Sony Music
- Songwriter: J. Kapler
- Producers: Christophe Battaglia, J. Kapler

Tina Arena singles chronology
"If I Was a River" (1998)	"Aller plus haut" (1999)	"Les trois cloches" (2000)

"Aller plus haut" (English: "Go Higher") is a 1999 song recorded by Australian singer Tina Arena. It was the eighth single from the album In Deep and was released in July 1999. It was also Arena's first French language single. J. Kapler was inspired to write the song and offer it to Arena after seeing her perform in English on French television. The song became a huge hit in Belgium (Wallonia) where it topped the chart for one week and remained in the top 40 for 21 weeks, and in France, where it charted for 40 weeks and peaked at number two for six consecutive weeks. The song was also included on Arena's best of Souvenirs, Greatest Hits 1994–2004 and The Best & le meilleur. A live version of the song is available on Vous êtes toujours là.

"Aller plus haut" was covered in 2001 by Lara Fabian, Daniel Lévi and Roch Voisine on Les Enfoirés' album L'Odyssée des Enfoirés. In 2005, Arena recorded a new version as a duet with Les 500 Choristes for the album 500 Choristes – avec..., which appears on the CD maxi for "Aimer jusqu'à l'impossible".

== Track listings ==
CD single

1. "Aller plus haut" – 4:00
2. "Now I Can Dance" (live) – 5:53

7" single

1. "Aller plus haut" – 4:00 (A- and B-side identical)

== Charts ==
=== Weekly charts ===
Weekly chart performance
Chart (1999)	Peak position
Belgium (Ultratop 50 Wallonia)	1
European Hot 100 Singles	12
France (SNEP)	2
Switzerland (Schweizer Hitparade)	96

=== Year-end charts ===
1999 year-end chart performance
Chart (1999)	Position
Belgium (Ultratop 50 Wallonia)	38
Europe (Eurochart Hot 100)	42
France (SNEP)	10

2000 year-end chart performance
Chart (2000)	Position
Belgium (Ultratop 50 Wallonia)	67

== Certifications ==
Certifications for "Aller plus haut"
Region	Certification	Certified units/sales
France (SNEP)	Platinum	500,000^{*}
^{*} Sales figures based on certification alone.
