= If I Didn't Love You (Tina Arena song) =

1997 single by Tina Arena

Single by Tina Arena

from the album In Deep
- B-side: "Any Other Love"
- Released: 3 November 1997
- Length: 5:02
- Label: Columbia
- Songwriters: Tina Arena; Pam Reswick; Steve Werfel
- Producer: Mick Jones

Tina Arena singles chronology
"Burn" (1997)	"If I Didn't Love You" (1997)	"Now I Can Dance" (1998)

"If I Didn't Love You" is a song written by Tina Arena, Pam Reswick and Steve Werfel, released as the second single released from Arena's third studio album, In Deep (1997), in November 1997. The song reached number 41 on the Australian ARIA Singles Chart. It was later included as track 11 on Arena's 2004 Greatest Hits compilation. This song is written in the key of G.

== Track listing ==
Australian CD single

1. "If I Didn't Love You"
2. "Any Other Love"
3. "Burn" (the T & G Burn the Candle at Both Ends dub remix)

== Charts ==
Chart (1997)	Peak position
Australia (ARIA)	41
