= Les Trois Cloches =

Swiss song written in French by Jean Villard

Single by Edith Piaf & Les Compagnons de la chanson
- Released: 1946
- Recorded: July 1946
- Genre: Folk, chanson
- Length: 4:08
- Label: Columbia
- Songwriter: Jean Villard

"Les Trois Cloches" (French pronunciation: [le tʁwɑ klɔʃ]) is a Swiss song written in French by Jean Villard. Edith Piaf recorded the song a cappella with the French vocal group Les Compagnons de la chanson in July 1946. The song became one of Édith Piaf's biggest hits, and when Piaf toured the US with Les Compagnons de la chanson, they introduced this song to an American audience. Tina Arena also recorded a hit version in 2000.

The song has also been recorded in many other languages. It was recorded by the Browns in 1959 in English as "The Three Bells" (with words adapted by Bert Reisfeld)." Another English version titled "While the Angelus Was Ringing" was recorded by Frank Sinatra. Lys Assia and Wolfgang Sauer both had a hit version in Germany titled "Wenn Die Glocken Hell Erklingen" in 1959. Dutch singer/comedian André van Duin had a Dutch Top 40 number one hit in 1982 with his Dutch comedy version of the song titled "Bim bam".

== Background ==
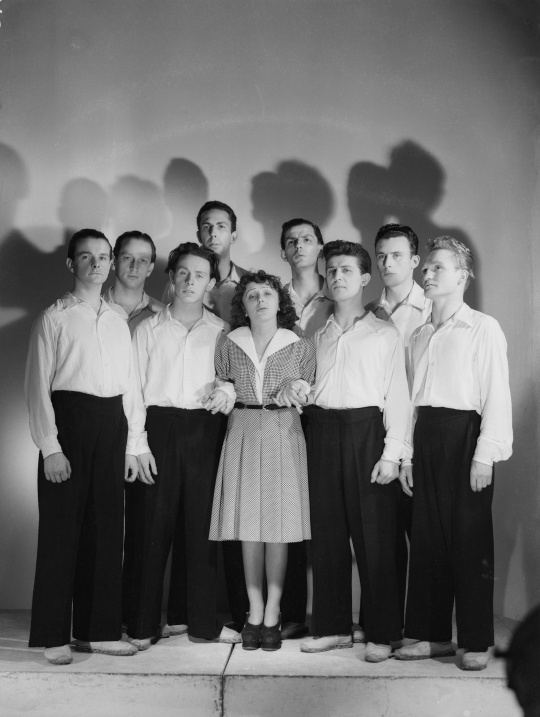
Édith Piaf and Les Compagnons de la chanson in 1946

The song was writtenin 1945 by Swiss songwriter Jean Villard, also known as Gilles, in the folk idiom. He was an acquaintance of Edith Piaf and had performed with her before, and when Piaf went to Lausanne in 1945, he offered the song to her. The song narrates the life of someone named Jean-François Nicot who lived in a small village at the bottom a valley, starting with his birth, followed by his marriage to Élise and ending with his death, events all marked by ringing of the church bells.

Piaf suggested that the French vocal group Les Compagnons de la chanson perform the song, which the group rejected until Piaf proposed singing with them. Les Compagnons performed traditional folk songs in close harmony, and Piaf, who first met the group in 1944, became interested in promoting their career. They started performing together after WWII in 1946, an unexpected collaboration because they came from different musical traditions. They performed "Les Trois Cloches" on 11 May 1946 at the Club des Cinq. Jean Cocteau who was in attendance at their show wrote of them: "The miracle has happened that these two solitudes joined together to create a sound artefact which so expresses France that the tears start to flow."

Piaf and Les Compagnons recorded the song a cappella with an arrangement by group member Marc Herrand in July 1946. The tenor of the group Fred Mella started with the verses while Piaf sang the chorus. Piaf performed the song in the 1948 film Neuf Garçons, un cœur.

Piaf and Les Compagnons went to New York in October 1947, where they introduced the song to an American audience. Two versions with English lyrics were then created: "The Three Bells" and "While the Angelus Was Ringing". Les Compagnons later recorded "The Three Bells" without Piaf, and it reached No. 14 in the United States in 1952, although the Browns had a greater hit with the song in 1959 (No. 1 in Canada for three weeks). Other versions in other languages were also produced.

== Tina Arena version ==
"Les 3 Cloches"

Single by Tina Arena

from the album In Deep
- Released: January 21, 2000
- Genre: Pop
- Length: 3:50
- Label: Sony
- Songwriter: Jean Villard
- Producers: Christophe Battaglia, J. Kapler

Tina Arena singles chronology
| "Aller plus haut" (1999) | "Les 3 Cloches" (2000) | "Live for the One I Love" (2000) |

Australian singer Tina Arena released her version of the song as a single from her 1997 album In Deep. The song became a huge hit in Belgium (Wallonia) where it topped the chart for three weeks and remained in the top 40 for 20 weeks, and in France, where it charted in the top ten for 13 weeks and peaked at number 4 for 2 weeks. The single was certified gold by the SNEP. The single version was different from the album version in that it featured only two of the three original verses, omitting the last one.

=== Track listing ===
1. "Les Trois Cloches" – 3:50
2. "Burn" (version acoustique) – 5:34

=== Weekly charts ===
| Chart (2000) | Peak position |
|---|---|
| Belgium (Ultratop 50 Wallonia) | 1 |
| European Hot 100 Singles | 15 |
| France (SNEP) | 4 |
| Switzerland (Schweizer Hitparade) | 49 |

==== Year-end charts ====
| Chart (2000) | Position |
|---|---|
| Belgian (Wallonia) Singles Chart | 17 |
| French Singles Chart | 28 |

==== Certifications ====
| Region | Certification | Certified units/sales |
|---|---|---|
| France (SNEP) | Gold | 250,000^{*} |
^{*} Sales figures based on certification alone.

== Other versions ==
- The Browns went to the top of the charts with "The Three Bells" in the United States, in 1959.
- Swiss singer Lys Assia recorded a German version titled "Wenn Die Glocken Hell Erklingen" in 1959. The song reached No. 7 in Germany. Another version by Wolfgang Sauer also reached No. 7 in Germany.
- Esther & Abi Ofarim recorded the song for their album That's Our Song (1965). It was released as a single on Philips Records.
- Ray Charles recorded "The Three Bells" for Volcanic Action Of My Soul, an album released in 1971.
- Ken Parker, a Jamaican singer, recorded a rocksteady version of "The Three Bells" under the title "Jimmy Brown" in 1972.
- Ben Keith recorded an instrumental version for Seven Gates: A Christmas Album by Ben Keith and Friends in 1994. The album was reissued in 2008 under the title "Christmas at the Ranch" but with a new recording of the song with vocal by Neil Young and Pegi Young, which also appeared two years later on the Christmas album Gift Wrapped II: Snowed In (2010).
- Ehud Manor translated the song into Hebrew, and it was sung by Tunisian-Israeli singer Corinne Allal on her 1990 album Sfat Immi ("my mother's tongue").
- André van Duin recorded a comedy version in Dutch, title "Bim Bam", and released together with "Als Je Huilt". The single reached No. 1 on the Dutch Top 40 chart in 1982. It also reached No. 84 in the Dutch Top 100 chart in 2001.

== See also ==
- The Three Bells
- While the Angelus Was Ringing
