= Albert Urfer =

Swiss pianist and chansonnier (1914–1985)

Albert Urfer was a pianist and chansonnier, born on 26 October 1914 in Vevey (Switzerland), died in Lausanne, on 29 October 1985.

== Biography ==
He started playing piano at a very early age, whilst being also interested in the choral art. Mobilised in the Swiss Army during the World War II, he directed a small military band. Between 1945 and 1951 he played in Geneva, Gstaad, Vevey, Bâle, and even in Cairo.

In 1953 he went to Paris and stayed there till 1956, to learn Dramatic arts with Mady Berry. He acted for the theatre, cinema and television. He came back to Switzerland to play at the “Centre dramatique romand” in the French version of Twelve Angry Men, a play by Reginald Rose.

However, he became well known and is best remembered as the partner and musical assistant to the chansonnier Jean Villard for an ongoing 25 years. He replaced Edith Burger, in 1948.

== Bibliography ==
- A. Urfer, Qui va piano..., 1978
