= Tina Arena =

Australian singer-songwriter (born 1967)

Tina Arena AM
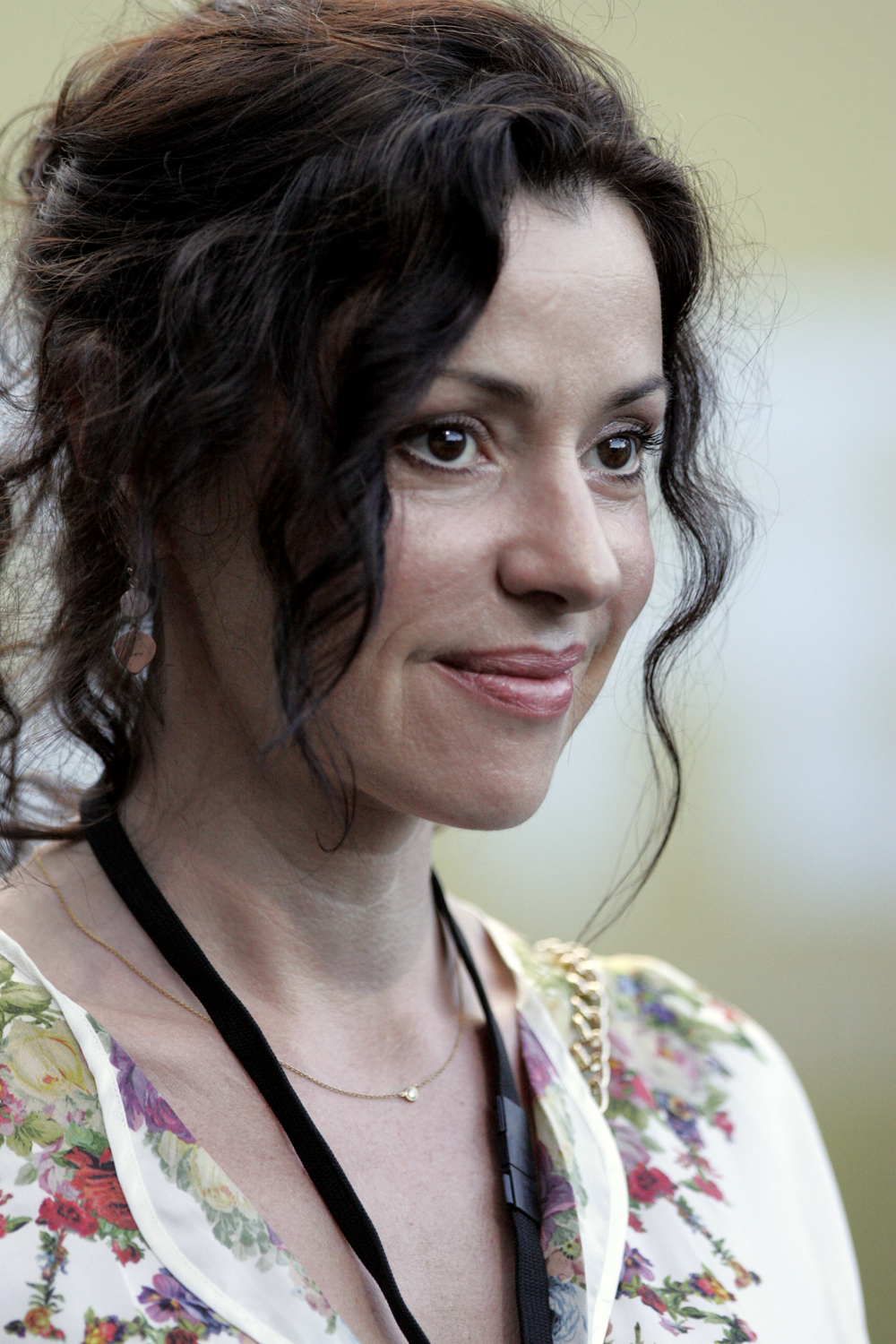
- Arena in 2013
- Born: Filippina Lydia Arena; 1 November 1967 (age 59); Melbourne, Victoria, Australia
- Occupations: Singer-songwriter; recording artist; record producer; musician; musical theatre actress; author; television personality
- Years active: 1976–present
- Musical career
- Genres: Pop; dance-pop; R&B
- Instruments: Vocals; piano
- Labels: Columbia; EMI Australia; Sony BMG; Positive Dream
- Website: www.tinaarena.com

Filippina Lydia "Tina" Arena (born 1 November 1967) is an Australian singer-songwriter, musician, musical theatre actress and record producer. She is one of Australia's highest-selling artists and has sold over 11 million records worldwide. Arena is multilingual, singing and recording in English, Italian, French and Spanish.

Arena has earned several international and national awards, including a BRIT Award, seven ARIA Awards and two World Music Awards for Best-selling Australian Artist (1996, 2000). In 2001, she was awarded a BMI Foundation Songwriting Award (Broadcast Music Inc) by the American performance rights organisation for co-writing "Burn" with Pam Reswick and Steve Werfel. In 2011, Arena became the first Australian to be awarded a knighthood of the French National Order of Merit, presented by the President of the French Republic, Nicolas Sarkozy, for her contributions to French culture, and ceremonially awarded by Frédéric Mitterrand, the Minister of Culture and Communication of France.

In 2015, Arena was inducted into the Australian Recording Industry Association ARIA Hall of Fame. On Australia Day, 26 January 2016, Arena was recognised in the Australia Day Honours and appointed a member in the General Division of the Order of Australia "for significant service to the music industry as a singer, songwriter, and recording artist, and as a supporter of charitable groups". In 2016 Arena was appointed as a Member of the Order of Australia (AM).

In March 2019, the Government of Australia appointed Arena as a board member of the Australia Council for the Arts for a three-year term.

== Early life and career beginnings ==
Arena was born in the Melbourne suburb of Keilor East, to Giuseppe "Joe" Arena and Francesca "Franca" Catalfamo (both from Valguarnera, Sicily), Sicilian immigrants, in Melbourne on 1 November 1967. Giuseppe was a rural worker in Sicily and then a cane cutter in Cairns in 1955. By the following year he was a labourer in Melbourne and later worked for Victorian Railways. Arena grew up in Keilor East with two sisters, Nancy and Silvana; As a child, she listened to Spanish, Italian and French songs that were in her family's record collection. At the age of six, she was the flower girl at her cousin Gaetano's wedding, and at the reception she urged her father to approach the host so that she could sing—Daryl Braithwaite's version of "You're My World"—it was her first public performance.

Arena's family call her Pina, which is her shortened first name. She changed her first name from Filippina to Tina, her stage name becoming Tina Arena, when she appeared as a child performer on the national television talent show Young Talent Time in 1976, at age 8. For secondary schooling, she attended a Catholic girls' college, St. Columba's College, Essendon, in Melbourne. Recalling her upbringing, Arena says, "It was a very Italian household, it was a very traditional household. There was a lot of love but there was a lot of discipline. And there was no room for pretentiousness. Really, there just wasn't."

=== Young Talent Time years ===
Arena received singing lessons from Voila Ritchie who recommended her to appear on a television talent quest and variety show, Young Talent Time, an Australian weekly television variety program produced by Lewis-Young Productions and screened on Network Ten.

When Arena was selected to appear on Young Talent Time in 1974, the producers at Lewis-Young Productions and Network Ten asked her to change her first name from Filippina to "Tina"—creating her stage name, "Tina Arena"—so as to be more relatable to the wider national audience. In the mid-1970s, there was a minority of ethnic diversity represented in the Australian mainstream media, especially on primetime television. Initially appearing as a Young Talent Time contestant in 1974, Arena went on to permanently join the cast as a regular member of the show's Young Talent Team in 1976. She then quickly, and affectionately, became known on the show by her nickname "Tiny Tina". For her first appearance she performed ABBA's "Ring Ring".

As a core member of the Young Talent Team performing live on Australian national television each week, Arena sang cover versions of popular music tracks. In 1977, she released a split album, Tiny Tina and Little John, alternating tracks with fellow Young Talent Team member, John Bowles.

As a member of the Young Talent Team, Arena appeared in TV specials, in TV commercials, at shopping centres and on tourist venues. In September 1982, she became a "coach" for new team members, Danielle Minogue and Mark McCormack; Arena told The Australian Women's Weekly's Debbie Byrne that "They seem to be settling down a lot quicker than I did. They both have a really professional attitude." At 14, she told Byrne "my aim: to be a recording artist and actress but, now, I have to concentrate simply on what I'm doing and that can take enough effort."

Arena left the Young Talent Time show in October 1983, ahead of her 16th birthday, due to the Network Ten Young Talent Time series age-limit contract stipulation to give way for younger members. Arena performed the songs "The Way We Were" and "MacArthur Park" for her finale set on her farewell Young Talent Time episode. Arena starred in Young Talent Time from 1976 to 1983—making her the show's longest-serving cast member.

Arena completed her Higher School Certificate (final year of secondary school) and was hired as an insurance clerk; however, she resigned after three months to pursue a music career.

Speaking at her BIGSOUND keynote address in 2017, Arena described her childhood to teenage experience on Young Talent Time as an inclusive apprenticeship into the television light-entertainment and musical industry in Australia, Arena noted:

It was 40 years ago and there were no ethnic faces on [Australian] television. It was an extraordinary apprenticeship. Young Talent Time was inclusive and welcoming. The only downside of Young Talent Time was when I was trying to transition to an adult.

== Career ==
=== Starting a solo recording career ===
At age 17, Arena signed a record deal with Graffiti Records, which released her debut single, "Turn Up the Beat", in 1985. Australian musicologist, Ian McFarlane, described it as having a "dance-pop" style. The Sydney Morning Herald's Tim Elliott said that it "failed to impress". It had been recorded in the previous year with Brian Cadd producing at Flagstaff Studios in Melbourne. When the single did not appear in the top 50 her planned album was scrapped.

Following her 1985 recording, Arena sang advertising jingles and worked on the pub and club circuit to earn a living. She performed solo shows and in bands, including as a member of a nine-piece ensemble, Network. She also appeared in musicals. In 1987, she supported American artist Lionel Richie on his Australian tour following a number of charity performances.

=== 1988–1993: Debut solo album – Strong as Steel ===
During 1988, Arena appeared as a guest on Australian TV shows recalling her tenure on Young Talent Time and looking for a new record label. In 1990, she had a singing and dancing role in the David Atkins' musical, Dynamite, for a 10-month run. Also that year she signed with EMI and reinvented her image as a raunchy disco diva. In April she issued a single, "I Need Your Body", which peaked at No. 3 on the ARIA Singles Chart. McFarlane described it as "uptempo" with the associated music video "projecting a raunchy disco-diva persona ... flaunting a pouting rock starlet with bouncing cleavage and attitude to burn." Australian journalist Ed Nimmervoll noticed that she used "raunchy videos showing off her cleavage as if to prove she was a woman now."

The artist followed with another single, "The Machine's Breaking Down", in July 1990, which peaked in the top 30. Her debut solo album, Strong as Steel, was released in October, and peaked at number 17 on the ARIA Albums Chart. Most of the album was produced by Ross Inglis. Penelope Layland of The Canberra Times opined that "the frantic single, 'I Need Your Body', is quite uncharacteristic of much of the music on Tina Arena's album, Strong As Steel. In fact, it is one of the weakest tracks on an album which bounces with potential pop hits."

According to music historian Ed Nimmervoll, Arena "was not comfortable. This was not her. This was not what she wanted to be for the rest of her life. Tina went into seclusion while she decided what to do next, moving to Los Angeles to be a nobody again." She relocated to LA in 1991, where she took more singing lessons and started songwriting. Upon return to Australia, in 1993, she performed in the local December 1992 to February 1993 musical theatre production, Joseph and the Amazing Technicolor Dreamcoat, as the Narrator, at the State Theatre, Melbourne. In 1992 Arena sang background vocals on the debut album by Australian singer-songwriter Rick Price, titled Heaven Knows, which was released in July 1992, and she appeared in the 1993 music video by Price for the single "A House Divided".

=== 1994–1996: Second solo album – Don't Ask ===
Arena's second solo studio album, Don't Ask, was released on 14 November 1994. It was produced by David Tyson for Columbia Records. According to Nimmervoll, during recording "Tina nearly broke down. This was an all-important moment in her career." Arena co-wrote all 10 tracks of the original Australian version.

Ian McFarlane noticed it demonstrated a "more mature, sophisticated, soul-tinged style and approach ... [and] her powerful, crystal clear voice more than adequately matched the material on offer." Kelvin Hayes of AllMusic felt that "a lot of Don't Ask remains twee. However, there are good moments." It peaked at No. 1 on the ARIA Albums Chart—a year after its release—and remained in the top 50 for 83 weeks. It reached No. 11 on the UK Albums Chart and No. 12 in New Zealand.

Don't Ask was the highest-selling album of 1995 in Australia and one of the biggest-selling albums by an Australian female singer to date. It has sold over two million copies worldwide and was certified 10 times platinum by ARIA in 2011 for shipment of over 700,000 copies in that country alone. The success of the record made her a priority artist for Sony, who marketed her in the US. Her European success was realised: Don't Ask charted in Germany, Sweden and Switzerland.

The lead single, "Chains", was issued ahead of the album in August 1994 and peaked at No. 4 on the ARIA Singles Chart. It also reached No. 6 in the UK, No. 7 in New Zealand, No. 9 in Ireland, No. 38 in the U.S., and No. 20 in Canada. In 1995, she toured Europe, appearing on Top of the Pops which broadcast to an audience of 60 million people. In the European market, Arena was an unknown and a fresh commodity, and she enjoyed being new to people instead of being thought of in terms of her Young Talent Time career. Five additional singles were released, "Sorrento Moon (I Remember)" (January 1995), "Heaven Help My Heart" (May), "Wasn't It Good" (September), "Show Me Heaven" (November) and "That's the Way a Woman Feels" (February 1996).

At the ARIA Music Awards of 1995, Arena was nominated in six categories and won four trophies: Best Pop Release and Song of the Year for "Chains"; and Album of the Year and Best Female Artist for Don't Ask. At the 1996 ceremony she received five more nominations and won Highest Selling Album for Don't Ask. Other accolades she earned were Variety Club Entertainer of the Year, an Advance Australia Foundation award, and a World Music Award.

=== 1997–2000: In Deep and the 2000 Sydney Olympic Games ===
Arena relocated to Los Angeles in 1996 and 1997, to record her third solo studio album, In Deep (18 August 1997), which became her second number-one album in Australia. For the Australian version of the album Arena co-wrote eleven of its twelve tracks—her fellow writers include Mick Jones (of Foreigner), David Tyson, Christopher Ward, Dean McTaggart, Pam Reswick and Steve Werfel. The album included her cover version of Foreigner's "I Want to Know What Love Is", originally written by Jones who produced Arena's version. In Deep "was recorded predominantly live in the studio in an attempt to bring the material closer to Tina's stage performance persona" with four tracks produced by Tyson and the rest by Jones. In Deep was certified 3× platinum in Australia. William Ruhlmann of AllMusic found the US version of the album showed that "Her own songs, co-written with a team of others, are perfectly good contemporary pop/rock, and she sings them with passionate commitment" and it was "brimming with potential hit singles (it spawned three in Australia)."

In Deep, in its different versions, provided ten singles, with the lead one, "Burn", appearing in July 1997, which had some US airplay. The track was co-written by Arena with Reswick and Werfel. In Australia it debuted at No. 2 and was certified gold upon its release. It was also a hit in Asia. Besides the English-language version she also recorded it in Spanish and Italian (in the form of "Ti Voglio Qui"). The second single, "If I Didn't Love You" (November) appeared in the ARIA top 50. In April of the following year she issued "Now I Can Dance", which peaked at No. 13. In the UK Arena released "Whistle Down the Wind" (June 1998) as a cover version single, it was the title track from the 1996 musical of the same name, her version reached the UK Singles Chart top 30.

In April 1998, Arena performed at the 50th birthday celebration for Andrew Lloyd Webber at the Royal Albert Hall in London. Arena performed at the celebration, along with John Farnham, and featured musical performances by Elaine Paige.

Arena's duet with US artist, Marc Anthony, "I Want to Spend My Lifetime Loving You", from the feature film soundtrack for The Mask of Zorro (July 1998), gained her European chart success. The track was issued as a non-album single in Australia in September, but did not reach the top 50. It was included on the French release version of In Deep, appearing in October, which peaked at No. 3 on the French Albums Chart—a year after its first entry—and spent 88 weeks on that chart. It also reached the top 10 in Belgium and top 40 in Switzerland. It was certified 3× platinum by Syndicat National de l'Édition Phonographique (SNEP) in May 2001 for sales in France. "I Want to Spend My Lifetime Loving You" had been issued in Europe in September 1998, it peaked at No. 3 in France—her first charting single in that market. It also reached No. 3 in the Netherlands and top 10 in Belgium.

Arena toured the US from March 1999, to promote the album's local release, as well as another single, "If I Was a River", which did peak in the UK top 40. Sony attempted to "break" Arena into the US market by the release of "If I Was a River", penned by Diane Warren. Ruhlmann felt the label had an "obvious plan is to turn her into a down-under Celine Dion" however the album and its singles "had no commercial impact upon release in the U.S." and "must be considered a disappointment." Her US foray included appearances on TV shows such as Donny & Marie. In February 1999, she teamed with label-mate Donna Summer to perform a cover version of "No More Tears (Enough Is Enough)"; the duet appeared on Summer's live album, Live & More Encore (June 1999).

Arena's first French-language single, "Aller plus haut" (English: "Go Higher", July 1999), appeared on the continental version of In Deep, which peaked at No. 2 on the local singles chart. It also became her first number-one hit on the Belgian Singles Chart. Her second French-language single was a cover version of "Les trois cloches" (English: "The Three Bells", January 2000), which reached No. 4 in France and another number-one hit in Belgium. From May that year she lived in London while she appeared in the lead role of Esméralda for the stage musical, Notre Dame de Paris during a six-month run. Carr, by now her ex-husband, had claimed in Business Review Weekly (2000) that Arena was paid $200,000 per week when she was performing in Notre Dame de Paris.

Arena sang "The Flame" (written by John Foreman) at the 2000 Opening Ceremony of the Sydney Olympics on 15 September. Seven Network covered the national broadcast across Australia, which become the highest rating TV telecast in Australian history. John Farnham, Olivia Newton-John, Vanessa Amorosi, Human Nature and Julie Anthony were some of the other Australian artists who appeared at the opening ceremony and contributed to the various artists' album, The Games of the XXVII Olympiad: Official Music from the Opening Ceremony (September 2000). She recalled, "When I sang at the Olympics, I cared about the fact that I was Australian. And I was touched because I was an ethnic girl, of ethnic blood but that WAS Australian. Because I was born here, this is where I grew up, this is where I learned everything."

At the ARIA Music Awards of 2000 in October, Arena received an Outstanding Achievement Award. In the following month she issued her first compilation album, Souvenirs, which reached the ARIA top 40.

=== 2001–2007: Just Me, "Never (Past Tense)" and Un autre univers ===
Arena's fourth solo studio album, Just Me, was released on 12 November 2001 and debuted at No. 7 in Australia; it reached the top 50 in France and top 70 in Switzerland. She co-wrote tracks with Nile Rodgers (Madonna, Diana Ross), Desmond Child (Ricky Martin, Aerosmith), Robbie Nevil (Earth, Wind & Fire), Mark Hudson (Eric Clapton, Cher), Victoria Shaw and Peter-John Vettese (Dido, Paul McCartney). The album explored different genres, containing more upbeat tracks as opposed to her two previous studio records which featured her soprano voice on slow pop ballads. Although written after the divorce from Carr, she said that the record is not angry nor bitter but rather a "celebration of womanhood". It was certified gold by ARIA and by SNEP (France).

To promote Just Me she showcased it for 150 people, mostly Australian TV and media personalities, in Melbourne. The record provided four singles including "Symphony of Life" (September 2002), which peaked at No. 8 in Australia and top 50 (as "Symphonie de l'âme") in France. In November 2008 she performed the track at the closing of the Gay Games, when the international sporting event was held in Sydney. She was featured on 2 (November 2002), a duets album from Olivia Newton-John for which the pair recorded an uptempo track, "I'll Come Runnin'".

In March 2002, Arena posed for a semi-nude photo shoot by James Houston for Black+White magazine. She explained, "This shoot isn't about shock value, and it's not porn, it's an elegant, understated and honest exercise in challenging my sexuality and learning to love myself again." She appeared in Cabaret in August that year in Sydney in the lead role of Sally Bowles.

In April 2003, Arena and US electronica group, Roc Project, released a dance music single "Never (Past Tense)", which reached number 1 on the US Billboard Dance Airplay Chart in October 2003. The single included seven house and electronic dance music remixed versions by various DJs. This was the first time three performers associated with Young Talent Time were simultaneously in the chart's Top 10 with Dannii Minogue's "I Begin to Wonder" and Kylie Minogue's "Slow" also appearing on the chart.

"Never (Past Tense)" was used on the US TV series, Queer as Folk, and on its associated soundtrack album (2003). The singer-songwriter performed the Tiësto remix with a new remix of "Dare You to Be Happy" live at the Sydney Gay and Lesbian Mardi Gras after party in March 2005. By 2014 she had performed at the Mardi Gras for a fourth time: she is one of the gay icons of this generation.

In October 2004, Arena released Greatest Hits 1994–2004, her second compilation album, which peaked at No. 10 in Australia. The compilation provided a newly recorded track as a single, "Italian Love Song" (November), which reached the top 40. After its release she left the recording label, striking a new deal with Sony Music BMG, France. She embarked on an Australian national tour in late 2004 to early 2005, to support the album.

Her debut French-language album, Un autre univers was released in December 2005, and gained a platinum certificate from SNEP in February 2006, it peaked at No. 9 on the French charts and remained for 78 weeks.

Un autre univers lead single, "Aimer jusqu'à l'impossible" which peaked at No. 3 on the French charts, in November 2005, and stayed in the top 5 for over 10 weeks. The single was her biggest French hit to date on the French national charts In February 2006, the single achieved platinum sales in France. The single peaked at No. 1 in Belgium and was a top 20 hit in Switzerland. The song received an award for Song of the Year in France. A second single "Je m'appelle Bagdad" was released in June 2006, peaking at No. 6 in France and No. 8 in Belgium. The third and final single from the album, "Tu aurais dû me dire (Oser parler d'amour)" (English: "You Should Have Told Me (Dare to Speak of Love)"), was issued in October.

Arena toured France, including two concerts at the Théâtre de la Porte Saint-Martin in Paris. She performed her French hits and some of her Australian repertoire. In July, she appeared on The Footy Show where she performed, with fellow Australian singer Kane Alexander, direct from Munich's Prince Regent's Theatre.

In 2006, she appeared on various European TV shows to promote the album and has appeared in Night of the Proms, Star Academy, Fête de la Musique, Les Enfoirés and the NRJ Music Awards where she performed her single, "Aimer jusqu'à l'impossible" (English: "Love Even the Impossible", November 2005) backed by her French contemporaries: Anggun, Leslie Bourgoin, Amel Bent, Nâdiya, Lââm and Natasha St-Pier.

=== 2007–2009: Songs of Love and Loss 1 and 2 ===
Arena returned to the London stage in April 2007, starring as Roxie Hart in the West End production of Chicago, at the Cambridge Theatre, West End of London. The Sydney Morning Herald reported that, "Arena is returning to the stage following the birth of her first baby, Gabriel, now aged 13 months. Arena will make her debut at the prestigious Cambridge Theatre in Covent Garden in April playing the infamous murderess who exploits the media to escape prosecution. Arena said she was "excited, if not a little daunted" about playing the role, which means Arena will have to dust off her dancing shoes for toe-tappers such as Razzle Dazzle and All That Jazz."

In 2007, Arena's sixth studio album, Songs of Love & Loss, was recorded independently and self-financed as she no longer had a recording contract in Australia. The album was issued on 1 December 2007 after a new deal was struck with EMI. It has torch songs, originally recorded by women in the 1960s and 1970s, including by Dusty Springfield and Diana Ross, and the arrangements featured a full string orchestra conducted by Simon Hale. A promotional tour of Australia, in early November, included appearances on Dancing with the Stars and Sunrise. Five concert dates backed by a 35-piece orchestra were held over December to January: three at the Sydney Opera House and two at Melbourne's Hamer Hall. The album peaked at No. 3 on the ARIA Albums Chart; at the ARIA Music Awards of 2008 it was nominated for Best Selling Album.

While Arena was promoting Songs of Love & Loss in Australia in 2008, she shot a music video in and around Sydney for her next French-language single, "Entends-tu le monde?" (English: "Do you hear the world?"), was made available to French radio and music TV channels. It appeared on her second French-language album, 7 vies (28 January 2008), which debuted at No. 12 on the official French charts, her highest debut in the country. "Entends-tu le monde?" was physically released in February and debuted at No. 10 on the French charts, becoming her sixth top 10 single in that market.

In August 2008, Arena performed with Andrea Bocelli during his Australian tour. The two performed duets of "The Prayer", "Canto della Terra" and a cover of Elvis Presley's "Can't Help Falling in Love". Prior to the tour she had been in the UK recording her eighth studio album, Songs of Love & Loss 2, it was released on 15 November 2008, and reached No. 12 in Australia. For this album, her vocals were recorded live with the London Studio Orchestra, again conducted by Hale. On 27 August 2008, alongside fellow Australian singer and songwriter Darren Hayes, Arena appeared as a guest judge during the London auditions of the sixth season of Australian Idol. She appeared again as a guest judge, on 16 November, while she was in Australia to promote, Songs of Love & Loss 2.

In March 2009, Arena toured Australia and appeared as a guest performer at the Sydney Gay & Lesbian Mardi Gras party singing a medley of "Aimer jusqu'à l'impossible" and "No More Tears (Enough Is Enough)", accompanied by Alison Jiear on the latter. She travelled to South Australia to co-headline with US musician, Chris Isaak, at Barossa Under the Stars, an outdoors concert. Also in March 2009 her first French-language compilation album, The Best & le meilleur (English: The Best & the best), was released. The Peel Me Sessions, an album of original material recorded in 2003, was also officially released in May 2009.

=== 2010–2011: French National Order of Merit and Tour de France ===
In January 2010, Arena and Irish singer Ronan Keating (of Boyzone) were co-headliners for an outdoor concert festival, A Day on the Green, at Swan Valley. The duo performed tracks from their latest respective albums and were supported by Australian Idol season 4 winner, Damien Leith.

In January 2010, Arena released a live CD and DVD in Australia titled Live: The Onstage Collection The album peaked at No. 22 on the ARIA Albums Chart. The live recording was her eighth Top 10 album on the ARIA Australian-only artist chart and was also promoted and sold during Arena and Keating's concerts.

On 24 July 2011, Arena sang an a cappella performance of Advance Australia Fair on the podium on the Avenue des Champs-Élysées at the Tour de France winner's ceremony after Cadel Evans became the first Australian winner in the tour's history. This was unscheduled and came about because Arena was living in Paris at the time and offered her services only hours before the ceremony. It was the first time in the tour's history that a national anthem was performed live on the podium in front of huge crowds and a broadcast audience of millions.

In 2011, Arena was a judge on the French version of The Sing-Off TV singing competition program, alongside two other judges, French singer Michel Jonasz, and French artistic director of radio and television Nathalie André. The program was broadcast on France 2.

In 2011, Arena became the first Australian to be awarded a knighthood of the French National Order of National Merit, presented by the President of the French Republic, Nicolas Sarkozy, for her contributions to French culture, and ceremonially awarded by Frédéric Mitterrand, the Minister of Culture and Communication of France.

=== 2012: Young Talent Time revival and Australian symphony orchestra tour ===
Arena appeared as a judge on the 2012 version of Young Talent Time in Australia, 29 years after her final regular appearance on the original series. After judging the talent shows, she finished her national Australian tour backed by various Australian symphony orchestras with Anthony Callea as a special guest. Arena detailed working on the tour: "They are precious, those moments where the orchestra swells behind you, they are difficult to describe in words and from an adrenalin perspective it is a sensational feeling." In November 2012, she issued her fourth live album released on CD and DVD, Symphony of Life, recorded at one of her Melbourne concerts. Arena's management is Beebox.

=== 2013–2014: Reset, Now I Can Dance and Dancing with the Stars Australia ===
Due to the success of her Symphony of Life Tour, Arena added five extra shows in Melbourne, Sydney and Canberra for February and March 2013, as part of her Encore Concerts. In July she performed two concerts at the Queensland Music Festival. One of these was a solo show backed by the Queensland Youth Orchestra performing her own hits and covers; and the other was with local artists, Christine Anu, Anthony Callea, Rick Price and Katie Noonan paying tribute to the Bee Gees.

Arena released her first English-language solo studio album in eleven years, Reset, on 18 October 2013, which peaked at No. 4 and became her sixth Top 10 album in Australia. It was released in both standard and a deluxe editions (with three extra tracks). It was certified gold in three weeks and then platinum in December 2013. Its lead single, "You Set Fire to My Life" (September), included both studio and acoustic versions; as well as three official remixes by Cosmic Dawn, The Slips and 7th Heaven—it reached the ARIA top 40. The track "Only Lonely" featured in Channel 7's Home and Away promo, which also reached the top 40. Also in October 2013 Arena published her autobiography, Now I Can Dance, written with Jude McGee, to coincide with the release of Reset and is now on its 4th reprint.

Arena performed at the G'Day USA Los Angeles Black Tie Gala on 11 January 2014. On 14 March 2014, Arena appeared on Sunrise and performed "You Set Fire to My Life". Also in March, Arena appeared on So You Think You Can Dance Australia to perform her single, "Reset All" (December 2013), which was accompanied by a routine from two previous winners of the series, Jack Chambers and Talia Fowler.

=== 2015–2017: Eleven, ARIA Hall of Fame and Australia Day honours ===
In May 2015, Arena issued Songs of Love & Loss in France. Her eleventh studio album, Eleven, was released on 30 October 2015. It was preceded in September by its lead single, "I Want to Love You". Arena premiered the single by performing on the live television show Dancing with the Stars on 4 September 2015.

Arena's album Eleven is so named because it is the 11th album of her recording career, but also because she likes its astrological implications, 11 being a figure of enlightenment and artistic sensitivity. Like its predecessor, 2013's Reset, Elevenis a pop-heavy collection featuring songwriting collaborations with, among others, Kate Miller-Heidke, Hayley Warner and Evermore's Jon Hume. The album was recorded in Sydney, Melbourne, London and Stockholm, as well as in Paris. The Eleven album is a mix of atmospheric electronica (Unravel Me, Overload), smouldering anthems (Wouldn't Be Love If It Didn't, Love Falls, Not Still in Love with You) and dance-friendly pop (Magic). Arena's most recent release, Eleven, became her seventh Top 10 album in Australia by debuting at No. 2 on the ARIA album chart in November 2016, and is now certified gold.

In September 2015, Arena hosted shows on SmoothFM Radio Stations from 4:00 pm every Saturday on Sydney's SmoothFM 93.5 and on Melbourne's SmoothFM 91.5.

On 25 October 2015, the Australian Recording Industry Association (ARIA) announced that Arena was due to be inducted into their Hall of Fame in the annual awards ceremony in November as a member of the Australian music industry ARIA Hall of Fame. In mid-November ARIA announced that she would be inducted by Australian-British singer and actress Kylie Minogue, also a Hall of Fame inductee—and the sister of singer Dannii Minogue, a former Young Talent Time contestant. Arena looked forward to enjoying the acknowledgment of her peers at the Australian music industry's gala celebration on 26 November 2015. She was quick to point out that receiving the honour doesn't mean she was entering the twilight of her career. "It's not the end," she says, "Not yet", adding, "I don't have another 40 years in me, I don't know how long it's going to last, but I'm touched by the recognition. It will be an emotional night". On 26 November 2015, Arena was inducted into the ARIA Hall of Fame at the 2015 ARIA Awards ceremony.

During Arena's Hall of Fame ceremony induction on 26 November 2015, fellow Australian singer Kylie Minogue—also a Hall of Fame inductee—paid tribute to Arena by stating, "I remember being blown away when she sang "MacArthur Park" on Young Talent Time, and I tried countless times to try and sing that song the way she did it and couldn't do it. She has the pipes. She could teach us all a lesson." This was a nod to Arena's entire career, as one of the Australia's highest-selling female artists, and her childhood fame on Young Talent Time from 1976 to 1983—making her the show's longest-serving cast member.

Speaking with MOZA Music in a January 2019 interview, Arena stated that:

One of my favourite moments was the Arias hall of fame induction in 2015. For myself that moment meant that I could speak freely about the industry, which I obviously love, but feel that there are far too many inequalities. Also the sheer volume of music that is made available to people makes it difficult to financially exist.

On Australia Day, 26 January 2016, Arena was recognised in the Australia Day Honours, which the country's sovereign awards its citizens for actions or deeds that benefit the nation. Arena has been appointed as a Member in the General Division of the Order of Australia—Order of Australia—in recognition of her contribution to the arts, representing Australia on the world stage and philanthropic work.

On 27 September 2016, Arena performed at the Odeon of Herodes Atticus in Athens, Greece, as a special guest of Greek singer George Perris.

On 9 December 2016, Arena, in her capacity as the official ambassador, launched the 'Versailles: Treasures From The Palace' exhibition at the National Gallery of Australia (NGA), located in Canberra in the Australian Capital Territory. The exhibit, which is said to be the most elaborate ever put on by the NGA, features 130 priceless works of 18th century of art flown to Australia from France.

On Australia Day, 26 January 2017, at the Australia Day Concert: Live at The Sydney Opera House, Arena joined a collection of Australia's best talent, including Guy Sebastian, Human Nature, Dami Im, children's group The Wiggles, and others, performing contemporary tunes and tributes to the great songs of Australia's past. The 2017 Australia Day Concert was a free public event, organised by the NSW Government through its tourism and major events agency. Arena, as one of Australia's most accomplished performers, with a career spanning several decades, said prior to the event, "Australia Day is a great opportunity to come out, eat some delicious food, listen to some amazing music and take part in the diversity that defines our country" and "I can't wait to be part of the day—to stand in the middle of the harbour, to sing with the harbour crowds and school choir, and give my own version of a salute to Australia".

In April 2017, Arena released her fifth compilation double album titled, Greatest Hits & Interpretations, released by EMI Music Australia. The album is a 2-CD set—the first contains 17 of Arena's hits; the second is an album of interpretations.The interpretations disc includes a duet with Dannii Minogue, singing with Arena for the first time since Young Talent Time.

Arena announced her Innocence to Understanding Tour in conjunction with the release of her Greatest Hits & Interpretations, starting in Brisbane on Wednesday, 6 September 2017, and concluding in early October. The title of the tour is a telling nod to her career journey, one of only a few artists who has been able to live four decades in music.

In early May 2017, Arena released her first fragrance, after working three years on the project, called Renaissance developed with Bertrand Duchaufour, one of the world's leading perfumers in Paris. Bertrand have come up with a high-quality Eau De Parfum combining ingredients sourced from Arena's three cultures: France, Italy and Australia, including sandalwood from Indigenous Australia.

In June 2017, Arena featured as the portraiture guest on the Australian TV series Anh Do's Brush with Fame aired on ABC. Arena shared journey from child star to international artist the challenges and sacrifices that have shaped her. Anh Do is a Vietnamese-born Australian author, actor, comedian, and artist. He was three-times a finalist in the annual Archibald Prize art award.

In September 2017, Arena featured as a keynote speaker at the Australian BIGSOUND Musical Conference. Now in its seventeenth year, BIGSOUND attracts more than 6,000 music fans and industry gurus who attend the event at Fortitude Valley, Queensland, for the more than 130 artists across 18 venues over three nights. Arena's keynote speech shared her experience and her advice for the changing face of the music industry, having been at the forefront of the Australian music scene for 40 years.

=== 2018: Quand tout Recommence ===
After almost a decade away, Arena made a return to French pop music with a new 2018 French-language album, Quand tout Recommence (translates to: "When Everything Restarts"), set for an April release, to the francophone music market (primarily France) and also reaching audiences in Belgium and Sweden. Quand tout Recommence is Arena's third French-language studio album, and her twelfth studio album overall, since her francophone album, 7 vies, released in January 2008, which debuted at No. 12 on the official French charts; her highest debut in France.

The album title Quand tout Recommence translates to "When Everything Restarts". Arena has stated that when she records in the French language, she is careful not to record French versions of her English-language hits, as lyric meanings in French and English differ. Arena notes that too often the intention of the song gets "lost in translation", therefore she has always chosen to write in both languages.

On 17 November 2017, Arena released on digital preview platforms a new song recording, "Tant que tu es là" (translates as "As long as you're around"), as the lead single for Quand tout Recommence.

In an April 2018 interview with Webmedia SAS Pure Charts (France), Arena defined what pulled her into the French Pop music after a decade away, recording and performing in her homeland Australia and in selective international showcase tours, Arena explains, "I wanted to re-do music in French. Everything started from there with this project. The desire". She is motivated by the desire to reconnect with the success of her French Pop hits, "Go higher" and "Love to the impossible". On her 2018 Quand tout Recommence album, Arena offers ten new songs recorded in the language of Molière, L'ombre de ma voix (Translates to: The Shadow of My Voice"). The contents of songs on the record is quite varied. Recalling her former residency in French Pop Music, yet, her inaugural entry on the French Music Charts was in 1998, and was her first French platinum record. Arena concludes, ""I miss the connection with the French public. It was time. With all that happened." Good, is what happens with Arena, and France.

On 16 February 2018, Arena released on digital preview platforms the next single, L'ombre de ma voix ("The Shadow of My Voice"), from her new album Quand tout Recommence.

On 6 April 2018, the new French-language album, Quand tout Recommence was released on the francophone market, with the album peaking on the French album chart Top 150 at No.62, and also peaking on the Belgium album chart at No.46. The two single releases and the complete album, Quand tout recommence, are now available to download and stream worldwide.

=== 2018: L'ombre de ma voix music video ===
An accompanying official music video for L'ombre de ma voix ("The Shadow of My Voice"), was released on 16 February 2018. The music video director is Michael Westbrook with production by Positive Dream Réalisation.

The video thematically delivers a nostalgic mood, as Arena traces her 40-year career in the music industry, showing a montage of video footage and TV clips across her lifespan as a live performer. Capturing the visual evolution of Arena's artistry, beginning in 1974 for the then-eight-year-old child performer on Young Talent Time.

In the Quand tout Recommence music video, Arena appears multiple times in every frame, and it doubles and triples; Arena is seen as the artist she is today, in the recording studio, and throughout the footage of clips revolving around her, as she is evolving through her career. The montage chronicles Arena's childhood, and adolescence, to womanhood—including childhood piano lessons, roller-skating, backstage rehearsals, signing autographs with fans, to singing live at the Sydney Olympic Games 2000, and more. Clearly, Tina Arena has always got to work, sung her heart out and in again, and she keeps working. The song title, "The Shadow of My Voice", makes a report on 40 years her a career, composed of ups and downs, and mixes childhood images, live performances, and studio sessions. The opportunity is taken by the Australian to prove that she is still active and far from relying on her previous success.

=== 2018–2025 ===
In January 2018, Arena performed as part of the live-music program at the Australian Open 2018 Grand Slam tennis tournament at Melbourne Park.

In February 2018, Arena featured as the portrait guest in an episode of the Australian TV series Anh Do's Brush with Fame with comedian and artist Anh Do, on the ABC network. Arena shared her journey from child star to international artist, reflecting on the challenges and sacrifices that have shaped her.

In March 2019, the Government of Australia appointed Arena as a board member of the Australia Council for the Arts for a three-year term. The council, informally known as the Australia Council, is the principal arts council or arts funding body of the federal government. The federal arts minister, Mitch Fifield, released a statement that Arena will be a welcome influence, "The high-profile singer-songwriter, musician and musical theatre actor brings significant experience as an artist to the board."

In May 2019, Arena was awarded the perennial Excellence in Community Award by the Australian Music in the House organisation. The award was presented at Support Act Limited's annual Music in the House event. The award recognises "members of the music industry who, by their tireless efforts and charitable works, have made a difference and enriched the fabric of the broader Australian community".

In June 2019, Arena was nominated in the category of Best Female Actor in a Musical at the annual Helpmann Awards for her lead role performance as Eva Perón in Evita. She was nominated alongside Luisa Scrofani, Natalie Abbott and Ursula Yovich. The award was won by Yovich for Barbara and the Camp Dogs.

On 6 September 2019, Arena appeared as a guest performer and speaker with indigenous Australian artist Deborah Cheetham, a soprano, actor, composer and playwright, at the 2019 Melbourne Writers Festival. The two artists spoke about how music shapes them.

Arena performed at the Sydney Coliseum Opening Week opening program in December 2019. Originally launched as the Western Sydney Performing Arts, the Sydney Coliseum Theatre, West H.Q.

In December 2019, Arena performed at the Good Things music festival. Arena will join the festival line-up as a cameo guest artist, along with Lisa and Jessica Origliasso of the Veronicas.

Arena filmed a supporting role, as Rosalba, in the Australian film Promised (2019), directed and co-produced by Nick Conidi. She co-stars with Paul Mercurio, Antoniette Iesue and Daniel Berini.

In 2023, Arena appeared as Plante Carnivore (Carnivorous Plant) on Mask Singer, the French version of The Masked Singer.

==== 2018 Evita: Australian tour production ====
The Opera Australia 2018 national tour, Evita, was the 40th-anniversary restaging of the original Harold Prince production. Prince's production won seven Tony Awards when it moved to Broadway after originally opening in London's West End, and it became the template for subsequent productions of the musical for the following quarter of a century. The musical charts Eva Perón's life from an ambitious teenager, through her career as the First Lady of Argentina from 1946, until her death in 1952 at the age of 33. It includes some of Andrew Lloyd Webber and Tim Rice's best known material, including "Another Suitcase in Another Hall" and "Don't Cry for Me Argentina".

===== Casting =====
On 21 August 2017, Opera Australia announced that Arena would be taking on the lead role of Eva Perón in the 2018 Australian touring production of Evita. The tour opened at Sydney Opera House, in the Joan Sutherland Theatre, on 13 September 2018, with the season running to 3 November 2018. It subsequently moved to the Arts Centre Melbourne from 5 to 30 December 2018. Arena said that she was "terrified", but described the role as "a precious gift for myself and for any female performer". She said that she felt "blessed to work with someone who has had the kind of career that Hal Prince has had". Arena also says she felt the time was right to tackle the role: "I have been approached to do this role on a couple of occasions. I never felt emotionally ready for it. I felt I had a lot of living and learning before I could get up and take on the enormity of the story and the human spirit she possessed." Arena expressed of knowing about Eva Perón since she was a little girl, and feeling privileged to be able to recount the story and embrace the complex role.

On 7 May 2018, Opera Australia's artistic director, Lyndon Terracini, along with producers John Frost and David Ian, announced the full cast for the upcoming Australian production of Evita. With Arena announced in the lead role as Eva Perón, the remainder of the cast was announced as: Paulo Szot, Brazilian operatic baritone, and winner of a Tony Award for best actor on Broadway 2008, in the role of Juan Perón; Kurt Kansley (The Lion King, Rent, Godspell, Show Boat) will take on the role of the revolutionary Che Guevara. Michael Falzon (We Will Rock You, Jesus Christ Superstar, Chess) will portray tango singer Agustín Magaldi, while the role of Perón's Mistress will be played by Alexis van Maanen. Jemma Rix (WICKED, The Wizard of Oz) has been cast as the alternate Eva Perón and is currently scheduled to be appearing in the role at least once a week throughout the Sydney season, according to the Evita-Australia website.

On 21 July 2018, Terracini, along with producers John Frost and David Ian, announced the 18 young performers who have been cast in the upcoming production of Evita, in season at the Sydney Opera House from September 2018. Three sets of six children will alternate in ensemble roles.

===== Arena on Eva Perón =====
In taking on the titular role of Eva Perón in Evita for Opera Australia, Arena commented to the ABC's Limelight magazine that she was "terrified", but described the role as "a precious gift for myself and for any female performer". She said that she felt "blessed to work with someone who has had the kind of career that Hal Prince has had". Arena also notes that she felt the time was right to tackle the role:

I have been approached to do this role on a couple of occasions. I never felt emotionally ready for it. I felt I had a lot of living and learning before I could get up and take on the enormity of the story and the human spirit she possessed. I don't think I was ready in my 30s to play Eva Perón at all. Playing the role of Eva Perón at 50, is much more suited to the life experience that I have had.

Arena talked of knowing about Perón since she was a girl and about feeling privileged to recount the story and embrace the complex role.

===== Opening night: Sydney Opera House =====
The official opening night of the Evita at the Sydney Opera House was on 13 September 2018. Evita's lyricist, Sir Tim Rice, attended, having travelled to Australia for the event a week after joining the EGOT winners club. Arena received a prolonged standing ovation for the portrayal as Eva Perón. Sydney's Daily Telegraph reported that "Arena soars in a sublime performance of the First Lady of Argentina. Even those who don't know the musical Evita, are probably familiar with the song 'Don't Cry for Me Argentina' and it was at this point on opening night that Arena really powered into her own as Eva Perón."

===== National tour: Arts Centre Melbourne =====
The Victorian tour leg of the Evita tour was at the State Theatre at the Arts Centre Melbourne in December 2018.

In February 2019, it was reported that the production had become the highest selling show ever staged at the State Theatre. Claire Spencer, CEO of the Arts Centre Melbourne, noted that "It is fantastic to have such an accomplished cast, including cherished global star Tina Arena perform Evita at Arts Centre Melbourne. Tina is particularly close to our hearts as one of the 'Patrons of the Australian Music Vault' at Arts Centre Melbourne."

===== Critical reception =====
On 19 September 2018, the ABC's classical music and arts magazine Limelight's theatre reviewer, Angus McPherson, gave a four-star review of Evita at the Sydney Opera House. The review, "Evita – Tina Arena gives us a vocally high flying Evita in Hal Prince's original production", stated that, "The role of the tough, ambitious, Evita isn't an easy sing, and it comes with baggage—anyone taking it on is walking in the footsteps of the likes of Elaine Paige, Patti LuPone and Madonna (in the 1996 film with Antonio Banderas)—but Arena proves herself more than equal to the vocal demands. She doesn't have the heavy belt of a LuPone, but she's got a deliciously sultry low register and she handles the lighter high notes with confidence, letting rip when it's called for—her rallying oration in 'A New Argentina', buoyed by the chorus, is a rousing finale to the show's first act. Brazilian opera singer Paulo Szot, brings a magisterial baritone to Juan Perón. Arena comes into her own in the second act, with highlights including the show's hit Don't Cry For Me Argentina (in quite a broad rendition), as well as Rainbow High, Waltz for Eva and Che and You Must Love Me—which was written for Madonna in the film and inserted here, Arena alone onstage, 'in concert' style. The show ends on a sombre note, and if Evita's final moments don't quite hit home emotionally, her assumption of power is thrillingly done, Arena's vocals capturing her commanding power and charisma."

On 19 September 2018, The Sydney Morning Herald theatre reviewer, Joyce Morgan, gave a four-star review of Evita. The review, "Evita review: Don't cry for Tina Arena's timely Eva", states that "What you do get is a show with renewed currency about the rise and demise of one of Latin America's most intriguing and controversial figures, Eva Peron. You also get a woman at the height of her musical powers in the show-stopper scene as Tina Arena, in the title role, steps regally along the presidential balcony to deliver with melting clarity and conviction the anthemic 'Don't Cry for Me Argentina'. In this 40th-anniversary restaging of the original Harold Prince production, the misogyny, sexism and patronising disdain by the powerful forces arrayed against our heroine takes the breath away. Not least because some of the abuse seems as current as that excreted by social media trolls. Rice's lyrics still pack a punch."

On 20 September 2018, The Guardian's musicals reviewer, Clarissa Sebag-Montefiore, gave a four-star review of Evita. The review, "Tina Arena is Resplendent and Tough as Designer Dictator", stated that "In Opera Australia's production, Eva Perón wins over a nation with a Christian Dior dress and steely determination, and a killer ballad steals the show. At the centre of it all is Evita, played with a resplendent toughness by Arena. It is to her credit that in a few hours she can turn from a naive, if plucky, teenager eager to leave her poor upbringing behind to a grown woman ravaged by illness and yet still desperate to cling to the last vestiges of power. The score stands the test of time too, Under director Harold Prince's deft hands, the song, 'Don't Cry for Me Argentina', shows its true colours: it is designed as a master class in political manipulation."

In February 2019, it was reported that the production had become the highest-selling show ever staged at the State Theatre, Arts Centre Melbourne. Claire Spencer, the Arts Centre Melbourne CEO, said that "It is fantastic to have such an accomplished cast, including cherished global star Tina Arena perform Evita at Arts Centre Melbourne. Tina is particularly close to our hearts as one of the Patrons of the Australian Music Vault at Arts Centre Melbourne."

On 2 May 2019, Limelight reported that Opera Australia published its annual report for 2018, stating that "Opera Australia posts a (AU)$5.6 million profit for 2018." Details published that "overall attendance was 543,498 from 637 total performances, with the numbers bolstered by the musical My Fair Lady. Seasons of the musical Evita in Sydney and Melbourne led the charge in 2018, followed by the Handa Opera on Sydney Harbour production of La bohème."

In June 2019, Arena was nominated in the category of Best Female Actor in a Musical at the annual Helpmann Awards for her role as Eva Perón in Evita. Arena was nominated alongside Luisa Scrofani, Natalie Abbott, and Ursula Yovich. The award was won by Yovich for Barbara and the Camp Dogs.

=== 2026 ===
In August Arena announced the forthcoming release of a new six-track covers EP Way of the World on 16 October. Co-produced by François Tétaz and Luke Howard, the songs are being recorded at SynthTemple, and include covers of songs by artists such as New Order, Max Q, Depeche Mode, Duran Duran, and Frank Ocean, using orchestral arrangements, prepared piano, analogue synthesisers, and digital layers.

== Artistry ==
Arena possesses the vocal range of a soprano. She is multilingual: she speaks and sings in English, Italian and French; and also sings in Spanish. Her singing style is characterised as between R&B and ballad.

Numerous media and musical contemporaries have praised Arena's skill as a world-class singer. Music journalist Ed Nimmervoll commented that Arena "has a voice that can give you goosebumps", while news journalist Kate de Brito says that it is "smooth and musical even when she talks." Cameron Adams of the Herald Sun says she has a "beautiful voice telling a beautiful story." William Yeoman of The West Australian commented that "Arena's voice is redolent of both youthful pop and mature cabaret." The Australian Broadcasting Corporation's monthly classical music and arts magazine, Limelight, commented that, "Tina Arena is a performer with a supreme voice, boundless range and energy, and charm to spare." Kelsey Munro of The Sydney Morning Herald says that her voice is "strong, smooth and pitch-perfect." According to Heidi Maier of Tom magazine, it can be described as "remarkably strong". She also said, "Tina Arena has a powerhouse voice and when she hits her marks, she hits them with forcefulness and verve." Spiritworks Australia says, "Whether she's singing spine-tingling renditions of contemporary classics by Lulu, Dusty Springfield or Blondie or her self-penned hits Sorrento Moon, Chains or Burn, Tina Arena is acclaimed as one of the world's most versatile and magnificent vocal interpreters. Her voice is smooth, rich and streaming with emotion."

The Queensland Music Festival team says, "Tina sparkles with vivacity and class, possessing an outstanding vocal range and a voice that belies her petite stature—endlessly powerful and always resonant with heart and honesty." Queensland Music Festival artistic director, James Morrison said "Tina Arena has one of the most amazing voices I've ever heard." Time Out magazine had a brief description of Tina's voice as it says, "Tina Arena truly boasts two incredible assets—her voice and her versatility ..." Melbourne's 89.9 Light FM declared that Arena is "undisputedly one of Australia's finest voices". Sharyn Hamey, an online music reviewer says that "Arena has an angelic, beautiful and a powerful voice."

Fellow Australian celebrities have praised Arena's vocal prowess with Delta Goodrem saying, "Her voice has strength whilst keeping its feminine warmth to draw you in." Melbourne singer-songwriter, Michael Paynter hailed Arena as "simultaneously the most natural and supernatural female Australian voice ever. She is technically and emotionally perfect, but somehow always has enough of a sniff of imperfection and rawness to make you not only believe every word, but be hanging off them too." Ricki-Lee Coulter also says that "She has so much control and power". Missy Higgins also commented that, "Tina Arena is one of our best singers ever. She could sing the balls off anyone, and she's miniature." Brian Mannix says, "Tina Arena has a tasteful voice. She sells the lyrics with her big voice but never over-sings." Birds of Tokyo frontman Ian Kenny says, "Tina Arena can sing the shit out of anything, and do it in four different languages!" Anthony Callea added, "Technically, she is faultless and her tone is unique and warm. I love that she goes against all the 'singers' rules'—I've seen what she eats and drinks before a gig!" Darren Hayes also made an effort in letting the public know that Arena's voice is one of his favourite voices in Australia through Twitter.

Arena records songs and albums in English, French, Italian and Spanish. She has stated that she does not record French versions of her English-language popular hits, because too often the intention of the song gets "lost in translation"; therefore, she has always chosen to write in both languages.

Arena's musical influences include Barbra Streisand, Carole King, Dusty Springfield, Petula Clark, Aretha Franklin and various Italian singers. She has noted that in a non-musical perspective, Diana, Princess of Wales inspired her and called her "a great role model for women".

== Legacy ==
Arena's tracks have been covered by country music artists, including Wynonna Judd ("Heaven Help My Heart", "Love's Funny That Way"), Jo Dee Messina ("Burn"), Pam Tillis ("If I Didn't Love You"), Terri Clark ("Unsung Hero"), Kellie Coffey, Kathie Baillie ("Love's Funny That Way") and LeAnn Rimes ("You Made Me Find Myself").

Younger artists have covered Arena's songs in singing competitions, such as the winner of the second season of Australian Idol, Casey Donovan, who recorded Arena's "Symphony of Life" for her album For You and both Filipino artist Sarah Geronimo and Australian Anthony Callea, who admits to being a fan of Arena's, recorded "I Want to Know What Love Is" including the bridge that was written specifically for Arena's version. Sarah De Bono who came in at fourth place when she joined The Voice Australia also recorded Arena's "If I Didn't Love You." Filipino artists Nina and Christian Bautista recorded a duet version of "Burn" that appeared on Nina's album Nina Live! while Regine Velasquez did a live performance on Philippine television. Erik Santos and Sheryn Regis also recorded their version of Arena and Marc Anthony's duet, "I Want to Spend My Lifetime Loving You".

In 2001, Arena was awarded a BMI Foundation Songwriting Award (Broadcast Music Inc.) by the American performance rights organisation for co-writing "Burn" with Pam Reswick and Steve Werfel.

In April 2013, Arena was voted Australia's all-time greatest female singer and third greatest singer overall in an industry poll conducted by Australian music journalist, Cameron Adams, for the Herald Sun. As of July 2014, Arena has sold over 10 million records worldwide.

In 2015, Arena was inducted into the Australian Recording Industry Association ARIA Hall of Fame at the 2015 ARIA Awards ceremony.

In the 2016 Australia Day Honours, Arena was appointed as a Member of the Order of Australia (AM) in recognition of her contribution to the arts, representing Australia on the world stage and philanthropic work.

In December 2020, Arena was listed at number 30 in Rolling Stone Australia's "50 Greatest Australian Artists of All Time" issue.

== Personal life ==
Throughout her career, Arena has lived variously in the United States, France and the United Kingdom.

In December 1995, Arena married Ralph Carr, who had been her manager since 1992. Their divorce was finalised in 1999, and they settled financial and contractual matters in February 2002.

In the late 1990s, Arena relocated from Australia to live in Paris, France. In 2000, Arena met the French artist Vincent Mancini, with whom she has a son, Gabriel Joseph Mancini, born in 2005.

In October 2012, after almost two decades of living in France and London, Arena, together with Mancini and their son, moved back to Melbourne from Paris.

In 2019, Arena told MOZA Music, "I've been fortunate to have been around the pre-digital world. My story's unique, I'm aware of that and don't take it for granted. How do I define success? I define it by the fact that I'm still around; and that I've managed to survive".

== Views ==
=== Music industry politics ===
Arena has been a supporter of female artists in the music industry, particularly celebrating the long-term careers of mature women artists. Arena believes we should embrace and celebrate ageing and not fall victim to ageism—especially in the music industry where mature women are not seen as viable or relevant.

To the British newspaper The Guardian, Arena described herself as somebody with "certain points on the board"—someone who has been "tenacious, resilient, hung around for a long time" and "done everything in their power to hone their craft". It is from the place—as one of Australia's great musical dames—that she makes abrasive critiques of what constitutes a career in music today. "I've struggled with the phantasmal aspect that has been a part of what we do" she says. "The fact that it has been really glamourised, glorified, also dumbed down as well." Thus, she argues that the music industry has been peddling shoddy wares, saying "It's a business template they've used. They've told people that you can be a star and sold that dream to everybody. I think it's been a huge irresponsibility".

In December 2016, in the Rolling Stone video series Her Sound, Her Story: Tina Arena, she discusses how the music industry squanders women as both they and their careers mature. "You've got to give me a really damn good reason why somebody, who is in the prime of their career and are doing really good work, why on earth they should stop? Are you going to tell a male who is at the top of his game in whatever domain, that he needs to step down and retire?". Speaking to series creators Michelle Grace Hunder and Claudia Sangiorgi Dalimore, Arena goes on to talk about the importance of female solidarity, mentioning how competition between women can be (and has been) dismantled by supportive relationships and encouragement of other women. Arena says "Get out of the ring. Take your boxing gloves off. Be convinced in the argument of your thoughts and your dreams."

=== Time's Up movement and the Australian music industry ===
In December 2017, Arena joined over 600 high-profile female artists from the Australian music industry—including Missy Higgins, the Veronicas, Sarah Blasko, and Jenny Morris—in signing an open letter called #MeNoMore demanding change in the music industry, in support of Time's Up to fight workplace sexual harassment and assault. The authors of the open letter stated they are motivated to organise the letter as an Australian response to the #MeToo campaign movement triggered by the accounts of sexual abuse in the wider entertainment industry. Sony Music Entertainment, Universal Music Group and Warner Music Group responded with words of support.

Following the January 2018 creation of US Time's Up campaign by a collective of Hollywood female artists to fight workplace sexual harassment and assault, Arena joined with more than 30 high-profile women from the Australian media and entertainment industries—including Deborah Mailman, Sarah Blasko and Danielle Cormack—to spearhead a new national organisation, NOW Australia, led by broadcaster Tracey Spicer, to tackle sexual harassment, abuse and assault in workplaces across Australia. On Twitter, the Australian #MeToo campaign has encouraged stories of workplace harassment and assault following her public call-out on Twitter in October 2017.

In March 2018, in support of the Time's Up and #MeToo campaigns, Arena authored an op-ed article titled "The music industry must join us with #thetimeisNOW", published by News Corp Australia. Arena state her views on how the Australian music industry has enabled "a stagnant perspective towards females". Arena stated future social goals in the op-ed, that "We need to raise the bar of our emotional intelligence because this is not a whinge, it's not a social media trend, and NOW Australia is going to keep the issue of sexual harassment at the forefront and do everything we possibly can to change the mentality that allows it to happen. We've got a lot of work to do here."

=== Anti-lockdown sentiments ===
In September 2021, Arena appeared on Australian daytime television program Studio 10 to highlight the disparity between the art community and sporting events in relation to COVID-19. During this interview, she advocated that the arts sector should no longer support charitable causes and that Victorian lockdowns should be ended. Arena cited as her reasons in the interview the double standards in how the arts and sports are treated, as large scale music events are cancelled "but never the footy match" and her belief that no one wants to help out the artistic community after "the artistic community has done what they needed to do and always rolled up our sleeves".

== Memoir ==
Arena's memoir, Now I Can Dance, published by HarperCollins, was released on 14 October 2013 in hardback, paperback and eBook format. Arena authoured her memoir with co-writer Jude McGee. The text is billed by HarperCollins as "Honest and intimate, funny and frank", adding: "Now I Can Dance is the long-awaited memoir from the very special, much-loved singer, songwriter and pop diva, Tina Arena." She told Kathy McCabe of News Corp Australia that "I don't need to put a book out to put food on the table. It started to dawn on me in the last year that I have had an unbelievable life and I want people to know it's been hilarious, there's been a lot of laughter in my journey." Publisher: HarperCollins Publishers (Australia) Pty Ltd (14 October 2013).

The title of her memoir is taken from the third single, "Now I Can Dance", from Arena's third studio album In Deep (1997). The track was written by Arena while living in L.A. and is a love letter from her to her family, as she explained in her memoir. The song was successful in her native Australia, reaching No. 13 on the ARIA Singles Chart.

The Australian Broadcasting Corporation shop described Tina Arena's memoir as an "honest, gritty, funny, frank and totally revealing memoir from much loved songstress Tina Arena, who is about to celebrate a phenomenally successful 40 years as a singer-songwriter."

HarperCollins said, "Tina has amassed a cache of amazing stories. The artist who gave us "Chains", "Sorrento Moon" and "Symphony of Life" has sold eight million albums, won a swag of awards, encountered extraordinary people, fallen in and out of love, and experienced incredible highs and lows."

In 2017, Arena updated her memoir with the release of a new edition of Now I Can Dance with new content covering her relocation from France back to Australia, being inducted into the 2015 ARIA Hall of Fame, the release of new music, and new musical ventures.

== Charities ==
Arena has used her fame to help several causes and is a patron to two charities in Australia: child protection organisation Barnardos, and Soldier On, which supports rehabilitation for veterans. In her support, she is an official patron for a charitable organisation Soldier On, which assists mentally and physically wounded Australian soldiers. Arena said, "It's vital that Australian soldiers have access to support when they return from overseas, and 'Soldier On' will make a much needed difference in the lives of wounded veterans and their families. 'Soldier On' is the first charity of its kind in Australia and I am honoured to be a Patron."

In July 2013, Arena performed at the Melbourne Asbestos Cancer Fundraiser, which donated funds raised to support Mesothelioma research undertaken at the Olivia Newton-John Cancer & Wellness Centre and the Austin Hospital, Melbourne. She was also a participant, with partner Damian Whitewood, in the 13th Australian season of Dancing with the Stars which commenced in September 2013 and nominated Barnardos Australia as her charity; the pair finished in third place.

Arena took part in Australia's biggest TV charity appeal, Telethon, in Perth on 20 October 2013. On 21 December 2013, she opened Sydney's annual Carols in the Domain concert with "O Come, All Ye Faithful" and performed her single "Reset All" at the closing of the event. She has also performed at several benefit concerts, including Live 8 in Paris and for Queensland Flood Relief in 2013.

In November 2014, Arena released a cover version of 10cc's 1976 song The Things We Do For Love, with funds raised going towards the National Breast Cancer Foundation.

Arena, reflecting on nearly 40 years in the music industry, relates all of her achievements back to her Australian beginnings: "If it wasn't for Australia, I would never have been able to have been catapulted internationally and to have done the things that I've been able to do. It was because of Australia that I've done that". she told AAP, in 2013.

In May 2019, Arena was awarded the perennial Excellence in Community Award by the Australian Music in the House Organisation. The award was presented at Support Act Limited's annual Music in the House event on 29 May 2019. The award recognises "members of the music industry who, by their tireless efforts and charitable works, have made a difference and enriched the fabric of the broader Australian community".

== Discography ==
=== Studio albums ===
English-language albums

- Tiny Tina and Little John (1977)
- Strong as Steel (1990)
- Don't Ask (1994)
- In Deep (1997)
- Just Me (2001)
- Songs of Love & Loss (2007)
- Songs of Love & Loss 2 (2008)
- Reset (2013)
- Eleven (2015)
- Love Saves (2023)

French-language albums

- Un autre univers (2005)
- 7 vies (2008)
- Quand tout Recommence (2018)

== Television ==
List of notable TV appearances Arena has made over the years.

Television
Year	Title	Role	Notes
1977–1983	Young Talent Time	Herself	"Tiny" Tina Arena as she was fondly called started her career in this show before becoming an international recording artist.
1986	The Flying Doctors	Miss Broken Hill	An Australian drama series where Tina Arena played as Miss Broken Hill
1991	All Together Now	Vanessa	An Australian sitcom where Tina Arena played as Vanessa
1994	Rugby League Grand Final	Tina sings "Advance Australia Fair"	TV special
1995	AFL League Grand Final	Herself	Arena performed "Waltzing Matilda"
1995	Waltzing Matilda: The Song That Shaped a Nation	Herself	Video documentary
1998	Tina Arena – In Deep In Concert	Herself performs live concert	Channel 9 TV special
1998	Andrew Lloyd Webber: The Royal Albert Hall Celebration	Herself	Arena performed "Whistle Down the Wind" as a tribute to Lord Andrew Lloyd Webber for his 50th birthday.
1999	VH1 Presents Donna Summer: Live and More ... Encore!	Herself	Arena performed "No More Tears (Enough Is Enough)" with the late Donna Summer. The performance and the song received praises from the media and was later included on Summer's live album, Live & More Encore.
2000	Laws	Herself	TV series, 1 episode
2000	2000 Sydney Olympics Games Opening Ceremony	Herself	TV special Worldwide broadcasting was done for this event as Arena sang the Olympic song, "The Flame"
2005	Live 8	Herself	Performed "Come Together" with Craig David and her own French hit single, "Aller plus haut"
2008	Australian Idol	Herself	Arena appeared as a guest judge together with ex-Savage Garden member, Darren Hayes. She later on appeared as a mentor for the Idols' Choice week to the remaining top 3 contestants
2009	An Audience with Tina Arena	Herself	Arena performed songs from her Songs of Love & Loss albums as Australian media and other celebrities watched and asked her questions in between performances
2010	Who Do You Think You Are?	Herself	Season 3, Episode 3 – The episode featured Arena travelling to Sicily to discover her ancestral roots and family secrets
2012	Young Talent Time	Herself	Arena appeared as a mentor to the new YTT team and a judge for the talent quest portion of the show
2013	Dancing with the Stars	Herself	Arena won third place during the 13th season of the Australian franchise.
2017	Anh Do's Brush with Fame	Herself	Season 2, Episode 8 – The episode featured Arena as portrait artist Anh Do's guest. Arena shared her journey from child star to international artist and the challenges and sacrifices that have shaped her.

== Film ==
Year	Title	Role	Notes
2019	Promised	Rosalba	Feature Film – Australia. Arena had an acting supporting role as Rosalba, in the Australian feature film Promised (2019), directed and co-produced by Nick Conidi. She co-starred with Paul Mercurio, Antoniette Iesue, and Daniel Berini. The film was theatrically released in Australia on 24 October 2019.

== Awards ==
Arena has won several awards, including seven ARIA Awards and the World Music Award for best-selling Australian artist, which she received in both 1996 and 2000. In 2009, she was awarded the Knighthood of the Order of National Merit by the President of the French Republic, Nicolas Sarkozy, for her contributions to French culture. She is the first Australian to have received that order of state. In November 2015, she was inducted into the ARIA Hall of Fame at the annual awards ceremony.

== See also ==
- List of Italian Australians
- List of people from Melbourne
- List of Australian composers
- List of Australian women composers
