= In Deep (Tina Arena album) =

Studio album by Tina Arena
- Released: 18 August 1997
- Recorded: 1996–1997
- Genre: Pop; pop rock; dance-pop; soul
- Length: 63:25 (Australian version); 75:20 (French version)
- Label: Columbia
- Producer: Mick Jones; David Tyson

Tina Arena chronology
Don't Ask (1994)	In Deep (1997)	Souvenirs (2000)

Singles from In Deep
- 1. "Burn" Released: 14 July 1997; 2. "If I Didn't Love You" Released: 3 November 1997; 3. "Now I Can Dance" Released: 20 April 1998; 4. "Whistle Down the Wind" Released: 15 June 1998; 5. "I Want to Know What Love Is" Released: 6 August 1998; 6. "I Want to Spend My Lifetime Loving You" Released: 9 October 1998; 7. "If I Was a River" Released: 12 October 1998; 8. "Aller plus haut" Released: 9 July 1999; 9. "Les trois cloches" Released: 21 January 2000; 10. "Segnali di fumo" Released: May 2000

Professional ratings
Review scores
Source	Rating
AllMusic	3/5 stars

In Deep is the fourth studio album by Australian singer-songwriter Tina Arena, released by Columbia Records in Australia on 18 August 1997. The album entered the Australian ARIA Albums Chart at number 1 on 25 August 1997, knocking Middle of Nowhere by Hanson off the top spot, making it Arena's second number-one album after Don't Ask.

The singles released from In Deep were successful in most music markets, including Australia, France and New Zealand.

In France, In Deep peaked at number 3 on the French Albums Chart, stayed in the top 10 for 29 weeks, and spent a total of 79 weeks in the top 75. In New Zealand, the album entered the RIANZ Albums Chart at number 22, then moved up to its peak position of number 16 the week after, then spent a total of 6 weeks in the NZ top 50. In Deep has sold over 1.5 million copies worldwide.

== Overview ==
In Deep was recorded in Los Angeles, with production duties divided between Foreigner guitarist Mick Jones (who produced albums for Van Halen and Billy Joel) and David Tyson (who collaborated with Arena on Don't Ask). Arena stated the album is "essentially a live record", because concerts are what she thrived on; she also expressed that the album is "international in spirit" and that she did not want to make a record that sounded like her previous album, instead wanting to make a record that reflected her "growth as a singer, writer, performer and human being".

Several tracks were substantially remixed for international editions of the album, and the track listing was additionally expanded and altered, notably to feature Arena's duet with Marc Anthony, "I Want to Spend My Lifetime Loving You", and the titular song from the musical Whistle Down the Wind, which was released in the United Kingdom. French-language tracks Arena recorded were also included on that region's release. In total, the album yielded ten singles across its various editions: "Burn", "If I Didn't Love You", "Now I Can Dance", "Whistle Down the Wind", "I Want to Know What Love Is", "If I Was a River", "I Want to Spend My Lifetime Loving You", "Aller plus haut", "Les trois cloches" and "Segnali di fumo"; the latter three were exclusively released within French-speaking markets. The cover for the Australian version is slightly different and paler; Arena is centred on the cover between white borders.

== Commercial performance ==
In Deep entered at number 1 on the Australian ARIA Albums Chart but sales in Australia were not as high as her previous album Don't Ask (1994).

The album debuted at number 1 on the Australian ARIA Albums Chart on 25 August 1997, knocking Middle of Nowhere by Hanson off the top spot, making it Arena's second number-one album. During its fourth week in the charts, the album regained the top spot for two consecutive weeks. In Deep spent a total of three weeks at number 1 and went on to spend a total of 60 weeks in the top 100, re-entering once, and being certified triple platinum by ARIA. It was the eighth-highest-selling album in Australia for 1997 and the eighty-fifth for 1998. It was also nominated for three ARIA Awards in 1998 for Highest Selling Album, Best Female Artist and Highest Selling Single for "Burn".

In France, the album peaked at number 3 on the French Albums Chart, stayed in the top 10 for 29 weeks, and spent a total of 79 weeks in the top 75. The album became the 11th highest selling album in France for 1999 and the 18th highest selling album in 2000. The album was certified triple platinum in France by SNEP.

In New Zealand, it entered the RIANZ Albums Chart at number 22, then moved up to its peak position of number 16 the week after. The album spent a total of six weeks in the top 50 there.

In the United Kingdom, the album was not as successful as her previous top 20 album Don't Ask. In Deep peaked at number 102, spending two weeks in the top 200.

The singles released from In Deep were successful in most music markets, including Australia and France. Released in July/August 1997, "Burn" reached No. 2 on the Australian ARIA Singles Chart—becoming Arena's highest peak in Australia—and also peaking in the top 50 in New Zealand and the UK. "Burn" also made history when it became the fastest-added Australian song of all time in radio. The song was nominated for an ARIA Award for Highest Selling Single (see ARIA Music Awards of 1997). The French version also included Arena's first French-language single, "Aller plus haut". The song became a huge hit in France, where it peaked at number 2 for six consecutive weeks, becoming Arena's highest peak there.

== Track listing ==
Australian version
No.	Title	Writer(s)	Length
1.	"Burn" (Australian album edit version)	Arena, Pam Reswick, Steve Werfel	4:24
2.	"If I Didn't Love You" (Australian album edit version)	Arena, Reswick, Werfel	4:36
3.	"Sixteen Years"	Arena, David Tyson, Christopher Ward	5:10
4.	"In Command" (Australian album edit version)	Arena, Heather Field, Tyson	5:06
5.	"Not for Sale"	Arena, Field, Robert Parde	3:55
6.	"Unsung Hero" (Australian album long version)	Arena, Dean McTaggart, Tyson	4:37
7.	"I Want to Live with You"	Arena, Jones, Reswick, Werfel	4:54
8.	"Welcome to My World"	Arena, Reswick, Werfel	4:47
9.	"I Want to Know What Love Is" (Australian album edit version)	Mick Jones	5:34
10.	"Flashback"	Arena, Jones, Page	4:25
11.	"Now I Can Dance"	Arena, Tyson	5:53
12.	"Stay / Burn (Reprise)" (hidden track)	Arena, Reswick, Werfel	10:06

French version
No.	Title	Writer(s)	Length
1.	"Aller plus haut"	J. Kapler	5:05
2.	"I Want to Spend My Lifetime Loving You" (duet with Marc Anthony)	James Horner, Will Jennings	4:42
3.	"I Want to Know What Love Is"	Mick Jones	6:21
4.	"Les trois cloches"	Christophe Battaglia, J. Kapler	5:18
5.	"Segnali di Fumo" (duet with Luca Barbarossa)		3:45
6.	"Burn"	Arena, Pam Reswick, Steve Werfel	4:44
7.	"If I Was a River"	Diane Warren	5:21
8.	"No Shame"	Arena, Reswick, Werfel	5:18
9.	"If I Didn't Love You"	Arena, Reswick, Werfel	5:02
10.	"Sixteen Years"	Arena, David Tyson, Christopher Ward	5:10
11.	"I Want to Live with You"	Arena, Jones, Reswick, Werfel	4:54
12.	"In Command"	Arena, Heather Field, Tyson	5:30
13.	"Unsung Hero" (choir mix)	Arena, Dean McTaggart, Tyson	4:07
14.	"Now I Can Dance"	Arena, Tyson	5:53
15.	"Chains"	Arena, Pam Reswick, Steve Werfel	4:18

UK and Brazilian version
No.	Title	Writer(s)	Length
1.	"Burn"	Arena, Pam Reswick, Steve Werfel	4:44
2.	"If I Was a River"	Diane Warren	5:21
3.	"No Shame"	Arena, Reswick, Werfel	5:18
4.	"If I Didn't Love You"	Arena, Reswick, Werfel	5:02
5.	"Sixteen Years"	Arena, David Tyson, Christopher Ward	5:10
6.	"I Want to Live with You"	Arena, Jones, Reswick, Werfel	4:54
7.	"Flashback"	Arena, Jones, Page	4:25
8.	"In Command"	Arena, Heather Field, Tyson	5:30
9.	"Unsung Hero"	Arena, Dean McTaggart, Tyson	4:07
10.	"Now I Can Dance"	Arena, Tyson	5:53
11.	"I Want to Know What Love Is"	Mick Jones	6:21
12.	"I Want to Spend My Lifetime Loving You" (duet with Marc Anthony)	James Horner, Will Jennings	4:42
13.	"Whistle Down the Wind"	Lloyd Webber, Steinman	3:54
14.	"Burn" (reprise)	Arena, Pam Reswick, Steve Werfel	5:34

US version
No.	Title	Writer(s)	Length
1.	"Burn" (album edit version)	Arena, Pam Reswick, Steve Werfel	4:23
2.	"If I Was a River" (long version)	Diane Warren	5:55
3.	"No Shame" (album edit version)	Arena, Reswick, Werfel	4:16
4.	"If I Didn't Love You" (album edit version)	Arena, Reswick, Werfel	4:36
5.	"Sixteen Years"	Arena, David Tyson, Christopher Ward	5:06
6.	"I Want to Live with You"	Arena, Jones, Reswick, Werfel	4:53
7.	"Flashback"	Arena, Jones, Page	4:23
8.	"In Command" (album edit version)	Arena, Heather Field, Tyson	5:05
9.	"Unsung Hero" (long version)	Arena, Dean McTaggart, Tyson	4:36
10.	"Now I Can Dance"	Arena, Tyson	5:54
11.	"I Want to Know What Love Is" (album edit version)	Mick Jones	5:33
12.	"I Want to Spend My Lifetime Loving You" (duet with Marc Anthony)	James Horner, Will Jennings	4:41

Japanese version
No.	Title	Writer(s)	Length
1.	"Burn"	Arena, Pam Reswick, Steve Werfel	4:46
2.	"If I Was a River" (long version)	Diane Warren	5:55
3.	"No Shame"	Arena, Reswick, Werfel	4:16
4.	"If I Didn't Love You"	Arena, Reswick, Werfel	5:02
5.	"Sixteen Years"	Arena, David Tyson, Christopher Ward	5:11
6.	"I Want to Live with You"	Arena, Jones, Reswick, Werfel	4:54
7.	"Flashback"	Arena, Jones, Page	4:25
8.	"In Command"	Arena, Heather Field, Tyson	5:31
9.	"Unsung Hero"	Arena, Dean McTaggart, Tyson	4:11
10.	"Now I Can Dance"	Arena, Tyson	5:54
11.	"I Want to Know What Love Is"	Mick Jones	6:23
12.	"I Want to Spend My Lifetime Loving You" (duet with Marc Anthony)	James Horner, Will Jennings	4:43
13.	"Whistle Down the Wind"	Lloyd Webber, Steinman	3:54
14.	"Love Is the Answer" (live)	Arena, Price	4:14
15.	"Burn" (reprise)	Arena, Pam Reswick, Steve Werfel	5:34

Latin America version
No.	Title	Writer(s)	Length
1.	"Burn"	Arena, Pam Reswick, Steve Werfel	4:44
2.	"If I Was a River"	Diane Warren	5:21
3.	"No Shame"	Arena, Reswick, Werfel	5:18
4.	"If I Didn't Love You"	Arena, Reswick, Werfel	5:02
5.	"Sixteen Years"	Arena, David Tyson, Christopher Ward	5:10
6.	"I Want to Live with You"	Arena, Jones, Reswick, Werfel	4:54
7.	"Flashback"	Arena, Jones, Page	4:25
8.	"In Command"	Arena, Heather Field, Tyson	5:30
9.	"Unsung Hero" (choir mix)	Arena, Dean McTaggart, Tyson	4:07
10.	"Now I Can Dance"	Arena, Tyson	5:53
11.	"I Want to Know What Love Is"	Mick Jones	6:21
12.	"I Want to Spend My Lifetime Loving You" (duet with Marc Anthony)	James Horner, Will Jennings	4:42
13.	"Now I Can Dance" (Spanish version)	Arena, Tyson	5:53
14.	"Burn" (Spanish version)	Arena, Pam Reswick, Steve Werfel	4:46

== Personnel ==
- Schuyler Deale – bass
- Jeff Jacobs – keyboards, piano, programming
- John Robinson – drums, percussion
- Leland Sklar – bass
- David Tyson – keyboards, piano, programming
- Lenny Castro - Percussion

== Charts ==
=== Weekly charts ===
Weekly chart performance for In Deep
Chart (1997–2000)	Peak position
Australian Albums (ARIA)	1
Belgian Albums (Ultratop Wallonia)	6
European Albums (Eurotipsheet)	31
French Albums (SNEP)	3
New Zealand Albums (RMNZ)	16
Swiss Albums (Schweizer Hitparade)	31
UK Albums (OCC)	102

=== Year-end charts ===
Year-end chart performance for In Deep
Chart (1997)	Position
Australian Albums (ARIA)	8
Chart (1998)	Position
Australian Albums (ARIA)	85
Chart (1999)	Position
French Albums (SNEP)	11
Chart (2000)	Position
Belgian Albums (Ultratop Wallonia)	34
French Albums (SNEP)	18
Swiss Albums (Schweizer Hitparade)	95

== Certifications ==
Certifications for In Deep
Region	Certification	Certified units/sales
Australia (ARIA)	3× Platinum	210,000^{^}
Belgium (BRMA)	Gold	25,000^{*}
France (SNEP)	3× Platinum	900,000^{*}
Switzerland (IFPI Switzerland)	Gold	25,000^{^}
^{*} Sales figures based on certification alone.^{^} Shipments figures based on certification alone.

== Release history ==
Release history for In Deep
Region	Date	Label	Catalogue
Australia	18 August 1997	Columbia	497837 2
New Zealand	18 August 1997	Columbia	497837 2
United Kingdom	26 October 1998	Columbia	
France	9 October 1998	Columbia	493334 9
United States	11 March 1999	Columbia	493334 9
France (French version)	30 March 1999	Columbia	
