= Jean Villard =

Swiss actor and singer (1895–1982)

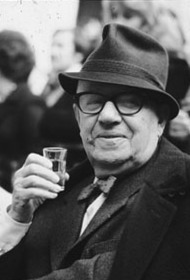
Gilles photographied in 1975 by Erling Mandelmann

Jean Villard, known as Gilles (2 June 1895 in Montreux (Switzerland) – 26 March 1982 in Vevey), originating from Daillens, was a French Swiss multi-talented chansonnier, poet, humorist, comedian, actor, and cabaretist. He was friends with Édith Piaf, Ernest Ansermet, Jacques Brel, Jean Poiret, Michel Serrault and met also with Charles-Ferdinand Ramuz. He gave his last interview in December 1981 at his home, where he confided that "I have always tried my best to be a poet."

One of Lausanne's parks, on the Avenue du Théâtre, now bears his name. He served in the Swiss Army during World War I in Soubey, Jura, recalling that he defended the bridge that crosses the river Doubs.

== Roles at the Theatre ==
- 1918: L'histoire du soldat by Igor Stravinsky and Charles Ferdinand Ramuz
- 1920-1930: Several roles at the "Théâtre du Vieux-Colombier" in Paris, directed by Jacques Copeau
- 1920: Cromedeyre-le-Vieil by Jules Romains, directed by Jacques Copeau, Théâtre du Vieux-Colombier
- 1930: Plays in « La Compagnie des Quinze »
- 1931: La Mauvaise Conduite d'après Plaute, Théâtre du Vieux-Colombier

== Chansonnier ==
- 1932–1939 duo « Gilles et Julien », with A.-M. Julien (Aman Maistre (1903–2001)
- 1940–1948 duo with Édith Burger,
- 1948–1975 duo with Albert Urfer

== Cabaret owner ==
- 1940 : he founded the cabaret « Coup de Soleil » in Lausanne with Edith Burger, an anti-Nazi, resistance, gathering place
- 1947 : he founded the cabaret « Chez Gilles » in Paris
  - discovers Jacques Brel, then an unknown beginner whom he immediately hired.
- 1955 : « Chez Gilles » in Lausanne

== Some well-known works ==
- 1932: Dollar, first « chanson française engagée » of the 20th century
- 1936: La Belle France the anthem of the French Resistance Popular Front
- 1940: Les trois cloches interpreted by Édith Piaf with Les Compagnons de la chanson
- 1940: 14 juillet
- 1948: Le Bonheur
- 1951: A L'Enseigne de la Fille Sans Cœur interpreted by Édith Piaf
- 1954: La Venoge
- 1958: Nos Colonels

== Books ==
- 1943, « Les Histoires de Gilles »
- 1954, « Mon demi siècle », Librérie Payot
- 1960, « La Venoge et autres poèmes » - images by Géa Augsburg, Editions du Verseau et Librairie Payot, Lausanne
- 1963, « Chansons que tout cela !», (Le meilleur de Gilles », tome I)
- 1969, « Mon demi siècle et demi », Payot
- 1971, « Le dernier mot », (Le meilleur de Gilles", tome II)
- 1978, « Amicalement vôtre, Récits, chansons et souvenir », Editions Pierre-Marcel Favre

== Plays at the Théâtre du Jorat Mézières ==
- 1950 « Passage de l'étoile »
- 1960 « La Grange aux Roud »

== Bibliography ==
- Albert Urfer, Qui va piano..., 1978
- Alex Décotte, Le siècle de Gilles, 1995
- Le meilleur de Gilles (3 volumes), Publi-Libris, 2003 ISBN 2-940251-02-9
- Joël Aguet (2005). "Jean Villard Gilles". In Andreas Kotte (ed.). Theaterlexikon der Schweiz / Dictionnaire du théâtre en Suisse / Dizionario Teatrale Svizzero / Lexicon da teater svizzer [Theater Dictionary of Switzerland] (in French). Vol. 1. Zürich: Chronos. pp. 713–714. ISBN 978-3-0340-0715-3. LCCN 2007423414. OCLC 62309181.
