= I Want to Spend My Lifetime Loving You =

1998 single by Tina Arena and Marc Anthony

Single by Tina Arena and Marc Anthony

from the album The Mask of Zorro: Music from the Motion Picture and In Deep (international version)
- B-side: "Zorro's Theme" (by the London Symphony Orchestra); 1. "Not for Sale"; 2. "Any Other Love"
- Released: October 9, 1998
- Genre: Pop
- Length: 4:41
- Label: Sony Classical; Columbia
- Songwriters: James Horner; Will Jennings
- Producer: Jim Steinman

Tina Arena singles chronology
"I Want to Know What Love Is" (1998)	"I Want to Spend My Lifetime Loving You" (1998)	"If I Was a River" (1998)

Marc Anthony singles chronology
"Contra la Corriente" (1998)	"I Want to Spend My Lifetime Loving You" (1998)	"No Sabes Como Duele" (1999)

Music video
- "I Want to Spend My Lifetime Loving You" on YouTube

"I Want to Spend My Lifetime Loving You" is a song written by James Horner and lyricist Will Jennings for the 1998 film The Mask of Zorro, of which it is the main theme in the soundtrack. For the film, the song was recorded by American singer Marc Anthony and Australian singer Tina Arena. Released as a single in Europe by Sony Classical and Columbia Records, the duet reached number three in France, number four in the Netherlands, number nine in Wallonia, and number 34 in Switzerland.

At the 1999 ALMA Awards, it won Outstanding Performance of a Song for a Feature Film. Australia's Got Talent runner up Greg Gould and Australian Idol finalist Cosima De Vito released a version of the song in 2023.

== Critical reception ==
Larry Flick from Billboard magazine wrote, "James Horner and Will Jennings, the writing team behind Celine Dion's 'My Heart Will Go On', try to make a little more cinematic pop magic with the theme to The Mask Of Zorro. Will it meet with similarly manic consumer response? Probably not. But it's a fine showcase for the lovely voices of Anthony and Arena (the latter is practically channeling Dion in her performance). The song has a grand Spanish flavor that suits the tone of the film. Expect AC programmers to jump on this one, while top 40 tastemakers hang back and wait to see how the movie does at the box office."

== Music video ==
A music video for the song was released in 1998, directed by British director Nigel Dick. It features Tina Arena and Marc Anthony singing on a stage in front of an audience, with footage from the film playing out on a projector screen.

== Track listing ==
European CD single

1. "I Want to Spend My Lifetime Loving You" – 4:41
2. "Zorro's Theme" (The London Symphony Orchestra) – 3:01
3. "Not for Sale" – 3:55
4. "Any Other Love" – 4:39

== Charts ==
=== Weekly charts ===
Chart (1998–1999)	Peak position
Austria (Ö3 Austria Top 40)	38
Belgium (Ultratop 50 Flanders)	34
Belgium (Ultratop 50 Wallonia)	9
Canada Adult Contemporary (RPM)	52
Europe (Eurochart Hot 100)	17
France (SNEP)	3
Netherlands (Dutch Top 40)	4
Netherlands (Single Top 100)	4
Switzerland (Schweizer Hitparade)	34

=== Year-end charts ===
Chart (1998)	Position
Belgium (Ultratop 50 Wallonia)	92
France (SNEP)	39

Chart (1999)	Position
Netherlands (Dutch Top 40)	18
Netherlands (Single Top 100)	22

== Certifications ==
Region	Certification	Certified units/sales
France (SNEP)	Gold	250,000^{*}
^{*} Sales figures based on certification alone.
