= Mask Singer (French TV series) =

French reality television series

- Genre: Reality television; Game show
- Based on: King of Mask Singer by Munhwa Broadcasting Corporation; The Masked Singer by Fox
- Presented by: Camille Combal
- Judges: Kev Adams (1-9, Christmas Special); Alessandra Sublet (1-3); Anggun (1-3, Christmas Special); Jarry (1-3); Vitaa (4); Chantal Ladesou (4, 6-9, Christmas Special); Jeff Panacloc (4-5); Élodie Frégé (5); Michèle Bernier (5); Inès Reg (6); Laurent Ruquier (6-9, Christmas Special); Élodie Poux (7, 10); Michaël Youn (8-); Arnaud Ducret (10-); Constance Gay (10-)
- Country of origin: France
- Original language: French
- No. of seasons: 9
- No. of episodes: 68 (+1 Special)

Production
- Executive producer: Anthony Meunier
- Producer: Hervé Hubert
- Camera setup: Multi-camera
- Running time: 50 minutes
- Production company: Hervé Hubert

Original release
- Network: TF1
- Release: 8 November 2019 – present

Mask Singer is a French reality television series based on the format of the South Korean television game show series King of Mask Singer by Munhwa Broadcasting Corporation. Run by TF1 Group, Mask Singer is a singing competition between celebrities donning elaborate costumes and face coverings to conceal their identity from the audience, judges and other contestants.

The first season of Mask Singer premiered 8 November 2019. Hosted by Camille Combal, it featured TV host and producer Alessandra Sublet, singer Anggun as well as humorists Kev Adams and Jarry on the judging panel. The second season commenced filming in 2020, and aired from 17 October to 28 November 2020 with the same host and panel. The third season started airing on April 1, 2022, and featured the exact same host and panel, along with a surprise fifth judge in costume, a new addition to the series. The fourth season started to air on August 23, 2022, on a weekly prime-time format. The fifth season premiered on April 14, 2023, and the sixth season premiered on May 3, 2024. The seventh season premiered on May 2, 2025, and the eighth season began on September 12, 2025. The ninth season premiered on April 24, 2026.

== Format ==
A group of celebrities compete anonymously on stage, singing in full costumes over a series of episodes. Each episode, a portion of the competitors are paired off into face-off competitions, in which each will perform a song of his/her choice. From each face-off, the panelists and live audience vote: the winner's safe for the week, while the loser is put up for elimination. At the end of the episode, the face-off's losers are then subjected to new votes of the panelists to determine who will not continue. The eliminated singer then enters a special room backstage where it turns its back to the camera, takes off its mask, then turns around to reveal his/her identity to the viewers.

In addition to the singing competition, hints to each masked singer's identity are offered during the show. Pre-taped interviews are given as hints and feature their distorted voices. The panelists are given time to speculate the identity of the singer after the performance and ask them a single question to try and determine their identity.

== Panelists and host ==
Following the announcement of the series, TF1 announced that the judging panel for season 1 would consist of Radio & TV Host Alessandra Sublet, singer Anggun and comedians Kev Adams and Jarry. Said panel remained for seasons 2 and 3. On June 4, 2022, it was announced that three new panellists would join Kev Adams for the fourth season in replacement to Jarry, Alessandra Sublet and Anggun : ventriloquist and stand-up comedian Jeff Panacloc, actress and comedian Chantal Ladesou, and singer-songwriter Vitaa; constituted the new panel of judges for season 4. Ladesou and Vitaa did not return in the fifth season and were replaced by Élodie Frégé and Michèle Bernier. Frégé, Panacloc, and Bernier did not return in the sixth season and were replaced by Inès Reg, Laurent Ruquier, and Ladesou. Reg did not return in the seventh season and was replaced by Élodie Poux. Poux did not return in the eighth season and was replaced by Michaël Youn. In some episodes, there is a guest panelist who joins the main panel after performing a song in costume.

Judges gallery

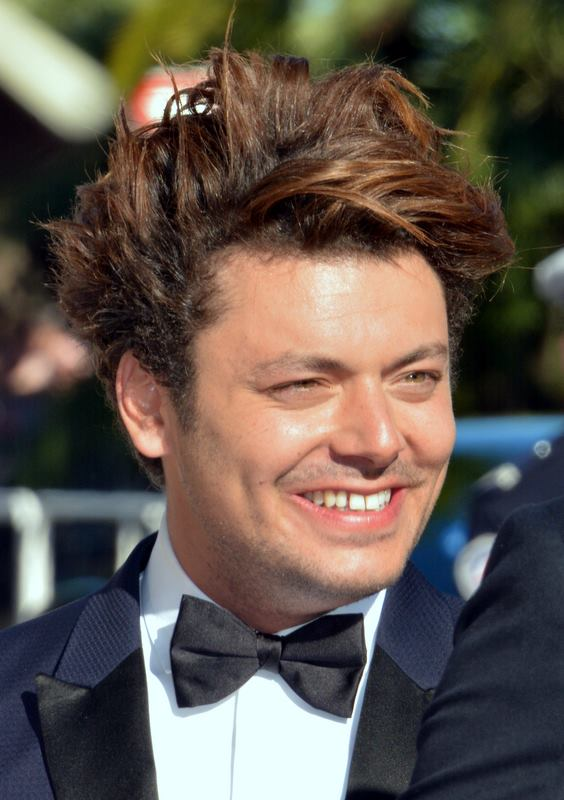
Kev Adams

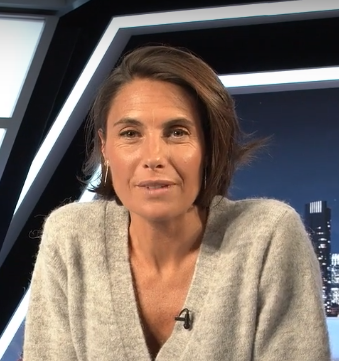
Alessandra Sublet

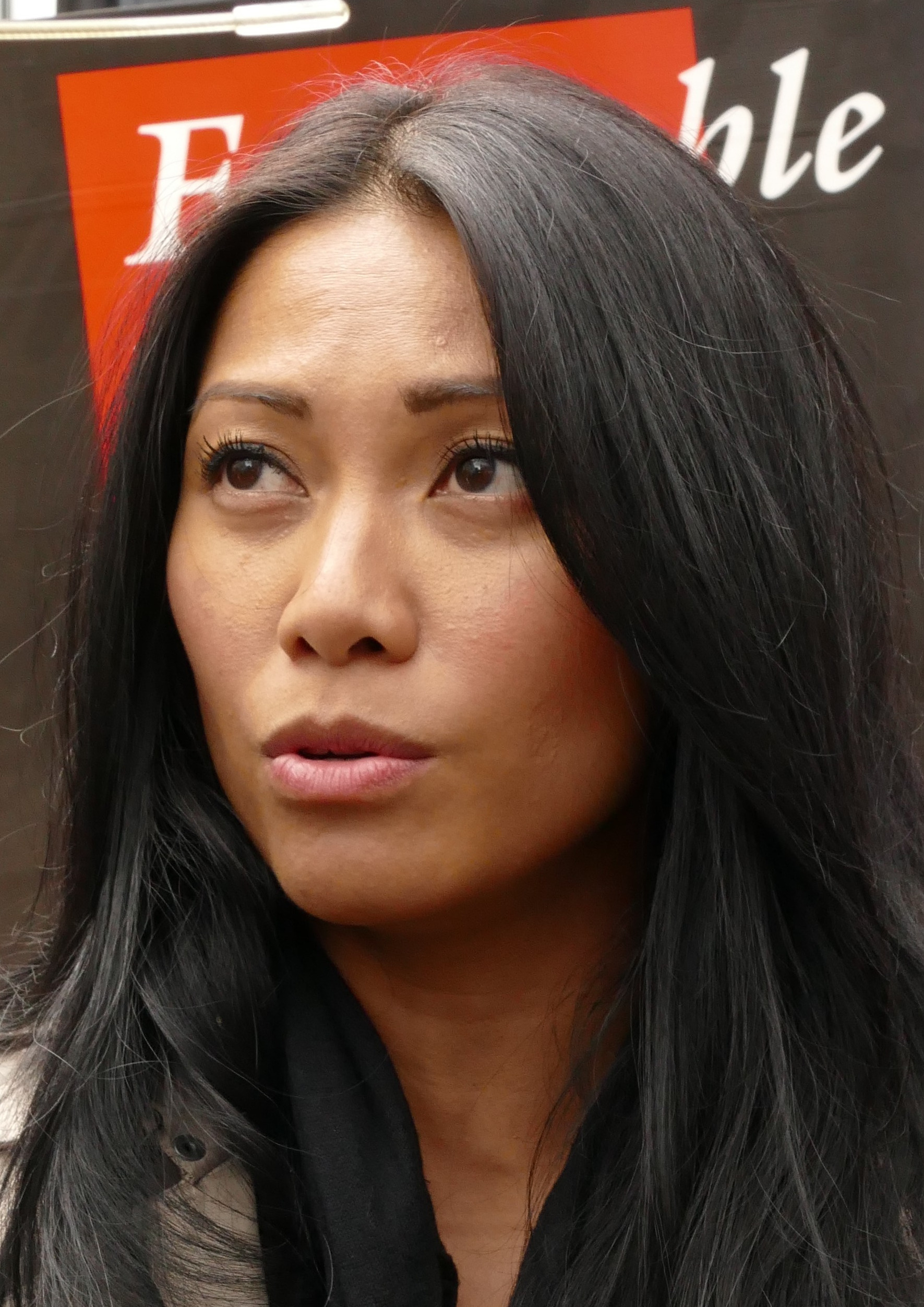
Anggun

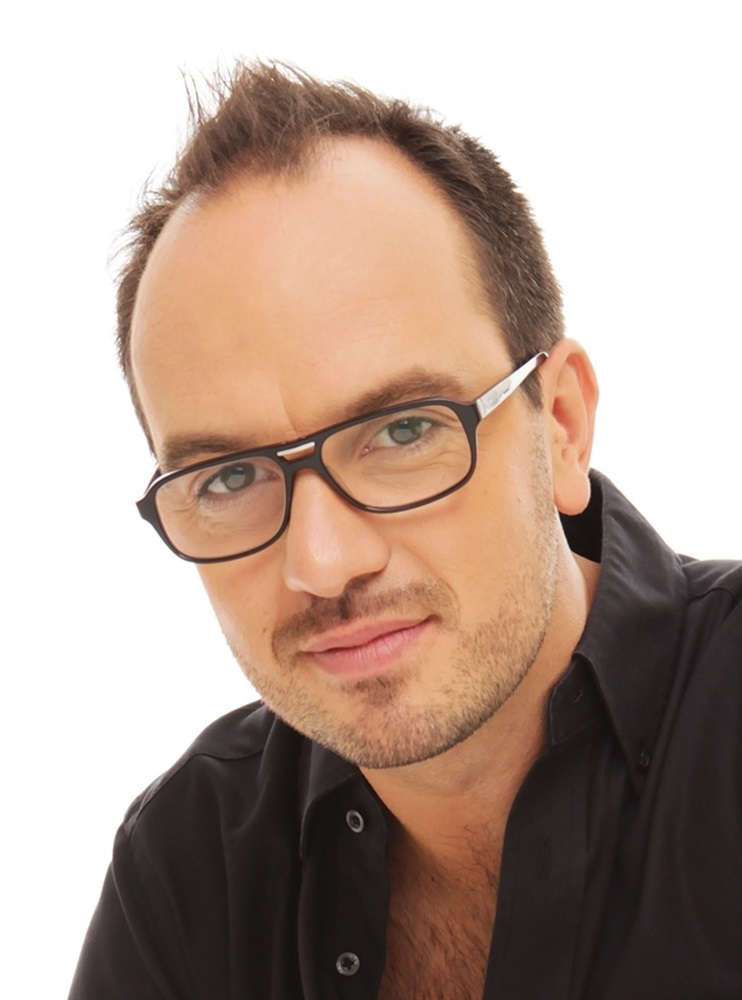
Jarry

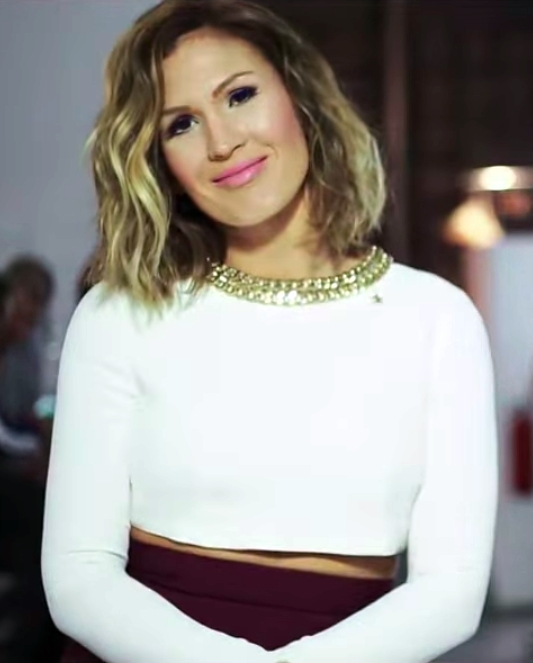
Vitaa

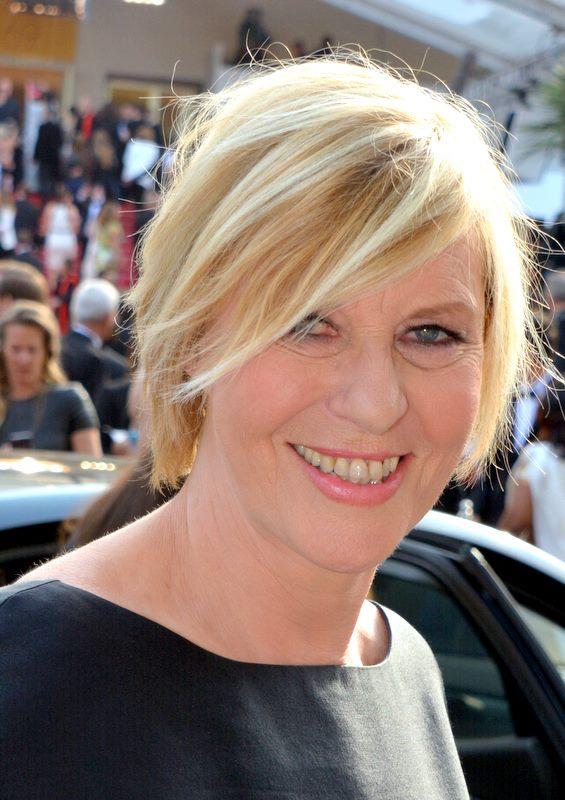
Chantal Ladesou

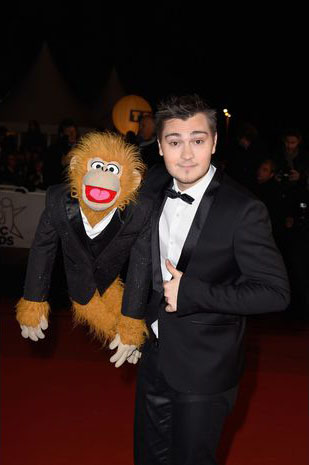
Jeff Panacloc

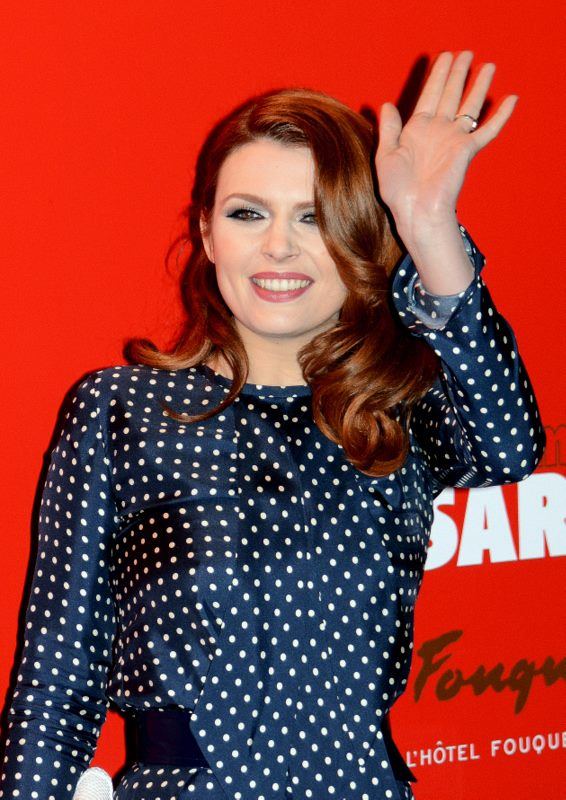
Élodie Frégé

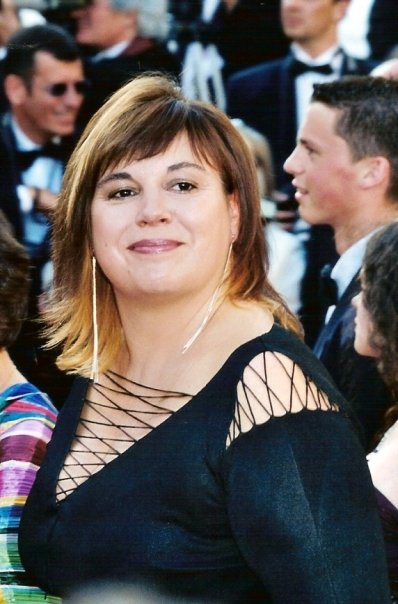
Michèle Bernier

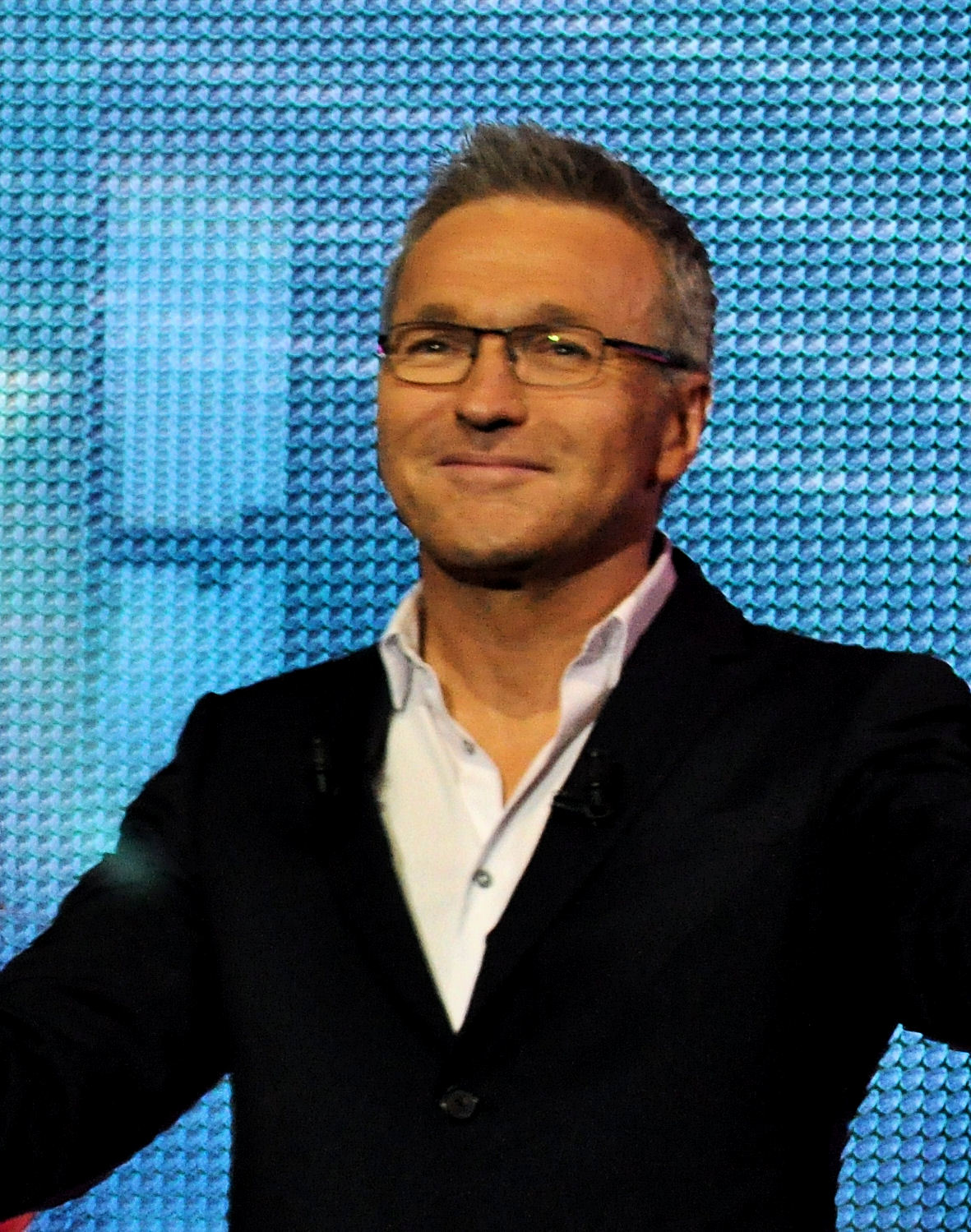
Laurent Ruquier

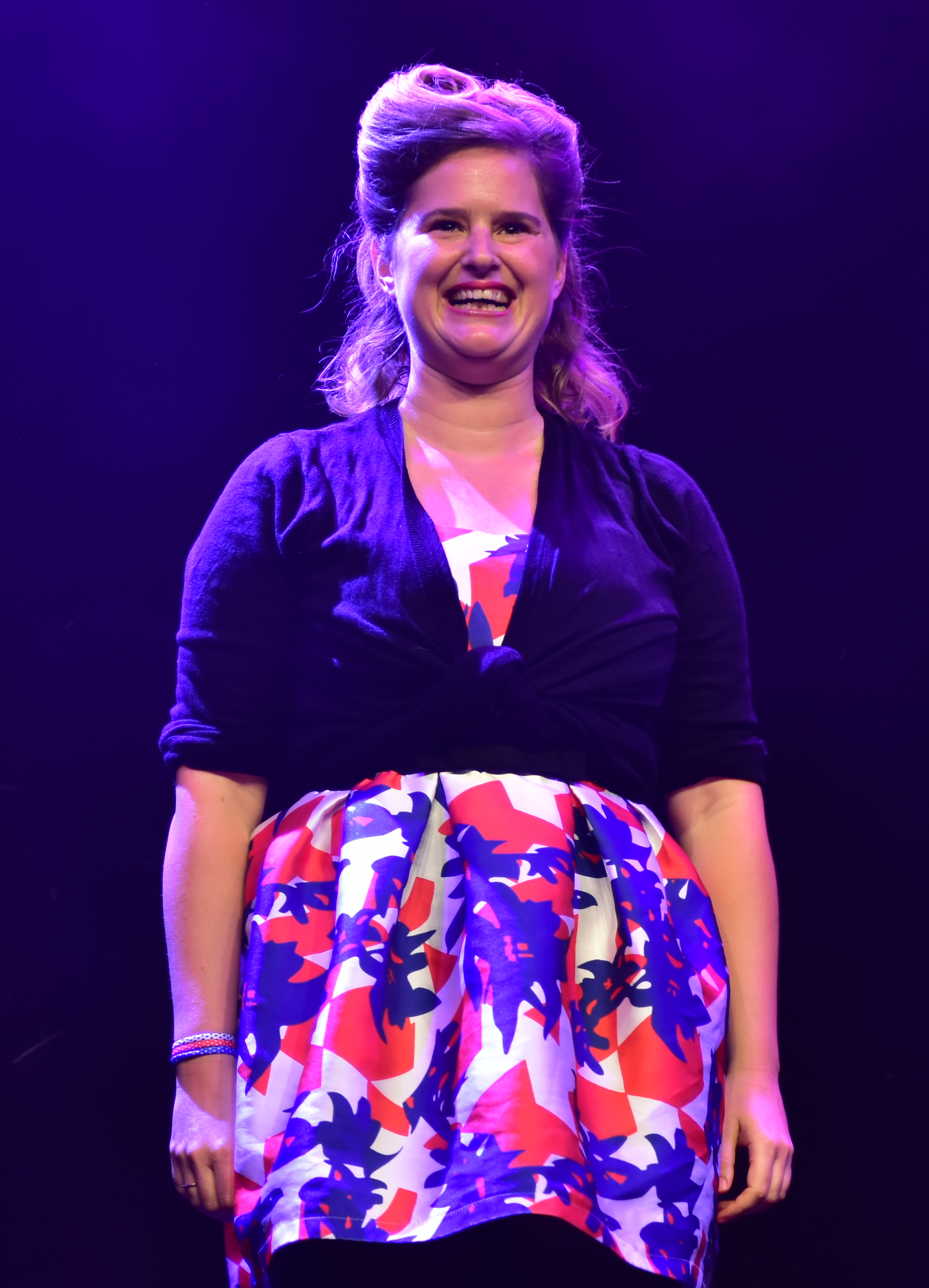
Élodie Poux

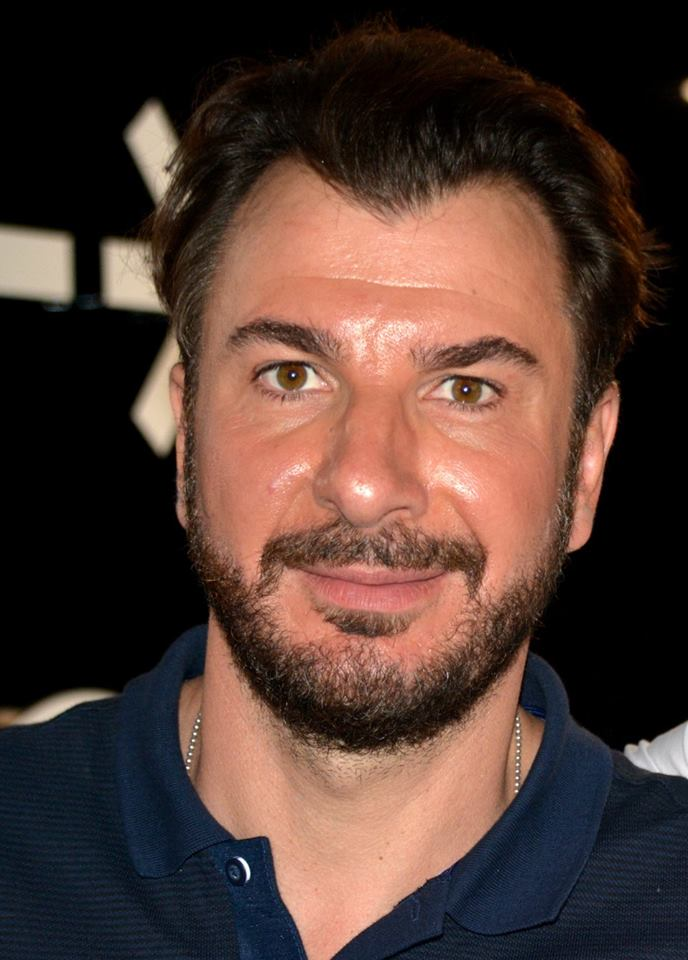
Michaël Youn

== Season synopsis ==
Series overview
Series	Contestants	Episodes	Originally released		Winner	Runner-up	Third place
Series	Contestants	Episodes	First released	Last released	Winner	Runner-up	Third place
1	12	6	8 November 2019	13 December 2019	Laurence Boccolini as "Unicorn"	Karl Zéro as "Eagle"	Julie Zenatti as "Panda"
2	12	6	17 October 2020	28 November 2020	Larusso as "Penguin"	Daniel Lévi as "Robot"	Issa Doumbia as "Dragon"
3	11	7	1 April 2022	13 May 2022	Denitsa Ikonomova as "Butterfly"	Valérie Bègue as "Banana"	Laurent Ournac as "Deer"
4	13	8	23 August 2022	11 October 2022	Amaury Vassili as "Turtle"	Keen'V as "Elephant"	Estelle Mossely as "Bride"
5	13	8	14 April 2023	2 June 2023	Vincent Niclo as "Husky"	Aurélie Konaté as "Doe"	Nico & Daniela Capone as "Camel"
6	13	8	3 May 2024	22 June 2024	Agustín Galiana as "Hippo"	Gérémy Crédeville as "Scarecrow"	Chimène Badi as "Leopard"
7	13	9	2 May 2025	27 June 2025	Lola Dubini as "Giraffe"	PEF as "Cow"	Séverine Ferrer as "Kitten"
8	10	7	12 September 2025	24 October 2025	Ycare as "Rabbit"	Priscilla Betti as "Mole"	Karima Charni as "Lamb"
9	13	9	24 April 2026	27 June 2026	Billy Crawford as "Donkey"	Carla Lazzari as "Chick"	Anisha Jo as "Bouquet"

== Season 1 (2019) ==
=== Contestants ===
Stage Name	Identity	Occupation	Episodes									
Stage Name	Identity	Occupation	1	2	3		4		5		6	
Stage Name	Identity	Occupation	1	2	A	B	A	B	A	B	A	B
Unicorn (Licorne)	Laurence Boccolini	TV presenter	WIN			WIN		WIN	WIN	SAFE	WIN	WINNER
Eagle (Aigle)	Karl Zéro	Television journalist	RISK		WIN			RISK	RISK	SAFE	RISK	RUNNER-UP
Panda	Julie Zenatti	Singer	WIN			WIN	WIN		WIN	SAFE	WIN	THIRD
Peacock (Paon)	Frank Leboeuf	Football player		WIN		RISK	RISK		RISK	SAFE	FINALIST	
Cupcake	Natasha St-Pier	Singer		RISK	WIN		WIN		WIN	OUT		
Lion	David Douillet	Judoka/politician		RISK	RISK			WIN	OUT			
Dino	Yves Lecoq	Comedian		WIN		RISK		OUT				
Bee (Abeille)	Joyce Jonathan	Singer		WIN		WIN	OUT					
Monster (Monstre)	Smaïn	Comedian	WIN			OUT						
Seahorse (Hippocampe)	Lio	Singer/actress	RISK		OUT							
Squirrel (Écureuil)	Sheila	Singer		OUT								
Panther (Panthère)	Marie-José Pérec	Sprinter	OUT									

The masked singer won its face-off and remained in the competition.
The masked singer was eliminated from the competition and unmasked upon elimination.
The masked singer was saved from elimination.
The masked singer did not perform in this episode.

=== Episodes ===
==== Week 1 (8 November) ====
Performances on the first episode
#	Stage name	Song	Result	
1	Unicorn	"Crazy in Love" by Beyonce feat. Jay-Z	WIN	
2	Panther	"Papaoutai" by Stromae	RISK	
3	Panda	"Can't Stop the Feeling!" by Justin Timberlake	WIN	
4	Eagle	"J'aime regarder les filles" by Patrick Coutin	RISK	
5	Monster	"Que je t'aime" by Johnny Hallyday	WIN	
6	Seahorse	"Alright" by Jain	RISK	
Sing-off details			Identity	Result
1	Panther	"Balance ton quoi" by Angèle	Marie-José Pérec	OUT
2	Eagle	"La fille du Père Noël" by Jacques Dutronc	undisclosed	SAFE
3	Seahorse	"Sarà perché ti amo" by Ricchi e Poveri	undisclosed	SAFE

==== Week 2 (15 November) ====
Performances on the second episode
#	Stage name	Song	Result	
1	Bee	"I'm So Excited" by The Pointer Sisters	WIN	
2	Lion	"Sapés comme jamais" by Maître Gims feat. Niska	RISK	
3	Cupcake	"Quelqu'un m'a dit" by Carla Bruni	RISK	
4	Dino	"Cette année-là" by Claude François	WIN	
5	Peacock	"I'm Still Standing" by Elton John	WIN	
6	Squirrel	"Djadja" by Aya Nakamura	RISK	
Sing-off details			Identity	Result
1	Lion	"Everybody Needs Somebody to Love" by The Blues Brothers	undisclosed	SAFE
2	Cupcake	"California Dreamin'" by The Mamas and the Papas	undisclosed	SAFE
3	Squirrel	"Bad Romance" by Lady Gaga	Sheila	OUT

==== Week 3 (22 November) ====
Two singers are to be eliminated this episode. Therefore, Sing-offs are canceled : Contestants sing only once before being subjected to the vote.

- Group Number: "Uptown Funk" by Mark Ronson feat. Bruno Mars

Performances on the third episode
#	Stage name	Song	Identity	Result
1	Cupcake	"Pour que tu m'aimes encore" by Celine Dion	undisclosed	WIN
2	Lion	"We Will Rock You" by Queen	undisclosed	RISK
3	Eagle	"Tous les mêmes" by Stromae	undisclosed	WIN
4	Seahorse	"Lady Marmalade" by Labelle	Lio	OUT

#	Stage name	Song	Identity	Result
1	Bee	"It's Oh So Quiet" by Betty Hutton	undisclosed	WIN
2	Monster	"Je joue de la musique" by Calogero	Smaïn	OUT
3	Peacock	"Le Diable ne s'habille plus en Prada" by Soprano	undisclosed	RISK
4	Unicorn	"Help!" by The Beatles	undisclosed	WIN
5	Dino	"Feel" by Robbie Williams	undisclosed	RISK
6	Panda	"La Boulette" by Diam's	undisclosed	WIN

==== Week 4 (29 November) ====
Two singers are to be eliminated this episode. Therefore, Sing-offs are canceled : Contestants sing only once before being subjected to the vote.

Performances on the fourth episode
#	Stage name	Song	Identity	Result
1	Panda	"Take Me to Church" by Hozier	undisclosed	WIN
2	Bee	"Torn" by Natalie Imbruglia	Joyce Jonathan	OUT
3	Peacock	"Toi et moi contre le monde entier" by Claude François	undisclosed	RISK
4	Cupcake	"I Gotta Feeling" by Black Eyed Peas	undisclosed	WIN

#	Stage name	Song	Identity	Result
5	Eagle	"Le Sud" by Nino Ferrer	undisclosed	RISK
6	Unicorn	"Don't Stop Me Now" by Queen	undisclosed	WIN
7	Lion	"Pas de boogie woogie" by Eddy Mitchell	undisclosed	WIN
8	Dino	"L'Envie" by Johnny Hallyday	Yves Lecoq	OUT

==== Week 5 (6 December) ====
Two singers are to be eliminated this episode. Therefore, Sing-offs are canceled : Contestants sing only once before being subjected to the vote.

Performances on the fifth episode
#	Stage name	Song	Identity	Result
1	Panda	"Single Ladies" by Beyoncé	undisclosed	WIN
2	Peacock	"Tainted Love" by Soft Cell	undisclosed	RISK
3	Lion	"Bella ciao" by Maître Gims	David Douillet	OUT
4	Unicorn	"Si, maman si" by France Gall	undisclosed	WIN
5	Eagle	"Seven Nation Army" by The White Stripes	undisclosed	RISK
6	Cupcake	"Stay with Me" by Sam Smith	undisclosed	WIN

#	Stage name	Song	Identity	Result
1	Panda	"Always Remember Us This Way" by Lady Gaga	undisclosed	SAFE
2	Peacock	"My Way" by Frank Sinatra	undisclosed	SAFE
3	Unicorn	"Bang Bang" by Jessie J feat. Ariana Grande and Nicki Minaj	undisclosed	SAFE
4	Eagle	"Être une femme" by Michel Sardou	undisclosed	SAFE
5	Cupcake	"Call Me Maybe" by Carly Rae Jepsen	Natasha St-Pier	OUT

==== Week 6 (13 December) ====
As only 4 characters are still in competition, run time allows for face-offs again. The 4th place was determined by a first round of duels then a face-off, while the top 3 was determined in a second round.

===== Round One =====
Performances on the final episode – round one
#	Stage name	Song	Result	
1	Eagle	"Alors on danse" by Stromae	RISK	
2	Unicorn	"Total Eclipse of the Heart" by Bonnie Tyler	WIN	
3	Panda	"Firework" by Katy Perry	WIN	
4	Peacock	"La groupie du pianiste" by Michel Berger	RISK	
Sing-off details			Identity	Result
1	Eagle	"I Love Rock 'n' Roll" by Arrows	undisclosed	SAFE
2	Peacock	"Formidable" by Stromae	Frank Leboeuf	OUT

===== Round Two =====
Performances on the final episode – round two
#	Stage name	Song	Identity	Result
1	Unicorn	"Marcia Baïla" by Les Rita Mitsouko	Laurence Boccolini	WINNER
2	Panda	"Un homme heureux" by William Sheller	Julie Zenatti	THIRD
3	Eagle	"Jusqu'à minuit" by Johnny Hallyday	Karl Zéro	RUNNER-UP

== Season 2 (2020) ==
=== Contestants ===
Stage Name	Identity	Occupation	Episodes									
Stage Name	Identity	Occupation	1		2	3		4		5		6
Stage Name	Identity	Occupation	A	B	2	A	B	A	B	A	B	6
Penguin (Manchot)	Larusso	Singer		WIN	WIN		WIN	WIN		SAFE	WIN	WINNER
Robot	Daniel Lévi	Singer	WIN		WIN		WIN	WIN		SAFE	WIN	RUNNER-UP
Dragon	Issa Doumbia	Actor	RISK		WIN	RISK			SAFE	SAFE	RISK	THIRD
Spider (Araignée)	Karine Ferri	TV presenter	WIN		WIN	WIN		RISK		SAFE	OUT	
Shark (Requin)	Basile Boli	Footballer	RISK		RISK		WIN		SAFE	OUT		
Octopus (Pieuvre)	Liane Foly	Singer		RISK	RISK		RISK		OUT			
Skeleton (Squelette)	Djibril Cissé	Footballer	WIN		RISK	WIN		OUT				
Owl (Hibou)	Dave	Singer		RISK	RISK		OUT					
Foxy (Renarde)	Valérie Damidot	TV personality		WIN	WIN	OUT						
Parrots (Perroquets)	Igor and Grichka Bogdanoff	Scientists/TV presenters		WIN	OUT							
Mouth (Bouche)	Frédérique Bel	Actress		OUT								
Wolf (Loup)	Laure Manaudou	Swimmer	OUT									

The masked singer won its face-off and remained in the competition.
The masked singer lost its face-off, but was not eliminated.
The masked singer was eliminated from the competition and unmasked upon elimination.
The masked singer was saved from elimination.
The masked singer did not perform in this episode.

=== Episodes ===
==== Week 1 (17 October) ====
Performances of the first half
#	Stage name	Song	Identity	Result
1	Skeleton	"Can't Hold Us" by Macklemore & Ryan Lewis feat. Ray Dalton	undisclosed	WIN
2	Wolf	"Oui ou non" by Angèle	Laure Manaudou	OUT
3	Shark	"Femme Like U" by K.Maro	undisclosed	RISK
4	Spider	"Can't Get You Out of My Head" by Kylie Minogue	undisclosed	WIN
5	Robot	"September" by Earth, Wind & Fire	undisclosed	WIN
6	Dragon	"Les planètes" by M. Pokora	undisclosed	RISK

Performances of the second half
#	Stage name	Song	Identity	Result
1	Penguin	"Dance Monkey" by Tones and I	undisclosed	WIN
2	Mouth	"F*ck You" by Lily Allen	Frédérique Bel	OUT
3	Owl	"Jailhouse Rock" by Elvis Presley	undisclosed	RISK
4	Parrots	"Bamboléo" by Gipsy Kings	undisclosed	WIN
4	Parrots	"Bamboléo" by Gipsy Kings	undisclosed	WIN
5	Octopus	"Bim bam toi" by Carla Lazzari	undisclosed	RISK
6	Foxy	"My Humps" by Black Eyed Peas	undisclosed	WIN

==== Week 2 (24 October) ====
- Guest Performance: "Million Reasons" by Lady Gaga performed by Itziar Ituño as "Ballerina"

Performances on the second episode
#	Stage name	Song	Identity	Result
1	Octopus	"The Greatest Show" from The Greatest Showman	undisclosed	RISK
2	Robot	"Soulman" by Ben l'Oncle Soul	undisclosed	WIN
3	Owl	"Rolling in the Deep" by Adele	undisclosed	RISK
4	Foxy	"Éblouie par la nuit" by Zaz	undisclosed	WIN
5	Spider	"Sans contrefaçon" by Mylène Farmer	undisclosed	WIN
6	Parrots	"Yesterday" by The Beatles	Igor Bogdanoff	OUT
6	Parrots	"Yesterday" by The Beatles	Grichka Bogdanoff	OUT
7	Dragon	"Pookie" by Aya Nakamura	undisclosed	WIN
8	Skeleton	"Sweet Dreams (Are Made of This)" by Eurythmics	undisclosed	RISK
9	Shark	"Human" by Rag'n'Bone Man	undisclosed	RISK
10	Penguin	"It's Not Unusual" by Tom Jones	undisclosed	WIN

==== Week 3 (31 October) ====
Performances of the first half
#	Stage name	Song	Identity	Result
1	Spider	"La grenade" by Clara Luciani	undisclosed	WIN
2	Dragon	"You Are So Beautiful" by Joe Cocker	undisclosed	RISK
3	Foxy	"Rehab" by Amy Winehouse	Valérie Damidot	OUT
4	Skeleton	"Wake Me Up Before You Go-Go" by Wham!	undisclosed	WIN

Performances of the second half
#	Stage name	Song	Identity	Result
1	Shark	"Le coup de soleil" by Foé	undisclosed	WIN
2	Octopus	"24K Magic" by Bruno Mars	undisclosed	RISK
3	Robot	"All of Me" by John Legend	undisclosed	WIN
4	Penguin	"On the Floor" by Jennifer Lopez feat. Pitbull	undisclosed	WIN
5	Owl	"Ti amo" by Umberto Tozzi	Dave	OUT

==== Week 4 (7 November) ====
- Panelist Performance: "Eye of the Tiger" by Survivor performed by Anggun as "Disco Ball"

Performances of the first half
#	Stage name	Song	Identity	Result
1	Penguin	"J'irai où tu iras" by Celine Dion feat. Jean-Jacques Goldman	undisclosed	WIN
2	Skeleton	"Tombé" by M. Pokora	Djibril Cissé	OUT
3	Robot	"I Will Survive" by Gloria Gaynor	undisclosed	WIN
4	Spider	"Avant toi" by Vitaa and Slimane	undisclosed	RISK

Performances of the second half
#	Stage name	Song	Identity	Result
1	Shark	"Le Coach" by Soprano	undisclosed	SAFE
2	Octopus	"La Vie en rose" by Grace Jones	Liane Foly	OUT
3	Dragon	"On va s'aimer" by Gilbert Montagné	undisclosed	SAFE

==== Week 5 (21 November) ====
- Group Performance: "Allez reste" by Boulevard des Airs feat. Vianney

Performances of the first half
#	Stage name	Song	Identity	Result
1	Spider	"The Show Must Go On" by Queen	undisclosed	SAFE
2	Robot	"Get Lucky" by Daft Punk feat. Pharrell Williams	undisclosed	SAFE
3	Dragon	"Oh Happy Day" by Edwin Hawkins Singers	undisclosed	SAFE
4	Penguin	"Tous les cris les SOS" by Daniel Balavoine	undisclosed	SAFE
5	Shark	"Sex Bomb" by Tom Jones and Mousse T.	Basile Boli	OUT

Performances of the second half
#	Stage name	Song	Result	
1	Robot	"Les yeux de la mama" by Kendji Girac	undisclosed	WIN
2	Dragon	"Ma philosophie" by Amel Bent	undisclosed	RISK
3	Penguin	"Black or White" by Michael Jackson	undisclosed	WIN
4	Spider	"Justify My Love" by Madonna	Karine Ferri	OUT

==== Week 6 (28 November) ====
===== Round One =====
For the first round the contestants did a duet with a previous contestant.

Performances on the final episode – round one
#	Stage name	Song
1	Penguin and Panda	"Shallow" by Lady Gaga and Bradley Cooper
2	Robot and Lion	"Aline" by Christophe
3	Dragon and Cupcake	"J'ai demandé à la Lune" by Indochine

===== Round Two =====
Performances on the final episode – round two
#	Stage name	Song	Identity	Result
1	Penguin	"Shake It Off" by Taylor Swift	undisclosed	SAFE
2	Robot	"Avec le temps" by Léo Ferré	undisclosed	SAFE
3	Dragon	"Stach Stach" by Bratisla Boys	Issa Doumbia	THIRD

===== Round Three =====
Performances on the final episode – round three
#	Stage name	Song	Identity	Result
1	Penguin	"La Bohème" by Charles Aznavour	Larusso	WINNER
2	Robot	"Don't You Worry 'bout a Thing" by Stevie Wonder	Daniel Lévi	RUNNER-UP

== Season 3 (2022) ==
=== Contestants ===
Stage Name	Identity	Occupation	Episodes								
Stage Name	Identity	Occupation	1		2	3		4	5	6	7
Stage Name	Identity	Occupation	A	B	2	A	B	4	5	6	7
Butterfly (Papillon)	Denitsa Ikonomova	Dancer		WIN	RISK		RISK	WIN	WIN	WIN	WINNER
Banana (Banane)	Valérie Bègue	TV personality/Miss France 2008	RISK		WIN	WIN		WIN	WIN	WIN	RUNNER-UP
Deer (Cerf)	Laurent Ournac	Comedian	WIN		RISK	WIN		RISK	WIN	RISK	THIRD
Tree (Arbre)	Gilbert Montagné	Singer		WIN	WIN		WIN	WIN	RISK	OUT	
Crocodile (Croco)	Marc-Antoine Le Bret	Imitator	WIN		WIN		WIN	RISK	OUT		
Pig (Cochon)	Yves Camdeborde	Chef		RISK	RISK	RISK		OUT			
Chameleon (Caméléon)	Sylvie Tellier	TV personality	RISK		WIN		OUT				
Cosmonaut (Cosmonaute)	Pierre Palmade	Actor	WIN		WIN	OUT					
Tigress (Tigresse)	Marc-Antoine Le Bret	Imitator		WIN	OUT						
Coral Fish (Poisson Corail)	Maud Fontenoy	Sailor		OUT							
Hermit Crab (Bernard L'Hermite)	Alain Bernard	Swimmer	OUT								

The masked singer won its face-off and remained in the competition.
The masked singer lost its face-off, but was not eliminated.
The masked singer was eliminated from the competition and unmasked upon elimination.
The masked singer was saved from elimination.
The masked singer did not perform in this episode.

=== Episodes ===
==== Week 1 (1 April) ====
Performances of the first half
#	Stage name	Song	Identity	Result
1	Banana	"Born This Way" by Lady Gaga	undisclosed	RISK
2	Cosmonaut	"Space Oddity" by David Bowie	undisclosed	WIN
3	Hermit Crab	"Dis-moi" by BB Brunes	Alain Bernard	OUT
4	Deer	"Creep" by Radiohead	undisclosed	WIN
5	Chameleon	"Blinding Lights" by The Weeknd	undisclosed	RISK
6	Crocodile	"Je danse le Mia" by IAM	undisclosed	WIN

Performances of the second half
#	Stage name	Song	Identity	Result
1	Tree	"Hakuna Matata" by Elton John & Tim Rice	undisclosed	WIN
2	Pig	"Mexico" by Luis Mariano	undisclosed	RISK
3	Coral Fish	"Dis, quand reviendras‐tu ?" by Barbara	Maud Fontenoy	OUT
4	Butterfly	"Waka Waka (This Time for Africa)" by Shakira feat. Freshlyground	undisclosed	WIN
5	Tigress	"La Javanaise" by Serge Gainsbourg	undisclosed	WIN

==== Week 2 (8 April) ====
- Guest Performance: "Feeling Good" by Nina Simone performed by Teri Hatcher as "Ladybug"

Performances on the second episode
#	Stage name	Song	Identity	Result
1	Tigress	"Tu m'oublieras" by Larusso	Marc-Antoine Le Bret	OUT
2	Tree	"What a Wonderful World" by Louis Armstrong	undisclosed	WIN
3	Pig	"Mourir sur scène" by Dalida	undisclosed	RISK
4	Banana	"Wrecking Ball" by Miley Cyrus	undisclosed	WIN
5	Cosmonaut	"Si t'étais là" by Louane	undisclosed	WIN
6	Deer	"There's Nothing Holdin' Me Back" by Shawn Mendes	undisclosed	RISK
7	Crocodile	"Louxor, j'adore" by Philippe Katerine	undisclosed	WIN
8	Butterfly	"Fever" by Dua Lipa & Angèle	undisclosed	RISK
9	Chameleon	"Désenchantée" by Mylène Farmer	undisclosed	WIN

==== Week 3 (15 April) ====
Performances of the first half
#	Stage name	Song	Identity	Result
1	Deer	"Lose Yourself" by Eminem	undisclosed	WIN
2	Pig	"Quelque chose de Tennessee" by Johnny Hallyday	undisclosed	RISK
3	Banana	"Don't Stop the Music" by Rihanna	undisclosed	WIN
4	Cosmonaut	"Le temps qui court" by Alliage	Pierre Palmade	OUT

Performances of the second half
#	Stage name	Song	Identity	Result
1	Chameleon	"Résiste" by France Gall	Sylvie Tellier	OUT
2	Tree	"Fresh" by Kool & the Gang	undisclosed	WIN
3	Butterfly	"Moi... Lolita" by Alizée	undisclosed	RISK
4	Crocodile	"Comic Strip" by Serge Gainsbourg	undisclosed	WIN

==== Week 4 (22 April) ====
- Guest Performance: "Le Banana Split" by Lio performed by Anne Roumanoff as "Gorilla"
- Panelist Performance: "Envole-moi" by Jean-Jacques Goldman performed by Jarry as "Elephant"

Performances on the fourth episode
#	Stage name	Song	Identity	Result
1	Deer	"À fleur de toi" by Vitaa	undisclosed	RISK
2	Butterfly	"Survivor" by Destiny's Child	undisclosed	WIN
3	Banana	"Je vole" by Michel Sardou	undisclosed	WIN
4	Crocodile	"Fan" by Pascal Obispo	undisclosed	RISK
5	Pig	"Je suis malade" by Serge Lama	Yves Camdeborde	OUT
6	Tree	"Ma révolution" by Jenifer	undisclosed	WIN

==== Week 5 (29 April) ====
- Group Performance: "Ça (C'est Vraiment Toi)" by Téléphone
- Guest Performance: "With or Without You" by U2 performed by Seal as "Cowboy"

Performances on the fifth episode
#	Stage name	Song	Identity	Result
1	Banana	"If I Ain't Got You" by Alicia Keys	undisclosed	WIN
2	Deer	"Moves like Jagger" by Maroon 5 feat. Christina Aguilera	undisclosed	WIN
3	Crocodile	"Mistral gagnant" by Renaud	Marc-Antoine Le Bret	OUT
4	Tree	"En apesanteur" by Calogero	undisclosed	RISK
5	Butterfly	"Physical" by Dua Lipa	undisclosed	WIN

==== Week 6 (6 May) ====
- Guest Performance: "Pauvres Diables" by Julio Iglesias performed by Kendji Girac as "Wolf"

Performances on the sixth episode
#	Stage name	Song	Identity	Result
1	Butterfly	"Wannabe" by Spice Girls	undisclosed	WIN
2	Deer	"Someone You Loved" by Lewis Capaldi	undisclosed	RISK
3	Banana	"Quand on arrive en ville" by Daniel Balavoine and Nanette Workman	undisclosed	WIN
4	Tree	"I Kissed a Girl" by Katy Perry	Gilbert Montagné	OUT

==== Week 7 (13 May) ====
===== Round One =====
For the first round the contestants did a duet with a previous contestant.

Performances on the final episode – round one
#	Stage name	Song
1	Deer and Penguin	"Chandelier" by Sia
2	Banana and Robot	"I Want You Back" by The Jackson 5
3	Butterfly and Spider	"Je sais pas" by Celine Dion

===== Round Two =====
Performances on the final episode – round two
#	Stage name	Song	Identity	Result
1	Deer	"Allumer le feu" by Johnny Hallyday	Laurent Ournac	THIRD
2	Banana	"Hurt" by Christina Aguilera	undisclosed	SAFE
3	Butterfly	"Walking on Sunshine" by Katrina and the Waves	undisclosed	SAFE

===== Round Three =====
Performances on the final episode – round three
#	Stage name	Song	Identity	Result
1	Banana	"Je te promets" by Johnny Hallyday	Valérie Bègue	RUNNER-UP
2	Butterfly	"Smells Like Teen Spirit" by Nirvana	Denitsa Ikonomova	WINNER

== Season 4 (2022) ==
=== Contestants ===
Stage Name	Identity	Occupation	Episodes										
Stage Name	Identity	Occupation	1		2		3	4		5	6	7	8
Stage Name	Identity	Occupation	A	B	A	B	3	A	B	5	6	7	8
Turtle (Tortue)	Amaury Vassili	Opera singer			WIN		WIN		WIN	WIN	WIN	WIN	WINNER
Elephant (Éléphant)	Keen'V	Singer		WIN			RISK	WIN		WIN	WIN	RISK	RUNNER-UP
Bride (Mariée)	Estelle Mossely	Boxer			WIN		WIN		WIN	RISK	WIN	WIN	THIRD
Monkey (Singe)	Alizée	Singer				WIN	WIN	WIN		WIN	RISK	OUT	
Bear (Ours) (WC)	Christophe Beaugrand	TV presenter						RISK	RISK	WIN	OUT		
Knight (Chevalier)	Laurent Maistret	Model				WIN	WIN	RISK		OUT			
Pharaoh (Pharaon)	Francis Huster	Actor		WIN			RISK		OUT				
Dalmatian (Dalmatien)	Christelle Chollet	Comedian	WIN				RISK	OUT					
Mouse (Souris)	Laëtitia Milot	Actress	WIN				OUT						
Genie (Génie)	Yoann Riou	Journalist				OUT							
Koala	Marion Bartoli	Tennis player			OUT								
Gingerbread (Pain d'épices)	Frédéric Diefenthal	Actor		OUT									
Baby (Bébé)	Marianne James	Singer	OUT										

The masked singer won its face-off and remained in the competition.
The masked singer lost its face-off, but was not eliminated.
The masked singer was eliminated from the competition and unmasked upon elimination.
The masked singer was saved from elimination.
The masked singer did not perform in this episode.

=== Episodes ===
==== Week 1 (23 August) ====
Performances on the first half
#	Stage name	Song		
1	Dalmatian	"Highway to Hell" by AC/DC		
2	Baby	"Mon papa à moi est un gangster" by Stomy Bugsy		
3	Mouse	"Sparkling Diamonds" by Nicole Kidman		
Sing-off details			Identity	Result
1	Dalmatian	"Ma gueule" by Johnny Hallyday	undisclosed	WIN
2	Baby	"Blue Suede Shoes" by Elvis Presley	Marianne James	OUT
3	Mouse	"Libérée, délivrée" by Anaïs Delva	undisclosed	WIN

Performances on the second half
#	Stage name	Song		
1	Gingerbread	"Ça plane pour moi" by Plastic Bertrand		
2	Pharaoh	"Mesdames" by Grand Corps Malade		
3	Elephant	"Le blues du businessman" by Claude Dubois		
Sing-off details			Identity	Result
1	Gingerbread	"Message personnel" by Françoise Hardy	Frédéric Diefenthal	OUT
2	Elephant	"Dieu m'a donné la foi" by Ophélie Winter	undisclosed	WIN
3	Pharaoh	"Les Feuilles mortes" by Yves Montand	undisclosed	WIN

==== Week 2 (30 August) ====
Performances on the first half
#	Stage name	Song		
1	Bride	"Aimer jusqu'à l'impossible" by Tina Arena		
2	Turtle	"Over the Rainbow" by Israel Kamakawiwoʻole		
3	Koala	"Best Life" by Naps feat. Gims		
Sing-off details			Identity	Result
1	Bride	"Diamonds" by Rihanna	undisclosed	WIN
2	Turtle	"Titanium" by David Guetta feat. Sia	undisclosed	WIN
3	Koala	"Umbrella" by Rihanna	Marion Bartoli	OUT

Performances on the second half
#	Stage name	Song		
1	Genie	"Gangnam Style" by PSY		
2	Monkey	"Proud Mary" by Creedence Clearwater Revival		
3	Knight	"Maniac" by Michael Sembello		
Sing-off details			Identity	Result
1	Genie	"Sensualité" by Axelle Red	Yoann Riou	OUT
2	Monkey	"La Groupie du pianiste" by Michel Berger	undisclosed	WIN
3	Knight	"Elle a les yeux revolver..." by Marc Lavoine	undisclosed	WIN

==== Week 3 (6 September) ====
- Guest Performance: "My Way" by Frank Sinatra performed by David Hasselhoff as "Cobra"

Performances on the third episode
#	Stage name	Song	Identity	Result
1	Elephant	"I'm Outta Love" by Anastacia	undisclosed	RISK
2	Turtle	"Corps" by Yseult	undisclosed	WIN
3	Monkey	"Toxic" by Britney Spears	undisclosed	WIN
4	Pharaoh	"For Me Formidable" by Charles Aznavour	undisclosed	RISK
5	Knight	"Nuit de folie" by Début de Soirée	undisclosed	WIN
6	Dalmatian	"All by Myself" by Celine Dion	undisclosed	RISK
7	Bride	"When I Was Your Man" by Bruno Mars	undisclosed	WIN
8	Mouse	"Encore un soir" by Celine Dion	Laëtitia Milot	OUT

==== Week 4 (13 September) ====
- Guest Panelist: Tom Villa as "Spy"

Performances on the fourth episode
#	Stage name	Song	Identity	Result
1	Knight	"Take On Me" by A-ha	undisclosed	RISK
2	Monkey	"Ma révérence" by Véronique Sanson	undisclosed	WIN
3	Dalmatian	"It's Raining Men" by The Weather Girls	Christelle Chollet	OUT
4	Elephant	"S'il suffisait d'aimer" by Celine Dion	undisclosed	WIN
Wildcard	Bear	"Love Me Tender" by Elvis Presley	undisclosed	RISK
6	Bride	"L'Aziza" by Daniel Balavoine	undisclosed	WIN
7	Turtle	"Beat It" by Michael Jackson	undisclosed	WIN
8	Pharaoh	"Il est où le bonheur" by Christophe Maé	Francis Huster	OUT
Wildcard	Bear	"Le Dernier Jour du disco" by Juliette Armanet	undisclosed	RISK

==== Week 5 (20 September) ====
- Group Performance: "Quand la musique est bonne" by Jean-Jacques Goldman
- Guest Performance: "Let's Twist Again" by Chubby Checker performed by Francis Huster" as "Viking"
- Guest Reveal: Michel Ansault as "Plot"

Performances on the fifth episode
#	Stage name	Song	Identity	Result
1	Turtle	"Mourir demain" by Natasha St-Pier & Pascal Obispo	undisclosed	WIN
1	Monkey	"Mourir demain" by Natasha St-Pier & Pascal Obispo	undisclosed	WIN
2	Knight	"Bye Bye" by Ménélik & Médina Koné	Laurent Maistret	OUT
2	Bride	"Bye Bye" by Ménélik & Médina Koné	undisclosed	RISK
3	Elephant	"Manhattan-Kaboul" by Renaud & Axelle Red	undisclosed	WIN
3	Bear	"Manhattan-Kaboul" by Renaud & Axelle Red	undisclosed	WIN

==== Week 6 (27 September) ====
- Guest Performance: "Price Tag" by Jessie J feat. B.o.B performed by Tori Spelling as "Cat"

Performances on the sixth episode
#	Stage name	Song	Identity	Result
1	Turtle	"Si seulement je pouvais lui manquer" by Calogero	undisclosed	WIN
2	Bear	"Born to Be Alive" by Patrick Hernandez	Christophe Beaugrand	OUT
3	Elephant	"Les Mots bleus" by Christophe	undisclosed	WIN
4	Monkey	"DJ" by Diam's	undisclosed	RISK
5	Bride	"Read All About It" by Emeli Sandé	undisclosed	WIN

==== Week 7 (4 October) ====
- Guest Performance: "La Boîte de jazz" by Michel Jonasz performed by Inès Reg as "Tigress"

Performances on the seventh episode
#	Stage name	Song	Identity	Result
1	Elephant	"Roxanne" by The Police	undisclosed	RISK
2	Bride	"Il avait les mots" by Sheryfa Luna	undisclosed	WIN
3	Turtle	"Hello" by Adele	undisclosed	WIN
4	Monkey	"Like a Virgin" by Madonna	Alizée	OUT

==== Week 8 (11 October) ====
===== Round One =====
Performances on the final episode – round one
#	Stage name	Song	Identity	Result
1	Elephant and Banana	"Beggin'" by Madcon	undisclosed	SAFE
2	Bride and Deer	"Skyfall" by Adele	Estelle Mossely	THIRD
3	Turtle and Butterfly	"Happy" by Pharrell Williams	undisclosed	SAFE

===== Round Two =====
Performances on the final episode – round two
#	Stage name	Song	Identity	Result
1	Elephant	"Say You Won't Let Go" by James Arthur	Keen'V	RUNNER-UP
2	Turtle	"Writing's on the Wall" by Sam Smith	Amaury Vassili	WINNER

== Season 5 (2023) ==
=== Contestants ===
Stage Name	Identity	Occupation	Episodes										
Stage Name	Identity	Occupation	1		2		3	4	5		6	7	8
Stage Name	Identity	Occupation	A	B	A	B	3	4	A	B	6	7	8
Husky	Vincent Niclo	Tenor			WIN		WIN	BEST	IMM		WIN	WIN	WINNER
Doe (Biche)	Aurélie Konaté	Actress/singer	WIN				WIN	SAFE		WIN	RISK	WIN	RUNNER-UP
Camel (Chameau)	Nico & Daniela Capone	TikTok influencers		WIN			RISK	SAFE		WIN	WIN	RISK	THIRDS
Jellyfish (Méduse)	Charlotte Gaccio	Actress			WIN		RISK	SAFE	WIN		WIN	OUT	
Carnivorous Plant (Plante Carnivore) (WC)	Tina Arena	Singer							RISK	RISK	OUT		
Witch (Sorcière)	Zaho	Singer	WIN				WIN	SAFE		OUT			
Alien	Adeline Toniutti	Singer		WIN			RISK	SAFE	OUT				
Zebra (Zèbre)	Cartman	Comedian				WIN	WIN	OUT					
Phoenix (Phénix)	Anny Duperey	Actress				WIN	OUT						
Llama (Lama)	Jean-Marc Généreux	Choreographer				OUT							
Caterpillar (Chenille)	André Bouchet	TV personality			OUT								
Duck (Canard)	Laura Flessel-Colovic	Fencer/politician		OUT									
Vulture (Vautour)	Martin Lamotte	Comedian	OUT										

The masked singer won its face-off and remained in the competition.
The masked singer lost its face-off, but was not eliminated.
The masked singer was eliminated from the competition and unmasked upon elimination.
The masked singer was saved from elimination.
The masked singer did not perform in this episode.

=== Episodes ===
==== Week 1 (14 April) ====
Performances on the first half
#	Stage name	Song		
1	Doe	"I Have Nothing" by Whitney Houston		
2	Vulture	"Dès que le vent soufflera" by Renaud		
3	Witch	"L'Enfer" by Stromae		
Sing-off details			Identity	Result
1	Doe	"Sax" by Fleur East	undisclosed	WIN
2	Vulture	"Ma liberté de penser" by Florent Pagny	Martin Lamotte	OUT
3	Witch	"Zombie" by The Cranberries	undisclosed	WIN

Performances on the second half
#	Stage name	Song		
1	Camel	"Parle à ma main" by Fatal Bazooka feat. Yelle		
2	Alien	"Paparazzi" by Lady Gaga		
3	Duck	"Je veux" by Zaz		
Sing-off details			Identity	Result
1	Camel	"Aïcha" by Khaled	undisclosed	WIN
2	Alien	"Diva Dance" from The Fifth Element	undisclosed	WIN
3	Duck	"Je vole" by Louane	Laura Flessel-Colovic	OUT

==== Week 2 (21 April) ====
Performances on the first half
#	Stage name	Song		
1	Jellyfish	"Partir là-bas" from The Little Mermaid		
2	Husky	"Machistador" by -M-		
3	Caterpillar	"Vivre pour le meilleur" by Johnny Hallyday		
Sing-off details			Identity	Result
1	Jellyfish	"Flashdance... What a Feeling" by Irene Cara	undisclosed	WIN
2	Caterpillar	"Papillon de lumière" by Cindy Sander	André Bouchet	OUT
3	Husky	"...Baby One More Time" by Britney Spears	undisclosed	WIN

Performances on the second half
#	Stage name	Song		
1	Llama	"Hound Dog" / "A Little Less Conversation" / "Only You" / "Viva Las Vegas" by Elvis Presley		
2	Phoenix	"María" by Ricky Martin		
3	Zebra	"As It Was" by Harry Styles		
Sing-off details			Identity	Result
1	Llama	"Hélène" by Roch Voisine	Jean-Marc Généreux	OUT
2	Phoenix	"Un garçon pas comme les autres (Ziggy)" by Celine Dion	undisclosed	WIN
3	Zebra	"Paris-Seychelles" by Julien Doré	undisclosed	WIN

==== Week 3 (28 April) ====
- Guest Performance: "Roar" by Katy Perry performed by Mel B as "Sun"

Performances on the third episode
#	Stage name	Song	Identity	Result
1	Husky	"Lucie" by Pascal Obispo	undisclosed	WIN
2	Camel	"Les Sunlights des tropiques" by Gilbert Montagné	undisclosed	RISK
3	Jellyfish	"Je t'aimais, je t'aime, je t'aimerai" by Francis Cabrel	undisclosed	RISK
4	Witch	"Thriller" by Michael Jackson	undisclosed	WIN
5	Alien	"Pourvu qu'elles soient douces" by Mylène Farmer	undisclosed	RISK
6	Zebra	"All Night Long" by Lionel Richie	undisclosed	WIN
7	Doe	"Et bam" by Mentissa	undisclosed	WIN
8	Phoenix	"Historia de un amor" by Luz Casal	Anny Duperey	OUT

==== Week 4 (5 May) ====
- Guest Performance: "Attention mesdames et messieurs" by Michel Fugain performed by Laurent Ruquier as "Lobster"

Performances on the fourth episode
#	Stage name	Song	Identity	Result
1	Doe	"All I Want For Christmas Is You" by Mariah Carey	undisclosed	SAFE
2	Zebra	"Savoir aimer" by Florent Pagny	Cartman	OUT
3	Husky	"When Love Takes Over" by David Guetta feat. Kelly Rowland	undisclosed	BEST
4	Witch	"Quand on n'a que l'amour" by Jacques Brel	undisclosed	SAFE
5	Jellyfish	"Someone Like You" by Adele	undisclosed	SAFE
6	Alien	"Freed From Desire" by Gala	undisclosed	SAFE
7	Camel	"Ce rêve bleu" from Aladdin	undisclosed	SAFE

==== Week 5 (12 May) ====
Performances on the fifth episode
#	Stage name	Song	Identity	Result
1	Jellyfish	"Toutes les femmes de ta vie" by L5	undisclosed	WIN
2	Alien	"Ne me quitte pas" by Jacques Brel	Adeline Toniutti	OUT
Wildcard	Carnivorous Plant	"I Aint Worried" by OneRepublic	undisclosed	RISK
3	Camel	"Sarà perché ti amo" by Ricchi e Poveri	undisclosed	WIN
4	Doe	"Calling You" by Jevetta Steele	undisclosed	WIN
5	Witch	"J't'emmène au vent" by Louise Attaque	Zaho	OUT
Wildcard	Carnivorous Plant	"La Fama" by Rosalía feat. The Weeknd	undisclosed	RISK

==== Week 6 (19 May) ====
- Guest Performance: "Don't Let the Sun Go Down on Me" by Elton John performed by Anastacia as "Kangaroo"

Performances on the sixth episode
#	Stage name	Song	Identity	Result
1	Husky	"Purple Rain" by Prince	undisclosed	WIN
2	Doe	"J'irai où tu iras" by Celine Dion feat. Jean-Jacques Goldman	undisclosed	RISK
3	Carnivorous Plant	"Le vent nous portera" by Sophie Hunger	Tina Arena	OUT
4	Camel	"Les Démons de minuit" by Images	undisclosed	WIN
5	Jellyfish	"Si t'étais là" by Louane	undisclosed	WIN

==== Week 7 (26 May) ====
- Group Performance: "J'ai cherché" by Amir
- Guest Performance: "Grenade" by Bruno Mars performed by Anggun as "Bull"

Performances on the seventh episode
#	Stage name	Song	Identity	Result
1	Doe	"Vole" by Celine Dion	undisclosed	WIN
2	Jellyfish	"Chanson sur ma drôle de vie" by Véronique Sanson	Charlotte Gaccio	OUT
3	Camel	"Paroles, paroles" by Alain Delon & Dalida	undisclosed	RISK
4	Husky	"Elle me dit" by MIKA	undisclosed	WIN

==== Week 8 (2 June) ====
- Guest Group Performance: "J'ai vu" by Niagara performed by Laurent Maistret as Knight, Keen'V as Elephant and Amaury Vassili as Turtle

===== Round One =====
Performances on the final episode – round one
#	Stage name	Song	Identity	Result
1	Husky and Elephant	"Casser la voix" by Patrick Bruel	undisclosed	SAFE
2	Doe and Knight	"Fich’ le camp Jack" by Richard Anthony	undisclosed	SAFE
3	Camel and Turtle	"Sous le vent" by Garou & Celine Dion	Nico & Daniela Capone	THIRDS

===== Round Two =====
Performances on the final episode – round two
#	Stage name	Song	Identity	Result
1	Husky	"Diego libre dans sa tête" by Johnny Hallyday	Vincent Niclo	WINNER
2	Doe	"Où je vais" by Amel Bent	Aurélie Konaté	RUNNER-UP

== Season 6 (2024) ==
=== Contestants ===
Stage Name	Identity	Occupation	Episodes										
Stage Name	Identity	Occupation	1		2		3	4		5	6	7	8
Stage Name	Identity	Occupation	A	B	A	B	3	A	B	5	6	7	8
Hippo (Hippopotame)	Agustín Galiana	Actor/singer		WIN			RISK		WIN	WIN	WIN	WIN	WINNER
Scarecrow (Épouvantail)	Gérémy Crédeville	Comedian				WIN	RISK		WIN	WIN	WIN	RISK	RUNNER-UP
Leopard (Léopard)	Chimène Badi	Singer	WIN				WIN	WIN		WIN	RISK	WIN	THIRD
Pearl (Perle)	Sheryfa Luna	Singer	WIN				WIN	WIN		WIN	WIN	OUT	
Geishamurai (Geishamouraï)	Florent Mothe	Singer		WIN			WIN		RISK	RISK	OUT		
Dragonfly (Libellule)	Inès Vandamme	Dancer			WIN		WIN		RISK	OUT			
Wig (Perruque) (WC)	Ladybug (Anouck Hautbois)	Cartoon character						RISK	OUT				
Robobunny (Robolapin)	Raphaël Mezrahi	Comedian				WIN	RISK	OUT					
Hand (Main)	La Compagnie Créole	Pop Band			WIN		OUT						
Lemur (Lémurien)	Catherine Lara	Singer/violinist				OUT							
Pickle (Cornichon)	Vincent Desagnat	Actor			OUT								
Popcorn	Chantal Goya	Singer/actress		OUT									
Hamster	Jacques Legros	Journalist	OUT										

The masked singer won its face-off and remained in the competition.
The masked singer lost its face-off, but was not eliminated.
The masked singer was eliminated from the competition and unmasked upon elimination.
The masked singer was saved from elimination.
The masked singer did not perform in this episode.

=== Episodes ===
==== Week 1 (3 May) ====
Performances on the first half
#	Stage name	Song		
1	Leopard	"Tattoo" by Loreen		
2	Hamster	"Papaoutai" by Stromae		
3	Pearl	"Parle-moi" by Isabelle Boulay		
Sing-off details			Identity	Result
1	Leopard	"Mon cœur" by Izïa	undisclosed	WIN
2	Hamster	"Message personnel" by Françoise Hardy	Jacques Legros	OUT
3	Pearl	"Rue de la paix" by Zazie	undisclosed	WIN

Performances on the second half
#	Stage name	Song		
1	Geishamurai	"J'en rêve encore" by Gérald de Palmas		
2	Hippo	"Crazy in Love" by Beyoncé & Jay-Z		
3	Popcorn	"Y a d'la joie" by Charles Trenet		
Sing-off details			Identity	Result
1	Geishamurai	"Flowers" by Miley Cyrus	undisclosed	WIN
2	Popcorn	"Bonbons Caramels" by Annie Cordy	Chantal Goya	OUT
3	Hippo	"Voilà" by Barbara Pravi	undisclosed	WIN

==== Week 2 (10 May) ====
Performances on the first half
#	Stage name	Song		
1	Pickle	"Et c'est parti..." by Nâdiya		
2	Dragonfly	"Womanizer" by Britney Spears		
3	Hand	"Le monde est stone" by Fabienne Thibeault		
Sing-off details			Identity	Result
1	Dragonfly	"Clic clic pan pan" by Yanns	undisclosed	WIN
2	Hand	"Quand je vois tes yeux" by Dany Brillant	undisclosed	WIN
3	Pickle	"La quête" by Orelsan	Vincent Desagnat	OUT

Performances on the second half
#	Stage name	Song		
1	Scarecrow	"The Loneliest" by Måneskin		
2	Robobunny	"Ça m'énerve" by Helmut Fritz		
3	Lemur	"Alors on danse" by Stromae		
Sing-off details			Identity	Result
1	Scarecrow	"Qui a le droit" by Patrick Bruel	undisclosed	WIN
2	Robobunny	"Un lapin" by Chantal Goya	undisclosed	WIN
3	Lemur	"La mamma" by Charles Aznavour	Catherine Lara	OUT

==== Week 3 (17 May) ====
- Theme: Movies
- Guest Performance: "Stand By Me" by Ben E. King (Stand by Me) performed by Gloria Gaynor as "Ice Queen"

Performances on the third episode
#	Stage name	Song	Identity	Result
1	Leopard	"L'histoire de la vie" by Debbie Davis (The Lion King)	undisclosed	WIN
2	Hand	"Hot Stuff" by Donna Summer (The Full Monty)	La Compagnie Créole	OUT
3	Scarecrow	"Rocketman" by Elton John (Rocketman)	undisclosed	RISK
4	Dragonfly	"Dance the Night" by Dua Lipa (Barbie)	undisclosed	WIN
5	Hippo	"Oh, Pretty Woman" by Roy Orbison (Pretty Woman)	undisclosed	RISK
6	Geishamurai	"Hallelujah" by Leonard Cohen (Shrek and Sing)	undisclosed	WIN
7	Robobunny	"Just Because of You" by Jean-Denis Perez (French Fried Vacation 2)	undisclosed	RISK
8	Pearl	"I'll Never Love Again" by Lady Gaga (A Star Is Born)	undisclosed	WIN

==== Week 4 (24 May) ====
Performances on the fourth episode
#	Stage name	Song	Identity	Result
1	Pearl	"Petite sœur" by Ben l'oncle Soul	undisclosed	WIN
2	Leopard	"So What" by Pink	undisclosed	WIN
3	Robobunny	"Les marionettes" by Christophe	Raphaël Mezrahi	OUT
Wildcard	Wig	"Unstoppable" by Sia	undisclosed	RISK
4	Geishamurai	"Goodbye Marylou" by Polnareff	undisclosed	RISK
5	Scarecrow	"Shivers" by Ed Sheeran	undisclosed	WIN
6	Hippo	"Je l'aime à mourir" by Shakira	undisclosed	WIN
7	Dragonfly	"Secret" by Louane	undisclosed	RISK
Wildcard	Wig	"Andalouse" by Kendji Girac	Ladybug (Anouck Hautbois)	OUT

==== Week 5 (31 May) ====
- Guest Performance: "S'il suffisait d'aimer" by Celine Dion performed by Shy'm as "Flake"
- Theme: Love

Performances on the fifth episode
#	Stage name	Song	Result	
1	Hippo	"Flamme" by Juliette Armanet	WIN	
1	Pearl	"Flamme" by Juliette Armanet	WIN	
2	Dragonfly	"We Found Love" by Rihanna	RISK	
2	Geishamurai	"We Found Love" by Rihanna	RISK	
3	Scarecrow	"Donne-moi le temps" by Jenifer	WIN	
3	Leopard	"Donne-moi le temps" by Jenifer	WIN	
Sing-Off Details			Identity	Results
1	Dragonfly	"Popcorn salé" by Santa	Inès Vandamme	OUT
2	Geishamurai	"Je te promets" by Zaho	undisclosed	WIN

==== Week 6 (7 June) ====
- Guest Performance: "Houdini" by Dua Lipa performed by Natalie Imbruglia as "Joker"
- Theme: Idols

Performances on the sixth episode
#	Stage name	Song	Identity	Result
1	Geishamurai	"Remember the Time" by Michael Jackson	Florent Mothe	OUT
2	Pearl	"Je m'appelle Bagdad" by Tina Arena	undisclosed	WIN
3	Scarecrow	"L'Empire du côté obscur" by IAM	undisclosed	WIN
4	Hippo	"Shake It Off" by Taylor Swift	undisclosed	WIN
5	Leopard	"I Wish" by Stevie Wonder	undisclosed	RISK

==== Week 7 (15 June) ====
- Group Performance: "Le Bal masqué" by La Compagnie Créole
- Guest Performance: "Si j'étais un homme" by Diane Tell performed by Vincent Desagnat as "Avatar"
- Theme: 80s Night

Performances on the seventh episode
#	Stage name	Song	Identity	Result
1	Leopard	"Call Me" by Blondie	undisclosed	WIN
2	Pearl	"Ève lève-toi" by Julie Pietri	Sheryfa Luna	OUT
3	Hippo	"Conga" by Gloria Estefan & Miami Sound Machine	undisclosed	WIN
4	Scarecrow	"Je ne suis pas un héros" by Daniel Balavoine	undisclosed	RISK

==== Week 8 (22 June) ====
- Guest Group Performance: "Respire encore" by Clara Luciani performed by Vincent Niclo as Husky, Aurélie Konaté as Doe and Charlotte Gaccio as Jellyfish

===== Round One =====
Performances on the final episode – round one
#	Stage name	Song	Identity	Result
1	Scarecrow and Husky	"Il mio rifugio" by Riccardo Cocciante	undisclosed	SAFE
2	Hippo and Doe	"Single Ladies (Put A Ring On It)" by Beyoncé	undisclosed	SAFE
3	Leopard and Jellyfish	"Viens on s'aime" by Slimane	Chimène Badi	THIRD

===== Round Two =====
Performances on the final episode – round two
#	Stage name	Song	Identity	Result
1	Scarecrow	"La Chanson des vieux amants" by Jacques Brel	Gérémy Crédeville	RUNNER-UP
2	Hippo	"Des milliers de je t'aime" by Slimane	Agustín Galiana	WINNER

== Season 7 (2025) ==
=== Contestants ===
Stage Name	Identity	Occupation	Episodes										
Stage Name	Identity	Occupation	1	2	3	4		5	6		7	8	9
Stage Name	Identity	Occupation	A	B	A	B1	B2	5	A	B	7	8	9
Giraffe (Girafe)	Lola Dubini	Singer/actress	WIN		WIN			RISK		WIN	WIN	RISK	WINNER
Cow (Vache)	PEF	Actor/director		WIN			WIN	WIN	WIN		WIN	WIN	RUNNER-UP
Kitten (Chaton)	Séverine Ferrer	Singer/TV host	WIN		WIN			RISK	RISK		RISK	WIN	THIRD
Swan (Cygne)	Anne Sila	Singer/actress	WIN		RISK			WIN		WIN	WIN	OUT	
Buffalo (Bison)	Damien Sargue	Singer		WIN		WIN		WIN	WIN		OUT		
Broccoli (Brocoli)	LeBouseuh	YouTuber	RISK		WIN			RISK		OUT			
Porcelain (Porcelaine) (WC)	Michaël Gregorio	Imitator				RISK	RISK	WIN	OUT				
Red Panda (Panda Roux)	Romane Dicko	Judoka		WIN			WIN	OUT					
Strawberry (Fraisier)	Philippe Candeloro	Figure skater		RISK			OUT						
Queen of Hearts (Dame de Cœur)	Marie-Ange Nardi	TV host		RISK		OUT							
Ostrich (Autruche)	Jeanfi Janssens	Humorist	WIN		OUT								
Racing Car (Bolide)	Hélène Rollès	Actress/singer		OUT									
Rhino	Patrick Sébastien	TV presenter/singer	OUT										

The masked singer won its face-off and remained in the competition.
The masked singer lost its face-off, but was not eliminated.
The masked singer was eliminated from the competition and unmasked upon elimination.
The masked singer was saved from elimination.
The masked singer did not perform in this episode.

=== Episodes ===
==== Week 1 (2 May) ====
Performances on the first half
#	Stage name	Song		
1	Giraffe	"Girl on Fire" by Alicia Keys		
2	Rhino	"Encore et encore" by Francis Cabrel		
3	Swan	"Wake Me Up" by Avicii		
Sing-off details			Identity	Result
1	Giraffe	"Que tu reviennes" by Patrick Fiori	undisclosed	WIN
2	Swan	"Immortelle" by Lara Fabian	undisclosed	WIN
3	Rhino	"Tu vuo fa l'americano" by D'Caro Groove	Patrick Sébastien	OUT

Performances on the second half
#	Stage name	Song		
1	Ostrich	"La Goffa Lolita" by La Petite Culotte		
2	Kitten	"Parce que c'est toi" by Axelle Red		
3	Broccoli	"Le graal" by Kyo		
Sing-off details			Identity	Result
1	Kitten	"Le Reste" by Clara Luciani	undisclosed	WIN
2	Broccoli	"Bande organisée" by 13'Organisé	undisclosed	RISK
3	Ostrich	"Tomber la chemise" by Zebda	undisclosed	WIN

==== Week 2 (9 May) ====
- Guest Performance: "Could You Be Loved" by Bob Marley and the Wailers performed by Shaggy as "Cyclops"

Performances on the second episode
#	Stage name	Song	Result	
1	Buffalo	"Beautiful Things" by Benson Boone	WIN	
2	Racing Car	"Sur ma route" by Black M	RISK	
3	Cow	"Mundian To Bach Ke" by Panjabi MC	WIN	
4	Queen of Hearts	"Mon mec à moi" by Patricia Kaas	RISK	
5	Strawberry	"Stayin' Alive" by Bee Gees	RISK	
6	Red Panda	"Besoin d’amour" by France Gall	WIN	
Face-off details			Identity	Result
1	Racing Car	"La plus belle pour aller danser" by Sylvie Vartan	Hélène Rollès	OUT
2	Strawberry	"Le Banana Split" by Lio	undisclosed	SAFE
3	Queen of Hearts	"Les Moulins de mon cœur" by Michel Legrand	undisclosed	SAFE

==== Week 3 (16 May) ====
- Theme: Summer Hits
- Guest Performance: "Hung Up" by Madonna performed by La Toya Jackson as "Empress"

Performances on the third episode
#	Stage name	Song	Identity	Result
1	Swan	"Objection" by Shakira	undisclosed	RISK
2	Broccoli	"Femme Like U" by K.Maro	undisclosed	WIN
3	Kitten	"Mambo No. 5 (A Little Bit Of...)" by Lou Bega	undisclosed	WIN
4	Giraffe	"Être à la hauteur" by Emmanuel Moire	undisclosed	WIN
5	Ostrich	"99 Luftballons" by Nena	Jeanfi Janssens	OUT

==== Week 4 (23 May) ====
- Theme: Musicals

Performances on the fourth episode
#	Stage name	Song	Identity	Result
1	Buffalo	"The Greatest Show" by Hugh Jackman (The Greatest Showman)	undisclosed	WIN
2	Queen of Hearts	"Chanson populaire" by Fabian Richard & Lucas (Belles belles belles)	Marie-Ange Nardi	OUT
Wildcard	Porcelain	"Memory" by Barbra Streisand (Cats)	undisclosed	RISK
3	Red Panda	"L'amour brille sous les étoiles" by Emmanuel Curtil & Maïdi Roth (The Lion King)	undisclosed	WIN
4	Cow	"City of Stars" by Ryan Gosling and Emma Stone (La La Land)	undisclosed	WIN
5	Strawberry	"I Like to Move It" by Sacha Baron Cohen (Madagascar)	Philippe Candeloro	OUT
Wildcard	Porcelain	"I Dreamed a Dream" by Patti LuPone (Les Misérables)	undisclosed	RISK

==== Week 5 (30 May) ====
- Guest Performance: "Pour que tu m'aimes encore" by Celine Dion performed by Arnaud Ducret as "Burger"
- Theme: 90s Night

Performances on the fifth episode
#	Stage name	Song	Identity	Result
1	Giraffe	"Man! I Feel Like A Woman" by Shania Twain	undisclosed	RISK
2	Cow	"Déjeuner en paix" by Stephan Eicher	undisclosed	WIN
3	Swan	"Don't Speak" by No Doubt	undisclosed	WIN
4	Kitten	"If You Had My Love" by Jennifer Lopez	undisclosed	RISK
5	Buffalo	"La Tribu de Dana" by Manau	undisclosed	WIN
6	Red Panda	"Wannabe" by Spice Girls	Romane Dicko	OUT
7	Porcelain	"Lovefool" by The Cardigans	undisclosed	WIN
8	Broccoli	"Le Jerk !" by Thierry Hazard	undisclosed	RISK

==== Week 6 (6 June) ====
- Guest panelist: Cristina Córdula
- Theme: Harry Potter Night

Performances on the sixth episode
#	Stage name	Song	Identity	Result
1	Kitten	"Elle me contrôle" by M.Pokora	undisclosed	RISK
2	Buffalo	"Sign of the Times" by Harry Styles	undisclosed	WIN
3	Cow	"Je dois m'en aller" by Niagara	undisclosed	WIN
4	Porcelain	"Over the Rainbow" by Judy Garland	Michaël Gregorio	OUT
5	Giraffe	"Si je m'en sors" by Julie Zenatti	undisclosed	WIN
6	Broccoli	"Magic in the Air" by Magic System feat. Chawki	LeBouseuh	OUT
7	Swan	"Love the Way You Lie" by Eminem feat. Rihanna	undisclosed	WIN

==== Week 7 (13 June) ====
- Theme: Karaoke
- Guest Performance: "La vie par procuration" by Jean-Jacques Goldman performed by Jarry as "Pilot"

Performances on the seventh episode
#	Stage name	Song	Result	
1	Giraffe	"Jeune Demoiselle" by Diam's	WIN	
2	Kitten	"APT." by Rosé feat. Bruno Mars	RISK	
3	Buffalo	"Can't Stop the Feeling!" by Justin Timberlake	RISK	
4	Swan	"Un point c'est toi" by Zazie	WIN	
5	Cow	"L'Italiano" by Toto Cutugno	WIN	
Face-off details			Identity	Result
1	Kitten	"Give It Away" by Red Hot Chili Peppers	undisclosed	SAFE
2	Buffalo	"Eva" by Kendji Girac	Damien Sargue	OUT

==== Week 8 (20 June) ====
- Theme: Las Vegas
- Guest Performance: "You Can Leave Your Hat On" by Joe Cocker performed by Patrick Duffy as "Frog"

Performances on the eighth episode
#	Stage name	Song	Result	
1	Cow	"Kiss" by Prince	WIN	
2	Giraffe	"Alive" by Sia	RISK	
3	Kitten	"Glory Box" by Portishead	WIN	
4	Swan	"Kissing You" by Des'ree	RISK	
Face-off details			Identity	Result
1	Giraffe	"Question de survie" by L5	undisclosed	SAFE
2	Swan	"La nuit je mens" by Alain Bashung	Anne Sila	OUT

==== Week 9 (27 June) ====
- Guest Group Performance: "Tu me Play" by Juliette Armanet performed by Denitsa Ikonomova as Butterfly, Gérémy Crédeville as Scarecrow and Chimène Badi as Leopard

===== Round One =====
Performances on the final episode – round one
#	Stage name	Song	Identity	Result
1	Giraffe and Leopard	"Où je vais" by Amel Bent	undisclosed	SAFE
2	Cow and Scarecrow	"Antisocial" by Trust	undisclosed	SAFE
3	Kitten and Butterfly	"Ceux qu'on était" by Pierre Garnier	Séverine Ferrer	THIRD

===== Round Two =====
Performances on the final episode – round two
#	Stage name	Song	Identity	Result
1	Giraffe	"Set Fire to the Rain" by Adele	Lola Dubini	WINNER
2	Cow	"Imagine" by John Lennon	PEF	RUNNER-UP

== Season 8 (2025) ==
=== Contestants ===
Stage Name	Identity	Occupation	Episodes							
Stage Name	Identity	Occupation	1		2	3	4	5	6	7
Stage Name	Identity	Occupation	A	B	2	3	4	5	6	7
Rabbit (Lapin)	Ycare	Singer	WIN		WIN	WIN	WIN	WIN	WIN	WINNER
Mole (Taupe)	Priscilla Betti	Singer/actress		WIN	RISK	WIN	RISK	RISK	WIN	RUNNER-UP
Lamb (Agneau)	Karima Charni	TV presenter	WIN		WIN	WIN	WIN	WIN	RISK	THIRD
Beetle (Scarabée)	Élisa Tovati	Singer	WIN		WIN	WIN	WIN	WIN	OUT	
DJ	Tibo InShape	YouTuber		WIN	RISK	RISK	RISK	OUT		
Cuddly Toy (Doudou)	Francis Perrin	Actor	RISK		WIN	RISK	OUT			
Beaver (Castor)	Patrick Bosso	Actor		RISK	RISK	OUT				
Gladiator (Gladiateur)	Boris Diaw	Basketballer	RISK		OUT					
Lynx	Natacha Amal	Actress		OUT						
Plankton (Plancton)	Vincent Moscato	Rugby player	OUT							

=== Episodes ===
==== Week 1 (12 September) ====
- Theme: French Songs

Performances of the first half
#	Stage name	Song	Identity	Result
1	Rabbit	"Je ne suis pas un héros" by Daniel Balavoine	undisclosed	WIN
2	Cuddly Toy	"Tata Yoyo" by Annie Cordy	undisclosed	RISK
3	Gladiator	"La Corrida" by Francis Cabrel	undisclosed	RISK
4	Lamb	"Ma révolution" by Jenifer	undisclosed	WIN
5	Plankton	"Pas de boogie woogie" by Eddy Mitchell	Vincent Moscato	OUT
6	Beetle	"La Symphonie des éclairs" by Zaho de Sagazan	undisclosed	WIN

Performances of the second half
#	Stage name	Song	Identity	Result
1	Mole	"Recommence-moi" by Santa	undisclosed	WIN
2	Beaver	"Si, maman si" by France Gall	undisclosed	RISK
3	Lynx	"Les filles, les meufs" by Marguerite	Natacha Amal	OUT
4	DJ	"Fous ta cagoule" by Fatal Bazooka	undisclosed	WIN

==== Week 2 (19 September) ====
- Theme: Hollywood
- Guest Performance: "Men in Black" by Will Smith (Men in Black) performed by Brian Austin Green as "Goat"

Performances on the second episode
#	Stage name	Song	Identity	Result
1	Lamb	"Lady Marmalade" by Christina Aguilera, Lil' Kim, Mýa, Pink and Missy Elliott (Moulin Rouge!)	undisclosed	WIN
2	DJ	"Prince Ali" by Anthony Kavanagh (Aladdin)	undisclosed	RISK
3	Rabbit	"My Heart Will Go On" by Celine Dion (Titanic)	undisclosed	WIN
4	Beaver	"La Carioca" by Alain Chabat & Gérard Darmon (La Cité de la peur)	undisclosed	RISK
5	Mole	"I Don't Want to Miss a Thing" by Aerosmith (Armageddon)	undisclosed	RISK
6	Cuddly Toy	"Il en faut peu pour être heureux" by Jean Stout & Pascal Bressy (The Jungle Book)	undisclosed	WIN
7	Gladiator	"Eye of the Tiger" by Survivor (Rocky III)	Boris Diaw	OUT
8	Beetle	"La Seine" by Vanessa Paradis & -M- (A Monster in Paris)	undisclosed	WIN

==== Week 3 (26 September) ====
- Theme: Police Songs
- Guest Performance: "Purple Rain" by Prince performed by Lou Bega as "Bird"

Performances on the third episode
#	Stage name	Song	Identity	Result
1	Rabbit	"Requiem pour un fou" by Johnny Hallyday	undisclosed	WIN
2	Cuddly Toy	"Jailhouse Rock" by Elvis Presley	undisclosed	RISK
3	Beetle	"Bravo tu as gagné" by Mireille Mathieu	undisclosed	WIN
4	Beaver	"Toi + Moi" by Grégoire	Patrick Bosso	OUT
5	Lamb	"Quelques mots d'amour" by Michel Berger	undisclosed	WIN
6	DJ	"Hey Oh" by Tragédie	undisclosed	RISK
7	Mole	"What's Up?" by 4 Non Blondes	undisclosed	WIN

==== Week 4 (3 October) ====
- Theme: Party
- Guest Performance: "Crazy" by Gnarls Barkley performed by Constance Gay as "Lady Sausage"

Performances on the fourth episode
#	Stage name	Song	Identity	Result
1	Lamb	"Gimme! Gimme! Gimme! (A Man After Midnight)" by ABBA	undisclosed	WIN
2	Mole	"Le Dernier Jour du disco" by Juliette Armanet	undisclosed	RISK
3	DJ	"Ces soirées-là" by Yannick	undisclosed	RISK
4	Beetle	"Photograph" by Ed Sheeran	undisclosed	WIN
5	Cuddly Toy	"Le Lundi au soleil" by Claude François	Francis Perrin	OUT
6	Rabbit	"When the Rain Begins to Fall" by Jermaine Jackson and Pia Zadora	undisclosed	WIN

==== Week 5 (11 October) ====
- Theme: Halloween
- Guest Performance: "Marcia Baïla" by Les Rita Mitsouko performed by Marie s'infiltre as "Martian"

Performances on the fifth episode
#	Stage name	Song	Identity	Result
1	Beetle	"Abracadabra" by Lady Gaga	undisclosed	WIN
2	Mole	"Creep" by Radiohead	undisclosed	RISK
3	Lamb	"Disturbia" by Rihanna	undisclosed	WIN
4	DJ	"Les Démons de minuit" by Images	Tibo InShape	OUT
5	Rabbit	"The Sound of Silence" by Simon & Garfunkel	undisclosed	WIN

==== Week 6 (17 October) ====
- Theme: Time Travel
- Guest Performance: "You're the First, the Last, My Everything" by Barry White performed by Jean-Luc Reichmann as "Lord of the Forest"

Performances on the sixth episode
#	Stage name	Song	Identity	Result
1	Lamb	"Dernière danse" by Indila	undisclosed	RISK
2	Mole	"Heavy Cross" by Gossip	undisclosed	WIN
3	Beetle	"Amoureuse" by Véronique Sanson	Élisa Tovati	OUT
4	Rabbit	"Losing My Religion" by R.E.M.	undisclosed	WIN

==== Week 7 (24 October) ====
- Guest Group Performance: "Spider" by Gims & Dystinct performed by LeBouseuh as Broccoli, Anne Sila as Swan and Séverine Ferrer as Kitten

===== Round One =====
Performances on the final episode – round one
#	Stage name	Song	Identity	Result
1	Mole and Swan	"Halo" by Beyoncé	undisclosed	SAFE
2	Rabbit and Broccoli	"J'ai demandé à la lune" by Indochine	undisclosed	SAFE
3	Lamb and Kitten	"Superstar" by Jamelia	Karima Charni	THIRD

===== Round Two =====
Performances on the final episode – round two
#	Stage name	Song	Identity	Result
1	Mole	"En apesanteur" by Calogero	Priscilla Betti	RUNNER-UP
2	Rabbit	"Viva la Vida" by Coldplay	Ycare	WINNER

== Season 9 (2026) ==
=== Contestants ===
Stage Name	Identity	Occupation	Episodes										
Stage Name	Identity	Occupation	1	2	3	4	5	6		7	8		9
Stage Name	Identity	Occupation	A	B	C	4	5	A	B	7	A	B	9
Donkey (Âne)	Billy Crawford	Singer		WIN		WIN		WIN		WIN		WIN	WINNER
Chick (Poussin)	Carla Lazzari	Singer	WIN			WIN		WIN		WIN		WIN	RUNNER-UP
Bouquet	Anisha Jo	Singer		RISK			RISK		WIN	RISK	WIN		THIRD
Owl (Chouette)	Plastic Bertrand	Singer	WIN			WIN			RISK	RISK		OUT	
Venetian (Vénitienne)	Sarah Schwab	Singer/imitator			WIN	RISK			WIN	WIN	OUT		
Clown	Laurent Gamelon	Actor		WIN			WIN	RISK		OUT			
Wild Boar (Sanglier)	Bruce Toussaint	Journalist/TV host			RISK		WIN		OUT				
Pebble (Caillou)	Dany Brillant	Singer			WIN		WIN	OUT					
Cyborg	Pascal Légitimus	Actor/comedian	RISK				OUT						
Russian Dolls (Poupées Russes)	Worlds Apart	Boys band	WIN			OUT							
Mummy (Momie)	Michael Jones	Singer			OUT								
Panther (Panthère)	Véronique Jannot	Actress/singer		OUT									
Avocado (Avocat)	Firmine Richard	Actress	OUT										

The masked singer won its face-off and remained in the competition.
The masked singer lost its face-off, but was not eliminated.
The masked singer was eliminated from the competition and unmasked upon elimination.
The masked singer was saved from elimination.
The masked singer did not perform in this episode.

=== Episodes ===
==== Week 1 (24 April) ====
Performances on the first episode
#	Stage name	Song	Result	
1	Owl	"Le Paradis blanc" by Michel Berger	WIN	
2	Avocado	"Mexico" by Luis Mariano	RISK	
3	Russian Dolls	"All by Myself" by Eric Carmen	WIN	
4	Chick	"Golden" by Huntrix	WIN	
5	Cyborg	"Elle me dit" by MIKA	RISK	
Face-off details			Identity	Result
1	Cyborg	"Mistral gagnant" by Renaud	undisclosed	SAFE
2	Avocado	"Mistral gagnant" by Renaud	Firmine Richard	OUT

==== Week 2 (1 May) ====
- Guest Panelist: Booder
- Guest Performance: "My Love" by Justin Timberlake performed by Jason Derulo as "Hedgehog"

Performances on the second episode
#	Stage name	Song	Result	
1	Donkey	"Let's Get It Started" by Black Eyed Peas	WIN	
2	Bouquet	"Je t'aime" by Lara Fabian	RISK	
3	Clown	"Mourir sur scène" by Dalida	WIN	
4	Panther	"Harley Davidson" by Brigitte Bardot	RISK	
Face-off details			Identity	Result
1	Bouquet	"Sensualité" by Axelle Red	undisclosed	SAFE
2	Panther	"Sensualité" by Axelle Red	Véronique Jannot	OUT

==== Week 3 (8 May) ====
- Guest Performance: "Aimons-nous vivants" by François Valéry performed by Monsieur Poulpe as "Potato"

Performances on the third episode
#	Stage name	Song	Result	
1	Mummy	"Footloose" by Kenny Loggins	RISK	
2	Venetian	"Maman" by Louane	WIN	
3	Wild Boar	"Place des grands hommes" by Patrick Bruel	RISK	
4	Pebble	"Can't Help Falling in Love" by Elvis Presley	WIN	
Face-off details			Identity	Result
1	Mummy	"Ma liberté de penser" by Florent Pagny	Michael Jones	OUT
2	Wild Boar	"Ma liberté de penser" by Florent Pagny	undisclosed	SAFE

==== Week 4 (22 May) ====
- Theme: World Tour
- Guest Performance: "Mauvaise foi nocturne" by Fatal Bazooka feat. Vitoo performed by LeBouseuh & Pidi as "Hammerhead" and "Walrus"

Performances on the fourth episode
#	Stage name	Song	Result	
1	Donkey	"Despacito" by Luis Fonsi feat. Daddy Yankee	WIN	
2	Venetian	"Partir là-bas" from The Little Mermaid	RISK	
3	Russian Dolls	"Don't Stop Me Now" by Queen	RISK	
4	Chick	"Je vis pour elle (Vivo per lei)" by Andrea Bocelli and Hélène Ségara	WIN	
5	Owl	"Baila morena" by Zucchero	WIN	
Face-off details			Identity	Result
1	Russian Dolls	"Un autre monde" by Téléphone	Worlds Apart	OUT
2	Venetian	"Un autre monde" by Téléphone	undisclosed	SAFE

==== Week 5 (29 May) ====
- Theme: Summer
- Guest Performance: "Popcorn salé" by Santa performed by Christophe Willem as "Werewolf"

Performances on the fifth episode
#	Stage name	Song	Result	
1	Pebble	"Je vais à Rio" by Claude François	WIN	
2	Bouquet	"Flowers" by Miley Cyrus	RISK	
3	Clown	"Partir un jour" by 2Be3	WIN	
4	Wild Boar	"Volare" by Gipsy Kings	WIN	
5	Cyborg	"Copacabana" by Line Renaud	RISK	
Face-off details			Identity	Result
1	Bouquet	"Les Sunlights des tropiques" by Gilbert Montagné	undisclosed	SAFE
2	Cyborg	"Les Sunlights des tropiques" by Gilbert Montagné	Pascal Légitimus	OUT

==== Week 6 (5 June) ====
- Theme: Party

Performances on the sixth episode
#	Stage name	Song	Identity	Result
1	Donkey	"Uptown Funk" by Mark Ronson feat. Bruno Mars	undisclosed	WIN
2	Clown	"Un homme heureux" by William Sheller	undisclosed	RISK
3	Chick	"Je serai (ta meilleure amie)" by Lorie / "Oops!... I Did It Again" by Britney Spears	undisclosed	WIN
4	Pebble	"La Java de Broadway" by Michel Sardou	Dany Brillant	OUT
5	Owl	"Mystical Magical" by Benson Boone	undisclosed	RISK
6	Bouquet	"Alexandrie Alexandra" by M. Pokora	undisclosed	WIN
7	Venetian	"I Will Always Love You" by Whitney Houston	undisclosed	WIN
8	Wild Boar	"Confidence pour confidence" by Jean Schultheis	Bruce Toussaint	OUT

==== Week 7 (12 June) ====
- Theme: Superheroes
- Guest Performance: "The Best" by Tina Turner performed by Michelle Williams as "Bat"

Performances on the seventh episode
#	Stage name	Song	Identity	Result
1	Venetian	"The Show Must Go On" by Queen	undisclosed	WIN
2	Clown	"La Foule" by Édith Piaf	Laurent Gamelon	OUT
3	Owl	"Double jeu" by Christophe Willem	undisclosed	RISK
4	Chick	"Quand on arrive en ville" / "Le monde est stone" from Starmania	undisclosed	WIN
5	Bouquet	"Only Girl (In the World)" by Rihanna	undisclosed	RISK
6	Donkey	"I Got You (I Feel Good)" by James Brown	undisclosed	WIN

==== Week 8 (19 June) ====
- Group Performance: "Désenchantée" by Mylène Farmer
- Panelist Performance: "Caruso" by Lucio Dalla performed by Michaël Youn as "Gorilla"

Performances on the eighth episode
#	Stage name	Song	Identity	Result
1	Venetian	"It's All Coming Back to Me Now" by Celine Dion	Sarah Schwab	OUT
2	Bouquet	"Believer" by Imagine Dragons	undisclosed	WIN
3	Owl	"Les Mots bleus" by Christophe	Plastic Bertrand	OUT
4	Chick	"Flashdance... What a Feeling" by Irene Cara	undisclosed	WIN
5	Donkey	"Le Portrait" by Calogero	undisclosed	WIN

==== Week 9 (27 June) ====
- Guest Group Performance: "Le sens de la vie" by Tal performed by Élisa Tovati as Beetle, Karima Charni as Lamb and Priscilla Betti as Mole

===== Round One =====
Performances on the final episode – round one
#	Stage name	Song	Identity	Result
1	Bouquet and Lamb	"Hymne à l'amour" by Édith Piaf	Anisha Jo	THIRD
2	Donkey and Beetle	"New York avec toi" by Téléphone	undisclosed	SAFE
3	Chick and Mole	"Mon amour" by Slimane	undisclosed	SAFE

===== Round Two =====
Performances on the final episode – round two
#	Stage name	Song	Identity	Result
1	Donkey	"Beat It" by Michael Jackson	Billy Crawford	WINNER
2	Chick	"Tous les cris les SOS" by Daniel Balavoine	Carla Lazzari	RUNNER-UP

== Christmas Special (2024) ==
On 20 December 2024, a Christmas special was aired with 10 previous costumes of the show. In these costumes, 9 of the 10 contestants were previous contestants who participated in the first 5 seasons but in other costumes.

Stage Name	Identity	Occupation	Round				
Stage Name	Identity	Occupation	1		2		3
Stage Name	Identity	Occupation	A	B	A	B	3
Chameleon (Caméléon)	Véronic DiCaire	Imitator/singer			WIN	WIN	WINNER
Dragon	Laurent Ournac	Comedian	WIN	WIN			RUNNER-UP
Husky	Natasha St-Pier	Singer			WIN	OUT	
Monkey (Singe)	Larusso	Singer			WIN	OUT	
Peacock (Paon)	Keen'V	Singer			OUT		
Camel (Chameau)	Cartman & Issa Doumbia	Comedians			OUT		
Lion	Djibril Cissé	Footballer			OUT		
Skeleton (Squelette)	Marc-Antoine Le Bret	Imitator	WIN	OUT			
Spider (Araignée)	Valérie Bègue	TV personality/Miss France 2008	OUT				
Bride (Mariée)	Laurence Boccolini	TV presenter	OUT				

Part 1
#	Stage name	Song	Identity	Result
1	Bride	"Santa Tell Me" by Ariana Grande	Laurence Boccolini	OUT
2	Dragon	"A Sky Full Of Stars" by Coldplay	undisclosed	WIN
3	Skeleton	"Il jouait du piano debout" by France Gall	undisclosed	WIN
4	Spider	"Santa Baby" by Eartha Kitt	Valérie Bègue	OUT
#	Stage name	Song	Identity	Result
1	Dragon	"Prière païenne" by Celine Dion	undisclosed	WIN
2	Skeleton	"Prière païenne" by Celine Dion	Marc-Antoine Le Bret	OUT

Part 2
#	Stage name	Song	Identity	Result
5	Chameleon	"All I Want For Christmas Is You" by Mariah Carey	undisclosed	WIN
6	Lion	"Ensemble" by Sinclair	Djibril Cissé	OUT
7	Monkey	"Écris l'histoire" by Grégory Lemarchal	undisclosed	WIN
8	Camel	"Feliz Navidad" by José Feliciano	Cartman & Issa Doumbia	OUT
9	Peacock	"Les Poèmes de Michelle" by Teri Moïse	Keen'V	OUT
10	Husky	"Last Christmas" by Wham!	undisclosed	WIN
#	Stage name	Song	Identity	Result
3	Chameleon	"I Wanna Dance With Somebody" by Whitney Houston	undisclosed	WIN
4	Monkey	"I Wanna Dance With Somebody" by Whitney Houston	Larusso	OUT
5	Husky	"I Wanna Dance With Somebody" by Whitney Houston	Natasha St-Pier	OUT

Part 3
#	Stage name	Song	Identity	Result
1	Dragon	"Hold My Hand" by Lady Gaga	Laurent Ournac	RUNNER-UP
2	Chameleon	"Tous les mêmes" by Stromae	Véronic DiCaire	WINNER
