= Peppermoon =

French pop band

Peppermoon is a Parisian pop band, formed in spring 2006 by Pierre Faa (songwriter, keyboards) and Iris Koshlev (vocals). Faa and Koshlev met at French singer Buzy's concert in Paris on 15 December 2005, at La Boule Noire. Their first guitarist was Benoît Pillon (2006–2010), later replaced by Maxime Leclerc (2010–present). One of their early demos, "Les petits miroirs", was released on a Dutch compilation Filles Fragiles, in November 2007, and they appeared on Dutch television on 14 December 2007. Their songs were used in two short movies (Laundromat by Edward Gunawan, and Où est la sortie? by Jessey Tsang).

== Nos Ballades ==
After a few failed attempts to find a producer or a label for the album, Faa tried to do it all by himself in his Parisian home-studio, and their first album Nos Ballades was released in spring 2009. It had immediate interest in Asia, where the CD was on sale before the French release. Nos Ballades was released in Taiwan (July 2009), Japan (November 2009), Korea (December 2009) and China (January 2010). In early 2010, Peppermoon toured in these countries, playing in Taipei, Shanghai, Beijing, Tokyo, and Kyoto. The album sold well in Taiwan, where it climbed to #3 in the international pop charts. In France, the album received some good reviews, but sold poorly, being completely out of the French mainstream taste.

== Les Moissons d'ambre ==
Their second album, Les moissons d'ambre, (Amber Harvests) was released in Taiwan in November 2010, then in France (January 2011), Korea (March 2011), and China (October 2011). It contains a collaboration ("Le Refuge") with the Japanese composer-producer Toshiya Fueoka, from Mondialito. In Taiwan, the album was released as a 2-CD set with an exclusive covers EP that includes "Qui a tué grand-maman?" (Polnareff), "Manchester et Liverpool" (Marie Laforêt), "Tous les garçons et les filles", "Ce petit cœur" et "Comment te dire adieu" (Françoise Hardy), "La plus belle pour aller danser" (Sylvie Vartan), and "Porque te vas" (Jeanette).

== L'avenir n'est plus comme avant ==
Faa released a solo album, L'avenir n'est plus comme avant, in March 2011, produced by Jay Alansky (aka A Reminiscent Drive).
