= Un autre univers =

Studio album by Tina Arena
- Released: 5 December 2005
- Recorded: 2005
- Genre: Pop
- Length: 48:55
- Language: French
- Label: Columbia
- Producer: Duck Blackwell; Greg Fitzgerald; David Gategno; Robert Goldman; Paul Guardiani

Tina Arena chronology
Greatest Hits Live (2005)	Un autre univers (2005)	Songs of Love & Loss (2007)

Singles from Un autre univers
- 1. "Aimer jusqu'à l'impossible" Released: 14 November 2005; 2. "Je m'appelle Bagdad" Released: 22 May 2006; 3. "Tu aurais dû me dire (Oser parler d'amour)" Released: 30 October 2006

Un autre univers is the sixth studio album, and first entirely French language release, by Australian singer Tina Arena, released on 6 December 2005. It reached number 9 on the French chart in November 2006, its highest position since entering the chart almost a year earlier. The album was certified platinum in France.

The album blends acoustic guitars, eastern strings and driving rhythms. The 13-track album includes a duet with the French singer Henri Salvador, "Et puis après". Although never released as a single, the song was included on two subsequent records: the French compilation The Best & le meilleur and the concept record Songs of Love & Loss. The track was one of the veteran French singer's final recordings, becoming a standout cut from the album due to the high profile of the collaboration.

The title track is a French language re-working of "Woman" from previous studio album, Just Me. The title translates into English as "another universe".

Lead single "Aimer jusqu'à l'impossible" was her biggest French hit to date after debuting at number 3 on the French national chart in November 2005 and remaining in the top 5 for over 10 weeks. In February 2006 the single achieved platinum sales in France. A second single, "Je m'appelle Bagdad", was released in May and a third, "Tu aurais dû me dire (Oser parler d'amour)", in October 2006.

== Chart performance ==
The album peaked at number 9 on the French Albums Chart for one week, staying in the top 100 for sixty-two weeks and spending a total of seventy-eight weeks in the top 200. The album became the 127th highest selling album in France for 2005 and the 38th for 2006.

In Belgium, it entered the Belgian (Wallonia) Albums Chart at number 70 on 17 December 2005, then successfully moved to its peak position of #24 on 29 July 2006, the album spent a total of fifty-three weeks in the top 100.

In Switzerland, the album debuted at number 83 and peaked at 69, spending eight weeks in the top 100.

== Track listing ==
#	Title	Length	Composer(s)	Lyricist(s)	Producer(s)
1	"Aimer jusqu'à l'impossible"	3:21	David Maruani	Elodie Hesme	Gategno
2	"Tu aurais dû me dire (Oser parler d'amour)"	3:21	J. Kapler	Mathias Goudeau, J. Kapler	J. Kapler
3	"Je m'appelle Bagdad"	4:17	David Maruani	Elodie Hesme	Gategno
4	"Si tu veux mon coeur"	5:09	Filippina Arena, Irène Bo, Gregory Fitzgerald, Thomas Nichols		Fitzgerald
5	"J'ai envie de savoir"	4:28	Filippina Arena, Irène Bo, Duck Blackwell, Paul Guardiani		Blackwell, Guardiani
6	"S'il faut prier"	3:34	J. Kapler		
7	"Il y a des jours"	3:33	David Maruani	Olivier Béranger	Gategno
8	"Un autre univers"	3:51	Filippina Arena, Vincent Hare, Trina Harmon, Tyler Hayes	Vincent Hare	Blackwell, Guardiani
9	"Et puis après"	2:42	Henri Salvador	Lydia Martinico	Bernard Arcadio
10	"Changer"	2:56	Jacques Veneruso		
11	"Si j'avais le temps"	4:10	Filippina Arena	Patrick Fiori, Vincent Hare	Blackwell, Guardiani
12	"Jamais non jamais"	4:23	Filippina Arena, Franck Fossey	Franck Fossey	Blackwell, Guardiani
13	"Simple désir"	2:50	Filipinna Arena, Irène Bo, Lucy Harrison		Blackwell, Guardiani

== Charts ==
=== Weekly charts ===
Chart (2006)	Peak position
Belgian (Wallonia) Albums Chart	24
European Top 100 Albums	77
French Albums Chart	9
Swiss Albums Chart	69

=== Year-end charts ===
Chart (2005)	Position
French Albums Chart	127
Chart (2006)	Position
Belgian (Wallonia) Albums Chart	47
French Albums Chart	38

== Certifications ==
Region	Certification	Certified units/sales
France (SNEP)	Platinum	300,000^{*}
^{*} Sales figures based on certification alone.

== Release history ==
Region	Date	Label	Catalogue
Belgium	5 December 2005	Columbia Records	82876 73740 2
France	5 December 2005	Columbia Records	82876 73740 2
Switzerland	5 December 2005	Columbia Records	82876 73740 2
