= Tu aurais dû me dire (Oser parler d'amour) =

Single by Tina Arena

from the album Un autre univers
- Released: 30 October 2006
- Recorded: 2005
- Genre: Pop
- Length: 3:23
- Label: Columbia
- Songwriters: J. Kapler, Mathias Goudeau
- Producer: J. Kapler

Tina Arena singles chronology
"Je m'appelle Bagdad" (2006)	"Tu aurais dû me dire (Oser parler d'amour)" (2006)	"Entends-tu le monde?" (2007)

"Tu aurais dû me dire (Oser parler d'amour)" or "You Should Have Told Me (Dare to Speak of Love)" (in English) is the third single to be released from Tina Arena's fifth studio album Un autre univers. The single's popularity spurred the album up to its highest place in the French charts (No. 9) in November 2006 after its first appearance a year earlier.

== Track listing ==
1. "Tu aurais dû me dire (Oser parler d'amour)" (J. Kapler, Mathias Goudeau) – 3:23
2. "Un autre univers" (Tina Arena, Trina Harmon, Tyler Hayes, Vincent Hare) – 3:52

== Music video ==
The video for the song was based around a short film by French director Fabien Dufils in which was followed the entire life of a couple as shown entirely from a park bench. Arena approached Dufils about recreating the short for her music video and he obliged. "We went back to the original location for the re-shoot. All of my parts were carefully edited and adjusted in to match the original scenes. I had twelve costume changes and Lord knows how many blow dries. It was a hairdresser's nightmare. By the end of the day we were running out of time. I could see the sun was setting and we still had two scenes to film. In fact the last shots (in the rain) were done with barely any daylight left. You can imagine everyone's relief once we were finally done."

== Charts ==
Chart (2006)	Peak position
Belgian (Wallonia) Singles Chart	36
French Singles Chart	37
