= Laurence Boccolini =

French radio and television host

- Born: 8 May 1963 (age 62); Versailles, France
- Occupations: TV host, radio
- Employer: TF1
- Spouse: Mickaël Fakaïlo (m. 2003)
- Children: 1

Laurence Boccolini (born 8 May 1963) is a French radio and television host.

== Career ==
=== Radio ===
Her career began in the early 1980s on the RTY radio. In 1987, she joined Europe 1 where she hosted many programs, including Lenoir, Les Inconnus de l'après-midi, La vie en rock and Top 50 during the season 1987/1988. In 1992, she hosted on Fun Radio the morning program, replacing Arthur and Manu Levy. For three months, she hosted Lolo fait son show, before being replaced by Difool. She participated in the show Rien à cirer hosted by Laurent Ruquier on France Inter radio hosting her own show Rien à voir in 1999 and 2000. She also occasionally participated in RTL Les Grosses Têtes between 2000 and 2008 and then joined the team of On va s'gêner in 2009. Between August 2010 and June 2011, she helped candidates with Pierre Lescure on the game Le Carré magique presented by Nagui on Europe 1 from 9:30 am to 11 am.

=== Television ===
During the 1990s, Boccolini began to host on television. In 1994, she joined Tina Kieffer on the show Il fera beau demain on TF1, then hosted the game Pyramide for three months. In 1996, she replaced Nagui as host of the game Que le meilleur gagne on France 2.

In July 2001, TF1 gave her the role of hosting the game Le Maillon Faible., which ensured her national recognition. Then she hosted several prime time event including reality show Première compagnie in February 2005, the election of Mister France in 2003, La plus belle femme du monde and Le plus bel homme du monde alongside Christophe Dechavanne in 2004. Between 2003 and 2008, she was the main character, the writer and the singer of the ending credits of a recurring series on TF1 called Mademoiselle Joubert. In July 2007, she left TF1 and joined TMC. Then she presented Qui Veut Devenir Un Super Héros on Syfy. She returned to TF1 on 8 September 2008 to host Dance Floor : Qui sera le plus fort ?, a dance contest show which was broadcast for only two weeks. She co-hosted a subsequent prime-time program with Jean-Pierre Foucault, Français : la grande interro. Since 1 August 2011, she hosted the game Money Drop, adapted from the English game The Million Pound Drop, which achieved a success. In July 2012, she hosted Coucou c'est nous ! Les moments cultes.

On TMC, she hosted Le mur infernal until 2008, Fan des années 70, Fan des années 80, Fan des années 90 (since 2008), the reality show Moundir, l'aventurier de l'amour in February 2010 and Le Meilleur de l'humour. Between March and May 2011, she co-hosted, alongside Jean-Michel Zecca and Denis Maréchal Les inconnus de A à Z. On 2 November 2011, she presented the first edition of the magazine Zone paranormale.

She also won the first season of the Masked Singer France game show in 2019, dressed as a unicorn.

In 2021, she co-hosted with Stéphane Bern Eurovision France, c'est vous qui décidez !, the French selection for the Eurovision Song Contest 2021. She was also the French commentator during the two semi-finals of the contest and the co-commentator during the grand final alongside Bern. The pair were confirmed in their roles for 2022, 2023 and 2024.

=== Films ===
In 2003, she played a minor role in the film Ripoux 3, with Philippe Noiret. In 2007, she was proposed by director Alexandre Arcady to portray Nicole in his film Tu peux garder un secret ?, starring Pierre Arditi.

== Personal life ==
All four of Boccolini's grandparents were Italian: both of her parents were also born in Italy and later moved to France with their family.

On 31 July 2004, Boccolini married Mickaël Fakaïlo in Presles-en-Brie, whom she met in 2003 while hosting Mister France in which Fakaïlo was Mister Tahiti. She tried but failed to be pregnant, which she explained in her 2008 book Puisque les cigognes ont perdu mon adresse... On 25 November 2013, aged 50, she finally gave birth to a girl with Fakaïlo, named Willow, after five failed attempts at in vitro fertilization.

== Bibliography ==
- Je n'ai rien contre vous personnellement, Albin Michel, 1995 (ISBN 2226077405)
- Je n'ai rien contre vous personnellement..., et puis on ne peut pas plaire à tout le monde, 1999
- Méchante, Le Cherche-midi, coll. « Le Sens de humour », 2002 (ISBN 2749100461)
- Méchante no 2, Le Cherche midi, coll. « Le Sens de humour », 2005 (ISBN 2749104629)
- Puisque les cigognes ont perdu mon adresse, Plon, mars 2008 (ISBN 2259207782)
