= Issa Doumbia (actor) =

French actor and columnist

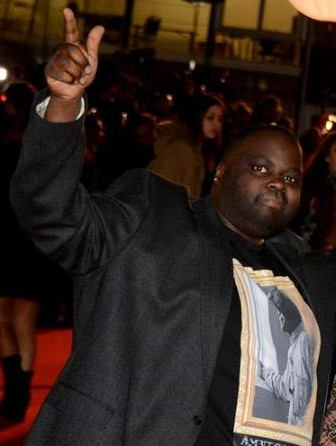
- Doumbia in 2013
- Born: 10 June 1982 (age 43); Versailles, France
- Occupation: Actor
- Years active: 2006–present

Issa Doumbia (born 10 June 1982) is a French actor and columnist.

== Filmography ==
Year	Title	Role	Director	Notes
2009	Brigade Navarro	Dauger	Gérard Marx & Philippe Davin	TV series (6 episodes)
2011	Beur sur la ville	Koulibali	Djamel Bensalah	
2011	Crédit pour tous	The mover	Jean-Pierre Mocky	
2011	Au bistro du coin	The delivery driver	Charles Nemes	
2012	The Chef	Moussa	Daniel Cohen	
2012–2014	Lascars	Barkette	Tristan Aurouet & Barthélémy Grossmann	TV series (24 episodes)
2012–2017	Nos chers voisins	Issa Leguenec	Emmanuel Rigaut, Gaëtan Bevernaege, ...	TV series (1700 episodes)
2013	Woody	Bernard	Amaro Shake	TV movie
2013	Roxane, la vie sexuelle de ma pote	The trainee	Benjamin Lehrer	TV series (2 episodes)
2014	Le crocodile du Botswanga	Soldier Issa	Lionel Steketee & Fabrice Eboué	
2017	La colle	Jean-Ed	Alexandre Castagnetti	
2017	Sales gosses	Touré	Frédéric Quiring	
2019	Sam	N'Dollo	Stéphanie Murat & Arnaud Sélignac	TV series (8 episodes)

== One-man Show ==
Year	Title	Author	Director	Notes
2014-2018	Première Consultation	Issa Doumbia & Kakumbé	Papy	

== Television ==
In 2015, he was columnist in the TV Show Touche pas à mon poste!.

== Personal life ==
Born in France, Doumbia is of Malian descent.
