= J'aime regarder les filles (song) =

"J'aime... regarder les filles"

Single by Patrick Coutin

from the album Coutin
- Language: French
- Released: 1981
- Genre: rock
- Label: Epic Records (CBS Disques)
- Songwriter: Patrick Coutin

Music video
- "J'aime... regarder les filles" (FR3, 1980) on YouTube

"J'aime... regarder les filles"' (or "J'aime regarder les filles", "I Love Looking at Girls") is a song by French singer and songwriter Patrick Coutin. It was released in 1981 as a single and on his debut album titled Coutin (or J'aime regarder les filles).

The song became emblematic of the 1980s in France.

== Writing and composition ==
The song was written by Patrick Coutin.

== Track listings ==
7" single Epic EPC 9473 (1981)

A. "J'aime... regarder les filles" (5:01)
B. "Lady Mandrax" (2:50)

== Charts ==
Chart (1999)	Peak position
France (SNEP)	37
Belgium (Ultratip Bubbling Under Wallonia)	15
Chart (2013)	Peak position
Belgique (Back Catalogue Singles Wallonia)	15

== Cover versions ==
The song has been covered, among others, by Rachida Brakni (in 2009 under the title "J'aime regarder les mecs", meaning "I Love Looking at Guys"), Vitor Hublot (in 2012), and Liane Foly (in 2016).
