= Aimer jusqu'à l'impossible =

Single by Tina Arena

from the album Un autre univers
- Released: 14 November 2005
- Recorded: 2005
- Genre: Pop
- Length: 3:21
- Label: Columbia
- Songwriters: David Gategno, Elodie Hesme
- Producer: David Gategno

Tina Arena singles chronology
"Italian Love Song" (2004)	"Aimer jusqu'à l'impossible" (2005)	"Je m'appelle Bagdad" (2006)

"Aimer jusqu'à l'impossible" (2005) is the first single from Australian singer Tina Arena's fifth studio album and its title roughly translates as "Love until the impossible" in English. The single was Tina's biggest hit in France to date.

After debuting at number 3 on the French national chart, it remained in the top five for 12 weeks and was certified platinum in February 2006. As of August 2014, it was the 68th best-selling single of the 21st century in France, with 354,000 units sold.

The video for the song was shot in Paris at a variety of different locations including the Champs-Élysées. It was directed by Thierry Vergnes.

She performed this song at 2006 NRJ Music Awards with six other female Francophone singers—Anggun, Natasha St-Pier, Amel Bent, Nâdiya, Lââm and Leslie.

== Track listings ==
1. "Aimer jusqu'à l'impossible" (David Gategno, Elodie Hesme) – 3:24
2. "Aller plus haut" (version 500 choristes) (J. Kapler) – 3:56
3. "Simple désir" (Tina Arena, Lucy Harrison) – 2:51

== Charts ==
=== Weekly charts ===
Chart (2005/06)	Peak position
Belgian (Wallonia) Singles Chart	1
European Hot 100 Singles	11
French Singles Chart	3
French Digital Singles Chart	2
Swiss Singles Chart	16

=== Year-end charts ===
Chart (2005)	Position
French Singles Chart	28
Chart (2006)	Position
Belgian (Wallonia) Singles Chart	13
French Airplay Chart	99
French Singles Chart	19
French Digital Singles Chart	41
Swiss Singles Chart	94

=== Certifications ===
Region	Certification	Certified units/sales
Belgium (BRMA)	Gold	25,000^{*}
France (SNEP)	Platinum	300,000^{*}
^{*} Sales figures based on certification alone.
