= Patrick Coutin =

- Born: 21 March 1952 (age 74); Sfax, Tunisia
- Genres: Rock, pop rock
- Occupations: Writer; journalist; singer; record producer
- Instruments: vocals, guitar
- Years active: 1981–present
- Website: coutin.net

Patrick Coutin (born 21 March 1952 in Sfax, Tunisia) is a French writer, journalist, rock singer, and record producer.

He is most known for his 1981 hit "J'aime regarder les filles" ("I Like Looking at Girls"), which became emblematic of the 1980s in France.

== Biography ==
After studying philosophy and plastic arts, Patric Coutin worked as a journalist at a number of music magazines, notably Rock & Folk.

Patrick enjoyed success as a singer in 1981 with his single hit, "J'aime J'aime les Filles". He will continue to publish albums, but will also make clips and exhibit paintings, of pop art influence.

Patrick will notably work as a videographer and even as a producer for Dick Rivers, Christophe Jenac (the grandson of Guy Lux), Jean-Pierre Morgand (of the group "Les Avions"), Michel Delpech or "Les Wampas".

In 1993, Patrick Coutin released a live album recorded in Lille, including new songs. Then will come "Love each other" in 1995, "Industrial Blues" in 2001, "Le bleu" in 2010 or "Babylone Panic" in 2012.

He gained international recognition with his hit "J'aime regarder les filles". Since the beginning of his musical career, women have been a source of inspiration for his work and a main theme in his songs.

Indeed, most of his writings refer to the Woman.

During the third millennium, he became an important figure in the French city named Bobigny. Inventive, he will be at the origin of the show "Ginzburg" in honor of Serge Gainsbourg.

== Discography ==
Studio albums

- Coutin (1981)
- Un étranger dans la ville (1982)
- L'heure bleue (1983)
- Aimez-vous les uns les autres (1983)
- Industrial blues (2001)
- Bleu (2010)

Live albums

- Coutin live

Singles

- "J'aime regarder les filles" (1981)
- "Danse" (1982)
- 'Tellement belle...si belle" (1982)
- "Rends-moi mon coeur gamine" (1983)
- "Louise" (1983)
- "Le sable est chaud" (1985)
- "Tous des salauds" (1985 or 1986)
- "Lolita Gardenal" (1985 or 1986)
- "Aimez-vous les uns les autres" (early 1990s)
- "J'aime regarder les filles" (1999, re-release)

== Other works ==
=== Albums produced by Patrick Coutin ===
- Amoureux de vous by Dick Rivers (2001)

=== Musicals ===
- Ginzburg (2005)
