= Gilbert Montagné =

French singer

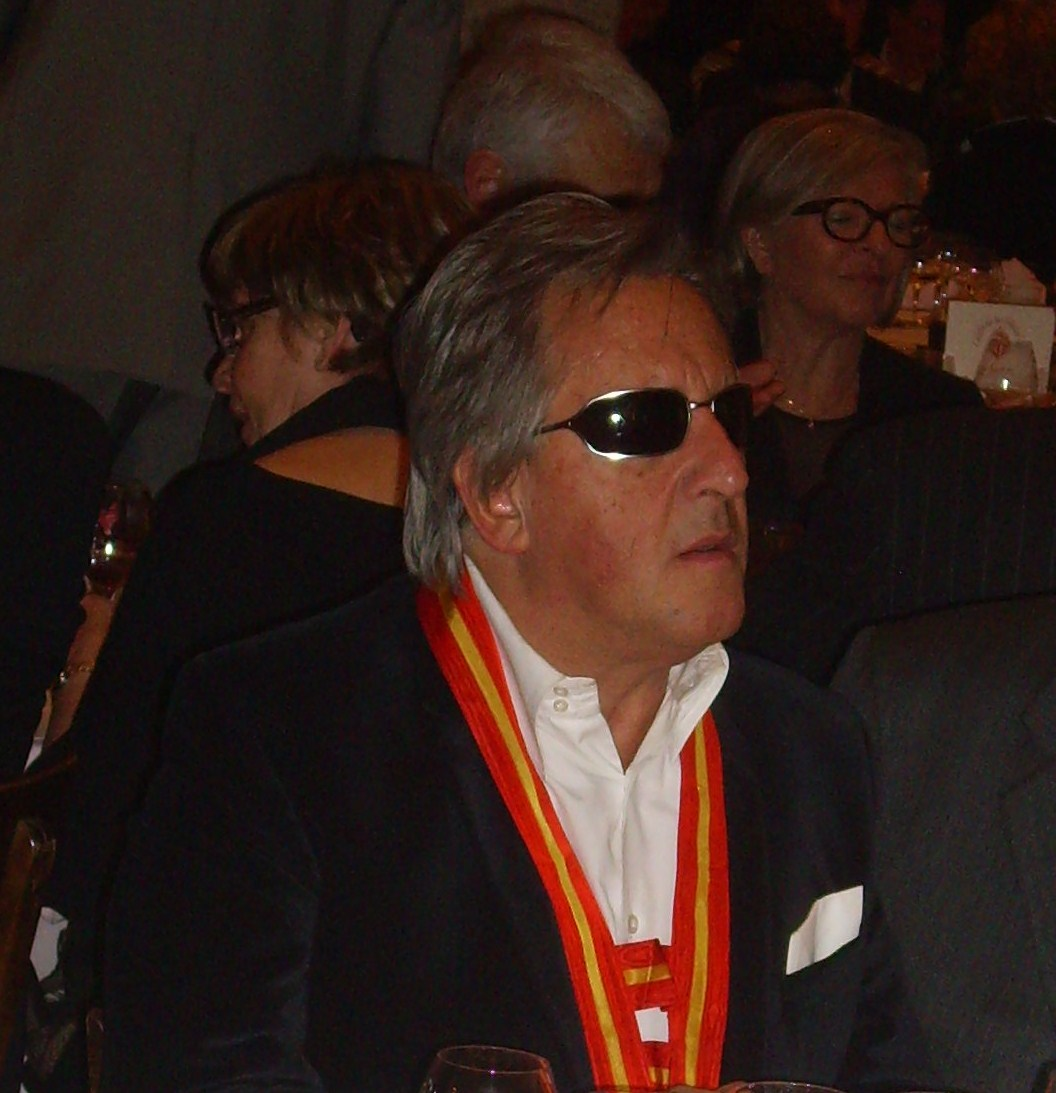
- Gilbert Montagné at the 2011 Saint-Vincent Tournante banquet held at the Château du Clos Vougeot in Burgundy

Background information
- Born: 28 December 1951 (age 74)
- Origin: 20th arrondissement of Paris, France
- Genres: Variétés, dance-pop, disco, blues
- Occupations: Singer, songwriter, pianist
- Instrument: Piano
- Years active: 1969–present
- Labels: Columbia, Carrere
- Website: https://www.gilbertmontagne.com/

Gilbert Montagné (French pronunciation: [ʒilbɛʁ mɔ̃taɲe]; born 28 December 1951) is a French singer, musician, pianist and organist from the Ménilmontant neighbourhood of Paris and Bourbonnais historical region of central France. Blind since shortly after birth, he is best known for his international hit "The Fool" which was a number 1 single across Europe and South America in 1971, as well as his songs "On va s'aimer" (1983) and "Les Sunlights des tropiques" (1984). In France, he is still a popular album and concert artist, having toured and sung with Johnny Hallyday and Kool & the Gang.

In 2009, he participated in the television show Rendez-vous en terre inconnue in Zanskar. He was made a Knight of the Order of Arts and Letters in 1982, an Officer in the National Order of Merit in 2011 and an Officer in the Order of the Legion of Honour in 2020.

Montagné was active in politics within the Union for a Popular Movement under the presidency of Nicolas Sarkozy. In the 2010 regional election, he ran as a candidate in Allier. Montagné is also noted for his activism for blind people. From ages 10 to 16, he was a student at the Institut National des Jeunes Aveugles (National Institute of Blind Youth) in Paris. In 2022, Saint-Léon, the village his father was originally from and Montagné visited as a child, named a square after him.

== Discography ==
=== Albums ===
- Gilbert Montagné (1971)
- Il faut que ça swing (1976)
- Ta vie (1981)
- Liberté (1984)
- Gilbert Montagné à l'Olympia LIVE (1985)
- Quelques notes de musiques (1985)
- Vivre en couleurs (1987)
- Entre douceur et violence (1989)
- En accord magique (1989)
- Rien qu'une amitié (1993)
- Comme une étoile (1995)
- Le meilleur compilation
- Mélange de couleurs (1997)
- Les plus belles chansons compilation (1997)
- Live à l'Olympia (1998)
- CD Story compilation (2001)
- Anthologie 3-CD box set (2001)
- Les indispensables compilation (2001)
- Rien sans ton amour (2002)
- Versions Originales compilation (2002)
- Ses plus belles chansons compilation (2002)
- Best of Gilbert Montagné compilation (2002)
- Get Ready (2006)

=== Singles ===
- "Quand on ferme les yeux"/"Le phénomène" (1969)
- "The Morning Comes" (1970)
- "The Fool"/"Hide Away" (1971)
- "Aime-moi"/"Song for Every Time" (1972)
- "Baby I Feel so Fine"/"My Lord" (1972)
- "Dans mon piano il y a des oiseaux"/"Elle chantait ma vie en musique" (1973)
- "M'laisse pas tomber" (1979)
- "Believe in Me"/"On the Road" (1979)
- "Besoin de vous" (1981)
- "On va s'aimer" (1983)
- "Just For Tonight" (1984)
- "Liberté" (1984)
- "Les sunlights des tropiques"/"Près de toi" (1984)
- "J'ai le blues de toi"/"Si je l'aime" (1984)
- "Au soleil – Robinson Crusoé"/"Un monde entre nous" (1984)
- "Je veux tout"/"Sans elle" (1987)
- "Perdu dans New-York" (1989)
- "Plus fort la vie"/"Open Your Heart (and Take a Chance)" (1990)
- "Un vrai Noël" (2001)
- "Entendre ton sourire"/"Si tu voulais" (2002)
