= Je m'appelle Bagdad =

Single by Tina Arena

from the album Un Autre Univers
- Released: 22 May 2006
- Genre: Pop
- Length: 4:19
- Label: Columbia
- Songwriters: David Gategno; Elodie Hesme
- Producer: David Gategno

Tina Arena singles chronology
| "Aimer jusqu'à l'impossible" (2005) | "Je m'appelle Bagdad" (2006) | "Tu aurais dû me dire (Oser parler d'amour)" (2006) |

"Je m'appelle Bagdad" is the second single to be released from Tina Arena's fifth studio album Un autre univers. It is a ballad with various orientalist themes. The song received significant airplay on French radio as did its predecessor "Aimer jusqu'à l'impossible".

Arena is quoted as saying the song's title, which roughly translates as "My Name Is Bagdad", is misleading. "This is not a political song and it’s not about a political subject. It’s a metaphor - like a poem. It’s a woman saying ... I was once beautiful and now I’m in ruins, I’m destroyed."

== Track listing ==
CD single

1. "Je m'appelle Bagdad" (David Gategno, Elodie Hesme) – 4:19
2. "Si j'avais le temps" (Tina Arena, Patrick Fiori, Vincent Hare) – 4:11
3. "Je m'appelle Bagdad (Remix)" (Gategno, Hesme) – 3:50

== Music video ==
The video for the song was filmed in February 2006 in the Tunisian desert and the Palace of Tozeur by Thierry Vergnes, who also directed the video for "Aimer jusqu'à l'impossible". About the video, Arena said, "There's always pressure to make a beautiful video but I really wanted tell the story of how complex humans are and how they can both create and destroy beautiful things." An Iraqi orthodontist living in France has also created a video, hosted on YouTube, of the song.

== Charts and certifications ==
=== Weekly charts ===
| Chart (2006) | Peak position |
|---|---|
| Belgian (Wallonia) Singles Chart | 8 |
| European Hot 100 Singles | 18 |
| French Singles Chart | 6 |
| French Digital Singles Chart | 7 |
| Swiss Singles Chart | 44 |

=== Year-end charts ===
| Chart (2006) | Position |
|---|---|
| Belgian (Wallonia) Singles Chart | 23 |
| French Airplay Chart | 86 |
| French Singles Chart | 31 |
| French TV Airplay Chart | 116 |

=== Certifications ===
| Region | Certification | Certified units/sales |
|---|---|---|
| France (SNEP) | Gold | 200,000^{*} |
^{*} Sales figures based on certification alone.
