= Jeff Panacloc =

French ventriloquist

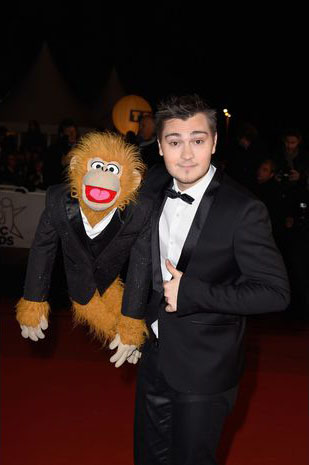
Jeff Panacloc and Jean-Marc, December 2014

Damien Colcanap, better known as Jeff Panacloc, is a French ventriloquist and stand-up comedian born on 8 September 1986 in Saint-Thibault-des-Vignes, Seine-et-Marne.

== Biography ==
A former electrician, Damien Colcanap met French ventriloquist David Michel at the age of 18 in a Parisian cabaret club. This was an eye-opener that led him to take an interest in ventriloquism and make a living from it.

In 2009, he became a full-time ventriloquist and took the stage name of Jeff Panacloc (the surname of which is his real surname written back to front). He wrote his first show, Jeff Panacloc et Jean-Marc (Jeff Panacloc and Jean-Marc), and performed it for 4 months at Le Temple Theatre. Jean-Marc, his puppet, is a politically incorrect, rude monkey with well-known retorts such as "Il est content !" ("He's happy!") and "Salut les trouducs !" ("Hi assholes!").

== Jean-Marc ==
Jean-Marc, Jeff Panacloc's puppet, is very rude and insults the audience, telling them they are trouducs (assholes) while he is on stage and during TV shows. A fan club, Team Trouduc, has also been created.

In 2014, Jeff and Jean-Marc released a single, J'suis quand même beau ("I'm handsome anyway"). In the summer of 2015, they released another single, J'temmerde, ("Go fuck yourself"), which they sang on Patrick Sébastien's TV show Fête de la musique, du soleil et des tubes on France 2.

== Notes and references ==
- Jeff Panacloc - Biography
- http://www.jeffpanacloc.net/presse.php
