= Les Mots bleus (album) =

Les Mots Bleus

Studio album by Christophe
- Released: 1974
- Genre: Pop rock
- Length: 34:33
- Label: Motors
- Producer: Francis Dreyfus

Christophe chronology
Les Paradis perdus (1973)	Les Mots Bleus (1974)	Olympia (1975)

Singles from Les Mots bleus
- 1. "Señorita" Released: 1974; 2. "Les mots bleus" Released: 1974

Les Mots bleus (English: Blue Words) is a 1974 album by French singer Christophe based on the ballad of the same name. Along with its groundbreaking predecessor album Les Paradis Perdus it revived the career of Christophe in the 1970s which, had taken a downturn following the initial success of "Aline" in 1965. Jean-Michel Jarre wrote the lyrics for the title track, which has been described as "outstanding" by Billboard magazine. It is considered one of the top albums and songs of French pop music. In 2010, the French edition of Rolling Stone magazine put it at number 45 in its list of the best albums of French rock.

== Inspiration ==
In 1974, Christophe took delivery of an Eminent brand synthesiser in Francis Dreyfus' recording studio. As he was experimenting with the keyboard of the synthesiser, he got the inspiration for the song "Les Mots Bleus", after which the album was named. Jean-Michel Jarre, who had already cooperated with Christophe in his groundbreaking album Les Paradis Perdus as the lyricist, after numerous attempts, finally wrote the lyrics for the music Christophe had composed on the synthesiser. During the studio recording of the song, a member of the chorus nearly fainted because he could not keep up with the arrangement and did not breathe at the appropriate time. After Les Mots Bleus, the cooperation between Jarre and Christophe was discontinued.

== Reception ==
In 2010, the French edition of Rolling Stone magazine put it at number 45 in its list of the best albums of French rock. Billboard magazine called the album outstanding. Les in Rocks asks "Who has not found their tears soaking the shoulder of a holiday romance on this ballad by Christophe?" and mentions that the song became a classic which cemented Christophe's place amongst the "great contemporary French singers". The critique continues, stating that this is one of the originals which has defined the 1970s "slow" and mentions that it contains "a funereal echo" and a "Rococo choir which accompanies the desperate voice of the artist". The lyrics by Jean Michel Jarre are described as "cliché without being cloying" and that the lyricist "succeeds by not falling into the sentimentality and clichés of the love song". The review concludes that after Jarre finished writing the lyrics for the song, he received a letter from Serge Gainsbourg welcoming him to the club, an acknowledgment that he was at the top of his profession, in the "big leagues".

The lyrics of Les Mots bleus and those of Les Paradis Perdus are considered notable examples of Jarre's talent as a lyricist. The lyrics have also been studied concerning the technique of using the future tense in the refrain, while transitioning to present tense in the subsequent verses.

The song is about Christophe's difficulty of declaring his feelings to his love.

== Covers ==
There is a cover of the song by Alain Bashung in his album Tu seras mon fils.

== Literature ==
The song is mentioned in the novel Je m'étais promis (entropie) and in Contes de l'amour ordinaire.

== Track listing ==
From Dreyfus records.

No.	Title	Length
1.	"Le dernier des Bevilacqua"	9:06
2.	"Señorita"	2:53
3.	"C'est la question"	4:33
4.	"Les Mots bleus"	4:12
5.	"La mélodie"	3:13
6.	"Le petit gars"	4:34
7.	"Drôle de vie"	4:33
8.	"Souvenirs"	1:21
