= Tibo InShape =

French vlogger (born 1992)

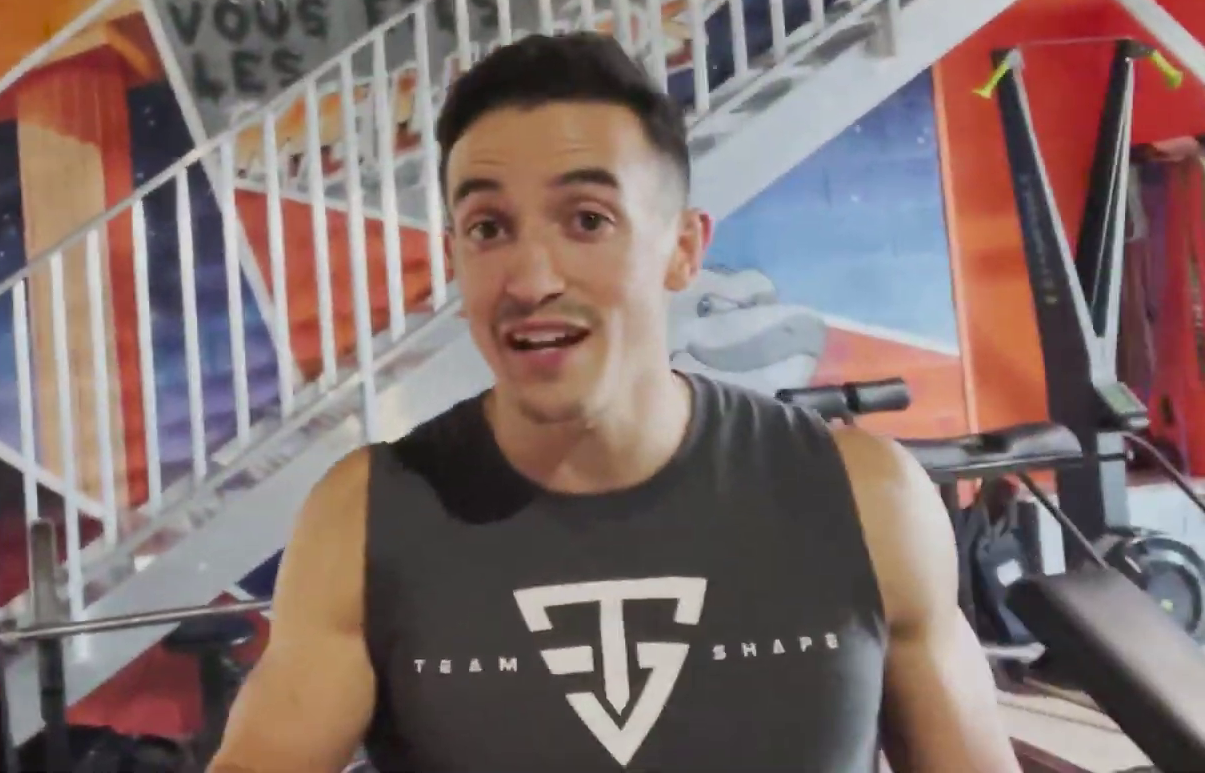
- Tibo InShape in 2021
- Born: Thibaud Marie Jacques André Delapart; 19 January 1992 (age 34); Toulouse, France
- Spouse: Justine Becattini (m. 2025)

YouTube information
- Channel: Tibo InShape
- Years active: 2013–present
- Subscribers: 26.8 million
- Views: 20.9 billion
- Last updated: 4 September 2025
- Website: tiboinshape.com/shop/

Tibo InShape, whose real name is Thibaud Delapart (born 19 January 1992), is a French YouTuber. He is the most well-known French-speaking YouTuber, with over 26.8 million subscribers and 20.9 billion views as of September 2025.

Known for his YouTube videos, this popular influencer was specialized in the field of bodybuilding. He subsequently diversified his videos, including a series of videos about discovering lesser-known jobs.

== Biography ==
As a student at Toulouse Business School, Thibaud Delapart started publishing bodybuilding videos on the YouTube platform under the pseudonym Tibo InShape during his final year of study. His audience exploded when he added humor to his bodybuilding and nutrition advice. He has built his renown thanks to social media and quickly got millions of subscribers, turning him into a sports star. His colloquial expressions such as "Daaamn!" at the beginning of his videos or "énorme et sec" (which means, huge and ripped) have become familiar YouTube-related expressions. In 2015, his success on the internet allowed him to launch an online clothing brand. As a bodybuilder, he confessed his exercise addiction in one of his videos. Bound by a contract to YouTube, he was nominated by the magazine Libération as one of the ten most influential French accounts in 2016.

He made most of his early videos in his room with a friend, but his fame now enables him to film in different places and to organize meetings with several personalities such as Christophe Lemaitre, Maïva Hamadouche or Esteban Ocon. In December 2017, the program Quotidien named him "Youtuber of the year 2017". His videos were then receiving an average of a million views each. He opened a weight room in September 2017. In 2018, he filmed two videos in the Albi maison d’arrêt (a category of prisons in French-speaking countries, similar to county jails in the United States), then three discovery videos about the Institut de recherche criminelle de la Gendarmerie nationale (the forensic science department of the French National Gendarmerie).

After stopping his bodybuilding videos, Thibaud Delapart has gone into the discovery of different lifestyles as well as popular or lesser-known occupations. His video published on March 20, 2019, was dedicated to the occupation of embalming, a video which has been the subject of much debate on the part of his subscriber community.

Between 2017 and 2019, he produced many institutional communication videos promoting the French Army, the French Navy, police, penitentiary administration, and also the Service national universel (General National Service), an indirect successor of military conscription. Those videos, totaling up to 4.5 million views (in July 2019), were claimed by Slate to have received between €20,000 and €30,000 in government funding.

== Controversy ==
=== 2014: First accusations ===
Several posts that Tibo InShape published between 2009 and 2012 on Facebook under his real name Thibaud Delapart have been accused of racism, homophobia, islamophobia and xenophobia and resurfaced on Jeuxvideo.com in 2015: "What is the point of spawning a massive population when we perfectly well know that we won't be able to treat or educate it, and that it will only be able to grow by parasitizing all other species?" (April 2009), "Toulouse and its cultural diversity ..." (November 2009), "I'm having fun throwing pork chops at Muslims, that’s cool, they burn" (January 2012).

In 2018, he accused "a guy who photoshopped my last name" of creating fake posts. However, he gave a different version of events the following year, saying his account had been hacked in 2013. The last of the four polemical messages was verified with records available in the Wayback Machine.

=== 2019: Promotion of universal national service ===
In August 2019, a controversy broke out over Tibo Inshape and other French YouTubers like Sundy Jules who promoted the Service national universel without explicitly specifying the sponsor, simply specifying that it was a commercial communication. Tibo Inshape reportedly received €20,000 from the French Ministry of Education for the video.

== Bibliography ==
- Tibo InShape and Lyle-Agnès Champart, Soyez une légende, Michel Lafon, August 24, 2017, 144 pages (ISBN 978-2749932583 and ISBN 2749932580)

== Discography ==
- 2016 : Énorme et sec
- 2020 : Clash Juju Fitcats
- 2020 : Réconciliation
- 2021 : Anniversaire (QDH)
