= Polnareff =

Polnareff is a surname. Notable people with the surname include:

- Jean Pierre Polnareff, fictional character from the Japanese manga JoJo's Bizarre Adventure
- Michel Polnareff (born 1944), French singer-songwriter, and namesake for the former.
