= Tina Arena discography =

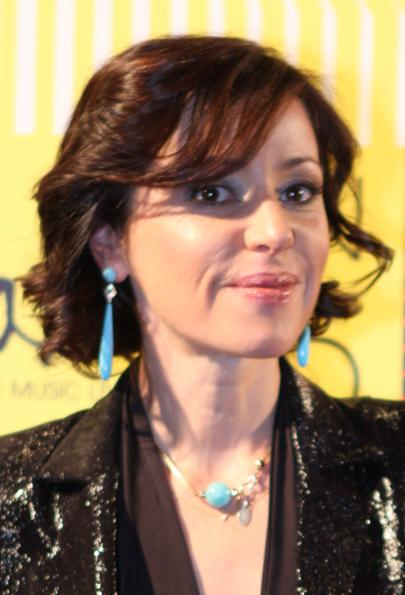
- Studio albums: 13
- Extended plays: 1
- Live albums: 4
- Compilation albums: 5
- Singles: 52
- Music videos: 43
- Other appearances: 37

Australian singer-songwriter Tina Arena has released thirteen studio albums, four live albums, four compilations, one extended play, fifty-two singles and forty-three music videos.

Arena began her career in 1976 at the age of eight, singing live on Australia's variety television show, Young Talent Time. After dropping out of the spotlight for several years, she returned in 1990 where she released her debut album Strong as Steel through EMI, which included the hit single "I Need Your Body". She was not comfortable with the image with which she was being portrayed so she went to find another record deal.

She found a record deal with the record label Columbia Records. Her second album, Don't Ask, was then created with producer David Tyson. It became her highest-selling album with two million copies sold worldwide.

She has sold more than 11 million records worldwide to date. In France, she has sold more than 2.2 million singles and 1.3 million albums. In Australia, she has sold 1.2 million certified albums and half a million singles.

== Albums ==
=== Studio albums ===
List of studio albums, with selected details, chart positions and certifications
Title	Album details	Chart positions									Certifications (sales thresholds)
Title	Album details	AUS	BEL (WA)	FRA	GER	NZ	SWE	SWI	UK	US	Certifications (sales thresholds)
Tiny Tina and Little John (with John Bowles)	Released: 1977; Label: Pisces	—	—	—	—	—	—	—	—	—	AUS: Gold
Strong as Steel	Released: October 1990; Label: EMI	17	—	—	—	—	—	—	—	—	
Don't Ask	Released: 21 November 1994; Label: Columbia	1	—	—	65	12	49	32	11	101	ARIA: 10× Platinum; BPI: Gold; RMNZ: Platinum
In Deep	Released: 18 August 1997; Label: Columbia	1	6	3	—	16	—	31	102	—	ARIA: 3× Platinum; BEA: Gold; IFPI SWI: Gold; SNEP: 3× Platinum
Just Me	Released: 12 November 2001; Label: Columbia	7	—	47	—	—	—	67	—	—	ARIA: Gold; SNEP: Gold
Un autre univers	Released: 5 December 2005; Label: Columbia	—	24	9	—	—	—	69	—	—	SNEP: Platinum
Songs of Love & Loss	Released: 1 December 2007; Label: EMI	3	35	31	—	—	—	—	—	—	ARIA: Platinum
7 vies	Released: 28 January 2008; Label: Columbia	—	16	12	—	—	—	56	—	—	SNEP: Gold
Songs of Love & Loss 2	Released: 15 November 2008; Label: EMI	12	—	—	—	—	—	—	—	—	ARIA: Gold
Reset	Released: 18 October 2013; Label: EMI	4	—	—	—	—	—	—	—	—	ARIA: Platinum
Eleven	Released: 30 October 2015; Label: EMI	2	—	—	—	—	—	—	—	—	ARIA: Gold
Quand tout Recommence	Released: 6 April 2018; Label: Positive Dream	—	46	62	—	—	—	—	—	—	
Love Saves	Released: 14 July 2023; Label: Positive Dream	2	—	—	—	—	—	—	—	—	
"—" denotes releases that did not chart or were not released in that country.

=== Compilation albums ===
List of compilation albums, with selected details, chart positions and certifications
Title	Album details	Chart positions			Certifications (sales thresholds)
Title	Album details	AUS	BEL (WA)	FRA	Certifications (sales thresholds)
Souvenirs	Released: November 2000; Label: Columbia	37	—	—	ARIA: Gold
Greatest Hits 1994–2004	Released: 25 October 2004; Label: Columbia	10	—	—	ARIA: Platinum
The Best & le meilleur	Released: 30 March 2009; Label: Sony France	—	11	2 (Note: French Compilation Chart)	
The Peel Me Sessions 2003	Released: 22 May 2009; Label: www.tinaarena.com	—	—	—	
Greatest Hits & Interpretations	Released: 7 April 2017; Label: EMI Music	2	—	—	ARIA: Gold
"—" denotes releases that did not chart or were not released in that country.

=== Live albums ===
List of live albums, with selected details, chart positions and certifications
Title	Album details	Chart positions	
Title	Album details	AUS	BEL (WA)
Vous êtes toujours là	Released: April 2003; Label: Columbia	—	31
Greatest Hits Live	Released: 9 October 2005; Label: Columbia	26 (Note: Australian Music DVD Chart)	—
Live: The Onstage Collection	Released: 15 January 2010; Label: Liberation	22	—
Symphony of Life	Released: 23 November 2012; Label: Ambition/EMI	60 (4)	—
"—" denotes releases that did not chart or were not released in that country.

=== Video albums ===
List of video albums, with selected details and certifications
Title	Details	Certification
Don't Ask – The Short Films	Released: 1995; Label: SMV Enterprises	
Greatest Hits 1994–2004	Released: 2004; Label: Sony BMG Music Entertainment	ARIA: Platinum
Greatest Hits Live	Released: 2005; Label: Sony BMG Music Entertainment,	ARIA: Platinum
Symphony of Life	Released: 2012; Label: Ais	ARIA: Gold
Reset Live	Released: 2016; Label: EMI	

== Extended plays ==
List of EPs, with selected details
Title	Details	Peak chart positions
Title	Details	AUS
Way of the World	Released: 16 October 2026; Label: Positive Dream	11

== Singles ==
=== As lead artist ===
List of singles, with selected chart positions and certifications
Title	Year	Chart positions								Certifications	Album
Title	Year	AUS	BEL (WA)	FRA	GER	NZ	SWI	UK	US	Certifications	Album
"Turn Up the Beat"	1985	92	—	—	—	—	—	—	—		Non-album single
"I Need Your Body"	1990	3	—	—	—	—	—	—	—	ARIA: Platinum	Strong as Steel
"The Machine's Breaking Down"	1990	23	—	—	—	—	—	—	—		Strong as Steel
"Strong as Steel"	1990	30	—	—	—	—	—	—	—		Strong as Steel
"Woman's Work"	1991	—	—	—	—	—	—	—	—		Strong as Steel
"Chains"	1994	4	—	—	68	7	—	6	38	ARIA: 2× Platinum; BPI: Silver	Don't Ask
"Sorrento Moon (I Remember)"	1995	7	—	—	86	16	—	22	—	ARIA: Platinum; RMNZ: Gold	Don't Ask
"Heaven Help My Heart"	1995	22	—	—	77	33	—	25	—	ARIA: Gold	Don't Ask
"Wasn't It Good"	1995	11	—	—	—	—	—	—	—	ARIA: Gold	Don't Ask
"Show Me Heaven"	1995	—	—	—	78	33	—	29	— (Note: "Show Me Heaven" did not enter the Billboard Hot 100, but peaked at number three on the Bubbling Under Hot 100 Singles chart.)		Don't Ask
"That's the Way a Woman Feels"	1996	31	—	—	—	—	—	—	—		Don't Ask
"Burn" (Note: The Italian version is titled "Ti voglio qui".)	1997	2	—	—	—	36	—	47	—	ARIA: Platinum	In Deep
"If I Didn't Love You"	1997	41	—	—	—	—	—	—	—		In Deep
"Now I Can Dance"	1998	13	—	—	—	—	—	—	—	ARIA: Gold	In Deep
"Whistle Down the Wind"	1998	—	—	—	—	—	—	24	—		In Deep
"I Want to Know What Love Is"	1998	36	39	13	—	—	—	—	—	SNEP: Gold	In Deep
"I Want to Spend My Lifetime Loving You" (with Marc Anthony)	1998	—	9	3	—	—	34	—	—	SNEP: Gold	In Deep
"If I Was a River"	1998	—	—	—	—	—	—	43	—		In Deep
"Aller plus haut"	1999	—	1	2	—	—	96	—	—	SNEP: Platinum	In Deep
"Segnali di Fumo" (with Luca Barbarossa)	2000	—	—	78	—	—	—	—	—		In Deep
"Les trois cloches"	2000	—	1	4	—	—	49	—	—	SNEP: Gold	In Deep
"Live for the One I Love"	2000	—	—	—	—	—	—	63	—		Notre-Dame de Paris
"Soul Mate #9"	2001	22	—	—	—	—	77	—	—		Just Me
"Dare You to Be Happy"	2002	43	—	—	—	—	—	—	—		Just Me
"Tu es toujours là"	2002	—	15	11	—	—	—	—	—	SNEP: Gold	Just Me
"Symphony of Life" (Note: The French version is titled "Symphonie de l'âme".)	2002	8	—	48	—	—	—	—	—		Just Me
"Je te retrouve un peu" (with Jay)	2003	—	—	44	—	—	—	—	—		Vous êtes toujours là
"Never (Past Tense)" (Roc Project featuring Arena)	2003	—	—	—	—	—	—	42	97		Vous êtes toujours là
"Italian Love Song"	2004	33	—	—	—	—	—	—	—		Greatest Hits 1994–2004
"Aimer jusqu'à l'impossible"	2005	—	1	3	—	—	16	—	—	BEA: Gold; SNEP: Platinum	Un autre univers
"Je m'appelle Bagdad"	2006	—	8	6	—	—	44	—	—	SNEP: Gold	Un autre univers
"Tu aurais dû me dire (Oser parler d'amour)"	2006	—	36	37	—	—	—	—	—		Un autre univers
"Entends-tu le monde?"	2007	—	32	10	—	—	—	—	—		7 vies
"To Sir with Love"	2007	62	—	—	—	—	—	—	—		Songs of Love & Loss
"Oh Me, Oh My"	2008	189	—	—	—	—	—	—	—		Songs of Love & Loss 2
"Voici les clés" (Gérard Lenorman featuring Arena)	2011	—	—	48	—	—	—	—	—		Duos de mes chansons
"You Set Fire to My Life"	2013	38	—	—	—	—	—	—	—		Reset
"Reset All"	2013	—	—	—	—	—	—	—	—		Reset
"Still Running"	2014	—	—	—	—	—	—	—	—		Reset
"The Things We Do for Love"	2014	—	—	—	—	—	—	—	—		Non-album single
"I Want to Love You"	2015	72	—	—	—	—	—	—	—		Eleven
"Chains" (with Jessica Mauboy and The Veronicas)	2015	14	—	—	—	—	—	—	—		Non-album single
"A Foreign Affair" (Client Liaison featuring Arena)	2017	—	—	—	—	—	—	—	—		Diplomatic Immunity
"Tant que tu es là"	2017	—	—	—	—	—	—	—	—		Quand tout Recommence
"L'ombre de ma voix"	2018	—	—	—	—	—	—	—	—		Quand tout Recommence
"Church"	2021	—	—	—	—	—	—	—	—		Love Saves
"This Woman's Work" (live)	2021	—	—	—	—	—	—	—	—		Non-album single
"House"	2023	—	—	—	—	—	—	—	—		Love Saves
"Dancing on Thin Ice" (Note: The French version is titled "Danser sur la Glace".)	2023	—	—	—	—	—	—	—	—		Love Saves
"Je me rapproche"	2023	—	—	—	—	—	—	—	—		Non-album singles
"Chains" (re-recorded; with Shouse)	2024	—	—	—	—	—	—	—	—		Non-album singles
"True Faith"	2026	—	—	—	—	—	—	—	—		Way of the World
"—" denotes releases that did not chart or were not released in that country.

=== Promotional singles ===
List of promotional singles
Title	Year	Album
"The Flame"	2000	The Games of the XXVII Olympiad 2000: Music from the Opening Ceremony
"L'un pour l'autre"	2007	7 vies
"Night Fever"	2008	Disco
"7 vies"	2009	Le Best & le Meilleur
"Don't Hide"	2014	Reset
"Je Dis Call Me"	2015	Songs of Love & Loss (European edition)
"Overload"	2015	Eleven
"Unstoppable" (with Ngaiire)	2026	Red Cross Lifeblood

== Other charted songs ==
List of other charted songs
Title	Year	Chart position	Album
Title	Year	AUS	Album
"Only Lonely"	2013	32	Reset
"Overload"	2015	176	Eleven

== Other appearances ==
List of other non-single song appearances
Title	Year	Album
"Alexander Beetle"	1977	Sing Sing Sing (The Young Talent Team album)
"You're The One That I Want" (with John Bowles)	1980	Sing the Hits (The Young Talent Team album)
"MacArthur Park"	1980	Sing the Hits (The Young Talent Team album)
"The First Noel	1994	The Spirit of Christmas '94
"Trust Me This Is Love" (with Rick Price)	1995	Tamborine Mountain
"Love's Funny That Way"	1996	One Fine Day (soundtrack)
"No More Tears (Enough Is Enough)" (live) (with Donna Summer)	1999	Live & More Encore
"Cheap Wine"	2000	The Andrew Denton Breakfast Show Musical Challenge
"The Bohemienne Song"	2000	Notre-Dame De Paris
"The Pagan Ave Maria"	2000	Notre-Dame De Paris
"The Birds They Put in Cages" (with Garou)	2000	Notre-Dame De Paris
"The Day the World Stood Still" (with Edmund Choi, Melbourne Symphony Orchestra and Australian Boys Choir)	2000	The Dish (soundtrack)
"One Little Christmas Tree"	2000	The Spirit of Christmas 2000
"I'll Come Runnin'" (with Olivia Newton-John)	2002	2 (Olivia Newton-John album)
"Comme Toi" (with Assia, Julie Zenatti and Lorie)	2003	Les Enfants de la Terre
"I'm in Trouble" (with Zucchero)	2004	Zu & Co. (Australian edition)
"White Christmas"	2005	The Spirit of Christmas 2005
"Non, Je ne Regrette Rien" (with Kaas, Garou and Lavoine)	2006	2006 Le Village Des Enfoirés
"Timeless" (with Kane Alexander)	2006	Kane Alexander
"Le Brio" (with Mulder)	2007	2007 La Caravane Des Enfoirés
"En Apensanteur" (with Fiori, Obispo and Keim)	2008	2008 Les Secrets Des Enfoirés
"Je N'Ai Pas Changé" (with Bénabar, Darmon and Leroy)	2008	2008 Les Secrets Des Enfoirés
"I Want to Know What Love Is" (with Hallyday, Lââm, Dion, Lara and Petits Chanteurs De Strasbourg)	2008	2008 Les Secrets Des Enfoirés
"Don't Give Up" (with Jeff Martin)	2009	The RocKwiz Duets Volume III: The Beat Goes On
"Voyage au Pays des Vivants" (with Maé, Lorie and De Palmas)	2009	2009 Les Enfoirés Font Leur Cinéma
"On S'Attache" (with Obispo, Laroque, Aubert, Bruel)	2009	2009 Les Enfoirés Font Leur Cinéma
"Last Christmas"	2010	The Spirit of Christmas 2010
"L'Assasymphonie" (with Fiori, Nolwenn Leroy, Obispo, Kaas, Jenifer and Zaz)	2011	2011 Dans L'Oeil Des Enfoirés
"Comme D'Habitude" (with Bruel, Willem, Aubert, Obispo, Kaas, Jenifer and Zaz)	2011	2011 Dans L'Oeil Des Enfoirés
"Je Me Lâche" (with Lorie, St Pier, Maunier, Luce, Lââm, Laroque, Bent and Zazie)	2011	2011 Dans L'Oeil Des Enfoirés
"Stone Cold" (with Jimmy Barnes and Joe Bonamassa)	2014	30:30 Hindsight
"La Chanson du Bénévole" (with M. Pokora, Lavoine, Maé, Tal, Bruel, and Les Enfoirés)	2014	2014 Bon Anniversaire Les Enfoirés
"J'en rêve encore" (with Garou)	2014	Kiss & Love
"The First Noel"	2015	The Spirit Of Christmas 2015
"So Far Away"	2017	Beautiful - A Tribute to Carole King
"Chains" (live)	2020	Fire Fight Australia
"Bang Bang" (So Frenchy So Chic)	2022	Ye Ye 2.0

== Music videos ==
List of music videos
Year	Song	Director
1985	"Turn Up the Beat"	
1990	"I Need Your Body"	
1990	"The Machine's Breaking Down"	
1990	"Strong as Steel"	
1994	"Chains" (Australian version)	
1995	"Chains" (international version)	Randee St. Nicholas
1995	"Sorrento Moon (I Remember)"	
1995	"Heaven Help My Heart"	
1995	"Wasn't It Good"	
1995	"Show Me Heaven"	Nigel Dick
1997	"Burn"	Pierre Baroni
1997	"If I Didn't Love You"	
1998	"Now I Can Dance"	Pierre Baroni
1998	"Whistle Down the Wind"	Greg Masuak
1998	"I Want to Know What Love Is"	
1998	"I Want to Spend My Lifetime Loving You"	Nigel Dick
1998	"If I Was a River"	Pierre Baroni
1999	"Aller plus haut"	Yannick Saillet
1999	"Les trois cloches"	
1999	"Segnali di fumo"	
1999	"Live for the One I Love"	
2000	"The Flame"	Mark Hartley
2001	"Soul Mate #9"	Bart Borghesi
2002	"Dare You to Be Happy"	
2002	"Tu es toujours la"	Yannick Saillet
2002	"Symphony of Life"	
2003	"Never (Past Tense)"	Anders Hallberg
2003	"Je te retrouve un peu"	Cyril Sébas
2004	"Italian Love Song"	
2005	"Aimer jusqu'à l'impossible"	Thierry Vergnes
2006	"Je m'appelle Bagdad"	Thierry Vergnes
2006	"Tu aurais du me dire (Oser parler d'amour)"	
2007	"Entends-tu le monde?"	Fabien Dufils
2008	"Oh Me Oh My"	
2013	"You Set Fire to My Life"	Jennifer Leacey
2013	"Only Lonely"	
2014	"Still Running"	Yannick Saillet
2015	"Je Dis Call Me"	Michael Westbrook
2015	"I Want to Love You"	
2017	"A Foreign Affair"	
2017	"Tant que tu es là"	Julien Bloch
2018	"L'ombre de ma voix"	
2021	"Church"	
2021	"This Woman's Work" (live)	
2023	"House"	Kidd Suave
2023	"Love Saves"	
2023	"Je me rapproche"	
