= Greatest Hits & Interpretations =

Greatest hits album by Tina Arena
- Released: 7 April 2017
- Recorded: 1988–2017
- Genre: Pop
- Labels: Positive Dream, EMI Music Australia

Tina Arena chronology
Eleven (2015)	Greatest Hits & Interpretations (2017)	Quand tout Recommence (2018)

Greatest Hits & Interpretations is the fifth compilation album by Australian singer Tina Arena, released by EMI Music Australia on 7 April 2017. The album is a 2-CD set—the first contains 17 of Arena's hits; the second is an album of interpretations. The interpretations disc includes a duet with Dannii Minogue, singing with Arena for the first time since Young Talent Time. The album was certified gold in Australia in 2019.

== Background and release ==
2017 marks Arena's 40th year in music and the 40th anniversary of her first album, Tiny Tina and Little John. On 2 March, via her Instagram, Arena said: "This year I'm celebrating 40 years in showbiz, who would have thought that 9 year old girl on TV four decades ago would end up here? I couldn't let this year pass without doing something really special, so we've created a new double album". She added "Disc 1 is called 'Retrospective' and it is a definitive collection of all my singles. Disc 2 is called 'Reimagine' and it features some of my favorite musicians, reinterpreting songs from my career".

In a further statement Arena said, "The whole premise of this record for me was about the other artists, how the other artists perceived that body of work. It was about them having the freedom to be able to do it the way they want to do it". Reflecting on the project, Arena adds, "I've always been my harshest critic, that will never change. For me it's all about the quality of the songwriting – it's got to make you feel something and this collection makes me feel something. And I go, "Yes, I've done okay"... I'm proud of the collaborations I've had, of the things I've learned, of the things I continue to learn. I've loved working with the people I've worked with over the years. It's really fulfilling."

The album became available for pre-order on 3 March 2017 and came with the instant grat track "Wouldn't It Be Good", lifted from Arena's 2008 album, Songs of Love & Loss 2.

== Reception ==
Professional ratings
Review scores
Source	Rating
Herald Sun	4/5 stars
auspOp	4/5 stars

Cameron Adams from the Herald Sun said: "This new career overview demonstrates Arena is still fearless - and peerless", adding: "'Chains' should sit with 'You're the Voice' and 'The Horses' as a national anthem."

Jeff Jenkins from Stack Magazine called the album "glorious".

David from AuspOp said the album "includes all her biggest hits spanning almost 30 years, but it also contains some incredible covers by some incredible artists." adding "Whoever came up with this idea is a genius." David said "Everything you’ve ever loved about Tina features across all her greatest hits" but said it's the second disc "where things get really interesting" saying "(the) interpretations of Tina’s songs are so incredibly diverse and breathe new life into her tunes."

== Track listing ==
Greatest Hits (Retrospective)
No.	Title	Writer(s)	Original Album	Length
1.	"I Need Your Body"	Doug Brady, Ross Inglis	Strong as Steel	4:03
2.	"The Machine's Breaking Down"	Doug Brady, Ross Inglis	Strong as Steel	4:35
3.	"Strong as Steel"	Diane Warren	Strong as Steel	5:05
4.	"Chains"	Tina Arena, Pam Reswick, Steve Werfel	Don't Ask	4:21
5.	"Sorrento Moon (I Remember)"	Tina Arena, David Tyson, Christopher Ward	Don't Ask	4:53
6.	"Heaven Help My Heart" (radio edit)	Tina Arena, Dean McTaggart, David Tyson	Don't Ask	4:29
7.	"Wasn't It Good"	Tina Arena, Heather Field, Robert Parde	Don't Ask	5:13
8.	"Burn"	Tina Arena, Pam Reswick, Steve Werfel	In Deep	4:44
9.	"Now I Can Dance" (single edit)	Tian Arena, David Tyson	In Deep	4:05
10.	"If I Didn't Love You"	Tina Arena, David Tyson, Christopher Ward	In Deep	5:01
11.	"Soul Mate #9"	Peter Amato, Tina Arena, Desmond Child	Just Me	3:25
12.	"Symphony of Life"	Tina Arena, Peter-John Vettese	Just Me	4:43
13.	"Never (Past Tense)" (Roc Project featuring Tina Arena)	Ray Roc Checo, Aida Lorenzo-Checo, Pamela Lewis, Sam Onervas, Petra Hallberg, Max Reich	Vous êtes toujours là	3:44
14.	"You Set Fire to My Life"	Anders Wollbeck, Mattias Lindblom, Tina Arena	Reset	4:13
15.	"Only Lonely"	Tina Arena, Alex Hope, Roberto De Sá	Reset	3:22
16.	"Reset All"	Tina Arena, Hunter Nixon, Lindsay Rimes	Reset	3:46
17.	"I Want to Love You"	Tina Arena, Jon Hume, Hayley Warner, Ben Fielding, Tom Jordan, Penelope Austin	Eleven	5:12

Interpretations (Reimagine)
No.	Title	Writer(s)	Performer(s)	Length
1.	"If I Didn't Love You"	Tina Arena, David Tyson, Christopher Ward	Morgan Evans	3:33
2.	"Sorrento Moon"	Tina Arena, David Tyson, Christopher Ward	Dannii Minogue featuring Tina Arena	3:36
3.	"Still Running"	Tina Arena, Hayley Warner, Louis Schoorl	Clare Bowen	4:06
4.	"Chains"	Tina Arena, Pam Reswick, Steve Werfel	Tina Arena, Jessica Mauboy and The Veronicas	4:01
5.	"Only Lonely"	Tina Arena, Alex Hope, Roberto De Sá	Alex Hope	3:27
6.	"Wasn't It Good"	Tina Arena, Heather Field, Robert Parde	Ben Abraham and Ainslie Wills	4:04
7.	"I Need Your Body"	Doug Brady, Ross Inglis	David Thibault	4:35
8.	"When You're Ready"	Tina Arena, Jon Hume, Kate Miller-Heidke	Jimmy Barnes	3:57
9.	"Burn"	Tina Arena, Pam Reswick, Steve Werfel	Katie Noonan	4:48
10.	"Heaven Help My Heart"	Tina Arena, David Tyson, Dean McTaggart	Kate Miller-Heidke	4:33
11.	"Wouldn't It Be Good"	Nik Kershaw	Tina Arena	3:52
12.	"I Want to Know What Love Is"	Mick Jones	Tina Arena	6:20
13.	"Show Me Heaven"	Maria McKee, Eric Rackin, Jay Rifkin	Tina Arena	4:19
14.	"Never Tear Us Apart"	Andrew Farriss, Michael Hutchence	Tina Arena	2:50

== Charts ==
=== Weekly charts ===
Chart performance for Greatest Hits & Interpretations
Chart (2017)	Peak position
Australian Albums (ARIA)	2

=== Year-end charts ===
Chart (2017)	Position
Australian Albums (ARIA)	33

== Certifications ==
Region	Certification	Certified units/sales
Australia (ARIA)	Gold	35,000^{‡}
^{‡} Sales+streaming figures based on certification alone.

== Release history ==
List of release dates, showing region, formats, label and editions
Region	Date	Format(s)	Label	Catalogue
Australia	7 April 2017	CD; digital download	Positive Dream, EMI Music Australia	5747997
