= Greatest Hits Live (Tina Arena album) =

Live album by Tina Arena
- Released: 9 October 2005
- Recorded: 7 December 2004
- Venue: Sydney State Theatre
- Genre: Pop
- Length: 77:51 (CD)
- Label: Columbia

Tina Arena chronology
Greatest Hits 1994–2004 (2004)	Greatest Hits Live (2005)	Un autre univers (2005)

Greatest Hits Live is the second live album by Australian singer Tina Arena which was recorded during her 2004 Greatest hits Australian tour and released in late 2005. It was Arena's first live album to be released in her native Australia because Vous Êtes Toujours Là (2003) was only released in France. The album contains a CD and DVD featuring her concert recorded on 7 December 2004 at the Sydney State Theatre.

== Track listing ==
1. "Soul Mate #9" (Peter Amato, Tina Arena, Desmond Child) – 4:47
2. "Take Me Apart" (Fiona Kernaghan) – 4:00
3. "If I Didn't Love You" (Arena, Pam Reswick, Steve Werfel) – 4:47
4. "That's the Way a Woman Feels" (Arena, Reswick, Werfel) – 5:53
5. "I Want to Know What Love Is" (Mick Jones) – 6:09
6. "Wasn't It Good" (Arena, Heather Field, Robert Parde) – 5:09
7. "Les trois cloches (The Three Bells)" (Jean Villard) – 4:50
8. "Burn" (Arena, Reswick, Werfel) – 5:08
9. "You Made Me Find Myself" (Arena, Child, Ty Lacy) – 3:50
10. "Italian Love Song" (Arena, Francesco De Benedettis, Davide Esposito, Paul Manners) – 3:55
11. "Symphony of Life" (Arena, Peter-John Vettese) – 4:51
12. "Sorrento moon" (Arena, David Tyson, Christopher Ward) – 4:57
13. "Heaven Help My Heart" (Arena, Dean McTaggart, Tyson) – 6:27
14. "Chains" (Arena, Reswick, Werfel) – 7:03
15. "Dare You to Be Happy" (Arena, Vettese) – 6:16

Note

- The DVD track listing is identical to the CD except "Italian Love Song" is replaced with "Now I Can Dance" (Arena, Tyson).

== Personnel ==
- Tina Arena – vocals
- Paul Gray – piano, keyboards, musical director
- Kere Buchanan – drums, percussion
- Nick Sinclair – bass
- Chris Kamzelas – guitars
- Chris E Thomas – guitar, backing vocals
- Angie Bekker – backing vocals

== Charts and certifications ==
Chart (2005)	Peak position
Australian Music DVD Chart	26

== Certification (DVD) ==
Region	Certification	Certified units/sales
Australia (ARIA)	Platinum	15,000^{^}
^{^} Shipments figures based on certification alone.
