= The Best & le meilleur =

Greatest hits album by Tina Arena
- Released: 30 March 2009
- Recorded: 1994–2008
- Genre: Pop
- Label: Sony France

Tina Arena chronology
Songs of Love & Loss 2 (2008)	The Best & le meilleur (2009)	The Peel Me Sessions 2003 (2009)

The Best & le meilleur is the third compilation album and the second greatest hits album by Australian singer and songwriter Tina Arena and was released on 30 March 2009 in France. The album also received a digital release on the iTunes Store in her native Australia in early April 2009.

The album contains three new recordings, "This Universe", "Night Fever", and "Out Here on My Own", a duet with Patrick Fiori. "This Universe" is an English-language version of the Italian song "Io so che tu" by Davide Esposito. The song was also the most successful single for the French singer Grégory Lemarchal when released as "Ecris l'histoire" in 2005. Esposito's version was released in 2006 and peaked at number 20 on the French singles chart. "Night Fever" is a cover of the Bee Gees song, popularised by the Saturday Night Fever soundtrack, and it was recorded for a French TV disco special.

The album peaked at number two on the French Compilations chart, falling out of the top ten in its fifth week and spending only eight weeks in the top 30. It also peaked at number 11 on the Belgian (Wallonia) Albums Chart and spent 23 weeks in the top 100.

== Track listing ==
No.	Title	Writer(s)	Length
1.	"Aller plus haut"	J. Kapler	5:05
2.	"I Want to Spend My Lifetime Loving You" (duet with Marc Anthony)	James Horner, Will Jennings	4:42
3.	"Aimer jusqu'à l'impossible"	David Gategno, Elodie Hesme	3:19
4.	"I Want to Know What Love Is"	Mick Jones	6:21
5.	"Les trois cloches"	Christophe Battaglia, J. Kapler	5:18
6.	"Je m'appelle Bagdad"	Gategno, Hesme	4:18
7.	"Night Fever"	Barry Gibb, Maurice Gibb, Robin Gibb	3:41
8.	"Tu es toujours là"	Jacques Veneruso	3:14
9.	"Entends-tu le monde?"	Thione Seck	3:56
10.	"Live (For the One I Love)"	Richard Cocciante, Jennings, Luc Plamondon	3:38
11.	"Symphony of Life"	Arena, Peter-John Vettese	4:45
12.	"Chains"	Arena, Pam Reswick, Steve Werfel	4:18
13.	"L'un pour l'autre"	Gategno, Hesme	3:23
14.	"7 vies"	Arena, Gategno, Hesme	3:46
15.	"Tu pourras dire"	Patrick Fiori, Noam Kaniel, Zarb	4:14
16.	"Tu aurais dû me dire (Oser parler d'amour)"	Mathias Goudeau, Kapler	3:22
17.	"Et puis après" (duet with Henri Salvador)	Henri Salvador	2:44
18.	"This Universe"	Francesco de Benedittis, Davide Esposito	4:15
19.	"Out Here on My Own" (duet with Patrick Fiori)	Michael Gore	3:18

== Charts ==
=== Weekly charts ===
Chart (2009)	Peak position
Belgian Albums (Ultratop Wallonia)	11
French Compilation Albums (SNEP)	2

=== Year-end charts ===
Chart (2009)	Position
Belgian Albums (Ultratop Wallonia)	87
