= Greatest Hits 1994–2004 =

Greatest hits album by Tina Arena
- Released: 25 October 2004
- Recorded: 1994–2004
- Genre: Pop
- Length: 78:24
- Label: Columbia
- Producer: Robert Goldman; Mick Jones; Jim Steinman; David Tyson; Peter-John Vettese

Tina Arena chronology
Vous êtes toujours là (2003)	Greatest Hits 1994–2004 (2004)	Greatest Hits Live (2005)

Singles from Greatest Hits 1994–2004
- 1. "Italian Love Song" Released: 5 November 2004

Professional ratings
Review scores
Source	Rating
Allmusic	4/5 stars

Greatest Hits 1994–2004 is the second compilation album by Australian singer Tina Arena, released by Columbia Records in Australia on 25 October 2004. It is a greatest hits album that contains all the singles released during her ten years signed with Columbia and also features two new songs. A limited edition was released with a second disc containing her non-English language singles. This compilation album was also released in DVD format and featured all of the music videos she did with Sony plus music videos for several of Arena's French hits. The DVD had the same cover as this audio release. Arena states that all the songs on the album are deeply personal and represent different periods and experiences of her life. Greatest Hits 1994–2004 debuted in the top ten on the Australian ARIA Albums Chart making the album Arena's fourth top ten album. The album only produced one single, "Italian Love Song", which failed to make a major impact on the Australian ARIA Singles Chart just managing a peak within the top forty.

As a singer-songwriter, Arena felt she had worked "really hard to try to tell a story and hope that people identify with it in some way, whether they do when they listen to it for the first time or five years later. It's like passing something on and that's always been my philosophy." Arena states that the album cover feels really rich to her and timeless. She also states "I wanted to go with something interesting, not just a photo, and I wanted it to look iconic. I thought the idea of a watercolour painting was also kind of symbolic because it's got some detail but it's kind of... unfinished."

== Track listing ==
No.	Title	Writer(s)	Length
1.	"Italian Love Song"	Tina Arena, Paul Manners, Francesco De Bendittis, Davide Esposito	3:51
2.	"Chains"	Arena, Pam Reswick, Steve Werfel	4:03
3.	"Burn"	Arena, Pam Reswick, Steve Werfel	4:24
4.	"Wasn't It Good"	Arena, Heather Field, Robert Parde	4:10
5.	"Sorrento Moon (I Remember)"	Arena, Tyson, Christopher Ward	4:22
6.	"Now I Can Dance" (single edit)	Arena, Tyson	4:06
7.	"Soul Mate #9" (single version)	Peter Amato, Arena, Desmond Child	3:25
8.	"Heaven Help My Heart" (radio version)	Arena, Dean McTaggart, David Tyson	4:31
9.	"Symphony of Life"	Arena, Vettese	4:46
10.	"That's the Way a Woman Feels" (The New Horns mix)	Arena, Reswick, Werfel	4:22
11.	"If I Didn't Love You"	Arena, Reswick, Werfel	4:37
12.	"I Want to Know What Love Is"	Mick Jones	4:50
13.	"Dare You to Be Happy" (remix)	Arena, Peter-John Vettese	4:34
14.	"Show Me Heaven"	Maria McKee, Eric Rackin, Jay Rifkin	4:20
15.	"If I Was a River"	Diane Warren	5:20
16.	"Never (Past Tense)" (radio edit)		3:44
17.	"I Want to Spend My Lifetime Loving You" (duet with Marc Anthony)	James Horner, Will Jennings	4:43
18.	"Take Me Apart"	Fiona Kernaghan	4:02

Limited edition bonus disc
No.	Title	Writer(s)	Length
1.	"Aller plus haut"	J. Kapler
2.	"Les trois cloches"	Jean Villard
3.	"Tu es toujours là"	Jacques Veneruso
4.	"Cœur de pierre"	David Hallyday, Eric Chermonny
5.	"Si je ne t'aimais pas"	Arena, Tyson, Christopher Ward
6.	"Je te retrouve un peu" (duet with Jay)	Veneruso
7.	"Symphonie de l'âme" (single version)	Arena, Vettese
8.	"Ti Voglio Qui" (radio version)	Arena, Reswick, Werfel
9.	"Segnali di fumo" (duet with Luca Barbarossa)	Barbarossa

== Charts and certifications ==
=== Weekly charts ===
Chart (2004)	Peak position
Australian Albums Chart	10

=== Certifications ===
Region	Certification	Certified units/sales
Australia (ARIA)	Platinum	70,000^{‡}
^{‡} Sales+streaming figures based on certification alone.

=== Certification (DVD) ===
Region	Certification	Certified units/sales
Australia (ARIA)	Platinum	15,000^{^}
^{^} Shipments figures based on certification alone.
