= Tant que tu es là =

Single by Tina Arena

from the album Quand tout Recommence
- Released: 17 November 2017
- Recorded: 2017
- Length: 3:33
- Label: Positive Dream, Play Two
- Songwriter(s): Alexandra Maquet, Mark Weld

Tina Arena singles chronology
"A Foreign Affair" (2017)	"Tant que tu es là" (2017)	"L'ombre de ma voix" (2018)

Music video
- "Tant que tu es là" on YouTube

"Tant que tu es là" (English "As long as you're around") is a song written by Alexandra Maquet and Mark Weld, recorded by Australian singer Tina Arena. The song was released in November 2017 as the lead single from Arena's third French language studio album Quand tout Recommence (2018).

It is the first original French-language material released by Arena since her 2008 album 7 vies and marks the beginning of her collaboration with French record label Play Two.

== Background ==
After the French release of concept record Love & Loss in 2015 and the end of her collaboration with Capitol Records, Tina Arena focused primarily on her Australian career and celebrated four decades in the entertainment industry with the retrospective record Greatest Hits & Interpretations.

On 21 August 2017, Arena announced on her Instagram account that she had completed the recording of her next French-language album, and that 2018 would mark her return to musical theatre as the titular character in the Sydney Opera House production of Evita.

The first teaser for the song appeared on social networks on 30 October 2017 with the caption "Bientôt" (Soon).

== Music video ==
The music video for the song was directed by French director Julien Bloch and released on 17 November 2017. It mixes footage of Arena performing in a studio setting between ceiling-high white veil curtains with images of human bonding, happy or sad, which portray love, family ties, enduring friendship, physical effort, and human support through illness or disability. Such images are also shown on the curtains and the walls surrounding the singer.

== Charts ==
Chart (2017)	Peak position
France (SNEP)	141
