= Live: The Onstage Collection =

Live album by Tina Arena
- Released: 15 January 2010
- Recorded: 28 March 2009
- Venue: Melbourne Arts Centre
- Genre: R&B; soul
- Label: Liberation

Tina Arena chronology
The Peel Me Sessions 2003 (2009)	Live: The Onstage Collection (2010)	Symphony of Life (2012)

Live: The Onstage Collection is the third live album released by the Australian singer and songwriter Tina Arena on 15 January 2010. The album was recorded at the Arts Centre Melbourne during her 2009 Love & Loss Tour and features two duets with her fellow Australian singer Kane Alexander.

== Promotion ==
On 5 May 2010, Arena appeared on Hey Hey it's Saturday and performed "Only Women Bleed". She also made a special live appearance on 7 May 2010 on Sunrise and performed "Wasn't It Good". On Sunday morning, 9 May 2010, she appeared in a Today on Sunday Mother's Day special. On 17 May 2010, Arena was on the panel of Good News week hosted by the comedian Paul McDermott and performed "The Look of Love".

== Track listing ==
=== CD ===
1. "The Look of Love" (Burt Bacharach, Hal David)
2. "I Only Want to Be with You" (Mike Hawker, Ivor Raymonde)
3. "Wouldn't It Be Good" (Nik Kershaw)
4. "Only Women Bleed" (Alice Cooper, Dick Wagner)
5. "Je m'appelle Bagdad" (David Gategno, Elodie Hesme)
6. "I Want to Know What Love Is" (Mick Jones)
7. "I Want to Spend My Lifetime Loving You" (Will Jennings, Jim Steinman)
8. "Wasn't It Good/Burn" (Arena, Heather Field, Robert Parde/Arena, Pam Reswick, Steve Werfel)
9. "Maybe This Time" (Fred Ebb, John Kander)
10. "I Just Don't Know What to Do with Myself" (Bacharach, David)
11. "Nights in White Satin" (Justin Hayward)
12. "Chains" (Arena, Reswick, Werfel)
13. "Call Me" (Debbie Harry, Giorgio Moroder)

=== DVD ===
1. "Living a Lifetime Together" (Arena, Francesco De Benedittis, Emanuelle Vidal De-Fonseca, Paul Manners)
2. "Wouldn't It Be Good" (Kershaw)
3. "To Sir with Love" (Don Black, Mark London)
4. "Je m'appelle Bagdad" (Gategno, Hesme)
5. "I Want to Know What Love Is" (Jones)
6. "I Want to Spend My Lifetime Loving You" (Jennings, Steinman)
7. "Wasn't It Good/Burn"(Arena, Field, Parde/Arena, Reswick, Werfel)
8. "Maybe This Time" (Ebb, Kander)
9. "Baby It's You" (Benjamin Knauer, Leslie Knauer)
10. "Chains" (Arena, Reswick, Werfel)
11. "Call Me" (Harry, Moroder)

== Charts ==
Weekly chart performance for Live: The Onstage Collection
Chart (2010)	Peak position
Australian Albums (ARIA)	22
