= The Peel Me Sessions 2003 =

Compilation album by Tina Arena
- Released: 22 May 2009
- Recorded: 2003 in Falcon Valley, Italy
- Genre: R&B; soul
- Producer: Paul Manners

Tina Arena chronology
The Best & le meilleur (2009)	The Peel Me Sessions 2003 (2009)	Live: The Onstage Collection (2010)

The Peel Me Sessions 2003 is the fourth compilation album by Australian singer and songwriter Tina Arena, which was released exclusively through her official website on 22 May 2009. The album contains nine songs recorded during the northern summer of 2003 in Falcon Valley, Italy.

The project was written and recorded but rejected by her label at the time, Sony Australia, and shelved indefinitely with two of the tracks recorded, "Italian Love Song" and "Take Me Apart", instead appearing on her final release with the label Greatest Hits 1994-2004. Her cover of Diana Ross's "Love Hangover" appeared on her 2007 album Songs of Love & Loss.

"Transparency" was co-written by Arena and Andrew De Silva of Australian R&B group CDB and Paul Cecchinelli who is currently a member of singer Vanessa Amorosi's touring band. Arena penned "No Apology" with production team The Matrix.

== Track listing ==
1. "Talk to Me" (Bob Heatlie, KT Tunstall) – 4:10
2. "Your Love Has Never Failed Me Yet" (Terry Britten, Charmain) – 3:56
3. "Peel Me (Like an Orange)" (Tina Arena, Tom Kelly, Billy Steinberg) – 3:51
4. "Transparency" (Arena, Paul Cecchinelli, Andrew De Silva) – 5:07
5. "Drunk on Love" (Arena, Andrew Sutton) – 4:22 (Incorrectly titled 'Drunk With Love' on reverse of the packaging: the real title is on the CD).
6. "Doesn't It Feel Good" (Arena, Pam Reswick, Steve Werfel) – 3:59
7. "No Apology" (Scott Alspach, Arena, Lauren Christy, Graham Edwards) – 4:43
8. "Take Me Apart" (Fiona Kernaghan) – 4:03
9. "(Sweetest) Love Hangover" (Marilyn McLeod, Pam Sawyer) – 4:36 (Incorrectly titled 'Sweetest (Love) Hangover' on actual CD, real title on reverse of packaging.
