= Symphony of Life (album) =

Live album by Tina Arena
- Released: 23 November 2012
- Recorded: 5 August 2012
- Venue: Melbourne Arts Centre
- Genres: R&B; soul
- Length: 90 minutes
- Labels: Ambition Entertainment; EMI

Tina Arena chronology
Live: The Onstage Collection (2010)	Symphony of Life (2012)	Reset (2013)

Symphony of Life is the fourth live album released by Australian singer and songwriter Tina Arena on 23 November 2012. The album was filmed and recorded at the Arts Centre Melbourne's Hamer Hall during a series of sold-out concerts for her Australian fans. A DVD of this audio album was also released on the same date with the same cover artwork. Anthony Callea stepped in as special guest for the concert series.

== Promotion ==
The live record and the DVD was heavily promoted on Arena's official website, Facebook and various online media outlets. Before the record was released, a TV special titled 'Tina Arena: Live in Melbourne' on Foxtel aired at 8:30 PM Saturday 17 November 2012. The same footage from the DVD was shown. Free Tina Arena postcards were given to those who pre-ordered the album prior to the release date.

== Track listing ==
CD disc one
No.	Title	Writer(s)	Length
1.	"Arenature Overture"
2.	"Living a Lifetime Together"	Tina Arena, Francesco De Benedittis, Emanuelle Vidal De-Fonseca, Paul Manners
3.	"Oh Me Oh My"	Jim Doris
4.	"The Man with the Child in His Eyes"	Kate Bush
5.	"I Just Don't Know What to Do with Myself"	David Bacharach
6.	"My Husband Makes Movies"	Karen Akers
7.	"Don't Cry for Me Argentina"	Tim Rice
8.	"The Prayer" (with Anthony Callea)	David Foster, Carole Bayer Sager, Alberto Testa, Tony Renis
9.	"I Want to Spend My Lifetime Loving You" (with Anthony Callea)	James Horner

CD disc two
No.	Title	Writer(s)	Length
1.	"Wasn't It Good"	Tina Arena, Heather Field, Robert Parde
2.	"Burn"	Arena, Pam Reswick, Steve Werfel)
3.	"Sorrento Moon (I Remember)"	Arena, David Tyson, Christopher Ward
4.	"You Made Me Find Myself"	Arena, Desmond Child, Ty Lacy
5.	"Je m'appelle Bagdad"	David Gategno, Elodie Hesme
6.	"Only Women Bleed"	Alice Cooper, Dick Wagner
7.	"GoldenEye"	Bono, The Edge
8.	"Maybe This Time"	Ebb, Kander
9.	"Symphony of Life"	Arena, Peter-John Vettese
10.	"Cry Me a River"	Arthur Hamilton
11.	"Chains"	Arena, Pam Reswick, Steve Werfel
12.	"Both Sides Now"	Joni Mitchell
13.	"Call Me"	Debbie Harry, Giorgio Moroder

DVD
No.	Title	Writer(s)	Length
1.	"Arenature Overture"
2.	"Living a Lifetime Together"	Tina Arena, Francesco De Benedittis, Emanuelle Vidal De-Fonseca, Paul Manners
3.	"Oh Me Oh My"	Jim Doris
4.	"The Man with the Child in His Eyes"	Kate Bush
5.	"I Just Don't Know What to Do with Myself"	David Bacharach
6.	"My Husband Makes Movies"	Karen Akers
7.	"Don't Cry for Me Argentina"	Tim Rice
8.	"The Prayer" (with Anthony Callea)	David Foster, Carole Bayer Sager, Alberto Testa, Tony Renis
9.	"I Want to Spend My Lifetime Loving You" (with Anthony Callea)	James Horner
10.	"Wasn't It Good"	Arena, Heather Field, Robert Parde
11.	"Burn"	Arena, Pam Reswick, Steve Werfel)
12.	"Sorrento Moon (I Remember)"	Arena, David Tyson, Christopher Ward
13.	"You Made Me Find Myself"	Arena, Desmond Child, Ty Lacy
14.	"Je m'appelle Bagdad"	David Gategno, Elodie Hesme
15.	"Only Women Bleed"	Alice Cooper, Dick Wagner
16.	"GoldenEye"	Bono, The Edge
17.	"Maybe This Time"	Ebb, Kander
18.	"Symphony of Life"	Arena, Peter-John Vettese
19.	"Cry Me a River"	Arthur Hamilton
20.	"Chains"	Arena, Pam Reswick, Steve Werfel
21.	"Both Sides Now"	Joni Mitchell
22.	"Call Me"	Debbie Harry, Giorgio Moroder

== Charts ==
CD

Weekly chart performance for Symphony of Life
Chart (2012)	Peak position
Australian Albums (ARIA)	60

DVD

Weekly chart performance for Symphony of Life DVD
Chart (2012)	Peak position
Australian Music DVDs (ARIA)	4
