= Songs of Love & Loss 2 =

Studio album by Tina Arena
- Released: 15 November 2008
- Recorded: July and September 2008
- Studios: Metropolis Studios, AIR Lyndhurst Hall and Angel Recording Studios, London, Falcon Valley Studios, Italy, and Stella Studio, Kent, England
- Genres: R&B; soul; blues
- Length: 51:48
- Label: EMI Music Australia
- Producers: Duck Blackwell; Paul Guardiani; Greg Fitzgerald; Paul Manners

Tina Arena chronology
| 7 vies (2008) | Songs of Love & Loss 2 (2008) | The Best & le meilleur (2009) |

Singles from Songs of Love & Loss 2
- 1. "Oh Me Oh My" Released: 8 November 2008

Professional ratings
Review scores
| Source | Rating |
|---|---|
| Allmusic | 3/5 stars |

Songs of Love & Loss 2 is the ninth studio album by Australian singer-songwriter Tina Arena, released on 15 November 2008 by EMI in Australia. Her second cover album, it follows on from Songs of Love & Loss, released in 2007, and includes covers of songs by Blondie, Lulu, Alice Cooper and Split Enz among others. The first single, "Oh Me Oh My", was released to Australian radio on 22 October 2008 and made available for download on 8 November. The album was certified gold by the Australian Recording Industry Association for sales in excess of thirty-five thousand just three days after its release and debuted at No. 12 on the ARIA Albums Chart. A limited edition was released featuring a bonus DVD with a 10-minute documentary on the making of the album. The documentary was also available as a video download with pre-orders of the album from the iTunes Store. The digital release also contained a bonus track, a cover of Petula Clark's 1964 hit "Downtown".

== History ==
Arena has stated she chose songs which she loved and held meaning for her. It was her manager Bruce Pawsey's idea for her to record Blondie's "Call Me" and she covered "Every Breath You Take" on the suggestion of her partner Vincent. Considered too 'safe' by Arena, "Your Song" was almost not included and an attempt at U2's "With or Without You" was completely scrapped. Producer Greg Fitzgerald had the idea of reworking Nik Kershaw's "Wouldn't It Be Good" and the sole original composition "Living a Lifetime Together" was written in 2003 by Arena, Paul Manners, Francesco De Benedittis and Emanuelle Vidal De Fonseca. Changes in staff at label EMI Australia left Arena unsure of her future and she revealed this stress contributed to two miscarriages she suffered during 2008 prior to the album sessions.

Arena recorded her vocals live with the London Studio Orchestra, conducted by Simon Hale, for seven of the album's songs at AIR Lyndhurst Hall in London during July 2008. Four more songs, including a cover of Joni Mitchell's "Both Sides Now", were recorded with Hale and the orchestra at Angel Recording Studios in September after Arena returned from her Australian tour with Andrea Bocelli.

== Track listing ==
1. "Oh Me Oh My" (Jim Doris) – 3:13
2. "Only Women Bleed" (Alice Cooper, Dick Wagner) – 5:20
3. "Every Breath You Take" (Sting) – 3:53
4. "Close to You" (Burt Bacharach, Hal David) – 4:59
5. "Call Me" (Debbie Harry, Giorgio Moroder) – 3:46
6. "Baby It's You" (Benjamin Knauer, Leslie Knauer) – 3:40
7. "Nights in White Satin" (Justin Hayward) – 5:01
8. "I Hope I Never" (Tim Finn) – 5:30
9. "Both Sides Now" (Joni Mitchell) – 5:14
10. "Wouldn't It Be Good" (Nik Kershaw) – 3:52
11. "Your Song" (Elton John, Bernie Taupin) – 4:07
12. "Living a Lifetime Together" (Tina Arena, Francesco De Benedittis, Emanuelle Vidal De-Fonseca, Paul Manners) – 3:18

=== Digital ===
1. "Oh Me Oh My" (Doris) – 3:13
2. "Only Women Bleed" (Cooper, Wagner) – 5:20
3. "Every Breath You Take" (Sting) – 3:53
4. "Close to You" (Bacharach, David) – 4:59
5. "Call Me" (Harry, Moroder) – 3:46
6. "Downtown" (Tony Hatch) – 3:49
7. "Nights in White Satin" (Hayward) – 5:01
8. "I Hope I Never" (Finn) – 5:30
9. "Both Sides Now" (Mitchell) – 5:14
10. "Your Song" (John, Taupin) – 4:07
11. "Baby It's You" (Knauer, Knauer) – 3:40
12. "Wouldn't It Be Good" (Kershaw) – 3:52
13. "Living a Lifetime Together" (Arena, De Benedittis, De-Fonseca, Manners) – 3:18

== Personnel ==
- Tina Arena – lead vocals, backing vocals, executive producer
- Mat Bartram – engineer
- Mark 'Duck' Blackwell – producer, backing vocals, guitars, bass, piano, keyboards, percussion, programming
- Marli Buck – backing vocals
- Pip Eastop – French horn
- Andy Findon – flute, alto saxophone, duduk
- Greg Fitzgerald – producer, backing vocals, guitars, bass, piano, keyboards, percussion, programming ("Both Sides Now", "Wouldn't It Be Good")
- Paul Guardiani – producer, programming
- Simon Hale – arranging, conducting
- Skaila Kanga – harp
- Chris Laurence – bass
- Paul Manners – producer, backing vocals, guitars, bass, piano, keyboards, percussion, programming ("Close to You", "Living a Lifetime Together")
- Mark Nightingale – tenor trombone
- Tony Pleeth – cello
- Derek Watkins – trumpet, flugelhorn

== Charts ==
=== Weekly charts ===
Weekly chart performance for Songs of Love & Loss 2
| Chart (2008–2009) | Peak position |
|---|---|
| Australian Albums (ARIA) | 12 |

=== Year-end charts ===
Year-end chart performance for Songs of Love & Loss 2
| Chart (2008) | Position |
|---|---|
| Australian Albums (ARIA) | 79 |

== Certifications ==
| Region | Certification | Certified units/sales |
|---|---|---|
| Australia (ARIA) | Gold | 35,000^{^} |
^{^} Shipments figures based on certification alone.
