= Paul Manners =

British singer

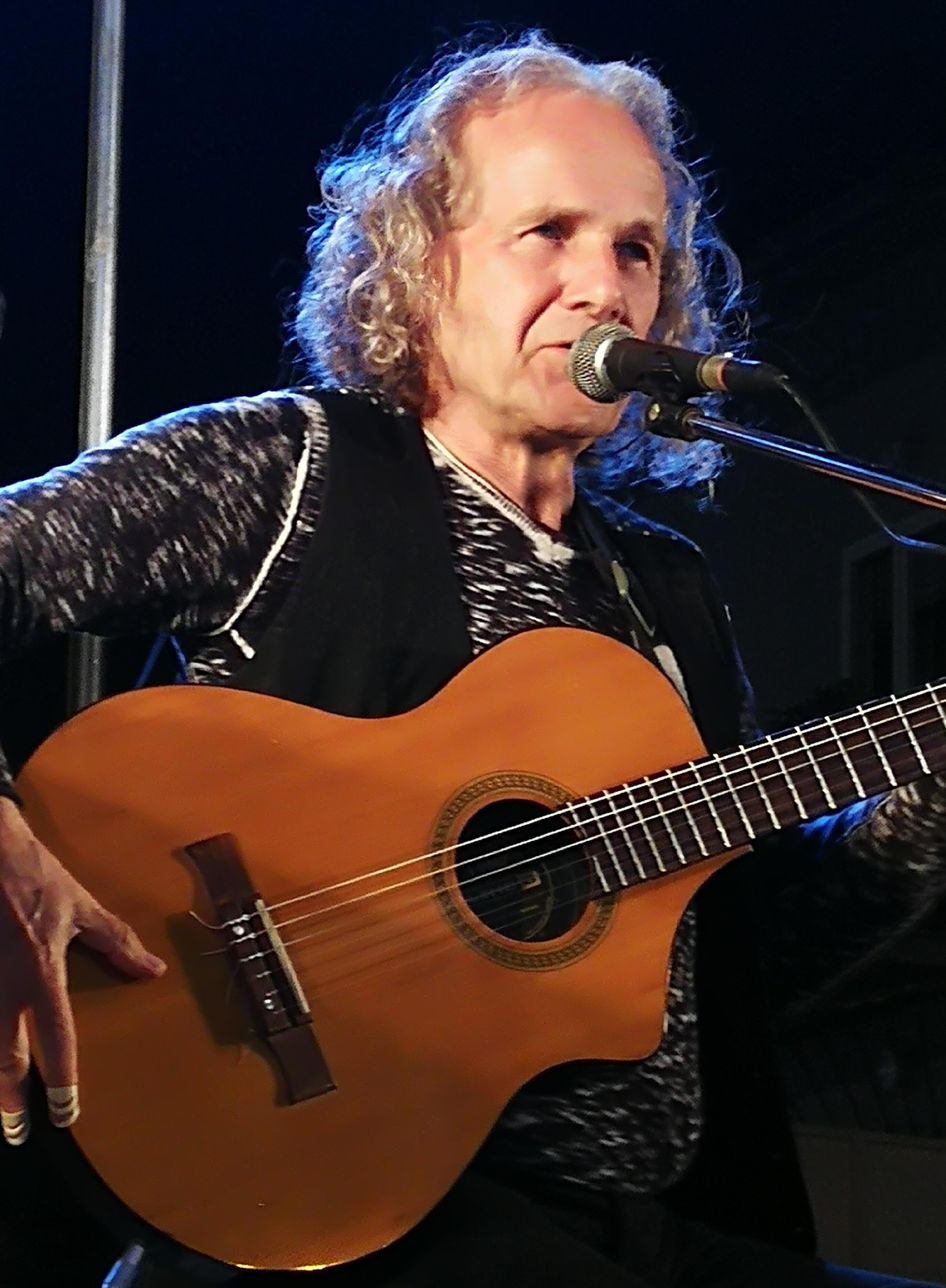
- On stage in 2019

Background information
- Also known as: Paul G. Manners
- Born: Paul Gordon Manners; 27 September 1953 (age 73); London, United Kingdom
- Genres: Pop, rock, dance
- Occupations: Singer, musician, composer, producer, publisher
- Instruments: Guitar, bass, keyboards, drums
- Years active: 1978–present
- Website: pgmanners.com

Paul Manners (born 27 September 1953) is a British singer, musician, composer and producer best known for being the vocalist of the Italian pop band I Cugini di Campagna from 1978 to 1986. He is the founder and leader of Grammar School, a rock band based in Italy since 1986 and has produced many international stars including, Tina Arena, Sylvie Vartan and Kelly Joyce.

== Biography ==
Born in Romford, outskirts of London, he started learning guitar at the age of 13 and played in various local rock bands. He left school at 19 and decided to tour Europe as a busker. After visiting France, Germany, Belgium, Sweden and Denmark he travelled through Italy, where he decided to settle and where he currently lives. He frequented the Conservatorio Domenico Cimarosa in Avellino where he studied music and classical guitar under the guidance of Maestro Edoardo Caliendo. In 1975 he formed a prog rock band called "Aspettando Edmondo" and in 1978 joined a previously famous Italian pop group called I Cugini di Campagna. He recorded 7 successful singles and 3 albums with them, the second of which "Metallo", became the best selling one in the band's history. In 1984 he recorded his first single as a solo artist "Enchanté" published by Baby Records (Italy) with whom he continued to collaborate playing keyboards with the label's internationally successful band Pink Project during their 1985 live tour. In 1986, he announced his resignation from Cugini di Campagna and went on to found his own band, "Grammar School," with Enzo Bocciero—initially as a musical duo.

In 1988 he opened his first professional recording studio "Byte Studios" in Riccione where he studied computer programming and sequencing and where he engineered and produced many international dance hits during that period. He participated in Pavarotti & Friends 1995 with a song called "Clap Clap" he had co-written and recorded. In 1997 he built his second studio called "Falcon Valley" in Montefiore Conca where he works today. Here he began producing, publishing and composing for many international artists such as Tina Arena and Sylvie Vartan for whom he was artistic director of the worldwide 2004 tour and producer of the subsequent live CD album and DVD "Palais des Congrès 2004". He has co-written hits for French artists such as Florent Pagny, Elodie Frégé, and Grégory Lemarchal. In 2008 he recorded his first solo album entitled "3/4", a collection of ballads written entirely in 3/4 time and played on classical guitar. In 2022, he recorded two limited-edition vinyl albums, "Moon Moods" and "Vetro". Today he continues to tour with the band he founded in 1986 ("Grammar School"), and with his solo act in which he presents the multimedia operas he has created in recent years. Furthermore, in 2025, he founded a new band, "The Paul Manners Experience," with Luca Giavon, Andrea Cirocco, and Max Fontana.

== Selected discography ==
=== As a singer/musician ===
Singles with I Cugini di Campagna

- 1978 – Dentro l'anima/Halloo cousins!
- 1979 – Solo con te/Mister Paul
- 1979 – Meravigliosamente/Festa
- 1980 – No tu no/Metallo
- 1981 – Valeria/Floridia
- 1981 – Uomo mio/Elastico
- 1982 – Cucciolo/Volando
- 1985 – Che cavolo d'amore

Albums with I Cugini di Campagna

- 1980 – Meravigliosamente
- 1980 – Metallo
- 1982 – Gomma

Solo singles

- 1984 – Enchanté

Solo albums

- 2008 – 3/4
- 2022 – Moon Moods
- 2022 – Vetro

Albums with Grammar School

- 2010 – Grammar School Vol.1
- 2015 – Grammar School Volume 2

=== As producer ===
- 1994 – Epopea, "People of the night"
- 2000 – Kelly Joyce, . it:Vivre la vie
- 2001 – Tina Arena, Just Me
- 2003 – Tina Arena, The Peel Me Sessions 2003
- 2004 – Tina Arena, Italian Love Song
- 2004 – Sylvie Vartan, Sylvie
- 2004 – Sylvie Vartan, Palais des Congrès 2004
- 2007 – Tina Arena, Songs of Love & Loss
- 2008 – Tina Arena, Songs of Love & Loss 2
- 2014 – Red Canzian, L'istinto e le stelle

=== As a songwriter ===
- 2004 – Elodie Frégé & Michal. Viens jusqu'à moi
- 2005 – Florent Pagny. The day we made God cry
- 2005 – Grégory Lemarchal. Ecris l'histoire

=== His multimedia operas ===
- 2010 – A soldier they called Tom (https://www.youtube.com/watch?v=jbiozeB8p94&t=1s)
- 2014 – La lezione italiana (https://www.youtube.com/watch?v=fPYFvJKNNQs)
- 2020 – Il Complesso (https://www.youtube.com/watch?v=6OWnc3Pqmy8&t=2s)
