= Tu es toujours là =

Single by Tina Arena

from the album Just Me
- Released: 22 February 2002
- Recorded: 2001
- Genre: Pop
- Length: 4:10
- Label: Columbia
- Songwriter: Jacques Veneruso
- Producer: Jacques Veneruso

Tina Arena singles chronology
"Dare You to Be Happy" (2002)	"Tu es toujours là" (2002)	"Symphony of Life" (2002)

"Tu es toujours là" (English: "You're Always There") is a 2002 song recorded by Australian singer Tina Arena. It was the third single from the album Just Me and was released in February 2002. It was also Arena's third single in French. The song achieved moderate success in France, peaking at number 11 and being certified silver by the SNEP.

The song was also included on Arena's Greatest Hits 1994–2004 album and The Best & le meilleur. A live version is available on Vous êtes toujours là.

== Track listing ==
=== CD maxi single ===
1. "Tu es toujours là" – 4:10
2. "I Hope" – 4:27
3. "Soul Mate #9" – 3:25

== Charts ==
Chart (2002)	Peak position
Belgian (Wallonia) Singles Chart	15
European Hot 100 Singles	31
French Singles Chart	11

=== Year-end charts ===
Chart (2002)	Position
Belgian (Wallonia) Singles Chart	75
French Singles Chart	77

=== Certifications ===
Region	Certification	Certified units/sales
France (SNEP)	Gold	250,000^{*}
^{*} Sales figures based on certification alone.
