= Vous êtes toujours là =

Live album by Tina Arena
- Released: April 2003
- Recorded: 2002 at the Paris Olympia
- Genre: Pop
- Label: Columbia

Tina Arena chronology
Just Me (2001)	Vous êtes toujours là (2003)	Greatest Hits 1994–2004 (2004)

Vous êtes toujours là is the first live album by Australian singer Tina Arena released in 2003 primarily in French-speaking Europe. It includes the studio duet with Jay, "Je te retrouve un peu" which was the only single released from the album in France. The bonus track "Never (Past Tense)" was released internationally and reached number one on the US Billboard Dance Airplay chart.

The title of the album is an extrapolation on the title of single "Tu es toujours là", featured on the French version of previous album Just Me. The latter means "You're always there" in the singular and is aimed at a loved one, while the former has the same meaning in the plural, implying the singer addresses a group of people, in this case her fans, thanking them for their support.

The 13 live tracks featured on the record were recorded at Paris' L'Olympia concert hall, however they do not appear on the album in the order they were performed on stage. This is the second album to feature songs interpreted by Tina Arena at the Olympia, following the 2000 release Souvenirs, which contained three renditions recorded at the venue.

French-Canadian singer Roch Voisine joined Tina Arena on stage to perform "I Want to Spend My Lifetime Loving You", originally a duet with Marc Anthony. "Les Trois Cloches" was sung in Franglais, with the second verse performed in English, contrary to the album version and the single edit, which are entirely in French.

== Track listing ==
1. "Je te retrouve un peu" Duet with Jay (Jacques Veneruso) – 3:58
2. "Si je ne t'aimais pas" (David Gategno, Marie-Jo Zarb) – 3:51
3. "Sorrento Moon (I Remember)" (Tina Arena, David Tyson, Christopher Ward) – 4:55
4. "Aller plus haut" (J. Kapler) – 5:46
5. "Les Trois Cloches" (Jean Villard) – 4:42
6. "Burn" (Arena, Pam Reswick, Steve Werfel) – 5:00
7. "Tu es toujours là" (Veneruso) – 4:42
8. "Symphonie de l'âme" (Arena, Peter-John Vettese, Veneruso) – 5:06
9. "I Want to Spend My Lifetime Loving You" Duet with Roch Voisine (James Horner, Will Jennings) – 4:44
10. "I Want to Know What Love Is" (Mick Jones) – 5:51
11. "Chains" (Arena, Reswick, Werfel) – 7:28
12. "Woman" (Arena, Trina Harmon, Tyler Hayes) – 4:57
13. "You Made Me Find Myself" (Arena, Desmond Child, Ty Lacy) – 3:59
14. "Coeur de pierre" (David Hallyday, Eric Chemouny) – 5:28
15. "Never (Past Tense)" The Roc Project featuring Tina Arena (Ray Roc Checo, Aida Lorenzo-Checo, Pamela Lewis, Sam Onervas, Petra Hallberg, Max Reich) – 3:44 (bonus track)
  - Samples: Fused – "Twisted" (Onervas, Hallberg, Reich)

== Charts ==
The album peaked at number 31 in France.

Chart (2003)	Peak position
French Albums Chart	31

== Je te retrouve un peu ==
"Je te retrouve un peu" was released as a single in France April 2003.

"Je te retrouve un peu"

Single by Tina Arena and Jay

from the album Vous êtes toujours là
- Released: 28 April 2003 (France)
- Recorded: 2001
- Genre: Pop
- Length: 3:56
- Label: Columbia
- Songwriter(s): Jacques Veneruso
- Producer(s): Christophe Battaglia, Jacques Veneruso

Tina Arena and Jay singles chronology
"Symphony of Life" (2002)	"Je te retrouve un peu" (2003)	"Never (Past Tense)" (2003)

=== Track listing ===
The CD single includes three tracks.

1. "Je te retrouve un peu" (Version album) – 3:56
2. "Je te retrouve un peu" (Version acoustique) – 3:56
3. "Je te retrouve un peu" (Version karaoké / instrumentale) – 3:56

=== Credits ===
- Gerry Liccardo – bass
- Jacques Veneruso – backing vocals, direction, guitar
- Thierry Blanchard – string arrangement and direction
- Hervé Koster – drums
- Cyril Tarquiny – backing vocals, guitar
- Christophe Battaglia – direction, keyboards, mixing, programming
- Thierry Blanchard – recording
- James SK Wān - Mellotron
- Hervé Cavelier – strings
- Jean Philippe Audin – strings
- Marc Olivier Denatte – strings
- Nathalie Carlucci – strings

=== Charts ===
Chart (2003)	Peak position
French Singles Chart	44
