= Raam Daan =

Band from Senegal

Raam Daan is a mbalax band from Senegal. Founded in 1974 by Thione Seck, Raam Daan has risen to become one of the most popular mbalax bands in Senegal (rivaled only by Youssou N’Dour & his Super Etoile de Dakar band).

The name “Raam Daan” means, “to achieve your goal” in the Wolof language.

Seck characterizes Raam Daan’s mbalax as “pure and powerful.” Raam Daan’s instrumentation includes 3 keyboards, guitar, bass guitar, drum set, & sabar drums.
