= Quand tout Recommence =

Studio album by Tina Arena
- Released: 6 April 2018
- Recorded: 2017
- Studio: De La Grande Armée, La Perruche; Paris, France
- Genre: Pop
- Length: 37:12
- Language: French
- Label: Play Two
- Producer: Valentin Marceau; Fred Savio

Tina Arena chronology
Greatest Hits & Interpretations (2017)	Quand tout Recommence (2018)	Love Saves (2023)

Singles from Quand tout Recommence
- 1. "Tant que tu es là" Released: 17 November 2017; 2. "L'ombre de ma voix" Released: 16 February 2018

Quand tout Recommence is the third French and twelfth overall studio album by Australian singer and songwriter Tina Arena, which was released on 6 April 2018, in France.

The album title, Quand tout Recommence translates to mean When Everything Restarts in English. Arena has stated that when she records in the French language, she is careful not to record French versions of her English language hits, as the meaning of the lyrics differ between languages. Arena notes that too often the intention of the song gets "lost in translation", therefore she has always chosen to write in both languages.

== Track listing ==
No.	Title	Writer(s)	Length
1.	"Regarde"	Frédéric Volovitch	3:00
2.	"La Riviera"	Delta; François Welgryn	3:59
3.	"L'ombre de ma voix"	Keren Rose; Régis Ceccarelli	3:30
4.	"Toi blessé"	Antoine Elie	3:44
5.	"I Was Here"	Pierre-Dominique Burgaud; Alain Lanty	2:56
6.	"Las Vegas"	Welgryn; William Rousseau	3:35
7.	"Tant que tu es là"	Alexandra Maquet; Mark Weld	3:33
8.	"Les balles à blanc"	Pierre Riess; Lanty	2:55
9.	"Quand tout Recommence"	Caruso; Alexandra Maquet; Mark Hekic	3:32
10.	"L'empire des lumières"	Delta; Welgryn	3:11
11.	"Parfait"	Delta; Welgryn	3:17
Total length:			37:12

== Charts ==
Chart (2018)	Peak position
Belgian Albums (Ultratop Wallonia)	46
French Albums (SNEP)	62

== Release history ==
Region	Date	Label	Catalogue
France	6 April 2018	Play Two	0190295667221
