= Thione Seck =

Senegalese singer (1955–2021)

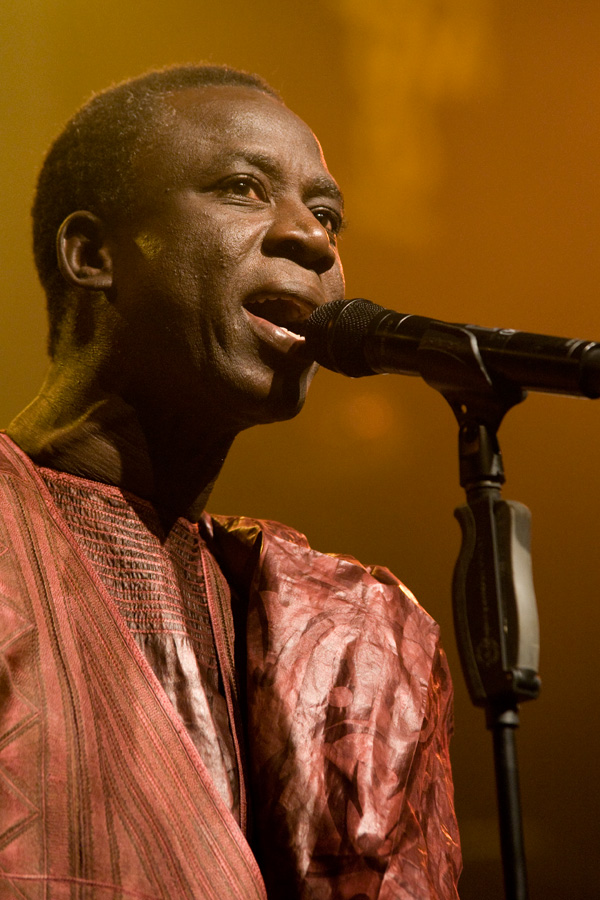
- Seck performing in 2011

Background information
- Birth name: Thione Seck
- Born: March 12, 1955; Dakar, Senegal
- Died: March 14, 2021 (aged 66); Dakar, Senegal
- Genres: Mbalax
- Instrument: Vocals
- Years active: 1970–2021

Thione Ballago Seck (March 12, 1955 – March 14, 2021) was a Senegalese singer and songwriter in the mbalakh genre. Seck came from a family of griot singers from the Wolof people of Senegal. He first performed with Orchestre Baobab, but he later formed his own band, Raam Daan, of which he was a member until his death in 2021.

== Early life ==
Seck was born in Dakar on March 12, 1955. He was of Wolof descent and was raised Muslim. He first joined Orchestra Baobab in the 1970s. After a decade of performing with the group, he established Raam Daan.

== Career ==
Seck's album Orientation was one of four nominated for BBC Radio 3's World Music Album of the Year in 2006. In much of his music, and notably on this album, Seck experiments with the use of Indian & Arabic scales. This supplements his laid back vocals and the band's intense sabar driven rhythms, and displaces the band's more usual guitars, horns, and synthesizers. This album was made in collaboration with a range of more than 40 North African, Arab, and Indian musicians, playing diverse instruments and creating a fusion of styles. Seck has stated that Bollywood films were a longstanding musical influence for him, and the experiment in a fusion style reflects this.

Other albums include XV Anniversary Live! (his second international release) and Daaly. Seck contributed "Laye M'Boup," a tribute to the late Orchestre Baobab leader, to The Music in My Head soundtrack. He also wrote "Entends-tu le monde?" which was the lead single from Australian singer Tina Arena's seventh studio album 7 vies.

Seck was arrested in May 2015, after €50 million in counterfeit money was discovered in his home. He claimed that he was the "victim of a conspiracy" by Gambians residing in Sweden, who had offered him a €100 million contract for a series of 105 concerts throughout Europe. Seck was later convicted of "attempted scam", "money laundering", "criminal association" and "attempted circulation, possession and reception of falsified monetary signs" on June 22, 2020. He was sentenced on appeal to three years in prison, including eight months in prison (covered by the nine months served upon his initial arrest in 2015).

Seck died on March 14, 2021, from COVID-19, in Dakar, two days after his 66th birthday.

== Discography ==
Albums

- Orientation (2005)
- XV Anniversary Live! (2000)
- Daaly (1996)
- Diaga

Contributing artist

- The Rough Guide to the Music of Senegal (2013, World Music Network)

== See also ==
- Baaba Maal
- Youssou N'dour
