= Songs of Love & Loss =

Studio album by Tina Arena
- Released: 1 December 2007
- Recorded: 2007
- Studios: AIR Lyndhurst Hall and Angel Recording Studios, London, Falcon Valley Studios, Italy
- Genres: R&B; soul; blues
- Length: 49:49; 65:02 (European edition)
- Label: EMI
- Producers: Duck Blackwell; Paul Guardiani; Paul Manners

Tina Arena chronology
Un autre univers (2005)	Songs of Love & Loss (2007)	7 vies (2008)

Alternative covers
- Deluxe edition cover

Singles from Songs of Love & Loss
- 1. "To Sir with Love" Released: 24 November 2007

Professional ratings
Review scores
Source	Rating
The Courier-Mail	4.5/5 stars
The Herald Sun	4/5 stars

Songs of Love & Loss is the seventh studio album, and first cover album, by Australian singer and songwriter Tina Arena, released on 1 December 2007. The album was Arena's first full length English language recording in six years and her first album with EMI since her debut Strong as Steel in 1990. It peaked at No. 3 on the ARIA Top Albums Chart and was certified platinum a week after its release. "Until" was the only original song on the album. A French-language version of "Until" ("Ta vie") was featured on her next album, 7 vies. "Woman" is featured in a remixed version here. The original is from her 2001 Just Me album.

A deluxe edition of the album was released on 19 April 2008 which featured a bonus disc of songs recorded live during Arena's five-date Love & Loss Tour.

Songs of Love & Loss was nominated for Highest Selling Album at the 2008 ARIA Music Awards.

Arena released Songs of Love & Loss in France, Belgium and Switzerland on 18 May 2015 under the title of Love and Loss.

== History ==
Recorded primarily in London in 2007 with the London Studio Orchestra conducted by Simon Hale, the album is made up of ten covers, one new song and a reworking of "Woman" from Arena's previous album, Just Me. The record was originally going to be entirely made up of Dusty Springfield covers but Arena decided this would be too creatively limiting so broadened the scope to include other torch songs which she felt matched the tone of the album. "To Sir with Love" was performed by Arena at a graduation Mass at St. Columba's College, Melbourne on her final day of high school so it held special meaning for her.

Arena financed the record herself as she did not have a recording contract in Australia at the time.

== Promotion ==
On 6 November 2007, Arena appeared on Dancing with the Stars and performed "To Sir with Love" followed by a brief interview with the show's host Daryl Somers. The next morning she sang "The Look of Love" on Sunrise and a day later was interviewed by Kyle & Jackie O on 2Day FM in Sydney. Arena returned to Sunrise on 14 December 2007 to perform "I Just Don't Know What to Do with Myself" and "To Sir with Love" after which she was presented with a plaque recognising platinum sales of the album. She also guest hosted Love Song Dedications on MIX 106.5 in Sydney in place of Richard Mercer on 17 December 2007. Her playlist included 10cc's "I'm Not in Love" and "Why" by Annie Lennox amongst many of her other personal favourites.

Arena performed three concerts at the Sydney Opera House and two at Hamer Hall in Melbourne over the December 2007—January 2008 period. Arena performed with her band as well as a 35 piece orchestra.

== Track listing ==
1. "The Look of Love" (Burt Bacharach, Hal David) – 3:44
2. "I Just Don't Know What to Do with Myself" (Bacharach, David) – 3:44
3. "So Far Away" (Carole King) – 4:13
4. "To Sir with Love" (Don Black, Mark London) – 3:40
5. "The Man with the Child in His Eyes" (Kate Bush) – 4:31
6. "Do You Know Where You're Going To" (Gerald Goffin, Michael Masser) – 3:42
7. "Love Hangover" (Marilyn McLeod, Pam Sawyer) – 4:27
8. "I Only Want to Be with You" (Mike Hawker, Ivor Raymonde) – 4:04
9. "The Windmills of Your Mind" (Alan Bergman, Marilyn Bergman, Michel Legrand) – 3:46
10. "Everybody Hurts" (Bill Berry, Peter Buck, Mike Mills, Michael Stipe) – 5:29
11. "Woman" (Tina Arena, Trina Harmon, Tyler Hayes) – 3:53
12. "Until" (Arena, Duck Blackwell, Paul Guardiani) – 4:40

=== Deluxe edition ===
The deluxe edition featured a bonus disc of songs recorded live on the Love & Loss Tour.

1. "Wasn't It Good" (Arena, Heather Field, Robert Parde) – 5:10
2. "You Made Me Find Myself" (Arena, Desmond Child, Ty Lacy) – 4:57
3. "Les trois cloches (The Three Bells)" (Jean Villard) – 3:57
4. "Now I Can Dance" (Arena, David Tyson) – 4:42
5. "Sorrento Moon" (Arena, Tyson, Christopher Ward) – 5:02

=== European 2015 edition ===
1. "Living a Lifetime Together" (Tina Arena, Francesco De Benedittis, Emanuelle Vidal De-Fonseca, Paul Manners) – 3:18
2. "The Look of Love"
3. "I Only Want to Be with You"
4. "Do You Know Where You're Going To"
5. "Et puis après" (Henri Salvador, Lydia Martinico) - 2:47
6. "The Windmills of Your Mind"
7. "Every Breath You Take" (Sting) – 3:53
8. "The Man with the Child in His Eyes"
9. "Everybody Hurts"
10. "Never Tear Us Apart" (Andrew Farriss, Michael Hutchence) - 2:51
11. "Close to You" (Burt Bacharach, Hal David) – 4:59
12. "Nights in White Satin" (Justin Hayward) – 5:01
13. "So Far Away"
14. "Both Sides Now" (Joni Mitchell) – 5:14
15. "Wouldn't It Be Good" (Nik Kershaw) – 3:52
16. "Je Dis Call Me" (Debbie Harry, Giorgio Moroder) – 3:46

== Personnel ==
- Tina Arena – singer, executive producer
- Duck Blackwell – recording, production, mixing, guitars, bass, keyboards, drums, programming, backing vocals
- Paul Guardiani – recording, production, mixing, keyboards, programming
- Paul Manners – recording, production, mixing, guitars, bass, keyboards, percussion, programming, backing vocals ("Love Hangover")
- Simon Hale – conducting, string arrangements
- London Studio Orchestra
  - Violins – Perry Montague-Mason, Warren Zielinski, Patrick Kiernan, Boguslav Kostecki, Julian Leaper, Emlyn Singleton, Everton Nelson, Chris Tombling, Tom Pigott-Smith, Rita Manning, Peter Hanson
  - Violas – Pete Lale, Bruce White, Andy Parker, Rachel Bolt
  - Celli – Tony Pleeth, Martin Loveday, Dave Daniels, Jo Knight
- Luca Campaner – guitars
- Simon Johnson – guitars
- Andrew Barnes-Jones – guitars
- Lucy Harrison – backing vocals
- Peter Brew-Bevan – photography
- Debaser – art direction

== Charts ==
Love & Loss debuted at No. 31 on the French Albums Chart with 1,700 copies sold.

=== Weekly charts ===
Weekly chart performance for Songs of Love & Loss
Chart (2007–2008)	Peak position
Australian Albums (ARIA)	3
Chart (2015)	Peak position
Belgian Albums (Ultratop Wallonia)	35
French Albums (SNEP)	31

=== Year-end charts ===
Year-end chart performance for Songs of Love & Loss
Chart (2007)	Position
Australian Albums (ARIA)	38

== Certifications ==
Region	Certification	Certified units/sales
Australia (ARIA)	Platinum	70,000^{^}
^{^} Shipments figures based on certification alone.
