= Entends-tu le monde? =

- Digital/Promotional single artwork

Single by Tina Arena

from the album 7 vies
- B-side: "Ailleurs"
- Released: 15 November 2007
- Recorded: 2007
- Genre: French pop, dance-pop
- Length: 3:58
- Label: Columbia
- Songwriters: Thione Seck, Audrey Siourd
- Producer: Un Chat

Tina Arena singles chronology
"Tu aurais dû me dire (Oser parler d'amour)" (2006)	"Entends-tu le monde?" (2007)	"To Sir with Love" (2007)

Alternate cover
- CD single artwork

"Entends-tu le monde?" is the first single released from 7 vies, the second French-language album by Australian singer Tina Arena. The title roughly translates into English as "Do you hear the world?". The music video for the song was directed by Fabien Dulfils in and around Sydney in December and premiered in early January. The song received a physical release as a CD single in France on 11 February 2008.

== Song information ==
The track has a similar musical style to that found on Arena's previous album Un autre univers with its Senegalese choir and Persian guitars. These eastern influences were particularly prominent on the singles "Je m'appelle Bagdad" and "Aimer jusqu'à l'impossible". Lyrically, the song presents a message of hope for the future.

Senegalese singer Thione Seck originally composed the song and the French lyrics were written by Audrey Siourd. The track was produced by Un Chat who is also known as DJ Molecule.

== Track listing ==
1. "Entends-tu le monde?" (radio edit) (Seck) – 3:33
2. "Ailleurs" (Tina Arena, Paul Begaud, Vanessa Corish) – 3:57

== Release history ==
Region	Date	Label	Format	Catalog
France	17 November 2007	Columbia	Paid download	–
France	11 February 2008	Columbia	CD single	88697253672

== Charts ==
Chart (2008)	Peak position
Belgian (Wallonia) Singles Chart	32
European Hot 100 Singles	31
French Singles Chart	10
French Digital Singles Chart	27
