= Don't Ask =

Studio album by Tina Arena
- Released: 14 November 1994
- Recorded: 1994
- Genres: Pop; pop rock
- Length: 45:28
- Label: Columbia
- Producer: David Tyson

Tina Arena chronology
Strong as Steel (1990)	Don't Ask (1994)	In Deep (1997)

Alternative cover
- 1996 release artwork

Singles from Don't Ask
- 1. "Chains" Released: 29 August 1994; 2. "Sorrento Moon (I Remember)" Released: 16 January 1995; 3. "Heaven Help My Heart" Released: 22 May 1995; 4. "Wasn't It Good" Released: 18 September 1995; 5. "Show Me Heaven" Released: 20 November 1995; 6. "That's the Way a Woman Feels" Released: 26 February 1996

Professional ratings
Review scores
Source	Rating
AllMusic	2/5 stars
Billboard	(favorable)
Music & Media	(favorable)
Smash Hits	4/5 stars

Don't Ask is the third studio album by Australian singer Tina Arena released by Columbia Records on 14 November 1994.

== Overview ==
Arena co-wrote all of the songs on the original release of the album which was produced by David Tyson. The album spawned six successful singles "Chains", "Sorrento Moon (I Remember)", "Heaven Help My Heart", "Wasn't It Good", "That's the Way a Woman Feels" and the cover version of Maria McKee's song "Show Me Heaven" which was recorded for the international version and was released as a single in the United Kingdom.

The album hit #1 in Australia, remaining on the Aria Top 50 album charts for 83 weeks. It was certified 10 times Platinum and is one of best selling albums of all time in Australia.

Don't Ask and its singles earned Arena ten ARIA Awards nominations throughout 1995 and 1996, winning five, including Album of the Year. It is the first album by a female artist to do so.

== Reception ==
Billboard noted that the album "features the kind of mix of uptempo tunes and ballads that are certain to play on top 40, AC, and R&B outlets. Lead single "Chains" has made some noise and other equally hit-worthy tunes could do the same, especially perky numbers "Love Is The Answer" and "Heaven Help My Heart" funky "Standing Up" and "Message," and the ballad "ShowMe Heaven." Singer's success in her native country and Europe is a prelude to U.S. breakthrough."

Music & Media stated that "Chains" was "a good introduction to her warm vocals, but surely isn't representative of the whole set. Throughout she changes colours like a chameleon. If required she modifies her voice to Astrud Gilberto-ish swing for the Latin-flavoured "Sorrento Moon(I Remember)". To send the shivers down the spines of the general public, she can also induce a Celine Dion sentiment for the ballad "Wasn't It Good".

In a mixed review, AllMusic "it's perhaps easy to expect too much after the stellar debut single "Chains." That's not to say Arena's debut offers nothing to the listener; it could have been far worse...Even so, a lot of Don't Ask remains twee. However, there are good moments in the shape of showcase single "Chains," power ballad "Heaven Help My Heart" and the bouncy closing track "Standing Up." There's room for improvement then, although Arena can deliver some fine vocals, and David Tyson supplies some equally fine production. The gorgeous "Sorrento Moon" suggests Arena may yet become the Astrud Gilberto of Australia."

== Track listing ==
Australian version
No.	Title	Writer(s)	Length
1.	"Chains"	Tina Arena, Pam Reswick, Steve Werfel	4:22
2.	"Heaven Help My Heart"	Arena, Dean McTaggart, David Tyson	5:28
3.	"Sorrento Moon (I Remember)"	Arena, Tyson, Christopher Ward	4:54
4.	"Wasn't It Good"	Arena, Heather Field, Robert Parde	5:14
5.	"Message"	Arena, April Lang, Annie Roboff, Tyson	5:22
6.	"Love Is the Answer"	Arena, Rick Price	3:56
7.	"Greatest Gift"	Arena, Parde	4:23
8.	"That's the Way a Woman Feels"	Arena, Reswick, Werfel	4:21
9.	"Be a Man"	Arena, Reswick, Werfel	3:51
10.	"Standing Up"	Arena, Field, Price	3:35

Japanese edition
No.	Title	Writer(s)	Length
12.	"Show Me Heaven"	Maria McKee, Eric Rackin, Jay Rifkin	4:20

International version
No.	Title	Writer(s)	Length
1.	"Chains"	Tina Arena, Pam Reswick, Steve Werfel	4:22
2.	"Heaven Help My Heart"	Arena, Dean McTaggart, David Tyson	5:28
3.	"Sorrento Moon (I Remember)"	Arena, Tyson, Christopher Ward	4:54
4.	"Wasn't It Good"	Arena, Heather Field, Robert Parde	5:14
5.	"Message"	Arena, April Lang, Annie Roboff, Tyson	5:22
6.	"Show Me Heaven"	McKee, Rackin, Rifkin	4:20
7.	"Love Is the Answer"	Arena, Rick Price	3:56
8.	"Greatest Gift"	Arena, Parde	4:23
9.	"That's the Way a Woman Feels"	Arena, Reswick, Werfel	4:21
10.	"Be a Man"	Arena, Reswick, Werfel	3:51
11.	"Standing Up"	Arena, Field, Price	3:35

European version
No.	Title	Writer(s)	Length
12.	"Chains" (S&M radio edit)	Tina Arena, Pam Reswick, Steve Werfel	4:07

== Personnel ==
- Tina Arena − vocals, background vocals
- Peter Asher − percussion
- Erika Duke-Kirkpatrick − cello
- Claude Gaudette − piano
- Raven Kane − background vocals
- Peter Kent − violin
- Kirkpatrick − cello
- Matt Lang − percussion
- Bob Mann − guitar
- Marilyn Martin − background vocals
- Pat Mastelotto − percussion, drums
- Robert Parde − background vocals
- John Pierce − bass guitar
- Tim Pierce − acoustic guitar, guitar
- Rick Price − acoustic guitar, background vocals
- David Tyson − keyboard, Hammond organ, background vocals
- Carlos Vega − drums
- The Waters Family − background vocals
- Jai Winding − piano, keyboard

=== Production ===
- Producers: Peter Asher, Chris O'Brien, David Tyson
- Engineers: Greg Droman, George Massenburg, Frank Wolf
- Mixing: Chris Lord-Alge
- Mixing assistant: Steve Gallagher
- Mastering: Doug Sax
- Production coordination: Tony DeFranco
- Programming: Chris O'Brien, Dave Tyson
- Arrangers: Tina Arena, David Campbell, Robert Parde, David Tyson

== Charts ==
Don't Ask became Arena's highest selling album to date selling in excess of 2 million copies worldwide and was certified ten times platinum by the ARIA.

=== Weekly charts ===
Chart (1994–96)	Peak position
Australian Albums (ARIA)	1
German Albums (Offizielle Top 100)	65
New Zealand Albums (RMNZ)	12
Scottish Albums (Official Charts)	34
Swedish Albums (Sverigetopplistan)	49
Swiss Albums (Schweizer Hitparade)	32
UK Albums (Official Charts)	11
US Billboard 200	101
European Albums (Eurotipsheet)	71

=== Year-end charts ===
Chart (1994)	Position
Australian Albums (ARIA)	100
Chart (1995)	Position
Australian Albums (ARIA)	1
Chart (1996)	Position
Australian Albums (ARIA)	19
New Zealand Albums (RMNZ)	29

== Certifications and sales ==
Region	Certification	Certified units/sales
Australia (ARIA)	10× Platinum	700,000^{^}
New Zealand (RMNZ)	Platinum	15,000^{^}
United Kingdom (BPI)	Gold	100,000^{*}
United States	—	130,000
^{*} Sales figures based on certification alone.^{^} Shipments figures based on certification alone.

== Release history ==
Region	Date	Label	Format	Catalog
Australia	14 November 1994	Columbia Records	CD	4778862
United Kingdom	8 May 1995	Columbia	CD	
Australia	24 November 2017	Sony Music	Vinyl	88985342401

== See also ==
- List of best-selling albums in Australia
