= 7 vies =

Studio album by Tina Arena
- Released: 28 January 2008
- Recorded: July–December 2007 in London and Paris
- Genre: Pop; dance-pop; R&B; pop rock
- Length: 51:31
- Language: French
- Label: Columbia
- Producer: Duck Blackwell; Un Chat; Greg Fitzgerald; David Gategno; Paul Guardiani; Rémi Lacroix; Peter-John Vettese

Tina Arena chronology
| Songs of Love & Loss (2007) | 7 vies (2008) | Songs of Love & Loss 2 (2008) |

Singles from 7 vies
- 1. "Entends-tu le monde?" Released: 15 November 2007; 2. "L'un pour l'autre" Released: March 2008

7 vies is the eighth studio album by Australian singer and songwriter Tina Arena, released on 28 January 2008 on Columbia Records in France. The title translates into English as "7 Lives" and the first single from the album "Entends-tu le monde?" was released digitally on 15 November 2007 and physically on 11 February 2008. This Arena's second French language album.

Track 12 is a duet between Arena and Jean-François Bernardini from Corsican folk music group I Muvrini and track 7, "Ta Vie", is a French-language version of "Until" which appeared on her previous English album Songs of Love & Loss.

7 vies is Arena's second album to be recorded entirely in French and debuted on the French Album Chart at No. 12, her highest debut on the chart to date.

On 14 February 2008, the second single was confirmed to be "L'un pour l'autre".

== Track listing ==
| # | Title | Length | Composer(s) | Lyricist(s) | Producer(s) |
|---|---|---|---|---|---|
| 1 | "Entends-tu le monde?" | 3:58 | Thione Seck | Audrey Siourd | Un Chat |
| 2 | "Tu pourras dire" | 4:20 | Patrick Fiori, Noam Kaniel, Marie-Jo Zarb | | Rémi Lacroix |
| 3 | "7 vies" | 3:45 | Tina Arena, David Gategno | Elodie Hesme | Gategno |
| 4 | "Danser la vie" | 3:55 | Lacroix | Philippe Latger | Lacroix |
| 5 | "Ombres chinoises" | 4:22 | Arena, Lacroix | Arena, Hesme | Lacroix |
| 6 | "L'un pour l'autre" | 3:23 | Gategno | Hesme | Gategno |
| 7 | "Ta vie" | 4:28 | Arena, Duck Blackwell, Paul Guardiani | | Blackwell, Guardiani |
| 8 | "S'il m'est donné" | 4:35 | Arena, Fiori | Vincent Hare | Lacroix |
| 9 | "Hollywood boulevard" | 4:22 | Arena, Gil Gemenez | Hare | Blackwell, Guardiani |
| 10 | "Je vois ta lumière" | 4:09 | Arena, Kevin Malpas | | Blackwell, Guardiani |
| 11 | "Ailleurs" | 3:54 | Arena, Paul Begaud, Vanessa Corish | | Greg Fitzgerald |
| 12 | "Dis-moi" | 3:30 | Arena, Jean-François Bernardini, Peter-John Vettese | Arena, Bernardini | Vettese |
| 13 | "N'oublie pas" | 4:38 | Anse Lazio | Moria Nemo | Blackwell, Guardiani |

== Charts ==
=== Weekly charts ===
| Chart (2008) | Peak position |
|---|---|
| Belgian (Wallonia) Albums Chart | 16 |
| European Top 100 Albums | 75 |
| French Albums Chart | 12 |
| Swiss Albums Chart | 56 |

=== Year-end charts ===
| Chart (2008) | Position |
|---|---|
| Belgian (Wallonia) Albums Chart | 95 |
| French Albums Chart | 177 |

== Release history ==
| Region | Date | Label | Catalogue |
|---|---|---|---|
| Belgium | 28 January 2008 | Columbia Records | 88697222702 |
| France | 28 January 2008 | Columbia Records | 88697222702 |
| Switzerland | 28 January 2008 | Columbia Records | 88697222702 |
| Canada | 3 June 2008 | | |
