= Never (Past Tense) =

Single by The Roc Project feat. Tina Arena

from the album Vous êtes toujours là
- Released: April 22, 2003
- Genre: Electronic
- Length: 3:47
- Label: Tommy Boy
- Songwriters: Reich, M./Malm, S./Lewis, P./Hallberg, P./Checo, R./Lorenzo, A.

Tina Arena singles chronology
"Je te retrouve un peu" (2003)	"Never (Past Tense)" (2003)	"Italian Love Song" (2004)

"Never (Past Tense)" is a song by American electronic music group the Roc Project, released in 2003. The original recording features the group's lead vocalist Tina Novak, but due to Ray Roc and Novak being signed to different record labels, Australian vocalist Tina Arena was recruited to re-record the vocals for the single release. Later, with record label issues cleared up, Novak appeared as the vocalist on all tracks of the Roc Project's first album, released in early 2003, but the album also included the version of "Never (Past Tense)" with Arena's vocals. This version also appeared on Arena's album Vous êtes toujours là.

The single is the only recording for Tina Arena and the Roc Project. It reached the top 5 of the U.S. Billboard Dance/Club Play chart and was the second number-one single on the Hot Dance Airplay on October 4, 2003 (at a time when this chart was unpublished). It reached No. 42 in the UK Singles Chart in April 2003. This single was Tina Arena's second and last time appearing on the Billboard Hot 100 chart, peaking at No. 97, after "Chains (Tina Arena song)" in 1994.

== Track listing ==
=== CD single ===
1. "Never (Past Tense)" (Radio Edit) - 3:47
2. "Never (Past Tense)" (Breaks Radio Edit) - 4:08
3. "Never (Past Tense)" (Original Extended Mix) - 9:04
4. "Never (Past Tense)" (Johnny Budz Break) - 6:46
5. "Never (Past Tense)" (Filterheadz Luv Tina Remix) - 8:08
6. "Never (Past Tense)" (Max Reich Remix) - 8:55
7. "Never (Past Tense)" (Chillout Mix) (David Anthony) - 6:03
8. "Never (Past Tense)" (DJ Tiësto Remix) - 7:48

== Charts ==
Chart (2003)	Peak Position
Netherlands (Single Top 100)	100
Scotland Singles (Official Charts)	36
UK Singles (Official Charts)	42
UK Dance (Official Charts)	7
US Billboard Hot 100	97
US Hot Dance/Club Play (Billboard)	4
US Dance Airplay (Billboard)	1
