= Dare You to Be Happy =

2002 single by Tina Arena

Single by Tina Arena

from the album Just Me
- B-side: "I Hope"
- Released: 21 January 2002
- Length: 4:14
- Label: Columbia
- Songwriters: Tina Arena; Peter John Vettese
- Producer: Nile Rodgers

Tina Arena singles chronology
| "Soul Mate #9" (2001) | "Dare You to Be Happy" (2002) | "Tu es toujours là" (2002) |

"Dare You to Be Happy" is a song by Australian singer Tina Arena. It was recorded for her fourth studio album, Just Me (2001), and was released as the second single on 21 January 2002. The single was a moderate success, peaking at number 43 in Australia. "Dare You to Be Happy" received high rotation on Channel [V] in early 2002. A remixed version was later included on Arena's greatest hits album Greatest Hits 1994–2004.

== Music video ==
The video was released in January 2002 and sees Arena at a house party, playing air hockey, before leaving in a car with some friends to a games parlour.

== Track listing ==
The single was released with four versions of "Dare You to Be Happy" and the non-album track "I Hope".

Australian maxi-CD single

1. "Dare You to Be Happy" – 4:14
2. "Dare You to Be Happy" (James Ash radio edit) – 4:10
3. "Dare You to Be Happy" (Sgt Slick's "North Face" radio edit mix) – 3:51
4. "Dare You to Be Happy" (Big Club vocal) – 6:10
5. "I Hope" – 4:27

== Charts ==
| Chart (2002) | Peak position |
|---|---|
| Australia (ARIA) | 43 |
