= Simon Hale =

British composer

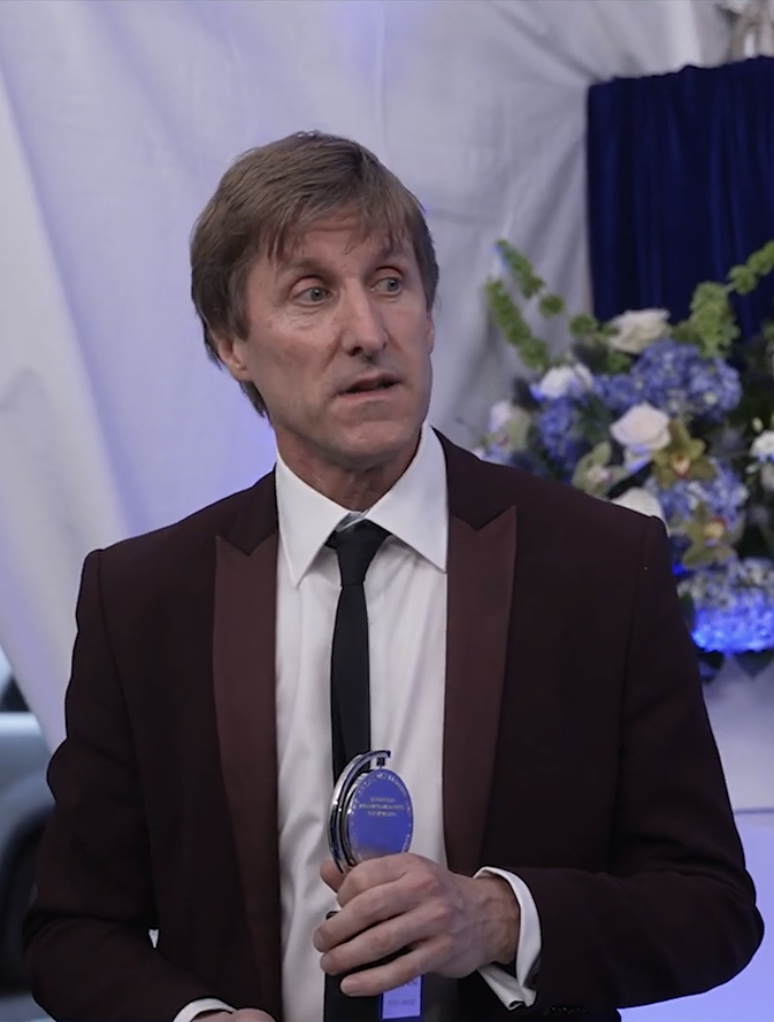
- Hale at the 75th Tony Awards in 2022

Background information
- Born: 1964 (age 61–62)
- Origin: Birmingham, England
- Genres: Orchestral, alternative rock, jazz
- Occupations: Composer, musician
- Instruments: Piano, keyboards
- Years active: 1985–present
- Website: www.simonhale.co.uk

Simon Hale is a British composer, arranger, and keyboardist.

== Life ==
Hale was born in Birmingham, England in 1964, being dually raised there and in South Manchester before moving to London, where he studied popular music at Goldsmiths College, University of London from 1982 to 1985. He is married to Claire Moore. His father is Tony Hale, formerly Head of Music and Programming at Capital Radio.

== Work ==
He is best known for his arrangements on CDs for Jamiroquai, Björk, BT, Duncan Sheik, Madness, Incognito, Supergrass, The Beautiful South, George Benson, Tony Banks, Josh Groban, Charlotte Church, Becky Taylor and Robin Gibb. As well as arranging on Duncan Sheik's solo CDs, Simon has also done orchestrations on Duncan's songs for the film "A Home at the End of the World" and the Broadway musical Spring Awakening, which won 8 Tony Awards in June 2007, including "Best Orchestrations" by Duncan and Simon. The original cast recording won the Grammy Award for Best Musical Show Album in 2008. He has released one solo CD, East Fifteen, written for piano, trumpet/flugelhorn, tenor saxophone, percussion and strings. He appeared with The Bays at their performance as part of the Fresh Festival in Liverpool's Philharmonic Hall in January 2008. The concert was entirely improvised, including all the orchestral parts, written live on stage by Simon and John Metcalfe. In 2009, he orchestrated Songs of Love & Loss, the seventh studio album and first cover album, by Australian singer and songwriter Tina Arena. He orchestrated the Lincoln Center Theater production of the new musical Women on the Verge of a Nervous Breakdown, that opened on 4 November 2010 at the Belasco Theatre on Broadway. This production was nominated for a Drama Desk Award for Outstanding Orchestrations in May 2011. He orchestrated and wrote choir arrangements for Ray Davies' performance at the Royal Festival Hall as part of the Meltdown Festival in June 2011. He co-wrote (with Andrew Hale) the soundtrack of L.A. Noire as well as playing solo piano, orchestrating and conducting the recordings. The score won a BAFTA for Original Music. He orchestrated a new production of Stephen Sondheim's Company at Sheffield Theatres at the end of 2011. He orchestrated Finding Neverland at the American Repertory Theater in Boston in the summer of 2014 and again for the Broadway production on 2015. He received a Grammy nomination in 2015 for his contribution to the Sam Smith album In the Lonely Hour and also arranged and orchestrated Writing's on the Wall, the theme song for the James Bond film Spectre. He worked in string arrangements of Japanese-American superstar Hikaru Utada albums Fantôme and Hatsukoi. In 2019 Hale was nominated in the Best Orchestrations category for his work on the musical Tootsie at 73rd Tony Awards.

== Solo releases ==
1994: East Fifteen (EFZ Records)
