= Show Me Heaven =

1990 single by Maria McKee

Single by Maria McKee

from the album Days of Thunder Soundtrack
- B-side: "Car Building" by Hans Zimmer; "Thunder Box" by Apollo Smile
- Released: June 1990
- Genre: Soft rock
- Length: 3:46
- Label: Epic
- Songwriters: Maria McKee; Eric Rackin; Jay Rifkin
- Producer: Peter Asher

Maria McKee singles chronology
"To Miss Someone" (1989)	"Show Me Heaven" (1990)	"Breathe" (1991)

"Show Me Heaven" is a song written by American singer and songwriter Maria McKee, Eric Rackin and Jay Rifkin, and recorded by McKee for the soundtrack to the Tom Cruise film Days of Thunder, released in June 1990 by Epic Records. Produced by Peter Asher, the power ballad received favorable reviews from most music critics, who praised McKee's performance and vocal range.

The song reached number one on the UK Singles Chart for four weeks and became the sixth-highest-selling single of 1990 in the UK. Additionally, the song became a worldwide hit, topping the charts of Belgium, Luxembourg, the Netherlands, and Norway and becoming a top-five hit in Australia, Ireland, Sweden, and Switzerland. It has since been covered by numerous other artists, including Tina Arena in 1995.

== Background ==
"Show Me Heaven" originated as "Secret Fire", a track written by Eric Rackin and Jay Rifkin for the soundtrack of Days of Thunder. When Geffen contacted McKee in the hope she would record the song, the singer dismissed the idea, but the label insisted they send her the demo tape for consideration. On hearing the demo, McKee felt the lyrics were "appalling". She told Simon Mayo in 1991: "I liked the melody but I said I'd only do it if I could change the lyrics." McKee's demand was initially refused, but she was later given permission to rewrite the lyrics.

== Critical reception ==
Scottish Aberdeen Press and Journal described the song as "more heaven" from the former Lone Justice singer, complimenting her vocals as "superbly lazy, yet faultless". Jeffery Kennedy from Bay Area Reporter felt it was a "blatant Hollywood hyperballad that perfectly showcased her gilded throat". Larry Flick from Billboard magazine named it a "delicate, well-sung ballad that could give the long-overlooked McKee her first bonafide hit." A reviewer from Cash Box viewed the singer as the "lost goddess of the pop airwaves", remarking her "heartachingly lovely jewel of a voice [that] can squeeze diamonds out of the coal-black grooves of a record." Greg Sandow from Entertainment Weekly called the song "affecting". Tom Ewing of Freaky Trigger declared it as a "post-Madonna power ballad", adding that McKee "can belt, but she's most comfortable away from the chorus, giving 'Show Me Heaven' a more tender and dynamic performance." Dave Sholin from the Gavin Report constated that "there aren't many singers on the planet who can outdo Maria's remarkable vocal range. It was her voice that first endeared me to her band Lone Justice. Now as a soloist, she puts all that special ability to the test on the heart-stopping love theme from the Tom Cruise film, Days of Thunder. A couple of listens won me over."

David Giles from Music Week felt that McKee's "powerful voice endows a fairly ordinary MOR soft rock song with a certain piquancy that lifts it well above the average soundtrack song." Gene Sandbloom from The Network Forty praised the singer's "tremendous voice and stage presence", naming the song "one of the most memorable ballads of the year." He added, "Before you even get to the chorus, you know this is the kind of heart warming song that can't miss bringing in across the board demos come weekly music research time. If you missed the film, don't worry. If you didn't like McKee's past work, forget it. This is one of those magic moments when everything falls perfectly into place, and you'll realize it with one listen." Stuart Bailie from NME named it "Single of the Week", viewing it as "a deal more sophisticated" than her debut as a solo artist the year before. Another NME editor, Mark Ramshaw, described it as "floaty". John Wirt from The News-Journal complimented it as a "stunning love song with bite." Sunday Tribune's reviewer praised it as a "Californian voice of an angel".

== Chart performance ==
"Show Me Heaven" spent four weeks at number one on the UK Singles Chart, ending the year as the country's sixth-highest-selling single, and is McKee's only UK number-one as a performer (although the song "A Good Heart"—written by her—was a UK number one for Feargal Sharkey in November 1985). The power ballad had even greater success in Norway, topping the Norwegian Singles Chart for 10 weeks. The track was also a number-one success in Belgium, Luxembourg and the Netherlands.

"Show Me Heaven" failed to enter the US Billboard Hot 100 but did reach number 28 on the Billboard Adult Contemporary chart. In Canada, "Show Me Heaven" reached number 69 on the RPM 100 Hit Tracks chart and number 30 on the RPM 40AC (Adult Contemporary) chart. Elsewhere, the single reached number two in Ireland and Sweden, number three in Australia, number four in Switzerland, and the top 20 in Austria, Germany and New Zealand.

== Track listings ==
7-inch single, UK (1990)
No.	Title	Length
1.	"Show Me Heaven"	3:54
2.	"Car Building" (by Hans Zimmer)	2:36

12-inch and cassette single, UK (1990)
No.	Title	Length
1.	"Show Me Heaven"	3:54
2.	"Thunder Box" (by Apollo Smile)	3:46
3.	"Car Building" (by Hans Zimmer)	2:26

CD single, UK (1990)
No.	Title	Length
1.	"Show Me Heaven"	3:54
2.	"Thunder Box" (by Apollo Smile)	3:46
3.	"Car Building" (by Hans Zimmer)	2:36

CD single, Australia (1990)
No.	Title	Length
1.	"Show Me Heaven"	3:54
2.	"Thunder Box" (by Apollo Smile)	3:46

CD maxi (mini), Europe (1990)
No.	Title	Length
1.	"Show Me Heaven"	3:46
2.	"Car Building" (by Hans Zimmer)	2:35
3.	"Hearts in Trouble" (by Chicago—radio edit)	4:00

== Charts ==
=== Weekly charts ===
Chart (1990–1991)	Peak position
Australia (ARIA)	3
Austria (Ö3 Austria Top 40)	15
Belgium (Ultratop 50 Flanders)	1
Canada Top Singles (RPM)	69
Canada Adult Contemporary (RPM)	30
Denmark (IFPI)	9
Europe (Eurochart Hot 100)	2
Finland (Suomen virallinen lista)	22
Germany (GfK)	12
Iceland (Dagblaðið Vísir)	2
Ireland (IRMA)	2
Israel (Israeli Singles Chart)	4
Luxembourg (Radio Luxembourg)	1
Netherlands (Dutch Top 40)	1
Netherlands (Single Top 100)	1
New Zealand (Recorded Music NZ)	12
Norway (VG-lista)	1
Portugal (AFP)	8
Sweden (Sverigetopplistan)	2
Switzerland (Schweizer Hitparade)	4
UK Singles (Official Charts)	1
UK Airplay (Music Week)	15
US Adult Contemporary (Billboard)	28

=== Year-end charts ===
Chart (1990)	Position
Australia (ARIA)	67
Belgium (Ultratop)	42
Europe (Eurochart Hot 100)	46
Israel (Israeli Singles Chart)	12
Netherlands (Dutch Top 40)	16
Netherlands (Single Top 100)	23
Sweden (Topplistan)	12
UK Singles (OCC)	6

Chart (1991)	Position
Australia (ARIA)	55
Europe (Eurochart Hot 100)	53
Germany (Media Control)	97
Sweden (Topplistan)	45
Switzerland (Schweizer Hitparade)	24

== Certifications ==
Region	Certification	Certified units/sales
Australia (ARIA)	Platinum	70,000^{^}
United Kingdom (BPI)	Gold	400,000^{‡}
^{^} Shipments figures based on certification alone.^{‡} Sales+streaming figures based on certification alone.

== Tina Arena version ==
"Show Me Heaven"

Single by Tina Arena

from the album Don't Ask
- B-side: "Message"; "Greatest Gift"; "Chains"
- Released: November 20, 1995
- Length: 4:20 (album version); 3:32 (single version)
- Label: Columbia; Epic
- Songwriters: Maria McKee; Eric Rackin; Jay Rifkin
- Producer: Peter Asher

Tina Arena singles chronology
"Wasn't It Good" (1995)	"Show Me Heaven" (1995)	"Burn" (1997)

Music video
- "Show Me Heaven" on YouTube

Australian singer-songwriter Tina Arena released her version of "Show Me Heaven" as the fifth single from her third studio album, Don't Ask (1994), on November 20, 1995, by Columbia and Epic Records. Although it was not released in her home country, her version of the song reached number 29 in the United Kingdom, number 33 in New Zealand and number 78 in Germany. It also peaked at number three on the US Billboard Bubbling Under Hot 100 and number 52 on the Canadian RPM Adult Contemporary chart. The song was produced by Peter Asher, who had also produced the original by Maria McKee in 1990.

=== Critical reception ===
Larry Flick from Billboard magazine named Arena's version of "Show Me Heaven" "a stirring rendition". He stated that "Arena has the voice and attitude to match the bombast of McKee's performance, but she wisely opts for a slow and stylish ascension to the song's requisite thunderclap climax. Actually, Arena sounds like a baby Celine Dion throughout much of this fine single—which is not necessarily a bad thing." Daina Darzin from Cash Box said it "suggests Arena is more like Australia’s answer to Mariah Carey. Her lush, gently crescendoing take on Maria McKee’s 1990 hit should impact Adult Contemporary stations like that giant spaceship in the previews of Independence Day." James Masterton for Dotmusic felt that Arena's version "stays fairly faithful to the original, the powerful song suiting her voice quite well. Having said that it fails to add much to the song, a good though it is, the track is unlikely to emulate the feats of the original." Pan-European magazine Music & Media described it as "soulful", noting that it "has a Whitney Houston style intro, but very soon Miss Arena makes it clear that her own voice is much warmer, a fact emphasised by the gospel harmonies of the background singers."

=== Charts ===
Chart (1995–1996)	Peak position
Canada Adult Contemporary (RPM)	52
Europe (Eurochart Hot 100)	87
Europe (European Hit Radio)	34
Germany (GfK)	78
New Zealand (Recorded Music NZ)	33
Scottish Singles Sales (Official Charts)	29
UK Singles (Official Charts)	29
US Bubbling Under Hot 100 (Billboard)	3

=== Release history ===
Region	Date	Format(s)	Label(s)	Ref.
United Kingdom	November 20, 1995	CD; cassette	Columbia	
United States	June 25, 1996	Contemporary hit radio	Epic	

== Other cover versions ==
- In 1993, Cheap Trick lead singer Robin Zander released a version of the song on his self-titled debut solo album. Zander's version was issued as a single and features McKee on backing vocals.
- Laura Branigan recorded the song and featured it as one of two new tracks on her 1995 greatest hits album, The Best of Branigan.
- A dance version of "Show Me Heaven" by Chimira peaked at number 70 on the UK Singles Chart in 1997.
- Another dance version of the song, by Saint (featuring Suzanna Dee), peaked at number 36 in 2003.
- In 2017, Ane Brun released a version of the song on her all-covers album, Leave Me Breathless.
