= Italian Love Song =

Single by Tina Arena

from the album Greatest Hits 1994-2004
- Released: 5 November 2004 (Australia)
- Recorded: April 2004 at Falcon Valley, Italy
- Genre: Pop
- Length: 3:51
- Label: Columbia
- Songwriter(s): Tina Arena, Francesco De Benedittis, Davide Esposito, Paul Manners
- Producer(s): Paul Manners

Tina Arena singles chronology
"Never (Past Tense)" (2003)	"Italian Love Song" (2004)	"Aimer jusqu'à l'impossible" (2005)

"Italian Love Song" is a pop song written by Tina Arena, Francesco De Benedittis, Davide Esposito and Paul Manners, produced by Manners for Arena's sixth album Greatest Hits 1994-2004 (2004). The song was released as a single in Australia on 5 November 2004 but failed to make a major impact on the Australian ARIA Singles Chart peaking at number thirty-three and spending two weeks in the top fifty.

Included on the single is "Take Me Apart" which is the only other new track featured on her greatest hits album and a previously unreleased remix of "Dare You to Be Happy", a single from her album Just Me (2001). The song also features a music video clip shot by Australian director Anthony Rose in a small fishing village in Southern France.

== Writing ==
In the inside cover of her 2004 greatest hits album, Arena states:

Italians are a breed unto themselves: humorous, passionate and wildly romantic. This song was written in the hills of Emilia Romagna region, the land of Fellini, in May 2004. It was written in the springtime by Italians with a beautiful sense of melody and metaphor... need I say more.

== Track listing ==
1. "Italian Love Song" – 3:51
2. "Take Me Apart" (Fiona Kernaghan) – 4:02
3. "Dare You to Be Happy" (remix) (Arena, Peter-John Vettese) – 4:34

== Charts ==
Chart (2004)	Peak position
ARIA Singles Chart	33
ARIA Australian Artist Chart	8
