= Soul Mate No. 9 =

"Soul Mate #9"

Single by Tina Arena

from the album Just Me
- B-side: "It's Tonight"
- Released: 28 September 2001
- Recorded: 2001
- Genre: R&B; dance-pop
- Length: 3:26
- Label: Columbia
- Songwriters: Peter Amato; Tina Arena; Desmond Child

Tina Arena singles chronology
"The Flame" (2000)	"Soul Mate #9" (2001)	"Dare You to Be Happy" (2002)

"Soul Mate #9" is a song by Australian singer Tina Arena. It was recorded for her fourth studio album Just Me and was released as its lead single in September 2001. The single was only a moderate success, peaking just outside the top 20 in Australia. It also charted at number 77 in Switzerland.

It was later included on Arena's greatest hits album Greatest Hits 1994–2004.

== Track listing ==
=== CD single ===
1. "Soul Mate #9" – 3:26
2. "Soul Mate #9" (Nathan G Volume Radio Edit) – 3:18
3. "Soul Mate #9" (Big Boyz Remix) – 4:04
4. "It's Tonight" – 4:19

== Charts and certifications ==
Chart (2001)	Peak position	Certification
Australia (ARIA)	22	Gold
Switzerland (Schweizer Hitparade)	77	
