= Just Me (Tina Arena album) =

Studio album by Tina Arena
- Released: 12 November 2001
- Studios: Dublin, London, Los Angeles, New York City, Paris
- Genres: Pop; electropop; disco
- Length: 43:59
- Label: Columbia
- Producers: Lukas Burton; Erik Godal; Paul Manners; Nile Rodgers; Peter-John Vettese

Tina Arena chronology
Souvenirs (2000)	Just Me (2001)	Vous êtes toujours là (2003)

Singles from Just Me
- 1. "Soul Mate #9" Released: 28 September 2001; 2. "Dare You to Be Happy" Released: 21 January 2002; 3. "Tu es toujours là" Released: 22 February 2002; 4. "Symphony of Life" Released: 16 September 2002

Professional ratings
Review scores
Source	Rating
UKMix	link

Just Me is the fifth studio album by Australian singer Tina Arena, released in Australia on 12 November 2001 by Columbia Records. Arena co-wrote tracks on the album with Desmond Child, Robbie Neville, Mark Hudson, Victoria Shaw and Peter-John Vettese. Debuting in the Australian ARIA Albums Chart top ten, Just Me was Arena's third top-ten album but the album was considered a commercial failure. Two singles taken from the album; "Soul Mate #9" and "Dare You to Be Happy" were not major hits, while the third single "Symphony of Life" became Arena's fifth top-ten hit.

== Writing and content ==
The album was written mainly in Europe and the United States. Arena worked with different collaborators than on her previous albums including Nile Rodgers, Peter-John Vettese, Lukas Burton and Paul Manners, which Arena hoped would strengthen her appeal to both old and new fans. At the time, Arena stated "I set out to make a record that reflected all of the personal, sonic and lyrical growth that I believe I have undergone in recent years. The only master plan, the only objective I set for myself, was to experiment and write the freshest sounding record I could - one that was truly an indication of where I am at in my life right now." She also states "I don't see this album as a continuation of my previous work. I think it is definitely a new beginning - almost a rebirth. That's part of the reason it took a long time to make. I wanted to be sure about what I wanted to say and how I wanted to say it, and I think it was good to gain a little bit of perspective away from a fairly relentless presence in this country."

She also states "People are very curious - which is a really good thing but this is quite a departure, so I hope they like it. Making this record has given me a lot of emotional strength, and has allowed me the opportunity to share some of the things that have played an important part in my personal growth over the past few years. I have laid it all out there for the world to see - and I guess to judge. However overall, it's a very positive and intimate record and I think people will identify with it."

She said, of working with producers/songwriters Rodgers and Vettese; "I have to wait until I get into the studio with the producers for the sounds to really happen. That's when all the magic starts. Nile and Peter were such encouraging producers to work with and they were able to come up with exactly what I was after. I was very excited to be working with Nile, given his incredible pedigree and Peter has to be one of the funniest and most talented men on the planet. It was important to be surrounded by positive people; but at the same time, I didn't want to be around anyone who was hiding anything from me. I think that we achieved the perfect balance." The album also explores a new electronic sound for Arena, which is evident on "Soul Mate #9", "Symphony of Life" and "Woman". She stated "It was fun to bop again, to move again. Bringing all those infectious beats into the mix - the ones that you can't help but dance to - was really important."

== Chart performance ==
The album debuted on the Australian ARIA Albums Chart on 19 November 2001 at number seven and was certified gold by ARIA. The album fell out of the top twenty in its second week and spent only four weeks in the top fifty and twelve weeks in the top one hundred. In France, despite debuting and peaking at number forty-seven, the album spent a total of forty-four weeks in the top one hundred and fifty and was eventually certified gold by the SNEP. The album was less successful in Switzerland, where it debuted at number seventy-four and peaked at number sixty-seven spending just three weeks in the top one hundred.

== Track listing ==
No.	Title	Writer(s)	Length
1.	"Dare You to Be Happy"	Tina Arena, Peter-John Vettese	4:13
2.	"Soul Mate #9"	Arena, Peter Amato, Desmond Child	3:25
3.	"But I Lied"	Arena, Craig Bartock, Amy Powers	3:35
4.	"God Only Knows"	Arena, Jeremy Mathot, Remi Lacroix & Angela Lupino	4:11
5.	"Symphony of Life"	Arena, Vettese	4:45
6.	"You Made Me Find Myself"	Arena, Child, Ty Lacy	3:52
7.	"If You Ever"	Arena, Ben Robbins, Pam Sheyne	4:48
8.	"Tangled"	Arena, Randy Cantor, Robbie Neville	4:29
9.	"I'm Gone"	Arena, Mark Hudson, Victoria Shaw	3:29
10.	"Something's Gotta Change"	Arena, Russ DeSalvo, Arnie Roman	3:30
11.	"Woman"	Arena, Trina Harmon, Tyler Hayes	3:42

French bonus tracks
No.	Title	Writer(s)	Length
12.	"Cœur de pierre"	David Hallyday, Eric Chermonny	3:36
13.	"Tu es toujours là"	Jacques Veneruso	4:10
14.	"Si je ne t'aimais pas"	David Gategno, Marie-Jo Zarb	3:25

== Personnel ==
- Tina Arena – vocals
- Richard Bailey – photography
- Ian Dench – guitar
- John Fortis – bass guitar
- Erik Godal – keyboard, programming
- Simon Hale – conductor, string arrangements
- Richard Hilton – keyboard, shaker, electric sitar, programming, mixing, engineer
- Paul Manners – bass, guitar, percussion, vocals, mixing, engineer
- Nile Rodgers – guitar, electric sitar
- Sylver Logan Sharp – background vocals
- Sacha Skarbek – strings, keyboard
- Peter-John Vettese – keyboard, background vocals, programming, string arrangements

== Charts ==
=== Weekly charts ===
Weekly chart performance for Just Me
Chart (2001–2003)	Peak position
Australian Albums (ARIA)	7
French Albums (SNEP)	47
Swiss Albums (Schweizer Hitparade)	67

=== Year-end charts ===
Year-end chart performance for Just Me
Chart (2002)	Position
French Albums (SNEP)	137

== Certifications ==
Certifications for Just Me
Region	Certification	Certified units/sales
Australia (ARIA)	Gold	35,000^{^}
France (SNEP)	Gold	100,000^{*}
^{*} Sales figures based on certification alone.^{^} Shipments figures based on certification alone.

== Release history ==
Release history and formats for Just Me
Country	Date	Label	Format	Catalog
Australia	12 November 2001	Columbia	CD	5046142000
France	16 November 2001	Columbia	CD	—N/a
