= Heaven Help My Heart =

1995 single by Tina Arena

Single by Tina Arena

from the album Don't Ask
- Released: 22 May 1995
- Genre: Pop rock; soft rock
- Length: 5:28 (album version); 4:31 (single edit)
- Label: Columbia
- Songwriters: Tina Arena; David Tyson; Dean McTaggart
- Producer: David Tyson

Tina Arena singles chronology
"Sorrento Moon (I Remember)" (1995)	"Heaven Help My Heart" (1995)	"Wasn't It Good" (1995)

Audio
- "Heaven Help My Heart" on YouTube

"Heaven Help My Heart" is a song originally recorded by Australian singer and songwriter Tina Arena. It was written in 1994 by Arena with David Tyson and Dean McTaggart and released by Columbia Records as the third single from Arena's second album, Don't Ask (1994). The song reached number 22 in her native Australia, and was a top-40 hit in the United Kingdom and New Zealand. Arena performed the single on the British children's television series Fully Booked on 5 August 1995.

== Critical reception ==
Paul Verna from Billboard magazine viewed the song as a "perky number". Pan-European magazine Music & Media wrote, "Arena knows how to chain herself to radio. Bass guitar forms the stable base for a solid piece of FM pop rock. Walking exactly in the middle of the road, she takes the shortest way to your heart." A reviewer from Music Week gave the song a score of four out of five, adding, "Sony's regional radio pluggers will have plenty of takers for this soft rock follow-up to 'Chains', although it doesn't hit quite the same spot."

== Charts ==
Chart (1995)	Peak position
Australia (ARIA)	22
Europe (Eurochart Hot 100)	81
Europe (European Hit Radio)	22
Germany (GfK)	77
Iceland (Íslenski Listinn Topp 40)	35
New Zealand (Recorded Music NZ)	33
Scottish Singles Sales (Official Charts)	21
UK Singles (Official Charts)	25
UK Airplay (Music Week)	8

== Certifications ==
Region	Certification	Certified units/sales
Australia (ARIA)	Gold	35,000^{‡}
^{‡} Sales+streaming figures based on certification alone.

== Release history ==
Region	Date	Format(s)	Label(s)	Ref.
Australia	22 May 1995	CD; cassette	Columbia	
United Kingdom	31 July 1995	CD; cassette	Columbia	
Japan	22 May 1996	CD	Epic	

== Wynonna Judd version ==
"Heaven Help My Heart"

Single by Wynonna Judd

from the album Revelations
- B-side: "Heaven Help My Heart" (album version)
- Released: 1996
- Genre: Country
- Length: 6:08 (album version); 4:48 (single version)
- Label: MCA; Curb
- Songwriters: Tina Arena; David Tyson; Dean McTaggart
- Producer: Tony Brown

Wynonna Judd singles chronology
"To Be Loved by You" (1996)	"Heaven Help My Heart" (1996)	"My Angel Is Here" (1996)

In 1996, American country music singer Wynonna Judd covered the song for her third album, Revelations (1996). Her cover version went to number 14 on the US Hot Country Singles & Tracks chart and number five on the Canadian RPM 100 Country Tracks chart.

=== Charts ===
==== Weekly charts ====
Chart (1996)	Peak position
Canada Country Singles (RPM)	5
US Hot Country Songs (Billboard)	14

==== Year-end charts ====
Chart (1996)	Position
Canada Country Tracks (RPM)	74
