= Roc Project =

The Roc Project is an American electronica act, composed of the New York City-based DJ Ray Roc and, most often, the vocalist Tina Novak. Their debut single, "Never (Past Tense)" was released in 2003. However, because of difficulty getting the song released due to Novak and Roc being signed to different record labels, Ray Roc decided to recruit the Australian singer Tina Arena to sing Novak's vocals instead. Arena's version of "Never (Past Tense)" was therefore the single release. It became a major club and dance radio hit in America, and even managed to peak at No. 97 on the Billboard Hot 100 chart. It also reached No. 42 in the UK Singles Chart in April 2003.

The Roc Project's first album was released in early 2003 and, with the record label issues finally cleared up, Novak appeared as the vocalist on all tracks, although the album also included the version of "Never (Past Tense)" with Arena's vocals. The group's second single, "Deja Vu", was released in the spring of 2004, and became a smaller club and dance hit than their debut single.
