= Wasn't It Good (Tina Arena song) =

1995 single by Tina Arena

Single by Tina Arena

from the album Don't Ask
- Released: 18 September 1995
- Length: 5:14 (album version)
- Label: Columbia
- Songwriters: Tina Arena; Heather Field; Robert Parde
- Producer: David Tyson

Tina Arena singles chronology
"Heaven Help My Heart" (1995)	"Wasn't It Good" (1995)	"Show Me Heaven" (1995)

Music video
- "Wasn't It Good" on YouTube

"Wasn't It Good" (titled "Wasn't It Good..." for the single release) is a song by Australian singer-songwriter Tina Arena from her third studio album, Don't Ask (1994). Arena co-wrote the song along with Heather Field and Robert Parde, and it was produced by David Tyson. Released in September 1995, the song peaked at number 11 in Australia and received four nominations at the ARIA Awards in 1996.

Arena has performed the song on most tours, including her 2004 Greatest Hits tour and 2012 Australian tour. It is track four on her 2004 Greatest Hits compilation.

== Musical and lyrical content ==
"Wasn't It Good" was composed in the key of G, while the lyrics lament a past friendship that did not turn into a romantic relationship.

== Critical reception ==
In their review of Don't Ask, Music & Media wrote, "To send the shivers down the spines of the general public, she can also induce a Celine Dion sentiment for the ballad 'Wasn't It Good'."

== Award nominations ==
=== ARIA Awards ===
The ARIA Awards are presented annually from 1987 by the Australian Recording Industry Association (ARIA). "Wasn't It Good" was nominated in four categories, including Single of the Year. It did not win any awards.

Year	Nominee / work	Award	Result
1996	"Wasn't It Good"	Best Female Artist	Nominated
1996	"Wasn't It Good"	Best Pop Release	Nominated
1996	"Wasn't It Good"	Single of the Year	Nominated
1996	"Wasn't It Good"	Song of the Year	Nominated

=== APRA Awards ===
The Australasian Performing Right Association have presented the APRA Awards annually from 1982; "Wasn't It Good" was nominated in 1996 and won the Song of the Year.

Year	Nominee / work	Award	Result
1996	"Wasn't It Good"	Song of the Year	Won

== Track listing ==
A five-track single was released through Columbia Records; it contains both the single edit and original album version of "Wasn't It Good", as well as live versions of three other tracks from Don't Ask.

Australian CD single

1. "Wasn't It Good" (single version)
2. "Greatest Gift" (live)
3. "Love Is the Answer" (live)
4. "Message" (live)
5. "Wasn't It Good" (album version)

== Charts ==
=== Weekly charts ===
Chart (1995)	Peak position
Australia (ARIA)	11

=== Year-end charts ===
Chart (1995)	Position
Australia (ARIA)	66

== Certifications ==
Region	Certification	Certified units/sales
Australia (ARIA)	Gold	35,000^{^}
^{^} Shipments figures based on certification alone.
