= Symphony of Life =

2002 single by Tina Arena

Single by Tina Arena

from the album Just Me
- Released: 16 September 2002
- Recorded: Late 2001
- Length: 4:45
- Label: Columbia
- Songwriters: Tina Arena; Peter-John Vettese
- Producer: Peter-John Vettese

Tina Arena singles chronology
"Tu es toujours là" (2002)	"Symphony of Life" (2002)	"Je te retrouve un peu" (2003)

Alternative cover
- The cover of the single released in France

"Symphony of Life" is a song written by Tina Arena and Peter-John Vettese, produced by Vettese for Arena's fourth album, Just Me (2001). It was released as the album's third single in Australia on 16 September 2002. The song became Arena's fifth top-10 single in Australia and her sixth top-50 single in France, where the song was recorded in French under the title "Symphonie de l'âme". Arena stated that the song challenged her and that she is proud of the song.

== Content and writing ==
In the inside cover of her 2004 greatest hits album, Arena states:

'Symphonie', as the French say it, was a drastic departure from anything I had recorded before. I was living in Paris and felt liberated by the experience. I think I wanted to challenge myself. I wanted to discover something new. By the end of that recording session in the winter of 2001, co-writer Peter-John Vettese and I felt like we had done just that. I still get a minor kick singing this floaty melody both on stage and in the shower.

== Music video ==
The music video for the song was directed by Yannick Saillet and had a colourful fantasy theme to the 7-inch Metro Mix version of the song. The video opens up to Arena walking on water wearing a brown dress and them comes across two girls in blue dresses dancing in pink flowers. The next scene, the chorus, shows Arena walking and dancing in a desert arena with many other girls dressed in brown. Once the second verse kicks in, Arena is then shown laying on grass with pink flower petals scattered around her and girls dressed in leaves are dancing. The last fantasy scene shows Arena walking and then dancing in an ice land with giant snowballs surrounding her and dancers dressed in white. The rest of the video shows parts of Arena dancing in the different fantasy areas. The music video was well received being played on Australian music channels Video Hits and Rage.

== Track listings ==
Australian CD single

1. "Symphony of Life"
2. "Symphony of Life" (Metro mix 7-inch)
3. "Symphony of Life" (Paulmac's extended Euroremix)
4. "Symphonie de l'âme"

French CD single

1. "Symphonie de l'âme" (radio edit) – 4:03
2. "Symphony of Life" (album version) – 4:45
3. "Symphonie de l'âme" (Metro remix) – 4:12

== Charts ==
Chart (2002)	Peak position
Australia (ARIA)	8
France (SNEP) "Symphonie de l'âme"	48

== Live cover ==
"Symphony of Life" was performed live during season 2 of Australian Idol by eventual winner Casey Donovan on the Final 12 Australian Made theme night. Donovan received massive amounts of praise from the judges for this performance and she reprised the song at the grand finale at the Sydney Opera House where she was crowned the winner of the competition. The live version from the finale was used as a bonus track on Donovan's debut album For You.
