= Sorrento Moon (I Remember) =

1995 single by Tina Arena

Single by Tina Arena

from the album Don't Ask
- B-side: "Greatest Gift" (live); "Many Rivers to Cross" (live)
- Released: 16 January 1995
- Length: 4:54
- Label: Columbia
- Songwriters: Tina Arena; David Tyson; Christopher Ward
- Producer: David Tyson

Tina Arena singles chronology
"Chains" (1994)	"Sorrento Moon (I Remember)" (1995)	"Heaven Help My Heart" (1995)

Music video
- "Sorrento Moon (I Remember)" on YouTube

"Sorrento Moon (I Remember)" is a song written by Australian singer Tina Arena, David Tyson, and Christopher Ward for Arena's second album, Don't Ask (1994). The song is about Arena's childhood memories of summers past with her family at Sorrento in Victoria, Australia. It was produced by Tyson and released as the album's second single in Australia on 16 January 1995 by Columbia Records. The song also reached the top 40 in New Zealand and the United Kingdom. The accompanying music video was partly shot at Sorrento back-beach. The song is lyrically referred to in Client Liaison's 2017 single "A Foreign Affair", featuring Arena.

== Critical reception ==
AllMusic editor Kelvin Hayes complimented the song as "gorgeous", adding that it "suggests Arena may yet become the Astrud Gilberto of Australia." James Richliano from The Boston Globe wrote in his review of the Don't Ask album, "The sweet innocence is most prominent on 'Sorrento Moon (I Remember)', an uptempo gem steeped in breezy calypso rhythms". British newspaper The Guardian described it as "delicate", while a reviewer from People Magazine noted its "samba flavor". Pan-European magazine Music & Media wrote, "If required she modifies her voice to Astrud Gilberto-ish swing for the Latin-flavoured 'Sorrento Moon (I Remember)'." Mark Frith from Smash Hits felt Arena "still has her genius touch for the perfect ballad", as in "the wonderful Calypso summer smash".

== Track listings ==
- Australian CD single
1. "Sorrento Moon (I Remember)"
2. "Greatest Gift" (live)
3. "Many Rivers to Cross" (live)
4. "Sorrento Moon (I Remember)" (radio edit)
- UK CD single
1. "Sorrento Moon (I Remember)" (radio version)
2. "Sorrento Moon (I Remember)" (Spanish version)
3. "That's the Way a Woman Feels" (The New Horns mix)
4. "Wasn't It Good" (live solo version)
- Austrian CD single
1. "Sorrento Moon (I Remember)" (radio version)
2. "Chains" (Unchained Vox dub)
3. "Chains" (S&M mix)

== Charts ==
=== Weekly charts ===
Chart (1995–1996)	Peak position
Australia (ARIA)	7
Austria (Ö3 Austria Top 40)	20
Europe (Eurochart Hot 100)	73
Germany (GfK)	86
New Zealand (Recorded Music NZ)	16
Scottish Singles Sales (Official Charts)	23
UK Singles (Official Charts)	22

=== Year-end charts ===
Chart (1995)	Position
Australia (ARIA)	65

== Certifications ==
Region	Certification	Certified units/sales
Australia (ARIA)	Platinum	70,000^{‡}
New Zealand (RMNZ)	Gold	15,000^{‡}
^{‡} Sales+streaming figures based on certification alone.

== Release history ==
Region	Date	Format(s)	Label(s)	Ref.
Australia	16 January 1995	CD; cassette	Columbia	
United Kingdom	22 July 1996	CD; cassette	Columbia	
