= Chains (Tina Arena song) =

1994 single by Tina Arena

Single by Tina Arena

from the album Don't Ask
- B-side: "Standing Up"
- Released: 29 August 1994
- Genre: Rock; pop
- Length: 4:22 (album version); 4:02 (radio edit)
- Label: Columbia; Epic
- Songwriters: Tina Arena; Pam Reswick; Steve Werfel
- Producer: David Tyson

Tina Arena singles chronology
"Woman's Work" (1991)	"Chains" (1994)	"Sorrento Moon (I Remember)" (1995)

Music video
- "Chains" on YouTube

"Chains" is a song by Australian singer-songwriter Tina Arena from her third studio album, Don't Ask (1994). It was composed by Arena, Pam Reswick and Steve Werfel and produced by David Tyson. The single was released in August 1994 by Columbia and Epic Records, receiving critical acclaim from mucic critics, whom praised Arena's vocal performance and comparing her to powerhouse singers like Celine Dion, Mariah Carey, and Olivia Newton-John.

"Chains" peaked at number four on Australia's ARIA Singles Chart as well as reaching number six in the United Kingdom, and charting well throughout Europe, earning her numerous awards in the process. The power ballad also became her biggest hit in North America, peaking at number 38 on the US Billboard Hot 100 and number 20 on the Canadian RPM 100 Hit Tracks chart. Two music videos were filmed for the song.

"Chains" was re-released featuring Jessica Mauboy and the Veronicas following a rendition of the track at the 2015 ARIA Awards where Arena was inducted into the ARIA Hall of Fame. In 2024, Arena released a new version with the Australian dance duo Shouse.

== Critical reception ==
"Chains" received favorable reviews from most music critics. Scottish Aberdeen Press and Journal praised Arena's "stunning voice". AllMusic editor Kelvin Hayes named it a "stellar showcase single". Larry Flick from Billboard magazine described it as a "immediately memorable, lyrically smart rhythm ballad" and added that "within an arrangement that smoothly builds from a subtle, finger-snappin' pop groove to a dramatic, rock-edged climax, Arena comes on strong with a voice that is a diva hybrid of Celine Dion, Mariah Carey, and Olivia Newton-John." James Richliano from The Boston Globe wrote that the singer "marries her powerhouse vocals to a smoky dance beat laced with edgy lyrics of a diva on the verge." A reviewer from British Crawley News said the song is "brilliant". Jim Farber from Entertainment Weekly compared Arena to Mariah Carey, adding that she "sings in the same overwrought, corporate style as Carey."

Irish Evening Herald complimented the singer as "a singing sensation by six". Monica Tan from The Guardian deemed it a "glass-breaking love song". Pan-European magazine Music & Media described it as "a pop song built on funky grooves" and "a good introduction to her warm vocals". In a separate review, a reviewer wrote, "Caged in a CD jewel box, but for how long? Since she's now a gold seller in her native Australia, and funky grooves are a game without frontiers by nature, you shouldn't sit back and wait." Alan Jones from Music Week named it "a beguiling introduction" to the Aussie singer. People Magazine stated that "wrapped in the glow of love, she turns in a muscular vocal on this rhythmic power ballad, effortlessly stretching her octave-leaping soprano." The editor remarked that Arena "possesses some valuable vocal assets: the pitch-perfect clarity of Celine Dion and the girlish sensuality of early Olivia Newton-John." In his review of the album, Mark Frith from Smash Hits felt the singer "still has her genius touch for the perfect ballad", as in the "mournful" mega-hit 'Chains'.

== Chart performance ==
In Arena's home country, Australia, it peaked at number four, while in New Zealand, the single also peaked within the top 10, at number seven. Worldwide, it was a top-10 hit in the United Kingdom. The single debuted at number 13 on the UK Singles Chart and peaked at number six during its fourth week on the chart, on 30 April 1995. Additionally, "Chains" reached the top 30 in Iceland and top 40 in Sweden. On the Eurochart Hot 100, it peaked at number 10 on 6 May. Outside Europe, the song reached number five in Israel, number 20 in Canada and number 38 on the US Billboard Hot 100. It was awarded with a silver record in the United Kingdom, with shipments of 200,000 units, and a double-platinum record in Australia for sales and streaming figures exceeding 140,000.

== Music videos ==
There are two music videos for "Chains", an Australian version and a US version.

In the Australian music video for "Chains", Arena sits on the floor in a dark living room. The windows are covered with paper, though sunlight enters in a few places. The furniture is covered with white cloth. Occasionally, Arena stands by a window, looking out through a small opening. In the middle of the video, she tears down the paper from the windows and the cloths are removed from the furniture. In a room now fully lit, Arena opens a window and throws out menswear and various things from the apartment that remind her of the bitter past. She dances around and, as the video ends, smiles at the camera.

As for the US version, it shows Arena is inside the large den or dungeon wrapped in vines; that was directed by Randee St. Nicholas.

== Legacy ==
In 2017, The Daily Telegraph ranked "Chains" among the "21 Best Power Ballads", describing it as a "smooth, sultry plea of a woman trapped in an unhealthy relationship".

== Track listings ==
- Australian CD single
1. "Chains" (Tina Arena, Pam Reswick, Steve Werfel) – 4:03
2. "Standing Up" (Arena, Heather Field, Rick Price) – 3:37
3. "Chains" (World Jeep Mix) (Arena, Reswick, Werfel) – 5:44
4. "Chains" (World Jazz Mix) (Arena, Reswick, Werfel) – 5:05
- UK CD single
1. "Chains" (Arena, Reswick, Werfel) – 4:03
2. "Standing Up" (Arena, Field, Price) – 3:37
3. "Chains" (World Jazz Mix) (Arena, Reswick, Werfel) – 5:05
- UK CD single (Part 2)
1. "Chains" (Arena, Reswick, Werfel) – 4:26
2. "Greatest Gift" (Acapella Version) (Arena, Robert Parde) – 4:21
3. "Many Rivers to Cross" (Live Version) (Jimmy Cliff) – 4:33
4. "Standing Up" (Arena, Field, Price) – 3:37

== Charts ==
=== Weekly charts ===
Chart (1994–1996)	Peak position
Australia (ARIA)	4
Australia (ARIA) The US Remixes	93
Canada Top Singles (RPM)	20
Canada Adult Contemporary (RPM)	7
Europe (Eurochart Hot 100)	10
Europe (European Hit Radio)	8
Germany (GfK)	68
Iceland (Íslenski Listinn Topp 40)	29
Ireland (IRMA)	9
Israel (Israeli Singles Chart)	5
Italy Airplay (Music & Media)	5
Netherlands (Dutch Top 40 Tipparade)	16
Netherlands (Single Top 100 Tipparade)	5
New Zealand (Recorded Music NZ)	7
Quebec (ADISQ)	4
Scottish Singles Sales (Official Charts)	8
Sweden (Sverigetopplistan)	38
UK Singles (Official Charts)	6
UK Airplay (Music Week)	3
US Billboard Hot 100	38
US Adult Contemporary (Billboard)	17
US Adult Pop Airplay (Billboard)	20
US Dance Club Songs (Billboard)	13
US Dance Singles Sales (Billboard)	48
US Pop Airplay (Billboard)	17

=== Year-end charts ===
Chart (1994)	Position
Australia (ARIA)	30

Chart (1995)	Position
Australia (ARIA)	74
Brazil (Crowley)	88
Europe (European Hit Radio)	29
UK Singles (OCC)	59
UK Airplay (Music Week)	15

Chart (1996)	Position
Canada Adult Contemporary (RPM)	70
US Top 40/Mainstream (Billboard)	78

== Certifications ==
Region	Certification	Certified units/sales
Australia (ARIA)	2× Platinum	140,000^{‡}
United Kingdom (BPI)	Silver	200,000^{^}
^{^} Shipments figures based on certification alone.^{‡} Sales+streaming figures based on certification alone.

== Release history ==
Region	Date	Format(s)	Label(s)	Ref.
Australia	29 August 1994	CD; cassette	Columbia	
Australia	16 January 1995	12-inch vinyl	Columbia	
United Kingdom	27 March 1995	CD; cassette	Columbia	
Japan	21 February 1996	CD	Epic	
United States	12 March 1996	Contemporary hit radio	Epic	

== 2015 version featuring Jessica Mauboy and the Veronicas ==
"Chains"

Single by Tina Arena featuring Jessica Mauboy and the Veronicas
- Released: 27 November 2015
- Length: 4:03
- Label: Positive Dream
- Songwriters: Tina Arena; Pam Reswick; Steve Werfel

Tina Arena singles chronology
"I Want to Love You" (2015)	"Chains" (2015)	"A Foreign Affair" (2017)

Jessica Mauboy singles chronology
"This Ain't Love" (2015)	"Chains" (2015)	"Where I'll Stay" (2016)

The Veronicas singles chronology
"Cruel" (2015)	"Chains" (2015)	"In My Blood" (2016)

"Chains" was rereleased on 27 November 2015 following a rendition of the track at the 2015 ARIA Awards where Arena was inducted into the ARIA Hall of Fame. The 2015 version features Jessica Mauboy and the Veronicas and was described by 2Day FM as the "highlight" of the Awards and one of the best ARIA performances. This version debuted at number 14 on the Australian Singles Chart, which was Arena's biggest hit on the singles chart in Australia since 2002.

=== Charts ===
Chart (2015)	Peak position
Australia (ARIA)	14
