= Every Mother Counts =

Every Mother Counts may refer to:

- Every Mother Counts (campaign), an advocacy and mobilization campaign founded by Christy Turlington
- Every Mother Counts (album), a 2011 compilation album
- Every Mother Counts 2012, a 2012 compilation album
