= Jesse Moss (filmmaker) =

American documentary filmmaker

- Born: San Francisco, California, U.S.
- Education: UC Berkeley
- Notable work: The Overnighters (2014); Boys State (2020)
- Spouse: Amanda McBaine
- Children: 2

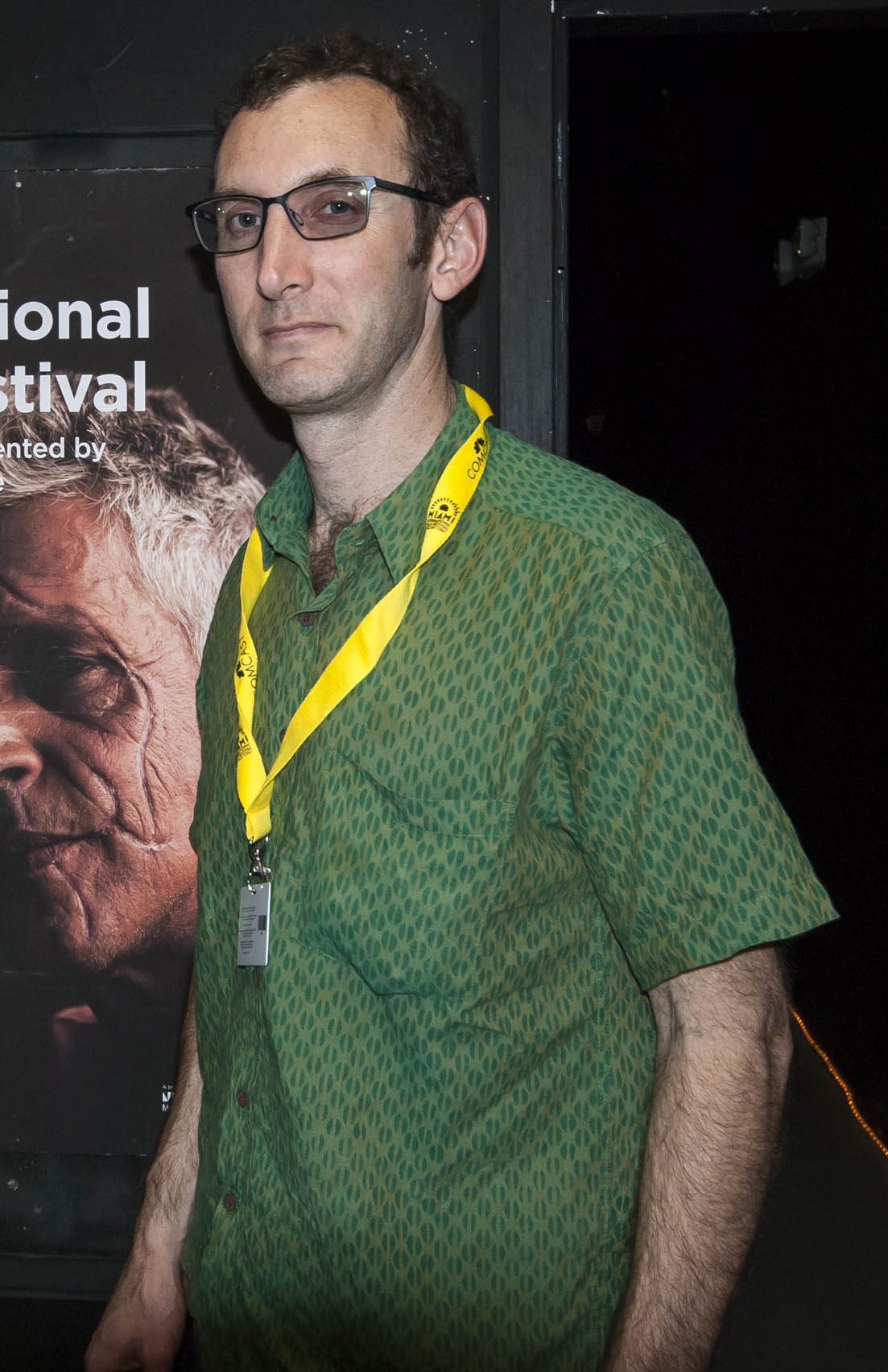
Jesse Moss at O Cinema Wynwood

Jesse Moss is an American documentary filmmaker and cinematographer known for his cinéma vérité style. His 2014 film, The Overnighters, was shortlisted for best documentary feature at the Oscars. He has directed four independent, feature-length films, and three television documentaries and has produced 15 documentaries.

Moss is a cinema lecturer at San Francisco State University and lives in the San Francisco Bay Area with his wife and frequent collaborator Amanda McBaine and their two children. His office is in the Presidio, San Francisco.

== Early life ==
Moss was born in San Francisco and raised in Palo Alto, California. His parents divorced when he was five. Though Moss never had any childhood aspirations toward filmmaking, his parents valued journalism. When Moss was a child, photojournalist Richard Boyle, who was famously depicted as a conflict-prone character dealing with substance abuse problems in Oliver Stone's 1986 movie Salvador, stayed in the Moss home and regaled the young Moss and his brother with stories of his adventures overseas. "In a way, that was inspiring," Moss told David Poland in 2014.

Moss attended Palo Alto High School. He was not raised in a religious family and considers himself a secular Jew.

== Early career ==
Moss graduated from the University of California, Berkeley in 1993. He moved to Washington, D.C. following graduation, where he worked for Congressman Vic Fazio. He was later promoted to policy assistant and speechwriter. Although he enjoyed his work in politics, he felt creatively frustrated. When he was 26, he met Christine Choy, a documentary filmmaker who was showing her film Who Killed Vincent Chin? He was struck that documentary film could be journalistic, political, and artistic. Inspired by Who Killed Vincent Chin? and documentaries such as Hoop Dreams and The War Room, Moss decided to pursue filmmaking. So he quit his job and moved to New York in 1996 to work for Choy.

Later, he worked as an in-house producer at Cabin Creek Films for documentary filmmaker Barbara Kopple, who had made Harlan County, USA (1976) and American Dream (1990). "Harlan County, USA is the high water mark of documentary filmmaking for me," Moss told IndieWire. "It really takes us inside that extractive industry and finds the human heart of that experience."

== Film career ==
Moss' first feature-length documentary was Con Man (2002), which explores the life of James Arthur Hogue, a thief and skilled imposter who fabricated a series of fictional identities for himself and successfully conned his way into Princeton University. Moss was director and producer. Hogue was Moss' upperclassman at Palo Alto High School in 1985 when he posed as a student. The film was later picked up by HBO and was screened as part of Cinemax's Reel Life series in 2002.

In 2004, Moss made Speedo: A Demolition Derby Love Story, which he wrote, produced and directed. Speedo follows the promising racing career and troubled family life of Ed "Speedo" Jager, one of the nation's top demolition derby drivers. Speedo made its world premiere at the 2003 South by Southwest festival. It won the "Grand Jury Prize for Best Documentary Feature" at the inaugural Independent Film Festival Boston in May 2003. The film was later picked up by POV on PBS.

Moss' next feature documentary, Full Battle Rattle (2008), was co-directed with filmmaker Tony Gerber. It is about the simulation in the fictional Iraqi town of Medina Wasl that the US Army built in the Mojave Desert, which it uses to help train its army units before they deploy to Iraq. The pair were granted permission to live inside the simulation for the duration of a three-week training rotation. Moss and Gerber filmed on both sides of the "war": Gerber lived with the Army Brigade in training and Moss lived in Medina Wasl. Full Battle Rattle made its world premiere at the 2008 Berlin International Film Festival.

Moss is best known for his 2014 film The Overnighters, which Eric Kohn of Indiewire called "one of the most remarkable examples of layered non-fiction storytelling to come along in some time" and the Los Angeles Times called "Exceptional…a film of disquieting moral complexity."

The Overnighters follows the story of Pastor Jay Reinke, a Lutheran minister in Williston, North Dakota, where the oil boom has attracted desperate men looking for work while also causing a severe housing shortage in the area. Reinke opens his church to the men, undermining his place in the eyes of several members of his congregation.

The Overnighters was shortlisted for Best Documentary Feature at the Oscars and was named best documentary of 2014 by Indiewire's "The Playlist", Paste and Toronto Film Critics Association.

As of Spring 2015, Moss is currently working on Reality Party, a new short film about a group of Southern California teenagers who throw a "fake" party, according to Moss' website.

Alongside Amanda McBaine, Moss co-directed the political, coming-of-age documentary Boys State (2020). It won the Grand Jury Prize in the U.S Documentary Competition at the 2020 Sundance Film Festival. It was reportedly acquired by A24 and Apple for a record $12 million.

== Style ==
Moss is most inspired by cinéma vérité (observational filmmaking), and in the case of The Overnighters, he wanted to try to film a movie without voiceover or extensive interviews, but film dramatic scenes as they happened.

Jeanette Catsoulis of The New York Times praised Moss for his "observational, near-invisible presence" in The Overnighters.

Moss is also known for working with a small or nonexistent crew, partially because of budget constraints and partially because of the increased mobility a one-man crew allows for. Moss shot the entirety of The Overnighters by himself on location in North Dakota from 2012 to 2013

== Filmography ==
- Con Man (2002)
- Speedo: A Demolition Derby Love Story (2004)
- Rated R: Republicans in Hollywood (2004)
- Full Battle Rattle (2008)
- Extreme Civil War Reenactors (2012)
- The Overnighters (2014)
- Dirty Money: Payday (2018, episode: "Payday")
- The Family (2019, miniseries)
- Boys State (2020)
- Mayor Pete (2021)
- The Mission (2023)
- Girls State (2024)
- War Game (2024)
- Teenage Wasteland (2025)

== Awards and nominations ==
=== Speedo: A Demolition Derby Love Story ===
- Winner, Grand Jury Prize, Boston Independent Film Festival
- Winner, Audience Award, Full Frame Documentary Film Festival
- Winner, Jury Prize, Newport International Film Festival

=== Full Battle Rattle ===
- Winner, Special Jury Prize, 2008 SXSW Film Festival

=== The Overnighters ===
- Winner, Special Jury Prize for Intuitive Filmmaking (Sundance Film Festival)
- Nomination, Outstanding Directorial Achievement in Documentary (Directors Guild of America)
- Oscar shortlist for Best Documentary Feature
- Best Documentary Film of 2014 (Toronto Film Critics Association)
- Nominations, Best Documentary Feature and Best Director (Cinema Eye)
- Voted Best Documentary of 2014 (Nonfics)
- Top Documentary of 2014 (Indiewire's "The Playlist")
- The Best Documentary of 2014 (Paste)

=== Boys State ===
- Winner, Grand Jury Prize, U.S Documentary Competition (Sundance Film Festival)
