= Love Saves =

Studio album by Tina Arena
- Released: 14 July 2023
- Length: 43:53
- Label: Positive Dream
- Producer: Mattias Lindblom

Tina Arena chronology
Quand tout Recommence (2018)	Love Saves (2023)	Way of the World (2026)

Singles from Love Saves
- 1. "House" Released: 26 May 2023; 2. "Danser sur la Glace" Released: 26 May 2023; 3. "Dancing on Thin Ice" Released: 30 June 2023

Love Saves is the thirteenth studio album by Australian singer and songwriter Tina Arena, released on 14 July 2023. The album was announced on 26 May 2023 alongside the release of two lead singles. Also included is the single "Church", released in 2021. Love Saves debuted at number 2 on the ARIA Charts.

At the 2023 ARIA Music Awards, the album was nominated for Best Adult Contemporary Album.

== Critical reception ==
Professional ratings
Review scores
Source	Rating
Retropop Magazine	5/5 stars

Retropop Magazine called the album "her most personal body of work to date" saying "the LP sees the Australian superstar working through a period of personal turmoil and laying herself bare through her pointed lyrics and exceptional vocal performance."

Jeff Jenkins from Stack Magazine said "Her voice remains an instrument of beauty, but Arena refuses to trade on past glories in this collection of soaring, dramatic pop."

Bryget Chrisfield from Beat Magazine said "[Tina] boasts one of the greatest Australian voices of all time and Love Saves rightfully places Tina's impeccable pipes front and centre." Chrisfield closed her review by saying "with her first album of original material in eight years, it's thrilling to witness Tina strutting into full power."

== Commercial performance ==
Love Saves debuted at number 2 on the ARIA Albums Chart with 2,023 sales (1,613 physical). In its second week, the album fell to number 371.

== Track listing ==
Love Saves track listing
No.	Title	Writer(s)	Length
1.	"Church"	Tina Arena; Tania Doko; Mattias Lindblom; Michael Zlanabitnig	3:46
2.	"Cry Me a Miracle"	Arena; Doko; Lindblom; West	3:54
3.	"Outrun the Night"	Arena; Jack Earle; Lindblom	3:45
4.	"Can't Say Anything"	Arena; Doko; Earle; Lindblom	3:46
5.	"Devil in Me"	Arena; Doko; Earle; Lindblom	4:26
6.	"Dancing on Thin Ice"	Arena; Doko; Lindblom; Zlanabitnig	4:08
7.	"Mother to Her Child"	Arena; Doko; Lindblom; Zlanabitnig	4:29
8.	"Dared to Love You First"	Arena; Doko; Michael Paynter	4:09
9.	"Love Saves"	Arena; Doko; Earle; Lindblom	3:41
10.	"House"	Arena; Doko; Lindblom; Zlanabitnig	3:44
11.	"Danser sur la Glace"	Arena; Doko; Lindblom; François Welgryn; Zlanabitnig	4:05
Total length:			43:53

== Personnel ==
- Mattias Lindblom – producer
- Robert L. Smith – mastering
- Mark Broughton – mixing
- Lewis Mitchell – mastering (vinyl)
- Andy Taylor – guitar
- Tony Levin – bass
- André Ferrari – drums
- Dea Norberg – backing vocals
- Tania Doko – backing vocals
- Steve Van Velvet – keyboards, programming, guitar
- Jack Earle – piano
- Michael Zlanabitning – piano
- Anders Wollbeck – keyboards, guitar
- Mattias Lindblom – drums
- Michael Paynter – backing vocals, engineering (track 8)
- Aaron Dobos – engineering
- Mats Landberg – engineering
- William Rousseau – engineering

== Charts ==
Chart performance for Love Saves
Chart (2023)	Peak position
Australian Albums (ARIA)	2
