= Robert L. Smith (sound engineer) =

American record producer and recording engineer (1965)

- Born: 1965 (age 60–61)
- Origin: New York City, New York, U.S.
- Occupations: Producer, recording engineer, mixing engineer, mastering engineer
- Years active: 1986–present
- Website: www.defyrecordings.com

Robert L. Smith (born 1965) is an American record producer, recording engineer, mixing engineer, mastering engineer, educator, and entrepreneur based in New York City. Active in the recording industry since the 1980s, Smith's career spans commercial recording, film sound, music production, artist development, and mentorship.

His work includes collaborations with major recording artists, charting releases, film projects, and educational initiatives within the music industry.His work includes producing, recording and mixing numerous Billboard top 100 charting songs including 'Teenage Dream' and 'Hey, Soul Sister' with The Warblers for hit television show Glee. Robert has worked on recording projects with Lady Gaga for the single 'Speechless' which topped the Billboard Hot Singles Sales Chart in 2010 as well as tracks by Aerosmith, David Bowie, U2 and Stacie Rose.

Robert is a founding member of New York's Pyramid Recording Collective, and has his own music production company called Defy Recordings.

== Early life and education ==
Smith developed an interest in music production and audio engineering during the transition from analog to digital recording technologies. He entered the New York recording industry during the late 1980s, a period often regarded as the final era of large commercial recording studios.

== Career ==
=== New York Studio Years ===
Beginning in 1987, Smith worked in New York City's major commercial recording facilities during the height of the analog studio era. This period provided extensive experience in recording, editing, mixing, and production across a wide variety of musical genres.

Among his professional influences were producer and engineer Phil Ramone, producer Neil Dorfsman, and producer and engineer Gary Lyons. Smith has cited these mentors as shaping both his technical approach and philosophy of artist collaboration.

By the late 1990s, as the recording industry transitioned toward smaller independent studios and digital workflows, Smith moved into freelance production and engineering.

Over the course of his career, he has accumulated hundreds of credits spanning popular music, documentary film, television, and live productions. His collaborators and clients have included internationally recognized artists such as Lady Gaga, David Bowie, U2, Chaka Khan, Stevie Wonder, Whitney Houston, Michael Jackson, Mariah Carey, Aerosmith, Sting, Keith Richards, George Benson, Miles Davis, and Plácido Domingo.

His recording work also includes projects involving Christina Aguilera, Nile Rodgers, Sia, Lenny Kravitz, Cyndi Lauper, Janet Jackson, Bon Jovi, Luther Vandross, George Clinton, Billy Porter, and Lang Lang.

=== Recording and production work ===
Smith has accumulated credits on hundreds of recordings spanning popular music, television, film, and independent releases.

His work includes sessions involving artists such as Aerosmith, David Bowie, U2, and Lady Gaga. He contributed to Lady Gaga's single "Speechless," which reached the top of the Billboard Hot Singles Sales chart.

Smith also recorded and mixed songs for the television series Glee, including performances by The Warblers of "Teenage Dream" and "Hey, Soul Sister," both of which appeared on the Billboard Hot 100.

=== Film and Television ===
Among his best-known projects is 20 Feet from Stardom, the Academy Award-winning documentary that also received Grammy recognition. His work on Full Battle Rattle earned an Emmy Award nomination, while Burma Soldier also received Emmy recognition.

Additional film and television credits include Over the Moon, The Get Down, For Colored Girls, Waitress, The Devil Came on Horseback, Baseball: The Tenth Inning, Knuckleball, The Seven Five, Alias Ruby Blade, and No Woman No Cry.

Smith has also collaborated on projects involving Sir Paul McCartney and producer Peter Asher, including work connected to Steve Martin and the Steep Canyon Rangers.

Smith contributed to the Netflix series The Get Down, directed by Baz Luhrmann. Work associated with the series included the single "Telepathy," performed by Christina Aguilera featuring Nile Rodgers and Sia, which reached number one on Billboard charts.

=== Defy Recordings ===
In 2007, Smith founded Defy Recordings, a production facility in Manhattan's Hell's Kitchen neighborhood.

Defy Recordings provides recording, editing, overdubbing, mixing, and mastering services for musicians, composers, and independent artists. The studio was profiled by Mix Magazine in October 2009, which described its role in providing recording, editing, overdubbing, mixing, and mastering services to independent musicians, composers, and singer-songwriters.

The studio is equipped with a Pro Tools HD system alongside outboard hardware from API, Focusrite, Manley Labs, Avalon, Chandler, SPL, and Empirical Labs.

=== Other works ===
In addition to his engineering and production work, Smith has pursued entrepreneurial and collaborative ventures within the music community.

He was a founding member of the Pyramid Recording Collective, an initiative that brought together recording professionals in New York. Although active for a relatively brief period, the project reflected broader efforts to create collaborative professional networks during a period of rapid industry change.

Smith has also maintained an online presence through Defy Recordings and related educational and creative platforms.

He has taught or presented at institutions including Drexel University and the City College of New York, and has participated in professional development initiatives within the creative industries.

== Awards and nominations ==
- Academy Award winner for 20 Feet from Stardom (2014)
- Grammy Award winner for 20 Feet from Stardom (2014)
- Grammy Award winner for Miles Davis's Doo-Bop (1993)
- Emmy Award nominee for Full Battle Rattle (2010)
- Grammy Award nominee for Glee: The Music, Volume 4 (2011)
- Grammy Award nominee for Liza Minnelli's Gently (1996)
- Grammy Award nominee for Rickie Lee Jones's It's Like This (2000)
