= Speechless (Lady Gaga song) =

Song by Lady Gaga

Song by Lady Gaga

from the EP The Fame Monster
- Released: November 18, 2009
- Studio: Record Plant (Los Angeles)
- Genre: Rock
- Length: 4:31
- Label: Streamline; KonLive; Cherrytree; Interscope
- Songwriter: Lady Gaga
- Producer: Ron Fair

Audio video
- "Speechless" on YouTube

"Speechless" is a song by the American singer Lady Gaga from her extended play (EP), The Fame Monster (2009). The song was written by Gaga to convince her father to undergo open-heart surgery for his malfunctioning aortic valve and remind her younger fans to appreciate their parents. "Speechless" is about Gaga's fear of death. A rock power ballad, the song has elements of 1970s rock, blues rock, glam rock and country music.

"Speechless" initially received mixed reviews from critics; some praised it for its emotional depth and influences from the band Queen while others criticized it as weak and insincere. Retrospective reviewers described it as one of Gaga's best songs and praised her vocals. Billboard included the song in its 2017 list of the 100 Best Deep Cuts by 21st Century Pop Stars. "Speechless" charted in the US, the UK and Canada. Gaga performed the song in several live appearances including the 2009 American Music Awards, the 2009 Royal Variety Performance, the Monster Ball Tour (2009–2011), and the 52nd Annual Grammy Awards.

== Background ==
On November 18, 2009, the American singer Lady Gaga released The Fame Monster, an extended play that includes "Speechless". Ron Fair arranged and conducted the song, and was responsible for the production, with Gaga and Tal Herzberg co-producing with him. The song was recorded at Record Plant Studios in Los Angeles, using live instruments like drum (performed by Abraham Laboriel Jr.), guitar (John Goux), bass guitar (Herzberg) and piano (Gaga). She described the process as having a "really organic, delicious feeling". Herzberg handled the audio engineering with Frank Wolff. "Speechless" was mixed by Jack Joseph Puig, and the audio mastering was done at Oasis Mastering in Burbank, California by Gene Grimaldi. Personnel assisting the recording included Ryan Kennedy, Tal Oz and Joe Cory.

In a November 2009 interview with MTV, Gaga explained that her father had a malfunctioning aortic valve, causing his body to pump only a third of the necessary blood with each heartbeat for an extended period. She added: "My mom called me and I was very depressed. I was on tour and I couldn't leave, so I went into the studio and I wrote this song 'Speechless,' and it's about these phone calls. My dad used to call me after he'd had a few drinks and I wouldn't know what to say. I was speechless and I just feared that I would lose him and I wouldn't be there."

On each track of The Fame Monster, Gaga expresses some of her biggest fears. She wrote "Speechless" to convey her "fear of death" and implore her father to have the open-heart surgery needed for his condition. In October 2009, Gaga confirmed that he had undergone the surgery. In expressing her desire for the song to inspire her younger fans to appreciate their parents, Gaga emphasized their irreplaceable role in a child's life.

== Music and lyrics ==
"Speechless"
A 25-second sample of "Speechless". A rock power ballad, the song incorporates elements of glam rock and country music.

"Speechless" is a rock power ballad with influences of 1970s rock, blues rock, glam rock and country music. The song consists of vocal harmonies and guitar riffs which, according to Evan Sawdey of PopMatters, are comparable to the work of the band Queen and its frontman Freddie Mercury. Katrin Horn, a postdoctoral fellow in American studies, described her vocal delivery as "slightly raspy" with "a little vibrato". Musicologist Alexandra Apolloni wrote that Gaga's vocal affectations verge on the melodramatic, underscoring the intentional "performativity" in using vocal techniques that convey a sense of strain. According to Apolloni, the introduction—characterized by theatrical "ohs"—immediately immerses the listener in heightened emotional landscapes, followed by moments of "vocal ugliness", particularly in high chest voice and slurred pitches. She added that these exaggerated vocal gestures serve as intensified pleas for emotional sympathy. In the final verse, Gaga's voice takes on "harshness and roughness", which echoes the theme of vocal disruption explored in the song.

Critics discussed the song's lyrics and themes. Analyzing the emotional narrative of "Speechless", psychoanalyst Robert J. Benton wrote that although the song is dedicated to Gaga's father, the lyrics convey a romantic breakup. Benoten believed after expressing hurt and anger to her ex-lover in the initial lyrics, Gaga has a taunting desire for revenge in the closing line "Why are you so speechless?" Exploring Gaga's "musical intertexts" on The Fame Monster, authors Lori Burns, Alyssa Woods and Marc Lafrance wrote that in "Speechless", she adopts a 1970s rock ballad style reminiscent of artists like Mercury, John Lennon and Elton John. The authors drew thematic connections to Mercury's desire to seek acceptance as an outsider in "Somebody to Love", Lennon's pursuit of a utopian society in "Imagine" and John's emphasis on "pure devotion through music and word" in "Your Song". Burns, Woods and Lafrance thought that by invoking this "genealogy", Gaga aims to promote unbiased love and a new world order emphasizing equality and fairness. As such, they deemed "Speechless" a sociomusical activism piece.

== Critical reception ==
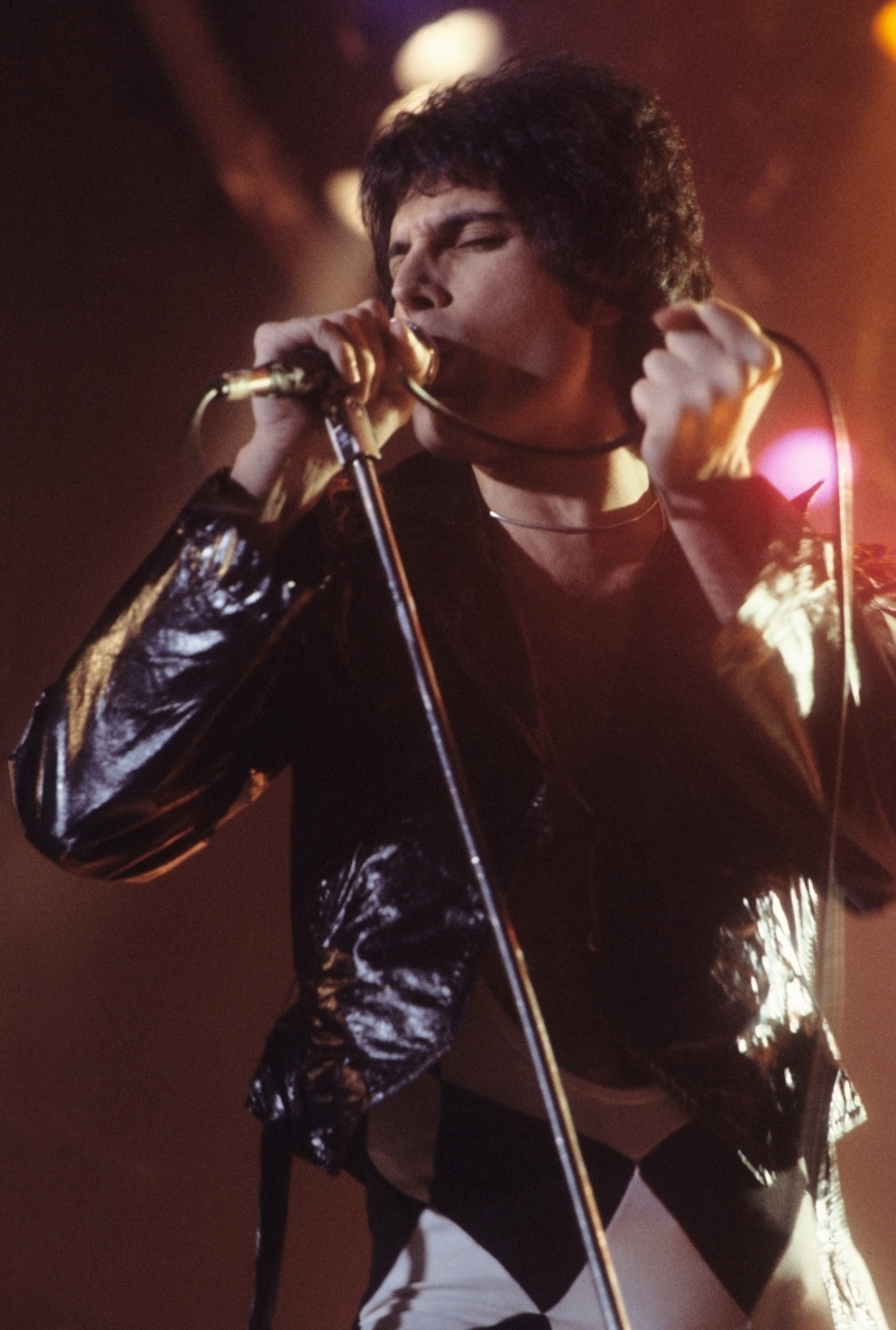
Critics compared "Speechless" with the work of Freddie Mercury (pictured in 1977).

Initial reviews of "Speechless" were mixed. Among others, Ed Power of Hot Press and Brian Linder of IGN reviewed it positively. Power called it a "straight up glam stomper". Linder thought in "Speechless", Gaga introduces a rare moment of subtlety on The Fame Monster, showcasing clever songwriting and emotional depth, although he found that her "enigmatic image" may impede some from fully engaging with the material's core. Reviewers drew comparisons between the song and the work of other artists, particularly Freddie Mercury. Sawdey recognized parallels between "Speechless" and Queen's music, commending the song for its ability to hold its own without feeling like a "gimmick". Stephen Thomas Erlewine from AllMusic noted a "galvanized Eurotrash finish" to it, comparing the guitar playing in the song to Noel Gallagher's work in Oasis.

Other reviews were negative. Kitty Empire of The Observer opined that "Speechless" is Gaga's "weak point" in the album. In Slant Magazine, Sal Cinquemani deemed the song the sole "dud" on The Fame Monster because of its perceived inauthenticity amidst Gaga's bolder material. Josh Modell of Spin criticized its tonal quality, as if reaching for an untapped audience he deemed unsuitable for Gaga.

Media outlets Rolling Stone, Billboard, The Guardian, Vulture, Uproxx and Glamour retrospectively ranked "Speechless" as one of Gaga's best songs. (Note: Attributed to multiple references) Billboard commended its rock production and Mercury-esque vocals that underscore her versatility beyond synth-pop, and The Guardian wrote of the song's distinctive playfulness, with "slurred, whiskey-soaked vocals". To Vulture, "Speechless" is one of pop music's important Oedipal-complex ballads, portraying a shift as Gaga suddenly sees her father as an equal and expresses intense emotions and a heartbroken perspective on love. According to Uproxx, "Speechless" unearthed Gaga's musical prowess beneath her eccentric persona. Declaring it as Gaga's best ballad, Glamour praised her vocals and described "Speechless" as a "refreshing and moving" song with "a seamless blend of vulnerability and power". In 2017, Billboard ranked it number 29 in its list of 100 Best Deep Cuts by 21st Century Pop Stars, adding that the ballad was one of the first strong indications of Gaga's proficiency as a "a traditional pianist-singer-songwriter" and her future career trajectory.

== Chart performance ==
"Speechless" debuted on the Billboard Hot 100 chart at number ninety-four for the week of December 12, 2009. After the medley performance of the song at the 2010 Grammy Awards, "Speechless" topped the Billboard Hot Singles Sales chart, with sales of 7,000 units according to Nielsen Soundscan, becoming Gaga's third number-one single. It also shifted an additional 13,000 digital downloads, just below the main Hot Digital Songs chart. As of August 2010, the song had sold 197,000 downloads according to Nielsen Soundscan. "Speechless" also debuted on the Billboard Canadian Hot 100 at number sixty-seven. On the UK Singles Chart, "Speechless" reached number eighty-eight of December 27, 2009. As of 2020, it has sold 60,000 digital downloads and acquired 3.38 million streams.

== Live performances and cover ==
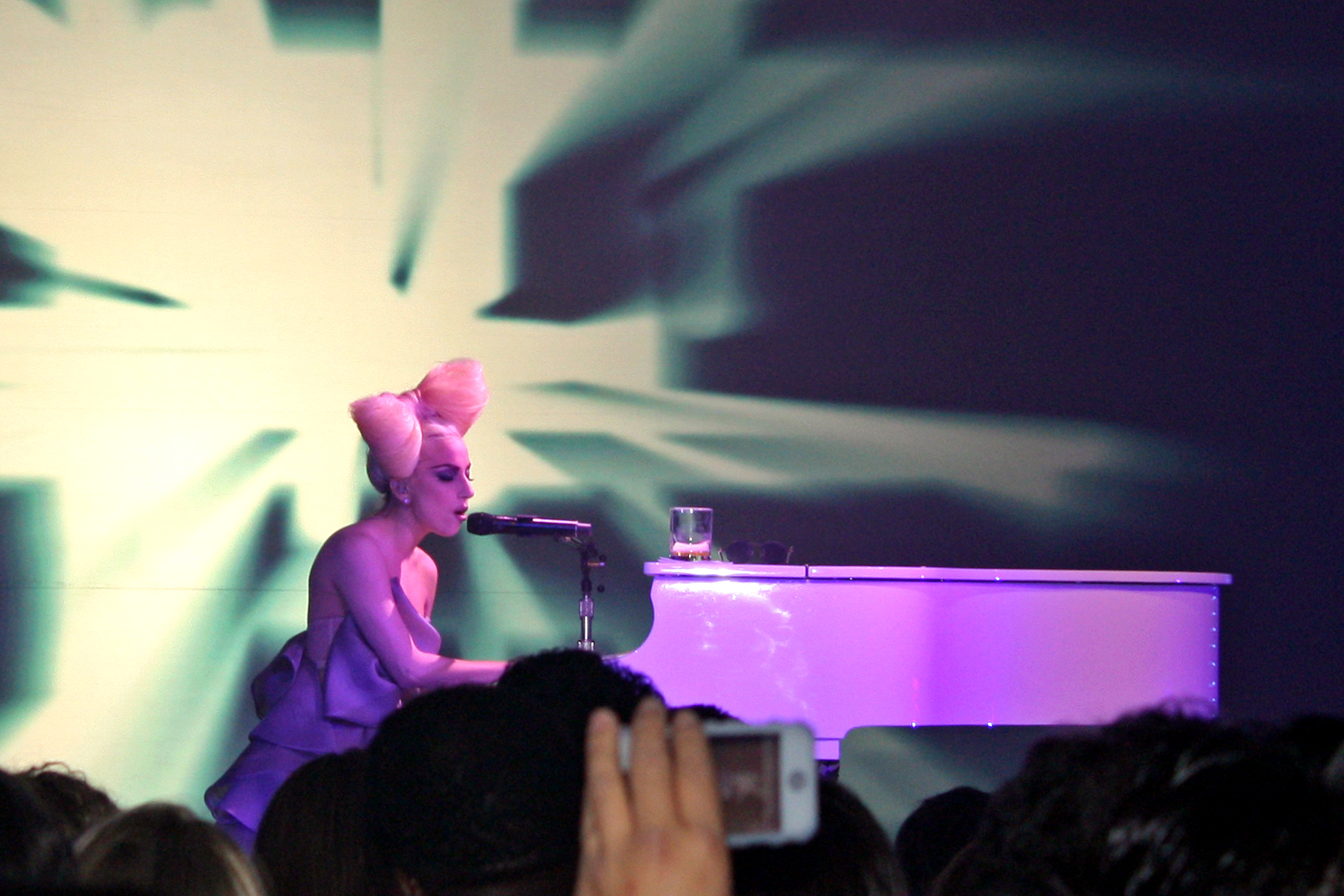
Gaga performing "Speechless" at the 2009 Vevo Launch Event in New York

"Speechless" was performed for the first time at the 30th anniversary celebration for the Los Angeles Museum of Contemporary Art on November 14, 2009. Gaga sang on a pink Steinway & Sons piano decorated with painted-on butterflies. The performance included ballet dancers from the Bolshoi Theatre as part of "The Shortest Musical You Will Never See Again", an art piece directed by Francesco Vezzoli. At the 2009 American Music Awards, Gaga performed "Speechless" alongside "Bad Romance" from The Fame Monster. She wore a flesh-colored bodysuit adorned with white piping, simulating ribs and a spine with embedded flashing lights. Starting with "Bad Romance", she transitioned into "Speechless" by breaking open a glass box containing a piano with her microphone stand. Seated on the piano bench, she set the instrument on fire and continued the performance, smashing liquor bottles on it throughout. Gaga performed the two songs again at The Ellen DeGeneres Show on November 25, 2009. She sang "Speechless" at the Royal Variety Performance, which was attended by Queen Elizabeth II. Wearing a red latex dress inspired by the Elizabethan era, Gaga played a piano suspended ten feet in the air that was supported by stilts.

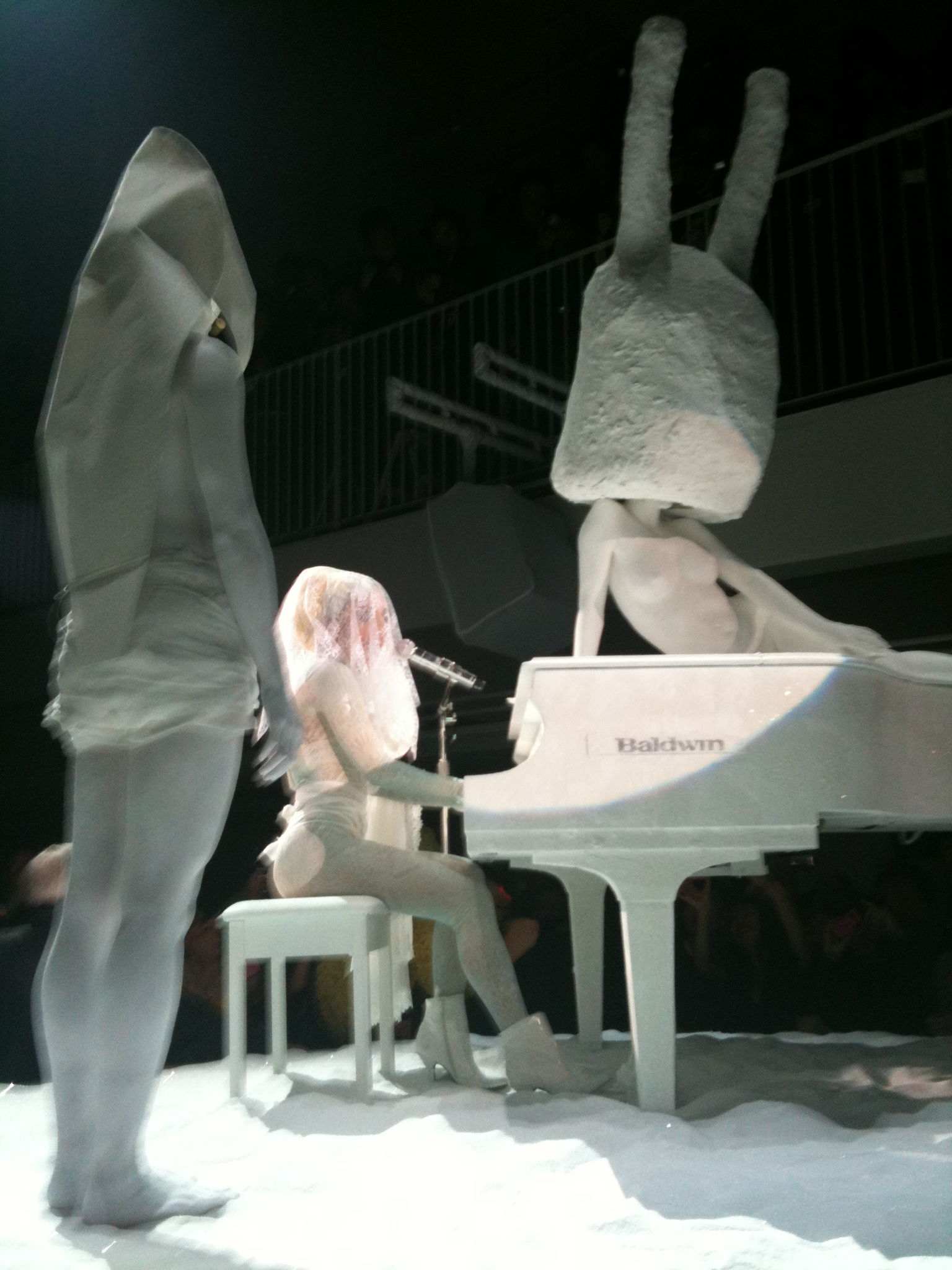
Gaga performing "Speechless" in Tokyo, Japan in 2010

On December 8, 2009, Gaga performed the song live at the launch party of Vevo in New York City. She played the piano while sporting a large platinum blonde hair bow. Billboard praised Gaga for showcasing emotional depth through her vocals and facial expressions. "Speechless" was on the setlist of Gaga's Monster Ball Tour (2009–2011). During the original version of the concert series, "Speechless" came after an acoustic version of "Poker Face". Jane Stevenson from Toronto Star called the "Speechless" performance the "emotional high point" of the show. In the revamped Monster Ball shows, Gaga dressed in bra and knickers and performed the song on a flaming piano.

Gaga was the opening performer of the 52nd Annual Grammy Awards on January 31, 2010. She appeared in a green outfit with glittery shoulder pads. After performing "Poker Face", she was thrown into a flaming bin with the word "Rejected" written on it. Covered in ashes, she reemerged on stage seconds later, joined by Elton John. They sat at opposite sides of a double piano and sang "Speechless" as a medley with John's "Your Song". In 2018, Ashley Laderer from Billboard named it Gaga's eleventh best live performance, calling it "heartfelt". In April 2010, Gaga held a mini-concert in Japan for MAC Cosmetics, collaborating with the Canadian performance artist, Terence Koh. Billed as "GagaKoh", the concert took place on a rotating stage where Koh had created a statue of a naked woman with rabbit ears. "Speechless" was one of the three songs Gaga performed at the event, besides "Bad Romance" and "Alejandro". In May 2011, Gaga performed a jazz version of the song during Radio 1's Big Weekend in Carlisle, Cumbria.

In April 2017, Gaga performed "Speechless" on the piano during both weekends of the Coachella Festival, where she was a headliner. At the second show, she included a snippet of "Bad Romance" to the performance. The song was performed at select dates of The Mayhem Ball tour (2025–2026).

In 2019, American singer King Princess covered "Speechless" for BBC Radio 1 as part of the station's Piano Sessions. She changed the lyric "I'll never talk again" to "I'll never love again" and swapped "boy" for "girl" in the line "Oh boy, you've left me speechless". The cover received positive reviews from Billboard, MTV News and Consequence.

== Credits and personnel ==
Credits adapted from the liner notes of The Fame Monster.

- Lady Gaga – vocals, songwriting, co-production, piano
- Ron Fair – production, arrangement and conduction
- Robert L. Smith – co-production, audio engineering
- Abraham Laboriel Jr. – drums
- John Goux – guitar
- Frank Wolff – audio engineering
- Jack Joseph Puig – audio mixing
- Gene Grimaldi – audio mastering at Oasis Mastering, Burbank, California
- Ryan Kennedy – assistance
- Tal Oz – assistance
- Joe Cory – assistance

== Charts ==
Weekly chart performance for "Speechless"
Chart (2009)	Peak position
Canada Hot 100 (Billboard)	67
Scottish Singles Sales (Official Charts)	81
UK Singles (Official Charts)	88
US Billboard Hot 100	94

== Certifications and sales ==
Certifications and sales for "Speechless"
Region	Certification	Certified units/sales
United Kingdom	—	60,000
United States (RIAA)	Gold	500,000^{‡}
^{‡} Sales+streaming figures based on certification alone.
