= The Overnighters =

- Theatrical release poster
- Directed by: Jesse Moss
- Written by: Jesse Moss
- Produced by: Jesse Moss; Amanda McBaine
- Cinematography: Jesse Moss
- Edited by: Jeff Seymann Gilbert
- Music by: T. Griffin
- Production companies: Mlle End Films; Al Di La Films; Impact Partners
- Distributed by: Drafthouse Films
- Release dates: January 18, 2014 (Sundance); October 24, 2014 (United States)
- Running time: 90 minutes
- Country: United States
- Language: English
- Budget: $28.95
- Box office: $100,022

The Overnighters is a 2014 American documentary film written, directed, and produced by Jesse Moss. It premiered on January 18, 2014, as part of the U.S. Documentary Competition section of the Sundance Film Festival, and it won the festival's Special Jury Prize. The film also won a prize at the Miami International Film Festival, at which it was screened on March 13, 2014.

After its premiere at Sundance, Drafthouse Films acquired the film's distribution rights. It was released on October 24, 2014, in United States, with a portion of all box office receipts being donated to affordable housing charities in North Dakota.

== Synopsis ==
The film depicts the lives of people chasing the dream of high salaries in the North Dakota oil boom, only to discover that affordable housing is almost impossible to find. Much of the focus is on the efforts of local Lutheran pastor Jay Reinke, who allowed over 1,000 different people to stay at his Williston, North Dakota, church over a period of about two years.

== Reception ==
The Overnighters was received positively by critics. On review aggregator website Rotten Tomatoes, it has a 97% approval rating based on reviews from 74 critics, with an average score of 8.5/10; the site's "critics consensus" reads: "Hard-hitting, absorbing, and painfully relevant, The Overnighters offers an urgent and compassionate picture of life in 21st century America." On Metacritic, the film has a score of 89 out of 100 based on reviews from 20 critics, indicating "universal acclaim".

Justin Chang of Variety called the film "tough-minded, admirably unresolved". David Rooney of The Hollywood Reporter gave the film a positive review, writing: "A scenario with present-day echoes of The Grapes of Wrath yields perceptive insights into the way we view outsiders." Katie Walsh of Indiewire said: "The Overnighters is starkly bleak and devastatingly humane, and an indelible American documentary." Colin Covert of the Minneapolis Star Tribune gave the film three-and-a-half stars out of four and noted: "The film features stunning third-act revelations that compel viewers to rethink its characters' actions and motivations."

== Accolades ==
Year	Award	Category	Recipient	Result
2014	Sundance Film Festival	U.S. Grand Jury Prize: Documentary	Jesse Moss	Nominated
2014	Sundance Film Festival	U.S. Documentary Special Jury Award for Achievement for Intuitive Filmmaking	Jesse Moss	Won
2014	Miami International Film Festival	Miami's Knight Documentary Award	Jesse Moss (Tied with Finding Vivian Maier)	Won
2014	Full Frame Documentary Film Festival	Full Frame Inspiration Award	Jesse Moss	Won
2014	Crested Butte Film Festival	Best Documentary Feature	Jesse Moss	Won
