= Oriol Elcacho =

Spanish male model

- Born: August 8, 1979 (age 45); Barcelona, Spain
- Occupation: Model

Oriol Elcacho (born August 8, 1979) is a Spanish male model from Barcelona. He is known for being the face of BVLGARI's AQVA. He is referred to as the "Spanish Adonis".

Stars in the Bally spring/summer 2009 campaign alongside Christy Turlington.
