= Way of the World (EP) =

EP by Tina Arena
- Released: 16 October 2026
- Studios: Synth Temple, Melbourne
- Length: 29:54
- Label: Positive Dream
- Producers: Tina Arena; Luke Howard; François Tétaz

Tina Arena chronology
Love Saves (2023)	Way of the World (2026)

Singles from Way of the World
- 1. "True Faith" Released: 7 August 2026ref name="WotW"/>

Way of the World is an extended play by the Australian singer and songwriter Tina Arena, announced in August 2026 and released on 16 October 2026. Way of the World debuted at number 11 on the ARIA Albums Chart.

== Critical reception ==
Matthew Hocter from Beyond the Encore said that "Way of the World combines orchestration, analogue synthesis and an exceptional understanding of what a human voice can communicate" and called the release "exquisite".

== Track listing ==
Way of the World track listing (with "Mad World" available only on CD/Vinyl)
No.	Title	Writer(s)	Length
1.	"True Faith"	Gillian Gilbert; Stephen Hague; Peter Hook; Stephen Morris; Bernard Sumner	6:40
2.	"Way of the World"	Frank Millward; Ollie Olsen	3:48
3.	"Enjoy the Silence"	Martin Gore	5:10
4.	"Ordinary World"	Warren Cuccurullo; Simon Le Bon; Nick Rhodes; John Taylor	5:31
5.	"Cayendo"	Christopher Breaux	4:33
6.	"Torno Bambina"	Maria Carli; Silvano Polidori	4:11
7.	"Mad World"	Roland Orzabal
Total length:			29:54

== Personnel ==
Credits are adapted from Tidal.

- Tina Arena – vocals, production
- François Tétaz – production, engineering, mixing (all tracks); synthesizer (tracks 1–3, 5, 6), Rhodes (1–3), prepared piano (3, 4), drum machine (3), celesta (4), vocal programming (5)
- Luke Howard – production, engineering (all tracks); piano (1, 3–5), synthesizer (1, 3, 5, 6), organ (1, 5, 6), prepared piano (2, 4), Rhodes (3)
- Lachlan Carrick – mastering
- James Rushford – organ (2–5)
- Peter Knight – programming, trumpet (2)
- Felix Watson – orchestration (3, 4, 6)
- Budapest Art Orchestra – strings (3, 4, 6)
- Anna Pokorny – cello (3, 4, 6)
- Ben Hanlon – double bass (3, 4, 6)
- Merewyn Bramble – viola (3, 4, 6)
- Erkki Veltheim – violin (3, 4, 6)
- Lucy Warren – violin (3, 4, 6)
- Meilna van Leeuwen – harp (4)
- Mindy Meng Wang – guzheng (5)

== Charts ==
Chart performance for Way of the World
Chart (2026)	Peak position
Australian Albums (ARIA)	11
