= Every Mile, Every Mother =

Every Mile, Every Mother is a short documentary film directed by Christy Turlington Burns and produced by Clancy McCarty, in partnership with the denim clothing company Citizens of Humanity, on the subject of long-distance running and motherhood. The film runs to a 15 minutes duration.

Turlington-Burns had originally had the idea of long-distance running as a metaphor of the experiences of pregnancy, being in labour and giving birth, while training for the NY marathon. To promote the cause of her charity Every Mother Counts, the film was made to indicate the problem of the too great distance some women must journey in order to gain the benefit of maternity care.

Images in the film show Turlington Burns and others involved in her charity running as participants of the Hood to Coast relay race, and members of the charity training people studying to become midwives in Haiti. The charity was offered places in the race by CrowdRise.

Soho house, New York city showed the debut of the film to a private audience, Oiselle, a female running clothing company and the official apparel sponsor of Every Mother Counts, hosted a screening of the film on 5 August 2014. London's Ham Yard hotel gave a showing on 22 April 2015.
