= James Hogue =

American impostor (born 1959)

James Arthur Hogue
- Born: October 22, 1959 (age 66); Kansas City, Kansas
- Other names: Jay Mitchell Huntsman; Alexi Indris-Santana
- Education: University of Texas at Austin, University of Wyoming, Princeton University
- Occupation: Con man
- Known for: Entering Princeton University under a false identity.

James Arthur Hogue (born October 22, 1959) is an American impostor who most famously entered Princeton University by posing as a self-taught orphan.

== Early life ==
Hogue was raised in a working-class family in Kansas City, Kansas, and graduated from Washington High School in 1977.

Hogue attended the University of Texas at Austin in the 1980s, but left without a degree. He also attended community college. In the late 1970s, he was a student at the University of Wyoming before dropping out when he did not perform well on the cross country team.

== Criminal career ==
In September 1985, Hogue, now 25 years old, stole the identity of a deceased infant and enrolled as a student at Palo Alto High School as Jay Mitchell Huntsman, a 16-year-old orphan from Nevada. On October 7, 1985, Hogue entered the Stanford Invitational Cross Country Meet. Hogue ran far ahead of the field and won the race, but did not report to the officials' table, arousing suspicion. Due to his mysterious background and physical prowess, local sports reporters dubbed him the "Mystery Boy". Jason Cole, a reporter covering the event for the now-defunct Peninsula Times Tribune, uncovered Hogue's identity theft, and Hogue left town.

In 1987, Hogue applied to Princeton University, using the alias Alexi Indris-Santana, a self-taught orphan from Utah, where he was then living. Hogue's application materials claimed that he had lived outdoors in the Grand Canyon, raising sheep and reading philosophy books. Princeton invited Hogue to attend in the fall of 1988, but he deferred admission for one year, telling Princeton his mother was dying. In reality, Hogue had pled guilty to possessing stolen bicycle equipment, and had been sentenced to five years in prison.

Hogue served nine months before being paroled from Utah State Prison in March 1989. Having also received a financial aid award from Princeton, he immediately left for the college, in violation of the terms of his parole. For the next two years, he lived as Santana, was a member of the track team, and was admitted into the Ivy Club, one of Princeton's most exclusive eating clubs.

His real identity was exposed when Renee Pacheco, a former classmate from his days as "Jay Huntsman" at Palo Alto High School, recognized him. She contacted reporter Jason Cole, who exposed Hogue a second time. On February 26, 1991, Hogue was arrested in class and charged with forgery, theft, and falsifying records. In October 1992, Hogue pled guilty to third-degree theft for taking more than $22,000 in scholarship money and was sentenced to nine months in jail. Hogue served 134 days in jail.

At some point in 1992, Hogue was briefly employed by the Harvard Mineralogical Museum in Cambridge, Massachusetts, as a part-time cataloguer. At the time, Hogue was taking a course in mineralogy at the Harvard Extension School. In April 1993, the museum discovered that gems, mineral specimens, microscopes, and other items worth $50,000 had disappeared, and suspected Hogue as the result of a tip.

On May 10, 1993, police arrested Hogue in Somerville, Massachusetts, and charged him with grand larceny. On May 26, 1993, Harvard police returned to Hogue's Somerville apartment and recovered $600 in electronic equipment reported stolen from a New Jersey electronics firm where Hogue worked in the summer of 1992. In June 1993, Hogue was charged with two counts of larceny and one count of receiving stolen property by the Middlesex County District Attorney's Office. Hogue's theft was one of the largest in the history of the Harvard University Police Department.

Hogue violated the conditions of his parole by returning to Princeton and hanging around the campus using the name Jim MacAuthor; he had not officially enrolled, but had attended social functions and eaten in the cafeteria. After a graduate student recognized him, he was arrested on February 19, 1996, and taken into custody by the Princeton Borough Police – who later released him on his own recognizance. He was later incarcerated in the Mercer County Correctional Center on a conviction for defiant trespass.

Hogue was released from prison in 1997 and vanished from the public eye. Between 1997 and 2003, Hogue was arrested at least twice for theft.

In January, 2005, police with a warrant searched Hogue's home in San Miguel County, Colorado, finding 7,000 items, worth over $100,000, stolen from nearby homes where Hogue had worked as a remodeller and repairman. The stolen goods "packed his house and a small secret compartment he'd built." He was apprehended in Tucson, Arizona, on February 4, 2006, by Deputy United States Marshal Richard J. Tracy Jr. and deputies from the Pima County, Arizona, Sheriff's department while Hogue was sitting in a Barnes & Noble cafe, surfing the internet.

On March 12, 2007, Hogue pled guilty to theft, in return for limiting his sentence and dropping additional charges. He was released on probation in 2012.

On November 3, 2016, Hogue was arrested in Aspen on a misdemeanor theft warrant from Boulder County, Colorado. Aspen police discovered Hogue living in an illegally constructed, camouflaged shack on Aspen Mountain, and possibly in the midst of building a second illegal structure on the mountain. Hogue gave a false name when apprehended and may be charged with criminal impersonation.

== In popular media ==
In 1999, filmmaker Jesse Moss tracked Hogue down in Aspen, Colorado, to interview him for a documentary. Moss was a student at Palo Alto High School when Hogue enrolled as a student using a false name. The completed film, entitled Con Man, was released in 2003.

== See also ==
- Academic dishonesty
- 2019 college admissions bribery scandal
- Adam Wheeler fraud case

== Literature ==
- Samuels, David (2008). The Runner: A True Account of the Amazing Lies and Fantastical Adventures of the Ivy League Impostor James Hogue. New Press. ISBN 9781595581884.
