= Every Mother Counts (album) =

2011 compilation album by various artists

Compilation album by various artists
- Released: April 12, 2011
- Label: Hear Music
- Producer: Christy Turlington (co-producer)

Every Mother Counts chronology
Every Mother Counts (2011)	Every Mother Counts 2012 (2012)

Every Mother Counts (sometimes subtitled "Songs Inspired by the Documentary 'No Woman, No Cry' Directed by Christy Turlington Burns") is a charity compilation album and soundtrack for Christy Turlington's 2010 documentary film No Woman, No Cry by various artists, released by Starbucks' record label Hear Music on April 12, 2011. Featuring fifteen tracks about motherhood, some of which are original and previously unreleased, the compilation was sold exclusively at Starbucks locations and benefited the CARE's maternal health initiatives and the Every Mother Counts foundation. The album debuted at number 83 on the Billboard 200.

== Background and release ==
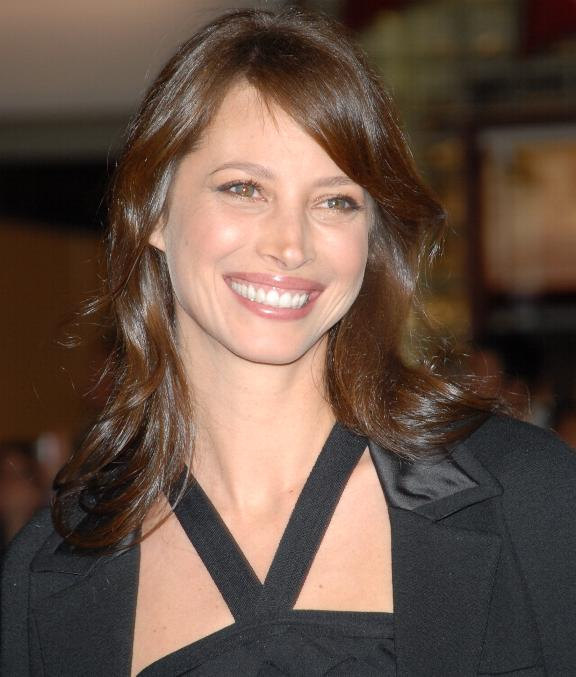
Christy Turlington, 2008

Every Mother Counts was released by Starbucks' retail music concept and record label Hear Music in 2011. The collection serves as a companion piece to Christy Turlington's documentary film No Woman, No Cry (2010), which follows four expectant mothers in Bangladesh, Guatemala, Tanzania, and the United States, and the healthcare challenges they encounter. The album is the first in Starbucks' series of the same name; Every Mother Counts 2012 was released the following year.

Starbucks founder Howard Schultz reached out to Turlington to support her foundation Every Mother Counts, which seeks to make pregnancy and childbirth safe for mothers. David Legry, who served as Starbucks' editorial manager, helped shape the compilation after reading about Turlington's humanitarian work, and later worked with artists to select suitable songs. Turlington then recruited several artists, including: Carla Bruni, Sheryl Crow, Jennifer Lopez, Madonna, her friend Gwyneth Paltrow, and Martha Wainwright, to contribute to the project. She contacted all participating artists, and recalled:

We already had our soundtrack, and I already had Martha Wainwright singing "No Woman, No Cry," which was great, but it got us all thinking that a compilation CD would be a great way to target women who are artists and also mothers and see what they're willing to contribute. So I wrote some letters and spoke to a few of the women that are on the CD, and threw the idea out and pretty much everybody that we went to is on this list and said yes and was really excited.

The compilation was available only at Starbucks locations between April 12 and May 9, the day after Mother's Day. Eight dollars from each sale between April 12 and May 9 benefited the humanitarian organization CARE and its "maternal health programs in coffee growing countries", and the Every Mother Counts foundation.

== Composition ==
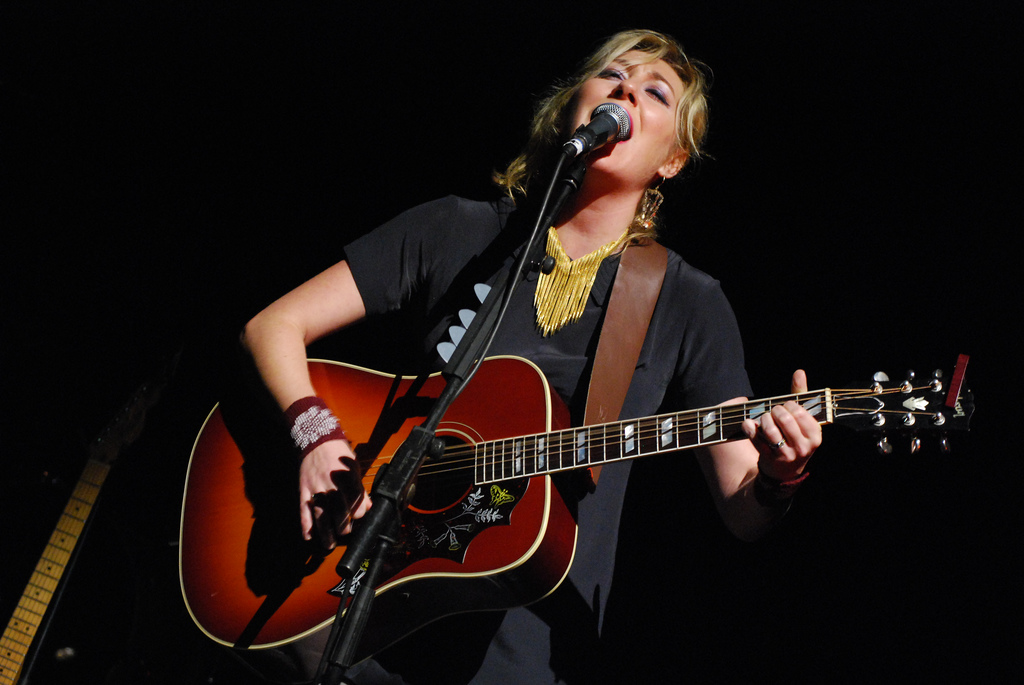
Martha Wainwright opens and closes the album with "Leave Behind" and "No Woman, No Cry", respectively. She also served as music supervisor and composer for Turlington's documentary film No Woman, No Cry.

Every Mother Counts is a compilation album and film soundtrack "loosely" curated by Starbucks and co-produced by Turlington, featuring fifteen tracks about motherhood by various artists, fourteen of whom are mothers. Some tracks are original and previously unreleased, including Patti Scialfa's "Children's Song".

The album opens with "Leave Behind" by Martha Wainwright, who also served as music supervisor and composer for the film No Woman, No Cry. Turlington and a pregnant Wainwright met at a United Nations-sponsored dinner in 2009; Wainwright and her mother, Kate McGarrigle, both suffered from difficult birthing experiences, inspiring Wainwright to contribute to the project. Bruni performs "Le Loup, la Biche et le Chevalier (Une Chanson Douce)", which was originally composed and performed by French Caribbean singer Henri Salvador.

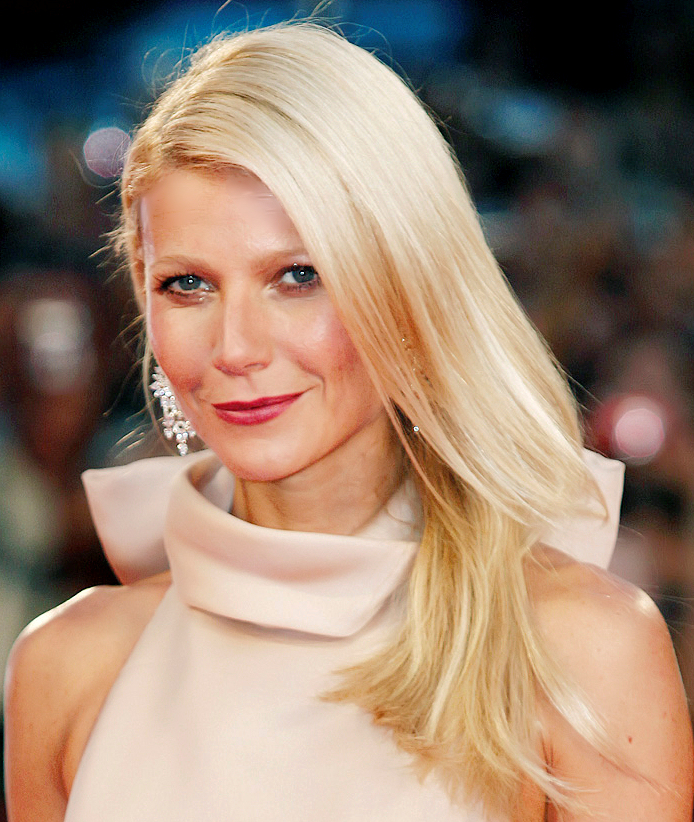
The album features Turlington's friend Gwyneth Paltrow (pictured in 2011) performing Kate Bush's "This Woman's Work" (1988).

Following this are "This Woman's Work" (Kate Bush, 1988), performed by Paltrow, Madonna's "Promise to Try", and Scialfa's previously unreleased song, which features her husband Bruce Springsteen. Despite providing vocals and recording assistance, Springsteen is not credited on the album in order to keep its focus on the featured mothers. Scialfa re-wrote a song she had written when the couple's children were very young because she thought the original version did not "[suit] her voice". The duo recorded the album version, which Rolling Stone described as a "lilting, down-tempo ballad", in their home studio with additional assistance from producer Ron Anielo. "There and Back Again, Pt. 2" is performed by Bernice Johnson Reagon and Toshi Reagon, and is followed by Angélique Kidjo's "Sweet Lullaby" and a remixed version of Ani DiFranco's "Present/Infant".

The ninth and tenth tracks are "Lullaby", performed by the Dixie Chicks, and Rosanne Cash's acoustic version of "Motherless Children" (1927), a blues standard originally recorded by Blind Willie Johnson. Following are Crow's "Lullaby for Wyatt", Lopez's "One Step at a Time", and "The Last Laugh" by Karen Elson. Closing the album are "Petit Poulet", performed by Sinéad O'Connor, and Wainwright's cover of Bob Marley and the Wailers' "No Woman, No Cry". Wainwright recorded both of her tracks weeks after giving birth prematurely, while her baby was still in an incubator.

== Track listing ==
1. "Leave Behind", performed by Martha Wainwright
2. "Le Loup, la Biche et le Chevalier (Une Chanson Douce)", performed by Carla Bruni
3. "This Woman's Work" (Kate Bush), performed by Gwyneth Paltrow
4. "Promise to Try", performed by Madonna
5. "Children's Song", performed by Patti Scialfa featuring Bruce Springsteen
6. "There and Back Again, Pt. 2", performed by Bernice Johnson Reagon and Toshi Reagon
7. "Sweet Lullaby", performed by Angélique Kidjo
8. "Present/Infant [Remix]", performed by Ani DiFranco
9. "Lullaby", performed by Dixie Chicks
10. "Motherless Children [Acoustic]", performed by Rosanne Cash
11. "Lullaby for Wyatt", performed by Sheryl Crow
12. "One Step at a Time", performed by Jennifer Lopez
13. "The Last Laugh", performed by Karen Elson
14. "Petit Poulet", performed by Sinéad O'Connor
15. "No Woman, No Cry" (Vincent Ford, Bob Marley), performed by Martha Wainwright

Track listing adapted from AllMusic.

== Charts ==
The album debuted at number 83 on the Billboard 200.

Chart (2011)	Peak position
United States (Billboard 200)	83

== See also ==
- Women in music
