= War Game (2024 film) =

2024 documentary film

- Film poster
- Directed by: Jesse Moss; Tony Gerber
- Produced by: Todd Lubin; Jesse Moss; Jack Turner; Mark DiCristofaro; Jessica Grimshaw; Nick Shumaker
- Cinematography: Thorsten Thielow; Wolfgang Held; Daniel Carter; Tim Grucza; Brett Wiley; Keri Oberly
- Edited by: Jeff Gilbert
- Music by: Paweł Mykietyn
- Production companies: Boat Rocker Studios; Matador Content; Anonymous Content
- Distributed by: Submarine Deluxe
- Release date: August 2, 2024 (New York)
- Running time: 94 minutes
- Country: United States
- Language: English
- Box office: $111,088

War Game is a 2024 American film directed by Jesse Moss and Tony Gerber. It is about American officials simulating a coup after a disputed election. The film premiered at the 2024 Sundance Film Festival and was released in New York on August 2, 2024.

== Cast ==
- Ralph Brown as Lieutenant General Roger Simms
- Chris Henry Coffey as Gov. Robert Strickland
- Frederick Wellman as Red Cell Operative
- Alexander Vindman as Game Consultant
- Steve Bullock as President John Hotham
- Gary Perez as Lieutenant General Gabriel King
- Wesley Clark as Chairman of the Joint Chiefs of Staff
- Heidi Heitkamp as Senior Advisor to the President
- Doug Jones as Attorney General
- Bill Kristol as Red Cell Operative
- Kristofer Goldsmith as Red Cell Leader
- Janessa Goldbeck as Game Producer

== Reception ==
On the review aggregator website Rotten Tomatoes, 80% of 45 critics' reviews are positive, with an average rating of 7.2/10. The website's consensus reads: "A creative exercise of deadly serious import, War Game is an involving feat of simulation that sounds the alarm." Metacritic, which uses a weighted average, assigned the film a score of 71 out of 100, based on 10 critics, indicating "generally favorable" reviews.
