= Every Mother Counts 2012 =

2012 compilation album by various artists

Compilation album by various artists
- Released: May 1, 2012
- Length: 69:38
- Label: Hear Music

Every Mother Counts chronology
Every Mother Counts (2011)	Every Mother Counts 2012 (2012)

Every Mother Counts 2012 is the second compilation album in Starbucks' annual series, released by Hear Music on May 1, 2012. Featuring thirteen previously unavailable tracks, the album was sold exclusively at Starbucks locations and benefited Christy Turlington's Every Mother Counts foundation, which seeks to increase childbirth safety for mothers. The compilation received a positive critical reception.

== Background and release ==
Every Mother Counts 2012 is the second album in Starbucks' annual series (following the 2011 album of the same name), released by its retail music concept and record label Hear Music. The album was available only at Starbucks locations in the United States and Canada between May 1 and 29, in celebration of Mother's Day. Eight dollars from each twelve dollar album sale benefited Christy Turlington's foundation of the same name, which seeks to make pregnancy and childbirth safe for mothers.

== Composition ==
The compilation album includes 19 songs by various artists. Thirteen of the tracks were previously unreleased; the six existing recordings were: "Wish for You" by Faith Hill, Sade's "The Sweetest Gift", "I Remember" by Lauryn Hill, Seal's "Secret", "Fragilidad" (1988) by Sting, and David Bowie's "Everyone Says 'Hi'". Turlington said of the album:

I went to friends first, as I did with the first CD. Bono and Chris Martin were great supporters of the project the first time around, and when I knew I wanted to include men on this album they were obvious choices. They are also both fathers to daughters. Others, such as Patti Smith and Rita Wilson, I've known for a long time, and some, like Edie Brickell and Paul Simon, I only met briefly but was a huge admirer. I generally wanted a diverse group of artists who were parents, or in the case of Edward Sharpe, who will be soon. We wanted to reach a broad audience on this issue with this particular project and with a range of perspectives.

=== Songs ===
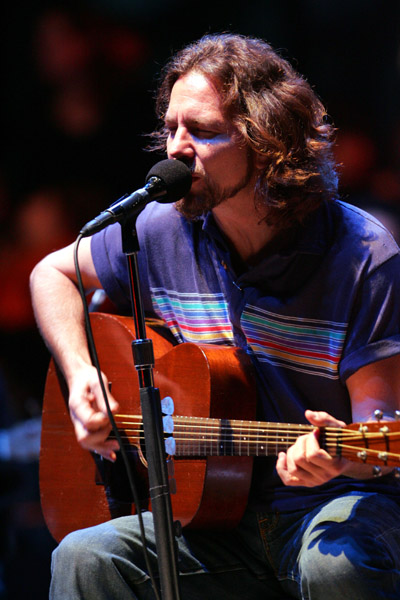
Eddie Vedder's (pictured in 2006) daughter Olivia appears on the ballad "Skipping".

The album opens with Bono and The Edge's acoustic "Original of the Species" (2004). Turlington said of the track: "Bono wrote the song with his daughters in mind. It's wishful and imparts the idea that, 'I'm here and I'm watching you take your steps forward and I'm supporting your independence, but at the same time, I don't want you to make mistakes.' Any parent can relate to that." The song is followed by Eddie Vedder's acoustic ballad "Skipping", which he wrote as a tribute to his children and features his daughter Olivia's (age 6) voice at the start of the track, saying "check, check" and "daddy, daddy". Turlington said of Vedder's involvement:

Eddie was amazing to accept this project while in the midst of so much. I spoke to him and exchanged several emails about his contribution. "Skipping" is such a sweet song and I just love that his daughter Olivia has a little cameo at the start. He once wrote me saying that his girls would be proud one day that their dad contributed to such a meaningful project.

The third track is "Pretty Day", performed by Brickell and Simon. Following it are three previously released recordings by Faith Hill, Sade, and Lauryn Hill. The seventh and eighth songs are "Baby I'm Yours" by Wilson, and "Don't Fence Me In", performed by Diana Krall, followed by Seal's previously available recording. The tenth and eleventh tracks are a live rendition of "Sister" by Dave Matthews Band and Sting's previously available song, respectively.

Following these are Alanis Morissette's "Magical Child", which was written as a tribute to her son, Edward Sharpe and the Magnetic Zeros' "Mother", and Bowie's previously released recording. "Mother" features music put to a poem written by Alex Ebert; the band recorded a music video for the song, which The Huffington Post described as having an "almost hypnotic" groove with a "late-1960s/early-1970s psychedelic vibe".

The next tracks are a "flute-inflected" version of "Get Up Stand Up" by Cedella Marley, Beck's "Corrina, Corrina" (1928), a traditional folk song most notably covered by Bob Dylan, and "Instead of the Dead" by Rufus Wainwright. The album's final tracks are Smith's "Somalia" and an acoustic rendition of "Yellow" (2000) by Coldplay. Turlington said of "Somalia":

Patti told me she wrote this song years ago, after seeing a segment on the news in which a child literally died in the arms of its mother. That memory was still very present to her in 2011 during the crisis in the Horn of Africa, so she thought, "If I could give this mother what I have — fruit on the trees, a healthy child — I would." She went into the studio and brought along her daughter, who's now grown and married, to play piano, and gave us this version of the song.

== Reception ==
The album, and Vedder's "Skipping" in particular, received positive reception. In May 2012, "Skipping" was one of The Globe and Mail's "songs you need to hear this week", in the pop category. The newspaper's Brad Wheeler called the album "mom-friendly tuneage" and Vedder's track a "heartfelt", "sweet" song with a "cute" contribution from his daughter. Writing for The Huffington Post, music journalist Kristi York Wooten said, "Each song is a gift from the artists, given in honor of mothers everywhere". She offered commentary on select tracks, including "Skipping" (the "sentiment about the unique bond between a parent and child transcends both gender and time"), and "Pretty Day", which she said "might get you singing along instantly". Wooten called Beck's contribution "thematically coherent and stylistically diverse", and Smith's track "arresting", "reflective and beautiful".

== Track listing ==
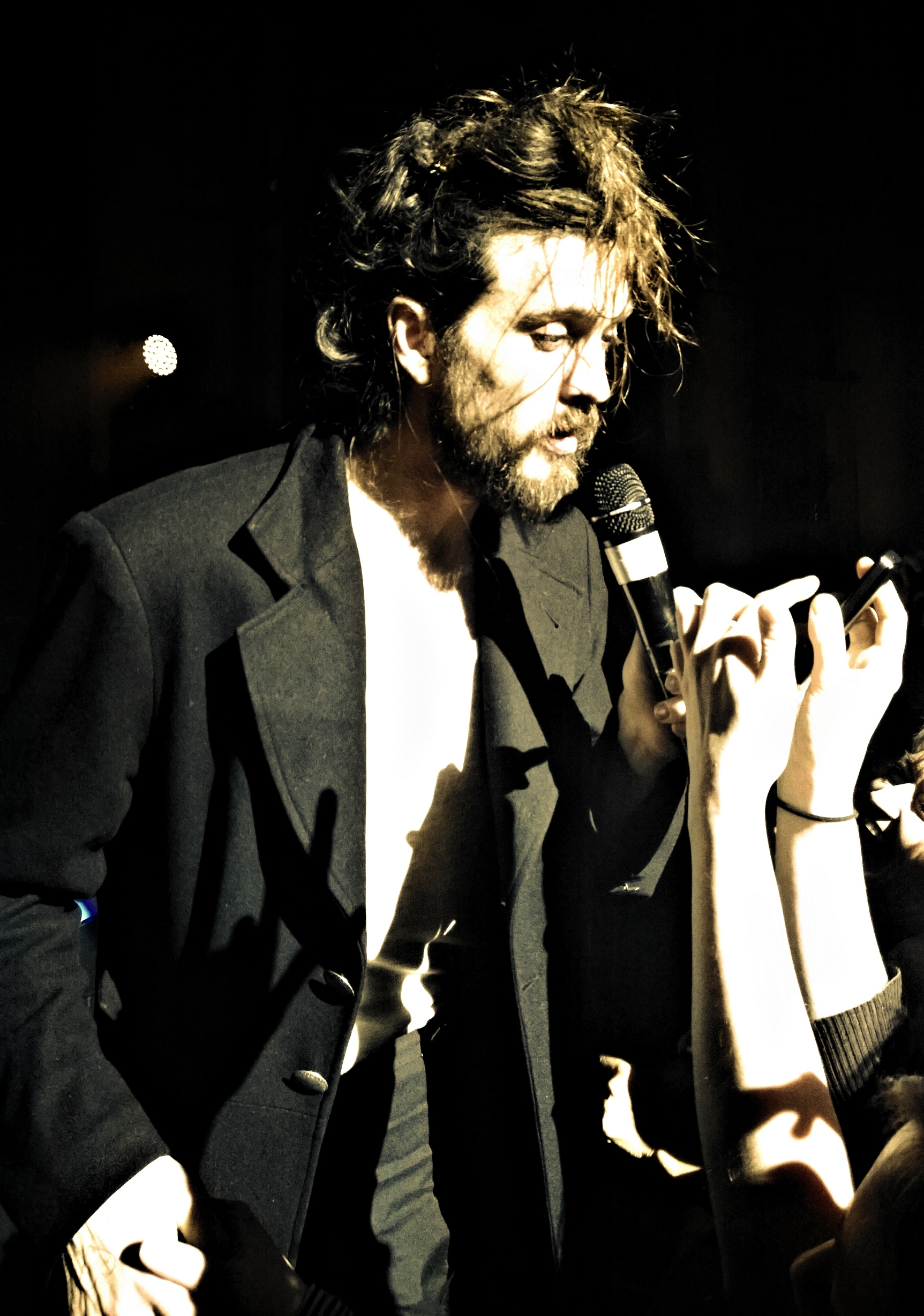
"Mother" was written by Edward Sharpe and the Magnetic Zeros' Alex Ebert.

1. "Original of the Species" (lyrics by Bono, music by U2), performed by Bono and The Edge – 4:02
2. "Skipping", performed by Eddie Vedder – 3:45
3. "Pretty Day", performed by Edie Brickell and Paul Simon – 2:18
4. "Wish for You", performed by Faith Hill – 3:25
5. "The Sweetest Gift", performed by Sade – 2:19
6. "I Remember", performed by Lauryn Hill – 3:47
7. "Baby I'm Yours", performed by Rita Wilson – 2:51
8. "Don't Fence Me In", performed by Diana Krall – 3:36
9. "Secret", performed by Seal – 3:21
10. "Sister [Live]", performed by Dave Matthews Band – 3:39
11. "Fragilidad" (Sting), performed by Sting – 3:53
12. "Magical Child", performed by Alanis Morissette – 4:52
13. "Mother" (Alex Ebert), performed by Edward Sharpe and the Magnetic Zeros – 3:47
14. "Everyone Says 'Hi'" (David Bowie), performed by David Bowie – 4:00
15. "Get Up Stand Up" (Bob Marley, Peter Tosh), performed by Cedella Marley – 3:40
16. "Corrina, Corrina", performed by Beck – 2:47
17. "Instead of the Dead", performed by Rufus Wainwright – 5:03
18. "Somalia", performed by Patti Smith – 4:18
19. "Yellow [Acoustic Version]" (Chris Martin, Jonny Buckland, Guy Berryman, Will Champion), performed by Coldplay – 4:15

Track listing adapted from AllMusic.
