= Full Battle Rattle =

2008 American war documentary film by Jesse Moss and Tony Gerber

- Directed by: Jesse Moss; Tony Gerber
- Produced by: Jesse Moss; Tony Gerber
- Music by: Paul Brill
- Release date: 2008 (Berlinale)
- Running time: 95 minutes

Full Battle Rattle is a 2008 American war documentary film directed by Jesse Moss and Tony Gerber.

== Plot ==
The film is about the war simulation in the fictional Iraqi town of Medina Wasl that the US Army built in the Mojave Desert, which is used to help train its army units before they deploy to Iraq.

== Production ==
The pair were granted permission to live inside the simulation for the duration of a three-week training rotation. Moss and Gerber filmed on both sides of the “war”: Gerber lived with the Army Brigade in training and Moss lived in Medina Wasl. The duo used war films such as Three Kings, Hearts and Minds, and Coming Home along with the works of Robert Altman as references when developing the film.

== Release ==
Full Battle Rattle made its world premiere at the 2008 Berlin International Film Festival.

== Reception ==
Review aggregator Rotten Tomatoes reports an approval rating of 77% based on 31 reviews, with an average rating of 6.5/10. The website's critics consensus reads: "Full Battle Rattle is an insightful, eye-opening account of the preparations soldiers must make for their service in Iraq."

David Edelstein of New York magazine called the film “an indelible vision of modern war”. A. O. Scott of The New York Times wrote: “Remarkably thorough and detailed. The film emphasizes the strangeness and complexity of the conflict.”

It won the Special Jury Prize at the 2008 SXSW Film Festival.
