= Tony Gerber =

American filmmaker

- Born: New York City, New York, U.S.
- Occupation: Filmmaker
- Spouse: Lynn Nottage
- Children: 2

Tony Gerber is an American filmmaker and the co-founder of Market Road Films, an independent production company.

== Personal life ==
Gerber was born in New York City. He is a 1981 graduate of the Hackley School, and a 1995 graduate of the Columbia University School of the Arts. He lives in Brooklyn, New York with his wife, playwright Lynn Nottage, and their two children, Ruby and Melkamu Gerber.

== Career ==
Gerber is a two-time Emmy winner.

He directed and executive produced Kingdom of the White Wolf, a three-part natural history series for National Geographic, filmed on location in the High Arctic.

He is a producer of Jane, a 2017 film about the life and work of Dr. Jane Goodall.

For CNN Films he directed, and co-wrote with Meryl Streep, We Will Rise chronicling former First Lady Michelle Obama’s trip to Africa to raise awareness of the importance of girl’s education which won an American Television Academy Honor and a CINE Golden Eagle.

His independent films include Full Battle Rattle (Berlinale premiere and SXSW Special Jury Prize) and The Notorious Mr. Bout (Sundance premiere).

In 2005, Gerber co-founded NY-based production company, Market Road Films with playwright Lynn Nottage. Nottage and Gerber are currently developing a feature film, Everlasting Yea! for Amazon Studios and were executive producers of Unfinished: Deep South, a 2020 10-part Peabody-nominated podcast for Stitcher, investigating an unsolved 1950s lynching and the conspiracy of silence in a small southern town.

Gerber is an instructor at the New York Film Academy. He is a member of the Academy of Motion Picture Arts and Sciences.

== Works ==
Feature films

- Side Streets (1998)
- Full Battle Rattle (2008)
- Notorious Mr. Bout (2014)
- We Will Rise: Michelle Obama's Mission to Educate Girls Around the World (2016)
- Jane (2017) – producer
- War Game (2024)

Short films

- QM, I Think I Call Her QM (1999)
- A Small Taste of Heaven (1997)

Mini-series

- National Geographic Explorer (TV series documentary)
  - Congo Bush Pilots (2008)
  - Science of Evil (2008)
  - Secret History of Diamonds (2009)
  - Man vs. Volcano (2010)
  - Inside the DEA (2010)
  - Kingdom of the White Wolf (2019)

Museum works

- How to Move a Landscape film (2020)
- The Bell, the Digger, and the Tropical Pharmacy (2014)
