= Christy Turlington =

American model (born 1969)

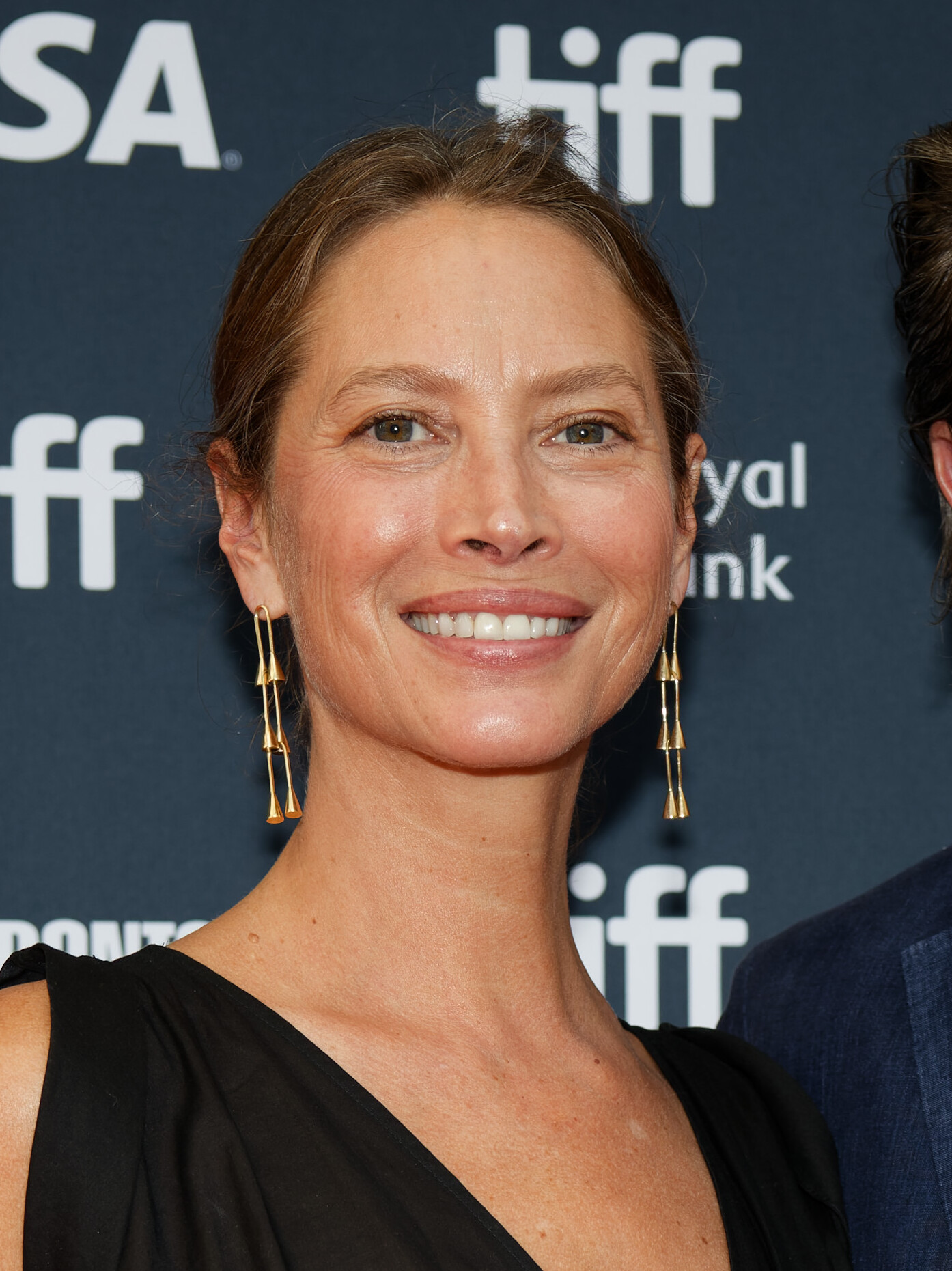
- Turlington in 2024
- Born: Christy Nicole Turlington; January 2, 1969 (age 57); Walnut Creek, California, U.S.
- Other name: Christy Burns
- Education: New York University (BA)
- Years active: 1983–present
- Spouse: Edward Burns (m. 2003)
- Children: 2
- Modeling information
- Height: 5 ft 10 in (1.78 m)
- Hair color: Brown
- Eye color: Green

Christy Nicole Turlington Burns (née Turlington; born January 2, 1969) is an American fashion model. She first gained fame in the late 1980s and early 1990s as a supermodel. She represented Calvin Klein's Eternity campaign in 1989 and again in 2014, and also represents Maybelline. Grace Coddington, the long-time creative director of American Vogue magazine, has described Turlington as "the most beautiful woman in the world."

== Early life ==
Turlington was born in Walnut Creek, California, the middle of three daughters born to Dwain Turlington, a pilot for Pan Am, and María Elizabeth (née Parker Infante), a flight attendant from El Salvador. She was raised in the Catholic faith of her mother along with her sisters and continued to practice the religion into adulthood.

She was discovered by local photographer Dennie Cody while she was riding a horse in Miami, Florida, where her father was working as a training captain for Pan Am. Turlington began modeling after school from age 14 to 16 and during summers while she attended Monte Vista High School in Danville, California.

After turning 18, she moved to New York City to model full-time, and later graduated from high school. She went back to school in 1994 and graduated cum laude in 1999 from the Gallatin School of Individualized Study of New York University, where she earned a Bachelor of Arts degree with a concentration in comparative religion and eastern philosophy. As of 2014, she was a student at the Columbia University Mailman School of Public Health.

== Modeling ==
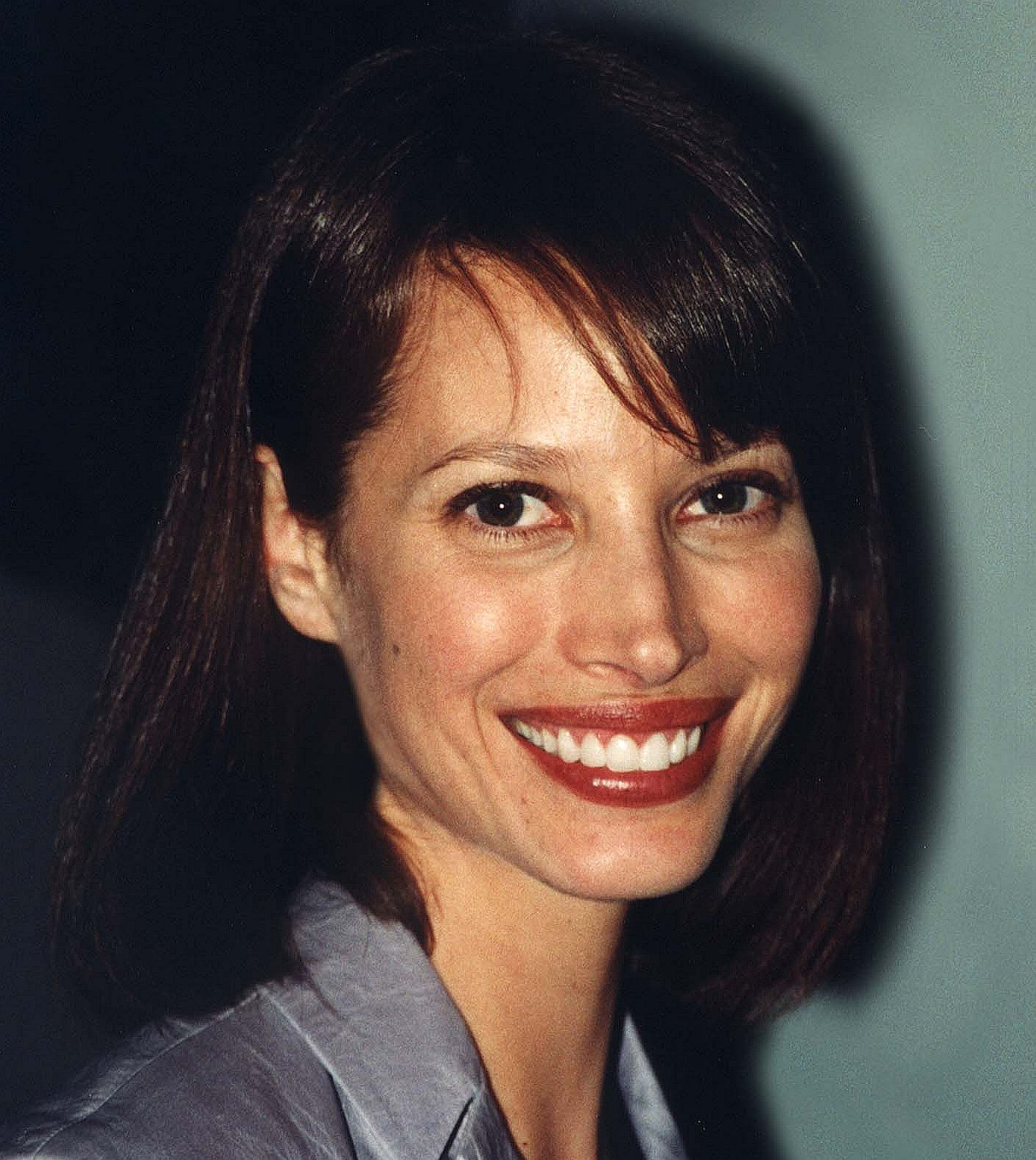
Turlington in 2000

=== 20th century ===
Turlington has been featured in advertising campaigns for Calvin Klein, Chanel, Yves Saint Laurent, Marc Jacobs, Donna Karan, Prada, Valentino, Versace, Louis Vuitton, Bally, Jason Wu, Max Mara, Escada, Michael Kors, and Maybelline.

At age 20, she signed a record-breaking million-dollar contract as the new face of Calvin Klein (1989–2007). In 1992, she also became the face of Maybelline. The following year, the Metropolitan Museum of Art in New York named her the "Face of the 20th Century" and created a line of mannequins based on her likeness.

She also appeared in two music videos. Fellow model Yasmin Le Bon got her husband Simon Le Bon of Duran Duran to feature Turlington in their "Notorious" video and album cover in 1986, at the age of 17. During the 1990s, she appeared in Unzipped, a documentary about fashion designer Isaac Mizrahi, and the fashion mockumentary film Prêt-à-Porter by director Robert Altman. Additionally, she was featured in Catwalk, a documentary about her life on the fashion runways by director Robert Leacock.

Christy Turlington is widely regarded as one of the "original supermodels" of the late 1980s and early 1990s, a group of models who achieved global fame and recognition beyond the fashion industry. Alongside Naomi Campbell and Linda Evangelista, she is often referred to as part of the “Holy Trinity” of supermodels. The three became closely associated through their frequent appearances in major fashion campaigns, magazine covers, and runway shows, helping define the era and elevating the status of models to that of international celebrities.

Turlington has appeared on international fashion magazines that include Vogue, Harper's Bazaar, Elle, Marie Claire, L'Officiel, Tatler, Glamour, Cosmopolitan and Allure. In 1990, singer George Michael drew inspiration from Peter Lindbergh's January 1990 British Vogue cover (which features Turlington, Campbell, Linda Evangelista, Cindy Crawford, and Tatjana Patitz) for his "Freedom!" video. The video featured all top 5 female models along with their top 5 male counterparts, lip-syncing the song. The video was shown during George Michael's 2008 concert tour while he sang.

She was added on as the fourth model investor, after Elle Macpherson, Naomi Campbell and Claudia Schiffer of the now defunct Fashion Cafes. Turlington has also been credited along with Alicia Silverstone with introducing the navel piercing to mainstream culture after she and Naomi Campbell got their navels piercing together before baring their piercings at a London fashion show in 1993.

=== Later work ===
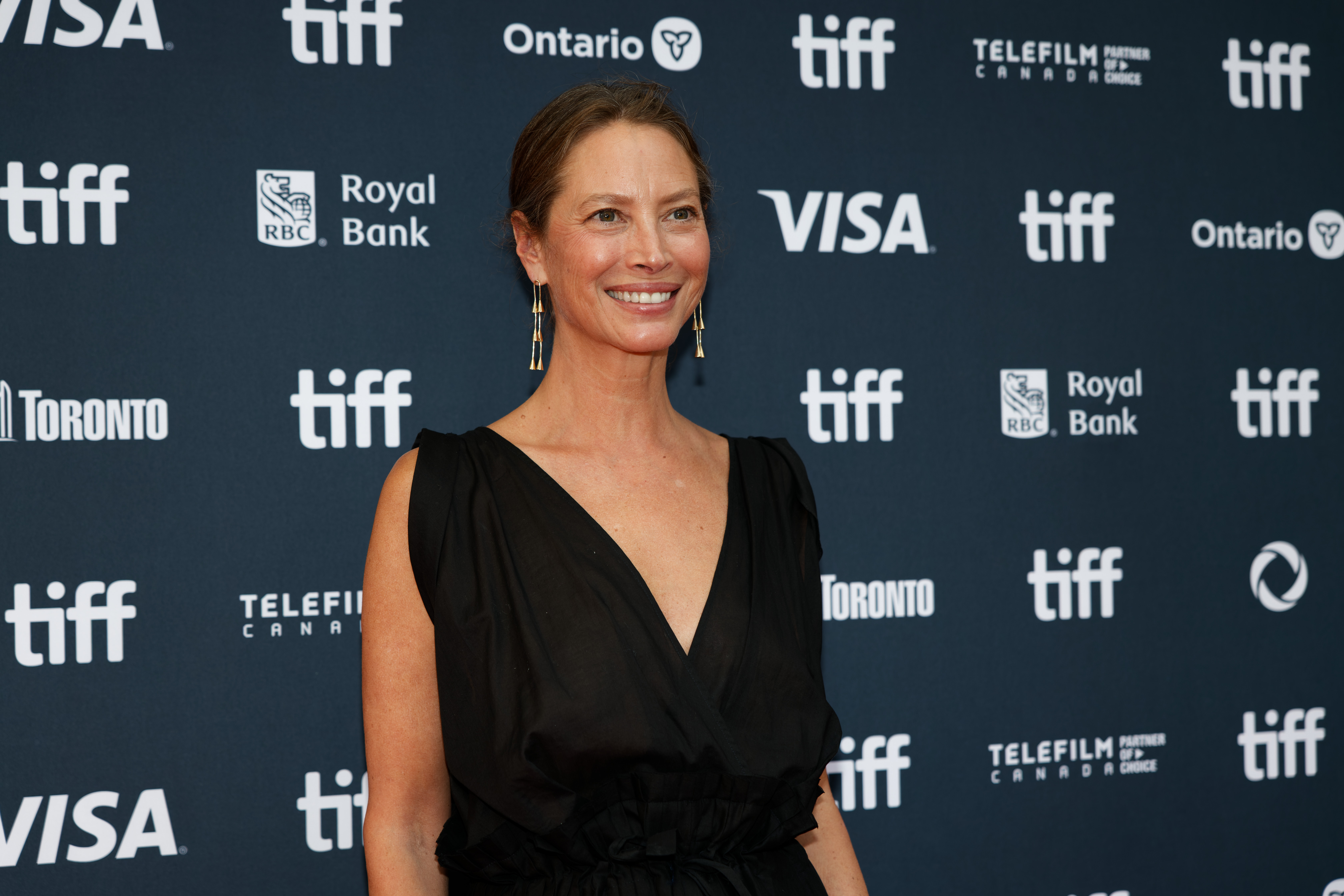
Turlington at the 2024 Toronto International Film Festival

In honor of Turlington's 40th birthday, W magazine put together a collection of significant images from her career, runway shots from the late eighties to today. In 2008, casting agent James Scully said regarding Turlington:

The greatest model of all time! You could combine every model to this day into one person, and they wouldn't come close (sorry, girls). Probably the biggest crush I've ever had on a girl. It would be a dream to have the opportunity of working with her on a show again before I retire, but that seems about as likely as winning the lottery.

Turlington was one of the faces to land in one of the fourteen covers of V magazine's September 2008 issue. Each cover shows a head shot of a famous model, either from the new crop of leading models or the supermodel era, it was lensed by duo Inez van Lamsweerde and Vinoodh Matadin.

She featured in the Bally spring/summer 2009 campaign alongside Oriol Elcacho.

Turlington Burns closed the Autumn Winter 2019 walk for fashion designer Marc Jacobs.

Turlington is featured in a four-part Apple TV+ docuseries titled The Super Models. Having premiered on September 20, 2023, the series also features Cindy Crawford, Naomi Campbell, and Linda Evangelista and is directed by Roger Ross Williams and Larissa Bills.

In February 2026, Turlington was named a global ambassador for Lancôme, who appointed her due to her "innate femininity, proactive advocacy, and spirited outlook."

== Other ventures ==
In the early 2000s, she became a partner in a variety of business ventures: an ayurvedic skincare line, Sundari, and two clothing lines produced by Puma, an active women's clothing line; and a women's yoga-wear line.

She has contributed writings to Marie Claire, Yoga Journal, and Teen Vogue along with contributions to the Huffington Post. She has also contributed to NBC's Today Show as a guest correspondent, which included reporting on the status of girl's education in Afghanistan in early 2002 and an interview with H.H. Dalai Lama at his home in Dharamshala, India.

She was also an initial product tester for the Apple Watch launch in 2015, participating in the press conference and allowing them to film a segment featuring her use of the Apple Watch to train for a marathon.

== Humanitarian activities ==
Anti-smoking public service announcement featuring Turlington from 2000

In 2005, Turlington began working with the international humanitarian organization CARE and has since become their Advocate for Maternal Health. She is also an Ambassador for Product Red.

After suffering complications in her own 2003 childbirth, and upon learning that over 500,000 women die each year during childbirth (of which 90% of the deaths are preventable), Turlington was inspired to pursue a master's degree in public health at the Columbia University Mailman School of Public Health.

Turlington visited Swaziland in May 2007 on behalf of Product Red, and El Salvador and Peru in 2005 and 2008, respectively, on behalf of CARE. Her involvement with CARE was influenced by her mother, Elizabeth, who has been a longtime CARE supporter through her former flight attendants' organization, World Wings. The FEMME project, a coming together of CARE, Columbia University, and local government, brings health-care practitioners together to find better methods of serving the large number of women needing assistance who are too intimidated to seek help in a clinic or traditional hospital.

In September 2010, Turlington participated in a CARE Learning Tour to Ethiopia to investigate the work being done to reduce maternal deaths.

Turlington serves on the Harvard Medical School Global Health Council, and as an advisor to the Harvard School of Public Health Board of Dean's Advisors. She is a member of White Ribbon Alliance for Safe Motherhood and Mother's Day Every Day.

=== No Woman, No Cry ===
Turlington made her directorial debut on the 2010 documentary film No Woman, No Cry. The 60 minute documentary profiles the status of maternal health and focuses on four cases: from Tanzania, Bangladesh, Guatemala, and the United States. The film made its world premiere at the 2010 Tribeca Film Festival in the United States, and the U.S. television broadcast premiere aired on the new Oprah Winfrey Network (OWN) on May 7, 2011. The documentary earned Turlington a nomination for the Do Something With Style Award from the VH1 Do Something Awards.

=== Every Mother Counts ===
Concurrent with the debut of her documentary No Woman, No Cry, Turlington launched Every Mother Counts (EMC), a non-profit 501(c)(3) organization dedicated to making pregnancy and childbirth safe for every mother. Every Mother Counts informs, engages, and mobilizes new audiences to take actions and raise funds that support maternal health programs around the world. EMC supports programs in Haiti, Uganda, Malawi, Indonesia, and the United States.

Turlington completed her first New York City Marathon in 2011, running with Team Every Mother Counts to raise awareness for maternal and child health. She also ran the 2013 ING NYC Marathon with Team EMC and 2013 Hood to Coast Relay, which is featured in her documentary film, Every Mile, Every Mother.

The charity released a short film series entitled Giving Birth in America sometime a little before May 2015.

==== Albums ====
Every Mother Counts is a compilation album that was released in 2011 exclusively to Starbucks, with a proportion of the proceeds to be donated to CARE and the Every Mother Counts organisation to support its maternal health care programs in coffee growing countries worldwide.

Every Mother Counts 2012 is a compilation album that was released in 2012 in partnership with Starbucks. U.S. $8 from the sale of each CD in participating Starbucks stores during 2012 is "to be given in support of Every Mother Counts".

=== Other ===
In 2015, Turlington signed an open letter which the ONE Campaign had been collecting signatures for; the letter was addressed to Angela Merkel and Nkosazana Dlamini-Zuma, urging them to focus on women as they serve as the head of the G7 in Germany and the AU in South Africa respectively, which will start to set the priorities in development funding before a main UN summit in September 2015 that will establish new development goals for the generation.

== Honors ==
She was one of fifteen women selected to appear on the cover of the September 2019 issue of British Vogue, by guest editor Meghan, Duchess of Sussex.

== Personal life ==
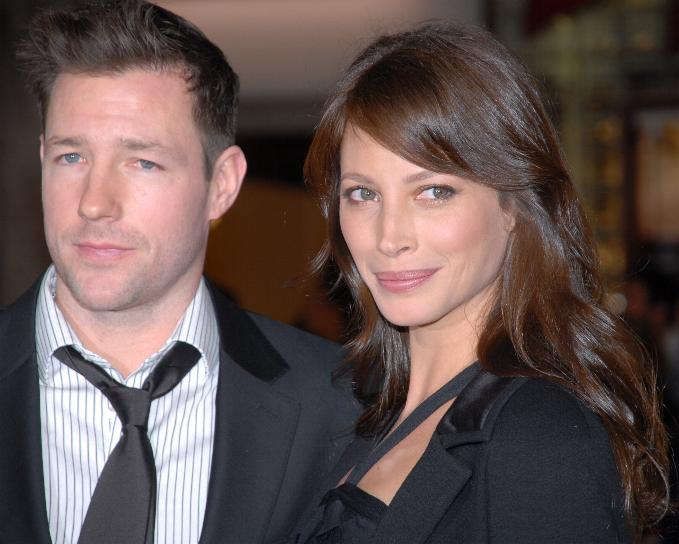
Turlington and husband Edward Burns

Turlington is married to actor and director Edward Burns, with whom she has two children: Grace, born in 2003, and Finn, born in 2006. Turlington's sister Kelly is married to Edward's brother Brian Burns.

Turlington and Burns have expressed different accounts of how they first met. In an interview with HuffPost, Edward Burns said they initially crossed paths when Christy appeared on a taping of Entertainment Tonight, where he was working as a production assistant. According to him, he got her a cup of coffee.

However, in 2020, Turlington shared a different version in an interview with Grazia UK, saying they first met in the late 1990s at a basketball game at Madison Square Garden. At the time, she noted that she was in another relationship, and that their meaningful connection only happened later, when they re-encountered each other at a charity event in 2000.

It was at this charity event that their romantic relationship began to develop. Within about two months, they were engaged, according to Edward Burns in a 2007 interview with Elle. The couple originally planned to marry in October 2001 in Milan, but postponed the wedding following the September 11 attacks.

After a period of separation, they rekindled their relationship in late 2002 and eventually married in June 2003 in San Francisco. Turlington wore a dress by John Galliano.

Rory Evans writes in Cookie magazine,

Contrary to many reports, the U2 frontman and activist [Bono] did not give her away at her wedding. 'He was there, of course, but I gave myself away. I mean, I was 25 weeks pregnant at the time'...acknowledging that her gown, designed by John Galliano, offered the relative disguise of an Empire waist.

She went on to note that Burns, the groom, "met me halfway down the aisle".

An ex-smoker whose father died of lung cancer in 1997, Turlington is an anti-smoking activist. Turlington began smoking at 13 and was smoking a pack a day by age 16. In 1995, at age 26, she quit smoking. In 2000 at age 31, when undergoing a lung scan to raise awareness about medical technology, she was diagnosed with early-stage emphysema.

=== Yoga ===
Turlington is a practitioner of yoga, specifically a type of yoga known as Jivamukti. Turlington has practiced yoga since 1987. Within an article published April 15, 2001, she stated she practiced three times a week, during the morning time. She credits yoga with bringing her closer to her Catholic faith.

She is the author of the book Living Yoga: Creating a Life Practice, first published in 2002, is now within a third edition (2002, 2003, 2005). The 2002 text has a foreword by Robert Thurman. Turlington was involved in the editing of the January–February 2001 edition of Yoga Journal.
