= No Woman, No Cry (film) =

2010 documentary film by Christy Turlington

- Film poster
- Directed by: Christy Turlington
- Produced by: Dallas Brennan Rexer
- Cinematography: Kirsten Johnson
- Edited by: Sari Gilman
- Release date: April 24, 2010 (Tribeca)
- Running time: 60 minutes
- Country: United States
- Language: English

No Woman, No Cry is a 2010 documentary film about maternal death, directed by Christy Turlington. The film premiered at the 2010 Tribeca Film Festival.
