= 1998 in music =

This is a list of notable events in music that took place in the year 1998.

== Specific locations ==
- 1998 in British music
- 1998 in Norwegian music
- 1998 in Scandinavian music
- 1998 in South Korean music

== Specific genres ==
- 1998 in classical music
- 1998 in country music
- 1998 in heavy metal music
- 1998 in hip-hop
- 1998 in jazz
- 1998 in Latin music
- 1998 in progressive rock

== Events ==
=== January ===
- January 28
  - Interscope Records pays a radio station in Portland, Oregon, USA, $5000 to play the Limp Bizkit single "Counterfeit" fifty times. The business move is widely criticized in the media as "payola", but the controversy serves to further increase publicity for the band.
  - "Weird Al" Yankovic gets LASIK surgery to cure his myopia. At the same time, he grows out his hair and shaves off his moustache, radically changing his signature look.

=== February ===
- February 5
  - Carnatic vocalist M. S. Subbulakshmi becomes the first musician ever to be awarded the Bharat Ratna, India's highest civilian award.
  - Former Judas Priest frontman Rob Halford publicly reveals his homosexuality for the first time in an interview with MTV.
- February 15 – Sir Edward Elgar's unfinished Third Symphony, completed by Anthony Payne, is performed for the first time at the Royal Festival Hall, London, UK.
- February 19 – The Stray Cats reunite for a benefit show for the Carl Perkins Foundation at House of Blues in Los Angeles, USA.
- February 21 – Misia makes her official CD debut with the single "Tsutsumikomu Yō ni...".
- February 23 – "Frozen", the first single from Madonna's eighth studio album, Ray of Light, is released. The single is a worldwide hit, peaking at #2 on US Billboard Hot 100 and becoming her first single to enter the charts at #1 in the UK.
- February 24 – Elton John is knighted by Queen Elizabeth II of the United Kingdom at Buckingham Palace, London, UK. He was mistakenly introduced as "Sir John Elton", but was renamed "Sir Elton John".
- February 25 – The 40th Annual Grammy Awards are presented in New York, hosted by Kelsey Grammer. Bob Dylan, Alison Krauss and R. Kelly all win three awards each, with Dylan winning Album of the Year for Time Out of Mind. Shawn Colvin's "Sunny Came Home" wins both Record of the Year and Song of the Year. Paula Cole wins Best New Artist.
- February 28 – Haitian group RAM survive an assassination attempt while performing at a carnival, after a disagreement with the newly elected mayor of Port-au-Prince.

=== March ===
- March 3 – Madonna releases her seventh studio album Ray of Light. The album marks a completely new lyric and musical approach for Madonna, and gains her numerous awards, including four Grammy Awards out of a total of six nominations.
- March 10 – The South Korean-made MPMan, the first mass-produced digital audio player, is launched at the CeBIT trade fair in Hanover, Germany.
- March 13 – The Smashing Pumpkins file a US$1 million lawsuit against UK-based Sound And Media Ltd, alleging that the company has released a book and CD about the band without permission.

=== April ===
- April 3 – Dave Navarro is fired by Red Hot Chili Peppers.
- April 6 – Organizers announce that Lollapalooza will not be staged in 1998 following unsuccessful attempts to sign a major headlining act. The festival would return in 2003.
- April 7 – George Michael is arrested in a public restroom in Beverly Hills, California, USA for lewd conduct. He is subsequently sentenced to community service, and later describes it as a "subconsciously deliberate act".
- April 8 – Ayumi Hamasaki makes her debut under Avex Trax with the single "Poker Face".
- April 14 – The first VH1 Divas Live concert is broadcast on VH1, starring Aretha Franklin, Gloria Estefan, Céline Dion, Shania Twain and Mariah Carey.
- April 17–19 – The second Terrastock festival takes place in San Francisco, USA.

=== May ===
- May 8
  - The third European Festival of Youth Choirs is held in Basel, Switzerland.
  - A British court rules in favor of the Beatles and John Lennon's widow, Yoko Ono, stopping the release of another Live at the Star Club recording. All copies of the recording and the original tape are awarded to the Beatles, as well as damages and legal costs.
- May 9 – The 43rd Eurovision Song Contest, held in Birmingham, United Kingdom, is won by Israel's transgender performer Dana International with the song "Diva".
- May 26 – Anggun releases her debut album, Snow on the Sahara in North America, which would go on to sell 1 million copies across Europe and America and becoming the best-selling album by Asian artist outside Asia.
- May 27 – Ringo Sheena releases her debut single "Kōfukuron".
- May 31 – Geri Halliwell goes into hiding as her public relations representative, Julian Torton, confirms that she has left the Spice Girls permanently.

=== June–July ===
- July 3 – Irish boy band Westlife is created (as "Westside") and signed to the record label BMG.
- July 5 – Teen singer Billie Piper becomes the youngest British solo artist to enter the UK singles charts at #1, with "Because We Want To".
- July 17 – Aiko makes her major label debut with the song "Ashita".

=== August ===
- August 1 – VH1 Smooth is launched. The first music video played is a cover of "Makin' Whoopee" by Branford Marsalis.
- August 18 – Korn's third studio album, Follow the Leader, enters Billboard 200 at number 1, with 268,000 copies sold in its first week. It goes on to be certified 5× Platinum by the RIAA and sell over 14 million copies worldwide, thus launching nu metal into the mainstream.
- August 25 – Lauryn Hill releases her breakthrough debut album The Miseducation of Lauryn Hill. The album goes on to be certified 7× Platinum by the RIAA and sell over 19 million copies worldwide.
- August 29 – The Bee Gees open their One Night Only tour in Dublin, Ireland

=== September ===
- September 14 – US TV show Total Request Live is broadcast for the first time on MTV.
- September 16 – Lou Reed performs for President of the Czech Republic Václav Havel at the White House.
- September 29 – Britney Spears' debut single, "...Baby One More Time", is released. It would become the top-selling single of 1999, selling over ten million units worldwide. It was also the biggest hit single of 1999. The "...Baby One More Time" music video was ranked as number three on Billboard's 2010 list of "Best Music Videos of All Time".

=== October ===
- October 5 – MuchMoreMusic is launched in Canada.
- October 6 – Kurupt's debut studio album, Kuruption!, is released by Antra Records. It peaks at #8 on the Billboard 200 on October 24, 1998.
- October 8 – The Recording Industry Association of America files in court against Diamond Multimedia in an attempt to block the release of the new Rio PMP300, arguing that the MP3 digital audio player is a music piracy device. The RIAA's application is denied on October 26, clearing the way for the PMP300 to become the first commercially successful MP3 player.
- October 19 – "Believe", the first single of Cher's twenty-second studio album of the same name is released, becoming a smash hit. After seven consecutive weeks atop the UK official singles chart, it becomes the UK's bestselling single of the year, and also the bestselling single by a female artist in UK history. On March 13, 1999, Believe becomes Cher's 5th number-one single in the US, spending four consecutive weeks at #1 and becoming the bestselling single of that year.
- October 22 – Cher releases her twenty-second studio album Believe, which becomes the most successful of her career: It peaks at number one in seven countries, #4 in the US, and #7 in the UK. The album goes on to sell over 20 million copies worldwide and is certified platinum in at least sixteen countries, becoming one of the bestselling albums of all time.
- October 27 – The Copyright Term Extension Act is signed into law, giving the entertainment industry 20 more years of exclusive rights to all works created since 1923.

=== November ===
- November 14 – The 27th OTI Festival, held at the Teatro Nacional in San José, Costa Rica, is won by the song "Fin de siglo, éste es el tiempo de inflamarse, deprimirse o transformarse", written and performed by Florcita Motuda representing Chile.
- November 17 – The Offspring release Americana to massive mainstream success. It goes on to be certified 5× platinum by the RIAA and sells over 11 million copies worldwide. The hit single "Pretty Fly (for a White Guy)" becomes one of the best charting worldwide punk songs of all time, topping charts in 9 countries.

=== December ===
- December 5
  - Young violinists Nicola Benedetti and Alina Ibragimova play Bach's double violin concerto under the baton of Yehudi Menuhin at the opening ceremony of the 50th Anniversary of the Universal Declaration of Human Rights at UNESCO in Paris.
  - Billboard changes its policy for its Hot 100 chart to allow airplay-only singles or album cuts to be accounted in the chart.
- December 9 – Hikaru Utada makes their debut with the double A-side single "Automatic (Hikaru Utadasong)" / "Time Will Tell".
- December 29 – India issues a set of postage stamps on the subject of Indian musical instruments.

=== Also in 1998 ===
- The Royal Liverpool Philharmonic Orchestra launches its own recording label, RLPO Live.
- Singers Brandy and Monica dominate the Billboard charts with the duet, "The Boy Is Mine", holding the Billboard Hot 100 No. 1 spot for 13 weeks.
- Composer John Harbison was awarded a Heinz Award for the Arts and Humanities.
- The Goo Goo Dolls single, "Iris", set a new Billboard Hot 100 Airplay record in the U.S. by achieving 18 weeks at number one.

== Bands formed ==
- See Musical groups established in 1998

== Bands reformed ==
- Modern Talking
- Culture Club

== Bands disbanded ==
- See Musical groups disestablished in 1998

== Albums released ==
=== January–March ===
Date		Album	Artist	Notes
J A N U A R Y	1	Double Trouble Two	Barry Guy London Jazz Composers Orchestra with Irène Schweizer, Marilyn Crispell, and Pierre Favre	-
J A N U A R Y	5	Aquarius	Boards of Canada	EP
J A N U A R Y	6	Great Expectations	Various Artists	Soundtrack
J A N U A R Y	13	All Fall Down	Against All Authority	-
J A N U A R Y	13	Backbone	Backbone	Featuring Bill Kreutzmann
J A N U A R Y	13	Challenge for a Civilized Society	Unwound	-
J A N U A R Y	13	Money, Power & Respect	The Lox	-
J A N U A R Y	13	Naked Baby Photos	Ben Folds Five	Compilation
J A N U A R Y	13	Preemptive Strike	DJ Shadow	Singles compilation
J A N U A R Y	13	The Troubleshooters	Funkdoobiest	-
J A N U A R Y	13	Yodel the Cowboy Way	Riders in the Sky	-
J A N U A R Y	15	Vain Glory Opera	Edguy	Germany
J A N U A R Y	16	Moon Safari	Air	France
J A N U A R Y	19	The Blue Cafe	Chris Rea	-
J A N U A R Y	20	Caught in a Trap and I Can't Back Out 'Cause I Love You Too Much, Baby	Mark Eitzel	-
J A N U A R Y	20	Cold	Cold	-
J A N U A R Y	20	Loaded Deck	Ace Frehley	Compilation
J A N U A R Y	20	My Secret Passion: The Arias	Michael Bolton	-
J A N U A R Y	20	Springtime	Freakwater	-
J A N U A R Y	20	Viva la Ska Revolution	Bad Manners	Compilation
J A N U A R Y	23	Ce que je sais	Johnny Hallyday	-
J A N U A R Y	26	Decksandrumsandrockandroll	Propellerheads	-
J A N U A R Y	26	Dig My Mood	Nick Lowe	-
J A N U A R Y	26	Time Machines	Coil	-
J A N U A R Y	27	American Teenage Rock 'n' Roll Machine	The Donnas	-
J A N U A R Y	27	Do or Die	Dropkick Murphys	-
J A N U A R Y	27	Downward Is Heavenward	Hum	-
J A N U A R Y	27	Got No Shadow	Mary Lou Lord	-
J A N U A R Y	27	Saturnz Return	Goldie	-
J A N U A R Y	27	Skull Orchard	Jon Langford	-
J A N U A R Y	27	Wide Open Spaces	The Chicks	-
J A N U A R Y	29	Crystal Ball	Prince	Box set
F E B R U A R Y	2	International Velvet	Catatonia	-
F E B R U A R Y	3	Blues Brothers 2000	Various Artists	Soundtrack
F E B R U A R Y	3	Ready for the World	INOJ	-
F E B R U A R Y	3	Strange Angels	Kristin Hersh	-
F E B R U A R Y	3	Yield	Pearl Jam	-
F E B R U A R Y	9	Conforming to Abnormality	Cephalic Carnage	-
F E B R U A R Y	10	Facing the Animal	Yngwie Malmsteen	-
F E B R U A R Y	10	The Din Pedals	The Din Pedals	
F E B R U A R Y	10	In the Aeroplane Over the Sea	Neutral Milk Hotel	US
F E B R U A R Y	10	Let It Come Down	James Iha	-
F E B R U A R Y	10	Once Sent from the Golden Hall	Amon Amarth	Debut
F E B R U A R Y	10	One Night	J.C. Jones	-
F E B R U A R Y	10	Best Of, Volume One	Ray Lynch	Compilation
F E B R U A R Y	10	Tank Top City	Sugarsmack	-
F E B R U A R Y	10	Terraform	Shellac	-
F E B R U A R Y	10	Vuelve	Ricky Martin	-
F E B R U A R Y	16	Come Clean	Curve	-
F E B R U A R Y	17	Attack of The Planet Smashers	The Planet Smashers	-
F E B R U A R Y	17	The Big Knockover	No Fun at All	US
F E B R U A R Y	17	Charge It 2 da Game	Silkk the Shocker	-
F E B R U A R Y	17	Deconstructing Beck	Anonymous	Released on Illegal Art
F E B R U A R Y	17	Destiny's Child	Destiny's Child	US
F E B R U A R Y	17	In the World: From Natchez to New York	Olu Dara	-
F E B R U A R Y	17	Little Plastic Castle	Ani DiFranco	-
F E B R U A R Y	17	Str8 Outta Northcote	Blood Duster	-
F E B R U A R Y	18	Gently, Down the Stream	Come	-
F E B R U A R Y	18	Success	The Posies	-
F E B R U A R Y	24	99th Dream	Swervedriver	-
F E B R U A R Y	24	Ain't It the Truth	Daryle Singletary	-
F E B R U A R Y	24	Americana Deluxe	Big Bad Voodoo Daddy	-
F E B R U A R Y	24	Dose	Gov't Mule	-
F E B R U A R Y	24	For a Lifetime	Jonathan Cain	-
F E B R U A R Y	24	Formulas Fatal to the Flesh	Morbid Angel	-
F E B R U A R Y	24	Headfirst Into Everything	Mystery Machine	-
F E B R U A R Y	24	Heavy Mental	Killah Priest	Debut
F E B R U A R Y	24	Inferno – Last in Live	Dio	Live
F E B R U A R Y	24	Legends	Above the Law	-
F E B R U A R Y	24	Let Them Eat Pussy	Nashville Pussy	Debut
F E B R U A R Y	24	My Homies	Scarface	-
F E B R U A R Y	24	Stoners Reeking Havoc	Kottonmouth Kings	EP
F E B R U A R Y	24	Stratosphere	Duster	-
F E B R U A R Y	24	SYR3: Invito Al Ĉielo	Sonic Youth	EP
F E B R U A R Y	24	This Strange Place	Wolfstone	-
F E B R U A R Y	24	Til My Casket Drops	C-Bo	-
F E B R U A R Y	24	Train	Train	-
F E B R U A R Y	24	Union	Union	-
F E B R U A R Y	23	Camoufleur	Gastr del Sol	-
F E B R U A R Y	25	Bustin' + Dronin'	Blur	Remix & Live Album
F E B R U A R Y	25	Heart	L'Arc-en-Ciel	-
M A R C H	2	Pandemonic Incantations	Behemoth	-
M A R C H	2	Pennsylvania	Pere Ubu	-
M A R C H	4	Ray of Light	Madonna	-
M A R C H	4	Crystal Planet	Joe Satriani	-
M A R C H	4	Elmopalooza!	Various Artists	Soundtrack
M A R C H	4	Soundtrack for the film Future Unseen	Frankie Death and The Photon Belt	-
M A R C H	9	117°	Izzy Stradlin	-
M A R C H	9	Northern Star	Groove Armada	Debut
M A R C H	9	Pilgrim	Eric Clapton	-
M A R C H	9	Return to the Last Chance Saloon	The Bluetones	-
M A R C H	9	Tin Planet	Space	-
M A R C H	10	19th Street LBC Compilation	Various Artists	Compilation
M A R C H	10	All the Pain Money Can Buy	Fastball	-
M A R C H	10	Becoming Remixed	Sneaker Pimps	Remix
M A R C H	10	The Chinese Album	Spacehog	-
M A R C H	10	The Collection	Bad Manners	Compilation
M A R C H	10	Contact from the Underworld of Redboy	Robbie Robertson	-
M A R C H	10	Jimmy Ray	Jimmy Ray	-
M A R C H	10	Liquid Tension Experiment	Liquid Tension Experiment	-
M A R C H	10	Living Space	John Coltrane	-
M A R C H	10	Pure Frosting	The Presidents of the United States of America	Compilation
M A R C H	10	Snake Bite Love	Motörhead	-
M A R C H	10	Solex vs. the Hitmeister	Solex	Debut
M A R C H	10	The Surveillance	Trans Am	-
M A R C H	10	TNT	Tortoise	-
M A R C H	10	Voyeurs	2wo	-
M A R C H	13	A.K.A. I-D-I-O-T	The Hives	EP
M A R C H	16	Big Calm	Morcheeba	-
M A R C H	16	Néapolis	Simple Minds	-
M A R C H	16	North Pole Radio Station	Pram	-
M A R C H	16	Kansas	Jennifer Knapp	Debut
M A R C H	17	Hazleton	Fuel	EP
M A R C H	17	I'm Alright	Jo Dee Messina	-
M A R C H	17	Life or Death	C-Murder	-
M A R C H	17	The Players Club: Music From and Inspired by the Motion Picture	Various Artists	Soundtrack
M A R C H	17	Retaliation, Revenge & Get Back	Daz Dillinger	-
M A R C H	17	Van Halen III	Van Halen	-
M A R C H	23	Virtual XI	Iron Maiden	-
M A R C H	23	Twilight in Olympus	Symphony X	-
M A R C H	23	A Rose Is Still a Rose	Aretha Franklin	-
M A R C H	23	XIII	Rage	-
M A R C H	24	3rd Eye Vision	Hieroglyphics	Debut
M A R C H	24	Colma	Buckethead	-
M A R C H	24	The Devil You Know	Econoline Crush	US
M A R C H	24	Feeling Strangely Fine	Semisonic	-
M A R C H	24	Greatest Hits Live	Journey	Live
M A R C H	24	Guilty 'til Proved Innocent!	The Specials	-
M A R C H	24	Happy?	Jann Arden	US; released in Canada in '97
M A R C H	24	Head Trip in Every Key	Superdrag	-
M A R C H	24	Keasbey Nights	Catch 22	-
M A R C H	24	Media	The Faint	-
M A R C H	24	NSYNC	NSYNC	US
M A R C H	24	The Pillage	Cappadonna	-
M A R C H	24	Space Heater	The Reverend Horton Heat	-
M A R C H	30	This Is Hardcore	Pulp	-
M A R C H	31	Boggy Depot	Jerry Cantrell	LP
M A R C H	31	In the Line of Fire	Hussein Fatal	-
M A R C H	31	Let's Ride	Montell Jordan	-
M A R C H	31	Moment of Truth	Gang Starr	-
M A R C H	31	The Ponzi Scheme	Firewater	-
M A R C H	31	Night Versions: The Essential Duran Duran	Duran Duran	Remix
M A R C H	31	Sunburn	Fuel	Debut
M A R C H	31	12 Bar Blues	Scott Weiland	-
M A R C H	31	Wishpool	Brother Cane	-
M A R C H	31	City of Angels	Various Artists	Soundtrack
M A R C H	?	Queen of All Ears	The Lounge Lizards	-

=== April–June ===
Date		Album	Artist	Notes
A P R I L	1	Three Out Change	Supercar	Debut
A P R I L	6	People Move On	Bernard Butler	Debut
A P R I L	6	Through the Trees	The Handsome Family	-
A P R I L	7	A Go Go	John Scofield	with Medeski, Martin and Wood
A P R I L	7	Battle Hymns	The Suicide Machines	-
A P R I L	7	Boggy Depot	Jerry Cantrell	LP
A P R I L	7	Crossroads and Illusions	Strung Out	EP
A P R I L	7	Darkest Days	Stabbing Westward	-
A P R I L	7	Elemental	The Fixx	-
A P R I L	7	Fundamental	Bonnie Raitt	-
A P R I L	7	Headz or Tailz	Do or Die	-
A P R I L	7	I Got the Hook Up	Various Artists	Soundtrack
A P R I L	7	King Biscuit Flower Hour: Bachman–Turner Overdrive	Bachman–Turner Overdrive	Live
A P R I L	7	Lacuna Coil	Lacuna Coil	EP
A P R I L	7	Still Standing	Goodie Mob	-
A P R I L	7	Thrills	Andrew Bird	-
A P R I L	7	The Wake of Magellan	Savatage	-
A P R I L	7	www.pitchshifter.com	Pitchshifter	-
A P R I L	13	Bring It On	Gomez	-
A P R I L	14	Breath from Another	Esthero	Canada
A P R I L	14	The Elephant Riders	Clutch	-
A P R I L	14	When Forever Comes Crashing	Converge	-
A P R I L	14	Rialto	Rialto	Debut
A P R I L	20	Walking Into Clarksdale	Jimmy Page and Robert Plant	-
A P R I L	20	Mezzanine	Massive Attack	-
A P R I L	20	Music Has the Right to Children	Boards of Canada	-
A P R I L	21	Airbag / How Am I Driving?	Radiohead	EP
A P R I L	21	Blue	The Jesus Lizard	-
A P R I L	21	Bulworth	Various Artists	-
A P R I L	21	Dead	Obituary	Live
A P R I L	21	Faith	Faith Hill	-
A P R I L	21	Featuring "Birds"	Quasi	-
A P R I L	21	Gallery of Suicide	Cannibal Corpse	-
A P R I L	21	He Got Game	Public Enemy	Soundtrack
A P R I L	21	Hey You, I Love Your Soul	Skillet	-
A P R I L	21	Light Fuse, Get Away	Widespread Panic	Live
A P R I L	21	Master of Styles	The Urge	-
A P R I L	21	Mýa	Mýa	-
A P R I L	21	Mya	Mya	Debut
A P R I L	21	Perfect Night: Live in London	Lou Reed	Live
A P R I L	21	Soulfly	Soulfly	-
A P R I L	21	Stigmata	Arch Enemy	-
A P R I L	21	A S.W.A.T. Healin' Ritual	Witchdoctor	-
A P R I L	21	You and You Alone	Randy Travis	-
A P R I L	27	Discouraged Ones	Katatonia	-
A P R I L	27	Greed	Pulkas	Debut
A P R I L	27	Nightfall in Middle-Earth	Blind Guardian	-
A P R I L	27	Vobiscum Satanas	Dark Funeral	-
A P R I L	28	Amongst the Catacombs of Nephren-Ka	Nile	-
A P R I L	28	Before These Crowded Streets	Dave Matthews Band	-
A P R I L	28	Ça Va	Slapp Happy	-
A P R I L	28	Capital Punishment	Big Pun	-
A P R I L	28	Diabolical Conquest	Incantation	
A P R I L	28	End Hits	Fugazi	-
A P R I L	28	Eve 6	Eve 6	Debut
A P R I L	28	Live the Life	Michael W. Smith	-
A P R I L	28	Navy Blues	Sloan	Canada
A P R I L	28	The Trouble with Angels	Juice Newton	-
A P R I L	28	Visual Audio Sensory Theater	VAST	-
M A Y	4	Cruelty and the Beast	Cradle of Filth	-
M A Y	4	From the Choirgirl Hotel	Tori Amos	-
M A Y	4	Good Humor	Saint Etienne	-
M A Y	4	Mass Nerder	ALL	-
M A Y	4	Push the Button	Money Mark	-
M A Y	4	A Series of Sneaks	Spoon	-
M A Y	4	Sittin' on Top of the World	LeAnn Rimes	-
M A Y	4	Vovin	Therion	-
M A Y	5	Leave a Mark	John Michael Montgomery	-
M A Y	5	Lyricist Lounge, Volume One	Various Artists	Compilation
M A Y	5	No Substance	Bad Religion	-
M A Y	5	The Speed of the Old Long Bow	John Hartford	-
M A Y	5	There's One in Every Family	Fiend	-
M A Y	5	Twisted by Design	Strung Out	-
M A Y	11	Sketches for My Sweetheart the Drunk	Jeff Buckley	Europe
M A Y	11	Muse	Muse	Debut/EP
M A Y	11	The Best of Nick Cave and the Bad Seeds	Nick Cave and the Bad Seeds	Compilation
M A Y	12	3 Car Garage	Hanson	Compilation
M A Y	12	5	Lenny Kravitz	-
M A Y	12	The Best of Michael Franks: A Backward Glance	Michael Franks	Compilation
M A Y	12	Candy from a Stranger	Soul Asylum	-
M A Y	12	The Closer I Get	Hayden	-
M A Y	12	A Thousand Leaves	Sonic Youth	-
M A Y	12	Traces of My Lipstick	Xscape	-
M A Y	12	Version 2.0	Garbage	-
M A Y	15	Shrink	The Notwist	-
M A Y	18	Photograph Smile	Julian Lennon	-
M A Y	18	Chapter I: A New Beginning	The Moffatts	Canada
M A Y	18	Consumed	Plastikman	-
M A Y	18	Dile al sol	La Oreja de Van Gogh	Debut
M A Y	18	Knights of the Cross	Grave Digger	-
M A Y	19	Always Never the Same	Kansas	-
M A Y	19	Bach to the Future	Safri Duo	-
M A Y	19	The Black Light	Calexico	-
M A Y	19	Godzilla: The Album	Various Artists	Soundtrack
M A Y	19	How I Feel	Terri Clark	-
M A Y	19	Into the Sun	Sean Lennon	Debut
M A Y	19	It's Dark and Hell Is Hot	DMX	Debut
M A Y	19	Me	The Mekons	-
M A Y	19	On the Wires of Our Nerves	Add N to (X)	-
M A Y	19	Ophelia	Natalie Merchant	-
M A Y	19	Overcome by Happiness	Pernice Brothers	Debut
M A Y	19	Rufus Wainwright	Rufus Wainwright	-
M A Y	19	Smokefest Underground	Snoop Doggy Dogg	-
M A Y	19	The Jazz Singers	Various Artists	Compilation
M A Y	19	Where Blood and Fire Bring Rest	Zao	-
M A Y	20	B'z The Best "Pleasure"	B'z	Compilation
M A Y	20	Steelbath Suicide	Soilwork	-
M A Y	21	Take Off and Landing	Yoshinori Sunahara	-
M A Y	25	Angels with Dirty Faces	Tricky	-
M A Y	25	Safety	Coldplay	EP
M A Y	25	Super æ	Boredoms	-
M A Y	25	When We Were the New Boys	Rod Stewart	-
M A Y	25	Where We Belong	Boyzone	-
M A Y	26	The A-Files: Alien Songs	Alvin and the Chipmunks	-
M A Y	26	Don't Sweat the Technics	Kid 606	-
M A Y	26	Navy Blues	Sloan	US
M A Y	26	Snow on the Sahara	Anggun	International debut album
M A Y	26	Time Capsule: Songs for a Future Generation	The B-52's	Compilation +2 new tracks
M A Y	30	Leitmotif	dredg	-
J U N E	1	Blodhemn	Enslaved	-
J U N E	1	Jurassic 5	Jurassic 5	-
J U N E	1	Let It Ride	Shed Seven	-
J U N E	1	Permutation	Amon Tobin	-
J U N E	2	Adore	The Smashing Pumpkins	-
J U N E	2	BBC Sessions	The Jimi Hendrix Experience	Compilation
J U N E	2	www.tism.wanker.com	TISM	-
J U N E	2	Freak*on*ica	Girls Against Boys	-
J U N E	2	gloria!	Gloria Estefan	-
J U N E	2	If You See Her	Brooks & Dunn	-
J U N E	2	MP Da Last Don	Master P	-
J U N E	2	Munki	The Jesus and Mary Chain	-
J U N E	2	Rant And Roar	Great Big Sea	Compilation
J U N E	2	RFTC	Rocket from the Crypt	-
J U N E	2	Shut 'Em Down	Onyx	-
J U N E	2	The X-Files: The Album	Various Artists	Soundtrack
J U N E	8	The Good Will Out	Embrace	-
J U N E	8	Peloton	The Delgados	-
J U N E	8	Undo the Wicked	Diecast	Debut
J U N E	9	The Devil's Bris	Voltaire	-
J U N E	9	Diabolus in Musica	Slayer	-
J U N E	9	DLR Band	David Lee Roth	-
J U N E	9	Jubilee	Grant Lee Buffalo	-
J U N E	9	Left of Cool	Béla Fleck and the Flecktones	-
J U N E	9	A Long Way Home	Dwight Yoakam	-
J U N E	9	Look My Way	Madball	-
J U N E	9	My Secret Life	Sonia Dada	-
J U N E	9	Never Say Never	Brandy	-
J U N E	9	Payton's Place	Nicholas Payton	-
J U N E	9	Perversion	Gravity Kills	-
J U N E	9	Premonition	John Fogerty	Live
J U N E	15	Try Whistling This	Neil Finn	Solo debut
J U N E	16	Aaron Carter	Aaron Carter	US; released in Europe Dec. '97
J U N E	16	Vertical Man	Ringo Starr	US; released in UK 3 August
J U N E	16	Imagination	Brian Wilson	-
J U N E	16	Look What You Did to Me	Z-Ro	-
J U N E	16	The Philosopher's Stone	Van Morrison	Compilation
J U N E	16	Order in the Court	Queen Latifah	-
J U N E	16	Dr. Dolittle: The Album	Various Artists	Soundtrack
J U N E	16	Ozomatli	Ozomatli	Debut
J U N E	16	Powertrip	Monster Magnet	-
J U N E	16	Silent Reign of Heroes	Molly Hatchet	-
J U N E	16	Slowly Going the Way of the Buffalo	MxPx	-
J U N E	16	Under the Radar	Little Feat	-
J U N E	22	5ive	Five	UK
J U N E	22	Alternative 4	Anathema	-
J U N E	22	Bootlegged in Japan	Napalm Death	Live
J U N E	22	Five	Five	Debut
J U N E	22	Genesis Archive 1967–75	Genesis	Box Set
J U N E	23	CPR	CPR	-
J U N E	23	The Dirty Boogie	The Brian Setzer Orchestra	-
J U N E	23	The Haunted	The Haunted	-
J U N E	23	Hitler Bad, Vandals Good	The Vandals	-
J U N E	23	Mermaid Avenue	Billy Bragg and Wilco	-
J U N E	23	Midwestern Songs of the Americas	Dillinger Four	-
J U N E	23	Obscura	Gorguts	-
J U N E	23	Occupational Hazard	Unsane	-
J U N E	23	Poly Sci	John Forté	Debut
J U N E	23	Stand by Your Van	Sublime	Live
J U N E	23	Strung Out in Heaven	The Brian Jonestown Massacre	-
J U N E	23	Time	Lionel Richie	-
J U N E	23	We Ran	Linda Ronstadt	-
J U N E	23	Waved Out	Robert Pollard	-
J U N E	24	Mother Father Brother Sister	Misia	Debut
J U N E	29	Supernatural	Des'ree	-
J U N E	30	As Tradition Dies Slowly	Morning Again	-
J U N E	30	Aquamosh	Plastilina Mosh	-
J U N E	30	Behind the Front	Black Eyed Peas	Debut
J U N E	30	The Best Of	James	Compilation
J U N E	30	Car Wheels on a Gravel Road	Lucinda Williams	-
J U N E	30	Carry On	Crosby, Stills, Nash & Young	-
J U N E	30	Comin' Atcha!	Cleopatra	-
J U N E	30	Concerto Suite for Electric Guitar and Orchestra	Yngwie Malmsteen	-
J U N E	30	808:88:98	808 State	Compilation
J U N E	30	El Niño	Def Squad	-
J U N E	30	Embrya	Maxwell	-
J U N E	30	Life Won't Wait	Rancid	-
J U N E	30	Live & Rare	Rage Against the Machine	Live
J U N E	30	Live at the Jazz Cafe	D'Angelo	Live
J U N E	30	Miles from Our Home	Cowboy Junkies	-
J U N E	30	Newpower Soul	The New Power Generation	-
J U N E	30	Punk-O-Rama Vol. 3	Various Artists	Compilation
J U N E	30	Ruthless for Life	MC Ren	-
J U N E	30	Something's Gotta Give	Agnostic Front	-
J U N E	30	Static	Bleach	-
J U N E	30	Step Up to the Microphone	Newsboys	Major label debut
J U N E	30	System of a Down	System of a Down	Debut

=== July–September ===
Date		Album	Artist	Notes
J U L Y	1	Three Days Broken	Big Blue Monkey	-
J U L Y	6	Hello Nasty	Beastie Boys	Europe
J U L Y	6	Champagne	Miss Kittin & The Hacker	EP
J U L Y	6	Breaking God's Heart	Hefner	Debut
J U L Y	6	Redneck Wonderland	Midnight Oil	-
J U L Y	7	Burn Out	Slick Shoes	-
J U L Y	7	Crackle – The Best of Bauhaus	Bauhaus	Compilation
J U L Y	7	Destroy What Destroys You	Against All Authority	-
J U L Y	7	Jesus Hits Like the Atom Bomb	Tripping Daisy	-
J U L Y	7	Panique celtique	Manau	-
J U L Y	7	Something Wicked This Way Comes	Iced Earth	-
J U L Y	7	Soul's Core	Shawn Mullins	-
J U L Y	7	Stunt	Barenaked Ladies	-
J U L Y	7	Visions of Europe	Stratovarius	Live
J U L Y	8	Impossible Remixes	Kylie Minogue	Remix; Australia only
J U L Y	13	The Fists of Time	As Friends Rust	EP
J U L Y	13	Two Pages	4hero	-
J U L Y	14	Across a Wire: Live in New York City	Counting Crows	Live
J U L Y	14	Black Music	Chocolate Genius	-
J U L Y	14	The Band Geek Mafia	Voodoo Glow Skulls	-
J U L Y	14	Blue Planet	Donna Lewis	-
J U L Y	14	The Boy Is Mine	Monica	-
J U L Y	14	Destiny	Stratovarius	-
J U L Y	14	5ive	Five	US
J U L Y	14	Fireworks	Angra	-
J U L Y	14	Flowers	Ace of Base	-
J U L Y	14	Great Big Western Howdy!	Riders in the Sky	-
J U L Y	14	N.O.R.E.	Noreaga	-
J U L Y	14	Orange Ave.	Seven Mary Three	-
J U L Y	14	Phantom Power	The Tragically Hip	-
J U L Y	14	Pixies at the BBC	Pixies	Live
J U L Y	14	Silver Session for Jason Knuth	Sonic Youth	EP
J U L Y	14	Where Your Road Leads	Trisha Yearwood	-
J U L Y	20	Desireless	Eagle-Eye Cherry	Debut
J U L Y	20	England Made Me	Black Box Recorder	Debut
J U L Y	20	Glam	Mouse on Mars	-
J U L Y	20	Good Morning Spider	Sparklehorse	-
J U L Y	21	Come 2 My House	Chaka Khan	-
J U L Y	21	Confessions of Fire	Cam'ron	-
J U L Y	21	G-Funk Classics, Vols. 1 & 2	Nate Dogg	-
J U L Y	21	Happy Pills	Candlebox	-
J U L Y	21	The Jesus Record	Rich Mullins and A Ragamuffin Band	-
J U L Y	21	Life in 1472	Jermaine Dupri	-
J U L Y	21	Other Voices, Too (A Trip Back to Bountiful)	Nanci Griffith	-
J U L Y	21	Picnic Of Love	Anal Cunt	-
J U L Y	21	Scraps at Midnight	Mark Lanegan	-
J U L Y	21	Slide	Lisa Germano	-
J U L Y	21	Volume 8: The Threat Is Real	Anthrax	-
J U L Y	23	3.2.1.	Zilch	Debut
J U L Y	23	Shine	Luna Sea	-
J U L Y	27	Killing on Adrenaline	Dying Fetus	-
J U L Y	28	Forever with You	Phyllis Hyman	-
J U L Y	28	Hell Among the Yearlings	Gillian Welch	-
J U L Y	28	Introducing the Minutemen	Minutemen	Compilation
J U L Y	28	Obsolete	Fear Factory	-
J U L Y	28	This Time it's Love	Kurt Elling	-
J U L Y	29	Pure Soul	Glay	-
A U G U S T	3	Mixes	Kylie Minogue	Remix; UK only
A U G U S T	3	Now That's What I Call Music! 40 (UK series)	Various Artists	Compilation
A U G U S T	4	Blender	The Murmurs	-
A U G U S T	4	Da Game Is to Be Sold, Not to Be Told	Snoop Dogg	-
A U G U S T	4	For the Masses	Various Artists	Depeche Mode tribute
A U G U S T	4	Godless Savage Garden	Dimmu Borgir	Compilation
A U G U S T	4	Perennial Favorites	Squirrel Nut Zippers	-
A U G U S T	4	Siége Perilous	Kamelot	-
A U G U S T	5	Dragon	Loudness	-
A U G U S T	10	The Sky Is Too High	Graham Coxon	-
A U G U S T	11	And You Think You Know What Life's About	Dishwalla	-
A U G U S T	11	Combustication	Medeski, Martin and Wood	-
A U G U S T	11	Duck and Cover	Mad Caddies	-
A U G U S T	11	The Element of Surprise	E-40	-
A U G U S T	11	Endless Harmony Soundtrack	The Beach Boys	Compilation
A U G U S T	11	First Family 4 Life	M.O.P.	-
A U G U S T	11	How Stella Got Her Groove Back Soundtrack	Various Artists	Soundtrack
A U G U S T	11	Jennifer Paige	Jennifer Paige	-
A U G U S T	11	The Key	Vince Gill	-
A U G U S T	11	Massive Grooves from the Electric Church of Psychofunkadelic Grungelism Rock Music	Poundhound	-
A U G U S T	11	Re-wind	Front Line Assembly	Remix
A U G U S T	11	Rhinoplasty	Primus	EP
A U G U S T	11	Royal Highness	Kottonmouth Kings	-
A U G U S T	11	Severe Tire Damage	They Might Be Giants	Live
A U G U S T	11	Soul of a Woman	Kelly Price	Debut
A U G U S T	11	Spyboy	Emmylou Harris	Live
A U G U S T	11	Turnstyles & Junkpiles	Pullman	Debut
A U G U S T	18	Aégis	Theatre of Tragedy	-
A U G U S T	18	Candyass	Orgy	-
A U G U S T	18	Devil Without a Cause	Kid Rock	-
A U G U S T	18	Follow The Leader	Korn	-
A U G U S T	18	In/Casino/Out	At the Drive-In	-
A U G U S T	18	My Arms, Your Hearse	Opeth	-
A U G U S T	18	Phoenix Rising	The Temptations	-
A U G U S T	18	Postcards from Heaven	Lighthouse Family	US
A U G U S T	18	Something About Airplanes	Death Cab for Cutie	-
A U G U S T	18	Quick	Buju Banton	-
A U G U S T	24	Boogaloo	Nazareth	UK
A U G U S T	25	40 Dayz & 40 Nightz	Xzibit	-
A U G U S T	25	Back to Titanic	James Horner	Soundtrack
A U G U S T	25	Bed	Juliana Hatfield	-
A U G U S T	25	Brazil	Men at Work	Live
A U G U S T	25	Godsmack	Godsmack	Major Label Debut
A U G U S T	25	Gentleman's Blues	Cracker	-
A U G U S T	25	Hellbilly Deluxe	Rob Zombie	-
A U G U S T	25	Holding This Moment	Bane	Compilation
A U G U S T	25	How Does Your Garden Grow?	Better Than Ezra	-
A U G U S T	25	K.K.K.K.K.	Kahimi Karie	-
A U G U S T	25	The Last Dog and Pony Show	Bob Mould	-
A U G U S T	25	Make It Hot	Nicole Wray	Debut
A U G U S T	25	The Miseducation of Lauryn Hill	Lauryn Hill	Solo Debut
A U G U S T	25	Mo'hogany	Monifah	-
A U G U S T	25	Slow Down	Keb' Mo'	-
A U G U S T	25	The Three Pyramids Club	Suggs	-
A U G U S T	25	Use Your Illusion	Guns N' Roses	Compilation
A U G U S T	25	Villa Elaine	Remy Zero	US
A U G U S T	25	XO	Elliott Smith	
A U G U S T	31	Songs for Polarbears	Snow Patrol	Debut
A U G U S T	31	Fin de Siècle	The Divine Comedy	-
A U G U S T	31	Cruel Summer	Ace of Base	US
A U G U S T	31	Don Cartagena	Fat Joe	-
A U G U S T	31	I Sing the Body Electro	Kurtis Mantronik	-
A U G U S T	31	Kuruption!	Kurupt	-
A U G U S T	31	Precious Falling	Quickspace	-
A U G U S T	31	Swingin' Stampede	Hot Club of Cowtown	-
A U G U S T	31	Tubular Bells III	Mike Oldfield	-
S E P T E M B E R	1	High Mileage	Alan Jackson	-
S E P T E M B E R	1	Pack Up the Cats	Local H	-
S E P T E M B E R	1	Teatro	Willie Nelson	-
S E P T E M B E R	3	Acústico MTV	Rita Lee	Live
S E P T E M B E R	3	Georgia Stomps, Atlanta Struts and Other Contemporary Dance Favorites	John Fahey	Live
S E P T E M B E R	7	The Boy with the Arab Strap	Belle & Sebastian	-
S E P T E M B E R	7	Horkstow Grange	Steeleye Span	-
S E P T E M B E R	7	Internationalist	Powderfinger	-
S E P T E M B E R	7	It Ain't Over...	The Outfield	-
S E P T E M B E R	7	One Night Only	Bee Gees	Live
S E P T E M B E R	7	Six	Mansun	UK
S E P T E M B E R	8	S'il suffisait d'aimer	Celine Dion	Canada
S E P T E M B E R	8	Breath of Heaven: A Christmas Collection	Vince Gill	Christmas
S E P T E M B E R	8	Can-I-Bus	Canibus	-
S E P T E M B E R	8	Celebrity Skin	Hole	-
S E P T E M B E R	8	Hologram of Baal	The Church	-
S E P T E M B E R	8	How It Feels To Be Something On	Sunny Day Real Estate	-
S E P T E M B E R	8	In an Expression of the Inexpressible	Blonde Redhead	-
S E P T E M B E R	8	Our Problem	Iron Monkey	-
S E P T E M B E R	8	These Wicked Streets	Skull Duggery	-
S E P T E M B E R	8	Tin Cans & Car Tires	Moe	-
S E P T E M B E R	8	Whitey Ford Sings the Blues	Everlast	-
S E P T E M B E R	8	Who Got the Gravy?	Digital Underground	-
S E P T E M B E R	9	Frank Black and the Catholics	Frank Black and the Catholics	-
S E P T E M B E R	9	Kakusei	DJ Krush	-
S E P T E M B E R	9	Who Dares Wins	Bolt Thrower	Compilation
S E P T E M B E R	14	This Is My Truth Tell Me Yours	Manic Street Preachers	-
S E P T E M B E R	14	Mystery Disc	Frank Zappa	Compilation
S E P T E M B E R	14	Step One	Steps	-
S E P T E M B E R	15	Bathhouse Betty	Bette Midler	-
S E P T E M B E R	15	The Chemical Wedding	Bruce Dickinson	-
S E P T E M B E R	15	The Christmas Attic	Trans-Siberian Orchestra	Christmas
S E P T E M B E R	15	Jubilation	The Band	-
S E P T E M B E R	15	Mechanical Animals	Marilyn Manson	-
S E P T E M B E R	15	Musical Chairs	Hootie & the Blowfish	-
S E P T E M B E R	15	Rush Hour soundtrack	Various Artists	Soundtrack
S E P T E M B E R	15	Sound of Perseverance	Death	-
S E P T E M B E R	15	This Christmas (I'd Rather Have Love)	Teddy Pendergrass	-
S E P T E M B E R	15	Wasted	L.A. Guns	EP
S E P T E M B E R	15	What Is Not to Love	Imperial Teen	-
S E P T E M B E R	18	Luxury	Fantastic Plastic Machine	-
S E P T E M B E R	20	B'z The Best "Treasure"	B'z	Compilation
S E P T E M B E R	21	Electro-Shock Blues	Eels	UK
S E P T E M B E R	21	Radiation	Marillion	-
S E P T E M B E R	21	Forbidden Dreams: Encore Collection, Vol. 2	Yanni	Compilation
S E P T E M B E R	21	Nightwork	Diabolical Masquerade	-
S E P T E M B E R	21	Riddim Warfare	DJ Spooky	-
S E P T E M B E R	22	Alabama Song	Allison Moorer	-
S E P T E M B E R	22	An Audio Guide to Everyday Atrocity	Nothingface	-
S E P T E M B E R	22	Brothers Gonna Work It Out	The Chemical Brothers	Compilation
S E P T E M B E R	22	Cosas del Amor	Enrique Iglesias	-
S E P T E M B E R	22	Dizzy Up The Girl	Goo Goo Dolls	-
S E P T E M B E R	22	Inquisition Symphony	Apocalyptica	-
S E P T E M B E R	22	Moon Pix	Cat Power	-
S E P T E M B E R	22	The Proximity Effect	Nada Surf	-
S E P T E M B E R	22	Psycho Circus	Kiss	-
S E P T E M B E R	22	Rasassination	Ras Kass	-
S E P T E M B E R	22	Speak of the Devil	Chris Isaak	-
S E P T E M B E R	22	Step Inside This House	Lyle Lovett	-
S E P T E M B E R	22	Still in the Game	Keith Sweat	-
S E P T E M B E R	22	Strictly Diesel	Spineshank	-
S E P T E M B E R	22	Supernatural	dc Talk	-
S E P T E M B E R	22	Timeless Tales (For Changing Times)	Joshua Redman	-
S E P T E M B E R	22	Tip	Finger Eleven	Re-issue
S E P T E M B E R	22	Tomorrow Hit Today	Mudhoney	-
S E P T E M B E R	22	Ultimate Christmas	The Beach Boys	Christmas
S E P T E M B E R	22	www.thug.com	Trick Daddy	-
S E P T E M B E R	22	Queens of the Stone Age	Queens of the Stone Age	-
S E P T E M B E R	23	Arches and Aisles	The Spinanes	-
S E P T E M B E R	28	Legacy of Kings	Hammerfall	-
S E P T E M B E R	28	The Singles 86>98	Depeche Mode	Compilation
S E P T E M B E R	28	Sunday 8PM	Faithless	-
S E P T E M B E R	29	'98 Live Meltdown	Judas Priest	Live
S E P T E M B E R	29	Aquemini	OutKast	-
S E P T E M B E R	29	Dearest Christian, I'm So Very Sorry for Bringing You Here. Love, Dad	P.M. Dawn	-
S E P T E M B E R	29	Deserter's Songs	Mercury Rev	-
S E P T E M B E R	29	¿Dónde Están los Ladrones?	Shakira	-
S E P T E M B E R	29	El Oso	Soul Coughing	-
S E P T E M B E R	29	Enquiring Minds	Gangsta Boo	-
S E P T E M B E R	29	A Fire Inside EP	AFI	EP
S E P T E M B E R	29	Fool's Parade	Peter Wolf	-
S E P T E M B E R	29	Foundation	Brand Nubian	-
S E P T E M B E R	29	The Globe Sessions	Sheryl Crow	-
S E P T E M B E R	29	Is This Desire?	PJ Harvey	-
S E P T E M B E R	29	The Love Movement	A Tribe Called Quest	-
S E P T E M B E R	29	Mos Def & Talib Kweli Are Black Star	Black Star	-
S E P T E M B E R	29	The Pace Is Glacial	Seam	-
S E P T E M B E R	29	Painted from Memory	Elvis Costello and Burt Bacharach	-
S E P T E M B E R	29	Psyence Fiction	Unkle	-
S E P T E M B E R	29	Smitten	Buffalo Tom	-
S E P T E M B E R	29	Taming the Tiger	Joni Mitchell	-
S E P T E M B E R	29	Tony Bennett: The Playground	Tony Bennett	-
S E P T E M B E R	29	Vol. 2... Hard Knock Life	Jay-Z	-
S E P T E M B E R	29	Sonic Origami	Uriah Heep	-

=== October–December ===
Date		Album	Artist	Notes
O C T O B E R	3	Paradise	Bob Sinclar	Debut
O C T O B E R	5	Hits	Phil Collins	Compilation +1 new track
O C T O B E R	5	Northern Sulphuric Soul	Rae & Christian	Debut
O C T O B E R	5	Nu-Clear Sounds	Ash	-
O C T O B E R	5	Symphony of Enchanted Lands	Rhapsody	-
O C T O B E R	6	Against	Sepultura	-
O C T O B E R	6	Christmas Caravan	Squirrel Nut Zippers	Christmas
O C T O B E R	6	Clandestino	Manu Chao	Debut
O C T O B E R	6	Deviate	Kill II This	-
O C T O B E R	6	Cypress Hill IV	Cypress Hill	-
O C T O B E R	6	Guilty 'til Proven Innocent	Prime Suspects	-
O C T O B E R	6	Heaven'z Movie	Bizzy Bone	-
O C T O B E R	6	Hello Rockview	Less Than Jake	-
O C T O B E R	6	John Mellencamp	John Mellencamp	-
O C T O B E R	6	Prolonging the Magic	Cake	-
O C T O B E R	6	The Recipe	Mack 10	-
O C T O B E R	6	Sewn Mouth Secrets	Soilent Green	-
O C T O B E R	6	The Things We Make	Six by Seven	U.S
O C T O B E R	6	Transcendental Highway	Colin Hay	-
O C T O B E R	6	Waste of Mind	Zebrahead	-
O C T O B E R	6	What This Country Needs	Aaron Tippin	-
O C T O B E R	6	Wide Swing Tremolo	Son Volt	-
O C T O B E R	12	Without You I'm Nothing	Placebo	-
O C T O B E R	12	30: Very Best of Deep Purple	Deep Purple	Compilation
O C T O B E R	12	B*Witched	B*Witched	UK
O C T O B E R	12	Blind in Paradise	Takara	-
O C T O B E R	12	Labour of Love III	UB40	Covers
O C T O B E R	12	Much Against Everyone's Advice	Soulwax	-
O C T O B E R	12	Music is Rotted One Note	Squarepusher	-
O C T O B E R	13	The Bootleg Series Vol. 4: Bob Dylan Live 1966, The "Royal Albert Hall" Concert	Bob Dylan	-
O C T O B E R	13	Christmastime	Michael W. Smith	Christmas
O C T O B E R	13	Civil War Fantasy	Altamont	-
O C T O B E R	13	It's a Beautiful Thing	Keith Murray	-
O C T O B E R	13	December	Kenny Loggins	Christmas
O C T O B E R	13	Goddamnit	Alkaline Trio	-
O C T O B E R	13	Magnum Force	Heltah Skeltah	-
O C T O B E R	13	No More Looking over My Shoulder	Travis Tritt	-
O C T O B E R	13	Slam: The Soundtrack	Various Artists	Soundtrack
O C T O B E R	13	Spirit Trail	Bruce Hornsby	-
O C T O B E R	13	Weird Tales	Golden Smog	-
O C T O B E R	17	Themes from William Blake's The Marriage of Heaven and Hell	Ulver	-
O C T O B E R	19	Reunion	Black Sabbath	Live+ 2 new tracks
O C T O B E R	19	You've Come a Long Way, Baby	Fatboy Slim	-
O C T O B E R	19	Out in the Fields – The Very Best of Gary Moore	Gary Moore	Compilation
O C T O B E R	19	Honey to the B	Billie	-
O C T O B E R	19	Hope Is Important	Idlewild	-
O C T O B E R	19	VH1 Storytellers	Ringo Starr	Live
O C T O B E R	19	Gran Turismo	The Cardigans	-
O C T O B E R	20	98° and Rising	98°	-
O C T O B E R	20	Acme	The Jon Spencer Blues Explosion	-
O C T O B E R	20	Aluminum Tunes	Stereolab	Compilation
O C T O B E R	20	American Water	Silver Jews	-
O C T O B E R	20	Everything's Gonna Be Alright	Deana Carter	-
O C T O B E R	20	Gershwin's World	Herbie Hancock	-
O C T O B E R	20	Good Side, Bad Side	Crucial Conflict	-
O C T O B E R	20	In My Life	George Martin	-
O C T O B E R	20	King Biscuit Flower Hour Presents Kansas	Kansas	Live
O C T O B E R	20	A Little South of Sanity	Aerosmith	Live
O C T O B E R	20	Live from the Middle East	The Mighty Mighty Bosstones	Live
O C T O B E R	20	Maybe You've Been Brainwashed Too	New Radicals	-
O C T O B E R	20	Starters Alternators	The Ex	-
O C T O B E R	20	Tape Head	King's X	-
O C T O B E R	20	Wander This World	Jonny Lang	-
O C T O B E R	20	Why Do They Rock So Hard?	Reel Big Fish	-
O C T O B E R	22	Under the Running Board	The Dillinger Escape Plan	EP
O C T O B E R	26	Believe	Cher	UK
O C T O B E R	26	Coup de Grace	The Stranglers	-
O C T O B E R	26	I've Been Expecting You	Robbie Williams	-
O C T O B E R	26	Modernism: A New Decade	The Style Council	Recorded in 1989
O C T O B E R	26	Words from the Exit Wound	Napalm Death	-
O C T O B E R	27	Ghetto Superstar	Pras	-
O C T O B E R	27	Up	R.E.M.	-
O C T O B E R	27	Greatest Hits	Mötley Crüe	Compilation
O C T O B E R	27	1965	The Afghan Whigs	-
O C T O B E R	27	Enter the Dru	Dru Hill	-
O C T O B E R	27	Fairy Tales	Divine	-
O C T O B E R	27	Holiday Songs and Lullabies	Shawn Colvin	-
O C T O B E R	27	Keep the Faith	Faith Evans	-
O C T O B E R	27	Kima, Keisha, and Pam	Total	-
O C T O B E R	27	Merry Christmas...Have a Nice Life	Cyndi Lauper	Christmas
O C T O B E R	27	No Place That Far	Sara Evans	-
O C T O B E R	27	Now That's What I Call Music! (U.S. series)	Various Artists	Compilation
O C T O B E R	27	On a Day Like Today	Bryan Adams	-
O C T O B E R	27	Once in a LIVEtime	Dream Theater	Live
O C T O B E R	27	One Man's Trash	Trey Anastasio	Solo Debut
O C T O B E R	27	Orange Rhyming Dictionary	Jets to Brazil	Debut
O C T O B E R	27	The Shape of Punk to Come	Refused	-
O C T O B E R	27	The Story of the Ghost	Phish	-
O C T O B E R	27	Walking Distance	Robert Earl Keen	-
O C T O B E R	30	These Are Special Times	Celine Dion	Christmas
N O V E M B E R	2	The Best of 1980–1990	U2	Compilation
N O V E M B E R	2	The Masterplan	Oasis	B-Sides Compilation
N O V E M B E R	2	No Security	The Rolling Stones	Live
N O V E M B E R	2	John Lennon Anthology	John Lennon	Box Set
N O V E M B E R	2	The Very Best of Meat Loaf	Meat Loaf	Compilation
N O V E M B E R	2	Roseland NYC Live	Portishead	Live
N O V E M B E R	2	Letting Off the Happiness	Bright Eyes	-
N O V E M B E R	2	Hot Show	Prozzäk	-
N O V E M B E R	3	400 Degreez	Juvenile	-
N O V E M B E R	3	BBC Sessions	The Specials	Compilation
N O V E M B E R	3	Belly	Various Artists	Soundtrack
N O V E M B E R	3	Greatest	Duran Duran	Compilation
N O V E M B E R	3	It's Hard to Find a Friend	Pedro the Lion	-
N O V E M B E R	3	Live	311	Live
N O V E M B E R	3	Live from Albertane	Hanson	Live
N O V E M B E R	3	Milkman	Phranc	-
N O V E M B E R	3	Mutations	Beck	-
N O V E M B E R	3	Quantity Is Job 1	Five Iron Frenzy	EP
N O V E M B E R	3	Rafi's Revenge	Asian Dub Foundation	-
N O V E M B E R	3	Supposed Former Infatuation Junkie	Alanis Morissette	-
N O V E M B E R	9	Ladies & Gentlemen: The Best of George Michael	George Michael	Compilation
N O V E M B E R	9	Eden	Sarah Brightman	-
N O V E M B E R	9	How to Measure a Planet?	The Gathering	-
N O V E M B E R	9	OK	Talvin Singh	Debut
N O V E M B E R	9	Voice of an Angel	Charlotte Church	-
N O V E M B E R	10	Awesome God: A Tribute to Rich Mullins	Various Artists	Rich Mullins Tribute
N O V E M B E R	10	Believe	Cher	US
N O V E M B E R	10	Different Stages	Rush	Live
N O V E M B E R	10	Chaosphere	Meshuggah	-
N O V E M B E R	10	Hits	Spice 1	Compilation
N O V E M B E R	10	Home for Christmas	NSYNC	Christmas
N O V E M B E R	10	Let It Happen	MxPx	Compilation
N O V E M B E R	10	Look Forward to Failure	The Ataris	EP
N O V E M B E R	10	Manilow Sings Sinatra	Barry Manilow	Covers album
N O V E M B E R	10	Mercenary	Bolt Thrower	-
N O V E M B E R	10	The Nerve Agents	The Nerve Agents	EP
N O V E M B E R	10	R.	R. Kelly	2x CD
N O V E M B E R	10	Rhythm-al-ism	DJ Quik	-
N O V E M B E R	10	The Salesman and Bernadette	Vic Chestnutt	-
N O V E M B E R	10	Steal This Album	The Coup	-
N O V E M B E R	10	Tie One On	The Bouncing Souls	Live EP
N O V E M B E R	10	Tracks	Bruce Springsteen	Box Set
N O V E M B E R	11	The Sound of '70s	Yoshinori Sunahara	-
N O V E M B E R	13	Byzantium	Deep Blue Something	-
N O V E M B E R	15	One Time For Your Mind	1TYM	-
N O V E M B E R	16	Human Being	Seal	-
N O V E M B E R	16	Ludwig's Law	Moebius Plank Thompson	-
N O V E M B E R	16	Resurrection	E-17	-
N O V E M B E R	16	The Winter Album	NSYNC	Christmas
N O V E M B E R	17	100% Colombian	Fun Lovin' Criminals	-
N O V E M B E R	17	Americana	The Offspring	-
N O V E M B E R	17	Double Live	Garth Brooks	2x CD; Live
N O V E M B E R	17	Da Good da Bad & da Ugly	Geto Boys	-
N O V E M B E R	17	My Love Is Your Love	Whitney Houston	-
N O V E M B E R	17	#1's	Mariah Carey	Compilation +4 new songs
N O V E M B E R	17	The Prince of Egypt: Music from the Original Motion Picture Soundtrack	Various Artists	Soundtrack
N O V E M B E R	17	Six the Hard Way	Suicidal Tendencies	EP
N O V E M B E R	17	Spirit	Jewel	-
N O V E M B E R	17	Sublime Acoustic: Bradley Nowell & Friends	Sublime	-
N O V E M B E R	17	Tical 2000: Judgement Day	Method Man	-
N O V E M B E R	17	War & Peace Vol. 1 (The War Disc)	Ice Cube	-
N O V E M B E R	18	Believe	Savatage	Compilation
N O V E M B E R	18	Functioning on Impatience	Coalesce	-
N O V E M B E R	20	The Question	The Slackers	-
N O V E M B E R	21	Ja, Zoo	hide with Spread Beaver	-
N O V E M B E R	23	Now That's What I Call Music! 41 (UK series)	Various Artists	Compilation
N O V E M B E R	24	Bobby Digital in Stereo	RZA	Solo debut
N O V E M B E R	24	Chef Aid: The South Park Album	Various Artists	Soundtrack
N O V E M B E R	24	The Collection Volume One	Bone Thugs-n-Harmony	Compilation
N O V E M B E R	24	Doc's da Name 2000	Redman	-
N O V E M B E R	24	El Chupacabra	Soil	EP
N O V E M B E R	24	Garage Inc.	Metallica	Covers album
N O V E M B E R	24	Greatest Hits	2Pac	2xCD; Compilation + unreleased tracks
N O V E M B E R	24	Let's Talk About Feelings	Lagwagon	-
N O V E M B E R	24	Live on Two Legs	Pearl Jam	Live
N O V E M B E R	24	Tim's Bio: Life from da Bassment	Timbaland	-
N O V E M B E R	24	Who Cares a Lot? The Greatest Hits	Faith No More	Compilation
N O V E M B E R	27	Hey! Album	Marvelous 3	-
N O V E M B E R	27	White Ladder	David Gray	-
N O V E M B E R	30	2 Future 4 U	Armand van Helden	-
N O V E M B E R	30	Intimate and Live	Kylie Minogue	Live
D E C E M B E R	3	As Friends Rust / Discount	As Friends Rust / Discount	EP
D E C E M B E R	7	Oceanborn	Nightwish	-
D E C E M B E R	8	Built to Last	Maestro	-
D E C E M B E R	15	E.L.E. (Extinction Level Event): The Final World Front	Busta Rhymes	-
D E C E M B E R	15	Ghetto Fabulous	Mystikal	-
D E C E M B E R	15	The Professional	DJ Clue	-
D E C E M B E R	18	The Legend of Zelda The Ocarina of Time Original Soundtrack	Koji Kondo	-
D E C E M B E R	22	Flesh of My Flesh, Blood of My Blood	DMX	-
D E C E M B E R	27	Truth	Talisman	-
D E C E M B E R	29	The Remix Album	All Saints	Remix
D E C E M B E R	29	Evanescence	Evanescence	Debut/EP
D E C E M B E R	?	Skin Stripper	Vomitorial Corpulence	-

=== Release date unknown ===
- Teenage Hate – The Reatards
- Va Va Voom – Cinerama

== Biggest hit singles ==
The following singles achieved the highest aggregated chart positions in 1998, according to TsorT.

#	Artist	Title	Year	Country	Chart entries
1	Celine Dion	My Heart Will Go On	1997	(Canada)	UK 1 – Feb 1998; US BB 1 of 1998; Netherlands 1 – Jan 1998; Sweden 1 – Feb 1998; Austria 1 – Feb 1998; Switzerland 1 – Jan 1998; Norway 1 – Feb 1998; Germany 1 – Jan 1998; Republic of Ireland 1 – Feb 1998; Australia 1 for 4 weeks Apr 1998; Oscar in 1997; Grammy in 1998; Poland 2 – Jan 1998; Australia 3 of 1998; Italy 4 of 1998; Germany 7 of the 1990s; Global 7 (10 M sold) – 1997; POP 9 of 1998; Europe 14 of the 1990s; AFI 14; US BB 24 of 1998; Party 48 of 1999; Scrobulate 67 of soundtrack; OzNet 162; RIAA 246; Acclaimed 1784
2	Cher	Believe	1998	(United States)	UK 1 – Oct 1998; US BB 1 of 1999; Netherlands 1 – Nov 1998; Sweden 1 – Nov 1998; Switzerland 1 – Nov 1998; Norway 1 – Jan 1998; Germany 1 – Jan 1999; Republic of Ireland 1 – Nov 1998; New Zealand 1 for 1 weeks Jan 1999; Australia 1 for 5 weeks May 1999; Austria 2 – Nov 1998; Poland 2 – Nov 1998; Italy 2 of 1999; Global 7 (10 M sold) – 1998; US BB 8 of 1999; POP 8 of 1999; Scrobulate 10 of gay; Australia 14 of 1999; Germany 31 of the 1990s; Europe 72 of the 1990s; OzNet 252; Acclaimed 1839
3	Aerosmith	I Don't Want to Miss a Thing	1998	(United States)	US BB 1 of 1998; Sweden 1 – Aug 1998; Austria 1 – Aug 1998; Switzerland 1 – Aug 1998; Norway 1 – Aug 1998; Italy 1 of 1998; Germany 1 – Jul 1998; Republic of Ireland 1 – Oct 1998; Australia 1 for 9 weeks Jan 1999; POP 1 of 1998; US BB 2 of 1998; Australia 2 of 1998; Netherlands 3 – Aug 1998; UK 4 – Sep 1998; Poland 4 – Jul 1998; Scrobulate 26 of soundtrack; Party 52 of 2007; Germany 71 of the 1990s; Europe 80 of the 1990s; RYM 100 of 1998; OzNet 974
4	Run-DMC & Jason Nevins	It's Like That	1998	(United States)	UK 1 – Mar 1998; Netherlands 1 – Dec 1997; Switzerland 1 – Dec 1997; Norway 1 – Feb 1998; Germany 1 – Jan 1998; Republic of Ireland 1 – Mar 1998; New Zealand 1 for 2 weeks May 1998; Australia 1 for 1 weeks May 1998; Austria 2 – Jan 1998; Australia 4 of 1998; Sweden 6 – Jan 1998; RYM 29 of 1983; Italy 31 of 1997; Poland 33 – Feb 1998; Germany 34 of the 1990s; Acclaimed 1050
5	Shania Twain	You're Still The One	1998	(Canada)	US Country 1 – May 2; 1998; US Country Sales 1 – May 1998; US Adult 1- May 1998; Australia 1- May 10; 1998; Canada 1- March 1998; Philippines 1 – April 1998; US BB 2 – May 23; 1998; Canada RPM 2 – March 1998; US Dance 3- May 1998; US BB Top 40 3 – June 1998; Taiwan 4 – May 1998; US Adult Top 40 6- April 1998; Japan 16 – May 1998; Dutch 10 – May 1998; Belgium 16 – June 1998; The Biggest Hit in Country Music in 1998 winning Best selling Country Single; Song of the Year; Music Video of the Year; Single of the Year in all Country Music awards; and 2 Grammy Award for Best Country Song and Best Female Country Performance in 1998.

== Top 40 Chart hit singles ==
Song title	Artist(s)	Release date(s)	US	UK	Highest chart position	Other Chart Performance(s)
"3AM"	Matchbox Twenty	January 1998	3	64	1 (Canada)	See chart performance entry

=== Other Chart hit singles ===
- "3 A.M." – Matchbox Twenty (#1 CAN)
- "All Around the World" – Oasis (#1 UK)
- "All 'Bout the Money" – Meja
- "All I Have to Give" – Backstreet Boys (#1 SP, #2 UK, #3 CAN)
- "All My Life" – K-Ci & JoJo (#1 AUS, NLD, NZ, #1 US)
- "All That I Need" – Boyzone (#1 IRL, UK, TAI)
- "The Angel and the Gambler" - Iron Maiden (#3 IT, FIN)
- "Angels" – Robbie Williams (#2 IRL, #4 SWI, UK, #6 BE)
- "Angels Crying" – E-Type (#2 FIN, SWE, NOR)
- "Another One Bites The Dust" – Queen, Wyclef Jean, Pras & Free (#5 UK, #9 NZ)
- "Are You That Somebody?" – Aaliyah & Timbaland (#1 NZ, #3 NLD, #6 CAN)
- "Ava Adore" – The Smashing Pumpkins (#1 ICE, #2 GR)
- "Baby Don't Go" – Close II You (#4 NL)
- "...Baby One More Time" – Britney Spears (#1 US, AUS, AUT, BE, CAN, CZ, DEN, FIN, FR, GER, IRL, IT, NLD, NZ, NOR, SWE, SWI, UK)
- "Bailando" – Loona (#1 GER, SWI, #3 AUT)
- "Bamboogie" - Bamboo (#2 UK)
- "Be Careful" – Sparkle & R. Kelly (#3 US, #4 NLD, #7 UK)
- "Because We Want To" – Billie (#1 UK, #5 BE, #8 SWE)
- "Believe" – Cher
- "Big Big World" – Emilia Rydberg (#1 AUT, BE, GER, NLD, NOR, SP, SWE, SWI)
- "Big Mistake" – Natalie Imbruglia (#2 UK, #5 SP, #6 AUS)
- "Blue Angels" – Pras & The Product G&B (#6 UK)
- "Bootie Call" – All Saints (#1 UK, #5 NLD, #9 IRL)
- "The Boy Is Mine" – Brandy & Monica
- "Brother Louie '98" – Modern Talking
- "Calcutta (Taxi Taxi Taxi)" – Dr. Bombay (#1 Sweden)
- "Carnaval de Paris" – Dario G
- "C'est La Vie" – B*Witched (#1 IRE, UK)
- "Changes" – 2Pac
- "Chanter pour ceux qui sont loin de chez eux" – Lââm (#1 BEL, #2 FRA)
- "Chocolate Salty Balls" – Chef
- "Cleopatra's Theme" – Cleopatra
- "Closing Time" – Semisonic
- "Cloud Number Nine" – Bryan Adams
- "Come with Me" – Puff Daddy & Jimmy Page
- "Cose della vita" – Eros Ramazzotti & Tina Turner
- "Crazy Little Party Girl" – Aaron Carter
- "Cruel Summer" – Ace of Base
- "Crush" – Jennifer Paige
- "The Cup of Life" – Ricky Martin
- "Daydreamin'" – Tatyana Ali
- "Daysleeper" – R.E.M.
- "Deeper Underground" – Jamiroquai
- "Diva" – Dana International (#2 BE; #3 SWE; #7 FIN)
- "Doctor Jones" – Aqua
- "DooDah!" – Cartoons (#3 DEN; #5 NE; #7 UK)
- "Doo Wop (That Thing)" – Lauryn Hill
- "Dragula" – Rob Zombie
- "Dreams" - The Corrs
- "Drowned World/Substitute for Love" – Madonna
- "Ein Schwein namens Männer" – Die Ärzte (#1 OST, DE, SWI)
- "End of the Line" – Honeyz (#5 UK)
- "Everybody (Backstreet's Back)" – Backstreet Boys
- "Everybody Get Up" – Five
- "Faith" – Limp Bizkit
- "Feel It" – The Tamperer featuring Maya
- "Finally Found" – Honeyz
- "The First Night" – Monica
- "Flugzeuge im Bauch" – Oli.P
- "Fly Away" – Lenny Kravitz
- "Found a Cure" - Ultra Naté
- "Freak Me" – Another Level
- "Freak On A Leash" – Korn
- "From This Moment On" – Shania Twain
- "Frozen" – Madonna
- "Gettin' Jiggy wit It" – Will Smith
- "Ghetto Supastar (That Is What You Are)" – Pras& Mýa & Ol' Dirty Bastard
- "Gimme Love" – Alexia
- "Girlfriend" – Billie
- "Given to Fly" – Pearl Jam (#6 NOR, ES)
- "God Is a DJ" – Faithless
- "Gone till November" – Wyclef Jean
- "Good Riddance (Time of Your Life)" – Green Day
- "Goodbye" – Spice Girls
- "Got the Feelin'" – Five
- "Gym and Tonic" – Spacedust
- "Hard Knock Life (Ghetto Anthem)" – Jay-Z
- "Heartbeat / Tragedy" – Steps
- "Here I Go Again" – E-Type (#1 SWE)
- "High" – Lighthouse Family (#1 AUS; #4 UK)
- "Hijo de la Luna" – Loona
- "Horny '98" – Mousse T.
- "How Deep Is Your Love" – Dru Hill (#3 US)
- "How Much Is the Fish?" – Scooter (#1 Belgium; #2 Finland; #3 Germany)
- "I Don't Want to Miss a Thing" – Aerosmith
- "I Don't Want to Wait" – Paula Cole
- "If You Buy This Record (Your Life Will Be Better)" – The Tamperer featuring Maya (#3 UK; #4 IT)
- "If You Could Read My Mind" – Stars on 54
- "If You Tolerate This Your Children Will Be Next" – Manic Street Preachers
- "I Get Lonely" – Janet Jackson
- "I Love the Way You Love Me" – Boyzone (#1 NZ, #2 UK)
- "I Want to Spend My Lifetime Loving You" – Tina Arena and Marc Anthony
- "I Want You Back" – Melanie Brown & Missy Elliott
- "I Want You Back" – NSYNC
- "I Wish" – Oliver Petszokat (#2 DE, #3 AT, #7 CH)
- "I'm Your Angel" – Céline Dion & R. Kelly (#1 US, #3 UK)
- "Immortality" – Celine Dion & Bee Gees
- "Intergalactic" – Beastie Boys (#2 ICE, #4 NZ)
- "Insane" – Texas
- "Inside Out" – Eve 6
- "Iris" – Goo Goo Dolls (#1 AUS, CAN, IT)
- "It's like That" – Run-D.M.C. & Jason Nevins
- "It's Tricky" – Run-D.M.C. and Jason Nevins
- "Jumper" – Third Eye Blind
- "Just the Two of Us" – Will Smith
- "Kind & Generous" – Natalie Merchant
- "Kung Fu Fighting" – Bus Stop & Carl Douglas
- "La Primavera" – Sash!
- "La Tribu de Dana" – Manau
- "Last Thing on My Mind" – Steps
- "Lately" – Divine
- "Let the Music Heal Your Soul" – Bravo All Stars
- "Life" – Des'ree
- "Life Is a Flower" – Ace of Base
- "Lilali" – Kim Kay
- "Lollipop (Candyman)" – Aqua
- "Looking for Love" – Karen Ramirez
- "Lords of the Boards" – Guano Apes
- "Lullaby" – Shawn Mullins
- "Make 'Em Say Uhh!" – Master P & Fiend, Silkk The Shocker, Mia X, Mystikal
- "Miami" – Will Smith
- "Millennium" – Robbie Williams
- "Move Mania" - Sash!
- "Music Sounds Better with You" – Stardust
- "My All" – Mariah Carey
- "My Friend (So Long)" – DC Talk
- "My Heart Will Go On" – Celine Dion
- "My Hero" – Foo Fighters
- "Mysterious Times" – Sash! (#5 IT, NOR, #6 DEN)
- "Narcotic" – Liquido
- "Never Ever" – All Saints
- "Nice & Slow" – Usher
- "No Matter What" – Boyzone
- "No Regrets" - Robbie Williams
- "Not About Us" – Genesis
- "One for Sorrow" – Steps
- "One Week" – Barenaked Ladies
- "Only When I Lose Myself" – Depeche Mode
- "Out of the Dark" – Falco
- "Outside" – George Michael
- "The Power of Good-Bye" – Madonna
- "Psycho Circus" – Kiss (#4 SWE)
- "Push It" – Garbage
- "Ray of Light" – Madonna
- "Real World" – Matchbox Twenty
- "Remember the Time" – Nana
- "Renegade Master '89" – Wildchild
- "The Rockafeller Skank" – Fatboy Slim
- "Rollercoaster" – B*Witched
- "Save Tonight" – Eagle-Eye Cherry
- "Say It Once" – Ultra
- "Say What You Want (All Day, Every Day)" – Texas & Wu-Tang Clan
- "Searchin' My Soul" - Vonda Shepard
- "Sex and Candy" – Marcy Playground
- "Şımarık" – Tarkan
- "Slam Dunk (Da Funk)" - Five
- "Slide" – Goo Goo Dolls
- "Someone Loves You Honey" – Lutricia McNeal
- "Stand by Me" – 4 The Cause
- "Still Not a Player" – Big Pun & Joe
- "Stop" – Spice Girls
- "Stranded" – Lutricia McNeal
- "Sweetest Thing" – U2
- "Take Me There" – Blackstreet & Mýa
- "Teardrop" – Massive Attack
- "Thank U" – Alanis Morissette
- "Thinking of You" - Hanson
- "This Is How We Party" – S.O.A.P.
- "This Kiss" – Faith Hill
- "Time After Time" - INOJ
- "To You I Belong" – B*Witched
- "Together Again" – Janet Jackson
- "Too Close" – Next
- "Too Much" – Spice Girls
- "Too Much Heaven" – Nana
- "Top of the World" – Brandy
- "Torn" – Natalie Imbruglia
- "Touch It" – Monifah
- "Truly Madly Deeply" – Savage Garden
- "Turn Back Time" – Aqua
- "Turn It Up (remix)/Fire It Up" – Busta Rhymes
- "Turn the Page" – Metallica
- "Under the Bridge / Lady Marmalade" – All Saints
- "Unforgivable Sinner" – Lene Marlin
- "The Unforgiven II" – Metallica
- "Uninvited" – Alanis Morissette
- "Until the Time Is Through" – Five
- "Up and Down" – Vengaboys
- "Vill ha dig" – Drömhus
- "Viva Forever" – Spice Girls
- "Vivo per lei (je vis pour elle)" – Hélène Ségara & Andrea Bocelli
- "Wanna Get Up" – 2 Unlimited
- "The Way" – Fastball
- "We Like To Party" – Vengaboys
- "Weird" – Hanson
- "Westside" – TQ
- "What Can I Do?" – The Corrs
- "What Can I Do?" (Remix) – The Corrs & Tin Tin Out
- "What's Your Sign?" – Des'ree
- "When the Lights Go Out" – Five
- "When the Rain Begins to Fall" – Pappa Bear & Van der Toorn
- "When You Believe (Movie Version)" – Michelle Pfeiffer & Sally Dworsky
- "When You're Gone" – Bryan Adams & Melanie C
- "Whiskey in the Jar" – Metallica
- "Witch Doctor" – Cartoons (#2 UK, #9 BE)
- "Would You...?" – Touch and Go (#2 IT, #3 UK, #4 NZ, SWI)
- "Yakalelo" – Nomads
- "You're a Superstar" – Love Inc.
- "You're My Heart, You're My Soul '98" – Modern Talking (#2 AUT, GER, #3 FR, #4 SWI)
- "You're Still the One" – Shania Twain
- "Zora Sourit" – Celine Dion

== Notable singles ==
Song title	Artist(s)	Release date(s)	Other Chart Performance(s)
"Ava Adore"	The Smashing Pumpkins	May 1998	See chart performance entry

== Classical music ==
- Leonardo Balada – Folk Dreams (Three Pieces for Orchestra)
- Osvaldas Balakauskas – Symphony No. 4
- Louis Andriessen – Writing to Vermeer
- John Barry – The Beyondness of Things
- George Crumb – Mundus Canis (A Dog's World) for guitar and percussion
- Mario Davidovsky – String Quartet No. 5
- Ludovico Einaudi – Arie
- Lorenzo Ferrero – A Red Wedding Dress, for organ
- Beat Furrer
  - Still for ensemble
  - Spur for piano and string quartet
- Philip Glass – Days and Nights in Rocinha, for orchestra
- Georg Friedrich Haas
  - Concerto for violin and orchestra
  - String Quartet No. 2
- Jake Heggie – Sophie's Song
- Wojciech Kilar – What a piece of work is a man, movie theme from “A Week in the Life of a Man”
- Frederik Magle – Cantata to Saint Cecilia
- Gordon McPherson – Miami
- Hans Otte – Stundenbuch for piano
- Zbigniew Preisner – Requiem for My Friend
- Einojuhani Rautavaara – Piano Concerto No. 3 Gift of Dreams
- Vache Sharafyan – The Sun, the Wine and the Wind of Time, for duduk, violin, cello and piano
- Juan Maria Solare – Spaghettisssimo
- Morton Subotnick – Echoes from the Silent Call of Girona

== Opera ==
- Mark Adamo – Little Women
- Christopher Butterfield – Zurich 1916
- Philip Glass – White Raven
- Heinz Holliger – Schneewittchen
- Constantine Koukias – The Divine Kiss
- Ryan Ostrander – Madame Butterfly

== Musical theater ==
- March 5 – The Boy from Oz, Sydney production opened.
- Notre-Dame de Paris – musical
- Cabaret (Kander and Ebb) – Broadway revival
- Footloose – Broadway production opened at the Richard Rodgers Theatre and ran for 709 performances
- Hedwig and the Angry Inch (Stephen Trask) – off Broadway production
- High Society – Broadway production opened at the St James Theatre and ran for 144 performances
- Ragtime – Broadway production at the Ford Center for the Performing Arts and ran for 834 performances
- The Sound of Music (Rodgers & Hammerstein) – Broadway revival

== Musical films ==
- Blues Brothers 2000
- Meeting People Is Easy
- Mulan
- The Prince of Egypt
- Velvet Goldmine
- Why Do Fools Fall in Love

== Births ==
- January 4 – Coco Jones, American actress and singer
- January 11 – Louisa Johnson, English singer-songwriter
- January 14 – Brunzyn, Dutch rapper
- January 16 – Seungkwan, South Korean singer (Seventeen)
- January 22
  - Silentó, American rapper, singer-songwriter, record producer, and actor
  - Biig Piig, Irish singer and rapper
- January 23 – XXXTentacion, American rapper and singer-songwriter (d. 2018)
- January 24 – Jay Versace, American record producer
- January 27 – Albina Kelmendi, Kosovo-Albanian singer
- January 29 – Mion Mukaichi, Japanese girl group singer
- February 7 – Angelique Sabrina, Bahamian singer, songwriter, dancer, actress and performer
- February 11 – Khalid, American singer-songwriter
- February 18 – Vernon, South Korean and American rapper, singer and songwriter (Seventeen)
- February 19 – Chappell Roan, American singer-songwriter, activist and musician
- February 20
  - Corbin, American singer-songwriter and record producer
  - Gracey (singer), English singer
- February 24 - Mike Sabath, American record producer, songwriter, and musician
- March 5 - Noam Bettan, Israeli singer
- March 24 - Ethel Cain, American singer-songwriter, artist and producer
- April 2 - Peach PRC, Australian pop singer, songwriter, social media personality, and performer
- April 3
  - Paris Jackson, American actor, singer, dancer, musician, activist and model (daughter of Michael Jackson)
  - Seonghwa, South Korean singer, model and actor (Ateez)
- April 18 – Aries, American rapper, singer, and record producer
- April 20 – Felix Mallard, Australian musician, actor and model
- April 21 – Zé Felipe, Brazilian singer
- April 23 – Jeffrey Ngai, Hong Kong singer, actor and model
- May 4 – Rex Orange County, English singer-songwriter and musician
- May 21 - Ari Ólafsson, Icelandic singer
- May 22 - Gretta Ray, Australian singer-songwriter
- May 25 – Andrew Lambrou, Australian singer
- May 28 – Dahyun, South Korean singer (TWICE)
- May 28 – Riho Sayashi, Japanese actress, dancer and singer (Morning Musume)
- May 29 – Cochise, American rapper
- June 4 – Central Cee, British rapper and songwriter
- June 5 - Dave, British rapper and actor
- June 18 – Patricia Janečková, German-born Czech soprano (died 2023)
- June 24 – Tana Mongeau, American rapper and internet personality
- June 26 – Cuco, American singer-songwriter
- July 1 – Chloe Bailey of Chloe x Halle, American singer and actress
- July 8
  - Jaden Smith, American actor, rapper, singer and songwriter (son of Will Smith and Jada Pinkett Smith, brother of Willow Smith)
  - Maya Hawke, American actress, model and singer-songwriter (daughter of Ethan Hawke and Uma Thurman)
- July 15 – Kailee Morgue, American singer-songwriter, activist
- July 18 – Luísa Sonza, Brazilian singer-songwriter
- July 21 – Maggie Lindemann, American singer-songwriter
- July 23 – Houdini, Canadian rapper
- July 28 – Risa Watanabe, Japanese idol and model
- August 2 – Cai Xukun, Chinese singer
- August 4 – Lil Skies, American rapper
- August 8 – Shawn Mendes, Canadian musician, singer-songwriter, voice actor and model
- August 9 – ooes, Russian singer–songwriter
- August 11 – Nadia Azzi, American classical pianist
- August 14 – Doechii, American rapper and singer
- August 18 – Clairo, American singer-songwriter and electropop recording artist
- August 25
  - Abraham Mateo, Spanish singer and actor
  - China Anne McClain, American singer and actress
- August 26 – Soyeon, Korean rapper, songwriter, record producer, and member of (G)I-dle
- August 29 – Bizarrap, Argentine DJ and record producer
- September 6 – Kayan9896, Hong Kong singer, actress and model
- September 9 – Dara, Bulgarian singer
- September 13 – Satoshi, Moldovan singer
- September 15 – Kevinho, Brazilian singer
- September 25 – mallrat, Australian musician
- October 5 – Janani K. Jha, Indian-American singer-songwriter and producer
- October 22 – Roddy Ricch, American rapper
- October 23
  - Emily Ann Roberts, American country singer
  - Amandla Stenberg, American singer and actress
- October 24 – Daya, American singer-songwriter
- October 25 – Lee Know, South Korean singer and dancer (Stray Kids)
- October 28 – Ellie Drennan, Australian singer-songwriter, The Voice Australia winner of series 4, Jessie J was her coach
- November 1 - Rachel Chinouriri, English singer-songwriter
- November 7 - Hongjoong, South Korean rapper, singer, producer, and songwriter, and member of Ateez
- November 12 – Selah Marley, American model and singer
- November 16 – Bárbara Tinoco, Portuguese singer
- November 23
  - Just Sam, American singer
  - Emily Keener, American singer-songwriter'
- November 28 - UPSAHL, American singer-songwriter and multi-instrumentalist
- December 2 – Juice WRLD, American singer, rapper, and songwriter (d. 2019)
- December 5 – Conan Gray, American musician
- December 9 – Famke Louise, Dutch YouTuber, model and singer
- December 15 – Cavetown, British musician and activist
- December 19
  - Frans Jeppsson Wall, Swedish singer-songwriter
  - King Princess, American multi instrumentalist, singer-songwriter, activist and record producer
- December 21 - Lexie Liu, Chinese singer, rapper and songwriter
- December 22
  - Latto, American rapper
  - Mizyu, Japanese singer, and member o Atarashii Gakko!
- December 23 – Søren Torpegaard Lund, Danish singer
- December 24 – Declan McKenna, English singer-songwriter and musician

== Deaths ==
- January 2 – Nik Venet, record producer, 61 (Burkitt's lymphoma)
- January 4 – Mae Questel, singer and actress, the voice of Betty Boop, Olive Oyl, Little Audrey & Little Lulu, 89
- January 5 – Sonny Bono, singer and songwriter, 63 (skiing accident)
- January 7 – Owen Bradley, record producer, 82
- January 8 – Sir Michael Tippett, composer, 93
- January 11 – Klaus Tennstedt, conductor, 71
- January 15 – Junior Wells, harmonica player, 64
- January 17 – Junior Kimbrough, blues guitarist and singer, 67
- January 19 – Carl Perkins, singer 65, complications following a series of strokes
- January 22 – Anselmo Sacasas, jazz pianist and bandleader, 85
- January 24 – Justin Tubb, country music singer and songwriter, 62
- January 26
  - Orlando DiGirolamo, jazz accordionist, pianist, composer, and teacher, 73 (car accident)
  - Shinichi Suzuki, violinist and inventor of the international Suzuki method of music education, 99
- February 3 – Fat Pat, American rapper 27 (shot)
- February 5
  - Tim Kelly, guitarist (Slaughter), 35 (car accident)
  - Nick Webb, jazz guitarist, 43 or 44 (pancreatic cancer)
- February 6
  - Carl Wilson, The Beach Boys, 51 (lung cancer)
  - Falco, rock star, 40 (car accident)
- February 10 – Alex Kramer, Canadian songwriter, 94
- February 13 – Thomas Chapin, composer and saxophonist, 40 (leukemia)
- February 17 – Bob Merrill, songwriter, 76 (suicide)
- February 19 – Grandpa Jones, star of Hee Haw, comedian and musician, 84
- February 25 – Rockin' Sidney, soul musician, 59
- February 28 – Todd Duncan, first Porgy in Porgy and Bess, 95
- March 8 – Roger Christian, The Christians
- March 13 – Judge Dread, ska and reggae performer, 52 (heart attack on stage)
- March 15 – Tim Maia, Brazilian singer and songwriter, 55
- March 29 – Nada Tončić, operatic soprano, 88
- March 31 – Joel Ryce-Menuhin, pianist, 64
- April 1 – Rozz Williams, founder of Christian Death, suicide (hanging)
- April 2 – Rob Pilatus, member of Milli Vanilli, 32 (accidental overdose)
- April 4 – Pierre Lantier, pianist and composer, 87
- April 5 – Cozy Powell, drummer for Rainbow and Black Sabbath, 50 (car accident)
- April 6 – Tammy Wynette, country singer, 55
- April 7 – Wendy O. Williams, Plasmatics, 48 (suicide)
- April 9 – Tom Cora, cellist and composer, 44
- April 11 – Lillian Briggs, US singer and trombonist, 65 (lung cancer)
- April 15 – Rose Maddox, country singer, 72
- April 17 – Linda McCartney, rock photographer, keyboard player (Wings) and entrepreneur, wife of Paul McCartney, 56 (breast cancer)
- May 2 – Hideto "Hide" Matsumoto, Japanese rock artist, 33, (hanging, apparently accidental)
- May 5 – Tommy McCook, Jamaican saxophonist, 71
- May 7 – Eddie Rabbitt, country singer, 56, lung cancer
- May 9 – Alice Faye, actress and singer, 83
- May 10
  - Lester Butler, blues harmonica player and singer, 38 (drug overdose)
  - Clara Rockmore, thereminist and violinist, 87
- May 11 – Willy Corsari, singer and composer (100)
- May 14 – Frank Sinatra, singer and actor, 82 (heart attack)
- May 19 – Dorothy Donegan, jazz pianist, 76
- May 20 – Robert Normann, Norwegian jazz guitarist, 81
- May 22 – Royce Kendall, country musician, 62
- June 2 – Ricky Hyslop, violinist, conductor, composer, and arranger, 83
- June 8 – Harry Lookofsky, jazz violinist, 84
- June 10 – Steve Sanders, the Oak Ridge Boys, 45, suicide
- June 25 – Lounès Matoub, assassinated
- July 3 – George Lloyd, British composer, 85
- July 6 – Roy Rogers, actor and singer, 86
- July 14 – Herman David Koppel, pianist and composer, 89
- July 21 – O'Landa Draper, O'Landa Draper and the Associates (gospel choir), 34 (renal failure)
- July 23 – André Gertler, violinist, 90
- July 28 – Olga De Blanck Martín, pianist, guitarist and composer, 62
- August 3 – Alfred Schnittke, composer, 63
- August 11 – Benny Waters, jazz saxophonist and clarinetist, 96
- August 19
  - Ilva Ligabue, operatic soprano, 66
  - Sylvia Stahlman, operatic soprano, 69
- August 22 – Sergio Fiorentino, pianist, 70
- August 24 – Gene Page, arranger, producer and conductor, 58
- August 25 – Lamar Crowson, pianist, 72
- August 29 – Charlie Feathers, country blues musician, 66
- September 4 – Lal Waterson, folk singer-songwriter, 55
- September 9 – Habib Hassan Touma, composer and ethnomusicologist, 63
- September 14 – Johnny Adams, blues, jazz and gospel singer, 66
- September 18 – Charlie Foxx, R & B and soul musician, 58 (leukemia)
- September 26 – Betty Carter, jazz singer, 69 (cancer)
- September 30 – Pavel Štěpán, pianist, 73
- October 1 – Pauline Julien, Canadian singer-songwriter and actress, 60
- October 2 – Gene Autry, actor and country singer, 91
- October 5 – Jacques Abram, pianist, 83
- October 7 – Arnold Jacobs, American tuba player and educator, 83
- October 8 – Anatol Vieru, composer, 82
- October 14 – Frankie Yankovic, America's "Polka King", 83
- October 17 – Antonio Agri, violinist, conductor and composer, 66
- October 25 – Warren Wiebe, "Soulful Rain Man", vocalist and session artist, 45 (suicide)
- November 8
  - Consuelo Villalon Aleman, pianist, 91
  - Lonnie Pitchford, blues musician, 43 (AIDS)
- November 12 – Kenny Kirkland, jazz keyboardist, 43 (congestive heart failure)
- November 20 – Roland Alphonso, saxophonist, 67
- November 27 – Barbara Acklin, soul singer, 55
- December 4 – Egil Johansen, jazz drummer, 64.
- December 11 – Lynn Strait, (Snot), 30 (car accident)
- December 21
  - Avril Coleridge-Taylor, pianist, conductor and composer, 95
  - Karl Denver, Scottish singer, 67
- December 25 – Bryan MacLean, singer, guitarist and songwriter (Love), 52 (heart attack)
- December 30 – Johnny Moore, R & B singer, 64

== Awards ==
- The following artists are inducted into the Rock and Roll Hall of Fame: The Eagles, Fleetwood Mac, The Mamas & the Papas, Lloyd Price, Santana and Gene Vincent
- Inductees of the GMA Gospel Music Hall of Fame include Andrae Crouch, The Imperials, The Jordanaires and The LeFevres

=== Mercury Music Prize ===
- Bring It On – Gomez wins.

== Charts ==
- List of Billboard Hot 100 number ones of 1998
- 1998 in British music#Charts
- List of Oricon number-one singles of 1998

== See also ==
- 1998 in music (UK)
- Musical groups established in 1998
- Record labels established in 1998
