= Guilty until proven innocent (disambiguation) =

Guilty until proven innocent refers to the presumption of guilt.

Guilty until proven innocent may also refer to:

- "Guilty Until Proven Innocent", a 2000 single by Jay-Z
- Guilty 'til Proven Innocent, a 1998 album by Prime Suspects

== See also ==
- Guilty 'til Proved Innocent!, a 1998 album by Specials
