= Are You Jimmy Ray? =

1997 single by Jimmy Ray

Single by Jimmy Ray

from the album Jimmy Ray
- Released: 13 October 1997
- Studio: Bunk Junk & Genius
- Genre: Rockabilly; pop; hip hop; alternative rock
- Length: 3:29 (single)
- Label: Epic; Sony Soho Square
- Songwriters: Con Fitzpatrick; Jimmy Ray
- Producer: Con Fitzpatrick

Jimmy Ray singles chronology
"Are You Jimmy Ray?" (1997)	"Goin' to Vegas" (1998)

Music video
- "Are You Jimmy Ray?" on YouTube

"Are You Jimmy Ray?" is a song by English singer-songwriter Jimmy Ray, released in October 1997, by Epic and Sony Soho Square, as the first single from his self-titled debut album (1997). The song is written by Ray with its producer, Con Fitzpatrick, and peaked at number 13 on both the US Billboard Hot 100 and the UK Singles Chart. It was most successful in Canada, reaching number two on the RPM 100 Hit Tracks chart. The accompanying music video was directed by Vaughan Arnell and filmed in Los Angeles. Ray later re-recorded the song as "Who Wants to Know" on his second album, Live to Fight Another Day, in 2017.

== Critical reception ==
AllMusic editor Stephen Thomas Erlewine complimented the song as "infectious". Larry Flick from Billboard magazine named it a "quirky pop ditty". He noted that "the question now is, Will it grow into a full-fledged pop fire, à la Chumbawamba's similarly chantable breakout smash 'Tubthumping'? Chances are certainly in its favor. The track has a fun, galloping beat, as well as scratchy guitars that are mildly reminiscent of '80s-era new wave. Who cares that the song does not appear to be about anything in particular? The words are cute if completely innocuous, and the chorus is as sticky as cotton candy." Tom Lanham from Entertainment Weekly wrote that Ray "gleefully pairs techno rhythms with a Sun-session slap back and chirpy female chorus."

Jerry Crowe of Los Angeles Times described it as "catchy", noting the song's "infectious" chorus; Are you Johnnie Ray? Are you Stingray? Are you Fay Wray? Are you Jimmy Ray? Pan-European magazine Music & Media constated that "he certainly is Jimmy Ray, and this sparkling, rocky, track is guaranteed to ensure that radio programmers across Europe won't forget this lanky London lad's name in a hurry. Ray's a new face, but there's a degree of familiarity about the music here; it owes much of its clout to a reworked Bo Diddley guitar riff." Music Week gave it a full score of five out of five, stating that "pouting Jimmy looks the part of a popstar, and this self-penned song with well-thought out remixes should catapult him to stardom." A reviewer from People Magazine felt the singer "exudes the sort of animal magnetism that has been a pop rarity lately."

== Music video ==
A music video for "Are You Jimmy Ray?" went into heavy rotation on music television. The video juxtaposed Ray's rockabilly image with a trailer park setting as women in sports jerseys and football shorts danced behind him. It was directed by British director Vaughan Arnell. The video was filmed in Los Angeles and in some of the scenes, Ray can be seen walking in front of the downtown LA skyline.

== Track listing ==
1. "Are You Jimmy Ray?" (radio edit) – 3:29 (Sax: Gary Barnacle)
2. "Are You Jimmy Ray?" (Jimcon Extended Mix) – 6:10
3. "Are You Jimmy Ray?" (Xenomania Club Mix) – 6:45

== Charts ==
=== Weekly charts ===
Chart (1997–1998)	Peak position
Australia (ARIA)	84
Canada Top Singles (RPM)	2
Canada Adult Contemporary (RPM)	18
Europe (Eurochart Hot 100)	79
Germany (GfK)	74
Hungary (Mahasz)	5
Italy Airplay (Music & Media)	4
New Zealand (Recorded Music NZ)	31
Scottish Singles Sales (Official Charts)	19
Spain (AFYVE)	4
Sweden (Sverigetopplistan)	53
UK Singles (Official Charts)	13
US Billboard Hot 100	13
US Adult Pop Airplay (Billboard)	25
US Dance Singles Sales (Billboard)	42
US Pop Airplay (Billboard)	10

=== Year-end charts ===
Chart (1998)	Position
Canada Top Singles (RPM)	25
US Billboard Hot 100	65
US Adult Top 40 (Billboard)	82
US Mainstream Top 40 (Billboard)	58

== Certifications ==
Region	Certification	Certified units/sales
United States (RIAA)	Gold	500,000
