= Robert G. O'Meally =

Academic background
- Education: Stanford University (BA); Harvard University (PhD)

Academic work
- Discipline: Jazz, African American literature
- Institutions: Howard University; Wesleyan University; Columbia University

Robert George O'Meally is an American scholar of African American culture and jazz. He is the Zora Neale Hurston Professor of English and Comparative Literature at Columbia University.

== Biography ==
O'Meally grew up in Washington, D.C., to George O’Meally and Ethel Browne O'Meally, who was a noted educator in the district's public school system. He received his B.A. from Stanford University and Ph.D. from Harvard University. He taught at Howard University from 1975 to 1978, Wesleyan University from 1978 to 1989, and joined the faculty of Barnard College in 1989 as the Adolph S. and Effie Ochs Professorship of Literature. He has been teaching at Columbia University since 1993, when he was appointed to the Hurston Professorship. He founded Columbia's Center for Jazz Studies in 1999 and led the center until 2007.

O'Meally has written extensively about jazz artists, including Billie Holiday and African-American culture, notably on the life and works of Ralph Ellison and Sterling Allen Brown.

O'Meally received a Guggenheim Fellowship in 1989. He was also nominated for a Grammy Award for Best Historical Album in 1999 for producing the album The Jazz Singers.

He is married to Jacqui Malone, professor of dance at Queens College, City University of New York.
