= Jimmy Ray =

English singer-songwriter

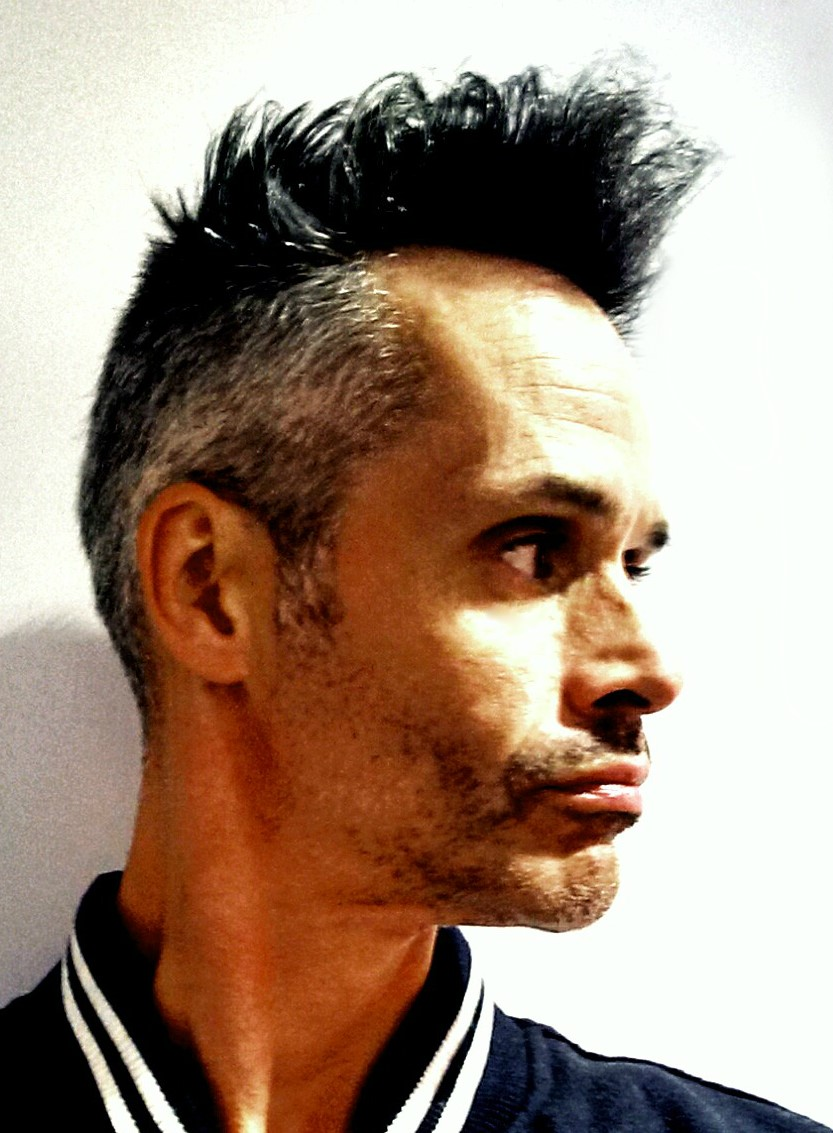
- Ray in 2018

Background information
- Born: James Ray; London, England
- Genres: Rockabilly; pop rock; hip hop
- Instruments: Vocals, guitar
- Years active: 1994–present
- Labels: La Rocka; S2; Epic

James "Jimmy" Ray is an English singer, songwriter and musician.

== Career ==
In press interviews and promotional materials, Ray cited his influence by the music of Elvis Presley and other rock and roll stars such as Buddy Holly, Eddie Cochran and Tommy Steele. His manager was Simon Fuller, who also managed the Spice Girls and produced the hit show American Idol. Ray's recording career began as one-half of techno-pop outfit AV (Alternative Vision). The duo was founded in 1994 by Graham Drinnan (a.k.a. 'Gypsy' or 'Gipsy') who previously as a solo artist had scored several critically acclaimed techno/house hits in the early 1990s, most notably "I Trance You", "Funk De Fino" and "Skinnybumblebee". AV signed to Sony S2 Records in 1994 but no recordings were ever released.

After splitting from Drinnan in 1996, Ray went on to score a hit single in both the United Kingdom and the United States with his debut single "Are You Jimmy Ray?" the following year. "Are You Jimmy Ray?" reached No. 13 on the U.S. Billboard Hot 100 chart and sold over 500,000 copies in the U.S. alone.

Ray released his self-titled album in the U.S. in March 1998, but the album was never issued in the UK. The song "Are You Jimmy Ray?" was successful in his native country reaching No. 13 on the UK Singles Chart in November 1997.

Ray followed up in 1998 (primarily in the UK) with "Goin' to Vegas", including a televised performance on Live and Kicking Friday. It failed to enter the UK top 40, only peaking at No. 47. A video for the single was made, but it (and the single) never aired in the U.S. In mid-1998, Ray went on the U.S. tour with the Backstreet Boys. In late 1998, a third promotional single and video clip, "I Got Rolled" was given minimal airplay.

In a November 2015 announcement on his official fan page, Ray stated that he was working on material for a comeback record. This was later confirmed in September 2016 on his record label's website: "La Rocka Records was created in 2016 as a launchpad for UK singer Jimmy Ray's 'comeback' album tentatively titled Live to Fight Another Day". A later promotional video posted on the La Rocka Records website and YouTube channel confirmed the release date as 13 October 2017.

== Discography ==
=== Albums ===
List of albums, with selected chart positions
Title	Year	Peak chart positions
Title	Year	US
Jimmy Ray	1998	112
Live to Fight Another Day	2017	—

=== Singles ===
List of singles, with selected chart positions and certifications
Title	Year	Peak chart positions			Certifications	Album
Title	Year	UK	AUS	US	Certifications	Album
"Are You Jimmy Ray?"	1997	13	84	13	RIAA: Gold	Jimmy Ray
"Goin' to Vegas"	1998	49	—	—		Jimmy Ray
"I Got Rolled"	1998	—	—	—		Jimmy Ray
"Who Wants to Know?"	2018	—	—	—		Live to Fight Another Day
"Dangerous Feeling"	2018	—	—	—		Live to Fight Another Day
"Per Aspera Ad Astra"	2020	—	—	—		Non-album single
