= The Jazz Singers =

Box set by various artists
- Released: May 19, 1998
- Recorded: 1919–1994
- Genre: Jazz
- Length: 352:02
- Label: Smithsonian Collection
- Producers: Bruce Talbot, Robert G. O'Meally

Professional ratings
Review scores
Source	Rating
Allmusic	link
Ink 19	(Positive) link

The Jazz Singers: A Smithsonian Collection of Jazz Vocals from 1919-1994 is a box set containing five CDs released by the Smithsonian Institution in 1998. It is organized thematically, rather than chronologically. Half of the categories overlap from one disc to another.

== Track listing ==
(Disc 1)

=== Steeped In The Blues ===
- 1-01 Eva Taylor - "West End Blues" (3:09)
- 1-02 Bessie Smith - "In the House Blues" (2:59)
- 1-03 Louis Armstrong - "2:19 Blues" (2:52)
- 1-04 Jimmy Rushing - "I Left My Baby" (3:10)
- 1-05 Billie Holiday - "'Tain't Nobody's Business If I Do" (3:19)
- 1-06 Helen Humes - "Blues With Helen" (4:08)
- 1-07 Hot Lips Page - "I Won't Be Here Long" (2:40)
- 1-08 Billy Eckstine - "Jelly, Jelly" (3:28)
- 1-09 Julia Lee - "Lotus Blossom" (3:17)
- 1-10 Jimmy Witherspoon - "Goin' To Kansas City" (3:11)
- 1-11 Joe Williams / Lambert, Hendricks & Ross - "Goin' To Chicago" (4:09)
- 1-12 Ernie Andrews - "She's Got To Go" (4:01)
- 1-13 Ernestine Anderson - "Never Make Your Move Too Soon" (3:27)
- 1-14 Lorez Alexandria - "D.B. Blues" (2:56)
- 1-15 Cassandra Wilson - "Come On in My Kitchen" (4:53)

=== Straight Out Of Church ===
- 1-16 Blind Willie Johnson - "Nobody's Fault but Mine" (3:09)
- 1-17 Angelic Gospel Singers / Dixie Hummingbirds, The - "One Day" (2:14)
- 1-18 Mahalia Jackson - "I'm Going To Live The Life I Sing About In My Song" (2:36)

=== Rhythm Singers: Let's Have A Party ===
- 1-19 Bessie Smith - "Gimme a Pigfoot (And a Bottle of Beer)" (3:28)
- 1-20 Jelly Roll Morton - "Doctor Jazz" (3:20)
- 1-21 Don Redman - "Shakin' The African" (2:38)
- 1-22 Ivie Anderson - "It Don't Mean a Thing (If It Ain't Got That Swing)" (3:09)

(Disc 2)

- 2-01 Cab Calloway - "The Man From Harlem" (3:06)
- 2-02 Anita O'Day - "Let Me Off Uptown" (3:02)
- 2-03 Pearl Bailey and Moms Mabley - "Saturday Night Fish Fry" (2:52)
- 2-04 Louis Jordan - "Hogwash" (2:57)
- 2-05 Wynonie Harris - "Good Rockin' Tonight" (2:46)

=== Swinging The Songbook ===
- 2-06 Louis Armstrong - "All Of Me" (2:55)
- 2-07 Louis Armstrong - "Top Hat, White Tie and Tails" (4:08)
- 2-08 Ethel Waters - "I Can't Give You Anything But Love" (3:07)
- 2-09 Billie Holiday - "I Can't Give You Anything But Love" (3:26)
- 2-10 Billie Holiday - "These Foolish Things" (3:16)
- 2-11 Billie Holiday - "Me, Myself, and I" (2:35)
- 2-12 Mildred Bailey - "Lover, Come Back to Me" (3:09)
- 2-13 Al Hibbler - "Don't Get Around Much Anymore" (3:01)
- 2-14 Joe Turner - "You're Driving Me Crazy" (4:12)
- 2-15 Ella Fitzgerald and Louis Armstrong - "Don't Be That Way" (4:59)
- 2-16 Frank Sinatra - "Night and Day" (3:57)
- 2-17 Jimmy Rushing - "Some of These Days" (4:47)
- 2-18 Sarah Vaughan - "Wrap Your Troubles In Dreams" (2:30)
- 2-19 Dinah Washington - "I Get A Kick Out Of You" (6:17)
- 2-20 Joe Williams - "There's a Small Hotel" (2:15)
- 2-21 Nat King Cole - "Just You, Just Me" (3:00)

(Disc 3)

- 3-01 Dakota Staton - "Give Me the Simple Life" (2:13)
- 3-02 Nina Simone - "Love Me Or Leave Me" (4:04)
- 3-03 Aretha Franklin - "You Are My Sunshine" (4:18)
- 3-04 Marvin Gaye - "What's Going On" (3:47)
- 3-05 Etta Jones - "I'm Gonna Lock My Heart (And Throw Away The Key)" (3:10)

=== After Hours: Slow-Dancing And Torching The Songbook ===
- 3-06 Billie Holiday - "Yesterdays" (3:23)
- 3-07 Billie Holiday - "Strange Fruit" (3:06)
- 3-08 Billie Holiday - "You've Changed" (3:16)
- 3-09 Ella Fitzgerald - "Someone To Watch Over Me" (3:14)
- 3-10 Ella Fitzgerald - "Until The Real Thing Comes Along" (2:55)
- 3-11 Fats Waller & His Rhythm - "Until the Real Thing Comes Along" (3:23)
- 3-12 Dinah Washington - "You Don't Know What Love Is" (4:00)
- 3-13 June Christy - "For All We Know" (2:46)
- 3-14 Chris Connor - "Angel Eyes" (3:41)
- 3-15 Billy Eckstine - "In the Still of the Night" (3:40)
- 3-16 Nancy Wilson - "Save Your Love For Me" (2:42)
- 3-17 Shirley Horn - "Travelin' Light" (2:46)
- 3-18 Sarah Vaughan - "Prelude to a Kiss" (2:45)
- 3-19 Gloria Lynne - "My Little Brown Book" (2:30)
- 3-20 Johnny Hartman - "Lush Life" (5:27)
- 3-21 Carmen McRae - "I Got It Bad (And That Ain't Good)" (3:26)

(Disc 4)

- 4-01 Betty Carter - "This Is Always" (3:10)
- 4-02 Little Jimmy Scott - "All Of Me" (2:57)
- 4-03 Earl Coleman - "What Are You Doing the Rest of Your Life?" (5:47)
- 4-04 Helen Merrill - "You're My Thrill" (3:16)
- 4-05 Al Green - "Could I Be The One?" (4:05)

=== Jazz Compositions ===
- 4-06 Lucille Hegamin - "Jazz Me Blues" (2:33)
- 4-07 Baby Cox - "The Mooche" (3:11)
- 4-08 King Pleasure - "Parker's Mood" (2:58)
- 4-09 Sarah Vaughan - "Lullaby Of Birdland" (3:59)
- 4-10 Mel Tormé - "Down For Double" (2:31)
- 4-11 Lambert, Hendricks & Ross – "Jumpin' at the Woodside" (3:17)
- 4-12 Abbey Lincoln - "Left Alone" (6:45)
- 4-13 Mark Murphy - "Stolen Moments" (5:43)
- 4-14 Jeanne Lee - "Worry Now Later" (1:25)
- 4-15 Carmen McRae - "Get It Straight" (3:54)
- 4-16 Bobby McFerrin - "'Round Midnight" (5:33)
- 4-17 Dee Dee Bridgewater - "Doodlin'" (6:04)

=== Scat And Vocalese ===
- 4-18 Jelly Roll Morton - "Improvised Scat Song" (1:45)
- 4-19 Louis Armstrong & His Hot Five - "Hotter Than That" (2:59)

(Disc 5)

- 5-01 Louis Armstrong and His Orchestra - "Sweet Sue (Just You)" (2:44)
- 5-02 Bing Crosby / The Mills Brothers - "My Honey's Lovin' Arms" (2:56)
- 5-03 Dizzy Gillespie - "Ool Ya Koo" (6:00)
- 5-04 Eddie Jefferson - "Disappointed (Excerpt)" (2:48)
- 5-05 Ella Fitzgerald - "Them There Eyes" (5:05)
- 5-06 Anita O'Day - "The Way You Look Tonight" (2:10)
- 5-07 George Benson - "The Masquerade (Excerpt)" (3:17)
- 5-08 Betty Carter - "Frenesi" (2:30)

=== Novelties And Take-Offs ===
- 5-09 Noble Sissle - "Jazzola" (2:51)
- 5-10 Louis Armstrong - "Hobo, You Can't Ride This Train" (3:03)
- 5-11 Louis Armstrong - "Rockin' Chair" (5:15)
- 5-12 Trummy Young - "'Tain't What You Do" (3:02)
- 5-13 George "Bon Bon" Tunnell - "Vol Vist Du Gaily Star" (3:03)
- 5-14 Leo Watson and The Spirits Of Rhythm - "We've Got The Blues" (3:18)
- 5-15 Ella Fitzgerald - "Cow-Cow Boogie" (2:52)
- 5-16 Slim Gaillard and His Orchestra - "Babalu (Orooney)" (3:30)
- 5-17 Nellie Lutcher and Her Rhythm - "Chi-Chi-Chi-Chicago" (2:58)
- 5-18 Ben Webster - "Did You Call Her Today? (Excerpt)" (6:25)
- 5-19 Lester Young - "Takes Two to Tango" (3:26)
- 5-20 Clark Terry - "Mumbles" (2:00)
- 5-21 Slam Stewart and Major Holley - "Close Your Eyes (Shut Yo' Mouth)" (3:31)

== See also ==
- Vocal jazz
