= Consuelo Villalon Aleman =

Mexican pianist

Consuelo Villalón Alemán
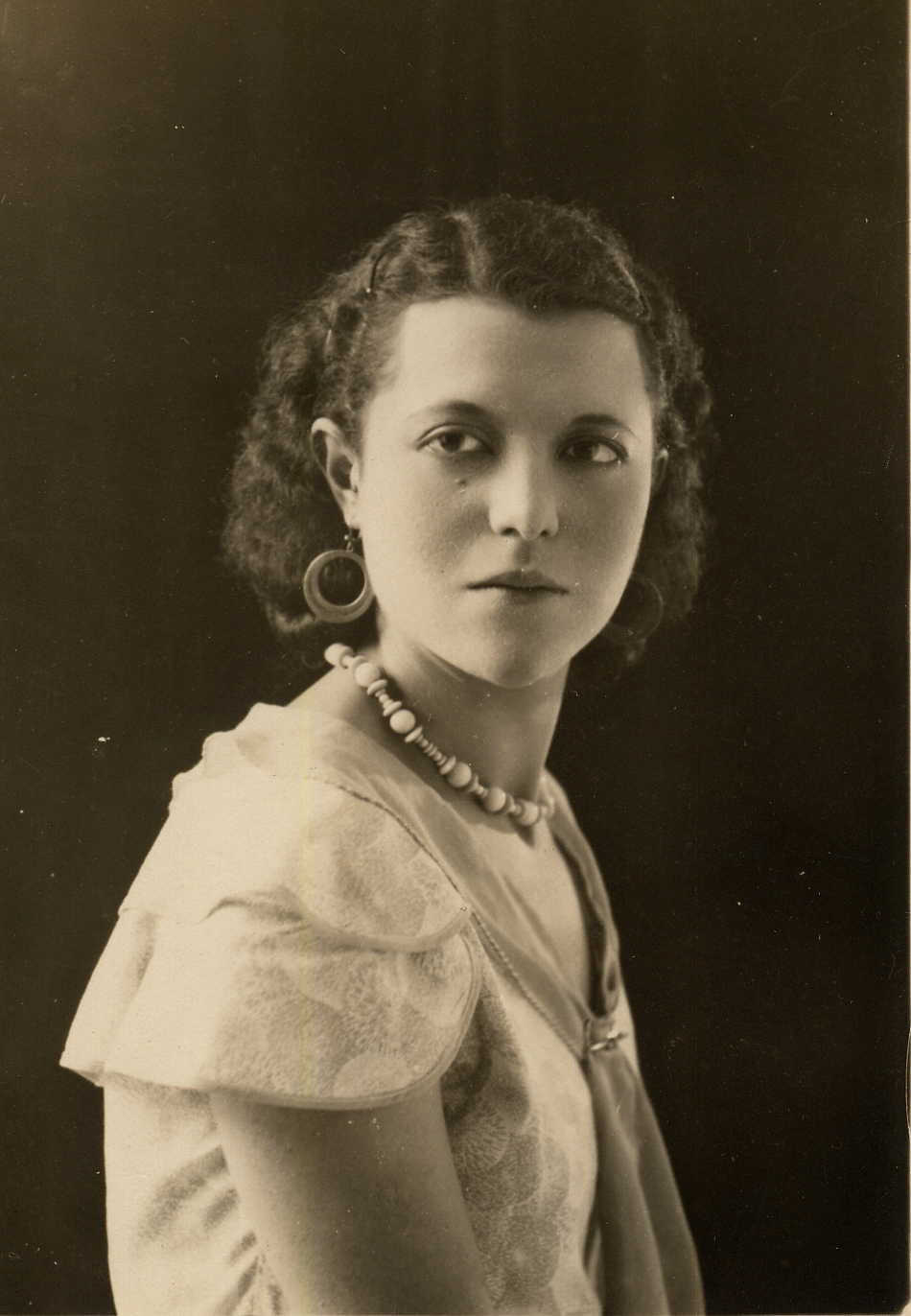
- Villalón Alemán at age 15
- Born: 24 May 1907; Monterrey, Nuevo León, Mexico
- Died: 8 November 1998 (aged 91); Mexico City, Mexico
- Occupations: Pianist, music educator

Consuelo Villalón Alemán (24 May 1907 – 8 November 1998) was a Mexican pianist and music educator during the twentieth century. She is remembered for her professional interpretation of Frédéric Chopin's music.

== Early life ==
Born in Monterrey, Nuevo León, Villalón moved at the age of 8 with her family to Mexico City (Distrito Federal). There she started professional piano lessons with composer Manuel M. Ponce. At age 9 she began teaching piano. She studied with Luis Moctezuma at the Escuela Nacional de Música at UNAM.

== Career ==
As a performer, Villalón was best known for her performances of music by Chopin and Ponce, and she was compared to Arthur Rubinstein. She became head of the piano department at UNAM in 1952, upon Moctezuma's recommendation, and taught according to his methods. Francisco José Beyer Bustos was one of her students at UNAM.

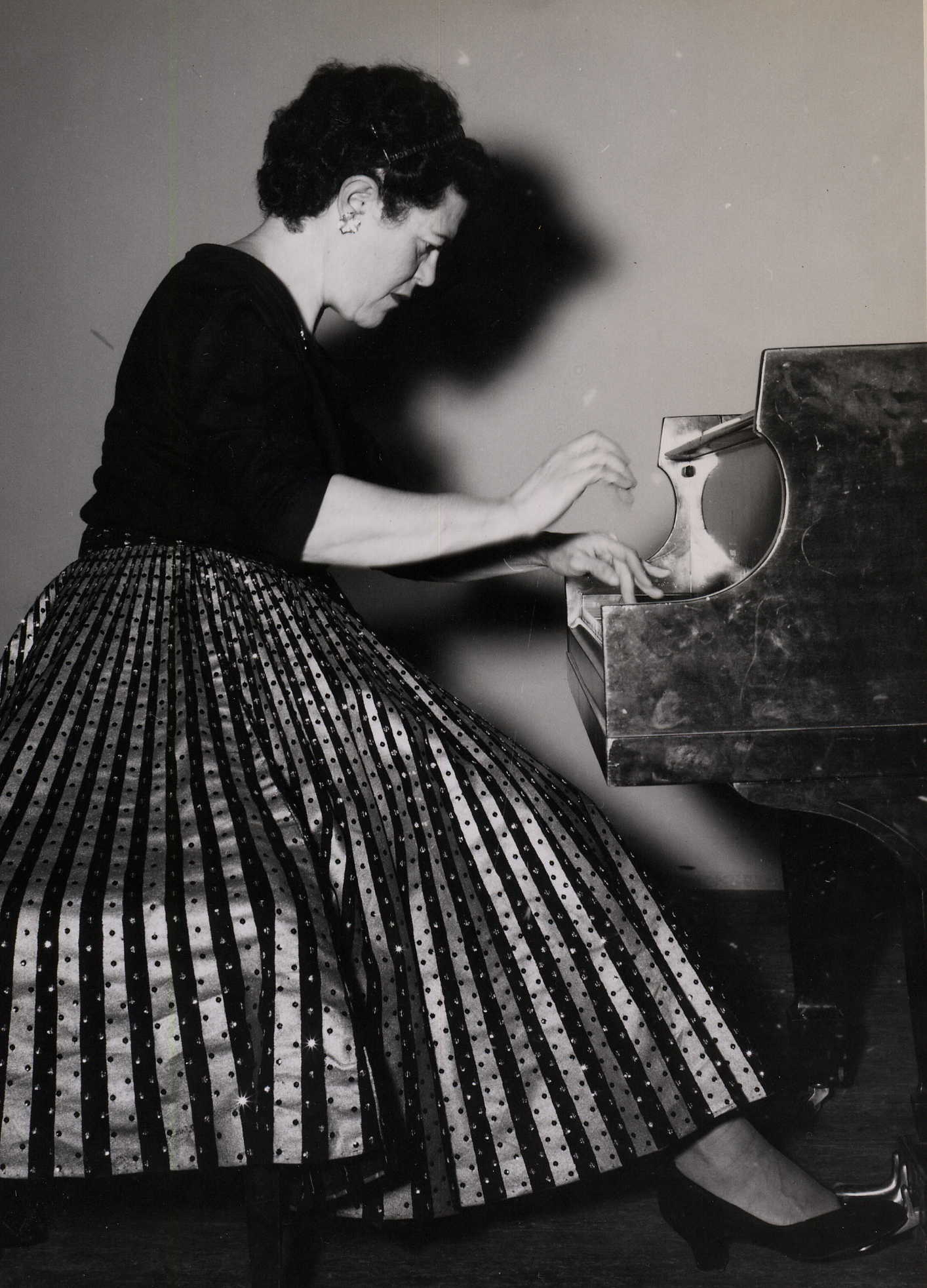
Consuelo Villalón Alemán at a concert, 1972.

== Later years ==
Villalón taught privately until the age of 89. She died at the age of 91, in Mexico City.
