= BBC Sessions (The Specials album) =

BBC Sessions (The Specials)

Compilation album by The Specials
- Released: 26 October 1998
- Recorded: May 23, 1979 – September 12, 1983
- Genre: Ska, 2 tone, new wave
- Label: EMI
- Producer: John Sparrow (1 to 4), Tony Wilson (5 to 7, 11 to 13), Bob Sargeant (8 to 10)

The Specials chronology
Guilty 'Til Proved Innocent! (1998)	BBC Sessions (The Specials) (1998)	Blue Plate Specials Live (1999)

Professional ratings
Review scores
Source	Rating
Allmusic	2.5/5 stars

BBC Sessions is a compilation album with all The Specials' live BBC performances.

== Track listing ==
No.	Title	Writer(s)	Length
1.	"Gangsters" (In Session with John Peel 29/5/79)	Jerry Dammers, Cecil Campbell	3:03
2.	"Too Much Too Young" (In Session with John Peel 29/5/79)	Jerry Dammers, acknowledgment to Lloyd Charmers	2:07
3.	"Concrete Jungle" (In Session with John Peel 29/5/79)	Roddy Byers	3:20
4.	"Monkey Man" (In Session with John Peel 29/5/79)	Toots Hibbert	2:41
5.	"Rude Boys Outta Jail" (In Session with John Peel 22/10/79)	Lynval Golding, Neville Staple	2:56
6.	"Rat Race" (In Session with John Peel 22/10/79)	Roddy Byers	3:10
7.	"The Skinhead Symphony In Three Movements: Long Shot Kick the Bucket / The Liquidator / Skinhead Moonstomp" (In Session with John Peel 22/10/79)	George Agard, Sydney Crooks, Jackie Robinson, Harry Johnson, Roy Ellis, Monty Naysmith	5:48
8.	"Sea Cruise" (In Session with John Peel 01/12/80)		3:12
9.	"Stereotype" (In Session with John Peel 01/12/80)	Jerry Dammers	6:16
10.	"Racquel" (In Session with John Peel 01/12/80)	Jerry Dammers	1:40
11.	"Alcohol" (In Session with John Peel 12/09/83)	Jerry Dammers	3:46
12.	"Lonely Crowd" (In Session with John Peel 12/09/83)	Stan Campbell, Jerry Dammers, John Shipley	3:22
13.	"Bright Lights" (In Session with John Peel 12/09/83)	John Bradbury, Stan Campbell, Dick Cuthell, Jerry Dammers	4:11
14.	"Blank Expression" (Unknown Programme and Date)	Jerry Dammers, The Specials	1:53
15.	"You're Wondering Now" (Unknown Programme and Date)	Clement Seymour	2:23
16.	"Friday Night, Saturday Morning" (Unknown Programme and Date)	Terry Hall	3:14
