= Ce que je sais =

Studio album by Johnny Hallyday
- Released: 23 January 1998
- Recorded: France, 1998
- Genre: Pop, rock
- Label: Mercury, Polygram
- Producer: Pascal Obispo

Johnny Hallyday chronology
Lorada Tour (1995)	Ce que je sais (1998)	Stade de France 1998 – Allume le feu (1998)

Singles from Ce que je sais
- 1. "Ce que je sais" Released: January 1998; 2. "Debout" Released: March 1998; 3. "Allumer le feu" Released: June 1998; 4. "Seul" Released: September 1998

Professional ratings
Review scores
Source	Rating
Allmusic	3/5 stars

Ce que je sais is a 1998 album recorded by French singer Johnny Hallyday. It was released on 23 January 1998, and achieved success in France and Belgium (Wallonia), where, however, it failed to top the charts, being blocked by the soundtrack album of the Titanic. It provided four singles in France, but a sole top ten hit : "Ce que je sais" (#9), "Debout" (#58), "Allumer le feu" (#39) and "Seul" (#32). The album was entirely composed by French artist Pascal Obispo, helped on certain songs by Zazie and Lionel Florence.

== Track listing ==
1. "Ce que je sais" (Golemanas, Pascal Obispo) – 4:14
2. "Chacun cherche son cœur" (Golemanas, Obispo) – 4:18
3. "Plus près de vous" (Golemanas, Obispo) – 4:50
4. "Allumer le feu" (Golemanas, Jaconelli, Obispo) – 5:29
5. "Debout" (Florence, Golemanas, Obispo) – 4:06
6. "C'est en France" (Golemanas, Jaconelli, Obispo) – 4:44
7. "Les moulins à vent" (Florence, Golemanas, Obispo) – 4:51
8. "Seul" (Florence, Obispo) – 4:54
9. "Nos Limites" (Golemanas, Obispo) – 3:18
10. "C'est la vie qui veut ça" (Golemanas, Obispo, Zazie) – 4:58
11. "L'Eldorado" (Golemanas, Obispo) – 4:08
12. "Que ma Harley repose en paix" (Golemanas, Jaconelli, Obispo) – 3:58
13. "Le temps passer" (Golemanas, Jaconelli, Obispo) – 4:55
14. "Regarde-moi t'aimer" (Golemanas, Obispo) – 4:39

Source : Allmusic.

== Releases ==
Date	Label	Country	Format	Catalog
1998	Polydor	Belgium, France, Switzerland	CD	536920
1998	Polygram	Belgium, France, Switzerland	CD	5369202
2006	Universal Music	Belgium, France, Switzerland	CD	9841046
2006	Universal Music	Belgium, France, Switzerland	CD	9840990

== Certifications and sales ==
Country	Certification	Date	Sales certified	Physical sales
France	2 x Platinum	December 23, 1998	600,000	590,000
Switzerland	Gold	1998	25,000	

== Charts ==
=== Weekly charts ===
Chart (1998–2000)	Peak position
Belgian (Wallonia) Albums Chart	2
French SNEP Albums Chart	2
Swiss Albums Chart	38

=== Year-end charts ===
Chart (1998)	Position
Belgian (Wallonia) Albums Chart	23
French Albums Chart	14
