= Nada Tončić =

Croatian soprano opera singer

Nada Tončić (July 30, 1909 – March 29, 1998) was a Croatian operatic soprano. She was a prima donna at the Croatian National Theatre in Zagreb from 1933 to 1963.

== Biography ==
Nada Tončić was born in Syrmian city of Zemun (then in Kingdom of Croatia-Slavonia, Kingdom of Hungary, Austria-Hungary, now in Belgrade Region, Serbia) on July 30, 1909. She studied singing with soprano Nada Eder-Bertić at the Zagreb Academy of Music. Her career began in 1933 in the opera company of the Croatian National Theatre (CNT) where she made her debut as Oscar in Giuseppe Verdi's Un ballo in maschera.

Tončić was a principal soprano at the CNT for thirty years. Her repertoire of approximately 100 roles encompassed both lyric soprano and coloratura soprano parts. Opera characters she portrayed during her career included Anne Trulove in The Rake's Progress, Cio-Cio-San in Madame Butterfly, Concepción in L'heure espagnole, Đula in Ero s onoga svijeta, Euridice in Orfeo ed Euridice, Gilda in Rigoletto, Jelene in Zajc's Nikola Šubić Zrinski, Marženka in The Bartered Bride, Mimì in La bohème, Tatyana in Eugene Onegin, Violetta in La traviata, Zorka in Porin, and the title roles in Adriana Lecouvreur, Lakmé, Manon, and Salome. She retired from the CNT in 1963.

Outside of Croatia she worked as a guest artist at various European opera houses; including all of the major theaters in Yugoslavia. She also gave many performances at the Municipal Theatre of Santiago in Chile where she made her debut as Anne Trulove, and later returned in roles like Cio-Cio-San and Salome.

She died in Varaždin, Croatia, on March 29, 1998, at the age of 88.
