= Jimmy Ray (album) =

Studio album by Jimmy Ray
- Released: 10 March 1998
- Recorded: 1997
- Studios: Bunk Junk & Genius, Eden Studios, Metropolis Studios, Strongroom, The Church, Trident Studios (London, England)
- Genres: Rockabilly; pop; hip hop; alternative rock
- Length: 35:15
- Label: Epic
- Producers: Jimmy Ray; Con Fitzpatrick

Jimmy Ray chronology
Jimmy Ray (1998)	Live to Fight Another Day (2017)

Jimmy Ray is the debut album by British singer Jimmy Ray, released on 10 March 1998. He wrote or co-wrote every song on the album. It debuted at No. 112 on the Billboard 200, and also reached No. 2 on the Heatseekers Chart. Its only successful single, "Are You Jimmy Ray?", made the album a substantial success. "Goin' to Vegas" and "I Got Rolled" did not chart in the US, but had some minor success in Ray's native UK.

== Musical style ==
The sound of Jimmy Ray is a fusion of rockabilly, pop, hip hop and alternative rock.

== Critical reception ==
Professional ratings
Review scores
Source	Rating
AllMusic	3/5 stars
Robert Christgau	(dud)
Rolling Stone	2.5/5 stars

The Edmonton Journal wrote that Ray "cops Danny Zuko's greased stud looks, Michael Hutchence's white-funk hooks, Brian Setzer's '50s rocker riffs and the programming talents of Britain's best DJs."

== Track listing ==
All tracks are written by Jimmy Ray and Con Fitzpatrick, except where noted.

No.	Title	Writer(s)	Producer(s)	Length
1.	"Are You Jimmy Ray?"		Fitzpatrick	3:29
2.	"Goin' to Vegas"		Fitzpatrick, Ray	3:30
3.	"I Got Rolled"		Fitzpatrick, Ray	3:38
4.	"Daddy's Got a Gun"		Fitzpatrick	3:33
5.	"Way Low"		Fitzpatrick	3:33
6.	"Look Inside for Love"	Ray	Fitzpatrick	3:35
7.	"Trippin' on Baby Blue"		Fitzpatrick	3:54
8.	"Sex for Beginners"		Fitzpatrick	3:12
9.	"Let It Go Go"	Ray	Fitzpatrick, Ray	3:36
10.	"Free at Last"	Ray	Fitzpatrick	3:15

== Personnel ==
Credits adapted from the album's inlay and liner notes.

Vocals

- Jimmy Ray – lead vocals (all tracks), backing vocals (1–3, 5–7), drum vocals (4)
- Katy Kisoon – backing vocals (2–8)
- Con Fitzpatrick – backing vocals (1, 2, 4)
- Chyna Gordon – backing vocals (1)
- Lance Ellington – backing vocals (2)
- The Real People – backing vocals (9)
- Jason Christian – backing vocals (9)

Instrumentation

- Jimmy Ray – acoustic guitar (1, 4), programming (2–4, 6, 8–10)
- Con Fitzpatrick – acoustic guitar (4, 8, 10), slide guitar (4), programming (2–8, 10)
- Rich King – lead guitar, programming (10)
- Rob Tidd – rhythm guitar (10)
- Nick Nasmyth – keyboards (6, 8), Hammond organ (10)
- Nick Plytas – Hammond organ (7)
- John Thirkell – horns (2), trumpet (8)
- Gary Barnacle – saxophone (1, 6)
- Phil Smith – saxophone (8)
- Fayyaz Virji – trombone (8)
- Brendan Power – harmonica (4)
- Mark Seltham – harmonica (7)
- The Real People – percussion (9)

Technical

- Finn Steele – engineering, mixing (all tracks)
- Connagh MacLean – assistant engineering (1, 3, 6)
- Richard Hinton – assistant engineering (4, 8, 10)
- Pat McGovern – assistant engineering (2, 5)
- Ron Warshow – assistant engineering (9, 10)
- Matt & Matt – assistant engineering (7)
- Con Fitzpatrick – mixing
- Jimmy Ray – mixing

Imagery

- Rick Guest – photography

== Charts ==
Chart performance for Jimmy Ray
Chart (1998)	Peak position
US Billboard 200	112

== Certifications ==
Certifications for Jimmy Ray
Region	Certification	Certified units/sales
Canada (Music Canada)	Gold	50,000^{^}
^{^} Shipments figures based on certification alone.
