= Future Unseen, Soundtrack for the Film =

1998 album by Frankie Death and The Photon Belt

Studio album by Frankie Death and The Photon Belt
- Released: 3 March 1998
- Recorded: January – December 1997
- Genre: Psychedelic
- Length: 50 mins
- Label: Subversive Records (Australia)

Frankie Death and The Photon Belt chronology
| The Photon Belt (ep) (1997) | Future Unseen, Soundtrack for the Film (1998) |

Future Unseen is the first studio album for visual artist/musician Frankie Death and the music group The Photon Belt, originally released on 7 Seater Records (Vocabularinist) in Sydney and Subversive Records in Melbourne, Australia in March, 1998.

Frankie Death and The Photon Belt are separate entities who collaborated on the album. It includes contributions by musicians such as Gideon Cozens (Compost, Goat, Buttered Loaf), Richie Poate (Dreadnaught) and Brad Herdson (Gerling, Sonic Emotion Explosion, Little Sky).

Geoff Towner, in Revolver Street Press, described it as 'acoustic space-folk, hip hop beats and electronic minimalism,' saying that 'the production has a 70's T-Rex feel.'

A video clip was made by Simon Castelow (Sidesign) for the track 'Lovekult' and broadcast on ABCs' music video program Rage on 8 May 1998.

== Track listing ==
1. "Rending The Veil" (intro) - 1:40
2. "Future Unseen" - 3:38
3. "Dream Sequence I (In Search of a New Reality)" - 1:45
4. "Caught Between" - 4:16
5. "Dream Sequence II (Imbroglio Sabbatical)" - 5:53
6. "Lovekult" - 2:35
7. "I Am (Hum Chant)" - 1:36
8. "Garden Seed (D.N.A. Song)" - 3:14
9. "Can You Get My Plane?" - 5:56
10. "Face The Music (Sometime)" - 5:12
11. "Recurring Theme" - 1:15
12. "Guided (Conclusion)" - 3:57
13. "Secret Track" - 3:00

== Song information ==
A sample from a recording of Symphonie Fantastique by Hector Berlioz can be heard at the beginning of "Garden Seed". Also random samples from the 1965 film Simon of the Desert directed by Luis Buñuel, can be heard in "Dream Sequence I" and "Dream Sequence II".

== Personnel ==
- Frankie Death - Vocals, guitar, percussion, keyboards, drums
- Evil Ernie - Synthesizers, bass, vocals, percussion
- Gideon Cozens - Bass
- Richie Poate - Electric guitar
- Brad Herdson - Electric guitar
- Jeremy Dullard - Vibraphone
- Mathew Harrod - Drums
- Sam Morgan - Percussion
- Adam Simmons - Saxophone
- Blake Tholen-Gray - Vocals

== Technical personnel ==
- Ernie Oppenheimer - Executive Producer
- Richie Poate - Assistant Engineer
- James Vincent - Mastering
- Ernie Oppenheimer - Mixing
- Mathew Harrod - Graphic Design
- Frankie Death - Lyricist, Producer, Artwork

== Reception ==
Reviewers praised the album's originality and 'huge noise soundscapes,' comparing it favorably to Pink Floyd, the Beastie Boys, and Adam Ant. The single "Lovekult" was described as being 'enjoyable as a tongue-in-cheek novelty song.'
