= Close II You =

Dutch girl group

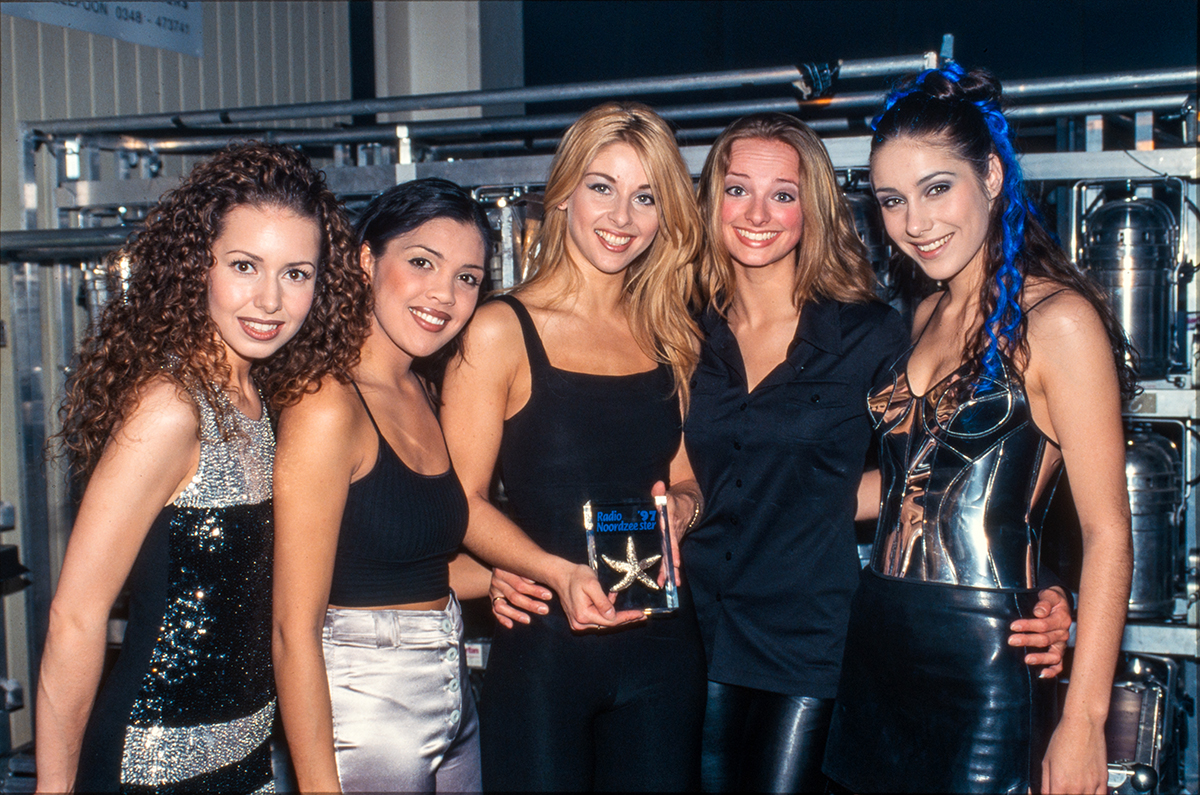

Background information
- Also known as: GTO
- Origin: Netherlands
- Genres: Pop
- Years active: 1996–2003, 2009, 2011-2013
- Labels: Sony Music
- Past members: Arlice Beeldsnijder; Marsha van de Berg; Sally Flissinger; Kelly ter Horst; Sascha Koninkx; Nadja Nooijen; Natascha Scheffers

Close II You was a Dutch girl group founded in 1996. It was then disbanded in 2001 and reformed from 2011 to 2013.

== History ==
The group was created through 1996 auditions, by the producers Eeg van Kruysdijk and Ed van Otterdijk. In August of that year, Natascha Scheffers, Sascha Koninkx, Nadja Nooijen, Arlice Beeldsnijder, and Marsha van de Berg were brought together as the original line-up and had their first hit with single "Nice & Nasty". After their first single, Arlice left the group and was replaced by Sally Flissinger (of Hermes House Band).

The girls had their biggest hit at the end of 1997 with the single "Baby Don’t Go". The success of the group took its toll and Koninkx left the group at the end of 1998, officially "because of health related issues". The group continued with the remaining four. Although only moderately successful afterwards, they continued to perform.

In May 2000, van de Berg left the group, after which Koninkx was asked to return. But only four months after the switch, Flissinger decided to leave. No replacement was found for her, and in 2001, Close II You was disbanded. Scheffers, Koninkx and Nooijen continued under the name Girls Together Outrageously (GTO). They released their only single, "I’ll be Around", which had no success. In October 2003 the girls finally disbanded.

== Members ==
Member	1996	1997	1998	1999	2000	2001	2002	2003	2009	2010	2011	2012	2013
Arlice Beeldsnijder (1996–97)													
Nadja Nooijen (1996–2003)													
Natascha Scheffers (1996–2003, 2009–13)													
Sascha Koninkx (1996–98, 2000–03, 2009–13)													
Marsha van de Berg (1996–2000, 2009–13)													
Sally Flissinger (1997–2000, 2009–13)													
Kelly ter Horst (1998–1999)													

== Discography ==
=== Studio albums ===
Title	Album details	Peak	Certifications (sales threshold)
Title	Album details	NL	Certifications (sales threshold)
Closer	Release date: 29 April 1998; Label: Piapella; Format: CD	6	NL: Gold

=== Singles ===
List of singles, with selected chart positions and certifications, showing year released and album name
Single	Year	Peak chart positions		Certifications	Album
Single	Year	NL	BE	Certifications	Album
"Nice & Nasty"	1997	32	—		Closer
"Baby Don't Go"	1998	4	39	NL: Gold	Closer
"Somebody"	1998	8	—		Closer
"Hold Me Now"	1998	46	—		Closer
"Friends"	1998	27	—		Closer
"Fuel to my Fire"	2011	34	—		
"—" denotes a single that did not chart or was not released.
