= Yakalelo =

Single by Nomads

from the album Better World
- B-side: "Remix"
- Released: 1998
- Studio: ATP Studio, France
- Genre: Dance-pop; latin pop; world music
- Length: 3:35
- Label: Epic; Saint George; Une Musique
- Songwriters: Earl Talbot; Laurent Dafurio; Philippe Jakko
- Producer: Une Musique

Nomads singles chronology
| "Yakalelo" (1998) | "Selibabi" (1998) |

Music video
- "Yakalelo" on YouTube

"Yakalelo" is a 1998 song recorded by Franco-Algerian world music group Nomads, released as the first single from their only album, Better World (1998). It was a huge hit in Europe in the summer of 1998, like in France, where it reached number two. Additionally, it peaked at number four in Belgium and number nine in the Netherlands. In 1999, it peaked at number 81 in the UK. On the Eurochart Hot 100, the single reached number 12 in August 1998.

Its music video was filmed in Morocco and its choreography was made by Mia Frye, who previously did the choreography of the 1997 song "Alane" by the Cameroonian singer Wes Madiko.

== Critical reception ==
Pan-European magazine Music & Media wrote about the song in the review of the group's album Better World, "...Yakalelo, (...) sold over a million units in France alone, thanks to massive promotional support from French TV channel TF1 (the band are signed to its music affiliate). Now, the Nomads' wanderings are taking them to the rest of Europe, via a licensing deal with Sony, with their mixture of Arab-Andalusian music blended with African rhythms and electronic touches, a la Deep Forest. So much for authenticity, but Yakalelo does have all the ingredients to become a pan-European hit..."

== Track listing ==
- 12" single, France (1998)
1. "Yakalelo" (House Remix) – 6:44
2. "Yakalelo" (Positive Club Remix) – 5:09
3. "Yakalelo" (Gipsys' Remix) – 4:06
4. "Yakalelo" (Radio Version) – 3:35
5. "Yakalelo" (LP Version) – 4:15
- CD single, Europe (1998)
1. "Yakalelo" (LP Version) – 4:15
2. "Yakalelo" (Grips Tribal Heaven Mix) – 7:29
3. "Yakalelo" (House Remix) – 6:44
- CD maxi, France (1998)
1. "Yakalelo" (House Remix) – 6:44
2. "Yakalelo" (Positive Club Remix) – 5:09
3. "Yakalelo" (Gipsy's Remix) – 4:06
4. "Yakalelo" (Radio Version) – 3:35
5. "Yakalelo" (LP Version) – 4:15

== Charts ==
=== Weekly charts ===
| Chart (1998) | Peak position |
|---|---|
| Belgium (Ultratop 50 Wallonia) | 4 |
| Europe (Eurochart Hot 100) | 12 |
| France (SNEP) | 2 |
| Netherlands (Dutch Top 40) | 9 |
| Netherlands (Single Top 100) | 10 |
| UK Singles (OCC) | 81 |

=== Year-end charts ===
| Chart (1998) | Position |
|---|---|
| Belgium (Ultratop Wallonia) | 22 |
| Netherlands (Dutch Top 40) | 56 |
| Netherlands (Single Top 100) | 92 |
