= Guilty 'til Proved Innocent! =

Studio album by The Specials
- Released: March 24, 1998
- Genre: Ska
- Length: 59:06
- Label: MCA
- Producer: Stoker

The Specials chronology
Today's Specials (1996)	Guilty 'til Proved Innocent! (1998)	BBC Sessions (1998)

Professional ratings
Review scores
Source	Rating
Allmusic	3/5 stars

Guilty 'til Proved Innocent! is a 1998 album by The Specials. It is the first studio album of new songs by the group since 1984, with songs written by both original and new group members. As in their previous album and tours during this era, the line-up featured original band members Neville Staple, Roddy Byers, Lynval Golding, and Horace Panter joined by new members Mark Adams, Adam Birch, and Jon Read. The album also featured Selecter drummer Charley 'H' Bembridge, who had been absent from Today's Specials but had been playing live with the group since 1994. While inevitably suffering comparisons to the music released by the classic 1979-1981 line up, Guilty... received far more favourable reviews than the reunited band's previous studio effort, the covers album Today's Specials, and was generally heralded as a return to form.

The song "It's You" was released as a single promoted on Modern Rock radio stations upon the album's release. "Running Away" is based on the Toots & the Maytals song "Monkey Man," which the Specials covered on their 1979 debut album.

== Track listing ==
No.	Title	Writer(s)	Length
1.	"Tears in My Beer"	Roddy Radiation Byers, The Specials	3:30
2.	"Call Me Names"	Mark Adams, The Specials	2:47
3.	"Fearful"	Horace Panter, The Specials	2:20
4.	"It's You"	Neville Staple, Sheena Staple, Tom Lowry, Kendell Smith, The Specials	3:09
5.	"Bonediggin'" (incorporates portions of the theme from the TV series The Munsters)	Byers, The Specials, Jack Marshall	4:40
6.	"All Gone Wrong"	Adams, The Specials	3:53
7.	"No Big Deal"	Adams, The Specials	3:23
8.	"Leave It Out"	Staple, Staple, Lowry, Smith, The Specials	4:03
9.	"Keep On Learning"	Byers, Lynval Golding, Adams, The Specials	2:39
10.	"Fantasize"	Adam Birch, Adams, The Specials	3:27
11.	"Place in Life"	Staple, Staple, Lowry, Smith, The Specials	3:07
12.	"Stand Up"	Staple, Staple, Lowry, Smith, The Specials	3:02
13.	"My Tears Come Falling Down Like Rain"	Golding, Panter, The Specials	3:17
14.	"The Man with No Name"	Byers, The Specials	2:44
15.	"Running Away"	Staple, Staple, Lowry, Smith, The Specials	2:53
16.	"Rat Race (Live)"	Byers	2:53
17.	"Concrete Jungle (Live)"	Byers	3:25
18.	"Gangsters (Live)"	John Bradbury, Byers, Jerry Dammers, Golding, Terry Hall, Panter, Staple	3:54

== Personnel ==
- Roddy Byers – vocals, guitar
- Lynval Golding – guitar, vocals
- Horace Panter – bass guitar
- Neville Staple – vocals
- Mark Adams – organ, piano, backing vocals
- Charley H. Bembridge – drums (credited as Harrington Bembridge)
- Adam Birch – trombone, trumpet, backing vocals
- Jon Read – trumpet, accordion
- Tim Armstrong – vocals on "Fearful"
- Lars Frederiksen – vocals on "Fearful"

Technical

- Stoker – producer, mixing, engineer
- Billy Bowers – assistant engineer
- Mike McQuaid – assistant engineer
- Paul Q. Kolderie – mixing
- Sean Slade – mixing
- Mark Trombino – mixing
- Thom Wilson – mixing
- Scott Gutierrez – mixing assistant
- Gavin Lurssen – mastering
- Shepard Fairey – artwork, art direction, design, layout design, photography
- Dave Kinsey – art direction, design, layout design
