= Colin Vearncombe discography =

- Studio albums: 11
- EPs: 6
- Live albums: 7
- Compilation albums: 6
- Singles: 34

This is the discography of English singer-songwriter Colin Vearncombe, better known by his stage name Black.

== Albums ==
=== Studio albums (released under Black) ===
List of studio albums, with selected chart positions and certifications
Title	Album details	Peak chart positions										Certifications
Title	Album details	UK	AUS	AUT	FRA	GER	NL	NZ	SPA	SWE	SWI	Certifications
Wonderful Life	Released: September 1987; Label: A&M; Formats: CD, LP, MC	3	22	6	4	9	11	21	8	30	5	BPI: Platinum; BVMI: Gold; PROMUSICAE: Platinum
Comedy	Released: 17 October 1988; Label: A&M; Formats: CD, LP, MC	32	71	—	—	38	—	—	10	37	24	BPI: Silver; PROMUSICAE: Platinum
Black	Released: 1 April 1991; Label: A&M; Formats: CD, LP, MC	42	—	—	—	—	—	—	—	—	—	
Are We Having Fun Yet?	Released: 24 May 1993; Label: Nero Schwarz; Formats: CD, LP, MC	—	—	—	—	—	—	—	—	—	—	
Between Two Churches	Released: 7 November 2005; Label: Nero Schwarz; Formats: CD, digital download	—	—	—	—	—	—	—	—	—	—	
Water on Stone	Released: 17 November 2009; Label: Nero Schwarz; Formats: CD, digital download	—	—	—	—	—	—	—	—	—	—	
Blind Faith	Released: 13 April 2015; Label: Nero Schwarz; Formats: CD, digital download	—	—	—	—	—	—	—	—	—	—	
"—" denotes items that did not chart or were not released.

=== Studio albums (released under Colin Vearncombe) ===
Title	Album details
The Accused	Released: 1 September 1999; Label: Nero Schwarz; Formats: CD, digital download
Water on Snow	Released: 1 June 2000; Label: Nero Schwarz; Formats: CD, digital download
Smoke Up Close	Released: 1 November 2002; Label: Nero Schwarz; Formats: 2xCD, digital download
The Given	Released: 3 June 2009; Label: Nero Schwarz; Formats: CD, digital download

=== Live albums ===
Title	Album details
Abbey Road Live	Released: 2 March 2000; Label: Nero Schwarz; Formats: CD, digital download
Live at the Bassline Johannesburg	Released: 23 November 2001; Label: Nero Schwarz; Formats: CD, digital download
Blackleg Vol.1 – CV Live 2003	Released: 2004; Label: Nero Schwarz; Formats: CD; Only sold at shows
Blackleg Vol.2 – CV Live 2004	Released: 2005; Label: Nero Schwarz; Formats: CD; Only sold at shows
Blackleg Vol.3 – Black Live in 2005	Released: 2007; Label: Utopian Station; Formats: digital download
Road to Nowhere – Live 2007	Released: 1 December 2007; Label: Nero Schwarz; Formats: digital download
Live 2015	Released: 24 November 2015; Label: Nero Schwarz; Formats: CD, digital download

=== Compilation albums ===
Title	Album details
Black	Released: 23 November 1987; Label: WEA; Formats: LP, MC
Master Series	Released: 1 August 1996; Label: A&M; Formats: CD, MC
Millennium Edition	Released: 2000; Label: A&M; Formats: CD; Germany-only release
The Collection	Released: 7 July 2000; Label: Spectrum Music; Formats: CD, MC
Black: C.V.	Released: 5 April 2007; Label: Nero Schwarz; Formats: CD, digital download
Any Colour You Like	Released: 11 September 2011; Label: Nero Schwarz; Formats: CD, digital download; Deluxe edition released in 2016

== EPs ==
Title	Album details
At the Tokyo Power Station	Released: 7 September 1988; Label: A&M; Formats: CD; Japan-only release
Fly Up to the Moon	Released: 1991; Label: A&M; Formats: CD
Two Churches	Released: 2005; Label: Nero Schwarz; Formats: CD
Small Pieces	Released: 2008; Label: Nero Schwarz; Formats: digital download
EP: I	Released: 1 December 2012; Label: Nero Schwarz; Formats: CD, digital download
EP: II	Released: 7 April 2013; Label: Nero Schwarz; Formats: CD, digital download

== Singles ==
List of singles as lead artist, with selected chart positions and certifications, showing year released and album name
Title	Year	Peak chart positions										Certifications	Album
Title	Year	UK	AUS	AUT	FRA	GER	IRE	NL	NZ	SPA	SWI	Certifications	Album
"Human Features"	1981	—	—	—	—	—	—	—	—	—	—		Non-album singles
"More Than the Sun"	1982	—	—	—	—	—	—	—	—	—	—		Non-album singles
"Hey Presto"	1984	118	—	—	—	—	—	—	—	—	—		Non-album singles
"More Than the Sun" (re-recording)	1985	170	—	—	—	—	—	—	—	—	—		Non-album singles
"Wonderful Life"	1986	72	—	—	—	—	—	—	—	—	—		Wonderful Life
"Everything's Coming Up Roses"	1987	76	—	8	—	11	—	—	—	15	—		Wonderful Life
"Sweetest Smile"	1987	8	87	—	38	—	8	40	41	29	—		Wonderful Life
"Wonderful Life" (reissue)	1987	8	7	1	2	2	7	10	—	7	2	BPI: Silver; BVMI: Gold; SNEP: Gold	Wonderful Life
"I'm Not Afraid"	1987	78	—	—	—	—	—	—	—	—	—		Wonderful Life
"Paradise"	1988	38	—	—	—	—	—	—	—	—	—		Wonderful Life
"The Big One"	1988	54	123	—	—	43	—	—	—	—	—		Comedy
"You're a Big Girl Now"	1988	86	—	—	—	—	—	—	—	—	—		Comedy
"Now You're Gone"	1988	66	—	—	—	—	—	—	—	—	—		Comedy
"Wonderful Life" (re-recording; US-only release)	1989	—	—	—	—	—	—	—	—	—	—		Comedy
"I Can Laugh About It Now" (Spain-only release)	1989	—	—	—	—	—	—	—	—	—	—		Comedy
"Feel Like Change"	1991	56	—	—	—	72	—	—	—	—	—		Black
"Here It Comes Again"	1991	70	—	—	—	—	—	—	—	—	—		Black
"Fly Up to the Moon" (feat. Sam Brown)	1991	89	—	—	—	—	—	—	—	—	—		Black
"Don't Take the Silence Too Hard"	1993	—	—	—	—	—	—	—	—	—	—		Are We Having Fun Yet?
"Wishing You Were Here"	1993	—	—	—	—	—	—	—	—	—	—		Are We Having Fun Yet?
"Just Like Love"	1993	—	—	—	—	—	—	—	—	—	—		Are We Having Fun Yet?
"Sleeper" (as Colin Vearncombe)	1999	—	—	—	—	—	—	—	—	—	—		The Accused
"Number One" (as Colin Vearncombe)	2000	—	—	—	—	—	—	—	—	—	—		The Accused
"In a Heartbeat" (promo-only release)	2006	—	—	—	—	—	—	—	—	—	—		Between Two Churches
"What Makes a Fool"	2008	—	—	—	—	—	—	—	—	—	—		Water on Stone
"Grievous Angel"	2008	—	—	—	—	—	—	—	—	—	—		Water on Stone
"Tonight We Cross the River"	2008	—	—	—	—	—	—	—	—	—	—		Water on Stone
"Walk on Frozen Water"	2009	—	—	—	—	—	—	—	—	—	—		Water on Stone
"Blondes"	2009	—	—	—	—	—	—	—	—	—	—		The Given
"Agnes Prayer"	2009	—	—	—	—	—	—	—	—	—	—		Non-album singles
"California"	2012	—	—	—	—	—	—	—	—	—	—		Non-album singles
"When It's All Over"/"Womanly Panther"	2015	—	—	—	—	—	—	—	—	—	—		Blind Faith
"Ashes of Angels"	2015	—	—	—	—	—	—	—	—	—	—		Blind Faith
"Wicked Game"	2015	—	—	—	—	—	—	—	—	—	—		80's Re:Covered
"—" denotes items which were not released in that country or failed to chart.
