= Killing Time =

Killing Time or Killin' Time may refer to:

- Killing time, the act of being idle
- The Killing Time, a period in late 17th century Scottish history

== Films ==
- Killing Time (1979 film), a short film directed by Fronza Woods
- Killing Time, a 1984 film nominated for a BAFTA Award for Best Short Film
- The Killing Time (film), a 1987 film starring Kiefer Sutherland
- Killing Time (1987 film), a film directed by Édouard Niermans
- Killing Time, a 1995 short film by Damian Harris starring Eric Stoltz
- Killing Time (1998 film), a British film by Bharat Nalluri
- Killing Time (2007 film), a documentary by Annika Gustafson about the Bhutanese refugees

== Literature ==
=== Fiction ===
- Killing Time (Carr novel), a 2000 novel by Caleb Carr
- Killing Time (Star Trek novel), a 1985 Star Trek: The Original Series novel by Della van Hise
- Killing Time, a 2024 novella by Alan Bennett
- Killing Time, a 1967 novel by Thomas Berger
- Killing Time, a 1988 novel by Robert J. Conley
- Killing Time, a 1996 Bill Slider mystery by Cynthia Harrod-Eagles
- Killing Time, a 2005 novel by Linda Howard
- Killing Time, a 2003 novel in the series The Invisible Detective by Justin Richards
- Killing Time, a 1961 novel by Donald Westlake

=== Non fiction ===
- Killing Time (autobiography), a 1994 autobiography by Paul Feyerabend
- Killing Time: An Investigation into the Death-Row Case of Mumia Abu-Jamal, a 2003 book by Dave Lindorff
- Killing Time: Archaeology and the First World War, a 2007 book by Nicholas J. Saunders
- Killing Time: Life in the Arkansas Penitentiary, a 1977 photography book by Bruce Jackson
- Killing Time: The First Full Investigation into the Unsolved Murders of Nicole Brown Simpson and Ronald Goldman, a 1996 book by Donald Freed and Raymond P. Briggs
- The Killing Time: German U-Boats 1914-18, a 1972 book by Edwyn Gray

== Music ==
=== Groups ===
- Killing Time (American band), a hardcore punk band
- Killing Time (Australian band), now known as Mantissa, a hard rock band

=== Albums ===
- Killing Time (Bayside album) or the title song, 2011
- Killing Time (Girl album) or the title song, 1987
- Killing Time (Massacre album) or the title song, 1981
- Killing Time (Mitchell Butel album), 2012
- Killing Time (Tina Cousins album), 1998
- Killing Time, or the title song, by Sweet Savage, 1996
- Killing Time, or the title song, by U.K. Subs, 1988
- Killin' Time (Clint Black album), or the title song (see below), 1989
- Killin' Time (Gasolin' album), or the title song, 1978

=== Songs ===
- "Killing Time (Megadeth song)", by Megadeth from The Sick, the Dying... and the Dead!, 2022
- "Killing Time", by The Celibate Rifles from Sideroxylon, 1983
- "Killing Time", by City and Colour from If I Should Go Before You, 2015
- "Killing Time", by Cold Chisel from Blood Moon, 2019, also covered by Jimmy Barnes in 2020
- "Killing Time", by Destiny's Child from Destiny's Child, 1998
- "Killing Time", by Grave Digger from Tunes of War, 1996
- "Killing Time", by Hed PE from Broke, 2000
- "Killing Time", by Hollywood Rose from The Roots of Guns N' Roses, 2004
- "Killing Time", by Infected Mushroom from Legend of the Black Shawarma, 2009
- "Killing Time", by Jets Overhead from Bridges, 2006
- "Killing Time", by Joss Stone from Mind Body & Soul, 2004
- "Killing Time", by Magdalena Bay from Imaginal Disk, 2024
- "Killing Time", by Maserati from Enter the Mirror, 2020
- "Killing Time", by Obituary from The End Complete, 1992
- "Killing Time", by Pennywise from About Time, 1995
- "Killing Time", by Terrorvision from Formaldehyde, 1992
- "Killing Time", by The Tragically Hip from The Tragically Hip, 1987
- "Killing Time", by Triumph from Thunder Seven, 1984
- "Killin' Time" (Clint Black song), 1989
- "Killin' Time" (Tina Cousins song), 1997
- "Killin' Time", by Fred Knoblock and Susan Anton, 1981

== Television ==
- Killing Time (TV series), a 2011 Australian drama series
- "Killing Time" (Beavis and Butt-head), a 1994 episode
- "Killing Time" (Time Squad), a 2001 episode
- "Killin' Time" (Quantum Leap), a 1992 episode

== Other art, entertainment, and media ==
- Killing Time, a 1999 poetry collection by Simon Armitage
- Killing Time (video game), a 1995 first-person shooter originally for 3DO
- Killing Time, a video artwork by Sam Taylor-Wood
