= Fly Up to the Moon =

1991 song by Black

Single by Black featuring Sam Brown

from the album Black
- B-side: "You Lift Me Up": "What You Are"
- Released: 15 July 1991
- Length: 3:07
- Label: A&M
- Songwriter(s): Black
- Producer(s): Robin Millar

Black featuring Sam Brown singles chronology
"Here It Comes Again" (1991)	"Fly Up to the Moon" (1991)	"Don't Take the Silence Too Hard" (1993)

"Fly Up to the Moon" is a song by English singer-songwriter Black, released by A&M on 15 July 1991 as the third and final single from his third studio album, Black. The song, which features guest vocals from Sam Brown, was written by Black and produced by Robin Millar. It reached number 89 in the UK Singles Chart.

== Background ==
In 1991, Black said of the song, "I did intend [for] 'Fly Up to the Moon' to be a kind of microcosm of the LP. I felt I'd already written a protest song in 'Feel Like Change', but what both songs share is this sense of 'I'm just sick of this'. Not that you're any more compassionate or you're actually doing anything about it, it's just that 'I'm sick of this', and what an alterative might be or outlining why. 'Feel Like Change' is a kind of 'why' and 'Fly Up to the Moon' is 'what might happen then'. The song was recorded as a duet with guest vocals from Sam Brown. Black recalled in 1997 of how he came to work with her, "We share the same friends, acquaintances and an A&M sojourn. She seemed right, so I asked her."

== Release ==
"Fly Up to the Moon" was released in the UK on 15 July 1991. The 7-inch and CD formats included two new non-album tracks, "You Lift Me Up" and "What You Are", with the CD format adding a third extra track, a version of Janet Jackson's 1986 hit "Control". A digipack CD edition featured three other new recordings which were exclusive to the release, including a cover of Wreckless Eric's 1977 song "Whole Wide World". The single failed to reach the top 75 in the UK Singles Chart and reached its peak of number 89 in its first week on 27 July 1991. On 16 November 1991, the song peaked at number 4 on the Music & Media National Airplay chart for Switzerland's most played records on the national station DRS 3 and major privates. It was Black's last release on A&M.

== Music video ==
The song's music video did not feature Black or Sam Brown themselves, but clay models of them in a stop motion animation. The video was developed by Moving Picture Company, with Mike Olley as the director and Juliet Naylor as the producer.

== Critical reception ==
Upon its release, Steve Lamacq of NME wrote, "Black strolls back into the limelight with a song which sounds like a mis-timed Christmas record. The Goddess Sam Brown is roped in on guest vocals, purely to get a good review from me. There are shades of novelty to this on first hearing, but some gorgeous contempt hidden in the lyrics." A reviewer for the Coventry Evening Telegraph commented, "I quite like this. Colin Vearncombe's got a pleasantly resonating voice. Not as good as 'Wonderful Life', though." Tony Jasper of the Manchester Evening News noted the "captivating team-up" of Black and the "lucious" Sam Brown. Andrew Hirst of the Huddersfield Daily Examiner was less positive, calling it an "agonisingly slow dirge that drones on about a flight of fantasy from a bleak world blighted by depression".

In a review of Black, Robbert Tilli of Music & Media called the song "as pleasing as the 60s duets by Nancy Sinatra and Lee Hazlewood" and added, "The inventive marching tempo yields a chorus that gives the song just that little bit of catchiness that EHR stations will love." Paul Lester of Melody Maker drew similar comparisons but was more critical, stating, "'Fly Up to the Moon' is, basically, Nancy Sinatra and Lee Hazelwood for people with no wit or imagination, or The Beautiful South." Martin Rigby of the Liverpool Echo considered the song to be the album's "only infuritating point" as the "delightful" Sam Brown "has to grit her teeth and deliver the line (probably drawn from John Cooper Clarke), "So this is how the world ends – not with a bang but with a wimpy". I mean, come on, the word cliché was invented especially for a naff line like that!" Michael Sutton of AllMusic retrospectively noted the "deceptively romantic chorus", writing, "The protagonist dreams of escaping his troubled world, but his lover refuses to join him in the track's startling conclusion."

== Track listing ==
7-inch single (UK and Europe)

1. "Fly Up to the Moon" – 3:07
2. "You Lift Me Up" – 3:51
3. "What You Are" – 4:31

CD single (UK and Europe)

1. "Fly Up to the Moon" – 3:07
2. "You Lift Me Up" – 3:51
3. "What You Are" – 4:31
4. "Control" – 4:33

CD digipack single (UK and Europe)

1. "Fly Up to the Moon" – 3:07
2. "Whole Wide World" – 5:52
3. "Under Wraps" – 4:34
4. "What's Right Is Right" – 5:04

== Personnel ==
"Fly Up to the Moon"

- Black – vocals, acoustic guitar
- Sam Brown – vocals ("Fly Up to the Moon")
- Martin Green – bass clarinet, clarinet, tenor saxophone, brass arrangement
- Steve Sidwell – trumpet
- Rick Taylor – trombone
- Pete Davis – keyboards, programming
- Bob Andrews – Hammond organ
- Gordon Morgan – electric guitar
- Brad Lang – bass
- Roy Martin – drums

Production

- Robin Millar – production and arrangement (all tracks except "Under Wraps" and "What's Right Is Right")
- Dave Dix – production ("Under Wraps" and "What's Right Is Right")
- Jim Abbiss – mixing ("Whole Wide World")

Other

- John Warwicker – design
- Graham Wood – design, painting
- Thomas Gidley – painting

== Charts ==
Chart (1991)	Peak position
UK Singles Chart (OCC)	89
