= List of Irish Traveller–related depictions and documentaries =

Irish Travellers have been depicted in film, radio, and print. Some depictions have been both negative, while some have been with care and sympathy. This page cites Irish Traveller-related books, documentaries, films, and other forms of media documentation and/or depiction.

== Documentaries ==
- King Of The Gypsies (1995) — a documentary film about Bartley Gorman, undefeated Bareknuckle Champion of Ireland and Great Britain.
- My Big Fat Gypsy Wedding (2010–2015) and spinoff series Big Fat Gypsy Weddings — a Channel 4 television documentary series about Irish Traveller weddings.
- John Connors: The Travellers. RTÉ - (2017) A three documentary series about the history and culture of Irish travellers which won the 2018 IFTA for best documentary series.
- Blood of the Travellers, a 2011 RTÉ broadcast documentary of Francis Barrett interviewing Travellers and social historians and using DNA to find out the origin of the Travellers as a group.
- Gypsy Blood (2012), a hard hitting observational documentary screened by channel 4, about two bare-knuckle fighting Pavee families noted for their bare-knuckle fighting passed on from father to son.
- When Paddy Met Sally (January 2012) is a two-part documentary that aired on Channel 5 in the UK, which charted the adventures of Speaker's wife Sally Bercow as she became the first outsider to stay on Paddy Doherty's Traveller site in north Wales.
- I Am Traveller, RTÉ 2016. An authored piece by John Connors, directed by Kim Bartley of Frontline Films and nominated for an IFTA for best documentary.
- Southpaw: The Francis Barrett Story — a documentary following Galway boxer Francis (Francie) Barrett for three years and showing Francie overcoming discrimination as he progresses up the amateur boxing ranks to eventually carry the Irish flag and box for Ireland at the age of 19 during the 1996 Olympics in Atlanta. The film won the Audience Prize at the 1999 New York Irish Film Festival.
- Traveller, a documentary by Alen MacWeeney
- Unsettled: From Tinker to Traveller (2012) by Aoife Kelleher, Kim Bartley and Liam McGrath about two Californian anthropologists, George and Sharon Gmelch, returning to Dublin after 40 years to reunite with the travelers they lived with and studied.
- "Patrick: A Young Traveller Lost" (2023) by Alan Bradley about the devastating suicide crises within the Irish Traveller Community focussing on the story of 12 year old Patrick McDonagh.
- Tin Castle (2026) — a Irish-French documentary focusing on the O'Reilly family, which aims to depict the Irish Traveller Community through the eyes of children rather than through a more brutal or folkloric lens.

== Movies ==
- No Resting Place (1951)
- Cathy Come Home (1966) for a section of the film. After being evicted from their home, Cathy and her family go to a caravan site populated by Irish Travellers. At a council meeting, they are denounced as "not real Gypsies". Their caravans are attacked with bricks and then set on fire, leading to the deaths of some children. This part of the film includes voice-over discussions with Travellers about their lifestyles and the harassment they often faced.
- Flight of the Doves (1970)
- The Field (1990) — a film in which farmer Bull McCabe's only son runs away with a family of Travellers.
- Into the West (1992) — a film that tells the story of two Traveller boys running away from their drab home in Dublin.
- Trojan Eddie (1996) – crime drama film directed by Gillies MacKinnon and starring Stephen Rea, Richard Harris, Stuart Townsend, Aislín McGuckin, Brendan Gleeson, and Sean McGinley. The soundtrack features "Tinker's Lullaby", written and performed by Pecker Dunne.
- Traveller (1997) — A film, starring Bill Paxton, Mark Wahlberg, and Julianna Margulies, about a man joining a group of nomadic con artists in rural North Carolina.
- Snatch (2000) — a film featuring Brad Pitt as a comically stereotyped "Pikey" and rogue, who is also a bare-knuckle boxing champion. He is portrayed as having a deep love of his mother and family, in keeping with true life Traveller traditions, which place great emphasis upon family.
- Man About Dog (2004) — A film featuring a group of Irish Traveller characters.
- Pavee Lackeen: The Traveller Girl (2005) — a film directed by Perry Ogden that tells the story of an Irish Traveller girl (Winnie Maughan), her family, and her struggles in life. Most of the characters are played by the Maughan family themselves, including Winnie, the youngest daughter.
- Strength and Honour (2007) — film dealing with a man joining a Traveller boxing tournament in order to win money for his son's operation.
- Fish Tank (2009) - an Irish Traveller camp is one of the main sites of the film and the male lead, played by Michael Fassbender, is implied to be an Irish Traveller.
- King of the Travellers (2013) - In the Travelling community, a young man must put his past behind him and settle a long running feud between two families so he can be with the love of his life.
- Trespass Against Us (2016) - a film featuring an Irish Traveller family, the Cutlers, in which Brendan Gleeson plays the patriarch Colby and Michael Fassbender plays his son Chad.
- Float Like a Butterfly (2018) - a film focusing on an Irish Traveller girl who wants to be a boxer.

== Music ==
- Songs from The Travellin' People by Pecker Dunne and Margaret Barry
- Ewan MacColl's 1964 album The Travelling People was entirely composed of songs about Gypsies and travellers. However, the song The Gypsy is a Gentleman contained some derogatory comments about Irish Travellers such as "if you find a pony grazing in your garden plot, don't blame the noble Gypsy but that awful tinker lot!"

== Non Fiction ==
- The Tinker Menace; the diary of an Irish Traveller by Laura Angela Collins is a true story about an Irish Traveller family forced into Irish institutions such as the Magdalene Laundries, Industrial Schools in Ireland and the fight the Collins family are made go on to try gain justice from the State and Catholic Church.
- The Road To God Knows Where by Sean Maher. Autobiography of a Traveller, born in Tullamore in 1932. Nan: The Life of an Irish Traveling Woman by Sharon Gmelch. Biography of Nan Donohue, an Irish Traveller, born in 1919 in Granard, Westmeath. Recounts her travels and experiences in the North and west of Ireland, England, and Dublin
- Photographer Joseph-Philippe Bevillard has since 2010, documented the lives of the Irish Traveller in his photostream The photostream is on Instagram since 2019 as "jpbevillard_colour". In 2014 he formed the Irish Travellers Photo Workshop which takes place every year. 2022 he published a book with his photos of the Irish Travellers: "Mincéirs"

== Novels ==
- See You Down the Road by Kim Ablon Whitney — A novel about Travelers in the United States (written for readers aged 14 and older).
- Fork in the Road, a novel by Denis Hamill
- The Killing of the Tinkers, a novel by Ken Bruen
- Traveller Wedding — Novel by film director Graham Jones.
- The Tent and Other Stories by Liam O'Flaherty. Jonathan Cape (London, England): 1926.
- The Blue Horse, a novel by Marita Conlon-McKenna
- Child of the Prophecy, by Juliet Marillier – Fainne's friend, Darragh, and his family are known as "tinkers" and horse-traders who travel the length of Ireland every year
- Falling Glass, a novel by Adrian McKinty - the main character is a Pavee, and there is much discussion of Pavee lifestyle
- King of the Travelers, by Bartley Gorman and Peter Walsh, An account of Bareknuckle champion Bartley Gormans life.
- In the novel Winter's Bone by Daniel Woodrell, the protagonist Ree and the rest of her clan are named Dolly, a form of the Irish name Ó Dathlaoich, and are descended from the "Walking People." (See Muintir Murchada#Family surnames) The Dollys also exhibit much of the "clannishness" and consciously preserved "differentness" often found in small ethnic minorities.

== Television series ==
- Crossing Lines main character Tommy McConnell (played by Richard Flood) comes from a family of Irish Travellers from Northern Ireland, although he is estranged from them due to their criminal activities. In episode 8 of season 2 ("Family Ties") his family ends up in the middle of a drug trafficking/murder investigation by Scotland Yard, and Tommy gets back in contact with them in order to find out the truth.
- Dragonsdawn - by Anne McCaffrey includes as major characters the Connell family, who are part of a group of Irish Travellers.
- Glenroe (1983–2001) — A spin-off of The Riordans featuring the Connors, a family of settled Travellers.
- Jack Taylor involves a murder plot amidst a pair of feuding Irish Traveller families.
- Jim Henson's The Storyteller (1988) — The episode "Fearnot" is a folk tale of a youth in search of fear. He befriends a "Tinker" on his journey.
- Killinaskully — This RTÉ Irish sitcom features a Traveller character named Pa Connors, played by Pat Shortt.
- Law & Order: Criminal Intent, Season 2, Episode 21, Graansha — this episode of the NBC television show focuses on the murder of a probation officer who hailed from an Irish Traveller family.
- Pavee Lackeen (Traveller Girl) — 2005 documentary-style film depicting the life of a young Traveller girl that features non-actors in the lead roles. Its director and co-writer, Perry Ogden, won an IFTA Award in the category of Breakthrough Talent.
- The Riches (2007-2008) — An FX television series starring Eddie Izzard and Minnie Driver as Wayne and Dahlia Malloy, the father and mother of an American family of an Irish clan. The series revolves around their decision to steal the identities of a dead "buffer" family and hide out in their lavish mansion in suburban Baton Rouge, Louisiana.
- The Riordans (1964–1979) — In this Irish television soap opera, many issues affecting the Traveller community were portrayed through the challenges faced by the Maher family.
- The Sons of Anarchy S5/E5 ("Orca Shrugged", 2012) features a bare-knuckle fight between Irish American Jax Teller and Irish native Galen O'Shay, through which they work out their differences. This fight echoes others throughout the season (though not always bare-knuckle), through which SAMCRO members (e.g., Tig Trager and Herman Kozik) express their tensions and bond. In his recap of "Orca Shrugged", Hitfix's Geoff Berkshire writes: "The bare knuckle brawl between Jax and Galen O'Shay made me wonder if anyone on the "Sons" staff was influenced by the documentary "Knuckle." (That wouldn't be a bad thing.)
- Singin' Bernie Walsh — Character created and played by Irish comedian Katherine Lynch, who is known for her album Friends In Hi Aces and her singles "Dundalk, Dundalk", "Don't Knock Knock 'Til You've Tried It", and "Stand By Your Van". Singin' Bernie Walsh featured in both of Lynch's RTÉ comedy series Wonderwomen and Working Girls, which show her attempts at topping the Irish charts and achieving "inter-county-nental" fame.
- Without a Trace — an episode of this CBS television show features a woman of Irish Traveller descent who had left the community and gone missing.
- Moone Boy - Martin Moone begins dating an Irish Traveller girl whose family lives in the field next to the Moone family's house.
- Norah's Traveller Academy, RTÉ2, January 2015. Norah Casey mentors 4 creative Traveller women in an Irish television series.
- Peaky Blinders - The Shelby Family and The Lee Family are Travellers. In the series Polly Gray (née Shelby) tells her son Michael that his grandmother was Birdie Boswell. The Boswells were for centuries one of England's largest and most important Traveller families. The Boswell clan were a large extended family of Travellers, and in old Nottinghamshire dialect the word bos'll was used as a term for Travellers in general.
- Glue (TV series) - TV series revolving around the murder of a Traveller teenager in Hampshire, England.

== Theatre ==
- By the Bog of Cats (1998) - written by Marina Carr
- Mobile the Play (2010) — written and performed by Michael Collins and directed by Mick Rafferty
- The Tinker's Curse (2007) - written by Michael Harding
- The Tinker's Wedding (premiered in 1909) - written by J.M. Synge
- The Trailer of Bridget Dinnigan (2010) — written and directed by Dylan Tighe

== See also ==
- Main article bibliography
