= Mastermind (Tina Cousins album) =

Studio album by Tina Cousins
- Released: 13 September 2005
- Recorded: 2004–2005
- Genre: Dance-pop, club
- Length: 54:02
- Label: Big Records
- Producer: Louie Nicastro, Tom Maddicott, Kenny Hayes

Tina Cousins chronology
Killing Time (2000)	Mastermind (2005)

Mastermind is the second studio album by the British singer Tina Cousins. It was released on 13 September 2005 via Big Records label. It entered the Australian ARIA Album Charts and peaked at #48.

Cousins has said of the album, "The album is cooler than Killing Time, there's a couple more ballads and a reworked version of one of my older tracks, but my favourite is definitely the title track "Mastermind"."

The album includes the singles, "Hymn", "Wonderful Life", "Come to Me" and "Pretty Young Thing".

== Track listing ==
All songs written by Louie Nicastro and Tom Maddicott unless noted.

1. "Queen of the World"
2. "Wonderful Life" (Colin Vearncombe)
3. "Move in Time"
4. "Mastermind"
5. "Pretty Young Thing" (Stella Katsoudas/Steve Torch/Walter Turbitt)
6. "Hypnotise Me"
7. "Hymn" (Warren Cann/Chris Cross/Billy Currie/Midge Ure)
8. "Come to Me"
9. "Increase the Dose"
10. "Tomorrow's Tomorrow"
11. "Rip It Up"
12. "Alive"
13. "Wonderful Life (ballad version)" (Colin Vearncombe)

== Charts ==
Chart (2005)	Peak position
Australian Albums Chart	48
