= Now You're Gone =

Now You're Gone may refer to:

- Now You're Gone – The Album, a 2008 album by Basshunter
  - "Now You're Gone" (Basshunter song), the title song
- "Now You're Gone" (Black song), 1988
- "Now You're Gone" (Whitesnake song), 1989
- "Now You're Gone", 1981 song by Bucks Fizz. B-side to "The Land of Make Believe"
- Now You're Gone (Tom Walker song), 2019
