= Here It Comes Again =

Here It Comes Again may refer to:

- "Here It Comes Again" (The Fortunes song), 1965
- "Here It Comes Again" (Melanie C song), 2003
- Here It Comes Again (Black song), 1991
- "Here It Comes Again", a song by Korn on the album Take a Look in the Mirror
- "Here It Comes Again", a song by The Jesus and Mary Chain on their Darklands EP release
- "Here It Comes Again", a song by The Proclaimers on the album Life With You.

== See also ==
- Here It Comes (disambiguation)
