= Paradise (Black song) =

Single by Black

from the album Wonderful Life
- B-side: Dagger Reel
- Released: 4 January 1988
- Length: 4:51 (album version); 4:02 (single version)
- Label: A&M
- Songwriter(s): Colin Vearncombe; Dave Dix
- Producer(s): Dave Dix

Black singles chronology
"I'm Not Afraid" (1987)	"Paradise" (1988)	"The Big One" (1988)

Official audio
- "Paradise" on YouTube

"Paradise" is a song by English singer-songwriter Black, which was released in 1988 as the fifth and final single from his debut studio album Wonderful Life. The song was written by Black and Dave "Dix" Dickie, and produced by Dix. "Paradise" reached number 38 in the UK Singles Chart and remained in the top 100 for four weeks.

== Critical reception ==
On its release, David Quantick of New Musical Express commented, "Vearncombe has the knack of getting up melancholy better than anyone apart from Peter Hook's bass guitar. Bertolt Brecht coined the term einverstaendis to convey the idea of a happy resignation, an ungrudging acceptance of things. With Black we have that best of things, einverstaendis you can dance to." Lawrence Donegan, as guest reviewer for Record Mirror, stated, "As with all of Black's slower songs, the percussion track immediately grabs your attention. As long as he steers clear of James Hamilton disco territory, he can't really fail." Paul Massey of the Evening Express described the song as "mellow, but not a big hit".

== Formats ==
7-inch single
No.	Title	Length
1.	"Paradise"	4:02
2.	"Dagger Reel"	4:58

12-inch and CD single
No.	Title	Notes	Length
1.	"Paradise"		4:51
2.	"Dagger Reel"		4:58
3.	"Sometimes for the Asking"	New Version	5:00

== Personnel ==
Credits are adapted from the UK CD single liner notes and the Wonderful Life CD booklet.

Paradise

- Black – vocals
- Dave Dix – keyboards, programming
- Tina Labrinski, Sara Lamarra, Doreen Edwards – backing vocals

Production

- Dave Dix – producer, mixer
- Bill Price – mixing on "Paradise"
- Dave Anderson – engineer on "Paradise" and "Sometimes for the Asking"
- Andy McPherson – engineer on "Dagger Reel"

Other

- Perry Ogden – photography
- John Warwicker – art direction, design
- Jeremy Pearce – design

== Charts ==
Chart (1988)	Peak position
UK Singles (OCC)	38
