= Forever (Tina Cousins song) =

1999 single by Tina Cousins

Single by Tina Cousins

from the album Killing Time
- Released: 28 June 1999
- Length: 3:59
- Label: Jive; Eastern Bloc
- Songwriters: Mark Topham; Karl Twigg
- Producers: Mark Topham; Karl Twigg

Tina Cousins singles chronology
"Thank ABBA for the Music" (1999)	"Forever" (1999)	"Angel" (1999)

Music video
- "Forever" on YouTube

"Forever" is a song written by Mark Topham and Karl Twigg, and recorded by English singer Tina Cousins. It was released on 28 June 1999, by Jive Records and Eastern Bloc, as the fifth single from her debut album, Killing Time (1998). In Australia, it became a top-20 hit and was awarded a gold sales certification.

The single was originally announced as reaching number 45 in the UK Singles Chart; however, a technical error at the time meant sales from two major British music stores (Virgin Megastores and Our Price) were not counted, causing a new chart to be compiled. On the corrected chart, the single reached a higher peak of number 38. The accompanying music video was directed by Iain Titterington.

== Track listings ==
- UK CD1
1. "Forever" (radio edit) – 3:59
2. "Forever" (W.I.P. Manaña mix) – 6:05
3. "Forever" (Klubbheads 'Dutch FF' mix) – 9:07
- UK CD2 and Australasian CD single
1. "Forever" (radio edit) – 3:59
2. "Killin' Time" ('99 radio edit) – 4:05
3. "Forever" (W.I.P. Manaña mix) – 6:05
4. "Killin' Time" (Sash! radio edit) – 3:30
- UK cassette single
1. "Forever" (radio edit) – 3:59
2. "Forever" (W.I.P. Manaña mix) – 6:05
- European CD single
1. "Forever" (radio edit) – 3:59
2. "Forever" (12-inch) – 6:05

== Charts ==
=== Weekly charts ===
Chart (1999)	Peak position
Australia (ARIA)	14
Belgium (Ultratip Bubbling Under Flanders)	9
Scotland Singles (OCC)	26
Sweden (Sverigetopplistan)	47
UK Singles (OCC)	38
UK Indie (OCC)	4

=== Year-end charts ===
Chart (1999)	Position
Australia (ARIA)	63

== Certifications ==
Region	Certification	Certified units/sales
Australia (ARIA)	Gold	35,000^{^}
^{^} Shipments figures based on certification alone.
