= Are we having fun yet? =

Are We Having Fun Yet? may refer to:

- The catchphrase of Zippy the Pinhead
- Advertising slogan which is part of the premise of the television show Party Down
- Are We Having Fun Yet? (album), by the artist Black, 1993
- Are We Having Fun?, album by the band Weathers, 2023
- "Are We Having Fun Yet?", a bonus video on the DVD The Greatest Hits – Why Try Harder by Fatboy Slim
