= Pray (Tina Cousins song) =

1998 single by Tina Cousins

Single by Tina Cousins

from the album Killing Time
- Released: 2 November 1998
- Length: 3:56
- Label: Jive; Eastern Bloc
- Songwriters: Mark Topham; Karl Twigg
- Producers: TTW (Topham, Twigg, Pete Waterman)

Tina Cousins singles chronology
"Mysterious Times" (1998)	"Pray" (1998)	"Killin' Time '99" (1999)

Music video
- "Pray" on YouTube

"Pray" is a song by British singer Tina Cousins. It was written by Mark Topham and Karl Twigg and released on 2 November 1998 as the third single from her debut album, Killing Time (1999). The song was her second consecutive top-20 hit in the United Kingdom and her first top-10 hit in Australia, where it achieved gold status. In Europe, "Pray" reached the top 10 in Finland and peaked at number 48 on the Eurochart Hot 100 in November 1998.

"Actually I've appeared on loads of religious programmes since "Pray" was released. I was really surprised at first, because the song is more about respecting the environment we live in, rather than any particular religion. But my mum and dad were delighted."

— Tina Cousins talking about the song.

== Critical reception ==
AllMusic editor MacKenzie Wilson remarked that the high-tempo R&B sounds on "Pray" "are so energetic and exciting, the club/dance scene can only be heightened". Michael Paoletta from Billboard complimented it as a "hugely anthemic single". Talia Jackson from Dayton Daily News felt that on the "Gothic-style track, she appeals for salvation while a futuristic cadence creates a compelling sound." Chuck Campbell from Knoxville News Sentinel said "it's hard to escape the overwhelming hope and positivity of the histrionic first single", "Pray". Pan-European magazine Music & Media wrote, "Ms. Cousins' first real claim to fame was her presence on Sash!'s huge hit "Mysterious Times" earlier this year. With this effort, she proves that she is perfectly capable of going it alone. This song is well suited to a fairly broad range of formats, and should do well on the dancefloor as well."

== Chart performance ==
"Pray" entered the top 10 in Finland and Scotland and the top 20 in Flanders, Spain and the United Kingdom. In the latter country, the single peaked at number 20 during its first week on the UK Singles Chart, on 15 November 1998, and reached number five on the UK Indie Chart. "Pray" was also a top-30 hit in Sweden, a top-40 hit in the Netherlands and a top-50 hit on the Eurochart Hot 100, where it reached number 48 in November 1998. Outside Europe, it peaked at number eight in Australia and number 48 in New Zealand. "Pray" was awarded with a gold record in Australia, after 35,000 units were shipped.

== Music video ==
A music video was produced to promote the single. It was filmed in the North East England town of Whitley Bay. It features scenes shot in the town's Spanish City leisure complex which was by the late 1990s past its heyday and only a few years away from partial demolition and dereliction. Other scenes are staged in St Mary's Lighthouse, around its island, along the coast and in a terraced back street at the rear of Whitley Bay Baptist Church.

== Track listings ==
- UK CD single
1. "Pray" (radio edit) – 3:55
2. "Pray" (W.I.P. In the Church mix) – 7:06
3. "Pray" (original version) – 4:23
- UK 12-inch single

A1. "Pray" (W.I.P. In the Church mix) – 7:06
B1. "Pray" (W.I.P. In the Church dub) – 6:00
B2. "Pray" (original version) – 4:23

- UK cassette single
1. "Pray" (radio edit) – 3:55
2. "Pray" (W.I.P. In the Church mix) – 7:06
- European CD single
1. "Pray" (radio edit) – 3:55
2. "Pray" (original version) – 4:23
- Australian CD single
1. "Pray" (radio edit) – 3:55
2. "Pray" (Goodyear and Leal radio edit) – 3:59
3. "Angel" (Fishead radio edit) – 4:12
4. "Angel" (Tall Paul mix) – 7:00
5. "Pray" (W.I.P. In the Church mix) – 7:06
6. "Pray" (Goodyear and Leal remix) – 8:00

== Charts ==
=== Weekly charts ===
Chart (1998–2000)	Peak position
Australia (ARIA)	8
Belgium (Ultratop 50 Flanders)	12
Europe (Eurochart Hot 100)	48
Finland (Suomen virallinen lista)	10
France (SNEP)	59
Netherlands (Dutch Top 40)	29
Netherlands (Single Top 100)	34
New Zealand (Recorded Music NZ)	48
Scotland Singles (Official Charts)	9
Spain (Promusicae)	13
Sweden (Sverigetopplistan)	23
UK Singles (Official Charts)	20
UK Indie (Official Charts)	5

=== Year-end charts ===
Chart (2000)	Position
Australia (ARIA)	78

== Certifications ==
Region	Certification	Certified units/sales
Australia (ARIA)	Gold	35,000^{^}
^{^} Shipments figures based on certification alone.

== Release history ==
Region	Date	Format(s)	Label(s)	Ref.
United Kingdom	2 November 1998	12-inch vinyl; CD; cassette	Jive; Eastern Bloc	
United States	22 May 2000	Hot adult contemporary radio	Republic	
United States	23 May 2000	Contemporary hit radio	Republic	
