= Knuckle (film) =

- Poster
- Directed by: Ian Palmer
- Produced by: Teddy Leifer; Ian Palmer
- Cinematography: Michael Doyle; Ian Palmer
- Edited by: Ollie Huddleston
- Music by: Ilan Eshkeri
- Production company: Rise Films
- Release date: January 21, 2011 (Sundance)
- Running time: 96 minutes
- Country: Ireland

Knuckle is a 2011 Irish documentary film about the secretive world of Irish Traveller bare-knuckle boxing. The film was made in stages over 12 years. The film premiered at the 2011 Sundance Film Festival. This film follows a history of violent feuding between rival clans.

== Synopsis ==
This film follows 12 years in the lives of three Irish Traveller families (Joyces, Nevins, and Quinn-McDonaghs) and their bitter feuds and fights. The film explores the reasons why they hold these fights and explores in-depth these families' secret life, which is barely known to outsiders of the Traveller community. The real reason for the feud among the families is never revealed, as they will not talk about it to outsiders.

== Cast ==
- James Quinn McDonagh
- Michael Quinn McDonagh
- Paddy Quinn McDonagh
- Christy (Ditsy) Walford
- Thomas (Spike) Nevin
- Ian Palmer
- Davey Nevin
- Joe (Big Joe) Joyce

== Reception ==
The film received a mostly positive response from critics. On Rotten Tomatoes it has an approval rating of 93% based on reviews from 43 critics.

== See also ==
- List of Irish Traveller-related depictions and documentaries
