= Rajon Music Group =

Australian independent record label

- Parent company: Sony Music Entertainment; Big Records
- Founded: July 2000; 24 years ago
- Founder: John Evans
- Genre: Various
- Country of origin: Australia
- Official website: rajon.com.au

The Rajon Music Group was formed in July 2000 by John Evans after the merger of 3 leading independent record labels (Rajon Entertainment, RedX Entertainment and Startel Entertainment). Consequently, the group became one of the largest independent record labels in Australia.

Rajon's core business was TV compilations; budget, mid price and catalogue marketing and concepts; single artist development, third party licensing; synchronisations for TV and film, and premium CD's. The company has also expanded into the DVD/Video market with the launch of Rajon Vision in December 2001.

Rajon owned and controlled a very successful catalogue of artists, which has earned many awards including 32 gold records, 6 platinum records and 42 major industry awards.

Rajon Music Group was distributed by Sony Music in Australia who supplies product to major music and DVD retailers such Sanity, HMV, Blockbuster, K-Mart, Target, Myer/Grace, Leading Edge. The company has recently expanded the operation into New Zealand, Asia and the UK. Distribution is handled by Sony Music in Asia and Zomba/BMG in New Zealand.

Rajon was a member of ARIA (Australian Record Industry Association) and AMCOS (Australasian Mechanical Copyrights Owners Society).

== Rajon acquisition of Big Records ==
Through an acquisition of 90% Rajon took control of Big Records. Prior to the acquisition, Big Records was an independent record company established by Paul Paoliello and Peter "Reggie" Bowman. New artists that fell under the Rajon umbrella included Tina Cousins, The Teenage Idols, 888, Melissa Tkautz, Groove Armada, Ashanti, Melanie C, and Hanson.

Rajon was sold to the digital media and marketing firm Destra Corporation in 2005. Destra's purchase of these sorts of businesses over three years failed to produce a media empire where all the business units integrated with each other. Destra collapsed in 2008.

== See also ==
- List of record labels
- Sony Music
- Big Records
