= I'm Not Afraid (Black song) =

Single by Black

from the album Wonderful Life
- B-side: "Have It Your Own Way"
- Released: 16 October 1987
- Length: 5:02 (album version); 3:57 (single version)
- Label: A&M
- Songwriter(s): Colin Vearncombe; Dave Dix
- Producer(s): Robin Millar

Black singles chronology
"Wonderful Life" (1987)	"I'm Not Afraid" (1987)	"Paradise" (1988)

Official audio
- "I'm Not Afraid" on YouTube

"I'm Not Afraid" is a song by English singer-songwriter Black, which was released in 1987 as the fourth single from his debut studio album Wonderful Life. The song was written by Black and Dave "Dix" Dickie, and produced by Robin Millar. "I'm Not Afraid" reached number 78 in the UK Singles Chart and remained in the top 100 for three weeks.

== Critical reception ==
On its release, Jerry Smith of Music Week commented, "With Vearncombe's current run of success, this Robin Millar produced track can't fail." Steve Thomson of the Reading Evening Post noted that "as a dance track this is a belter". Vincent O'Keeffe of The Kerryman anticipated the song would be Black's third hit. He wrote, "Black is no overnight success and, with personal problems, he has made it the hard way. Listen to the message and Black can breathe easy just for now at least."

Robert Smith, as guest reviewer for Smash Hits, stated, "This reminds me of a badly produced Billy Mackenzie or Hall & Oates record. But having said that I like the brass in it and the sound of it." As a guest reviewer for Record Mirror, Steve Mack of That Petrol Emotion described the song as "wistful, English and wimpy" and drew comparisons to the Associates. He commented, "He can't really sing, his falsetto is really false and it's not a very good song."

== Formats ==
7-inch single
No.	Title	Length
1.	"I'm Not Afraid"	3:57
2.	"Have It Your Own Way"	3:12

12-inch single
No.	Title	Length
1.	"I'm Not Afraid"	5:48
2.	"Have It Your Own Way"	3:12
3.	"My Lover"	4:06

== Personnel ==
Credits are adapted from the UK 12-inch single liner notes and the Wonderful Life CD booklet.

Production

- Robin Millar – producer ("I'm Not Afraid")
- Dave Dix – producer ("Have It Your Own Way", "My Lover"), mixing ("I'm Not Afraid")
- Dave Anderson – mixing ("I'm Not Afraid")
- Pete Brown – engineer ("I'm Not Afraid")

Other

- Perry Ogden – photography
- John Warwicker – art direction, design
- Jeremy Pearce – design

== Charts ==
Chart (1987)	Peak position
UK Singles (OCC)	78
