= Now You're Gone (Black song) =

Single by Black

from the album Comedy
- Released: 26 December 1988
- Length: 3:41
- Label: A&M
- Songwriter(s): Black
- Producer(s): Dave Dix

Black singles chronology
"You're a Big Girl Now" (1988)	"Now You're Gone" (1988)	"I Can Laugh About It Now" (1989)

Official audio
- "Now You're Gone" on YouTube

"Now You're Gone" is a song by English singer-songwriter Black, which was released by A&M in 1988 as the third single from his second studio album Comedy. The song was written by Black and produced by Dave "Dix" Dickie. "Now You're Gone" reached number 66 in the UK Singles Chart and remained in the top 100 for four weeks.

== Critical reception ==
On its release as a single, Andy Strickland of Record Mirror described "Now You're Gone" as "a haunting little tale of lost love". He added, "Black backs his deadpan voice with piano and a distinctly classical string quartet that makes 'Now You're Gone' perhaps a better record than its constituent parts warrant." Jerry Smith of Music Week praised it as an "excellent single" from "one of the best albums of '88". He added that "atmospheric ballad" is "superbly sung" with "complementary production" by Dix. Andrew Hirst of the Huddersfield Daily Examiner noted the "clever lyrics", Black's "far from jarring crooning" and the "not too unpleasant sound of violinists sawing away in the background", but felt the result was "completely uninspiring". Marcus Hodge of the Cambridge Evening News noted the "classic feel", but added the song "never gets beyond a good idea".

== Formats ==
7-inch single (UK, Europe and Australia)
No.	Title	Notes	Length
1.	"Now You're Gone"		3:41
2.	"Now You're Gone"	Mardi Gras Version	5:27

12-inch single (UK and Germany)
No.	Title	Notes	Length
1.	"Now You're Gone"		3:41
2.	"Now You're Gone"	Mardi Gras Version	5:27
3.	"Brother O' Mine"		3:16

CD single (UK and Europe)
No.	Title	Notes	Length
1.	"Now You're Gone"		3:41
2.	"Now You're Gone"	Mardi Gras Version	5:25
3.	"Brother O' Mine"		3:16

== Personnel ==
Credits are adapted from the UK CD single liner notes and the Comedy CD album booklet.

"Now You're Gone"

- Black – lead vocals
- Dave Dix – keyboards, vibes, programming
- Derek Green – backing vocals

Production

- Dave Dix – producer ("Now You're Gone")
- Dave Anderson – engineer (all tracks)
- Mike Pela – mixing engineer ("Now You're Gone")
- Colin Black – producer ("Now You're Gone" – Mardi Gras Version, "Brother O' Mine")

Other

- John Warwicker/Vivid I.D., Jeremy Pearce – art direction, design, incidental photography
- Perry Ogden – photography

== Charts ==
Chart (1989)	Peak position
UK Singles (OCC)	66
