= Here It Comes Again (Black song) =

Single by Black

from the album Black
- B-side: "Every Waking Hour"
- Released: 1991
- Length: 4:22 (album version); 3:58 (single version)
- Label: A&M
- Songwriter(s): Black
- Producer(s): Robin Millar

Black singles chronology
"Feel Like Change" (1991)	"Here It Comes Again" (1991)	"Fly Up to the Moon" (1991)

Official audio
- "Here It Comes Again" on YouTube

"Here It Comes Again" is a song by English singer-songwriter Black, which was released by A&M in 1991 as the second single from his third studio album, Black (1991). The song was written by Black and produced by Robin Millar. "Here It Comes Again" reached number 70 in the UK Singles Chart.

== Background ==
"Here It Comes Again" was released as the second single from the 1991 album Black. Initially there were disagreements between Black and A&M Records over which song from Black would be the first single. The label wanted to release "Here It Comes Again" but Black favoured "Feel Like Change". "Here It Comes Again" reached number 70 in the UK Singles Chart in June 1991. It was Black's last appearance in the chart.

In 1991, Black described "Here It Comes Again" as "a song about inevitability". He added, "It seems to me that we live in cycles. If you look hard enough, you constantly see the repetitions in the shape and the form of everything, and sometimes it's difficult to attribute to coincidence."

== Critical reception ==
On its release, Sylvia Patterson of Smash Hits felt "Here It Comes Again" was "unsurpassably dull" and added, "Colin dribbles on in his familiar 'women, they stole my soul and now I'm a dried-out kipper-fin' demented torpor." Andrew Hirst of the Huddersfield Daily Examiner described it as an "ever-so-gentle musical daydream" which is "neatly rounded off with a deft saxophone solo". In a review of Black, Peter Kinghorn of the Evening Chronicle considered the song "outstanding". In a retrospective review, Michael Sutton of AllMusic described it as one of a number of tracks which "unfold with a snail's velocity; nevertheless, they are beautifully sung and stylishly composed".

== Formats ==
7-inch and cassette single
No.	Title	Length
1.	"Here It Comes Again"	3:54
2.	"Every Waking Hour"	3:27

12-inch and CD single
No.	Title	Notes	Length
1.	"Here It Comes Again"		3:58
2.	"Every Waking Hour"		3:27
3.	"Shades"		4:32
4.	"Wonderful Life"	Christmas '88 Recording	5:03

CD promotional single (US)
No.	Title	Notes	Length
1.	"Here It Comes Again"	Radio Version	3:57
2.	"Every Waking Hour"	CD Version	4:23

== Personnel ==
Credits are adapted from the UK CD single liner notes and the Black CD booklet.

Here It Comes Again

- Black – vocals, strings
- Pete Davis – keyboards, programming
- Martin Green – soprano saxophone
- Gordon Morgan – guitar
- Brad Lang – bass
- Roy Martin – drums

Production

- Robin Millar – producer and arranger (all tracks)
- Jim Abbiss – recording and mixing ("Here It Comes Again")

Other

- John Warwicker – art direction, design, photography
- Graham Wood – typography, drawing
- Tom Gidley – incidental photography

== Charts ==
Chart (1991)	Peak position
UK Singles (OCC)	70
