= Killing Time (Tina Cousins album) =

Studio album by Tina Cousins
- Released: 1998
- Genre: Pop
- Label: Big
- Producer: Pete Waterman, Mark Topham, Karl Twigg (co.)

Tina Cousins chronology
Killing Time (1998)	Mastermind (2005)

Singles from Tina Cousins
- 1. "Killin' Time" Released: 9 June 1997; 2. "Angel" Released: 25 August 1997; 3. "Pray" Released: 2 November 1998; 4. "Killin' Time '99" Released: 15 March 1999; 5. "Forever" Released: 28 June 1999; 6. "Angel" Released: 27 September 1999

Professional ratings
Review scores
Source	Rating
AllMusic	3/5 stars
Dayton Daily News	(favorable)

Killing Time is the first album by the British singer Tina Cousins. Originally released in 1998 and later released her home market of the United Kingdom on 12 July 1999, it was produced by Pete Waterman with co-production by Mark Topham and Karl Twigg.

The album contained the song "Pray", which was released in the United States soon after its rapid success in both the United Kingdom and Australia. However, the single did not make an impact on American radio until late 2006, when it was added to the music databases of a few rhythmic/dance format stations. The album also contained the singles "Killin' Time", "Forever", "Angel" and "Nothing to Fear" which, like "Pray", only became popular in the US in 2005 and 2006, after their release.

== Track listing ==
1. "Killin' Time"
2. "Pray"
3. "Angel"
4. "Live and Breathe"
5. "Forever"
6. "Breathless"
7. "Nothing to Fear"
8. "Turn Back Time"
9. "The Fool Is Me"
10. "Until the Day"
11. "Mysterious Times"
12. "Killin' Time (Under Influence Mix)" – tour edition bonus track
13. "Forever (W.I.P. Manana Mix)" – tour edition bonus track
14. "Pray (W.I.P. in the Church Mix)" – tour edition bonus track
15. "Angel (W.I.P. Mix)" – tour edition bonus track
16. "Killin' Time (Nelson's Filthy Dub)" – tour edition bonus track

== Charts ==
Chart (2000)	Peak position
Australian Albums Chart	23
Dutch Albums Chart	69
Finland Albums Chart	11
Sweden Albums Chart	41
UK Albums Chart	50
