= Thank ABBA for the Music =

1999 single by Steps, Tina Cousins, Cleopatra, B*Witched and Billie

Single by Steps, Tina Cousins, Cleopatra, B*Witched and Billie

from the album ABBAmania
- Released: 29 March 1999
- Length: 4:07
- Label: Epic
- Songwriters: Benny Andersson; Björn Ulvaeus; Stig Anderson
- Producer: Work in Progress

Steps singles chronology
"Better Best Forgotten" (1999)	"Thank ABBA for the Music" (1999)	"Love's Got a Hold on My Heart" (1999)

Tina Cousins singles chronology
"Killin' Time '99" (1999)	"Thank ABBA for the Music" (1999)	"Forever" (1999)

Cleopatra singles chronology
"A Touch of Love" (1999)	"Thank ABBA for the Music" (1999)	"Come and Get Me" (2000)

B*Witched singles chronology
"Blame It on the Weatherman" (1999)	"Thank ABBA for the Music" (1999)	"Jesse Hold On" (1999)

Billie singles chronology
"Honey to the Bee" (1999)	"Thank ABBA for the Music" (1999)	"Day & Night" (2000)

"Thank ABBA for the Music" is a medley of songs originally released by the pop group ABBA, performed by Steps, Tina Cousins, Cleopatra, B*Witched and Billie. The medley consists of "Take a Chance on Me", "Dancing Queen", "Mamma Mia", and "Thank You for the Music". It was originally performed during the 1999 Brit Awards, which occurred on 16 February, and its release coincided with the debut of the ABBA musical Mamma Mia!. The medley peaked at number four on the UK Singles Chart in April 1999 and reached the top 10 in Australia, Ireland, New Zealand, and Sweden.

== Track listings ==
UK and Australian CD single
No.	Title	Writer(s)	Length
1.	"Thank ABBA for the Music" (radio edit)	Benny Andersson; Björn Ulvaeus; Stig Anderson	4:07
2.	"Thank ABBA for the Music" (TTW 12-inch remix)	B. Andersson; Ulvaeus; S. Anderson	6:29
3.	"Thank ABBA for the Music" (karaoke)	B. Andersson; Ulvaeus; S. Anderson	4:10

UK cassette single
No.	Title	Writer(s)	Length
1.	"Thank ABBA for the Music" (radio edit)	B. Andersson; Ulvaeus; S. Anderson	4:07
2.	"Thank ABBA for the Music" (karaoke)	B. Andersson; Ulvaeus; S. Anderson	4:10

European CD single
No.	Title	Writer(s)	Length
1.	"Thank ABBA for the Music" (radio edit)	B. Andersson; Ulvaeus; S. Anderson	4:07
2.	"Thank ABBA for the Music" (TTW 12-inch remix)	B. Andersson; Ulvaeus; S. Anderson	6:29

== Personnel ==
- Tina Cousins – lead and backing vocals
- Billie Piper – lead and backing vocals

=== Cleopatra ===
- Cleo Higgins – lead vocals
- Yonah Higgins – backing vocals
- Zainam Higgins – backing vocals

=== B*Witched ===
- Lindsay Armaou – backing vocals
- Edele Lynch – lead vocals
- Keavy Lynch – backing vocals
- Sinead O'Carroll – backing vocals

=== Steps ===
- Lee Latchford-Evans – lead and backing vocals
- Claire Richards – lead and backing vocals
- Lisa Scott-Lee – lead and backing vocals
- Faye Tozer – lead and backing vocals
- Ian "H" Watkins – lead and backing vocals

== Charts ==
=== Weekly charts ===
Chart (1999)	Peak position
Australia (ARIA)	9
Belgium (Ultratop 50 Flanders)	23
Belgium (Ultratop 50 Wallonia)	23
Europe (Eurochart Hot 100)	14
Germany (GfK)	97
Iceland (Íslenski Listinn Topp 40)	16
Ireland (IRMA)	5
Netherlands (Dutch Top 40)	14
Netherlands (Single Top 100)	14
New Zealand (Recorded Music NZ)	6
Scotland Singles (OCC)	2
Sweden (Sverigetopplistan)	8
UK Singles (OCC)	4
UK Airplay (Music Week)	32

=== Year-end charts ===
Chart (1999)	Position
Australia (ARIA)	40
Belgium (Ultratop 50 Wallonia)	85
Netherlands (Dutch Top 40)	72
Netherlands (Single Top 100)	58
Sweden (Hitlistan)	55
UK Singles (OCC)	52

== Certifications ==
Region	Certification	Certified units/sales
Australia (ARIA)	Platinum	70,000^{^}
New Zealand (RMNZ)	Gold	5,000^{*}
Sweden (GLF)	Gold	15,000^{^}
United Kingdom (BPI)	Silver	200,000^{^}
^{*} Sales figures based on certification alone.^{^} Shipments figures based on certification alone.
