= Comedy (Black album) =

Studio album by Black
- Released: 17 October 1988
- Genre: Pop
- Label: A&M
- Producer: Dave Dix; Robin Millar

Black chronology
Black (1987)	Comedy (1988)	Black (1991)

Professional ratings
Review scores
Source	Rating
AllMusic	3/5 stars

Comedy is the second official album by English singer Black, released in 1988. It reached No.32 in the UK Albums Chart.

== Track listing ==
All tracks are written by Colin Vearncombe.

No.	Title	Length
1.	"The Big One"	3:52
2.	"I Can Laugh About It Now"	5:00
3.	"Whatever People Say You Are"	3:59
4.	"You're a Big Girl Now"	4:19
5.	"Let Me Watch You Make Love"	3:10
6.	"Hey, I Was Right, You Were Wrong!"	3:39
7.	"All We Need Is the Money"	4:30
8.	"You Don't Always Do What's Best for You"	4:44
9.	"Now You're Gone"	3:44
10.	"No-One, None, Nothing"	5:08
11.	"It's Not Over Yet"	5:18
12.	"Paradise Lost"	5:35

== Personnel ==
- Black – guitar, vocals
- Gordon Morgan, Robin Millar – guitar
- Steve Pearce – bass guitar
- Dave Dix – keyboards and programming
- Peter Adams – keyboards
- Guy Richman – drums
- Gavin Harrison – drums on "The Big One" and "It's Not Over Yet".
- Martin Ditcham – percussion
- Martin Green – saxophone
- Steve Sidwell – trumpet
- Sara Lamarra, Tina Labrinski, Derek Green – backing vocals
- Simeon Jones – harmonica on "Let Me Watch You Make Love"

Technical

- Dave Anderson – recording engineer
- Mike Pela – mixing engineer
- Perry Ogden – photography

== Charts ==
Chart performance for Comedy
Chart (1988)	Peak position
Australian Albums (ARIA)	71
German Albums (Offizielle Top 100)	38
Spanish Albums (PROMUSICAE)	10
Swedish Albums (Sverigetopplistan)	37
Swiss Albums (Schweizer Hitparade)	24
UK Albums (OCC)	32

== Certifications ==
Certifications for Comedy
Region	Certification	Certified units/sales
Spain (PROMUSICAE)	Platinum	100,000^{^}
United Kingdom (BPI)	Silver	60,000^{^}
^{^} Shipments figures based on certification alone.
