= The Big One (Black song) =

Single by Black

from the album Comedy
- B-side: "You Are the One"
- Released: 12 September 1988
- Length: 3:52
- Label: A&M
- Songwriter: Black
- Producer: Dave Dix

Black singles chronology
"Paradise" (1988)	"The Big One" (1988)	"You're a Big Girl Now" (1988)

Official audio
- "The Big One" on YouTube

"The Big One" is a song by English singer-songwriter Black, which was released by A&M in 1988 as the lead single from his second studio album Comedy. The song was written by Black and produced by Dave "Dix" Dickie. "The Big One" reached number 54 in the UK Singles Chart and remained in the top 100 for four weeks.

== Background ==
"The Big One" was inspired by the breakdown of Vearncombe's first marriage and subsequent divorce. Speaking of the song's writing and recording, Black told Music & Media in 1988:

The song just sort of fell out. It all happened at the same time; the melody, lyrics, the arrangement – another five-minute wonder. I demoed it, the record company said great, the producer loved it, we went in and did it and I was very pleased with the way it came out. It's the best vocals I think I've ever done; well, perhaps not the best, but the most appropriate. It has the most character, it speaks volumes with very few words and, as usual, it's because I meant every word.

== Critical reception ==
On its release, David Giles of Record Mirror wrote, "While not quite in the same class as the sublime 'Paradise', Col's newie ought to sell enough to keep him in black bedspreads for a few more months." He also praised the B-side, "You Are the One", for being "a rousing ballad full of drama". Marcus Alton of the Newark Advertiser stated, "Vearncombe croons back into our hearts after about a year away from Hitsville. Seems he's been staying in Soul City." Bob Eborall of the Ealing Leader described "The Big One" as being "pleasantly warm and relaxed for the autumn air".

== Formats ==
7-inch single
No.	Title	Length
1.	"The Big One"	3:52
2.	"You Are the One"	3:52

12-inch single
No.	Title	Notes	Length
1.	"The Big One"	The Bigger One	4:38
2.	"You Are the One"		3:52
3.	"The Big One"		3:52
4.	"Scrapbook of Ghosts"		4:03

CD single
No.	Title	Notes	Length
1.	"The Big One"		3:52
2.	"You Are the One"		3:52
3.	"Scrapbook of Ghosts"		4:03
4.	"The Big One"	The Bigger One	4:38

CD single (Japan)
No.	Title	Length
1.	"The Big One"	3:52
2.	"You Are the One"	3:52

== Personnel ==
Credits are adapted from the UK CD single liner notes and the Comedy CD album booklet.

The Big One

- Black – lead vocals, guitar
- Dave Dix – keyboards
- Martin Green – saxophone
- Steve Pearce – bass
- Gavin Harrison – drums
- Martin Ditcham – percussion
- Derek Green – backing vocals

Production

- Dave Dix – producer (all tracks)
- Dave Anderson – engineer ("The Big One")
- Mike Pela – mixing engineer ("The Big One")

== Charts ==
=== Weekly charts ===
Chart (1988–89)	Peak position
Australia (ARIA)	123
Finland (Suomen virallinen lista)	26
Italy (Musica e dischi)	17
Italy Airplay (Music & Media)	1
UK Singles (OCC)	54
West Germany (GfK)	43
