= Feel Like Change =

Single by Black

from the album Black
- B-side: "Nice"
- Released: 1991
- Length: 4:33
- Label: A&M
- Songwriter: Black
- Producer: Robin Millar

Black singles chronology
"Now You're Gone" (1989)	"Feel Like Change" (1991)	"Here It Comes Again" (1991)

Official audio
- "Feel Like Change" on YouTube

"Feel Like Change" is a song by English singer-songwriter Black, which was released by A&M in 1991 as the lead single from his third studio album Black. The song was written by Black and produced by Robin Millar. "Feel Like Change" reached number 56 in the UK Singles Chart and remained in the top 100 for two weeks.

== Background ==
"Feel Like Change" was released as the first single from the 1991 album Black. Initially there were disagreements between Black and A&M Records over which song from Black would be the first single. The label wanted to release "Here It Comes Again" but Black favoured "Feel Like Change". As a single, "Feel Like Change" reached number 56 in the UK Singles Chart in May 1991. It also reached number 38 on the Music Week Playlist Chart.

In 1991, Black described "Feel Like Change" as a "protest song". He added that the song, which shares a similar theme to other tracks on the album, is written from the perspective of feeling sick of things and attempting to outline why.

== Music video ==
The song's music video was shot on location in New York.

== Critical reception ==
On its release, Alan Jones of Music Week described "Feel Like Change" as "pleasingly downtempo". He wrote, "One of Black's most poignant and sharply observed vignettes, it deserves to be a monster, but it [is] so subtle it will need repeated airplay." Clint Boon and Martyn Walsh of Inspiral Carpets reviewed the single as guest reviewers for New Musical Express. Boon stated, "I like it. It's my kind of number. Nice and slow and stylish. This is the kind of record I could end up taking home [and] the kind of song I'd like to write." Walsh, in response to Boon, commented, "You're welcome to it. It sounds like Michael Bolton or Richard Clayderman to me.

In a review of Black, Penny Kiley of the Liverpool Echo considered the song to be the one "closest to his old style". In a retrospective review, Michael Sutton of AllMusic described it as one of a number of tracks which are "beautifully sung and stylishly composed".

== Formats ==
7-inch and cassette single
No.	Title	Length
1.	"Feel Like Change"	4:33
2.	"Nice"	4:27

12-inch and CD single
No.	Title	Length
1.	"Feel Like Change"	4:38
2.	"Nice"	4:29
3.	"I Can Let Go Now"	4:04
4.	"Wonderful Life"	4:48

CD single (Japan)
No.	Title	Length
1.	"Feel Like Change"	4:37
2.	"Here It Comes Again"	4:20

== Personnel ==
Credits are adapted from the UK CD single liner notes and the Black CD booklet.

Feel Like Change

- Black – vocals
- Pete Davis – keyboards, programming
- Martin Green – clarinet, electric guitar
- Gordon Morgan – acoustic guitar, electric guitar, backing vocals
- Brad Lang – bass
- Roy Martin – drums
- Luís Jardim – percussion
- Camilla Griehsel-Vearncombe – vocals, backing vocals

Production

- Robin Millar – producer and arranger ("Feel Like Change", "Nice", "I Can Let Go Now" and "Here It Comes Again")
- Dave Dix – producer ("Wonderful Life")

Other

- John Warwicker – art direction, design, photography
- Graham Wood – typography, drawing
- Tom Gidley – incidental photography

== Charts ==
Chart (1991)	Peak position
Germany (GfK)	72
UK Singles (OCC)	56
UK Airplay (Music Week)	38
