= Sweetest Smile =

1987 single by Black

Single by Black

from the album Wonderful Life
- B-side: "Sixteens"
- Released: 19 June 1987
- Genre: Sophisti-pop; pop rock
- Length: 4:22 (7" version); 5:21 (12" and album version)
- Label: A&M
- Songwriter(s): Colin Vearncombe
- Producer(s): Dave "Dix" Dickie

Black singles chronology
| "Everything's Coming Up Roses" (1987) | "Sweetest Smile" (1987) | "Wonderful Life" (1987) |

Music video
- Black - Sweetest Smile (Official Video) on YouTube

"Sweetest Smile" is a song by English singer Black, released in June 1987 as the third single from his debut album Wonderful Life. It became his first UK top ten hit, peaking at number 8 on the UK Singles Chart. On the back of its success, "Wonderful Life" was re-released, becoming an international hit.

== Meaning and reception ==
Speaking in an interview with Smash Hits in 1987, he said of the song "It's me singing me story of everything that happened to me in 1985, which was a rotten year. Basically my heart was broken. I was… erm, I'm technically married. Er… I've got an imminent divorce – I've been separated for two years. Er… I've never told anyone that, I shouldn't have said it! Er… yeah, so that was 1985, along with lots of other things, me family falling ill and me friends going through all sorts of stuff… I'm alright now though. Just about."

The song was reviewed in Record Mirror and was described as "a beautiful, slow croon. Sufficiently different from the usual conveyor-belt of identikit hits to distract the listener and stretch their attention span to four minutes."

== Track listings ==
7"

1. "Sweetest Smile" – 4:22
2. "Sixteens" – 3:56

12" / CD / cassette

1. "Sweetest Smile" – 5:21
2. "Sixteens" – 3:56
3. "Leave Yourself Alone" – 4:32
4. "Hardly Star-Crossed Lovers" – 2:51

== Personnel ==
Musicians

- Colin Vearncombe – vocals
- Dave "Dix" Dickie – keyboards
- Roy Corkill – fretless bass
- Jimmy Hughes – drums
- Martin Green – soprano saxophone

Technical

- John Warwicker – art direction, design
- Jeremy Pearce – design
- Perry Ogden – photography

== Charts ==
| Chart (1987) | Peak position |
|---|---|
| Australia (Kent Music Report) | 87 |
| Europe (European Hot 100 Singles) | 41 |
| France (SNEP) | 38 |
| Ireland (IRMA) | 8 |
| Netherlands (Single Top 100) | 40 |
| New Zealand (Recorded Music NZ) | 41 |
| Spain (AFYVE | 29 |
| UK Singles (OCC) | 8 |
