= Black (1987 singer Black album) =

Compilation album by Black
- Released: 23 November 1987
- Genre: Pop
- Label: Warner Music Group
- Producer: Black; David Motion on "More Than The Sun", Peter Walsh on "I Could Kill You"

Black chronology
Wonderful Life (1987)	Black (1987)	Comedy (1988)

Professional ratings
Review scores
Source	Rating
New Musical Express	8/10
Record Mirror	4/5 stars

Black is a self-titled album by Black, the musical vehicle of Colin Vearncombe. It is a retrospective album released in 1987 by Black's former label Warner Music Group after his commercial breakthrough with the album Wonderful Life (on A&M Records) and comprises several singles recorded while Vearncombe was signed to Warner.

== Track listing ==
Side One

1. "Hey Presto"
2. "Stephen"
3. "Liquid Dream"
4. "More Than The Sun"

Side Two

1. "Widemouth" *
2. "I Could Kill You"
3. "Butterfly Man"

Catalog# : WX 137

- All songs written by Colin Vearncombe and David (Dickie) Dix.
- All tracks (P)1984 Warner Music Group except *(P)1987 Warner Music Group (C)1987 Warner Music Group

This vinyl album has never been re-released in CD format.
