= Tina Cousins =

English singer-songwriter and model (born 1971)

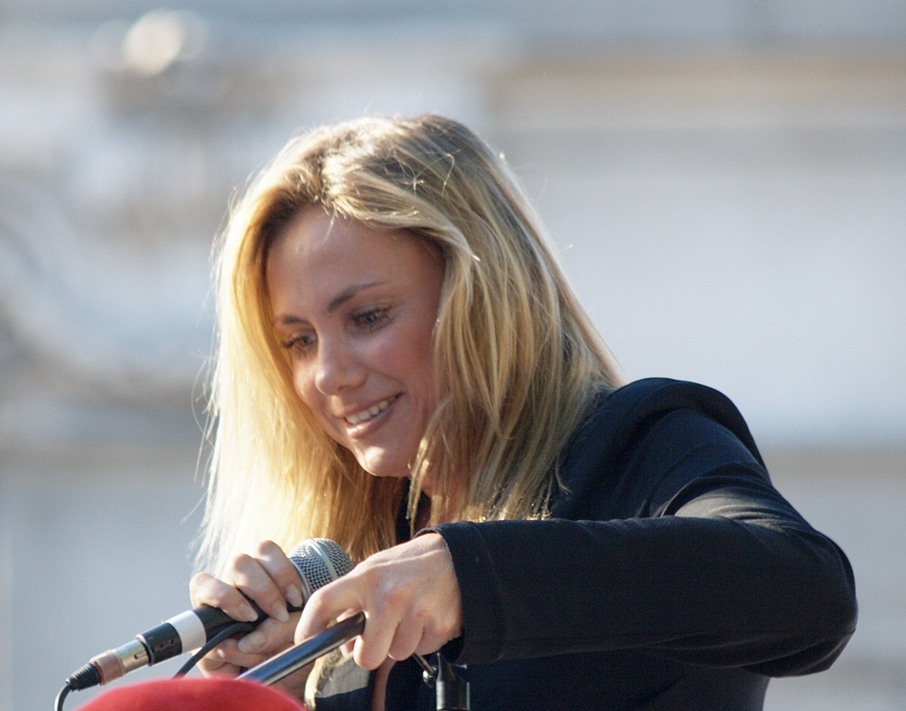
- Cousins in Madrid, Spain in July 2008

Background information
- Born: Tina Patricia Cousins; 20 April 1971 (age 55)
- Origin: Leigh-on-Sea, Essex, England
- Genres: Electronic, dance-pop, hi-NRG, Eurodance, vocal trance
- Occupations: Singer, songwriter, model
- Years active: 1996–present
- Labels: All Around the World (UK) (1998–2006); Big (Australia) (1998–present); Republic (US) (1998–2002); Sony Music (International) (2010–present)
- Website: tinacousins.com

Tina Patricia Cousins (born 20 April 1971) is an English singer, songwriter and former model. She has had five singles in the top 20 of the UK Singles Chart, both as a solo artist and in collaboration with others, including "Mysterious Times" with Sash!, which reached number 2 in the UK in 1998. She has also achieved popularity in several other countries, including four top 30 hits in Sweden, six top 30 hits in Australia and seven top 20 hits in Finland. Her other hit singles include "Pray" (1998), "Killin' Time" (1999), "Forever" (1999), "Just Around the Hill" with Sash! (2000) and "Wonderful Life" (2005).

== Career ==
=== 1998–2000: early career and "Mysterious Times" ===
Cousins' first big break was in the music industry, appearing on German DJ/producer team Sash!'s single "Mysterious Times" in 1998. Before "Mysterious Times", Cousins had released "Killin' Time" and "Angel" in March and June 1997, respectively.

Following the success of "Mysterious Times", she had two further UK top 20 hits with the follow-up "Pray", released in November 1998, which also achieved success in the U.S., and the 1999 re-release of "Killin' Time". Follow-up singles "Forever" and the reissued "Angel" reached the UK top 50 (though a published recount of the singles chart showed that "Forever" actually reached #38 rather than the previously published #45). Cousins turned her attention to Australia where the song, "Forever" achieved gold sales. "Pray" was also a success in Australia, reaching the top 10 and becoming her second gold single in the ARIA Charts where it remained for more than four months.

Whilst in Australia on a promotional tour, she re-recorded her track "Nothing to Fear" and had it remixed by the Groove Peddlers. This became her third Australian single, and the video was also shot there.

Cousins joined Billie Piper, Cleopatra, B*Witched and Steps on the track "Thank ABBA for the Music", a medley of ABBA hits that they performed as a tribute at the Brit Awards. The single was released and reached the top 10 in the UK, Republic of Ireland, Sweden, Australia and New Zealand. In 2000, she again collaborated with Sash!, on the UK top 10 hit "Just Around the Hill".

=== 2005–2008 ===
In 2005, Cousins released her first single in five years with "Wonderful Life", a cover of the Black song, which had originally been released in Australia. In 2007, "Wonderful Life" was adopted by Hoyts as their primary pre-feature theme music. "Wonderful Life" reached No. 15 in Australia and spent four months in the Top 50, becoming her biggest radio hit.

The follow-up single was "Come to Me". Both singles were taken from her second album Mastermind, which reached the UK and Australian Top 50. The third single to be taken from the album, "Pretty Young Thing", was released in two CD formats, one of which was limited to 1,000 pressings. The single reached the Australian Top 30.

Cousins made a guest appearance on Never Mind the Buzzcocks, a UK television comedy panel show, which was broadcast on 2 November 2006, in the game's Identity Parade.

In late 2006, dance format radio station WMPH became the first US station to put any of Cousins's singles in regular rotation. In 2007, she co-wrote and performed vocals on two songs on the Main Line album by Dutch group 4 Strings. The track "Curious" became a Top 30 Hot Dance Airplay hit.

=== 2009–present ===
On 7 March 2009, Cousins announced on her website that a new track had been recorded along with a film clip for a new single called "Can't Hold Back". This song is with Bellatrax and was released in the U.S. and the UK on Michael Gray's Eye Industries label in late summer 2009. In April 2009, Cousins announced that she had recorded a cover version of "Sex on Fire", originally by the Kings of Leon. The track was produced by Topham & Twigg and was released on iTunes UK on 2 September. She signed a worldwide deal with Sony Music International in September 2010, and "Sex on Fire" was released worldwide in autumn 2010.

The video for "Sex on Fire" was leaked to YouTube in October 2010. The video is most notable for its explicit scenes. The pop music blog, Popjustice, described it as "another exercise in awful and amazing".

From 2010 Tina also released new music with the singles "Everlong", " Love Comes Back", "Diamonds" and "When Tomorrow Comes".

In 2014 she also recorded and released a new track "Screams" with Kalsi and Applejack. In 2015 she also recorded a new track "Bullet in the Gun"— a remake of Planet Perfecto's late-1990s dance hit—with Probaker and Kalsi.

In November 2016, she toured Australia with the Vengaboys, Sonique, Whigfield and Joanne Accom.

== Discography ==
Tina Cousins discography
- Studio albums: 2
- Singles: 19

=== Studio albums ===
Title	Album details	Peak chart positions						Certifications
Title	Album details	UK	AUS	FIN	NED	SCO	SWE	Certifications
Killing Time	Released: July 1999; Label: Big Records	50	23	11	69	56	41	AUS: Gold; FIN: Gold
Mastermind	Released: September 2005; Label: Big Records	—	48	—	—	—	—	
"—" denotes items that did not chart or were not released in that territory.

=== EPs ===
Title	Year	AUS
The Remix EP	2000	81

=== Singles ===
Year	Title	Peak chart positions										Certifications	Album
Year	Title	UK	AUS	BEL	FIN	FRA	IRE	NED	NZ	SPA	SWE	Certifications	Album
1997	"Killin' Time"	80	—	—	16	—	—	23	—	—	—		Killing Time
1997	"Angel"	—	—	—	—	—	—	—	—	—	—		Killing Time
1998	"Mysterious Times" (with Sash!)	2	62	13	8	16	11	17	28	—	17	UK: Silver; BEL: Gold; FRA: Silver	Life Goes On (Sash! album)
1998	"Pray"	20	8	12	10	59	—	34	48	—	23	AUS: Gold	Killing Time
1999	"Killin' Time" (re-release)	15	—	30	—	—	—	—	—	—	—		Killing Time
1999	"Thank ABBA for the Music" (with Steps, Cleopatra, B*Witched and Billie)	4	9	23	—	—	5	14	6	—	8	UK: Silver; AUS: Platinum; NZ: Gold	ABBAmania (ABBA tribute album)
1999	"Forever"	38	14	—	—	—	—	—	—	—	47	AUS: Gold	Killing Time
1999	"Angel (re-release)"	46	—	—	—	—	—	—	—	—	—		Killing Time
2000	"Just Around the Hill" (with Sash!)	8	26	37	16	55	30	60	—	—	30		Trilenium (Sash! album)
2000	"Nothing to Fear"	—	66	—	—	—	—	—	—	—	—		Killing Time
2005	"Hymn"	—	—	—	—	—	—	—	—	—	—		Mastermind
2005	"Wonderful Life"	58	17	—	17	—	—	—	—	—	—		Mastermind
2005	"Come to Me"	—	58	—	14	—	—	—	—	—	—		Mastermind
2006	"Pretty Young Thing"/ "All You Need Is Love"	—	27	—	9	—	—	—	—	—	—		Mastermind
2007	"Curious" (with 4 Strings)	—	—	—	—	—	—	—	—	—	—		Mainline (4 Strings album)
2009	"Hymn" (with Resource)	—	—	—	—	—	—	—	—	45	—		Non-album singles
2009	"Can't Hold Back (with Bellatrax)"	—	—	—	—	—	—	88	—	—	—		Non-album singles
2010	"Sex on Fire"	—	—	—	—	—	—	—	—	—	—		Non-album singles
2012	"When Tomorrow Comes"	—	—	—	—	—	—	—	—	—	—		Non-album singles
"—" denotes items that did not chart or were not released in that territory.
