= Between Two Churches =

Studio album by Black
- Released: 7 November 2005 (UK)
- Length: 48:59
- Label: Nero Schwarz (UK); KUFALA Recordings (US)
- Producer: Calum MacColl

Black chronology
Smoke Up Close (2002)	Between Two Churches (2005)	The Given (2009)

Between Two Churches is the ninth studio album by English singer-songwriter Black, which was released by Nero Schwarz in 2005.

== Background ==
Between Two Churches was Colin Vearncombe's ninth overall studio album, but the sixth under his stage name Black, which he last used on the 1993 Are We Having Fun Yet? album. After releasing three studio albums, three live albums and touring under his own name, Vearncombe released Between Two Churches under the Black name in 2005. Black commented on his official website, "The ambiguity of the name Black gives me valuable freedom as a singer/songwriter. This [album] is the one I've been working towards: the best one since the first one."

Prior to the release of the album, Black issued the four-track extended play Two Churches which contains "Two Churches", "Cold Chicken Skin" and "Her Coat No Knickers" from Between Two Churches, as well as the exclusive track "Where the River Bends". As a taster for the forthcoming album, the EP was only available for sale at Black's 2005 concerts. In 2006, Go! Entertainment released "In a Heartbeat" as a promotional single in Benelux.

== Critical reception ==
Professional ratings
Review scores
Source	Rating
AllMusic	4/5 stars
Get Ready to Rock!	4/5 stars

On its release, David Jeffries of AllMusic described Between Two Churches as a "guitar-driven project with Vearncombe sounding rather like an early-'70s Neil Diamond". He commented, "Vearncombe hasn't lost his rich voice or his ability to write meaningful tunes, and he's gained a heck of a lot of warm charm. The highlights are numerous and the album is paced perfectly. Mature, smart, and honest, Between Two Churches is a wonderful surprise." David Randall of Get Ready to Rock! noted the album has the "guitar upfront" and "the sixties as musical inspiration". He considered some tracks to be reminiscent of Richard Thompson and others recalling James Grant. He concluded, "[The album] will appeal to old fans as well as the new. A welcome return and a surefire return-to-form."

Mike Davies of NetRhythms considered the album to show Black returning to a "fuller band sound of yore" in comparison with the "down to basics" approach of the albums released under his own name. Davies noted that "while artistic rather than commercial considerations [are] undoubtedly uppermost, the album also includes his most radio friendly recordings of the past six years." Neil McKay of the Belfast Telegraph described Between Two Churches as a "reminder of what a rounded, diligent craftsman Vearncombe is". He wrote, "Switching moods effortlessly and boasting a decent number of hummable tunes, it really gets interesting on the handful of songs where he reaches deep into previously unchartered [sic] territory and comes on like a cross between Richard Thompson and Nick Cave."

== Track listing ==
All songs written by Colin Vearncombe except where indicated.

UK Nero Schwarz 2005 CD release
No.	Title	Writer(s)	Length
1.	"Come Out of the Rain"		2:57
2.	"Cold Chicken Skin"	Vearncombe, William Topley	3:49
3.	"Charlemagne"		3:51
4.	"Teenage Wall"		4:20
5.	"Same Mistake Twice"	Vearncombe, Topley	3:59
6.	"In a Heartbeat"		3:36
7.	"Two Churches"		5:08
8.	"If You're All Done Dying"		3:40
9.	"Signal Black Spot"		4:21
10.	"Her Coat and No Knickers"		5:51
11.	"Are You Having a Wonderful Life?"		2:35
12.	"History of Rock 'N' Roll Part 1"		4:52

US KUFALA Recordings 2006 CD release
No.	Title	Writer(s)	Length
1.	"If You're All Done Dying"		3:38
2.	"Cold Chicken Skin"	Vearncombe, William Topley	3:49
3.	"Charlemagne"		3:51
4.	"Come Out of the Rain"		2:55
5.	"Teenage Wall"	Vearncombe, Topley	4:20
6.	"In a Heartbeat"		3:34
7.	"Two Churches"		5:05
8.	"The Unforgiven"		5:04
9.	"Her Coat and No Knickers"		5:50
10.	"History of Rock 'N' Roll Part 1"		4:49

== Personnel ==
Credits are adapted from the UK CD album booklet's liner notes.

- Colin Vearncombe – vocals (all tracks), guitar (all tracks), harmonica (track 11)
- Calum MacColl – guitar (all tracks), backing vocals (tracks 2–3, 7–10, 12), flat thing (track 3)
- Barry Van Zyl – drums/percussion (tracks 1–3, 7, 10–11)
- Liam Bradley – drums/percussion (tracks 4–6, 8–9, 12), additional percussion (tracks 3, 7), backing vocals (tracks 6, 9, 12)
- Concord Nkabinde – bass guitar (tracks 1–2, 7, 10–11), backing vocals (tracks 2–3, 10)
- Simon Edwards – bass guitar (tracks 4–6, 8–9, 12), additional bass (track 7), marimbula (track 2)
- James Hallawell – Hammond organ/piano (tracks 4–5, 8–12)

Production

- Calum MacColl – producer
- Neal Snyman – engineer (tracks 1–5, 7, 10–12)
- Paul Madden – engineer (tracks 6, 8–9)
- Phill Brown – mixing
- Denis Blackham – mastering

Other

- John Warwicker – design, photography
- Colin Vearncombe – paintings
