= Here It Comes =

Here It Comes may refer to:

- Here It Comes (Doves EP), and the title song
- Here It Comes (Plug EP), and the title song
- "Here It Comes" (song), a song by Strawbs

== See also ==
- Here It Comes Again (disambiguation)
