= Killing Time (2007 film) =

Killing Time (Temps mort) is a 2007 Canadian documentary film that tells the story of how Bhutan expelled a sixth of its population in 1990. It was produced and directed by Annika Gustafson.

== Awards ==
The film won le Grand Prix at the Montreal Human Rights Film Festival 2008.
