= Black (1991 singer Black album) =

Studio album by Black
- Released: 1991
- Length: 42:40
- Label: A&M
- Producer: Robin Millar

Black chronology
Comedy (1988)	Black (1991)	Are We Having Fun Yet? (1993)

Black is the third studio album by English singer-songwriter Black, which was released by A&M in 1991. The album reached number 42 in the UK Albums Chart.

== Background ==
Following the release of his second album Comedy in 1988, Black spent time writing new material for his third album. After writing approximately 50 songs, he recorded Black in Power Plant Studios and First Protocol in London, with Robin Millar as the producer. Sam Brown provided vocals on the duet "Fly Up to the Moon" and Robert Palmer also made a guest appearance by backing vocals on "Learning How to Hate".

Three singles were released from Black, with two making an appearance in the UK Singles Chart. "Feel Like Change" reached number 56 in May 1991 and "Here It Comes Again" reached number 70 in June 1991. The third and final single, "Fly Up to the Moon", failed to chart.

By the time Black was released, the relationship between the singer and A&M was strained. Personnel changes within A&M resulted in the loss of many of Black's original supporters, including the head of A&R, Chris Briggs. Prior to the album's recording, A&M expressed their dislike over some of Black's new material and later there were disagreements over which song would be the album's first single. The label opted for "Here It Comes Again" but Black wanted "Feel Like Change". After the album's release, A&M did not exercise the option for a fourth album and Black would release future material under his own label, Chaos Reins/Nero Schwarz.

== Critical reception ==
Professional ratings
Review scores
Source	Rating
AllMusic	4/5 stars
New Musical Express	3/10

On its release, Penny Kiley of the Liverpool Echo described Black as "sophisticated" and "well-crafted, song-based pop". She added, "The first single, 'Feels Like Change' is actually the closest to his old style. The rest of the songs are fairly varied with a few surprises." Paul Lester of Melody Maker praised the opening track "Too Many Times" for having "a chorus that could kibosh a coyote" and "a familiar languid cool [which] hasn't been smeared on our ears with such elan" since Sade's "Your Love Is King". He was critical of the rest of the album, adding that he "hesitate[s] in recommending anything else here". Stephen Dalton of New Musical Express felt the album contained "diluted descendants of the smoochy, melancholic, post-modernist ennui which Mr Black captured in 'Wonderful Life' so perfectly that he effectively negated his entire career since 1986". He added, "Po-faced pomposity aside, Verano's tonsils know a croonsome tune when they meet one. Deep and rich and Bowie-esque one minute, smooth and soulful and Astley-fied the next, he papers over mediocre material with all the tasteful emotion he can muster. But mostly it's just dreary."

Billboard praised the album as a "stirring cycle of dark, often cynical songs underscored by brooding melodies". The reviewer described Black as "an odd cross between Leonard Cohen, David Bowie and Chris de Burgh". In a retrospective review, Michael Sutton of AllMusic described Black's vocals as a "deep, plaintive croon" reminiscent of David Freeman and Bryan Ferry. He added, "The mellow, jazzy rhythms on Black befit his voice; Vearncombe's vocals require moody, relaxed arrangements in order to let the emotions calmly pour out." He concluded, "The understated hooks on Black may not be heard on first listen; however, they become loud and clear after repeated spins."

== Track listing ==
All tracks are written by Colin Vearncombe.

No.	Title	Length
1.	"Too Many Times"	5:02
2.	"Feel Like Change"	4:38
3.	"Here It Comes Again"	4:24
4.	"Learning How to Hate"	4:09
5.	"Fly Up to the Moon"	3:07
6.	"Let's Talk About Me"	4:42
7.	"Sweet Breath of Your Rapture"	4:05
8.	"Listen"	3:59
9.	"She's My Best Friend"	4:07
10.	"This Is Life"	4:43

== Personnel ==
Credits are adapted from the CD album booklet's liner notes.

- Black – vocals (tracks 1–10), strings (track 3), acoustic guitar (track 5), guitar (tracks 8–10), keyboards (tracks 8, 10)
- Pete Davis – keyboards (tracks 1–10), programming (tracks 1–10), strings (track 9)
- Martin Green – clarinet (tracks 1–2, 5), tenor saxophone (tracks 1, 4–5), electric guitar (track 2), soprano saxophone (track 3), guitar (track 4), bass clarinet (track 5), brass arrangement (track 5), rhythm guitar (tracks 6, 9), saxophone (tracks 6–7), flute (track 6)
- Gordon Morgan – guitar (tracks 1, 3–4, 7), backing vocals (tracks 1–2), acoustic guitar (track 2), electric guitar (tracks 2, 5), lead guitar (tracks 6, 9), arpeggio guitar (track 10)
- Brad Lang – bass (tracks 1–10)
- Roy Martin – drums (tracks 1–10)
- Camilla Griehsel-Vearncombe – backing vocals (tracks 1–2, 6), vocals (track 2)
- Steve Sidwell – flugelhorn (track 1), trumpet (tracks 4–6)
- Bob Andrews – Hammond organ (tracks 1, 5, 7)
- Luís Jardim – percussion (tracks 2, 4, 6–7)
- Robert Palmer – backing vocals (track 4)
- Rick Taylor – trombone (tracks 4–6)
- Sam Brown – vocals (track 5)

Production

- Robin Millar – producer (all tracks), arranger (all tracks), brass arrangement (tracks 1, 6)
- Jim Abbiss – recording (all tracks), mixing (tracks 1–4, 6–10)
- Dave Anderson – mixing (track 5)
- Guy Fixsen, Katie Dahlstrom, Stan Loubières – assistant engineers

Other

- John Warwicker – art direction, design
- Graham Wood – typographic design

== Charts ==
Chart (1991)	Peak position
UK Albums (OCC)	42
