= Angel (Tina Cousins song) =

1997 single by Tina Cousins

Single by Tina Cousins

from the album Killin' Time
- Released: 25 August 1997
- Length: 3:48 (radio edit)
- Label: Eastern Bloc, Jive
- Songwriters: Mark Topham, Karl Twigg
- Producer: Pete Waterman

Tina Cousins singles chronology
| "Killin' Time" (1997) | "Angel" (1997) | "Mysterious Times" (1998) |
| "Forever" (1999) | "Angel" (1999) | "Just Around the Hill" (2000) |

"Angel" is a song by English singer Tina Cousins. It was released on 25 August 1997 as her second single, then was later re-released on 27 September 1999 as the sixth single from her first album, Killing Time (1999). "Angel" did not chart during its original release but reached number 46 on the UK Singles Chart in October 1999.

== Music video ==
The music video for "Angel" features Cousins in various different settings.

== Track listings ==
1. "Angel" (radio edit) – 3:49
2. "Angel" (Fishead radio edit) – 4:12
3. "Angel" (Mount Rushmore Full Fat Mix) – 8:16
4. "Angel" (Tall Paul Remix) – 7:00
5. "Angel" (Science Fiction Mix) – 8:00
6. "Angel" (Fishead Hells Angel Dub) – 4:46

== Charts ==
| Chart (1999) | Peak position |
|---|---|
| Scotland Singles (OCC) | 28 |
| UK Singles (OCC) | 46 |
| UK Indie (OCC) | 6 |
