= Traveller Wedding =

2009 novel by Graham Jones

Traveller Wedding by Graham Jones
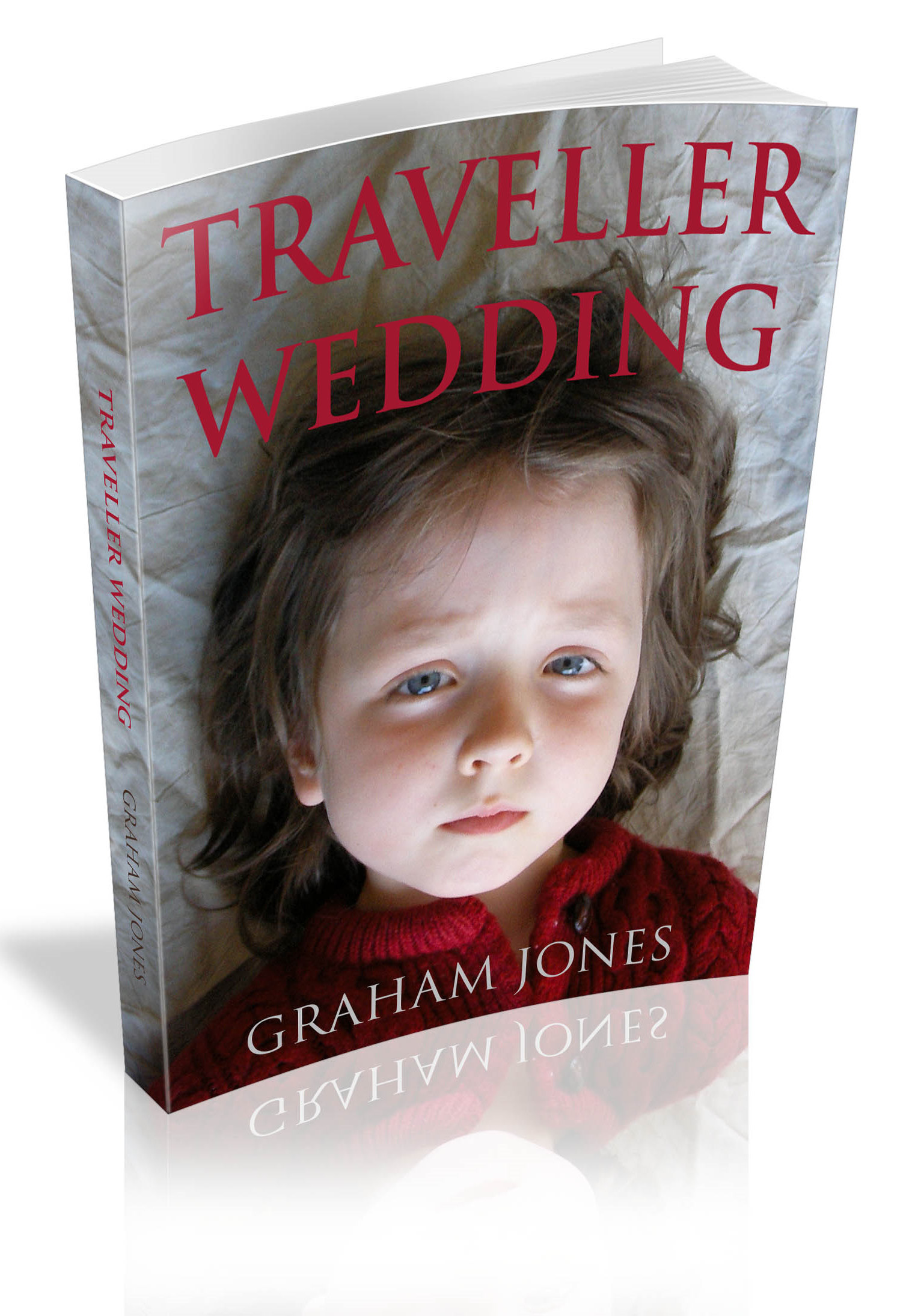
- Author: Graham Jones
- Cover artist: Evelyn Carswell (design)
- Language: English and Italian
- Genre: Novel
- Published: 2009, Gingko Edizioni and others
- Publication place: Ireland
- Media type: Printed Book & eBook
- Pages: varies by format

Traveller Wedding is a 2009 novel by Irish filmmaker Graham Jones. The story is narrated by a nomadic woman called Christine who is furious at the release of a violent videogame about a traveller wedding and determined to tell the story of her people more authentically.
