= Pavee Lackeen =

Pavee Lackeen: The Traveller Girl
- Directed by: Perry Ogden
- Written by: Perry Ogden, Mark Venner
- Starring: Winnie Maughan, Michael Collins
- Distributed by: Pierre Grise Distribution
- Release date: 2005
- Language: English (subtitled due to accent)

Pavee Lackeen: The Traveller Girl is a 2005 Irish slice of life film about an Irish Traveller girl and her family, directed by Perry Ogden. Most of the characters are played by the Maughan family themselves, led by youngest daughter Winnie. At the 2005 IFTA Awards, Ogden won Breakthrough Talent and Maughan was nominated for Best Actress in a Feature Film.

== Reception ==
On the review aggregator website Rotten Tomatoes, 67% of 6 critics' reviews are positive, with an average rating of 5.8/10. Peter Bradshaw, of The Guardian thought that the film was "amiably watchable, despite being almost narrativeless".
