= Wonderful Life (Black album) =

Studio album by Black
- Released: 18 September 1987
- Studios: Powerpoint Studios, London; Square One Studio, Bury
- Genres: Pop rock; new wave
- Length: 44:40
- Label: A&M
- Producers: Dave "Dix" Dickie; Robin Millar ("I'm Not Afraid" only)

Black chronology
Wonderful Life (1987)	Black (1987)

Singles from Wonderful Life
- 1. "Wonderful Life" Released: September 1986; 2. "Everything's Coming Up Roses" Released: April 1987; 3. "Sweetest Smile" Released: June 1987; 4. "I'm Not Afraid" Released: October 1987; 5. "Paradise" Released: January 1988

Audio sample
- "Sweetest Smile": file; help

Professional ratings
Review scores
Source	Rating
AllMusic	4.5/5 stars
Record Mirror	4.5/5 stars
Smash Hits	7 1/2/10

Wonderful Life is the debut album by English singer Black (the stage name of Colin Vearncombe). Released in 1987, it peaked at No. 3 on the UK Albums Chart in September of that year. Three of the songs were co-written with Vearncombe's friend and musical collaborator, keyboardist Dave "Dix" Dickie.

== Background ==
In 1985 Vearncombe wrote the minor key song "Wonderful Life". It was released independently through Ugly Man Records, and got Black noticed by A&M Records who signed Vearncombe and launched his international career. Vearncombe said:

By the end of 1985 I had been in a couple of car crashes, my mother had a serious illness, I had been dropped by a record company, my first marriage went belly-up and I was homeless. Then I sat down and wrote this song called 'Wonderful Life'. I was being sarcastic.

Vearncombe suffered from the feeling of being a one-hit wonder, however, saying later:

Once you have had a hit, it's hard to write another song without having that in the back of your mind. For a long time, I would find myself hearing, 'I like it but it's not Wonderful Life'.

The album's second single "Everything's Coming Up Roses" was also accompanied by a video, but reached only No. 76 in the UK Singles Chart, although also making No. 8 in both the Austrian and German charts. The follow-up "Sweetest Smile", however, became a UK top-10 hit. The third single, a re-release of "Wonderful Life", was a massive hit worldwide. The album of the same name, released in 1987, had similar success, reaping commercial and critical acclaim.

When interviewed in 2013 for superdeluxeedition.com, Vearncome was asked if the album had turned out how he wanted and if the record company had forced producers on him. He replied:

No, we were very, very lucky. You see I’d already been through the mill with Warners and stuff, and then I’d been homeless. There wasn’t much you could scare me with. I was actually homeless when I wrote "Sweetest Smile" and "Wonderful Life," but I was couch-surfing, and nothing touches you when you’re that age. For a while you can get away with it.

Ugly Man Records issue a double-pack single, in September 1986 (Cat. JACK 71D), featuring "Wonderful Life", "Birthday Night", "Sometimes for the Asking" and "Everything's Coming Up Roses".

== Track listing ==
All tracks are written by Colin Vearncombe unless otherwise noted.

Side A
No.	Title	Writer(s)	Length
1.	"Wonderful Life"		4:46
2.	"Everything's Coming Up Roses"		4:04
3.	"Sometimes for the Asking"		4:09
4.	"Finder"		4:12
5.	"Paradise"	Colin Vearncombe, Dave Dickie	4:51

Side B
No.	Title	Writer(s)	Length
6.	"I'm Not Afraid"	Colin Vearncombe, Dave Dickie	5:00
7.	"I Just Grew Tired"		4:15
8.	"Blue"	Colin Vearncombe, Dave Dickie	3:38
9.	"Just Making Memories"		4:26
10.	"Sweetest Smile"		5:19
Total length:			44:40

CD Bonus tracks
No.	Title	Writer(s)	Length
11.	"Ravel in the Rain"	Colin Vearncombe, Dave Dickie	3:47
12.	"Leave Yourself Alone"		4:32
13.	"Sixteens"		3:56
14.	"It's Not You Lady Jane"	Colin Vearncombe, Dave Dickie	3:25
15.	"Hardly Star-Crossed Lovers"		2:51
Total length:			63:11

== Singles ==
The album produced five singles: "Wonderful Life", "I'm Not Afraid" "Everything's Coming Up Roses", "Sweetest Smile" and "Paradise".

== Personnel ==
=== Musicians ===
- Colin Vearncombe – vocals, guitar
- Roy Corkill – fretless bass
- Jimmy Hughes – drums
- Martin Green – saxophone
- Dave "Dix" Dickie – keyboards, programming
- The Creamy Whirls (Tina Labrinski, Sara Lamarra) – backing vocals
- Jimmy Sangster – electric bass
- Doreen Edwards – additional backing vocals
- The Sidwell Brothers – brass section

=== Production ===
- Recorded at Powerplant Studios (London), Square One Studio (Bury).
- Engineered by Stephen Boyce-Buckley, and Pink Studio (Liverpool).

== Charts ==
=== Weekly charts ===
Chart (1987–1988)	Peak position
Australian Albums (ARIA)	34
Austrian Albums (Ö3 Austria)	6
Canada Top Albums/CDs (RPM)	74
Dutch Albums (Album Top 100)	11
French Albums (SNEP)	4
Finnish Albums (Suomen virallinen lista)	31
German Albums (Offizielle Top 100)	9
New Zealand Albums (RMNZ)	21
Swedish Albums (Sverigetopplistan)	30
Swiss Albums (Schweizer Hitparade)	5
UK Albums (Official Charts)	3

=== Year-end charts ===
Chart (1987)	Position
Dutch Albums (Album Top 100)	76
UK Albums (OCC)	63

Chart (1988)	Position
Austrian Albums (Ö3 Austria)	25
German Albums (Offizielle Top 100)	29

== Sales and certifications ==
Certifications for Wonderful Life
Region	Certification	Certified units/sales
France (SNEP)	Gold	100,000^{*}
Germany (BVMI)	Gold	250,000^{^}
Spain (Promusicae)	Platinum	100,000^{^}
Switzerland (IFPI Switzerland)	Gold	25,000^{^}
United Kingdom (BPI)	Platinum	300,000^{^}
^{*} Sales figures based on certification alone.^{^} Shipments figures based on certification alone.
