= Fleury Michon =

French agri-food business

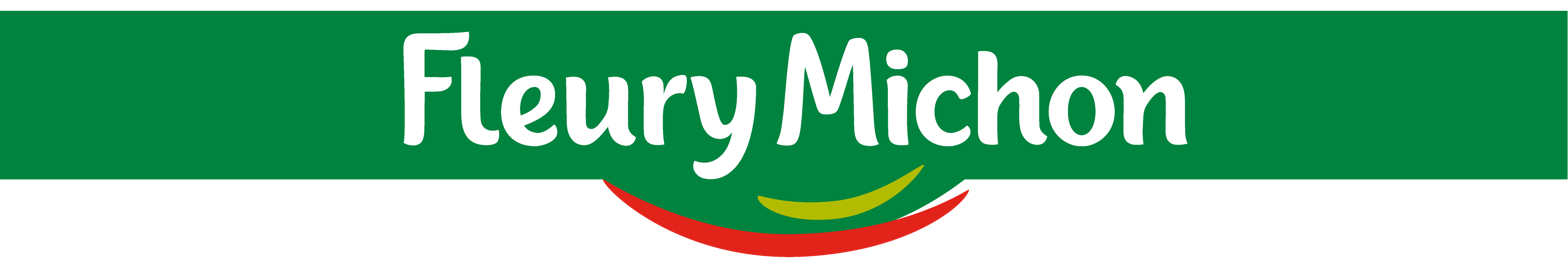
- Traded as: Euronext Growth
- Industry: activities of head offices
- Revenue: 747,620,000 (2019)
- Net income: −43,035,000 (2019)

Fleury Michon (French pronunciation: [flœʁi miʃɔ̃]) is a French agri-food business quoted at the Bourse de Paris as part of the CAC Small 90.

In June 2015, its products were the second most bought in France for agri-food products, behind Herta and ahead of Président. Fleury Michon was founded in 1905 by Félix Fleury and Lucien Michon and employs around 3800 people.. It recently expanded in the retail, travel, and food service industry. Delta Daily food changed its name to Fleury Michon in 2018 after they were acquired by Fleury Michon.

== History ==
On 20 February 2023, the company announced the closure of its factory in Ille-et-Vilaine, in Rennes.
