= Killin' Time (Tina Cousins song) =

1997 single by Tina Cousins

- Artwork for "Killin' Time '99"

Single by Tina Cousins

from the album Killing Time
- Released: 9 June 1997
- Length: 3:58
- Label: Jive; Eastern Bloc
- Songwriters: Mark Topham; Karl Twigg
- Producers: Mark Topham; Karl Twigg

Tina Cousins singles chronology
"Killin' Time" (1997)	"Angel" (1997)
"Pray" (1998)	"Killin' Time '99" (1999)	"Thank ABBA for the Music" (1999)

Music video
- "Killin' Time" on YouTube

"Killin' Time" is a song by British singer-songwriter Tina Cousins, released on 9 June 1997 as the lead single from her debut album, Killing Time (1999). The song was written by Mark Topham and Karl Twigg and initially charted at number 80 on the UK Singles Chart. In 1999, German DJ Sash!, who had collaborated with Cousins on "Mysterious Times", remixed "Killin' Time" for its re-release on 15 March 1999. "Killin' Time '99" peaked at number 15 in the United Kingdom, number 16 in Finland, and number 17 in Spain.

== Critical reception ==
AllMusic editor MacKenzie Wilson described the song as a "jaunty pop tune twisted into a trance-like vibe". Michael Paoletta from Billboard complimented it as a "buoyant" hit. In 1999, a reviewer from Birmingham Evening Mail wrote, "The voice of Sash's "Mysterious Times", Cousins has returned to the dance pop sounds of the keyboard master for her second solo release. A relentless electronic beat underpins the sensual vocals which should prove a staple in the clubs leading up to the summer season." Chuck Campbell from Knoxville News Sentinel deemed it as "dark-tinged" in his review of Killing Time. Talia Jackson from Dayton Daily News said, "Brightening an otherwise familiar electronic techno setting, tracks such as "Killin' Time" and "Mysterious Times" mesh with her vocals." Chris Finan from Music Week's RM gave the 1997 version four out of five, remarking that the Fishead mix "really is very good". Smash Hits declared it as a "hard hittin' floor filler", adding that it is "setting feet and booties moving in clubs everywhere. Tina has a huge voice." An editor from Sunday Mirror felt that "this is pure Saturday night disco", saying, "Where's my stilettos?"

== Chart performance ==
"Killin' Time" was a top-10 hit in Scotland and a top 20 hit in Finland, Spain, and the United Kingdom, where it peaked at number 15 on the UK Singles Chart on 21 March 1999; the single had previously charted at number 80 on its first release in 1997. During its second run on the chart, "Killin' Time" spent four weeks in the top 100. The single also peaked at number 12 on the UK Dance Singles Chart and number four on the UK Indie Singles Chart. In the Flanders region of Belgium, it spent nine weeks on the Ultratop 50, peaking at number 30 in May 1999. In the Netherlands, "Killin' Time" also was a top-30 hit, peaking at number 23 on both the Dutch Top 40 and Single Top 100 charts in August 1997. On the Eurochart Hot 100, it reached number 57 on 3 April 1999. The song also charted in Romania, ranking in at number 64 on the country's year-end chart for 1999.

== Music video ==
A music video was produced to promote the single. It features Cousins alone in a room, performing the song. In between, there are black-and-white scenes from a party at the same place. Here, the singer is seen dancing and having fun with other people. Other scenes also shows Cousins sitting alone in a couch, while people are walking by or around.

== Track listings ==
- UK CD single (1997)
1. "Killin' Time" (radio edit) – 3:59
2. "Killin' Time" (Fishead club mix) – 6:50
3. "Killin' Time" (W.I.P. dub) – 6:22
4. "Killin' Time" (Rhythm Masters Murder Mix) – 7:00
- UK 12-inch single (1997)

A1. "Killin' Time" (Fishead club mix) – 6:50
AA1. "Killin' Time" (Rhythm Masters Murder Mix) – 7:00
AA2. "Killin' Time" (W.I.P. dub) – 6:22

- European CD single (1997)
1. "Killin' Time" (radio edit) – 3:59
2. "Killin' Time" (Fishead club mix) – 6:50
- UK CD single (1999)
1. "Killin' Time" ('99 radio edit) – 4:05
2. "Killin' Time" (original) – 3:59
3. "Killin' Time" (Sash! radio edit) – 3:30
4. "Killin' Time" (Nelson's filthy dub) – 5:23
- UK 12-inch single (1999)

A1. "Killin' Time" (Sash! maxi mix) – 4:55
A2. "Killin' Time" (Grant's club vocal) – 5:22
B1. "Killin' Time" (Rhythm Masters Murder) – 7:02

- UK cassette single (1999)
1. "Killin' Time" ('99 radio edit) – 4:05
2. "Killin' Time" (Sash! maxi mix) – 4:53
- European CD single (1999)
1. "Killin' Time" ('99 radio edit) – 4:05
2. "Killin' Time" (original) – 3:59
- European maxi-CD single (1999)
1. "Killin' Time" (Sash! radio edit) – 3:30
2. "Killin' Time" ('99 radio edit) – 4:05
3. "Killin' Time" (original) – 3:59
4. "Killin' Time" (Nelson's filthy dub) – 5:23

== Charts ==
=== Weekly charts ===
Chart (1997–1999)	Peak position
Belgium (Ultratop 50 Flanders)	30
Europe (Eurochart Hot 100)	57
Finland (Suomen virallinen lista)	16
Netherlands (Dutch Top 40)	23
Netherlands (Single Top 100)	23
Scotland Singles (Official Charts)	10
Spain (Promusicae)	17
UK Singles (Official Charts)	15
UK Dance (Official Charts)	14
UK Indie (Official Charts)	4
UK Club Chart (Music Week)	18

=== Year-end charts ===
Chart (1999)	Position
Romania (Romanian Top 100)	64
