= Wonderful Life (Black song) =

1986 song by Black

Single by Black

from the album Wonderful Life
- B-side: "Life Calls"
- Released: September 1986
- Studio: Powerplant (Willesden, London)
- Genre: Pop, Synth-pop, Sophisti-pop
- Length: 4:49
- Label: Ugly Man (1986); A&M (1987)
- Songwriter: Colin Vearncombe
- Producer: Dave "Dix" Dickie

Black singles chronology
| "More Than the Sun" (1984) | "Wonderful Life" (1986) | "Everything's Coming Up Roses" (1986) |
| "Sweetest Smile" (1987) | "Wonderful Life" (1987) | "I'm Not Afraid" (1987) |

Music video
- Black - Wonderful Life (Official Video) on YouTube

"Wonderful Life" is a song by British singer Black, from his 1987 debut album, Wonderful Life. The song was released twice as a single and was successful the second time, becoming a top-10 hit in Australia, Austria, France, Germany, Italy, Switzerland, the Netherlands and the United Kingdom. Black, who wrote the song while broke, commented: "I was really being ironic... Most people took it at face value."

== Single release ==
First released in September 1986 by Ugly Man Records, "Wonderful Life" initially peaked at number 72 on the UK Singles Chart. The label and Vearncombe then decided to re-release the song with a new record company, A&M Records after the success of "Sweetest Smile". Re-issued on 14 August 1987, the single reached a higher peak of number eight on the chart in August 1987.

== Critical reception ==
In a contemporary review in Smash Hits, Vici McDonald called it a "wonderful record – sentimental without being slushy". She went on: "It's heartening to see someone who a) isn't particularly handsome, b) has a spook-name (i.e. Colin Vearncombe), c) has no discernible 'image' and d) writes slightly odd lyrics, get into the charts purely on the strength of their music, which in this case is very strong indeed." The song was described by AllMusic as a "seductive, bittersweet ballad". The Daily Telegraph said: "Its oddly uplifting lyrics... combined with Black's melancholy croon created, as one critic observed, 'luxuriantly melodic pop that sounds something like a male version of Sade'." Lesley O'Toole of Record Mirror praised the song, describing it "a beeeautiful [sic] balmy antidote to today's 99 per cent inconsequential output. A smooth coating of non-drip vocal gloss glides over a melody which seduces you with its eyes shut... Simplicity and perfection itself". Kez Owen of Sounds called it "one of those tunes you hum nigglingly all day without realising".

== Music video ==
The music video, shot in black and white, was filmed around the English seaside resort of Southport, Merseyside, as well as Wallasey near Black's hometown of Liverpool, and features New Brighton Lighthouse and promenade. The video includes the Looping Star rollercoaster, a ride at Pleasureland at the time, as well as The Galleon fairground ride, the shrimping boat, local shops and residents. It was directed by Gerard de Thame, husband of television presenter Rachel de Thame, and won an award at the New York Film Festival in 1988.

== Credits and personnel ==
Credits are lifted from the single's liner notes and AllMusic.

Studios

- Recorded at Powerplant Studios (London), Square One Studio (Bury) and Pink Studio (Liverpool).

Personnel

- Colin Vearncombe – vocals
- Roy Corkill – fretless bass
- Jimmy Hughes – drums
- Martin Green – saxophone
- Dave "Dix" Dickie – keyboards, programming
- The Creamy Whirls (Tina Labrinski, Sara Lamarra), Doreen Edwards – backing vocals
- Jimmy Sangster – fretted bass
- The Sidwell Brothers – brass section

== Formats and track listings ==
7-inch single

1. "Wonderful Life" – 4:49
2. "Life Calls" – 3:51

12-inch maxi single

1. "Wonderful Life" – 4:49
2. "Life Calls" – 3:51
3. "Had Enough" – 4:58
4. "All We Need Is the Money" – 4:23

== Charts ==
=== Weekly charts ===
1986 weekly chart performance for "Wonderful Life"
| Chart (1986) | Peak position |
|---|---|
| UK Singles (Official Charts) | 72 |

1987–1988 weekly chart performance for "Wonderful Life"
| Chart (1987–1988) | Peak position |
|---|---|
| Australia (Australian Music Report) | 7 |
| Austria (Ö3 Austria Top 40) | 1 |
| Belgium (Ultratop 50 Flanders) | 6 |
| Europe (Eurochart Hot 100 Singles) | 5 |
| France (SNEP) | 2 |
| Ireland (IRMA) | 7 |
| Italy (Musica e dischi) | 9 |
| Luxembourg (Radio Luxembourg) | 5 |
| Netherlands (Dutch Top 40) | 7 |
| Netherlands (Single Top 100) | 10 |
| Portugal (UNEVA) | 2 |
| Spain (AFYVE) | 7 |
| Switzerland (Schweizer Hitparade) | 2 |
| UK Singles (Official Charts) | 8 |
| West Germany (GfK) | 2 |

1994 weekly chart performance for "Wonderful Life"
| Chart (1994) | Peak position |
|---|---|
| Ireland (IRMA) | 30 |
| UK Singles (Official Charts) | 42 |

2013 weekly chart performance for "Wonderful Life"
| Chart (2013) | Peak position |
|---|---|
| Slovenia (SloTop50) | 26 |

2026 weekly chart performance for "Wonderful Life"
| Chart (2026) | Peak position |
|---|---|
| Poland (Polish Airplay Top 100) | 58 |

=== Year-end charts ===
1987 year-end chart performance for "Wonderful Life"
| Chart (1987) | Position |
|---|---|
| Belgium (Ultratop 50 Flanders) | 36 |
| Europe (Eurochart Hot 100 Singles) | 92 |
| Netherlands (Dutch Top 40) | 93 |
| Netherlands (Single Top 100) | 96 |
| West Germany (Media Control) | 69 |

1988 year-end chart performance for "Wonderful Life"
| Chart (1988) | Position |
|---|---|
| Austria (Ö3 Austria Top 40) | 8 |
| Europe (Eurochart Hot 100 Singles) | 30 |
| West Germany (Media Control) | 50 |

== Certifications ==
Certifications and sales for "Wonderful Life"
| Region | Certification | Certified units/sales |
|---|---|---|
| France (SNEP) | Gold | 500,000^{*} |
| Germany (BVMI) | Gold | 500,000^{^} |
| United Kingdom (BPI) | Silver | 200,000^{‡} |
^{*} Sales figures based on certification alone.^{^} Shipments figures based on certification alone.^{‡} Sales+streaming figures based on certification alone.

== Mathilde Santing version ==
"Wonderful Life"

Single by Mathilde Santing

from the album To Others to One
- Released: 1999
- Label: Epic
- Songwriter: Colin Vearncombe
- Producer: John Tilly

Mathilde Santing singles chronology
| "Inspiratie" (1997) | "Wonderful Life" (1999) | "Come to Me" (2005) |

Dutch singer Mathilde Santing recorded her own cover version of "Wonderful Life" on her 1999 album To Others to One. It was released as a maxi single and was used in a television advertisement for Interpolis, a Dutch insurance company, in 2005. In addition to the album To Others to One, it is also on the albums 20 jaar hits 1981–2001 (Muziek 20 Daagse 2001) and 100 Love Songs [2008].

=== Weekly charts ===
Weekly chart performance for Mathilde Santing's cover
| Chart (1999) | Peak position |
|---|---|
| Netherlands (Dutch Top 40) | 6 |
| Netherlands (Single Top 100) | 5 |

=== Year-end charts ===
1999 year-end chart performance for Mathilde Santing's cover
| Chart (1999) | Position |
|---|---|
| Netherlands (Dutch Top 40) | 44 |
| Netherlands (Single Top 100) | 43 |

== Tina Cousins version ==
"Wonderful Life"

Single by Tina Cousins

from the album Mastermind
- Released: 30 May 2005
- Studio: Charlton Farm (Bath, England)
- Length: 3:53
- Label: All Around the World; Big
- Songwriter: Colin Vearncombe
- Producers: Louie Nicastro; Tom Maddicott

Tina Cousins singles chronology
| "Hymn" (2005) | "Wonderful Life" (2005) | "Come to Me" (2005) |

Audio
- "Wonderful Life" on YouTube

British singer Tina Cousins covered "Wonderful" for her second studio album, Mastermind (2005). She recorded it at Charlton Farm Studios in Bath, England. This version, produced by Louie Nicastro and Tom Maddicott, was released in Australia on 30 May 2005 and reached number 17 on the country's ARIA Singles Chart the following month. In the United Kingdom, following a digital release in late November 2005, the cover debuted and peaked at number 58 on the UK Singles Chart on 4 December 2005. The song also charted in Finland, reaching number 17 on the Finnish Singles Chart.

=== Track listings ===
UK CD single

1. "Wonderful Life" (dance radio edit)
2. "Wonderful Life" (ballad version)
3. "Wonderful Life" (extended mix)
4. "Wonderful Life" (Kenny Hayes Sunshine Funk remix)
5. "Wonderful Life" (Lee S remix)
6. "Wonderful Life" (Low Frequency Occupation club mix)

UK digital download

1. "Wonderful Life" (dance radio edit) – 3:53
2. "Wonderful Life" (extended mix) – 8:18
3. "Wonderful Life" (Kenny Hayes Sunshine Funk remix) – 6:25
4. "Wonderful Life" (Lee S remix) – 6:20
5. "Wonderful Life" (ballad version) – 3:20
6. "Wonderful Life" (Low Frequency Occupation club mix) – 7:18

Australian and New Zealand maxi-CD single

1. "Wonderful Life" (dance version) – 3:53
2. "Wonderful Life" (ballad version) – 3:20
3. "Wonderful Life" (Low Frequency Occupation radio edit) – 3:50
4. "Wonderful Life" (Low Frequency Occupation club mix) – 7:18
5. "Wonderful Life" (Methods of Flow club mix) – 6:12
6. "Wonderful Life" (Low Frequency Occupation Dubful Life) – 6:36

=== Credits and personnel ===
Credits are lifted from the UK CD single liner notes.

Studio

- Recorded at Charlton Farm Studios (Bath, Somerset, England)

Personnel

- Colin Vearncombe – writing
- Louie Nicastro, Tom Maddicott – production
- Sil Wilcox – worldwide representation
- PixelFrame.com.au – cover design

=== Charts ===
==== Weekly charts ====
Weekly chart performance for Tina Cousins' cover
| Chart (2005) | Peak position |
|---|---|
| Australia (ARIA) | 17 |
| Australian Dance (ARIA) | 2 |
| Finland (Suomen virallinen lista) | 17 |
| Scottish Singles Sales (Official Charts) | 32 |
| UK Singles (Official Charts) | 58 |
| UK Dance (Official Charts) | 30 |

==== Year-end charts ====
Year-end chart performance for Tina Cousins' cover
| Chart (2005) | Position |
|---|---|
| Australian Dance (ARIA) | 15 |

=== Release history ===
Release dates for Tina Cousins' cover
| Region | Date | Format(s) | Label | Ref. |
|---|---|---|---|---|
| Australia | 30 May 2005 | Maxi-CD | Big | |
| United Kingdom | 28 November 2005 | Digital download | All Around the World | |
| United Kingdom | 28 November 2005 | CD | All Around the World | |

== Other cover versions ==
Macedonian darkwave band Arhangel covered the song in their native language as "Čudesen svet" on their 1993 album Arhangel II.

Wondere reis (Wonderful Journey), is a 2000 Dutch-language version of the song released in Belgium by a group of celebrity singers for charity under the name "Levenslijn 2000".

A dance version by TJ Davis reached No. 42 on the UK Singles Chart and No. 13 on the UK Dance Singles Chart in December 2001.

Swedish band Ace of Base covered the song on their 2002 album Da Capo.

Belgian and Canadian singer Lara Fabian covered the song on her 2004 album A Wonderful Life.

In 2007 Italian musician Zucchero released the EP "Wonderful life", which includes his cover version of the song. A music video for the version was released on 2009.

In 2011 the song featured on the Christmas album Funny Looking Angels by Smith & Burrows, a collaboration between Tom Smith (Editors) and Andy Burrows (We Are Scientists and Razorlight).

In 2016 Belgian singer Kate Ryan covered the song and released it as a non-album single.

== Use in the media ==
- The song was used in TV advertisements for Fleury Michon meat products in France in the 2000s, but was not sung by Black.
- In 2008/2009 it was used by Emirates to promote air travel to Dubai.
- In 2015 a cover by Katie Melua was used for Premier Inn's £25 million TV advertising campaign.
- In June 2025, as Israel stepped up its attacks on Iran and Lebanon, a viral video on X offered an unusual contrast. Social media users could see a scene in which artist Ralph Asfour performed Black’s “Wonderful Life” in public from a rooftop in Beirut, while missiles streaked across the night sky behind him.
