= Big Records =

Australian independent record label

- Parent company: Rajon Music Group
- Founded: 1999; 26 years ago
- Founder: Paul Paoliello; Peter "Reggie" Bowman
- Defunct: 2003; 22 years ago
- Genre: Various
- Country of origin: Australia
- Location: Sydney, Australia
- Official website: www.bigrecords.com.au

Big Records was an Australian independent record label based in Sydney. It was founded by Paul Paoliello, former Managing Director of Zomba Records' Australasian affiliate from its inception in 1999 until its sale to Rajon Music Group in 2003. Its artists include Tina Cousins, The Teenage Idols, 888, Melissa Tkautz, Groove Armada, Ashanti, Melanie C, Hanson and Big Night.

== See also ==
- Lists of record labels
- Bertelsmann Music Group
