= Are We Having Fun Yet? (album) =

Studio album by Black
- Released: 1993
- Length: 44:55
- Label: Chaos Reins; Nero Schwarz
- Producer: Mike Hedges; Black

Black chronology
Black (1991)	Are We Having Fun Yet? (1993)	The Accused (1999)

Are We Having Fun Yet? is the fourth studio album by English singer-songwriter Black, which was released in 1993.

== Background ==
Black recorded Are We Having Fun Yet? after parting from A&M Records in 1992. It was the singer's first album to be released under his own independent label, Chaos Reins/Nero Schwarz. Some territories saw the album released under distribution deals with other labels, including Polydor (Germany), Tomzo (Poland), Tabata (Spain) and Festival (Australia). Most editions of the album had artwork showing three flies pinned down on a white surface, but a different sleeve, featuring a photograph of Black, was used for an alternative UK CD release, the Japanese CD release and the European vinyl LP release.

Four singles were released from Are We Having Fun Yet?, but they did not generate commercial success. "Don't Take The Silence Too Hard" was released in Germany and Australia, "Wishing You Were Here" was released in Europe, "Just Like Love" was released in the UK only and "Swingtime" was released in Spain only.

Black later recalled on his official website, "There were some good songs on Are We Having Fun Yet? and although some lacked focus it was enough to take me to the next step. It got a really good review in Q but it didn't do well enough to stop me falling below the radar in the UK."

== Critical reception ==
Professional ratings
Review scores
Source	Rating
The Encyclopedia of Popular Music	3/4 stars

In a review of the single release of "Just Like Love", Andrew Boyd of the Reading Evening Post wrote, "This song shows Black deserves to be more than a one-hit wonder ['Wonderful Life']. A good ballad, it has a downbeat feel and jazzy touches, but it's wistful rather than wonderful."

== Track listing ==
All tracks are written by Colin Vearncombe

No.	Title	Length
1.	"Don't Take the Silence Too Hard"	4:18
2.	"Swingtime"	5:33
3.	"Wishing You Were Here"	4:42
4.	"Leaving Song"	3:44
5.	"That's Just Like Love"	3:49
6.	"Ave Lolita"	5:26
7.	"Wish the World Awake"	3:56
8.	"Paper Crown"	5:13
9.	"Change Your Mind"	3:57
10.	"To Take a Piece"	4:17

== Personnel ==
Credits are adapted from the CD album booklet's liner notes.

- Black – vocals (tracks 1–10), all other instruments (tracks 1–10), backing vocals (track 7)
- Martin Ditcham – percussion (tracks 1–2, 4–5, 7–9)
- Greg Harewood – bass (tracks 1–2)
- Martin Green – saxophone (tracks 1, 5, 8), flute (tracks 1, 5, 8), horn arrangement (track 5)
- Martin McCarrick – cello (tracks 6, 8, 10), string arrangement (tracks 6, 8, 10)
- Pete Davis – additional keyboards and programming (tracks 3, 6, 8–10)
- Camilla Griehsel-Vearncombe – backing vocals (track 7)
- Doreen Edwards – backing vocals (track 8)

Production

- Mike Hedges, Black – producers (all tracks)
- Andy Todd – recording (all tracks)
- Ken Thomas – mixing (tracks 1, 3, 5–6), engineering (tracks 1, 3, 5–6)
- Lance Phillips – mixing (tracks 2, 4, 7–10), engineer (tracks 2, 4, 7–10)
- Rattika, Phillipe Garcia, Gravel Macintosh – recording assistants, mixing assistants
- Michael Gaunt – LP co-ordination, creative collaboration, sequencing
- Karen Rainford – smooth running

Other

- John Warwicker – art direction, photography, design
- Steve Dunn, Graham Wood – design, typography
