= Perry Ogden =

British fashion and documentary photographer

Perry Ogden (born 1961) is a British fashion and documentary photographer, and film director, based in Dublin. He is interested in Traveller culture.

Ogden has published three books of photography, Pony Kids (1999), 7 Reece Mews: Francis Bacon's Studio (2001) and Paddy and Liam (2018). Some of his work is held in the Irish Museum of Modern Art and the National Portrait Gallery, London.

His film Pavee Lackeen: The Traveller Girl (2005) is a drama about Irish Travellers. It won Best Film at the Irish Film & Television Awards, the Satyajit Ray Award for Best First Film at the BFI London Film Festival, the Rainer Werner Fassbinder Prize and Ecumenical Film Prize at the International Filmfestival Mannheim-Heidelberg, and Best First Feature Audience Award at Galway Film Fleadh.

He has worked commercially as a fashion photographer doing magazine and advertising campaign work.

== Life and work ==
Ogden was born in 1961 in Shropshire, UK. He grew up in London, was educated at Eton College and first went to Ireland in 1985. He is now based in Dublin.

While at Eton, he published a magazine called Lipstick in 1979. He spent two years making portraits of the young riders and dealers in Smithfield horse market in Dublin, for his first book Pony Kids (1999).

Inspired by what he had witnessed making Pony Kids, Ogden's first feature length film was Pavee Lackeen: The Traveller Girl (2005), a documentary-style semi-improvised drama about Irish Travellers. He cast several members of the Maughan family as close versions of themselves and "wrote a script that draws on the Maughans’ experiences of living in a trailer on the edge of Dublin and encountering the sharp end of Irish bureaucracy."

Two brothers, boxers Paddy and Liam Doran from a Traveller family in Celbridge, County Kildare, modelled for Ogden when they were between ages 10 and 16, for various fashion campaigns. Ogden used these photographs for his book Paddy and Liam (2018).

== Publications ==
=== Photography books by Ogden ===
- Pony Kids. New York: Aperture, 1999; ISBN 978-0893818593. London: Jonathan Cape, 1999; ISBN 978-0224059220. Edited by Ronnie Cooke Newhouse. With an introduction by Fintan O'Toole.
- 7 Reece Mews: Francis Bacon's Studio. London: Thames & Hudson, 2001. ISBN 978-0500510346. With a foreword by John Edwards.
- Paddy and Liam. Idea, 2018. Edition of 500 copies. Accompanying each image is commentary from the subjects.

=== Publications with contributions by Ogden ===
- The Fourfold View of a Star. Sky Dog, 1994. By Ogden, Bruno de Monès, Jonathan Becker, and Maki Fujimoto. Text in English, French and German.
- Fragments: Architecture and the Unfinished: Essays presented to Robin Middleton. Thames & Hudson, 2006. Edited by Barry Bergdoll and Werner Oechslin. ISBN 978-0500342145. Published to mark the retirement of architectural historian Robin Middleton.

== Films directed by Ogden ==
- Pavee Lackeen: The Traveller Girl (2005) – feature-length drama, starring Winnie Maughan and Michael Collins
- John Berger Reads Ghassan Kanafani's 'Letter from Gaza' (2008) – short drama

== Awards ==
- 2005: Winner, Best Film, 3rd Irish Film & Television Awards (IFTA), for Pavee Lackeen, awarded to Ogden and Martina Niland
- 2005: Satyajit Ray Award for Best First Film, BFI London Film Festival, for Pavee Lackeen
- 2007: Rainer Werner Fassbinder Prize, International Filmfestival Mannheim-Heidelberg, Germany, awarded to Ogden for Pavee Lackeen
- 2007: Ecumenical Film Prize, International Filmfestival Mannheim-Heidelberg, Germany, for Pavee Lackeen
- 2007: Best First Feature Audience Award, Galway Film Fleadh, Galway, Ireland, for Pavee Lackeen

== Exhibitions ==
- Pony Kids, Smithfield, Dublin, May 1997
- 7 Reece Mews, Francis Bacon's Studio, Tony Shafrazi Gallery, SoHo, New York City, January 2002

== Collections ==
- Irish Museum of Modern Art (IMMA), Dublin
- National Portrait Gallery, London: 2 prints

== See also ==
- Desmond Guinness
