= Black (singer) =

English singer-songwriter (1962–2016)

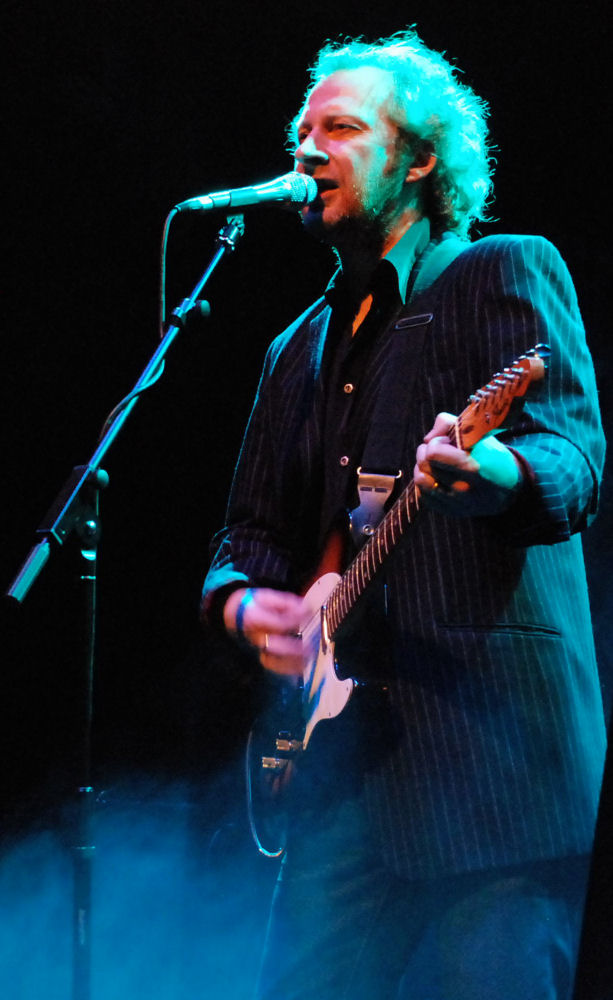
- Black in Birkenhead, March 2007

Background information
- Born: Colin Vearncombe; 26 May 1962; West Derby, Liverpool, England
- Died: 26 January 2016 (aged 53) Wilton, Cork, Ireland
- Genres: Rock; new wave
- Years active: 1981–2016
- Labels: WEA; A&M; Ugly Man; Nero Schwarz
- Website: Official website

Colin Vearncombe (26 May 1962 – 26 January 2016), known by his stage name Black, was an English singer-songwriter. He emerged from the punk rock music scene and achieved mainstream pop success in the late 1980s, most notably with the 1986 single "Wonderful Life", which was an international hit the next year.

William Ruhlmann of AllMusic described Vearncombe as a "smoky-voiced singer/songwriter, whose sophisticated jazz-pop songs and dramatic vocal delivery place him somewhere between Bryan Ferry and Morrissey". Michael Hann of The Guardian described his voice as a "slightly frayed baritone".

== Early life ==
Vearncombe was born in the West Derby district of Liverpool and attended Prescot Grammar School. He then enrolled on an art foundation course at Liverpool Polytechnic. He first aspired to become a musician after seeing Elvis Presley in the 1957 film Jailhouse Rock.

== Career ==
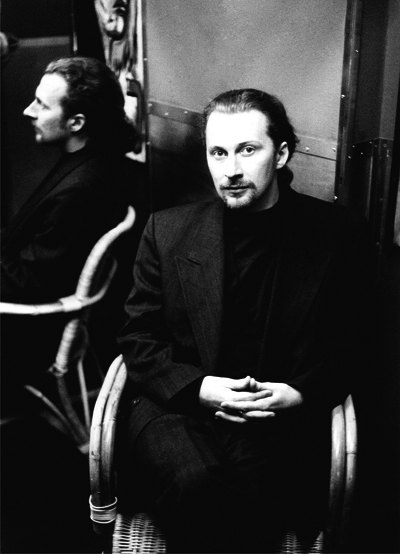
Black in the 1990s

Black's first release was the single "Human Features" on Rox Records from Birkenhead in 1981. At this time the band also included Dane Goulding (formerly of Blazetroopers) on bass and Greg Leyland (another school friend) on drums, with Vearncombe calling himself Black as he did not think his own surname would be remembered. The single was followed by another independent release, "More than the Sun", in 1982. It was then that Vearncombe formed a friendship with Dave "Dix" Dickie of the Last Chant, and the two became musical collaborators and signed for WEA Records.

In 1982, Black played with the Thompson Twins on their 'Quick Step and Side Kick' tour and also supported Wah! on a UK tour. Black signed with WEA in 1984, and the next single was "Hey Presto", which got Vearncombe noticed outside the UK: the video for the song featured on the satellite channel Music Box, and the single was also released in Australia. The second WEA single was a re-recording of "More than the Sun". After this, Black was dropped from the record label, and Vearncombe and Dix went their separate ways.

In 1985, Vearncombe wrote the minor key song "Wonderful Life". It was released independently through Ugly Man Records, and got Black noticed by A&M Records who signed him and launched his international career. Vearncombe said:

By the end of 1985 I had been in a couple of car crashes, my mother had a serious illness, I had been dropped by a record company, my first marriage went belly-up and I was homeless. Then I sat down and wrote this song called 'Wonderful Life'. I was being sarcastic.

The song reached number eight in the UK Singles Chart. "Wonderful Life" was later covered by singers including Tony Hadley in 1997, and Kim Wilde in 2011. Its widespread popularity came from its use on several advertising commercials for brands that included Standard Life, Cadbury's chocolate and Fleury Michon. A version by Katie Melua was released as charity single in 2015. Vearncombe suffered from the feeling of being a one-hit wonder:

Once you have had a hit, it's hard to write another song without having that in the back of your mind. For a long time, I would find myself hearing, 'I like it but it's not Wonderful Life'.

At first, the single "Everything's Coming Up Roses" flopped, but the follow-up, "Sweetest Smile" became a UK top-10 hit. The third single, a re-release of "Wonderful Life", was a massive hit worldwide. The album of the same name, released in 1987, had similar success, reaping commercial and critical acclaim.

Black sold over two million records worldwide with Comedy (1988) and Black (1991). Disillusioned with having to deal with a big record company, Vearncombe founded the independent label Nero Schwarz (which is the word "black" in Italian and in German, respectively), and released one album Are We Having Fun Yet? (1993).

In 1991, Vearncombe co-founded the Tomato design collective, a worldwide group of directors, designers, artists, writers, producers and composers. He served as a director until 1995.

After a prolonged hiatus, Vearncombe returned in 1999 to release a string of recordings under his own name. Vearncombe returned to the name 'Black' to release the album Between Two Churches in November 2005. On this album, he included a song mocking the success of his hit "Wonderful Life", where he poignantly re-asked the question, ‘Are you having a wonderful life?’

In 2009, he released two albums: The Given was issued on 4 July as a free download under Vearncombe's name; Water on Stone was released on 17 November as the first Black studio album in four years. In September 2011, the album Any Colour You Like was released through Black's website.

In April 2014, Vearncombe started a pledge fund (via the dedicated music crowd-funding site PledgeMusic) for a new album, co-written with long-time friend and musical collaborator Calum MacColl. This was the first time he had participated in a crowd-funded project. The project significantly exceeded its funding goals, and he regularly expressed his surprise and gratefulness through video updates on the PledgeMusic site. His experience with the process also contributed to the name of the album, Blind Faith, was released on 13 April 2015. Several months later, he recorded a Catalan version of "Wonderful Life" as a fundraiser for the Catalan telethon La Marató de TV3. Vearncombe sang a Catalan translation of the original lyrics.

== Death ==
On 10 January 2016, Vearncombe was involved in a car crash near Cork Airport in Ireland, and placed in a medically induced coma after sustaining serious head injuries. He never regained consciousness and died from his injuries at the intensive care unit of Cork University Hospital on 26 January 2016, at the age of 53. Vearncombe left a widow, Swedish opera singer and former One 2 Many singer Camilla Griehsel, and three children. He was cremated on 4 February 2016.

== Discography ==
- Wonderful Life (1987)
- Comedy (1988)
- Black (1991)
- Are We Having Fun Yet? (1993)
- The Accused (1999)
- Water on Snow (2000)
- Smoke Up Close (2002)
- Between Two Churches (2005)
- The Given (2009)
- Water on Stone (2009)
- Blind Faith (2015)
