= Russell Watson discography =

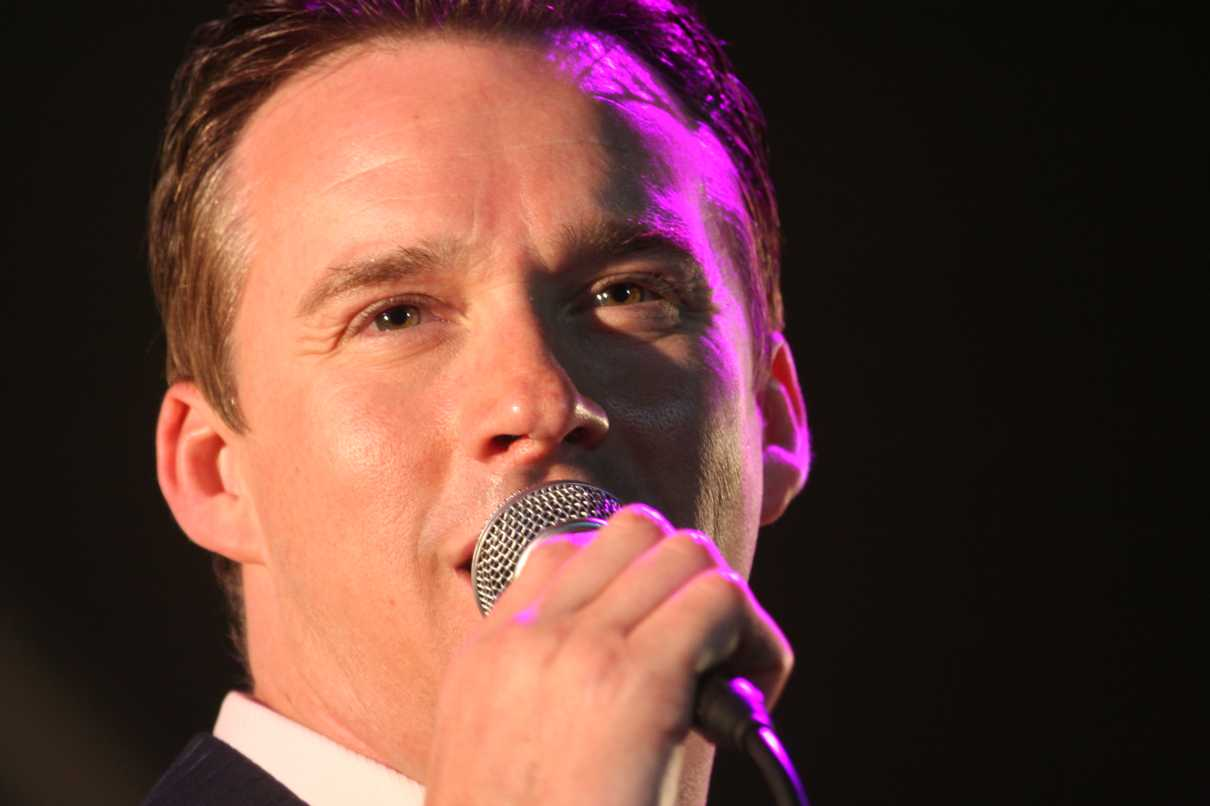
- Watson performing at Broadlands, in Hampshire, England, in 2007
- Studio albums: 15
- Compilation albums: 6
- Singles: 13

The discography of Russell Watson, a British operatic and pop tenor, consists of fifteen studio albums, six compilation albums, thirteen singles, and a number of other appearances.

Watson's debut album, The Voice, was released in September 2000. A mixture of operatic arias and covers of pop songs, it topped the UK Classical Chart and eventually reached number five in the UK Albums Chart. Later, when released in the United States, the album took the number one spot and made history as the first time a British artist had held both the US and UK classical number one. The album contained a collaboration with former Happy Mondays singer Shaun Ryder, who lent his vocals to the Freddie Mercury and Montserrat Caballé song "Barcelona". The album also featured a duet with Cleo of girl group Cleopatra on the song "Someone Like You". Cleo later duetted with Russell again on his third album Reprise on the song "The Best That Love Can Be".

In late 2002, Watson released the single, "Nothing Sacred – A Song for Kirsty", to raise money for the Francis House children's hospice in Didsbury, Manchester. The campaign to raise £5 million was fronted by Kirsty Howard, a seven-year-old girl with a serious heart defect. The song reached number 17 in the UK Singles Chart.

The self-styled "People's Tenor", who is also known as "The Voice" after his first album, won the Album of the Year at the Classical BRIT Awards in both 2001 and 2002, also collecting awards for Best-Selling Debut Album (2001) and Best-Selling Album (2002).

Watson collaborated with Welsh singer Aled Jones for albums released in 2018, 2019 and 2022. Their most recent album, Christmas with Aled and Russell was released in November 2022 and charted at number 14 on the UK Albums chart. His fifteenth studio album, Shine, in collaboration with Helen Jane Long, was released in December 2024.

== Albums ==
=== Studio albums ===
Year	Album details	Peak chart positions								Certifications (sales thresholds)
Year	Album details	UK	AUS	IRE	NZ	PT	SWE	US	US Classical	Certifications (sales thresholds)
2000	The Voice: Released: 25 September 2000; Label: Decca; Formats: CD	5	10	23	23	1	17	90	1	UK: 2× Platinum; AUS: Gold
2001	Encore: Released: 29 October 2001; Label: Decca; Formats: CD	6	15	27	1	—	—	114	1	UK: 2× Platinum
2002	Reprise: Released: 18 November 2002; Label: Decca; Formats: CD	13	11	55	6	—	—	—	6	UK: Platinum
2004	Amore Musica: Released: 25 October 2004; Label: Decca; Formats: CD, digital download	10	10	—	2	5	—	—	6	UK: Gold
2007	That's Life: Released: 5 March 2007; Label: Decca; Formats: CD, digital download	4	—	—	—	—	—	—	—	UK: Gold
2007	Outside In: Released: 26 November 2007; Label: Decca; Formats: CD, digital download	14	—	—	—	24	—	—	—	
2008	People Get Ready: Released: 17 November 2008; Label: Decca; Formats: CD, digital download	20	—	—	—	—	—	—	—	
2010	La Voce: Released: 22 November 2010; Label: Epic; Formats: CD, digital download	13	31	56	5	—	—	—	—	
2012	Anthems – Music to Inspire a Nation: Released: 28 May 2012; Label: Sony Classical; Formats: CD, digital download	5	—	—	—	—	—	—	—	
2013	Only One Man: Released: 11 November 2013; Label: Sony Classical; Formats: CD, digital download	17	—	—	—	—	—	—	—	
2016	True Stories: Released: 4 November 2016; Label: Sony Classical; Formats: CD, digital download	30	—	—	—	—	—	—	—	
2018	In Harmony (with Aled Jones): Released: 9 November 2018; Label: BMG; Formats: CD, digital download, streaming	8	—	—	—	—	—	—	—	
2019	Back in Harmony (with Aled Jones): Released: 1 November 2019; Label: BMG; Formats: CD, digital download, streaming	7	—	—	—	—	—	—	—	
2022	Christmas with Aled and Russell (with Aled Jones): Released: 11 November 2022; Label: BMG; Formats: CD, digital download, streaming	14	—	—	—	—	—	—	—	
2024	Shine (with Helen Jane Long): Released: 7 December 2024; Label: BLE Music; Formats: CD, digital download, streaming	—	—	—	—	—	—	—	—	

=== Compilation albums ===
Year	Album details	Peak chart positions					
Year	Album details	UK	AUS	IRE	NZ	PT	US Classical
2006	The Voice: The Ultimate Collection: Released: 13 March 2006; Label: Decca; Formats: CD, digital download	2	90	70	9	—	40
2006	The Very Best of Russell Watson: Released: June 2006; Label: Farol Música / Decca; Formats: CD	—	—	—	—	7	—
2008	The Ultimate Collection: Special Edition: Released: 26 May 2008; Label: Decca; Formats: CD, digital download	17	—	—	—	—	—
2010	With Love from Russell Watson: Released: 18 January 2010; Label: Decca; Formats: CD, digital download	—	—	—	—	—	—
2010	The Platinum Collection: Released: 15 November 2010; Label: Decca; Formats: CD, digital download	14	84	—	—	—	—
2020	20: Released: 23 October 2020; Label: Decca; Formats: CD, digital download	10	—	—	—	—	—

== Singles ==
Single	Year	Peak chart positions		Album
Single	Year	UK	IRE	Album
"Swing Low '99"	1999	38	—	Non-album single
"Barcelona (Friends Until the End)" (featuring Shaun Ryder)	2000	68	—	The Voice
"Someone Like You" (featuring Faye Tozer)	2002	10	46	Non-album single
"Nothing Sacred – A Song For Kirsty"	2002	17	—	Reprise
"Can't Help Falling in Love"	2006	69	—	The Ultimate Collection
"Sometimes Love Just Ain't Enough"	2016	—	—	True Stories
"Do You Hear What I Hear?"	2016	—	—	True Stories
"A Spaceman Came Travelling" (with Aled Jones)	2022	—	—	Christmas with Aled and Russell
"O Holy Night" (with Aled Jones)	2022	—	—	Christmas with Aled and Russell
"Shine" (with Helen Jane Long)	2024	—	—	Shine
"You (A Christmas Wish)" (with Helen Jane Long)	2024	—	—	Non-album single
"Unremember" (The Electric Mix)(with Helen Jane Long)	2025	—	—	Non-album single
"Unremember" (Radio Mix)(with Helen Jane Long)	2025	—	—	Non-album single

== Video albums ==
Year	Details	Notes
2001	The Voice: Live: Released: 12 November 2001; Label: Decca; Format: VHS, DVD	Concert footage from Millennium Square on 25 May 2001.
2002	The Voice Live in New Zealand: Released: 11 November 2002; Label: Decca; Format: VHS, DVD	Concert footage from Auckland, New Zealand.
2006	Live 2002 / The Voice: Live: Released: 27 November 2006; Label: Decca; Format: DVD	Two live performances from Watson.
2007	The Voice: The Ultimate Collection: Released: 26 November 2007; Label: Decca; Format: DVD	Compilation of highlights from Watson's live concerts in Leeds, Atlantic City and Auckland.
