= Comin' Atcha =

Comin' Atcha may refer to:

- Comin' Atcha (album), 1973 album by Madeline Bell
- Comin' Atcha! (album), 1998 album by Cleopatra
- Comin' Atcha! (TV series), a television series starring Cleopatra
- Comin' at Ya!, a 1981 3D Western directed by Ferdinando Baldi
