= I Want You Back =

1969 single by the Jackson 5

- Swedish 7" vinyl cover

Single by the Jackson 5

from the album Diana Ross Presents The Jackson 5
- B-side: "Who's Lovin You"
- Released: October 7, 1969
- Recorded: July–September 1969
- Studio: The Sound Factory (Los Angeles, California)
- Genre: Pop; soul
- Length: 2:59
- Label: Motown
- Songwriter: The Corporation
- Producer: The Corporation

The Jackson 5 singles chronology
"Big Boy" (1968)	"I Want You Back" (1969)	"ABC" (1970)

Alternative release(s)
- Solid center variant of the UK single

Audio
- "I Want You Back" on YouTube

"I Want You Back" is the first single by American band the Jackson 5 from their debut album Diana Ross Presents The Jackson 5. It was released by Motown on October 7, 1969, and became the first number-one hit for the band on January 31, 1970. It was performed on the band's first television appearances, on October 18, 1969, on The Hollywood Palace and on their milestone performance on December 14, 1969, on The Ed Sullivan Show. "I Want You Back" has sold over 6 million copies worldwide.

The song, along with a B-side remake of "Who's Lovin' You" by Smokey Robinson & the Miracles, was the only single to be released from the Jackson 5's first album, Diana Ross Presents The Jackson 5. It went to number one on the Soul singles chart for four weeks and held the number-one position on the Billboard Hot 100 singles chart for the week ending January 31, 1970.

"I Want You Back" was ranked 104 on Rolling Stone's 500 Greatest Songs of All Time.

== Production ==
Originally considered for Gladys Knight & the Pips and later for Diana Ross, as "I Wanna Be Free", "I Want You Back" explores the theme of a lover who decides that he was too hasty in dropping his partner. An unusual aspect about "I Want You Back" was that its main lead vocal was performed by a tween, a then-11-year-old Michael Jackson. The song is composed in A-flat major.

"I Want You Back" was released on October 6, 1969, and was the first Jackson 5 single to be released by Motown and the first song written and produced by The Corporation, a team comprising Motown chief Berry Gordy, Freddie Perren, Alphonso Mizell, and Deke Richards. Upon the single release, Record World said "The Jackson 5 are Motown's new soul kings who will quickly charm Top 40 and R&B lovers."

It is the first of four Jackson 5 number-ones released in a row (the others being "ABC" – 1970, "The Love You Save" – 1970, and "I'll Be There" – 1970) and the first Jackson 5 song recorded in Los Angeles, California; the quintet had previously been recording Bobby Taylor-produced remakes of other artists' hits, including "Who's Lovin' You", the B-side to "I Want You Back", at Hitsville U.S.A. in Detroit, Michigan. From late 1969 and on, nearly all of the Jackson 5's recordings were done in Los Angeles when the majority of recordings for other artists on the label were done in Detroit.

Although Gladys Knight had been the first to mention the Jacksons to Berry Gordy, and Bobby Taylor brought the Jackson brothers to Motown, Motown credited Diana Ross with discovering them. This was done not only to help promote the Jackson 5, but also to help ease Ross' transition into a solo career, which she began in 1970 soon after the Jackson 5 became a success.

The song was remixed by Dimitri from Paris and Kenny Hayes for the 2009 release The Remix Suite.

== Live performances ==
The Jackson 5 performed "I Want You Back" during all of their world tours, either as a full song or as a part of the Jackson 5 Medley in concerts (which also included "ABC" and "Mama's Pearl", later on switched with "The Love You Save" in 1973). During their second-ever television appearance (in an episode of The Hollywood Palace hosted by Diana Ross & the Supremes), the Jackson 5 performed "I Want You Back" along with Sly and the Family Stone's "Sing a Simple Song", The Delfonics' "Can You Remember", and James Brown's "There Was a Time". They also performed the song on American Bandstand and The Andy Williams Show.

Michael Jackson performed the song as part of the "Jackson 5 Medley" (which also included the songs "The Love You Save" and "I'll Be There") during all of his world tours: Bad, the Dangerous World Tour and the HIStory World Tour. The song was performed live at the Michael Jackson: 30th Anniversary Celebration in 2001, in which Jackson reunited with his brothers on stage for the first time since 1984. The song was to be performed at Jackson's This Is It comeback concerts in London, which were cancelled due to his death.

== Reception and legacy ==
The song has sold six million copies worldwide. In 1999, "I Want You Back" was also inducted into the Grammy Hall of Fame.

"I Want You Back" ranks number 104 on Rolling Stone's list of the '500 Greatest Songs of All Time'. It also ranks ninth on Rolling Stone's list of the '100 Greatest Pop Songs since 1963'. In 2020, it was ranked number 2 on Rolling Stone's list of 'The 100 Greatest Debut Singles of All Time'.

In 1995, two Rappin' 4-Tay songs—"Problems" and "A Message for Your Mind"—were featured on the Dangerous Minds soundtrack. "A Message For Your Mind" sampled "I Want You Back" by The Jackson 5.

In 2006, Pitchfork named it the second best song of the 1960s, adding that the chorus contains "possibly the best chord progression in pop music history". A June 2009 article by The Daily Telegraph called it "arguably the greatest pop record of all time". Digital Spy called the song "one of the most enduring pop singles of the sixties".

The single has been awarded 4× Platinum certification in 2026 by the British Phonographic Industry.

"I Want You Back" has long been considered one of the most sampled songs in all of hip hop music. The song has been sampled over 90 times since its release by artists including Jay-Z and The Notorious B.I.G.

== Personnel ==
Credits are adapted from Michael Jackson All The Songs and AllMusic.

- Michael Jackson – lead vocals
- Tito Jackson – vocals, backing vocals
- Jackie Jackson – vocals, backing vocals
- Jermaine Jackson – vocals, backing vocals
- Marlon Jackson – vocals, backing vocals
- Keith Washington – backing vocals
- Ludie Washington – backing vocals
- Fonce Mizell – piano
- Freddie Perren – piano
- Louis Shelton – guitar
- David T. Walker – rhythm guitar
- Wilton Felder (The Jazz Crusaders) – bass guitar
- Don Peake – guitar
- Gene Pello – drums
- Clarence McDonald – keyboards
- Joe Sample (The Jazz Crusaders) – piano
- Sandra Crouch – tambourine
- Uncredited – congas

== Charts ==
=== Weekly charts ===
Weekly chart performance for "I Want You Back"
Chart (1969–1970)	Peak position
Australia (Kent Music Report)	77
Canada (RPM) Top Singles	2
Ireland (IRMA)	6
New Zealand (Listener)	12
UK Singles (Official Charts)	2
US Billboard Hot 100	1
US Billboard Best Selling Soul Singles	1
US Cash Box	1

Chart (2009)	Peak position
Australia (ARIA)	53
France Download (SNEP)	26
Ireland (IRMA)	34
Netherlands (Single Top 100)	15
Sweden (Sverigetopplistan)	47
Switzerland (Schweizer Hitparade)	31
UK Singles (OCC)	43

Chart (2026)	Peak position
France (SNEP)	150
Global 200 (Billboard)	107

=== Year-end charts ===
Year-end chart performance for "I Want You Back"
Chart (1970)	Rank
Canada (RPM)	30
UK Singles (OCC)	32
US Billboard Hot 100	28
US Cash Box	31

== Certifications and sales ==
Certifications and sales for "I Want You Back"
Region	Certification	Certified units/sales
Denmark (IFPI Danmark)	Platinum	90,000^{‡}
Germany (BVMI)	Gold	250,000^{‡}
Italy (FIMI) sales since 2009	Gold	25,000^{‡}
Japan (RIAJ)	Gold	100,000^{*}
New Zealand (RMNZ)	4× Platinum	120,000^{‡}
Spain (Promusicae)	Platinum	60,000^{‡}
United Kingdom (BPI)	4× Platinum	2,400,000^{‡}
United States (RIAA)	Platinum	3,000,000
Summaries
Worldwide	—	6,000,000
^{‡} Sales+streaming figures based on certification alone.

== Cleopatra version ==
"I Want You Back"

Single by Cleopatra

from the album Comin' Atcha!
- Released: August 10, 1998
- Studio: Cookhouse (Minneapolis, Minnesota); The Loft (Los Angeles); RAK (London, England); Plus XXX (Paris, France)
- Length: 4:02
- Label: WEA
- Songwriters: Freddie Perren; Alphonso Mizell; Berry Gordy; Deke Richards
- Producer: Shaun LaBelle

Cleopatra singles chronology
"Life Ain't Easy" (1998)	"I Want You Back" (1998)	"A Touch of Love" (1999)

Music video
- "I Want You Back" on YouTube

English girl group Cleopatra recorded a cover version of "I Want You Back" for their 1998 debut studio album, Comin' Atcha!. It was released as the album's third single on August 10, 1998, and received mixed reviews from music critics. "I Want You Back" became the group's third and final top-five hit on the UK Singles Chart, peaking at number four and staying on the chart for 11 weeks, making it their longest-charting single along with "Cleopatra's Theme". It also charted in several other countries, reaching the top 20 in France and New Zealand.

=== Critical reception ===
British trade paper Music Week reviewed the song before its release, calling it "close-to-the-original" and giving it a "side-thumb" rating. British columnist James Masterton wrote that this cover version has "no merit whatsoever" but ultimately called the track "forgivable" due to Cleopatra's talents and worldwide popularity, referring to the single as "nothing short of a superb but faithful rendition of an all time classic song by a group with the voices to carry it off perfectly".

=== Track listings ===
UK CD1

1. "I Want You Back" – 4:02
2. "I Want You Back" (Darkchild remix) – 4:06
3. "I Want You Back" (Stepchild remix) – 4:52

UK CD2

1. "I Want You Back" – 4:02
2. "I Want You Back" (Direktorz of the Mix R+B remix) – 3:55
3. "I Want You Back" (Ordinary People club mix) – 4:40

UK 12-inch single

A1. "I Want You Back" (Darkchild remix) – 4:02
A2. "I Want You Back" (Stepchild remix) – 4:52
B1. "I Want You Back" (Direktorz of the Mix R+B remix) – 3:55
B2. "I Want You Back" (Ordinary People club mix) – 4:40

UK cassette single and European CD single

1. "I Want You Back" – 4:02
2. "I Want You Back" (Darkchild remix) – 4:06

Australian and Japanese CD single

1. "I Want You Back"
2. "I Want You Back" (Darkchild remix)
3. "I Want You Back" (Stepchild remix)
4. "I Want You Back" (Direktorz of the Mix R+B remix)
5. "I Want You Back" (Ordinary People club mix)

=== Credits and personnel ===
Credits are taken from the UK CD1 liner notes.

Studios

- Recorded at Cookhouse Recording Studios (Minneapolis, Minnesota), The Loft Studios (Los Angeles), RAK Studios (London, England), and Plus XXX Studios (Paris, France)

Personnel

- Freddie Perren – writing
- Alphonso Mizell – writing
- Berry Gordy – writing
- Deke Richards – writing
- Cleopatra Higgins – lead vocals
- Zainam Higgins – backing vocals
- Yonah Higgins – backing vocals
- Christina Higgins – additional backing vocals
- Tiara Le Macks – additional backing vocals
- 'Lil Roger Troutman Jr. – talk box
- David Barry – guitar
- Shaun LaBelle – keyboards, synthesizers, drum programming, strings, production
- Dik Shopteau – recording (Cookhouse)
- Brad Haehnel – recording (The Loft)
- Graeme Stewart – recording (RAK)
- Marcellus Fernandes – recording (Plus XXX), mixing

=== Charts ===
==== Weekly charts ====
Weekly chart performance for "I Want You Back"
Chart (1998)	Peak position
Belgium (Ultratip Bubbling Under Flanders)	6
Belgium (Ultratop 50 Wallonia)	36
Estonia (Eesti Top 20)	15
Europe (Eurochart Hot 100)	29
France (SNEP)	19
Germany (GfK)	98
Iceland (Íslenski Listinn Topp 40)	39
Ireland (IRMA)	26
Netherlands (Dutch Top 40 Tipparade)	13
Netherlands (Single Top 100)	67
New Zealand (Recorded Music NZ)	13
Scottish Singles Sales (Official Charts)	6
Sweden (Sverigetopplistan)	49
UK Singles (Official Charts)	4
UK Hip Hop/R&B (Official Charts)	2

==== Year-end charts ====
Year-end chart performance for "I Want You Back"
Chart (1998)	Position
UK Singles (OCC)	131

=== Release history ===
Release dates and formats for "I Want You Back"
Region	Date	Format(s)	Label(s)	Ref.
United Kingdom	August 10, 1998	12-inch vinyl; CD; cassette	WEA	
Japan	September 25, 1998	CD	WEA Japan	

== Victorious version ==
"I Want You Back"

Song by Victorious cast featuring Victoria Justice

from the album Victorious: Music from the Hit TV Show
- Released: August 2, 2011
- Genre: Bubblegum pop
- Length: 2:59
- Label: Nickelodeon; Columbia
- Songwriter: The Corporation
- Producer: Raphael Saadiq

A cover version of "I Want You Back" was first performed live by the Victorious cast on May 26, 2011, at Avalon Hollywood. The song then appeared in a music video featuring the Victorious cast in July 2011 on Nickelodeon. It later was featured in a one-hour Victorious special titled "Locked Up!" on July 30, 2011. The episode features Tori Vega (Victoria Justice) as she wins a free vacation for herself and her friends in a fictional country called Yerba. The trip goes wrong when Tori accidentally strikes the Yerbanian chancellor in the eye with her shoe, resulting in her being put in jail. When Tori's friends try to get her out of jail, they get locked up as well. Tori and her friends later perform "I Want You Back" for the Chancellor. The song was officially released as the eighth track on the show's debut soundtrack album Victorious: Music from the Hit TV Show on August 2, 2011. William Ruhlmann for AllMusic described the cover's genre as bubblegum pop.

=== Reception ===
Joe DeAndrea, writing for AbsolutePunk, stated that Justice and the Victorious cast perform a version of the song "which they don’t completely murder", opining that the cover shows "the intricacy of how fun the show really is". Writing for MovieWeb, Israel Olorunnisola labeled it as a "classic cover". Jessica Dawson for Common Sense Media labeled the track as one of the soundtrack's "standouts". Miranda for WKNC-FM described it as a "classic cover song with talented vocalists", mentioning that she "love[s] the energy the cast brings to this track". She declared that Justice's voice "dominates the track". In a negative review, Ruhlmann opined that the cover "demonstrates that bubblegum pop hasn't changed much in 40 years".

=== Commercial performance ===
Commercially, the song debuted and peaked at number eight on the US Billboard Bubbling Under Hot 100 chart dated August 20, 2011, lasting one week. The track also peaked at number one on the US Kid Digital Song Sales chart and number 38 on the US Pop Digital Song Sales chart. The cover ranked at number 24 on the 2011 Kid Digital Song Sales year-end list.

=== Charts ===
==== Weekly charts ====
Weekly chart performance for "I Want You Back"
Chart (2011)	Peak position
US Bubbling Under Hot 100 (Billboard)	8
US Kid Digital Song Sales (Billboard)	1
US Pop Digital Song Sales (Billboard)	38

==== Year-end charts ====
Year-end chart performance for "I Want You Back"
Chart (2011)	Position
US Kid Digital Song Sales (Billboard)	24

== Twice version ==
"I Want You Back"

Single by Twice

from the album BDZ
- Released: June 15, 2018
- Length: 3:23
- Label: Warner Music Japan

Twice singles chronology
"Wake Me Up" (2018)	"I Want You Back" (2018)	"Dance the Night Away" (2018)

Music video
- "I Want You Back" on YouTube

A cover of "I Want You Back" by South Korean girl group Twice was released by Warner Music Japan on June 15, 2018, as a digital single. The song was used as the theme song to the 2018 live-action film adaptation for Sensei Kunshu. A second version of the music video featuring the cast of the film dancing with Twice was released on June 26, 2018.

=== Charts ===
Weekly chart performance for "I Want You Back"
Chart (2018)	Peak position
Japan Hot 100 (Billboard)	12
Japan Digital Singles (Oricon)	7
US World Digital Song Sales (Billboard)	20

=== Certifications ===
Streaming certifications for "I Want You Back"
Region	Certification	Certified units/sales
Japan (RIAJ)	Gold	50,000,000^{†}
^{†} Streaming-only figures based on certification alone.
