= Steppin' Out (Cleopatra album) =

- European cover

Studio album by Cleopatra
- Released: 21 June 2000
- Recorded: 1999–2000
- Genres: Pop; R&B
- Length: 52:59
- Labels: WEA; Maverick
- Producers: Jam & Lewis; Stargate; Dallas Austin; Daryl Simmons

Cleopatra chronology
Comin' Atcha! (1998)	Steppin' Out (2000)

Singles from Steppin' Out
- 1. "Come and Get Me" Released: 17 July 2000; 2. "U Got It" Released: 25 July 2000 (US); 3. "Yes, This Party's Going Right" Released: 12 October 2000 (Japan)

Alternative cover
- US and Japanese cover

Steppin' Out is the second studio album by British girl group Cleopatra, released on 21 June 2000 in Japan by Warner Music Japan. It was later released 22 August 2000 by WEA in the majority of the world and Maverick Records in the United States.

== Overview ==
Cleo Higgins served was the main songwriter on the album, which was also co-written by her bandmates. As well the album features production from Jimmy Jam and Terry Lewis, Dallas Austin and Stargate.

== Recording and production ==
After the success of their debut Comin' Atcha! and gaining attention in the US, including a Top 40 entry for "Cleopatra's Theme", the girls entered the studio to start work on their then-untitled second album. The girls decided the direction of this album would be R&B and not pop like their first album. Cleo again was the main songwriter, having penned the entire first album with her sister and bandmates credited as co-writers.

Employing a variety of production teams including Cutfather & Joe, Jimmy Jam and Terry Lewis, Stargate and bass guitarist and background vocalist Debra Killings, the album was recorded across the US and UK as well as in Norway and Denmark.

== Release ==
Professional ratings
Review scores
Source	Rating
AllMusic	3/5 stars
Billboard	(favourable)
MTV	(favourable)
PopMatters	(favourable)
Vibe	(favourable)

Upon release, the album earned favourable reviews from critics. The lead single from the album, "Come and Get Me", reached No. 29 on the UK Singles Chart.

The album's cover art was done by photography duo Markus and Indrani, best known for their work with Mariah Carey and Beyoncé.

=== Singles ===
"Come and Get Me" was released as the album's lead single in the UK on 17 July 2000. The single charted at only number 29 on the UK singles chart.

"U Got It" served as the album's lead single in the United States, being serviced to contemporary and rhythmic contemporary radio stations on 25 July 2000. The song is an R&B-flavored pop track with "lush" guitar samples.

"Yes, This Party's Going Right" was released in Japan alongside the album's special edition on 12 October 2000.

== Track listing ==
No.	Title	Length
1.	"Press Here to Start"	3:49
2.	"Come and Get Me"	3:36
3.	"U Got It"	3:24
4.	"Sweat Me"	4:52
5.	"Who's Your Woman"	5:06
6.	"Nobody Said"	5:11
7.	"Number One Fan"	3:29
8.	"Voo-Doo"	4:15
9.	"Yes, This Party's Going Right"	4:42
10.	"You Can't Be in My Life"	3:29
11.	"Bingo My Love"	3:44
12.	"Questions and Jealousy"	4:01
13.	"Take Me Now (Stop, Stop...)"	3:21
Total length:		52:59

=== US/Japan version ===
No.	Title	Length
1.	"Press Here to Start"
2.	"U Got It"
3.	"Take Me Now (Stop, Stop...)"
4.	"Sweat Me"
5.	"Nobody Said"
6.	"Come and Get Me"
7.	"Questions and Jealousy"
8.	"Who's Your Woman"
9.	"Bingo My Love"
10.	"Voo-Doo"
11.	"Yes, This Party's Going Right"

Japan release only
No.	Title	Length
12.	"All Talk No Action"

== Credits ==
- Cleopatra Higgins: Lead vocals
- Zainam Higgins: Backing vocals
- Yonah Higgins: Backing vocals
- Christine Higgins: Backing vocals
- Jimmy Jam: Arranger, producer
- Terry Lewis: Arranger, producer
- Debra Killings: Producer
- Daryl Simmons: Keyboards, programming, producer, vocals (Background)
- Che Guevara: Producer
- Markus Klinko and Indrani: Photography
- Kenneth Hayes: Producer
- Xavier Smith: Assistant engineer
- Ivy Skoff: Production coordination
- Bradley Yost: Assistant engineer
- James Poyser: Producer
- Warren Riker: Mixing
- Kim Biggs: Package design
- Joe Belmaati Keyboards, programming
- Michael Norfleet: Keyboards, programming
- Andrea Wright: Engineer
- Lee Monteverde: Engineer
- Vernon Mungo: Assistant engineer
- Bradley Spalter: Keyboards, programming
- David Harlan: Package design
- Tue Roh: Fender Rhodes
- Stargate: Producer
- Amy Foster: Creative director
- Tim Scrafton: Producer
- Adam Kagan: Keyboards, engineer, programming
- John Horesco IV: Engineer, mixing
- Dorian Daniels: Bass, keyboards, programming
- Leslie Brathwaite: Mixing
- Rob Chiarelli: Mixing
- Steve Hodge: Engineer, mixing
- Kevin Lively: Assistant engineer
