= Life Ain't Easy =

1998 single by Cleopatra

Single by Cleopatra

from the album Comin' Atcha!
- Released: 4 May 1998
- Studio: Nomad (California, US); Marcus, Metropolis (London, England)
- Genre: Pop
- Length: 3:20
- Label: WEA
- Composers: Cleopatra Higgins; Zainam Higgins; Yonah Higgins; Cziz Hall; Paul Eastman; Steve Christian
- Lyricist: Cleopatra Higgins
- Producers: Dennis Charles; Ronnie Wilson

Cleopatra singles chronology
| "Cleopatra's Theme" (1998) | "Life Ain't Easy" (1998) | "I Want You Back" (1998) |

Music video
- "Life Ain't Easy" on YouTube

"Life Ain't Easy" is a pop song by British girl group Cleopatra. Lead vocalist Cleopatra Higgins wrote the lyrics alone and composed the music with her sisters, Zainam and Yonah Higgins, along with Cziz Hall, Paul Eastman, Steve Christian. Produced by Dennis Charles and Ronnie Wilson, the song was included as the second track on Cleopatra's debut studio album, Comin' Atcha! (1998). "Life Ain't Easy" was released as the album's second single on 4 May 1998, reaching number four on the UK Singles Chart. It also charted in several other countries, entering the top 10 in New Zealand and the top 20 in Ireland.

== Critical reception ==
British trade paper Music Week reviewed "Life Ain't Easy" on 25 April 1998, noting that the song is less "down your throat" than Cleopatra's debut single, "Cleopatra's Theme", but calling it "equally catchy", as well as a combination of the Jackson 5, early New Edition, and Hanson. British columnist James Masterton praised the song's vocal styles and harmonies. Billboard magazine reviewed the song in September 1998, writing that "Life Ain't Easy" should have been Cleopatra's debut US single and praising its harmonies, hooks, and lyrics. Billboard also compared the track to those by Hanson, writing, "'Life Ain't Easy' is a remarkably sage, thought-provoking song, performed with a contagious youthful energy that is mildly reminiscent of Hanson's 'Mmmbop'—but with an ample dose of silky soul."

== Chart performance ==
On 10 May 1998, "Life Ain't Easy" debuted at its peak of number four on the UK Singles Chart, becoming Cleopatra's second top-five hit in the UK, and stayed in the top 100 for nine weeks. It also appeared on the UK R&B Singles Chart, peaking at number three the same week. At the end of 1998, the song finished at number 113 on the UK year-end chart. In Ireland, the song peaked at number 20 on the Irish Singles Chart and remained in the top 30 for five weeks. Across the rest of Europe, the single peaked at number 30 in Iceland, number 37 in the Netherlands, and number 72 in Germany. On the Eurochart Hot 100, the song reached number 26 during its second week on the chart.

Outside Europe, "Life Ain't Easy" entered the top 40 in Australia, peaking at number 37 on the ARIA Singles Chart in August 1998 and logging five weeks in the top 50. The song charted higher in New Zealand, where it peaked at number seven on the RIANZ Singles Chart and charted for 13 weeks, ending the year as New Zealand's 50th-most-successful single. In the United States, the song stalled at number 81 on the Billboard Hot 100 chart in November 1998. It failed to appear on the Billboard Hot R&B Singles chart but peaked at number 64 on the Billboard Hot R&B Singles Sales chart in January 1999.

== Track listings ==
The Comin' Atcha! album teaser consists of "Touch of Love", "What You Gonna Do Boy?", "Don't Suffer in Silence", "I Want You Back", "Cleopatra's Theme", and "The Bird Song".

UK CD1

1. "Life Ain't Easy" (radio edit) – 3:18
2. "Life Ain't Easy" (Brooklyn Funk R&B mix) – 5:04
3. "Life Ain't Easy" (Direktorz Supreme Soul mix) – 5:28
4. "Life Ain't Easy" (Booker T's Soul Inside mix) – 5:37
5. "Life Ain't Easy" (Artful Dodger's Artful Gospel mix) – 4:56

UK CD2

1. "Life Ain't Easy" (radio edit) – 3:18
2. "Life Ain't Easy" (Brooklyn club mix) – 5:36
3. "Life Ain't Easy" (Full Crew mix) – 3:36
4. Comin' Atcha! album teaser – 3:56

UK cassette single and European CD single

1. "Life Ain't Easy" (radio edit) – 3:18
2. "Life Ain't Easy" (Brooklyn Funk R&B mix) – 5:04

Australian CD single

1. "Life Ain't Easy" (radio edit) – 3:18
2. "Life Ain't Easy" (Brooklyn Funk R&B mix) – 5:04
3. "Life Ain't Easy" (Direktorz Supreme Soul mix) – 5:28
4. "Life Ain't Easy" (Booker T's Soul Inside mix) – 5:37
5. "Life Ain't Easy" (Artful Dodger's Artful Gospel mix) – 4:58
6. "Cleopatra's Theme" (radio edit) – 3:53

US CD and cassette single

1. "Life Ain't Easy" (album version) – 3:20
2. "Life Ain't Easy" (Direktorz Supreme Soul mix) – 5:28

US maxi-CD single

1. "Life Ain't Easy" (Direktorz Supreme Soul mix) – 5:28
2. "Life Ain't Easy" (Artful Dodger's mix) – 4:59
3. "Life Ain't Easy" (Booker T's Soul Inside mix) – 5:31
4. "Life Ain't Easy" (album version) – 3:17
- A 12-inch single was also released in the US, with the album version moved to track two.

Japanese CD single

1. "Life Ain't Easy" (radio edit)
2. "Life Ain't Easy" (Brooklyn Funk R&B mix)
3. "Life Ain't Easy" (Full Crew mix)
4. "Life Ain't Easy" (Booker T's Soul Inside mix)
5. "Life Ain't Easy" (Artful Dodger's Artful Gospel mix)
6. "Life Ain't Easy" (Direktorz Supreme Soul mix)
7. "Life Ain't Easy" (Brooklyn club mix)
8. "Cleopatra's Theme" (radio edit)
9. "Cleopatra's Theme" (US club mix)
10. "Cleopatra's Theme" (US club instrumental)

== Credits and personnel ==
Credits are taken from the Comin' Atcha! album booklet.

Studios

- Recorded at Nomad Studios (California, US), Marcus Studios, and Metropolis Studios (London, England)
- Mixed at Olympic Studios (London, England)

Personnel

- Cleopatra Higgins – lyrics, music, lead vocals, arrangement
- Zainam Higgins – music, backing vocals, arrangement
- Yonah Higgins – music, backing vocals, arrangement
- Cziz Hall – music, arrangement
- Paul Eastman – music, arrangement
- Steve Christian – music, arrangement
- Christine Higgins – additional backing vocals
- Tyndale Thomas – gospel vocals
- Cadria Thomas – gospel vocals
- Andy Williams – gospel vocals
- Yvonne Sheldon – gospel vocals
- David Phillips – additional keyboards
- Dennis Charles – production
- Ronnie Wilson – production
- Sam Noel – additional programming and eningeering
- Steve "Barney" Chase – mix engineering

== Charts ==
=== Weekly charts ===
| Chart (1998) | Peak position |
|---|---|
| Australia (ARIA) | 37 |
| Belgium (Ultratip Bubbling Under Flanders) | 7 |
| Europe (Eurochart Hot 100) | 26 |
| Germany (GfK) | 72 |
| Iceland (Íslenski Listinn Topp 40) | 30 |
| Ireland (IRMA) | 20 |
| Netherlands (Dutch Top 40) | 37 |
| Netherlands (Single Top 100) | 52 |
| New Zealand (Recorded Music NZ) | 7 |
| Scotland Singles (Official Charts) | 7 |
| UK Singles (Official Charts) | 4 |
| UK Hip Hop/R&B (Official Charts) | 3 |
| UK Airplay (Music Week) | 23 |
| US Billboard Hot 100 | 81 |
| US Hot R&B Singles Sales (Billboard) | 64 |

=== Year-end charts ===
| Chart (1998) | Position |
|---|---|
| New Zealand (RIANZ) | 50 |
| UK Singles (OCC) | 113 |

== Release history ==
| Region | Date | Format(s) | Label(s) | Ref. |
|---|---|---|---|---|
| United Kingdom | 4 May 1998 | CD; cassette | WEA | |
| Japan | 15 January 1999 | CD | WEA Japan | |
