= Comin' Atcha! (album) =

Studio album by Cleopatra
- Released: 30 June 1998 (UK)
- Genre: Soul; pop; funk; dance-pop; R&B
- Length: 47:08
- Label: WEA; Maverick

Cleopatra chronology
Comin' Atcha! (1998)	Steppin' Out (2000)

Singles from Comin' Atcha!
- 1. "Cleopatra's Theme" Released: 2 February 1998; 2. "Life Ain't Easy" Released: 4 May 1998; 3. "I Want You Back" Released: 10 August 1998; 4. "A Touch of Love" Released: 22 February 1999

Professional ratings
Review scores
Source	Rating
AllMusic	3/5 stars
Billboard	(favourable)
Daily Mirror	8/10
The Daily Telegraph	(favourable)
Entertainment Weekly	B+
People	(favourable)

Comin' Atcha! is the debut album by British girl group Cleopatra, released on 30 June 1998 by WEA. The album reached number 20 on the UK Albums Chart and has been certified Silver in the UK by the BPI. From the album came the singles "Cleopatra's Theme", "Life Ain't Easy", "A Touch of Love" and a cover of The Jackson 5's "I Want You Back" titled 'Don't Suffer in Silence'.

On 28 December 2004, Comin' Atcha! was digitally reissued.

== Writing ==
The album was largely written by lead singer Cleo Higgins, who had written some of the songs while as young as 9 years old. It was recorded when Cleo was only 14 years old. When the original demos were recorded they were R&B and soul records which were later remixed into pop songs. Cleo often wrote about personal experiences or issues she felt she needed to address. On the track "A Touch of Love", Cleo goes into her whistle register, hitting F#6.

== Impact ==
Their debut single "Cleopatra's Theme" entered the UK Singles Chart at number 3, giving Cleopatra their first Top 5 hit single.

The next two singles, "Life Ain't Easy" and a cover of The Jackson 5's classic hit "I Want You Back", followed the same success, heading into the Top 5, gaining the girls Brit Awards and MOBO Awards nominations. They performed at the 1999 Brit Awards alongside Steps, Tina Cousins, B*Witched and Billie Piper and were also nominated for Best British Newcomer. In 1998 Madonna signed Cleopatra to her Maverick label and introduced them to the United States at Nickelodeon's 11th Annual Kids' Choice Awards, where they performed their debut single, "Cleopatra's Theme". It was released shortly afterwards and reached number 26 on the Billboard Hot 100 chart, and number 16 in the US Hot R&B/Hip-Hop Songs chart. The video reached number 4 on the TRL Top 10 countdown. Comin' Atcha sold over 300,000 copies in the US and entered the top 30 there in July 1998.

== Track listing ==
No.	Title	Length
1.	"Cleopatra's Theme"	4:09
2.	"Life Ain't Easy"	3:20
3.	"Don't Suffer in Silence"	3:56
4.	"A Touch of Love"	5:08
5.	"The Bird Song"	4:51
6.	"Thinking About You"	4:08
7.	"What You Gonna Do Boy"	5:01
8.	"The World We Live In"	5:36
9.	"Dying Rose"	3:42
10.	"Two Timer"	4:35
11.	"I Want You Back"	4:02

Japanese bonus tracks

No.	Title	Length
12.	"We Haven't Finished Yet"	4:16
13.	"Bird Song" (live version)	4:59

== Credits ==
- Cleo Higgins – lead vocals, arranger
- Yonah Higgins – backing vocals
- Zainam Higgins – backing vocals
- Christine Higgins – backing vocals
- Shaun LaBelle – synthesizer, bass, drum programming, producer, keyboards, strings
- Steve Menzies – arranger
- Harry Morgan – percussion, piano
- Dik Shopteau – engineer
- Roger Troutman – backing vocals, guitar, keyboards, talk box
- Allee Willis – arranger
- Clem Clempson – guitar
- Brad Haehnel – engineer
- Ronnie Wilson – producer, mixing
- Kenneth Hayes – arranger
- Niven Garland – engineer
- Reggie C. Young – horn
- Marcellus Fernandes – mixing, mixing engineer
- Errol Walters – executive producer
- Milton McDonald – guitar
- Paul Eastman – arranger
- Cziz Hall – arranger
- Sinclair Palmer – arranger
- Tim Scrafton – arranger
- Damien Mendis – multi instruments, mixing, producer
- Sam Noel – programming, remixing, engineer
- Yvonne Sheldon – vocals
- Graeme Stewart – engineer
- Steve Christian – arranger
- Michael "Mickey D" Davis – executive producer
- Amichi Agoua – bass
- Big Ears – strings, Synclavier technician
- Stuart Bradbury – multi instruments
- Kadria Thomas – vocals
- Tyndale Thomas – vocals
- Dennis Charles – producer, mixing
- Barney Chase – remixing
- Brad Heshnel – engineer
- Dave Phillips – piano, keyboards, programming
- Kevin Armstrong – guitar
- David Barry – guitar
- Gary Bias – horn
- Ray Brown – horn
- Stephen Chase – mixing
- Renny Hill – engineer
- Andy Williams – vocals
- Maurice White – arranger

== Charts ==
Chart (1998)	Peak position
Australian Albums (ARIA Charts)	78
German Albums (Offizielle Top 100)	84
New Zealand Albums (RMNZ)	34
Scottish Albums (OCC)	42
UK Albums (OCC)	20
UK R&B Albums (OCC)	3
US Billboard 200	109
US Heatseekers Albums (Billboard)	2

== Certifications ==
Region	Certification	Certified units/sales
United Kingdom (BPI)	Silver	60,000^{^}
^{^} Shipments figures based on certification alone.
