= That's Life (Russell Watson album) =

Studio album by Russell Watson
- Released: 13 March 2007
- Recorded: 2006–2007
- Genre: Crossover
- Label: Decca
- Producer: Simon Franglen

Russell Watson chronology
The Ultimate Collection (2006)	That's Life (2007)	People Get Ready (2008)

Professional ratings
Review scores
Source	Rating
AllMusic	3.5/5 stars

That's Life is a 2007 album by British tenor Russell Watson.

== Track listing ==
1. "That's Life" (Kelly Gordon, Dean Kay) - 3:12
2. "Strangers in the Night" (Bert Kaempfert, Charlie Singleton, Eddie Snyder) - 4:47
3. "When I Fall in Love" (Edward Heyman, Victor Young) - 3:45
4. "You Don't Know Me" (Eddy Arnold, Cindy Walker) - 3:18
5. "You Make Me Feel So Young" (Mack Gordon, Joseph Myrow)- 3:01
6. "Born Free" (John Barry, Don Black) - 2:56
7. "Summer Wind" (Hans Bradtke, Henry Mayer, Johnny Mercer) - 3:35
8. "I Left My Heart in San Francisco" (George Cory, Douglas Cross)- 3:43
9. "Let There Be Love" (Ian Grant, Lionel Rand) - 3:18
10. "Smile" (Charlie Chaplin, John Turner, Geoffrey Parsons) - 4:08
11. "It Was a Very Good Year" (Ervin Drake) - 5:48
12. "To All the Girls I've Loved Before" (with Alexander O'Neal) (Hal David, Albert Hammond) - 3:52

This album was produced by British record producer, Simon Franglen.

== Charts ==
=== Weekly charts ===
Chart (2007)	Peak position
Scottish Albums (OCC)	5
UK Albums (OCC)	4

=== Year-end charts ===
Chart (2007)	Position
UK Albums (OCC)	101
