= Encore (Russell Watson album) =

Studio album by Russell Watson
- Released: October 2001
- Recorded: 2001–2002
- Genre: Crossover
- Label: Decca
- Producer: Nick Patrick; Russell Watson

Russell Watson chronology
The Voice (2000)	Encore (2001)	Reprise (2002)

Encore, released in October 2001, is the second album by British tenor Russell Watson. This album peaked at No. 1 on the US Billboard Classical Albums Chart on 18 October 2002.

== Critical reception ==
The AllMusic review of Encore concludes with, "It's important to note that Watson did begin his career as a pop singer, but no one has ever straddled the great stylistic divide quite so successfully as he does on ENCORE."

== Track listing ==
US Version
No.	Title	Writer(s)	Length
1.	"Va, pensiero"	Giuseppe Verdi	4:05
2.	"Volare"	Domenico Modugno; Franco Migliacci	3:47
3.	"Is Nothing Sacred"	Jim Steinman; Don Black	5:58
4.	"The Prayer" (with Lulu)	David Foster; Carole Bayer Sager; Tony Renis; Alberto Testa	4:28
5.	"'O sole mio"	Eduardo Di Capua; Giovanni Capurro; Alfredo Mazzucchi	3:27
6.	"Ave Maria"	Johann Sebastian Bach; Charles Gounod	5:02
7.	"Mattinata"	Ruggero Leoncavallo	2:07
8.	"I Just Don't Know How I Got By"	Diane Warren	3:36
9.	"You Are So Beautiful"	Billy Preston; Bruce Fisher	2:44
10.	"Somewhere"	Leonard Bernstein; Stephen Sondheim	5:17
11.	"Che Gelida Manina"	Giacomo Puccini; Luigi Illica; Giuseppe Giacosa	4:34
12.	"E Lucevan Le Stelle"	Giacomo Puccini; Luigi Illica; Giuseppe Giacosa	2:51
13.	"Magic of Love" (with Lionel Richie)	Lionel Richie; Walter Afanasieff; Marilyn Bergman; Alan Bergman	4:31
14.	"Bohemian Rhapsody"	Freddie Mercury	6:35
15.	"Celeste Aida"	Giuseppe Verdi	4:21
16.	"Where My Heart Will Take Me (Theme From Star Trek: Enterprise)"	Diane Warren	3:59
Total length:			67:22

UK Version
No.	Title	Writer(s)	Length
1.	"Va, pensiero"	Giuseppe Verdi	4:05
2.	"Volare"	Domenico Modugno; Franco Migliacci	3:47
3.	"The Prayer" (with Lulu)	David Foster; Carole Bayer Sager; Tony Renis; Alberto Testa	4:28
4.	"'O Sole Mio"	Eduardo Di Capua; Giovanni Capurro; Alfredo Mazzucchi	3:27
5.	"Ave Maria"	Johann Sebastian Bach; Charles Gounod	5:02
6.	"Pelagia's Song (Captain Corelli's Mandolin)"	Stephen Warbeck	3:48
7.	"Mattinata"	Ruggero Leoncavallo	2:07
8.	"You Are So Beautiful"	Billy Preston; Bruce Fisher	2:44
9.	"Somewhere"	Leonard Bernstein; Stephen Sondheim	5:17
10.	"Che Gelida Manina"	Giacomo Puccini; Luigi Illica; Giuseppe Giacosa	4:34
11.	"E Lucevan Le Stelle"	Giacomo Puccini; Luigi Illica; Giuseppe Giacosa	2:51
12.	"Magic of Love" (with Lionel Richie)	Lionel Richie; Walter Afanasieff; Marilyn Bergman; Alan Bergman	4:31
13.	"Catch the Tears"	Diane Warren	4:48
14.	"Lost In The Snow"	Katrina Beath; Alfonso Esposito; Alistair Gordon; Steve Pigott; Russell Watson	4:11
15.	"Celeste Aida"	Giuseppe Verdi	4:21
16.	"Where My Heart Will Take Me (Theme From Star Trek: Enterprise)"	Diane Warren	3:59
Total length:			64:00

== Musicians ==
- Russell Watson – vocals (Lead), Vocals (Background)
- James Banbury – Cello
- Jay Berliner – guitar
- Jeff Bova – keyboards
- Paul "Wix" Wickens – keyboards
- Neil Jason – bass
- Bashiri Johnson – percussion
- Steve Butler – vocals (Background)
- Rita Campbell – vocals (Background)
- Alistair Gordon – vocals (Background)
- Judith Abbott – vocals (Background)
- Sue Quin – vocals (Background)
- Laurence Cottle – guitar
- John McCurry – guitar
- John Parricelli – guitar
- Richard Cottle – keyboards, Tin Whistle
- Andy Findon – Whistle (Human)
- Lulu – Duet Vocals on "The Prayer"
- Lionel Richie – Duet Vocals on "Magic of Love"
- John Lubbock – Conductor

== Production ==
- Leon Zervos – Mastering
- Nick Patrick – arranger, producer
- Russell Watson – producer
- Philip Bodger – mixing
- Jerry Clifford – Photography
- Andrew Southam – Photography, Tray Card
- Rory Johnston – Production Executive
- David Maurice – editing, mixing, programming
- Mark Millington – Art Direction, Design, Photography
- Mark Smith – editing, programming
- Giles Stanley – production coordination
- Bill Borrows – Liner Notes

Track information and credits adapted from Discogs and AllMusic, then verified from the album's liner notes.

== Charts ==
=== Weekly charts ===
Chart (2001–2002)	Peak position
Australian Albums (ARIA)	15
Irish Albums (IRMA)	27
New Zealand Albums (RMNZ)	1
Scottish Albums (OCC)	5
UK Albums (OCC)	6
US Billboard 200	114
US Top Classical Albums (Billboard)	1

=== Year-end charts ===
Chart (2001)	Position
UK Albums (OCC)	18
Chart (2002)	Position
New Zealand Albums (RMNZ)	6
UK Albums (OCC)	130

== Certifications ==
Region	Certification	Certified units/sales
United Kingdom (BPI)	2× Platinum	600,000^{^}
^{^} Shipments figures based on certification alone.
