= Cleopatra's Theme =

1998 single by Cleopatra

Single by Cleopatra

from the album Comin' Atcha!
- Released: 2 February 1998
- Length: 4:09 (album version); 3:51 (radio edit)
- Label: WEA
- Songwriters: Cleopatra Madonna Higgins; Kenny Hayes; Tim Scrafton
- Producers: Damien Mendis; Stuart Bradbury

Cleopatra singles chronology
"Cleopatra's Theme" (1998)	"Life Ain't Easy" (1998)

"Cleopatra's Theme" is a song by British R&B girl group Cleopatra from their first album, Comin' Atcha! (1998). Released by WEA as the group's debut single, it reached number three on the UK Singles Chart and number 26 on the US Billboard Hot 100. It was their only song to reach the top 40 in the United States, where Cleopatra promoted the song by appearing on several children's programming blocks.

== Critical reception ==
Larry Flick from Billboard wrote, "Are ya ready for the female equivalent of Hanson? This UK teen trio has already won the ardent approval of kids throughout much of Europe on the strength of a light-funk groove, a candy-sweet chorus, and charmingly girlish harmonies. Precocious lead singer Cleopatra Higgins has the makings of a baby diva, as she vamps with a surprisingly soulful hand." He added further, "Early reaction from top 40 programmers here hints that this adorable sister act's music will be on the lips of mall America within seconds. "Cleopatra's Theme" is just one of numerous tasty treats to be discovered on the forthcoming full-length debut, Comin' Atcha! You'll be hearing just about all of 'em soon enough."

Chuck Campbell from Knoxville News Sentinel said, "Granted, this song is infectious, especially when the girls' voices sweep together into the light R&B hook." A reviewer from Music Week gave "Cleopatra's Theme" four out of five, adding, "Take three currently successful music trends — all-girl groups, teenage exuberance and R&B — combine in one neat package and provide an infectious, radio-friendly debut single for this attractive trio. They can't fail." Ian Hyland from Sunday Mirror gave it nine out of ten, concluding, "This group of hip-hopping Manchester teens are some serious soul divas in the making. Keep a look out."

== Music video ==
The music video for the song, directed by Max & Daria consists of the girls singing and dancing in their room, after being told by their mother to turn the television off. It received airplay on U.S. channels, such as Disney Channel, Nickelodeon, MTV, and BET.

== Track listings ==
- UK, European, Australian, and Japanese CD single
1. "Cleopatra's Theme" (radio edit) – 3:51
2. "Cleopatra's Theme" (D+A mix) – 4:17
3. "Cleopatra's Theme" (Brooklyn Funk R&B mix) – 5:11
4. "Cleopatra's Theme" (Brooklyn Funk club mix) – 6:08
5. "Cleopatra's Theme" (Booker T's Mass Fusion Lick) – 5:52
- UK cassette single and US CD single
1. "Cleopatra's Theme" (radio edit) – 3:51
2. "Cleopatra's Theme" (D+A mix) – 4:17

== Charts ==
=== Weekly charts ===
Chart (1998)	Peak position
Australia (ARIA)	25
Belgium (Ultratop 50 Flanders)	14
Belgium (Ultratop 50 Wallonia)	8
Estonia (Eesti Top 20)	14
Europe (European Hot 100 Singles)	26
France (SNEP)	47
Germany (GfK)	46
Ireland (IRMA)	11
Netherlands (Dutch Top 40)	8
Netherlands (Single Top 100)	10
New Zealand (Recorded Music NZ)	6
Scotland Singles (OCC)	7
Sweden (Sverigetopplistan)	21
Switzerland (Schweizer Hitparade)	41
UK Singles (OCC)	3
UK Hip Hop/R&B (OCC)	1
US Billboard Hot 100	26
US Hot R&B/Hip-Hop Songs (Billboard)	51

=== Year-end charts ===
Chart (1998)	Position
Belgium (Ultratop 50 Flanders)	99
Belgium (Ultratop 50 Wallonia)	60
Netherlands (Dutch Top 40)	94
New Zealand (RIANZ)	49
UK Singles (OCC)	101

== Certifications ==
Region	Certification	Certified units/sales
Belgium (BRMA)	Gold	25,000^{*}
United Kingdom (BPI)	Silver	200,000^{‡}
^{*} Sales figures based on certification alone.^{‡} Sales+streaming figures based on certification alone.

== Release history ==
Region	Date	Format(s)	Label(s)	Ref.
United Kingdom	2 February 1998	CD; cassette	WEA	
United States	2 June 1998	Rhythmic contemporary; contemporary hit radio	Warner Bros.; Maverick	
Japan	25 June 1998	CD	WEA Japan	
