= Comin' Atcha! (TV series) =

- Starring: Cleopatra
- Country of origin: United Kingdom
- Original language: English
- No. of series: 2
- No. of episodes: 14

Production
- Running time: 30 minutes
- Production company: Initial

Original release
- Network: ITV (CITV)
- Release: 5 February 1999 – 15 February 2000

Comin' Atcha! was a British television series first broadcast on the children's television channel CITV.

In 1998 CITV premiered a one-hour Christmas special featuring the musical group Cleopatra, which went on to become a sitcom series. The show was twenty minutes per episode and followed the girls' lives on tour and at home with their family. The girls' mother and younger sister were featured as themselves. The show ran for two seasons.

== Cast ==
- Zainam Higgins - herself
- Cleo Higgins - herself
- Yonah Higgins - herself
- Christine Higgins - herself
- Terri Higgins - herself
- Matthew Cottle - Lawrence
- Ozzie Yue - Mr Lee
- Roger Griffiths - Uncle Rudi (series 2)
- Simon Schatzberger - Morris (series 2)
