= You're Lucky I Love You =

Single by Susan Ashton

from the album Closer
- B-side: "Think of Me"
- Released: May 29, 1999
- Genre: Country
- Length: 3:31
- Label: Capitol Nashville
- Songwriter(s): Neil Thrasher, Marla Cannon-Goodman
- Producer(s): Emory Gordy Jr.

Susan Ashton singles chronology
"Faith of the Heart" (1999)	"You're Lucky I Love You" (1999)	"She Is" (1999)

"You're Lucky I Love You" is a song recorded by American country music artist Susan Ashton. It was released in May 1999 as the second single from the album Closer. The song reached No. 37 on the Billboard Hot Country Singles & Tracks chart. The song was written by Neil Thrasher and Marla Cannon-Goodman.

== Chart performance ==
Chart (1999)	Peak position
US Hot Country Songs (Billboard)	37
Canadian RPM Country Tracks	52
