= Faith of the Heart =

Single by Rod Stewart written by Diane Warren

- United States single cover

Single by Rod Stewart

from the album Patch Adams: Original Motion Picture Soundtrack
- B-side: Patch Adams "Main Title"
- Released: 1999
- Recorded: 1998
- Genre: Pop rock
- Length: 4:17
- Label: Universal
- Songwriter: Diane Warren
- Producer: Guy Roche

Rod Stewart singles chronology
"When We Were the New Boys" (1998)	"Faith of the Heart" (1999)	"Run Back Into Your Arms" (2000)

Audio
- "Faith of the Heart" by Rod Stewart on YouTube

"Faith of the Heart" is a song written by Diane Warren and performed by Rod Stewart for the soundtrack to the 1998 film Patch Adams. Stewart's version charted at number 3 on the US Adult Contemporary chart and number 60 on the UK Singles Chart. It was warmly received by critics. The song was later covered in 1999 by Susan Ashton for her album Closer and released as her first single in the country music genre.

It was also recorded by English tenor Russell Watson as "Where My Heart Will Take Me" for use as the opening theme to the 2001 television series Star Trek: Enterprise.

== Development and release ==
"Faith of the Heart" appeared on the soundtrack to the 1998 film Patch Adams. It was released on the Universal Records label and produced by Guy Roche. The B-side of the release was the main title theme to the film. The song was released less than a month after Rod Stewart's separation from his wife Rachel Hunter.

== Reception ==
The song was most successful in the Billboard Adult Contemporary within the United States, reaching third place in the chart. The performance of the single placed it in twentieth spot on the Billboard Adult Contemporary chart for the year end 1999.

William Ruhlmann at the website Allmusic described "Faith of the Heart" as a power ballad which is "a standard effort for its genre". Chuck Taylor reviewed the song for Billboard and said that it was one of Stewart's "more enjoyable performances in the last couple of years", and thought that the song could have just as easily been sung by Celine Dion or LeAnn Rimes.

== Susan Ashton version ==
"Faith of the Heart"

Single by Susan Ashton

from the album Closer
- Released: February 23, 1999
- Genre: Country music
- Length: 4:17
- Label: Capitol Nashville
- Songwriter: Diane Warren
- Producer: Emory Gordy Jr.

Susan Ashton singles chronology
"You Move Me" (1996)	"Faith of the Heart" (1999)	"You're Lucky I Love You" (1999)

Susan Ashton was previously known for being a singer of contemporary Christian music, but decided to move into the country music genre after signing a deal with Columbia Records. She developed the album Closer, which featured a cover of the Rod Stewart single "Faith of the Heart". It was the first release from the album, but was not as successful as the following single, "You're Lucky I Love You". She considered between 800 and 1000 songs to appear on the album, reducing the number down to ten.

=== Reception ===
Tim Anderson, writing in his Country Beat column for Yakima Herald-Republic described Susan Ashton's "Faith of the Heart" as "a definite winner" but that it "did take a couple listens to really hook" him. The release of the single by Ashton was predicted by Brian Mansfield for USA Today as being the first of a career that would increase sales for the country music genre following Aston's previous success with Christian music.

== Russell Watson version ==
"Where My Heart Will Take Me"

Song by Russell Watson

from the album Encore
- Released: 29 October 2001
- Recorded: 2001
- Genre: Pop rock
- Length: 4:09
- Label: Decca
- Songwriter: Diane Warren
- Producer: Nick Patrick

Audio
- "Where My Heart Will Take Me" by Russell Watson on YouTube

"Where My Heart Will Take Me" is a reworked version of "Faith of the Heart" which was performed by English tenor Russell Watson as the theme song to the 2001 television series Star Trek: Enterprise. It was poorly received by some Star Trek fans – largely due to its departure from the character of previous Star Trek themes – who created petitions and protested the use of the song.

=== Development and release ===
It was the first time that an actual vocal theme was used in a Star Trek series. Watson had been approached by the producers of Enterprise and the song's writer, Diane Warren. As he was a fan of Star Trek and as Warren had already written a song for his second album, he agreed to the proposal. The song was featured on the soundtrack to Enterprise and Watson's 2002 album, Encore. The song was re-recorded for the third and fourth seasons of Enterprise. An instrumental version of the theme was played over the closing credits of the series' first episode, "Broken Bow", but was not used again in the series. One two-part episode from its fourth season, "In a Mirror, Darkly", replaced the theme with a different instrumental composition to reflect that storyline taking place in an alternate universe. As of 2024 it stands as the only Star Trek theme by a female composer.

The song has been used on four occasions as the music selected for wake-up calls on space missions. The first was on 16 June 2002 for the Space Shuttle Endeavour during mission STS-111 to the International Space Station. It was again used on 2 August 2005 for mission STS-114, the first mission of the Space Shuttle programme following the Space Shuttle Columbia disaster. It was broadcast to the seven crew of the Space Shuttle Discovery, and had been chosen as a surprise for the crew by Deputy Shuttle Programme Manager Wayne Hale. NASA astronaut Richard Mastracchio selected "Where My Heart Will Take Me" for broadcast on 9 August 2007 onboard Endeavour for STS-118. The final broadcast on board a Space Shuttle was on May 23, 2009 during STS-125, the final Space Shuttle servicing mission to the Hubble Space Telescope. On this occasion it was broadcast to the crew of the Space Shuttle Atlantis. It was the third science fiction themed wake-up call in a row, the previous day having been the Cantina Band composition by John Williams for Star Wars, and two days prior was Alexander Courage's Theme from Star Trek. Watson also recorded a special version of the song to be played for the final wake up of the New Horizons exploration spacecraft on December 6, 2014.

=== Reception ===
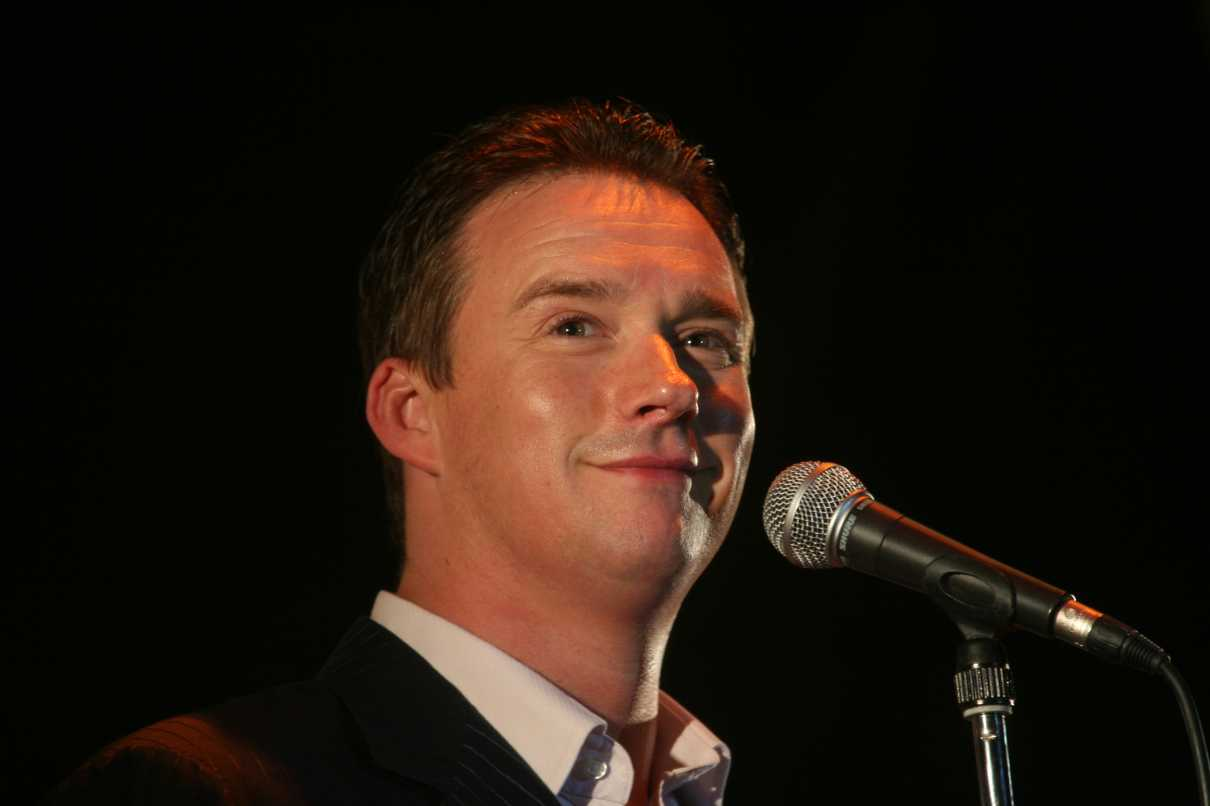
Singer Russell Watson said that Enterprise fans would get used to the song being used as a theme to the show.

Following the pilot episode of Star Trek: Enterprise, "Broken Bow", and the debut of the song as the series' theme tune, the reception among Star Trek fans was mostly negative. Such was the response, that online petitions were formed and a protest held outside Paramount Studios against the use of the song. One petition stated that "We wish to express our unmitigated disgust with the theme song that has been selected for the new 'Enterprise' series, it is not fit to be scraped off the bottom of a Klingon's boot." Actor Simon Pegg, who played engineer Montgomery Scott in Star Trek and Star Trek Beyond later said that he had never watched Enterprise due to the song, which he described as "dreadful soft-rock" and "probably the most hideous Star Trek moment in history". The song was mentioned in the review of the Enterprise first season DVD set by DVD Talk. It was called "sappy", and the reviewer said that it "never felt appropriate and serves only to undercut the emotional strength of the images on screen".

Executive producer of Enterprise, Rick Berman, praised the song, saying that it was a song "that's got a lot of hopefulness and uplifting qualities to it. And I like it. I've met a lot of other people who like it, but I've also heard a tremendous amount of banter about people who don't." Enterprise co-creator Brannon Braga also defended the song, saying of the protest, "There are some people who love the song and there are people who think it's cheesy. They came with a petition with 1,000 signatures. But plenty of people find the song very uplifting." Watson also said of the response to the song, "Something new happens, and people aren't quite sure of it. But they'll get used to it. By the time they've watched the 20th episode, they'll be thinking, 'Well, it's not that bad after all."

=== Live performances ===
Russell Watson performed "Where My Heart Will Take Me" as part of the opening ceremony of the 2002 Commonwealth Games, alongside a choir. The choir subsequently performed the song at a ceremony to mark the retirement of Bishop Christopher Mayfield from his post as Bishop of Manchester.

== Charts ==
=== Rod Stewart version ===
Chart (1999)	Peak position
Canada RPM Adult Contemporary	4
Canada RPM Top Singles	27
Netherlands (Single Top 100)	99
UK Singles (Official Charts)	60
US Bubbling Under Hot 100 (Billboard)	17
US Adult Contemporary (Billboard)	3

=== Year-end charts ===
Chart (1999)	Position
US Adult Contemporary (Billboard)	20

=== Susan Ashton version ===
Chart (1999)	Peak position
Canada Country Singles (RPM)	71
US Hot Country Songs (Billboard)	51
