= The Ultimate Collection (Russell Watson album) =

Greatest hits album by Russell Watson
- Released: 2006
- Recorded: 2001–2006
- Label: Decca

Russell Watson chronology
Amore Musica (2005)	The Ultimate Collection (2006)	That's Life (2007)

The Ultimate Collection is a compilation album by British tenor Russell Watson released in 2006. The album was produced by British record producer, Simon Franglen.

== Track listing ==
1. "Nella Fantasia"
2. "Caruso"
3. "Volare"
4. "The Prayer" (with Lulu)
5. "Il Gladiatore"
6. "You Raise Me Up"
7. "Miserere"
8. "Funiculi Funicula"
9. "O Sole Mio"
10. "Va Pensiero"
11. "You Are So Beautiful"
12. "Someone Like You" (with Faye Tozer)
13. "Is Nothing Sacred"
14. "Amore E Musica"
15. "Magia Sara"
16. "I Believe"
17. "Barcelona" (with Shaun Ryder)
18. "Nessun Dorma"
19. "I Have Nothing" (new track)
20. "Can't Help Falling in Love" (new track)

== Charts ==
Chart performance for The Ultimate Collection
Chart (2006–2007)	Peak position
Australian Albums (ARIA)	90
Irish Albums (IRMA)	70
New Zealand Albums (RMNZ)	9
UK Albums (OCC)	2
US Top Classical Albums (Billboard)	40
