= Closer (Susan Ashton album) =

Studio album by Susan Ashton
- Released: April 20, 1999
- Recorded: 1998–1999
- Studios: Emerald Sound Studios, Love Shack Studios and Woodland Sound Studios (Nashville, Tennessee)
- Genres: Country, country pop
- Length: 46:43
- Label: Capitol Nashville
- Producer: Emory Gordy Jr.

Susan Ashton chronology
A Distant Call (1996)	Closer (1999)	Lost in Wonder-Voices of Worship (2005)

Professional ratings
Review scores
Source	Rating
AllMusic	4/5 stars

Closer is the sixth studio album by American Christian and country music singer Susan Ashton. It was released in 1999 on Capitol Nashville. It was her only disc for the label. It was produced by Emory Gordy Jr. The album contains songs written by Diane Warren, Matraca Berg and Kim Richey. Ashton herself only co-wrote one song here, "Think of Me".

Three singles were released, with the Warren-penned "Faith of the Heart" being first. It peaked at No. 51 on the Hot Country Songs chart in the US, while peaking twenty spots lower in Canada. The second single, "You're Lucky I Love You", fared a bit better reaching No. 37 in the US and No. 52 in Canada. The title track didn't chart. The album itself reached No. 34 on the country charts, while failing to find a footing on the Christian music charts.

"Breathless" was later released as a single by River Road in 2001. Both The Jenkins and Hall & Oates released versions of "Getaway Car". "Supernatural" was later recorded by American country music singer Sara Evans on her 2005 album Real Fine Place.

== Reception ==
AllMusic's Heather Phares called Ashton "an emotive vocalist", and said that Closer "finds Ashton hitting her stride as a performer and singer", giving the album four stars out of five.

== Track listing ==
No.	Title	Writer(s)	Length
1.	"Come On in Out of the Rain"	Jamie O'Hara	2:53
2.	"Closer"	Neil Thrasher, Kim Williams, Kent Blazy	3:23
3.	"Our Little World"	Matraca Berg, Jeff Hanna	4:37
4.	"You're Lucky I Love You"	Thrasher, Maria Cannon-Goodman	3:31
5.	"I Ain't Gonna Fall for Love Again"	Kim Richey, Vince Melamed	3:21
6.	"Breathless"	Blazy, Thrasher, Kelly Shiver	3:25
7.	"Shot for the Moon"	Berg, Sharon Vaughn	3:56
8.	"Getaway Car"	Gary Haase, Billy Mann	4:59
9.	"Supernatural"	Marcus Hummon, Mark Prentice	3:55
10.	"Think of Me""	Ashton, Gayla Borders, Jeff Borders, J.D. Cunningham	4:06
11.	"Faith of the Heart"	Diane Warren	4:17
12.	"Can't Cry Hard Enough"	Marvin Etzioni, David Williams	4:20

== Personnel ==
- Susan Ashton – lead vocals, backing vocals (3, 5, 6, 8, 10), harmony vocals (12)
- John Barlow Jarvis – acoustic piano (1, 2, 5, 9, 10)
- Matt Rollings – acoustic piano (3, 4, 6, 7, 11, 12)
- Phil Madeira – Hammond B3 organ (8, 9)
- Steve Nathan – Hammond B3 organ (8)
- Mike Lawler – additional keyboards (11)
- Steve Gibson – electric guitars, mandolin (1), gut-string guitar (7), bouzouki (8)
- Steuart Smith – electric guitars (1–10, 12)
- Biff Watson – acoustic guitars
- Dann Huff – electric guitars (11)
- Paul Franklin – lap steel guitar, steel guitar (1–7, 9, 10, 12)
- Dan Dugmore – steel guitar (8)
- Sonny Garrish – steel guitar (11)
- Stuart Duncan – mandolin, fiddle, octave fiddle
- Emory Gordy Jr. – bass, string arrangements (5, 12)
- Lonnie Wilson – drums (1, 2, 4–7, 9–12)
- Steve Brewster – drums (3), percussion (8)
- Owen Hale – drums (8)
- Anthony LaMarchina – cello (5, 12)
- Bob Mason – cello (5, 12)
- Monisa Angell – viola (5, 12)
- Jim Grosjean – viola (5, 12)
- Gary Vanosdale – viola (5, 12)
- Kristin Wilkinson – viola (5, 12), concertmaster (5, 12)
- David Davidson – violin (5, 12)
- Connie Heard – violin (5, 12)
- Pamela Sixfin – violin (5, 12)
- Christopher Teal – violin (5, 12)
- J.D. Cunningham – backing vocals (1–6, 8–11)
- Neil Thrasher – backing vocals (1, 2, 4, 6)
- Harry Stinson – backing vocals (3, 9, 10)
- Vince Gill – harmony vocals (5), backing vocals (5)
- Billy Mann – backing vocals (8)
- Vicki Hampton – backing vocals (11)
- Chris Rodriguez – backing vocals (11)

Production

- Emory Gordy Jr. – producer
- Russ Martin – recording
- Rob MacMillan – recording assistant
- John Guess – mixing at The Work Station (Nashville, Tennessee)
- Patrick Murphy – mix assistant
- Glenn Meadows – mastering at Masterfonics (Nashville, Tennessee)
- Lauren Koch – production coordinator
- Virginia Team – art direction
- Chris Ferrara – design
- Mark Tucker – design, photography
- Maria Smoot – hair, make-up
- Susan Bessire – wardrobe stylist
- Carlton Davis – art production
- Denise Jarvis – production assistant
- Bob Doyle & Associates – management

== Chart performance ==
Chart (1999)	Peak position
U.S. Billboard Top Country Albums	34
