= Susan Ashton =

American singer (born 1967)

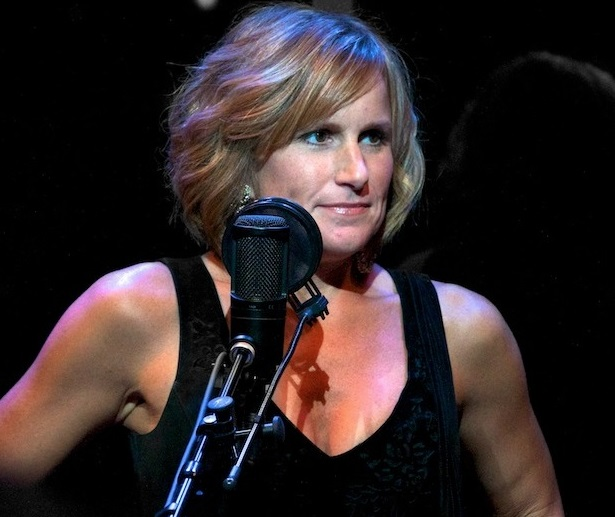
- Ashton in 2011

Background information
- Born: Susan Rae Hill; July 17, 1967 (age 59); Irving, Texas, U.S.
- Origin: Nashville, Tennessee, U.S.
- Genres: Contemporary Christian music, country, Christian country
- Instrument: Vocals
- Years active: 1991–present
- Labels: Sparrow, Capitol

Susan Ashton (born Susan Rae Hill; July 17, 1967) is an American contemporary Christian music and country music artist who topped the Christian charts throughout the 1990s. In 1991 she began using her mother's maiden name, Ashton, when she recorded her first single, in order to distinguish herself from fellow CCM singer Kim Hill.

Ashton has recorded eight studio albums to date, of which six were released on Sparrow Records. She has also charted fourteen number one hits on the Christian charts, and four singles on the Hot Country Songs charts; her highest-peaking song on the latter is 1999's "You're Lucky I Love You", which reached No. 37.

== Biography ==
=== 1991–1993 ===
In 1991, she released her debut album, Wakened by the Wind, which became the top-selling debut in the history of the Sparrow Records label, with Ashton repeatedly reaching number one in the Christian charts that year. She was nominated for a Dove award for New Artist of the Year and won a CCM readers and reporters poll for Best New Artist. Ashton claimed that her fondest memories with Sparrow Records were during the recording of her first album, "That was so special and since I was so young and green, there was a real innocence in that process that's still beautiful to me. I can listen to anything on that record, and it's all very clear with distinct emotions attached to making it. I love everything about the lyrics, musicianship and instrumentation. There's one song, "No One Knows My Heart," where the drummer played a shoebox. On "Suffer in Silence," one of the instruments credited was a "pencil guitar."

In 1992, her second album, Angels of Mercy, produced four CCM number one singles and was nominated for a Grammy in the Best Pop Gospel Album category. Also in 1992 Susan appeared on Paul Overstreet's album "Love Is Strong", singing a duet on Paul's song "What's Going Without Saying".

On her eponymous 1993 release, Ashton was quoted during the recording of the album track "Heart Like a Rock, "I was messing around doing vocals and singing along trying to sound like an electric guitar. We actually recorded it and that sound of me imitating the guitar is still kept in the final record. There was so much fun stuff on all those records and they were all a reflection of growth and maturity and life experience through those years."

Ashton won the 1993 CCM Readers Award for Favorite Inspirational Album and a reporters poll for Best Female Artist. Later that year, she married John David Cunningham.

=== 1994–1997 ===
In 1994, Ashton, in collaboration with CCM artists Margaret Becker and Out of the Grey's Christine Denté, released a trio album Along the Road. The title track is a remake of the composition by Dan Fogelberg, while the remaining songs are original to this album. Lead vocals are split evenly among the three singers.

Also in 1994, Garth Brooks approached Ashton to open for him on his European Tour. She stated in 2005,"I did a leg of his '94 European tour, but we weren't playing to his largest crowds. But there was still something very special about his audience. Initially I was a little nerve-wracked, worrying they'd boo me off the stage, but I got a wonderful response. I was also really nervous about meeting him, but he was so nice and supportive. He told me if there was anything I ever needed, just to let him know."

So Far... The Best of Susan Ashton Volume 1, an album of mostly previously released singles, was released in 1995, and featured a newly recorded track entitled "Stand."

A Distant Call was released in 1996. This album included two songs co-written by Sheryl Crow, and one with the late Kevin Gilbert who wrote many hit songs for Crow. Wayne Kirkpatrick once again provided significant songwriting for the album, co-writing several songs with Ashton. Amy Grant and Michael W. Smith also provided co-writing credits on one song each. Alison Krauss provided background vocals for "Love Profound." Garth Brooks would release his own version of Ashton's single "You Move Me" on his own album "Sevens" the following year, which became an international hit.

Ashton provided vocals along with Collin Raye for the 1997 Jim Brickman single "The Gift", from Brickman's Christmas album of the same name. That single was number one on the pop charts for three consecutive weeks.

=== 1997–2003 ===
In 1999, Capital released her first non-CCM album Closer. She reached the country music charts with "You're Lucky I Love You", which peaked at No. 38. Included on this album is Ashton's cover of "Can't Cry Hard Enough", a song originally recorded by The Williams Brothers. This album was not a commercial success. When asked about this, Ashton responded in 2005, "My perspective is that it did not turn out what I wanted it to be. I wanted it to be a great country record because I'm from Texas and I love that music. But the producers I was working with—who I wholeheartedly believed wanted the best for me—loved my Christian records [with Sparrow], and they were trying to emulate those a little bit. I'm proud of those records, but they aren't country records." Song writing for this album includes Kim Richey, Matraca Berg, Bill Mann and Diane Warren. Ashton only co-wrote one song. Closer was produced by Emory Gordy, Jr., husband and producer to Patty Loveless.

Around this time, Ashton and Cunningham divorced.

Ashton widened her audience even further when, in 2000, she debuted on the PBS music television program Austin City Limits for their 25th Anniversary.

A second album for Capital was recorded, but the album was shelved and has never been released (although the first single "She Is", was released). Ashton has stated, "I spent three years making a follow-up record for Capitol and then early last year they dropped me from the label. So I've spent the last year being a nanny, sitting, waiting and hearing what God wants me to do with my life. It was really difficult, but at the same time I've I needed some healing and clarity. This past year has been really emotional and ultimately turned out really good. I think I was probably aware that I was going to lose my deal, but it's a whole different story knowing you're going to lose it and then actually having it be gone." This interview came after years of silence from Ashton.

=== 2005–present ===
In 2005 Ashton released a second trio album. Originally released only in Australia and Europe as Kisses from Heaven, the album was eventually released in the United States as Lost in Wonder: Voices of Worship. This album was recorded with Michelle Tumes and Christine Denté. The album was conceived in 2003. When asked how the project came about, Ashton replied, "About two years ago I became friends with [the project's producer] John Hartley. Before I lost my record deal, I was asked to sing some demos for what would become a worship project releasing in England. When I lost my deal, John asked if I would still be interested in continuing with the project. God had been healing me, growing me and helping me find my center again, and this seemed to fit as part of his plan." Ashton did not record the vocals in person with Denté and Tumes. The three were only together for the cover's photo shoot.

In 2006 Sparrow Records released Susan Ashton: The Ultimate Collection, a two-CD set of previously released material.

Ashton started a MySpace page in 2006, on which she posted two demo versions of new songs.

In 2009, she appeared on Collin Raye's album Never Going Back, singing a duet with Raye on a cover of "Without You".

On March 5, 2013, Ashton released Thief, a self-distributed six-song EP.

== Discography ==
=== Albums ===
Title	Album details	Peak chart positions		
Title	Album details	US Christian	US Country	US
Wakened by the Wind	Release date: February 25, 1991; Label: Sparrow Records	8	—	—
Angels of Mercy	Release date: July 3, 1992; Label: Sparrow Records	2	—	—
Susan Ashton	Release date: November 2, 1993; Label: Sparrow Records	—	—	—
Walk On	Release date: 1994; Label: Sparrow Records	3	—	—
So Far... The Best of Susan Ashton Volume 1	Release date: August 29, 1995; Label: Sparrow Records	11	—	—
A Distant Call	Release date: October 1, 1996; Label: Chordant Records	6	—	163
Closer	Release date: July 27, 1999; Label: Capitol Nashville	—	34	—
Thief (EP)	Release date: March 5, 2013; Label: Be Music & Entertainment	–	—	—
"—" denotes releases that did not chart

=== Collaborations ===
Title	Album details
Along the Road (with Margaret Becker and Christine Denté)	Release date: September 20, 1994; Label: Sparrow Records
Lost in Wonder: Voices of Worship (with Michelle Tumes and Christine Denté)	Release date: March 1, 2005; Label: Kingsway Records

=== Singles ===
Year	Single	Peak chart positions		Album
Year	Single	US Country	CAN Country	Album
1991	"Down on My Knees"	—	—	Wakened by the Wind
1991	"In Amazing Grace Land"	—	—	Wakened by the Wind
1992	"Ball and Chain"	—	—	Wakened by the Wind
1992	"Here in My Heart"	—	—	Angels of Mercy
1992	"Grand Canyon"	—	—	Angels of Mercy
1993	"Hunger and Thirst"	—	—	Angels of Mercy
1993	"Walk on By"	—	—	Angels of Mercy
1993	"Waiting for Your Love to Come Down"	—	—	Susan Ashton
1994	"Remember Not"	—	—	Susan Ashton
1995	"Stand"	—	87	So Far... The Best of Susan Ashton
1996	"You Move Me"	—	—	A Distant Call
1999	"Faith of the Heart"	51	71	Closer
1999	"You're Lucky I Love You"	37	52	Closer
1999	"Closer"	—	—	Closer
2003	"She Is"	56	—	single only
2005	"I Will Never Be the Same" (w/ Michelle Tumes and Christine Dente)^{A}	—	—	Lost in Wonder: Voices of Worship
2013	"Love Is Alive"	—	—	Thief
2013	"Moonshine"	—	—	Thief
"—" denotes releases that did not chart

- ^{A}"I Will Never Be the Same" peaked at No. 34 on Hot Christian Songs.

=== Guest singles ===
Year	Single	Artist	Peak chart positions			Album
Year	Single	Artist	US Country	US AC	CAN Country	Album
1997	"The Gift"	Jim Brickman (with Collin Raye)	51	3	52	The Gift

=== Music videos ===
Year	Video	Director
1992	"Here in My Heart"	
1996	"You Move Me"	
1997	"The Gift" (with Jim Brickman and Collin Raye)	Norry Niven
1999	"You're Lucky I Love You"	Picture Vision
