= Helen Jane Long =

British composer, musician and pianist (born 1974)

- Born: 10 April 1974 (age 52)
- Origin: Hampshire, England
- Genre: classical music
- Occupations: composer, film composer
- Instruments: piano, clarinet, guitar, cello, organ, violin
- Years active: 1994–present
- Label: BLE Music Group
- Website: helenjanelong.com

Helen Jane Long (born 10 April 1974) is a British composer, musician and pianist, best known for advertising music, film scores, and contemporary-classical piano albums, Embers (2010) (BLE) and Porcelain (Warner Music Group). In 2003, Long worked as music assistant to Howard Shore on the film score for The Lord of the Rings trilogy. Long composed the original music for the movie thrillers The Only Hotel and Surveillance 24/7. As the world's highest streaming female pianist, Long's songs have been streamed more than one billion times.

== Early life, education ==
Long was born on 10 April 1974 in Hampshire, England. She began training as a classical pianist at age 4, also learning clarinet, guitar, cello, vocals, organ, and violin later on.

Long began composing when she entered college. However, frustrated with the progression of her music degree, she claims she spent her entire student loan on a huge sequencer keyboard. She then slowly continued to amass the equipment needed for a fully operational home recording studio where she independently practised recording, producing, scoring, arranging, and mixing.

== Career ==
After college Long began working for the BBC on the children's shows Blue Peter and Live & Kicking, where she periodically worked with Ronnie Hazlehurst (composer for Only Fools and Horses), Dennis King of Black Beauty, and Nigel Hess (composer of the film Ladies in Lavender). She has also worked with composers Jerry Goldsmith and Ron Goodwin. She was signed to a major label soon after sending out demos of her material. Long has since written scores, piano pieces, and full orchestrations for many films and television spots.

In 2003 Long served as a music score assistant for composer Howard Shore on the film trilogy The Lord of the Rings, as well as the extended DVDs. Long, who had met Shore before the films, served as his personal copy editor for the sheet music he wrote daily for new scenes. She was also known on set for reliably supplying brownies and pancakes.

She is well known for scoring the often played Volkswagen Passat commercials in 2005. Since 2005 she has scored a large amount of for-television documentaries on Channel 4, Channel 5, the Discovery Channel, and the BBC, including Behind the Da Vinci Code and Open Gardens in 2008. She has also scored several short films and the feature films The Only Hotel and Surveillance (2007). She has done several recordings with the Royal Philharmonic Orchestra, notably in 2007 when she worked with them to compose and record an album of orchestral music.

=== Solo Releases ===
Porcelain (2007)

Long released her debut album Porcelain on 24 July 2007 on Warner Classics. The album is a collection of original piano compositions, many in a classically expressive and filmic style. Besides Long on piano, the recording sessions also included musicians Jonathan Hill and Nick Holland. The cello used in the recordings was handmade by Long's father. As of 1 February 2010, Porcelain was the top selling album on America's largest classical radio station, and she secured a sell-out tour of the United States.

On 3 May 2010 Long released her second piano album Embers with BLE Music Group. The album quickly became widely requested on worldwide classical radio stations, and was "most requested" on Classic FM radio.

Intervention (2012)

Identity (2016)
Perspective (2018)

On 13 September 2024, Long released the single "Shine", in collaboration with Russell Watson; the single came from the duet album of the same name. On 25 November 2024, the pair released the single "You (A Christmas Wish)". On 22 August 2025, they released a radio mix of "Unremember" as a single.

== Awards ==
Long was Radio Classic FM's Guest List Composer in 2007. She was also selected as Audio Network's Composer of the Month for February 2010.

== Personal life ==
Helen Long lives in the south east of the United Kingdom, where she is an avid water-skier and triathlete.

== Discography ==
=== Scoring history ===
Feature Films

- The Only Hotel – (Globocine, 2003)
- Surveillance 24/7 – (2007)
- Tout Le Mond En Parfait – (Canadian Films, 2007)
- Los Testigos De La Guerra – (2007)
- Finding Fatima (2010) – stock music

Adverts, Commercials

- NSPCC – (2000)
- Mercedes – 2004
- Galaxy Chocolate – 2005
- Volkswagen Passat – 2005
- Disney Princess – (2006)
- National Express – (2006)
- Bosch – (2007)
- Aviator - (2011) British Airways: To Fly, To Serve

Documentaries

- Road to Berlin – (Discovery, 2005)
- The F Word – (Channel 4, 2006)
- Fifth Gear – (Channel 5, 2006)
- The Hotel Inspector – (Channel 5, 2006)
- Face of Britain – (Channel 4, 2007)
- The Insider – (Channel 4, 2007)
- Behind The Da Vinci Code – (USA TV, 2008)
- Dispatches – (Channel 4, 2008)
- Open Gardens – (BBC, 2008)
- Sport Relief – (BBC, 2008)
- Storms of War – (Discovery, 2008)

Short Films

- Out in the Cold – (Marchmont, 2005)
- Save the World – (David Casals, 2007)
- Asphyxia – (2008)
- Unlikely Maestro – (2012)
- Weekend Dad

Television

- BAFTA Awards
- The F Word – (Channel 4, 2006)

Miscellanies

- Frog from the Website Pottermore

=== Albums ===
- Porcelain (2007)
- Embers (2010)
- Intervention (2012)
- Identity (2016)
- Live at St. James's, London (2016)
- Perspective (2018)
- Vessel of Light (2020)
- Disconnect (2022)
