= The Voice (Russell Watson album) =

Studio album by Russell Watson
- Released: 25 September 2000; 17 April 2001 (USA)
- Recorded: 2000
- Genre: Crossover
- Length: 61:59
- Label: Decca
- Producer: Nick Patrick

Russell Watson chronology
The Voice (2000)	Encore (2001)

The Voice is the 2000 debut album by British tenor Russell Watson.

== Track listing ==
1. "Nella Fantasia" - Metro Voices, Royal Philharmonic Orchestra, Russell Watson
2. "Amor Ti Vieta" (from Fedora) - The London Session Orchestra, Russell Watson
3. "Pelagia's Song" (from Captain Corelli's Mandolin) - Russell Watson
4. "Caruso" - The London Session Orchestra, Russell Watson
5. "Miserere" - Royal Philharmonic Orchestra, Russell Watson
6. "Panis angelicus" - Royal Philharmonic Orchestra, Russell Watson
7. "Non ti scordar di me" - Royal Philharmonic Orchestra, Russell Watson
8. "La donna è mobile" (from "Rigoletto") - Royal Philharmonic Orchestra, Russell Watson
9. "Saylon Dola" - Máire Brennan, Royal Philharmonic Orchestra, Russell Watson
10. "Someone Like You" - Cleopatra Higgins, Royal Philharmonic Orchestra, Russell Watson
11. "Bridge over Troubled Water" - Royal Philharmonic Orchestra, Russell Watson
12. "Vienna" - Royal Philharmonic Orchestra, Russell Watson
13. "Funiculì, Funiculà" - Metro Voices, Royal Philharmonic Orchestra, Russell Watson
14. "Barcelona" - Metro Voices, Royal Philharmonic Orchestra, Shaun Ryder, Russell Watson
15. "Nessun Dorma!" (from Turandot) - Metro Voices, Royal Philharmonic Orchestra, Russell Watson

== Charts ==
=== Weekly charts ===
Chart (2000–2002)	Peak position
Australian Albums (ARIA)	10
Irish Albums (IRMA)	23
New Zealand Albums (RMNZ)	23
Portuguese Albums (AFP)	1
Scottish Albums (OCC)	10
Swedish Albums (Sverigetopplistan)	17
UK Albums (OCC)	5
US Billboard 200	90
US Top Classical Albums (Billboard)	1
US Heatseekers Albums (Billboard)	2

=== Year-end charts ===
Year-end chart performance for The Voice by Russell Watson
Chart (2000)	Position
UK Albums (OCC)	33
Chart (2001)	Position
Canadian Albums (Nielsen SoundScan)	181
UK Albums (OCC)	79
Chart (2002)	Position
Australian Albums (ARIA)	67

== Certifications ==
Region	Certification	Certified units/sales
Portugal (AFP)	Gold	20,000^{^}
^{^} Shipments figures based on certification alone.
