= La Voce (album) =

Studio album by Russell Watson
- Released: 22 November 2010 (UK)
- Recorded: June 2010
- Label: Epic
- Producer: Mike Hedges

Russell Watson chronology
People Get Ready (2008)	La Voce (2010)	Anthems – Music To Inspire A Nation (2012)

La Voce is the ninth album by British tenor Russell Watson and his first resumption of a largely classical repertoire since overcoming brain cancer.

On 29 October 2010 Russell announced the release of his ninth album La Voce. The album was recorded in June 2010 with the Roma Sinfonietta in the historic studio Forum Music Village, produced by Mike Hedges and was released on 22 November 2010 on Epic Records, his first release on this label.

== Track listing ==
No.	Title	Writer(s)	Arranger(s)	Length
1.	"Parla Piu Piano"	Nino Rota, Gianni Boncompagni	Maestro Peppe Vessicchio	4:07
2.	"E Sara Cosi"	Sergei Rachmaninov, Giuseppi Marcucci, Massimo Bizzarri	Sally Herbert	3:39
3.	"Be My Love"	Nickolaus Brodsky, Sammy Cahn	Sally Herbert	3:14
4.	"Arrivederci Roma"	Pietro Garinei, Renato Ranucci, Alessandro Giovanni	Maestro Peppe Vessicchio	3:26
5.	"Io Che Non Vivo (Senza Te)"	Pino Donaggio, Vito Pallavicini	Maestro Peppe Vessicchio	3:53
6.	"La Vita Senza Te"	Andy Hill, Antonio Galbiata	Steven Baker	4:14
7.	"Concerto D’Autunno"	Camillo Bargoni, Danpa	Sally Herbert	3:45
8.	"Intermezzo"	Pietro Mascagni, Piero Mazzoni	Steven Baker	4:55
9.	"Love Story"	Francis Lai, Carl Sigman	Maestro Peppe Vessicchio	4:06
10.	"Solo Con Te"	Andy Hill, Jim Cregan, Valerio Calisse	Maestro Renato Serio	4:25
11.	"Adagio"	Remo Giazotto, Lara Fabian	Sally Herbert	3:51
12.	"Parlami D'Amore Mariù"	Cesare Bixio, Ennio Neri	Maestro Peppe Vessicchio	4:10
13.	"Someone to Remember Me"	Wayne Hector, Steve Robson	Maestro Renato Serio	4:32

== Critical reception ==
Professional ratings
Review scores
Source	Rating
Daily Express	4/5 stars
Female First	5/5 stars
Indie London	5/5 stars

La Voce was received extremely well by the Daily Express; garnering four stars.

== Chart performance ==
=== Weekly charts ===
Chart (2010–11)	Peak position
Australian Albums (ARIA)	31
European Top 100 Albums	43
Irish Albums (IRMA)	56
New Zealand Albums (RMNZ)	5
Scottish Albums (OCC)	12
UK Albums (OCC)	13
UK Classical (OCC)	1

=== Year-end charts ===
Chart (2010)	Position
UK Albums (OCC)	89

== Release history ==
Region	Date	Format	Label	Catalogue	Barcode
United Kingdom	29 November 2010	CD, digital download	Epic Records	88697773392	886977733925
