= Cleopatra (group) =

British girl group

- Cleopatra in 2008 (L–R): Yonah, Zainam and Cleo Higgins

Background information
- Also known as: Cleopatra ZYC
- Origin: Moss Side, Manchester, England
- Genres: R&B; pop
- Years active: 1997–2001; 2005; 2008–2009; 2013; 2017–2023
- Labels: WEA; Maverick
- Members: Cleo Higgins; Yonah Higgins; Zainam Higgins

Cleopatra were a British girl group, consisting of sisters Cleo, Zainam and Yonah Higgins. Their debut single, "Cleopatra's Theme", entered the UK Singles Chart at number 3, and the Billboard Hot 100 at number 26.

== Biography ==
=== Comin' Atcha! ===
The girl group were originally based in Manchester, England with sisters Cleo, Yonah, and Zainam Higgins. At first they were known as Cleopatra and the Attractions. At that point Cleo was the lead singer with Yonah and Zainam serving as backup singers and dancers. They later dropped that name and became known as the band Cleopatra. Their debut single was "Cleopatra's Theme", which was taken from their debut album Comin' Atcha!, and it entered the UK Singles Chart at number 3 giving them their first Top 5 hit single.

The next three singles—"Life Ain't Easy", a cover of The Jackson 5's "I Want You Back" and "Thank ABBA for the Music"—all followed the same success by reaching the top 5, gaining the girls BRIT Awards and MOBO Awards nominations. They performed at the 1999 BRIT Awards and were nominated for Best British Newcomer. Madonna signed Cleopatra to her Maverick label and introduced them to the United States at Nickelodeon's 11th Annual Kids' Choice Awards, where they performed their debut single, "Cleopatra's Theme". It was released shortly afterwards, reaching number 26 on the Billboard Hot 100, and number 16 on the US Hot R&B/Hip-Hop Songs chart. The video was also popular, peaking at number 4 on the TRL Top 10 countdown. Their debut album Comin' Atcha entered the US top 30 in July 1998 and sold over 300,000 copies. The group filmed a live show for a 60-minute Disney Channel special, "Cleopatra in Concert", where they performed their biggest hits aboard the Disney cruise ship, Disney Magic. The show also contained a behind-the-scenes look into the lives of the three sisters over a four-day Bahamas cruise.

Cleopatra were invited to support the Spice Girls on the UK leg of their sell out Spiceworld Tour playing to 150,000 fans at Wembley Stadium. They were also invited to perform at the Vatican Christmas Carol Concert, by request of Pope John Paul II, an event which is broadcast around the world. Backed by a 100-piece orchestra, they sang "O Come All Ye Faithful" and "Silent Night". The performance was later released on DVD in 2004 as All-Star Christmas - From the Vatican. They covered the Bee Gees song "I've Gotta Get a Message to You", renaming it "Gotta Get a Message to You", for the tribute album of the same name. They were also asked to record a cover of the disco song "Right Back Where We Started From" for An Extremely Goofy Movie by Disney.

=== Steppin' Out ===
Cleopatra moved onto their second album Steppin' Out, working with top record producers, including Jimmy Jam and Terry Lewis, Dallas Austin, Daryl Simmons, Cutfather & Joe, and Stargate. They shot their album cover with photographer Markus Klinko. They toured the US in 2000 promoting the lead single from Steppin Out, "U Got It". They promoted the single on various television programs including The Tonight Show with Jay Leno and The Queen Latifah Show.

Also as the new spokeswomen for cosmetics firm CoverGirl, they sang the theme tune for their new make-up line 'Triple Lipstick' television advertisement. The advert, narrated by Cleo, was filmed on Miami's South Beach in 2000 and saw the girls on stage performing the theme song. They then moved on to tour Japan and promoted their Jimmy Jam and Terry Lewis produced Japanese single "Yes, The Party's Going Right". They were invited to perform a mini-concert for the Sultan of Brunei and his royal family.

However, changes within Warner and everyone who was working on the Cleopatra project led to lack of promotion of their UK single, "Come and Get Me" which entered the UK Singles Chart at number 29; the Steppin' Out release date for the UK was pushed back, and the album was eventually never released in the UK. The label wanted Cleo as a solo artist, and this led to the group's parting ways with Warner.

=== Television sitcom ===
On Christmas Eve 1998, CITV premiered Cleopatra's one-hour Christmas Special for their new sitcom, with a host of stars to help launch the show. The series had two seasons: Season 1 Comin' Atcha! and Season 2, In the House. The show was twenty minutes per episode and a mix of music and comedy. The plot followed the girls' lives on tour and at home with their family. Their mother and younger sister were featured in both seasons as themselves.

=== Later works ===
In 2005, the group came together for a one-off performance on ITV1's Hit Me, Baby, One More Time. They later appeared on Living TV's Pop Goes the Band in 2009. On 17 November 2009, Cleopatra performed a comeback show live at Embassy in London. As of 2026, the band have yet to release any new music.

Cleo appeared as a contestant on series 2 of The Voice UK, making the semi-finals.

== Members ==
- Cleo Higgins – lead vocals
- Zainam Higgins – backing vocals
- Yonah Higgins – backing vocals

== Discography ==
Cleopatra discography
- Studio albums: 2
- Singles: 8

=== Studio albums ===
Title	Album details	Peak chart positions					Certifications
Title	Album details	UK	AUS	NZ	SCO	US	Certifications
Comin' Atcha!	Released: June 1998; Label: WEA, Maverick Records	20	78	34	42	109	BPI: Silver
Steppin' Out	Released: August 2000; Label: WEA, Maverick	—	—	—	—	—	
"—" denotes items that did not chart or were not released in that territory.

=== Singles ===
Year	Title	Peak chart positions										Certifications	Album
Year	Title	UK	AUS	BEL	FRA	GER	IRE	NED	NZ	SWE	US	Certifications	Album
1998	"Cleopatra's Theme"	3	25	14	47	46	11	10	6	21	26		Comin' Atcha!
1998	"Life Ain't Easy"	4	37	—	—	72	20	52	7	—	81		Comin' Atcha!
1998	"I Want You Back"	4	—	—	19	98	26	67	13	49	—		Comin' Atcha!
1999	"A Touch of Love"	24	—	—	—	—	—	—	40	—	—		Comin' Atcha!
1999	"Thank ABBA for the Music" (with Steps, Tina Cousins, B*Witched and Billie)	4	9	23	—	97	5	14	6	8	—	BPI: Silver; ARIA: Platinum; RMNZ: Gold	ABBAmania (ABBA tribute album)
2000	"Come and Get Me"	29	—	—	—	77	—	—	—	—	—		Steppin' Out
2000	"U Got It"	—	—	—	—	—	—	—	—	—	—		Steppin' Out
2001	"Yes This Party's Going Right"	—	—	—	—	—	—	—	—	—	—		Steppin' Out
"—" denotes items that did not chart or were not released in that territory.
