= Celeste Aida =

Aria from the opera "Aida" by Giuseppe Verdi

Sung by Enrico Caruso
Recitative and aria
With orchestra

Aria
With piano accompaniment

"Celeste Aida" ("Heavenly Aida") is a romanza from the first act of the opera Aida by Giuseppe Verdi, with a text by Antonio Ghislanzoni. It is preceded by the recitative "Se quel guerrier io fossi!". The aria is sung by Radamès, a young Egyptian warrior who wishes to be chosen as a commander of the Egyptian army. He dreams of gaining victory on the battlefield and also of the Ethiopian slave girl, Aida, with whom he is secretly in love.

This scene takes place in the hall of the king's palace.

== Libretto ==
Se quel guerrier io fossi!
Se il mio sogno si avverasse!
Un esercito di prodi da me guidato
E la vittoria e il plauso di Menfi tutta!
E a te, mia dolce Aida,
Tornar di lauri cinto
Dirti: per te ho pugnato,
Per te ho vinto!

Celeste Aida, forma divina,
Mistico serto di luce e fior,
Del mio pensiero tu sei regina,
Tu di mia vita sei lo splendor.
Il tuo bel cielo vorrei ridarti,
Le dolci brezze del patrio suol
Un regal serto sul crin posarti,
Ergerti un trono vicino al sol.

If only I were that warrior!
If only my dream might come true!
An army of brave men with me as their leader
And victory and the applause of all Memphis!
And to you, my sweet Aida,
To return crowned with laurels,
To tell you: for you I have fought,
For you I have won!

Heavenly Aida, divine form,
Mystical garland of light and flowers,
You are queen of my thoughts,
You are the splendour of my life.
I want to give you back your beautiful sky,
The sweet breezes of your native land,
To place a royal garland on your hair,
To raise you a throne next to the sun.
