= Amore Musica =

Studio album by Russell Watson
- Released: 2 November 2004
- Recorded: 2004
- Label: Decca
- Producer: Simon Frangien

Russell Watson chronology
Reprise (2002)	Amore Musica (2004)	The Ultimate Collection (2006)

Professional ratings
Review scores
Source	Rating
AllMusic	3.5/5 stars

Amore Musica is the fourth album by British tenor Russell Watson released in 2004. The album was produced by British record producer Simon Franglen.

== Track listing ==
1. "Amore E Musica"
2. "Magia Sarà"
3. "You Raise Me Up" - Secret Garden cover
4. "Gladiatore" - based on the film Gladiator
5. "I Te Vurria Vasa"
6. "I Believe"
7. "La Flamma Sacra"
8. "You'll Still Be There for Me" - based on the film Rob Roy
9. "Alchemist" featuring Lara Fabian
10. "Pray For The Love"
11. "C'è Sempre Musica"
12. "I'll Walk with God" - from The Student Prince
13. "We Will Stand Together" - based on Elgar's Nimrod

== Charts ==
Chart performance for Amore Musica
Chart (2004)	Peak position
Australian Albums (ARIA)	10
New Zealand Albums (RMNZ)	2
Portuguese Albums (AFP)	5
UK Albums (Official Charts)	10
US Top Classical Albums (Billboard)	6
