= Russell Watson =

English tenor

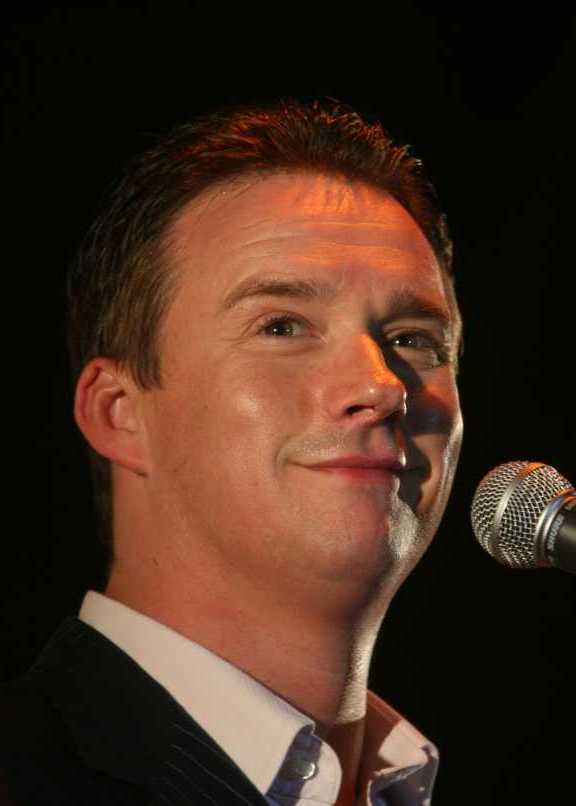
- Watson performing in 2007

Background information
- Born: 24 November 1966 (age 59); Irlam, Lancashire, England
- Genres: Classical crossover; operatic pop
- Occupation: Tenor
- Years active: 1998–present
- Labels: Decca (2000–2009); Sony (2009–2017); BMG (2018–present)
- Spouses: Helen Watson (div. 2002); Louise Harris (m. 2015)

Russell Watson (born 24 November 1966) is an English crossover and popular singer, almost in the tenor range, who has released singles and albums of both quasi-operatic-style and pop songs.

He began singing as a child and became known after performing at a working men's club. He came to attention in 1999 when he sang "God Save the Queen" at the Rugby League Challenge Cup Final at Wembley Stadium, "Barcelona" at the last match of the Premiership season between Manchester United and Tottenham Hotspur at Old Trafford, and a full set of songs at the 1999 UEFA Champions League Final in Barcelona between Manchester United and Bayern Munich.

Watson's debut album The Voice was released in May 2001; four others followed. An album planned for November 2006 was delayed due to the removal of a benign pituitary tumour. This album, titled That's Life, was eventually released in March 2007. Later that year, it was discovered that there had been a regrowth of the pituitary tumour and bleeding into Watson's brain. He underwent emergency surgery and was discharged from hospital on 31 October. He underwent an extensive rehabilitation programme, including radiotherapy. His sixth studio album, Outside In, was released on 26 November 2007. Watson released La Voce, his first album since overcoming the brain tumour, in 2010.

Watson has released thirteen studio albums. His latest is a collaborative album with singer Aled Jones, Christmas with Aled and Russell, which was released in November 2022.

== Early life ==
Russell Watson was born on 24 November 1966. He attended Irlam Endowed Primary School. He then began work on a Youth Opportunities Programme as a bolt-cutter.

Although Watson had been singing since he was a child, he never sought a career as a professional singer. Then married and with a baby, he began to earn extra money singing cover versions of Elvis Presley and other artists in North West clubs to help support his young family.

== Career ==
=== 1990-1999: Early career and discovery ===
In 1990 he won a Search for a Star contest organised by Manchester's Piccadilly Radio.

In 1998 Ian Boasman, manager of the Bistro French restaurant in Preston, arranged for him to sing at Old Trafford during the interval at a memorial football match for the Munich air disaster, a huge privilege for a lifelong Manchester United fan. However, his appearance was cancelled at the last minute when player Eric Cantona requested that Mick Hucknall sing instead. Russell signed a management deal with Boasman; this also involved comic Bobby Ball and businessman Keith Chadwick.

In 1999 he sang "God Save the Queen" at the Rugby League Challenge Cup Final at Wembley Stadium, then finally sang at Old Trafford before the last match of the Premiership season between Manchester United and Tottenham Hotspur. After the game, when his team had won the league championship, he returned to the pitch to sing the Freddie Mercury and Montserrat Caballé song "Barcelona", during which he tore off his dinner jacket to reveal a Manchester United shirt; a week later he was invited to sing a full set at the final of the UEFA Champions League in Barcelona between United and Bayern Munich, duetting with Montserrat Caballé.

=== 2000-2007: The Voice, War of the Worlds and That's Life ===
Watson was now managed by Perry Hughes, who was pivotal in the success of Watson's career during these years. Watson's début album, The Voice, followed in May 2001. A mixture of operatic arias and covers of pop songs, it topped the UK classical chart and eventually reached number five in the UK Albums Chart. When it was released in the United States, it took the number one spot, the first time a British artist had held both the US and UK classical number one. The album contained perhaps Watson's most unusual collaboration to date, with former Happy Mondays singer Shaun Ryder who lent his vocals to the Freddie Mercury and Montserrat Caballé song "Barcelona". It also featured a duet with Faye Tozer of pop group Steps, "Someone Like You", which when released as a single, charted at number 10 on the UK Singles chart.

Prior to the formation of Velvet Revolver, Watson was asked by Slash (guitarist of Guns N' Roses) whether he would be their singer. Watson turned down this opportunity to focus on his solo career.

In 2001, Watson sang the opening theme of the television series Star Trek: Enterprise, "Where My Heart Will Take Me", written by Diane Warren. He also sang it live at the opening ceremony of the Commonwealth Games in Manchester in 2002. In 2003, the song was remixed to a more upbeat version. In August 2007, it was played as a wake-up call for American Mission Specialist Richard Mastracchio on Space Shuttle Endeavour mission STS-118.

In late 2004, Watson released the single "Nothing Sacred – A Song for Kirsty" to raise £5 million for the Francis House children's hospice in Didsbury, Manchester. The campaign was fronted by Kirsty Howard, a seven-year-old girl with a serious heart defect. The song reached number 17 on the UK Singles Chart.

The self-styled "People's Tenor", who is also known as "The Voice" after his first album, won the Album of the Year at the Classical BRIT Awards in both 2001 and 2002, also collecting awards for Best-Selling Debut Album (2001) and Best-Selling Album (2002).

In 2005, he collaborated with Secret Garden for his song "Always There" from the album Earthsongs. In November 2005, Watson recorded "True To Your Dreams", his ending theme for the video game Castlevania: Curse of Darkness.

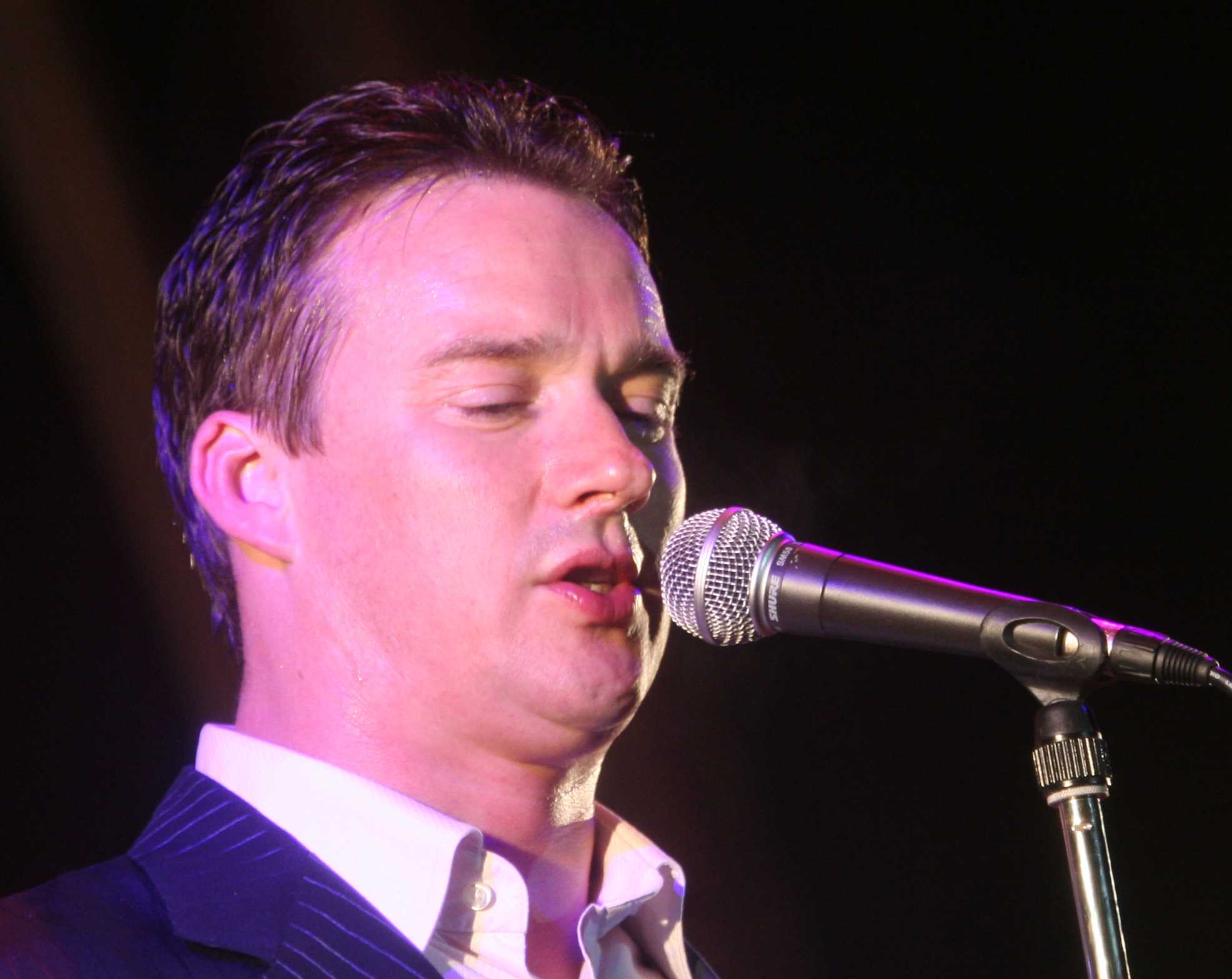

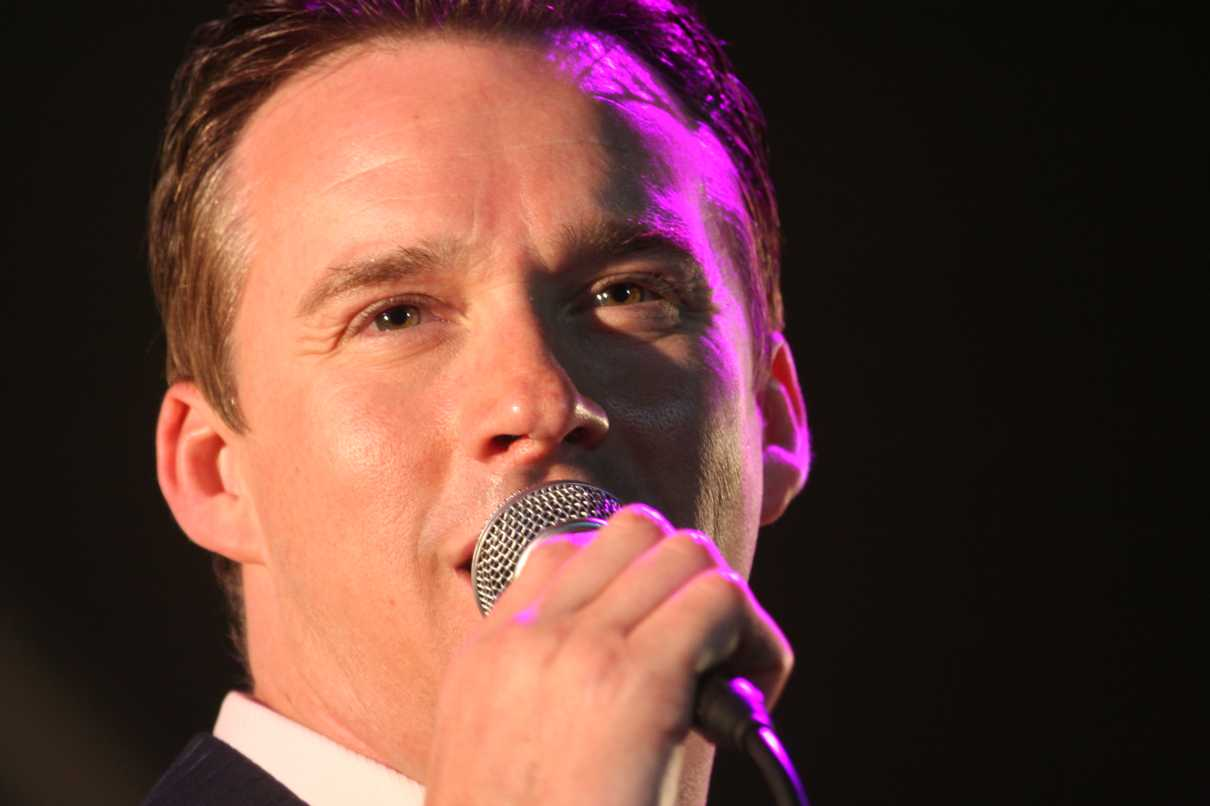
Watson performing at Broadlands, in Hampshire, England, in 2007.

In addition to his recording work, Watson played Parson Nathaniel in the stage adaptation of Jeff Wayne's Musical Version of The War of the Worlds which toured the UK in early 2006. In the same year, he also took part in the BBC reality TV show Just the Two of Us. The programme involved eight couples, including Siân Reeves and Watson, competing in a duet-singing showdown, complete with a live band, a panel of judges and viewer voting, to see who would be crowned champions. A wide array of music was performed, from country and western to rock. The scores each week were tallied from both a judging vote (the judges were Lulu, Trevor Nelson, Stewart Copeland and Cece Sammy) and a public phone-in vote. Watson, a late arrival to the competition replacing Reeves's original partner Rick Astley, who had pulled out, took the crown despite the low scores awarded by the judges to their performances. Following the competition Reeves and Watson released a victory single, "Can't Help Falling in Love". Russell Watson was scheduled to defend his title in the 2007 series with a new celebrity partner, Loui Batley, but had to withdraw at the last minute because of serious health problems.

Upon recovering, Watson returned to the recording studio to finish his album That's Life. Originally due out in November 2006, it was subsequently released on 5 March 2007. On the advice of his doctors, his latest UK tour, which had been due to start in late October 2006, was also postponed until March 2007 to coincide with the album release. The rescheduled tour met with huge approval throughout the country, with night after night of standing ovations to a visibly moved Watson. On 19 May 2007, Watson sang the "God Save the Queen" at the 2007 FA Cup Final.

He released his sixth studio album, Outside In, on 26 November 2007.

=== 2008-2014: Autobiography, Last Choir Standing and touring ===
On 5 June 2008 Watson released his autobiography Finding My Voice.

Watson appeared as a judge on the talent show Last Choir Standing, which was broadcast on BBC One beginning 5 July 2008. His album People Get Ready, containing easy listening, rock and soul music standards, was released on 17 November 2008. He performed at the Strictly Come Dancing Christmas Special 2008 on 25 December 2008, and at the BBC's New Year Live 2008 programme from HMS Belfast on the Thames on New Year's Eve. In April and May 2009, Watson undertook a 20-date tour of the UK backed by Liverpool's Sense of Sound, who came to his attention after they performed in the BBC's Last Choir Standing. In July 2009, he performed at the opening ceremony of the World Games 2009 in Kaohsiung, Taiwan.

Watson was one of the principal singers (in the role of Karl-Oskar) in the English world premiere of the Swedish musical Kristina från Duvemåla (Kristina from Duvemåla) by Benny Andersson and Björn Ulvaeus at Carnegie Hall in New York on 23 and 24 September 2009. He and his female lead Helen Sjöholm were praised by music critic Stephen Holden as having "first-rate poperetta voices, with Mr. Watson's Puccini-ready tenor the more operatic. Each brings down the house at least once." He reprised the role in the UK premiere of the musical in concert at the Royal Albert Hall in London on 14 April 2010.

In March/April 2014, Watson went on tour around the UK with his 'Only One Man' tour with the Arts Symphonic Orchestra, Arts Voices and Robert D.C. Emery conducting.

=== 2020–present: I'm A Celebrity, Chicago and collaborations with Aled Jones ===
In November 2020, Watson appeared on the twentieth series of I'm a Celebrity...Get Me Out of Here!. He was eliminated fifth, coming in eighth place overall.

In November 2021, Watson appeared on ITV1 gameshow The Chase. That same month, it was announced that Watson had joined the cast of a nationwide UK tour of Chicago as Billy Flynn. The tour began in February 2022 in Liverpool.

On 15 June 2022, Watson performed at Bridgewater Hall, in Manchester, for a charity concert in aid of the Teenage Cancer Trust. On 30 August 2022, it was announced that ITV had commissioned a one-off I'm a Celebrity...Get Me Out of Here! special of The Masked Singer, would air on 6 November 2022, ahead of the launch show for the 2022 series. Watson sang "Go the Distance" and was disguised as "Cockroach".

On 11 November 2022, Watson and Aled Jones released the album Christmas with Aled and Russell. The album debuted at number 1 on the Classical Artists Albums Chart and number 14 on the main albums chart. The album was preceded by two singles; the first, "A Spaceman Came Travelling", was released on 21 October 2022. The second single, "O Holy Night", was released on 4 November 2022. The duo toured the UK in November and December 2022. On speaking about releasing Christmas with Aled and Russell, Watson said "[Aled]'s synonymous with Christmas [...] whereas all this is new to me – I've never actually released a Christmas album. I've released albums at Christmas but the subject has never been 'Christmas', so I'm really excited about this. And I think it will give people a nice, warm feeling; the melancholy and the memories that Christmas brings back." In September 2023, Watson revealed that he had recorded a special medley to be released on his death, with all royalties from the recording to benefit the Worldwide Cancer Research charity. Watson said, "Leaving this track in my will to support the pioneering work for new cancer cures is hopefully a powerful reminder of the legacy we can all leave behind. The compilation was created to remove the taboo around post-life planning and shine a light on how leaving a will "can touch the lives of others'".

On 13 September 2024, Watson released the single "Shine", alongside Helen Jane Long. On 25 November 2024, the pair released the single "You (A Christmas Wish)". On 22 August 2025, they released a radio mix of "Unremember" as a single.

== Critical reception ==
Some critics have said that Watson's untrained tenor voice is not up to operatic standards; Rupert Christiansen, music critic of The Daily Telegraph has, for instance, called him a "karaoke crooner". Watson has responded that it "[d]oesn't bother me. Seven years ago classical crossover didn't exist – putting Italian lyrics to pop songs in a big ballsy way. Now every bugger's doing it. I've transcended all that bickering and bitching." Watson's career ambition is "[l]ongevity, that's the most important thing. I want to be a musical force for a good long while."

== Personal life ==
Watson has two daughters from his first marriage to Helen Watson. The couple divorced in 2002. In his autobiography, Finding My Voice, Watson wrote "This belief that fame stepped in, swelled my head and made me leave Helen in the lurch isn't true [...] We were a warring couple, arguing about the same things that every other couple does [...] We fought before the split, we fought during the divorce and, just for good measure, we fought afterwards too."

In August 2015 Watson married his girlfriend and fiancée of five years, Louise Harris, in Spain.

Watson lives in Congleton.

Watson was made a Doctor of Arts when he received an honorary doctorate from the University of Chester in 2025

=== First brain tumour ===
In 2005, Watson began having headaches, which he described as "like a knife being pressed into the bridge of my nose." He consulted a specialist, who told him there was nothing to worry about as he was suffering from stress and should find ways of relaxing. When his peripheral vision began to be affected in late 2006, he visited another specialist, who also said he was suffering from stress. Watson told him, "The only thing that's stressing me is this pain in my head."

In September 2006, Watson flew to Los Angeles to record his album That's Life. On the flight, he told his producer that he was experiencing terrible pressure inside his skull. When they landed, his producer suggested a game of tennis to clear his head. Watson could not see the ball at all. After a visit to the Cedars-Sinai Medical Center and an MRI scan, he was advised that he had a developing pituitary adenoma, which was the size of two golf balls. According to Watson, "Since an early age I've had an in-built premonition, a vision that I wouldn't make 40. For the previous seven years I'd have a recurring nightmare in which my head exploded. And here I was with a brain tumour on the eve of my 40th birthday; I thought, 'This is it, I was right, I knew it'." Watson recalled that the tumours were "like a figure of eight, one filling the frontal cavity of my skull, the other forced through into the top of my nose." He stayed in Los Angeles for two days and continued recording his album while tests confirmed whether the tumour was malignant or not – it turned out to be benign.

Watson then returned to the UK, and had a five-hour emergency operation to remove the eight-centimetre lump at St George's Hospital in Tooting, South London, in September 2006. As the tumour was pressing against his optic nerve, the surgeon removed the tumour through his nose.

After the operation, Watson could barely walk, and the tumour had affected his pituitary gland which controls hormone levels: "My mood swings went from ecstatic to suicidal. I remember one night standing on the balcony, full of dark thoughts and self-pity, thinking 'God, this is f**king terrible, why me?' I went back to bed, couldn't sleep, got up again. I thought I'd had enough. If it hadn't been for the girls [his daughters]..." His energy levels were very low and he did not leave his house for two months: "I couldn't deal with more than one person at a time or with multitasking and I cried easily." Watson was readmitted to hospital in Manchester for tests on 6 October 2006 after complaining of dizziness, headaches and blurred vision. He has been reported as saying, "It [his first pituitary tumour] changed my priorities. Made me appreciate the importance of relationships, of friends and family and, most of all, my two daughters. My fear for them if I died—that was the worst part. I adore them".

=== Second tumour ===
While in the middle of the studio recording of his album Outside In on 24 October 2007 Watson suddenly became incapacitated, with multiple symptoms including a dramatic deterioration of vision. An MRI scan showed he had a regrowth of his tumour with bleeding into his brain. He underwent emergency surgery to remove the tumour at the Alexandra Hospital in Cheadle, Greater Manchester, and was for a while in a critical condition in the hospital's Intensive Therapy Unit. Watson was discharged from hospital on 31 October. Watson later underwent an extensive rehabilitation programme including radiotherapy at the Christie Hospital in Manchester.

Once Watson finished radiotherapy in 2008 he decided to embark on a return to music. He soon found that his treatment had given him not just a fresh outlook on the world, but a new, deeper, richer voice. "The tumour could have been growing for 10–15 years in my nasal cavity, so when I had cut it out I went from a V8 to a V12!"

== Discography ==
=== Studio albums ===
- The Voice (2000)
- Encore (2001)
- Reprise (2002)
- Amore Musica (2004)
- That's Life (2007)
- Outside In (2007)
- People Get Ready (2008)
- La Voce (2010)
- Anthems – Music to Inspire a Nation (2012)
- Only One Man (2013)
- True Stories (2016)
- In Harmony (2018) – with Aled Jones
- Back in Harmony (2019) – with Aled Jones
- Christmas with Aled and Russell (2022) – with Aled Jones
- Shine (2024) – with Helen Jane Long

== Published works ==
- Watson, Russell (2008). Finding My Voice. London: Ebury Press. ISBN 978-0-09-192291-7.
