= Reprise (Russell Watson album) =

Studio album by Russell Watson
- Released: 26 November 2002
- Recorded: 2002
- Genre: Crossover
- Label: Decca
- Producer: Nick Patrick

Russell Watson chronology
Encore (2001)	Reprise (2002)	Amore Musica (2004)

Professional ratings
Review scores
Source	Rating
AllMusic	3/5 stars

Reprise is the third album by British tenor Russell Watson released in 2002.

== Track listing ==
Composers/librettists and/or songwriters in brackets

1. "Torna a Surriento" (Ernesto De Curtis/Giambattista De Curtis) – 4:48
2. "Granada" (Agustín Lara) – 4:03
3. "Santa Lucia" (Teodoro Cottrau) – 4:01
4. "That's Amore" (Harry Warren/Jack Brooks) – 3:10
5. "Ave Maria" (Franz Schubert) – 4:34
6. "Questa o Quella" (Giuseppe Verdi) – 2:01
7. "Nothing Sacred" (Jim Steinman/Don Black) – 4:07
8. "The Pearl Fishers' Duet" (Georges Bizet/Eugène Cormon/Michel Carré) – 5:03
9. "Pourquoi Me réveiller?" (Jules Massenet/Édouard Blau/Paul Milliet/Georges Hartmann) – 2:35
10. "Recondita armonia" (Giacomo Puccini/Luigi Illica/Giuseppe Giacosa) – 2:52
11. "La Danza" (Gioachino Rossini/Carlo Pepoli) – 3:19
12. "Core 'ngrato" (Salvatore Cardillo/Riccardo Cordiferro) – 6:45
13. "The Living Years" (Mike Rutherford/B. A. Robertson) – 5:49
14. "I Don't Know How I Got By" (Diane Warren) – 3:39
15. "The Best That Love Can Be" (Chris De Burgh) – 4:03
16. "Bohemian Rhapsody" (Freddie Mercury) – 6:38
17. "Vesti la Giubba" (Ruggero Leoncavallo) – 2:48

== Charts ==
Chart performance for Reprise
Chart (2002–2003)	Peak position
Australian Albums (ARIA)	11
Irish Albums (IRMA)	55
New Zealand Albums (RMNZ)	6
UK Albums (OCC)	13
US Top Classical Albums (Billboard)	6
