= Cleo Higgins =

British R&B/soul/pop singer, dancer and songwriter

- Also known as: Cleopatra Higgins
- Born: Cleopatra Madonna Higgins
- Origin: Manchester, England
- Genres: R&B; pop; soul
- Occupations: Singer; songwriter; dancer
- Years active: 1998–present
- Member of: Cleopatra
- Website: cleohiggins.com

Cleopatra Madonna "Cleo" Higgins is a British R&B/soul/pop singer, dancer and songwriter based in Manchester, England. Higgins is the lead singer of the eponymously named sister girl group, Cleopatra.

== Music career ==
=== Early career ===
In 2000, Higgins branched out from Cleopatra and recorded two duets with tenor Russell Watson. The first song, "Someone Like You", was featured on Watson's multi-platinum debut album The Voice, which climbed to No. 1 on the U.S. classical charts. Higgins and Watson performed the song both on tour and on the National Lottery and they collaborated a second time, recording another duet called "The Best That Love Can Be" for Watson's third album, Reprise.

In 2001, Higgins headlined the Young Voices in Concert tour, performing at the Manchester Arena in front of 15,000 people as she and almost 7,000 choir members set a new Guinness World Record for the largest choir assembled in the UK. The performance was aired on the BBC's long-standing programme Songs of Praise. In 2002 Higgins participated in ITV1's Songs of Bond, a tribute to the songs of James Bond, where she covered "For Your Eyes Only".

In 2007 Higgins released her pilot solo single, "Feelin' Like This".

=== 2013: The Voice UK ===
In 2013, Higgins auditioned for The Voice UK and her Blind Audition was shown in April 2013. All of the coaches turned around and she chose Will.i.am's team. In the Battle round, Will.i.am kept Higgins over duo Nu-tarna. In the Knockout round Will.i.am then kept Higgins over both Lem and John. Higgins competed in the quarter-finals against both Leah and Leanne with Will.i.am giving Leah his fast pass while Higgins was voted through by the public.

During the course of the show, there were rumours that Will.i.am did not enjoy working with her, which she claimed were untrue. Higgins was eliminated at the semi-final stage when she performed against Leah McFall for the public vote. Will.i.am used the opportunity to dispel rumours of a rift, telling Higgins live on television, "You are an amazing artist. I would love to work with you".

Performances

Competition Stage	Broadcast Date	Song	Original Artist	Result
Blind Audition	Saturday 13 April 2013	"Love on Top"	Beyoncé	Joined Team Will
Battle Rounds	Saturday 11 May 2013	"Finally" (against Nu-Tarna)	CeCe Peniston	Advanced
Knockout Rounds	Saturday 1 June 2013	"Leave Me Alone"	Michael Jackson	Advanced
Live Quarter Finals	Friday 7 June 2013	"Imagine"	John Lennon	Bottom two
Live Semi-finals	Saturday 15 June 2013	"Don't Let Go (Love)"	En Vogue	Eliminated

=== Tours and later performances ===
Higgins has toured with Joe Budden, Russell Watson, Jagged Edge, Blue, and Girls Aloud, and covered Kym Sims' "Too Blind To See It".

In February 2023 Higgins led "The Aretha Franklin Story", performed with other Night Owl Productions musicians and singers at the Regal Theatre, Adelaide, Australia, as part of the Adelaide Fringe.

== Other activities ==
Higgins has also worked as a brand ambassador for CoverGirl.

== Discography ==
=== Singles ===
Year	Title	Peak chart positions	Album
Year	Title	UK	Album
2007	"Feelin' Like This"	—	Non-album singles
2013	"Imagine"	—	Non-album singles
2013	"Don't Let Go (Love)"	92	Non-album singles
"—" denotes release that did not chart or was not released.
