= Sash! discography =

- Studio albums: 6
- Compilation albums: 3
- Singles: 26

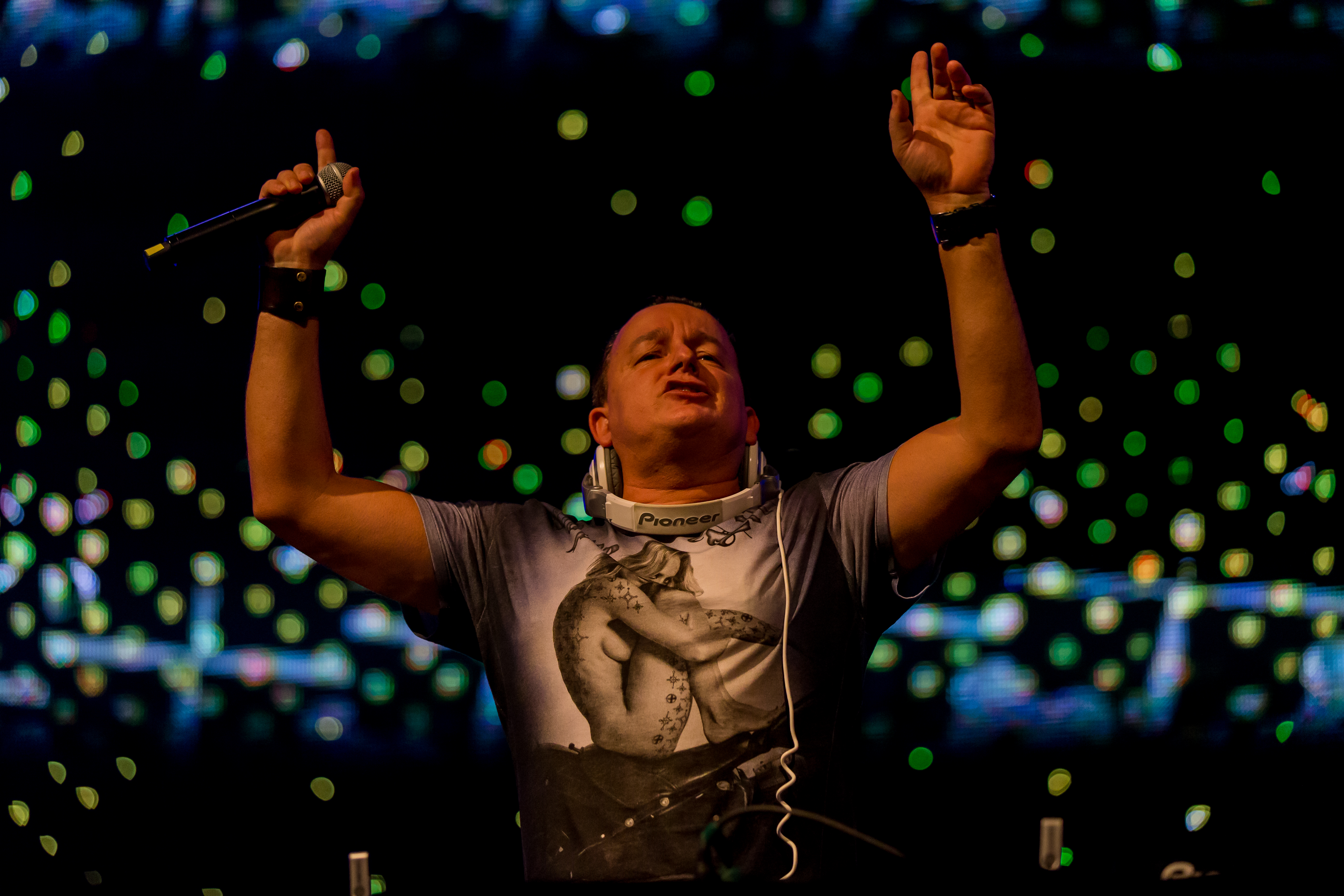

The discography of Sash!, a German DJ/production team. In 1996, Sash! released "It's My Life", which became a European club hit. In 1997, with Sabine Ohmes as the singer, Sash! released "Encore Une Fois" which reached number two in the UK Singles Chart, as well as reaching the top 10 in many other countries. Follow-up singles "Ecuador" and "Stay", both also reached number two in the UK. In 1998, Sash! released the first single from his second album, "La Primavera", which reached number three, "Mysterious Times", which reached number two, and "Move Mania". The following year, "Colour the World" reached number fifteen.

In 2000, "Adelante" was released from the new album "Trilenium", and it reached number two. "Just Around the Hill" and "With My Own Eyes", were also released in that year. "Together Again" was the last single from the album, but was only released in Spain and Denmark. In 2002, Sash! released his fourth album S4 Sash!, which produced the singles "Ganbareh", "Run" (which featured Boy George), and "I Believe" (which had the vocals of TJ Davis). In 2007, Sash! released an album called 10th Anniversary which reached number nine on the UK Album Chart. In 2008 Sash! released "Raindrops (Encore Une Fois)", a collaboration with Stunt, and it reached number nine in the UK. In June 2024, a vinyl compilation was released by Dutch record label Music On Vinyl, titled "The Best Of", using the same artwork as the 2008 edition, but with a completely different track list as the original CD release. Another version was released in August. All versions were sold out soon after release in most places, including their official store.

== Albums ==
=== Studio albums ===
List of albums, with selected chart positions and certifications
Title	Album details	Peak chart positions										Certifications
Title	Album details	GER	AUS	FIN	FRA	NLD	NZ	NOR	SWE	SWI	UK	Certifications
It's My Life – The Album	Released: June 1997; Label: PolyGram; Format: CD, cassette	38	82	4	—	32	11	19	12	37	6	UK: Platinum
Life Goes On	Released: 17 August 1998; Label: PolyGram; Format: CD, cassette	31	35	8	—	24	12	5	11	37	5	UK: Gold
Trilenium	Released: 22 May 2000; Label: Edel; Format: CD, cassette	43	18	9	73	—	24	18	14	43	13	
S4!Sash!	Released: 11 November 2002; Label: Redbeat; Format: CD, digital download	—	—	—	—	—	—	—	—	—	—	
Life Is a Beach	Released: 31 August 2012; Label: Tokapi Recordings; Format: CD, digital download	—	—	—	—	—	—	—	—	—	—	
Life Changes	Released: 8 November 2013; Label: Tokapi Recordings; Format: CD, digital download	—	—	—	—	—	—	—	—	—	—	
"—" denotes album that did not chart or was not released

=== Compilation albums ===
Title	Album details	Peak chart positions				
Title	Album details	GER	AUS	FIN	NZ	UK
Encore Une Fois – The Greatest Hits	Released: 30 October 2000; Label: Multiply; Format: CD, cassette	62	63	29	38	33
10th Anniversary	Released: 12 February 2007; Label: Multiply; Formats: CD, digital download	—	—	—	—	—
The Best Of	Released: October 2008; Label: Hard2Beat; Formats: CD, digital download	—	—	—	—	9
The Best Of	Released: 21 June 2024; Label: Music On Vinyl; Formats: LP	—	—	—	—	—
"—" denotes album that did not chart or was not released

== Singles ==
List of singles, with selected chart positions and certifications, showing year released and album name
Single	Year	Peak chart positions										Certifications	Album
Single	Year	GER	AUS	FIN	FRA	IRE	NLD	NOR	SWE	SWI	UK	Certifications	Album
"It's My Life"	1996	38	—	—	—	—	—	—	—	—	—		It's My Life – The Album
"Encore une fois" (featuring Sabine Ohmes)	1997	16	35	5	7	1	14	4	6	13	2	FRA: Silver; UK: Platinum	It's My Life – The Album
"Ecuador" (featuring Rodriguez)	1997	7	52	3	12	4	8	4	4	8	2	FRA: Silver; SWE: Gold; UK: Gold	It's My Life – The Album
"Stay" (featuring La Trec)	1997	12	24	6	23	6	9	3	12	19	2	NOR: Gold; UK: Gold	It's My Life – The Album
"La Primavera"	1998	13	36	2	15	5	22	2	10	15	3	SWE: Gold; UK: Silver	Life Goes On
"Mysterious Times" (featuring Tina Cousins)	1998	17	62	8	16	11	17	5	17	23	2	FRA: Silver; SWE: Gold; UK: Silver	Life Goes On
"Move Mania" (featuring Shannon)	1998	56	—	10	61	15	40	—	33	—	8		Life Goes On
"Colour the World" (featuring Dr. Alban)	1999	39	—	—	73	—	69	—	54	39	15		Life Goes On
"Ma Baker" (vs. Boney M)	1999	28	—	6	—	—	34	—	10	21	22		20th Century Hits
"Adelante" (featuring Peter Faulhammer & Rodriguez)	2000	17	4	—	37	11	49	7	7	18	2	AUS: Gold; SWE: Platinum; UK: Silver	Trilenium
"Just Around the Hill" (featuring Tina Cousins)	2000	64	26	16	55	30	60	—	30	51	8		Trilenium
"With My Own Eyes" (featuring Inka Auhagen)	2000	46	39	—	—	28	—	—	51	82	10		Trilenium
"Together Again" (featuring Blå Øjne)	2000	—	—	—	—	—	—	—	—	—	—		Trilenium
"Ganbareh" (featuring Mikio)	2002	43	43	—	—	—	—	—	—	94	—		S4!Sash!
"Run" (featuring Boy George)	2002	48	—	—	—	—	—	—	—	98	—		S4!Sash!
"I Believe" (featuring TJ Davis)	2002	67	63	—	—	—	—	—	—	—	—		S4!Sash!
"Ecuador Reloaded" (featuring Rodriguez)	2007	—	—	—	—	—	—	—	—	—	89		10th Anniversary
"Mysterious Times Reloaded" (featuring Tina Cousins)	2007	—	—	—	—	—	—	—	—	—	128		10th Anniversary
"Raindrops (Encore Une Fois)" (featuring Stunt)	2008	51	—	—	—	26	49	—	—	—	9		The Best Of
"All Is Love" (featuring Jessy)	2010	—	—	—	—	—	—	—	—	—	—		Non Album Single
"Mirror Mirror" (featuring Jean Pearl)	2011	—	—	—	—	—	—	—	—	—	—		Non Album Single
"What Is Life"	2012	—	—	—	—	—	—	—	—	—	—		Life Is A Beach
"The Secret" (featuring Sarah Brightman)	2013	—	—	—	—	—	—	—	—	—	—		Life Is A Beach
"Summer's Gone" (featuring Tony T.)	2013	—	—	—	—	—	—	—	—	—	—		Life Changes
"Can't Change You" (featuring Plexihones)	2014	—	—	—	—	—	—	—	—	—	—		Life Changes
"Coming Home" (featuring Shayne Ward)	2021	—	—	—	—	—	—	—	—	—	— (Note: "Coming Home" did not enter the Official Singles Chart, but peaked at number ninety-five on the Official Singles Downloads Chart.)		Non Album Singles
"Walking the Wire" (featuring Christina Novelli)	2021	—	—	—	—	—	—	—	—	—	—		Non Album Singles
"Rainbow" (featuring Nicole Scholz)	2022	—	—	—	—	—	—	—	—	—	—		Non Album Singles
"Never Be Alone" (with Gabry Ponte)	2022	—	—	—	—	—	—	—	—	—	—		Non Album Singles
"Rock My Body" (with R3hab and Inna)	2023	—	—	—	32	—	9	—	— (Note: "Rock My Body" did not enter the Swedish Singellista Chart, but peaked at number three on the Swedish Heatseeker Chart.)	—	—		Non Album Singles
