= The Best Of (Sash! album) =

Greatest hits album by Sash!
- Released: 20 October 2008
- Recorded: 1997–2008
- Length: 2:17:07
- Label: Hard2Beat H2BCD02
- Producer: SASH!, Tokapi

Sash! chronology
| 10th Anniversary (2007) | The Best Of (2008) | Life Is a Beach (2012) |

The Best Of is a greatest hits album by German DJ Sash!. It was released by Hard2Beat on 20 October 2008. It's a double album, including all of Sash!'s celebrated hits (on the first disc) and 12 remixes from four different songs (on the second disc).

== Track listing ==
CD 1
| No. | Title | Taken from | Length |
|---|---|---|---|
| 1. | "Encore Une Fois (Blunt Radio Edit)" (featuring Sabine Ohmes) | It's My Life – The Album | 3:50 |
| 2. | "Ecuador" (featuring Adrian Rodriguez) | It's My Life – The Album | 3:35 |
| 3. | "Stay" (featuring La Trec) | It's My Life – The Album | 3:32 |
| 4. | "La Primavera" (featuring Patrizia Salvatore) | Life Goes On | 3:37 |
| 5. | "Mysterious Times" (featuring Tina Cousins) | Life Goes On | 3:34 |
| 6. | "Move Mania" (featuring Shannon) | Life Goes On | 3:49 |
| 7. | "Colour the World" (featuring Dr. Alban & Inka Auhagen) | Life Goes On | 3:38 |
| 8. | "Adelante" (featuring Adrian Rodriguez and Peter Faulhammer) | Trilenium | 3:35 |
| 9. | "Just Around the Hill (Dance Radio Edit)" (featuring Tina Cousins) | Trilenium | 3:42 |
| 10. | "With My Own Eyes" (featuring Inka Auhagen) | Trilenium | 3:43 |
| 11. | "Ganbareh" (featuring Mikio) | S4!Sash! | 3:51 |
| 12. | "Run" (featuring Boy George) | S4!Sash! | 3:55 |
| 13. | "I Believe" (TJ Davis) | S4!Sash! | 3:51 |
| 14. | "It's My Life" (The Very First Single) | It's My Life – The Album | 3:18 |
| 15. | "Raindrops (Encore Une Fois) (Kindervater Edit)" (featuring Stunt) | | 2:56 |
| 16. | "Raindrops (Encore Une Fois) (Fonzerelli Re-Work)" (featuring Stunt) | | 2:59 |
| 17. | "Just Around the Hill (Radio/Video Edit)" (featuring Tina Cousins) | Trilenium | 3:32 |
| Total length: | | | 60:57 |

CD 2
| No. | Title | Taken from | Length |
|---|---|---|---|
| 1. | "Ecuador" (Javi Mula & Joan Reyes Remix) | It's My Life – The Album | 6:18 |
| 2. | "Ecuador" (Will Bailey & Calvertron Remix) | It's My Life – The Album | 6:14 |
| 3. | "Ecuador" (Bad Behaviour Remix) | It's My Life – The Album | 6:23 |
| 4. | "Stay" (Cedric Gervais Vocal Remix) | It's My Life – The Album | 7:05 |
| 5. | "Stay" (Fonzerelli Re-Work) | It's My Life – The Album | 6:47 |
| 6. | "Stay" (Bass Slammers Remix) | It's My Life – The Album | 5:26 |
| 7. | "La Primavera" (Static Shokx Remix) | Life Goes On | 5:25 |
| 8. | "La Primavera" (Twocker’s Popcorn Remix) | Life Goes On | 7:07 |
| 9. | "La Primavera" (3Style Remix) | Life Goes On | 6:43 |
| 10. | "Mysterious Times" (7th Heaven Remix) | Life Goes On | 6:50 |
| 11. | "Mysterious Times" (Spencer & Hill Remix) | Life Goes On | 6:16 |
| 12. | "Mysterious Times" (Sound Selektaz Club Mix) | Life Goes On | 5:35 |
| Total length: | | | 76:10 |

== Personnel ==
- SASH! – producer
- Tokapi – producer
- Written by: Ralf Kappmeier, Thomas Alisson, Sascha Lappessen
- Features/Vocals by: Sabine Ohmes, Rodriguez, La Trec, Patrizia, Tina Cousins, Shannon, Dr. Alban, Inka, Peter Faulhammer, Boy George, T.J. Davis, Sarah Brightman, Stunt
- Remixes by: Kindevater, Fonzerelli, Javi Mula, Joan Reyes, Will Bailey, Calvertron, Bad Behaviour, Cedric Gervais, Bass Clammers, Static Shokx, Twocker, 3 Style, 7th Heaven, Spencer & Hill, Sound Selekataz

== Chart performance ==
- The album reached #9 on the UK album chart in 2008.
- 300,000 copies sold in less than three months in the UK and achieved platinum status.

== Notes ==
There is also an Extended Edition of the album, containing extended versions of the first 13 tracks of the first disc. This edition was only available from the iTunes Store.
