= Encore Une Fois – The Greatest Hits =

Greatest hits album by Sash!
- Released: October 30, 2000
- Label: Multiply MULTYCD10

Sash! chronology
Trilenium (2000)	Encore Une Fois – The Greatest Hits (2000)	S4!Sash! (2002)

Encore Une Fois – The Greatest Hits is the first greatest hits album released by German dance act Sash! It was released on October 30, 2000, through the Multiply Records label. It includes the singles released from the previous three albums, extra album tracks, and a 17-minute 'megamix' of the singles mixed by Oliver Momm. The CD also includes a bonus disc of remixes of the tracks by various artists. The album reached number 33 on the UK Albums Chart, and number 62 in Germany.

== Track listing ==
=== Disc 1: The Greatest Hits ===
1. "Encore Une Fois (Future Breeze edit)" – 3:39
2. "Ecuador" – 3:34
3. "Stay" – 3:32
4. "La Primavera" – 3:38
5. "Mysterious Times" – 3:41
6. "Move Mania" – 3:53
7. "Colour The World" – 3:38
8. "Adelante" – 3:44
9. "Just Around The Hill" – 3:32
10. "With My Own Eyes" – 3:44
11. "It's My Life" – 6:16
12. "Sweat" – 5:17
13. "Little River" – 3:23
14. "Multiply Teaser" – 5:39
15. "Together Again" – 3:43
16. "Oliver Momm's Hitmix" – 17:09

=== Disc 2: Oliver Momm's Remix Combination ===
1. "Intro"
2. "Mysterious Times" (Todd Terry's club mix)
3. "Move Mania" (DJ Delicious remix)
4. "Move Mania" (Morel & Bristol Da Boom mix)
5. "Ecuador" (DJ Sneak remix)
6. "With My Own Eyes" (Roy Malone's king mix)
7. "Colour the World" (Dario G remix)
8. "Stay" (Armand Van Helden remix)
9. "It's My Life" (NBG remix)
10. "Ecuador" (Klubheads remix)
11. "Encore une fois" (Future Breeze remix)
12. "La Primavera" (Blank & Jones remix)
13. "Adelante" (Cosmic Gate remix)
14. "Just Around the Hill" (Doug Laurent vocal mix)
15. "Colour the World" (ATB remix)

== Charts ==
Chart performance for Encore Une Fois – The Greatest Hits
Chart (2000)	Peak position
Australian Albums (ARIA)	63
Danish Albums (Hitlisten)	8
Finnish Albums (Suomen virallinen lista)	29
German Albums (Offizielle Top 100)	62
Irish Albums (IRMA)	51
New Zealand Albums (RMNZ)	38
UK Albums (OCC)	33
