= 10th Anniversary (Sash! album) =

Greatest hits album by Sash!
- Released: 25 October 2007
- Recorded: 1997–2007
- Label: Blanco Y Negro; MASCOLCD 006
- Producer: Sash!, Tokapi

Sash! chronology
| S4!Sash! (2002) | 10th Anniversary (2007) | The Best of (2008) |

10th Anniversary is a greatest hits album by German DJ Sash! released on 25 October 2007 through Blanco Y Negro label. The record includes 16 hit singles, a reloaded version of Ecuador, previously unreleased songs, plus a bonus DVD including videoclips to all the songs from the album.

== Track listing ==
=== CD 1 ===
All tracks are written by Ralf Kappmeier, Thomas Alisson, Sascha Lappessen

| No. | Title | Featured Guest(s) | Length |
|---|---|---|---|
| 1. | "Encore Une Fois" (Future Breeze Edit) | Sabine Ohmes | 3:37 |
| 2. | "Ecuador" (Single Edit) | Rodriguez | 3:33 |
| 3. | "Stay" (Single Edit) | La Trec | 3:30 |
| 4. | "La Primavera" (Single Edit) | Patrizia Salvatore | 3:34 |
| 5. | "Mysterious Times" (Single Edit) | Tina Cousins | 3:39 |
| 6. | "Move Mania" (Single Edit) | Shannon | 3:50 |
| 7. | "Colour The World" (Single Edit) | Dr. Alban | 3:36 |
| 8. | "Adelante" (Single Edit) | Rodriguez and Peter Faulhammer | 3:42 |
| 9. | "Just Around The Hill" (Single Edit) | Tina Cousins | 3:31 |
| 10. | "With My Own Eyes" (Single Edit) | Inka | 3:40 |
| 11. | "Ganbareh" (Single Edit) | Mikio | 3:47 |
| 12. | "Run" (Single Edit) | Boy George | 3:53 |
| 13. | "I Believe" (Single Edit) | TJ Davis | 3:48 |
| 14. | "It's My Life" (The Very First Single) | | 3:18 |
| 15. | "Ecuador Reloaded" (Single Edit) | Rodriguez | 3:47 |
| 16. | "Ecuador Reloaded" (Samba Edit) | Rodriguez | 3:39 |
| 17. | "The Secret 2007" (Single Edit) | Sarah Brightman | 3:20 |
| 18. | "Just Around..." (Trance ChillOut Mix) | | 5:27 |
| 19. | "Now It's Time" (Unreleased) | | 4:44 |
| 20. | "Club Dance Only" (Unreleased) | | 3:36 |

*Note: Track listing for first 10 songs is the same as Encore Une Fois - The Greatest Hits from 2000.

=== CD 2 ===
| No. | Title | Length |
|---|---|---|
| 1. | "Encore Une Fois" (Video (Original Edit) |
| 2. | "Ecuador" (Video) |
| 3. | "Stay" (Video) |
| 4. | "La Primavera" (Video) |
| 5. | "Mysterious Times" (Video) |
| 6. | "Move Mania" (Video) |
| 7. | "Colour The World" (Video) |
| 8. | "Adelante" (Video) |
| 9. | "Just Around The Hill" (Video) |
| 10. | "With My Own Eyes" (Video) |
| 11. | "Ganbareh" (Video) |
| 12. | "Run" (Video) |
| 13. | "I Believe" (Video) |
| 14. | "The 'Privat Making Of's'" |
| 15. | "Discography" |
| 16. | "Biography" |
| 17. | "Privat Video Material" |
| 18. | "Picture Slide Show 1" |
| 19. | "Picture Slide Show 2" |

== Credits ==
- Lyrics by Ralf Kappmeier (tracks: CD1 to CD11, CD13 to CD20), Sascha Lappessen (tracks: CD1 to CD11, CD13 to CD20), Thomas Alisson (tracks: CD1 to CD11, CD13 to CD20)
- Music by Ralf Kappmeier, Sascha Lappessen, Thomas Alisson
- Producer – Sash!, Tokapi
- Featurings/vocals by Sabine Ohmes, Rodriguez, La Trec, Patrizia, Tina Cousins, Shannon, Dr. Alban, Inka, Peter Faulhammer, Boy George, T.J. Davis, Sarah Brightman
