= Change of life =

Change of life may refer to:

- Menopause, a life stage in women
- "Change of Life" (Eureka Seven), 2006 episode
- "Change of Life" (The Goodies), 1982 episode

== See also ==
- Change My Life, a 1988 album by Snowy White
- Change My Life (Epic Soundtracks album), 1996
- Change of Our Lives, a 2013 Australian film
- Change Your Life (disambiguation)
- Life Changes (disambiguation)
