= Trilenium =

Studio album by Sash!
- Released: April 2000
- Recorded: 1998–2000
- Length: 60:06
- Label: X-IT
- Producer: Sash!, Tokapi

Sash! chronology
Life Goes On (1998)	Trilenium (2000)	Encore Une Fois – The Greatest Hits (2000)

Singles from Trilenium
- 1. "Adelante" Released: 6 December 1999; 2. "Just Around The Hill" Released: 4 February 2000; 3. "With My Own Eyes" Released: 4 September 2000; 4. "Together Again" Released: November 2000

Professional ratings
Review scores
Source	Rating
AllMusic	2/5 stars

Trilenium is the third studio album released by the German DJ Sash!. The record was released in April 2000 via X-IT. The album did not match the success of Sash!'s first two records, peaking at number 13 on the UK Albums Chart.

== Overview ==
Trilenium was released in April 2000, six months after the successful single "Adelante" (UK No. 2). At the time of release, the ballad "Just Around the Hill" had just been released. The title refers to the fuss around the year 2000 of the millennium bug.

The album features many vocalists who have previously collaborated with the group, including Tina Cousins ("Mysterious Times"), Adrian Rodriguez ("Ecuador"), and Sabine Ohmes ("Encore Une Fois"). Most songs on Trilenium were dance-pop style tracks comparable to previous singles "Colour The World" and "Mysterious Times". While older Sash! albums consisted of mainly trance/techno tracks with some pop tracks, Trilenium was the opposite.

== Track listing ==
1. "Rock the Block" (with Michael "Ameer" Williams & Deborah Cameron)
2. "Adelante" (with Adrian Rodriguez & Peter Faulhammer)
3. "With My Own Eyes" (with Inka Auhagen)
4. "Show Me the Right Way" (with Ricardo De Tornato)
5. "Le Soleil Noir" (with Sabine Ohmes)
6. "Just Around the Hill" (with Tina Cousins)
7. "Tell Me Now" (with Ca$h)
8. "Trilenium"
9. "Halleluja" (with Deborah Cameron & Ca$h)
10. "Together Again" (with Blå Øjne)
11. "Destination Unknown"
12. "Multiply Teaser"
13. "My Kind of Blues"
14. "Chill Out No. 1"

== Personnel ==
- Lyrics by Peter Faulhammer (tracks: 2), Adrian Rodriguez (tracks: 2), Sabine Ohmes (tracks: 5)
- Music and lyrics by Dieter Bohlen
- Photography by Manfred Esser
- Produced by Sash!, Tokapi

== Charts ==
Chart performance for Trilenium
Chart (2000)	Peak position
Australian Albums (ARIA)	18
Belgian Albums (Ultratop Flanders)	45
Belgian Albums (Ultratop Wallonia)	42
Finnish Albums (Suomen virallinen lista)	9
French Albums (SNEP)	73
German Albums (Offizielle Top 100)	43
Hungarian Albums (MAHASZ)	12
New Zealand Albums (RMNZ)	24
Norwegian Albums (VG-lista)	18
Swedish Albums (Sverigetopplistan)	14
Swiss Albums (Schweizer Hitparade)	43
UK Albums (OCC)	13
