= Move Mania =

1998 single by Sash!

Single by Sash! featuring Shannon

from the album Life Goes On
- Released: 2 November 1998
- Length: 3:47
- Label: Club Tools; X-It; Edel
- Songwriters: Sascha Lappessen; Ralf Kappmeier; Thomas Alisson
- Producers: Sash!; Tokapi

Sash! singles chronology
"Mysterious Times" (1998)	"Move Mania" (1998)	"Ma Baker" (1998)

Shannon singles chronology
"Stronger Together" (1985)	"Move Mania" (1998)

Music video
- "Move Mania" on YouTube

"Move Mania" is a song by German production group Sash! featuring American singer Shannon. It was released on 2 November 1998 through Club Tools and the Mighty label as the third single from their second studio album, Life Goes On (1998). The song is written by Sascha Lappessen, Ralf Kappmeier and Thomas Alisson, produced by Lappessen and Tokapi, and became a hit in several European countries. The accompanying music video was directed by Oliver Sommer and filmed in the US.

== Critical reception ==
Jon O'Brien from AllMusic stated that "disco diva" Shannon "adds a touch of class" to the "uplifting" song.

== Chart performance ==
"Move Mania" reached the top 10 in Finland (10), Italy (8), and the United Kingdom. In the UK, the single peaked at number eight in its first week at the UK Singles Chart, on 22 November 1998. It became a top-20 hit in Denmark and Ireland. On the Eurochart Hot 100, "Move Mania" peaked at number 23 in December 1998. In the US, it peaked at number 25 on the Billboard Dance Club Play chart.

== Music video ==
A music video was produced to promote the single, directed by Oliver Sommer and shot in the US. Filming took place in Manhattan in August 1998. Sommer had previously directed the videos for "Encore une fois", "Stay", "Ecuador" and "La Primavera".

== Track listing ==
All tracks are written by Ralph Kappmaier, Thomas Allison, Sascha Lappessen.

No.	Title	Length
1.	"Move Mania" (video/radio Mix)	3:47
2.	"Move Mania" (extended mix)	6:51
3.	"Move Mania" (John B. Norman Remix)	7:00
4.	"Move Mania" (DJ Delicious Radio Mix)	3:22
5.	"Move Mania" (DJ Delicious Remix)	6:52
6.	"Move Mania" (Horny Utd. Remix)	9:05
Total length:		36:57

== Credits ==
- Design – M. Kowalkowski
- Cover photography – Gaby Gerster
- Shannon photography – Judy Schiller
- Producer – Sash!, Tokapi
- Vocals – Shannon
- Written by Ralf Kappmeier, Sascha Lappessen, Thomas Alisson

== Charts ==
=== Weekly charts ===
Chart (1998–1999)	Peak position
Belgium (Ultratop 50 Flanders)	23
Belgium Dance (Ultratop)	10
Denmark (IFPI)	17
Europe (Eurochart Hot 100)	23
Finland (Suomen virallinen lista)	10
France (SNEP)	61
Germany (GfK)	56
Ireland (IRMA)	15
Italy (Musica e dischi)	8
Netherlands (Dutch Top 40 Tipparade)	2
Netherlands (Single Top 100)	40
Scottish Singles Sales (Official Charts)	5
Sweden (Sverigetopplistan)	33
UK Singles (Official Charts)	8
US Dance Club Play (Billboard)	25

=== Year-end charts ===
Chart (1998)	Position
Romania (Romanian Top 100)	17
UK Singles (OCC)	128
