= Starstylers =

Dutch Eurodance project

- Origin: Netherlands
- Genres: Eurodance, House, Trance, Electro house
- Years active: 2005–present
- Members: Nils van Zandt (DJ NLSiO); Dorien Driessens; Robin Drost
- Website: starstylers.eu at the Wayback Machine (archived February 28, 2007)

Starstylers is a Dutch Eurodance music project. The group is composed of DJ NLSiO (Nils Van Zandt), singer Dorien Driessens of Gemert and Robin Drost.

== History ==
The first single of Starstylers, with the original singer of Michy, Michelle Lemmens, was "Keep On Moving". It was released in 2005 and became a hit in Europe. It features a sampling of the melody of the song "Ecuador", originally performed by the trio Sash!, which was popular in 1997.

In 2006, "Keep on Moving" was introduced in the Top 100 and reached the 14th position within two weeks. The song was found in the Top 10 list of many European countries, including Poland, Bulgaria, Cyprus and Turkey. The single was released in the United States and the United Kingdom during the summer of 2006, and was featured in the trailer for the movie The Fast and the Furious: Tokyo Drift in the UK.

Their second single, "Higher", was released on July 31, 2006.

Singer Dorien Driessens also performs in the rock band Boston Tea Party, and she is responsible for the backing vocals of Djumbo.

== Discography ==
Singles & EPs

- “Keep On Moving” (2005)
- “Higher” (2006)
- “Won’t You” (feat. NG) (2008)
- “Your Love” (2010)
