= Future Breeze =

German trance music duo

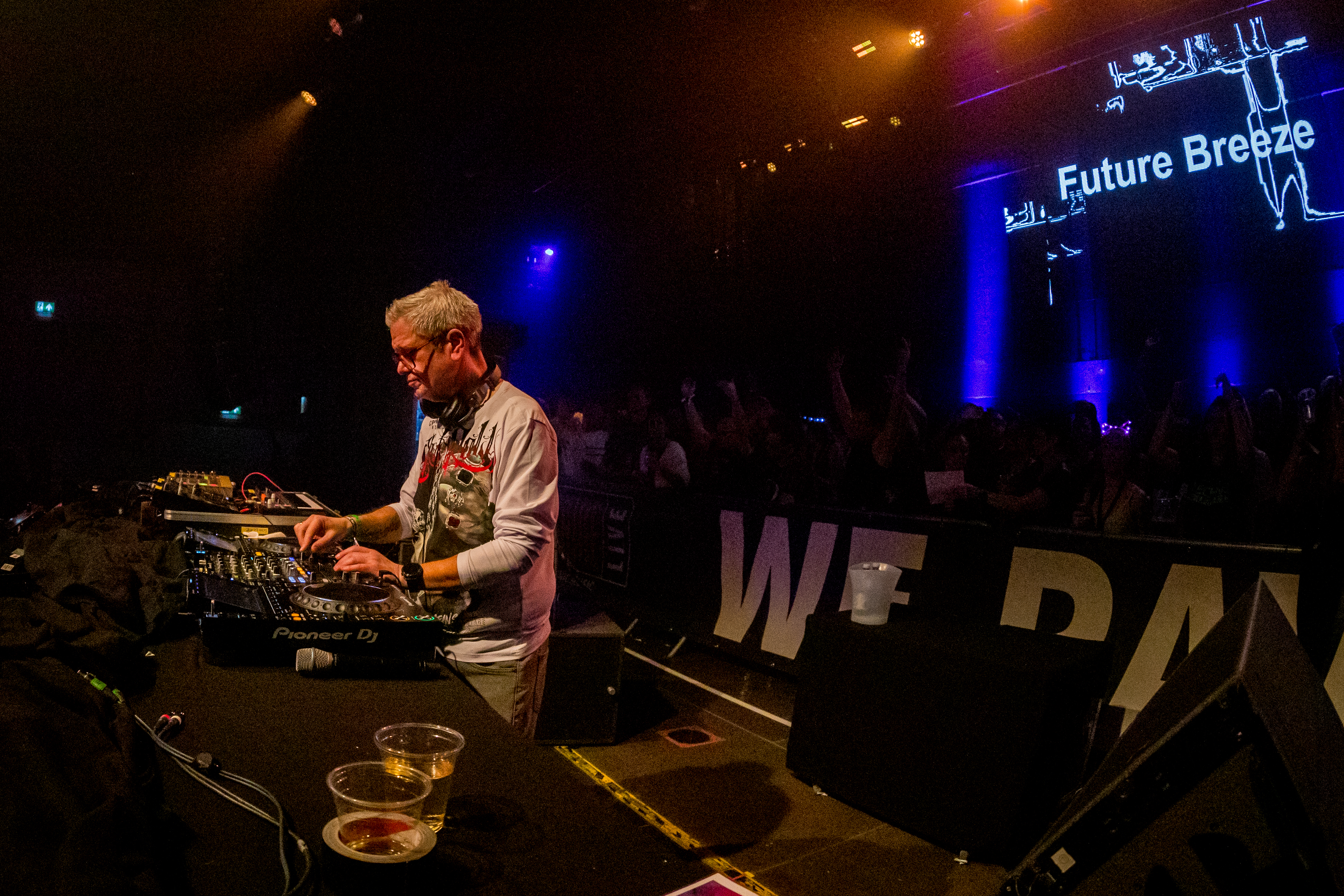
- Future Breeze in 2024

Background information
- Origin: Essen, Germany
- Genres: Trance, Progressive trance, Pizzicato Trance
- Years active: 1995–2009
- Labels: Alphabet City, EMI Electrola, Superstar Recordings
- Members: Markus Boehme, Martin Hensing

Future Breeze is a German trance music duo formed in Essen, Germany, by Markus Boehme and Martin Hensing. They became well known for their progressive trance and pizzicato trance tracks throughout the late 1990s and early 2000s, particularly with the mainstream success of songs such as "Why Don't You Dance With Me" and their widely celebrated remix of Sash!'s "Encore Une Fois".

== History ==
Future Breeze was established in 1995 by producers Markus Boehme and Martin Hensing. Their first major success came with the release of "Why Don't You Dance With Me" in 1996. The track, blending trance with progressive elements, achieved notable chart success across Europe, particularly in Germany, where it reached as high as 14. Shortly thereafter their remix of Sash!'s Encore Une Fois became a massive mainstream hit all across Europe, reaching the top ten in several countries and arguably launching the mainstream success of the Sash! project. Following this success, Future Breeze continued to release a string of singles. While many releases did fairly well commercially and on dance floors, they were never able to replicate their previous successes.

== Discography ==
=== Albums ===
- 1997: Why?
- 2005: Second Life

=== Singles ===
- 1995 – House
- 1995 – Read My Lips
- 1996 – Why Don’t You Dance with Me
- 1997 – Keep the Fire Burnin’
- 1997 – Why
- 1997 – How Much Can You Take
- 1998 – Another Day
- 1999 – Cruel World
- 2000 – Smile
- 2001 – Mind in Motion
- 2001 – Temple of Dreams
- 2002 – Ocean of Eternity
- 2002 – Heaven Above
- 2004 – Push / Second Life
- 2004 – Out of the Blue
- 2009 – Adagio for Strings
- 2009 – Fade to Grey
- 2010 – Why Don’t You Dance with Me 2010
- 2012 – Animal
- 2019 – Loosing You (with Mark van der Zanden)
- 2019 – Hymnotic
