= Ganbareh =

Single by Sash!

from the album S4!Sash!
- Released: 24 June 2002
- Genre: Eurodance; trance
- Length: 3:50
- Label: Virgin
- Songwriter(s): Sascha Lappessen; Ralf Kappmeier; Thomas Alisson
- Producer(s): Sash!; Tokapi

Sash! singles chronology
"Together Again" (2000)	"Ganbareh" (2002)	"Run" (2002)

"Ganbareh" (頑張れ, "go for it" in Japanese) is a song by German production group Sash!, released on June 24, 2002, via Virgin Records as the first single from their fourth studio album S4!Sash!.

== Overview ==
The song was originally written for the official FIFA World Cup 2002 album as South Korea and Japan hosted the event. It did not make it there, but was instead used for the official ice hockey world cup. The single also includes a bonus track, "The Sunset", performed by Georgina Collins.

== Track listing ==
All tracks are written by Ralph Kappmaier, Thomas Allison and Sascha Lappessen

No.	Title	Length
1.	"Ganbareh" (Single Edit)	3:50
2.	"The Sunset" (Single Edit)	3:44
3.	"Ganbareh" (X-Tended Version)	5:56
4.	"Ganbareh" (Remix – Careca)	6:10
5.	"Ganbareh" (Bonus Trailer)	2:56

== Credits ==
- Artwork – Virgin Munich
- Cover photography – Adrian Raba, Hagen Brede Productions GmbH
- Producer – Sash!, Tokapi
- Vocals – Mikio (tracks 1, 3, 4 and 5), Georgina Collins (track 2)
- Writers – Ralf Kappmeier, Sascha Lappessen, Thomas Alisson

== Charts ==
Chart (2002)	Peak position
Australia (ARIA)	43
Denmark (Tracklisten)	7
Germany (GfK)	43
Spain (PROMUSICAE)	3
Switzerland (Schweizer Hitparade)	94
