= Life Changes =

Life Changes may refer to:

== Albums ==
- Life Changes (Sash! album), 2013
- Life Changes (Thomas Rhett album), 2017

== Songs ==
- "Life Changes" (2013), by Sash! from Life Changes
- "Life Changes" (2016), by Good Charlotte from Youth Authority
- "Life Changes" (Thomas Rhett song), from Life Changes
