= Adrian Rodriguez (DJ) =

Argentine DJ & record producer

- Born: Adrian Rodriguez
- Origin: Argentina
- Genres: Trance
- Occupations: Record producer, DJ
- Years active: 1996–present
- Label: Clubland Records (US)
- Website: www.myspace.com/djadrianrodriguez

Adrian Rodriguez, also known by the name Rodriguez, is a trance producer and DJ from Nordrhein-Westfalen, Germany who debuted in 1994, pairing with Sash! to create hits such as "Ecuador" and "Adelante".

== Discography ==
Featured in

List of singles, with selected chart positions and certifications, showing year released and album name
Year	Single	Peak chart positions										Certifications	Sash! album
Year	Single	GER	GER	FIN	FRA	IRE	NLD	NOR	SWE	SWI	UK	Certifications	Sash! album
1997	"Ecuador" (Sash! featuring Rodriguez)	7	—	3	12	4	8	4	4	8	2	FRA: Silver; SWE: Gold; UK: Gold	It's My Life – The Album
2000	"Adelante" (Sash! featuring Peter Faulhammer & Rodriguez)	17	4	—	37	11	49	7	7	18	2	AUS: Gold; SWE: Platinum	Trilenium
2002	"Ecuador Reloaded" (Sash! featuring Rodriguez)	—	—	—	—	—	—	—	—	—	89		10th Anniversary
