= Run (Sash! song) =

Single by Sash! featuring Boy George

from the album S4!Sash!
- Released: 28 October 2002
- Genre: Trance; Eurodance
- Length: 3:56
- Label: Virgin
- Songwriters: Ralf Kappmeier; Sascha Lappessen; Thomas Lüdke; Kevan Frost; George O'Dowd
- Producers: Sash!, Tokapi

Sash! singles chronology
"Ganbareh" (2002)	"Run" (2002)	"I Believe" (2002)

Boy George singles chronology
"When Will You Learn" (1998)	"Run" (2002)	"Somebody to Love Me" (2010)

"Run" is a song by German production group Sash!. The record was released on 28 October 2002 via Virgin Records as the second single from their fourth studio album S4!Sash!. It features vocals by British musician Boy George.

== Track listing ==
All tracks are written by Ralf Kappmeier, Thomas Allison, Sascha Lappessen.

No.	Title	Length
1.	"Run" (original version)	3:56
2.	"Luna Llena" (original version)	3:26

== Charts ==
Chart (2002)	Peak position
Denmark (Tracklisten)	12
Germany (GfK)	48
Hungary (Single Top 40)	5
Switzerland (Schweizer Hitparade)	98
Spain (PROMUSICAE)	9
