= I Believe (Sash! song) =

2002 single by Sash! featuring T.J. Davis

Single by Sash! featuring T.J. Davis

from the album S4!Sash!
- Released: 2002
- Genre: Trance; Eurodance
- Length: 3:47
- Label: Virgin
- Songwriter(s): Sascha Lappessen; Ralf Kappmeier; Thomas Alisson
- Producer(s): Sash!; Tokapi

Sash! singles chronology
"Run" (2002)	"I Believe" (2002)	"Ecuador Reloaded" (2007)

"I Believe" is a song by German production group Sash!. The record was released in 2002 via Virgin Records as the third and final single from their fourth studio album S4!Sash!. It features vocals by British singer TJ Davis.

== Track listing ==
All tracks are written by Ralph Kappmaier, Thomas Allison, Sascha Lappessen

No.	Title	Length
1.	"I Believe" (Radio Edit)	3:47
2.	"I Believe" (Original Extended)	6:23
3.	"I Believe" (Manian Vs. Triffid Remix)	6:43
4.	"Nessun Dorma"	6:01

== Credits ==
- Artwork – Virgin Munich
- Featuring – T.J. Davis
- Producer – Sash!, Tokapi
- Vocals – T.J. Davis (tracks: 1 to 3)
- Writers – Ralf Kappmeier, Sascha Lappessen, Thomas Alisson

== Charts ==
Chart performance for "I Believe"
Chart (2003)	Peak position
Australia (ARIA)	63
Germany (GfK)	67
