= Just Around the Hill =

2000 single by Sash! and Tina Cousins

Single by Sash! featuring Tina Cousins

from the album Trilenium
- Released: 10 April 2000
- Genre: Pop
- Length: 36:54
- Label: X-IT
- Songwriters: Sascha Lappessen; Ralf Kappmeier; Thomas Alisson
- Producers: Sash!; Tokapi

Sash! singles chronology
| "Adelante" (1998) | "Just Around the Hill" (2000) | "With My Own Eyes" (2000) |

Tina Cousins singles chronology
| "Angel" (1999) | "Just Around the Hill" (2000) | "Nothing to Fear" (2000) |

Music video
- "Just Around the Hill" on YouTube

"Just Around the Hill" is a song by German production team Sash!, released on 10 April 2000 as the second single from their third album, Trilenium (2000). It was the second Sash! single to feature British singer Tina Cousins on vocals, after "Mysterious Times" in 1998. The song was written by Sash! members Sascha Lappessen, Ralf Kappmeier and Thomas Alisson, and it was produced by the team with Tokapi.

"Just Around the Hill" peaked at No. 8 on the UK Singles Chart and was also a top-10 hit in the Czech Republic and Romania. The accompanying music video was directed by Finnish director Antti Jokinen and was filmed in Thailand, featuring Lappessen's wife. There are two versions of the video: one for the ballad version and another for the dance version.

== Critical reception ==
Jon O'Brien from AllMusic noted that Tina Cousins "lends her sultry vocals" to the "gorgeous chillout" song. Pop Rescue commented, "...this sees the return of SASH!'s former collaborator, the brilliant Tina Cousins. This song is unlike anything else so far on this album – it's a pop ballad. Tina's vocals are beautiful, and she's surrounded by minimal bleeping and bubbling synths, and some synth strings. She's given loads of space to show off her rich vocals."

== Track listing ==
German version

All tracks are written by Ralph Kappmaier, Thomas Allison, Sascha Lappessen.

| No. | Title | Length |
|---|---|---|
| 1. | "Just Around the Hill" (radio/video edit) | 3:30 |
| 2. | "Just Around the Hill" (unplugged radio edit) | 3:30 |
| 3. | "Just Around the Hill" (dance radio edit) | 3:49 |
| 4. | "Just Around the Hill" (Doug Laurent 12-inch vocal mix) | 8:06 |
| 5. | "Just Around the Hill" (DJ Shah Remix) | 7:29 |
| 6. | "Just Around the Hill" (extended dance mix) | 5:16 |
| 7. | "Just Around the Hill" (extended dance radio mix) | 5:31 |

== Credits ==
- Lyrics and music by R. Kappmeier, S. Lappessen, Thomas Alisson (tracks: T. Alisson)
- Producer – Sash!, Tokapi
- Vocals – Tina Cousins
- Produced at Pink Elephant Studios
- Published by Step By Step
- Additional production: Track 4 – Doug Laurent, Track 5 – DJ Shah & Westböhm for SMP

℗ 2000 X-IT Records GmbH 0108585XIT
© 2000 edel records GmbH

== Charts ==
=== Weekly charts ===
| Chart (2000) | Peak position |
|---|---|
| Australia (ARIA) | 26 |
| Belgium (Ultratop 50 Flanders) | 37 |
| Belgium (Ultratop 50 Wallonia) | 30 |
| Czech Republic (IFPI) | 9 |
| Denmark (IFPI) | 16 |
| Finland (Suomen virallinen lista) | 16 |
| France (SNEP) | 55 |
| Germany (GfK) | 64 |
| Iceland (Íslenski Listinn Topp 40) | 24 |
| Ireland (IRMA) | 30 |
| Netherlands (Dutch Top 40 Tipparade) | 9 |
| Netherlands (Single Top 100) | 60 |
| Romania (Romanian Top 100) | 5 |
| Scotland Singles (OCC) | 4 |
| Sweden (Sverigetopplistan) | 30 |
| Switzerland (Schweizer Hitparade) | 51 |
| UK Singles (OCC) | 8 |

=== Year-end charts ===
| Chart (2000) | Position |
|---|---|
| Romania (Romanian Top 100) | 52 |
| UK Singles (OCC) | 164 |
