= Stunt (band) =

British dance music band

- Origin: United Kingdom
- Genres: Dance
- Years active: 2006-present
- Labels: Absolution; Data Records; Ministry Of Sound; Ultra Records
- Members: Pete Kirtley; Molly Smitten-Downes; Simon Wills; Mark Dowling; Dave Valler
- Website: https://www.facebook.com/officialmolly/

Stunt is a dance music project of British remixers/producers Pete Kirtley, Molly Smitten-Downes, Simon Wills, Mark Dowling and Dave Valler. Stunt is signed to Absolute records with their releases distributed through AATW (All Around the World).

== History ==
David Valler and Molly Smitten-Downes collaborated to write lyrics and a melody (topline) over the Sash! hit "Encore une fois", creating an international club hit, "Raindrops". It was picked up in the United States by Ultra Records and by Ministry of Sound in the United Kingdom in 2006.

A new reworking of "Raindrops" between Stunt and Sash! was released as a download-only track on 6 October 2008 on Hard2Beat records. A week later, "Raindrops (Encore une fois)" was released for general sale on CD and entered the top 10 of the UK Singles Chart on 19 October at No. 9.

A new single entitled "I'll Be There" was released on digital format on 8 June 2009. The song was released on promo several years earlier via Smitten-Downes' previous alias of Amesha. The inlay to the promo of the Stunt version stated that a new album entitled Neon Nights would be released by the group in the future.

Also in 2009, Smitten-Downes teamed with Swedish producer and singer/songwriter Basshunter, for the collaboration "I Will Learn to Love Again", which is featured on his second UK album Bass Generation. In addition to this, a collaboration with Darren Styles ("Shining Star") was released on Clubland Extreme Hardcore 6.

Their next single "Fade Like the Sun" was released in 2010. The song has been remixed by several artists such as Flip & Fill, Frisco and Kenny Hayes.

In March 2020, DJ/remixer Ben Nicky teamed up with Stunt for a new recording of "Raindrops".

== Discography ==
=== Albums ===
List of studio albums, with selected details
Title	Album details
Neon Nights	Released: TBA; Label: TBA; Format: TBA

=== Singles ===
==== As lead artist ====
List of singles as lead artist with selected chart positions
Title	Year	Peak chart positions		
Title	Year	UK	IRL	FIN
"Raindrops"	2006	51	49	8
"I'll Be There"	2009	—	—	—
"Fade Like the Sun"	2010	—	—	—
"—" denotes single that did not chart or was not released.

==== As featured artist ====
List of singles as featured artist with selected chart positions and certifications
Title	Year	Peak chart positions						Certifications
Title	Year	UK	BEL (WA)	BEL (FL)	GER	IRL	NLD	Certifications
"Raindrops (Encore une fois)" (Sash! feat. Stunt)	2008	9	— (Note: "Raindrops (Encore une fois)" did not enter the Ultratop 50, but peaked at number 10 on the Wallonish Ultratip chart.)	6	51	26	49	BPI: Silver
"—" denotes single that did not chart or was not released.

=== As featured artist ===
- 2009 - "I Will Learn to Love Again" - Basshunter ft. Stunt (Hard2Beat)
- 2009 - "Shining Star" - Darren Styles & Chris Unknown ft. Stunt (All Around the World)
- 2010 - "TBC" - Sash! ft. Stunt
- 2010 - "I'm Alive" - Micky Modelle & Mark Breeze ft. Stunt
- 2010 - "Like a Bitch" - Darren Styles ft. Stunt
