= R3hab =

Dutch-Moroccan DJ and record producer

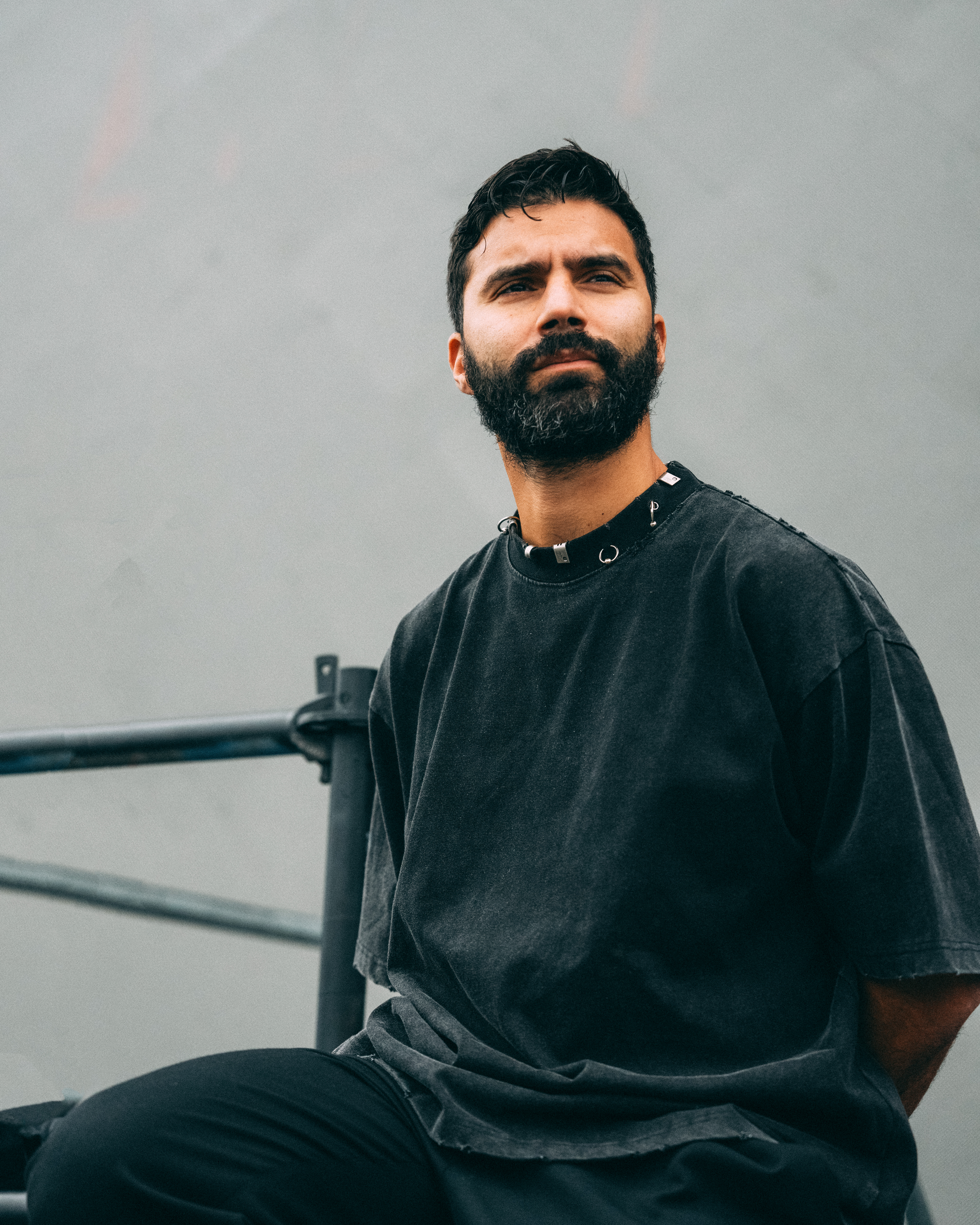
- R3hab in 2024

Background information
- Born: Fadil El Ghoul; 2 April 1986 (age 40); Breda, North Brabant, Netherlands
- Genres: Electro house; big room house; future bounce; future house; future bass; dance-pop; slap house; bass house; Brazilian bass
- Occupations: Disc jockey; record producer; remixer
- Years active: 2007–present
- Labels: Cyb3rpvnk; Spinnin' Records; Smash the House; Liquid State
- Website: r3hab.com

Fadil El Ghoul (Arabic: فضيل الغول; born 2 April 1986), known by his stage name R3hab (stylized in all caps as R3HAB; pronounced "rehab"), is a Dutch-Moroccan DJ and record producer.

Ranked at number 12 on the DJ Mag Top 100 DJs in 2018, R3HAB has produced two full studio albums and has remixed songs for a wide variety of artists, including 5 Seconds of Summer, Katy Perry, Arashi, Everglow, Lady Gaga, Taylor Swift, Rihanna, Rammstein, Steve Aoki, The Chainsmokers, For King & Country, and KSI.

== Career ==
R3hab began his career in late 2007 while producing the track "Mrkrstft" which was remixed by fellow Breda DJ Hardwell. His connection with what was then a small scene of Dutch DJs helped him to grow. After releasing Prutataaa with Afrojack, he signed with Afrojack's label, producing and remixing tracks.

Released independently, his 2017 debut album Trouble has gained over 500 million streams globally to date. R3HAB's second full-length studio album received over 350 million plays, with tracks "Ain't That Why", "Hold On Tight", "The Wave" and "Lullaby" reaching the Billboard Hot Dance/Electronic charts.

In 2019 R3hab remixed ATC's 2000 single "Around The World (La La La)", which became his most streamed song on Spotify with over 634 million streams and features "A Touch of Class." The track topped the Spotify charts in eight countries and landed on the Global Viral Chart.

In 2019, R3hab joined an artist management company called Dancing Dragon Management under Live Nation Electronic Asia for an exclusive deal to spread in China. In the same year, Liquid State, a joint venture between Tencent and Sony Music, said at the All That Matters conference that it had signed R3hab to an Asian distribution deal. As part of the deal, he will be releasing new tracks through Liquid State that focus on the Asian market, while licensing his CYB3RPVNK label's music library of more than 190 tracks. On his current world tour, R3HAB has performed in 116 concerts (as of 26 October 2019) and has featured Cash Cash and Alan Walker.

On 28 April 2023, R3hab released the single "Rock My Body", in collaboration with Romanian singer Inna and German producers Sash!. The single interpolates Sash!'s 1997 hit single "Ecuador".

== Discography ==
- Trouble (2017)
- The Wave (2018)
- Dream Inside a Dream... (2026)
