= Life Is a Beach =

Studio album by Sash!
- Released: 31 August 2012
- Genre: Progressive house, Eurodance
- Length: 56:18
- Label: Tokapi Recordings TR035
- Producer: SASH! & Tokapi

Sash! chronology
The Best of (2008)	Life Is a Beach (2012)	Life Changes (2013)

Singles from Life Is a Beach
- 1. "What Is Life" Released: 2 November 2012; 2. "The Secret" Released: 29 March 2013

Life Is a Beach is the fifth studio album by German DJ Sash!. It was released worldwide on 31 August 2012 by Tokapi Recordings. The record includes two singles "What Is Life" and "The Secret", featuring vocals of Sarah Brightman.

== Track listing ==
No.	Title	Length
1.	"Life Is a Beach"	3:51
2.	"What Is Life"	3:46
3.	"Captivated"	3:06
4.	"Get Ready"	3:45
5.	"Te Quiero Mi Amor" (feat. Natasha Anderson)	4:26
6.	"Save Me Tonight"	2:33
7.	"Schwanensee"	3:50
8.	"Back in My Life" (feat. Natasha Anderson)	3:38
9.	"Tell Me Why" (feat. Annakiya)	3:05
10.	"The Secret - Reloaded" (feat. Sarah Brightman)	3:30
11.	"World Gone Wild"	3:46
12.	"Backstreets of My Mind"	3:54
13.	"Je T´aime"	3:13
14.	"Bailemos al Sol"	3:37
15.	"Ojo Del Tigre" (feat. Max Klaas)	3:09

== Personnel ==
- Sash!
- Natasha Anderson
- Annakiya
- Sarah Brightman
- Max Klaas

== Credits ==
- Produced by SASH! & Tokapi
- Written by Ralf Kappmeier, Thomas Alisson and Sascha Lappessen
- Featuring vocals by Natasha Anderson, Annakiya and Sarah Brightman
- Featuring drums and percussion by Max Klaas
