= It's My Life (Sash! song) =

Single by Sash!

from the album It's My Life – The Album
- Released: 1996
- Recorded: 1995
- Length: 6:10
- Label: X-IT Records X-IT 004
- Songwriters: Sascha Lappessen, Ralf Kappmeier, Thomas Alisson
- Producers: Sash!, Tokapi

Sash! singles chronology
"It's My Life" (1996)	"Encore une fois" (1996)

"It's My Life" is a song by German production group Sash!. The record was released in 1996 via X-IT Records as the debut single from their debut studio album It's My Life – The Album. Sascha Lappessen performed the vocal part for this song, but there was no video recorded for the single.

== Track listing ==
All tracks are written by Ralph Kappmaier, Thomas Allison, Sascha Lappessen.

No.	Title	Length
1.	"It's My Life" (Kicking Life)	6:11
2.	"It's My Life" (Fonky Life)	5:34
3.	"It's My Life" (Fonky Short Life)	3:40
