= It's My Life – The Album =

Debut album by German DJ/production team Sash!

It's My Life

Studio album by Sash!
- Released: June 1997
- Recorded: 1996–97
- Genres: Progressive, Techno
- Labels: Mighty; X-It; Multiply
- Producers: Sash!; Tokapi

Sash! chronology
It's My Life (1997)	Life Goes On (1998)

Singles from It's My Life
- 1. "It's My Life" Released: 23 July 1996; 2. "Encore Une Fois" Released: 1996 / 21 January 1997; 3. "Ecuador" Released: 22 April 1997; 4. "Stay" Released: 26 September 1997

Professional ratings
Review scores
Source	Rating
AllMusic	2.5/5 stars
Music Week	2/5 stars

It's My Life (also known as It's My Life – The Album) is the debut album by German DJ/production team Sash!, released in June 1997 via the Multiply and PolyGram labels. Four singles were released from the album: "It's My Life", "Encore une fois", "Ecuador" and "Stay". Two versions of the album exist: a one-disc version and a later version with a second disc featuring remixes. The album was certified platinum in the UK.

In December 1997, record label Scandinavian Records filed a complaint against IFPI Danmark because they believed the published chart was too heavily weighted towards sales from supermarkets and not from real music stores. This was after Sash! went into the album chart with It's My Life at number 2 having sold 2,000 units but dropped down to number 20 the following week despite having sold 8,000 units.

== Track listing ==
Standard version
No.	Title	Writer(s)	Length
1.	"Mighty Break"	Ralf Kappmeier; Sascha Lappessen; Thomas Alisson	5:56
2.	"Final Pizzi"	Kappmeier; Lappessen; Alisson	5:11
3.	"Cheating Twister"	Kappmeier; Lappessen; Alisson	5:14
4.	"Stay" (featuring La Trec)	Kappmeier; Lappessen; Alisson; Frankie McCoy	5:54
5.	"Sweat" (featuring La Trec)	Kappmeier; Lappessen; Alisson; McCoy	5:53
6.	"Hoopstar" (Sash! & Nonex)	Volker Bertelmann; El Topo; Piid; Kappmeier; Lappessen; Alisson; McCoy	6:52
7.	"It's My Life"	Kappmeier; Lappessen; Alisson	6:12
8.	"Encore une fois"	Kappmeier; Lappessen; Alisson	6:25
9.	"Ecuador" (featuring Rodriguez)	Kappmeier; Lappessen; Alisson	5:51
10.	"It's My Life" (NBG mix)	Kappmeier; Lappessen; Alisson	5:50
11.	"Encore une fois" (Future Breeze mix)	Kappmeier; Lappessen; Alisson	6:27
12.	"Ecuador" (featuring Rodriguez) (Bruce Wayne mix)	Kappmeier; Lappessen; Alisson	5:48

Australian edition
No.	Title	Length
1.	"It's My Life"	6:12
2.	"Encore une fois" (featuring Sabine Ohmes)	6:25
3.	"Ecuador" (featuring Rodriguez)	5:51
4.	"Mighty Break"	5:58
5.	"Final Pizzi"	5:11
6.	"Cheating Twister"	5:14
7.	"Stay" (featuring La Trec)	5:54
8.	"Sweat" (featuring La Trec)	5:53
9.	"Hoopstar" (featuring Nonex)	6:52
10.	"It's My Life" (NBG remix)	5:50
11.	"Encore une fois" (Future Breeze mix)	6:27
12.	"Ecuador" (Bruce Wayne mix)	5:48

Italian edition
No.	Title	Length
1.	"It's My Life"	6:16
2.	"Encore une fois" (featuring Sabine Ohmes)	6:30
3.	"Ecuador" (featuring Rodriguez)	5:55
4.	"Mighty Break"	5:59
5.	"Final Pizzi"	5:15
6.	"Cheating Twister"	5:19
7.	"Stay" (featuring La Trec)	6:00
8.	"Sweat" (featuring La Trec)	5:58
9.	"Hoopstar" (featuring Nonex)	6:55
10.	"It's My Life" (NBG remix)	5:53
11.	"Encore une fois" (Future Breeze mix)	6:29
12.	"Ecuador" (Klubbheads mix)	6:32

== Charts ==
Chart positions for It's My Life
Chart (1997)	Peak position
Australian Albums (ARIA)	82
Belgian Albums (Ultratop Flanders)	17
Belgian Albums (Ultratop Wallonia)	37
Dutch Albums (Album Top 100)	32
German Albums (Offizielle Top 100)	38
Hungarian Albums (MAHASZ)	18
New Zealand Albums (RMNZ)	11
Norwegian Albums (VG-lista)	19
Swedish Albums (Sverigetopplistan)	12
Swiss Albums (Schweizer Hitparade)	37
UK Albums (Official Charts)	6

== Certifications ==
Certifications for It's My Life
Region	Certification	Certified units/sales
Belgium (BRMA)	Gold	25,000^{*}
United Kingdom (BPI)	Platinum	300,000^{^}
^{*} Sales figures based on certification alone.^{^} Shipments figures based on certification alone.
