= Hitlisten =

Top 40 music charts of Denmark

Hitlisten (lit. 'the hit list'), formerly known as Tracklisten, is a Danish top 40 record chart that is updated every Wednesday at 00:01 on the website hitlisten.nu. The weekly Danish singles chart combines the 40 best-selling tracks from streaming and legal music downloads. The Danish albums chart combines downloads, streaming and also sales of CDs. There is a separate vinyl chart. The data are collected by M&I Service, who also compile the chart on behalf of IFPI Danmark, the local branch of the International Federation of the Phonographic Industry.

== Timeline history ==
=== 1965–1979 ===
- This chart began in April 1965 as a monthly Top 20 chart compiled by the Danish branch of the International Federation of the Phonographic Industry (IFPI). It was published in several major Danish newspapers. Prior to that several Danish charts were compiled by competing newspapers.
- From April 1969 it went weekly after Danmarks Radio stopped publishing their weekly Top 20 chart. However, the chart was based on sales from wholesalers to retailers and not on sales by retailers.
- From May 1973 to December 1978 singles and albums were presented on the same chart due to a request from Danmarks Radio for variety in their chart show. During this period only a few singles reached the top and Danmarks Radio stopped broadcasting the IFPI chart in early 1977 because the chart was based on sales to distributors and not over-the-counter sales. The album and singles charts were finally split again in January 1979.
- 5 January 1979 – first official singles chart in Denmark. IFPI Danmark are behind it and it is based on shipments from distributors to retailers. Tabloid newspaper B.T. publish the chart every Friday. Although a Top 30 is compiled by IFPI, B.T. only publish the Top 10.

=== 1981–2002 ===
- 12 June 1981 – B.T. start publishing the Top 15 after months of strike.
- April 1990 – B.T. who are getting increasingly dissatisfied with the charts (singles and albums alike) cut the singles chart to a Top 10 in the paper.
- 5 June 1992 – B.T. scrap IFPI's chart because it excluded non-IFPI members, and start producing their own albums Top 20 chart based on actual sales. However, the IFPI chart is still compiled as a Top 30 and the Top 10 of it is published in Music & Media. The Top 30 is used by Music & Media to compile the European Hot 100 Singles chart.
- 1 January 1993 – IFPI and AC/Nielsen Marketing Research begin running tests on new official charts based on actual sales in 80 stores in Denmark. Music & Media also announced that IFPI Denmark was moving towards launching a national airplay chart as well through collaboration with AC Nielsen.
- 5 March 1993 – The new official charts are launched. Music & Media write about this on 16 January 1993, but do not implement the charts until 10 July 1993. The chart is compiled as a Top 50 by IFPI/Nielsen but only the Top 20 is published in Denmark and Music & Media only publish the Top 10. However, the Top 50 is used by Music & Media to compile the European Hot 100 Singles chart.
- From week 15 in 1996 the Top 20 that is published in Denmark and the Top 20 songs in the Top 50 are not the same songs. This is because the Top 20, which was the officially published chart while the Top 50 is kept internally and given to Music & Media, was based on two week sales to keep the chart stable in a small market like Denmark.
- In December 1997, record label Scandinavian Records filed a complaint against IFPI because they believed the published chart was too heavily weighted towards sales from supermarkets and not from real music stores. This was after their dance act, Sash!, went into the album chart with It's My Life at number 2 having sold 2,000 units but dropped down to number 20 the following week despite having sold 8,000 units.
- In 2000, the Top 20 that is published and the Top 20 of the Top 50 used by Music & Media align again.
- In December 2000, IFPI announced that they wanted to re-launch the Danish charts to be universally used by all media outlets because many retailers, TV and radio stations were compiling their own charts.
- In November 2002, Music & Media reported that roughly half of the Top 40 album chart was occupied by Danish acts.

=== 2007–present ===
- 1 November 2007 – After years of deteriorating sales of CD singles in Denmark, downloads are finally implemented in the official charts meaning Tracklisten Top 40 becomes the new official chart. It has since been backtracked to become the official chart from 12 January 2007. The singles Top 20 sales chart is dropped. Trine Dyrholm charts for 135 weeks with the EP "Mr. Nice Guy" including 62 weeks at number one.
- [Some time in] 2011 – a streaming Top 20 chart is launched.
- 14 November 2014 – download figures have gone down and streaming has completely taken over. From this date streaming is implemented into the official singles chart. No change since.

== Current charts ==
The current Hitlisten charts are:

- Album Top-40 - the best selling CDs, downloads and most streamed albums and EPs. Streams are converted to album units and added together with sales of CDs and downloads.
- Track Top-40 - the most streamed and downloaded tracks. Streams are converted to track units and added together with download sales.
- Compilation Top-10 - the best selling compilation albums on CDs, downloads and streams.
- Airplay Top-20 - the most played songs on Danish radio stations.
- Vinyl Top-40 - the best selling vinyl albums.
- Annual lists - year-end lists with the same rules as the weekly charts listed above but covering the period from 1 January to 31 December.

== See also ==
- List of number-one hits (Denmark)
