= Change Your Life =

Change Your Life may refer to:

- "Change Your Life" (Alexia song), 1999
- "Change Your Life" (Anna Tsuchiya song), 2006
- "Change Your Life" (Far East Movement song), 2012
- "Change Your Life" (Iggy Azalea song), 2013
- "Change Your Life" (Kehlani song), 2020
- "Change Your Life" (Little Mix song), 2013
- Change Your Life!, 2010 mockumentary film directed by Adam Christing
