= Raindrops (Stunt song) =

Stunt song

"Raindrops" is a dance music song released in 2006 by the British production team Stunt. Produced in Canada by Dave Valler and Gary Johnson, it reached number 8 in Finland. At least six different mixes have been released. Lyrically, "Raindrops" compares the feeling of "raindrops on my skin" to love.

An early report by the Guildford Borough Council describes Smitten-Downes' involvement in the piece:

Molly Smitten-Downes, a student at Guildford's Academy of Contemporary Music, recorded a song called "Raindrops" which had already received airtime on commercial radio and BBC One in November, two months before going on general release. In co-operation with a former student, Dave Valler, she also wrote the lyrics and melody to a backing track owned by Jiant Productions; the song was to be released through Ministry of Sound, with whom Molly and Dave signed a publishing deal which, it was hoped, might lead to a career of stardom.

A new reworking of "Raindrops" between Stunt and German group Sash! was released in 2008 titled "Raindrops (Encore une fois)" which was a top 10 hit in the UK and Belgium (Flanders).

== Raindrops (Encore une fois) ==
"Raindrops (Encore une fois)"

Single by Sash! featuring Stunt

from the album The Best Of
- Released: 20 October 2008
- Genre: Electropop
- Length: 2:56
- Label: Hard2Beat
- Songwriters: Ralf Kappmeier; Sascha Lappessen; Thomas Lüdke; Molly Smitten-Downes; Dave Valler
- Producer: Sash!

Sash! singles chronology
"Ecuador Reloaded" (2007)	"Raindrops (Encore une fois)" (2008)	"All Is Love" (2009)

Stunt singles chronology
"Raindrops" (2006)	"Raindrops (Encore une fois)" (2008)	"I'll Be There" (2009)

"Raindrops (Encore une fois)" is a 2008 single by Sash! and Stunt. It appears on the Sash! album The Best Of. The remix that was most popular is the Kindervater remix.

=== Background ===
Professional ratings
Review scores
Source	Rating
Digital Spy	3/5 stars

"Raindrops (Encore une fois)" is a mashup of Sash!'s hit single "Encore une fois" and Stunt's single "Raindrops". The mashup was provided by German dance project Kindervater, and the song was released as a song by Sash! and Stunt as they both were attracted by the mashup and also both featured in the video. The single did not prove to be as popular as "Encore une fois", but it was more successful than "Raindrops".

Alex Fletcher from Digital Spy said that "Raindrops (Encore une fois)" is sadly toned down and that the synths sound like they were taken from Basshunter.

=== Music video ===
The music video is set in a club with people dancing whilst the singer sings in the middle of the dance floor. It shows clips of a couple running away and later kissing passionately. The video, which uses the "Kindervater UK Remix" was uploaded onto YouTube on 5 September 2008, when it was uploaded onto Hard2Beat's official channel. The main video has received more than 11 million views as of March 2016. In the video, Sash! is playing and can be seen in the background; there are also shots of Stunt's singer, Molly Smitten-Downes singing in the club when it is empty and others of her sat on a bench. When the words "encore une fois" are first heard when the camera cuts to a shot of a woman's cleavage; this scene was censored by major music television stations.

=== Chart performance ===
In the UK, the song debuted at its peak position of No. 9, where it remained for two weeks. In Germany, the single debuted at 51. In Ireland, the single debuted at 32 before rising to its peak position 26. Two weeks later it retained the same position.

=== Track listing ===
1. Original Mix – Radio Edit (3:30)
2. Original Mix – UK Radio Edit (2:54)
3. Original Mix – Extended (5:23)
4. Kindervater UK Edit (2:56)
5. Kindervater Radio Edit (3:18)
6. Kindervater Extended Mix (5:06)
7. Kindervater UK Remix (5:17)
8. Fonzerelli Radio Edit (3:02)
9. Fonzerelli Remix (7:18)
10. DJ Demand Club Mix (5:53)
11. DJ Demand Hardcore Mix (6:42)
12. Thomas Alisson Remix (5:31)
13. Bodo Tuner Remix (5:41)
14. Sascha versus Picco Remix (4:32)
15. Jamón Inglés Remix (4:18)
16. Mark Ves Remix (6:50)
17. Candlelight Remix (3:18)

=== Charts ===
==== Weekly charts ====
Chart (2008–2012)	Peak position
Belgium (Ultratop 50 Flanders)	6
Belgium (Ultratip Bubbling Under Wallonia)	10
European Hot 100 Singles (Billboard)	30
Germany (GfK)	51
Ireland (IRMA)	26
Netherlands (Single Top 100)	49
UK Singles (Official Charts)	9

==== Year-end charts ====
Chart (2008)	Position
UK Singles (Official Charts Company)	100
Chart (2009)	Position
Belgium (Ultratop Flanders)	61

=== Certifications ===
Region	Certification	Certified units/sales
United Kingdom (BPI)	Gold	400,000^{^}
^{^} Shipments figures based on certification alone.
