= Life Changes (Sash! album) =

Studio album by Sash!
- Released: 8 November 2013
- Genre: Progressive house, Eurodance
- Length: 54:00
- Label: Tokapi Recordings TR 047
- Producer: SASH! & Tokapi

Sash! chronology
| Life Is a Beach (2012) | Life Changes (2013) |

Singles from Life Changes
- 1. "Summer's Gone" Released: 18 October 2013; 2. "Can't Change You" Released: 7 March 2014

Life Changes is the sixth studio album by German DJ Sash!. It was released worldwide on 8 November 2013 by Tokapi Recordings. The record includes collaborations with Jessy De Smet and with Tony T. The album also released two singles, "Summer's Gone" in October 2013 and "Can't Change You" in March 2014.

== Track listing ==
| No. | Title | Length |
|---|---|---|
| 1. | "Can't Change You" (Interlude) | 0:42 |
| 2. | "Can't Change You" (featuring Plexiphones) | 4:04 |
| 3. | "Easier" (featuring Peter Maria) | 3:11 |
| 4. | "All Is Love" (Radio Edit - featuring Jessy De Smet) | 3:04 |
| 5. | "Back in Time" (featuring Béatrice Thomas) | 4:39 |
| 6. | "We Like to Party" | 4:50 |
| 7. | "No Love" (featuring Jessy De Smet) | 3:30 |
| 8. | "Electra Zumba" (featuring Bo) | 3:32 |
| 9. | "Otavalo" (featuring Leo Rojas) | 4:38 |
| 10. | "Summer's Gone" (Interlude) | 1:01 |
| 11. | "Summer's Gone" (featuring Tony T.) | 3:34 |
| 12. | "Bring the Heat" | 4:15 |
| 13. | "Sunrise" | 4:41 |
| 14. | "Life Changes" | 8:14 |

== Personnel ==
- Sash! – producer
- Tokapi – producer
- Ralf Kappmeier – songwriter
- Thomas Alisson – songwriter
- Sascha Lappessen – songwriter
- Beatrice Thomas – vocalist
- Bo – vocalist
- Jessy – vocalist
- Leo Rojas – vocalist
- Peter Maria – vocalist
- Plexiphones – vocalist
- Tony T. – vocalist
