= La Primavera (song) =

1998 single by Sash!

Single by Sash!

from the album Life Goes On
- Released: 16 March 1998
- Length: 3:09
- Label: X-It; Mighty; Club Tools
- Songwriters: Ralf Kappmeier; Sascha Lappessen; Thomas Lüdke
- Producers: Sash!; Tokapi

Sash! singles chronology
"Stay" (1997)	"La Primavera" (1998)	"Mysterious Times" (1998)

Music video
- "La Primavera" on YouTube

"La Primavera" is a song by the German DJ/production team Sash! featuring Patrizia Salvatore. It was released on 16 March 1998 via various labels as the lead single from their second album, Life Goes On (1998). The song is written by team members Ralf Kappmeier, Sascha Lappessen and Thomas Lüdke. It was a top-five hit in at least six countries, including Ireland, the United Kingdom, and several Nordic countries. The accompanying music video was directed by Oliver Sommer and filmed in Hawaii.

== Chart performance ==
"La Primavera" reached number two in Denmark, Finland, Norway and Scotland. It entered the top 10 in Belgium, Hungary, Iceland, Ireland, Italy and the United Kingdom, as well as on the Eurochart Hot 100, where it peaked at number four. In the UK, it peaked at number three during its first week on the UK Singles Chart, on 29 March 1998, spending two weeks at that position. It was a additionally a top-20 hit in France, Germany, the Netherlands and Switzerland. Outside Europe, "La Primavera" reached number 36 in Australia and number 29 in New Zealand. It earned a gold record in Belgium and Sweden, with sales of 25,000 and 15,000, respectively. In the UK, it earned a silver record, after 200,000 units were sold.

== Critical reception ==
Stephen Jones from Music Week wrote, "The epic-sounding track with its huge breakdown and Italian vocals contains one of the catchiest and most anthemic piano lines for some time and is a sure hit." James Hyman from the Record Mirror Dance Update gave it a score of four out of five, complimenting it as "an uplifting, commercial tune with Spanish-tinged female vocals from Victoria Senior, not dissimilar to 'Ecuador'."

== Music video ==
The music video for "La Primavera" was directed by Oliver Sommer and filmed in Hawaii, the US. It was produced by AVA Studios GmbH and edited by Andi Mährlein. Sommer had previously directed the videos for Sash!'s hit-singles "Encore une fois", "Stay" and "Ecuador".

== Track listings ==
- German maxi-CD single
1. "La Primavera" (original radio/video edit) – 3:09
2. "La Primavera" (U.K. radio edit) – 3:35
3. "La Primavera" (original 12-inch) – 5:42
4. "La Primavera" (DJ Jam & De Leon remix) – 6:03
5. "La Primavera" (Blank & Jones club mix) – 8:18
6. "La Primavera" (Ric Moraine remix) – 6:11
7. "La Primavera" (Indi-Cut-Tiv) – 2:30
- European CD single
1. "La Primavera" (original radio edit) – 3:09
2. "La Primavera" (Ric Moraine edit) – 3:14
- UK cassette single
1. "La Primavera" (radio edit) – 3:35
2. "La Primavera" (Magic Alec's 'Break for Love' mix) – 7:22
- UK CD1
1. "La Primavera" (radio edit) – 3:35
2. "La Primavera" (DJ JamX & De Leon remix) – 6:03
3. "La Primavera" (Magic Alec's 'As the Wind Blows' mix) – 6:47
4. "La Primavera" (Ric Moraine mix) – 6:11
5. "La Primavera" (Blank & Jones club mix) – 8:19
- UK CD2
1. "La Primavera" (radio edit) – 3:35
2. "La Primavera" (original 12-inch) – 5:42
3. "La Primavera" (Magic Alec's 'Break for Love' mix) – 7:22
4. "The Megamix" (radio edit) – 3:39

== Credits ==
- Producer – Sash!, Tokapi
- Vocals [Uncredited] – Patrizia Salvatore
- Written-By – Ralf Kappmeier, Sascha Lappessen, Thomas Alisson

== Charts ==
=== Weekly charts ===
Weekly chart performance for "La Primavera"
Chart (1998)	Peak position
Australia (ARIA)	36
Austria (Ö3 Austria Top 40)	24
Belgium (Ultratop 50 Flanders)	6
Belgium (Ultratop 50 Wallonia)	11
Denmark (IFPI)	2
Europe (Eurochart Hot 100)	4
Finland (Suomen virallinen lista)	2
France (SNEP)	15
Germany (GfK)	13
Hungary (Mahasz)	8
Iceland (Íslenski Listinn Topp 40)	5
Ireland (IRMA)	5
Italy (Musica e dischi)	8
Netherlands (Dutch Top 40)	13
Netherlands (Single Top 100)	22
New Zealand (Recorded Music NZ)	29
Norway (VG-lista)	2
Scotland Singles (Official Charts)	2
Sweden (Sverigetopplistan)	10
Switzerland (Schweizer Hitparade)	15
UK Singles (Official Charts)	3

=== Year-end charts ===
Year-end chart performance for "La Primavera"
Chart (1998)	Position
Belgium (Ultratop 50 Flanders)	66
Belgium (Ultratop 50 Wallonia)	65
Europe (Eurochart Hot 100)	41
Europe Border Breakers (Music & Media)	16
Netherlands (Dutch Top 40)	119
Sweden (Hitlistan)	80
UK Singles (OCC)	52

== Certifications ==
Certifications and sales for "La Primavera"
Region	Certification	Certified units/sales
Belgium (BRMA)	Gold	25,000^{*}
Sweden (GLF)	Gold	15,000^{^}
United Kingdom (BPI)	Silver	200,000^{^}
^{*} Sales figures based on certification alone.^{^} Shipments figures based on certification alone.
