= S4!Sash! =

Studio album by Sash!
- Released: 11 November 2002; 21 July 2003 (AUS)
- Label: Virgin Records 7243 812864 2 5
- Producer: Sash!, Tokapi

Sash! chronology
Encore Une Fois – The Greatest Hits (2000)	S4!Sash! (2002)	10th Anniversary (2007)

Singles from S4Sash!
- 1. "Ganbareh" Released: 24 June 2002; 2. "Run" Released: 28 October 2002; 3. "I Believe" Released: 2003

S4!Sash! is the fourth studio album by the German producer team Sash!. The album was a two-disc set, released in 2002. Three singles were also released from the record. The most successful single was "Ganbareh!", which reached No.43 in the German and Australian charts. "Ganbareh" featured vocalist Mikio and was released on June 24, 2002.

== Track listing ==
1. "Overture" (featuring T.J. Davis)
2. "Ganbareh" (featuring Mikio)
3. "I Believe" (featuring T.J. Davis)
4. "The Sunset" (featuring Georgina Collins)
5. "The Secret" (featuring Sarah Brightman)
6. "Run" (featuring Boy George)
7. "Rainforest"
8. "Nessun Dorma"
9. "Luna Llena" (featuring La Isla)
10. "Habibi" (featuring DJ Sammy Sam)
11. "Peace of Mind" (featuring Kirstin)
12. "Baila Loca"
13. "Stop Pushin'" (featuring Marvin Broadie)
14. "S4! Sash!"
15. "The Walk"
16. "Don't Be So Rude"

== Credits ==
- Artwork – Virgin Munich
- Photography by Adrian Bela Raba
- Produced by Sash!, Tokapi
- Written by Ralf Kappmeier (tracks: 1 to 5, 7, 8, 10 to 16), Sascha Lappessen (tracks: 1 to 5, 7, 8, 10 to 16), Thomas Alisson (tracks: 1 to 5, 7, 8, 10 to 16)
