= With My Own Eyes =

2000 single by Sash!

Single by Sash!

from the album Trilenium
- Released: 4 September 2000
- Length: 3:40
- Label: X-IT
- Songwriters: Sascha Lappessen; Ralf Kappmeier; Thomas Alisson
- Producers: Sash!; Tokapi

Sash! singles chronology
"Just Around the Hill" (2000)	"With My Own Eyes" (2000)	"Together Again" (2000)

Music video
- "With My Own Eyes" on YouTube

"With My Own Eyes" is a song by German production group Sash!. It was released on 4 September 2000 as the third single from their third album Trilenium. The song's vocals are performed by Finnish singer Inka Auhagen. The song was a hit in several European countries, reaching number 10 on the UK Singles Chart. It was Sash!'s last top-10 single on that chart until 2008.

== Track listing ==
All tracks are written by Ralph Kappmaier, Thomas Allison, Sascha Lappessen.

German maxi-CD single
No.	Title	Length
1.	"With My Own Eyes" (single edit)	3:40
2.	"With My Own Eyes" (album version)	4:03
3.	"With My Own Eyes" (vocal 12-inch)	6:33
4.	"Rock the Block" (maxi version) (vocals by Michael "Ameer" Williams, Sascha Lappessen)	5:00
Total length:		19:13

== Credits ==
- Producer – Sash!, Tokapi
- Vocals – Inka (tracks 1 to 3)
- Writers – R. Kappmeier, S. Lappessen, T. Alisson
- Produced at Pink Elephant Studios
- Published by Step By Step

== Charts ==
=== Weekly charts ===
Chart (2000)	Peak position
Australia (ARIA)	39
Europe (Eurochart Hot 100)	41
Germany (GfK)	46
Ireland (IRMA)	28
Romania (Romanian Top 100)	5
Scotland Singles (OCC)	3
Sweden (Sverigetopplistan)	51
Switzerland (Schweizer Hitparade)	82
UK Singles (OCC)	10

=== Year-end charts ===
Chart (2000)	Position
Romania (Romanian Top 100)	49
