= Life Goes On (Sash! album) =

Studio album by Sash!
- Released: 17 August 1998
- Recorded: 1997–1998
- Label: Mighty 557 738-2

Sash! chronology
It's My Life - The Album (1997)	Life Goes On (1998)	Trilenium (2000)

Singles from Life Goes On
- 1. "La Primavera" Released: April 10, 1998; 2. "Mysterious Times" Released: August 1, 1998; 3. "Move Mania" Released: October 21, 1998; 4. "Colour the World" Released: November 20, 1998

Professional ratings
Review scores
Source	Rating
Allmusic	2/5 stars

Life Goes On is the second album by the German DJ Sash! released on 17 August 1998 via Mighty label. It contains the hit singles "La Primavera" and "Mysterious Times". Overall, the record includes four singles: "La Primavera", "Mysterious Times", "Move Mania", and "Colour the World". The album was certified gold in the UK.

== Track listing ==
UK Edition

No.	Title	Writer(s)	Length
1.	"La Primavera"	Ralf Kappmeier; Sascha Lappessen; Thomas Alisson	3:35
2.	"Mysterious Times" (featuring Tina Cousins)	Kappmeier; Lappessen; Alisson	3:39
3.	"Move Mania" (featuring Shannon)	Kappmeier; Lappessen; Alisson	3:49
4.	"Colour the World" (featuring Dr. Alban)	Kappmeier; Lappessen; Alisson; Dr. Alban	3:35
5.	"The Trip 1:03" (featuring Inka)	Kappmeier; Lappessen; Alisson	3:37
6.	"Non Existent Nothing" (featuring Nonex)	Volker Bertelmann; El Topo; Piid; Kappmeier; Lappessen; Alisson	6:30
7.	"Intercontinental Invaders"	Kappmeier; Lappessen; Alisson	4:47
8.	"It's My Life (Part II)"	Kappmeier; Lappessen; Alisson	4:05
9.	"Life Goes On"	Kappmeier; Lappessen; Alisson	3:55
10.	"Little River"	Kappmeier; Lappessen; Alisson	5:13
11.	"Bocaraton"	Kappmeier; Lappessen; Alisson	5:05
12.	"Oliver Momm's Sash! Hit Mix"	Kappmeier; Lappessen; Alisson	3:39

== Charts ==
Chart positions for Life Goes On
Chart (1998)	Peak position
Australian Albums (ARIA)	35
Belgian Albums (Ultratop Flanders)	8
Belgian Albums (Ultratop Wallonia)	41
Finnish Albums (Suomen virallinen lista)	8
Dutch Albums (Album Top 100)	24
German Albums (Offizielle Top 100)	31
Hungarian Albums (MAHASZ)	27
New Zealand Albums (RMNZ)	12
Norwegian Albums (VG-lista)	5
Swedish Albums (Sverigetopplistan)	11
Swiss Albums (Schweizer Hitparade)	37
UK Albums (Official Charts)	5

== Certifications ==
Certifications for Life Goes On
Region	Certification	Certified units/sales
United Kingdom (BPI)	Gold	100,000^{^}
^{^} Shipments figures based on certification alone.
