= Colour the World =

1999 single by Sash!

Single by Sash! featuring Dr. Alban

from the album Life Goes On
- Released: 8 March 1999
- Length: 3:35
- Label: X-It; Mighty; Club Tools
- Songwriters: Ralf Kappmeier; Sascha Lappessen; Thomas Lüdke; Alban Nwapa
- Producers: Sash!; Tokapi

Sash! singles chronology
"Ma Baker" (1998)	"Colour the World" (1999)	"Adelante" (1999)

Music video
- "Colour the World" on YouTube

Dr. Alban singles chronology
"Feel the Rhythm" (1998)	"Colour the World" (1999)	"It's My Life (Don't Worry)" (2014)

"Colour the World" is a song by German production group Sash! featuring Nigerian-Swedish recording artist and producer Dr. Alban. It was released in March 1999 as the fourth and final single from the group's second studio album, Life Goes On (1998). It was successful in several European countries, including Scotland, where it entered the top 10.

== Critical reception ==
A reviewer from Birmingham Evening Mail commented, "Sash has now entered his tribal, luv'ed up phase. Not as good as previous singles but annoyingly catchy."

== Track listing ==
All lyrics are written by Dr. Alban, Ralf Kappmeier, Sascha Lappessen, Thomas Alisson; all music is composed by Ralph Kappmaier, Thomas Allison, Sascha Lappessen.

No.	Title	Length
1.	"Colour the World" (Single)	3:35
2.	"Colour the World" (Extended Mix)	6:00
3.	"Colour the World" (Dario G. Remix)	4:02
4.	"Colour the World" (ATB Remix)	5:51
5.	"Colour the World" (DJ Delicious Remix)	6:52
6.	"Colour the World" (Dale Cooper & Vincent Price Remix)	6:19
Total length:		32:39

== Personnel ==
- Design – Michael Kowalkowski
- Lyrics – Dr. Alban, Ralf Kappmeier, Sascha Lappessen, Thomas Alisson
- Mastering – J. Quincy Kramer
- Music – Ralf Kappmeier, Sascha Lappessen, Thomas Alisson
- Producer – Sash!, Tokapi
- Vocals – Dr. Alban

== Charts ==
=== Weekly charts ===
Weekly chart performance for "Colour the World"
Chart (1999)	Peak position
Europe (Eurochart Hot 100)	43
Finland (Suomen virallinen lista)	14
France (SNEP)	73
Germany (GfK)	39
Netherlands (Dutch Top 40 Tipparade)	7
Netherlands (Single Top 100)	69
Scottish Singles Sales (Official Charts)	10
Sweden (Sverigetopplistan)	54
Switzerland (Schweizer Hitparade)	39
UK Singles (Official Charts)	15

=== Year-end charts ===
Year-end chart rankings for "Colour the World"
Chart (1999)	Position
Europe Border Breakers (Music & Media)	44
Romania (Romanian Top 100)	24

== Lazy Monkeys version ==
"Colour the World"

Single by Lazy Monkeys
- Released: 11 August 2009
- Label: YAWA Recordings GmbH
- Songwriters: Ralf Kappmeier; Sascha Lappessen; Thomas Lüdke; Alban Nwapa

In 2009, the group Lazy Monkeys released a cover version of the song.

=== Track listing ===
All lyrics are written by Dr. Alban, Ralf Kappmeier, Sascha Lappessen, Thomas "Alisson" Lüdke; all music is composed by Ralph Kappmaier, Thomas Allison, Sascha Lappessen.

No.	Title	Length
1.	"Colour the World" (Sample Rippers Remix)	4:59
2.	"Colour the World" (Phunk Foundation Remix Edit)	3:40
3.	"Colour the World" (Phunk Foundation Remix)	6:03
4.	"Colour the World" (Sample Rippers Radio Edit)	3:10
5.	"Colour the World" (De-Grees Radio Edit)	3:09
6.	"Colour the World" (De-Grees Remix)	4:43
Total length:		25:47

== Other versions ==
- In 1998, a Christmas version of the song saw the light of day, but was officially released on Sash!'s YouTube page in 2016.
- In 2020, a rework of the Christmas version was released.
