= Adelante (Sash! song) =

1999 single by Sash!

Single by Sash!

from the album Trilenium
- Language: Spanish
- English title: "Forward"
- Released: 6 December 1999
- Length: 3:34
- Label: X-IT
- Songwriters: Ralf Kappmeier; Sascha Lappessen; Thomas Alisson; Adrian Rodriguez; Peter Faulhammer
- Producers: Sash!; Topkapi; Stefan Bossems; Claus Terhoeven

Sash! singles chronology
"Colour the World" (1999)	"Adelante" (1999)	"Just Around the Hill" (2000)

Rodriguez singles chronology
"Ecuador" (1997)	"Adelante" (1999)	"Ecuador Reloaded" (2002)

Music video
- "Adelante" on YouTube

"Adelante" (English: "Forward") is a song by German electronic production duo Sash!. Taken from Trilenium (2000), the duo's third studio album, "Adelante" became a chart hit, reaching number one in Romania and Scotland, number two on the UK Singles Chart, and the top 10 in Australia, Flanders, Denmark, Finland, Norway, and Sweden. In Australia, the song was certified gold for shipments of over 35,000 copies, and in Sweden, it went platinum for shipments exceeding 30,000 units.

== Track listings ==
- German and European CD single
1. "Adelante" (original 7-inch) – 3:45
2. "Adelante" (original 12-inch) – 6:50
- European maxi-CD single
1. "Adelante" (original 7-inch) – 3:45
2. "Adelante" (original 12-inch) – 6:50
3. "Adelante" (Cosmic Gate remix) – 7:07
4. "Adelante" (DuMonde remix) – 7:25
5. "Adelante" (Avancada remix) – 7:31
6. "Adelante" (original 7-inch without intro) – 3:35
- UK CD single
1. "Adelante" (radio edit) – 3:32
2. "Adelante" (Ruff Driverz remix) – 7:02
3. "Adelante" (DuMonde remix) – 7:20
- UK 12-inch single

A1. "Adelante" (original 12-inch) – 6:45
B1. "Adelante" (Ruff Driverz remix) – 7:02
B2. "Adelante" (DuMonde remix) – 6:11

- UK cassette single
1. "Adelante" (radio edit) – 3:32
2. "Adelante" (Avancada remix) – 7:26
- Australian CD single
1. "Adelante" (original 7-inch radio edit)
2. "Adelante" (original 12-inch)
3. "Adelante" (DuMonde remix)
4. "Adelante" (Ruff Driverz remix)
5. "Adelante" (Cosmic Gate remix)
6. "Adelante" (Avancada remix)

== Charts ==
=== Weekly charts ===
Chart (1999–2000)	Peak position
Australia (ARIA)	4
Belgium (Ultratop 50 Flanders)	3
Belgium (Ultratop 50 Wallonia)	11
Denmark (IFPI)	3
Europe (Eurochart Hot 100)	5
Finland (Suomen virallinen lista)	10
France (SNEP)	37
Germany (GfK)	17
Ireland (IRMA)	11
Ireland Dance (IRMA)	2
Netherlands (Dutch Top 40 Tipparade)	3
Netherlands (Single Top 100)	49
Norway (VG-lista)	7
Romania (Romanian Top 100)	1
Scotland Singles (Official Charts)	1
Spain (Promusicae)	11
Sweden (Sverigetopplistan)	7
Switzerland (Schweizer Hitparade)	18
UK Singles (Official Charts)	2
UK Dance (Official Charts)	11

=== Year-end charts ===
Chart (1999)	Position
Sweden (Hitlistan)	92

Chart (2000)	Position
Australia (ARIA)	69
Belgium (Ultratop 50 Wallonia)	65
Europe (Eurochart Hot 100)	72
Ireland (IRMA)	95
Romania (Romanian Top 100)	18
Sweden (Hitlistan)	68
UK Singles (OCC)	84

== Certifications ==
Region	Certification	Certified units/sales
Australia (ARIA)	Gold	35,000^{^}
Belgium (BRMA)	Gold	25,000^{*}
Sweden (GLF)	Platinum	30,000^{^}
United Kingdom (BPI)	Silver	200,000^{‡}
^{*} Sales figures based on certification alone.^{^} Shipments figures based on certification alone.^{‡} Sales+streaming figures based on certification alone.

== Release history ==
Region	Date	Format(s)	Label(s)	Ref.
Europe	6 December 1999	Maxi-CD	X-IT	
United Kingdom	31 January 2000	12-inch vinyl; CD; cassette	Multiply	

== See also ==
- List of Romanian Top 100 number ones of the 2000s
