= Martillo Vago =

German musician (??–2019)

Peter Faulhammer (died May 2019) also known as Martillo Vago, is a former member of Sash!. Martillo Vago is a transliteration of Faulhammer's last name.

Martillo Vago's hits include "Por què no" and "Que es la vida". Under the name Peter Faulhammer, he is featured alongside Rodriguez in Sash!'s international hit "Adelante" where he is credited with his name Peter Faulhammer.

He inspired another group called Ovni Vago with expected release "Por qué no podéis", which is a metaphor of the desire of the fans.

== Discography ==
=== Singles ===
Featured in

List of singles, with selected chart positions and certifications, showing year released and album name
Year	Single	Peak chart positions										Certifications
Year	Single	GER	AU	FIN	FRA	IRE	NLD	NOR	SWE	SWI	UK	Certifications
2000	"Adelante" (Sash! featuring Peter Faulhammer & Rodriguez)	17	4	—	37	11	49	7	7	18	2	AUS: Gold; SWE: Platinum
