= TJ Davis =

English singer

- Born: Teresa Jane Davis; Leeds, England
- Genres: Eurobeat; hi-NRG; trance
- Occupations: Singer; songwriter; record producer
- Instrument: Vocals
- Years active: 1988–present
- Labels: MCA; Time; Walt Disney
- Website: Official website

Teresa Jane Davis is an English singer, songwriter and record producer. She started as a backing vocalist for Gary Numan, D:Ream and Blur, and quickly developed a career of her own. She is known for her work with composer Richard Jacques on video game music for the soundtracks of Sonic R and Metropolis Street Racer. She was a member of ABBA tribute group Björn Again, performing as "Frida Longstockin" from 1997 to 2004.

Her track "Brilliant Feeling", billed as "Full Monty Allstars featuring TJ Davis", peaked at No. 72 on the UK Singles Chart in July 1996. She also released the trance single "Wonderful Life" – a cover of the song by Black – in December 2001. It was a collaboration with trance outfit Ian van Dahl, and reached No. 42 on the UK Singles Chart. In 2002, Davis recorded the vocals on the Sash! song "I Believe".

On 28 September 2024, Davis made her public appearance at the Sonic Symphony World Tour concert in London, England, performing alongside Richard Jacques. She made another public appearance at the 2025 Super MAGFest.

== Discography ==
=== Singles ===
- "Brilliant Feeling" (1996) - UK #72, UK Dance #19
- "Wonderful Life" (2001) - UK #42, UK Dance #13
- "I Believe" (with Sash!) (2003) - AUS #63, GER #67
- "The Top" (2007)

=== Albums ===
- "New Frontiers" (2026)

=== Video Games ===
- Sonic R (1997) - vocals
- Metropolis Street Racer (2000) - vocals
