= Stay (Sash! song) =

1997 single by Sash!

- German maxi-CD single artwork

Single by Sash! featuring La Trec

from the album It's My Life – The Album
- Released: 26 September 1997
- Genre: Euro-NRG; house
- Length: 3:34
- Label: X-It; Mighty
- Songwriters: Franky McCoy; Ralf Kappmeier; Sascha Lappessen; Thomas Allison
- Producers: Tokapi; Sash!

Sash! singles chronology
"Ecuador" (1997)	"Stay" (1997)	"La Primavera" (1998)

Music video
- "Stay" on YouTube

Alternative cover
- UK CD2 artwork

"Stay" is a song by German DJ/production team Sash! featuring American singer La Trec. It was released on 26 September 1997 by Mighty and Multiply as the fourth and final single from their debut album, It's My Life – The Album (1997). The song was written by Franky McCoy, Ralf Kappmeier, Sascha Lappessen and Thomas Allison, and topped the dance charts in both Canada and the United States. It also reached the top 20 in more than 10 European countries as well as in New Zealand. On the Eurochart Hot 100, "Stay" peaked at number six and in the UK, it was Sash!'s third consecutive number-two single. The accompanying music video was directed by Oliver Sommer and filmed in Paris, France. In 1998, DJ Magazine included "Stay" in their list of "Top 100 Club Tunes".

== Critical reception ==
The song was universally acclaimed across the music press. Scottish Aberdeen Press and Journal viewed it as "Sash’s better effort". Jon O'Brien from AllMusic noted the "dramatic" spoken word intro, describing the song as "an epic slice of soulful Hi-NRG pop". Larry Flick from Billboard magazine wrote, "The time has come for this internationally acclaimed producer/musician to finally crack the pop charts. By drafting the belting skills of La Trec for this rare vocal track from his fine album, It's My Life, he offers his most viable mainstream contender to date. The track thumps with Euro-NRG intensity, while a swirl of colorful synths fleshes out the song's simple yet wickedly infectious melody. La Trec, a singer to keep a close eye on, struts across the groove with enough force to please clubheads, but with the sweet allure that popsters require."

A reviewer from Music Week gave "Stay" a score of four out of five, declaring it "another trancey house stomper. Built around the gospel-like uplifting vocals of San Francisco-born La Trec." Another Music Week editor, Alan Jones, constated that Sash! "are likely to get, their third consecutive smash", complimenting the singer's "gutsy femme vocal".

== Chart performance ==
"Stay" climbed to number one on both the Canadian RPM Dance chart and the US Billboard Hot Dance Club Play chart. In Europe, the single entered the top 10 in Belgium, Denmark, Finland, Hungary, Ireland, Italy, Lithuania, the Netherlands, Norway, and the United Kingdom, as well as on the Eurochart Hot 100. In the UK, "Stay" reached number two during its first week on the UK Singles Chart, on October 12, 1997. Additionally, it was a top-20 hit in Germany, Sweden and Switzerland (19). In Oceania, it peaked at numbers 12 and 24 in New Zealand and Australia, respectively. The single earned a gold record in Belgium, Norway and the United Kingdom.

== Music video ==
The accompanying music video for "Stay" was directed by Oliver Sommer and filmed in Quartier de La Défense in Paris, France. It was produced by AVA Studios GmbH and depicts Sascha Lappessen and La Trec in a dream, where he is being chased by female agents in and around a highrise building. On MTV Europe, some scenes in the video was left out from the original music video. Sommer had previously directed the video for "Encore une fois" and would also be directing the video for the team's next single, "La Primavera". "Stay" was later made available by Altra Moda Music on YouTube in 2016 and had generated more than 33 million views as of September 2025.

== Track listings ==
- German 12-inch single

A1. "Stay" (original 12-inch) – 5:54
A2. "Stay" (Exit EEE remix) – 5:53
B1. "Stay" (Magnificent 4 remix) – 6:01
B2. "Stay" (2 Phunky People remix) – 5:54

- German 12-inch remix single

A1. "Stay" (Armand van Helden "Kano" Remix) – 7:34
A2. "Stay" (Armand van Helden "Soul Solution" Remix) – 7:41
B1. "Stay" (Exit EEE's Fly So High dub) – 6:15
B2. "Stay" (Boris & Beck remix) – 7:10

- German maxi-CD single
1. "Stay" (single edit) – 3:29
2. "Stay" (original 12-inch) – 5:54
3. "Stay" (Exit-Eee remix) – 5:53
4. "Stay" (Magnificent 4 remix) – 6:01
5. "Stay" (2 Phunky People remix) – 5:54
- UK CD1
1. "Stay" (original single edit) – 3:29
2. "Stay" (Armand van Helden "Kano" Remix) – 7:25
3. "Stay" (Exit-EEE remix) – 5:53
4. "Stay" (PowerPlant "Suck This" mix) – 7:46
5. "Stay" (Loop Da Loop's vocal mix) – 7:42
- UK CD2
1. "Stay" (original single edit) – 3:29
2. "Stay" (Eat Me edit) – 3:52
3. "Stay" (The Lisa Marie Vocal Experience) – 8:37
4. "Stay" (Magnificent 4 remix) – 6:01
5. "Stay" (2 Phunky People remix) – 5:54
6. "Stay" (original 12-inch) – 5:55

== Charts ==
=== Weekly charts ===
Weekly chart performance for "Stay"
Chart (1997–1998)	Peak position
Australia (ARIA)	24
Austria (Ö3 Austria Top 40)	39
Belgium (Ultratop 50 Flanders)	3
Belgium (Ultratop 50 Wallonia)	4
Belgium Dance (Ultratop Flanders)	10
Canada Dance/Urban (RPM)	1
Denmark (IFPI)	3
Europe (Eurochart Hot 100)	6
Europe Border Breakers (Music & Media)	3
Finland (Suomen virallinen lista)	6
France (SNEP)	23
Germany (GfK)	12
Hungary (Mahasz)	6
Ireland (IRMA)	6
Italy (Musica e dischi)	2
Lithuania (M-1)	4
Netherlands (Dutch Top 40)	6
Netherlands (Single Top 100)	9
New Zealand (Recorded Music NZ)	12
Norway (VG-lista)	3
Scottish Singles Sales (Official Charts)	2
Sweden (Sverigetopplistan)	12
Switzerland (Schweizer Hitparade)	19
UK Singles (Official Charts)	2
US Dance Club Play (Billboard)	1

=== Year-end charts ===
1997 year-end chart performance for "Stay"
Chart (1997)	Position
Belgium (Ultratop 50 Flanders)	14
Belgium (Ultratop 50 Wallonia)	25
Europe (Eurochart Hot 100)	39
Germany (Media Control)	93
Netherlands (Dutch Top 40)	66
Netherlands (Single Top 100)	45
Norway (VG-lista)	17
Romania (Romanian Top 100)	29
Sweden (Topplistan)	48
UK Singles (OCC)	30

1998 year-end chart performance for "Stay"
Chart (1998)	Position
Canada Dance/Urban (RPM)	28
Europe Border Breakers (Music & Media)	47
US Dance Club Play (Billboard)	10

== Certifications ==
Certifications and sales for "Stay"
Region	Certification	Certified units/sales
Belgium (BRMA)	Gold	25,000^{*}
Norway (IFPI Norway)	Gold	
United Kingdom (BPI)	Gold	400,000^{^}
^{*} Sales figures based on certification alone.^{^} Shipments figures based on certification alone.

== Release history ==
Release dates and formats for "Stay"
Region	Date	Format(s)	Label(s)	Ref.
Belgium	26 September 1997	CD	Byte	
Germany	29 September 1997	CD	Mighty	
