= Encore! (singer) =

German singer

- Born: 12 August 1974 (age 52)
- Origin: Germany
- Genre: Trance
- Occupation: Vocals
- Years active: 1995–present

Sabine Ohmes (born August 12, 1974), better known by her stage name Encore!, is a German singer who performs mainly in French. Ohmes adopted her stage name after her debut as the vocalist on the Sash! track "Encore une fois", which reached No. 2 on the UK Singles Chart.

== Musical career ==
She reached No. 12 as a soloist in the UK with her own track "Le Disc Jockey" and later released the single "Le Paradis". Both songs were written by Sash!'s producers, Ralf Kappmeier and Thomas Lüdke (known as the Tokapi production team).

Encore! also worked with Sash! singing on the track "Le Soleil Noir" on their third album, Trilenium. The song was later mixed and unsuccessfully released solely by Encore!.
