= Mysterious Times =

1998 single by Sash!

- German CD single artwork

Single by Sash! featuring Tina Cousins

from the album Life Goes On
- Released: 1 August 1998
- Length: 5:22 (original version); 3:33 (radio edit)
- Label: X-IT; Club Tools; Edel
- Songwriters: Sascha Lappessen; Ralf Kappmeier; Thomas Alisson
- Producers: Sash!; Tokapi

Sash! singles chronology
"La Primavera" (1998)	"Mysterious Times" (1998)	"Move Mania" (1998)

Tina Cousins singles chronology
"Angel" (1997)	"Mysterious Times" (1998)	"Pray" (1998)

Music video
- "Mysterious Times" on YouTube

Alternative cover
- UK CD1 artwork

"Mysterious Times" is a song by German production group Sash! featuring British singer Tina Cousins. It was released on 1 August 1998 as the second single from their second album, Life Goes On (1998). The song peaked at number two in the United Kingdom, giving Sash! their fourth number-two single. In the United States, it peaked at number 11 on the Billboard Dance Club Play chart in January 2000.

== Critical reception ==
Jon O'Brien from AllMusic stated that "Mysterious Times" is "arguably his best single", describing it as a "subtle attempt at progressive house." A reviewer from Daily Record commented, "Dance guru Sash! is in disappointing form here as he takes his production expertise to a previously undiscovered level of bland." The newspaper also complimented Cousins' "melodramatic vocals" on the track.

== Chart performance ==
"Mysterious Times" entered the top 10 in Denmark, Finland, Italy, and Norway, as well as on the Eurochart Hot 100, where it reached number six. In the United Kingdom, the single peaked at number two during its first week on the UK Singles Chart, on 9 August 1998. Additionally, "Mysterious Times" was a top-20 hit in Belgium (Flanders and Wallonia), France, Germany, Ireland, the Netherlands, and Sweden. In Iceland and Switzerland, it charted within the top 30. Outside Europe, it peaked at number 11 on the US Billboard Dance Club Play chart, number 28 on the New Zealand Singles Chart, and number 62 on the Australian Singles Chart. The single earned a gold record in Belgium, France, and Sweden. In the UK, it received a silver disc on 11 September 1998.

== Music video ==
A music video was made for "Mysterious Times", directed by Sven Harding.

== Track listings ==
- German maxi-CD single
1. "Mysterious Times" (radio mix) – 3:32
2. "Mysterious Times" (Todd Terry's radio edit) – 3:26
3. "Mysterious Times" (original maxi) – 5:22
4. "Mysterious Times" (Cyrus & The Joker Meets Bossi mix) – 7:34
5. "Mysterious Times" (John B. Norman mix) – 7:04
6. "Mysterious Times" (Todd Terry's club mix) – 6:52
- European CD single
1. "Mysterious Times" (radio mix) – 3:32
2. "Mysterious Times" (Todd Terry's radio edit) – 3:26
- UK cassette single
1. "Mysterious Times" (radio mix) – 3:32
2. "Mysterious Times" (Todd Terry's club mix) – 6:52
- UK CD1
1. "Mysterious Times" (radio mix) – 3:32
2. "Mysterious Times" (Tin Tin Out mix) – 6:09
3. "Mysterious Times" (John B. Norman mix) – 7:04
4. "Mysterious Times" (video)
- UK CD2
1. "Mysterious Times" (radio edit) – 3:32
2. "Mysterious Times" (Todd Terry club mix) – 6:52
3. "Mysterious Times" (Cyrus & The Joker Meets Bossi mix) – 7:34
- Australian CD single
1. "Mysterious Times" (radio edit) – 3:32
2. "Mysterious Times" (Todd Terry club mix) – 6:52
3. "Mysterious Times" (Cyrus & The Joker Meets Bossi mix) – 7:34
4. "Mysterious Times" (John B. Norman mix) – 7:04
5. "Mysterious Times" (Superstring remix) – 7:46
- Japanese CD single
1. "Mysterious Times" – 3:40
2. "Mysterious Times" (John B. Norman mix) – 7:04
3. "Mysterious Times" (Cyrus & The Joker Meets Bossi mix) – 7:35

== Charts ==
=== Weekly charts ===
Chart (1998–2000)	Peak position
Australia (ARIA)	62
Belgium (Ultratop 50 Flanders)	13
Belgium (Ultratop 50 Wallonia)	14
Denmark (IFPI)	6
Europe (Eurochart Hot 100)	6
Finland (Suomen virallinen lista)	8
France (SNEP)	16
Germany (GfK)	17
Iceland (Íslenski Listinn Topp 40)	22
Ireland (IRMA)	11
Italy (Musica e dischi)	5
Netherlands (Dutch Top 40)	17
Netherlands (Single Top 100)	17
New Zealand (Recorded Music NZ)	28
Norway (VG-lista)	5
Scottish Singles Sales (Official Charts)	2
Sweden (Sverigetopplistan)	17
Switzerland (Schweizer Hitparade)	23
UK Singles (Official Charts)	2
US Dance Club Play (Billboard)	11

=== Year-end charts ===
Chart (1998)	Position
Belgium (Ultratop 50 Flanders)	96
Belgium (Ultratop 50 Wallonia)	80
Europe (Eurochart Hot 100)	54
France (SNEP)	85
Sweden (Hitlistan)	93
UK Singles (OCC)	47

== Certifications ==
Region	Certification	Certified units/sales
Belgium (BRMA)	Gold	25,000^{*}
France (SNEP)	Gold	250,000^{*}
Sweden (GLF)	Gold	15,000^{^}
United Kingdom (BPI)	Silver	200,000^{^}
^{*} Sales figures based on certification alone.^{^} Shipments figures based on certification alone.
