= Ecuador (song) =

1997 single by Sash!

Single by Sash! featuring Rodriguez

from the album It's My Life – The Album
- Language: Spanish
- Released: 22 April 1997
- Genre: Eurodance; techno
- Length: 3:34
- Label: X-It; Mighty
- Songwriters: Ralf Kappmeier; Sascha Lappessen; Thomas Lüdke
- Producers: Tokapi; Sash!

Sash! singles chronology
"Encore une fois" (1996)	"Ecuador" (1997)	"Stay" (1997)

Rodriguez singles chronology
"Ecuador" (1997)	"Adelante" (1999)

Music video
- "Ecuador" on YouTube

"Ecuador" is a song produced by German DJ and record production team Sash! featuring fellow German DJ Rodriguez. It was released in April 1997 as the third single from their debut album, It's My Life – The Album (1997). It is written by Ralf Kappmeier, Sascha Lappessen and Thomas Lüdke, and produced by Lappessen and Tokapi. The song became an international hit, peaking at number one in Flanders, Romania and Scotland, as well as on both the American and Canadian dance charts. It reached the top 20 in more than ten other countries worldwide. The accompanying music video was directed by Oliver Sommer and filmed in Spain.

== Critical reception ==
Scottish Daily Record complimented "Ecuador" as an "intelligent dance hit" and a "catchy number". Daisy & Havoc from Music Week's RM gave it a score of three out of five, adding that it's "more listenable in our opinion than the mega success 'Encore'".

== Chart performance ==
In the United Kingdom, "Ecuador" reached number two on the UK Singles Chart on 5 July 1997, earning Sash! a platinum certification for sales and streams in excess of 600,000 units. It was kept from the number-one position by "I'll Be Missing You" by Puff Daddy & Faith Evans. "Ecuador" reached number one in the Flanders region of Belgium, Romania and Scotland and the top 10 in Denmark, Finland, Germany, Ireland, the Netherlands, Norway, Sweden and Switzerland.

It also reached the top 20 in Austria, France and Iceland. On the Eurochart Hot 100, "Ecuador" peaked at number three. In the United States, the song was the second number-one on the Billboard Dance Club Play chart for Sash!. It was a more successful dance hit in Canada, becoming Sash!'s first number one on the RPM Dance chart, staying at the top position for four weeks and ending the year as Canada's second-most successful dance single. In West Asia, it became a top-5 hit in Israel, peaking at number four on 27 May 1997 and stayed at that position for four weeks.

== Music video ==
The music video for "Ecuador" was directed by Oliver Sommer, who had previously directed the videos for "Encore une fois" and "Stay". It was produced by AVA Studios GmbH and filmed in Lanzarote and Tenerife, Spain. The video features female models appearing like bird-like creatures in a desert landscape.

== Impact and legacy ==
In 1998, DJ Magazine ranked "Ecuador" number 69 in their list of "Top 100 Club Tunes". In 2020, RedBull.com ranked it number two in their "10 Underrated Dance Songs from the 1990s That Still Sound Amazing", writing, "Yeah, yeah – we know that 'Encore une fois' is Sash!'s most iconic song, but this follow-up – also released in the German duo's breakthrough year of 1997 – is every bit as good. Like its mega-selling predecessor, it didn't matter that you hadn't a clue what the lyrics were: that dinky little trance-pop riff was all you needed."

== Track listings ==
- UK CD1
1. "Ecuador" (original radio edit) – 3:31
2. "Ecuador" (Eat Me Edit – Bruce Wayne mix) – 3:57
3. "Ecuador" (K-Klass Klub mix) – 8:14
4. "Ecuador" (Bruce Wayne mix) – 5:48
5. "Ecuador" (Future Breeze mix) – 5:24
6. "Ecuador" (original 12-inch mix) – 5:23
7. "Ecuador" (Poweblast dub) – 7:30
- UK CD2
1. "Ecuador" (original radio edit) – 3:31
2. "Ecuador" (Klubbheads mix) – 6:31
3. "Encore une fois" (ACD mix) – 6:13
4. "Ecuador" (PowerPlant "Inject This" mix) – 7:21

== Charts ==
=== Weekly charts ===
Chart (1997–2016)	Peak position
Australia (ARIA)	52
Austria (Ö3 Austria Top 40)	16
Belgium (Ultratop 50 Flanders)	1
Belgium (Ultratop 50 Wallonia)	2
Canada Dance/Urban (RPM)	1
Denmark (IFPI)	3
Europe (Eurochart Hot 100)	3
Finland (Suomen virallinen lista)	3
France (SNEP)	12
Germany (GfK)	7
Iceland (Íslenski Listinn Topp 40)	12
Ireland (IRMA)	4
Israel (Israeli Singles Chart)	4
Netherlands (Dutch Top 40)	8
Netherlands (Single Top 100)	8
New Zealand (Recorded Music NZ)	40
Norway (VG-lista)	4
Romania (Romanian Top 100)	1
Scottish Singles Sales (Official Charts)	1
Sweden (Sverigetopplistan)	4
Switzerland (Schweizer Hitparade)	8
UK Singles (Official Charts)	2
US Dance Club Play (Billboard)	1

=== Year-end charts ===
Chart (1997)	Position
Belgium (Ultratop 50 Flanders)	5
Belgium (Ultratop 50 Wallonia)	12
Canada Dance/Urban (RPM)	2
Europe (Eurochart Hot 100)	29
France (SNEP)	56
Germany (Media Control)	50
Israel (Israeli Singles Chart)	12
Netherlands (Dutch Top 40)	45
Netherlands (Single Top 100)	50
Romania (Romanian Top 100)	10
Sweden (Topplistan)	36
Switzerland (Schweizer Hitparade)	45
UK Singles (OCC)	27
UK Club Chart (Music Week)	75

=== Decade-end charts ===
Chart (1990–1999)	Rank
Belgium (Ultratop 50 Flanders)	36

== Certifications ==
Region	Certification	Certified units/sales
Belgium (BRMA)	Gold	25,000^{*}
Denmark (IFPI Danmark) Sash	Gold	45,000^{‡}
Denmark (IFPI Danmark) Sash vs. Olly James	Gold	45,000^{‡}
France (SNEP)	Gold	250,000^{*}
Sweden (GLF)	Gold	15,000^{^}
United Kingdom (BPI) Digital sales since 2007	Platinum	600,000^{‡}
United Kingdom (BPI) Physical sales	Gold	400,000^{^}
^{*} Sales figures based on certification alone.^{^} Shipments figures based on certification alone.^{‡} Sales+streaming figures based on certification alone.

== Covers and samples ==
In 2006, Dutch Eurodance group Starstylers released “Keep On Moving” which samples “Ecuador”. The song charted in Belgium, France, and The Netherlands.

On 15 March 2013, ItaloBrothers released the single "This Is Nightlife", which interpolates "Ecuador".

On 20 January 2023, Portuguese DJ Drenchill released the single "Starlight" featuring Jorik Burema, which interpolates "Ecuador".

On 28 April 2023, in collaboration with Dutch-Moroccan DJ and producer R3hab and Romanian singer Inna, Sash! released the single "Rock My Body", which also heavily interpolates "Ecuador". The single "Rock My Body" was released by the Dutch label Spinnin' Records.
