= Encore une fois =

1997 single by Sash!

Single by Sash!

from the album It's My Life – The Album
- Language: French
- English title: "One More Time"
- Released: 1996
- Genre: Eurodance; trance
- Length: 3:41
- Label: Mighty
- Songwriters: Ralf Kappmeier; Sascha Lappessen; Thomas Lüdke
- Producers: Tokapi; Sash!

Sash! singles chronology
"It's My Life" (1996)	"Encore une fois" (1996)	"Ecuador" (1997)

Music video
- "Encore une fois" on YouTube

"Encore une fois" ([ɑ̃.kɔʁ yn fwa]; English: "One More Time") is a song by German DJ group Sash!, first released in 1996 on Mighty Records. It was released as the second single from the group's debut album, It's My Life – The Album (1997). The song's French vocals are performed by German vocalist Sabine Ohmes.

Upon the song's release in the UK, the song reached number two on the UK Singles Chart in February 1997. Throughout Europe, the track became a top-10 hit in countries such as Belgium, Finland, France, Iceland, Italy, Norway, Spain and Sweden. In Greece and Ireland, the song reached the top of the charts. In the United States, it became a club hit and peaked at number one on the Billboard Dance Club Play chart, staying on the chart for 14 weeks. The accompanying music video was directed by Oliver Sommer and filmed at a train station in Cologne, Germany.

Eleven years after it was first released, the song again reached the top 40 in three countries as part of a mashup. The music from Sash!'s hit was combined with the vocals from Stunt's "Raindrops" to create the new track "Raindrops (Encore une fois)".

== Release ==
"Encore une fois" was initially meant to be a big club record, but it outgrew that and the group would become a pop act in its own right. Two main versions of the song exist. One is the original edit, which was used in the music video and appeared (in extended form) on Sash!'s debut album It's My Life. The second is the Future Breeze edit, which is a much harder version of the track. It appears on Sash!'s best-of albums and as a bonus track (in extended form) on It's My Life – The Album.

When the single was originally released, a pressing-plant error swapped the first two tracks (Original and Future Breeze edits) thus giving the Future Breeze remix accidental success; it therefore became the official version.

== Critical reception ==
Barry Walters for The Advocate said, "Ripping off all those intensely dramatic Rollo mixes for Faithless, Kristine W, and others, that trance track you keep hearing with the girl screaming in French defines clubland à la mode — fabulous now, soon tired." Jon O'Brien from AllMusic noted its "pizzicato sounds". Chuck Campbell from Knoxville News Sentinel felt that "a smoky undercurrent" on tracks like "Encore Une Fois" "expose the darker side of dance music." British magazine Music Week gave it a score of three out of five, writing, "Topping the import charts and with a buzz on dance radio, this storming floor-filler could well find its way into the Top 40." A reviewer from Smash Hits commented, "Think Faithless' 'Insomnia' in a trancey continental style", and remarked that the song is "big on the synth stabs, massive on bangin' 4/4 beats, huge on some husky French bird screaming, "Encore une fois!"." In 2013, the Official UK Chart named "Encore une fois" a "pop gem" and a "classic Eurodance anthem", and inducted the song into its "Pop Gem Hall of Fame".

== Chart performance ==
In Europe, "Encore une fois" peaked at number one on in both Greece and Ireland, as well as on the Eurochart Hot 100. The single also reached number two in Denmark and the United Kingdom. In the UK, it peaked first week on the UK Singles Chart, on 23 February 1997. On the UK Dance Chart, "Encore une fois" reached number one. It additionally entered the top 10 in Belgium (Flanders and Wallonia), Finland, France, Iceland, Italy, the Netherlands, Norway, Spain and Sweden. In New Zealand and Australia, the single reached numbers 34 and 35, respectively. On the US Billboard Dance Club Play chart, it reached number one and remained on the chart for a total of 14 weeks. In West Asia, the song became a top-10 hit in Israel, peaking at number seven on 18 March 1997.

== Music video ==
The music video for "Encore une fois" was directed by Oliver Sommer and filmed at a train station in Cologne, Germany. Justin Myers of OCC wrote in 2013, "Warning: the video is very, um, 'of its time', so expect lots of speeded-up footage of people hanging around bus stations and 12" records flying through the air because DJ."

Two versions of the video exist, one with the Original Edit and one with the Blunt Radio Edit (an edited version of the Future Breeze Remix). The former can be seen on 10th Anniversary's bonus DVD and the later can be seen on Altra Mode Music's official YouTube channel. By June 2025, the video had generated more than 24 million views on the platform.

== Track listings ==
- CD 1
1. "Encore une fois" (Original Edit) – 3:38
2. "Encore une fois" (Future Breeze Edit) – 3:38
3. "Encore une fois" (Future Breeze Mix) – 6:25
4. "Encore une fois" (Original 12" Mix) – 6:28
5. "Encore une fois" (Merlyn and Chuck Mellom Mix) – 5:50
6. "Encore une fois" (La Casa De Tokapi Mix) – 5:19
- CD 2
1. "Encore une fois" (Blunt Radio Edit) – 3:49
2. "Encore une fois" (Future Breeze) – 6:29
3. "Encore une fois" (La Casa Di Tokapi) – 5:22
4. "Encore une fois" (Dancing Divas Club Remix) – 7:24
5. "Encore une fois" (The Powerplant Remix) – 9:42
6. "Encore une fois" (Original 12") – 6:27

== Charts ==
=== Weekly charts ===
Chart (1997)	Peak position
Australia (ARIA)	35
Austria (Ö3 Austria Top 40)	13
Belgium (Ultratop 50 Flanders)	5
Belgium (Ultratop 50 Wallonia)	5
Denmark (IFPI)	2
Europe (Eurochart Hot 100)	1
Europe Border Breakers (Music & Media)	2
Finland (Suomen virallinen lista)	5
France (SNEP)	7
Germany (GfK)	16
Iceland (Íslenski Listinn Topp 40)	5
Ireland (IRMA)	1
Israel (Israeli Singles Chart)	7
Italy (Musica e dischi)	4
Netherlands (Dutch Top 40)	9
Netherlands (Single Top 100)	14
New Zealand (Recorded Music NZ)	34
Norway (VG-lista)	4
Scottish Singles Sales (Official Charts)	2
Spain (AFYVE)	5
Sweden (Sverigetopplistan)	6
Switzerland (Schweizer Hitparade)	13
UK Singles (Official Charts)	2
UK Dance (Official Charts)	1
US Bubbling Under Hot 100 Singles (Billboard)	12
US Dance Club Play (Billboard)	1
US Maxi-Singles Sales (Billboard)	38

=== Year-end charts ===
Chart (1997)	Position
Belgium (Ultratop 50 Flanders)	27
Belgium (Ultratop 50 Wallonia)	34
Europe (Eurochart Hot 100)	17
Germany (Media Control)	96
Netherlands (Dutch Top 40)	82
Sweden (Topplistan)	73
UK Singles (OCC)	21
UK Club Chart (Music Week)	10
US Dance Club Play (Billboard)	20
