= Sash! =

German musical group

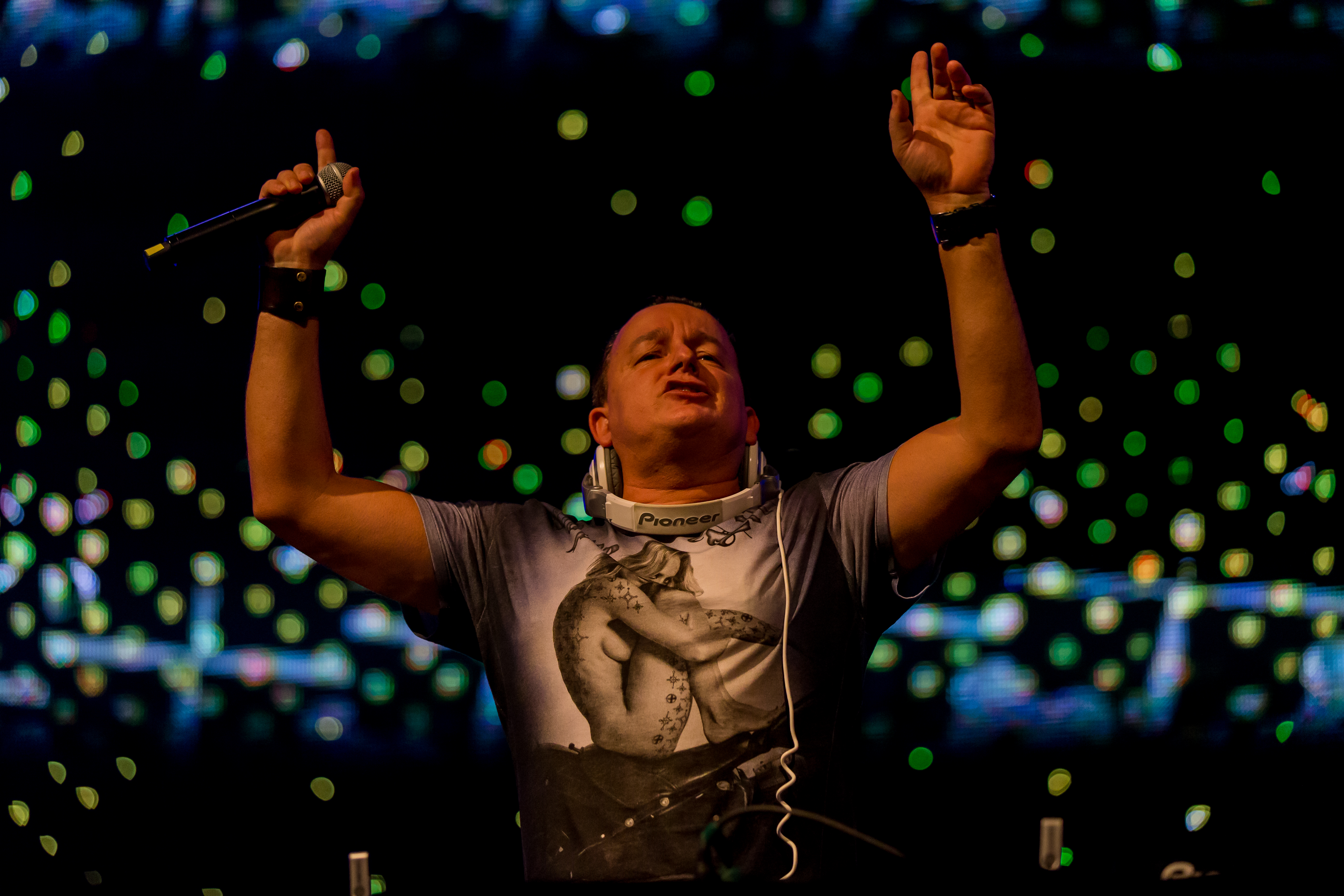
- Sash! during Sunshine Live "Die 90er – Live on Stage" at Maimarkt Halle, Mannheim, Baden-Württemberg, Germany on 29 November 2015

Background information
- Origin: Viersen, Germany
- Genres: Dance-pop, Eurodance, trance
- Years active: 1995–present
- Labels: Tokapi, Mighty
- Members: Sascha Lappessen; Ralf Kappmeier; Thomas Lüdke
- Website: www.dj-sash.com

Sash! (German pronunciation: [zaʃ]; stylised as SASH!) is a German DJ/production team, fronted by Sascha Lappessen (born 10 June 1970) who works in the recording studio with Ralf Kappmeier, Karl Xander, and Thomas "Alisson" Lüdke. In the UK, their first four hit singles incorporated vocals in different languages (French, Spanish, English and Italian).

== Musical career ==
=== 1995–1997: Formation and It's My Life – The Album ===
Sascha Lappessen, Thomas "Alisson" Lüdke, and Ralf Kappmeier founded SASH! in 1995. The previous year, the three had worked together, under the name of 'Careca', to produce a piece called "Indian Rave." In 1996, SASH! released "It's My Life", which became a European club hit. In 1997, with Sabine Ohmes as the singer, SASH! released "Encore une fois". It reached number 2 on the UK Singles Chart, as well as reaching the top 10 of five countries' singles charts and the top 20 of seven countries' singles charts and achieving their first and only number 1 anywhere to date in the Republic of Ireland.

In the same year, SASH! produced "Ecuador", and "Stay", which both also reached No. 2 in the UK. All hit singles are from the debut album It's My Life – The Album.

=== 1998–1999: Life Goes On ===
In 1998, SASH! released the first single from the second album Life Goes On, "La Primavera", which reached No. 3 in the UK, followed by "Mysterious Times" which became their fourth UK No. 2 hit, (No. 2), and "Move Mania" (No. 8). The following year, "Colour the World" peaked at No. 15 in the UK.

=== 2000–2003: Trilenium and S4! SASH! ===
In 1999, SASH! released "Adelante", the first single from the album Trilenium. It peaked at No. 2 on the UK Singles Chart in January 2000, their fifth single to reach that position.

Encore Une Fois – The Greatest Hits is the group's fourth album and was released on 30 October 2000.

In 2002, SASH! released the song "Ganbareh", which means "go for it". The song "Run" with Boy George was the next single release, with the new album released thereafter. The third single from the album S4!Sash! was "I Believe", which featured TJ Davis, and was released in 2003.

=== 2007: 10th Anniversary ===
10th Anniversary is the sixth album by SASH!. It includes 16 singles, a "reloaded" version of "Ecuador", previously unreleased songs, plus a bonus DVD including videoclips to all the songs from the album.

After fifteen years, all singles were released on one album, The Best Of. A new song called "Raindrops" reached No. 9 in the UK.

=== 2010–present ===
On 28 April 2023, Sash! released the single "Rock My Body", in collaboration with Dutch-Moroccan DJ and producer R3hab and Romanian singer Inna. The single interpolates "Ecuador".

== Discography ==
Studio albums

- It's My Life (1997)
- Life Goes On (1998)
- Trilenium (2000)
- S4!Sash! (2002)
- Life Is a Beach (2012)
- Life Changes (2013)
