= List of songs recorded by Steps =

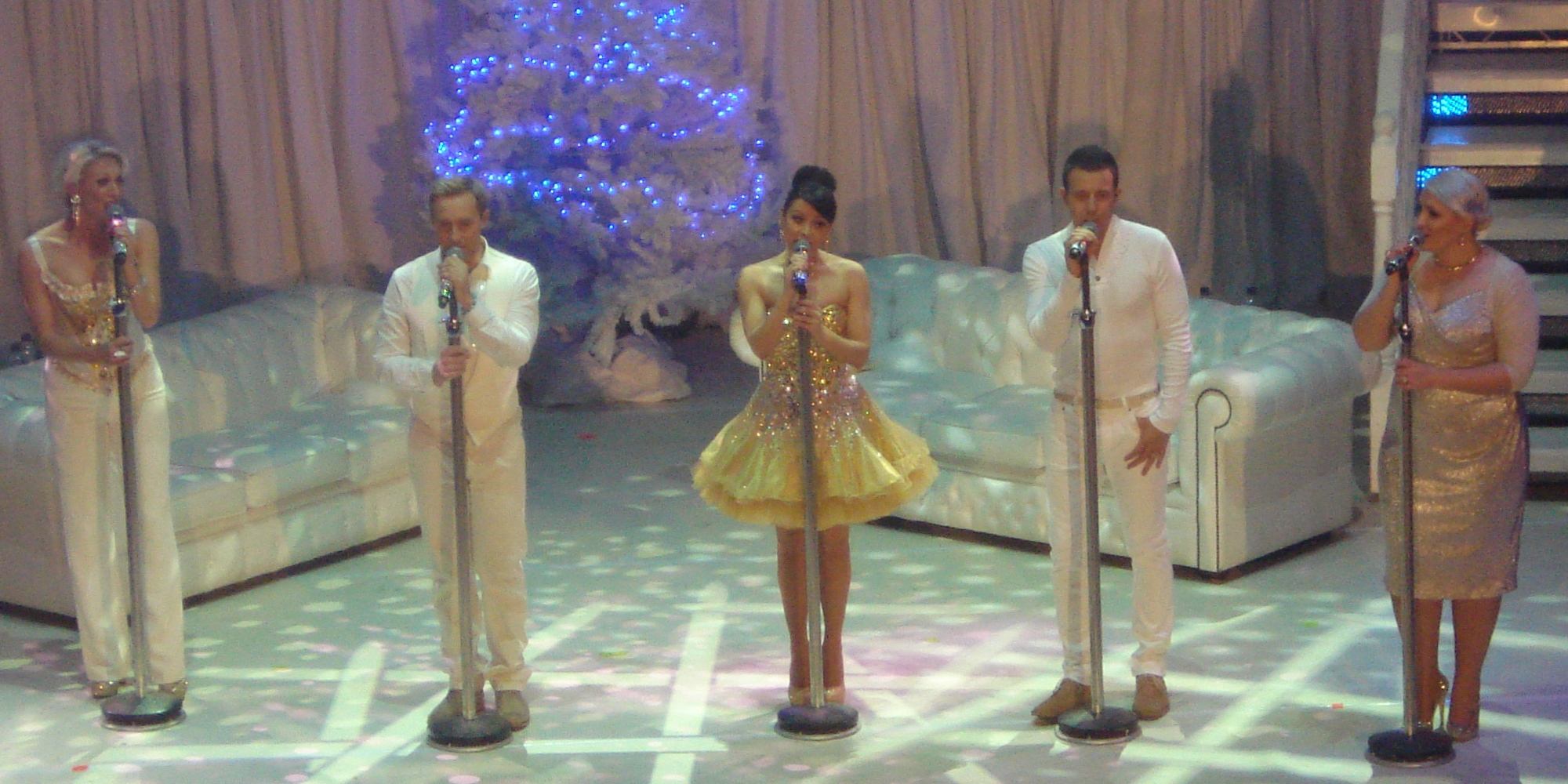
Steps performing live on their Christmas with Steps tour at the Manchester Apollo in December 2012

The British group Steps have recorded songs for seven studio albums (including a Christmas album), ten greatest hits and a tribute album. The band formed in 1997 after responding to an advert in the magazine The Stage, which asked for people to audition for a place in a pop band. Out of the thousands who applied, Lee Latchford-Evans, Lisa Scott-Lee, Faye Tozer, Claire Richards, and Ian "H" Watkins were successful in securing a place. The techno-pop song "5,6,7,8" was released as their debut single in 1997 and was followed by their debut album Step One the following year. "5,6,7,8" has been noted for being distinctly different from their subsequent releases due to its novelty line-dancing style and male lead vocals, whereas their songs thereafter are mostly sung by Richards.

Their songs and musical style have often been compared to ABBA but with modern and speedy sound as Pete quoted as ABBA on speed, with tracks such as "After the Love Has Gone" and "One for Sorrow" being so likened. The band members have occasionally co-written some of their songs, with all of them receiving songwriting credits for "Only in My Dreams" from their first greatest hits album, Gold: Greatest Hits (2001), while a large number of songs were written by Karl Twigg, Mark Topham, Andrew Frampton, and Pete Waterman. The group achieved fourteen consecutive top-five singles in the United Kingdom, including "Better Best Forgotten", "Say You'll Be Mine", "Deeper Shade of Blue", "It's the Way You Make Me Feel", and one of their two number-ones, "Stomp".

The group have covered a variety of well-known songs throughout their career, including their first number-one song "Tragedy" by the Bee Gees, "Chain Reaction" by Diana Ross, "Too Busy Thinking About My Baby" by The Temptations, and "Better the Devil You Know" by Kylie Minogue. In 1999, Steps recorded their own versions of "I Know Him So Well" and "Lay All Your Love on Me", as well as a medley entitled "Thank ABBA for the Music" for the ABBA tribute album; they also recorded "Dancing Queen" for their second greatest hits album, The Ultimate Collection (2011), and "Story of a Heart" for their fifth studio album, Tears on the Dancefloor (2017). Steps covered a selection of Christmas classics for their fourth studio album, Light Up the World (2012). They also had some notable cover tracks for their sixth album What the Future Holds (2020) and its sequel, the seventh album, What the Future Holds Pt. 2 (2021), as well as for the number-one anthology Platinum Collection (2022).

== Songs ==
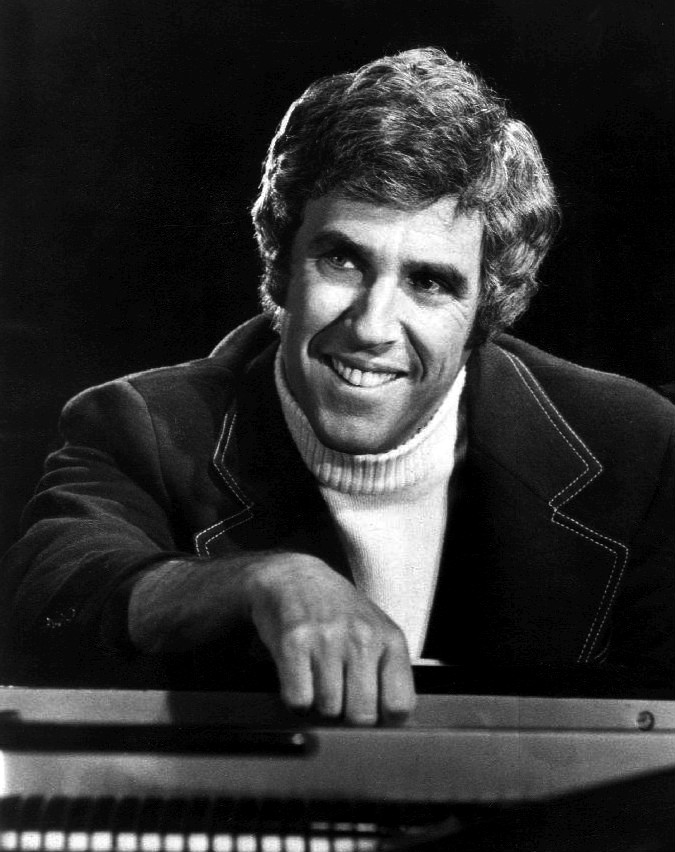
Steps covered "A House Is Not a Home" and "One Less Bell to Answer" co-written by Burt Bacharach.

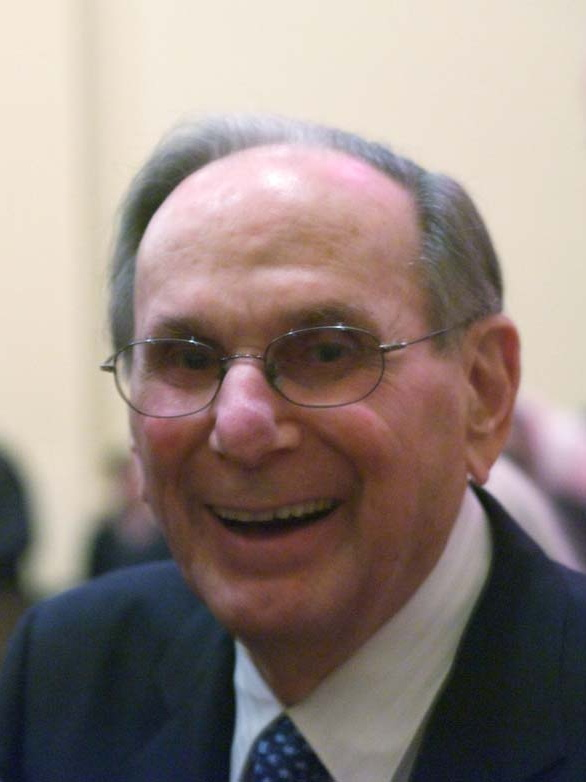
Steps covered "A House Is Not a Home" and "One Less Bell to Answer" co-written by Hal David.

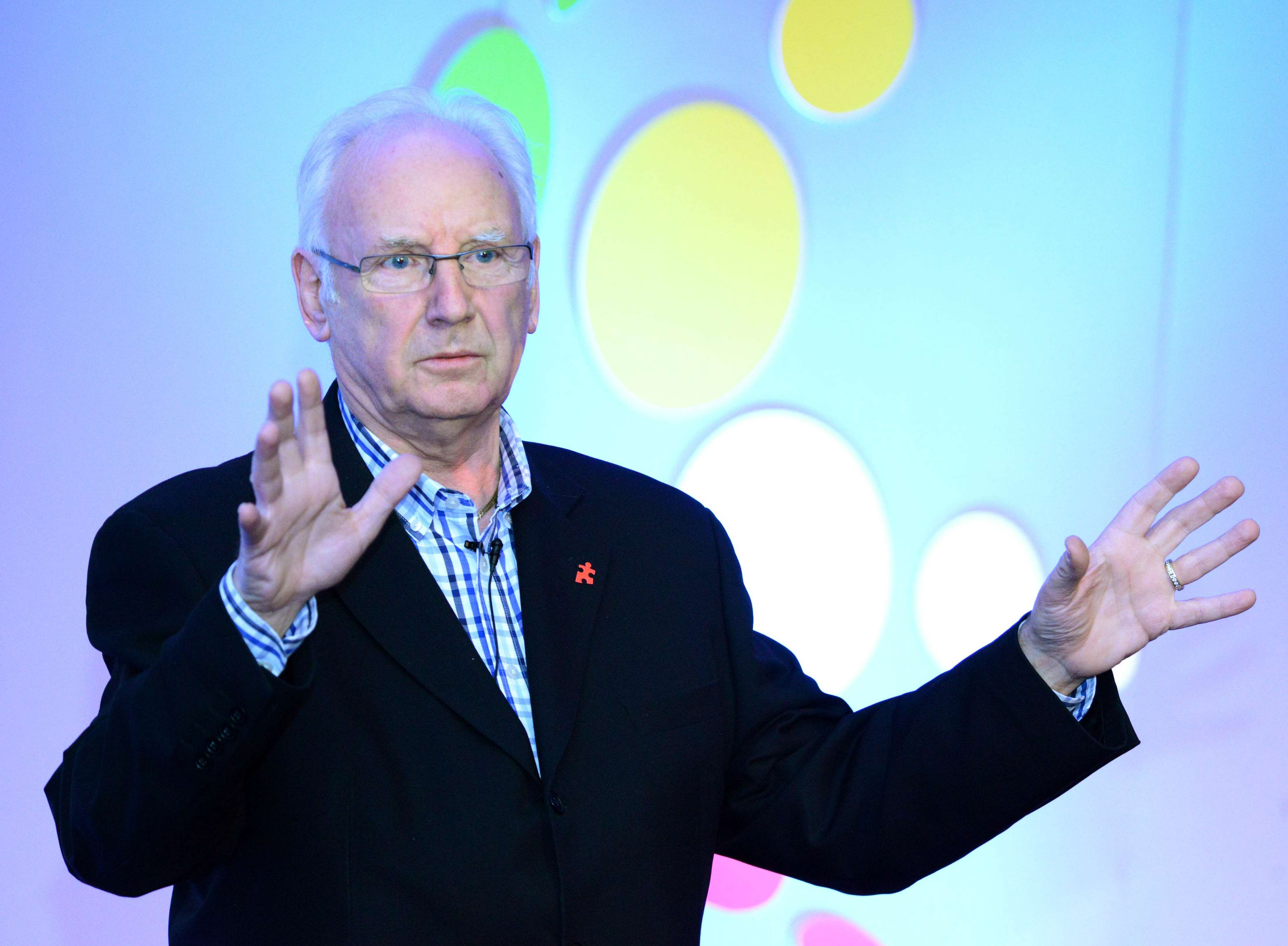
Pete Waterman has co-written many of the songs recorded by Steps.

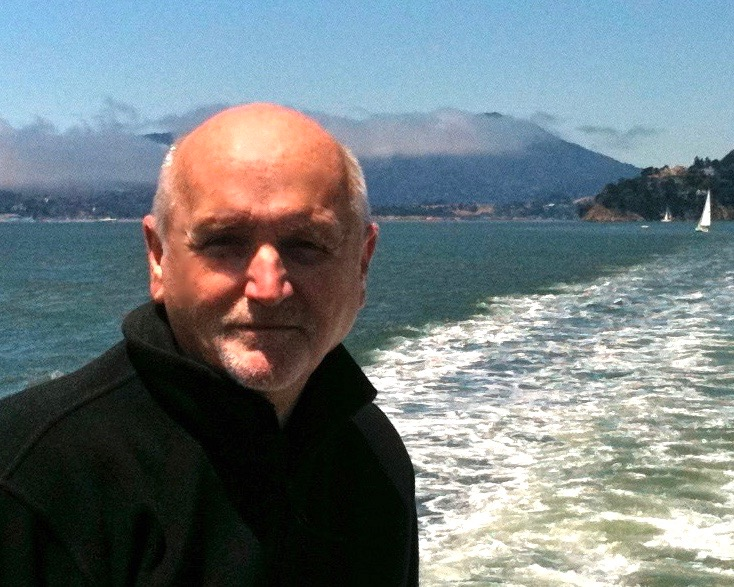
Mark Mueller co-wrote "Buzz" and "Wouldn't Hurt So Bad".

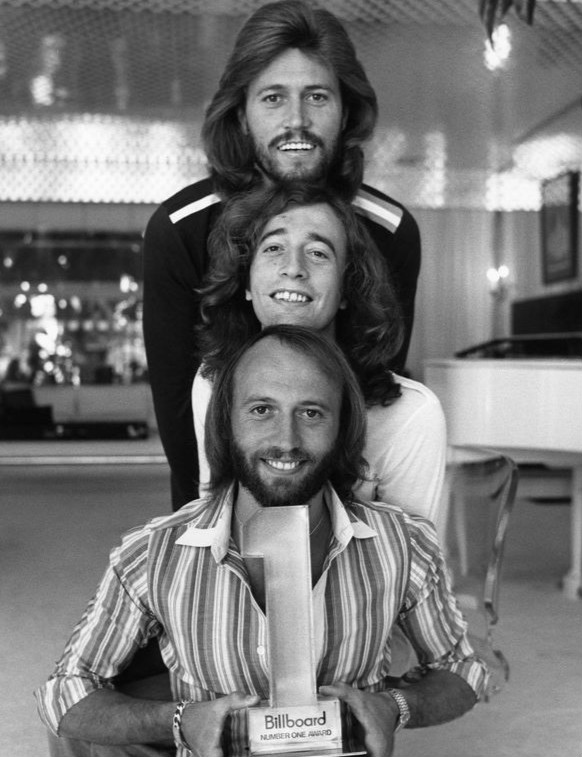
Steps covered two songs written by the Bee Gees: "Chain Reaction" and "Tragedy".

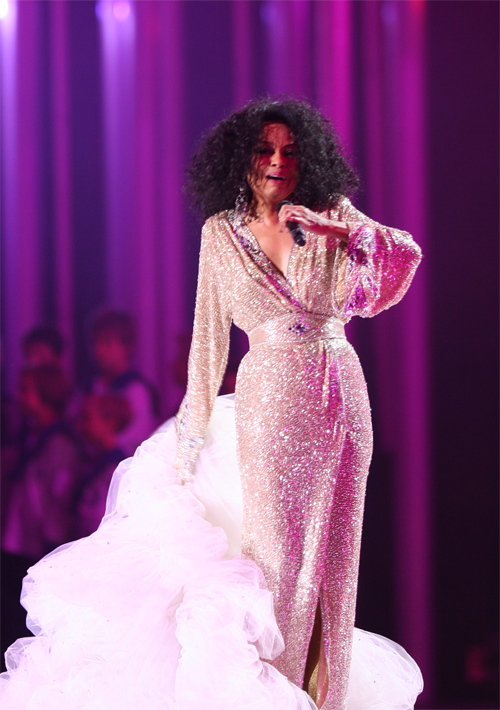
Diana Ross originally performed "Chain Reaction".

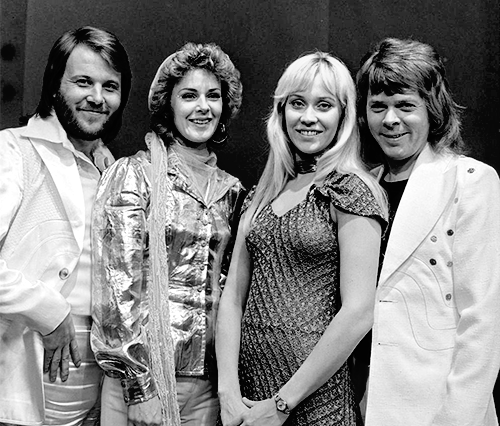
Steps have covered numerous songs performed by ABBA, including "Dancing Queen" and "Lay All Your Love on Me".

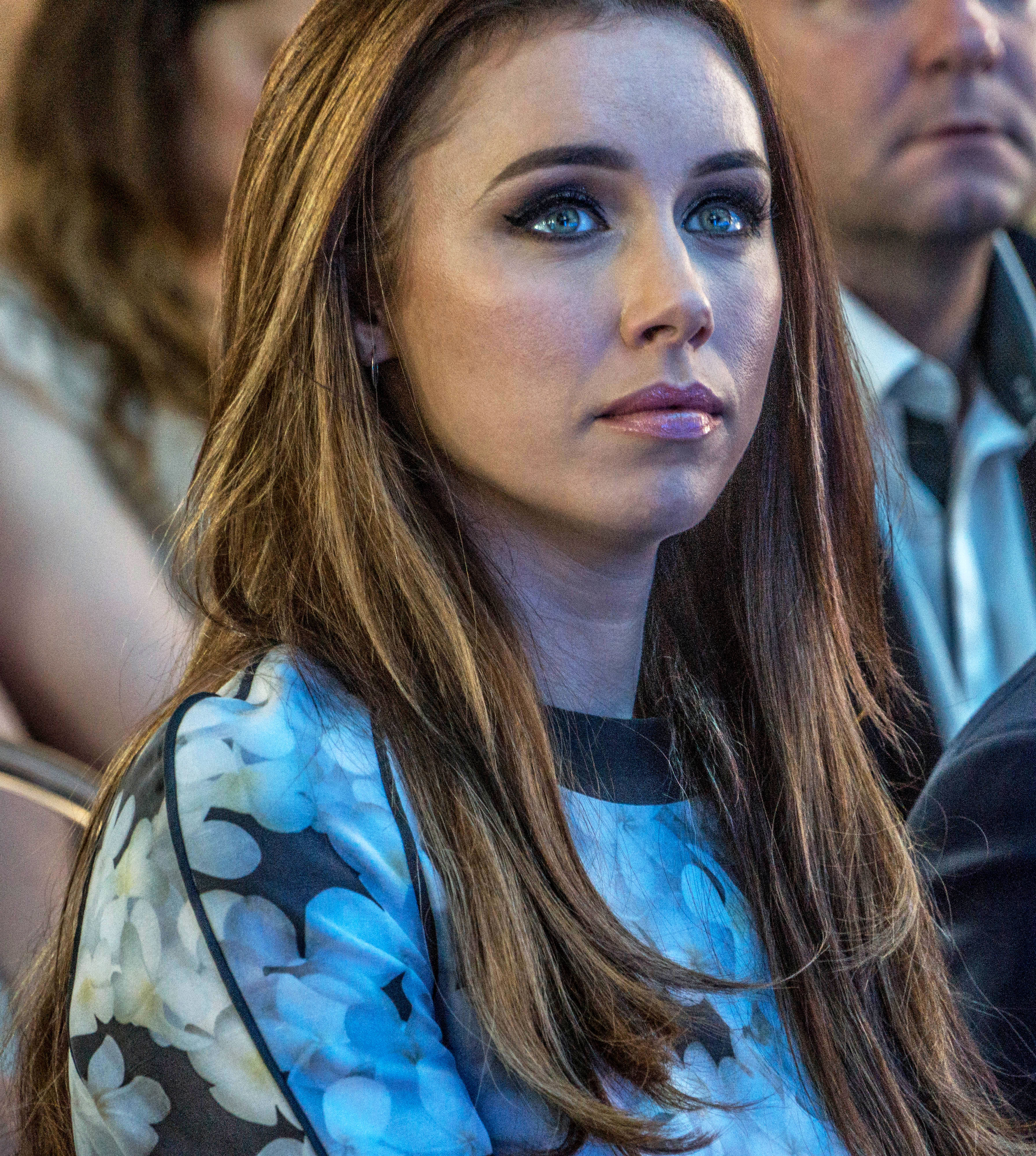
The Saturdays band member Una Healy co-wrote "Dear Santa"

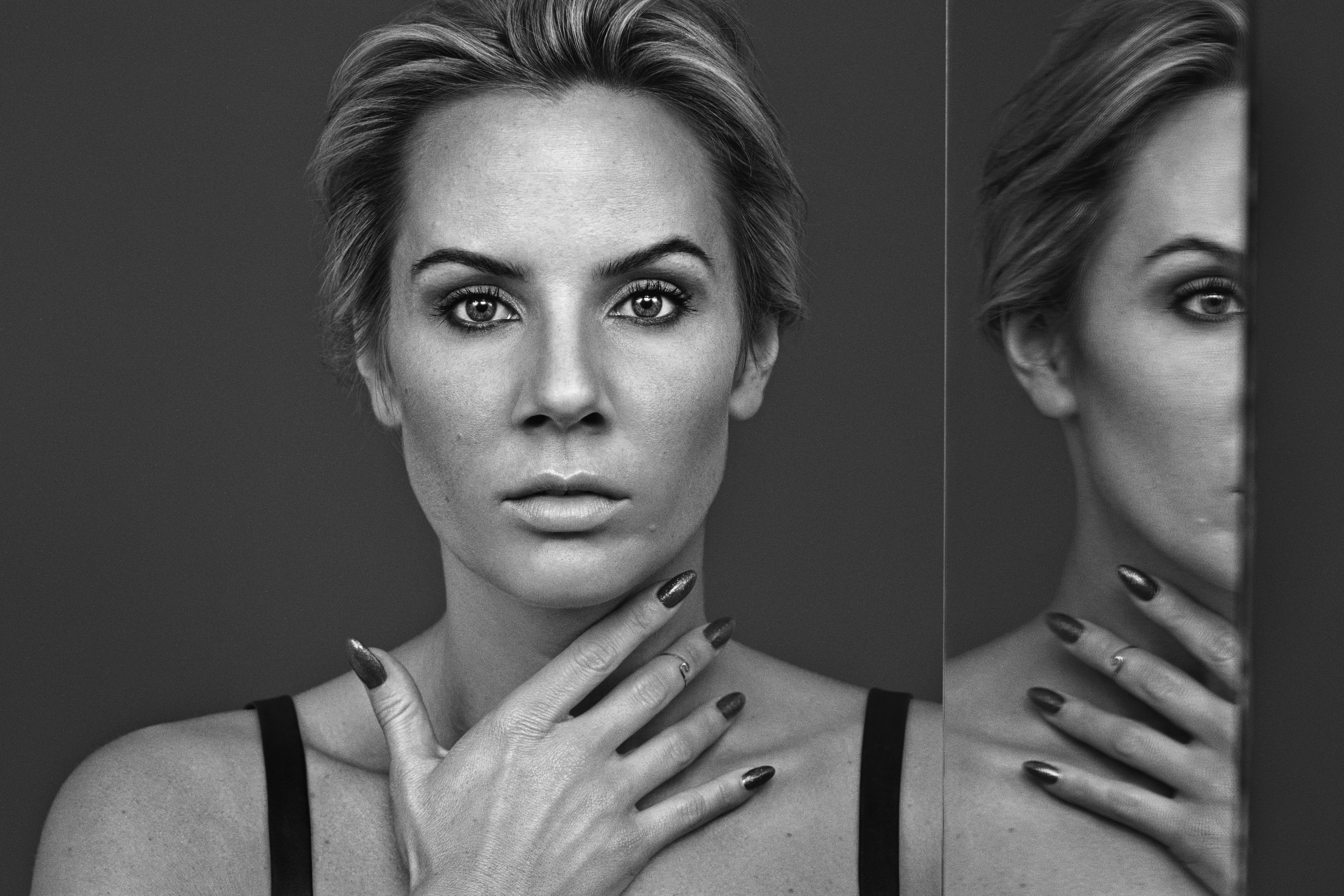
Ina Wroldsen co-wrote "Firefly", "Happy" and "You Make Me Whole" for Tears on the Dancefloor and "Father's Eyes" for What the Future Holds.

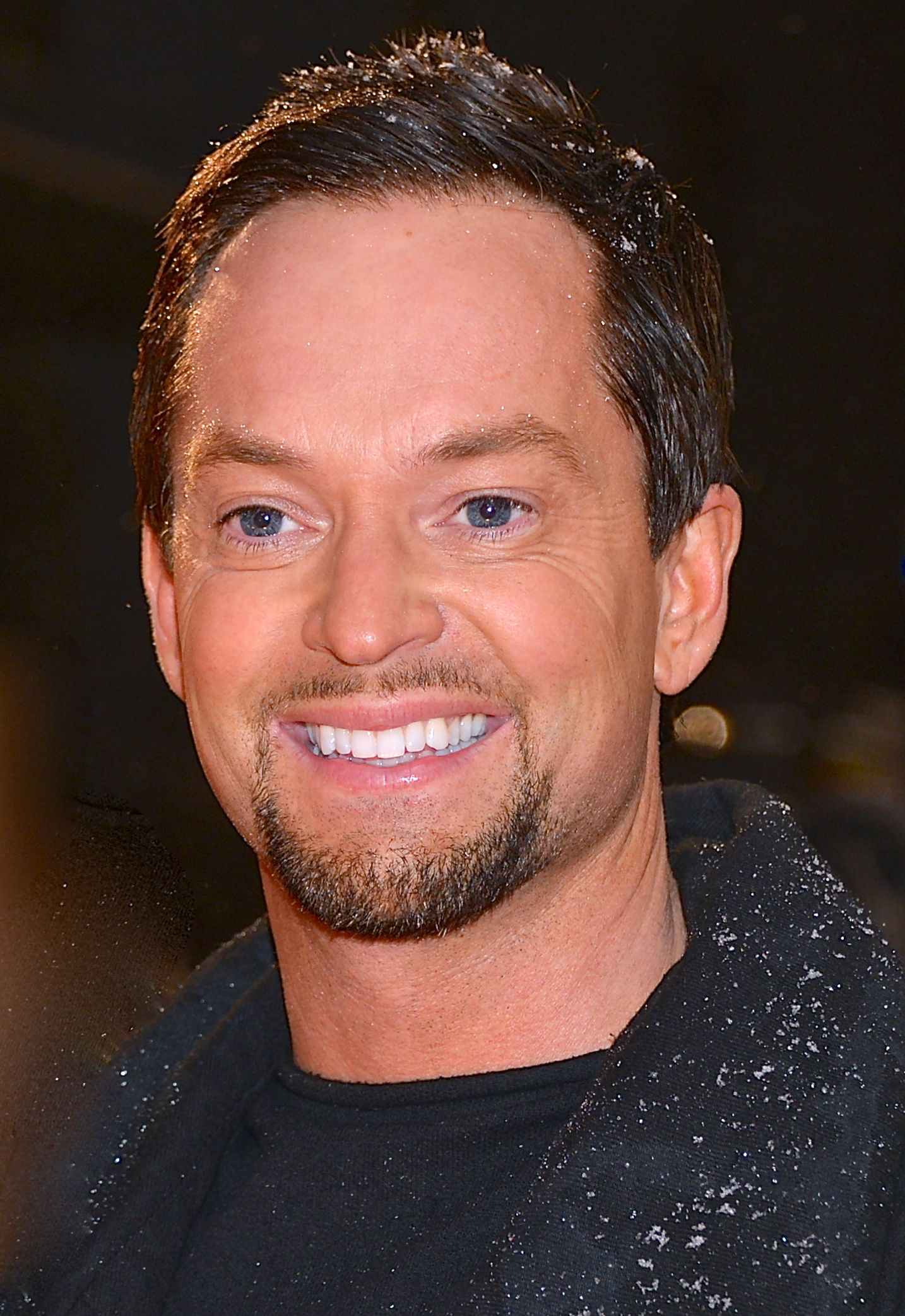
Andreas Carlsson co-wrote "Here and Now" and "Words Are Not Enough".

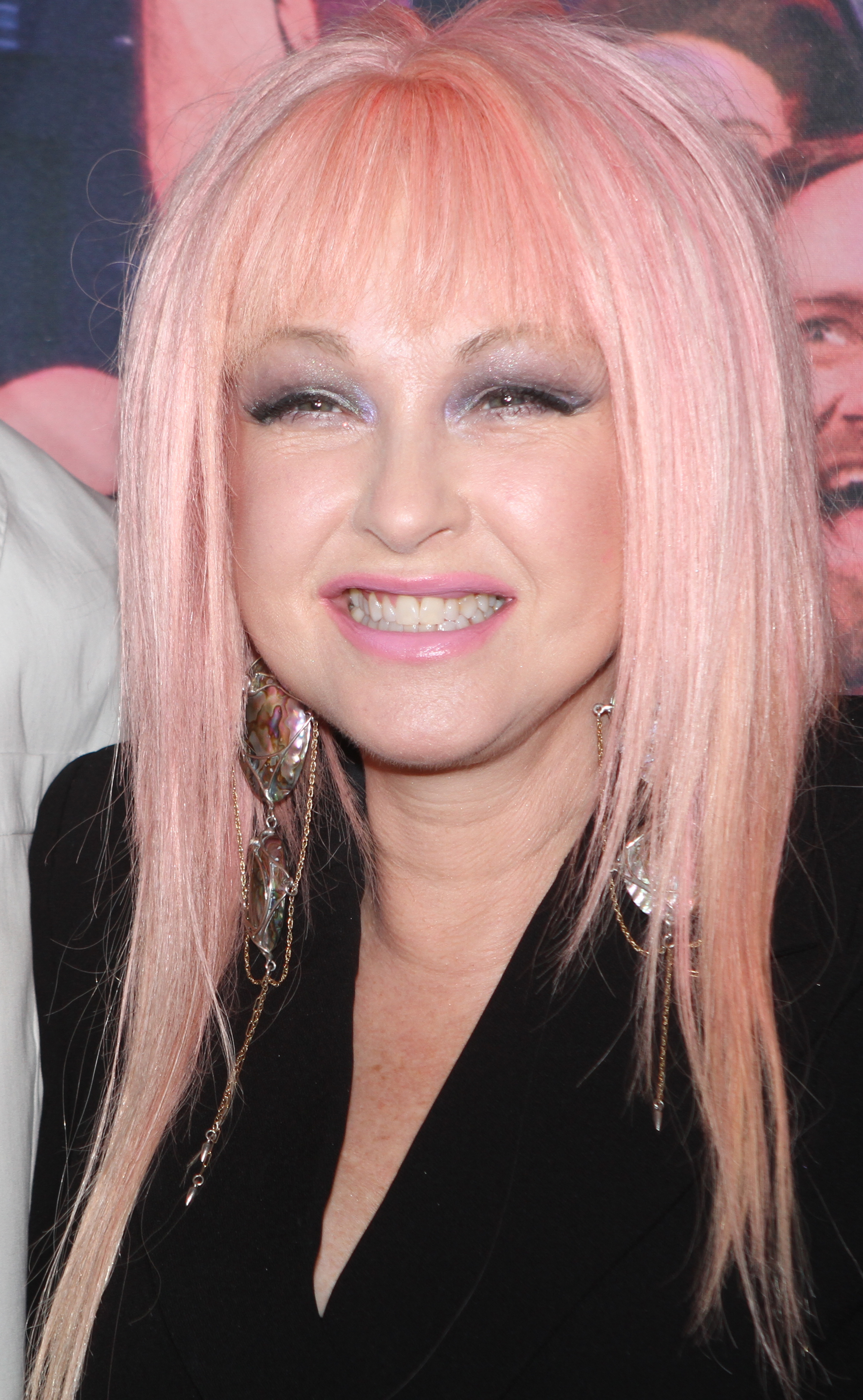
Cyndi Lauper co-wrote "If You Believe" with Steps band member Faye Tozer.

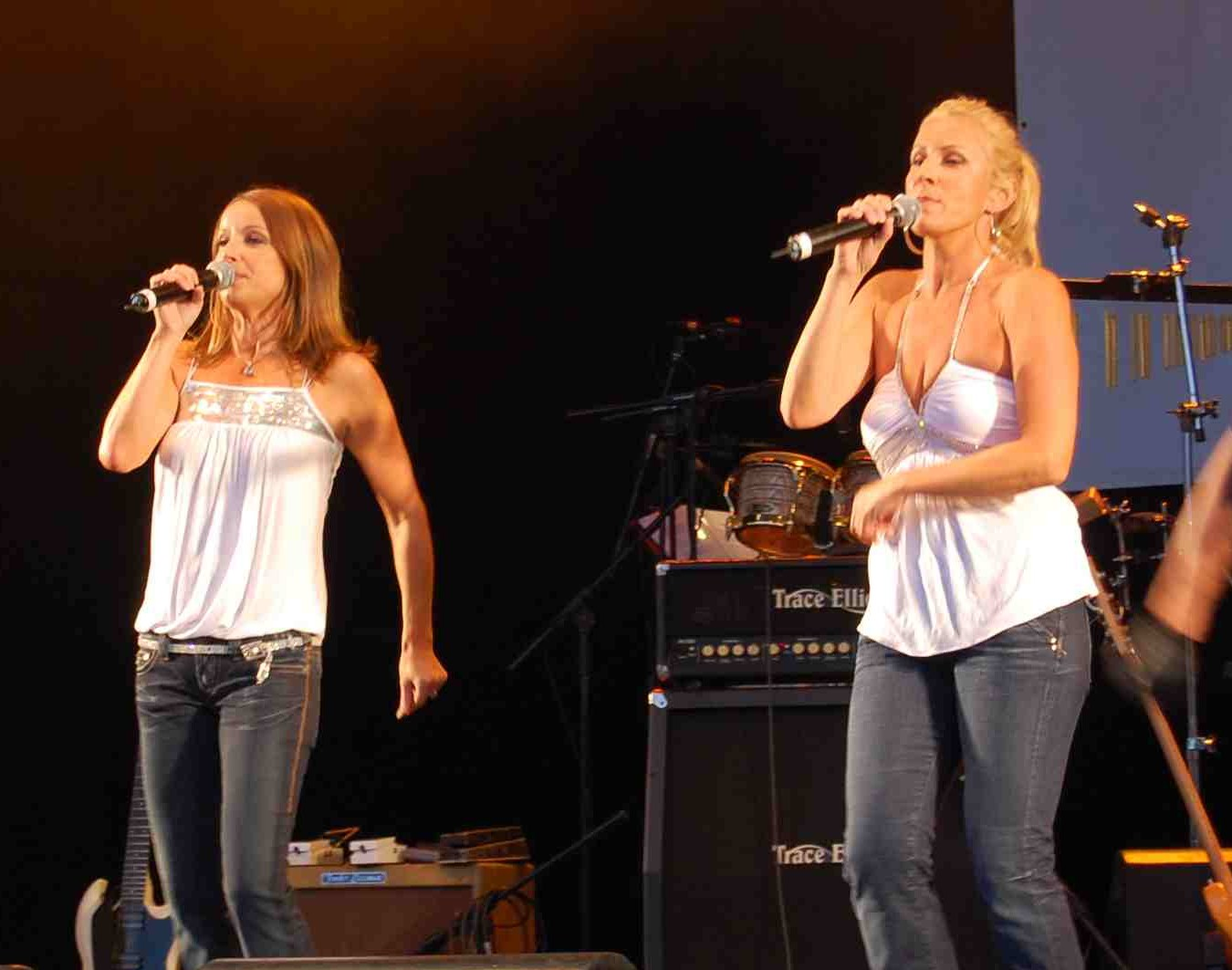
Steps covered "Last Thing on My Mind" and "Movin' On" by Bananarama.

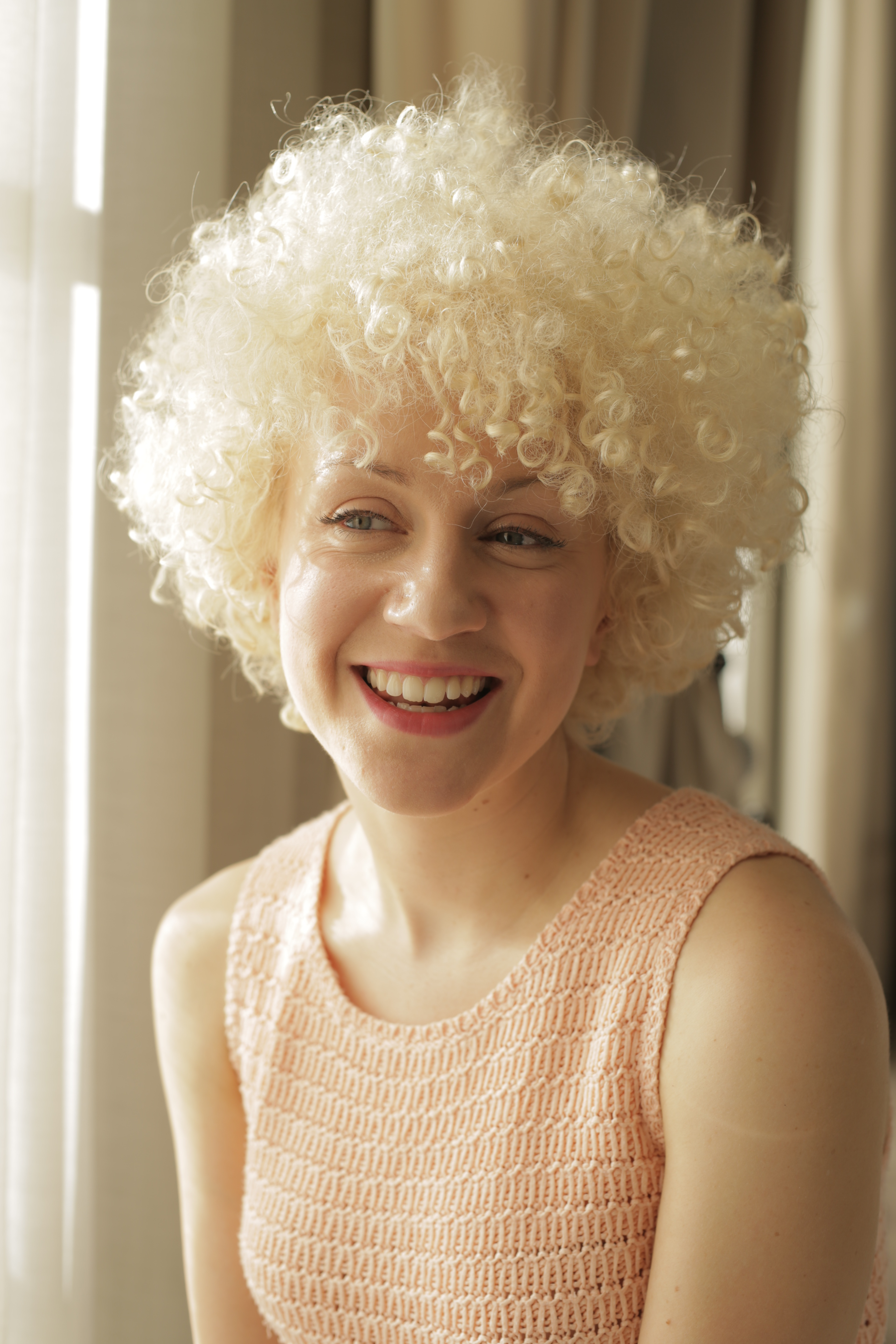
Fiona Bevan (pictured) co-wrote "Come and Dance with Me", "Neon Blue" and "Scared of the Dark" with Carl Ryden.

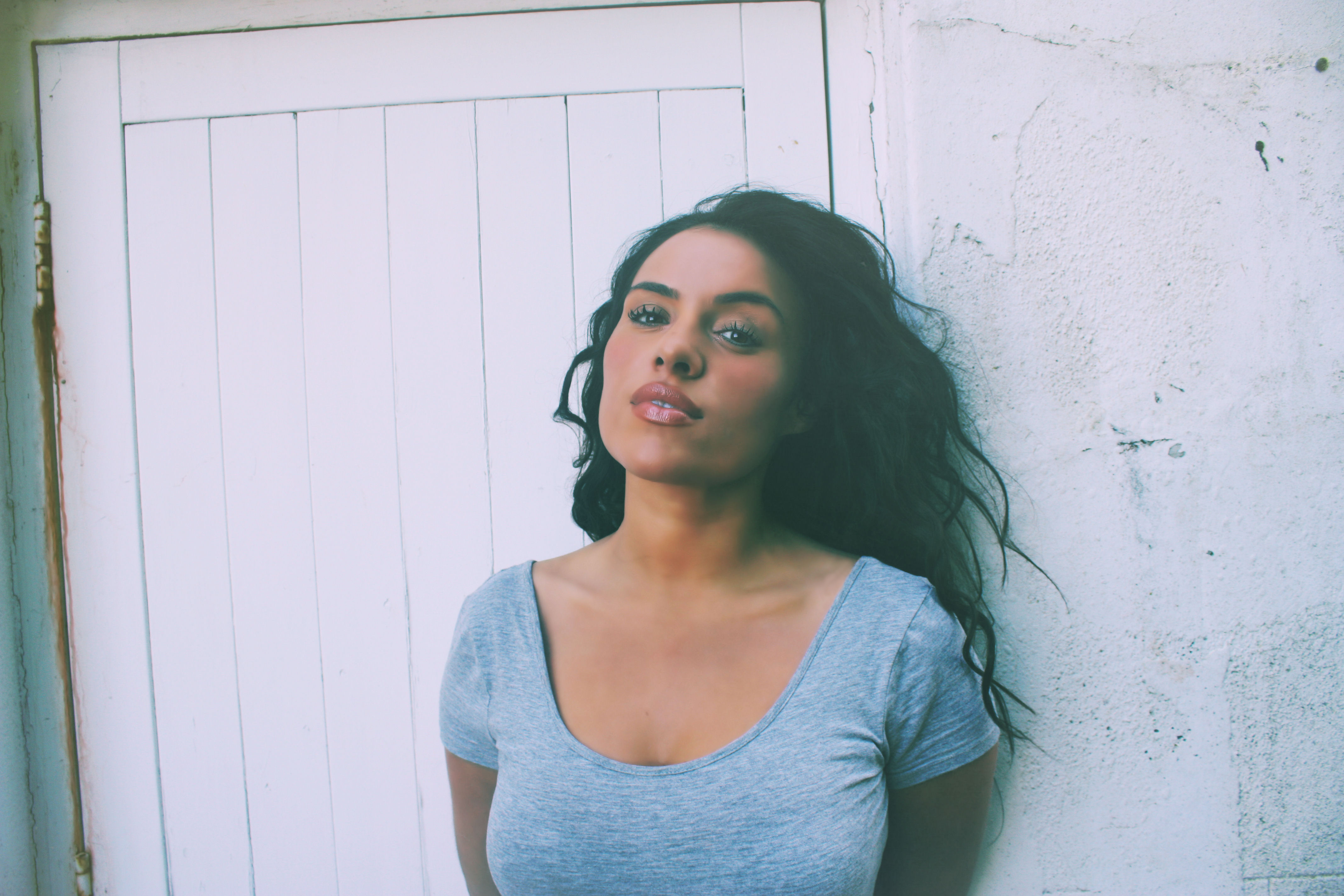
Former contestant of The X Factor Laura White co-wrote "One Touch"

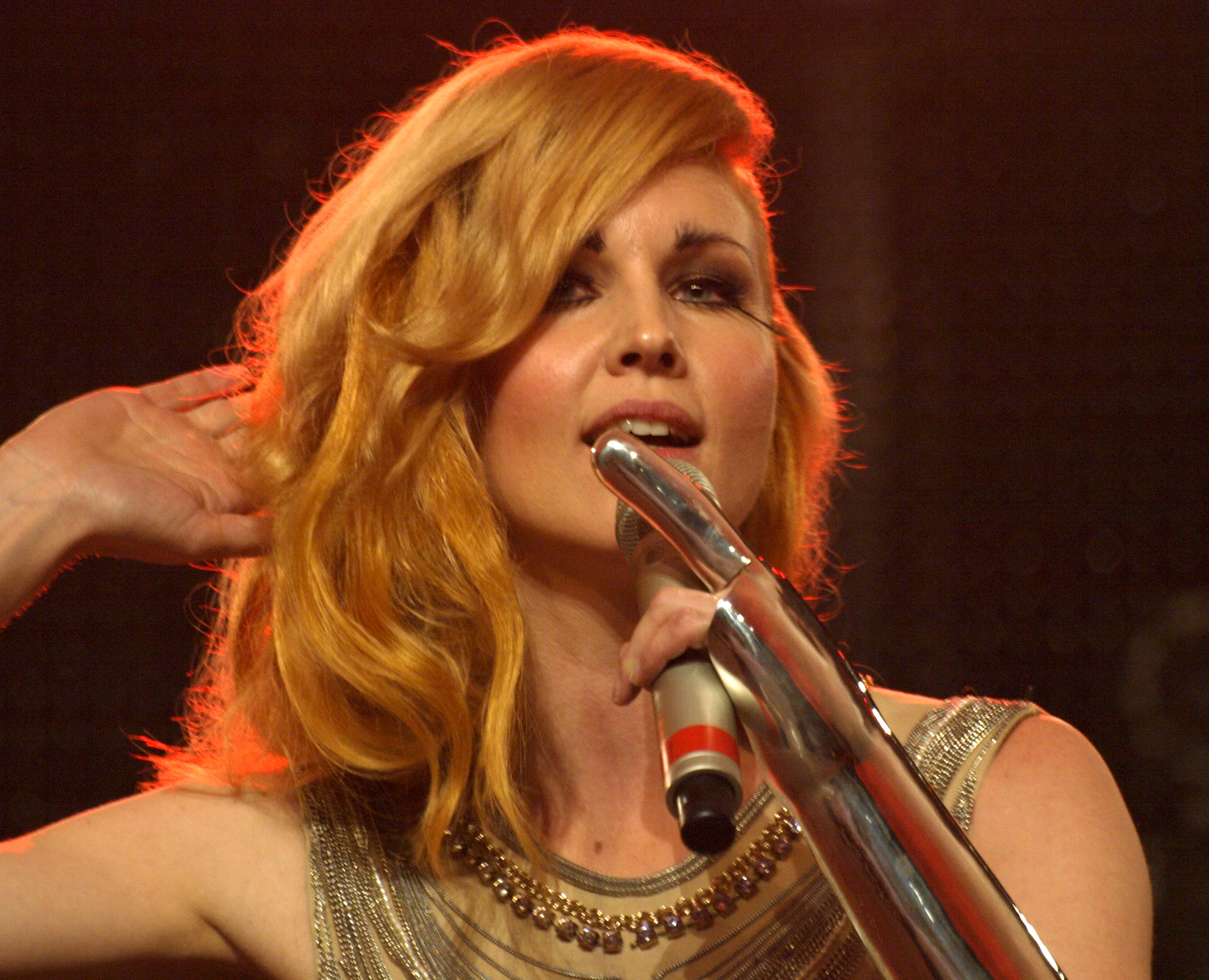
"Something in Your Eyes" is a cover song originally performed by Jenny Silver.

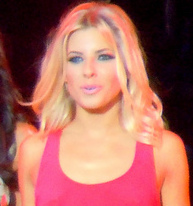
The Saturdays band member Mollie King co-wrote "To the Beat of My Heart".

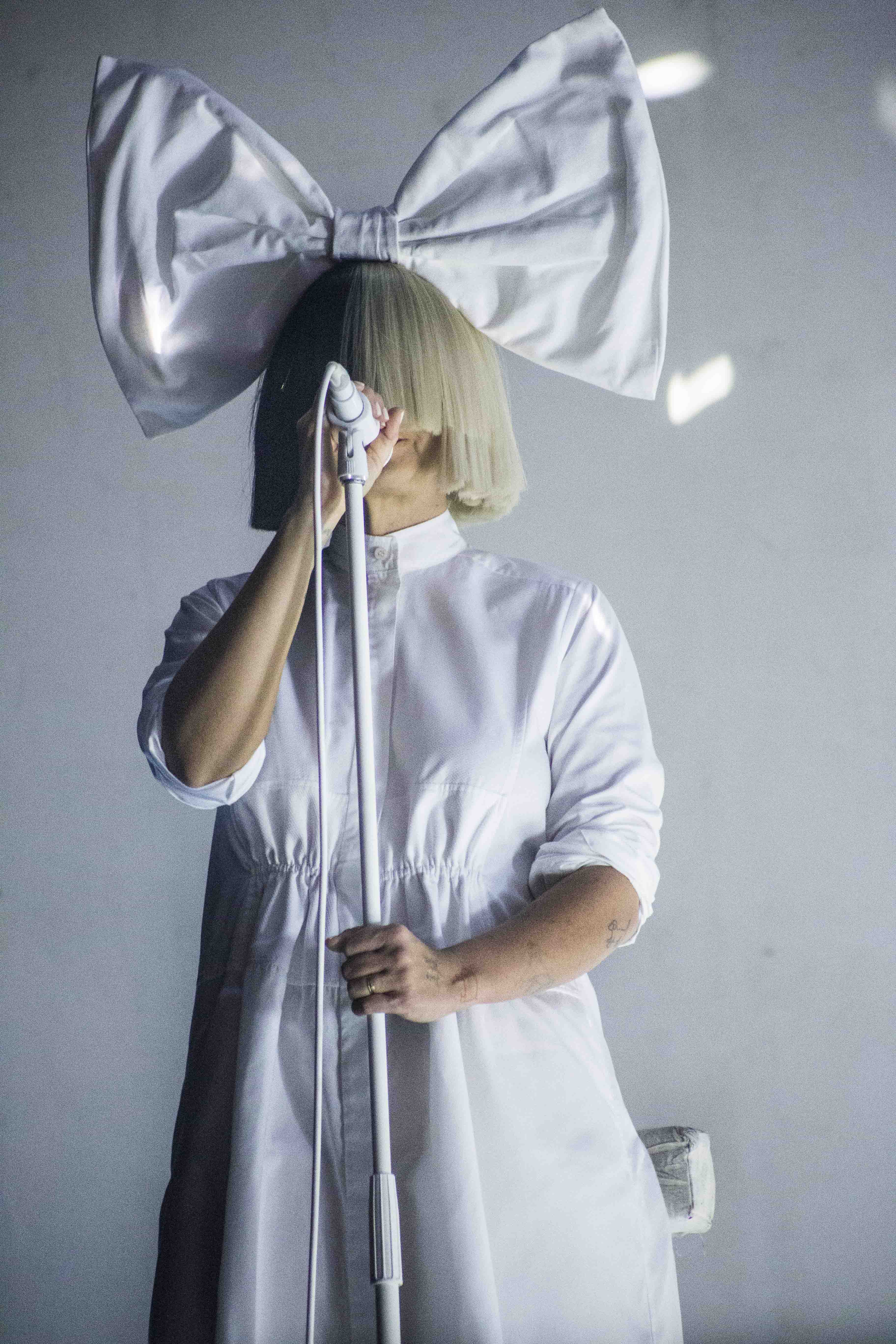
Sia wrote the song "What the Future Holds" specifically for Steps.

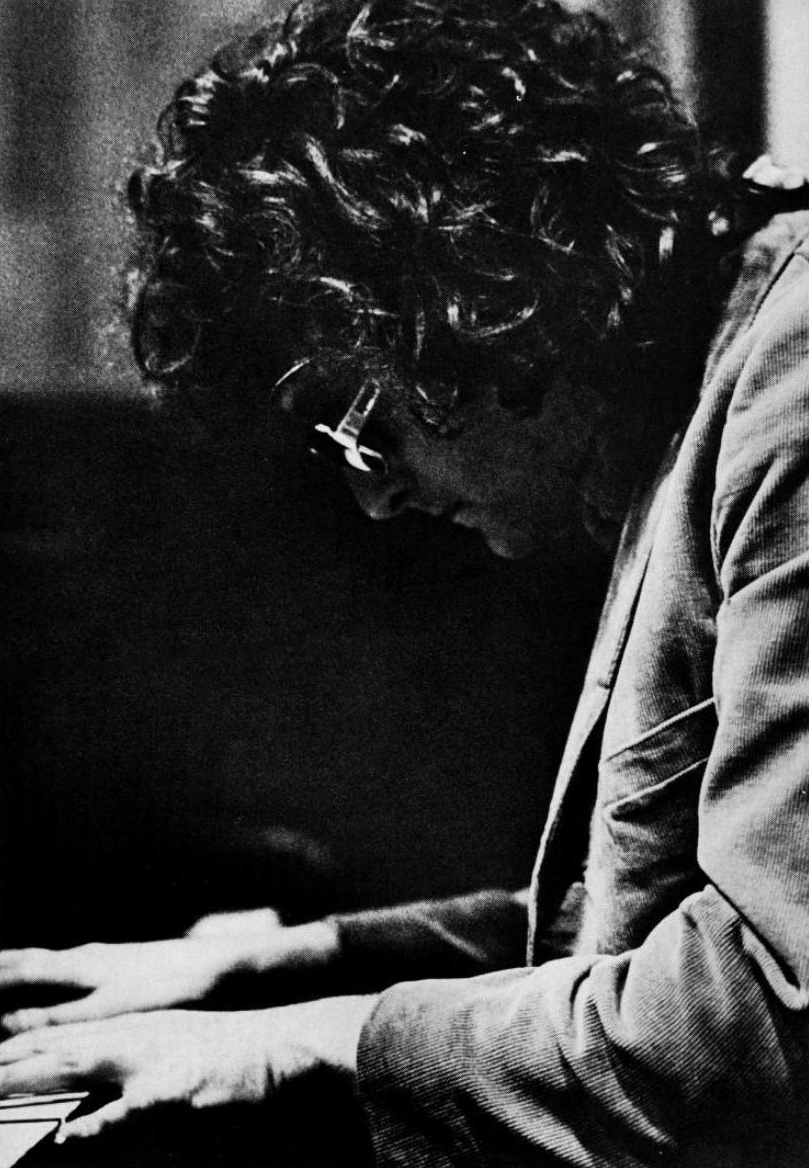
Steps covered "When She Loved Me" written by Randy Newman.

Key
‡	Indicates songs co-written by one or more band member(s)
#	Indicates songs covered by Steps

Name of song, songwriter(s), album or B-side, duration of song and year of release
Song	Songwriter(s)	Album/B-side	Length	Year	Ref.
"5,6,7,8"	Barry Upton; Steve Crosby	Step One	3:22	1998	
"A House Is Not a Home" # (Note: "A House Is Not a Home" is a cover version originally performed by Dionne Warwick.)	Burt Bacharach; Hal David	Light Up the World	3:02	2012	
"A Love to Last"	Barry Upton; Steve Crosby	B-side to "Last Thing on My Mind"	3:42	1998	
"After the Love Has Gone"	Lance Ellington; Karl Twigg; Mark Topham	Steptacular	4:35	1999	
"A Hundred Years of Winter"	Darren Hayes; Walter Afanasieff	What the Future Holds Pt. 2	4:41	2021	
"A Million Years"	G:son; Johanna Jansson; Peter Boström	What the Future Holds Pt. 2	3:03	2021	
"Baby Don't Dance"	Peter Cunnah; Simon Ellis	Gold: Greatest Hits	3:51	2001	
"Back to You"	Karl Twigg; Mark Topham	Step One	4:04	1998	
"Beautiful Battlefield"	Gordon Pogoda; Gloria Sklerov; David Chamberlin	Tears on the Dancefloor: Crying at the Disco	3:21	2017	
"Better Best Forgotten"	Andrew Frampton; Pete Waterman	Step One	3:46	1998	
"Better the Devil You Know" # (Note: "Better the Devil You Know" is a cover version originally performed by Kylie Minogue.)	Mike Stock; Matt Aitken; Pete Waterman	Buzz	3:48	2000	
"Bittersweet" ‡	Lisa Scott-Lee; Jon Cohen; Deni Lew	B-side to "Words Are Not Enough/I Know Him So Well"	3:58	2001	
"Buzzz"	Andy Goldmark; Mark Mueller	Buzz	3:21	2000	
"Chain Reaction" # (Note: "Chain Reaction" is a cover version originally performed by Diana Ross.)	Barry, Robin & Maurice Gibb	Gold: Greatest Hits	3:56	2001	
"Christmas (Baby Please Come Home)" (Ian "H" Watkins solo)	Jeff Barry; Ellie Greenwich; Phil Spector	Light Up the World	3:04	2012	
"Clouds"	Emma Rohan; Grace Barker; Jez Ashurst	What the Future Holds	3:55	2020	
"Come and Dance with Me"	Carl Ryden; Fiona Bevan	What the Future Holds	3:45	2020	
"Dancing Queen" # (Note: "Dancing Queen" is a cover version originally performed by ABBA.)	Benny Andersson; Björn Ulvaeus; Stig Anderson	The Ultimate Collection	3:45	2011	
"Dancing with a Broken Heart" # (Note: "Dancing with a Broken Heart" is a cover version originally performed by Delta Goodrem.)	Delta Goodrem; Vince Pizzinga; John Shanks	Tears on the Dancefloor: Crying at the Disco	3:29	2017	
"Dear Santa"	Barry Stone; Julian Gingell; Una Healy	Tears on the Dancefloor: Crying at the Disco	3:03	2017	
"Deeper Shade of Blue"	Karl Twigg; Mark Topham	Steptacular	4:16	1999	
"Don't Leave us Halfway"	Christian Fast; Märta Grauers; Tania Doko	What the Future Holds	3:11	2020	
"Experienced" (Ian "H" Watkins solo)	Andrew Frampton; Pete Waterman	Step One	3:27	1998	
"Father's Eyes"	Arnthor Birgisson; Ina Wroldsen	What the Future Holds	3:52	2020	
"Firefly"	Steve Mac; Ina Wroldsen	Tears on the Dancefloor	3:26	2017	
"Fool for You"	Carl Ryden; Fiona Bevan	Tears on the Dancefloor: Crying at the Disco	3:31	2017	
"Glitter & Gold"	Barry Stone; Julian Gingell	Tears on the Dancefloor	3:36	2017	
"Hand on Your Heart" ‡	Andrew Frampton; Claire Richards	Buzz	4:03	2000	
"Happy"	Steve Mac; Ina Wroldsen	Tears on the Dancefloor	3:37	2017	
"Happy Go Lucky"	Andy Goldmark; Brad Daymond; Alex Greggs	Buzz	3:33	2000	
"Have Yourself a Merry Little Christmas" # (Note: "Have Yourself a Merry Little Christmas" is a cover version originally performed by Judy Garland.)	Hugh Martin; Ralph Blane	Light Up the World	4:16	2012	
"Hard 2 Forget" # (Note: "Hard 2 Forget" is a cover version originally performed by Vincint.)	Vincint Cannady; James Abrahart	Platinum Collection (Steps album)	3:29	2022	
"Heartbeat"	Jackie James	Step One	4:24	1998	
"Heartbreak in This City"	Karl Twigg; Stella Attar	What the Future Holds	3:27	2020	
"Here and Now" # (Note: "Here and Now" is a cover version originally performed by Worlds Apart.)	Andreas Carlsson; Ali Thomson	Buzz	3:45	2000	
"High"	Dan Olsen; Chris Wahle	What the Future Holds Pt. 2	3:36	2021	
"History Is Made at Night" # (Note: "History Is Made at Night" is a cover version originally performed by the Smash cast featuring Megan Hilty and Will Chase.)	Marc Shaiman; Scott Wittman	Light Up the World	4:12	2012	
"Hold My Heart"	Isa Molin; Robin Stjernberg	What the Future Holds	3:47	2020	
"Human Touch"	Karl Twigg; Mark Topham	Buzz	4:00	2000	
"I Know Him So Well" # (Note: "I Know Him So Well" is a cover version originally performed by Elaine Paige and Barbara Dickson.)	Benny Andersson; Tim Rice; Björn Ulvaeus	ABBAmania	4:14	1999	
"I Surrender"	Karl Twigg; Mark Topham	Steptacular	3:42	1999	
"I Think It's Love" (Claire Richards solo)	Lance Ellington; Karl Twigg; Mark Topham	Steptacular	4:27	1999	
"I Will Love Again" # (Note: "I Will Love Again" is a cover version originally performed by Lara Fabian.)	Mark Taylor; Paul Barry	Tears on the Dancefloor	3:26	2017	
"If You Believe" ‡	Faye Tozer; Cyndi Lauper; Jan Pulsford; Jasper Irn	Buzz	3:52	2000	
"In It For Love" ‡	Andrew Frampton; Claire Richards	B-side to "It's the Way You Make Me Feel"	3:23	2000	
"It May Be Winter Outside" # (Note: "It May Be Winter Outside" is a cover version originally performed by Felice Taylor.)	Barry White; Paul Politi	Light Up the World	3:04	2012	
"It's the Way You Make Me Feel"	Jörgen Elofsson	Buzz	3:17	2000	
"Just Like the First Time"	Andrew Frampton; Pete Waterman	Steptacular	3:28	1999	
"Kiss of Life"	Sara Ann Mathes; Bendik Møller; Charlie Bryce Wallace	What the Future Holds Pt. 2	3:01	2021	
"Last Thing on My Mind" # (Note: "Last Thing on My Mind" is a cover version originally performed by Bananarama.)	Keren Woodward; Mike Stock; Pete Waterman; Sara Dallin	Step One	3:04	1998	
"Lay All Your Love on Me" # (Note: "Lay All Your Love on Me" is a cover version originally performed by ABBA.)	Benny Andersson; Björn Ulvaeus	ABBAmania	4:26	1999	
"Learn to Love Again" ‡	Andrew Frampton; Ian "H" Watkins	Buzz	3:27	2000	
"Light Up the World"	Karl Twigg; Yamit Mamo	Light Up the World	4:56	2012	
"Living in a Lie"	Thomas G:son; Henrik Sethsson	What the Future Holds Pt. 2	3:03	2021	
"Love U More" # (Note: "Love U More" is a cover version originally performed by Sunscreem.)	Lucia Holm; Paul Cannell	Step One	3:38	1998	
"Love's Got a Hold on My Heart"	Andrew Frampton; Pete Waterman	Steptacular	3:19	1999	
"Mars & Venus (We Fall in Love Again)"	Dane DeViller; Sean Hosein; Jörgen Elofsson; Andy Goldmark	Buzz	3:50	2000	
"Make It Easy on Me" (Lisa Scott-Lee solo) # (Note: "Make It Easy on Me" is a cover version originally performed by Sybil.)	Mike Stock; Matt Aitken; Pete Waterman	Steptacular	3:34	1999	
"Merry Xmas Everybody" # (Note: "Merry Xmas Everybody" is a cover version originally performed by Slade.)	Noddy Holder; Jim Lea	The Last Dance	3:10	2002	
"Movin' On" # (Note: "Movin' On" is a cover version originally performed by Bananarama.)	Keren Woodward; Mike Stock; Pete Waterman; Sara Dallin	Steptacular	3:29	1999	
"My Best Friend's Girl" (Ian "H" Watkins solo)	Lance Ellington; Karl Twigg; Mark Topham	Steptacular	3:40	1999	
"Neon Blue"	Carl Ryden; Fiona Bevan	Tears on the Dancefloor	3:26	2017	
"Never Get Over You" ‡	Lisa Scott-Lee; Ray Hedges; Nigel Butler	Buzz	3:55	2000	
"Never Say Never Again"	Andrew Frampton; Pete Waterman	Steptacular	3:51	1999	
"No More Tears on the Dancefloor" # (Note: "No More Tears on the Dancefloor" is a cover version originally performed by Anders|Fahrenkrog.)	Carl Falk; Darren Hayes	Tears on the Dancefloor	3:37	2017	
"One for Sorrow"	Lance Ellington; Karl Twigg; Mark Topham	Step One	4:20	1998	
"One Less Bell to Answer" # (Note: "One Less Bell to Answer" is a cover version originally performed by The 5th Dimension.)	Burt Bacharach; Hal David	Light Up the World	4:56	2012	
"One Touch"	Chris Wahle; Laura White; Neil Treppas	What the Future Holds	3:51	2020	
"Only in My Dreams" ‡	Lee Latchford-Evans; Claire Richards; Lisa Scott-Lee; Faye Tozer; Ian "H" Watkins; Andrew Frampton	Gold: Greatest Hits	4:17	2001	
"Overjoyed" # (Note: "Overjoyed" is a cover version originally performed by Stevie Wonder.)	Stevie Wonder	Light Up the World	3:40	2012	
"Paradise Lost"	Karl Twigg; Mark Topham	Buzz	4:35	2000	
"Please Come Home for Christmas" (Lee Latchford-Evans solo) # (Note: "Please Come Home for Christmas" is a cover version originally performed by Charles Brown.)	Charles Brown; Gene Redd	Light Up the World	2:47	2012	
"Say You'll Be Mine"	Andrew Frampton; Pete Waterman	Steptacular	3:31	1999	
"Scared of the Dark"	Carl Ryden; Fiona Bevan	Tears on the Dancefloor	3:46	2017	
"Scared of the Dark" (Acoustic)	Carl Ryden; Fiona Bevan	Tears on the Dancefloor: Crying at the Disco	4:01	2017	
"September Sun"	Barry Stone; Julian Gingell	Tears on the Dancefloor: Crying at the Disco	4:19	2017	
"Since You Took Your Love Away" (Faye Tozer solo)	Andrew Frampton; Pete Waterman	Steptacular	4:35	1999	
"Something in Your Eyes" # (Note: "Something in Your Eyes" is a cover version originally performed by Jenny Silver.)	Erik Bernholm; Thomas G:son; Henrik Sethsson	What the Future Holds	3:02	2020	
"Space Between Us"	Barry Stone; Julian Gingell	Tears on the Dancefloor	4:16	2017	
"Stay with Me"	Craig Joiner; Robert John Lange; Anthony Mitman	Step One	3:50	1998	
"Steptro" # (Note: "Steptro" is a fifty-six second introduction that leads into "Last Thing on My Mind".)	Keren Woodward; Mike Stock; Pete Waterman; Sara Dallin	Step One	0:56	1998	
"Stomp" # (Note: "Stomp" is listed as being 'A Tribute to Bernard Edwards/Nile Rodgers' in the liner notes of Buzz, and samples "Everybody Dance by Chic.)	Karl Twigg; Mark Topham; Rita Campbell	Buzz	3:21	2000	
"Stop Me From Loving You" ‡	Claire Richards; Ian "H" Watkins; Steve Anderson	B-side to "Chain Reaction"	3:22	2001	
"Story of a Heart" # (Note: "Story of a Heart" is a cover version originally performed by the Benny Anderssons orkester featuring Helen Sjöholm.)	Benny Andersson; Björn Ulvaeus	Tears on the Dancefloor	4:16	2017	
"Summer of Love"	Karl Twigg; Mark Topham	Buzz	3:52	2000	
"Take Me for a Ride"	Mark Topham; Karl Twigg	What the Future Holds Pt. 2	3:44	2021	
"The Runner" # (Note: "The Runner" is a cover version originally performed by pop group The Three Degrees.)	Giorgio Moroder; Sheila Ferguson	Platinum Collection (Steps album)	3:20	2022	
"The Slightest Touch" # (Note: "The Slightest Touch" is a cover version originally performed by pop group Five Star.)	Michael Jay; Marvin Morrow	What the Future Holds Pt. 2	3:27	2021	
"This Heart Will Love Again"	Andrew Frampton; Pete Waterman	Step One	3:48	1998	
"Thank ABBA for the Music" # (Note: "Thank ABBA for the Music" is a medley of cover versions originally performed by ABBA.)	Benny Andersson; Björn Ulvaeus; Stig Anderson	ABBAmania	4:26	1999	
"To Be Your Hero"	Lance Ellington; Karl Twigg; Mark Topham	B-side to "Love's Got a Hold on My Heart"	3:40	1999	
"To the Beat of My Heart"	Sarah Thompson; Uzoechi Emenike; Annie Yuill; Benjamin Taylor; Brian Higgins; Keir MacCulloch; Kyle Mackenzie; Lee Voss; Matthew Grey; Miranda Cooper; Mollie King	What the Future Holds	3:10	2020	
"To the One"	Hannah Robinson; Barry Stone; Julian Gingell	What the Future Holds	3:55	2020	
"Too Busy Thinking About My Baby" # (Note: "Too Busy Thinking About My Baby" is a cover version originally performed by The Temptations.)	Norman Whitfield; Barrett Strong; Janie Bradford	B-side to "It's the Way You Make Me Feel"	2:49	2000	
"Too Weak to Resist" (Ian "H" Watkins solo)	Andrew Frampton; Pete Waterman	Step One	3:50	1998	
"Tragedy" # (Note: "Tragedy" is a cover version originally performed by the Bee Gees.)	Barry, Robin & Maurice Gibb	Steptacular	4:31	1999	
"Trouble & Love"	Fiona Bevan; Carl Ryden	What the Future Holds Pt. 2	3:05	2021	
"Turn Around" ‡	Lee Latchford-Evans; Michael Garvin; Oskar Paul	Buzz	3:24	2000	
"Under My Skin"	Charlie Walshe; Farley Arvidsson; Rachel Furner	What the Future Holds	3:31	2020	
"Victorious" # (Note: "Victorious" is a cover version originally performed by Lina Hedlund.)	Jansson; Richard Edwards; Dino Medanhodzic; Melanie Wehbe	What the Future Holds Pt. 2	3:01	2021	
"Voulez-Vous" # (Note: "Voulez-Vous" is a cover version originally performed by ABBA.)	Benny Andersson; Björn Ulvaeus	Summer of Steps Tour	—N/a	2018	
"Wasted Tears"	Christian Fast; Märta Grauers; Malin Johansson	What the Future Holds Pt. 2	3:40	2021	
"What the Future Holds"	Greg Kurstin; Sia Furler	What the Future Holds	4:27	2020	
"When I Said Goodbye"	Karl Twigg; Mark Topham	Steptacular	3:30	1999	
"When She Loved Me" # (Note: "When She Loved Me" is a cover version originally performed by Sarah McLachlan.)	Randy Newman	Light Up the World	3:21	2012	
"Why?"	Karl Twigg; Mark Topham	B-side to "Better Best Forgotten"	4:08	1998	
"Words Are Not Enough"	Andreas Carlsson; Pelle Nylén	Gold: Greatest Hits	3:24	2001	
"Words of Wisdom"	Barry Upton; Steve Crosby	B-side to "5,6,7,8"	3:52	1997	
"Wouldn't Hurt So Bad"	Andy Goldmark; Mark Mueller	Buzz	3:34	2000	
"You Make Me Whole" # (Note: "You Make Me Whole" is a cover version originally performed by Aneta Sablik.)	Ina Wroldsen; Wayne Hector; Ben Kohn, Tom Barnes & Pete Kelleher	Tears on the Dancefloor	3:42	2017	
"You'll Be Sorry"	Karl Twigg; Mark Topham	Buzz	4:06	2000	
"You're Everything That Matters to Me"	Jackie James	Steptacular	4:23	1999	
