= Platinum Collection (Steps album) =

Greatest hits album by Steps
- Released: 19 August 2022
- Recorded: 1997–2022
- Genre: Pop
- Label: Sony

Steps chronology
What the Future Holds Pt. 2 (2021)	Platinum Collection (2022)

Singles from Platinum Collection
- 1. "Hard 2 Forget" Released: 7 July 2022

Platinum Collection is the third greatest hits album released by pop group Steps. The album was released on 19 August 2022 through Sony Music Entertainment. The album is to mark the twenty fifth anniversary of the group's formation back in 1997. The album features Steps' greatest hits along with two brand new songs; "Hard 2 Forget", and "The Runner".

== Background and promotion ==
On June 1, 2022, Steps announced they would be releasing their third greatest hits album “Platinum Collection” to celebrate 25 years in the music industry and since their formation in 1997. Following the announcement of the upcoming release, group members Lisa Scott-Lee, and Faye Tozer, were interviewed with Official Charts Company. Both Scott-Lee and Tozer expressed their happiness with the 25th anniversary of the group, stating “It’s nice for us to spread a little happiness. I think Steps add a certain sparkle to the world.” Also stating “This anniversary marks the perfect moment to take a look back at everything we’ve achieved as a band. We realised that we’ve released a full 3 new studio albums since our last Greatest Hits so it felt like time to combine all our hits on one package. We’ve recorded two brand-new tracks for the album and hay presto, the Platinum Collection was born. It was such good fun listening back at 25 years of our songs and we hope you enjoy this trip down memory lane as much we did.”

== Singles ==
The group appeared on BBC1's The One Show on the same day to promote the release of the album and the "Platinum Megamix" single that was released on the same day of the announcement.

On 7 July 2022, Steps released the first official single from the compilation, "Hard 2 Forget", a cover of the 2020 Vincint song. The official music video premiered at 2pm BST on the same day. After less than 24 hours of release, the single debuted at 21 on the UK Official Singles Downloads Top 100 Chart on 8 July 2022.

== Chart performance ==
On 26 August, the album entered the UK Album Chart at number one with sales of 24,123 copies.

== Track listing ==
Standard edition
No.	Title	Writer(s)	Length
1.	"Scared of the Dark" (from Tears on the Dancefloor)	Carl Ryden; Fiona Bevan
2.	"Deeper Shade of Blue" (from Steptacular)	Mark Topham; Karl Twigg
3.	"One for Sorrow" (from Step One)	Topham; Twigg; Lance Ellington
4.	"Heartbreak in This City" (with Michelle Visage; from What the Future Holds Pt. 2)	Stella Attar; Twigg
5.	"Tragedy" (from Steptacular)	Barry Gibb; Robin Gibb; Maurice Gibb
6.	"Love's Got a Hold on My Heart" (from Steptacular)	Andrew Frampton; Pete Waterman
7.	"What the Future Holds" (from What the Future Holds)	Greg Kurstin; Sia Furler
8.	"Last Thing on My Mind" (from Step One)	Mike Stock; Waterman; Sara Dallin; Keren Woodward
9.	"It's the Way You Make Me Feel" (from Buzz)	Jörgen Elofsson
10.	"Stomp" (from Buzz)	Topham; Twigg; Rita Campbell; Bernard Edwards; Nile Rodgers
11.	"Something in Your Eyes" (from What the Future Holds)	Erik Bernholm; Henrik Sethsson; G:son
12.	"Chain Reaction" (from Gold: Greatest Hits)	Barry Gibb; Robin Gibb; Maurice Gibb
13.	"Story of a Heart" (from Tears on the Dancefloor)	Benny Andersson; Björn Ulvaeus
14.	"Summer of Love" (from Buzz)	Topham; Twigg
15.	"5, 6, 7, 8" (from Step One)	Barry Upton; Steve Crosby
16.	"Better the Devil You Know" (from Buzz)	Stock; Matt Aitken; Waterman
17.	"Neon Blue" (from Tears on the Dancefloor)	Ryden; Bevan; Scott Gausden
18.	"Better Best Forgotten" (from Step One)	Frampton; Waterman
19.	"Heartbeat" (from Step One)	Jackie James
20.	"Hard 2 Forget"	Vincint Cannady; James Abrahart
21.	"The Runner" (Cover of The Three Degrees single)	Giorgio Moroder; Sheila Ferguson

Digital and deluxe
No.	Title	Writer(s)	Length
1.	"Here and Now" (Soundtrade Mix; from Buzz)	Andreas Carlsson; Ali Thomson
2.	"The Slightest Touch" (from What the Future Holds Pt. 2)	Michael Jay; Marvin Morrow
3.	"After the Love Has Gone" (from Steptacular)	Topham; Twigg; Ellington
4.	"Say You'll Be Mine" (from Steptacular)	Frampton; Waterman
5.	"Take Me for a Ride" (single mix; from What the Future Holds Pt. 2)	Topham; Twigg
6.	"Love U More" (from Step One)	Lucia Holm; Paul Cannell
7.	"A Hundred Years of Winter" (F9 Radio Edit; from What the Future Holds Pt. 2)	Darren Hayes; Walter Afanasieff
8.	"Baby Don't Dance" (W.I.P. Radio Edit; from The Last Dance)	Peter Cunnah; Simon Ellis
9.	"Dancing with a Broken Heart" (from Tears on the Dancefloor Crying at the Disco)	Delta Goodrem; Vince Pizzinga; John Shanks
10.	"Paradise Lost" (from Buzz)	Topham; Twigg
11.	"To the Beat of My Heart" (from What the Future Holds)	Sarah Thompson; Uzoechi Emenike; Annie Yuill; Benjamin Taylor; Brian Higgins; Keir MacCulloch; Kyle Mackenzie; Lee Voss; Matthew Grey; Miranda Cooper; Mollie King
12.	"You'll Be Sorry" (The Pardon Mix; from Buzz)	Topham; Twigg
13.	"No More Tears on the Dancefloor" (from Tears on the Dancefloor)	Carl Falk; Hayes
14.	"Words Are Not Enough" (from Gold: Greatest Hits)	Pelle Nylén; Carlsson
15.	"Happy" (from Tears on the Dancefloor)	Ina Wroldsen; Steve Mac
16.	"I Know Him So Well" (from The Last Dance)	Ulvaeus; Andersson; Tim Rice
17.	"Just Like the First Time" (from The Last Dance)	Frampton; Waterman
18.	"When I Said Goodbye" (from Steptacular)	Topham; Twigg
19.	"Deeper Shade of Blue" (Flashbox Remix; unreleased)	Topham; Twigg
20.	"One for Sorrow" (Steps 25 version; unreleased)	Topham; Twigg; Ellington
21.	"Stomp" (Steps 25 version; unreleased)	Topham; Twigg; Campbell; Edwards; Rodgers
22.	"Tragedy" (Steps 25 version; unreleased)	Barry Gibb; Robin Gibb; Maurice Gibb
23.	"Hard 2 Forget" (7th Heaven Remix; unreleased)	Cannady; Abrahart

Claire version
No.	Title	Writer(s)	Length
16.	"I Surrender" (from Steptacular)	Topham; Twigg
17.	"Wasted Tears" (from What the Future Holds Pt. 2)	Christian Fast; Märta Grauers; Malin Johansson
18.	"Hand on Your Heart" (from Buzz)	Claire Richards; Andrew Frampton

Lisa version
No.	Title	Writer(s)	Length
16.	"Never Get Over You" (from Buzz)	Lisa Scott-Lee; Ray "Madman" Hedges; Nigel Butler
17.	"Glitter & Gold" (from Tears on the Dancefloor)	Barry Stone; Julian Gingell
18.	"Bittersweet" (from The Last Dance)	Deni Lew; Jon Cohen; Scott-Lee

Faye version
No.	Title	Writer(s)	Length
16.	"If You Believe" (from Buzz)	Faye Tozer; Cyndi Lauper; Jan Pulsford; Jasper Irn
17.	"You Make Me Whole" (from Tears on the Dancefloor)	Ina Wroldsen; Thomas Barnes; Peter Kelleher; Benjamin Kohn; Wayne Hector
18.	"Since You Took Your Love Away" (from Steptacular)	Frampton; Waterman

H version
No.	Title	Writer(s)	Length
16.	"To the One" (from What the Future Holds)	Hannah Robinson; Stone; Gingell
17.	"Learn to Love Again" (from Buzz)	Ian Watkins; Frampton
18.	"You'll Be Sorry" (W.I.P. Radio Remix; from The Last Dance)	Topham; Twigg

Lee version
No.	Title	Writer(s)	Length
16.	"Clouds" (from What the Future Holds)	Emma Rohan; Grace Barker; Jez Ashurst
17.	"Turn Around" (from Buzz)	Lee Latchford Evans; Michael Garvin; Oskar Paul
18.	"Buzzz" (from Buzz)	Andy Goldmark; Mark Mueller

Pre Party Edition

1. "5, 6, 7, 8"
2. "Better Best Forgotten"
3. "Better the Devil You Know"
4. "Chain Reaction"
5. "Deeper Shade of Blue" (Radio Edit)
6. "Hard 2 Forget"
7. "Heartbeat"
8. "It's the Way You Make Me Feel"
9. "Last Thing on My Mind"
10. "Love's Got a Hold on My Heart"
11. "One for Sorrow"
12. "Stomp"
13. "Summer of Love"
14. "The Runner" (Steps Platinum Version)
15. "Tragedy"
16. "Something in Your Eyes"
17. "What the Future Holds" (Single Mix)
18. "Heartbreak in This City" (Single Mix)
19. "Neon Blue"
20. "Scared of the Dark"
21. "Story of a Heart"
22. "Deeper Shade of Blue" (Steps 25 Revisited Mix)
23. "It’s The Way You Make Me Feel" (Demo)
24. "Here And Now" (FAF Radio Mix)
25. "Tragedy" (WIP Extended Mix)
26. "Heartbeat (Steps 25 Revisited Mix)
27. "Better The Devil You Know" (JRMX Radio Mix)
28. "Only In My Dreams" (Alternate Demo)
29. "A Hundred Years Of Winter" (7th Heaven Radio Mix)
30. "Never Get Over You" (Wembley Tour Mix)
31. "Summer Of Love" (Steps 25 Revisited Mix)

Party Edition

1. "5, 6, 7, 8"
2. "Better Best Forgotten"
3. "Better the Devil You Know"
4. "Chain Reaction"
5. "Deeper Shade of Blue" (Radio Edit)
6. "Hard 2 Forget"
7. "Heartbeat"
8. "It's the Way You Make Me Feel"
9. "Last Thing on My Mind"
10. "Love's Got a Hold on My Heart"
11. "One for Sorrow"
12. "Stomp"
13. "Summer of Love"
14. "The Runner" (Steps Platinum Version)
15. "Tragedy"
16. "Something in Your Eyes"
17. "What the Future Holds" (Single Mix)
18. "Heartbreak in This City" (Single Mix)
19. "Neon Blue"
20. "Scared of the Dark"
21. "Story of a Heart"
22. "One For Sorrow" (JRMX Club Mix)
23. "Scared Of The Dark" (SoundFactory Paradise Anthem)
24. "It’s The Way You Make Me Feel" (Shortland Remix)
25. "Something In Your Eyes" (SoundFactory Paradise Anthem)
26. "Better Best Forgotten" (Shortland Remix)
27. "Chain Reaction" (Almighty Mix Radio Edit)
28. "A Hundred Years Of Winter" (7th Heaven Club Mix)
29. "Better The Devil You Know" (JRMX Remix)
30. "Stomp" (Stomp'n Remix)
31. "The Runner" (7th Heaven Extended Mix)

=== Notes ===
- Each solo version of the Platinum Collection has an alternative track list picked by each member of their favourite tracks along with solo artwork. Tracks 1–15, and 19-20 are the same on each solo version.
- "Story of a Heart" is removed from each solo version.
- On streaming versions of the album, "Scared of the Dark" and "Deeper Shade of Blue" are switched in the track listing. The rest of the tracks stay in place.

== Charts ==
Chart performance for Platinum Collection
Chart (2022)	Peak position
Australian Albums (ARIA)	78
Belgian Albums (Ultratop Flanders)	47
Irish Albums (OCC)	13
Scottish Albums (OCC)	1
UK Albums (OCC)	1

== Certifications ==
Certifications for Platinum Collection
Region	Certification	Certified units/sales
United Kingdom (BPI)	Silver	60,000^{‡}
^{‡} Sales+streaming figures based on certification alone.

== Release history ==
Release history for Platinum Collection
Region	Date	Formats	Labels	Refs.
Various	19 August 2022	Box set; cassette; CD; digital download; streaming; vinyl	Sony Music Entertainment	
