= Platinum Megamix =

Single by Steps
- Released: 3 June 2022
- Length: 7:17
- Label: Sony

Steps singles chronology
"A Hundred Years of Winter" (2021)	"Platinum Megamix" (2022)	"Hard 2 Forget" (2022)

Music video
- "Platinum Megamix" on YouTube

"Platinum Megamix" is a megamix by British group Steps, released on 3 June 2022 as a non-album single and in promotion of their forthcoming compilation album, Platinum Collection, released on 19 August 2022. The group appeared on BBC's The One Show on 1 June 2022 to announce the release of the album and the single.

== Music video ==
The music video was released on 1 June 2022. It features a set of computer-generated dioramas patterned after, and featuring "screens" playing scenes from, the music videos of the songs featured in the mix. The video also cuts to full-screen clips from some of the videos it features (denoted with an asterisk in the list below).

- 5, 6, 7, 8
- Last Thing on My Mind
- One for Sorrow*
- It's the Way You Make Me Feel
- Better the Devil You Know
- What the Future Holds (song)*
- You'll Be Sorry
- Deeper Shade of Blue*
- After the Love Has Gone
- Scared of the Dark*
- Something in Your Eyes*
- Here and Now
- Neon Blue*
- The Slightest Touch
- Stomp*
- Hard 2 Forget*
- Love's Got a Hold on My Heart
- Summer of Love*
- Better Best Forgotten
- Heartbreak in This City*
- Tragedy*

Additional shots show the members of Steps watching the presentation in a theatre, sitting behind two younger versions of themselves (from footage shot for the music video for Love's Got a Hold on My Heart).

== Live performances ==
On 4 June 2022, Steps performed the track (in a shorter form) live for the first time at the Big Jubilee Street Party, commemorating the Queen's seventieth year on the throne. Lee was absent from the performance due to illness.

== Charts ==
Chart (2022)	Peak position
UK Singles Downloads (OCC)	15
