= Live! 2012 =

Live album by Steps
- Released: 2 June 2012
- Recorded: 19 April 2012
- Venue: The O2 Arena, London
- Genre: Pop
- Label: Concert Live

Steps chronology
The Ultimate Collection (2011)	Live! 2012 (2012)	Light Up the World (2012)

Live! 2012 is the third live album released by pop group Steps. The album was recorded during the band's The Ultimate Tour, which was the band's first arena tour since their Gold Tour in 2001. The album was released in June 2012.

== Track listing ==
1. "Here and Now / You'll Be Sorry" – 10:36
2. "Deeper Shade of Blue" – 8:39
3. "Dance Game / Better Best Forgotten / Love's Got a Hold on My Heart" – 12:45
4. "5, 6, 7, 8" – 3:11
5. "Summer of Love" – 6:51
6. "Better the Devil You Know / Judas" – 6:19
7. "Moves Like Jagger / S&M" – 4:28
8. "One Night Only" – 3:59
9. "Don't Stop Believing'" – 5:32
10. "Heaven / Beautiful People / Lately" – 5:02
11. "I Surrender" – 5:21
12. "It's the Way You Make Me Feel" – 5:30
13. "Heartbeat" – 5:57
14. "When I Said Goodbye" – 4:15
15. "One for Sorrow" – 4:35
16. "Stomp" – 4:36
17. "Chain Reaction" – 3:54
18. "Dancing Queen" – 4:08
19. "Tragedy" – 5:47

== Release history ==
Region	Date	Format	Version	Label	Ref
Australia / USA	2 June 2012	CD; Digital Download	Standard	Concert Live	
United Kingdom	9 June 2012	Standard	Standard	Concert Live	

== See also ==
- The Ultimate Tour (Steps)
