= Light Up the World =

Light Up the World may refer to:

- Light Up the World (Desperation Band album)
- Light Up the World (Steps album)
- "Light Up the World" (Glee song), 2011
- "Light Up the World" (Steps song), 2012
- Light Up the World Foundation, a non-profit humanitarian organization involved in the appropriate technology movement
