= Take Me for a Ride =

Single by Steps

from the album What the Future Holds Pt. 2
- Released: 29 July 2021
- Genre: Electropop
- Length: 3:16
- Label: BMG
- Songwriters: Mark Topham; Karl Twigg

Steps singles chronology
"Heartbreak in This City" (2021)	"Take Me for a Ride" (2021)	"The Slightest Touch" (2021)

Music videos
- "Take Me for a Ride" on YouTube; "Take Me for a Ride" (remix) on YouTube

"Take Me for a Ride" is a song recorded by British group Steps, released in July 2021 as the second single from their seventh studio album, What the Future Holds Pt. 2 (2021). The single peaked at number 27 on UK Download chart.

== Background and release ==
The song premiered on 29 July 2021 on Zoe Ball's show on BBC Radio 2 and was released on all digital and streaming partners immediately after. Speaking of the single, Steps said "It's much darker than what we have done in the past and the lyrics tell a real story about someone being gaslighted in a relationship, a topic that's finally getting the attention it deserves. It's one of several songs on the new What the Future Holds Pt. 2 album that takes our Steps sound in exciting new directions. We can't wait to hear what everyone thinks about the track and the album as a whole. We hope you love it as much as we do."

== Music video ==
The music video was directed by Jordan Rossi and released on 26 August 2021. The video features choreography by Mark Jennings and styling by Frank Strachan. The band said they had a lot of fun shooting the new clip. "This was one of our all-time favourite video shoots, the day itself was such good fun and we're delighted with the end result. We think the ultra-modern direction might come as a surprise to some people – but much like the song itself, it keeps the essence of Steps but takes what we're best known for in exciting new directions!"

== Tracklist ==
Digital download/streaming

1. "Take Me for a Ride" (single mix) - 3:16

Remixes

1. "Take Me for Ride" - 3:44
2. "Take Me for Ride" (Initial Talk Remix Edit) - 3:44
3. "Take Me for Ride" (Shortland Remix Edit) - 3:22
4. "Take Me for Ride" (7th Heaven Remix Edit) - 3:32
5. "Take Me for Ride" (Rouge Digit Slippery Dancefloor Mix) - 5:37
6. "Take Me for Ride" (Acoustic) - 3:32
7. "Take Me for Ride" (Shortland Club Mix) - 6:12
8. "Take Me for Ride" (Initial Club Mix) - 4:49
9. "Take Me for Ride" (7th Heaven Club Mix) - 6:10
10. "Take Me for Ride" (Single Mix) - 3:16

== Charts ==
Chart (2021)	Peak position
UK Singles Downloads (OCC)	27
