= What the Future Holds Pt. 2 =

Studio album by Steps
- Released: 10 September 2021
- Genre: Pop; dance-pop; electropop
- Length: 52:03
- Label: BMG

Steps chronology
What the Future Holds (2020)	What the Future Holds Pt. 2 (2021)	Platinum Collection (2022)

Singles from What the Future Holds
- 1. "Heartbreak in This City" Released: 25 February 2021; 2. "Take Me for a Ride" Released: 29 July 2021; 3. "The Slightest Touch" Released: 20 August 2021; 4. "A Hundred Years of Winter" Released: 19 November 2021

What the Future Holds Pt. 2 is the seventh studio album by the British group Steps. It is a sequel to the sixth album What the Future Holds. The album was released on 10 September 2021 by BMG Rights Management.

== Background ==
In April 2021, Steps announced what was intended to be a deluxe edition of What the Future Holds would now be released as their seventh studio album, What the Future Holds Pt. 2. Claire Richards described the new record, "we see What the Future Holds Pt. 2 as the perfect companion piece to the original album. The new record is classic Steps but also explores some brand-new sounds."

== Singles ==
The first single was confirmed as "Heartbreak in This City" remix featuring singer and television personality Michelle Visage. It debuted on BBC Radio 2 on 25 February, and made available to stream/download that same day. The single debuted at number 25 on the Official Singles Sales Chart.

"Take Me for a Ride" was released on 29 July 2021 as the album's second single.

A cover of "The Slightest Touch" was released on 20 August 2021 as the album's third single.

In November 2021 and during opening night of the arena tour, Lee Latchford-Evans confirmed "A Hundred Years of Winter" was the next single. It was released on 19 November 2021.

== Commercial performance ==
What the Future Holds Pt. 2 debuted at number 2 in the UK Albums Charts with 20,000 units sold, only 4,000 copies behind Manic Street Preachers' The Ultra Vivid Lament. This was the second time the two groups competed for number-one position, after their albums This Is My Truth Tell Me Yours and Step One also charted at number 1 and 2, respectively, way back in 1998. This marks Steps' third consecutive number 2 studio album since their reunion in 2012, next to Tears on the Dancefloor and What the Future Holds Pt. 1.

In Australia, the album debuted at number 11, Steps' highest peak in the country in 23 years, since their debut album Step One peaked at number 5 in 1998.

== Track listing ==
Standard edition
No.	Title	Writer(s)	Length
1.	"Take Me for a Ride"	Mark Topham; Karl Twigg	3:44
2.	"Heartbreak in This City" (single mix; with Michelle Visage)	Stella Attar; Twigg	3:27
3.	"Wasted Tears"	Christian Fast; Märta Grauers; Malin Johansson	3:40
4.	"A Hundred Years of Winter"	Darren Hayes; Walter Afanasieff	4:41
5.	"Living in a Lie"	Thomas G:son; Henrik Sethsson	3:03
6.	"A Million Years"	G:son; Johanna Jansson; Peter Boström; Mariette Hansson; Jenny Hansson	3:03
7.	"Trouble & Love"	Fiona Bevan; Carl Ryden	3:05
8.	"Victorious"	Jansson; Richard Edwards; Dino Medanhodzic; Melanie Wehbe	3:01
9.	"Kiss of Life"	Sara Ann Mathes; Bendik Møller; Charlie Bryce Wallace	3:01
10.	"High"	Dan Olsen; Chris Wahle	3:36
11.	"The Slightest Touch"	Michael Jay; Marvin Morrow	3:27
12.	"What the Future Holds" (acoustic)	Greg Kurstin; Sia Furler	4:22
13.	"Something in Your Eyes" (acoustic)	Erik Bernholm; Henrik Sethsson; G:son	3:06
14.	"To the Beat of My Heart" (acoustic)	Sarah Thompson; Uzoechi Emenike; Annie Yuill; Benjamin Taylor; Brian Higgins; Keir MacCulloch; Kyle Mackenzie; Lee Voss; Matthew Grey; Miranda Cooper; Mollie King	3:04
15.	"Heartbreak in This City" (acoustic; with Michelle Visage)	Twigg; Attar	3:50
Total length:			52:10

Lee version bonus tracks
No.	Title	Length
16.	"Message from Lee"
17.	"To the One" (Shortland club remix)

H version bonus tracks
No.	Title	Length
16.	"Message from H"
17.	"A Hundred Years of Winter" (Shortland club remix)

Claire version bonus tracks
No.	Title	Length
16.	"Message from Claire"
17.	"The Slightest Touch" (7th Heaven extended mix)

Faye version bonus tracks
No.	Title	Length
16.	"Message from Faye"
17.	"To the Beat of My Heart" (GMJS trance mix)

Lisa version bonus tracks
No.	Title	Length
16.	"Message from Lisa"
17.	"Wasted Tears" (Initial Talk club mix)

Digital and deluxe version bonus tracks (Note: The physical deluxe edition of the album includes tracks 12 – 24 on a second disc.)
No.	Title	Writer(s)	Length
16.	"Take Me for a Ride" (Initial Talk remix edit)	Topham; Twigg	3:44
17.	"What the Future Holds" (7th Heaven remix; edit)	Kurstin; Furler	4:14
18.	"Father's Eyes" (Shanghai Surprise; edit)	Arnthor Birgisson; Ina Wroldsen	3:26
19.	"To the Beat of My Heart" (Shortland tropical mix)	Thompson; Emenike; Yuill; Taylor; Higgins; MacCulloch; Mackenzie; Voss; Grey; Cooper; King	3:30
20.	"Wasted Tears" (Initial Talk remix edit)	Fast; Grauers; Johansson	3:55
21.	"Clouds" (Conway remix; edit)	Emma Rohan; Grace Barker; Jez Ashurst	3:28
22.	"Heartbreak in This City" (Saint remix edit)	Attar; Twigg	4:08
23.	"Something in Your Eyes" (7th Heaven remix; edit)	Bernholm; Sethsson; G:son	3:38
24.	"Under My Skin" (Shortland remix; edit)	Charlie Walshe; Farley Arvidsson; Rachel Furner	2:42
Total length:			47:04

Afterparty edition bonus tracks
No.	Title	Length
16.	"What the Future Holds" (album megamix)	7:23
17.	"Take Me for a Ride" (Rogue Digit slippery dancefloor mix)	5:37
18.	"The Slightest Touch" (7th Heaven extended mix)	6:01
19.	"To the Beat of My Heart" (GMJS trance mix)	5:53
20.	"To the One" (Shortland club remix)	6:45
21.	"Take Me for a Ride" (7th Heaven club mix)	6:10
22.	"Wasted Tears" (Initial Talk club mix)	5:46
23.	"A Hundred Years of Winter" (Shortland club mix)	7:14
24.	"Take Me for a Ride" (Initial Talk club mix)	4:50
25.	"To the Beat of My Heart" (Shortland tropical extended mix)	6:17

Morning After edition bonus tracks
No.	Title	Length
16.	"Take Me for a Ride" (acoustic)	3:33
17.	"The Slightest Touch" (acoustic)	3:31
18.	"Something in Your Eyes" (alternative radio mix)	3:04
19.	"Heartbreak in This City" (Steps only single mix)	3:28
20.	"What the Future Holds" (karaoke version)	3:20
21.	"Something in Your Eyes" (karaoke version)	3:02
22.	"To the Beat of My Heart" (karaoke version)	3:10
23.	"Heartbreak in This City" (karaoke version)	3:28
24.	"Take Me for a Ride" (karaoke version)	3:18
25.	"The Slightest Touch" (karaoke version)	3:26

== Charts ==
Chart performance for What the Future Holds Pt. 2
Chart (2021)	Peak position
Australian Albums (ARIA)	11
Belgian Albums (Ultratop Flanders)	99
Irish Albums (OCC)	22
Irish Independent Albums (IRMA)	2
Scottish Albums (OCC)	2
UK Albums (OCC)	2
UK Independent Albums (OCC)	1

== Release history ==
Release history for What the Future Holds Pt.2
Region	Date	Formats	Labels	Refs.
Various	10 September 2021	Box set; cassette; CD; digital download; streaming; vinyl	BMG	
