= Light Up the World (Steps album) =

Studio album by Steps
- Released: 12 November 2012
- Recorded: August–October 2012
- Genre: Pop
- Length: 34:41
- Label: Warner Music

Steps chronology
Live! 2012 (2012)	Light Up the World (2012)	Tears on the Dancefloor (2017)

Singles from Light Up the World
- 1. "Light Up the World" Released: 22 October 2012

Light Up the World is the first Christmas album, and the fourth studio album, by British pop group Steps. The album was released on 12 November 2012 after it was announced on 24 September 2012. It is the band's first studio album since 2000's Buzz. It is also the first release on Steps' own label, Steps Recordings. Recording sessions began in August 2012, and took place over a period of two months, concluding in October 2012.

The album's promotion included a lead single release, "Light Up the World", an original song, as well as many performances of the single on TV shows including This Morning and QVC; the music video for the song was the performance from This Morning. The album was also supported by album signings across the UK and a 6-date UK tour entitled Christmas with Steps, which was a Christmas themed small theatre tour that used a real band to play many of their hits that they performed as well as songs that the band didn't perform on their Ultimate Tour.

== Critical reception ==
Professional ratings
Review scores
Source	Rating
AllMusic	3/5 stars
Entertainment Focus	4/5 stars
Impact	1/5 stars
The Independent	1/5 stars
So So Gay	3/5 stars
The Yorkshire Times	2.5/5 stars

The album has received mixed reviews, with most of the criticism to do with the album's departure from Steps' previous work and how it could alienate the group's fan base. Despite it not being particularly groundbreaking, the album has been highly praised for being technically proficient. The decision to include mostly covers has been questioned, and some of the individual song choices (which are depressing in nature) have baffled some critics, who criticised the new sound as neither reminiscent of Steps nor Christmas. The work is seen by some to mark a new era of the band, i.e. a form of reinvention.

Max Palmer-Geaves of The Courier Online gave the album a positive review, saying: "Steps' Christmas effort evokes classic fireside imagery associated with the festive period, moving away from the neo-disco clichés of their nineties records, the album has a choral feel, more akin to that of latter day Bublé". Palmer-Geaves remarked that the female harmonies left him "overjoyed" and "weak at the knees", and felt the album's "unexpected turn" toward "One Less Bell to Answer" "makes it clear [Steps] are a group with many strings to their bow". He said the title track "harks back to the...[group's] original sound, though it is a more mature take on their powerful ballads" but argued that "When She Loved Me" is "a poorly placed cover as the listener is instantly removed from the winter wonderland that they have been placed in and transported into Toy Story 2". Palmer-Geaves finished the review by saying: "Christmas album or not, Steps are still as relevant as they ever were".

Nick Haynes of Get to the Front said the album would "no doubt provide the soundtrack to many a giggly, pinot grigio-fuelled evening in the weeks leading up to Christmas". He argued the album's "intentions" are plainly stated from the album's opening track; "nice, safe, singalong, well produced, bland pop...there's nothing wrong it, but equally, nothing stands out about it". Haynes said that "vocally, the band have probably never sounded better", but felt that the songs do not provide the group much opportunity to use their voices to their full potential, lacking anything "punchy" for them to sing. Nevertheless, Haynes felt that the title track "is a stand-out highlight [with] lush instrumentation, a soaring chorus, decent lyrics and great vocals", and put this down to the fact that it is the only original song on the album. Reasoning that while the first two-thirds consist of "rather obscure covers", "the final third contains a trio of classic Christmas tracks", which while nice in their own right "really don't add anything to those songs and there have been far superior versions recorded over the years". Furthermore, he said that "for the success of the reunion to continue, the truth is the material has got to be so much better", feeling that covers were chosen "due to a lack of time to work on an album and a desire to get new material out [in 2013]" and by doing so, "they've done more harm than good". While commending "Light Up the World" as on par with the group's "best ballads", the series of covers "le[ft him] cold and...disappointed". In conclusion, Haynes stated that the new album should have been a "shameless return to the magic of their 90s pop sound" and described the new direction as a missed opportunity.

AllMusic's review stated that "while Light Up the World may not quench longtime fans' thirst for a wholly original Steps recording, the holiday theme is clearly a comfortable way for the band to get back into the studio and reintroduce itself to a more mature fan base". The website also felt that Steps' "sound" has not changed much since they broke up, "always [having] been a light, well-produced pop ensemble", producing "slick, studio-driven music". It pointed out that the tracks range from "the '70s pop of ABBA [to] the more synth-heavy adult contemporary sound of Kylie Minogue".

Jeremy Williams started off his The Yorkshire Times review by implying that the group released their "long-awaited" album to make money. In the midst of the release of the "promisingly poptastic title track", he said the group may be "misleading their fanbase somewhat, for Light Up the World is miles away from reliving their cheesy pop heyday". He argued that while "'History Is Made at Night' errs in the right direction, the collection veers towards a sincere edge only previously witnessed in Faye Tozer's solo outings", such as their cover of "When She Loved Me", which although "really highlights the unquestionable dexterity of the three girls' vocals", also "hardly fits with either the group's signature sound or the album's implicit Christmas joviality". "A House Is Not a Home" was also cited as a track which is "impressive as a recording, yet questionable on album suitability".

Williams said that the album achieves its original goal of providing a Christmas feel with the "trio of mediocre Christmas songs" at the very end. While describing the first two as "truly uninspired", he added that "'Have Yourself a Merry Little Christmas' once again highlights how scintillating the group's three female vocalists can be when allowed time to shine". He concluded his review by summing the entire album up and critically analysing how it could mark a new era for the group: "Overall, Light Up the World fails on many counts. It is far from a revival of the group's poptastic sound, nor does it really celebrate the joy of the Christmas season. However, what it does offer is an insight into how Steps could easily reinvent themselves in order to further revitalise their career...The album has some truly touching yet distinctly un-Steps moments that could be the key to longevity. Light Up the World will do anything but light up your Christmas season".

Fiona Shepherd of Scotsman.com also commented on some of the odd song choices, saying "'One Less Bell to Answer' and 'A House Is Not a Home'...are hardly festive fare, unless Steps want to emphasise the heart-crushing, suicidal loneliness of the season."

Emily Shackleton of Impact awarded the album one star out of five, but gave an overall mixed review. She said the album "merely consists of several incredibly similar demure slices of the 90s put together in a rather dreary festive package", and questioned whether this can "resonate with a 2012 audience". Despite thinking that "the record's slick production ensures the group's voices are clean and perfectly harmonized", she noted that the album lacks variety, with the entire album sitting firmly within the "quiet, sit-by-the-fire... safe sing along" genre, and added that the "signature part of the album" is the "dull slow tempo" of the majority of the songs. Shackleton observed the absence of the "catchy school disco hooks of '5, 6, 7, 8' or 'Tragedy' that gave Steps its place in childhood memories", and derided the group for "focusing instead on the boring, ballad side of manufactured pop that is easily forgotten". She felt that the Christmas cover theme "does them no favours", as most of the songs they sing on the album have already been sung countless times before, therefore adding to the "vast saturated pool of festive fodder". While paying particular attention to the "selection of covers", which she argued "could be quite disappointing for those who might have been looking forward to hearing new material", she opined that original songs are "not exactly Steps's forte", with many of their biggest hits such as the Bee Gees' "Tragedy" and Diana Ross's "Chain Reaction" also being covers. "Light Up the World", the title track, is the only original song, with Shackleton commenting that this "shows Steps sticking to what they know and illustrating no desire to stray much past that", resulting in a "lack of surprise" that Shackleton called the album's biggest fault. She concluded her review by saying "expecting more than...one tedious Christmas ballad after the other...or some element of musical growth and originality after twelve years apart would be anticipating too much from a band that have made their career by gaining hits using other artist's songs".

Simon Price gave a particularly harsh review, declaring: "the joke, surely, is over now...allowing [the 'cheesepop quintet'] to put out a Christmas album is a bridge too far". Price felt that the album is "a handful of festive standards padded out with a handful of wet ballads" and described it as a whole as "a predictably insipid, pulse-free affair". Price implied that the band was not good enough to be covering hits such as "Christmas (Baby Please Come Home)", saying "they ought to be arrested on the spot for even thinking about [it]".

== Track listing ==
No.	Title	Writer(s)	Producer	Length
1.	"History Is Made at Night"	Marc Shaiman; Scott Wittman	Stephen Lipson	4:12
2.	"Overjoyed"	Stevie Wonder	Stephen Lipson	3:40
3.	"It May Be Winter Outside"	Barry White; Paul Politi	Stephen Lipson	3:05
4.	"One Less Bell to Answer"	Burt Bacharach; Hal David	Stephen Lipson	4:56
5.	"A House Is Not a Home"	Burt Bacharach; Hal David	Stephen Lipson	3:02
6.	"Light Up the World"	Karl Twigg; Yamit Mamo	Karl Twigg	3:38
7.	"When She Loved Me"	Randy Newman	Stephen Lipson	3:21
8.	"Christmas (Baby Please Come Home)" (H solo)	Jeff Barry; Ellie Greenwich; Phil Spector	Stephen Lipson	3:04
9.	"Please Come Home for Christmas" (Lee solo)	Charles Brown; Gene Redd	Stephen Lipson	2:47
10.	"Have Yourself a Merry Little Christmas"	Ralph Blane; Hugh Martin	Stephen Lipson	4:16
Total length:				34:41

== Release history ==
Region	Date	Format	Label
United Kingdom	12 November 2012	CD, digital download	Warner Music
