= The Last Dance (Steps album) =

Remix album by Steps
- Released: 25 November 2002
- Recorded: 1997–2001
- Genre: Pop
- Length: 116:25
- Label: Jive
- Producer: Pete Waterman

Steps chronology
| Gold: Greatest Hits (2001) | The Last Dance (2002) | The Ultimate Collection (2011) |

The Last Dance is the second compilation album from pop group Steps, and was released eleven months after the group had disbanded. It contains a selection of B-sides and remixes of previous singles and received extremely limited promotion prior to its release. The album reached number 57 in the UK. A 49-track edition is currently available digitally.

== Track listing ==
CD one
| No. | Title | Writer(s) | Length |
|---|---|---|---|
| 1. | "Overture" | Barry Upton; Steve Crosby; Mike Topham; Karl Twigg; Lance Ellington; Jackie James; Mike Stock; Pete Waterman; Sara Dallin; Keren Woodward; Rita Campbell; Bernard Edwards; Nile Rodgers; Barry Gibb; Maurice Gibb; Robin Gibb | 4:22 |
| 2. | "Too Busy Thinking About My Baby" | Norman Whitfield; Barrett Strong; Janie Bradford | 2:49 |
| 3. | "To Be Your Hero" | Frampton; Waterman | 3:49 |
| 4. | "Baby Don't Dance" (W.I.P. Radio Edit) | Peter Cunnah; Simon Ellis | 3:51 |
| 5. | "Human Touch" (W.I.P. Mix) | Topham; Twigg | 3:59 |
| 6. | "I Know Him So Well" | Benny Andersson; Tim Rice; Björn Ulvaeus | 4:14 |
| 7. | "Lay All Your Love On Me" | Andersson; Ulvaeus | 4:26 |
| 8. | "You'll Be Sorry" (W.I.P. Radio Mix) | Topham; Twigg | 4:08 |
| 9. | "Merry Xmas Everybody" (W.I.P. Mix) | Noddy Holder; Jimmy Lea | 3:10 |
| 10. | "Why?" | Topham; Twigg | 4:08 |
| 11. | "Mars And Venus (We Fall In Love Again)" (W.I.P. Mix) | Dane DeViller; Sean Hosein; Jörgen Elofsson; Andy Goldmark | 3:59 |
| 12. | "Just Like The First Time" (W.I.P. Mix) | Frampton; Waterman | 3:43 |
| 13. | "One for Sorrow" (Sleaze Sisters Anthem Edit) | Topham; Twigg; Ellington | 4:15 |
| 14. | "Deeper Shade of Blue" (Sleaze Sisters Anthem PA Edit) | Topham; Twigg | 4:01 |

CD two
| No. | Title | Length |

1. 5,6,7,8 [W.I.P. 2002 Remix] (Upton/Crosby) – 5:26
2. Tragedy [W.I.P. Reception Mix] (Gibb/Gibb/Gibb) – 6:57
3. Last Thing on My Mind [Wip't Up In The Disco Mix] (Stock/Waterman/Dallin/Woodward) – 5:39
4. One for Sorrow [W.I.P. Mix] (Topham/Twigg/Ellington) – 6:53
5. Better Best Forgotten [W.I.P. '99 Cream of Manchester Mix] (Frampton/Waterman) – 6:16
6. Love's Got a Hold on My Heart [W.I.P. Off The Wall Mix] (Frampton/Waterman) – 6:12
7. After The Love Has Gone [W.I.P. Mix] (Topham/Twigg/Ellington) – 4:35
8. Deeper Shade of Blue [W.I.P. Mix] (Topham/Twigg) – 6:47
9. Summer Of Love [W.I.P. Remix] (Topham/Twigg) – 6:38
10. Stomp [W.I.P. Mix] (Topham/Twigg/Campbell/Edwards/Rodgers) – 6:08
- W.I.P. = Work In Progress

A new version has been released digitally on 27 February 2020, now containing 49 tracks.

1. Overture – 4:20
2. Just Like The First Time – 3:28
3. One For Sorrow (Tony Moran Remix) – 3:29
4. Human Touch – 3:56
5. Too Busy Thinking About My Baby – 2:49
6. You'll Be Sorry (The W.I.P. Radio Mix) – 4:08
7. To Be Your Hero – 3:48
8. Baby Don't Dance (W.I.P. Radio Edit) – 3:51
9. Lay All Your Love On Me – 4:25
10. Mars & Venus (We Fall In Love Again) – 3:51
11. Stomp (Dance Man's Cosmic Funk Mix) – 4:29
12. In It For Love – 3:23
13. Summer Of Love (D-Bop's Tequila Sunrise Vocal Mix) – 6:51
14. A Love To Last – 3:41
15. Better Best Forgotten (Nip On The Dance Floor W.I.P. Mix) – 5:19
16. Bittersweet – 3:58
17. Here And Now (Almighty Edit) – 4:07
18. Words Of Wisdom – 3:52
19. Deeper Shade Of Blue (Sleazesisters Anthem PA Edit) – 4:00
20. Stop Me From Loving You – 3:42
21. 5, 6, 7, 8 (W.I.P. 2002 Remix) – 5:25
22. Why? – 4:09
23. Merry Xmas everybody – 3:08
24. Chain Reaction (Graham Stack Extended Mix) – 6:26
1. 5, 6, 7, 8 (Euro Step Mix)
2. Last Thing On My Mind (Wip't Up The Disco Mix) – 5:39
3. One For Sorrow (Sleazesisters Anthem Mix) – 4:12
4. Tragedy (W.I.P. Reception Mix) – 6:57
5. Heatbeat (Simon Hill Mix) – 4:38
6. Better Best Forgotten (W.I.P. '99 Cream Of Manchester Mix) – 6:15
7. Love's Got A Hold On My Heart (W.I.P. Off The Wall Mix) – 6:11
8. After The Love Has Gone (W.I.P. Mix) – 5:36
9. Say You'll Be Mine (Matt Pop's Old Skool Mix) – 5:29
10. Better The Devil You Know (2T's 2 Go Mix) – 5:41
11. Deeper Shade Of Blue (W.I.P. Mix) – 6:46
12. Summer Of Love (W.I.P. Mix) – 6:40
13. Stomp (W.I.P. Mix) – 6:07
14. It's The Way You Make Me Feel (Sleazesisters Anthem Edit) – 3:24
15. Here And Now (Sleazesisters Anthem Edit) – 3:31
16. You'll Be Sorry (W.I.P. Bach To Classics Mix) – 6:48
17. Chain Reaction (Almighty Mix) – 8:13
18. Words Are Not Enough (Sleazesisters Anthem Edit) – 5:06
19. I Know Him So Well (Almighty Mix) – 7:15
20. One For Sorrow (W.I.P. Remix) – 6:52
21. Just Like The First Time (W.I.P. Remix) – 3:42
22. Chain Reaction (Xenomania Edit) – 4:16
23. Human Touch (W.I.P. Remix) – 3:57
24. You'll Be Sorry (Sleazesisters Anthem Mix) – 8:07
25. One For Sorrow (Soul Solution Extended Vocal Mix) – 5:05

== Charts and certifications ==
=== Charts ===
| Chart (2002) | Peak position |
|---|---|
| UK Albums Chart | 57 |

=== Certifications ===
| Region | Certification | Certified units/sales |
|---|---|---|
| United Kingdom (BPI) | Gold | 100,000^{‡} |
^{‡} Sales+streaming figures based on certification alone.
