= Hard 2 Forget =

2020 song by Vincint

Single by Vincint

from the album There Will Be Tears
- Released: 31 July 2020
- Length: 3:27
- Songwriters: Vincint Cannady; James Abrahart
- Producer: Harrison Mead

Music video
- "Hard 2 Forget" on YouTube

"Hard 2 Forget" is a song by American singer–songwriter Vincint. It was released as single in July 2020 as the lead single from his debut studio album There Will Be Tears.

== Steps version ==
"Hard 2 Forget"

Single by Steps

from the album Platinum Collection
- Released: 7 July 2022
- Label: Steps Music; Fascination; Sony
- Songwriters: Vincint Cannady; James Abrahart
- Producer: The Alias

Steps singles chronology
| "Platinum Megamix" (2022) | "Hard 2 Forget" (2022) |

Music video
- "Hard 2 Forget" on YouTube

British group Steps recorded a cover of hard 2 Forget and released it on 7 July 2022 as the lead single from their third greatest hits collection, Platinum Collection.

The song premiered on Zoe Ball's BBC Radio 2 on 7 July, and its video was released the same day, featuring RuPaul's Drag Race UK star Charity Kase.

Upon release, the group said "The moment we heard it, we knew it had the DNA of a classic Steps song but with a modern edge. We hope you all love it as much as we do."

=== Formats and track listings ===
Digital download

1. "Hard 2 Forget" – 3:29

Hard 2 Forget (Remixes) – EP

1. "Hard 2 Forget" (7th Heaven Radio Edit) – 3:51
2. "Hard 2 Forget" (Shortland Radio Edit) – 3:28
3. "Hard 2 Forget" (7th Heaven Club Mix) – 7:17
4. "Hard 2 Forget" (Shortland Club Mix) – 5:35
5. "Hard 2 Forget" – 3:29

=== Charts ===
Weekly chart performance for "Hard 2 Forget"
| Chart (2022) | Peak position |
|---|---|
| UK Singles Downloads (OCC) | 22 |
