= Heartbreak in This City =

Single by Steps and Michelle Visage

from the album What the Future Holds Pt. 2
- Released: 25 February 2021
- Genre: Dance-pop; disco
- Length: 3:26
- Label: BMG
- Songwriters: Karl Twigg; Stella Attar

Steps singles chronology
"To the Beat of My Heart" (2021)	"Heartbreak in This City" (2021)	"Take Me for a Ride" (2021)

Music video
- "Heartbreak in This City" on YouTube

"Heartbreak in This City" is a song recorded by British group Steps from their sixth studio album, What the Future Holds (2020). A single mix was released with singer and television personality Michelle Visage in February 2021 as the lead single from their seventh studio album, What the Future Holds Pt. 2 (2021). The single peaked at number 15 on UK Download chart.

== Background and release ==
Speaking about the collaboration, Claire Richards said to Retro Pop "We did an Insta Live with Michelle in November as part of our promotion and when we put the phone down, our manager came up with the idea and asked her. To me, it couldn't be more perfect. I think if we're going to do it with anybody, then she is actually the perfect choice. She's even more camp than we are – which is a feat in itself!" Richards added, "I'm not sure if it was planned to be the next single anyway, but when Adam [Steps' manager] had the idea, he literally said, 'We should get Michelle to do 'Heartbreak in This City' with us. That was it. She said 'Yes' straight away, she didn't even think about it."

Faye Tozer revealed that Visage has long been a close friend to the group, and that Tozer and Visage have crossed paths on multiple occasions and even chat regularly on WhatsApp, saying "Not only did Michelle and I have the same dance partner Giovanni Pernice on Strictly Come Dancing, but we both played the role of Miss Hedge in the West End production of Everybody's Talking About Jamie. We've since become good friends and constantly chat all things Strictly and Drag Race by WhatsApp."

The song premiered on The Radio 2 Breakfast Show on BBC Radio 2 with Alan Carr on 25 February 2021 and was released immediately after.

== Music video ==
The music video was released on 1 April 2021. It sees Visage heading into a high security facility, where she punches in the security code "5,6,7,8" and joins the members of Steps to tackle heartbreak – through pop music and dance moves.

== Tracklist ==
Digital Single

1. "Heartbreak in This City" (Single Mix) - 3:26
2. "Heartbreak in This City" (Steps Solo) - 3:27

Digital download/streaming (Remixes)

1. "Heartbreak in This City" (Single Mix) - 3:26
2. "Heartbreak in This City" (Shortland Remix) [Edit] - 3:26
3. "Heartbreak in This City" (Saint Remix) [Edit] - 4:08
4. "Heartbreak in This City" (Shortland Remix) - 6:32
5. "Heartbreak in This City" (Saint Remix) - 6:11
6. "Heartbreak in This City" (Steps Solo) - 3:27

Remixes

1. "Heartbreak in This City" (Single Mix) - 3:26
2. "Heartbreak in This City" (Shortland Remix) [Edit] - 3:26
3. "Heartbreak in This City" (Saint Remix) [Edit] - 4:08
4. "Heartbreak in This City" (Acoustic) - 3:50
5. "Heartbreak in This City" (Shortland Remix) - 6:32
6. "Heartbreak in This City" (Saint Remix) - 6:11

== Charts ==
Chart (2021)	Peak position
UK Singles Downloads (OCC)	15
