= A Hundred Years of Winter =

Single by Steps

from the album What the Future Holds Pt. 2
- Released: 18 November 2021
- Genre: Synthpop; electropop
- Length: 3:33
- Label: BMG
- Songwriters: Darren Hayes; Walter Afanasieff

Steps singles chronology
"The Slightest Touch" (2021)	"A Hundred Years of Winter" (2021)	"Platinum Megamix" (2022)

Music video
- "A Hundred Years of Winter" on YouTube

"A Hundred Years of Winter" is a song recorded by British group Steps, released on 18 November 2021 as the fourth single from their seventh studio album, What the Future Holds Pt. 2 (2021). The song was released with a single edit, F9 and Shortland remixes.

== Background and release ==
In early November 2021 and during opening night of the arena tour, Lee Latchford-Evans confirmed "A Hundred Years of Winter" was the next single.

== Music video ==
The music video was released on 19 November 2021. The predominantly black and white video sees the group singing the song outside with snow falling around them. Two thirds through, the snow stops and the video is in full colour.

== Track listing ==
Digital EP

1. "A Hundred Years of Winter" (F9 Remix Edit) – 3:39
2. "A Hundred Years of Winter" (Shortland Club Mix Edit) – 4:12
3. "A Hundred Years of Winter" (Edit) – 3:34
4. "A Hundred Years of Winter" (F9 Remix) – 4:16
5. "A Hundred Years of Winter" (Shortland Club Mix) – 7:13
6. "A Hundred Years of Winter" – 4:41

Other versions

- 7th Heaven Club Mix – 7:21
- 7th Heaven Radio Edit – 4:51

== Charts ==
Chart performance for "A Hundred Years of Winter"
Chart (2021)	Peak position
UK Singles Downloads (OCC)	98
