= Light Up the World (Steps song) =

"Light Up The World"

Single by Steps

from the album Light Up the World
- Released: 19 October 2012
- Recorded: 2012
- Genre: Pop
- Length: 3:29
- Label: Steps Recordings
- Songwriters: KarlTwigg, Mamo
- Producer: Karl Twigg

Steps singles chronology
"Words Are Not Enough" / "I Know Him So Well" (2001)	"Light Up The World" (2012)	"Scared of the Dark" (2017)

Lyric video
- "Light Up the World" on YouTube

"Light Up The World" is the sixteenth single from the British group Steps, released in 2012 to promote their fourth studio album Light Up the World. The track saw the group reunited with long term collaborators Topham & Twigg. The single failed to live up to the group's previous success and missed the UK top 75 entirely, charting at number 82 - breaking their string of top 5 hits that they achieved between 1998 and 2001.

== Music video ==
No music video was recorded to support the track, however a winter themed lyric video was produced and released to YouTube.

== Personnel ==
- Lee Latchford-Evans – lead and backing vocals
- Claire Richards – lead and backing vocals
- Lisa Scott-Lee – lead and backing vocals
- Faye Tozer – lead and backing vocals
- Ian "H" Watkins – lead and backing vocals

== Track listings ==
=== Digital Download 1 ===
1. "Light Up The World"

=== Digital Download 2 ===
1. "Light Up The World (7th Heaven Remix) - 5:46"
2. "Light Up The World (7th Heaven Radio Edit) - 3:44"

The remix contained instrumental elements of Steps' biggest hit, "Tragedy".

== Chart performance ==
The single entered the UK Singles Chart at number 82 and fell out of the chart the following week.

=== Chart positions ===
Chart (2012)	Peak position
UK Singles Chart	82
UK Indie (OCC)	6
