= Buzz (Steps album) =

Studio album by Steps
- Released: 30 October 2000
- Genres: Pop; dance
- Length: 55:55
- Label: Jive
- Producers: Jimmy Bralower; Dane DeViller; Jörgen Elofsson; Andrew Frampton; Andy Goldmark; Ray Hedges; Sean Hosein; David Kreuger; Josef Larossi; Chris Porter; Riprock 'n' Alex; Andreas Romdhane; Graham Stack; Mark Topham; Karl Twigg; Pete Waterman

Steps chronology
| Steptacular (1999) | Buzz (2000) | Gold: Greatest Hits (2001) |

Singles from Buzz
- 1. "Stomp" Released: 16 October 2000; 2. "It's the Way You Make Me Feel" Released: 1 January 2001; 3. "Here and Now" / "You'll Be Sorry" Released: 4 June 2001; 4. "Mars & Venus (We Fall in Love Again)" Released: 31 July 2001

Alternative cover
- International cover

Buzz is the third studio album by British pop group Steps, released on 30 October 2000. It reached number four on the UK Albums Chart. The album saw the group starting to move away from the PWL sound to a more mature sound, working with producers from Sweden and songwriters such as Cyndi Lauper. This more mature sound was also echoed in the new material from Gold: Greatest Hits.

Each member of the group co-wrote a track on the album, consequently doing lead vocals on their respective track. The lead single from the album "Stomp", a funky upbeat song with lyrics about partying at the weekend and having a good time, features a sample from Chic's single "Everybody Dance" and topped the UK Singles Chart, becoming the group's second number-one hit, after "Heartbeat" / "Tragedy". The songs "Better the Devil You Know" and "Summer of Love", were included on the album after they were released earlier that year as part of double A-side singles with "Say You'll Be Mine" and "When I Said Goodbye" respectively.

"It's the Way You Make Me Feel" was the second single to be released from the album and reached number two in the UK after copies of the single were released a week early in shops; this led to the band setting a chart record for the highest chart jump when the track went from number 72 to number two. "Here and Now" and "You'll Be Sorry" were the final songs released from Buzz and were both included on a double A-side CD single which reached number four in the UK. In the United States, "Mars & Venus (We Fall in Love Again)" was released as the album's only single in July 2001. Buzz was certified Platinum in UK and was released in Australia and US in 2001.

The album was reissued on vinyl for the first time ever in February 2024. It debuted at number 7 on the UK Vinyl Albums Chart.

== Release and reception ==
Professional ratings
Review scores
| Source | Rating |
|---|---|
| AllMusic | 4/5 stars |
| NME | 4/5 stars |
| Yahoo! Music UK | 6/10 stars |

Buzz received favourable critical response from different music magazines and websites. Everyone noticed the group's departure from the "ABBA sound" into their own musical style. AllMusic stated "They do in fact have their own sound, and it has revealed itself here, crystal clear".

This album saw the group leaning toward a more mature and original sound influenced by electro and techno but still keeping the sound prominent to Steps' earlier work. This is seen as the album plays out through tracks such as "You'll Be Sorry", "Never Get Over You" "Happy Go Lucky" and "Buzzz". The art work and overall look for the album is prominent to the sound as their earlier albums had more colour and expression to resemble the enlightenment of the sound of their music. As their sound was more mature their appearances were more sophisticated and showed the progression of Steps into a new era that was carried on into the look of their next album, Gold: Greatest Hits.

In an interview with whereitsat.tv when Steps were asked if their Pete Waterman days where behind them, Lee responded with: "We've been under Pete Waterman's wing for a good two or three years and I think with the third album Buzz, we've had an experience and sort of self-expression and things, you know. We've had our chance, we've wrote, we've helped produce and we've got th[ose] songs on the album Buzz. Now that the greatest hits album is coming out, [we're] writing and helping produce for that as well and then there's an album after that. It's almost like leaving an era behind and moving onto something else, so you could see it as a new beginning in a way."

However, the album is said to be less successful than their first releases, only peaking at number four on the UK Albums Chart and achieving double Platinum status from the British Phonographic Industry (BPI) – Step One was certified 8× Platinum and Steptacular was certified 4× Platinum. It is also considered to be their only album to not sell a million copies in the United Kingdom, before the group's Boxing Day split. To date, it has sold more than 680,000 units in UK, becoming their lowest-selling album while they were still together. The album also features solos from each member apart from Lee, though he is featured on the song he co-wrote, "Turn Around".

== Track listing ==
Buzz – UK edition
| No. | Title | Writer(s) | Producer(s) | Length |
|---|---|---|---|---|
| 1. | "Better the Devil You Know" | Mike Stock; Matt Aitken; Pete Waterman | Mark Topham; Karl Twigg; Waterman | 3:49 |
| 2. | "Stomp" | Topham; Twigg; Rita Campbell; Nile Rodgers; Bernard Edwards | Topham; Twigg; Waterman | 3:22 |
| 3. | "Summer of Love" | Topham; Twigg | Topham; Twigg; Waterman | 3:52 |
| 4. | "It's the Way You Make Me Feel" | Jörgen Elofsson | Elofsson; David Kreuger | 3:17 |
| 5. | "You'll Be Sorry" | Topham; Twigg | Topham; Twigg; Waterman | 4:06 |
| 6. | "Learn to Love Again" | Ian Watkins; Andrew Frampton | Frampton | 3:27 |
| 7. | "Never Get Over You" | Lisa Scott-Lee; Ray "Madman" Hedges; Nigel Butler | Hedges | 3:55 |
| 8. | "Hand on Your Heart" | Claire Richards; Andrew Frampton | Frampton | 4:03 |
| 9. | "Happy Go Lucky" | Andy Goldmark; Brad Daymond; Alex Greggs | Goldmark; Riprock 'n' Alex | 3:33 |
| 10. | "Buzzz" | Goldmark; Mark Mueller | Goldmark; Riprock 'n' Alex | 3:21 |
| 11. | "Here and Now" | Andreas Carlsson; Ali Thomson | Andreas "QUIZ" Romdhane; Josef Larossi | 3:45 |
| 12. | "Paradise Lost" | Topham; Twigg | Topham; Twigg; Waterman | 4:35 |
| 13. | "Turn Around" | Lee Latchford Evans; Michael Garvin; Oskar Paul | Graham Stack | 3:24 |
| 14. | "Wouldn't Hurt So Bad" | Goldmark; Mueller | Goldmark; Jimmy Bralower | 3:34 |
| 15. | "If You Believe" | Faye Tozer; Cyndi Lauper; Jan Pulsford; Jasper Irn | Chris Porter | 3:52 |
| Total length: | | | | 55:55 |

Buzz – International edition
| No. | Title | Writer(s) | Producer(s) | Length |
|---|---|---|---|---|
| 1. | "Stomp" | Topham; Twigg; Campbell | Topham; Twigg; Waterman | 3:22 |
| 2. | "It's the Way You Make Me Feel" | Elofsson | Elofsson; Kreuger | 3:17 |
| 3. | "Buzzz" | Goldmark; Mueller | Goldmark; Riprock 'n' Alex | 3:21 |
| 4. | "Here and Now" | Carlsson; Thomson | Romdhane; Larossi | 3:45 |
| 5. | "Happy Go Lucky" | Goldmark; Daymond; Greggs | Goldmark; Riprock 'n' Alex | 3:33 |
| 6. | "Summer of Love" | Topham; Twigg | Topham; Twigg; Waterman | 3:52 |
| 7. | "Better the Devil You Know" | Stock; Aitken; Waterman | Topham; Twigg; Waterman | 3:49 |
| 8. | "You'll Be Sorry" | Topham; Twigg | Topham; Twigg; Waterman | 4:06 |
| 9. | "Learn to Love Again" | Watkins; Frampton | Frampton | 3:27 |
| 10. | "Never Get Over You" | Scott-Lee; Hedges; Butler | Hedges | 3:55 |
| 11. | "Hand on Your Heart" | Richards; Frampton | Frampton | 4:03 |
| 12. | "Paradise Lost" | Topham; Twigg | Topham; Twigg; Waterman | 4:35 |
| 13. | "Turn Around" | Evans; Garvin; Paul | Stack | 3:24 |
| 14. | "If You Believe" | Tozer; Lauper; Pulsford; Irn | Porter | 3:52 |
| Total length: | | | | 52:21 |

Buzz – International edition (bonus tracks)
| No. | Title | Writer(s) | Producer(s) | Length |
|---|---|---|---|---|
| 15. | "Wouldn't Hurt So Bad" | Goldmark; Mueller | Goldmark; Bralower | 3:34 |
| 16. | "Human Touch" | Topham; Twigg | Topham; Twigg; Waterman | 4:00 |
| Total length: | | | | 59:55 |

Buzz – Japanese edition (bonus tracks)
| No. | Title | Writer(s) | Producer(s) | Length |
|---|---|---|---|---|
| 17. | "Stomp" (W.I.P. remix) | Topham; Twigg; Campbell; Rodgers; Edwards | Topham; Twigg; Waterman; W.I.P. (remix) | 6:08 |
| 18. | "5, 6, 7, 8" (instrumental) | Barry Upton; Steve Crosby | Topham; Twigg; Waterman | 2:54 |
| Total length: | | | | 68:57 |

Buzz – US edition
| No. | Title | Writer(s) | Producer(s) | Length |
|---|---|---|---|---|
| 1. | "Buzzz" | Goldmark; Mueller | Goldmark; Riprock 'n' Alex | 3:21 |
| 2. | "It's the Way You Make Me Feel" | Elofsson | Elofsson; David Kreuger | 3:17 |
| 3. | "Happy Go Lucky" | Goldmark; Daymond; Greggs | Goldmark; Riprock 'n' Alex | 3:33 |
| 4. | "Mars & Venus (We Fall in Love Again)" | Dane DeViller; Sean Hosein; Elofsson; Goldmark | DeViller; Hosein | 3:50 |
| 5. | "Stomp" | Topham; Twigg; Campbell | Topham; Twigg; Waterman | 3:22 |
| 6. | "Here and Now" | Carlsson; Thomson | Romdhane; Larossi | 3:45 |
| 7. | "Summer of Love" | Topham; Twigg | Topham; Twigg; Waterman | 3:52 |
| 8. | "Never Get Over You" | Scott-Lee; Hedges; Butler | Hedges | 3:55 |
| 9. | "Wouldn't Hurt So Bad" | Goldmark; Mueller | Goldmark; Bralower | 3:34 |
| 10. | "Learn to Love Again" | Watkins; Frampton | Frampton | 3:27 |
| 11. | "Hand on Your Heart" | Richards; Frampton | Frampton | 4:03 |
| Total length: | | | | 40:00 |

Note

- "Mars & Venus (We Fall in Love Again)" is only available on the US edition of Buzz and has been left unavailable in the UK, although a remixed form appeared on The Last Dance.

Sample credits

- "Stomp" contains a modified orchestral riff of the composition "Everybody Dance", written by Bernard Edwards and Nile Rodgers, performed by Chic.

== Personnel ==
- Lisa Scott-Lee – vocals, background vocals
- Faye Tozer – vocals, background vocals
- Lee Latchford-Evans – vocals, background vocals
- Ian "H" Watkins – vocals, background vocals
- Claire Richards – vocals, background vocals
- Patrik Andrén – keyboards
- Greg Bone – guitar
- Jimmy Bralower – arranger, producer, engineer, drum programming
- Nigel Butler – arranger
- Andy Caine – vocals (background)
- Rita Campbell – vocals (background)
- Mary Carewe – vocals (background)
- Andreas Carlsson – vocals (background)
- Chris DeStefano – bass, keyboards, engineer, drum programming
- Dave Deviller – guitar, programming, producer
- Tim Donovan – engineer
- Lance Ellington – vocals (background)
- Cyndi Lauper – vocals (background)
- Jörgen Elofsson – producer
- Mark Emmitt – mixing
- Andrew Frampton – arranger, producer
- Daniel Frampton – engineer, mixing
- Andy Goldmark – bass, arranger, keyboards, producer, drum programming
- Chaz Harper – mastering
- Simon Hill – drum programming
- Sean Hosein – programming, producer
- Nick Ingman – string arrangements, string conductor
- Henrik Janson – string conductor
- Ulf Jansson – string conductor
- David Krueger – producer
- Josef Larossi – arranger, producer, mixing, instrumentation
- Bernard Loor – mixing
- Gustave Lund – percussion
- Ernie McCone – bass
- Esbjörn Öhrwall – guitar
- Paula Oliveira – assistant engineer, mixing assistant
- Jeanette Olsson – vocals (background)
- Steve Price – engineer, mixing
- Mark "Ridders" Risdale – engineer
- Andreas "Quiz" Romdhane – arranger, producer, mixing, instrumentation
- Shane Stoneback – mixing assistant
- Mark Topham – bass, producer
- Karl Twigg – keyboards, producer
- T-Bone Wolk – guitar
- Hakan Wollgard – string engineer
- Richard Woodcraft – assistant engineer
- Gavyn Wright – violin

== Charts ==
| Chart (2000) | Peak position |
|---|---|
| Australian Albums (ARIA) | 112 |
| Belgian Albums (Ultratop Flanders) | 11 |
| European Albums Chart | 20 |
| Irish Albums (IRMA) | 23 |
| Japanese Albums (Oricon) | 53 |
| UK Albums (OCC) | 4 |

| Chart (2024) | Peak position |
|---|---|
| UK Vinyl Albums | 7 |

== Certifications ==
Certifications for Buzz
| Region | Certification | Certified units/sales |
|---|---|---|
| United Kingdom (BPI) | 2× Platinum | 600,000^{^} |
^{^} Shipments figures based on certification alone.

== Release history ==
Release history and formats for Buzz
| Country | Release date | Format | Label | Catalogue |
|---|---|---|---|---|
| United Kingdom | 30 October 2000 | Standard edition (CD) | Jive / EBUL | 920117-2 |
| United Kingdom | 30 October 2000 | Standard edition (cassette) | Jive / EBUL | 920117-4 |
| Australia | 16 July 2001 | Standard edition (CD + bonus tracks) | Zomba | 920128-2 |
| United States | 24 July 2001 | Standard edition (CD) | Zomba | 01241-41752-2 |
| Worldwide | 23 February 2024 | Vinyl | Zomba | |
