= It's the Way You Make Me Feel =

2001 single by Steps

Single by Steps

from the album Buzz
- B-side: "Too Busy Thinking About My Baby"; "In It for Love"
- Released: 1 January 2001
- Studio: Cheiron (Stockholm, Sweden)
- Length: 3:17
- Label: Jive; Ebul
- Songwriter: Jörgen Elofsson
- Producers: Jörgen Elofsson; David Kreuger

Steps singles chronology
"Stomp" (2000)	"It's the Way You Make Me Feel" (2001)	"Here and Now" / "You'll Be Sorry" (2001)

Music video
- "It's the Way You Make Me Feel" on YouTube

"It's the Way You Make Me Feel" is a song by British dance-pop group Steps, released as their 12th single on 1 January 2001. It is the second track to be released from their third album, Buzz, and peaked at number two on the UK Singles Chart. This was the first song the band performed following their official reformation in October 2011. One of the single's B-sides, a cover of Marvin Gaye's "Too Busy Thinking About My Baby", was taken from the Motown Mania compilation.

== Chart performance ==
This song debuted at number 72 on the UK Singles Chart on the final chart of 2000, as some record stores made the single available for purchase a week early. During that period, 1,400 sales were recorded. The following week, after it was properly released on New Year's Day 2001, the single set the record for the largest jump on the UK chart by leaping 70 places to number two, selling 53,400 copies. Steps held this record for eight years, until "Boys and Girls" by British singer Pixie Lott rose 72 places from number 73 to number one in September 2009. "It's the Way You Make Me Feel" stayed on the chart for nine more weeks and ended 2001 as the UK's 62nd-best-selling hit. Outside the UK, the track peaked at number eight in Ireland and number 32 in the Flanders region of Belgium.

== Music video ==
The music video for the song featured the band members and supporting actors/dancers reenacting scenes from the movie Dangerous Liaisons. Band members H and Lee took turns playing Valmont, while Claire, Faye and Lisa took interchanging turns as the characters of Merteuil, Tourvel and Cécile. The music video, including all internal and external shots, was shot at Brocket Hall near Welwyn Garden City in Hertfordshire.

== Track listings ==
UK CD and cassette single

1. "It's the Way You Make Me Feel" – 3:17
2. "Too Busy Thinking About My Baby" – 2:49
3. "In It for Love" – 3:23

European CD single

1. "It's the Way You Make Me Feel" – 3:17
2. "It's the Way You Make Me Feel" (Sleazesisters Anthem edit) – 3:25

European maxi-CD single

1. "It's the Way You Make Me Feel" – 3:17
2. "It's the Way You Make Me Feel" (Sleaze Sisters 12-inch Anthem mix) – 7:17
3. "It's the Way You Make Me Feel" (Sleaze Sisters Anthem edit) – 3:25
4. "In It for Love – 3:27

== Credits and personnel ==
=== A-side: "It's the Way You Make Me Feel" ===
Credits are adapted from the liner notes of Buzz.

Recording

- Recorded at Cheiron Studios (Stockholm, Sweden)
- Strings recorded at Polar Studios (Stockholm, Sweden)
- Mixed at Mono Studios (Stockholm, Sweden)
- Mastered at Transfermation (London, England)

Vocals

- Background vocals – Jeanette Olsson, Andreas Carlsson

Personnel

- Songwriting – Jörgen Elofsson
- Production – David Kreuger, Jörgen Elofsson
- Mixing Engineer – Bernard Löör
- Strings – Stockholm Session Strings
- String arrangement and conducting – Ulf & Henrik Jansson
- Keyboards – Patrik Andrën
- Guitar – Esbjörn Öhrwall
- Percussion – Gustave Lund

=== B-side: "Too Busy Thinking About My Baby" ===
Credits are adapted from the liner notes of "It's the Way You Make Me Feel".

Vocals

- Background vocals – Rita Campbell, Jia Frances, Lance Ellington

Personnel

- Songwriting – Norman Whitfield, Janie Bradford, Barrett Strong
- Production – Phil Nicholas, Lee Curle, Pete Waterman
- Mixing – Phil Nicholas, Lee Curle, Pete Waterman
- Engineer – Phil Nicholas, Lee Curle, Pete Waterman
- Keyboards – Karl Twigg
- Drums – Phil Nicholas
- Guitars – Greg Bone, Lee Curle
- Bass – Phil Nicholas, Lee Curle
- Piano – Phil Nicholas
- Lead violin – Gavyn Wright
- String arrangement – Simon Hale
- Conducting – Simon Hale

== Charts ==
=== Weekly charts ===
Chart (2001)	Peak position
Belgium (Ultratop 50 Flanders)	32
Europe (Eurochart Hot 100)	13
Ireland (IRMA)	8
Scottish Singles Sales (Official Charts)	3
Spain (Top 40 Radio)	38
UK Singles (Official Charts)	2
UK Indie (Official Charts)	1

=== Year-end charts ===
Chart (2001)	Position
UK Singles (OCC)	62

== Certifications ==
Region	Certification	Certified units/sales
United Kingdom (BPI)	Gold	400,000^{‡}
^{‡} Sales+streaming figures based on certification alone.
