= Stomp (Steps song) =

2000 single by Steps

Single by Steps

from the album Buzz
- B-side: "Tragedy" (W.I.P. Reception mix)
- Released: 16 October 2000
- Studio: PWL (Manchester, England)
- Genre: Eurodisco
- Length: 3:22
- Label: Jive; Ebul
- Songwriters: Mark Topham; Karl Twigg; Rita Campbell; Bernard Edwards; Nile Rodgers
- Producers: Mark Topham; Karl Twigg; Waterman

Steps singles chronology
"When I Said Goodbye" / "Summer of Love" (2000)	"Stomp" (2000)	"It's the Way You Make Me Feel" (2001)

Music video
- "Stomp" on YouTube

"Stomp" is a song by British pop group Steps, released as a single on 16 October 2000. The song features a modified orchestral riff from "Everybody Dance", released by Chic in 1978, but Bernard Edwards and Nile Rodgers did not receive songwriting credits until the release of Gold: Greatest Hits in 2001. "Stomp" was the group's second and final single to hit number one on the UK singles chart. The track was later released in Australia, Japan, and Europe.

== Music video ==
The video was filmed in Chiswick and features group members Lisa Scott-Lee and Ian "H" Watkins looking after a penthouse apartment while the owner Bill (Dave Legeno) is away on business.

== Track listings ==
UK CD single

1. "Stomp" – 3:22
2. "Stomp" (W.I.P. mix) – 6:08
3. "Tragedy" (W.I.P. Reception mix) – 6:57

UK cassette single

1. "Stomp" – 3:22
2. "Tragedy" (W.I.P. Reception mix) – 6:57

European CD single

1. "Stomp" – 3:22
2. "Stomp" (W.I.P. mix) – 6:08

Australian and New Zealand CD single

1. "Stomp" – 3:22
2. "Stomp" (W.I.P. mix) – 6:08
3. "Stomp" (Stomp'n mix) – 5:33
4. "Tragedy" (W.I.P. Reception mix) – 6:57

Japanese CD single

1. "Stomp" (album version) – 3:20
2. "Stomp" (W.I.P. mix) – 6:08
3. "Tragedy" (W.I.P. Reception mix) – 6:57
4. "Stomp" (Dance☆Man's Cosmic Funk mix) – 4:29

== Credits and personnel ==
Credits are adapted from the booklet of Buzz.

Recording

- Recorded at PWL Studios (Manchester, England)
- Mixed at PWL Studios (Manchester, England)
- Mastered at Transfermation Studios (London, England)

Vocals

- Background vocals – Rita Campbell, Andy Caine

Personnel

- Songwriting – Mark Topham, Karl Twigg, Rita Campbell
- Production – Mark Topham, Karl Twigg, Pete Waterman
- Mixing – Tim "Spag" Speight
- Engineer – Tim "Spag" Speight, Mark "Ridders" Risdale
- Assistant Engineers – Roe & Dan
- Keyboards – Karl Twigg
- Guitar – Greg Bone
- Bass – Ernie McCone, Mark Topham

== Charts ==
=== Weekly charts ===
Weekly chart performance for "Stomp"
Chart (2000–2001)	Peak position
Australia (ARIA)	62
Belgium (Ultratop 50 Flanders)	25
Europe (Eurochart Hot 100)	8
Ireland (IRMA)	17
Scotland Singles (OCC)	1
Spain (Top 40 Radio)	17
UK Singles (OCC)	1
UK Airplay (Music Week)	39
UK Indie (OCC)	2

=== Year-end charts ===
Year-end chart performance for "Stomp"
Chart (2000)	Position
UK Singles (OCC)	89

== Certifications ==
Certifications and sales for "Stomp"
Region	Certification	Certified units/sales
United Kingdom (BPI)	Silver	200,000^{‡}
^{‡} Sales+streaming figures based on certification alone.

== Release history ==
Release dates and formats for "Stomp"
Region	Date	Format(s)	Label(s)	Ref.
United Kingdom	16 October 2000	CD; cassette	Jive; Ebul	
Australia	5 March 2001	CD	Jive; Ebul	
Japan	4 April 2001	CD	Jive	

== See also ==
- List of UK Singles Chart number ones of the 2000s
