= Here and Now / You'll Be Sorry =

2001 single by Steps

"Here and Now" / "You'll Be Sorry"

Single by Steps

from the album Buzz
- B-side: "Just Like the First Time"
- Released: 4 June 2001
- Studio: Soundtrade, QuizLarossi (Stockholm, Sweden) ("Here and Now"); PWL (London, England) ("You'll Be Sorry")
- Length: 3:28 ("Here and Now"); 3:38 ("You'll Be Sorry")
- Label: Jive; Ebul
- Songwriters: Andreas Carlsson, Ali Thomson ("Here and Now"); Mark Topham, Karl Twigg ("You'll Be Sorry")
- Producers: Andreas "Quiz" Romdhane, Josef Larossi ("Here and Now"); Mark Topham, Karl Twigg, Pete Waterman ("You'll Be Sorry")

Steps singles chronology
"It's the Way You Make Me Feel" (2001)	"Here and Now" / "You'll Be Sorry" (2001)	"Chain Reaction" (2001)

Music videos
- "Here and Now" on YouTube; "You'll Be Sorry" on YouTube

Alternative cover
- CD2 cover

"Here and Now" and "You'll Be Sorry" are two songs by British pop group Steps from their third studio album, Buzz (2000). Released as a double-A side single on 4 June 2001, the songs served as the third and final single from the album. The single reached number four in the United Kingdom and number 23 in Ireland. Both songs were remixed for their single release, with the official titles of the Q-Street mix (also called the Soundtrade Mix) and The Pardon mix, which is similar to the album version but with a hard ending instead of a fade out.

== Chart performance ==
Although widely advertised as being released on 28 May 2001, the single was pushed back and released on 4 June 2001. The double A-side debuted and peaked at number four on the UK singles chart and spent 10 weeks in the top 75. Despite its chart success, it ended up as one of Steps' lowest-selling singles.

== Music video ==
The concept was notable for the fact that the videos for the two songs linked together. The video for "Here And Now" features the group making their way through a maze, until they reach the centre and perform the song's dance routine. At the end of the song, the centre of the maze morphs into a spaceship which then flies off.

The video for "You'll Be Sorry" takes place aboard the spaceship. A competition was held through the official Steps website for fans to be filmed and appear in the video for "You'll Be Sorry", which was recorded in Acton, London. The 30-some competition winners were filmed dancing around the centre stage whilst Steps performed their dance routine to the chorus of the song. However, none of the footage made it to the final cut, disappointing the competition winners.

In May 2022, the raw footage from the "You'll Be Sorry" video shoot was released on Steps' official YouTube channel showing the footage of the competition winners officially for the first time in 21 years. Co-director Marek Losey explained in an interview on the same channel that the footage was ultimately not included due to time pressure. There was to have been additional footage of the fans entering the video set, but it was not shot.

== Track listings ==
UK CD1

1. "Here and Now" (Q-Street mix)
2. "Here and Now" (Sleazesisters Anthem mix)
3. "You'll Be Sorry" (W.I.P. Bach to Classics mix)

UK CD2

1. "You'll Be Sorry" (The Pardon mix)
2. "Here and Now" (Almighty mix)
3. "Just Like the First Time"

UK cassette single

1. "Here and Now" (Q-Street mix)
2. "You'll Be Sorry" (The Pardon mix)
3. "Here and Now" (Almighty mix)

Australian and New Zealand CD single

1. "Here and Now" (Soundtrade mix)
2. "Here and Now" (Sleazesisters Anthem mix)
3. "Here and Now" (Almighty mix)
4. "You'll Be Sorry" (The Pardon mix)
5. "You'll Be Sorry" (W.I.P. Bach to Classics mix)
6. "Just Like the First Time"

== Credits and personnel ==
Credits are adapted from the Buzz album boooklet.

=== "Here and Now" ===
Recording

- Recorded at Soundtrade Studio and QuizLarossi Studio (Stockholm, Sweden)
- Mixed at R.O.A.M. Studio (Stockholm, Sweden)
- Mastered at Transfermation (London, England)

Vocals

- Additional background vocals – Anders von Hofsten, Andreas Carlsson

Personnel

- Songwriting – Andreas Carlsson, Ali Thomson
- Production – Andreas "Quiz" Romdhane & Josef Larossi
- Mixing – Andreas "Quiz" Romdhane & Josef Larossi
- Arrangement – Andreas "Quiz" Romdhane & Josef Larossi
- Guitars – Esbjörn Öhrwall
- All other instruments – Quiz & Larossi

=== "You'll Be Sorry" ===
Recording

- Recorded at PWL Studios (London, England)
- Mixed at PWL Studios (London, England)
- Mastered at Transfermation (London, England)

Vocals

- Background vocals – Rita Campbell, Mary Carewe, Lance Ellington, Andy Caine

Personnel

- Songwriting – Mark Topham, Karl Twigg
- Production – Mark Topham, Karl Twigg, Pete Waterman
- Mixing – Tim "Spag" Speight
- Engineering – Tim "Spag" Speight, Mark "Ridders" Risdale
- Engineering assistance – Roe & Dan
- Guitars – Mark Topham
- Keyboards – Karl Twigg

== Charts ==
=== Weekly charts ===
Chart (2001)	Peak position
Australia (ARIA)	71
Europe (Eurochart Hot 100)	19
Ireland (IRMA)	23
Scotland Singles (OCC)	2
UK Singles (OCC)	4
UK Indie (OCC)	2

=== Year-end charts ===
Chart (2001)	Position
UK Singles (OCC)	114

== Release history ==
Region	Date	Format(s)	Label(s)	Ref(s).
United Kingdom	4 June 2001	CD; cassette	Jive; Ebul	
Australia	16 July 2001	CD	Jive; Ebul	
