= Steps discography =

- Studio albums: 7
- Extended plays: 3
- Live albums: 5
- Compilation albums: 9
- Singles: 38
- Video albums: 9
- Music videos: 100

The discography of UK dance-pop group Steps, contains seven studio albums, nine compilation albums, three EPs, five live albums, nine video albums, two remix albums, two boxsets, a hundred music videos and thirty-eight singles.

Steps' debut single, "5,6,7,8" was released in 1997 and reached number fourteen on the UK Singles Chart and the track remains one of the highest selling singles never to reach the top 10 on the UK chart. Second single "Last Thing on My Mind" became their first UK top ten peaking at number six. "One for Sorrow", the next single, peaked at number two and was followed by their debut album, Step One, which debuted and peaked at number two on the UK Albums Chart and went on to become certified 5× Platinum by the British Phonographic Industry (BPI). The next single release was a double A-side "Heartbeat"/"Tragedy" released in November 1998 and peaked at number one in January 1999. The success of "Heartbeat"/"Tragedy" led to the release of the group's next single, "Better Best Forgotten" to be delayed by almost two months, but then peaked at number two. In July 1999, Steps released the first single from their next album, "Love's Got a Hold on My Heart" which was another number two hit in the UK. The group then released their second album, Steptacular, which peaked at number one and was eventually certified 4× Platinum. The group's follow-up singles "After the Love Has Gone", "Say You'll Be Mine"/"Better the Devil You Know", "Deeper Shade of Blue" and "When I Said Goodbye"/"Summer of Love" continued their top five run. In October 2000, Steps released their third album Buzz, reaching number 4 in the UK charts and being certified double platinum. Its lead single was "Stomp", their second number one single. The following single "It's the Way You Make Me Feel", reached number two and "Here and Now"/"You'll Be Sorry" peaked at number four.

The group then released a greatest hits album in 2001. "Chain Reaction", a cover of the popular Diana Ross song, was released as the first single from Gold: Greatest Hits and was another UK number two. The second single, "Words Are Not Enough"/"I Know Him So Well", was another top five hit and became the final single from the group. They announced their split on Boxing Day 2001. The group's record company, Jive Records released a remix and B-side compilation in 2002, The Last Dance, which featured remixes of previous tracks. This album peaked at number fifty-seven in the UK. Steps reformed in May 2011 and released The Ultimate Collection in October. It debuted at number one in the UK. A box set, The Platinum Collection was set to be released on 28 November 2011; however, it was postponed to 13 February 2012. On 30 April 2012, The Ultimate Collection: Tour Edition was released. It features two discs, with the additional disc featuring the songs in karaoke style. All the songs apart from "Chain Reaction" and "I Know Him So Well" feature a backing track sung by Faye, Lisa, Claire, H and Lee. Also in April, a live album called Steps: Live! 2012 was released as part of the group's 2012 tour. It was only available to purchase at venues where the group performed. All of the songs performed are on the live album. The official video for "Light Up the World" is the Lyric Video. The group reformed on 1 January 2017 and released their fifth album Tears on the Dancefloor on 21 April 2017, which debuted and peaked at number two on the UK Albums Chart. "Scared of the Dark" was released as the first single and peaked at number thirty-seven.

Steps' sixth studio album What the Future Holds was released on 27 November 2020. It was preceded by two singles. The band released their seventh studio album quickly in September 2021, What the Future Holds Pt. 2. Both studio albums debuted at number 2 in the UK charts. In May 2022, it was announced that Steps would be releasing their third greatest hits compilation, titled Platinum Collection. The album was released on 19 August 2022.

== Albums ==
=== Studio albums ===
List of albums, with selected chart positions and certifications
Title	Album details	Peak chart positions									Sales	Certifications
Title	Album details	UK	AUS	BEL (Fla)	IRE	JPN	NLD	NZ	SWE	US	Sales	Certifications
Step One	Released: 11 September 1998; Label: Jive (#0519112); Formats: CD, cassette, Vinyl	2	5	1	8	19	33	6	46	79	WW: 2,500,000; UK: 1,405,470	BPI: 5× Platinum; ARIA: Platinum; BEA: 2× Platinum; RIAJ: Gold; RMNZ: Platinum
Steptacular	Released: 25 October 1999; Label: Jive (#0519442); Formats: CD, cassette, Vinyl	1	25	2	11	25	46	—	—	—	UK: 1,292,466	BPI: 4× Platinum; BEA: Platinum
Buzz	Released: 25 October 2000; Label: Jive (#9201172); Formats: CD, cassette, Vinyl	4	112	11	23	53	—	—	—	—	UK: 705,390	BPI: 2× Platinum
Light Up the World	Released: 12 November 2012; Label: Warner Music; Formats: CD, digital download	32	—	—	—	—	—	—	—	—	UK: 20,315	
Tears on the Dancefloor	Released: 21 April 2017; Label: Absolute; Formats: Vinyl, CD, digital download	2	46	20	10	—	—	— (Note: Tears on the Dancefloor did not enter the NZ Top 40 Albums Chart, but peaked at number ten on the NZ Heatseeker Albums Chart.)	—	—	UK: 110,711	BPI: Gold
What the Future Holds	Released: 27 November 2020; Label: BMG; Formats: Vinyl, box set, cassette, CD, digital download, streaming	2	26	59	26	—	—	—	—	—	UK: 70,000	BPI: Silver
What the Future Holds Pt. 2	Released: 10 September 2021; Label: BMG; Formats: Vinyl, box set, cassette, CD, digital download, streaming	2	11	99	22	—	—	—	—	—		
"—" denotes album that did not chart or was not released

=== Compilation albums ===
Title	Album details	Peak chart positions					Sales	Certifications
Title	Album details	UK	AUS	IRE	SCO	NZ	Sales	Certifications
Gold: Greatest Hits	Released: 15 October 2001; Label: Jive (#9201412); Formats: CD, cassette	1	155	1	—	17	UK: 1,131,168	BPI: 4× Platinum
The Last Dance	Released: 25 November 2002; Label: Jive (#9201522); Formats: CD, cassette	57	—	—	—	—		BPI: Gold
Best of Steps	Released: 25 November 2002/January 2003; Label: Jive (#9201522); Formats: CD, cassette	—	—	—	—	—		
The Songs of Steps (instrumental)	Released: 2005; Label: Startrax (#B00005ATMT); Format: CD	—	—	—	—	—		
The Ultimate Collection	Released: 10 October 2011/27 April 2012; Label: Sony; Formats: CD, digital download	1	—	13	1	—	UK: 300,000	BPI: Platinum
The Platinum Collection	Released: 13 February 2012; Label: Sony; Format: CD	—	—	—	—	—		
5,6,7,8: The Collection	Released: 27 November 2015; Label: Music Club Deluxe; Format: CD	—	—	—	—	—		
The Collection†	Released: 25 March 2016; Label: Sony; Format: Digital download	—	—	—	—	—		
Platinum Collection	Released: 19 August 2022; Label: Sony; Format: CD, digital download, LP, cassette	1	78	13	1	—	UK: 60,000	BPI: Silver
"—" denotes album that did not chart or was not released
A † denotes album that has been slightly altered for digital download and is related to another release

=== Box set ===
Title	Album details
Gold: Greatest Hits Value Pack	Released: 15 October 2001; Label: Jive (#9201412); Formats: CD, VCD
Tears on the Dancefloor: The Singles Collection	Released: 27 July 2018; Label: Absolute; Format: CD, digital download, streaming

=== Live albums ===
Title	Album details	Peak chart positions
Title	Album details	UK
The Next Steps Live	Released: 29 November 1999; Label: Jive; Formats: CD, digital download	—
The End Of The Road	Released: 2002; Label: Jive; Formats: CD, digital download	—
Live! 2012	Released: 2 July 2012; Label: Concert Live; Formats: CD, digital download	—
Party on the Dancefloor : Live From Belfast & Live At Wembley	Released: 8 June 2018; Label: LiveHereNow; Formats: CD, digital download, streaming	18
What the Future Holds Live	Released: 12 September 2022; Label: LiveHereNow; Formats: 2×CD, Blu-ray, DVD, digital download, streaming	—

=== Remix albums ===
Title	Album details	Peak chart positions
Title	Album details	UK
Stomp All Night – The Remix Anthology	Released: 20 May 2016; Label: Edsel; Format: 3×CD	175
25 Years of Steps (Revisted Mixes)	Released: 19 August 2022; Label: Sony; Format: digital download, streaming	—

=== Reissues ===
Title	Album details	Peak chart positions
Title	Album details	UK
Step One/Steptacular Reissue	Released: 2007; Label: BMG; Format: CD, digital download	_
Tears on the Dancefloor: Crying at the Disco	Released: 27 October 2017; Label: Absolute; Format: CD, digital download, streaming	8

== Extended plays ==
Title	Details
Say You'll Be Mine – Hit Singles	Released: 23 Mar 2000 (Japan only); Label: Avex Inc.; Format: CD
Just Like The First Time	Released: 2002 (Promo only); Label: Jive; Format: CD, Vinyl
Story of a Heart Remixes	Released: 12 May 2017; Label: Absolute; Format: Digital download

== Singles ==
List of singles, with chart positions and certifications, showing year released and album name
Title	Year	Peak chart positions										Certifications	Album
Title	Year	UK	UK Digital	AUS	BEL (Fla)	FRA	IRE	NLD	NZ	SWE	US Dance	Certifications	Album
"5,6,7,8"	1997	14	—	1	2	—	—	27	2	17	—	BPI: Platinum; ARIA: Platinum; BEA: Gold; RMNZ: Gold	Step One
"Last Thing on My Mind"	1998	6	—	5	1	30	11	13	24	59	—	BPI: Gold; ARIA: Platinum; BEA: Platinum	Step One
"One for Sorrow"	1998	2	—	34	1	—	4	28	13	34	38	BPI: Gold; BEA: Gold	Step One
"Heartbeat" / "Tragedy"	1998	1	—	10	8	—	2	24	1	4	—	BPI: 2× Platinum; GLF: Gold; RMNZ: Platinum	Step One / Steptacular
"Better Best Forgotten"	1999	2	—	—	20	—	8	77	—	—	—	BPI: Gold	Step One
"Love's Got a Hold on My Heart"	1999	2	—	29	14	—	9	58	18	—	—	BPI: Silver	Steptacular
"After the Love Has Gone"	1999	5	—	47	13	—	18	63	—	—	—	BPI: Silver	Steptacular
"Say You'll Be Mine" / "Better the Devil You Know"	1999	4	—	21	42	—	13	47	—	—	—	BPI: Gold	Steptacular / Buzz
"Deeper Shade of Blue"	2000	4	—	—	36	—	24	—	—	—	—	BPI: Silver	Steptacular
"When I Said Goodbye" / "Summer of Love"	2000	5	—	—	—	—	18	—	—	—	—		Steptacular / Buzz
"Stomp"	2000	1	—	62	25	—	17	—	—	—	—	BPI: Silver	Buzz
"It's the Way You Make Me Feel"	2001	2	—	—	32	—	8	—	—	—	—	BPI: Silver	Buzz
"Here and Now" / "You'll Be Sorry"	2001	4	—	71	—	—	23	—	—	—	—		Buzz
"Chain Reaction"	2001	2	—	41	—	—	8	—	—	—	—	BPI: Silver	Gold: Greatest Hits
"Words Are Not Enough" / "I Know Him So Well"	2001	5	—	—	—	—	21	—	—	—	—		Gold: Greatest Hits
"Light Up the World"	2012	82	—	—	—	—	—	—	—	—	—		Light Up the World
"Scared of the Dark"	2017	37	7	—	—	—	—	—	—	—	—	BPI: Silver	Tears on the Dancefloor
"Story of a Heart"	2017	173	69	—	—	—	—	—	—	—	—		Tears on the Dancefloor
"Neon Blue"	2017	—	—	—	—	—	—	—	—	—	—		Tears on the Dancefloor
"Dancing with a Broken Heart"	2017	— (Note: "Dancing with a Broken Heart" did not enter the UK Singles Chart; it peaked at number 58 on the UK Singles Sales Chart.)	58	—	—	—	—	—	—	—	—		Tears on the Dancefloor
"What the Future Holds"	2020	— (Note: "What the Future Holds" did not enter the UK Singles Chart; it peaked at number 10 on the UK Singles Sales Chart.)	10	—	—	—	—	—	—	—	—		What the Future Holds
"Something in Your Eyes"	2020	— (Note: "Something In Your Eyes" did not enter the UK Singles Chart; it peaked at number 22 on the UK Singles Sales Chart.)	21	—	—	—	—	—	—	—	—		What the Future Holds
"To the Beat of My Heart"	2021	— (Note: "To the Beat of My Heart" did not enter the UK Singles Chart; it peaked at number 34 on the UK Singles Sales Chart.)	33	—	—	—	—	—	—	—	—		What the Future Holds
"Heartbreak in This City" (with Michelle Visage)	2021	—	15	—	—	—	—	—	—	—	—		What the Future Holds Pt. 2
"Take Me for a Ride"	2021	— (Note: "Take Me for a Ride" did not enter the UK Singles Chart; it peaked at number 29 on the UK Singles Sales Chart.)	27	—	—	—	—	—	—	—	—		What the Future Holds Pt. 2
"The Slightest Touch"	2021	— (Note: "The Slightest Touch" did not enter the UK Singles Chart; it peaked at number nine on the UK Singles Sales Chart.)	9	—	—	—	—	—	—	—	—		What the Future Holds Pt. 2
"A Hundred Years of Winter"	2021	—	98	—	—	—	—	—	—	—	—		What the Future Holds Pt. 2
"Platinum Megamix"	2022	— (Note: "Platinum Megamix" did not enter the UK Singles Chart; it peaked at number 15 on the UK Singles Sales Chart.)	15	—	—	—	—	—	—	—	—		Non-album single
"Hard 2 Forget"	2022	— (Note: "Hard 2 Forget" did not enter the UK Singles Chart; it peaked at number 22 on the UK Singles Sales Chart.)	21	—	—	—	—	—	—	—	—		Platinum Collection

=== As featured artist ===
Title	Year	Peak chart positions							Certifications	Album
Title	Year	UK	AUS	BEL (Fla)	IRE	NLD	NZ	SWE	Certifications	Album
"Thank ABBA for the Music" (Steps, Cleopatra, Tina Cousins, Billie Piper & B*Witched)	1999	4	9	23	5	14	6	8	BPI: Silver; ARIA: Platinum	ABBAmania

=== Other charted songs ===
Title	Year	Peak chart positions	Album
Title	Year	UK Digital	Album
"The Runner"	2022	56	Platinum Collection

== Video albums ==
Year	Details
1998	Steps: The Video: Released: 30 November 1998; Formats: VCD, VHS
1999	The Next Step Live: Released: 29 November 1999; Formats: VCD, VHS
2000	live@wembley.2000: Released: 30 October 2000; Formats: VCD, VHS
2001	Gold: Greatest Hits: Released: 15 October 2001; Formats: DVD, VCD, VHS
2002	The End of the Road : Live Gold Tour: Released: 25 November 2002; Formats: DVD, VCD, VHS
2011	The Ultimate Collection: Released: 10 October 2011; Formats: DVD
2012	The Ultimate Tour Live: Released: 29 October 2012; Formats: DVD, Blu-ray
2018	Party on the Dancefloor: Live from the SSE Arena Wembley: Released: 8 June 2018; Formats: DVD, Blu-ray, Photobook
2022	What the Future Holds Live : Live from the O2 London: Released: 12 September 2022; Formats: DVD, Blu-ray, Photobook

== Music videos ==
Song	Year	Director
"5, 6, 7, 8"	1997	Phil Griffin
"Last Thing on My Mind"	1998	Phil Griffin
"One for Sorrow"	1998	David Amphlett
"Heartbeat"	1998	David Amphlett
"Tragedy"	1998	David Amphlett
"Love You More"	1998	Vicky Blood
"Too Weak to Resist"	1998	Vicky Blood
"To Be Your Hero"	1998	Promo video from Step One Tour
"Especially for You" (with Denise van Outen and Johnny Vaughan)	1998	Music video on MTV
"Better Best Forgotten"	1999	David Amphlett
"Thank ABBA for the Music"	1999	Live performance from the 1999 Brit Awards
"Lay All Your Love On Me"	1999	Live performance from the 1999 ABBAmania Concert
"Dancing Queen"	1999	Live performance from the 1999 ABBAmania Concert
"To Be Your Hero"	1999	Premiere Steptacular at Gaytime TV
"Love's Got a Hold on My Heart"	1999	Dani Jacobs
"After the Love Has Gone"	1999	Camerson Casey & Simon Brand
"One for Sorrow" (US version/Tony Moran Remix)	1999	Gustavo Garzon
"Say You'll Be Mine"	1999	David Amphlett
"Better the Devil You Know" (live)	1999	Julie Knowles
"Disney Concert Megamix" (live)	1999	Disney Concert
"Never Say Never Again" (Radio Edit)	1999	BTS Video
"12 Days of Christmas" (featuring other artists)	1999	SMTV Video
"Deeper Shade of Blue"	2000	The New Renaissance
"When I Said Goodbye"	2000	Simon Brand
"Summer of Love"	2000	Terence O'Connor & Marek Losey
"Stomp"	2000	David Amphlett
"It's the Way You Make Me Feel"	2000	David Amphlett
"Too Busy Thinking About My Baby"	2000	Live performance from Motown Mania
"Merry Xmas Everybody"	2000	Live & Kicking
"Here and Now"	2001	Terence O'Connor & Marek Losey
"You'll Be Sorry"	2001	Terence O'Connor & Marek Losey
"Gold Medley"	2001	Promo video from CD UK
"Chain Reaction"	2001	Patrick Kiely
"Words Are Not Enough"	2001	Aron Baxter, Thrain Shadbolt
"I Know Him So Well"	2001	Live performance from ABBAmania
"Arena Medley"	2001	Live performance during the Gold Tour
"Baby Don't Dance"	2002	Live performance during the Gold Tour
"W.I.P Megamix" (MTV & remastered version)	2002	N/A
"Overture"	2002	Promo video from Sky Box Office Tour
"Close to Me"	2003	Live performance during the Gold Tour
"If You Believe"	2006	Live performance of Faye Tozer
"Dancing Queen"	2011	Homemade Video
"Light Up the World"	2012	Live performance from This Morning
"Light Up The World" (Lyric Video & TV Ad)	2012	N/A
"It May Be Cold Outside"	2012	N/A
"Light Up the World" (7th Heaven Mix)	2012	Promo video for Light Up the World
"Better Best Forgotten" (acoustic Christmas version)	2012	Live performance from Christmas with Steps Tour
"Scared of the Dark"	2017	Howard Greenhalgh
"Story of a Heart"	2017	James Dove
"Neon Blue"	2017	Edward T. Cooke
"Dancing with a Broken Heart"	2017	Charles Henri Belleville
"Story of a Heart" (7th Heaven Mix)	2017	James Dove
"Neon Blue" (7th Heaven Radio Mix)	2017	Edward T. Cooke
"Scared of the Dark" (BTS version)	2017	Howard Greenhalgh
"What the Future Holds"	2020	Max Giwa / Dania Pasquini
"Something in Your Eyes"	2020	Carly Cussen
"What the Future Holds" (Cahill Mix)	2020	Max Giwa / Dania Pasquini
"Something in Your Eyes" (Dancebreak & 7th Heaven Mix)	2020	Carly Cussen
"To The Beat of My Heart"	2021	Harold Strachan
"Heartbreak in This City"	2021	Harold Strachan
"Take Me for a Ride"	2021	Jordan Rossi
"The Slightest Touch"	2021	Backstage Visualiser
"Take Me for a Ride" (7th Heaven Mix)	2021	Jordan Rossi
"The Slightest Touch" (Al Remastered 16:9 Version)	2021	Backstage Party Visualizer
"Something in Your Eyes"	2021	Night In Performance
"Under My Skin"	2021	Night In Performance
"What the Future Holds"	2021	Night In Performance
"A Hundred Years of Winter"	2021	N/A
"Platinum Megamix"	2022	N/A
"Hard 2 Forget"	2022	N/A
"It's the Way You Make Me Feel" (BTS version)	2022	David Amphlett
"Stomp" (Dancebreak)	2022	David Amphlett
"The Baby Steps Photo Album" (released as a video)	2022	Taken from Steps : The Video
"You'll Be Sorry" (BTS Version)	2022	Terence O'Connor & Marek Losey
"One for Sorrow" (25 Revisited Mix)	2022	David Amphlett
"Tragedy" (25 Revisited Mix)	2022	David Amphlett
"Love's Got a Hold on My Heart"(Dancebreak & Sing A-Long)	2022	Dani Jacobs
"Deeper Shade of Blue" (Dancebreak)	2022	The New Renaissance
"When I Said Goodbye" (Colour Version)	2022	Simon Brand
"Here and Now" (Dancebreak)	2022	Terence O'Connor & Marek Losey
"Take Me for a Ride" (7th Heaven Mix with Extended Intro)	2022	Jordan Rossi
"The Runner" (Lyric Video)	2022	N/A
"Hard 2 Forget" (Lyric Video)	2022	N/A
"Megamix" (live)	2022	Live performance from The Big Jubilee Street Party
"60's Medley"	2022	Promo video for What The Future Holds Tour
"Deeper Shade of Blue" (25 Revisited Mix)	2024	The New Renaissance

== Other appearances ==
Year	Title	Album
1998	"Especially for You" (with Denise van Outen and Johnny Vaughan)	Non-album song
1998	"Steps Open Ended Interview" (promo issue)	Promo interview CD
1998	"Steps Interview" (promo issue & biography CD)	Promo interview & Biography CD
1999	"Lay All Your Love on Me"	ABBAmania
1999	"Step One Tour Show Special"	Planet Steps
2000	"Too Busy Thinking About My Baby"	Motown Mania
2000	"Merry X-Mas Everybody"	Platinum Christmas
2000	"Steps Interview" (promo issue for radio stations)	Promo interview CD
2001	"Happy Go Lucky"	The Princess Diaries
2001	"Mars & Venus (We Fall In Love Again)"	Buzz (US Edition)
2001	"W.I.P Megamix"	Gold (Digital Edition)
