= The Ultimate Collection (Steps album) =

Greatest hits album by Steps
- Released: 10 October 2011
- Recorded: 1997–2011
- Genre: Pop
- Length: 76:16
- Label: Sony
- Producer: Mark Topham; Karl Twigg; Pete Waterman; Dan Frampton; David Kreuger; Jörgen Elofsson; Andreas "Quiz" Romdhane; Ali Thomson; Eliot Kennedy

Steps chronology
The Last Dance (2002)	The Ultimate Collection (2011)	Live! 2012 (2012)

Alternative cover
- Tour Edition cover

The Ultimate Collection is the second greatest hits album released by pop group Steps. The album was released on 10 October 2011 through Sony Music Entertainment. The album was released to mark the tenth anniversary of the group's split back in 2001 alongside the groups reformation. The album features Steps' first recording in ten years, a cover of the ABBA hit "Dancing Queen".

The album debuted at number one in the United Kingdom selling 34,000 copies within its first week. On 22 July 2013, the album was certified Gold by the British Phonographic Industry selling over 100,000 copies in the United Kingdom. The album was certified platinum for sales over 300,000 on 13 March 2020.

== Background and release ==
In 2011, Steps appeared on the Sky Living documentary Steps Reunion depicting their split and the interim years leading them to bury old wounds and reunite for their second greatest hits album The Ultimate Collection. It marked ten years since the group released their first greatest hits album Gold: Greatest Hits and was Steps' first release since the release of their 2002 compilation, The Last Dance. On 10 October 2011, Steps appeared for the first time on This Morning, performing "It's the Way You Make Me Feel" and "Tragedy" and announced their 14-date 2012 arena tour The Ultimate Tour. They also announced that they had reformed as a band full term.

The track listing places the singles in chronological order and is similar to the 2001 Gold: Greatest Hits compilation. However, The Ultimate Collection includes the singles "I Know Him So Well" and "You'll Be Sorry", not featured on Gold but excludes the single "Words Are Not Enough" (although the music video is included on the DVD edition). The release features a version of ABBA's "Dancing Queen" featured as a bonus track. The deluxe edition of the album includes a DVD containing all of Steps' music videos and a live recording of "I Know Him So Well" from the Abbamania TV Special. The standard version of the album featured a black cover while the deluxe edition has a white cover and both have a cardboard sleeve surrounding the jewel case. Steps have signed the booklets on both CD and deluxe editions.

The Ultimate Collection: Tour Edition was released on 27 April 2012 to coincide with their first arena tour in ten years since their Gold Tour. The release includes a bonus disc of karaoke versions of the singles.

== Tour ==
During the Steps Reunion TV show, plans for a tour started to develop, with each member of the group having mixed feelings about whether or not to release tickets. They sold out all of their initial dates which led to adding more dates. The group filmed another TV documentary entitled Steps: On The Road Again, which followed the group on tour and showed the issues they faced whilst touring together as a band.

== Commercial performance ==
On 16 October 2011, the album debuted at number one in the United Kingdom and Scotland selling 34,000 copies within its first week. The album also charted at number thirteen in Ireland. In its second and third week the album charted at numbers three and nine, respectively. The album spent a total of 16 weeks on the chart leaving at number seventy-seven on 29 January 2012. The album re-entered the chart at number sixty-four on 29 April 2012 and remained in the chart for another six weeks before leaving the chart at number seventy-six on 3 June 2012. The album was certified Gold in the United Kingdom by the British Phonographic Industry on 22 July 2013. It was then certified Platinum by the BPI on 13 March 2020.

Following their return for their 20th anniversary, the album entered the chart at number fifty-one on 17 March 2017.

== Track listing ==
Standard
No.	Title	Writer(s)	Length
1.	"5,6,7,8" (from Step One)	Barry Upton; Steve Crosby	3:21
2.	"Last Thing on My Mind" (from Step One)	Mike Stock; Pete Waterman; Sara Dallin; Keren Woodward	3:04
3.	"One for Sorrow" (from Step One)	Mark Topham; Karl Twigg; Lance Ellington	4:21
4.	"Heartbeat" (from Step One)	Jackie James	4:23
5.	"Tragedy" (from Steptacular)	Barry Gibb; Robin Gibb; Maurice Gibb	4:30
6.	"Better Best Forgotten" (Radio edit, from Step One)	Mike Stock; Matt Aitken; Waterman	3:42
7.	"Love's Got a Hold on My Heart" (from Steptacular)	Frampton; Waterman	3:19
8.	"After the Love Has Gone" (from Steptacular)	Topham; Twigg; Ellington	4:34
9.	"Say You'll Be Mine" (from Steptacular)	Frampton; Waterman	3:31
10.	"Better the Devil You Know" (from Buzz)	Stock; Aitken; Waterman	3:48
11.	"Deeper Shade of Blue" (Radio edit, from Steptacular)	Topham; Twigg	3:45
12.	"When I Said Goodbye" (from Steptacular)	Topham; Twigg	3:32
13.	"Summer of Love" (from Buzz)	Topham; Twigg	3:52
14.	"Stomp" (from Buzz)	Topham; Twigg; Rita Campbell	3:22
15.	"It's the Way You Make Me Feel" (from Buzz)	Jörgen Elofsson	3:18
16.	"Here And Now" (from Buzz)	Andreas Carlsson; Ali Thomson	3:26
17.	"You'll Be Sorry" (from Buzz)	Topham; Twigg	3:44
18.	"Chain Reaction" (from Gold: Greatest Hits)	Barry Gibb; Robin Gibb; Maurice Gibb	3:56
19.	"I Know Him So Well" (from The Last Dance)	Benny Andersson; Tim Rice; Björn Ulvaeus	4:15
20.	"Dancing Queen" (bonus track)	Benny Andersson; Björn Ulvaeus; Stig Anderson	3:25
Total length:			76:16

Deluxe Edition — DVD
No.	Title	Length
1.	"5,6,7,8"
2.	"Last Thing on My Mind"
3.	"One for Sorrow"
4.	"Heartbeat"
5.	"Tragedy"
6.	"Better Best Forgotten"
7.	"Love's Got a Hold on My Heart"
8.	"After the Love Has Gone"
9.	"Say You'll Be Mine"
10.	"Better the Devil You Know"
11.	"Deeper Shade of Blue"
12.	"When I Said Goodbye"
13.	"Summer of Love"
14.	"Stomp"
15.	"It's the Way You Make Me Feel"
16.	"Here And Now"
17.	"You'll Be Sorry"
18.	"Chain Reaction"
19.	"Words Are Not Enough"
20.	"I Know Him So Well"

Tour Edition — CD1
No.	Title	Length
1.	"5,6,7,8"	3:21
2.	"Last Thing on My Mind"	3:04
3.	"One for Sorrow"	4:21
4.	"Heartbeat"	4:23
5.	"Tragedy"	4:30
6.	"Better Best Forgotten (Radio Edit))"	3:42
7.	"Love's Got a Hold on My Heart"	3:19
8.	"After the Love Has Gone"	4:34
9.	"Say You'll Be Mine"	3:31
10.	"Better the Devil You Know"	3:48
11.	"Deeper Shade of Blue (Radio Edit))"	3:45
12.	"When I Said Goodbye"	3:32
13.	"Summer of Love"	3:52
14.	"Stomp"	3:22
15.	"It's the Way You Make Me Feel"	3:18
16.	"Here And Now"	3:26
17.	"You'll Be Sorry"	3:44
18.	"Chain Reaction"	3:56
19.	"I Know Him So Well"	4:15
20.	"Dancing Queen"	3:25
Total length:		76:16

Tour Edition — CD2 Karaoke
No.	Title	Length
1.	"5,6,7,8"
2.	"Last Thing on My Mind"
3.	"One for Sorrow"
4.	"Heartbeat"
5.	"Tragedy"
6.	"Better Best Forgotten"
7.	"Love's Got a Hold on My Heart"
8.	"After the Love Has Gone"
9.	"Say You'll Be Mine"
10.	"Better the Devil You Know"
11.	"Deeper Shade of Blue"
12.	"When I Said Goodbye"
13.	"Summer of Love"
14.	"Stomp"
15.	"It's the Way You Make Me Feel"
16.	"Here And Now"
17.	"You'll Be Sorry"
18.	"Chain Reaction"
19.	"I Know Him So Well"
20.	"Dancing Queen"

== Charts and certifications ==
=== Weekly charts ===
Chart (2011)	Peak position
Irish Albums (IRMA)	13
Scottish Albums (OCC)	1
UK Albums (OCC)	1

Chart (2017)	Peak position
UK Albums (OCC)	12

=== Year-end charts ===
Chart (2011)	Position
UK Albums (OCC)	72

=== Certifications ===
Region	Certification	Certified units/sales
United Kingdom (BPI)	Platinum	300,000^{‡}
^{‡} Sales+streaming figures based on certification alone.

== Release history ==
Region	Date	Format	Version	Label	Ref
United Kingdom	10 October 2011	CD; CD/DVD; Digital Download	Standard; Deluxe Edition	Sony Music	
United Kingdom	27 April 2012	CD; Digital Download	Tour Edition	Sony Music	
