= Gold: Greatest Hits (Steps album) =

Compilation album by Steps
- Released: 15 October 2001 (EU)
- Recorded: 1997–2001
- Genre: Pop
- Length: 75:08
- Label: Jive
- Producers: Pete Waterman; Karl Twigg; Mark Topham; Andrew Frampton; Jörgen Elofsson; David Kreuger; Quiz & Larossi; Graham Stack; Mark Taylor; Peter Cunnah; Simon Ellis; Walter Turbitt

Steps chronology
Buzz (2000)	Gold: Greatest Hits (2001)	The Last Dance (2002)

Singles from Gold: Greatest Hits
- 1. "Chain Reaction" Released: 24 September 2001; 2. "Words Are Not Enough" Released: 3 December 2001

Professional ratings
Review scores
Source	Rating
AllMusic	4/5 stars
NME	9/10 stars
RTÉ Entertainment	3/5 stars

Gold: Greatest Hits is the first greatest hits album released by British pop group Steps. It was released in 2001 and reached number one on the UK Albums Chart. The lead single from the album was "Chain Reaction", a cover of the Diana Ross hit; the Steps' version reached number 2 in the UK Singles chart and was the group's highest selling single since "Say You'll Be Mine/Better The Devil You Know". The second single from the album, the slow ballad "Words Are Not Enough", was released with a cover of "I Know Him So Well", from ABBAmania. The single was notably Steps' first single to have an accompanying video that was almost fully animated and did not feature a dance routine like their video for "Heartbeat". The single reached number 5 in the UK charts and was their lowest-selling single to date. A release for "Baby Don't Dance" was planned for 2002 but was scrapped due to the group's split although promotional copies surfaced before the release of The Last Dance.

== Background and release ==
Steps announced the release of their greatest hits album in May 2001. Shortly after, rumours started surfacing that the group would be splitting up following the release, although these rumours were continuously denied by the group during TV shows and interviews. While discussing the rumours during an interview with whereitsat.tv, band member Lisa Scott-Lee stated "I've got to be honest when I was growing up and I had a lot of my favourite bands bring out greatest hits I thought that, that was the end and "That's their final album" and I'm sure a lot of kids think that and a lot of other people but it's not the case we've actually got lots more albums in the pipeline, we're actually song writing right now for the greatest hits and the fourth album after that, so you know we haven't actually discussed splitting up so I don't see why other people should".

The album was released on 15 October 2001 in the UK.

== Composition ==
Gold: Greatest Hits consists of all the singles that Steps released, except for "You'll Be Sorry". It is notable that the single was not included on the compilation, although "Here and Now" was included. Four new tracks including "Chain Reaction" were featured on the album. A song called "Only in My Dreams" was written by the five members of the group with long-time collaborator Frampton, and was the only song from the album not to be released as a single or to be performed live.

The US version was released under the name The Best of Steps. The version of "One for Sorrow" on this album is the original mix, not the US Mix. The US version of the album features three singles that were not released in the US—"Better Best Forgotten", "Chain Reaction", and "Words Are Not Enough". This version of the album did not include all of Steps' singles.

== Commercial performance ==
On the first week of release the album went straight to Number 1 on the UK Albums Chart spending two weeks at the top of the chart. Registering a third non-consecutive week at Number 1 on 17/11/2001. It has sold over a million copies, giving the album a certification of x4 Platinum.

== Tour ==
To support the release of the album the group embarked on their fifth concert tour (Gold Tour) on 24 November 2001. The tour ended on 22 December 2001 and it was revealed on the TV show Steps Reunion that band members H and Claire had announced their resignation to the rest of the group two hours before going on stage for the last show. Lisa and Faye stated that the concert was difficult to perform, while Lee said that he felt the concert cheated the audience.

== Track listing ==
Standard edition
No.	Title	Writer(s)	Length
1.	"Tragedy" (from Steptacular)	Bee Gees	4:30
2.	"One for Sorrow" (from Step One)	Mark Topham; Karl Twigg; Lance Ellington	4:21
3.	"Stomp" (from Buzz)	Topham; Twigg; Rita Campbell; Bernard Edwards; Nile Rodgers	3:21
4.	"Better Best Forgotten" (Radio edit, UK track, from Step One)	Andrew Frampton; Pete Waterman	3:42
5.	"Love's Got a Hold on My Heart" (from Steptacular)	Frampton; Waterman	3:19
6.	"Deeper Shade of Blue" (Radio edit, from Steptacular)	Topham; Twigg	3:44
7.	"Last Thing on My Mind" (from Step One)	Stock; Waterman; Sara Dallin; Keren Woodward	3:04
8.	"Better the Devil You Know" (UK track, from Buzz)	Mike Stock; Matt Aitken; Waterman	3:48
9.	"Summer of Love" (from Buzz)	Topham; Twigg	3:51
10.	"5,6,7,8" (from Step One)	Barry Upton; Steve Crosby	3:21
11.	"Chain Reaction"	Bee Gees	3:56
12.	"Baby Don't Dance"	Peter Cunnah; Simon Ellis	3:50
13.	"It's the Way You Make Me Feel" (from Buzz)	Jörgen Elofsson	3:16
14.	"After the Love Has Gone" (from Steptacular)	Topham; Twigg; Ellington	4:34
15.	"Here and Now" (Q-Street Mix, UK track, from Buzz)	Andreas Carlsson; Ali Thomson	3:26
16.	"Say You'll Be Mine" (from Steptacular)	Frampton; Waterman	3:31
17.	"Only In My Dreams"	Lee Latchford-Evans; Claire Richards; Lisa Scott-Lee; Faye Tozer; Ian Watkins; Frampton	4:16
18.	"Words Are Not Enough"	Pelle Nylén; Carlsson	3:23
19.	"When I Said Goodbye" (UK track, Single version from Steptacular)	Topham; Twigg	3:32
20.	"Heartbeat" (UK track, from Step One)	Jackie James	4:23
Total length:			75:08

=== US release ===
Gold: Greatest Hits was released in 2002 in the United States as Best of Steps.

Standard edition
No.	Title	Length
1.	"Tragedy"	4:30
2.	"One for Sorrow"	4:21
3.	"Stomp"	3:21
4.	"It's the Way You Make Me Feel"	3:16
5.	"Love's Got a Hold on My Heart"	3:19
6.	"Heartbeat"	4:23
7.	"Better Best Forgotten"	3:42
8.	"Say You'll Be Mine"	3:31
9.	"Deeper Shade of Blue"	3:44
10.	"5,6,7,8"	3:21
11.	"Last Thing on My Mind"	3:04
12.	"Chain Reaction"	3:56
13.	"Words Are Not Enough"	3:23

=== Digital ===
Digital 2020 edition
No.	Title	Length
21.	"You'll Be Sorry (The Pardon Mix)"	3:31
22.	"I Know Him So Well"	4:15
23.	"Merry Xmas Everybody"	3:08
24.	"W.I.P. Megamix"	7:19

== Charts ==
=== Weekly charts ===
Chart (2001)	Peak position
Australian Albums (ARIA)	155
European Albums Chart	13
Icelandic Albums (Tonlist)	1
Irish Albums (IRMA)	1
Japanese Albums (Oricon)	92
New Zealand Albums (RIANZ)	17
UK Albums (OCC)	1

=== Year-end charts ===
Chart (2001)	Position
UK Albums Chart	6

== Certifications ==
Region	Certification	Certified units/sales
United Kingdom (BPI)	4× Platinum	1,129,620
