= The Ultimate Tour (Steps) =

2012 concert tour by Steps

- Tour by Steps
- Promotional image for tour
- Associated album: The Ultimate Collection
- Start date: 2 April 2012
- End date: 27 August 2012
- Legs: 2
- No. of shows: 30 in Total

Steps concert chronology
- Gold Tour (2001); The Ultimate Tour (2012); Christmas With Steps (2012)

The Ultimate Tour was the sixth concert tour by British group Steps. Formed in 1997, the group comprises Claire Richards, Faye Tozer, Ian "H" Watkins, Lee Latchford-Evans and Lisa Scott-Lee. Beginning in April 2012, 'The Ultimate Tour' supports the band's compilation album, The Ultimate Collection. It is the group's first concert tour in 11 years. Additional dates were added for the summer of 2012, playing music festivals. The tour predominantly visited arenas across the United Kingdom as well as a one-off performance in the Republic of Ireland. The initial UK dates sold out in the first few hours of their general release, leading the band to announce six new dates. Dates were also added for music festivals for summer 2012.

== Background ==
Sony record company intended to release a greatest hits album with the Steps music due to the ten-year anniversary following their 'acrimonious' split in 2001. Claire Richards said with the production of The Ultimate Collection album coupled with the ten-year anniversary, 'it just seemed right' to get back together. As the group reconciled, plans for a reunion tour developed. The tour was announced by Steps in their Sky Living documentary "Steps: Reunion". The tour was confirmed on the band appearance on This Morning. The band performed hits "Tragedy" and "It's the Way You Make Me Feel".

== Concert synopsis ==
The pre-show begins with a video shown on a large screen dominating the backdrop of the step, showing a one-minute countdown as the dancers come onstage. As the dancers arrive onstage, images of vaults and tubes with Steps inside are shown on the screens. The concept behind this is that the five members of Steps have been cryogenically frozen since their 2001 split at the final Manchester date.

The five band members rise onto the stage in five separate glass tubes, symbolising the idea that they are being awoken ten years after the split. The set list begins with "Here and Now" by performing from inside the tubes throughout the song. The song goes straight into "You'll Be Sorry". Afterwards, each member in turn is spotlighted as they introduce themselves to the crowd as their names appear on the screen. This is followed by "Deeper Shade of Blue" which also contains a dance break which samples Britney Spears' Hold It Against Me.

The group then exits the stage as a musical interlude and dance number by the dancers is played. Steps returns to the stage on a lift that sees them above the stage in height. Saying that they are back, they each split the crowd into different teams. Each member has their own team, and their own new dance move they show. Using these dance moves and the original choreography, they perform a medley of "Last Thing on My Mind", "Better Best Forgotten" and "Love's Got a Hold on My Heart", followed by "5,6,7,8" which is followed by a video montage of fans performing 5,6,7,8.

The next section begins with a salsa dance routine performed by the dancers. This section consists of "Summer of Love" Tour Mix, which was originally intended for the Steptacular Tour and "Better the Devil You Know", mixed with Lady Gaga's "Judas".

As with all of their other tours in the past, they each perform solo songs. Lee, performs a mashup of Maroon 5's hit "Moves Like Jagger" with Rihanna's "S&M". Faye performs "One Night Only". H performs a cover of Journey's "Don't Stop Believin'". Lisa sings a medley of "Heaven", "Beautiful People" and her debut hit single "Lately". Finally, Claire, performs a cover of Celine Dion's "I Surrender".

The next section begins with an operatic-style video interlude. "It's the Way You Make Me Feel" is next followed by "Heartbeat". "When I Said Goodbye" is then performed, followed by "One For Sorrow".

After the band goes offstage, during which a musical interlude is played, they return onstage with "Stomp" and "Chain Reaction". The show ends with their cover ABBA's "Dancing Queen", a song which was recorded especially for their Ultimate Collection album. After a brief pause, a remix interlude is heard before Steps return to the stage for the final time to perform the encore consisting of "Tragedy".

The tour uses innovative technology such as super high-resolution video screen. The screen is used reached to by the band, including H's solo section in which he performs synchronising movements against images onscreen, and a section performed by the whole band which references rhythm games such as Just Dance.

== Support acts ==
- Kamaliya
- Shockolady
- Alexandra Burke (Swansea)

== Setlist ==
Futuristic Intro

1. "Here and Now"
2. "You'll Be Sorry"
3. "Deeper Shade of Blue" (Sleazesisters Anthem Mix – Intro) – Contains elements of Hold It Against Me
4. Medley: "Last Thing on My Mind"/"Better Best Forgotten"/"Love's Got a Hold on My Heart"
5. "5,6,7,8"

Salsa
Costume Change

6. "Summer of Love"
7. "Better the Devil You Know"/"Judas"

Solos

8. Lee solo: "Moves Like Jagger" / "S&M"
9. Faye solo: "One Night Only"
10. 'H' solo: "Don't Stop Believin'"
11. Lisa solo: "Heaven" / "Beautiful People" / "Lately"
12. Claire solo: "I Surrender"

Ballads
Costume Change

13. "It's the Way You Make Me Feel" (Features an opera-styled intro)
14. "Heartbeat"
15. "When I Said Goodbye"
16. "One For Sorrow"

Disco
Costume Change

17. "Stomp"
18. "Chain Reaction"
19. "Dancing Queen"

Encore
Costume Change

20. "Tragedy"
21. "Goodbyes"/"Thank Yous"

== Tour dates ==
Date	City	Country	Venue
2 April 2012	Belfast	United Kingdom	Odyssey Arena
3 April 2012	Dublin	Ireland	The O_{2}
4 April 2012	Liverpool	United Kingdom	Echo Arena Liverpool
6 April 2012	Glasgow	United Kingdom	Scottish Exhibition and Conference Centre
7 April 2012	Aberdeen	United Kingdom	Press & Journal Arena
8 April 2012	Newcastle	United Kingdom	Metro Radio Arena
10 April 2012	Manchester	United Kingdom	Manchester Arena
11 April 2012	Nottingham	United Kingdom	Capital FM Arena
12 April 2012	Birmingham	United Kingdom	LG Arena
13 April 2012	Cardiff	United Kingdom	Motorpoint Arena Cardiff
15 April 2012	Sheffield	United Kingdom	Motorpoint Arena Sheffield
16 April 2012	Bournemouth	United Kingdom	Bournemouth International Centre
17 April 2012	Brighton	United Kingdom	The Brighton Centre
19 April 2012	London	United Kingdom	The O_{2} Arena
20 April 2012	London	United Kingdom	The O_{2} Arena
22 April 2012	Newcastle	United Kingdom	Metro Radio Arena
23 April 2012	Paisley	United Kingdom	Braehead Arena
25 April 2012	Birmingham	United Kingdom	LG Arena
26 April 2012	Manchester	United Kingdom	Manchester Arena
27 April 2012	Sheffield	United Kingdom	Motorpoint Arena Sheffield
6 July 2012^{[A]}	Cork	Ireland	The Docklands
7 July 2012	Hamilton	United Kingdom	Hamilton Park Racecourse
19 July 2012	Rochester	United Kingdom	Rochester Castle
20 July 2012	St Osyth	United Kingdom	The Venue
21 July 2012	Newton-le-Willows	United Kingdom	Haydock Park Racecourse
22 July 2012^{[C]}	Gloucestershire	United Kingdom	Westonbirt Arboretum
28 July 2012	Isle of Wight	United Kingdom	Osborne House
25 August 2012	Suffolk	United Kingdom	Newmarket Racecourse
26 August 2012	Swansea	United Kingdom	Singleton Park
27 August 2012^{[D]}	Northop	United Kingdom	Deeside College

Festivals and other miscellaneous performances
^{A} This concert was a part of "Live at the Marquee"
^{C} This concert was a part of "Forestry Commission Live Music"
^{D} This concert was a part of "Gŵyl Gobaith Music Festival"

Cancellations and rescheduled shows

8 July 2012	Leeds	Harewood House	Part of MFest	Cancelled
11 July 2012	London	Hyde Park	Hit Factory Live	Cancelled

=== Box office score data ===
Venue	City	Tickets sold / available	Gross revenue
The O_{2} Arena	London	26,926 / 30,540 (88%)	$1,754,830
Manchester Arena	Manchester	9,516 / 10,715 (89%)	$563,605

== Broadcasts and Recordings ==
During the autumn of 2011, Sky Living broadcast 'Steps Reunion', which documented the group's initial reconciliation. The show proved to be extremely successful, as it gained 1.3 million viewers each week throughout the series. Following the success of 'Steps Reunion', Sky Living broadcast 'Steps: On The Road Again', which started on Monday 23 April and ends on Monday 28 May. The show documents the band throughout the creation and development of the Ultimate Tour, including dance rehearsals, costume fittings, promotion interviews and the pre-tour performance at London's G-A-Y nightclub.

The concerts performed at Liverpool Echo Arena, Manchester Arena, The first Birmingham's LG Arena Show, Cardiff Motorpoint Arena and London O2 Arena, were all recorded for a Live CD release teamed up with Concert Live. The 3-disc set comes with choreographed videos, exclusive interviews and rehearsal footage, as well as never-before-seen photographs of the band. A new edition of the 'Ultimate Collection' was released on 30 April 2012, entitled 'Ultimate Collection: Tour Edition'. On Monday 28 May, Sky Living It are showing a 1-hour programme showing footage from Step's sold out concerts at The O2 Arena in London before the release of The Ultimate tour Live DVD on 29 October 2012. It charted at number one on the Official Charts Company's Music Video Chart on 4 November 2012

== Reception ==
The tour proved to be extremely popular amongst fans as the initial UK dates sold out in the first few hours of their general release. 100,000 tickets are claimed to have been sold when the tour officially went on sale, making it one of the most popular tours of the year.

The tour received fairly positive reviews, with positive critiques of their general energy and interaction with the crowd and praise over Claire's rendition of Celine Dion's 'I Surrender'. The overall reception by fans was extremely positive.
