= Step One =

Studio album by Steps
- Released: 14 September 1998
- Recorded: 1997–1998
- Studios: PWL Studios (London & Manchester)
- Genres: Pop; dance-pop; techno-pop; disco
- Length: 39:08
- Label: Jive
- Producers: Mark Topham; Karl Twigg; Pete Waterman; Andrew Frampton; Dan Sanders; W.I.P

Steps chronology
Step One (1998)	Steptacular (1999)

Singles from Step One
- 1. "5,6,7,8" Released: 27 November 1997; 2. "Last Thing on My Mind" Released: 17 April 1998; 3. "One for Sorrow" Released: 31 August 1998; 4. "Heartbeat" / "Tragedy" Released: 6 November 1998; 5. "Better Best Forgotten" Released: 8 March 1999

Professional ratings
Review scores
Source	Rating
AllMusic	4/5 stars
Answers.com	3.5/5 stars
DooYoo.co.uk	4/5 stars

Step One is the debut album by British pop group Steps. It was released in the UK and Europe on 14 September 1998. The album charted at number two on the UK Albums Chart upon its release, going on to spend 64 weeks in the chart. It was beaten to number one by This Is My Truth Tell Me Yours by Manic Street Preachers, who also beat Steps' single "One for Sorrow" to number one on the UK Singles Chart with the song "If You Tolerate This Your Children Will Be Next". In February 2000, the album was re-released in the US, containing songs from both Step One and its successor, Steptacular. The tracks "5,6,7,8", "Last Thing on My Mind", "One for Sorrow", "Heartbeat" and "Better Best Forgotten" were released as the singles in UK. In 2000, the album was certified 5× Platinum by the British Phonographic Industry, and has sold over 1.4 million copies in the UK.

The album contains some covers; "Last Thing on My Mind" was originally released in 1992 as a single by British girl group Bananarama, while "Love U More" was originally recorded by techno/house band Sunscreem. "Experienced" was originally recorded by boybands The Bario Boys & Worlds Apart, and "Stay With Me" appears on Romeo's Daughters' self-titled début album. "Tragedy", which was recorded for a Bee Gees tribute album, was paired with "Heartbeat" as a winter holiday double A-side single (included on the group's second album, Steptacular), but is also featured as a bonus track on some international editions of this album.

The album was reissued on vinyl for the first time ever in February 2024. It debuted at number 6 on the UK Vinyl Albums Chart.

== Track listing ==
Standard edition
No.	Title	Writer(s)	Producer(s)	Length
1.	"Steptro"	Mike Stock; Pete Waterman; Sara Dallin; Keren Woodward	Mark Topham; Karl Twigg; Waterman	0:56
2.	"Last Thing on My Mind"	Stock; Waterman; Dallin; Woodward	Topham; Twigg; Waterman	3:04
3.	"5,6,7,8"	Barry Upton; Steve Crosby	Topham; Twigg; Waterman	3:22
4.	"One for Sorrow"	Topham; Twigg; Lance Ellington	Topham; Twigg; Waterman	4:20
5.	"Heartbeat"	Jackie James	Andrew Frampton; Waterman	4:24
6.	"This Heart Will Love Again"	Frampton; Waterman	Dan Sanders; Frampton; Waterman	3:48
7.	"Experienced" (H solo)	Stock; Waterman	Frampton; Waterman	3:27
8.	"Too Weak to Resist" (H solo)	Frampton; Waterman	Frampton; Waterman	3:50
9.	"Better Best Forgotten"	Frampton; Waterman	Topham; Twigg; Waterman	3:42
10.	"Back to You"	Topham; Twigg	Topham; Twigg; Waterman	4:04
11.	"Love U More"	Lucia Holm; Paul Cannell	Work in Progress	3:57
12.	"Stay with Me"	Olga Lange; Craig Joiner; Anthony Mitman; Leigh Matty	Sanders; Waterman	4:04

Australian bonus tracks
No.	Title	Writer(s)	Producer(s)	Length
13.	"One for Sorrow" (W.I.P. remix)	Topham; Twigg; Ellington	Topham; Twigg; Waterman; W.I.P.	6:53
14.	"Tragedy"	Barry Gibb; Robin Gibb; Maurice Gibb	Topham; Twigg; Waterman	4:30

Japanese bonus tracks
No.	Title	Writer(s)	Producer(s)	Length
13.	"Tragedy"	B. Gibb; R. Gibb; M. Gibb	Topham; Twigg; Waterman
14.	"5,6,7,8" (W.I.P. remix)	Upton; Crosby	Topham; Twigg; Waterman; W.I.P.
15.	"One for Sorrow" (W.I.P. remix)	Topham; Twigg; Ellington	Topham; Twigg; Waterman; W.I.P.
16.	"Better Best Forgotten" (W.I.P. remix)	Frampton; Waterman	Topham; Twigg; Waterman; W.I.P.

=== American release ===
Steps’ North American debut album, released in 2000, was also (somewhat confusingly) titled Step One, yet it features a different song selection than their original album of the same name. At just eleven tracks, the American edition is primarily made-up of the group's “standout” singles, selected from both their debut album (Step One) and their second album (Steptacular).

“Better Best Forgotten" was not included and replaced with the album track “Stay with Me”. The American release essentially a "best-of" collection for the first two years of Steps’ career, 1998 through 2000. The American edition also utilises the cover artwork from their original second album, Steptacular. The original mix of "One for Sorrow" was omitted in-favour of Tony Moran’s remix, the same version to receive airplay on American radio.

Standard edition
No.	Title	Length
1.	"Tragedy" (BeeGees)	4:30
2.	"Say You'll Be Mine"	3:33
3.	"One for Sorrow" (US Mix)	3:30
4.	"Last Thing on My Mind"	3:05
5.	"5, 6, 7, 8"	3:23
6.	"Stay with Me"	4:05
7.	"Love's Got a Hold on My Heart"	3:20
8.	"After the Love Has Gone"	4:35
9.	"Heartbeat"	4:25
10.	"Deeper Shade of Blue"	4:16
11.	"Better the Devil You Know" (Stock Aitken Waterman)	3:48

US singles

1. "One for Sorrow" (US Mix)
2. "Tragedy"

== Personnel ==
- Producers:
  - Topham, Twigg and Waterman (for tracks 1, 2, 3, 4, 9, 10 and 13)
  - Frampton and Waterman (for tracks 5, 7 and 8)
  - Sanders, Frampton and Waterman (for track 6)
  - Work in Progress (W.I.P) (for tracks 11 and 13)
  - Sanders and Waterman (for track 12)
- Engineers:
  - Chris McDonnell (for tracks 1, 2, 3, 4, 10 and 13)
  - Dan Frampton (for tracks 5 and 7)
  - McDonnell and Frampton (for track 8 and 9)
  - Jason Barron, Martin Neary and Frampton (for track 6)
  - Paul Waterman (for track 11)
  - Barron (for track 12)
- Mixing:
  - Work in Progress (W.I.P) (for track 1)
  - Les Sharma (for track 3)
  - Paul Waterman (for tracks 2, 11 and 12)
  - Waterman and Dan Frampton (for 4, 5, 6 and 10)
  - Frampton (for tracks 7, 8 and 9)
  - Work in Progress (W.I.P) (for track 13)
- Assistant engineers: Bradlee/Al and Pete
- All tracks were recorded and mixed at the PWL Studios in London and Manchester.

== Charts ==
=== Weekly charts ===
Chart (1998–2000)	Peak position
Australian Albums (ARIA)	5
Belgian Albums (Ultratop Flanders)	1
Dutch Albums (Album Top 100)	33
European Albums Chart	14
Irish Albums (IRMA)	8
Japanese Albums (Oricon)	19
New Zealand Albums (RMNZ)	6
Scottish Albums (Official Charts)	4
Swedish Albums (Sverigetopplistan)	46
Taiwanese Albums (IFPI)	9
UK Albums (Official Charts)	2
US Billboard 200	79

Chart (2024)	Peak position
UK Vinyl Albums	6

=== Year-end charts ===
Chart (1998)	Position
Australian Albums (ARIA)	35
Belgian Albums (Ultratop Flanders)	4
UK Albums (OCC)	13

Chart (1999)	Position
Belgian Albums (Ultratop Flanders)	28
New Zealand Albums (RMNZ)	30
UK Albums (OCC)	16

== Certifications ==
Region	Certification	Certified units/sales
Australia (ARIA)	Platinum	70,000^{^}
Belgium (BRMA)	2× Platinum	100,000^{*}
Japan (RIAJ)	Gold	100,000^{^}
New Zealand (RMNZ)	Platinum	15,000^{^}
Philippines (PARI)	3× Platinum	
Singapore (SPVA)	Gold	
United Kingdom (BPI)	5× Platinum	1,402,303
United States	—	200,000
Summaries
Europe (IFPI)	Platinum	1,000,000^{*}
Worldwide	—	2,500,000
^{*} Sales figures based on certification alone.^{^} Shipments figures based on certification alone.

== Release history ==
Country	Release date	Format	Label	Catalogue
United Kingdom	14 September 1998	Standard edition (CD)	Jive / EBUL	015911-2
United Kingdom	14 September 1998	Standard edition (cassette)	Jive / EBUL	015911-4
Australia	14 September 1998	Limited edition (CD + Dance routine booklet)	Jive / Liberation	MUSH33147-2
Hong Kong	14 September 1998	Limited edition (CD + VCD)	Rock (HK)	ROD-9115
Indonesia	14 September 1998	Standard edition (CD)	Zomba	Z-CD-0110798
Netherlands	14 September 1998	Standard edition (CD)	Jive / EBUL	015911-2
Japan	1 January 1999	Standard edition (CD)	Jive / AVEX	AVCZ-95107
Germany	2 March 1999	Standard edition (CD)	Jive / EBUL	
Canada	9 July 1999	Standard edition (CD)	Jive / EBUL	01241-44149-2
United States	8 February 2000	Standard edition (CD)	Jive	01241-41688-4
Brazil	21 August 2000	Standard edition (CD)	Jive	01241-41635-2
Worldwide	23 February 2024	Vinyl	Jive	
