= Steptacular =

Studio album by Steps
- Released: 25 October 1999
- Recorded: 1998–1999
- Studios: PWL Studios, Sarm East, The Workhouse (London)
- Genres: Pop; dance-pop; electropop; synthpop; Europop; disco
- Length: 55:25
- Label: Jive
- Producers: Mark Topham; Karl Twigg; Pete Waterman; Andrew Frampton; Dan Sanders; W.I.P

Steps chronology
Step One (1998)	Steptacular (1999)	Buzz (2000)

Singles from Steptacular
- 1. "Love's Got a Hold on My Heart" Released: 12 July 1999; 2. "After the Love Has Gone" Released: 11 October 1999; 3. "Say You'll Be Mine" Released: 13 December 1999; 4. "Deeper Shade of Blue" Released: 3 April 2000; 5. "When I Said Goodbye" / "Summer of Love" Released: 3 July 2000

Professional ratings
Review scores
Source	Rating
AllMusic	2/5 stars
Yahoo! Music UK	4/10 stars

Steptacular is the second studio album by British pop group Steps, released in the United Kingdom on 25 October 1999, through Jive Records. The album was accompanied by five singles; "Love's Got a Hold on My Heart", "After the Love Has Gone", "Say You'll Be Mine", "Deeper Shade of Blue" and "When I Said Goodbye" all hit the UK top 5, making Steptacular the first Steps album to contain six consecutive UK top-five hits. Steptacular debuted at number one on the UK Albums Chart, and it remained on the position for three weeks, selling 260,000 copies in the same time frame.

The album was reissued on vinyl for the first time ever in February 2024. It debuted at number 5 on the UK Vinyl Albums Chart.

== Background and release ==
Like the group's debut album, Steptacular also contains covers, including a song originally released by female pop group Bananarama entitled "Movin' On", "Make It Easy on Me" originally recorded by Sybil and "Deeper Shade of Blue" originally recorded by Tina Cousins. The album also includes the group's version of "Tragedy", which was originally recorded for the Bee Gees tribute album Gotta Get a Message to You, which was released shortly after Step One. Early UK copies of the album featured a holographic silver "STEPS" logo on front. It was also released in cardboard and tin boxed sets, internationally.

== Commercial performance ==
On 31 October 1999, the album debuted at number one in the United Kingdom and remained for three consecutive weeks. The album sold 84,000 units in its first week—only 1,000 copies ahead of Westlife's debut album, Westlife, beating the Irish boy band.

== Track listing ==
Steptacular track listing
No.	Title	Writer(s)	Producer(s)	Length
1.	"Tragedy"	Barry Gibb; Robin Gibb; Maurice Gibb	Mark Topham; Karl Twigg; Pete Waterman	4:30
2.	"After the Love Has Gone"	Topham; Twigg; Lance Ellington	Topham; Twigg; Waterman	4:35
3.	"Love's Got a Hold on My Heart"	Andrew Frampton; Waterman	Frampton; Waterman	3:19
4.	"Say You'll Be Mine"	Frampton; Waterman	Frampton; Waterman	3:33
5.	"I Think It's Love" (Claire solo)	Topham; Twigg; Ellington	Topham; Twigg; Waterman	4:28
6.	"Make It Easy on Me" (Lisa solo)	Mike Stock; Matt Aitken; Waterman	Work in Progress	3:34
7.	"Deeper Shade of Blue"	Topham; Twigg	Topham; Twigg; Waterman	4:16
8.	"Movin' On"	Stock; Waterman; Sara Dallin; Keren Woodward	Work in Progress	3:29
9.	"Never Say Never Again"	Frampton; Waterman	Frampton; Waterman	3:51
10.	"When I Said Goodbye"	Topham; Twigg	Topham; Twigg; Waterman	3:30
11.	"I Surrender"	Topham; Twigg	Topham; Twigg; Waterman	3:42
12.	"Since You Took Your Love Away" (Faye solo)	Frampton; Waterman	Frampton; Waterman	4:35
13.	"My Best Friend's Girl" (H solo)	Topham; Twigg; Ellington	Topham; Twigg; Waterman	3:40
14.	"You're Everything That Matters to Me"	Jackie James	Dan Sanders; Waterman	4:23

Canadian bonus tracks
No.	Title	Writer(s)	Length
15.	"Last Thing on My Mind"	Stock; Waterman; Dallin; Woodward	3:04
16.	"5, 6, 7, 8"	Barry Upton; Steve Crosby	3:22

Japanese bonus tracks
No.	Title	Writer(s)	Length
15.	"Just Like the First Time"	Frampton; Waterman	3:28
16.	"One for Sorrow" (Tony Moran's 7-inch remix)	Topham; Twigg; Ellington	3:30

Australian edition
No.	Title	Writer(s)	Length
1.	"After the Love Has Gone"	Mark Topham; Karl Twigg; Lance Ellington	4:35
2.	"Say You'll Be Mine"	Frampton; Waterman	3:33
3.	"Tragedy"	Barry Gibb; Robin Gibb; Maurice Gibb	4:30
4.	"Love's Got a Hold on My Heart"	Andrew Frampton; Pete Waterman	3:19
5.	"I Think It's Love" (Claire solo)	Topham; Twigg; Ellington	4:28
6.	"Make It Easy on Me" (Lisa solo)	Stock Aitken Waterman; Mike Stock; Matt Aitken; Waterman	3:34
7.	"Deeper Shade of Blue"	Topham; Twigg	4:16
8.	"Movin' On"	Stock; Waterman; Sara Dallin; Keren Woodward	3:29
9.	"Never Say Never Again"	Frampton; Waterman	3:51
10.	"When I Said Goodbye"	Topham; Twigg	3:30
11.	"I Surrender"	Topham; Twigg	3:42
12.	"Since You Took Your Love Away" (Faye solo)	Frampton; Waterman	4:35
13.	"My Best Friend's Girl" (H solo)	Topham; Twigg; Ellington	3:40
14.	"You're Everything That Matters to Me"	Jackie James	4:23
15.	"Just Like the First Time"	Frampton; Waterman	3:28
16.	"One for Sorrow" (Tony Moran's 7-inch remix)	Topham; Twigg; Ellington	3:30

Limited edition bonus CD
No.	Title	Length
1.	"After the Love Has Gone"	4:35
2.	"After the Love Has Gone" (W.I.P. mix)	5:37
3.	"To Be Your Hero"	3:50
4.	"One for Sorrow" (Tony Moran's 7-inch remix)	3:30

Notes

- Steptacular was released in Australia with a revised track listing, including two bonus tracks.
- Steptacular was released in Hong Kong, Malaysia and Taiwan in a boxed set limited edition, containing the UK track list of the album and the CD single for "After the Love Has Gone".

== Personnel ==
- Producers
  - Topham, Twigg and Waterman (for tracks 1, 3, 5, 7, 10, 11 and 13)
  - Frampton and Waterman (for tracks 2, 4, 9 and 12)
  - Work in Progress (W.I.P) (for tracks 6 and 8)
  - Sanders and Waterman (for track 14)
- Engineers
  - Chris McDonnell (for tracks 1, 3, 5, 10 and 11)
  - McDonnell and Tim "Spag" Speight (for tracks 7 and 13)
  - Dan Frampton (for tracks 2, 4, 9 and 12)
  - Paul Waterman (for tracks 6 and 8)
  - Speight and Al Unsworth (for track 14)
- Mixing
  - Tim "Spag" Speight (for tracks 1, 5 and 7)
  - Dan Frampton and Paul Waterman (for track 3)
  - Frampton (for tracks 2, 4, 9, 12 and 14)
  - Waterman (for tracks 6 and 8)
  - Chris McDonnell (for tracks 10, 11 and 13)
- Backing vocals: Mary Carewe, Mae McKenna, Andrew Frampton, Lance Ellington, Bernadette Barlow
- Assistant engineers: Al Unsworth and Roe Waterman
- Photography: Mike Owen
- Mastered by Richard Dowling at Transfermation
- All tracks were recorded and mixed at PWL studios in London and Manchester.

== Charts and certifications ==
=== Weekly charts ===
Weekly chart performance for Steptacular
Chart (1999)	Peak position
Australian Albums (ARIA)	25
Belgian Albums (Ultratop Flanders)	2
Dutch Albums (Album Top 100)	46
European Albums Chart	10
Irish Albums (IRMA)	11
Japanese Albums (Oricon)	25
Scottish Albums (Official Charts)	1
UK Albums (Official Charts)	1
UK Independent Albums (Official Charts)	1

Chart (2024)	Peak position
UK Vinyl Albums	5

=== Year-end charts ===
1999 year-end chart performance for Steptacular
Chart (1999)	Position
Belgian Albums (Ultratop Flanders)	36
UK Albums (OCC)	7

2000 year-end chart performance for Steptacular
Chart (2000)	Position
UK Albums (OCC)	45

=== Certifications ===
Certifications for Steptacular
Region	Certification	Certified units/sales
Belgium (BRMA)	Platinum	50,000^{*}
Philippines (PARI)	Gold	
United Kingdom (BPI)	4× Platinum	1,291,588
Summaries
Europe (IFPI)	Platinum	1,000,000^{*}
^{*} Sales figures based on certification alone.

== Release history ==
Release history and formats for Steptacular
Country	Release date	Format	Label	Catalogue
Japan	13 October 1999	Standard edition (CD + bonus tracks)	Jive / AVEX	AVCZ-95126
UK	25 October 1999	Limited Edition/Holographic logo (CD)	Jive / Ebul	0519442
UK	25 October 1999	Standard edition (CD)	Jive / Ebul	051994-2
UK	25 October 1999	Standard edition (cassette)	Jive / Ebul	051994-4
Australia	25 October 1999	Limited edition (CD + collector card and sticker)	Jive / Zomba	051956-2
Netherlands	25 October 1999	Standard edition (CD)	Jive / EBUL	051994-2
Hong Kong	November 1999	Limited edition (2 CD + cardboard boxed set)	ROD	9145-4
Taiwan	November 1999	Limited edition (2 CD + tin boxed set)		
Canada	22 February 2000	Standard edition (CD + bonus tracks)	Jive / EBUL	01241-44167-2
Germany	20 March 2000	Standard edition (CD)		
Worldwide	23 February 2024	Vinyl	Jive	
