= After the Love Has Gone (Steps song) =

1999 single by Steps

Single by Steps

from the album Steptacular
- B-side: "My Best Friend's Girl"
- Released: 11 October 1999
- Studio: PWL (London and Manchester, England)
- Genre: Dance-pop
- Length: 4:35
- Label: Jive; Ebul
- Songwriters: Mark Topham; Karl Twigg; Lance Ellington
- Producers: Mark Topham; Karl Twigg; Pete Waterman

Steps singles chronology
"Love's Got a Hold on My Heart" (1999)	"After the Love Has Gone" (1999)	"Say You'll Be Mine" / "Better the Devil You Know" (1999)

Music video
- "After the Love Has Gone" on YouTube

"After the Love Has Gone" is a song by British dance-pop group Steps, released as the third single from their second album, Steptacular. The track continues the group's pop sound but has clear Asian musical influences. Claire Richards sung lead vocals.

== Critical reception ==
AllMusic editor Jon O'Brien described the song as "melancholic dance-pop". Scottish newspaper Aberdeen Evening Express stated that it "has all the trademark Steps piano bits", noting that it "does sound a bit too much" like "Love's Got a Hold on My Heart". Can't Stop the Pop said that the most distinctive element of the track is that it's "proudly dressed up as an oriental number." They also complimented its "beautiful melancholy" lyrics. Sunday Mirror commented, "Net more ABBA sound-aliking from the Steps crew. This dance routine's a bit tricky though."

== Chart performance ==
The song spent 11 weeks on the UK Singles Chart, peaking at number five. It fell out of the top 75 after nine weeks but rose back up to spend two more weeks inside the top 75.

== Music video ==
The music video for the song was shot at Universal Studios Florida in Orlando and has Asian influences. It was directed by Cameron Casey and Simón Brand. The group wear jade-green outfits for the dance sequences, in a setting of Chinese lanterns and a lion dance.

== Track listings ==
UK CD single

1. "After the Love Has Gone" – 4:35
2. "After the Love Has Gone" (W.I.P. Mix) – 5:37
3. "My Best Friend's Girl" – 3:40

European maxi-CD single

1. "After the Love Has Gone" (radio mix) – 4:35
2. "After the Love Has Gone" (video mix) – 4:35
3. "After the Love Has Gone" (W.I.P. Mix) – 5:37
4. "My Best Friend's Girl" – 3:40

UK cassette single and European CD single

1. "After the Love Has Gone" – 4:35
2. "My Best Friend's Girl" – 3:40

Australian CD single

1. "After the Love Has Gone" (radio mix) – 4:35
2. "After the Love Has Gone" (W.I.P. Mix) – 5:37
3. "My Best Friend's Girl" – 3:40
4. "One for Sorrow" (Tony Moran's 7-inch remix) – 3:30

== Credits and personnel ==
Credits are adapted from the liner notes of Steptacular.

=== A-side: "After the Love Has Gone" ===
Recording

- Recorded at PWL Studios (London and Manchester, England)
- Additionally recorded at The Workhouse Studios and Sarm East (London, England)
- Mixed at PWL Studios (London and Manchester, England)
- Mastered at Transfermation (London, England)

Personnel

- Songwriting – Mark Topham, Karl Twigg, Lance Ellington
- Production – Mark Topham, Karl Twigg, Pete Waterman
- Mixing – Tim "Spag" Speight
- Engineering – Chris McDonnell
- Drums – Chris McDonnell
- Keyboards – Karl Twigg
- Guitars – Mark Topham, Erwin Keiles
- Bass – Mark Topham
- Mandolin – Erwin Keiles

=== B-side: "My Best Friend's Girl" ===
Recording

- Recorded at PWL Studios (London and Manchester, England)
- Additionally recorded at The Workhouse Studios and Sarm East (London, England)
- Mixed at PWL Studios (London and Manchester, England)
- Mastered at Transfermation (London, England)

Personnel

- Songwriting – Mark Topham, Karl Twigg, Lance Ellington
- Production – Mark Topham, Karl Twigg, Pete Waterman
- Mixing – Chris McDonnell
- Engineering – Chris McDonnell, Tim "Spag" Speight
- Drums – Chris McDonnell
- Keyboards – Karl Twigg
- Guitar – Mark Topham
- Bass – Mark Topham

== Charts ==
=== Weekly charts ===
Chart (1999)	Peak position
Australia (ARIA)	47
Belgium (Ultratop 50 Flanders)	13
Europe (Eurochart Hot 100)	23
Ireland (IRMA)	18
Netherlands (Dutch Top 40 Tipparade)	17
Netherlands (Single Top 100)	63
Scottish Singles Sales (Official Charts)	4
UK Singles (Official Charts)	5
UK Indie (Official Charts)	2

=== Year-end charts ===
Chart (1999)	Position
UK Singles (OCC)	113
