= Chain Reaction (Diana Ross song) =

1985 single by Diana Ross

Single by Diana Ross

from the album Eaten Alive
- B-side: "More and More"
- Released: November 12, 1985
- Genre: R&B; dance-pop
- Length: 3:49
- Label: RCA; Capitol
- Songwriters: Barry Gibb; Robin Gibb; Maurice Gibb
- Producer: Gibb-Galuten-Richardson

Diana Ross singles chronology
"Eaten Alive" (1985)	"Chain Reaction" (1985)	"Experience" (1985)

Music video
- "Chain Reaction" on YouTube

"Chain Reaction" is a song by American singer Diana Ross, released on November 12, 1985, by RCA and Capitol, as the second single from her sixteenth studio album, Eaten Alive (1985). The song was written by the Bee Gees and contains additional vocals from Barry Gibb. Sonically, "Chain Reaction" is an R&B and dance-pop song. According to the Gibbs' biography, the brothers had initial reservations about offering the song to Ross in case it was too Motown-like for her.

Released in the UK in January 1986, "Chain Reaction" was Ross"s second single to top the UK Singles Chart after "I'm Still Waiting" in 1971, spending three weeks at No. 1 from March 8, 1986, and earning the singer a gold disc. It also hit No. 1 in Australia—where it became the best selling single of 1986—Ireland, and Zimbabwe. In New Zealand, it peaked at No. 3 and it made the top 5 in South Africa. In 1993, the song entered the UK top 20 again, when it was re-released to commemorate Ross's 30th anniversary in show business. The song fared poorly in the US, where it initially peaked at No. 95 on the Billboard Hot 100 in late 1985. A few months later, a remixed version of the song was issued as a single (Ross performed this version of the song on the American Music Awards, which she hosted that year). The new version re-entered the chart and performed better, stalling at No. 66 on the Billboard Hot 100 and No. 77 on the Cash Box Top 100.

== Music video ==
At the beginning of the accompanying music video for "Chain Reaction" in black-and-white, Ross enters a TV studio and proceeds to perform the song in front of dancing spectators in a '60s-style live TV. The performance is intercut with a view from the station control room where producers are shown additional scenes appearing in color, confounding them on where the scenes are coming from. Half-way through Ross is walking up a desolate street with barrels of fire littered around and dancers in the background. Careful lighting and fog help create the effect Ross is performing on a real street. It is the only time the street is shown and the video eventually returns to the TV studio performance. The final style of scene has Ross performing in what is supposed to be the glamorous front exterior of the TV studio. A quick shot of the control room is shown with the lead producer yelling in shock or frustration, before the scene continues. It's assumed the producers have lost control of the broadcast. The video ends with intercuts of the TV performance, the exterior, and the control room. The band finishes in the black and white scenes of their show, dancing with the audience and using a combination of both color scenes.

== Charts ==
=== Weekly charts ===
Weekly chart performance for "Chain Reaction"
Chart (1985–1986)	Peak position
Australia (Kent Music Report)	1
Belgium (Ultratop 50 Flanders)	35
Canada (The Record)	25
Canada Top Singles (RPM)	40
Europe (Eurochart Hot 100)	7
Finland (Suomen virallinen lista)	15
France (SNEP)	20
Ireland (IRMA)	1
Luxembourg (Radio Luxembourg)	1
Netherlands (Dutch Top 40 Tipparade)	2
Netherlands (Single Top 100)	40
New Zealand (Recorded Music NZ)	3
South Africa (Springbok Radio)	4
Switzerland (Schweizer Hitparade)	20
UK Singles (Official Charts)	1
US Billboard Hot 100	66
US Adult Contemporary (Billboard)	25
US Dance Club Songs (Billboard)	7
US Hot R&B/Hip-Hop Songs (Billboard)	85
US Cash Box Top 100	77
West Germany (GfK)	11

2022 weekly chart performance for "Chain Reaction"
Chart (2022)	Peak position
UK Singles Downloads (Official Charts)	49

=== Year-end charts ===
1986 year-end chart performance for "Chain Reaction"
Chart (1986)	Position
Australia (Kent Music Report)	1
New Zealand (RIANZ)	36
UK Singles (OCC)	5
West Germany (Media Control)	52

== Certifications and sales ==
Region	Certification	Certified units/sales
United Kingdom (BPI)	Gold	677,000

== "Chain Reaction '93" ==
"Chain Reaction '93"

Single by Diana Ross
- B-side: "Upside Down"
- Released: September 27, 1993
- Length: 3:50
- Label: Stateside; EMI United Kingdom
- Songwriters: Barry Gibb; Robin Gibb; Maurice Gibb
- Producer: Gibb-Galuten-Richardson

Diana Ross singles chronology
"When You Tell Me That You Love Me" (1991)	"Chain Reaction '93" (1993)	"Take Me Higher" (1995)

In 1993, Diana Ross released "Chain Reaction '93". Producing the remix herself, the single was also successful in the United Kingdom. This version's purely instrumental sound differs it from the original. A music video was not recorded for the song.

=== Track listings ===
- CD single
1. "Chain Reaction '93" – 3:47
2. "Upside Down" – 4:07
- 12-inch UK remix single
1. "Chain Reaction" (Original 12-inch Version) – 6:50
2. "Chain Reaction" (Reaction Dub, remix by E-Smoove) – 6:34
3. "Chain Reaction" (Low End Mix, remix by Dewey B and Spike) – 6:15
4. "Chain Reaction" (Low End Dub, remix by Dewey B and Spike) – 6:15
5. "Chain Reaction" (Smoove Reaction Instrumental, remix by E-Smoove) – 8:40
- French 2-track CD single
1. Original Single Version – 3:47
2. '93 remix
- Italian 12-inch
1. "Chain Reaction" (Original Single Version) – 3:47
2. "Love Hangover" (Tribal Hangover – remix and additional production by Frankie Knuckles for Def Mix Productions) – 9:31
3. "Upside Down" ('93 Remix – Remix and additional production by Satoshi Tomiie and David Morales for Def Mix Productions.) – 8:09
4. "Upside Down" (Dub 2 – Remix and additional production by Satoshi Tomiie and David Morales for Def Mix Productions.) – 7:37
5. "Someday We'll Be Together" ('93 Remix – Remix and additional production by Frankie Knuckles for Def Mix Productions) – 8:45

=== Charts ===
Chart (1993)	Peak position
Europe (Eurochart Hot 100)	60
Ireland (IRMA)	26
UK Singles (Official Charts)	20
UK Airplay (Music Week)	35

== Steps version ==
"Chain Reaction"

Single by Steps

from the album Gold: Greatest Hits
- B-side: "One for Sorrow" (remix); "Stop Me from Loving You"
- Released: September 24, 2001
- Studio: Olympic, Sub-urban, Sound Surfer, Battery (London, England)
- Length: 3:56
- Label: Jive; Ebul
- Songwriter: Barry, Robin & Maurice Gibb
- Producers: Graham Stack; Mark Taylor

Steps singles chronology
"Here and Now" / "You'll Be Sorry" (2001)	"Chain Reaction" (2001)	"Words Are Not Enough" / "I Know Him So Well" (2001)

Music video
- "Chain Reaction" on YouTube

British pop group Steps covered "Chain Reaction" on their first compilation album, Gold: Greatest Hits (2001). The song was released as a single on September 24, 2001, by Jive and Ebul. It was produced by Graham Stack and Mark Taylor, reaching number two on the UK Singles Chart and number 12 on the Eurochart Hot 100.

=== Music video ===
The first scene in the music video for "Chain Reaction" is two paramedics lifting a patient from the ambulance onto the ground on a stretcher. H is the patient and Lee is one of the paramedics. Then, Lee pushes H into the hospital. The next scene is a receptionist and this turns out to be Claire. She sings her verse. Then, the camera goes over to a nurse who is Faye. She sings her verse. Then, the camera follows Faye over to Lee and H. We now know that Faye loves Lee so she touches his hand. Then Faye calls Claire over and they start making their way over to the operating theatre. Lee then calls a doctor over which turns out to be Lisa. We now also know that Lisa loves H.

The next scene is H singing his verse while the others are acting their parts. Then, Lisa sings her verse and then Faye holds the operating camera and the light shines into the camera. At this point, Steps are seen in a change of clothes which are brown and white. We also see them dancing. They have close up shots and are each seen with a particular piece of furniture. Claire appears with a corner sofa. Faye appears on a furry staircase. Lee appears with a set of five dining chairs. Lisa appears with three tall pillar lamps, while H appears with a high back armchair. The video ends with Steps close together singing the last line of the song. The video was filmed at Greenwich Hospital and a studio in London.

=== Track listings ===
- UK CD1 and cassette single; Australasian CD single
1. "Chain Reaction" – 3:56
2. "One for Sorrow" (Tony Moran US remix) – 3:29
3. "Stop Me from Loving You" – 3:45
- UK CD2
1. "Chain Reaction" (Graham Stack extended mix) – 6:28
2. "One for Sorrow" (Tony Moran extended club mix) – 6:38
3. "One for Sorrow" (Sleazesisters 12-inch Anthem mix) – 6:48
4. "One for Sorrow" (promotional video) – 3:56
- European CD single
1. "Chain Reaction" – 3:56
2. "One for Sorrow" (Tony Moran US remix) – 3:29

=== Credits and personnel ===
Credits are adapted from the Gold: Greatest Hits album booklet.

Recording

- Recorded at Olympic, Sub-urban, Sound Surfer, and Battery Studios (London, England)
- Mixed at Battery Studios (London, England)
- Mastered at Transfermation (London, England)

Vocals

- Backing vocals – Tracey Ackerman
- Vocal recording engineer – Paul "dub" Watson (Olympic Studios)

Personnel

- Songwriting – Barry Gibb, Robin Gibb, Maurice Gibb
- Production – Graham Stack, Mark Taylor
- Mixing – Walter Turbitt, Mark Taylor, Graham Stack
- Engineering – Walter Turbitt
- Engineering assistance – Mark Williams
- Drums – Pete Waterman
- Brazilian percussion – Luís Jardim
- Percussion recording engineer – Mark Williams (Battery Studios)
- Keyboards – Graham Stack
- Programming – Graham Stack

=== Charts ===
==== Weekly charts ====
Chart (2001–2002)	Peak position
Australia (ARIA)	41
Europe (Eurochart Hot 100)	12
Ireland (IRMA)	8
Scottish Singles Sales (Official Charts)	3
UK Singles (Official Charts)	2
UK Airplay (Music Week)	48
UK Indie (Official Charts)	1

==== Year-end charts ====
Chart (2001)	Position
UK Singles (OCC)	37

=== Certifications ===
Region	Certification	Certified units/sales
United Kingdom (BPI)	Silver	200,000^{^}
^{^} Shipments figures based on certification alone.

=== Release history ===
Region	Date	Format(s)	Label(s)	Ref.
United Kingdom	September 24, 2001	CD; cassette	Jive; Ebul	
Australia	January 28, 2002	CD	Jive; Ebul	

== Other cover versions ==
- The Shadows did an instrumental version on Simply Shadows (1987).
- Cliff Richard did a cover with Steps in 2001 on the ITV show Cliff Richard: The Hits I Missed.
- Australian group Young Divas recorded a cover of the song for their second album New Attitude, released in 2007.
- Swedish pop-dance singer Daniela Vecchia recorded cover of the song and released it as a stand-alone CD single in January 2010.
- UK car insurance comparison site Confused.com used a cover of the song on a 2011 advert starring Louise Dearman.

== See also ==
- List of UK Singles Chart number ones of the 1980s
