= Jackie James =

Jackie James is a Scottish singer/songwriter and keyboard player. James wrote the Million seller, "Heartbeat" for the group Steps, and went on to write more songs for the group. She has also written songs for Celine Dion, Jennifer Lopez and Kylie Minogue. Pete Waterman, who signed James to his music publishing company, and worked closely with her, said James was "as close as anyone has come in the UK to legendary singer and songwriting legend Carole King, in terms of having her songs recorded by other artists while retaining a separate successful solo performing career". (:Source Music Week)

She was also a founder member of MistraLE, who had success in Europe with their single "Dance in the Moonlight" (Scorpio Records) featuring James on lead vocals. She also co-wrote the song. MistraLE toured Europe with "The Cool Breeze Tour".

James is also a member of PowerHouse Music Inc., a songwriting and production company, working successfully in the world of Film, Television & Advertising, together with former Talk Talk keyboard player, Ian Curnow and her business manager Billy Royal.
