= When I Said Goodbye / Summer of Love =

2000 single by Steps

"When I Said Goodbye" / "Summer of Love"

Single by Steps

from the album Steptacular and Buzz
- Released: 3 July 2000
- Studio: PWL (London and Manchester, England)
- Genre: Latin pop ("Summer of Love")
- Length: 3:32 ("When I Said Goodbye"); 3:52 ("Summer of Love")
- Label: Jive; Ebul
- Songwriters: Mark Topham; Karl Twigg
- Producers: Mark Topham; Karl Twigg; Pete Waterman

Steps singles chronology
"Deeper Shade of Blue" (2000)	"When I Said Goodbye" / "Summer of Love" (2000)	"Stomp" (2000)

Music videos
- "When I Said Goodbye" on YouTube; "When I Said Goodbye" (Colour version) on YouTube; "Summer of Love" on YouTube

"When I Said Goodbye" and "Summer of Love" are two songs by British pop music group Steps, released as a double A-side single. "When I Said Goodbye" is taken from their second studio album, Steptacular (1999), while "Summer of Love" was a previously unavailable track, later included on their third album, Buzz (2000). Following its release on 3 July 2000, the single peaked at number five in the United Kingdom and number 18 in Ireland.

== Critical reception ==
Can't Stop the Pop described "Summer of Love" as "an obvious nod" to the Latin-pop craze which dominated the charts at the time. They added that "everything about this track is ramped up to the max" and "moves with such pace that you’d scarcely believe it’s almost four minutes long because it zips by in a flash."

== Chart performance ==
"When I Said Goodbye" / "Summer of Love" peaked at number five on the UK Singles Chart and spent 11 weeks in the top 75, two of which were spent in the top 10. The single also reached number 18 in Ireland.

== Music videos ==
The video for "When I Said Goodbye" was a black-and-white video shot in Rome, Italy. It features shots of the members singing solemnly. A colour version was released in 2022. In contrast, the video for "Summer of Love" features brightly coloured clothes and energetic dancing. It portrays Steps and their dancers as "good" Steps (colourful and dressed innocently) and "bad" Steps (dressed in leather, with black makeup); in the end, good Steps chase bad Steps away with their dancing.

== Track listings ==
UK CD single

1. "When I Said Goodbye" – 3:32
2. "Summer of Love" – 3:52
3. "Summer of Love" (W.I.P. remix) – 6:38

UK cassette single

1. "When I Said Goodbye" – 3:32
2. "Summer of Love" – 3:52

== Credits and personnel ==
=== "When I Said Goodbye" ===
Credits are adapted from the liner notes of Steptacular.

Recording

- Recorded at PWL Studios (London and Manchester, England)
- Additionally recorded at The Workhouse Studios and Sarm East (London, England)
- Mixed at PWL Studios (London and Manchester, England)
- Mastered at Transfermation (London, England)

Personnel

- Songwriting – Mark Topham, Karl Twigg
- Production – Mark Topham, Karl Twigg, Pete Waterman
- Mixing – Chris McDonnell
- Engineering – Chris McDonnell
- Drums – Chris McDonnell
- Keyboards – Karl Twigg
- Guitar – Mark Topham
- Bass – Mark Topham

=== "Summer of Love" ===
Credits are adapted from the liner notes of Buzz.

Recording

- Recorded at PWL Studios (Manchester, England)
- Mixed at PWL Studios (Manchester, England)
- Mastered at Transfermation (London, England)

Vocals

- Background vocals – Rita Campbell, Andy Caine

Personnel

- Songwriting – Mark Topham, Karl Twigg
- Production – Mark Topham, Karl Twigg, Pete Waterman
- Mixing – Steve Price
- Engineering – Tim "Spag" Speight
- Engineering assistance – Roe & Dan
- Keyboards – Karl Twigg
- Guitars – Greg Bone
- Bass – Mark Topham

== Charts ==
=== Weekly charts ===
Chart (2000)	Peak position
Europe (Eurochart Hot 100)	24
Ireland (IRMA)	18
Scottish Singles Sales (Official Charts)	6
UK Singles (Official Charts)	5
UK Airplay (Music Week)	49
UK Indie (Official Charts)	2

=== Year-end charts ===
Chart (2000)	Position
UK Singles (OCC)	90
