= Deeper Shade of Blue =

2000 single by Steps

Single by Steps

from the album Steptacular
- Released: 3 April 2000
- Studio: PWL (London and Manchester, England)
- Length: 4:16 (album version); 3:45 (radio edit)
- Label: Jive; Ebul
- Songwriters: Mark Topham; Karl Twigg
- Producers: Mark Topham; Karl Twigg; Pete Waterman

Steps singles chronology
"Say You'll Be Mine" / "Better the Devil You Know" (1999)	"Deeper Shade of Blue" (2000)	"When I Said Goodbye" / "Summer of Love" (2000)

Music video
- "Deeper Shade of Blue" on YouTube

"Deeper Shade of Blue" is a song by British dance-pop group Steps, released as the fourth single from their second studio album, Steptacular (1999), on 3 April 2000. The song was originally recorded by English singer-songwriter Tina Cousins, but aside from a few promotional 12-inch vinyl discs pressed in 1998, her version remains unreleased. "Deeper Shade of Blue" entered the UK Singles Chart at number four and spent one more week in the top 10 before falling down the charts. After a total of nine weeks, it left the top 100.

In October 2011, following the band's reunion, Steps performed the track on Lorraine and Loose Women. The song was included on Steps's compilation albums Gold: Greatest Hits (2001), The Last Dance (2002), and The Ultimate Collection (2011). On 1 September 2015, Claire Richards premiered a stripped-backed piano recording of the track via her social media pages.

== Composition ==
The first two verses of the song are performed by Ian "H" Watkins and Claire Richards, respectively, whilst all five members perform the middle eight. The chorus also features all five voices.

== Reception ==
Jon O'Brien wrote for AllMusic and in two different reviews he noted "Deeper Shade of Blue" is a "club potential", and the Sleaze Sisters remix is "realized on a Sash-esque trance remix". O'Brien also commented it is "Italo house-inspired" and it "fits right in with the current retro-dance revival" in 2011. Lucas Villa from AXS described the song as a "futuristic club banger", adding that the group "battled the love blues atop pulsating house music beats with Richards' out-of-this-world vocals channeling the dance floor divas that came before her." He also stated that the song "remains the band's fiercest, most flawless effort." Can't Stop the Pop called it "a total mood-piece", noting that "the thumping club beat creates a brooding darkness that was quite unlike anything Steps had attempted before."

The song was referenced by Dave Benson Phillips during a celebrity edition of the CBBC game show Get Your Own Back when group members Lisa Scott-Lee and Ian "H" Watkins competed against each other, and the loser (H) was thrown in the Gunk Dunk at the end of the episode. After H's shocked reaction to being gunked, Benson Phillips remarked "As you can tell, H has gone a deeper shade of blue" before H splashed him.

== Music video ==
The music video has a futuristic style, with the group wearing blue and red latex uniforms with red latex gloves with the girls wearing blue latex hats for the dance sequences and each transforming into a darker alter ego during the video. The alter egos are to show the darker side of life that the song talks about.

== Track listings ==
UK CD single

1. "Deeper Shade of Blue" (radio edit) – 3:45
2. "Deeper Shade of Blue" (W.I.P. mix) – 6:47
3. "Deeper Shade of Blue" (Sleaze Sisters Anthem mix) – 7:54
4. "Deeper Shade of Blue" (video) – 3:50

UK cassette single

1. "Deeper Shade of Blue" (radio edit) – 3:45
2. "Deeper Shade of Blue" (W.I.P. mix) – 6:47

European CD single

1. "Deeper Shade of Blue" (Kiss W.I.P. remix) – 3:59
2. "Deeper Shade of Blue" (radio edit) – 3:45

European maxi-CD single

1. "Deeper Shade of Blue" (Kiss W.I.P. remix) – 3:59
2. "Deeper Shade of Blue" (radio edit) – 3:45
3. "Deeper Shade of Blue" (W.I.P. mix) – 6:47
4. "Deeper Shade of Blue" (Sleaze Sisters Anthem mix) – 7:54
5. "Deeper Shade of Blue" (Blockbuster Dirt Blue Klub mix) – 6:49

Record Store Day UK Zoetrope picture-disc single

1. "Deeper Shade of Blue" (Sleazesisters Anthem mix)
2. "Deeper Shade of Blue" (W.I.P. mix)
3. "Deeper Shade of Blue" (Blockster Dirt Blue Klub mix)
4. "Deeper Shade of Blue" (Project K's Hacienda mix)
5. "Deeper Shade of Blue" (Flashmob mix)
6. "Deeper Shade of Blue" (Steps 25 Revisited mix)

== Credits and personnel ==
Credits are adapted from the liner notes of Steptacular.

Recording

- Recorded at PWL Studios (London and Manchester, England)
- Additionally recorded at The Workhouse Studios and Sarm East (London, England)
- Mixed at PWL Studios (London and Manchester, England)
- Mastered at Transfermation (London, England)

Personnel

- Songwriting – Mark Topham, Karl Twigg
- Production – Mark Topham, Karl Twigg, Pete Waterman
- Mixing – Tim "Spag" Speight
- Engineering – Chris McDonnell, Tim "Spag" Speight
- Drums – Chris McDonnell
- Keyboards – Karl Twigg
- Guitar – Mark Topham
- Bass – Mark Topham

== Charts ==
=== Weekly charts ===
Chart (2000)	Peak position
Belgium (Ultratop 50 Flanders)	36
Europe (Eurochart Hot 100)	21
Ireland (IRMA)	24
Scottish Singles Sales (Official Charts)	4
UK Singles (Official Charts)	4
UK Airplay (Music Week)	32
UK Indie (Official Charts)	2

Chart (2024)	Peak position
UK Singles Downloads (Official Charts)	91

=== Year-end charts ===
Chart (2000)	Position
UK Singles (OCC)	82

== Certifications ==
Region	Certification	Certified units/sales
United Kingdom (BPI)	Silver	200,000^{‡}
^{‡} Sales+streaming figures based on certification alone.
