= Say You'll Be Mine (Steps song) =

1999 single by Steps

Single by Steps

from the album Steptacular
- A-side: "Better the Devil You Know"; (double A-side)
- Released: 13 December 1999
- Studio: PWL (London and Manchester, England)
- Genre: Pop
- Length: 3:32
- Label: Jive, Ebul
- Songwriters: Mark Topham, Karl Twigg, Lance Ellington
- Producers: Andrew Frampton, Pete Waterman

Steps singles chronology
"After the Love Has Gone" (1999)	"Say You'll Be Mine" / "Better the Devil You Know" (1999)	"Deeper Shade of Blue" (2000)

Music video
- "Say You'll Be Mine" on YouTube

"Say You'll Be Mine" is a song by British dance-pop group Steps, released as a double A-side with a cover version of Kylie Minogue's "Better the Devil You Know". Steps' cover of "Better the Devil You Know" was later included as the opening track on their third studio album, Buzz (2000), but did not serve as a lead single. A limited-edition single was released as a digipack that was included with a doubled-sided poster in the sleeve. The song is the first to feature all five members on lead vocals.

"Say You'll Be Mine" / "Better the Devil You Know" was released on 13 December 1999 and reached number four on the UK Singles Chart in January 2000. The double A-side also reached the top 40 in Australia and Ireland. A new Matt Pop's Old Skool Mix was included on the remix album Stomp All Night: The Remix Anthology as the first track on the second disc.

== Critical reception ==
Scottish newspaper Aberdeen Evening Express noted that "this is the first track where the Stepsters all take turns on lead." They added, "The instantly catchy singalong fest has a mature feel and is a dead cert to get you bopping this winter." Lucas Villa from AXS stated that Steps was at "its most adorable" on the "sweet" pop tune "Say You'll Be Mine". Can't Stop the Pop described it as "fascinating" and "one of their most brilliantly uplifting songs", adding that the track is "bursting at the seams with subtly catchy hooks." Also they noted that it is their first song to feature all five members of the group on lead vocals.

== Chart performance ==
In the United Kingdom, "Say You'll Be Mine" / "Better the Devil You Know" entered the UK Singles Chart at number seven on 19 December 1999 and peaked at number four for two weeks in January 2000, becoming Steps' sixth consecutive top-five hit and spending 18 weeks on the chart. The double A-side also reached the top 20 in Ireland, peaking at number 13. Elsewhere in Europe, the single reached number seven in Hungary, entered the top 50 in Flanders and the Netherlands, and appeared within the top 100 in Germany and Switzerland. On the Eurochart Hot 100, the single peaked at number 19 on the issue dated 22 January 2000. In Australia, the double A-side charted for eight weeks, peaking at number 21 on the week of its debut, 30 January 2000.

== Music video ==
A music video was made for "Say You'll Be Mine", directed by David Amphlett. He also directed the videos for "Tragedy" and "Heartbeat". It features the band acting out different Hollywood films. H and Claire act out Romeo + Juliet, H and Faye act out Austin Powers: International Man of Mystery, H and Lisa act out Titanic, Lee and Claire act out There's Something About Mary, Lee and Faye act out Batman Returns and Lee and Lisa act out Armageddon. The group members also wear gold-coloured outfits while performing a dance routine.

== Track listings ==
UK and Australian CD single

1. "Say You'll Be Mine" – 3:32
2. "Better the Devil You Know" – 3:49
3. "Better the Devil You Know" (2T's 2 Go mix) – 5:43

UK cassette single and European CD single

1. "Say You'll Be Mine" – 3:32
2. "Better the Devil You Know" – 3:49

== Credits and personnel ==
Credits are adapted from the liner notes of Steptacular.

Recording

- Recorded at PWL Studios (London and Manchester, England)
- Additionally recorded at The Workhouse Studios and Sarm East (London, England)
- Mixed at PWL Studios (London and Manchester, England)
- Mastered at Transfermation (London, England)

Personnel

- Songwriting – Mark Topham, Karl Twigg, Lance Ellington
- Production – Dan Frampton, Pete Waterman
- Mixing – Dan Frampton
- Engineering – Dan Frampton
- Drums – Pete Waterman
- Keyboards – Andrew Frampton
- Guitar – Greg Bone
- Bass – Dan Frampton

== Charts ==
=== Weekly charts ===
Chart (1999–2000)	Peak position
Australia (ARIA)	21
Belgium (Ultratop 50 Flanders)	42
Europe (Eurochart Hot 100)	19
Germany (GfK)	98
Hungary (Mahasz)	7
Ireland (IRMA)	13
Netherlands (Single Top 100)	47
Scottish Singles Sales (Official Charts)	3
Switzerland (Schweizer Hitparade)	93
UK Singles (Official Charts)	4
UK Airplay (Music Week)	32
UK Indie (Official Charts)	1

=== Year-end charts ===
Chart (1999)	Position
UK Singles (OCC)	102

Chart (2000)	Position
UK Singles (OCC)	170
