= Steps (pop group) =

British dance-pop group

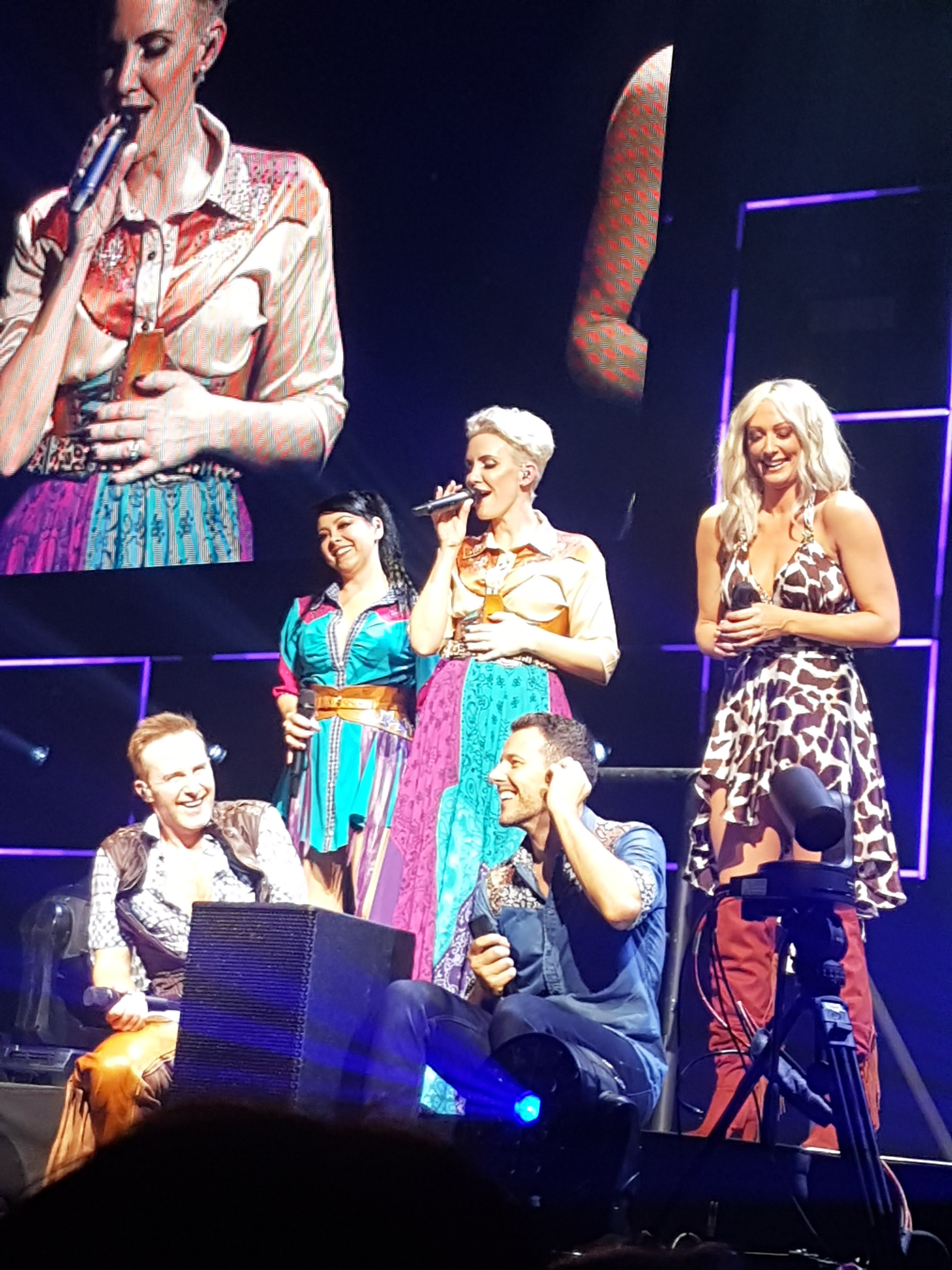
- Steps in 2017 (L–R): Watkins, Scott-Lee, Richards, Latchford-Evans, and Tozer

Background information
- Origin: London, United Kingdom
- Genres: Pop, dance-pop
- Works: Discography; songs
- Years active: 1997–2001; 2011–2012; 2017–present
- Labels: Jive; Sony; Steps; Warner; Absolute; Fascination; Polydor; Universal; BMG; LiveHereNow
- Spinoffs: H & Claire
- Members: Lee Latchford-Evans; Claire Richards; Lisa Scott-Lee; Faye Tozer; Ian "H" Watkins
- Website: stepsofficial.co.uk

Steps are a British dance-pop group formed in 1997, consisting of Lee Latchford-Evans, Claire Richards, Lisa Scott-Lee, Faye Tozer and Ian "H" Watkins. Their name refers to the dance routines accompanying their songs.

The group released three studio albums during their initial run: Step One (1998), Steptacular (1999), and Buzz (2000). They achieved 14 consecutive UK top-five singles, including the number one hits "Heartbeat"/"Tragedy" and "Stomp". Steptacular and the compilation Gold: Greatest Hits (2001) topped the UK Albums Chart. Steps disbanded in December 2001 following the departures of Richards and Watkins.

Steps reunited in 2011 for the documentary series Steps: Reunion and released the UK number one compilation The Ultimate Collection, followed by Light Up the World (2012). After a hiatus, they returned with Tears on the Dancefloor (2017) and the Party on the Dancefloor Tour, followed by What the Future Holds (2020) and What the Future Holds Pt. 2 (2021).

Steps have sold over 22 million singles and 15 million albums worldwide. With Platinum Collection (2022), they became the first British mixed-gender group to achieve a UK number one album in four consecutive decades. Their songs form the basis of the jukebox musical Here & Now, which premiered in Birmingham in November 2024.

== History ==
=== 1997–1999: Formation and Step One ===
Steps were formed by songwriters Steve Crosby and Barry Upton, who wrote "5,6,7,8", and manager Tim Byrne through auditions for a line dancing pop group advertised in The Stage newspaper. The original line-up comprised Ian "H" Watkins, Lisa Scott-Lee, Derek O'Brien, Maddy Chan and Mitch Stevens. O'Brien, Chan and Stevens left over concerns about the group's long-term prospects. Further auditions led to the selection of Claire Richards, Faye Tozer and Lee Latchford-Evans. Richards was told that her place in the group was conditional on losing weight. Tim Byrne and Victoria Blood, formerly BMG's head of marketing and video, founded Byrne Blood, which took over management. Steps signed with Jive Records and Pete Waterman, whose goal was to make the group "Abba on speed". Steps were originally signed for a one-single deal.

The group's name reflected a marketing concept in which instructions for the dance routine featured in their music video would be included with their single's CD sleeves. Their debut single, "5,6,7,8", was a techno line dance song. Though it peaked at number 14 on the UK Singles Chart, it remained on the chart for more than four months and became one of the best-selling singles of the 1990s. It reached number one in Australia in 1998.

Steps released a second single, a cover of Bananarama's "Last Thing on My Mind", in April 1998. It became their first UK top ten, peaking at number six. "One for Sorrow", released in August 1998, peaked at number two and began a run of 14 consecutive UK top-five singles. Their debut album, Step One, entered the UK Albums Chart at number two and was certified five times platinum.

In November 1998, Steps released the double A-side "Heartbeat"/"Tragedy", pairing an original song with a cover of the Bee Gees hit. It entered the UK chart at number two before reaching number one in January 1999, becoming the group's first UK number-one single and their biggest-selling release. Its continued success delayed the release of "Better Best Forgotten", the final single from Step One, by nearly two months. That single also reached number two.

At the 1999 Brit Awards, Steps performed the ABBA medley "Thank ABBA for the Music" with Tina Cousins, Cleopatra, B*Witched, and Billie. Released as a single in March, it reached number four in the UK. Steps were also nominated for Best British Newcomer, an award voted for by BBC Radio 1 listeners. Waterman claimed he had been told before the ceremony that Steps had won, but the award went to Belle & Sebastian. The result prompted allegations of organised voting at the University of Strathclyde, although the organisers denied any foul play.

=== 1999–2001: Steptacular and Buzz ===
In July 1999, Steps released "Love's Got a Hold on My Heart", the lead single from their second album, which reached number two in the UK. The group supported Britney Spears on the North American leg of her ...Baby One More Time Tour. In October 1999, Steps released their second album, Steptacular. It reached number one in the UK and was certified four times platinum. Its additional singles included "After the Love Has Gone", "Say You'll Be Mine"/"Better the Devil You Know" and "Deeper Shade of Blue", all of which reached the UK top five.

A remix of "One for Sorrow" by Tony Moran appeared on the soundtrack to Drive Me Crazy (1999) and became their debut US single. It entered the Billboard Hot Dance Club Play chart's top 40, becoming their only single to enter any US Billboard chart. A North American edition of Step One combined tracks from their first two albums. Alongside boy band Youngstown, Steps taped a Disney Channel concert special that aired in February 2000.

Steps received the award for Best Selling Live Act at the 2000 Brit Awards. Richards and Watkins also began presenting the BBC One talent show Steps to the Stars, which premiered in February 2000 and ran for two series.

In July, they released the double A-side "When I Said Goodbye"/"Summer of Love", with the latter song also appearing on their third album, Buzz (2000). "Stomp" became Steps' second number one single in October 2000. Buzz followed later that month and was certified double platinum in the UK. The group worked with many American and Swedish producers who had created hits for other Jive artists such as Britney Spears, 'N Sync, and the Backstreet Boys. The members also had their first opportunity to contribute to the group's songwriting, with each invited to choose a collaborator; Tozer worked with Cyndi Lauper. Further singles from the album included "It's the Way You Make Me Feel", which reached number two in January 2001, and the double A-side "Here and Now"/"You'll Be Sorry", released in May.

=== 2001–2010: Gold, disbandment and solo projects ===
The announcement of Gold: Greatest Hits prompted speculation that Steps would disband, which the group repeatedly denied. The compilation was preceded by "Chain Reaction", a cover of the Diana Ross song, and followed by the UK top-five single "Words Are Not Enough"/"I Know Him So Well".

Steps announced their split on 26 December 2001. The announcement drew criticism from fans who felt misled by the group's earlier denials and the release of merchandise before Christmas. Although the group's official statement said they wanted to end on a high, Watkins and Richards later revealed that they had left on the final night of the Gold: Greatest Hits tour because they were unhappy within the group.

Jive released The Last Dance, a compilation of remixes, B-sides and rarities, in 2002. It reached number 57 on the UK Albums Chart. A collection of the group's first two albums was reissued in 2007 to mark their tenth anniversary.

Following the split, members pursued individual projects. Watkins and Richards formed the duo H & Claire and released Another You Another Me in 2002. That same year, Tozer had a UK top-ten hit with "Someone like You", a duet with Russell Watson. Scott-Lee launched a solo career with the UK number-six single "Lately" in 2003. In 2007, Latchford-Evans released "Miracle" with the Latch. Two years later, he suggested that a Steps reunion was possible; however, suggested it was not the "right time" for it to take place.

=== 2011–2016: Reunion, Light Up the World and hiatus ===
In early 2011, rumours began circulating that the group would reunite for a TV series and a one-off concert to mark the tenth anniversary of their 2001 split. The reunion was denied by band's members. Richards commented that a Steps reunion would be "silly" but added that she would "never say never". Contrary to these claims, in July 2011, Steps announced that they would reunite for Steps: Reunion, a four-part documentary series on Sky Living, and release the greatest hits album The Ultimate Collection. The series premiered on 28 September and explored the circumstances of their split, tensions between the members and their plans for the group's future.

In October, Steps confirmed that the reunion would continue beyond the documentary and announced the Ultimate Tour, an arena tour scheduled for 2012. Additionally, they announced a date at Newmarket Racecourse's Summer Saturdays. The Ultimate Collection, which included a newly recorded cover of ABBA's "Dancing Queen", became their third UK number one album. The group embarked on the Ultimate Tour in 2012. A concert film, Steps – The Ultimate Tour Live, was released in October and reached number one on the UK Music Video Chart the following month.

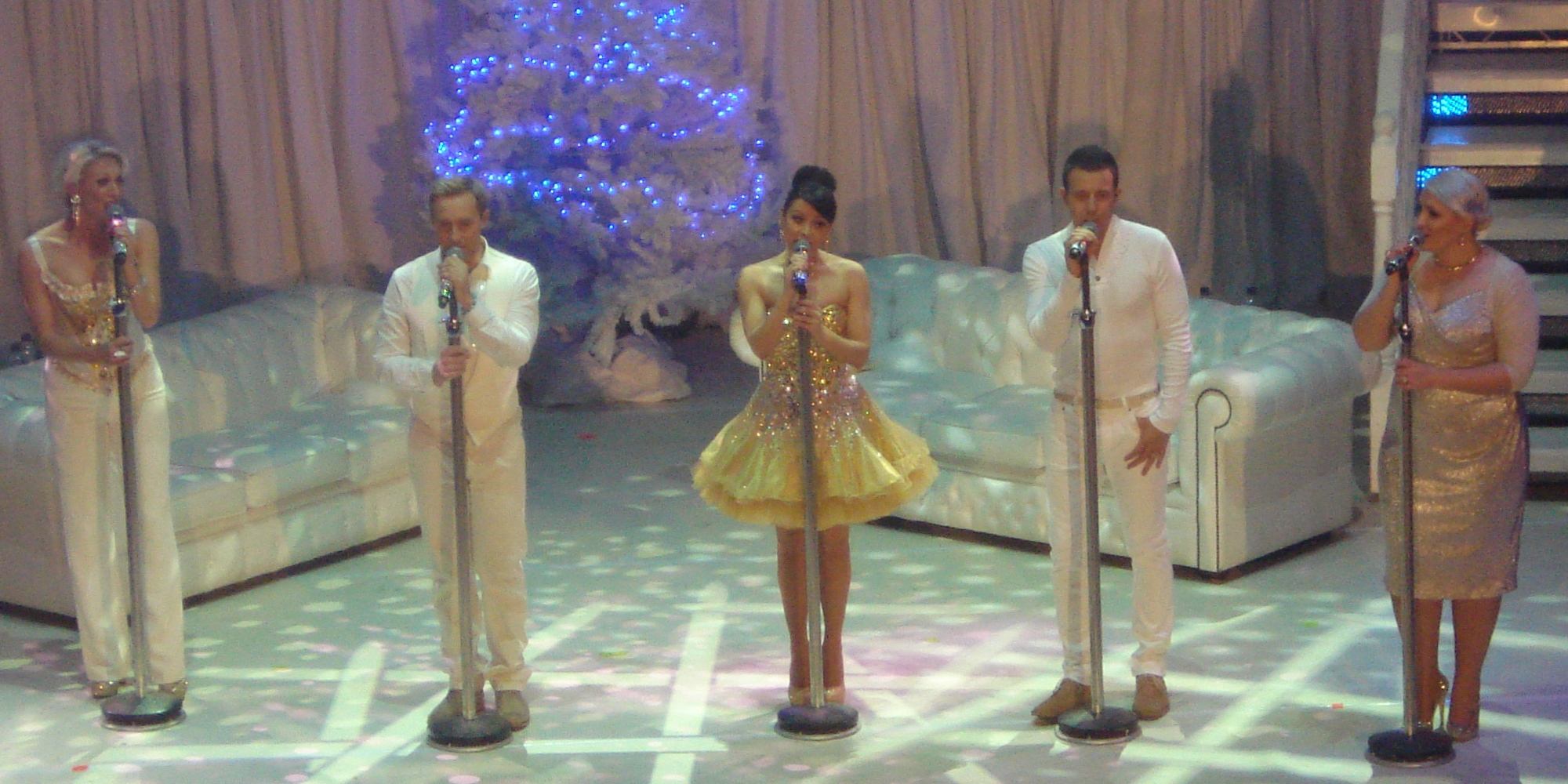
Steps performing live on their Christmas with Steps tour at the Manchester Apollo in December 2012

In November 2012, Steps released their fourth studio album, Light Up the World, a collection of Christmas songs preceded by its title track as the lead single. They supported the album with the six-date Christmas with Steps tour in November and December.

In May 2013, the group announced a hiatus following their touring commitments the previous year, emphasising that they had not disbanded. The members pursued individual projects during the break. A new compilation entitled 5,6,7,8: The Collection was released in November 2015, followed by Stomp All Night: The Remix Anthology in 2016.

=== 2017–2021: Tears on the Dancefloor and What the Future Holds Parts 1 & 2 ===
Steps returned in 2017 to mark their twentieth anniversary. Their fifth studio album, Tears on the Dancefloor, was released in April and reached number two in the UK. Steps released Tears on the Dancefloor independently after record companies declined to support the project, working with Absolute Label Services. Preceded by the single "Scared of the Dark", the album was certified gold. A deluxe edition of the album, Tears on the Dancefloor: Crying at the Disco, followed in October. Steps also embarked on the Party on the Dancefloor Tour in 2017, which shifted 200,000 tickets across 22 sold-out dates. The group continued performing together with the Summer of Steps tour in 2018, having confirmed that their reunion would extend beyond the anniversary celebrations. Richards confirmed that Steps would begin work on a new album following the summer tour.

Their sixth studio album, What the Future Holds, was released in November 2020. Steps partnered with BMG Rights Management. Its singles included the title track, written by Sia and Greg Kurstin, "Something in Your Eyes" and "To the Beat of My Heart". In 2021, Steps announced What the Future Holds Pt. 2, which had developed from a planned deluxe edition into a separate album. Its singles included a reworked version of "Heartbreak in This City" featuring Michelle Visage, "Take Me for a Ride", a cover of Five Star's "The Slightest Touch", and the Darren Hayes-penned "A Hundred Years of Winter".

The group began the What the Future Holds Tour in November 2021, with Sophie Ellis-Bextor as the support act. The remaining dates were postponed later that month after musicians and crew members tested positive for COVID-19.

=== 2022–present: 25th anniversary and musical ===
Steps marked their twenty-fifth anniversary in 2022 with a series of summer shows, including a headline performance at Mighty Hoopla, and the greatest hits album Platinum Collection. Released in August, the album included the single "Hard 2 Forget", a cover of Vincint's song. It became their fourth UK number one album, making Steps the first British mixed-gender group to top the albums chart in four consecutive decades.

In February 2024, the group's first three studio albums, Step One, Steptacular and Buzz, were released on vinyl for the first time.

Here & Now, a jukebox musical featuring the group's songs, premiered at The Alexandra in Birmingham in November 2024. The musical was produced by Steps, theatre company ROYO and Pete Waterman. A UK and Ireland tour was subsequently announced for 2025–2026. Plans are being discussed to mark thirty years since their debut in 1997.

== Musical style and reception ==
Steps' music combines dance-pop with ballads and has frequently drawn comparisons with ABBA. Writing for the Official Charts Company, Justin Myers attributed these comparisons to their combination of melancholy songs and energetic dance rhythms. "Deeper Shade of Blue" marked a move towards a more club-oriented sound, which continued on Buzz. Reviewing What the Future Holds, musicOMH's Nick Smith noted its combination of the group's established dance-pop, ABBA-style harmonies and ballads with atmospheric electronic production.

The group's visual identity incorporated coordinated costumes and dance routines designed for audiences to follow. Richards performed many of the lead vocals during their early career; Smith noted a more even distribution of solo passages among the five members on What the Future Holds.

Despite their commercial success, Steps faced criticism during their early career, with reviewers dismissing their music as disposable pop. In a retrospective interview with Classic Pop, Richards recalled frustration at the lack of recognition from the music industry despite the group's record sales and arena tours. The magazine contrasted this early reception with the more favourable response to their 2017 comeback, which Tozer said had surprised the group.

Steps have attracted a substantial LGBTQ following. In a 2021 interview with Attitude, Tozer credited LGBTQ fans with providing enduring support, while she and Watkins described their intention to create a welcoming environment in which audiences could express themselves freely. Steps received the Icon Award at the 2021 Attitude Awards.

== Awards and nominations ==
Award	Year	Category	Nominee(s)	Result	Ref.
Brit Awards	1999	British Breakthrough Act	Themselves	Nominated	
Brit Awards	2000	Best Selling Live Act of 1999	Themselves	Won	
Brit Awards	2000	British Pop Act	Themselves	Nominated	
Brit Awards	2001	British Pop Act	Themselves	Nominated	
British LGBT Awards	2022	Music Artist	Themselves	Won	
TV Hits Awards	1999	Best Live Band	Themselves	Won	
TV Hits Awards	1999	Best Video/Song of the Year 1999	"Love's Got a Hold on My Heart"	Won	
TMF Awards	1999	Best Group	Themselves	Won	
Disney Channel Kids Awards	1999	Band of the Year	Themselves	Won	
Disney Channel Kids Awards	2001	Band of the Year	Themselves	Won	
MTV Europe Music Awards	1998	MTV Select — UK and Ireland	Themselves	Nominated	
Music Week Awards	2023	Catalogue Marketing Campaign	Themselves	Nominated	
Popjustice £20 Music Prize	2017	Best British Pop Single	"Scared of the Dark"	Nominated	
The Record of the Year	1998	Record of the Year	"One for Sorrow"	Nominated	
Smash Hits Poll Winners Party	2001	Best Live Act	Themselves	Won	
Smash Hits Poll Winners Party	2001	Hall of Fame	Themselves	Won	
Virgin Atlantic Attitude Awards	2021	Icon Award	Themselves	Won	

== Discography ==
- Step One (1998)
- Steptacular (1999)
- Buzz (2000)
- Light Up the World (2012)
- Tears on the Dancefloor (2017)
- What the Future Holds (2020)
- What the Future Holds Pt. 2 (2021)

== Tours ==
=== Headlining ===
- Step One Tour (1999)
- Next Step Tour (1999)
- Steptacular Tour (2000)
- Steps into Christmas (2000)
- Gold Tour (2001)
- The Ultimate Tour (2012)
- Christmas with Steps (2012)
- Party on the Dancefloor Tour (2017)
- Summer of Steps Tour (2018)
- What the Future Holds Tour (2021)
- 25th Anniversary Summer Tour (2022)
- Steps 30 Live (2027)

=== Opening act ===
- ...Baby One More Time Tour (opened for Britney Spears) (1999)

== See also ==
- Pete Waterman Entertainment
- RCA/Jive Label Group
- Sony BMG
- Stock Aitken Waterman
