= Love's Got a Hold on My Heart =

1999 single by Steps

Single by Steps

from the album Steptacular
- B-side: "To Be Your Hero"
- Released: 12 July 1999
- Studio: PWL (London and Manchester, England)
- Genre: Pop
- Length: 3:19
- Label: Jive; Ebul
- Songwriters: Andrew Frampton; Pete Waterman
- Producers: Andrew Frampton; Pete Waterman

Steps singles chronology
"Thank ABBA for the Music" (1999)	"Love's Got a Hold on My Heart" (1999)	"After the Love Has Gone" (1999)

Music video
- "Love's Got a Hold on My Heart" on YouTube

"Love's Got a Hold on My Heart" is a song by British pop music group Steps. It was written and produced by Andrew Frampton and Pete Waterman, and released in July 1999 by Jive and Ebul Records as the lead single from the band's second album, Steptacular (1999). It features group members Faye Tozer and Claire Richards on lead vocals. The single peaked at number two in the United Kingdom and became a top-20 hit in Finland, Flanders, Ireland, and New Zealand. Its accompanying music video was directed by Dani Jacobs and filmed in Cannes, France.

== Critical reception ==
Can't Stop the Pop stated that "the one thing that immediately jumps out with this single – from that first keyboard whizz in the intro – is how summery it sounds. The track is not without a trademark hint of melodrama, but on the whole, it’s a much lighter production which exudes sunshine and warmth." They added that the chorus is "deceptively – and enduringly – catchy." Scottish newspaper Daily Record said it is "their best tune yet. A Europop sound, ABBA-tinged melody and they even supply the dance moves on the CD box". They also wrote, "This song sounds like the band looks - cheesy. The tune pops along using all the right ingredients to make sure you're tapping your feet."

== Chart performance ==
The single missed out at number one on the UK Singles Chart, losing out to Latin pop singer Ricky Martin, who spent a second week at the top with "Livin' La Vida Loca". Spending 12 weeks on the British charts, this single is the group's only single to fall off the charts for two consecutive weeks and then re-enter. The song did reach number one on the Scottish Singles Chart, conversely preventing "Livin' la Vida Loca" from reaching the top spot. "Love's Got a Hold on My Heart" also peaked at number nine in Finland and Ireland, number 14 in the Flanders region of Belgium, number 18 in New Zealand, and number 29 in Australia.

== Music video ==
The music video for "Love's Got a Hold on My Heart", shot in Cannes in the South of France, was directed by British music video director and editor Dani Jacobs. The main plot sees the group chase a man who has stolen the film reel for the fictitious "Steps: The Movie", interspersed with clips of the band performing the dance routine on a jetty dressed in yellow outfits.

== Track listings ==
- UK CD1
1. "Love's Got a Hold on My Heart" – 3:19
2. "Love's Got a Hold on My Heart" (W.I.P. Off the Wall mix) – 6:12
3. "To Be Your Hero" – 3:49
- UK CD2
1. "Love's Got a Hold on My Heart" – 3:19
2. "Love's Got a Hold on My Heart" (instrumental) – 3:20
3. "Last Thing on My Mind" (Wip't Up in the Disco mix instrumental) – 5:41
- UK cassette single
1. "Love's Got a Hold on My Heart" – 3:19
2. "To Be Your Hero" – 3:49
- Australian, New Zealand, and Japanese CD single
1. "Love's Got a Hold on My Heart" – 3:19
2. "Love's Got a Hold on My Heart" (WIP Off the Wall mix) – 6:12
3. "To Be Your Hero" – 3:49
4. "Last Thing on My Mind" (WIP't UP the Disco mix instrumental) – 5:41
5. "Love's Got a Hold on My Heart" (instrumental) – 3:20

== Credits and personnel ==
=== A-side: "Love's Got a Hold on My Heart" ===
Credits are adapted are from the liner notes of Steptacular.

Recording

- Recorded at PWL Studios (London and Manchester, England)
- Additionally recorded at The Workhouse Studios and Sarm East (London, England)
- Mixed at PWL Studios (London and Manchester, England)
- Mastered at Transfermation (London, England)

Personnel

- Songwriting – Andrew Frampton, Pete Waterman
- Production – Dan Frampton, Pete Waterman
- Mixing – Dan Frampton
- Engineering – Dan Frampton
- Drums – Pete Waterman
- Keyboards – Andrew Frampton
- Guitar – Dan Frampton
- Bass – Andrew Frampton

=== B-side: "To Be Your Hero" ===
Credits are adapted from the liner notes of "Love's Got a Hold on My Heart".

Recording

- Recorded at PWL Studios (London and Manchester, England)
- Mixed at PWL Studios (London and Manchester, England)
- Mastered at Transfermation (London, England)

Personnel

- Songwriting – Dan Frampton, Pete Waterman
- Production – Dan Frampton, Pete Waterman
- Mixing – Dan Frampton, Paul Waterman
- Engineering – Dan Frampton

== Charts ==
=== Weekly charts ===
Chart (1999)	Peak position
Australia (ARIA)	29
Belgium (Ultratop 50 Flanders)	14
Europe (Eurochart Hot 100)	12
Finland (Suomen virallinen lista)	9
Ireland (IRMA)	9
Netherlands (Dutch Top 40 Tipparade)	9
Netherlands (Single Top 100)	58
New Zealand (Recorded Music NZ)	18
Scotland Singles (Official Charts)	1
UK Singles (Official Charts)	2
UK Airplay (Music Week)	22
UK Indie (Official Charts)	1

=== Year-end charts ===
Chart (1999)	Position
UK Singles (OCC)	62

== Certifications ==
Region	Certification	Certified units/sales
United Kingdom (BPI)	Silver	200,000^{^}
^{^} Shipments figures based on certification alone.

== Release history ==
Region	Date	Format(s)	Label(s)	Ref.
United Kingdom	12 July 1999	CD; cassette	Jive; Ebul	
Japan	22 September 1999	CD	Jive; Avex Trax	
