= Lance Ellington =

English musician (born 1957)

- Born: 22 June 1957 (age 68)
- Origin: London, England
- Genres: Pop; vocal jazz; swing; dance; soul
- Occupations: Singer; songwriter; actor
- Years active: 1980s–present
- Label: Various

Lance Ellington (born 22 June 1957) is an English singer, songwriter and actor.

Ellington, the only son of the band leader Ray Ellington and actress and TV presenter Anita West, specialises in swing and big ballads. He has worked with many artists including Sting, George Michael, Gloria Gaynor, Steps, Michael Jackson and Robbie Williams, and currently makes regular performances on the BBC programme Strictly Come Dancing.

== Career ==
After leaving school, Ellington entered and won the 1977 final of the television talent show New Faces as a member of the duo Koffee 'n' Kreme with singing partner Beth Hannah. He followed this with a tour with Johnny Mathis and a performance in the Royal Variety Show. His career continued as a session singer with many top artists and working on several albums. He went on to sing "Love You Too" the main theme song for Lee Van Cleef's last movie Thieves of Fortune (1988).

In 1993 his single, "Lonely (Have We Lost Our Love)", peaked at number 57 in the UK Singles Chart. Ellington's solo career includes studio albums, stage and club appearances and writing songs for Steps and Westlife. In 2004, he appeared as his late father in the film The Life and Death of Peter Sellers and, in 1993, sang a duet with Cathy Dennis on the soundtrack of Robin Hood: Men in Tights. In 2012, Ellington was the resident vocalist on Strictly Come Dancing. In the same year he featured with Mary Carewe as a soloist in the James Bond 50th Anniversary Gala Concert, which was broadcast on BBC Radio 4 and shown on BBC television in December 2012.

== Personal life ==
Ellington has two daughters, Lauren and Lois who have both performed in West End productions.

== Discography ==
=== Albums ===
- Pleasure and Pain – A&M Records (1990)
- Lessons in Love – Vocalion Records (2005)
- There Comes A Time – Artemis Records (2007)
- Aspects of Ellington – Upbeat Recordings (2012)

=== Singles and EPs ===
- "Love Scared" – A&M Records (1990)
- "Treat Me Right" – A&M Records (1990)
- "Love Me More" – A&M Records (12") (1990)
- "Don't Ever Leave Me Again" – A&M Records (12", Promo) (1990)
- "I'm Falling Too" (12") – Club House featuring Lance Ellington – Media Records (1992)
- "Lonely (Have We Lost Our Love)" – RCA Records (1993) – UK No. 57
- "Gimme Love" – Media Records Ltd (1994) - Uk No. 80
- "Gimme Love" / "Change The Way" (12") – Lance Ellington / Maria Short – Pro DJ International (1994)
- "Lonely '96" – East Side Records (1996)

=== Miscellaneous ===
- EVO (15) featuring Lance Ellington – "Summer Beach" (CD promo) – Interscope Digital Distribution (2011)
- He sang backing vocals on the song The Golden Boy recorded in 1987 for the album Barcelona with Freddie Mercury and Montserrat Caballé.
