= One for Sorrow (song) =

1998 single by Steps

- CD2 cover

Single by Steps

from the album Step One
- B-side: "Too Weak to Resist"
- Released: 24 August 1998
- Studio: PWL (London and Manchester, England)
- Genre: Dance-pop; hi-NRG; bubblegum dance (remix)
- Length: 4:20
- Label: Jive; Ebul
- Songwriters: Mark Topham; Karl Twigg; Lance Ellington
- Producers: Mark Topham; Karl Twigg; Pete Waterman

Steps singles chronology
"Last Thing on My Mind" (1998)	"One for Sorrow" (1998)	"Heartbeat" / "Tragedy" (1998)

Music videos
- "One for Sorrow" on YouTube; "One for Sorrow" (remix) on YouTube

"One for Sorrow" is a song by British pop-dance group Steps, released in August 1998 by Jive and Ebul as the third single from their debut album, Step One (1998). The song was written by Mark Topham, Karl Twigg and Lance Ellington, and it was produced by Topham and Twigg with Pete Waterman. It became Steps' first single to reach the top five of the UK Singles Chart, peaking at number two and spending 11 weeks on the chart. A remixed version became their debut US single in 1999 and reached number 38 on the Billboard Dance Club Play chart in October 1999. Two different music videos were produced to accompany the single: one for the original version and one for the remix.

== Release ==
Unlike Steps' previous single "Last Thing on My Mind", which featured solo vocals by all three women, Claire Richards performs lead vocals on all of the verses, harmonising with Faye Tozer, before the entire group join in for the chorus.

On 29 July 2015, Richards premiered a new solo acoustic version of the track at an event celebrating Pete Waterman's career at the Royal Festival Hall. This was her first solo single, and was released the following day via her official SoundCloud.

== Critical reception ==
AllMusic editor Jon O'Brien described the song as "melancholic dance-pop". Lucas Villa from AXS noted that Richards "took the song's tragic wordplay to church in a powerhouse performance." He added that it "stands as one of Steps' finest pop moments." Larry Flick from Billboard magazine wrote, "U.K. youth quintet Steps is all about conjuring up the timeless ABBA in its debut U.S. single, a joyous romp that will propel hands into the air and, with the proper push from Jive, send this song into the upper reaches of the pop charts—where it's already been across much of Europe. This U.S. mix is the tastiest kind of bubble gum, with a happy-go-lucky dance beat from production maestro Tony Moran; a solid, zippy vocal; and a sing-along chorus that sticks with maddening proficiency."

A reviewer from Birmingham Evening Mail commented, "The nearest thing you'll get to an ABBA tribute song in the top ten. This sounds just like the Swedes around the time their complex inter-band relationships were hitting a rocky patch." Can't Stop the Pop described "One for Sorrow" as a "brilliant moment in '90s pop music", adding that "this is pop music with a heart". They complimented Richard's vocals, stating that the track is "the perfect showcase for the power and range of her vocals." Scottish Daily Record stated, "It sounds like ABBA, but Steps prove they are the real thing with their biggest hit yet". Gary James from Entertainment Focus noted that "starting with the rain effect and gentle tickle of the piano, Claire's voice tells the tale of wanting love but getting uncertainity [sic] as it builds to a big power chorus." Sunday Mirror commented, "Pop's next big things crank up the ABBA again minus the beards thankfully."

== Chart performance ==
"One for Sorrow" reached number two in the United Kingdom on 30 August 1998, during its first week on the UK Singles Chart, and spent 11 weeks on the listing. The song reached number one in the Flanders region of Belgium and entered the top 10 in Ireland as well as on the Eurochart Hot 100. Outside Europe, "One for Sorrow" peaked at number 13 in New Zealand, number 26 on the Canadian RPM Dance 30 chart, and number 34 in Australia. In the US, the song peaked at number 38 on the Billboard Dance Club Play chart in October 1999.

== Music video ==
There were produced two different music videos for the song; one for the European market and one for the US market (the Tony Moran remix). The first one was filmed in Italy. In the beginning of the video, Claire performs alone inside a villa, standing by a window. Later the group performs in front of a field of sunflowers, as seen on the cover of the single.

== Legacy ==
In 2014, the Official UK Chart named "One for Sorrow" a "pop gem" and a "lovelorn classic", inducting the song in their "Pop Gem Hall of Fame". In 2018, The Guardian stated that "Steps put the fun in late-90s dysfunctional pop and their third single is glorious, its legacy has endured and cemented their pop phenomena status."

== Track listings ==
- UK CD1 and Australian CD single
1. "One for Sorrow" – 4:20
2. "One for Sorrow" (instrumental) – 4:20
3. "Too Weak to Resist" – 3:50
- UK CD2
1. "One for Sorrow" – 4:20
2. "One for Sorrow" (W.I.P. remix) – 6:53
3. "One for Sorrow" (a cappella mix) – 4:16
- UK cassette single
1. "One for Sorrow" – 4:20
2. "One for Sorrow" (W.I.P. remix) – 6:53
- European CD single
1. "One for Sorrow" – 4:20
2. "One for Sorrow" (instrumental) – 4:20
- US CD single
1. "One for Sorrow" (US mix) – 3:30
2. "One for Sorrow" (UK mix) – 4:22
- US 12-inch single

A1. "One for Sorrow" (Tony Moran's extended club) – 8:12
A2. "One for Sorrow" (original version) – 4:17
B1. "One for Sorrow" (Soul Solution extended vocal mix) – 5:05
B2. "One for Sorrow" (Pimp Juice's Summer Fung 12-inch) – 6:38

== Credits and personnel ==
Credits are adapted from the liner notes of Step One.

=== A-side: "One for Sorrow" ===
Recording

- Recorded at PWL Studios (London and Manchester, England)
- Mixed at PWL Studios (London and Manchester, England)
- Mastered at Transfermation (London, England)

Personnel

- Songwriting – Mark Topham, Karl Twigg, Lance Ellington
- Production – Mark Topham, Karl Twigg, Pete Waterman
- Mixing – Paul Waterman, Dan Frampton
- Engineering – Chris McDonnell
- Drums – Chris McDonnell
- Keyboards – Karl Twigg, Mark Topham

=== B-side: "Too Weak to Resist" ===
Recording

- Recorded at PWL Studios (London and Manchester, England)
- Mixed at PWL Studios (London and Manchester, England)
- Mastered at Transfermation (London, England)

Personnel

- Songwriting – Dan Frampton, Pete Waterman
- Production – Dan Frampton, Pete Waterman
- Mixing – Dan Frampton
- Engineering – Dan Frampton, Chris McDonnell
- Drums – Pete Waterman
- Additional keyboards – Karl Twigg
- Guitar – Greg Bone
- All other instruments – Andrew Frampton

== Charts ==
=== Weekly charts ===
Chart (1998–1999)	Peak position
Australia (ARIA)	34
Belgium (Ultratop 50 Flanders)	1
Belgium (Ultratop 50 Wallonia)	40
Canada Dance/Urban (RPM)	26
Estonia (Eesti Top 20)	6
Europe (Eurochart Hot 100)	10
Ireland (IRMA)	4
Netherlands (Dutch Top 40)	24
Netherlands (Single Top 100)	28
New Zealand (Recorded Music NZ)	13
Scottish Singles Sales (Official Charts)	2
Spain (Top 40 Radio)	39
Sweden (Sverigetopplistan)	34
UK Singles (Official Charts)	2
UK Airplay (Music Week)	29
UK Indie (Official Charts)	1
US Dance Club Songs (Billboard)	38

=== Year-end charts ===
Chart (1998)	Position
Belgium (Ultratop 50 Flanders)	14
UK Singles (OCC)	31

== Certifications ==
Region	Certification	Certified units/sales
United Kingdom (BPI)	Gold	423,000

== Release history ==
Region	Date	Format(s)	Label(s)	Ref.
United Kingdom	24 August 1998	CD; cassette	Jive; Ebul	
United States	3 August 1999	Rhythmic contemporary; contemporary hit radio	Jive; Ebul	
