= Last Thing on My Mind (Bananarama song) =

1992 single by Bananarama

Single by Bananarama

from the album Please Yourself
- B-side: "Another Lover"
- Released: 16 November 1992
- Length: 3:35
- Label: London
- Songwriters: Sara Dallin; Keren Woodward; Mike Stock; Pete Waterman
- Producers: Mike Stock; Pete Waterman

Bananarama singles chronology
"Movin' On" (1992)	"Last Thing on My Mind" (1992)	"More, More, More" (1993)

Music video
- "Last Thing on My Mind" on YouTube

"Last Thing on My Mind" is by the English girl group Bananarama from their sixth studio album, Please Yourself (1993). It was released on 16 November 1992 by London Records as the album's second single. The track was produced by Mike Stock and Pete Waterman, two-thirds of the Stock Aitken Waterman (SAW) trio. Waterman stated in 2002 the song was influenced by Mozart. The single peaked at number 72 on the UK Singles Chart. In 1998, British group Steps released a cover version of the song as a single, peaking at number six on the UK Singles Chart.

== Critical reception ==
Quentin Harrison from Albumism described the song as a "champagne pop-soul sparkler".

== Music video ==
A music video was made to accompany the song, directed by Zowie Broach. It features the two girls dressed in suits, ties, and gloves as they meet in a high-class European cafe where they chat, giggle, and whisper into each other's ears. These scenes are intercut with scenes of each of the girls being caressed or hugging a male companion in an upscale bedroom. The video ends with the two girls leaving together in a limousine.

== Track listings ==
- UK CD single
1. "Last Thing on My Mind" (7" Mix) – 3:34
2. "Another Lover" – 3:31
3. "Venus" (Extended) – 7:25
4. "I Heard a Rumour" (Horoscope Mix) – 5:53
- UK 7-inch single
1. "Last Thing on My Mind" – 3:35
2. "Another Lover" – 3:31

== Credits and personnel ==
=== Vocals ===
- Lead vocals – Sara Dallin, Keren Woodward
- Background vocals – Cleveland Watkiss, Lance Ellington, Leroy Osborne*, Mae McKenna, Mark Williamson, Mike Stock, Miriam Stockley

=== Personnel ===
- Production – Mike Stock, Pete Waterman
- Mixing – Dave Ford
- Engineer – Gordon Dennis, Peter Day
- Assistant engineer – Chris McDonnell, Dean Murphy, Jason Barron, Jesse Tranbury, Les Sharma, Martin Neary, Paul Waterman
- Additional engineer – Dillon Gallagher
- Drums – A. Linn
- Drums – Gary Miller
- Keyboards – Gary Miller, Julian Gingell, Mike Stock

Credits adapted from the liner notes of Please Yourself.

== Charts ==
Chart (1992–1993)	Peak position
Germany (GfK)	63
Netherlands (Dutch Top 40 Tipparade)	4
Netherlands (Single Top 100)	47
UK Singles (Official Charts)	71
UK Airplay (Music Week)	44

== Steps version ==
"Last Thing on My Mind"

Single by Steps

from the album Step One
- B-side: "A Love to Last"
- Released: 20 April 1998
- Studio: PWL (London and Manchester, England)
- Genre: Pop; disco
- Length: 3:04
- Label: Jive; EBUL
- Songwriters: Mike Stock; Pete Waterman; Sara Dallin; Keren Woodward
- Producers: Mark Topham; Karl Twigg; Pete Waterman

Steps singles chronology
"5,6,7,8" (1997)	"Last Thing on My Mind" (1998)	"One for Sorrow" (1998)

Music video
- "Last Thing on My Mind" on YouTube

British group Steps recorded a version of "Last Thing on My Mind" for their debut studio album, Step One (1998).

=== Background and release ===
Following the release of their debut single "5,6,7,8", "Last Thing on My Mind" was released as their next single and became their first top 10 in the United Kingdom. The song became the group's first top 10 single in the United Kingdom charting at number six, outselling and outpeaking the original version. The song was produced by Pete Waterman and lasts for a duration of three minutes and five seconds. The two main verses are performed by Faye and Claire, respectively, whilst Lisa performs the bridge, after the instrumental. The chorus is performed by the entire group, and the song features no solo male voice.

=== Critical reception ===
Andy Coleman from Birmingham Evening Mail wrote, "The single sounds like a nineties ABBA and the video even contains "tongue in cheek" references to the 1970s Swedish pop icons." Also another editor, Phil Gould, noted it as a "ABBA soundalike". Can't Stop the Pop described it as an "out-and-out party song" with "elements of disco heartbreak in the lyrics", adding that it "absolutely radiates joy". Geir Rakvaag from Norwegian Dagsavisen felt it "could have been made by ABBA". Julie MacCaskill from Scottish Daily Record stated that it is "wonderful". Gary James from Entertainment Focus described it as "pure pop heaven", adding, "although when you stop dancing and start listening to the lyrics it’s actually about an unexpected break up; classic Stock and Waterman."

Caroline Sullivan from The Guardian wrote that the track "aspires to ABBAesque melodrama". Music Week praised it as "addictive" and "nauseatingly brilliant". In a separate review, the magazine named it Single of the Week, adding, "This track - which gives more than a nod in the direction of Abba - is a welcome and surprisingly enjoyable diversion from the line-dancing pop sensation '5,6,7,8', which sold more than 300,000 units. It proves Steps are the Kings and Queens of boogie nights to come and, while it will find initially low support at radio, expect that trend to be reversed when they win even more fans over."

=== Commercial performance ===
"Last Thing on My Mind" debuted at number six on the UK Singles Chart on 26 April 1998, and after fluctuating inside the top 10 for three weeks, it re-peaked at number six in its fifth week. It spent a further week in the top 10, and collectively had a chart run of 14 consecutive weeks. Following their debut single "5,6,7,8" becoming their first top-40 entry, peaking at number 14 in November 1997, their subsequent 15 single releases all charted within the top 10, however "Last Thing on My Mind" was the only one to not make the top five prior to their split in 2001. "Last Thing on My Mind" is the fifth best selling song of Steps career, and it was certified gold by the British Phonographic Industry (BPI) on 21 January 2022 for sales and streams shipments of 400,000 units.

In continental Europe, the song debuted at number 41 in the Flanders region of Belgium on 9 May 1998. It jumped to number four the following week, and reached number one in its third week, a position it held for 10 consecutive weeks. In the Wallonia region, the song did not achieve the same success, peaking at number 16 in its second week, and remaining on the chart for five weeks. "Last Thing on My Mind" peaked at number 13 in the Netherlands, number 30 in France, and number 59 in Sweden. Elsewhere, the song peaked spent three non-consecutive weeks at number five in Australia, and peaked at number 24 in New Zealand.

=== Promotion ===
The music video for "Last Thing On My Mind" was directed by Phil Griffin. The video, which was filmed in Cuba, features Lee picking up all the band members in his convertible. When they sing the chorus, each member is singing a scene is similar to ABBA's "Mamma Mia". The final scenes of the video are set around a pool where the band perform the full dance routine.

=== Track listings ===
- UK CD1
1. "Last Thing on My Mind" (radio edit) – 3:04
2. "Last Thing on My Mind" (Wip't Up in the Disco mix) – 5:39
3. "A Love to Last" – 3:42
4. "Last Thing on My Mind" (instrumental) – 3:01
- UK CD2
1. "Last Thing On My Mind" (radio edit) – 3:04
2. "5,6,7,8" (radio edit) – 3:22
3. "A Love to Last" – 3:42
4. "Last Thing on My Mind" (instrumental) – 3:01
- UK cassette single
1. "Last Thing on My Mind" (radio edit) – 3:04
2. "A Love to Last" – 3:42
- European CD single
1. "Last Thing on My Mind" (radio edit) – 3:04
2. "Last Thing on My Mind" (instrumental) – 3:01
- Australian CD single
1. "Last Thing on My Mind" (radio edit) – 3:04
2. "Last Thing on My Mind" (Wip't Up in the Disco mix) – 5:39
3. "A Love to Last" – 3:42
4. "Last Thing on My Mind" (instrumental) – 3:01
5. "5,6,7,8" (radio edit) – 3:22

=== Credits and personnel ===
==== A-side: "Last Thing on My Mind" ====
Credits are adapted from the liner notes of Step One.

Recording

- Recorded at PWL Studios (London and Manchester, England)
- Mixed at PWL Studios (London and Manchester, England)
- Mastered at Transfermation (London, England)

Personnel

- Songwriting – Mike Stock, Pete Waterman, Sara Dallin, Keren Woodward
- Production – Mark Topham, Karl Twigg, Pete Waterman
- Mixing – Paul Waterman
- Engineering – Chris McDonnell
- Drums – Chris McDonnell
- Keyboards – Karl Twigg, Mark Topham

==== B-side: "A Love to Last" ====
Credits are adapted from the liner notes of "Last Thing on My Mind".

Recording

- Recorded at PWL Studios (London and Manchester, England)

Personnel

- Songwriting – Barry Upton, Steve Crosby
- Production – Dan Sanders, Pete Waterman
- Mixing – Paul Waterman

=== Charts ===
==== Weekly charts ====
Chart (1998)	Peak position
Australia (ARIA)	5
Belgium (Ultratop 50 Flanders)	1
Belgium (Ultratop 50 Wallonia)	16
Europe (European Hot 100 Singles)	15
France (SNEP)	30
Iceland (Íslenski Listinn Topp 40)	22
Ireland (IRMA)	11
Netherlands (Dutch Top 40)	11
Netherlands (Single Top 100)	13
New Zealand (Recorded Music NZ)	24
Scottish Singles Sales (Official Charts)	2
Sweden (Sverigetopplistan)	59
UK Singles (Official Charts)	6
UK Airplay (Music Week)	25
UK Indie (Official Charts)	2

==== Year-end charts ====
Chart (1998)	Position
Australia (ARIA)	18
Belgium (Ultratop 50 Flanders)	5
Netherlands (Dutch Top 40)	59
Netherlands (Single Top 100)	87
UK Singles (OCC)	44

=== Certifications ===
Region	Certification	Certified units/sales
Australia (ARIA)	Platinum	70,000^{^}
United Kingdom (BPI)	Gold	400,000^{‡}
^{‡} Sales+streaming figures based on certification alone.

== Notable cover versions ==
Sha-Na recorded a version of the song, peaking at number 38 on the Ultratop Flanders chart.
