= Heartbeat (Steps song) =

1998 single by Steps

Single by Steps

from the album Step One
- A-side: "Tragedy" (double A-side)
- Released: 9 November 1998
- Studio: PWL (London and Manchester, England)
- Genre: Pop
- Length: 4:24
- Label: Jive; Ebul
- Songwriter: Jackie James
- Producers: Andrew Frampton; Pete Waterman

Steps singles chronology
"One for Sorrow" (1998)	"Heartbeat" / "Tragedy" (1998)	"Better Best Forgotten" (1999)

Music video
- "Heartbeat" on YouTube

"Heartbeat" is a song by British pop group Steps, from their debut studio album Step One (1998). Issued as a double A-side with their cover of the 1979 Bee Gees single "Tragedy", it was released on 9 November 1998 as the fourth single off the album. "Heartbeat" was solely written by Jackie James. While promoting the 2012 Hit Factory Live event, Pete Waterman revealed that the song had sat in a drawer for years before he gave it to the band to record.

"Heartbeat" / "Tragedy" reached number one in the United Kingdom and New Zealand. In the UK, it did not reach number one until January 1999, nearly two months after its release, and it sold more copies than the three previous Steps singles combined, with 1.21 million copies sold in the UK. The music video for the song features the band trying to rescue member Ian "H" Watkins from the Ice Queen.

== Music video ==
The music video for "Heartbeat" was directed by David Amphlett and is set in snowy surroundings. It begins with Steps riding a sleigh while an evil Ice Queen has her sights set on Ian "H" Watkins; she is watching an image on the tiny pond in her throne room. The group are staying in a lodge, and H goes out back to fetch some wood for the fire. The Ice Queen decides that this is the time to strike, and she sends her three dwarf guards to kidnap H. They jump H, and the Ice Queen casts a spell, knocking him out. By the time H wakes up, he is in the back of their sleigh. The rest of the group come out and find H is missing, finding only a little sword carried by one of the guards. On skis and snowmobiles, they set off to rescue H. Along the way to the Ice Queen's castle, they stop at a barn, finding absolutely nothing. Arriving at the castle, they break into the throne room where H is tied up in the middle of the frozen pond. Faye Tozer, Lee Latchford-Evans and Claire Richards easily take care of the guards (while H is able to free himself), and Lisa Scott-Lee defeats the Ice Queen with a karate kick to the chin. The group then returns to the lodge for a Christmas party.

== Track listings ==
UK and Australian CD single

1. "Heartbeat" – 4:24
2. "Tragedy" – 4:31
3. "Heartbeat" (instrumental) – 4:24

UK cassette single and European CD single

1. "Heartbeat" – 4:24
2. "Tragedy" – 4:31

== Credits and personnel ==
Credits are adapted from the liner notes of Step One.

Recording

- Recorded at PWL Studios (London and Manchester, England)
- Mixed at PWL Studios (London and Manchester, England)
- Mastered at Transfermation (London, England)

Personnel

- Songwriting – Jackie James
- Production – Andrew Frampton, Pete Waterman
- Mixing – Paul Waterman, Dan Frampton
- Engineering – Dan Frampton
- Drums – Pete Waterman
- Guitar – Greg Bone
- All other instruments – Andrew Frampton

== Charts ==
=== Weekly charts ===
Chart (1998–1999)	Peak position
Australia (ARIA)	10
Belgium (Ultratop 50 Flanders)	8
Belgium (Ultratop 50 Wallonia)	27
Europe (Eurochart Hot 100)	6
Greece (IFPI)	10
Ireland (IRMA)	2
Netherlands (Dutch Top 40)	22
Netherlands (Single Top 100)	24
New Zealand (Recorded Music NZ)	1
Scotland Singles (OCC)	1
Sweden (Sverigetopplistan)	4
UK Singles (OCC)	1
UK Airplay (Music Week)	10
UK Indie (OCC)	1

=== Year-end charts ===
Chart (1998)	Position
Belgium (Ultratop 50 Flanders)	68
UK Singles (OCC)	12

Chart (1999)	Position
Australia (ARIA)	92
Europe (Eurochart Hot 100)	46
Netherlands (Dutch Top 40)	132
New Zealand (RIANZ)	48
Sweden (Hitlistan)	30
UK Singles (OCC)	19

== Certifications ==
Region	Certification	Certified units/sales
Belgium (BRMA)	Gold	25,000^{*}
New Zealand (RMNZ)	Platinum	10,000^{*}
Sweden (GLF)	Gold	15,000^{^}
United Kingdom (BPI)	2× Platinum	1,210,000
United States	—	98,000
^{*} Sales figures based on certification alone.^{^} Shipments figures based on certification alone.

== Release history ==
Region	Version	Date	Format(s)	Label(s)	Ref.
United Kingdom	"Heartbeat" / "Tragedy"	9 November 1998	CD; cassette	Jive; Ebul	

== See also ==
- List of UK Singles Chart number ones of the 1990s
- List of million-selling singles in the United Kingdom
