= Trust (Brother Beyond album) =

Studio album by Brother Beyond
- Released: 13 November 1989
- Recorded: "Townhouse" "Olympic Studios" / London (recording and mix); "Abbey Road Studios" (mastering)
- Genres: Pop rock, electronic, downtempo, synthpop
- Length: 41:10
- Label: EMI / Parlophone / Gong
- Producer: various (see Credits)

Brother Beyond chronology
| Get Even (1988) | Trust (1989) | The Very Best of Brother Beyond (2005) |

Trust is the second album of the British boy band / pop group Brother Beyond, released in 1989, by EMI / Parlophone (later re-released by Gong label). It was their last album, since they disbanded. After their two major hits, "The Harder I Try" and "He Ain't No Competition", written for them by famous producers Stock, Aitken and Waterman, the band, as lead singer Nathan Moore puts it on his Official Website, "made the classic mistake of thinking they did not need Stock Aitken and Waterman... We wrote the whole of the next album ourselves and (it) bombed totally". The three singles taken from the Trust album were only minor hits, getting no higher than the UK Top 40. The first, "Drive On", which was also the opening track of Side 2 on the vinyl edition, got to Number 39, in October 1989. The second, "When Will I See You Again?", a soulful ballad by The Three Degrees (written by popular composing duo Gamble & Huff), stopped at Number 43, in December 1989. The third and last, "Trust", the title-track and opener to the whole album, stalled at Number 53, in March 1990.

EMI America gave the band a push to conquer the USA market, and the American release of the album, which was released in mid-1990, dropped one song, "Universal", and added two new songs, which were released as singles: "The Girl I Used to Know" and "Just A Heartbeat Away" produced by American producers Carl Sturken and Evan Rogers. "The Girl I Used to Know" was released as the lead single off the album in the US and became a top 40 hit in the Billboard Hot 100, peaking at No. 27. It was released as a non-album single in Europe in early 1991, and peaked at No. 48 in the UK.

== Track listing ==
All tracks are written by Carl Fysh except where noted.

| No. | Title | Writer(s) | Length |
|---|---|---|---|
| 1. | "Trust" | Carl Fysh, David White | 3:58 |
| 2. | "You Never Tell Me" | Fysh, Jeff Lorber, White | 3:43 |
| 3. | "I Believe in You" | Fysh, White | 4:27 |
| 4. | "Now I'm Alone with You" | Fysh, White | 3:46 |
| 5. | "Let Me Decide" | Fysh, White | 4:21 |
| 6. | "Drive On" | Fysh, White | 4:05 |
| 7. | "Perfect Love" | Fysh, White | 3:50 |
| 8. | "When Will I See You Again" (The Three Degrees cover) | Kenneth Gamble, Leon Huff | 3:34 |
| 9. | "Universal" | Fysh, White | 3:33 |
| 10. | "Outside Our Lives" | Fysh, White | 5:53 |

U.S. track listing
| No. | Title | Writer(s) | Length |
|---|---|---|---|
| 1. | "The Girl I Used to Know" | Earl Rogers, Carl Sturken | 4:24 |
| 2. | "Drive On" | Fysh, White | 4:05 |
| 3. | "When Will I See You Again" (The Three Degrees cover) | Gamble, Huff | 3:34 |
| 4. | "Trust" | Fysh, White | 3:58 |
| 5. | "You Never Tell Me" | Fysh, Lorber, White | 3:43 |
| 6. | "Just A Heartbeat Away" | Rogers, Sturken | 5:39 |
| 7. | "Now I'm Alone with You" | Fysh, White | 3:36 |
| 8. | "I Believe in You" | Fysh, White | 4:27 |
| 9. | "Let Me Decide" | Fysh, White | 4:21 |
| 10. | "Perfect Love" | Fysh, Lorber, White | 3:50 |
| 11. | "Outside Our Lives" | Fysh, White | 5:53 |

== Charts ==
| Chart (1989) | Peak position |
|---|---|
| UK Albums (OCC) | 60 |

== Certifications ==
| Region | Certification | Certified units/sales |
|---|---|---|
| United Kingdom (BPI) | Gold | 100,000^{^} |
^{^} Shipments figures based on certification alone.

== Singles from the album ==
- "Drive On" (1989)
- "When Will I See You Again?" (1989)
- "Trust" (1990)
- "The Girl I Used to Know" (1990)
- "Just A Heartbeat Away" (1990)

== Personnel ==
- Nathan Moore – lead vocals
- David White – guitar
- Carl Fysh – keyboards
- Steve Alexander – drums, percussion

=== Musicians ===
- Dizzie Heights – rap track 5
- Beverley Skeete, Claudia Fontaine, Janice Hoyte, John Sloman, Leroy Osbourne – background vocals
- Phil Palmer – guitar
- Phil Todd – saxophone
- Guy Barker – trumpet, flugelhorn
- Andy Wright – keyboards
- Jeff Lorber, Steve Pigott – keyboards, programming

=== Production ===
- Brother Beyond – production tracks 5 & 10
- Jeff Lorber – production & arrangement tracks 1 to 4, 6 to 9
- Keith Cohen – production & engineering tracks 1 to 4, 6 & 9; mix tracks 1, 2, 6 & 9
- Nick Webb – mastering
- Hugo Nicolson – engineering tracks 7 & 8; additional engineering tracks 3 & 4
- Steve "Barney" Chase – additional engineering tracks 3 & 4
- Adam Moseley – engineering, production & mix tracks 5 & 10; additional engineering track 8
- Pete Schwier – mix tracks 3 & 8
- Bryan "Chuck" New – mix tracks 4 & 7

=== Staff ===
- Michael Roberts – photography
- The Leisure Process – design and art direction
- Simon Carter, Steve Margo for Management One – management
- Friends of Brother Beyond; London – fan club
- Gerry Barad for Brockum; London, New York City, Toronto, Sydney – merchandising
- Clive Black, Loraine Trent – special collaborators

== Release details ==
| Country | Date | Format | Label | Catalogue # |
|---|---|---|---|---|
| UK | 1989 | LP | EMI-Parlophone | HCDL 37373 |
| Hungary | | CD | Gong | 64 7934131 |
