= The Very Best of Brother Beyond =

Greatest hits album by Brother Beyond
- Released: May 23, 2005
- Recorded: 1986–1991
- Genre: Synthpop, pop rock, soul
- Label: EMI Gold
- Producer: various

Brother Beyond chronology
Trust (1989)	The Very Best of Brother Beyond (2005)

The Very Best of Brother Beyond is a compilation from British boy band / pop group Brother Beyond, released in 2005, by EMI label, for its «Gold Series», containing all the quartet's greatest hits, as well as minor successes, including their last single, that is the United States success called "The Girl I Used to Know" (never before included on any of their albums). The record also contains five very hard to find 12" versions: "The Harder I Try", "Drive On", "Be My Twin", "Can You Keep a Secret?" and "He Ain't No Competition". The compilation, totally featuring 17 tracks, came out 15 years after Brother Beyond's last single. Besides the above-mentioned five 12" versions, the collection also includes all 11 singles released by the group, between 1986 and 1991, plus 1 B-side (from 1986). The album contains their only 2 Top 10 hits ("The Harder I Try" and "He Ain't No Competition", both produced by British producing team Stock, Aitken & Waterman); 1 Top 20 ("Be My Twin"); 1 Top 30 (the '89 remix to "Can You Keep a Secret?"; the original version, which was here omitted, never got higher than the Top 60, instead); 1 Top 40 ("Drive On"); 2 Top 50 ("When Will I See You Again?" and "The Girl I Used to Know"); 2 Top 60 ("Chain-Gang Smile", and their second album's title-track, "Trust"); and 1 Top 75 ("How Many Times"). The greatest hits collection also includes the very first single from the band, "I Should Have Lied", the only one which never succeeded in entering the UK Top 75. As concerns the one B-side here proposed, this is the original version to the popular track called "Act for Love", previously contained, in its extended version only, in both CD editions of their first album, Get Even.

== Track listing ==
All tracks are written by Carl Fysh except where noted

No.	Title	Writer(s)	Length
1.	"The Harder I Try"		3:31
2.	"He Ain't No Competition"		3:22
3.	"Be My Twin"		3:42
4.	"Can You Keep A Secret?"		3:27
5.	"How Many Times"	Carl Fysh, David White	3:16
6.	"Chain-Gang Smile"		3:46
7.	"Drive On" (7" version)	Fysh, White	4:06
8.	"When Will I See You Again" (The Three Degrees cover)	Kenneth Gamble, Leon Huff	3:37
9.	"Trust"	Fysh, White	3:15
10.	"The Girl I Used to Know"	Earl Rogers, Carl Sturken	4:14
11.	"I Should Have Lied"		3:48
12.	"Act for Love"		6:18
13.	"The Harder I Try" (12" version)		6:09
14.	"Drive On" (Apple mix)	Fysh, White	6:08
15.	"Be My Twin" (12" version)		6:09
16.	"Can You Keep A Secret?" ('89 extended mix)		7:10
17.	"He Ain't No Competition" (12" version)		5:42

== Personnel ==
- Nathan Moore: vocals
- David White: guitars
- Carl Fysh: keyboards
- Eg White / Steve Alexander: drums

== References and external links ==
- Paul Gambaccini, Tim Rice, Jonathan Rice (1993), British Hit Singles, Guinness Publishing Ltd., ISBN 0-85112-526-3.
- EveryHit.com: UK Top 40 Database.
- Amazon.com: editorial and customer reviews, sleeve, product details, track listing, and audio samples of all 17 tracks from The Very Best of Brother Beyond.
- Discogs: sleeve, product details, and track listing of The Very Best of Brother Beyond.
- Nathan Moore Official: Nathan Moore's official website, including a detailed biography and discography of Brother Beyond.
