= Lately (Lisa Scott-Lee song) =

2003 single by Lisa Scott-Lee

Single by Lisa Scott-Lee

from the album Never or Now
- B-side: "I'm Burning"
- Released: 12 May 2003
- Genre: Electropop
- Length: 3:40
- Label: Fontana
- Songwriters: Lisa Scott-Lee; Paul Newton; Daniel Sherman; Phillip Dyson; Peter Day
- Producer: Point4

Lisa Scott-Lee singles chronology
"Lately" (2003)	"Too Far Gone" (2003)

"Lately" is a song by Welsh singer-songwriter Lisa Scott-Lee. It was released as her debut solo single after the split of pop group Steps, of which Scott-Lee was a member. It was released on 12 May 2003 by Fontana Records and was written by Scott-Lee and Point4. The single peaked at number six on the UK Singles Chart, reached number 24 on the Irish Singles Chart, and also charted in the Netherlands and Switzerland. It is Scott-Lee's only single to reach the top 10 in the United Kingdom.

== Background and composition ==
Promoting the single Lisa Scott-Lee in an interview with Toazted stated, "Lately was one of the first songs I wrote after Steps when I wanted to go solo and I was very determined to get a record deal so I wanted to write, you know a really good song so that I could go round to different record companies and it was a very exciting time for me because my thinking of solo made me feel very nervous but I was excited and I.. you know when you get butterflies in your stomach? So I took that feeling and put it into a song. Lately is about when you meet somebody for the first time whether it's a boy or a girl and maybe you fancy each other and you get butterflies in your stomach and that's what Lately is about".

== Release and promotion ==
After Scott-Lee managed the band 3SL, consisting of her three brothers including Andy Scott-Lee who enjoyed very limited success, she collaborated with Point4, (Peter Day, Phil Dyson, Paul (Bronze) Newton, and Daniel Sherman) to write and produce eight songs together including "Lately", "Too Far Gone" and "I'll Wait for You", which was included on her debut album Never or Now. After Scott-Lee signed a record deal with Fontana Records, "Lately" was chosen to be released 12 May 2003.

Scott-Lee performed the track on two appearances on Top of the Pops, notably singing the song live on both occasions. She also performed the song on CD:UK. When Steps re-formed in 2011 and announced they would go on tour during Spring in 2012, Lisa performed a medley as her solo featuring Heaven, Beautiful People and Lately.

== Chart performance ==
"Lately" debuted at number six in the United Kingdom on 24 May 2003, but it quickly fell out of the top ten, appearing at number 14. It spent two weeks in the top 20 and five weeks in the top 40 before leaving the top 100.

== Music video ==
The music video for "Lately" begins with some dark shots of Scott-Lee's body under a red shade of light with neon lights behind her as she looks into the camera whilst wearing a ribboned white outfit. She plays up to computer generated camera's which gets close ups of her dancing that is shown on a TV screen in front on a couple lusting on a couch and a couple in a car. There are shots of her in a revealing brown outfit (that she wears for the single art) with flashing lights behind her as she sings into a glowing hanging microphone. After the first chorus the males get distracted by Scott-Lee on the TV screens as she is getting their attention away from the girls they are with. After the second chorus she is in a different outfit that is black with silver chains around her waist with flashing lights behind her singing the bridge of the song. The video does not have a set dance routine or any dancers although Scott-Lee dances up to the cameras through the video and it is very different from anything that she has done in Steps.

== Track listings ==
UK CD single

1. "Lately" (radio edit)
2. "Lately" (Stella Browne remix)
3. "Lately" (Soda Club radio edit)
4. "Lately" (56k mix)
5. "Lately" (video)

UK cassette single

1. "Lately" (radio edit)
2. "Lately" (Stella Browne remix)
3. "Lately" (Soda Club radio edit)
4. "Lately" (56k mix)

European CD single

1. "Lately" (radio edit)
2. "Lately" (Stella Browne remix radio edit)
3. "Lately" (video)

Australian CD single

1. "Lately" (radio edit)
2. "Lately" (Stella Browne remix)
3. "Lately" (Soda Club radio edit)
4. "I'm Burning"
5. "Lately" (video)

== Charts ==
=== Weekly charts ===
Weekly chart performance for "Lately"
Chart (2003)	Peak position
Ireland (IRMA)	24
Netherlands (Dutch Top 40)	35
Netherlands (Single Top 100)	46
Scottish Singles Sales (Official Charts)	8
Switzerland (Schweizer Hitparade)	52
UK Singles (Official Charts)	6

=== Year-end charts ===
Year-end chart performance for "Lately"
Chart (2003)	Position
UK Singles (OCC)	161

== Release history ==
Release history and formats for "Lately"
Region	Date	Format(s)	Label(s)	Ref.
United Kingdom	12 May 2003	12-inch vinyl; CD; cassette	Fontana	
Australia	30 June 2003	CD	Fontana	
