= Totally Scott-Lee =

British reality television series

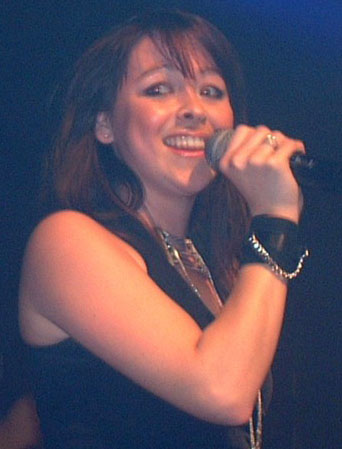
Lisa Scott-Lee, 2004

Totally Scott-Lee is a 2005 reality television show on MTV UK featuring Lisa Scott-Lee of the group Steps, Andy Scott-Lee from Pop Idol and the group 3SL, Michelle Heaton of Liberty X, Nathan Moore (formerly of Brother Beyond and Worlds Apart), and publicist Sean Borg.

== Production ==
Totally Scott-Lee follows Lisa on her last-ditch effort at a solo career.

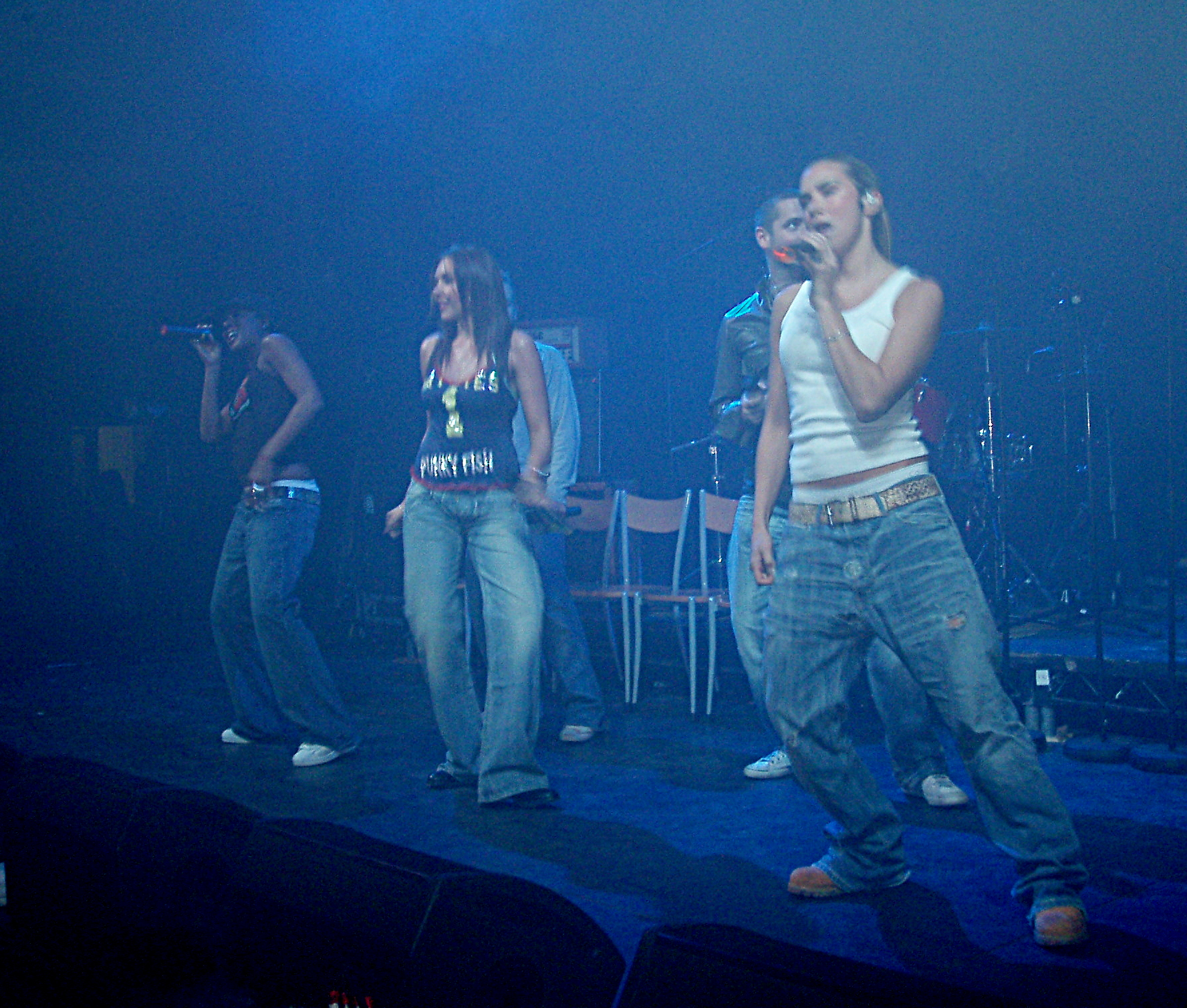
Michelle Heaton, centre, 2005

In the summer of 2005, it was revealed that a camera crew from MTV UK had been following Scott-Lee for nearly a year, tracking her life and those of her husband (Johnny Shentall of Hear'Say), her brother (Andy Scott-Lee), former publicist Sean Borg, '80s pop singer turned music manager Nathan Moore, and her brother's girlfriend Michelle Heaton (of Liberty X). The show was to be the UK version of MTV's US hit Newlyweds: Nick and Jessica.

The show, titled Totally Scott-Lee (originally Scott-Lee Unlimited) follows a year in Scott-Lee's life and her efforts to put her solo career back on track. In the show, Scott-Lee stated that she wanted to score a top ten hit with her next single or she would quit the music industry.

Lisa and the other cast members had no creative control of the series and Lisa Scott-Lee was unhappy with some of the promotional material, notably the subtitle "desperately seeking fame".

Lisa was signed to a small record label, Concept Records, and began recording songs for her next single. Concept chose "Electric", written by Guy Chambers, and started making plans for its release. The single had to be released on Monday 10 October 2005 in order to meet with deadlines for the show, with the chart position to be revealed live to Lisa on MTV the following Sunday.

The-then female head of Concept Records, Roseann McBride, has since gone on record (on the show and in private) several times saying that she was against the record being released on this date. One of the main reasons for this was that it would have very little promotion time (5 weeks as opposed to the usual 8–10 weeks).

"Electric" was released on 10 October 2005 and entered the UK top 40 on 16 October 2005 at number 13.

== Episode synopses ==
Episode 1 (originally aired September 4, 2005) Filmed in early October 2004, Lisa promotes her latest single Get It On, a collaboration with Intenso Project. Michelle pressures Andy to propose to her whilst manager Nathan tries to find out if the rumors about their impending marriage are true. Lisa works hard to promote Get It On with a series of club dates and performances but ultimately the single charts at number 23 and she is extremely upset and disappointed.

Episode 2 (originally aired September 11, 2005) Lisa is still extremely disappointed about her lack of chart success; she discusses her situation with her family and takes a promotional job helping to open a branch of the jewellers H.Samuels. Andy signs his solo record deal with Concept Records to the delight of manager Max Bloom, publicist Roseann McBride and manager Nathan. Lisa and Johnny celebrate their wedding anniversary but she becomes upset when he has to leave for a UK tour of Starlight Express. Nathan contacts Lisa after seeing newspaper reports that suggest her husband is having an affair. Andy visits the home of Michelle's parents and asks for their permission to propose to her.

Episode 3 (originally aired September 18, 2005) Lisa signs her agreement with MTV- she has five weeks to record, release and promote a single that will make (at least) the top 10 in the UK Singles Charts otherwise she will give up her recording career. Andy and Michelle go on holiday to Marbella and read the latest press about their relationship in OK Magazine. Lisa records some new material but faces a stark reality when Nathan presents her with a list of record companies that have rejected her. Publicist Sean Borg suggests additional methods of self-promotion including a sexy photo shoot but Lisa isn't happy. Andy formally proposes to Michelle at a restaurant in Marbella.

Episode 4 (originally aired September 25, 2005) Andy contacts Lisa to inform her of his engagement to Michelle- Lisa gets upset that Andy didn't let the family know before the press and the pair argue over the phone. Nathan is turned down by every record label he approaches with the exception of Concept Records which, coincidentally, is also the same label that Andy has just signed with. Lisa and her friends attend Michelle's birthday party but accidentally leave her present in the taxi. Concept Label boss Max and publicist Roseann listen to Lisa's new material- dance hit Electric and rock ballad Never or Now. Max lets Nathan know that the label want to release Electric but both Lisa and Nathan aren't convinced it is the right choice.

Episode 5 (originally aired October 2, 2005) Lisa and Andy meet in a cafe to discuss his engagement to Michelle; Lisa still isn't happy about how Andy went about it, but accepts his explanation and the pair reconcile. Johnny has returned home and discusses the possibility of extending his touring contract with Starlight Express. Lisa completes the recording of her single whilst Andy promotes his single at various live events. Lisa and Nathan meet with Max and Roseann to discuss the budget for her Electric music video. The Scott-Lee family celebrate Lisa and Andy's fathers birthday before they both go to shoot their respective music videos. Nathan floats the idea to Andy that he releases his single the same day as Lisa to increase publicity- Andy immediately rejects the idea.

Episode 6 (originally aired October 9, 2005) Nathan tells Roseann that Andy is not happy about the singles being released on the same day- Roseann agrees that his single needs to be pushed back to avoid the competition. Lisa and Johnny visit Lisa's Grandmother and show her the Electric video. Lisa continues to promote her single and the show but the tabloids print another rumor that Johnny is having an affair with a member of the Starlight Express cast. To counteract the negative publicity, Lisa and Johnny attend the premiere of the film Goal! together. Michelle receives news that Liberty X's latest single Song 4 Lovers has a mid-week prediction of number four in the singles charts- band mate Jessica Taylor visits and celebrates with Michelle and Andy. Max and Roseann discuss the single sales of Electric- both are skeptical that it will make the Top 10.

Episode 7 (originally aired October 16, 2005) Lisa promotes her single on shows like CD:UK and on various radio programs and live festivals. Nathan meets with his father to discuss the stress of managing pop stars. The Electric single is finally released in the shops and Lisa encourages all her friends and family to buy it. The Scott-Lee family celebrate the single's release at home but the fireworks are interrupted by an angry neighbor. Roseann receives news that the midweek prediction of Electric is 26 but later finds out that Woolworth's haven't been registering the sales correctly and the correct prediction is actually 15. Lisa is upset to hear the news but continues to promote the single. Roseann expresses her concerns to Max and Nathan that the limited period of publicity may have affected sales more than they initially thought.

On original broadcast, this episode ended with Lisa and her family then receiving live on air the news that Electric entered the charts at number 13, coinciding with the Radio 1 Sunday Chart Show.

Episode 8 (originally aired October 23, 2005) Lisa continues to promote the single around the UK; her family, manager and husband Johnny provide moral support. Nathan discusses Lisa's progress with her mother who is not impressed at his management of her daughter. Whilst preparing for the reveal live on MTV, Lisa inadvertently finds out that the single is not top 10- an argument ensues with the show's producers about her waiting on screen whilst the rest of the top 10 is read out. The single does not go Top 10; the following day, Lisa meets with Max and Nathan to discuss the idea of her promoting the single in other parts of the world where the reaction has been more favorable. The series ends with Lisa and Johnny in a restaurant deciding what to do next.
