= Intenso Project =

- Genres: Electronic, house
- Label: Big Star
- Spinoff of: Phats & Small; Double Trouble
- Members: Ben Ofoedu; DJ Rods; Leigh Guest

Intenso Project are an English electronic music group consisting of vocalist Ben Ofoedu, DJ Rods, and Leigh Guest (from Double Trouble). On the UK Singles Chart, the band has had hits such as, "Luv Da Sunshine", "Your Music" featuring Laura Jaye, and "Get It On" featuring Lisa Scott-Lee, each reaching the No. 22, No. 32, and No. 23 spots, respectively.

== Background ==
The band formed after Ben Ofoedu left Phats & Small and formed a band with DJ Rods (aka Rodney Williams), whom he had known since school, and Leigh Guest, a member of Double Trouble.

Their first single was "Luv Da Sunshine". It charted at No. 22 on the UK Singles Chart, spending two weeks there.

Their third single, "Get It On", featured Lisa Scott-Lee and was promoted with a music video that was self-funded by Intenso and Scott-Lee, and charted at No. 23 on the UK Singles Chart, spending three weeks on the chart, despite being B-listed at Capital. The relative failure of this record (Scott-Lee had been dropped after producing a record that had charted at No. 11 on the UK Singles Chart) resulted in her taking a break from music, and the record not being featured on her solo album, Never or Now. It was also performed on Top of the Pops.

In addition, Intenso Project have provided a remix for Aaliyah's "Don't Know What to Tell Ya".

== Discography ==
=== Singles ===
List of singles, with selected chart positions
Title	Year	Peak chart positions	
Title	Year	UK	AUS
"Luv Da Sunshine"	2002	22	—
"Your Music" (featuring Laura Jaye)	2003	22	—
"Get It On" (featuring Lisa Scott Lee)	2004	23	56
"Don't Go" (featuring LTD)	2020	—	—
