= Naomi Awards =

British satirical music award ceremony

Naomi Awards was an award ceremony dedicated to the year's worst music acts. It was a parody of the BRIT Awards, and was run by the music channel Music Choice. They were named after supermodel Naomi Campbell, whose own 1994 single "Love and Tears" was seen by Music Choice as a supremely awful example of the genre. They were voted for by selected music industry figures.

== 2005 winners ==
- Worst British Group - Blue
- Worst British Male - Jamie Cullum
- Worst British Female - Rachel Stevens
- Worst British Single - "I Believe My Heart" by Duncan James and Keedie Babb
- Worst British Album - The Meaning of Love by Michelle McManus
- Worst International Male - Brian McFadden
- Worst International Female - Nadia Almada
- Worst International Group - Westlife
- Worst International Album - The Long Road Back by Peter Andre
- Worst International Breakthrough - DJ Casper
- Worst British Breakthrough Act - McFly
- Worst British Attempt at Rock - Busted
- Worst Pop Act - Sam & Mark
- Worst Live Act - Pete Doherty
- Least Convincing 'Urban' Act - Blazin' Squad
- Outstandingly Bad Contribution to Music - Louis Walsh

== 2006 winners ==
- Worst British Male Solo Artist - Lee Ryan
- Worst British Female Solo Artist - Lisa Scott-Lee
- Worst British Album - Heart and Soul by Steve Brookstein
- Worst British Single - "Electric" by Lisa Scott-Lee
- Worst Attempt at Rock - Son of Dork
- Worst Urban Act - Ms. Dynamite
- Worst Live Act - Babyshambles
- Worst Pop Act - Lisa Scott-Lee
- Worst International Male Solo Artist - Jack Johnson
- Worst International Female Solo Artist - Jessica Simpson
- Worst International Album - Face to Face by Westlife
- Worst International Group - Westlife
- Worst International Breakthrough Artist - The Pussycat Dolls
- Outstandingly Bad Contribution to Music - Westlife

== See also ==
- Golden Raspberry Awards
