= Brother Beyond =

1980s British pop band

- Genres: Pop
- Years active: 1985–1991
- Label: Parlophone
- Past members: Nathan Moore; David Ben White; Carl Fysh; Steve Alexander; Eg White

Brother Beyond were a British pop band in the late 1980s.

== Biography ==
=== Early singles and first album ===
The group's first four singles, "I Should Have Lied", "How Many Times", "Chain-Gang Smile" (produced by Don Was), and an early version of "Can You Keep a Secret?", were written by band members Eg White and David Ben White in collaboration with Carl Fysh. The songs were performed by the band members, led by vocalist Nathan Moore. These early singles, released between 1986 and 1988, were minor successes in the UK Singles Chart.

When the songwriters and producers Mike Stock, Matt Aitken and Pete Waterman, known as Stock Aitken Waterman (SAW), auctioned their services for charity, Brother Beyond and label EMI won the auction. The first song to be released from this session was "The Harder I Try", a UK No. 2 hit. The song was succeeded by the song "He Ain't No Competition", reaching No. 6 in the UK. The following releases from the Get Even album failed to make the UK Top Ten. All of these singles were taken from the two editions of their first album Get Even.

=== Second album ===
After a brief hiatus, they returned with a new single in late 1989, "Drive On", which peaked at No. 39 in the UK, from their second album Trust. They then released a cover of the ballad by The Three Degrees, "When Will I See You Again?", which peaked outside the UK top 40 at No. 43. The final release from their second album was the title track, "Trust", self-written, but this only peaked at No. 53 in the UK.

EMI America issued the album Trust in the USA mid-1990 adding two new songs which the group recorded in the USA and with a more American sound to break the US market. Both were released as singles there, with the lead single "The Girl I Used to Know" achieving success, peaking at No. 27 on the Billboard Hot 100. Nathan Moore has alleged the band were required to pay £100,000 to the mafia as part of a payola strategy to secure US airplay for the single.

The follow-up single was "Just a Heartbeat Away", released commercially in Australia and as a promotional single in the US, which failed to chart. "The Girl I Used to Know" was released as a non-album single in Europe in early 1991 and peaked at No. 48 in the UK. The group disbanded that same year, with Moore joining another boyband, Worlds Apart.

In January 2011, an expanded edition of Get Even was released, featuring the original line up of the album, along with four bonus tracks. The bonus tracks are extended versions or remixes of "I Should Have Lied", "The Harder I Try", "He Ain't No Competition" and "Be My Twin".

== Members ==
- Nathan Moore (vocals) – born Nathan Marcellus Moore, 10 January 1965, Stamford Hill, London
- David White (guitar) - born David Benjamin White, 6 June 1965, Highbury, London
- Carl Fysh (keyboards) - born Carl Anthony Fysh, 25 January 1963, Oxford, Oxfordshire
- Steve Alexander (drums) – born Steven Alexander, 20 November 1962, Ystradgynlais, Powys
- Eg White (bass) – born Francis Anthony White, 22 November 1966

== Discography ==
=== Albums ===
- Get Even (1988) – UK No. 9, AUS No. 89, GER No. 63
- Trust (1989) – UK No. 60
- The Very Best of Brother Beyond (compilation, 2005)

=== Singles ===
Year	Single	Peak positions										Album
Year	Single	UK	AUS	BEL (FLA)	GER	IRE	NED	NZ	SWI	US	US Dance	Album
1986	"I Should Have Lied"	166	—	—	—	—	—	—	—	—	—	Get Even
1987	"How Many Times"	62	—	—	—	—	—	—	—	—	—	Get Even
1987	"Chain-Gang Smile"	57	—	—	—	—	—	—	—	—	—	Get Even
1988	"Can You Keep a Secret?"	56	—	—	—	—	—	—	—	—	—	Get Even
1988	"The Harder I Try"	2	78	20	32	1	20	15	13	—	—	Get Even
1988	"He Ain't No Competition"	6	53	32	39	4	—	19	—	—	—	Get Even
1989	"Be My Twin"	14	—	—	53	13	—	—	—	—	10	Get Even
1989	"Can You Keep a Secret? (1989 Mix)"	22	157	—	—	18	—	31	—	—	—	Get Even
1989	"Drive On"	39	—	—	—	—	74	—	—	—	—	Trust
1989	"When Will I See You Again"	43	—	—	—	—	—	—	—	—	—	Trust
1990	"Trust"	53	—	—	—	—	—	—	—	—	—	Trust
1990	"The Girl I Used to Know"	48	—	—	—	—	—	—	—	27	—	Trust
1990	"Just A Heartbeat Away"	—	—	—	—	—	—	—	—	—	—	Trust
"—" denotes releases that did not chart or were not released.

== After the split ==
Lead singer Nathan Moore went on to sing with another boy band called Worlds Apart, successful in France in the mid-90s, and worked as a manager to such acts as Jessica Garlick. He was also a contestant on ITV's Hit Me Baby One More Time, and part of Lisa Scott-Lee's Totally Scott-Lee programme set up on MTV.

Drummer Steve Alexander toured with Duran Duran for six years before going solo. He has since worked with Jeff Beck and formed a musical collaboration called Flashman with vocalist Renn. His new project is a collaboration with bassist Simon Little called Little Alex.

=== Eg and Alice ===
After leaving Brother Beyond, Eg White formed the duo Eg and Alice with artist Alice Temple. Their production was critically acclaimed but a commercial failure, and none of their singles ever entered the UK Top 75. They released one album (which also didn't chart) for WEA in 1991, before Eg decided to go solo, covering the Jellyfish hit "Stay Home". Eg White won an Ivor Novello award for writing Will Young's "Leave Right Now", and has written songs for a variety of artists including Natalie Imbruglia, Joss Stone and Adele.

==== Eg and Alice discography ====
Album

- 24 Years of Hunger (1991)

Singles

- "Indian" (1991)
- "Doesn't Mean That Much to Me" (1991)
