= Point4 =

- Also known as: 56K/Stylus
- Origin: United Kingdom
- Label: BMG/Edel Records/WEA/London Records
- Members: Pete Day; Paul Newton
- Past members: Phil Dyson; Daniel Sherman

Point4 was a quartet formed in 2001 and composed of Pete Day, Phil Dyson, Paul (Bronze) Newton, and Daniel Sherman. Paul and Daniel were introduced by their accountant as prolific songwriters and the team’s first collaboration was ‘The First Time’ which they signed to BMG Records.

Under the Point4 banner they remixed tracks for such acts as Lemar and Atomic Kitten, going on to write and produce 8 tracks for Lisa Scott-Lee including the songs Lately and Too Far Gone, which made #6 and #11 on the UK Singles Chart respectively.

Phil Dyson and Daniel Sherman left in 2004.
