= Get It On (Intenso Project song) =

2004 single by Intenso Project

Single by Intenso Project featuring Lisa Scott-Lee
- Released: 2004
- Length: 3:33
- Label: Big Star
- Songwriters: Leigh Guest; Ben Ofoedu; Lisa Scott-Lee; Andrew Whitmore; Rodney Williams
- Producer: Intenso Project

Intenso Project singles chronology
"Your Music" (2003)	"Get It On" (2004)

Lisa Scott-Lee singles chronology
"Too Far Gone" (2003)	"Get It On" (2004)	"Electric" (2005)

Alternative cover
- US single cover

"Get It On" is a single released by Intenso Project and the former Steps member Lisa Scott-Lee in 2004. It peaked at number 23 on the UK Singles Chart and number 38 in France.

== Track listings ==
UK CD

1. "Get It On" (radio edit) – 2:49
2. "Get It On" (original club mix) – 6:47
3. "Get It On" (DJ Bomba & Paolo remix) – 8:11
4. "Get It On" (video)

UK 12-inch single

A. "Get It On" (original club mix) – 6:47
B. "Get It On" (DJ Bomba & Paolo remix) – 8:11

French CD single

1. "Get It On" (radio edit) – 3:07
2. "Get It On" (original club mix) – 6:47

US CD single

1. "Get It On" (radio edit) – 3:07
2. "Get It On" (original club mix) – 6:47
3. "Get It On" (Mark Jason remix) – 6:15
4. "Get It On" (DJ Bomba & Paolo remix) – 8:11
5. "Get It On" (instrumental) – 3:29

US 12-inch single

A1. "Get It On" (original club mix) – 6:46
A2. "Get It On" (DJ Bomba & Paolo remix) – 8:10
B1. "Get It On" (Mark Jason remix) – 6:15
B2. "Get It On" (radio edit) – 3:07

Australian CD single

1. "Get It On" (radio edit) – 3:33
2. "Get It On" (original club mix) – 6:47
3. "Get It On" (DJ Bomba & Paolo remix) – 8:11
4. "Get It On" (Mark Jason remix) – 6:15
5. "Get It On" (video)

== Charts ==
Chart (2004–2005)	Peak position
Australia (ARIA)	56
France (SNEP)	38
Romania (Romanian Top 100)	69
Scotland Singles (Official Charts)	26
UK Singles (Official Charts)	23
UK Dance (Official Charts)	27
US Dance Radio Airplay (Billboard)	15
