= Too Far Gone (song) =

2003 single by Lisa Scott-Lee

Single by Lisa Scott-Lee

from the album Never or Now
- B-side: "That's That"
- Released: 8 September 2003
- Length: 3:38
- Label: Fontana
- Songwriters: Lisa Scott-Lee; Paul Newton; Daniel Sherman; Phillip Dyson; Peter Day
- Producer: Point4

Lisa Scott-Lee singles chronology
"Lately" (2003)	"Too Far Gone" (2003)	"Get It On" (2004)

Alternative cover
- UK CD2 cover

"Too Far Gone" is a song by Welsh singer-songwriter Lisa Scott-Lee. It was released on 8 September 2003 by Fontana Records as her second single release. It was written by Scott-Lee, Paul Newton, Daniel Sherman, Phillip Dyson and Peter Day, who also produced it. "Too Far Gone" debuted and peaked at number 11 on the UK Singles Chart.

== Music video ==
The video for "Too Far Gone" features Scott-Lee performing in front of blue, pink and red backdrops with her coloured dancers.

== Track listings ==
UK CD1

1. "Too Far Gone"
2. "Too Far Gone" (Illicit Pop mix)
3. "That's That"
4. "Too Far Gone" (video)

UK CD2 and European CD single

1. "Too Far Gone"
2. "Too Far Gone" (Almighty mix)
3. "Too Far Gone" (Bimbo Jones mix)

== Charts ==
Weekly chart performance for "Too Far Gone"
Chart (2003)	Peak position
Ireland (IRMA)	41
Scottish Singles Sales (Official Charts)	11
UK Singles (Official Charts)	11
