= Fornara =

Fornara is a surname. Notable people with the surname include:

- Carlo Fornara (1871–1968), Italian painter
- Pasquale Fornara (1925–1990), Italian cyclist
- Serge Fornara (born 1955), French rower
- Tim Fornara (born 1977), British television producer and director
