= Big Star (disambiguation) =

Big Star is an American rock band.

Big Star may also refer to:

- Big Star (South Korean band), a South Korean band
- Big Star Markets, a defunct American grocery store chain
- Big Star (horse), a horse that Nick Skelton rode to gold medals in the 2012 and 2016 Summer Olympics
- Big Star Records, a retail music chain that was based in Adelaide, South Australia
- Big Star, a song from Ocean Colour Scene's third album, Marchin' Already
- "Big Star" (Kenny Chesney song), a 2003 single by Kenny Chesney
- Big Star, a 2000 single by Adam Gregory off of his debut album The Way I'm Made
- Big Star, a song from Lorde’s 2021 album Solar Power
