= Drive On =

Drive On may refer to:

- "Drive On" (song), a 1989 song by Brother Beyond
- Drive On (album), a 1975 album by Mott
- "Drive On", a song by Johnny Cash from American Recordings
- Drive On!: A Social History of the Motor Car, a book by automotive journalist L. J. K. Setright
