= Get Even =

Studio album by Brother Beyond
- Released: 14 November 1988
- Recorded: 1986–1988
- Genres: Electronic; downtempo; pop rock; synthpop
- Length: 49:32 ("Get Even I" CD); 39:14 ("Get Even I" LP); 47:13 ("Get Even II" CD); 37:09 ("Get Even II" LP)
- Label: EMI / Parlophone
- Producer: various (see Credits)

Brother Beyond chronology
Get Even (1988)	Trust (1989)

Get Even is the debut album by British boy band Brother Beyond, released on the EMI/Parlophone label in two different editions, both in 1988, generally referred to as Get Even I and Get Even II. The second edition of the album included two songs by Stock Aitken Waterman, "The Harder I Try" and "He Ain't No Competition", which replaced two songs written by the band.

== Background ==
The album's songs were composed between 1986, when Brother Beyond's first single "I Should Have Lied"—the only single by the band not to make the UK Top 75—was issued, and 1988. The two Stock Aitken Waterman tracks, "The Harder I Try" and "He Ain't No Competition", were added to the album after EMI won the production team's services at a charity auction and became the band's only UK Top 10 hits.

Like many British bands at the time (such as Patsy Kensit's Eighth Wonder during their earlier period), Brother Beyond enjoyed more success in continental Europe than at home, especially in Italy where their second single "How Many Times" (which only made it to Number 62 in the UK) was a big hit in 1987. In their native Great Britain it would take until the summer of the following year and the release of the Mike Stock, Matt Aitken and Pete Waterman produced track "The Harder I Try" for the band to score a hit. The song reached number 2 in the UK Singles Chart. "The Harder I Try" samples the drum intro from The Isley Brothers' "This Old Heart of Mine"; its successor "He Ain't No Competition" reached number 6 in November 1988. The 12" version of the song had already topped the Hi-NRG charts in October.

Brother Beyond's final significant hits were two remixed versions of self-penned Get Even II album tracks "Be My Twin", which reached number 14 in January 1989, and "Can You Keep a Secret?", which reached number 22 in April (the first version of the song had been released as the band's fourth single, reaching number 56 in 1987). The latter would be the last significantly successful single for the group in the UK ("Drive On", the first single from their second and final studio album Trust, would only reach number 39, and the title track "Trust" number 53).

Get Even also spawned a 57-minute live concert video, entitled Brother Beyond – The Get Even Tour – Live 1989, issued on the VHS format in 1991, the same year of release as the band's final single, "The Girl I Used to Know", which found little success in the UK (number 48), but was a minor hit in the United States. The group broke up shortly after its release.

== Track listing ==
All tracks are written by Carl Fysh except where noted.

No.	Title	Writer(s)	Length
1.	"Be My Twin"		3:19
2.	"Chain-Gang Smile"		3:40
3.	"How Many Times"	Carl Fysh, David White	3:09
4.	"Restless"		4:25
5.	"Somebody Somewhere"		4:36
6.	"I Should Have Lied"		3:44
7.	"Can You Keep a Secret?"		3:24
8.	"Shipwrecked"		4:24
9.	"Sunset Bars"		4:20
10.	"King of Blue"		4:13
11.	"Act for Love" (extended version)		6:09
12.	"Sometimes Good Sometimes Bad (Sometimes Better)"		3:55

Get Even II
No.	Title	Writer(s)	Length
1.	"He Ain't No Competition"	Stock Aitken Waterman	3:19
2.	"Can You Keep a Secret?"		3:24
3.	"Chain-Gang Smile"		3:40
4.	"Restless"		4:25
5.	"How Many Times"	Fysh, Eg White	3:09
6.	"Be My Twin"	Fysh, D. White	3:27
7.	"The Harder I Try"	Stock Aitken Waterman	3:24
8.	"I Should Have Lied"		3:44
9.	"Shipwrecked"		4:24
10.	"King of Blue"		4:13
11.	"Act for Love" (extended version)		6:09
12.	"Sometimes Good Sometimes Bad (Sometimes Better)"		3:55

== Personnel ==
=== Get Even I ===
==== Line up ====
- Nathan Moore – lead vocals
- David White – guitar
- Carl Fysh – keyboards
- Eg White – drums / percussion

==== Musicians ====
- Steve Alexander – drums, percussion
- Belva Haney, Dee Lewis, Eric Robinson, Flakey C, Frankie Madrid, Leroy Osbourne, Mae McKenna, Vicki St. James, Tessa Niles – background vocals
- Eg White – bass guitar, keyboards
- Dave Mattacks, Steve Ferrone – drums
- Peter-John Vettese, Richard Cottle, Rob Fisher, Ian Curnow, Steve Pigott – keyboards
- Luís Jardim – percussion
- Martin Ditcham – drums, percussion
- Bimbo Acock, Phil Todd – saxophone

==== Production ====
Same as Get Even II, plus:

- Brother Beyond – production (tracks 5, 9)
- Michael H. Brauer per MHB Productions – remix and additional production
- Mike Pela per Power Plant London – sound engineer
- Carl Beatty – sound engineer (track 9)
- Rafe McKenna – remix and additional production (track 9)

==== Recording studios ====
- Abbey Road Studios
- Advision Studios
- Battery Studios
- The Chocolate Factory
- Eden Studios
- Mayfair Studios
- The Music Works
- Power Plant Studios
- PWL Studios
- Rockfield Studios
- Swanyard Studios
- Trident II Studios

==== Staff ====
- Three Associates – design
- Sheila Rock – photography
- Simon Carter for Management One – management

=== Get Even II ===
==== Line up ====
- Nathan Moore – lead vocals
- David White – guitar
- Carl Fysh – keyboards
- Steve Alexander – drums / percussion

==== Musicians ====
- Eg White – drums, percussion
- Belva Haney, Dee Lewis, Eric Robinson, Flakey C, Frankie Madrid, Leroy Osbourne, Mae McKenna, Vicki St James – background vocals
- Dave Mattacks, Steve Ferrone – drums
- Peter Vetesse, Richard Cottle, Rob Fisher – keyboards
- Ian Curnow – keyboards
- Steve Pigott – keyboards
- Luis Jardim – percussion
- Martin Ditcham – drums, percussion
- Bimbo Acock, Phil Todd – saxophone

==== Production ====
- Stock Aitken Waterman – production (tracks 1, 7)
- Brother Beyond – production (tracks 6, 11, 12)
- Richard James Burgess – production (track 3)
- Don Was – production (tracks 4, 8)
- Michael H. Brauer – production (track 5); remix (tracks 8, 9)
- Mike Pela – production (track 8); sound engineer (tracks 4, 8, 11)
- Stephen Hague – remix (track 4)
- Ian Curnow – production (track 2); programming
- Steve Pigott – programming
- Chris Blair – mastering @ Abbey Road Studios
- Mike Duffy – sound engineer (track 2)
- Phil Harding – sound engineer, mix, production (track 2)
- Frank Roszak – sound engineer (track 3)
- Phil Brown – additional sound engineer (track 4)
- Phil Legg – sound engineer (tracks 5, 9, 10)
- Mike Ging – additional sound engineer (track 5)
- Mark Stent – sound engineer (track 6)
- Rafe McKenna – sound engineer, mix (track 12)
- Karen Hewitt – sound engineer (track 1)
- Yoyo – sound engineer (track 1)
- Mark McGuire – sound engineer (track 7)
- Pete Hammond – mix (tracks 1, 7)

==== Recording studios ====
Same as Get Even I, plus:

- Olympic Studios (II)
- The Manor (II)

==== Staff ====
- The Artful Dodgers Ltd – design
- Cindy Palmano – front cover photography
- Simon Fowler – other photography
- Simon Carter for Management One – management

== Charts ==
=== Weekly charts ===
Chart (1988–1989)	Peak position
Australian Albums Chart	89
European Albums Chart	37
German Albums (Media Control Charts)	63
UK Albums (OCC)	9

=== Certifications ===
Region	Certification	Certified units/sales
United Kingdom (BPI)	Platinum	300,000^{^}
^{^} Shipments figures based on certification alone.

== Release details ==
=== Get Even I ===
Country	Date	Format	Label	Catalogue
Italy	1988	vinyl LP	EMI Italiana / Parlophone	64 7467061
United Kingdom		CD	EMI / Parlophone	CDPCS 7314
Germany				CDP 7 46706 2

=== Get Even II ===
Country	Date	Format	Label	Catalogue
Italy		vinyl LP	EMI Italiana / Parlophone	64 7910691
United Kingdom		CD	EMI / Parlophone	CDPCS 7327
Germany				CDP 7 91069 2
