= The Girl I Used to Know =

"The Girl I Used To Know"

Single by Brother Beyond

from the album Trust (US Edition)
- Released: 8 December 1990
- Recorded: June–July 1990
- Genre: Pop
- Length: 4:24
- Label: Parlophone
- Songwriter: Carl Sturken and Evan Rogers
- Producer: Carl Sturken and Evan Rogers

Brother Beyond singles chronology
"Trust" (1990)	"The Girl I Used To Know" (1990)	"Just A Heartbeat Away" (1990)

"The Girl I Used to Know" is a 1990 pop single from British boyband Brother Beyond. The song was recorded specifically for the American edition of their second album, Trust, released in mid-1990, with the European edition, which was released in 1989, not containing the song. The song saw a change in the band's musical direction as this track was more funk-orientated and had less of the Motown sound of their earlier work. The song was written and produced by American producers Carl Sturken and Evan Rogers.

== Chart success ==
First released as a single in the US in mid-1990, the track proved to be the group's only single to enter the Billboard Hot 100, peaking at #27. Singer Nathan Moore has alleged the band were required to pay £100,000 to the mafia as part of a payola strategy to secure US airplay for the single.

The song also peaked at #62 in Canada. In the UK and Europe, the single was released as a non-album single in 1991, peaking at #48 in the UK in January of that year. This would be the group's last single to chart, and they disbanded not long after, with record label EMI dumping them amid promotion for the track. The song made the Top 10 in Portugal where it is sung today by supporters of FC Porto in a chant form.

== Music video ==
A music video for the song directed by Carl Sturken and Evan Rogers featuring the band driving in a convertible motor was shot in the Sahara Desert in Morocco in November 1990. These were interspersed with black and white studio scenes of the band performing, and in other scenes, at a diner.

== Charts ==
Chart (1990–1991)	Peak position
Canada	62
UK Singles (OCC)	48
UK Airplay (Music Week)	23
US Billboard Hot 100	27
US Cash Box Top 100	23
US CHR/Pop Top 40 (Radio & Records)	23
