= Steve Hart (singer) =

- Born: 29 February 1972 (age 54)
- Origin: London, England
- Genres: Dance-pop
- Occupations: Singer, actor
- Years active: 1993–present
- Label: EMI

Steve Hart (born 29 February 1972 in London) is an English pop singer and actor. He was hand-picked by Simon Cowell to be part of boy band pop-group Worlds Apart.

== Biography ==
Hart was chosen by Simon Cowell to become a member of boy band Worlds Apart, and signed a record deal with Arista Records/BMG Records.

Worlds Apart released their first album in the UK and after a number of concert tours and regular television appearances, the band became hugely popular in Europe, where they signed a record deal with EMI. Hart became lead singer and songwriter for the band. After winning Best Newcomers at the prestigious Bravo Supershow, Worlds Apart quickly became the biggest boyband in Germany.

Their success continued all through Europe, the Middle East, South America and Asia. With number one singles and albums, the band sold well over 10 million records.

As well as the official Worlds Apart magazine and numerous unofficial magazines, there was a Steve Hart magazine called Steve sold in newsagents after he was voted Sexiest Man in Europe for three years running.

Hart is an accomplished songwriter, and wrote many of Worlds Apart hits. He has also written songs for movies, TV shows, and numerous hits for other artists and recently wrote the song for the winner of The Voice UK 2016.

Hart has based himself in Los Angeles following the completion of his course at London's Webber Douglas Academy of Dramatic Art and his two-year Meisner Acting course at The Actors' Temple.

Hart is the global manager of The Jacksons (The Jackson 5).

He is also the creator of the TV show Mirror Mirror on the VERIZON App, Go90.

== Filmography ==
Film
Year	Film	Role	Notes
2015	Meet Pursuit Delange: The Movie	PC Hart	
2009	Green Street Hooligans	Paul	
2006	A-List	Dante	
2005	Forest of the Damned	John	
Television films
Year	Title	Role	Notes
2006	Christmas Do-Over	Joseph Henderson	
Shorts
Year	Title	Role	Notes
2010	Dragon Soccer	Steve	
2010	Meet Pursuit Delange	Steve the Barman	
2007	Traffic Warden	Mickey Willis	
