= The Harder I Try =

1988 single by Brother Beyond

Single by Brother Beyond

from the album Get Even
- B-side: "Remember Me"; "Sunset Bars"
- Released: 18 July 1988
- Studio: PWL (London, England)
- Length: 3:24
- Label: Parlophone
- Songwriter: Stock Aitken Waterman
- Producer: Stock Aitken Waterman

Brother Beyond singles chronology
"Can You Keep a Secret?" (1987)	"The Harder I Try" (1988)	"He Ain't No Competition" (1988)

"The Harder I Try" is a song by British boyband Brother Beyond. Written and produced by Stock Aitken Waterman, it was released on 18 July 1988 by Parlophone as the fifth single from the band's debut album, Get Even (1988). The song peaked at number two on the UK Singles Chart the following month. It was a number-one hit in Ireland and entered the top 10 in Iceland while peaking within the top 20 in Belgium, the Netherlands, New Zealand, and Switzerland.

== Background and writing ==
In 1988, British production team Stock Aitken Waterman auctioned off their services for the Young Variety Club of Great Britain charity. Label EMI won the auction, and British boyband Brother Beyond was selected by Pete Waterman to be produced by the trio. The group had met Waterman previously when they had worked at PWL Studios on a prior single, "Can You Keep A Secret", and the producer liked the band. Brother Beyond was by then a struggling pop act, with their first four singles only making the lower reaches of the UK top 75 singles chart. EMI saw this as their much-needed breakthrough and agreed with Waterman on producing the group.

"The Harder I Try" was written in the morning, singer Nathan Moore was called in to record vocals, which were laid down over 3–4 hours, while the rest of the band were not present and did not play on the record. The song samples the drum intro to the Isley Brothers' "This Old Heart of Mine", and was mainly produced with a Roland D-50 synth, which provided to the song "zingy new digital sounds, unimaginated bright metallics and super realistic horns and strings", according to Daniel Griffiths of musicradar.com.

== Critical reception ==
David Quantick from NME commented, "Oh aptest of titles! The Bruths return again with their most desp stab at the charts, a SAW-made-pseudo-Motown song. Nicely sung but dull." James Hamilton from Record Mirror wrote in his dance column, "Stock Aitken Waterman-created 129 3/4bpm old Motown-style fingersnappin' pulser, full of swimming harmonies and bright tinkles, and a sampled drum roll from the Isley Brothers 'This Old Heart of Mine'". Mike Soutar from Smash Hits named "The Harder I Try" Single of the Fortnight, adding, "It's quite obvious from the outset that Stock Aitken and Waterman are involved here, but happily they've not utterly swamped the song with their own inimitable "style". Instead it's very like old soul, very doo-wop, very "chicks" in the background warbling "ooooooooos", and very very catchy. Ah, the Yond' will make such good pop sensations..." Retrospectively, in 2020, Daniel Griffiths of musicradar.com listed it as one of the five songs by SAW that producers need to hear, adding that it was a "razor-sharp Motown sound-alike".

== Chart performance ==
When released in July 1988, "The Harder I Try" became an instant success in the UK: it started at number 43 on 30 July 1988 on the UK Singles Chart, reached the top ten three weeks later, peaked at number two for two weeks and remained on the chart for 14 weeks. The song was the 22nd best-selling single of 1988 in the country and received a silver disc awarded by the British Phonographic Industry. In Ireland, the single topped the chart for a sole week and ranked for five weeks. In Continental Europe, the single was mildly successful, reaching the top ten in Iceland only where it culminated at number nine, while it was a top-20 hit in Switzerland, the Netherlands and the Flanders region of Belgium. It reached number 24 in Finland, and missed the top 30 by two places in Germany, a position it held for non consecutive two weeks out of a 13-week chart run. On the Pan-European Hot 100 Singles chart compiled by Music & Media, it debuted at number 98 on 13 August 1988, attained number nine in its fifth and sixth weeks, and counted 16 weeks in the top 100. On the European Airplay Top 50, it had a 14-week chart run, with a peak at number 21 in its fourth week. Regarding the Oceanian markets, "The Harder I Try" was a top 15 hit in New Zealand, with five weeks of charting, while it just entered the top 80 in Australia.

== Track listings ==
- 7-inch single

A. "The Harder I Try" – 3:24
B. "Remember Me" – 4:32

- 12-inch single

A1. "The Harder I Try" (extended) – 6:05
B1. "Remember Me" (extended) – 6:48
B2. "The Harder I Try" (instrumental) – 3:43

- 12-inch remix single

A1. "The Harder I Try" (The Hardest mix) – 7:05
B1. "The Harder I Try" (seven inch) – 3:24
B2. "Remember Me" (extended) – 6:48

- CD single
1. "The Harder I Try" – 3:24
2. "Remember Me" (extended) – 5:35
3. "The Harder I Try" (extended) – 6:05
4. "Sunset Bars" – 4:25
- Japanese mini-CD single
1. "The Harder I Try"
2. "Sunset Bars"

== Charts ==
=== Weekly charts ===
Weekly chart performance for "The Harder I Try"
Chart (1988–1989)	Peak position
Australia (ARIA)	78
Belgium (Ultratop 50 Flanders)	20
Europe (Eurochart Hot 100)	9
Europe (European Airplay Top 50)	21
Finland (Suomen virallinen lista)	24
France Airplay (SNEP)	37
Iceland (Íslenski Listinn Topp 10)	9
Ireland (IRMA)	1
Israel (Israeli Singles Chart)	6
Luxembourg (Radio Luxembourg)	1
Netherlands (Dutch Top 40)	18
Netherlands (Single Top 100)	20
New Zealand (Recorded Music NZ)	15
Spain Airplay (Top 40 Radio)	40
Switzerland (Schweizer Hitparade)	13
UK Singles (Official Charts)	2
UK Airplay (Music & Media)	2
West Germany (GfK)	32

=== Year-end charts ===
1988 year-chart performance for "The Harder I Try"
Chart (1988)	Position
Europe (Eurochart Hot 100)	90
UK Singles (OCC)	22

== Certifications ==
Certifications for "The Harder I Try"
Region	Certification	Certified units/sales
United Kingdom (BPI)	Silver	250,000^{^}
^{^} Shipments figures based on certification alone.

== Release history ==
Release dates and formats for "The Harder I Try"
Region	Date	Format(s)	Label(s)	Ref.
United Kingdom	18 July 1988	7-inch vinyl; 12-inch vinyl; cassette	Parlophone	
United Kingdom	25 July 1988	CD	Parlophone	
United Kingdom	1 August 1988	12-inch remix vinyl	Parlophone	
Japan	20 January 1989	Mini-CD	EMI	
