= He Ain't No Competition =

Single by Brother Beyond

from the album Get Even
- B-side: "Call Me Lonely"
- Released: 24 October 1988
- Genre: Pop; dance-pop
- Length: 3:19
- Label: Parlophone
- Songwriters: Mike Stock; Matt Aitken; Pete Waterman
- Producer: Stock Aitken Waterman

Brother Beyond singles chronology
"The Harder I Try" (1988)	"He Ain't No Competition" (1988)	"Be My Twin" (1989)

"He Ain't No Competition" is a 1988 single released by British boyband Brother Beyond. It reached No.6 in the UK charts in September 1988. The song was written by its three producers, the Stock Aitken Waterman trio. The song is considered the follow-up to the highly commercially successful "The Harder I Try".

== Background ==
Record label EMI decided the band should work again with Stock Aitken Waterman following the major success of "The Harder I Try". The strategy was aimed at making the band's album marketable ahead of the Christmas period, but singer Nathan Moore felt the track fell short of its predecessor, believing it to be more "bubblegum" pop than its Motown-inspired counterpart.

The band had felt they wanted to move away from the poppy sound of "The Harder I Try", so they adopted novel techniques to develop this new sound blending elements of jazz fusion and hip hop, overdubbed with synthesized pop focus. Brother Beyond's album Get Even (from which the track is taken) had by the time of the release of the single already been released in Japan. It was repackaged for its release in the rest of the world, including the two SAW-produced tracks, and omitting two of the band's self-penned songs from the original release. This version was released in November 1988, and the album was also a top 10 hit.

== Critical reception ==
Jerry Smith of Music Week considered "He Ain't No Competition" like "The Harder I Try", as "another vacuous Stock, Aitken and Waterman track".

== Charts ==
Weekly chart performance for "He Ain't No Competition"
Chart (1988–1989)	Peak position
Australia (ARIA)	53
Belgium (Ultratop 50 Flanders)	32
Europe (European Hot 100)	20
Europe (European Airplay Top 50)	26
Finland (Suomen virallinen lista)	24
Ireland (IRMA)	4
Israel (IBA)	13
Luxembourg (Radio Luxembourg)	4
New Zealand (Recorded Music NZ)	19
UK Singles (OCC)	6
UK Airplay (Music & Media)	3
West Germany (GfK)	39
