= To the Beat of My Heart =

Single by Steps

from the album What the Future Holds
- Released: 16 January 2021
- Genre: Dance-pop
- Length: 3:10
- Label: BMG
- Songwriters: Sarah Thompson; Uzoechi Emenike; Annie Yuill; Benjamin Taylor; Brian Higgins; Keir MacCulloch; Kyle Mackenzie; Lee Voss; Matthew Grey; Miranda Cooper; Mollie King

Steps singles chronology
"Something in Your Eyes" (2020)	"To the Beat of My Heart" (2021)	"Heartbreak in This City" (2021)

Lyric video
- "To the Beat of My Heart" on YouTube

"To the Beat of My Heart" is a song recorded by British group Steps, released on 16 January 2021 as the third single from their sixth studio album, What the Future Holds (2020). The single peaked at number 33 on UK Download chart on 29 January 2021.

== Background and release ==
"To the Beat of My Heart" was released as a promotional single on 26 November 2020, before being released as the album's third single in January 2021. The single was confirmed on Claire Richard's Facebook page on 15 January 2021 and was sent to BBC Radio 2 as the single of the week, the following day. A remix EP was released on 22 January 2021.

== Tracklist ==
Digital EP

1. "To the Beat of My Heart" – 3:10
2. "Something in Your Eyes" - 3:01
3. "What the Future Holds" (Single Mix) - 3:48
4. "Hold My Heart" - 3:47
5. "Under My Skin" - 3:31

Digital Remix EP

1. "To the Beat of My Heart" – 3:10
2. "To the Beat of My Heart" (Shortland Tropical Remix) – 3:30
3. "To the Beat of My Heart" (Saint Remix Radio Edit) – 3:20
4. "What the Future Holds" (7th Heaven) [Edit] – 4:14
5. "Something in Your Eyes" (GMJS Poptastic Club Anthem) [Edit] – 3:41
6. "To the Beat of My Heart" (Saintt Remix) – 4:44

Remixes

1. "To the Beat of My Heart" – 3:10
2. "To the Beat of My Heart" (Shortland Tropical Remix) – 3:30
3. "To the Beat of My Heart" (Saint Remix Radio Edit) – 3:20
4. "To the Beat of My Heart" (GMJS Trance Mix) - 5:52
5. "To the Beat of My Heart" (Acoustic) - 3:03
6. "To the Beat of My Heart" (Shortland Tropical Extended Mix) - 6:17
7. "To the Beat of My Heart" (Saintt Remix) – 4:44

== Charts ==
Chart (2021)	Peak position
UK Singles Downloads (OCC)	33
