= Electric (Lisa Scott-Lee song) =

- UK CD2 cover

Single by Lisa Scott-Lee

from the album Never or Now
- B-side: "Lately"; "Make It Last Forever"; "Don't U Want My No.?"
- Released: 10 October 2005
- Recorded: 3 September 2005
- Genre: Pop
- Length: 3:15
- Label: Concept
- Songwriters: Guy Chambers; Ben Adams
- Producer: Richard Flack

Lisa Scott-Lee singles chronology
"Get It On" (2004)	"Electric" (2005)

Alternative cover
- UK CD1/AUS cover

"Electric" is the third single to be released by former Steps member Lisa Scott-Lee. The song was released on 10 October 2005 via Concept Records. It was written by songwriter Guy Chambers with former a1 member Ben Adams, and produced by Richard Flack.

== Music video ==
The music video for "Electric" features Lisa Scott-Lee performing the song with a band, with electric special effects. It was filmed in a studio in London, England.

== Totally Scott-Lee ==
The single was promoted on MTV reality show Totally Scott-Lee, where Scott-Lee stated that she wanted to get the single into the UK Top 10 or she would quit music altogether. Her previous single Get It On had charted at number 23 in the UK, despite being "B-list at Capital".

Despite widespread media attention for the series, Electric charted at #13 in the UK, therefore failing to reach the Top 10. This incident achieved notoriety, becoming the focus of an internet forum campaign to download it in 2016.

== Track listing ==
UK CD1
(CDCON68; Released: 10 October 2005)

1. "Electric" (Radio Edit) – 3:15
2. "Lately" – 3:55

UK CD2
(CDCON68X; Released: 10 October 2005)

1. "Electric" (Radio Edit) – 2:49
2. "Make It Last Forever" – 4:27
3. "Don't U Want My No.?" – 4:46
4. "Electric" (Video)

AUS CD
(Released: 24 April 2006)

1. "Electric" (Album Version) – 3:15
2. "Electric" (Firesigns 'Dirty on the Dancefloor' Remix) – 6:16
3. "Electric" (James Arnold 121 Re-Rub) – 6:10
4. "Electric" (Club Mix) – 6:43
5. "Lately" (Radio Edit) – 3:35

== Charts ==
Chart performance for "Electric"
Chart (2005–2006)	Peak position
Australia (ARIA)	60
UK Singles (OCC)	13

== Release history ==
Release history and formats for "Electric"
Region	Date	Ref.
United Kingdom	10 October 2005	
Australia	24 April 2006	
