= Pete Day =

English producer and musician (born 1970)

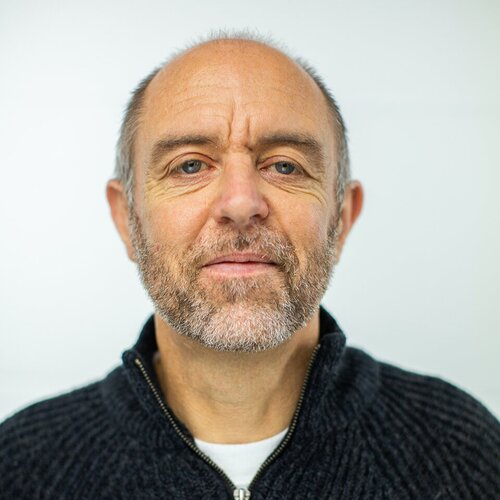
Pete Day 2023

Peter Day (born 1970) is an English recording/mixing engineer, record producer, and songwriter. Since the beginning of his musical career around 1987, he has been credited on numerous hit records from a diverse list of chart-topping artists that includes Kylie, Sybil, Bananarama,Lisa Scott-Lee, Jason Donavon, and Rick Astley. He is also known for his audio engineering with songwriting/ production trio SAW ('Stock Aitken Waterman'). This led to credits on esteemed records such as 'Band Aid II', which topped the UK singles charts for three weeks running. To date he is credited on 19 top ten hits; 8 of which reaching No. 1.

== Early career (1987–2001) ==
Pete began his career at PWL (now PWE) Studios in February 1987 as a Tape Operator; where he honed his skills using analogue systems. This first step into the music industry saw him editing recordings from Kylie's first tour of Japan, and within three years he had become Stock Aitken and Waterman's chief engineer. Throughout the next 3 years, he was involved in the recording and production of a variety of chart-hitting records; as well as recording theme tunes children's TV shows WWF With the splitting of Mike Stock from Pete Waterman in 1993, Peter helped set up Stock's new London studio in Southwark at 100 Union Street, SE1. Pete then continued as his recording and mix engineer; accompanying such artists as Nicki French and Robson & Jerome in the studio. During this period he helped write and produce material for female vocalists Tatjana and Suzann Rye, as well as disco kings "Lovetrain".

He spent some months at Unique recording studios in New York; after being asked by actor/ recording artist Idris Elba to remix tracks by hip hop group 'Dru Hill' and Sean 'P Diddy' Combs'. Elba suggested the production team adopt the name 'The London Boys' for the duration of the project, which they did. Pete disbanded with Mike Stock soon after.

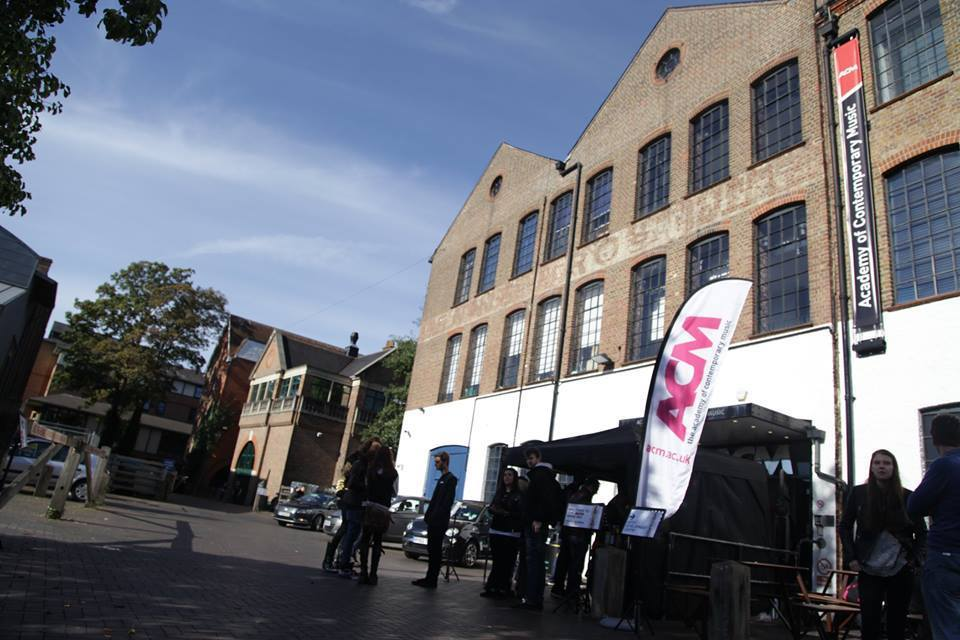
The Academy of Contemporary Music, where Pete Day taught for a year

Subsequently, he re-emerged as one half of DysonDay productions ltd in 1999– Phil Dyson, a former assistant/ keyboardist of Mike Stock studios, completing the duo. The team remixed tracks for Madasun, Faithless, Dido, and Rob Dougan – including his club song, "Clubbed to Death", (which was later released under the Point4 banner). While getting DysonDay productions off the ground, he spent a year teaching studio recording techniques at the Academy of Contemporary Music, close to his home in Guildford.

== Point4 (2001–present) ==
In 2001, he formed the songwriting/ production quartet Point4 with Phil Dyson, Paul (Bronze) Newton, and Daniel Sherman. They rapidly signed to BMG records as artists with their track 'The First Time', then went on to remix for such artists as Lemar and Atomic Kitten. Record producer Steve Lilywhite (who at the time was working as an A&R for Mercury records) signed ex 'Steps' vocalist Lisa Scott Lee's songs 'Lately', 'Too Far Gone', and 'I'll Wait For you', from her debut album 'Never or now'. Lilywhite eventually could not complete the album, as he joined Columbia Records in 2005, and became engrossed in other projects. Under the alias '56K', Point4 recorded and produced vocalist Bejay Browne's cover of the Duran Duran song, "Save a Prayer", in 2002, after signing to Edel Records (additionally: ‘Gallo records' of South Africa, 'Kontor Records', Germany, and Sony, Australia).

In the same year, Point4 were signed by Steve Allen to WEA/ London Records under an ulterior name ('Stylus' ) to create and release the single 'Thrill Me'- a track which featured vocals from female singer/ songwriter Jo Jeffries; of whom went on to co-write many songs with Point4.

Lisa Scott Lee's songs "Lately" and "Too Far Gone", produced by Point4, numbered 6 and 11 (respectively) in the 2003 UK charts.

In 2004 Day and Newton separated from Dyson and Sherman, but retained the name and company Point4- relocating to a new studio facility in Fulham. Pete moved to Brixham, Devon, but Point4 remains an active sound engineering group- operating recording sessions between both their London and Devon-based studio facilities. After his move to Brixham, Pete built his own studio and set up Floorless Music LTD, expanding to local talent in the Devon area and signing to Mibe Music NY for advertising and library music creation. Together with Dave Blomberg and Mibe Music, Pete has created and published music for well-known brands and channels such as Netflix, NFL, NBC, CBS, Rio 2016 Olympics, BBC, MTV Catfish and The History Channel.

In 2005, they were requested by The Bank Advertising Agency to remake 'Brakes On' by French music duo 'Air' for their 'Red Tag' campaign for South African Breweries Peroni, which was a successful European launch into the UK running the new version in cinema advertising.

A year later in 2006, Dyson, Day, Jeffries, and fellow songwriter/ keyboardist Huw Williams signed to US-based dance label OM Records, and released their electronic club song 'I'll do you' under the new alias 'Rookiee'. The track underwent some remixing- namely, by artists Andy Caldwell, Richard Dinsdale, and Vernon & Dacosta.

Pete returned at no. 1 in the UK album chart with the release of Kylie Minogue's, Step Back in Time: The Definitive Collection, after its release in 2019 by BMG Rights Management.

As well as recently attaining his certified Pro Tools 'Expert' 310m qualification, Pete is a certified schools programme co-ordinator for Avid, and teaches Music Technology at South Devon College. Along with fellow teacher and acoustician Dan Taylor, he also designed and built the recording studio at the Vantage Point site.

Since 2014, Pete has been HE Programme Leader for Music Production and Sound Engineering at dBs Institute of Sound and Digital Technologies. While working for dBs Institute, Pete attained his MA in Sound Innovation.

== Discography ==
Chart Year	Artist	Title	Credit	Official UK Chart Position
1987	Ferry Aid	Let It Be	assistant engineer	1
1987	Rick Astley	[Whenever You Need Somebody	assistant engineer	1
1989	Kylie Minogue	Enjoy Yourself	assistant engineer	1
1989	Band Aid II	Do They Know It's Christmas?	assistant engineer	1
1992	Kylie Minogue	Greatest Hits	assistant engineer	1
1995	Robson & Jerome	Unchained Melody/ White Cliffs of Dover	engineer	1
1996	Robson & Jerome	What Becomes of the Broken Hearted/Saturday Night At The Movies/ You'll Never Walk Alone	engineer	1
2019	Kylie Minogue	Step Back in Time: The Definitive Collection	engineer	1
2026	Manor Close	You & I	Mastering engineer	n/a
