= What the Future Holds (song) =

Single by Steps

from the album What the Future Holds
- Released: 9 September 2020
- Genre: Dance-pop; electropop
- Length: 3:49 (Single Mix); 4:27 (Full Version)
- Label: BMG
- Songwriters: Greg Kurstin; Sia Furler
- Producers: Barry Stone; Julian Gingell

Steps singles chronology
"Dancing with a Broken Heart" (2017)	"What the Future Holds" (2020)	"Something in Your Eyes" (2020)

Music video
- "What the Future Holds" on YouTube

"What the Future Holds" is a song recorded by British group Steps for their sixth studio album of the same name (2020).

== Background and release ==
On 7 September 2020, Steps announced that they would release their sixth album What the Future Holds on 27 November, preceded by its title track, in addition to embarking on a United Kingdom arena tour in 2021. In a message released online, the group stated "We couldn't keep it a secret any longer!" It is their first album to be released with their new record label based in the United States, BMG.

The song "What the Future Holds" premiered on Zoe Ball's The Radio 2 Breakfast Show on 8 September and was released as the lead single the same day on download and streaming platforms.

A remix of the single by Cahill was released on 30 September.

The full version of the song (found as the last track on the digital version of the What the Future Holds album) features a solo verse shared by Faye Tozer & Lisa Scott Lee. The verse is cut on the Single Mix of the song.

== Promotion ==
=== Music video ===
The official music video for "What the Future Holds" was filmed in London at the start of 2020 and premiered on 11 September. It was directed by Max Giwa and Dania Pasquini.

=== Live performances ===
Steps performed the single live for the first time on 18 September 2020 on BBC One's The One Show, featuring choreography from the official music video.

== Composition ==
Written by Greg Kurstin and Sia, "What the Future Holds" lasts for a duration of three minutes and forty-nine seconds.

== Track listing ==
Digital download/streaming

1. "What the Future Holds" (single mix) – 3:49

Digital Cahill Remix single

1. "What the Future Holds" (Cahill Remix) (Edit) – 3:18
2. "What the Future Holds" (Cahill Remix) – 6:52

Under My Skin Digital Single

1. "Under My Skin" – 3:31
2. "What the Future Holds" (single mix) – 3:49
3. "What the Future Holds" (Cahill Remix) (Edit) – 3:18
4. "What the Future Holds" (Alphalove Remix) (Edit) – 4:17

Remixes

1. "What the Future Holds" (Single Mix) - 3:48
2. "What the Future Holds" (Cahill Remix) [Edit] - 3:41
3. "What the Future Holds" (Alphalove Remix) [Edit] - 4:17
4. "What the Future Holds" (7th Heaven Remix) [Edit] - 4:14
5. "What the Future Holds" (Acoustic) - 4:22
6. "What the Future Holds" (Cahill Remix) - 6:51
7. "What the Future Holds" (Alphalove Extended Remix) - 5:18
8. "What the Future Holds" (7th Heaven Club Mix) - 6:25
9. "What the Future Holds" (Cahill Club Edit) - 4:47

== Personnel ==
Adapted from Tidal.

- Sia Furler – writer
- Julian Gingell – producer, engineer, keyboard, programmer
- Pete Hofmann – mixer
- Greg Kurstin – writer
- Lee Latchford-Evans – lead vocals
- Claire Richards – lead vocals
- Lisa Scott-Lee – lead vocals
- Barry Stone – producer, engineer, keyboard, programmer
- Faye Tozer – lead vocals
- Ian "H" Watkins – lead vocals

== Charts ==
Chart (2020)	Peak position
Scottish Singles Sales (Official Charts)	10
UK Singles Downloads (Official Charts)	10
UK Indie (Official Charts)	25
