= Something in Your Eyes (Jenny Silver song) =

2011 song by Jenny Silver

Single by Jenny Silver
- Released: 2011
- Genre: Europop
- Songwriters: Thomas G:son; Henrik Sethsson; Erik Bernholm

Jenny Silver singles chronology
"A Place to Stay" (2010)	"Something in Your Eyes" (2011)

Audio video
- "Something in Your Eyes" on YouTube

"Something in Your Eyes" is a song written by Thomas G:son, Henrik Sethsson and Erik Bernholm. Performed by Jenny Silver in the first semifinal of Melodifestivalen 2011 in Luleå, the song made it to Andra Chansen, where it was knocked out of the contest.

The song also stayed at the top 10 chart Svensktoppen for three weeks before leaving the chart.

== Chart positions ==
Chart (2010)	Peak position
Sweden (Sverigetopplistan)	59

== Steps version ==
"Something in Your Eyes"

Single by Steps

from the album What the Future Holds
- Released: 27 October 2020
- Genre: Dance-pop
- Length: 3:01
- Label: BMG
- Songwriters: Thomas G:Son; Henrik Sethsson; Erik Bernholm
- Producers: Barry Stone; Julian Gingell

Steps singles chronology
"What the Future Holds" (2020)	"Something in Your Eyes" (2020)	"To the Beat of My Heart" (2021)

Music videos
- "Something in Your Eyes" on YouTube; "Something in Your Eyes" (remix) on YouTube

British group Steps recorded a cover of "Something in Your Eyes" for their sixth studio album, What the Future Holds (2020). It was released as the album's second single on 27 October 2020.

=== Background and promotion ===
The single premiered on BBC Radio 2. Steps described the track as "so much fun", adding that it was "a nod to old Steps... You can't help but sing along and feel uplifted by it."

=== Music video ===
The official music video for "Something in Your Eyes" premiered online on 28 October 2020. It was directed by Carly Cussen.

=== Track listing ===
Remixes

1. "Something in your Eyes" - 3:01
2. "Something in your Eyes" (7th Heaven Remix) [Edit]- 3:01
3. "Something in your Eyes" (GMJS Poptastic Radio Edit) - 3:42
4. "Something in your Eyes" (Acoustic) - 3:06
5. "Something in your Eyes" (7th Heaven Remix) – 5:53
6. "Something in your Eyes" (GMJS Poptastic Club Anthem) - 7:10

=== Reception ===
"Something in Your Eyes" was added to the "B List" on BBC Radio 2's New Music Playlist for the week commencing 7 November 2020. It was also made record of the week on Tring Radio.

=== Personnel ===
- Lead vocals – Faye Tozer, Claire Richards, Lisa Scott-Lee
- Background vocals – Lee Latchford Evans, Ian "H" Watkins

=== Charts ===
Chart (2020)	Peak position
Scotland Singles (OCC)	22
UK Singles Downloads (OCC)	21
