= Tim Fornara =

British producer, director (born 1977)

Timothy William Fornara is a British producer/director now based in New York.

== Biography ==
Fornara has credits on several albums, including the debut album of Laura Critchley. In 2005 he was Colin Farrell's photo double for the Oliver Stone film Alexander and has also appeared in the teen movie What a Girl Wants and children's TV series The One.

In 1997, he was chosen to succeed Schelim Hannan in the British boyband Worlds Apart. In July 2000, Fornara left the band to create another, Withmey and Fornara, later renamed as The Blue Print before becoming The Setup Productions. He enjoyed success writing songs for country artist Laura Critchley and the band Kojo.

In 2006, Fornara began a successful hosting Career in the U.K., working for Sky TV, BBC and becoming the face of Film 24, before stepping behind the camera to produce and direct content.

He later founded a television and film production company, Kobiyoshi and in 2010 made his first commission for Film24 FilmXtra Uncut made a hugely successful web series Finding Pelé which followed 2 street ballers on a voyage of discovery around South Africa during the 2010 World Cup. The players did meet Pelé. After that Fornara relocated to New York and has since made shows including for Would You Rather starring Graham Norton for BBC America, a new series for MTV out this winter and the Film insider series for Plum TV, which he also hosted. He also produced the official YouTube Channel Spacelab, which has 58 million views worldwide and 100,000 subscribers. Fornara is currently developing a new comedy web series and will make a second season of Style setters for Tresemmé in the fall.

== Sources ==
- Danny Harris – Generate
- Jim Biederman – Jimco Productions
- Kathleen Grace – YouTube
