= What the Future Holds =

2020 studio album by Steps

Studio album by Steps
- Released: 27 November 2020
- Genres: Pop; dance-pop; electropop
- Length: 47:37
- Label: BMG
- Producers: Julian Gingell; Steve Smith; Robin Stjernberg; Barry Stone

Steps chronology
Tears on the Dancefloor (2017)	What the Future Holds (2020)	What the Future Holds Pt. 2 (2021)

Singles from What the Future Holds
- 1. "What the Future Holds" Released: 9 September 2020; 2. "Something in Your Eyes" Released: 27 October 2020; 3. "To the Beat of My Heart" Released: 16 January 2021

What the Future Holds is the sixth studio album by the British group Steps and was their first album to be released with their new record label BMG on 27 November 2020. They had originally intended to release the project in the Spring, however the global outbreak of the COVID-19 pandemic and imposing of lockdown resulted in a temporary delay of promotion. The album was preceded by singles "What the Future Holds" and "Something in Your Eyes". Promotional tracks "Under My Skin", "Hold My Heart" and "To the Beat of My Heart" were also released, the latter becoming the album's third single in January 2021.

In April 2021, Steps announced what was intended to be a deluxe edition of What the Future Holds would now be released as their seventh studio album, What the Future Holds Pt.2.

== Background ==
"Its been a long time coming but we are so proud to present the next chapter to the Steps story."

— Claire Richards on announcing the new album.

Steps came off of their planned break in 2017 in celebration of their twentieth anniversary of their formation. It was revealed that they would be releasing their fifth studio album, Tears on the Dancefloor in April followed by the Party on the Dancefloor Tour in November.

On 7 September 2020, Steps announced the release of their sixth studio album, called What the Future Holds, via their social media accounts. It was revealed by a series of enigmatic posts, with references to the past and the future, as well as imagery of a crystal ball. It was followed by a message posted on their official Twitter account saying "We couldn't keep it a secret any longer!!" The title track was revealed as the lead single on the same day while a supporting arena tour of the United Kingdom was announced on 8 September, set to take place in November 2021.

== Title and theme ==
The title of the album, its musical composition, artwork and promotional campaign originated solely from the name of the title track, "What the Future Holds". Written by Sia and Greg Kurstin, the song's lyrics are "a reflection how they feel now as a group and how far they've come" since their formation 23 years prior. In an interview with the Official Charts Company, Ian "H" Watkins explained that the group decided to record another album following the release of their fifth studio album Tears on the Dancefloor (2017) and the completion of its supporting arena tour, the Party on the Dancefloor Tour, purely based on the sound of the song alone. The concept of the lyrics "One foot in the past, one foot in the future" is a reflection of where Steps are in their career and provides the basis for the project and upcoming tour, with Faye Tozer stating that the latter will consist of the "nostalgia" of their back catalogue while contemporaneously blending it with their new music.

== Release ==
The album was announced via their official group social media on 7 September 2020, with a release date set for 27 November; it is their first album to be released with their new record label, BMG. Steps had originally planned to announce the release of the album and its accompanying What the Future Holds Tour earlier in the spring of 2020, however the global outbreak of the COVID-19 pandemic and subsequent lockdown restrictions resulted in a temporary pause to the promotional campaign to Autumn, when the group announced that they could no longer keep the project a secret.

Speaking about the eventual announcement, Lee Latchford-Evans commented in an interview with Sky News that the general response was people saying "Steps have saved 2020" and that it was a positive feeling that despite the uncertainty around the pandemic, it was "nice to have people be very positive towards us again." He continued to reveal that the group had first heard the title track during their Party on the Dancefloor Tour nearly three years prior, while they were deciding whether or not to "carry on" with potentially recording new music after the tour; the music video was filmed almost a year earlier in preparation for the original Spring release. Richards added that the timing of the announcement was not in order to seek advantage in a "horrendous situation", describing the album's title as coincidental, and that it felt like the right time after having worked on the project for several years.

== Critical reception ==
Professional ratings
Review scores
Source	Rating
Entertainment Focus	5/5 stars
Gigwise	6/10 stars
The Independent	3/5 stars
musicOMH	4/5 stars
Renowned for Sound	(positive)

What the Future Holds received generally favourable reviews from music critics and writers. Pip Ellwood-Hughes from Entertainment Focus gave the album a perfect score, commenting that the album showcases "wider range of versatility and bringing back those harmony-filled ballads that always featured on their early albums." He added, "What the Future Holds never attempts to jump onto current trends." In contrast, Roisin O'Connor of the The Independent wrote, "So it's amusing that this year's What the Future Holds, a sugary rush of high-octane bangers, fits so well into 2020's onslaught of maximalist dance-pop. After more than two decades, Steps are finally on-trend." TotalNtertainment said in a review, "it's great to see that, not only have Steps retained their sound but have brought it dancing energetically into 2020 and beyond." Harrison Smith of Gigwise shared the same opinion stating, "whilst the group may have a staple sound, they are more than willing to adapt to current trends." musicOMH's Nick Smith described the album as "bold and brilliant," saying "it's rather refreshing to hear Steps revelling so exultantly in the unashamedly feel-good aspect of their sound." Renowned for Sound's Brendon Veevers stated, "It is without a doubt pop quintet Steps who deliver THE record of the year ... still producing top grade hits."

== Commercial performance ==
What the Future Holds debuted at number two on the UK Albums Chart on December 4, 2020, with first-week sales of 37,394 units (9,000 copies behind Gary Barlow's Music Played by Humans after a week of close battle).

== Singles ==
Lead single "What the Future Holds" premiered on Zoe Ball's BBC The Radio 2 Breakfast Show on 8 September and was released as the lead single the same day on download and streaming platforms. The official music video for "What the Future Holds" was filmed in London at the start of 2020 and premiered on 11 September. It was directed by Max Giwa and Dania Pasquini. Although the single failed to chart on the Official UK Singles Chart Top 100, it debuted and peaked at number 10 on the UK Singles Downloads Chart.

The second single was a cover of Jenny Silver's "Something in Your Eyes". Steps described the track as "so much fun", adding that it was "a nod to old Steps... You can't help but sing along and feel uplifted by it." Pip Ellwood-Hughes for Entertainment Focus believed the song "gleefully celebrates the past via a classic, ABBA-esque chorus, a joyous key change and a brilliantly unexpected staggered outro". The official music video for "Something in Your Eyes", directed by Carly Cussen, premiered online on 28 October 2020. The single debuted at number 21 on the UK Singles Downloads Chart.

"To the Beat of My Heart" was released as a promotional single on 26 November 2020, before being released as the album's third single in January 2021. The single was confirmed on Claire Richard's Facebook page on 15 January 2021 and was sent to BBC Radio 2 as the single of the week, the following day. A remix EP was released on 22 January 2021. The following week, the single peaked at number 33 on UK Download chart.

"Under My Skin" was released as a promotional track in early October 2020. It was digitally released as an EP containing the "What the Future Holds" single and remixes from Cahill and Alphalove. Another promotional track was released 13 November titled, "Hold My Heart".

== Track listing ==
Track listing adapted from Apple Music. All tracks produced by Barry stone and Julian Gingell, with the exception of "To The Beat of My Heart", produced by Steve Smith, and "Hold My Heart", produced by Robin Stjernberg. The physical CD has 12 tracks, the Single Mix of What The Future Holds is not included and has the full length version.

What the Future Holds track listing
No.	Title	Writer(s)	Length
1.	"What the Future Holds" (single mix)	Greg Kurstin; Sia Furler	3:48
2.	"Something in Your Eyes"	Erik Bernholm; Henrik Sethsson; Thomas G:son	3:02
3.	"Clouds"	Emma Rohan; Grace Barker; Jez Ashurst	3:55
4.	"To the Beat of My Heart"	Sarah Thompson; Uzoechi Emenike; Annie Yuill; Benjamin Taylor; Brian Higgins; Keir MacCulloch; Kyle Mackenzie; Lee Voss; Matthew Grey; Miranda Cooper; Mollie King	3:10
5.	"Father's Eyes"	Arnthor Birgisson; Ina Wroldsen	3:51
6.	"One Touch"	Chris Wahle; Laura White; Neil Treppas	3:51
7.	"Under My Skin"	Charlie Walshe; Farley Arvidsson; Rachel Furner	3:31
8.	"Heartbreak in This City"	Karl Twigg; Stella Attar	3:27
9.	"Come and Dance with Me"	Fiona Bevan; Carl Ryden	3:45
10.	"Don't You Leave Us Halfway"	Christian Fast; Märta Grauers; Tania Doko	3:10
11.	"To the One"	Hannah Robinson; Stone; Gingell	3:54
12.	"Hold My Heart"	Isa Molin; Robin Stjernberg	3:47
13.	"What the Future Holds"	Kurstin; Furler	4:27
Total length:			47:37

What the Future Holds - Night In Edition

13. What The Future Holds (Acoustic Version) 4:23
14. Something in Your Eyes (Acoustic Version) 3:06
15. What the Future Holds [Official Video]
16. Something in Your Eyes [Official Video]
17. Something in Your Eyes [Choreo Video]
18. Under My Skin [Live Video]
19. What the Future Holds [Live Video]
20. Something in Your Eyes [Live Video]

What the Future Holds - Night Out Edition

13. What the Future Holds (7th Heaven Radio Mix) 4:15
14. Something in Your Eyes (GMJS Poptastic Radio Edit) 3:42
15. Under My Skin (Shortland Remix Radio Edit) 2:43
16. To the Beat of My Heart (Saint Remix) 4:45
17. What the Future Holds (Cahill Club Edit) 4:48
18. Father's Eyes (Shanghai Surprise Edit) 3:29
19. Heartbreak in This City (Saint Remix Radio Edit) 4:10
20. Clouds (Conway Remix Radio Edit) 3:30
21. What the Future Holds (7th Heaven Club Mix) 6:25
22. Something in Your Eyes (GMJS Poptastic Club Anthem) 7:10

== Charts ==
Chart performance for What the Future Holds
Chart (2020)	Peak position
Australian Albums (ARIA)	26
Belgian Albums (Ultratop Flanders)	59
Irish Albums (Official Charts)	26
Irish Independent Albums (IRMA)	2
Scottish Albums (Official Charts)	2
UK Albums (Official Charts)	2
UK Independent Albums (Official Charts)	1

== Certifications ==
Certifications for What The Future Holds
Region	Certification	Certified units/sales
United Kingdom (BPI)	Silver	60,000^{‡}
^{‡} Sales+streaming figures based on certification alone.

== Release history ==
Release history for What the Future Holds
Region	Date	Version(s)	Format(s)	Label	Refs.
Various	27 November 2020	Standard	Box set; cassette; CD; digital download; streaming; vinyl	BMG	
Various	27 November 2020	Nights In Edition	Digital download	BMG	
Various	27 November 2020	Nights Out Edition	Digital download	BMG	
