= Drive On (song) =

1989 single by Brother Beyond

Single by Brother Beyond

from the album Trust
- B-side: "Drive On (Dream On)"
- Released: 16 October 1989
- Length: 4:06
- Label: Parlophone
- Songwriters: Carl Fysh, David White
- Producers: Keith Cohen, Jeff Lorber

Brother Beyond singles chronology
"Can You Keep a Secret?" (re-mix) (1989)	"Drive On" (1989)	"When Will I See You Again" (1989)

"Drive On" is a song by British pop music group Brother Beyond, released as the lead single from their second album, Trust, on 16 October 1989. It was their fifth consecutive hit to peak inside the top 40 of the UK Singles Chart, reaching number 39 in November 1989.

== Track listings ==
7-inch and cassette single

A. "Drive On" – 4:06
B. "Drive On (Dream On)" – 3:38

12-inch single

A. "Drive On" (So Strong mix) – 6:23
B. "Drive On" (Apple mix) – 6:05

Limited-edition 12-inch single

A. "Drive On" (Auto mix) – 5:53
B. "Drive On" (Dr Boozie's Revenge mix) – 4:58

CD single

1. "Drive On"
2. "Drive On" (So Strong mix)
3. "Be My Twin" (US remix)

Japanese mini-CD single

1. "Drive On"
2. "Drive On" (So Strong mix)

== Charts ==
Chart (1989)	Peak position
Netherlands (Single Top 100)	74
Spain Airplay (Top 40 Radio)	39
UK Singles (Official Charts)	39
UK Airplay (Music & Media)	13

== Release history ==
Region	Date	Format(s)	Label(s)	Ref.
United Kingdom	16 October 1989	7-inch vinyl; 12-inch vinyl; CD; cassette	Parlophone	
Japan	18 January 1990	Mini-CD	EMI	
Australia	29 January 1990	7-inch vinyl; 12-inch vinyl; cassette	Parlophone	
