= Be My Twin =

1989 single by Brother Beyond

Single by Brother Beyond

from the album Get Even
- B-side: "Broken Life"
- Released: 9 January 1989
- Length: 3:24
- Label: Parlophone
- Songwriters: Carl Fysh; David White
- Producer: Brother Beyond

Brother Beyond singles chronology
"He Ain't No Competition" (1988)	"Be My Twin" (1989)	"Can You Keep a Secret?" (1989 mix) (1989)

"Be My Twin" is a song by British boyband Brother Beyond, written by band members Carl Fysh and David White. Released on 9 January 1989, the single reached No. 14 on the UK Singles Chart and No. 13 on the Irish Singles Chart.

== Background ==
Brother Beyond's album Get Even (from which the track is taken) had been released in Japan by the time the single was issued. It was repackaged for its release in the rest of the world, including the two Stock Aitken & Waterman-produced tracks, and omitting two of the band's self-penned songs from the original release.

== Music video ==
The music video was filmed in Hong Kong with the concept that each band member has a twin.

== Track listings ==
7-inch single

A. "Be My Twin"
B. "Broken Life"

UK 12-inch single

A1. "Be My Twin" (extended)
B1. "Broken Life"
B2. "Be My Twin" (instrumental)

UK CD single

1. "Be My Twin"
2. "Broken Life"
3. "Be My Twin" (extended)

US 12-inch single

A1. "Be My Twin" (extended mix) – 6:35
A2. "Broken Life" – 3:48
B1. "Be My Twin" (12-inch vocal club mix) – 7:10
B2. "Be My Twin" (Devotion dub) – 7:37

== Charts ==
Chart (1989)	Peak position
Europe (Eurochart Hot 100)	47
Ireland (IRMA)	13
Israel (IBA)	28
Luxembourg (Radio Luxembourg)	7
UK Singles (Official Charts)	14
UK Airplay (Music & Media)	2
West Germany (GfK)	53
