= Andy Scott-Lee =

British singer (born 1980)

- Born: Robert Andrew Jason Scott-Lee; 29 March 1980 (age 46); Rhyl, Wales, United Kingdom
- Genres: Pop, R&B
- Occupation: Singer
- Instrument: Vocals
- Years active: 2002–present
- Formerly of: 3SL

Andy Scott-Lee (born Robert Andrew Jason Scott-Lee; 29 March 1980) is a British singer from Rhyl, Wales. He is the brother of Steps singer Lisa Scott-Lee.

== Career ==
=== Music ===
Scott-Lee was a member of the group 3SL, who had UK top 20 singles with "Take It Easy" and "Touch Me Tease Me" (a Case cover) in 2002. They were signed to Sony (Epic). After the group broke up, Scott-Lee appeared in the second series of Pop Idol, making it to the final seven out of 100,000 entrants. He was also a featured artist on the Pop Idol album and single, which both entered the UK charts at number two as well as performing in the Pop Idol UK arena tour. He was also a member of the group G*Mania.

In 2005, Scott-Lee took part in the qualifying rounds to represent the United Kingdom in the 2005 Eurovision Song Contest, where he was up against Javine, Katie Price, Tricolore and Gina G. He sang "Guardian Angel", a song composed by Lee Ryan (from the boyband Blue) and Rob Persaud, and came third.

He released his first solo single "Unforgettable" in 2008. The same year, he was asked to judge and perform at the Miss England Grand Finals.

=== Television appearances ===
Scott-Lee's other TV appearances have been as a celebrity guest on ITV's The Mint; on the BBC programme Never Mind the Buzzcocks in January 2008; on the Irish singing show You're a Star in February 2008; on series nine of Ant & Dec's Saturday Night Takeaway in 2009 in their sketch "Escape from Takeaway Prison". He has also been seen as part of his sister's MTV reality TV show Totally Scott-Lee.

== Personal life ==
He married Michelle Heaton in 2006, they separated in 2008, and later divorced. He later married Lydia Louisa, who competed in the thirteenth series of Big Brother on Channel 5.
