= 3SL =

Welsh pop group

- Origin: Cardiff, Wales
- Genres: Pop, dance-pop
- Years active: 2001-2002
- Label: Sony
- Past members: Andy Scott-Lee; Anthony Scott-Lee; Steve Scott-Lee

3SL were a Welsh pop group made up of brothers Steve, Anthony "Ant", and Andy Scott-Lee. Originally from Rhyl in North Wales, they were managed by their elder sister Lisa, a member of the pop group Steps. The group's first single, "Take It Easy", reached No. 11 on the UK Singles Chart in April 2002. Their follow-up single was a cover of Case's "Touch Me, Tease Me", which was more successful than the original version, reaching number 16, but was less successful than "Take It Easy", and the group was subsequently dropped by their record label, Sony, leaving their only album project unreleased. The group later toured the country with S Club 7 as part of their S Club Carnival tour, and band member Andy Scott-Lee later appeared on the second series of the ITV talent show Pop Idol, placing seventh.

== Discography ==
=== Singles ===
- "Take It Easy" (April 2002) - UK No. 11
- "Touch Me, Tease Me" (October 2002) - No. 16
