= Lisa Scott-Lee =

Welsh pop singer (born 1975)

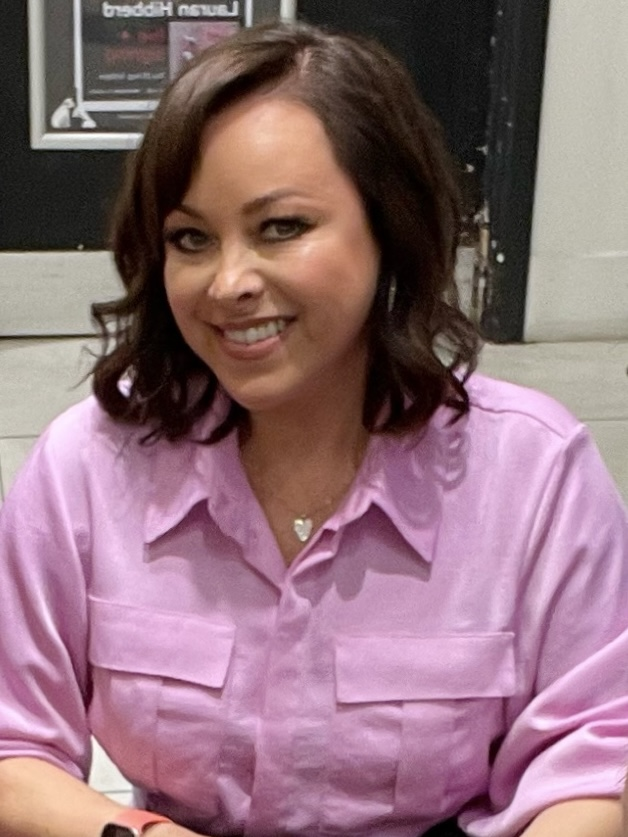
- Scott-Lee in 2022

Background information
- Born: 5 November 1975 (age 51); St Asaph, Wales
- Genres: Pop, dance-pop
- Occupations: Singer, songwriter, dancer
- Years active: 1997–present
- Labels: Fontana, Mercury, Concept
- Member of: Steps

Lisa Scott-Lee (born 5 November 1975) is a Welsh singer from St Asaph, Wales. She is a member of the pop group Steps, formed in 1997. Scott-Lee signed a record deal with Mercury Records and launched a solo career in 2003, achieving only minor success after the release of debut single "Lately". She was dropped after her second solo single. She released her debut solo album Never or Now in 2007 through Concept Records.

== Early life and education ==
Lisa Scott-Lee was born on 5 November 1975 in St Asaph to parents Anthony and Janet. Her younger siblings are Andy, Anthony and Steven, who were in the group 3SL. She attended the Italia Conti Academy of Theatre Arts stage school. Her grandfather, Jason Scott Lee, was the first footballer of Chinese heritage to play for Manchester United albeit in wartime league matches.

== Career ==
=== 1997–2001: early career with Steps ===
Scott-Lee is a member of the UK pop group Steps. The group, which came together in 1997 and had 14 top 5 singles in the UK, split up on Boxing Day 2001 before reforming in May 2011.

Ever since the group's break-up, rumours had been circulating that they would reunite in one form or another. In 2009, Lee Latchford-Evans revealed that the group had been approached to perform a series of concerts. He hinted that a future reunion was possible, but that "it isn't the right time right now".

=== 2002–2008: Solo career and Totally Scott-Lee ===
Scott-Lee spent a short time managing her three younger brothers, including Andy, in a group of their own called 3SL. After little success they were dropped from their label and disbanded. Scott-Lee then signed a solo recording contract with Mercury Records, releasing her debut solo single, "Lately", which she co-wrote, in May 2003. The song became a UK top 10 hit, peaking at number 6. On 8 September 2003, Scott-Lee released her second single (which she also co-wrote), "Too Far Gone", which narrowly missed out on the top 10, peaking at number 11. Mercury parted company with Scott-Lee when they feared her success as a solo artist might be limited, which left her without a record company. As a result, her album, Unleashed, was cancelled, although promotional samplers had already been released.

Scott-Lee went on to be featured in the Girls of FHM music video for "Do You Think I'm Sexy?" in the summer of 2004, while preparing to release a new single, "Get It On", with Intenso Project. As both Scott-Lee and Intenso Project did not have a record deal, the music video was self-funded. Eventually Ministry of Sound picked up the song and released it on 28 November 2004. Despite numerous personal appearances, various promotional events, and a B-list placing on Capital Radio, the song peaked at number 23. The "Get It On" music video, however, was ranked in the FHM top 100 sexiest music videos.

In the summer of 2005 it was revealed that a camera crew from MTV UK had been following Scott-Lee, as well as her husband (Johnny Shentall of Hear'Say), her brother (Andy Scott-Lee), her publicist (Sean Borg), her manager (Nathan Moore), and her brother's girlfriend Michelle Heaton (of Liberty X) for nearly a year. The show, which was intended as the UK version of MTV's US hit Newlyweds: Nick and Jessica followed Scott-Lee's attempts to revitalise her career. In the show, titled Totally Scott-Lee (originally Scott-Lee Unlimited), Scott-Lee vowed that she would quit the music industry if her next release missed the UK top 10.

Scott-Lee was signed to a small record label, Concept Records, and began recording songs for her next single. Concept chose "Electric" and started making plans for its release. The single had to be released on 10 October 2005 to meet with deadlines for the show, with the chart position to be revealed live on MTV on Sunday 16 October 2005. Roseann McBride, assistant to managing director Max Bloom of Concept Records went on record several times to indicate that she was against the record being released on this date, as it would have very little promotion time (5 weeks as opposed to the usual 8–10 weeks). The song was released as planned, but despite a television show backing her and extensive media coverage, it failed to reach the top ten, charting at number 13.

Following the chart reveal Scott-Lee indicated she regretted her earlier vow, admitting she had only agreed to it to please other people and wished she had never said it.

Following the failure of "Electric" to achieve its targeted top 10 position, plans were announced to release "Electric" in Japan, Australia, Germany and South Africa. In Australia, "Electric" spent two weeks in the Top 100, but failed to reach the Top 40. She went to South Africa and Germany to promote the single and released "Boy on the Dancefloor", a song from her then-unreleased album, on her website as a Christmas gift to her fans in 2005.

On 1 October 2006 it was announced that Scott-Lee would "film a great new TV show for mainstream TV" on her official website. It later emerged that the TV show in question was the second series of ITV's Dancing on Ice, although this was not officially confirmed until late December 2006. Her participation in Dancing On Ice began on 20 January 2007. On 24 February 2007 she lost in the dance off, finishing in 6th place. Scott-Lee's association with Dancing On Ice continued between March and May 2007 when she took part in Dancing on Ice: The Tour which toured across the UK.

Scott-Lee's first full-length solo album was Never or Now. The UK digital release date was supposed to be 26 March, presumably to capitalise on her success in Dancing on Ice. However, following her defeat in the sixth episode, the debut album was delayed again. It was released in South Africa by Sheer Music on 26 March 2007 and in the UK as a music download on 18 June 2007. A CD version was also released in Belgium and the Netherlands. On 16 July, the album had an import release and was confirmed by Play.com and Amazon.co.uk. Scott-Lee appeared in the 2007 Christmas special of the Ricky Gervais comedy Extras. She appeared in the Derby pantomime as 'Jack's wife' alongside her husband Johnny Shentall who played 'A Beanstalk' in 2007–08. In September 2008, Scott-Lee was a contestant on ITV2's flight attendant-based reality series CelebAir alongside husband Johnny. On 2 October 2008. the pair were eliminated from the show in the fifth week, after abandoning their cabin crew duties to party for two hours at Eden.

=== 2011–2022: Steps reformation ===
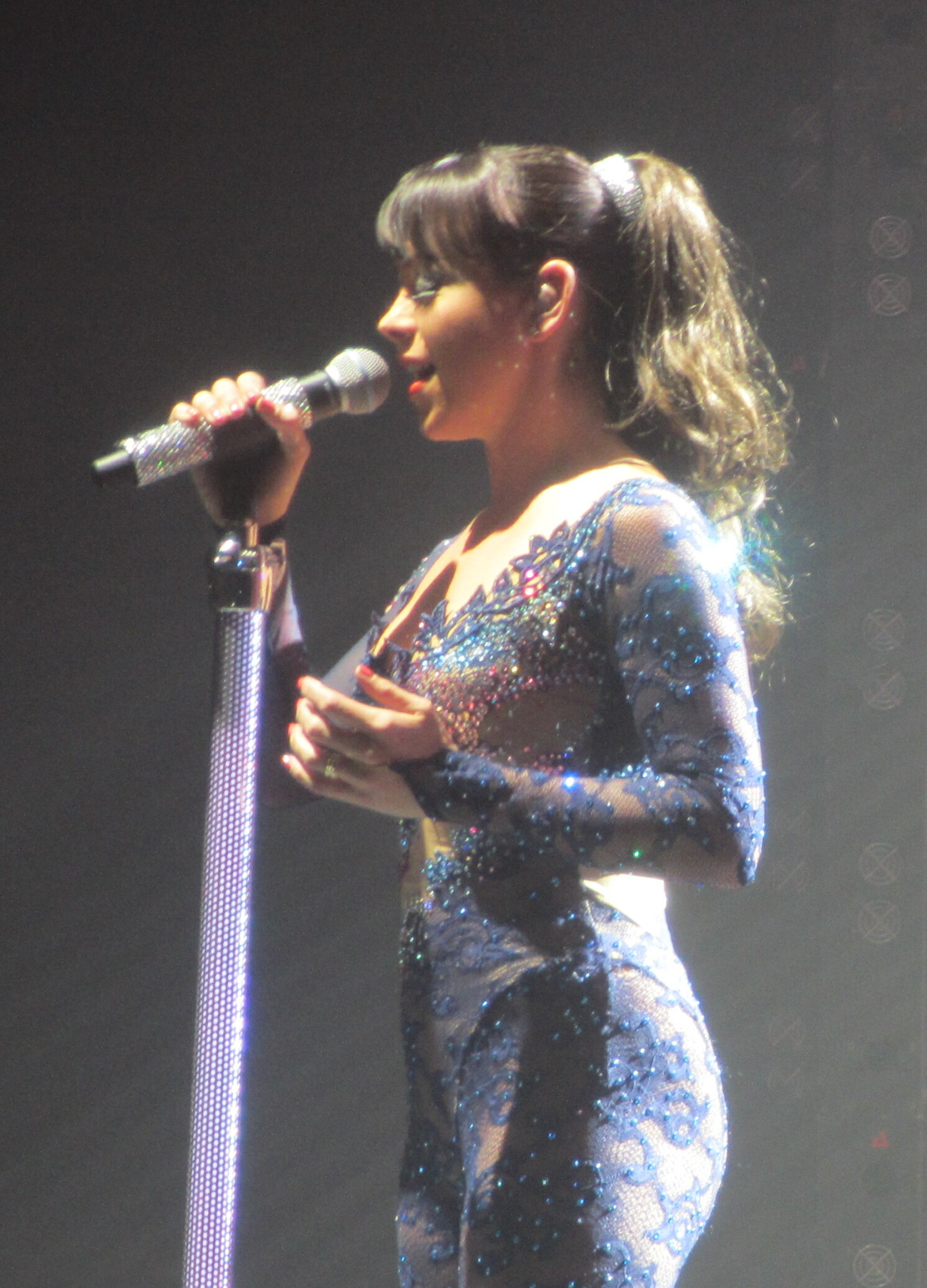
Scott-Lee performs during the Steps Ultimate Tour in 2012

Steps reformed in May 2011 for a four-part documentary series on Sky Living titled Steps: Reunion. The series started airing on 28 September, following an announcement of a second greatest hits album, The Ultimate Collection, that was released on 10 October 2011. The album entered the charts at number one, becoming the band's third album to achieve this feat. The second series of Steps: Reunion titled "Steps: On the Road Again" aired on Sky Living in April 2012; the series followed the band as they embarked on their sellout 22-date UK tour. On 24 September 2012, the group confirmed they would release their fourth studio album Light Up The World on 12 November 2012, alongside a six-date Christmas tour, starting from 30 November and ending on 5 December. The group reformed for a second time on 1 January 2017 in celebration of their 20th anniversary, and later announced their fifth studio album Tears on the Dancefloor, which was released in April 2017 and entered the charts at number 2. On 5 March 2017, the group confirmed the release of the new album, alongside its lead single, "Scared of the Dark", and a 22-date tour, Party on the Dancefloor. A deluxe edition of the album, titled Tears on the Dancefloor: Crying at the Disco, was released on 27 October.

In November 2017, Faye Tozer announced that the reunion was no longer just a 20th-anniversary celebration and that the group intends to continue after their 2018 Summer of Steps tour. In April 2018, Richards announced that following their summer tour, they would begin work on their sixth studio album. In February 2019, Richards announced the group would begin recording their next album during the summer months.

On 7 September 2020, via their social media accounts, Steps announced the release date of their album entitled What the Future Holds. The album was released on 27 November of the same year, with pre-orders available from 8 September. The next day, they confirmed a new 14-date UK tour (with special guest Sophie Ellis-Bextor) starting in November 2021. The first single from the album was the Greg Kurstin-and-Sia-penned "What the Future Holds", released on 9 September 2020. It was followed by "Something in Your Eyes" on 27 October 2020. "To the Beat of My Heart" was released as the album's third single in January 2021.

The first single of What the Future Holds Pt. 2 was confirmed as a reworked version of "Heartbreak in This City" featuring Michelle Visage.

=== 2023: Never or Now 20th anniversary ===
On 27 February 2023, Scott-Lee announced an expanded deluxe version of the Never or Now studio album would be released, in celebration of twenty years since the release of her debut solo single, "Lately". She also performed a solo show at the Mighty Hoopla festival on 4 June 2023 as part of the celebrations. Never or Now debuted at number 24 on the UK Album Downloads Chart on 20 October 2023. On the Scottish Album Chart, the album debuted at number 39.

== Personal life ==
Scott-Lee became engaged to former Steps dancer and Hear'Say singer, Johnny Shentall in April 2001 and they married on 14 August 2004. They have two children. The family moved to Dubai in 2011, and in 2014 Scott-Lee and Shentall founded a performing arts school there, the Dubai Academy of Performing Arts.

== Discography ==
=== Studio albums ===
Title	Details
Never or Now	Released: 3 May 2007; Label: Concept Music; Format: CD, digital download

=== Singles ===
==== As lead artist ====
List of singles, with selected chart positions
Title	Year	Peak chart positions						Album
Title	Year	UK	AUS	IRE	NL	SCO	SWI	Album
"Lately"	2003	6	—	24	35	8	52	Never or Now
"Too Far Gone"	2003	11	—	39	—	11	—	Never or Now
"Electric"	2005	13	60	—	—	13	—	Never or Now
"—" denotes releases that did not chart or were not released in that territory.

==== As featured artist ====
List of singles, with selected chart positions
Title	Year	Peak chart positions							Album
Title	Year	UK	UK Dance	AUS	FRA	ROM	SCO	US Dance	Album
"Get It On" (Intenso Project featuring Lisa Scott-Lee)	2004	23	27	56	38	69	26	15	non-album single
"—" denotes releases that did not chart or were not released in that territory.
