= Worlds Apart (band) =

English multinational boy band

- Origin: London, England
- Genres: Pop, dance, Europop
- Years active: 1992–2002, 2007–present
- Members: Steve Hart 1992–present Cal Cooper 1993–present Nathan Moore 1994–present
- Past members: Tim Fornara 1997–2001; Schelim Hannan 1992–1997; Aaron Paul 1992–1994; Dan Bowyer 1992–1994; Marcus Patrick as Patric Osborne 1992–1993; Video models: Matt Gray; Dan Bowyer; Anabel Evans

Worlds Apart are an English multinational boy band active in the 1990s, known for its frequently changing lineup. The original five-member group included Marcus Patrick (billed as Patric Osborne) and, from 1994 onwards, Nathan Moore from Brother Beyond. The band achieved several commercial hits in the United Kingdom and later re-emerged as a four-piece, becoming chart-toppers in France. Currently, the band is a trio, with Steve Hart being the only original and continuous member.

== Discography ==
=== Albums ===
Year	Album	UK	FR	BE	DE	AT	CH	Sales
1994	Together	89	46	–	84	–	–	
1996	Everybody	–	1	15	26	18	11	France: Diamond (1.5 million)
1997	Don't Change	–	3	21	45	47	18	France: Platinum (300,000)
2000	Here and Now	–	22	–	–	–	–	
2007	Platinum	–	–	–	–	–		

=== Singles ===
Year	Single	Peak chart positions										Album
Year	Single	UK	IE	NL	BE (VL)	BE (WA)	FR	DE	AT	CH	SE	Album
1993	"Heaven Must Be Missing an Angel" (UK only)	29	–	–	–	–	–	–	–	–	–	Together
1993	"Wonderful World" (UK only)	51	–	–	–	–	–	–	–	–	–	Together
1993	"Everlasting Love" (UK only)	20	23	–	–	–	–	–	–	–	–	Together
1994	"Could It Be I'm Falling in Love" (UK/GER/JPN)	15	–	–	–	–	–	56	–	–	–	Together
1994	"Beggin' to Be Written" (UK/GER)	29	–	–	–	–	–	–	–	–	–	Together
1994	"Everlasting Love" (GER only)	–	–	–	–	–	–	40	–	–	–	Together
1995	"Baby Come Back"	–	–	–	–	–	3	18	27	5	–	Everybody
1995	"When It's Christmas Time" (GER only)	–	–	–	–	–	–	38	–	14	–	Singles only
1996	"Love Message"	–	–	–	–	–	–	4	12	12	–	Singles only
1996	"Everybody"	–	–	–	–	–	8	22	21	17	–	Everybody
1996	"Je te donne"	–	–	–	35	3	3	22	16	16	16	Everybody
1996	"Just Say I Said Hello"	–	–	–	–	–	20	63	35	–	–	Everybody
1996	"Everlasting Love" (Continental Europe only)	–	–	–	33	29	4	–	–	–	–	Everybody
1996	"Together"	–	–	–	–	–	–	–	–	–	–	Everybody
1996	"I Was Born to Love You"	–	–	–	–	–	–	71	–	–	–	Queen Dance Traxx I
1997	"You Said (Remix '97)"	–	–	–	18	–	20	–	–	–	–	Single only
1997	"Rise Like the Sun" (GER only)	–	–	–	–	–	–	–	–	–	–	Don't Change
1997	"Quand je rêve de toi / I'm Dreaming of You"	–	–	–	9	11	3	–	–	–	–	Don't Change
1997	"She Loves You (Sie Liebt Dich)"	–	–	–	–	–	–	75	–	–	–	Don't Change
1997	"Don't Change"	–	–	–	20	23	16	–	–	–	–	Don't Change
1997	"Back to Where We Started"	–	–	92	3	–	51	78	–	–	–	Don't Change
1997	"Je serai là"	–	–	–	–	22	14	–	–	–	–	Singles only
1998	"Close Your Eyes"	–	–	–	49	26	34	–	–	–	–	Singles only
2000	"I Will"	–	–	–	–	5	37	–	–	–	–	Here and Now
2000	"Language of Love"	–	–	–	–	–	–	75	–	–	–	Here and Now
2007	"On écrit sur les murs"	–	–	–	–	–	–	–	–	–	–	Platinum
"—" denotes releases that did not chart or were not released.

=== French singles ===
- "Everybody" – Silver (125,000)
- "Baby Come Back" – Gold (500,000)
- "Je te donne" – Platinum (750,000)
- "Don't Change" – Silver
- "Quand je rêve de toi" – Gold
- "Everlasting Love" – Gold
- "Je serai là" – Silver
