= Steve Alexander (drummer) =

- Birth name: Steven Alexander
- Born: 20 November 1962 (age 62); Penrhos, Wales
- Occupation: Musician
- Instrument: Drums
- Years active: 1980–present
- Formerly of: Shook Up!, Brother Beyond

Steve Alexander (born 20 November 1962) is a Welsh drummer. Starting out with the Irish band Shook Up!, he earned a living as a session drummer, working regularly in London's recording studios on film, TV and commercial sessions and playing with the BBC Radio Orchestra. He became a permanent member of Brother Beyond following the departure of Eg White in 1986.

== Biography ==
In 1995, Alexander was hired by Duran Duran and continued to work with them for 6 years following the departure of their previous drummers Roger Taylor, Steve Ferrone, Terry Bozzio and Vinnie Colaiuta. During these years he contributed to the Thank You, Medazzaland and Pop Trash albums, also working with Melle Mel and Grandmaster Flash on the track "White Lines" which led to live work with these founders of rap.

Alexander resumed his freelance career, working with a wide variety of artists from Jeff Lorber, Warren Cuccurullo, Boy George and recording the award winning Voyegeur album with Zaire's Papa Wemba. in 1997 he ventured into drum and bass with solo releases on Cavendish Music and Reinforced Records. In 1998, Alexander started working with Jeff Beck, recording the Who Else album and toured for 18 months in the USA, Japan, South America and Europe. He also continued recording for his solo Flashman projects.

In May 2011, a film called Killing Bono saw a major cinematic release, based around the story of Alexander's first band and their rivalry with U2. It featured archive footage of Shook Up! performing live in Ireland, and Alexander was invited to attend the London premiere.

As of June 2011, Alexander has played with The Fabulous Lampshades, who regularly perform charity gigs in London in aid of the Teenage Cancer Trust. Since 2012 he has taught on the Music and Sound Design BA (Hons) degree course at Ravensbourne University London.
