= Big Star Records =

- Type: Music retailer
- Industry: Retail
- Founded: 1980s
- Headquarters: Norwood, South Australia, Australia
- Products: LPs, CDs, magazines, EPs and singles.

Big Star Records is a music retailer that was based in Adelaide, South Australia. It currently has the original store on Magill Rd, Norwood, South Australia.

From the 1980s until March 2010, Big Star Records also operated a retail store on Rundle Street, which closed when sales dropped due to competition from online music purchases.

== History ==
Big Star was founded in 1988 by Andy Geue, and began as a second hand shop on Magill Road in Norwood, South Australia. .

At its height, Big Star had six outlets in Adelaide, including the central store in Rundle Street in the East End and a store at 207b Sturt Road across from Westfield Marion. The Rundle Street store hosted free gigs in the basement every Wednesday evening, and many in-store appearances by bands such as Blink-182, Regurgitator and They Might Be Giants.
