= Neve (British band) =

British band

- Origin: United Kingdom
- Labels: Nebula Records
- Past members: Angela John; Daniel Sherman; Paul Newton

Neve are a British band consisting of Angela John, Daniel Sherman and Paul Newton. They are notable for releasing a vocal version of Y-Traxx's song "Mystery Land" to which they added additional lyrics. It reached No. 70 in UK Singles Chart in 2003.
