= Nathan Moore (English musician) =

- Born: Nathan Marcellus Moore; 10 January 1965 (age 61)
- Origin: Stamford Hill, London, England
- Genres: Pop, soul, synth-pop, dance
- Occupations: Singer, talent manager
- Instrument: Vocals
- Years active: 1986–present
- Label: EMI
- Website: www.nathanmooreofficial.co.uk

Nathan Marcellus Moore (born 10 January 1965 in Hackney, London, England) is a British singer and former talent manager.

== Career ==
Moore joined the boyband Brother Beyond as their lead singer in 1986, when the band and their record label won an auction to record a track with the 1980s record producers Stock, Aitken and Waterman), Moore was subsequently in the line-up of another boyband, Worlds Apart, that had chart success in France.

After leaving the group, Moore moved into music management, representing a number of Pop Idol contestants, such as Hayley Evetts.

In the late 1990s Moore recorded a duet with the English popstar Kim Wilde called "If There Was Love". The duet was never commercially released, but Moore gave it away as a free download on his website in 2001.

In the 2000s, he appeared as a reality television contestant, on music revival programme Hit Me Baby One More Time, and as Lisa Scott-Lee's manager on the MTV Europe programme Totally Scott-Lee.

In April and May 2006, Moore appeared as the band manager in the E4/Channel 4 television programme, Boys Will Be Girls. On 18 July 2006, Moore issued a statement, via his website, announcing that he had stopped managing acts.

Moore continues to tour as a solo artist, occasionally with Brother Beyond, and more recently alongside Worlds Apart. On 7 February 2015 Moore appeared on BBC1's talent show The Voice but did not make it through to the second round.

== See also ==
- David White
- James Fox
