= Elliott Brothers =

Elliott Brothers may refer to:

- Elliott Brothers (computer company), an early British computer company
- Elliott Brothers (builders merchant), a builders' merchant in Southampton, England
