= River Medway (drag queen) =

British drag queen

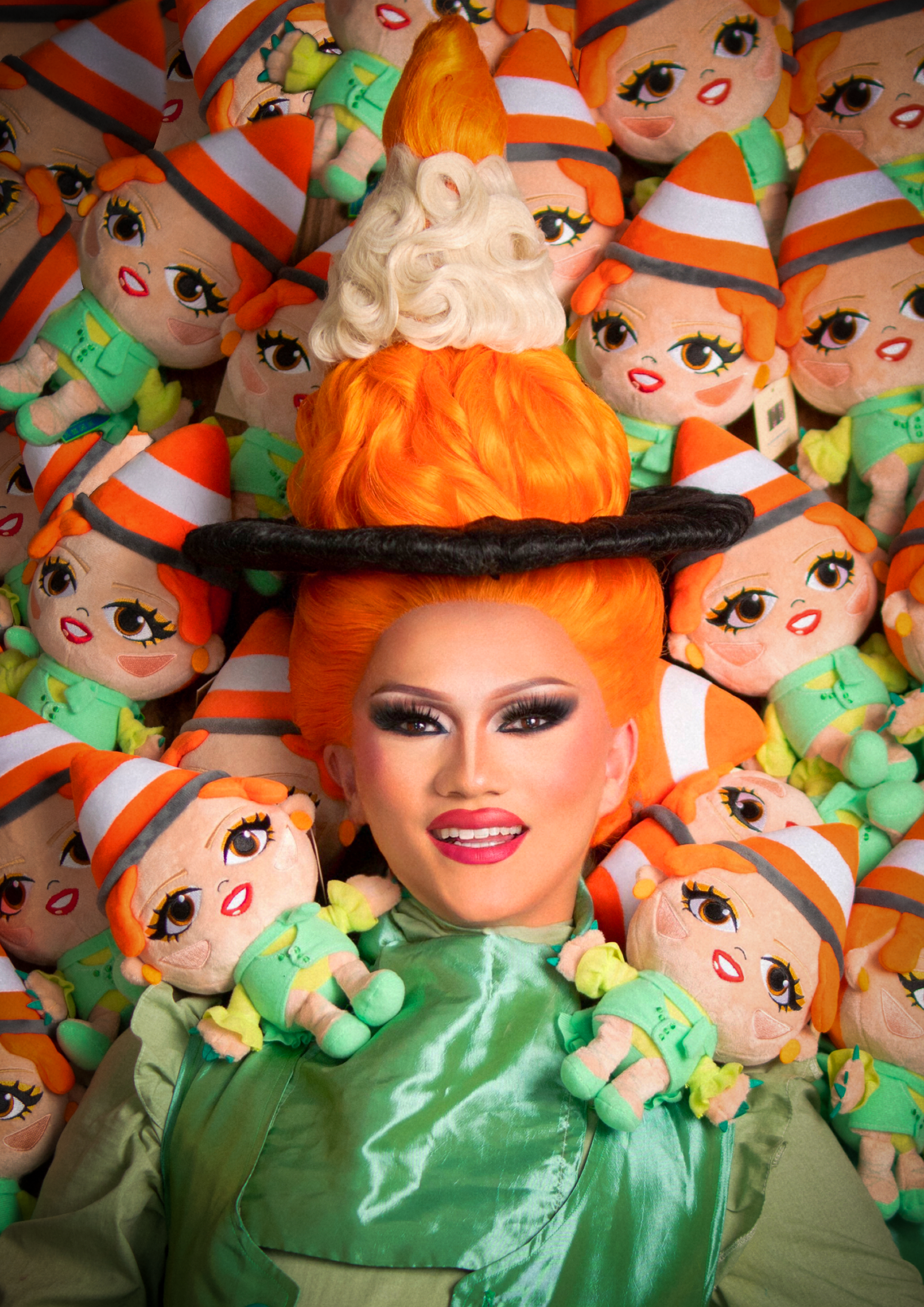
- Born: Dexter Clift; 8 April 1998 (age 28); Medway, Kent, England
- Education: Millennium Performing Arts
- Occupation: Drag queen
- Television: RuPaul's Drag Race UK (series 3)
- Website: river-medway.com

Dexter Clift (born 8 April 1998), known professionally as River Medway, is an English drag queen and musical theatre performer who is best known for competing on the third series of RuPaul's Drag Race UK in 2021.

== Career ==
In 2021, River Medway was announced as one of the drag queens competing in the third series of RuPaul's Drag Race UK. During her time on the show, River Medway's runway look inspired by Thomas Fletcher Waghorn gained comedy attention on social media. She also discussed her mother dying from COVID-19, and revealed that she received a call for the show not long after her death. River Medway was eliminated from the competition following the Snatch Game episode, alongside Choriza May after a lip sync to "Shout" resulted in RuPaul deciding to eliminate both of them in a double elimination.

In 2022, River Medway embarked on the RuPaul's Drag Race UK: The Official Tour alongside her fellow cast members. Later that year, River Medway joined the cast of the show Death Drop: Back in the Habit, alongside Drag Race alumni Victoria Scone, Willam Belli, and Cheryl Hole. The show played at the Garrick Theatre followed by a UK Tour in 2023. In October 2023, it was announced River Medway had been cast as Ariel in the parody musical Unfortunate: The Untold Story of Ursula the Sea Witch. The show played for 10 weeks at Southwark Playhouse and embarked on a UK tour to 20 cities in 2024. River appears on the Original Studio Cast Recording.

In July 2024 River Medway was announced as the Mistress of Ceremonies in House of Cleopatra, which played at Edinburgh Festival Fringe in August. Shortly after, River Medway was cast as Jem in the jukebox musical Here & Now: The Steps Musical which played at the The Alexandra, Birmingham later that year. In 2025 the cast made television appearances alongside pop group Steps on Britain's Got Talent and National Lottery's Big Night of Musicals . Following this, the show embarked on a UK and Ireland tour which concluded in May 2026. The show received a nomination for Best New Musical at the 2026 WhatsOnStage Awards.

== Personal life ==
Dexter Clift was born in Medway, Kent to an English mother and a Singaporean Chinese father. The name of his drag persona comes from the River Medway that flows through his hometown.

On July 25th 2024, Dexter was awarded with an Honorary Doctor of Arts (HonDArts) by the University of Greenwich recognising his outstanding commitment to the Medway area and exceptional representation of the LGBT+ community (as River Medway).

== Discography ==
=== Singles ===
==== As featured artist ====
- Feeling Fruity (Choriza May feat. River Medway) (2022)

=== Cast Recordings ===
Year	Title	Notes
2024	Unfortunate: The Untold Story of Ursula the Sea Witch (Original Studio Cast Recording)	Wildpark Entertainment; Formats: Digital download, streaming

== Filmography ==
=== Television ===
Year	Title	Notes	Ref
2021	RuPaul's Drag Race UK	Contestant Series 3 (6th/7th place)	

=== Stage ===
Year	Title	Promoter	Locations	Ref
2022	RuPaul's Drag Race UK: The Official Tour	Voss Events / World of Wonder	Ipswich, Oxford, Edinburgh, Glasgow, Newcastle, Nottingham, Bournemouth, Southend, Manchester, Sheffield, Blackpool, Llandudno, Birmingham, Cardiff, Liverpool, Basingstoke, Portsmouth, Plymouth, London, Derby, Bristol, Bradford, Aberdeen, Southampton, Stockton, Brighton and Newport	
2022	Death Drop: Back in the Habit	Trafalgar Entertainment/TuckShop	Garrick Theatre	
2022-23	Death Drop: Back in the Habit [UK TOUR]	Trafalgar Entertainment/TuckShop	Bromley, Dartford, High Wycombe, Cardiff, Crewe, Brighton, Sheffield, Leicester and Aberdeen	
2023	Unfortunate: The Untold Story of Ursula the Sea Witch	Wildpark Entertainment	Southwark Playhouse - London	
2024	Unfortunate: The Untold Story of Ursula the Sea Witch [UK TOUR]	Wildpark Entertainment	Salford, Liverpool, Aberdeen, Crawley, Bradford, Leicester, Birmingham, Peterborough, Oxford, Glasgow, Cardiff, Blackpool, Southend-on-Sea, Exeter, York, Bromley, Nottingham, Newcastle upon Tyne, Southampton and Wolverhampton	
2024	House of Cleopatra [Edinburgh Fringe]	Alchemation / Nathaniel Hill	Edinburgh Festival Fringe	
2024-26	Here & Now (as Jem)	Steps / ROYO / Pete Waterman	The Alexandra, Birmingham, UK and Ireland tour	
