= Shaun Kitchener =

British writer

Shaun Kitchener is an English stage and screenwriter, and journalist.

== Career ==
Kitchener studied English literature and drama at The University of East Anglia, before completing the young writers' programme at the Royal Court Theatre. In 2015, his debut full-length play Positive - in which he also performed - was staged at Park Theatre, London, after earlier versions were self-produced for the Edinburgh Festival Fringe and London's Waterloo East Theatre. For the latter production, he was nominated for Most Promising New Playwright at The Offies.

In 2016, one of his spec scripts was a winner of the BAFTA Rocliffe prize for TV Comedy, and in 2017 he joined the writing team of Channel 4 soap opera Hollyoaks. He has written over 60 episodes as of 2024.

In 2018, his play All That was produced at the King's Head Theatre, London, and in 2021 it was revived as the same theatre's Queer Season headliner. For the latter production, Kitchener received an Offies nomination for Best New Play, but the final week of performances was cancelled due to a cast member testing positive for COVID-19. Sister Dating Swap, a television film he wrote for Reel One Entertainment, was released to Amazon Freevee in 2024. In March 2024, his debut short film Toothbrush, which he wrote and directed, had its world premiere at BFI Flare. It was nominated for Best Drama Short at New York CineFest in April 2025.

In January 2024, he was announced as the writer of Here & Now, the official jukebox musical for the British pop group Steps. The show had its world premiere at Birmingham's The Alexandra in November 2024, and began a 29-venue UK and Ireland tour in August 2025, scheduled to run until May 2026. It received positive reviews, and was nominated for Best New Musical at the WhatsOnStage Awards.

As an entertainment journalist and columnist, Kitchener has written for outlets including Metro, PinkNews, Daily Mirror and Attitude.
