= Dan Partridge =

English actor

- Born: Daniel Alexander Partridge; 15 March 1993 (age 33); Poole, England
- Education: ArtsEd
- Years active: 2015–present

Daniel Alexander Partridge (born 1993) is an English actor. He is known for his work in musical theatre.

== Early life ==
Partridge was born in Poole, Dorset and attended Poole Grammar School. He had his first acting experience aged 12 in a school production of Grease, which he would later star in professionally as an adult. He took classes at the Big Little Theatre School in Bournemouth. Partridge went on to train at the Arts Educational School (ArtsEd), graduating in 2014 with a Bachelor of Arts (BA) in Musical Theatre.

== Career ==
In 2015, Partridge made his West End debut when he joined the cast of Mamma Mia at the Novello Theatre as Pepper. This was followed by roles in Sleeping Beauty at the Richmond Theatre in 2016 and Starlight Express in Bochum in 2017.

Partridge went on the UK tour of Hairspray as Link Larkin, taking over the role from Edward Chitticks, and the international tour of Cats as Rum Tum Tugger in 2018 and 2019. He was subsequently cast as Danny Zuko on the UK and Ireland tour of Grease, which resumed in 2021. Partridge would reprise his role as Danny Zuko in the 2022 West End revival of Grease at the Dominion Theatre opposite Olivia Moore as Sandy, and reprise it again in 2023. The cast put on a performance at the 2023 Laurence Olivier Awards. After exiting Grease, Partridge played Magaldi in Evita at the Curve in Leicester.

Also in 2023, Partridge made his television debut with guest appearances in episodes of the BBC One medical soap operas Doctors and Casualty. Later that year, he portrayed Randy Scott in the ITV biographical miniseries Archie.

Throughout 2025, Partridge has starred as Charlie in Kinky Boots with Johannes Radebe and Courtney Bowman, in the UK and Ireland. In the interim, Partridge originated the role of Ben in the Steps jukebox musical Here & Now at the Alexandra in Birmingham. Partridge will be playing the role of Dr. Jim Pomatter in the 2026 UK tour of Waitress.

== Filmography ==
Year	Title	Role	Notes
2017	Été	Rhys	Short film
2023	Doctors	Jez Gordon	Episode: "Crash and Burn"
2024	Casualty	Jamie Welles	Episode: "Too Young, Too Soon"
2023	Archie	Randy Scott	Miniseries, 1 episode
2025	Father Brown	Ron White	Episode: "The Lord of the Dance"

== Stage ==
Year	Title	Role	Notes
2015	Mamma Mia	Pepper	Novello Theatre, London
2016	Sleeping Beauty	Prince Antonio	Richmond Theatre
2017	Starlight Express	Cover Rusty and Electra	Starlight Express Theatre, Bochum
2018	Hairspray	Link Larkin	UK tour
2019	Cats	Rum Tum Tugger	International tour
2019, 2021	Grease	Danny Zuko	UK and Ireland tour
2022–2023	Grease	Danny Zuko	Dominion Theatre, London
2023	Evita	Magaldi	Curve Theatre, Leicester
2024	Here & Now	Ben	The Alexandra, Birmingham
2025	Kinky Boots	Charlie Price	UK and Ireland tour
2026	Waitress	Dr. Jim Pomatter	UK and Ireland tour
