= Bishop's Waltham Palace =

Palace ruins in England

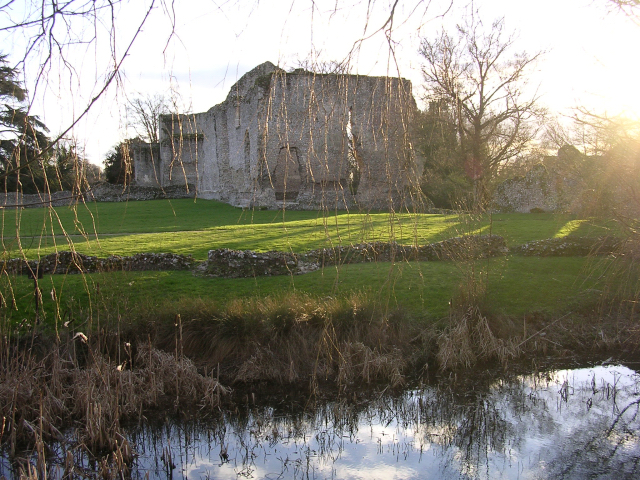
- The palace and moat in winter

- Location within Hampshire
- 50°57′13″N 1°12′56″W
- Type: Medieval palace
- Location: Bishops Waltham
- OS grid reference: SU 55142 17271

Site notes
- Area: Hampshire
- Owner: English Heritage

Scheduled monument
- Official name: Bishop's Waltham Palace and associated fishponds
- Designated: 28 November 1934
- Reference no.: 1016169

Listed Building – Grade II*
- Official name: Palace House, Bishops Waltham
- Designated: 5 March 1967
- Reference no.: 1350587

Bishop's Waltham Palace is a moated Bishop's Palace ruin in Bishop's Waltham, Hampshire, England. It is a scheduled ancient monument and a Grade II* listed building

== History ==
The bishops of Winchester held lands in Waltham from Saxon times, having acquired it from King Edward the Elder in 904 in exchange for lands at Portchester. The remains of timber buildings have been found at the site which may have formed the early residence. Domesday Book records that the bishop had a park for wild animals here in 1086.

The first stone building was built by Henry de Blois in 1135. Little remains of this palace, apart from part of the undercroft as it was probably slighted, along with Henry de Blois' other palaces after Henry II came to the throne. The bishop having supported his brother, King Stephen in the civil war with Matilda. After Henry de Blois returned from exile in 1158 the palace was rebuilt, probably with further development under his successor, Richard of Ilchester. In the late 13th and 14th centuries, it was regularly used by the Bishops of Winchester as they travelled, along with Farnham Castle and Wolvesey Castle. Henry III also stayed there a number of times. Richard I held a council here in 1194 before his last expedition to France.

Between 1378 and 1401 the palace was largely rebuilt by Bishop William of Wykeham. Further additions were made by his successor Cardinal Beaufort. The final phase of work was carried out by Bishop Langton from 1495.

The palace was popular with Royalty, visited by Henry V, and used by Mary Tudor just prior to her marriage to Philip II at Winchester Cathedral. Henry VIII met Emperor Charles V at the palace in 1522 to negotiate the Treaty of Waltham.

The palace was destroyed in 1644 after the English Civil War, having been held for the King. After the Restoration in 1660, ownership of the ruins was returned to the bishops.

In 1869 the Ecclesiastical Commissioners took over the site, and in 1889 it was sold to Sir William Jenner. The last owner, Viscount Cunningham, passed the ruins into the guardianship of the Office of Works in 1952. They are now looked after by English Heritage.

== Public Access ==
The palace is open to the public and is often used for local events such as the Bishop's Waltham Festival.
