= Here & Now (musical) =

2024 jukebox musical based on the songs of Steps

- The Steps Musical
- Original production poster
- Music: Various
- Lyrics: Various
- Book: Shaun Kitchener
- Basis: The songs of Steps
- Premiere: 9 November 2024: The Alexandra, Birmingham
- Productions: 2024 Birmingham; 2025 UK and Ireland tour

Here & Now is a jukebox musical with a book by Shaun Kitchener based on the songs of the British pop group Steps. It premiered on 9 November 2024 and received a nomination for Best New Musical at the 2026 WhatsOnStage Awards.

== Production history ==
=== World premiere: Birmingham (2024) ===
On 26 January 2024, it was announced that the musical will have its world premiere at The Alexandra, Birmingham beginning previews on 9 November, with a gala night on 19 November (with Steps appearing and performing during the Finale Megamix), running until 30 November 2024, after being extended from 24 November due to popular demand. It became the venue's fastest-selling show in its history, with 50% of seats sold in the first 24 hours. The show is directed by Rachel Kavanaugh with Matt Cole handling choreography, Tom Rogers handling set design, Howard Hudson handling lighting design, Gabriella Slade handling costume design, Adam Fisher handling sound design, Will Burton handling casting, and Sam Cox handling wig, hair and makeup design. Musical supervision, orchestrations and arrangements are by Matt Spencer-Smith. It is produced by Steps, ROYO and Pete Waterman. Initial principle casting for the world premiere was announced on 18 July 2024, with the full cast revealed on 4 September 2024.

=== UK and Ireland tour (2025–2026) ===
During the finale of the Birmingham gala night, Steps announced that the musical will embark on a UK and Ireland tour beginning at the Aylesbury Waterside Theatre on 29 August 2025, before an official opening at the Manchester Opera House, then the show went a UK which concluded at the Marlowe Theatre, Canterbury in May 2026. Initial principle casting for the tour was announced on 22 May 2025.

Steps promoted the tour with a live performance alongside the cast on Britain's Got Talent on May 24, 2025; and on Strictly Come Dancing from the Blackpool Tower Ballroom on November 22, 2025.

== Synopsis ==
At the seaside supermarket Better Best Bargains, employee Caz McGovern is elated that she and her husband Gareth have been approved to adopt a child. Her friends Vel, Neeta and Robbie are in awe at how her life is perfect, so - in lieu of a present for her upcoming 50th birthday - she challenges them to ‘take a chance on a happy ending’ for themselves and have the Summer of Love they've been dreaming of: Vel must end her loveless relationship, Neeta must confess her feelings to her workplace crush Ben, and Robbie must learn to give potential boyfriends a chance without finding tiny reasons to push them away. However, when Gareth tells Caz he is ending their marriage, meaning the adoption is ruined, her own 'happy ending' is in tatters and she must follow her own advice. When she puts her faith in the wrong person and jeopardises the entire store's future, the friends' Summer of Love is at risk of becoming a Tragedy.

== Musical numbers ==
As performed during the world premiere run in Birmingham:

Act I

- "Better Best Forgotten (Prologue)" - Caz
- "Stomp" - Caz, Vel, Robbie, Neeta, Ben, Tracey, Lesley, Patricia, ensemble
- "Summer of Love" - Caz, Vel, Robbie, Neeta
- "After the Love Has Gone" - Caz, Gareth
- "Last Thing on My Mind" - Vel, Lesley, ensemble
- "Neon Blue" - Vel, Neeta, Robbie, Caz, ensemble
- "5, 6, 7, 8" - Vel, Neeta, Ben, Robbie, Caz, ensemble
- "Say You'll Be Mine" - Robbie, Vel, Neeta, Caz, Ben, Jem, ensemble
- "Heartbeat" - Caz
- "Love's Got a Hold on My Heart" - Robbie, Caz, Neeta, Vel, Jem, ensemble
- "Scared of the Dark" - Caz, Vel, Neeta, ensemble
- "What the Future Holds" - Caz, Jem, Robbie, Neeta, Robbie, Vel, Gareth, Max, Patricia, ensemble

Act II

- "Tragedy" - Caz, Max, Robbie, Neeta, Vel, ensemble
- "Deeper Shade of Blue" - Robbie, Neeta, Caz, Vel
- "Something in Your Eyes" - Neeta, Ben
- "One for Sorrow" - Caz
- "Better the Devil You Know" - Caz, Gareth, ensemble
- "Story of a Heart" - Robbie, Jem
- "Chain Reaction" - Jem, ensemble
- "It's The Way You Make Me Feel" - Vel, Tracey
- "Better Best Forgotten" - Caz, Gareth, Robbie, Lesley, ensemble
- "Paradise Lost/Summer of Love (Reprise)" - Ben, Jem, ensemble
- "Here and Now" - Caz, Robbie, Neeta, Vel, ensemble
- "Better Best Forgotten (Reprise)" - Neeta, Vel, Robbie, Caz

Encore

- "Finale Megamix" (Note: Contains: "Stomp", "5,6,7,8", "Tragedy", "Better Best Forgotten", "Last Thing on My Mind", "Love's Got A Hold on My Heart", "What the Future Holds", "One for Sorrow", "Scared of the Dark" and "Neon Blue".) - Full company

== Cast and characters ==
Character	Birmingham	UK & Ireland Tour
Character	2024	2025-2026
Caz	Rebecca Lock	Rebecca Lock & Lara Denning (Note: Rebecca Lock played Caz up to and including 9 November 2025. Lara Denning performed the role thereafter.)
Vel	Sharlene Hector	Jacqui Dubois
Robbie	Blake Patrick Anderson	Blake Patrick Anderson
Neeta	Hiba Elchikhe	Rosie Singha
Ben	Dan Partridge	Ben Darcy
Jem	River Medway	River Medway
Patricia	Finty Williams	Finty Williams & Sally Ann Matthews (Note: Finty Williams played Patricia for the 2025 dates of the tour. Sally Ann Matthews took over in January 2026.)
Gareth	Gary Milner	Chris Grahamson
Tracey	Helen Colby	Lauren Woolf
Max	Edward Baker-Duly	Edward Baker-Duly
Lesley	John Stacey	John Stacey

== Critical reception ==
The November 2024 premiere run in Birmingham received critical acclaim. Awarding four stars out of five, Attitude critic Jamie Tabberer called it "utterly steptacular", praising its "pristine staging, an inspired story, emotional depth and songs reframed so as to be revelatory". The Stage writer Matthew Hemley also gave four stars, praising Rebecca Lock for "[bringing] the house down". In another four-star review, The Sun critic Howell Davies praised the "emotional storyline of love, loss and friendship", as well as the "fabulous and silly" tone. He added that "this has the potential to become the biggest jukebox hit since Mamma Mia!". In her four-star critique, Whatsonstage's Diane Parkes called it "foot kickin’, finger clickin’, leather slapping, hand clappin’". All That Dazzles editor Daz Gale gave a five-star review, saying: "This steptacular musical may well have broken my star system as I truly feel it deserves more than five stars - it deserves 5, 6, 7, 8 of them." The publication also listed the show as the second-best of 2024, behind only the London revival of Hello, Dolly!. The show also received five-star reviews from blogs including Theatre And Tonic, Black Country Radio, LondonTheatre1, Curtain Call Reviews, Brum Hour, Things We Enjoy, Fairy Powered Productions, and What's On.

For the launch of the UK and Ireland tour in September 2025, The Guardian awarded four stars out of five. Calling the show "endlessly entertaining", critic Michael Cragg said it "reminded me of Victoria Wood’s Dinnerladies, only spiked with the energy of a Zumba class". For the Sunday Express, Stefan Kyriazis gave four stars, calling the show "deliciously camp and sneakily moving... with lashings of banging banter and heartfelt sincerity". Gay Times critic Chris Selman also awarded four stars out of five, calling it "a fun, feel-good and fabulous night out".
