= Unfortunate: The Untold Story of Ursula The Sea Witch =

2019 revisionist parody musical

Unfortunate: The Untold Story of Ursula the Sea Witch
- Music: Tim Gilvin
- Lyrics: Robyn Grant; Daniel Foxx
- Book: Robyn Grant; Daniel Foxx
- Basis: Movie The Little Mermaid by: John Musker; Ron Clements; Musical The Little Mermaid Live!; Brian Strickland
- Premiere: 2019: Edinburgh Fringe
- Productions: 2019 Edinburgh; 2022 Edinburgh; 2023 London Run; 2024 UK Tour; 2025 Sweden; 2025 The Lowry; 2026 The Other Palace, London

Unfortunate: The Untold Story of Ursula The Sea Witch is a revisionist parody musical of Disney's The Little Mermaid. Ursula becomes the main character in the musical by Robyn Grant, Daniel Foxx and Tim Gilvin which was first performed in 2019 at the Edinburgh Fringe and subsequently toured the UK alongside three London runs.

== Production history ==
=== Edinburgh Fringe (2019) ===
The world premiere production of Unfortunate: The Untold Story of Ursula the Sea Witch took place at the Edinburgh Festival Fringe, as a presentation by Fat Rascal Theatre. The show had a sell out run from 31 July 2019 to 26 August 2019 at Underbelly, Bristo Square (Ermintrude).

=== Edinburgh Fringe (2022) ===
The musical ran again at the Edinburgh Festival Fringe, after being reworked, from 4 August 2022 until 29 August 2022 at Underbelly, George Square (Underbelly). This was a sell out run. The show then went onto perform at The Lowry, Birmingham Hippodrome and Sheffield Theatres.

=== London Run (2023–2024) ===
Before its UK Tour, Unfortunate: The Untold Story of Ursula the Sea Witch had a London Run staged at Southwark Playhouse Elephant from 8 December 2023 to 17 February 2024.

=== UK Tour (2024) ===
The Unfortunate: The Untold Story of Ursula the Sea Witch UK Tour Launched at The Lowry in Salford on 22 February 2024 and closed at the Wolverhampton Grand Theatre on 14 July 2024.

=== Nordic Premiere, Sweden (2025) ===
Unfortunate: The Untold Story of Ursula the Sea Witch debuted in Scandinavia in the Fall of 2025 at Östgötateatern In Norrköping and later on in Linköping.

The Lowry, Salford, UK

(2025)

== Original principal casts ==
| Role | Edinburgh Fringe | Edinburgh Fringe | London Run and UK Tour | The Lowry |
| Role | 2019 | 2022 | 2023–24 | 2025 |
| Ursula | Robyn Grant | Elliotte Williams-N'Dure | Shawna Hamic | Sam Buttery |
| Ariel | Katie Wells | Miracle Chance | River Medway | Miracle Chance |
| Triton | Steffan Rizzi | George Whitty | Thomas Lowe | Blair Robertson |
| Sebastian | Allie Munro | Allie Munro | Allie Dart (Allie Munro) | Allie Dart (Allie Munro) |
| Eric | Jamie Mawson | Jamie Mawson | Jamie Mawson | James Spence |
| Grimsby | | | Julian Capolei | |
| | Scuttle † | | Jack Gray | |
| | Ensemble | | Corrina Buchan, Jack Gray, Jamie Mckillop and Milly Willows | Freya McMahon and Fionán O’Carroll |

† Not credited in the Tour Cast as their own character but is still in the show and played by a member of the ensemble.

== Musical numbers ==
=== Act One ===
- "Nasty" Ursula and Company
- "The Atlantic Dream" †
- "Suckin' On You" – Ursula and Triton
- "The Banishment" – Triton, Poseidon, Ursula and Company
- "We Didn't Make It To Disney" – Company
- "Where the Dicks Are" – Ariel
- "An Adventure" – Company
- "Where The Dicks Are – Reprise" – Ariel, Eric and Grimsby
- "It Hurts, Huh?" – Ursula
- "Unfortunate" – Ursula and Company

=== Act Two ===
- "Scuttle's Shot †
- "Les Poissons" – Colette and Company
- "Unfortunate – Reprise" †
- "Ask The Girl" – Colette and Company
- "Female Role Models" – Ursula, Triton, Flotsam and Jetsam
- "To Be King" – Triton and Kirsty
- "Hot Girl Summer" – Vanessa, Eric and Company
- "Confrontation At Sea" – Company
- "Finale" – Company
- "I'm That Witch" – Company

=== Bonus Track ===
- "Another Day" – Sebastian, Ariel and Company

† Not included on studio cast recording

=== Cast recordings ===
==== Studio Cast Recording (2024) ====
The Original Studio Cast recording for Unfortunate: The Untold Story of Ursula the Sea Witch was released digitally by Wildpark Entertainment on 14 June 2024.

==== Le Petite Albume (2024) ====
Before a full album was released in June 2024, a mini album was released on 12 January 2024 by Wildpark Entertainment. It was called Unfortunate: The Untold Story of Ursula the Sea Witch – The Musical Parody – Le Petite Albume (Original Soundtrack) and featured 3 songs as a teaser and was used for promotion. The song on the album are "Suckin' on You", "Unfortunate" and "Ask the Girl". It is listed as an EP and not an Album, as the full cast recording is.

==== Fringe Cast Recording (2020) ====
On 9 April 2020 Fat Rascal Ltd released a Fringe cast recording featuring the 5 songs: "Nasty", "we Didn't Make It to Disney", "Unfortunate", "Female Role Models" and "To Be King". This EP is no longer publicly available to listen to.
