= Bishop's Waltham =

Town in Hampshire, England

Coordinates: 50°57′13″N 1°12′42″W

- Market town
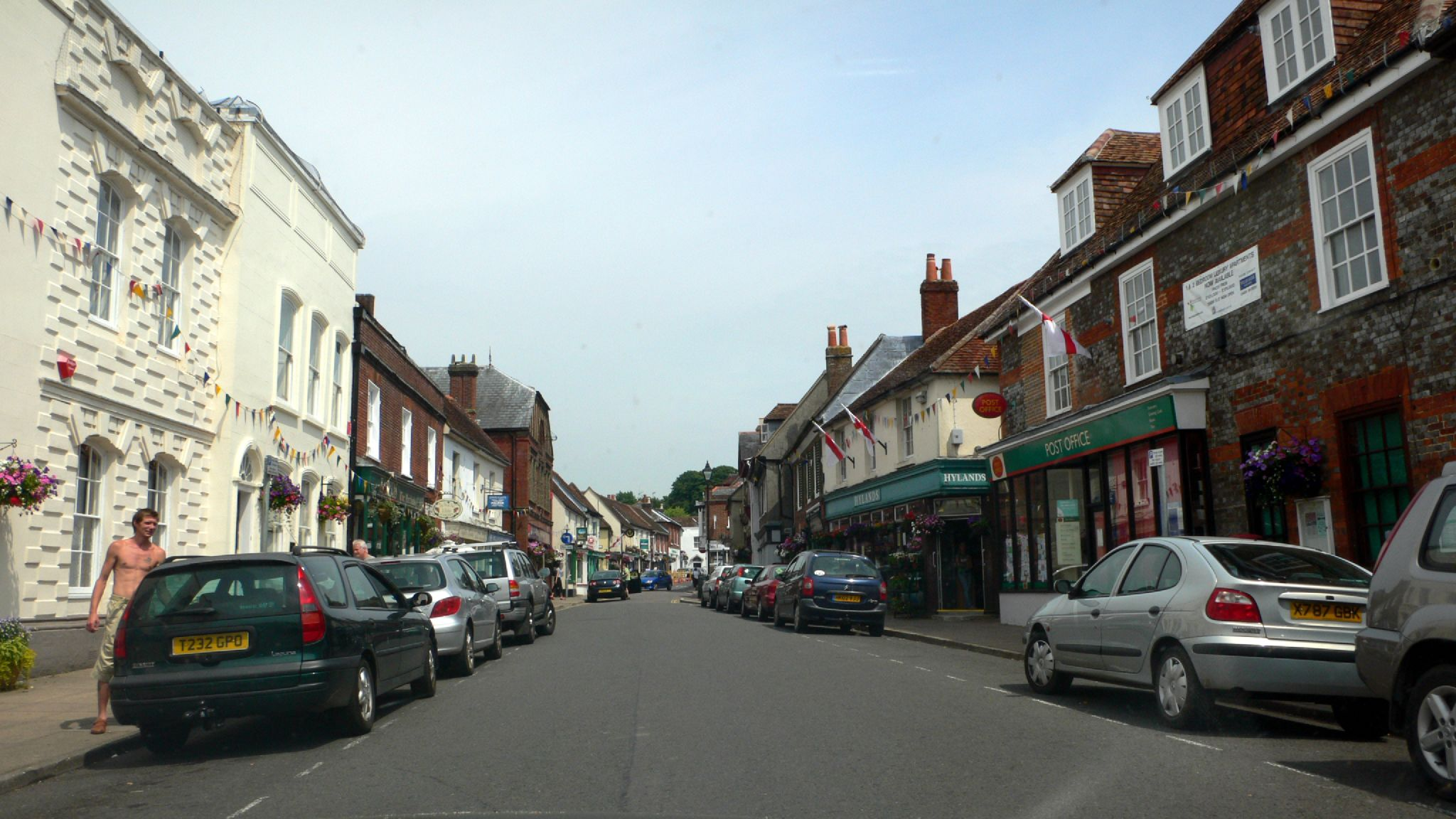
- Bishop's Waltham High Street

- Location within Hampshire
- Population: 6,723 (2011 Census)
- OS grid reference: SU554174
- District: City of Winchester
- Shire county: Hampshire
- Region: South East
- Country: England
- Sovereign state: United Kingdom
- Post town: Southampton
- Postcode district: SO32
- Dialling code: 01489
- Police: Hampshire and Isle of Wight
- Fire: Hampshire and Isle of Wight
- Ambulance: South Central
- UK Parliament: Winchester

Bishop's Waltham (or Bishops Waltham) is a medieval market town situated at the source of the River Hamble in Hampshire, England. It has a foot in the South Downs National Park and is located at the midpoint of a long-established route between Winchester and Portsmouth. It is home to the ruins of Bishop's Waltham Palace, a Scheduled Ancient Monument under English Heritage management, and a well-preserved high street with many listed buildings which now house independent shops.

Bishop's Waltham's long history includes a roll call of Medieval and Tudor kings and queens who visited the town to stay at the palace. The name of the town is derived from the Anglo-Saxon words: "wald" (forest) and "ham" (settlement).

Modern day Bishop's Waltham has a population of over 6,723 and is the largest settlement in the Winchester district outside the city itself. It is home to an infant and junior school.

== History ==
The town's name comprises three parts 'walt' – forest; 'ham' – settlement'; and 'Bishop's'. It started off as a very early Anglo-Saxon settlement between 450 and 550 AD, and steadily grew to become one of Hampshire's largest villages, despite being burnt to the ground by Danes in 1001 AD. By the time of the Domesday Book (1086), it had a population of around 600 living in 115 households - at the time, the 11th largest settlement in Hampshire. In 904, King Edward the Elder (King Alfred's son) exchanged it with Denewulf, Bishop of Winchester, for the Bishop's estate at Portchester. In 1136 Henry de Blois, a later bishop, built a new church and in 1158 started the now-ruined Bishop's Waltham Palace. It was destroyed on the orders of Oliver Cromwell during the English Civil War. Much of the old Palace is still in the town. Apart from the ruins, which are open to the public, material from the Palace was used as building materials in town buildings still standing to this day.

William of Wykeham died in the town, while after the Battle of Trafalgar, some 200 French officers including Admiral Villeneuve were imprisoned there.

There are many Georgian buildings in the town alongside the Norman parish church. The town retains a unique character, with a number of small local businesses (such as a butchers, bakery and fishmonger) including an off-licence which was established in 1617 and closed in 2011 (Bakers Wine Merchants). The High Street in the town also has to a number of chain stores (such as Co-op) and a large supermarket chain (Sainsbury's); the owners of the independent shops have fought to prevent larger chains from threatening their businesses and, they argue, the character of the town. Unusually for the United Kingdom, there is a vineyard nearby.

During the 19th century, Bishop's Waltham was a successful market town, being home to several agricultural suppliers, merchants and a cattle market. The town also had a large brickworks to its north, along with a gasworks that provided town gas for lighting and heating the town. The town had a large enough working population by the late 19th century to support a Working Men's Institute, which occupied an ornate brick building on Bank Street, which remained open until 2003, when it was converted into housing. Bishop's Waltham was home to Gunner and Company, which was the last provincial private bank in the United Kingdom.

The brickworks was a major employer in Bishop's Waltham. The works began as the Bishop's Waltham Clay Company, founded by Arthur Helps in 1862. The works, sited west of the town centre across the former palace's fishponds, was on a geologically suitable site: both the major clay types of the Hampshire Basin – the London Clay and Reading Formation beds – were present at different but easily accessible levels. The company started making clay bricks and tiles, and in 1864 began making terracotta architectural and homeware products to try to compete with the established Staffordshire potteries. Arthur Helps invested the works' minimal profits and much of his own fortune in building new housing for workers (creating the district of Newtown south of the brickworks in the process) and the unsuccessful attempt to build the Bishops Waltham Railway (see below). Economic recession finally caused the collapse of the business in 1867. The defunct works was acquired by the Blanchard family of London, already owners of a terracotta works in Lambeth, and restarted operations in 1871. In 1880 the Bishop's Waltham Clay Company was merged with Blanchard & Co., which made Bishop's Waltham the centre of its new operation and invested heavily in the works. Blanchard terracotta made at Bishop's Waltham became world-famous for its even bright red colour and rare combination of hard, smooth external texture and great strength.

Buildings using Blanchard terracotta include Buckingham Palace and the Natural History Museum, London, plus buildings as far away as Peru and Egypt. Blanchard continued to produce various types of brick and tile at Bishops Waltham as well, which were used extensively on railway construction and other civil engineering projects in the county. Both the Hockley Railway Viaduct and Privett railway tunnel on the Meon Valley Railway – each the longest of their type in Hampshire – used Blanchard bricks. Much of the Victorian housing stock in Newton, Waltham Chase, Swanmore and as far afield as Southampton and Portsmouth is made from bricks fired at Bishop's Waltham. In 1918 the Blanchard brothers, lacking heirs to pass the business to, sold the works to the prominent Southampton-based builders' merchants Elliott Brothers. They continued to run the business throughout the inter-war period but the relatively small scale of the Bishop's Waltham works, the lack of room for expansion and the dwindling amount of viable clay deposits on the site caused a decline in fortunes. There was also competition from larger brickworks in the Midlands owned by the London Brick Company, making more bricks each day than the Blanchards works made in a year (1.5 million bricks and 650,000 tiles in 1956) meant that the operation became increasingly unviable. The site received major bomb damage during the Second World War and Elliotts closed the Bishop Waltham works (still widely known as 'Blanchards') in 1957. The site is now the Claylands industrial estate and business park – there is still an Elliotts builders' merchant branch on the former brickworks site.

== Bus services ==
There is one main bus stop in Bishop's Waltham - The Square. This stop has an average of three services an hour in each direction. Bishop's Waltham has two bus companies that operate from Bishop's Waltham square: Stagecoach South and Xelabus.

== Closed railway line ==
Bishop's Waltham's commercial status warranted the construction of the Bishops Waltham branch line railway to the town from Botley in 1862. The railway became part of the London and South Western Railway in the 1870s, who operated distinctive steam railcars on the line for passenger services, although the majority of traffic was goods – with bricks leaving the town and coal for the gasworks coming in. The LSWR laid on special services to allow farmers to bring their cattle to market at Bishop's Waltham, with trains made up of a mix of cattle trucks and passenger carriages. The line was closed to regular passenger traffic in 1932, but goods services remained, becoming ever less frequent and regular before finally stopping in the 1960s. Bishop's Waltham station was a distinctive brick/half-timbered design with numerous architectural details produced in terracotta by the local brickworks, which stood where the main roundabout in the town – now known as the Old Station Roundabout – at the junction of the B2177 and the B3035 towards Corhampton now is. A short section of the line and a pair of level crossing gates next to the roundabout have been preserved.

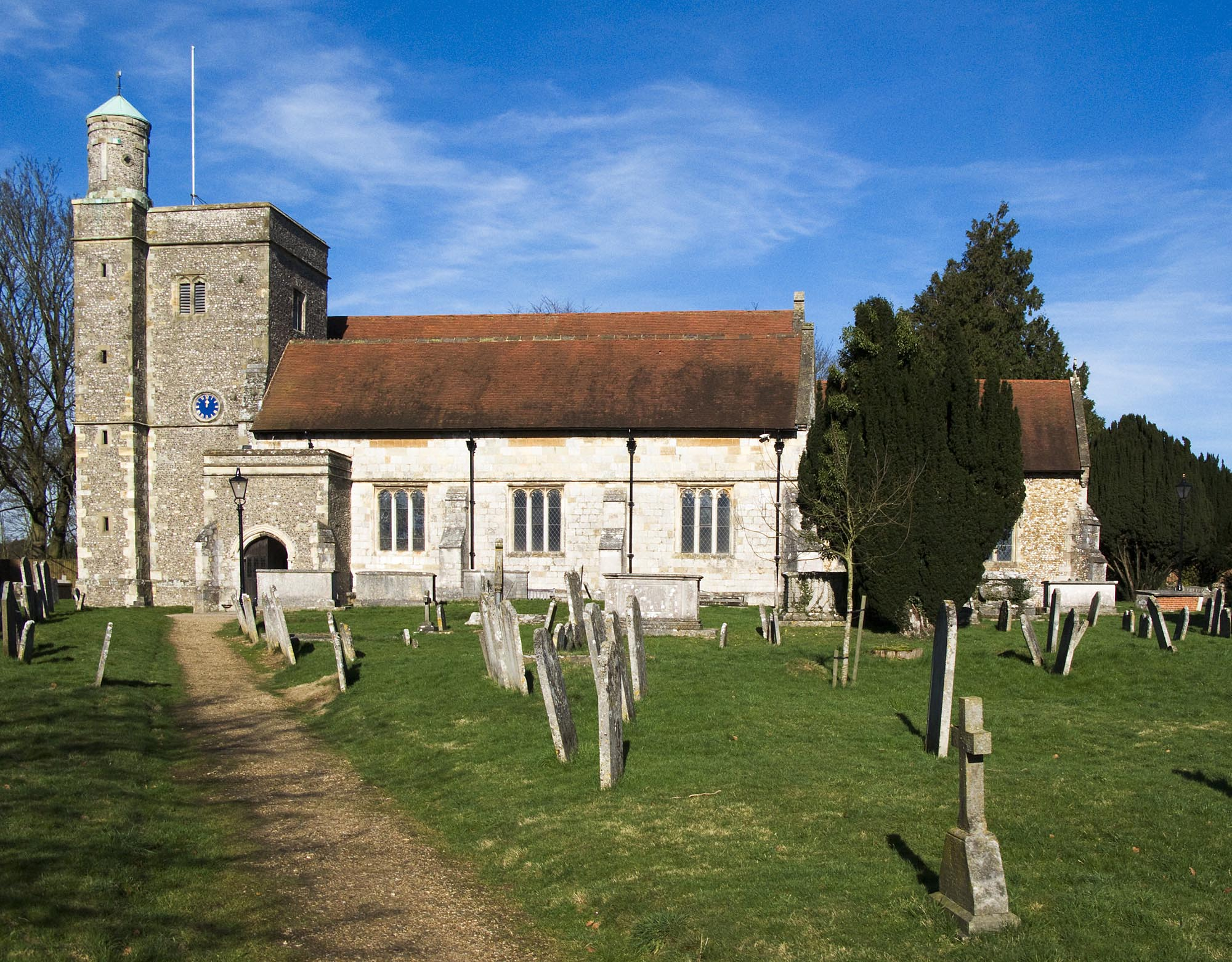
St Peter's Church Bishop's Waltham

== Culture and attractions ==
Bishop's Waltham is twinned with Saint-Bonnet-le-Château in France. The Palace grounds are frequently used to hold festivals and other events. The town has a small museum.

The Bishop's Waltham Youth Theatre is run by local theatre directors associated with the Theatre Royal, Winchester.

== The Moors ==
The Moors, Bishop's Waltham is a Site of Special Scientific Interest. It is a nationally significant tract of alkaline wetland and open waters located south of the Chalk outcrop in southern Hampshire at the head of River Hamble displaying a good diversity of habitat types, plant and animal communities and rare species. As a result, not only is the majority of the site designated as a Site of Special Scientific Interest (SSSI) under the UK Wildlife and Countryside Act, but also as a Nature Conservation Review (NCR) site, in recognition of its special national interest.

The land comprises some 34 ha (84 acres) mainly of hydrologically sensitive fen, fen meadow and wet woodland dissected by a series of south and west flowing streams and drains totalling some 1,265 m (4,150 ft) in length. Some of the drains originate from one-time watercress beds fed by clear chalk water springs and feed into either the Western Stream arising off the 'Sand Boils' or the Eastern Stream arising off Alexanders Moors. Both streams flow into Waltham Mill Pond and from where the water passes to The Moors Stream, a headwater of the River Hamble. The 'Sand Boils' is an area at the head of the West Stream in which upwelling spring water creates swirling sandy patches in the gravelly streambed.

The Moors comprises the wetland area fed by springs and surface watercourses within the SSSI and adjacent land and which discharge into the Waltham Mill Pond. Water from the mill pond passes through Chase Mill and then downstream as The Moors Stream tributary to join the Northbrook Stream tributary of the River Hamble.

Dundridge Meadows is a 7.5 hectares (19 acres) Local Nature Reserve near Bishop's Waltham.

== River Hamble ==
The country town and parish of Bishop's Waltham lies in the Hamble Valley at the junction of chalk downs and coastal plains which gives rise to the tributary of the River Hamble at Northbrook on the northern edge of the town. The river then flows south, through the North and South Ponds, and then out towards Botley, where the Moors Stream tributary joins the Northbrook Stream tributary on the southern edge of Bishop's Waltham. The river then flows through Curdridge to the head of the tidal estuary at Fairthorne.

== Education ==
Bishop's Waltham Junior School was established in 1969. Following the July 2010 Ofsted inspection, the school was rated as Grade 1 'Outstanding', Under the most recent Ofsted Inspection in 2017, the school was rated as Grade 2 'Good'. It is a two form entry school for children aged 7–11 years old. Its feeder school is Bishops Waltham Infant School. Its pupils are in the catchment for Swanmore College senior school.

Bishop's Waltham Infant School was rated as Grade 1 'Outstanding' by Ofsted in 2011. It is a two form entry infant school for children who are 4–7 years old.

On the same site, Lilypad Pre-School operates. Bishop's Waltham Montessori is also located in the town, and was rated Grade 1 'Outstanding' by Ofsted in 2016.

== Sport and leisure ==
There is a large youth development club called Bishop's Waltham Dynamos who use the facilities at Priory Park. The Dynamos were founded in 1975 and are now one of the largest junior and youth football clubs in Hampshire, with the largest membership of any society and club within the town of Bishop's Waltham and its confines.

Bishop's Waltham Cricket Club runs three sides in the Hampshire Cricket League in addition to junior teams and non-league teams that play friendly matches. The ground is beyond the allotments at the end of Albany Road.

Bishop's Waltham has two tennis courts at Hoe Road Recreation Ground. Children's Coaching is available on Sunday mornings.

== The Priory ==
The Priory, a large red-brick house at Newtown, Bishop's Waltham, was built in the 1860s for an infirmary, the land being given by Sir Arthur Helps, a benefactor to the neighbourhood. Prince Leopold laid the foundation stone in 1864, and Sir Frederick Perkins presented a statue of the Prince Consort.

== The Waltham Blacks ==
The Waltham Blacks were a group of deer poachers operating and terrorising local people, and were famous, not only for deer stealing, but also for having an Act of Parliament the Black Act 1723 passed to stop them. The Act, passed in 1723, made it a felony to "appear armed, disguised or with a blackened face, being so designed to kill deer, rob a warren or to steal fish".

== Gunner and Company ==
Gunner and Company was an English private bank, based in Bishop's Waltham, Hampshire. Founded in 1809, it served as the primary provincial bank for Bishop's Waltham and the Meon Valley throughout much of the nineteenth century. It was the last provincial private bank in the United Kingdom, from 1921 until it was bought out by Barclays Bank in 1953. The Gunner family continued to run the legal practice of Gunner & Carpenter until 1973.

== Notable people ==
- Henry of Blois (1098/9 – 8 August 1171), Norman Bishop of Winchester often known as Henry of Winchester – younger brother of Stephen King of England and grandson of William the Conqueror
- Admiral of the Fleet Andrew Cunningham, 1st Viscount Cunningham of Hyndhope
- Daniel Foxx, comedian and social media influencer
- Amanda Holden, actress and presenter.
- Sir William Jenner, Physician to Queen Victoria.
- Reverend George Marshall (1753–1819), curate and chaplain, promotor of education for the poor.
- Sir William Parry (19 December 1790 – 8 or 9 July 1855): Northbrook House was the residence of the Arctic explorer Parry, and here Lieutenant Cresswell brought him the news of the finding of the north-west passage.
- Jeff Stelling, broadcaster lives in the village
- Admiral Edward Vernon (1684–1757). Vernon Hill House, which stands on the hill of the same name to the north-east of Bishop's Waltham, was built by Admiral Vernon just after the capture of Porto Bello.
- Dr Samuel Ward, one of the translators of the authorised version of the Bible, was buried at Bishop's Waltham in 1629.

== Historic public houses ==
The Crown Inn, the Square, Bishop's Waltham – The Crown Hotel, parts of which date from the 1500s, was once a coaching inn and had two court yards at the rear with stables and brew houses, the inner yard being overlooked by an open gallery. In the 1960s the house reverted to its former and more correct designation of inn and considerable alterations have taken place since.

The White Swan, Bank Street, Bishop's Waltham closed October 2006

The Mafeking Hero, Bank Street, Bishop's Waltham. Now Closed. This was a 17th-century coaching inn that was initially known as The White Hart; however, it was renamed after the 217-day siege of Mafeking, in South Africa, had been relieved in 1900. The pub name honoured men from the village who survived the siege. A Whitbread Ales pub at time of closure, but earlier it was Blakes Ales of Gosport.

The White Horse Beeches Hill, Bishop's Waltham – Closed in 2010. Formerly a popular country pub with open fires.

The Priory Inn, Winchester Road Bishop's Waltham. Formerly The Railway Inn due to the links with the station and railway line that used to run through Bishop's Waltham

The Barleycorn, Basingwell Street, Bishop's Waltham. The Barleycorn Inn is a 17th-century oak beamed building. At one time it was understood to be a brewery and before that a paupers' house, with the paupers living upstairs and what is now the saloon bar being used as a pigsty

The Bunch of Grapes, St Peters Street, Bishop's Waltham. Dating from the 16th Century, set in one of Bishop's Waltham's most picturesque streets.

The Kings Head St Georges Square, This pub closed c.1914 and became Franck Stubbs estate agents and is now a Chinese restaurant

The Brewery Tap was situated on Brook Street. This pub was present in 1911 and is now partly used as a betting shop

The Brewery Arms was situated on Bank Street. This pub was present in 1911.

The Crows Nest was situated on the High Street. This pub was present in 1911 and is now used as a pharmacy

The Dolphin was situated on the High Street. This pub was present by 1859; however, it had become a tailors shop by 1897. Now used as a greengrocers shop.

The Red Lion was situated on Red Lion Street (now part of the car park). This pub was present in 1859.

The Wheatsheaf, Free Street, Bishops Waltham. This pub closed c.1912. It was situated on the corner of Free Street and is now called Old Wheatsheaf Cottage

== Abbey Mill ==
Abbey Mill, Station Road, Bishops Waltham was built in 1862. Trade directories for Abbey Mill show that millers John Hague (1867) John Edwards (1871) Henry Hurley and several others ran the mill around the turn of the century before James Duke took it over in 1902 and subsequently run by the Duke Family until the business closed with the milling operation having been transferred to the old Edwards Brewery site in Lower Lane, Bishop's Waltham. Abbey Mill was then used for offices until sold for redevelopment in circa 2005 to the supermarket chain Sainsburys. The redevelopment never actually took place and the site is up for sale.
