= Daniel Foxx =

British social media influencer

- Born: Bishop Waltham
- Education: King's College London
- Occupations: Comedian, influencer, author

Daniel Foxx (born 1993 or 1994) is a British comedian, influencer, and author. He is known for his standup routines and social media creation. He has written one published book, Bedtime Stories for Privileged Children. His second book, Fairytales for Privileged Children, is set to release in September 2026.

== Biography ==
Foxx was born in 1993 or 1994 and was raised in Bishop's Waltham in Hampshire. He has stated that he wanted to escape the countryside, and so attended King's College London. During college, he volunteered to host a talent show, and to gain experience participated in an open mic night. He did not do very well, but spent the following week researching and preparing, and at the end of that week attended an open mic night, where he was awarded a trophy.

He then decided to become a comedian, and was paid 15 pounds for his first gig. During COVID, he began creating more content online, and by 2026 had accumulated over half a million followers. His content often includes parodies of wealthy families. Another one of his series includes him as a devil. A third includes him as a supervillain's gay assistant.

He made his debut at the Edinburgh Fringe Festival with a show titled Villain, in which his hair was stylized into horns. It emphasized songs and self-acceptance. He also discussed fairy tales during the show.

He began creating a series of sketches focused on fairytales for privileged children. This turned into books. The first, Bedtime Stories for Privileged Children, was published in 2024. The second, Fairytales for Privileged Children, is set to release in September 2026.

He went on a UK-wide tour dubbed Villain in 2024. In 2026, he began a comedy tour around the UK and Australia named How Lovely.

He hosts the podcast Welcome to Hell with fellow comedian Dane Buckley, which is now on its third series. Immediately upon its launching, it entered the top 10 comedy podcasts on Apple. It emphasizes confessions and has featured celebrity guests.

He co-wrote Unfortunate: The Untold Story of Ursula The Sea Witch, a queer retelling of The Little Mermaid with Ursula as the main character.
