= Dundridge Meadows =

Nature reserve in Hampshire, England

Coordinates: 50.960°N 1.200°W

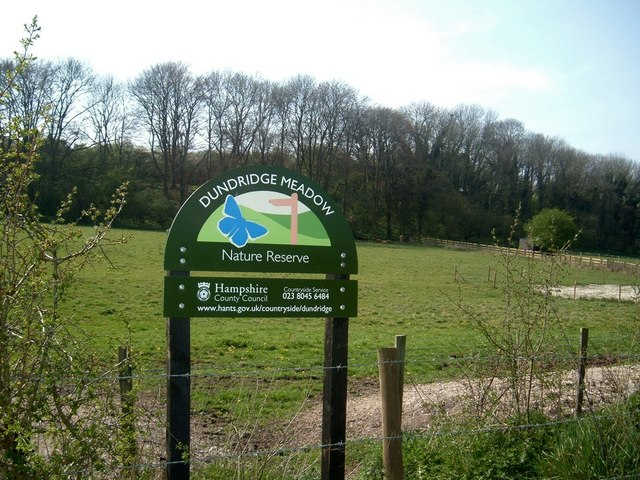
- Interactive map of Dundridge Meadows
- Type: Local Nature Reserve
- Location: Bishop's Waltham, Hampshire
- OS grid: SU 563 181
- Area: 7.5 hectares (19 acres)
- Manager: Hampshire County Council Countryside Service

Dundridge Meadows is a 7.5-hectare (19-acre) Local Nature Reserve near Bishop's Waltham in Hampshire. It is owned by Hampshire County Council and managed by Hampshire County Council Countryside Service.

These meadows are chalk grassland managed for hay. There are also two ponds, ancient woodlands and species-rich hedges. Flowering plants include cowslips and hayrattle.
