= Gunner and Company =

Gunner and Company was an English private bank, based in Bishop's Waltham, Hampshire.

Founded in 1809, it served as the primary provincial bank for Bishop's Waltham and the Meon Valley throughout much of the nineteenth century. It was the last provincial private bank in the United Kingdom, from 1921 until it was bought out by Barclays Bank in 1953.

The Gunner family continued to run the legal practice of Gunner & Carpenter until 1973.

== History ==
Formally known as the Bishop's Waltham and Hampshire Bank, it was founded by four partners: Thomas Fox, a dealer in wine and spirits; Stephen Steele, a farmer; John Seymour, a doctor and William Gummer, a solicitor. Each partner contributed £1,000 and the Bank opened in the office of William Gunner. From the outset it was a bank of issue but this ceased after 1844. The partners were not full-time bankers and from the outset they recruited a clerk to manage the day-to-day business. John Mansell was aged only 20 on appointment; he stayed for 42 years and was still the Bank's only clerk when he retired.

Changes in the partnership gradually shifted control to the Gunner family, hence the popular name Gunners Bank. Steele left in 1816, Fox died in 1834 and Seymour in 1849. William Gummer brought in two sons, though only Charles stayed. When William, the last of the founding partners, retired in 1851, the Bank was reconstituted. Charles Gunner was joined by Thomas Fox, the founder's nephew and Thomas Ridge, William Gunner's nephew, a case of true nepotism. John Mansell retired and was replaced as sole clerk by his son-in-law, James Lock. As the three partners only met twice a year, Lock ran the Bank. Charles Gummer died in 1874 aged only 54 and his wife took her husband's place; Lock made Managing Partner. Ridge died in 1873 and Fox left in 1877 leaving Gunners run by Mrs Gunner and Lock.

The firm remained in Gunner hands from that point on, and the Bank continued as a local entity, trading profitably but increasingly anomalous in the world of joint stock banking. It was difficult for country banks to compete with the size and range of services offered by the joint stock banks. Indeed, since the 1920s, Gunners had been the sole remaining “private and family” bank. By the 1950s the senior Gunner partners were in their 60s and no new blood was forthcoming; in 1953 the Bank was sold to Barclays. One final touch from Pressnell indicated the gap between the old and the new: Gunners “did not possess a telephone line until its last years”.
