= Elliott Brothers (builders merchant) =

Elliott Brothers Ltd

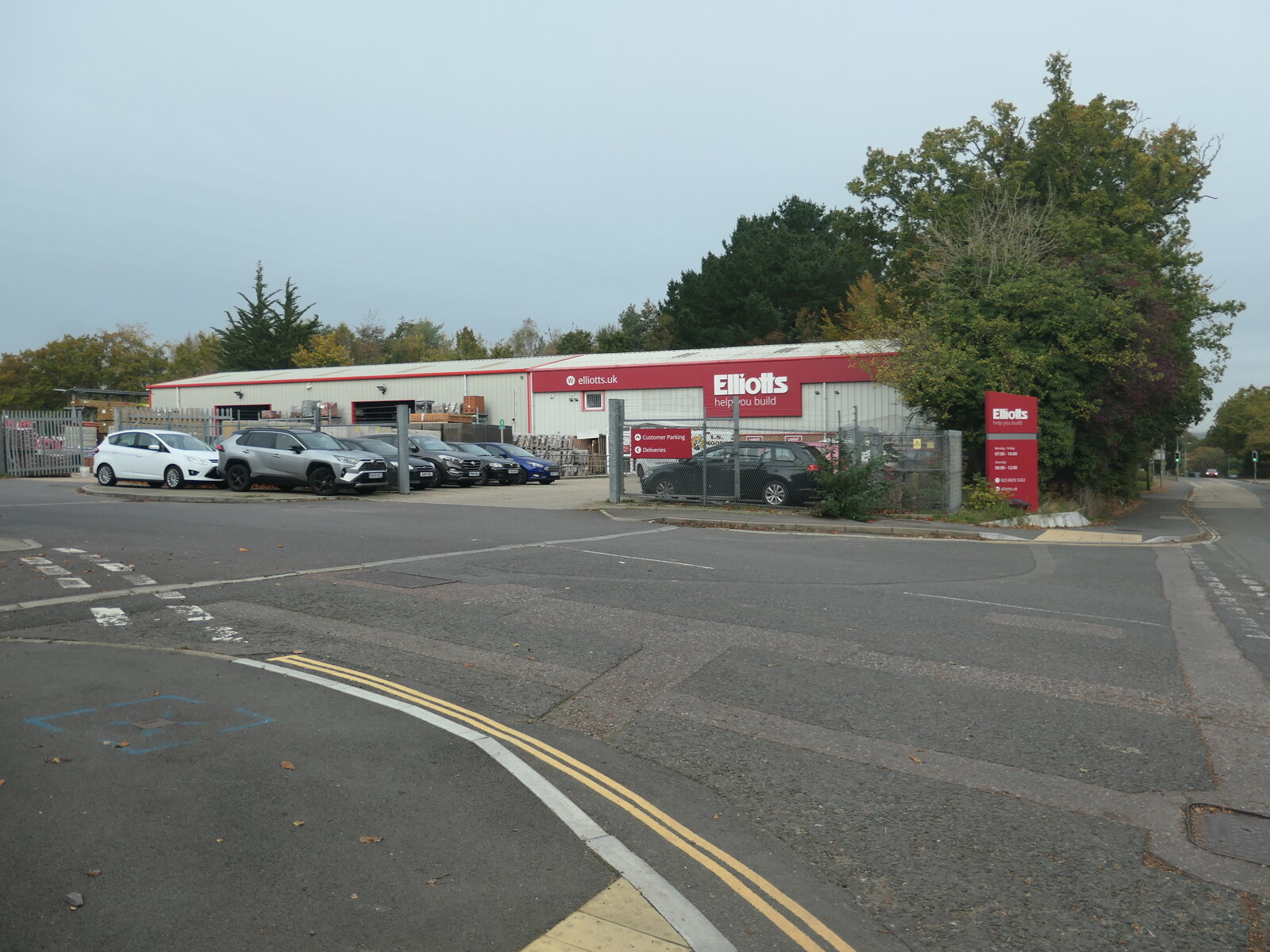
- Branch at Chandler's Ford
- Trade name: Elliotts
- Founded: October 1840; 185 years ago in Southampton, United Kingdom
- Founder: Thomas Elliott
- Headquarters: Millbank Street, Northam, United Kingdom
- Areas served: Hampshire; Dorset; UK (webshop)
- Products: building materials; tools
- Divisions: Elliott Brothers; Elliotts Premier Roofing
- Website: elliotts.uk

Elliott Brothers is a builders' merchant based in Southampton, United Kingdom. The company's headquarters is in Millbank Street, Northam and it has a chain of outlets in and around Hampshire and Dorset. It also operates an online tool warehouse that serves the whole of the United Kingdom. Elliott Brothers and Elliotts Premier Roofing constitute the two components of the holding company, Elliott Brothers Limited.

The company can trace its origins to October 1840 when 26-year-old Thomas Elliott took over the Southampton business of Robert Young who had died earlier in the year. Young's business had been based at Godfrey's Town on the banks of the River Itchen about 0.5 km south-west of the headquarters of the present-day company. Within five years Thomas had purchased a nearby cement works and had extended the range of products sold to include cement, lime, bricks, chimneypieces and many other items. Over the ensuing 40 years until his death in 1886 Thomas continued to expand the firm though at a slower rate. Meanwhile, his brother John was involved with the building and restoration of several churches around Southampton and in Sussex until his death in 1891.

Shortly before his death Thomas handed over control of the firm to two of his sons, Frank and Walter, and it was they who first gave the firm the name Elliott Brothers. They reinvigorated the enterprise and, by 1893, it merited the description "General Builders Merchants". In 1901 the firm was incorporated with the name Elliott Brothers Ltd. The doubling of Southampton's population between 1890 and 1920 stimulated a further increase in Elliotts' business and, by the late 1930s, annual sales were regularly exceeding £50,000.

Sales plummeted during World War II but, by 1956, when Elliotts' first branch was opened at Bishop's Waltham, they were on the increase again. Between 1960 and 1973 turnover increased sixfold and, in 1980, turnover passed the £5 million mark. In 1982 a second branch was opened at Fareham. New branches continued to be opened until, by 2015, including the Millbank headquarters, there were 13 outlets in Hampshire and Dorset.

== Thomas and John Elliott and Robert Young ==
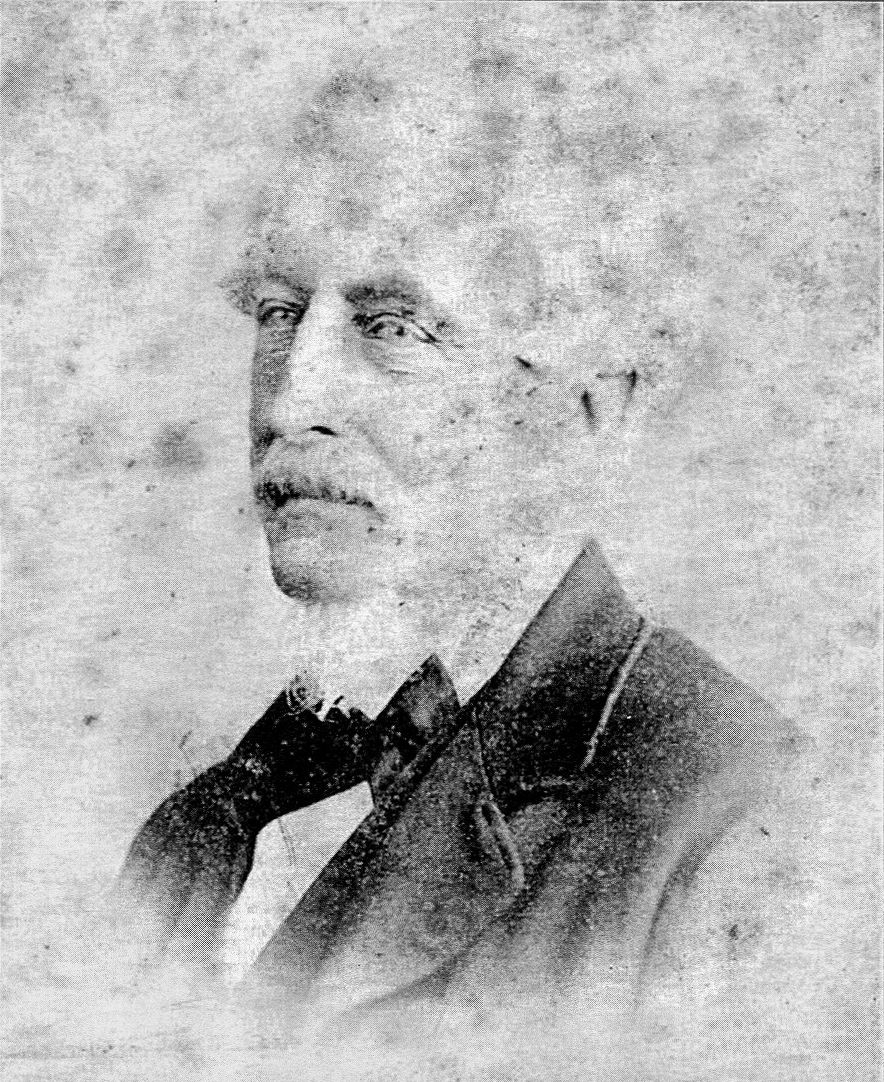
Thomas Christopher Elliott

Thomas Christopher Elliott, born 1814, was one of the six children of John Elliott and his wife Maria née Strong of Lewes, Sussex. John senior was a grocer and wine merchant with a shop at 49 High Street, Lewes. The Elliott family of Sussex can be traced back to a Thomas Elliott who died in Bury north of Arundel in 1551. The family had lived in that area of west Sussex until John senior moved to Lewes during the first decade of the 19th century.

The sons of John and Maria Elliott involved in the early years of the firm were Thomas Elliott and John Elliott Jr. However, they were not the brothers to which the present-day name of the company refers. They were Thomas's sons, Frank and Walter, to whom he handed over the enterprise.

During the mid-1830s, working at first from their father's shop, Thomas and his older brother John, born 1811, operated as commissioning agents for emigration to the colonies. Later in the decade John moved west to Chichester where he set up business as an architect, builder and writer on architectural subjects. There he designed the Corn Exchange and the east wing and ballroom of Goodwood House near Chichester. Both buildings were erected in 1837. In 1838, John was commissioned to design and build St James' Church in the Sussex village of Emsworth, close to the Hampshire border. On 14 September 1841, he married Maria Martin of Cheltenham in Chichester and, three weeks later, when his neo-Norman church at Emsworth was consecrated, John and his new wife would undoubtedly have been present.

In 1840, John began work on the build of a new chapel of ease in Broadwater, near Worthing but, during its construction, the church authorities who had commissioned and approved the design, change their minds. As a result of their failing to reach agreement with Elliott they refused to pay him and he was driven into bankruptcy. In subsequent years John Elliott was involved in many projects relating to churches in Sussex and Hampshire. Most of these involved restoration but he also received the occasional commission to design and build a new church. After his experiences in Worthing, he was always careful to get a binding agreement before he started work.

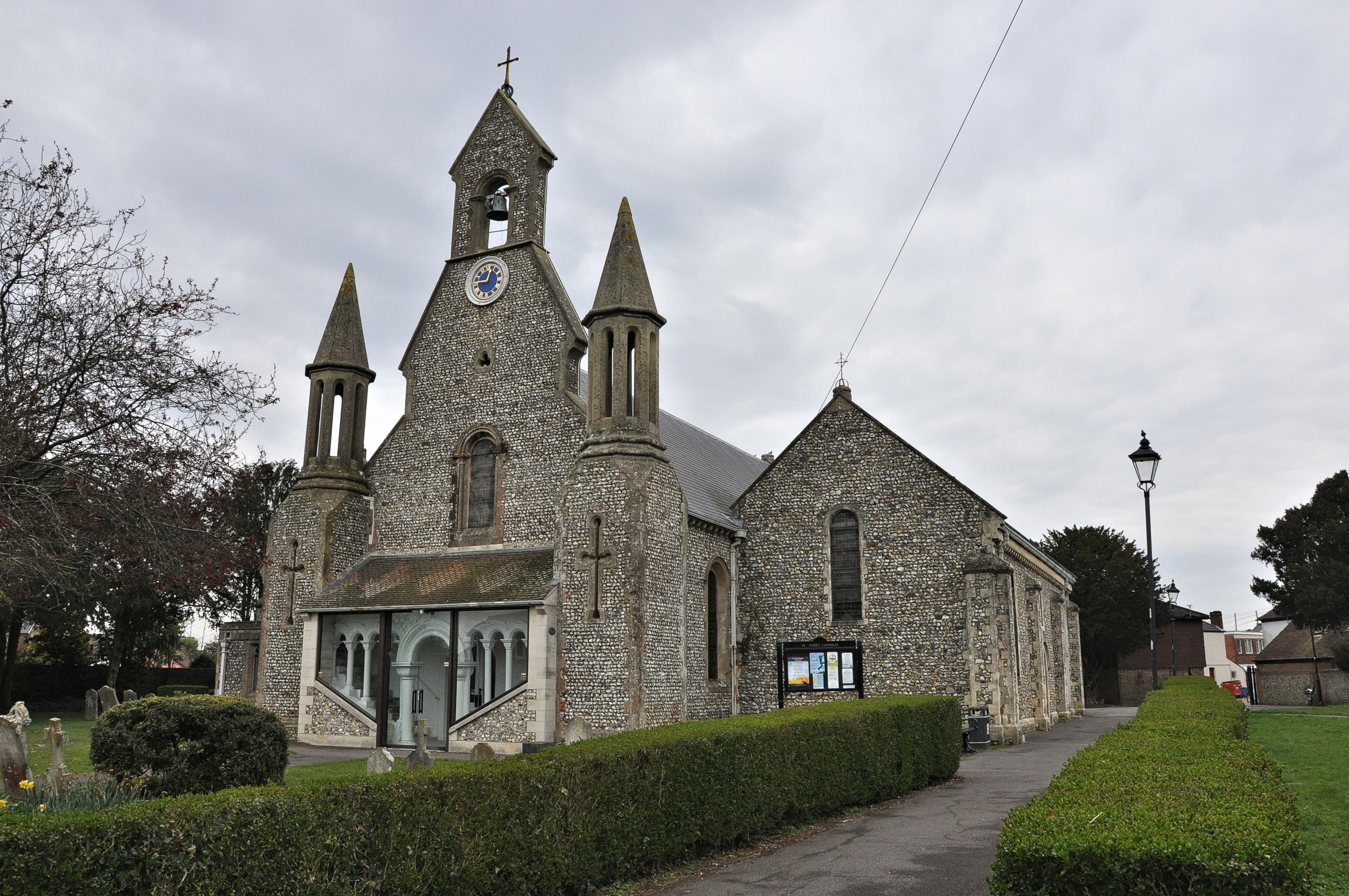
St James' Church, Emsworth.

In 1839, Thomas was still in his father's shop in Lewes but, during the following year, he moved to Southampton and took up lodgings in the home of Robert Young and his wife Charlotte née Shayer. They lived in St Mary's Cottage, St Mary's Place, in the parish of St Mary's. Charlotte was related to the Southampton painter William Shayer. Robert Young started his working life as a slater but, in 1826, he also became the landlord of the Crown and Anchor Inn, in Four-Posts in the Southampton suburb of Freemantle. He therefore transferred the slate business to the inn. By the mid 1830s, he had given up the inn and had become slate merchant, slater and general builder. By the time Robert Young died August 1840, Thomas Elliott may already have taken up residence in St Mary's Cottage. By October that year, it had been agreed between him and Charlotte that he should take over Robert's business. Charlotte Young died in April 1852. During 1841 and 1842, when Thomas was in the early stages of developing the business that he had taken over from Young, John was still living in Chichester but he too was soon to move to Southampton.

== The early days ==
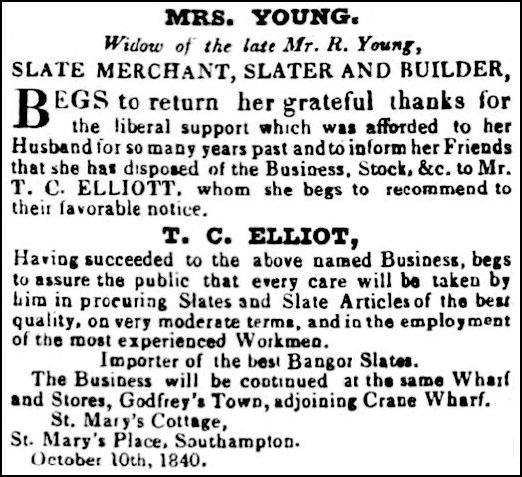
Hampshire Advertiser, October 1840

After his 1826 advertisement announcing his relocation, Robert Young had never advertised his business and it had remained small. However, when Thomas Elliott took over the business an advertisement to that effect did appear in the Hampshire Advertiser of 17 October 1840.

Young's stores and works in Godfrey's Town had been on the west bank of the lower reaches of the River Itchen. During his first two years, Elliott also based his operations there. But he was determined to expand and, in the late summer of 1842, the opportunity arose to purchase the business of the London Cement Works. The proprietor was one William Hale and, as implied by his 1841 advertisement, the cement was not produced in London but rather was manufactured on the 'London principle'.

Elliott took the opportunity to purchase the cement works and, on 17 September 1842, an advertisement to that effect appeared in the Advertiser. They were situated on the banks of the River Itchen adjacent to Millbank Wharf, Northam, only 0.5 km (0.31 mi) north of the Godfrey's Town stores that Elliott had purchased from Robert Young. Godfrey's Town was also known as Crabniton and is marked as such on the 1871 Ordnance Survey town plan of Southampton. (Note: link to the 1871 Ordnance Survey town plan of Southampton. Crabniton is indistinctly marked just west of Britannia Wharf on the west bank of the lower reaches of the River Itchen. The Millbank cement works can be seen to the north-east of the wharf.) With the acquisition of Hale's works, Elliott could add Roman cement, Plaster of Paris, various types of lime and gypsum to his stock list. The Millbank works became the base of Elliott's operations and has remained as such ever since.

In his bid to expand the business, Elliott inserted frequent advertisements in the Advertiser and also in the Southampton directories of 1843, 1845 and 1847. The 1845 advertisement, perhaps for the last time also mentions the commission agency that he and John had been operating both in Southampton and Chichester. Soon after, that activity was discontinued.

In 1843, Thomas Elliott took a lease out on a property just across the river at 2 Bridge Road, Itchen. It became the home not only of Thomas himself, but also for John and Maria. It was also used as an office by both brothers. To get to the Millbank site, Thomas would have crossed the river by means of the Itchen ferry and the Woolston Floating Bridge that had been constructed in 1836. By the time of his marriage in 1847, Thomas Elliott had moved to Portswood Villa in Portswood leaving the use of the Bridge Road property. to John, Maria and Agnes, the daughter who had been born to them in 1844.

By 1849, Thomas Elliott had extended his business to the sale of bricks, tiles, chimney pieces, dairy fittings, baths, washstands, cattle troughs and paint. Meanwhile, John was engaged in a survey of old churches for the diocese of Chichester. He had become honorary architect to the Sussex Diocesan Association and had already participated in the rebuilding of several churches in Sussex.

In the late 1840s, Thomas was involved in the building of about 30 houses on Millbank Street, a road that ran north-east from the wharf. It is very likely John too partook in the project as he had already published an essay on the construction of cottages. Also in the late 1840s, by taking out leases on adjoining land, Thomas doubled its original acreage of the Millbank site. In the 1850s and 1860s both Thomas and John Elliott were involved in the sale and rent of property.

== The descendants of Thomas Elliott ==
On 5 October 1847, Thomas Elliott married Mary Jane Mason, the second daughter of Thomas Mason, town clerk of Doncaster in Yorkshire. Over the first twenty years of their marriage, Mary was to bear Thomas ten children three of whom, Frank (1852–1918), Walter (1857–1935) and Frederick (1855–1928), were to play important parts in the family firm. A fourth, Edgar (1861–1937), was to run a brewing enterprise that Thomas had started in the 1870s. Mary's surname was later used in the given names of about 15 descendants of Thomas and Mary. Four of them were to play important parts in the operation of the firm:

- Edgar's son, Newlyn Mason Elliott (1890–1968), known as Mason, managing director 1935–1966.
- Mason's son, George Edgar Newlyn Mason Elliott (1924–2007), known as Newlyn Mason, chairman 1969–1985.
- Newlyn Mason's son, Stuart Graham Mason-Elliott (born 1951), known as Stuart, the current chairman.
- Stuart's son, Thomas Edgar Mason Elliott (born 1984), known as Tom, as of 2016 the current managing director.

== The later years of the 19th century ==
By 1864, Thomas Elliott and Robert Young before him had been manufacturing Roman cement on the banks of the Itchen for over 40 years. Roman cement is a natural product and its manufacture does not generate particularly obnoxious fumes. However, in 1864, Elliott started producing Portland cement, the manufacture of which releases pollutants, notably sulphur dioxide. As a result of complaints from neighbours, Elliott was taken to court. Whilst three hearings were taking place in late 1865 Elliott implemented measures designed to reduce the nuisance. These were found sufficient for the case to be dismissed. However, at the same time, a further summons was taken out against him and, this time, he was fined £5 with costs. The costs were much greater than the fine itself for, all told, Elliott was the poorer by £150.

For Thomas Elliott the 1860s and 1870s would have been a period of consolidation. He no longer needed to advertise regularly. A few small classified advertisements appeared from time to time but no large display advertisements were placed. Also there were occasional advertisements for the sale or let of houses, sometimes inserted by John. In 1871, Thomas Elliott's firm had over 30 employees including his sons, Frank and Walter. At about same time, in partnership with Henry Vincent, he acquired a Southampton brewery along with four Public houses.

In January 1883, Thomas transferred as a gift the whole of his business to Frank and Walter who gave it the name of Elliott Brothers. When Thomas himself died aged 71, on 26 April 1886, his estate amounted to close on £84,000 – a very considerable sum for the time. The estate included a house at Bassett Mount with stabling, gardens, meadows, land and all household effects plus his interests both in the Millbank Works and the brewery. By comparison, his brother John, who died in 1891 in Uckfield, Sussex, left only £583.

Frank and Walter Elliott gave new life to a firm that had perhaps stagnated somewhat during the last 20 years of their father's life. They acquired of the freehold of Millbank Wharf, started advertising again and extended the range of products. Even include coal was included amongst the commodities for sale. In an 1891 display advertisement, coal and slate featured as the most prominent products.

At around this time, a 74-ton sailing vessel, the Alice Moor, was acquired or commissioned by the firm to transport the slates from Porthmadog to Millbank Wharf. But, unfortunately, in January 1901, the vessel was driven ashore and badly damaged at whilst leaving Porthmadog. Although the damage was repaired, Elliotts no longer used the schooner. It was destroyed in 1904 in a fire off Yarmouth.

In a comprehensive article published in 1893 the firm was for the first time referred to as "General Builders' Merchants". Mention was made of their large showroom, their wharf from which they could dispatch goods to all parts of the country and the fact that they had become agents for Beaulieu white and red bricks. Elliott Brothers continued to operate the brickworks on the Beaulieu estate of Lord Montagu until 1918.

A report of the building at Millbank Wharf was drawn up by professional valuers in December 1900 in anticipation of the proposed incorporation of the company following year. The report stated that the main building comprised a three-room office, two storerooms, five cement kilns, two plaster ovens, a lime mill, a rending store, a circular saw bench, an iron store, a cement store and two engine room complete with boilers. Other buildings included lime kilns, coal stores, cement sheds, brick sheds, iron stores, slurry pits, a cement-drying building, a lime house and a chimney shed. The yard had a frontage to the River Itchen of nearly 400 ft (120 m) and a rear frontage of 460 ft (140 m). The value of the whole property was estimated at £6670 freehold.

== Elliott Brothers Ltd ==
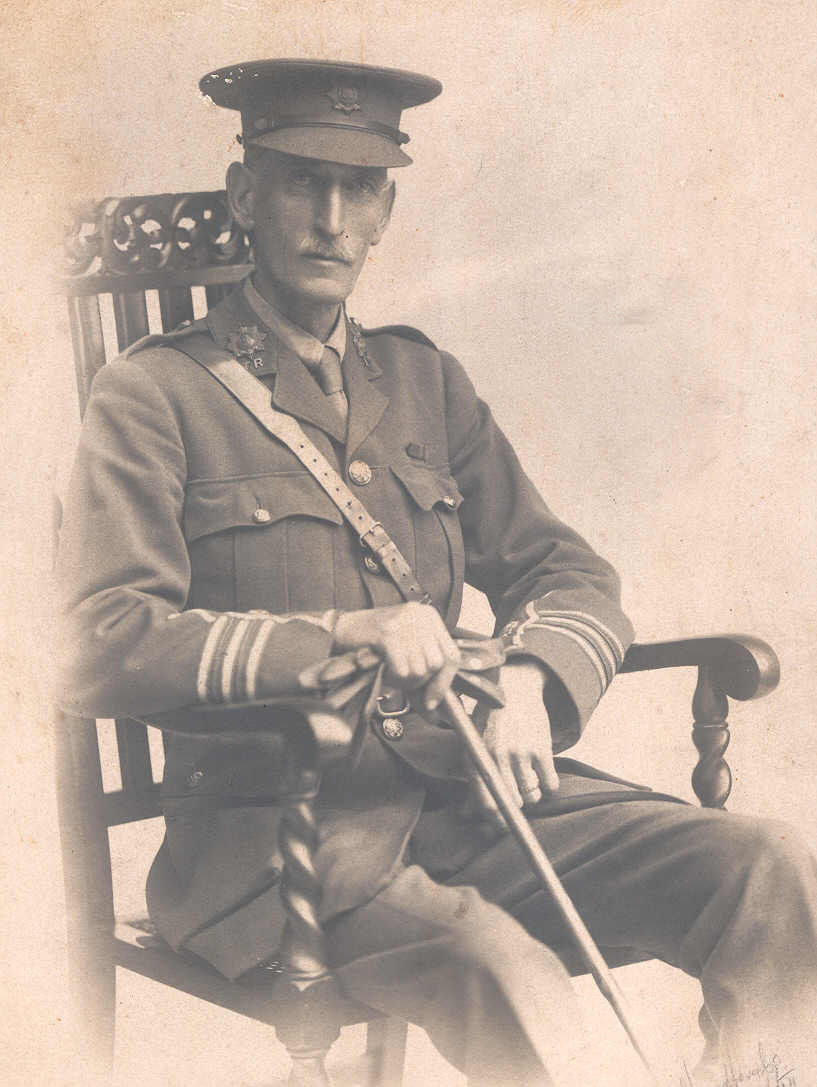
Walter Elliott c 1900

In 1901, Elliott Brothers became a limited company and, as shown in the Articles of Association, the firm's activities were manifold. The products supplied included coal, coke, cement, lime, plaster, whiting, bricks, tiles, pottery, ironmongery and timber. Nevertheless, the sale of Welsh slates continued to be a speciality as it had been since Robert Young's time. In addition to the property mentioned in the report of the previous year the company owned a number of ships and barges. The shareholders were the brothers Frank, Walter, Frederick Elliott, their mother, Mary, and their only sister, Lillian. Frederick had previously been running a timber company in London and brought his business with him to Southampton. At the first board meeting, held at Millbank Wharf, Frank and Walter Elliott were appointed joint managing directors. Meanwhile, another brother, Edgar, was running the Southampton brewery that he had inherited from his father. He had married Emily Gale in 1888 and their first son, Mason Elliott, was born in 1890.

It was during the 30 years from 1891 to 1921 that Southampton's saw its steepest rise in population, increasing from 85,000 in 1891 to 160,000 in 1921. The consequent expansion in house-building during those 30 years – particularly in the town's northern suburbs – stimulated a proportionate increase in Elliotts' business, particularly after its incorporation in 1901.

In 1908, Edgar Elliott's son, Mason, joined the company. On 14 May 1918, Frank Elliott died and his younger brother, Walter, became sole managing director of Elliott Brothers Ltd and, in 1920, Mason was elected to the board. One of Walter's first decisions was to terminate manufacture of cement and lime, an occupation that had been carried on from the earliest days of the company. In December that year, the company purchased the Bishop's Waltham Brickworks of Blanchard & Co Ltd. The Blanchard episode is related in a separate section.

During the 1920s, about 9,400 new houses were built in Southampton. To meet the resulting demand for building materials, Elliotts extended their Millbank premises and acquired an adjacent corn store. In 1924, the firm took a controlling interest in the Guernsey slate and cement dealers, Valpied Ltd. But their presence in Guernsey was not to last long.

The wharf adjacent to the Millbank premises had been a useful asset to the company, particularly for the import coal, slates, sea-sand and timber and of coal and coke. Although the sale of coal was discontinued in 1923, the need for a wharf remained as great as ever. In 1925, after a proposal to enlarge it proved too costly, a small jetty was built to extend it.

On the night of 14 June 1927, a fire broke out in the Millbank timber sheds. The fire it did not extend to the other building but the firm's only lorry was destroyed. Losses for buildings, the lorry and stock amounted to over £10,000. Four new timber sheds were soon built and, during the next few years, several lorries were purchased to replace not only the burnt out one but also the horse-drawn carts that had previously been used.

Frederick Elliott died on 26 October 1928. At a subsequent meeting of the board it was decided that the chairmanship which, since 1918 had rotated amongst members, should in future be held permanently by Walter Elliott. At the same meeting Mason Elliott's brother, Christopher, was elected to the board.

During the 1930s, by acting as agents to various companies, the company added to the range of products it supplied. New items included wood-fibre sheets, bitumen damp courses, steel scaffolding, and clay roofing tiles from France and Belgium. Items such as these contributed to annual sales figures that, during the years 1934–39, annual sales regularly exceeded £50,000.

On 23 May 1935, Walter Elliott died. His 51 years of service with the company had only been interrupted by his wartime service in the Territorial Army during which he had reached the rank of Major. At a board meeting during the following month his nephew, Mason Elliott, was elected managing director. Like his uncle, he had served in the Territorials. It was probably he who persuaded the directors to allow Elliott employees joining the Territorials to be paid full wages whilst attending their two-weeks annual training. During his subsequent wartime service he reached the rank of Brigadier.

The advent of war put an end to the buoyant pre-war sales. Average annual sales plummeted to about £20,000. Anticipating war, the company had amassed a large stock of timber but, in October 1939, almost all of it was requisitioned by the government. In later years the Admiralty took over part of the stores on Millbank Street and the Ministry of Food took possession of another part of the premises for the storage of eggs. In 1941, incendiary bombs destroyed the original company offices. After five years of running the company from improvised offices, a new purpose-built office block was built in Millbank Street in 1950.

== Elliotts after WWII ==
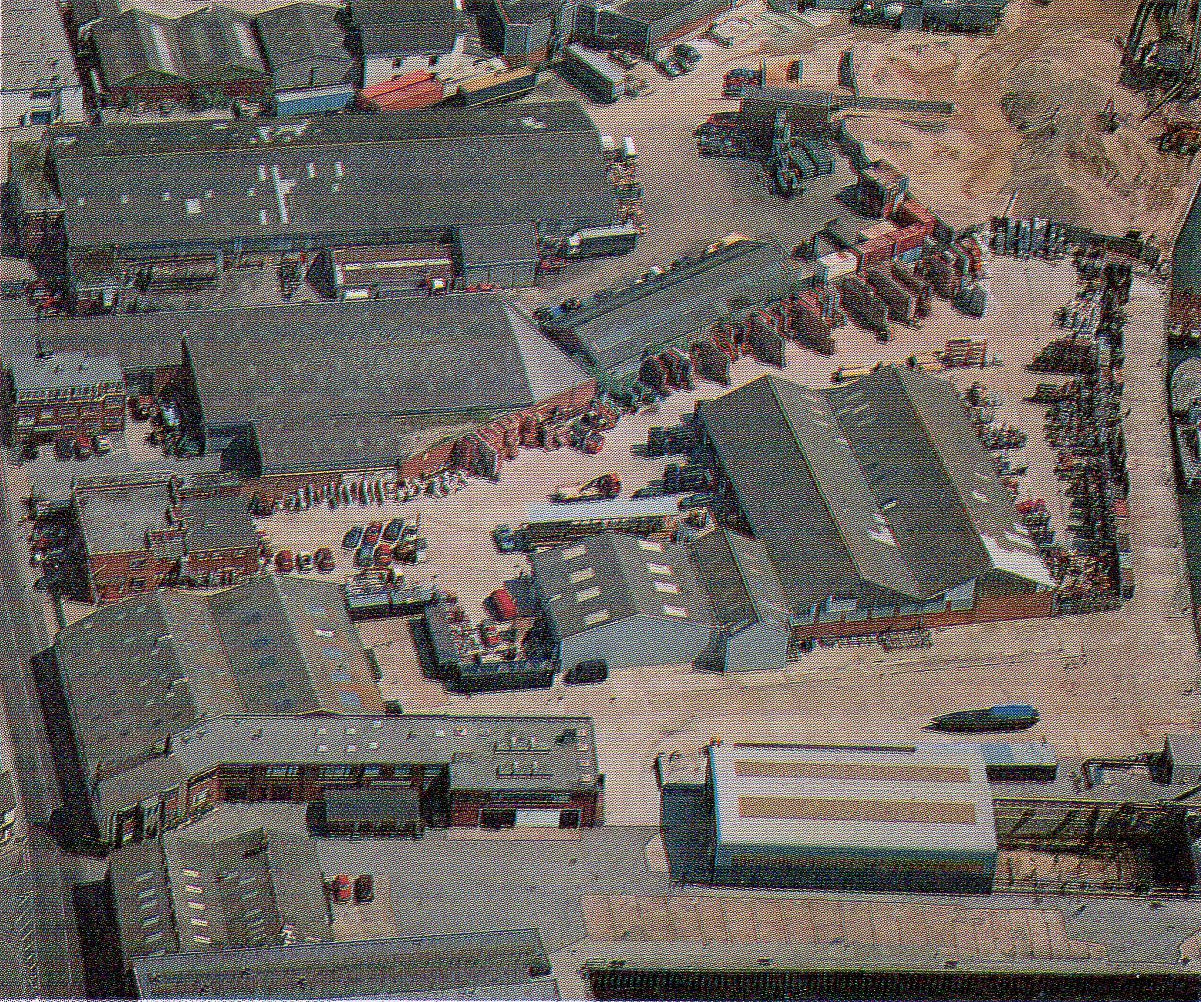
Elliotts Millbank site in 1992

In 1933, Mason Elliott's brother, Christopher, had taken charge of a new roofing section. In 1945 this became the basis of a new subsidiary company, Elliott Brothers (Roofing) Ltd. The annual income of the company increased from £15,000 in 1945 to £90,000 in 1966. Following the Christopher's death in 1969, Newlyn Mason Elliott took over as managing director. In 1973, the company was reintegrated into the main company and became first Elliotts High Performance Roofing and, in 1986, Elliotts Premier Roofing, Ltd.

In 1947, Mason Elliott's son, Newlyn Mason, returned from five years army service and, in the following year, was appointed to the board. During the 1950s the company's turnover rose from £110,000 to £364,000. But the sale of timber sales was contributing such a small proportion of the total output that, in 1954, it was discontinued. However, thirty years later the fact that timber was not supplied by the company was putting it at a competitive disadvantage, so it was resumed.

After the closure of the Blanchard brick works at Bishop's Waltham in 1956, Elliotts turned to the London Brick Company for the supply of most of their bricks. The sales of bricks from them and other sources grew until, by the 1990s, it accounted for one third of total sales. Transportation of bricks within the premises was the main beneficiary of the purchase by the company of forklift trucks in the mid-1960s. Shortly after the delivery of heavy materials to customers was eased by the acquisition of a fleet of crane trucks.

In March 1966, after 45 years of service, 30 of which were as managing director, Mason Elliott handed over the reins of the company to his son, Newlyn Mason. A notable achievement in his final years was to more than double the turnover between 1960 and 1964 in which year it stood at £787,000. However, his retirement was not long. He died in 1966 and, in the following year, his brother Christopher also died.

In 1967, a kitchen and bathroom showroom was opened at Millbank and, after erratic growth during the 1960s, turnover topped £1M for the first time in 1970. During the mid-1970s Elliott Brothers became the first point-of-sale computerised builders' merchant in the country. Both computerisation and mechanical handling contributed to increased efficiency. Although staff numbers only increased from 40 in 1938 to 90 in 1973, turnover over the same period increased 25-fold.

By 1970, as result of its continuing expansion, the company needed to find more space at its Millbank headquarters. 0.5 hectares (1.2 acres) of tidal mud-land was therefore purchased from Southampton Council and a £75,000 scheme of land reclamation was put into operation. The reclaimed area was concreted over and the project work, which was completed in 1973, nearly doubled the area of the Millbank site.

To facilitate overseas trade, a new company, EB (International) Ltd was formed in 1974. Furthermore, a holding company, Elliott Brothers (Builders' Merchants) Ltd was established to which all the assets of Elliott Brothers Ltd and EB International were transferred. In fact the year had not been a good one the firm, or indeed for builders merchants nationally. Nevertheless, Elliott Brothers' annual group sales reached £2M for the first time. Growth during the rest of the decade was significant and in 1980 turnover topped £5M. Meanwhile, market conditions for builders' merchants were changing. Medium-sized and small builders had always been a stock in trade of the company. But such companies were turning to the provision of extensions and rebuilding work rather than undertaking new-builds. Furthermore, the DIY market was expanding rapidly. To meet these requirements the warehouse that fronted Millbank Street was converted into a 1,200 m^{2} (13,000 ft^{2}) self-selection store.

During the 1980s, using the Millbank Street store as a template, branches were opened at Ringwood, Fareham, Chandler's Ford and Fordingbridge. With the headquarters at Millbank and the established branch at Bishop's Waltham, that brought the totals number of outlets to six. In the period 1990–2015 a further eight outlets were opened. The last of these, in Christchurch is the biggest so far and, being in Dorset, the first outside the county of Hampshire.

In 1982–83, Newlyn Mason Elliott served as President of the Builders' Merchants Federation. Subsequently, he served in other important capacities before, in May 1985, he stepped down as managing director. He was succeeded by his son, Stuart Mason Elliott.86 However, Newlyn Mason Elliott continued as chairman until his death on 28 May 2007.

On 29 September 2014, Elliotts acquired Hardleys, the Lymington kitchen and bathroom showroom. There were no redundancies and, after the takeover, the business carried on as before.

At the awards meeting of Family Business United held in London on 11 June 2015, Elliott Brothers was named the Property and Construction Family Business of the Year. (Note: Builders' Merchants News, 16 June 2015)

As of 2015, the managing director of the holding company, Elliott Brothers (Builders Merchants) Ltd, is Stuart Graham Mason Elliott. Managing director of the operating company, Elliott Brothers Ltd, is Thomas Edward Mason Elliott. The company employs almost 300 people at their 13 locations in Hampshire and Dorset. In 2014 the holding company, Elliott Brothers (Builders Merchants) Limited, returned assets of £31.2M and liabilities of £15.1M. (Note: Information received by email from the company.)

== Blanchards ==
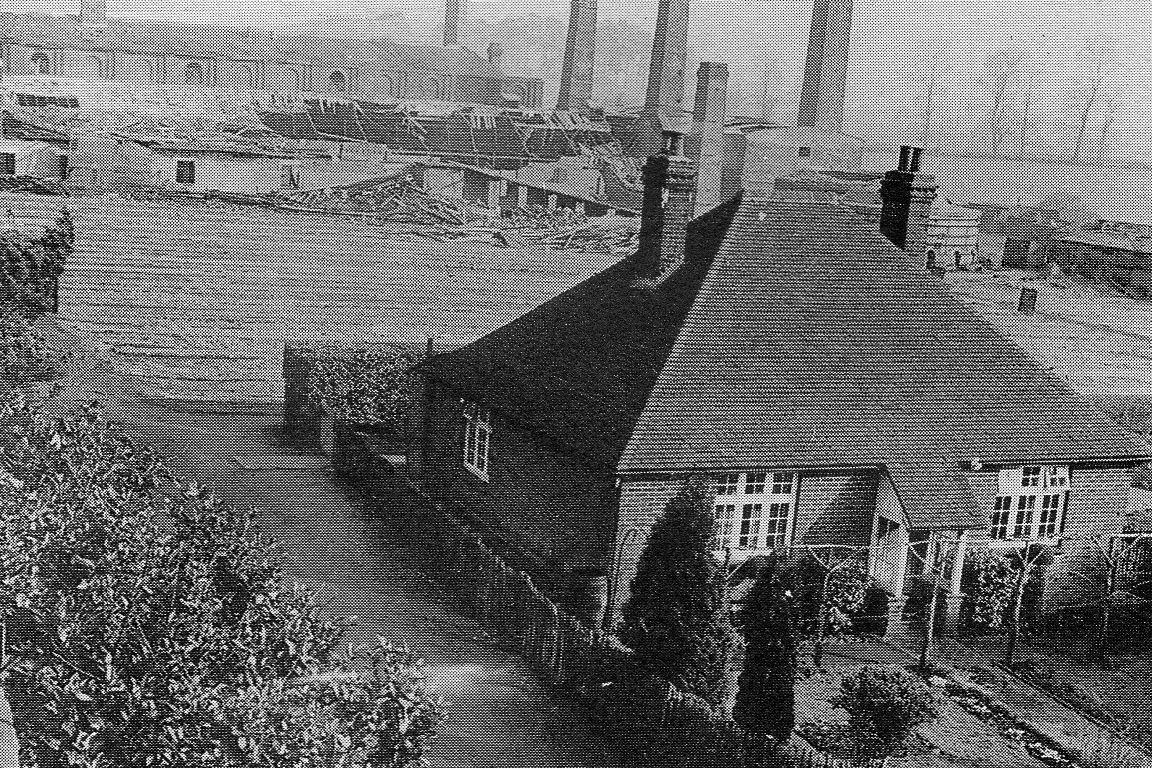
Blanchards after bomb damage

Brick building at Bishop's Waltham dates back to the 1860s. The founder, Mark Blanchard, had died in 1892 and his son, also named Mark, took over the business. However, by 1818, he decided to retire and, as he there was no successor in the family, he decided to sell the business. Elliotts paid £8,000 for the brickworks, stock and railway sidings. A new company was formed with Walter Elliott as managing director. The works were extended and equipment was renewed where necessary. Amongst other local buildings, the bricks were used for extensions to Southampton University College, the institution that was to become the University of Southampton in 1952. On the death of Walter Elliot in 1935, his nephew, Mason Elliott became chairman. During a bombing raid in the summer of 1941 the works were extensively damaged. The raid halted brick-making operations and it was not until 1947 that production was resumed. However, even by 1956 production was uneconomic with an annual output of only 1,500,000 bricks and 650,000 tiles. The site was therefore put up for auction but, there being no acceptable offers, it was withdrawn and, after redevelopment, became Elliotts' first branch sales and distribution depot. It served in this capacity until the early 1980s when Elliotts purchased the Claylands Road, Bishop's Waltham depot of Ben Turner & Son. Turners were a supplier of agricultural machinery. Their premises still serves as the Bishop's Waltham branch of Elliott Brothers.

== Military service by the Elliott family ==
When, in 1859, there was a fear of a French invasion, Thomas Elliott became an officer of the 2nd (Southampton) Hampshire Rifle Volunteers, a battalion of the Royal Hampshire Regiment. His son, water, served in the same regiment from 1881 to 1912. At the outbreak of WWI, he founded and commanded the Southampton unit of the Volunteer Defence Corps.

Several of Thomas's descendants gave voluntary military service in units that became part of the Territorial Army after its formation in 1907.

Mason Elliott joined the Hampshires in 1908 and transferred to the Hampshire Royal Horse Artillery on its formation in 1910. He was commissioned in 1912 and served in Egypt and Palestine throughout the war rising to the rank of major. He was awarded the DSO in 1918. After the war he joined the Hampshire Yeomanry, a unit of the Territorials. Rising to the rank of brigadier, in 1937, he took charge of the 72nd (Hampshire) Anti-Aircraft Brigade a unit of the 35th Anti-Aircraft Brigade (United Kingdom). He remained in command throughout WWII and was awarded a DSO and OBE in recognition of his long and distinguished service.

During World War I, Mason's younger brother, Christopher, served in India, Mesopotamia and on the Western front. Between the wars he served in the Hampshire Regiment and, in 1935, rose to the rank of colonel.

Mason's eldest son, Graham Mason Elliott, served in the Hampshire Regiment during World War II. As a platoon commander he landed with them at Arromanches on D-day, was wounded, evacuated and subsequently died.
