= The Alexandra, Birmingham =

Theatre in Birmingham, England

The Alexandra
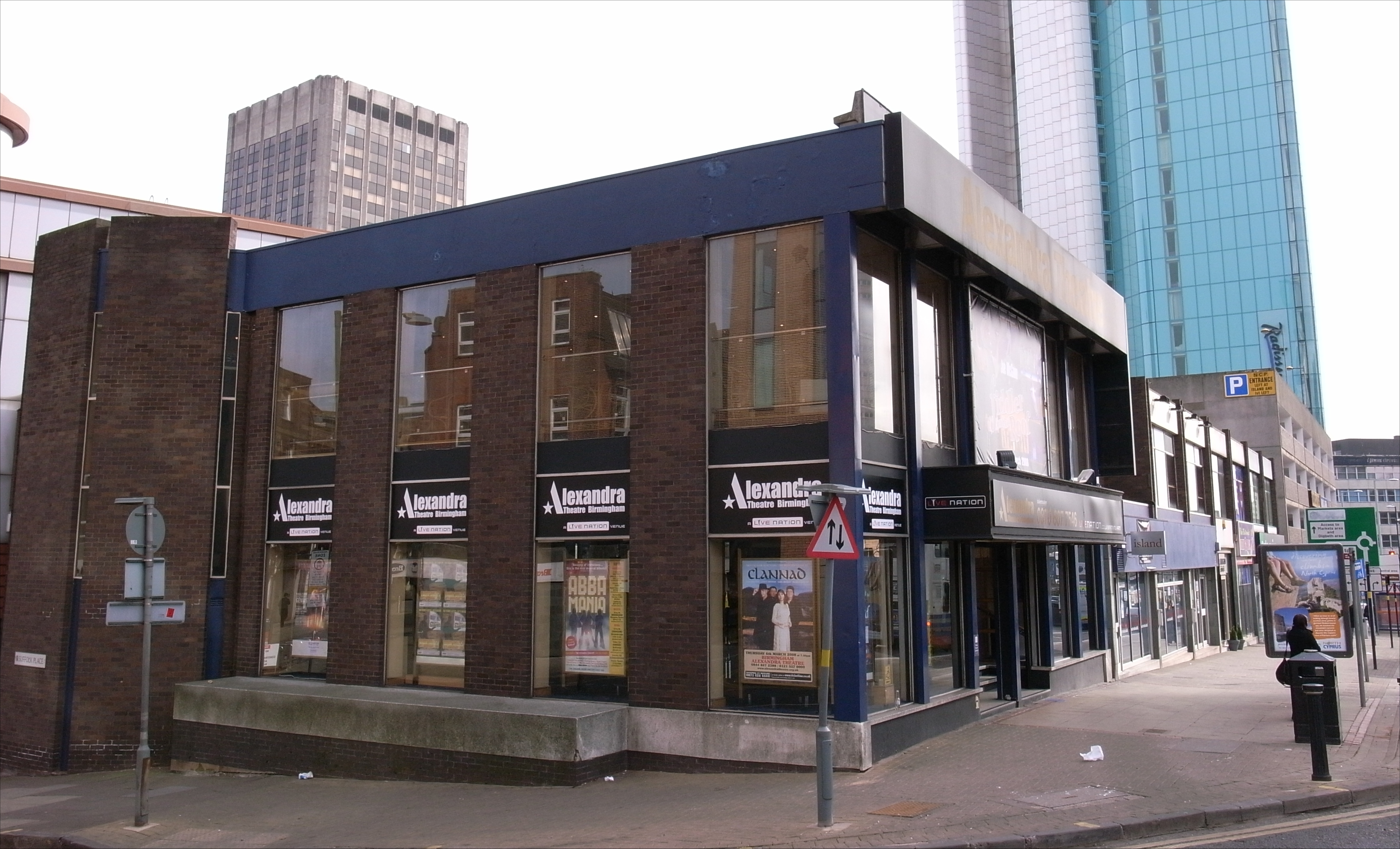
- Interactive map of The Alexandra
- Former names: Lyceum Theatre (1901–1902); Alexandra Theatre (1902–2010); New Alexandra Theatre (2010–2018)
- Address: Suffolk Queensway; Birmingham; England
- Coordinates: 52.476264°N 1.900683°W
- Owner: Ambassador Theatre Group
- Capacity: 1,347

Construction
- Opened: 27 May 1901
- Years active: 1901-present
- Architects: Owen & Ward (1900), Roland Satchwell (1935), John Madin Design Group (1967), Seymour Harris Partnership (1992)

Website
- Official Website

The Alexandra, commonly known as the Alex, is a theatre on Suffolk Queensway in Birmingham, England.

== History ==
=== 1900–1910 The Lester Collingwood years ===
Construction of the theatre commenced in 1900 and was completed in 1901. The architects were Owen & Ward and the theatre was opened on 27 May 1901 as the Lyceum Theatre on John Bright Street. Initially it attracted few theatre goers and it was decided to bring in a star. For ten weeks from the middle of June 1901 Harry Arthur Saintsbury trod the boards as the theatre's leading man, playing in costume dramas.

As a result of disappointingly low returns the new theatre was sold to Lester Collingwood for £4,000, who renamed it the Alexandra Theatre on 22 December 1902.

=== 1911–1977 The Salbergs years ===
Collingwood was killed in a road traffic accident in 1910 and was succeeded by Leon Salberg. The Salberg family ran the theatre from 1911 to 1977. Under Leon Salberg, the Alex was famous for its pantomimes such as Mother Goose. The theatre was rebuilt with a fine Art Deco auditorium in 1935 to a design by Roland Satchwell.

Leon Salberg died in his office at the theatre in 1938 and his son Derek took over the running of the theatre. Leon's ghost is said to inhabit the theatre. Other ghostly sightings include that by a cleaner of a woman dressed in grey in 1987.

Following World War II, the theatre became well patronised by the local population - in 1950 85% of season ticket holders lived within the boundaries of Birmingham.

Although the main entrance was originally situated on John Bright Street, a new main entrance block was built on Suffolk Street between 1967–1969 to a design by the John Madin Design Group, with a wide bridge linking the two - from the inside, the appearance is that of a single building.

In 1978, Derek Salberg published his autobiography, My Love Affair with a Theatre, with a foreword written by Laurence Olivier.

=== Recent history ===
The theatre currently seats 1,371 and hosts a busy programme of touring drama, West End shows and stand-up comedy. It was the home of the D'Oyly Carte Opera Company between 1990 and 1997.

Satchwell's interior was refurbished in 1992 by the Seymour Harris Partnership. The Alex was sold to Apollo Leisure in the 1990s.

On 7 August 1995, the then Alexandra Theatre was taken over by the multi-national organisation the Apollo Leisure Group. The new owners who ran many West End theatres brought many large scale West End productions to the Alex including Copacabana, Great Expectations, Grease and Summer Holiday starring Darren Day. A critically acclaimed production of West Side Story transferred to the West End for a successful run.

Under the ownership of Apollo Leisure, the Alex saw major investment including improvements to the stage area and front of house areas, this then enabled the theatre to stage first-rate productions including two productions from Cameron Mackintosh; Oliver! starring Gary Wilmot, and Les Misérables - the first productions to try out the new facilities. The theatre also presented the world premiere of Leslie Bricusse's Scrooge: The Musical starring Anthony Newley in November 1992.

In 1999 the Apollo Leisure Group was bought by American entertainment company SFX Entertainment for around £160 million. Under SFX management the theatre saw increased entertainment value, still welcoming West End productions such as Doctor Dolittle, and in Christmas 2000 saw the return of pantomime to the theatre (during the Birmingham Hippodrome redevelopment), with a sell out season of Peter Pan starring Leslie Grantham and Joe Pasquale.

In 2001, SFX merged with Clear Channel Entertainment, making them the largest UK theatre operator, including three West End theatres. Under the ownership of Clear Channel the theatre continued to provide and attract a range of entertainment, including musicals, comedy, plays, opera and concerts.

Comedians including Stewart Lee, Seann Walsh, Jack Dee and Micky Flanagan have all performed at the theatre in recent years. Birmingham-born comedian Joe Lycett filmed his More, More, More! How Do You Lycett? How Do You Lycett? tour at the theatre in October 2022, having previously worked as an usher selling ice creams. Mentalist and illusionist Derren Brown regularly performs at the theatre with his UK tours.

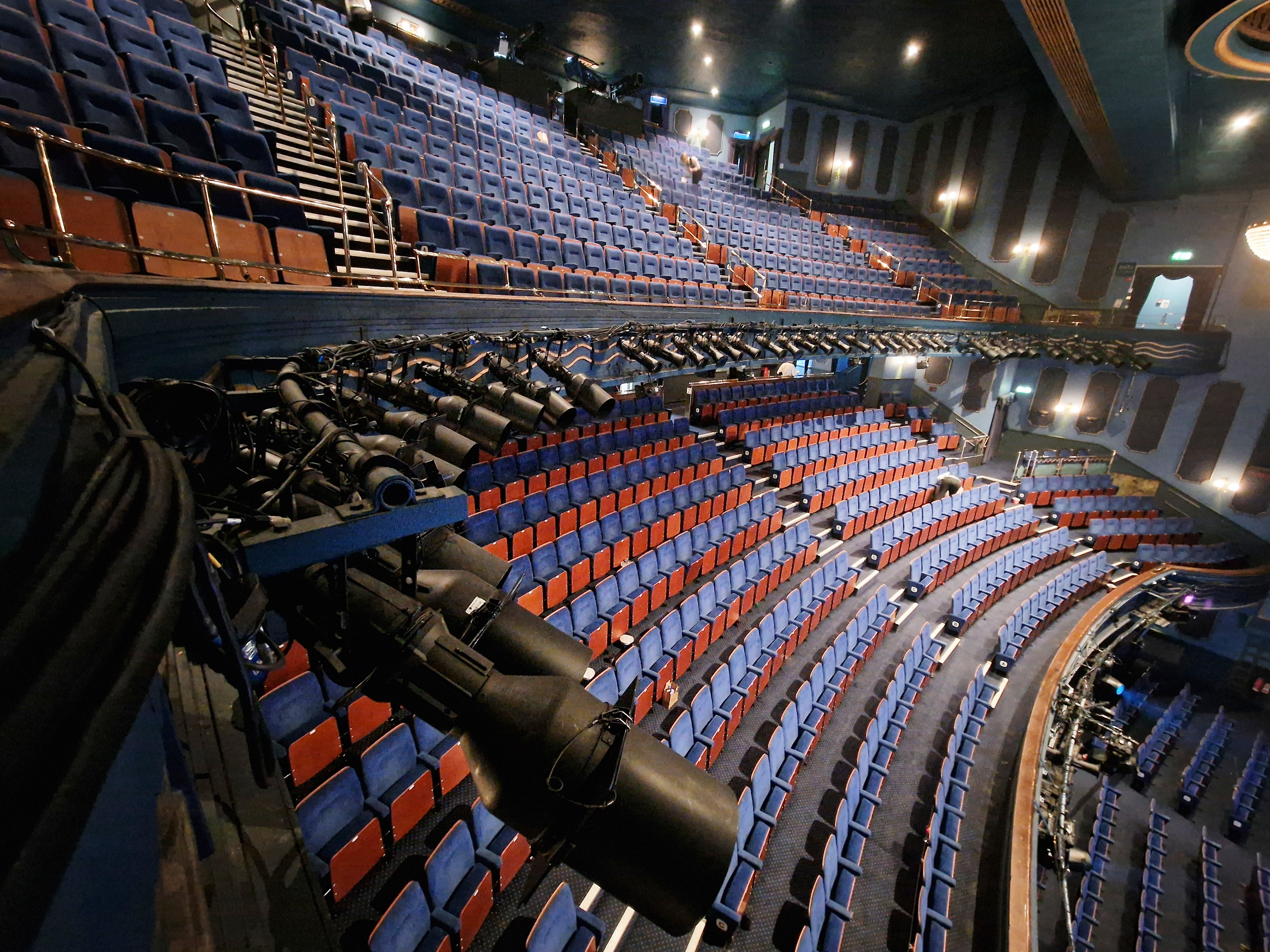
Auditorium of The Alexandra, Birmingham, in December 2024, during the run of Book of Mormon - John Slater

In January 2006 the Alexandra Theatre changed management once again, to be managed by Live Nation, a company that specialised in concert promotion and large venue operations. It is now owned by the Ambassador Theatre Group, and after a minor refurbishment the group renamed the theatre the New Alexandra Theatre.

Westlife lead vocalist Shane Filan played at the theatre as a solo artist in 2017.

On 17 September 2018, the theatre was relaunched as The Alexandra following a £650,000 refurbishment and corporate re-brand to the venue which was unveiled in October 2018 for the opening of the Motown The Musical UK tour.

Following the closure of theatres due to the COVID-19 pandemic from March 2020, the theatre reopened in July 2021 in its 120th year with Strictly Come Dancing's Anton & Giovanni.

In November 2024, the theatre presented the world premiere of Here & Now, a jukebox musical based on the songs of the pop group Steps who made a special appearance at the gala night during the Finale Megamix.

=== Notable events ===
Neville Chamberlain delivered a speech at the theatre on 13 October 1918.

Dad's Army star Arthur Lowe collapsed because of a stroke in his dressing room in the theatre before a performance of Home at Seven, and later died in hospital on 15 April 1982 aged 66.
