= Party on the Dancefloor =

2018 live album by Steps

Live album by Steps
- Released: 8 June 2018
- Genre: Pop
- Length: 113:53
- Label: LiveHereNow

Steps chronology
Tears on the Dancefloor: Crying at the Disco (2017)	Party on the Dancefloor (2018)	What the Future Holds (2020)

Party on the Dancefloor is the fourth live album by the British pop group Steps, released in June 2018. The album was recorded during the band's 2017 Party on the Dancefloor Tour.

== Track listing ==
1. "Scared of the Dark" – 7:34
2. "Deeper Shade of Blue" – 4:20
3. "Chain Reaction" – 4:31
4. "Happy" – 3:38
5. "Stomp" 7:13
6. "Better Best Forgotten" / "Last Thing on My Mind" (Medley) – 6:01
7. "No More Tears (Enough Is Enough)" / "No More Tears on the Dancefloor" (Medley) – 5:48
8. "Dancing with a Broken Heart" – 4:41
9. "When I Said Goodbye" – 4:14
10. "5,6,7,8" – 6:42
11. "Better the Devil You Know" – 5:34
12. "It's the Way You Make Me Feel" – 7:03
13. "Heartbeat" – 6:05
14. "Story of a Heart" – 3:55
15. "Summer of Love" / "Paradise Lost" / "Despacito" (Medley) – 5:54
16. "Neon Blue" – 5:59
17. "Love U More" / "You'll Be Sorry" / "After the Love Has Gone" / "Love's Got a Hold on My Heart" (Medley) – 9:46
18. "One for Sorrow" – 6:33
19. "Tragedy" – 8:22

== Charts ==
Chart (2018)	Peak position
Scottish Albums (Official Charts)	12
UK Albums (Official Charts)	18
UK Album Downloads (Official Charts)	40
UK Independent Albums (Official Charts)	3

== Release history ==
Region	Date	Format	Version	Label	Ref	Catalogue
worldwide	8 June 2018	CD; Digital Download; Streaming	Standard	LiveHereNow		LHN035CDR
