= Dancing with a Broken Heart =

2012 single by Delta Goodrem

Single by Delta Goodrem

from the album Child of the Universe
- B-side: "Waiting for Forever"
- Released: 10 August 2012
- Recorded: 2011–2012
- Genre: Synthpop
- Length: 3:52
- Label: Sony
- Songwriters: Delta Goodrem; Vince Pizzinga; John Shanks
- Producer: John Shanks

Delta Goodrem singles chronology
| "Sitting on Top of the World" (2012) | "Dancing with a Broken Heart" (2012) | "Wish You Were Here" (2012) |

Music video
- "Dancing with a Broken Heart" on YouTube

"Dancing with a Broken Heart" is a song by Australian singer–songwriter Delta Goodrem. It was sent to Australian radio on 26 July 2012 and was released physically and digitally on 10 August 2012. The song is the second single released from Goodrem's fourth studio album Child of the Universe. It debuted on the ARIA Charts at number 15, but only stayed in the top 50 for three weeks. It received mixed to positive reviews.

== Background and composition ==
"Dancing with a Broken Heart" was released three months after Goodrem had major success with "Sitting on Top of the World" debuted and peaked at number two on the ARIA Charts, being held off the top spot by Carly Rae Jepsen's "Call Me Maybe". The song is about evolving after removing yourself for a bad situation, for your soul or spirit, making a big move, in leaving it, and becoming a better person from the experience, like in the lyrics "I'm gonna bury all the past just six feet under, under/I'm gonna make a storm from lightning and thunder, thunder/I won't let dogs lie in the peace and quiet/Moving on to another time." The song was written by Goodrem and Vince Pizzinga, and produced by John Shanks. The song has heavy EDM guitar elements and is very pop.

== Promotion ==
=== Live performances ===
Goodrem performed the song live on the Today show on 22 August 2012. She also did two instore performances to promote the single. The first was in Adelaide on 10 August and one in Perth on 12 August with crowds of over 3,000 people at both. Goodrem appeared on many radio stations around the country and on some occasions performing Dancing with a Broken Heart.

=== Music video ===
The music video, directed by Hannah Lux Davis was filmed at Los Angeles on July 2012 and was released on August 17, 2012. The video features people who have had situations that are heartbreaking which include an Olympian whose heart is broken because of an injury, parents who have lost their child and a marriage proposal which fell through. It also features Goodrem dancing around on different backdrops and singing to the camera, including dancing in water under the stars with a Mythology element of the Goddess "Hecate". There are also moments in the music video devoted to the fact that she is an artist and heals people through "Touching" them with her art.

== Track listings ==
- CD single / digital download
1. "Dancing with a Broken Heart" – 3:52
- Limited edition CD single / digital EP
1. "Dancing with a Broken Heart" – 3:52
2. "Waiting for Forever" – 3:37
3. "Dancing with a Broken Heart" (Acoustic) – 3:57

== Charts ==
| Chart (2012) | Peak Position |
|---|---|
| Australia (ARIA) | 15 |

== Certifications ==
| Region | Certification | Certified units/sales |
|---|---|---|
| Australia (ARIA) | Gold | 35,000^{‡} |
^{‡} Sales+streaming figures based on certification alone.

== Release history ==
| Country | Date | Label | Format |
|---|---|---|---|
| Australia | 26 July 2012 | Sony Music Australia | Airplay |
| Australia | 10 August 2012 | Sony Music Australia | CD single, digital download |
| New Zealand | 10 August 2012 | Sony Music Australia | Digital download |

== Steps version ==
"Dancing with a Broken Heart"

Single by Steps

from the album Tears on the Dancefloor: Crying at the Disco
- Released: 19 September 2017
- Length: 3:29
- Label: Steps Music; Fascination; Absolute
- Songwriters: Delta Goodrem; Vince Pizzinga; John Shanks
- Producer: The Alias

Steps singles chronology
| "Neon Blue" (2017) | "Dancing with a Broken Heart" (2017) | "What the Future Holds" (2020) |

Music video
- "Dancing with a Broken Heart" on YouTube

British group Steps recorded a cover of "Dancing with a Broken Heart" for Tears on the Dancefloor: Crying at the Disco, the re-release of their fifth studio album Tears on the Dancefloor (2017). Originally performed by Delta Goodrem and co-written by Goodrem, Vince Pizzinga and John Shanks, it was produced for Steps by The Alias. "Dancing with a Broken Heart" was released as the first single from the re-issue and the fourth single overall from the two albums.

=== Background and release ===
Following their reunion performance at G-A-Y on New Year's Eve of 2016 to celebrate their twentieth anniversary, Steps announced that their fifth studio album Tears on the Dancefloor would be released in April 2017 and its supporting concert tour, the Party on the Dancefloor Tour, would take place in November and December later that year. The album, which peaked at number-two on the UK Albums Chart and number-one on the UK Independent Albums Chart, generated three singles: "Scared of the Dark", "Story of a Heart" and "Neon Blue". On 18 September 2017, Steps announced that the album, titled Tears on the Dancefloor: Crying at the Disco, would be reissued on 27 October with five new songs, as well as three previously unreleased remixes for "Happy", "Glitter & Gold" and "I Will Love Again" from the original track listing. The following day, the group announced that "Dancing with a Broken Heart", a cover originally performed by Australian singer and songwriter Delta Goodrem, would be released as the lead single from the reissue.

In an interview with Rob Copsey for the Official Charts Company, band member Faye Tozer revealed that some of the new songs had originally been recorded for Tears on the Dancefloor but were ultimately not included, but confirmed "Dancing with a Broken Heart" had been chosen and recorded specifically for Tears on the Dancefloor: Crying at the Disco. She went on to say that the song stood out for her personally and felt that it, along with the other deluxe material, felt "cooler" than the original track listing.

Originally co-written by Goodrem, Vince Pizzinga and John Shanks and produced for Steps by The Alias, "Dancing with a Broken Heart" appears as the first song on the track listing of the reissue, while a radio mix produced by 7th Heaven is included as the seventeenth song on the digital bonus track edition of the album. Steps premiered the song on BBC Radio 2's The Ken Bruce Show on 19 September 2017, the day after the reissue was announced, and it was released that day. On 6 October 2017, a five-track EP containing the video mix, a radio mix and club mix by 7th Heaven and a radio mix and club mix by Nathan Jain was released.

=== Composition ===
The first song on the track list of the reissued album, "Dancing with a Broken Heart" lasts for a duration of three minutes and 29 seconds. Steps' cover of the song is inspired by disco and differs musically to the original dance performed by Goodrem. The majority of the vocals are sung by the members Claire Richards, Faye Tozer, Lisa Scott-Lee and Ian "H" Watkins over a "dazzling production", while Lee Latchford-Evans sings what Lucas Villa of AXS described as a "Daft Punk-like moment" during the latter half of the song. It's noted for its similarities to their 2000 single Deeper Shade of Blue, with its official music video again showing a darker side to the band.

=== Critical reception ===
AXS writer Lucas Villa praised the band's cover of "Dancing with a Broken Heart" for "[bringing] the melodrama and haunting melodies to the dance floor," and added that the female members "charge of their heartache and channel it into passionate performances."

=== Formats and track listings ===
Digital download – Tears on the Dancefloor: Crying at the Disco

1. "Dancing with a Broken Heart" – 3:29
17. "Dancing with a Broken Heart" (7th Heaven Radio Mix) – 3:29

Dancing with a Broken Heart (Remixes) – EP

1. "Dancing with a Broken Heart" (Video Mix) – 3:37
2. "Dancing with a Broken Heart" (7th Heaven Radio Edit) – 3:28
3. "Dancing with a Broken Heart" (Nathan Jain Radio Edit) – 2:33
4. "Dancing with a Broken Heart" (7th Heaven Club Mix) – 5:52
5. "Dancing with a Broken Heart" (Nathan Jain Club Mix) – 3:36

Tears on the Dancefloor – The Singles Collection (4-CD Box Set)

Dancing with a Broken Heart

1. "Dancing with a Broken Heart" – 3.29
2. "Dancing with a Broken Heart" (Video Mix) – 3.37
3. "Dancing with a Broken Heart" (7th Heaven Club Mix) – 5.53
4. "Dancing with a Broken Heart" (7th Heaven Radio Mix) – 3.29
5. "Dancing with a Broken Heart" (Nathan Jain Club Mix) – 3.37
6. "Dancing with a Broken Heart" (Nathan Jain Radio Edit) – 2.33
7. "Dancing with a Broken Heart" (Nathan Jain Dub) – 3.45
8. "Space Between Us" (Club Junkies Radio Mix)
9. "Space Between Us" (Club Junkies Club Mix)
10. "Beautiful Battlefield" (Gordon Pogoda Dance Remix)

=== Personnel ===
- Lead vocals – Faye Tozer, Claire Richards, Lisa Scott-Lee, Ian "H" Watkins
- Background vocals – Lee Latchford Evans

=== Charts ===
| Chart (2017) | Peak position |
|---|---|
| Scottish Singles Sales (Official Charts) | 58 |
| UK Singles Downloads (Official Charts) | 58 |
