= My Wildest Dreams (album) =

Studio album by Claire Richards
- Released: 1 February 2019
- Studio: Chestnut; Sarm Music Village; Angel; Tile Yard; Well Done; Kingstreet; Daniel Davidsen
- Genre: Pop
- Length: 53.09
- Label: Sony
- Producer: Steve Anderson; Michael Angelo; Jez Ashurst; Eric Bazilian; Cutfather; Ash Howes; Oliver Jacobs; Tim Larsson; Tobias Lundgren; P&D; Richard "Biff" Stannard; Chris Wahle

Claire Richards chronology
My Wildest Dreams (2019)	Euphoria (2023)

Singles from My Wildest Dreams
- 1. "On My Own" Released: 6 August 2018; 2. "End Before We Start" Released: 21 September 2018; 3. "My Heart Is Heading Home (This Christmas)" Released: 23 November 2018; 4. "Shame On You" Released: 4 January 2019; 5. "7 Billion" Released: 30 March 2019

My Wildest Dreams is the debut studio album by English singer-songwriter Claire Richards, released on 1 February 2019, through Sony Music Entertainment. The album was preceded by three singles; "On My Own", "End Before We Start", "Shame On You" and one promotional single, "Deep Waters".

== Background and release ==
In July 2015, the singer released an acoustic version of "One for Sorrow". The acoustic version of the track was recorded for an event honouring Steps' producer Pete Waterman. The track was arranged and produced by Steve Anderson with whom Claire was working on her debut album. On 5 September 2015, Richards released a solo version of "Deeper Shade of Blue" which she announced via her Facebook page. On 1 January 2017, Richards once again reunited with Steps in a performance at G-A-Y on New Year's Eve to celebrate twenty years since their debut. On 6 March 2017, Steps confirmed that their fifth studio album, Tears on the Dancefloor, would be released on 21 April 2017 in the United Kingdom and be preceded by the lead single, "Scared of the Dark", on 10 March; they also announced the Party on the Dancefloor Tour, which took place in November and December 2017. The album debuted at number two on the UK Albums Chart missing out on the top spot to Ed Sheeran's ÷ . On 27 October 2017, a reissue of the album, Tears on the Dancefloor: Crying at the Disco was released and peaked at number eight in the United Kingdom. The group embarked on their Summer of Steps tour in 2018.

On 4 August 2018, Richards announced the release of her debut single "On My Own" and unveiled the album cover. The album was available to pre-order on 6 August 2018 as the standard edition, deluxe edition, a personal limited signed edition and a My Wildest Dreams Boxset which includes a CD, signed postcard set and candle and revealed the album to be released on 2 November 2018. On 13 August 2018, "My Wildest Dreams Tour" was announced. On 8 October 2018, Richards announced on her official Facebook page that the album was pushed back with a new release date. The album is available in a standard edition and a deluxe edition that features three extra tracks.

== Singles ==
"On My Own" was released as the album's lead single on 6 August 2018. The music video was released on 10 August 2018. An acoustic version of the song was released on 24 August 2018 and a remix EP featuring six remixes was released 31 August 2018 to promote the single further.

"End Before We Start" was released as the album's second single on 21 September 2018. The music video was released on 1 October 2018. A remix EP featuring two remixes was released on 5 October 2018.

"My Heart Is Heading Home (This Christmas)" was released alongside a remix EP on 23 November 2018. It peaked on the UK iTunes chart at number 68. It featured only on the deluxe version of the album.

The third official single from the album, "Shame On You" was released alongside the video for the song on 4 January 2019. "7 Billion" was released in March 2019 as the final single.

=== Other songs ===
"Deep Waters" was released as an instant gratification track on 7 September 2018.

== Track listing ==
Standard edition
No.	Title	Writer(s)	Producer(s)	Length
1.	"On My Own"	Oliver Jacobs; Aidan Martin; Ricardo Hindes; Laurell Barker	Jacobs; Steve Anderson^{[a]}	3:25
2.	"End Before We Start"	Emma Rohan; Steve Anderson; Bianca Claxton	Anderson	3:29
3.	"7 Billion"	Ayak Thiik; Michael Angelo; Grace Tither; Aimee Parfitt	Angelo	3:25
4.	"These Wings"	Johan Fransson; Tim Larsson; Tobias Lundgren; Audra Mae Butts	Larsson; Lundgren	3:38
5.	"Deep Waters"	Andreas Öhrn; Chris Wahle; Leonie Burger	Wahle; Anderson^{[v]}	3:46
6.	"Liar"	Agrin Rahmani; Lotta Lindgren	Wahle; Jeremy Murphy^{[a]}; Anderson^{[v]}	4:05
7.	"Brave"	Jez Ashurst; Claire Richards; Rachel Furner	Ashurst; Anderson^{[c]}	3:55
8.	"Shame on You"	Daniel Davidsen; Peter Wallevik; Mich Hansen; Karen Harding; Chelcee Grimes	Cutfather; P&D; The Collab^{[v]}	3:33
9.	"Ruins"	Ash Howes; Richard "Biff" Stannard; Sam Preston; Furner	Howes; Stannard	3:40
10.	"My Wildest Dreams"	Anderson; Fiona Bevan	Anderson	3:51
11.	"For Now"	Peter Wright; Toby Lightman; Wes Hutchinson; Yacine Azeggagh	Ashurst	3:26
12.	"Don't Leave Me in This Love Alone"	Diane Warren	Anderson	4:08

Deluxe edition
No.	Title	Writer(s)	Producer(s)	Length
13.	"Forever Ends with You"	Anne Preven; Matt Rad; Felicia Barton	Rad; Anderson^{[v]}	3:54
14.	"If I Didn't Have You"	Amanda Marshall; Eric Bazilian; Andrew Kravitz	Bazilian; Märta Grauers^{[a]}; Arthur Jambazyan^{[a]}	4:10
15.	"My Heart Is Heading Home (This Christmas)"	Sharon Vaughn; Fransson; Larsson; Lundgren; John Reid	Larsson; Lundgren	4:45

Notes

- ^[a] signifies an additional producer
- ^[v] signifies a vocal producer
- ^[c] signifies a choir producer

== Personnel ==
Musicians

- Claire Richards – vocals
- Jeremy Wheatley – additional programming
- Adetoun Anibi – background vocals (tracks 1, 7)
- James Thompson – background vocals (tracks 1, 7)
- Sabrina Ramikie – background vocals (tracks 1, 7)
- Bruin Housley – drums (track 1)
- Oliver Jacobs – keyboards (track 1)
- Patrick McMahon – keyboards (track 1)
- Phillip Jacobs – keyboards (track 1)
- Ricardo Hindes – percussion (track 1)
- Cliff Masterson – orchestra conductor (tracks 2, 4, 6, 9, 11)
- The Royal Philharmonic Orchestra – orchestra (tracks 2, 4, 6, 9, 11)
- Steve Anderson – keyboards, piano, programming (tracks 2, 10, 12)
- Bianca Claxton – background vocals (track 2)
- Luke Fitton – guitar (track 2)
- Michael Angelo – bass, drums, keyboards, strings, synthesizer (track 3)
- Jürgen Goslich – guitar (track 3)
- Grace Tither – additional backing vocals (track 3)
- Clas Olofsson – acoustic guitar, electric guitar (tracks 4, 15)
- Chris Wahle – backing vocals, all instruments, programming (track 5)
- Leonie Burger – backing vocals (track 5)
- Rachel Furner – backing vocals (track 5)
- Samuel Tsang – additional programming (tracks 7, 11)
- Daniel Davidsen – bass, drum programming, guitar, keyboards, programming (track 8)
- Peter Wallevik – drum programming, keyboards, piano, programming (track 8)
- Mich Hansen – percussion (track 8)
- Johnny Sårde – additional percussion (track 8)
- Jez Ashurst – keyboards, programming (track 9)
- Ash Howes – programming (track 9)
- Louis Lion – additional programming (track 9)
- Matt Rad – backing vocals, guitar, keyboards, piano, programming (track 13)
- Felicia Barton – backing vocals (track 13)
- Eric Bazilian – bass, guitar, keyboards, piano (track 14)
- Ted Greenberg – drums (track 14)
- Mårta Grauers – keyboards, programming (track 14)

Technical

- Dick Beetham – mastering
- Jeremy Wheatley – mixing
- Steve Anderson – engineering (tracks 1, 5, 6, 13), strings arrangement (4, 9, 11, 12)
- Mat Bartram – engineering (tracks 2, 12)
- Michael Angelo – engineering (track 3)
- Eric Bazilian – engineering (track 14)
- Louis Lion – vocal engineering (track 9)
- Jeremy Murphy – strings engineering (track 6)
- Cliff Masterson – strings arrangement (tracks 4, 6, 9, 11, 12)
- Chris Wahle – strings arrangement (track 6)
- Mattias Bylund – strings arrangement (track 6)

== Charts ==
Chart (2019)	Peak position
Scottish Albums (OCC)	7
UK Albums (OCC)	9

== Release history ==
Region	Date	Format	Edition	Label	Ref.
United Kingdom	1 February 2019	CD; digital download; streaming	Standard; deluxe	Sony Music	
