= 5,6,7,8 =

1997 single by Steps

Single by Steps

from the album Step One
- B-side: "Words of Wisdom"
- Released: 10 November 1997
- Studio: PWL (London and Manchester, England)
- Genre: Techno-pop; country pop
- Length: 3:22
- Label: Jive; EBUL
- Songwriters: Barry Upton; Steve Crosby
- Producers: Karl Twigg; Mark Topham; Pete Waterman

Steps singles chronology
"5,6,7,8" (1997)	"Last Thing on My Mind" (1998)

Music video
- "5,6,7,8" on YouTube

"5,6,7,8" is a song by British group Steps from their debut studio album, Step One (1998). Written by Barry Upton and Steve Crosby and produced by Karl Twigg, Mark Topham and Pete Waterman, the song blends techno-pop and country pop styles. Released as their debut single in November 1997 by Jive and EBUL, it followed the group's formation, which came after each group member responded to a magazine advertisement seeking auditions for a pop band.

"5,6,7,8" peaked at number 14 on the UK Singles Chart (one of Steps' lowest chart positions) but has become the third-best-selling single of their career in the United Kingdom, selling 365,000 copies and receiving 3,440,000 streams as of March 2017. "5,6,7,8" peaked at number-one in Australia and reached the top five in Belgium and New Zealand. Its accompanying music video, directed by Phil Griffin, was shot on a beach in Spain and features the group driving quad bikes and dancing in a bar. "5,6,7,8" was performed on The Ultimate Tour in 2012, Party on the Dancefloor Tour in 2017 and What the Future Holds Tour in 2021.

== Background and release ==
Steps were put together in 1997 following an advert in The Stage magazine asking for applicants to audition for a place in a pop band. Out of the thousands who applied, Lee Latchford-Evans, Lisa Scott-Lee, Faye Tozer, Claire Richards and Ian "H" Watkins successfully secured a place in the band. Latchford-Evans performs the majority of the song, while Scott-Lee sings the middle 8, or bridge. It was recorded at PWL Studios in London and Manchester, England, and mixed by Lee Sharma at the same venue. Upton also arranged the track and played the guitar, while the banjo, violin, drums and keyboards were played by Sean Lyon, Chris Haigh, Chris McDonnell and Twigg, respectively.

Al Unsworth and Bradlee Spreadborough served as the assistant engineers and it was mastered at Transfermation Studios in London, England. "5,6,7,8" features all of the band members on lead vocals except for Ian "H" Watkins, who only performs background vocals. Various versions of the song were included on the CD single in the United Kingdom, Europe and Japan, including an extended version, an instrumental and a remix by W.I.P.; the CD single in the United Kingdom and Europe also included the B-side, "Words of Wisdom", also written by Upton and Crosby. It was released in the United Kingdom in November 1997, and it was later included on their first greatest hits album, Gold: Greatest Hits (2001), the W.I.P. remix on their first compilation album The Last Dance (2002) and their second greatest hits album, The Ultimate Collection (2011).

== Reception ==
=== Critical reception ===
Retrospectively, Lucas Villa from AXS stated that "5,6,7,8" "was the beginning of Steps' campy, feel good sounds." Upon the release, Andy Coleman from Birmingham Evening Mail described it as a "line dancing ditty". Gary James from Entertainment Focus noted that the song "stands out from the rest of their catalogue for being somewhat a novelty single." He added, "It's blend of country, techno and pop had us reaching for our lassos and thinking perhaps Rednex had returned with a 'Cotton Eyed Joe' for 1997." Sophie McCoid from Liverpool Echo named it an "epic tune". Mark Beaumont from NME described it as a "more traditional hoedown". Peter Robinson of NME gave the song a negative review in 2001. In his review of Gold: Greatest Hits, he wrote "Steps were only signed for one single – with good reason, for '5,6,7,8' was shit of the very highest order." Similarly, Digital Spy writer Robert Copsey wrote that retrospectively, the track was a "bizarre" choice of lead single in his review of The Ultimate Collection in 2011. In a review of Steps' best-selling songs for the Official Charts Company in March 2017, Copsey noted how "5,6,7,8" distinctly differs from the rest of their discography in terms of its techno-pop genre, line dancing lyrics and lack of lead vocals solely from Claire Richards.

=== Commercial reception ===
Commercially, "5,6,7,8" debuted at number 18 on the UK Singles Chart on 16 November 1997, and peaked at number 14 in its eighth week on 10 January 1998. It spent a further nine weeks on the chart from January through to March, and re-entered the chart for one week at number 100 on 18 April 1998. Altogether, "5,6,7,8" spent 18 non-consecutive weeks on the UK Singles Chart, 10 of which were in the top 20. Their first top 40 hit, "5,6,7,8" was the only song of the singles they released (prior to their initial split in late December 2001) not to chart within the top 10. By July 2012, it had become their fourth-best selling single in their career in the United Kingdom; but by March 2017 it had switched positions with one of their subsequent singles "Better Best Forgotten" to become their third-highest selling song, with sales of 365,000 copies, and is their most streamed track with 37,952,032 plays as of March 2021. It was certified platinum on 11 December 2020 for sales and streams exceeding 600,000. Copsey added that it is very rare for a pop band to be given a second opportunity to release more music following a top 20 debut.

== Music video ==
Set primarily on a beach in Marbella, Spain, the accompanying music video for "5,6,7,8", filmed on 9 September 1997 and directed by Phil Griffin, opens with Latchford-Evans and Watkins riding quad bikes along the beach while Scott-Lee, Tozer and Richards drive a car on the road next to them, with close-ups of each of the female singers performing the chorus outside bathroom stalls. It is followed by a repetition of the chorus during which all of the members perform the song's associated line dancing routine, which was very popular at the time of its release, to the music outside a bar on the beach, attracting a crowd of beachgoers. Latchford-Evans performs the first verse, with Watkins walking slightly behind him from the beach to the bar. Afterwards, the chorus and dance routine is once again repeated, during which Watkins and Richards pull two beachgoers out of the bar to dance with the group, which attracts other beachgoers to the group's performance. Latchford-Evans then performs the second verse while playing a game of snooker with Watkins while the ladies play table football nearby. For the final chorus, the group members, now wearing red and black outfits, perform the dance routine in front of a crowd for a final time; however, the setting has changed to night time and inside a Tiki bar.

== Promotion ==
"5,6,7,8" was included on the group's sixth concert tour, The Ultimate Tour, in 2012. Latchford-Evans stated in March 2017 that although the band does not like performing the song, they find new ways of performing it live as they know that it is a fan-favourite. It is also included on the set list of their eighth concert tour, the Party on the Dancefloor Tour.

== Formats and track listings ==
Album version – Step One

3. "5,6,7,8" – 3:22

CD single – UK, Europe, Australia

1. "5,6,7,8" (Radio edit) – 3:22
2. "5,6,7,8" (Extended version) – 4:03
3. "Words of Wisdom" – 3:52
4. "5,6,7,8" (Instrumental) – 2:52

CD single – Japan

1. "5,6,7,8" (Radio edit) – 3:22
2. "5,6,7,8" (W.I.P. remix) – 3:15
3. "5,6,7,8" (Extended version) – 4:03
4. "5,6,7,8" (Instrumental) – 2:52

== Credits and personnel ==
=== A-side: "5,6,7,8" ===
Credits are adapted from the liner notes of Step One and the liner notes of "5,6,7,8".

Recording

- Recorded at PWL Studios (London and Manchester, England)
- Mixed at PWL Studios (London and Manchester, England)
- Mastered at Transfermation (London, England)

Personnel

- Songwriting – Barry Upton, Steve Crosby
- Production – Mark Topham, Karl Twigg, Pete Waterman
- Arrangement – Barry Upton
- Mixing – Lee Sharma
- Engineering – Chris McDonnell
- Banjo – Sean Lyon
- Violin – Chris Haigh
- Drums – Chris McDonnell
- Guitars – Mark Topham, Barry Upton
- Keyboards – Karl Twigg

=== B-side: "Words of Wisdom" ===
Credits are adapted from the liner notes of "5,6,7,8".

Personnel

- Songwriting – Barry Upton, Steve Crosby
- Arrangement – Barry Upton

== Charts ==
=== Weekly charts ===
Weekly chart performance for "5,6,7,8"
Chart (1997–1998)	Peak position
Australia (ARIA)	1
Belgium (Ultratop 50 Flanders)	2
Europe (Eurochart Hot 100)	40
Netherlands (Dutch Top 40)	22
Netherlands (Single Top 100)	27
New Zealand (Recorded Music NZ)	2
Scottish Singles Sales (Official Charts)	9
Sweden (Sverigetopplistan)	17
UK Singles (Official Charts)	14
UK Independent (Official Charts)	1

=== Year-end charts ===
1997 year-end chart performance for "5,6,7,8"
Chart (1997)	Position
UK Singles (OCC)	90

1998 year-end chart performance for "5,6,7,8"
Chart (1998)	Position
Australia (ARIA)	15
Belgium (Ultratop 50 Flanders)	10
New Zealand (RIANZ)	30
UK Singles (OCC)	127

== Certifications ==
Certifications and sales for "5,6,7,8"
Region	Certification	Certified units/sales
Australia (ARIA)	Platinum	70,000^{^}
Belgium (BRMA)	Gold	25,000^{*}
New Zealand (RMNZ)	Gold	15,000^{‡}
United Kingdom (BPI)	Platinum	600,000^{‡}
^{*} Sales figures based on certification alone.^{^} Shipments figures based on certification alone.^{‡} Sales+streaming figures based on certification alone.
