= Neon Blue =

Single by Steps

from the album Tears on the Dancefloor
- Released: 4 August 2017
- Genre: Pop
- Length: 3:26
- Label: Steps Music; Fascination; Absolute
- Songwriters: Carl Ryden; Fiona Bevan; Scott Gausden
- Producers: The Alias; Carl Ryden

Steps singles chronology
"Story of a Heart" (2017)	"Neon Blue" (2017)	"Dancing with a Broken Heart" (2017)

Music videos
- "Neon Blue" on YouTube; "Neon Blue" (remix) on YouTube

"Neon Blue" is a song recorded by British group Steps for their fifth studio album, Tears on the Dancefloor (2017). Written by Carl Ryden and Fiona Bevan, it was announced as the third single from the album on 20 July 2017, and subsequently released on 4 August. Musically, it is a mid-tempo pop ballad which begins with a soft piano introduction and builds into an upbeat synth track, while lyrically, it is about encouraging a downcast friend to come out and have some fun. Band member Ian "H" Watkins described "Neon Blue" as a gay anthem due to its message of coming out. It garnered a positive response from music critics, with a general consensus that it is a classic Steps song. Its accompanying music video features a man and a woman who have had bad fortune in their relationships meeting at a party in a night club and their luck turning around. "Neon Blue" was included on the set list of their eighth headlining concert tour, the Party on the Dancefloor Tour (2017).

== Composition and release ==
"Neon Blue" was co-written by Carl Ryden and Fiona Bevan and produced by Ryden with The Alias for Steps fifth studio album, Tears on the Dancefloor (2017). It appears as the ninth song on the track listing, with a running time of three minutes, 26 seconds. It is a mid-tempo pop ballad which begins with a soft piano introduction which unfolds in an upbeat "euphoric" chorus backed by a piano and synths. Official Charts Company writer Justin Myers wrote that the song's introduction was reminiscent of the musical style of Coldplay, and also compared elements of it to "Collide" by Leona Lewis and Avicii (2011). Lyrically, the group sings about asking a downcast friend to join them on a night out and have some fun, which can be heard in the line "Come out, come out and dance with me/ If you're down it's a remedy." Band member Ian "H" Watkins considered the track to be a gay anthem owing to its message of coming out.

On 20 July 2017, the group announced the song as the third single from the album, and it was released in the form of two remixes – a radio edit and a club mix – produced by Adam Turner on 4 August. A radio edit and a club mix by 7th Heaven was later released on 11 August. On 18 September 2017, Steps announced that Tears on the Dancefloor would be reissued as a deluxe edition with new songs and accompanying remixes, titled Tears on the Dancefloor: Crying at the Disco. "Neon Blue" appears as the fourth track on the deluxe edition instead of the ninth, and the Adam Turner Radio Edit is included as the nineteenth track.

== Critical reception ==
The song was met with a positive response from critics. Matt Bagwell of The Huffington Post awarded the song five out of five stars in his track-by-track review of Tears on the Dancefloor in April 2017; he wrote that the piano introduction is reminiscent of the musical style on English singer Adele's third studio album 25 (2015), but noted that it soon evolves into "classic Steps. Or Kylie." He concluded by endorsing its release as a potential single. Shaun Kitchener of the Daily Express echoed Bagwell's notation of the down to up-tempo structure, and described the song as an "instant classic". AXS contributor Lucas Villa praised the track, writing that the song "shines as a true Steps classic with feel good lyrics that could light up the darkest room." In his review for the music video, Villa also wrote that the song is a "glowing ode to celebrating away the bad times" and the "perfect pop potion for fighting the blues."

== Music video ==
The treatment for the accompanying music video for "Neon Blue" was written by band member Lee Latchford-Evans, his girlfriend Kerry-Lucy Taylor and Steps' stylist Frank Strachan. Claire Richards and Latchford-Evans premiered a clip of the music video on This Morning on 11 August 2017 and it was released in full the same today. It begins with solo shots of each of the band members during the first verse sitting in a room with dust covers draped over various props. It is intercut with shots of a woman sitting at a table in a cafe who has been stood up. The barista looks over and hands her a leaflet to attend a party at a nightclub for people who are feeling downcast. At the same time, a man and woman are shown to be having an argument outside of the nightclub and it is premised that they break up. As the chorus begins, a dust cover is pulled off of a glitter ball and the room transforms into a lively club space whereby Steps are performing a dance routine along with club goers.

As the video progresses, the woman from the cafe and the man from the argument meet each other on the dancefloor, their luck having turned around, amongst the crowd of people enjoying themselves and dancing. The video ends with confetti and streamers flying around the night club as the band hug each other. Lucas Villa for AXS praised the video, writing that "the feel good hues of the song come through beautifully on the screen." Gay Times writer Daniel Megarry noted that the video contains everything fans of Steps would look for, writing "Disco balls? Check. Insanely catchy chorus? Check. Easy-to-learn choreography? Check. What more could you ask for?"

== Formats and track listings ==
Digital download – Adam Turner Remixes

1. "Neon Blue" (Adam Turner Radio Edit) – 4:05
2. "Neon Blue" (Adam Turner Club Mix) – 6:21

Digital download – 7th Heaven Remixes

1. "Neon Blue" (7th Heaven Radio Edit) – 3:37
2. "Neon Blue" (7th Heaven Club Mix) – 6:43

Remixes EP

1. "Neon Blue" (Adam Turner Radio Edit) – 4:05
2. "Neon Blue" (7th Heaven Radio Edit) – 3:37
3. "Neon Blue" (Adam Turner Club Mix) – 6:21
4. "Neon Blue" (7th Heaven Club Mix) – 6:43

Tears On The Dancefloor - The Singles Collection (4-CD Box Set)
CD3 - Neon Blue

1. "Neon Blue" (Radio Mix) – 3:26
2. "Neon Blue" (7th Heaven Club Mix) – 6:43
3. "Neon Blue" (7th Heaven Radio Edit) – 3:37
4. "Neon Blue" (Adam Turner Mix) – 6:21
5. "Neon Blue" (Adam Turner Radio Edit) – 4:05
6. "Neon Blue" (Adam Turner Dub Mix) – 6:22
7. "Happy" (Club Junkies Radio Edit) – 3:39
8. "Happy" (Club Junkies Club Mix) – 5:57
9. "I Will Love Again" (Porl Young Radio Edit) – 3:56
10. "I Will Love Again" (Porl Young Club Mix) – 7:57

== Credits and personnel ==
- Lead vocals – Faye Tozer, Claire Richards, Lisa Scott-Lee, Lee Latchford Evans, Ian "H" Watkins
- Songwriting – Carl Ryden, Fiona Bevan
- Production – The Alias, Carl Ryden
- Keyboards and programming – Julian Gingell, Barry Stone, Carl Ryden
- Mixing – Pete Hofmann

Credits adapted from the liner notes of Tears on the Dancefloor.

== Release history ==
Country	Date	Format	Version	Label	Ref.
Various	21 April 2017	Digital download; streaming; (as part of the Tears on the Dancefloor album)	Original	Steps Music LLP; Fascination; Absolute	
Various	4 August 2017	Digital download; streaming	Adam Turner Remixes	Steps Music LLP; Fascination; Absolute	
Various	11 August 2017	Digital download; streaming	7th Heaven Remixes	Steps Music LLP; Fascination; Absolute	
