= Fiona Bevan =

English singer-songwriter

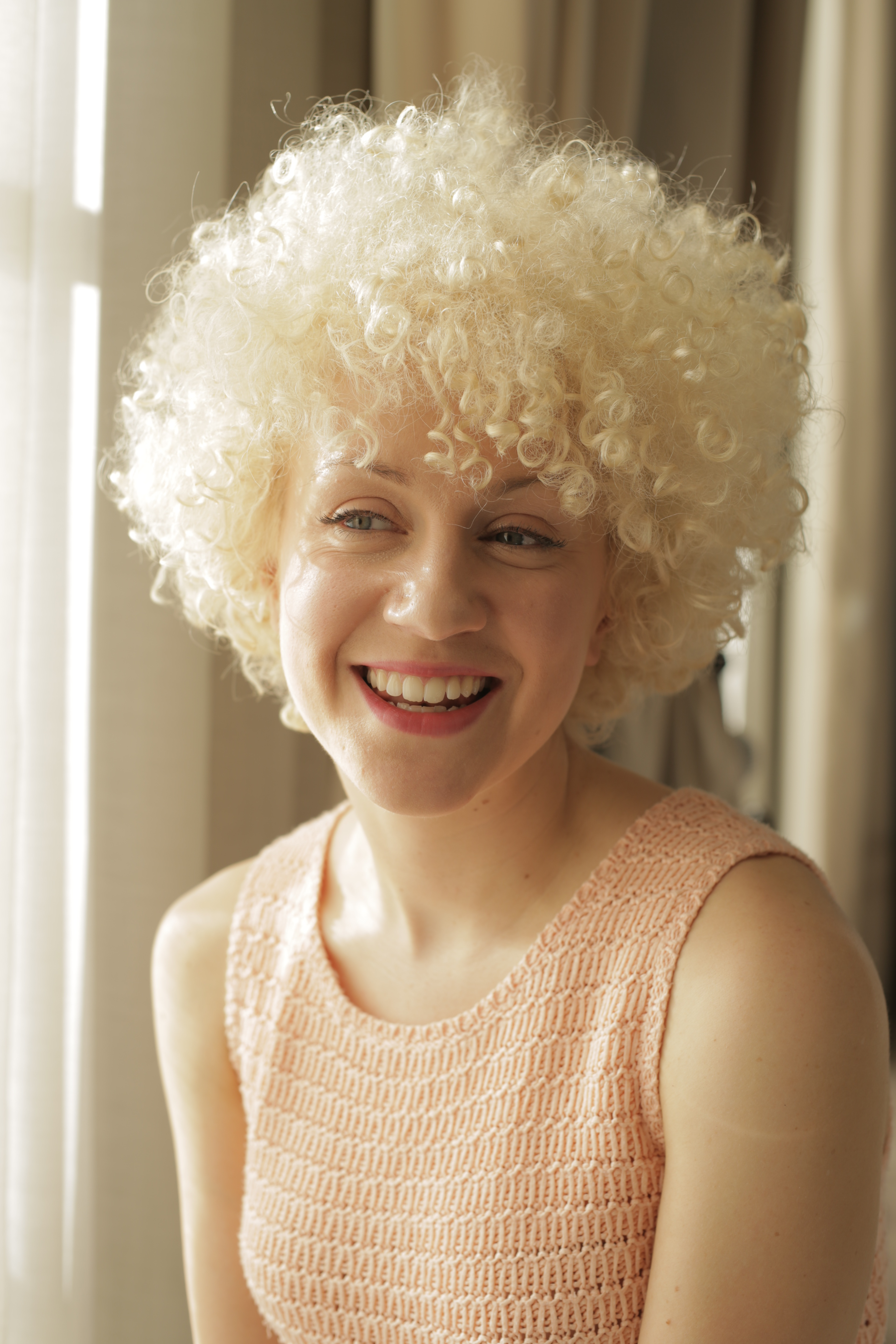

Background information
- Born: Fiona Mackay Barclay Bevan
- Origin: Suffolk, England
- Genres: Pop; folk; soul
- Occupation: Singer-songwriter
- Instruments: Vocals; guitar; piano
- Label: Navigator Records
- Website: fionabevan.co.uk

Fiona Mackay Barclay Bevan is an English singer-songwriter from Suffolk, England. She co-wrote the song "Little Things" for One Direction along with Ed Sheeran, which became a number-one single in 13 countries and received a BMI award.

Bevan has co-written songs released by Kylie Minogue, LIGHTS, 5 Seconds Of Summer, Tom Walker, Steps, Mika, Shane Filan, Hey Violet, and Natalie Imbruglia. She has also written and been featured on Stefflon Don's debut release.

As an artist, Bevan's debut solo studio album Talk to Strangers (April 2014) was released on Navigator Records. She has toured as a supporting act for Nick Mulvey, Ryan Keen, Ed Sheeran, Hawksley Workman, Ingrid Michaelson, Gwyneth Herbert, Luke Friend, and Bill Bailey. In 2014, Bevan completed a tour of Australia supporting Busby Marou, and the following year she toured Canada, supporting Hawksley Workman.

Bevan runs a residency night at Servant Jazz Quarters in Dalston, London, called "Fiona Bevan Presents", featuring acts including Mercury Prize-nominated Sam Lee and Ed Harcourt, who also remixed her first single, "The Machine", in 2014.

== Early life and education ==
Bevan is of British and Canadian parentage. Her great-grandmother was the romantic novelist D. E. Stevenson, and Treasure Island author Robert Louis Stevenson was her great-great-grandfather's cousin. She was born in Bury St. Edmunds in Suffolk, brought up in Suffolk, and attended Colchester County High School for Girls. Bevan studied English literature at university.

== Career ==
Fiona Bevan's debut extended play (EP), In The Swimming Pool, was released in 2007. Her debut studio album Plant Your Heart, was released in 2009 on the Fallen Idol label.

After graduating, Bevan briefly played guitar in the band Poussez Posse, fronted by Georgina Baillie, before deciding to start a solo project.

In 2011, she released an EP, Us and the Darkness, on Venus Climbing, co-produced with Robin Baynton. The EP featured Bevan on lead vocals and guitar, accompanied by Rosalie Bevan on bass and James Crichlow on violin. One of the songs on the EP, "Dial D for Denial", was a semi-finalist at the 2011 International Songwriting Competition. The song "Pirates and Diamonds" was included on the OneTaste Collective Album Vol. 2, released on 14 June 2010, while she also appeared on Winter Hunter Remixes by The Living Graham Bond released on 26 July 2010 on the Fat label.

Her song "Love in a Cold Climate" was included in the For Folk's Sake Christmas 2011 compilation album.

Bevan's second album, Talk To Strangers, was released in 2014 on Navigator Records in the UK, Planet Music in Australia, and P-Vine in Japan. In 2015, it was released on Convexe / Universal Music in Canada and Convexe in the USA. The album's twelve songs were written, arranged, and played by Fiona Bevan, produced and played by Shawn Lee, engineered by Pierre Duplan in Bloomsbury, London, and mastered by George Horn at Fantasy Studios, San Francisco. The Guardian wrote, "Bevan took us on startling odysseys that suggested Erykah Badu, Joanna Newsom, and Kate Bush spine-tinglingly joined". The Line of Best Fit called her work, "mesmerizingly beautiful".

The first single "The Machine" was remixed by Ed Harcourt and featured Fem Fel, which received airplay on BBC Radio 1 and BBC London. Clash Music commentated about the track: "Fiona Bevan contrasts pastoral, acoustic textures with her golden, golden voice".

The next single, "Rebel Without a Cause", was released in May 2014, with remixes by Anushka, who was signed to Gilles Peterson's Brownswood Recordings, and Mr. Hudson.

The single "They Sang Silent Night" was released in 2014 as a peacetime/Christmas song, marking the 100th anniversary of the Christmas Truce ceasefire when enemy troops united in peace to sing "Silent Night" across the trenches. A live version of the song aired on Christmas Day on national ABC radio in Australia, featuring Fiona accompanied by Jeremy Marou from Busby Marou on guitar.

In December 2016, Bevan co-wrote and featured on the song 'Forever' on Stefflon Don's mix-tape Real Ting.

In February 2017, the British newspaper The Observer identified Bevan's song "Little Things” in an article entitled "A History of the Love Song in 10 Tracks", as an important song in the digital era. In the article, author Jude Rogers, wrote: "["Little Things"] tackled the physical inadequacies many young women feel in the age of social media and told them they were OK to have". Bevan commented that "it felt very important to write it like a feminist love song...Girls at that age – 12, 13, when their self-esteem is often rock bottom – need to hear those things said, so to hear them from their heroes is life-changing." Bevan received "hundreds of messages from girls on social media after the song grew in popularity.

Bevan released a new solo EP, Wild Angels, Sweet Demons on Venus Climbing Records in 2018.

== Collaborations ==
=== Ed Sheeran/One Direction ===
Bevan co-wrote the One Direction song "Little Things" with Ed Sheeran, which appeared on their second studio album Take Me Home (2012). In October 2012, Sheeran acknowledged her songwriting skills in an interview with the British radio network Capital FM, stating:

"The great thing about it is I wrote that song with a girl called Fiona Bevan when I was 17 and we lost the song. I've kept in touch with Fiona, we've done gigs and stuff, and about two months ago she sent me the tune and was like, 'Oh, do you remember this?' I was like, 'Yeah, I do remember that', and I was in the studio with the One Direction boys at the time and I was playing it and they were like, 'We really like that'. It's got one of my favorite lines that I've ever written in a song."

=== Carl Ryden/Steps ===
In 2017, Fiona worked with the group Steps on their comeback album Tears on the Dancefloor. "Scared of the Dark", the single she and Carl Ryden co-wrote for Steps, reached number 37 on the UK Singles Chart.

=== Ben Haenow ===
Bevan co-wrote "One Night" for Ben Haenow with Ben and producer duo Red Triangle (production team) for his deluxe debut album. The album reached the top 10 in the UK, and his subsequent 'One Night Tour' was also named after the track.

=== Gwyneth Herbert ===
Bevan co-wrote, with Gwyneth Herbert, two songs on Herbert's 2013 album The Sea Cabinet – "I Still Hear the Bells" and "The King's Shilling"– and performed with Herbert on the album and at its London launch at Wilton's Music Hall in May 2013.

=== Laura Welsh ===
With Laura Welsh, Bevan co-wrote the singles 'Red' and 'Concrete' from the 'See Red EP' which The Line Of Best Fit called "stunning". Bevan also co-wrote Laura's previous single 'Sex and Violence' which was released as a 'Stream Only' premiere on Spin.com.

=== ARCO ===
Alongside Neil Luck, Bevan co-composed music for and performed alongside the avant-garde string ensemble ARCO on Last Wane Days (squib-box), a two-act monodrama for voice and ensemble, released on 12 March 2012. In a review, Tim Rutherford-Johnson wrote: "Bevan, in particular, can turn her voice on a dime. As co-composers, Luck and Bevan use sound and recurring motifs cleverly so that the rampant dislocations achieve an unexpected coherence and continuity. Serious artistry".

== Music for advertisements and television ==
In the spring of 2015, Bevan's track "Slo Mo Tiger Glo" from her album Talk To Strangers was chosen as the theme music for the HSBC adverts aired in the UK and Ireland. Her song "Beginners Luck" was used as the E! 2015 winter red carpet season USA track.

== Discography ==
Album	Release date	Label
Plant Your Heart	16 November 2009	Fallen Idol
Talk to Strangers	28 April 2014	Navigator Records

EP	Release date	Label
In the Swimming Pool	16 February 2007	Fiona Bevan
Us and the Darkness	March 2011	Venus Climbing
Wild Angels Sweet Demoms	November 2018	Venus Climbing
Girl With Telescope		
First Woman On The Moon		

=== Songwriting credits ===
indicates a background vocal contribution.

Year	Artist	Album	Song	Co-written with
2012	One Direction	Take Me Home	"Little Things"	Edward Sheeran
2013	Gwyneth Herbert	The Sea Cabinet	"I Still Hear the Bells" and "The King's Shilling"	Gwyneth Herbert
2014	5 Seconds of Summer	5 Seconds of Summer	"Voodoo Doll"	Calum Hood, Ashton Irwin, Adam Argyle
2015	Ben Haenow	Ben Haenow	"One Night"	Benjamin Haenow, George Tizzard, Richard Parkhouse
2016	Max	Non-album single	"Christmas Song"	Max Schneider, Matthew Radosevich
2016	Tom Walker	Non-album single	"Play Dead"	Thomas Walker, Joshua Grant
2016	Laura Welsh	See Red EP	"Red"	Laura Welsh, Jonas Wallin
2016	Laura Welsh	See Red EP	"Concrete"	Laura Welsh, Jonas Wallin
2016	Una Healy	The Waiting Game	"Angel Like You"	Una Healy, Jez Ashurst
2017	Steps	Tears on the Dancefloor	"Scared of the Dark"	Carl Ryden
2017	Caitlyn Shadbolt	Songs on My Sleeve	"My Friends & I"	Caitlyn Shadbolt, Mark Landon
2017	Steps	Tears on the Dancefloor	"Neon Blue"	Carl Ryden
2017	Tom Walker	Blessings EP	"Rapture"	Thomas Walker, Timothy Deal
2017	Hey Violet	From the Outside	"Unholy"	Nia Lovelis, Rena Lovelis, Miranda Miller, Casey Moreta, Julian Bunetta, David Pramik
2017	Lights	Skin & Earth	"Skydiving"	Lights Poxleitner, Matthew Radoisevich
2017	Tom Walker	Non-album single	"Heartland"	Thomas Walker, Shahid Kahn, Wesley Muoria-Chaves
2017	Guy Sebastian	Conscious	"High On Me"	Guy Sebastian, Mark Landon
2017	Lights	Skin & Earth	"Morphine"	Lights Poxleitner, Steve James Philbin
2017	Mika	Non-album single	"It's My House"	Michael Penniman Jr., Jonathan Quarmby
2017	Steps	Tears on the Dancefloor: Crying at the Disco	"Fool for You"	Carl Ryden
2017	Sonny Alven	Non-album single	"Cool with You" (featuring Goldens)	Sondre Alvestad, Jonny Wright, Simen Hope
2017	Alexandru	Non-album single	"Sellotape"	James Newman, Maegan Cottone, Jack Walton
2017	No Frills Twins	Non-album single	"Lonely with You"	Inna Rogers, Vanessa Rogers, Ash Howes, Richard Stannard
2018	Owen Thiele	TBA	"Some Like It Hot"	Wynne Bennet
2018	Aurora	Infections of a Different; Kind (Step 1)	"Queendom"	Aurora Aksnes, James Edward Jacob, Couros Shebani
2018	Natalie Prass	The Future and the Past	"Far from You"	Natalie Prass
2018	Lewis Capaldi	Breach EP	"Tough"	Lewis Capaldi, Jonathan Quarmby
2018	Tom Walker	What a Time to Be Alive	"My Way"	Thomas Walker, Timothy Deal
2018	LION	LION	"Oh No"	Bethany Lowen
2018	Aurora	Infections of a Different; Kind (Step 1)	"Gentle Earthquakes"	Aurora Aksnes, James Edward Jacob, Couros Shebani
2018	Aurora	Infections of a Different; Kind (Step 1)	"Soft Universe"	Aurora Aksnes, James Edward Jacob, Couros Shebani
2018	Joseph J. Jones	Built on Broken Bones Vol. 1	"Put the Word Out"	Joseph Gibbons
2018	Joseph J. Jones	Built on Broken Bones Vol. 1	"Angels Turn Away"	Joseph Gibbons
2018	Backstreet Boys	DNA	"Chances"	Shawn Mendes, Scott Harris, Geoff Warburton, Ryan Tedder, Zach Skelton, Casey Smith
2018	Andy Brown	Non-album single	"Put That Record On"	Andrew Brown, Jonny Wright
2019	Claire Richards	My Wildest Dreams	"My Wildest Dreams"	Steve Anderson
2019	James Morrison	You're Stronger Than You Know	"Brighter Kind of Love"	James Morrison, Jonathan Quarmby
2019	311	Voyager	"Good Feeling"	Nicholas Hexon, Matthew Malpass, John Feldmann
2019	Andy Black	The Ghost of Ohio	"Heroes We Were"	Andrew Beirsack, Matthew Malpass, John Feldmann, Stephen Beerkens
2019	Ashley Tisdale	Symptoms	"Insomnia"	Ashley Tisdale, John Feldmann, Dylan McLean, Scott Stewart
2019	Tom Walker	What a Time to Be Alive	"All That Matters"	Thomas Walker, Timothy Deal
2019	Aurora	A Different Kind of Human (Step 2)	"Hunger"	Aurora Aksnes
2020	The Shires	Good Years	"On the Day I Die"	Ben Earle, Peter Hammerton
2020	The Shires	Good Years	"Independence Day"	Ben Earle, Peter Hammerton
2020	Steps	What the Future Holds	"Come and Dance with Me"	Carl Ryden
2020	Kylie Minogue	Disco	"Unstoppable"	Kylie Minogue, Troy Miller
2021	Natalie Imbruglia	Firebird	"Build It Better"	Natalie Imbruglia, Luke Fitton
2021	Natalie Imbruglia	Firebird	"River"	Natalie Imbruglia
