= Story of a Heart (song) =

Single by Benny Andersson Band.

from the album Story of a Heart
- Released: May 2009
- Genre: Pop music
- Length: 5:07
- Label: Mono Music
- Songwriters: Benny Andersson; Björn Ulvaeus
- Producer: Benny Andersson

Benny Andersson Band. singles chronology
"Sommaren du fick" (2009)	"Story of a Heart" (2009)	"Kära syster" (2011)

Audio video
- "Story of a Heart" on YouTube

"Story of a Heart" (Swedish: Sommaren du fick) is a song co-written by Swedish musicians Benny Andersson and Björn Ulvaeus and recorded by Benny Andersson's Band for their first compilation album of the same name (2009); it features vocals from Swedish singer Helen Sjöholm. British group Steps covered the song for their fifth studio album, Tears on the Dancefloor (2017). It was released as the second single from the album in the form of a remix EP on 12 May 2017, with a radio release slated for 16 June.

== Background ==
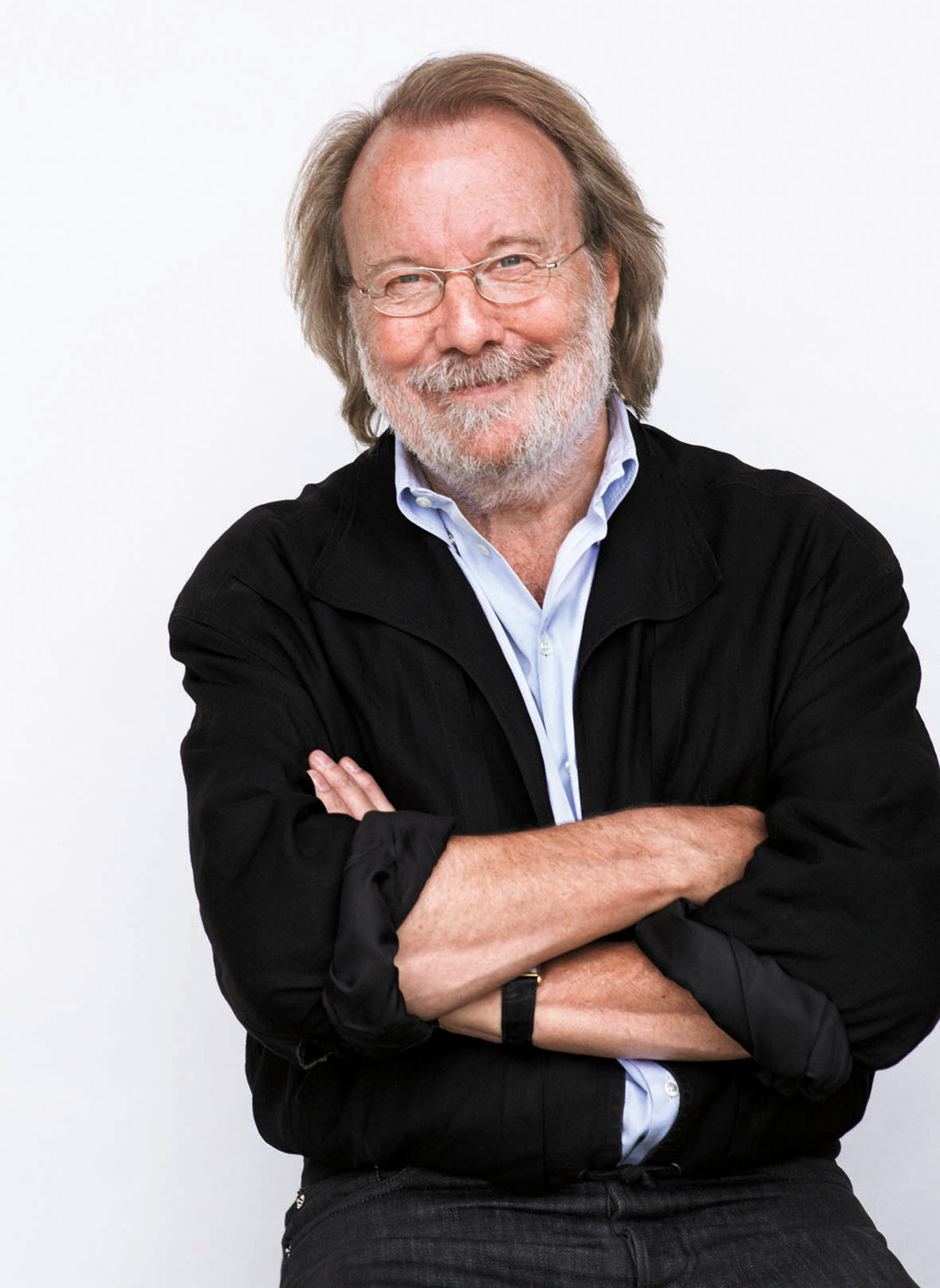
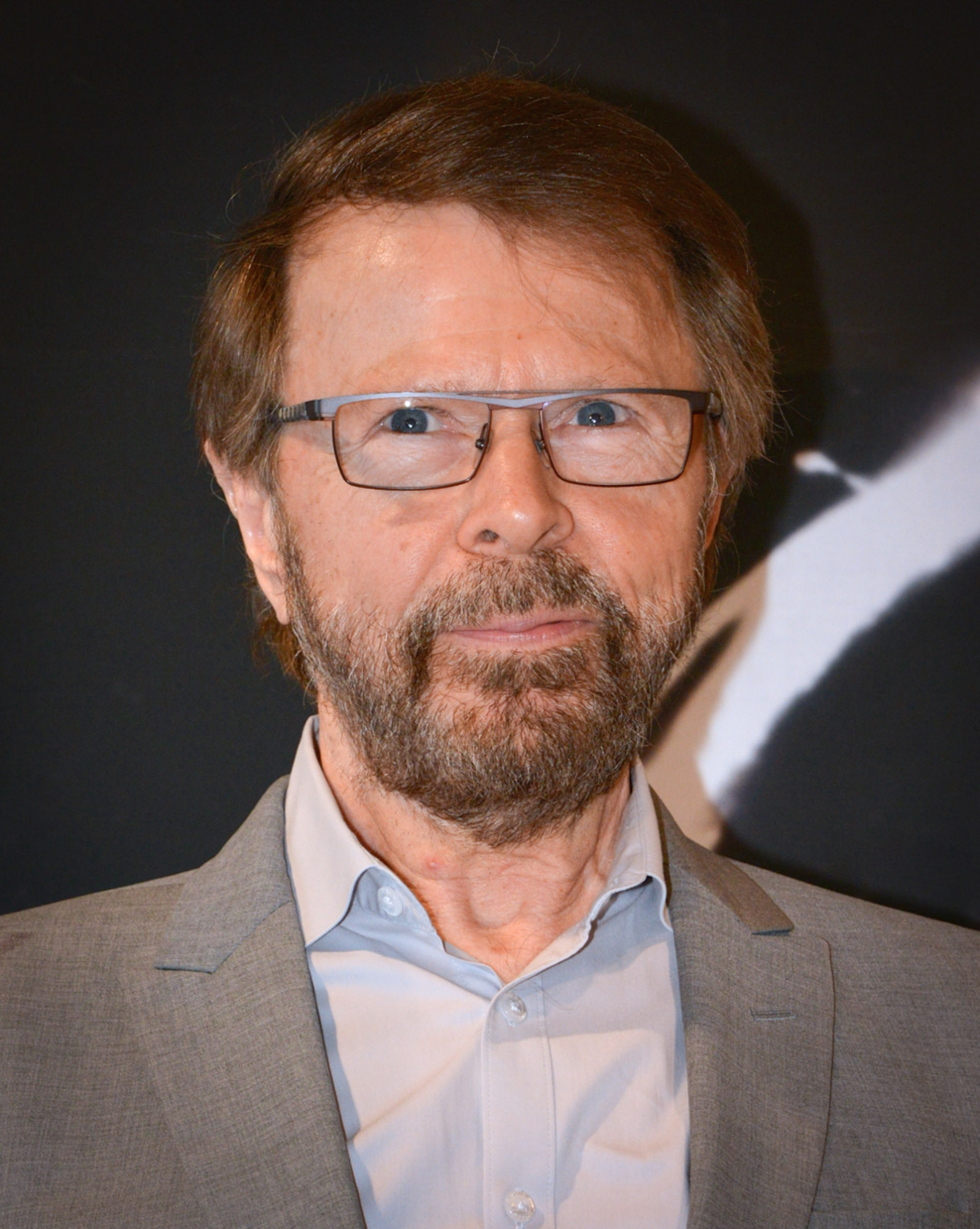
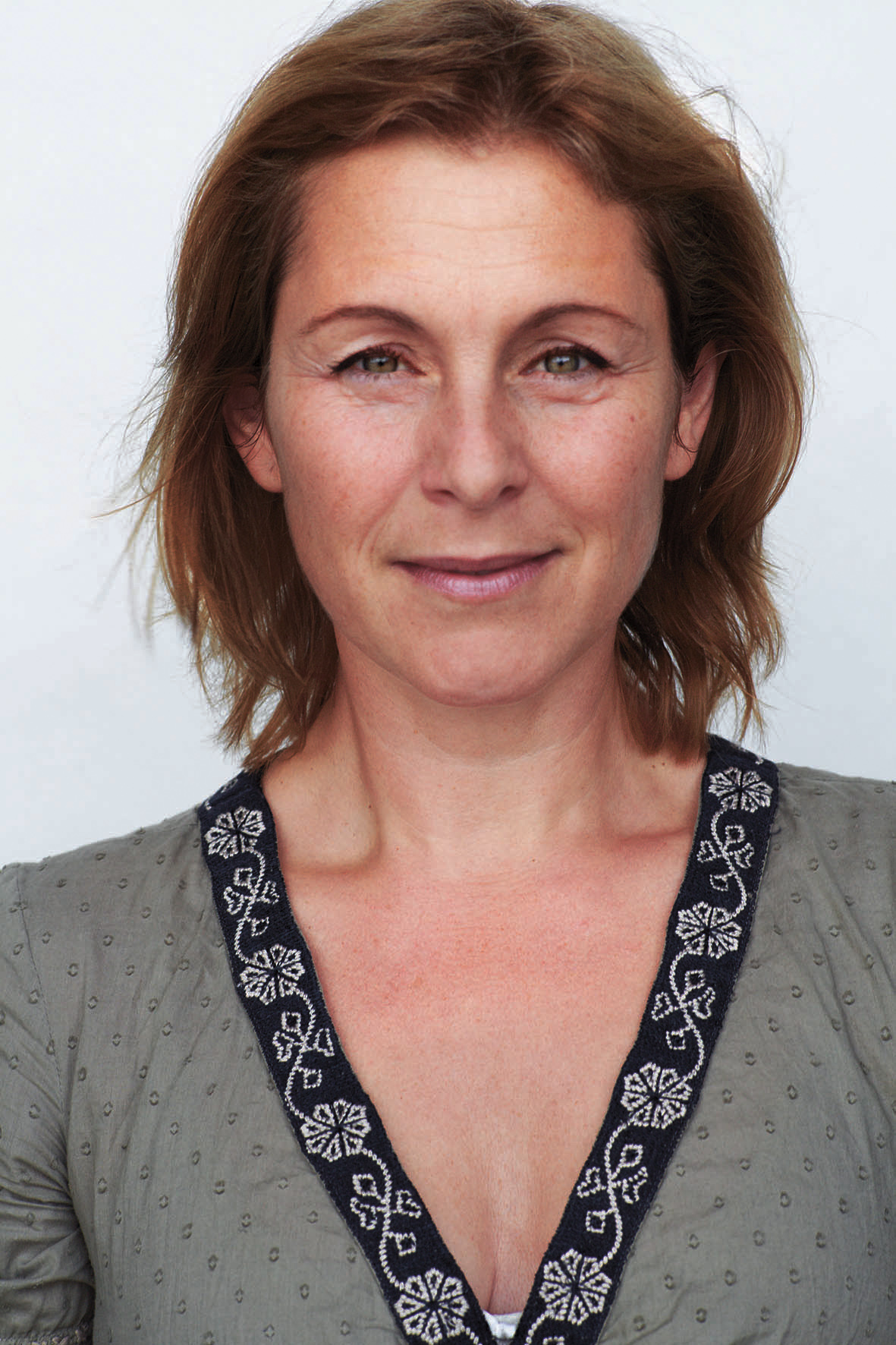
"Story of a Heart" was written and composed by Benny Andersson and Björn Ulvaeus (left and centre) and originally featured vocals by Helen Sjöholm (right).

"Story of a Heart" was co-written Benny Andersson and Björn Ulvaeus – the former composed the music and the latter wrote the lyrics – and recorded by Benny Anderssons Band for their first compilation album of the same name (2009). Included as a new original recording for the compilation, it appears as the third song on the track listing with a running time of five minutes, seven seconds and features vocals from Helen Sjöholm. It was recorded at various recording studios in Stockholm, Sweden, including Polar Studios, Sveriges Radios Studios, Atlantis Studios and Mono Music Studio, while it was mixed by Andersson and Bernard Löhr at Polar Studios and Mono Music Studios. It was also mastered by Björn Engelmann at the Cutting Room in Stockholm. In addition to composing the music, Andersson produced the song and also played the piano, accordion and synthesizer.

A variety of instruments and musicians were used and involved in the recording process; the accordion was played by Lars Rudolfsson and the acoustic and electric guitars, banjo, violin, mandolin and bouzouki were all played by Kalle Moraeus. It also features Jörgen Stenberg on the drums and percussion, Jogga Ernlund on the electric and double bass, Janne Bengtson on the flute, piccolo flute, baritone saxophone and crumhorn, and Göran Arnberg on the keyboards. Additional musicians included Pär Grebacken on the saxophone, clarinet and recorder, Leif Lindvall on the trumpet and cornet, Calle Jakobsson on the tuba, trombone and trumpet, Leif Göras, Nicke Göthe, Perra Moraeus and Olle Moraeus on violin and mandolin, with Perra Moraeus also playing the alto saxophone and clarinet and Olle Moraeus on the viola.

With the song, Benny Anderssons orkester scored an August 2009 Svensktoppen hit, charting for four weeks and peaking at 4th position. It also peaked at 17th position at the Swedish singles chart.

== Steps version ==
"Story of a Heart"

Single by Steps

from the album Tears on the Dancefloor
- Released: 12 May 2017 (Remix EP)
- Genre: Europop
- Length: 4:16
- Label: Steps Music LLP; Fascination; Absolute
- Songwriters: Benny Andersson; Björn Ulvaeus
- Producer: The Alias

Steps singles chronology
"Scared of the Dark" (2017)	"Story of a Heart" (2017)	"Neon Blue" (2017)

Music videos
- "Story of a Heart" on YouTube; "Story of a Heart" (remix) on YouTube

On 28 November 2016, it was announced that Steps would be performing at G-A-Y on New Year's Eve to celebrate twenty years since they formed in 1997, with the Official Charts Company speculating that the group would mark the anniversary with celebrations throughout 2017. On 6 March 2017, the group confirmed the release of a new single, album and tour to commemorate twenty years of Steps. They confirmed the title of the lead single to be "Scared of the Dark" and that it would precede the parent album, Tears on the Dancefloor, which was released on 21 April 2017, and be supported by the accompanying Party on the Dancefloor Tour in November and December 2017.

Following the announcement, it was revealed that Andersson and Ulvaeus had given Steps a song to record for Tears on the Dancefloor. In an interview with The Sun, band member Lisa Scott-Lee elaborated on the collaboration: "We’ve always had that comparison with ABBA so it’s amazing to work with Benny and Bjorn. When we heard the special album track they gave to us we said, ‘that’s perfect.’ It’s a bridge to where we were and it moves on nicely to where we’re taking the new music." Claire Richards added that Andersson approved of their cover, saying "Benny really liked our take on it. He said it’s almost as good as his version!”

On 20 April 2017, "Story of a Heart" was made available as an instant free download and to stream one day before the release of Tears on the Dancefloor. It is the third song on the track listing of the album, and the digital version of Tears on the Dancefloor includes a radio mix by British remix and production team 7th Heaven, as the twelfth and final track. On 12 May, Steps released a five-track remix extended play which includes a radio mix and a club mix produced by Cutmore, as well as a new 7th Heaven club remix. Tracks four and five are previously unreleased club remixes of their previous single "Scared of the Dark" by 7th Heaven and the Wideboys. "Story of a Heart" will be released for radio airplay on BBC Radio 1 on 16 June as the second single from the album.

=== Overview ===
"Story of a Heart" is a 1970s style mid-tempo europop song with a duration of four minutes and 16 seconds. As with the album's previous single "Scared of the Dark", the lead vocals are performed by the female band members Scott-Lee, Richards and Faye Tozer, while the male members, Latchford-Evans and Ian "H" Watkins, provide background vocals on the chorus. Steps recorded their vocals separately due to difficulty of scheduling recording time for five members at the time same due personal schedules and other commitments, in addition to keeping their twentieth anniversary plans a secret from the public and the media. Scott-Lee revealed that she flew to the United Kingdom from her home in Dubai in the United Arab Emirates to record her vocals for "Story of a Heart" and never saw her fellow band members in the process, a sentiment that Latchford-Evans seconded. She recalled how they used to record their vocals together around a microphone in a booth and how the process appeared to have changed in the twenty years since their split in 2001 where it is now done separately.

Steps' cover of the song has garnered numerous comparisons to ABBA, a group they were often compared to early in their career because of their similarly composed "infectious pop melodies" and "soaring vocals". Aside from "Story of a Heart", having been written by Benny Andersson and Björn Ulvaeus of ABBA for Andersson's band, Steps had previously covered songs by Andersson and Ulvaeus, "I Know Him So Well" from their musical Chess and ABBA's "Lay All Your Love on Me", as well as the medley "Thank ABBA for the Music", for the ABBAmania tribute album (1999), They also covered "Dancing Queen" as a bonus track for their second greatest hits album The Ultimate Collection (2011). Brandon Veevers of Renowned for Sound wrote that Steps covering another ABBA song, or a song written by some of its members, as "destined to happen at some point during the Steps story" and that it seemed right that they accepted Andersson's offer for them to record "Story of a Heart". He added that it has a modern feel and compared it to "Super Trouper", another ABBA song.

=== Critical reception ===
The song was met with a positive response from critics. AXS contributor Lucas Villa praised the track, writing that Steps had often been compared to ABBA early in their career, and that their covering of a song written by Andersson and Ulvaeus "joined them together". He also wrote that compared to the lead single "Scared of the Dark", and the promotional single "You Make Me Whole", "Story of a Heart" "sounds most like the Steps fans grew to love in the late '90s." Matt Bagwell of The Huffington Post awarded the song five out of five stars in his track-by-track review of Tears on the Dancefloor; he noted that it was unlikely anyone but a "die-hard fan" of ABBA would have heard the original by Benny Andersson's Band, but Richards and Tozer "prove they’re more than a match for Agnetha and Frida in the vocal department." Writing for Gay Times, Lewis Corner praised the track, describing it as "soaring" and "nostalgic". Shaun Kitchener of the Daily Express noted that "Story of a Heart" is the closest song to a ballad on the album but does not interrupt the overall tempo. The track garnered a mixed response from Hannah J. Davies of The Guardian, writing that it is "a crooning cover of an already crooning number by Abba’s Benny and Björn."

Steps have performed "Story of a Heart" live on Big Brother's Bit on the Side, Weekend and Lorraine.

=== Formats and track listings ===
Digital download - Remix EP

1. "Story of a Heart" (Cutmore Radio Mix) – 3:31
2. "Story of a Heart" (7th Heaven Club Mix) – 7:38
3. "Story of a Heart" (Cutmore Club Mix) – 4:51
4. "Scared of the Dark" (7th Heaven Club Mix) – 6:56
5. "Scared of the Dark" (Wideboys Step It Up Club Mix) – 4:26

Tears On The Dancefloor - The Singles Collection (4CD Box Set)

CD2 - Story of a Heart

1. "Story of a Heart" – 4:17
2. "Story of a Heart" (7th Heaven Club Mix) – 7:39
3. "Story of a Heart" (7th Heaven Radio Mix) – 3:33
4. "Story of a Heart" (Cutmore Club Mix) – 4:51
5. "Story of a Heart" (Cutmore Radio Edit) – 3:31
6. "Story of a Heart" (Cutmore Dub) – 4:31
7. "Glitter & Gold" (Rescue Rangerz Radio Mix) – 4:00
8. "Glitter & Gold" (Rescue Rangerz Club Mix) – 5:16
9. "Firefly" (Ste Ingham Radio Edit) – 3:36
10. "Firefly" (Ste Ingham Club Mix) – 5:37

=== Credits and personnel ===
- Lead vocals – Faye Tozer, Claire Richards, Lisa Scott-Lee
- Background vocals – Lee Latchford Evans, Ian "H" Watkins
- Songwriting – Benny Andersson, Björn Ulvaeus
- Production – The Alias
- Keyboards and programming – Julian Gingell, Barry Stone, Carl Ryden
- Guitars – James Nisbet
- Mixing – Pete Hofmann

Credits adapted from the liner notes of Tears on the Dancefloor.

=== Charts ===
Chart (2017)	Peak position
Scotland Singles (OCC)	75
UK Downloads (Official Charts Company)	69
UK Indie (OCC)	15
UK Sales (Official Charts Company)	74

=== Release history ===
Country	Date	Format	Version	Label	Ref.
Various	21 April 2017	Digital download; streaming; (as part of the Tears on the Dancefloor album)	Original	Steps Music LLP; Fascination; Absolute	
Various	21 April 2017	Digital download; streaming; (as part of the Tears on the Dancefloor album)	7th Heaven remix	Steps Music LLP; Fascination; Absolute	
Various	12 May 2017	Digital download	Remix EP	Steps Music LLP; Fascination; Absolute	
United Kingdom	6 June 2017	Radio airplay (BBC Radio 1)	Original	Steps Music LLP; Fascination; Absolute	
