= H & Claire =

British pop duo

- H & Claire in 2002

Background information
- Origin: United Kingdom
- Genre: Pop
- Years active: 2002–2003
- Label: WEA
- Spinoff of: Steps
- Members: Claire Richards; Ian "H" Watkins

H & Claire was an English-Welsh pop duo consisting of Steps members Claire Richards and Ian "H" Watkins. They scored three top 10 hits on the UK singles chart in 2002.

== Career ==
Following the split of Steps on 26 December 2001, H & Claire formed the duo. The pair released their debut single "DJ" on WEA Records on 6 May 2002. The single debuted and peaked on the UK Singles Chart at number 3, spending a week in the top 10.

Their second single, "Half a Heart" followed on 12 August 2002, peaking at number 8. Their third and final single release was a double A-side of an original song entitled "All Out of Love" and a cover of the Disney song "Beauty and the Beast". The single was released in November 2002 and peaked at number 10, spending three weeks on the UK top 40. Their debut album, Another You Another Me, followed. However, it peaked at number 58 on the UK Albums Chart, and WEA Records soon dropped the pair. One notable aspect of the album was the hat that Claire donned for the album cover, which is still regarded as iconic two decades later.

Following the release of the duo's debut album, they were set to go back into the studio to record new material after Richards' wedding, although that never materialized following Richards retiring from the public eye meaning they disbanded in 2003.

In May 2011, the duo reunited with their original group Steps.

In November 2020, a collection of B-Sides, along with remix bundles for the album's three singles, were uploaded to streaming services to mark the 18th anniversary of Another You Another Me.

In 2023, H & Claire came together for a one off appearance at Pride Cymru to celebrate 20 years of their debut single DJ.

== Discography ==
=== Albums ===
Title	Album details	Peak chart position
Title	Album details	UK
Another You Another Me	Released: 18 November 2002; Label: WEA; Formats: CD	58

=== EP ===
Title	Album details	Peak chart position
Title	Album details	UK
Don't Give Up (Don't Let Go)	Released: 2020; Label: WEA; Formats: digital download, streaming	-

=== Singles ===
Year	Title	Peak chart positions		Album
Year	Title	UK	AUS	Album
2002	"DJ"	3	69	Another You Another Me
2002	"Half a Heart"	8	93	Another You Another Me
2002	"All Out of Love" / "Beauty and the Beast"	10	—	Another You Another Me

=== Music videos ===
Year	Title	Director(s)
2002	"DJ"	Patrick Kiely
2002	"Half a Heart"	Cameron Casey
2002	"All Out of Love"	Phil Griffin
2002	"Beauty & the Beast"	David Amphlett
