= Better Best Forgotten =

1999 single by Steps

- CD2 cover

Single by Steps

from the album Step One
- B-side: "Why?"
- Released: 8 March 1999
- Studio: PWL (London and Manchester, England)
- Genre: Pop
- Length: 3:42
- Label: Jive; Ebul Records
- Songwriters: Andrew Frampton; Pete Waterman
- Producers: Mark Topham; Karl Twigg; Pete Waterman

Steps singles chronology
"Heartbeat" / "Tragedy" (1998)	"Better Best Forgotten" (1999)	"Thank ABBA for the Music" (1999)

Music video
- "Better Best Forgotten" on YouTube

"Better Best Forgotten" is a song by British pop group Steps, released on 8 March 1999. It was the final single to be taken from their debut album, Step One. The song became the group's fourth top-10 hit in the UK, peaking at number two on the UK Singles Chart, and it also reached the top 20 in Ireland and the Flanders region of Belgium.

A stripped back ballad version of the track was performed during the 2012 Christmas with Steps tour. "Better Best Forgotten" features all three girls singing a verse each with the boys joining in for the choruses.

== Critical reception ==
Can't Stop the Pop wrote that this was the song "most strikingly consistent" with the "ABBA-on-speed" vision, that Pete Waterman strove to achieve with the group. They added that Faye, Lisa and Claire "all bring such drama" to the track, "they sing as though their life depends on it, and that – among many other things – is what worked so well about Steps." Scottish newspaper Daily Record noted that the group "continue to shine in the charts with their latest Abba-esque hit", "Better Best Forgotten". They also wrote that this "catchy tune" is "sure to fill the dance floors." Sarah Davis from Dotmusic stated that "this predictably Abba-sounding track builds energetically to reach its adrenaline-filled peak in a hook-laden, singalong chorus. The group really cannot put a foot wrong at present". Gary James from Entertainment Focus noted it as a "uplifting" and "energetic" pop song, with "fairytale references of happy endings and taking chances." He added that this track is "definitely not best forgotten". Mark Beaumont from NME said it is "great". Sunday Mirror commented, "A poppy enough tune from the smiley five piece but they need some new material. And fast."

== Chart performance ==
"Better Best Forgotten" entered the UK Singles Chart at number two in March 1999, beaten to number one by Boyzone's "When the Going Gets Tough". It spent 17 weeks on the British charts and became the first single for Steps to fall off the chart and re-enter. The song topped the UK Indie Chart while reaching number eight in Ireland. Additionally, it was a top-20 hit in Belgium and peaked at number 11 on the Eurochart Hot 100.

== Music video ==
A music video was made to accompany the song, directed by David Amphlett. It has a watery-theme, and the group wear blue outfits. Group members Lee and H play with water pistols, and interfere with the girls' singing.

== Track listings ==
UK CD1
No.	Title	Writer(s)	Length
1.	"Better Best Forgotten" (radio edit)	Andrew Frampton; Pete Waterman	3:42
2.	"Why?"	Mark Topham; Karl Twigg	4:08
3.	"Better Best Forgotten" (W.I.P. '99 Cream of Manchester Mix)	Frampton; Waterman	6:16

UK CD2
No.	Title	Writer(s)	Length
1.	"Better Best Forgotten" (radio edit)	Andrew Frampton; Pete Waterman	3:42
2.	"Better Best Forgotten" (Nip on the Dance Floor W.I.P. Mix)	Frampton; Waterman	5:20
3.	"Better Best Forgotten" (instrumental)	Frampton; Waterman	3:42
4.	"Better Best Forgotten" (video)

UK cassette single
No.	Title	Writer(s)	Length
1.	"Better Best Forgotten" (radio edit)	Andrew Frampton; Pete Waterman	3:42
2.	"Why?"	Mark Topham; Karl Twigg	4:08

== Credits and personnel ==
=== A-side: "Better Best Forgotten" ===
Credits are adapted from the liner notes of Step One.

Recording

- Recorded at PWL Studios (London and Manchester, England)
- Mixed at PWL Studios (London and Manchester, England)
- Mastered at Transfermation (London, England)

Personnel

- Songwriting – Andrew Frampton, Pete Waterman
- Production – Mark Topham, Karl Twigg, Pete Waterman
- Mixing – Dan Frampton
- Engineering – Chris McDonnell, Dan Frampton
- Drums – Chris McDonnell
- Keyboards – Karl Twigg, Mark Topham

=== B-side: "Why?" ===
Credits are adapted from the liner notes of "Better Best Forgotten".

Recording

- Recorded at PWL Studios (London and Manchester, England)
- Mixed at PWL Studios (London and Manchester, England)
- Mastered at Transfermation (London, England)

Personnel

- Songwriting – Mark Topham, Karl Twigg
- Production – Mark Topham, Karl Twigg, Pete Waterman
- Mixing – Dan Frampton, Paul Waterman
- Engineering – Chris McDonnell
- Remix – Work in Progress

== Charts ==
=== Weekly charts ===
Chart (1999)	Peak position
Belgium (Ultratop 50 Flanders)	20
Estonia (Eesti Top 20)	17
Europe (Eurochart Hot 100)	11
Ireland (IRMA)	8
Netherlands (Dutch Top 40 Tipparade)	17
Netherlands (Single Top 100)	77
Scottish Singles Sales (Official Charts)	2
UK Singles (Official Charts)	2
UK Airplay (Music Week)	23
UK Indie (Official Charts)	1

=== Year-end charts ===
Chart (1999)	Position
UK Singles (OCC)	51

== Certifications ==
Region	Certification	Certified units/sales
United Kingdom (BPI)	Gold	400,000^{^}
^{^} Shipments figures based on certification alone.
