= Tears on the Dancefloor =

2017 studio album by Steps

Studio album by Steps
- Released: 21 April 2017
- Recorded: October 2016–Early 2017
- Genres: Europop; dance-pop; electropop; disco
- Length: 37:36
- Labels: Absolute; Fascination
- Producers: The Alias; Carl Ryden; Brian Rawling

Steps chronology
Light Up the World (2012)	Tears on the Dancefloor (2017)	Tears on the Dancefloor: Crying at the Disco (2017)

Singles from Tears on the Dancefloor
- 1. "Scared of the Dark" Released: 10 March 2017; 2. "Story of a Heart" Released: 12 May 2017; 3. "Neon Blue" Released: 4 August 2017

Professional ratings
Review scores
Source	Rating
Daily Express	4/5 stars
The Guardian	3/5 stars
The Huffington Post	4/5 stars
Renowned for Sound	5/5 stars

Tears on the Dancefloor is the fifth studio album by British group Steps. It was released on 21 April 2017, by Absolute and Fascination Records. The album is the group's first album in five years since Light Up the World, and their first traditional album since Buzz in 2000. Following two years of planning, recording began in October 2016. The Alias was enlisted to serve as the executive producer for Tears on the Dancefloor and various songwriters submitted songs for the group to record, including Steve Mac, Ina Wroldsen, TMS and Fiona Bevan. It also features a cover version of "Story of a Heart" by Björn Ulvaeus and Benny Andersson of ABBA, a cover of "I Will Love Again" by Lara Fabian as well as a cover of "No More Tears on the Dancefloor" by Anders|Fahrenkrog, from which the album's title is derived.

The album was re-released on 27 October 2017 as Tears on the Dancefloor: Crying at the Disco with five new songs, three of which have accompanying remixes.

== Background and release ==
In 2011, Steps reunited for a four-part documentary series, which aired on Sky Living. Documenting their highly publicised and acrimonious split on Boxing Day in 2001, it revealed what each member had been doing for the previous ten years, as well as reflecting on their time in the group and the truth, causes and effects of their disbandment. It further showed how they could repair their professional, and personal, relationships as a five-piece for the release of their second greatest hits album, The Ultimate Collection (2011), and discussions of officially reforming. The positive response to the album led to the announcement of a reunion arena tour, The Ultimate Tour, in April 2012, and their fourth studio/first Christmas album, Light Up the World, later that year. On 28 November 2016, it was revealed that Steps would be performing at G-A-Y on New Year's Eve to celebrate twenty years since their debut.

On 6 March 2017, Steps confirmed that their fifth studio album, Tears on the Dancefloor, would be released on 21 April in the United Kingdom and be preceded by the lead single, "Scared of the Dark", on 10 March; they also announced the Party on the Dancefloor Tour, which will take place in November and December 2017. In an interview for the Official Charts Company in March 2017, band member Faye Tozer confirmed The Alias as the producer for Tears on the Dancefloor, while Lisa Scott-Lee revealed that planning the album had taken two years in an interview for Popjustice. It is their first album to be composed of mostly original material in seventeen years; Light Up the World was composed of both cover and original songs, and was their first studio album in twelve years.

Recording for the album began in October 2016; Tozer revealed that the first two songs they recorded were omitted from the final track listing due to not sounding "Steps-enough". Scott-Lee revealed that the group had recorded two albums' worth of material during the production of Tears on the Dancefloor, but said that no formal discussions have taken place as to whether or not a sixth studio album will follow in 2018 despite reaffirming her personal desire to do so. Three editions of Tears on the Dancefloor were made available to purchase on their website: a digital version available for download, a limited edition signed CD and a limited edition neon-blue vinyl. The album artwork was inspired by the album cover of their debut album, Step One (1998).

== Composition ==
=== Music and lyrics ===
In an interview with Popjustice, Scott-Lee stated that the group strived to create an uplifting, positive pop album and to provide a form of escapism for listeners: "We're not here to get into the politics of the world but what we can offer is escapism and a bit of positivity in people's lives." She continued to elucidate that Tears on the Dancefloor sounds like where they should be twenty years on from their debut, saying "Everyone's dealing with lots of different things but music's universal, and it takes you to another place and time, and this album — I feel — is where Steps should be twenty years on." Songwriters for the album include Steve Mac, Ina Wroldsen, TMS, Carl Ryden, Fiona Bevan, Kevin Verchel and Metrophonic. The group took some inspiration from their back catalogue for the album, with Tozer saying that its sound is reminiscent of their single "Deeper Shade of Blue" (2000) but has more elements of dance music. They also revealed that the album consists of up-tempo songs with a couple of mid-tempo tracks, but no ballads, citing fans preferring their upbeat songs as their reason for deciding not to record any.

=== Songs ===
The lead single from the album, "Scared of the Dark", has been described by Popjustice as a "robust blast of pop melodrama", which they thought sounded as though it was lifted from their first greatest hits album, Gold: Greatest Hits (2001). Tozer revealed that a track called "Neon Blue" had been written by Ryden and Bevan, who have written songs for David Guetta and The Saturdays, respectively. She continued to describe the track as "nostalgic" and a "real homecoming type of song". Steps have also recorded a cover version of "Story of a Heart" originally performed by Benny Anderssons Band, and written and composed by Benny Andersson and Björn Ulvaeus of ABBA. Scott-Lee stated that they have often been compared to ABBA and that Anderson and Ulvaeus had given it to them to record and that it serves as a "perfect" bridge to fill the gap between where they were as a group and where they are taking their music forward.

== Singles ==
"Scared of the Dark" premiered on The Ken Bruce Show on BBC Radio 2 on 9 March 2017, and was released on iTunes, Spotify and Apple Music the following day. During a Facebook Live interview with HuffPost UK Entertainment, Ian "H" Watkins announced that "Story of a Heart" would be the album's second single. "Neon Blue" was released as the third single on 4 August 2017.

== Track listing ==
Credits adapted from the liner notes of Tears on the Dancefloor.

Tears on the Dancefloor
No.	Title	Writer(s)	Producer(s)	Length
1.	"Scared of the Dark"	Carl Ryden; Fiona Bevan	The Alias; Ryden	3:46
2.	"You Make Me Whole"	Ina Wroldsen; Thomas Barnes; Peter Kelleher; Benjamin Kohn; Wayne Hector	The Alias	3:42
3.	"Story of a Heart"	Benny Andersson; Björn Ulvaeus	The Alias	4:16
4.	"Happy"	Wroldsen; Steve McCutcheon	The Alias	3:37
5.	"No More Tears on the Dancefloor"	Carl Falk; Darren Hayes	The Alias	3:47
6.	"Firefly"	Wroldsen; McCutcheon	The Alias	3:26
7.	"Space Between Us"	Barry Stone; Julian Gingell	The Alias	4:16
8.	"Glitter & Gold"	Stone; Gingell	The Alias	3:36
9.	"Neon Blue"	Ryden; Bevan	The Alias; Ryden	3:26
10.	"I Will Love Again"	Mark Taylor; Paul Barry	Brian Rawling; Paul Meehan	3:44
Total length:				37:36

Digital bonus tracks
No.	Title	Producer(s)	Length
11.	"Scared of the Dark" (Wideboys in the Shadows Vocal Mix)	The Alias; Ryden; Wideboys (add.)	3:45
12.	"Story of a Heart" (7th Heaven Radio Mix)	The Alias; 7th Heaven (add.)	3:33
Total length:			44:54

Notes

- "You Make Me Whole" is a cover of the song originally performed by Aneta Sablik.
- "Story of a Heart" is a cover of the song originally performed by Benny Andersson's solo band.
- "No More Tears on the Dancefloor" is a cover of the Anders|Fahrenkrog song.
- "I Will Love Again" is a cover of the song originally performed by Lara Fabian.

== Charts and certifications ==
=== Weekly charts ===
Chart (2017)	Peak position
Australian Albums (ARIA)	46
Belgian Albums (Ultratop Flanders)	20
Irish Albums (Official Charts)	10
New Zealand Heatseeker Albums (RMNZ)	10
Scottish Albums (Official Charts)	1
UK Albums (Official Charts)	2
UK Independent Albums (Official Charts)	1

=== Year-end charts ===
Chart (2017)	Position
UK Albums (OCC)	59

=== Certifications ===
Region	Certification	Certified units/sales
United Kingdom (BPI)	Gold	100,000^{‡}
^{‡} Sales+streaming figures based on certification alone.

== Crying at the Disco reissue ==
Tears on the Dancefloor: Crying at the Disco

Studio album (reissue) by Steps
- Released: 27 October 2017
- Recorded: October 2016–August 2017
- Genres: Europop; dance-pop; electropop; disco
- Length: 52:16
- Labels: Absolute; Fascination
- Producers: The Alias; Carl Ryden; Brian Rawling; 7th Heaven; Adam Turner; Club Junkies; Rescue Rangerz; Porl Young; DJ David; David Chamberlin; Gordon Pogoda; Gloria Sklerov

Steps chronology
Tears on the Dancefloor (2017)	Tears on the Dancefloor: Crying at the Disco (2017)	Party on the Dancefloor (2018)

Singles from Tears on the Dancefloor: Crying at the Disco
- 1. "Dancing with a Broken Heart" Released: 19 September 2017

Tears on the Dancefloor: Crying at the Disco is the reissue of British group Steps fifth studio album Tears on the Dancefloor (2017), with several new recordings. On 18 September 2017, Steps announced that the album would be reissued on 27 October with five new songs, including a Christmas track, as well as previously unreleased remixes of "Happy", "Glitter & Gold" and "I Will Love Again", and titled Tears on the Dancefloor: Crying at the Disco.

=== Track listing ===
Tears on the Dancefloor (Crying At the Disco Deluxe Edition)
No.	Title	Writer(s)	Producer(s)	Length
1.	"Dancing with a Broken Heart"	Delta Goodrem; Vince Pizzinga; John Shanks	Carl Ryden	3:29
2.	"Scared of the Dark"	Carl Ryden; Fiona Bevan	The Alias; Ryden	3:46
3.	"September Sun"	Barry Stone; Julian Gingell	The Alias	4:19
4.	"Neon Blue" (Radio Mix)	Ryden; Bevan	The Alias; Ryden	3:26
5.	"You Make Me Whole"	Ina Wroldsen; Wayne Hector; Ben Kohn, Tom Barnes & Pete Kelleher	The Alias	3:42
6.	"Story of a Heart"	Benny Andersson; Björn Ulvaeus	The Alias	4:16
7.	"Fool for You"	Ryden; Bevan	Ryden	3:31
8.	"Happy"	Steve Mac; Wroldsen	The Alias	3:37
9.	"No More Tears on the Dancefloor"	Carl Falk; Darren Hayes	The Alias	3:47
10.	"Beautiful Battlefield"	Gordon Pogoda; Gloria Sklerov; David Chamberlin	David Chamberlin; Gordon Pogoda; Gloria Sklerov; The Alias	3:21
11.	"Firefly"	Mac; Wroldsen	The Alias	3:26
12.	"Space Between Us"	Stone; Gingell	The Alias	4:16
13.	"Glitter & Gold"	Stone; Gingell	The Alias	3:36
14.	"I Will Love Again"	Mark Taylor; Paul Barry	Brian Rawling	3:44
Total length:				52:16

Digital / Vinyl Bonus Tracks
No.	Title	Writer(s)	Producer(s)	Length
15.	"Dear Santa"	Gingell; Stone; Una Healy	The Alias	3:03
16.	"Scared of the Dark" (Acoustic)	Ryden; Bevan	The Alias; Ryden	4:01
17.	"Dancing With a Broken Heart" (7th Heaven Radio Mix)	Goodrem; Pizzinga; Shanks	The Alias; 7th Heaven	3:29
18.	"Story of a Heart" (7th Heaven Radio Mix)	Andersson; Ulvaeus	The Alias; 7th Heaven	3:33
19.	"Neon Blue" (Adam Turner Radio Edit)	Ryden; Bevan	The Alias; Ryden; Adam Turner	4:05
20.	"Scared of the Dark" (7th Heaven Radio Mix)	Ryden; Bevan	The Alias; Ryden; 7th Heaven	4:24
21.	"Happy" (Club Junkies Radio Mix)	Mac; Wroldsen	The Alias; Club Junkies	3:37
22.	"Glitter & Gold" (Rescue Rangerz Radio Mix)	Stone; Gingell	The Alias; Rescue Rangerz	4:00
23.	"I Will Love Again" (Porl Young Radio Mix)	Taylor; Barry	Rawling; Porl Young	3:57
24.	"Tears on the Dancefloor" (DJ David Strong 7th Heaven Medley)	Falk; Hayes	The Alias; DJ David; 7th Heaven	7:19
Total length:				93:55

Notes

- "Dancing with a Broken Heart" is a cover of the song originally performed by Delta Goodrem.
- "You Make Me Whole" is a cover of the song originally performed by Zoe Zana and later by Aneta Sablik & Anna Naklab.
- "Story of a Heart" is a cover of the song originally performed by Benny Andersson's solo band.
- "No More Tears on the Dancefloor" is a cover of the Anders|Fahrenkrog song.
- "I Will Love Again" is a cover of the song originally performed by Lara Fabian.
- "Tears on the Dancefloor" is a medley of the 7th Heaven Remixes of "Scared of the Dark", "Story of a Heart", "Neon Blue" and "Dancing with a Broken Heart".

=== Charts ===
Chart (2017)	Peak position
Scottish Albums (Official Charts)	6
UK Albums (Official Charts)	8
UK Independent Albums (Official Charts)	1

== Release history ==
List of release dates, showing country, format, label and references
Country	Date	Format	Label	Ref.
United Kingdom	21 April 2017	Digital download	Steps Music LLP	
United Kingdom	21 April 2017	Limited edition neon-blue vinyl	Steps Music LLP	
United Kingdom	21 April 2017	Limited edition signed CD	Steps Music LLP	
United States	21 April 2017	Digital download	Steps Music LLP	
France	21 April 2017	Digital download	Steps Music LLP	
United Kingdom	27 October 2017	'Crying At The Disco' deluxe digital download	Steps Music LLP	

== See also ==
- List of UK Album Downloads Chart number ones of the 2010s
