= Claire Richards =

English singer and songwriter (born 1977)

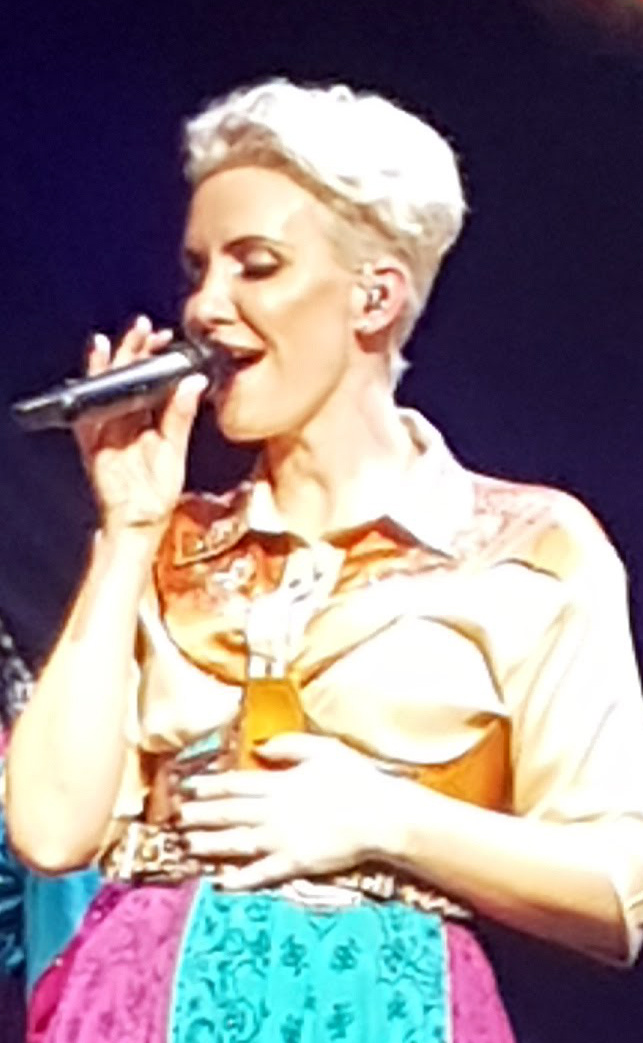
- Richards performing at Newcastle in 2017
- Born: Claire Anne Richards; 17 August 1977 (age 49); Hillingdon, London, England
- Occupations: Singer; songwriter; television presenter
- Years active: 1995–present
- Spouses: Mark Webb (m. 2003; div. 2005) Reece Hill (m. 2008)
- Children: 2
- Musical career
- Genres: Pop; electropop
- Instrument: Vocals
- Labels: AVEX, Jive, WEA, Sony, Steps, Warner
- Member of: Steps
- Formerly of: TSD; H & Claire
- Website: clairerichards.co.uk

Claire Hill (née Richards, born 17 August 1977) is an English singer and member of the pop group Steps. As a solo artist, Richards has released two studio albums: her debut, My Wildest Dreams, was released in 2019 and Euphoria, a covers album, was released in 2023.

Richards was a contestant on the second series of Popstar to Operastar before being voted off in the semi-finals. On 3 January 2013, Richards entered Celebrity Big Brother and came in fourth place. From April to June 2014, she was a regular panellist on Loose Women. Richards took part in the fourth series of The Masked Singer UK and was unmasked as “Knitting”.

== Early life ==
Richards began her career in the pop trio TSD. They had little success and were dropped by their record label Avex after the release of their second single "Baby I Love You". She went on to work as a receptionist for seven months, winning the temporary worker of the month award for May 1997.

== Career ==
=== 1997–2001: Early career with Steps ===
Richards auditioned for the lineup that would become Steps. She was offered a place in the group on the condition that she lost weight. Steps were formed by Steve Crosby and Barry Upton (writers of "5, 6, 7, 8") alongside manager Tim Byrne after auditioning hopefuls who answered an ad in The Stage newspaper. She joined the group in 1997 along with Ian "H" Watkins, Lisa Scott-Lee, Faye Tozer and Lee Latchford-Evans, and the band enjoyed considerable popularity across the world over the next five years.

=== 2002–2011: H & Claire and presenting ===
After Richards and her groupmate Ian "H" Watkins resigned during the last leg of Steps' 2001 Gold Tour, the two continued singing as the duo H & Claire. The pair experienced success with their debut single "DJ", which reached No. 3 on the UK Singles Chart, and their next two singles, which both charted in the top 10. While the duo had some initial success, their album Another You, Another Me, which was released in 2002, did not chart high and entered the UK album chart at number 58 and falling to number 97 on its second week. Richards also co hosted alongside Brian Dowling and Tess Daly on SMTV Live in 2002. She took a break from singing to plan her wedding to Steps dancer Mark Webb. H & Claire disbanded in 2003. After leaving her music career, Richards wanted to take a break from music and concentrate on other projects; she was set to release a debut solo album but due to falling pregnant Richards decided to not pursue music any further. In 2013, she announced on Twitter that there was a possibility of her producing a solo album to the success of Steps.

It was announced in May 2011 that Richards would be taking part in the second series of Popstar to Operastar making it her first major high-profile appearance in nearly ten years. The series started on ITV on 5 June. She appeared on OK! TV on 6 June to promote the show. Despite a much-praised performance of the Queen of the Night aria from Wolfgang Amadeus Mozart's The Magic Flute in the semi-final, she lost out on a place in the final to Cheryl Baker.

Richards was a contestant on eleventh series of Celebrity Big Brother and came fourth place as the show ended on 25 January 2013. On 1 and 7 April 2014, she was a guest panellist on the ITV lunchtime chat show Loose Women. Following this she became a permanent panellist, making her debut on 10 April 2014. She subsequently made a further seven appearances, with her last being on 23 June 2014. On 8 August 2017, she made a cameo appearance as herself on the BBC Scotland soap opera River City.

Richards released her first solo material, a cover of the Steps track "One for Sorrow", on 30 July 2015 via her official SoundCloud. The acoustic version of the track was recorded for an event honouring Steps' producer Pete Waterman. The track was arranged and produced by Steve Anderson with whom Richards was now working on a full album. In September 2015, after much fan demand, Richards released a stripped-back version of "Deeper Shade of Blue". The track, which was recorded in one take was released on Amazon Music, iTunes and streaming services on 4 September 2015.

=== 2011–2017: Reformation of Steps ===
Steps reformed in May 2011 for a four-part documentary series on Sky Living titled Steps: Reunion. The series started airing on 28 September, following an announcement of a second greatest hits album, The Ultimate Collection, that was released on 10 October 2011. The album entered the UK Albums Chart at number one, becoming the band's third album to achieve this feat. The second series of Steps: Reunion titled "Steps: On the Road Again" aired on Sky Living in April 2012; the series followed the band as they embarked on their sellout 30-date The Ultimate Tour in the UK and Ireland. On 24 September 2012, the group confirmed they would release their fourth studio album Light Up The World on 12 November 2012, alongside a six-date Christmas tour, starting from 30 November and ending on 5 December. The group reformed for a second time on 1 January 2017 in celebration of their 20th anniversary, and later announced their fifth studio album Tears on the Dancefloor, which was released in April 2017 and entered the charts at number 2. On 5 March 2017, the group confirmed the release of the new album, alongside its lead single, "Scared of the Dark", and a 22-date tour, Party on the Dancefloor. A deluxe edition of the album, titled Tears on the Dancefloor: Crying at the Disco, was released on 27 October.

In November 2017, Tozer announced that the reunion was no longer just a 20th-anniversary celebration and that the group intends to continue after their 2018 Summer of Steps tour. In April 2018, Richards announced that following their summer tour, they would begin work on their sixth studio album. In February 2019, Richards announced the group would begin recording their next album during the summer months.

On 7 September 2020, via their social media accounts, Steps announced the release date of their album entitled What the Future Holds. The album was released on 27 November of the same year, with pre-orders available from 8 September. The next day, they confirmed a new 14-date UK tour (with special guest Sophie Ellis-Bextor) starting in November 2021. The first single from the album was the Greg Kurstin-and-Sia-penned "What the Future Holds", released on 9 September 2020. It was followed by "Something in Your Eyes" on 27 October 2020. "To the Beat of My Heart" was released as the album's third single in January 2021.

The first single of What the Future Holds Pt. 2 was confirmed as a reworked version of "Heartbreak in This City" featuring Michelle Visage.

=== 2018–present: My Wildest Dreams and Euphoria ===
It was announced on 3 August 2018 that Richards was to release her debut solo album, My Wildest Dreams on 2 November 2018. It was preceded by the lead single, "On My Own", which was released on 6 August. It was announced on 8 October 2018, via her official Twitter, that the album had been delayed until 1 February 2019. The album reached No. 9 in the UK Albums Chart and was promoted with a small theatre tour across venues in the UK.

In February 2023, Richards participated as "Knitting" on the fourth series of The Masked Singer. In June 2023, H & Claire came together for a special appearance at Pride Cymru 2023, delighting fans with their one-off performance.

On 28 June 2023, Richards announced that her second solo studio album, Euphoria, would be released in August 2023. On the same day, Richards released the album's lead single "I Surrender", a cover of the 2002 Celine Dion track from her album A New Day Has Come. On 26 July 2023, Richards released a cover of the 1978 ABBA single "Summer Night City", with Erasure lead singer Andy Bell, as the second single from Euphoria. The album peaked at number 2 on the UK Albums and UK Physical Albums charts, respectively, and at number 1 on the UK Albums Downloads, Sales and Vinyl charts.

== Personal life ==
Richards married her first husband Mark Webb, a backing dancer with Steps, in 2003. The couple divorced in 2005. Richards' first child, Charlie, was born on 8 May 2007. In January 2008, Richards announced her engagement to Reece Hill and they were married on 1 November 2008. Richards gave birth to a girl named Daisy on 29 December 2009.

She possesses the vocal range of a soprano.

On 13 September 2008, Richards performed "Tragedy" on the show Everybody Dance Now without the other members of Steps. Richards appeared on Celebrity MasterChef on 25 June 2009 as part of the programme's "comeback" week. Claire Richards: My Big Fat Wedding, a programme following Claire on her journey to lose weight before her wedding, was shown on BBC Three in May 2009. The programme featured her wedding and a reunion of all Steps members and drew an audience of over 763,000. Richards released a fitness DVD Five Step Fat Attack on 26 December 2008.

== Discography ==
=== Studio albums ===
List of studio albums, with selected details and chart positions
Title	Album details	Peak chart positions			
Title	Album details	UK	BEL (FL)	BEL (WA)	SCO
My Wildest Dreams	Released: 1 February 2019; Label: Sony; Formats: CD, digital download	9	—	—	7
Euphoria	Released: 25 August 2023; Label: Demon Music Group; Formats: CD, cassette, vinyl, digital download	2	28	17	3

=== Singles ===
List of promotional singles
Title	Year	Peak chart positions	Album
Title	Year	UK DL	Album
"One for Sorrow" (acoustic version)	2015	—	Non-album singles
"Deeper Shade of Blue" (piano version)	2015	—	Non-album singles
"On My Own"	2018	53	My Wildest Dreams
"End Before We Start"	2018	—	My Wildest Dreams
"My Heart Is Heading Home (This Christmas)"	2018	—	My Wildest Dreams
"Shame On You"	2019	—	My Wildest Dreams
"7 Billion"	2019	—	My Wildest Dreams
"I Surrender"	2023	64	Euphoria
"Summer Night City" (with Andy Bell)	2023	85	Euphoria
"No More Tears (Enough Is Enough)" (with Delta Goodrem)	2023	46	Euphoria

=== Music videos ===
Title	Year	Director(s)
"On My Own"	2018	
"End Before We Start"	2018	
"I Surrender"	2023	Joseph Sinclair
"No More Tears (Enough Is Enough)"	2023	John Taylor
