= Party on the Dancefloor Tour =

2017 concert tour by Steps

- Tour by Steps
- Promotional poster for the tour
- Associated album: Tears on the Dancefloor and Crying at the Disco
- Start date: 12 November 2017
- End date: 10 December 2017
- Legs: 1
- No. of shows: 1 in the Republic of Ireland; 21 in the United Kingdom; 22 in total
- Supporting acts: Vengaboys; Max Restaino
- Attendance: 250,000
- Website: Steps Official - Live Events

Steps concert chronology
- Christmas with Steps (2012); Party on the Dancefloor Tour (2017); Summer of Steps Tour (2018)

The Party on the Dancefloor Tour was the eighth concert tour by British group Steps. It was launched in support of their fifth studio album, Tears on the Dancefloor (2017) and its subsequent deluxe edition. It began on 12 November 2017 in Belfast, Northern Ireland at the SSE Arena and concluded on 10 December 2017 in Cardiff, Wales at the Motorpoint Arena. The tour was first announced in March 2017, consisting of dates in Europe.

== Background ==
Steps reunited in 2011 for a four-part documentary series produced by Sky Living. It predominantly explored their highly publicised and acrimonious split on Boxing Day in 2001, as well as revealing what each member had been doing during the previous ten years and the truth, causes and effects of their disbandment. It further showed how they could repair their professional, and personal, relationships as a five-piece for the release of their second greatest hits album, The Ultimate Collection (2011), and formal discussions of officially reforming. The positive response to the album led to the announcement of a reunion arena tour, The Ultimate Tour, in April 2012, and their fourth studio/first Christmas album, Light Up the World, later that year. On 28 November 2016, it was revealed that Steps would be reuniting for a New Year's Eve performance G-A-Y to celebrate twenty years since their debut.

On 6 March 2017, Steps confirmed that their fifth studio album, Tears on the Dancefloor, would be released on 21 April in the United Kingdom and be preceded by the lead single, "Scared of the Dark", on 10 March; they also announced the accompanying Party on the Dancefloor Tour for November and December 2017. The album, which peaked at number-two on the UK Albums Chart, number-one on the UK Independent Albums Chart and was certified silver by the British Phonographic Industry for shipments exceeding 60,000 three weeks after its release, generated two additional singles, "Story of a Heart" and "Neon Blue". On 18 September 2017, Steps announced that the album would be reissued on 27 October with five new songs, including a Christmas track, as well as previously unreleased remixes, and called Tears on the Dancefloor: Crying at the Disco.

== Tickets ==
The Party on the Dancefloor Tour was the group's first series of concerts since their Christmas with Steps tour in December 2012. The announcement confirmed that it would be visiting various conference halls, exhibition centres and arenas in the Republic of Ireland and the United Kingdom of Great Britain and Northern Ireland, kicking off at the only date for the former at the 3Arena in Dublin on 13 November and fourteen dates across the latter before concluding at Manchester Arena in Manchester on 2 December; it also includes two dates in London at The O2 Arena and Wembley Arena on 24 and 25 November, respectively. Pre-sale tickets went on sale on 7 March, with general sale tickets going on sale three days later on 10 March, and were made available to purchase through AXS and Ticketmaster, with ticket prices ranging from £37.36 to £113.30 including service charges and administration fees.

On 13 March, the group added five more dates to revisit Belfast, Manchester, Newcastle, Liverpool and Glasgow. The tickets for the five additional dates were made available for pre-sale the following day and released for general sale on 16 March, increasing from fifteen to twenty tour dates. Two more dates were later added to revisit Cardiff and Birmingham on 9 and 10 November, respectively, bringing the total tour dates to twenty-two.

== Critical reception ==
For the opening night concert in Belfast, Sarah Scott writing for Belfast Live awarded the show four out five stars. She wrote that the group were "back with a bang" and noted the positive audience reaction to "5,6,7,8", commenting that "fans went crazy for the old school classic in such a manner you would think it was still in the charts." Scott praised the support act the Vengaboys and said that the tour served as a reminder that Steps should never have disbanded. She concluded by writing that although fans knew they would have a good night, it was better than she expected it to be.

For the concert at 3Arena in Dublin, Louise Bruton writing for The Irish Times awarded the show five out of five stars. Describing it as one of the best pop concerts of the year and likening the high production values to those of Kylie Minogue, Bruton noted that Steps sang live throughout the show and that each band member "a chance to show off". She added that small touches such as Ian "H" Watkins being partnered with a male dancer and the group embracing each other during their rendition of "Heartbeat" considering that they were not on speaking terms in 2009 "shows how far they've come." Bruton concluded by writing that for a pop band "to survive the 1990s is one thing but for a pop group to come back 20 years later with a top-10 album and a slick tour like this is little short of a miracle," and called the church wedding procession during the closing song "Tragedy" the "best thing ever."

== Set list ==
The following set list is representative of the show in Newcastle at the Metro Radio Arena on 20 November 2017. It may not represent the setlist from all of the shows.

1. "Scared of the Dark"
2. "Deeper Shade of Blue"
3. "Chain Reaction"
4. "Happy"
5. "Stomp"
6. "Better Best Forgotten" / "Last Thing on My Mind" (Medley)
7. "No More Tears (Enough Is Enough)" / "No More Tears on the Dancefloor" (Medley)
8. "Dancing with a Broken Heart"
9. "When I Said Goodbye"
10. "5,6,7,8"
11. "Better the Devil You Know"
12. "It's the Way You Make Me Feel"
13. "Heartbeat"
14. "Story of a Heart"
15. "Summer Of Love" / "Paradise Lost" / "Despacito" (Medley)
16. "Neon Blue"
17. "Love U More" / "You'll Be Sorry" / "After the Love Has Gone" (Medley)
18. "Love's Got a Hold on My Heart"
19. "One for Sorrow"

Encore

20. "Tragedy"

== Shows ==
List of concerts, showing date, city, country, venue, opening acts, tickets sold, number of available tickets and gross revenue
| Date | City | Country | Venue | Opening acts | Attendance | Revenue |
Europe
| 12 November 2017 | Belfast | Northern Ireland | SSE Arena | Max Restaino; Vengaboys | — | — |
| 13 November 2017 | Dublin | Ireland | 3Arena | Max Restaino; Vengaboys | — | — |
| 14 November 2017 | Belfast | Northern Ireland | SSE Arena | Max Restaino; Vengaboys | — | — |
| 16 November 2017 | Glasgow | Scotland | The SSE Hydro | Max Restaino; Vengaboys | — | — |
| 17 November 2017 | Aberdeen | Scotland | GE Oil and Gas Arena | Max Restaino; Vengaboys | — | — |
| 18 November 2017 | Liverpool | England | Echo Arena | Max Restaino; Vengaboys | — | — |
| 20 November 2017 | Newcastle | England | Metro Radio Arena | Max Restaino; Vengaboys | — | — |
| 21 November 2017 | Leeds | England | First Direct Arena | Max Restaino; Vengaboys | — | — |
| 23 November 2017 | Brighton | England | Brighton Centre | Max Restaino; Vengaboys | — | — |
| 24 November 2017 | London | England | The O_{2} Arena | Max Restaino; Vengaboys | 14,412 / 14,759 | $870,010 |
| 25 November 2017 | London | England | Wembley Arena | Max Restaino; Vengaboys | — | — |
| 27 November 2017 | Bournemouth | England | Bournemouth International Centre | Max Restaino; Vengaboys | — | — |
| 28 November 2017 | Nottingham | England | Motorpoint Arena | Max Restaino; Vengaboys | — | — |
| 29 November 2017 | Cardiff | Wales | Motorpoint Arena | Max Restaino; Vengaboys | — | — |
| 1 December 2017 | Birmingham | England | Barclaycard Arena | Max Restaino; Vengaboys | — | — |
| 2 December 2017 | Manchester | England | Manchester Arena | Max Restaino; Vengaboys | 23,383 / 25,234 | $1,290,530 |
| 3 December 2017 | Manchester | England | Manchester Arena | Max Restaino; Vengaboys | 23,383 / 25,234 | $1,290,530 |
| 5 December 2017 | Newcastle | England | Metro Radio Arena | Max Restaino; Vengaboys | — | — |
| 6 December 2017 | Liverpool | England | Echo Arena | Max Restaino; Vengaboys | — | — |
| 7 December 2017 | Glasgow | Scotland | The SSE Hydro | Max Restaino; Vengaboys | 11,027 / 11,190 | $603,840 |
| 9 December 2017 | Birmingham | England | Genting Arena | Max Restaino; Vengaboys | — | — |
| 10 December 2017 | Cardiff | Wales | Motorpoint Arena Cardiff | Max Restaino; Vengaboys | — | — |
| Total | | | | | 48,822 / 51,183 (95%) | $2,764,380 |
