= Scared of the Dark =

2017 single by Steps

Single by Steps

from the album Tears on the Dancefloor
- Released: 10 March 2017
- Genre: Disco
- Length: 3:46
- Label: Steps Music LLP; Fascination; Absolute
- Songwriters: Carl Ryden; Fiona Bevan
- Producers: The Alias; Carl Ryden

Steps singles chronology
| "Light Up the World" (2012) | "Scared of the Dark" (2017) | "Story of a Heart" (2017) |

Music video
- "Scared of the Dark" on YouTube

"Scared of the Dark" is a song recorded by British group Steps for their fifth studio album, Tears on the Dancefloor (2017). On 6 March 2017, the group announced their twentieth anniversary celebrations in the form of a new single, album and accompanying tour. "Scared of the Dark" premiered on The Ken Bruce Show on BBC Radio 2 on 9 March, and was released as the lead single from the album the following day. It is a disco song written by Carl Ryden and Fiona Bevan and performed mostly by band members Claire Richards and Faye Tozer. It garnered rave reviews from music critics, many of whom praised Steps for deliberately not conforming to current musical trends and for sticking to their original sound but with a modern feel. Within twelve hours of release, it reached number one on the iTunes Store in the United Kingdom, and debuted at number 37 on the UK Singles Chart.

== Background and release ==
On 28 November 2016, it was announced that Steps would be performing at G-A-Y on New Year's Eve to celebrate twenty years since they formed in 1997, with the Official Charts Company speculating that the group would mark the anniversary with celebrations throughout 2017. On 6 March 2017, the group confirmed the release of a new single, album and tour to commemorate twenty years of Steps. They confirmed the title of the lead single to be "Scared of the Dark" and that it would precede the parent album, Tears on the Dancefloor, which was released on 21 April 2017, and be supported by the accompanying Party on the Dancefloor Tour which is near its end. The single premiered on 9 March 2017 on The Ken Bruce Show on BBC Radio 2, and was released at midnight on 10 March 2017 on iTunes, Spotify and Apple Music. Following the premiere, Bruce stated that the group are "on form". The group released an acoustic version of the song on iTunes on 13 April 2017.

== Composition ==
Written by Carl Ryden and Fiona Bevan, "Scared of the Dark" is a disco song with a duration of three minutes and forty-six seconds. Claire Richards and Faye Tozer perform the lead vocals, with Lisa Scott-Lee singing one verse, while Lee Latchford-Evans and Ian "H" Watkins provide background vocals. The group recorded each of their parts separately due to personal schedules as well as to keep their twentieth anniversary plans a secret from the public and the media. Scott-Lee revealed that she flew to the United Kingdom from her home in Dubai in the United Arab Emirates to record her vocals for "Scared of the Dark" and did not see her band members in the process, a sentiment that Latchford-Evans echoed. She recalled how the group used to record their vocals around a microphone in a booth together and how the process appeared to have changed in the twenty years since their split in 2001 where it is now done separately.

The track begins with slow strings, deceptively creating the impression that it is a ballad. Richards transitions from the verse to chorus with the lyrics "Say you're mine and stay by my side, don't say you're leaving. Don't turn out the lights, I'll scream, I'll scream, I'll scream," after which it transforms into an up-tempo disco track. All five members perform the chorus, singing "Don't let the darkness come and hold me, I need someone cause I can't be lonely tonight. Come on baby, come and take me in your arms, I'll never be scared of the dark." Matt Bagwell of The Huffington Post described the lyrics as being "straight out of the 'How To Do ABBA' songwriting handbook."

== Critical reception ==
"Scared of the Dark" garnered rave reviews from contemporary music critics, with many praising it for being deliberately off-trend. Shaun Kitchener for the Daily Express praised the group for recording a song which is not trying too hard to fit in with the current trends in the music industry, writing "It's exactly what Steps should be releasing in this era: big, dramatic pop music that doesn't try to be too clever or doesn't try to chase any particular trend (no guest rappers here, mercifully)." He continued to described "Scared of the Dark" as a "dramatic floorfiller" with an "ace" chorus, and praised Richards and Tozer for their "reliably strong vocals". Shaun would later go on to write the book for the Steps’ musical Here and Now. Idolator's Mike Wass echoed a similar sentiment, writing that it being off-trend is what makes it appealing because the group are making music which their fans want to hear, not what makes them conformist to current musical trends. The Huffington Post writer Matt Bagwell wrote that the song "harks back to that golden age of pop, but with a modern day sheen" and praised Steps for "wisely [avoiding]" not to sound too cool or too current. Writing for Entertainment Focus, Ellwood Hughes wrote that it, "is a classic slice of Steps with a modern twist and it fits effortlessly into their hits-packed back catalogue."

Hannah Flint for OK! similarly praised Steps for sticking to their original "disco-dance-pop" sound, and noted that the strong and positive reception from fans had resulted in them wishing that Steps and "Scared of the Dark" was the United Kingdom's entry for the Eurovision Song Contest 2017 instead of "Never Give Up on You" by Lucie Jones. Free Radio presenter Andy Goulding tweeted "The new Steps tune is the greatest Eurovision song we never entered! Why did nobody think of it? We would've won!" In response, Richards stated that the group had been approached for Eurovision "every year, for years", but they had declined each time because it is "too political"; Tozer added that they did not want to tarnish their legacy and that they would rather watch it as a spectator than partake as a competitor. Digital Spy writer Ian Sandswell described the song as an "absolute banger", while Ben Travis of The Independent wrote that it "sounds like it was zapped through a wormhole right from 1999."

== Chart performance ==
Following its release at midnight on 10 March 2017, "Scared of the Dark" reached number-one on the iTunes Store in the United Kingdom within twelve hours, displacing Ed Sheeran and Coldplay & The Chainsmokers to numbers two and three with "Galway Girl" and "Something Just Like This", respectively. It debuted at number 37 on the UK Singles Chart and number three on the UK Indie Chart on 23 March 2017. The song peaked at number two on the UK Indie Chart on 4 May 2017. It also debuted at number six on the Scottish Singles Chart.

== Promotion ==
Steps performed "Scared of the Dark" live for the first time on Tonight at the London Palladium at the London Palladium on 19 April 2017. Two days later on 21 April, they performed the song live on This Morning, and again on 22 April on All Round to Mrs. Brown's. They also performed on Strictly Come Dancing's Halloween Results Show on 29 October 2017.

== Formats and track listings ==
Digital download - Remix EP

1. "Scared of the Dark" (Wideboys Step It Up Radio Mix) – 3:44
2. "Scared of the Dark" (Wideboys in the Shadows Vocal Mix) – 3:46
3. "Scared of the Dark" (7th Heaven Radio Mix) – 4:24
4. "Scared of the Dark" (Wideboys Dancefloor Radio Mix) – 3:29
5. "Scared of the Dark" (Wideboys in the Shadows Dub) – 3:44

Digital download - Acoustic

1. "Scared of the Dark" (Acoustic) – 4:01

Digital download - "Story of a Heart" Remix EP

1. "Story of a Heart" (Cutmore Radio Mix) – 3:31
2. "Story of a Heart" (7th Heaven Club Mix) – 7:38
3. "Story of a Heart" (Cutmore Club Mix) – 4:51
4. "Scared of the Dark" (7th Heaven Club Mix) – 6:56
5. "Scared of the Dark" (Wideboys Step It Up Club Mix) – 4:26

Tears On The Dancefloor - The Singles Collection
CD1 - "Scared Of The Dark"

1. "Scared Of The Dark" – 3:46
2. "Scared Of The Dark" (Acoustic) – 4:01
3. "Scared Of The Dark" (7th Heaven Club Mix) – 6:56
4. "Scared Of The Dark" (7th Heaven Radio Mix) – 4:25
5. "Scared Of The Dark" (Wideboys Dancefloor Club Mix) – 4:28
6. "Scared Of The Dark" (Wideboys Dancefloor Radio Mix) – 3:28
7. "Scared Of The Dark" (Wideboys Dancefloor Dub) – 4:27
8. "Scared Of The Dark" (Wideboys In The Shadows Vocal Mix) – 3:45
9. "Scared Of The Dark" (Wideboys In The Shadows Dub) – 3:45
10. "Scared Of The Dark" (Wideboys Step It Up Club Mix) – 4:25
11. "Scared Of The Dark" (Wideboys Step It Up Radio Mix) – 3:43
12. "Scared Of The Dark" (Wideboys Step It Up Dub) – 4:25
13. "You Make Me Whole" (Porl Young Radio Edit) – 4:12
14. "You Make Me Whole" (Porl Young Club Mix) – 7:21

== Credits and personnel ==
- Lead vocals – Faye Tozer, Claire Richards, Lisa Scott-Lee
- Background vocals – Lee Latchford Evans, Ian "H" Watkins
- Songwriting – Carl Ryden, Fiona Bevan
- Production – The Alias, Carl Ryden
- Keyboards and programming – Julian Gingell, Barry Stone, Carl Ryden
- Guitars – James Nisbet
- Mixing – Pete Hofmann

Credits adapted from the liner notes of Tears on the Dancefloor.

== Charts ==
| Chart (2017) | Peak position |
|---|---|
| Scottish Singles Sales (Official Charts) | 6 |
| UK Singles (Official Charts) | 37 |
| UK Independent (Official Charts) | 2 |

== Certifications ==
| Region | Certification | Certified units/sales |
|---|---|---|
| United Kingdom (BPI) | Silver | 200,000^{‡} |
^{‡} Sales+streaming figures based on certification alone.
