= Faye Tozer =

British singer (born 1975)

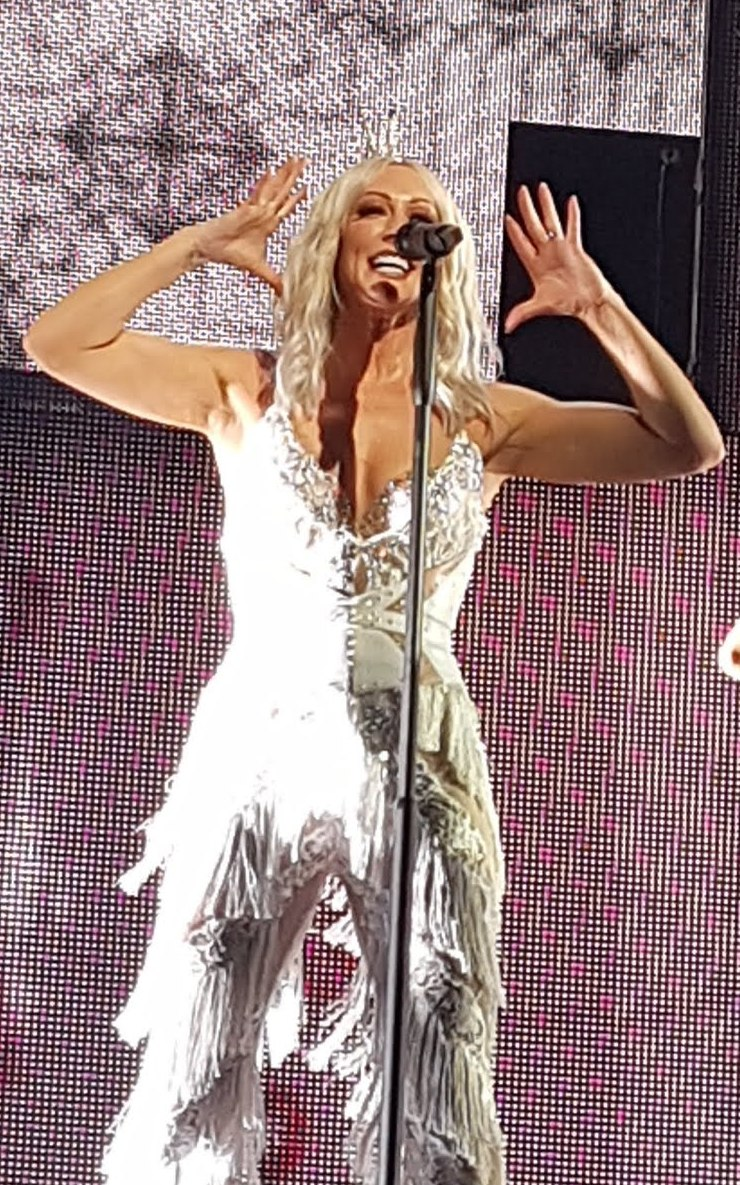
- Tozer performing in 2017

Background information
- Born: Faye Louise Tozer; 14 November 1975 (age 51); Northampton, England
- Origin: Dunstable, Bedfordshire, England
- Genres: Pop, musical theatre
- Occupations: Singer, songwriter, dancer, actress
- Years active: 1997–present
- Member of: Steps
- Website: www.stepsofficial.co.uk/faye

Faye Louise Tozer Smith (born 14 November 1975) is an English singer and actress, best known as a member of the pop group Steps.

== Career ==
=== Music ===
Steps are a pop group that have had a series of charted singles between 1997 and 2020. Their name is based on a gimmick: each of their music videos are choreographed, and the dance steps are included with most of their single releases. Steps have sold over 22 million records, including 15 million albums.

During Steps' split Tozer returned to the pop charts once, duetting with Russell Watson. Their UK single "Someone Like You" charted at No. 10 in May 2002 and she joined him on his UK tour around the same time. In 2006, Tozer was featured as a guest vocalist for Plastic Cinema for two songs: "Take Me Under" and "Any Minute Now".

Steps reformed in May 2011 for a four-part documentary series on Sky Living titled Steps: Reunion. The series started airing on 28 September, following an announcement of a second greatest hits album, The Ultimate Collection, that was released on 10 October 2011. The album entered the charts at number one, becoming the band's third album to achieve this feat. The second series of Steps: Reunion titled "Steps: On the Road Again" aired on Sky Living in April 2012; the series followed the band as they embarked on their sellout 22-date UK tour. On 24 September 2012, the group confirmed they would release their fourth studio album Light Up the World on 12 November 2012, alongside a six-date Christmas tour, starting from 30 November and ending on 5 December. The group reformed for a second time on 1 January 2017 in celebration of their 20th anniversary, and later announced their fifth studio album Tears on the Dancefloor, which was released in April 2017 and entered the charts at number 2. On 5 March 2017, the group confirmed the release of the new album, alongside its lead single, "Scared of the Dark", and the 22-date Party on the Dancefloor Tour. A deluxe edition of the album, titled Tears on the Dancefloor: Crying at the Disco, was released on 27 October.

In November 2017, Tozer announced that the reunion was no longer just a 20th-anniversary celebration and that the group intends to continue after their 2018 Summer of Steps tour. On 7 September 2020, via their social media accounts, Steps announced the release date of their album entitled What the Future Holds. The album was released on 27 November of the same year, with pre-orders available from 8 September. The next day, they confirmed a new 14-date UK tour (with special guest Sophie Ellis-Bextor) starting in November 2021. The first single from the album was the Greg Kurstin-and-Sia-penned "What the Future Holds", released on 9 September 2020. It was followed by "Something in Your Eyes" on 27 October 2020. "To the Beat of My Heart" was released as the album's third single in January 2021.

The first single of What the Future Holds Pt. 2 was confirmed as a reworked version of "Heartbreak in This City" featuring Michelle Visage.

=== Film and theatre ===
Tozer has combined a pop career with theatre work and acting. In 2004 she made her professional musical-theatre debut in a national tour of Andrew Lloyd Webber's one-woman musical Tell Me on a Sunday. She and Patsy Palmer alternated in the role. Tozer toured with the musical Love Shack, which also featured former pop singers Jon Lee and Noel Sullivan, and soon after starred as Jubilee Climax in a production of Saucy Jack and the Space Vixens at The Venue Leicester Square in London's West End.

In 2006 she toured in a production of Me and My Girl, acted in the film Lady Godiva Back in the Saddle and appeared in the charity fitness DVD The Allstar Workout. In 2007, Tozer appeared in a production of Dial M for Murder and in October began touring with the production Over the Rainbow – the Eva Cassidy Story playing Eva Cassidy. At Christmas 2007, she appeared in the pantomime Aladdin at the Theatre Royal, Newcastle.

Over Christmas 2008, Tozer played alongside X Factor finalist Ray Quinn in Aladdin, at the Broadway Theatre in Peterborough. Tozer has filmed roles in the independent films Kung Fu Flid and Mixed Up. In 2010, Tozer appeared in "In The Spotlight – Songs From The Musicals" which completed a UK tour, directed by Karen Edwards and choreographed by Tom Gribby. In December 2010 she starred in Aladdin at the Grove Theatre in her home town of Dunstable.

In 2011 Tozer starred alongside her fellow Steps group member Ian "H" Watkins in a UK premier tour of Rhinestone Mondays. The musical was the first Country and Western to be produced, with Tozer playing the part of Annie. In 2013 Tozer starred in the musical The Tailor-Made Man at the Arts Theatre in London's West End for a limited 8-week run. She played the part of silent movie star Marion Davies. Tozer has played the role of Miss Hedge in Everybody's Talking About Jamie in London's Apollo Theatre in the West End.

Tozer has also appeared in multiple pantomimes across the UK, most recently Robin Hood at Birmingham Hippodrome alongside Gok Wan, Matt Slack, Matt Cardle and Christopher Biggins.

On 5 December 2025, Tozer appeared as the celebrity guest star in Inside No. 9 Stage/Fright at The Alexandra, Birmingham.

In 2026, Tozer will play Mrs. Heron, Ms. Norbury, and Mrs. George in the UK tour of Mean Girls.

=== Television ===
Tozer appeared on the fifth series of Big Star's Little Star with her son Benjamin.

She also placed third in a celebrity edition of Four Weddings, losing out to Michelle Marsh.

In 2017, Tozer was one of four contestants on season 7, episode 8 of The Celebrity Chase, progressing to the episode's Final Chase.

From September 2018, Tozer participated in the sixteenth series of Strictly Come Dancing, where her professional dance partner was Giovanni Pernice. The couple were joint runners-up in the final.

Week No.	Dance/Song	Judges' score				Total	Result
Week No.	Dance/Song	Horwood	Bussell	Ballas	Tonioli*	Total	Result
1	Cha-cha-cha / "Lullaby"	7	8	7	7	29	No Elimination
2	Viennese Waltz / "It's a Man's Man's Man's World"	8	8	7	8	31	Safe
3	Quickstep / "You're the One That I Want"	9	9	9	9	36	Safe
4	Rumba / "Chandelier"	7	7	7	8	29	Safe
5	Foxtrot / "Just the Way You Are"	8	9	8	8	33	Safe
6	Jazz / "Fever"	9	10	10	10	39	Safe
7	Tango/ "Call Me"	9	10	9	10	38	Safe
8	Jive/ "Reet Petite"	9	9	8	10	36	Safe
9	Paso Doble/ "Unstoppable"	9	9	10	10	38	Safe
10	Waltz / "See the Day"; Lindy Hop-a-thon / "Do Your Thing"	9 Awarded	10; 6	10 extra	10 points	39; 45	Safe
11	Charleston/ "The Lonely Goatherd"	10	10	10	10	40	Safe
12	Samba/ "I Go to Rio"; Argentine Tango/ "La cumparsita"	9; 9	9; 10	9; 10	10; 10	37; 39	Safe
13	Viennese Waltz / "It's a Man's Man's Man's World"; Showdance / "Lullaby of Broadway"; Jazz / "Fever"	10; 10; 10	10; 10; 10	10; 10; 10	10; 10; 10	40; 40; 40	Runners-Up

- Green number indicates Faye & Giovanni were at the top of the leaderboard.
- Score awarded by guest judge Alfonso Ribeiro

She appeared on a celebrity special of the classic game show Catchphrase, with Sir Chris Hoy, Martine McCutcheon and hosted by Stephen Mulhern all trying to guess the familiar phrases.

== Discography ==
- "Someone Like You" (with Russell Watson) (2002), Decca – UK #10, IRE #46
- "Love Shack - The New Pop Musical" (2005)
- "Plastic Cinema" (2006)
- "Hello Young Lovers" (2019)

== Personal life ==
Tozer was born in Northampton but grew up in Dunstable in Bedfordshire. She attended Northfields Upper School, now All Saints Academy, Dunstable, in Chiltern house. She started English, Art, and Drama A-levels, but left at 17.

From 2002 to 2007, Tozer was married to her first husband, Jesper Irn.

On 24 February 2009, Tozer gave birth to her first child, named Benjamin Barrington Tozer-Smith.

On 5 December 2009, Tozer married Michael Smith in a ceremony at Beamish Hall, televised on an episode of Celebrity Four Weddings. and moved to Boldon, South Tyneside.
