= Ian "H" Watkins =

Welsh singer and actor (born 1976)

Ian Watkins
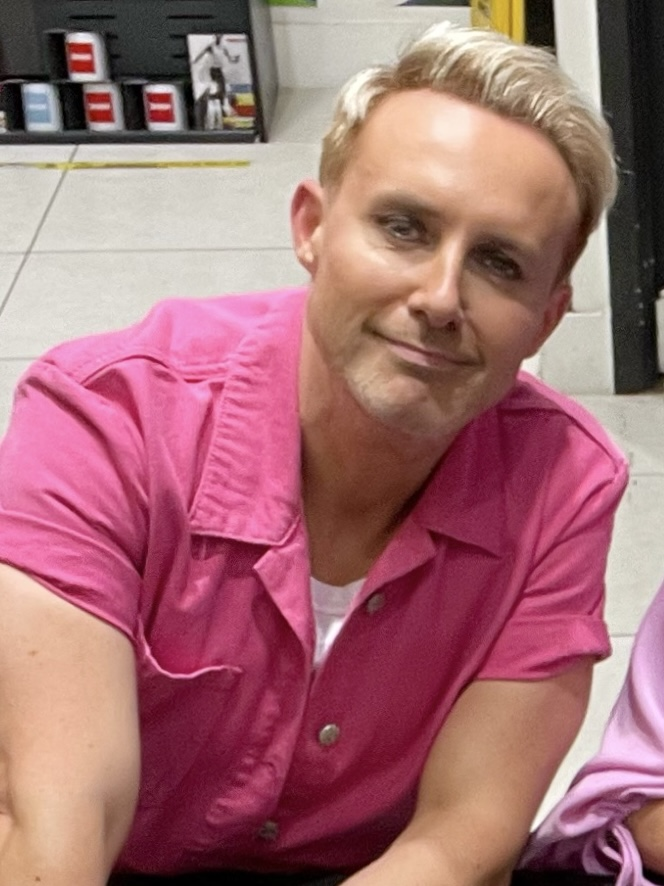
- Watkins in 2022
- Born: 8 May 1976 (age 50); Llwynypia, Mid Glamorgan, Wales
- Education: Treorchy Comprehensive School; Royal Academy of Music
- Occupations: Singer; actor
- Partner(s): Craig Ryder (2007–2017); Tom Hope (2020–present)
- Children: 2
- Musical career
- Genre: Pop
- Instrument: Vocals
- Years active: 1997–present
- Labels: Jive; Sony; Warner Music Group; Steps Recordings
- Member of: Steps
- Formerly of: H & Claire

Ian Watkins (born 8 May 1976), known by his stage name H, (Note: A nickname originating from his "hyperactive" personality.) is a Welsh singer, actor and reality TV contestant. He is a member of the British pop group Steps.

== Career ==
=== Steps ===
Before he joined Steps, Watkins worked as a Bluecoat at Pontins, then later as a Redcoat at Butlin's.

In May 1997, Watkins became a member of the British pop group Steps. Steps achieved a series of charting singles between 1997 and 2001 including two number-one singles in the UK, two number-one albums in the UK, 14 consecutive top 5 singles in the UK, and a string of hits throughout Europe. The group has sold over 20 million records worldwide, in addition to acquiring a BRIT Award nomination in 1999.

Steps reformed in May 2011 for a four-part documentary series on Sky Living titled Steps: Reunion. The series started airing on 28 September, following an announcement of a second greatest hits album, The Ultimate Collection, that was released on 10 October 2011. The album entered the charts at number one, becoming the band's third album to achieve this feat. The second series of Steps: Reunion titled "Steps: On the Road Again" aired on Sky Living in April 2012; the series followed the band as they embarked on their sellout 22-date UK tour. On 24 September 2012, the group confirmed they would release their fourth studio album Light Up the World on 12 November 2012, alongside a six-date Christmas tour, starting from 30 November and ending on 5 December. The group reformed for a second time on 1 January 2017 in celebration of their 20th anniversary, and later announced their fifth studio album Tears on the Dancefloor, which was released in April 2017 and entered the charts at number 2. On 5 March 2017, the group confirmed the release of the new album, alongside its lead single, "Scared of the Dark", and a 22-date tour, Party on the Dancefloor. A deluxe edition of the album, titled Tears on the Dancefloor: Crying at the Disco, was released on 27 October.

In November 2017, Faye Tozer announced that the reunion was no longer just a 20th-anniversary celebration and that the group intended to continue after their 2018 Summer of Steps tour. In April 2018, Claire Richards announced that following their summer tour, they would begin work on their sixth studio album. In February 2019, Richards announced the group would begin recording their next album during the summer months.

On 7 September 2020, via their social media accounts, Steps announced the release date of their album entitled What the Future Holds. The album was released on 27 November of the same year, with pre-orders available from 8 September. The next day, they confirmed a new 14-date UK tour (with special guest Sophie Ellis-Bextor) starting in November 2021. The first single from the album was "What the Future Holds", written by Greg Kurstin and Sia and released on 9 September 2020. It was followed by "Something in Your Eyes" on 27 October 2020. "To the Beat of My Heart" was released as the album's third single in January 2021.

The first single of What the Future Holds Pt. 2 was confirmed as a reworked version of "Heartbreak in This City" featuring Michelle Visage.

=== H and Claire ===
After Steps split in 2001, Watkins formed a duo, H & Claire, with fellow ex-Steps member Claire Richards. They released three singles and an album.

=== Musical theatre ===
After departing from H & Claire, he then decided to take a musical theatre course at the Royal Academy of Music. While taking the course he also appeared in Joseph and the Amazing Technicolor Dreamcoat and was filmed for a reality TV series, H-side Story, which followed him as he tried to make a new career as an actor. Watkins performed at Preston's Charter Theatre in the pantomime Cinderella in the role of Buttons. In summer 2007, he performed in the West End version of Fame. During Christmas 2007, he reprised his role as Buttons in the pantomime Cinderella at the Grimsby Auditorium. In July 2008, he played the Child Catcher in the UK tour of the musical Chitty Chitty Bang Bang at the Wales Millennium Centre in Cardiff Bay. He also played the role of 'Silly Billy' in pantomime Jack & The Beanstalk at the Southport Theatre from 10 December 2009 to 3 January 2010. Christmas 2010 saw his return to Grimsby as he performed in the pantomime Beauty and the Beast, playing the part of Muddles. In 2013, Watkins announced that he was returning to his role as Joseph in Joseph and the Amazing Technicolor Dreamcoat in June on the UK National Tour. The following year he played Prince Charming in the panto Snow White and the Seven Dwarves at the Hazlitt Theatre, Maidstone.

=== Television ===
In June 2006, Watkins appeared in a special week of episodes of the BBC Radio Drama Silver Street on the BBC Asian Network. He played the character of former soldier Dave in episodes set in the Welsh countryside. In November 2006, Watkins featured on the BBC Children in Need Celebrity Scissorhands show, where Michelle cut his hair. Watkins was the ninth housemate to enter the Celebrity Big Brother house on 3 January 2007. He finished in fourth place. In April 2007, Watkins starred as the hidden celebrity in an episode of the CBBC series Hider in the House. On 11 March 2008, Watkins presented a documentary about growing up gay in Wales, shown on BBC Wales. While filming for this, Watkins interviewed Christian Voice leader Stephen Green. During the interview, Green compared him to Jeffrey Dahmer.

In December 2008, Watkins was a contestant in Bargain Hunt Famous Finds and partnered with Connie Fisher. Watkins appeared on Skins, episode 2 of series 4. He also appeared in the Living TV series Party Wars in 2010. In February 2013, along with three other celebrities, Watkins was a contestant in the celebrity special of the ITV quiz show The Chase. In 2014, he appeared as one of the celebrities challenged to learn Welsh in a week on the S4C series Cariad@Iaith.

In 2019, he played a fictional version of himself in the comedy murder mystery Dial M for Middlesbrough.

In 2020, Watkins competed in the twelfth series of the ITV series Dancing on Ice. He was the first celebrity in the history of the series to compete within a same sex couple, with professional partner Matt Evers.

In 2024, comedian and television presenter Joe Lycett created a fake news story about Watkins being due to be honoured with an 8-foot statue in Cowbridge, as part of his Channel 4 variety show Late Night Lycett.

=== Steps reunion ===
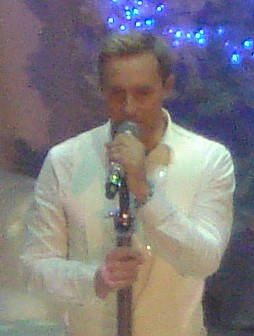
Watkins performing in 2012

In 2009, Lee Latchford-Evans hinted that a future reunion was possible, but that "it isn't the right time right now". In 2011, it was announced that Steps would be reuniting for a four-part Sky Living documentary, depicting their split and the intermittent years. The band would also release their Ultimate Collection, as well as potential new material.

In an interview with Digital Spy on 20 September 2011, Steps said that they believed there might still be a gap in the market for their brand of "happy pop". Lisa Scott-Lee said: "Times have changed, but we are in a recession and Steps' music was very light-hearted and fun, so there could be a place for that in today's society ... What else is interesting is that there aren't any boy/girl pop groups out there at the moment".

== Local politics ==
In May 2023, Watkins was elected as an Independent town councillor in Cowbridge with Llanblethian Town Council.

== Personal life ==
Watkins was born in Llwynypia, (Note: Now in Rhondda Cynon Taf) Mid Glamorgan, Wales, on 8 May 1976. From 1994 to 1995 he attended Pontypridd College and took a foundation course in Fine Art & Design.

On 3 January 2007, Watkins came out as gay in an interview with The Sun newspaper. His interview was published on the day he entered the Celebrity Big Brother house. During his tenure with Steps, Watkins was involved in a relationship with the group's manager, Tim Byrne. Watkins was in a relationship with Craig Ryder from 2007 until November 2017. In 2016, they became fathers to twin sons, born via a surrogate. As of November 2020, Watkins has been in a relationship with dancer-turned-tour-manager Tom Hope. The couple reportedly split briefly after three months but later confirmed they were back together by sharing a photograph of themselves kissing at Cowbridge Pride. Watkins was named on the Wales Online 2017 Pinc List of leading Welsh LGBT figures. In December 2024 Watkins and Hope were featured on BBC's Celebrity Escape to the Country. In June 2025, Watkins and Hope attended the British LGBT Awards together at The Brewery in London, where Watkins received the Special Recognition Award for his contributions to the LGBTQ+ community.

Watkins lives near Cowbridge with his partner Tom Hope, and has two sons. Watkins and Hope co-founded Cowbridge Pride in 2022, have staged an annual pantomime in the town since 2023, and established the music festival now known as Moo-La-La.

=== Misidentification ===
In November 2013, it was reported that Watkins had been receiving hate mail through Twitter from people confusing him with Lostprophets' singer of the same name and nationality, Ian Watkins, who had recently pleaded guilty to sex offences involving children. H received a public apology in court from E! Entertainment Television for having used his photo to illustrate a story about the Lostprophets singer. After the misidentification, H was said to be pursuing legal action after his image appeared next to stories about the other Ian Watkins's crimes through searches on Google News. The incident was parodied by comedic musical act Kunt and the Gang in their song "The Wrong Ian Watkins" in 2015.
