= Tarina Patel =

South African actress, film producer and model

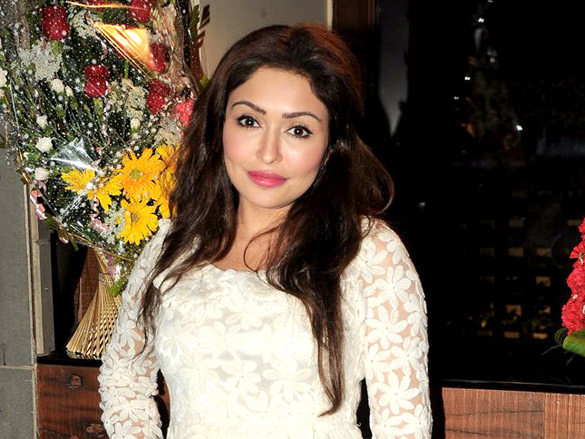
- Born: Cape Town, South Africa
- Education: Durban Girls' College; University of the Free State
- Occupations: Actress, model, film producer
- Years active: 2006 – present
- Notable work: Bhool Bhulaiyaa
- Spouse: Iqbal Sharma (m. 2009)

Tarina Patel is a South African actress, film producer, model and television host, born in Cape Town and raised in Durban. She appeared in Akshay Kumar's horror-comedy Bhool Bhulaiyaa. She has been on the reality television series The Real Housewives of Johannesburg, developed as a South African version of the American franchise The Real Housewives.

== Early life and education ==
Patel was born in Cape Town, South Africa and raised in Durban, KwaZulu-Natal province. She is the only daughter of Raman Patel, a doctor specializing in family and emergency medicine, and Veena Patel, a teacher of English and History. She has two brothers: Hitesh Patel, a business law and tax expert, and Dinesh Patel, who studied actuarial science and business science and founded his own business called Order-In. Patel is an ancestral Gujarati and was raised in the Hindu faith.

Patel was educated at Durban Girls' College where her studies included English, Afrikaans, French, Latin, Biology, Science, mathematics, advanced mathematics and computer science. After completing high school, she moved to Mumbai to study medicine at Jai Hand College and then at Grant Medical College, where her father had studied medicine.

Returning to South Africa, Tarina converted her medical credits and joined the honors program in psychology at the University of the Free State in Bloemfontein. She graduated summa cum laude with a degree in Clinical Psychology. However, she has never formally practiced as a psychologist.

== Career ==
=== Acting and film ===
Patel returned to India after competing her degree in psychology and learned Hindi - a prerequisite for an actor in the Bollywood film industry. She made her film debut in 2006 with the film One Night With The King alongside Omar Sharif and Peter O'Toole. She followed with the Bollywood film Just Married, released on 16 March 2007 opposite Fardeen Khan and Esha Deol. She had a special appearance in Dhol, followed by a small role in the movie Bhagam Bhag. Her next movie, Bhool Bhulaiyaa in 2007, saw her playing the supporting role of Nandini Upadhyay, opposite Akshay Kumar, Vidya Balan and Vineeth.

Patel then went on to play the seductress opposite Dino Morea in Sex on the Beach, directed by Apoorva Lakhia, one of the films that made up the anthology feature Dus Kahaniyaan.

Other titles in Bollywood cinema, of hers, would include Karzzzz, Khallbali: Fun unlimited, Chase (2010 film), and Kamaal Dhamaal Malamaal where she played main and supporting characters with the likes of Urmila Matondkar, Himesh Reshammiya, Shruti Seth, Tiku Talsania, Udita Goswami, Samir Kochhar, Nana Patekar, Paresh Rawal Om Puri and Asrani amongst others.

In 2015, Patel joined the cast of the South African soap Generations: The Legacy. She went on to also play various supporting and guest roles in many other South African television and online shows such as The Wild (TV series), Kings of Jo'Burg, Rockville (TV series), African Dreams, Ayeye (Season 2) and Blood Legacy (TV series). She also presented on the South African flagship magazine programs, Top Billing, Afternoon Express, and Eastern Mosaic.

Most recently, Patel has been on the South African version of The Real Housewives of Johannesburg season 2.

=== Producer ===
In 2015, Patel opened her own production company titled Tarina P Productions, which has created several music videos and commercials. Patel focused on engaging Ethiopia in the production of the film. Mandela's Gun was supported by the South African Department of Arts and Culture and the Department of Trade, Industry, and Competition. The film screened at the Cannes Film Festival. In 2022, she served as associate producer on the South African socio-political thriller Collision, which premiered on Netflix on 16 June 2022 in 97 countries and was in the Top 10 for close on two months.

== Other work ==
=== Humanitarian work ===
When Patel's father fell ill with the auto-immune lung disease idiopathic pulmonary fibrosis (IPF), she cared for him and accompanied him to India where they spent 18 months seeking out the best medical care for his condition.

When her father was pushed to the bottom of the list of transplant recipients, because he was a foreigner, Patel petitioned to change the law regarding organ transplants, so that patients of the Indiaspora, in dire need of an organ would be evaluated, not in terms of their nationality, but rather in terms of the seriousness of their condition.

While in India, Patel also worked alongside local organization's in Chennai to highlight organ donation. There is no tradition of organ donation in northern India and Patel led the drive to inform and encourage donation in that part of the country. As her initiative continued to gain momentum, the state of Chennai recognized her efforts.

To honour her father and his legacy, Patel founded the Dr Ramanbhai Patel Foundation which considers health care to be a basic human right and focuses on health care in Africa and India.

The foundation's first program was to take skilled doctors from India to Africa where they would offer their time and expertise to assist local populations with primary health care. This initiative was successful and eventually spread to Ghana, Tanzania, Rwanda, and Nigeria.

Patel is the founder of the Gandhi-Mandela Peace Initiative which was launched in July 2019. The initiative aims at reviving the message of inclusive and sustainable living inspired by Mahatma Gandhi and Nelson Mandela. With her initiative, she has helped sponsor motivational events which have been attended by the likes of the Dalai Lama

=== Non-Fungible Tokens (NFT) ===
In March 2022, Patel became the first South African actress to enter the non-fungible tokens industry when a sculpture of herself was made and put to auction.

== Awards and recognition ==
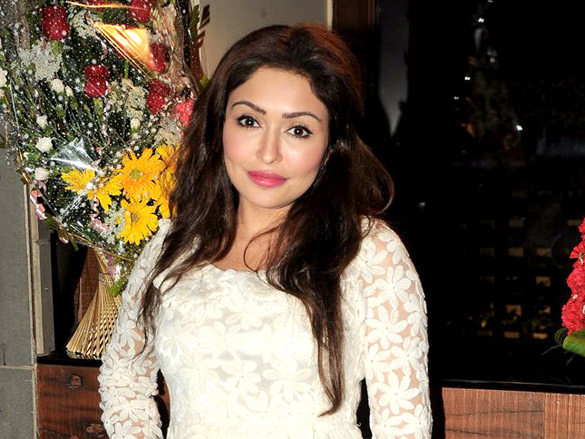

In 2022, during a ceremony held at the Members’ Room, UK Parliament, The Global Gandhi Awards honoured Tarina Patel in recognition of her charitable and humanitarian services. The Global Gandhi Awards promote the lessons of truth, nonviolence, peace, and equality while honouring Mahatma Gandhi's beliefs, teachings, and principles.

The Gujrati Pravasi Award was presented to Patel in 2022 by Amit Shah and the chief minister of Gujrat for her contribution to the arts.

== Filmography ==
=== Film ===
- Hotel Rwanda (2004)
- One Night with the King (2006) as princess Tamina
- Bhagam Bhag (2006) Guest Appearance
- Just Married as Sarah
- Dhol (2007) as Kannika
- Bhool Bhulaiyaa (2007) as Nandini Upadhyay
- Dus Kahaniyaan (2007)
- Khallbali: Fun Unlimited (2008)
- Karzzzz (2008) as Julie
- Chase as Surbhee Patel
- Kamaal Dhamaal Malamaal (2012) as Lily
- Trap City (2024)

=== Television ===
- The Res (2004) as Keshini
- Idols South Africa (2011)
- The Wild (TV series) (2011) as Jiah
- Eastern Mosaic
- Top Billing (2009–2013)
- Afternoon Express (2015)
- MTV VJ
- Charlie's Angels
- Egoli: Place of Gold
- Generations: The Legacy (2015) as Karishma Sharma
- Kings of Jo'Burg as Ms Salem (2020)
- The Real Housewives of Johannesburg (2018–2020)
- Rockville (2021) as Sexy Cougar
- African Dreams (2021) as Priyanka
- Ayeye (Season 2) as Bitchy Mom (2022)
- Blood Legacy (2024) as Meera Rapmersadh

=== Producer ===
- Mandela's Gun (Executive Producer)
- Collision (Associate Producer)
