= Sambar Salsa =

- Directed by: Aditya Raj Kapoor
- Produced by: Renu Patel; Ashish Redij
- Starring: Rishi Kapoor; Preyanka; Roberta Caocci; Ateesh Randev
- Cinematography: Damodar Naidu
- Edited by: Vidhyadhar Pathare
- Music by: Taz; Thara
- Production company: Kaybe Pictures
- Release date: 21 September 2007
- Running time: 99 minutes
- Country: United Kingdom
- Language: English

Sambar Salsa is a 2007 British film directed by Aditya Raj Kapoor starring Rishi Kapoor, Preyanka, Roberta Caocci, and Ateesh Randev in the lead roles.

== Synopsis ==
An Indian man, Surya, and a Spanish woman, Sasha, fall in love much to the disapproval of Surya's parents (Om and Alamelu) even though they had also acted in defiance of their elders.

== Cast ==
- Rishi Kapoor as Om Suri
- Preyanka as Alamelu
- Roberta Caocci as Sasha
- Ateesh Randev as Surya
- Rashami Desai
- Alessia Bonnaci
- Colin Duval
- Paulette Michelle
- Guy Morris
- Thara Prashad
- Ateesh Randev
- Damian Regan

The music director, Taz, makes a cameo appearance as himself.

== Production ==
This film marks the debut of Ateesh Randev, who grew up in London and moved to Mumbai to pursue acting.

== Release ==
Although this film was shot before Don't Stop Dreaming (2007; also directed by Aditya Raj Kapoor, starring Rishi Kapoor with music by Taz), it was released after that film.

=== Critical reception ===
Anil Sinanan, the Bollywood critic of The Sunday Times, wrote that "It is a worthy project with plenty of potential to examine current British Asian family ties, cultural differences, and the difficulties often face in gaining acceptance to communal and inter-racial love".
