= Rajupur =

- Village
- Location in Uttar Pradesh, India Rajupur (India)
- Coordinates: 29°37′N 77°39′E
- Country: India
- State: Uttar Pradesh
- District: Saharanpur

Government
  - Body: Gram panchayat
- Elevation: 12,000 m (39,000 ft)

Population
  - Total: 20,000

Languages
  - Official: Hindi English Urdu
- Time zone: UTC+5:30 (IST)
- PIN: 247554 - 249406
- Vehicle registration: UP
- Nearest city: Deoband Purkazi
- Literacy: 80%
- Vidhan Sabha constituency: Rajupur
- Website: up.gov.in

Rajupur is a village in Saharanpur district of Uttar Pradesh, located 13 kilometers from Deoband. Nearby villages of Rajupur Nizampur Rampur, Unchagaon, Zahirpur, Rajupur Dudhali Fulasi Shakarpur Mafi Tigri.
