= Batla House =

2019 Indian film by Nikkhil Advani

- Theatrical release poster
- Directed by: Nikkhil Advani
- Written by: Ritesh Shah
- Based on: Batla House encounter case
- Produced by: Bhushan Kumar; Divya Khosla Kumar; Krishan Kumar; Monisha Advani; Madhu Bhojwani; John Abraham; Sandeep Leyzell
- Starring: John Abraham; Mrunal Thakur; Ravi Kishan
- Cinematography: Soumik Mukherjee
- Edited by: Maahir Zaveri
- Music by: Score: John Stewart Eduri; Songs: Rochak Kohli; Tanishk Bagchi; Ankit Tiwari; Taz
- Production companies: T-Series; Emmay Entertainment; JA Entertainment; Bake My Cake Films
- Distributed by: Anand Pandit Motion Pictures; Panorama Studios; AA Films
- Release date: 15 August 2019
- Running time: 146 minutes
- Country: India
- Language: Hindi
- Budget: ₹56 crore
- Box office: ₹113.38 crore

Batla House is a 2019 Indian Hindi-language action-thriller film written by Ritesh Shah and directed by Nikkhil Advani. Inspired by the Batla House encounter case that took place on 19 September 2008, the film stars John Abraham as ACP Sanjay Kumar, a police officer based on Sanjeev Kumar Yadav, who played an important role in the encounter, leading to the demise of his colleague Mohan Chand Sharma. Mrunal Thakur and Ravi Kishan appear in supporting roles. The plot showcases the encounter, its aftermath, Sanjay's struggle to catch the fugitives and prove the authenticity of the encounter, while dealing with nationwide hatred and post-traumatic stress disorder.

The film was theatrically released on 15 August 2019, coinciding with the Independence Day (India). It was a commercial success, grossing ₹113.38 crore (US$12 million) worldwide.

== Plot ==
Assistant commissioner of police Sanjay Kumar is informed that his team has cornered 5 university students in L-18, Batla House, who might have been involved in the 13 September 2008 Delhi bombings, the responsibility for which was claimed by the terrorist organization "Indian Mujahideen" (IM). Sanjay orders not to engage until he arrives, but a relentless Inspector Krishan Kumar "K.K." Singh, proceeds with some officers. Sanjay arrives and, upon hearing the gunshots, decides to engage. The building is cleared, and K.K. is found shot down. Sanjay enters the room, and there's more shooting, as a result of which two students, Adil Ameen & Sadiq Khan, end up dead, and Tufail Khan is arrested alive. Dilshad Ahmed and Javed Ali escape and Sanjay now starts facing the heat from media and Politician, who start billing the encounter as a fake one. They're joined by the whole nation in condemning the Delhi Police, and everyone starts demanding justice for the students who were supposedly killed to account for the bombings. Sanjay's wife, Nandita, a News presenter, is however unwilling to accept this and decides to stay with Sanjay, who soon becomes diagnosed with post-traumatic stress disorder, frequently hallucinating about getting shot by the terrorists. She somehow stops him whenever he becomes suicidal.

Sanjay now starts looking for the missing Dilshad and Javed and finds one of them to be hiding in Nizampur Gobari, Uttar Pradesh. He is informed by the police commissioner that he would be awarded for the encounter and that he must celebrate. Realizing he's not been told where to celebrate, he heads to Nizampur, where he manages to find Dilshad. Everyone tries to stop Sanjay, who chases, beats up, and almost arrests Dilshad, only for him to be cornered by the politicians and the public who let him escape but without Dilshad.

After being awarded the President Medal, Sanjay begins his hunt again and this time, through Dilshad's girlfriend Victoria alias "Huma", tricks him into coming to Nepal. He teams up with his officers once again and sends a van to pick up Dilshad, as a part of his plan. The latter, however, sends someone else to check for anything suspicious. Sanjay runs to stop his officers from engaging upon realizing Dilshad's not in the van and lets it flee. Learning of nothing suspicious, Dilshad informs the van driver he'd depart the next day, and upon landing in Nepal, is stopped, thrashed, and arrested by Sanjay and his team.

The court proceedings begin, where the opposing lawyer, Shailesh Arya, brings up arguments to counter Sanjay's truth and a parallel story of fake encounters, as per which K.K. and his men brought the students in L-18 tortured, and decided to kill them when they were ordered not to do so, following which K.K. was shot by one of his officers. Sanjay, however, brings out the truth that actually, his officers had been closely watching the students and realized they belonged to the IM. The real shootout then plays out, showcasing K.K. and his team engaging during the students' fire, and the very fact that K.K. died lends Sanjay's argument strong support when he tells everyone that no officer has ever died in a fake encounter. His arguments convince the court to sentence the 2 terrorists to Life imprisonment, while the last one somehow escapes the country.

While sections of the media still oppose the ruling and believe the police to be culprits, a video clip that surfaced in 2016 featured a confession from the terrorist Javed who had escaped the encounter, about how he managed to do so and later join the ISIS, further confirming the credibility of the encounter.

== Cast ==
- John Abraham as ACP Sanjay Kumar IPS, Nandita's husband (Based on Sanjeev Kumar Yadav)
- Mrunal Thakur as Nandita Kumar, Sanjay's wife and a journalist (Based on Shobha Kumar)
- Ravi Kishan as Inspector K. K. Verma, Sanjay's colleague (Based on Mohan Chand Sharma)
- Manish Chaudhari as Joint CP Jaivir Singh, Delhi Special Cell
- Rajesh Sharma as Advocate Shailesh Arya, Sanjay's defense lawyer
- Anil Rastogi as Home Minister Shivaji Patil (based on Shivraj Patil)
- Nora Fatehi as Huma / Victoria
- Sonam Arora as Shweta Verma
- Sahidur Rahman as Dilshad Ahmed
- Kranti Prakash Jha as Adil Ameen
- Alok Pandey as Tufail Khan
- Faizan Khan as Javed Ali
- Niranjan Jadhoo as Sadiq Khan
- Chirag Katrecha as Zia
- Amit Jairath as Jeetender
- Utkarsh Rai as High Court Judge
- Javed Furquan as Reporter
- Pramod Pathak as Defense Counsel P. Krishnan
- Siddharth Bhardwaj as Maan Singh
- Robin Das as Chacha
- Gaurav Sharma as Nikhil
- Bachchan Pachera as Tufail's father
- Amruta Sant as Shraddha, the activist
- Anjuman Saxena as Nandita's mother
- Jitendra Trehan as Police Commissioner
- Indraneel Bhattacharya as Head of News Channel
- Monisha Advani as Psychiatrist
- Sanjeev Jogtiyani as Constable Balbir Singh
- Amit Jaiswal as Inspector Jaiswal

== Production ==
=== Development ===
In May 2018, Nikkhil Advani announced that he would making a film starring John Abraham in the lead, based on 2008 Operation Batla House.

=== Filming ===
Principal photography began in November 2018, and took place in Delhi, Mumbai, Jaipur, and Nepal. Ravi Kishan and Nora Fatehi joined the cast in November 2018. Filming wrapped in February 2019.

== Release ==
=== Theatrical ===
The film was released on 15 August 2019, coinciding with Independence Day (India).

=== Home media ===
Batla House began streaming on Amazon Prime Video from October 2019.

== Soundtrack ==
Batla House

Soundtrack album by Rochak Kohli, Tanishk Bagchi, Ankit Tiwari and Taz
- Recorded: 2018–2020
- Genre: Feature film soundtrack
- Length: 15:55
- Language: Hindi
- Label: T-Series

The soundtrack is composed by Rochak Kohli, Tanishk Bagchi, Taz and Ankit Tiwari, with the lyrics written by Bagchi, Gautam Sharma, Gurpreet Saini, and Prince Dubey. The first song, "O Saki Saki," is a version of the song "of the same name" from the 2004 film Musafir. The song "O Saki Saki" was launched on 15 July 2019.

One of the songs, "Gallan Goriyan", was removed from the film's final cut and was instead released as a separate single due to thematic inconsistency at the time of the film's release. The song, a recreated version of an eponymous original from the 2000 album Oh Laila, was released on 11 June 2020 by T-Series.

Track listing
No.	Title	Lyrics	Music	Singer(s)	Length
1.	"O Saki Saki"	Tanishk Bagchi (Original Lyrics: Dev Kohli)	Tanishk Bagchi (Original Music: Vishal–Shekhar)	Neha Kakkar, Tulsi Kumar, B Praak	3:11
2.	"Rula Diya"	Prince Dubey	Ankit Tiwari	Ankit Tiwari, Dhvani Bhanushali	4:39
3.	"Jaako Rakhe"	Gautam G Sharma, Gurpreet Saini	Rochak Kohli	Rochak Kohli, Navraj Hans	4:07
4.	"Gallan Goriyan"	Kumaar	Taz	Dhvani Bhanushali, Taz	3:58
Total length:					15:55

== Reception ==
=== Critical response ===
The film received mixed reviews from critics. Bollywood Hungama gave the film 4.5 stars out of 5 and called it "one of the finest films of the year" while praising the performances of John Abraham and Ravi Kishan, the action sequences and the screenplay. The Times of India gave 3.5 stars out of 5 and felt that Abraham delivered "the best of his career" performance, while also praising the action sequences but criticizing the pacing of the second half. Prasanna D Zore writing for Rediff.com gave 2 stars out of 5 and noted that only second half had gripping moments.

=== Box office ===
Batla House earned ₹14 crore domestically on its opening day.

As of 5 September 2019, with a gross of ₹102.61 crore in India and ₹10.77 crore overseas, the film grossed ₹113.38 crore worldwide.
