= Tarsame Singh Saini =

British singer (1967–2022)

- Also known as: Johnny Zee; Taz Stereo Nation
- Born: 23 May 1967; Coventry, West Midlands, England
- Died: 29 April 2022 (aged 54)
- Genres: Asian fusion music
- Occupations: Singer, composer, actor
- Years active: 1989–2022
- Formerly of: Stereo Nation
- Website: stereonation.net

Tarsame Singh Saini (23 May 1967 – 29 April 2022), also known as Taz Stereo Nation and previously Johnny Zee, was a British singer, composer and actor of Indian descent. He was the lead singer of the pop band Stereo Nation which was formed in 1996. He was credited with being the pioneer of cross-cultural Asian fusion music.

Tarsame Singh Saini died on 29 April 2022, at the age of 54.

== Career ==
He first hit the charts in 1989 with the album "Hit the Deck" which spent over 36 weeks on the UK Asian pop chart at number one. The album was produced by Tom Lowry. He went on to produce many albums in the 1990s and early 2000s all of which were successful. To date, all but two of his albums have received gold platinum and multi-platinum discs. His most successful album was Slave II Fusion, released in 2000, which includes many of his most well-known hit songs including "Pyar Ho Gaya", "Nachenge Saari Raat", and "Gallan Gorian". His music videos also feature actors before they became famous. His video "Pyar Ho Gaya" featured Shiney Ahuja and "Ishq Ho Gaya" features model and actress Koena Mitra.

Stereo Nation's "Don't Break My Heart" (1994) inspired the song "O Baby Dont Break My Heart" in the film Mohabbat (1997), the soundtrack album of which sold 2 million units in India.

He also contributed songs to the soundtracks of Bollywood films such as Tum Bin (2001), Koi Mil Gaya (2003) and Race (2008).

In 2005, he won "Best International Artist" at the UK Asian Music Awards.

In 2007, he made his film debut with the British film Don't Stop Dreaming, for which he also composed the soundtrack and did the playback singing. In the film, he co-starred with actors including Rishi Kapoor, Sunil Shetty & Richard Blackwood.

In 2008 he returned with his new album Jawani on the Rocks. His hit singles from this album include "Meri Nazron Mein Tu Hain" and "Hai Hai Jawani". In 2010, he released his album, Twist & Shout, which was a success. The 2020 single release, "Galan Goriyan", with Dhvani Bhanushali, which is a remake of the 2000 hit song, has amassed over 10 million views on YouTube.

== Discography ==
=== Albums ===
- Hit the Deck (1989)
- The Remix Album (1990)
- Vibes (1991)
- Back to My Roots (1992)
- From me to You (1993)
- Spirits of Rhythm (1994)
- New Dawn (1995)
- I've Been Waiting (1996)
- Jambo (1998)
- Nasha (1999)
- Slave II Fusion [Oh Laila] (2000)
- Tazmania (2002)
- Cafe Mumbai [Apna Sangeet] (2003/2004)
- Jawani on the Rocks (2008)
- Rewind Selekta (2009)
- Twist & Shout (2010)
- Desi & U know it (2012)
- Beautiful [single] (2021)

=== Film soundtracks ===
Taz has also contributed to the soundtracks for the following films:

- Tum Bin (2001, song: Daroo Vich Pyar)
- Koi... Mil Gaya (2003, song: It's Magic)
- Race (2008, song: Mujhpe To Jadoo)
- It's a Wonderful Afterlife (2010)
- Diary of a Butterfly (2012)
- Mr. Bhatti on Chutti (2012)
- Guest iin London (2017)
- Batla House (2019)

== Filmography ==
- Tum Bin (2001) .... Himself (Performer of song "Daru Vich Pyaar Mila De")
- Don't Stop Dreaming (2007) .... Channi Singh
- Sambar Salsa (2007) .... Himself
