= Aditya Raj Kapoor =

Indian actor and filmmaker

- Born: 1 July 1956 (age 70); Bombay, Bombay State, India
- Occupations: Actor; director; producer; screenwriter; businessman; author
- Years active: 1973-present
- Spouse: Priti Kapoor (m. 1982)
- Children: 2
- Parents: Shammi Kapoor (father); Geeta Bali (mother)
- Family: Kapoor

Aditya Raj Kapoor (born 1 July 1956) is an Indian actor, filmmaker, author and retired businessman. Born into the Kapoor family, he is the son of actors Shammi Kapoor and Geeta Bali.

== Early life ==
Kapoor was born on 1 July 1956 in Bombay, the capital city of the Indian state of Maharashtra.

He is the grandson of actor Prithviraj Kapoor, nephew of actors Raj Kapoor and Shashi Kapoor, cousin of actors Rishi Kapoor, Kunal Kapoor, Karan Kapoor, Randhir Kapoor, Sanjana Kapoor and Rajiv Kapoor. He is uncle to actors Karishma Kapoor, Kareena Kapoor and Ranbir Kapoor.

He attended The Lawrence School, Sanawar from 1963-1969, he later dropped out from the school. In 2023, he completed his Bachelor of Arts degree at the age of 67 from Indira Gandhi National Open University in Philosophy via correspondence.

== Career ==
=== 1973-2003: Assisting, producing films and business ventures ===
After finishing his school education, Kapoor started his film career as an assistant director to his uncle Raj Kapoor for his romantic film Bobby (1973) and then went on to work as assistant director in Dharam Karam (1975), Satyam Shivam Sundaram (1978), Geraftaar (1985), Ajooba (1990).

He also did a walk-on part in Satyam Shivam Sundaram (1978).

He turned producer with the 1989 film Gawaahi, which had Zeenat Aman, Tanuja and Shekhar Kapur in key roles. He then ventured into producing television shows; Ek Do Teen Char (1987-1988) and Mama Ji (1992-1993).

After refusing to act in films, he turned businessman. His construction company developed the amusements parks Fantasy Land in Mumbai and Appu Ghar in Delhi. He also owns a truck and warehouse business.

=== 2004-2009: Directorial ventures ===
After a hiatus from Bollywood, Kapoor made a comeback as writer and director of Don't Stop Dreaming and Sambar Salsa (both 2007).

=== 2010-present: Expansion into acting ===
Kapoor's first important role as an actor came with Jagmohan Mundhra's Chase (2010). Following Chase he played the role of a businessman who falls in love with a prostitute in Mumbai 118. Kapoor also starred in Diwangi Ne Had Kar Di (2010), Isi Life Mein (2010), Say Yes to Love (2012) and Yamla Pagla Deewana 2 (2011). In 2014, he participated in the bike-ride India Hai, that covered several Indian states and neighbouring countries of Nepal and Bhutan. In the same year, Kapoor appeared in the Ashutosh Gowariker-directed television series Everest.

== Personal life ==
In 1982, Kapoor married Priti Kapoor. The couple have two children together, daughter Tulsi and son Vishwapratap. Aditya's daughter Tulsi Kapoor tried her skills in singing, and Aditya's son, Vishwapratap Kapoor - a software engineer, lives in America.

Aditya currently resides in Goa.

=== Biking ===
Kapoor turned biker at a late age and started travelling on his bike. In 2014, he participated in the bike-ride contest India Hai that covered several Indian states and also Nepal and Bhutan.

He wrote his first book Bike on a Hike in 2015, in which he describes his biking experiences.

In 2018, he travelled through over a dozen countries over 302 days as part of his world tour on his bike Triumph Bonneville T100. He has clocked 35,000 km around the world, starting off in June 2017 from Prithvi Theatre, Mumbai. His step-mother, Neela Kapoor, cousins Randhir Kapoor, Kunal Kapoor and friend Jackie Shroff were present with his wife Priti Kapoor at the start of his journey.

He also wrote a book titled Quest, which documented his travelling experience of these 35,000 km on bike. It was launched in Majorda, Goa in 2021.

== Filmography ==
=== Films ===
Year	Title	Role	Notes
1978	Satyam Shivam Sundaram	Unknown	Uncredited
1989	Gawaahi	—N/a	Producer only
2004	Shamaal: The Sandstorm	—N/a	Unreleased; director and screenwriter only
2007	Don't Stop Dreaming	—N/a	Director and screenwriter only
2007	Sambar Salsa	—N/a	Director and screenwriter only
2010	Chase	Anil Khanna	
2010	Diwangi Ne Had Kar Di		
2010	Mumbai 118		
2010	Isi Life Mein	Prashant	
2011	Dil Toh Baccha Hai Ji	Harsh Narang	
2012	Say Yes to Love		
2013	Yamla Pagla Deewana 2		
2016	Waarrior Savitri	Thakur	
2016	Mareyadiru Endendu		Kannada film

Assistant director

- Bobby (1973)
- Dharam Karam (1975)
- Satyam Shivam Sundaram (1978)
- Geraftaar (1985)
- Ajooba (1990)

=== Television ===
Year	Title	Role	Notes
1987-1988	Ek Do Teen Char	—N/a	Producer only
1992-1993	Mama Ji	—N/a	Producer only
2014-2015	Everest	Nasir Siddiqui	

== Bibliography ==
- Bike On A Hike. CreateSpace Independent Publishing Platform. 2015. ISBN 978-1515154785.
- Quest. Cyscoprime Publishers. 2021. ISBN 978-9354462085.
