= Michelle Collins =

British actress (born 1962)

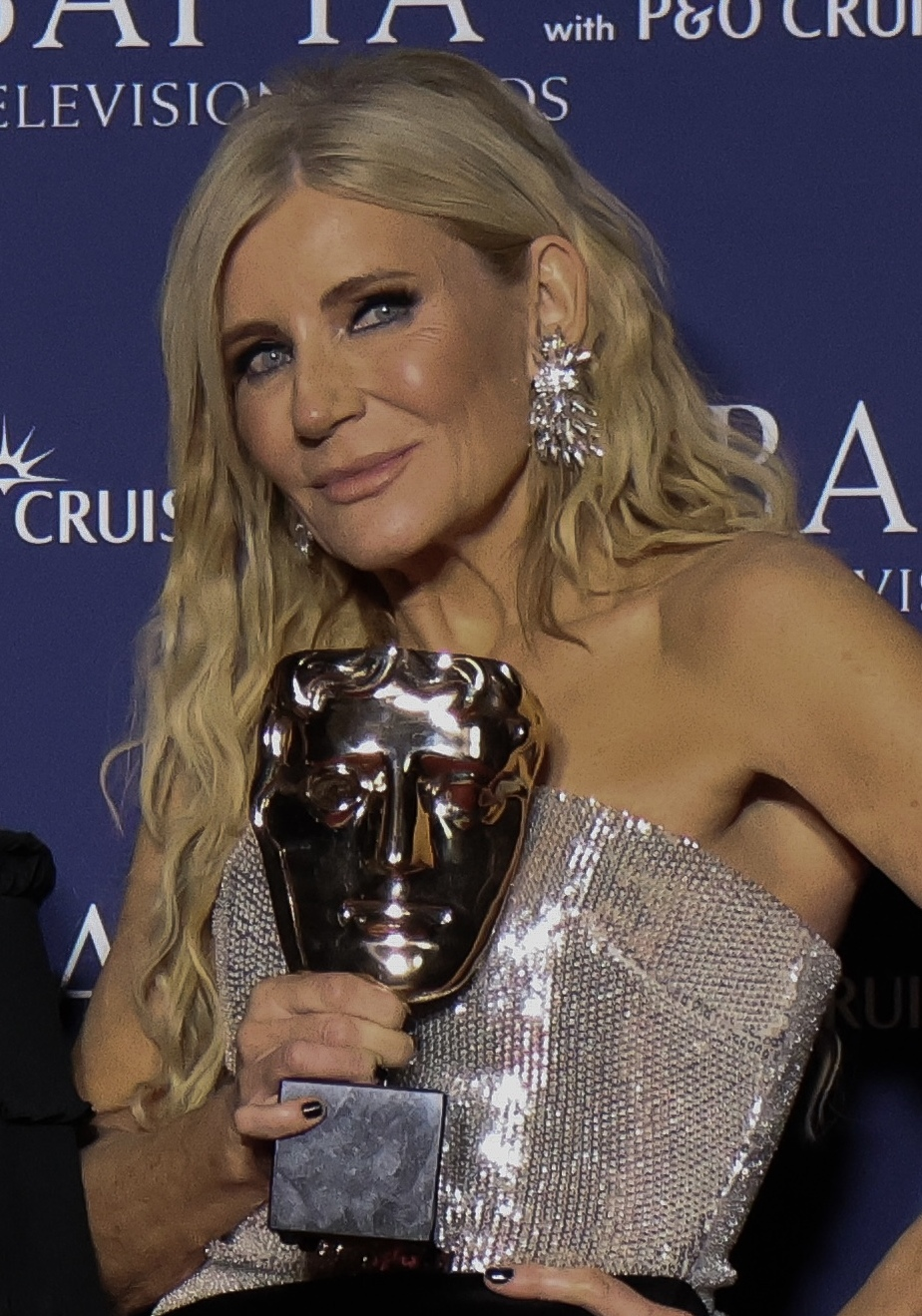
- Collins in 2026
- Born: Michelle Danielle Collins; 28 May 1962 (age 64); Homerton, London, England
- Occupation: Actress
- Years active: 1984–present
- Television: EastEnders; Coronation Street
- Spouse: Mike Davidson (m. 2022)
- Children: 1

Michelle Danielle Collins (born 28 May 1962) is a British actress. She is known for her role as Cindy Beale in the BBC soap opera EastEnders (1988–1990, 1992–1998, 2023–present), as well as appearing as Stella Price in ITV's Coronation Street (2011–2014). Her other notable television roles include the BBC dramas Real Women (1998–1999), Sunburn (1999–2000) and Two Thousand Acres of Sky (2001–2003).

== Early life and education ==
Collins was born on 28 May 1962 at Hackney Hospital, Homerton High Street in Hackney, East London, to a Welsh mother, Mary, and a father of English and Flemish heritage. Her Flemish grandfather was Belgian from Antwerp and had emigrated to the UK in 1915 when aged five. She, alongside her elder sister Vicki, were brought up by their mother in Highbury, London. When Collins was 14, her mother went back to university to obtain a law degree. In the 1970s, Collins was a member of the youth organisation the Woodcraft Folk, and visited Romania with the group.

Collins trained at the Royal Court Activists and Cockpit Youth Theatre from the age of 14, and Kingsway Princeton College, where she studied drama and theatre at O/A-level.

== Career ==
=== Early career ===
After her exams, Collins landed a role in Mikhail Bulgakov's The Crimson Island, directed by Lou Stein, at the Gate Theatre. Her career changed direction after performing in the 1978 video for the Squeeze song "Cool For Cats", and as a backing singer for Mari Wilson and the Wilsations. The band spent 18 months touring the country. When the band broke up in 1982, she went back into acting and with the help of her friend, the British actor Tim Roth, she gained a part in a musical with Gary Hutton and Gary Shail.

Collins's first TV appearance was with Gary Oldman in the BBC drama Morgan's Boy. Other TV credits included: two series of the sitcom Running Wild, where she played Ray Brooks daughter; a part in ITV drama The Bill; a Screen Two production Lucky Sunil, directed by Michael Caton-Jones and a BBC play Pressures. She later appeared in three films: Personal Services, Empire State and Stephen Poliakoff's Hidden City. Collins appeared in an episode of the BBC's Bergerac (series 4) in 1985.

=== EastEnders ===
While she was filming the BBC play Pressures in 1988, Collins was spotted by EastEnders producer Julia Smith, who asked her to audition for the role of Cindy Williams, who was to feature in 11 episodes of the soap. The manipulative, reckless nature of her character was a hit with viewers so her contract was extended and the character became a major villain in the series. Cindy was the unfaithful wife of EastEnders stalwart Ian Beale (Adam Woodyatt), between 1988 and 1998. During breaks from EastEnders she filmed the drama Real Women for the BBC, with Pauline Quirke and Frances Barber. On 14 November 2014, Collins reprised the role of Cindy for a short stint for Children in Need.

In May 2023, it was announced that Collins would be returning to the soap after 25 years, alongside Woodyatt, thus resurrecting the character from the dead. Collins returned to the role permanently in June 2023, where it is revealed that Cindy hadn't died in childbirth, but had entered a witness protection programme and had taken on the identity of 'Rose Knight', the wife of George Knight (Colin Salmon) and the mother of Gina (Francesca Henry) and Anna (Molly Rainford).

=== After EastEnders ===
After leaving EastEnders in 1998, her career saw a series of drama roles. These included: two series of Real Women (BBC One); two series of Sunburn (BBC One), for which Collins sang the theme song (which was a no. 28 hit in the UK singles chart in 1999); Daylight Robbery (ITV); The Sleeper (BBC One); Uprising (ITV): three series of Two Thousand Acres of Sky (BBC One): the two-part series Perfect (ITV); Lloyd and the Hill (ITV) and Ella and the Mothers (BBC One). In 2003, Collins played Sarah Barton in Single.

In 2003, Collins filmed the BBC drama Sea of Souls and then went on to star in a film for Granada/Channel 4 called The Illustrated Mum, which told the story of two girls coping with the unpredictable behaviour of their depressed, alcoholic mother. The film, written by Jacqueline Wilson, was based on the children's novel of the same name. It was screened over Christmas 2003 and won an Emmy Award and two BAFTAs.

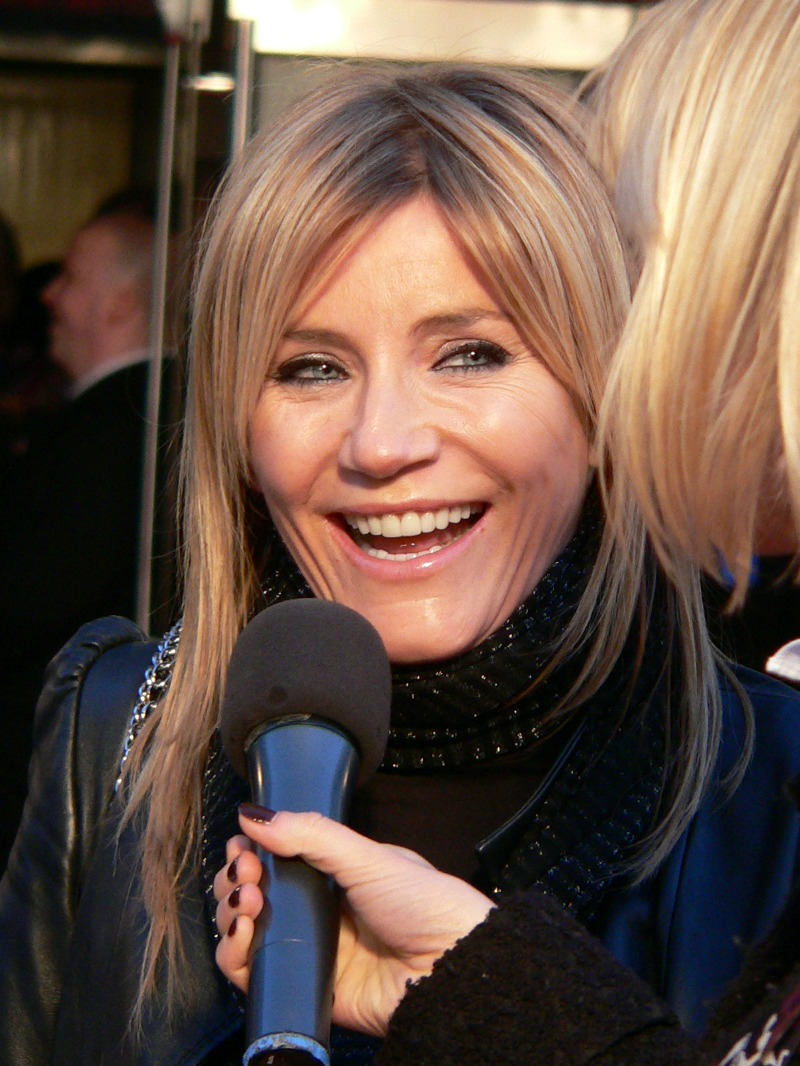
Collins at the premiere of the film Miss Potter in 2006

In 2004, she starred in an episode of French and Saunders and also starred with fellow EastEnders actor Martin Kemp in the ITV drama Can't Buy Me Love. In 2005, Collins starred in the ITV drama The Last Detective and in the BBC drama The Family Man, alongside Daniela Denby-Ashe, which aired in March 2006. She starred in the West End musical Daddy Cool, and while working during the night there shot sequences for a cameo in the short film Broken written and directed by Vicki Psarias, which went on to win the several international awards. She also featured in the film Don't Stop Dreaming, released in 2007. She left Daddy Cool in January 2007 to shoot the Doctor Who episode "42".

On 2 July 2007, it was announced that Collins has been cast for the lead role of Karina Faith in new ITV drama series, Rock Rivals, produced by Shed Productions. In 2009, Collins took part in the BBC Wales programme Coming Home about her Welsh family history. On 21 May 2009, it was rumoured that Collins had auditioned to star in US drama Desperate Housewives, but she did not join the cast.

In June 2010, it was announced that Collins would make a six-episode guest appearance as a patient's mother in Casualty. In 2010, she also guest-starred in Romeo & Juliet at the Octagon Theatre, Bolton, playing the Nurse. From 7 April-7 May 2011, Collins starred as Sheila Grundy, Fred Dibnah's third wife, in The Demolition Man at Octagon Theatre, Bolton.

=== Coronation Street ===
"I am honoured to be joining the cast of Coronation Street. The show has been part of my life since I was a child, so to become a part of it is extremely exciting."

In January 2011, a rumour was posted on Digital Spy that Collins was in talks to join EastEnders' main rivalling soap Coronation Street, after she allegedly met with soap's producer and close friend Phil Collinson. Three months later it was confirmed Collins had joined the cast as Stella Price, new landlady of the Rovers Return pub, beating Lisa Maxwell for the role. Her first episode aired on 16 June 2011 and gained a rating of 8.4 million. It was announced on 22 August 2013 Collins had decided to leave Coronation Street. In January 2014, Collins claimed she was "unhappy" over the lack of screen time for her and her character. Collins filmed her final scenes on 19 February 2014, and made her final appearance as Stella on 2 April 2014.

=== After Coronation Street ===
Since leaving Coronation Street, Collins has had various guest roles in television dramas: Casualty as Samantha Kellman (2014), Death in Paradise as Annette Burgess (2015), and Midsomer Murders as Nadine Campbell (2016). In October 2019 Collins appeared in Casualty as Lorna Rowle/Hammond. In 2016, Collins took part in the ITV reality series Bear Grylls: Mission Survive.

== Personal life ==
Collins has a daughter with ex-partner Fabrizio Tassalini, born in 1996. In 2014, Collins revealed that in 1998 – distraught by the end of her relationship with Tassalini and feeling career pressure – she attempted suicide while filming Sunburn in Cyprus. She took an overdose of sleeping pills but later woke up and asked a co-star to take her to hospital.

After their split, Collins had an amicable relationship with Tassalini, who lived close by, and they raised their daughter together until he died in 2014. In April 2022, Collins announced she was engaged to her partner of 10 years, Mike Davidson. They married in August that year.

In November 1993, Collins appeared with Stephen Fry and Hugh Laurie in a party political broadcast for the Labour Party. In August 2014, she was one of 200 public figures to sign a letter to The Guardian in opposition to Scottish independence in the run-up to September's referendum on that issue.

Collins is involved in charitable causes. She is an ambassador for Oxfam and has visited Brazil, South Africa and Armenia, promoting the need for the basic right to education. She is also an ambassador for Ambitious about Autism and a patron for the Alexandra Wylie Tower Foundation.

== Published works ==
- Michelle Collins (2014). This Is Me. Michael O'Mara. ISBN 978-1782432326.

== Filmography ==
=== Film ===
Year	Title	Role
1987	Personal Services	June
1987	Empire State	Emma
1987	Hidden City	Applicant at Hairdressing Salon
1992	Come by Chance	Young cowgirl
1993	John Virgo: Playing for Laughs	Herself
1993	A Place to Be Loved	Julie
1996	Darkman III: Die Darkman Die	Nurse
1999	Real Women II	Susie Ball
2000	Waking Mele	Bar Patron
2001	Perfect	Julie
2001	Lloyd & Hill	DI Judy Hill
2002	Ella and the Mothers	Gina
2003	It Shouldn't Happen to a TV Actor	Kathy Lawrence
2004	PJ's Storytime	Herself
2004	Bubblegum	Jenny
2004	Can't Buy Me Love	Donna Harris
2006	The Family Man	Gillian
2007	Jackie Magazine: A Girl's Best Friend	Herself
2007	Don't Stop Dreaming	Jessica
2007	Broken	Janet
2008	The Bill Made Me Famous	Herself
2008	Play	Mother
2008	Getting Out	Chelle
2012	Coronation Street: A Christmas Corrie	Stella Price
2013	Shades	Herself
2014	Coronation Street: A Moving Story	Herself
2014	Eastenders: The Ghosts of Ian Beale – Children in Need Special	Cindy Beale
2017	What Does and Idea Sound Like?	
2017	Black Road	Maggie Laine
2018	My Dad's Gap Year	Cath
2018	To Provide All People	Maternity Admin
2019	Coronation Street at Christmas	Stella Price
2019	Celebrity 5 Go Camping	Herself
2019	Madam Mayor	Denise
2020	Coronation Street: Complications	Stella Price
2020	The Winter's Tale – Rehearsed Reading	Hermione
2020	Dealer	Herself
2021	Rise of the Footsoldier: Origins	Mandy Williams
2022	The Long Walk	Suzanne James
2023	My House	Sarah
2023	Stephen	Max
2023	Children in Need	Cindy Beale
2023	Searching for Lily	Queenie
2024	The Cancellation of Jim Davidson	Herself
2024	A Gangster's Kiss	Sadie
2025	Melodrive	Nora

=== Television ===
Year	Title	Role	Note(s)
1984	Scene	Ria	Episode: "Good Neighbours"
1984	Morgan's Boy	Carol	Episode: "Series 1, episode 1"
1985	Marjorie and Men	Debbie	2 episodes
1985	Bergerac	Trace	Episode: "Chrissie"
1986	The Bill	Sharon Brand	Episode: "Loan Shark"
1986	Gems	Pru Murphy	10 episodes
1987	Full House	Abby	Episode: "The First Day of School"
1987, 1989	Running Wild	Stephanie Wild	13 episodes
1988	Family Ties	Louise	Episode: "Sign of the Times"
1988	Screen Two	Daisy	Episode: "Lucky Sunil"
1988–1990, 1992–1998, 2023–present	EastEnders	Cindy Beale	Regular role
1990	Style Trial	Herself	Episode: "Series 1, episode 8"
1990	Juke Box Jury	Herself	Episode: "Series 4, episode 1"
1990–1991	The Word	Herself	4 episodes
1991	Star Test	Herself	Episode: "Michelle Collins"
1991	Cluedo	Herself	Episode: "A Traveller's Tale"
1991	Gone to the Dogs	Herself	Episode: "Series 1, episode 4"
1991	Motormouth	Herself	Episode: "Series 4, episode 18"
1991	Gabriel's Fire	Young Girl	Episode: "Birds Gotta Fly"
1992	TV Squash	Herself	Episode: "Series 1, episode 4"
1992	Telly Addicts	Herself	Episode: "Series 8, episode 17"
1992	Baywatch	Herself	Episode: "Big Monday"
1993	The Main Event	Herself	Episode: "Series 1, episode 4"
1993	The Music Game	Herself	Episode: "Series 2, episode 3"
1993	The Talking Show	Herself	Episode: "Body Language and Final Touches"
1993	Blossom	Jennie	2 episodes
1993, 1995–1996	That's Showbusiness	Herself	4 episodes
1995	What's Up Doc?	Herself	Episode: "Series 3, episode 32"
1995	Steve Wright's People Show	Herself	Episode: "Series 2, episode 3"
1995	Dear Dilemma	Herself	Episode: "Series 1, episode 5"
1996	Champs	Stacy	Episode: "Home Alone"
1996–1997	You Bet!	Herself	2 episodes
1997, 1999–2000	Live & Kicking	Herself	3 episodes
1998	Blankety Blank	Herself	2 episodes
1998	Holiday Heaven	Herself	Episode: "Series 1, episode 6"
1998	Verdict	Camille Backhouse	Episode: "Neighbours from Hell"
1998–1999	Real Women	Susie Ball	7 episodes
1998–2000	TFI Friday	Herself	3 episodes
1999	Stars in Their Eyes	Herself	Episode: "1999 Celebrity Special"
1999	Stars in Their Eyes	Chrissie Hynde	Episode: "1999 Celebrity Special"
1999–2000	Sunburn	Nicki Matthews	14 episodes
1999–2000	Daylight Robbery	Kathy Lawrence	8 episodes
1999–2000, 2002	This Is Your Life	Herself	3 episodes
2000	The Priory	Herself	Episode: "Series 1, episode 13"
2000	Up Rising	Maxine Gaines	5 episodes
2000	The Sleeper	Diana Wakeham	2 episodes
2001	It's Only TV... But I Like It	Herself	Episode: "Series 3, episode 8"
2001–2003	Two Thousand Acres of Sky	Abby Wallace	22 episodes
2003	The Illustrated Mum	Marigold Westward	Television film
2003	Single	Sarah Barton	6 episodes
2004	Sea of Souls	Katie Quinn	2 episodes
2004	French and Saunders	Regan Lear	Episode: "Series 6, episode 4"
2005	Big Brother's Efourum	Herself	Episode: "Series 2, episode 12"
2005	Totally Scott-Lee	Herself	Episode: "Series 1, episode 2"
2005	The Last Detective	Maureen Fallon	Episode: "Willesden Confidential"
2006	Davina	Herself	Episode: "Series 1, episode 5"
2006	The F Word	Herself	Episode: "Series 2, episode 6"
2007	Comedy Connections	Nicki Matthews	Episode: "Don't Wait Up"
2007	Come Dine with Me	Herself	Episode: "Celebrity Special: All In One"
2007	Doctor Who	Kath McDonnell	Episode: "42"
2007, 2009	EastEnders Revealed	Cindy Beale	2 episodes
2008	All Star Family Fortunes	Herself	Episode: "Christopher Biggins vs Michelle Collins"
2008	Strictly Come Dancing	Herself	2 episodes
2008	Celebrity Ding Dong	Herself	Episode: "Series 2, episode 6"
2008	Rock Rivals	Karina Faith	8 episodes
2008, 2011	Who Wants to Be a Millionaire	Herself	2 episodes
2009	Revealed	Herself	Episode: "Jack the Ripper: Tabloid Killer"
2009	As Seen on TV	Herself	Episode: "Series 1, episode 3"
2009	Hotel Babylon	Karen	Episode: "Series 4, episode 8"
2009, 2014	Ant & Dec's Saturday Night Takeaway	Herself	2 episodes
2010	What Do Kids Know?	Herself	Episode: "Series 1, episode 8"
2010	Undateable	Herself	Episode: "Hour 3"
2010	Celebrity Pressure Cooker	Herself	Episode: "Series 1, episode 2"
2010	Marple	Treadwell	Episode: "The Secret of Chimneys"
2010, 2014, 2019	Casualty	Camille Lewis	4 episodes
2010, 2014, 2019	Casualty	Samantha Kellman	3 episodes
2010, 2014, 2019	Casualty	Lorna Rowle	Episode: "Series 34, episode 8"
2011	Cash in the Celebrity Attic	Herself	Episode: "Michelle Collins"
2011	Celebrity Chase	Herself	Episode: "Series 1, episode 2"
2011	Celebrity Juice	Herself	2 episodes
2011–2014	Coronation Street	Stella Price	Regular role, 447 episodes
2012	Innuendo Bingo	Herself	Episode: "Chris and Rhianna"
2012	12 Again	Herself	Episode: "Series 1, episode 12"
2013	You Saw Them Here First	Herself	Episode: "Series 1, episode 1"
2013	Show Me the Telly	Herself	7 episodes
2013	Catchphrase	Herself	Episode: "Christmas Special: Michael Ball, Michelle Collins and Carol Vorderman"
2015	Countdown	5 episodes	
2015	Death in Paradise	Annette Burgess	Episode: "She Was Murdered Twice"
2015	Doctor Who: The Novel Adaptations	Winnie Tyler	Episode: "Damaged Goods"
2015	SunTrap	Coco	Episode: "Casino"
2016	Bear Grylls: Mission Survive	Herself	5 episodes
2016	Midsomer Murders	Nadine Campbell	Episode: "The Incident at Cooper Hill"
2017	Partners in Rhyme	Herself	Episode: "...At Christmas Time"
2017	Sparebnb	Jill	Episode: "Derek"
2017	The Mayoress	Denise	Episode: "Series 1, episode 1"
2018	The Dumping Ground	Fiona	4 episodes
2019	Queens of Mystery	Electra Bliss	2 episodes
2019, 2021, 2024	Pointless Celebrities	Herself	2 episodes
2020	EastEnders: Secrets from the Square	Cindy Beale	2 episodes
2021	Celebrity Masterchef	Herself	Episode: "Series 16, episode 10"
2021	Richard Osman's House of Games	Herself	5 episodes
2021	The Weakest Link	Herself	Episode: "Series 1, episode 5"
2022	Garraway's Good Stuff	Herself	Episode: "Series 1, episode 10"
2025	The Last Anniversary	Suburban Pamela	2 episodes

== Stage ==
Year	Title	Role	Note(s)
1990–1991	Snow White and the Seven Dwarfs	Snow White	Oxford Apollo
1991–1992	Aladdin	The Princess	Oxford Apollo
1994–1995	Jack and the Beanstalk	Jack	Hackney Empire
1996–1997	Dick Whittington	Alice Fitzwarren	Orchard Theatre, Dartford
2004	Rattle of a Simple Man	Cyreene	Harold Pinter Theatre
2004–2005	The Play What I Wrote	Various	UK Tour
2006–2007	Daddy Cool	Ma Baker	Shaftesbury Theatre
2008–2009	Cinderella	Wicked Stepmother	Bristol Hippodrome
2010	Calendar Girls	Cora	Phoenix Theatre; Various
2011	Romeo and Juliet	Nurse	Octagon Theatre, Bolton
2011	The Demolition Man	Sheila Grundy	Octagon Theatre, Bolton
2014	The Glass Supper	Wendy	Hampstead Theatre, London
2016	Chitty Chitty Bang Bang	Baroness Bombhurst	UK & Ireland Tour
2016–2017	Aladdin	The Genie	Aylesbury Waterside
2017	A Dark Night in Dalston	Gina	Park Theatre, London
2017	Thoroughly Modern Millie	Mrs. Meers	UK Tour
2017–2018	Cinderella	Wicked Stepmother	Orchard Theatre, Dartford
2018–2019	Jack and the Beanstalk	Fairy Nuff	Crewe Lyceum
2019	My Dad’s Gap Year	Cath	Park Theatre, London
2019	How Love is Spelt	Marion	Southwark Playhouse
2019–2020	Sleeping Beauty	Carabosse	Wyvern Theatre, Swindon
2020	The Birthday Party	Meg	UK Tour
2021	Safe Sex	Marion	The Turbine Theatre, London
2021–2022	Sleeping Beauty	Nightshade	Poole Lighthouse Theatre
2022	Cluedo	Miss Scarlett	UK Tour
2025	Motorhome Marilyn	Denise	Edinburgh Fringe Festival

== Awards and nominations ==
Year	Ceremony	Category	Work	Result	Ref.
2013	British Soap Awards	Best Actress	Coronation Street	Longlisted	
2023	I Talk Telly Awards	Best Soap Partnership (with Adam Woodyatt)	EastEnders	Nominated	
2024	National Television Awards	Serial Drama Performance	EastEnders	Longlisted	
2024	National Film Awards UK	Best Actress in a TV Series	EastEnders	Won	
2024	Inside Soap Awards	Best Actress	EastEnders	Longlisted	
2025	Inside Soap Awards	Best Actress	EastEnders	Pending	
