= Udita =

Udita may refer to:

- Udita Goswami (born 1984), Indian actress
- Udita Duhan (born 1998), Indian field hockey player
