= Just Married (2007 film) =

- Film's poster
- Directed by: Meghna Gulzar
- Written by: Gulzar (dialogues)
- Produced by: Pritish Nandy Communications
- Starring: Fardeen Khan; Esha Deol; Satish Shah; Kirron Kher
- Cinematography: Sachin K. Krishn
- Edited by: Hemal Kothari
- Music by: Pritam
- Distributed by: Eros International
- Release date: 16 March 2007
- Running time: 116 minutes
- Country: India
- Language: Hindi

Just Married is a 2007 Indian Hindi-language comedy film directed by Meghna Gulzar, starring Fardeen Khan, Esha Deol in lead roles along with Satish Shah, Kirron Kher and Mukul Dev in supporting roles.

== Plot ==
Abhay Sachdeva and Ritika Khanna are young, modern Indian professionals. They briefly meet at a wedding and individually make their dislike for arranged marriages known, since they do not understand the concept of marrying a stranger. Unbeknownst to them, their parents meet at the same wedding and compare their horoscopes, which begins the process of arranging a match. Even though they each have strong objections, the couple eventually gives in to their parents' wishes and gets married. The newlyweds then embark on a honeymoon trip to Ooty. The trip is part of a romantic getaway package where they will be sharing a lodge with other couples.

The first people they meet are Mr. and Mrs. Chaturvedi, an elderly couple celebrating their anniversary. They constantly bicker and argue, but actually love each other deeply. Abhay and Ritika then meet Shoaib and Anaiya, another newlywed couple. Anaiya is Shoaib's sister's best friend and has always had feelings for him, but Shoaib is unable to think of Anaiya as anything but a childhood friend. Strolling in the forest, the pair meet Rishab and Anu, a couple who are head over heels in love with each other and have come to Ooty on their yearly holiday. They have the perfect romance, and the other couples envy them and their amazing relationship. Later, Ritika tries to prolong dinner to avoid spending time alone with Abhay. That night she cannot bring herself to consummate the marriage, and after Abhay falls asleep, she decides to sleep on the sofa. The next day, the group prepares to go on an outing organised by the lodge management. There they meet A.K. and Sarah, who have arrived late due to delayed trains. A.K. is an explorer who has been out of the country for a long time, and Sarah is his long-term, half-Indian girlfriend. A.K. has proposed many times, but Sarah does not see the need for marriage.

The couples spend the day exploring the lake and surrounding town. Later, at a celebratory dinner organised for Mr. and Mrs. Chaturvedi's fortieth anniversary, the group gets better acquainted by sharing the stories of how each couple met. That night Abhay separates the beds in their room so Ritika does not feel uncomfortable any longer. He explains to her that they need to work on their relationship for it to grow; she is still reluctant, but her attitude begins to soften. The next day the pair spent time alone, visiting tourist attractions and getting to know each other. The romantic, happy mood is broken that night when Abhay tries to be intimate with Ritika and she lashes out at him, causing an argument. Their relationship is strained, but she puts on a show for the other couples, who all believe that they are adjusting to their arranged marriage well. A few days later, a frustrated Abhay expresses his conflicted feelings towards love and marriage, and Mr. Chaturvedi gives the men some advice. Meanwhile, the women give Sarah a traditional Indian makeover as a surprise for A.K. He proposes, and she accepts, and the other couples plan them a celebration.

At the party, Shoaib is finally able to see Anaiya as his wife, and they decide to have dinner alone together. Sarah notices the tension between Abhay and Ritika and advises Ritika to work things out before the issue escalates. The celebrations are cut short when an employee informs Rishab that his wife has called to speak to him, and the group realizes that Anu and Rishab are having an affair. An emotional Anu decides to leave Rishab and the lodge that night. The next day, the group departs from the lodge as the trip comes to an end. The bus has an accident and hangs off the edge of a cliff. Abhay makes a plan to get all the passengers off the bus, but a scared Mr. and Mrs. Chaturvedi refuse to leave. Ritika gets on board again to convince them to get off, and the frightening situation brings her closer to Abhay.

As everyone else waits for alternative transport, Abhay and Ritika decide to start afresh and walk towards the direction of the lodge to begin their honeymoon once again.

== Cast ==
- Fardeen Khan as Abhay Sachdeva
- Esha Deol as Ritika Khanna Sachdeva (Ritu)
- Bikram Saluja as Rishabh
- Perizaad Zorabian as Ananya 'Anu'
- Eijaz Khan as Deepak, Abhay's friend
- Anita Hassanandani as Amrita, Ritika's friend
- Kirron Kher as Shobha Chaturvedi
- Satish Shah as Mr. Chaturvedi
- Raj Zutshi as Arjun Kohli/A.K.
- Tarina Patel as Sarah
- Mukul Dev as Shoaib Mirza
- Sadiya Siddiqui as Anaiya Mirza
- Lubna Salim as Nandini Sachdeva, Abhay's sister
- Kiran Karmarkar as Rohit, Abhay's brother-in-law

== Music ==
Just Married

Soundtrack album by Pritam
- Released: 30 December 2006 (Digital Release); 16 March 2007 (Film Release)
- Genre: filmi
- Length: 36:51
- Producer: Pritam

Pritam chronology
Hattrick (2006)	Just Married (2006)	Kya Love Story Hai (2007)

All lyrics are written by Gulzar; all music is composed by Pritam.

No.	Title	Singer(s)	Length
1.	"Ram Milaye Jodi"	Sukhwinder Singh, Sunidhi Chauhan & Shaan	3:57
2.	"Gudgudee"	Sunidhi Chauhan	4:44
3.	"Baat Pakki" (Version I)	Shaan & Neeraj Shridhar	4:18
4.	"Doha"	Daler Mehndi	3:57
5.	"Baat Pakki" (Remix)	Shaan, Sunidhi Chauhan, Mahalaxmi Iyer & Sukhwinder Singh	3:56
6.	"Jagte Raho"	Sonu Nigam	5:57
7.	"Ram Milaye Jodi" (Remix)	Sukhwinder Singh	4:33
8.	"Baat Pakki" (Version II)	Shaan, Sunidhi Chauhan, Mahalaxmi Iyer & Sukhwinder Singh	4:18
9.	"Ram Milaye Jodi" (Sad)	Sukhwinder Singh	1:29
Total length:			36:51
