= Mere Dost Picture Abhi Baki Hai =

- Promotional
- Directed by: Rajnish Thakur
- Written by: Rajnish Thakur
- Produced by: Narendra Singh
- Starring: Sunil Shetty; Rajpal Yadav; Om Puri; Udita Goswami
- Cinematography: Surindra Rao
- Edited by: Aarif Sheikh
- Music by: Sukhwinder Singh; Subash Pradhan; Parvez Qadir; Rajendra Shiv
- Distributed by: FilmyBox Movies
- Release date: 20 July 2012
- Running time: 149 minutes
- Country: India
- Language: Hindi

Mere Dost Picture Abhi Baki Hai (transl. My friend, the film isn't over yet) is a 2012 Indian Hindi-language comedy film directed by Rajnish Thakur and produced by Narendra Singh. The film stars Sunil Shetty, Udita Goswami, Rajpal Yadav and Om Puri. The film's title was apparently adapted from a scene of Om Shanti Om featuring Shah Rukh Khan saying "Picture Abhi Baki Hai, Mere Dost (The film isn't over yet, my friend)".

== Plot ==
Picture Abhi Baki Hai is the journey of Amar Joshi, who runs a video library in Benaras and aspires to be a film maker. Despite facing objections from his father, Amar Joshi decides to sell his video library and join a film institute in London.

After completing his course, he lands in the "city of dreams", Mumbai, to make his film. Suraj is a struggling actor doing bit roles in TV serials who is Amar's only connection in Bollywood.

Amar's starts his struggle to make his film by meeting different types of producers who have their own take on Amar's story. After many failed attempts, he finally bumps into Monty Chadda (), a PR publicity man who sees good potential in Amar and decides to produce his film.

Amar & Monty take help of star secretary Guptaji to convince Mohini and her starry mother Mummyji who agrees to do the film.

Amar's film starts, But is stalled all of a sudden when Monty suddenly disappears. Amar is summoned by Sudama Bhosle a don who was financing his film. He wants Amar to complete his film and also wants him to cast his girlfriend "Tina", Amar reluctantly agrees as he has no option. But as luck would have it Sudama Bhosle is shot dead and Amar's film is stalled once again. Monty Chaddha resurfaces again and decides to make Amar's Film into a magnum opus. so a veteran silver jubilee writer Mr. Baig is brought on board. Once in, Mr. Baig takes over the reins of the film from Amar and changes it into a totally different film.

What follows is a chain of events which gives the audience a never seen before insight into the modus operandi of how films are generally made in Bollywood, the largest film industry of the world.

== Cast ==
- Sunil Shetty as Amar Joshi
- Udita Goswami as Mohini
- Rajpal Yadav as Suraj
- Om Puri as Baig Saab
- Neena Gupta as Mummyji
- Rakesh Bedi as Monty
- Akhil Mishra as Guptaji
- Shayan Munshi as Hero
- Kurush Deboo as Producer
- Rajeev Verma as Amar's father
- Mumaith Khan as Tina
- Deepak Shirke as Sudama Bhosle
- Deepal Shaw as Sudama's girlfriend
- Razak Khan as Anand Godbole, the absusive director
- Rana Jung Bahadur as Ashish Thakral
- Sudhir as Janardan/ Johny D. Costa
- Falguni Rajani as maid in Indu Verma's film family
- Shawar Ali as Hero
- Avtar Gill
- Suresh Menon
- Sonali Sachdev
- Dinesh Hingoo
- Vikas Shrivastav

== Soundtrack ==
No.	Title	Singer(s)	Length
1.	"Salaam E Ishq Tu"	Sunidhi Chauhan	5:02
2.	"Sanam Sanam"	Shaan, Shraddha Pandit
3.	"Chala Hai Joshi"	Parvez Quadir
4.	"Zindagi Aa Mere Pass"	Sukhwinder Singh
5.	"It's Rain Rain"	Sukhwinder Singh, Sunidhi Chauhan
6.	"Koi Na Samjha"	Parvez Quadir
7.	"Picture Abhi Baki Hai"	Shabab Sabri
