= Chase (2010 film) =

- Directed by: Jag Mundhra
- Produced by: Anuj Saxena
- Starring: Anuj Saxena; Udita Goswami; Sameer Kochhar; Aditya Raj Kapoor; Ashok Banthia; Tareena Patel; Rajesh Khattar; Shweta Menon
- Cinematography: Uday Tiwari
- Edited by: Ram Singh
- Distributed by: Maverick Productions
- Release date: 30 April 2010
- Running time: 103 minutes
- Country: India
- Language: Hindi
- Box office: est. ₹5.0 crore

Chase is a 2010 Indian Hindi-language action film directed by Jag Mundhra. The film stars Anuj Saxena, Udita Goswami, Sameer Kochhar and Tareena Patel in the lead roles, with Gulshan Grover making a special appearance. It was released on April 30, 2010. The musical score was composed by Udbhav Ojha and Vijay Verma, with lyrics by Jalees Sherwani, Manthan and Prashant Vasl. The title song is sung by Sajid Khan, while other songs were performed by Shaan, Shreya Ghoshal, and Vasundhara Das. The background musical score is by Amar Mohile.

== Plot ==
The main character in Chase is Sohail Ansari (Anuj Saxena), an ex-BSF Commando on the run. DIG Ranveer Tyagi (Rajesh Khattar) is interested in solving the murder of the State Industries Minister Vishwajeet Rana, in which Sohail is implicated and possesses crucial information. Inspector Siddharth (Sameer Kochhar), working closely with the DIG, is monitoring Sohail's actions. Sohail is pursued by Siddharth and the police, during which he is injured and captured. On the advice of Dr. AK Sehgal (Denzil Smith), Sohail is sent under police protection to the Neurological Research Institute in Panchgani for observation and rehabilitation. Nupur Chauhan (Udita Goswami), a nurse assigned to Sohail, discovers he is not in a vegetative state but is pretending, and along the way falling for him, and after understanding his cause, she assists him in escaping from the police.

Other characters include Surabhee (Tareena Patel), a TV journalist and Sohail's love interest, and industrialist Anil Khanna (Aditya Raj Kapoor), who seeks government approval for his Rs 1000 crore power plant project. Additionally, Anthony D'Costa (Gulshan Grover) is also searching for the truth. The narrative follows the pursuit of Sohail and the quest for truth through the streets of Mumbai, highlighting the potential impact on the political system and the blurred lines between truth and deception.

== Cast ==
- Anuj Saxena as Sohail Ansari
- Udita Goswami as Nupur Pradhan
- Geeta Khanna as Rosy Aunty, the rehab nurse
- Aditya Raj Kapoor as Anil Khanna, the industrialist
- Ashok Banthia as Vishwajeet Rana, the Udyog Mantri
- Tareena Patel as Surabhee Patel, TV journalist
- Rajesh Khattar as DIG Ranveer Tyagi
- Gulshan Grover as Anthony D'Costa
- Sanjay Mishra as Haricharan Dubey, the rehab patient
- Sameer Kochhar as Inspector Siddharth Sharma
- Shweta Menon as Kareena Chopra (in a special appearance as Dubey's hallucination)
- Denzil Smith as Dr. A.K. Sehgal, Dean
- Ravi Jhankal as Abdul Kareem, antique shop owner
- Nuzhat Siddiqui as the Orphanage nun
- Anil Kumar as the CCTY main operator
- Krunal Pandit as Star News reader
- Vishwas Sharma as Pradhan, the new Udyog Mantri

== Box office ==
Upon its release, the film underperformed at the box office, collecting a total net gross of Rs. 4,500,000 during its first two weeks. It was a commercial failure in India.
