= Running Wild (1987 TV series) =

1980s British television series

- Genre: Sitcom
- Created by: Philip Trewinnard
- Written by: Philip Trewinnard
- Directed by: Vic Finch (1987); Derrick Goodwin (1989)
- Starring: Ray Brooks; Janet Key; Michelle Collins; Peter Amory; Berwick Kaler (series 1); Brigit Forsyth (series 2)
- Country of origin: United Kingdom
- Original language: English
- No. of series: 2
- No. of episodes: 13

Production
- Producers: Marcus Plantin (1987); Derrick Goodwin (1989)
- Production locations: London, England, UK
- Running time: 30 minutes
- Production company: LWT

Original release
- Network: ITV
- Release: 6 March 1987 – 4 June 1989

Running Wild is an 1980s British sitcom written and created by Philip Trewinnard and starring Ray Brooks, Janet Key, Michelle Collins, Peter Amory with Berwick Kaler for series 1 and Brigit Forsyth for series 2, which ran between 6 March 1987 and 4 June 1989. It was made for the ITV network by LWT and recorded at the London Studios.

== Plot ==
Max Wild (Ray Brooks) yearns to re-live his 1950s youth, when, as a rocking and rolling Teddy Boy, he jived in his crepe-soled shoes to the jukebox sounds, and dropped out of art school to pursue the lifestyle of a bohemian. Now, alas, he is married and the nearest he gets to the fifties is his age - he's 45 and rising. However, with his student daughter Stephanie (Michelle Collins) now an adult herself and no longer in need of a morally upright father, and bored with his job as an environmental health officer for the local council, Max sets out to recapture his golden days, donning his drainpipe trousers once more and leaving his family for garrets new and even loftier plans to write a rock opera, Firestar. But although he can wear bootlace ties he cannot break the ties that bind, often returning to his estranged wife Babs (Janet Key).

By the second series, set a year after the first, Max has tired of reliving his past and wants to return home to wife and daughter. But, with new men-friends and a blossoming career in PR, Babs has other plans. However, the sudden presence of her sister Jenny, who has moved in because her marriage has broken down, upsets the apple cart, as does Stephanie's announcement that she's pregnant with her boyfriend Rob's baby, news that infuriates her mother and so sends the daughter scurrying to her father.

== Cast ==
- Ray Brooks as Max Wild
- Janet Key as Babs Wild
- Michelle Collins as Stephanie Wild
- Peter Amory as Rob
- Berwick Kaler as Tom Coleman (Series 1)
- Brigit Forsyth as Jenny (Series 2)

== Episodes ==
=== Series overview ===
Series	Episodes	Originally released	
Series	Episodes	First released	Last released
1	6	6 March 1987	10 April 1987
2	7	23 April 1989	4 June 1989

=== Series 1 (1987) ===
No. overall	No. in series	Title	Directed by	Written by	Original release date
1	1	"Wild and Free"	Vic Finch	Philip Trewinnard	6 March 1987
2	2	"The Last of the Red Hot Rock 'n' Rollers"	Vic Finch	Philip Trewinnard	13 March 1987
3	3	"The Music Man"	Vic Finch	Philip Trewinnard	20 March 1987
4	4	"The Doomsday Book"	Vic Finch	Philip Trewinnard	27 March 1987
5	5	"Echoes"	Vic Finch	Philip Trewinnard	3 April 1987
6	6	"Wanderlust"	Vic Finch	Philip Trewinnard	10 April 1987

=== Series 2 (1989) ===
No. overall	No. in series	Title	Directed by	Written by	Original release date
7	1	"Episode 1"	Derrick Goodwin	Philip Trewinnard	23 April 1989
8	2	"Episode 2"	Derrick Goodwin	Philip Trewinnard	30 April 1989
9	3	"Episode 3"	Derrick Goodwin	Philip Trewinnard	7 May 1989
10	4	"Episode 4"	Derrick Goodwin	Philip Trewinnard	14 May 1989
11	5	"Episode 5"	Derrick Goodwin	Philip Trewinnard	21 May 1989
12	6	"Episode 6"	Derrick Goodwin	Philip Trewinnard	28 May 1989
13	7	"Episode 7"	Derrick Goodwin	Philip Trewinnard	4 June 1989

== Home media ==
To this date, the series was not yet released on DVD or VHS.
