= Sibaji Bandyopadhyay =

Indian writer

Sibaji Bandyopadhyay (born 16 November 1954) is an Indian author, critic, academic, theorist and performer, who writes in Bengali and English. His interests lie in the fields of Bengali and English literature, literary theory, philosophy, feminism, sexuality, cinema and psychoanalysis.

== Life ==
He was born in Kolkata in 1954 to Chinmoyee and Niranjan Bandyopadhyay. Upon finishing his Senior Cambridge from Cambrian Hall, Dehradun in 1971, Sibaji pursued an undergraduate degree in mathematics from St. Xavier's College, Kolkata. Sibaji received his MA (1982) and Ph.D (1991) in comparative literature from Jadavpur University.

== Works ==
Sibaji began his career as a temporary lecturer in Bengali and English literature at the Government College of Art and Craft, Kolkata in 1983. He joined the department of Comparative Literature at Jadavpur University in 1986, where he taught until 2004. Sibaji was professor of Cultural Studies at the Centre for Studies of Social Sciences, Calcutta between 2004 and 2014. Sibaji is among the first scholars to have worked on the poetry of Jibanananda Das. He is celebrated for his influential work on Bengali children's literature and colonialism, a subject he revisited in numerous monographs. His more contemporary interests lie in the fields of Mahabharata and the Bhagavad Gita. In 2013, Rituparno Ghosh cast Sibaji in his film Satyanweshi, an adaptation of Saradindu Bandyopadhyay's celebrated story from the Byomkesh Bakshi series. He also worked in the films Alinagarer Golokdhadha, Bibaho Obhijaan, and Guptodhoner Sandhane.

== Awards ==
Sibaji was awarded the Vidyasagar Memorial Award in 2010 by the West Bengal Government for life-time-achievement in Bengali prose. He also received the Sisir Kumar Das Memorial Award in 2010 for his contributions to Bengali literature.

== Selected publications ==
Bengali
Essays

- Prasanga Jibanananda (2011)
- Gopal Rakhal Dwandasamas: Upanibeshbad O Bangla Shishu Sahitya (2013)
- Abar Shishu-Sikkha (2010)
- Bangla Upanyase Ora (2002)
- Bangla Shishu Shahityer Chhoto Meyera (2007)
- Galileo (2007)
- Alibabar Guptabhandar: Prabandha Sankalan (2009)

Other Writings

- Madhyarekha (2009)
- Ekti Barir Golpo (2013)
- Uttampurush Ekbachan: Ekti Bhan (2002)
- Guhalipi (2002)
- Bhoot-bishayak Ekti Upanyaser Khasra
- Bhoot na Put (1996)
- Tipu Sultaner Swapna [translation of Girish Karnad's English Play: Dreams of Tipu Sultan] (2010)
- Lekha na Lekha Kabita (2019)

English
Essays

- An anthology of essays in English (2012)
- Through a Trap-door: A Performative Response to Chittrovanu Mazumdar (2013)

Edited Volumes

- Mahabharata Now: Narrative, Aesthetics, Ethics [co-edited with Arindam Chakrabarti] (2014)
- Thematology (2004)
