= Sofia Hayat =

English singer, actress and model (born 1974)

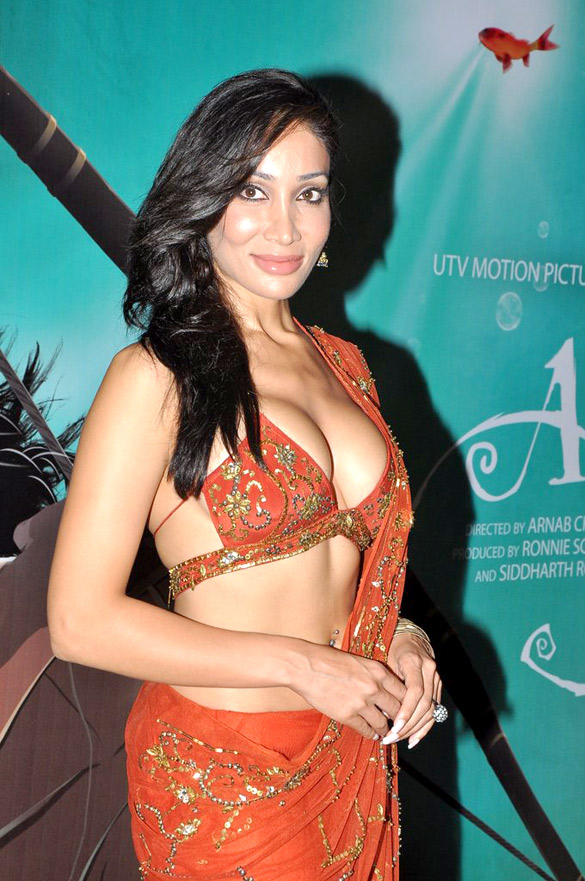
- Sofia Hayat
- Born: 6 December 1974 (age 51); Gravesend, Kent, England
- Education: University of Brighton
- Occupations: Singer, actress and model
- Television: Bigg Boss 7
- Spouse: Vlad Stanescu (m. 2017–2018)

Sofia Hayat is an English singer, actress and television personality known for her appearances in Indian television and cinema. She participated in Bigg Boss 7, the Indian version of Big Brother, in 2013.

== Early and personal life ==
Hayat was born to Muslim parents and raised in Gravesend, Kent in 1974. She is of Pakistani and Indian heritage and pursued a degree in performing arts from the University of Brighton.

In her autobiography Dishonoured: How I Escaped An Arranged Marriage And Survived An Honour Killing To Become A Star (2009; John Blake Publishing Ltd.) she discussed her troubled relationship with her conservative family including a forced arranged marriage in Pakistan and how she escaped it (including a subsequent planned honour killing) to begin a career in entertainment.

She married Romanian Vlad Stanescu in April 2017 but they separated after a year. Hayat claimed that he had tried to scam her out of her London property.

== Media career ==
In July 2012, Hayat was named the new "Curvy Icon" by Vogue Italia. In September 2013, Hayat was named on the FHM sexiest women in the world list, in position 81.

She was a contestant on Bigg Boss 7 in 2013. She entered as a wild card entry but got evicted on 12th week on 8 December 2013 (Day 84).

She has released two music albums, Dishonour and Wisdom of The Mother.

== Television ==
Year	Name	Role	Notes	Ref(s)
2002	Zee Music TV SKY	Presenter		
2003	Absolute Power	Shanti		
2004	Bollywood Star	Contestant		
2005	Footballers Wive$: Overtime	Zuki		
2008	Waterloo Road	Jones		
2009	Fur TV	Lucia		
2010	Jonathan Creek	Selima El Sharad		
2012	Superdude	Host	Along with Ashmit Patel & Madhura Naik	
2013	Welcome – Baazi Mehmaan Nawazi Ki	Contestant		
2013	Bigg Boss 7	Contestant	Evicted, Day 84	
2014	The Midnight Beast	Sloman's Wife		
2016	Comedy Nights Bachao	Guest	Along with Rakhi Sawant	

== Filmography ==
- 2007 Exitz as Beauty
- 2008 Cash and Curry as Dharmi
- 2009 The Unforgettable
- 2012 Diary of a Butterfly (Hindi) as Carol
- 2012 Naachle London as Rani
- 2013 Bollywood Carmen for BBC as Sophia
- 2016 Six X as Ashmit Patel's Girlfriend
- 2017 Aksar 2

=== Discography ===
- 2015 "Mein Ladki Hoon" (Music Video)

== Spirituality ==
In June 2016, Hayat announced that she had embraced spirituality and become a nun. She adopted the name Gaia Sofia Mother.
