= Diary of a Butterfly =

- Theatrical release poster
- Directed by: Vinod Mukhi
- Written by: Asad Ajmeri
- Produced by: Anil Kumar
- Starring: Udita Goswami; Sofia Hayat; Sneha Belani; Ronny Jhutti; Rajeev Singh; Harsh Chhaya; Rajesh Khattar; Aryan Vaid
- Cinematography: Mohan Verma & Mohan Prajapati
- Music by: Mukhtar Sahota; Taz – Stereonation; Shibani Kashyap
- Distributed by: Bhaggyashri Production
- Release date: 2 March 2012
- Running time: 107 minutes
- Country: India
- Language: Hindi
- Budget: INR 32.5 million

Diary of a Butterfly is a 2012 Indian Hindi-language thriller drama film directed by Vinod Mukhi and written by Asad Ajmeri. The film stars Udita Goswami as a female protagonist. The film is produced by Anil Kumar under the banner of Bhaggyashri Production.

== Story ==
This is a story about a girl named Gul, who starts her journey for success from her hometown Jaipur, she is hungry for success so she decides to go to the city of dreams, Mumbai, when she is leaving for Mumbai, her mother gives her a diary says to Gul that it will be very helpful if she records her day-to-day activities in the diary, she also gives her a note, on which there are some knowledgeable lines written.

In Mumbai, she works for a fashion house, she stays with her friends Piya, who works as an accountant in the same fashion house, and with Carol, who is an owner of a Spa.

When she starts her journey in Mumbai she forgets each and every relationship in the thirst for success. She uses people as stairs in her journey of life in order to reach to the top. She even takes the Diary and the Note as a joke. But when she reaches the peak, she finds out that while running for success she has hurt many people knowingly or sometimes even without any intention. She had abused many people who tried to correct her and now currently she has nobody to celebrate her newfound success. Her errant and reckless lifestyle and line approach to achieve her goal made her lose every friend in life.

So she starts reading her diary from the start just to find out if she has treated someone to the worst degree. Also the Notes Lines starts ringing in her head helping her realize her mistakes and also telling her to apologize to them.

When she decides to correct all the mistakes she has made in the past i.e. to apologize to each and everyone she has hurt, she finds out the truth about Mumbai and the Corporate World. She is so shocked seeing the response of the people that she decides to stay the way she is. She also refuses to listen to her Mother because she thinks because of the Diary and the Note she went to correct things which in-turn became a joke on herself.

Arrogant, Reckless, Social and a Dreamer who will continue her journey for more success but in her own way.

== Cast ==
- Udita Goswami as Gul
- Sofia Hayat as Carol
- Sneha Belani as Pia
- Ronny Jhutti as Adi
- Rajeev Singh as Aran
- Harsh Chhaya as Vivek
- Rajesh Khattar as Xavier
- Aryan Vaid as Ravi Bajaj
- Naseer Abdullah as Gul’s father
- Gaurav Dixit as Aakash
- Johnny Nirmal as Delete Singh
- Rati Agnihotri as Shobha

== Soundtrack ==
Music of the film is composed by Mukhtar Sahota, Taz – Stereonation, and Shibani Kashyap, whereas the lyrics have been penned down by Arif Lohar, Arko and Virag Mishra. The singers are lined up as Taz – Stereonation, Arif Lohar, Shibani Kashyap, Vasuda Sharma, Akriti Kakkar & Apeksha Dandekar.

Track listing
No.	Title	Artist(s)	Length
1.	"Alif Allah (Jugni)"	Arif Lohar, Mukhtar Sahota	04:27
2.	"We Don’t Need Boys"	Akriti Kakkar, Apeksha Dandekar	04:08
3.	"Hor Pila De"	Taz-Stereo Nation	03:10
4.	"Hungama Ho Gaya"	Shibani Kashyap	03:34
5.	"Jugni Dhol Mix"	Arif Lohar, Mukhtar Sahota	04:29

== Reception ==
The film opened to negative reviews. Faisal Saif of Global Movie magazine gave 1 out of 5 stars and wrote "Painful experience sleaze fest filled with extremely bad performances". DNA India wrote "Doesn't seem completely devoid and potential". Komal Nahta of koimoi.com gave 1/2 star out of 5 and wrote "Apology of a story, Below the mark performance".
