= Cambrian Hall =

- Badge of the Cambrian Hall

Location
- Dehradun Cantt, Dehradun, Uttarakhand; India; 30.34152°N 78.03247°E

Information
- Type: Private
- Established: 1954
- Founder: Col. Shashi Shumshere J. B. Rana
- Head of school: Samuel Jaideep
- Enrollment: 1600
- Colours: Yellow & Blue
- Affiliation: Indian Certificate of Secondary Education Examination (ICSE)
- Website: www.cambrianhall.in

Cambrian Hall is a private school located in the Dehradun, Uttarakhand, India. It is a co-educational, English-medium, residential day school which participates in the Council for the Indian School Certificate Examinations.

Cambrian Hall is located near ONGC, in the Cantonment, Dehradun. Founded in 1954 by Col. Shashi Shamsher Jung Bahadur Rana, the school is now run by a board. Today, the school has over 1600 students.

Sports played at the school include hockey, football, cricket, basketball, volleyball, badminton, cross country, athletics, P.T., gymnastics, and table tennis.

Cambrian Hall has produced many well-known figures across Nepal's business landscape. Alumni include members of the Rara factory family, graduates of the London School of Economics who went on to chair major Nepali banks, founded major Nepali IT companies, and leading executive roles at Microsoft.

== Alumni ==
- Bipin Rawat, (Chief of Army Staff of the Indian Army)
- Rajesh Kumar
- Udita Goswami
- Shruti Ulfat
- Sibaji Bandyopadhyay
- Baba Sehgal
