= Don't Stop Dreaming =

- Directed by: Aditya Raj Kapoor
- Written by: Aditya Raj Kapoor; Ray Panthaki
- Produced by: Munir Ahmad
- Starring: Rishi Kapoor; Sunil Shetty; Richard Blackwood; Michelle Collins
- Cinematography: Mahesh Aney
- Music by: Taz
- Production company: Stereo Nation Pictures
- Distributed by: Electro Centre
- Release date: 16 March 2007 (UK)
- Running time: 104 minutes
- Country: United Kingdom
- Language: English

Don't Stop Dreaming is a 2007 British film directed by Aditya Raj Kapoor, produced by Munir Ahmad and set in Birmingham, England. Bollywood actors Rishi Kapoor and Sunil Shetty, EastEnders actress Michelle Collins, DJ and actor Richard Blackwood and singer Taz in his acting debut star in the film, which was released on 16 March 2007. The film was filmed in Birmingham.

== Cast ==
- Rishi Kapoor as Groovy
- Sunil Shetty as Dave
- Michelle Collins
- Richard Blackwood
- Taz as Channi Singh
- Ronny Jhutti
- Junior Simpson
- Jags Klimax
- Sigga as Gabby
- Henry Paulinski
- Serena Verdi
- Tarlochan Singh Bilga
- Matt McCooey as Bobby

== Release ==
BBC gave the film a rating of one out of five stars and wrote that "With a cast that comprises Bollywood C-listers, known British TV "stars", evidently with time on their hands, and a band of multi-ethnic "actors, " the worst of East and West combine for this fine example of how not to make a film".
