= Vicki Psarias =

Filmmaker, writer and author based in Yorkshire, England

Vicki Psarias / Vicki Broadbent
- Born: 1980 (age 45–46); Leeds, Yorkshire
- Other name: Broadbent
- Education: Goldsmiths, University of London
- Occupations: Author, writer, director, filmmaker, creator
- Known for: Writing, broadcast work and advocating for maternal rights.
- Television: Good Morning Britain, BBC Breakfast, BBC World News, Channel 5 News, This Morning, Lorraine and SKY News.
- Spouse: Peter Broadbent
- Children: 3
- Parents: George Psarias (father); Vasoulla Psarias (mother)
- Awards: Best Baby & Parent Blog- UK Blog Awards, BritMums Best Blogger, Best Social Media, The Square Mile Magazine Worldspreads 30 Under 30 London Talent Awards, Channel 4 4Talent Award: Best Filmmaker.
- Website: www.honestmum.com

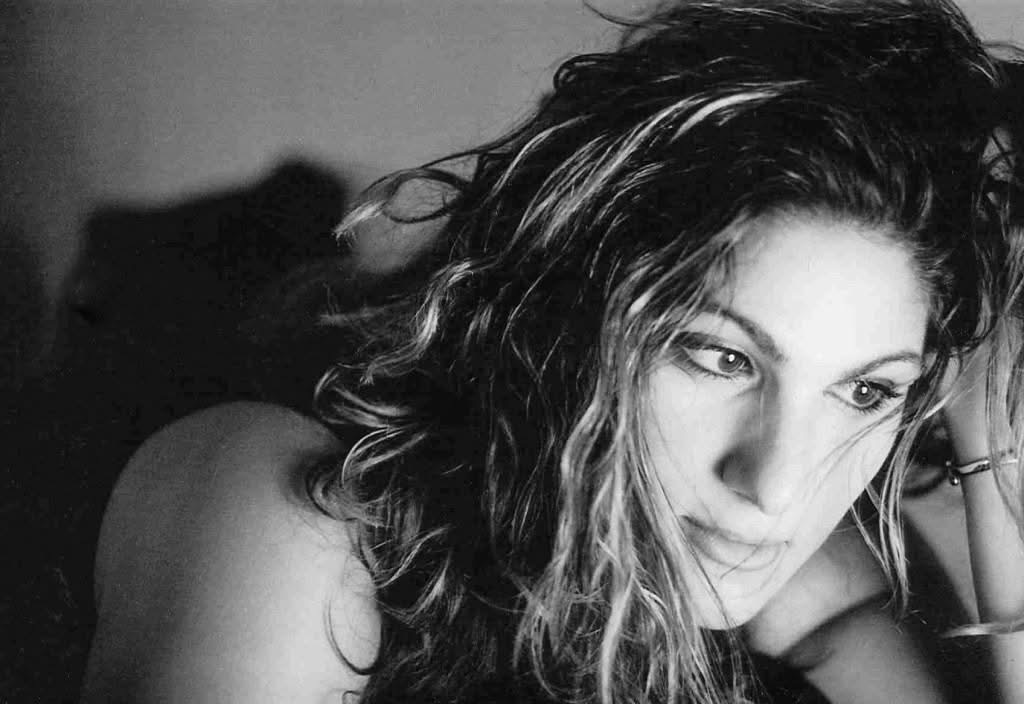
Portrait in black and white by Dr William Wynn-Jones.

Vicki Psarias-Broadbent is a filmmaker and author based in Yorkshire, England. She is known as the author of the children's book "Greek Myths, Folktales & Legends" (published in 2025), "Mumboss" (published in 2018) and "The Working Mom" in the US and Canada (published in 2020). She is also the founder and editor of Honest Mum, a parenting blog. Psarias has written and directed short films, as well as directing and producing TV documentaries and drama.

Psarias has been sourced as a subject matter expert in women's health, parenting, business, food, and fashion by The Scotsman, Huffington Post, and more.

Her MA graduation film Rifts won awards at film festivals worldwide, including the European Commissioned Euromedcafe International Short Film Competition. Her subsequent short film, Broken, was well received. After working at Redbus (now Lionsgate UK), she wrote and directed Broken.

Since 2004, Psarias has directed drama, TV documentaries, music videos, adverts, and short films. Psarias won the Channel 4 Talent Award for Best Filmmaker in 2007 and The Square Mile Magazine Worldspreads 30 Under 30 London Talent Awards.

== Publication history ==
"Greek Myths, Folktales and Legends"(ISBN 070233975X) was published by Scholastic UK in their Classics Series for 8-12 year olds, in September 2025.

"The Working Mom" US and Canadian edition of Mumboss (ISBN 9780349428536) was published by Piatkus Publishing, Little, Brown, Hachette in 2020.

"Mumboss: The Honest Mum's Guide To Surviving and Thriving at Work and at Home" (ISBN 0349416699) was published by Piatkus Publishing, Little, Brown, Hachette UK in 2018.

== Personal life ==
Psarias lives with her husband, Peter Broadbent, and three children, Oliver, Alexander, and Florence who sometimes appear on TV and online with her.
