= Say Yes to Love (film) =

- Directed by: Mahrukh Mirza
- Written by: Mahrukh Mirza
- Produced by: Chetan Handoo; Saira Mirza; Deepak Wadhwa
- Cinematography: Deepak Duggal
- Edited by: Sanjay Jaiswal
- Music by: Surendra Singh Sodhi
- Release date: 2012
- Running time: 115 minutes
- Country: India
- Language: Hindi

Say Yes to Love is a 2012 Hindi romance film directed by Marukh Miraz Beig.

== Plot ==
Vijay (Aasad Mirza) is a young, shy boy who was molested by a prostitute. This devastated and traumatised him. He develops a fear of falling in love until he meets Sarah Jones (Nazia Hussain), a beautiful girl who brings about a change in Vijay's life.

== Release ==
The released date announced is 16 March 2012

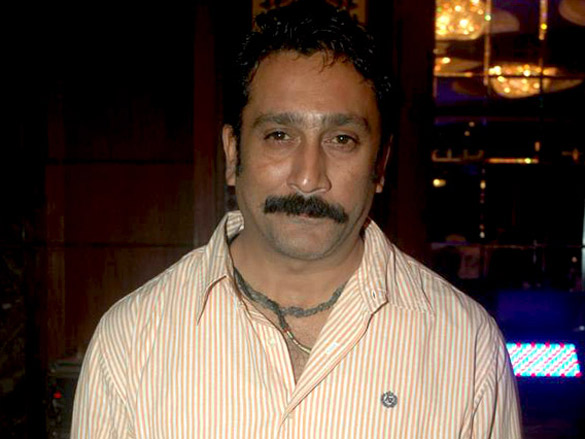
Mukesh Tiwari audio release Say Yes to Love

== Soundtrack ==
1. "Aaj Ye Bewajah" - Sunidhi Chauhan
2. "Dhoondoo Mahfilon Mein Wo Jawan" - Sunidhi Chauhan
3. "Jab Se Dekha Hai Tujhe" - Shaan & Khushi
4. "Jinka Asar Kab Se Hai" - Sonu Nigam
5. "Koi Kaam Aisa Kar Du" - Shaan
6. "Tum Pe Hi Marta Hai Ye Dil" - Sonu Nigam
7. "Yaaden Tere Naam" - Jatin Pandit
8. "Ye Zindagi" - Sonu Nigam & Pritha Mazumder
