= Rishi Kapoor =

Indian actor (1952–2020)

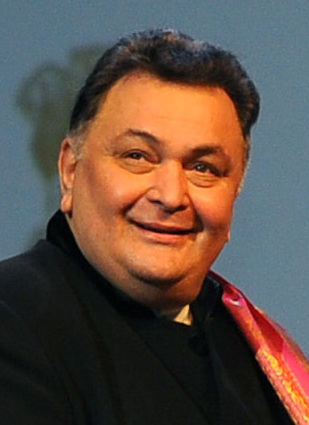
- Kapoor in 2016
- Born: Rishi Raj Kapoor; 4 September 1952; Bombay, India
- Died: 30 April 2020 (aged 67); Mumbai, Maharashtra, India
- Occupations: Actor; director; producer
- Years active: 1970–2020
- Works: Full list
- Spouse: Neetu Singh (m. 1980)
- Children: Riddhima Kapoor; Ranbir Kapoor
- Father: Raj Kapoor
- Family: Kapoor family

Rishi Raj Kapoor (4 September 1952 – 30 April 2020) was an Indian actor, and filmmaker who worked in Hindi cinema. Kapoor was the recipient of several accolades, including a National Film Award and four Filmfare Awards.

Born into the Kapoor family, he made his debut, as an adolescent, in his father Raj Kapoor's film Mera Naam Joker, for which he won the National Film Award for Best Child Artist. As an adult, his first lead role was opposite Dimple Kapadia in the teen romance Bobby, which won him the Filmfare Award for Best Actor. Between 1973 and 2000, Kapoor starred as the romantic lead in 92 films. He starred in several successful films from the mid-1970s to the 1990s, such as Kabhi Kabhie, Laila Majnu, Amar Akbar Anthony, Hum Kisise Kum Nahin, Sargam, Naseeb, Kaatilon Ke Kaatil, Prem Rog, Coolie, Nagina, Chandni, Henna, Deewana, Bol Radha Bol and Damini. He also received acclaim for his performances in Khel Khel Mein, Rafoo Chakkar, Barood, Naya Daur, Jhoota Kahin Ka, Karz, Yeh Vaada Raha, Bade Dilwala, Saagar, Tawaif, Ek Chadar Maili Si and Hathyar.

From the 2000s onwards, Kapoor transitioned to character roles, receiving further critical acclaim in films such as Hum Tum, Fanaa, Namastey London, Love Aaj Kal, Agneepath, Housefull 2, Aurangzeb, Shuddh Desi Romance, 102 Not Out and Mulk. For his performance in Do Dooni Chaar, he won the Filmfare Award for Best Actor (Critics), and for his role in the ensemble family drama Kapoor & Sons, he won the Filmfare Award for Best Supporting Actor. He was honoured with the Filmfare Lifetime Achievement Award in 2008. His final film appearance was in Sharmaji Namkeen (2022), which was released posthumously.

Kapoor met his wife, actress Neetu Singh, while working in films. They have 2 children, including the actor Ranbir Kapoor. He died of leukemia on 30 April 2020, aged 67.

== Early life and family ==
Rishi Raj Kapoor was born on 4 September 1952 at his family's home, Raj Kapoor Bungalow, in Matunga, South Bombay, in the then-Bombay State of India, into a Punjabi Hindu Khatri family of the Kapoor clan, from Peshawar and originally from Samundri, to parents Raj Kapoor and Krishna Malhotra. He attended Colonel Brown Cambridge School in Dehradun, Campion School in Bombay and Mayo College in Ajmer.

Part of the Kapoor family, he was the second son of legendary actor-director Raj Kapoor and Krishna Raj Kapoor (née Malhotra). Likewise, his family encompasses a successful line of actors, including brothers, Randhir and Rajiv Kapoor; paternal grandfather Prithviraj Kapoor; paternal granduncle Trilok Kapoor, maternal uncles Prem, Rajendra, and Narendra Nath, as well as Prem Chopra; paternal uncles Shashi Kapoor and Shammi Kapoor. Rishi Kapoor's two sisters are late Ritu Nanda, who was an insurance agent, and Rima Jain. The actresses Karisma Kapoor and Kareena Kapoor, the actors Armaan Jain and Aadar Jain, and Nitasha Nanda and the businessman Nikhil Nanda are his nieces and nephews.

== Career ==
Around the age of three, Kapoor's first on-screen appearance was a cameo in his father Raj Kapoor's film Shree 420 (1955), where he would appear in the musical sequence of "Pyaar Hua, Iqraar Hua Hai". Likewise, Raj Kapoor would direct the film that provided Rishi his debut role, the 1970 film Mera Naam Joker, in which the actor would portray the young version of the lead character (played by Raj Kapoor). His performance in the film earned him the National Film Award for Best Child Artist.

Rishi Kapoor's first leading role in adulthood came opposite Dimple Kapadia, in the 1973 teen romance Bobby, also directed by his father. Bobby went on to become one of the decade's biggest hits in India, and earned him the Filmfare Award for Best Actor. Regarding the film, he would say in a 2012 interview: "There was a misconception that the film was made to launch me as an actor. The film was actually made to pay the debts of Mera Naam Joker. Dad wanted to make a teenage love story and he did not have money to cast Rajesh Khanna in the film." Following Bobby (1973), he starred in several light-hearted comedies within that decade, including, among others: Khel Khel Mein (1975) and Rafoo Chakkar (1975) with Neetu Singh; Amar Akbar Anthony (1977) with Amitabh Bachchan and Vinod Khanna; and Hum Kisise Kum Naheen (1977) with Zeenat Aman.

Kapoor worked with actress Neetu Singh for the first time in Zahreela Insaan (1974). The two would go on to share screen space in multiple projects, including Kabhi Kabhie (1976) and Doosra Aadmi (1976), and would eventually marry in 1980. In 1980, Kapoor starred along with Tina Munim in Subhash Ghai's musical reincarnation thriller Karz (1980), which went on to become a cult classic with a highly popular soundtrack. In a role considered one of his career-best works, Kapoor played an idealistic Devdhar in the 1982 musical romantic drama Prem Rog, a film based on the concept of widow remarriage, co-starring Padmini Kolhapure, which earned him his second nomination for the Filmfare Award for Best Actor. Another highlight of his career was the musical romantic drama Saagar (1985), directed by noted director Ramesh Sippy, which saw Kapoor reunite with Dimple Kapadia, 12 years after they made their debuts in Bobby. He appeared as the second lead in several multi-starrer films in the 1980s such as Naseeb (1981), Kaatilon Ke Kaatil (1981), Coolie (1983), Dosti Dushmani (1986), Ghar Ghar Ki Kahani (1988) and Gharana (1989). In the 1986 drama Ek Chadar Maili Si, adapted from Rajendra Singh Bedi's novel of the same name, Kapoor would play a man forced by customs to marry his widowed sister-in-law, played by Hema Malini. He ended the decade on a high with Yash Chopra's blockbuster romantic musical Chandni (1989) starring as Sridevi's love interest, Rohit, a helpless romantic-turned-cripple, which earned him another nomination for the Filmfare Award for Best Actor.

In 1991, Kapoor starred along with Pakistani actress Zeba Bakhtiyar in Henna, a tale of love across national borders, which was envisioned by his father, Raj Kapoor, and directed by his elder brother Randhir Kapoor. Henna was India's submission for the Academy Award for Best Foreign Language Film. Kapoor also had a leading role in the 1993 film Damini, co-starring Meenakshi Seshadri and Sunny Deol, that went on to be considered a classic socially-oriented film. Between 1973 and 2000, Kapoor's other film roles (mainly as the romantic lead) include: Raaja (1975), Laila Majnu (1976), Sargam (1979), which earned him a nomination for the Filmfare Award for Best Actor, Bade Dil Wala (1983), Tawaif (1985), which earned him another nomination for the Filmfare Award for Best Actor, Bol Radha Bol (1992), Deewana (1992) and Karobaar (2000). Kapoor debuted as a director in Aa Ab Laut Chalen (1999) which starred Rajesh Khanna, Akshaye Khanna and Aishwarya Rai. This remained his sole directorial venture.

Kapoor successfully transitioned to character acting in the mid-2000s, going on to appear in several supporting roles, such as in Hum Tum (2004), Fanaa (2006), Namastey London (2007) and Love Aaj Kal (2009). In 2007, he appeared in Aditya Raj Kapoor's British English-language films Don't Stop Dreaming and Sambar Salsa.

In the 2010s, he played diverse roles such as the villain in Agneepath (2012), Aurangzeb (2013) and Kaanchi (2014); a gay dean in the coming-of-age romance Student of the Year (2012); and real-life mobster Dawood Ibrahim in the action thriller D–Day (2013). He appeared with his brother Randhir for the first time in the multi-starrer comedy Housefull 2 (2012). He won the Filmfare Award for Best Actor (Critics) for his role in Do Dooni Chaar (2010), playing a middle-aged father trying to buy his own car, starring alongside his wife Neetu Singh. He also bagged the Filmfare Award for Best Supporting Actor for his work in the ensemble family drama Kapoor & Sons (2016). He also appeared in the action comedy Besharam (2013) along with his wife Neetu and son Ranbir Kapoor.

After two decades, he reunited on-screen with frequent co-star Amitabh Bachchan in 102 Not Out (2018), in which the two play an old-aged father-son duo. In 2018, he appeared in the Netflix drama Rajma Chawal and received high critical acclaim for his portrayal of a Muslim in Mulk. In 2019, Kapoor had two releases: Jhootha Kahin Ka, a comedy-drama film directed by Smeep Kang; and The Body, co-starring Emraan Hashmi, a mystery-thriller written and directed by Jeethu Joseph. Released on 13 December 2019, The Body would be Kapoor's last film to be released during his lifetime.

At the time of his death on 30 April 2020, Hitesh Bhatia's Sharmaji Namkeen co-starring Juhi Chawla, was under production and a four-day schedule was pending at the time of Kapoor's death. Producer Honey Trehan on 8 May 2020 confirmed that the film will be released in theatres. In January 2021, it was reported that Paresh Rawal is going to complete Kapoor's unfinished portions of the film, and it was released on Amazon Prime Video on 31 March 2022.

== Personal life ==
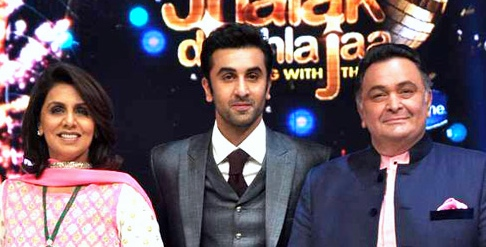
Kapoor with his wife Neetu Singh Kapoor and son Ranbir Kapoor at the show Jhalak Dikhhla Jaa in 2012

Kapoor married actress Neetu Singh, from New Delhi, also of Punjabi Khatri descent, in 1980. The couple had two children — son, actor Ranbir Kapoor, and a daughter, Riddhima Kapoor. Kapoor's autobiography Khullam Khulla: Rishi Kapoor Uncensored, was released on 15 January 2017. Kapoor wrote the book along with Meena Iyer, and the title was published under HarperCollins.

Kapoor was known to make controversial socio-political comments. In May 2016, he criticized the Nehru–Gandhi family over naming of roads, buildings and national assets in the name of Gandhi and Nehru, namely the Bandra–Worli Sea Link in Mumbai and the Hyderabad Airport. In September 2017, he again took on the Gandhi family by slamming Rahul Gandhi over dynastic politics. In March 2020, he expressed anger and criticized the Judicial system of India with the "Tareekh Pe Tareekh" phrase of his film Damini over the delay in execution of the four perpetrators who were convicted in the Nirbhaya case due to loopholes in the laws.

Born into a Hindu family, he described the Kapoors and himself as secular.

== Illness and death ==
Kapoor was diagnosed with leukemia in 2018 and went to New York City for treatment. After successful treatment for a year, he returned to India on 26 September 2019.

However, he was admitted to Sir H. N. Reliance Foundation Hospital on 29 April 2020 due to breathing difficulties. He died on 30 April 2020 at 8:45 AM IST from recurrence of leukemia. Kapoor's last rites were performed at Chandanwadi Crematorium and his ashes were immersed in Banganga.

== Legacy and accolades ==
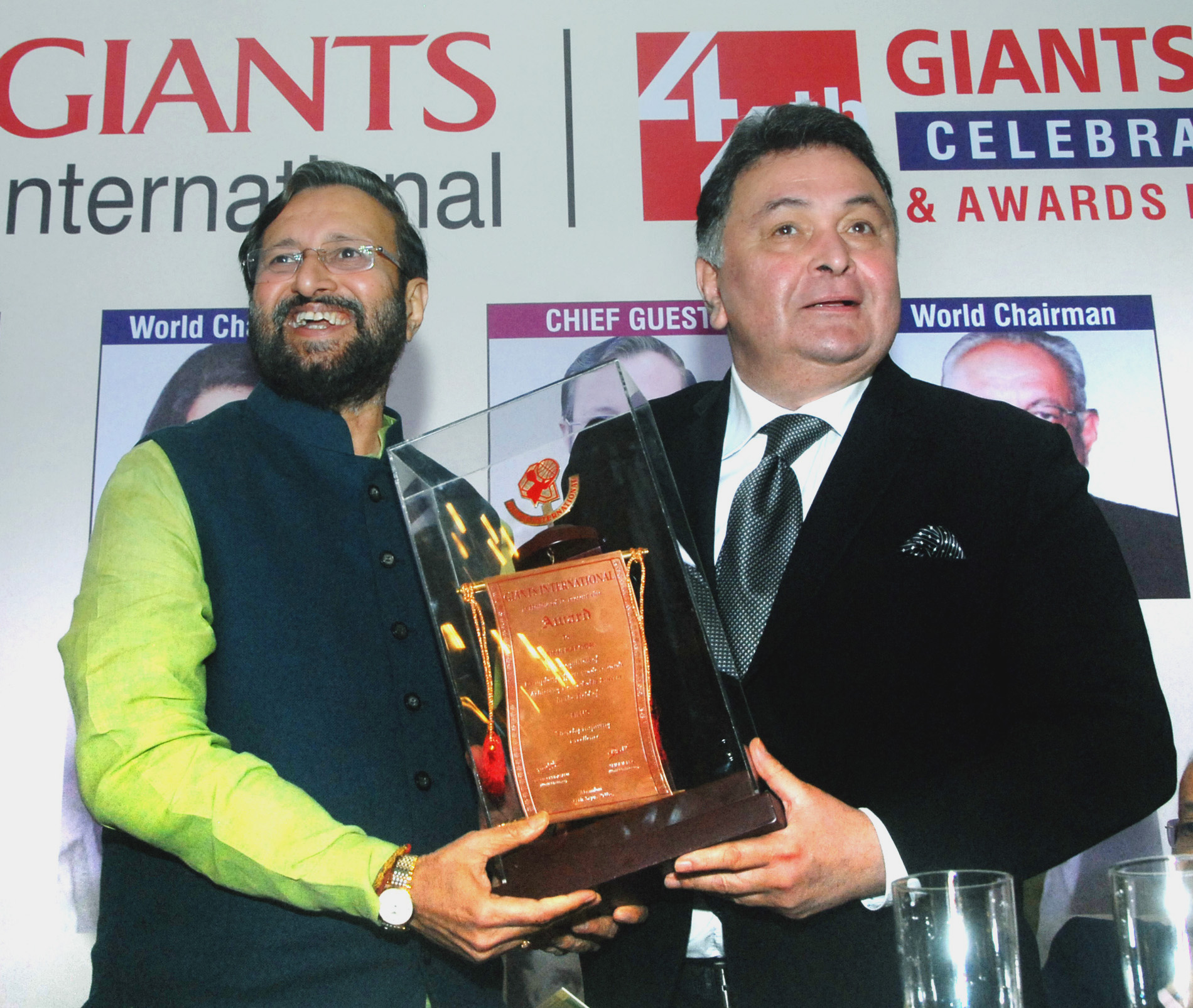
Kapoor being felicitated by Prakash Javadekar in New 2016.

Kapoor is one of the most recognizable actors of Hindi Cinema, he was a versatile actor who could effortlessly portray a wide range of characters. Kapoor's public persona and early career would come to be defined by his romantic films such as his super hit debut Bobby, Rafoo Chakkar, Sargam, Karz, Prem Rog, and Chandni. He was placed in Outlook India's "75 Best Bollywood Actors" list. One of the highest paid actors of late 1970s and in the 1980s, Kapoor appeared in Box office India's "Top Grossing Worldwide" and "Top Nett Grossing India" which were Agneepath, Housefull 2, Kapoor & Sons and Love Aaj Kal. He was also inducted into the Bollywood Walk of Fame at Bandra Bandstand, where his hand print was preserved.

- 1970 – National Film Award for Best Child Artist for Mera Naam Joker
- 1970 – Bengal Film Journalists' Association Awards: Special Award for Mera Naam Joker
- 1974 – Filmfare Award for Best Actor for Bobby
- 2008 – Filmfare Lifetime Achievement Award
- 2009 – Honoured by Russian Government for contribution to cinema
- 2010 – Producers Guild Film Award for Best Actor in a Supporting Role for Love Aaj Kal
- 2010 – Screen Award for Best Supporting Actor for Love Aaj Kal
- 2011 – Filmfare Award for Best Actor (Critics) for Do Dooni Chaar
- 2011 – Zee Cine Award for Best Lifetime Jodi along with Neetu Singh
- 2013 – The Times of India Film Awards (TOIFA) for Best Actor in a Negative Role for Agneepath
- 2017 – Filmfare Award for Best Supporting Actor for Kapoor & Sons
- 2017 – Zee Cine Award for Best Actor in a Supporting Role – Male for Kapoor & Sons
- 2017 – Zee Cine Award for Best Actor in a Comic Role for Kapoor & Sons
- 2019 – Adidas Most Stylish Awards – Best Projected By Adidas

== Bibliography ==
- Kapoor, Rishi; Iyer, Meena (2017). Khullam Khulla: Rishi Kapoor Uncensored. HarperCollins. ISBN 978-9352643028.

== See also ==
- List of Indian film actors
- List of Bollywood actors
