= Nizampur Gobari =

Coordinates: 25°48′N 83°02′E

Nizampur Gobari is a small village in Katghar Lalgnaj town in Azamgarh district in the Indian state of Uttar Pradesh.

The main occupation of the people in this village is agriculture. However, lack of roads and electricity have hampered the progress here.

The village was in news for its protest towards Loksabha elections held in 2009. To protest against the apathy of the administration and express their mistrust in politicians, the villagers put a banner displaying 'Road nahin to vote nahi' (No road no vote: We boycott this election) at the entry point of the village.
