= Udita Goswami =

Indian actress and model (born 1984)

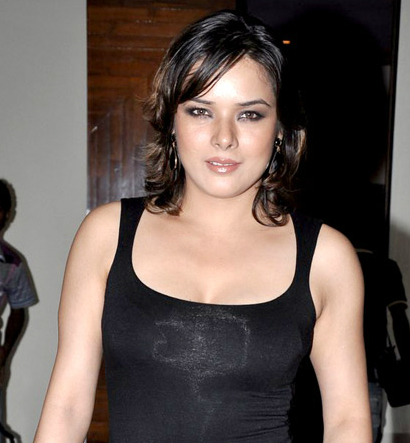
- Goswami in 2014
- Born: 9 February 1984 (age 42); Dehradun, Uttarakhand, India
- Occupations: Actress, model
- Years active: 2002–2012
- Spouse: Mohit Suri (m. 2013)
- Children: 2
- Relatives: Bhatt family

Udita Goswami (born 9 February 1984) is an Indian actress who worked in Hindi cinema. She dated and later married Hindi film director Mohit Suri.

== Personal life ==
Goswami was born in Dehradun. Her father is from Banaras and her mother is from Shillong. Goswami's grandmother is Nepalese. She completed her education in Dehradun where she studied at Cambrian Hall and D.A.V. Public school until class 9.

After a few years of dating, Goswami married Mohit Suri in 2013. They have two children, a daughter born in 2015 and a son born in 2018. She is the sister-in-law of actors Pooja Bhatt, Alia Bhatt and Emraan Hashmi.

== Career ==
Goswami started her career as a model and later began acting in Hindi films.

At 16, I walked the ramp in Dehradun for a fashion institute. After that, I shifted to Delhi to pursue my career in modelling, I sent some pictures which were taken at home to an MTV Model Mission contest. I was selected and won. Slowly, I started getting more assignments and did a lot of commercials. I became one of the top models in Delhi. I was the first one to appear on the cover of Elle magazine.

She worked as a model for brands like Pepsi, Titan Watches and debuted in Bollywood opposite John Abraham with Paap, which was also Pooja Bhatt's directorial debut. She later starred in Zeher opposite her brother-in-law Emraan Hashmi and Aksar opposite Dino Morea. She also appeared with Upen Patel in Ahmed Khan's music video for the remix of Kya Khoob Lagti Ho.

In 2012, she played the lead role in Diary of a Butterfly directed by Vinodh Mukhi which released to unfavorable reviews

== Filmography ==
Year	Film	Role	Other notes
2003	Paap	Kaaya	Nominated in Zee Cine Awards for Best Female Debut
2005	Zeher	Anna Verghese	
2006	Aksar	Sheena Roy Singh	
2006	Dil Diya Hai	Pannu	Special appearance
2007	Aggar	Jhanvi	
2009	Kisse Pyaar Karoon	Sheetal	
2009	Fox	Sophia	
2010	Chase	Nupur Chauhan	
2010	Apartment		Cameo appearance
2010	Rokkk	Ahana	
2012	Mere Dost Picture Abhi Baki Hai	Mohini	
2012	Diary of a Butterfly	Gul	
