= Chilsag Chillies Theatre Company =

Indian theatre company

- Formation: 9 March 2003
- Type: Theatre group
- Purpose: Media & entertainment
- Location: Mumbai, New Delhi, London, New Jersey
- Website: www.chilsag.com

Chilsag Chillies is an Indian theatre company and the production arm of the Chilsag Entertainment Network. The company has operations in US, UK, Canada and India. Founded in 2003 by Sachin Gupta.

== History ==
=== 2003-2010 ===
Founded in 2003 by Sachin Gupta. Late 2004, Chilsag laid the foundation of a new venture operationalising Corporate Theatre across its units. Theatre Pasta, an international theatre magazine was launched in 2005. Chilsag also stages two of its productions in locations across London in three days with its pack of English actors. Mid 2006, witnessed the initiation of Chilsag Children's Theatre Company and Theatre-in-Education projects. Chilsag Theatre Pasta International Awards successfully started its journey in beginning of 2007. The company staged the premier of its plays, 'A Rollercoaster Ride', 'Wake Up Call' and 'Kailashnath Weds Madhumati' at one of the performing arts locations in the capital city, New Delhi. Chilsag took its theatre production 'Celebration of Life', 'Handicapped City' to the international forum through shows Off-Broadway (New York City), Factory Theatre (Canada), locations across Boston, West Virginia and other cities. This year marked the launch of International Repertory for Chilsag with American actors. in 2009, Chilsag started its own Drama Therapy Centre. Late 2010, witnessed a collaboration with Indian Council for Cultural Relations and staged the play ' Wake Up Call'.

=== 2011-2019 ===
In 2011, Director Sachin Gupta received the Natya Bhushan, the highest ranking award for his contribution to Hindi theatre. 2015 also witnessed the conceptualisation and production of the biggest musical to be staged the capital city named, 'Chota Bheem The Musical' witnessed by over 18000 in the Siri Fort Auditorium. Recent tie up with London Players, UK for theatre and cinematic ventures. A new production ' Kafan' was also staged in 2017 with collaboration with the Indo -American Friendship Association and supported by the Ministry of Culture (India). The short film 'Pihu' which is based on the theatre production "Don't Miss My Party" was also released. Chilsag's Alumni includes film and television actors Huma Qureshi, Jitin Gulati, Deepak Wadhwa, Vasundhara Das, Gauri Karnik, Anjum Farooki, Nausheen Ali Sardar, Anuj Saxena, Prerna Wanvari, Kashmira Irani, Shraddha Musale, Rubina Dilaik and Neha Pawar.

== Notable Performances ==
Year	Title	Location	Director
2005	Three Days Chilsag Chillies Theatre Festival	New Delhi	Sachin Gupta
2006	Celebration of Life	Toronto	Sachin Gupta
2006	Live Telecast	Goa	Sachin Gupta
2009	Celebration of Life	New York City	Sachin Gupta
2009	Handicapped City	New York City	Sachin Gupta
2009	Kailashnath Weds Madhumati	New York City	Sachin Gupta
2009	Kailashnath Weds Madhumati	West Virginia	Sachin Gupta
2010	Wakeup Call	Bangalore	Sachin Gupta
2011	The Play Begins at 8pm.	Mumbai	Sachin Gupta

== Theatre productions ==
Year	Title	Genre
2003	Celebration of Life	Drama
2004	Handicapped City	Crime Drama
2005	Suicide is painless	Drama
2005	Live telecast	Satirical Drama
2005	Next Indian Idol	Comedy
2005	Great men at work	Comedy
2005	No Cheating Today	Comedy
2005	Devils Carnival	Musical
2005	Don't miss my party	Drama
2006	Kailashnath Weds Madhumati	Musical comedy
2007	Rollercoaster Ride	Fantasy
2007	Wake up Call	Drama
2010	The Play Begins at 8pm	Drama
2015	Chota Bheem The Musical	Musica

== Past Seasons ==
2007-2008

- At the Sriram Centre Auditorium: Wake Up Call, A Roller Coaster Ride,

2006-2007

- At the Sriram Centre Auditorium: Kailashnath Weds Madhumati

2005-2006

- At the LTG Auditorium: Suicide is Painless, Devil's Carnival, No Cheating Today, Live Telecast, Great Mind At Work', Don't Miss My Party, Next Indian Idol

2004-2005

- At the Sirifort Auditorium: Handicapped City

2003-2004

- At the Sriram Centre Auditorium: Celebration Of Life
