= Paranthe Wali Gali (film) =

- Theatrical release poster
- Directed by: Sachin Gupta
- Written by: Sachin Gupta
- Produced by: Sachin Gupta; Sushma Gupta; Subodh Goel
- Starring: Anuj Saxena; Neha Pawar
- Cinematography: Debasish Banerjee
- Edited by: Vinay R Chauhan
- Music by: Vasundhara Das; Vikram Khajuria
- Production company: Chilsag Entertainment Network
- Distributed by: Reliance
- Release date: 17 January 2014
- Running time: 105 Minutes
- Country: India
- Language: Hindi

Paranthe Wali Gali (transl. The alley of parathas) is a 2014 Indian romance comedy film directed and produced by award-winning playwright and theatre director Sachin Gupta under Chilsag-Civitech Motion Pictures. It is produced by Sachin Gupta and Sushma Gupta and co-produced by Subodh Goel and Alka Goel. The film stars Anuj Saxena and Neha Pawar in the lead roles.

== Cast ==
- Anuj Saxena as Maulik
- Neha Pawar as Naina Kaur
- Mohinder Gujral as Rimjhim Gaur
- Vijayant Kohli as Saluja
- Himanshu Thakkar as Danish
- Yuvraj Haral as Vivian
- Prabhakar Srinet as Farhaz
- Paropkar Singh as Jasmeet
- Jaspreet Kaur as Surili
- Ritika Jasmera as Tamanna

== Music ==
Paranthe Wali Gali

Soundtrack album by Vasundhara Das
- Released: 26 December 2013
- Genre: Feature film soundtrack
- Length: 28:09
- Language: Hindi
- Label: Times Music
External audio
- Audio Jukebox on YouTube

The music for the film was composed by Vasundhara Das and Vikram Khajuria and the background score by Vikram Khajuria with song lyrics by Vipin Mishra, Viraj Mishra and Devshi khanduri. The soundtrack album was released on 30 December 2013, with the following songs.

=== Track listing ===
No.	Title	Lyrics	Music	Singer(s)	Length
1.	"Paranthe Wali Gali"	Devshi Khanduri	Vikram Khajuria	Krishna Bhardwaj	5:28
2.	"Tere Bin Ho Na Sakega Gujara"	Devshi Khanduri	Vikram Khajuria	KK	5:20
3.	"Party Sharty"	Virag Mishra	Vasundhara Das	Jasraj Joshi	4:24
4.	"Wind Of Change"	Vasundhara Das & Vipin Mishra	Vasundhara Das	Siddharth Basrur, Joi Barua, Vasundhara Das & Prashant Vadiyar,	4:24
5.	"Khidki Se Zara Future Aane Do"	Virag Mishra	Vasundhara Das	Vasundhara Das	3:26
6.	"Dil Yeh Dhun Gaa Raha Hai"	Virag Mishra	Vasundhara Das	Tejas Shankar & Vasundhara Das	3:50
7.	"Subah Meri Subah Re"	Virag Mishra	Vasundhara Das	Vasundhara Das	4:49
Total length:					28:09
