= Sachin Gupta (director) =

Indian playwright, film director and actor

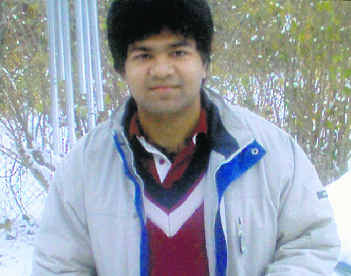
- Born: 9 March 1978 (age 48); Delhi, India
- Occupations: Director, producer. screenwriter
- Writing career
- Years active: 2002–present
- Website: sachingupta.net

Sachin Gupta (born 9 March 1978) is an Indian film producer, writer and director. He produces films under Chilsag Motion Pictures and is also an artistic director of Chilsag Chillies Theatre Company. He made his writing and directorial debut with the critically acclaimed film Paranthe Wali Gali (2014). He also shot to fame with Pakhi (2018). Gupta's sojourn into theatre started when he was 12 years old, and to date he has staged more than 100 shows around the world, working as an actor, director and playwright. His award-winning Off Broadway plays include Celebration of Life, Handicapped City, and Kailashnath weds Madhumati. He staged these in New York and in Toronto, Canada for which he got huge appreciation amongst theatre lovers in North America. Sachin Gupta was also the recipient of the Natya Bhushan award in 2012.

== Education ==
Sachin Gupta was born in New Delhi, India on 9 March 1978. He did his schooling at Summer Fields School, Kailash Colony New Delhi, and then attended Engineering College in Noida UP, India from where he received his bachelor's degree in computer engineering. Later he completed his MBA Degree from Symbiosis Pune. After this he went on to Stratford-upon-Avon in London to study and research William Shakespeare. This inspired him to then go to Fanshawe College in Canada to study theatre. While studying in Ontario he started the Canadian chapter of his theatre company, which immediately became a huge success. He went on to study management programs at Harvard University and studied acting at Lee Strasberg Theatre Institute, New York. He has also learned nuances of Shakespearean acting at the Emerson College in the US, and did a case study on Harvard University's American Repertory Theatre. Even while studying management programs, his end goal was theatre acting and filmmaking. He then used everything he learnt at Harvard to fuel his passion into the entertainment industry.

== Film career ==
Gupta made his writing and directorial debut with the critically acclaimed film Paranthe Wali Gali (2014), produced by Chilsag Motion Pictures, a production company he established in 2012.

Year	Title	Director(s)	Writer	Producer	Cast	Genre
2014	Paranthe Wali Gali	Yes	Yes	Yes	Anuj Saxena, Sushmita Sen, Neha Pawar	Drama
2015	Thoda Lutf Thoda Ishq	Yes	Yes	Yes	Hiten Tejwani, Neha Pawar, Rajpal Yadav, Sanjay Mishra, Bhavita Anand	Comedy
2018	Pakhi	Yes	Yes	Yes	Sumeet Kaul, Anamika Shukla, Pihu, Anmol Goswami	Crime drama
2019	Mansukh Chaturvedi ki Atmakatha	Yes	Yes	Yes	Sandeep Singh, Shalini Chauhan, Anamika Shukla, Sikandar Khan	Comedy
2020	Mango Talkies	Yes	Yes	Yes	Sanaya Irani, Sikandar Khan, Dau Dayal Bansal, Noyonita Lodh, Sunil Handa, Ravi Khanna, Susmita Mukherji, Vishal Choudhary, Sumeet Kant Kaul, Seema Pahwa, Shalini Chauhan, Priyanka Lulla, Sandeep Singh, Myra Hope, Tanya Sharma, Himanshu Sharma, Arjun Aujla, Arti Chaddha	Anthology series

== Theatre career ==
Sachin's sojourn into theatre started when he was 12 years old, and to date he has staged seventy-five shows around the world working as an actor, director and playwright. His award-winning Off Broadway plays include Celebration of Life, Handicapped City and Kailashnath weds Madhumati. He staged these in New York and in Toronto, Canada for which he got huge appreciation amongst theatre lovers in North America. His acting career started in his school days where he starred in and produced plays. This continued in college as well, as he slowly developed a passion for theatre and performing arts.

In December 2002 he started his Chilsag Chillies Theatre Company, which has produced thirteen original theatre productions written and directed by him addressing various social issues. He has trained more than 300 actors in various acting programs under the acting school he began in 2004. The company's very first production, Celebration of Life, was felicitated by the chief minister of Delhi, Sheila Dikshit, and was also appreciated internationally when it was performed at the Factory Theatre, Toronto, Canada and Off-Broadway Theare, New York. Chilsag tied up with the Actor's Experimental Lab in the United States and established Salgane School of Acting in 2003. In 2004, Chilsag Chillies received letters of appreciation from Dr. APJ Abdul Kalam (former President of India), Shivraj Patil (former Home Minister, India) and the Italian cultural centre and Department of Art and Culture, Government of India for the contribution to theatre. In late 2004, Chilsag laid the foundation of a new venture operationalising corporate theatre across its units. Theatre Pasta, an international theatre magazine, was launched in 2005. Chilsag also stages two of its productions in locations across London in three days with its pack of English actors.

In 2005, Gupta conducted the Three Days Chilsag Chillies Theatre Festival, where he directed eight plays including four full-length plays over three days. Mid-2006 witnessed the initiation of Chilsag Children's Theatre Company and Theatre-in-Education projects. Chilsag Theatre Pasta International Awards successfully started its journey in beginning of 2007. The company staged the premier of its plays A Rollercoaster Ride, Wake Up Call, and Kailashnath Weds Madhumati at one of the premier performing arts location in the capital city, New Delhi. Chilsag took its theatre productions Celebration of Life and Handicapped City to the international forum through shows Off-Broadway (New York City), Factory Theatre (Canada), locations across Boston, West Virginia, and other cities. This year marked the launch of International Repertory for Chilsag with American actors.

In 2009, Chilsag started its own Drama Therapy Centre. Late 2010 witnessed a collaboration with Indian Council for Cultural Relations and production of the play Wake Up Call. In 2011, director Sachin Gupta received the Natya Bhushan, the highest ranking award for his contribution to Hindi theatre. 2015 also witnessed the conceptualisation and production of the biggest musical to be staged in the capital city, Chota Bheem The Musical, which was attended by over 18,000 in the Siri Fort Auditorium. In 2016, Chilsag signed a six-film deal with United States-based production house for the production of meaningful cinema and short films. A new production, Kafan, was also staged in 2017 with collaboration with the Indo-American Friendship Association and supported by the Ministry of Culture.

Internationally, he marked his debut in 2005 as he moved to North America to expand his film and theatre work. Since then he has performed the world over, including major cities like New York, Toronto, London, Birmingham, Boston, Philadelphia, Mumbai, New Delhi, Kolkata, Ontario, Orissa, Bangalore, and Goa. He has been invited to perform at some of the most prestigious international festivals. In 2011 he staged his theatre production The Play Begins @8pm in Orissa while working as an actor along with film actor and playback singer Vasundhara Das.

Film and television actors who have worked with Gupta's theatre company include Huma Qureshi, Jitin Gulati, Deepak Wadhwa, Vasundhara Das, Gauri Karnik, Anjum Farooki, Nausheen Ali Sardar, Anuj Saxena, Prerna Wanvari, Kashmira Irani, Shraddha Musale, Rubina Dilaik and Neha Pawar.

He also acted in the play Kailash Nath Weds Madhumati, an Off Broadway musical comedy production in New York in 2009.

Plays written and directed by Sachin Gupta
Year	Title	Directed	Produced	Written	Genre
2003	Celebration of Life	Yes	Yes	Yes	Drama
2004	Handicapped City	Yes	Yes	Yes	Crime drama
2005	Suicide is painless	Yes	Yes	Yes	Drama
2005	Live telecast	Yes	Yes	Yes	Satirical drama
2005	Next Indian Idol	Yes	Yes	Yes	Comedy
2005	Great men at work	Yes	Yes	Yes	Comedy
2005	No Cheating Today	Yes	Yes	Yes	Comedy
2005	Devils Carnival	Yes	Yes	Yes	Musical
2005	Don't miss my party	Yes	Yes	Yes	Drama
2006	Kailashnath Weds Madhumati	Yes	Yes	Yes	Musical comedy
2007	Rollercoaster Ride	Yes	Yes	Yes	Fantasy
2007	Wake up Call	Yes	Yes	Yes	Drama
2008	Uncle Vanya	Yes	Yes	No	Comedy
2008	The Odd Couple	Yes	Yes	No	Comedy
2008	A Midsummer Night's Dream	Yes	Yes	No	Fantasy fiction
2009	The Cherry Orchard	Yes	Yes	No	Drama
2009	A Doll's House	Yes	Yes	No	Realistic drama
2009	Hedda Gabler	Yes	Yes	No	
2009	The Glass Menagerie	Yes	Yes	No	Memory play
2010	The Play Begins at 8pm	Yes	Yes	Yes	Drama
2014	All My Sons	Yes	Yes	No	Tragedy
2015	Chota Bheem The Musical	Yes	Yes	Yes	Musical
2016	Ek Shaam Amrita Ke Naam	Yes	Yes	No	
2016	Kafan	Yes	Yes	No	Satirical

== Short films ==
Year	Title	Director	Cast	Genre
2017	Bidaai	Sachin Gupta	Sikandar Khan, Dau Dayal Bansal	Crime
2017	My Daughter	Sachin Gupta	Noyonita Lodh, Sunil Handa, Ravi Khanna	Drama
2017	The Beginning	Sachin Gupta	Susmita Mukherji, Dau Dayal Bansal, Vishal Choudhary	Drama
2018	Pihu	Sachin Gupta	Sumeet Kant Kaul, Dau Dayal Bansal, Sanaya Irani	Romance
2020	ManoharJi Ki Nimmi	Sachin Gupta	Seema Pahwa, Shalini Chauhan, Sikandar Khan, Priyanka Lulla, Sandeep Singh, Dau Dayal Bansal	Comedy
2020	Seerat	Sachin Gupta	Myra Hope, Tanya Sharma, Himanshu Sharma, Arjun Aujla, Arti Chaddha,	Crime

== Music videos ==
Year	Title	Director	Music	Singer	Cast
2019	"Naino Tale"	Yes	Shivang Mathur	Shivang Mathur, Asees Kaur	Jannat Zubair Rahmani, Manish Tyagi
2019	"Itni Si Kahani"	Yes	Shivang Mathur	Asees Kaur, Abhijeet S, Shivang M.	Rohan Mehra, Deepti Sati
2020	"Pehla Janam"	Yes	Shivang Mathur	Shivang Mathur, Prateeksha Srivastava	Lyricist - Shayra Apoorva Programming, Mix & Master - Aman Agarwal
2020	"Chunariya"	Yes	Shivang Mathur	Prateeksha Srivastava, Shivang Mathur	Lyricist - Shayra Apoorva Music Produced, Mix and Mastered by Rishit Chauhan @ Beatspace Studios, Music Assistant - Chirag Chopra
2020	"Haneya"	Yes	Shivang Mathur	Kalpana Gandharv	Lyricist - Shayra Apoorva Arranged & Produced By Rishit Chauhan, Mix By Rishit Chauhan, Mastered By Adil Nadaf And Rishit Chauhan, Strokes - Piyush Sood, Flute - Deepak, Music Assistant - Chirag Chopra
