= Pakhi (film) =

- Directed by: Sachin Gupta
- Screenplay by: Sachin Gupta
- Produced by: Sushma Gupta and Rashmi Bansal.
- Starring: Sumeet Kaul, Anamika Shukla, Anmol Goswami and Pihu Datta
- Music by: Shivang Mathur
- Production company: Chilsag Entertainment Network
- Release date: September 2018
- Running time: 100 minutes
- Country: India
- Language: Hindi

Pakhi (transl. bird) is a 2018 Indian crime drama directed and produced by the award-winning playwright and theatre director Sachin Gupta under Chilsag Entertainment Network in association with London Players. It is produced by Sachin Gupta, Sushma Gupta and Rashmi Bansal. The film stars Sumeet Kaul, Anamika Shukla, Anmol Goswami and Pihu Datta in the lead roles. The film is based on a true story of a 10-year-old girl with focuses on child trafficking, flesh trade, child marriage, and rape.

== Plot ==
The narrative begins with Suhani; a young girl conned into the flesh trade operated by a goon called Bali. Circumstances make the brutal Bali believe that Suhani brings him luck, so he gives her royal treatment compared to the other girls in his faction. Several months later, Pihu, her brother Maulik, and her elder sister are sold to Bali by their uncle. While the elder sister escapes the trauma by killing herself, Pihu catches the eye of a Hyderabad businessman who is keen to marry her. Later, Suhani helps Pihu and her brother escape from Bali's clutches, which forms the crux of the tale. Run time is 100 minutes.

== Cast ==
- Sumeet Kant Kaul as Bali
- Anamika Shukla as Pakhi
- Anmol Goswami as Maulik
- Sikandar Khan
- Tanmanya Bali
- Vijyant Kohli
- Komal Khanna
- Gital Patel

== Music ==
The music for the film was composed by Shivang Mathur. The background score was composed by Nikhil Koparde. The lyrics were written by Shayra Apoorva.

=== Track listing ===
| No. | Title | Lyrics | Music | Singer | Length | Produced | Mastered |
|---|---|---|---|---|---|---|---|
| 1. | Andhere | Shayra Apoorva | Shivang Mathur | Prateeksha Srivastava | 3:54 | Aman Agarwal | Aman Agarwal |
| 2. | Khabrein Garam | Shayra Apoorva | Shivang Mathur | Tanisha Datta | 3:52 | Rishit Chauhan | Atharva Joshi |
| 3. | Gum Hain Kahan | Shayra Apoorva | Shivang Mathur | Prateeksha Srivastava | 7:58 | Aman Agarwal | Aman Agarwal |
| 4. | Gum Hain Kahan (Duet) | Shayra Apoorva | Shivang Mathur | Aditti Mehrotra & Prateeksha Srivastava | 13:22 | Aman Agarwal | Aman Agarwal |

== Censorship ==
The movie faced hard criticism from the Central Board of Film Certification for their item song. The movie was considered too dark and serious as it tackled the concept of sex trafficking. The film received an 'A' certificate from the Central Board of Film Certification because it was said to be very intense. They were also asked to remove the item song, 'Khabare hot', to replace the word 'Kali' wherever 'Kali Puja' is used and to replace 'Ministerji' with 'Netaji' The director started a movement with the hashtag #JusticeforPakhi to get the movie approved by CBFC without any cuts. The movie was supposed to release on 10 August 2018 but was finally released in September 2018 after all the necessary cuts were made.
