= Mansukh Chaturvedi ki Atmakatha =

Indian Comedy Film

- Directed by: Sachin Gupta
- Produced by: Sachin Gupta, Sushma Gupta
- Starring: Sikander Khan, Sandeep Singh, Monika
- Cinematography: Naveen Kumar I, Anubhab Kabir
- Music by: Shivang Mathur
- Production company: Chilsag Entertainment Network
- Release date: 26 January 2019
- Running time: 92 minutes
- Country: India
- Language: Hindi

Mansukh Chaturvedi ki Atmakatha (transi: Autobiography of Mansukh Chaturvedi) is a 2019 Indian Comedy film directed and produced by Sachin Gupta under Chilsag Entertainment Network. It is produced by Sachin Gupta and Sushma Gupta. The film stars Sandeep Singh, Sikander Khan and Monika in the lead roles.

== Plot ==
Mansukh the protagonist is from Etawah. He rules the hearts of his neighbours and is a heartthrob of his city with his head in the clouds. He dreams of being a big superstar in Mumbai, despite his father's concerns and his girlfriend, Munia's constant attempts to bring his head out of the clouds. However, for Mansukh, dreaming about being the 'Raving Hollywood star-Mansukh' is not new to his unreal world. The story revolves around a small town boy's dreams to be the superstar of the silver screen and the star of all hearts and the struggle of Mansukh's father with the help of Munia's efforts to make Mansukh realise the reality of the path he is on. In this comic trail of events we see what path Mansukh chooses for himself.

The film is based on a play called 'Dear Madhav' and was released all India.

== Cast ==
- Sandeep Singh as Mansukh Chaturvedi
- Anamika Shukla as Buaji
- Monika as Muniya
- Sikander Khan as Mansukh's father
- Vishal as casting guy
- Anushka as actor 1
- Desiree as actor 2
- Megha as Mansukh's mother
- Subrato as Paanwala

== Music ==
The music for the film was composed by Shivang Mathur along with lyricist Shayra Apoorva.

Track Listing
No.	Title	Lyrics	Singer	Music	Duration
1.	Rehna Tum	Sharya Apoorva	Shivang Mathur	Rishit Chauhan, Adil Nadaf, Prateeksha Srivastava, Deepak Saadhu, Shivang Mathur	3:34
2.	Rehna Tum Reprise	Shayra Apoorva	Asees Kaur & Shivang Mathur	Rishit Chauhan, Adil Nadaf, Parishkrit Pant	3:25
3.	Thain Thain	Shayra Apoorva	Shahid Mallya	Shivang Mathur, Rishit Chauhan, Prithvi Sharma, Chirag Chopra, Saurabh Sharma	3:00
4.	Zikra	Sumeet Tyagi	Mukesh Gupta	Shivang Mathur, Rishit Chauhan, Rishit Chauhan, Adil Nadaf	3:10
5.	Bhaiya Ji Ka Bhaukal	Shayra Apoorva	Prem Nikaju	Rishit Chauhan, Rishit Chauhan, Chirag Chopra & Shivang Mathur	2:17
