= Kucchh Pal Saath Tumhara =

- Genre: Drama
- Starring: see below
- Opening theme: "Kucchh Pal Saath Tumhara" by
- Country of origin: India
- Original language: Hindi
- No. of seasons: 1

Production
- Executive producer: Shammi Aunty
- Producer: Asha Parekh
- Running time: 24 minutes

Original release
- Network: Sahara One
- Release: 27 June 2003 – 2004

Kucchh Pal Saath Tumhara is an Indian television series that aired on Sahara One channel in 2003 and 2004. The series is produced by the popular Bollywood golden era actress, Asha Parekh. The series premiered on 27 June 2003, with the story of Nandini - a traditional Indian woman who stays is torn between tradition and forbidden love.

== Overview ==
The story portrays the life a young woman name Nandini and her hardships of life. Nandini who stays within the parameters of traditional values reaches a stage in her life when she is torn between two men who love her and wish to marry her at different phases of her life. It traces Nandini’s evolution from a weak and submissive woman to a strong woman who questions the norms of society at the crossroads of her life.

== Cast ==
- Sushmita Daan as Nandini Sameer Singh Rana
- Anuj Saxena / Akhil Ghai as Amit
- Joy Sengupta as Sameer Singh Rana
- Manasi Salvi
- Anuj Mathur
- Rajiv Menon
- Rajeev Verma as Samresh Singh Rana
- S. M. Zaheer
- Amita Nangia
- Uttara Baokar
