= Neha Pawar =

Indian actress

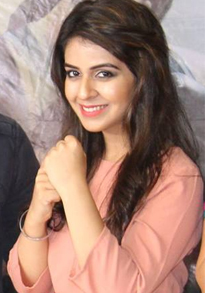
- Neha in 2017
- Born: Delhi, India
- Occupation: Actress

Neha Pawar is an Indian actress who predominantly appears in Bollywood films. She has also appeared in Punjabi films. She is known for her films Paranthe Wali Gali (2014) and Thoda Lutf Thoda Ishq (2015). She is going to appear as main lead actress in the Punjabi movie Kirdar-E-Sardar. She played leading role in Asees.

== Filmography ==
Year	Title	Role	Notes
2014	Paranthe Wali Gali	Naina Kaur	Hindi film
2015	Thoda Lutf Thoda Ishq	Mini	Hindi film
2017	Kirdar-E-Sardar		Punjabi film
2018	Asees	Resham	Punjabi film
2019	Amaanat	Sharan	Punjabi film
2021	Life Cab		Hindi film
2022	CAT	Young Madam Aulakh	Netflix Show
2023	Chidiyan Da Chamba	Shivi	Punjabi film
2026	Dhurandhar: The Revenge	Black Site Agent / Chemistry Teacher	Hindi film
