= Theatre Pasta =

Indian theatre magazine

- Editor: Sachin Gupta
- Categories: Theatre
- Frequency: Monthly
- First issue: 9 March 2005
- Company: Chilsag Chillies
- Country: India
- Based in: New Delhi, India
- Language: English
- Website: Official website

Theatre Pasta is an Indian theatre magazine launched in 2005 and published by Chilsag Chillies Theatre Company, with playwright and director Sachin Gupta as its editor.

Since 2007 it has presented annually the Theatre Pasta Theatre Awards, in association with Chilsag International and the Actor's Experimental Laboratory, U.S.

== History ==
Theatre Pasta Theatre Awards

Theatre Pasta was founded on 9 March 2005, by Sachin Gupta, playwright/theatre director and the founder-director of Chilsag Chillies Theatre Company.

== See also ==
- Madeeha Gauhar
