= Anuj Saxena =

Indian television actor (born 1967)

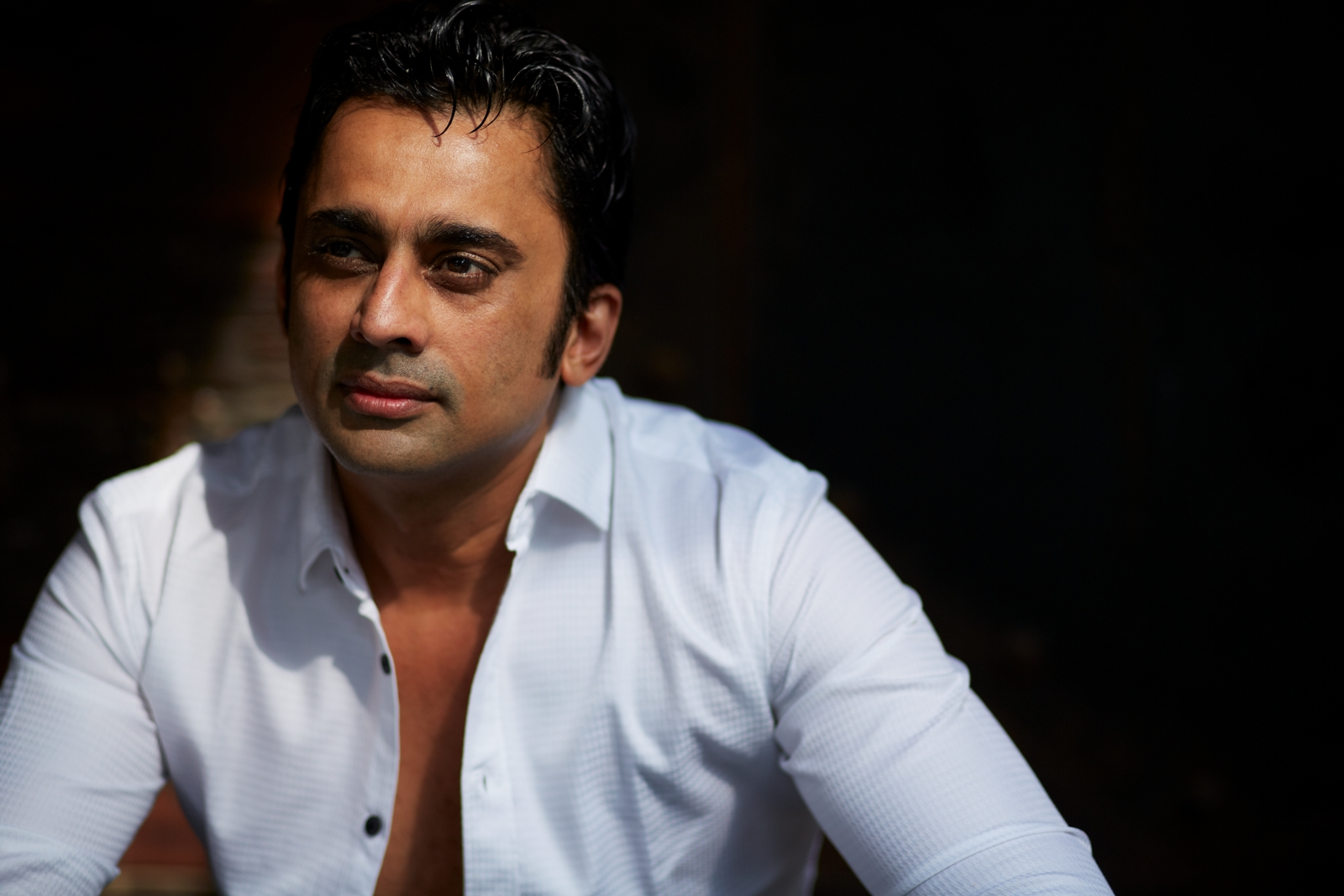
- Born: 31 July 1967 (age 58); New Delhi, India
- Occupations: Actor, Film producer, Businessman, Doctor
- Years active: 1993–2014
- Known for: Kkusum; Kumkum – Ek Pyara Sa Bandhan; Saara Akaash; Prratima; Risshton Ki Dor
- Spouse: Ishmit Dhadial (m. 2004; div. 2005)
- Partners: Narayani Shastri (2002–2003); Juhi Parmar (2005–2007)
- Parents: Jagdish Saxena (father); Sneh Saxena (mother)
- Relatives: Alok Saxena (brother); Shalini Saxena (sister)

Dr. Anuj Saxena (born 31 July 1967) is an Indian actor, film producer and businessman.

Saxena made his acting debut in 1993 in the comedy TV series Dekh Bhai Dekh. He became famous for his role of Abhay Kapoor in Sony Entertainment Television's serial Kkusum and has appeared in sixteen TV serials including Kshitij, Karm and Aasmaan Se Aagay. His first film appearance was in Chase in 2010. In 2005, he launched his own production house, Maverick Productions.

He married Ishmit Dhadial in 2004, but the couple divorced a year later in 2005.

Saxena is also the COO of pharmaceutical company Elder Pharmaceuticals, and was involved in a cheque bounce and fraud case related to the company. A bureaucrat, B.K. Bansal, investigating Elder Pharma fraud committed suicide in September 2016. The company had tried to bribe him earlier. Saxena is wanted by investigating agency CBI in the case, and a non-bailable warrant was issued by court for him in October 2016.

== Television ==
| Year | Serial | Role | Channel | Notes | Co–Star |
|---|---|---|---|---|---|
| | Kshitij | | | | |
| 1993 | Dekh Bhai Dekh | Tiwari | DD Metro | Episodic Role | |
| 1994–1995 | Aasmaan Se Aagay | Karan Vidyut | DD National | Lead Role | |
| 1996 | Karm | Shiv Dhawan | Zee TV | Lead Role | |
| 1998 | Kora Kagaz | Dr. Deepak | Star Plus | Supporting Role | |
| 2001–2002; 2003–2005 | Kkusum | Abhay Kapoor | Sony Entertainment Television | Lead Role | Nausheen Ali Sardar; Shweta Kawatra; Narayani Shastri; Poonam Narula; Manasi Joshi Roy; Shilpa Saklani |
| 2002 | Kumkum – Ek Pyara Sa Bandhan | Jatin Wadhwa | Star Plus | Supporting Role | Juhi Parmar |
| 2005–2006 | Kumkum – Ek Pyara Sa Bandhan | Manik | Star Plus | Negative Role | Dimple Inamdar |
| 2003 | Kucchh Pal Saath Tumhara | Amit | Sahara One | Lead Role | Sushmita Daan |
| 2003–2004 | Saara Akaash | Flight Lieutenant Karan Singh Rathore / ISI Agent Falaq | Star Plus | Negative Role | Sai Deodhar |
| 2004–2005 | Prratima | Amol Roy | Sahara One | Lead Role | Jyoti Mukherjee; Dimple Inamdar |
| 2006 | Solhah Singaarr | Kumarvardhan Bharadwaj | Sahara One | Cameo Role | Mrinal Kulkarni; Rajeshwari Sachdev |
| 2006–2007 | Risshton Ki Dor | Suhas Abhayankar | Sony Entertainment Television | Lead Role | Urvashi Dholakia; Moonmoon Banerjee |
| 2007 | Babul Ki Bitiya Chali Doli Saja Ke | Vikram Kapoor | Sahara One | Supporting Role | Surbhi Tiwari; Jaya Mathur |
| 2008 | Kuchh Is Tara | Abhay Kapoor (Episode 51) | Sony Entertainment Television | Episodic Role | Nausheen Ali Sardar |
| 2012 | Pyaar Ya Dehshat | Host | Big Magic | Crime Show | Nausheen Ali Sardar |
| 2013 | Devyani | Advocate Anuj Daftardari | Star Pravah | Supporting Role | |

== Filmography ==
| Year | Film | Role | Notes | Co–Star |
|---|---|---|---|---|
| 1999 | Sar Ankhon Par | Jay | Lead Role | Shruti Panwar |
| 2010 | Chase | Sohail Ansari | Lead Role | Udita Goswami |
| 2014 | Paranthe Wali Gali | Maulik | Lead Role | Neha Pawar |

=== Music video ===
| Year | Music Video | Role | Co–Star |
|---|---|---|---|
| 2001 | Ikraar | Abhay Kapoor | Nausheen Ali Sardar |

== Producer ==
=== Television ===
| Year | Serial | Channel |
|---|---|---|
| 2006–2007 | Kulvaddhu | Sony Entertainment Television |
| 2008–2009 | Sach Hue Sapne Mere | |
| 2012–2014 | Devyani | Star Pravah |

=== Films ===
| Year | Film | Notes |
|---|---|---|
| 2009 | Aloo Chaat | |
| 2009 | House Full | Kannada film |
| 2010 | Chase | |
| 2010 | Dharmachakari | Gujarati film |
| 2011 | Miley Naa Miley Hum | |

== Executive Producer ==
| Year | Documentary |
|---|---|
| 2011 | Fables Of Birth |
