= Handicapped City =

Theatre production by Sachin Gupta

Handicapped City is an off-Broadway Theatre production written and directed by Indian playwright Sachin Gupta.

== Plot ==
Ruby, the leader of a group of young partygoers, finds out a way to get financial support to take care of disabled people. Except they are not planning to actually take care of them.

== Characters ==
- Ruby
- Jamie
- Johny
- Nicole
- Tracy
- Trista
- Madeline

== Off Broadway cast ==
Character	Cast
Ruby	Clara Campi
Jamie	Eric Gonzalez
Johnny	Chris Callaway
Nicole	Alissa Schroeter
Tracy	Krystina Bisante
Trista	Jessica Goldstain
Madeline	Fran Huber

== Duration ==
65 Minutes

== Past seasons ==
2004-2005

- At the Sirifort Auditorium
- At the LTG Auditorium

2006-2007

- At Shri Ram Centre for Performing Arts Auditorium India

2008-2009

- At Soho Playhouse, New York City
