= Thoda Lutf Thoda Ishq =

2015 Indian film

- Film poster
- Directed by: Sachin Gupta
- Written by: Sachin Gupta
- Produced by: Bharat Bansal; Vivek Yadav; Sachin Gupta
- Starring: Hiten Tejwani; Rajpal Yadav; Sanjay Misra; Neha Pawar; Bhavita Anand; Rakesh Bedi
- Cinematography: Debasish Banerjee
- Edited by: Vinay Chauhan
- Music by: Vikram Khajuria
- Release date: 10 July 2015
- Running time: 1 hour 37 minutes
- Country: India
- Language: Hindi

Thoda Lutf Thoda Ishq (transl. A little fun, a little love is a 2015 Hindi-language comedy drama film directed and produced by Sachin Gupta and co-produced by Bharat Bansal and Vivek Yadav under the banner of Chilsag Motion Pictures. The film stars Hiten Tejwani, Rajpal Yadav, Sanjay Mishra, Rakesh Bedi, Neha Pawar, Bhavita Anand.

== Cast ==
- Hiten Tejwani as Jhumroo
- Rajpal Yadav as Ghungroo
- Sanjay Mishra as Neta Ji
- Rakesh Bedi as The Boss
- Neha Pawar as Mini
- Sushmita Mukherjee as Jhumru's mother
- Bhavita Anand as Chuski
- Sanjana Singh as item number

== Production ==
This movie was shot in Delhi NCR, Etawah, Meerut & Saifai.

== Release ==
Trailer was released on 23 June 2015 by then Chief Minister Akhilesh Yadav at Saifai Mahotsav. The movie was released in India on 10 July 2015.

== Music ==
Thoda Lutf Thoda Ishq: Original Motion Picture Soundtrack

Soundtrack album to Thoda Lutf Thoda Ishq by Vikram Khajuria
- Released: 10 June 2015
- Genre: Feature film soundtrack
- Length: 18:54
- Language: Hindi
- Label: Zee Music Company

The soundtrack album and background score were composed by Vikram Khajuria.

Thoda Lutf Thoda Ishq (Original Motion Picture Soundtrack)
No.	Title	Lyrics	Singer(s)	Length
1.	"Mera Pyaar Hai Maggi Jaisa"	Devshi Khanduri	Mamta Sharma	03:58
2.	"Pyaar Hua Jab Tujhsey"	Devshi Khanduri	Mohammed Irfan	05:11
3.	"Bawri Booch Pool Party"	Devshi Khanduri	Raja Sagoo	03:54
4.	"Thoda Lutf Thoda Ishq"	Devshi Khanduri	Labh Janjua	04:23
5.	"Pyaar Hua Jab Tujhsey"	Devshi Khanduri	Palak Muchhal	02:38
