= B. K. Bansal =

Indian government official

B.K.Bansal

Director-General of Corporate Affairs in Union Government

BK Bansal also Bal Kishan Bansal (born 1953) was Director-General of Corporate Affairs in Union Government. He died on 27 September 2016, after accusing 3 CBI officers of torture in his suicide note. His 25-year-old son Yogesh Bansal also killed himself on the same day at their residence in Neelkanth Apartments in East Delhi.

== Arrest in Bribery ==
BK Bansal was arrested on alleged charges of accepting bribe of Rs 9 lakh. He was accused of attempt to scuttle a probe against a Mumbai-based pharmaceutical company. Bansal's wife Satyabala, aged 58, daughter Neha, aged 28, committed suicide on 19 July 2016, after Bansal was sent to CBI custody. A special CBI court had later granted him bail in August.

== See also ==
- Ashok Khemka
