= Celebration of Life =

2003 play by Sachin Gupta

- Original language: English
- Written by: Sachin Gupta
- Characters: Vanessa, Whitney, Brandon, Sophia, Julia, Michael

Premiere
- Official website

Celebration of Life is a one-hour English play written and directed by Sachin Gupta.

== Characters ==
Vanessa, Whitney, Brandon, Sophia, Julia, Michael.

== Off-Broadway cast ==
- Vanessa: Claire Duncan
- Whitney: Clara Campi
- Brandon: Erick Gonzales
- Sophia: Krystina Bisante
- Julia: Sima Stuve
- Michael: Rocco D'Elia.

== Past seasons ==
- 2003–2004 — Sriram Centre Auditorium
- 2005–2006 — LTG Auditorium
- 2006–2007 — Factory Theatre, Canada
- 2006–2007 — Sriram Centre Auditorium, India
- 2007–2008 — Sriram Centre Auditorium
- 2008–2009 — Soho Playhouse
