= Gali Paranthe Wali =

Street in Delhi

Coordinates: 28°39′21″N 77°13′47″E

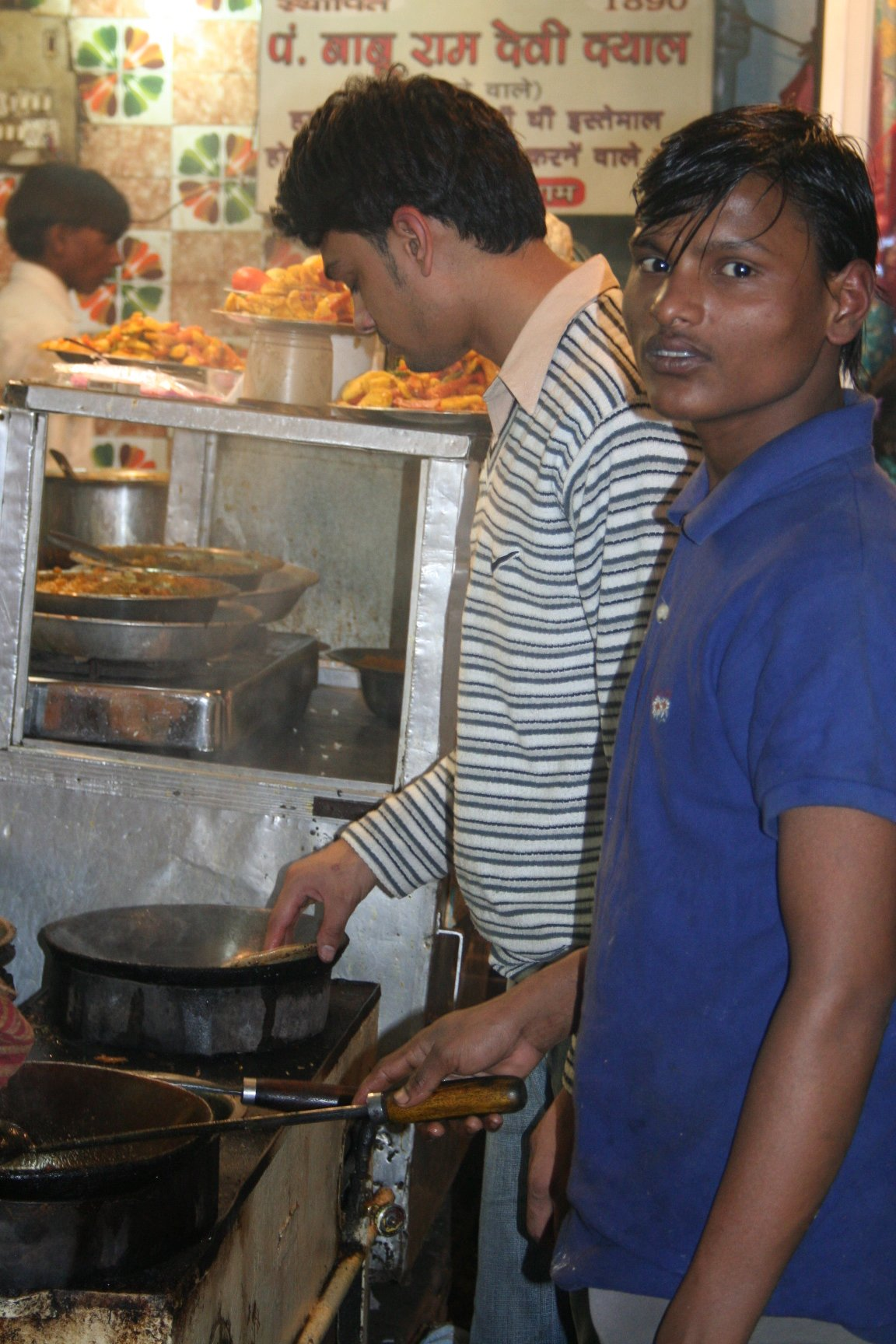
Gali Parathi Wali in Chandni Chowk is known for its parathas, December 2006.

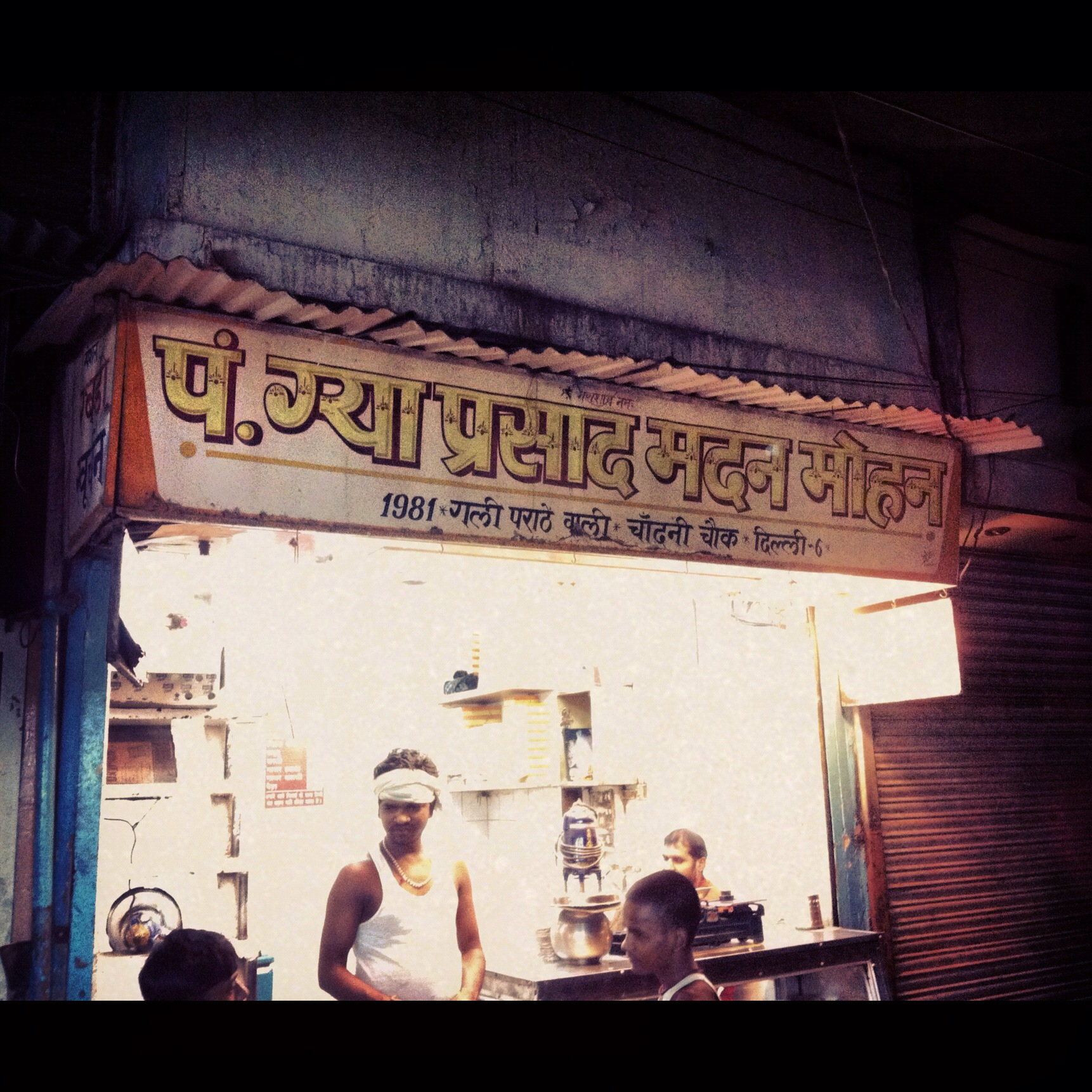
A paratha stall in Parathe wali gali

Gali Paranthe Wali or Paranthe wali Gali (Hindi: गली पराँठेवाली, literally "the bylane of flatbread") is a narrow street in the Chandni Chowk area of Old Delhi, noted for its series of shops selling paratha, an Indian flatbread.

== History ==
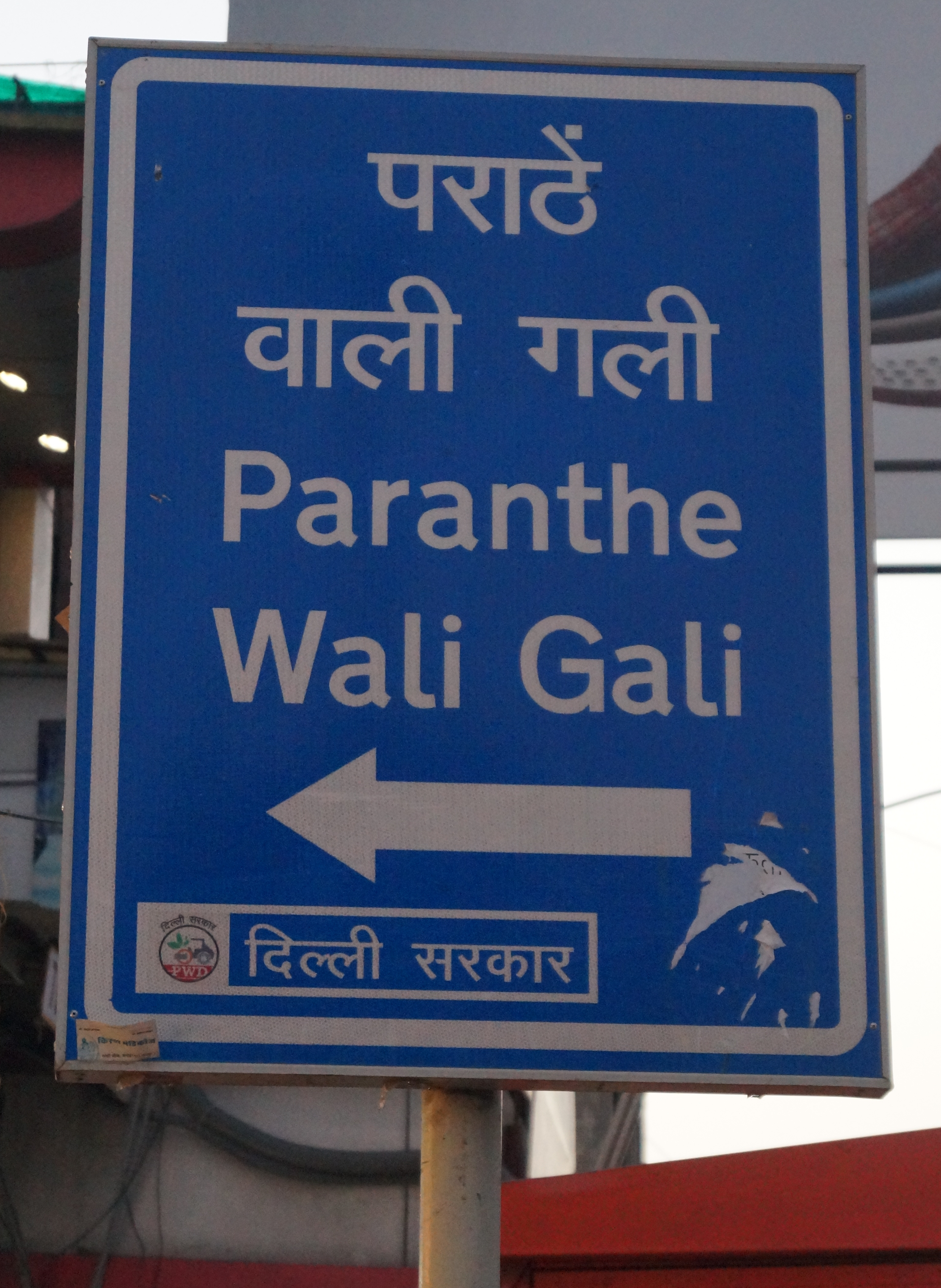
Sign board from Chandni Chowk

Gali Paranthe Wali is located in Chandni Chowk, which was established in 1650 during the reign of the Mughal Emperor, Shah Jahan, and designed by his daughter, Jahanara Begum. Previously, this lane was known only for its silverware shops, before the Parantha shops moved in, starting in the 1870s, though many sari and jewellery shops remain.

Of the 20 parantha shops in the late 1960s (all belonging to branches of the same family), three remain: Pt Kanhaiyalal Durgaprasad Dixit (established 1875), Pt Dayanand Shivcharan (established 1882). Pt Baburam Devidayal Paranthewale (established 1886). By 1911, this area, known as Chota Dariba or Dariba Kalan, got the name Paranthewali Gali. In the years just after independence, Jawaharlal Nehru, Indira Gandhi, and Vijaya Lakshmi Pandit came to take their parantha meals in this gali. In the late 1980s many of them closed shop and moved out, though today the street is experiencing a revival and some shops are being run by the sixth generation of the same family.

Bollywood actor Akshay Kumar used to live in the area. Flight lieutenant Tapan Kapoor of the Indian Air Force who martyred in a rescue operation at Uttarakhand on 25 June 2013 was also a resident of Paranthe Wali Galli.

== Food ==
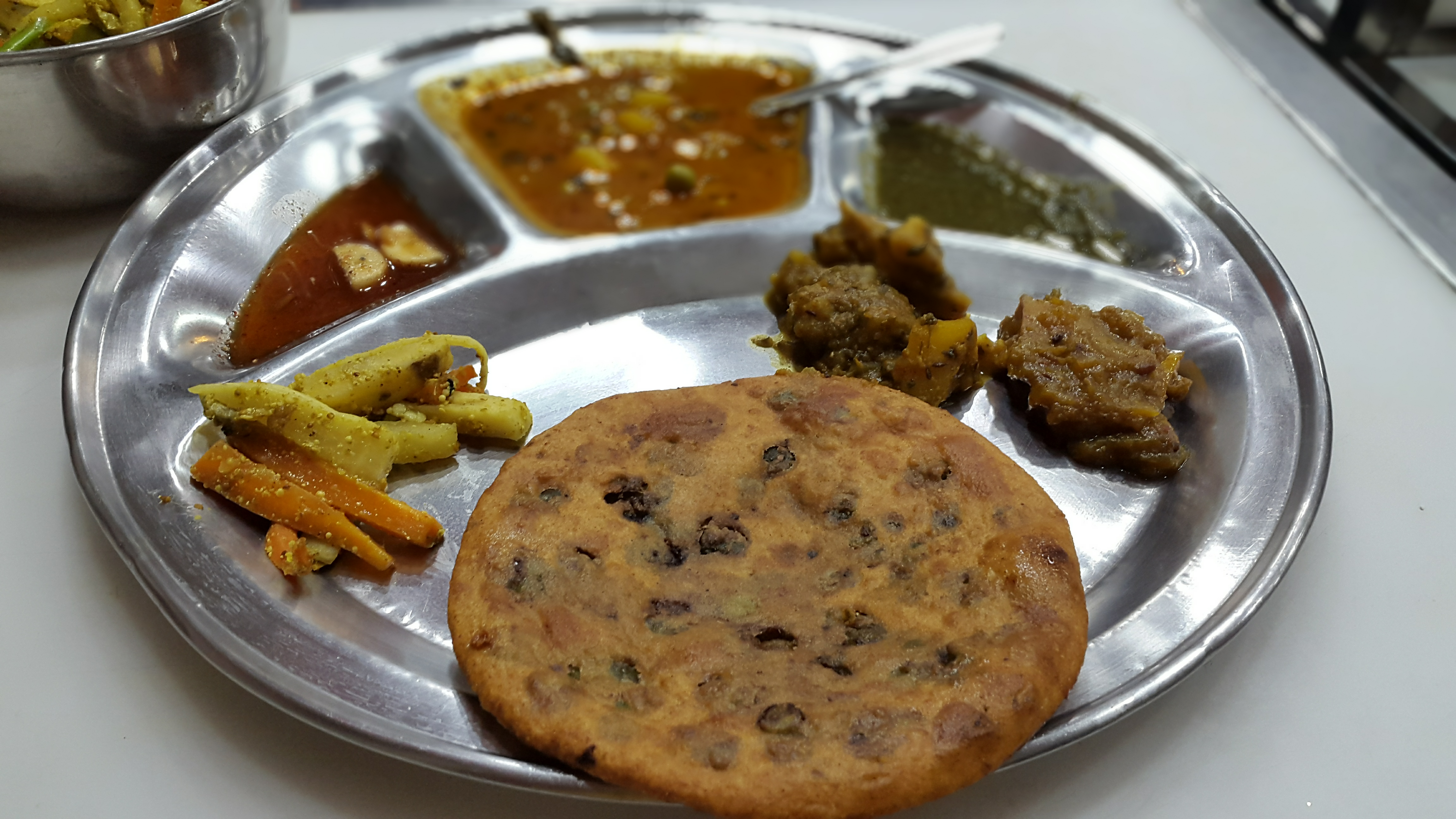
Pea paratha

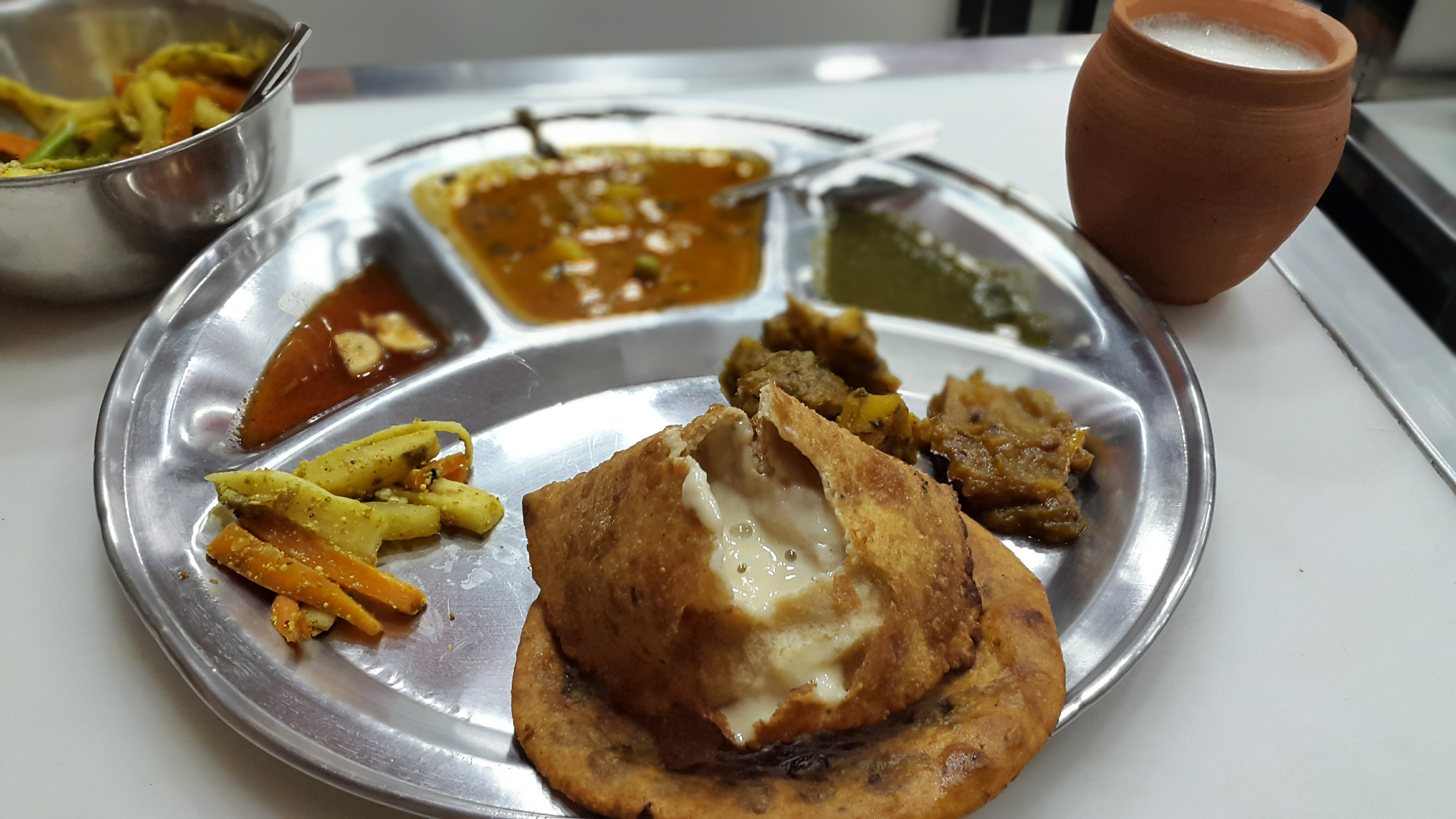
Rabdi paratha

Cooked dishes do not include onion or garlic, since the owners are Brahmins, and traditionally their clientele has included Jains in the neighborhood. Varieties include exotic fillings like kaju, badam, matar, Mix Paranthas, rabri, khoya parantha, gobhi parantha, and parat parantha. The parantha is always served with sweet tamarind chutney, mint chutney, mixed vegetable pickle, paneer and potato curry, potato and fenugreek curry, and a sauteed mash of sweet pumpkin.

== Drinks ==
Sweet lassi, often served in kulhars, is also a specialty of this place.

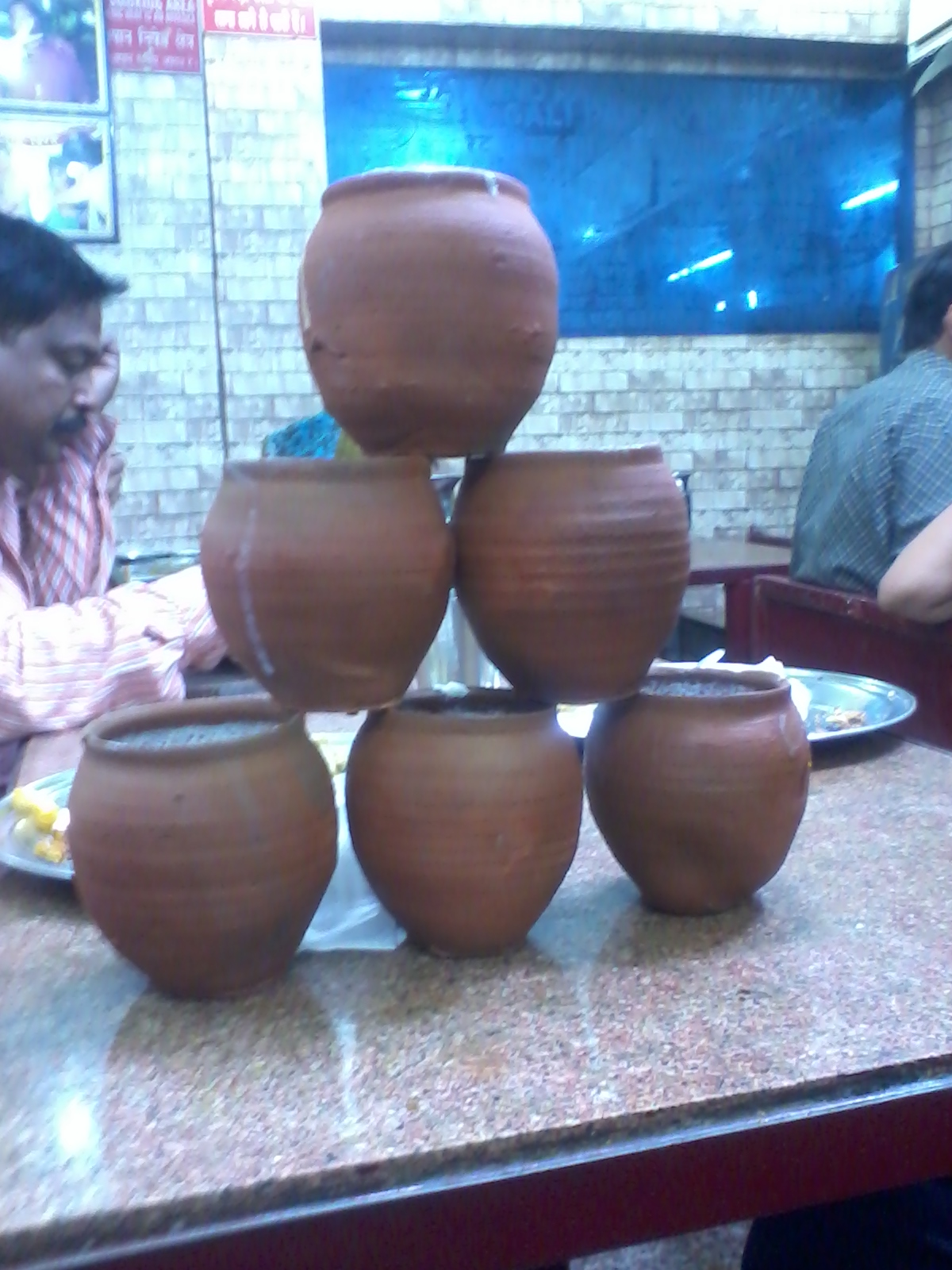
Lassi served in kulhad, a traditional method of serving drinks in India.
