= Siri Fort Auditorium =

Coordinates: 28.5532687°N 77.2107567°E

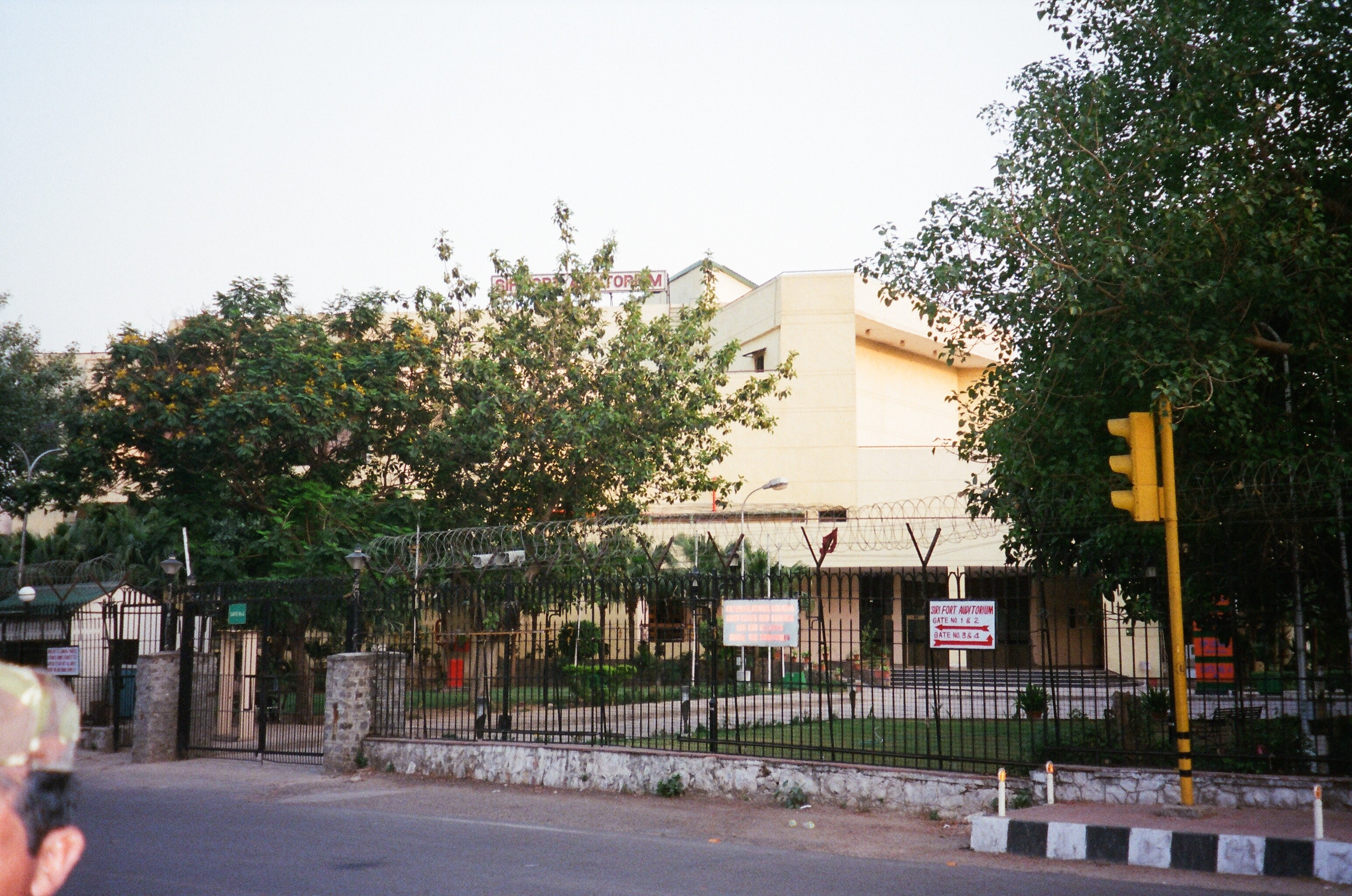
- Siri Fort auditorium complex entrance
- Interactive map of the Siri Fort Auditorium area

General information
- Type: auditorium complex
- Location: Khel Gaon Road, Siri Fort, South Delhi - 110049
- Opened: 1982
- Renovated: 2010
- Client: Government of India
- Owner: Directorate of Film Festivals, Ministry of Information and Broadcasting

Technical details
- Floor area: 8,312.44 m^{2} (89,474.4 sq ft)

Design and construction
- Main contractor: Delhi Development Authority

Siri Fort Auditorium is premier multi-auditorium complex of Government of India. Situated in the Siri Fort in South Delhi, it is also the headquarters of the Directorate of Film Festivals (DFF), Ministry of Information and Broadcasting, which also runs the complex. Also close by is the Siri Fort Sports Complex. It was a combined seating capacity of 2500, spread over its four auditoriums, making it the largest such complex in Delhi. Besides the National Film Festival organized by DFF wherein public screening of National Film Award winning films is held, it also hosts musical concerts, cultural performances, and plays.

== History ==
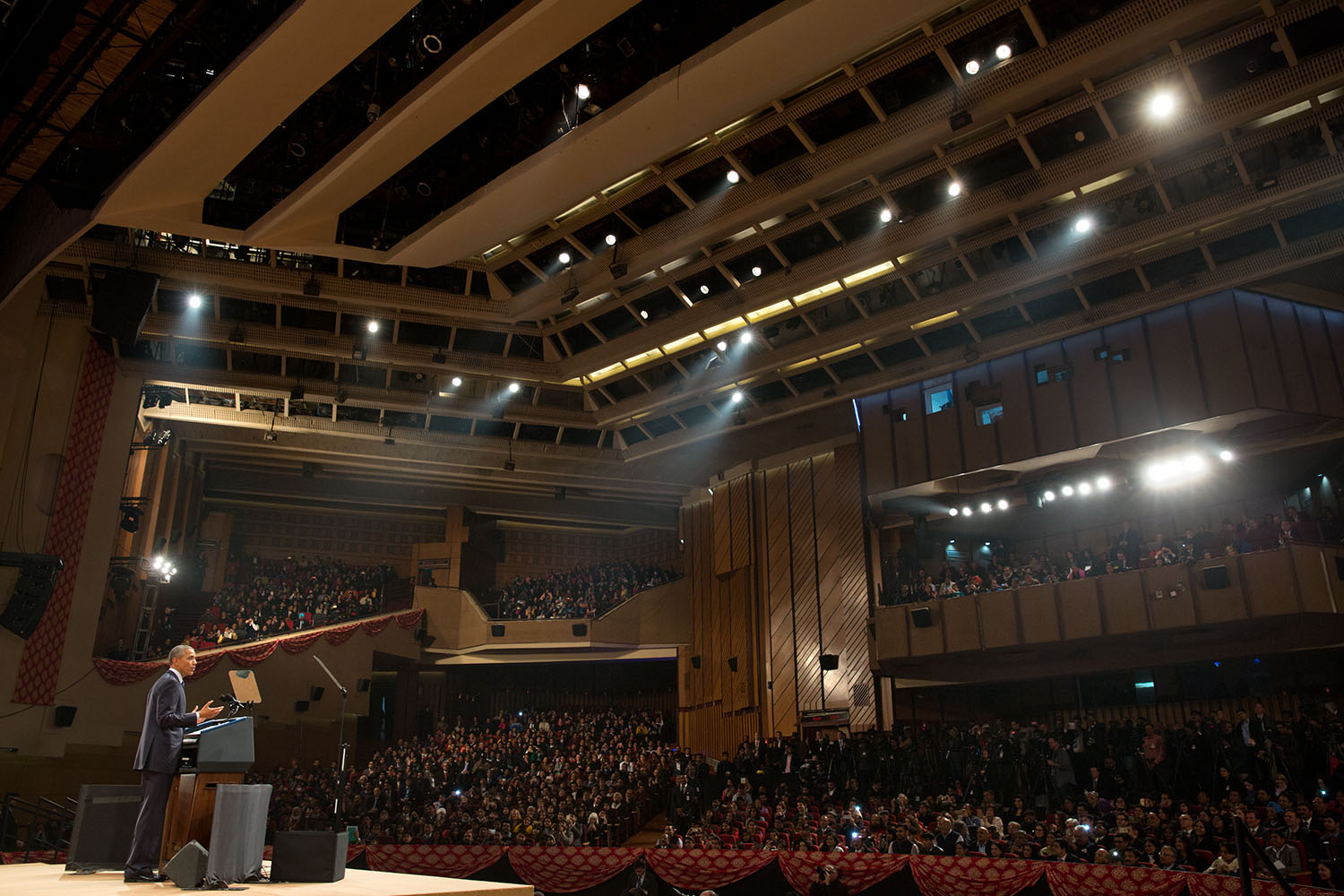
Interior view of Siri Fort Auditorium

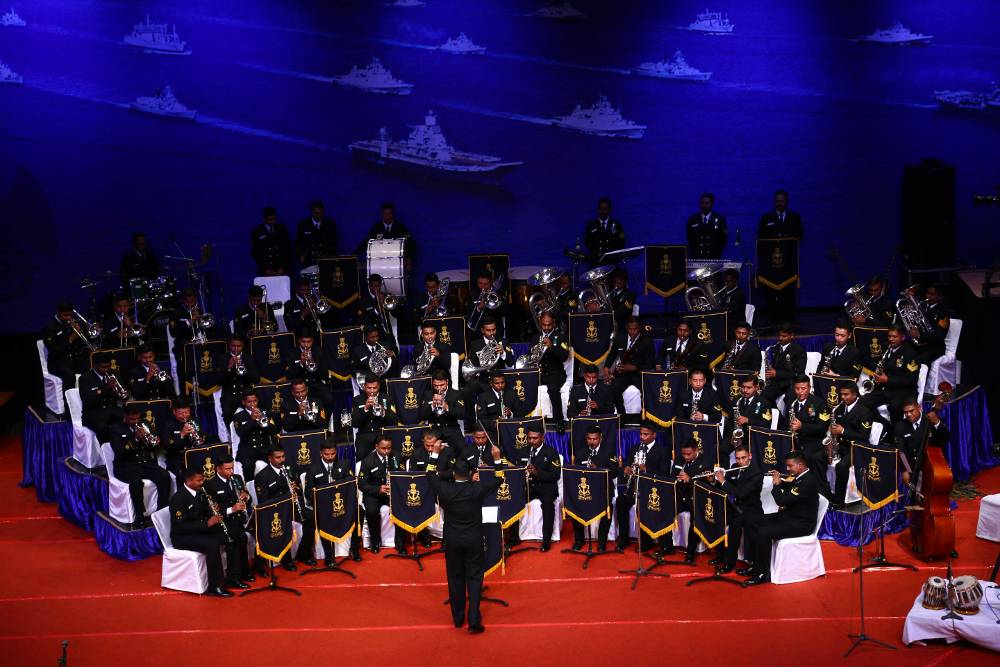
The Indian Navy Band performing during a concert held at Siri Fort Auditorium in New Delhi, 19 February 2016.

Built in the historic Siri Fort area, the 14th-century settlement of Delhi built by Alauddin Khalji the main auditorium no. I, was built by the Delhi Development Authority (DDA) during 1982 Asian Games held in Delhi. In 1986, the auditorium was taken over by the Ministry of Information and Broadcasting at a cost ₹98,147,000 (US$1.0 million). Subsequently, the Ministry added three smaller auditoriums, Auditorium-II in 1992, Auditorium-III in 1996 and Auditorium-IV in 2003 The complex underwent a renovation in 2009–2010.

== Transport ==
The nearest station of Delhi Metro is Hauz Khas metro station located on the Yellow Line

== See also ==
- Yashobhoomi
- Kamani Auditorium
