= The Zeitgeist Movement =

Movement emerging from the Zeitgeist film series

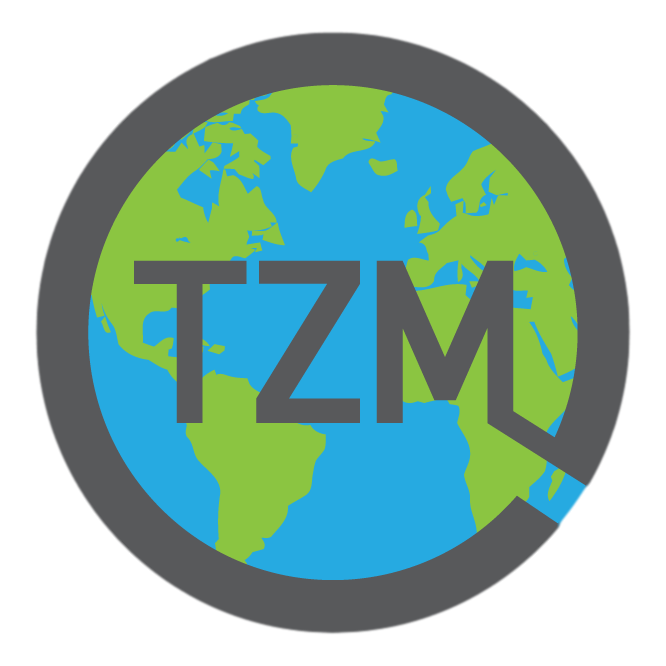
- Abbreviation: TZM
- Formation: 2008; 17 years ago
- Type: Advocacy group
- Region served: International
- Key people: Peter Joseph
- Website: thezeitgeistmovement.com

The Zeitgeist Movement is an activist movement established in the United States in 2008 by Peter Joseph. The group is critical of market capitalism, describing it as structurally corrupt and wasteful of resources. The group dismisses historic religious concepts as misleading, and embraces sustainable ecology and scientific administration of society. VC Reporter's Shane Cohn summarized the movement's charter as: "Our greatest social problems are the direct results of our economic system".

== History ==
The Zeitgeist Movement was formed in 2008 by Joseph shortly after the late 2008 release of Zeitgeist: Addendum, the second film in the Zeitgeist film series.

Zeitgeist was first linked to the Venus Project, which had been founded by Jacque Fresco in 1985. In April 2011, partnership between the two groups ended in an apparent power struggle, with Joseph commenting, "Without [the Zeitgeist Movement], [the Venus Project] doesn’t exist – it has nothing but ideas and has no viable method to bring it to light."

The first Zeitgeist documentary which predates the organization Zeitgeist movement, borrowed from the works of Eustace Mullins, Lyndon LaRouche, and radio host Alex Jones. Much of its footage was taken directly from Alex Jones documentaries.

The group holds an annual event, Z-Day (or Zeitgeist Day), an "educational forum" held in March. The New York Times reported on the second Z-Day held at Manhattan Community College in New York in 2009 which included lectures by Peter Joseph and Jacque Fresco. This event sold out with 900 people paying $10 each to attend. The event's organizers said that 450 connected events in 70 countries around the globe also took place.

== Reactions ==
An article in the Journal of Contemporary Religion describes the movement as an example of a "conspirituality", a synthesis of New Age spirituality and conspiracy theory.

Michelle Goldberg of Tablet Magazine called the movement "the world's first Internet-based apocalyptic cult, with members who parrot the party line with cheerful, rote fidelity." In her opinion, the movement is "devoted to a kind of sci-fi planetary communism", and the 2007 documentary that "sparked" the movement was "steeped in far-right, isolationist, and covertly anti-Semitic conspiracy theories."

Alan Feuer of The New York Times said the movement was like "a utopian presentation of a money-free and computer-driven vision of the future, a wholesale reimagination of civilization, as if Karl Marx and Carl Sagan had hired John Lennon from his "Imagine" days to do no less than redesign the underlying structures of planetary life."

== See also ==
- Anti-consumerism
- Criticism of capitalism
- Environmental movement
- Environmentalism
- Money Free Party
- Pastel QAnon
- Post-growth
- Post-scarcity economy
- Structural fix
- Technocracy
- Technological utopianism
- Veganism
- Yellow socialism
