= Resource Based Economy =

Resource Based Economy may refer to:

- Resource-based economy - economies based on natural resources
- The Venus Project and The Zeitgeist Movement - which propose the post-scarcity 'resource based economy' as an alternative to the current (monetary-based) system
