= Jacque Fresco =

American futurist (1916–2017)

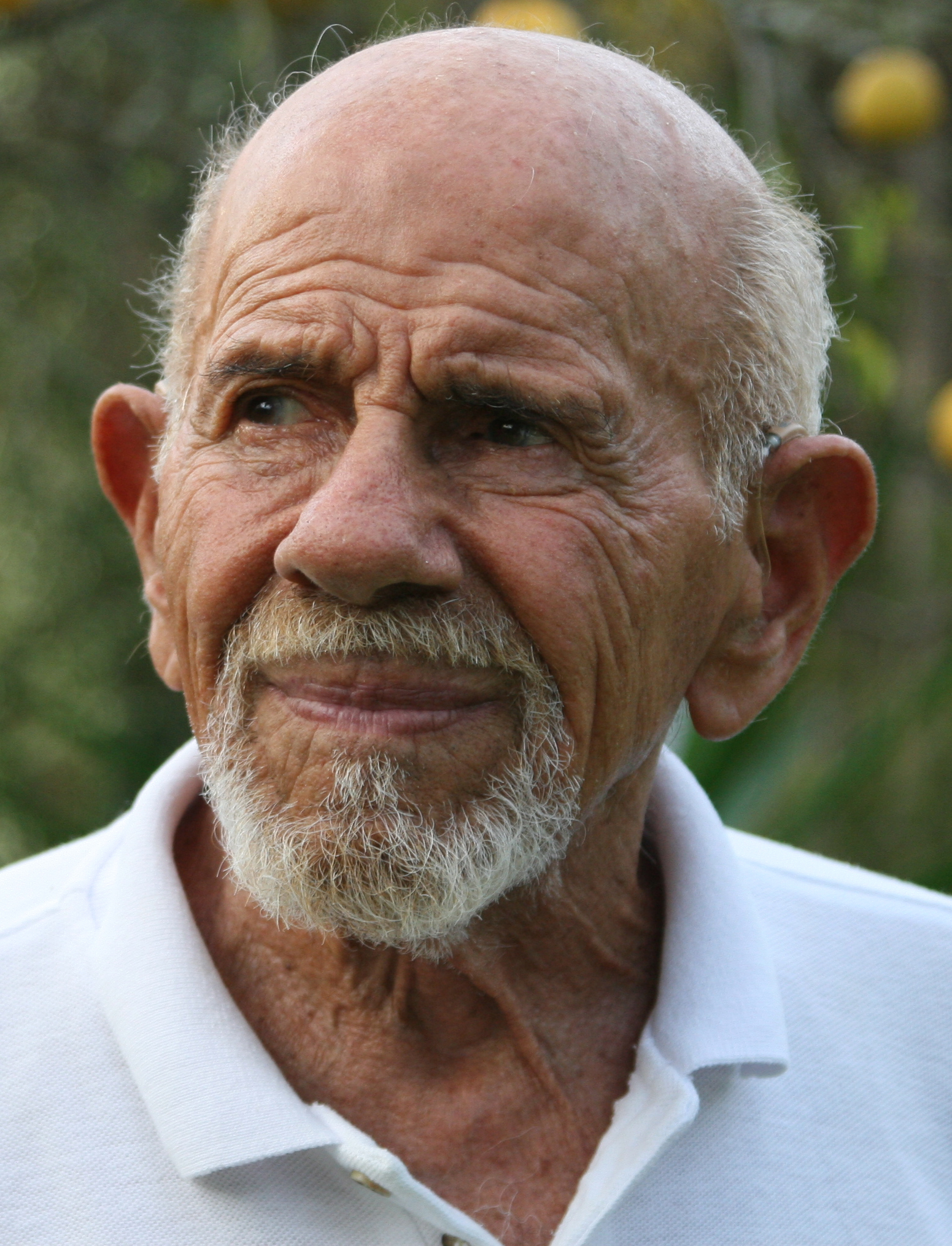
- Born: March 13, 1916; Manhattan, New York, U.S.
- Died: May 18, 2017 (aged 101); Sebring, Florida, U.S.
- Occupations: Futurist, social engineer, structural engineer, architectural designer, industrial designer, author, lecturer
- Known for: The Venus Project and later career, resource-based economy ideas.
- Notable work: Looking Forward (1969), The Best That Money Can't Buy (2002)
- Website: www.thevenusproject.com

Jacque Fresco (March 13, 1916 – May 18, 2017) was an American futurist and self-described social engineer. Self-taught, he worked in a variety of positions related to industrial design.

Fresco wrote and lectured his views on sustainable cities, energy efficiency, natural-resource management, cybernetic technology, automation, and the role of science in society. He directed The Venus Project and advocated global implementation of a socioeconomic system which he referred to as a "resource-based economy".

== Early life ==
Jacque Fresco was born on March 13, 1916, and grew up in a Sephardi Jewish household, at the family's home in Bensonhurst, in the Brooklyn borough of New York City. Fresco's father was an agriculturist born in Constantinople (now Istanbul, Turkey), while his mother Lena was an emigrant from Jerusalem. He later turned his attention to technocracy. A teenager during the Great Depression, he spent time with friends discussing Charles Darwin, Albert Einstein, science, and the future. Fresco attended the Young Communist League before being "physically ejected" for loudly stating that "Karl Marx was wrong!" after a discussion with the league president during a meeting. He left home at the age of 14, hitchhiking and "jumping" trains as one of the so-called "Wild Boys of the Road".

== Career ==
=== Aircraft industry ===
Fresco worked at Douglas Aircraft Company in California during the late 1930s. He presented designs including a flying wing and a disk-shaped aircraft. Some of his designs were considered impractical at the time and Fresco's design ideas were not adopted. Fresco resigned from Douglas because of design disagreements.

In 1942, Fresco was drafted into the U.S. Army. He was assigned technical design duties for the Army Air Forces at Wright Field design laboratories in Dayton, Ohio. One design he produced was a "radical variable camber wing" with which he attempted to optimize flight control by allowing the pilot to adjust the thickness and lift of the wings during flight. Fresco did not adjust to military life and was discharged.

Worked for Ernst Udet according to his Talk in Stockholm, 2010.

=== Trend Home ===
Fresco was commissioned by Earl "Madman" Muntz, to design low cost housing. Muntz invested $500,000 seed money in the project. Fresco, 32 years old at the time, along with his associates Harry Giaretto and Eli Catran conceived, designed and engineered a project house called the Trend Home. Fresco came closest to traditional career success with this project. Built mostly of aluminum and glass, it was on prominent display at Stage 8 of the Warner Bros. Sunset Lot in Hollywood for three months. The home could be toured for one dollar, with proceeds going to the Cancer Prevention Society. In the summer of 1948, a Federal Housing Administration official met Muntz about the project. The official's proposal, according to Muntz, would add a bureaucratic overhead negating the low production costs. Without federal or further private funding the project did not go into mass production. This experience led Fresco to the conclusion that society would have to change for his inventions to reach their potential.

=== Scientific Research Laboratories ===
In the late 1940s, Fresco created and was director of Scientific Research Laboratories in Los Angeles. Here he also gave lectures, and taught technical design, meanwhile researching and working on inventions as a freelance inventor and scientific consultant. During this period, Fresco struggled to get his research funded and faced setbacks and financial difficulties. In 1955, Fresco left California after his laboratory was removed to build the Golden State Freeway.

== Midlife ==
In 1955 Fresco moved to Miami, Florida. He opened a business as a psychological consultant, but had no formal schooling in the subject. Receiving a "barrage of criticism" from the American Psychological Association Fresco stopped that business. In a newspaper article from that time period Fresco claimed to have a degree from Sierra University, Los Angeles, California, which is unverified.

Fresco described white supremacist organizations he joined to test the feasibility of changing people. He tells of joining a local Ku Klux Klan and White Citizens Council in an attempt to change their views about racial discrimination.

In Miami Fresco presented designs of a circular city. Fresco made his living working as an industrial designer for various companies such as Alcoa and the Major Realty Corporation.

In 1961, with Pietro Belluschi and C. Frederick Wise, Fresco collaborated on a project known as the Sandwich House. Consisting of mostly prefabricated components, partitions, and aluminum, the project sold houses for $2,950, or $7,500 with foundation and all internal installations. During this period, Fresco supported his projects by designing prefabricated aluminum devices through Jacque Fresco Enterprises Inc.

From 1955 to 1969 Fresco named his social ideas "Project Americana".

=== Looking Forward ===
Looking Forward was published in 1969. Author Ken Keyes Jr., and Jacque Fresco coauthored the book. Looking Forward is a speculative look at the future. The authors picture an ideal 'cybernetic society in which want has been banished and work and personal possessions no longer exist; individual gratification is the total concern'.

=== Sociocyberneering, Inc. ===
Fresco formed "Sociocyberneering", a membership organization claiming 250 members, according to an interview with Fresco. He hosted lectures in Miami Beach and Coral Gables. Fresco promoted his organization by lecturing at universities and appearing on radio and television. Although Fresco is presented as a 'Doctor' on the Larry King show there is no evidence of that being the case. Fresco did not complete high school. Fresco's "sociocyberneering" as a membership group was discontinued and land was purchased at another location in rural Venus, Florida. He established his home and research center there.

== The Venus Project and later career ==
Fresco, with his partner Roxanne Meadows, founded The Venus Project in 1985 and supported it in the 1990s through freelance inventing, industrial engineering, conventional architectural modeling, and invention consultations.

In 2008, Peter Joseph featured Fresco in the film Zeitgeist Addendum where his ideas of the future were given as possible alternatives. Peter Joseph, founder of the Zeitgeist Movement began advocating Fresco's approach. In April 2012, the two groups disassociated due to disagreements regarding goals and objectives.

Throughout 2010, Fresco traveled with Meadows worldwide to promote interest in the Venus Project. In June 2012, Maja Borg screened her film, Future My Love, at the Edinburgh International Film Festival featuring the work of Fresco and Roxanne Meadows.

== Personal life and family ==
Fresco was born to immigrants from the Middle East, Isaac and Lena Fresco. His father was born in 1880 and around 1905 immigrated from Istanbul to New York where he worked as a horticulturist. He died in 1963. Fresco's mother was born in 1887 in Jerusalem and also migrated to New York around 1904. She died in 1988. Fresco was brother to two siblings, a sister, Freda, and a brother, David.

Fresco had two marriages when he lived in Los Angeles and carried his second marriage through his first couple of years in Miami. He divorced his second wife in 1957 and remained unmarried thereafter. His second wife, Patricia, gave birth to a son, Richard, in 1953 and a daughter, Bambi, in 1956. Richard was an army private and died in 1976. Bambi died of cancer in 2010.

Fresco died on May 18, 2017, in his sleep at his home in Sebring, Florida, from complications of Parkinson's disease at the age of 101.

Roxanne Meadows assisted Fresco from 1976. As Fresco's domestic partner and administrative colleague, she oversees much of the management of the Venus Project.

== Critical appraisals ==
It's a "lack of professional engagement", William Gazecki says, that hurt Fresco the most. Gazecki completed Future by Design, a feature-length profile of Jacque Fresco, in 2006. "The real missing link in Jacque's world is having put Jacque to work," Gazecki says, "[It's] exemplified when people say: 'Well, show me some buildings he's built. And I don't mean the domes out in Venus. I mean, let's see an office building, let's see a manufacturing plant, let's see a circular city.' And that's where he should have been 30 years ago. He should have been applying his work, in the real world ... [but] he's not a collaborator, and I think that's why he's never had great public achievements."

When asked by a reporter why he had such difficulty actualizing his many ideas, Fresco responded, "Because I can't get to anybody."

=== Views on Fresco ===
Fresco's critical view of modern economics has been compared to Thorstein Veblen's concept of "the predatory phase in human development", according to an article in the journal Society and Business Review. Grønborg has labeled other facets of Fresco's ideology a "tabula rasa approach".

Synergetics theorist Arthur Coulter called Fresco's city designs "organic" and "evolutionary", rather than revolutionary. Coulter posits such cities as the answer to Walter B. Cannon's idea of achieving homeostasis for society.

=== Hypothetical form of governance ===
Fresco described his form of governance in this way: "The aims of The Venus Project have no parallel in history, not with communism, socialism, fascism or any other political ideology. This is true because cybernation is of recent origin. With this system, the system of financial influence and control will no longer exist."

Ludwig von Mises Institute scholar Robert P. Murphy has raised the economic calculation problem against a resource-based economy. In a resource-based economy, Murphy believes there would be no ability to calculate the availability and desirability of resources because the price mechanism is not utilized. Addressing this aspect, another article in the Quarterly Journal of Austrian Economics states criticism of "central plannings" computation problem applies to the ideas of Fresco.

=== Question of utopianism ===
The Venus Project states on its website that it is not utopian. Writing for the Copenhagen Institute for Futures Studies, Nikolina Olsen-Rule supports this idea, writing: "For most people, the promise of the project sounds like an unattainable utopia, but if you examine it more closely, there are surprisingly many scientifically founded arguments that open up an entire new world of possibilities."

Morten Grønborg, also of Copenhagen Institute for Futures Studies, comments that the Venus Project is "this visionary idea of a future society has many characteristics in common with the utopia. ... the word utopia carries a double meaning, since in Greek it can mean both the good place (eutopia) and the nonexisting place (outopia). A good place is precisely what Fresco has devoted his life to describing and fighting for."

=== Comments on Fresco ===
Hans-Ulrich Obrist wrote that "Fresco's future may, of course, seem outmoded and his writings have been subject to critique for their fascistic undertones of order and similitude, but his contributions are etched in the popular psyche and his eco-friendly concepts continue to influence our present generation of progressive architects, city planners and designers."

Fresco's work gained the attention of science fiction enthusiast and critic Forrest J Ackerman. Fresco later attracted Star Trek animator, Doug Drexler, who worked with Fresco to produce several computer renderings of his designs.

Commenting on Fresco, physicist Paul G. Hewitt wrote that Fresco inspired him toward a career in physical science.

=== Awards ===
In July 2016, Jacque Fresco received a Novus Summit award for City Design/Community. Novus Summit is supported by the United Nations Department of Economic and Social Affairs (UN DESA).

== Works ==
=== Books ===
- with Keyes, Ken (1969). Looking Forward. South Brunswick, New Jersey: A.S. Barnes. (1969). ISBN 0-498-06752-1. OCLC 21606.
- Introduction to Sociocyberneering. Lidiraven Books. 1977. OCLC 6036204.
- The Venus Project: The Redesign of Culture. Venus, Florida: Global Cyber-Visions. 1995. ISBN 0-9648806-0-1. OCLC 33896367.
- The Best that Money Can't Buy: Beyond Politics, Poverty & War. Venus, Florida: Global Cyber-Visions. 2002. ISBN 0-9648806-7-9. OCLC 49931422.
- Designing the Future (PDF). Venus, Florida: The Venus Project, Inc. 2007. OCLC 568770383.

== See also ==
- The Zeitgeist Movement
