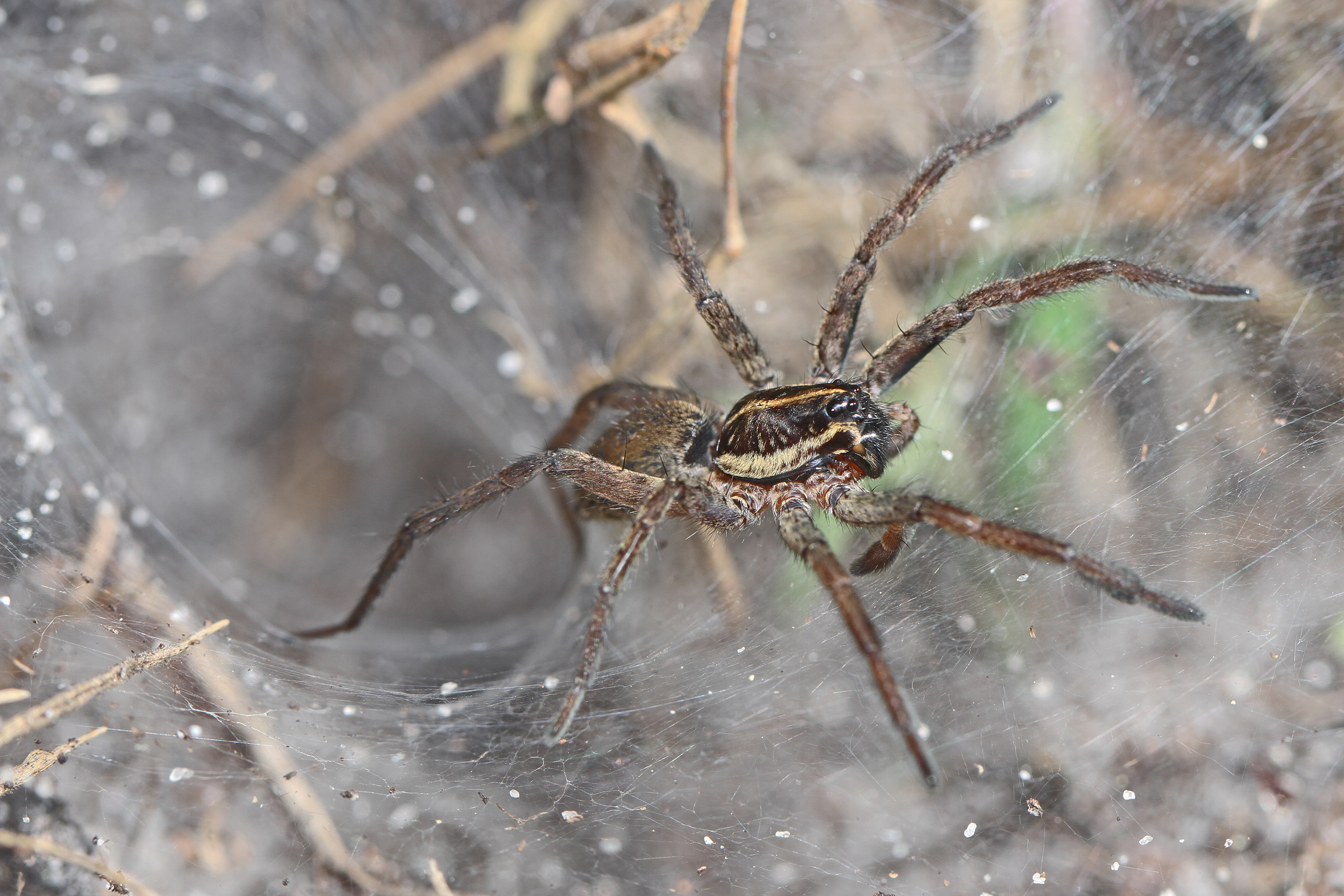
- Sosippus sp. from Florida

Scientific classification
- Kingdom: Animalia
- Phylum: Arthropoda
- Subphylum: Chelicerata
- Class: Arachnida
- Order: Araneae
- Infraorder: Araneomorphae
- Family: Lycosidae
- Genus: Sosippus; Simon, 1888

Species
- See text

Diversity
- 10 species

= Sosippus =

Genus of spiders

The spider genus Sosippus is, with other genera in the subfamily Hippasinae, unique among the spiders in the family Lycosidae in producing a large funnel-web resembling that of the Agelenidae. The posterior spinnerets are more elongate than in other wolf spiders.

Eye arrangement in female S. texanus

Their eyes are arranged in three rows, with four small eyes in the anterior (lowest), two large eyes in the second, and two smaller lateral eyes in the third row.

Sosippus is found from Central America to the southern United States.

The closest relatives are found in the genus Aglaoctenus.

The species of Sosippus seem to have diverged relatively recently in geologic time.

== Species ==
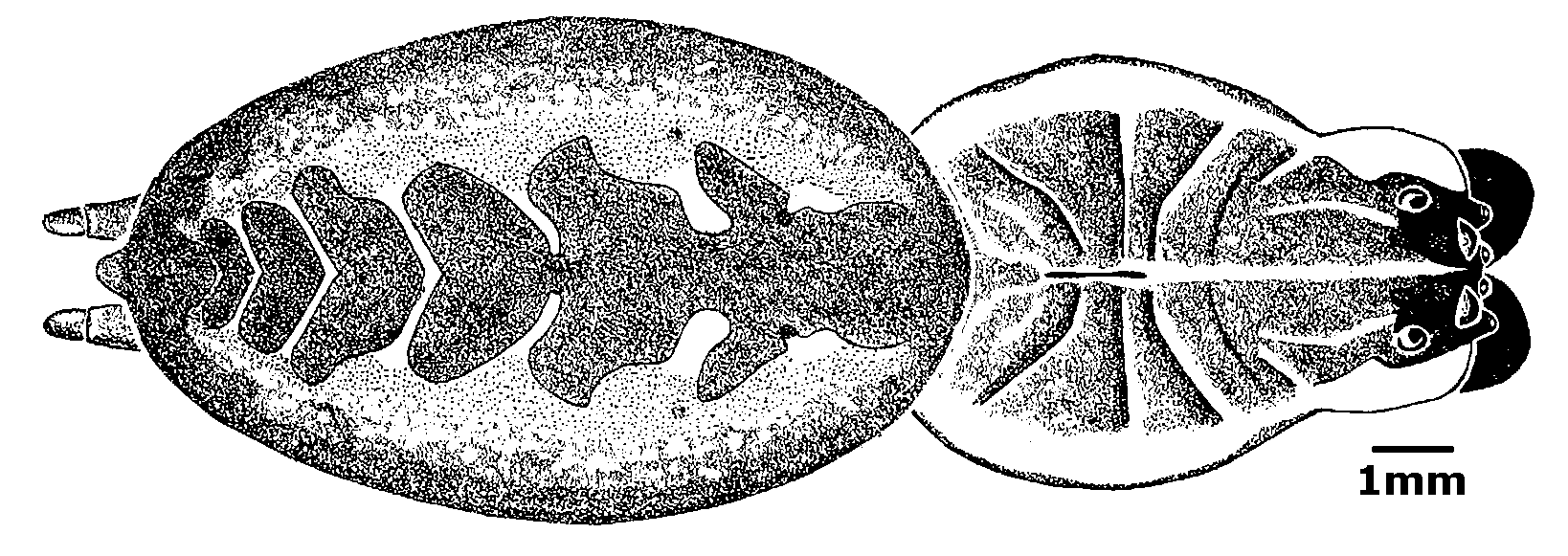
S. californicus

- Sosippus agalenoides Banks, 1909 (Mexico to Costa Rica)
- Sosippus californicus Simon, 1898 (USA, Mexico)
- Sosippus floridanus Simon, 1898 (USA)
- Sosippus janus Brady, 1972 (USA)
- Sosippus mexicanus Simon, 1888 (Mexico, Guatemala)
- Sosippus michoacanus Brady, 1962 (Mexico)
- Sosippus mimus Chamberlin, 1924 (USA)
- Sosippus placidus Brady, 1972 (USA)
- Sosippus plutonus Brady, 1962 (Mexico)
- Sosippus texanus Brady, 1962 (USA)
