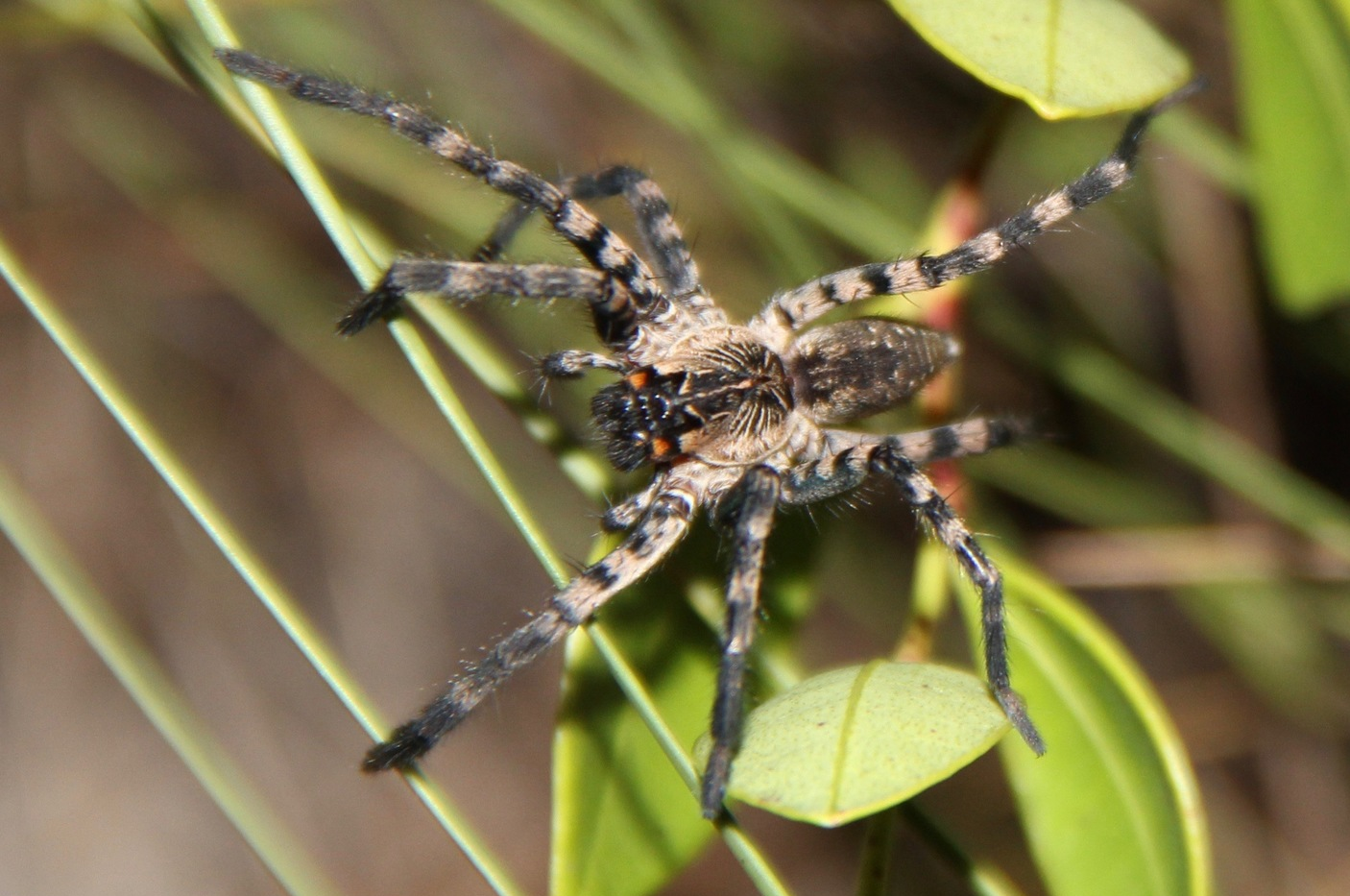
- Sosippus placidus in Venus, Florida

Conservation status
- Vulnerable (IUCN 2.3)

- Critically Imperiled (NatureServe)

Scientific classification
- Kingdom: Animalia
- Phylum: Arthropoda
- Subphylum: Chelicerata
- Class: Arachnida
- Order: Araneae
- Infraorder: Araneomorphae
- Family: Lycosidae
- Genus: Sosippus
- Species: S. placidus

Binomial name
- Sosippus placidus Brady, 1972

Synonyms
- Sosippus mimus (misidentified)

= Lake Placid funnel wolf spider =

Species of spider

The Lake Placid funnel wolf spider (Sosippus placidus) is a species of spider in the family Lycosidae.

It is endemic to Florida scrub habitats in Highlands County, Florida, United States. Their limited distribution appears to be similar to that of several other notable Florida scrub arthropods.

== Conservation ==
The species is threatened by its restricted habitat requirements, further enhanced by its status as a gap specialist, requiring open-canopy sandy exposures which can become vanishingly rare as a result of fire-suppression and land mismanagement. It also seems to have limited dispersal abilities, so extirpations are unlikely to be reversed without human-assisted reintroductions.
