= Conspirituality =

Term for conspiracy theories + spirituality

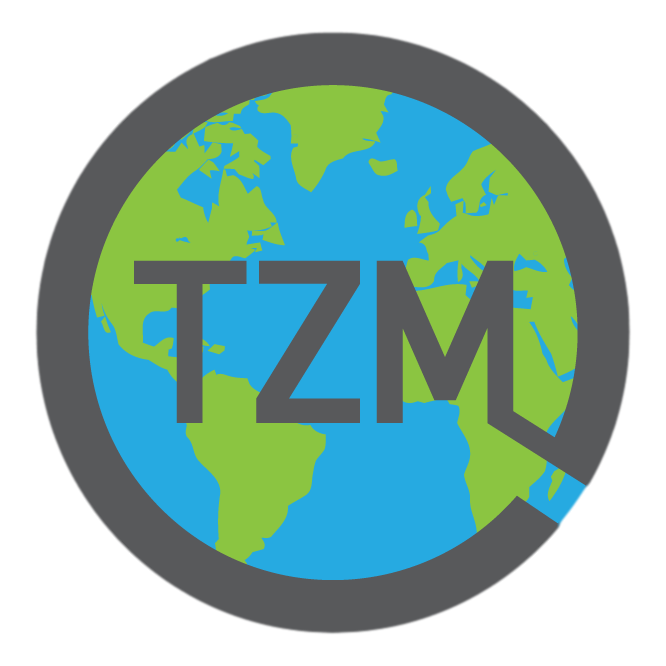
The Zeitgeist Movement, an activist group, has been called a part of the conspirituality movement.

Conspirituality is a portmanteau neologism describing the overlap of conspiracy theories with spirituality, typically of New Age varieties. Contemporary conspirituality became common in the 1990s.

== Characterization ==
The term was coined by independent researcher and proponent Charlotte Ward and sociologist David Voas while writing the article around 2009 (it was published in 2011 in the Journal of Contemporary Religion). The word had been invented by a Canadian hip hop group. They characterized the movement as follows:

It offers a broad politico-spiritual philosophy based on two core convictions, the first traditional to conspiracy theory, the second rooted in the New Age: 1) a secret group covertly controls, or is trying to control, the political and social order, and 2) humanity is undergoing a "paradigm shift" in consciousness. Proponents believe that the best strategy for dealing with the threat of a totalitarian "new world order" is to act in accordance with an awakened "new paradigm" worldview.

A 2020 opinion piece in ABC Australia said that, as with other extremist movements, the conspirituality narrative portrayed its followers as more enlightened than mainstream society and prone to persecution due to their awareness of the "real truth". Ward and Voas considered the combination of optimistic, holistic New Age culture and pessimistic, conservative conspiracy culture to be paradoxical. Conspirituality includes the "dark occulture" of conspiracy culture. The uniting philosophy of conspirituality movements is a belief that society is under covert control by a group of elites, and that it can be emancipated from that control by a "paradigm shift in consciousness that harnesses cosmic forces". The appeal of conspirituality is the narcissistic idea of being the one to unravel the true explanations for all that is wrong in the world.

Alex McKeen, writing in The Toronto Star, says:

Conspiritualists share a conviction that enlightenment exists in a dimension that is separate and above politics, science and everything as banal as "three dimensional" human concerns (a common spirituality trope is reaching five-dimensional consciousness). Once you experience it — and it's a subjective, private experience — you can't relate anymore in "3D."

Asbjørn Dyrendal counters that combining conspiracy theory with New Age spirituality is not new, and that Western esotericism is inherently suspicious. Both conspiracy culture and esotericism emphasize secrecy and the revelation of higher knowledge. He identifies Marta Steinsvik, Alf Larsen, Bertram Dybwad Brochmann, and neo-paganism as early examples of the promotion of alternate spirituality and conspiracy theory. Jules Evans, an honorary research fellow at the Center for the History of Emotions at Queen Mary University of London, identifies an overlap between alternative spirituality and far-right populism among traditionalists.

Ward and Voas said that sometimes those with New Age beliefs are more prone to thinking like conspiracy theorists. The study describes The Zeitgeist Movement, an activist group, as being a part of the conspirituality movement. Conspirituality has been linked to the far-right conspiracy theory QAnon and COVID-19 conspiracy theories, as well as the Movement for Spiritual Integration into the Absolute (MISA) and the New Age religious movement Love Has Won. Online yoga and wellness communities have seen members posting conspiracies about COVID-19, masks, and QAnon-related child exploitation claims. 9/11 conspiracy theories spread through new age communities such as "lightworkers" and "indigo children". Anthropologist of religion Dr. Adam Klin-Oron says that in Israel, "we are seeing people who used to talk about 'love' and 'light' standing shoulder to shoulder with those who believe there is a ring of pedophiles that drink the blood of babies".

In Norway, the online magazine Nyhetsspeilet (The News Mirror) has been described as the "flagship of conspirituality". Its goal for "triple awakening" focuses on consciousness and spirituality, extraterrestrial visitors, and New World Order conspiracy theories. The Conspirituality podcast updates listeners on the intersection between the "wellness" industry and conspiracy theories, referring to it as "disaster spirituality".

== People described as members of the movement ==
- Jake Angeli, an American conspiracy theorist also known as the "QAnon Shaman"
- Pete Evans, an Australian chef and conspiracy theorist
- David Icke, an English conspiracy theorist
- Russell Brand, an English comedian, activist, and convicted rapist
- Christiane Northrup, an obstetrician and gynecologist who promotes pseudoscience
- JP Sears, an American YouTuber and comedian
- Teal Swan, an American influencer and author

== See also ==
- Matthew Remski, writer and one of the hosts of Conspirituality Podcast.
- Gaia, Inc.
- Pastel QAnon
- Christian fundamentalism and conspiracy theories
- Brainwashing
- Improvisational millennialism, similar concept by Michael Barkun
