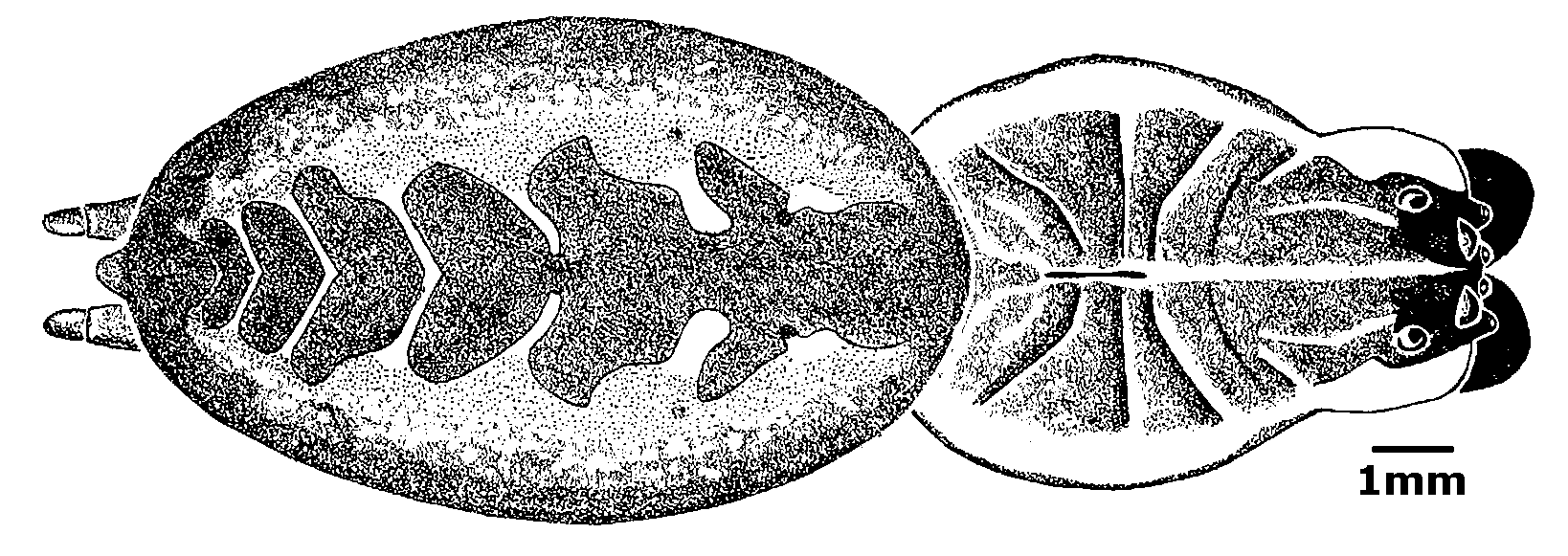

Scientific classification
- Kingdom: Animalia
- Phylum: Arthropoda
- Subphylum: Chelicerata
- Class: Arachnida
- Order: Araneae
- Infraorder: Araneomorphae
- Family: Lycosidae
- Genus: Sosippus
- Species: S. californicus

Binomial name
- Sosippus californicus Simon, 1898

= Sosippus californicus =

Species of spider

Sosippus californicus is a species of wolf spider in the family Lycosidae. It is found in the United States and Mexico.
