= Peter Joseph =

American filmmaker and activist (born 1979)

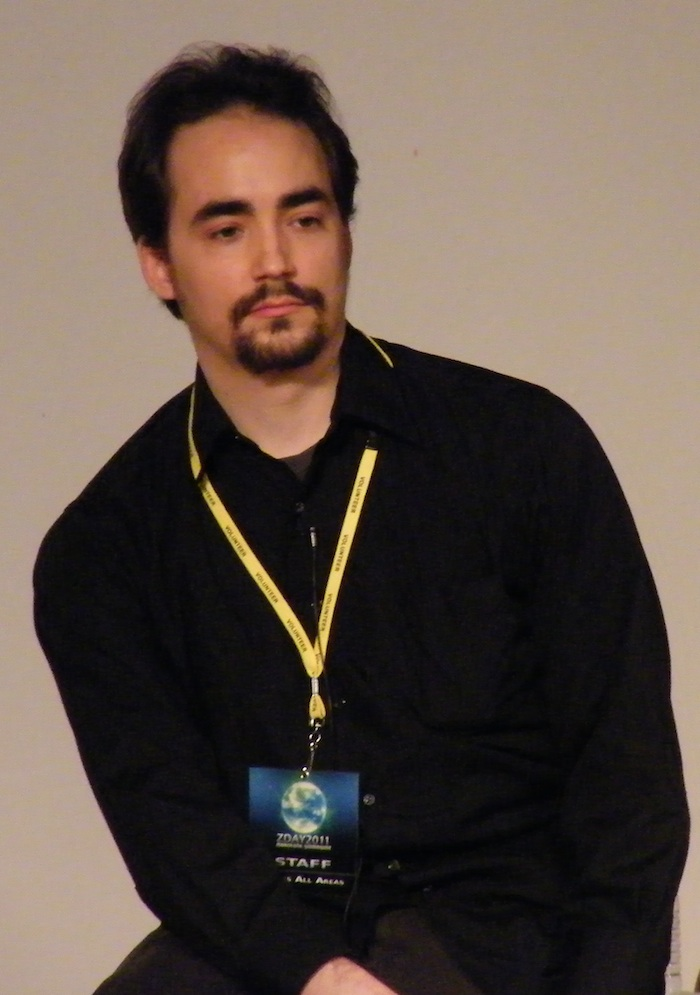
- Joseph in 2010
- Born: February 4, 1979 (age 47); Winston-Salem, North Carolina, United States
- Education: University of North Carolina School of the Arts; The New School for Social Research
- Occupations: Musician; Filmmaker; Author; Activist
- Years active: 2007–present
- Known for: The Zeitgeist Movement; Zeitgeist film series
- Website: peterjoseph.info

Peter Joseph (born February 4, 1979) is an American independent filmmaker, author, and social activist. He is best known for writing, directing, scoring, and producing the Zeitgeist film series. He is also the founder of the related Zeitgeist Movement. Other work by Joseph includes the 2017 book The New Human Rights Movement: Reinventing the Economy to End Oppression.

== Early life and education ==
Joseph was born in Winston-Salem, North Carolina in 1979 and attended the University of North Carolina and The New School.

== Career and activism ==
In 2008, Joseph founded the Zeitgeist Movement, a self-described "sustainability advocacy organization". It was originally started as the "activist arm" of an organization called the Venus Project, launched by Jacque Fresco in 1994. In 2011, the two organizations separated. The movement is critical of market capitalism and advocates sustainability, ecological concerns, and the application of science and technology to social organization.

In 2012, Joseph created the satirical miniseries Culture in Decline, which challenges various contemporary cultural phenomena. In June 2013, he directed the official music video for Black Sabbath's single "God Is Dead?", from the album 13. The video incorporates extensive footage and symbolism drawn from the Zeitgeist film series.

In March 2017, BenBella Books published Joseph's book The New Human Rights Movement. Abby Martin subsequently discussed the book and Joseph's views in an interview on Telesur.

== Revolution Now!, media coverage ==
In 2020, Joseph launched the weekly solo podcast Revolution Now!, which deals with systems science, structural economics, structural violence, and contemporary geopolitical affairs. Joseph's work with the movement and the Zeitgeist film trilogy has been the subject of national media attention, including articles in The New York Times, The Palm Beach Post, VC Reporter, and TheMarker.

== Filmography ==
Film

- Zeitgeist: The Movie (2007)
- Zeitgeist: Addendum (2008)
- Zeitgeist: Moving Forward (2011)
- InterReflections (2020)
- Zeitgeist: Requiem (2024)

Television

- Culture in Decline (2012)

Music videos

- "God Is Dead?" – Black Sabbath (2013)

== Publications ==
- Joseph, Peter; Murdock, D.M.; S, Acharya (January 19, 2011). The Zeitgeist Sourcebook, Part 1: The Greatest Story Ever Told. Stellar House Publishing.
- Joseph, Peter (January 1, 2014). The Zeitgeist Movement Defined: Realizing a New Train of Thought. ISBN 9781495303197.
- Joseph, Peter (April 3, 2018). The New Human Rights Movement: Reinventing the Economy to End Oppression. BenBella Books. ISBN 9781946885142.
- Joseph, Peter; Siddique, Julene (June 25, 2021). "The Social Architect: A New Framework for Effective Activism and Social Leadership". Cadmus. 4 (4).

== See also ==
- Post-scarcity economy
- Technocracy
