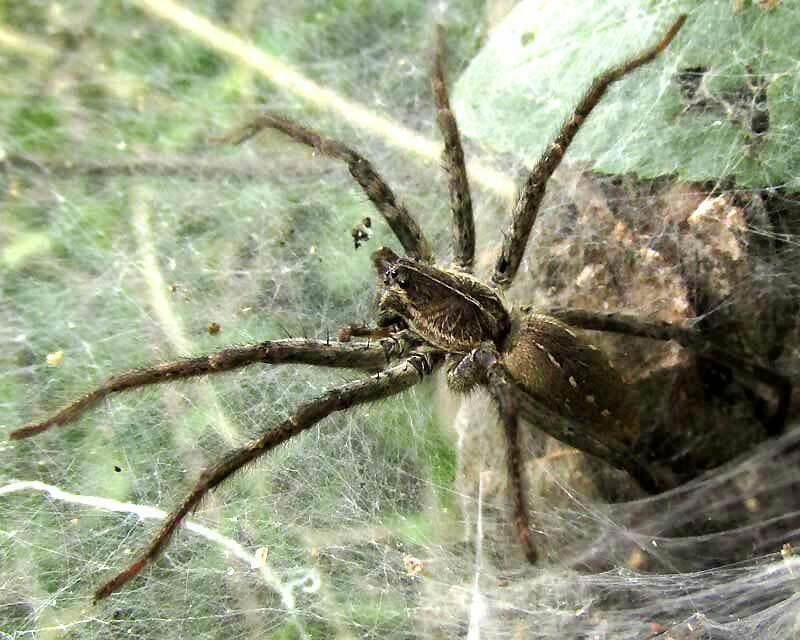
- Sosippus mexicanus at web opening

Scientific classification
- Kingdom: Animalia
- Phylum: Arthropoda
- Subphylum: Chelicerata
- Class: Arachnida
- Order: Araneae
- Infraorder: Araneomorphae
- Superfamily: Lycosoidea
- Family: Lycosidae
- Genus: Sosippus
- Species: S. mexicanus

Binomial name
- Sosippus mexicanus Simon, 1888

= Sosippus mexicanus =

Species of spider

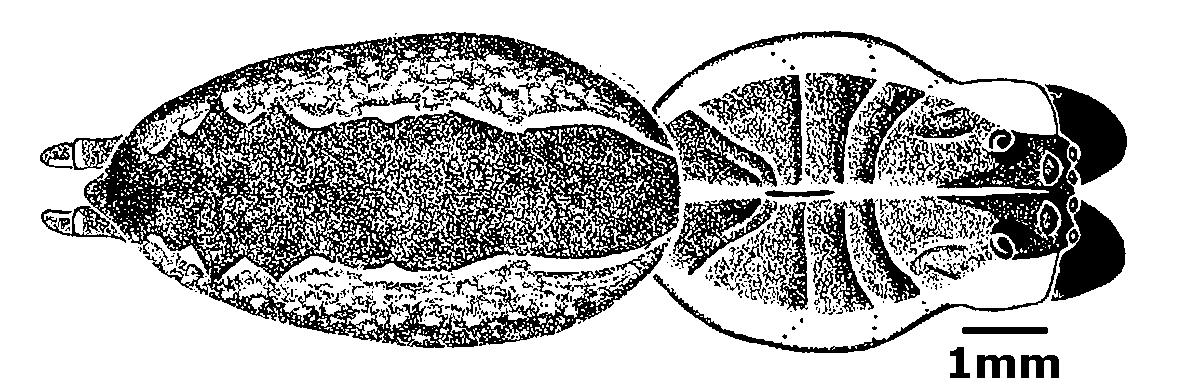
Sosippus mexicanus body design of female

Sosippus mexicanus, with no English name, though all species of Sosippus can be referred to as funnel-web spiders, is native to southern Mexico and northern Central America. It belongs to the wolf spider family, the Lycosidae.

== Description ==
Here are some key identification features of Sosippus mexicanus:

- With a body length of up to 15 mm (5/8 in), and sturdy legs, it is a middle-size to somewhat large spider of a generally brownish color.
- Patterns on the rear body segment, the abdomen, provide its most easily seen distinctive features. Two well separated, variably broken lines of pale dots or short streaks run parallel to one another on the top, with a broad, brown area between them. Unlike the body's front segment, the cephalothorax, there is no thin line running down the abdomen's top-center. The cephalothorax is interestingly patterned, but is similar to those of other species.
- Males and females are fairly similar.

Interestingly, species in the genus Sosippus, which belong to the wolf spider family Lycosidae, look and behave astonishingly similarly to species in the grass-spider family Agelenidae. It is noted that the funnel-web building behavior has evolved independently in several spider lineages, thus the similarities of Sosippus mexicanus with grass-spider species in a different family is an example of convergent evolution. Most wolf spiders do not spin webs.

== Distribution ==
Sosippus mexicanus occurs in southern Mexico, including the Yucatan Peninsula, and Guatemala.

== Habitat ==
Little or no literature describes the habitat of Sosippus mexicanus. However, images on this page show individuals encountered in disturbed, tropical dry forests in Mexico's Yucatan Peninsula, in June of different years at the end of extended dry seasons. At one location a well developed platform, or sheet, extended from the funnel entering a hole atop a decaying fence post, while the sheet spread over bushes, all about 1.5 m (4 ft 11 in) above the ground and along a cow trail. At the second location a funnel entered a space between loosely fitting rocks of a hut's exterior stone wall at a forest edge, with no sheet extending from the entrance funnel.

== Behavior ==
Little or no published literature exists describing the behavior of Sosippus mexicanus. However, notes on Sosippus texanus suggest Sosippus species producing funnel webs may follow the general funnel-web spider strategy for capturing prey practiced by many species: They quietly rest at the mouth of the web's funnel-like hole until prey disturbs the extended web sheet -- the silks of which are not adhesive -- and the spider rushes out, quickly captures the prey, and carries it back into the tubular hole, thus impeding the struggles of the victim.

== Taxonomy ==
In 1888 Eugène Simon formally described and named Sosippus mexicanus, noting that it was from someplace in Mexico. In the same publication, the genus Sosippus was erected, with the species Dolomedes oblongus designated as the type species for the genus. The next year, Simon transferred D.oblongus to the genus Lycosa, and established Sosippus mexicanus as the genus's type species, a status it still has.

=== Phylogeny ===
Based on physical features of their bodies and web-spinning habits, it is likely that species in the genus Sosippus cluster into two species groups, or clades. Sosippus mexicanus belongs to the clade which also includes, S. californicus, S. agalenoides, S. michoacanus and S. plutonus.

=== Etymology ===
The genus name Sosippus, for reasons unrecorded, is a Greek proper name for "saving the horses." In fact, in the early years of taxonomy sometimes bizarre, comical, fanciful and classical-sounding genus names were in fashion among some.

The species name mexicanus reflects the type specimen having been collected in Mexico.

== Gallery ==
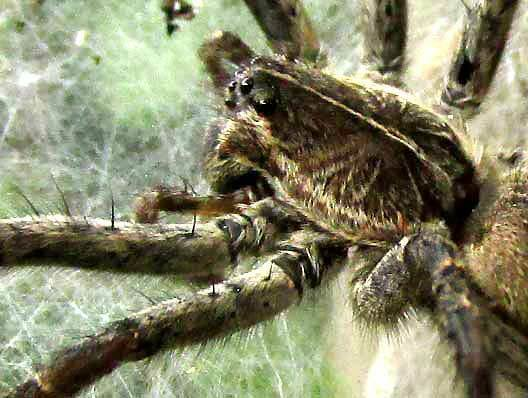
cephalothorax pattern and legs with stiff bristles

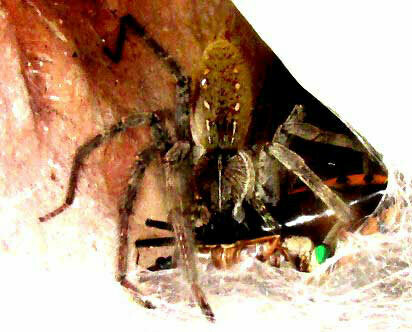
distinctive abdomen pattern

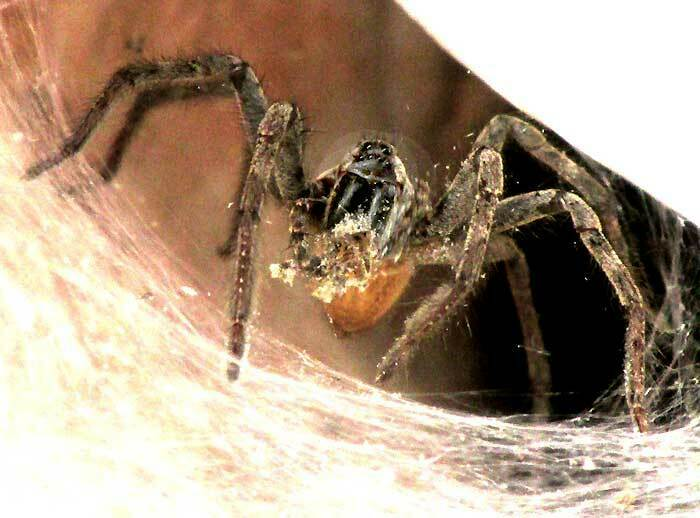
front view inside funnel tube showing "jaws", or chelicerae

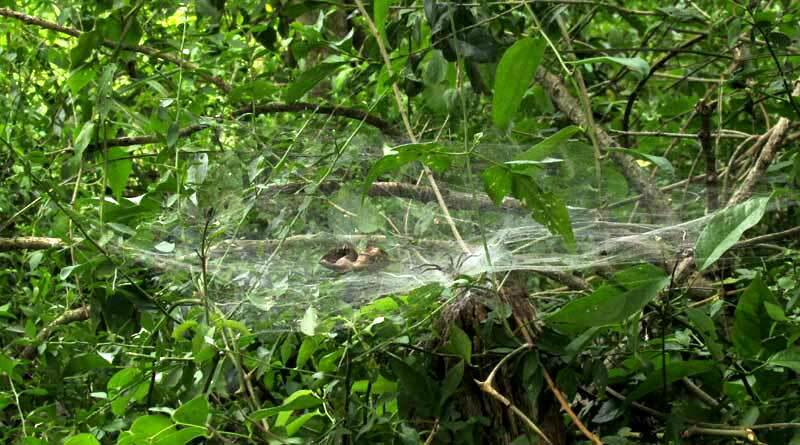
side view of web atop plants growing over decaying fence post

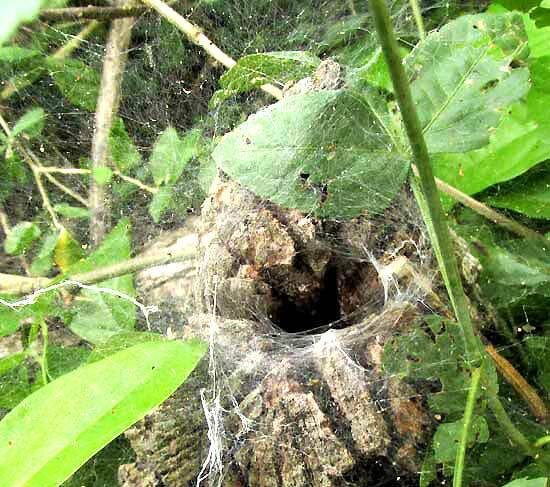
spider inside funnel-tube entering hole in decaying fence post top

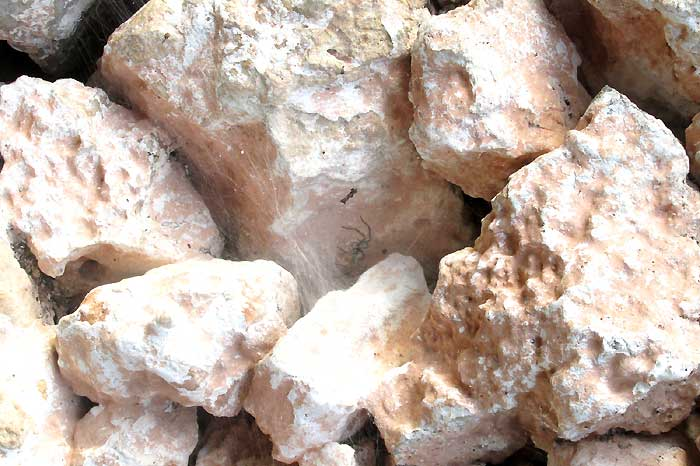
web funnel in hole between stacked rocks, with no sheet
