= Zeitgeist (film series) =

American documentary film series

Zeitgeist is a series of three documentary films released between 2007 and 2011 that promote a number of conspiracy theories, as well as proposals for broad social and economic changes. The films, Zeitgeist: The Movie (2007), Zeitgeist: Addendum (2008) and Zeitgeist: Moving Forward (2011) are all directed by Peter Joseph.

== Zeitgeist: The Movie ==
Zeitgeist: The Movie
- Directed by: Peter Joseph
- Written by: Peter Joseph
- Produced by: Peter Joseph
- Narrated by: Peter Joseph
- Edited by: Peter Joseph
- Music by: Peter Joseph
- Distributed by: GMP LLC
- Release date: June 18, 2007
- Running time: 122 minutes
- Country: United States
- Language: English

Zeitgeist: The Movie is a 2007 film by Peter Joseph presenting a number of conspiracy theories. The film assembles archival footage, animations, and narration. Released online on June 18, 2007, it soon received tens of millions of views on Google Video, YouTube, and Vimeo. According to Peter Joseph, the original Zeitgeist was not presented in a film format, but was a "performance piece consisting of a vaudevillian, multimedia style event using recorded music, live instruments, and video".

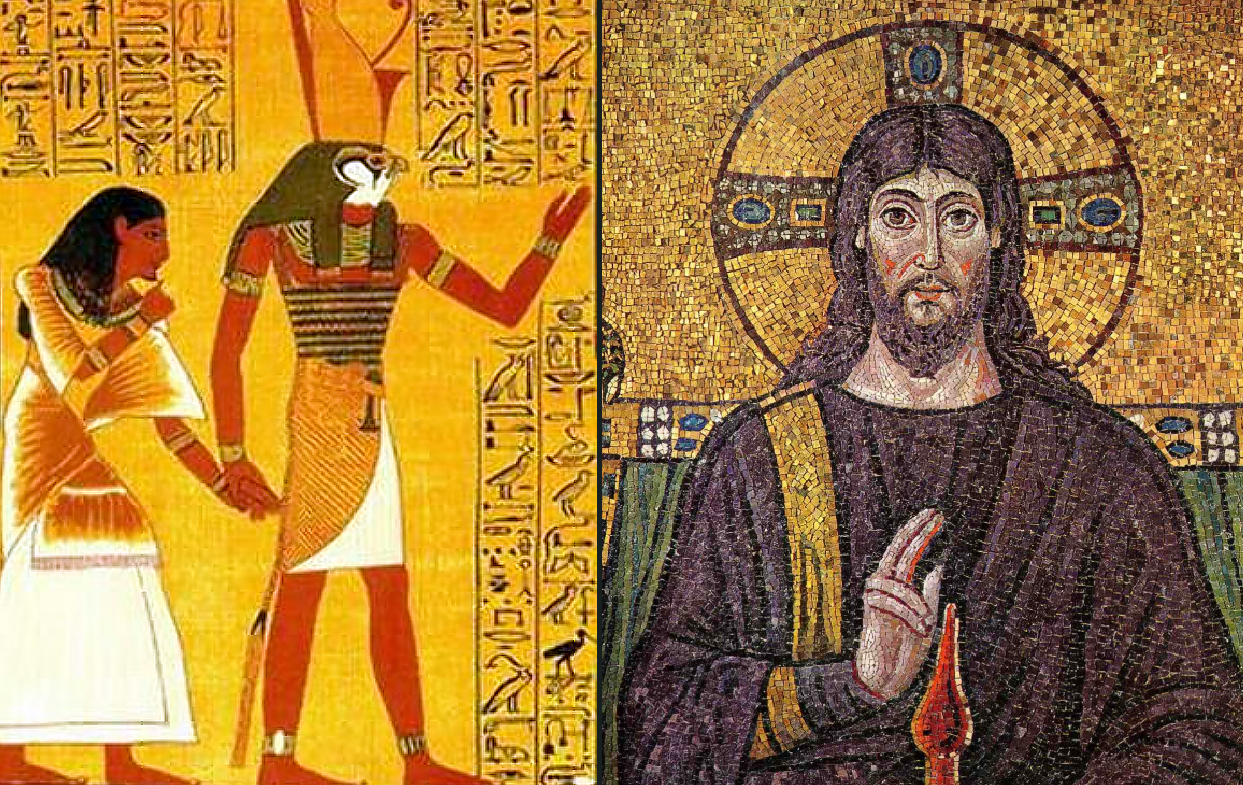
Horus left and Jesus right, both presented as "solar messiahs" in Zeitgeist: the Movie

=== Synopsis ===
The film's introduction features animations, footage of war, explosions, and the September 11 attacks and audio quotes from Chögyam Trungpa Rinpoche, Jordan Maxwell, and George Carlin.

Part I claims the Christian religion is mainly derived from other religions, astronomical assertions, astrological myths, and other traditions. The Christ myth theory, which disputes the historicity of Jesus, asserts that Jesus is a literary and astrological hybrid, nurtured by political forces and opportunists. Part I was influenced by the work of Acharya S.

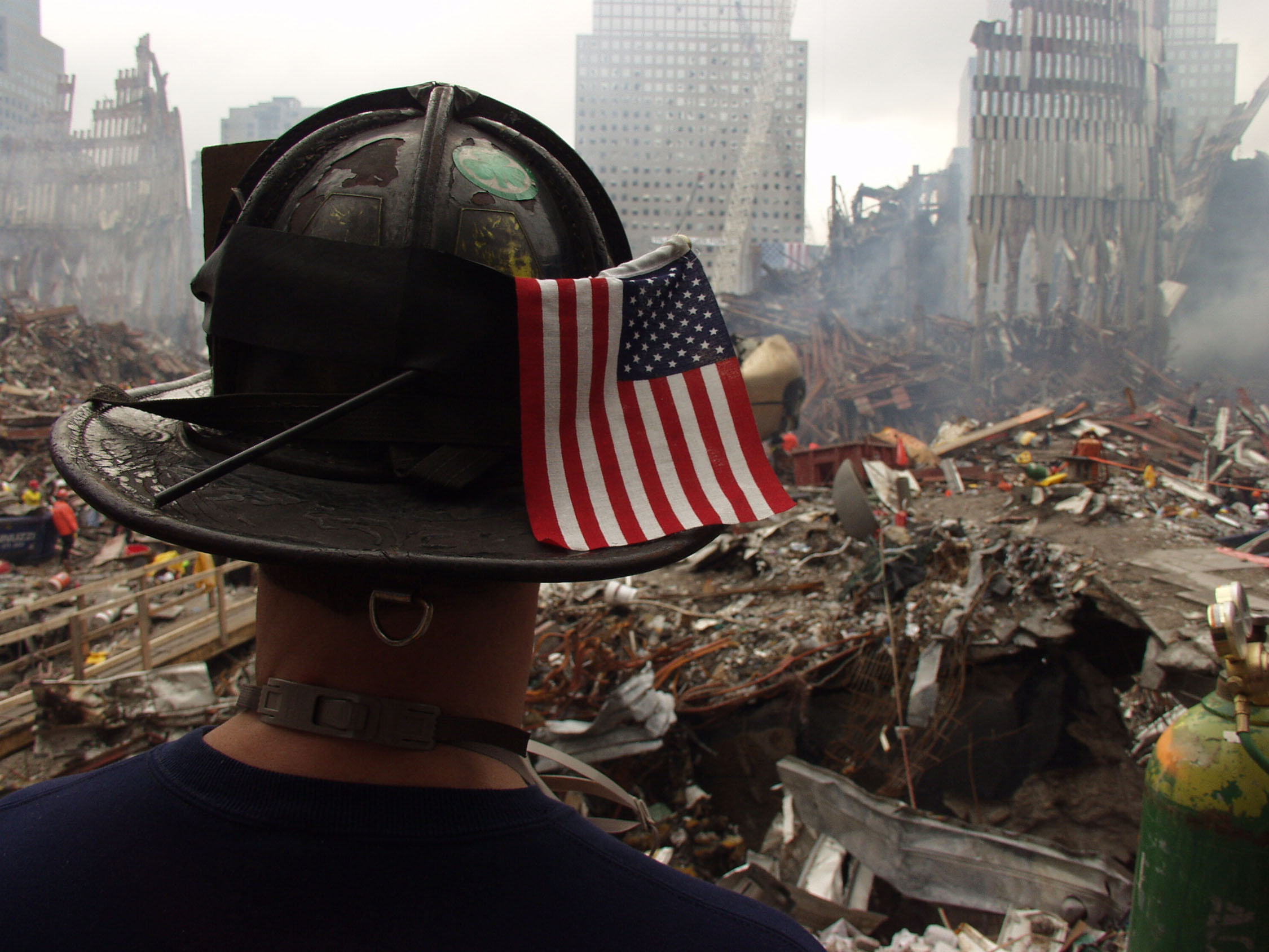
The 9/11 attacks are the subject of part II of Zeitgeist: the Movie.

Part II alleges that the September 11 attacks were either orchestrated or allowed to happen by elements within the United States government to generate mass fear, justify the war on terror, provide a pretext for the curtaillment of civil liberties, and produce economic gain. It asserts that the U.S. government had advance knowledge of the attacks, that the military deliberately allowed the planes to reach their targets, and that World Trade Center buildings 1, 2, and 7 underwent a controlled demolition.

Part III states that the Federal Reserve System is controlled by a small cabal of international bankers who conspire to create global calamities to enrich themselves. Three wars involving the United States during the twentieth century are highlighted as part of this alleged agenda, started by specifically engineered events, including the sinking of the RMS Lusitania, the attack on Pearl Harbor, and the Gulf of Tonkin Incident. The film asserts that such wars serve to sustain conflict in general and force the U.S. government to borrow money, thereby increasing the profits of the international bankers. The film also claims that the Federal Income Tax is illegal.

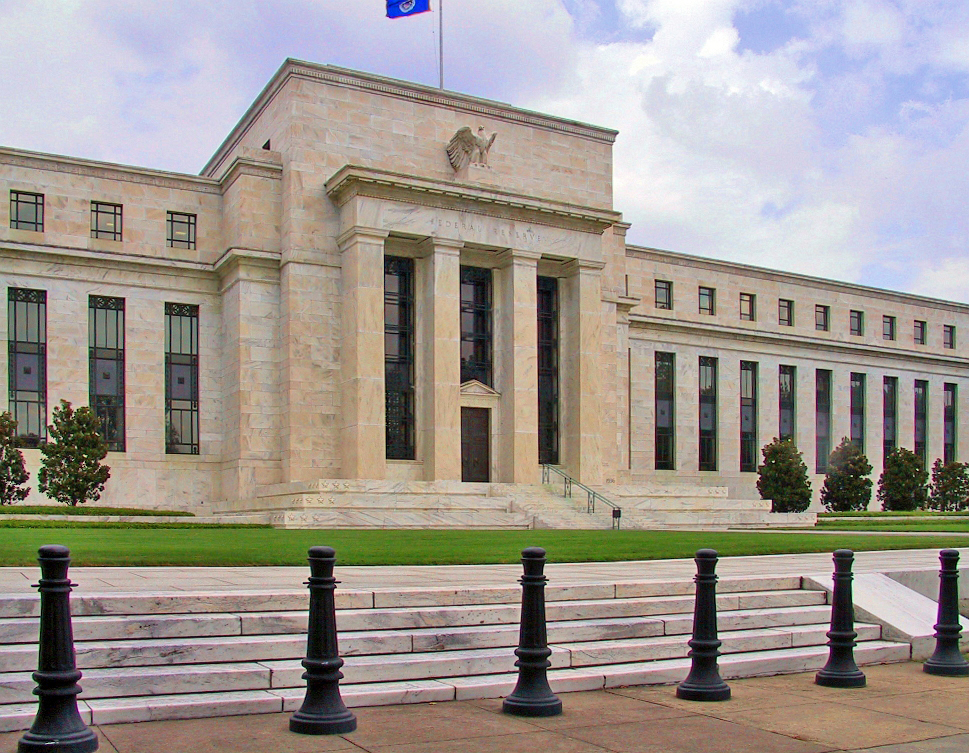
Zeitgeist: the Movie claims that the U.S. Government's income tax is unconstitutional.

Part III also alleges a secret agreement to merge the United States, Canada and Mexico into a North American Union as a step toward the creation of a single world government. The film speculates that under such a government, every human could be implanted with an RFID chip to monitor individual activity and suppress dissent.

=== Reception ===
The first film received almost universal condemnation from the media, though it also "attracted massive interest" from the public.

The newspaper The Arizona Republic described Zeitgeist: The Movie as "a bramble of conspiracy theories involving Sept. 11, the international monetary system, and Christianity" saying also that the movie trailer states that "there are people guiding your life and you don't even know it".

A review in The Irish Times wrote that "these are surreal perversions of genuine issues and debates, and they tarnish all criticism of faith, the Bush administration, and globalization—there are more than enough factual injustices in this world to be going around without having to invent fictional ones".

Ivor Tossell in The Globe and Mail cited it as an example of how modern conspiracy theories are promulgated, though he praised its effectiveness:

The film is an interesting object lesson on how conspiracy theories get to be so popular ... It's a driven, if uneven, piece of propaganda, a marvel of tight editing and fuzzy thinking. Its on-camera sources are mostly conspiracy theorists, co-mingled with selective eyewitness accounts, drawn from archival footage and often taken out of context. It derides the media as a pawn of the International Bankers, but produces media reports for credibility when convenient. The film ignores expert opinion, except the handful of experts who agree with it. And yet, it's compelling. It shamelessly ploughs forward, connecting dots with an earnest certainty that makes you want to give it an A for effort.

Filipe Feio, reflecting upon the film's Internet popularity in Diário de Notícias, stated that "[f]iction or not, Zeitgeist: The Movie threatens to become the champion of conspiracy theories of today".

Michael Shermer, founder of the Skeptics Society, mentioned Zeitgeist in an article in Scientific American on skepticism in the age of mass media and the postmodern belief in the relativism of truth. He argues that this belief, coupled with a "clicker culture of mass media," results in a multitude of various truth claims packaged in "infotainment units", in the form of films such as Zeitgeist and Loose Change.

Jane Chapman, a film producer and reader in media studies at the University of Lincoln, called Zeitgeist "a fast-paced assemblage of agitprop," an example of "unethical film-making". Chapman accused Peter Joseph of "implicit deception" through the use of standard film-making propaganda techniques. While parts of the film are, she says, "comically" self-defeating, the nature of "twisted evidence" and use of Madrid bomb footage to imply it is of the London bombings amount to "ethical abuse in sourcing". She finishes her analysis with the comment: "Thus, legitimate questions about what happened on 9/11, and about corruption in religious and financial organizations, are all undermined by the film's determined effort to maximize an emotional response at the expense of reasoned argument."

Alex Jones, American radio host, conspiracy theorist and executive producer of Loose Change, stated that film segments of Zeitgeist are taken directly from his documentary Terrorstorm, and that he supports "90 percent" of the film.

Skeptic magazine's Tim Callahan, criticizing the parts of the film on the origins of Christianity, wrote that "some of what it asserts is true. Unfortunately, this material is liberally—and sloppily—mixed with material that is only partially true and much that is plainly and simply bogus."

Chris Forbes, Senior lecturer in Ancient History of Macquarie University and member of the Synod of the Diocese of Sydney, severely criticized Part I of the film, stating that it has no basis in serious scholarship or ancient sources, and that it relies on amateur sources that recycle frivolous ideas from one another, commenting that "[i]t is extraordinary how many claims it makes which are simply not true". Similar conclusions were reached by Dr. Mark Foreman of Liberty University.

In Tablet magazine, journalist Michelle Goldberg criticized Zeitgeist: The Movie as being "steeped in far-right, isolationist, and covertly antisemitic conspiracy theories," writing that the film borrowed from the work of Eustace Mullins, Lyndon LaRouche, and radio host Alex Jones, and that it portrays a cabal of international bankers purportedly ruling the world. In an interview with TheMarker, Joseph said that while the film does mention bankers it does not seek to blame any individual or group of individuals. He argued they are merely a product of a socioeconomic system in need of change.

Chip Berlet wrote that the 9/11 conspiracy theories "are bait used to attract viewers from the 9/11 Truth movement and others who embrace conspiracist thinking to the idiosyncratic antireligion views of the videographer and the world of right-wing antisemitic theories of a global banking conspiracy".

Jay Kinney questioned the accuracy of its claims and the quality of its arguments, describing it as agitprop and propaganda. At times, according to Kinney, "Zeitgeist engages in willful confusion by showing TV screen shots of network or cable news with voice-overs from unidentified people not associated with the news programs. If one weren't paying close attention, the effect would be to confer the status and authority of TV news upon the words being spoken. Even when quotes or sound bites are attributed to a source, there's no way to tell if they are quoted correctly or in context."

=== Use in other media ===
In June 2013, Peter Joseph directed the music video for "God Is Dead?" by Black Sabbath, using extensive imagery from Zeitgeist: The Movie and its sequels.

== Zeitgeist: Addendum ==
Zeitgeist: Addendum
- Directed by: Peter Joseph
- Produced by: Peter Joseph
- Edited by: Peter Joseph
- Music by: Peter Joseph
- Distributed by: GMP LLC
- Release date: October 2008
- Running time: 123 min
- Country: United States
- Language: English

Zeitgeist: Addendum is a 2008 film produced and directed by Peter Joseph, and is a sequel to the 2007 film, Zeitgeist: The Movie. It premiered at the 5th Annual Artivist Film Festival in Los Angeles, California on October 2, 2008.

=== Synopsis ===
The film begins and ends with excerpts from a speech by Jiddu Krishnamurti. The remainder of the film is narrated by Peter Joseph and divided into four parts, which are prefaced by on-screen quotations from Krishnamurti, John Adams, Bernard Lietaer, and Thomas Paine, respectively.

Part I covers the process of fractional-reserve banking as illustrated in Modern Money Mechanics, by the Federal Reserve Bank of Chicago. The film suggests that society is manipulated into economic slavery through debt-based monetary policies by requiring individuals to submit for employment to pay off their debt.

Part II includes an interview with John Perkins, author of Confessions of an Economic Hitman, who says he was involved in the subjugation of Latin American economies by multinational corporations and the United States government, including involvement in the overthrow of Latin American heads of state. Perkins sees the US as a corporatocracy in which maximization of profits is the first priority.

Part III introduces futurist Jacque Fresco and The Venus Project and asserts a need to move away from current socioeconomic paradigms. Fresco states that capitalism perpetuates the conditions it claims to address, as problems are only solved if there is money to be made. The film looks at Fresco's proposal of a resource-based economy, which puts environmental friendliness, sustainability and abundance as fundamental societal goals. He goes on to discuss technology which he sees as the primary driver of human advancement, and he describes politics as being unable to solve any problems.

Part IV suggests that the primary reason for what the film sees as society's social values ("warfare, corruption, oppressive laws, social stratification, irrelevant superstitions, environmental destruction, and a despotic, socially indifferent, profit oriented ruling class") is a collective ignorance of "the emergent and symbiotic aspects of natural law". The film advocates the following actions for achieving social change: boycotting of the most powerful banks in the Federal Reserve System, the major news networks, the military, energy corporations, all political systems; and joining, and supporting The Zeitgeist Movement.

=== Reception ===
Zeitgeist: Addendum won the 2008 Artivist Film Festival's award for best feature ("Artivist Spirit" category).

Originally, the film was uploaded-released on Google Video. The current video posting on YouTube surpassed five million views by late 2013.

Alan Feuer of The New York Times noted that while the first film was famous for alleging that the attacks of September 11 were an inside job, the second, "was all but empty of such conspiratorial notions, directing its rhetoric and high production values toward posing a replacement for the evils of the banking system and a perilous economy of scarcity and debt".

== Zeitgeist: Moving Forward ==
Zeitgeist: Moving Forward is the third installment in Peter Joseph's Zeitgeist film series. The film premiered at the JACC Theater in Los Angeles on January 15, 2011, at the Artivist Film Festival, was released in theaters and online. As of November 2014, the film had over 23 million views on YouTube. The film is arranged in four parts, each containing interviews, narration and animated sequences.

Zeitgeist: Moving Forward
- Directed by: Peter Joseph
- Produced by: Peter Joseph
- Edited by: Peter Joseph
- Music by: Peter Joseph, Lili Haydn and Yes
- Distributed by: GMP LLC
- Release date: January 15, 2011
- Running time: 161 minutes
- Country: United States
- Language: English

=== Synopsis ===
The film begins with an animated sequence narrated by Jacque Fresco. He describes his adolescent life and his discontinuation of public education at the age of 14 and describes his early life influences.

Part I: Human Nature

Human behavior and the nature vs. nurture debate is discussed, which Robert Sapolsky refers to as a "false dichotomy." Disease, criminal activity, and addictions are also discussed. The overall conclusion of Part I is that social environment and cultural conditioning play a large part in shaping human behavior.

Part II: Social Pathology

John Locke and Adam Smith are discussed in regard to modern economics. The film critically questions the economic need for private property, money, and the inherent inequality between agents in the system. Also seen critically is the need for cyclical consumption to maintain market share, resulting in wasted resources and planned obsolescence. According to the movie, the current monetary system will result in default or hyperinflation at some future time.

Part III: Project Earth

As with Zeitgeist: Addendum, the film presents a "resource-based economy" as advocated by Jacque Fresco discussing how human civilization could start from a new beginning in relation to resource types, locations, quantities, to satisfy human demands; track the consumption and depletion of resources to regulate human demands and maintain the condition of the environment.

Part IV: Rise

The current worldwide situation is described as disastrous. A case is presented that pollution, deforestation, climate change, overpopulation, and warfare are all created and perpetuated by the socioeconomic system. Various poverty statistics are shown that suggest a progressive worsening of world culture.

The final scene of the film shows a partial view of Earth from space, followed by a sequence of superimposed statements; "This is your world", "This is our world", and "The revolution is now".

List of Interviewees

- Adrian Bowyer
- Colin J. Campbell
- Jacque Fresco
- Jeremy J. Gilbert
- James Gilligan
- Max Keiser
- Behrokh Khoshnevis
- Gabor Maté
- John McMurtry
- Roxanne Meadows
- Michael Ruppert
- Robert Sapolsky
- Richard Wilkinson

=== Reception ===
Zeitgeist: Moving Forward received "Best Political Documentary" in 2011 from the Action on Film International Film Festival.

A The Socialist Standard review said the film's use of animation and humor gave it a "well rounded feel", though it criticized the "shaky economic analysis" in the second part of the film, saying "Karl Marx had already undertaken a more scientific analysis", adding, "the analysis is at least on the right track". Regarding transition to the new system proposed in the film, the reviewer noted "there is no mention of how to get from here to there".

In an article, in Tablet magazine, Michelle Goldberg described the film as "silly enough that at times [she] suspected it was [a] sly satire about new-age techno-utopianism instead of an example of it". She describes the three Zeitgeist movies as "a series of three apocalyptic cult documentaries.

== Zeitgeist movement ==
Zeitgeist: The Movie (2007) started the chain of events leading to the formation of the Zeitgeist movement. The group advocates transition from the global money-based economic system to a post-scarcity economy or resource-based economy. VC Reporter's Shane Cohn summarized the movement's charter as: "Our greatest social problems are the direct results of our economic system". Joseph created a political movement that, according to The Daily Telegraph, dismisses historic religious concepts as misleading and embraces a version of sustainable ecological concepts and scientific administration of society. The group describes the current socioeconomic system as structurally corrupt and inefficient in the use of resources. Michelle Goldberg described the Zeitgeist movement as "the first Internet-based apocalyptic cult".

== See also ==
- 9/11 conspiracy theories
- Post-scarcity economy
- Technological utopianism
