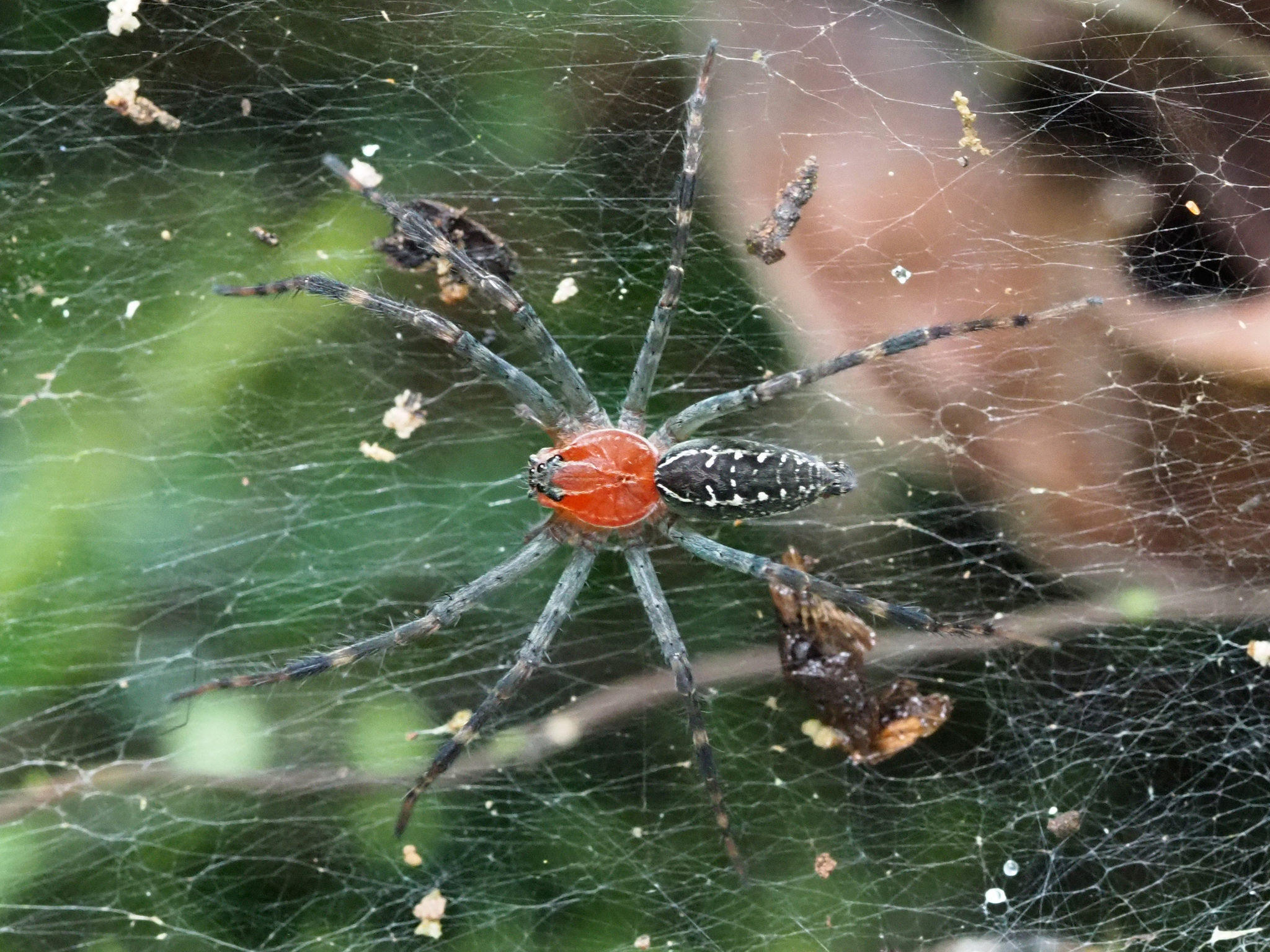
- female from Ecuador

Scientific classification
- Kingdom: Animalia
- Phylum: Arthropoda
- Subphylum: Chelicerata
- Class: Arachnida
- Order: Araneae
- Infraorder: Araneomorphae
- Family: Lycosidae
- Genus: Aglaoctenus
- Species: A. castaneus

Binomial name
- Aglaoctenus castaneus (Mello-Leitão, 1942)

Synonyms
- Porrima castanea Mello-Leitão, 1942; Porrimosa castanea (Mello-Leitão, 1942)

= Aglaoctenus castaneus =

Species of spider

Aglaoctenus castaneus is a species of wolf spider in the family Lycosidae. It was originally described as Porrima castanea by Mello-Leitão in 1942 and later transferred to the genus Aglaoctenus.

== Taxonomy ==
The species was originally described by Mello-Leitão in 1942 as Porrima castanea based on a female holotype from La Merced, San Martín, Peru. In 1960, Roewer transferred the species to the genus Porrimosa, and it remained in that genus until Santos & Brescovit transferred it to Aglaoctenus in 2001 during their revision of South American Aglaoctenus species. The male was first described by Capocasale in 1991.

The holotype specimen was destroyed in the fire that occurred at the Museu Nacional in Rio de Janeiro in 2018.

== Distribution ==
A. castaneus has been recorded from Ecuador, northern Peru, and northern, northeastern, and southeastern Brazil. Additional records suggest it may also occur in Argentina.

== Habitat ==
This species is recorded mainly from humid forests. Webs have been observed on palm species including Attalea sp. and Astrocaryum aculeatissimum in forest reserves in southeastern Brazil. On Ilha do Cardoso in southeastern Brazil, webs were found on bromeliads (Vriesea sp.) in restinga vegetation areas. Juveniles have been observed with webs in leaf litter in central Amazonian forests.

== Description ==
Males have a total length ranging from 11.9 to 20.1 mm, while females are larger at 14.2 to 24.0 mm in total length.

Males can be distinguished from the related species A. lagotis by their wider median apophysis and more conspicuous base of the cymbium in the male palp, as well as by leg-carapace ratios lying between 2.2 and 2.9.

The male carapace is orange with a red cephalic region and a clear orange median Y-shaped band. The abdomen is dark gray with a red anterior dorsal spot. Females have a brown carapace with a dark brown cephalic area that is laterally red, and a grayish abdomen with a dark folium pattern.

Female epigynes are characterized by a T-shaped septum that is shorter longitudinally and wider transversally compared to A. lagotis, with a more pronounced convex projection in the center.

Coloration varies considerably across the species' range, from red to dark, almost black. Amazonian specimens are usually darker, and males show a more conspicuous red spot on the abdomen compared to specimens from other localities.
