= Pastel QAnon =

Sub-community of QAnon followers

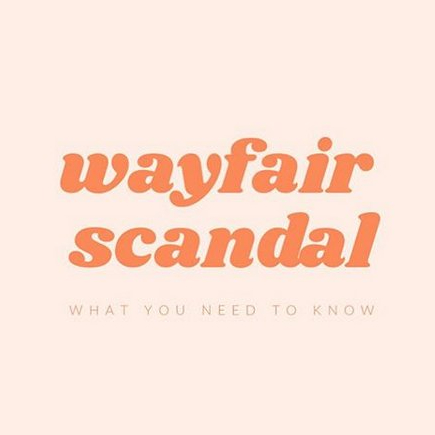
This image, in Pastel QAnon style, refers to false claims that furniture company Wayfair had secret arrangements to sell and ship victims of child trafficking.

Pastel QAnon is a collection of techniques and strategies that use "soft" and feminine aesthetics – most notably pastel colors – in order to attract women into the conspiracy theory of QAnon, often using mainstream social media platforms like Instagram, Facebook, Telegram and YouTube.

Pastel QAnon social media influencers focus on aspects of the conspiracy theory that tend to appeal to maternal instincts, such as the prevention of child sexual abuse and child sex trafficking, and utilize emotive and personable language. They are popular among wellness, yoga and New Age influencers.

The term "Pastel QAnon" was coined by Marc-André Argentino, a researcher at Concordia University in Canada.

== Background ==
QAnon is an ongoing, American far-right, political conspiracy theory and mass political movement centering around false claims made by an anonymous individual or individuals known as "Q" that a cabal of Satanic, cannibalistic sexual abusers of children operate a global child sex trafficking ring that conspired against U.S. President Donald Trump during his first term in office.

Although QAnon arose from mostly male-dominated online groups, women were and still represent a key demographic of QAnon supporters. According to political scientist Lorna Bracewell, right-wing movements that focus on child protection, such as QAnon, "speak to a distinctively feminine set of anxieties and fears to mobilize a distinctively feminine species of anger". Bracewell noted a similarity to the Tea Party movement, which attracted both local and national female leaders – most notably vice presidential nominee Sarah Palin. The QAnon movement appeals to the maternal notion of guardianship; for example, "mama grizzlies" who protect their children.

== Groups targeted ==
According to BuzzFeed News, lifestyle influencers began to spread pastel QAnon-related messages on Instagram as early as April 2020, largely using content relating to the COVID-19 pandemic, but were also one of the primary sources of misinformation. Pastel QAnon targets several existing communities and movements that are aimed at women.

The messages appealed to white, Republican-voting women, particularly suburban "soccer moms". This community is sometimes referred to as "QAmoms", a term followers use to refer to themselves. It has been associated with multilevel marketing groups, the wellness industry, and social media influencers, as well as a commercialisation of the QAnon movement in general, operating "within the concept of spectacle".

Many wellness and New Age groups mistrust mainstream institutions, authority, and pharmaceutical companies, and as such are susceptible to QAnon beliefs. Researchers have identified scandals in the food industry, concerns over additives in food and genetically modified organisms (GMOs), conflicting scientific advice on child-rearing and the U.S. opioid epidemic – all of which disproportionately affect women – a lack of investment in women's health and general gender discrimination in medicine as key drivers for some women to reject mainstream science in favour of conspirituality – conspiratorial thinking combined with New Age spirituality – and QAnon beliefs, particularly anti-vaccine conspiracies or rhetoric.

QAnon believers facilitated this popularisation by moving from encrypted pages and anonymous message boards to mainstream websites such as Facebook and Instagram. The negative impact of the COVID-19 pandemic on many businesses led leaders to contact social media influencers or use viral marketing to promote their services.

== Content ==
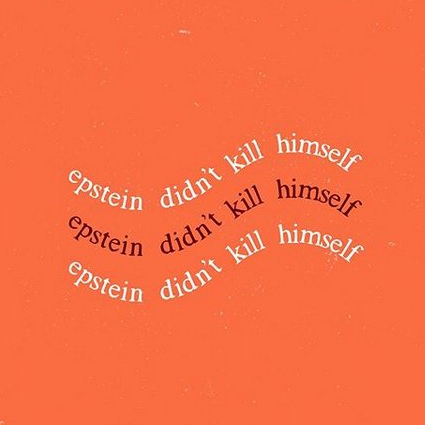
This image references conspiracy theories surrounding the death of Jeffrey Epstein. Epstein's involvement in a child sex-trafficking ring and subsequent suicide in jail have often been seen as a gateway into QAnon beliefs.

=== Gateway messaging ===
Pastel QAnon uses existing social media messages about child protection, child trafficking, health and other topics as a gateway into the movement, and frames them using familiar, inspirational language. This is often done in an anecdotal, informal style. The messages do not always identify themselves as being related to QAnon and posters often deny any knowledge of QAnon but spread the same conspiracy theories in ways that are framed for a female audience, such as #SavetheChildren campaigns, which purport to be about child sex-trafficking but contain other QAnon-related content.

Gateway messaging is also done to avoid the deletion of posts; explicit QAnon references are banned on many social media sites. The movement also uses private groups, and the technique of posting and then auto-deleting stories on Instagram to promote their claims, giving conspiracy spreaders semi-plausible deniability. People and groups pushing pastel QAnon messages often deny any knowledge of QAnon. The messages tend to use and expand upon the targeted groups' existing distrust and misunderstanding, positive reinforcement, and fears for children's safety and security that became heightened during the COVID-19 pandemic.

=== Aesthetics ===
Pastel QAnon uses feminine aesthetics, a pastel color palette, inspirational imagery, cute fonts, design language and phrases that are commonly used to market products and services aimed at women. These aesthetics include glitter; diluted colors; cursive fonts; illustrations and photographs of natural scenery, fashion, make-up and aspirational lifestyles; along with language in the form of spiritual and motivational quotations, in styles with which the targeted groups are familiar to make them attractive.

Becca Lewis, Stanford University researcher of online political subcultures, said:

We say you "fall down a rabbit hole". But it's not how the ecosystem actually works. So much of this content is being disseminated by super popular accounts with absolutely mainstream aesthetics ... If you're able to make this covetable, beautiful aesthetic and then attach these conspiracy theories to it, that normalizes the conspiracy theories in a very specific way that Instagram is particularly good for.

== See also ==
- Aestheticization of politics
- Gender advertisement
- Gender differences in social network service use
- Internet meme
- Priming
- Purplewashing
