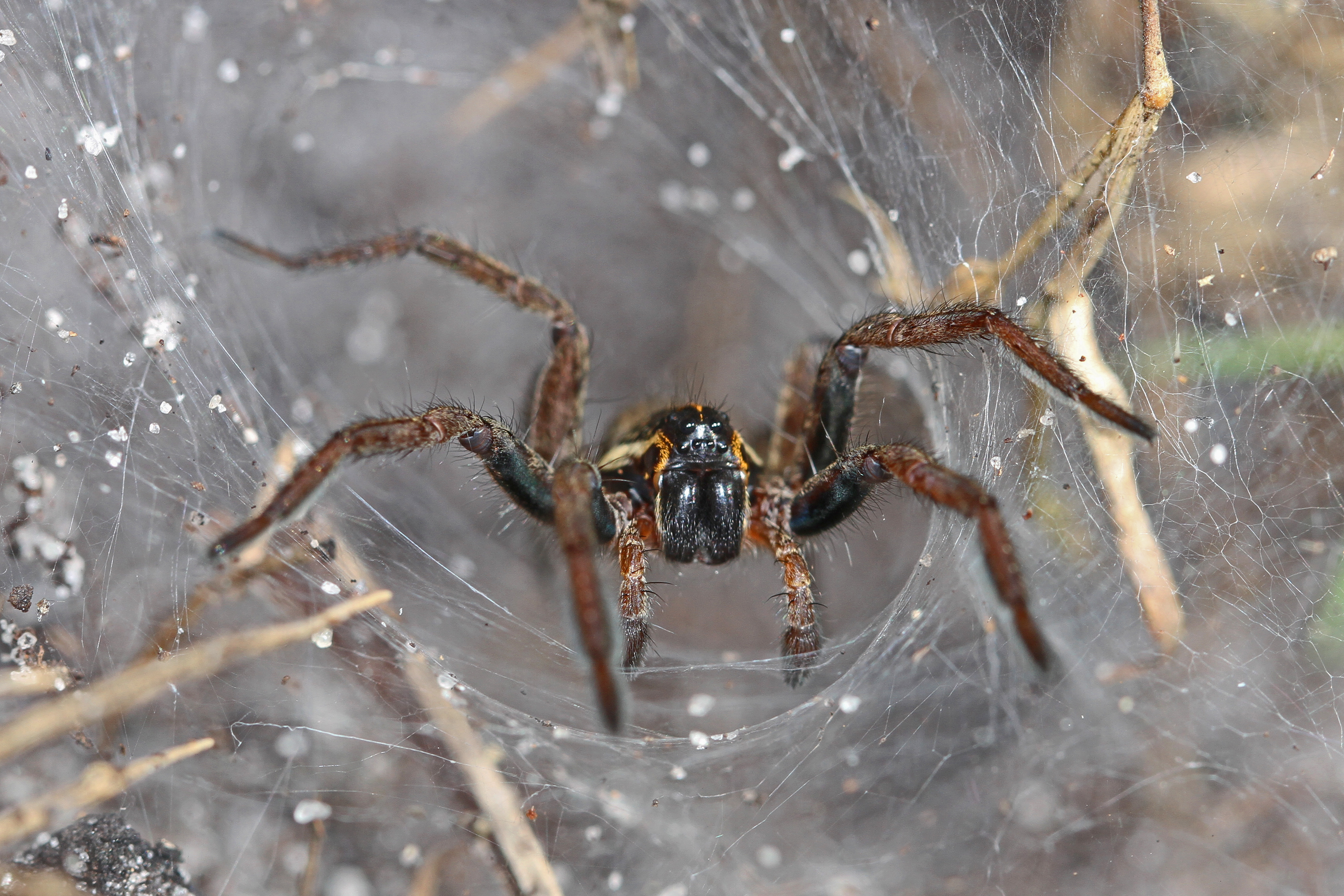

Scientific classification
- Kingdom: Animalia
- Phylum: Arthropoda
- Subphylum: Chelicerata
- Class: Arachnida
- Order: Araneae
- Infraorder: Araneomorphae
- Family: Lycosidae
- Genus: Sosippus
- Species: S. floridanus

Binomial name
- Sosippus floridanus Simon, 1898

= Sosippus floridanus =

Species of spider

Sosippus floridanus is a species of funnel-web wolf spider in the family Lycosidae. It is found in the United States, particularly Florida.

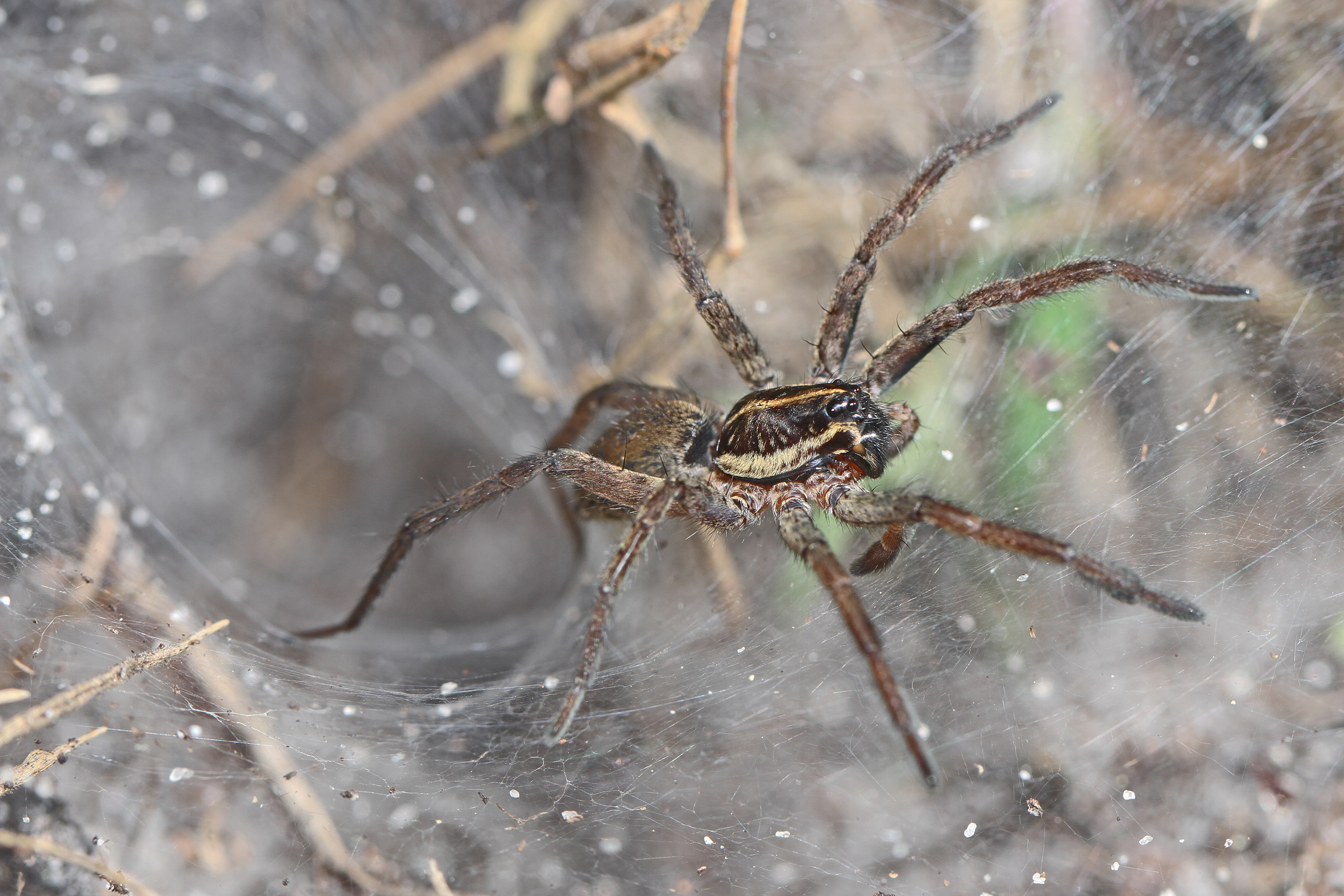
