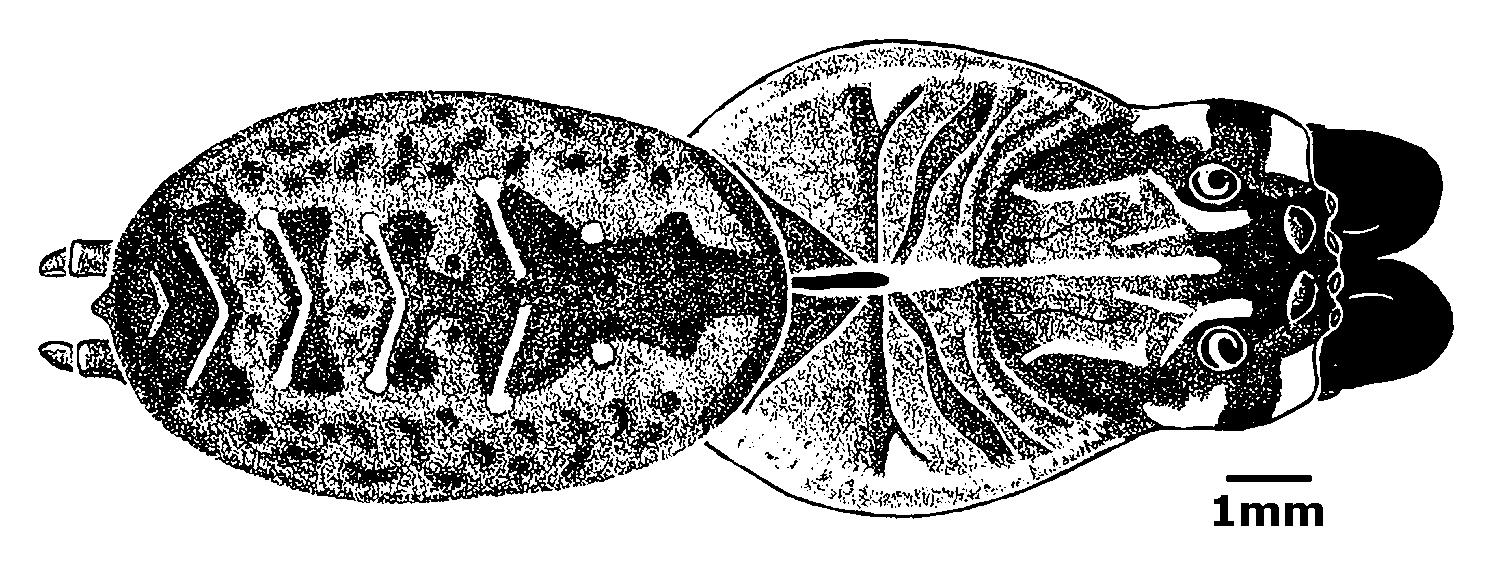
- Sosippus mimus (Lycosidae), female

Scientific classification
- Kingdom: Animalia
- Phylum: Arthropoda
- Subphylum: Chelicerata
- Class: Arachnida
- Order: Araneae
- Infraorder: Araneomorphae
- Family: Lycosidae
- Genus: Sosippus
- Species: S. mimus

Binomial name
- Sosippus mimus Chamberlin, 1924

= Sosippus mimus =

Species of spider

Sosippus mimus is a species of wolf spider in the family Lycosidae. It is found in the United States.
