= Christian conspiracy theories =

Role of Christian fundamentalism in several conspiracy theories

Since the early twentieth century there has been a significant overlap between Christian fundamentalism and millennialism in the United States and belief in false conspiracy theories, primarily the New World Order conspiracy theory, QAnon, and COVID-19 conspiracy theories, which are frequently perceived to represent fulfilment of Christian eschatology.

== History ==
=== Early 20th-century influences ===
Nesta Helen Webster, English author and reviver of conspiracy theories about the Illuminati in the early 20th century, has been called "one of the most influential conspiracy theorists of the twentieth century." Webster believed that the satanically aligned Illuminati were attempting to implement a plan for world domination. She believed this to be through the collaboration of Jews, who worked through secret societies; theologically liberal Christians in the Social Gospel movement; Freemasons; socialists; and communists, who all sought to undermine traditional values, the traditional family, and "national and imperial allegiances that stood in the way of popular acceptance of the Illuminati's universalist claims." Rather than through a purely secular lens, Finnish historian Markku Ruotsila views Webster's conspiracies through her upbringing in a fundamentalist Plymouth Brethren sect. The doctrine of dispensational premillennialism, which had been popularized by Plymouth Brethren theologian John Nelson Darby in the preceding decades, promoted interpretations of current world events as signs of the Antichrist. Issues such as Christian apostasy, societal decay, economic centralization, institutional corruption, and Zionism were seen as signs of the end times among premillennialists. Ruotsila argues that Webster—formed in this religious framework—created her own secular version of premillennialist eschatology: the Illuminati is thus a secular version of the Antichrist:

Webster came to depict world events as manifestations of a basic transcendental struggle between Christ and Satan. She forged out of the archetypal materials of her Christian heritage a highly appealing, prescriptive matrix of interpretations that placed contemporary radical movements in the context of premillennialist eschatology, dispensed with the original meanings of that eschatology, and put in their place her own version of the Satanic cast of the end-times. Doctrinally, the Illuminati theory that she constructed and successfully disseminated was in many ways a perversion of premillennialist Christian eschatology. Yet, on another level, it was deeply indebted both to the latter's categories and to its historical sequencing.

=== Later 20th century ===
Within the context of the later 20th century, scholar Billy Mann highlights American fundamentalist televangelists Jerry Falwell, a Baptist; and Pat Robertson, a charismatic evangelical. He links these figures to the development of an "explanatory conspiracy tradition" among the Christian right particularly since the 1980s. Mann argues that this framework posits a satanic conspiracy—often seen as enacted by humans—which is seen as the cause of a decline in Christian influence and values. Conversely, he states, there simultaneously exists a "benevolent conspiracy", God's ultimate plan, which will defeat the satanic conspiracy.

In the 1980s, Jerry Falwell linked Christian history with American history and Christian values with American values such as liberty, and societal changes with a loss of Christian influence. Mann situates this in the context of growing evangelical unease about the feminist, gay rights, and abortion rights movements, limits on school prayer, a rise in new religious movements such as the New Age movement, and other issues. Falwell explained leftism among college students as a communist conspiracy led by the devil, and gay rights activists as being motivated by demons rather than civil rights.

In his 1991 book The New World Order, Pat Robertson quoted Webster and promoted her views in what political science professor Martha F. Lee calls the "most influential appearance" of Webster's Illuminati conspiracy theory. The book claimed that a secret one-world government is being led by Freemasonry and the Illuminati, in collaboration with Jewish bankers. Robertson wrote:

Indeed, it may well be that men of goodwill like Woodrow Wilson, Jimmy Carter, and George Bush, who sincerely want a larger community of nations living at peace in our world, are in reality unknowingly and unwittingly carrying out the mission and mouthing the phrases of a tightly knit cabal whose goal is nothing less than a new order for the human race under the domination of Lucifer and his followers.

The QAnon conspiracy movement, which originated in 2017, found a loyal following among Christian fundamentalists particularly concerned with the search for signs of the end times. Frank Peretti's 1986 novel This Present Darkness, which depicted New Age practices, modern feminism, and secular education as part of a conspiracy to overthrow Christianity, has been criticized as being a possible influence on QAnon.

=== Adherence and links between fundamentalism and conspiracies ===
Adherence to conspiracy theories is particularly important in fundamentalist evangelical churches. Some pastors have explained this phenomenon with the distrust of expertise, which encourages citizens to challenge established authority figures. Others have described the mechanism of faith as "[mutating] into vulnerability to conspiracy theories" as well as apocalyptic narratives and Christian nationalism playing roles.

Biblical literalism is a key belief of Christian fundamentalism. A 2022 study concluded that rather than biblical literalism alone being the greatest factor behind conspiracy thinking, "it is the intersection of Christian nationalism and biblical literalism that best predicts conspiracy thinking". The 2021 Baylor University Religion Survey found that Christians who hold to biblical literalism were significantly more likely than other Americans to believe in Democratic-run pedophile rings, one of the tenets of QAnon; election denialism; and, to a lesser degree, that the COVID-19 vaccine should not be trusted. A 2022 study among Polish Roman Catholics found a positive correlation between religious fundamentalism and COVID-19 conspiracy beliefs. Another 2022 study on the link between fundamentalism and conspiracy beliefs found that "people with high religious fundamentalism are more likely to endorse conspiracy theories". More broadly, according to a 2018 survey by LifeWay Research for the Wheaton College Billy Graham Center, 46% of self-identified evangelicals and 52% of evangelicals by belief believe that mainstream media spreads fake news.

== Criticism ==
Outlets such as Christianity Today and Religion News Service have covered the movement's impact among congregations.

In 2017, Ed Stetzer wrote that Christians should repent of spreading false conspiracy theories and fake news online, which he says "directly violates Scripture's prohibition from bearing false witness against our neighbors". He argued that "The Seth Rich conspiracy theory is a textbook example of false witness... Without seriously defending their claims, conservative Christians across the country accused their neighbor of murder."

== See also ==
- Anti-intellectualism
- Barack Obama religion conspiracy theories
- Blood libel
- Conspirituality
- Christian Identity
- Fundamentalism
- Judeo-Masonic conspiracy theory
- Right-wing antiglobalism
- Vaccines and religion
  - Anti-vaccine activism

== Sources ==
- Fenster, Mark (1999). Conspiracy Theories: Secrecy and Power in American Culture. University of Minnesota Press. ISBN 978-0-8166-3242-8.
- Ruotsila, Markku (June 2004). "Mrs Webster's Religion: Conspiracist Extremism on the Christian Far Right". Patterns of Prejudice. 38 (2): 109–126. doi:10.1080/00313220410001692321.
- Wilcox, Clyde (1988). "The Christian Right in Twentieth Century America: Continuity and Change". The Review of Politics. 50 (4): 659–681. doi:10.1017/S0034670500041991. ISSN 0034-6705. JSTOR 1407358. S2CID 143220016.
