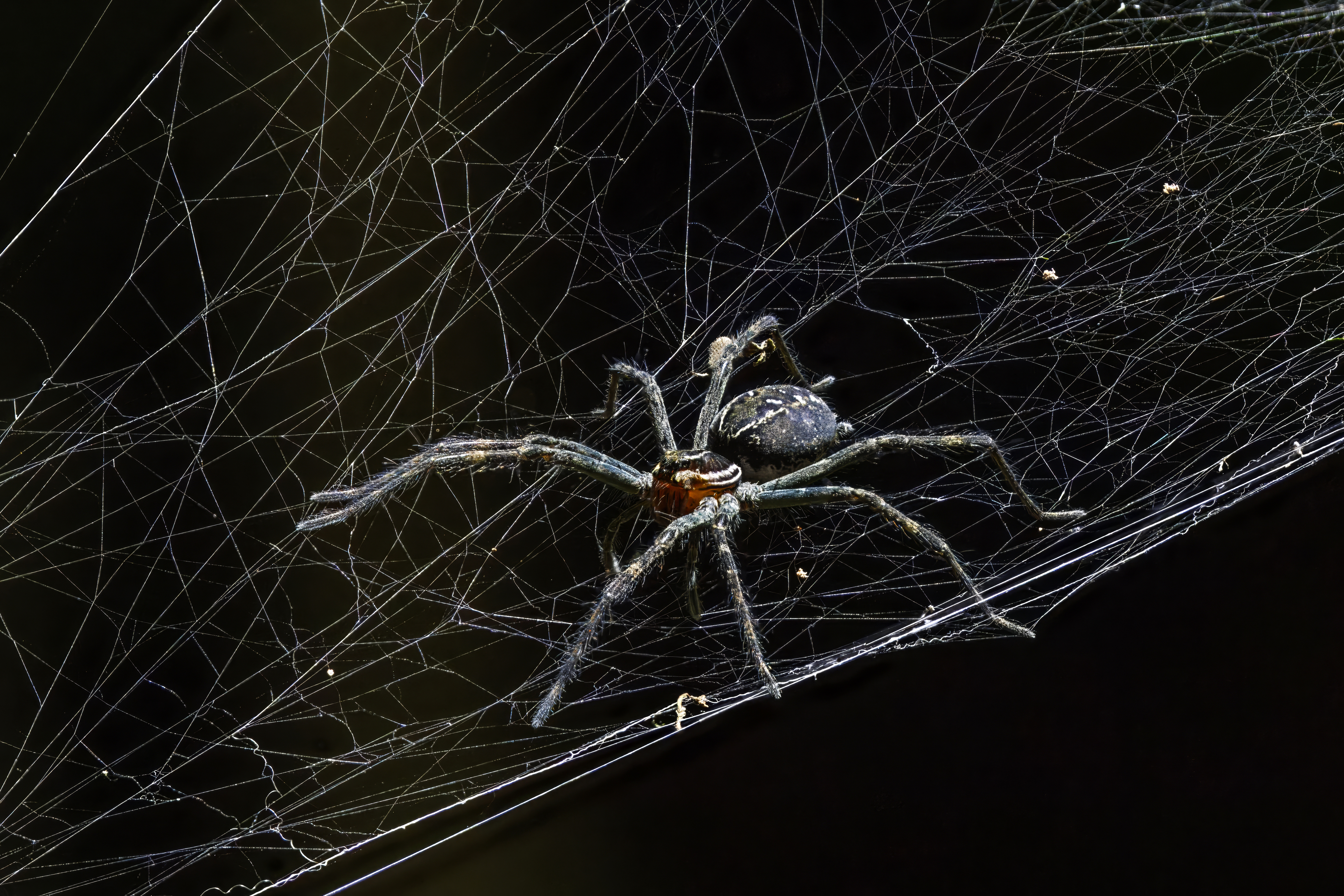
- A. castaneus, Ecuador

Scientific classification
- Kingdom: Animalia
- Phylum: Arthropoda
- Subphylum: Chelicerata
- Class: Arachnida
- Order: Araneae
- Infraorder: Araneomorphae
- Family: Lycosidae
- Genus: Aglaoctenus; Tullgren, 1905

Type species
- Ocyale lagotis Holmberg, 1876

Species
- Aglaoctenus castaneus (Mello-Leitão, 1942); Aglaoctenus lagotis (Holmberg, 1876); Aglaoctenus oblongus (C. L. Koch, 1847); Aglaoctenus puyen Piacentini, 2011; Aglaoctenus yacytata Piacentini, 2011

Synonyms
- Porrimosa; Porrimula

= Aglaoctenus =

Genus of spiders

Aglaoctenus is a genus of Funnel-web building wolf spiders first described by Albert Tullgren in 1905. As of April 2026, it contains only five species, all from South America.
