= Sex differences in social media use =

Differences between genders regarding use of social media

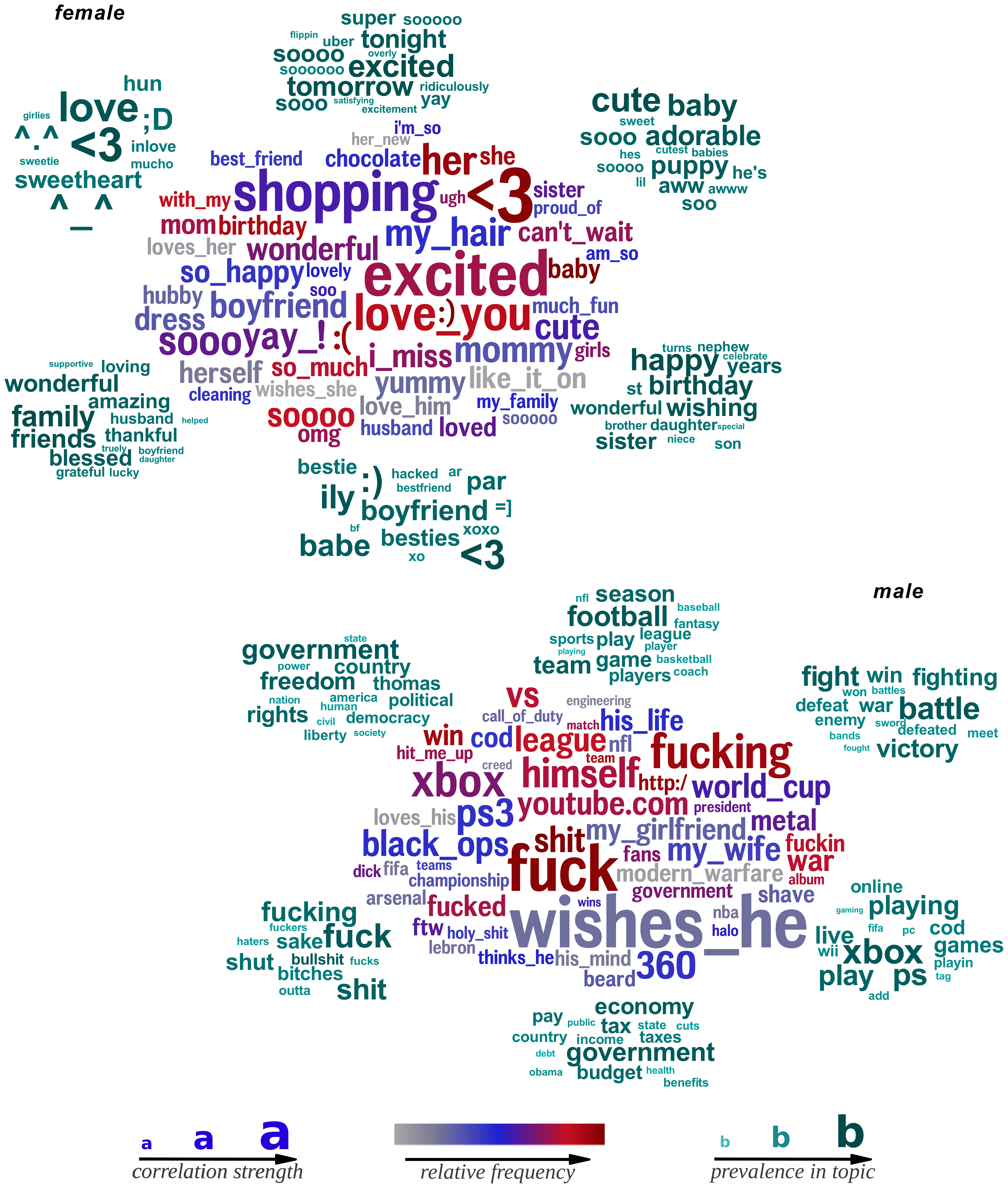
Words, phrases, and topics most highly distinguishing English-speaking females and males in social media in 2013

Men and women use social media in different ways and with different frequencies.

In general, several researchers have found that women tend to use social network services (SNSs) more than men and primarily to socialize.

== Differences ==
=== Predilection for usage ===
Many studies have found that women are more likely to use either specific SNSs such as Facebook or MySpace or SNSs in general. In 2015, 73% of online men and 80% of online women used social networking sites. The gap in gender differences has become less apparent in LinkedIn. In 2015 about 26 percent of online men and 25% of online women used the business-and employee-oriented networking site.

Researchers who have examined the gender of users of multiple SNSs have found contradictory results. Hargittai's groundbreaking 2007 study examining race, gender, and other differences between undergraduate college student users of SNSs found that women were not only more likely to have used SNSes than men but that they were also more likely to have used many different services, including Facebook, MySpace, and Friendster; these differences persisted in several models and analyses. Although she only surveyed students at one institution – the University of Illinois at Chicago – Hargittai selected that institution intentionally as "an ideal location for studies of how different kinds of people use online sites and services." In contrast, data collected by the Pew Internet & American Life Project found that men were more likely to have multiple SNS profiles. Although the sample sizes of the two surveys are comparable – 1,650 Internet users in the Pew survey compared with 1,060 in Hargittai's survey – the data from the Pew survey are newer and arguably more representative of the entire adult United States population.

Pinterest, Facebook, and Instagram attract more females. Picture sharing sites overall are very popular among women. Pinterest alone attracts three times as many female users than male. However, use of Pinterest by men has increased from 5% in 2012. Facebook attracts about 77% of women online. Instagram is also more likely to attract women. Men are more likely to participate in online forums like Reddit, Digg or Slashdot. One in five men claim to be a part of an online forum.

=== Uses ===
In general, women seem to use SNSs more to explicitly foster social connections. A study conducted by Pew research centers found that women were more avid users of social media. In November 2010, the gap between men and women was as high as 15%. Female participants in a multi-stage study conducted in 2007 to discover the motivations of Facebook users scored higher on scales for social connection and posting of photographs. Studies have also been conducted on the differences between females and males with regards to blogging. The Pew Research Center found that younger females are more likely to blog than males their own age, even males that are older than them. Similarly, in a study of blogs maintained in MySpace, women were found to be more likely to not only write blogs but also write about family, romantic relationships, friendships, and health in those blogs. A study of Swedish SNS users found that women were more likely to have expressions of friendship, specifically in the areas of (a) publishing photos of their friends, (b) specifically naming their best friends, and (c) writing poems to and about their friends. Women were also more likely to have expressions related to family relationships and romantic relationships. One of the key findings of this research is that those men who do have expressions of romantic relationships in their profile had expressions just as strong as the women. However, the researcher speculated that this may be in part due to a desire to publicly express heterosexual behaviors and mannerisms instead of merely expressing romantic feelings.

A large-scale study of gender differences in MySpace found that both men and women tended to have a majority of female Friends, and both men and women tended to have a majority of female "Top" Friends in the site. A later study found women to author disproportionately many (public) comments in MySpace, but an investigation into the role of emotion in public MySpace comments found that women both give and receive stronger positive emotion. It was hypothesised that women are simply more effective at using social networking sites because they are better able to harness positive emotion.

A study focused on the influence of gender and personality on individuals' use of online social networking websites such as Facebook, reported that men use social networking sites with the intention of forming new relationships, whereas, women use them more for relationship maintenance.

In addition to this, women are more likely to use Facebook or MySpace to compare themselves to others and also to search for information. Men, however, are more likely to look at other people's profiles with in the intention to find friends.

Women were less successful at actually finding new friends, but more successful at "maintaining existing relationships, making new relationships, using for academic purposes and following specific agenda". Similarly, men also self-reported this motivation "while women reported using them more for relationship maintenance".

=== Personality ===
OCEAN personality traits are known to systematically vary between human males and females.

In one study, the same women were more extraverted and agreeable, such as less neurotic while on social media than offline. Other studies associated neuroticism with female use of social media.

=== Privacy ===
Privacy has been the primary topic of many studies of SNS users, and many of these studies have found differences between male and female SNS users, although some studies have found results contradictory to those found in other studies.

Some researchers have found that women are more protective of their personal information and more likely to have private profiles. Other researchers have found that women are less likely to post some types of information. Acquisti and Gross found that women in their sample were less likely to reveal their sexual orientation, personal address, or cell phone number. This is similar to Pew Internet & American Life research of children users of SNSs that found that boys and girls presented different views of privacy and behaviors, with girls being more concerned about and restrictive of information such as city, town, last name, and cell phone number that could be used to locate them. At least one group of researchers has found that women are less likely to share information that "identifies them directly – last name, cell phone number, and address or home phone number," linking that resistance to women's greater concerns about "cyberstalking", "cyberbullying", and security problems.

Despite these concerns about privacy, researchers have found that women are more likely to maintain up-to-date photos of themselves. Further, Kolek and Saunders found in their sample of college student Facebook users that women were more likely to not only post a photograph of themselves in their profile but that they were more likely to have a publicly viewable Facebook account (a contradictory finding compared to many other studies), post photos, and post photo albums.

Women were more likely to have: (a) a publicly viewable Facebook account, (b) more photo albums, (c) more photos, (d) a photo of themselves as their profile picture, (e) positive references to alcohol, partying, or drugs, and (f) more positive references to or about the institution or institution-related activities. In general, women were more likely to disclose information about themselves in their Facebook profile, with the primary exception of sharing their telephone number. Similarly, female respondents to Strano's study were more likely to keep their profile photo recent and choose a photo that made them appear attractive, happy, and fun-loving. Citing several examples, Strano opined that there may also be a difference in how men and women Facebook users display and interpret profile photos depicting relationships.

Privacy has also been a concern for the SnapChat app, which allows you to send messages either text or photo or video which then disappear. One study has shown that security is not a major concern for the majority of users and that most do not use Snapchat to send sensitive content (although up to 25% may do so experimentally). As part of their research almost no statistically significant gender differences were found.

=== Cyberbullying ===
Past research carried out to investigate if there are any gender differences in cyber-bullying has found that boys commit more cyber verbal bullying, cyber forgery and more violence based on hidden identity or presenting themselves as other person.

=== Mansplaining ===
A 2021 article found that mansplaining could be seen more prominent online rather than offline, saying that "More than 50% of our respondents in the United States and 30% in the UK heard of the term. We find a discrepancy between the percentage of women to whom mansplaining happened (54%) and men who were accused of mansplaining (24%)." The authors analyzed information and conducted experiments to find if mansplaining could cause potential silence of female voices because they were afraid they would have to face sexist remarks.

=== In online discussion ===
A 2021 article by Emily Van Duyn, Cynthia Peacock, and Natalie Jomini Stroud, suggests that women's voices are typically only heard in smaller matters.

== Similarities ==
Although men and women users of SNSs exhibit different behavior and motivations, they share some similarities. For example, one study that examined the veracity of information shared on SNSs by college students found that men and women were as likely to "provide accurate and complete information about their birthday, schedule of classes, partner's name, AIM, or political views."

In contradiction to several of the studies described above that found that women are more likely to be SNS users, at least one very reputable study has found that men and women are equally likely to be SNS users. Data gathered in December 2008 by the Pew Internet & American Life Project showed that the SNS users in their sample were equally divided among men and women. As mentioned above, the data from the Pew survey are newer and arguably more representative of the entire adult United States population than the data in much of the previously described research.

== Gender roles and sexuality ==
Some studies have found that traditional gender roles are present in SNSs, with men in this study conforming to traditional views of masculinity and the women to traditional views of femininity. Qualitative work with college student SNS users by Martínez Alemán and Wartman and Managgo et al. have found similar results for both Facebook and MySpace users. Moreover, the work by Managgo et al. discovered not only traditional gender roles and images but sexualisation of female users of MySpace. Similarly, research into the impact of comments in the profile of a Facebook users on that user's perceived attractiveness revealed a "sexual double standard", wherein negative statements resulted in male profile owners being judged more attractive and female profile owners less attractive. Finally, at least one study has found that men and women SNS users both left textual clues about their gender.

Curiously, gay men were one of the earliest groups to join and use the early SNS Friendster.

== See also ==
- Identity (social science)
- Social aspects of television
- Social networking service
