= The Venus Project =

American nonprofit organization

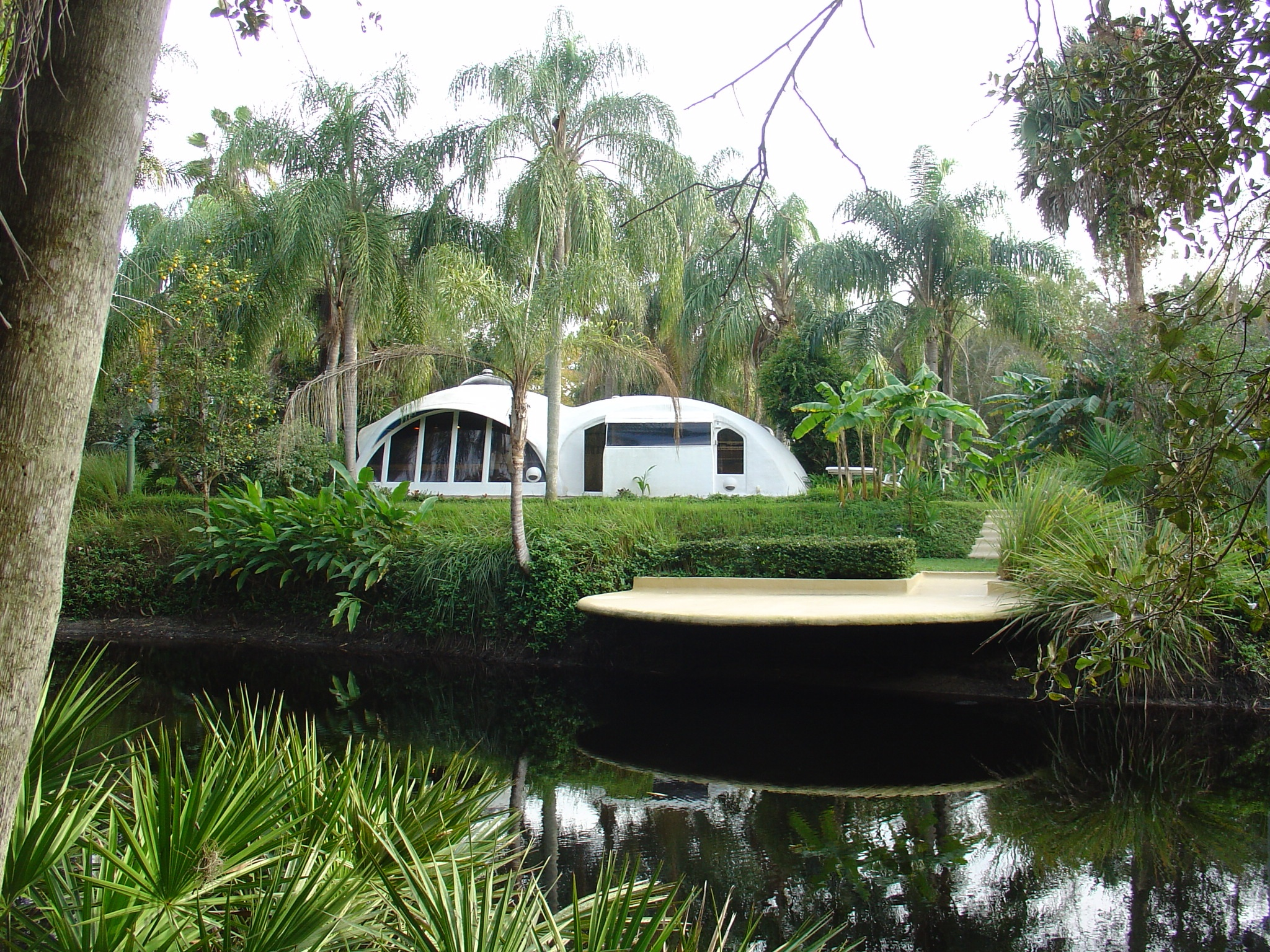
- Research centre of The Venus Project, Venus, Florida, United States
- Founded: April 6, 1985; 41 years ago
- Founder: Jacque Fresco
- Type: Not-for-profit
- Location: Venus, Florida
- Key people: Roxanne Meadows
- Website: https://www.thevenusproject.com/

The Venus Project is a 501(c) nonprofit organization founded by architect and social engineer Jacque Fresco. Fresco, along with his partner Roxanne Meadows, founded this project with a socioeconomic model to develop a resource-based economy for human beings utilizing technology.

== History ==
Before the Venus Project Fresco worked on the Project Americana from 1955 to 1959. The Americana project was mainly about environmental, traffic, and floodgate concerns.

In 1970, Fresco formed an organization, Sociocybereneering Inc, based on the idea of combining technology and energy conservation strategies. Later, Fresco and his partner Roxanne Meadows purchased 21 acres (8.5 ha) of farmland in Venus, Florida, an unincorporated community in southeastern Highlands County, Florida in order to conduct different types of research about their futuristic architectural design and city models. Fresco and Meadows began creating buildings and other infrastructure to actualize their idea of energy-efficient cities. According to The New York Times, initially, they supported the project by selling books and lecture videos. In 1980, Fresco, established a research center to experiment on resource-based economy and later named it "The Venus Project" after the town of Venus, Florida.

The project was prominently featured in Peter Joseph's 2009 film Zeitgeist: Addendum. Fresco and Joseph parted ways in 2011.

In 2010, Fresco and Meadows traveled to 20 countries to present the Venus Project.

In June 2012, Swedish documentary and fiction director Maja Borg screened her film Future My Love at the Edinburgh International Film Festival, featuring the work of Fresco and Meadows.

== See also ==
- The Zeitgeist Movement
- Resource-based economy
- Steady-state economy
- Green economy
- Renewable energy
- Egalitarianism
- Technocracy
- Technocracy Movement
- Utopian socialism
