= Venus, Florida =

- Unincorporated community
- Location within Florida Location within the United States
- Coordinates: 27°04′02″N 81°21′24″W
- Country: United States
- State: Florida
- County: Highlands County
- Elevation: 108 ft (33 m)
- Time zone: UTC-5 (Eastern (EST))
  - Summer (DST): UTC-4 (EDT)
- ZIP code: 33960
- Area code: 863
- GNIS feature ID: 294958

Venus is an unincorporated community in southeastern Highlands County, Florida, United States.

== Geography ==
Lake Placid is the nearest town to the north. Palmdale, another unincorporated community, is to the south. Hunting and fishing are popular recreations. Archbold Biological Station which includes natural Florida scrub is located here.

== Tropical Storm Debby ==
On June 24, 2012, Venus was struck by an EF2 tornado spawned by Tropical Storm Debby, resulting in one death and property damage.

== Businesses ==
Costa Delray Co., an indoor foliage plant greenhouse, is located here. Consolidated Citrus LP is located here. The Venus Project has its research center located here, and is derived from the name of the community.
