= Michelle Goldberg =

American journalist and author (born 1975)

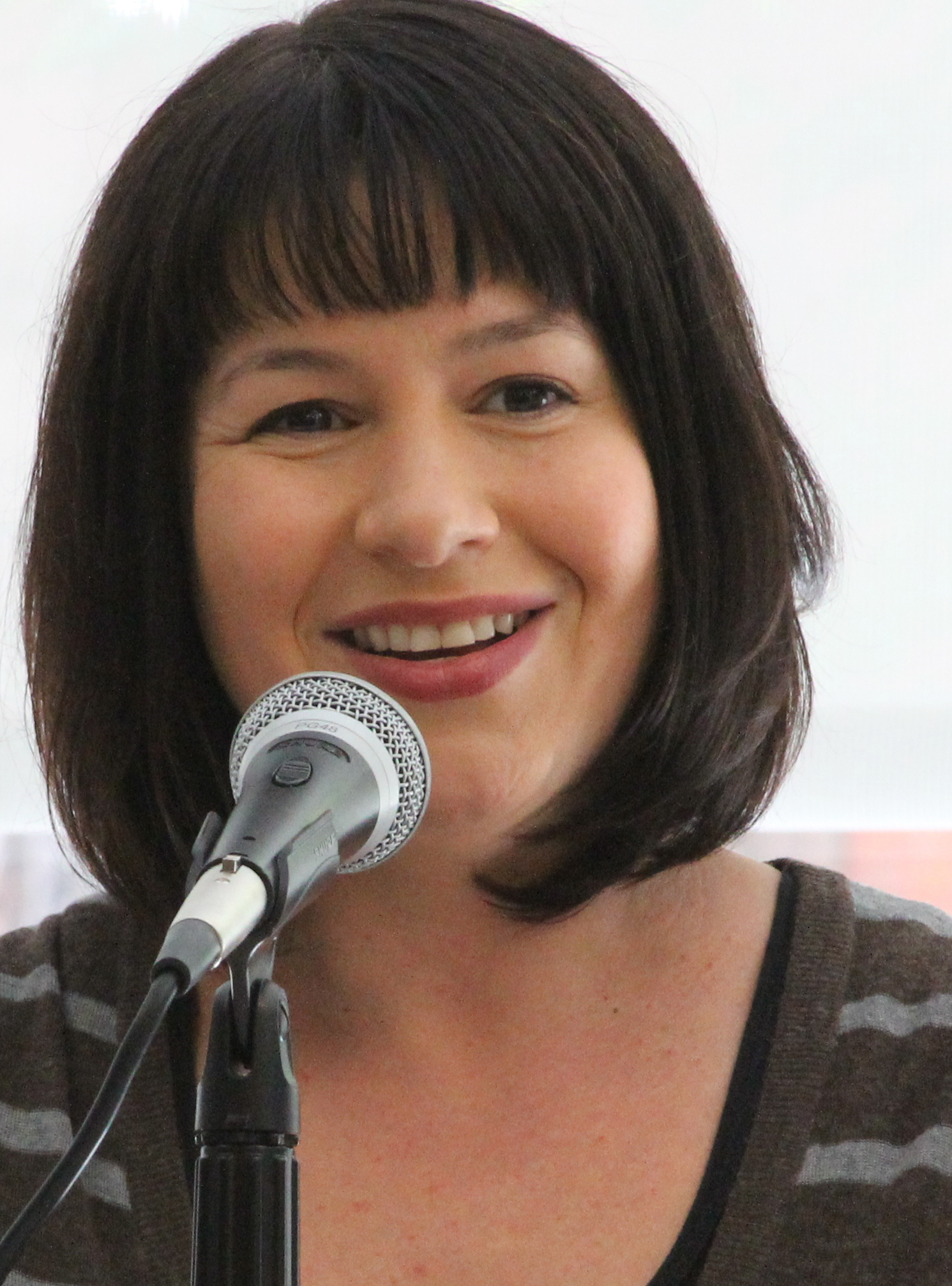
- Goldberg in 2012
- Born: 1975 (age 50–51); Buffalo, New York, U.S.
- Education: University at Buffalo (BA); University of California, Berkeley (MS)
- Occupations: Journalist, author
- Employer: The New York Times
- Website: Official website

Michelle Goldberg (born 1975) is an American journalist and author, and an op-ed columnist for The New York Times. She has been a senior correspondent for The American Prospect, a columnist for The Daily Beast and Slate, and a senior writer for The Nation. Her books are Kingdom Coming: The Rise of Christian Nationalism (2006); The Means of Reproduction: Sex, Power, and the Future of the World (2009); and The Goddess Pose: The Audacious Life of Indra Devi, the Woman Who Helped Bring Yoga to the West (2015).

== Early life and education ==
Goldberg was born in a Jewish family in Buffalo, New York, the daughter of Carolyn and Gerald Goldberg. Her father was managing editor of The Buffalo News and her mother was a math professor at Niagara County Community College. Goldberg received a B.A. from the State University of New York at Buffalo. She also holds an M.S. in journalism from the University of California Berkeley Graduate School of Journalism.

From her teens, she was active in abortion rights, taking a pregnant 13-year-old friend to an abortion clinic when she herself was 13, and defending abortion-clinics as a high-school senior.

In an opinion column titled, "Rant for Choice", published in the student newspaper at SUNY Buffalo in 1995, Goldberg wrote of on-campus anti-abortion demonstrators, " ... spit at [them]. Kick them in the head." Goldberg later told the Buffalo News, "Just like someone who says, 'I'm going to kill you,' I didn't mean it literally. I didn't call the article 'A Call to Arms'."

== Career ==
Beginning in 2002, Goldberg was for several years a senior writer for Salon. For approximately two years, through September 2015, she was senior contributing writer at The Nation.

She worked as a senior correspondent at The American Prospect and a columnist for The Daily Beast and Slate magazine. Her work has been published in The New Republic, Rolling Stone, Tablet and Glamour, and in The Guardian, The New York Times, The Washington Post, and other newspapers.

=== Books ===
Goldberg's first book, Kingdom Coming: The Rise of Christian Nationalism (2006), was a finalist for the 2007 New York Public Library's Helen Bernstein Book Award for Excellence in Journalism. In 2009, she published The Means of Reproduction: Sex, Power, and the Future of the World (2009), which is based on her own reporting about the state of women's reproductive rights across several continents, and explores what she terms the "international battle over reproductive rights."

=== Opinions and controversies ===
In 2012, Goldberg criticized a column written in USA Today by Ann Romney, wife of politician and businessman Mitt Romney. Romney wrote that there was "no crown more glorious" than the "crown of motherhood." Goldberg responded that such phrases reminded her of "pronatalist propaganda of World War II-era totalitarian regimes." Conservative media outlets criticized Goldberg for the remark; she subsequently said, "I should have realized that right-wingers were going to pretend that I was saying that Romney is akin to two of the century's most murderous tyrants. ... I'm truly sorry to have given the right a pretext for another tedious spasm of feigned outrage."

In 2013, in The Nation, Goldberg criticized the public and media reactions to a tweet by Justine Sacco, a woman who had been fired for tweeting, "Going to Africa. Hope I don’t get AIDS. Just kidding. I'm white!" Goldberg wrote: "Almost any of us could be vulnerable to a crowd-sourced inquisition."

In 2014, Goldberg wrote a piece for The New Yorker, titled "What is a Woman?," about the conflict between transgender women and some radical feminists. It was criticized by Jos Truitt in the Columbia Journalism Review on the basis of Goldberg's support for those feminists labelled as "trans-exclusionary radical feminists" (or "TERFs").

Goldberg endorsed Democratic candidate Hillary Clinton in the 2016 U.S. presidential election.

In the September 17, 2017, issue of The New York Times Book Review, Goldberg published a critical review of Vanessa Grigoriadis's study of college rape, Blurred Lines: Rethinking Sex, Power, and Consent on Campus; the review included errors that the publication later corrected. "Michelle is free to dislike my book," Grigoriadis wrote to Book Review editor Pamela Paul. "She is not free to make demonstrably false statements that not only damage my book but my reputation and credibility as a reporter." The Book Review correction read,

A review on Page 11 this weekend about "Blurred Lines: Rethinking Sex, Power and Consent on Campus", by Vanessa Grigoriadis, refers incorrectly to her reporting on the issues. She does in fact write about Department of Justice statistics that say college-age women are less likely than nonstudent women of the same age to be victims of sexual assault; it is not the case that Grigoriadis was unaware of the department's findings. In addition, the review describes incorrectly Grigoriadis's presentation of statistics from the Rape, Abuse and Incest National Network. She showed that there is disagreement over whether the data are sound; it is not the case that she gave the reader "no reason to believe" the statistics are wrong.

Regarding the corrected review, Goldberg stated on Twitter: "Two things are true here. I made a serious error. And one of the book's major claims about its subject isn't correct." She also said that she would "give a kidney and five years of my life" to retract her errors and that "This whole thing is turning into a round robin of fuckups." According to Vanity Fair, one Times source called the incident "a significant error," while another described the fallout as "humiliating".

=== New York Times columnist ===
The New York Times named Goldberg as an opinion columnist in September 2017.

"We have entered a period of minority rule," Goldberg declared in her debut column, "Tyranny of the Minority," published September 25, 2017. Goldberg argued that the U.S. Constitution's bias toward small states in the Electoral College and U.S. Senate, along with the gerrymandering of U.S. congressional districts and other factors, gives the Republican Party a structural advantage in national elections, allowing it to win control of the federal government without winning the most votes nationwide. "Twice in the last 17 years, Republicans have lost the popular vote but won the presidency, and it could happen again," she warned. "[President Donald] Trump's election has revealed many dark truths about this country. One of them is: We're a lot less democratic than we might think." Since then, many other political commentators have echoed Goldberg's critique.

Goldberg takes a positive view of immigration, she feels that "America is tearing itself apart as an embittered white conservative minority clings to power, terrified at being swamped by a new multiracial polyglot majority." She contends, though, that "American voters can do to white nationalists what they fear most. Show them they're being replaced."

Goldberg was a strong critic of Donald Trump's first presidency. In an October 17, 2020, column headlined, "Trump's Misogyny Might Finally Catch Up With Him", she wrote, "If Trump loses, it won't be just because enough women recognize him as a deranged bigot, it will because he blighted too many of their lives."

In July 2022, Goldberg argued that Joe Biden should not seek re-election, citing voters' concerns about his age, concluding: "Biden said, during the 2020 campaign, that he wanted to be a 'bridge' to a new generation of Democrats. Soon it will be time to cross it." In February 2023, she praised Biden's legislative accomplishments and for keeping campaign promises but reiterated her claim that he should not seek re-election: "The last time I wrote about Biden being too old, he was at a low moment in his presidency, with inflation soaring and his Build Back Better agenda stalled. Had he decided not to run for re-election then, it probably would have looked like an admission of failure. Now his political legacy seems more secure. He’ll cement it if he has the uncommon wisdom to know when the time has come for a valediction, not a relaunch."

In October 2026, Goldberg criticized the nationality and immigration politics of Donald Trump and Vice President JD Vance, which "escalated to naturalized citizens". She discussed the "targeting" of Congresswoman Ilhan Omar, because of "her politics and, even more, her ethnicity".

From 2018 to 2021, Goldberg appeared on the weekly podcast "The Argument," in which she and other columnists for the newspaper debated major national issues. Much of the ideological disagreement on the podcast arose between Goldberg and conservative columnist Ross Douthat, though in their final appearance together on the show in February 2021, each reflected on how the other's arguments had influenced them.

== Personal life ==
Goldberg lives in Cobble Hill, Brooklyn, New York, with her husband, Matthew Ipcar, in "a small apartment with small kids." She describes herself in Kingdom Coming as a secular Jew.

== Bibliography ==
- Kingdom Coming: The Rise of Christian Nationalism. New York: W. W. Norton. 2006.
- The Means of Reproduction: Sex, Power, and the Future of the World
- "What is a woman? The dispute between radical feminism and transgenderism". American Chronicles. The New Yorker. Vol. 90, no. 22. August 4, 2014. pp. 24–28.
- The Goddess Pose: The Audacious Life of Indra Devi, the Woman Who Helped Bring Yoga to the West. Knopf. 2015. ISBN 978-0307593511.

== See also ==
- New Yorkers in journalism
