= Overcome =

Overcome may refer to:

== Albums ==
- Overcome (All That Remains album), 2008
- Overcome (Alexandra Burke album), 2009

== Bands ==
- Overcome (band), a 1993 American metalcore band

== Songs ==
- "Overcome" (Tricky song), 1995
- "Overcome" (Live song), 2001
- "Overcome" (Creed song), 2009
- "Overcome" (Nothing But Thieves song), 2023
- "Overcome", a song by Wayne Marshall from the compilation album Diwali Riddim, 2002
- "Overcome", a song by Stephanie McIntosh from Tightrope, 2006
- "Overcome", a song by Jeremy Camp from We Cry Out: The Worship Project, 2010

== See also ==
- Overcomer
