= Moral Panic (album) =

Studio album by Nothing but Thieves
- Released: 23 October 2020
- Recorded: 2019–2020
- Genres: Alternative rock; indie rock; hard rock
- Length: 43:02
- Label: Sony UK
- Producers: Dominic Craik; Mike Crossey

Nothing but Thieves chronology
What Did You Think When You Made Me This Way? (2018)	Moral Panic (2020)	Dead Club City (2023)

Singles from Moral Panic
- 1. "Is Everybody Going Crazy?" Released: 18 March 2020; 2. "Real Love Song" Released: 23 June 2020; 3. "Unperson" Released: 28 August 2020; 4. "Impossible" Released: 14 September 2020; 5. "Phobia" Released: 16 October 2020

Professional ratings
Aggregate scores
Source	Rating
Metacritic	68/100
Review scores
Source	Rating
Clash	7/10
Gigwise	7/10 stars
Kerrang!	2/5
The Line of Best Fit	7.5/10
musicOMH	4/5 stars
Sputnikmusic	4.5/5

Moral Panic is the third studio album by English alternative rock band Nothing but Thieves. The album was released on 23 October 2020 through Sony Music UK. The album was produced by Mike Crossey, with band member Dominic Craik also producing five songs.

== Background ==
The band started composing the songs for the album in the early 2019. Although its release coincided with COVID-19 pandemic and a lot of related anxiety and tension in the society, the idea for the album (including its title and even the first single, Is Everybody Going Crazy?) came prior to that and took inspiration from various social issues in the world.

== Release and promotion ==
=== Singles ===
The album was preceded by five singles: lead single "Is Everybody Going Crazy?", released on 18 March 2020; "Real Love Song", released on 23 June 2020, "Unperson", released on 28 August 2020, "Impossible", released on 14 September 2020, and "Phobia", released on 16 October 2020.

=== Music videos ===
The music video for "Is Everybody Going Crazy?" premiered on the band's YouTube channel on 25 March 2020. The video was directed by Remi Laudat and co-produced by Juliette Larthe, Chris Murdoch and Yssis McKen. The video features the band in grey rainsuits performing in a dark room with cameras running at various angles and vantage points. On 10 August 2020, "Real Love Song" premiered on the band's YouTube and Vevo channels.

=== Moral Panic: The Complete Edition ===
On 29 October 2021, a deluxe version of the album was released comprising the 11 songs from the standard edition with the addition of the five songs from the band's Moral Panic II EP.

== Track listing ==
All songs written by Conor Mason, Joe Langridge-Brown and Dominic Craik, except tracks 4, 5, 7, 8 and 9 by Conor Mason, Joe Langridge-Brown, Dominic Craik, Jim Irvin and Julian Emery.

Moral Panic track listing
No.	Title	Length
1.	"Unperson"	3:24
2.	"Is Everybody Going Crazy?"	3:57
3.	"Moral Panic"	3:40
4.	"Real Love Song"	3:42
5.	"Phobia"	4:04
6.	"This Feels Like the End"	4:02
7.	"Free If We Want It"	3:52
8.	"Impossible"	4:08
9.	"There Was Sun"	4:03
10.	"Can You Afford to Be an Individual?"	3:56
11.	"Before We Drift Away"	4:14
Total length:		43:02

Moral Panic: The Complete Edition track listing
No.	Title	Length
1.	"Unperson"	3:24
2.	"Futureproof"	3:27
3.	"Is Everybody Going Crazy?"	3:57
4.	"Free If We Want It"	3:52
5.	"Miracle, Baby"	3:40
6.	"Impossible"	4:08
7.	"If I Were You"	3:28
8.	"There Was Sun"	4:08
9.	"Can You Afford to Be an Individual?"	3:56
10.	"Phobia"	4:04
11.	"Before We Drift Away"	4:14
12.	"Ce n'est Rien"	3:00
13.	"Moral Panic"	3:40
14.	"Real Love Song"	3:42
15.	"This Feels Like the End"	4:02
16.	"Your Blood"	4:50
Total length:		62:00

== Personnel ==
Credits adapted from Tidal.

Nothing but Thieves

- Philip Blake – bass guitar
- Dominic Craik – guitar, programming (all tracks); producer (1, 3–5, 11)
- Joe Langridge-Brown – guitar
- Conor Mason – vocals
- James Price – drums

Technical

- Mike Crossey – programming, producer, mixing engineer
- Robin Schmidt – mastering engineer
- Stephen Sesso – engineer

Artwork

- Steve Stacey – art direction, design
- Tom Andrew – photography

== Charts ==
Chart performance for Moral Panic
Chart (2020)	Peak position
Australian Albums (ARIA)	8
Austrian Albums (Ö3 Austria)	38
Belgian Albums (Ultratop Flanders)	21
Belgian Albums (Ultratop Wallonia)	70
Dutch Albums (Album Top 100)	5
German Albums (Offizielle Top 100)	35
Italian Albums (FIMI)	42
Polish Albums (ZPAV)	21
Swiss Albums (Schweizer Hitparade)	28
UK Albums (Official Charts)	3
US Heatseekers Albums (Billboard)	13
US Top Album Sales (Billboard)	79
US Top Current Album Sales (Billboard)	55

== Certifications ==
Certifications for Moral Panic
Region	Certification	Certified units/sales
United Kingdom (BPI)	Silver	60,000^{‡}
^{‡} Sales+streaming figures based on certification alone.
