= Welcome to the DCC =

Single by Nothing but Thieves

from the album Dead Club City
- Released: 15 March 2023
- Genre: Electronic rock; alternative rock
- Length: 3:17
- Label: Sony UK
- Songwriters: Joseph Langridge-Brown; Dominic Craik; Julian Emery; Jim Irvin; Conor Mason
- Producers: Dominic Craik; Jonathan Gilmore

Nothing but Thieves singles chronology
"Alone (Nothing But Thieves Remix)" (2021)	"Welcome to the DCC" (2023)	"Overcome" (2023)

Music video
- "Welcome to the DCC" on YouTube

"Welcome to the DCC" is a song recorded by English alternative rock band Nothing but Thieves from their fourth studio album, Dead Club City (2023). The song was released by Sony UK on 15 March 2023, as the lead single from the album. It peaked at number 29 on the Dutch Top 40, number 39 on the New Zealand Hot Singles chart and number 97 on the Official Charts.

It was later voted as the BBC Radio 1 Record of the Year for 2023 and made the Triple J Hottest 100 of 2023 at number 95.

The song was used as the intro song for the BBC Sport's coverage of the UEFA Euro 2024.

== Composition ==
During an interview with Radio X, Dominic Craik cited French electronic duo Justice as an influence in the creation of the song.

== Music video ==
The official music video for "Welcome to the DCC" was released on YouTube on 16 March 2023, directed by Jay Green.

== Track listing ==
Digital single
No.	Title	Length
1.	"Welcome to the DCC"	3:17

Fred Falke Remix
No.	Title	Length
1.	"Welcome to the DCC (Fred Falke Remix)"	4:29
2.	"Welcome to the DCC"	3:17

== Charts ==
Chart performance for "Welcome to the DCC"
Chart (2023)	Peak position
Netherlands (Dutch Top 40)	29
Italy Airplay (EarOne)	46
New Zealand Hot Singles (RMNZ)	39
San Marino (SMRTV Top 50)	49
UK Singles (OCC)	97

== Certifications ==
Certifications for "Welcome to the DCC"
Region	Certification	Certified units/sales
United Kingdom (BPI)	Silver	200,000^{‡}
^{‡} Sales+streaming figures based on certification alone.
