= Frames (Lee DeWyze album) =

Studio album by Lee DeWyze
- Released: August 20, 2013
- Genres: Folk; rock; pop
- Length: 43:48
- Label: Vanguard · 19
- Producers: Phil Allen; Lee DeWyze; Dr Zero; Julian Emery; Toby Gad; Drew Pearson; Rick Seibold, Matthew Wilder

Lee DeWyze chronology
Live It Up (2010)	Frames (2013)	Oil & Water (2016)

Singles from Frames
- 1. "Silver Lining" Released: April 25, 2013; 2. "Fight" Released: September 27, 2013

Frames is the fifth studio album by Lee DeWyze and the second album that DeWyze has released since he won the ninth season of American Idol. Thirteen tracks are included on the standard release, while acoustic versions of each song are available on the deluxe edition. DeWyze has six solo writing credits on the album and was a co-writer on all of the other songs, collaborating with Drew Pearson, Julian Emery, Justin Irvin, Shelly Fairchild, Rick Seibold, Matthew Wilder and Toby Gad. DeWyze also served as one of the album's producers, along with Pearson, Emery, Seibold, Wilder, Gad, Phil Allen and Dr Zero.

RCA Records dismissed DeWyze from his contract in 2011, due to the poor performance of his previous album, Live It Up. Undaunted by this setback, DeWyze set out to write music that would be more in line with his own vision, feeling that RCA had not understood him as an artist. Having previously released two independent albums, he went back to the folk rock sound of those albums, while also incorporating elements of pop, rockabilly and bluegrass. Attracting Vanguard Records with his new music, he signed with the label in early 2013 and was given creative freedom while working on Frames. The album was released on August 20, 2013, to positive reviews. It debuted at number 116 on the Billboard 200 Chart and at number 38 on the Top Rock Albums Chart.

"Silver Lining" was released as the lead single off of the album in April 2013, and a lyric video of the song was released in July. The second single, "Fight" was released in September 2013 and the music video was released in March 2014. Live in-studio videos have been made for both songs, as well as for "Stay Away" and "You Don't Know Me." Katie Stevens, who had competed on the ninth season of American Idol with DeWyze, accompanies him in the video for "Stay Away."

== Background ==
DeWyze, who had released two independent albums before winning the ninth season of American Idol, (Note: A third album of DeWyze's early independent recordings, called What Once Was, was released in 2012.) made his major-label debut with Live It Up in 2010. Released under RCA Records, it went on to become the worst-selling and lowest-charting debut album by a winner of the series. DeWyze has since expressed dissatisfaction with the album and said that winning American Idol did not turn out to be everything that he had thought it would be.

The limited schedule for Live It Up meant that DeWyze had to write his songs while on tour, which he found to be an overwhelming task. He has said this was one of the reasons for why the album did not live up to expectations and has also explained that there was pressure in trying to work with a large number of people, all of whom had their own ideas. He described the situation as "one of those too-many-cooks-in-the-kitchen kind of things". Although DeWyze felt that he and RCA were not thinking the same thing regarding his musical style, he still had high hopes about recording a second album with them and trying to take it in a different direction, but in September 2011, he was dismissed by the label. He said that this was disheartening and not what he would have expected, but that the decision was "fairly mutual" and followed a series of talks between him and RCA.

With 19 Recordings continuing to manage him, DeWyze chose to take an optimistic view of the situation and saw it as an opportunity to finally make the record that he had always wanted to make. Feeling that he had been misunderstood as an artist, he returned to a folk rock sound, more comparable to what had been present on his independent albums. Many people were surprised to hear him release music in this style and drew comparisons to Mumford & Sons, but DeWyze responded, "anyone can go back and listen to what I was doing when I was sixteen or seventeen years old, those are the kind of records that I was making then. I just wasn't able to put them out there like I am now."

Without any record deal in place, DeWyze began writing new songs and created demo versions for two of them: "Silver Lining" and "Fight." After showing them to potential labels, he turned down multiple offers that were only made because of his success on American Idol. In January 2013, he signed with Vanguard Records, feeling that the label "genuinely believed" in his music. He said, "that was a huge stepping-stone for me, because to have my music representing me in the proper way, the way I want it to, and have people understand it and react to it and connect to it like that has been the goal all along for me." Vanguard gave him a great amount of creative freedom and while DeWyze affirmed that he will always stand by Live It Up, calling it "a part of [his] musical journey," he has stated that Frames feels like his real debut.

== Writing and recording ==
All of the songs on Frames were either written or co-written by DeWyze. He wrote around twenty songs and then selected thirteen to include on the album. Drew Pearson co-wrote "Silver Lining", "Fight" and "Like I Do" with DeWyze. "Like I Do" was inspired by a friend of DeWyze's, who went through a similar situation. "Who Would've Known" was written for DeWyze's wife, Jonna Walsh, whom he married in July 2012. The song was played as she walked down the aisle at their wedding, and DeWyze also performed it himself during the reception. Walsh served as the inspiration for the song "Breathing In" as well, which DeWyze said is about how she is the anchor in his life and is able to bring him back to earth. Describing "Don't Be Afraid" as an "internal monologue", DeWyze has called it one of the most personal songs that he has ever written. Although he generally does not like to release songs about himself and originally did not plan on having this one on the album, he was swayed by his manager, who overheard him working on it in the studio. Acoustic versions of all thirteen songs were recorded and included on the deluxe edition of the album.

Frames was made over the course of a year and a half. Unlike on his previous album, Live It Up, DeWyze served as a producer on Frames. Toby Gad was the only producer and co-writer to collaborate with DeWyze on both albums. DeWyze described the co-writing process on Live It Up as having been like speed-dating, but said that on Frames it felt like "a full on collaboration." He said that the recording process felt organic and that there was no "pressure [on him] to make a 'certain' type of record." Free of this obligation, he chose not to confine himself to only writing folk rock songs and also included the pop songs "You Don't Know Me" and "The Ride," which have been compared to the music of the Beatles, "Fire Away," which has been described as a combination of roots music and rockabilly, and "Who Would've Known," which has been described as a combination of pop and bluegrass. DeWyze specifically set out to write Frames so that it would "flow as one," harkening back to the kind of albums that he had listened to as a kid with his dad. He said, "I wanted the vibe of the album as a whole to be cohesive. I wanted you to be able to sit down and listen to the whole thing and have a musical experience with it."

== Promotion ==
On July 11, 2012, over a year before the album's official release and several months before DeWyze signed with Vanguard Records, the song "Fight" was made available to download by giving a donation to The Heart Foundation's "One for the Heart" campaign. On November 3 of that year, DeWyze performed "Who Would've Known" on ABC 7 Chicago, in promotion of the Gateway for Cancer Research's annual Cures Gala charity event. About a year later, on November 26, 2013, a video was posted to CBS Chicago's website, in which DeWyze performed "Don't Be Afraid" and dedicated the song to those that had been affected by recent tornadoes in Illinois and Typhoon Haiyan in the Philippines. In the video, he encouraged people to aid in the relief effort by donating to Red Cross.

DeWyze's official website contains live in-studio video performances of the songs "Silver Lining," "Fight," "Stay Away" and "You Don't Know Me". The video for "Stay Away" features DeWyze's fellow American Idol season nine finalist Katie Stevens. Since July 11, 2013, the live in-studio version of "Fight" has been offered as a free MP3 download on DeWyze's official website. "Like I Do" was also offered as a free download for those who pre-ordered the album, and a behind-the-scenes video of this song was released on July 30. Eight days before the album's official release, all of its tracks were made available to listen to for free on Billboard.com. Several more free previews were made available over the following days, leading up the album's official release. Autographed CD booklets are included with albums ordered through Newbury Comics. On February 12, 2014, Pandora Radio uploaded a video of DeWyze singing "Frames" as a part of the website's "Whiteboard Sessions".

DeWyze performed "Silver Lining" on the American Idol season twelve Top 4 results episode, airing April 25, 2013. The song was made available to download digitally the same day, even though it would not be released to radio until June 10. DeWyze performed "Silver Lining" and "Fight" on AXS Live on August 8, 2013, and went on to premiere "Fight" as his second single on The Ellen DeGeneres Show on September 27.

In addition to these performances, several of the songs from Frames have received T.V. placements: "Fight" was featured in the third-season premiere episode of Hart of Dixie, "Who Says You Can't Go Home" (original airdate: October 7, 2013); "Don't Be Afraid" was featured in the first-season episode of Reign, "Left Behind" (original airdate: December 5, 2013); and "Fire Away" was featured in the second season episode of Nashville, "Just for What I Am" (original airdate: January 29, 2014). "Don't Be Afraid" was also featured in the Salt Lake City audition episode of American Idol's thirteenth season, which aired on January 29, 2014, and "The Ride" was licensed by NASCAR in September 2013.

== Touring ==
DeWyze held several shows with Toad the Wet Sprocket in July and August 2013. He toured regularly with the band throughout November, and he also toured with Serena Ryder during August. Other notable acts that DeWyze has held shows with include: Five for Fighting; Marie Miller; The Fray; Casey Abrams; The Devon Allman Band; Seth Glier; Val Bauer; Andy Suzuki & The Method; and Goh Nakamura.

On April 18, 2013, DeWyze served as the host and one of the judges for Cyclone Idol, an annual singing competition held by Iowa State University. Afterward, he performed a concert with Tristan Prettyman and Jillette Johnson. The same month, DeWyze performed as a part of Gettysburg College's Springfest. On June 1, he returned to his hometown of Chicago to participate in the Barefoot Wine Beach Rescue Project, an event sponsored with the Surfrider Foundation and aimed at spreading environmental awareness while cleaning the beaches, rivers, and lakes of the United States. DeWyze performed a concert during the event, which was held at Oak Street Beach. On July 6, he opened for Lifehouse at the Mondavi Festival in Oakville, California. His set at the concert was praised by L. Pierce Carson of the Napa Valley Register, who wrote that DeWyze's music "revealed a young man who wears his heart on his sleeve." Carson noted a similarity to Mumford & Sons, but felt that DeWyze succeeded in being his own distinct artist. On September 10, DeWyze performed on a Southwest Airlines airplane - flying from Dallas to Albuquerque, New Mexico - as a part of a promotional campaign called "Live at 35". This was for Live in the Vineyard, a three-day music festival in Napa Valley, California, which DeWyze would be participating in that November, and for which Southwest Airlines was a sponsor. DeWyze performed at the festival on November 2. He also performed at the inaugural Lauderdale Live Music Festival in Fort Lauderdale, Florida on December 6 and 7.

== Singles ==
The album's first single, "Silver Lining" was released digitally on April 25, 2013, and was released to radio on June 10, 2013. A lyric video of the song was released on July 22, 2013, using photographs submitted by fans.

DeWyze announced "Fight" as his second single on September 27, 2013, and a music video was released on March 17, 2014. The song entered Billboard's Adult Top 40 chart the week of January 24, 2014, and has so far peaked at number thirty-seven. It is his first song to enter the chart since "Sweet Serendipity".

== Reception ==
=== Critical reception ===
It's refreshing when an artist you may or may not have let slip from your memory, in the wake of the millions of other things on the screen, speaks up and reminds us he's in fact a human, and he plans to stick around a while. In the case of DeWyze, escaping the Idol box is still a battle, but his positivity, passion, and crazy work ethic have definitely pushed him to new places.

— Falyn Freyman of the New Times Broward-Palm Beach

Professional ratings
Review scores
Source	Rating
Allmusic	3/5 stars
People Magazine	3/4 stars

Frames has received positive reviews. Luke Bryan of the Chicago Sun-Times extolled the album, suggesting that those who had previously been detractors of DeWyze would have to take notice as "gorgeous lyrics tell one soulful story after another." Jeff Dodge of BuddyTV concurred that the album was likely to win over new fans and wrote, "It doesn't have the safe pop-y sounds of his debut; he's now with a record label that supports his musical efforts and he's able to showcase who he is as an artist." People Magazine gave the album three stars out of four and called it "a strong folk-pop effort." Gerry Galipault of The Sarasota Herald-Tribune gave the album a B+, writing that DeWyze is "more confident, lyrically and vocally." In her review for the Daily Reporter, Kate Padilla noted a maturity in DeWyze's voice that she did not feel had been present in his previous recordings. While specifically mentioning "Like I Do", "Frames", and "Silver Lining" as some of the album's standout tracks, she also wrote that she had already listened to the album as a whole "Too many times to count" since it had been released a week earlier. Lamenting the album's low debut on the Billboard Album 200 Chart, Mark Franklin of The York Dispatch's blog, Idol Chatter, wrote that "three of the first four songs on Frames are probably better than anything on [DeWyze's previous album] Live It Up". Joseph Brownell of David Atlanta wrote that the album contains "DeWyze's most personal tracks to date" and lives up to the expectations that his previous album had failed to meet, while freelance music journalist Kevin Oliver wrote on his blog that Frames "may just be the most surprisingly good album ever from a past [American Idol] winner". Stephen Thomas Erlewine of Allmusic gave the album three stars out of five, feeling that DeWyze had drawn inspiration from Mumford & Sons and The Lumineers to reinvent himself on many of the tracks. He wrote that DeWyze "eagerly throws himself into the fray, roaring these songs like a true believer", but felt that the album's highlights were actually the pop songs "You Don't Know Me" and "The Ride". In a review for Broken Records Magazine, Cindy Athanaseas called the album "a brilliant piece of work" by "an artist whose music needs to be heard." She praised DeWyze's voice, which she noted ranges from "soft & tender" to "rough & sultry" and wrote, "Each song tells an individual story, but the collection of songs paints a beautiful picture of life’s highs and lows...As I listened to the album, each song became my favorite … until I heard the next one."

=== Accolades ===
Laura B. Whitmore of Guitar World included Frames on her list of the top ten acoustic albums of 2013, writing, "DeWyze’s 2013 release solidifies his unquestionable musicianship and superior songwriting chops." For her, the album marked DeWyze's transition from being just an American Idol winner to an artist that she would be genuinely excited to follow.

Mark Franklin of The York Dispatch's blog Idol Chatter ranked Frames as the second best 2013 album by an American Idol alumni, writing, "Anyone who wrote Lee off after a lackluster post-Idol debut needs to listen to this album." He also ranked "Fight" as the second best 2013 song by an Idol alumni, writing that it "kicks off the album in brilliant fashion".

Carson Daly chose "Fight" as his "Pick of the Week" on October 12, 2013, for his website, The Daly Download. Daly serves as the host and producer of NBC's singing competition show The Voice. Christen Limon, one of the website's writers, described the choice by writing, "As if [DeWyze's] voice wasn’t already soothing, his guitar skills are that much more comforting and then you combine the two and never want his songs to end."

"Silver Lining" was included in Amazon.com's Best Songs of 2013 list.

=== Sales & chart performance ===
Frames made its debut at number 116 on the Billboard 200 chart and at number 38 on the Top Rock Albums chart. It sold 3,000 copies in its first week.

== Track listing ==
No.	Title	Writer(s)	Length
1.	"Fight"	Lee DeWyze, Drew Pearson	3:10
2.	"Fire Away"	DeWyze	2:42
3.	"Silver Lining"	DeWyze, Pearson	3:09
4.	"Frames"	DeWyze	4:22
5.	"Like I Do"	DeWyze, Pearson	2:51
6.	"Open Your Eyes"	DeWyze	3:52
7.	"You Don't Know Me"	DeWyze, Julian Emery, Justin Irvin	3:13
8.	"The Ride"	DeWyze	3:35
9.	"Don't Be Afraid"	DeWyze	3:04
10.	"Stay Away"	DeWyze, Shelly Fairchild, Rick Seibold	3:01
11.	"Little Did I Know"	DeWyze, Matthew Wilder	3:40
12.	"Who Would've Known"	DeWyze, Toby Gad	2:29
13.	"Breathing In"	DeWyze	4:40

Deluxe Edition
No.	Title	Writer(s)	Length
1.	"Fight" (Acoustic Version)	DeWyze, Pearson	3:27
2.	"Fire Away" (Acoustic Version)	DeWyze	2:47
3.	"Silver Lining" (Acoustic Version)	DeWyze, Pearson	3:42
4.	"Frames" (Acoustic Version)	DeWyze	4:30
5.	"Like I Do" (Acoustic Version)	DeWyze, Pearson	3:18
6.	"Open Your Eyes" (Acoustic Version)	DeWyze	3:40
7.	"You Don't Know Me" (Acoustic Version)	DeWyze, Emery, Irvin	3:15
8.	"The Ride" (Acoustic Version)	DeWyze	3:35
9.	"Don't Be Afraid" (Acoustic Version)	DeWyze	3:36
10.	"Stay Away" (Acoustic Version)	DeWyze, Fairchild, Seibold	3:32
11.	"Little Did I Know" (Acoustic Version)	DeWyze, Wilder	3:23
12.	"Who Would've Known" (Acoustic Version)	DeWyze, Gad	3:09
13.	"Breathing In" (Acoustic Version)	DeWyze	3:47

== Personnel ==
Credits adapted from AllMusic.

- Lee DeWyze – vocals, guitars (1–5, 7, 9, 11–13), drums (2, 4, 8–10), acoustic piano (4, 6, 8), Hammond B3 organ (4), bells (4), banjo (5, 9), acoustic guitar (10), cello (13)
- Drew Pearson – acoustic piano (1, 3), slide guitar (1, 3), bass (1, 3, 5), keyboards (5)
- Julian Emery – programming (7), electric guitar (7)
- Lincoln Cleary – keyboards (9)
- Rick Seibold – programming (10), guitars (10), banjo (10), percussion (10)
- Matthew Wilder – acoustic piano (11), programming (11), guitars (11), bass (11)
- Toby Gad – instrumentation (12), programming (12)
- Phil Allen – electric guitar (2), drums (2), bass (6, 9), MIDI production (6), guitars (8), mandolin (13)
- Matt Menefee – banjo (11)
- Jonathan Flaugher – bass (2, 4, 7), upright bass (12, 13), electric bass (13)
- Michael McGarity – drums (1, 3, 5)
- Marco Meneghin – drums (4, 7, 8)
- Jim Scott – tambourine (1), marxophone (3)
- Jordan Katz – trumpet (4, 13), horn arrangements (4, 13), banjo (12)
- Philip Dizack – trumpet (9), horn arrangements (9)
- Ross Holmes – fiddle (11)
- Paul Cartwright – fiddle (12, 13), string arrangements (12, 13)
- Jessi Collins – backing vocals (2, 10)
- Jim Irvin – backing vocals (7)

Acoustic tracks (Disc 2: 1-23)

- Lee DeWyze – vocals, acoustic guitar
- Marco Meneghin – percussion, backing vocals

=== Production ===
- Drew Pearson – producer (1, 3, 5)
- Phil Allen – producer (2, 4, 6, 8, 9, 13), mixing (2, 4, 6–10, 12, 13), additional production (7, 10, 12)
- Lee DeWyze – producer (2, 4, 6, 8, 9, 13), mixing (2, 4, 6–10, 12, 13), additional production (7, 10, 12)
- Dr Zero – producer (2, 4, 6, 8, 9, 13), mixing (4, 6, 8, 9, 13), additional production (7, 10, 12)
- Julian Emery – producer (7)
- Rick Seibold – producer (10)
- Matthew Wilder – producer (11), engineer (11), mixing (11)
- Toby Gad – producer (12)
- Jim Scott – mixing (1, 3, 5)
- Marina Chavez – photography
- Carrie Smith – art direction, package design
- Brett Radin – management

== Charts ==
Chart (2013)	Peak position
US Billboard 200	116
US Top Rock Albums	38
iTunes Alternative Albums Chart	12
