= American Idol 10th Anniversary – The Hits =

American Idol 10th Anniversary - The Hits

Greatest hits album by Various artists
- Released: March 15, 2011
- Recorded: 2001–2010
- Genre: Pop, pop rock, R&B, country
- Label: 19, RCA
- Producer: Max Martin, Dr. Luke, Midi Mafia, Mzmeriq, David Glass, Mark Bright, Andrew Frampton, Steve Kipner, Howard Benson, Shellback, The Underdogs

American Idol 10th Anniversary – The Hits is a compilation album that includes hits from several American Idol winners and former contestants, celebrating the tenth anniversary of the show. Clay Aiken, Daughtry, and Adam Lambert are the only artists included on the album who have not won the title. The album was released on March 15, 2011 via 19 Recordings and RCA Records. It debuted at number 136 on the Billboard 200, selling approximately 4,000 copies in its first week.

== Background ==
The album spotlights some of Idol's most successful contestants and multiple Billboard chart-topping singles. It was announced on February 6, 2011 online and was posted by some of the contestants whose songs are included on the album online via Facebook and Twitter.

== Track list ==
1. Kelly Clarkson - "Since U Been Gone"
2. Ruben Studdard - "Superstar"
3. Clay Aiken - "Invisible"
4. Fantasia Barrino – "When I See U"
5. Carrie Underwood – "Before He Cheats"
6. Taylor Hicks – "Takin' It to the Streets"
7. Daughtry – "Home"
8. Jordin Sparks (duet with Chris Brown) – "No Air"
9. David Cook – "Light On"
10. Kris Allen – "Live Like We're Dying"
11. Adam Lambert – "Whataya Want from Me"
12. Lee DeWyze – "Sweet Serendipity"
