= Graveyard Whistling (song) =

2014 song by Nothing but Thieves

Song by Nothing but Thieves

from the album Graveyard Whistling and Nothing but Thieves
- Released: 18 July 2014
- Genre: Alternative rock
- Length: 3:54
- Label: RCA
- Songwriters: Joseph Brown; Dominic Craik; Julian Emery; Jim Irvin; Conor Mason
- Producer: Emery

Music video
- "Graveyard Whistling" on YouTube

"Graveyard Whistling" is a song by English rock band Nothing but Thieves from their EP of the same name (2014) and self-titled debut studio album (2015). It was covered by American country music singer Morgan Wallen in 2024.

== Content ==
The song centers on the protagonist's angst from his skepticism toward religious beliefs—particularly in regard to death, mortality, and the existence of an afterlife—which are mainly explored in the first verse. He suggests in the chorus that one can reduce the power of their fears if they stop believing in their credibility. In the second verse, he admits he has been guilty of wrong deeds in the past, potentially implying that he is attempting to bury his own shame from these mistakes. The protagonist later questions whether he will find a sense of wonder in the afterlife, while describing the idea of trying to escape from a "cloud" of his misery.

== Critical reception ==
George O'Brien of The Line of Best Fit commented that the song possesses "a gently haunting hue", writing that it "builds out of its atmospheric, reverb-heavy, sparse beginnings into a warm subtly infectious chorus that nods to the likes of Radiohead, alt-J and Thirteen Senses". She described Conor Mason's vocals as using a "dulcet falsetto" and stated that he "pours with deep expression out above the wash of colourful layers. It's a vocal, and indeed a track, that begs to be returned to".

== Charts ==
Chart (2014)	Peak position
Belgium (Ultratop 50 Flanders)	50

== Morgan Wallen version ==
"Graveyard Whistling"

Promotional single by Morgan Wallen
- Released: October 17, 2025
- Genre: Country
- Length: 4:04
- Label: Big Loud; Mercury
- Songwriters: Joseph Brown; Dominic Craik; Julian Emery; Jim Irvin; Conor Mason
- Producer: Joey Moi

Audio video
- "Graveyard Whistling" on YouTube

American country singer Morgan Wallen recorded a cover of "Graveyard Whistling" and several other songs from Abbey Road Studios in December 2023. He released the live acoustic performances of these songs on March 3, 2024, as an EP titled Abbey Road Sessions exclusively on YouTube. "Graveyard Whistling" was released as an Amazon Music Original on June 27, 2025, before being released to other streaming services on October 17, 2025.

=== Critical reception ===
Maxim Mower of Holler wrote "Wallen sticks closely to the brooding, ominous instrumental of Nothing But Thieves' original, with the eerie, undulating guitar riff helping to build the picture of an eerie stroll through a misty graveyard at night. Aside from the wonderfully intricate 'I'm a Little Crazy' and the rousing 'Don't Think Jesus', there's a case to be made for 'Graveyard Whistling' being Wallen's most evocative vocal performance to date. He laces a weary, jaded feel into his enchanting drawl, before delivering a heart-rending crescendo during the anguished bridge".

=== Charts ===
Chart performance for "Graveyard Whistling"
Chart (2025)	Peak position
Canada Hot 100 (Billboard)	55
New Zealand Hot Singles (RMNZ)	9
US Billboard Hot 100	49
US Hot Country Songs (Billboard)	11
