= Trip Switch =

Single by Nothing but Thieves

from the album Nothing but Thieves
- Released: 18 June 2015
- Genre: Alternative rock
- Length: 3:01
- Label: RCA
- Songwriters: Joseph Brown; Dominic Craik; Julian Emery; Jim Irvin; Conor Mason
- Producer: Julian Emery

Nothing but Thieves singles chronology
"Hanging" (2015)	"Trip Switch" (2015)	"Honey Whiskey" (2015)

"Trip Switch" is a song by English alternative rock band Nothing but Thieves. It was produced by Julian Emery and was released as a single from the band's self-titled album on 18 June 2015. It topped the Billboard Alternative Songs chart in 2016. The song was also used in the video game FIFA 16.

== Background and composition ==
According to guitarist Joe Langridge-Brown, the lyrics are a comment on the modern world's reliance on digital communication and how lost people would be without Wi-Fi or electricity. Also, the song served as an inspiration for the album art.

== Music video ==
The official music video was released on 1 July 2015.

== Charts ==
=== Weekly charts ===
Weekly chart performance for "Trip Switch"
Chart (2015–2016)	Peak position
Australia (ARIA Hitseekers)	17
Canada Rock (Billboard)	2
Netherlands (Dutch Top 40)	35
UK Rock & Metal (Official Charts)	9
US Hot Rock & Alternative Songs (Billboard)	19
US Rock & Alternative Airplay (Billboard)	6

=== Year-end charts ===
Year-end chart performance for "Trip Switch"
Chart (2016)	Position
US Hot Rock Songs (Billboard)	52
US Rock Airplay (Billboard)	21

== Certifications ==
Certifications for "Trip Switch"
Region	Certification	Certified units/sales
Canada (Music Canada)	Gold	40,000^{‡}
United Kingdom (BPI)	Silver	200,000^{‡}
^{‡} Sales+streaming figures based on certification alone.
