= Rick Seibold =

American singer-songwriter

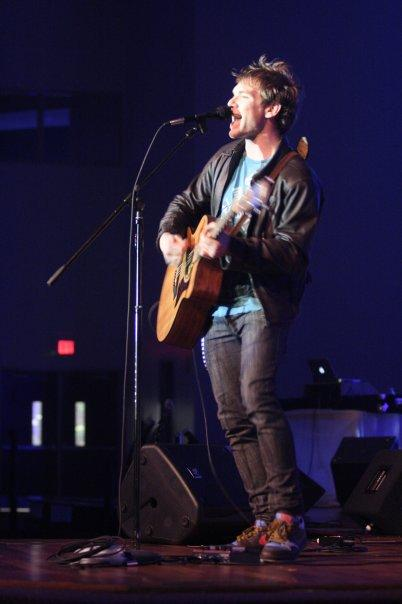
- Rick Seibold (2007)

Background information
- Born: April 16, 1983 (age 43)
- Origin: New Brunswick, New Jersey, U.S.
- Genres: Pop, Rock, Acoustic
- Occupations: Singer, songwriter, record producer
- Instruments: Guitar, piano
- Years active: 2007–present
- Website: rickseibold.com

Rick Seibold (/ˈsaɪboʊld/ SY-bohld; born April 16, 1983) is an American singer and songwriter from Wilmington, North Carolina, now based in Los Angeles. Seibold has received considerable recognition as an independent recording artist from his debut record "That's the Day". He has worked with artists such as Lee DeWyze, David Archuleta, Katelyn Tarver, Kat DeLuna, and Alex Lambert. As a producer, he has received two GMA Dove Awards for his work with Bethel Music.

== Background ==
Rick Seibold grew up on the East Coast in Wilmington, North Carolina. His music career began around age 10 when he appeared in the film The Road to Wellville as John Harvey Kellogg's son, played by Anthony Hopkins, singing "Silent Night". He started playing the guitar at age 15 and began writing songs soon after. As a wrestler, he garnered an invitation to the United States Olympic Training Center before attending the University of North Carolina at Chapel Hill as a varsity wrestler. In late 2004 Seibold began recording his first EP, That's the Day, eventually releasing it to the iTunes Store where it sold well without the support of a record company.

In June 2008, Seibold appeared in Southwest Airline's Spirit Magazine as part of a feature on Nashville-based songwriters. Later that year he interviewed and performed an early version of "Thrift Store Gypsy" for Seventeen Magazine.

He released his second EP, New York, in April 2009. It was recorded over a four-month period in late 2008 in Nashville, Tennessee, spending more than two months experimenting in his own studio in Nashville, Rick then with indie producer Cason Cooley to help finish the record.

On November 24, 2009, he released a Christmas single, "Why Won't It Snow Here", to iTunes. It was remastered and released again on iTunes in late 2013. He also frequently appeared as a house guest of Justin Gaston in the 2010 web-based If I Can Dream serioes. Many of his songs have appeared on television and film. The song, "My Best, was included on MTV's The Challenge in March 2012.

He launched a Kickstarter campaign to raise funding for Summertime Tonight. The set of seven songs was written and recorded in Los Angeles, California, over a three-year period and was released on October 1, 2013. He also released a documentary, Beautiful World, later that month about the recording process. It was shot over a two-year period while living and touring out of Los Angeles, California. In 2013 he wrote and produced the song "Stay Away" on American Idol winner Lee DeWyze's album Frames,

In 2014 Seibold began a side project, the Rix, with Ricky Jackson of the Daylights. Their first single, "Beautiful Disaster", was included in Season 5 of Pretty Little Liars and featured singer Jessi Collins. On October 7, 2014, the Rix released the song "Dizzy" also featuring Jessi Collins.

Seibold collaborated with indie artist RIVVRS (Brandon Zahursky) on the song "Save My Soul", which was included in The CW's Reign and Frequency, USA's Eyewitness, NBC's The Night Shift, and MTV's Finding Carter.

As a songwriter and producer, Seibold has received two GMA Dove Awards as a producer on Bright Ones with Bethel Music. He also co-wrote the songs "Glory to Glory" and "Old for New".

Seibold is now a member of indie pop trio 3 One Oh.

== Discography ==
| Year | Album |
|---|---|
| 2007 | That's the Day (EP) |
| 2009 | New York (EP) |
| 2009 | Acoustic New York |
| 2009 | "Why Won't It Snow Here" (Single) |
| 2011 | "Summertime Tonight" (Single) |
