= Wake Up Call (Nothing But Thieves song) =

Single by Nothing but Thieves

from the album Nothing but Thieves
- Released: 2014
- Genre: Alternative rock
- Length: 2:45
- Label: RCA
- Songwriter(s): Joseph Brown; Dominic Craik; Larry Hibbitt; Conor Mason
- Producer(s): Julian Emery

Nothing but Thieves singles chronology
"Wake Up Call" (2014)	"Tempt You (Evocatio)" (2014)

"Wake Up Call" is a song by English alternative rock band Nothing but Thieves. It was produced by Julian Emery and was released as the band's debut single from their self-titled album in 2014. It peaked at number 19 on the Billboard Alternative Songs chart in 2016.

== Music video ==
The official music video was released onto YouTube on 26 August 2015.

== Charts ==
Chart (2015–16)	Peak position
Canada Rock (Billboard)	32
UK Rock & Metal (OCC)	4
US Rock Airplay (Billboard)	30
