= Live It Up (Lee DeWyze album) =

Studio album by Lee DeWyze
- Released: November 16, 2010
- Recorded: June–October 2010
- Genre: Folk; rock; pop
- Label: RCA; 19
- Producer: Toby Gad; John Shanks; Espionage; David Glass; David Hodges; Chris DeStefano

Lee DeWyze chronology
Slumberland (2010)	Live It Up (2010)	Frames (2013)

Singles from Live It Up
- 1. "Sweet Serendipity" Released: October 13, 2010; 2. "Beautiful Like You" Released: March 15, 2011

Live It Up is the major-label debut studio album, and third overall, by American Idol season nine winner, Lee DeWyze. The album was released on November 16, 2010, in the United States by RCA Records.

== Recording ==
After winning the ninth season of American Idol on May 27, 2010, DeWyze signed a recording contract with 19 Entertainment and RCA Records. He started recording soon after and continued during the American Idols LIVE! Tour and completed in early October 2010. He worked with Toby Gad, John Shanks, Espionage, and other producers. DeWyze co-wrote ten of the eleven songs on Live It Up. He explained about the album and work:

"To see my name listed in the credits on each song was really important to me because I’m a songwriter. I also loved working with such talented writers. They all brought so much to the table and really helped me flesh out my sound. I grew up listening to Simon & Garfunkel, The Mamas & the Papas, Cat Stevens, and Kris Kristofferson. I love hard-edged vocals over pretty melodies — that’s what I’m about.″

== Singles ==
The first single, "Sweet Serendipity," premiered on On Air with Ryan Seacrest on October 13, 2010. The song went for adds on hot adult contemporary radio stations on October 25, 2010 and became available for download at digital music vendors on October 26, 2010. DeWyze performed "Beautiful Like You", the second single from the album, on the American Idol Season 10 Top 12 Results show on March 17, 2011.

== Critical reception ==
Professional ratings
Review scores
Source	Rating
Allmusic	2/5 stars
New York Times	2/5 stars
Entertainment Weekly	C
Chicago Tribune	2/4 stars
IGN	7/10 stars
The Dallas Morning News	C−
US Magazine	Poor
JS Online	Mixed

Upon its release, Live It Up received generally mixed reviews from most music critics. At Metacritic, which assigns a normalized rating out of 100 to reviews from mainstream critics, the album received an average score of 45, based on 4 reviews, which indicates "mixed or average reviews".

Stephen Thomas Erlewine of Allmusic gave the album a mixed review saying, "DeWyze can wrangle a pleasant melody, particularly when he’s favoring sunswept SoCal folk-pop, but he can’t resist sabotaging his slight charms with a studied hamminess, adopting a gravelly growl whenever he wants to appear soulful and leaning so hard in his phrasing that he stumbles instead of shuffles."

== Commercial performance ==
Live It Up sold 39,000 copies in its first week, debuting at number nineteen on the Billboard 200. The album spent 10 consecutive weeks on the Billboard 200 and, after an eight-week absence, returned to the chart at number 96 following DeWyze's performance on the American Idol Season 10 Top 12 Results show. As of August 12, 2013, the album has sold 153,000 copies in the United States. DeWyze's album is also the second album of an American Idol winner (after Kris Allen's self-titled debut, which premiered and peaked at number eleven) to not debut in the top ten of the Billboard 200.

== Track listing ==
No.	Title	Writer(s)	Producer(s)	Length
1.	"Live It Up"	Lee DeWyze; Toby Gad; Lindy Robbins	Gad	3:16
2.	"Sweet Serendipity"	DeWyze; David Glass; Jordan Lawhead	Glass	3:19
3.	"It's Gotta Be Love"	DeWyze; Espen Lind; Amund Bjørklund; Claude Kelly	Espionage	3:36
4.	"Dear Isabelle"	DeWyze; Gad; Robbins	Gad	2:48
5.	"Beautiful Like You"	Thomas "Tawgs" Salter; Andy Stochansky	Chris DeStefano	4:53
6.	"Stay Here"	DeWyze; Lind; Bjørklund; Kelly	Espionage	3:42
7.	"Me and My Jealousy"	DeWyze; John Shanks; Zac Maloy	Shanks	3:34
8.	"Brooklyn Bridge"	DeWyze; Gad; Robbins	Gad	3:45
9.	"Weightless"	DeWyze; Shanks; Maloy	Shanks	3:10
10.	"Earth Stood Still"	DeWyze; Gad; Robbins	Gad	3:18
11.	"A Song About Love"	DeWyze; David Hodges; busbee	Hodges	2:56
12.	"Say It All Over Again" (Bonus track, iTunes album pre-order only)	James Morrison; Steve Robson; Martin Brammer		4:03
13.	"Only Dreaming" (Bonus track, American Idol Store Deluxe Version)	DeWyze; Hodges; DeStefano		3:21

== Personnel ==
Adapted from AllMusic.

Vocals

- Chris DeStefano – background vocals
- Lee DeWyze – background vocals, lead vocals
- David Glass – background vocals

Musicians

- Kenny Aronoff – drums
- busbee – bass
- David Glass – drums, Fender Rhodes, acoustic guitar, electric guitar, keyboards, percussion, piano, synthesizer
- David Hodges – guitar, percussion, piano
- Charlie Judge – keyboards, synthesizer
- Shawn Pelton – drums
- John Shanks – bass, guitar, keyboards

Production

- Jeff Aldrich – A&R
- Amund Bjørklund – engineer
- Dan Chase – programming
- Chris DeStefano – engineer, instrumentation, producer, programming
- Lars Fox – Pro Tools
- Toby Gad – instrumentation, mixing, producer, programming, vocal engineer
- Chris Garcia – vocal producer
- Serban Ghenea – mixing
- David Glass – producer
- David Hodges – engineer, producer
- Ted Jensen – mastering
- Espen Lind – engineer
- Manny Marroquin – mixing
- Francis Murray – mastering
- Ross Petersen – engineer
- Iain Pirie – A&R
- Christian Plata – assistant
- Tim Roberts – assistant, mixing assistant
- Jeff Rothschild – engineer, mixing, programming
- John Shanks – producer
- Shari Sutcliffe – project coordinator

Imagery

- Dee Anderson – stylist
- Erwin Gorostiza – creative director
- Jilan O'Neil – groomer
- Christina Rodriguez – art direction
- Jiro Schneider – photography

== Charts ==
=== Chart positions ===
Chart	Peak position
US Billboard 200	19

=== Sales ===
Country	Sales
United States (171,000)	149,000
