= Broken Machine (album) =

Studio album by Nothing but Thieves
- Released: 8 September 2017
- Studio: Ranch Studios, California; Grand Cru, London
- Genre: Alternative rock; indie rock; hard rock
- Length: 43:31
- Label: RCA; Sony
- Producer: Mike Crossey

Nothing but Thieves chronology
Nothing but Thieves (2015)	Broken Machine (2017)	What Did You Think When You Made Me This Way? (2018)

Deluxe edition cover

Singles from Broken Machine
- 1. "Amsterdam" Released: 2 May 2017; 2. "Sorry" Released: 14 August 2017; 3. "Broken Machine" Released: 21 August 2017; 4. "I'm Not Made by Design" Released: 26 August 2017; 5. "Particles" Released: 11 January 2018

Broken Machine is the second studio album by English rock band Nothing but Thieves. It was released on 8 September 2017 under RCA and Sony Music and produced by Mike Crossey.

== Critical reception ==
Professional ratings
Review scores
Source	Rating
GIGsoup	76/100
The Music	4/5 stars
PopMatters	8/10
The Soundboard	6/10 stars
Varsity	4/5 stars
Genre Is Dead!	4.5/5 stars

Upon release, Broken Machine received generally positive reviews from critics, with several comments on the development of the band's style. Roisin Oconnor of The Independent described the album as being among 'the best rock albums of the year'. She wrote that it 'showcases the band's consciousness' both on their own development and on the global events taking place around the world.

Varsity's Sarah Taylor awarded the album 4 out of 5 stars, writing that there had been notable anticipation leading up to the album's release and that it '[did] not disappoint'. Taylor also praised the album for 'pushing more boundaries than the last', highlighting the variety in their music and lyricism as an example of them further defining their style.

Linda Köke of Genre Is Dead! gave similar praise, writing that the band had showcased their ability to 'follow in the footsteps of rock giants' with their latest album. Köke praises the album's energy while Taylor praises the album's experimental nature, though Köke provides a slightly contrary opinion, describing the tenth track "Hell, Yeah" as being an 'almost mandatory late-album ballad'. Köke does however go on to award the album 4.5 out of 5 stars.

Luke Nuttall of The Soundboard builds on the more critical thoughts of Köke by describing the album as having only 'fragments' of the strongest elements from its predecessor, with most of the 'heavy lifting' being done by the vocals of Conor Mason. Nuttall echoes criticism of final tracks "Hell, Yeah" and "Afterlife", going as far as to argue that the tracks are only 'tolerable' because of the band's capabilities. Nuttall also criticised the production quality on the album, describing it as seeming more 'lax' compared to their debut. He provides a contrasting opinion to that of Taylor and Köke, stating that the band's attempt to experiment with their sound as 'falling flat'. In closing however, Nuttall does describe the album as having 'some nice ideas that are definitely eligible to carry on into the future'.

== Track listing ==
Credits adapted from the deluxe album notes.

Broken Machine track listing
No.	Title	Writer(s)	Length
1.	"I Was Just a Kid"	Nothing but Thieves; Julian Emery; Jim Irvin	4:30
2.	"Amsterdam"	Nothing but Thieves	4:32
3.	"Sorry"	Nothing but Thieves; Julian Emery; Jim Irvin	3:34
4.	"Broken Machine"	Nothing but Thieves; Julian Emery; Jim Irvin	3:54
5.	"Live Like Animals"	Nothing but Thieves	4:10
6.	"Soda"	Nothing but Thieves; Larry Hibbitt	3:56
7.	"I'm Not Made by Design"	Nothing but Thieves; Julian Emery; Jim Irvin	3:52
8.	"Particles"	Nothing but Thieves	3:55
9.	"Get Better"	Nothing but Thieves; Julian Emery; Jim Irvin	3:18
10.	"Hell, Yeah"	Nothing but Thieves; Julian Emery; Jim Irvin	3:06
11.	"Afterlife"	Nothing but Thieves	4:43
Total length:			43:31

Deluxe, limited and special edition bonus tracks
No.	Title	Writer(s)	Length
12.	"Reset Me"	Nothing but Thieves; Larry Hibbitt; Mike Crossey	3:31
13.	"Number 13"	Nothing but Thieves	2:57
14.	"Sorry" (acoustic)	Nothing but Thieves; Julian Emery; Jim Irvin	3:34
15.	"Particles" (piano version)	Nothing but Thieves	3:39
Total length:			57:12

Japanese edition bonus tracks
No.	Title	Writer(s)	Length
16.	"I Need Air (demo)"	Nothing but Thieves	3:09
17.	"Stuck on You (demo)"	Nothing but Thieves	4:07
Total length:			65:49

== Personnel ==
Credits adapted from deluxe album's liner notes.

=== Nothing but Thieves ===
- Conor Mason – vocals
- Joe Langridge-Brown – guitar, percussion
- Dominic Craik – guitar, percussion, piano on "Particles" (piano version)
- Phil Blake – bass
- James Price – drums

=== Additional personnel ===
- Mike Crossey – production, mixing, programming
- Dominic Craik – programming, mixing on "Sorry" (acoustic) and "Particles" (piano version)
- Jonathan Gilmore – engineering, programming
- Joseph Rodgers – engineering on "Sorry" (acoustic) and "Particles" (piano version)
- Robin Schmidt – mastering

== Charts and certifications ==
Chart (2017)	Peak position
Australian Albums (ARIA)	12
Austrian Albums (Ö3 Austria)	54
Belgian Albums (Ultratop Flanders)	29
Belgian Albums (Ultratop Wallonia)	76
Canadian Albums (Billboard)	81
Dutch Albums (Album Top 100)	8
Finnish Albums (Suomen virallinen lista)	48
German Albums (Offizielle Top 100)	67
Irish Albums (IRMA)	41
Italian Albums (FIMI)	47
New Zealand Heatseekers Albums (RMNZ)	4
Polish Albums (ZPAV)	14
Scottish Albums (OCC)	5
Swiss Albums (Schweizer Hitparade)	27
UK Albums (OCC)	2
US Billboard 200	195
US Top Rock Albums (Billboard)	46

=== Certifications ===
Region	Certification	Certified units/sales
Netherlands (NVPI)	Gold	20,000^{‡}
Poland (ZPAV)	Gold	10,000^{‡}
United Kingdom (BPI)	Gold	100,000^{‡}
^{‡} Sales+streaming figures based on certification alone.

== Release history ==
Region	Date	Format	Label	Catalog no.
Europe	8 September 2017	LP; CS	RCA; Sony	88985437031
Europe	8 September 2017	CD	RCA; Sony	88985437032
Europe	8 September 2017	CD (deluxe edition)	RCA; Sony	88985437042
United Kingdom	8 September 2017	LP (limited edition, signed)	RCA; Sony	88985447331, 889854370619
United Kingdom	8 September 2017	LP (special edition)	RCA; Sony	88985447331
United States	8 September 2017	CD	RCA	88985-43703-1
Japan	8 September 2017	CD	RCA; Sony	SICP-5578

== See also ==
- Kintsugi
