= Nothing but Thieves (album) =

Studio album by Nothing but Thieves
- Released: 16 October 2015
- Genres: Alternative rock; indie rock; hard rock
- Length: 40:32
- Label: RCA
- Producer: Julian Emery

Nothing but Thieves chronology
Ban All the Music (2015)	Nothing but Thieves (2015)	Broken Machine (2017)

Singles from Nothing but Thieves
- 1. "Wake Up Call" Released: 2014; 2. "Tempt You (Evocatio)" Released: 2014; 3. "Ban All the Music" Released: 2015; 4. "Itch" Released: 2015; 5. "Hanging" Released: 2015; 6. "Trip Switch" Released: 18 June 2015; 7. "Honey Whiskey" Released: 2015; 8. "If I Get High" Released: 2016; 9. "Excuse Me" Released: 2016

Professional ratings
Review scores
Source	Rating
Contactmusic.com	2.5/5 stars
PopMatters	5/10 stars
Renowned for Sound	4.5/5 stars
Stereoboard	3/5 stars

Nothing but Thieves is the debut studio album by English alternative rock band Nothing but Thieves. It was released on 16 October 2015 in the UK through Sony Music Entertainment, and on 5 February 2016 in the US through RCA Victor.

It was produced by Julian Emery, with additional production by Jim Irvin, Dominic Craik and Larry Hibbitt, and mixes by Cenzo Townshend and Adam Noble.

In 2026, the song "If I Get High" was used as the introduction for season four, episode one of Invincible as a montage sequence.

== Artwork ==
The artwork was created by designer Steve Stacey, incorporating the work of photographer Miriam Sweeney. During the production process, the band provided approximately 15 reference images, which Stacey used to develop a cohesive visual theme. The central concept of the artwork is decaying nature, a theme that guided the design direction for both the band and the designer.

Stacey noted that a shared background in Essex between himself and the band contributed to a sense of familiarity throughout the project. When asked whether the image of the horse featured on the cover was a "ghost horse", Stacey responded that it was not.

In November 2025, the artwork on streaming services was changed to one with inverted colours.

== Commercial performance ==
As of May 4, 2017, the album has sold over 250,000 copies, and accumulated 174 million track streams.

== Track listing ==
No.	Title	Writer(s)	Length
1.	"Excuse Me"	Joseph Brown; Dominic Craik; Julian Emery; Jim Irvin; Conor Mason	3:38
2.	"Ban All the Music"	Brown; Craik; Mason	2:52
3.	"Wake Up Call"	Brown; Craik; Larry Hibbitt; Mason	2:45
4.	"Itch"	Brown; Craik; Hibbitt; Mason	3:24
5.	"If I Get High"	Brown; Craik; Mason	3:26
6.	"Graveyard Whistling"	Brown; Craik; Emery; Irvin; Mason	3:52
7.	"Hostage"	Brown; Craik; Emery; Irvin; Mason	3:49
8.	"Trip Switch"	Brown; Craik; Emery; Irvin; Mason	3:01
9.	"Lover, Please Stay"	Brown	4:07
10.	"Drawing Pins"	Brown; Craik; Mason	3:37
11.	"Painkiller"	Brown; Craik; Mason	2:25
12.	"Tempt You (Evocatio)"	Brown; Craik; Emery; Irvin; Mason	3:36

Deluxe version bonus tracks
No.	Title	Length
13.	"Honey Whiskey"	3:12
14.	"Hanging"	3:51
15.	"Neon Brother"	3:55
16.	"Six Billion"	3:47

== Personnel ==
Nothing but Thieves

- Conor Mason – vocals
- Joseph Langridge-Brown – guitars
- Dominic Craik – guitars, keyboard
- Philip Blake – bass
- James Price – drums

Technical personnel

- Julian Emery – production
- Jim Irvin – additional production
- Dominic Craik – additional production
- Larry Hibbitt – additional production
- Cenzo Townshend – mixing
- Adam Noble – mixing
- Robin Schmidt – mastering
- Steve Stacey – art direction

== Charts and certifications ==
Chart (2015–2016)	Peak position
Australian Albums (ARIA)	27
Belgian Albums (Ultratop Flanders)	111
Belgian Albums (Ultratop Wallonia)	104
Dutch Albums (Album Top 100)	50
Irish Albums (IRMA)	72
Italian Albums (FIMI)	97
Swiss Albums (Schweizer Hitparade)	74
UK Albums (Official Charts)	7
US Billboard 200	130
US Top Alternative Albums (Billboard)	11
US Top Rock Albums (Billboard)	15
Chart (2018)	Peak position
Polish Albums (ZPAV)	34

=== Certifications ===
Region	Certification	Certified units/sales
Netherlands (NVPI)	Gold	20,000^{‡}
United Kingdom (BPI)	Gold	100,000^{‡}
^{‡} Sales+streaming figures based on certification alone.
