= Nothing but Thieves =

English rock band

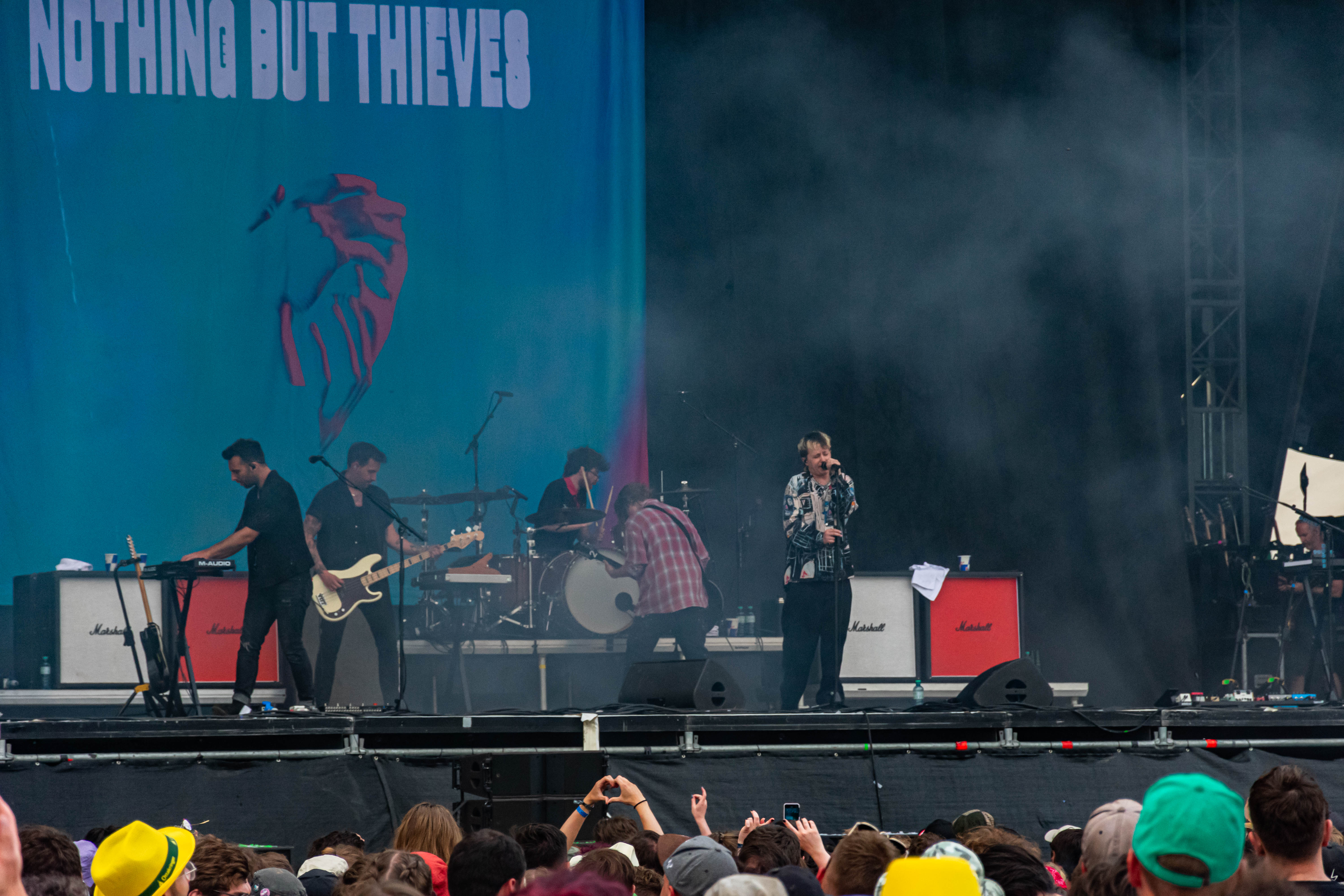
- Nothing but Thieves performing at Nova Rock Festival, 2023.: From left: Craik, Blake, Price, Langridge-Brown, Mason.

Background information
- Origin: Southend-on-Sea, Essex, England
- Genres: Alternative rock; indie rock; hard rock
- Years active: 2012–present
- Labels: Sony; RCA
- Members: Conor Mason; Joe Langridge-Brown; Dominic Craik; Philip Blake; James Price
- Past members: Dave Dickinson; Benjamin Gershinson; Clark Henry-Brown
- Website: nbthieves.com

Nothing but Thieves are an English rock band, formed in 2012 in Southend-on-Sea, Essex consisting of lead vocalist and guitarist Conor Mason, guitarist Joe Langridge-Brown, guitarist and keyboardist Dominic Craik, bassist Philip Blake, and drummer James Price. In 2014, they signed to RCA Records and a year later in October 2015, they released their self-titled debut album. Their second album, Broken Machine was released in September 2017, receiving wide acclaim in addition to peaking at No. 2 on the UK Albums Chart. They released an EP titled What Did You Think When You Made Me This Way? in October 2018, followed by their third studio album, Moral Panic, in October 2020. This was followed in July 2021 by the album's "second part" with the EP entitled Moral Panic II. In June 2023, they released their fourth studio album, Dead Club City, which became their first UK No. 1 album.

Their style of music has been compared to the likes of Jeff Buckley, Foals, Civil Twilight, Queens of the Stone Age, Royal Blood and Muse.

== History ==
=== 2012–2016: Formation and debut album ===
The band's single "Itch" picked up Hottest Record and Track of the Day accolades on Radio 1 and also made it onto the Radio 1 playlist, as well as being added in regular rotation of SiriusXM new hard rock channel Octane. The band were picked by Gerard Way and thereafter Awolnation to support European dates. They supported Arcade Fire and George Ezra at the BRITs show for War Child at the Electric in Brixton, performed at the NME Awards show, and toured with Twin Atlantic, Darlia, and Young Guns on separate support tours across the country. They were also added to a multitude of European festivals including Reading & Leeds and Isle of Wight Festival. In November 2014 they supported Twenty One Pilots alongside Purple at London's Electric Brixton. In July 2015 they supported Muse at the Rock in Roma show, playing in front of 30,000 people.

Nothing but Thieves, their debut studio album, was released on 16 October 2015 in the UK through Sony Music, and on 5 February 2016 in the US through RCA Victor. It was produced by Julian Emery, with additional production by Jim Irvin, Dominic Craik and Larry Hibbitt, and mixes by Cenzo Townshend and Adam Noble. It entered the Official UK Albums Chart at No. 7, peaked at No. 3 on iTunes, and was No. 1 on the vinyl album charts. Their single "Trip Switch" climbed to No. 1 on the US Billboard Alternative format airplay chart.

Their sold-out "Ban All the Music" tour of the UK began on 19 October 2015. A second British tour in April 2016, called the "Under My Skin" tour, was announced on 9 November 2015. The band had to postpone some dates on their "Under My Skin" tour as they were asked to support Muse on their "Drones" tour. They tweeted their elation on Twitter, branding the experience "pretty awesome".

In June 2016 they announced further tour dates in November and December 2016 in Birmingham, Manchester and London climaxing at the 5,000 capacity Brixton Academy. As of May 4, 2017, the album has sold over 250,000 copies, and accumulated 174 million track streams.

=== 2016–2020: Broken Machine and What Did You Think When You Made Me This Way? ===
A small tour of UK clubs took place in late May 2017, to support "Amsterdam", the first single from their second album Broken Machine, released on 8 September 2017. Later on 14 August, the second single, "Sorry", became their first single to chart on the UK singles chart, reaching No. 89. On 5 August 2017 they played to a crowd of over 500,000 people at Woodstock Festival Poland. On 23 August 2017 they supported Muse and Biffy Clyro at Vital Festival in Belfast ahead of their sold out "Broken Machine" tour. The band also sold out two consecutive nights at the Roundhouse in London.

Sarah Taylor said on Varsity: "In general, this album pushes more boundaries than the last one. The band carved a name for themselves with their debut, but here it feels like they're trying to define themselves to a further extent; there's more variety in the music and lyricism, and more politics, too. Joe Langridge-Brown, guitarist and lyricist alongside Mason, said that "all the songs on the album are things that we've gone through or spoken about: Trump, religion, bigotry..." and 'Live Like Animals' is an anthem for the disillusioned youth. It features lyrics such as "We put our lives all up for sale / We get our truth in the Daily Mail" and "We're gonna make 'em build a wall / We're gonna live like animals". Other tracks, such as 'Broken Machine' itself, and the deluxe version's 'Number 13' are more experimental rhythmically: they're the type of songs you have to listen to a few times before you decide whether you like them or not. I did, and I do".

On 23 June 2023, Broken Machine was certified Gold by the BPI.

On 24 August 2018, the band debuted a new song live titled "Forever and Ever More" at Reading Festival, which was released as the lead off single from their new EP, What Did You Think When You Made Me This Way? a few days later. The EP was released on 19 October 2018 alongside the second single "Take This Lonely Heart", on the same day.

=== 2020–2023: Moral Panic and Moral Panic II ===
On 18 March 2020, the first single of their third studio album was released, named "Is Everybody Going Crazy?". On 23 June 2020, the band announced that their third album, titled Moral Panic would be released on 23 October 2020, alongside the release of the second single from the album, "Real Love Song", on the same day. Three more singles followed; "Unperson", "Impossible" and "Phobia". On 14 September 2020, dates for a UK and Ireland arena tour were announced, beginning in September 2021. The album was released on 23 October 2020, receiving generally favourable reviews. It reached No. 3 on the UK Albums Chart.

Despite not being able to play gigs, a new single, called "Futureproof" was released on 8 June 2021. It was the first single off a new EP, titled Moral Panic II, which was announced on 9 July 2021 and released on 23 July, along with second single "Miracle, Baby". Speaking of the EP, the band said they "didn't feel like we were done with the Moral Panic theme", and the release aims to "explore some avenues we felt the album may have missed".

The band undertook a tour of the UK in October 2021, including a headline show at the London O2 Arena on October 8, 2021.

=== 2023–2026: Dead Club City ===
On 15 March 2023, the band released the single, "Welcome to the DCC", alongside announcing their fourth album, titled Dead Club City, which was released on 30 June 2023. On 7 July 2023, the album became the band's first to reach number one on the OCC's UK Albums Chart. One of the songs from this album, "Welcome to the DCC", was announced as BBC Radio 1's Hottest Record of the Year 2023 on 14 December 2023 whilst a second, "Overcome", was also voted Record of the Year 2023 by listeners to Radio X. "Overcome" became the band's first top 10 single in the Netherlands and ranked at No. 3 on the 2023 Dutch Top 40 year-end chart.

=== 2026–present: Stray Dogs ===
On 20 May 2026, the band released ″Evolution″, the lead single for their upcoming album. On 10 July 2026, they released the single "Stray Dogs", "Baby Kool (Evelyn)" on 5 August and "A Different Kind of Happiness" on 8 September. On 25 September 2026, they released their fifth and latest to day album titled "Stray Dogs" , made up of a total of 12 songs.

== Band members ==
Current

- Conor Mason – lead vocals, guitars
- Joe Langridge-Brown – guitars, keyboard, backing vocals
- Dominic Craik – guitars, keyboard, piano, backing vocals
- Philip Blake – bass guitar, synthesizer
- James Price – drums, drum machine

== Discography ==
=== Studio albums ===
List of studio albums, with selected chart positions, sales figures and certifications
Title	Album details	Peak chart positions										Certifications
Title	Album details	UK	AUS	BEL (FL)	BEL (WA)	GER	IRE	ITA	NL	SWI	US	Certifications
Nothing but Thieves	Released: 16 October 2015 (US); Label: Sony Music UK, RCA; Formats: CD, LP, digital download	7	27	111	104	—	72	97	36	74	130	BPI: Gold; NVPI: Gold
Broken Machine	Released: 8 September 2017; Label: Sony Music UK; Formats: CD, LP, cassette, digital download, streaming	2	12	29	76	67	41	57	8	27	195	BPI: Gold; NVPI: Gold
Moral Panic	Released: 23 October 2020; Label: Sony Music UK; Formats: CD, LP, digital download, streaming	3	8	21	70	35	87	42	5	28	— (Note: Moral Panic did not enter the US Billboard 200, but peaked at number 13 on the US Heatseekers Albums Chart.)	BPI: Silver
Dead Club City	Released: 30 June 2023; Label: Sony Music UK; Formats: CD, LP, cassette, digital download, streaming	1	10	8	34	31	67	91	1	12	— (Note: Dead Club City did not enter the US Billboard 200, but peaked at number 12 on the US Heatseekers Albums Chart.)	BPI: Silver
Stray Dogs	Released: 25 September 2026; Label: Sony Music UK; Formats: CD, LP, digital download, streaming	3	9	1	7	22	—	— (Note: Stray Dogs did not enter the Italian Top Albums chart, but peaked at number 15 on the Italian Physical Albums chart.)	1	11	—	
"—" denotes a recording that did not chart or was not released in that territory.

=== Extended plays ===
List of extended plays with selected chart positions
Title	EP details	Peak chart positions		
Title	EP details	UK DL	SWI	US Heat
If You Don't Believe, It Can't Hurt You	Released: 28 October 2013; Label: Voleur Records; Formats: CD, EP	—	—	—
Graveyard Whistling	Released: 18 July 2014; Label: War Road Music, Razor & Tie; Formats: CD, EP	—	—	—
Ban All the Music	Released: 7 July 2015; Label: Sony Music UK, RCA; Formats: CD, EP	—	—	—
Urchin	Released: 16 October 2015; Label: Sony Music UK, RCA, Voleur Records; Formats: CD, EP	—	—	—
What Did You Think When You Made Me This Way?	Released: 19 October 2018; Label: Sony Music UK, RCA; Formats: CD, LP, digital download, streaming	—	—	4
Moral Panic II	Released: 23 July 2021; Label: Sony Music UK; Formats: Digital download, streaming	5	75	—
"—" denotes a recording that did not chart or was not released in that territory.

=== Singles ===
List of singles, with selected chart positions shown
Title	Year	Peak chart positions										Certifications	Album
Title	Year	UK	BEL (FL)	CIS	CZR	FIN	NLD	NZ Hot	SCO	US Rock	WAL	Certifications	Album
"To Fly You've Got to Fall"	2012	—	—	—	—	—	—	—	—	—	—		Non-album singles
"Lover, Please Stay" (live)	2013	—	—	—	—	—	—	—	—	—	—		Non-album singles
"Wake Up Call"	2014	—	— (Note: "Wake Up Call" did not enter the Flanders Ultratop Top 50, but peaked at 21 on the Flanders Ultratop Bubbling Under chart.)	—	—	—	—	—	—	— (Note: "Wake Up Call" did not enter the Rock Songs chart, but peaked at number 30 on the Rock Airplay chart.)	—		Nothing but Thieves
"Tempt You (Evocatio)"	2014	—	—	—	—	—	—	—	—	—	—		Nothing but Thieves
"Holding Out for a Hero"	2015	—	—	—	—	—	—	—	—	—	—		Non-album single
"Itch"	2015	195	— (Note: "Itch" did not enter the Flanders Ultratop Top 50, but peaked at 51 on the Flanders Ultratop Bubbling Under chart.)	—	—	—	—	—	—	—	—		Nothing but Thieves
"Hanging"	2015	—	—	—	—	—	—	—	—	—	—		Nothing but Thieves
"Trip Switch"	2015	—	— (Note: "Trip Switch" did not enter the Flanders Ultratop Top 50, but peaked at 10 on the Flanders Ultratop Bubbling Under chart.)	—	—	69	35	—	—	19	—	BPI: Silver	Nothing but Thieves
"Honey Whiskey"	2015	—	—	—	—	—	—	—	—	—	—		Nothing but Thieves
"If I Get High"	2016	—	—	—	—	—	—	—	—	—	—		Nothing but Thieves
"Amsterdam"	2017	— (Note: "Amsterdam" did not enter the UK Singles Chart, but peaked at number 98 on the UK Singles Downloads Chart.)	— (Note: "Amsterdam" did not enter the Flanders Ultratop Top 50, but charted as an "extra tip" on the Flanders Ultratop Bubbling Under chart.)	—	—	—	—	—	72	—	—	BPI: Gold	Broken Machine
"Sorry"	2017	89	— (Note: "Sorry" did not enter the Flanders Ultratop Top 50, but charted as an "extra tip" on the Flanders Ultratop Bubbling Under chart.)	—	—	—	29	—	53	40	—	BPI: Silver	Broken Machine
"I'm Not Made by Design"	2017	—	—	—	—	—	—	—	—	—	—		Broken Machine
"Broken Machine"	2017	—	—	—	—	—	—	—	—	—	—		Broken Machine
"I Need Air" / "Stuck on You"	2017	— (Note: "I Need Air" / "Stuck on You" did not enter the UK Singles Chart, but peaked at number 28 on the UK Physical Singles Chart.)	—	—	—	—	—	—	—	—	—		Broken Machine
"Particles"	2018	—	—	—	—	—	— (Note: "Particles" did not enter the Netherlands Single Top 100 but peaked on the Netherlands Single Tip Chart at number 30.)	—	—	—	—		Broken Machine
"Lover, You Should've Come Over" (live)	2018	—	—	—	—	—	—	—	—	—	—		Non-album singles
"Crazy"	2018	— (Note: "Crazy" did not enter the UK Singles Chart, but peaked at number 22 on the UK Physical Singles Chart.)	—	—	—	—	—	—	—	—	—		Non-album singles
"Forever & Ever More"	2018	— (Note: "Forever & Ever More" did not enter the UK Singles Chart, but peaked at number 54 on the UK Singles Downloads Chart.)	—	—	—	—	— (Note: "Forever & Ever More" did not enter the Netherlands Single Top 100 but peaked on the Netherlands Single Tip Chart at number 26.)	—	48	—	—		What Did You Think When You Made Me This Way?
"Take This Lonely Heart"	2018	—	—	—	—	—	—	—	—	—	—		What Did You Think When You Made Me This Way?
"Is Everybody Going Crazy?"	2020	— (Note: "Is Everybody Going Crazy?" did not enter the UK Singles Chart, but peaked at number 95 on the UK Singles Downloads Chart.)	— (Note: "Is Everybody Going Crazy?" did not enter the Flanders Ultratop Top 50, but peaked at 24 on the Flanders Ultratop Bubbling Under chart.)	—	—	—	— (Note: "Is Everybody Going Crazy?" did not enter the Netherlands Single Top 100 but peaked on the Dutch Tipparade Chart at number 16.)	—	—	35	—	BPI: Silver	Moral Panic
"Real Love Song"	2020	—	—	—	—	—	—	—	99	— (Note: "Real Love Song" did not enter the Hot Rock & Alternative Songs chart, but peaked at number 34 on the Alternative Airplay chart.)	73		Moral Panic
"Unperson"	2020	—	—	—	—	—	—	—	—	—	—		Moral Panic
"Impossible"	2020	— (Note: "Impossible" did not enter the UK Singles Chart, but peaked at number 65 on the UK Singles Downloads Chart.)	45	—	—	—	26	—	68	—	—		Moral Panic
"Phobia"	2020	—	—	—	—	—	—	—	—	—	—		Moral Panic
"Futureproof"	2021	—	—	—	—	—	—	—	—	—	—		Moral Panic II
"Miracle, Baby"	2021	—	—	—	—	—	—	—	—	—	—		Moral Panic II
"Alone" (Nothing but Thieves remix) (with Rag'n'Bone Man)	2021	—	—	—	—	—	— (Note: "Alone" (Nothing but Thieves remix) did not enter the Netherlands Single Top 100 but peaked on the Dutch Tipparade Chart at number five.)	—	—	—	—		Non-album single
"Welcome to the DCC"	2023	97	—	—	—	—	29	39	—	—	—	BPI: Silver	Dead Club City
"Overcome"	2023	— (Note: "Overcome" did not enter the UK Singles Chart, but peaked at number 36 on the UK Singles Sales Chart.)	44	—	—	93	6	—	—	— (Note: "Overcome" did not enter the Hot Rock & Alternative Songs chart, but peaked at number 25 on the Alternative Airplay chart.)	—	BPI: Silver; NVPI: Gold	Dead Club City
"Keeping You Around"	2023	—	—	—	—	—	—	—	—	—	—		Dead Club City
"Tomorrow Is Closed"	2023	—	—	—	6	—	—	36	—	—	—		Dead Club City
"Something on My Mind" (with Duke Dumont and Purple Disco Machine)	2023	— (Note: "Something on My Mind" did not enter the UK Singles Chart, but peaked at number 47 on the UK Singles Sales Chart.)	4	198	—	—	29	—	—	—	—		Paradise
"Oh No :: He Said What?"	2024	— (Note: "Oh No :: He Said What?" did not enter the UK Singles Chart, but peaked at number 76 on the UK Singles Sales Chart.)	—	—	—	—	— (Note: "Oh No :: He Said What?" did not enter the Netherlands Single Top 100 but peaked on the Netherlands Airplay Top 50 Chart at number 46.)	—	—	—	—		Dead Club City (Deluxe)
"Evolution"	2026	— (Note: "Evolution" did not enter the UK Singles Chart, but peaked at number 67 on the UK Singles Sales Chart.)	—	—	—	—	— (Note: "Evolution" did not enter the Netherlands Single Top 100 but peaked on the Netherlands Single Tip Chart at number 30.)	—	—	—	—		Stray Dogs
"Stray Dogs"	2026	—	—	—	—	—	—	—	—	—	—		Stray Dogs
"Baby Kool (Evelyn)"	2026	— (Note: "Baby Kool (Evelyn)" did not enter the UK Singles Chart, but peaked at number 99 on the UK Singles Sales Chart.)	—	—	33	—	—	—	—	—	—		Stray Dogs
"A Different Kind of Happiness"	2026	—	—	—	—	—	—	—	—	—	—		Stray Dogs
"—" denotes a recording that did not chart or was not released in that territory.

=== Other charted songs ===
Title	Year	Peak chart positions				Album
Title	Year	UK Sales	UK Rock	BEL (FL) Tip	NLD Tip	Album
"Graveyard Whistling"	2014	—	—	50	—	Nothing but Thieves
"Ban All the Music"	2015	—	40	—	—	Nothing but Thieves
"Excuse Me"	2015	—	26	—	—	Nothing but Thieves
"Time :: Fate :: Karma :: God"	2024	84	—	—	—	Dead Club City (Deluxe)
"#5"	2026	—	—	—	22	Stray Dogs
"—" denotes a recording that did not chart or was not released in that territory.

=== Music videos ===
Title	Year	Director(s)
"Emergency"	2013	Lewis Cater
"Graveyard Whistling"	2014	Lewis Cater
"Last Orders"	2014	Lewis Cater
"Ban All the Music"	2015	Rob Brandon
"Itch"	2015	Roger Guàrdia
"Trip Switch"	2015	Unknown
"Wake Up Call" (version one)	2015	Unknown
"Wake Up Call" (version two)	2015	Lewis Cater
"If I Get High"	2016	Unknown
"Excuse Me"	2016	Unknown
"Amsterdam"	2017	Thomas James
"Sorry"	2017	Thomas James
"Particles"	2018	Unknown
"Forever & Ever More"	2018	Ivana Bobic
"Is Everybody Going Crazy?	2020	Remi Laudat
"Real Love Song"	2020	Unknown
"Unperson"	2020	Unknown
"Impossible"	2020	Elliott Gonzo
"Futureproof"	2021	Jake Jelicich
"Welcome to the DCC"	2023	Jay Green
"Overcome"	2023	Teeeezy C
"Tomorrow Is Closed"	2023	Unknown
"Something on My Mind"	2023	Denisha Anderson
"Evolution"	2026	Unknown
"Baby Kool (Evelyn)"	2026	Maxim Kelly

=== Other appearances ===
List of other appearances, showing year released and album name
Title	Year	Album	Ref.
"In My Head"	2015	Enter the Dangerous Mind	
"Life's Coming in Slow"	2022	Gran Turismo 7 Official Soundtrack	
"If I Get High"	2026	Invincible Season 4 Soundtrack	
