= What Did You Think When You Made Me This Way? =

2018 EP by Nothing but Thieves

EP by Nothing but Thieves
- Released: 19 October 2018
- Genres: Alternative rock; stoner rock; hard rock
- Length: 14:51
- Label: RCA
- Producer: Jim Abbiss

Nothing but Thieves chronology
Broken Machine (2017)	What Did You Think When You Made Me This Way? (2018)	Moral Panic (2020)

Singles from What Did You Think When You Made Me This Way?
- 1. "Forever & Ever More" Released: 27 August 2018; 2. "Take This Lonely Heart" Released: 19 October 2018

What Did You Think When You Made Me This Way? is the fifth EP released by English rock band Nothing but Thieves. It was released on 19 October 2018 through RCA Records. The EP's first single "Forever & Ever More" was released on 27 August 2018 through streaming services and as made available as a download. The second single "Take This Lonely Heart" was released also on 19 October 2018 to coincide with the record's release.

== Background and release ==
"Forever & Ever More" had its live debut at Reading Festival on 24 August 2018. The song had its radio debut on 27 August 2018 on BBC Radio 1 and was released to streaming and download services the same day. "Take This Lonely Heart" followed on 19 October 2018 as the second single.

The EP was released worldwide on 19 October 2018 through RCA Records as a digital download and physically on 12" vinyl.

== Music video ==
The music video for "Forever & Ever More" was released on 19 September 2018 and was directed by Ivana Bobic. The video features BBC Radio 1 DJ Cel Spellman staying at a holiday hotel. The video deals with themes such as isolation, lust, religion and mental health with Spellman's character appearing to be a loose cannon throughout the narrative before revealing himself to be a vampire in the final seconds.

== Critical reception ==
Clash magazine called the first single "Crunching heavyweight rock" and comparing the band with "pomp" of Queens of the Stone Age and "matching blistering energy" of early Foo Fighters. Billboard called the opening song a "pounding track" and praised Conor Mason's "operatic vocals".

== Track listing ==
No.	Title	Length
1.	"Forever & Ever More"	3:28
2.	"Gods"	3:29
3.	"You Know Me Too Well"	3:54
4.	"Take This Lonely Heart"	4:02
Total length:		14:51

== Personnel ==
Nothing but Thieves

- Conor Mason – vocals
- Joseph Langridge-Brown – guitars
- Dominic Craik – guitars, keyboard
- Philip Blake – bass
- James Price – drums

Technical personnel

- Jim Abbiss – production
- David Sardy – mixing

== Charts ==
Chart (2018)	Peak position
US Top Current Albums (Billboard)	99
US Heatseekers Albums (Billboard)	4
US Top Alternative Album Sales (Billboard)	15
US Top Rock Album Sales (Billboard)	35
