= Together Alone (Alex Hepburn album) =

Studio album by Alex Hepburn
- Released: April 12, 2013
- Genres: R&B; pop; rock
- Length: 43:31
- Label: Warner Bros. Records
- Producers: Dee Adam; Julian Emery; Ian Barter; Blair MacKichan; Gary Clark; Jimmy Hogarth

Alex Hepburn chronology
Together Alone (2013)	Things I've Seen (2019)

Singles from Together Alone
- 1. "Under" Released: 17 May 2013; 2. "Miss Misery" Released: 7 June 2013

Professional ratings
Review scores
Source	Rating
AllMusic	3.5/5 stars

Together Alone is the debut studio album by English singer Alex Hepburn. The album was released on 12 April 2013 through Warner Bros. Records. The record includes two singles "Under" and "Miss Misery". The album has charted well in many European countries, peaking at number two in the Swiss charts.

== Track listing ==
No.	Title	Writer(s)	Length
1.	"Miss Misery"	Alex Hepburn, James Earp	2:59
2.	"Bad Girl"	Alex Hepburn, Blair MacKichan	3:13
3.	"Broken Record"	Alex Hepburn, John Tilley	2:53
4.	"Pain Is"	Alex Hepburn, Linda Perry	3:54
5.	"Get Heavy"	Alex Hepburn, Jim Irvin, Julian Emery	3:46
6.	"Love to Love You"	Alex Hepburn, Jamie Hartman, Ian Barter	3:58
7.	"Reckless"	Alex Hepburn, Paul Barry	4:14
8.	"Angelina"	Alex Hepburn, James Earp, Dee Adam	3:52
9.	"Under"	Alex Hepburn, Gary Clark	3:58
10.	"Hold Me"	Alex Hepburn, Ian Barter	3:15
11.	"Two Point Four"	Alex Hepburn, James Earp, Dee Adam	3:27
12.	"Under (Radio Version)"	Alex Hepburn, Gary Clark	3:58
Total length:			43:31

== Charts ==
=== Weekly charts ===
Chart (2013)	Peak position
Austrian Albums (Ö3 Austria)	36
Belgian Albums (Ultratop Flanders)	36
Belgian Albums (Ultratop Wallonia)	15
French Albums (SNEP)	3
German Albums (Offizielle Top 100)	23
Swiss Albums (Schweizer Hitparade)	2

=== Year-end charts ===
Chart (2013)	Position
Belgian Albums (Ultratop Wallonia)	78
French Albums (SNEP)	47
Swiss Albums (Schweizer Hitparade)	33

== Certifications ==
Certifications for "Together Alone"
Region	Certification	Certified units/sales
France (SNEP)	Gold	50,000^{*}
Switzerland (IFPI Switzerland)	Gold	10,000^{^}
^{*} Sales figures based on certification alone.^{^} Shipments figures based on certification alone.
