= Sorry (Nothing but Thieves song) =

Single by Nothing but Thieves

from the album Broken Machine
- Released: 19 July 2017
- Genre: Alternative rock; pop rock
- Length: 3:34
- Label: RCA
- Producer: Mike Crossey

Nothing but Thieves singles chronology
"Amsterdam" (2017)	"Sorry" (2017)	"I'm Not Made by Design" (2017)

Music video
- "Sorry" on YouTube

"Sorry" is a song recorded by English alternative rock band Nothing but Thieves from their second studio album, Broken Machine (2017). The song was released by RCA Records on 19 July 2017, as the second single off the album. It reached number 89 on the UK Singles Chart.

== Music video ==
A music video to accompany the release of "Sorry" was first released onto YouTube on 19 July 2017, through Nothing but Thieves' official YouTube account. It's Thomas James's second video for Nothing but Thieves and was filmed in the Troyeshchyna district in Kyiv.

== Track listing ==
Digital download
No.	Title	Length
1.	"Sorry"	3:34

== Charts ==
Chart (2017–18)	Peak position
Scotland Singles (OCC)	53
Netherlands (Dutch Top 40)	29
UK Singles (OCC)	89
US Hot Rock & Alternative Songs (Billboard)	40
US Rock & Alternative Airplay (Billboard)	23

== Certifications ==
Certifications for "Sorry"
Region	Certification	Certified units/sales
United Kingdom (BPI)	Silver	200,000^{‡}
^{‡} Sales+streaming figures based on certification alone.

== Release history ==
Country	Date	Format	Label	Ref.
Various	19 July 2017	Digital download	RCA	
