= Under (Alex Hepburn song) =

Single by Alex Hepburn

from the album Together Alone
- Released: May 17, 2013
- Genre: R&B; pop rock
- Length: 3:58
- Label: Warner Music Central Europe
- Songwriters: Alex Hepburn; Gary Clark
- Producer: Gary Clark

Alex Hepburn singles chronology
"Under" (2013)	"Miss Misery" (2013)

"Under" is a song by English singer-songwriter Alex Hepburn. It was released on May 17, 2013 as the lead single from her debut album, Together Alone.

== Track listing ==
No.	Title	Length
1.	"Under" (written by Alex Hepburn and Gary Clark)	3:58
2.	"Woman" (written by Mc Vey, Sharp, Cherry)	3:28

== Charts ==
=== Weekly charts ===
Weekly chart performance for "Under"
Chart (2012–14)	Peak position
Austria (Ö3 Austria Top 40)	62
Belgium (Ultratop 50 Flanders)	10
Belgium (Ultratop 50 Wallonia)	2
Czech Republic Airplay (ČNS IFPI)	1
France (SNEP)	2
Germany (GfK)	34
Hungary (Rádiós Top 40)	39
Netherlands (Tipparade)	19
Poland Airplay (ZPAV)	2
Russia Airplay (TopHit)	6
Slovakia Airplay (ČNS IFPI)	11
Switzerland (Schweizer Hitparade)	5
Ukraine Airplay (TopHit)	4

=== Year-end charts ===
2013 year-end chart performance for "Under"
Chart (2013)	Position
Belgium (Ultratop Flanders)	59
Belgium (Ultratop Wallonia)	12
France (SNEP)	18
Russia Airplay (TopHit)	51
Switzerland (Schweizer Hitparade)	16
Ukraine Airplay (TopHit)	39

2014 year-end chart performance for "Under"
Chart (2014)	Position
Russia Airplay (TopHit)	92

=== Decade-end charts ===
2010s decade-end chart performance for "Under"
Chart (2010s)	Position
Ukrainian Airplay (TopHit)	179

== Certifications ==
Certifications for "Under"
Region	Certification	Certified units/sales
Belgium (BRMA)	Gold	15,000^{*}
France (SNEP)	Gold	75,000^{*}
Switzerland (IFPI Switzerland)	Platinum	30,000^{^}
^{*} Sales figures based on certification alone.^{^} Shipments figures based on certification alone.
