= Overcomer =

Overcomer may refer to:

== Albums ==
- Overcomer (album), a 2013 album by Mandisa

== Songs ==
- "Overcomer" (song), a 2013 song by Mandisa

== Films ==
- Overcomer (film), a 2019 American Christian drama film

== See also ==
- Overcome (disambiguation)
