= Dead Club City =

Studio album by Nothing but Thieves
- Released: 30 June 2023
- Genres: Indie rock; electropop
- Length: 42:18
- Label: Sony UK
- Producers: Dominic Craik; Jonathan Gilmore

Nothing but Thieves chronology
Moral Panic (2020)	Dead Club City (2023)	Stray Dogs (2026)

Singles from Dead Club City
- 1. "Welcome to the DCC" Released: 16 March 2023; 2. "Overcome" Released: 13 May 2023; 3. "Keeping You Around" Released: 23 June 2023; 4. "Tomorrow Is Closed" Released: 3 July 2023

Singles from Dead Club City (Deluxe)
- 1. "Oh No :: He Said What?" Released: 29 January 2024

Dead Club City is the fourth studio album by English alternative rock band Nothing but Thieves, released on 30 June 2023 through Sony Music UK. It was preceded by the singles "Welcome to the DCC", "Overcome", "Keeping You Around" and "Tomorrow Is Closed". It is the band's first album to chart at number one on the OCC's UK Albums Chart.

== Background ==
The band stated that the album's "overall narrative is formed by different characters and story arcs from in and around the city", and questioned "Is it a shared consciousness? Another planet? The next corporate wasteland? Heaven? Or somewhere else?" The album will also "introduce fresh elements in their rock-edged sound", with lead single "Welcome to the DCC" called "dance-enthused".

To work on the album in a different way, the band rented a country house in Essex for most of the recording process. They started working on the album on 28 August 2022. The album was finished in April 2023.

The release date was announced on 16 March through the band's social media accounts as 7 July. On 19 May, the release date was moved forward to 30 June.

On 29 January 2024, the band released "Oh No :: He Said What?", as well as announcing that a deluxe version of the album containing the song plus four others would be released on 15 March 2024.

On 17 July 2024, it was announced that an extended version of the deluxe edition of the album would be released exclusively on streaming services on 19 July 2024. It features live recordings of three songs performed at Wembley Arena, London and Ziggo Dome, Amsterdam.

== Cover art ==
The album's cover art was designed by artist Luke Brickett taking inspiration from world fairs such as Expo 70 and Epcot. A physical 3D model of the structure was printed and lit before being photographed on film for the cover.

== Critical reception ==
Professional ratings
Review scores
Source	Rating
Clash	8/10
The Eastern Echo	8/10
The AU Review	5/5 stars

Eleanor Noyce, reviewing the album for Clash, described it as "distinctly Nothing But Thieves, but with a fresher, funkier twist and a concept album foundation". Noyce also called it "cleaner cut, with more layers" as well as "inundated with huge, floor-filling bangers, stunning falsetto and thunderous guitar riffs".

== Track listing ==
All tracks are written by Dominic Craik, Joseph Langridge-Brown and Conor Mason; "Welcome to the DCC" and "Members Only" co-written with Julian Emery and Jim Irvin.

Dead Club City track listing
No.	Title	Length
1.	"Welcome to the DCC"	3:17
2.	"Overcome"	3:34
3.	"Tomorrow Is Closed"	3:58
4.	"Keeping You Around"	3:35
5.	"City Haunts"	3:11
6.	"Do You Love Me Yet?"	5:26
7.	"Members Only"	2:49
8.	"Green Eyes :: Siena"	3:48
9.	"Foreign Language"	3:54
10.	"Talking to Myself"	4:15
11.	"Pop the Balloon"	4:31
Total length:		42:18

Deluxe edition bonus tracks
No.	Title	Length
12.	"Oh No :: He Said What?"	3:48
13.	"Time :: Fate :: Karma :: God"	3:03
14.	"Pure You"	3:31
15.	"Overcome (Stripped)"	3:19
16.	"Tomorrow Is Closed (Stripped)"	4:15

Extended deluxe edition bonus tracks
No.	Title	Length
17.	"Welcome to the DCC – Live from Wembley Arena, London"	4:00
18.	"Tomorrow Is Closed – Live from Wembley Arena, London"	4:04
19.	"Oh No :: He Said What? – Live from Ziggo Dome, Amsterdam"	4:06

== Personnel ==
Nothing but Thieves

- Philip Blake – bass guitar
- Dominic Craik – guitar, programming, synthesizer
- Joe Langridge-Brown – guitar (all tracks), background vocals (tracks 6, 11)
- Conor Mason – vocals
- James Price – drums

Additional musicians

- Jonathan Gilmore – programming
- Torre Florim – background vocals, programming, synthesizer (3)
- Matt Johnson – programming, synthesizer (5)

Technical

- Jonathan Gilmore – production
- Robin Schmidt – mastering
- Mike Crossey – mixing
- Freddy Williams – engineering

== Charts ==
Chart performance for Dead Club City
Chart (2023)	Peak position
Australian Albums (ARIA)	10
Austrian Albums (Ö3 Austria)	53
Belgian Albums (Ultratop Flanders)	8
Belgian Albums (Ultratop Wallonia)	34
Dutch Albums (Album Top 100)	1
Finnish Physical Albums (Suomen virallinen lista)	10
French Albums (SNEP)	89
German Albums (Offizielle Top 100)	31
Irish Albums (IRMA)	67
Italian Albums (FIMI)	91
Lithuanian Albums (AGATA)	37
New Zealand Albums (RMNZ)	25
Polish Albums (ZPAV)	25
Scottish Albums (Official Charts)	4
Spanish Albums (Promusicae)	73
Swiss Albums (Schweizer Hitparade)	12
UK Albums (Official Charts)	1
US Heatseekers Albums (Billboard)	12
US Top Album Sales (Billboard)	81
US Top Current Album Sales (Billboard)	46

== Certifications ==
Certifications for Dead Club City
Region	Certification	Certified units/sales
United Kingdom (BPI)	Silver	60,000^{‡}
^{‡} Sales+streaming figures based on certification alone.
