= Alex Hepburn =

British singer and songwriter

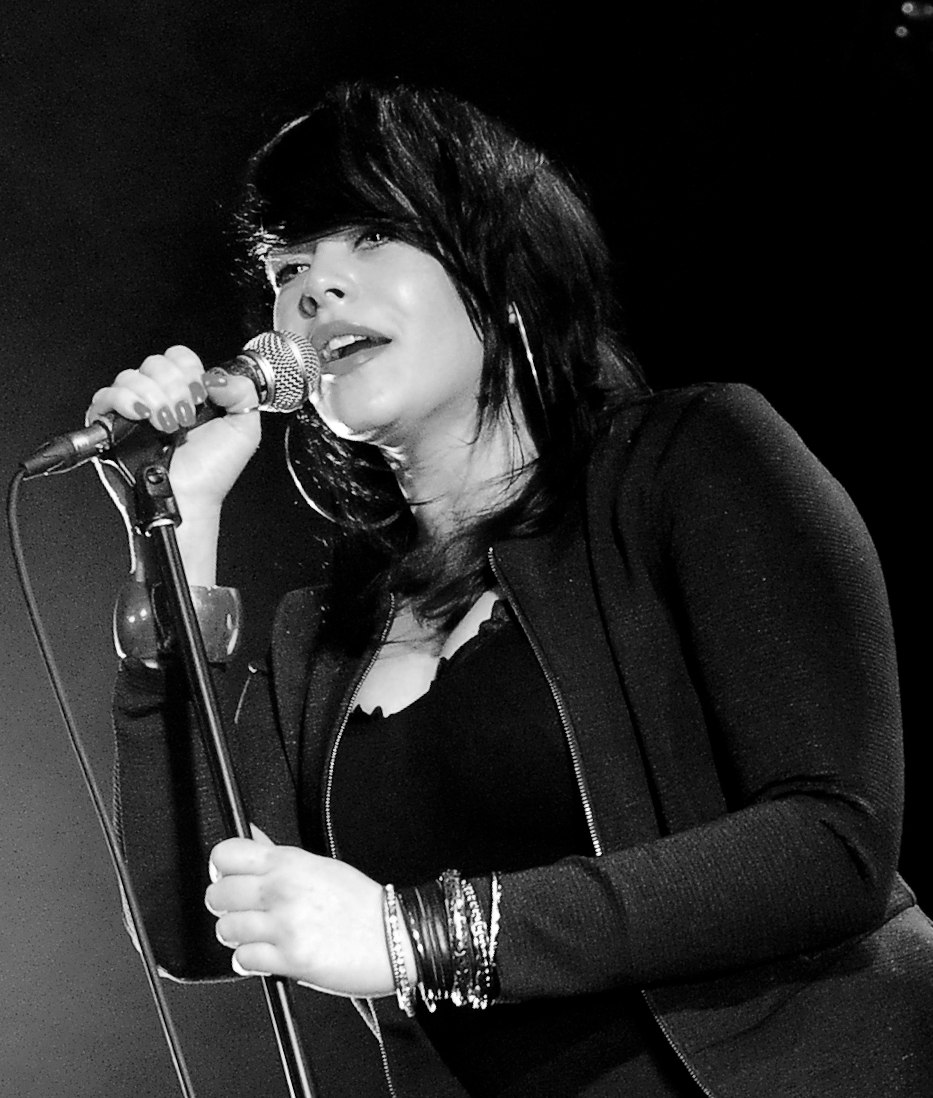

Alex Hepburn is a British singer and songwriter. She has released two studio albums, Together Alone (2013) and Things I've Seen (2019).

== Career ==
Hepburn released her eponymous debut EP in June 2012. In April 2013, she released her debut studio album Together Alone. In 2019, she released her second studio album, Things I've Seen, produced by Eg White.

Hepburn supported Bruno Mars on some dates of his Doo-Wops & Hooligans tour, including when he performed at British Summer Time in 2018, in Hyde Park, London.

She has also opened for Lianne La Havas, Alex Clare, Texas, Amy Macdonald, James Morrison and headlined three European tours.

== Discography ==
=== Albums ===
List of albums, with selected chart positions
Title	Album details	Peak chart positions						Certifications
Title	Album details	AUT	BEL (Fl)	BEL (Wa)	FRA	GER	SWI	Certifications
Together Alone	Released: April 15, 2013; Label: Warner Music; Formats: CD, digital download, streaming	36	36	15	3	23	2	IFPI SWI: Gold; SNEP: Gold
Things I've Seen	Released: April 19, 2019; Label: Parlophone, Warner Music; Formats: digital download, streaming	—	—	—	68	—	46	
"—" denotes a recording that did not chart or was not released in that territory.

=== EPs ===
- Alex Hepburn (2012)
- If You Stay (2018)

=== Singles ===
List of singles, with selected chart positions
Title	Year	Peak chart positions								Certifications	Album
Title	Year	AUT	BEL (Fl)	BEL (Wa)	CZE	FRA	GER	POL	SWI	Certifications	Album
"Under"	2013	62	10	2	1	2	34	2	5	BEA: Gold; IFPI SWI: Platinum; SNEP: Gold	Together Alone
"Miss Misery"	2013	—	—	—	—	131	—	14	63		Together Alone
"—" denotes a recording that did not chart or was not released in that territory.

==== More singles ====
- I Believe (2018)
- Take Home to Mama (2019)
- Fantasy (2023) [with Azteck, PS1]
- Anybody Out There (2023) [with Hardwell, Azteck]
- I'm A Woman (2023) [with ESSEL]

=== Other charted songs ===
List of other charted songs, with selected chart positions
Title	Year	Peak chart positions	Album
Title	Year	FRA	Album
"Broken Record"	2013	90	Together Alone
"Woman"	2013	117	Together Alone
"Pain Is"	2013	132	Together Alone
