= Sweet Serendipity =

Single by Lee DeWyze

from the album Live It Up
- Released: October 13, 2010
- Recorded: 2010
- Genre: Pop rock
- Length: 3:19
- Label: RCA
- Songwriters: Lee DeWyze, David Glass, Jordan Lawhead
- Producer: David Glass

Lee DeWyze singles chronology
"Beautiful Day" (2010)	"Sweet Serendipity" (2010)	"Beautiful Like You" (2011)

"Sweet Serendipity" is Lee DeWyze's first single from his post-American Idol debut album Live It Up. The song debuted on radio on October 13, 2010 and was released for sale at digital music vendors on October 25, 2010.

== Background ==
The original single was to be the album title track "Live It Up," but the single was changed a few days before its release. The song premiered on On Air with Ryan Seacrest. The song went for adds on hot adult contemporary radio stations on October 25, 2010 and became available for download at digital music vendors on October 26, 2010.

== Promotion ==
DeWyze performed on various talk shows including Good Morning America, Live with Regis and Kelly, The Ellen DeGeneres Show and The Tonight Show with Jay Leno to promote the single.

== Music video ==
The music video for the single was released on VH1 on November 15, 2010. The video was directed by Matt Stawski, who also directed the video for Train's "Hey, Soul Sister". The video features DeWyze, along with actress Jonna Walsh, whom DeWyze later married in July 2012, and DeWyze's band members.

== Reception ==
=== Critical reception ===
Billboard describes “Sweet Serendipity” as a song that “offers an uplifting message about believing in destiny” and notes that “the song’s bridge and climax [bring] John Mayer’s early material to mind.”

=== Commercial performance ===
The single sold over 18,000 copies in its first week of release and has sold a total of 44,000 copies as of December 8, 2010.

== Charts ==
Chart (2010–11)	Peak position
US Billboard Adult Pop Songs	23

== In other media ==
The song is included on the compilation album American Idol 10th Anniversary – The Hits, released on March 15, 2011.

== Release history ==
Region	Date	Format
United States	October 13, 2010	Radio airplay
United States	October 26, 2010	Digital download
