= Overcome (Nothing But Thieves song) =

Single by Nothing but Thieves

from the album Dead Club City
- Released: 10 May 2023
- Genre: Synth-pop; alternative rock
- Length: 3:34
- Label: Sony UK
- Songwriters: Joseph Langridge-Brown; Dominic Craik; Conor Mason
- Producers: Dominic Craik; Jonathan Gilmore

Nothing but Thieves singles chronology
"Welcome to the DCC" (2023)	"Overcome" (2023)	"Keeping You Around" (2023)

Music video
- "Overcome" on YouTube

"Overcome" is a song recorded by English alternative rock band Nothing but Thieves from their fourth studio album, Dead Club City (2023). The song was released by Sony UK on 10 May 2023, as the second single off the album. It peaked at number six on the Dutch Top 40, number 25 on the Billboard Alternative Airplay chart, number 36 on the UK Singles Sales Chart and number 44 in the Ultratop 50.

It was later voted as Record of the Year 2023 by Radio X listeners and is currently the longest lasting song on Dutch radio station NPO 3FM's "De Verlanglijst" chart, being voted for by listeners for over a year.

== Background ==
In a press release, the band depicted the feeling of "Overcome" akin to the journey of a road trip, as a "throw your stuff in a bag and get away" song, and that "Dead Club City (the city) would definitely feel enticing for someone like that". Continuing on, the band described the song's overall role within the rest of the album, with it being the main motive for the fictional characters within the DCC world to move to the city itself; and therefore "having a song on the album that would describe why someone would want change" felt like the right decision for the band.

== Music video ==
The official music video for "Overcome" was released onto YouTube on 11 May 2023, directed by Teeeezy C.

== Track listing ==
Digital download
No.	Title	Length
1.	"Overcome"	3:34
2.	"Welcome to the DCC"	3:17

== Charts ==
=== Weekly charts ===
Weekly chart performance for "Overcome"
Chart (2023)	Peak position
Belgium (Ultratop 50 Flanders)	44
Finland (Suomen virallinen lista)	93
Netherlands (Dutch Top 40)	6
Netherlands (Single Top 100)	29
UK Singles Downloads (OCC)	34
UK Singles Sales (OCC)	36
US Alternative Airplay (Billboard)	25

=== Year-end charts ===
Year-end chart performance for "Overcome"
Chart (2023)	Position
Netherlands (Dutch Top 40)	3

== Certifications ==
Certifications for Overcome
Region	Certification	Certified units/sales
Netherlands (NVPI)	Gold	46,500^{‡}
^{‡} Sales+streaming figures based on certification alone.
