= Lee DeWyze =

American singer-songwriter

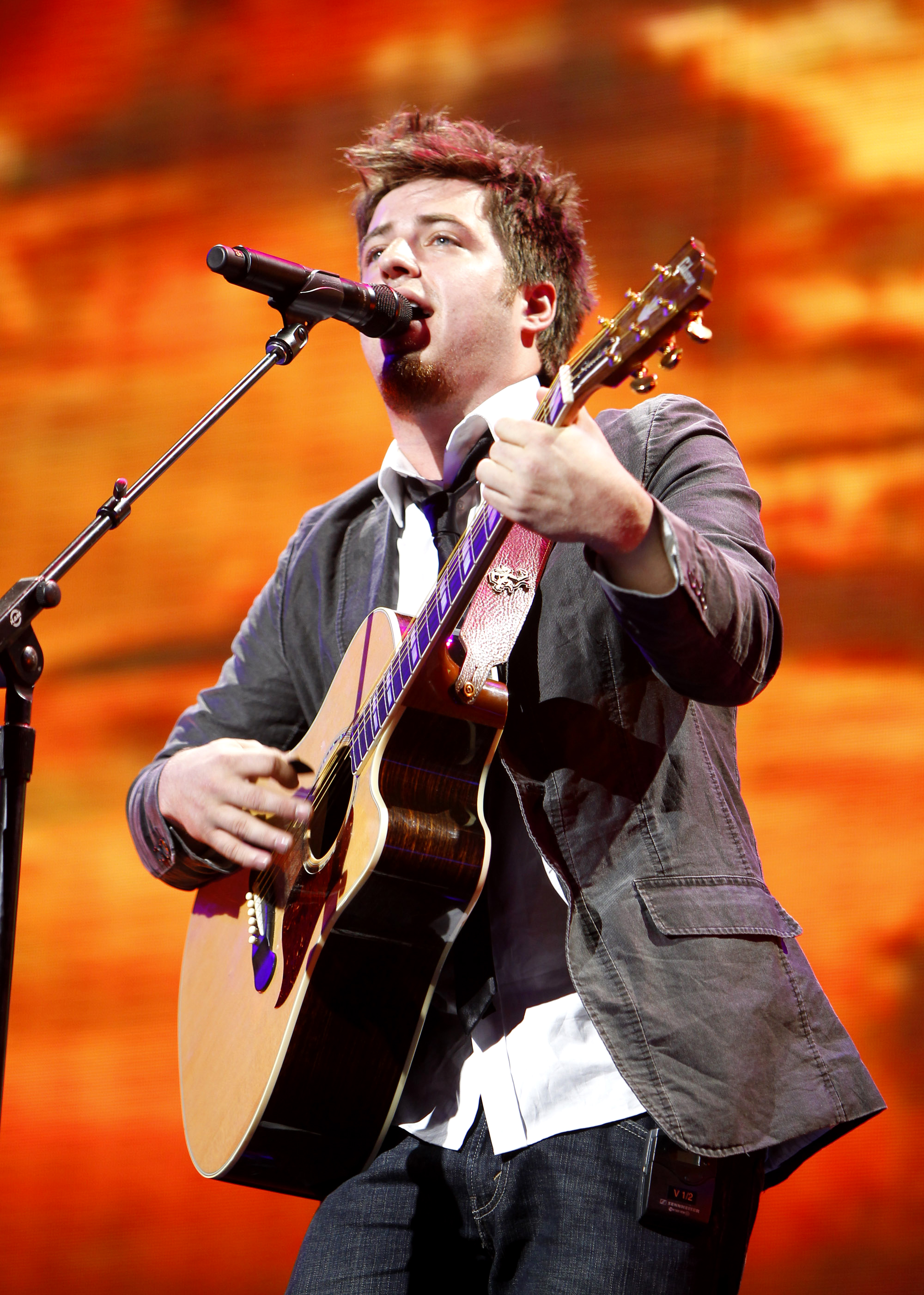
- DeWyze performing in June 2010.

Background information
- Born: Leon James DeWyze Jr. April 2, 1986 (age 40); Mount Prospect, Illinois, US
- Genres: Rock; pop; pop rock; alternative rock; indie rock; folk rock
- Occupation: Singer-songwriter
- Instruments: Vocals; guitar; piano; drums; bass
- Years active: 2003–present
- Labels: WuLi; RCA; 19; Vanguard
- Formerly of: Lee DeWyze Band
- Website: leedewyzeofficial.com

Leon James "Lee" DeWyze Jr. (born April 2, 1986) is an American singer-songwriter and the winner of the ninth season of American Idol.

Prior to Idol, DeWyze had a solo career and formed the Lee DeWyze Band. He had also released two independent albums called So I'm Told in 2007 and Slumberland in 2010, both on WuLi Records.

DeWyze's first post-Idol album Live It Up was released on November 16, 2010, through RCA Records. The album featured the single "Sweet Serendipity", which peaked at #24 on the Billboard Hot 100.

== Background ==
DeWyze was born in Mount Prospect, Illinois, the eldest son of Kathleen (née Donahue) and Leon (Lee) DeWyze Sr., who worked as a postal carrier in Elk Grove Village, Illinois. He has two older sisters, Shannon and Sarah, and a younger brother, Michael. His musical influences include Cat Stevens, Eric Clapton, Ben Harper, and Simon & Garfunkel.

DeWyze attended St. James School in Arlington Heights, Illinois, and Prospect High School in Mount Prospect, Illinois, up until his senior year, when he was expelled after being involved in too many fights. After leaving Prospect High, he attended Forest View Alternative School in Arlington Heights, having been inspired both by his teachers and his interest in music to return to his studies. While he never graduated from either high school, he eventually got his GED.

After being expelled from Prospect High School, DeWyze worked as a paint salesman at Mount Prospect Paint in Mount Prospect. He also worked as a trading floor clerk at the Chicago Mercantile Exchange from 2007 to 2008 before returning to the paint store, where he remained until he auditioned for American Idol and advanced to the show's Hollywood rounds. Mount Prospect Paint continued to support DeWyze during his American Idol run by selling t-shirts encouraging fans to vote for him.

== Career ==
=== Early career ===
DeWyze started singing at an early age and was discovered by Louis Svitek, who saw the then-17-year-old DeWyze playing guitar and singing at a house party in the northwest suburbs of Chicago. Svitek signed DeWyze to WuLi Records, an independent record label Chicago-based label he runs with Ryan McGuire. Dewyze formed the Lee DeWyze Band with Svitek, McGuire and Jeff Henderson.

DeWyze recorded two albums, So I'm Told (2007) and Slumberland (2010), both produced by McGuire. WuLi released a remixed and remastered edition of So I'm Told in 2010. In 2008, as a favor to band member Jeff Henderson, DeWyze and the band recorded a disc for Square One Organic Baby Food Company, a company owned by Henderson's wife. DeWyze recorded six songs on the "Square One Organic" promotional CD, also produced by Ryan McGuire.

As a result of touring in the area and performing at many venues, DeWyze and his band became locally known, receiving airplay on WXRT. The Lee DeWyze Band was featured on the local television sports program The Chicago Huddle on WLS-TV during its 2008 and 2009 seasons.

=== American Idol ===
DeWyze auditioned at the United Center in Chicago for the ninth season of American Idol on June 22, 2009, after encouragement from his friend Vincent Ferrara, who was also trying out for the contest in Chicago. DeWyze auditioned with the song "Ain't No Sunshine". He was one of thirteen people from Chicago, the lowest number out of all seven audition cities, to make it through to the show's Hollywood Week.

During Hollywood Week, DeWyze was placed in a group that included Aaron Kelly and Crystal Bowersox, all of whom made the Top 5. DeWyze defeated Bowersox and was crowned the winner on May 26, 2010.

DeWyze's closest friend among the competitors is Andrew Garcia, who was his roommate throughout the season until he was eliminated in the Top 9.

DeWyze was one of two contestants in the ninth season to never land in the bottom three, the other being Bowersox. The judges praised him for shedding his shy persona throughout the season and showing, with confidence, that he was "in it to win it."

On May 14, 2010, DeWyze performed at the Arlington Park Race Track in Arlington Heights, Illinois, with more than 41,000 people attending as part of his American Idol Homecoming day. The day also included parade in Mount Prospect, a performance at an AT&T store in Skokie, Illinois, and DeWyze throwing out the opening pitch at a Chicago Cubs baseball game.

==== Performances/results ====
| Episode | Theme | Song choice | Original artist | Order # | Result |
|---|---|---|---|---|---|
| Audition | Auditioner's Choice | "Ain't No Sunshine" | Bill Withers | N/A | Advanced |
| Hollywood | First Solo | "One of Us" | Joan Osborne | N/A | Advanced |
| Hollywood | Group Performance | "Get Ready" | The Temptations | N/A | Advanced |
| Hollywood | Second Solo | "You Found Me" | The Fray | N/A | Advanced |
| Top 24 (12 Men) | Billboard Hot 100 Hits | "Chasing Cars" | Snow Patrol | 7 | Safe |
| Top 20 (10 Men) | Billboard Hot 100 Hits | "Lips of an Angel" | Hinder | 10 | Safe |
| Top 16 (8 Men) | Billboard Hot 100 Hits | "Fireflies" | Owl City | 1 | Safe |
| Top 12 | The Rolling Stones | "Beast of Burden" | The Rolling Stones | 9 | Safe |
| Top 11 | Billboard No. 1 Hits | "The Letter" | The Box Tops | 1 | Safe |
| Top 10 | R&B/Soul | "Treat Her Like a Lady"^{1} | Cornelius Brothers & Sister Rose | 8 | Safe |
| Top 9 | Lennon–McCartney | "Hey Jude" | The Beatles | 9 | Safe |
| Top 9^{2} | Elvis Presley | "A Little Less Conversation" | Elvis Presley | 4 | Safe |
| Top 7 | Inspirational Songs | "The Boxer" | Simon & Garfunkel | 2 | Safe |
| Top 6 | Shania Twain | "You're Still the One" | Shania Twain | 1 | Safe |
| Top 5 | Frank Sinatra | "That's Life" | Frank Sinatra | 5 | Safe |
| Top 4 | Songs of the Cinema | Solo "Kiss from a Rose" — Batman Forever | Seal | 1 | Safe |
| Top 4 | Songs of the Cinema | Duet "Falling Slowly" — Once with Crystal Bowersox | Glen Hansard & Markéta Irglová | 3 | Safe |
| Top 3 | Contestant's Choice | "Simple Man" | Lynyrd Skynyrd | 3 | Safe |
| Top 3 | Judges' Choice^{3} | "Hallelujah" | Leonard Cohen | 6 | Safe |
| Top 2 | Contestant's Choice | "The Boxer" | Simon & Garfunkel | 1 | Winner |
| Top 2 | Simon Fuller's Choice | "Everybody Hurts" | R.E.M. | 3 | Winner |
| Top 2 | Coronation song | "Beautiful Day" | U2 | 5 | Winner |

- ^Note 1 Song included on American Idol Season 9 compilation album.
- ^Note 2 Due to the judges using their one save to save Michael Lynche, the Top 9 remained intact for another week.
- ^Note 3 Song selected by Simon Cowell.

=== RCA Records (2010–2011) ===
DeWyze's Idol coronation song, a cover of U2's "Beautiful Day", was released as a digital single on May 27, 2010. He signed with Simon Fuller's 19 Entertainment and RCA Records. DeWyze performed the national anthem at the Staples Center before Game 2 of the 2010 NBA Finals on June 6, 2010. As a result of winning American Idol, he became the headliner of the 2010 American Idols LIVE! tour. The songs he chose to perform for the tour include "Beautiful Day", "Rocket Man", "Treat Her Like a Lady", "Hallelujah", and "Use Somebody".

DeWyze won "Choice TV: Male Reality/Variety Star" at the Teen Choice Awards in 2010. He returned to Arlington Park for a post-Idol homecoming concert on September 24, 2010, where he performed for more than 20,000 people. His 12-song set of cover songs and pre-Idol originals also included a new song, "Only Dreaming". On January 23, 2011, DeWyze performed at halftime during the NFC Championship Game between the Chicago Bears and Green Bay Packers at Soldier Field in Chicago.

In July 2010, DeWyze described his upcoming album:

"It's gonna be like a whole rock/pop sort of deal. It's gonna be very chill rock, a little harder stuff. It's gonna be my vibe — stuff I would have done from day one and what I've always done."

On October 7, 2010, DeWyze announced that his major studio debut album, scheduled for a November 16, 2010, release, would be called Live It Up and the first single, also called "Live It Up", would debut October 13 on On Air with Ryan Seacrest. On October 12, DeWyze announced that his single "Live It Up" would be held off for release. Instead a new single titled "Sweet Serendipity" aired in its place on October 13. The album Live It Up was released on November 16. DeWyze performed the second single, "Beautiful Like You", on the American Idol Season 10 Top 12 Results show on March 17, 2011.

On October 6, 2011, RCA Records CEO Peter Edge confirmed that DeWyze was no longer on the label. DeWyze was the last of a nine-year partnership between Idol, 19 Recordings and Sony Music, which had an exclusive license on the show's music releases. DeWyze's option officially expired in September.

WuLi Records, citing demand from DeWyze's fan base, has released a third album of pre-Idol recordings, What Once Was, on February 14, 2012. The album has a total of nine tracks. DeWyze started his "Acoustic Duo Tour" on October 26, 2012.

=== Vanguard Records and Frames (2013–14) ===
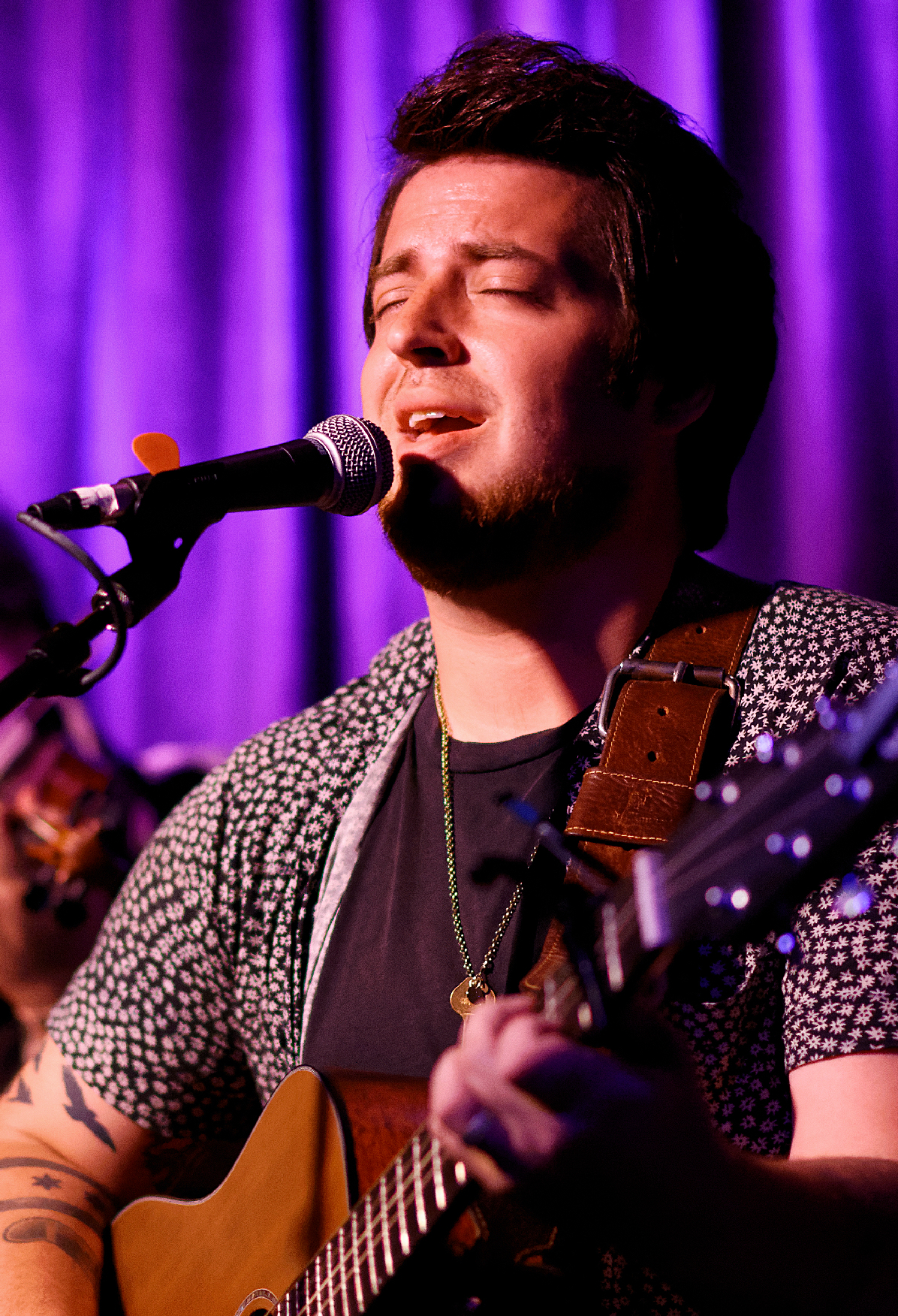
Performing in 2016

On January 15, 2013, DeWyze announced that he had signed with Vanguard Records. His first single with the label, "Silver Lining" was originally scheduled to be released to Triple A radio on June 10 and be available digitally the following day. However, the single's release date was pushed up and was released to digital retailers on April 24, 2013.

On May 30, 2013, DeWyze announced the title, track listing and release date of his new album, Frames which was released on August 20, 2013.

On March 9, 2014, a song by DeWyze called "Blackbird Song" was used in the TV series The Walking Dead. According to The Fresno Bee, it was the second most viral song on Spotify in the United States that week. The song debuted on Billboard's "Pop Digital Songs" chart at number twenty-nine. The song was used on a sixth-season episode of Suits in 2017.

=== Independent (2016–present) ===
DeWyze's third major studio album, Oil & Water was released through Shanachie Entertainment and Pledgemusic on February 12, 2016. It was led by the single "Stone" whose music video premiered April 8, 2016. It was directed by Gabriel Younes, starring actor Harwood Gordon, and filmed near Big Bear Lake.

His follow-up album Paranoia was released on February 16, 2018 and was led by the single "The Breakdown" which was featured in Showtime's hit series Shameless. An EP, Castles was released on October 25, 2019. Post-album release, DeWyze completed multiple tours across the US, in addition to licensing songs to various television projects and films, including landing the theme song for the 2020 film The Secret: Dare to Dream with the single "Horizon."

His fifth major studio album Ghost Stories was released digitally on August 13, 2021, and was led by the singles "Weeds" and "Victims of the Night."

In 2024, he premiered a new single "Devil in the Details" as well his sixth major studio album Gone For Days which was released on August 23, 2024.

== Philanthropy ==
DeWyze has been involved with several charity organizations. In July 2012, he teamed with The Heart Foundation's "One for the Heart" Campaign, offering his song "Fight" as a free download to those who donated to the organization. He has twice performed at the Gateway for Cancer Research's annual Cures Gala charity event; once in November 2012 and once in October 2013.

In September 2012, DeWyze performed at Stars on Staff, a charity event held by Music in Schools Today. In November of that year, he performed at the 2013 IP Summit – an event promoting the protection of intellectual property rights, which was held by the Global Intellectual Property Center at the U.S. Chamber of Commerce. That December, DeWyze performed at Kringle Mingle, a fundraiser event for the Covenant HealthCare's Covenant Kids Foundation. The following year, in February, he performed at the Chicago Auto Show's First Look for Charity, raising funds for various local charities.

== Personal life ==
DeWyze has several tattoos. On his arm, there is a tattoo reading "Lord, my body has been a good friend but I won't need it when I reach the end," lyrics from "Miles From Nowhere" by Cat Stevens. Other art includes a silhouette of the Chicago flag and tree of life on his right arm and a Shel Silverstein illustration on his left arm.

On July 27, 2011, DeWyze announced his engagement to model and actress Jonna Walsh. The couple married on July 21, 2012. DeWyze and Walsh met on the set for the music video of his single "Sweet Serendipity".

== Discography ==
=== Albums ===
| Year | Album details | Chart Peak | | | | | | | | Sales |
| Year | Album details | US | US Digital | US Heat | US Indie | US Folk | US Rock | CAN | UK | Sales |
|---|---|---|---|---|---|---|---|---|---|---|
| 2007 | So I'm Told: Released: July 7, 2007 October 25, 2010 (Remastered Edition); Label: WuLi; Format: CD, Digital Download | — | — | — | — | — | — | — | — | |
| 2010 | Slumberland: Released: January 7, 2010 (iTunes) January 20, 2010 (physical release); Label: WuLi; Format: CD, Digital Download | — | — | 7 | 39 | — | — | — | — | US: 17,000 |
| 2010 | Live It Up: Released: November 16, 2010; Label: RCA, 19; Format: CD, Digital Download | 19 | 10 | — | — | — | — | 79 | 122 | US: 153,000 |
| 2012 | What Once Was: Released: February 14, 2012; Label: WuLi; Format: CD, Digital Download | — | — | — | — | — | — | — | — | |
| 2013 | Frames: Released: August 20, 2013; Label: Vanguard Records; Format: CD, Digital Download | 116 | — | — | — | — | 38 | — | — | US: 3,000 |
| 2016 | Oil & Water: Released: February 12, 2016; Label: Shanchie Records; Format: CD, Digital Download | — | — | — | 19 | 8 | 30 | — | — | |
| 2018 | Paranoia: Released: February 16, 2018; Label: Shanchie Records; Format: CD, Digital Download, LP, Cassette | — | — | — | — | — | — | — | — | |
| 2021 | Ghost Stories: Released: August 31, 2021; Label: Mavelle Records; Format: Digital Download | — | — | — | — | — | — | — | — | |
| 2024 | Gone For Days: Released: August 23, 2024; Label: Mavelle Records; Format: Digital Download | — | — | — | — | — | — | — | — | |
"—" denotes releases that did not chart

=== Digital albums ===
| Year | Album | Peak | | Sales |
| Year | Album | US Heat | US Indie | Sales |
|---|---|---|---|---|
| 2010 | Season 9 Favorite Performances | 9 | 40 | US: 5,000 |

=== Singles ===
| Year | Single | Peak | | | Sales | Album |
| Year | Single | US | US Adult | CAN | Sales | Album |
|---|---|---|---|---|---|---|
| 2010 | "Beautiful Day" | 24 | — | 13 | US: 186,000 | non-album single |
| 2010 | "Sweet Serendipity" | — (Note: "Sweet Serendipity" did not enter the Billboard Hot 100, but peaked at number 11 on the Bubbling Under Hot 100 chart.) | 23 | 96 | US: 44,000 | Live It Up |
| 2011 | "Beautiful Like You" | — | — | — | | Live It Up |
| 2013 | "Silver Lining" | — | — | — | US: 11,000 | Frames |
| 2013 | "Fight" | — | 37 | — | | Frames |
| 2014 | "Blackbird Song" | — | — | — | | The Walking Dead (AMC Original Soundtrack), Vol. 2 |
| 2016 | "Stone" | — | — | — | | Oil & Water |
| 2016 | "Again" | — | — | — | | Oil & Water |
| 2018 | "The Breakdown" | — | — | — | | Paranoia |
| 2020 | "Horizon" | — | — | — | | The Secret: Dare To Dream (Soundtrack) |
| 2021 | "Weeds" | — | — | — | | Ghost Stories |
| 2021 | "Victims of the Night" | — | — | — | | Ghost Stories |
| 2024 | "Devil in the Details" | — | — | — | | Gone For Days |
"—" denotes releases that did not chart

=== Digital singles ===
| Year | Single | Peak | | Album |
| Year | Single | US | CAN | Album |
|---|---|---|---|---|
| 2010 | "Hallelujah" | 44 | 57 | Season 9 Favorite Performances |
| 2010 | "Falling Slowly" (with Crystal Bowersox) | 66 | 70 | non-album single |
| 2010 | "The Boxer" | 88 | 72 | Season 9 Favorite Performances |
| 2010 | "Everybody Hurts" | — (Note: "Everybody Hurts" did not enter the Billboard Hot 100, but peaked at number 4 on the Bubbling Under Hot 100 chart.) | — | non-album single |
"—" denotes releases that did not chart

=== Collaborations ===
- 2008: Square One Organic Baby Food Company promotional CD (6 of the songs are sung by Lee DeWyze).

== Awards and nominations ==
| Year | Presenter | Award | Result |
|---|---|---|---|
| 2010 | 2010 Teen Choice Awards | Male Reality/Variety Star | Won |

== See also ==
- List of Idols winners
