= Julian Emery =

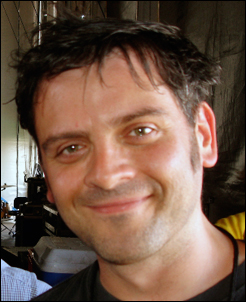

Background information
- Origin: London
- Genres: Pop; rock
- Years active: 2000–present

Julian Emery is a British musician, producer and songwriter, best known for his work with McFly, Nothing But Thieves, Lissie and Ruth Lorenzo.

== Early life ==
Emery was raised and educated in Buckinghamshire, the son of classical musician Terry Emery and brother of actor Tania Emery.

Inspired by rock bands like Rush and AC/DC, Emery began his career as a rock guitar player, but while still in his teens, gained production experience making albums of the scores to popular musicals.

== Career ==
In the late 1990s, Emery was one of Britain's most prominent session guitarists, appearing on stage and on record with many pop acts, including Enrique Iglesias, Atomic Kitten, Kym Marsh, Blue and Annie Lennox.

In 2005, he developed a partnership with the former lead singer of British rock band, A, Jason Perry. They co-wrote and produced Don't Let It Go To Waste, the solo album by Matt Willis, formerly of Busted in 2006. The album produced one top 10 and two top 20 singles that year. The team co-wrote and produced Motion in the Ocean by McFly, which went platinum in the UK and included three No 1 singles including Please Please, Stargirl and Transylvania.

Since then Emery has emerged as a songwriter and producer, dividing his time between the UK and US. Julian is Managed by Mark Wood, Radius Music Ltd.

== Discography ==
| Year | Artist | Album | Song | Co-written with | Notes | Chart Position |
|---|---|---|---|---|---|---|
| 2023 | Nothing But Thieves | "Dead Club City" | "Welcome To The DCC" | Jim Irvin, Nothing But Thieves | | |
| 2018 | Dana Jean Phoenix | "Synthetic Life" (single) | Synthetic Life | Adam Noble, James Hockley | | |
| 2017 | Nothing But Thieves | "Broken Machine" | I Was Just A Kid | Nothing But Thieves, Jim Irvin | | #2 UK Album |
| 2017 | Nothing But Thieves | "Broken Machine" | Sorry | Nothing But Thieves, Jim Irvin | | #2 UK Album |
| 2017 | Nothing But Thieves | "Broken Machine" | Broken Machine | Nothing But Thieves, Jim Irvin | | #2 UK Album |
| 2017 | Nothing But Thieves | "Broken Machine" | I'm Not Made By Design | Nothing But Thieves, Jim Irvin | | #2 UK Album |
| 2017 | Nothing But Thieves | "Broken Machine" | Get Better | Nothing But Thieves, Jim Irvin | | #2 UK Album |
| 2017 | Nothing But Thieves | "Broken Machine" | Hell Yeah | Nothing But Thieves, Jim Irvin | | #2 UK Album |
| 2017 | Airways | "Starting To Spin" EP | "Starting To Spin" | Jim Irvin, Jake Daniels and Brian Morone | Producer | |
| 2017 | Airways | "Starting To Spin" EP | "White Noise Boys" | Jim Irvin, Jake Daniels and Brian Morone | Producer | |
| 2017 | Airways | "Starting To Spin" EP | "One Foot" | Jim Irvin, Jake Daniels and Brian Morone | Producer | |
| 2017 | Airways | "Starting To Spin" EP | "Reckless Tongue" | - | Producer | |
| 2017 | Airways | "Starting To Spin" EP | "Mate" | - | Producer | |
| 2015 | Lissie | "My Wild West" | "Ojai" | Lissie and Jim Irvin | | #16 UK Album #9 Norwegian Albums |
| 2015 | Nothing But Thieves | "Nothing But Thieves" | "Excuse Me" | Dom Craik, Conor Mason, Joseph Brown and Jim Irvin | Producer | #7 Album UK |
| 2015 | Nothing But Thieves | "Nothing But Thieves" | "Graveyard Whistling" | Dom Craik, Conor Mason, Joseph Brown and Jim Irvin | Producer | #7 Album UK |
| 2015 | Nothing But Thieves | "Nothing But Thieves" | "Hostage" | Dom Craik, Conor Mason, Joseph Brown and Jim Irvin | Producer | #7 Album UK |
| 2015 | Nothing But Thieves | "Nothing But Thieves" | "Trip Switch" | Dom Craik, Conor Mason, Joseph Brown and Jim Irvin | Producer | #1 US Single Alternative Songs – Billboard |
| 2015 | Nothing But Thieves | "Nothing But Thieves" | "Tempt You (Evocatio)" | Dom Craik, Conor Mason, Joseph Brown and Jim Irvin | Producer | #7 Album UK |
| 2015 | Nothing But Thieves | "Nothing But Thieves" | "Neon Brother" | Dom Craik, Conor Mason, Joseph Brown and Jim Irvin | Producer | #7 Album UK |
| 2015 | Nothing But Thieves | "Nothing But Thieves" | "Hanging" | - | Producer | #7 Album UK |
| 2015 | Nothing But Thieves | "Nothing But Thieves" | "Ban All The Music" | - | Producer | #7 Album UK |
| 2015 | Nothing But Thieves | "Nothing But Thieves" | "Wake Up Call" | - | Producer | #7 Album UK |
| 2015 | Nothing But Thieves | "Nothing But Thieves" | "Itch" | - | Producer | #7 Album UK |
| 2015 | Nothing But Thieves | "Nothing But Thieves" | "If I Get High" | - | Producer | #7 Album UK |
| 2015 | Nothing But Thieves | "Nothing But Thieves" | "Lover, Please Stay" | - | Producer | #7 Album UK |
| 2015 | Nothing But Thieves | "Nothing But Thieves" | "Painkiller" | - | Producer | #7 Album UK |
| 2015 | Nothing But Thieves | "Nothing But Thieves" | "Honey Whiskey" | - | Producer | #7 Album UK |
| 2014 | Nothing but Thieves | "Graveyard Whistling EP" | "Graveyard Whistling" | Jim Irvin, Nothing but Thieves | Producer | |
| 2014 | Nothing but Thieves | "Graveyard Whistling EP" | "Emergency" | Jim Irvin, Nothing but Thieves | Producer | |
| 2014 | Nothing but Thieves | "Graveyard Whistling EP" | "Itch" | Jim Irvin, Nothing but Thieves | Producer | |
| 2014 | Nothing but Thieves | "Graveyard Whistling EP" | "Last Orders" | Jim Irvin, Nothing but Thieves | Producer | |
| 2014 | Nothing but Thieves | "Wake Up Call" (single) | "Wake Up Call" | | Producer | |
| 2014 | Plain White T's | "Should’ve Gone to Bed" | "Should've Gone To Bed" | Tom Higgenson, Hillary Lindsey | | |
| 2014 | Ruth Lorenzo | "Planeta Azul" | "Dancing in the Rain" | Jim Irvin, Ruth Lorenzo | | |
| 2014 | Chlöe Howl | "Rumour" (Single) | "Rumour" | Jim Irvin, Chlöe Howl | Producer | |
| 2014 | Lewis Watson | "The Morning" | "The Morning" | Jim Irvin, Lewis Watson | Producer | |
| 2014 | Lewis Watson | "The Morning" | "Stones Around The Sun" | Jim Irvin, Lewis Watson | Producer | UK #28 |
| 2014 | Lower Than Atlantis | "Lower Than Atlantis" | "Live Slow, Die Old" | Jim Irvin, Mike Duce | | |
| 2014 | Lower Than Atlantis | "Lower Than Atlantis" | "Time" | Jim Irvin, Mike Duce | | |
| 2014 | Lower Than Atlantis | "Lower Than Atlantis" | "Number 1" | Jim Irvin, Mike Duce | | |
| 2013 | Lissie | "Back To Forever" | "Shameless" | Jim Irvin, Lissie | | Album UK #16 |
| 2013 | Lissie | "Back To Forever" | "Further Away (Romance Police)" | Jim Irvin, Lissie | | |
| 2013 | Lissie | "Back To Forever" | "The Habit" | Jim Irvin, Lissie | | |
| 2013 | Lissie | "Back To Forever" | "What's It Like" | Jim Irvin, Lissie | | |
| 2013 | Alex Hepburn | "Together Alone" | "Get Heavy" | Jim Irvin, Alex Hepburn | | France #2 |
| 2013 | Alex Hepburn | "Together Alone" | "Crown of Thorns" | Jim Irvin, Alex Hepburn | | |
| 2013 | Fenech Soler | ”Rituals” | ”Magnetic" | Andrew Robert Lindsay, Benjamin John Duffy, Ross Alasdair Duffy, Daniel Fenech Soler, Jon Green, Stefan Storm, Daniel Zak Watts | | |
| 2013 | Fenech Soler | ”Rituals” | "Fading" | Andrew Robert Lindsay, Benjamin John Duffy, Ross Alasdair Duffy, Daniel Fenech Soler, Jon Green | | |
| 2013 | Gabrielle Aplin | "English Rain" | "Start of Time" | Jim Irvin, Gabrielle Aplin | | UK #2 |
| 2013 | Gavin DeGraw | "Make A Move" | "Every Little Bit" | Jim Irvin, Gavin Degraw | | US #10 |
| 2013 | Josh Krajcik | ”Blindly, Lonely, Lovely" | ”Her Song" | Jim Irvin, Josh Krajcik | Producer | |
| 2013 | Lee DeWyze | "Frames" | "You Don't Know Me" | Jim Irvin, Lee DeWyze | Producer | US #116 |
| 2013 | Ryan Beatty | "Chameleon" (single) | "Chameleon" | Jim Irvin, Ryan Beatty, Elisabeth Maurus | Producer | |
| 2013 | Ryan Beatty | "Chameleon" (single) | "Love will come my way" | Jim Irvin, Ryan Beatty, Elisabeth Maurus | Producer | |
| 2013 | Skillet | ”Rise" | ”Battlecry" | John Cooper, Claude Kelly | | |
| 2012 | Various Cruelties | ”Various Cruelties" | ”Beautiful Delerium" | Jim Irvin, Liam O'Donnell | | |
| 2012 | Audra Mae and The Almighty Sounds | ”Audra Mae and The Almighty Sounds" | "Jebidiah Moonshine's Friday Night Shack Party" | Jim Irvin, Audra Mae | | |
| 2012 | Halestorm | "The Strange Case Of..." | "Rock Show" | Jim Irvin, Lzzy Hale | | US #15 |
| 2012 | Halestorm | "The Strange Case Of..." | "Don’t Know How To Stop" | Jim Irvin, Lzzy Hale | | |
| 2012 | Jack Savoretti | ”Before the Storm" | "Lifetime" | Jim Irvin, Jack Savoretti | | |
| 2011 | Simple Plan | "Get Your Heart On" | "Freaking Me Out" | Jim Irvin, Chuck Comeau, Pierre Bouvier | | CAN #2 |
| 2011 | Simple Plan | "Get Your Heart On" | "Astronaut" | Jim Irvin, Chuck Comeau, Pierre Bouvier | | |
| 2011 | Simple Plan | "Get Your Heart On" | "Fire in My Heart" | Jim Irvin, Chuck Comeau, Pierre Bouvier | | |
| 2011 | David Cook | "This Loud Morning" | "Paper Heart" | Jim Irvin, David Cook | | US #7 |
| 2011 | David Cook | "This Loud Morning" | "We Believe" | Jim Irvin, David Cook | | |
| 2010 | Lissie | "Catching a Tiger" | "When I'm Alone" | Jim Irvin, Lissie | | UK #12 GOLD, Norway #2 |
| 2010 | Lissie | "Catching a Tiger" | "In Sleep" | Jim Irvin, Lissie | | |
| 2010 | Lissie | "Catching a Tiger" | "Loosen The Knot" | Jim Irvin, Lissie | | |
| 2010 | Lissie | "Catching a Tiger" | "Cuckoo" | Jim Irvin, Lissie | | |
| 2010 | Boyzone | ”Brother” | ”Separate Cars" | Jim Irvin, Jack McManus, Jon Green | | UK #1 |
| 2006 | Matt Willis | ”Don’t Let It Go To Waste” | "Hey Kid" | Matt Willis, Jason Perry, John Kwiecinski | Producer | UK #11 |
| 2006 | Matt Willis | ”Don’t Let It Go To Waste” | "Luxury" | Matt Willis, Daniel P. Carter, | Producer | |
| 2006 | Matt Willis | ”Don’t Let It Go To Waste” | "Up All Night" | Matt Willis, Jason Perry | Producer | UK #7 |
| 2006 | Matt Willis | ”Don’t Let It Go To Waste” | "Sound of America" | Matt Willis, Jason Perry | Producer | |
| 2006 | Matt Willis | ”Don’t Let It Go To Waste” | "Ex Girlfriend" | Matt Willis, Jason Perry | Producer | |
| 2006 | Matt Willis | ”Don’t Let It Go To Waste” | "Don’t Let It Go To Waste" | Matt Willis, Jason Perry, Rick Parfitt Junior | Producer | UK #19 |
| 2006 | Matt Willis | ”Don’t Let It Go To Waste” | "From Myself Baby" | Matt Willis, Jason Perry | Producer | |
| 2006 | Matt Willis | ”Don’t Let It Go To Waste” | "Fade Out" | | Producer | |
| 2006 | Matt Willis | ”Don’t Let It Go To Waste” | "Who You Gonna Run To?" | Matt Willis, Jason Perry | Producer | |
| 2006 | Matt Willis | ”Don’t Let It Go To Waste” | "Get Bored" | Matt Willis, Jason Perry | Producer | |
| 2006 | Matt Willis | ”Don’t Let It Go To Waste” | "Falling into You" | Matt Willis, Jason Perry | Producer | |
| 2006 | Matt Willis | ”Don’t Let It Go To Waste” | "Me And Your Mother" | | Producer | |
| 2006 | McFly | "Motion in the Ocean" | "We Are The Young" | Jason Perry, Daniel P. Carter, Tom Fletcher, Daniel Jones | Producer | |
| 2006 | McFly | "Motion in the Ocean" | "Star Girl" | Jason Perry, Daniel P. Carter, Tom Fletcher, Daniel Jones | Producer | UK #1 |
| 2006 | McFly | "Motion in the Ocean" | "Please Please" | Jason Perry, Daniel P. Carter, Tom Fletcher, Daniel Jones | Producer | UK #1 |
| 2006 | McFly | "Motion in the Ocean" | "Sorry’s Not Good Enough" | Jason Perry, Daniel P. Carter, Tom Fletcher, Daniel Jones | Producer | UK #3 |
| 2006 | McFly | "Motion in the Ocean" | "Bubble Wrap" | | Producer | |
| 2006 | McFly | "Motion in the Ocean" | "Transylvania" | | Producer | UK #1 |
| 2006 | McFly | "Motion in the Ocean" | "Lonely" | | Producer | |
| 2006 | McFly | "Motion in the Ocean" | "Little Joanna" | | Producer | |
| 2006 | McFly | "Motion in the Ocean" | "Friday Night" | Jason Perry, Daniel P. Carter, Tom Fletcher, Daniel Jones | Producer | |
| 2006 | McFly | "Motion in the Ocean" | "Walk in the Sun" | Jason Perry, Daniel P. Carter, Tom Fletcher, Daniel Jones | Producer | |
| 2006 | McFly | "Motion in the Ocean" | "Home Is Where The Heart Is" | | Producer | |
