= She Gets Out the Scrapbook: The Best of Furniture =

Compilation album by Furniture
- Released: September 1991
- Length: 56:33
- Label: Survival Records
- Producer: Furniture (tracks 3, 7, 9–10, 12); Mick Glossop (tracks 1–2, 6, 14); Mike Thorne (tracks 4, 8, 13); Tim Parry (track 5); Sid Wells (track 11)

Furniture chronology
Food, Sex & Paranoia (1990)	She Gets Out the Scrapbook: The Best of Furniture (1991)

She Gets Out the Scrapbook: The Best of Furniture is a compilation album by the new wave band Furniture, released in 1991. The LP version features twelve tracks and the CD version fourteen with the addition of "Robert Nightman's Story" and "Bullet". The compilation features two new studio tracks: "Farewell" and "How I've Come to Hate the Moon".

To promote the album, "Brilliant Mind" was given a re-issue by Survival Records on 7" and 12" vinyl. It featured the exclusive B-side "On a Bus with Peter Nero".

== Critical reception ==
Professional ratings
Review scores
Source	Rating
AllMusic	4.5/5 stars
NME	8/10
Newcastle Evening Chronicle	favourable
Select	3/5 stars
The Virgin Encyclopedia of Eighties Music	3/4 stars

On its release, Chris Roberts of Melody Maker considered Furniture to have left "an eloquent and admirable legacy" and noted that, in addition to their run of bad luck with "labels folding [and] legal wrangles", their "versatility and ambition cost them dear [and] made them hard to sell". He concluded, "Only a fool could ignore these songs; perhaps only a lovesick fool could fully appreciate them. She Gets Out the Scrapbook is about as magnificent a monument as the average Michelangelo." Simon Williams of NME described it as a collection of "14-odd (in both senses of the word) anthems for bedsit-bound romantics and musical masochists" and added, "Alongside the traditional gizmos of pop, you'll find tongue drums, synclaviers and something called a Yans Ci'in, all of which are deployed as weaponry in the kind of emotional warfare that makes Furniture's love lives appear as battle-scarred as miniature Vietnams." He noted "several bona fide reasons for buying this album in your millions and forcing Furniture to reform forthwith" including "Brilliant Mind", "Make Believe I'm Him", "She Gets Out the Scrapbook" and "Slow Motion Kisses".

Gordon Barr of Newcastle Evening Chronicle commented, "This "best of" album is the definitive collection of Furniture tracks. Hits may not be the right word as the only real one they had was 'Brilliant Mind'. But one listen to this shows how unfair the pop world can be - there should have been more hits!" Nick Duerden of Select wrote, "A lament-laden compilation from a mid-'80s band who were never rewarded with the recognition they so obviously deserved. Records like the poetic hit single 'Brilliant Mind' never date. They just improve with age." Peter Buckley, in his 2003 book The Rough Guide to Rock, described the compilation as "a posthumous summary of much-neglected talents". AllMusic recommended the album by picking it as an AMG Album Pick.

== Track listing ==
No.	Title	Writer(s)	Length
1.	"Brilliant Mind"	Jim Irvin, Tim Whelan, Hamilton Lee, Sally Still	3:40
2.	"Make Believe I'm Him"	Whelan, Irvin	3:35
3.	"Farewell"	Irvin, Whelan, Still, Lee	3:40
4.	"Song for a Doberman"	Whelan	2:32
5.	"Dancing the Hard Bargain"	Whelan, Irvin, Lee	2:41
6.	"Love Your Shoes"	Whelan, Irvin, Lee	3:27
7.	"Robert Nightman's Story"	Whelan, Irvin, Lee	3:52
8.	"Slow Motion Kisses"	Whelan, Irvin	3:47
9.	"I Miss You"	Whelan, Irvin, Lee	4:33
10.	"How I've Come to Hate the Moon"	Still, Irvin, Lee	4:24
11.	"Bullet"	Whelan, Irvin, Lee	5:09
12.	"Turnupspeed"	Whelan, Irvin, Lee, Still	4:58
13.	"One Step Behind You"	Whelan	4:15
14.	"She Gets Out The Scrapbook"	Whelan, Irvin	6:00

== Personnel ==
Furniture

- Jim Irvin - vocals
- Tim Whelan - guitar, vocals
- Maya Gilder - keyboards
- Sally Still - bass
- Hamilton Lee - drums

Production

- Furniture (tracks 3, 7, 9–10, 12)
- Mick Glossop (tracks 1–2, 6, 14)
- Mike Thorne (tracks 4, 8, 13)
- Tim Parry (track 5)
- Sid Wells (track 11)

Other

- Ryan Art - sleeve
- Becky Jones - cover illustration
- Steve Double - photography
