= Slow Motion Kisses =

1989 song by Furniture

Single by Furniture

from the album Food, Sex & Paranoia
- B-side: "40 Hours in a Day"
- Released: 2 October 1989
- Length: 3:44
- Label: Arista
- Songwriter(s): Tim Whelan; Jim Irvin
- Producer(s): Mike Thorne

Furniture singles chronology
"Love Your Shoes" (1986)	"Slow Motion Kisses" (1989)	"One Step Behind You" (1990)

"Slow Motion Kisses" is a song by British new wave band Furniture, released in 1989 as the lead single from their third and final studio album, Food, Sex & Paranoia (1990). The song was written by Tim Whelan and Jim Irvin, and was produced by Mike Thorne.

== Background ==
"Slow Motion Kisses" was written by band members Tim Whelan and Jim Irvin around 1984, and was, according to drummer Hamilton Lee, their "blatant attempt to write a song for someone else". It was left unrecorded until the band signed to Arista Records in 1989 and recorded their third album, Food, Sex & Paranoia.

== Release ==
"Slow Motion Kisses" was Furniture's debut release for Arista Records and their first release in three years due to legal problems surrounding their contract with Stiff Records. After Stiff was sold to ZTT Records in 1987, the band became locked in litigation as they tried to free themselves from their contract. This left the band unable to record new material, so they spent time touring countries in Eastern Europe and the Middle East, and were eventually free to sign a new contract with Arista in 1989.

The 7-inch and 12-inch formats of "Slow Motion Kisses" were released on 2 October 1989, followed by the CD format on 9 October 1989. To promote its release, band members Jim Irvin and Sally Still made an appearance on BBC Two's Juke Box Jury as the show's "mystery guests". The jury all gave the song a thumbs up, thereby predicting it would be a hit. The song failed to reach the top 100 of the UK Singles Chart, but did peak at number 16 on Music Week's 'The Other Chart'.

== Music video ==
The song's music video, which did not feature the band but two actors, was directed by Martha Fiennes. It was Fiennes' first project after finishing film school and she recalled in an interview with Artnet Gallery Network in 2020, "It had a tiny budget; something like £700 – a joke – so I shot it in a friend's house. It was totally cheap-looking but I'm proud of that little video. I remember thinking, I know I can do this."

== Critical reception ==
Upon its release as a single, Stephen Lamacq of NME wrote, "Having stuck by them since the undeniably fine 'Brilliant Mind' I'm a little disturbed to find them back from various contractual problems with this – a severely angst-ridden slowie that sees them trying too hard. They will make another classic record yet, but this isn't it. It's only OK, though compared to Roxette it is £30 million in gold bars on your front doorstep." Lynn Swindlehurst of the Rossendale Free Press stated, "This is quite atmospheric and moody, but not good enough for a top 40 position. A slow rock/pop track, similar to early Simple Minds. Good, clear vocals are a plus point." Neil Finnie, reviewing the 12-inch version of the single for the University of Edinburgh's The Student, was negative in his review, calling "Slow Motion Kisses" "a turgid, plodding excursion, losing itself in its self-indulgence with all the atmosphere of a steaming turd" and adding, "Whatever happened to the drama of 'She Gets Out the Scrapbook'?" He was more positive about the "wonderful" extended version of "Brilliant Mind" as a B-side, which he felt "elevates it to the kind of epic presentation we might expect at a Simple Minds concert".

== Track listing ==
7-inch single (UK)

1. "Slow Motion Kisses" – 3:44
2. "40 Hours in a Day" – 5:01

12-inch single (UK)

1. "Slow Motion Kisses" – 3:44
2. "40 Hours in a Day" – 5:01
3. "Brilliant Mind" – 7:01

CD single (UK)

1. "Slow Motion Kisses" – 3:44
2. "Brilliant Mind" – 3:43
3. "40 Hours in a Day" – 5:01
4. "She Gets Out the Scrapbook" – 5:59

== Personnel ==
Furniture

- Jim Irvin – vocals
- Tim Whelan – guitar, piano, synclavier
- Maya Gilder – keyboards
- Sally Still – bass
- Hamilton Lee – drums, tongue drum, percussion

Production

- Mike Thorne – production ("Slow Motion Kisses")
- Carl Beatty – recording, mixing ("Slow Motion Kisses")
- Stuart Stawman – recording assistance ("Slow Motion Kisses")
- Valerie Ghent – recording assistance ("Slow Motion Kisses")
- Jason Appleton – recording assistance ("Slow Motion Kisses")
- Furniture – production ("40 Hours in a Day")
- Mick Glossop – production ("Brilliant Mind", "She Gets Out the Scrapbook")

Other

- Magali Fowler – artwork
- Michael Steele – photography
- Ryan Art – design

== Charts ==
Chart (1989)	Peak position
UK The Other Chart (Music Week)	16
