= Jemma Freeman =

English multi-instrumentalist musician

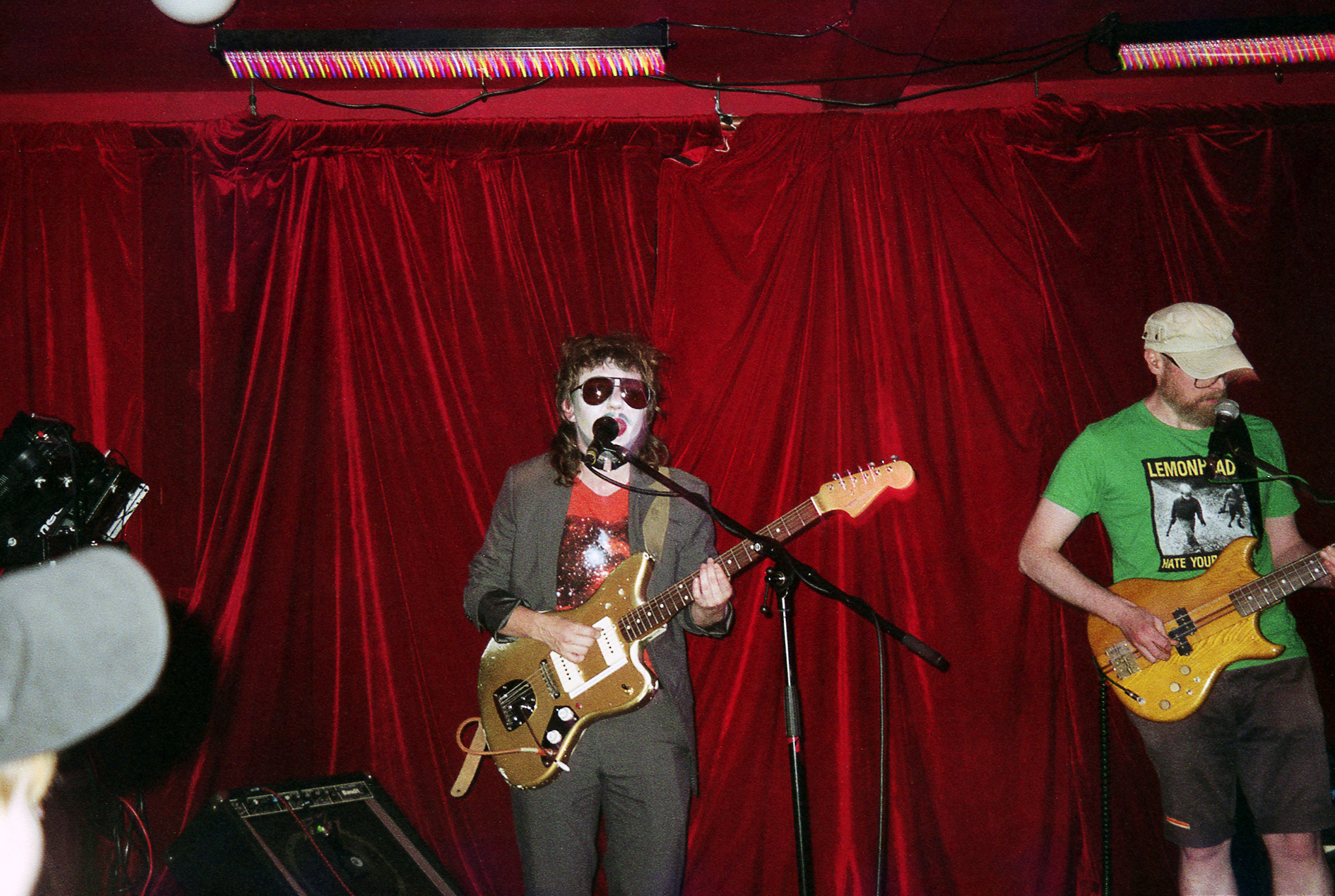
- Jemma Freeman and the Cosmic Something at Paper Dress in London in 2019

Background information
- Origin: United Kingdom
- Genres: Alternative rock, psychedelic rock, indie folk, art-punk
- Occupation: Musician
- Instruments: Guitar, bass guitar, vocals
- Years active: 2003 – present
- Member of: Jemma Freeman and the Cosmic Something, Your Heterosexual Violence
- Formerly of: The Fucks, Landshapes, Gutts
- Website: jemmafreemanandthecosmicsomething.bandcamp.com

Jemma Freeman is an English singer-songwriter and guitarist based in London, UK, active since the early 2000s. They are known principally for solo project Jemma Freeman and the Cosmic Something, which has released two albums and received media coverage on sites including Loud and Quiet, Louder Than War and God Is in the TV.

== Career ==
=== Early years ===
After performing and releasing an EP with the Fucks in the early 2000s, Freeman joined Lulu and the Lampshades, who released their first single, “Feet To The Sky”, in 2009. Following a name change to Landshapes the band produced several albums for Bella Union from 2013.

=== Jemma Freeman and the Cosmic Something ===
In 2017 Freeman launched solo project Jemma Freeman and the Cosmic Something, with a well-received debut EP Someone Else To Blame. Debut album Oh Really What’s That Then followed in 2019, with producer Mark Estall on bass and Hamilton Lee (ex-Furniture, Transglobal Underground) on drums.

Freeman alongside sometime live drummer Jason Ribeiro and new bassist Samuel Nicholson formed a second line-up of the Cosmic Something for a second critically-acclaimed album, Miffed, in 2022, with reviews including Louder Than War and Loud and Quiet.

A third line-up of the band came together in 2024-2025 with Heidi Heelz replacing Nicholson on bass.

Freeman has also performed with other artists including Your Heterosexual Violence, Gutts, Solus3, and Lost Horizons.

== Personal life ==
Freeman is non-binary and queer.

== Selected discography ==
=== Jemma Freeman and the Cosmic Something ===
==== Singles/EPs ====
- “Someone Else To Blame” (Friction Shifter, 2017)
- “Heaven On A Plate”/”Whole Wide World” (2018)
- “Find A Place”/”Small Town Boy” (Trapped Animal, 2019)
- “Alien”/”Hoping For A Miracle” (2024)

==== Albums ====
- Oh Really, What’s That Then? (Trapped Animal, 2019)
- Miffed (Trapped Animal, 2022)

=== The Fucks ===
- EP One (Angular, 2004)
- Art Party (self-released, 2014)

=== Landshapes ===
see Landshapes
