= Food, Sex & Paranoia =

1990 studio album by Furniture

Studio album by Furniture
- Released: February 1990
- Length: 44:52
- Label: Arista
- Producer: Mike Thorne

Furniture chronology
The Wrong People (1986)	Food, Sex & Paranoia (1990)	She Gets Out the Scrapbook: The Best of Furniture (1991)

Food, Sex & Paranoia is the third studio album from the British new wave band Furniture, released in 1990. It was produced by Mike Thorne and would be the band's last studio album before their split in 1991.

== Background ==
After signing to Stiff in 1986, Furniture achieved their commercial breakthrough with the single "Brilliant Mind", which reached No. 21 in the UK. However, both the follow-up single "Love Your Shoes" and the parent album The Wrong People failed to continue this success due to Stiff's financial difficulties. The label went into liquidation and was subsequently sold to ZTT, leaving the band to spend the next two years freeing themselves from their contract.

Meanwhile, the band were able to spend time touring with the British Council in countries such as Cyprus, Turkey, Romania and Czechoslovakia. In 1989, having cleared the legal issues with their ZZT contract, the band signed to Arista. They recorded Food, Sex & Paranoia at Wessex Sound Studios and the Stereo Society. Preceding the album was the single "Slow Motion Kisses", which was released in October, but failed to chart. A second single, "One Step Behind You", suffered a similar fate upon release in February 1990. The album was released that same month, but was not a commercial success and saw limited promotion from Arista. By the time of its release, the label had undergone a major reshuffling of their A&R department, which had resulted in the sacking of the team who had signed Furniture to the label. Food, Sex & Paranoia sold approximately 5,000 copies.

The band embarked on a 33-date UK tour during February–March to promote the album. After the album's commercial failure, the band were dropped from Arista and returned to their former label Survival. They continued to tour during 1990–91, though keyboardist Maya Gilder left the band in 1990. They performed at the Reading Festival in 1990 and released the compilation She Gets Out The Scrapbook: The Best of Furniture in 1991. A new album was planned, however the closure of Survival Studios ultimately led the band to split that same year. "One Step Behind You" was covered in 1992 by German singer Marian Gold (of Alphaville fame) for his album So Long Celeste.

== Release ==
Food, Sex & Paranoia was originally scheduled for release by Arista on 6 November 1989, but its release was then delayed until February 1990.

== Critical reception ==
Professional ratings
Review scores
Source	Rating
Los Angeles Times	3/5 stars
New Musical Express	8/10

Upon release, High Fidelity News and Record Review said, "Bleak Stuff, the kind usually inspired by reading too many street fashion magazines or believing all the nonsense written about The Velvets. The title hits two out of three but destroys the equation; maybe this mob should watch Tom Jones instead of The Cook, The Thief, His Wife etc." Robin Denselow of The Guardian described the album as "a set of varied, oddball emotional mood songs". He added, "There are thoughtful, gently-pounding dramatic ballads matched with rumbling keyboards or swirling Arabic and Eastern effects, along with muted galloping rockers with low-key vocals. They are not an obvious commercial success, but deserve to survive because of their original material."

Mick Mercer of Melody Maker concluded, "What a record – never knowing from one minute to the next whether you'll be knocked out, or seduced!" He added, "Nobody else does what Furniture do. Oh, granted, Deacon Blue do an idiot's version, but they never get close." Simon Williams of New Musical Express wrote, "Furniture are immensely gifted storytellers, working on the premise that from small aches, monstrous agonies grow. They always fall for the unorthodox elements: the shimmering, economic guitars, low profile yet hard hitting rhythms, even the mysticism of the Far East. Food, Sex and Paranoia is an exquisite oddity." In the US, Steve Hochman of Los Angeles Times commented, "Rather than politics, Furniture's obsessions are all romantic – actually, about the emotionally fatal, all-consuming side of romance. But the co-ed quintet's music is at times as haunting as McCarthy's, sometimes reminiscent of Prefab Sprout or Deacon Blue, though often more textually inventive and dynamic." In his book The Virgin Encyclopedia of Eighties Music, Colin Larkin described the album as "overlooked" and one that "should have resurrected their career".

== Track listing ==
No.	Title	Writer(s)	Length
1.	"One Step Behind You"	Tim Whelan	4:27
2.	"Slow Motion Kisses"	Whelan, Jim Irvin	3:46
3.	"Swing Tender"	Whelan, Irvin, Hamilton Lee	4:20
4.	"A Taste of You"	Whelan, Irvin	3:54
5.	"A Plot to Kill What Was"	Whelan, Irvin	4:40
6.	"On a Slow Fuse"	Whelan, Irvin	3:47
7.	"Subway to the Beach"	Whelan, Irvin	3:37
8.	"Song for a Doberman"	Whelan	2:33
9.	"Love Me"	Whelan	4:58
10.	"Friend of a Friend" (Extended Version)	Whelan, Irvin, Lee, Sally Still, Maya Gilder	6:02
11.	"Hard to Say"	Whelan, Irvin	2:41

== Personnel ==
Furniture

- Jim Irvin - vocals
- Tim Whelan - guitar
- Maya Gilder - keyboards
- Sally Still - bass, lead vocals (track 8)
- Hamilton Lee - drums

Additional personnel

- Audrey Riley, Mick Stirling, Tamsy Kaner - cello (tracks 3, 9)
- Aubrey Bryan - steel pans (tracks 6, 11)
- Johnny Folarin - congas (track 10)
- Mike Thorne - producer
- Carl Beatty - mixing, recording
- Jack Skinner - mastering
- Jason Appleton, Valerie Ghent, Stuart Stawman - recording assistance
- Ryan Art - design
- Phil Coulson - group photography
