= Love Your Shoes =

Single by Furniture

from the album The Wrong People
- B-side: "Turnupspeed"
- Released: December 1984; 6 October 1986
- Length: 3:37 (1984); 3:25 (1986)
- Label: Premonition Records (1984); Stiff (1986)
- Songwriters: Tim Whelan; Jim Irvin; Hamilton Lee
- Producers: Furniture (1984); Mick Glossop (1986)

Furniture singles chronology
| "Brilliant Mind" (1986) | "Love Your Shoes" (1984) | "Slow Motion Kisses" (1989) |

"Love Your Shoes" is a song from British new wave band Furniture, released in December 1984 as a non-album single on Premonition Records. The band re-recorded the song for their 1986 studio album The Wrong People, from which it was the second single, released on 6 October 1986. The song was written by Tim Whelan, Jim Irvin and Hamilton Lee.

== Background ==
Speaking of the song's meaning to Record Mirror in 1986, guitarist Tim Whelan commented, "The statement 'Love Your Shoes' is the kind of smarmy comment you hear people making at parties. It's the kind of statement people make as you're sipping your beer." Lead singer Jim Irvin later said that the song was "about being crap at chatting someone up".

== Release ==
The 1984 release of "Love Your Shoes" impressed Stiff and led them to sign the band in 1986. Their debut release on the label, "Brilliant Mind", broke the band commercially, reaching number 21 in the UK Singles Chart in July of that year. The follow-up single was a re-recorded version of "Love Your Shoes", which was expected to provide the band with a second hit.

"Love Your Shoes" generated strong airplay on UK radio, but internal issues at Stiff, including distribution problems, led the single to miss the top 100 of the UK Singles Chart and stall at number 101. In the time leading up to the single's release, Stiff declared bankruptcy and went into receivership before being bought by Jill Sinclair of ZTT. Irvin recalled in 2010, "The week before release it was very high in the airplay charts, beating the current Madonna single. People said it was a potential Number 1. Then Stiff cocked up the distribution."

== Music video ==
The music video for the 1986 version was directed by Nicholas Brandt. In 2010, Irvin recollected the "stressful, 16 hour video shoot" and felt the concept behind the video took the song "way too literal and just made me look pervy". The house selected for filming the video was vacant at the time as its owner had recently died.

== Critical reception ==
In a review of the 1984 recording, Jerry Smith of Music Week wrote, "A rich, seductive vocal over a shuffling beat, moody echoing guitar and organ creates a well executed indie single that combines melody with passion."

Reviewing the 1986 release, Jack Barron of Sounds stated that "you need 'Love Your Shoes' in order to be able to dance to the purest form of pop that still has intelligent life". Nancy Culp of Record Mirror wrote, "How can I resist such a dreamy record? Destined for blanket play on Janice Long." Paul Massey of the Evening Express stated, "Almost too similar to 'Brilliant Mind', but Jim Irvin's vocals and racy chorus pull it through." Cath Carroll of the NME commented, "There's enough of 'Pleasant Valley Sunday' in this to warrant several re-plays, but I still can't work out whether I'm charmed or irritated by the singer's out-of-breath cool. Maybe some of the sentiments are a little too self-conscious for comfort."

In a review of the 1991 compilation She Gets Out the Scrapbook: The Best of Furniture, Chris Roberts of Melody Maker noted the song "show[s] off an astonishing fusion of pop and bitterness, joie de vivre and pessimism".

== Formats ==
12" single (Premonition Records, UK, 1984)
| No. | Title | Note | Length |
|---|---|---|---|
| 1. | "Love Your Shoes" | | 3:37 |
| 2. | "Escape Into My Arms" | | 4:27 |
| 3. | "Throw Away the Script" | Instrumental Mix | 5:21 |

12" single (Survival Records, Japan, 1984)
| No. | Title | Length |
|---|---|---|
| 1. | "Love Your Shoes" | 3:37 |
| 2. | "Dancing the Hard Bargain" | 3:58 |

7" single (Stiff Records, UK, 1986)
| No. | Title | Length |
|---|---|---|
| 1. | "Love Your Shoes" | 3:25 |
| 2. | "Turnupspeed" | 5:02 |

12" single (Stiff Records, UK, 1986)
| No. | Title | Note | Length |
|---|---|---|---|
| 1. | "Love Your Shoes" | Expanded Mix | 5:11 |
| 2. | "Love Your Shoes" | | 3:25 |
| 3. | "Turnupspeed" | | 5:02 |
| 4. | "Me and You and the Name" | | 3:15 |

== Personnel ==
Furniture

- Jim Irvin – vocals
- Tim Whelan – guitar
- Maya Gilder – keyboards
- Sally Still – bass
- Hamilton Lee – drums

1984 production

- Richard Preston – engineer on "Love Your Shoes" and "Throw Away the Script" (Instrumental Mix)
- John Fishlock, Gavin Greenaway – remixing on "Love Your Shoes"
- Furniture – producers of "Love Your Shoes" and "Escape into my Arms"

1986 production

- Mick Glossop – producer of "Love Your Shoes" and "Me and You and the Name"
- Furniture – producer of "Turnupspeed"
- Boz Boorer – clarinet on "Turnupspeed"
- Calum Colvin – cover picture

== Charts ==
| Chart (1986) | Peak position |
|---|---|
| UK Singles Chart | 101 |
| UK Music Week Top Indie Singles | 39 |
