= The Wrong People =

The Wrong People may refer to:

- The Wrong People (novel), a 1967 gay thriller novel by Robin Maugham
- The Wrong People (album), a 1986 album by British new wave band Furniture
