= The Transmitters =

British art rock post-punk band

- Origin: Ealing, London, England
- Genres: Post-punk, jazz fusion, art punk, psychedelic rock
- Years active: 1977–1988; 2007–present?
- Labels: Ebony (1978–1979); Step-Forward (1979–1980); Heartbeat (1981–1988); 9CC/Craving Co (1989); You Are Not Stealing (2006); Elsewhere (2007–present)
- Members: Dave Baby; Rob Chapman; Jim Chase; Vince Cutcliffe; Amanda de Grey; Sam Dodson; John Guillani; Hamilton Lee; Mikel Lee; Christopher McHallem; James McQueen; Dave Muddyman; Mark Perry; John Quinn; Bob Sargeant; Joe Sax; Julian Treasure; Steve Walsh; Simon "Sid" Wells; Tim Whelan; John Woodley
- Website: elsewhen.org.uk/transmitters.html

The Transmitters were a British art rock/post-punk band active during the late 1970s and throughout the 1980s. Mixing elements of punk, jazz and psychedelia, the band were critical favourites throughout their lifetime and played support slots for a wide variety of underground and mainstream bands, although this did not translate into substantial commercial success.

The Transmitters are also notable for featuring future members of Loop Guru and Transglobal Underground and for sharing two members with cult pop band Furniture, as well as a guest stint by Glaxo Babies vocalist Rob Chapman. Their sound was compared to (among others) The Fall, XTC, Gang of Four, This Heat and Magazine.

(This band should not be confused with the other British indie band called The Transmitters, who are a more conventional indie rock band with an entirely different line-up, and were formed in 2006.)

== History ==
=== 1970s Transmitters ===
==== Formation and early releases ====
The band formed in Ealing, West London in 1977. The original line-up was John Quinn (vocals – also known as "John Clegg", "John Grimes" or "John X"), Sam Dodson (guitar, aka "Sam Dodds"), Simon "Sid" Wells (bass), Amanda de Grey (keyboards), Jim Chase (drums) and Dexter O'Brian (lyrics – real name Christopher McHallem). Guitarists Steve Walsh (Manicured Noise) and John Guillani (from O'Brian's other band The Decorators) also stood in as live members at various times. Rick Kemp was initially on drums.

The band's debut single was "Party", released on Ebony Records in 1978. This was followed in the same year by the album 24 Hours.

On 29 December 1978, the band played a concert at the Electric Ballroom, Camden, supporting The Police. On 15 February 1979, they supported an early line-up of The Human League at the Nashville Rooms, West London. (Other bands played with during this period include Scritti Politti, The Birthday Party, Dolly Mixture, The Slits, Alternative TV, The Fall and Blurt.)

A concert at the Greenwich Theatre on 18 March 1979 was reviewed by both NME and Record Mirror Review. Writing in the latter, Chris Westwood said "The Transmitters were, as is their forte, unpredictable, uncalculatedly comic, inspiring and brilliant... The sound is open, free, off-the-cuff, bound together through all the stumbling, fumbling chaos that their approach entails. "The One That Won The War", par example, a personal favourite, damn near falls apart at the seams, with clattering whining guitar thrashes mating with probably the most essential bass phrase this side of any other Transmitters number you care to name." NME's Paul Morley described the music as "feverish and jumpy" and stated "The Transmitters are the cheekiest group I've seen since The Mekons; the wackiest I've seen since Public Image (and almost as sinister). They were, of course, great. Naturally, their music is of Velvets' ancestry; deceptively nonchalant, barely controlled, repetitive, erratic and intoxicating, presented with an odd, wry condescension."

The same reviews paid plenty of attention to the band's stage presence, in particular that of the charismatic John Quinn. Describing Quinn as "inscrutable", Morley also claimed that he had "the comedy timing of a Dave Allen, the detachment of a Devoto, the amused poise of a Mark Smith, the cool of a Sinatra." Meanwhile, Westwood was entertained by the group's ramshackle presentation – "A serious set? That may have been the intent, but one look at John, the vocalist, and a crowd can crack up. He stumbles around, fag in mitt, flanked by a drunken bass player (Simon Wells), a drunken guitarist (Sam Dodson), a workmanlike drummer (Jim Chase), and the strangely sombre on-stage persona of keyboardist, Amanda De Grey."

During 1979, Dodson (along with de Grey and Wells) sometimes performed in The Good Missionaries – the art rock band led by Mark Perry, which had evolved out of Perry's previous band Alternative TV. Perry occasionally returned the favour by playing with The Transmitters.

==== First Peel Session, further releases and initial split ====
Gaining the attention and approval of DJ John Peel, the band recorded a Peel Session in 1979, following which Dexter O'Brian left the band. (Under his real name of Christopher McHallem, he would retrain as an actor and spend three years in the BBC soap opera "EastEnders", playing the character "Rod Norman" between 1987 and 1990, before branching out into screenwriting.)

In September 1979, The Transmitters released two singles within the same month. The first was their last release on Ebony Records, "Nowhere Train", of which Lenny Kaye (in Melody Maker) commented "The Transmitters, in an eerie, dronal tune, call up the ghosts of serpent power, a neat bit of seance, just following tracks…”

The second of the September singles was the four track EP "Still Hunting for the Ugly Man" (on new label Step-Forward Records) which reached Number 2 in the Our Price New Wave Charts. In NME, Paul Morley described it as "an obsessive, frustrated record. Consistently effective and annoying, it rummages restlessly out on lunatic fringes. It's difficult, discomforting and oppressively manic, but worth exploring." Morley also drew comparisons to The Fall, noting that "both groups are cynics and critics. Both groups are fronted by hurried, mocking inciters. Both groups deal with instabilities, abnormalities, ambitious truths... and make demented shell-shocked music."

The Transmitters played a pro-National Abortion Campaign benefit gig at the Hope & Anchor, Islington, London on 28 October 1979. Reviewing the concert in Sounds, Nick Tester reflected "The Transmitters were a useful choice for a movement (all about choice) fighting a pitiful and regressive male intrusion. They borrow from a wide source – early psychedelia, Beefheart, through to even Essential Logic – but furrow the influences into a style which demands to be taken on its own merits. Comparisons are so limited that I find it hard to avoid the much mistaken and inflexible term 'progressive'. Further to this, their music, whether cautious or dissipated, is always underlined by a devilishly impulsive awareness and wicked streak of unpredictability. They play a serious game of musical hide and seek... In a set that switched with as much consistency as a knackered fluorescent light the Transmitters were always compelling and somehow evaded a possible self-destructive urge."

The Transmitters broke up in 1980.

=== Transmitters Presumed Dead ===
Soon after the split a new Ealing-based band emerged, called Transmitters Presumed Dead. As the name implied this was a merger between members of Transmitters (Dodson, Wells and Chase) and members of the similarly defunct band Missing Presumed Dead (Mikel Lee and Dave Baby). Tim Whelan (one of the two singers of Furniture) was recruited to sing lead vocals.

Chris Westwood reviewed the new band's concert at the Trafalgar, Shepherds Bush in Record Mirror, concluding "the actual point of TPD lies not in their affected clumsiness but in transforming clever and demanding music into a touching, entertaining sort of hobby.”

=== 1980s Transmitters ===
==== Launch of second line-up and second album ====
Transmitters Presumed Dead soon transformed into the second Transmitters line-up of Sam Dodson (guitar), Sid Wells (bass), Dave Baby (saxophone) and Julian Treasure (drums, ex Fish Turned Human) with Mikel Lee leaving and Rob Chapman (lead vocals, ex Glaxo Babies) replacing Tim Whelan. This band recorded a second Peel Session in 1981, as well as releasing the second Transmitters album – And We Call That Leisure Time – on Bristols' Heartbeat Records later in the year.

(In parallel, Mikel Lee (guitar, vocals), Julian Treasure (drums), Tim Whelan (guitar, vocals) and Ian Hawkridge (bass) came together as a reinvented Missing Presumed Dead, gigging and recording their own John Peel Session in the same year which was produced by Bob Sargent and included a strong version of the original Transmitters song "0.5 Alive".)

==== Transmitters in transit (1982–1987) ====
The line-up of The Transmitters continued to change over the years. Baby, Wells and Treasure all left at various points during the 1980s; Treasure was replaced by the returning Jim Chase, and Whelan also returned to the line-up (replacing Chapman). Several more musicians passed through The Transmitters during this period – including guitarist Vince Cutcliffe and keyboard player Bob Sargeant (aka "the Hand of Borgus Wheems"). Live performances were augmented by several other "floating" members – Joe Sax and theremin player John Woodley.

In 1985, a Transmitters song called "Sheep Farming" became the first song to be remixed by a new worldbeat outfit called Loop Guru (which happened to be led by head Transmitter Sam Dodson).

==== Final line-up and recordings ====
The band's final line-up (between 1987 and 1989) was Dodson, Whelan, Chase, James McQueen (bass), Dave "Mud-Demon" Muddyman (keyboards/accordion/sampler, ex-Birdloom) and Whelan's Furniture colleague Hamilton "Hami" Lee (drums, sampler). This line-up recorded tracks for a third Transmitters album which was not released during the band's lifetime. This music finally saw the light of day as Count Your Blessings (1987/89), which was released as a free download album in 2006 by Portuguese digital record label You Are Not Stealing Records.

Reviewing a gig at Subterrania, London in 1988, Melody Maker's Chris Roberts claimed "Tim Whelan is the most restless man alive and demonstrates this by dancing like a young Jackson, pacing like Mark E Smith, and hurling himself at the floor like any-age Iggy. He spits forth his topical angst ("there's a hole in the world") while his lanky henchmen beat manifold drums, extract Haitian war chants from keyboard thingies, and scratch shrill guitars like jaguars assaulting sandpaper. They tangle with the Velvets' "Ferryboat Bill" quite swimmingly and, all things assimilated, are a cathartic anglepoise on the heart of darkness. Highly wrecked and mended."

The Transmitters released a 12-inch single, "The Mechanic", on yet another label (9CC/Craving Co Productions) in 1989. Writing in Music Week, Dave Henderson described it as "like Stump never happened, wanton artiness, expressing-yourself tendencies and other such angles are exposed.”

The band split up for the second time later in 1989.

=== Post-split ===
==== Tim Whelan and Hamilton Lee (Transglobal Underground) ====
Whelan and Lee continued to write and play with their other band, Furniture, until 1990. They launched their own worldbeat project Transglobal Underground two years later in 1992.

==== Sam Dodson and Dave Muddyman (Loop Guru etc) ====
Dodson and Muddyman (under the pseudonyms of "Salman Gita" and "Jamuud") continued with their worldbeat project Loop Guru), launching the project in full in 1992.

Dodson also teamed up with Loop Guru singer Linda Finger, Damned's drummer Rat Scabies, Psychic TV's Jim Daly (aka "Jym Darling") and jazz singer Liz Fletcher to form Slipper, an electronica-and-vocal project with elements of gospel and jazz. Described as "Portishead with a sense of humour" the project released two albums (2000s Invisible Movies and 2002's Zoon Sandwich, both on Rephlex Records) and a mini-album called Earworms (released on the Mechanism label in 2002). Another Transmitters player, theremin player John Woodley, was a frequent contributor.

Dodson and Daly also teamed up as Thaw, another electronica project blending urban trance techno with ancient vocal chants and "tribal rhythms". Thaw released the Holy Cat album on Dodson's record label Elsewhen in 2005.

Most recently, Dodson has teamed up with Neil Sparkes (ex-Transglobal Underground and a current Temple of Sound member) to form Loungeclash, whose debut album Dread Time Story was released on Warlock Records/Sony Red USA on 19 February 2008.

In addition to his Loop Guru membership, Dave Muddyman is currently a member of Hoopy Froods, Round Way Wrong and MuudMap.

==== Various members (The Flavel Bambi Septet) ====
Circa 1991, Whelan and Lee reunited with Julian Treasure, Jim Chase and James McQueen in The Flavel Bambi Septet, a light-hearted Ealing-based world music band named after a gas cooker and perform Arabic and Middle Eastern pop music standards, oriental classics, Russian polkas, Nigerian brass band favourites and Klezmer tunes. During its existence, the band made regular performances at Club Dog and Waterman's Art Centre (in West London) and also made an appearance at the Edinburgh Festival Fringe as the house band for a variety theatre show.

=== 2007 reunion ===
The Transmitters reunited in March 2007 to promote the compilation album I Fear No One, which included the recordings from their first Peel session in 1979. This album was released on 12 March 2007 on the Dodson-owned record label Elsewhen Records.

The band performed a reunion gig at The Inn on the Green, Ladbroke Grove, West London on 40 March 2007. The band line-up on this occasion was similar to the final 1980s line-up, consisting of Sam Dodson (guitar), Tim Whelan (vocals), James McQueen (bass), John Woodley (theremin and keyboards), Jim Chase (drums) and Hamilton Lee (drums and sampler).

== Discography ==
=== Singles and EPs ===
- "Party" (Ebony, 1978)
- "Nowhere Train" (Ebony, 1979)
- "Still Hunting for the Ugly Man" (1979, Step-Forward Records)
- "The Mechanic" (1989, 9CC/Craving Co Productions)

=== Albums ===
- 24 Hours (1978, Ebony Records)
- And We Call That Leisure Time (1981, Heartbeat, UK, LP, HB4)
- Count Your Blessings (1987/89) (2006, You Are Not Stealing Records – download-only album containing material originally recorded between 1987 and 1989).
- And We Call That Leisure Time [Reissue + 4 Bonus Tracks] (2007, Birdsong, Japan, CD, BIRD-2008)

=== Compilation albums ===
- I Fear No-One… (Elsewhere Records, 2007)
