= Something to Look Forward To =

Something to Look Forward To may refer to:

- "Something to Look Forward To", a song by Clearlake from their 2001 album Lido
- "Something to Look Forward To", a song by Spoon from their 2002 album Kill the Moonlight
