= The Wrong People (album) =

Studio album by Furniture
- Released: 10 November 1986
- Genre: New wave; synth-pop
- Length: 41:19; 77:51 (2010 CD re-issue)
- Label: Stiff
- Producer: Mick Glossop

Furniture chronology
The Lovemongers (1986)	The Wrong People (1986)	Food, Sex & Paranoia (1990)

The Wrong People is the second studio album by the British new wave band Furniture, released on 10 November 1986 by Stiff Records.

== Background ==
In 1986, Furniture signed a recording contract with independent label Stiff Records. Their first release on the label was the single "Brilliant Mind", which was released in April and reached number 21 in the UK Singles Chart, giving the band their commercial breakthrough. To capitalise on the success, their former label Survival/Premonition released The Lovemongers in June, a collection of the band's earlier studio recordings. In October, the band released their follow-up single "Love Your Shoes", which was a re-recorded version of a song first released as a single in 1984. Despite becoming a radio hit, the single failed to chart after financial troubles faced by Stiff resulted in the failure to press enough copies of the single to match demand. The Wrong People soon followed in November, and was released on LP and cassette in the UK, France and Belgium. However, the album also suffered from Stiff's financial crisis. 30,000 copies were pressed, but the label then went into liquidation and was subsequently sold to ZTT Records, who opted not to press any more copies. After its release, the album became a cult classic.

The band spent the next two years freeing themselves from the Stiff contract. Meanwhile, they were able to spend time touring with the British Council in countries such as Cyprus, Turkey, Romania and Czechoslovakia. They signed to Arista Records in 1989 and released Food, Sex & Paranoia in 1990, but it was also a commercial failure. Afterwards, the band continued to tour and released the compilation She Gets Out the Scrapbook: The Best of Furniture in 1991, but decided to split soon after. The Wrong People remained out-of-print for many years until 2010, when it was given its first CD and digital download release by Cherry Red Records, containing nine bonus tracks.

== Critical reception ==
Professional ratings
Review scores
Source	Rating
AllMusic	2.5/5 stars
Record Mirror	1.5/5 stars
Smash Hits	8/10 stars
Sounds	4/5 stars

Upon its release, Jack Barron of Sounds praised the "sparkling record" for its "clean-limbed, tormented-mind pop". He noted Furniture were a "technically awesome group" who also "know the value of a very well-turned lyric" and added that Irvin's voice is the "perfect vehicle" for the theme of "hearts being broken" and "relationships fail[ing]" as he is able to "project sorrow, mania and despair". Derrin Schlesinger of Smash Hits said, "Although the lyrics sound a mite gloomy and doomy, the music soon whisks one up into much better spirits. It is a wonderful swirling, whirling potful of different sounds."

In 1991, The Wrong People was included in a feature by NME covering a selection of "great lost albums". Reviewer Simon Williams described it as "chock-full of frisky rhythms, perverted guitar licks and the kind of emotional lyrical openness which terrified passing psychiatrists". He concluded the "intelligent, eccentric and, even better, accurate" album "should have been huge". In a review of the album's 2010 CD re-issue, Stephen Emms of The Guardian said, "This week one of the best albums ever recorded becomes available to download. Furniture's 1986 cult classic, The Wrong People, fused new wave, jazz, blues, post-punk, alt-rock, and about a dozen other genres with some of the most poetic lyrics ever written. Yet for all its literary qualities – its evocation of the mundane, compromise, opportunity and transience of real life – The Wrong People is a theatre of the visceral, a melodrama and gorgeous sax-soaked 1980s pop all at once."

== Track listing ==
No.	Title	Writer(s)	Length
1.	"Shake Like Judy Says"	Tim Whelan; Jim Irvin; Hamilton Lee	4:37
2.	"Love Your Shoes"	Whelan; Irvin; Lee	3:25
3.	"Brilliant Mind"	Whelan; Irvin; Lee; Sally Still	3:43
4.	"She Gets Out the Scrapbook"	Whelan; Irvin	5:57
5.	"I Miss You"	Whelan; Irvin; Lee	4:34
6.	"Make Believe I'm Him"	Whelan; Irvin	3:35
7.	"Let Me Feel Your Pulse"	Whelan; Irvin; Lee; Still	2:45
8.	"The Sound of the Bell"	Whelan; Irvin	3:11
9.	"Escape into My Arms"	Whelan; Irvin; Lee	3:37
10.	"Answer the Door"	Whelan; Irvin; Lee	2:45
11.	"Pierres Fight"	Whelan; Irvin	3:06
Total length:			41:19

Cherry Red CD bonus tracks
No.	Title	Writer(s)	Length
12.	"Brilliant Fragment" (B-Side to "Brilliant Mind")	Whelan; Irvin; Lee; Still	1:17
13.	"That Man You Loved" (Demo)	Irvin; Whelan	2:39
14.	"Never Said" (Demo)	Irvin; Whelan	3:50
15.	"To Gus" (B-Side to "Brilliant Mind")	Whelan; Irvin; Lee	2:45
16.	"Turnupspeed" (B-Side to "Brilliant Mind")	Whelan; Irvin; Lee; Still	5:02
17.	"Me, You and the Name" (B-Side to "Love Your Shoes")	Whelan; Irvin; Lee; Still; Maya Gilder	3:15
18.	"It Continues" (B-Side to "One Step Behind You")	Whelan; Irvin; Lee; Still; Gilder	5:28
19.	"Brilliant Mind" (Extended Version)	Whelan; Irvin; Lee; Still	7:01
20.	"Love Your Shoes" (Extended Version)	Whelan; Irvin; Lee	5:11
Total length:			77:51

== Personnel ==
Furniture

- Jim Irvin – vocals
- Tim Whelan – guitar, vocals
- Maya Gilder – keyboards
- Sally Still – bass
- Hamilton Lee – drums

Additional personnel

- Martin Drover – trumpet (tracks 1, 6), flugelhorn (track 5)
- Larry N'Azone – saxophone (track 3)
- Phil Todd – saxophone (tracks 5, 7, 10)
- Charlie Buchannon, Tim Beaton – strings (track 3)
- Mick Glossop – producer, recorder
- Andy Mason, Dave Grant, Dave Holmes – assistant producers, assistant recorders
- John Brough, Renny Hill, Seb Brough – assistant mixers (track 3)
- Calum Colvin – artwork

== Charts ==
=== Singles ===
"Brilliant Mind"

Chart (1986)	Peak position
UK Singles Chart	21
