= Psychic Karaoke =

Studio album by Transglobal Underground
- Released: 1996
- Genre: Dance pop, electronic music
- Label: Nation; MCA
- Producer: Transglobal Underground

Transglobal Underground chronology
Interplanetary Meltdown (1995)	Psychic Karaoke (1996)	Rejoice Rejoice (1998)

Psychic Karaoke is an album by the English group Transglobal Underground, released in 1996. It was released in the United States the following year, via MCA Records.

The album peaked at No. 62 on the UK Albums Chart. Transglobal Underground promoted the album by participating in the 1996 WOMAD festival.

== Production ==
The album was produced by Transglobal Underground. The group used fewer samples on Psychic Karaoke, while also working on the songs in a live setting before recording them. The group made use of tablas and double tonguing.

== Critical reception ==
Professional ratings
Review scores
Source	Rating
AllMusic	4/5 stars
Chicago Tribune	3/4 stars
The Encyclopedia of Popular Music	3/5 stars
MusicHound Rock: The Essential Album Guide	3.5/5 stars
Muzik	3.5/5 stars
Sunday Times	6/10

The Chicago Tribune wrote that "in this frequently exhilarating brand of danceable exotica, guitar-like ouds glide atop hip-hop loops, tablas underpin sweeping strings and the incantations of Moroccan singer Natacha Atlas send it all spiraling heavenward." The Washington Post thought that the group "may be misusing Indo-Arabic music, but such tracks as 'Chariots' and 'Lexicona' prove that the music can take the transglobal exploitation." The Guardian called the album "unique, gilded dance pop—strange, resonant and utterly enchanting."

AllMusic wrote that "things start to bog down a bit by the end, and as you approach the 78th minute of this generous album, you might be forgiven for checking to make sure you didn't accidentally hit the 'repeat' button on your CD player." Colin Larkin thought that "there were echoes of dub reggae, film scores and even European art rockers such as Can in places." MusicHound Rock: The Essential Album Guide opined that Natacha Atlas's "soaring vocals often carry the disc, as she is probably the one element essential to Transglobal Underground's diverse pastiche of sound."

== Track listing ==
No.	Title	Length
1.	"Chariots"
2.	"Mouth Wedding"
3.	"Bullet Train"
4.	"Lexicona"
5.	"A Tongue of Flame (Unidentified Flying Dubplates Mix)"
6.	"Ancient Dreams of the Sky"
7.	"Good Luck Mr. Gorsky"
8.	"Eyeway Souljah"
9.	"Boss Tabla (Full Length Mix)"
10.	"Scully"
11.	"Psycho Karaoke (Mangasouk Mix)"
12.	"Daughter of the Desert"
