= Duniya (The Intrinsic Passion of Mysterious Joy) =

Studio album by Loop Guru
- Released: December 13, 1994
- Recorded: The Beat Factory, Intimate Studios
- Genre: Dubtronica, ambient
- Length: 68:26
- Label: Nation
- Producer: Count Dubulah, Loop Guru

Loop Guru chronology
Duniya (The Intrinsic Passion of Mysterious Joy) (1994)	The Third Chamber (1994)

Professional ratings
Review scores
Source	Rating
AllMusic	2/5 stars

Duniya (The Intrinsic Passion of Mysterious Joy) is the debut album of Loop Guru, released on December 13, 1994, through Nation Records.

== Track listing ==
No.	Title	Music	Length
1.	"Hymn"	Salmon Gita, Cecil B. De Muud	4:05
2.	"Sussan 11"	Sussan Deyhim, Salmon Gita, Cecil B. De Muud	5:15
3.	"Jungle A"	Cecil B. De Muud	5:04
4.	"Through Cinemas"	Salmon Gita, Cecil B. De Muud	5:56
5.	"Bangdad"	Salmon Gita, Cecil B. De Muud, Zahrema	4:06
6.	"The Fine Line Between Passion and Fear"	Salmon Gita, Cecil B. De Muud	4:19
7.	"Senseless"	Salmon Gita, Cecil B. De Muud	4:40
8.	"Freedom from the Known"	Salmon Gita, Cecil B. De Muud	4:33
9.	"Aphrodite's Shoe"	Salmon Gita, Cecil B. De Muud	4:58
10.	"Under Influence"	Salmon Gita, Cecil B. De Muud	5:32
11.	"Tchengo"	Salmon Gita, Cecil B. De Muud	6:19
12.	"The Third Chamber (Part 4)"	Salmon Gita, Cecil B. De Muud	21:49
