= Cedars (album) =

Studio album by Clearlake
- Released: February 3, 2003
- Recorded: 2002
- Genre: Indie rock
- Length: 42:17
- Label: Domino
- Producer: Simon Raymonde

Clearlake chronology
Lido (2001)	Cedars (2003)	Amber (2006)

Professional ratings
Review scores
Source	Rating
AllMusic	3/5 stars
Pitchfork	9.1/10

Cedars was the second album released by Clearlake, in 2003, two years after their debut release, Lido. It includes the single "Almost the Same", and both tracks from the double A-side "The Mind Is Evil"/"Come Into the Darkness". The album also includes a secret hidden track. It is located in the pregap before the first track on the CD.

== Track listing ==
No.	Title	Length
1.	"Almost the Same"	3:56
2.	"The Mind is Evil"	3:48
3.	"Wonder if the Snow Will Settle"	3:22
4.	"Can't Feel a Thing"	3:00
5.	"I'd Like to Hurt You"	3:46
6.	"Come Into the Darkness"	4:12
7.	"Just Off the Coast"	2:51
8.	"Keep Smiling"	2:39
9.	"It's All Too Much"	4:29
10.	"Treat Yourself With Kindness"	5:51
11.	"Trees in the City"	4:20
Total length:		42:17

== Personnel ==
- Irvin Baker – Mixing
- James Butcher – Percussion, Drums, Group Member
- Clearlake – Engineer
- Matthew Cooper – Layout Design, Collage
- Jason Evans – Photography
- Giles Hall – Engineer, Mixing
- Sam Hewitt – Guitar, Keyboards, Vocals, Group Member
- Sean Magee – Mastering
- Tobias May – Engineer
- Jason Pegg – Guitar, Keyboards, Vocals, Producer, String Arrangements, Group Member
- Simon Pegg – Lighting, Pyrotechnics
- Simon Raymonde – Producer, Mixing
- David Woodward – Bass, Guitar, Vocals, Group Member
