= Rob Chapman (journalist) =

English music journalist & rock musician

Rob Chapman (born 1954) is an English music journalist and rock musician, best known as the vocalist for the defunct post-punk band the Glaxo Babies.

== Biography ==
He was the singer with the Bristol-based band the Glaxo Babies and with the British alternative rock band The Transmitters, a music journalist for Mojo and other magazines and newspapers, he made some broadcasting with the BBC National Network, wrote some books, including an acclaimed Syd Barrett biography, Syd Barrett: A Very Irregular Head (2010), and a rock-novel, Dusk Music (2008).

In 2007 he was appointed Senior Lecturer in Music Journalism at the University of Huddersfield.

== Discography ==
Vocals, with the Glaxo Babies

- This Is Your Life, EP, Heartbeat Records, 1979
- Christine Keeler, single, Heartbeat Records, 1979
- Various, Avon Calling – The Bristol Compilation, 33t, Heartbeat Records, 1979 ("It's Irrational"); 2×CD, Cherry Red, 2005 ("It's Irrational", "This Is Your Life", "Who Killed Bruce Lee?", "Christine Keeler", "Nova Bossa Nova")
- Various, Labels Unlimited – The Second Record Collection, 33t, Cherry Red, 1979. ("Who Killed Bruce Lee?")
- Peel session, 17/04/1979, BBC Radio One, diffusion 26/04/1979. ("It's Irrational", "Who Killed Bruce Lee?", "Burning", "She Went To Pieces").
- Put Me On The Guest List, LP, RTC/Heartbeat Records, 1980; CD, Birdsong/Hayabusa Landings (J), 2007
- Dreams Interrupted: The Bewilderbeat Years 1978–1980, CD-compilation, Cherry Red, 2006
- The Porlock Factor: Psych Dreams and Other Schemes 1985–1990, CD-compilation, Cherry Red, 2007

Vocals with The Transmitters

- And We Call That Leisure Time, LP, Heartbeat Records, 1981; CD, Birdsong (J), 2007
- Peel session, Transmitters, 22/07/1981, BBC Radio One, diffusion 29/07/198110. ("Joan Of Arc", "Love Factory", "Dance Craze", "Voodoo Woman In Death Plunge/ The Rent Girls Are Coming")

== Bibliography ==
- Rob Chapman, Psychedelia and Other Colours, Faber & Faber, 2015. ISBN 978-0-571-28275-3 (Pop culture/history)
- Rob Chapman, Syd Barrett: A Very Irregular Head, Faber & Faber (UK), 2010. ISBN 978-0-571-23854-5 / Da Capo Press (US), 2010. ISBN 978-0-306-81914-8 (Biography)
- Rob Chapman, Dusk Music, Flambard Press, 2008. ISBN 978-1-873226-95-7 (Novel)
- Rob Chapman, Album Covers From The Vinyl Junkyard, Booth-Clibborn Editions, 1997 et 2000. ISBN 978-1-86154-075-1 (From a show at the Bluecoat Gallery, Liverpool, 1996.)
- Rob Chapman, Selling the Sixties: The Pirates and Pop Music Radio, Routledge, 1992. ISBN 0-415-07970-5 (From his M.Phil. in mass communications at the University of Leicester.)
