= Loop Guru =

English worldbeat group

- Origin: United Kingdom
- Genres: Worldbeat, ambient, dubtronica, psybient
- Years active: 1985–present
- Members: Salman Gita (born Sam Dodson); Jamuud (born David Muddyman)

Loop Guru is a worldbeat group consisting of bassist/guitarist Salman Gita (born Sam Dodson) and programmer Jamuud (born David Muddyman). They first met around 1980 and initially played together in The Transmitters and released their debut single as Loop Guru, "Shrine", in 1992. The band's music is a melange of Asian and Western music, infusing Western dance beats with the rich textures and sounds of Indonesian gamelan and traditional Indian music. Heavy emphasis is placed on electronic samples of traditional instruments, voices, and miscellaneous sounds.

Loop Guru's main exuberant oeuvre of lively rhythms and effusive sounds is occasionally punctuated by more contemplative albums (e.g., The Third Chamber) that are reminiscent and influenced by ambient music and similar to musical artists such as Brian Eno and Jon Hassell. Past and present guest musicians and collaborators include Natacha Atlas, Sussan Deyhim, Mad Jym, Count Dubulah (also known as Nick Page, Psycho Karaoke and Dub Colossus) and Cat von Trapp.

Their single "Paradigm Shuffle", one of their more popular releases, was built around "I Have a Dream", Martin Luther King Jr.'s 1963 speech.

Muddyman died on 27 March 2022.

== Discography ==
=== Albums ===
- Duniya (The Intrinsic Passion of Mysterious Joy) (1994)
- The Third Chamber (1994)
- Amrita (...All These and the Japanese Soup Warriors) (1995)
- Catalogue of Desires Vol. 3: The Clear White Variation (1996)
- Moksha...Peel to Reveal/The Peel Sessions (1996)
- Loop Bites Dog (1997)
- The Fountains of Paradise (1999)
- Loopus Interruptus...Forgotten Treasures & Lost Artifacts (compilation of singles, 2001)
- Wisdom of the Idiots...Half a History and a History and a Half (best of compilation, 2003)
- Bathtime with Loop Guru (2003)
- Elderberry Shiftglass (2006)

=== Singles ===
- "Shrine" / "Mrabat" (1992)
- "Paradigm Shuffle" / "Hope" (1993)
- "Sussantics" (1993)
- Shrinic Visions EP (1994)
- "The Third Chamber" (hour-long "single") (1995)
- "Through Cinemas" (1995)
- "Possible Futures: Fourplay" (1995)
- "Sheikh" (1996)
- "Skin Heaven" (1997)
