= Amber (Clearlake album) =

Studio album by Clearlake
- Released: 23 January 2006
- Genre: Indie
- Length: 44:33
- Label: Domino
- Producer: Jim Abbiss, Jason Pegg

Clearlake chronology
Cedars (2003)	Amber (2006)

Professional ratings
Review scores
Source	Rating
AllMusic	4/5 stars
Pitchfork Media	7.4/10

Amber is the third album by indie rock group Clearlake, released on January 23, 2006, on Domino Records. The seventh track from the album, "Finally Free", was featured on Eden Games' 2006 videogame release, Test Drive Unlimited. The song "No Kind of Life" appeared in the movie Awake.

== Track listing ==
No.	Title	Length
1.	"No Kind of Life"	3:33
2.	"Getting Light Outside"	3:45
3.	"Amber"	3:42
4.	"Good Clean Fun"	3:54
5.	"Here to Learn"	3:02
6.	"You Cant' Have Me"	4:33
7.	"Finally Free"	3:32
8.	"Dreamt that You Died"	3:29
9.	"Far Away"	2:59
10.	"Neon"	3:48
11.	"I Hate It, I Got What I Wanted"	3:16
12.	"Widescreen"	5:00
Total length:		44:33
