= Stealing Orchestra =

- Origin: Porto, Portugal
- Genres: Experimental Music, Pop, Rock, Electronica
- Years active: 1997–present
- Labels: NorteSul; Zounds; You Are Not Stealing Records
- Members: João Mascarenhas
- Past members: André Nunes; Andreia Macedo; Armando Brás; Fernando Sousa; Gustavo Costa; Henrique Fernandes; Joana Oliveira; João Negreiros; Paulo Fialho; Pedro Costa; Pedro Marques; Pedro Moreira; Pedro Vidal
- Website: www.myspace.com/stealingorchestra

Stealing Orchestra is a band from Porto, Portugal that explores music through sampling and real instruments since 1997.

A review by Cool & Strange Music Magazine in 2000 gives a general idea of the music by Stealing Orchestra even if there were many changes in the line-up or musical creation:

"No matter how off the map Mascarenhas' musical funhouse gets, with things running backward and jumping in at the most inappropriate spots, there is always the semblance of a song. His mixed madness has a definite lounge and pop bent to it - yet there is also a strong Portuguese/Spanish flavor. Think of all faux Spanish music that exists out there, then try to imagine what would happen if someone from the area began lampooning American culture with that inherent style. It's like a soundtrack a spy movie ran through a blender."

== Discography ==
=== Albums ===
2011 Deliverance (You Are Not Stealing Records)
2003 The Incredible Shrinking Band (Zounds/Sabotage)
2000 Stereogamy (Nortesul/EMI-VC)

=== EP's ===
2004 The Haunted and Almost Lost Songs 97-98 (You Are Not Stealing Records)
2004 Bu! (You Are Not Stealing Records)
2001 É Português? Não Gosto! (You Are Not Stealing Records)

=== Compilations ===
2011 Futuro Primitivo
2006 Calling All Fiends
2006 Saudade: V.A. from Atlantic Coast
2005 Portugal: A New Sound Portrait
2005 Bor Land Can Take You Anywhere You Want
2005 No Noise in Porto Vol.1
2003 Offline 1
2002 Your Imagination
2002 Cais do Rock Vol.4
2000 PressOn

All EP's were released by their own netlabel You Are Not Stealing Records and are free to download.

== Band members ==
João Mascarenhas also Srosh Collective, Salvatore, Dr. Phibes & The Ten Plagues of Egypt, G.G.Allin's Dick
Pedro Costa also Party People in a Can
Gustavo Costa also Srosh Collective, Genocide, Motornoise, F.R.I.C.S., Lost Gorbachevs, Most People Have Been Trained to Be Bored, Children for Breakfast & a lot more including collaborations with Barbez, Três Tristes Tigres, Damo Suzuki & John Zorn

== Trivia ==
- The album Deliverance includes excerpts of an interview with Colin McGinn from the BBC series The Atheism Tapes
- Covered songs: Star Wars Theme, Twilight Zone Theme, Hava Nagila, Katioucha, For Me Formidable, Summer of 42, Maravilhoso Coração Maravilhoso, Oye Como Va, Anniversary Song and Tetris Theme.
- Mixed bands: Mão Morta, The Legendary Tiger Man, Supernova, Bildmeister, Alla Pollaca, Kubik e Holocausto Canibal
- The band won 5 Press Awards and 1 Best Experimental Demo Award in the Portuguese Prémios Maquete 1998 with their first demo
- Stereogamy and The Incredible Shrinking Band were considered by Portuguese press as two of the best albums of 2000 and 2003 respectively
- The retail chain Fnac included The Incredible Shrinking Band in a book with the 231 best Portuguese albums of the last 50 years.
