= Transglobal Underground =

English electro-world music group

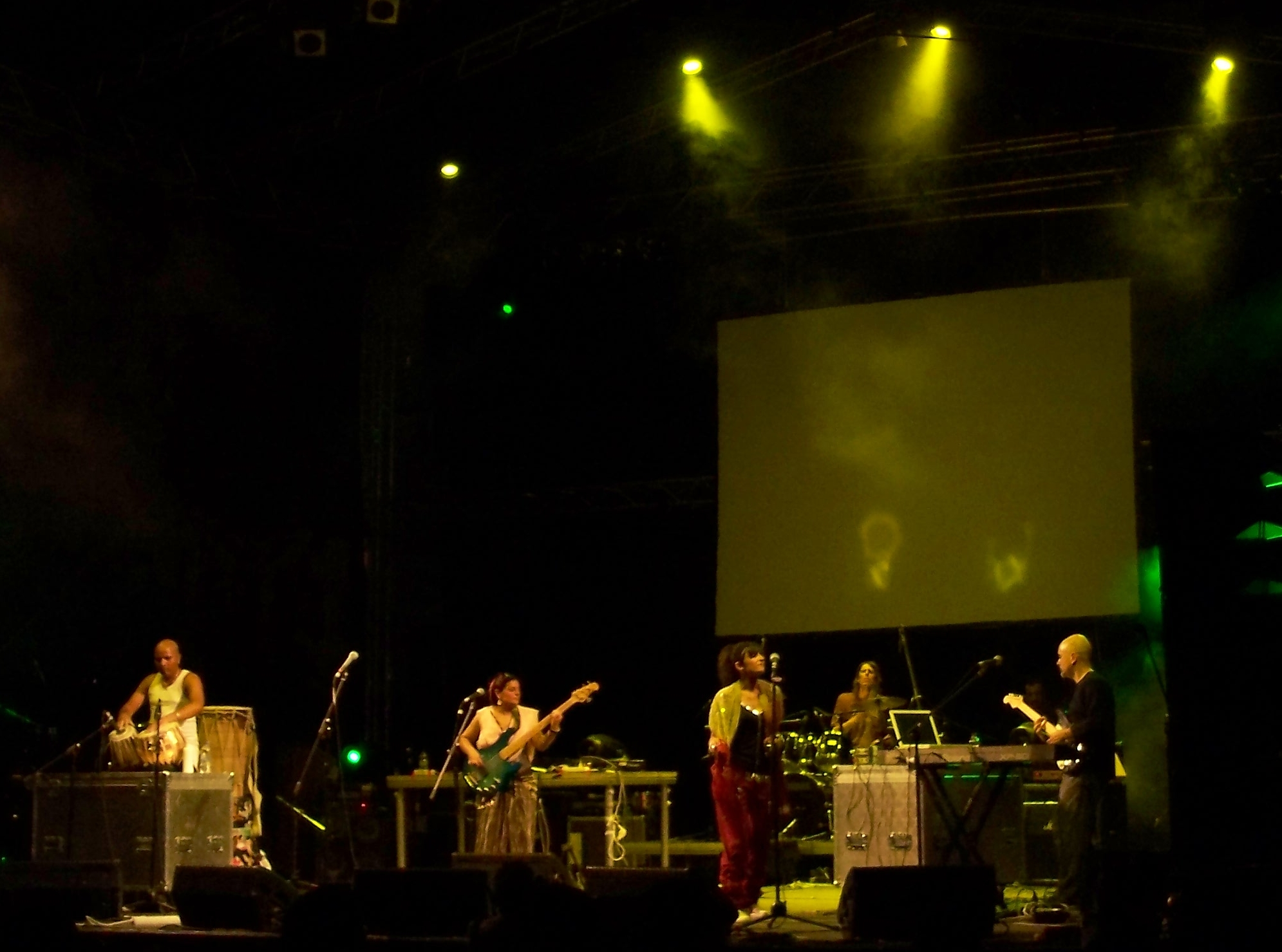
- Transglobal Underground performing on World Music Day (21 June) 2007 at Kotzia Square, Athens, Greece

Background information
- Also known as: TGU
- Origin: London, England
- Genres: folk rock, electronic rock
- Years active: 1990–present
- Label: Nation
- Members: Alex Kasiek (Tim Whelan); Hamid Mantu (Hamilton Lee); Natacha Atlas
- Past members: Johnny Kalsi; others, see section
- Website: TransglobalUnderground.net

Transglobal Underground (sometimes written as Trans-Global Underground) is an English folk rock music group, specializing in a fusion of western, Asian and African music styles (sometimes labelled world fusion and ethno techno). Their first four albums featured Natacha Atlas as lead singer, and their single "Temple Head" was used in a Coca-Cola advertising campaign for the 1996 Olympic Games. In 2008 they won the BBC Radio 3 Award for World Music after the release of their seventh official album, Moonshout. Their most recent release is 2020's Walls Have Ears, marking Atlas' return as a guest with the group. Their work has been described as "a collision of tradition and innovation."

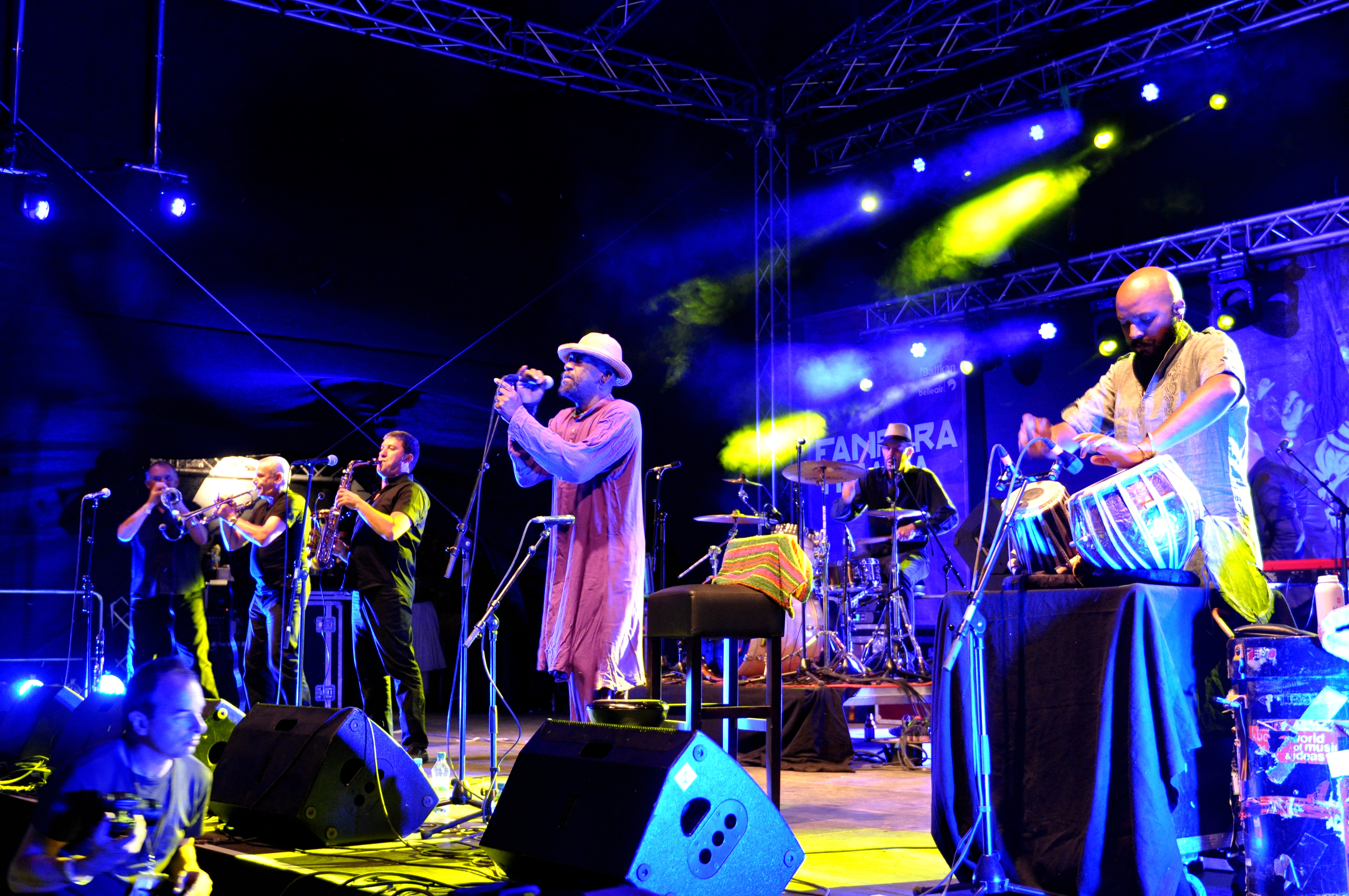
Transglobal Underground with Fanfare Tirana 2015 at the Horizonte world music festival at Ehrenbreitstein Fortress

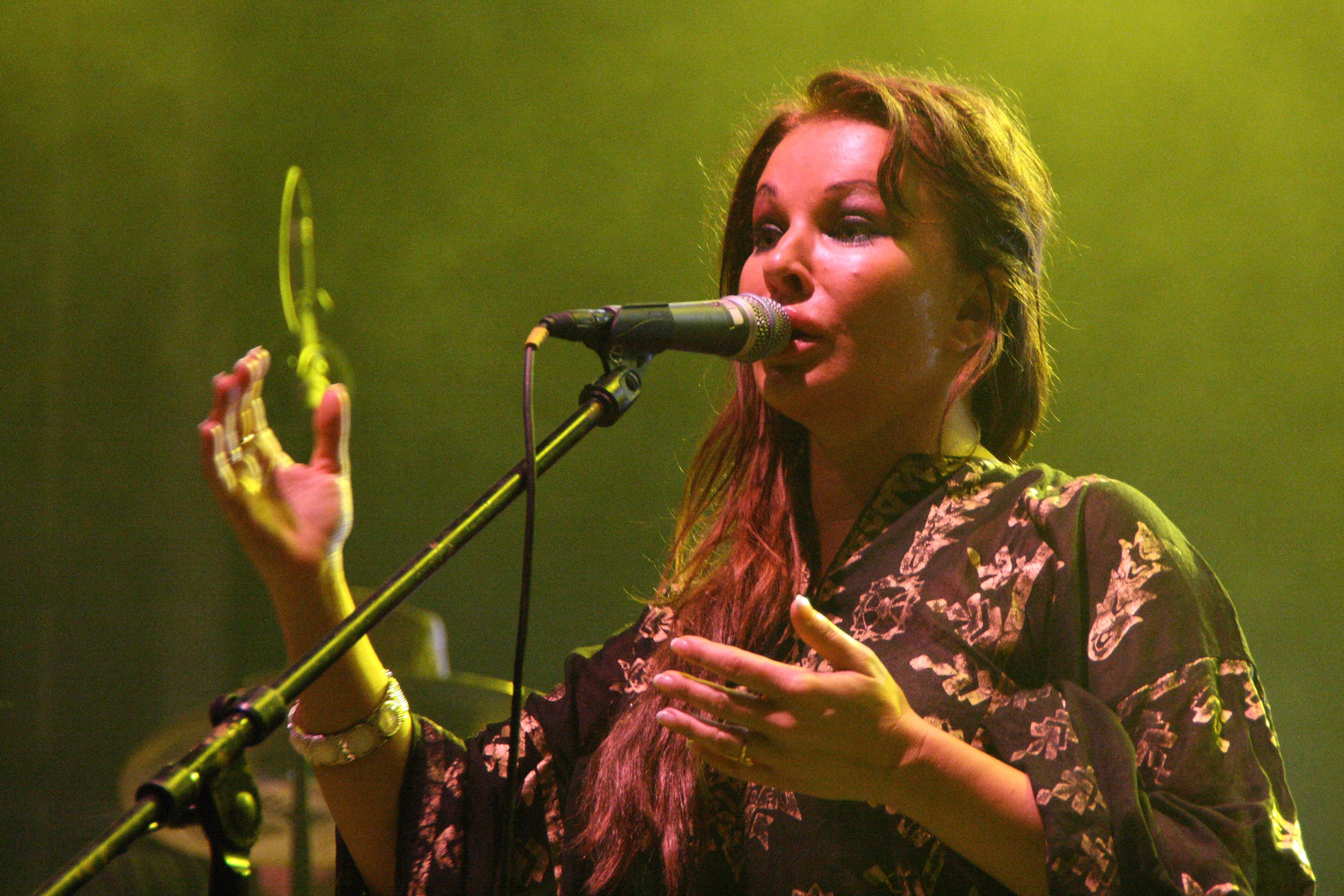
Natacha Atlas, concert with Transglobal Underground 2009 at the TFF Rudolstadt festival

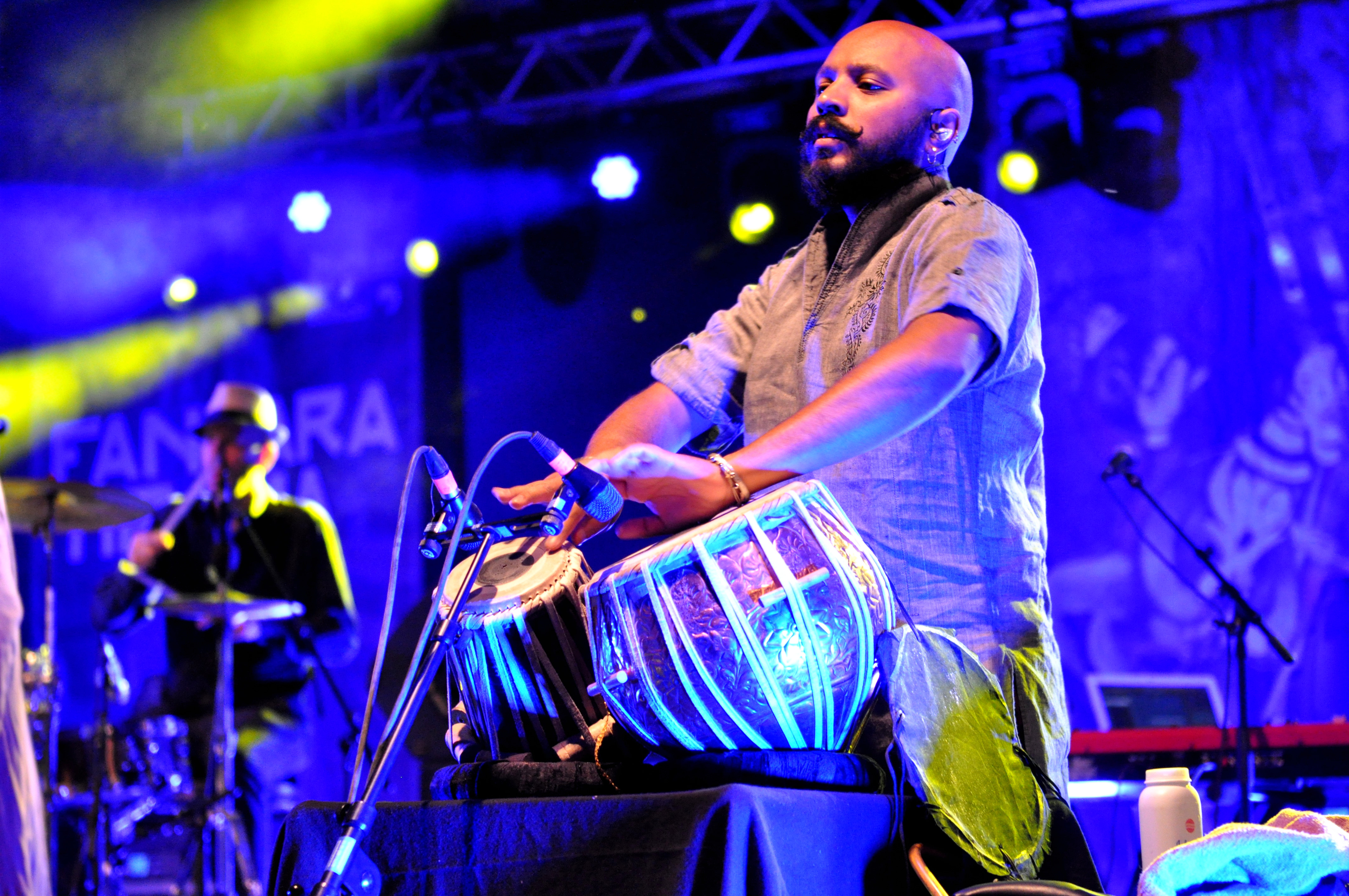
Transglobal Underground 2015 at the Horizonte world music festival at Ehrenbreitstein Fortress

== Membership and pseudonyms ==
Although Transglobal Underground has always had a fluid line-up, the two core members of the group are Tim Whelan (keyboards, guitar, flute, melodica, programming, vocals) and Hamilton Lee (percussion, drums, keyboards, programming). Throughout the group's history, Whelan and Lee have deliberately clouded their identities via multiple pseudonyms and obscure credits - Whelan generally operating under the alias of "Alex Kasiek" and Lee under the alias of "Hamid Mantu" (also "Hamid Man Tu"). Whelan has also used his "Alex Kasiek" pseudonym outside TGU work (sometimes combining it with his real name, as he did for his guest appearance on the 2002 Project Dark album Gramophone De Luxe) and has sometimes implied that Kasiek is a separate person.

Other musicians who have been long-time TGU members or associates include:

- Natacha Atlas (vocals)
- Count Dubulah (real name Nick Page - bass, sampler)
- Neil Sparkes (percussion)
- Johnny Kalsi (dhol)
- Coleridge (rapping)
- G Sihra (dhol)
- TUUP (an acronym for "The Unorthodox Unprecedented Preacher", real name Godfrey Duncan - vocals, percussion)
- Sheema Mukherjee (sitar)
- Larry Whelan (saxophone, clarinet, ney, shenai, string arrangements)

Artists who have made guest appearances on TGU albums include:

- Aki Nawaz (of Fun-Da-Mental)
- Heitham Al-Sayed (of Senser)
- British alternative jazz guitarist Billy Jenkins
- Amanda de Grey (former Transmitters keyboard player)
- Bulgarian harmony singing group Trio Bulgarka
- Albanian brass band Fanfara Itana

Transglobal Underground tracks have been remixed by Dreadzone, Lionrock and Youth and they in turn have remixed tracks for Warsaw Village Band, Banco de Gaia, Fun-Da-Mental, Grotus, Transjoik, Pop Will Eat Itself and Tragic Roundabout.

== Biography ==
=== Foundation and initial line-up ("Temple Head", Dream of 100 Nations, International Times, Psychic Karaoke) ===
Musical collaborators since their schooldays, Tim Whelan and Hamilton Lee were previously both founding members of British pop band Furniture and had played with the experimental psychedelic art-punk group The Transmitters. While with Furniture, both musicians had already demonstrated an interest in world music by bringing in more culturally-diverse instrumentation to what was originally a fairly conventional rock band line up (Lee had played tongue drums and other percussion in addition to his standard drumkit, while Whelan had supplemented his guitar playing with extensive use of the Chinese yangqin zither). Following the break-up of Furniture, Whelan and Lee worked together as part of the Flavel Bambi Septet (an Ealing-based world music band with a shifting line-up including other Transmitters members and future TGU member Natacha Atlas).

Transglobal Underground was first formed when Whelan and Lee teamed up with a third musician, Nick Page. All three took on pseudonyms for the project, which they have determinedly maintained (albeit with variations) up until the present day. Whelan became "Alex Kasiek", Lee "Hamid Mantu" and Page "Count Dubulah". The first recording by the group was the single "Temple Head" which was shopped around various labels before eventually being released by Nation Records in 1991. Although not a major hit, it was named "Single of the Week" in Melody Maker a publication that frequently reviewed and promoted the group, and heavily featured at clubs such as Whirl-Y-Gig. The group was quickly signed to Deconstruction Records, for whom they recorded an album. The label, however, declined to release the album, which eventually saw the light of day on the Nation label in 1994 as Dream of 100 Nations. This album marked the group debut of Natacha Atlas, formerly best known for her work with Jah Wobble's Invaders of the Heart, with percussionist Neil Sparkes joining at around the same time.

TGU developed a reputation for flamboyant live performances featuring dramatic costumes, belly dancing, endless percussion and members of the group disguised as Nepalese Temple guardians. The group released their second album International Times, later in 1994. This was followed in 1995 by the remix album Interplanetary Meltdown (with contributions from Dreadzone, Lionrock and Youth amongst others) aimed squarely at commercial club play. After a number of tours around Europe and 1997 (and the Psychic Karaoke album), Dubulah and Sparkes left to form Temple of Sound.

=== Second and third line-ups (Rejoice Rejoice, Yes Boss Food Corner) ===
A new TGU line-up emerged in 1998 with the album Rejoice Rejoice, partly recorded in Hungary and featuring a number of Hungarian gypsy musicians, plus percussionist Johnny Kalsi from the Dhol Foundation. The group toured Europe supporting Jimmy Page and Robert Plant. Atlas then left the group to concentrate on her burgeoning solo career, with which Kasiek and Mantu were already heavily involved as producers. Transglobal Underground subsequently also parted company with Nation Records (who released a compilation album, 1991-1998: Backpacking on the Graves of Our Ancestors, in 1999).

In 2001, Transglobal Underground released the album Yes Boss Food Corner on Mondo Rhythmica (part of the Ark 21 label), featuring Zulu vocalist Thobekile Doreen Webster (with whom, outside the band, Mantu and Kasiek would continue to work as producers until her death in 2010). The seven-piece line-up of this period (including British-born Asian musicians sitarist Sheema Mukherjee and percussionist Gurjit Sihra) played all over the world and toured the US twice. After the demise of Ark21, Transglobal Underground spent some time working in Egypt, notably with Egyptian vocalist Hakim.

=== Fourth line-up (Impossible Broadcasting, further work with Natacha Atlas, U.N.I.T.E) ===
On their return from Egypt, Kasiek and Mantu set up their own Mule Satellite label for their 2005 album Impossible Broadcasting. For the next tour, the live band (now stripped down to a five-piece and with, once more, a more club-based line-up) started playing the UK regularly for the first time in more than six years, turning up regularly at festivals and venues throughout the country. A flurry of studio activity in 2007 resulted in a collaboration with Real World act The Imagined Village (which won a Radio 2 Folk Award), another remix album (Impossible Re-Broadcasts), the release of the seventh Transglobal Underground album (the Radio-3-award-winning Moonshout) and the soundtrack to the film Whatever Lola Wants. The latter two projects were collaborations with Natacha Atlas, who had returned to closer work with the core band. In 2009, Nascente Records released a double CD compilation of the group's entire history to date, under the title 'Run Devils and Demons.'

Towards the end of 2009, Transglobal Underground took a break from their live schedule to work on a new project which was released in May 2010 as an album entitled 'A Gathering of Strangers' under the name U.N.I.T.E. (an acronym of Urban Native Integrated Traditions of Europe). Drawing traditional sources from all across Europe, the album contains performances by artists from the UK, Poland, Bulgaria, the Czech Republic, Ireland, Hungary, France and Denmark. Amongst the featured vocalists are Yanka Rupkina, Stuart A Staples of Tindersticks, Jim Moray, and Martin Furey of the High Kings.

=== 2012-2019 ===
Transglobal Underground's next major project was with the River of Music festival in London, for which they put together a group consisting of artists from all the Arabic Persian Gulf nations. Entitled 'In Transit' this project still continues in London, although, as often with Transglobal Underground, under a number of aliases.

In 2012, Transglobal Underground released their first record for a label other than Mule Satellite since 2005, a collaboration with Albanian brass band Fanfara Tirana. The album, entitled 'Kabatronics' was put out on the World Village label, a subsidiary of Harmonia Mundi. The tour acts toured extensively for two years.

In 2017, Natacha Atlas, although still primarily a solo artist, returned to performing regularly with the group. This led to other earlier members rejoining for a tour of France, notably Page and original tabla player Inder Goldfinger. A compilation of Transglobal Underground's best known work with Atlas was released under the name Destination Overground, and a further single "The Colours Started to Sing Again" followed in 2019.

=== Pandemic and post-pandemic ===
The groups most recent album, 'Walls Have Ears' was recorded in 2019 and enjoyed its greatest success on Bandcamp, being released in the middle of the most intense period of lockdowns in 2020. In 2021 they continued their online work with a one-year Bandcamp subscription project, releasing one album and various extra tracks a month available only to subscribers. One of these albums, a re-working of 'A Gathering of Strangers' as a protest against the UK leaving the EU, was released publicly. Transglobal Underground have made some of the other work available on occasions, but most remains unreleased publicly. Some of these sessions include their last work with Page, who died that year.

Transglobal Underground made a return to the UK stage in 2022, finally being able to play 'Walls Have Ears' live, and have been touring regularly since then, the lineup being centered around Whelan, Mantu, Mukherjee, Tuup and percussionist Rav Neiyyar, with Natacha Atlas still guesting on occasion.

== Discography ==
=== Albums ===
Italic numbers indicate peak positions on the UK Albums Chart

- Dream of 100 Nations, 1993, No. 45
- International Times, 1994, No. 40
- Psychic Karaoke, 1996, No. 62
- Rejoice Rejoice, 1998
- Yes Boss Food Corner, 2001
- Impossible Broadcasting, 2004
- Moonshout, 2007
- The Stone Turntable, 2011
- Kabatronics, 2013
- Walls Have Ears, 2020
- A Gathering of Strangers, 2021
- Sitar Monday, 2022

=== Compilation and remix albums ===
- Interplanetary Meltdown, 1995 (remix album)
- Backpacking on the Graves of Our Ancestors, 1999 (greatest hits album with some new tracks and mixes)
- Impossible Re-Broadcasting, 2007 (remix album)
- Run Devils and Demons, 2009 (2 CD compilation of TGU's career)
- Digging the Underground Volume 1: The Nation Years, 2016 (collection of unreleased tracks)
- Destination Overground, 2017 (compilation of TGU with Natacha Atlas and three new tracks)

=== DVD ===
- Trans-Global Underground: A film by Guillaume Dero 2008 (documentary and live recording)

=== Singles ===
Year	Single	Peak positions		Album
Year	Single	UK	US Dance	Album
1991	"Templehead"	—	—	singles only
1992	"Immortality" (promo only)	—	—	singles only
1992	"I, Voyager"	—	—	Dream of 100 Nations
1993	"Shimmer"	—	—	Dream of 100 Nations
1993	"Temple Head" (new remixes)	—	—	Dream of 100 Nations
1993	"Sirius B / Zombie'Ites"	—	—	Dream of 100 Nations
1994	"Earth Tribe / Slowfinger"	—	—	International Times
1994	"Protean"	—	—	International Times
1994	"Lookee Here"	86	—	International Times
1995	"International Times"	97	—	International Times
1995	"Templehead" (US only)	—	14	International Times
1996	"Boss Tabla EP"	—	—	Psychic Karaoke
1997	"Chariots" (promo only)	—	—	Psychic Karaoke
1997	"Eyeway Souljah" (promo only)	—	—	Psychic Karaoke
1998	"Body Machine" (promo only)	—	—	Rejoice Rejoice
2001	"Spellbound"	—	—	Yes Boss Food Corner
2001	"Drums of Navarone" (promo only)	—	—	Yes Boss Food Corner
2005	"Impossible Broadcasting Remixes EP" (promo only)	—	—	Impossible Broadcasting
2008	"Dancehall Operator" (promo only)	—	—	Moonshout
2011	"Deolali Junglee" (promo only)	—	—	The Stone Turntable
2013	"No Guns to the Wedding" (promo only)	—	—	Kabatronics (as "Fanfara Tirana meets Transglobal Underground")
"—" denotes releases that did not chart or were not released.
