= Furniture (band) =

British new wave band

- Origin: London, England
- Genres: New wave, post-punk, synth-pop
- Years active: 1979–1991
- Labels: Survival Records (1986); Stiff/ZTT (1986–1990); Arista (1989–1991)
- Members: Jim Irvin; Sally Still; Maya Gilder; Hamilton Lee; Tim Whelan; Larry N'Azone

Furniture were a British new wave band, active from 1979 to 1991. The band's 1986 single "Brilliant Mind" reached the UK Top 30.

The longest-serving line-up of Furniture (from 1983 to 1990), comprised founder members Jim Irvin (vocals), singer/multi-instrumentalist Tim Whelan and drummer Hamilton Lee, plus bass player/occasional singer Sally Still and keyboard player Maya Gilder. Larry N’Azone (saxophone) was an occasional member during this period and often appeared with the band live. Furniture's chief success was in the UK but they also enjoyed a following throughout Eastern Europe where they toured in 1987 and 1988.

Noted for the bad luck and practical frustration that prevented them from making a long term-breakthrough, Furniture have been described as "one of the most unfortunate of bands, and a salutory lesson for any young hopefuls being courted by minor labels."

After the band's break-up, Whelan and Lee went on to form Transglobal Underground, while Irvin and Still became British music journalists (as well as continuing their work in music, predominantly as songwriters).

== Musical style ==
Furniture's musical style was eclectic and has been described as a fusion of "new wave, jazz, blues, post-punk, alt-rock, and about a dozen other genres with some of the most poetic lyrics ever written." The band was also noted for the quality of its compositions, hailed as "storytelling songwriting at its best."

== History ==
=== Formation and early releases (1979–1984) ===
Furniture was formed in 1979 in the Ealing area of London, England by Jim Irvin, Tim Whelan and Hamilton Lee. Simon Beaton (guitar) and Ian Macdonald (bass) joined shortly afterwards, and together Furniture played their first gig in 1979. In 1981, the band set up their own independent record label (The Guy from Paraguay) and released their first single, "Shaking Story"/"Take a Walk Downtown". In the same year, Tim Whelan joined the Transmitters as lead vocalist. He would remain in The Transmitters until 1989 but would continue working with Furniture at the same time. (Hamilton Lee would also divide his time between Furniture and The Transmitters during 1988 and 1989).

Shortly after the release of the debut single, Macdonald and Beaton left the band. Furniture remained a trio (with contributions by bass player Tim Beaton) until full-time bass player Sally Still and keyboard player Maya Gilder joined in 1983. Tim Whelan's brother Larry N'Azone also joined as part-time saxophonist. In 1983, Furniture released a mini-album entitled When the Boom Was On, on the Premonition imprint of the Ealing-based Survival record label.

Switching fully to Survival in spring 1984, Furniture released their second single, "Dancing the Hard Bargain", which was produced by former Blue Zoo member Tim Parry. This was followed in December 1984 by "Love Your Shoes", produced by Troy Tate (former guitarist for the Teardrop Explodes). A self-produced EP – I Can't Crack – followed in the summer of 1985. Much of the material on these releases was collected on a 1986 Japan-only LP on Survival, called The Lovemongers.

=== Stiff Records period – "Brilliant Mind" and The Wrong People (1986–1987) ===
In 1986, Furniture signed to a higher-profile independent label, Stiff Records, and released the sardonically wistful single "Brilliant Mind". The song peaked at number 21 in the UK Singles Chart. It was accompanied by a moody, jazz-inspired video clip recorded at the Wag Club in Soho, London (on the same day and with the same director and setting as Dave Stewart & Barbara Gaskin's version of "The Locomotion"). Irvin apparently wrote the song while travelling back from a London dole office on the top of a bus.

"Brilliant Mind" remains Furniture's most popular song, still receiving airplay on British radio stations. It has also become a staple of many 1980s compilation albums, and was nominated by Boy George as his favourite record of the period. It has been used as TV incidental music (e.g., on World Shut Your Mouth for the character with the cymbals) and was re-recorded for use in the John Hughes film Some Kind of Wonderful.

The band's follow-up to "Brilliant Mind" was a re-recorded version of the earlier single "Love Your Shoes". Although this became a radio hit, it fell foul of a financial crisis at Stiff Records, who couldn't afford to press enough records to match demand. Although discouraged by the setback, Furniture went on to record their first album of new material, The Wrong People. Advance orders for the album were fulfilled by Stiff Records with a single pressing of 30,000 copies, which sold out quickly. Shortly afterwards, Stiff Records succumbed to its financial problems and went into liquidation.

=== Exile (1987–1989) ===
Following Stiff's bankruptcy, the company's assets and catalogue were sold to another label, ZTT, who pressed no further copies of The Wrong People.

The band spent the next three years extricating themselves from the Stiff contract. During this time they toured the world with the assistance of the British Council, which allowed them to hone their sometimes reluctant performance skills. Whelan recalls that while touring Jordan in 1987 "we played a great big theatre in Amman in front of the Crown Prince. We'd been a shambolic indie band, turning our back to the audience. Suddenly we found we had to put on a show." Other countries in which Furniture performed during this period were Egypt (in which Whelan and Lee were introduced to "a huge pop music tradition that gave nothing to, and took nothing from, England", which in turn would influence their later work in Transglobal Underground), Cyprus, Turkey, Greece, Czechoslovakia, Yugoslavia and Romania (when they arrived "at the end of (the) Ceaușescu (period). It was all radically different: a new and nasty experience.")

=== The Arista period – Food, Sex & Paranoia (1989–1990) ===
By 1989, Furniture had resolved their contractual problems and signed to a major label – Arista Records. Under the new contract, the band recorded another album, Food, Sex & Paranoia, which was produced by Mike Thorne and released in February 1990. The album featured Whelan and Lee's growing and prominent use of instruments which were not generally used in Western pop music – such as tongue drums and the yangqin zither – which presaged their later work in Transglobal Underground. The album was preceded in October 1989 by the single "Slow Motion Kisses". A second single "One Step Behind You" was released alongside the album. Unfortunately, the three years of lawsuits had dissipated Furniture's career momentum and media profile, and the album was not a commercial success.

=== Final year and break-up (1990–1991) ===
Despite this and further setbacks – including the departure of Maya Gilder early in 1990 – Furniture continued working, with the remaining members dividing Gilder's keyboard playing role between themselves. The band also played a series of higher profile gigs, one of which was a headlining slot on the second stage at the 1990 Reading Festival. With the Arista contract now over, Furniture returned to their first record label, Survival.

Furniture set up plans to put together a compilation album of past work to entice a new major label contract, as well as beginning recording sessions for a new album. Plans for the compilation were complicated and blocked by legal problems regarding rights for both the Stiff and Arista material.. Two songs for the intended new album ("How I’ve Come to Hate the Moon" and "Farewell") were recorded at Survival Studios, but the sessions were curtailed when the studios were shut down.

The band decided to split up and the compilation album – now titled She Gets Out the Scrapbook: The Best of Furniture – was released on vinyl and CD by Survival in 1991. It compiled all of the band's singles (with the exception of "Shaking Story" and "Take a Walk Downtown") and also included "How I’ve Come to Hate the Moon" and "Farewell", which now served as the band's final output.

== Post-Furniture activities ==
=== Subsequent projects ===
From 1992, Tim Whelan and Hamilton Lee went on to enjoy success with their subsequent project, Transglobal Underground, a world-dance troupe with an ever-changing line-up. Prior to this, they spent some time in the Ealing-based world music band The Flavel Bambi Septet, which also included various members of The Transmitters and other local bands.

After the demise of Furniture, Jim Irvin joined Melody Maker as a journalist, writing under the pseudonym of "Jim Arundel". He subsequently became the founding features editor at Mojo, eventually becoming the magazine's senior editor and compiling the book "The Mojo Collection" (the music bible which featured in the TV series "Gilmore Girls"). Irvin has also continued with his musical career as songwriter, producer and occasional performer. In the early 1990s he formed the short-lived keyboards-and-voice duo Because with jazz musician Chris Ingham, recording one album (Mad Scared Dumb and Gorgeous, released on Haven Recordings in 1991). Working with the Domino Recording Company, Irvin set up the Dusty Company imprint and released an album by the band Clearlake (which he also produced). He also collaborated with the band Gay Dad, co-writing songs which appeared on their 1999 album Leisure Noise. In 2002 Irvin signed a new deal as a songwriter with Warner Chappell, initially specialising in dance music with acts Special Unit and Miami Ice. He has written songs for David Guetta, Lissie, Simple Plan and Lana Del Rey.

Sally Still became a Melody Maker journalist at the same time as Irvin, writing under the name of "Sally Margaret Joy". She was later involved in promoting, encouraging and managing female underground rock acts (partially inspired by the Riot Grrl movement). Still has also written, and sung on, dance music records including "Better Than Perfect" by Miami Ice.

In addition, Jim Irvin and Sally Still have maintained their own partnership and continued to write songs together, including the Michael Gray international house music hit, "The Weekend" (with Gray).

After leaving Furniture, Maya Gilder became a producer at the BBC World Service.

In the early 1990s, Sally Still and Hamilton Lee played as members of the band Catwalk (a musical project by the journalist Chris Roberts). They were both featured on the 12-inch single 'Damascus' (1991).

=== Reissue programme ===
As of 2010, the band's pre-Arista back catalogue became available for MP3 download.

A remastered and expanded version of the ill-fated The Wrong People was reissued on CD by Cherry Red Records on 19 April 2010 (the album first release on CD). The reissue included nine additional tracks: the B-sides "To Gus", "Turnupspeed", "Me, You & the Name", "It Continues" and "Brilliant Fragments" along with the extended remixes of "Brilliant Mind" and "Love Your Shoes" and two previously unreleased demos ("That Man You Loved" and "Never Said"). The band contributed a track-by-track commentary and photos from their personal archives to the sixteen-page covering booklet, which also featured an introductory essay by veteran British music journalist and longterm fan Chris Roberts (who had also collaborated with several members of Furniture in his own band, Catwalk).

In 2019, Emotional Rescue reissued Furniture's debut, six-song mini-album, When the Boom Was On (1983) and an EP of 12" mixes called On Broken Glass.

== Band members ==
=== Full members ===
- Jim Irvin – vocals, percussion, occasional keyboards, synclavier (1979–1991)
- Tim Whelan – vocals, guitars, piano, organ, keyboards, yangqin (1979–1991)
- Hamilton Lee – drums, tuned and untuned percussion) (1979–1991)
- Sally Still – bass guitar, vocals (1983–1991)
- Maya Gilder – organ, keyboards (1983–1990)
- Simon Beaton – guitar (1979–1981)
- Ian Macdonald – bass guitar (1979–1981)

=== Part-time members ===
- Larry N'Azone – saxophone (1983–1991)
- Tim Beaton – double bass (1983)

== Discography ==
=== Studio albums ===
- When the Boom Was On (September 1983), Premonition Records
- The Wrong People (November 1986), Stiff Records
- Food, Sex & Paranoia (February 1990), Arista Records

=== Compilation albums ===
- The Lovemongers (June 1986), Premonition Records – compilation of singles and demos originally compiled for the Japanese market
- She Gets Out the Scrapbook: The Best of Furniture (September 1991), Survival Records
- The Wrong People (April 2010), Cherry Red
- On Broken Glass EP (April 2019), Emotional Rescue

=== Singles ===
- 1981: "Shaking Story" b/w "Take a Walk Down Town"
- April 1984: "Dancing the Hard Bargain" b/w "Robert Nightman's Story"
- December 1984: "Love Your Shoes" b/w "Escape into My Arms" and "The Script"
- May 1985: "I Can't Crack" b/w "I Can't Crack" (Broken Mix), "Switch Off" and "Pause"
- May 1986: "Brilliant Mind" b/w "To Gus" (also on 12" single with "Brilliant Mind" (Extended Mix), "To Gus" and "Brilliant Fragment") – UK No. 21
- October 1986: "Love Your Shoes" b/w "Turnupspeed", (also on 12" single with "Love Your Shoes" (Extended Mix) and "Me, You and the Name") – UK No. 101
- October 1989: "Slow Motion Kisses" b/w "40 Hours in a Day" (also on 12" single and CD with "40 Hours in a Day", "Brilliant Mind" and "She Gets Out the Scrapbook")
- February 1990: "One Step Behind You" b/w "It Continues" (also on 12" single and CD with "One Step Behind You" (Mark McGuire Club Remix), "It Continues" and "International People")
- August 1991: "Brilliant Mind" (reissue) b/w "On a Bus with Peter Nero" (also on 12" with "On a Bus with Peter Nero" and "Brilliant Mind" (Extended Mix))
