= Lido (Clearlake album) =

Studio album by Clearlake
- Released: 26 March 2001
- Recorded: 2000
- Genre: Indie rock
- Length: 42:29
- Label: Domino
- Producer: Jim Irvin

Clearlake chronology
Lido (2001)	Cedars (2003)

Professional ratings
Review scores
Source	Rating
AllMusic	1.5/5 stars
Drowned In Sound	9/10 stars
NME	9/10 stars

Lido is the debut album by Clearlake. It was released in March 2001 on Domino Records. The album's singles were "Winterlight", "Don't Let the Cold In", "Something to Look Forward To" and "Let Go".

== Cover ==
The front cover features the Saltdean Lido, situated in the band's hometown of Brighton and Hove.

== Track listing ==
No.	Title	Length
1.	"Clearlake Lido"	1:06
2.	"Sunday Evening"	3:38
3.	"Don't Let the Cold In"	4:32
4.	"Something to Look Forward To"	2:57
5.	"These Things Are Sent to Try Us"	3:47
6.	"I Hang on Every Word You Say"	3:21
7.	"Let Go"	3:56
8.	"Daybreaking"	1:13
9.	"Jumble Sailing"	4:25
10.	"Life Can Be so Cruel"	3:30
11.	"I Want to Live in a Dream"	2:41
12.	"Winterlight"	7:19
Total length:		42:29
