= Brilliant Mind =

Single by Furniture

from the album The Wrong People
- Released: 1986
- Genre: Indie pop; synth-pop
- Length: 3:41
- Label: Stiff
- Songwriters: Jim Irvin; Hamilton Lee; Sally Still; Tim Whelan
- Producer: Mick Glossop

Furniture singles chronology
"I Can't Crack" (1985)	"Brilliant Mind" (1986)	"Love Your Shoes" (1986)

"Brilliant Mind" is a song by the British new wave band Furniture, released in 1986 by Stiff as the lead single from their second studio album The Wrong People. It was written by Jim Irvin, Hamilton Lee, Sally Still and Tim Whelan, and produced by Mick Glossop. "Brilliant Mind" reached number 21 on the UK singles chart and remains the band's only entry on the chart.

The song was featured in the John Hughes film Some Kind of Wonderful (1987).

== Background ==
In 2010, Jim Irvin recalled of the song, "The chorus came to me as I got on a 110 bus in Hounslow, after signing on the dole. The only way was up. And, ironically, this was the song that did it."

Before signing to Stiff Records in 1986, Furniture shopped the demo of "Brilliant Mind" to a number of different record labels. Irvin told Sounds in 1986, "Lots of people turned down 'Brilliant Mind' and we've had to argue against putting a heavy backbeat to it and moving the chorus."

== Music video ==
The song's music video was shot at the Wag Club, Wardour Street, London, in front of an invited audience of the band's friends. Speaking of the video to Record Mirror in 1986, Irvin said, "We had to haul all our friends out of bed at the crack of dawn so we'd have an audience. It looks quite refreshing because it's absolutely bereft of effects – hasn't even got the luxury of colour."

== Critical reception ==
Upon its release, Paul Massey of the Aberdeen Evening Express stated, "Excellent track from a promising London five-piece that twists, turns and grabs your attention: Jim Irvin's vocals are a treat. Hear it." Jerry Smith of Music Week praised it as an "excellently delivered subtle song with echoing guitar line and rousing sax used within an economic arrangement to produce a powerful number". He added, "After a couple of plays its nagging hook becomes not only interesting but memorable as well." Dave Henderson of Sounds called it "not catchy, but average".

In a review of the song's 1991 reissue, Sherman at the Big Controls, writing for NME, described the song as "Pigbag-meets-June Brides indie pop" and noted the "superbly pretentious line" of the chorus. He stated, "Incredible. I put this on at 33 by accident and it sounded like the best Joy Division record ever! Play it at 45 and it's got the best Peter Hook bass riff ever! It actually sounds much better than I remember it five years ago."

== Track listings ==
7–inch single (UK, Germany, France, Italy and Australia)

1. "Brilliant Mind" – 3:43
2. "To Gus" – 2:45

12–inch single (UK and France)

1. "Brilliant Mind" (Extended Mix) – 7:01
2. "Brilliant Mind" (7" Mix) – 3:43
3. "To Gus" – 2:45
4. "Brilliant Mind" (Reprise) – 1:17 (unlisted track)

=== 1991 reissue ===
7–inch single (UK)

1. "Brilliant Mind" – 3:43
2. "On a Bus with Peter Nero" – 4:01

12–inch single (UK)

1. "Brilliant Mind" (Extended Mix) – 7:01
2. "Brilliant Mind" (7" Version) – 3:43
3. "On a Bus with Peter Nero" – 4:01
4. "Brilliant Strings" (Reprise) – 1:17

== Personnel ==
Credits are adapted from The Wrong People vinyl LP liner notes and the UK 12-single vinyl single.

Furniture

- Jim Irvin – vocals
- Tim Whelan – guitar
- Maya Gilder – keyboards
- Sally Still – bass
- Hamilton Lee – drums

Additional musicians

- Larry N'Azone – saxophone
- Charlie Buchannon – strings
- Tim Beaton – strings

Production

- Mick Glossop – producer ("Brilliant Mind")
- Furniture – producers ("To Gus", "On a Bus with Peter Nero")

Other

- Pete Moss – front cover photography (1986 release)
- Henry Bond – back cover photography (1986 release)
- Ryan Art – sleeve design (1991 reissue)

== Charts ==
Chart (1986)	Peak position
UK Singles (Official Charts)	21
