= Hamilton Lee =

English musician (born 1958)

- Born: Hamilton Lee; 7 September 1958 (age 67)
- Origin: London, England
- Genres: Worldbeat, alternative rock, post-punk, psychedelic rock, space rock
- Occupations: Percussionist, songwriter, record producer
- Instruments: Drums, percussion, drum programming, keyboards, sampler, vocals
- Years active: 1979–present
- Labels: Survival, Stiff, Nation

Hamilton Lee (born 7 September 1958 in London, England), also known by variations on Hamid Mantu, is an English musician.

Lee is best known as the drummer, percussionist and co-leader of Transglobal Underground, under his "Hamid Mantu" alias. He was also a core member of Furniture and has played with Natacha Atlas, The Transmitters, Lunar Dunes, Solus 3, Ghost Shirt, Xangbetos, The GaslightTroubadours and the Flavel Bambi Septet as well as various session appearances.

== Musical career ==
=== 1979–1991: Furniture, The Transmitters and others ===
Hamilton Lee was born in London and grew up in the London suburb of Ealing. He was interested in music from an early age, meeting his main collaborators (Tim Whelan and Jim Irvin) when all three were in their teens. Lee began his musical career as an alternative rock musician (albeit one influenced by funk, jazz, theatre and music from a variety of cultures).

Lee's first significant musical project was the new wave band Furniture (best known for their top 30 UK chart hit "Brilliant Mind") for which he, Whelan and Irvin were founder members and contributing songwriters. Lee played drums, percussion and occasional keyboards for Furniture throughout the band's existence between 1979 and 1991 (playing on all four of the band's albums and all of their singles), and helped to bring in relatively unusual instrumentation such as tongue-drum. During the latter half of Furniture's existence, Lee was also a member (alongside Whelan) of the Ealing-based post-punk/psychedelic band The Transmitters, for which he played drums and sampler between 1987 and 1989.

At various points in the 1980s, Lee drummed for various theatre projects by the comedy/drama/"horror-panto" troupe Count of Three in both London and at the Edinburgh Fringe Festival, including versions of The Beggar's Opera, Titus Andronicus and Dr Calamari's Music Hall of the Macabre. In the early 1990s, he contributed drums to Catwalk, a short-lived alternative rock band led by Melody Maker journalist Chris Roberts.

=== Transglobal Underground and Worldbeat; 1992–present ===
During Furniture's globetrotting exile from the UK between 1987 and 1989, Lee performed with the band in Jordan, Egypt, Cyprus, Turkey, Greece, Czechoslovakia, Yugoslavia and Romania. This exposed him further to music from cultures outside the Anglophone rock and pop tradition: African, Arabic, Middle Eastern and Central and Eastern European. Following the break-up of Furniture, Lee became a member of another Ealing-based band, The Flavel Bambi Septet (named after a gas cooker) which specialised in light-hearted but affectionate covers of classic Arabic and Middle Eastern pop music standards, oriental classics, Russian polkas, Nigerian brass band favourites and Klezmer tunes. During its existence, The Flavel Bambi Septet made regular performances at Club Dog and Waterman's Art Centre (in West London) and also made an appearance at the Edinburgh Festival Fringe as the house band for a variety theatre show.

This work (rather than his Furniture contributions) anticipated Lee's most successful project, Transglobal Underground (a.k.a. "TGU"), a musical collective which he set up with Tim Whelan in 1992. Transglobal Underground pioneered the now-common fusion of world music and various club dance music forms now referred to as "worldbeat" and immediately brought it to the mainstream with the single "Temple Head" and a number of successful albums and singles. Lee and Whelan continue to lead the collective to this day and have featured on every single TGU release, generally under a variety of pseudonyms. (Lee's pseudonyms tend to be variations on the name "Hamid Mantu"). Lee contributes drums, percussion, programming, keyboards and sampling to the project and is also responsible for the majority of backing vocals (which he characterises as "DIY choirs and choruses").

Lee was a member of several TGU spin-off projects during the 1990s. In addition to their frequent work with Natacha Atlas, he and Whelan had an alternative duo project called More money than God. Lee was also a member of Xangbetos (with Joe Sax and Transglobal Underground members Neil Sparkes and Doreen Thobekile Webster) who released the Zulu-inspired "Size of an Elephant" EP in 1997.

=== Other projects (Auntie Horror Film, Lunar Dunes, Solus 3) ===
Lee's electronic solo project, Auntie Horror Film, released the Now I See It All album in 1995.

In between his Transglobal Underground commitments, Lee is currently a member of the space rock/improvised Krautrock band Lunar Dunes (with bass player Ian Blackaby and former Cornershop sitarist Adam Blake) who have played with Damo Suzuki and released two albums of their own.

Lunar Dunes' work with additional musicians (including pianist/harpist Julia Thornton, singer and loop processor Krupa MaNomay and frequent Furniture/TGU saxophonist Larry Whelan) led to the creation of a second band, the "post-jazz/post-punk/chamber dub" ensemble Solus 3. Originally conceived as a trio of Lee, Blackaby and Thornton, the group has expanded to include contributions from MaNomay and trumpeter/throat singer Francesco Filizzola (in addition to various guest collaborators). Solus 3 have released two albums to date.

== Session/guest player ==
As a session player or guest musician, Lee has played or programmed for Natacha Atlas, Simple Minds, Jeanette, Fiamma Fumana, Danielle Dax, Loretta Heywood and Jemma Freeman and The Cosmic Something.

== Discography ==
=== Main projects ===
==== with Transglobal Underground: (selected) ====
- "Temple Head" single (1992)
- Dream of 100 Nations album (1993)'
- International Times album (1994)
- Psychic Karaoke album (1996)
- Rejoice Rejoice album (1998)
- Yes Boss Food Corner album (2001)
- Impossible Broadcasting album (2004)
- Moonshout album (2007)
- Run Devils and Demons album (2009)
- A Gathering of Strangers album (2010
- The Stone Turntable album (2011)

==== with Furniture: (selected) ====
- When the Boom Was On mini-album (1983)
- The Lovemongers album (1986)
- The Wrong People album (1986, reissued 2010)
- Food, Sex & Paranoia album (1990)
- She Gets Out the Scrapbook compilation album (1991)

==== with The Transmitters ====
- Count Your Blessings (1987/1989) compilation album (2006)
- I Fear No One compilation album (2007)

==== with Lunar Dunes ====
- From Above album (…. 2007)
- Galaxsea album (4 Zero Records, 2011)

==== with Solus 3 ====
- The Sky Above the Roof album (2010)
- "Tricked By a Monster" 12” single (2011)
- Corner of the World album (2011)

==== with The Xangbetos ====
- "Size of an Elephant" EP (Nation Records, 1997)

==== as Auntie Horror Film ====
- Now I See It All (D.O.R. – ADOR 797 – 1995)

=== As guest/session musician ===
==== with Natacha Atlas ====
- Diaspora album (1995)
- Halim album (1997)
- Gedida album (1998)
- Ayeshtina album (2001)

==== with The Natacha Atlas & Marc Eagleton Project ====
- Foretold in the Language of Dreams album (2002)

==== various ====
- Jeanette: “Hum” single (Survival Records, 1984)
- Catwalk: “Damascus” 12” single (Dedicated, 1991)
- Simple Minds: Neapolis album (Chrysalis Records, 1998)
- Fiamma Fumana: Onda album (Mescal, MES 6832532 – 2006)
