= Clearlake (band) =

English indie rock band

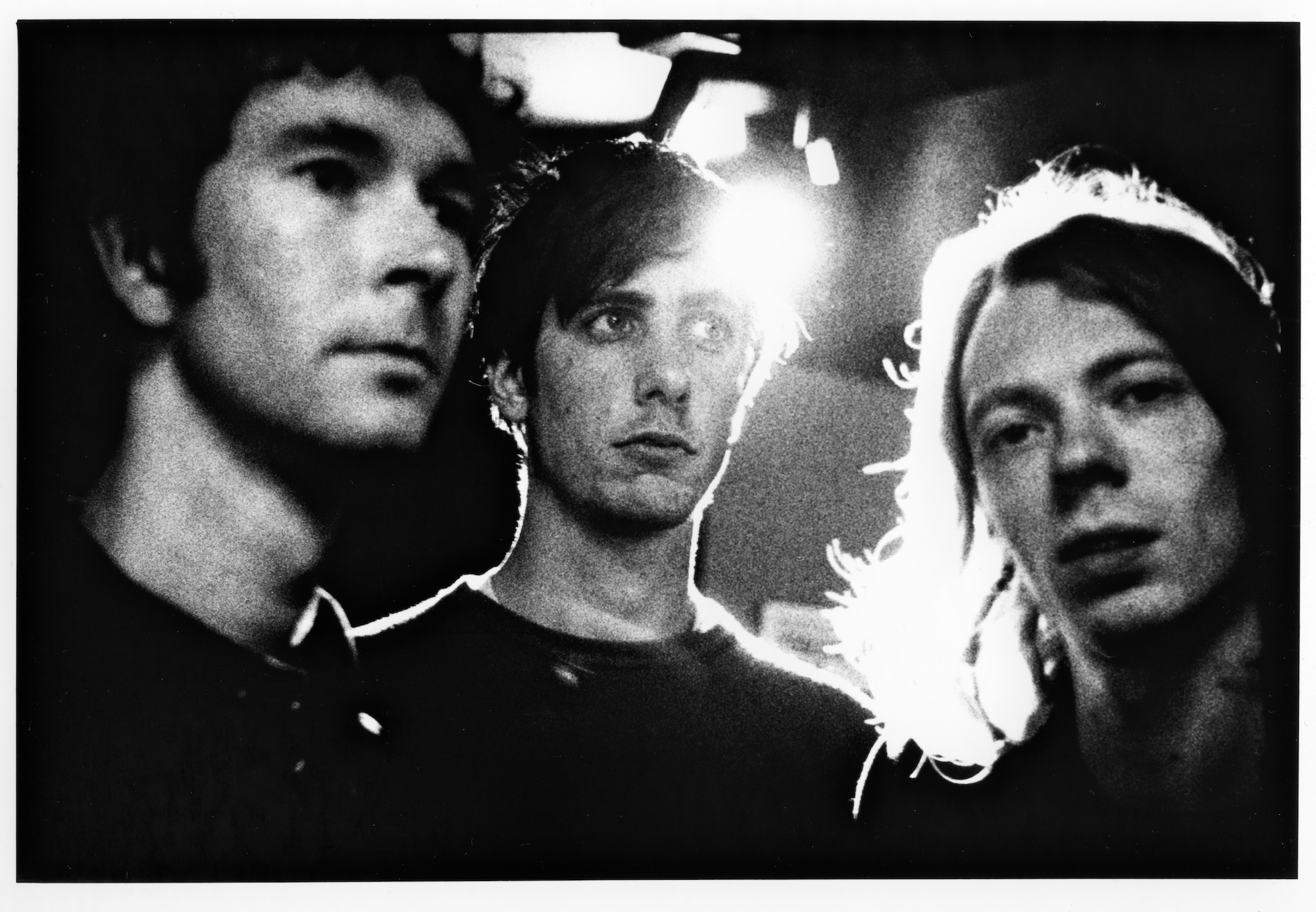
- Clearlake in 2005

Background information
- Origin: Brighton, England
- Genre: Indie
- Years active: 1999–2009, 2024–present
- Label: Domino
- Members: Jason Pegg; David Woodward; Toby May; Jim Briffett
- Past members: James Butcher; Sam Hewitt

Clearlake are an indie rock band, based in Brighton, England. They released three albums between 2001 and 2006, and a fourth in 2025.

== History ==
Originally known as Not Bit Of Wood, in 1998 the band released the single "Bad Hair Day", and John Peel played the B-Side "Perfect Setting" on Radio 1. They then signed to Domino records who asked the group to change their name. As Clearlake they released their debut single, "Winterlight", in January 2000. The limited edition release was awarded Single of the Week in a number of music publications, gained airplay on Radio 1 as Mark and Lard's record of the week and sold out within a fortnight, making the UK Top 100. A number of other singles followed, and the band went on to support Pulp and The Delgados and played at Scott Walker's Meltdown with Elliott Smith.

By April 2001, they had recorded and released their debut album, Lido. After a slot on Later... with Jools Holland, their television debut, and the release of a fourth single, "Let Go", the band started work on their second album. Cedars was released in February 2003. The third, Amber, was released in January 2006.

Clearlake have written their fourth album and played their only show of 2007 at The Brunswick, Hove, on 1 September 2007. Seven new songs were debuted at the show. 2008 was a far more active year for Clearlake. On 6 May 2008 the band supported Death Cab for Cutie (their first show of that year) before recording new track "One of a Kind", which was released as a web-only single on 9 May via their website. A further single, "Dark Blue", was recorded in the same way in August 2008 and released on 1 September 2008. The band started 2009 by releasing one final single from the new album, "The Credit or The Blame". The album from which those singles were taken was not released until 2025.

In December 2010, a Jason Pegg cover version of the Sea Nymphs song "Tree Tops High" appeared on Leader of the Starry Skies - A Loyal Companion, a fundraising compilation album to benefit the hospitalised Cardiacs/Sea Nymphs leader Tim Smith.

In 2024, they released I Get It Now, their first song in 15 years, on Bandcamp. That was followed by further singles Take The Edge Off and One Of A Kind. The band's fourth album and first in 19 years, Dark Blue, was released on Bandcamp on December 5th, 2025.

== Solo activity ==
Jason Pegg has played solo and with Billy Bragg. Pegg's self-titled debut album came out in 2009, and Silver Noise was released as a download-only album in 2014. Jim Briffett had performed with The Miserable Rich and his solo album Mountains 'n' Lightning was released in 2011.

== Lineup ==
=== Last ===
- Jason Pegg (vocals, guitar, keyboards)
- David 'Woody' Woodward (bass, guitar, vocals)
- Toby May (drums)
- Jim Briffett (guitar, vocals) - since 2007

=== Former ===
- James Butcher (drums)
- Sam Hewitt (keyboards, guitar, vocals)

== Discography ==
=== Albums ===
- Lido (2001)
- Cedars (2003)
- Amber (2006)
- Dark Blue (2025)

=== Singles and EPs ===
- "Winterlight" (2000)
- "Don't Let the Cold In" (2000)
- "Something to Look Forward To" (2000)
- "Let Go" (2001)
- "Almost the Same" (2003)
- "The Mind Is Evil" (2003)
- "Can't Feel a Thing" (2003)
- Wonder if the Snow Will Settle (2005)
- "Good Clean Fun" (2005)
- "Neon" (2006)
- "It's Getting Light Outside" (2006)
- "One of a Kind" (2008)
- "Dark Blue" (2008)
- "The Credit or The Blame" (2009)
- "I Get It Now" (2024)
- "Take The Edge Off" (2025)
