= Jim Irvin =

English singer-songwriter

- Born: James Lawrence Irvin
- Origin: London, England
- Genres: New wave, pop, alternative rock, post-punk, psychedelic rock
- Occupations: Singer-songwriter; musician; music journalist
- Instruments: Vocals, percussion, keyboards, synclavier
- Years active: 1982–present
- Labels: Survival, Stiff, Arista Records
- Website: www.jimirvin.com

James Lawrence Irvin is an English singer, songwriter, music journalist and podcast host. Irvin was a singer in the English new wave band Furniture, who had a UK hit single, in 1986 with Irvin's "Brilliant Mind". Irvin contributed to Melody Maker magazine, before becoming its reviews editor. Later he became the features editor of Mojo magazine. Irving has written or edited a number of books, including The Mojo Collection and Jeff Buckley: From Hallelujah To The Last Goodbye. Irvin returned to songwriting full-time in 2001 including the 2004 hit "The Weekend" by Michael Gray, and the song "Love", co-written with, and performed by, Unloved, introduced the Apple Keynote Speech in March 2019.

== Early life ==
Irvin was raised in west London.

== Career ==
=== Furniture ===
Irvin was the singer in the English new wave band Furniture, who released singles and albums with Survival, Stiff and Arista Records between 1982 and 1990. He co-wrote their 1986 UK hit single, "Brilliant Mind", taken from the album, The Wrong People. The song also appeared in the John Hughes movie, Some Kind of Wonderful and was re-recorded for the soundtrack. Furniture made one further album, Food, Sex & Paranoia, for Arista (1990), and disbanded in 1991. In 1992, Irvin recorded an album, Mad Scared Dumb and Gorgeous with jazz musician Chris Ingham, under the name Because. It was released on Boo Hewerdine's Haven label.

In 2019, Emotional Rescue records reissued Furniture's debut, six-song mini-album, When the Boom Was On (1983) and an EP of 12" mixes called On Broken Glass

=== Music journalism ===
In 1991, Irvin began contributing to Melody Maker magazine, where his work appeared under the name Jim Arundel. He was later made reviews editor. In 1994, reverting to Jim Irvin, he became the founding features editor of Mojo magazine. One of his most notable pieces for the magazine was "Angel of Avalon", a major profile of the late Sandy Denny, published in 1998. He also edited an acclaimed book, The Mojo Collection. He has written for The Word, Time Out, The Sunday Times and The Guardian and continues to write a reissues column for Mojo.

In February 2015, he published an e-book, A Book Of Wild Flowers, which collected his writings on Sandy Denny, Joni Mitchell and Kate Bush.

In May 2018, he co-authored Jeff Buckley: From Hallelujah To The Last Goodbye (Post Hill Press), a biography of Jeff Buckley written with Dave Lory, the singer's former manager.

In 2020, he launched a podcast, “Here’s One I Made Earlier” where he interviewed musical creators about a significant work in their career. The following year he launched a second podcast “You’re Not On The List” dedicated to “forgotten albums and the people who love them”, in which guests nominate undervalued albums and discuss them.

=== Later production and songwriting ===
In 1995, Irvin produced the first demos by the band Gay Dad, and co-wrote some of the songs which later appeared on their debut album, Leisure Noise. Their single, "Oh Jim", was said to be dedicated to him.

In 1999, he produced Lido, the debut album by Clearlake, released in 2000 on his own label, Dusty Company, an offshoot of Domino Records.

Irvin returned to full-time songwriting in 2001, concentrating initially on dance music. He co-wrote the 2004 hit "The Weekend" by Michael Gray, and had work recorded by Groove Armada, Full Intention and David Guetta.

Since 2006, his work has been mostly outside dance music, with artists like Lana Del Rey, Lissie, Simple Plan, Jack Savoretti, Unloved, Nothing but Thieves and Yungblud.

The song "Love", co-written with and performed by Unloved, introduced the Apple Keynote Speech in March 2019.

== Discography ==
Year	Artist	Album	Song	Co-written with	Notes	Chart Position
2023
2023	Nothing But Thieves	Dead Club City	“Welcome To The DCC"	Julian Emery, Nothing But Thieves	“Welcome To The DCC" voted Hottest Record of the Year by BBC Radio 1 listeners.	UK No.1, Netherlands No 1, Australia No.10
2023	Nothing But Thieves	Dead Club City	”Members Only"	Julian Emery, Nothing But Thieves	“Welcome To The DCC" voted Hottest Record of the Year by BBC Radio 1 listeners.	UK No.1, Netherlands No 1, Australia No.10
2022
2022	Man Made Sunshine	"Man-Made Sunshine" EP	"Life's Gonna Kill You If You let It""	Conor Mason, Avi Barath	Single	
2022	Man Made Sunshine	"Man-Made Sunshine" EP	"Big"	Conor Mason, Julian Emery		
2022	Man Made Sunshine	"Man-Made Sunshine" EP	"Little Bird"	Conor Mason, Julian Emery		
2022	Man Made Sunshine	"Man-Made Sunshine" EP	"Rosebud"	Conor Mason, Justin Parker		
2022	Yungblud	Yungblud	"Cruel Kids"	Yungblud, Dan Smith, Andrew Wells, Adam Warrington, Chris Greatti, Matt Schwartz, Gregory 'Aldee' Hein, Jordan Brasko Gable.		No. 1 UK, No.1 IRE, No.1 NL, No.1 Australia, No.1 Austria No.2 BEL, No. 45 US Billboard, No. 7 US Rock
2021
2021	Nothing But Thieves	"Moral Panic II"	“Miracle, Baby"	Julian Emery, Nothing But Thieves		
2021	Nothing But Thieves	"Moral Panic II"	”Your Blood"	Julian Emery, Nothing But Thieves		
2021	You Me At Six	SUCKAPUNCH	"SUCKAPUNCH"	You Me At Six, Julian Emery		UK No.1
2020	You Me At Six	SUCKAPUNCH				UK No.1
2020	Sianon	-	"Sad Bop"	Sianon, Julien Flew	singles	
2020	Sianon	-	"Make Me Jealous"	Sianon, Julien Flew	singles	
2020	Sianon	-	"Cry, Cry, Cry"	Sianon, Julien Flew	singles	
2020	Sianon	-	"Overthinking"	Sianon, Julien Flew	singles	
2020	Stelahr	'Starz'	"Starz"	Stella Franke	single	
2020	Nothing But Thieves	"Moral Panic"	"Real Love Song"	Julian Emery, Nothing But Thieves	"Impossible" voted Radio X Song Of The Year 2020	No.3 UK, No.5 NL, No.8 AUS
2020	Nothing But Thieves	"Moral Panic"	"Impossible"	Julian Emery, Nothing But Thieves	"Impossible" voted Radio X Song Of The Year 2020	No.3 UK, No.5 NL, No.8 AUS
2020	Nothing But Thieves	"Moral Panic"	"Phobia"	Julian Emery, Nothing But Thieves	"Impossible" voted Radio X Song Of The Year 2020	No.3 UK, No.5 NL, No.8 AUS
2020	Nothing But Thieves	"Moral Panic"	"There Was Sun"	Julian Emery, Nothing But Thieves	"Impossible" voted Radio X Song Of The Year 2020	No.3 UK, No.5 NL, No.8 AUS
2020	Nothing But Thieves	"Moral Panic"	"Free If We Want It"	Julian Emery, Nothing But Thieves	"Impossible" voted Radio X Song Of The Year 2020	No.3 UK, No.5 NL, No.8 AUS
2020	BLOXX	"Lie Out Loud"	"Go Out With You"	Julian Emery, BLOXX	singles	
2020	BLOXX	"Lie Out Loud"	"5000 Miles"	Ophelia Booth, Jennifer Decelvio, Julian Emery	singles	
2020	Broken Hands	Split in Two	"Can You Feel It"	Broken Hands, Julian Emery		
2020	Broken Hands	Split in Two	"Lazarus"	Broken Hands, Julian Emery		
2020	Broken Hands	Split in Two	"Wrong Track"	Broken Hands, Julian Emery		
2020	Broken Hands	Split in Two	"Run Away"	Broken Hands, Julian Emery		
2020	Ten Times A Million	Born Tomorrow	"Bye"	Ten Times A Million, Julian Emery	EP	
2020	Ten Times A Million	Born Tomorrow	"Make It Stop"	Ten Times A Million, Julian Emery	EP	
2020	Ten Times A Million	Born Tomorrow	"Born Tomorrow"	Ten Times A Million, Julian Emery	EP	
2020	Ten Times A Million	Born Tomorrow	"Good Times"	Ten Times A Million, Julian Emery	EP	
2020	Airways	'Out Of Luck'	"Out Of Luck"	Jake Daniels, Dom Craik	single	
2020	Lissie	When I'n Alone: The Piano Retrospective	"When I'm Alone"	Lissie, Julian Emery		
2020	Lissie	When I'n Alone: The Piano Retrospective	"in Sleep"	Lissie, Julian Emery		
2019
2019	The Amazons	'Future Dust'	"Doubt It"	The Amazons, Julian Emery, Nick Atkinson	single	
2019	Unloved	Heartbreak	"Devils, Angels"	Keefus Ciancia, Jade Vincent, David Holmes	"Love" used to introduce Apple Keynote, March 2019	
2019	Unloved	Heartbreak	"Love"	Keefus Ciancia, Jade Vincent, David Holmes	"Love" used to introduce Apple Keynote, March 2019	
2019	Unloved	Heartbreak	"Heatbreak"	Keefus Ciancia, Jade Vincent, David Holmes	"Love" used to introduce Apple Keynote, March 2019	
2019	Airways	'Trampoline/The End'	"Trampoline"	Jake Daniels, Dom Craik	single	
2018
2018	Airways	'Blue Gasoline'	"Blue Gasoline"	Jake Daniels, Dom Craik	single	
2018	Airways	'Alien'	"Alien"	Jake Daniels, Dom Craik	single	
2018	Nothing But Thieves	What Did You Think When You Made Me This Way?	"Gods"	Nothing But Thieves, Julian Emery	EP	UK 8 iTunes
2018	Nothing But Thieves	What Did You Think When You Made Me This Way?	"You Know Me Too Well"	Nothing But Thieves, Julian Emery	EP	UK 8 iTunes
2018	Nothing But Thieves	What Did You Think When You Made Me This Way?	"Take This Lonely Heart"	Nothing But Thieves, Julian Emery	EP	UK 8 iTunes
2018	Black Honey	Black Honey	"What Happened To You"	Izzy Bee Philips, Emre Ramazangalou		UK 33
2018	The Wrecks	Panic Vertigo (EP)	"James Dean"	Nick Anderson, Julian Emery		
2018	Lissie	Castles	"Peace"	Lissie, Julian Emery		UK No. 9
2018	Lissie	Castles	"Somewhere"	Lissie, Julian Emery		
2017	Nothing But Thieves	Broken Machine	"I Was Just A Kid"	Nothing But Thieves, Julian Emery		#2 Album UK
2017	Nothing But Thieves	Broken Machine	"Sorry"	Nothing But Thieves, Julian Emery		#2 Album UK
2017	Nothing But Thieves	Broken Machine	"Broken Machine"	Nothing But Thieves, Julian Emery		#2 Album UK
2017	Nothing But Thieves	Broken Machine	"I’m Not Made By Design"	Nothing But Thieves, Julian Emery		#2 Album UK
2017	Nothing But Thieves	Broken Machine	"Get Better"	Nothing But Thieves, Julian Emery		#2 Album UK
2017	Nothing But Thieves	Broken Machine	"Hell Yeah"	Nothing But Thieves, Julian Emery		#2 Album UK
2017	Airways	Starting to Spin EP	"Starting To Spin"	Julian Emery, Jake Daniels and Brian Moroney		
2017	Airways	Starting to Spin EP	"White Noise Boys"	Julian Emery, Jake Daniels and Brian Moroney		
2017	Airways	Starting to Spin EP	"One Foot"	Julian Emery, Jake Daniels and Brian Moroney		
2017	Airways	Starting to Spin EP	"Mate"	Jake Daniels and Dom Craik		
2016	Lissie	My Wild West	"Ojai"	Julian Emery, Lissie		#16 UK Album #9 Norwegian Albums
2015	Nothing But Thieves	Nothing But Thieves	"Excuse Me"	Julian Emery, Nothing But Thieves		Album UK No. 7
2015	Nothing But Thieves	Nothing But Thieves	"Graveyard Whistling"	Julian Emery, Nothing But Thieves		Album UK No. 7
2015	Nothing But Thieves	Nothing But Thieves	"Hostage"	Julian Emery, Nothing But Thieves		Album UK No. 7
2015	Nothing But Thieves	Nothing But Thieves	"Trip Switch"	Julian Emery, Nothing But Thieves		#1 Single Alternative Songs – Billboard
2015	Nothing But Thieves	Nothing But Thieves	"Tempt You (Evocatio)"	Julian Emery, Nothing But Thieves		Album UK No. 7
2015	Nothing But Thieves	Nothing But Thieves	"Hanging"	Julian Emery, Nothing But Thieves		Album UK No. 7
2015	Nothing But Thieves	Nothing But Thieves	"Neon Brother"	Julian Emery, Nothing But Thieves		Album UK No. 7
2015	Nothing But Thieves	"Ban All the Music" (single)	"Ban All the Music"	Julian Emery, Nothing But Thieves		
2014	Chlöe Howl	"Rumour" (single)	"Rumour"	Julian Emery, Chlöe Howl		
2014	Lewis Watson	The Morning	"Stones Around the Sun"	Julian Emery, Lewis Watson		UK No. 28
2014	Lower Than Atlantis	Lower Than Atlantis	"Live Slow, Die Old"	Julian Emery, Lower Than Atlantis		Album UK No. 12
2014	Lower Than Atlantis	Lower Than Atlantis	"Time"	Julian Emery, Lower Than Atlantis		
2014	Lower Than Atlantis	Lower Than Atlantis	"Number 1"	Julian Emery, Lower Than Atlantis		
2014	Nothing But Thieves	Graveyard Whistling EP	"Graveyard Whistling"	Julian Emery, Nothing But Thieves		
2014	Nothing But Thieves	Graveyard Whistling EP	"Last Orders"	Julian Emery, Nothing But Thieves		
2014	Pixie Lott	Pixie Lott	"Break Up Song"	Rami Afuni, Pixie Lott		Album UK No. 15
2014	Pixie Lott	Pixie Lott	"Oceans"	Pixie Lott, Jerry Abbott		
2014	Pixie Lott	Pixie Lott	"Leaving You"	Pixie Lott, Jerry Abbott		
2014	Ruth Lorenzo	Planeta Azul	"Dancing in the Rain"	Julian Emery, Ruth Lorenzo	Spanish Eurovision entry. Placed 9th.	
2013	Lissie	Back to Forever	"Shameless"	Julian Emery, Lissie	single	Album UK No. 16
2013	Lissie	Back to Forever	"Further Away (Romance Police)"	Julian Emery, Lissie	single	
2013	Lissie	Back to Forever	"The Habit"	Julian Emery, Lissie		
2013	Lissie	Back to Forever	"What's It Like"	Julian Emery, Lissie		
2013	Lissie	Back to Forever	"They All Want You"	Lissie, Angelo Petraglia		
2013	Ryan Beatty	"Chameleon"	"Chameleon"	Julian Emery, Ryan Beatty, Elisabeth Maurus	Single	
2013	Ryan Beatty	"Chameleon"	"Love Will Come My Way"	Julian Emery, Ryan Beatty, Elisabeth Maurus	Single	
2013	Gabrielle Aplin	English Rain	"Start of Time"	Julian Emery, Gabrielle Aplin		UK No. 2
2013	Gavin DeGraw	Make a Move	"Every Little Bit"	Julian Emery, Gavin Degraw		US No. 10
2013	Josh Krajcik	Blindly, Lonely, Lovely	"Her Song”	Julian Emery, Josh Krajcik		
2013	Lee DeWyze	Frames	"You Don't Know Me"	Julian Emery, Lee DeWyze		US No. 116
2013	Alex Hepburn	Together Alone	"Get Heavy"	Julian Emery, Alex Hepburn		France No. 2
2013	Alex Hepburn	Together Alone	"Crown of Thorns"	Julian Emery, Alex Hepburn		
2012	Lana Del Rey	Born to Die	This Is What Makes Us Girls	Tim Larcombe, Lana Del Rey		UK No. 1, US No. 2
2012	Various Cruelties	Various Cruelties (2012)	"Beautiful Delerium”	Julian Emery, Liam O'Donnell		
2012	Jack Savoretti	Before the Storm (2012)	"Lifetime"	Julian Emery, Jack Savoretti		
2012	Halestorm	The Strange Case Of... (2012)	"Rock Show"	Julian Emery, Lzzy Hale		US No. 15, UK 49
2012	Halestorm	The Strange Case Of... (2012)	"Don’t Know How to Stop"	Julian Emery, Lzzy Hale		US No. 15, UK 49
2012	Audra Mae and The Almighty Sounds	Audra Mae and The Almighty Sounds (2012)	"Jebidiah Moonshine's Friday Night Shack Party"	Julian Emery, Audra Mae		
2011	Simple Plan	Get Your Heart On	"Freaking Me Out"	Julian Emery, Chuck Comeau, Pierre Bouvier		CAN No. 2
2011	Simple Plan	Get Your Heart On	"Astronaut"	Julian Emery, Chuck Comeau, Pierre Bouvier		
2011	Simple Plan	Get Your Heart On	"Fire in My Heart"	Julian Emery, Chuck Comeau, Pierre Bouvier		
2011	David Cook	This Loud Morning	"Paper Heart"	Julian Emery, David Cook		US No. 7
2011	David Cook	This Loud Morning	"We Believe"	Julian Emery, David Cook		
2011	Michelle Branch	The Loud Music Hits EP	"Loud Music"	Julian Emery	single	
2010	Lissie	Catching a Tiger	"When I'm Alone"	Julian Emery, Lissie		UK No. 12
2010	Lissie	Catching a Tiger	"In Sleep"	Julian Emery, Lissie		
2010	Lissie	Catching a Tiger	"Loosen the Knot"	Julian Emery, Lissie		
2010	Lissie	Catching a Tiger	"Cuckoo"	Julian Emery, Lissie		
2010	Boyzone	Brother	"Separate Cars”	Julian Emery, Jack McManus, Jon Green		UK No. 1
2010	Zucchero Fornaciari	Chocabeck	"Devil in the Mirror"	Zucchero Fornaciari		Italy No. 1
2010	Zucchero Fornaciari	Chocabeck	"Spirit / Together"	Zucchero Fornaciari, Iggy Pop		
2007	David Guetta	Pop Life	"Do Something Love"	Garraud, David Guetta, Ben Chapman, Juliet Richardson		France No. 2
2007	Groove Armada	Soundboy Rock	"From the Rooftops”	Jack McManus, Andy Cato, Tom Findlay		UK No. 10
2004	Michael Gray	"The Weekend" (single)	"The Weekend”	Oliver Cheatham, Michael Gray, Sally Still		UK No. 7

== Bibliography ==
=== Essays and reporting ===
- Irvin, Jim (December 2014). "The birth & death of Pink Floyd : the long goodbye". Mojo. 253 (6): 74–84.
- — (December 2014). "Kismet, Hardy". File Under. Mojo. 253 (6): 112. Review of five albums by Françoise Hardy.
