= Mick Glossop =

English record producer

Mick Glossop is an English record producer and recording engineer best known for long-term collaboration with Van Morrison, as well as his work with Frank Zappa, The Waterboys, The Wonder Stuff, Public Image Limited, Lloyd Cole and others, as well as being the chief engineer of The Town House and Manor Studios.

== Career ==
Glossop was initially known for recording and producing for new wave and punk bands such as Magazine, Public Image Ltd, the Ruts, the Skids and Penetration, but also had success working with many other artists, including roots reggae artist Delroy Washington, German post-punk band Xmal Deutschland, Kevin Coyne, the Waterboys, Jaki Whitren, Furniture, the Wonder Stuff, Frank Zappa, Paul Brady, Ian Gillan, RiTA, John Lee Hooker and Lloyd Cole. Glossop was one of the original designers and chief engineer of Manor Studios and The Town House.

Since 1976, he has worked extensively with Van Morrison, for whom he has recorded and/or mixed 21 albums.

In 2009, he was awarded a Visiting Professorship at Leeds College of Music. In 2010, he was presented with the Music Producers Guild (UK) awards for Recording Engineer of the Year and Live Album of the Year.

In recent years, Glossop has worked on new albums with Sebastopol and Phil "Swill" Odgers.
