= Natacha Atlas discography =

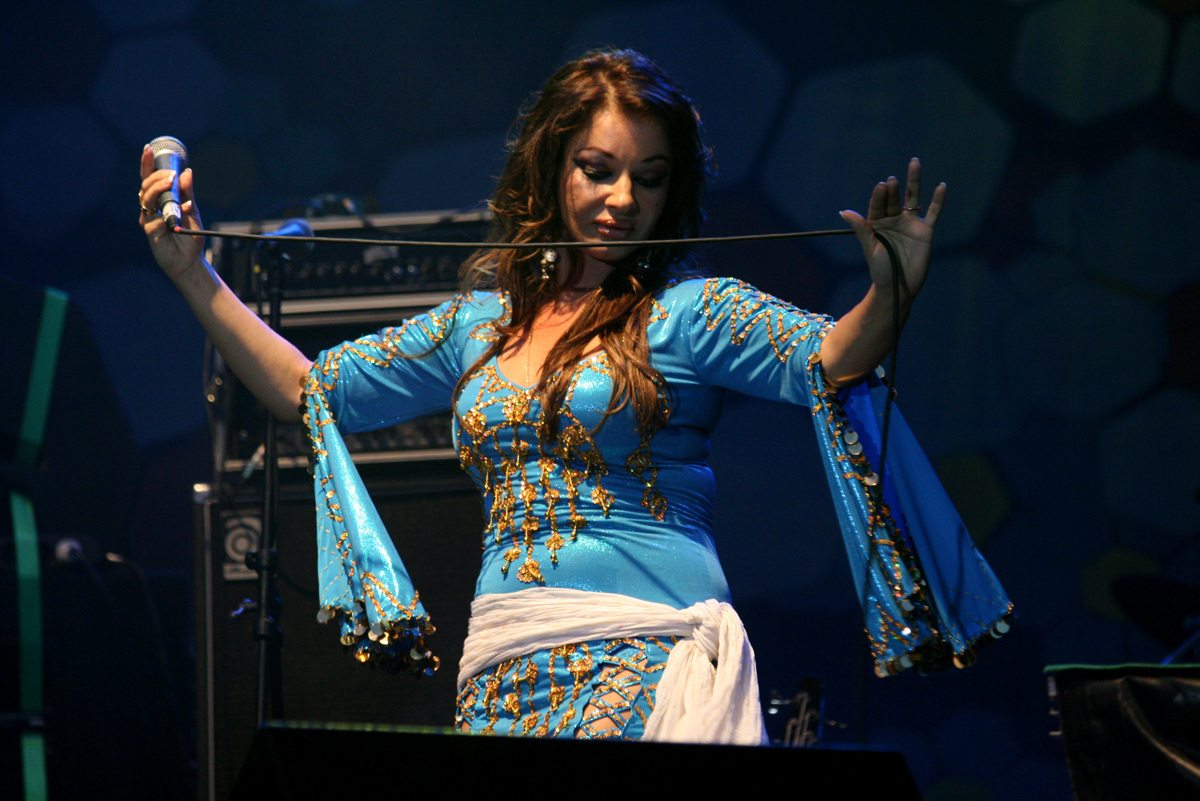
- Atlas performing in 2008
- Studio albums: 9
- Live albums: 1
- Compilation albums: 4
- Singles: 18
- Video albums: 1
- Music videos: 10

The discography of Natacha Atlas, a Belgian world music singer, consists of nine studio albums, one live album, four compilation albums, 18 singles, and one video album. She debuted in the early 1990s, appearing on albums recorded by ¡Loca! and Jah Wobble's Invaders of the Heart. In 1993, Atlas joined ethnic electronica group Transglobal Underground as the lead singer and belly dancer.

Atlas released her solo debut studio album Diaspora in March 1995. The album is a hybrid of genres, combining trance, techno and traditional Arabic music. It reached number 123 on the United Kingdom albums chart and produced three singles. Halim, her second studio album, was released in May 1997. It featured collaborations with duo Sawt El Atlas and Egyptian composer Essam Rashad. In the UK, the album peaked at number 128. Atlas' third album, Gedida, followed in March 1999. It reached number 19 on the French albums chart and produced her first top-twenty single, "Mon Amie La Rose". Atlas released her fourth studio album Ayeshteni in May 2001. It peaked at number 36 in France and number 46 in her native Belgium.

After a two-year hiatus, Atlas released her sixth studio album Something Dangerous in May 2003. Featuring collaborations with British composer Jocelyn Pook and Irish singer Sinéad O'Connor, the album reached number 13 on the United States Billboard World Music Albums chart. The Best of Natacha Atlas, a compilation album, and its companion video album followed in 2005. Released in April 2006, Atlas' seventh studio album Mish Maoul reached number 12 on the US World Music Albums chart. Her eighth studio album Ana Hina was released in May 2008. It was recorded with the Mazeeka Ensemble and primarily features acoustic cover versions of songs originally performed by Arabic singers. Atlas' ninth studio album Mounqaliba was released in September 2010; it was preceded by the single "River Man".

== Albums ==
=== Studio albums ===
List of studio albums, with selected details and chart positions
Title	Details	Peak chart positions						
Title	Details	BEL (WA)	FRA	NLD	NOR	SWI	UK	US World
Diaspora	Released: March 1995 (UK); Label: Nation (NATCDM47); Formats: CD, LP, DD	—	—	66	—	—	123	—
Halim	Released: 5 May 1997 (UK); Label: Nation (NATCD1087); Formats: CD, DD, LP	—	—	—	—	—	128	—
Gedida	Released: 9 March 1999 (UK); Label: Mantra (MNTCD #1014); Formats: CD, CS, DD	—	19	—	37	—	—	—
Ayeshteni	Released: 8 May 2001 (UK); Label: Mantra (MNT1024); Formats: CD, DD, LP	46	36	—	—	97	141	—
Foretold in the Language of Dreams (with Marc Eagleton)	Released: 19 August 2002 (UK); Label: Mantra (MNT1029); Formats: CD, DD	—	—	—	—	—	—	—
Something Dangerous	Released: 19 May 2003 (UK); Label: Mantra (MNTCD1035); Formats: CD, DD	—	98	—	—	—	—	13
Mish Maoul	Released: 24 April 2006 (UK); Label: Mantra (MNTCD1038); Formats: CD, DD	—	—	—	—	—	—	12
Ana Hina (with the Mazeeka Ensemble)	Released: 26 May 2008 (UK); Label: World Village (#450005); Formats: CD, DD	—	162	—	—	—	—	—
Mounqaliba	Released: 23 September 2010 (UK); Label: World Village (WVF479048); Formats: CD, DD	—	—	—	—	—	—	—
Myriad Road	Released: 23 October 2015 (France); Label: Decca; Formats: CD, DD	—	110	—	—	—	—	—
Strange Days	Released: 20 September 2019; Label: Whirlwind Recordings; Formats:	—	—	—	—	—	—	—
Parallel Universe - Volume One	Released: 24 July 2026; Label: Mixed Up Records; Formats:	—	—	—	—	—	—	—
"—" denotes a recording that did not chart or was not released in that territory.

=== Live albums ===
List of live albums, with selected details
Title	Details
Expressions: Live in Toulouse	Released: 5 May 2013 (UK); Label: Mazeeka Music (MR0001); Formats: CD, DD

=== Compilation albums ===
List of compilation albums, with selected details
Title	Details
The Remix Collection	Released: 19 September 2000 (UK); Label: Mantra (MNT1022); Formats: CD, LP
The Best of Natacha Atlas	Released: 23 May 2005 (UK); Label: Mantra (MNT1036); Formats: CD, DD
Mounqaliba – Rising: The Remixes	Released: 27 September 2011 (UK); Label: Six Degrees (657036117624); Formats: CD, DD
Habibi: Classics and Collaborations	Released: 8 July 2013 (UK); Labels: Nascente, Demon (NSDCD033); Formats: CD, DD

=== Video albums ===
List of video albums, with selected details
Title	Details
Natacha Atlas / Transglobal Underground	Released: 24 May 2005 (UK); Label: Mantra (MNT10379); Format: DVD

== Singles ==
=== As lead artist ===
List of singles as lead artist, with selected chart positions, showing year released and album name
Title	Year	Peak chart positions			Album
Title	Year	BEL (WA)	FRA	UK	Album
"Dub Yalil"	1994	—	—	—	Diaspora
"Leysh Nat' Arak"	1995	—	—	—	Diaspora
"Yalla Chant"	1995	—	—	—	Diaspora
"Amulet"	1997	—	—	—	Halim
"L'Égyptienne" (featuring Les Négresses Vertes)	1998	—	—	—	Halim
"Mon Amie La Rose"	1999	13	16	—	Gedida
"Mistaneek" (featuring Sawt El Atlas)	1999	—	—	—	Gedida
"Bastet"	1999	—	—	—	Gedida
"One Brief Moment"	1999	—	—	125	Gedida
"Duden"	2000	—	—	—	The Remix Collection
"I Put a Spell on You"	2001	—	—	146	Ayeshteni
"Ne me quitte pas"	2001	—	—	—	Ayeshteni
"Mish Fadilak"	2001	—	—	—	Ayeshteni
"Le Goût Du Pain"	2001	—	—	—	Ayeshteni
"Quand Je Ferme les Yeux" (featuring Myra Boyle)	2003	—	—	—	Something Dangerous
"Man's World"	2003	—	—	—	Something Dangerous
"River Man"	2010	—	—	—	Mounqaliba
"—" denotes a recording that did not chart or was not released in that territory.

=== As featured artist ===
List of singles as featured artist, with selected chart positions, showing year released and album name
Title	Year	Peak chart positions			Album
Title	Year	FRA	NLD	UK	Album
"C'est La Vie" (Jean Michel Jarre featuring Natacha Atlas)	2000	95	60	40	Métamorphoses

== Music videos ==
List of music videos, showing year released and directors
Title	Year	Director(s)
"Leysh Nat' Arak"	1995	Angela Conway
"Yalla Chant"	1995	Angela Conway
"Amulet"	1997	Angela Conway
"Mistaneek"	1999	Angela Conway
"One Brief Moment"	1999	Angela Conway
"Mon Amie La Rose"	1999	Angela Conway
"Mish Fadilak"	2001	Joanna Bailey
"Mish Fadilak" (French version)	2001	Joanna Bailey
"When I Close My Eyes"	2003	Siraj Jhaveri
"Quand Je Ferme les Yeux"	2003	Siraj Jhaveri
"Whatever Lola Wants"	2008	Nabil Ayouch

== See also ==
- List of Natacha Atlas collaborations
- Transglobal Underground discography
