= Natacha Atlas / Transglobal Underground =

Video by Natacha Atlas
- Released: 24 May 2005
- Genres: World music, Electronic music
- Label: Mantra (MNT #10379)
- Directors: Angela Conway, Joanna Bailey

Professional ratings
Review scores
| Source | Rating |
|---|---|
| GlobalRhythm.net | (positive) |

Natacha Atlas / Transglobal Underground is a video album by Belgian singer Natacha Atlas. It was released by Mantra Recordings on 24 May 2005. The video album is a compilation of Atlas' music videos, video filmed with Transglobal Underground, and live performances from Union Chapel in London, England.

== Track listing ==
Natacha Atlas videos

1. "Mistaneek"
2. "Yalla Chant"
3. "Leysh Nat' Arak"
4. "Amulet"
5. "One Brief Moment"
6. "Mon Amie La Rose"
7. "Mish Fadilak"
8. "Mish Fadilak" (French version)
9. "When I Close My Eyes"

Transglobal Underground videos

1. "Temple Head"
2. "Taal Zaman"
3. "Protean"
4. "Lookee Here"

Natacha Atlas Live in Concert at Union Chapel

1. "When I Close My Eyes"
2. "Fakrenha"
3. "Moustahil"
4. "Eye of the Duck"
5. "I Put a Spell on You"
6. "Mon Amie La Rose"
7. Interview
