= The Remix Collection (Natacha Atlas album) =

Remix album by Natacha Atlas
- Released: 19 September 2000
- Genre: Electronica, World music
- Label: Mantra, Beggars Banquet
- Producer: Transglobal Underground, Coldcut, Youth, David Arnold

Natacha Atlas chronology
Gedida (1999)	The Remix Collection (2000)	Ayeshteni (2001)

The Remix Collection is a remix album by Belgian singer Natacha Atlas. It was released by Mantra Records on 19 September 2000.

== Critical response ==
Professional ratings
Review scores
Source	Rating
AllMusic	4/5 stars
Pitchfork Media	8.0/10

In a review for PopMatters, Wilson Neate praised Atlas' mixture of "Arabic vocal styles, Middle Eastern pop and Western electronic dance beats." Pitchfork Media reviewer Mark Richard-San said that The Remix Collection was "just about perfect from the dancefloor perspective" and named the remix of "Amulet" by 16B as the album's best track. Rick Anderson of AllMusic wrote that the album is "as good as one would expect."

== Track listing ==
1. "Mon Amie La Rose" (French remix) - 3:28^{[A]}
2. "Duden" featuring Ashiqali Kham and Nawazish Khan (Talvin Singh remix) - 6:10
3. "Yalla Chant" (Youth remix) - 6:19
4. "Yalla Chant" (Banco De Gaia remix) - 5:22
5. "Amulet" (16B remix) - 8:24
6. "Yalla Chant" (Transglobal Underground remix) - 6:05
7. "Amulet" (TJ Rehmi remix) - 5:26
8. "One Brief Moment" (Klute remix) - 6:04
9. "Bastet" (Bullitnuts remix) - 7:07
10. "Duden" featuring Ashiqali Kham and Nawazish Khan (Spooky remix) - 6:59

Notes

- A Included on the French version only.

== Personnel ==
The following people contributed to The Remix Collection:

- Natacha Atlas – vocals
- Transglobal Underground, David Arnold – production
- Coldcut, Youth – additional production
- Ashiqali Kham, Nawazish Khan – vocals
- Alison Fielding – art direction, design
