= The Best of Natacha Atlas =

Greatest hits album by Natacha Atlas
- Released: 23 May 2005
- Genre: Rock, World music
- Label: Mantra (MNTCD #1036)

Natacha Atlas chronology
Something Dangerous (2003)	The Best of Natacha Atlas (2005)	Mish Maoul (2006)

Professional ratings
Review scores
Source	Rating
Allmusic	4/5 stars
Exclaim!	(positive)

The Best of Natacha Atlas is a compilation album by Belgian singer Natacha Atlas. It was released by Mantra Recordings on 23 May 2005. The album contains previously released and re-recorded material, unreleased remixes, and cover songs.

== Track listing ==
1. "Leysh Nat' Arak" (new version)
2. "Mon Amie La Rose"
3. "Eye of the Duck"
4. "Ezzay"
5. "Fakrenha"
6. "Mistaneek" (2005 edit)
7. "Leysh Nat' Arak" (TJ Rehmi remix)
8. "You Only Live Twice"
9. "Yalla Chant" (2005 edit)
10. "Fun Does Not Exist" (new version)
11. "I Put a Spell on You"
12. "(It's a Man's Man's) Man's World"
13. "Amulet" (2005 edit)
14. "Kidda"
15. "Leysh Nat' Arak" (2005 dub mix)
16. "Le Printemps"
17. "Moustahil" (live) (hidden track)
