= Quand je ferme les yeux =

Single by Natacha Atlas featuring Myra Boyle

from the album Something Dangerous
- B-side: "When I Close My Eyes"
- Released: 2003
- Genre: Electronica
- Length: 3:21
- Label: Mantra
- Songwriters: Brian Higgins, Lisa Cowling, Natacha Atlas
- Producer: Xenomania

Natacha Atlas singles chronology
"Le goût du pain" (2001)	"Quand je ferme les yeux" (2003)	"Man's World" (2003)

"Quand je ferme les yeux" (English: "When I Close My Eyes") is an electronic music song performed by Belgian singer Natacha Atlas and Myra Boyle. It was written by Atlas, Brian Higgins and myra boyle, Lisa Cowling, and produced by Xenomania for Atlas' fifth album Something Dangerous (2003). It was released as a single by Mantra Recordings in 2003.

== Formats and track listings ==
These are the formats and track listings of major single releases of "Quand je ferme les yeux".

CD single
(Released 2003; ATLAS #16)

1. "Quand je ferme les yeux" (Single edit) – 3:21
2. "When I Close My Eyes" (Album version) – 4:31

== Personnel ==
The following people contributed to "Quand je ferme les yeux":

- Natacha Atlas, Myra Boyle – vocals
- Xenomania – production
