= Foretold in the Language of Dreams =

Studio album by The Natacha Atlas & Marc Eagleton Project
- Released: 19 August 2002
- Genre: Ambient, World music
- Label: Mantra Records

The Natacha Atlas & Marc Eagleton Project chronology
Ayeshteni (2001)	Foretold in the Language of Dreams (2002)	Something Dangerous (2003)

Foretold in the Language of Dreams is a 2002 album by Natacha Atlas and Marc Eagleton. It represents a departure from Natacha Atlas' usual music by being more ambient in style.

Foretold in the Language of Dreams includes collaborations with a string of musicians with whom she has never worked previously - Andrew Cronshaw on zither, Syrian qanun player Abdullah Chhadeh, and two tracks with the Greek band Avaton. Despite the liner notes claims of "computer malarkey" being employed, the overall sound is acoustic, a stark contrast to her previous work.

The single "Zitherbell" was used in the end credits of Jonathan Demme's 2002 film The Truth About Charlie, but the song does not appear on the official soundtrack for the movie. Instead Natacha Atlas is listed in the credits of the cast of characters for the film as "The Spirit (Voice)."

MusicOMH noted in its review of the album, it "makes a direct pitch to the intellect, offering complex, dream-like pieces that draw, for their subject matter, on Sufi epigrams and phrases from the work of the Eastern mystic Gurdjieff."

== Track listing ==
1. "Etheric Messages"
2. "Dawn Bayati"
3. "Zitherbell"
4. "Sobek on the Prowl"
5. "Therapeutic Space"
6. "Simun"
7. "Power of Vibrations"
8. "Damascus"
9. "Yeranos"
10. "Meetings with Reconciliation"
11. "Solace"
