= Strange Days =

Strange Days may refer to:

== Film and television ==
- Strange Days (film), a 1995 science fiction film directed by Kathryn Bigelow
- "Strange Days" (Entourage), an episode of the TV series Entourage

== Literature ==
- Strange Days: Fabulous Journeys with Gardner Dozois, a short-story collection by Gardner Dozois
- Strange Days: My Life with and Without Jim Morrison, a memoir by Patricia Kennealy-Morrison
- "Strange Days", a regular section of the magazine Fortean Times

== Music ==
- Strange Days (Doors album), a 1967 album by The Doors
  - "Strange Days" (Doors song), the title track of the Doors album
- "Strange Days" (Matthew Good Band song)
- Strange Days, an album by Government Alpha
- Strange Days (Natacha Atlas album), 2019
- Strange Days (The Struts album), 2020
- "Strange Days", a song by Brazil from The Philosophy of Velocity
- "Strange Days", a song by Creepy
- "Strange Days", a song by Humble Pie, the B-side of the single "Big Black Dog"

== See also ==
- "Strange Daze", a song by Quiet Riot from Rehab
