= Seize the Time (Fun-Da-Mental album) =

Studio album by Fun-Da-Mental
- Released: 1994
- Genres: Hip hop, dance
- Label: Nation
- Producer: Aki Nawaz

Fun-Da-Mental chronology
Seize the Time (1994)	With Intent to Pervert the Cause of Injustice! (1995)

Seize the Time is the debut album by the English group Fun-Da-Mental, released in 1994. It was released in the United States by Mammoth Records.

The album peaked at No. 74 on the UK Albums Chart.

== Production ==
The album was produced by group leader Aki Nawaz. A sarangi passage by Sultan Khan is sampled on "Fartherland". Members of Transglobal Underground contributed to "Mr. Bubbleman".

Seize the Time is a political album; tracks like "Dog Tribe", about the beating of a South Asian man by British skinheads, review racial tensions in England during the 1990s. The album's title is a reference to the Bobby Seale slogan. "Mother India" includes a roll call of notable Indian women.

== Critical reception ==
Professional ratings
Review scores
Source	Rating
AllMusic	4/5 stars
Deseret News	2.5/4 stars
The Encyclopedia of Popular Music	4/5 stars

Trouser Press wrote that, "while there are a few moments of British provincialism on Seize the Time, the long, convoluted album is a powerhouse, jabbing ethnic politics and culture into rap’s rich vein." The Guardian called Seize the Time "a long, browbeating album, but a necessary one," writing that "the incongruity of sitars and tinkling temple bells enhances the effect of DJ Propa-Ghandi's harsh dance beats." Newsday determined that "Fun-Da-Mental overloads its careening tracks in the pulse-quickening style of prime Public Enemy, a solid stylistic touchstone that incidentally sets the record's time frame back a few years."

The Independent noted that "there's an unapologetically macho aggression to their raps, brought into sharp focus when Subi Shah's calm, capable 'Mother India' interrupts the barrage of testosterone-charged agit-pop." The New York Times concluded that, "if their hard-edged music reflects a growing sense among nonwhites that they have little choice but to abandon traditional passiveness, it also reflects a broader and complicated effort to find an identity that transcends their Britishness." The Deseret News stated that "Fun-Da-Mental drives each song's point home with haunting effectiveness."

AllMusic wrote that "the use of an array of classical Indian musical samples, as well as Bollywood soundtracks and live contributions on tablas and flutes, acts as both statement of purpose and the basis of attractive new fusions that would gain more popularity throughout the '90s."

== Track listing ==
Disc one
No.	Title	Length
1.	"Dog Tribe"
2.	"Seize the Time"
3.	"Mera Mazab"
4.	"President Propaganda"
5.	"No More Fear"
6.	"Dollars or Sense"
7.	"Mother India"

Disc two
No.	Title	Length
8.	"Mr. Bubbleman"
9.	"English Breakfast"
10.	"Bullet Solution?"
11.	"Fartherland"
12.	"New World Order"
13.	"White Gold Burger"
14.	"Back to Basix"
