= Seize the Time =

Seize the Time may refer to:

- Seize the Time (book), a 1970 book by Bobby Seale
- Seize the Time (Fun-Da-Mental album), 1994
- Seize the Time (Flattbush album), 2006
