= Dub Yalil =

Single by Natacha Atlas

from the album Diaspora
- B-side: "Stotinki"
- Released: 1994
- Genre: Electronica, world music
- Length: 5:46
- Label: Nation
- Songwriter: Natacha Atlas
- Producer: Transglobal Underground

Natacha Atlas singles chronology
"Dub Yalil" (1994)	"Leysh Nat' Arak" (1995)

"Dub Yalil" is a world music song performed by Belgian singer Natacha Atlas. The melody and additional lyrics (the words to the "Adhan" - or Islamic call to prayer - are used in the first half of the song) were written by Atlas and produced by Transglobal Underground for the Atlas' debut album Diaspora (1995). It was released as a single in 1994.

== Background and meaning ==
In "Dub Yalil", Atlas professes her love for Allah. The song was written during a period when Atlas was rediscovering her faith in Islam. She began attending the mosque and fasted during the month of Ramadan. "Dub Yalil" features the opening lines of the Adhan, the Muslim call to prayer, over a dub beat. The song begins with her singing "God is greatest, I witness that there is no god but God," but does not complete the prayer's opening line, which should be followed by "and Muhammad is the Messenger of God." Instead, Atlas sings, "God, I love you."

== Formats and track listings ==
These are the formats and track listings of major single releases of "Dub Yalil".

CD single
(NR28CD)

1. "Dub Yalil" (Alternate version) – 6:39
2. "Yalla Chant" (Album version) – 6:01
3. "Stotinki" (The Space Cadets featuring Natacha Atlas and Jah Wobble) – 5:23

Vinyl single
(NR28T)

1. "Dub Yalil" – 5:36
2. "Yalla Chant" – 6:01

== Personnel ==
The following people contributed to "Dub Yalil":

- Natacha Atlas – lead vocals, keyboards
- Aggie Demitri – guitar
- Kevin Haskins – programming, drums, percussion, synthesizer
- Aki Nawaz – samples
- Angus Wallace – engineering
