= Mish Maoul =

Studio album by Natacha Atlas
- Released: April 24, 2006; April 25, 2006 (United States)
- Genre: Electronica, World music
- Label: Mantra Records
- Producer: Temple of Sound, Natacha Atlas, Philip Bagenal, Hamid Belmenouer, Marc Eagleton, Neil Sparkes, Timothy Whelan

Natacha Atlas chronology
| The Best of Natacha Atlas (2005) | Mish Maoul (2006) | Ana Hina (2008) |

Professional ratings
Review scores
| Source | Rating |
|---|---|
| Allmusic | link |
| The Guardian | link |
| Robert Christgau | (2-star Honorable Mention) |

Mish Maoul (Arabic: مش معقول, an expression meaning "unbelievable") is the sixth album by Belgian world music singer Natacha Atlas. It was released by Mantra Recordings on April 24, 2006 worldwide. The album was primarily produced by Nick Page aka Count Dubulah, Atlas' former bandmate in Transglobal Underground.

The album marks a return for Atlas to her Maghrebi musical roots, although she also utilises bossa nova, Western pop, and electronica. In 2006, the album reached number twelve on the Billboard Top World Music Albums chart in the United States.

== Musical style ==
As befits her globe-trotting lifestyle and influences, Atlas continues to create a body of work that refuses to be neatly categorised. Over the past decade, she has fused North African and Arabic music with western electronic beats to produce a unique dance music hybrid. With her latest album Mish Maoul, however, her career comes full circle to touch base with her roots. The new album harks back in its sound and traditions to the music she grew up hearing in the Moroccan suburb of Brussels, particularly when the Golden Sound Studio Orchestra of Cairo makes its entrance. It also reunites her again with the Temple of Sound's Nick Page aka Count Dubulah, with whom she first worked in Transglobal Underground and who helped produce her very first solo album Diaspora (and many subsequent collaborations).

== Track listing ==
1. "Oully Ya Sahbi" featuring Sofiane Saidi (Atlas, Dubulah, Sparkes) – 5:36
2. "Feen" featuring Princess Julianna (Atlas, Dubulah, Higgins, Sparkes) – 5:54
3. "Hayati Inta" (Atlas, Eagleton) – 4:02
4. "Ghanwa Bossanova" (Atlas, Dubulah, Sparkes) – 6:33
5. "Bathaddak" featuring Princess Julianna (Atlas, Higgins, Whelan) – 5:12
6. "Bab el Janna" (Atlas, Dubulah, Sparkes) – 5:46
7. "Wahashni" (Atlas, Dubulah, Sparkes) – 4:46
8. "Haram Aleyk" (Atlas, Sabet, Whelan) – 5:11
9. "La Lil Khowf" featuring Clotaire K & Sofiane Saidi (Atlas, Dubulah, Sparkes, Clotaire K) – 5:32
10. "Yariet" (Atlas, Eagleton) – 3:37

== Charts ==
| Chart (2006) | Peak position |
|---|---|
| US Top World Music Albums (Billboard) | 12 |
