= List of Natacha Atlas collaborations =

The following is a list of collaborations performed by Belgian world music singer Natacha Atlas and other music artists.

== Collaborations ==
Year	Song	Album	Artist(s)
1991	"Blue Moon"	Coming Down	Daniel Ash
1991	"Walk This Way"	Coming Down	Daniel Ash
1991	"Closer to You"	Coming Down	Daniel Ash
1991	"Day Tripper"	Coming Down	Daniel Ash
1991	"This Love"	Coming Down	Daniel Ash
1991	"Blue Angel"	Coming Down	Daniel Ash
1991	"Me and My Shadow"	Coming Down	Daniel Ash
1991	"Not So Fast"	Coming Down	Daniel Ash
1991	"Relight the Flame"	Rising Above Bedlam	Jah Wobble's Invaders of the Heart
1991	"Bomba"	Rising Above Bedlam	Jah Wobble's Invaders of the Heart
1991	"Erzulie"	Rising Above Bedlam	Jah Wobble's Invaders of the Heart
1991	"Soledad"	Rising Above Bedlam	Jah Wobble's Invaders of the Heart
1992	"Bluebird"	Foolish Thing Desire	Daniel Ash
1992	"Firedance"	Foolish Thing Desire	Daniel Ash
1993	"Arranged Marriage"	No Reservations	Apache Indian
1994	"Giza, 1928"	Stargate Soundtrack	David Arnold
1994	"Caravan to Nagada"	Stargate Soundtrack	David Arnold
1994	"When the Storm Comes"	Take Me to God	Jah Wobble and Anneli Drecker
1994	"Penmon"	Circus	Not Drowning, Waving
1994	"Ugly"	Hot Trip to Heaven	Love and Rockets
1994	"Gazal"	Big Heart	Essam Rashad
1995	"Hope"	Migration	Nitin Sawhney
1995	"A Love Song"	Heaven and Earth	Jah Wobble
1995	"Thundergirl Mutation"	The Tooth Mother	Mick Karn
1995	"Lodge of Skins"	The Tooth Mother	Mick Karn
1995	"Feta Funk"	The Tooth Mother	Mick Karn
1996	"Sky and Soul"	Deep Travel	Carlos Maria Trindade
1996	"Habibti"	Mraya	Abdel Ali Slimani
1997	"From Russia with Love"	Shaken and Stirred: The David Arnold James Bond Project	David Arnold
1997	"God is God"	Bible of Dreams	Juno Reactor
1998	"Just a Prayer"	Umbra Sumus	Jah Wobble and Abdel Ali Slimani
1998	"St. Mary-le-Bow"	Umbra Sumus	Jah Wobble and Abdel Ali Slimani
2000	"C'est La Vie"	Métamorphoses	Jean-Michel Jarre
2001	"Habibi"	Groove Alla Turca	Burhan Ocal & The Trakya All Stars
2001	"Gene Gel"	Groove Alla Turca	Burhan Ocal & The Trakya All Stars
2001	"I Can Feel It"	Groove Alla Turca	Burhan Ocal & The Trakya All Stars
2002	"Sanäti"	Sanati	Toires
2002	"Truthful Moods"	The Truth About Charlie Soundtrack	Rachel Portman
2003	"Arabian Nights: Scimitar Moon/Voyage/Promise/Hamesha/Alone"	Harem	Sarah Brightman
2003	"Ajde Jano"	East Meets East	Nigel Kennedy and the Kroke Band
2003	"Prologue"	Hulk: Original Motion Picture Soundtrack	Danny Elfman
2004	"Love Throughout the World"	Where the Fun Starts Early in the Day	Banzai Republic
2004	"Communicate"	Act One	Blend
2004	"Cinema Eden"	Gold of the Sun	Temple of Sound
2004	"Cadiz"	Gold of the Sun	Temple of Sound
2004	"The Broom-field Hill"	Ochre	Andrew Cronshaw
2004	"Sofia, the Saracen's Daughter"	Ochre	Andrew Cronshaw
2005	"Light of Life (Ibelin Reprise)"	Kingdom of Heaven Soundtrack	Harry Gregson-Williams
2005	"La Fille du Vent"	Benjamin Legrand Sings Michel Legrand	Benjamin Legrand
2005	"Discovery at Asselar"	Sahara Soundtrack	Clint Mansell
2005	"Kazim Arrives"	Sahara Soundtrack	Clint Mansell
2005	"Death in the Desert"	Sahara Soundtrack	Clint Mansell
2006	"Tan Lejos, Tan Cerca (Te Vere en Mis Suenos)"	LDA v. the Lunatics	Los De Abajo
2006	"Lover's Embrace"	Tempting the Muse	Mysteria
2007	"Ma Jeunesse Fout Le Camp"	Voila	Belinda Carlisle
2007	"Bonnie et Clyde"	Voila	Belinda Carlisle
2007	"La Vie En Rose"	Voila	Belinda Carlisle
2007	"Des Ronds Dans L'Eau"	Voila	Belinda Carlisle
2008	"Whatever Lola Wants (Lola Gets)"	Whatever Lola Wants Soundtrack	Transglobal Underground
2008	"Kidda Mish Maoul"	Whatever Lola Wants Soundtrack	Transglobal Underground
2008	"Eeh Ya Weleda"	Whatever Lola Wants Soundtrack	Transglobal Underground
2008	"Ena Harda Youm"	Whatever Lola Wants Soundtrack	Transglobal Underground
2008	"Taksim Tango"	Whatever Lola Wants Soundtrack	Transglobal Underground
2011	"Cairo Cairo"	World of Funk	Shawn Lee's Ping Pong Orchestra
2011	"The Mighty Atlas"	World of Funk	Shawn Lee's Ping Pong Orchestra
2015	"Rescue"	Last Knights soundtrack	Satnam Ramgotra and Martin Tillman
2015	"Mirror"	Last Knights soundtrack	Satnam Ramgotra and Martin Tillman
2015	"Devotion"	Last Knights soundtrack	Satnam Ramgotra and Martin Tillman
2015	"Free"	Last Knights soundtrack	Satnam Ramgotra and Martin Tillman
2015	"Naomi"	Last Knights soundtrack	Satnam Ramgotra and Martin Tillman
2015	"Emperor"	Last Knights soundtrack	Satnam Ramgotra and Martin Tillman
2015	"Journey"	Last Knights soundtrack	Satnam Ramgotra and Martin Tillman
2013	"Brass Monkey"	Les Nuits	Samy Bishai
2013	"Ashoufak"	Les Nuits	Samy Bishai
2013	"Camel Driver"	Les Nuits	Samy Bishai
2013	"Blaad"	Les Nuits	Samy Bishai
2013	"Saccade"	Les Nuits	Samy Bishai
2013	"Walk in the Palace Gardens"	Les Nuits	Samy Bishai
2013	"Calibre	Les Nuits	Samy Bishai
2013	"Ghorba"	Les Nuits	Samy Bishai
2013	"Malah's Carpet"	Les Nuits	Samy Bishai
2013	"Amulet Reprise"	Les Nuits	Samy Bishai
2013	"Opium Dream"	Les Nuits	Samy Bishai
2013	"It's A Man's Man's Man's World"	Les Nuits	Samy Bishai
2013	"Rebirth"	Les Nuits	Samy Bishai
2013	"Dark Masmoudi"	Les Nuits	Samy Bishai
2013	"Arabiya"	Les Nuits	Samy Bishai
2013	"Perchance"	Les Nuits	Samy Bishai
2013	"Ghorba - Exile"	Les Nuits	Samy Bishai
2013	"New Massacre"	Les Nuits	Samy Bishai
2013	"Kan Ya Ma Kan - Once Upon a Time"	Les Nuits	Samy Bishai
2014	"Lever du jour"	Naissance	Estelle Goldfarb
2016	"Teardrop - Ya Habibi"	Eros	Paolo Fresu and Omar Sosa
2016	"My Soul, My Spirit"	Eros	Paolo Fresu and Omar Sosa
2016	"Rebirth"	Hits, Vol. 1	Hi-Finesse
2016	"Momenta"	Hits, Vol. 1	Hi-Finesse
2017	"Persia (Vorontsov & Dorohov Remix)"	Imagi-Nation	Art of Trance
2023	"Extacy"	DNA Presents	John Digweed
2023	'"Slip N Slide"	DNA Presents	John Digweed
2024	"Who Are We Now"	Make One Little Room an Everywhere	Tori Freestone
2025	"The House Came Down"	single	Scullion
