= Scalper (musician) =

- Born: 31 October 1967 (age 59)
- Origin: London, England
- Genre: Hip-hop
- Occupations: Rapper, record producer, songwriter
- Years active: 2000-present
- Label: Independent
- Website: www.scalper7.com

Scalper (/skɑːlpɜːr/; born 31 October 1967) is a British, London-bred rapper, producer and songwriter of Pakistani descent, who is now based in Auckland, New Zealand.

== Career ==
=== Early years ===
Appearing as "MC Nad", Scalper started off his musical career performing in the underground hip-hop crew Made In Britain (M.I.B.). Their track 'Break The Crunch' took the group to number five in the Kiss 100FM (UK) Underground Rap charts in 1991.

Later in the decade Scalper worked under the moniker "Nad", as a member of the British-based multi-ethnic hip-hop world fusion music group Fun-Da-Mental, as a live vocalist. The group were well known for their heavily political attitude, strong Islamic affiliation and energetic fusion of Eastern and Western musical forms.

The first solo release under the Scalper name was the self-titled "Scalper' EP, released in 1997 on Flo Records. This was followed by a second Flo Records release titled the '7th Thief' EP in 1998.

Leaving Fun-Da-Mental in 2000 to pursue a solo career, Scalper went on to release a set of EPs under a number of pseudonyms, as well as providing vocal, writing and arrangement work for the likes of Sonic Area (FR), Larvae (USA), Zodiac Project & Trace Elements (CH), Fujako (Belgium) and touring extensively. The third Scalper EP When The Angels Fight was released in 2002 on the Clockwork Recordings record label.

=== 2007 onwards: Move to New Zealand, Flesh & Bones and Butchers Bakers ===
Scalper made the move to New Zealand in 2007, after first visiting with Fun-Da-Mental for the 1997 WOMAD festival.

Basing himself on Auckland City's west coast Scalper began working creatively in his new home, leading to the release of 2010's Flesh & Bones on 8 February. The album, which was distributed by local label Border Music, was very well received by New Zealand press, who labelled it "beautifully formed...finely tuned" and "What could be New Zealand's most polished and accomplished album for 2010" Album opener 'Black Glory' reached number five on the Kiwi FM (NZ) charts soon after the release of Flesh & Bones. In the same year Scalper supported King Kapisi on his nationwide 'Hip Hop Lives Here' tour.

2011 saw Scalper support legendary hip-hop group Public Enemy on the New Zealand leg of their 'Fear of a Black Planet' world tour, performing and opening up for them in both Christchurch and Auckland.

Scalper released his sophomore album Butchers Bakers on 19 March 2012. The album, which was self-released as a digital-only package, saw Scalper take exceeding personal approach to his songwriting, leaning heavily on experiential narratives. This release was also well received, with national newspaper The New Zealand Herald claiming it was "so good, not to mention unique to be coming out of this country, that we should claim him officially as one of our own.” Coming off the release of Butchers Bakers Scalper has now shifted focus to his live performances, following up with shows throughout Auckland as well as Sydney, Australia.

=== Albums ===
- Flesh & Bones - Border Music New Zealand (February 2010)
- Butchers Bakers - Self Released (March 2012) (Digital)
- The Emperor's Clothes - Jarring effects (2015) (CD, Digital, Vinyl)

=== EPs ===
- Scalper - Flo Records (1997) (CD)
- 7th Thief - Flo Records (1998) (CD)
- When The Angels Fight - Clockwork Recordings (2002) (CD, Digital)
- Lunatics EP - JFX Lab (2015) (Digital)
- Trojan Horses/Scalper Cuts Ep - Quixote r.p.m (2016) (Digital)
