= Hustlers HC =

British Asian hip hop group

Hustlers HC was an Asian hip hop group based in West London, England. The group formed in 1991, and consisted of three members: two rappers, The Hustler MC (Paul Arora) and Ski-Man (Mandeep Walia), and DJ Mitts. Hustlers HC were the first Sikh rap crew to come out of the United Kingdom with a strong socio-political message. They did much to bridge religious divides in the Asian community as well as creating much respect for Sikhs in the Rap fraternity. Hustlers HC were also responsible, along with DJ Ritu, for organising and maintaining one of the first and most respected Asian club nights in London, Bombay Jungle at the Wag Club. The trio made their first television appearance on the series Rhythm & Raag in 1992.

== Music ==
Along with Fun-Da-Mental and ADF, Hustlers HC promotes the disruption of racial and ethnic conception of 'blackness' and 'Asianness.' With a combination of Asian instrumentation and lyrics with the "black" genre of Rap, they explain why Asians are into rap, and according to one scholar, "signify a potentiality in the disruption of essentialising racial/ethnic boundary formation and identification, and mark the possibility of a transcendence in the normative representations of both 'blackness' and 'Asianness.'"

The group released two singles through Nation Records: "Big Trouble in Little Asia" / "Let the Hustlers Play" in 1993 and "On a Ride" / "Vigilante" 1994. They are credited with being one of the first Asian hip hop groups. Their music mixes gangsta rap lyrics and stylistics with jazz like beats, which combines to form a unique hip hop sound. The group uses their lyrics to discuss political and social issues pertinent to the Asian community.

In the song "Big Trouble in Little Asia", Hustlers HC intelligently discusses the issues of post-colonial India, racism in Britain, and the richness of Asian culture.

Hustlers HC often blends hip-hop and gangster rap lyrically while allowing the beat to be influenced by a more relaxed and smooth jazz-influenced sound. 'Big Trouble in Little Asia' became one of the first tracks to bring Asian politics and culture to the ears of Britain. "A haunted melodic guitar riff and jazzy Hip-Hop beat carry the listener, and the rising tempo—syncopated by Reggae breaks—increasingly intensifies the message."

On the flip side of 'Big Trouble...' was "Let the Hustlers Play", a more playful "up-front funky hip hop tune with unmistakable Asian flavour combining dope beats with boasting toasting lyrical skills."

In the 1994 release "On a Ride" / "Vigilante", produced and co-written by Simon Underwood, Hustlers HC follows a similar pattern to their first single with a relaxed funky track and an angry political track. "On a Ride" has a fun relaxed beat and is based around a break from the 70's British funk band Hi-Tension. The B-Side, "Vigilante – mind of the confused and angry" "takes on various view points expressed by young Asians as to how to tackle the increasing number of racially motivated attacks vented against their communities."

The music of Hustlers HC contributed to lessening the religious gap in Asian society in addition to giving Sikhs a new-found respect within the rap community. They also assisted the creation of "one of the first and most respected Asian night clubs in London, Bombay Jungle at the Wag Club". In both of their records, Hustlers HC has managed to bridge the gap of the conscious and the playful.

== Discography ==
- "Big Trouble in Little Asia" / "Let the Hustlers Play" (single) – 1993
- "On a Ride" / "Vigilante" (single) – 1994
