= China Drum =

English punk rock band

- Also known as: The Drum
- Origin: Ovingham, Northumberland, England
- Genres: Punk rock, alternative rock
- Years active: 1989–2000, 2013–2014, 2018–present
- Labels: Fluffy Bunny, MCA, Beggars Banquet, Mantra
- Members: Adam Lee; Bill McQueen; Dave McQueen; John Steel; Kate Stephenson
- Past members: Jan Alkema

China Drum are an English punk rock band from Ovingham, Northumberland, active initially from 1989 to 2000, playing under the name The Drum beginning in 1999. The group released three moderately successful full-length albums and toured in support of noted punk and alternative rock groups, including Green Day, Ash, and Supergrass. They reformed in 2013 under the China Drum moniker.

== History ==
=== Early years, Goosefair (1989–1996) ===
China Drum were formed in rural Northern England in 1989 by brothers Bill and Dave McQueen, a guitarist and bassist respectively, and singing drummer Adam Lee. Then teenagers, the members first began rehearsing in a local farm's empty pig shed powered by an electrical generator. After four years of extensive local and regional gigging, the band self-released their debut single, "Simple", in 1993, which was championed by John Peel and other members of the British radio press. The band were also heartened when Frankie Stubbs and his influential punk band Leatherface received the single warmly. Leatherface went on to cover the China Drum B-side "Meaning" on their "Little White God" single the following year.

The "Great Fire" single was issued later in 1994 by the London-based Fluffy Bunny Records imprint before a UK tour with Green Day which also included an Amsterdam date, their first international gig. Green Day remained supporters of the group, and bassist Mike Dirnt can be seen wearing a China Drum t-shirt in the music video for their successful single "When I Come Around". Over the next two years, China Drum released the Barrier EP and numerous smaller releases, many of which received national support from such outlets as BBC Radio One.

The band soon signed with Mantra, a subsidiary of Beggars Banquet Europe and Japan, and MCA Records in the United States, who issued a reworked version of the Barrier EP. They released their debut album, Goosefair, on 29 April 1996. The album peaked at No 53 on the UK Albums Chart and received good critical reception, with AllMusic critic Jack Rabid calling the material a mix of "wild catchy pop and charged rock and roll" and Hybrid Magazine's Tom Topkoff praising the group for its heavy pop prowess. Extensive international touring followed in support of the album, including dates in North America, Bosnia, and Sarajevo, and shared bills with Ash and Supergrass.

Their breakthrough hit came via a high-tempo cover version of Kate Bush's "Wuthering Heights", which received its first wide release as the B-Side to Goosefair's lead single, "Can't Stop These Things". This inaugurated the band's practice of recording punk versions of pop songs: they later recorded Crowded House's "Fall at Your Feet" in a similar vein, and the theme tune to the television programme The Adventures of Rupert Bear also became a fan favourite at concerts.

=== Self Made Maniac, Diskin; breakup (1998–2000) ===
They released their second album, Self Made Maniac on 24 April 1997, via the Beggars Banquet imprint the following year. The album received mixed critical reception: while The Washington Post critic Mark Jenkins praised the record's balance of classic British rock and modern punk, Dean Carlson noted via AllMusic that the band's sound had "ripened" but now lacked "fervor and melody". In 1998 the group added former Compulsion drummer Jan Alkema to their live lineup, freeing Lee to act exclusively as lead vocalist during concerts.

The group promoted Alkema to full-time member status and renamed themselves The Drum in 1999, while also introducing elements of alternative rock and electronic music into their new sound. They released the Diskin album via Mantra Records in this incarnation the following year. Diskin's change of musical direction polarized fans and received lukewarm critical reviews, with NME noting the uneven results of the experimentation and awarding the album five out of ten stars. After being dropped by Mantra and embarking upon a poorly received tour in support of Suicidal Tendencies, The Drum ultimately disbanded in September 2000 due to financial and personal considerations.

The McQueen brothers later played together in Servo, while Alkema formed Driven to Collision and Lee the indie rock group Sickhoose. Following their breakup, China Drum retained a cult following and continued to influence other bands: the Australian group Bodyjar, for example, covered "Fall Into Place" on their 2001 album You Got Me a Girl's Bike You Idiot.

=== Reunion (2013–present) ===
In 2013 the band reformed with a line up including Lee, the McQueen brothers, and new members John Steel on guitar and Kate Stephenson on drums. Returning to the China Drum moniker and focusing mostly on early material, they played their first gig after reuniting at The Garage in London on 21 February with support by Midway Still and Vanilla Pod. Further concerts followed thereafter, starting with Newcastle University Students' Union on 10 May and a subsequent tour of the United Kingdom. The band released the "Water" single in October 2014. They played dates without Bill McQueen in 2014, and entered a hiatus thereafter. They resumed playing live in March 2018.

In 2024, Bill McQueen returned to the band, and he and Adam Lee performed a number of acoustic shows in the North East of England. The band then had the opportunity to play several intimate shows around Tokyo, Japan, named Japan Tour of Mintness 2024. It was the first time the band had performed full shows for some years; due to short notice, Dave McQueen, John Steel and Kate Stephenson were not available for the Japanese dates, so the tour lineup featured Lee and Bill McQueen along with touring members Kev Watson (bass) and Damian Harris (drums). In 2025 they announced further shows, rejoined by Dave McQueen on bass, while Harris reprised his role on drums as Stephenson had to step back due to family health issues.

== Members ==
=== Current ===
- Adam Lee – vocals (1989–2000, 2013–2014, 2018–present), drums (1989–1999)
- Bill McQueen – guitar, backing vocals (1989–2000, 2013–2014, 2024-present)
- Dave McQueen – bass, backing vocals (1989–2000, 2013–2014, 2018–present)
- John Steel – guitar, backing vocals (2013–2014, 2018–present)
- Kate Stephenson – drums (2013–2014, 2018–present)

=== Former ===
- Jan Alkema – drums (1999–2000)

=== Touring ===
- Jan Alkema - drums (1998-99) (became full member in 1999)
- Kev Watson - bass (2024)
- Damian Harris - drums (2024-5)

== Discography ==
=== Albums ===
- Goosefair (1996) – UK No. 53
- Self Made Maniac (1997)
- Diskin (2000) – as The Drum

=== Singles and EPs ===
- "Simple" (1993, Bitzcore)
- "Great Fire" (1994, Fluffy Bunny)
- Barrier EP (1995, Fluffy Bunny)
- China Drum / The Flying Medallions split 7-inch (1995, Fierce Panda) – tour giveaway featuring "Wuthering Heights" and "Cloud 9"
- "Fall Into Place" (1995, Mantra)
- "Enter at Your Own Risk" (1995, Mantra)
- "Enter at Your Own Risk Again" (1995, Mantra)
- "Pictures" (1995, Mantra)
- Barrier EP (US version) (1995, 510 Records)
- Rolling Hills and Soaking Gills EP (US & European compilation)
- "Can't Stop These Things" (1996, Mantra) – UK No. 65
- "Last Chance" (1996, Mantra) – UK No. 60
- "Wipeout" (1996, Mantra)
- "Fiction of Life" (1997, Mantra) – UK No. 65
- "Somewhere Else" (1997, Mantra) – UK No. 74
- "Stop It All Adding Up" (1998, Mantra)
- "Horns Front" (2000, Mantra) – as The Drum
- Reasons EP (2000, Mantra) – as The Drum
- "Water" (2014, Too Pure)

=== Compilation appearances ===
- Snakebite City 3 (Bluefire Records – features electric version of "Meaning")
- Best Punk Rock in England Son – Snuffy Smiles (Japanese compilation featuring different version of "Cloud 9")
- Built to Blast EP (1994) – Fierce Panda (featured "One Way Down")
- Alternator (Dino Entertainment; features "Wipe Out")
- Vans Warped Tour 96 (features "Can't Stop These Things")
- Masterminds OST (features "Biscuit Barrel")
