= Bastet (disambiguation) =

Bastet is a cat goddess of ancient Egypt.

Bastet may also refer to:

- "Bastet" (song) by Belgian singer Natacha Atlas
- Bastet, a character on the TV-series Stargate
- Bastet (mascot), the official Mascot of the 11th Pan Arab Games
- Bastet, a character from PJ Masks: Power Heroes
- Bastet, a fictional race of werecats in White Wolf's World of Darkness role-playing game
