= Le goût du pain =

Single by Natacha Atlas

from the album Ayeshteni
- Released: 2001
- Genre: Electronica, World Music
- Length: 3:37
- Label: Mantra, Labels
- Songwriters: Didier Golemanas, Kamel El Habchi
- Producers: Kamel El Habchi, Transglobal Underground

Natacha Atlas singles chronology
"Mish Fadilak" (2001)	"Le goût du pain" (2001)	"Quand je ferme les yeux" (2003)

"Le goût du pain" is a world music song performed by Belgian singer Natacha Atlas. It was written by Didier Golemanas and Kamel El Habchi, and produced by El Habchi and Transglobal Underground. The song appears on the French version of Atlas' album Ayeshteni (2001). In 2001, the track was released as a promotional single in France to promote Atlas' performance at the Paris Olympia on 2 November.

== Formats and track listings ==
These are the formats and track listings of major single releases of "Le Goût Du Pain".

CD single
(VISA #6671)

1. "Le goût du pain" (Radio edit)

== Personnel ==
The following people contributed to "Le Goût du Pain":

- Natacha Atlas – lead vocals
- Kamel El Habchi, Transglobal Underground – production
- André Manoukian – mixing
