= Duden (song) =

Single by Natacha Atlas

from the album Diaspora
- Released: 1995
- Genre: Electronica, World Music
- Length: 6:41
- Label: Nation
- Songwriter(s): Natacha Atlas, Count Dubulah, Hamid ManTu, Attiah Ahlan
- Producer(s): Transglobal Underground

Natacha Atlas singles chronology
| "Leysh Nat' Arak" (1995) | "Duden" (1995) | "Yalla Chant" (1995) |

"Duden" is a world music song performed by Belgian singer Natacha Atlas. The song was written by Natacha Atlas, Count Dubulah, Hamid ManTu and Attiah Ahlan and produced by Transglobal Underground for the Atlas' debut album Diaspora (1995). It was released as a promotional single in 1995.

== Formats and track listings ==
These are the formats and track listings of major single releases of "Duden".

CD single
(ATLAS #1 CD)

1. "Duden" (Spooky's Day Trip to Sousse) – 6:52
2. "Duden" (The Indian Jungle Book mix) – 6:10
3. "Duden" – 6:41
