= L'Égyptienne (song) =

Single by Natacha Atlas featuring Les Négresses Vertes

from the album Halim
- Released: 1998
- Genre: Electronica, World Music
- Length: 3:28
- Label: Nation
- Songwriter(s): Natacha Atlas, Matthias Canavese, Stéfane Mellino, Michel Ochowiak
- Producer(s): Les Négresses Vertes

Natacha Atlas singles chronology
"Amulet" (1997)	"L'Égyptienne" (1998)	"Mon Amie La Rose" (1999)

"L'Égyptienne" is a world music song performed by Belgian singer Natacha Atlas and French group Les Négresses Vertes. The song was written by Atlas, Matthias Canavese, Stéfane Mellino and Michel Ochowiak and produced by Les Négresses Vertes for the Atlas' second album Halim (1997). It was released as a single in 1998.

== Formats and track listings ==
These are the formats and track listings of major single releases of "L'Égyptienne".

CD single

1. "L'Égyptienne" (Radio Edit) – 3:28
2. "L'Égyptienne" (Alternative Frantic Funk radio edit) – 3:39

Promotional CD single

1. "L'Égyptienne" (Radio Edit) – 3:28
2. "L'Égyptienne" (Album Version) – 3:59

12-inch single

1. "L'Égyptienne" (Alternative Frantic Funk instrumental) – 4:58
2. "L'Égyptienne" (Alternative Frantic Funk mix) – 4:58
3. "L'Égyptienne" (JR Hypno Funk instrumental) – 4:53
4. "L'Égyptienne" (JR Hypno Funk vocal) – 4:53

== Personnel ==
The following people contributed to "L'Égyptienne":

- Natacha Atlas – lead vocals
- Les Négresses Vertes – production
- Alf – engineering
- Frank L – artwork
