= Ana Hina =

Studio album by Natacha Atlas
- Released: 26 May 2008
- Genre: World music
- Label: World Village
- Producer: Harvey Brough Recording Engineer=Alejandro Merola

Natacha Atlas chronology
Mish Maoul (2006)	Ana Hina (2008)	Mounqaliba (2010)

Ana Hina (Arabic: أنا هنا, English: I'm Here) is an album by Belgian singer Natacha Atlas. It was released by World Village on 26 May 2008. The album primarily features acoustic cover versions of songs originally performed by Arabic singers Fairuz and Abdel Halim Hafez. It was also influenced by Scottish and Latin music. The song "He Hesitated" appeared in the 2009 film Amreeka.

== Songs and background ==
Many of the songs on the album were culled from her father's personal tape collection by Atlas's music director, Harvey Brough. The lyrics to "La Vida Callada", a duet with Spanish singer Clara Sanabras, are based on a poem composed by the Mexican artist Frida Kahlo. "Black is the Colour" is a traditional Scottish folk song. Atlas' version is loosely based on Nina Simone's cover version and features a Middle Eastern musical arrangement. The song "He Hesitated" refers to the Iraq War; Atlas has openly criticized the foreign policy decisions of former United States President George W. Bush and former British Prime Minister Tony Blair. The track "El Nowm" was inspired by Lebanese composer Zad Moultaka's album Anashid.

== Critical response ==
Professional ratings
Review scores
Source	Rating
The Guardian	4/5 stars
The National	5/5 stars
The Times	4/5 stars

Ana Hina received positive reviews from music critics. In a review for The Guardian, Robin Denselow called the album a "mature, varied and entertaining set". The Times reviewer David Hutcheon described Ana Hina as "rather wonderful" and named "La Vida Callada" as its best song. Youssef Rakha of The National wrote that the album "is a powerful statement about being in the world today, a musical monument to globalisation" and further commented that its "effect is both refreshing and disorienting".

== Track listing ==
#	Title	Songwriters	Length
1	"Ya Laure Hobouki"	Rahbani Brothers	4:22
2	"Beny Ou Benak Eih"	Mamoun AlShinnawy, Kamal AlTaweel	4:12
3	"Ana Hina"	Natacha Atlas, Harvey Brough	5:12
4	"La Shou El Haki"	Rahbani Brothers	3:18
5	"Black is the Colour"	John Jacob Niles	4:07
6	"Le Teetab Alayi"	Rahbani Brothers	3:20
7	"La Vida Callada" with Clara Sanabras	Frida Kahlo, Clara Sanabras	5:04
8	"Hayati Inta Reprise (Hayatak Ana)"	Atlas, Brough, Marc Eagleton	6:26
9	"El Asil"	Emam ElSaftalli, Aly Ismael	2:03
10	"Lammebada"	Traditional	7:10
11	"He Hesitated"	Atlas, Brough, Eagleton	4:19
12	"El Nowm"	Atlas, Brough	5:45

== Charts ==
Chart (2008)	Peak position
French Albums Chart	162
