= Halim (album) =

Studio album by Natacha Atlas
- Released: 12 May 1997
- Genre: Electronic, world music
- Label: Nation Records
- Producer: John Reynolds, Transglobal Underground, Jaz Coleman, Essam Rashad, Natacha Atlas, Aki Nawaz

Natacha Atlas chronology
Diaspora (1995)	Halim (1997)	Gedida (1999)

Singles from Halim
- 1. "Amulet" Released: 1997; 2. "L'Égyptienne" Released: 1998

Professional ratings
Review scores
Source	Rating
AllMusic	2.5/5 stars
Robert Christgau	(dud)
NME	7/10

Halim (Arabic: حليم) is the second solo album by the Belgian world music singer Natacha Atlas. It was released by Nation Records in 1997. The album was primarily produced by Transglobal Underground and John Reynolds.

The album is dedicated to Egyptian singer Abdel Halim Hafez, whose "music meant everything" to her.

== Critical reception ==
AllMusic wrote that Atlas "continues in her vein of excellent Arabic singing combined with a wide variety of musical traditions, modern and ancient."

== Track listing ==
All tracks written and composed by Natacha Atlas, Count Dubulah, Hamid ManTu and Alex Kasiek, except where stated.

1. "Marifnaash" (Atlas, John Reynolds, Justin Adams) – 4:49
2. "Moustahil" – 3:33
3. "Amulet" – 4:59
4. "Leyli" – 3:42
5. "Kidda" (Atlas, Reynolds, Adams) – 5:10
6. "Sweeter Than Any Sweets" – 6:00
7. "Ya Weledi" – 7:10
8. "Enogoom Wil, Amar" (Atlas) – 6:45
9. "Andeel" (Atlas) – 5:56
10. "Gafsa" (Atlas, Reynolds, Adams) – 6:37
11. "Ya Albi Ehda" (Atlas, Essam Rashad) – 9:00
12. "Agib" (Atlas, Reynolds, Adams) – 7:34

=== Bonus tracks ===
All bonus tracks appear on the special edition Halim.

13. "L'Égyptienne" featuring Les Négresses Vertes (Atlas, Matthias Canavese, Stéfane Mellino, Michel Ochowiak) – 3:28
14. "Duden" (Spooky remix) (Atlas, Dubulah, ManTu, Ahlan) – 6:59

== Personnel ==
The following people contributed to Halim:

- Natacha Atlas – vocals
- Sawt El Atlas – backing vocals
- Carol Isaacs – accordion
- Count Dubulah – bass, guitar, programming, string arrangements
- John Reynolds – drums, bass, keyboards
- Hamid Mantu – drums, dulcimer, programming
- Tim Garsaayid – dharabuka, riq, ney
- Jaz Coleman – keyboards
- Nick Walker – programming
- Caroline Dale – cello, string arrangements
- Rony Barak – dharabuka, riqq, daf
- Justin Adams – guitar
- Alex Kasiek – keyboards, lute, backing vocals, programming, string arrangements
- Lazarus Whelan – keyboards, saxophone, ney, clarinet
- Keith Clouston – oud
- Simon Walker – violin, viola
- Ahmed Mansour, Nawazish Khan, Wa'el Abubakr, Aboud Abdel Al – violin
- Arabella Rodriquez, David White, Ott, Zakaria, Konstantine – engineering

== Charts ==
Chart (1997)	Peak position
UK Albums Chart	128
