= Diaspora (Natacha Atlas album) =

Studio album by Natacha Atlas
- Released: February 28, 1995
- Genre: Electronic
- Labels: Nation, MCA
- Producer: Transglobal Underground

Natacha Atlas chronology
Diaspora (1995)	Halim (1997)

Singles from Diaspora
- 1. "Dub Yalil" Released: 1994; 2. "Leysh Nat' Arak" Released: 1995; 3. "Duden" Released: 1995 (promotional); 4. "Yalla Chant" Released: 1995

Diaspora is the debut album by Belgian singer Natacha Atlas. It was released by Nation Records in March 1995.

== Critical reception ==
Professional ratings
Review scores
Source	Rating
AllMusic	3/5 stars

The Independent wrote: "It comes closest to the [Transglobal Underground] crossover groove on a track like 'Yalla', where the exotic musical blend is strapped to a sluggish house beat, providing a fascinating contrast between the rigidity of the rhythmic pulse and the flexibility of Atlas's voice."

== Track listing ==
All tracks written and composed by Natacha Atlas, Count Dubulah, Hamid ManTu and Attiah Ahlan, except where noted.

1. "Iskanderia" – 5:15
2. "Leysh Nat' Arak" – 6:07
3. "Diaspora" (Atlas, Dubulah, ManTu, Ahlan, Neil Sparkes) – 6:47
4. "Yalla Chant" – 5:53
5. "Alhambra Part 1" (Atlas, Dubulah, ManTu, Ahlan, Larry Whelan) – 1:20
6. "Duden" – 6:41
7. "Feres" (Atlas, Essam Rashad) – 7:38
8. "Fun Does Not Exist" – 5:56
9. "Dub Yalil" (Atlas) – 7:56
10. "Iskanderia" (Atlas Zamalek) – 5:15
11. "Diaspora" (Ballon Theatre mix) – 7:02
12. "Fun Does Not Exist" (Dolmus mix) – 6:21

=== Bonus tracks ===
All bonus tracks appear on the Japanese edition of Diaspora.

13. "Coulishi" – 5:08
14. "Duden" (Day Trip to Sousse mix) – 7:00
15. "Duden" (Indian Jungle Book mix) – 6:11

== Personnel ==
The following people contributed to Diaspora:

- Natacha Atlas – lead vocals, dharabuka
- Larry Whelan – saxophone, clarinet
- Essam Rashad – oud, violin
- Rafiq Rouissi – dharabuka, riq, percussion
- Neil Sparkes – dharabuka, backing vocals
- Walid Rouissi – backing vocals, oud
- Peer Khawam – keyboard
- Alex Kasiek – keyboards, guitar
- Hamed Mostafa – bass
- Ashiqali Hussein, Ali Ahmedaly, Satin Singh – tabla
- Hamid Mantu – drums, percussion, keyboards
- Nawazish Khan, Amin Abdelazeem, Faed Abdelaal, Hanafi Soliman, Monir Abdelaal, Wael Abubakr – violin
- Count Dubulah – bass, guitar
- Sokar Al Gohari – accordion
- Mostafa Alarab – percussion
- Bashir Abdelall – flute
- Sameer Benjaman – tambourine
- Simon Walker – strings
- Graeme Holdaway – engineering
- Mary Farbrother – photography

== Charts ==
Chart (1995)	Peak position
Dutch Albums Chart	66
UK Albums Chart	123
