= 007: Road to a Million =

2023 television game show

- Genre: Reality competition; Spy fiction
- Inspired by: James Bond by Ian Fleming
- Directed by: Julian Jones; Tom Dumican; Jamie Goold; Alice Smith
- Presented by: Brian Cox
- Theme music composer: Monty Norman, arranged by David Arnold
- Composer: Sam Thompson
- Country of origin: United Kingdom
- Original language: English
- No. of series: 2
- No. of episodes: 16

Production
- Executive producers: Dominic Bird; David Glover; Barry Poznick; Gregg Wilson; Barbara Broccoli; Michael G. Wilson
- Producer: Ben Allen
- Cinematography: Ben Margitich; Peter Allibone; Duane McClunie; Gary Clarke; Richard Ing; Arthur Mulhern
- Editors: Chris Nicholls; Wesley Thomas
- Camera setup: Multi-camera
- Running time: 39–60 minutes
- Production companies: 72 Films; MGM Television; Eon Productions; Amazon Studios

Original release
- Network: Amazon Prime Video
- Release: 10 November 2023 – present

007: Road to a Million is a reality competition show spin-off of the James Bond franchise. Hosted by Brian Cox, it features teams of two competing in a race to win £1 million each through a series of spy-themed challenges. The series was made by 72 Films and MGM Television in association with Eon Productions for release on Amazon Prime Video on 10 November 2023.

On 13 September 2023, it was announced that the show was renewed for a second series before the first series was even released on the service. The 8-part second series released onto Prime Video on 22 August 2025, but with a new format, and eight teams instead of nine participating.

== Format ==
Brian Cox hosts the show as the "Controller", and nine teams of two people compete to win a worldwide race to win £1 million each. The Controller sets the rules of the game, back at "MI6" and monitoring each team from afar as he tells them where they must go next, what challenges they must perform, and what questions they must try to answer. Cox portrays the Controller as a hard but fair 'M' style character, equally delighting in the hardship of the contestants and impressed by their performance. The tasks and locations are linked to various Bond films and actual and replica props are used throughout the show. Due to none of the teams reaching the final destination of the first season, the second season of the show changed the format drastically, with the teams all competing for the same £1 million prize and a guarantee that the final destination would be reached by one team. It introduced a Deputy Controller called Sofia, played by British actress Frances McNamee. In episodes 2,3,5 and 6, the two bottom teams had to face a 'Killer Question' challenge whereby the winning pair will win and the losing pair will be eliminated. In episode 4, the fate of the team to be eliminated was determined by the other teams whilst in episode 7, as there were only 3 teams left, the slowest team was eliminated.

== Production ==
The show had been in development at 72 Films for about four years before Amazon Prime Video green-lit the series in March 2022. By April, Brian Cox had signed on to host as the villain of the show, initially believing that the casting was for the next Bond film.

== Episodes ==
Series	Episodes	Originally released	
Series	Episodes	First released	Last released
1	8	9 November 2023	9 November 2023
2	8	22 August 2025	22 August 2025

=== Series 1 (2023) ===
No. overall	No. in series	Title	Original release date
1	1	"EPISODE ONE"	9 November 2023
Nine teams of two compete for the chance of £1,000,000 by completing tasks and answers the questions set by the controller. Starting in the Scottish Highlands then on to Venice.
2	2	"EPISODE TWO"	9 November 2023
The teams move to Italy.
3	3	"EPISODE THREE"	9 November 2023
One team travels into the Amazon rainforest.
4	4	"EPISODE FOUR"	9 November 2023
One team travels into the Atacama Desert in Chile.
5	5	"EPISODE FIVE"	9 November 2023
This Episode teams are in Venice, Istanbul, Chile and Jamaica.
6	6	"EPISODE SIX"	9 November 2023
One team jumps a train in the desert while another needs to retrieve the next question from a crocodile.
7	7	"EPISODE SEVEN"	9 November 2023
Teams move from the Chilean desert to the Goldeneye estate in Jamaica
8	8	"EPISODE EIGHT"	9 November 2023
Level 5: SwitzerLand - The final three teams are dropped by helicopter into the Swiss Alps and are directed to their next location. The teams need to shoot their way to the next question, Beth and Jenn make it to a barn where they use a precision laser rifle to shoot five targets within three minutes and receive a key. They are directed to another barn and find an Aston Martin DB5 with 007 enhancements and a briefcase they cannot open. They find directions to Grindelwald in the car and drive off. They then get directions to Jungfraujoch via cable car Jungfraubahn rack railway through the mountain. While on the train they are directed to get off at Stollenloch where they put on harnesses and exit the tunnel to the north face of the Eiger. The Bone brothers are directed to a frozen lake and need to shoot five bottles of Bollinger in three minutes, they only manage two targets in the time and the case explodes and so they are eliminated. Jenn descends down the face of the Eiger to retrieve a map. Kamara and Josh follow they directions to a cliff face with the suitcase attached to the rock by five chains, they manage to shoot three targets before time limit but the case explodes and they are eliminated. Beth and Jenn follow their map to the Jungfraujoch radio relay station where they find items of 007 memorabilia and are informed by the Controller they are three questions away from the £1,000,000. They proceed outside and remove a case frozen in the ice and a key for the briefcase they have been carrying which they find contains £500,000 in gold and are presented with a question to win the gold. They get the question wrong and are eliminated. We see the last three teams retrieve their winnings in cash from a bank of lockers, Kamara and Josh and The Bone Brothers leave via train while Jenn and Beth leave in the DB5.

=== Series 2 (2025) ===
No. overall	No. in series	Title	Original release date
9	1	"Mission 1: Thailand"	22 August 2025
Eight teams of two compete for the chance of £1,000,000 by completing tasks and answering questions set by the controller. In the opening Sequence 4 of the Teams are seen at Luzzone dam in Switzerland where one team member must make a bungee jump off the dam wall in a reference to the iconic bungee jump sequence in the opening of 1995 James Bond film GoldenEye. Sid, Dan, Asaad and Alex make the jump for their teams. Also as part of the opening sequence we see all the teams except Sam and Luke driving Aston Martin DB12s on a closed road in Switzerland. We see teams participating in an interview process in a scene taken out of Skyfall, where Daniel Craig as James Bond receives his psychological evaluation with a word association exercise. For £25,000 half the teams were directed to find "Goodnight" in Laem Sai, Thailand in an episode which was inspired by the 1974 James Bond film The Man with the Golden Gun which was mostly set in Thailand. "Goodnight" is the name of the boat that will take them to Scaramanga's Junk where they have to retrieve a hard-drive and SD card from fish tanks containing Scorpions. Ricky and Nobby are fastest followed by Asaad and Jamilah, Cat and Maiya with Sid and Shabina finishing last and facing elimination.
10	2	"Mission 1: Thailand Continued"	22 August 2025
The remaining teams are directed to Sinn Sathorn tower in Bangkok (which was featured in the 1997 James Bond film Tomorrow Never Dies) where they must find the derelict offices of the Carver Media Group Network and search them for instructions on reconnecting a radio tower on the roof to transmit information back to the controller. The teams have to scale a radio tower and solve a cryptic puzzle involving a mix of Thai letters and numbers on the top of the radio tower on the roof of the Sinn Sathorn skyscraper whilst hanging 45 storeys (approximately 200 meters) above street level in a task deliberately engineered to freak out those with a fear of heights. Sam and Luke finish first, followed by Alex and Rob, Dan and Dylan with Steven and Shelley last. As the slowest team from this episode Steven and Shelly compete with Sid and Shabina from the first episode face off for elimination where they have to watch a demonstration of Muay Thai in a derelict stadium in Bangkok and they must correctly identify a Muay Thai move. Sid and Shabina answer incorrectly and are eliminated.
11	3	"Mission 2: Austria"	22 August 2025
As the Fastest team from Thailand Ricky and Noddy are rewarded with a drive in an Aston Martin DB5 with 007 enhancements. The teams are split again with Ricky and Noddy, Asaad and Jamilah and Cat and Maiya facing a walk along cable car wires or a long climb down a ladder to then load balls into a machine requiring teamwork and coordination for £50,000. Jamilah and Asaad complete the mission successfully whilst the other teams fail and so they choose Ricky and Noddy to face elimination. In Vienna the remaining teams are directed to Prater Park, which was one of the iconic locations featured in the 1987 James Bond film The Living Daylights. The teams were instructed to look for "Sniper" which is a shooting theme park booth; the teams need to shoot the bullseye to receive their next clue hidden in a yellow elephant stuffed animal which directs them to the Gesengte Sau roller coaster, the team needs to split up with one team member on the coaster looking for a device and the other controlling the roller coaster. Once the team member riding the roller coaster correctly identifies the position of the bomb device, both team members work to remove a cylinder without touching the sides. Alex and Rob were the only team to have successfully completed the mission whilst all the other teams ran out of time in this mission, Alex and Rob then selected Sam and Luke for elimination. Sam and Luke and Ricky and Noddy face each other at the Ferris Wheel in Vienna and compete in a game of bluff with Ricky and Noddy winning and Sam and Luke being eliminated. The episode ends with Ricky & Noddy being kidnapped as they leave Prater Park.
12	4	"Mission 3: Location Classified"	22 August 2025
The remaining six teams navigate a maze to gather intelligence on each other. Ricky, Dylan, Alex, Maiya, Shelley and Jamilah are tied in the basement, their partners are locked in the cells with rats, tarantulas and snakes. The basement team members need to untie themselves and then they have choice of attempting to rescue their partner first or try to access the vault containing intelligence without them. The vault has time limit of 15 minutes before the information inside self-destructs. Ricky rescues Noddy and they access the vault, Maiya accesses it on her own while Jamilah rescues Asaad and also access the vault. Once the vault is blown the teams then have 30 minutes to find further intel in other rooms. The photo room is protected by a laser grid which locks the door if it is broken a certain number of times. They can access a computer room with files on a computer once they identify the password and another room accessed with video interviews using a special watch. Jamilah and Asaad, Cat and Maiya manage and access the photo room. Ricky and Noddy, Alex and Rob, Dylan and Dan access the computers. Cat. and Maiya, Jamilah and Asaad, Dylan and Dan, Steve and Shelley access the video room. The teams then answer 20 questions to answer on the other teams for £75,000. Ricky and Noddy win with 17 correct answers, then Jamilah and Asaad with 15 followed by Cat and Maiya with 13, finally Alex and Rob with 11 correct. The top four teams then have to choose which of the bottom two teams is to be saved. Three teams chose to save Dan and Dylan while only Alex and Rob choose Steve and Shelley who are then eliminated. In a break from the other episodes which have featured iconic locations from famous James Bond films, this episode doesn't actually directly reference any location from any James Bond film but features more on the teams and their relationships. The filming location was a building in central London near Tower Bridge.
13	5	"Mission 4: Mexico"	22 August 2025
The last five teams arrive at Hacienda San Antonio Ometusco in Mexico (located near the town of Pachuca in Hidalgo state) where they take turns shooting a replica flint lock dueling pistol at a shot glass of whiskey in a scene reminiscent of the 2012 James Bond film Skyfall. Cat and Maiya, Alex and Rob and Dan and Dylan make the shot successfully and win £100,000. The remaining two teams who failed in this mission are Ricky and Noddy and Jamilah and Asaad, they head to the Otomi Ceremonial Centre which was a location featured in the 1989 James Bond film Licence to Kill, which was used as a location in Licence to Kill, there they race around the site in pick-ups driven by stunt drivers, they answer questions on a tablet as they are driven and a correct answer will put that team ahead of the other in the race. Ricky and Noddy answer more correct and stay in the game while Jamilah and Asaad are eliminated. A Mexican air force helicopter comes to pick Ricky and Noddy.
14	6	"Mission 5: Day of the Dead"	22 August 2025
The remaining four teams are sent to Mexico City City during the Day of the Dead parade which was popularised by the opening scene of the 2015 James Bond film Spectre. As the winners of the last mission Cat and Maiya are able to select which team they want to work with, they choose Ricky and Noddy which forces Dan and Dylan and Alex and Rob to work together. One member of each team is handcuffed to the same briefcase, which is carrying £500,000. Their teammates stay in the base in central Mexico City and need to find the clues in the room to direct their people on the ground to find the key to the briefcase. The first clue is on a float in the parade and the second in a skip bin in an alleyway for Cat and Ricky and under van in a carpark for Rob and Dylan. The final clue directs them to Teatro Fru Fru which is a location from Spectre. Ricky and Cat arrive first and retrieve the key which forces the two losing teams to go to Bar La Faena for the Killer Question face off. The teams have to watch a Mexican musical performance about the legend of La Llorona and answer a question about it what the legend is warning children about the dangers of - the correct answer is the dangers of drowning. As Alex speaks Spanish fluently, Rob and Alex answer correctly, successfully banking £250,000 and earning passage to the next round whilst Dan and Dylan are eliminated.
15	7	"Mission 6: Bahamas"	22 August 2025
The final three teams are taken by Bahamian defence force vessel to a submerged wreck in the Bahamas, to the south of the island of New Providence. Whilst various James Bond films like Thunderball, Never Say Never Again and Casino Royale have been set in the Bahamas, there is no direct reference to any scene or location from any of these Bond films in this episode. The teams dive to the wreck and need to identify the correct box to retrieve amongst the decoys then use a lift bag to float it to the surface. Alex and Rob select a decoy and have to go back down and retrieve the correct box. Once they have the correct box the teams need to swim to the beach and answer questions about the task before they run out of time. Ricky and Nobby answer three of four questions correctly, Cat and Maiya answer one of three right while Alex and Rob run out of time and are eliminated.
16	8	"The Final Mission: London"	22 August 2025
Cat and Maiya and Ricky and Noddy face off at the Vesper club in the Bahamas featured in the 2006 James Bond film Casino Royale in a game of bluff. Cat and Maiya lose the challenge, leaving the process with £250,000 of prize money. Ricky and Noddy receive £500,000 as a result and move to London to compete for the £1,000,000 where they are separated and presented with various objects from their travels and asked to pick the one that represent the single most important moment of their adventure for both of them. Unfortunately they both chose different items and so miss out on the grand prize of £1,000,000.

== Reception ==
Joel Golby at The Guardian enjoyed the series, saying that even though it may not make sense on paper, it is "mega-fun" and Cox chewed up the scenes in his portrayal of a Bond villain, holding the series together.

Lucy Mangan, also at The Guardian, gave the series a strongly negative review, calling it "shoddy, boring and soulless," and criticised its use of the Bond brand as "tenuous."

== See also ==
- The Amazing Race (franchise)
