= Sawt el Atlas =

Sawt el Atlas (Arabic: صوت الأطلس, lit. 'Voice of the Atlas') is a French-Moroccan ten-piece band based in Paris. Their music combines many styles, including Arabic, raï, reggae, funk, and Latin rhythms. The group features two sets of three brothers (the Mirghani and El Habchi brothers) and is fronted by tenors Kamel el Habchi and Mounir Mirghani. The band first came together in the late 1980s in the city of Blois when most of its members were teenagers or even younger. Soon they began touring through Europe, opening for the likes of Khaled, Cheb Mami, Youssou N'Dour, and Natacha Atlas. 1996 saw the release of their debut recording, Généraliser. Their sophomore effort, Donia, recorded equally in Paris and Cairo, was issued three years later. Love is the central topic of most of their songs, which feature lyrics in both Arabic and French.

== Members ==
- Kamel El Habchi (vocals)
- Mounir Mirghani (vocals)
- Abdelkrim El Habchi (keyboards)
- Adhil Mirghani (darbouki)
- Khalid El Habchi (drums)
- Samir Mirghani (congas, percussion)

== Discography ==
=== Studio albums ===
- Généraliser (1996, Rue Bleue)
- Donia (2001, Tinder Records)

=== Compilations ===
- Africa - Tea In Marrakech ["Zmane y Dore (Times Change)"]
- Arabic Groove (Putumayo Presents) ["Ne Me Jugez Pas (Volodia Remix)"]
- Mega Rai V.2 (4 cd) ("Bladi")
- Spirit of Rai ("Zmane")
- World, Vol. 1 ["Ne Me Jugez Pas (Si Je l'Aime Autant)"]
