= Ayeshteni =

Studio album by Natacha Atlas
- Released: 8 May 2001
- Genre: Electronica, World music
- Label: Mantra
- Producer: Transglobal Underground, Mika Sabet, Kamel El Habchi, Fahd, Essam Rashad

Natacha Atlas chronology
The Remix Collection (2000)	Ayeshteni (2001)	Foretold in the Language of Dreams (2002)

Alternative cover
- French edition cover

Professional ratings
Review scores
Source	Rating
Allmusic	4.5/5 stars
Pitchfork Media	(7.8/10)
PopMatters	positive

Ayeshteni (Arabic: عيشتني) is the fourth album by Belgian singer Natacha Atlas. It was released by Mantra Records on May 8, 2001. The album received extensive play on college radio and sold around 15,000 copies in its first two years of release.

== Track listing ==
All tracks written and composed by Natacha Atlas, except where noted.

1. "Shubra" (Alex Kasiek, Hamid ManTu, Atlas) - 5:40
2. "I Put a Spell on You" (Screamin' Jay Hawkins) - 3:39
3. "Ashwa" - 6:00
4. "Ayeshteni" (Atlas, Mika Sabet) - 4:54
5. "Soleil d'Égypte" (Magyd Cherfi, Zebda) - 3:11
6. "Ne me quitte pas" (Jacques Brel) - 4:27
7. "Mish fadilak" - 5:07
8. "Rah" (Atlas, Sabet) - 6:17
9. "Lelsama" - 5:48
10. "Fakrenha" - 5:04
11. "Manbai" (Nitin Sawhney remix) (Essam Rashad, Atlas) - 7:47

French edition

1. "Shubra" - 5:40
2. "Le Goût du Pain" (Didier Golemanas, Kamel El Habchi) - 3:37
3. "Ashwa" - 6:00
4. "Ayeshteni" - 4:54
5. "Ne me quitte pas" - 4:27
6. "Mish fadilak" - 5:07
7. "Rah" - 6:17
8. "I Put a Spell on You" - 3:39
9. "Lelsama" - 5:48
10. "Fakrenha" - 5:04
11. "Manbai" - 10:13
12. "Mish Fadilak" (French version) - 4:03

== Charts ==
Chart (1999)	Peak position
Belgian Albums Chart	46
French Albums Chart	36
Swiss Albums Chart	97
UK Albums Chart	141
