= Myriad Road =

Studio album by Natacha Atlas
- Released: 2015
- Genre: Jazz, world music
- Label: Decca
- Producer: Ibrahim Maalouf

Natacha Atlas chronology
Mounqaliba – Rising: The Remixes (2011)	Myriad Road (2015)	Strange Days (2019)

Myriad Road is a 2015 jazz album by Natacha Atlas. The album was composed and produced by Ibrahim Maalouf, with additional songs written by Natacha Atlas and Samy Bishai. The album, which is Atlas' first jazz record, features songs in both English and Arabic.

The album was first conceived in 2011 when Atlas and Maalouf met at a concert in Istanbul. Maalouf wanted to create a work that would avoid the characteristics of her earlier electropop albums which emphasized traditional costumes and belly dancing.

== Track listing ==
1. "Voyager" – 5:10
2. "Visions" – 3:22
3. "Ya Tara" – 4:04
4. "Oasis" – 3:23
5. "Nafs El Hikaya" – 4:01
6. "Something" – 4:05
7. "Heaven's Breath" – 5:25
8. "Nile" – 5:15
9. These Things – 3:07
10. "Hikma" – 5:01
