= Mounqaliba – Rising: The Remixes =

Mounqaliba - Rising: The Remixes

Remix album by Natacha Atlas
- Released: 27 September 2011
- Genre: Electronica, World music
- Label: Six Degrees Records
- Producer: Samy Bishai

Natacha Atlas chronology
| Mounqaliba (2010) | Mounqaliba - Rising: The Remixes (2011) | Myriad Road (2015) |

Mounqaliba – Rising: The Remixes is 2011 remix album by Belgian singer Natacha Atlas. It was released by Six Degrees Records on 27 September 2011. It consists of remixes of songs from Atlas' 2010 album Mounqaliba. The album was a limited edition; only 1,000 CD copies were pressed. To promote the album, Six Degrees Records offered a free download of the David Starfire remix of "Batkallim" before the album's release.

== Reception ==
The album received mainly positive reviews from critics. Chris Nickson of Allmusic gave it 4 stars out of 5, saying "they [the remix artists] all bring such variety without losing the heart of what Atlas intended". Kevin Fan of KJHK said "the punchy kick and snares will definitely keep your head bobbing while you lounge".

== Track listing ==
1. "Batkallim: The Sun of Egypt (Cheb i Sabbah Remix)" – 8:59
2. "Makaan (Nikodemus & The Spy from Cairo Remix)" – 5:05
3. "Taalet (Radiohiro Remix)" – 4:53
4. "Batkallim: Recharged" – 3:50
5. "Makaan (Beats Antique Mix)" – 5:01
6. "Taalet (Zab Spencer Radio Edit Mix)" – 3:28
7. "Batkallim (David Starfire Remix)" – 5:21
8. "Ghouroub: For Tahrir Square (Syriana Remix)" – 6:41
9. "Mounqaliba (Another Fire DayBrixton Dub)" – 4:04
10. "Batkallim: Atlas of the World Mix (Bombay Dub Orchestra)" – 6:50
11. "Taalet (The Kaya Project Remix)" – 5:17
12. "Riverman (310 Radio Remix)" – 8:06
13. "Batkallim (Earth Rise Sound System Remix)" – 6:32
14. "Egypt: Rise to Freedom (Basha Beats Remix)" – 4:49
