= Kingdom of Heaven (soundtrack) =

Kingdom of Heaven: Original Motion Picture Soundtrack

Soundtrack album by Harry Gregson-Williams
- Released: April 26, 2005
- Genres: Classical, Soundtrack
- Length: 62:03
- Label: Sony Classical
- Producer: Harry Gregson-Williams

Kingdom of Heaven is the soundtrack to the 2005 film directed by Ridley Scott. The soundtrack was composed, co-orchestrated and conducted by Harry Gregson-Williams, performed in large part by Gavyn Wright and the London Session Orchestra, and released by Sony Classical on April 26, 2005. It is a medley of choral hymns featuring Catherine Bott and Iestyn Davies, instrumentals and percussions, and full orchestral performances.

== Track listing ==
1. Burning the Past (2:48)
2. Crusaders (1:41)
3. Swordplay (2:01)
4. A New World (4:21)
5. To Jerusalem (1:38)
6. Sibylla (Featuring Lisbeth Scott) (1:49)
7. Ibelin (2:05)
8. Rise a Knight (2:43)
9. The King (5:45)
10. The Battle of Kerak (5:36)
11. Terms (4:29)
12. Better Man (3:29)
13. Coronation (3:03)
14. An Understanding (4:13)
15. Wall Breached (3:43)
16. The Pilgrim Road (4:07)
17. Saladin (4:44)
18. Path to Heaven (1:38)
19. Light of Life – Ibelin Reprise (Featuring Natacha Atlas) (2:10)

== Additional music and lyrics ==
The film also includes several other notable contemporary and historical listings not included on the released soundtrack:

- 1186 - The plucked string instrument during the first few seconds of the film as the titles appear. Named thus despite the fact that the film states the year is 1184. This track is actually composed by Hans Zimmer.
- Vide Cor Meum – The operatic aria during King Baldwin IV's funeral, originally composed for the soundtrack of the film Hannibal.
- Ave Regina cælorum – The first stanza of this twelfth-century antiphon is used on the soundtrack in the track "Burning the Past".
- Raimon de Miraval, Chansoneta farai vencut – Occitan troubadour lyric of the early thirteenth century, used in the closing scene, and in the Director's Cut, in the flashback with Balian and his wife, performed by Ensemble Convivencia from the Troubadoure album.
- Guiot de Dijon, Chanterai por mon corage – French trouvère lyric from the time of the Third Crusade, used in the Director's Cut for Godfrey's flashback as he remembers Balian's mother.
- Valhalla/Viking Victory – Music used during the "knighting" scene before the siege, originally composed for the soundtrack of the film The 13th Warrior by Jerry Goldsmith.
- Passion Chorale – Music played during Raynald's death (specifically, an excerpt from St. Matthew's Passion, BWV 244, by J. S. Bach, the chorale "Befiehl du deine Wege", performed by the Hilliard Ensemble and Christoph Poppen and recorded for the album Morimur (track 8).
- Epitaph – A Nasheed-style song in Arabic by Luis Delgado from the Album Sueno de al-Zaqqaq ("The Dream of al-Zaqqaq"), is played in the scene in which Saladin enters the city. In this scene there are three songs from that album of Luis Delgado combined. The first is "Epitaph", the second is "Balansiya" and the third is "La Aurora Nocturna".
- Bibbe Leydi – This song is performed by Baaba Maal & Mansour Seck, used in the Directors's Cut, song played while Balian watches a toy boat float on water running down a wooden waterway in Ibelin.
- Rannanu (Sing with Joy) by the Savae San Antonio Vocal Arts Ensemble – Plays while the crusader army marches through the desert before the battle of Hattin.
- Saa Magni (Death is Terrible) by Oumou Sangaré – Plays during the sex scene between Balian and Sibylla.
- Family Feud - This plays during the scene of Balian and Salah ad-Din discussing the terms to surrender the city, originally composed for the film Blade II by Marco Beltrami
- Nunc Gaudeant Materna, a 12th-century ecclesiastical hymn by Hildegard of Bingen, played in the Director's Cut immediately after the son of Roger de Cormier is executed by Godfrey's company.
- The Crow Descends by Graeme Revell - Plays when Balian is attacked just after the Coronation. A slight rearrangement from the version featured on The Crow: Original Motion Picture Score.

== Reception ==
Professional ratings
Review scores
Source	Rating
SoundtrackNet	5/5 stars
Cinemusic	3.5/5 stars

The commercial soundtrack met with generally positive reviews, was considered one of the best film scores of 2005 and a top seller on Amazon.com; one critic claimed the soundtrack "transcends the film and works as a cohesive album that develops both thematically and musically throughout". Although another reviewer thought the film score "surprisingly forgettable... it should fail to connect with film music listeners and moviegoers alike", Jerry McCulley thought the soundtrack "rises admirably to the occasion with a sweeping orchestral score that masterfully trades on a wealth of disparate historical and stylistic influences".
