= Leysh Nat' Arak =

Single by Natacha Atlas

from the album Diaspora
- B-side: "Duden"
- Released: 1995
- Genre: Electronica, World Music
- Length: 6:07
- Label: Nation
- Songwriters: Natacha Atlas, Count Dubulah, Hamid ManTu, Attiah Ahlan
- Producer: Transglobal Underground

Natacha Atlas singles chronology
"Dub Yalil" (1994)	"Leysh Nat' Arak" (1995)	"Duden" (1995)

Audio sample
- file; help

"Leysh Nat' Arak" (English: "Why Are We Fighting") is a world music song performed by Belgian singer Natacha Atlas. The song was written by Atlas, Count Dubulah, Hamid ManTu and Attiah Ahlan and produced by Transglobal Underground for the Atlas' debut album Diaspora (1995). It was released as a single in 1995. The song was re-recorded and included on the 2005 compilation, The Best of Natacha Atlas.

== Background and meaning ==
"Leysh Nat' Arak" was inspired by ethnic and religious conflicts in Israel, Palestine, Iraq, and Yugoslavia. Written in Arabic, the song calls for peace and unity between Jews, Muslims, and Christians in the Middle East. Furthermore, it addresses Atlas' yearning to understand how and why her family emigrated from the Middle East to Belgium.

== Formats and track listings ==
These are the formats and track listings of major single releases of "Leysh Nat' Arak".

CD single
(NAT40CD; Released 1995)

1. "Leysh Nat' Arak" (Radio edit) – 4:11
2. "Leysh Nat' Arak" (Nueba mix) – 7:08
3. "Leysh Nat' Arak" (FDM mix) – 6:50
4. "Duden" – 6:38

12-inch single
(NR40T; Released 1995)

1. "Leysh Nat' Arak" (Radio edit) – 4:11
2. "Leysh Nat' Arak" (Nueba mix) – 7:08
3. "Leysh Nat' Arak" (FDM mix) – 6:50
4. "Leysh Nat' Arak" (Amenophis mix) – 6:38

== Personnel ==
The following people contributed to "Leysh Nat' Arak":

- Natacha Atlas – lead vocals
- Neil Sparkes – goblet drum
- Rafiq Rouissi – goblet drum, riq
- Essam Rashad – oud
- Larry Whelan – saxophone
- Simon Walker – strings
