= Gedida =

Studio album by Natacha Atlas
- Released: March 9, 1999
- Genres: Electronica, World music
- Label: Mantra
- Producers: Transglobal Underground, David Arnold

Natacha Atlas chronology
Halim (1997)	Gedida (1999)	The Remix Collection (2000)

Professional ratings
Review scores
Source	Rating
AllMusic	4/5 stars
Robert Christgau	A−
The Encyclopedia of Popular Music	4/5 stars
Pitchfork Media	6.4/10

Gedida (Arabic: جديدة, English: New) is the third album by Belgian singer Natacha Atlas. It was released by Mantra Records in 1999. In the Middle East, the album was released under the title Guzouri, with an alternate track listing.

The album sold around 40,000 copies in France, where "Mon amie la rose" was a top 20 hit.

== Critical reception ==
The Encyclopedia of Popular Music called the album "a confident mix of traditional Arabic and contemporary Western dance influences, seamlessly blended together." The Village Voice wrote that though Atlas "pulls styles in from everywhere—reggae bass, British dance beats, European orchestrations—the music is held together by her singing, which is Arab to its core." CMJ New Music Monthly called Atlas's voice "limber and evocative."

== Track listing ==
1. "Mon amie la rose" - 4:47
2. "Aqaba" - 4:37
3. "Mistaneek" - 4:15^{[1]}
4. "Bahlam" - 4:32
5. "Ezzay" - 5:18
6. "Bastet" - 6:17
7. "The Righteous Path" - 6:48
8. "Mahlabeya" - 3:29
9. "Bilaadi" - 6:18
10. "Kifaya" - 8:59
11. "One Brief Moment" - 5:27

Middle Eastern edition

1. "Aqaba" - 4:37
2. "Mistaneek" - 4:15
3. "Bahlam" - 4:32
4. "Ezzay" - 5:18
5. "Kifaya" - 8:59
6. "Mon amie la rose" - 4:46
7. "Bilaadi" - 5:49
8. "One Brief Moment" - 5:30
9. "Feres" - 7:37

Notes

- 1 The song was retitled "Mistaneek (Je T'attends)" and featured Sawt El Atlas when the album was reissued in 1999.

== Charts ==
Chart (1999)	Peak position
French Albums Chart	19
Norwegian Albums Chart	37
