= One Brief Moment =

Single by Natacha Atlas

from the album Gedida
- B-side: "You Only Live Twice"
- Released: 19 April 1999
- Recorded: A&M, Los Angeles and Air Studios, London
- Genre: Electronica, World Music
- Length: 5:27
- Label: Mantra
- Songwriter(s): Natacha Atlas, David Arnold
- Producer(s): David Arnold

Natacha Atlas singles chronology
"Bastet" (1998)	"One Brief Moment" (1999)	"I Put a Spell on You" (2001)

"One Brief Moment" is an ethnic electronica song performed by Belgian singer Natacha Atlas. The song was written by Atlas and David Arnold and produced by Arnold for the Atlas' third album Gedida (1999). It was released as a single in the United Kingdom on 19 April 1999.

== Formats and track listings ==
These are the formats and track listings of major single releases of "One Brief Moment".

French CD single
(Released in April 1999)

1. "One Brief Moment" (Edit) – 4:05
2. "You Only Live Twice" – 4:37
3. "One Brief Moment" (French Radio remix)

CD single
(MNT42CD; Released on 19 April 1999)

1. "One Brief Moment" (Edit) – 4:05
2. "You Only Live Twice" – 4:37
3. "One Brief Moment" (Klute mix) – 6:04

7-inch vinyl single
(Released in April 1999)

1. "One Brief Moment" (Edit) – 4:05
2. "You Only Live Twice" – 4:37

== Charts ==
Chart (1999)	Peak position
UK Singles Chart	125

== Credits and personnel ==
The following people contributed to "One Brief Moment":

- Natacha Atlas – lead vocals
- David Arnold – keyboards, percussion, guitar, programming, string arrangements
- Nicholas Arnold – conducting
- David White – mixing
