= Midway Still =

- Origin: Kent, England
- Genres: Fraggle
- Years active: 1991–1994, 2000–present
- Labels: Roughneck Recordings; Antipop Records; Boss Tuneage
- Members: Paul Thomson; Dec Kelly; Russell Lee
- Past members: Jan Konopka; Brad Aitchison

Midway Still are a fraggle band formed in the early 1990s in Kent, England. The band recorded a Peel session in 1991 prior to the release of their debut album, Dial Square (1992), on the Roughneck Recordings label, which was a subsidiary of Fire Records. The album was produced by Don Fleming, and was followed by Life's Too Long in 1993 (produced by Leatherface's Frankie Stubbs).

The band split before their third album was released, though a reunion of sorts took place in 2000, when Russell Lee replaced Jan Konopka on bass and a single, "Fuck You" was released in 2001 on Antipop Records. The band released another album, Note to Self, on Boss Tuneage in April 2010, followed by a tour. They have since toured in Japan, twice, in 2010 and 2012 for the "Note to Self" and "Always Ends" albums, respectively. Currently the band members are: Paul Thomson (guitar & vocals), Dec Kelly (drums), and Russell Lee (bass & backing vocals).

They cited influences including Squirrel Bait, Hüsker Dü, the Lemonheads, Dinosaur Jr., the Byrds, the Long Ryders, the Damned, GBH, Anti Nowhere League, Discharge, Motörhead, Venom, Metallica, AC/DC and Neil Young.

== Discography ==
=== Singles ===
- "I Won't Try" (test pressing)
- "I Won't Try"/Apple"/"Daynight"
- "Wish"/"You Made Me Realise"/"Everywhere I Look"/"Who You Are"
- "Better Than Before"/"In Front of You"/"I Won't Try (Lazy Version)"/"What You Said (Shimmyglitter Mix)"
- "Wow"
- "Slugabed":"Just Get Stuck"/"Abnegate"/"Three Five Nine"/"Still Get By"
- "Counting Days"/"Mod Song No. 2"/"Fragments"
- "Fly Me to the Moon"/"A Day in the Life of a Show Girl" (Released as a promotional freebie with the 'Life's Too Long' album)
- "Fuck You"/"Since You've Been Gone"
- "The Covers EP"

=== Albums ===
- Dial Square (Roughneck, 1992)
- Life's Too Long (Fire Records, 1993)
- The Desert (Recorded in 1994, released on Bitter & Twisted, 2011)
- I Won't Try (Compilation, Fire Records, 2005)
- Note to Self (Boss Tuneage, 2010)
- Always Ends (Bitter & Twisted, 2012)
- Go Team No Hope (Bitter & Twisted, 2016)
