= Amulet (song) =

Single by Natacha Atlas featuring Sawt el Atlas

from the album Halim
- B-side: "Andeel"
- Released: 1997
- Genre: Electronica, World Music
- Length: 4:59
- Label: Nation, Beggars Banquet
- Songwriter(s): Natacha Atlas, Count Dubulah, Hamid ManTu, Alex Kasiek
- Producer(s): Transglobal Underground

Natacha Atlas singles chronology
"Yalla Chant" (1995)	"Amulet" (1997)	"L'Égyptienne" (1998)

"Amulet" is an electronic–world music song performed by Belgian singer Natacha Atlas and Moroccan-French band Sawt el Atlas. The song was written by Natacha Atlas, Count Dubulah, Hamid ManTu and Alex Kasiek and produced by Transglobal Underground for Atlas' second album Halim (1997).

== Formats and track listings ==
These are the formats and track listings of major single releases of "Amulet".

CD single
(NAT86CD)

1. "Amulet" (Edit) - 3:59
2. "Amulet" (16B Productions) - 8:31
3. "Amulet" (Aywah remix) - 5:32
4. "Andeel" (Atlas) - 5:55

Vinyl single
(NAT86T)

1. "Amulet" (Edit) - 3:59
2. "Amulet" (16B Productions) - 8:31
3. "Amulet" (Aywah remix) - 5:32
4. "Andeel" - 5:55

== Personnel ==
The following people contributed to "Amulet":

- Natacha Atlas - lead vocals
- Sawt el Atlas - vocals
- Ahmed Mansour, Wa'el Abubakr - violin
- Simon Walker - violin, viola
- Keith Clouston - oud
- Lazarus Whelan - keyboards, clarinet, ney, saxophone
- Alex Kasiek - backing vocals, keyboards, programming, lute, strings arrangements
- Tim Garsaayid - goblet drum, riq, drums, ney, mizmar
- Hamid Mantu - drums, programming, dulcimer
- Count Dubulah - guitar, bass guitar, programming, string arrangements
- David White - engineering
