= Aki Nawaz =

English singer and musician

- Born: Haq Nawaz Qureshi; 15 March 1961 (age 65); Bradford, West Yorkshire, England
- Genres: Post-punk; gothic rock; political hip-hop
- Occupations: Vocalist; songwriter
- Instruments: Vocals; drums
- Years active: 1981–present
- Label: Beggars Banquet

Haq Nawaz Qureshi (born 15 March 1961) is a British singer, rapper and musician, known professionally and mainly by his stage name, Aki Nawaz. He is part of the band Fun-Da-Mental, and is best known for his controversial lyrics.

== Profile ==
Nawaz was born in Bradford on 15 March 1961 and he is of Pakistani origin. His parents had come from Pakistan to the UK in the early 1950s and settled in Bradford. He was raised in a working class family in the West Bowling area. In the 1980s, using his proper name Haq Qureshi, he played drums with the post-punk gothic rock band Southern Death Cult, a forerunner to The Cult, featuring Ian Astbury on vocals. When Astbury moved on to found his own band, the remaining musicians stayed together for a time as Getting the Fear, recruiting new singer Bee Hampshire from Futon, but eventually broke up. In 1986, Nawaz moved to London, set up a management company and signed artists to major record labels. Two years later, he formed Nation Records as a label primarily focused on creating fusions between different musical forms from all over the world for a more youth-oriented audience.

Nawaz advocates a certain Islamic orthopraxy, expressing total opposition to alcohol and drug use. He believes that there should be a unity between Afro-Caribbeans and Asians because he believes that the struggles that the two groups faced are exactly the same. Through his music, Nawaz attempts to "normalize" the Islamic presence in Britain as well as to explain the reasons for fundamentalist tendencies among Muslim youth. Nawaz has collaborated with many traditional musicians, both in the studio and live: these include Huun Huur Tu, Rizwan Muazzam Qawwal-Mighty, Zulu Nation (a South African hip-hop group), and Ghazi Khan (an artist from Rajasthan).

Fun-Da-Mental worked with progressive Asian bands to help fight racism and spoke at anti-racist benefits. The group emphasizes militancy and self-defence when tackling racism.

Nawaz has been criticised by Islamic community members not only for his lyrics, but also for his group Fun-Da-Mental's recital of verses from the Qur'an over musical beats. Some Muslims believe this goes against what they regard as a fundamental tenet of Islam. In this sense, Nawaz's musical contributions are considered controversial for their lyrics as well as for their religious content. Nawaz claims he is prepared to face the consequences of any of his albums' releases, saying, "I'll take all the blame. If they're going to lock anyone up they'll lock me up."

== Controversy over lyrics ==
The controversy behind "All is War" lies in its lyrics, which could be interpreted as glorifying terrorism. One of the songs, "Cookbook DIY," (the song's title being likely a reference to The Anarchist Cookbook) includes instructions for making a home-made bomb. The video to this song makes many visual references to America. The video ends with a shot of graffiti which quotes John F. Kennedy's statement "If we make peaceful revolution impossible, we make violent revolution inevitable."
