= Strange Days (Natacha Atlas album) =

Studio album by Natacha Atlas
- Released: September 20, 2019
- Genre: Jazz
- Length: 58:08
- Label: Whirlwind Recordings; Socadisc (France)
- Producer: Samy Bishai

Natacha Atlas chronology
Myriad Road (2015)	Strange Days (2019)

Strange Days is a 2019 jazz album by Belgian singer Natacha Atlas. The album is recorded in English and Arabic.

Singers Joss Stone and Sofiane Saïdi are featured on the album. Musicians performing on Strange Days include trumpeter Hayden Powell, pianist Alcyona Mick, drummer Asaf Sirkis, Idris Rahman, and cellist Ivan Hussey. The album was released in digital, CD and LP formats. The track "Lost Revolutions" references Atlas' 2011 song, "Egypt: Rise to Freedom", released in celebration of Egypt's January 25 Revolution.

== Production ==
Strange Days was recorded in London, Brazil and France and executive produced by Michael Janisch.

== Track listing ==
No.	Title	Writer(s)	Producer(s)	Length
1.	"Out of Time"	Natacha Atlas; Samy Bishai	Bishai	4:20
2.	"Maktoub"	Atlas; Bishai	Bishai	5:19
3.	"Min Baad"	Atlas; Bishai	Bishai	6:32
4.	"All the Madness"	Atlas; Bishai	Bishai	7:39
5.	"Sunshine Day" (featuring Sofiane Saïdi)	Atlas; Bishai	Bishai	4:05
6.	"Lost Revolutions"	Atlas; Bishai	Bishai	6:44
7.	"Inherent Rhythm"	Atlas; Bishai	Bishai	5:14
8.	"Words of a King" (featuring Joss Stone)	Atlas; Bishai	Bishai	7:19
9.	"It's a Man's World"	James Brown; Betty Jean Newsome	Bishai	3:47
10.	"Moonchild"	Atlas; Bishai	Bishai	5:50
