= Something Dangerous =

Studio album by Natacha Atlas
- Released: 19 May 2003
- Genre: World music, Electronica
- Label: Mantra Records

Natacha Atlas chronology
Foretold in the Language of Dreams (2002)	Something Dangerous (2003)	The Best of Natacha Atlas (2005)

Professional ratings
Review scores
Source	Rating
AllMusic	4/5 stars
The Guardian	2/5 stars
Stylus Magazine	B

Something Dangerous is the fifth solo album by Belgian world music singer Natacha Atlas. It was released in 2003. The album's title refers to the 2003 invasion of Iraq and the title track includes audio clips of a 2003 anti-war protest march. The French edition of the album features a bonus track - a version of the single "When I Close My Eyes" sung in French. The song is titled, "Quand Je Ferme Les Yeux".

== Track listing ==
1. "Adam’s Lullaby" (Jocelyn Pook; Natacha Atlas)
2. "Eye of the Duck" featuring Princess Julianna and T.U.U.P. (G. Duncan; Julie Higgins; Mike Neilsen; Natacha Atlas)
3. "Something Dangerous" featuring Princess Julianna (Julie Higgins; Mike Neilsen; Natacha Atlas)
4. "Janamaan" featuring James Kaliardos (Count Dubulah; H. Mantou; I. Matharu; Natacha Atlas; T. Whelan)
5. "Just Like a Dream" featuring Princess Julianna (Abdullah Chhadeh; Julie Higgins; Mike Nielsen; Natacha Atlas)
6. "Man’s World" (Betty Newcombe; James Brown)
7. "Layali" featuring Z (M. Nichol; Mike Nielsen; Natacha Atlas)
8. "Simple Heart" featuring Sinéad O'Connor (John Reynolds; Natacha Atlas)
9. "Daymalhum" (Andy Gray; Natacha Atlas)
10. "Who's My Baby" featuring Niara Scarlett (B. Higgins; Gerard Logan; Lisa Cowling; Natacha Atlas; Niara Scarlett; Sean Lee; Tim Powell)
11. "When I Close My Eyes" featuring Myra Boyle (B. Higgins; Lisa Cowling; Natacha Atlas)
12. "This Realm" (Andy Gray; Jah Wobble; Natacha Atlas)
13. "Le Printemps (For Mona)" (Natacha Atlas; Paul Castle)
14. "Like the Last Drop" (Andy Gray; Natacha Atlas)

== Bonus tracks ==
1. "Quand Je Ferme Les Yeux (When I Close My Eyes French Version)" featuring Myra Boyle (B. Higgins; Lisa Cowling; Natacha Atlas)

== Charts ==
Chart (2003)	Peak position
French Albums Chart	98
US Billboard Top World Music Albums	13
