= Mon amie la rose =

1964 song by Françoise Hardy

Single by Françoise Hardy

from the album Mon amie la rose
- B-side: "Je n’attends plus personne (Non aspetto nessuno)"
- Released: 1964
- Recorded: Studio Pye, London, England
- Genre: French pop
- Length: 5:26
- Label: Disques Vogue
- Songwriters: Cécile Caulier, Jacques Lacome
- Producer: Jacques Wolfsohn

Music video
- "Mon amie la rose" (French TV, 1965) on YouTube

Françoise
- French edition

EP by Françoise Hardy
- Released: 1964
- Recorded: Studio Pye, London, England
- Genre: French pop
- Length: 9:12
- Label: Disques Vogue
- Producer: Jacques Wolfsohn

Alternative cover 1966
- English edition's front cover

Alternative cover
- English edition's label of side 2

"Mon amie la rose" is a poem written by Cécile Caulier and Jacques Lacome, originally performed in song by French singer Françoise Hardy in 1964. It became one of Hardy's most popular songs, and was collected on her album Mon amie la rose.

== Background ==
The song was written in response to the death of actress Sylvia Lopez from leukemia in 1959. It was first presented by Cécile Caulier on the French variety series Le Petit Conservatoire de la chanson. Françoise Hardy then contacted Caulier and offered to record the song for her 1964 album.

== Formats and track listings ==
=== French SP ===
- Disques Vogue (V.45-1252), 1964.
  - A-side: "Mon amie la rose" (lyrics: Cécile Caulier / music: Cécile Caulier and Jacques Lacome) – 2:17
  - B-side: "Je n’attends plus personne" ("Non aspetto nessuno"), (ad. lyrics from G. Meccia: F. Hardy / music: E. Ciacci) – 3:09

=== French EP ===
- Disques Vogue] (EPL. 8291), 1964.
  - A1: "Je veux qu'il revienne" ("Only You Can Do It"), (ad. lyrics from B. Well alias Charles Blackwell: F. Hardy / music: B. Well) – 2:41
  - A2: "Mon amie la rose" (lyrics: Cécile Caulier / music: Cécile Caulier and Jacques Lacome) – 2:17
  - B1: "La nuit est sur la ville" (F. Hardy) – 2:17
  - B2: "Nous étions amies" ("eravamo amici"), (F. Hardy, ad. lyrics from Rossi: F. Hardy / music: C. Combo) – 2:35

=== English EP ===
- Mon amie la rose, Disques Vogue/Vogue International Industries (VRE 5017), 1966.
  - A1: "Je n’attends plus personne" ("Non aspetto nessuno"), (ad. lyrics from G. Meccia: F. Hardy / music: E. Ciacci) – 3:09
  - A2: "Pourtant tu m'aimes" (F. Hardy) – 2:21
  - B2: "Mon amie la rose" (lyrics: Cécile Caulier / music: Cécile Caulier and Jacques Lacome) – 2:17
  - B3: "Je veux qu'il revienne" ("Only You Can Do It"), (ad. lyrics from B. Well alias Charles Blackwell: F. Hardy / music: B. Well) – 2:41

== Natacha Atlas cover ==
"Mon amie la rose"

Single by Natacha Atlas

from the album Gedida
- B-side: "Bastet"
- Released: 1999
- Genre: Electronica, world music
- Length: 3:29
- Label: Mantra
- Songwriters: Cécile Caulier, Jacques Lacome
- Producer: Transglobal Underground

Natacha Atlas singles chronology
"L'Égyptienne" (1998)	"Mon amie la rose" (1999)	"Mistaneek" (1999)

An electronic–world music version performed by British-Belgian singer Natacha Atlas was released in 1999. The song was produced by Transglobal Underground for Atlas' third album Gedida (1999).

=== Formats and track listings ===
These are the formats and track listings of major single releases of "Mon Amie La Rose" by Natacha Atlas.

- French CD single
1. "Mon amie la rose"
2. "Mon amie la rose" (French Radio remix)
- Belgian CD single
1. "Mon amie la rose"
2. "Mon amie la rose" (French Radio remix)
3. "Bastet"
- Promotional CD single
1. "Mon amie la rose" (Radio edit remix)
2. "Mon amie la rose"

=== Charts ===
Chart (1999)	Peak position
French Singles Chart	16

== Jarvis Cocker cover ==
In 2021, Jarvis Cocker released a cover version on his album Chansons d'Ennui Tip-Top.
