= Digitonal =

British musical duo

- Origin: London, UK
- Genres: Electronica
- Years active: 1998–2023
- Labels: Cactus Island Recordings, Dustpunk Records, Just Music, Seed Records, Toytronic
- Members: Andy Dobson, Dom Graveson
- Past members: Samy Bishai, Kat Arney, Jo Quail
- Website: www.digitonal.com

Digitonal is a British electronica music project led by clarinettist and composer Andy Dobson, with collaborations from violinist Samy Bishai, producer Dom Graveson, harpist Kat Arney and cellist Jo Quail. It formed in London in the late 1990s.

Reviewing their 2010 retrospective album Be Still My Bleeping Heart, BBC's Mike Diver agrees with the band's description of their own style as "neo classical ambient electronica", adding that, although at times predictable, their music is "extremely accessible, and incredibly pretty", "designed primarily to calm, despite occasionally boisterous beat-work." The Skinny described the duo's sound as akin to Philip Glass and The Orb.

Ben Weisz from musicOMH summarises Digitonal's work by saying that "while the rest of the world spent the noughties lurching from one musical fad to the next, Digitonal quietly created some of the most beautifully-constructed art of the decade. Alex Macpherson, from The Guardian, describes their music as "suited to accompanying a book, a dinner or a hangover [...] Very much atmosphere over action, but not necessarily a bad thing."

The group announced an indefinite hiatus on their website in 2023.

== Discography ==
- 23 Things Fall Apart (2002)
- The Centre Cannot Hold EP (2004)
- Live At The Oxygen Bar (2005)
- Save Your Light For Darker Days (2008)
- Be Still My Bleeping Heart (2010)
- Beautiful Broken (2015)
- Set The Weather Fair (2020)
- Performance (2025)
