= Yalla Chant =

Single by Natacha Atlas

from the album Diaspora
- Released: 1995
- Genre: Electronica, World music
- Length: 5:53
- Label: Nation
- Songwriters: Natacha Atlas, Count Dubulah, Hamid ManTu, Attiah Ahlan
- Producer: Transglobal Underground

Natacha Atlas singles chronology
"Duden" (1995)	"Yalla Chant" (1995)	"Amulet" (1997)

"Yalla Chant" is a world music song performed by Belgian singer Natacha Atlas. The song was written by Atlas, Count Dubulah, Hamid ManTu and Attiah Ahlan and produced by Transglobal Underground for the Atlas' debut album Diaspora (1995). It was released as a single in 1995.

== Formats and track listings ==
These are the formats and track listings of major single releases of "Yalla Chant".

CD single
(NAT60CD)

1. "Yalla Chant" (Sil Bachir Radio mix) – 4:24
2. "Yalla Chant" (The Lesson Four edit) – 4:37
3. "Yalla Chant" (She a Baad Gal edit) – 4:26
4. "Yalla Chant" (Latvian Shade) – 5:26
5. "Yalla Chant" (Sil Bachir mix) – 6:09
6. "Yalla Chant" (The Lesson Four mix) – 6:20

12-inch single
(NR60T)

1. "Yalla Chant" (Latvian Shade) – 5:26
2. "Yalla Chant" (Sil Bachir Radio mix) – 4:24
3. "Yalla Chant" (The Lesson Four edit) – 4:37
4. "Yalla Chant" (She a Baad Gal edit) – 4:26

== Personnel ==
The following people contributed to "Yalla Chant":

- Natacha Atlas – lead vocals
- Neil Sparkes – goblet drum
- Alex Kasiek – melodica, strings
- Walid Rouissi – oud
- Count Dubulah – bass guitar
- Acker Dolphy – midi bombard
- Hamid Mantu – multiple instruments
