= Fun-Da-Mental =

British music group

- Origin: United Kingdom
- Genres: Hip hop; ethno-techno; world fusion; UK hip hop
- Years active: 1991–present
- Labels: Mammoth Records; Nation Records; Beggars Banquet Records; Five Uncivilised Tribes
- Members: Aki "Propa-Gandhi" Nawaz; Dave "Impi-D" Watts; MC Mushtaq; Hot Dog Dennis; Nick "Count Dubulah" Page; Amir Ali; Shamil Khan; Nadeem Shafi aka Scalper; Lloyd Sparkes
- Past members: DJ Obeah; Inder "Goldfinger" Mantharoo; Bad-Sha Lallaman

Fun-Da-Mental is a British multi-ethnic hip-hop–ethno-techno–world fusion music group formed in 1991. The group is notable for its energetic fusion of Eastern and Western musical forms, for its outspoken political stance, and for its strong Islamic affiliation and advocacy. Fun-Da-Mental's political stance has led to the group earning the label "the Asian Public Enemy". The group's work has led to international attention and collaborations with artists from Pakistan, South Africa and Siberia.

== Membership ==
The core member of the group is Aki "Propa-Gandhi" Nawaz (real name Haq Qureshi).

Dave "Impi-D" Watts died in October 2024.

== History ==
=== Inception and original line-up (1991–1993) ===
By 1991, Qureshi had become more interested in the artistic and political possibilities of hip hop, although he initially believed that hip hop's politics were "much more sorted" than was its music.

The band was formed in the wake of the 1990s British Asian merging of hip hop and bhangra music, during which time various "conscious rapper" groups began to emerge. Common themes expressed in this style of hip hop were very politically based within the sense of race and the Asian identity.

This line-up of Fun-Da-Mental played the Notting Hill Carnival in August 1991 and continued to record and play concerts over the next two years. From 1992 onwards, Fun-Da-Mental began to release singles, beginning with "Janaam" and following up with "Gandhi's Revenge". 1993's "Wrath of the Blackman" (created around a sample taken from a Malcolm X speech) further established the group's assertive anti-racist sentiments.

=== Split of original line-up (1993) ===
In 1993, tensions within Fun-Da-Mental came to a head.

According to Aki, the other factor was business-related. Nawaz has admitted that he had been too immersed in the group's creative and promotional work that he had not paid attention to the group's sales figures, meaning that he had neither noticed nor revealed to other group members Lallaman and Inder Goldfinger Matharu, conversely, had believed that Fun-Da-Mental's press profile had translated into significant sales and were appalled to find out that the group was not making money. Lallaman and Inder Goldfinger Matharu subsequently formed Detrimental which built on Fun-Da-Mental's approach. Despite releasing the Xenophobia album in 1996, Detrimental ultimately failed to last as long as its parent group.

=== Second line-up and Seize the Time ===
This line-up released the first full-length Fun-Da-Mental album, 1994's Seize the Time (on Mammoth Records). The album name itself was derived from the Black Panthers slogan, and the group's lyrics and texts promoted a fervently anti-racist political slant. The group drew strongly on the history and philosophy of the Black Power movement in the United States, albeit focused through a British Asian/Afro-Caribbean context and globally aimed left-wing politics.

The response to the group's approach was varied. Some young British Muslims saw the group as providing a refreshing new meaning and interpretation of the fundamentals of Islam.

Fun-Da-Mental were subsequently given an opportunity to travel to South Africa. This inspired the single 'Gold Burger', described by the group as a tribute to oppressed peoples delivered on a global scale, and featuring samples of the ANC choir. The group also took the opportunity to perform with Cape Town's Prophets of Da City, one of the few hip-hop groups who rap in Afrikaans.

The uncensored version of the lead single "Dog Tribe" features a recording of a phone call from a member of the UK radical right-wing Neo-Nazi terrorist organization Combat 18, who uses the racial slurs nigger and Paki. A voice sample of this part of the song quietly appears after the end credits in Squaresoft's 1996 SNES video game Front Mission Series: Gun Hazard.

=== Further releases ===
Seize the Time was followed by a 1995 remix album With Intent to Pervert the Course of Injustice! released on Nawaz's own record label, Nation Records.

In 1998 Fun-Da-Mental released their second album of original material – the more punk/funk-inclined Erotic Terrorism – on Beggars Banquet Records. This was followed by 1999's Why America Will Go to Hell and the world-music-inspired There Shall Be Love! (2001). In 2003, Fun-Da-Mental released the Voice of Mass Destruction EP.

The release of the album into a tense political climate led to harsh criticism of, and verbal attacks on, Nawaz and Fun-Da-Mental. The Observer's review of the album All is War (The Benefits of G-Had) said "Strip away the outrage, then, and what's left is an album pieced together with great consideration. To provoke not just a reaction but thought and debate."

== Musical style ==
Fun-Da-Mental's music combines and juxtaposes Eastern and Western musical and cultural influences. These include British dance club electronics and American militant hip-hop inspirations, plus Indian, Afro-Caribbean, and worldbeat samples. The band's music also includes "a vast mix of Indian classical and popular film music, Moroccan Eastern drum beats, Qawwali sounds, Islamic chants, and the interweaving of dialogue from famous Hindi movies."

Musically, Fun-Da-Mental have borrowed extensive samples from Indian film music, particularly from the string sections. Through their juxtaposition with hip-hop rhythm tracks and angry raps, such samples are reconfigured, and a new hybrid Asian identity is emphasised. The band's use of "Indian Sounds" is symbolic of certain experiences for second-generation British Asians.

== Political approach ==
Fun-Da-Mental are an explicitly political and controversial band with an outspoken concern with social justice (particularly in regard to Britain's treatment of its Asian and Afro-Caribbean citizens) and have been described as "articulat(ing) eclectically a kind of militant Islamic-influenced, pro-Black anti-racist identity politics." The group takes pride in its militant stance, stating "We are hard politically, uncompromising musically and we won't be led by marketing angles. We try to give people a bit of confidence. People have to start educating themselves, respecting themselves." Because of their political stance, the group have earned the label "the Asian Public Enemy."

The name of the group itself deliberately invokes the idea of Islamic fundamentalism, while the hip-hop-inspired hyphenation implies and indicates another purpose, that of combining pleasure ('fun') with thought ('mental').

Sometimes criticised for writing "extreme" or "hard left-wing" lyrics, the band's stated aim is to try to educate the British youth about the presence of Islam and about the causes of extreme behaviour. Fun-Da-Mental frequently sample the voices and rallying speeches of historically significant protest leaders from the past such as Gandhi, Malcolm X, Louis Farrakhan and the Black Panthers. The group have also promoted the merits of militancy and self-defense through the lyrics of their songs.

"It's the white folks who need to rebel against their own ignorance – racism is their problem, economic terrorism is their problem, pollution is their problem – everything that is going wrong they have a hand in, they have an influence in – with all that is wrong in the world they are lucky to be dominating."

— Aki Nawaz

Despite their allegiance to black nationalism, the group has gained considerably more coverage in the student-oriented British music press than any other British hip-hop act.

=== Promotion and discussion of Islam ===
Fun-Da-Mental's lyrics consistently express the group's Islamic and ethnic pride, as well as the political issues which Muslims face within Britain. Exploring the position that Muslims are oppressed within Western culture because of their religion, the group aims to express the hardships and rejection which Western Muslims experience at the hands of their governments, and to assert through their lyrics the beauty of being Muslim. Nawaz has also directly incorporated quotations from the Qur'an into Fun-Da-Mental tracks. The band's symbol is a crescent, which not only invokes the sense of Islam but also of the Pakistani flag. Notably, Aki Nawaz's mother was one of the leading activists for Benazir Bhutto's Pakistan Peoples Party.

"It's always been about destroying all the stereotypical ideas about us and others and fighting against the preconceived misconceptions of a host society that has been poisoned by the past"

— Aki Nawaz

Fun-Da-Mental has also been one of the first British music groups to actively and fiercely defend the Muslim community by example. In particular, Fun-Da-Mental have set out to appeal to and voice the concerns of the alienated Muslim youth of British towns such as Bradford (Nawaz's birthplace and the original hometown of the group). Consequently, Fun-Da-mental has reached a significant number of British Muslim youths who identify with the situations and topics covered in the group's lyrics, slogans and presentation.

As is common within any culture with a hybrid demographic, British-born youths of Islamic heritage were struggling to fit into either aspect of their given identity and were trying to find a place for themselves. Fun-Da-Mental made this hybrid identity accessible, and allowed the youth to explore themselves. They countered the strict views and opinions of mosque scholars and Muslim community leaders with their own political manifesto. "Fun-Da-Mental's expressions of pride in Islam appealed to Muslim youth who had been raised on British popular culture yet also felt wounded by British Islamophobia."

Fun-Da-Mental's work has been compared by cultural researcher Sanjay Sharma to that of the Nation of Islam in its combination of pro-black (or pro-non-white) assertion and condemnation of racism. The group has taken direct inspiration from several black activists in the United States and their reassertion of history. A particular inspiration was Malcolm X, who notably became a Muslim as part of his political journey: the group sometimes cite his pronouncement that "I am a soldier named Alaha, so put down the cross and pick up the X". In the song "President Propaganda", Fun-Da-Mental's lyrics rely on the rhetoric of the Nation of Islam to send anti-Western messages. The lines "you had us whipped, raped, and lynched/Took away the Quran, you gave us the Bible" allude to issues such as slavery and religious persecution.

== Discography ==
=== Albums ===
Year	Title
1994	Seize the Time
1995	With Intent to Pervert the Cause of Injustice [remixes]
1998	Erotic Terrorism
1999	Why America Will Go to Hell [remixes]
2001	There Shall Be Love!
2003	Voice of Mass Destruction [remixes]
2006	All Is War (The Benefits of G-Had)
2012	An Influence Invisible
2015	Philosophy of Nothing

=== Singles ===
Year	Title
1992	"Janaam"
1992	"Gandhi's Revenge"
1993	"Wrath of the Blackman"
1993	"Countryman"
1994	"Dog Tribe"
1994	"Cointelpro" (promo only)
1994	"Gold Burger"
1995	"Mother India"
1996	"Goddevil"
1997	"Ja Sha Taan"
1998	"Demonised Soul"
2001	"The Last Gospel"

== See also ==
- Native Deen
- DAM (band)
- Dirty Kuffar
- Mecca2Medina
