= Mounqaliba =

Studio album by Natacha Atlas
- Released: 20 September 2010
- Genre: World music
- Label: World Village, Six Degrees Records
- Producer: Samy Bishai

Natacha Atlas chronology
Ana Hina (2008)	Mounqaliba (2010)	Mounqaliba - Rising: The Remixes (2011)

Professional ratings
Review scores
Source	Rating
Allmusic	3.5/5 stars
The Guardian	2/5 stars

Mounqaliba (Arabic: منقلبة; English: In a State of Reversal) is a 2010 album by Belgian singer Natacha Atlas. Co-produced by Samy Bishai, it was inspired by the poems of Indian poet Rabindranath Tagore. In addition to original works, it also contains covers of Françoise Hardy and Nick Drake songs. The album also features composers Zoe Rahman and Jocelyn Pook.

The album features audio clips from non-commercial film director, and activist Peter Joseph and self-educated industrial engineer and futurist Jacque Fresco through multiple tracks, as well as references to Zeitgeist: Addendum and a resource-based economy.

Derek Beres named Mounqaliba on his list of the Top 12 Records of 2010 and Siddhartha Mitter listed it as one of his top 10 world music CDs of 2010. Contrary to these views, The Guardian music reviewer Robin Denselow gave the album 2.5 stars in his review; citing purposeful limitation of her vocal range, reliance upon "an easygoing swirl of Arabic-tinged strings and jazz-edged piano" and "[being] annoyingly interspersed with spoken 'interludes' [by Joseph and others]" as the reason for the rating.

In February 2011 Atlas and Basha Beats issued a remix of "Makaan" and "Batkallim" called "Egypt: Rise to Freedom" to commemorate the Egyptian Revolution of 2011. A download only album of "River Man" remixes was released by Six Degrees Records in 2010. The album features 4 remixes of "River Man" by 310, Jef Stot and Makyo as well as Atlas' original version that appeared on Mounqaliba. Mounqaliba - Rising: The Remixes, an album of remixes from Mounqaliba, (including "Egypt: Rise to Freedom") was released by Six Degrees Records on 27 September 2011.

== Track listing ==
All songs composed by Natacha Atlas and Samy Bishai; except where noted.

1. "Intro" - 0:56
2. "Makaan" - 4:26
3. "Matrah Interlude" - (Atlas, Bishai, Louai Alhenawi)
4. "Bada Al Fajir" - 2:01 (Atlas, Bishai, Alcyona Mick)
5. "Muwashah Ozkourini" - 3:42 (Traditional)
6. "River Man" - 5:37 (Nick Drake)
7. "Batkallim" - 5:57
8. "Mounqaliba" - 3:36
9. "Le Cor, Le Vent" - 3:43 (Atlas, Bishai, Khaled Mouzanar)
10. "Direct Solutions Interlude" - 1:38 (Atlas, Bishai, Andy Hamil)
11. "Lahazat Nashwa" - 3:03
12. "La Nuit Est Sur La Ville" - 3:34 (Françoise Hardy)
13. "Fresco's Interlude" - 2:08
14. "Ghoroub" - 2:24
15. "Evening Interlude" - 1:08 (Atlas, Bishai, Eser Ebcin)
16. "Taalet" - 3:11 (Atlas, Bishai, Tim Whelan)
17. "Egypt Interlude" - 2:13
18. "Nafourat El Anwar" - 2:58
