= Nation Records =

Nation Records is a record label set up by Kath Canoville and Aki Nawaz in 1988.

== History ==
The label was set up after major labels declined to release their fusion of world music and dance music, an album called Fuse (1989). Featuring the earliest appearance by Talvin Singh as Mahatma T, the label went on to feature the early releases of Asian Dub Foundation, Transglobal Underground, Fun-Da-Mental, Loop Guru, Hustlers HC, Natacha Atlas, Joi, Swami, TJ Rehmi and Charged.

== See also ==
- Lists of record labels
