= Mantra Recordings =

Subsidiary record label

Mantra Recordings was a subsidiary of Beggars Banquet Records.

== Artists ==
- China Drum
- The Delgados
- Dot Allison
- Gorky's Zygotic Mynci
- Natacha Atlas
- Parva
- Saint Etienne
- Six by Seven
- disraeli

== See also ==
- List of record labels
