= Natacha Atlas =

Egyptian-Belgian singer

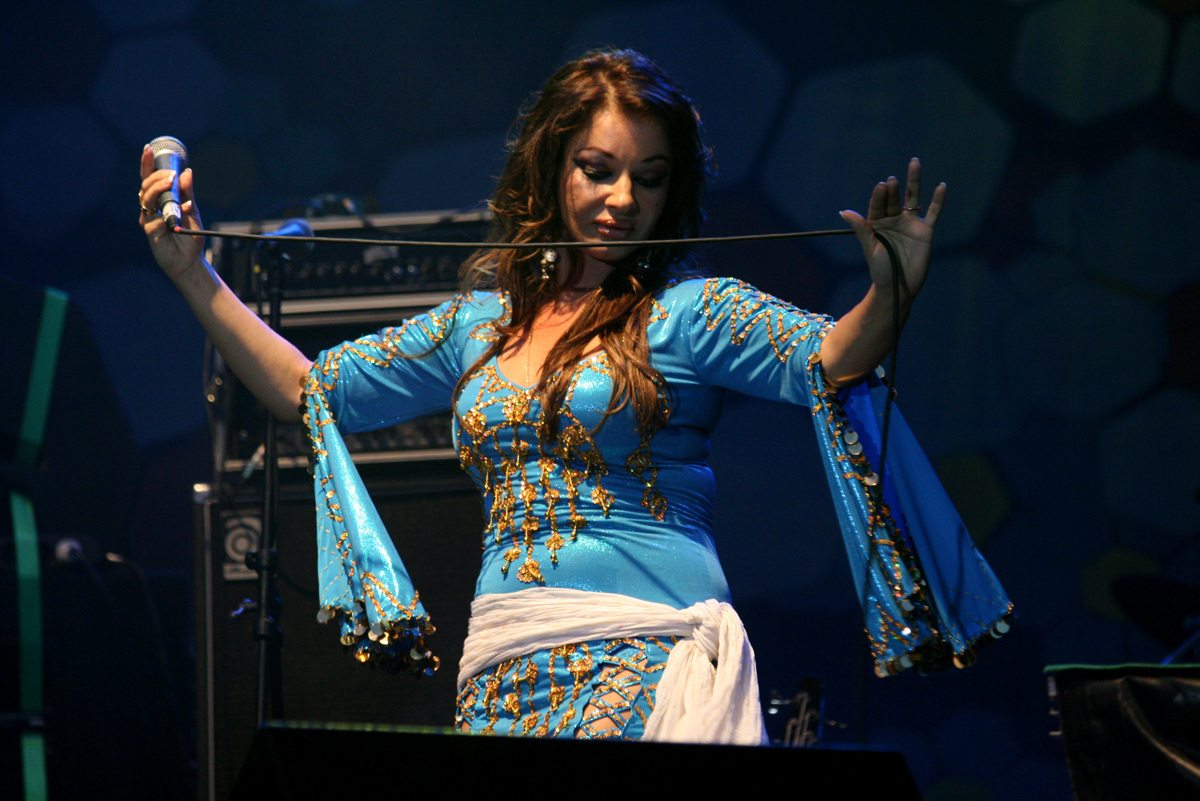
- Atlas in concert, 2008

Background information
- Born: 20 March 1964 (age 62); Schaerbeek, Brussels-Capital, Belgium
- Genres: World; Arabic pop; ethnic electronica
- Occupations: Singer, songwriter
- Years active: 1989–present
- Labels: Nation; Mantra; Harmonia Mundi; Six Degrees
- Website: natachaatlasofficial.com

Natacha Atlas (Arabic: نتاشا أطلس, natāšā ʔaṭlas, [nataːʃaː ʔatˤlas]; born 20 March 1964) is an Egyptian-Belgian singer known for her fusion of Arabic and Western music, particularly hip-hop. She once termed her music "cha'abi moderne" (modern folk music). Her music has been influenced by many styles including Maghrebain, hip-hop, drum and bass and reggae.

Atlas began her career as part of the world fusion group Transglobal Underground. In 1995, she began to focus on her solo career with the release of Diaspora. She has since released seven solo albums and been a part of numerous collaborations. Her version of "Mon amie la rose" became a surprise success in France, reaching 16 on the French Singles Charts in 1999. Her most recent album, Strange Days, was released in 2019.

== Early life ==
Natacha Atlas was born on 20 March 1964, in Schaerbeek, Brussels-Capital, Belgium. Her British mother was raised Christian before adopting Buddhism in the 1970s. Her father, of Egyptian descent, was deeply interested in Sufi mysticism and the Gurdjieff philosophy of the Fourth Way. He also studied Chinese medicine and Taoism.

Atlas was raised listening to eclectic music from both Eastern and Western traditions. After her parents separated, Atlas went to live in Northampton, England, with her mother.

Atlas grew up speaking French and English, and later learned Arabic and Spanish. She sings in several languages, including modern colloquial Arabic, although she admits that she is not entirely at ease with it.

== Early career and Transglobal Underground ==
Atlas returned to Belgium at age 24 and began her career with two jobs: belly dancing and being the lead singer of a Belgian salsa band. In April 1989, she made her recording début as guest vocalist on Balearic beat-band ¡Loca!'s "Encantador" (Nation Records).

In 1991, Atlas co-wrote/recorded the ¡Loca! single "Timbal" and co-wrote/guested with Jah Wobble's Invaders of the Heart composing five tracks for their Rising Above Bedlam album. Through recording with ¡Loca!, she met Nation-labelmates Transglobal Underground, a British ethnic electronica band with a Middle Eastern/South Asian focus. At the time, Transglobal Underground had a top 40 hit, "Templehead", and Atlas became their lead singer and belly dancer. Additionally in 1991, Atlas collaborated with Bauhaus/Love and Rockets/Tones on Tail guitarist and vocalist Daniel Ash on his debut solo album Coming Down. She contributed extensive vocal work as well as keyboards and bass guitar.

== Solo career ==
Most of Atlas' earlier albums were produced by Tim Whelan and Hamilton Lee from Transglobal Underground. These albums include Diaspora (1995), Halim (1997) (in honour of Egyptian singer Abdel Halim Hafez), Gedida (1998), and Ayeshteni (2001).

Atlas has always spoken her mind about the way both she and Transglobal Underground were seen by the UK press back in the late 1990s and early 2000s. "Someone from the New Musical Express rang us about a feature we're to do with them and said 'We don't want it to be about the multi-cultural angle'. In other words that fad is over. And I'm personally insulted... what other angle is there for us?! I get sick of it all."

In 1999, Atlas collaborated with David Arnold on the song "One Brief Moment". The single featured a cover version of the theme song from the James Bond film You Only Live Twice. Two years earlier, Atlas collaborated with Arnold on the album Shaken and Stirred, recording the song "From Russia with Love" for the eponymous film (originally performed by Matt Monro).

Also in 1999, she collaborated with Jean-Michel Jarre for the track "C'est la vie" on his album Métamorphoses. The track was released as a single.

In 2003, Atlas provided vocals for the Kolo folk dance song "'Ajde Jano" on Nigel Kennedy and Kroke's album, East Meets East. In 2005, she contributed the song "Just Like A Dream" (from Something Dangerous) to the charity album Voyces United for UNHCR.

Her music has been used in a number of soundtracks. Her song "Kidda" was featured on the Sex and the City 2 soundtrack and in the 2005 video game Grand Theft Auto: Liberty City Stories on Radio del Mundo. In 2003, her voice can be heard in the film Hulk on the song "Captured". Additionally, her song "Bathaddak" is one of the songs included in the 2007 Xbox 360 video game Project Gotham Racing 4. Her cover of I Put a Spell on You was used in the 2002 film Divine Intervention by Palestinian director Elia Suleiman.

Atlas was originally billed to star in and provide the soundtrack to the film Whatever Lola Wants, directed by Nabil Ayouch. However, shooting delays caused Atlas to only be involved in the film's soundtrack. Her song "Gafsa" from her 1997 album Halim was used in the main soundtrack of the 2004 Korean film Bin-Jip (also known as 3-Iron) by Kim Ki-Duk. She participated in the piece "Light of Life (Ibelin Reprise)" for the soundtrack of Ridley Scott's Kingdom of Heaven.

In 2007, Atlas collaborated with Belinda Carlisle for Carlisle's seventh album Voilà. She contributed additional vocals on songs "Ma jeunesse fout le camp," "La Vie en rose", "Bonnie et Clyde" and "Des ronds dans l'eau." Voilà was released via Rykodisc in the U.K. on 5 February 2007 and in the U.S. the following day.

The 2007 film Brick Lane features four songs with vocals by Atlas, "Adam's Lullaby", "Running Through the Night", "Love Blossoms" and "Rite of Passage". On 23 May 2008 Atlas released a new album, Ana Hina, which was well received by critics.

In 2008, two of Atlas' songs, "Kidda" and "Ghanwa Bossanova", were used in Shamim Sarif's romantic comedy about two women, I Can't Think Straight. In 2008, she sang lead in the song "Habibe" from Peter Gabriel's long-awaited album and project, Big Blue Ball. On 20 September 2010 Atlas released Mounqaliba. Co-produced by Samy Bishai, it explored classical instrumentation, jazz and traditional Arabic styles and was inspired by the poems of Indian poet Rabindranath Tagore.

In May 2013, Natacha Atlas released Expressions: Live in Toulouse, an album which showcased her expressive voice using largely orchestral arrangements augmented by Middle Eastern percussion.

Atlas moved into the jazz genre with the albums Myriad Road (2015), which was produced by French Lebanese musician Ibrahim Maalouf, and Strange Days (2019).

In 2020, she rejoined Transglobal Underground for their album Walls Have Ears and has been touring steadily with the band since 2021.

== Personal life ==
In 1999, Atlas married Syrian kanun player Abdullah Chhadeh. The couple divorced in 2005.

As of 2009, Atlas was in a relationship with British Egyptian violinist Samy Bishai, who produced her 2010 release Mounqaliba. The couple divide their time between London and France.

Atlas has said in the past that she is "technically Muslim" and that she identifies with Sufism. She also stated that her father has some Sephardic Jewish ancestry. Atlas said more recently, "These days I prefer to say that I'm Anglo-Middle Eastern and leave the religion out of it." She is, however, open to other forms of spirituality because "it's important to be tolerant".

In 2001, she was appointed by Mary Robinson as a Goodwill Ambassador for the United Nations Conference Against Racism. Robinson chose Atlas because "she embodies the message that there is a strength in diversity. That our differences – be they ethnic, racial or religious – are a source of riches to be embraced rather than feared".

Atlas has been a proponent of The Zeitgeist Movement. She included clips from Zeitgeist: Addendum in her 2010 album Mounqaliba.

== Political views on Israel ==
In a joint interview with the Israeli singer Yasmin Levy, Atlas noted the risk of the collaboration because feelings of anti-Zionism across the Arab world can spill over into anti-Semitism: "Some Arabic artists wouldn't even consider working with anyone Jewish." Of her experience of working with Levy, Atlas said: "We spent a lot of time in this little room, just talking and drinking wine", recalls Natacha, "and it was like I’d known her all my life. I’d missed that female Middle Eastern company, as most of the Middle Eastern people I know here are men."

In March 2011, Atlas announced that she had joined the boycott of Israel and had withdrawn from a scheduled performance in Israel. She gave her reasoning as follows:

"I would have personally asked my Israeli fans face-to-face to fight this apartheid with peace in their hearts, but after much deliberation I now see that it would be more effective a statement to not go to Israel until this systemized apartheid is abolished once and for all."

By May 2014, when she gave a concert at the Méditerranée Festival in Ashdod, Atlas had clearly changed her mind on the issue of boycott:

"For years," Natacha Atlas told me, "I boycotted Israel and refused to perform here. But when I met a Palestinian fellow who’s married to an Israeli Jewish woman, something in me changed. Suddenly, this chance personal acquaintanceship made me think that maybe there should be another way. There’s nothing easier than to boycott and say that I don’t want to see Israel or meet Israelis or come here and perform. But then what? Where does that get you?"

== Discography ==
=== Compilation albums ===
- 2000: The Remix Collection
- 2005: The Best of Natacha Atlas
- 2013: Five Albums (Her First 5 Albums in a Box Set) (Banquet)
- 2013: Habibi: Classics and Collaborations (2CD) (Nascente/Demon Music Group)

=== DVD ===
- 2005: Transglobal Underground
- 2009: The Pop Rose of Cairo

== See also ==
- List of Natacha Atlas collaborations
- World music
- Arabic pop music
- Yasmin Levy
