= Comment te dire adieu =

French adaptation of the song "It Hurts to Say Goodbye"

- A-side label of 1969 UK release. (Note: On this label there is a mistake in the firstname of one of the authors of the song; it should read A. Goland instead of G. Goland.)

Single by Françoise Hardy

from the album Comment te dire adieu
- B-side: "L'Anamour"
- Released: 1968
- Studio: Studio Pye (London)
- Genre: French pop
- Length: 4:39
- Label: Disques Vogue
- Songwriters: Serge Gainsbourg; Arnold Goland; Jack Gold
- Producer: Production Asparagus

Music video
- "Comment te dire adieu" (French TV, 1969) on YouTube

Françoise Hardy
- French edition

EP by Françoise Hardy
- Released: 1968
- Studio: Studio Pye (London)
- Genre: Pop music
- Length: 9:46
- Label: Disques Vogue
- Producer: Production Asparagus

"Comment te dire adieu" (English: "How to Say Goodbye to You") is a French adaptation of the song "It Hurts to Say Goodbye". It was originally recorded by Françoise Hardy in 1968.

"It Hurts to Say Goodbye" was written by Arnold Goland, probably best known for his co-operation with Phil Spector, and the American producer and songwriter Jacob "Jack" Gold (1921–1992). In 1966 it was recorded by Margaret Whiting on her album The Wheel of Hurt. In 1967 a release by Vera Lynn reached No. 7 on Billboard's Adult Contemporary chart.

These versions were interpreted in the style of a ballad, as was the first French version of the song with lyrics by Michèle Vendôme titled "Avant de dire adieu" which was released by Ginette Reno on her 1967 album Quelqu'un à aimer. More beat driven were the instrumental interpretations by Brazil's Walter Wanderley, dominated by the Hammond organ he is known for, and the Frenchman Caravelli, who focused more on strings, both published in the same year. The Jack Gold Orchestra & Chorus version, which was in a style similar to the Caravelli release, made No. 28 on the Billboard Easy Listening charts in 1969.

Françoise Hardy heard an "American instrumental version" of the song and her manager asked Serge Gainsbourg to provide suitable lyrics for it. The resultant "Comment te dire adieu" was combined with an arrangement relatively closer to the Caravelli version and included on Hardy's 1968 album. Hardy also recorded the song in Italian ("Il pretesto", 1968) and German ("Was mach' ich ohne dich", 1970; released on the album Träume, 1970.) The French lyrics are notable for their uncommon rhymes in "ex", within the subject of the song having a sense of "ex" as in "ex-boyfriend".

A German version with new lyrics, titled "Ich sage dir adieu", was released by veteran Greek-German singer Vicky Leandros on her 2010 album Zeitlos.

== Formats and track listings ==
=== French SP ===
- Production Asparagus/Disques Vogue/Vogue international industries (V.45-1552), 1968.
  - A-side: "Comment te dire adieu" ("It Hurts to Say Goodbye"), (ad. lyrics from Jack Gold: Serge Gainsbourg / music: Arnold Goland, arr. S. Gainsbourg) – 2:25
  - B-side: "L'Anamour" (lyrics and music: Serge Gainsbourg) – 2:14

=== English SP ===
- Asparagus Production/United Artists (UP 35011 ), 1969.
  - A-side: "Comment te dire adieu" ("It Hurts to Say Goodbye"), (ad. lyrics from Jack Gold: Serge Gainsbourg / music: Arnold Goland, arr. S. Gainsbourg) – 2:25
  - B-side: "La Mer, les étoiles et le vent" (lyrics and music: Françoise Hardy) – 1:50

=== French EP ===
- Production Asparagus/disques Vogue/Vogue international industries (EPL 8652), 1968.
  - A1: "Comment te dire adieu" ("It Hurts to Say Goodbye"), (ad. lyrics from Jack Gold: Serge Gainsbourg / music: Arnold Goland, arr. S. Gainsbourg) – 2:25
  - A2: "Il vaut mieux une petite maison dans la main, qu'un grand château dans les nuages" (lyrics: Jean-Max Rivière / music: Gérard Bourgeois) – 2:23
  - B1: "Suzanne", (ad. lyrics from Leonard Cohen: Graeme Allwright / music: L. Cohen) – 3:08
  - B2: "La Mer, les étoiles et le vent" (lyrics and music: Françoise Hardy) – 1:50

== Jimmy Somerville version ==
"Comment te dire adieu"

Single by Jimmy Somerville featuring June Miles-Kingston

from the album Read My Lips
- B-side: "Tell the World"
- Released: 30 October 1989
- Genre: House
- Length: 3:35
- Label: London
- Songwriters: Serge Gainsbourg; Arnold Goland; Jack Gold
- Producer: Pascal Gabriel

Jimmy Somerville singles chronology
"Comment te dire adieu" (1989)	"You Make Me Feel (Mighty Real)" (1990)

"Comment te dire adieu" was covered in 1989 by former Bronski Beat and Communards singer Jimmy Somerville, as a duet with June Miles-Kingston. It was a hit in the UK, reaching number 14 on the UK singles chart, helping Somerville's solo career take off. David Giles of Music Week deemed Somerville's cover as "a slightly housey version", adding: "The sheer vivacity of his performance sends the record soaring off the turntable, and the orchestral bits topped with spoken French are out of this universe".

=== Track listing ===
- 7-inch single
1. "Comment te dire adieu" (7-inch version) – 3:35
2. "Tell the World" – 4:12

=== Charts ===
==== Weekly charts ====
Chart (1989–1990)	Peak position
Australia (ARIA)	122
Belgium (Ultratop 50 Flanders)	23
Europe (European Airplay Top 50)	6
Europe (European Hot 100)	8
Europe (Pan-European Hot 100)	13
France (SNEP)	3
Ireland (IRMA)	3
Italy Airplay (Music & Media)	5
Netherlands (Single Top 100)	26
South Australia (ARIA)	89
UK Singles (OCC)	14
UK Dance (Music Week)	17
West Germany (GfK)	25

==== Year-end charts ====
Chart (1989)	Position
France	20

Chart (1990)	Position
Europe (Eurochart Hot 100)	60

=== Certifications ===
Certifications for "Comment te dire adieu"
Region	Certification	Certified units/sales
France (SNEP)	Silver	200,000^{*}
^{*} Sales figures based on certification alone.

In France, the single reportedly sold at least 250,000 copies.

== Kate Ryan version ==
"Comment te dire adieu"

Single by Kate Ryan
- Released: 24 June 2016
- Genre: Dance-pop; house
- Length: 2:52
- Label: CNR Music Belgium
- Songwriters: Serge Gainsbourg; Arnold Goland; Jack Gold
- Producers: Yves Gaillard; Amro

Kate Ryan singles chronology
"Wonderful Life" (2016)	"Comment te dire adieu" (2016)	"Bring Me Down" (2018)

Audio
- "Comment te dire adieu" on YouTube

In 2016, Belgian dance singer Kate Ryan covered the song and released it as a stand-alone single via iTunes on 24 June 2016, under CNR Music Belgium. It was produced by Yves Jongen a.k.a. Yves Gaillard and Soufiane Amrani "Amro".

A music video accompanied the song, premiered via YouTube on 29 June 2016.
