= La maison où j'ai grandi (album) =

Studio album by Françoise Hardy
- Released: October 1966 (France)
- Studio: Studio Pye; London, United Kingdom
- Genre: French pop
- Length: 29:45
- Language: French
- Label: Disques Vogue
- Producer: Claude Wolfsohn

Françoise Hardy chronology
Françoise Hardy Sings in English (1966)	La maison où j'ai grandi (1966)	Ma jeunesse fout le camp… (1967)

La maison où j'ai grandi is a studio album of French pop singer Françoise Hardy. It was released in France in November 1966, on LP, Disques Vogue/Vogue international industries (CLD 702-30). Published without title, except for the word Françoise on the cover, but has become known by the title of the most successful song on the album, "La maison où j'ai grandi" ("The House where I Grew Up").

== Background and production ==
In Italy from the 27th to the 29 January 1966, Françoise Hardy participated in the 16th Italian Song Festival of Sanremo to perform "Parlami di te", written by Vito Pallavicini, to music by Edoardo Vianello. Vianello wrote another song, "Ci sono cose più grandi", which Françoise took as basis for her French version ("Il est des choses"). Another participant, the singer Adriano Celentano, wrote an autobiographical song, "Il ragazzo della via Gluck", which Hardy adapted in French for her fifth album.

"Il ragazzo della via Gluck" was ranked 2nd in the month of June 1966, in the hit parade of the radio show "Salut les Copains". "Rendez-vous d'automne" ranked 7th in this same Top 50 in November.

== Composition ==
Hardy's lyrics express "romantic longing, reflecting on what it means to lose love once you find it, or when it doesn't live up to your fantasies".

Hardy plays Spanish guitar on the record, alongside a harpsichord.

== Critical reception ==
Hazel Cills, writing for Pitchfork, deemed La Maison Où J'Ai Grandi to be a "more grown-up", "most well-produced", and "well-written record", compared to Hardy's previous discography. It achieved a "baroque sound [..] that matched the depth of her sorrow and its complexities", and became "cohesive in sound and subject matter". Cillis was particularly impressed by the song "Si C'est Ça", where Hardy's "whispery voice and hushed guitar playing operate on the same frequency".

== Track listing ==
Words and music were written by Françoise Hardy, except where noted. She is accompanied by the Johnny Harris orchestra.

1. "Je changerais d'avis" – 2:53
  Original title: "Se telefonando"
  Lyrics: Ghigo De Chiara, Maurizio Costanzo
  Music written by: Ennio Morricone
  First sung by: Mina, 1966
  French adaptation by: Jacques Lanzmann and Françoise Hardy
2. "Si c'est ça" – 2:09
3. "Rendez-vous d'automne" – 2:40
  Lyrics: Jean-Max Rivière
  Music written by: Gérard Bourgeois
  Accompanists: Charles Blackwell orchestra.
4. "Je serai là pour toi" – 2:24
5. "Peut-être que je t'aime" – 2:12
6. "Il est des choses" – 2:31
  Original title: "Ci sono cose più grandi"
  Lyrics: Eliana de Sabata
  Music written by: Edoardo Vianello
  First sung by: Tony Renis, 1966
  French adaptation by: Françoise Hardy
  Accompanists: Charles Blackwell orchestra.
7. "Comme" – 1:54
8. "Mes jours s'en vont" – 2:26
9. "Qu'ils sont heureux" – 2:21
  Lyrics: Eddy Marnay
  Music written by: André Popp
10. "Surtout ne vous retournez pas" – 2:20
11. "Tu es un peu à moi" – 2:14
12. "La maison où j'ai grandi" – 3:39
  Original title: "Il ragazzo della via Gluck"
  Lyrics: Luciano Beretta and Michele "Miki" Del Prete
  Music written by: Adriano Celentano
  First sung by: Adriano Celentano, 1966
  French adaptation: Eddy Marnay
  Accompanists: Charles Blackwell orchestra.

== LP records: first editions in English-speaking world ==
South Africa, 1966: LP, Vogue (VGL 7022).
United Kingdom, 1966: LP, Vogue/Vogue international industries (VRL 3028).
Australia, 1968: Vogue (SVL 933.540).
Canada, 1968: La maison où j'ai grandi, Vogue/Vogue international industries (VC 6024).
New Zealand, 1968: Vogue (SVL 933-540).

== Reissues on CD ==
- France, 1996: Disques Vogue/Sony BMG (7 43213 80052 3).
- United States, 16 October 2015: CD, La maison où j'ai grandi, Light in the Attic Records/Future Days Recordings (FDR 618).

== Reissue on 180 g vinyl ==
United States, January 2016: La maison où j'ai grandi, Light in the Attic Records/Future Days Recordings (FDR 618).
