= Clair Obscur =

Clair obscur, "light-dark" in French, is the French translation of chiaroscuro.

Clair Obscur may refer to:

- Clair Obscur (1988 film), a 1988 Canadian film
- Clair Obscur (2016 film), a 2016 Turkish film
- Clair-obscur (album), 2000 album by Françoise Hardy
- Clair Obscur: Expedition 33, a 2025 French RPG video game
