= L'Amour fou (album) =

L’Amour fou

Studio album by Françoise Hardy
- Released: 2012 (France)
- Studio: Studio Labomatic, Paris, France; Studio M1, Skopje, Macedonia
- Genre: French pop
- Length: 37:00
- Language: French
- Label: Virgin Records/EMI Group

Françoise Hardy chronology
La Pluie sans parapluie (2010)	L’Amour fou (2012)	Personne d'autre (2018)

L’Amour fou (Crazy Love) is the 27th studio album by French singer Françoise Hardy. It was released in France on November 5, 2012, on CD Virgin/EMI (5099997278726), and on December 3, 2012, on LP Virgin/EMI (5099997278719).

It was published in Great Britain on April 15, 2013, on CD, Virgin/EMI (5099997278726).

== 27th album ==
The album L’Amour fou (Crazy Love) contains ten original songs, featuring Hardy singing over ambient piano and string arrangements by the Macedonian Radio Symphonic Orchestra. Released 50 years after her debut album, her debut album (November 1962), the album appeared simultaneously with a book also titled L’Amour fou.

"My publisher wanted another book after my autobiography, which met some success," she said, "and I had these stories, originally written for myself many years ago, exploring the pain of love. He encouraged me to rewrite them, and they came out in conjunction with the album." On the album, Hardy incorporates a literary connection by setting a Victor Hugo poem to music. "I liked the melody, and while I generally do not like poems, this one was a marvel of simplicity. It goes: ‘Why are you coming to see me if you have nothing to tell me?’ I like that. [...] The album did not find a wide audience when released in France. Radio did not play it, as I feel radio only plays music for younger audiences, and for an artist like myself who does not tour, I need radio."

== Track listing ==
No.	Title	Lyrics	Music	Length
1.	"L'Amour fou"	Françoise Hardy	Thierry Stremler	2:29
2.	"Les Fous de Bassan"	Françoise Hardy	Pascal Colomb	3:48
3.	"Mal au cœur"	Françoise Hardy	Thierry Stremler	3:09
4.	"Si vous n'avez rien à me dire…"	Victor Hugo	Bertrand Pierre	3:44
5.	"Normandia"	Julien Doré	Julien Doré	4:56
6.	"Piano-bar"	Françoise Hardy	Alain Lanty	3:29
7.	"Pourquoi vous ?"	Françoise Hardy	Calogero	3:31
8.	"Soie et fourrures"	Françoise Hardy	Thierry Stremler	3:33
9.	"L'Enfer et le Paradis"	Benoît Carré, Françoise Hardy	Benoît Carré	4:05
10.	"Rendez-vous dans une autre vie"	Françoise Hardy	François Maurin	3:51
Total length:				37:00

== Personnel ==
- Photographer: Gilles-Marie Zimmermann.
- Artworker: Jean-Louis Duralek.
- Instrumentalists:
  - Drums: Fabrice Moreau (3-4-6-8-9), Mathieu Pigné (5), Erick Benzi (9).
  - Double bass: Laurent Vernerey (3).
  - Guitar: Michel Aymé (7), Erick Benzi (9), François Maurin (9).
  - Bass guitar: Laurent Vernerey (1-4-6-8-9), Pascal Colomb (2), Édouard Marie (5), Calogero (7).
  - Electric guitar: Dominique Blanc-Francard (3), Pascal Colomb (4), Arman Méliès (5), Darko Fitzgerald (5).
  - Steel-string acoustic guitar: Thierry Stremler (8).
  - Piano: Thierry Stremler (1-3-8), Pascal Colomb (2-4), Alain Lanty (4), Julien Noël (5), Dominique Spagnolo (7), Erick Benzi (9), François Maurin (9).
  - Kettledrums: Pascal Colomb (2).
  - Tom-tom drum: Julien Doré (5).
  - String section: Macedonian Radio Symphonic Orchestra, directed by Dzjian Emin (1-3-5-7-8), Pascal Colomb (2-4), Alain Lanty (6).

== Certifications and sales ==
Region	Certification	Certified units/sales
France (SNEP)	Gold	50,000^{*}
^{*} Sales figures based on certification alone.
