= Ma jeunesse fout le camp... =

Ma jeunesse fout le camp…

Studio album by Françoise Hardy
- Released: November 1967
- Recorded: Paris, France; Studio Pye, London, United Kingdom
- Genre: French pop
- Length: 31:30
- Language: French
- Label: Disques Vogue
- Producer: Asparagus Production: Françoise Hardy; Jacques Wolfsohn; Léon Cabat

Françoise Hardy chronology
| La maison où j'ai grandi (1966) | Ma jeunesse fout le camp… (1967) | En anglais (1968) |

Professional ratings
Review scores
| Source | Rating |
|---|---|
| Allmusic | 3/5 stars |

Ma jeunesse fout le camp... is the seventh studio album by French singer-songwriter Françoise Hardy, released in November 1967 on Disques Vogue. The title is highly idiomatic, but its general meaning in English is 'My youth is slipping away'.

The album was released halfway between her early years in the yé-yé phenomenon and her later, more singer-songwriter focused albums like La question. It has been described as "her farewell to the yéyé years."

== Track list ==
Except as noted, words and music were written by Françoise Hardy, and she is accompanied by the Charles Blackwell orchestra.

1. "Ma jeunesse fout le camp" – 3:05
  Lyrics and music written by: Guy Bontempelli
  First performed by: Michèle Arnaud, 1962
2. "Viens là" – 2:25
3. "Mon amour adieu" – 2:20
  Music written by: Hasell
4. "La Fin de l'été" – 2:35
  Original title: "À la fin de l'été… (Tu sais)"
  Lyrics by: Jean-Max Rivière
  Music written by: Gérard Bourgeois
  First performed by: Brigitte Bardot, 1964
5. "En vous aimant bien" – 2:15
  Accompanied by: John Paul Jones
6. "Qui peut dire?" – 2:05
  Accompanied by: Jacques Dutronc
7. "Des ronds dans l'eau" – 2:25
  Lyrics by: Pierre Barouh
  Music written by: Raymond Le Sénéchal
  First performed by: Nicole Croisille and Annie Girardot, 1967
8. "Il n'y a pas d'amour heureux" – 2:20
  Lyrics: poem by Louis Aragon
  Music written by: Georges Brassens
  First performed by: Georges Brassens, 1953
9. "Il est trop loin" – 3:40
  Original title: "Sorrow"
  Lyrics and music written by: Peter Yarrow and Noel "Paul" Stookey
  First performed by: Peter, Paul and Mary, 1962
  French adaptation by: Daniel Hortis and Danyel Gérard
10. "Mais il y a des soirs" – 2:10
  Accompanied by: John Paul Jones
11. "Voilà" – 3:20
  Accompanied by: Jacques Denjean
12. "C'était charmant" – 1:55

== Editions ==
=== LP records: first editions in the English-speaking world ===
- South Africa, 1968: Ma jeunesse fout le camp..., World Record Club (ORL 6016).
- Australia, 1968: Ma jeunesse fout le camp..., Phono Vox (LPV 005).
- Canada, 1968: Ma jeunesse fout le camp…, Disques Vogue/Vogue international industries (VC 6020).
- United Kingdom, 1968: Il n’y a pas d’amour heureux, United Artists Records (ULP 1191).
- New Zealand, 1968: Ma jeunesse fout le camp…, Phono Vox (LPV 005).
- United States, 1969: Mon Amour Adieu, Reprise Records (RS 6345).

=== Reissue on CD ===
- France, 1995: Ma jeunesse fout le camp..., Kundalini/Vogue/Virgin Records (7243 8 40501 2 2).
