= A Bullet Through the Heart =

A Bullet Through the Heart (Une balle au cœur)
- French theatrical release poster
- Directed by: Jean-Daniel Pollet
- Screenplay by: Pierre Kast
- Story by: Jean-Daniel Pollet
- Produced by: André Lapprand
- Starring: Sami Frey; Françoise Hardy
- Edited by: Denise de Casabianca
- Music by: Mikis Theodorakis
- Distributed by: Rank Organisation; Official Industries
- Release date: February 23, 1966
- Running time: 85 minutes
- Countries: France; Greece
- Language: French

A Bullet Through the Heart (French: Une balle au cœur, Greek: Μια σφαίρα στην καρδιά), released in the United States as Devil at My Heels, is a 1966 Franco-Greek crime drama film directed by Jean-Daniel Pollet.

== Plot ==
Holding an old resentment against Montelepre, a Sicilian aristocratic family, an influential gangster named Rizzardi (Vasilis Diamantopoulos) takes possession of the palace of the last member of the family, Francesco Montelepre (Sami Frey), who he plans to kill. Stripped of his property, Francesco flees to Athens to find a witness for Rizzardi's crimes so that justice is done. Despite the help of Carla (Jenny Karezi), a nightclub singer, his search is in vain. And now Rizzardi's henchmen, led by Navarra (Spýros Fokás) are in pursuit. Fleeing from village to village, Montelepre manages to kill them one by one. Meanwhile, he finds love with Anna (Françoise Hardy), a French tourist, with whom he decides to take refuge on an island. Still, Navarra finds and pursues them. Francesco kills him, but in the exchange of gunfire, Anna is fatally wounded by a bullet. Francesco returns to Sicily to take revenge by killing Rizzardi with Rizzardi killing Francisco.

== Technical sheet ==
- French title: Une balle au cœur
- Greek title: Μια σφαίρα στην καρδιά (Mia sfaira stin kardia)
- Spanish title: Una bala en el corazon
- UK title: A Bullet Through the Heart
- US title: Devil at My Heels
- Story: Jean-Daniel Pollet, Pierre Kast
- Dialogue: Didier Goulard, Maurice Fabre
- Cinematographer: Alain Levent
- Film editor: Denise de Casabianca
- Composer: Mikis Theodorakis
- Sound: Nikos Ahladis
- Production designer: Marilena Aravantinou
- Producer: André Lapprand
- Production: CMS - Lambessis Films
- Principal photography: May 24 - July 18, 1965
- Countries: Greece (Athens, Skiros, Peloponnese), Italy (Sicily).

== Cast ==
- Sami Frey as Francesco Montelepre
- Françoise Hardy as Anna
- Jenny Karezi as Carla
- Spýros Fokás as Navarra
- Vasilis Diamantopoulos as Rizzardi
- Lucien Bodard as Marcopoulos

== Soundtrack ==
- EP, Une balle au cœur, Barclay Records (70 960 M), France, 1966.
  - A 1: "Générique" (Mikis Theodorakis) - 3:00
  - A 2: "La Balle au cœur" (Mikis Theodorakis) - 1:32
  - B 1: "Kaimos" (Christodoulou / Mikis Theodorakis / sung by Jenny Karezi) - 2:30
  - B 2: "Naha dio kheria dio pathia" (Livaditis / Mikis Theodorakis / sung by Jenny Karézi) - 2:58

== DVD release ==
In 2020, the film was restored by Cosmodigital for La Traverse with the support of CNC. It was released on Region 2 DVD in March 2020 by Les Éditions de l'Oeil.
