= Comment te dire adieu (album) =

Studio album by Françoise Hardy
- Released: 1968
- Studio: CBE, Paris, France
- Genre: French pop
- Length: 31:14
- Label: Vogue

Françoise Hardy chronology
En anglais (1968)	Comment te dire adieu (1968)	One-Nine-Seven-Zero (1969)

Professional ratings
Review scores
Source	Rating
Allmusic	3/5 stars

Comment te dire adieu is the ninth studio album by French singer-songwriter Françoise Hardy, released in 1968 on Disques Vogue. Like many of her previous records, it was originally released without a title and came to be referred to, later on, by the name of its most popular song. The cover artwork was a drawing by Jean-Paul Goude.

== Track listing ==
1. "Comment te dire adieu" – 2:26
  Original title: "It Hurts to Say Goodbye"
  Lyrics by: Arnold Goland
  Music written by: Jack Gold
  First performed by: Margaret Whiting, 1966
  Also performed by its composer as Jack Gold Orchestra, 1969
  French adaptation and arrangement by: Serge Gainsbourg
  Accompanist: Jean-Pierre Sabar
2. "Où va la chance ?" – 3:14
  Original title: "There But for Fortune"
  Lyrics and music written by: Phil Ochs
  First performed by: Joan Baez, 1964
  French adaptation by: Eddy Marnay
  Accompanist: Arthur Greenslade
3. "L'anamour" – 2:14
  Lyrics and music written by: Serge Gainsbourg
  Accompanist: Mike Vickers
4. "Suzanne" – 3:08
  Lyrics and music by: Leonard Cohen (English version)
  First performed by: Judy Collins, 1966
  French adaptation by: Graeme Allwright
  First performed by: Graeme Allwright, 1967
  Accompanist: John Cameron
5. "Il n'y a pas d'amour heureux" – 2:21
  Lyrics: poem by Louis Aragon
  Music written by: Georges Brassens
  First performed by: Georges Brassens, 1953
  Accompanist: Jean-Pierre Sabar
6. "La mésange" – 2:16
  Original title: "Sabiá"
  Lyrics by: Antônio Carlos Jobim
  Music written by: Antônio Carlos Jobim and Chico Buarque de Holanda
  First performed by: Antônio Carlos Jobim, 1968
  French adaptation by: Franck Gérald
  Accompanist: Mike Vickers
7. "Parlez-moi de lui" – 2:37
  Original title: "The Way of Love"
  Lyrics by: Al Stillman
  Music written by: Jack Diéval
  First performed by: Kathy Kirby, 1965
  French adaptation by: Michel Rivgauche
  First performed by: Michèle Arnaud and Dalida, 1966
  Accompanist: Arthur Greenslade
8. "À quoi ça sert ?" – 3:31
  Lyrics and music written by: Françoise Hardy
  Accompanist: Jean-Pierre Sabar
9. "Il vaut mieux une petite maison dans la main, qu'un grand château dans les nuages" – 2:23
  Lyrics by: Jean-Max Rivière
  Music written by: Gérard Bourgeois
  Accompanist: John Cameron
10. "La rue des cœurs perdus" – 2:07
  Original title: "Lonesome Town"
  Lyrics and music written by: Baker Knight
  First performed by: Ricky Nelson, 1958
  French adaptation by: Pierre Delanoë
  First performed by: Richard Anthony, 1959
  Accompanist: Arthur Greenslade
11. "Étonnez-moi Benoît...!" – 3:03
  Lyrics by: Patrick Modiano
  Music written by: Hughes de Courson
  Accompanist: John Cameron
12. "La mer, les étoiles et le vent" – 1:51
  Lyrics and music written by: Françoise Hardy
  Accompanist: John Cameron

== Editions ==
=== LP records: first editions in the English-speaking world ===
- South Africa, 1969: World Record (ORC 6036).
- Canada, 1969: Reprise Records (RSC 8003).
- Australia, 1970: Disques Vogue/Phono Vox (LPV 004).
- New Zealand, 1970: A Portrait of Françoise, Interfusion (SITFL 934.133).

=== Reissue on CD ===
- France, 1995: Comment te dire adieu, Ed. Kundalini/Virgin Records (7243 8 40502 2 1).
