= Françoise Hardy =

French singer (1944–2024)

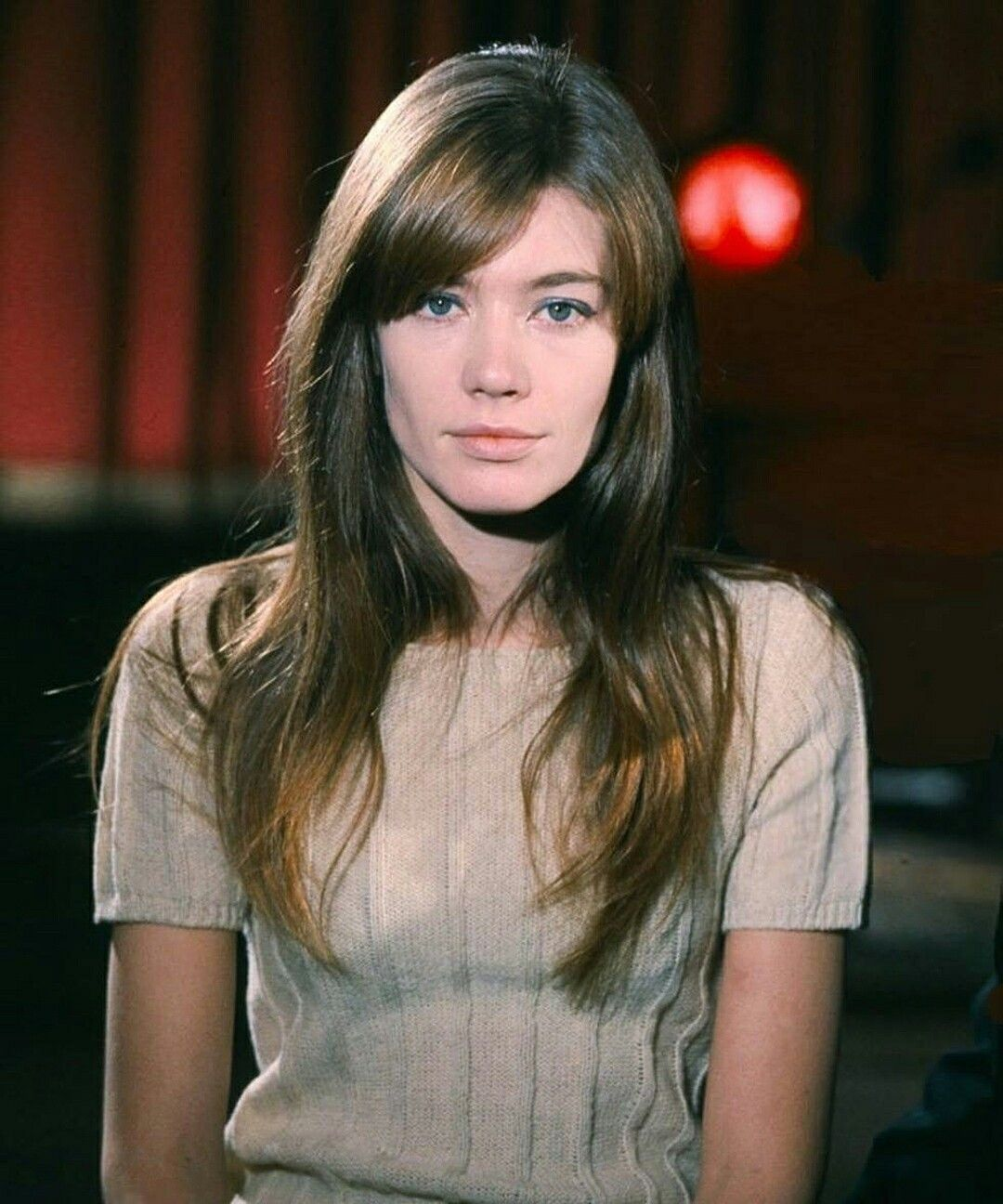
- Hardy in 1966
- Born: Françoise Madeleine Hardy; 17 January 1944; Paris, France
- Died: 11 June 2024 (aged 80); Paris, France
- Occupations: Singer-songwriter; astrologer; writer; actress
- Years active: 1962–2021
- Spouse: Jacques Dutronc (m. 1981; sep. 1988) (Note: Dutronc and Hardy remained legally married until Hardy's death in 2024, although they had been separated since 1988.)
- Children: Thomas Dutronc
- Musical career
- Genres: French pop; yé-yé; chanson
- Instruments: Vocals; guitar
- Labels: Disques Vogue; Sonopresse; Warner Bros.; Pathé-Marconi; Flarenasch; EMI; Virgin; Parlophone

Françoise Madeleine Hardy (French: [fʁɑ̃swaz madlɛn aʁdi]; 17 January 1944 – 11 June 2024) was a French singer-songwriter, actress, and author. She was known for singing melancholic, sentimental ballads. Hardy rose to prominence in the early 1960s as a leading figure in French yé-yé music and became a cultural icon in France and internationally. In addition to her native French, she also sang in English, Italian, and German. Her musical career spanned more than 50 years, with over 30 studio albums released. She also represented Monaco at the Eurovision Song Contest 1963.

Born and raised in the 9th arrondissement of Paris, Hardy made her musical debut in 1962 on French label Disques Vogue and found immediate success through the song "Tous les garçons et les filles". Drifting away from her early rock and roll influences, she began to record in London in 1964, which allowed her to broaden her sound with albums such as Mon amie la rose, L'amitié, La maison où j'ai grandi, and Ma jeunesse fout le camp.... In the late 1960s and early 1970s, she released Comment te dire adieu, La question, and Message personnel. During this period, she worked with songwriters such as Serge Gainsbourg, Tuca, Patrick Modiano, Michel Berger, and Catherine Lara. Between 1977 and 1988, she worked with producer Gabriel Yared on the albums Star, Musique saoûle, Gin Tonic, and À suivre. Her 1988 record Décalages was publicised as her final album, although she returned eight years later with Le danger, which reinvented her sound as harsher alternative rock. Her following albums of the 2000s—Clair-obscur, Tant de belles choses, and (Parenthèses...)—saw a return to her mellow style. In the 2010s, Hardy released her final three albums: La pluie sans parapluie, L'amour fou, and Personne d'autre.

In addition to music, Hardy landed film roles as a supporting actress in Château en Suède, Une balle au cœur, and the American production Grand Prix. She became a muse for fashion designers such as André Courrèges, Yves Saint Laurent, and Paco Rabanne, and collaborated with photographer Jean-Marie Périer. Hardy developed a career as an astrologer, having written extensively on the subject from the 1970s onwards. She also wrote fiction and non-fiction books from the 2000s. Her autobiography, Le désespoir des singes...et autres bagatelles (The Despair of Monkeys...and Other Trifles), was a best-seller in France.

As a public figure, Hardy was known for her shyness, disenchantment with celebrity life, and self-deprecating attitude, which were attributed to her lifelong struggles with anxiety and insecurity. She married French singer-songwriter Jacques Dutronc in 1981. Their son, Thomas, also became a musician. Hardy remains one of the best-selling singers in French history and is still regarded as an important and influential figure in both French pop music and fashion. In 2006, she was awarded the Grande médaille de la chanson française, an honorary award given by the Académie française, in recognition of her career in music. Hardy died of cancer in Paris in June 2024, aged 80.

== Early life and education ==
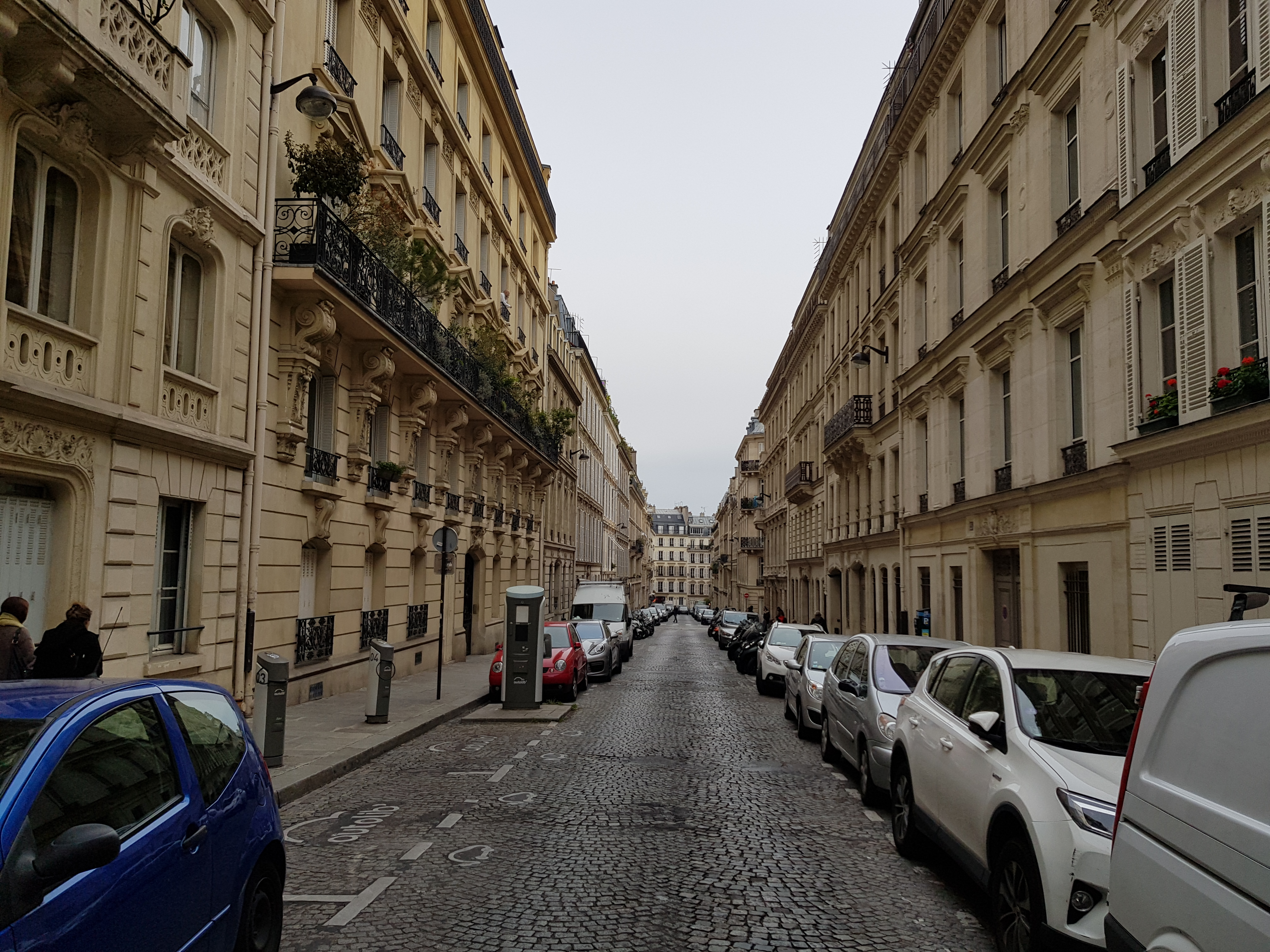
Hardy was raised in a modest apartment on the Rue d'Aumale, in Paris's 9th arrondissement

Françoise Madeleine Hardy was born on 17 January 1944 at the Marie-Louise Clinic in the 9th arrondissement of Paris in German-occupied France during World War II. She was born during an air raid and the windows of the clinic exploded. She related being born in this violent context to her "abnormally anxious temperament" as an adult. Her younger sister, Michèle, was born eighteen months later and their mother, Madeleine Hardy (c.1921–1991), who came from an ordinary background, raised Françoise and Michèle as a single parent. Her father, Étienne Dillard, was a married man who came from a wealthy family. He did little to help them financially and was an absent figure in their upbringing, only visiting the children a couple of times a year. Hardy's mother raised her daughters strictly in a modest apartment on the 9th arrondissement's Rue d'Aumale. Hardy had an unhappy and troubled childhood and mostly engaged in solitary activities like reading, playing with dolls, or listening to the radio.

At their father's insistence, the girls went to a Catholic school at the Rue La Bruyère, under the tutelage of Trinitarian nuns. The socio-economic gap between Hardy and her classmates was a source of lifelong insecurity. Her mental health was worsened by her maternal grandmother, who "told [her] repeatedly that [she] was unattractive and a very bad person". Between 1952 and 1960, Hardy and her sister were sent every summer to Austria to learn German, encouraged by her mother's new lover, an Austrian baron. Her father played piano, and Hardy was introduced to piano lessons as a very young child, which she dropped after experiencing stage fright when she was required to perform on stage at the Salle Gaveau.

At age 16, Hardy finished her secondary education and passed her baccalauréat. To mark the occasion, her father asked her what gift she would like, and she chose a guitar, with which she began to sing her own songs. Following her mother's orders, she enrolled in the Paris Institute of Political Studies while still a teenager, but finding it too challenging she left the Institute and enrolled at the Sorbonne to study German. Hardy used the time left from her courses to compose songs and began to perform in a small venue, where she played every Thursday "in front of an audience of retirees". Around this time she auditioned for record label Pathé-Marconi after seeing an ad in France-Soir. She was rejected, but was pleased that she had held the directors' attention for longer than she expected. She also felt encouraged after hearing her recorded voice, which she found "less off-key and tremulous than [she] feared".

== Music career ==
=== 1961–1962: Career beginnings ===
Hardy went to Philips Records and was recommended to take singing lessons. She auditioned for Le Petit Conservatoire de la chanson in 1961, a school for performers that aired on radio and television. The head of the program, Mireille Hartuch, was known for being selective. However, she saw Hardy enter the classroom and immediately accepted her before she could play. They developed a "mother-daughter relationship" and a friendship based on mutual esteem.

On 14 May 1961, Hardy auditioned for the French label Disques Vogue. Her looks caught the attention of their sound engineer André Bernot, who felt that she "would make a nice record cover", and offered to teach her music theory to improve her sense of rhythm. Bernot later recorded a four-track demo with her which he submitted to the label's directior Jacques Wolfsohn. Wolfsohn was looking for a female singer to record "Oh oh chéri", a French-language version of Bobby Lee Trammell's song "Uh Oh", and after auditioning Hardy Wolfsohn offered her a one-year contract, which she signed on 14 November 1961.

After hearing about Hardy's new record deal, Hartuch appeared on the Petit Conservatoire TV show on 6 February 1962. Hardy performed her original song "La fille avec toi" on guitar, after which she was asked what the English-language "yeah! yeah!" in her lyrics meant. The transliteration "yé-yé" was later popularised by sociologist Edgar Morin through an article published in Le Monde on 7 July 1963, in which he analysed the burgeoning youth-led pop music scene. The yé-yé phenomenon was coined by the radio program Salut les copains, created by Daniel Filipacchi, and its magazine of the same name.

=== 1962–1963: Yé-yé sensation ===
Hardy at the Grand Gala du Disque in the Netherlands, October 1963

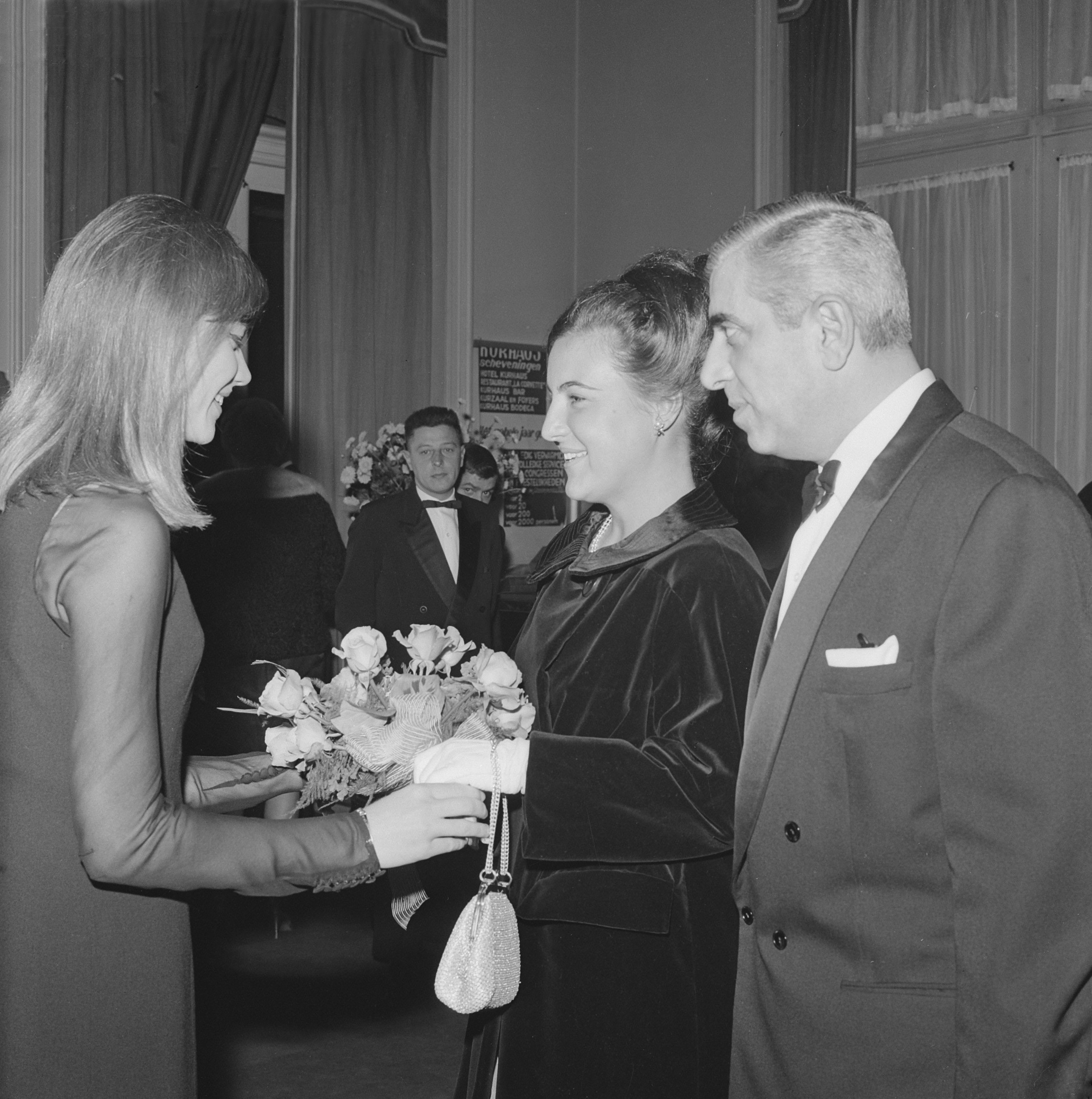
Meeting Princess Margriet and sports executive Jaap van Praag.

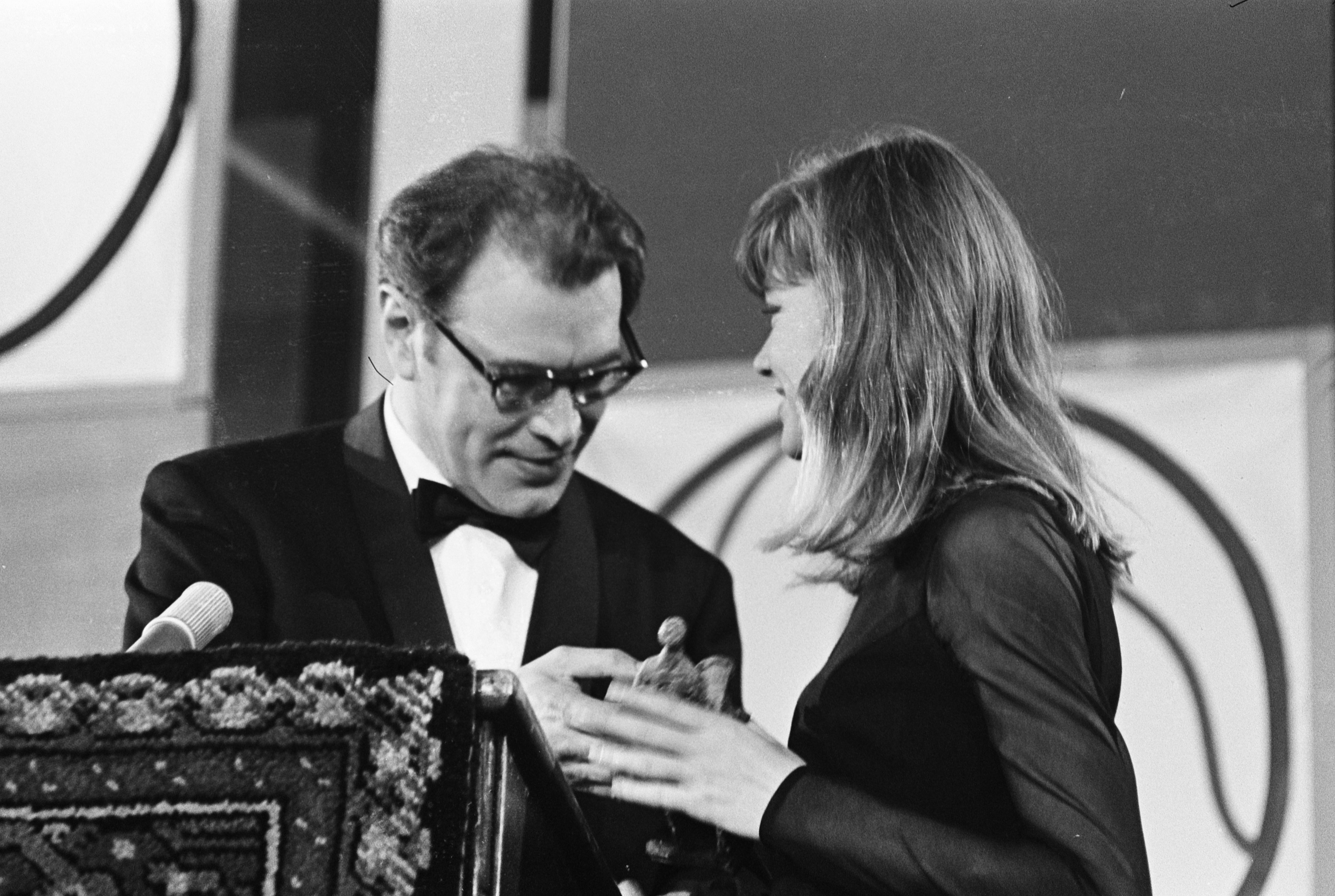
Receiving the Edison Award in the "Youth" category from writer and TV personality Godfried Bomans.

Vogue released Hardy's first extended play (EP) in May 1962, which included "Oh oh chéri" together with her compositions "Il est parti un jour", "J'suis d'accord" and the sentimental ballad "Tous les garçons et les filles". In early October, Hardy filmed a black-and-white music video for "Tous les garçons et les filles", directed by Pierre Badel, which appeared on the TV show Toute la chanson. The song was Hardy's choice, and also that of the show's producer André Salvet, despite Wolfsohn's reluctance to promote it. Hardy was introduced to a wider audience on 28 October when the clip was rebroadcast during a commercial break in the televised results of the presidential election referendum. The song instantly became popular among the youth in France, particularly teenage girls, and was widely played on radio stations, starting with Europe n° 1. "Tous les garçons et les filles" was further popularized by a Scopitone music video directed by Claude Lelouch.

Vogue quickly released two more EPs of Hardy's songs. These were later compiled, with the first EP for her debut studio album, which became known as Tous les garçons et les filles. In France the LP format was initially viewed with skepticism and Hardy's first series of albums were compilations of previously released four-track 7-inch records, a format known as "super 45 [rpm]". Most of her full-length records were released without a title, with only her name on the cover, and they came to be known by the title of the most popular song of the collection. Hardy's debut studio album was awarded the Trophée de la Télévision and the prestigious Grand Prix du Disque award given by the Académie Charles Cros. By early 1963, 500,000 copies of "Tous les garçons et les filles" had been sold in France, and the total rose to 2.5 million in the following months.

Hardy's singles "J'suis d'accord", "Le temps de l'amour", and "Tous les garçons... " topped the French singles chart in late 1962 and early 1963. She signed a new five-year contract with Vogue and an agreement with Editions Musicales Alpha, created by Wolfsohn. She met Michel Bourdais, a young designer recently discovered by Charles Aznavour, who created the first portrait of Françoise Hardy. (Which Hardy, artistically seduced, acquired.)

In March 1963, she represented Monaco at the Eurovision Song Contest 1963, recorded in London. She performed the song "L'amour s'en va", which came fifth in the contest. When the song was released as a single, it reached No. 5 on the French charts in June 1963. In October, Hardy released her second studio album, Le premier bonheur du jour. That month she received the "Youth" Edison Award at the Grand Gala du Disque in Scheveningen, Netherlands. She was presented with the trophy by the author Godfried Bomans, who praised her as a "creative artist" who knew how to impose "a personal style without trying to imitate the Americans".

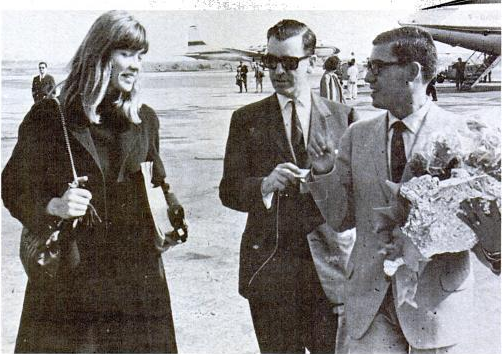
Hardy arriving in Barcelona in 1963, greeted by Hispavox international director Luis Calvo

As a leading figure of the yé-yé craze, Hardy found herself at the forefront of the French music scene and became the country's most exportable female singer. Beginning in 1963, translated re-recordings of "Tous les garçons et les filles" were exported to Italian, German, and English-speaking markets. The first non-French-speaking country in which the singer found success was Italy, where the song became "Quelli della mia età" and sold 255,000 copies. It topped the singles chart between April and October, dropping to second place between July and August behind Rita Pavone's "Cuore". At the end of the summer in Milan, she recorded new songs which were included in the Italian release Françoise Hardy canta per voi in italiano. The single "L'età dell'amore" / "E all'amore che penso" also topped the Italian charts.

=== 1964–1968: International stardom ===
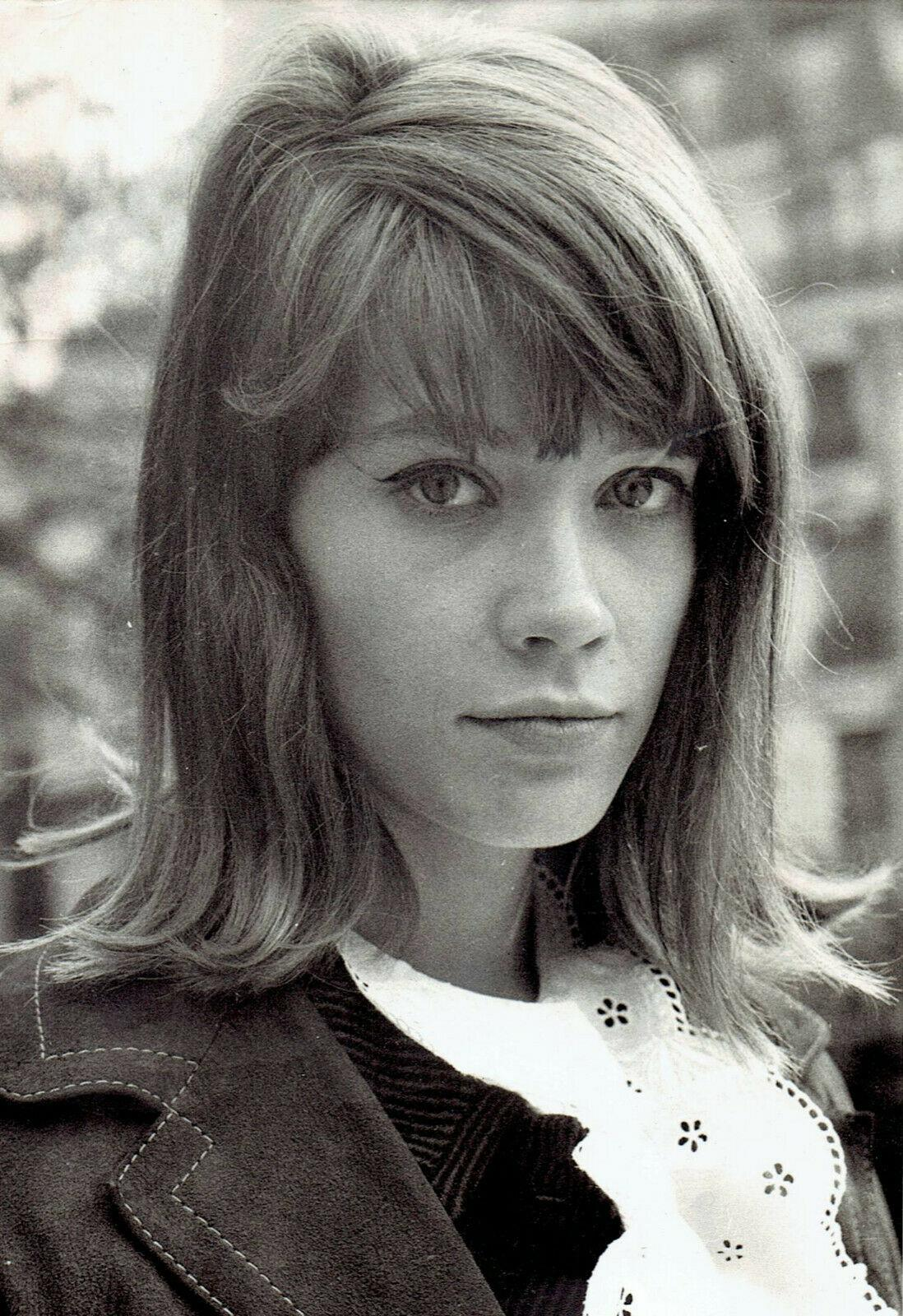
Hardy in 1964

In 1963, Hardy went to London to record new music. At the height of the British Invasion, Hardy sought to modernise her music, opting to leave the poor quality of French studios and sound engineers and record her songs at Pye Records studios. Working with producer Tony Hatch in February 1964, she recorded an EP that included a cover of "Catch a Falling Star" and three adaptations of her hits "Find Me a Boy" ("Tous les garçons et les filles"), "Only Friends" ("Ton meilleur ami") and "I Wish It Were Me" ("J'aurais voulu"). English audiences initially preferred her recordings in French, with "Tous les garçons et les filles" entering the UK Singles Chart on 1 July 1964 at number thirty-six.

Her 1965 English-language single "All Over the World" was a hit in the UK, reaching the Top 20 and staying on the charts for fifteen weeks. It was also successful in South Africa, Australia, and New Zealand, making it possibly her most popular recording among English-speaking audiences.

In 1965 Hardy flew to New York to sign a record deal with Kapp to distribute her records in the United States. The label released her debut studio album under the title The "Yeh-Yeh" Girl From Paris! and the single "However Much", an English version of the previously released track "Et même..." A German language album In Deutschland was released which contained five original compositions and translated versions of her previous songs. The most popular track in Germany was "Frag' den Abendwind", which remained on the national singles chart for twenty-four weeks.

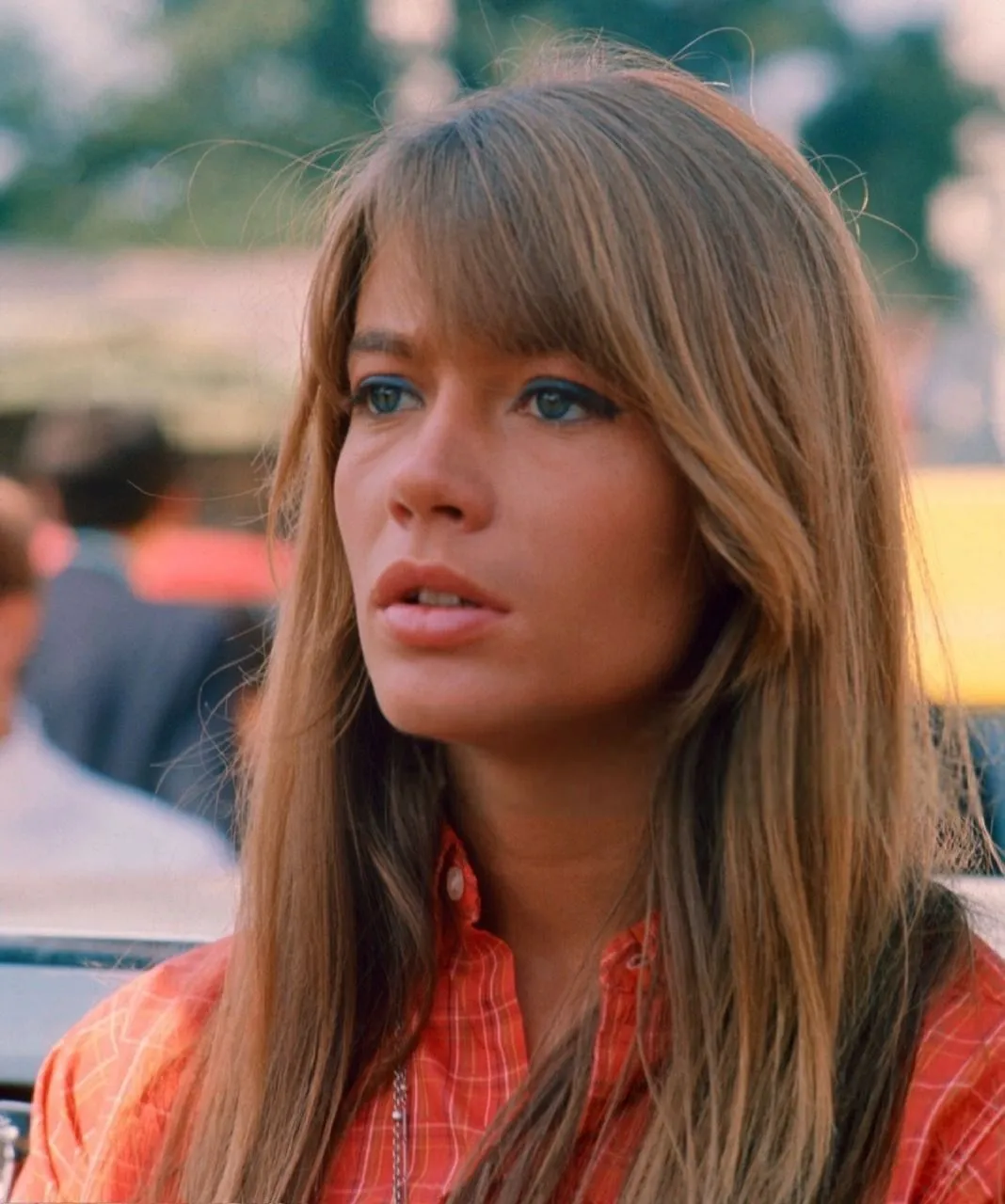
Hardy in 1966

On 12 April 1966, Hardy was among forty-six performers who took part in a group photograph shot by Jean-Marie Périer for Salut Les Copains. The image became a symbol of the yé-yé era and came to be known in France as the "photo of the century" (French: "photo du siècle").

Beginning in late 1967, Hardy took Wolfsohn's suggestion to release her records through her own production company, Asparagus, although Vogue continued to distribute them. She later regretted this decision, recalling in 1999: "The CEO of Vogue, Léon Cabat, was also in this production company and between them, they owned the majority of the shares. This has given rise to a lot of harassment lawsuits." Her seventh French album Ma jeunesse fout le camp, the first one produced under Asparagus, was released in November 1967.

On the advice of English producer Noel Rodgers, Hardy recorded her second English album in the spring of 1968, known variously as En anglais, The Second English Album, Will You Love Me Tomorrow, and Loving, depending on the country.

In 1968, Hardy released a French cover of Vera Lynn's "It Hurts to Say Goodbye", titled "Comment te dire adieu", on the album of the same name. Its French lyrics were written by Serge Gainsbourg, and it became one of her most successful releases.

=== 1969–1976: Transition to artistic maturity ===
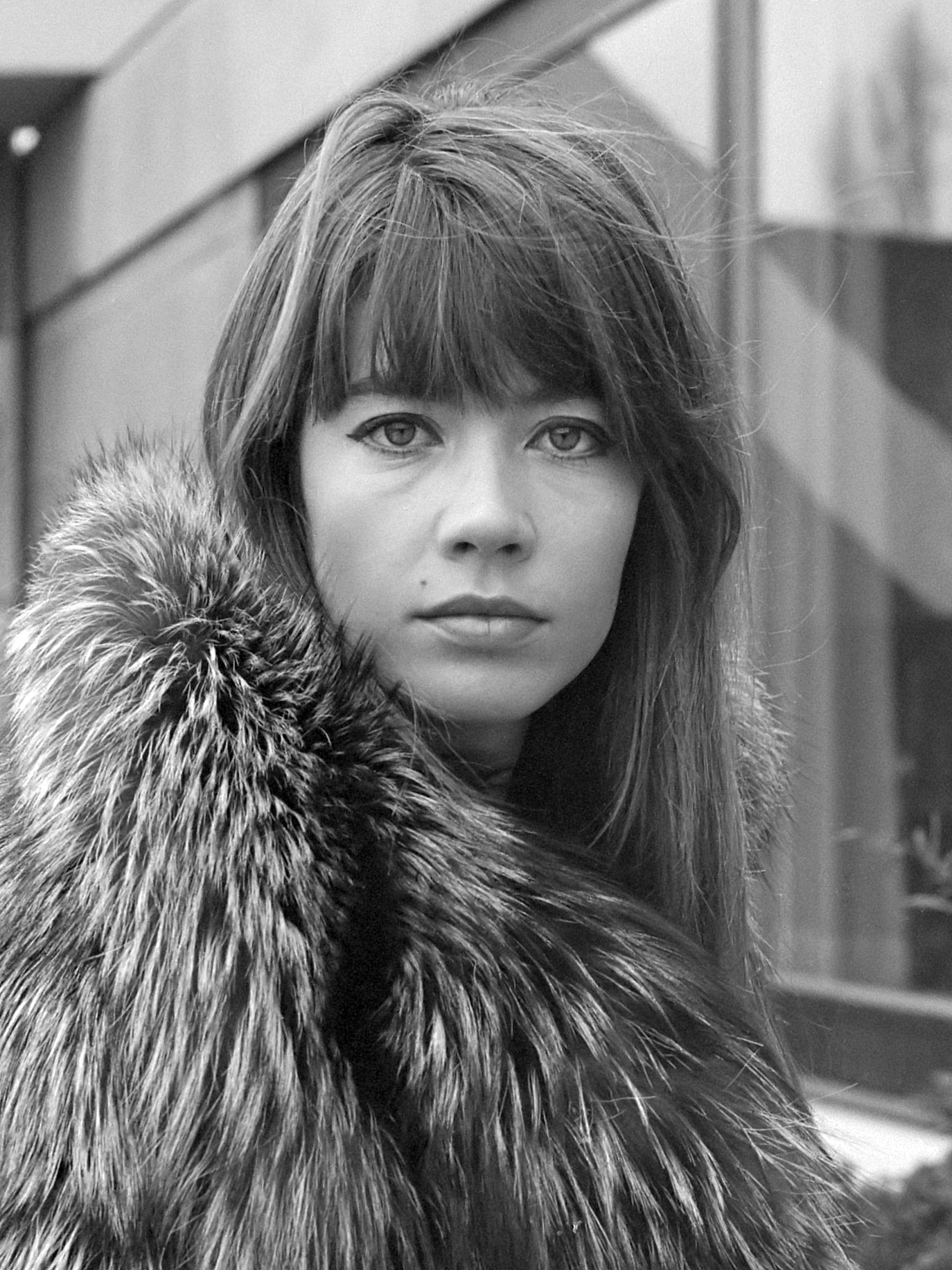
Hardy in Amsterdam, December 1969

In 1970, she broke with the label and signed a three-year contract with Sonopresse, a subsidiary of Hachette. She also created a new production company called Hypopotam and founded her own music publishing company, Kundalini. Hardy received large advances from Sonopresse, which allowed her to finance her own projects. She described this period as "the happiest time", as she was now able to work independently on her music. This transitional period in her career began with the 1970 releases of several compilation albums, including the French Françoise, as well as the studio albums One-Nine-Seven-Zero, recorded in English, and Träume, her last German-language release.

Her first French studio album produced under Hypopotam, Soleil, was released in the spring of 1970. It featured numerous arrangers, including Bernard Estardy, Jean-Claude Vannier, Jean-Pierre Sabar, Mick Jones, Saint-Preux, Simon Napier-Bell, and Tommy Brown from Nero and the Gladiators. In the summer of 1970, Hardy released her penultimate Italian-language single, "Lungo il mare", written by Giuseppe Torrebruno, Luigi Albertelli and Donato Renzetti. Both this and the next Italian single, which included translated versions of "Soleil" ("Sole ti amo") and "Le crabe" ("Il granchio"), were unsuccessful. She also recorded in Spanish for the first time, for a single that contained translated versions of "Soleil" ("Sol") and "J'ai coupé le téléphone" ("Corté el teléfono"). In the spring of 1971, Hardy released singer-songwriter Patrick Dewaere's single "T'es pas poli", having been impressed by his performances at the Café de la Gare in Paris. Dewaere and Hardy performed the song on several television shows to promote it, but it was not a success.

In 1970 Hardy met Tuca (Valeniza Zagni da Silva), a Brazilian singer and guitarist based in Paris, and they became close friends. Hardy made an album with Tuca after attending the Festival Internacional da Canção in Rio de Janeiro and discovering the music of Brazil This was the first time in her career that she had worked on material with another songwriter before going into the studio. She also participated in choosing the string arrangements. The resulting album, La question, was released on 16 October 1971 and was promoted with the singles "Le martien", "Même sous la pluie" and "Rêve". Although acclaimed by the French press, the album was not a success.

Following the poor commercial performance of La question, Hardy moved towards a different sound and enlisted British arranger Tony Cox to produce her next album. Known as Et si je m'en vais avant toi, L'éclairage, or, in reference to its cover, "The Orange Album", the record was released in November 1972 and promoted through the single "La berlue" (released earlier in June). After finishing Et si je m'en vais avant toi, Hardy and Cox recorded the English-language album If You Listen, which included cover versions of little-known American and British songs. When Hardy's contract with Sonopresse expired, it was not renewed.

Around 1972, Hardy recruited songwriter and producer Michel Berger after being impressed by his work with Véronique Sanson He wrote two of the record's twelve songs, "Message personnel" and "Première rencontre", and found the other ten, although Hardy felt they were weak. After a period of artistic independence, she again found herself working under the hectic schedule of a demanding producer. She later described Berger as "a man in a hurry, with a thousand things to do, a thousand things to think about, a thousand people to see". Recording sessions for the album took place in July 1973, soon after Hardy had given birth to her son Thomas Dutronc. Message personnel was released that year on Warner Bros. Records, with whom Hardy signed a three-year contract, and was a commercial and critical success. Its title track reignited the singer's career in France. She promoted the album with appearances on French TV shows, including Dimanche Salvador, Sports en fête, Top à, La Une est à vous, Midi trente, Minuit chez vous, Tempo, Averty's Follies, and Domino.

Hardy wrote ten songs with a common theme for the next album, and her friend Catherine Lara put the words to music. She also worked with Jean-Pierre Castelain and Gérard Kawczynski (with whom she had worked on Message personnel), André Georget, and Michel Sivy. Produced by Hughes de Courson, the concept album Entr'acte was released in November 1974 and promoted through the songs "Ce soir", "Je te cherche", and "Il y a eu des nuits". It was a commercial failure and Hardy took a break from music to devote more time to raising her child. She released two singles in 1975-76. The first was Jean-Michel Jarre's "Que vas-tu faire?", backed by "Le compte à rebours" which sold poorly. The second was "Femme parmi les femmes", the theme song of Claude Lelouch's film Si c'était à refaire, featuring lyrics by Pierre Barouh and music by Francis Lai.

Around 1976, Berger contacted Hardy again, wanting to sign her to his new record label, Apache, and she sent him the songs "Ton enfance", "Star", and "L'impasse". Berger proposed to release an album of her songs with compositions structured around a unifying concept, but Hardy declined and signed a three-year deal with Pathé-Marconi.

=== 1977–1995: Work with Gabriel Yared and hiatus ===
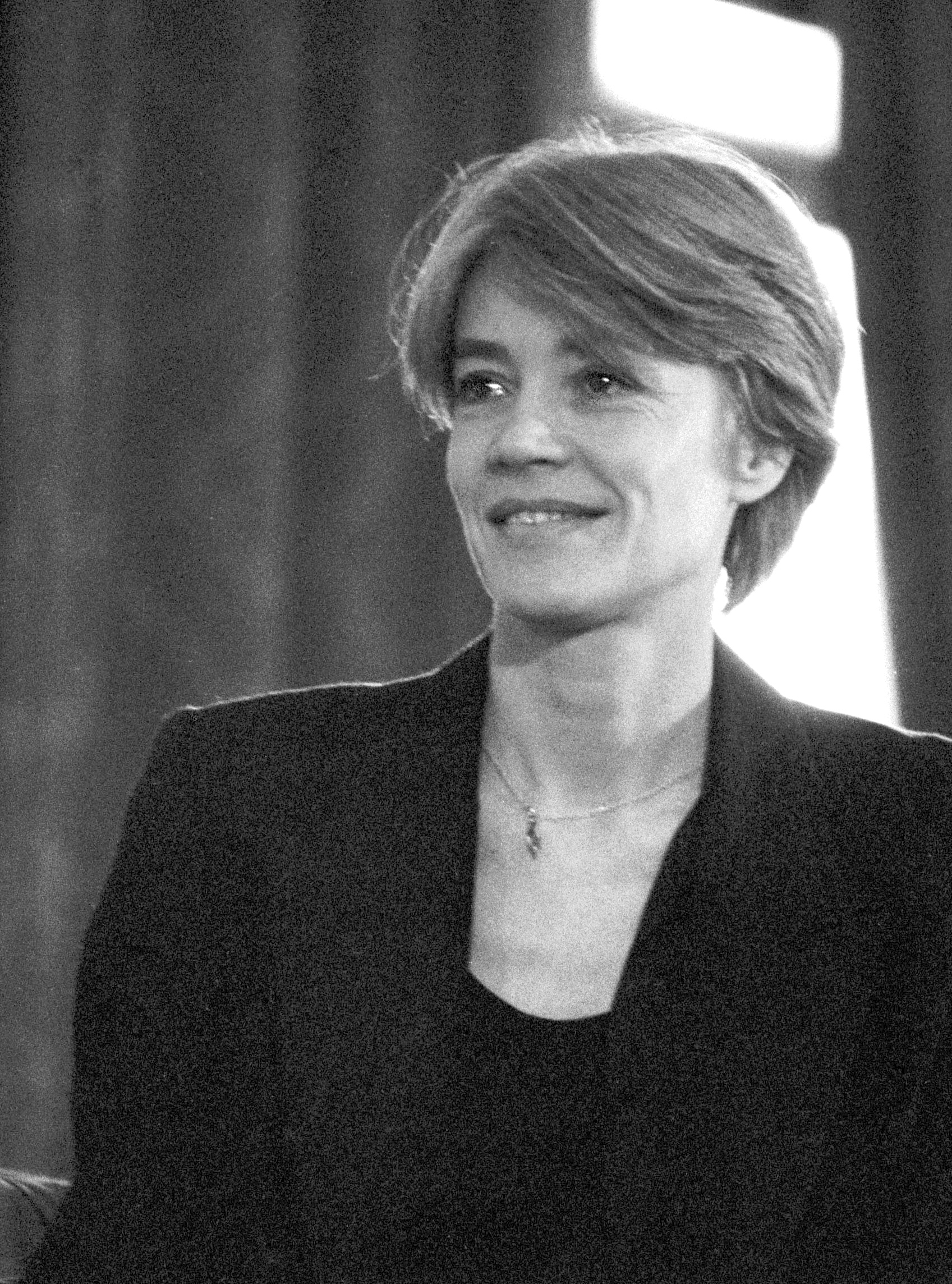
Hardy in Deauville, Normandy, July 1992

For 1977's Star, her first album released under Pathé-Marconi, Hardy enlisted Gabriel Yared as producer and arranger. The "patchwork album" contained six tracks written by Hardy and songs written by Serge Gainsbourg, William Sheller, Catherine Lara, Luc Plamondon, Roland Vincent, and Michel Jonasz. At first Hardy's relationship with Yared was tense and Star was recorded under a "strained atmosphere", earning her the nickname "ice queen". According to Frédéric Quinonero, "the singer deemed it necessary to immediately dispel any misunderstanding, physical or sentimental, before being integrated into a faithful friendship." Star was a commercial success that put Hardy back in the media spotlight and introduced her work to a new generation of young people. Despite their stiff relationship in the recording studio, Hardy and Yared continued to work together for nearly six years and recorded five albums. In 1991, the singer recalled her experience of working with the producer:

[Yared] is demanding... in work as in friendship. He had great influence over me. The five albums we made together were not easy... but I consider that it was one of the great chances of my life to find myself again under the guidance of a musician of this dimension.

Hardy's 1978 follow-up, Musique saoûle, included compositions by Yared, Alain Goldstein and Michel Jonasz. The album changed Hardy's musical direction to a more danceable sound and it was a commercial success, aided by the popularity of the lead single "J'écoute de la musique saoûle", especially in its extended remixed version. Musique saoûle was promoted through televised appearances which showed the singer "awkwardly" performing the track amid a dancing crowd. In 1980, Yared and collaborator Bernard Ilous gave her next album, Gin Tonic, an even more commercial style. The album cover, photographed by a collaborator from Façade, a French magazine modelled after Andy Warhol's journal Influence, projected a "furiously modern" image of the singer and Gin Tonic was promoted with the singles "Jazzy rétro Satanas" and "Juke-box". Hardy's next album, À suivre, was released in April 1981 on the Flarenasch label, in breach of her contract with Pathé-Marconi, and featured a new array of collaborators, with Yared enlisting composers Louis Chedid, Pierre Groscolas, Jean-Claude Vannier, Michel Bernholc, Daniel Perreau, Jean-Pierre Bourtayre, and Étienne Roda-Gil. À suivre was promoted through the singles "Tamalou" and "Villégiature". The next album, Quelqu'un qui s'en va, was released in the spring of 1981 and featured a cover photographed by Serge Gainsbourg. Décalages, released on 2 May 1988, was promoted as Hardy's final album. It was a commercial success and certified gold for selling 100,000 copies.

In 1990, Hardy wrote "Fais-moi une place" for Julien Clerc, and the song was included on his album of the same name. Hardy resumed her music career in the 1990s, signing a contract with Virgin Records in December 1994. In 1995 Hardy collaborated with English band Blur for the French version of "To the End", recorded at Abbey Road Studios. It was included as a B-side to band's single "Country House".

=== 1996–2021: Final albums and retirement ===
In 1997, Hardy collaborated with French duo Air on the track "Jeanne", a B-side on their maxi-single "Sexy Boy".

In 2005, Hardy received the 'Female Artist of the Year' award for her album Tant de belles choses at the Victoires de la Musique. In 2006, she received the Grande médaille de la chanson française award, given by the Académie Française in recognition of her music career.

In 2012 Hardy celebrated her 50th anniversary in music with the release of her first novel and an album, both titled L'Amour fou. Recently diagnosed with laryngeal cancer, the singer declared L'Amour fou to be her last album, but returned nearly five years later with the 2018 release Personne d'autre.

In March 2021, Hardy announced that she could no longer sing as a result of her cancer treatments.

== Acting career ==
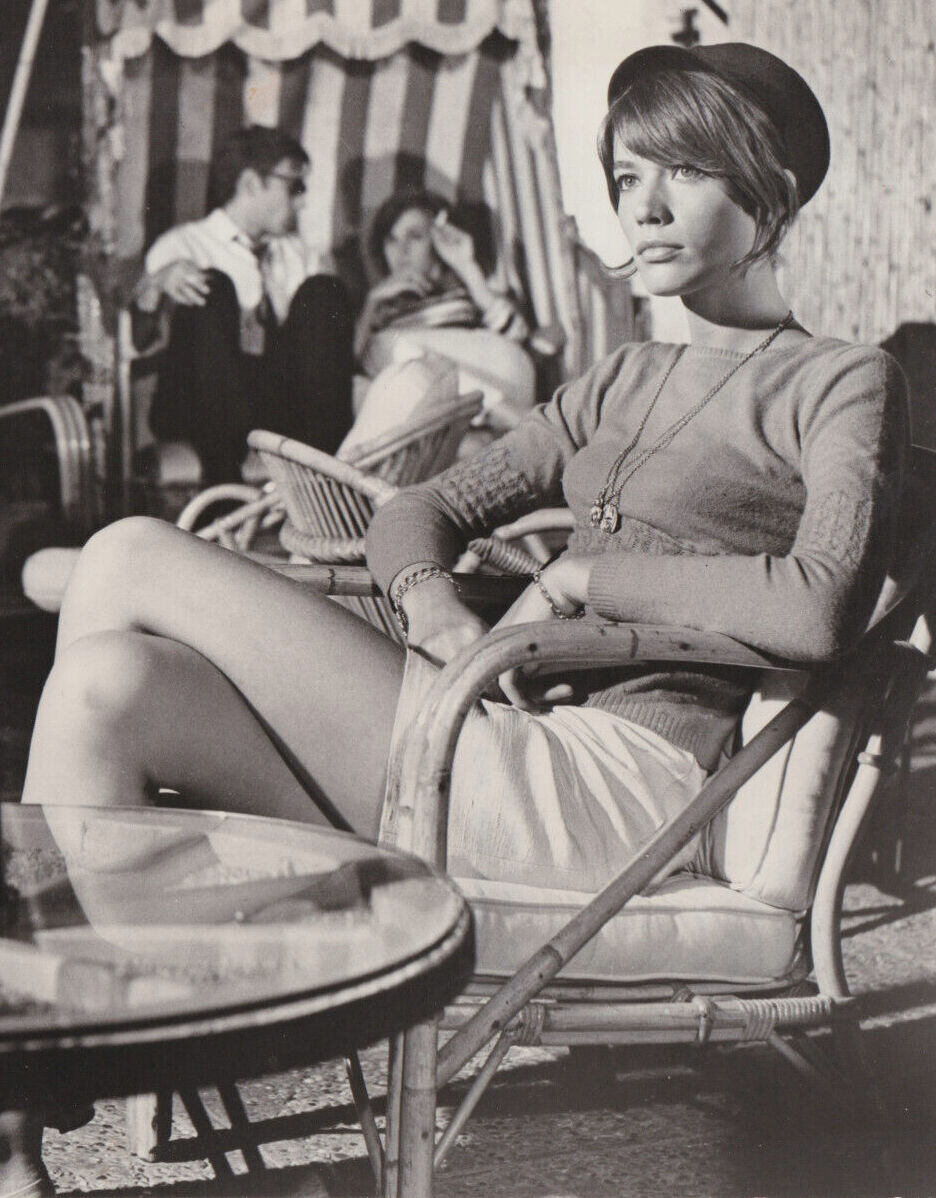
Hardy playing as Lisa in the 1966 film Grand Prix

Hardy had film roles but did not pursue a serious career as an actress and did not wish to. She reluctantly accepted acting work offered to her in the 1960s on the advice of Jean-Marie Périer. While she liked the idea of working with well-known film directors, she still preferred music over cinema.

In 1963 Hardy made her film debut as Ophelia in Roger Vadim's Château en Suède. Before casting her, Vadim tested Hardy's acting abilities by directing her in a reading of Cécile de Roggendorf's love letters to Giacomo Casanova. During the making of Château en Suède, Vadim mocked Hardy for her "infinite apathy", which marked the "beginning of her dread for filming sessions and the movie business in general". As promotion for the film Hardy attended the Cannes Film Festival, where she wore a black coat by Pierre Cardin.

After a cameo in What's New Pussycat?, Hardy landed a role in Jean-Daniel Pollet's 1966 film Une balle au cœur, which was shot on location on a remote Greek island. She disliked the experience, saying, "after a day or two, I realised that the director was hopelessly bad and his film was a disaster." Building on her music career success in Italy, Hardy made appearances as a performer in musicarelli films, including I ragazzi dell'Hully Gully (1964), Questo pazzo, pazzo mondo della canzone (1965), Altissima pressione (1965), and Europa canta (1965). She appeared in the 1968 television special Monte Carlo: C'est La Rose, hosted by Grace Kelly.

The American director John Frankenheimer spotted Hardy as she was leaving a London club and thought she would be perfect in his Formula One film Grand Prix (1966). Despite remaining uninterested in an acting career, Hardy accepted the role because it was well-paid. She made a cameo in Jean-Luc Godard's 1966 film Masculin féminin wearing a head-to-toe look by André Courrèges. In 1969 she starred in the television film L'homme qui venait du Cher alongside Eddy Mitchell. In the 1970s, she made brief appearances in Jean-Claude Lord's The Doves (Les Colombes) (1972) and Claude Lelouch's If I Had to Do It All Over Again (Si c'était à refaire) (1976).

== Astrological career ==
I believe this human science is restricted to offering information on one of the many factors that conditions our lives, the one connected with the rhythms of our solar system. It simply allows us to get our bearings and identify as best we can the various phases of our development, which are dependent on many more factors than just planetary cycles and configurations, and does not necessarily translate into terms of particular events and outcomes.

— Hardy on her distrust of most astrologers and of "predictive astrology", 2008.

Hardy also developed a career as an astrologer, having written extensively on the subject. She aligned herself with the so-called "conditionalist" school of thought, outlined by Jean-Pierre Nicola in his 1964 book, La condition solaire, which proposed a non-divinatory character for the discipline and said that it should be used while taking into account other factors such as hereditary, educational, and socio-cultural determinants.

Hardy first became interested in the subject after consulting astrologer André Barbault in the mid-1960s. She took public courses, learned to draw up a birth chart and read many specialized books before meeting Catherine Aubier, who recommended her teacher to Hardy. Hardy was taught traditional astrology for two years by Madame Godefroy in Paris. She became more dedicated to astrology after meeting Nicola in 1974, who asked her to be part of a new magazine he was developing. The singer described Nicola as "the best astrologer in the world" and wrote: "[he] initiated me into an intelligent understanding of astrology and trained me to use it, by his side, to the best of my ability." Besides astrology, Hardy was initiated into the reading of the Tarot of Marseilles by Alejandro Jodorowsky. As a complement to her astrological knowledge, she also took courses with graphologist Germaine Tripier, the dean of the French Society of Graphology.

Between recording sessions for her album Gin Tonic in 1979, Hardy collaborated on a book series on the zodiac signs by Tchou Editions, and worked on the book dedicated to Virgo with fellow astrologer Béatrice Guénin. She also collaborated with the magazine Quinze Ans. In late 1980, Hardy was asked by Pierre Lescure of the RMC radio station to provide the daily horoscope and a weekly show. In 1982 Hardy began a new weekly broadcast, titled Entre les lignes, entre les signes, in which she interviewed a film or music figure using their birth chart, and graphologist Anne-Marie Simmond, whose courses Hardy had taken, drew up a psychological portrait using their handwriting. A compilation of the interviews and profiles was published by RMC in 1986.

In 1990, Hardy continued her astrological work by writing articles in Swiss newspaper Le Matin and by hosting a weekly section in Thierry Ardisson's program Télé Zèbre on Antenne 2. On 7 May 2003, Hardy published Les rythmes du zodiaque, which had taken over two years to write and which she intended to be "a book that would allow me to make my little contribution to modern astrology".

== Writing career ==
In her later years, Hardy wrote fiction and non-fiction. She also wrote an autobiography, Le désespoir des singes... et autres bagatelles (The Despair of Monkeys and Other Trifles), which was published on 9 October 2008. It sold 250,000 copies and became a bestseller in France. The book was translated and published in Spanish by the San Sebastián-based independent publisher Expediciones Polares in 2017. An English-language edition, translated by Jon E. Graham, was published by Feral House in 2018.

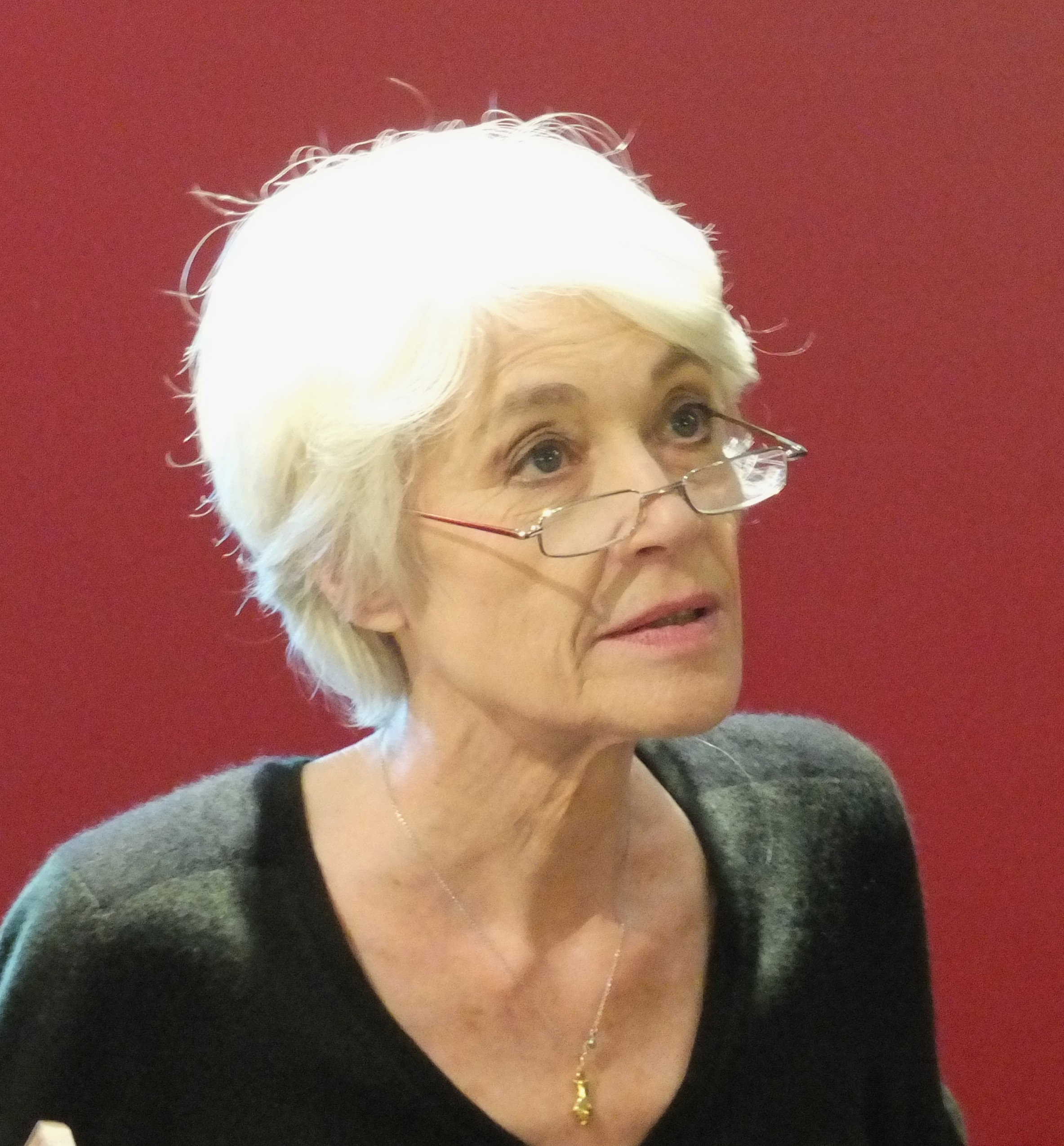
Hardy presenting her first novel L'amour fou in Paris, November 2012

In 2012 Hardy published her first novel, L'amour fou, on Éditions Albin Michel. It was released alongside a music album of the same name. She had begun working on the story, which dealt with an obsessive romantic relationship, thirty years before but had shelved the manuscript and had not intended to release it. She was urged to do so by her editor and agreed after being encouraged by her friend, Jean-Marie Périer. Hardy felt it was appropriate to publish the book to mark the fiftieth year of her musical career, as it told "the story that has been the matrix of almost all of my lyrics from the start". In 2013 an Italian-language edition of the novel was released by Florence's Edizioni Clichy.

Following poor sales of the albums La pluie sans parapluie and L'Amour fou, Hardy decided to distance herself from music and dedicate herself to writing. This resulted in the essay Avis non autorisés (Unauthorised Opinions), released in 2015 on Éditions des Équateurs, in which she described the difficulties of reaching old age. In this book she also shared views on current affairs which were deemed "politically incorrect". Avis non autorisés was a commercial success. A year later, she published Un cadeau du ciel (A Present from Heaven), in which she reflected on her hospitalization in March 2015 for cancer during which she nearly died. In the early 2020s, after being unable to continue singing, and claiming that she had "nothing else to do", Hardy dedicated herself assembling a song book, Chansons sur toi et nous, a compilation of all of her lyrics with commentaries. Chansons sur toi et nous was published in 2021 on Éditions des Équateurs.

== Artistry ==
=== Musical style ===
The inspiration for my lyrics came, in part, from my anxieties. In many songs, I have mentioned my fear of not being up to the task and of being left for a woman a priori a thousand times more interesting and more attractive than me. A fear that is not necessarily unfounded...

— Hardy, L'Express, 2013.

Although Hardy's music covered a wide range of genres, she maintained a signature sound from the beginning of her career which was defined by breathy alto vocals and a predilection for melancholic songs. Rock & Folk's Basile Farkas described her as the "queen of melancholy", and Hardy herself stated in 2012: "In music, I like above all the slow, sad melodies... Not in a way that plunges, but in a way that uplifts... I still aspire to find the heartbreaking melody that will bring tears to my eyes. A melody whose quality gives it a sacred dimension." Cosette Schulz of Exclaim! described her as a "master of crafting simple but stellar tracks". Writers have likened Hardy's music to that of English singer Marianne Faithfull. Comparing both singers, The Guardian's Keith Altham wrote in 2014: "They both sing sad songs with a simple folksy style. They both have the same shy, wistful, almost waif-like appeal about them. They both have a dramatic, 'all-alone' quality about their voices which commands sympathy and attention."

Aside from original compositions, much of her 1960s repertoire consisted of versions of foreign artists that spanned a wide range of styles, including American girl-groups, early rockabilly, pre-Beatles British rock and roll, country music, folk, folk-rock and, to a lesser extent, doo-wop and soul. The recurring themes of her lyrics are sadness, personal pain, heartache, one-sided love, sleeplessness, boredom, loneliness, and confinement. Her deadpan delivery, characterized by its "cool, aloof air", has also been compared to that of German singer Nico.

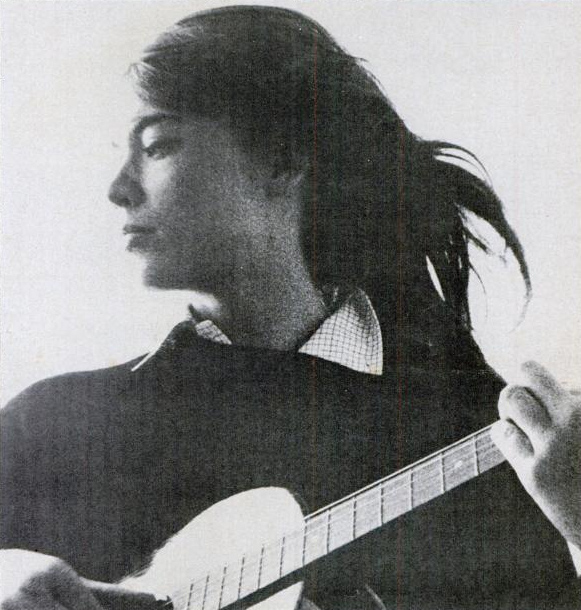
Hardy in 1965

Hardy was known for being meticulous about her music, such as her decision to leave low-quality French studios for higher-quality studios in London. As she matured, Hardy honed her own despairing songwriting, but she also chose from the works of leading professionals. Producer Erick Benzi recalled: "From when she was 18, she knew she was different. She could go in front of big artists like Charles Aznavour and say, 'Your song is crap, I don't want to sing it.' She never made compromises." Tony Cox recalled his experience working with Hardy: "Françoise was good in that she liked things to be slightly more adventurous than the norm. There was a bit of the Left Bank (Note: The "Left Bank" scene—named after the left bank of the Seine—was a subgenre of French chanson that emerged in the 1940s, characterized by its stripped-down sound and "emphasis on poetic craftsmanship".) about her – she's not your average pop singer, that's for sure."

Although she is regarded as one of the greatest exponents of yé-yé, she was different from her peers in that she wrote much of her own material. She was also known for downplaying her skills as a singer and musician. Her compositions became less frequent, as she told Rock & Folk in 2018: "I understood that even if I did learn things, I would never be able to do as well as real melodists. That's why I thought it was best to bring in musicians whose work touched me."

=== Influences ===
Her earliest musical tastes were French chanson singers, including Cora Vaucaire, Georges Guétary, Charles Trenet, and Jacques Brel, since in the 1950s this was the only music played on the radio. She said that Trenet touched her more than the others because his music was "sad and light". Hardy was also a big fan of singer and songwriter Barbara, who had inspired her to write her own compositions. In the early 1960s, she was introduced to English-language rock and roll and Brill Building pop through Radio Luxembourg and took inspiration from artists such as Brenda Lee, the Everly Brothers, the Shadows, Cliff Richard, Neil Sedaka, Connie Francis, and especially Elvis Presley and Paul Anka. Hardy said she was "completely spellbound" by these young foreign artists and began to sing and play the guitar to try to imitate them. She recalled in 2008: "I immediately identified with them, because they expressed teenage loneliness and awkwardness, over melodies that were much more inspiring than their lyrics".

Hardy's music during the second half of the decade incorporated influences from the British Invasion pop phenomenon and "a strong comeback of the traditional values of French chanson, neither yé-yé nor 'Left Bank', but rather romantic". Her 1964 album Mon amie la rose incorporated influences of Phil Spector's Wall of Sound technique, as well as Italian composer Ennio Morricone. Brazilian guitarist and arranger Tuca, introduced Hardy to bossa nova, which culminated to the 1971 album La Question.

Hardy was an admirer of English folk singer-songwriter Nick Drake. She recalled: "For me, he didn't belong to a particularly British tradition... It is the soul which comes out of his songs that touched me deeply – romantic, poetic... but also the refined melodies. As well as the very individual timbre of his voice, which adds to the melancholy of the whole thing." Their personalities, voices, and tastes in chords and harmony were perceived to be similar.

In 1972, Véronique Sanson's debut album impressed Hardy, who began to feel her own music was outdated. She described her impression of Sanson in her autobiography: "It was as if the English and American influences that yé-yé had been happy to simply copy... had been thoroughly digested and allowed for the emergence of something much more musically mature, as well as more personal." Hardy's 1996 album Le danger incorporated influences from English band Portishead and the grunge, Britpop, and roots rock genres.

=== Development ===
==== 1962–1967 ====
"J'suis d'accord" (1962)
Hardy's debut studio album Tous les garçons et les filles, framed within the yé-yé genre, is noted for its rockabilly-tinged, minimalist sound. The singer repeatedly expressed dissatisfaction with the production of her early work.

"La maison où j'ai grandi" (1966)
Starting in the mid-1960s, Hardy moved to London to record several albums, among them La maison où j'ai grandi. This resulted in lusher and more complex productions, progressively abandoning the influences of rock music to explore the baroque pop style and incorporate Phil Spector's Wall of Sound technique.

Hardy's rockabilly-tinged, full-length debut album Tous les garçons et les filles was her closest to the yé-yé genre. The album was noted for its simple, minimalist accompaniment of acoustic and electric guitar, bass, and jazz-influenced percussion. Her next album, Le premier bonheur du jour, incorporated more complex instrumentation and lyricism, with electric organs and "weeping" string arrangements and included compositions inspired by jazz music and American girl groups such as the Crystals and the Ronettes.

In the mid-1960s, her music became lusher and richer after she moved to London to record with arranger Charles Blackwell, who allowed her to "reach new levels of sophistication." The album Mon amie la rose, released in 1964, revealed a growing complexity in her music, with stronger vocals and increased experimentation in song structure. Hardy's 1965-66 output showed her style maturing, with productions that "moved from the tinny sound of yeh-yeh pop into a fuller brand of rock arrangements." The overall sound of her follow-up album, L'amitié, was considerably more expansive. According to Pitchfork's Hazel Cills: "It wasn't until her fifth record, La maison où j'ai grandi, that Hardy grew into a more grown-up, baroque sound, one that matched the depth of her sorrow and its complexities." Warfield considered that this was the album in which she had "really settled into her sound, giving us a glimpse of the performer we can still recognise as a 70-year-old". With Ma jeunesse fout le camp, her last 1960s album recorded in London, she "moved toward a more adult, sedate form of orchestrated pop balladry" which has been described as "her farewell to the yé-yé years".

==== 1968–1974 ====
"Bâti mon nid" (1971)
Considered an important turning point in Hardy's career, cult album La question introduced a more personal and less commercial sound. Working with Brazilian musician Tuca, it is noted for its bossa nova influence, delicate production, and sensual tone.

"Première rencontre" (1973)
Admiring his work with Veronique Sanson, Hardy worked with producer Michel Berger on the 1973 album Message personnel, noted for its mature style. Berger ushered in a new wave of French variétés, (Note: In music journalism, the term "variétés"—also known as "French variety"— is used to differentiate the majority of French popular music from rock and the "more serious" chanson genre.) is characterised by the influence of English-language pop music, the incorporation of classical music elements, and its singular, rhythmic phrasing.

With Hardy's return to French recording studios 1968's Comment te dire adieu was more MOR-oriented than her previous releases. Richie Unterberger considered its music to be "perhaps even sadder and more sentimental" than usual. As the yé-yé era faded away following the May 68 protests in France, Hardy "reinvented herself as an elusive folk-rock/jazz chanteuse" with her early 1970s releases. She developed a more mature, less-pop oriented style to reflect more of her inner. Described as "the first truly personal Françoise Hardy record", the 1971 album La question, moving toward a less commercial sound with no apparent hooks, was regarded as an important turning point in her career. It was one of her sparsest efforts, with subdued and acoustic-flavored arrangements featuring guitar, touches of bass and subtle orchestration. Hardy's vocals have been described as "sultry" and "breathy", at times "[substituting] melodic humming in the place of singing, wordlessly articulating the emotional essence of the song." La question was also first time that Hardy had a part in choosing the string arrangements for her work.

Following La question, Hardy moved toward a more folk- and rock-influenced sound. This led producer Joe Boyd to suggest that Nick Drake write an album of songs for Hardy, to be produced by Tony Cox. The two singers met several times, including a visit by Drake to Hardy's recording sessions in London, but the project was never carried out. Cox was keen to work with Hardy, and in late 1971 recorded If You Listen, which featured a "crack team" of British folk-rock musicians. Influenced by Drake, the album featured "cinematic" arrangements that emphasized acoustic guitar and light strings. In the same year, Hardy released Et si je m'en vais avant toi, which incorporated influences from American blues, folk, and rock music and featured, unusually, a slightly humorous tone and catchier rhythms.

Hardy enlisted Michel Berger, the producer of Véronique Sanson's debut album, to oversee production of her 1973 album Message personnel. The album featured arrangements by Michel Bernholc, who directed "a basic rock band backed by a lush set of strings, [underlining] Hardy's wispy yet compelling vocals." The album had a sad, introspective mood and "classy, adult tone". The 1974 release Entr'acte was Hardy's first attempt at a concept album, with lyrics that narrated "the successive phases of a one-night stand between a stranger and a young woman, who, abandoned by the man she loves, is looking to give him a taste of his own medicine." It featured orchestral arrangements by Del Newman, who had recently worked on Elton John's Goodbye Yellow Brick Road and Cat Stevens' Tea for the Tillerman.

==== 1975–2018 ====
1977's Star, a jazz-oriented pop record, was Hardy's first album to be arranged by Gabriel Yared, who produced her output for the next ten years. In 1978, as disco dominated the music industry, Yared sought to adapt her sound to the era with the release of Musique saoûle, which incorporated rhythms influenced by funk music. The singer said later that she had felt uncomfortable and embarrassed when singing over dance rhythms. The 1988 album Décalages, noted for its layered, atmospheric sound, incorporated the use of a Synclavier synthesizer, despite the singer's wishes to avoid fashionable digital sounds in favor of an acoustic style.

In 1996, inspired by the alternative rock scene, Hardy veered into an assertive, guitar-oriented, modern rock style with Le danger, her first album in seven years. Pitchfork's Jazz Monroe described its music as "adult-contemporary space rock". The album's harsh sound and lyrics reflect the "very dark" period the singer was in at the time. The commercial failure of Le danger, among other reasons, caused Hardy to return to her earlier soft and light style for the next album, Clair-obscur, released in 2000, and her final five albums were characterised by an elegant and melancholic sound. 2006's (Parenthèses...) was a collection of twelve duets with production that kept tricks and slick mixing to a minimum, drawing comparisons to previous uncluttered releases such as La question.

Compared to previous albums, 2010's La pluie sans parapluie featured a "sunnier" sound, with some songs driven by a rhythm track of drums and bass rather than piano or strings. Her 2012 album L'amour fou featured half-sung, half-spoken vocals and had a "resigned, philosophical" mood, with "classy" pianos, minor chords and brushed drums as backing. The lyrics of her last album, Personne d'autre, released in 2018, dealt with her advancing years and her own mortality. She had survived a major health crisis since the release of her previous record, and the vocal performances on the album were affected by her illness. The dark, lyrical subject matter of Personne d'autre contrasted with the singer's earlier delicate and intimate sound.

== Live performances ==
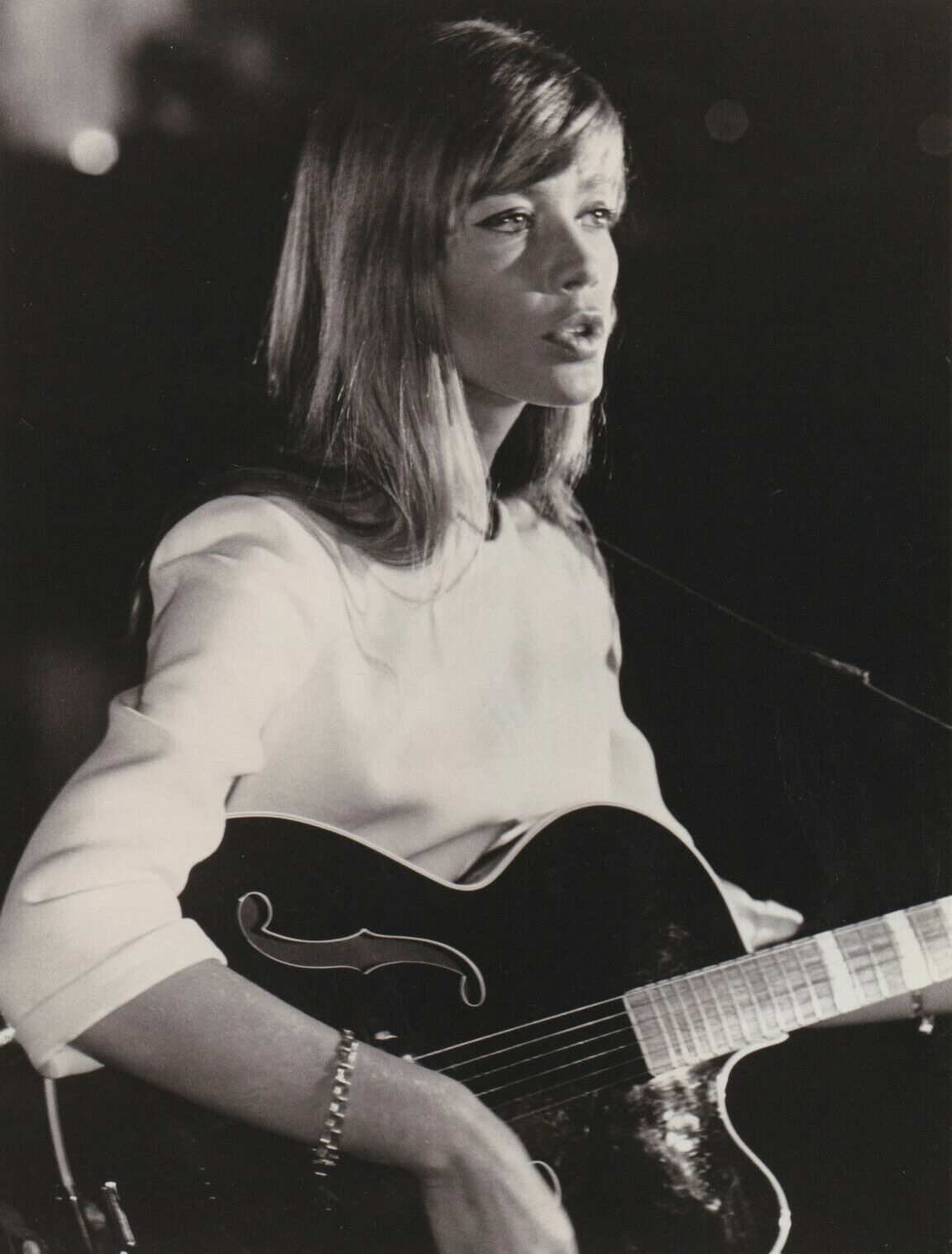
Hardy performing in 1968

On 11 May 1962, Hardy made her debut as a live performer alongside other young singers at the Disco Revue gala in Nancy. She performed on Christmas Eve in Brussels and undertook a successful tour in Southern France from late 1962 to early 1963. In February 1963, she appeared on the TV show Cinq colonnes à la une alongside Sylvie Vartan and Sheila. They were later considered to be the three biggest idols of the yé-yé era, each one embodying a different modern girl archetype. She made her first appearance at the Olympia concert venue in Paris, where she opened for Richard Anthony. Between 26 February and 10 April, Hardy took part in the Gala des Stars concert tour, sponsored by Europe n° 1 and Salut les copains.

Between tour dates she represented Monaco at the Eurovision Song Contest in London, singing "L'amour s'en va", and finished fifth with 25 points in a tie with France's Alain Barrière. Between 7 November and 18 December 1963, Hardy appeared again as Anthony's opening act at the Olympia in Paris and was well received by the press, who had previously criticized her stiff live performances. On 11 October, Hardy performed in Barcelona, Spain, as part of the fourth Great Gala of the Sedería Española. In November, she embarked on her first Italian tour, which mostly visited small coastal towns. The singer was also successful in Portugal and travelled to Lisbon in late 1963 to appear on TV shows.

On 21 February 1964, Hardy promoted "Catch a Falling Star" on the British TV show Ready Steady Go! and on the same show performed "All Around the World". She also played on Ollie and Fred's Five O'Clock Club, Thank Your Lucky Stars, and Top of the Pops. In the United States, Hardy made her first appearance on NBC's program Hullabaloo, where she performed "However Much", a bilingual version of Charles Trenet's "Que reste-t-il de nos amours ?", and a rendition of "The Girl from Ipanema".

Hardy became famous overnight in Germany after her 28 April 1965 television appearance in Portrait in Musik, a series of staged musical performances directed by Truck Branss. Pressured by her French and Italian record companies, Hardy took part in the Sanremo Music Festival 1966, where she reached the finals with the Edoardo Vianello-penned song "Parlami di te".

Hardy gave her last three live performances in Kinshasa, Congo, in June 1967. She suffered from stage fright, which led to her quitting live performances altogether in 1968.

== Public image ==
=== Personality ===
As a public figure, Hardy was renowned for her shyness and reservedness, and observers have emphasized her "anti-social nature as a celebrity". She was open in her autobiography and in interviews about her struggles with anxiety, self-doubt, loneliness and inferiority complex. Uncut's Tom Pinnock noted that "it was her refusal to play the showbusiness game that made her something of an icon." The singer's sudden celebrity status was a source of great discomfort for her, as she claimed in 2011: "I didn't enjoy at all everything, the trappings, when all of a sudden you become very famous. (...) [Being taken up by fashion houses] was work, things I had to do, a chore—I didn't enjoy it at all... It is quite impossible to stand—to be admired too much—it is not a normal situation. I don't like that at all. I am not comfortable with my professional life really, so the word 'icon'—it's as though you were talking about someone else, it's not me really." She was also disenchanted with the jet-set and high society lifestyle.

=== Fashion trend-setter ===
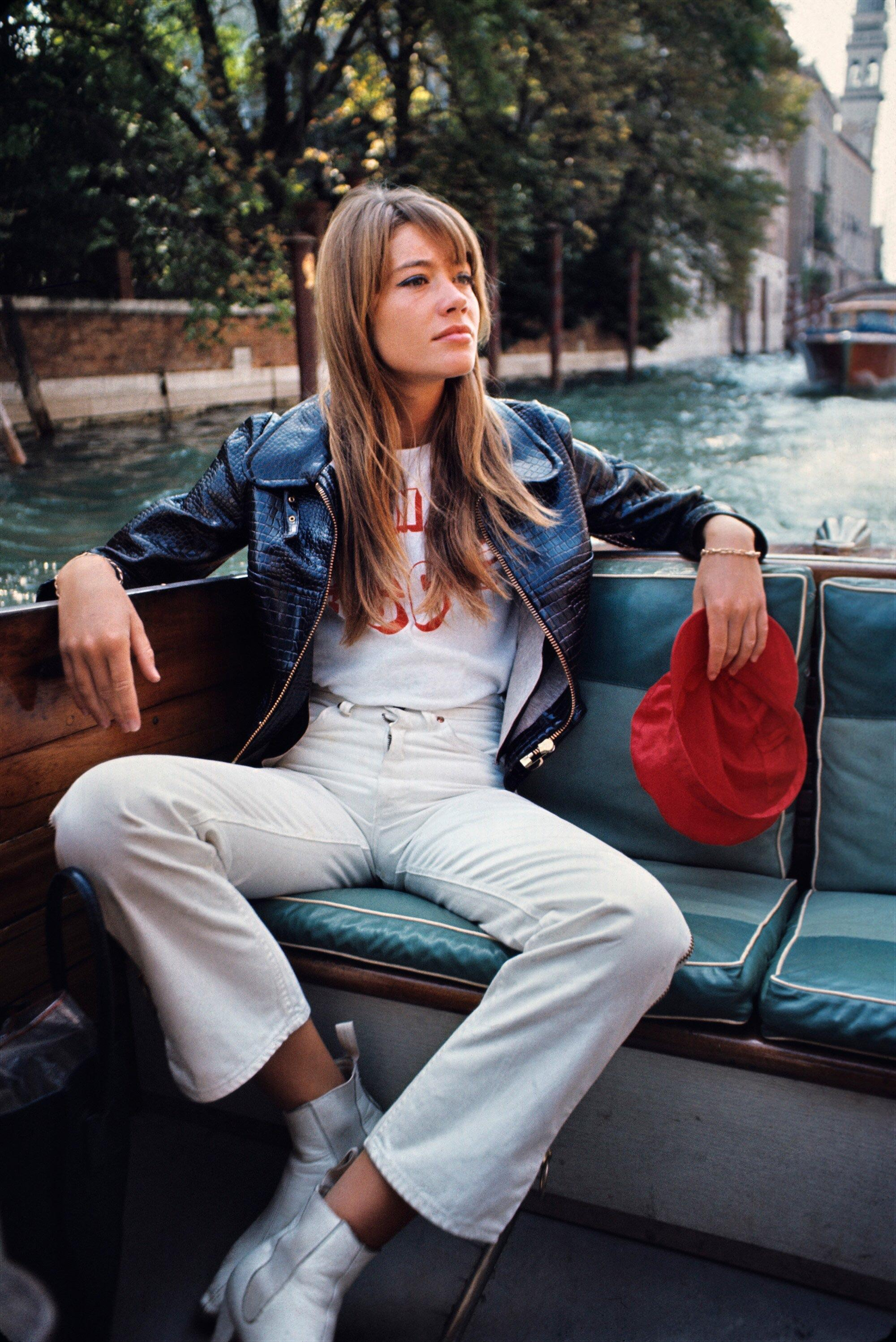
Hardy (pictured in Venice in 1966) with her fringe hairstyle and white boots, considered to be her signature look.

As Hardy's almost exclusive photographer and agent during the decade, Jean-Marie Périer became a Pygmalion-like figure for her, and transformed the singer's public image from "a shy, gauche-looking schoolgirl" into a "modern young trend-setter." She wrote: "...[Périer] tried to open my mind and help me in all domains with his characteristic generosity... under his tutelage I realized the importance of aesthetics, which became one of my major criteria. He taught me how to carry myself and to dress, and gave me advice on social skills". He persuaded the singer to begin modelling and she soon became "a star of the international fashion world as well as the French music scene." She was photographed by Gered Mankowitz, William Klein and Richard Avedon for Vogue and other publications. Her regular appearance on magazine covers gave her a reputation of being the quintessential French cover girl of the 1960s. In 1968, Hardy told a reporter that: "If it weren't for the way I dress, no one would notice me". Likewise, she told Vanity Fair in 2018: "My songs had little interest compared to the Anglo-Saxon production. So I took it to heart to dress well every time I went to London or New York. I was above all a fashion ambassador."

As an "it girl" and fashion leader, Hardy was considered the epitome of "the 'Modern Woman'" and of 1960s French chic and cool, known for her avant-garde and futuristic fashion choices. Brett Marie of PopMatters noted that "her sense of style and '60s-era model figure made her as much an icon of fashion as a music-business star." She recalled in 2008 that at the start of the 1960s, her slender build which had made her self-conscious suddenly became fashionable. She began to be regarded as an "égérie" 'muse' by top French fashion designers of the time, including André Courrèges, Chanel and Yves Saint Laurent. Hardy championed the first incarnation of Saint-Laurent's rupturist 1966 design Le Smoking, and the designer recalled that when he took her to the Paris Opera dressed in one of his tuxedos, "People screamed and hollered. It was an outrage".

Hardy was an early fan of Paco Rabanne, helping make the Spanish designer popular by wearing his creations in photoshoots and television performances. In 1968, she modeled a plated mini-dress made of pure gold at the International Diamond Fair. Made out of 1,000 gold plaques, 300 carats of diamonds, and weighing 20 pounds, it was considered to be "the most expensive dress in the world in 1968". Rabanne's designs, including the gold dress, would become some of Hardy's most famous looks.

Hardy modelled creations of the nascent prêt-à-porter industry, a new wave of French female designers known as the "yé-yé school" or "the stylistes", who rebelled against the "strictures of haute couture". She helped to launch the career of Sonia Rykiel by wearing her influential "poor boy sweater" on the cover of Elle, and was photographed by David Bailey wearing Emmanuelle Khanh's color-blocking coat for Vogue. Fashion Institute of Technology's Colleen Hill considered Hardy's style to be the most enduring of all the yé-yé girls, noting that "her nonchalance is an important part of her appeal. Hardy's fashion choices, such as her white Courrèges pantsuits and Yves Saint Laurent's first Le Smoking, were distinctly '60s and streamlined, yet they also have an edge."

Hardy was also known for a pared-down style with discreet hairdos and makeup, often wearing a simple sweater-and-pants combination. Her signature look was defined by her bangs and use of white boots by Courrèges, and she was one of the first people to wear miniskirts. She also experimented with androgynous silhouettes. She was described as the "anti-Bardot", imposing a beauty ideal that "rendered the exaggerated femininity of the sex-kitten of the time old-fashioned". By the 1970s she had abandoned the image of a "fashionable young girl about town" that Périer had created for her.

=== 1960s universal myth ===
Her public image and style during the 1960s made an impact on international pop culture, something that overshadowed her skills as a singer outside of France. In 1967, teen magazine Special Pop wrote: "[Hardy] manages to attract both kids and their parents, men and women alike. More than a singer, she's becoming a universal myth with whom thousands of young girls dream of identifying."

In the second half of the decade, Hardy became known as an inspiring cultural figure and was made a muse by numerous creatives. She was the subject of portraits by artists Michel Bourdais, Bernard Buffet, Gabriel Pasqualini and Jean-Paul Goude. In 1965, Jacques Prévert wrote a poem dedicated to the singer titled Une plante verte, which was read as part of Hardy's performance at the Olympia. She was also the subject of a poem by Manuel Vázquez Montalbán and an open letter by Paul Guth. Belgian illustrator Guy Peellaert used Hardy as a model for the title character of his 1968 pop art and psychedelic-inspired comic Pravda la Survireuse, made in collaboration with French screenwriter Pascal Thomas.

The singer was admired by Spanish artist Salvador Dalí, who invited her to spend a week with him in Cadaqués in 1968. Hardy was also admired in the Swinging London scene and she acknowledged having been a "source of fascination for the English pop musicians". Malcolm McLaren described her as the "utmost of the pinup girl, pinned to the walls of every trendy pop apprentice's bedroom down in Chelsea. Many bands in their prime, like the Beatles or the Stones, dreamt of dating her." Her image fascinated the young David Bowie, Mick Jagger (who described her as his "ideal woman"), Brian Jones, Morrissey, and Richard Thompson.

Bob Dylan was infatuated by Hardy and included a beat poem dedicated to her on the back cover of his 1964 album Another Side of Bob Dylan. It began: "for françoise hardy/at the seine's edge/a giant shadow/of notre dame/seeks t' grab my foot/sorbonne students/whirl by on thin bicycles/swirlin' lifelike colors of leather spin..." In 2018, Hardy told Uncut that she had drafts of the poem that Dylan had left in a café. She said, "... I was very moved. This was a young man, a very romantic artist, who had a fixation on somebody only from a picture. You know how very young people are... I realised it had been very important for him." Hardy and Dylan met in May 1966, behind the scenes of his performance at Olympia. Noticing that Hardy was in the audience, Dylan had refused to go back on stage to perform the second half unless she went to his dressing room. She and other singers later joined Dylan at his suite in the Four Seasons Hotel George V, where he gave her early pressings of "Just Like a Woman" and "I Want You".

=== Political views ===
As a public figure, Hardy was known for her frankness regarding her political views, which have been described as right-wing. She was raised in a Gaullist family and she told Télérama in 2011: "I don't like everything that is said or done on the right, and I don't denigrate everything that is done or said on the left... basically I'm pretty centrist." In her 2008 autobiography, she wrote that she "only identif[ed] with ecology", which she considered "neither right nor left".

While promoting her album Décalages, Hardy was interviewed by the magazine Rockland. The conversation strayed into politics, the 1988 French presidential election having taken place the day before, and believing that an off-the-record discussion would not be included in the final article, Hardy expressed contempt for people on the left. She was outraged when the political part of the interview was published, and defended herself in a televised interview on 13 May with Thierry Ardisson, in which she recounted an altercation with singer Renaud, claiming that he had insulted her for her support of Minister of Culture François Léotard. In the Rockland interview, she commented about racism in France, saying "We do not talk about anti-French racism, that there are places where you are more likely to enter if you are not French", as well as about antisemitism, suggesting that "those who see it everywhere could actually be sowing its seeds." In her autobiography, the singer said she distanced herself from these remarks.

Hardy was an opponent of the solidarity tax on wealth (French: impôt de solidarité sur la fortune; ISF). She defended the tax shield put in place by the government of Nicolas Sarkozy in 2010 and denounced François Hollande's tax program during the 2012 French presidential election, telling Paris Match: "I believe that most people do not realize the tragedy that the ISF causes to people in my category. I am forced, almost 70 years old and ill, to sell my apartment and move out." This prompted her son Thomas Dutronc to write on Twitter: "But no mom, don't worry I'll invite you over to my place just in case..." Hardy later denied claims that she would be homeless and clarified that "the tragedy is the people who are losing their jobs because of offshoring and the [European debt] crisis".

Hardy expressed her support for legalising abortion, while distancing herself from feminism. In 2015, the singer criticised feminist activists in her essay "Avis non autorisés ...", in which she wrote: "I find them surly, ugly, that is to say not feminine for two cents. I have never been able to identify in anything with feminists. There are, however, some that I could have idealized..."

During the 2017–2018 protests in France, Hardy expressed her support for President Emmanuel Macron. She said, "We must let him reform France. Part of the French people don't want to see the reality and are stuck in the Marxist ideology. What I like about President Macron is that he is an idealist but not an ideologue and is firmly grounded in reality." During the 2023 French pension reform strikes, she told Le Journal du Dimanche that she was "ashamed of what was happening" in France, fearing that "repeated strikes" would deter tourists, and defended the pension reform bill.

== Legacy and influence ==
Few splendors remain so long in the memory. If the music of the yé-yé girls was always a jovial gleam that dazzled, that of Françoise Hardy survives as perhaps the most intense due to her sentimental complexity, a whole swirl of past and future nostalgia sung with overwhelming intimacy. Today it seems like one more trifle, but then, back in the sixties of the last century, hearing a song of heartbreak in the mouth of this woman with a sweet and penetrating voice marked a milestone.

— Fernando Navarro, El País, 2020.

Hardy was celebrated as a "French national treasure" and one of the greatest figures in French music. She was one of the best-selling music artists in French history, with over 7.6 million records sold by November 2017. American critic Richie Unterberger described her as "indisputably the finest pop-rock artist to emerge from that country in the 1960s" and said he would like to see Hardy inducted into the Rock and Roll Hall of Fame. In 2011, Hardy was included in Le Petit Larousse Illustré.

Long after her heyday in the 1960s, Hardy remained an important and influential figure in fashion history. During his time at Balenciaga, designer Nicolas Ghesquière described her in Vogue as "the very essence of French style". The photographs of the singer wearing a Paco Rabanne metal-plated dress inspired Lizzy Gardiner's design of the costumes of Priscilla, Queen of the Desert and her own Oscars dress. Hardy was a muse to Japanese designer Rei Kawakubo, who named her label Comme des Garçons after a lyric in the song "Tous les garçons et les filles".

Over her career, Hardy amassed a large fanbase among gay men and was regarded as a gay icon by the community. She said on several occasions that her most devoted friends and fans were gay.

Hardy's musical influence is found in the work of Francophone acts such as Coralie Clément, La Femme, Juliette Armanet, Melody's Echo Chamber, Keren Ann and Carla Bruni, who imitated Hardy's style for her musical debut. Writers have pointed to her influence on the music of English avant-pop group Stereolab, including similarities in Hardy's vocals and those of lead singer Lætitia Sadier. Outside the French-speaking world, she has been mentioned as an inspiration to female singer-songwriters like Caroline Polachek, Charli XCX, Angel Olsen, Candie Payne, Erin Rae, Heather Trost, Violetta Zironi, Zooey Deschanel and Cat Power. Hardy has also influenced alternative music acts such as Broadcast, Goldfrapp, Jeremy Jay, The Chap and Xeno & Oaklander. In an article for Into Creative, Filmmaker Grant McPhee described her as 'A poster-girl for shy people and a fantasy figure for believing they too can be cool' In 2021, Rivers Cuomo of American rock band Weezer cited Hardy as one of his "sonic ideals", and side he was particularly influenced by her album Message personnel. Greg Gonzalez of American dream pop band Cigarettes After Sex called Hardy one of his biggest musical influences, stating in 2016: "La question is just so perfect, I wanted that kind of beauty."

The 1971 cult album La question appeared in The Guardian's "1000 albums to hear before you die". The album would gain a cult following after its release and it became regarded as Hardy's artistic peak.

In 2017, Pitchfork ranked Tous les garçons et les filles 90th on its list of "The 200 Best Albums of the 1960s", with Marc Hogan describing it as "an enduring middle ground between rockabilly shimmy and Gallic introspection, delivered by the most glamorous wallflower in France." In 2023, Rolling Stone ranked Hardy at number 162 on its list of the 200 Greatest Singers of All Time.

=== Personal assessment on career ===
Hardy was critical of her first albums, Tous les garçons et les filles and Le premier bonheur du jour, despite their popularity. She said in interviews in 2018 that she "felt very frustrated because I wanted to have beautiful electric guitars... Instead, I had very bad French musicians and a terribly bad musical production." After she went to London in 1963 to record new albums, she felt able "to make another kind of music, not this mechanical music I had been trapped in."

Despite the poor commercial performances of her early 1970s releases, La question, Et si je m'en vais avant toi, and If You Listen, Hardy felt artistically vindicated. She felt especially proud of La question, stating in 2008: "while it did not enjoy great success with the public at large, at least I can claim that it did touch another audience... Often an ambitious record can be more or less ignored when it is released but ends up having a long life." In a 1996 interview with The Independent, Hardy said she believed that most people did not know her artistry, and that she always had to talk about the 1960s and the Beatles.

== Personal life ==
=== Family ===
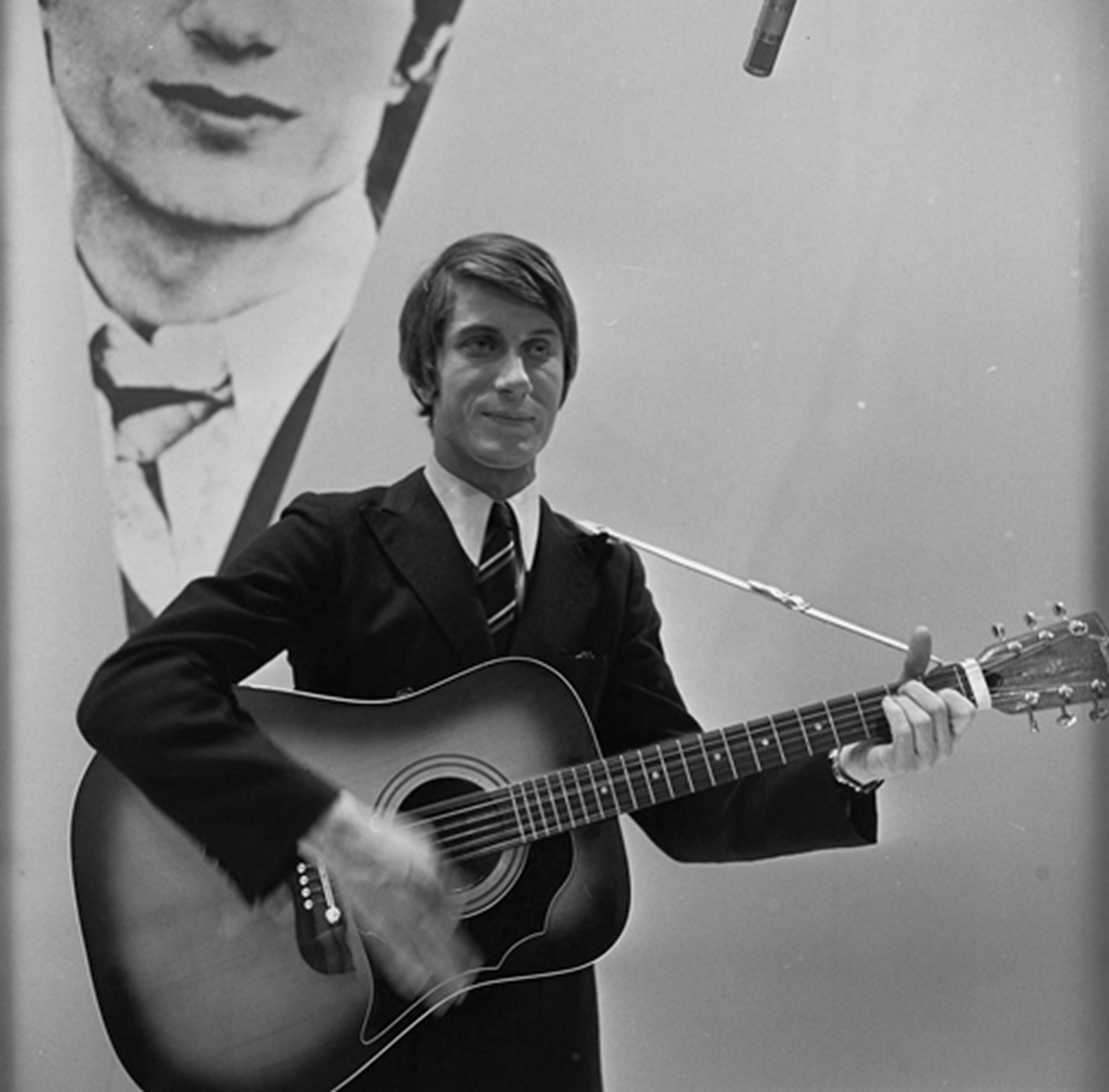
Hardy and fellow musician Jacques Dutronc began their relationship in 1967 and married in 1981.

In 1962 Hardy formed a romantic and professional relationship with Salut Les Copains photographer Jean-Marie Périer. They did not live together and were constantly apart because of their work obligations, which took a toll on the relationship. They broke up in 1966 but remained close friends and collaborators. Hardy began a highly publicized relationship with singer Jacques Dutronc in 1967. After the birth of their only child, a son Thomas, on 16 June 1973, Hardy and Dutronc moved into in a three-story house near Parc Montsouris in the autumn of 1974. The family moved every summer to a house owned by Dutronc in Lumio on the island of Corsica. As an adult, Hardy's son Thomas Dutronc also developed a career as a musician.

Hardy and Dutronc were married on 30 March 1981 in a private ceremony. According to Hardy, they formalized their relationship for "fiscal reasons", and on the advice of Hardy's lawyer for health and safety reasons. The couple separated in 1988 due to infidelities on both parts and Dutronc's alcoholism. They never divorced and their relationship became a "special friendship". In 2016, she told Le Parisien that although Dutronc had a new partner, he did not want a divorce from Hardy.

In the early 1980s, she learned that her distant father had led a double life as a closeted gay man when one of his young lovers bragged about his financial support to one of Dutronc's friends. He died in a hospital on 6 February 1981 after being assaulted, probably by a young male prostitute, which was not reported in the press at the time. Hardy's sister Michèle was raised without the affection of their parents, and developed suicidal and paranoid schizophrenic tendencies. In May 2004, she was found dead at her home in L'Île-Rousse from a probable suicide.

=== Health and death ===
Between late 2004 and early 2005, Hardy was diagnosed with MALT lymphoma, which inaugurated a "hellish period" that disrupted her life. She underwent chemotherapy treatment that was initially successful. In March 2015, her condition worsened, and she had to be admitted to hospital, where she was put into an artificial coma and nearly died. While in hospital, she broke her hip and elbow. She told Le Figaro in 2015: "I also have a lot of difficulty walking... There are times when I absolutely cannot see anyone and I cannot go out. But I remain positive... I avoid thinking about it, it does not obsess me." Hardy underwent further chemotherapy and immunotherapy sessions. Her health worsened, and in 2021 she made news as an advocate for the legalization of physician-assisted suicide in France. She said in interviews that if her condition became unbearable to the point where she could no longer "do the things that [her] life requires", she would resort to euthanasia, but would not have the consultation to do so. In the same year, she disclosed that she could no longer sing as a result of the effects of the treatments. Hardy died of laryngeal cancer in Paris, on 11 June 2024, at the age of 80. Before her death she had also experienced several falls and bone fractures. Her son announced her death on Instagram, writing "Mom is gone..." On 20 June 2024 a farewell ceremony took place at Père Lachaise Cemetery at the crematorium and columbarium building.

== Selected discography ==
- Untitled album (Tous les garçons et les filles (All The Boys And Girls)) (1962)
- Untitled album (Le premier bonheur du jour (The First Good Time Of The Day)) (1963)
- Untitled album (Françoise Hardy canta per voi in italiano (English: Françoise Hardy Sings For You In Italian) (1963)
- Untitled album (Mon amie la rose (My Friend The Rose) (1964)
- Untitled album (L'amitié (Friendship) (1965)
- In English (1966)
- Untitled album (La maison où j'ai grandi (The House Where I Grew Up)) (1966)
- Ma jeunesse fout le camp... (My Youth Is Leaving...) (1967)
- Untitled album (Comment te dire adieu (How To Say Goodbye To You)) (1968)
- Untitled album (La Question (The Question) (1971)
- Personne d'autre (Nobody Else) (2018)

== Filmography ==
| Year | Title | Role | Director | Notes | Ref. |
|---|---|---|---|---|---|
| 1963 | Nutty, Naughty Chateau (Château en Suède) | Ophélie | Roger Vadim | — | |
| 1964 | The Hully Gully Boys (I Ragazzi Dell'Hully Gully) | Herself | Marcello Giannini and Carlo Infascelli | musical performer | |
| 1965 | This Crazy, Crazy World of Song (Questo Pazzo, Pazzo Mondo Della Canzone) | Herself | Bruno Corbucci and Giovanni Grimaldi | musical performer | |
| 1965 | What's New Pussycat? | Mayor's secretary | Clive Donner | cameo appearance | |
| 1965 | Highest Pressure (Altissima Pressione) | Herself | Enzo Trapani | musical performer | |
| 1966 | Devil at My Heels (Une balle au cœur) | Anna | Jean-Daniel Pollet | — | |
| 1966 | Masculine Feminine | American officer's companion | Jean-Luc Godard | cameo appearance | |
| 1966 | Europe Sing (Europa Canta) | Herself | José Luis Merino | musical performer | |
| 1966 | Grand Prix | Lisa | John Frankenheimer | — | |
| 1968 | Monte Carlo: It's The Rose (Monte Carlo: C'est La Rose) | Herself | Michael Pfleghar | television special | |
| 1969 | The Man Who Came From Cher (L'Homme Qui Venait du Cher) | Suzanne | Pierre Desfons | television film | |
| 1972 | The Doves (Les Colombes) | Young hippie | Jean-Claude Lord | cameo appearance | |
| 1976 | If I Had to Do It All Over Again (Si C'Était à Refaire) | Herself | Claude Lelouch | musical performer | |

== Published works ==
Astrological

- Le grand livre de la Vierge (The Great Book Of The Virgin) (with Béatrice Guénin) (1979)
- Entre les lignes, entre les signes (Between The Lines, Between The Signs) (with Anne-Marie Simond) (1986)
- L'astrologie universelle (Universal Astrology) (1987)
- Les rythmes du zodiaque (The Rhythms Of The Zodiac) (2003)

Non-fiction

- Notes secrètes: entretiens avec Eric Dumont (Secret Notes: Interviews With Eric Dumont) (1991) (interview)
- Le désespoir des singes... et autres bagatelles (The Despair Of The Monkeys... And Other Trifles) (2008) (autobiography)
- Avis non autorisés... (Unauthorized Reviews...) (2015) (essay)
- Un cadeau du ciel... (A Gift From Heaven...) (2016) (essay)
- Chansons sur toi et nous (Songs About You And Us) (2021) (songbook)

Novels

- L'amour fou (Crazy Love) (2014)

== See also ==
- French fashion
- French rock music
- List of astrologers
- List of baroque pop artists
- List of folk rock artists
- List of French singers
- List of yé-yé singers

== Bibliography ==
- Briggs, Jonathyne (2015). Sounds French: Globalization, Cultural Communities, and Pop Music in France, 1958–1980. Oxford University Press. ISBN 978-0199377060.
- Deluxe, Jean-Emmanuel (2013). Yé-Yé Girls of '60s French Pop. Feral House. ISBN 978-1936239719.
- Hardy, Françoise (2018) [2008]. The Despair of Monkeys and Other Trifles: A Memoir by Françoise Hardy [Le désespoir des singes... et autres bagatelles] (eBook). Translated by Graham, Jon E. Feral House. ISBN 978-1-62731-0734.
- Lesueur, Daniel (2015). Françoise Hardy: Catch a Rising Star (in French). Camion Blanc. ISBN 978-2357797666.
- Quinonero, Frédéric (2017). Françoise Hardy, un long chant d'amour (eBook) (in French). Éditions l'Archipel. ISBN 978-2809822267.

| Preceded by François Deguelt with Dis rien | Monaco in the Eurovision Song Contest; 1963 | Succeeded by Romuald Figuier with Où sont-elles passées |
