= Clair-obscur (album) =

Studio album by Françoise Hardy
- Released: 11 July 2000
- Genre: French pop
- Length: 51:56
- Label: Virgin

Françoise Hardy chronology
Le Danger (1996)	Clair-obscur (2000)	Tant de belles choses (2004)

Professional ratings
Review scores
Source	Rating
Allmusic	link

Clair-obscur (English: twilight) is a 2000 album by Françoise Hardy, released in France in May 2000 on LP and CD, Virgin France S.A. (7243 8 492031 9) and (7243 8 492032 6).

== Track listing ==
1. "Puisque vous partez en voyage" (Mireille, Jean Nohain) duet with Jacques Dutronc
2. "Tous mes souvenirs me tuent (Tears)" (Stéphane Grappelli, Django Reinhardt, F. Hardy)
3. "Celui que tu veux" (Yonis Balmayer, Olivier Ngog) duet with Ol
4. "Clair-obscur" (Khalil Chahine, F. Hardy)
5. "Un Homme est mort" (José María Cano, F. Hardy)
6. "Duck's Blues" (Alain Lubrano, F. Hardy)
7. "I'll Be Seeing You" (Sammy Fain, Irving Kahal) duet with Iggy Pop
8. "Tu ressembles à tous ceux qui ont eu du chagrin" (F. Hardy)
9. "La Pleine lune" (Alain Lubrano, F. Hardy)
10. "So Sad (To Watch Good Love Go Bad)" (Don Everly) duet with Étienne Daho
11. "La Saison des pluies" (Christophe Rose, F. Hardy)
12. "Contre vents et marées" (Eric Clapton, F. Hardy)
13. "La Vérité des choses" (Alain Lubrano, F. Hardy)

== Personnel ==
- Françoise Hardy – vocals
- Jean-Pierre Sabar – piano
- Jean-Claude Dubois – orchestra director
- Pierre-Alain Dahan – drums
- Marc Perier – bass

== Certifications and sales ==
Region	Certification	Certified units/sales
France (SNEP)	Gold	100,000^{*}
^{*} Sales figures based on certification alone.
