= Grande médaille de la chanson française =

The Grande médaille de la chanson française is an award given by the Académie française to prominent singers in French. It was created in 1938. The award takes the form of a silver-gilt medal, hence its other name, "médaille de vermeil".

== Winners ==
- 1988 : Gilles Vigneault
- 1989 : Claude Nougaro
- 1990 : Louis Amade
- 1991 : no award
- 1992 : Mireille
- 1993 : Barbara
- 1994 : Guy Béart
- 1995 : Charles Aznavour
- 1996 : Robert Charlebois
- 1997: Yves Simon
- 1998: MC Solaar
- 1999: no award
- 2000: Henri Salvador
- 2001: Michel Sardou
- 2002: Alain Souchon
- 2003: Pierre Perret
- 2004: Renaud
- 2005: Catherine Lara
- 2006: Françoise Hardy
- 2007: Serge Rezvani
- 2008: Georges Moustaki
- 2009: Anne Sylvestre
- 2010: Francis Cabrel
- 2011: David McNeil
- 2012: Maxime Le Forestier
- 2013: Serge Lama
- 2014: William Sheller
- 2015: Véronique Sanson
- 2016: Jean-Jacques Goldman
- 2017: Gérard Manset
- 2018: Thomas Fersen
- 2019: Vincent Delerm
- 2020: Étienne Daho
- 2021: Abdourahman Waberi
- 2022: Jacques Dutronc
- 2023: La Grande Sophie
- 2024: Salvatore Adamo
- 2025: Brigitte Fontaine

== See also ==
- Grand Prix du roman de l'Académie française
