= Message personnel =

- Original French cover

Single by Françoise Hardy

from the album Message personnel
- Released: November 1973
- Studio: Studio du Poste parisien, Paris, France
- Genre: chanson, pop
- Length: 4:15
- Label: WEA - Filipacchi Music/Warner Bros. Records
- Composer: Michel Berger
- Lyricists: Michel Berger, Françoise Hardy
- Producer: Michel Berger

Music video
- "Message personnel" (French TV, 1973) on YouTube

"Message personnel" is a song by French singer-songwriter Françoise Hardy from her 1973 album Message personnel. It was also released as a single.

The song was a commercial and critical success. Its title track reignited the singer's career in France. She promoted the album with appearances on French TV shows, including Dimanche Salvador, Sports en fête, Top à, La Une est à vous, Midi trente, Minuit chez vous, Tempo, Averty's Follies, and Domino.

== Writing and composition ==
- Françoise Hardy: Title of the song and words of the spoken part.
- Michel Berger: Lyrics and music of the sung part.
- The recording was produced by Michel Berger.

== Track listing ==
7" single Warner Bros. 16 331 (1973)

1. "Message personnel" (4:15)
2. "Première rencontre" (2:50)

== Charts ==
Chart (2010)	Peak position
Belgium (Ultratop Back Catalogue Singles Wallonia)	1
Chart (2013)	Peak position
France (SNEP)	183

== Cover versions ==
The song has been covered by Michel Berger himself, France Gall, Isabelle Huppert (in the 2002 film 8 Women), Jenifer, Willeke Alberti (in Dutch under the title "Als je komt dan zal ik thuis zijn"), Heather Nova, Lara Fabian, Julie Pietri, Véronique Sanson, Barbara Carlotti & Dominique A.

Françoise Hardy also recorded an English version, titled also "Message personnel".
