= Message personnel (album) =

- Original French cover

Studio album by Françoise Hardy
- Released: November 1973
- Studio: Studio du Poste parisien, Paris France
- Genre: French pop
- Length: 27:20
- Label: Filipacchi Music/Warner Bros. Records (WEA)
- Producer: Michel Berger; Serge Gainsbourg & Jean-Claude Vannier (A3)

Françoise Hardy chronology
If You Listen (1972)	Message personnel (1973)	Entr'acte (1974)

Message personnel is the 14th studio album by Françoise Hardy. It was released in November 1973.

== Track listing ==
Side A
No.	Title	Lyrics	Music	Length
1.	"Première Rencontre"	Michel Berger	Michel Berger	2:50
2.	"Rêver le nez en l'air"	Françoise Hardy – Jean-Noël Dupré	Jean-Pierre Pouret	2:45
3.	"L'Amour en privé"	Serge Gainsbourg	Jean-Claude Vannier	2:28
4.	"Berceuse" (Valsa Para Uma Menininha)	Georges Moustaki	Toquinho	2:41
5.	"Pouce, au revoir"	Françoise Hardy	Jean-Pierre Castelain	3:22
6.	"L'Attente"	Françoise Hardy	Gérard Kawczynski	2:15
7.	"...La Bataille"	Françoise Hardy		0:06

Side B
No.	Title	Lyrics	Music	Length
1.	"On dirait"	Françoise Hardy	Jean-Pierre Pouret	2:50
2.	"L'Habitude" (duet with Georges Moustaki)	Georges Moustaki	Georges Moustaki	2:07
3.	"Chanson floue"	Christian Ravasco	Thierry Matioszek	2:35
4.	"Message personnel"	Spoken part: Françoise Hardy; Singing part: Michel Berger	Michel Berger	4:15

== Charts ==
In November 2013 the album was released in a new 40th-anniversary edition and re-entered the French and Belgian charts.

Chart (2013)	Peak position
Belgian Albums (Ultratop Wallonia)	129
French Albums (SNEP)	105
