= Personne d'autre =

Studio album by Françoise Hardy
- Released: April 20, 2018
- Genre: French pop
- Length: 40:00
- Label: Parlophone/Warner Music

Françoise Hardy chronology
| L'Amour fou (2012) | Personne d'autre (2018) |

Professional ratings
Aggregate scores
| Source | Rating |
|---|---|
| Metacritic | 68/100 |
Review scores
| Source | Rating |
| AllMusic | 3.5/5 stars |

Personne d'autre is the 28th and final studio album by French singer Françoise Hardy. It was released in April 2018 under Parlophone/Warner Music.

Personne d’autre features 10 original songs, including one sung in English, "You’re My Home" penned by Yael Naim, a cover of Michel Berger’s "Seras-tu là", and an adaption of Finnish band Poets Of The Fall’s ‘Sleep’, titled "Dors mon ange".

== Track listing ==
| No. | Title | Lyrics | Music | Length |
|---|---|---|---|---|
| 1. | "A cache-cache" | Françoise Hardy | Erick Benzi | 3:31 |
| 2. | "Dors mon ange" | Françoise Hardy (French adaptation) | Marko Saaresto, Markus Kaarlonen, Olli Tukiainen | 4:06 |
| 3. | "Personne d'autre" | Françoise Hardy | Pascale Daniel | 3:01 |
| 4. | "Un seul geste" | Françoise Hardy | Erick Benzi | 3:24 |
| 5. | "You're My Home" | Yael Naim - David Donatien | Yael Naim | 3:24 |
| 6. | "Seras-tu là ?" | Michel Berger | Michel Berger | 3:09 |
| 7. | "Quel dommage" | Françoise Hardy | Maissat | 3:19 |
| 8. | "Train spécial" | Françoise Hardy | Erick Benzi | 4:08 |
| 9. | "Brumes" | Françoise Hardy | Erick Benzi | 3:03 |
| 10. | "Trois petits tours" | Françoise Hardy | Thierry Stremler | 3:11 |
| 11. | "Le Large" | La Grande Sophie | La Grande Sophie | 3:46 |
| 12. | "Un mal qui fait du bien" | Françoise Hardy | Thierry Stremler | 1:34 |
| Total length: | | | | 40:00 |

== Certifications ==
| Region | Certification | Certified units/sales |
|---|---|---|
| France (SNEP) | Gold | 50,000^{‡} |
^{‡} Sales+streaming figures based on certification alone.
