= En anglais =

Studio album by Françoise Hardy
- Released: October 1968 (United Kingdom)
- Studio: Olympic Studios, London
- Genre: Pop
- Length: 31:15
- Language: English
- Label: United Artists
- Producer: Asparagus Productionx: Françoise Hardy; Jacques Wolfsohn; Léon Cabat

Françoise Hardy chronology
Ma jeunesse fout le camp… (1967)	En anglais (1968)	Françoise Hardy (1968)

Reissue in compact disc
- Japanese cover (1990)

En anglais is a studio album by popular French singer Françoise Hardy. It was originally released in United Kingdom in October 1968, on LP by Asparagus Productions/United Artists Records (ULP 1207) in mono and stereo (SULP 1207) formats. The LP saw a French release in December 1968 by Asparagus Productions/Disques Vogue/Vogue international industries (CLD 729) in a stéréo universelle format. Jean-Marie Périer was credited for the cover photography.

== Track listing ==
Françoise Hardy is accompanied by orchestras directed by Charles Blackwell (1-2-3-11), Arthur Greenslade (4-5-7-8-9), Simon Napier-Bell (6-12) and Jean-Pierre Sabar (10).

Side one
No.	Title	Lyrics	Music	Length
1.	"Loving You"	Jerry Leiber	Mike Stoller	3:05
2.	"Hang On to a Dream"	Tim Hardin	Tim Hardin	2:10
3.	"Will You Love Me Tomorrow"	Gerry Goffin	Carole King	2:35
4.	"Lonesome Town"	Thomas Baker Knight	Thomas Baker Knight	2:05
5.	"Who'll Be the Next in Line"	Ray Davies	Dave Davies	2:10
6.	"Never Learn to Cry"	Vicki Wickham – Simon Napier-Bell	Simon Napier-Bell	2:40
Total length:				15:15

Side two
No.	Title	Lyrics	Music	Length
7.	"There But for Fortune"	Phil Ochs	Phil Ochs	3:10
8.	"That'll Be The Day"	Buddy Holly – Jerry Allison – Norman Petty	Buddy Holly – Jerry Allison – Norman Petty	2:15
9.	"The Way of Love"	Al Stillman	Jack Diéval	2:30
10.	"Tiny Goddess"	Patrick Campbell-Lyons – Alex Spyropoulos	Patrick Campbell-Lyons – Alex Spyropoulos – Ray Singer	3:00
11.	"Let It Be Me"	Manny Curtis	Gilbert Bécaud	2:40
12.	"Empty Sunday"	Vicki Wickham – Simon Napier-Bell	Simon Napier-Bell	2:25
Total length:				16:00

== Editions ==
=== LP records: first editions in the English-speaking world ===
- South Africa, 1968: Françoise - The Second English Album, World Records Co (ORC 6024).
- United States, 1968: Loving, Reprise Records (RS 6318).
- Australia, 1969: Françoise Hardy in Anglais [sic], Production Asparagus/Phono Vox Records, coll. “Celebrity Series”, Vol. 2 (LPV 001).
- Canada, 1969: Loving, Reprise Records (RS 6318).
- New Zealand, 1969: Will You Love Me Tomorrow, Interfusion (SITFL 934.135).

=== Reissues ===
- Japan, 1990: CD (Jewel case), En anglais, Epic Records/Sony Records (ESCA 5191).
- United Kingdom, 2016: LP, En anglais, Parlophone/Warner Music (190295 989590).
- United Kingdom, 2016: CD (digipack), En anglais, Parlophone/Warner Music (190296 997488).
