= La Pluie sans parapluie =

La Pluie sans parapluie (Rain Without an Umbrella) is the twenty-sixth album by French singer Françoise Hardy. The original edition was published in France on 24 March 2010. It has been published in France and abroad.
