= French popular music =

Music scene

French popular music is a music of France belonging to any of a number of musical styles that are accessible to the general public and mostly distributed commercially. It stands in contrast to French classical music, which historically was the music of elites or the upper strata of society. It also differs from traditional French folk music which was shared non-commercially. It is sometimes abbreviated to French pop music; however, French pop music is more often used for a narrower branch of popular music.

The late 19th century saw the dawn of the music hall when Yvette Guilbert was a major star. The era lasted through to the 1930s and saw the likes of Félix Mayol, Lucienne Boyer, Marie-Louise Damien, Marie Dubas, Fréhel, Georges Guibourg, Tino Rossi, Jean Sablon, Charles Trenet and Maurice Chevalier.

French popular music in the 20th century included chanson music by the likes of Édith Piaf as well as Yves Montand, Georges Brassens, Léo Ferré, Jean Ferrat, Barbara or Serge Reggiani, and the more art-house musicians like Brigitte Fontaine. The 1960s brought the wave of Ye-Ye with such legends as Johnny Hallyday, Eddy Mitchell, Sylvie Vartan, Dick Rivers, Richard Anthony, Claude François, Françoise Hardy, France Gall and Jacques Dutronc — with a special mention to legend Serge Gainsbourg who started out as a realist singer in the late 50s, and became a pop icon in the 60s writing songs for Ye-Ye idols, then for himself and for stars like Brigitte Bardot, Jane Birkin, Catherine Deneuve and Isabelle Adjani.

Like Spanish Zarzuelas and Italian operettas, French songs are today still part of a dynamic French social movement which has for centuries – since the French Revolution – moved audiences with elegant and often poetic lyrics combined with realism around social and political themes. Renaud is one of the best known singers in the genre, alongside committed singers such as Maxime Le Forestier, Marc Ogeret, François Béranger and Bernard Lavilliers.

The most widely recognized songs such as "Non, je ne regrette rien", "Les feuilles mortes" or Jacques Brel's "Ne me quitte pas" have successors in diverse genres such as French electronic music, rock, pop or rap. However the chanson genre remains popular and there are even competitions such as Star Academy (France) and The Voice (France) that leave a large space for the chanson française and French pop genres. Among the modern followers of chanson, we find Michel Polnareff, Christophe, Julien Clerc, Véronique Sanson, Alain Souchon, Laurent Voulzy, Louis Chedid, Francis Cabrel, Michel Jonasz, Alain Chamfort, Alain Bashung, Pierre Bachelet...

From the 1990s and 2000s, a new generation of singers walks in the footsteps of their elders, from Bénabar to Juliette Armanet in the 2020s.
