= Viola (disambiguation) =

The viola is a stringed musical instrument related to the violin. Viola also may refer to:

== Guitars ==
Viola is a term for several Portuguese and Brazilian regional folk guitars, frequently called simply "viola" in their respective regions:

- Portugal:
  - Viola amarantina, a 5-course, 10-string guitar
  - Viola beiroa, a small harp guitar with twelve strings
  - Viola braguesa, a 5-course, 10-string guitar
  - Viola da terra, a 5-course, 12- or 15-string guitar
  - Viola de arame, a 5-course, 9-string guitar from Madeira
  - Viola da Terceira, a 6-course, 15-string guitar from the Azores
  - Viola toeira, a 5-course, 12-string guitar
- Brazil:
  - Viola caipira, a 5-course, 10-string Brazilian guitar
  - Viola de cocho a 5-course, 5-string Brazilian guitar
  - Viola sertaneja, a 5-course, 10-string Brazilian guitar

== Organisms ==
- Viola (butterfly), a genus of skipper butterflies
- Viola (plant), a genus of flowering plants, including violets and pansies

== Places ==
=== United States ===
- Viola, Arkansas, a town
- Viola, California, an unincorporated community
- Viola, Delaware, a town
- Viola, Georgia, an unincorporated community
- Viola, Idaho, an unincorporated community
- Viola, Illinois, a village
- Viola, Iowa, an unincorporated community
- Viola, Kansas, a city
- Viola, Kentucky, an unincorporated community
- Viola, Minnesota, an unincorporated community
- Viola, Missouri, an unincorporated community
- Viola, New York, a hamlet
- Viola, Tennessee, a town
- Viola, Marion County, West Virginia, an unincorporated community
- Viola, Marshall County, West Virginia, an unincorporated community
- Viola, Wisconsin, a village
- Viola Township (disambiguation), various townships
- Lake Viola (Florida), a lake in Highlands County, Florida

=== Italy ===
- Viola, Piedmont, a comune in the province of Cuneo
- Lago Viola, a small lake in Lombardy

== People ==
- Viola (given name), a female given name, including a list of people and fictional characters with the name
- Viola (surname)
- Viola, Duchess of Opole (died 1251), a duchess consort and regent of the Silesian duchy of Opole
- Viola (singer) (born 1976), stage name of Italian singer Violante Placido
- Viola (footballer) (born 1969), Brazilian footballer Paulo Sergio Rosa
- Viola, pen name of American poet Laura M. Hawley Thurston (1812-1842)
- Paulinho da Viola, Brazilian musician born Paulo César Batista de Faria in 1942

== Military ==
- Viola (trawler), an English steam trawler built in 1906
- HMS Viola, an Aubrietia-class sloop launched in 1916
- Viola, the original name of HMS Legion (1914) a Laforey-class destroyer, laid down in 1912

== Other uses ==
- Typhoon Viola, various typhoons, a tropical storm and a tropical depression
- Viola (opera), an unfinished opera by Bedřich Smetana
- 1076 Viola, an asteroid
- Viol@, a 1998 Italian erotic drama film
- Viola Reggio Calabria, an Italian basketball team
- ViolaWWW, an American web browser
- I Viola, a nickname of the Italian football club ACF Fiorentina
- Berimbau viola, the smallest berimbau in the berimbau ensembles

== See also ==
- Viol, a family of stringed musical instruments
  - Viola da Gamba, another name for the viol
- Violin (disambiguation)
- Voila (disambiguation)
- Violet (disambiguation)
- Violeta (disambiguation)
- Violetta (disambiguation)
- Violette (disambiguation)
