= Violetta =

Violetta may refer to:

- Violetta (given name), a female given name
- Violetta (instrument), 16th-century musical instrument similar to a violin, but with only three strings
- Violetta (performer) (born circa 1906/07), an American sideshow performer, born Aloisla Wagner
- Violetta (singer) (5 April 1995), full name Violetta Zironi, Italian singer-songwriter
- Violetta (TV series), a Disney Channel telenovela
  - Violetta season 1, the first season of the telenovela
  - Violetta (soundtrack), the first soundtrack album of the telenovela
- Violetta (typeface)
- 557 Violetta, a main-belt asteroid
- La traviata or Violetta, an opera by Giuseppe Verdi
- Violetta, a 1962 Indonesian film by Bachtiar Siagian

== See also ==
- Violeta (disambiguation)
- Violet (colour)
- Violette (disambiguation)
- Violet (disambiguation)
- Viola (disambiguation)
- Viorica, a female given name
