= Violeta =

Violeta is the form of the female given name Violet in use in several languages. It can mean:

== People ==
- Violeta (given name), female given name

== Movies ==
- Violeta Went to Heaven (Spanish: Violeta se fue a los cielos), a 2011 Chilean film

== Music ==
- Azul Violeta, a Mexican Latin rock band
- Ornatos Violeta, a Portuguese alternative rock group
- Violeta Violeta, a series of studio albums by Norwegian alternative rock group Kaizers Orchestra
- "Violeta", a song by Iz*One, 2019
- "Violeta", a song by Puerto Rican singer Chayanne from his 1987 album Chayanne

== Places ==
- Violeta, Cuba (officially Primero de Enero), a Cuban town of Ciego de Ávila Province

== Books ==
- Violeta (novel), a 2022 novel by Isabel Allende

== See also ==
- Violet (colour)
- Violetta (disambiguation)
- Violette (disambiguation)
- Violet (disambiguation)
- Viola (disambiguation)
- Viorica, female given name
