= Shantz =

Shantz is a surname. Notable people named Shantz include:

- Billy Shantz (1927–1993), American baseball player
- Bobby Shantz (born 1925), American baseball pitcher
- Homer L. Shantz (1876–1958), American botanist
- Jacob Yost Shantz (1822–1909), Canadian businessman
- Jeff Shantz (born 1973), Canadian hockey player
- Lorne Shantz (1920–1999), Canadian politician
- Penny Shantz (Ryan) (born 1953), Canadian curler
- Sarah Shantz-Smiley (born 1982), women's ice hockey coach
- Susan Shantz (born 1957) Canadian sculptor
- Viola Shelly Shantz (1895–1977), American zoologist

== See also ==
- Schantz (surname)
- Schanz (surname)
