= Walter Burdick =

American politician (1893–1982)

Member of the Minnesota Senate from the 4th district
- In office January 7, 1947 – January 5, 1959
- Preceded by: William B. Richardson
- Succeeded by: Sandy Keith

Member of the Minnesota House of Representatives from the 4th district
- In office January 3, 1939 – January 6, 1947

Personal details
- Born: April 23, 1893 Viola Township, Olmsted County, Minnesota, U.S.
- Died: March 7, 1982 (aged 88) Rochester, Minnesota, U.S.
- Cause of death: Heart failure
- Children: 1
- Profession: Politician, farmer

Walter Burdick (April 23, 1893 – March 7, 1982) was an American farmer and politician.

Burdick was born in Viola Township, Olmsted County, Minnesota. He went to the Minneapolis public schools. Burdick lived in Rochester, Minnesota, with his wife and family and was a farmer. He was a member of the Minnesota House of Representatives from 1939 to 1946 and in the Minnesota Senate from 1947 to 1958. He died at a nursing home in Rochester, Minnesota.
