= Viorel =

- Pronunciation: Romanian: [vi.oˈrel]
- Gender: Male
- Language: Romanian

Origin
- Meaning: "violet"

Viorel is a Romanian male given name, derived from viorea (meaning the sweet violet flower).

Its female forms are Violeta and Viorica.

== Notable people with the name ==
- Viorel P. Barbu (born 1941), Romanian mathematician
- Viorel Cataramă (born 1955), Romanian businessman and politician
- Viorel Cosma (1923 – 2017), Romanian musician and musicologist
- Viorel Gherciu (born 1969), Moldovan politician
- Viorel Hrebenciuc (born 1953), Romanian politician and statistician
- Viorel Ion (born 1967), Romanian footballer
- Viorel Melnic (born 1975), Moldovan politician and economist
- Viorel Tilea (1896 – 1972), Romanian diplomat
