= Violet =

Violet usually refers to:

- Violet (color), a spectral color with wavelengths shorter than blue
- One of several plants named violet, particularly:
  - Viola (plant), a genus of flowering plants

Violet may also refer to:

== Places ==
=== United States ===
- Violet, Louisiana
- Violet, Missouri
- Violet, Texas
- Violet, West Virginia

=== Elsewhere ===
- Violet, Ontario, Canada
- Violet Town, Victoria, Australia

== Media and entertainment ==
=== Film ===
- Violet (1921 film), a German silent film
- Violet (1978 film), a Croatian feature film
- Violet (1981 film), a short film
- Violet (2000 film), a Canadian comedy film directed by Rosemary House
- Violet (2014 film), a Dutch film
- Violet (2021 film), an American drama film

=== Music ===
==== Albums ====
- Violet (The Birthday Massacre album), 2004
- Violet (Closterkeller album), 1993
- Violet, a 2018 EP by Pentagon
- Violet (L.S. Dunes album), 2025

==== Songs ====
- "Violet" (Hole song), 1995
- "Violet" (Seal song), 1992
- "Violet", a 2017 song by Pentagon from Demo_02
- "Violet", a 1996 song by Joe Morris from Elsewhere
- "Violet", a 2015 song by Daniel Caesar
- "Violet", a 2021 song by Ninomae Ina'nis from re:VISION

=== Other uses ===
- Violet (opera), a 2005 opera by Roger Scruton
- Violet (musical), by Jeanine Tesori
- Violet (computer game), a 2008 interactive fiction game
- Violet (fairy tale), an Italian fairy tale by Giambattista Basile
- Pokémon Violet, one of the two paired Pokémon Scarlet and Violet games for the Nintendo Switch
- Violet, the codename for Kasumi Yoshizawa, a character from Persona 5
- Violet, one of the many codenames for Salu Digby, a character from DC Comics
- "Violet" (The Bear), a 2024 episode of The Bear TV series

== People ==
- Violet (given name), a female given name with a list of persons and fictional characters
- Arlene Violet, American nun and attorney general
- Pierre-Noël Violet, Flemish-French miniature-painter
- Pierre Violet-Marty, French World War I flying ace
- Terri Violet, American politician
- Tessa Violet, American singer-songwriter

== Ships ==
- HMS Violet, eight ships of the Royal Navy
- USS Violet, a civil war gunboat launched in 1862
- USLHT Violet, a lighthouse tender launched in 1864
- USCGC Violet (WAGL-250), a buoy tender launched in 1930
- Violet (ship), a sailing ship lost in 1758
- PS Violet, an Irish Sea ferry built in 1880

== Other uses ==
- NYU Violets, the teams of New York University
- Sea violet, Microcosmus sabatieri, a species of edible Mediterranean tunicate

== See also ==
- Violeta (disambiguation)
- Violetta (disambiguation)
- Violette (disambiguation)
- Viola (disambiguation)
