= Viola Township =

Viola Township may refer to:

== Illinois ==
- Viola Township, Lee County, Illinois

== Iowa ==
- Viola Township, Audubon County, Iowa
- Viola Township, Osceola County, Iowa
- Viola Township, Sac County, Iowa

== Kansas ==
- Viola Township, Sedgwick County, Kansas

== Minnesota ==
- Viola Township, Olmsted County, Minnesota

== South Dakota ==
- Viola Township, Jerauld County, South Dakota, in Jerauld County, South Dakota

== See also ==
- Viola (disambiguation)
