= Viola (given name) =

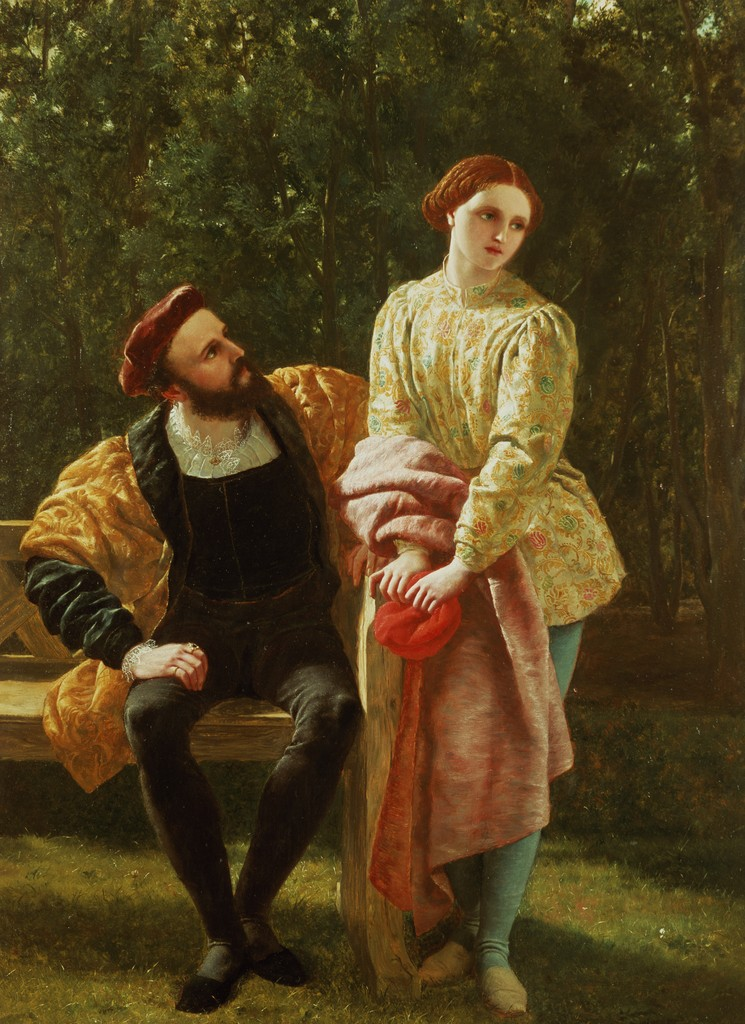
- Orsino and Viola in a scene from William Shakespeare’s Twelfth Night by Frederick Richard Pickersgill.
- Pronunciation: /ˈvaɪələ/ VY-ə-lə, /ˈvaɪoʊlə/ VY-oh-lə
- Gender: Female

Origin
- Origin: Latin
- Meaning: "violet"

Other names
- Related names: Violet Violetta Violeta

Viola is a feminine given name derived from the Latin viola, given in reference to the flowering plant species. The name is in common use in Italy. In Greece as Violeta. It is best known in the Anglosphere as a character in William Shakespeare's Twelfth Night.

== Academics ==
- Viola Birss, Canadian professor of chemistry
- Viola Garfield (1899–1983), American anthropologist
- Viola Shelly Shantz (1895–1977), American biologist and zoologist

== Activists ==
- Viola Desmond (1914–1965), African-Nova Scotian civil rights figure
- Viola Fletcher (1914–2025), American civil rights activist
- Viola Hashe (1926–1977), South African anti-apartheid activist
- Viola Hill (1892–1954), American suffragist and music director
- Viola Liuzzo (1925–1965), Unitarian Universalist civil rights activist
- Viola Pitts (1914–2004), Fort Worth community activist

== Aristocrats ==
- Viola, Duchess of Opole, 13th-century Bulgarian-Polish noble
- Viola of Teschen, Queen of Bohemia and Poland
- Viola Grosvenor, Duchess of Westminster, widow of Robert Grosvenor, 5th Duke of Westminster

== Athletes ==
- Viola Bauer (born 1976), German cross-country skier
- Viola Cheptoo Lagat (born 1989), Kenyan middle-distance runner
- Viola Goretzki (born 1956), German rower
- Viola Grahl (born 1966), German former field hockey player
- Violah Jepchumba (born 1990), Kenyan long-distance runner
- Viola Kibiwot (born 1983), Kenyan distance runner
- Viola Myers (1927–1993), Canadian athlete
- Viola Odebrecht (born 1983), German footballer
- Viola Poley (born 1955), German rower
- Viola Thomas (born 1939), Canadian barrel rolling champion
- Viola Thompson (1922–2017), American professional baseball player
- Viola Valli (born 1972), Italian long distance swimmer
- Viola Yanik (born 1982), Canadian wrestler

== Performers ==
- Viola Allen (1867–1948), American stage actress
- Viola Barry (1894–1964), American silent film actress
- Viola Compton (1886–1971), British film actress
- Viola Dana (1897–1987), American silent film actress
- Viola Davis (born 1965), American actress
- Viola Farber (1931–1998), American choreographer and dancer
- Viola Gillette (1871–1956), American contralto
- Viola Harris (1920–2017), American actress
- Viola Keats (1911–1998), British film and television actress
- Viola Lyel (1896–1972), British film and television actress
- Viola Léger, (1930–2023), Acadian-Canadian actress and former Canadian Senator
- Viola McCoy (c. 1900–c. 1956), African-American blues singer
- Viola Richard (1904–1973), American silent film actress
- Viola Roache (1885–1961), American actress
- Viola Smith (1912–2020), American drummer
- Viola Tunnard (1916–1974), English pianist
- Viola Valentino (born 1949), Italian singer
- Viola Wills (1939–2009), American pop singer

== Politicians and administrators ==
- Viola Baskerville (born 1951), Secretary of Administration in the Cabinet of Virginia Governor Tim Kaine
- Viola Jimulla (1878–1966), Chief of the Prescott Yavapai tribe
- Viola B. Sanders (1921–2013), director of Women in the Navy

== Writers ==
- Viola Bayley (1911–1997), British children's writer
- Viola Canales (born 1957), American writer
- Viola Fischerová (1935–2010), Czech poet and translator
- Viola Florence Barnes (1885–1979), American historian and author
- Viola Garvin (1898–1969), English poet and editor
- Viola Meynell (1885–1956), English writer, novelist and poet
- Viola Roseboro' (1857–1945), American editor and novelist
- Viola S. Wendt (1907–1986), American poet and educator

== Others ==
- Viola June Cobb (1927–2015), American informant for the CIA
- Viola Frey (1933–2004), American ceramics artist
- Viola Gentry (1894–1988), American aviator
- Viola Haqi (born 1975), Dutch fashion model
- Viola Klaiss (1891–1978), American organist
- Viola R. MacMillan (1903–1993), Canadian authority on mining
- Viola Slaughter (1860–1941), Arizona rancher and the wife of sheriff John Slaughter
- Viola Spolin (1906–1994), American director and teacher

== Fictional characters ==
- Viola (Kiddy Grade), in the Japanese anime television series Kiddy Grade
- Viola (She's the Man), a character in the American film She's the Man
- Viola (TimeSplitters), a character in the English video game series TimeSplitters
- Viola (Twelfth Night), a character in William Shakespeare's play Twelfth Night
- Viola (Zone of the Enders), a character in the Japanese video game series Zone of the Enders

== See also ==
- Viola (surname)
- Violette (given name)
- Violetta (given name)
- Violeta (given name)
- Violet (given name)
- Viorica, a feminine given name
