= Gustavo Zanatta =

Mexican politician

- Born: 28 January 1951 (age 75); Oaxaca, Mexico
- Occupation: Politician
- Political party: PRI

Gustavo Zanatta Gasperín (born 28 January 1951) is a Mexican politician affiliated with the Institutional Revolutionary Party. In 2004–2006 he sat in the Chamber of Deputies during the 59th Congress, representing Oaxaca's first district as the substitute of Eviel Pérez Magaña.
