= 1st federal electoral district of Oaxaca =

Federal electoral district of Mexico

Oaxaca's 1st
- Electoral district of the Chamber of Deputies of Mexico

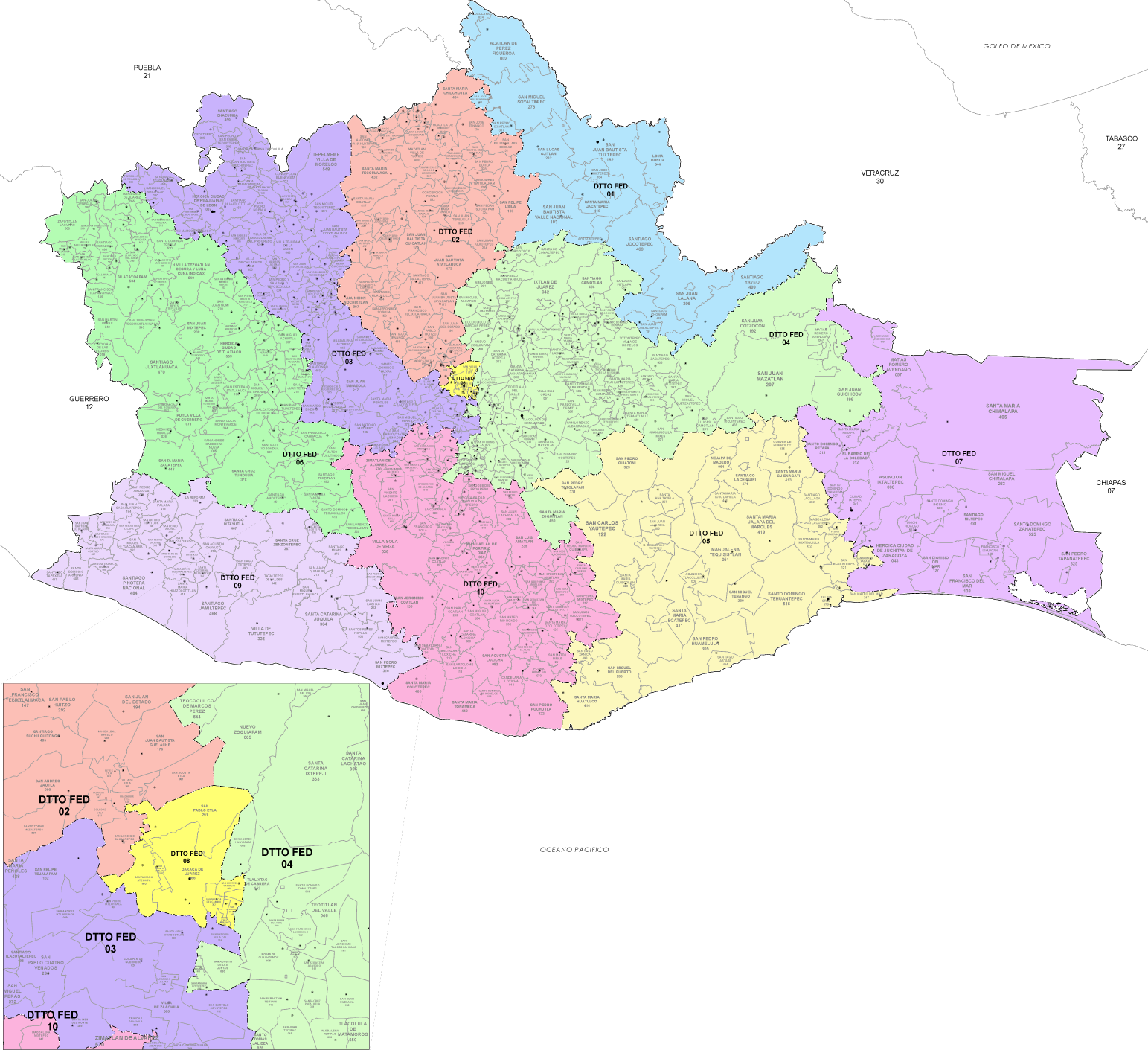
- 1st district

Incumbent
- Member: Miriam Vázquez Ruiz
- Party: ▌Morena
- Congress: 66th (2024–2027)

District
- State: Oaxaca
- Head town: San Juan Bautista Tuxtepec
- Coordinates: 18°06′N 96°07′W
- Covers: 17 municipalities
- PR region: Third
- Precincts: 257
- Population: 435,146 (2020 census)
- Indigenous: Yes (62%)

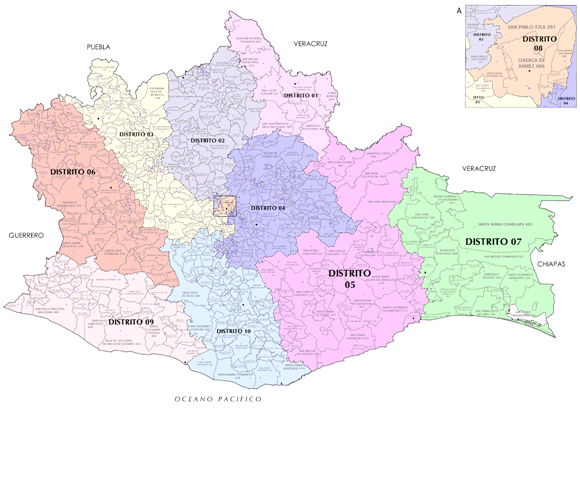
Oaxaca under the 2017–2022 districting plan

The 1st federal electoral district of Oaxaca (Spanish: Distrito electoral federal 01 de Oaxaca) is one of the 300 electoral districts into which Mexico is divided for elections to the federal Chamber of Deputies and one of 10 such districts in the state of Oaxaca.

It elects one deputy to the lower house of Congress for each three-year legislative period by means of the first-past-the-post system. Votes cast in the district also count towards the calculation of proportional representation ("plurinominal") deputies elected from the third region.

The current member for the district, elected in the 2024 general election, is Miriam de los Ángeles Vázquez Ruiz. Originally elected for the Labour Party (PT), on 19 September 2024 she announced she was joining the National Regeneration Movement (Morena).

== District territory ==
Under the 2023 districting plan adopted by the National Electoral Institute (INE), which is to be used for the 2024, 2027 and 2030 federal elections, the 1st district comprises 257 precincts (secciones electorales) across 17 of the state's municipalities in the Papaloapan region. (Note: Oaxaca accounts for 3.3% of the country's population and 4.8% of its surface area, but it contains almost a quarter of its municipalities: 570 out of 2,446 as of 2022.)

The head town (cabecera distrital), where results from individual polling stations are gathered together and tallied, is the city of San Juan Bautista Tuxtepec. The district reported a population of 435,146 in the 2020 census and, with Indigenous and Afrodescendent inhabitants accounting for over 62% of that total, it is classified by the INE as an indigenous district. (Note: The INE deems any local or federal electoral district where Indigenous or Afrodescendent inhabitants number 40% or more of the total population to be an indigenous district. In the 2023 scheme, Oaxaca's 10 federal districts and 25 local districts are all indigenous.)

== Previous districting schemes ==
Evolution of electoral district numbers
| | 1974 | 1978 | 1996 | 2005 | 2017 | 2023 |
|---|---|---|---|---|---|---|
| Oaxaca | 9 | 10 | 11 | 11 | 10 | 10 |
| Chamber of Deputies | 196 | 300 | | | | |

2017–2022
Oaxaca's 11th district was dissolved in the 2017 redistricting process. Under the 2017 to 2022 scheme, the 1st district had its head town at San Juan Bautista Tuxtepec and it covered 11 municipalities.

2005–2017
In 2005–2017, the district's head town was at San Juan Bautista Tuxtepec and it comprised 11 municipalities.

1996–2005
Between 1996 and 2017, Oaxaca's seat allocation was increased to 11. Under the 1996 districting plan, the 1st district's head town was at San Juan Bautista Tuxtepec and it comprised 10 municipalities.

1978–1996
The districting scheme in force from 1978 to 1996 was the result of the 1977 electoral reforms, which increased the number of single-member seats in the Chamber of Deputies from 196 to 300. Under that plan, Oaxaca's seat allocation rose from nine to ten. The 1st district had its head town at Juchitán de Zaragoza on the Pacific coast of the Isthmus of Tehuantepec.

== Deputies returned to Congress ==
(Mexico) National parties
- Current
- PAN
- PRI
- PT
- PVEM
- MC
- Morena
- PAZ
- Somos
- Defunct or local only
- PLM
- PNR
- PRM
- PNM
- PP
- PPS
- PARM
- PFCRN
- CON
- PANAL
- PSD
- PES
- PES
- PRD

Oaxaca's 1st district
| Election | Deputy | Party | Term | Legislature |
|---|---|---|---|---|
| 1916 | Salvador González Torres | | 1916–1917 | Constituent Congress of Querétaro |
...
| 1979 | José Murat Casab | Institutional Revolutionary Party | 1979–1982 | 51st Congress |
| 1982 | Raúl Enríquez Palomec | Institutional Revolutionary Party | 1982–1985 | 52nd Congress |
| 1985 | Mario Bustillo Villalobos | Institutional Revolutionary Party | 1985–1988 | 53rd Congress |
| 1988 | José Murat Casab | Institutional Revolutionary Party | 1988–1991 | 54th Congress |
| 1991 | Porfirio Montero Fuentes | Institutional Revolutionary Party | 1991–1994 | 55th Congress |
| 1994 | Abel Trejo González | Institutional Revolutionary Party | 1994–1997 | 56th Congress |
| 1997 | Francisco Fernández Arteaga | Institutional Revolutionary Party | 1997–2000 | 57th Congress |
| 2000 | José Soto Martínez | Institutional Revolutionary Party | 2000–2003 | 58th Congress |
| 2003 | Eviel Pérez Magaña (Note: Pérez Magaña resigned his seat on 23 November 2004 and was replaced by his alternate, Zanatta Gasperín.); Gustavo Zanatta Gasperín | Institutional Revolutionary Party | 2003–2004; 2004–2006 | 59th Congress |
| 2006 | Daniel Dehesa Mora | Party of the Democratic Revolution | 2006–2009 | 60th Congress |
| 2009 | Eviel Pérez Magaña (Note: Pérez Magaña took two leaves of absence during his term and was replaced for the duration by his alternate, Avilés Álvarez.); Violeta Avilés Álvarez | Institutional Revolutionary Party | 2009–2012 | 61st Congress |
| 2012 | José Soto Martínez | Citizens' Movement (Mexico) | 2012–2015 | 62nd Congress |
| 2015 | Antonio Amaro Cancino | Institutional Revolutionary Party | 2015–2018 | 63rd Congress |
| 2018 | Irineo Molina Espinoza | National Regeneration Movement | 2018–2021 | 64th Congress |
| 2021 | Ángel Domínguez Escobar | National Regeneration Movement | 2021–2024 | 65th Congress |
| 2024 | Miriam de los Ángeles Vázquez Ruiz (Note: Originally elected for the Labour Party, Vázquez Ruiz announced she was joining Morena on 19 September 2024.) | National Regeneration Movement | 2024–2027 | 66th Congress |

== Presidential elections ==
Oaxaca's 1st district
| Election | District won by | Party or coalition | % |
|---|---|---|---|
| 2018 | Andrés Manuel López Obrador | Juntos Haremos Historia | 61.6587 |
| 2024 | Claudia Sheinbaum Pardo | Sigamos Haciendo Historia | 77.3132 |
