= Viorica =

- Pronunciation: Romanian: [vi.oˈrika]
- Gender: Female
- Language: Romanian

Origin
- Meaning: "violet"

Viorica is a Romanian female given name, derived from Romanian viorea, a violet (flower). Notable people with the name include:

- Viorica Agarici, a Romanian nurse, the chairwoman of the local Red Cross in the city of Roman during World War II and the Ion Antonescu regime
- Viorica Cortez, a Romanian-born French mezzo-soprano
- Viorica Cucereanu, a journalist from the Republic of Moldova
- Viorica Dăncilă, a Romanian politician, member of the Social Democratic Party
- Viorica Dumitru, a former Romanian sprint canoer
- Viorica Ioja, a former Romanian rowing coxswain
- Viorica Ionică, a former Romanian handball player
- Viorica Iordache, a Romanian sprint canoer
- Viorica Lepădatu, a retired Romanian rower
- Viorica Moisuc, a Romanian politician and Member of the European Parliament
- Viorica Marian, is a scientist with expertise in bilingualism and multilingualism
- Viorica Neculai, a retired Romanian rower
- Viorica Susanu, a Romanian Olympic rower
- Viorica Țigău, a Romanian heptathlete
- Viorica Țurcanu, a Romanian fencer
- Viorica Ursuleac, a Romanian operatic soprano
- Viorica Viscopoleanu, a retired Romanian Olympics long jumper

== See also ==
- Viorel, a male given name
- Viola (given name), a female given name
- Violet (given name), a female given name
- Violeta (given name), a female given name
- Violetta (given name), a female given name
- Violette (given name), a female given name
