= Violette =

Violette may refer to:

- Violette (name), given name and surname
- Violette AC, a football club based in Port-au-Prince, Haiti
- Violette (2013 film), a French drama film
- Violette (2026 film), an upcoming film directed by Jean-Pierre Jeunet
- HMS Mersham (M2709), a Royal Navy minesweeper transferred to France in 1955 and renamed Violette
- Violette or Eva Marie Veigel (1724–1822), dancer and wife of actor David Garrick

== See also ==
- Candied violets, known in France as violettes de Toulouse
- Violetta (disambiguation)
- Violeta (disambiguation)
- Violet (disambiguation)
