= Voila =

Voila or Voilà may refer to:

== Music ==
=== Albums ===
- Voila (album), by Belinda Carlisle, 2007
- Voila!, by In-Grid, 2005
- Voilá, by Françoise Hardy, 1969

=== Songs ===
- "Voilà" (Barbara Pravi song), 2020
- "Voilà" (Elettra Lamborghini song), 2026
- "Voila", by Death Grips from The Powers That B, 2015
- "Voilà", by Françoise Hardy from Ma jeunesse fout le camp..., 1967
- "Voila", by Radio Killer, 2009

== Others ==
- Voilà!, an unadapted borrowing from French meaning "here it is!" or "look at this!", used to call attention to something that has just been done or explained
- Voilà, also known as Comcel Haiti, a phone company in Haiti
- La belle que voilà, a novel by Louis Hémon
- Voila, Brașov, a commune in Romania
- Voilà, formerly known as AMICUS, is the Union catalog for library materials in Canada.
- Voilà, a Canadian grocery delivery service owned by Sobeys

== See also ==
- Viola (disambiguation)
