= Violette (name) =

- Pronunciation: French: [vjɔlɛt]
- Gender: Female
- Language: French

Origin
- Meaning: "violet"

Violette is a female given name and a surname which may refer to:

== Given name ==
- Violette Neatley Anderson (1882–1937), American lawyer
- Violette Cordery (1900–1983), British racing driver
- Violette Cornelius (1918–1998), 20th century Dutch photographer
- Violette Dorange (born 2001), French offshore sailor
- Violette Huck (born 1988), French tennis player
- Violette Impellizzeri (born 1977), Italian astronomer and astrophysicist
- Violette Lafleur, Canadian conservator and curator
- Violette Lecoq (1912–2003), French nurse, illustrator and resistance member during World War II
- Violette Leduc (1907–1972), French author
- Violette Malan (born 1956), Canadian editor and fantasy writer
- Violette Mbenza, DR Congolese footballer
- Violette Mège (1889–1968), Algerian artist
- Violette Morris (1893–1944), French multi-sport athlete, and spy and collaborator for the Germans during World War II
- Violetta Napierska (1890–1968), sometimes spelled Violette, actress in German silent films
- Violette Nozière (murderer) (1915–1966), French convicted murderer
- Violette Rigollet (1930–1991), Swiss tennis player
- Violette Khairallah Safadi (born 1981), Lebanese television anchor
- Violette Spillebout (born 1972), French politician
- Violette Szabo (1921–1945), British Second World War agent in German-occupied France
- Violette Trépanier (born 1945), Canadian politician
- Violette Verdy (1933–2016), French ballerina and director of dance companies
- Violette Wautier (born 1993), Thai singer-songwriter and actress

== Surname ==
- Banks Violette (born 1973), American artist
- Cyndy Violette (born 1959), American poker player
- Dave Violette (born 1963), American curler
- Lorne J. Violette (1884–?), Canadian politician
- Tom Violette (born 1960), American curler

== Nickname ==
- Eva Marie Veigel (1724–1822), dancer and the wife of actor David Garrick

== Fictional characters ==
- Violette Honfleur, in the 1980 Peanuts film Bon Voyage, Charlie Brown (and Don't Come Back!!)
- Title character of Violette Nozière, a 1978 French crime film

== See also ==
- Violetta (given name)
- Violeta (given name)
- Violet (given name)
- Viola (given name)
- Viorica, a female given name
- Le roman de la violette ("The Romance of the Violet"), a medieval poem by Gerbert de Montreuil
- La Violette, comic opera by Michele Carafa, 1828
