= The Jackal of Nar =

Novel by American writer John Marco

The Jackal of Nar is a novel by American writer John Marco, published in 1999. It belongs to the fantasy genre, but includes some elements of science fiction. The story centers on the main character of Richius Vantran, prince of the country Aramoor.

== Synopsis ==
The main character is the brave yet sensitive General Richius Vantran. Ordered by the Emperor to halt a revolt by a religious faction, Vantran's success wins him both Imperial favor and a wife—though neither sits well with him. For in battle, he fell in love with a member of the very religious faction he put down. Torn between duty and passion, Vantran surprises himself by choosing to love the enemy, and march against his old companions.
