= Aleksandr Kiss =

Aleksandr Nikolayevich Kiss (Russian: Александр Николаевич Кисс; October 2, 1921 – November 18, 1990) was a Soviet circus artist, juggler and director. People's Artist of the RSFSR (1969).

== Biography ==
He was born in Baku in a family of old circus performers, a representative of the Kiss circus dynasty. His grandfather Aleksandr Genrikhovich Kiss (1879-1942), a Czech by birth, was a clown and animal trainer who began his circus activities in the late 1890s, and in 1915-1928 was the director of the circus in Kyiv. His father Nikolai Aleksandrovich Kiss (1897-1972) was a clown, rider, juggler and director. His mother Emma Kiss (née Ciniselli) was one of the descendants of Gaetano Ciniselli (1815-1881) of the famed Ciniselli Circus dynasty.

From the age of 5 he participated in pantomimes, at the age of 8 he was already working in his father's group number "Bor-kiss". In 1939-1966 he performed in a duet with his younger sister Violetta Kiss (1925-1994). Together they became prominent artists of the Soviet and world circus. They were the first to unite record-breaking stunts of three genres at once in one number: juggling, antipodism (foot juggling) and equilibristics. Since 1967, he performed with V. Demina.

He was the author of many tricks and combinations, his signature trick - juggling five clubs behind his back is considered the benchmark for professional jugglers. Since 1975, he worked as a chief director of the creative workshop of the All-Union Directorate, and since 1988 he was the head of the artistic department of the central office of the All-Union Association "Soyuzgostsirk".

He died on November 18, 1990, in Moscow and was buried at Khimki Cemetery with his sister Violetta.

=== Family ===
- Son - circus artist Nikolai Aleksandrovich Kiss (1953-2005), juggler. Graduated from the State University of Economics and Management in 1973. In 1981 with his wife Valentina Viktorovna Chudova (born 1953) he produced an original number "Prima Donna and Juggler". He was the artistic director of the GUSCI.
- Son - circus performer Aleksandr Aleksandrovich Kiss (born 1957).

== Awards and honors ==
- Winner of the Rastelli International Jugglers Competition in Bergamo (1969)
- Honored Artist of the RSFSR (October 15, 1958)
- People's Artist of the RSFSR (1969)
- Order of the Red Banner of Labour (February 14, 1980)

== Bibliography ==
- Кисс А. Н. «Если ты — жонглёр». М., 1971.
