= Violeta (given name) =

- Pronunciation: Greek: [vjoˈleta] Romanian: [vi.oˈleta] Spanish: [bjoˈleta]
- Gender: Female
- Language: Albanian, Bulgarian, Greek, Lithuanian, Romanian, Serbian, Spanish, Portuguese

Origin
- Meaning: "violet"

Violeta (Cyrillic: Виолета, romanized: Violeta, Greek: Βιολέτα, romanized: Violéta) is a female given name. Notable people with the name include:

- Violeta Alexandru (born 1975), Romanian politician
- Violeta Andrei (born 1941), Romanian actress
- Violeta Autumn (1930–2012), Peruvian—American architect
- Violeta Avilés Álvarez (born 1957), Mexican politician
- Violeta Ayala (born 1978), Bolivian film director, producer and writer
- Violeta Bermúdez (born 1961), Peruvian lawyer, writer and diplomat
- Violeta Bernotaitė (born 1965), Lithuanian rower
- Violeta Bulc (born 1964), Slovenian politician
- Violeta Burhan (born 2002), Indonesian singer, actress and former member of JKT48
- Violeta Chamorro (1929–2025), Nicaraguan political leader, president and publisher
- Violeta de Outono, Brazilian progressive rock band
- Violeta Delgado (born 1996), Peruvian volleyball player
- Violeta Dinescu (born 1953), Romanian composer, pianist and professor
- Violeta Friedman (1930–2000), Roman holocaust survivor, activist and author
- Violeta Giménez (born 1978), Spanish rhythmic and acrobatic gymnast
- Violeta Gindeva (1946–2019), Bulgarian actress
- Violeta Granera (born 1952), Nicaraguan sociologist
- Violeta Guzmán (born 1977), Mexican hammer thrower
- Violeta Hemsy de Gainza (1929–2023), Argentine pianist
- Violeta Isfel (born Ana Fanni Portolatin, 1985), Mexican actress and singer
- Violeta Ivanov (born 1967), Moldovan politician
- Violeta G. Ivanova, Bulgarian astronomer
- Violeta Ivković, Serbian journalist and writer
- Sati (Lithuanian singer) (Violeta Jurkonienė) (born 1976), Lithuanian singer
- Violeta Lagunes Viveros (born 1971), Mexican politician
- Violeta Lastakauskaitė (born 1965), Lithuanian rower
- Violeta Laužonytė (born 1955), Lithuanian textile artist
- Violeta Luna (born 1943), Ecuadorian poet, novelist, essayist, professor and literary critic
- Violeta Lutovac Đurđević, Serbian politician
- Violeta Manushi (1926–2007), Albanian actress
- Violeta Marcos (1937–2001), Catholic Filipino Augustine nun
- Violeta Maslarova (1925–2006), Bulgarian artist
- Violeta Menjívar (born 1952), Salvadoran politician
- Viki Miljković (Violeta "Viki" Miljković) (born 1974), Serbian singer
- Violeta Mițul (1997–2023), Moldovan footballer
- Violeta Ninova (born 1963), Bulgarian rower
- Violeta Ocokoljić, Serbian politician
- Violeta Parra (1917–1967), Chilean composer, songwriter, folklorist, ethnomusicologist and visual artist
- Violeta Retamoza (born 1983), Mexican professional golfer
- Violeta Riaubiškytė-Tarasovienė (born 1974), Lithuanian musical artist
- Violeta Rivas (1937–2018), Argentine singer
- Violeta Sekuj (1931–2025), Albanian actress
- Violeta Slović (born 1991), Serbian football defender
- Violeta Spirovska, Macedonian footballer
- Violeta Strămăturaru (born 1988), Romanian luger
- Violeta Szekely (born 1965), Romanian former middle distance runner
- Violeta Tarasovienė (born 1974), Lithuanian singer and show host
- Violeta Tomić (born 1963), Slovenian left-wing politician
- Violeta Tsvetkova (born 1955), Bulgarian middle distance runner
- Violeta Urmana (born 1961, Violeta Urmanavičiūtė), Lithuanian operatic soprano
- Violeta Urtizberea (born 1985), Argentine actress
- Violeta Vidaurre (1928–2021), Chilean actress
- Violeta Vuković (born 1972), Serbian basketball player
- Violeta Zareva (born 1968), Bulgarian rower
- Violeta Zúñiga (1933–2019), Chilean human rights activist

== See also ==
- Violetta (given name), a female given name
- Violette (given name), a female given name
- Violet (given name), a female given name
- Viola (given name), a female given name
- Viorica, a female given name
- Eta (given name), a female given name
