= John Marco =

American author of fantasy fiction

- Born: Long Island, New York, U.S.
- Occupation: Author
- Writing career
- Genre: Fantasy

John Marco is an American author of fantasy fiction. His work falls into two main series: Tyrants and Kings, and The Inhumans (which is often also called the Lukien/Bronze Knight series, in reference to the main character).

== Biography ==
Marco was born and raised on Long Island, New York. He worked as a technical writer in the aviation, medical technology, software, and home security industries. In 1994, while employed as a technical writer for a computer software company, he began writing The Jackal of Nar, which was published in 1999.

== Bibliography ==
=== Skylords ===
- Starfinder (DAW Books|2009)

=== The Bronze Knight series ===
- The Eyes of God (DAW Books|2001)
- The Devil's Armor (DAW Books|2003)
- The Sword of Angels (DAW Books|2005)
- The Forever Knight (DAW Books|2013)

=== The Tyrants and Kings trilogy ===
- The Jackal of Nar (Bantam Spectra|1999)
- The Grand Design (Bantam Spectra|2000)
- The Saints of the Sword (Bantam Spectra|2001)
