= José Soto Martínez =

Mexican politician (born 1946)

- Born: 15 March 1946 (age 80); Jaral del Progreso, Guanajuato, Mexico
- Occupation: Deputy
- Political party: MC

José Soto Martínez (born 15 March 1946) is a Mexican politician affiliated with the Convergence. In the 2012 general election he was elected to the Chamber of Deputies to represent the first district of Oaxaca. He had previously represented the same district for the Institutional Revolutionary Party (PRI) from 2000 to 2003.
