= DAW Books =

American science fiction and fantasy publisher

- Parent company: Astra Publishing
- Founded: 1971; 55 years ago
- Founder: Donald A. Wollheim; Elsie B. Wollheim
- Country of origin: United States
- Headquarters location: New York City, United States
- Distribution: Penguin Random House Publisher Services
- Key people: Elizabeth R. Wollheim; Sheila E. Gilbert
- Publication types: Books
- Fiction genres: Science fiction, fantasy, horror
- Official website: dawbooks.com

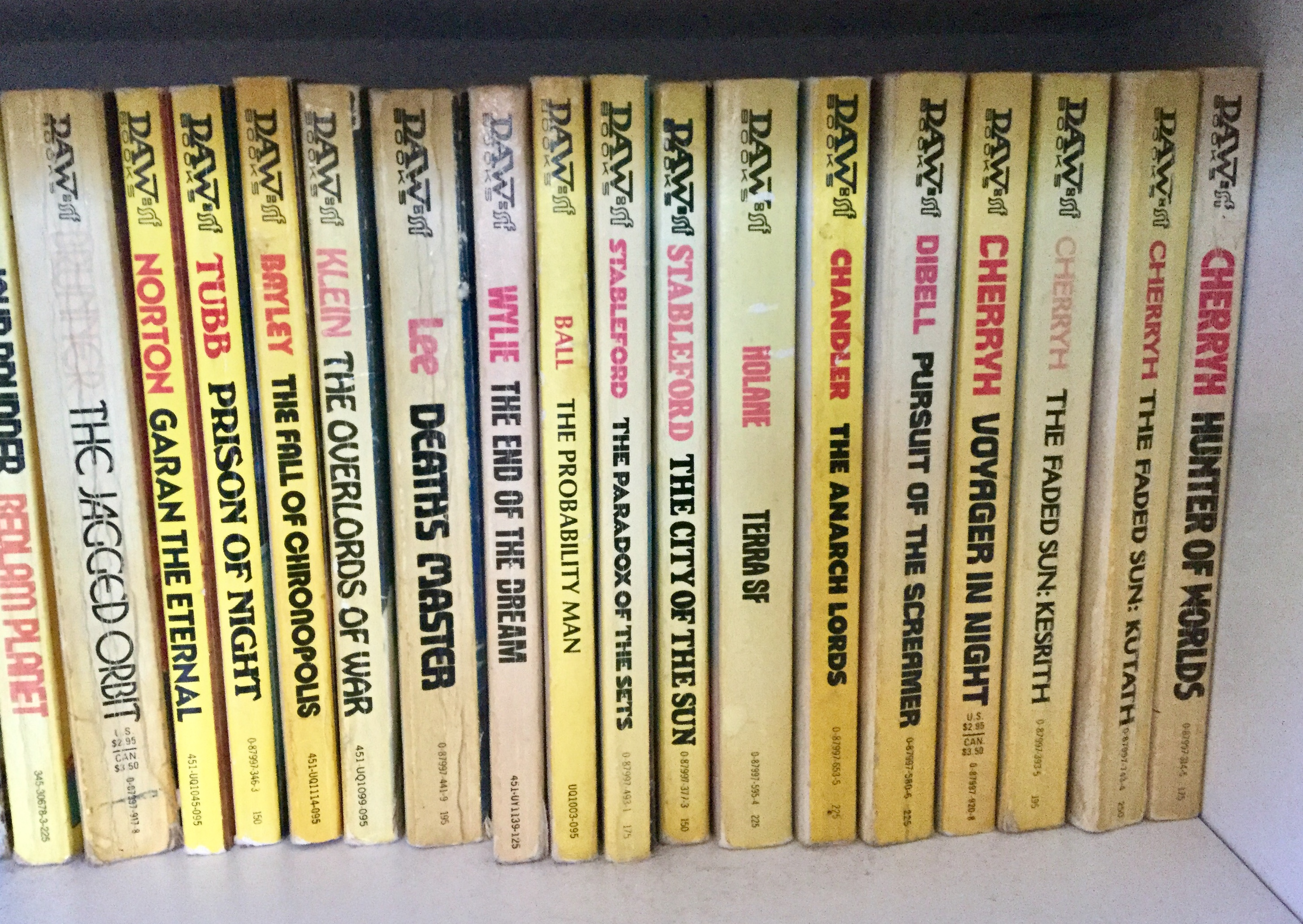
Paperback books published by DAW

DAW Books is an American science fiction and fantasy publisher, founded by Donald A. Wollheim, with his wife, Elsie B. Wollheim, following his departure from Ace Books in 1971. The company claims to be "the first publishing company ever devoted exclusively to science fiction and fantasy." The first DAW Book published was the 1972 short story collection Spell of the Witch World by Andre Norton.

== Overview ==
In its early years under the leadership of Wollheim and his wife Elsie, DAW gained a reputation of publishing popular, though not always critically acclaimed, works of science fiction and fantasy. Nevertheless, in the 1970s the company published numerous books, most of these paperback originals, by award-winning authors such as Marion Zimmer Bradley, Fritz Leiber, Jerry Pournelle, and Roger Zelazny. In 1982, C. J. Cherryh's Downbelow Station became the first DAW book to win the Hugo Award for best novel.

Until June 1984, all DAW books were characterized by yellow spines, and a prominent yellow cover box containing the company's logo as well as a chronological publication number. When the design was changed, the chronological number was retained, but moved to the copyright page and renamed the DAW Collectors' Book Number.

DAW has a distribution relationship with Penguin Group and was headquartered in Penguin USA's offices in New York City. DAW is editorially independent and, until 2022, was closely held by its current publishers, Betsy Wollheim (Donald's daughter) and Sheila E. Gilbert.

In July 2022, DAW was acquired by Astra Publishing House.

== Partial list of authors ==
- Ben Aaronovitch
- Saladin Ahmed
- Camille Bacon-Smith
- Bradley Beaulieu
- Marion Zimmer Bradley
- Kristen Britain
- John Brunner
- Kenneth Bulmer
- Lin Carter
- A. Bertram Chandler
- C. J. Cherryh
- Julie Czerneda
- Philip K. Dick
- Emily Drake
- Suzette Haden Elgin
- Kate Elliott
- Jane Fancher
- M. A. Foster
- C. S. Friedman
- Kathleen O'Neal Gear and W. Michael Gear
- David Gerrold
- ElizaBeth Gilligan
- Tracy Hickman
- Jim C. Hines
- Tanya Huff
- Katharine Kerr
- Gini Koch
- Mercedes Lackey
- Laura Lam
- Tanith Lee
- Fritz Leiber
- Stephen Leigh
- Edward Llewellyn
- Karen Lord
- Violette Malan
- John Marco
- Marshall Ryan Maresca
- Seanan McGuire
- R. M. Meluch
- Lisanne Norman
- Nnedi Okorafor
- Fiona Patton
- Melanie Rawn
- Mickey Zucker Reichert
- Laura Resnick
- Mike Resnick
- Jennifer Roberson
- Deborah J. Ross
- Patrick Rothfuss
- Diana Rowland
- Christopher Ruocchio
- Sean Russell
- Michelle Sagara (a.k.a. Michelle West)
- Sherwood Smith
- John Steakley
- S. Andrew Swann
- Margaret Weis
- Tad Williams
- Roger Zelazny
