= Daniel Dehesa Mora =

Mexican politician (born 1950)

- Born: 9 October 1950 (age 75); Oaxaca, Mexico
- Occupation: Politician
- Political party: PRD

Daniel Dehesa Mora (born 9 October 1950) is a Mexican politician affiliated with the Party of the Democratic Revolution (PRD). In the 2006 general election, he was elected to the Chamber of Deputies to represent the first district of Oaxaca during the 60th Congress.
