= Violetta (given name) =

- Pronunciation: Italian: [vjoˈletta]
- Gender: Female
- Language: Italian; Spanish

Origin
- Meaning: "violet"

Violetta is a female given name. Notable people with the name include:

- Violetta (performer) (1907–1973), real name Aloisia Wagner, German performer born without arms and legs
- Violetta Khrapina Bida (born 1994), Olympic épée fencer
- Violetta Blue, a name previously used by the American pornographic actress now known as Noname Jane
- Violetta Bock (born 1987), German politician
- Violetta Bovt (1927–1995), Russian-American ballet dancer
- Violetta Caldart (born 1969), Italian curler
- Violetta Egorova (born 1969), Russian pianist
- Violetta Elvin (1924–2021), Russian prima ballerina
- Violetta Ferrari (1930–2014), Hungarian actress
- Violetta Ignatyeva (born 2002), Russian discusses thrower
- Violetta J'Adore (born 1996), Greek Cypriot drag queen based in London
- Violetta Kiss (1925–1994), Soviet acrobat, juggler, director and teacher
- Violetta Kolesnikova (1938–2022), Russian animator
- Violetta Kolobova (born 1991), Russian fencer
- Violetta Maloney Halpert (1919–2009), American folklorist
- Violetta Napierska (1890–1968), Italian film actress, also active in German silent films
- Violette Nozière (murderer) (1915-1966), French criminal accused of attempting to poison her parents
- Violetta Oblinger-Peters (born 1977), German-born, Austrian slalom canoer
- Violetta Parisini (born 1980), Austrian singer
- Violetta Quesada (1947–2024), Cuban retired sprinter
- Violetta Schurawlow (born 1986), German actress
- Violetta Sierova (born 2007), Ukrainian pair slater
- Violetta Thurstan (1879–1978), English nurse and weaver
- Violetta Villas (1938–2011), Polish singer and actress
- Violetta White Delafield (1875–1949), American amateur mycologist
- Violetta Zironi (born 1995), Italian singer

Fictional characters

- Violetta Valéry, main role in Verdi's opera La traviata
- Violetta Salazar, the late Mexican mother of the titular character of Generator Rex
- Violetta Castillo, the titular protagonist of the Argentine Disney Channel telenovela Violetta (2012–2015)

== See also ==
- Viola (given name)
- Violet (given name)
- Violeta (given name)
- Violette (given name)
