= Gopher Count =

Community festival on Viola, Minnesota

Coordinates: 44°3′48″N 92°16′1″W

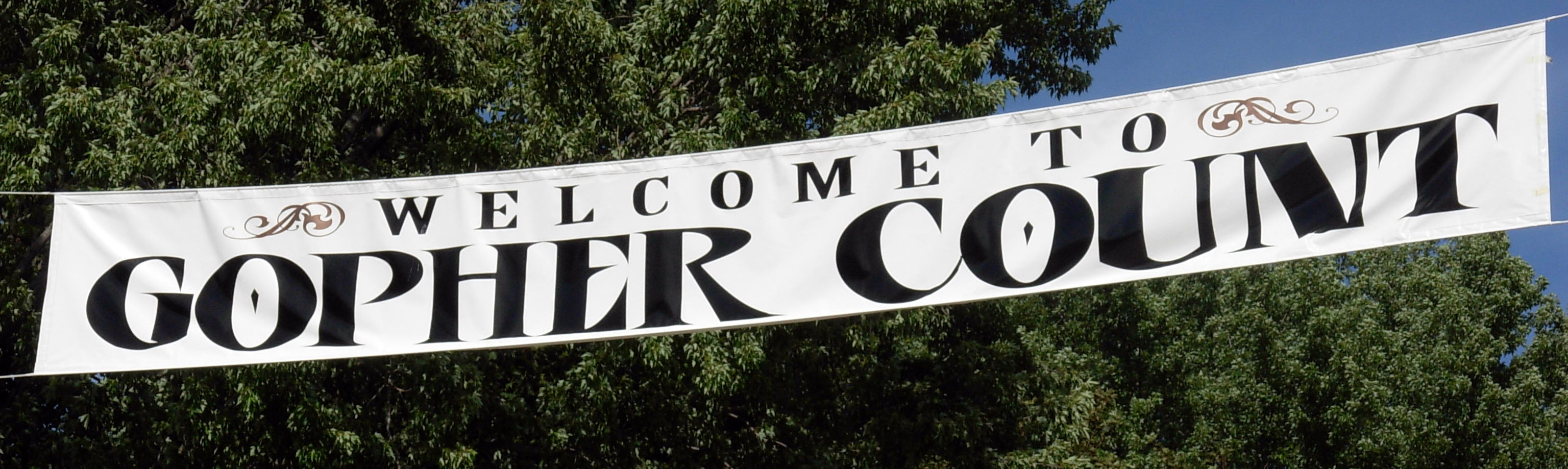
A Gopher Count banner

The Gopher Count is an annual community festival held in Viola, Minnesota, United States. Since 1874, the event has been on the third Thursday in June. Some the events include a parade, a tractor show, a nail-driving contest (women only), a pie-eating contest, fireworks, and dancing.

The festival is named for the practice of collecting a bounty on killed gophers, still paid by the township as of 2009, though other aspects of the festival are more actively promoted.

Since 2024, Gopher Count's official Facebook page states that Gopher Count is "the oldest celebration in Minnesota and the longest consecutive celebration in the US!" However, both claims are false. Stiftungsfest, which began in 1861, is Minnesota's oldest celebration and is thirteen years older than Gopher Count.
