= Violet (given name) =

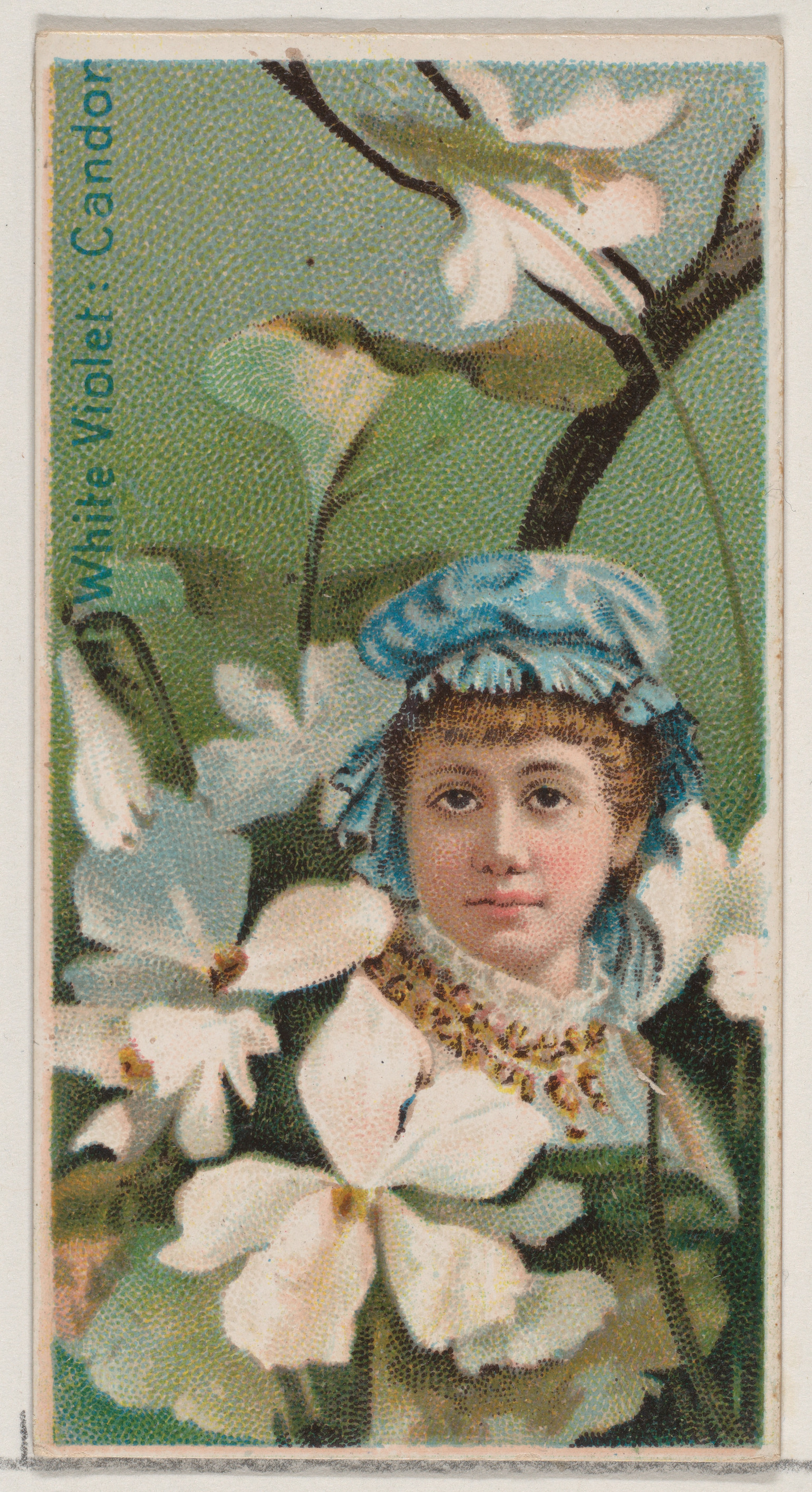
- A white violet is said to signify candor in the language of flowers.
- Pronunciation: /ˈvaɪələt/
- Gender: Female

Origin
- Meaning: "violet"

Violet is a female given name which comes from the eponymous flower. As with other such names, its popularity has varied dramatically over time. Flower names were commonly used from about 1880 through about 1910 in the United States, with usage dropping throughout the next 80 years or so; Violet was the 88th most frequent girls' given name in 1900, dropping below position 1000 by 1960. In 1990, the name appeared again in the top 1000 at position 289 and subsequently increased in popularity. It was the 20th most used name for newborn American girls in 2022. It rose rapidly in popularity for American girls born that year, one of several fashionable names that contain a letter v. In 2022, it was the 27th most popular name given to girls in Canada.

The cognates in other languages are Viola, Violeta, Violetta, or Violette. These are common girls' given names, whose popularity varies by time and country.

== Name variants ==
- Violet – English, Indonesian
- Violette – French, English
- Violetta – Indonesian, Italian, Belgian, Dutch
- Viola – Indonesian, Latin, English, Italian, German, Swedish
- Violeta – Indonesian, Spanish, Greek, Portuguese, Romanian, Lithuanian, Albanian
- Виолета / Violeta – Serbian
- Виолета (Violeta) – Bulgarian
- Віолетта (Violetta) or Віолета (Violeta) - Ukrainian
- Виолетта (Violetta) or Виолета (Violeta) – Russian
- Βιολέττα (Violetta) or Βιολέτα (Violeta) – Greek
- Wioleta, Wiola, Wioletta or Violetta – Polish
- Ia - Hebrew

== People ==
- Violet Aitken (1886–1987), British suffragette who was force-fed
- Violet A. Akurut (born 1976), Ugandan politician and teacher
- Violet Alford (1881–1972), British dancer
- Violet Alva (1908–1969), Indian lawyer, politician and deputy chair of the Rajya Sabha, and Indian National Congress member
- Violet Apisah (born 2000), Australian-Papuan tennis player
- Violet Archer (1913–2000), Canadian composer, teacher, pianist, organist, and percussionist
- Violet Astor (1889–1965), English aristocrat
- Violet Attlee (1895–1964), English wife of British Prime Minister Clement Attlee
- Violet Baddeley (1902–1989), badminton player
- Violet Banda, Malawian activist
- Violet Banks (1896–1985), Scottish artist
- Violet Barasa (1975–2007), Kenyan volleyball player
- Violet Barbour (1884–1968), American historian
- Violet Barclay (1922–2010), American illustrator
- Violet Barungi (born 1943), Ugandan writer and editor
- Violet Bathurst, Lady Apsley (1895–1966), British Conservative Party politician
- Violet Benson (born 1988), Russian-born American Internet personality
- Violet Bepete (born 1990), Zimbabwean footballer
- Violet Berlin (born 1968), British television presenter, producer and scriptwriter
- Violet Bidwill Wolfner (1900–1962), owner of the Chicago / St. Louis Cardinals of the National Football League (NFL)
- Violet Biever (1911–2010), American politician
- Violet Bland (1863–1940), English suffragette and hotelier
- Violet Blue (author), American writer and sex educator
- Violet Bonham Carter (1887–1969), British politician and diarist
- Violet Bowring (1890–1980), New Zealand artist
- Violet Brand (1929–2020), British educator and author
- Violet Brooke-Hunt, English writer and social worker
- Violet Brown (1900–2017), Jamaican supercentenarian
- Violet Brunton (1878–1951), English artist
- Violet Cameron (1862–1919), English actress and singer
- Violet Carson (1898–1983), British actress of radio and television, and a singer and pianist
- Violet Chachki (born 1992), American drag queen, burlesque dancer, recording artist, TV personality, and model
- Violet Charlesworth (1884–after 1912), British fraudster
- Violet Clark (1896–1974), American screenwriter
- Violet Cliff (1916–2003), British pair skater
- Violet Clifton (1883–1961), English writer
- Violet CoCo, Australian climate activist
- Violet Cowden (1916–2011), American aviator
- Violet Mary Craig Roberton (1888–1954), Scottish politician
- Violet Cressy-Marcks (1895–c. 1970), British explorer
- Violet Crowther (1884–1969), British museum curator
- Violet Dandridge (1878–1956), American scientific illustrator, painter, naturalist, and suffragist
- Violet Dias Lannoy (1925–1973), Mozambique-born Goan writer and teacher
- Violet Dickson (1896–1991), wife of British colonial administrator H. R. P. Dickson
- Violet M. Digby (1900–1960), British artist
- Violet Douglas-Pennant (1869–1945), British philanthropist and supporter of local government
- Violet Dreschfeld, British artist
- Violet Duca (born 1958), Turkish volleyball player and manager
- Violet Elliott (1899–1977), Australian comedian
- Violet Elton (died 1969), English badminton player
- Violet Englefield (1881–1946), British actress and singer
- Violet Fane, pen name of Lady Mary Montgomerie Currie (1843–1905), British poet, writer, and ambassadress
- Violet Farebrother (1888–1969), English film actress
- Violet L. Fisher (born 1939), American Methodist bishop
- Violet Fuller (1920–c. 2006), British artist
- Violet Gibson (1876–1956), Irish aristocrat, attempted assassin of Benito Mussolini
- Violet Gillett (1898–1996), Canadian painter and educator
- Violet Gordon-Woodhouse (1872–1948), British musician
- Violet Graham (1890–1967), English stage and film actress
- Violet Grantham (1893–1983), British politician
- Violet Grohl (born 2006), American musician
- Violet B. Haas (1926–1986), American applied mathematician
- Violet Hackbarth (1919–1988), American baseball player
- Violet Hamilton (1949–2014), photographer who lived and worked in Australia, the US, and the UK
- Violet Heming (1895–1981), English stage and screen actress
- Violet Henry-Anderson (1882–1935), Scottish-born golfer and partner of poet Elsa Gidlow
- Violet Hensley (1916–2026), American luthier and fiddler
- Violet Herbert, Countess of Powis (1865–1929), British peer
- Violet Hill Whyte (1897–c. 1980), American law enforcement officer
- Violet Holden (1873–?), English artist and book illustrator
- Violet Hopkins (born 1973), American painter
- Violet Hopson (1887–1973), British actress
- Violet Hunt (1862–1942), British writer
- Violet Rosemary Strachan Hutton (1925–2004), Scottish geophysicist and pioneer of magnetotellurics
- Violet Jacob (1863–1946), Scottish writer
- Violet Jessop (1887–1971), Argentine survivor of three shipwrecks
- Violet A. Johnson (1870–1939), American civic leader
- Violet Key Jones (1883–1958), Irish suffragette
- Violet Kajubiri, former General Secretary of the Wildlife Clubs of Uganda, and sister of Ugandan president Yoweri Museveni
- Violet Kazue de Cristoforo (1917–2007), Japanese American poet, composer, and translator of haiku
- Violet Keene (1893–1987), English-Canadian photographer
- Violet Kemble-Cooper (1886–1961), British stage and film actress
- Violet Khoury, Israeli politician
- Violet King Henry (1929–1982), Canadian lawyer
- Violet Knights (1894–1973), American silent film actress
- Violet La Plante (1908–1984), American silent film actress
- Violet Ranney Lang (1924–1956), American poet
- Violet Annie Lee (1909–1982), mother of the Kray twins
- Violet T. Lewis (1897–1968), American businesswoman and educator
- Violet Lopez Watson (1891–1971), Jamaican American clubwoman
- Violet Loraine (1886–1956), English actress and singer
- Violet MacMillan (1887–1953), American actress
- Violet Makuto (born 1993), Kenyan volleyball player
- Violet Manners, Duchess of Rutland (1856–1937), British artist and noblewoman
- Violet Markham (1872–1959), British writer and social reformer
- Violet Florence Martin (1862–1915), Irish author
- Violet Mathye (born 1967), South African politician
- Violet May Cottrell (1887–1971), New Zealand writer, poet, and spiritualist
- Violet McAdoo (died 1961), Irish painter
- Violet McBride (born 1954), Great Britain and Ireland women's hockey player
- Violet McDougal (1893–1989), American poet
- Violet McGraw (born 2011), American actress
- Violet McNaughton (1879–1968), Canadian journalist and feminist
- Violet McNeish Kay (1914–1971), British artist
- Violet Meikle McGlashan (1872–1905), Scottish painter
- Violet Melnotte (1855–1935), British stage performer, actress-manager, and theatre owner
- Violet Mersereau (1892–1975), American stage and film actress
- Violet Meruti, South African politician
- Violet Methley (1882–1953), English children's writer
- Violet Milner, Viscountess Milner (1872–1958), English Edwardian society lady, and editor of the political monthly, National Review
- Violet Milstead (1919–2014), Canadian aviator
- Violet Mond, Baroness Melchett (1867–1945), British humanitarian and activist
- Violet Moore Higgins (1886–1967), American cartoonist, children's book illustrator and writer
- Violet Mount, Australian soprano
- Violet Myers (1875–1943), classical singer and the wife of British diplomat William Algernon Churchill
- Violet Naylor-Leyland, British fashion stylist
- Violet Needham (1876–1967), English author
- Violet Neilson (1931–2024), Jamaican politician
- Violet Nelson, Canadian actress
- Violet Nicolson (1865–1904), English poet
- Violet Oaklander (1927–2021), American child therapist and author
- Violet Oakley (1874–1961), American artist
- Violet Odogwu (born 1942), Nigerian track and field athlete
- Violet Olney (1911–1999), English athlete
- Violet Oon, Singaporean chef, restaurateur and food writer
- Violet Owen (1902–1998), British tennis and hockey player
- Violet Palmer (born 1964), American basketball referee in the NBA and WNBA
- Violet Peters, Indian track and field athlete
- Violet Phatshoane (born 1972), South African judge
- Violet Philpott (1922–2012), English puppeteer and author
- Violet Piercy (1889–1972), English long-distance runner
- Violet Pinckney (1871–1955), English tennis player
- Violet Plimmer (1885–1949), British biologist
- Violet Plummer (1873–1962), South Australian medical doctor
- Violet Powell (1912–2002), British writer and critic
- Violet Radcliffe (1904–1965), American actress
- Violet Raseboya (born 1986), South African runner
- Violet Reed, American actress
- Violet Richardson Ward (1888–1978), founder of the Berkeley Women's Gymnasium
- Violet Roche (1885–1967), New Zealand journalist and welfare worker
- Violet Rodgers (1914–1978), British museum curator
- Violet Romer (1886–1970), American dancer
- Violet Rucroft (1902–1986), New Zealand naturalist, educator and conservationist
- Violet Ryley (1884–1949), Canadian dietitian
- Violet Sampa-Bredt (1950–2015), Zambian politician
- Violet Sanders (1904–c. 1983), British artist
- Violet Semenya (born 1961), South African judge
- Violet Showers Johnson, Nigerian-American historian
- Violet Siwela (1956–2024), South African politician
- Violet Skies (born 1991), Welsh singer-songwriter
- Violet Sleigh (born 1935), the first Miss Malaya
- Violet Smith, American female jockey
- Violet Spiller Hay (1873–1969), Irish Christian Science teacher and hymnist
- Violet Stanger (1940–2023), Canadian politician
- Violet Summerhayes (1878–1974), Canadian tennis player
- Violet Synge (1896–1971), Girl Guide Chief Commissioner for England
- Violet Targuse (1884–1937), New Zealand playwright
- Violet Teague (1872–1951), Australian artist
- Violet Tillard (1874–1922), suffragette, nurse, pacifist, conscientious objector supporter, famine relief worker, and Quaker
- Violet Trefusis (1894–1972), English writer and socialite
- Violet Tweedale (1862–1936), Scottish author, poet, and spiritualist
- Violet Van der Elst (1882–1966), British entrepreneur and campaigner best known for activities against the death penalty
- Violet Vanbrugh (1867–1942), English actress
- Violet Vimpany (1886–1979), Australian painter and etcher
- Violet Walrond (1905–1996), New Zealand swimmer
- Violet Wattenberg (born 1978), Netherlands international cricketer
- Violet Webb (1915–1999), English track and field athlete
- Violet Wegner (1887–1960), British singer
- Violet Whiteman (1873–1952), English-born New Zealand artist
- Violet Wilkey (1903–1976), American child actress
- Violet Winspear (1928–1989), British writer
- Violet Wong (fl. 1916–1948), Chinese actress
- Violet Wood (1899–2012), British supercentenarian
- Violet Yong Wui Wui (born 1977), Malaysian lawyer and politician

== Fictional characters ==
- Violet (comics), a DC Comics character
- Violet, the title character from the musical Violet
- Lee Chaolan or Violet, a Tekken 4 character
- Violet Bridgerton, mother of the Bridgerton children
- Violet Crawley, Dowager Countess of Grantham, a character on Downton Abbey
- Violet Gray, a Peanuts character
- Violet Baudelaire, an A Series of Unfortunate Events character
- Violet Beauregarde, a Charlie and the Chocolate Factory character
- Violet Evergarden, the protagonist of Kana Akatsuki's Violet Evergarden (2015)
- Violet Harmon, an American Horror Story: Murder House character
- Violet Highway, an EastEnders character
- Violet Parr, The Incredibles character
- Violet Song jat Shariff, an UltraViolet character
- Violet Turner, a Private Practice character
- Violet Wilson, from the British ITV soap opera, Coronation Street
- Vi (born Violet), from the video game League of Legends, also on the TV Series Arcane
- Halo (Violet Harper), from Young Justice

== Equivalents from other cultures ==
The floral-inspired name is present in other cultures. Examples include:

- Sumire (Japanese)
- Calfuray (Mapuche)
- Ibolya (Hungarian)
- Viola (Italian; diminutive Violetta)
- Violeta (Romanian)
- Wiola (Polish; variants Wioleta, Wioletta)
- Sigal (Hebrew)
