= Violetta Parisini =

Austrian pop singer and songwriter (born 1980)

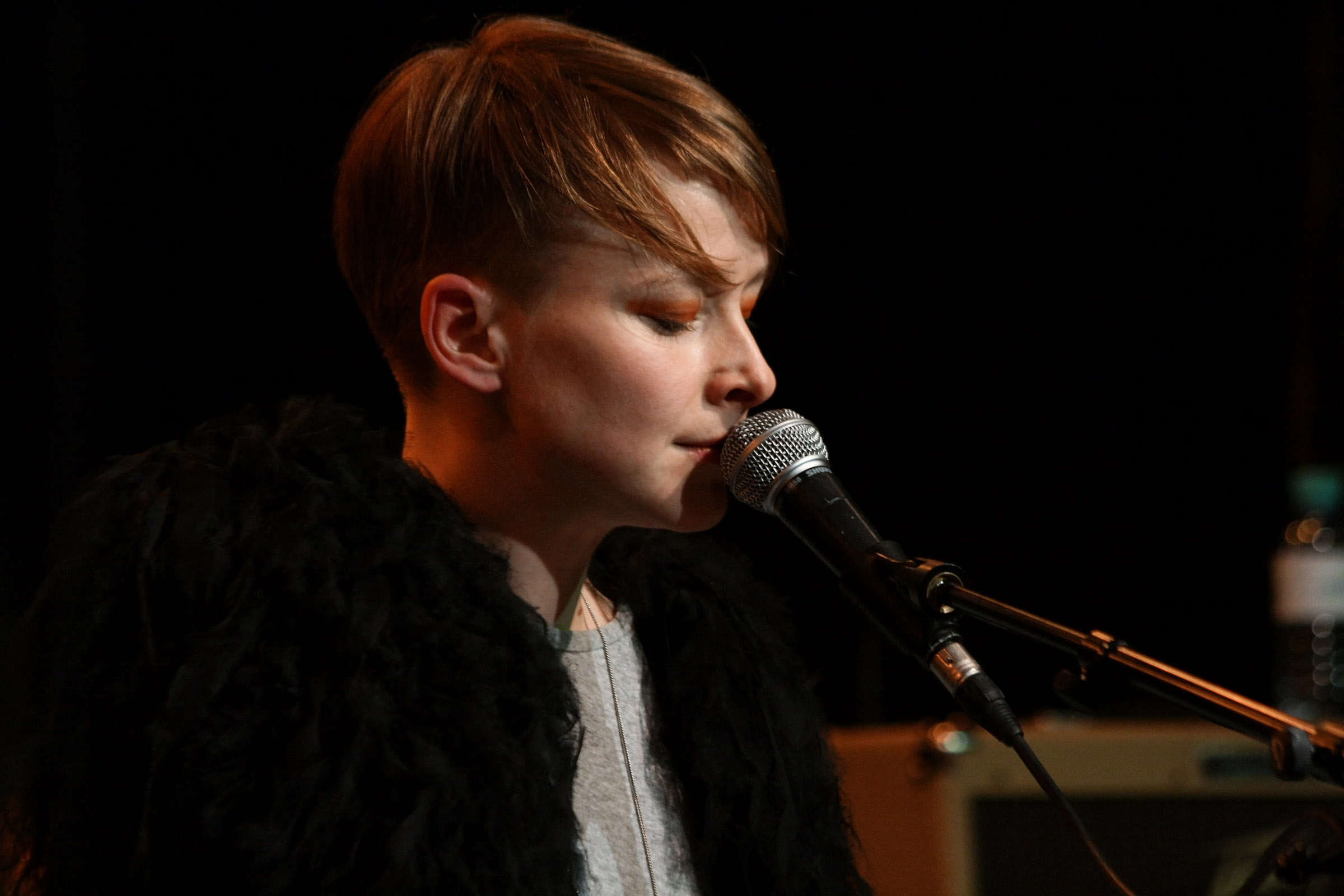
Violetta Parisini (2012)

Violetta Parisini (born in Vienna in 1980) is an Austrian pop singer and songwriter.

Parisini completed her studies in philosophy and theatre. She started working as DJ and singing in clubs in the mid-2000s, mainly in Austria and Germany and took part in various productions. She was featured in Mieze Medusa & Tenderboy song "Nicht meine Revolution" that won the Protest Song contest in 2007. After several EPs, she released her solo album on 28 May 2010 entitled Giving you my heart to mend in collaboration with musician and Florian Cojocaru. In that same year, she was nominated for Best Pop / Rock artists during the Amadeus Austrian Music Awards 2010 nominations and for the FM4 Awards. She also was featured in The24seven's "Stand Still" in 2009 Struboskop's release "Don't Stop Robot" in 2010.

She was the supporting act for Joe Cocker's tour in Austria and Germany, accompanied by a band that included Florian Cojocaru on guitar, Pohn Alex on drums, and Parisini on piano. In 2011, she was a vocalist at the singer at the Slow Club Revisited, a band project, in which Wolfgang Schlögl and Thomas Rabitsch continued the idea of their earlier group known as The Slow Club, that had stopped after the death of the project's singer Hansi Lang. This was followed by the album Open Secrets in 2012.

== Discography ==
=== Albums ===
Year	Album	Peak positions
Year	Album	AUT
2010	Giving You my Heart to Mend	52
2012	Open Secrets	23

=== EPs ===
- 2010: Stop
- 2010: Faces & People
- 2010: The Blackest Coffee
- 2010: On You
- 2011: Auf den Dächern: Violetta Parisini (live on tape.tv) (download album)
