= Violet Naylor-Leyland =

British fashion stylist

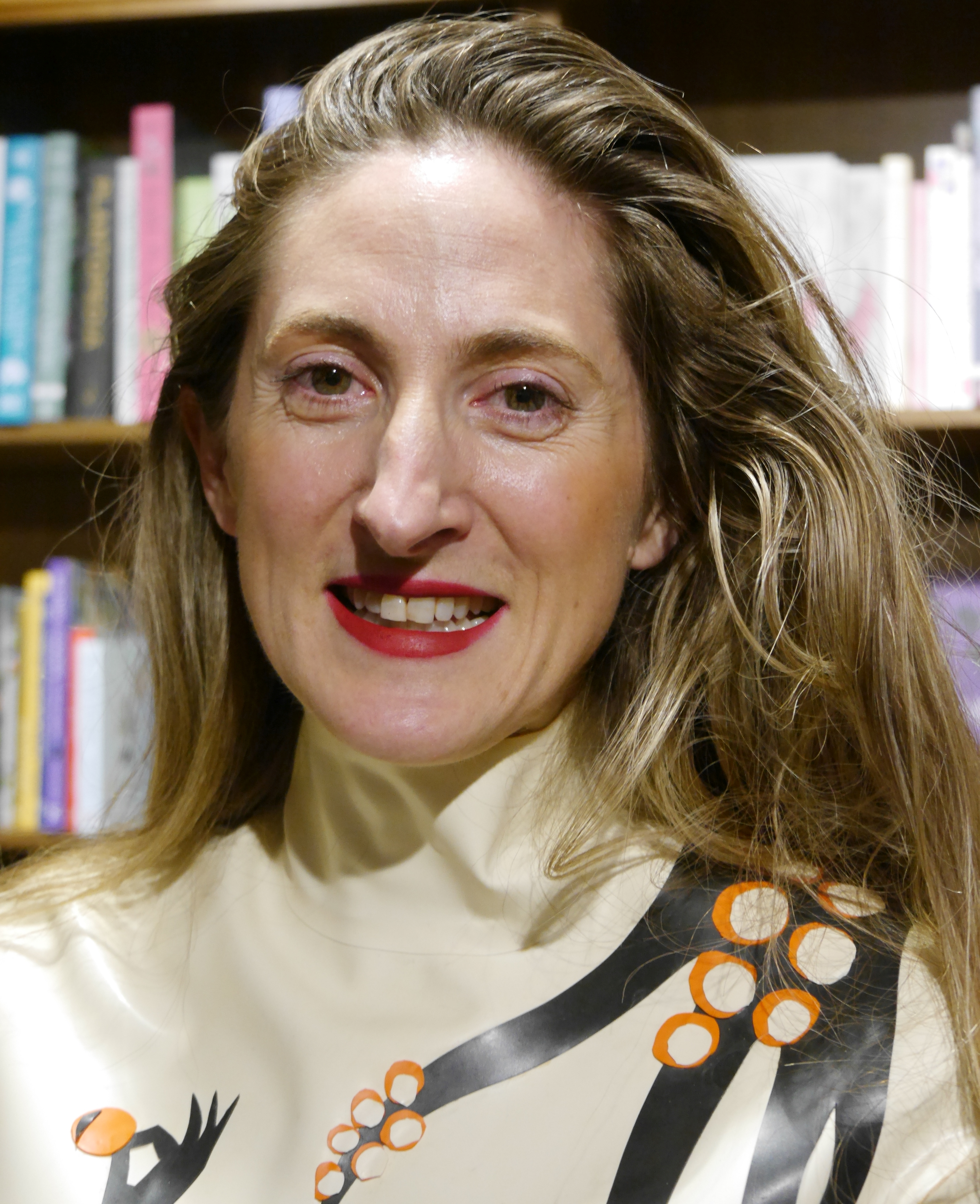
Violet Naylor-Leyland, Hatchards, Piccadilly, London, 30 November 2022

Violet Naylor-Leyland is a British fashion stylist, journalist and author.

== Early life ==
She is the daughter of Philip Naylor-Leyland and Lady Isabella Lambton, and the granddaughter of Antony Lambton.

== Career ==
Naylor-Leyland has written for publications including Vanity Fair, Tatler, Evening Standard, The Lady, and Bloomberg Businessweek.

In 2022, she published Rare Birds, True Style: Extraordinary Interiors and Signature Looks, with photography by Andrew Farrar.

== Personal life ==
In 2012, she married Charles Delacherois-Day.

== Publications ==
- Rare Birds, True Style: Extraordinary Interiors and Signature Looks, Rizzoli, 2022
