= Viola Klaiss =

American organist

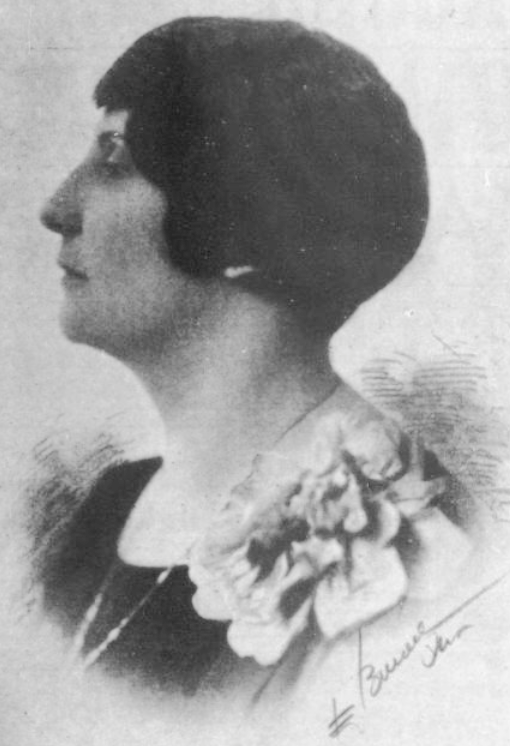
- Viola Klaiss, from a 1927 publication
- Born: Viola Frances Klaiss; August 31, 1891; Philadelphia, Pennsylvania
- Died: August 5, 1978 (aged 86); West Palm Beach, Florida
- Other names: Viola Spotts
- Occupations: Organist, pianist

Viola Frances Klaiss Spotts (August 31, 1891 – August 5, 1978) was an American organist. She was a theatre organist in Philadelphia, and made several recordings in the 1920s. She was also "leader of an all-female orchestra".

== Early life and education ==
Klaiss was born in Philadelphia, the daughter of Martin M. Klaiss and Anna Blanche Rayford Klaiss. Her father was a piano tuner and musician from Germany, and her older brother William Klaiss was a theatre organist. She appeared in concerts from childhood with the Klaiss Family Orchestra. She trained at the Leefson-Hille Conservatory in Philadelphia with Maurits Leefson, and with organists Ralph Kinder and Walter Baker.

== Career ==
Klaiss was a theatre organist in Philadelphia. "Miss Klaiss has become a recognized attraction in the theatre," reported Musical Courier in 1927, "and she attributes her success not only to what and how she plays, but to how she attires herself as well." She made several recordings for Victor in 1928, including recordings with singers Gene Austin and Nina Koshetz. She wrote for professional journals, and taught organ, piano, and music theory. After the silent film era, Klaiss led an "all-girl orchestra", the Musigals. She played at USO shows for the troops in Europe during and after World War II, on radio programs, and at hotels and clubs on the New Jersey shore. She composed songs, including "After All These Years" (1940).

Klaiss was the founding president of the Philadelphia Club of Women Organists in 1926. In her later years, she was based in Florida, where she continued as a church organist and gave recitals and concerts in the 1950s and 1960s.

== Personal life ==
Klaiss married singer Samuel Calvin Spotts in 1920. Her husband died in 1941, and she died in 1978, at the age of 87, in West Palm Beach, Florida.
