= Violeta Avilés Álvarez =

Mexican politician

- Born: 24 January 1957 (age 69); Oaxaca, Mexico
- Occupation: Politician
- Political party: PRI

Violeta Avilés Álvarez (born 24 January 1957) is a Mexican politician from the Institutional Revolutionary Party (PRI). From 2010 to 2012 she served in the Chamber of Deputies representing Oaxaca's first district.
