= Violeta Sekuj =

Albanian actress (1931–2025)

- Born: 1 March 1931; Korçë, Albania
- Died: 23 July 2025 (aged 94); Worcester, Massachusetts, U.S.
- Education: Jordan Misja Artistic Lyceum
- Occupation: Actress
- Years active: 1951–1990
- Spouse: Paulin Sekuj
- Children: 2
- Awards: Merited Artist

Violeta Sekuj (1 March 1931 – 23 July 2025) was an Albanian actress and director who appeared especially at the Migjeni Theatre in Shkodër. She was also one of the last surviving actresses from Albanian classic cinema.

== Early life ==
Sekuj was born on 1 March 1931 in Korçë. In 1952, she graduated from the Jordan Misja Artistic Lyceum high school. At the age of 19, she moved to Shkodër to join the Migjeni Theatre, becoming its first female director.

== Career ==
Sekuj’s theater career spanned decades, beginning with her debut in Goldoni’s The Servant of Two Masters as Smeraldina around 1955. She appeared in Zekthi (1964) as the heroine Jema, in Fisheku në pajë (1968) as Gjelina, and in Gjaku i Arbërit (1981).

At Migjeni Theatre, she played parts in Tractorists, The Upheaval, Tartuffe, Doll’s House, Shtatë Shaljanët, Kunora e Nurijës, and People of Our Days, often via dubbing. There, she also directed Djem të mbarë, Nora, Hekurat, Prefekti, and Kaçakët.

She organized concerts, children’s festivals and other cultural events in collaboration with the Albanian House of Culture.

On screen, Sekuj appeared in several Albanian films and TV works: Militanti (1984), Fundi i një gjakmarrjeje (1984), Flutura në kabinën time (1988) and Bregu i ashpër (1988).

== Personal life and death ==
Violeta was married to Paulin Sekuj, a stage director and co‑founder of the Migjeni Theatre's professional troupe.

Later, Sekuj emigrated to Massachusetts in the United States, to be close to family and remained active in the Albanian diaspora community. She died in Worcester on 23 July 2025, at the age of 94.
