= Viola (surname) =

Viola is surname. Notable people with the surname include:

- Al Viola (1919–2007), American jazz guitarist
- Alessio Viola (born 1990), Italian footballer
- Alfonso dalla Viola (c. 1508–c. 1573), Italian composer
- Ali Viola (born 1976), former collegiate All-American softball player
- Bill Viola (1951–2024), American video artist
- Bill Viola (martial artist) (born 1947), American martial arts instructor
- Brittany Viola (born 1987), platform diver, daughter of Frank Viola
- Domenico Viola (c. 1610-1620–1696), Italian painter
- Fernando Viola (1951–2001), Italian footballer
- Frank Viola (born 1960), baseball player and coach
- Frank Viola III (born 1984), baseball player and broadcaster, son of Frank Viola
- Giovanni Viola (1926–2008), Italian football goalkeeper
- Giovanni Battista Viola (1576–1622), Italian early Baroque painter
- John Viola (1950–2026), American politician from Delaware
- József Viola (1896–1949), Hungarian football player and coach
- Juan Violá (1883–1919), Cuban baseball player in the Cuban and Negro leagues
- Lorenza Viola, Italian physicist
- Matteo Viola (born 1987), Italian tennis player
- Nicolas Viola (born 1989), Italian footballer
- Pedro Viola (born 1983), Dominican Major League Baseball pitcher
- Roberto Eduardo Viola (1924–1994), Commander-in-Chief of the Argentine Army who was President of Argentina in 1981
- Valentín Viola (born 1991), Portuguese footballer
- Vincent Viola (born 1956), American businessman

== See also ==
- Viola (given name), female given name
