= Violette Malan =

Canadian editor and fantasy writer

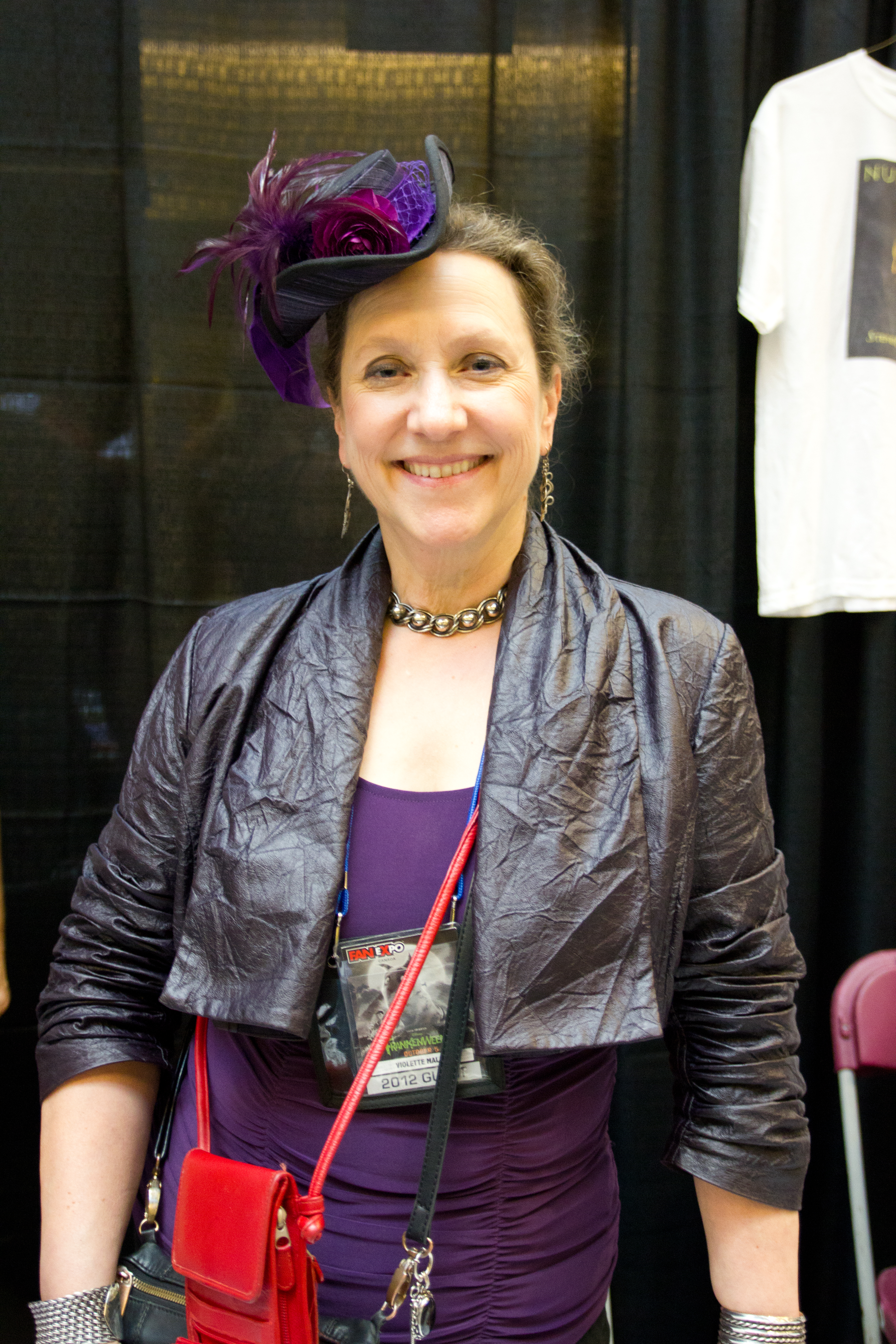
- Malan at the 2012 Fan Expo Canada

Violette Malan is a Canadian editor and fantasy writer. She has a PhD in 18th-century English literature, and has worked as a teacher and a book reviewer.

== Selected works ==
- Dead In The Water (editor with Therese Greenwood), 2006, Napoleon Publishing, ISBN 1-894917-37-5

The Mirror Prince series

1. The Mirror Prince, 2006, DAW Books, ISBN 0-7564-0339-1
2. Shadowlands , 2012, DAW, ISBN 978-0-7564-0740-7

Dhulyn and Parno series

1. The Sleeping God, 2007, DAW, ISBN 978-0-7564-0446-8
2. The Soldier King, 2008, DAW, ISBN 978-0-7564-0516-8
3. The Storm Witch, 2009, DAW, ISBN 978-0-7564-0574-8
4. Path of the Sun, 2010, DAW, ISBN 978-0-7564-0638-7
