= Viola, Minnesota =

Viola
- Unincorporated community
- Location within Minnesota Location within the United States
- Coordinates: 44°03′48″N 92°16′06″W
- Country: United States
- State: Minnesota
- County: Olmsted
- Township: Viola Township
- Elevation: 1,155 ft (352 m)
- Time zone: UTC-6 (Central (CST))
  - Summer (DST): UTC-5 (CDT)
- ZIP code: 55934
- Area code: 507
- GNIS feature ID: 653671

Viola is an unincorporated community in Viola Township, Olmsted County, Minnesota, United States. It is the site of a yearly Gopher Count festival, which began in 1874.

The community is located along Olmsted County Road 2 (Viola Road) near 105th Avenue NE and Center Street. State Highway 42 (MN 42) and Olmsted County Road 24 are also in the immediate area. Nearby places include Eyota, Elgin, and Rochester.

The North Fork of the Whitewater River flows through the community.

== History ==
Viola was platted in 1878. The community was named for Viola Buck, the wife of a settler.
