= Violetta Kiss =

Soviet acrobat, juggler, director, and teacher

Violetta Nikolaevna Kiss (22 June 1925, Yaroslavl - 9 January 1994, Moscow) was a Soviet acrobat, juggler, director, and teacher, Honored Artist of the RSFSR (1972).

== Biography ==
She was born in 1925 in Yaroslavl in the family of the circus dynasty Kiss, her grandfather Alexander Henrikhovich having been on the arena since the end of the 1890s, and her father Nikolai Alexandrovich since 1907. Violetta Nikolayevna entered the arena at the age of 7, taking part in acrobatic numbers, since 1939 she performed in a duet with her brother, Alexander Nikolayevich (People's Artist of the RSFSR). Their duo received worldwide recognition and had a significant impact on the development of the art of circus juggling. The stunts performed by the duo to this day are a difficult feat to achieve.

After thirty years of performing, she left the stage in 1966. She was planning to become a circus conductor, but on the advice of A.Voloshin, the director of the State Circus and Variety Art School, she switched to a teaching-director position. She was engaged in pedagogical activity for more than fifteen years.

Her students include: jugglers S. Ignatov, Nikolai Kiss, A. Popov, antipodist T. Puzanova, equilibrist S. Gololobova.

She graduated from the faculty of theater studies of the State Institute of Theater Art (GITIS) in 1977.
