= Violet Hamilton =

Australian photographer

Violet Hamilton (née Diane Oakley, February 1949 – July 2014) was a photographer who lived and worked in Australia, the US and the UK.

Her photographic career, which spanned some 45 years (1970–2014), covered artistic, commercial and curatorial work.

Violet was one of the students in the first Photography course at Sydney's National Art School (then East Sydney Technical College). From 1973 onwards, Violet worked as a freelance photographer, documenting the contemporary culture of a rapidly changing world – Sydney's Darlinghurst - which incubated the emerging gay, lesbian, transsexual and feminist cultures.

Post-graduate studies in Los Angeles culminated in a curatorial role with the Wilson Centre for Photography - one of the largest private collections of photographs in the world, spanning the early nineteenth century to contemporary artists.

== Early and middle life ==
Violet was born in Singapore in 1949 to Judy Oakley (née Ivy Wain) and Graham Oakley. She had three siblings, Carol, Michael and Trish. All were born in Singapore.

== Photography (1971–1980) ==
Throughout her tertiary education at the National Art School, Violet was a documentary photographer. From 1973-75, Violet was employed by Rolling Stone Australia, gaining access into the local rock and roll culture. This included not only producing album covers for bands, studio photoshoots and documenting live performances, but also candid backstage images. During her freelance photography career, Violet also documented the developing gay and avant-garde scenes in Darlinghurst, which was fast becoming a cultural playground for the arts.

=== Rock and Roll ===
Working as freelance photographer from 1973–78, Violet's work consists of a diverse collection of images from the rock and roll culture of the 1970s, surveying the subculture as a whole. As a rock and roll photographer working for Rolling Stone Australia, Violet documented the performances of up and coming Australian bands, such as Skyhooks, AC/DC, OL’55, New Finch, Hush, Dragon, Cold Chisel and Rose Tattoo. She also photographed the performances of famous international acts and those yet to be famous, playing in Australia for the first time. This included artists such as Debbie Harry of Blondie, Deep Purple, Lou Reed, Joe Cocker, the Who and many more. In 1978, Violet exhibited a collection of works in the show Rock and Roll Photography, held at The Gallery, Bondi Pavilion in Sydney.

=== The Culture of Sydney’s Darlinghurst ===
From 1971-1978, Violet's role as a documentary photographer and artist enabled her to capture the climate of political and social transformation in Sydney. In particular, Violet documented the developing LGBT scene in Darlinghurst. Living in Darlinghurst gave Violet a passport into this cultural movement, and she was privy to drag shows as well as lucrative parties, becoming friends with the Sydney dominatrix Madame Lash (a.k.a. Gretel Pinniger).

On the 24 June 1978, the Gay Rights march (Mardi Gras) was held on Oxford Street, Darlinghurst. This was the largest event of coming out for the LGBT community and a show of solidarity against the violence and brutality experienced by its members. This march was documented by Violet as it moved past Taylor Square in front of the Darlinghurst Courthouse. Not only has this event become an important part of the history of the LGBT community, it remains an integral part of Sydney's culture to the present day in the form of the annual Mardi Gras celebrations.

Being a part of the early Underground scene in Darlinghurst, Violet captured many subversive and obscure local performers such as Raats Bander and Lindsay Kemp, who traversed the boundaries between avant-garde theatre, drag performance, music and art.

=== Los Angeles (1980–1984) ===
In 1980, Violet was given the opportunity to study overseas at the University of Southern California, Los Angeles. Throughout her study she was a teaching assistant at the University as well as a part-time teacher of photography at Mount Saint Antonio College, Southern California. She graduated from the University of Southern California with a Masters in Photography and in 1984 was offered and accepted a position as a consultant for the Wilson Centre of Photography in London.

== The Wilson Centre and Julia Margaret Cameron (1997–2009) ==
During her career with the Wilson Centre, Violet undertook various research projects investigating and documenting the life and work of Julia Margaret Cameron. This included transcribing letters written by Margaret Cameron, eventually culminating in the exhibition and published catalogue Annals of My Glass House – Photographs by Julia Margaret Cameron in 1997. This exhibition toured globally and Violet continued to work with this collection throughout her life. Her research has greatly contributed to the widespread study of Julia Margaret Cameron.

In 2008, Violet curated a major survey of Julia Margaret Cameron's work, Julia Margaret Cameron, at the Wilson Centre for Photography before retiring in late 2009.

== Later life ==
From 1984 to 2009, during her role as the Senior Photography Curator at the Wilson Centre for Photography, Violet continued to lecturer on Photography, guest speaking at many conferences and symposia, including at the Royal Photographic Society, Bath; Museum of Fine Arts, Boston and J. Paul Getty Museum, Los Angeles. She continued to be a part-time teacher, teaching the history of photography, critical and contextual studies relating to photography, art and design.

During this period she met her life partner Clive Curtis a Stuntman and they began to live in and restore the historic Ellys Manor House in Great Ponton, Lincolnshire.

=== Death ===
In July 2014, Violet Hamilton died at the age of 65; Clive, two sisters and a brother, survives her. Her sister, Trish Oakley, inherited the body of her artwork and photography.

== Legacy ==
In March 2015, The Violet Hamilton Project was established by Trish Oakley. Under the supervision of Nick Shiraev and Trish Oakley, Curator Ivana Jovanovic was employed to scan, catalogue and document the Violet Hamilton Collection. The total collection consists of more than 20,000 black and white 35mm negatives, with images spanning Violet's career and life as a photographer from 1971 to 1984.

=== Further reading ===
Violet Hamilton was author and contributed to various publications:

- Annals of My Glass House - Photographs by Julia Margaret Cameron Exhibition Catalogue, University of Washington Press. 1997
- Four Eyes - Photography and Performance Essay, High Performance, Los Angeles, 1983
- Photo-Discourse - Conceptual Photography Essay, Sydney College for the Arts, 1981 Photo-Discourse - The New Wave Essay, Sydney College for the Arts, 1980
- The Garden of Earthly Delights Illustrated publication, Barcom Press, Sydney, 1976
