= Violetta season 1 =

Violetta
- Season 1
- No. of episodes: 80

Release
- Original network: Disney Channel
- Original release: 14 May – 26 October 2012

The first season of the Argentine telenovela Violetta started airing in Argentina on 14 May 2012 and ended on 26 October 2012. There were 80 episodes divided into two parts, each with 40 episodes. The first half of the season was titled Su destino es hoy (Her destiny is today), and the second remaining half was titled Violetta está cambiando (Violetta is changing).

== Plot ==
Violetta, along with her father, Germán, just got back to her hometown, Buenos Aires, after living in Europe for some years. Later, it turns out she has a passion for music, dancing and singing. But her father doesn't want her to sing after the accident that happened to her mother, María. She was a famous singer who died in a car accident during a tour commissioned by her father when Violetta was just five years old.

Germán had moved his construction business and her (Violetta) away from María's father, whom Germán blamed for María's death. However, his own recent death prompts Germán and Violetta's return.

Now, Violetta is back in Argentina with no friends and seemingly no one who understands her until one day, in the rain, she slips and literally falls into the arms of Tomás.

With the help of her new governess, Angie (who is also secretly her aunt), Violetta enrolled at Studio 21 without her father's knowledge. There, she meets her first love, makes new friends, and meets a rival, Ludmila. She keeps building up her musical talent day after day until the final show at the end of the year, where Angie manages to convince Germán, who now finally understands that singing and dancing is Violetta's passion and lets her attend Studio 21.

== Cast ==
=== Main cast ===
- Diego Ramos as Germán Castillo
- Martina Stoessel as Violetta Castillo
- Jorge Blanco as León Vargas
- Pablo Espinosa as Tomás Heredia
- Mercedes Lambre as Ludmila Ferro
- Nicolás Garnier as Andrés Calixto (Note: Calixto is his middle name. His last name is unknown.)
- Alba Rico Navarro as Natalia
- Lodovica Comello as Francesca Caviglia
- Candelaria Molfese as Camila Torres
- Facundo Gambandé as Maximiliano "Maxi" Ponte
- Simone Lijoi as Luca Caviglia
- Samuel Nascimento as Broduey
- Rodrigo Vellia as Napo
- Artur Logunov as Braco
- Clara Alonso as Ángeles "Angie" Carrara
- Florencia Benítez as Jade La Fontaine
- Joaquín Berthold as Matías La Fontaine
- Mirta Wons as Olga Patricia Peña
- Alfredo Allende as Lisandro Ramallo
- Rodrigo Pedreira as Gregorio Casal
- Pablo Sultani as Roberto "Beto" Benvenuto
- Ezequiel Rodríguez as Pablo Galindo
- Alberto Fernández de Rosa as Antonio Fernández Méndez

=== Recurring cast ===
- Ruggero Pasquarelli as Federico
- Diego Alcalá es Marotti
- Lucía Gil as Helena "Lena"
- Martín Pavlovsky as Dr. Dufré
- Nilda Raggi as Angélica Carrara
- Nikole Castillo as Andréa
- Nicole Luis as Laura
- Sami Justo as Mara
- Germán Tripel as Rafa Palmer
- Javier Nikilson as Jacinto La Fontaine
- Iara Muñoz as Agustina Heredia

== Release and reception ==
=== Broadcast ===
The series originally ran from 14 May to 26 October 2012 on Disney Channel (Latin America). It ran from 22 July 2013 to 28 August 2014 on Disney Channel (UK and Ireland). It aired from 26 August 2013 to 4 April 2014 on Disney Channel (Europe, Middle East and Africa), The season premiered on 18 October 2013 on Disney Channel (Australia and New Zealand), and on 3 March 2014 on Disney Channel (Southeast Asia)

=== Ratings ===
In Spain, the first episode received a 3.1% share or 461,000 viewers and it has increased by 93% by the end of the first season. The series is also successful in Mexico, Colombia, and Brazil for kids aged 4–11. It's also popular online, with 1 billion YouTube visits, 50 million official website visits, and over 80 million Facebook visits. The first episode in Italy received 195,973 viewers making it Disney Channel's most watched broadcast in the country. The average for each episode is 200,000 viewers. The Rai Gulp premiere had a 1% share or 272,000 viewers and the second episode received 300,000 viewers or a share of 1.34%. In the UK the show isn't very popular due to people who are unhappy with dubbed songs, but recently the score 9.5 has increased 9.8 rating and making it one of the most successful shows on Disney Channel UK.

== Episodes ==
No. overall	No. in season	Title	Original air date (Latin America)	Original air date (UK & Ireland)
Su destino es hoy (in English "Her fate is now")
1	1	"Dreams"	14 May 2012	22 July 2013
After many years of living in Madrid, Violetta returns with her father to her hometown, in Buenos Aires, where she'll begin a whole new chapter of her life.
2	2	"Chance"	15 May 2012	22 July 2013
Violetta falls in love with Tomas after he rescued her and he also falls in love with her. Violetta meets her new tutor, Angie, who actually is her aunt but Violetta doesn't know it.
3	3	"Love"	16 May 2012	23 July 2013
Violetta can't stop thinking about Tomas and follows him one day, all the way to Studio 21, where she gets a big surprise.
4	4	"Rivality"	17 May 2012	24 July 2013
Violetta gets upset after Angie got fired because she has been exposed as a liar. But Angie is rehired again. Meanwhile, Violetta doesn't feel happy when she thinks that Ludmila is Tomas' girlfriend.
5	5	"Friendly"	18 May 2012	25 July 2013
After seeing him with Ludmila, Violetta gets upset with Tomas. But Tomas is determined to convince Violetta that it's not like she's thinking and that Ludmila is really not his girlfriend.
6	6	"Studio 21"	21 May 2012	29 July 2013
Violetta convinces her father to let her have private piano lessons with Roberto Benvenuto "Beto". What Violetta doesn't tell her father is that she will be taking the lessons at Studio 21
7	7	"The shame of its life"	22 May 2012	30 July 2013
A jealous Ludmilla tries to humiliate Violetta by convincing her there is a costume party at Studio 21.
8	8	"Angie vs Jade"	23 May 2012	31 July 2013
After she showed up in an angel costume, Violetta is laughed at by the Studio's students. Leon then brought her home. In an attempt to split Violetta and Tomas up, Ludmila edits the video from her recent conversation with Tomas.
9	9	"BFF"	24 May 2012	1 August 2013
After watching the video of Tomas supposedly making fun of her, Violetta gets upset with him. Violetta is still made fun of by the Studio's students after she showed up dressed as an angel. But Violetta can count on help of her new friends and Leon.
10	10	"Music"	25 May 2012	2 August 2013
Everything between Violetta and Tomas is cleared up when Francesca, Camila, Maxi and Braco discover the full video. While working on a song for the entrance test to the Studio, Violetta and Tomas become even more closer.
11	11	"You and me"	28 May 2012	5 August 2013
Now with the entrance test quickly approaching, Ludmila tries to sabotage Violetta's new friendship with Tomas by pretending that he's kissing her. Other than Violetta and Ludmila, there's one girl who also likes Tomas and it's his best friend, Francesca.
12	12	"Lie to do good"	29 May 2012	6 August 2013
The entrance test is in full swing. For the sake of her friendship with Francesca, Violetta refuses to reveal her true feelings for Tomas, so she won't hurt her best friend's feelings. Also, Violetta faces an opportunity to join the Studio, but she is not sure if she should do it or not.
13	13	"Thank you"	30 May 2012	7 August 2013
Violetta wants to join the Studio.
14	14	"Secret"	31 May 2012	8 August 2013
Refusing to hurt her father's feelings, Violetta changes her mind and decides to not audition for the Studio. Knowing that Violetta cannot waste this chance because she's a natural singer, everyone tries to convince her to change her mind.
15	15	"Her fate is now"	1 June 2012	9 August 2013
After finding out that her father hid her mother's things from her, Violetta becomes angry at him. When it seems that no one can't convince Violetta to audition for the Studio, there was one person who can convince Violetta to do it, and that was Tomas, with a little help from Violetta's mother, because she read her diary and realized that she is a singer and music is her passion.
16	16	"Jealous"	4 June 2012	12 August 2013
The entrance tests are almost reaching their end. After passing the singing test, Violetta still needs to pass the dancing test if she wants to join the Studio. But Ludmila is there to make sure that Violetta will miss the test and be unable to join the Studio. So she and Naty made a plan, they locked Violetta in the janitor's room and stole her phone and diary, so she won't make it to the test.
17	17	"Usually "dad""	5 June 2012	13 August 2013
Violetta and Tomas made it to the Studio. On the first day, a misunderstanding begins when Francesca thinks that Tomas wrote a song for her, but it was actually written for Violetta.
18	18	"Impossible Love"	6 June 2012	14 August 2013
While working on duet songs as a part of Angie's assignment, Violetta finds it hard to practice with Leon when she can't stop thinking about Tomas.
19	19	"Singing competition"	7 June 2012	15 August 2013
After finding out that he has truly fallen in love with Violetta, Leon asks her out for a "friendly" date. With several obstacles like Herman, Tomas and Ludmila, will Violetta and Leon's "friendly" date work?
20	20	"Make a friend suffer..."	8 June 2012	16 August 2013
Violetta has different feelings for both Tomas and Leon. She feels comfortable when she's with Leon, but her relationship with Tomas becomes more complicated because she can't reveal her feelings since Francesca also likes Tomas, and she doesn't want to hurt her best friend's feelings.
21	21	"A song for her"	11 June 2012	19 August 2013
When Violetta's feelings for Tomas seem to win a big fight, she decides to ask him if he really wrote a song for her, which he denies, but then he decides to tell Violetta the song was written for her.
22	22	"You was born to dream"	12 June 2012	20 August 2013
Tomas is confused of that Violetta wants him to stay away for her. But he doesn't know that if Francesca finds out that Violetta has feelings for him, it'll be worse.
23	23	"A fatal fruit juice"	13 June 2012	21 August 2013
Wanting to regain her reputation, Ludmila wants to be the best on Angie's assignment when she decides to prevent Violetta from singing and ruin Francesca's life by telling her to who Tomas has actually written the song for.
24	24	"Beautiful"	14 June 2012	22 August 2013
After the misunderstanding has been cleared, Violetta feels more than ready for a relationship with Tomas, but when it turns out that she never had her first kiss, will it work or not?
25	25	"The reaction of Tomas"	15 June 2012	23 August 2013
Violetta freaks out when Tomas tries to kiss her and runs away. After this, Violetta refuses to look at Tomas' face, so she doesn't show up at the Studio. But Leon comes to cheer Violetta up and supports her.
26	26	"Plot"	18 June 2012	26 August 2013
Violetta and Tomas are out for their first date together. But Ludmila is there to ruin it. An unexpected arrival of Angie's mother may complicate some things and situations.
27	27	"Meeting really surprised"	19 June 2012	27 August 2013
Thanks to Ludmila, Violetta has stood Tomas up on their first date. Violetta's feelings for Tomas have changed when Ludmila sends a message from his phone that says that he doesn't want to have anything to do with her.
28	28	"Grandmother?"	20 June 2012	28 August 2013
After she sang with him in Angie's class, Violetta thinks of Leon more than a friend and she feels a bit torn between him and Tomas. Soon, Violetta makes a big decision.
29	29	"Model"	21 June 2012	29 August 2013
With the auditions for the mid-term show approaching, Violetta refuses to audition because she doesn't want her father to find out about her lie. Ludmila is determined to make Tomas hate Violetta by convincing him that she's going out with Leon.
30	30	"Second chance"	22 June 2012	30 August 2013
After an encounter with Angelica, Angie's mother, Herman wants to move out with Violetta to Dubai, and doesn't tell his daughter about the move. After finding out that her father lied to her again, Violetta decides to audition for the show.
31	31	"Audition"	25 June 2012	14 October 2013
The auditions for the show are in full swing, but who will get the lead male and female roles? Meanwhile, after they reconciled with each other, Violetta and Tomas decide to repeat their failed first date.
32	32	"Goodbye, everybody"	26 June 2012	15 October 2013
On their date, Violetta receives bad news from Tomas: He's going back to Spain. Tomas tells Violetta that they have to forget about each other, which may be impossible for both of them.
33	33	"Accidents volunteer"	27 June 2012	16 October 2013
Not wanting to let Tomas go back to Spain, Violetta comes up with an idea to have her father hire Tomas' father. After Leon quit the show because of Ludmila acting like a diva, Tomas (whose return to Spain has been delayed) is back in.
34	34	"Kiss"	28 June 2012	17 October 2013
The Studio's students have a concert at Resto Band to earn money for the show. After this, Violetta sang a song with Rock Bones and then, she finally shared her first kiss with Leon.
35	35	"A work"	29 June 2012	18 October 2013
After Leon kissed Violetta, they are now a couple. Despite this, Violetta still can't let go of Tomas and is still determined to prevent him from going back to Spain.
36	36	"Passion"	2 July 2012	21 October 2013
Upset because she had her first kiss with Leon and that she stole Ludmila's idea to hire his father (actually, it was the other way around), Tomas gives Violetta the cold shoulder. When Antonio cancels the show due to not having enough money, Violetta comes up with a plan to make him change his mind.
37	37	"Jade discovers everything"	3 July 2012	22 October 2013
Tomas is still mad at Violetta because he thinks that her feelings for him were only a lie. But Violetta has the worst problems because her father and Jade's engagement party and the mid-term show are taking place on the same day!
38	38	"I am only a point"	4 July 2012	23 October 2013
After Jade discovered her secret, Violetta is forced to give up her dreams for the sake of her father's happiness.
39	39	"Tomas or Leon?"	5 July 2012	24 October 2013
Violetta's dreams are shattered because of that she can't hurt her father's feelings. But, when it's revealed that Violetta still has feelings for Tomas despite dating Leon, and that Tomas still has feelings for Violetta despite being friends with Ludmila, will something change?
40	40	"Show"	6 July 2012	25 October 2013
On the eve of the big show, Ludmila is forced to drop out because she has to fulfill her job to appear as a spokesperson for the pig food commercial. Everyone tries to convince Violetta to be in the show because she's the only one who can save it. What will Violetta do?
Violetta está cambiando (in English "Violetta's changing")
41	41	"Talk If You Can"	3 September 2012	4 November 2013
After the show has been ruined, Pablo quits from his job as the director and he's replaced by Gregorio, much to the students' dismay. Meanwhile, Violetta doesn't know what to do because she has feelings for both Tomas and Leon.
42	42	"The Pact"	4 September 2012	5 November 2013
With Gregorio as the new director, the students are facing difficulties when he gives them a very hard assignment. Violetta has a big problem because she wants to be only with Leon, but her feelings for Tomas are standing on the way. Also, there's a new student at the Studio, Broadway.
43	43	"Bad Partition"	5 September 2012	6 November 2013
Still dealing with having to choose between Tomas and Leon, Violetta has written a song that can help her.
44	44	"Hard luck!"	6 September 2012	7 November 2013
After Leon discovered Violetta's song, she decided she'll be with him, even though Tomas is close to her. Problems arise when Jade accidentally tells Herman that Violetta is going to the Studio, causing him to go there.
45	45	"Fright"	7 September 2012	11 November 2013
Violetta tries to convince her father that Angie isn't the bad person he thinks she is and tries to get her back. Tomas tries to talk with Violetta about the state of their relationship, but what will come out of it?
46	46	"The Anger of Francesca"	10 September 2012	12 November 2013
Violetta and Ramallo come up with a plan to bring Angie back together. Also, Violetta feels that her heart beats stronger again whenever she looks at Tomas, even though she's dating Leon.
47	47	"Kisses of Birthday"	11 September 2012	13 November 2013
Feeling terrible because they all forgot Francesca's birthday, Violetta and the others plan a surprise party. Tomas explains to Violetta that Ludmila is not his girlfriend.
48	48	"Pirate or Princess ?"	12 September 2012	14 November 2013
After seeing Ludmila kissing "Tomas" (actually, it was Andres dressed in Tomas' costume), Violetta decides to catch Tomas in his lie by pretending to be Ludmila and wearing her costume. What Violetta doesn't know is that she's putting her relationship with her boyfriend Leon in danger by doing that.
49	49	"Misunderstandings"	13 September 2012	18 November 2013
After watching the video of Violetta's almost-kiss with Tomas, Leon decided to break up with Violetta. Ludmila is determined to make Violetta's life even more miserable by tricking her and Tomas to meet at the same place and by making sure that Leon sees them.
50	50	"Duets"	14 September 2012	19 November 2013
Gregorio gives the members of his special group an assignment that they will do in duets. Unfortunately, he decides that Violetta and Ludmila will be singing together in a duet.
51	51	"The Duel"	17 September 2012	20 November 2013
Violetta challenges Ludmila to a duel which will conclude who will do the song they will be singing together.
52	52	"The Official reception of all the dangers"	18 September 2012	21 November 2013
After a big fight, Violetta and Tomas completely give up on each other. After Violetta accidentally sends Leon an e-mail on which she wants him back, they soon get back together.
53	53	"Upside down"	19 September 2012	25 November 2013
In order to expel Tomas from the Studio, Gregorio has Andres tell Tomas some bad things about Violetta that aren't true. Despite the grudge between them, Tomas protects Violetta and angrily pushes Andres to the trash can, and then Gregorio expels him. When Violetta finds out that Tomas and Ludmila are dating, she angrily confronts him.
54	54	"Locked"	20 September 2012	26 November 2013
After finding out that Tomas was expelled from the Studio because he protected her, Violetta tries to make up with him. The Studio's students get fed up with Gregorio and even some of them turn against each other.
55	55	"TV reality"	21 September 2012	27 November 2013
Violetta and Tomas decide to stay only as friends. The students rebel against Gregorio and have a concert outside the Studio.
56	56	"Maxata"	24 September 2012	28 November 2013
There's a new exchange student from Italy, and his name is Federico. Violetta doesn't like Federico at first, even when she finds out that he's staying with her. Gregorio decides to have an internet reality show on the internet portal YouMix on which a talent show will be broadcast and the students will audition for it.
57	57	"Federico"	25 September 2012	2 December 2013
Federico threatens to tell Herman about Violetta's secret. At Leon's suggestion, Federico sings with Violetta and, admiring her talent, becomes friends with her and promises to not tell her father anything of her secret. The Studio's students sign up for the talent show. Violetta refuses to sign up because she doesn't want her father to find out.
58	58	"Intended to shine"	26 September 2012	3 December 2013
After she signed up for the show, Violetta quickly begins to doubt whether it's the right thing to do. Meanwhile, Federico seems to be very interested in Violetta, and even tries to kiss her, but fails.
59	59	"Inscription"	27 September 2012	4 December 2013
Federico's failed attempt to kiss Violetta puts him in a confrontation with Leon. Federico quickly comes clean saying that he shouldn't have tried to kiss Violetta. The auditions for the show begin.
60	60	"Talent 21"	28 September 2012	5 December 2013
Herman's unexpected return is making things difficult for Violetta as she was still auditioning and didn't make it to the show yet. After Federico tells Tomas that Ludmila tore up Violetta's application for the show, Tomas talks to Ludmila about what she did, but she denies it, as always. But Tomas doesn't fall for her lies this time.
61	61	"Observed by everywhere 1st part"	1 October 2012	28 July 2014
Violetta is about to tell Herman the truth when a fan recognizes her. She denies being on a reality show and then is forced to continue lying. Tomas accuses Ludmila of destroying Violetta's entry form, which leads to them having a fight. Later on, Violetta finds comfort in Tomas' arms, but they don't realize that Marotti has recorded it all.
62	62	"Observed by everywhere 2nd part"	2 October 2012	29 July 2014
In an attempt to increase the reality show's viewers, Marotti focuses more on the contestants' personal lives rather than their talent and edits the filmed interviews. This causes the Studio's students to fight with each other, nearly exposes Angie's secret and, worst of all, ruins Violetta's relationship with Leon.
63	63	"Popularity"	3 October 2012	30 July 2014
The second round of the reality show begins, but only four contestants will reach the semi-finals, so Violetta, Tomas, Leon, Ludmila, Francesca, Maxi, Naty and Federico do their best to make it.
64	64	"A vote to change everything"	4 October 2012	31 July 2014
Ludmila ruins Violetta's reputation by posting on YouMix's website a film in which Violetta was mocking her, but edits it to make it look like that Violetta is really a spoiled, selfish and arrogant "supernova". This results in Violetta's fans to turn on her which may cost her chances to reach the semi-finals.
65	65	"The wheel turns"	5 October 2012	4 August 2014
Violetta's friends post the full video on the YouMix's website to prove to everyone that Ludmila set Violetta up. Leon quits the reality show, so Violetta can return. But Violetta refuses to get back to the show.
66	66	"Taken in his own trap"	8 October 2012	5 August 2014
Violetta returns to the reality show. At the show's semi-finals, Violetta, Tomas, Ludmila and Federico will sing and play an instrument at the same time, and the contestants who were eliminated will vote for the finalist. Meanwhile, Violetta is still searching for her aunt named Angeles, but she doesn't know that she already found her aunt.
67	67	"No flea for Castillo"	9 October 2012	6 August 2014
To prevent Violetta or Federico from reaching the finals, Ludmila leaves a lot of fleas at Violetta's house, causing a late-night flea circus. With Violetta half-asleep on the day of the semi-finals, will she be able to do her best and reach the finals?
68	68	"Manipulation"	10 October 2012	7 August 2014
Violetta gets upset with Leon after he said a lot of bad things about her to Ludmila, who purposely asked him to tell what he thought of Violetta before he met her. Francesca's new romantic relationship with Tomas puts a strain in her friendship with Violetta.
69	69	"Dilemma"	11 October 2012	11 August 2014
After Angie kissed him (to prevent him from seeing Violetta at the Studio), Herman starts to seriously think about his future with her. Jade announces that tomorrow the whole family is going to the charity ball, but unfortunately, tomorrow are also the finals of the reality show. What's Violetta gonna do?
70	70	"Violetta is the winner ?"	12 October 2012	12 August 2014
Violetta wants to get back together with Leon, but she's worried that he doesn't want to, and vice versa. "Talents 21" is coming to an end. The winner can be chosen by the public vote on the YouMix's website.
71	71	"The truth comes out on Angie"	15 October 2012	13 August 2014
Thanks to Ludmila, Violetta finds out that Angie is her aunt. At first, Violetta is angry with Angie, but then forgives her. When Angie decides to tell Herman the truth, Violetta considers it a bad idea because he'll separate them again.
72	72	"Memories"	16 October 2012	14 August 2014
After finding out that Angie is her aunt, Violetta finally meets her grandmother, Angelica. Angelica decides to tell Herman the truth, but Violetta and Angie try to stop her from doing this.
73	73	"We can..."	17 October 2012	18 August 2014
One night, Violetta and Leon both dream about a beautiful and romantic song and the next day, they try to remember that song because they're worried if they forget it, they'll lose something important.
74	74	"Courage and Bitterness"	18 October 2012	19 August 2014
Tomas hugs Violetta to cheer her up when she gets upset after Leon refused to get back together with her. But when Leon sees them and Francesca hears the news, a huge jealousy begins.
75	75	"No respites for Jade"	19 October 2012	20 August 2014
After finding out who Angie really is, Jade tells Herman in front of everyone, and he forces his sister-in-law to move out, upsetting both Angie and Violetta. Tomas and Francesca's romantic relationship comes to an end when Francesca discovers that Tomas still has feelings for Violetta.
76	76	"A difficult choice has to make"	22 October 2012	21 August 2014
Convinced that Jade is the only person who never lied to him, Herman decides to marry her in three days. Violetta tries to persuade her father to not marry Jade for his own sake, but to no avail. Violetta begins to realize that she again has feelings for both Tomas and Leon.
77	77	"Ultimatum"	23 October 2012	25 August 2014
Violetta cannot make up her mind between Leon and Tomas and asks her grandmother's advice. There's a confrontation between Violetta, Herman and Jade. Herman sees a poster for the show.
78	78	"Goodbye the music..."	24 October 2012	26 August 2014
After discovering Violetta's secret, Herman forbids her from singing and studying or doing anything related to music. With Herman and Jade's wedding approaching, Violetta is determined to put a stop to it because she knows that her father loves only one person and that's Angie.
79	79	"Violetta and Tomas's kiss"	25 October 2012	27 August 2014
Herman breaks up with Jade in the middle of her wedding, much to her dismay. But the problems aren't over yet when Herman decides to move out with Violetta to Qatar. After saying goodbye to her friends, Violetta shares a kiss with Tomas.
80	80	"In my own world"	26 October 2012	28 August 2014
After Violetta and Tomas finally shared their first kiss, Violetta decides to stay alone. Herman wants to leave urgently for Qatar, but will they ever leave Buenos Aires? Final Appearances Of: Braco, Napo, Rafa, Angélica, Tomas and Luca.
