= Eviel Pérez Magaña =

Mexican politician (born 1963)

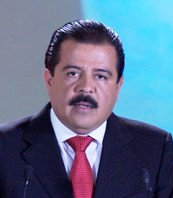
- Pérez Magaña in 2012
- Born: 6 April 1963 (age 63); Tuxtepec, Oaxaca, Mexico
- Education: TecMilenio University (Lic.)
- Occupations: politician and businessman
- Political party: PRI

Eviel Pérez Magaña (born 6 April 1963) is a Mexican politician affiliated with the Institutional Revolutionary Party (PRI). After being the last Minister of Social Development from 2018 to 2019 during the administration of Enrique Peña Nieto, he dedicated to his private business and enterprises. Before being the head of the ministry he was its undersecretary of social development programs. Previously he was a Senator for Oaxaca during the 62nd Congress (2012–2015); in the Senate he was the president of the indigenous affairs commission. He was also elected to the Chamber of Deputies in 2003 and 2009, representing the first district of Oaxaca, and he served as the municipal president of Tuxtepec (2002–2003).
