= Schantz =

Schantz is a surname. Notable people with the surname include:

- Von Schantz family
  - Johan Eberhard von Schantz (1802–1880), Finnish admiral in the Imperial Russian Navy
    - Schantz Islands, a coral reef on the Marshall Islands, also known as Wotho
- Barbara Schantz, American police officer and Playboy model
- Philip von Schantz (1928–1998), Swedish artist
- Peter Schantz (born 1954), Swedish researcher
- Richard Schantz (born 1950), German philosopher

== See also ==
- The Schantz Organ Co(mpany).
- Schanz (spelling variation)
