= Schanz =

Schanz is a German surname. Notable people with the surname include:

- Martin Schanz (1842–1914), German classicist
- Georg von Schanz (1853–1931), German legal scholar
- Charley Schanz (1919–1992), American baseball player
- Waldemar Schanz (born 1968), German sport shooter
- (Linda) Heidi Schanze (born 1973), American actress

== See also ==
- Aachen Schanz station, a railway station in Aachen
- Schanz Glacier, a glacier in the Heritage Range
- Schantz
