= Viola Township, Olmsted County, Minnesota =

Viola Township, Minnesota
- Township
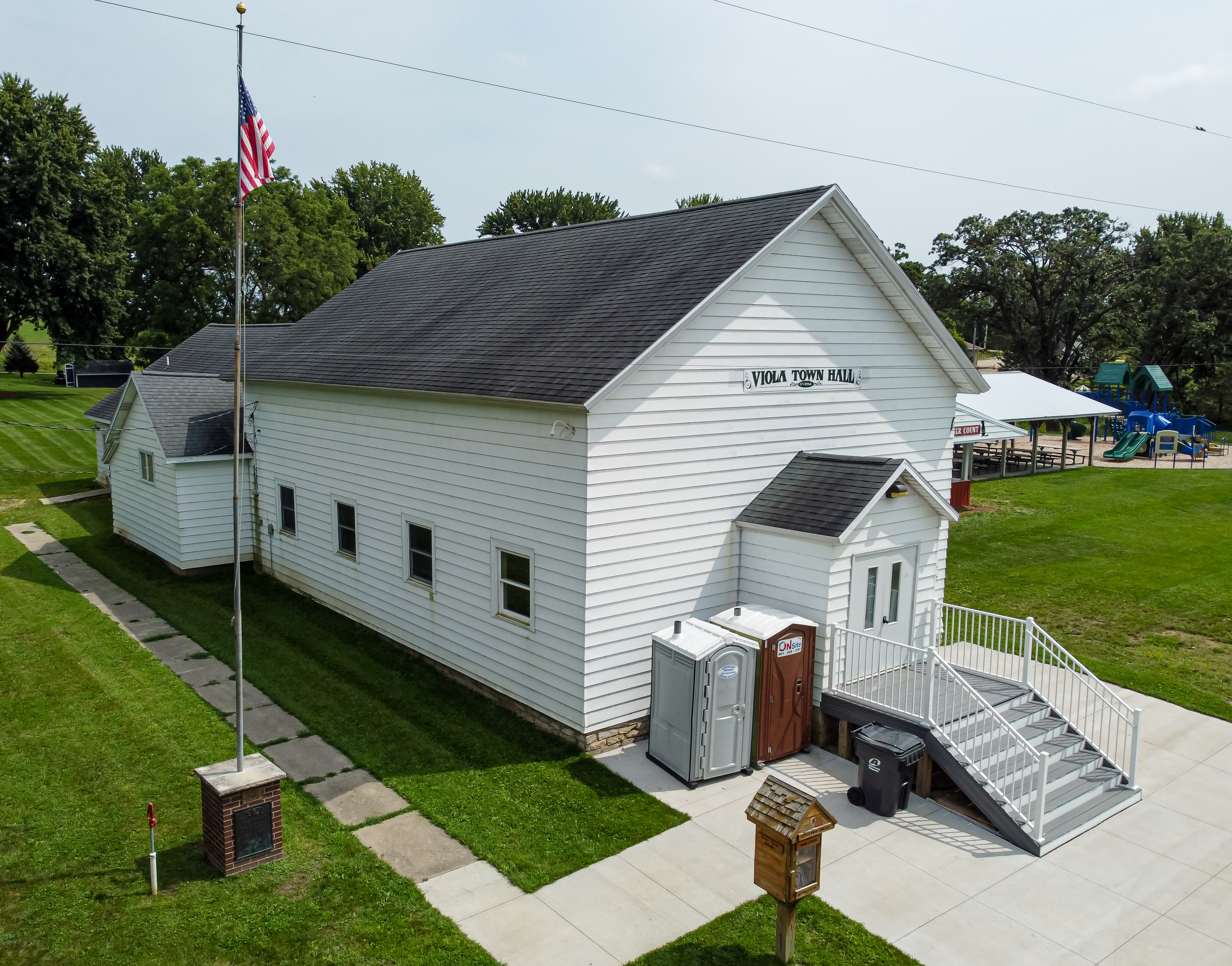
- Town hall

- Location within the state of Minnesota Viola Township, Minnesota (the United States)
- Coordinates: 44°4′3″N 92°15′34″W
- Country: United States
- State: Minnesota
- County: Olmsted

Area
  - Total: 35.8 sq mi (92.6 km^{2})
  - Land: 35.8 sq mi (92.6 km^{2})
  - Water: 0 sq mi (0.0 km^{2})
- Elevation: 1,161 ft (354 m)

Population (2000)
  - Total: 555
  - Density: 16/sq mi (6/km^{2})
- Time zone: UTC-6 (Central (CST))
  - Summer (DST): UTC-5 (CDT)
- ZIP code: 55934
- Area code: 507
- FIPS code: 27-67270
- GNIS feature ID: 0665878

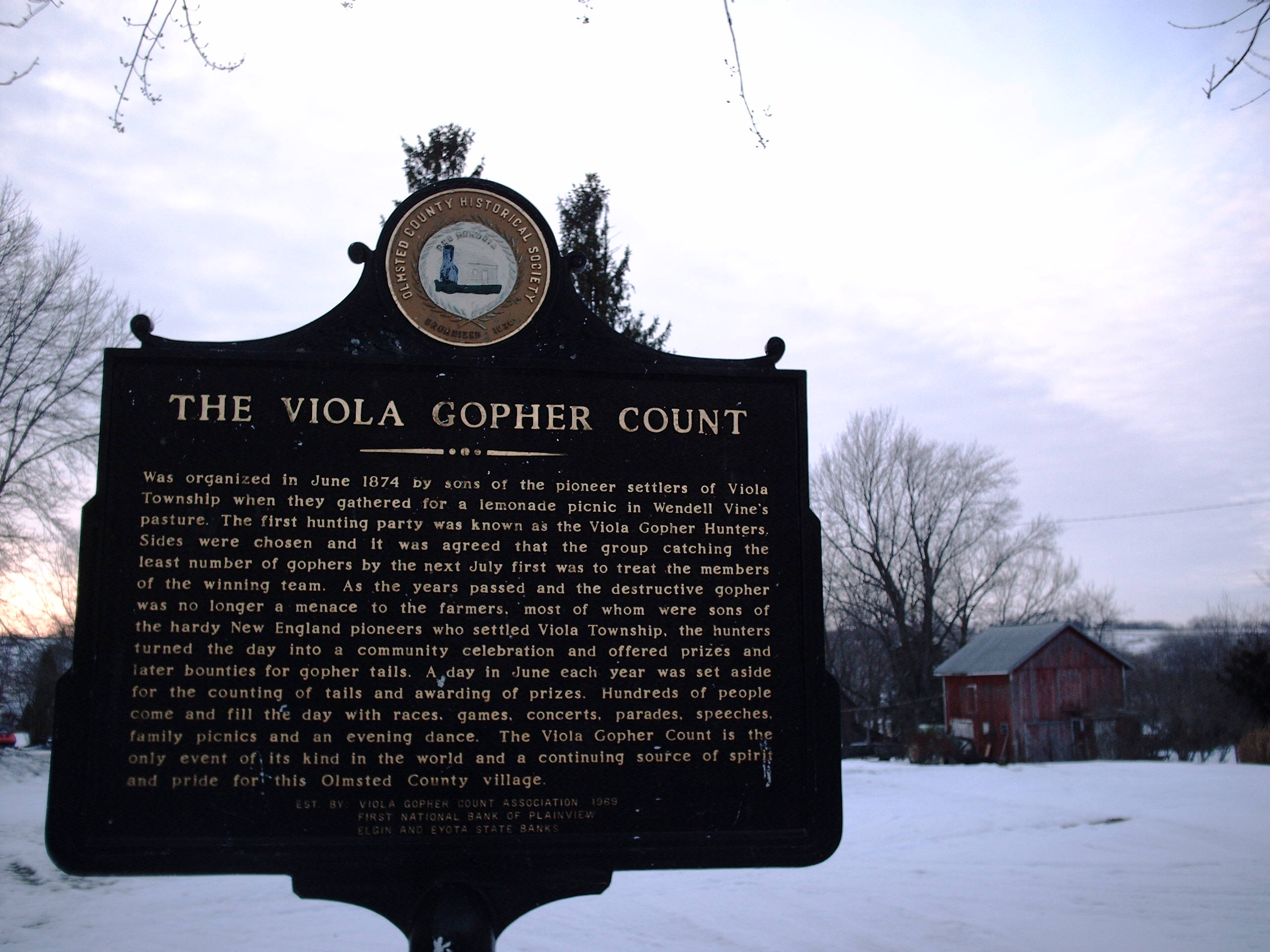
Historic marker describing the Gopher Count in Viola, Minnesota.

Viola Township is a township in Olmsted County, Minnesota, United States. The population was 555 at the 2000 census.

The township includes the unincorporated community of Viola.

== History ==
Viola Township was organized in 1858, and named after Viola, Wisconsin.

== Geography ==
According to the United States Census Bureau, the township has a total area of 35.8 square miles (92.6 km^{2}), all land.

== Demographics ==
As of the census of 2000, there were 555 people, 199 households, and 160 families residing in the township. The population density was 15.5 people per square mile (6.0/km^{2}). There were 208 housing units at an average density of 5.8/sq mi (2.2/km^{2}). The racial makeup of the township was 99.10% White, 0.18% African American, 0.36% Asian, and 0.36% from two or more races. Hispanic or Latino of any race were 0.18% of the population.

There were 199 households, out of which 40.7% had children under the age of 18 living with them, 73.9% were married couples living together, 4.0% had a female householder with no husband present, and 19.1% were non-families. 16.6% of all households were made up of individuals, and 7.0% had someone living alone who was 65 years of age or older. The average household size was 2.79 and the average family size was 3.17.

In the township the population was spread out, with 28.8% under the age of 18, 7.2% from 18 to 24, 31.7% from 25 to 44, 23.1% from 45 to 64, and 9.2% who were 65 years of age or older. The median age was 37 years. For every 100 females, there were 101.1 males. For every 100 females age 18 and over, there were 105.7 males.

Of the 1,522 employed civilians reported in the 2000 census, 33.6% were in management-related occupations and 23.2% were in office and sales-related occupations.

The median income for a household in the township was $54,250, and the median income for a family was $57,500. Males had a median income of $34,250 versus $27,422 for females. The per capita income for the township was $21,587. About 3.5% of families and 2.9% of the population were below the poverty line, including none of those under age 18 and 21.8% of those age 65 or over.
