= Viola Shelly Schantz =

American zoologist (1895–1977)

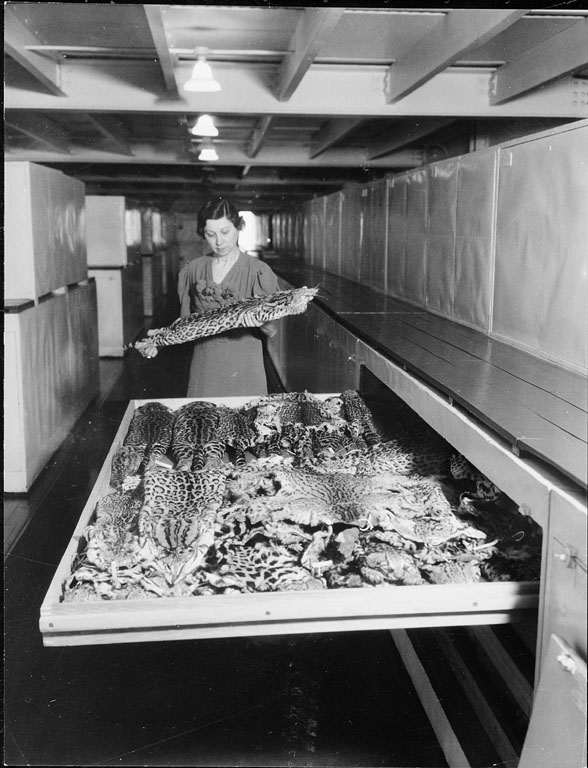
- Schantz surveys animal pelts from a storage drawer.
- Born: June 22, 1895; Salisbury Township, Lehigh County, Pennsylvania, U.S.
- Died: May 1977; District of Columbia, U.S.
- Occupations: Biologist; Zoologist; Mammalogist

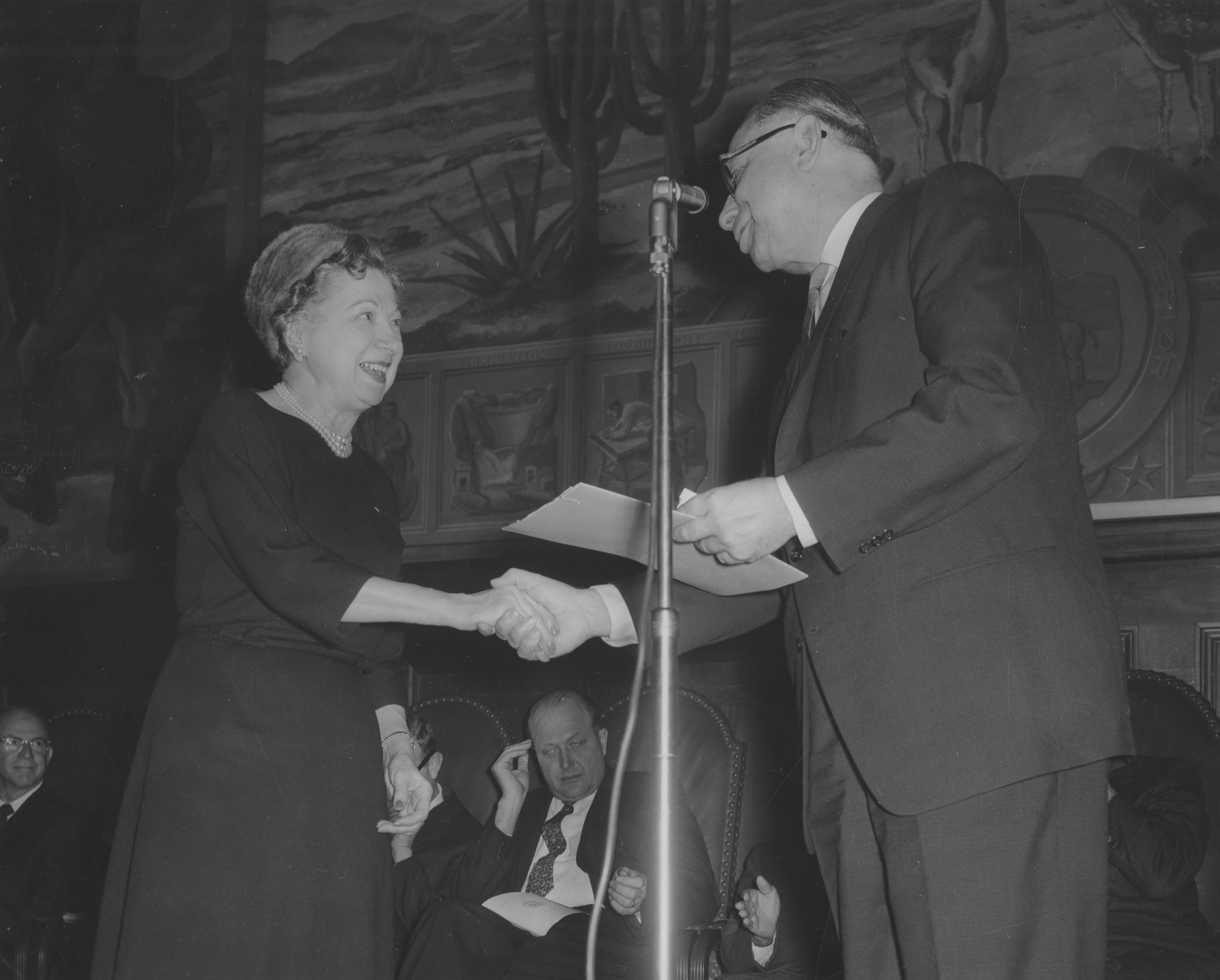
Assistant Secretary of the Interior Frank P. Briggs presents a citation for distinctive service to Viola Schantz.

Viola Shelly Schantz (1895–1977) was an American biologist and zoologist. She worked for the United States Fish and Wildlife Service from 1918 to 1961, as a biological aide, biologist and systematic zoologist. Stationed at the Smithsonian Institution throughout her career, she was the curator for the North American mammal collection in the National Museum of Natural History.

== Biography ==
Schantz was born in 1895 in Salisbury Township, Lehigh County, Pennsylvania, United States, to parents John and Laura Schantz.

She died in May 1977 at the age of 82 in the District of Columbia.

== Professional accomplishments ==
Schantz was one of the founding members of the American Society of Mammalogists (ASM), and was present at their inaugural meeting at the United States National Museum (now the National Museum of Natural History), in Washington, D.C. on April 3–4, 1919. Schantz served as treasurer for the organization for twenty-two consecutive years, from 1930 to 1952, and was the first woman to chair the Local Committee for the annual meeting of the ASM in 1959.

In 1945, Schantz named a previously unrecognized subspecies of American Badger. Jackson's Badger, (Taxidea taxus jacksoni) was named after American zoologist Dr. Hartley Harrad Thompson Jackson.

== Publications ==
She co-authored, with James Arthur Poole, a comprehensive catalog of the mammal specimens in the collections of the United States National Museum, which was published in 1942.

== Awards and honors ==
Schantz received the Honor Award for Distinguished Service from the United States Department of the Interior in January 1962.
