= 8 Women =

2002 film by François Ozon

- French theatrical release poster
- French: 8 femmes
- Directed by: François Ozon
- Screenplay by: François Ozon; Marina de Van
- Based on: Huit femmes by Robert Thomas
- Produced by: Olivier Delbosc; Marc Missonnier
- Starring: Catherine Deneuve; Isabelle Huppert; Emmanuelle Béart; Fanny Ardant; Virginie Ledoyen; Danielle Darrieux; Ludivine Sagnier; Firmine Richard
- Cinematography: Jeanne Lapoirie
- Edited by: Laurence Bawedin
- Music by: Krishna Levy
- Production companies: Fidélité Productions; France 2 Cinéma; Mars Films
- Distributed by: Mars Distribution (France); BIM Distribuzione (Italy)
- Release dates: 8 January 2002 (Paris premiere); 6 February 2002 (France); 17 October 2002 (Italy)
- Running time: 111 minutes
- Countries: France; Italy
- Language: French
- Budget: €8.5 million ($7.5 million)
- Box office: $42.4 million

8 Women (French: 8 femmes) is a 2002 jukebox musical comedy mystery film written and directed by François Ozon. Based on the 1958 play by Robert Thomas, it features an ensemble cast of high-profile French actresses: Catherine Deneuve, Isabelle Huppert, Emmanuelle Béart, Fanny Ardant, Virginie Ledoyen, Danielle Darrieux, Ludivine Sagnier and Firmine Richard. Revolving around an eccentric family of women and their employees in the 1950s, the film follows eight women as they gather to celebrate Christmas in an isolated, snowbound cottage only to find Marcel, the family patriarch, dead with a knife in his back. Trapped in the house, every woman becomes a suspect, each having her own motive and secret.

Ozon initially envisioned a remake of George Cukor's film The Women (1939), but eventually settled on Thomas's Huit femmes after legal obstacles prevented him from doing so. Drawing inspiration from Cukor's screwball comedies of the late 1930s and the 1950s work of directors such as Douglas Sirk, Vincente Minnelli, and Alfred Hitchcock, 8 Women blends farce, melodrama, musical, crime, mystery and comedy film genres while addressing murder, greed, adultery, and homosexuality. Set primarily in the entry hall of a manor house, the film recreates much of the play's original theatrical feel. It also serves as a pastiche of and homage to the history of film, Hollywood musicals and the actresses' filmographies.

The film's premiere was held on 8 January 2002 in Paris, where filming had taken place. 8 Women competed for the Golden Bear at the 52nd Berlin International Film Festival, where its all-female cast was awarded a Silver Bear for Outstanding Artistic Contribution. Released to largely positive reviews, with major praise for the stars' performance, chemistry and dynamic, its humor and its production values, the film was nominated for twelve César Awards, including Best Film. At the 2002 European Film Awards, the film was nominated for six awards, including Best Film and Best Director; it won for Best Actress for the eight principal actresses. It was also selected as the French entry for the Best Foreign Language Film category at the 75th Academy Awards, but was not nominated.

== Plot ==
Suzon returns from school for Christmas break, finding her mother Gaby, her younger sister Catherine, and her wheelchair-using grandmother Mamy in the living room. Their conversation drifts to the subject of the family patriarch, Marcel, and Catherine leads the first song, "Papa t'es plus dans le coup". Suzon and Catherine's aunt Augustine awakens and argues with the rest of the family and the two servants (Madame Chanel and Louise), eventually returning upstairs and threatening suicide. Mamy jumps out of her wheelchair, haphazardly explaining her ability to walk as a "Christmas miracle". Augustine is eventually calmed down, and she sings her song of longing, "Message personnel".

The maid finds Marcel's stabbed body upstairs and screams. Preceded by Catherine, the others soon arrive at Marcel's room to see him stabbed in the back, and Catherine warns them against disturbing the room until the police arrive. Realizing that the dogs were quiet the night before, they realize that the murderer was known to the dogs and therefore must be one of the women in the house. Attempting to call the authorities, they find that the telephone line has been cut, but before they can go to the police station together, they are informed that an intruder is roaming the garden. It is revealed as Marcel's sister Pierrette, a nightclub singer and supposed prostitute, who has previously been barred from the house due to Gaby's intense dislike for her. When questioned, she claims a mysterious telephone call informed her of Marcel's death and celebrates her sexual liberty with "A quoi sert de vivre libre".

It is realized that she has been to the house before, as she knew immediately which room belonged to her brother, making her the eighth potential killer. The women try to start the car, and find that it has been sabotaged, stalling them. Attempting to identify the murderer amongst them, they learn that Suzon returned the night before to secretly tell her father of her pregnancy. She sings a song to Catherine, "Mon amour, mon ami", about her lover; however, she was sexually abused by her father. It is later revealed that Suzon is the offspring of Gaby's first great love, who was killed not long after Suzon was conceived; whenever Gaby looks at Suzon, she is reminded of him.

Suspicion then swings to Madame Chanel, the housekeeper, due to her actions the night before. It is revealed that she had been having an affair with Pierrette, who went to see her brother that night to ask for money to pay off her debts. When some members of the family are upset that she is a lesbian, Madame Chanel retreats to the kitchen.

Meanwhile, it is revealed that Mamy also possesses some valuable stock shares that could have resolved Marcel's debts. Out of greed, she lied that her shares had been stolen by someone who knew their whereabouts. Gaby also shockingly tells Augustine that Mamy killed their father, and the two sisters consequently lock Mamy in a cupboard. Louise, the new maid, is exposed as Marcel's mistress, and declares affection for Gaby, but also criticizes her weakness and indecision. When questioned by Augustine (who is revealed as a virgin) on how to seduce a man, she entrancingly replies with "Pile ou face" and removes her maid's cap and apron, asserting herself as an equal. Gaby sings "Toi Jamais", lamenting that other men gave her the affection Marcel never delivered. It is revealed that she had an affair with Marcel's business partner, Jacques Farneaux, who has been having an affair with Pierrette. The two women passionately make out on the living room floor, stunning the others who are witnessing.

Eventually, Madame Chanel solves the mystery, but a gunshot shocks and silences her. Catherine reveals that she hid in Marcel's closet from where she witnessed all the other women talk to him the night before and subsequently helped him fake his own death to show him the truth about his household. Proclaiming him now free of the other women's clutches, she rushes to his bedroom only to witness Marcel shoot himself in the head. Mamy closes with "Il n'y a pas d'amour heureux" as the women clasp hands and face the screen.

== Cast ==
- Danielle Darrieux as Mamy, the matriarch
- Catherine Deneuve as Gaby, her daughter, the victim's wife
- Isabelle Huppert as Augustine, her other daughter who is tachycardiac
- Emmanuelle Béart as Louise, the new chambermaid
- Fanny Ardant as Pierrette, the victim's sister
- Virginie Ledoyen as Suzon, the victim's elder daughter
- Ludivine Sagnier as Catherine, the victim's younger daughter
- Firmine Richard as Madame Chanel, the cook
- Dominique Lamure as Marcel, the victim, Gaby's husband
- Romy Schneider (via photograph) as the chambermaid's previous mistress

== Musical numbers ==
1. "Papa t'es plus dans le coup" (transl. "Dad, You're Out of Touch") – Catherine and Company
2. "Message personnel" (transl. "Personal Message") – Augustine
3. "A quoi sert de vivre libre" (transl. "What's the Point of Living Free?") – Pierrette
4. "Mon amour, mon ami" (transl. "My Lover, My Friend") – Suzon
5. "Pour ne pas vivre seul" ("So as Not to Live Alone") – Madame Chanel
6. "Pile ou face" (lit. transl. "Heads or Tails") – Louise
7. "Toi Jamais" (transl. "Never You") – Gaby
8. "Il n'y a pas d'amour heureux" (transl. "There is no Happy Love") – Mamy

== Production ==
Ozon was inspired by the 1950s Ross Hunter productions of Douglas Sirk and Alfred Hitchcock. To achieve the look of the latter two director's films, Ozon had costume designer Pascaline Chavanne fashion an original costume for each character. Chavanne was inspired by Dior's New Look and the earlier film costumes of Edith Head. Composer Krishna Levy also provided an instrumental score evocative of Bernard Herrmann, with touches of Miklós Rózsa and Elmer Bernstein, as well as a soundtrack featuring eight songs performed unexpectedly by the film's title characters. Principal Photography took place from 9 April to 9 June 2001 at the Aubervilliers studios.

== Reception ==
=== Critical response ===
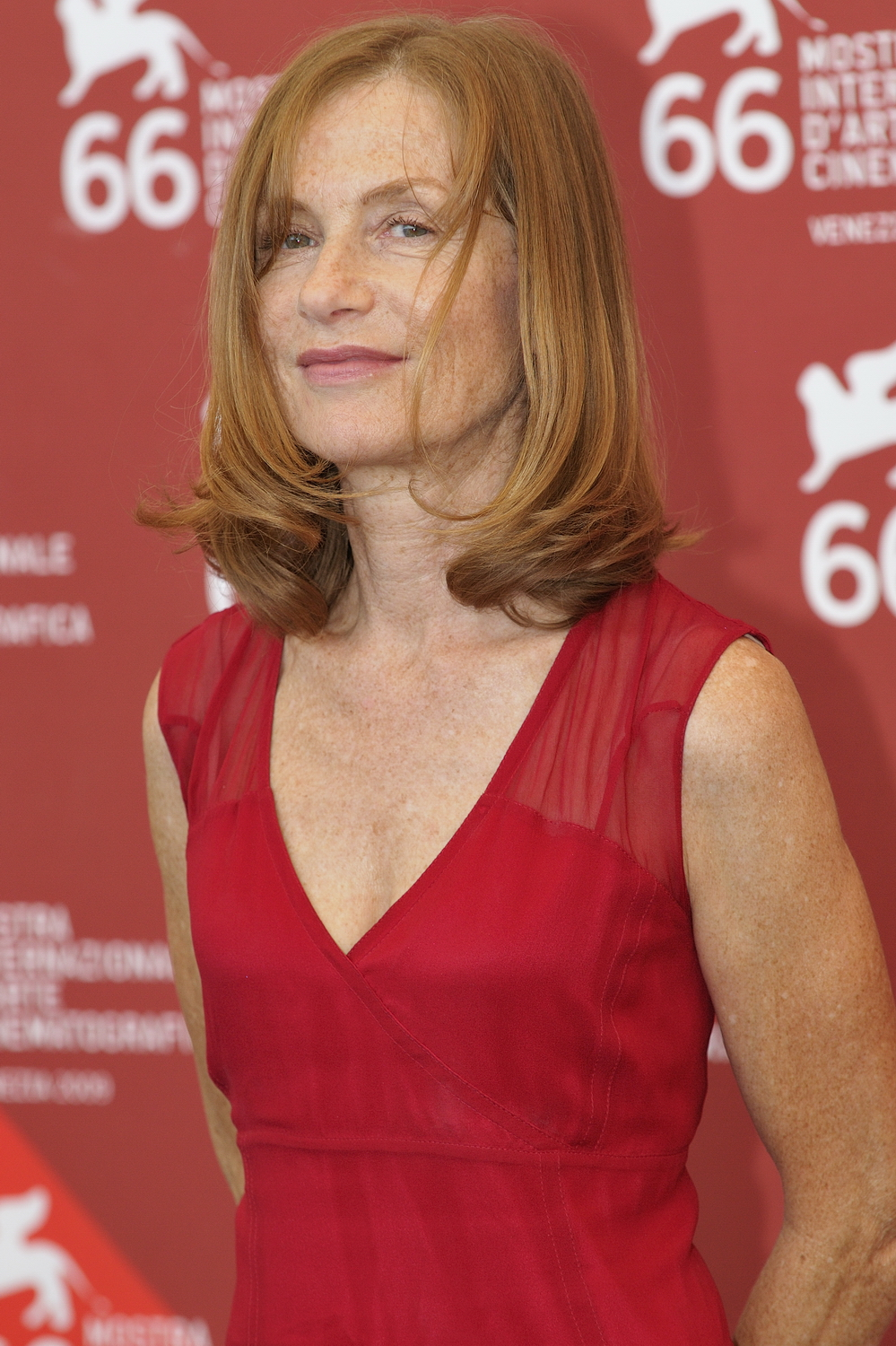
Isabelle Huppert won several awards for her role in the film.

8 Women received generally positive reviews from critics. The review aggregator website Rotten Tomatoes reported that 79% of critics gave the film a positive rating, based on 124 reviews, with an average score of 7/10. Its consensus states "Featuring some of the best French actresses working today, 8 Women is frothy, delirious, over-the-top fun." On Metacritic, the film holds a 64/100 rating, based on 30 reviews, indicating "generally favorable" reviews.

Jonathan Curiel of the San Francisco Chronicle remarked that 8 Women was "a movie that is so original, so funny, so alive with drama, intrigue, mystery and colors that you want to see it again and again", citing it the "new masterpiece" in Ozon's filmography. Roger Ebert, writing for the Chicago Sun-Times, gave 8 Women three out of four stars. He noted that the film "is in no sense serious about murder, its plot, or anything else. It's an elaborate excuse to have fun with its cast," adding: "Watching 8 Women, you have a silly grin half of the time." He concluded that "Movies like 8 Women are essentially made for movie-lovers. You have to have seen overdecorated studio musicals, and you have to know who Darrieux and Deneuve and Beart and Huppert and Ardant are, to get the full flavor." Lisa Schwarzbaum from Entertainment Weekly felt that "what does matter is that a phalanx of France's most famous actresses play a gay peekaboo with their own images in the guise of replicating a '50s technicoloured production. The result is weightless entertainment that's both camp and true, a warped adoration of star-quality actresses as amazing creatures who can project the lives of fictional characters as well as the essence of their own fabulous selves. Hollywood, start your remake."

The Washington Post writer Ann Hornaday called the film "a gorgeous, if disjointed, spectacle, made endurable—if not entirely comprehensible—by its eye-popping cast." She found that the picture "retains a stagy quality of heightened theatricality" and that "with its bold, luxurious palette and hard-candy surfaces, the film seems less photographed than forged out of silk and nail lacquer." Rolling Stone's Peter Travers concurred: "All eight women are something to see and marvel at. Whatever you call this one-of-a-kind bonbon spiked with wit and malice, it's classic oo-la-la." He rated the comedy three out of four stars. A. O. Scott from The New York Times said, "The high-minded critical term of art for such a decadent delight is 'guilty pleasure,' but a movie like this reveals that stuffy phrase to be both a redundancy and an oxymoron. 8 Women is indefensible, cynical, even grotesque; it is also pure—that is to say innocent and uncorrupted—fun." Less enthusiastic with the film, Salon.com wrote that "despite the all-star cast of beautiful, talented actresses, this French whodunit never lives up to the grand musicals it rips off".

Specific performances were cited for acclaim. Huppert's portrayal of Augustine was met with praise. Curiel wrote that "Huppert's song and dance—and her whole performance in the movie—is a study in determination. Huppert has a reputation for her intense portrayals, and in 8 Women, she steals every scene she's in as the uptight, melodramatic, bespectacled aunt." Ardant also received praise for her performance with Hornaday saying that "the showstopper is Ardant, who in a sensational turn combining the earthiness of Ava Gardner and the fire of Rita Hayworth, explodes with an elemental force all her own. Ardant alone is worth the price of admission to 8 Women."

=== Box office ===
The film was released on 6 February 2002 in France and opened at #3 in 493 cinemas, grossing $5,246,358 in the opening weekend. It grossed $18,991,866 in the domestic market. The film's international gross was in total $42,426,583.

=== Accolades ===
List of awards and nominations
Award	Category	Recipients and nominees	Result
Berlin International Film Festival	Berliner Morgenpost Reader Jury	François Ozon	Won
Berlin International Film Festival	Golden Bear	François Ozon	Nominated
Berlin International Film Festival	Silver Bear for Outstanding Artistic Contribution	Cast	Won
César Awards	Best Actress	Fanny Ardant	Nominated
César Awards	Best Actress	Isabelle Huppert	Nominated
César Awards	Best Cinematography	Jeanne Lapoirie	Nominated
César Awards	Best Costume Design	Pascaline Chavanne	Nominated
César Awards	Best Director	François Ozon	Nominated
César Awards	Best Film	—N/a	Nominated
César Awards	Best Music Written for a Film	Krishna Levy	Nominated
César Awards	Best Production Design	Arnaud de Moleron	Nominated
César Awards	Best Sound	Pierre Gamet; Benoît Hillebrant; Jean-Pierre Laforce	Nominated
César Awards	Best Supporting Actress	Danielle Darrieux	Nominated
César Awards	Best Original Screenplay or Adaptation	François Ozon; Marina de Van	Nominated
César Awards	Most Promising Actress	Ludivine Sagnier	Nominated
Chicago Film Critics Association Awards	Best Foreign Language Film	—N/a	Nominated
Étoiles d'Or	Best Actress	Isabelle Huppert	Won
Étoiles d'Or	Best Composer	Krishna Levy	Won
European Film Awards	Best Actress	Cast	Won
European Film Awards	Best Actress (Jameson People's Choice Award)	Fanny Ardant	Nominated
European Film Awards	Best Actress (Jameson People's Choice Award)	Isabelle Huppert	Nominated
European Film Awards	Best Director (Jameson People's Choice Award)	François Ozon	Nominated
European Film Awards	Best Film	Olivier Delbosc; Marc Missonnier	Nominated
European Film Awards	Best Screenwriter	François Ozon	Nominated
GLAAD Media Awards	Outstanding Film – Limited Release	—N/a	Nominated
Golden Reel Awards	Best Sound Editing in a Feature – Music – Musical	Benoît Hillebrant	Nominated
Lumière Awards	Best Director	François Ozon	Won
National Board of Review Awards	Best Foreign Language Film	—N/a	Won
Online Film Critics Society Awards	Best Costume Design	Pascaline Chavanne	Nominated
Online Film Critics Society Awards	Best Ensemble	Cast	Nominated
Russian Guild of Film Critics Awards	Best Foreign Actress	Isabelle Huppert	Won
San Diego Film Critics Society Awards	Special Award	Isabelle Huppert	Won

== See also ==
- 7 Women and a Murder - a 2021 Italian remake
- Isabelle Huppert on screen and stage
- List of Christmas films
- List of submissions to the 75th Academy Awards for Best Foreign Language Film
- List of French submissions for the Academy Award for Best Foreign Language Film
