= Papa t'es plus dans l'coup =

Single by Sheila
- Language: French
- Released: 1962 or 1963
- Genre: yé-yé
- Songwriter: Jill & Jan
- Producers: Jacques Plait; Claude Carrère

Audio
- "Papa t'es plus dans l'coup" on YouTube

"Papa t'es plus dans l'coup" ([papa te plu dɑ̃ lku]; English translation: "Daddy, you are not 'with it' anymore") is a song by French singer Sheila. Released on the same EP with "L'école est finie", the song also became a huge hit. Sheila performed it many times on television. Also, a Scopitone (an early form of music video) was made for it.

== Lyrics ==
The song reflects on parents' misunderstanding of their children, on the generational conflict.

== Writing ==
The song was written by Jill & Jan and produced by Jacques Plait and Claude Carrère.

== Covers ==
Ludivine Sagnier sang this song in François Ozon's 2002 movie 8 Women.

== See also ==
- Generation gap
- 1960s in France
