= Jonathan Curiel =

American journalist, in San Francisco

Jonathan Curiel (born July 10, 1960) is an American journalist, in San Francisco.

== Biography ==
Curiel was educated at University of California at Berkeley and the University of Oxford.

In 1993-1994, he lived in Lahore, Pakistan, where he taught at the University of the Punjab as a Fulbright Scholar. He was a staff writer for the San Francisco Chronicle. San Francisco Chronicle, Columbia Journalism Review, and Tablet Magazine,

Curiel's book Al' America won the 2008 American Book Award. The Washington Post reviewed the work saying,

In the wake of a bruising presidential campaign, Americans of all faiths ought to consider how to strengthen ties to their Arab and Muslim fellow citizens. Curiel's book, though short-sighted in some ways, can play a role in persuading the skeptical that Arab and Muslim traditions are already woven deeply into the American fabric. ·

In the Fall 2009 semester, he taught a journalism course at the University of California, Los Angeles. In February 2010, he taught at Whitman College. In 2011, Curiel joined the staff of the Wikimedia Foundation as Development Communications Manager.

In 2015, Curiel's book Islam in America was published by I.B.Tauris.

== Bibliography ==
- Al' America: Travels Through America's Arab and Islamic Roots. New Press. 2008. ISBN 978-1-59558-352-9.
- Islam in America. I.B.Tauris. 2015. ISBN 9781848855984.
