= Montchat =

French Arrondissement in Lyon

- Arrondissement
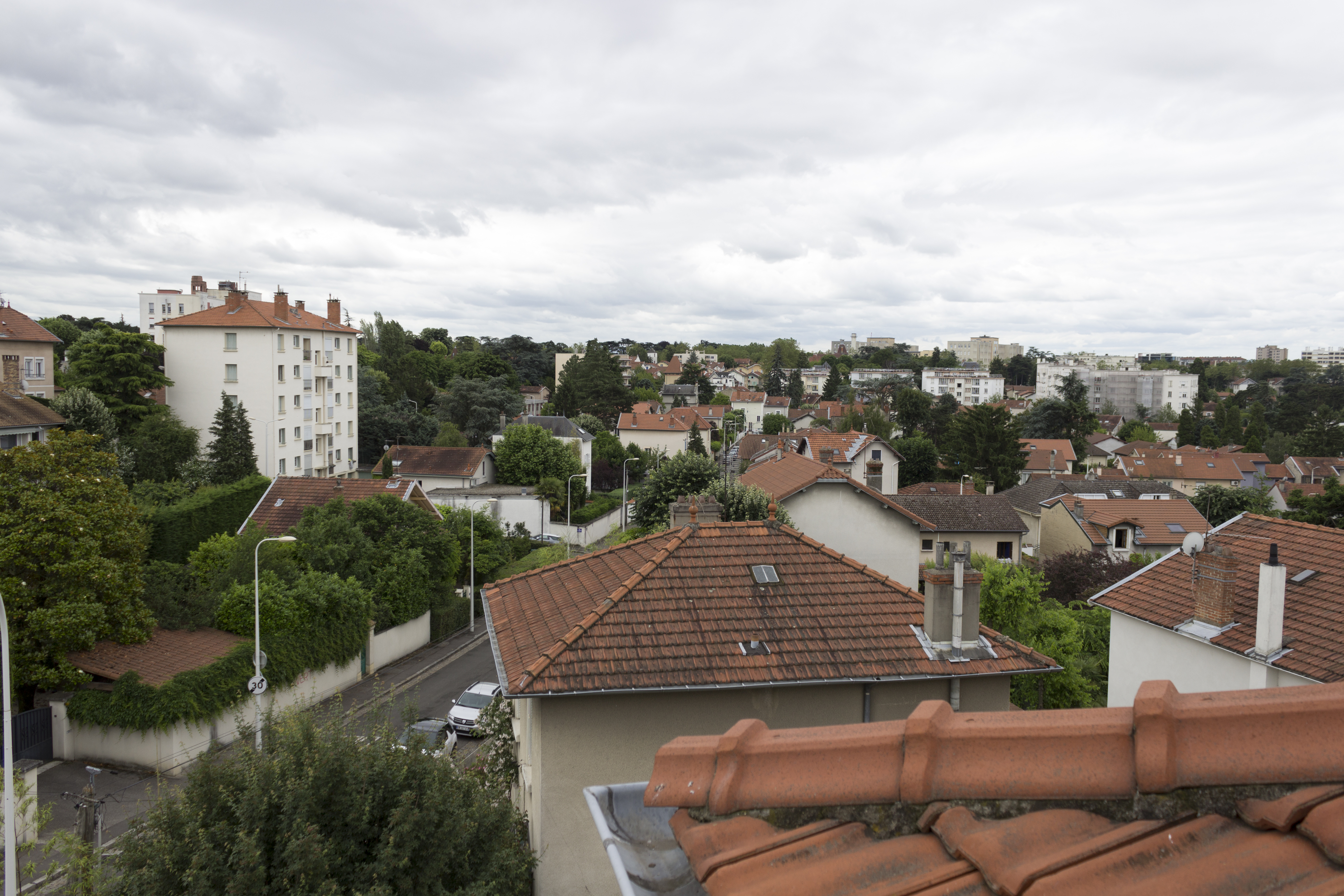
- Montchat: quartier pavillonnaire in east Lyon. 2016.

- Coordinates: 45°44′58″N 4°53′15″W

Population
  - Total: 14,320 hab. (2,013)
  - Density: 10,085/km^{2} (26,120/sq mi)

Montchat (French pronunciation: [mɔ̃ʃa]) is a district in the 3rd arrondissement of the French commune of Lyon. It forms the eastern part of the city. It ends on the east with a hill bordering Bron and adjoins Villeurbanne to the north.

On the Montchat estate, a simple country estate originally in Dauphiné, a fortified castle was built in the 16th century: Château de Montchat. Queen Christine was one of its guests. Later, in 1852, Lyon expanded and the 3rd arrondissement was created. It covers the entire area east of the Rhône. As a result, the commune of La Guillotière was absorbed, and at one of its extremities was Montchat, still sparsely populated. It was therefore in the mid-19th century that landowners responded to the demographic demands of the city center by urbanizing their estates. The subdivision plan established plots of a few hundred square meters in Montchat to keep industry out. This still leaves its mark on the neighborhood.

Now a constituent part of Lyon, this neighborhood of around 14,000 inhabitants in 2013 retains a "village spirit". Small villas line streets named after the family of the first developer, Jean Louis Richard-Vitton. They are trying to resist real estate pressure. Its predominantly residential character means that the economy is geared to local needs. As a result, the area offers a wide range of services and shops. The concern for adequate facilities, present since its emergence, persists. As a whole, the neighborhood is self-sufficient.

The château is steeped in ancient history, but the two green spaces in the heart of the urban area also hold memories of more recent times. However, social activities have been thriving for a century.

== Geography ==
=== Location ===
The Montchat district, to the east of the Rhône, forms the eastern part of the commune of Lyon. It ends on the east with a hill bordering Bron and adjoins Villeurbanne to the north. It covers an area of approximately 1,420 km^{2} (550 sq mi).

Montchat, according to data from the Institut national de l'information géographique et forestière (IGN) and customary practice, is bounded by four virtually straight (Note: The coordinates of the ends of Montchat are, according to IGN maps, as follows: to the northwest 45°45′18″N 4°52′38″W with an altitude of 177 m, to the northeast 45°45′10″N 4°53′54″W with an altitude of 182 m to the southeast 45°44′36″N 4°53′40″W with an altitude of 199 m and to the southwest 45°44′59″N 4°52′53″W with an altitude of 178 m.) roads. To the north, these are the route de Genas, Villeurbanne; to the east, boulevard Pinel and rue du Vinatier, Bron; to the south, avenue Lacassagne, the Grange Blanche district; and the west, rue Feuillat, and the Sans-Souci-Dauphiné district.

This almost corresponds to the boundaries of the neighborhood councils, but excludes the Grange Blanche estate, which has a very different origin and future. From 1913 onwards, the Grange Blanche Hospital was built, which has since become the Édouard-Herriot hospital.

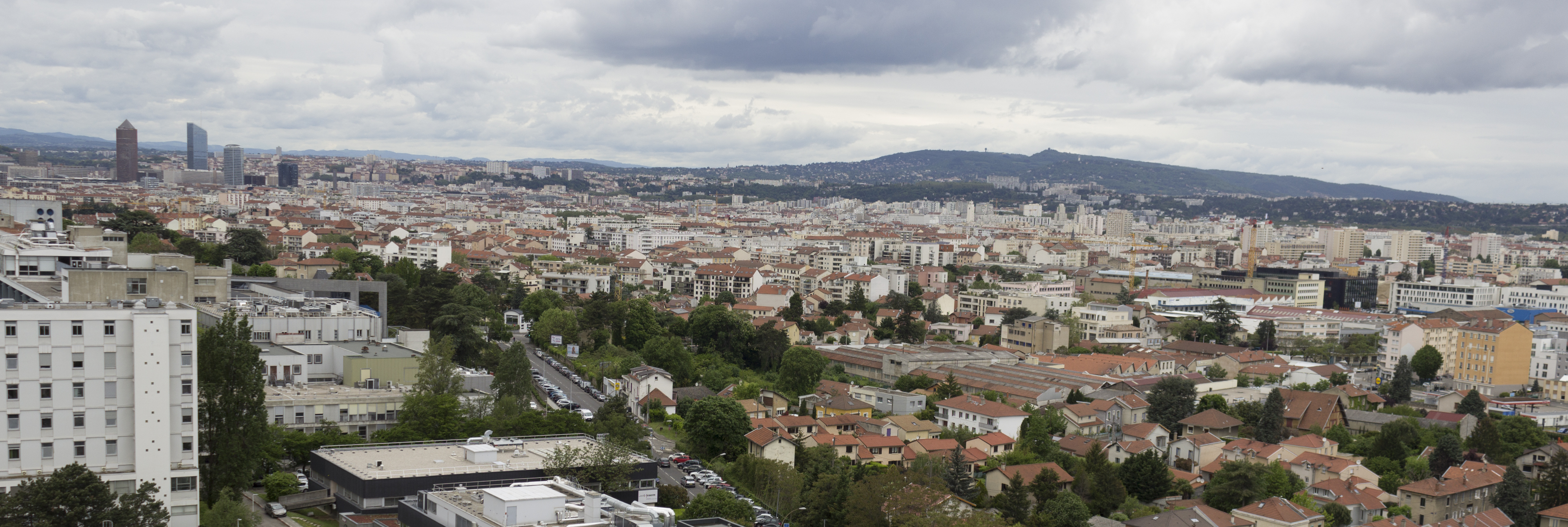
East side of Montchat: in the foreground, buildings and industrial facilities from Bron; to the north, beyond a discreet green border, buildings from Villeurbanne. (Note: Noteworthy elements can be seen by hovering the mouse over the photo on Wikimedia Commons.) 2016.

=== Geology, relief, hydrography ===
Orange solid line: neighborhood boundaries Purple dotted line: communal boundaries Moraine würmienne (Gx4) Terrasse de Villeurbanne (Fx5V) Terrasse de la Guillotière (Fx6G) Recent fluvial alluvium (Fy-z)

Lyon lies at the confluence of three geographical regions and two rivers. To the west lies the Lyon plateau, to the northeast the Dombes and to the southeast the Bas Dauphiné plain. Montchat lies at the western end of the Bas Dauphiné plain and belongs to the eastern Lyon plain.

The Bas Dauphiné plain is a Tertiary complex made up of a sedimentary series several hundred meters thick. It is made up of marly sands and molasse - a Miocene marine transgression - remodeled by the dynamics of Quaternary glaciers, with characteristic mounds known as molards. The Miocene molasse of this plain is entirely covered by glacial formations, whether boulder moraines on the hummocks and knolls, or fluvio-glacial deposits that form a thick alluvial mass of pebbles, stony sands and sometimes clay deposits below. On the eastern plain, the Rhône rises to an altitude of 162 metres. From the Rhône eastwards, three topographical units follow one another. The first is an alluvial plain (Fy-z), followed by two fluvio-glacial terraces (Fx5V and Fx6G) and, finally, the moraines (Gx4) - known as buttes - deposited by glaciers. In Montchat, where the last two formations meet, we find the Butte de Bron, with a district rising from 178 to 208 meters. The highest point is Rue Ferdinand-Buisson, which runs alongside Bron's neighbouring Parc Chambovet.

The eastern plain is characterized by its high permeability and, at Montchat, there is no surface drainage network.

=== Communications and transport ===
The beginning of the 21st century has inherited all the transport infrastructures. The vitality of the neighborhood is reflected in its development and the installation of new modes of transport.

=== Public transport ===
At the end of the 20th century, the legal structures governing public transport were transformed. The Compagnie des omnibus et tramways de Lyon (OTL) was succeeded by the Société des transports en commun de Lyon (TCL). This was later replaced by Société lyonnaise des transports en commun (SLTC), which became Keolis Lyon in 2005. Keolis is entrusted by the Syndicat mixte des transports pour le Rhône et l'agglomération lyonnaise (SYTRAL Mobilités) with the operation of the network.

Against this changing legal backdrop, Lyon's tramway system was gradually phased out. On April 15, 1948, OTL closed line no. 25 in Montchat. On the same date, it modified the route of its standard-gauge line no. 28. Traction is electric. In Montchat, the route follows avenue Lacassagne to place Henri, then runs along cours Henri (now known as Docteur-Long), ending at the corner of cours Richard-Vitton. On June 1, 1951, line no. 2 closed, followed by line no. 28 on September 2, 1951. Bus routes take their place.

Six years after the opening of the first line, the tramway returned to the district on December 6, 2006. On that date, SYTRAL opened line T3 (Part-Dieu-Villette station to Meyzieu-Z.I. station)11. It takes the former line of the Chemin de fer de l'Est de Lyon. It enters Montchat at the intersection of rue Feuillat and rue Félix (Dauphiné-Lacassagne station) and leaves it at the western end of cours Richard-Vitton (Reconnaissance-Balzac station). This line only skims the northwestern part of the district, and these two consecutive stations remain at its boundary. On November 17, 2012, SYTRAL opened the T5 line (Grange Blanche to Eurexpo)13. Only the Grange Blanche station, at the south-western end of the district, is connected to it. Here, there is an interconnection with the metro.

Finally, on September 4, 1991, SYTRAL opened line D of the Lyon metro (Gorge-de-Loup to Grange Blanche). Grange Blanche station, although not part of the line, serves the south-western end of Montchat.

=== Private vehicles ===
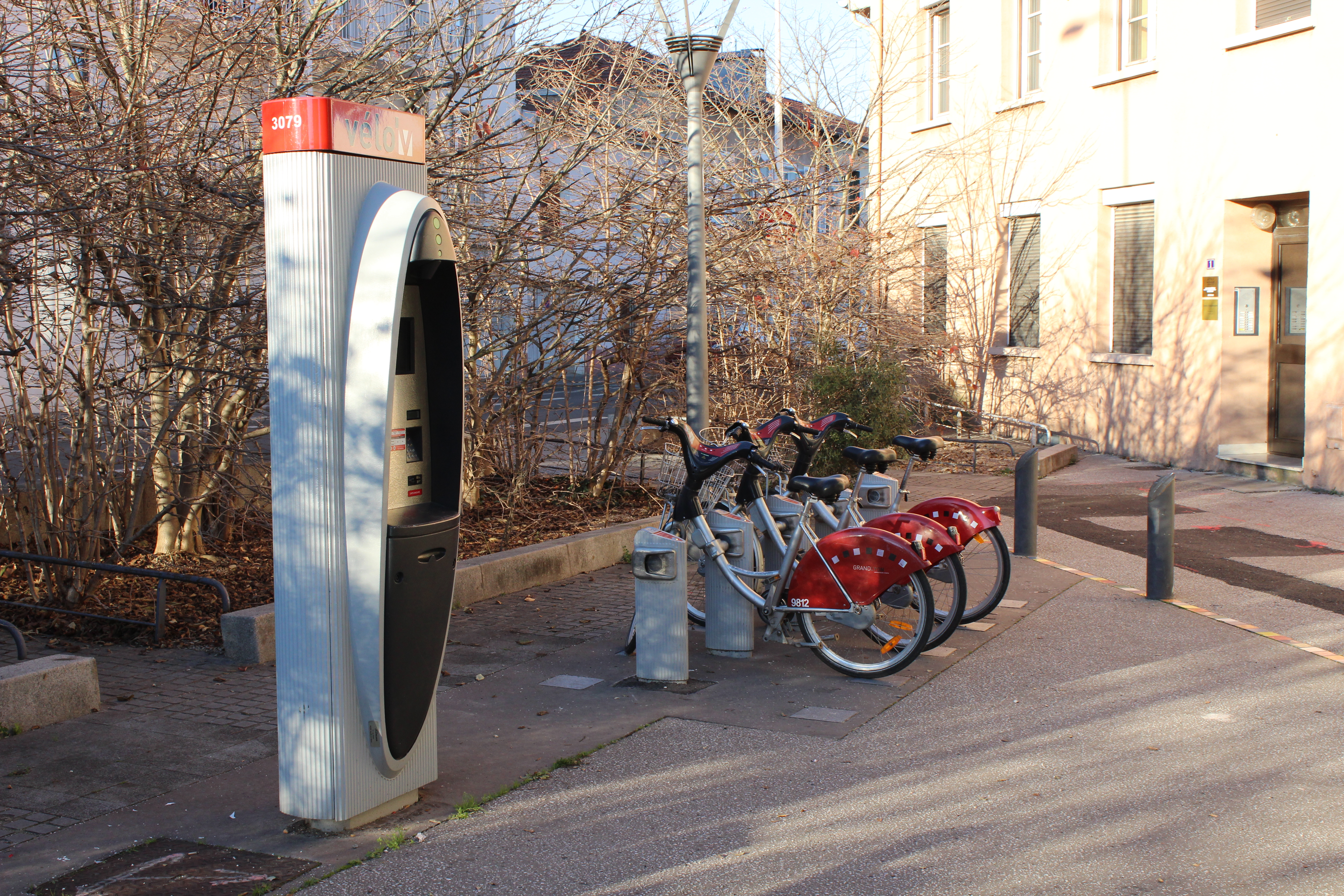
Vélo'v station at Place Louise. Bordering buildings (2014)

The number of cars in the neighborhood is high. In 2005, an estimated 61% of households owned a car, compared with 54% in Lyon, and 30% of households owned two vehicles, compared with 15% in the city. This has to do with parking difficulties. However, there are few accidents in this residential neighborhood, far from main roads and workplaces.

While a car-sharing service has existed in the conurbation since 2008 - Autolib' -, On October 10, 2013 fully electric self-service cars became available - Bluely. Of Lyon's 51 initial stations, one is located in Montchat. According to some, it may add to the parking difficulties experienced in the neighborhood. (Note: Parking is a concern in the neighborhood. The creation of a car-sharing station is welcomed by members of the neighborhood council's "transport" commission, but for others poses the problem of permanently allocated parking spaces, as evidenced by an article in Le Progrès.) A second station was installed the following year.

42% of residents own a bicycle, while only 5% own a motorbike.

On May 19, 2005, Vélo'v, a self-service bicycle rental scheme, was introduced. In 2017, it had eight stations in Montchat. This environmentally-friendly mode of transport is also appreciated by users for its low cost. However, this comes at the price of more billboards to finance the operation and ten percent of the fleet immobilized due to sometimes careless use.

== Urbanism ==
=== Urban morphology ===
Richard-Vitton's subdivision plan gave the main orientation to the alley leading to the château. The neighborhood was made up of small plots of a few hundred square meters each, served by a geometric network of narrow streets built from Rue Henri - now Cours Docteur-Long - parallel to the allée du château. This subdivision is dominated by two-storey pavilions, often associated with a service or craft activity. Today, these houses are still often surrounded by a small garden with a cedar or plane tree, and have a wisteria-decorated entrance. The district's original fabric of townhouses and small apartment buildings has been largely replaced by more recent, higher-rise buildings [but] the district center is set in the heart of a residential, largely planted fabric where densities remain relatively low". However, "the Monchat district is subject to strong land pressure, with numerous interventions over the past twenty years contributing to its deterioration".

=== Street naming ===
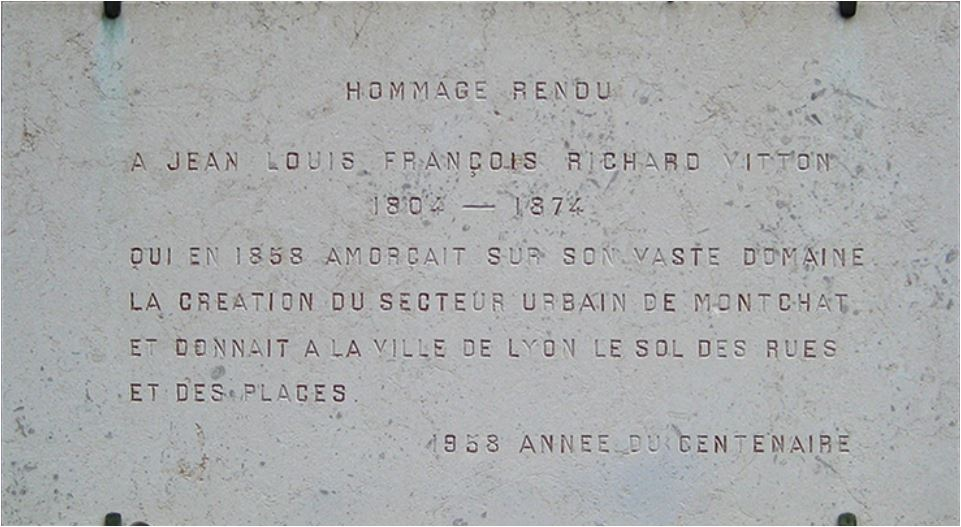
Plaque commemorating Jean Louis Richard-Vitton and his policy of urbanizing Montchat. (1958)

In 1990, Maurice Vanario, archivist for the City of Lyon, produced an odonymy of the streets of Lyon, in particular those of Montchat. (Note: The first names and surnames of the Richard-Vitton family, which are used to name the roads - some of which have changed - are referenced on an IGN map, the Richard-Viton subdivision plan visible on Wikimedia Commons, the works of Georges Bazin and Maurice Vanario, and data from civil registers, which are mentioned at various points in the text.) On May 28, 2008, on the occasion of Montchat's 150th anniversary, Alain Richard-Vitton, a descendant of the founder, recalled the origins of the district and its street names.

=== First names district ===
The first names of Richard-Vitton's sons and their spouses or ascendants are frequently found. However, there is no strict agreement with the civil registry; these are probably first names in use.

- Rue Amélie: first name of the wife of Henry Constantin Marie's second son, Mlle Kœnig became rue Jean-Cardona in 1935.
- Place and rue Antoinette: first name of Mrs. Richard-Vitton's mother.
- Rue Camille: third name of fifth and last son.
- Rue Charles-Richard: first name and surname of eldest son. Around 1860, it was named Rue Richard-Laforest, which links the two families since Charles Richard and Julie Laforest were married. (Note: It is likely that the street was renamed after the conviction of former Lyon mayor Démophile Laforest on December 13, 1864.)
- Place and rue Claudia: first name of Mrs. Richard-Vitton's maternal grandmother (actually Claudine (born Merle)). Became Rue Viala in 1913.
- Rue Constant: middle name of second son (actually Constantin).
- Place et cours Henri: first name of Mme Richard-Vitton's father (actually Henry), former mayor of La Guillotière became Cours du Docteur-Long, a resistance fighter, in 1945.
- Rue Julie: first name of the wife of Charles Pierre's eldest son, Mlle Laforest. (Note: She was the daughter of Démophile Laforest, who was no longer mayor of Lyon at the time of the wedding.)
- Rue Julien: first name of third son.
- Rue Louis: first name of fourth son.
- Place Louise: first name of Mrs. Richard-Vitton.
- Rue Louise: third name of a granddaughter of Richard-Vitton, daughter of Marie Charles Camille.

=== Tributes ===
The family names are less specific. Some bear witness to the Richard-Vitton family.

- Rue Besson: named after a great-grandmother of Mrs. Richard-Vitton. When extended, became rue Basse-Besson (before the farm, to the west), rue Besson, and rue Gérente (after rue Sainte-Marie, to the east). Acquired the name rue Ferdinand-Buisson in 1892.
- Rue Bonnand: maiden name of Mme Richard-Vitton's mother (actually Bonand).
- Rue du Capitaine: Julien Émile Richard, third son, was captain of the Rhône Mobiles around 1858.
- Rue Chambovet: maiden name of Mr. Richard-Vitton's mother.
- Cours Eugénie: tribute paid by Richard-Vitton to Empress Eugénie de Montijo, wife of Napoleon III.
- Rue Kœnigsberg: a popular transformation of Kœnig bey, the Egyptian name and honorific title of Henry Constantin Marie's second son's father-in-law. Became Rue Piperoux before 1868.
- Cours Richard-Vitton: initially, in 1858, simply Richard from the owner's civil status name. Then, on his donation in 1875, the town council honored the latter's customary name. (Note: The illustrated subdivision plan, taken from Georges Bazin's book, shows Cours Richard, while the insert reads "Plan joint à la demande de M. Richard Vitton [...]".)

=== Richard-Vitton course ===
The Cours Richard-Vitton begins at Place de la Reconnaissance and ends at Place Kimmerling, in the commune of Bron.

Named Cours Richard on the 1858 subdivision plan, this road is described as "a path 1,212 meters long and 12 meters wide, laid out in a straight line in the Montchat district ". Valued at 21,000 francs, it was ceded free of charge by Mrs. Widow Richard-Vitton to the Lyon municipality, which accepted it on December 30, 1875 and designated it as "chemin vicinal ordinaire no 154, dit cours Richard-Vitton".

At present, this course is a shopping street, especially in the section between Place Antoinette and Place Ronde.

=== Housing ===
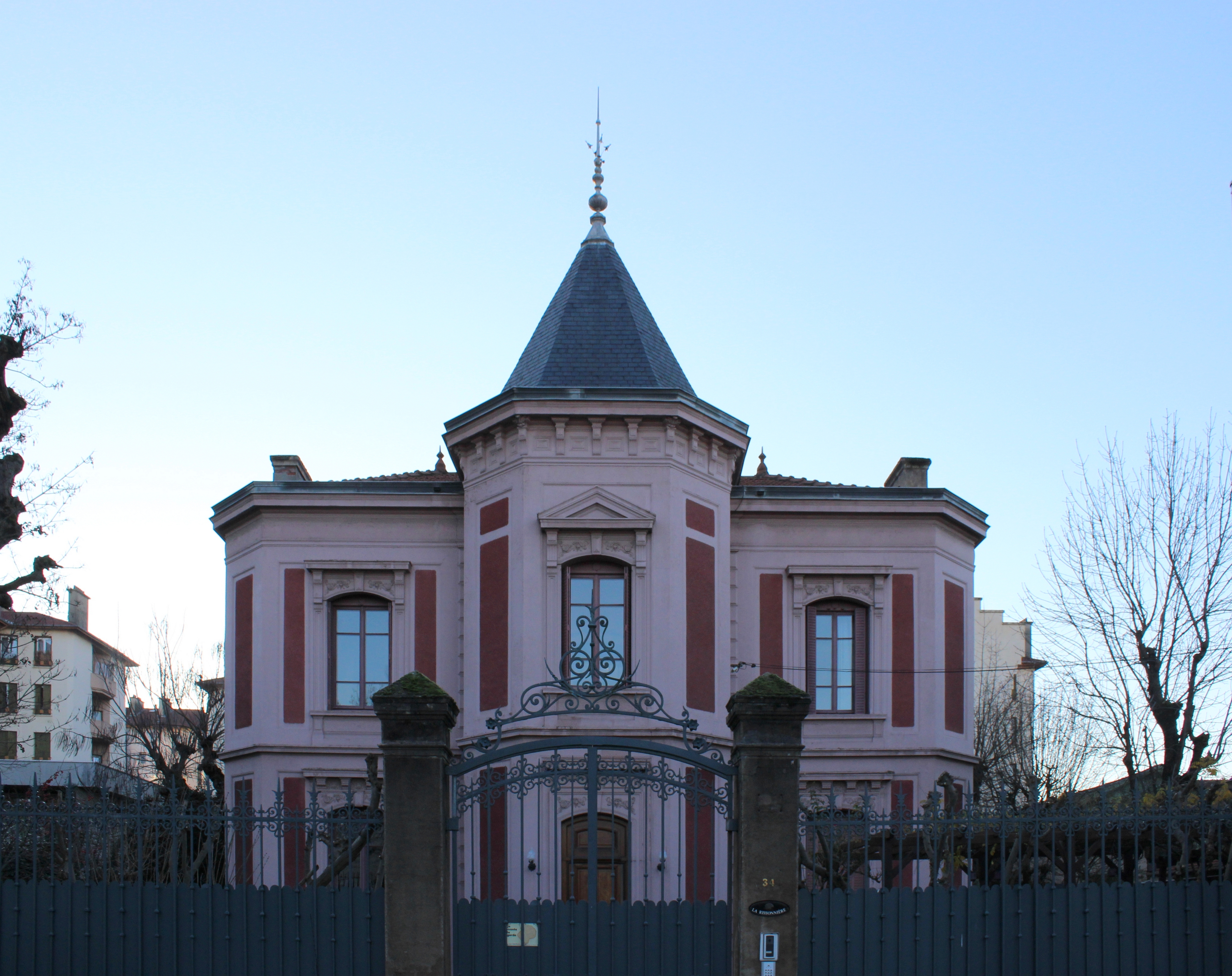
La Rissonnière. Montchat bourgeois villa. Buildings in the background (2014).

In 1904, Montchat was considered a "suburb of Lyon", and remained so in 1934. By the end of the 20th century, the district was fully integrated into the city. The suburbs are located beyond the surrounding communes.

"The predominance of single-family homes, built without a master plan, makes it a sought-after village neighborhood." But the neighborhood's "village spirit" is proving hard to resist in the face of real estate pressure. In 2012, for the whole of Lyon, the Institut national de la statistique et des études économiques (Insee), indicated that 2.9% of residents lived in houses and 95.7% in apartments. In 2014, the borough mayor reported that "there are now nine hundred and fifty houses in Montchat". And according to him, single-family homes account for "19% of Montchat housing, with 81% of people living in apartments", so proportionally, single-family homes are about six times more common in Montchat than in the whole of Lyon.

These homes are occupied by a mature population. People aged 50 to 59 make up 14% of the population, whereas in Lyon they account for only 11%, and people over 60 make up 24%, whereas in the city they account for 19% of the population.

=== Natural and technological risks ===
The Natural Risk Prevention Plan (PPRN), as of February 2009, clearly states that Montchat is not at risk of flooding. This situation, although not formalized in an administrative document, was already known at the time of the historic Rhône flood of 1856 in Lyon. This is one of the reasons for the urbanization of the district.

== Toponymy ==
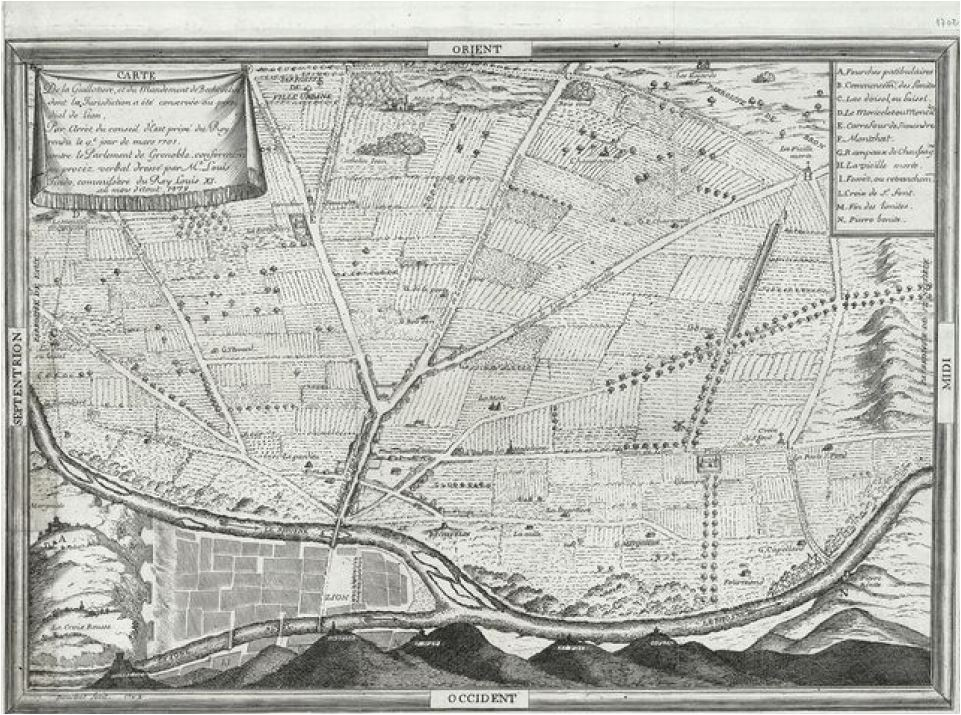
Map of La Guillotière. In "F", Montchat. (Bouchet 1702) (Note: Bouchet's plan, visible on Wikimedia Commons, named Montchat in 1702. This is visible at the "F" point at the upper edge and to the left of the center of the plan.)

The name of the locality is mentioned, probably for the first time, in 1479 in the form Montchal:

"[... ] et dudit carreffour nous [nous] transportasmes par le chemin par lequel on va de Lyon à Genas jusques au boys de Monchal et dudit chemin par ung autre petit chemin traversant le hault desdits boys de Monchal et tirant à ung carrefour estant au chemin par lequel on va de Lyon à Braon, appelé ledit carrefour le Rempaut (Note: Rempaut for Rameau, boxwood. The boxwood in question must have been the "bush" in which the cross was planted, and its size no doubt made it remarkable.) de Chassaignes ouquel a une croix de bois estang en ung buisson; [...]".

Montchal can also be dated to 1700 or 1710 (Note: Rempaut for Rameau, boxwood. The boxwood in question must have been the "bush" in which the cross was planted, and its size no doubt made it remarkable.) on the Plan général du bourg de la Guillotière, mandement de Béchevelin en Dauphiné, dedicated to Monsieur le marquis de Rochebonne, commander pour le roi dans le Lyonnois, Forez et Beaujolois by his most humble servant Mornand, syndic of the aforementioned town, which bears the name Montchal. (Note: This plan can be seen on Wikimedia Commons.) At 1702, the Carte de la Guillotière et du mandement de Béchevelin [...] published by Bouchet, according to the 1479 survey, mentions Montchat as such. (Note: Bouchet's plan, visible on Wikimedia Commons, names Montchat in 1702. This is visible at the "F" point, at the upper edge and to the left of the center of the plan.) This is the current name.

This is a medieval toponymic formation in Mont- undoubtedly predating its first mention. Its interpretation is straightforward: it's Gallo-Romance MONTE "elevation, height, hill", derived from the accusative montem of the Latin word mons "mountain" or, more directly, from the Franco-Provençal mont "elevation, hill, mountain", which derives from it, given the uncertainty surrounding the date of the toponym's establishment.

The identification of the second element -chat is more problematic, given the scarcity of available early forms. In any case, it's not the animal, since it seems established that some old forms are of the Montchal type until the eighteenth century, which became *Montcha by apocope. As is often the case, the element *-cha having become opaque, was reinterpreted as -chat, after the animal, "mont du chat" making sense.

Montchal is the name of several communes and hamlets in the region, including Montchal (Loire, Mont Chal 1225; Montchal 1312; Monte Chalmo 1352; Monte Chalme 1404; Montiscalm 1431), whose medieval Latin forms distinctly refer to a *calmis word meaning, on the plains: "unproductive land, usually meadowland". In the Pre-Alps and Alps: "mountain pasture, above the forest limit, grassy summit, often difficult to access and sparsely vegetated". It is considered pre-Indo-European by some and Gallic by others.

Regularly, the [ka] group palatalized in Franco-Provençal, hence [t͡ʃa] then [ʃa] "cha". Thus *calmis is identified in the region as a toponymic element in the forms Cha, Châ, Chal, Chale, Chaume, etc. and numerous derivatives.

== History ==
=== Origins ===
Montchat was originally a wooded area (Note: The wooded nature of the area is attested to by a report from 1479, the woods shown on the Mornand map in 1700, and André Steyert, who wrote in 1876: "It was at the end of this road that the Montchat woods were located, traces of which remain.) on the left bank of the Rhône. However, for two millennia, the Rhône, which was difficult to cross, acted as a frontier. The future foundations of Lyon were on the opposite bank. This location meant that it belonged to the Viennese balmes (Note: In the Lyon region, balmes refers to steep hillsides, slopes, or embankments.) and was therefore sheltered from the river's frequent flooding.

The left riverbank expanded, and in 1075 the church of Saint-Alban, dedicated to the early fourth-century martyr, was built. Its "location appears to be the present-day Saint-Alban chapel at Montplaisir". (Note: Not to be confused with the Notre-Dame-Saint-Alban church opened in 1924 on the same rue Laennec.) (Note: "It was downgraded in the last third of the 16th century, when the population moved to La Guillotière. [This] edifice, dating from the second half of the xie century, [...] now serves as a chapel for a hospice for incurables", and was destroyed between November 5 and 7, 1971.) This is the church of the small village of Chaussagne, also known as La Chesnaie. Its highest point is known today as the "Butte de Bron". At the time, Chaussagne was one of three parishes in the mandement of Béchevelin (Bêche-en-Velin). (Note: According to Louis Maynard, quoted by Gérard Chauvy, "the word 'Bèche' refers to the flat-bottomed boats used to cross the Rhône, and 'Velin' means 'little calfskin'", but Georges Bazin differs: "Bêches were boats covered with tents, used to cross the river from Lyon to Velin (name of the territories on the left bank of the Rhône)".) This mandement proved to be strategic. Probably to defend a gateway to the city of Lyon, Archbishop Jean Belles-mains had the Béchevelin fortified castle built at the end of the 12th century. (Note: In the mid-sixteenth century, the remains of Béchevelin's fortified castle could still be seen in the form of "a circular mass, topped by a slender tower, and surrounded, at the base of the mound, by a crenellated enclosure that served as a first line of defence".) At the same time, the Guillotière bridge was built, gradually transforming La Guillotière into a suburb of Lyon62. From here, various communication routes led to the Genas road, which joined La Guillotière to Genas and formed the northern boundary of the estate.

From August 13 to September 23, 1479, Louis XI commissioned commissioner Louis Tindo to geographically demarcate the territories of La Guillotière and the mandement de Béchevelin. Despite the territorial survey of 1339, commissioned by Humbert II, dauphin of Vienne, and aimed at selling his property, (Note: Initially, the Dauphiné was to be sold to Pope Benedict XII, but in the end, King Philippe VI of France acquired it on April 23, 1343.) this mandement, located east of the Rhône and therefore in the Dauphiné, remained the subject of a dispute between the Grenoble parliament and the Lyon presidial. This is the first time that the name Montchal is mentioned as a locality in the village of Chaussagne- which belongs to the mandement of Béchevelin. (Note: Based on this survey, Louis XIV decided on March 9, 1701 that this jurisdiction would remain with the Lyon pésidial.) (Note: It appears that maps from the early 18th century included Montchat in the territory of La Guillotière. Such is the case of Cassini's sheet 118, surveyed between 1758 and 1760, details of which can be seen on Wikimedia Commons.)

Agriculture was also on the rise. This was not a traditional activity in the region due to the poor soil, but in the 18th century, it met the needs of the neighboring town. (Note: On Richard-Vitton's mid-19th-century map, a farm testifies to the agricultural activity of the Montchat lands - "the Bonfy family, farmers of Richard-Vitton, were still in business in 1936".)

=== Castle occupants ===
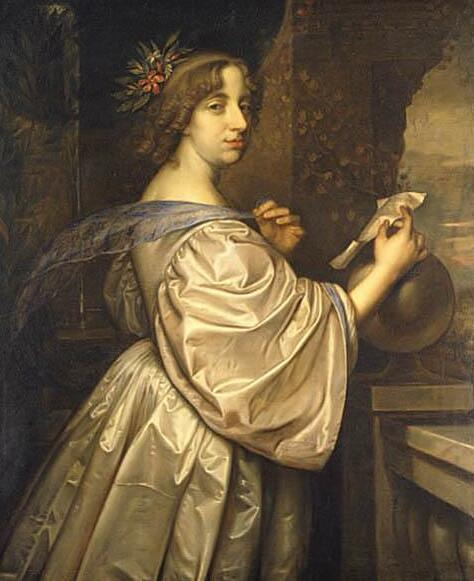
Christine, Queen of Sweden, according to David Beck (c. 1656).

On November 20, 1534, Loys Ennemond and Flory Prost, heirs of Pierre Prost, the first known owner of the estate, sold the Montchat lands, a total of 230 hectares, to Jehan Catherin, concierge of the Lyon prisons. Thus, "a terrier [...] dating from 1534 and written in Latin, [...] specifies the name of the owner of this fief: 'Terrarium loci de Montchard Parochia Chaussagnae nobilis Jehan Catherin' which means: 'Terrier du lieu de Montchard de la paroisse de Chaussagne, à noble Jehan Catherin"'. He had a fortified house built, which is now known as the château. The estate and fortified house then became the property of Gaspard and Jean de Laube, lords of Bron, who in turn transferred it to François Basset on March 19, 1638. Basset was one of Lyon's aldermen.

Christine, Queen of Sweden, spent three weeks in August 1657 at the Montchat fortified house. This was her second trip to the French Court. Coming from the Court of Savoy, she wished to meet Mazarin once again to arrange a loan and secretly finalize the capture of the Kingdom of Naples, then in Spanish possession - since she had no heir, upon her death the Kingdom of France would install a Bourbon dynasty. The absence of any response to his letters made it uncertain how he would be received. This second trip was much less lavish than the first when the city of Lyon had graciously received her with great honors. She informed the Lyon consulate that she would cover the costs of her stay and leave it up to her to choose her place of residence. He asked Sieur François Basset to lend his home for the occasion - a pleasant place to stay in summer, given its location outside the town. The consulate received her courteously, greeting her on her arrival on August 9 and sending her daily gifts. Once again greeted by a representative of the consulate, the Queen of Sweden left Montchat on August 28, 1657 for Fontainebleau.

Following this stay, the former alderman requested compensation for the damage caused to the vineyards and furniture by the illustrious host's retinue. Five hundred and fifty livres tournois were awarded. (Note: "Order for noble François Basset, ex-consul of this ville, of the sum of five hundred and fifty livres tournois that ordered to compensate him for what he suffered in his house of Moncha size in La Guillotière, both in his vineyards and for the deterioration of some furniture in which house the Consulate had asked him to want to lodge the Queen of Sweden when she passed through the village. And reporting the present management and quittance.")

On May 14, 1682, his son Jean-François Basset, "écuyer, ci-devant maître des requêtes de la feue Reine, mère de Sa Majesté", ceded, according to the notarized deed, "the house, estate, and tenement of Montchat, size en la paroisse de cette ville de Lyon [... ] several buildings, courtyards, walled gardens, sown lands and others, vineyards, woods, meadows, located both near the house and in the place of Vilurbanne (sic) in Dauphiné, with all the said outbuildings, rights, and belongings of the said house". The new owners are des Bernardins, the reverend fathers of the Congrégation de Notre-Dame des Feuillants, Order of Cîteaux, from the Saint-Charles monastery in the city of Lyon.

On January 3, 1689, the Fathers sold the land to Jacques Besson, after renting it to him for one year. The deed specifies the boundaries of Montchat's two hundred and thirty hectares. The property, worth nine thousand pounds and ten ecrennes louis, is "bounded to the north by the Chemin de Lyon à Genas [now route de Genas], to the east by chemin Vinatier (since called boulevard Pinel), to the south by Chemin de Lyon à Saint-Laurent (avenue Rockefeller - Grande rue de la Guillotière), while to the west it reaches as far as the gates of La Guillotière". This notary and royal councillor on rue Mercière in Lyon is the ancestor of all those who would later make up the history of Montchat.

His son Pierre had six children, including Louise, who married Mathieu Bonand on November 22, 1729. His son Luc (Note: Luc Bonand - misspelled Bonaud by the registrar - married Claudine Merle on June 24, 1793.) was the last to bear the title of seigneur de Montchat et de L'Hormat. (Note: L'Hormat, near the Ferrandière woods, is located in Villeurbanne. They are visible on the excerpt from Cassini map no. 118 on Wikimedia Commons. Its approximate boundaries are Rue Jean-Jaurès, Rue Antonin-Perrin, and Route de Genas.) During the Terror, the estate was sequestered, then returned after the 9th of Thermidor. Antoinette Bonand, daughter of Luc, married Henry Vitton, future mayor of La Guillotière, on January 8, 1811. Louise Françoise Vitton was born of this marriage.

=== Urbanization ===
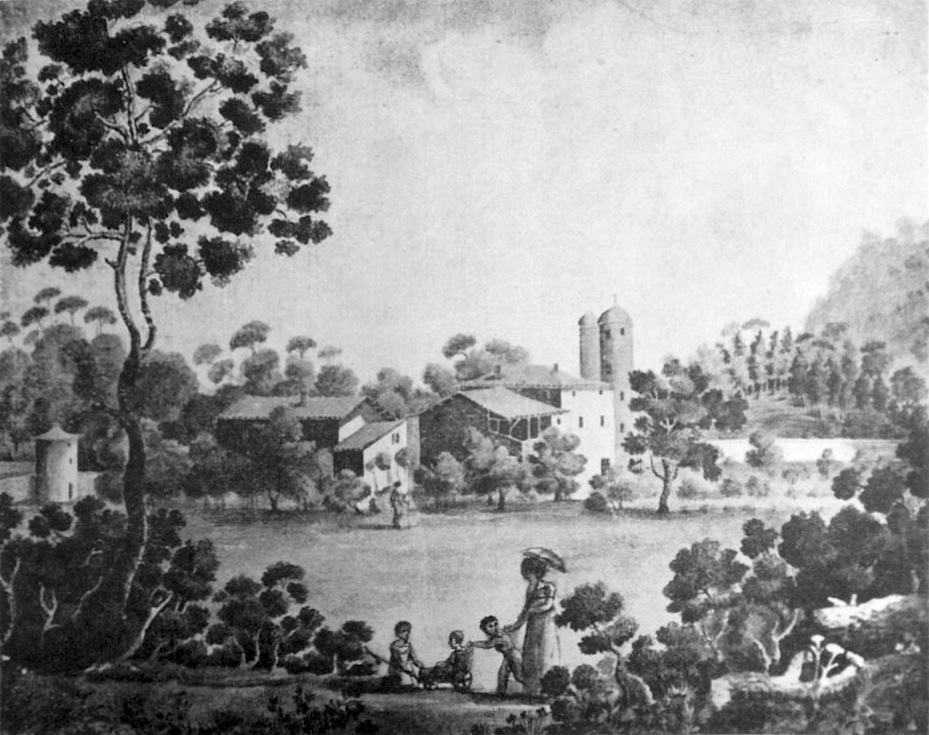
Château de Montchat in the early 19th century. (Note: Two illustrations describe the Château de Montchat. The first, entitled Le Château de Montchat au début du XIXe siècle, shows two towers, one and a half times the height of the building, each topped by a pepperpot. The second is a postcard showing, adjacent to the south-west corner, a single tower, this time crenelated and topped on the north side by a pepperpot; it is entitled: Le Château de Montchat circa 1900 (current state).)

==== Actors ====
In 1831, Louise Françoise Vitton married Jean Louis François Richard (Note: Five children were born of this union: in Saint-Chamond, Charles Pierre (April 19, 1832), Henry Constantin Marie (February 27, 1834), Julien Émile (May 6, 1838), Louis (March 10, 1842) and in La Guillotière, Marie Charles Camille (August 9, 1846).) son of Charles-François Richard, a pioneer in the industrialization of shoelace manufacture. In 1839, the latter's assets consisted of part of the capital of the Fabrique Richard frères transferred by his father. He soon sold his share and lived off his income. Richard associates his name with that of his wife, and deeds concerning Montchat appear under the initials "Richard-Vitton". He was deputy mayor of La Guillotière, (Note: Contrary to what some sources claim, he was not mayor of La Guillotière. On his tombstone in the old La Guillotière cemetery, this inscription, present for his father-in-law, is absent for him. Similarly, the Bulletin des lois de l'Empire français does not recognize him as such.) to which the Montchat countryside was attached. Lyon then absorbed this commune on March 24, 1852. Succeeding M. Charbonnier, he became mayor of Lyon's 3rd arrondissement from 1857 to September 4, 1870, the date of the Lyon Commune. He died on February 22, 1874.

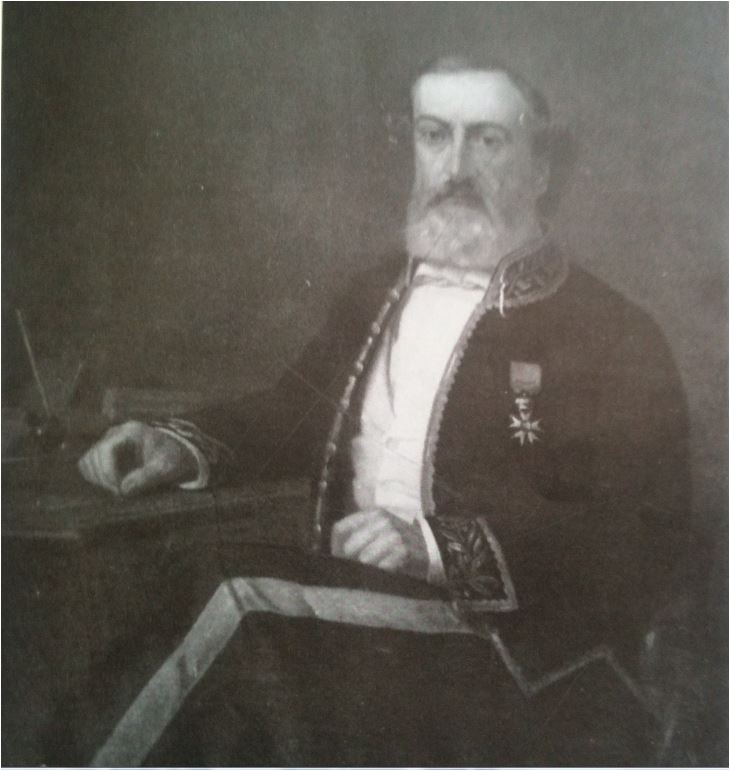
Jean Louis Richard-Vitton, mayor bearing the Legion of Honor (Note: Jean Louis François Richard, who took the name Richard-Vitton, became a Chevalier de la Légion d'Honneur on September 20, 1860, in recognition of his twenty years' service as deputy mayor of Saint-Chamond (Loire) and then mayor of Lyon's 3rd arrondissement.) (1860~1870).

==== Habitat ====
As part of an urbanization policy, this landowner decided to sell a large part of his land - seventy-eight hectares - and kept 174,564 m^{2} walled around the château, according to Mme Richard-Vitton's deed of gift-sharing dated October 31, 1883. In these parts and at this date, this approach is understood as "a development left largely to the individual initiative of speculative owners concerned only with their local interests".

Monchat's elevated position was a popular feature after the Rhône flood of 1856. At the same time, Prefect Vaïsse's major construction projects were driving the working class away from the center. "In a letter to the Prefect on October 27, 1858, Richard-Vitton proposed to offer [for a fee] "a new outlet for the less well-off class, where they can settle at low cost in the best possible hygienic conditions ".

The press presents conditions that seem advantageous to buyers. The plots are at a distance from the grants. During an initial nine-year lease at 2 centimes per square meter, the acquisition is possible for 2 francs per square meter. This lease is to be renewed, if requested, for a further nine years at a rent of 15 centimes per square meter and the opportunity to become an owner for 3 francs per square meter.

Following the plan he drew up, which was little altered by the municipal administration, Richard-Vitton ensured the creation of small plots with houses surrounded by a garden. This was to prevent the construction of any factories. Arthur Kleinclausz, quoted by Thierry Joliveau, writes "[...] it was specified in many contracts that the land sold would not be used to build factories, but rather workers' houses and villas".

Moreover, since this was a real estate transaction, any transfer to the city was made in return for equivalent land.

After Mrs Richard-Vitton's death on January 4, 1890, the ban on factories was maintained. Some deeds of transfer stipulate: "The purchasers [...] may not install or allow to be installed any mechanical sawmill, factory, plant or large chimney".

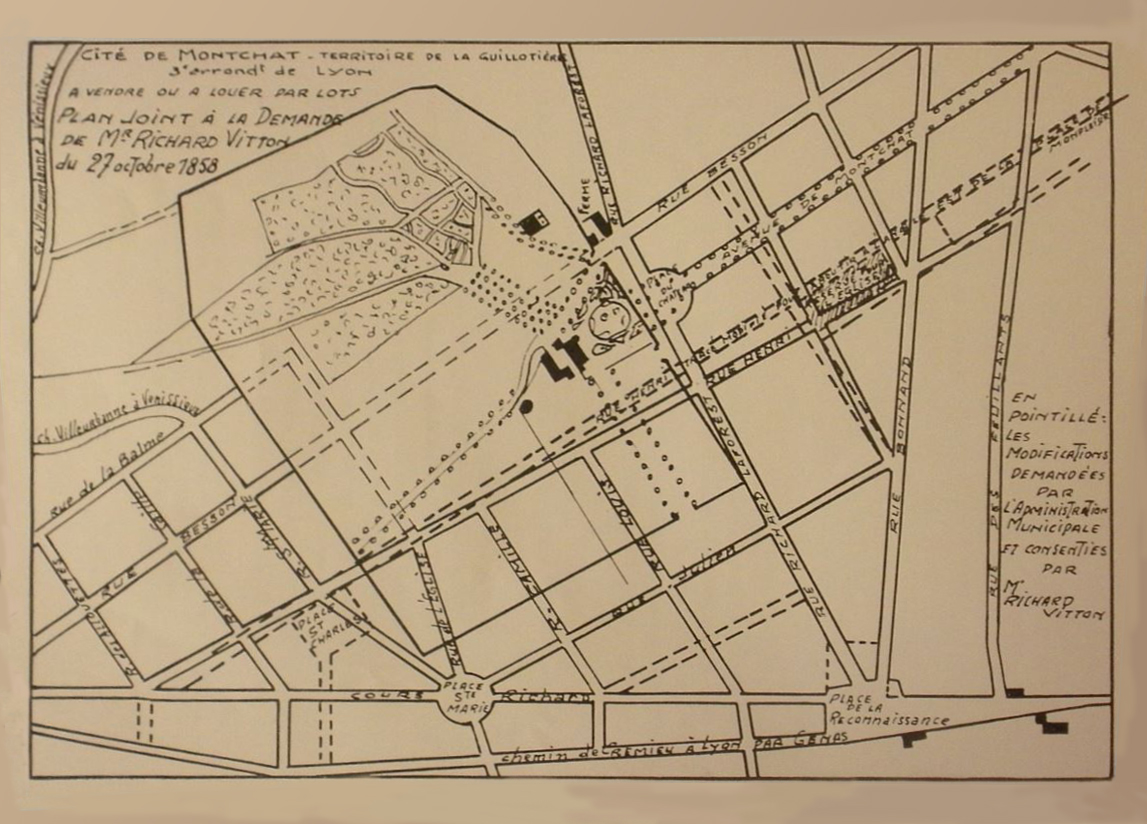
Montchat subdivision plan drawn up by M. Richard-Vitton on October 27, 1858, for sale or lease by lots.

==== Roads ====
The development and maintenance of the road network is carried out by offering the City the soil of the roads, 12 km of streets, and four squares, 180,000 m^{2}. As in all such cases, this is a matter of debate for the City Council: acceptance of this land is not a foregone conclusion. The opening of roads by private individuals or institutions is a frequent occurrence. In such cases, the owner is responsible for the costs.

For example, on June 27, 1872, the municipal council approved Richard-Vitton's proposal to sell 1.710 km of private road (24,700 m^{2}) free of charge, "subject to the express reservation that the City will have the option of completing these three roads only as and when the resources applicable to the byways allow".

Similarly, on July 3, 1879, his widowed wife wrote that she would donate Rue Claudia (Note: Rue Claudia, which became rue Viala in 1911, is described as follows: "The street in question is a private road whose soil belongs to the Richard-Vitton family. It is located in the Montchat district, which it crosses in part from north to south, between rue Besson-Basse [which in 1932 became part of rue Ferdinand-Buisson] and route de Grenoble [which in 1923 became avenue Rockefeller in this section].) to the town. But in 1906, given the cost of development, the councilors continued to refuse the donation. However, residents wanted this private road to become municipal. Acceptance only came in 1912 (thirty-three years later), when the road was "classified as an ordinary suburban road ".

These passageways already existed, but were too narrow according to Louis-Gabriel Delerue, the engineer in charge of developing the Left Bank. He wanted a width of twelve meters to make Montchat a suburb similar to London. This view clashed with that of Richard-Vitton.

==== Church ====
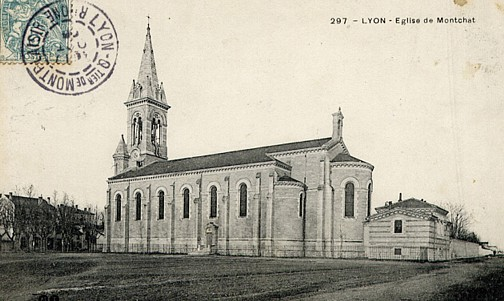
Notre-Dame-du-Bon-Secours church (circa 1900).

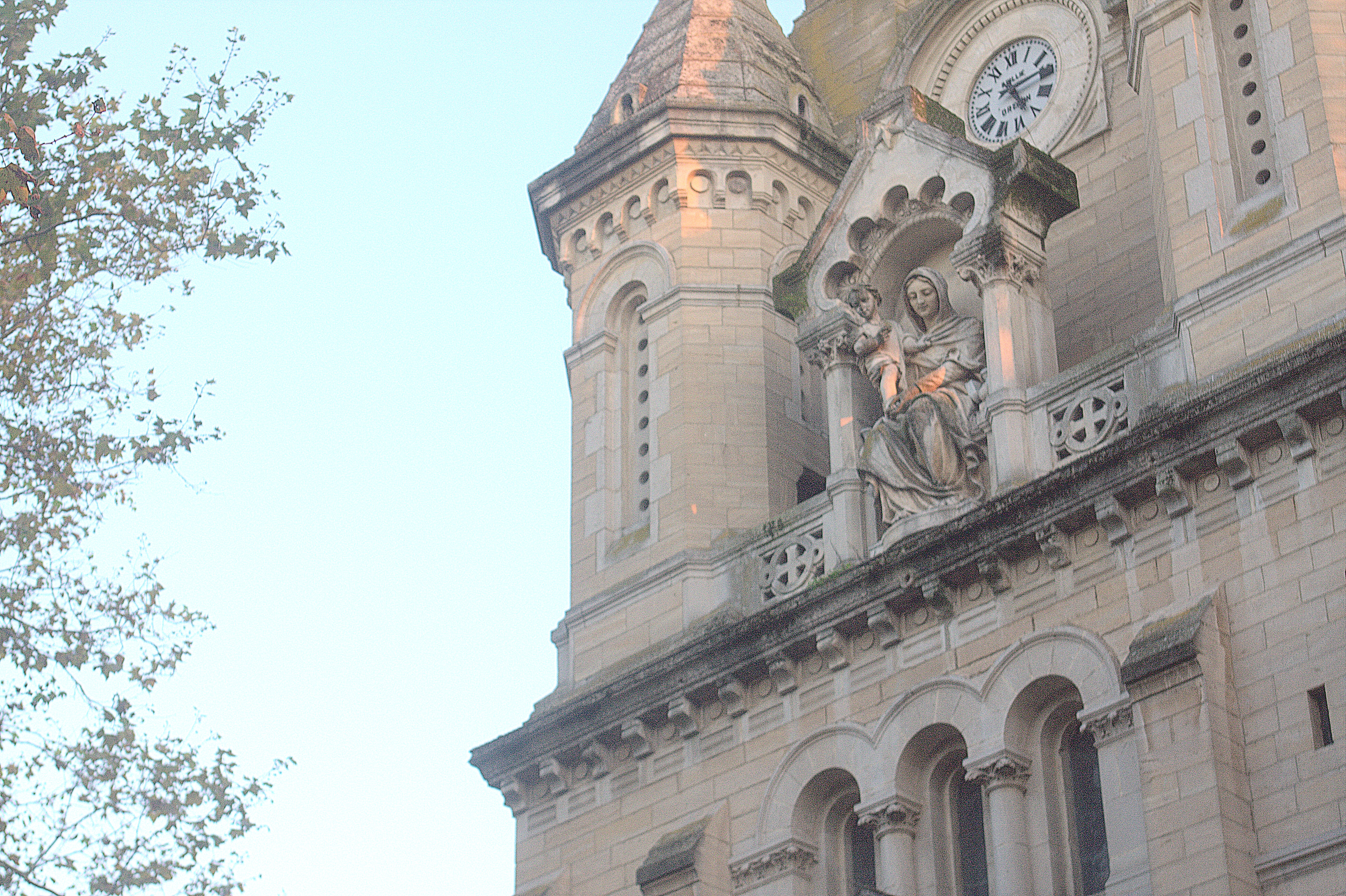
Above the porch, a statue of Notre-Dame-du-Bon-Secours by Frédéric Bayet-Biot.

Rue de l'Église, to the north of the neighborhood, is a reminder that Montchatois had to go to the church of the Petites-Sœurs-des-Pauvres de La Villette to perform their devotions. "In 1871, the Fabrique received nearly 10,000 m^{2} of land, valued at 60,000 francs, with a formal clause to build a church, an asylum, a presbytery, and schools. Two years later, the same Richard-Vitton offered an additional 60,000 francs generated by the construction of the first part of the church (95,000 francs). Another, unofficial letter "literally demands an affable parish priest, from one of the downtown parishes, 'who will be able through his connections to obtain what he lacks' ". The construction of this church also added value to the surrounding land. On July 20, 1874, the building permit for the church was signed by Marshal Mac Mahon. The lot initially planned for the corner of cours Henri and rue Bonnand in 1858 was abandoned in favor of a 10,577 m^{2} plot of land located towards rue Besson-Basse and rue Charles-Richard, and sold for this purpose on October 23, 1874 by Mme Richard-Vitton, widowed on February 22, 1874104. After a provisional chapel on avenue du château in 1873 was opened for worship, Notre-Dame-du-Bon-Secours was opened on June 13, 1875. It was enlarged between 1891 and 1894, and consecrated on September 1 and 2, 1894. The surrounding 1,800 m^{2} green space was inaugurated on March 9, 2016.

==== Schools ====
As part of "a mass schooling movement", new schools appeared. In 1872, a boys' school was opened at no. 101 cours Henri. In 1881, when the lease expired, part of the building at no. 19 Place Louise was rented. In 1890, the Montchat nursery school was opened, the construction of which had been decided on July 30, 1889. It was located on rue Louise. These schools were later replaced by the current ones.

==== Transport ====
Downtown Lyon was initially located far from Montchat. But it appears that "the development of this sector is linked to the boom in public transport, which facilitates travel "67.

==== Tramways ====
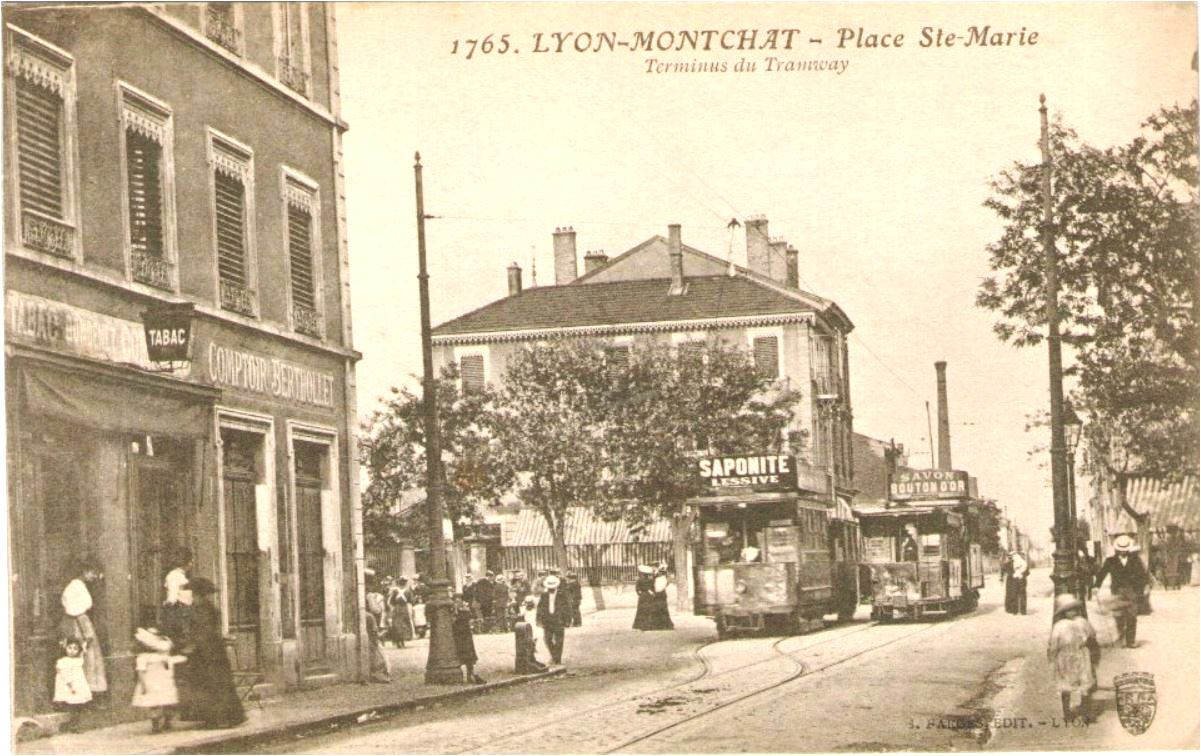
Place Sainte-Marie (now Place Ronde). Tramway terminus (before 1914).

On August 1, 1881, the Compagnie des omnibus et transports lyonnais (OTL) opened one of its first ten lines, No. 2 (Bellecour - Montchat). It is a normal track. This tramway has horse-drawn traction. It enters the district via the route de Genas, follows the Cours Richard-Vitton and ends at Place Ronde. On March 24, 1898, the line was electrified. (Note: Line no. 2 depended on the Montchat depot, of which nothing remains. Despite its name, it is located in Villeurbanne, route de Genas.)

On July 5, 1889, the Compagnie lyonnaise de tramways (CLT) opened the Pins depot at the corner of chemin des Pins (now avenue Lacassagne) and chemin Feuillat. The depot includes a boiler. Each boiler - or locomotive - is filled with compressed steam. On January 11, 1890, locomotive no. 4 exploded, resulting in a number of fatalities. To protect passengers, service was temporarily suspended. The depot continued to operate with OTL, which stopped running streetcars there in 1956. In 2015, TCL still uses it as a bus depot.

In 1989, on its wall on avenue Lacassagne, the Cité de la Création painted a three-hundred-metre fresco comprising seven paintings. It traces the history of the tramway from its beginnings to the present day. (Note: A painting of the Pins depot fresco is illustrated in the Roads and Transportation section. All seven paintings can be viewed online.)

On February 29, 1896, the CTL opened the Pont-Lafayette-RG - Montchat line, which became OTL line no. 25. The tracks are metric. Trailer trains are hauled by Lamm and Francq steam locomotives. In the neighborhood, it runs along chemin des Pins (now avenue Lacassagne), Place Henri, cours Henri (now Docteur-Long) and ends at the corner of cours Richard-Vitton.

Its depot, at the corner of rue Bara and chemin Feuillat, touches the western boundary of Montchat.

==== Railways ====
On October 30, 1881, the Villeurbanne train station opened. It is located near Place Ronde. It was a station of the Chemin de fer de l'Est de Lyon (CFEL), linking the Gare de Lyon-Est with the Gare d'Aoste-Saint-Genix. Transport is mixed (goods and passengers), but in reality involves few passengers. The line closed for good in 2003.

==== 20th century ====
In the 20th century, Montchat continued to develop. This was marked by a focus on transportation. This accessibility encouraged population growth, which in turn generated it. At the same time, housing grew. It was necessary to continue building schools. Places of worship multiplied. Community life was born.

During the Second World War, the neighborhood suffered under the Occupation. The Resistance organizes and acts of violence are committed against it.

== Policy and administration ==
Montchat, like all neighborhoods, is not an administrative structure.

Since 2002, it has had a district council called Montchat, whose boundaries extend over part of the Grange Blanche district. This refers to Lyon's 3rd arrondissement, which is headed by a mayor. This arrondissement is part of the commune of Lyon, whose local authority is the Metropole de Lyon.

The boundaries of the Lyon-XIIIN 36 canton, created in 2000, almost overlap with those of the Montchat district, which means that election results can be transposed as those of the district. For example, in the 2008 cantonal elections, Montchat gave 58.52% of its votes to Najat Vallaud-Belkacem (PS). In the 2012 legislative elections, the district gave Dominique Nachury (UMP) 53.3% of the vote, which contributed to her election. But in 2017 she was defeated by Anne Brugnera (LREM), who won with 60.55% of the votes cast in Lyon's 4th constituency, of which Montchat is a part.

In the 2020 municipal elections in Lyon, the results showed a triangular second round, with the following results: "Ensemble, l'écologie pour Lyon" list (merger of "Maintenant Lyon pour tous les écologistes" - EELV -, "Vivons vraiment Lyon - La Gauche unie" - PS-PP-ND-PCF-G. s - and "Lyon en commun" - LFI -) led by Grégory Doucet: 45.11%, the "Lyon, la force du rassemblement" list (merger of "Bleu Blanc Lyon" - LR-UDI - and "Un temps d'avance" - LREM-MoDem -) led by Béatrice de Montille: 33.55% and the "Respirations" list - dissident LREM - led by Georges Képénékian: 21.34%, with 61.18% abstaining. Grégory Doucet (EELV), who won 49.95% of the vote in Lyon's 3rd arrondissement, became mayor. Following the election, he became mayor of Lyon with 52.4% of the vote, thus changing his political color from centrist.

Population pyramid 2020 Montchat
%	Males	Age	Females	%
17.75		75+		15.63
25.68		60–74		24.27
21.42		45–59		21.21
17.64		30–44		17.54
12.13		15–29		12.39
5.38		0–14		8.96

== Population and society ==
=== Demographics ===
The district's inhabitants are known as the Monchatois.

Initially settled in the countryside, where "urban development continued, but agriculture was still very much alive ", the population of Montchat proliferated. In 1856, for example, there were 654 inhabitants in 73 houses, and in 1896, forty years later, there were 3,573 inhabitants in 855 houses. In 1894, Montchat was designated a "suburb of Lyon". Today, the district is located in Lyon's third arrondissement. In 2013, the total municipal population of this arrondissement was 98,956.

According to the "îlots regroupés pour l'information statistique" (IRIS) used by Insee, it is possible to analyze the population of the neighborhood. (Note: The Montchat district can be superimposed on the IRIS blocks selected by Insee: half of Genas CFEL (IRIS code: 0701), two-thirds of Jules Verne - Acacias (IRIS code: 0702), all of Montchat - Bonnand (IRIS code: 0703), Richard Vitton - Docteur Long (IRIS code: 0901) and Chambovet - Pinel (IRIS code: 0902).) In 2013, the estimated total population was 14,320.

Today, based on the above data, the neighborhood has 22 times more inhabitants than in 1856. This population is both largely settled and ageing. (Note: This remark is not the result of a statistical analysis of the data presented. It is strictly indicative.) The proportion of people over 60 (18.94%), although lower than the national figure (23.6%), is still higher than in Lyon (18.54%). In proportions identical to the national and Lyon breakdowns, the male population of the district (46.87%) is lower than the female population (53.13%).

Population pyramid 2020 Lyon
%	Males	Age	Females	%
15.18		75+		14.12
26.92		60–74		29.45
21.43		45–59		20.17
15.09		30–44		15.00
15.90		15–29		11.85
5.47		0–14		9.41

=== Education ===
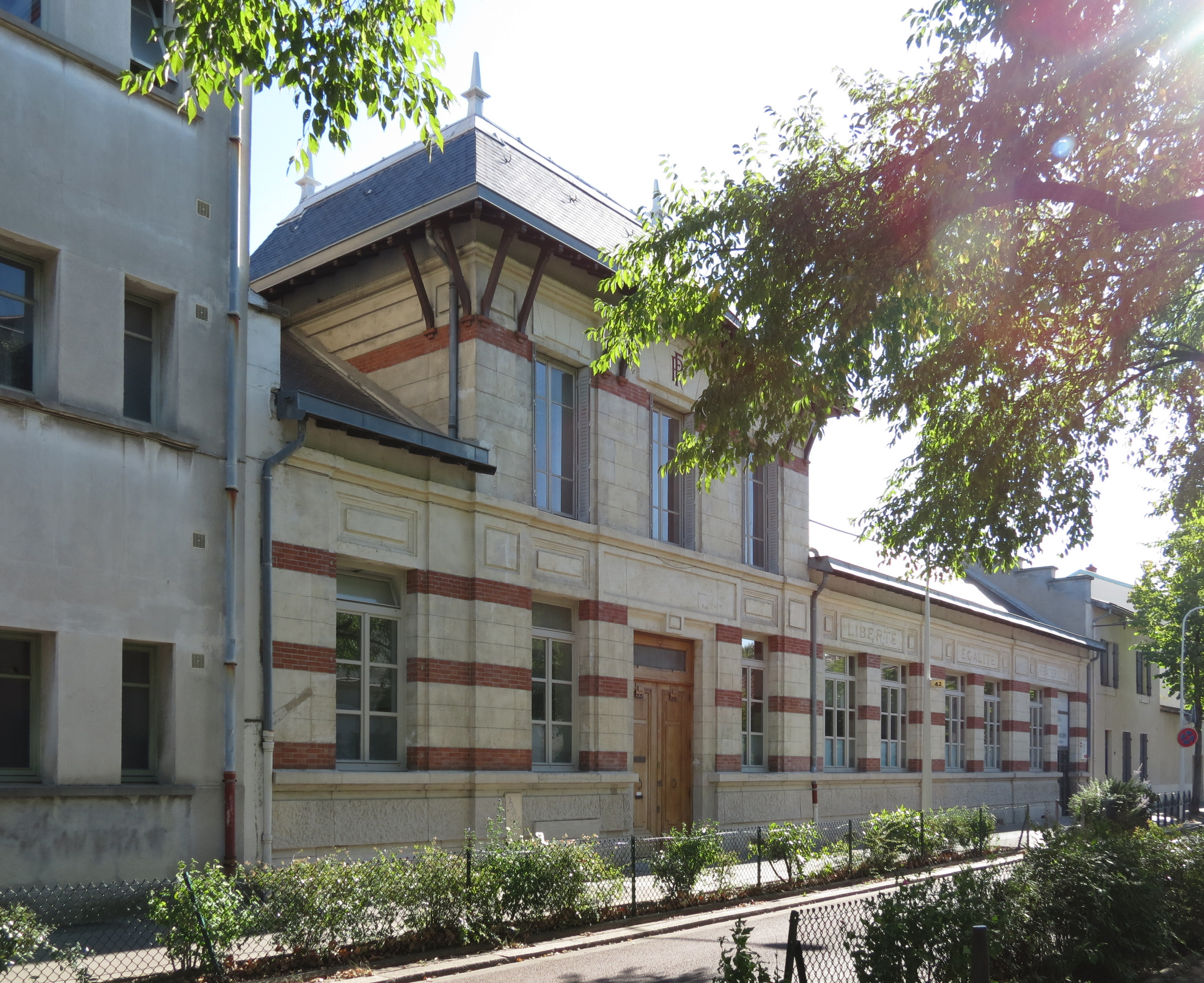
Annexe du collège Molière (2015).

Since 1898, several public facilities have been built.

In 1898, on a fairly central site, the Montchat school complex (now the Collège Molière) was built by architect F. Comte at no. 31 avenue du Château. When it opened, it housed pupils from both the boys' and girls' schools, but they remained separate. A new building was added in 2005. (Note: This extension to the Collège Molière was inaugurated on September 19, 2005 by Gilles de Robien) On November 15, 2010, its canteen was inaugurated in a pre-existing annex on the other side of the avenue at no. 42. In 1912, the Montchat nursery school was built to replace the old nursery school, on the corner of rue Louise and cours Henri (now cours Docteur-Long). (Note: The school was inaugurated on January 21, 1912 by Édouard Herriot.) Subsequent construction work integrated this building with the Collège Moliére.

In 1913, to the north, the rue Louis school complex was inaugurated (Note: This school complex was inaugurated on April 20, 1913 by Édouard Herriot under the presidency of the Rhône prefect) (now the Anatole-France school complex). In 2014, it includes a nursery school at 15, rue Louis and an elementary school at 26, rue Antoinette.

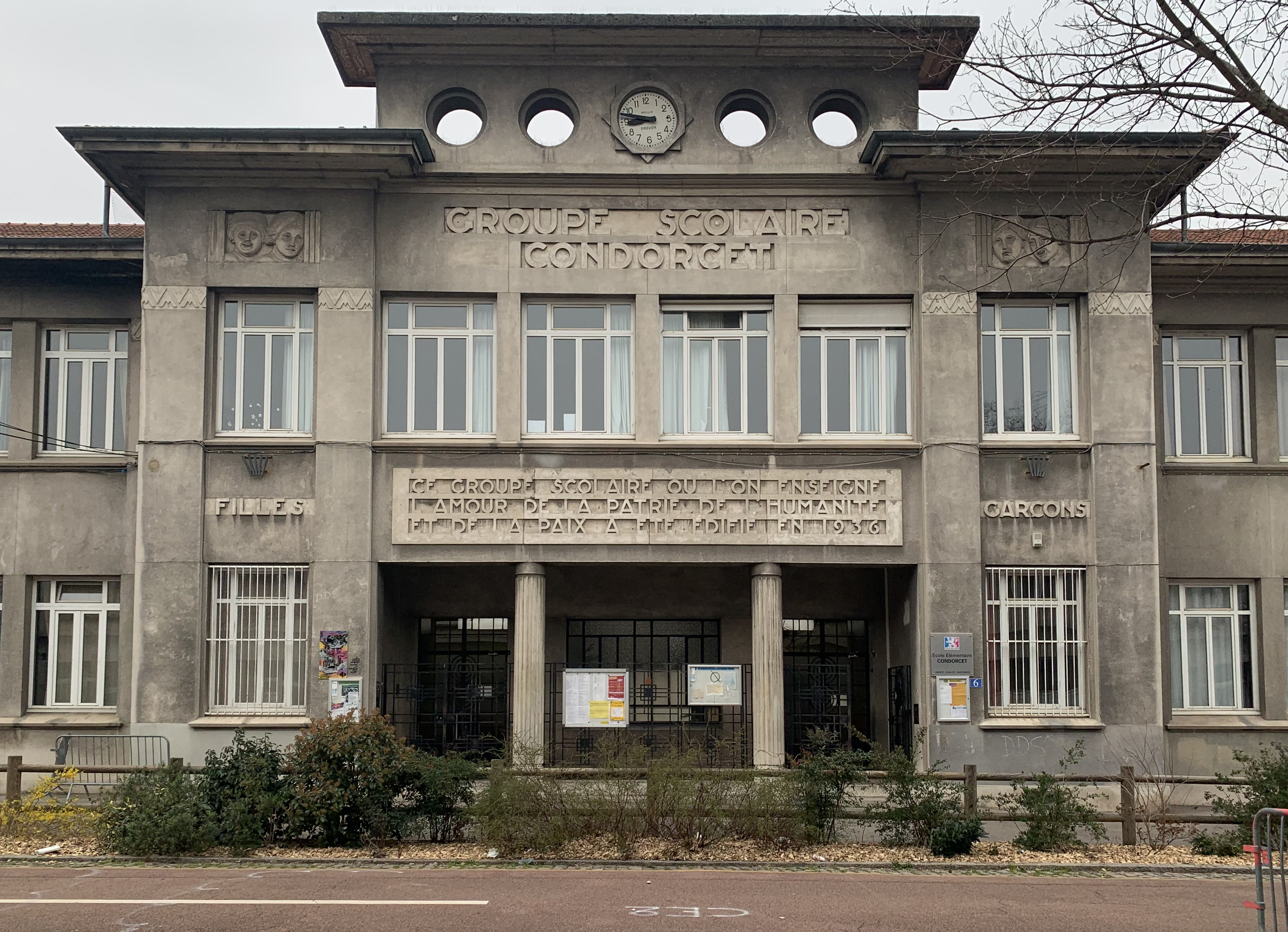
Facade of the Condorcet school on rue Alfred-de-Musset.

In 1913, to the north, the rue Louis school complex was inaugurated (now the Anatole-France school complex). In 2014, it included a nursery school at 15 rue Louis and an elementary school at 26 rue Antoinette.

In 1934, at the southwest corner, the Jules-Verne school was built at 13, rue Jules-Verne. In 2014, it includes a kindergarten and an elementary school.

In 1931, the decision was made to build the Charmilles school complex (now the Condorcet school complex) to the east. Architect Conchon designed the building from 1936 to 1937 at 6, rue Alfred-de-Musset. The two-story building is located on either side of the street. When it opened, the school had twenty-one classes, divided into a nursery school and an elementary school141. In 2013, the school admitted sixteen classes, all at the same level. Some of these classes are bilingual and use French sign language (LSF).

In the 1960s, the Louise Elementary School was opened at 16 rue Louise. It is located near the corner of the Collège Molière, thus forming an almost unbroken unit.

=== Mail ===
Another public service was needed in the neighborhood. In 1896, a request was made to open an auxiliary post office. Later, a second one was opened143. On October 1, 1910 the Post and Telegraph Administration decided to open a fully-fledged office on Cours Henri - the mayor of Lyon still sometimes uses the term "agglomeration". In 2017, this post office, at 3 cours Eugénie, still bears witness to the district's dynamism.

=== Cultural events and festivities ===
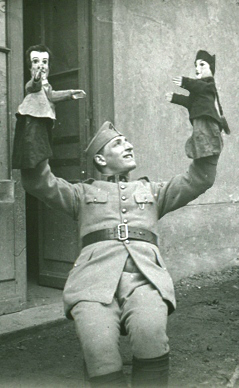
Georges Bazin (Note: Georges Bazin was "a carpentry contractor and a driving force in the Montchat district. Born and died in Lyon 3e, (November 16, 1906-December 1, 1980)".) as a comedian animates Guignol and Gnafron (plaque 1927). (Note: In 1924, the first performers of Guignol de Montchat were: Stéphane Vessot for Guignol, Lucien Montet for Gnafron, Paul Turlin for Madelon, Georges Bazin and Maurice Turlin for the other characters.)

==== Guignol ====
In 1924, the Guignol de Montchat troupe was created. For several years, Guignol and his companions performed at the Montchat patronage. The latter no longer performs these functions, but Guignol's performances are still held in the neighborhood, notably at festivals. (Note: In 1924, the first performers of Guignol de Montchat were : Stéphane Vessot for Guignol, Lucien Montet for Gnafron, Paul Turlin for Madelon, Georges Bazin and Maurice Turlin for the other characters.)

==== Festivals ====
In 1958, to celebrate Montchat's centenary, Georges Bazin (Note: Georges Bazin was a "carpentry contractor" and the driving force behind the Montchat district. Born and died in Lyon 3e, (November 16, 1906-December 1, 1980)) set up an association to organize the neighborhood's festivities during the three days of Ascension Day. These are run by volunteers and supported by local associations. On these occasions, aid is collected - initially in the form of coal, now in the form of money - to be redistributed to the elderly. The mythical cat and mascot of the festivities, Minet, is seated on his throne at all the annual parades.

The Montchat en fête association organizes other events, such as participation in Lyon's traditional Fête des Lumières, a garage sale, the Yggdrasil poetry festival to showcase the Parc Chambovet and many others.

=== Neighborhood house ===
In 1909, architect A. Petit built the conference room at 31, avenue du Château. It later became part of the adjoining Collège Molière. Although the main entrance is walled in, its name still occupies the entire width of the façade. Then, on February 23, 1938, the Foyer Notre-Dame - which later became the Foyer - was inaugurated, designed by Pierre Labrosse, at no. 53 rue Charles-Richard. In 1958, to mark the centenary of Montchat, a commemorative plaque was placed on its west wall in tribute to Jean Louis François Richard-Vitton and his role in the urbanization of the district. In 2013, the renovated community center became the Espace Elsa-Triolet-Montchat. Under the aegis of the Lyon municipality, it houses Le Foyer Montchat (concert hall), La Maison des associations and La Maison des jeunes et de la culture de Montchat (MJC espace Montchat).

=== Sports ===
Numerous sports associations are based in the district. Among the facilities, at no. 3 rue Jules-Verne, the Marc-Vivien Foé municipal stadium - Jules Verne until November 12, 2003 - is the most extensive. It includes two cement basketball or volleyball courts, an athletics track and two soccer pitches for teams of eleven or nine players. However, due to their synthetic surface, they do not belong to the green spaces. The pitches are used by the AS de Montchat Lyon, which dates back to May 1968. The club's 900 members are the largest in the Rhône-Alpes soccer league.

=== Cults ===
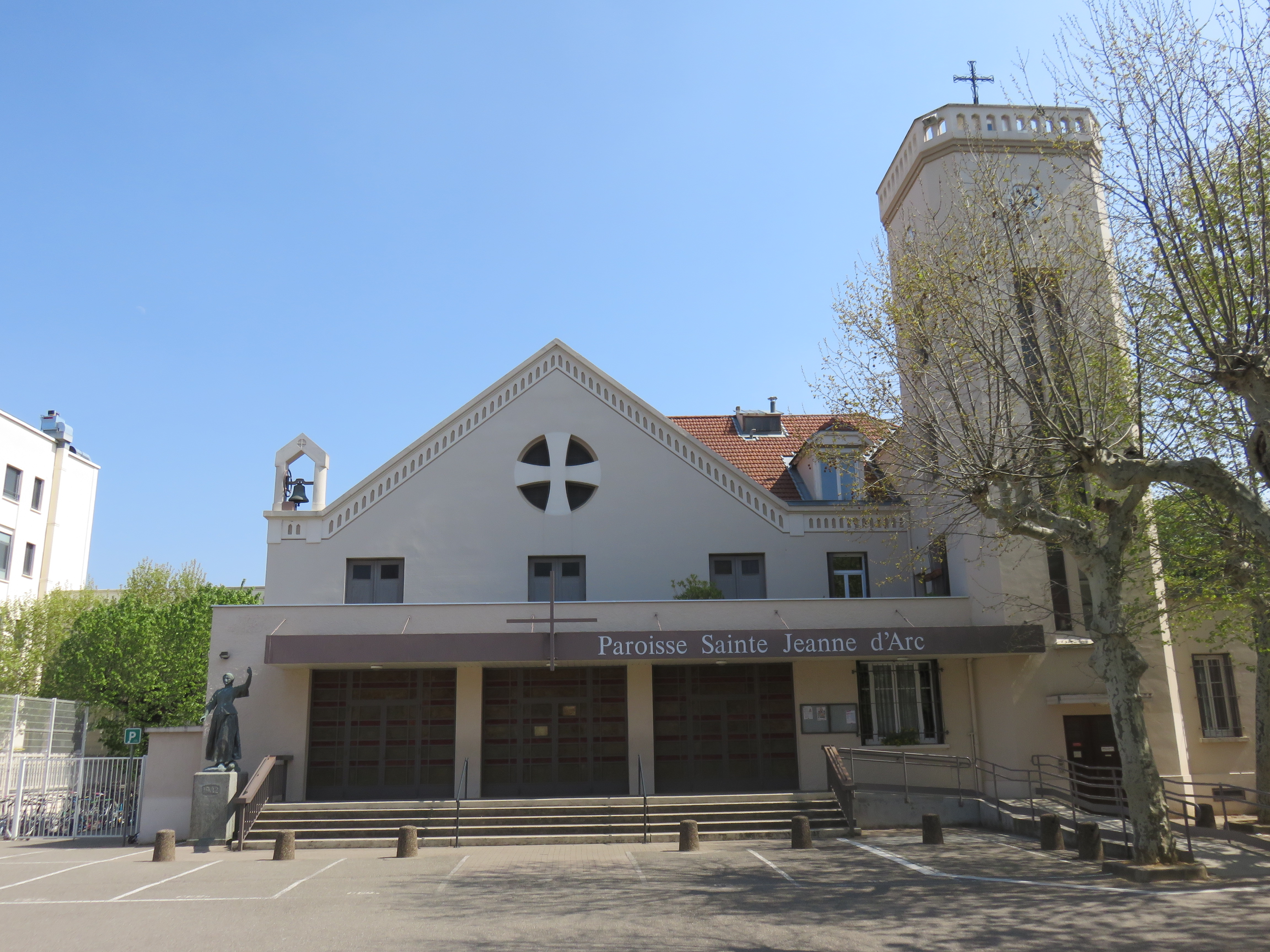
Sainte-Jeanne d'Arc church, in 2019.

Because of the population growth, Roman Catholic worship could no longer be provided in the only church, Notre-Dame-du-bon-Secours, which dates back to 1875. So, in 1933, a 1901 association called Les Amis de Sainte-Jeanne d'Arc set up a temporary chapel (blessed on September 30, 1934) at 15, rue Jeanne-d'Arc. In April 1936, a church was built at 19 rue Jeanne-d'Arc (blessed on March 7, 1937), with a presbytery and a workhouse. The building, whose "stained-glass windows come from the former chapel of the Jesuit college on rue de Séze", (Note: The former Jesuit college on rue de Séze is now the town hall of Lyon's 6th arrondissement.) is dominated by a 20-meter octagonal tower. On October 2, 1938, a mass for the sick was broadcast from this church for the first time. In 1997, it was enlarged.

Protestant worship is also present. In 1931, the Reformed Church of Lyon built La Maisonnette at the end of the impasse Jules Massenet. This wooden temple burned down at the end of February 1956. In 1946, it built a temple at 18, rue Constant. In 2008, the premises proved no longer suitable and were vacated in favor of the brand-new Centre paroissial de la soie to the east of Lyon. The land was given over to an apartment building. In the 1960s, the Evangelical Free Church of Lyon founded a temple at 49, rue Louis.

In February 2002, the Beth Moche (La maison de Moïse) Israelite Cultural Association of Montchat was created to ensure Jewish worship, in a small space at no. 5 rue Saint-Isidore. Then on September 28, 2008, a synagogue was inaugurated at 22, cours du Docteur-Long.

== Economy ==
In 2015, the median tax income per household was €29,500. By way of illustration, the median for Lyon is €23,040164 and the median for metropolitan France is €20,300 per year. For the city, these are residents with a comfortable income. (Note: This remark is not the result of a statistical analysis of the data presented. It is strictly indicative.)

The neighborhood remains residential. Shops are located mainly along the two main thoroughfares, Cours Docteur-Long and Cours Richard-Vitton, as well as on Place du Château - which hosts the market - and Place Ronde.

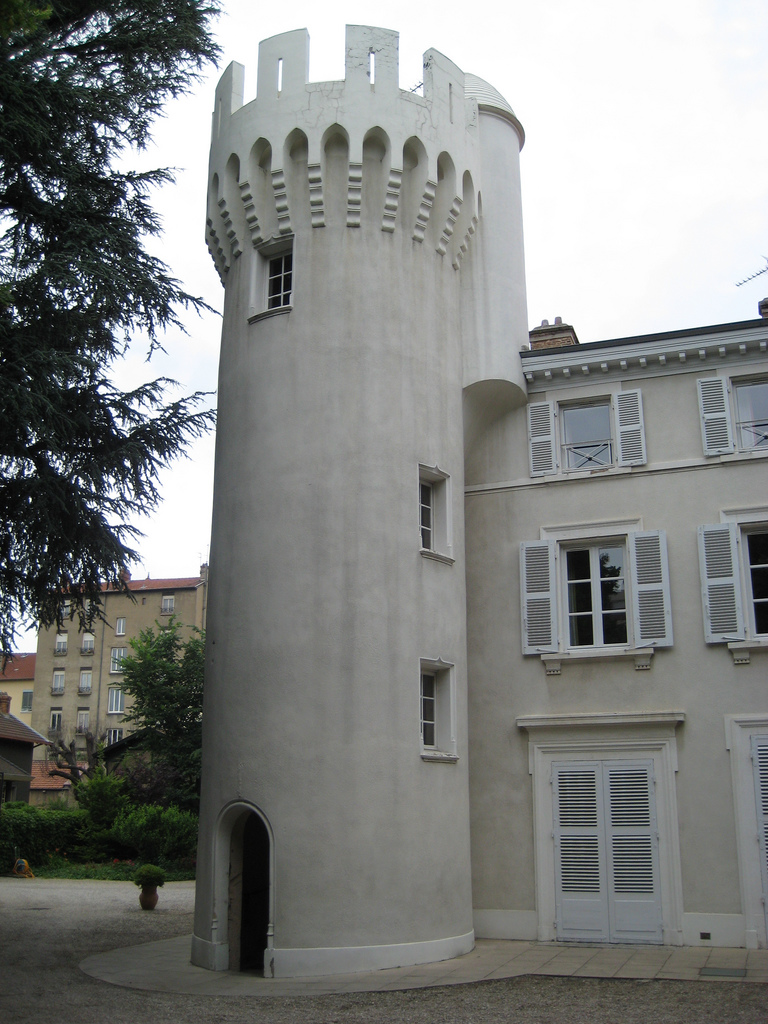
Château de Montchat. Part of the south side and turret. (2008). (Note: Two illustrations describe the Château de Montchat. The first, entitled Le Château de Montchat au début du XIXe siècle, shows two towers, one and a half times the height of the building, each topped by a pepperpot. The second is a postcard showing, adjacent to the south-west corner, a single tower, this time crenelated and topped on the north side by a pepperpot; it is entitled: Le Château de Montchat circa 1900 (current state).)

== Local culture and heritage ==
=== Places and monuments ===
==== Château de Montchat ====
The fortified house of Montchat - improperly named Château de Montchat - is recorded in archives dating back to 1534.

According to the 1858 plan, it is reached "via a tree-lined driveway originating at approximately the intersection of chemin des Pins (avenue Lacassagne) and rue des Feuillants (chemin Saint-Isidore)". "A beautiful chapel, located outside the buildings, was used for [...] religious services".

This is a rectangular, two-storey building with a pitched roof. On the west facade, there are five windows per storey, the higher the storey, the lower the height. A wrought-iron balcony overlooks the triple door on the first floor. The south side features four openings per floor.

The southwest corner is flanked by a crenelated tower. This tower has a pepperpot to its north. A controversial restoration in the 19th century "stripped the tower of its pepperpot and replaced it with crenellations [with machicolations] that are feudal in appearance only ". (Note: Two illustrations describe the Château de Montchat. The first, entitled Le Château de Montchat au début du XIXe siècle, shows two towers, one and a half times the height of the building, each topped by a pepperpot. The second is a postcard showing, adjacent to the south-west corner, a single tower, this time crenelated and topped on the north side by a pepperpot; it is entitled: Le Château de Montchat circa 1900 (current state).)

In 1980, the interior housed twenty-seven rooms, with a twenty-two-meter gallery featuring four arched vaults.

In 1993, the layout of the rooms was redesigned, and the three central French windows on the west façade were covered by a veranda. The residence, which no longer offers accommodation, now hosts conferences and receptions in 3,000 m^{2} of greenery. The tower was restored again in 2014,170.

The building was successively owned by the Catherin family, the Lords of Bron, the Basset family, the Reverend Fathers of the Congrégation de Notre-Dame des Feuillants, and finally the Besson family, from which the Bonands, Vittons, and Richards descended, before being sold in April 1920 to the Bernard (Note: In his book, Georges Bazin gives the first names, surnames and titles of all the successive occupants of this stronghold house, as well as the date of each sale.) family, industrialists specialized in automotive parts. In 1993, Louis Martinod, grandson of the original Bernard purchasers, turned the house into a meeting place.

==== Park Chambovet ====
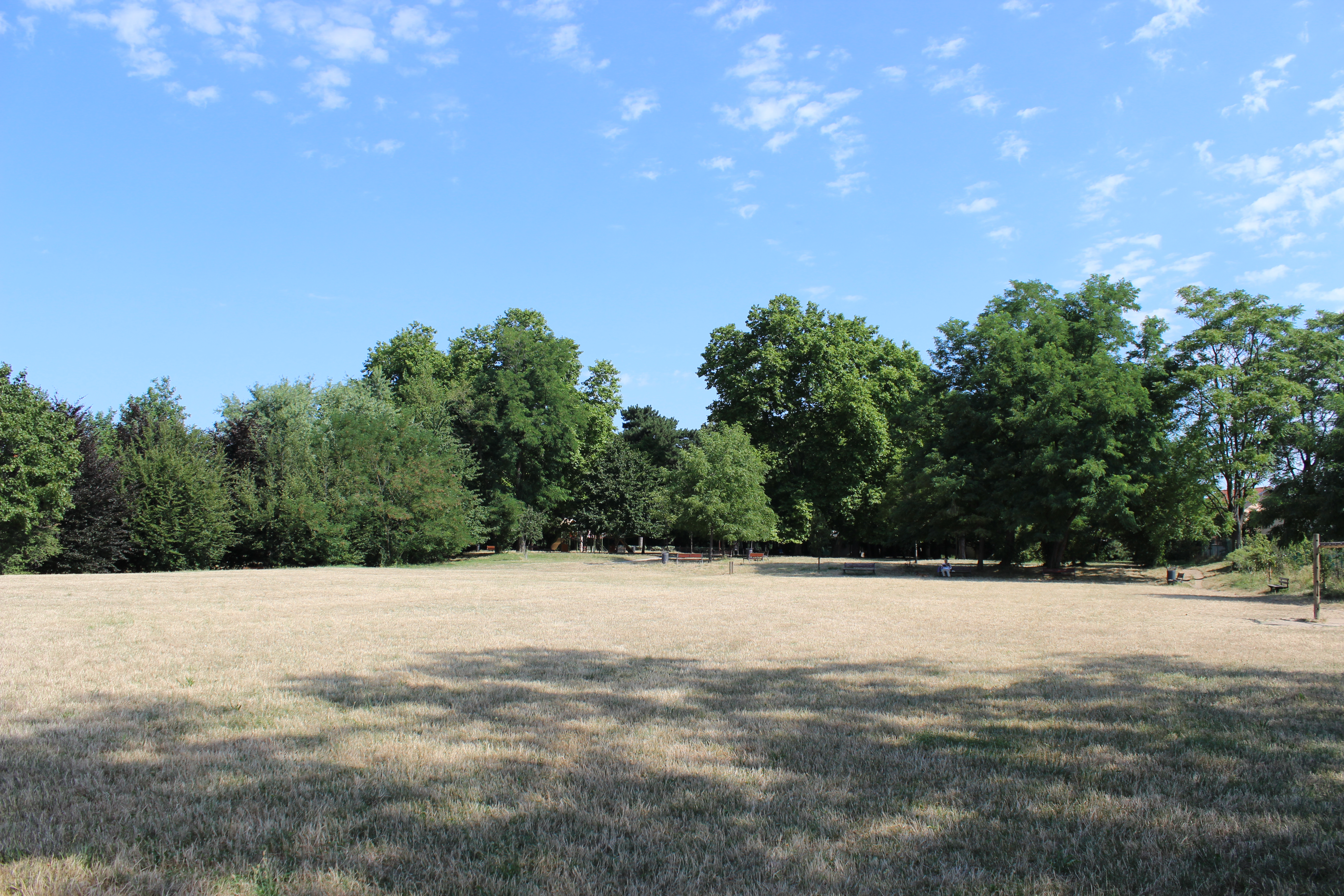
South entrance to Chambovet Park. 2015.

Parc Chambovet is bordered to the northeast by rue Chambovet, from which it takes its name. Located on the heights of Montchat, it offers a view of the city, the Notre-Dame de Fourvière Basilica, and the Monts du Lyonnais. The five-hectare site includes a four-hectare municipal park and allotments. As part of Greater Lyon's urban ecology charter, according to a list updated in 1998, it is listed among the sites belonging to the Lyon metropolitan area's ecological heritage. As an urban and periurban park, it is one of seven intra-mural ecological sites.

The sixty-five allotment gardens of around 200 m^{2}, in existence since 1926, were initially intended to supplement the resources of their beneficiaries and their families, to the exclusion of any commercial use. In the 2000s, "the allotment gardens were seen as a place for vegetable production, but they also became places for leisure, education, meetings and exchanges" under the aegis of the Espaces verts de Lyon. (Note: These allotments can be seen on Wikimedia Commons.)

Originally part of Lyon's countryside, the essential feature of this urban park is its rural aspect, combining meadows and woodland.

In 1940, this green space was the garden of a bourgeois house at 4, rue Chambovet. (Note: The coordinates of René Tavernier's home are, according to the IGN maps) It belonged to the writer René Tavernier. This resistance fighter created the underground newspaper Confluences under the German occupation. As such, he welcomed many intellectuals to this multi-faceted place. From December 31, 1941, to July 1, 1943, Louis Aragon and Elsa Triolet stayed there under the names of Lucien and Elisabeth Andrieux. They formed a resistance movement in the southern zone, the Comité des écrivains. (Note: In September 1943, the two writers' committees, one in the North and the other in the South, symbolically united under the name Comité national des écrivains (CNE).) Director Bertrand Tavernier, René's son, recalls Aragon: "This is where he wrote Il n'y a pas d'amour heureux, which he dedicated to my mother. The original is in our possession. After the war, he remade an original, because, according to my mother, the fact that he had dedicated the poem to her had provoked a domestic scene between him and Elsa Triolet... Is this a legend or the truth?". At her request, a commemorative plaque recounting these events, unveiled by Michel Noir, Mayor of Lyon, was affixed in April 1993 to the address of the house then demolished by the Hospices civils de Lyon (HCL). (Note: This commemorative plaque can be seen on Wikimedia Commons.) On the other side of what is now the eastern entrance to Parc Chambovet, a plaque was affixed on March 9, 2019, also recalling the presence of Elsa Triolet.

In 1950, the commune acquired the land and planned to build a high school on it, but turned it into a municipal park. In 1960, the Hospices civils de Lyon bought the land to build a hospital, but abandoned the project, only to bring it up again in the early 1990s. The Parc Chambovet association, set up in January 1993, met with the town hall's approval, which in 1994 classified the site as a green zone that could not be built on. In 1998, the commune signed a lease with the HCL, which sold the park back to the commune in 2012.

Since 1997, Les Courses pédestres has brought together around two hundred people, from youngsters to adults, on a Sunday morning in early spring. In addition, Un dimanche à la campagne is a family festival held on the third weekend in September. An afternoon of picnics and children's attractions. Over a thousand people are welcomed.

==== Sculptures by Émile Peynot ====
In 1880, the municipality chose the sculptor Émile Peynot to create a representation of the Republic to mark the centenary of 1789. In collaboration with architect Victor-Auguste Blavette, he created a bronze depicting her perched on a fifteen-meter-high column. At the foot of this elevation are four stone statuary groups, representing Liberty, Equality, Fraternity and the City of Lyon. The latter, supported by the Rhône and Saône rivers, leads the Republic. The work was placed in Place Carnot, before being dismantled in January 1975 during the construction of metro line A. The first three large-scale representationsN 52 were placed in 1976 in the northeastern part of the three-hectare Parc de l'Est created in 1975- the park, located on a gravel pit (Note: "Due to the geological nature of the subsoil, there are numerous gravel pits in the Est Lyonnais region.") filled in 1938, was renamed Parc Bazin in 1986 and extended in 2007. This is how the French motto Liberté, Égalité, Fraternité is represented. From north to east, La Liberté carries the Republican flame in protection, L'Égalité holds two men by the shoulders as they support the charter of human rights, and further back, La Fraternité watches over two men who help each other. As befits the style of public sculpture at the time, the men's muscles are prominent, their strength perceptible, the drapery heavy. (Note: These three statuary groups can be seen on Wikimedia Commons: Liberty, Equality and Fraternity.)

==== Maison du docteur Long ====
The house at 18, cours du Docteur-Long is a place of remembrance.

Doctor Jean Long was a doctor born in Alby-sur-Chéran on July 24, 1906, and a member of the Le Coq enchainé resistance network from 1941188. In this capacity, "he distributed leaflets and newspapers, formed sabotage teams, carried out military intelligence by spying on factories manufacturing war material, and provided care to resistance fighters". His London correspondent was André Philip. On October 23, 1943, at around 10:30 p.m., he was taken to Montluc, where he was tortured and executed in Feyzin, in the Quatre-Chemins area. (Note: In October 1955, in Feyzin, the name "route Docteur-Jean-Long" was given to the "route de Corbas". A commemorative plaque affixed to Mme Pichot's farm reads: "On October 23, 1943, the body of Doctor Long, an ardent patriot and victim of Nazism, was deposited in this residence.) His remains were found on the ground, bearing the marks of an execution. "On his body was placed a sheet of paper bearing a handwritten inscription in block letters: "Terror against terror. This man pays with his life for the murder of a National. Signature: "Mouvement national anti-terroriste ". This was the first act of its kind perpetrated in Lyon by the Milice, and it caused a stir.

A plaque was affixed on April 23, 1945, reading "Here lived Dr. Jean Long, who on October 23, 1943 was the first victim of militia repression in Montchat. Français, souvenez-vous". The important Montchat thoroughfare where his house was located, Cours Henri, was named Cours du Docteur-Long on October 23, 1945.

==== RVI wasteland ====
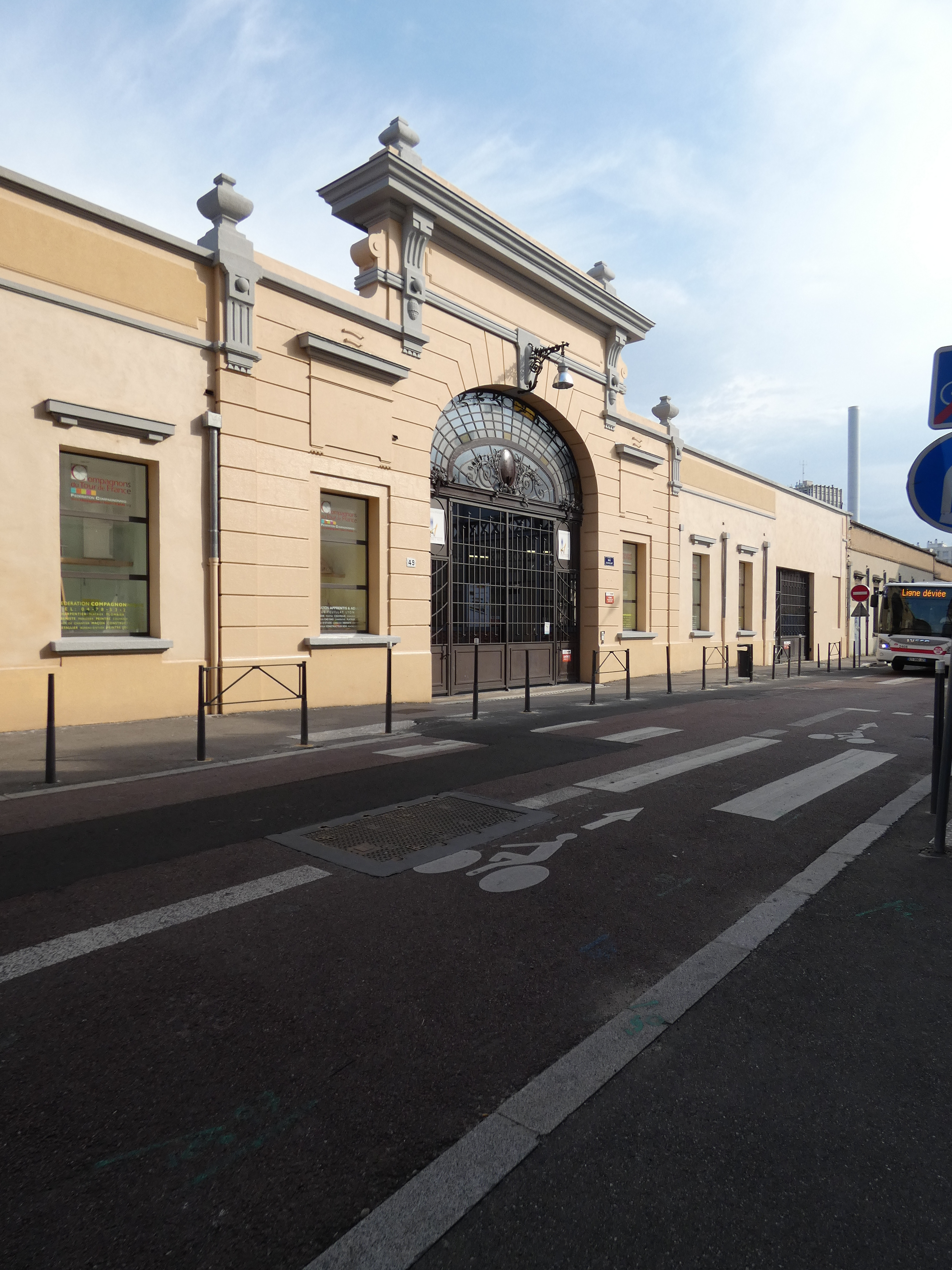
Zenith factory gate, 1913 (photo taken in 2021).

The industrial wasteland left behind by Renault Véhicules Industriels - known as the Friche RVI - is an abandoned vehicle manufacturing site. The 74,262 m^{2} site, in the heart of Lyon, adjoins the southwestern corner of the Montchat district. Rectangular in shape, it faces Cours Albert-Thomas, 510 m rue Feuillat, 179 m avenue Lacassagne and 390 m rue Professeur-Rochaix. (Note: The coordinates of Friche RVI are: 45° 44′ 57″ N, 4° 52′ 38″ E.)

In 1899, this was the site chosen by Édouard Rochet and Théodore Schneider for the first provincial car manufacturing plant - the Rochet-Schneider company. In 1909, the company set up a subsidiary here, which became the leading carburetor manufacturer of the first half of the 20th century, Société du carburateur Zénith. After a number of industrial activities, the site was taken over by Automobiles Marius Berliet in December 1959, which merged with Renault Véhicules Industriels in 1978. The latter turned the site into a spare parts store for heavy goods vehicles, before selling it in 2001. In 2002, it was bought by Greater Lyon.

The Belle Époque factory, designed by architect Louis Payet and completed in 1912, occupies the site. The long façade on Rue Feuillat and the sheds are a reminder of the building's destiny. This façade is marked by a majestic porch dating from the early 20th century, extended by an interior glass roof of the same date. In 2003, the building was awarded the "Patrimoine du XXe siècle" (20th-century heritage) label, and as such receives special attention from the architecte des bâtiments de France.

Grand Lyon gave the site a new vocation. In 2005, it divided the site with the east-west Rue Félix-Rollet. (Note: From September 12, 2005 to April 2, 2012: rue François-Barthelemy-Arles-Dufour) The Société d'Enseignement Professionnel du Rhône (SEPR) campus moved in first in 2005, then expanded in 2013. Occupation by a self-managed artists' collective ended in 2010199. In November 2015, the FCMB (Fédération Compagnonnique des Métiers du Bâtiment) took up residence. Then, in April 2016, the Émile-Cohl school - which teaches drawing - and the Établissement d'enseignement supérieur en art mural (ÉCohlCité) took over. The Marguerite Yourcenar media library, part of the Lyon municipal library network, opened on October 10, 2017. Then the 8,000 m^{2} Zenith (Note: The name Zenith Park - not Zenith Park - refers "to the site's industrial past, since it was on this RVI site that the Zenith carburetor was designed and manufactured for decades".) park was inaugurated on June 20, 2018, followed by the inauguration of a gymnasium, including one accessible to disabled athletes, on October 30, 2018.

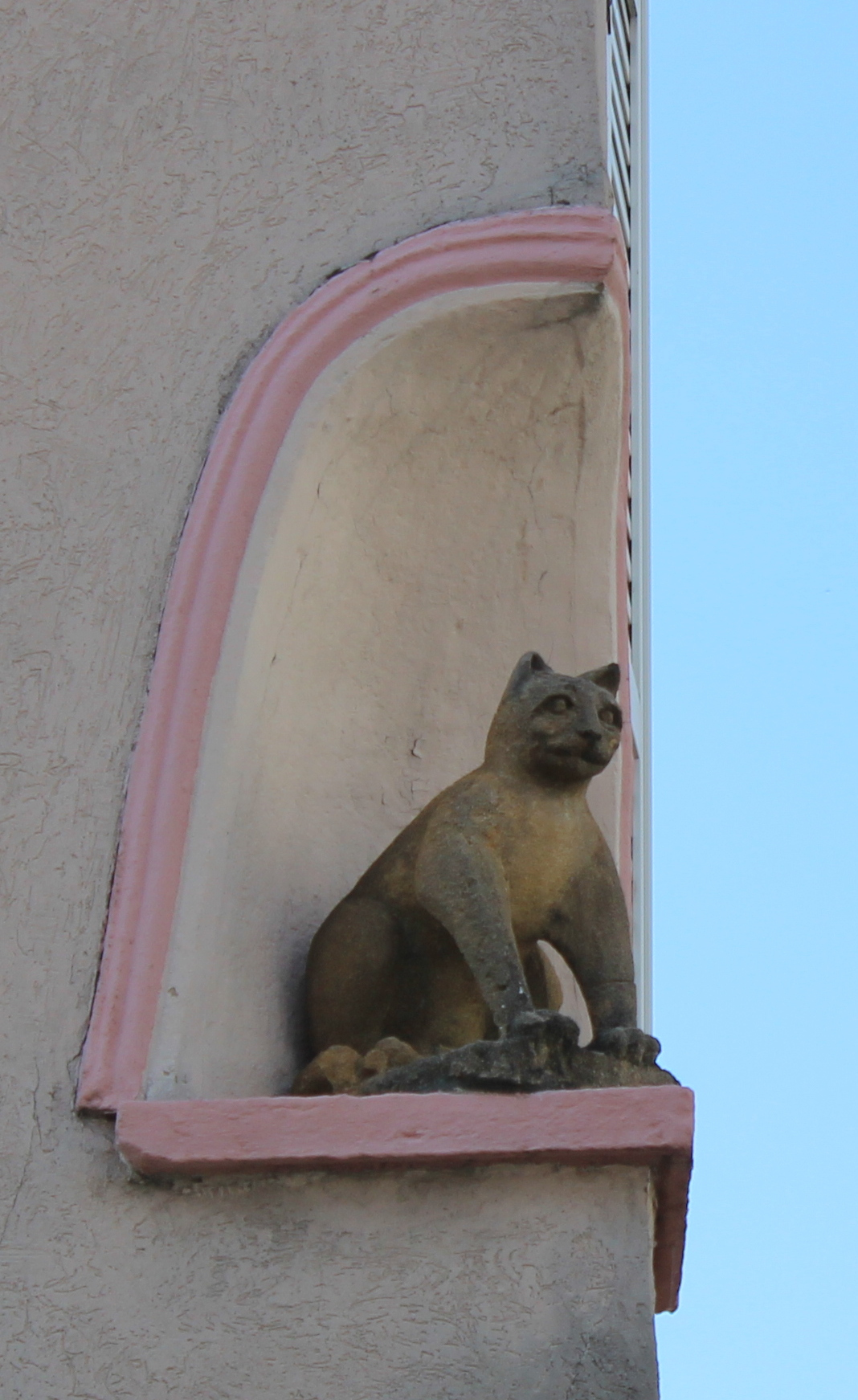
Statue of the Montchat Cat. (Note: The statue of the Chat de Montchat stands at the corner of 3, rue de l'Église and 156, route de Genas.) 2015.

=== The cat ===
==== Order of the Cat ====
On June 26, 1961, Georges Bazin registered the Ordre du Mérite Monchatois with the prefecture, initially to "reward people who have helped the elders of the Montchat district". Now known as the Order of the Cat, it recognizes those involved in the life of the district. He is the first Grand Chancellor and, as such, guardian of the cane on which every inductee must swear loyalty to Montchat. Inductees are not necessarily Montchat residents or natives. A wide range of personalities are among them. Some are nationally famous, such as Raymond Barre or Louis Pradel, others are of more confidential renown, such as Christiane Sibellin (Miss France 1965), or even of purely Lyonnais reputation, or simply benefactors. At the end of the annual Montchat festival, the four inductees take an oath based on the following criteria: "Love of Montchat and Lyon. Total and constant devotion to our neighborhood. Worship of Montchat traditions (friendship, culture, humanism, gastronomy, mutual aid, sporting merit)."

==== The Cat's Misadventures ====
In a niche, at the corner of route de Genas and rue de l'Église, stands a stone statue of the Cat. (Note: The statue of the Chat de Montchat stands at the corner of 3, rue de l'Église and 156, route de Genas. {{coord|45|45|15|N|4|53|29|W}}) At the same crossroads, on the opposite side of the street, also in a niche, the Virgin Mary is represented by a stone statue dated 1863 (Note: This statue of the Virgin Mary can be seen on Wikimedia Commons. It stands at the corner of 2 rue de l'Église and 154 route de Genas.)- a developer is required to replace it in its niche after the building has been remodeled. They both watch over the entrance to Montchat.

The assaults of time removed the feline's head in the 1950s. Montchat medallist Paul Penin210 then produced a stone figure. On March 5, 1998, thieves took advantage of scaffolding for repair work to unseal and carry off the emblem. Fortunately, two weeks later, the statue was found in a rubbish dump in relatively good condition. It was then replaced.

=== Local personalities ===
- René-Maurice Gattefossé (1881-1950), born in Montchat, a forerunner in aromatherapy whose establishment is currently based in Montchat.
- Elsa Triolet (1896-1970) and Louis Aragon (1897-1982), poets and novelists, founded the Comité national des écrivains in Montchat during the Occupation.
- Jean Reverzy (1914-1959), a Montchat-based doctor and writer, who won the Prix Renaudot in 1954 for his novel Le Passage.
- René Tavernier (1915-1989), writer and journalist who moved to the Montchat district during the Occupation, and publisher of the free literary magazine Confluences.
- Najat Vallaud-Belkacem (1977), politician, general councillor for the Lyon-XIII canton (mainly Montchat) from 2008 to 2014.

== See also ==
- Lyon
- List of streets and squares in Lyon

== Bibliography ==
- Jacquemont, Eugène (1912). Relation des séjours de Christine de Suède à Lyon (1656 à 1658) : avec pièces justificatives et comptabilité de l'entrée et des séjours de la Reine tirées des Archives municipales. Revue d'histoire de Lyon: études et documents, bibliographie.
- Bazin, Georges (1956). Montchat - Lyon 3e : un ancien lieu-dit de la rive gauche du Rhône, Saint-Étienne. Imprimerie Le Hennaf.
- de La Valette, Robert Brun (1969). Lyon et ses rues. Éditions du Fleuve.
- Long, Guetty; Chauvy, Gérard (2003). Montchat : regards sur l'histoire d'un quartier lyonnais: des origines à nos jours. Bellier. ISBN 2-84631-078-5.
- Barbarino-Saulnier, Natalia; Scherrer, Franck (2005). De la qualité de vie au diagnostic urbain, vers une nouvelle méthode d'évaluation: Le cas de la ville de lyon.
- Vanario, Maurice; Hours, Henri (2002). Rues de Lyon: à travers les siècles (2 ed.). Lyon: Éditions Lyonnaises d'art et d'histoire. ISBN 2-84147-126-8.

=== Other sources ===
==== Urban development plan for Greater Lyon, Lyon metropolis, 2005-2016 ====
- Métropole de Lyon (2005). "Des premières implantations humaines à l'agglomération lyonnaise contemporaine". Documents généraux (hors Givors – Grigny – Lissieu): Rapport de présentation (PDF). Vol. 1: Diagnostic et enjeux du territoire. Plan local d'urbanisme. Métropole de Lyon.
- Métropole de Lyon. "Une géographie contrastée, fondement de la richesse des paysages et cadre pour la ville. Relief, géologie et cours d'eau…". Documents généraux (hors Givors – Grigny – Lissieu): Rapport de présentation (PDF). Vol. 1.
- Métropole de Lyon. "Une géographie contrastée, fondement de la richesse des paysages et cadre pour la ville. La trame verte". Documents généraux (hors Givors – Grigny – Lissieu): Rapport de présentation (PDF). Vol. 1. Plan local d'urbanisme.
- Métropole de Lyon (2009). Documents de la commune Lyon: PPRN. Inondations Rhône. Centre (plan) (PDF). Plan local d'urbanisme. Métropole de Lyon.
- Métropole de Lyon (2015). "Périmètre d'intérêt patrimonial". Cahier communal:Rapport de présentation. Projet d'aménagement et de développement durable. Orientations d'aménagement (PDF). Plan local d'urbanisme. Modification n° 11. Métropole de Lyon.
