= Françoise Hardy discography =

- Studio albums: 32
- Compilation albums: 29
- Singles: 116

This is the discography of French singer Françoise Hardy.

== Albums ==
=== Studio albums ===
Title	Album details	Peak chart positions						
Title	Album details	FRA	BEL (FL)	BEL (WA)	GER	QUE	SPA	SWI
Tous les garçons et les filles	Released: November 1962; Label: Vogue	25	—	—	40 (Note: Chart position is from 1964.)	—	—	—
Le premier bonheur du jour	Released: October 1963; Label: Vogue	40	—	—	23	—	—	—
Françoise Hardy canta per voi in italiano	Released: November 1963; Label: Vogue; Italy-only release	40	—	—	—	—	—	—
Mon amie la rose	Released: November 1964; Label: Vogue	40	—	—	23	—	—	—
In Deutschland	Released: September 1965; Label: Vogue/Bellaphon; Germany-only release	—	—	—	21	—	—	—
L'amitié	Released: October 1965; Label: Vogue	—	—	—	24	5 (Note: Chart position is from 1969.)	—	—
Françoise Hardy Sings in English	Released: May 1966; Label: Vogue	—	—	—	—	—	—	—
La maison où j'ai grandi	Released: November 1966; Label: Vogue	—	—	—	—	7	—	—
Ma jeunesse fout le camp...	Released: November 1967; Label: Vogue	4	—	—	—	—	—	—
En anglais	Released: November 1968; Label: Vogue	173 (Note: Chart position is from 2016.)	—	—	—	—	—	—
Comment te dire adieu	Released: December 1968; Label: Vogue	2	—	—	—	—	—	—
One-Nine-Seven-Zero	Released: October 1969; Label: United Artists	—	—	—	—	—	—	—
Träume	Released: January 1970; Label: Vogue; Germany-only release	—	—	—	—	—	—	—
Soleil	Released: October 1970; Label: Sonopresse	9	—	—	—	—	—	—
La question	Released: 16 October 1971; Label: Sonopresse	—	—	—	—	—	—	—
If You Listen	Released: December 1971; Label: MvN, Kundalini; Originally released as 4th English Album	—	—	—	—	—	—	—
Et si je m'en vais avant toi	Released: November 1972; Label: Sonopresse	—	—	—	—	—	—	—
Message personnel	Released: November 1973; Label: Warner Bros.	105 (Note: Chart position is from 2013.)	—	129	—	—	—	—
Entr'acte	Released: November 1974; Label: Warner Bros.	14	—	—	—	—	—	—
Star	Released: May 1977; Label: Pathé	—	—	—	—	—	—	—
Musique saoule	Released: October 1978; Label: Pathé	—	—	—	—	—	—	—
Gin tonic	Released: March 1980; Label: Flarenasch	20	—	—	—	—	—	—
À suivre...	Released: 1981; Label: Flarenasch	—	—	—	—	—	—	—
Quelqu'un qui s'en va	Released: 1982; Label: Flarenasch	—	—	—	—	—	—	—
Décalages (Note: Title track is based on "Waiting For The Right Time" by Les Holroyd of UK prog-rock group Barclay James Harvest, with lyrics rewritten by Hardy.)	Released: 2 May 1988; Label: Flarenasch	29	—	—	—	—	—	—
Le danger	Released: 22 April 1996; Label: Virgin	—	—	40	—	39	—	—
Clair-obscur	Released: 3 May 2000; Label: Virgin	2	—	15	—	—	—	89
Tant de belles choses	Released: 16 November 2004; Label: Virgin	7	90	17	67	48	—	62
(Parenthèses...)	Released: 27 November 2006; Label: Virgin/EMI	7	—	7	—	—	—	56
La pluie sans parapluie	Released: 22 March 2010; Label: Virgin/EMI	5	41	4	—	26	—	30
L'amour fou	Released: 5 November 2012; Label: Virgin	5	157	8	—	63	—	57
Personne d'autre	Released: 6 April 2018; Label: Parlophone	4	46	2	—	—	99	11
"—" denotes releases that did not chart or were not released in that territory.

=== Compilation albums ===
Title	Album details	Peak chart positions			
Title	Album details	BEL (WA)	GER	JPN	QUE
Portrait in Musik	Released: May 1965; Label: Vogue; Germany and Austria-only release	—	4	—	—
Maid in Paris	Released: October 1965; Label: 4 Corners of the World; US-only release	—	—	—	—
Le palmarès	Released: 1966; Label: Vogue	—	—	—	—
Portrait in Musik	Released: December 1966; Label: Discoton; Split album with Udo Jürgens; Germany-only release	—	9	—	—
Chansons...	Released: 1967; Label: Vogue	—	—	—	17 (Note: Chart position is from 1971.)
Voilà	Released: July 1969; Label: Philips; Germany and Austria-only release	—	22	—	—
Mon amour adieu	Released: July 1969; Label: Reprise; US and Canada-only release	—	—	—	—
Françoise	Released: May 1970; Label: Sonopresse	—	—	—	—
Les grands succès de Françoise Hardy	Released: 1970; Label: Vogue	—	—	—	5
Françoise in Italian	Released: 1970; Label: World Record Co.; South Africa-only release	—	—	—	—
Le double disque d'or de Francoise Hardy	Released: 1977; Label: Vogue	—	—	—	—
Ma jeunesse fout le camp	Released: 1 April 1979; Label: Epic; Japan-only release	—	—	54	—
Les plus belles chansons de Françoise Hardy	Released: 1981; Label: Warner Bros.	—	—	—	—
Love Songs	Released: 1987; Label: WEA	—	—	—	—
The Best of Françoise Hardy	Released: 21 November 1990; Label: Epic; Japan-only release	—	—	89	—
36 grands succès	Released: 1990; Label: Vogue	—	—	—	—
36 grands succès – Volume 2	Released: 1991; Label: Vogue	—	—	—	—
Les années Flarenasch (1980–1990)	Released: 1993; Label: Flarenasch	—	—	—	—
Le meilleur de Françoise Hardy	Released: 1995; Label: Flarenasch	46	—	—	—
Les grands numéros 1	Released: October 1998; Label: Vogue; Canada-only release	—	—	—	39 (Note: Originally peaked at number 42 in 1998, but re-entered the chart in 2003, peaking at number 39.)
Le meilleur de Françoise Hardy	Released: 2000; Label: BMG	—	—	—	—
Messages personnels	Released: 2003; Label: Virgin	28	—	—	—
Le temps des souvenirs	Released: 21 November 2005; Label: Virgin	54	—	—	—
Collection platinum	Released: 2008; Label: EMI	—	—	—	—
La collection 62–66	Released: 2009; Label: Vogue/Legacy; 6xCD box set	—	—	—	—
Best of – 3CD	Released: 3 April 2009; Label: EMI	25	—	—	—
The Real... Françoise Hardy – The Ultimate Collection	Released: 2016; Label: Legacy/Sony Music	186	—	—	—
Le coffret essentiel	Released: 13 October 2017; Label: Parlophone/Warner Music; 10xCD box set	—	—	—	—
Le coffret essentiel – Volume 2	Released: 23 October 2020; Label: Parlophone/Warner Music; 10xCD box set	—	—	—	—
"—" denotes releases that did not chart or were not released in that territory.

== Singles and EPs ==
On the table below, until 1970, in France and Wallonia, the majority of Françoise Hardy's releases were EPs (represented in italics) and many were released as singles in other countries.

=== 1960s ===
Title	Year	Peak chart positions									
Title	Year	FRA	AUS	BEL (WA)	GER	IT	JPN	QUE	SA	SPA	UK
"Tous les garçons et les filles" / "J'suis d'accord" (Note: "Tous les garçons et les filles" and "J'suis d'accord" were released in France on the EP Contact avec Françoise Hardy and the two sides were released as a single.)	1962	1	—	1	20	—	—	1; 11	—	1	36
C'est à l'amour auquel je pense	1962	1	—	7	—	—	—	—	—	10	—
Ton meilleur ami	1962	8	—	13	—	—	—	—	—	—	—
"Peter und Lou" (Note: "Peter und Lou" is a German-language version of "Tous les garçons et les filles".)	1963	—	—	—	20	—	—	—	—	—	—
Quelli della mia età (Note: "Quelli della mia età" is an Italian-language version of "Tous les garçons et les filles".)	1963	—	—	—	—	2	—	—	—	—	—
"L'amour s'en va"	1963	2	—	7	—	—	—	—	—	—	—
Qui aime-t-il vraiment (Note: The title track is a French-language version of "Your Nose Is Gonna Grow" by Johnny Crawford.)	1963	6	—	17	—	—	—	16	—	—	—
Le premier bonheur du jour	1963	2	—	7	—	—	—	19	—	17	—
"L'età dell'amore" (Note: "L'età dell'amore" is an Italian-language version of "Le temps de l'amour".)	1963	—	—	—	—	2	—	—	—	—	—
Le sais-tu ?	1963	24	—	47	—	—	—	—	—	—	—
Chante en anglais (Note: Released in the UK as Françoise Hardy Sings in English)	1964	—	—	—	—	—	—	—	—	—	—
"Catch a Falling Star" / "Only Friends" (Note: This is the single released of the lead track from the EP Chante en anglais.)	1964	—	—	42	—	—	—	—	—	—	—
"L'amore va" (Note: "L'amore va" is an Italian-language version of "L'amour s'en va".)	1964	—	—	—	—	13	—	—	—	—	—
Pourtant tu m'aimes	1964	3	—	16	—	—	—	—	—	—	—
"Il saluto del mattino" (Note: "Il saluto del mattino" is an Italian-language version of "Le premier bonheur du jour".)	1964	—	—	—	—	—	—	—	—	—	—
C'est fab! (Note: C'est fab! and C'est Françoise were only released in the UK and are collections of previously released tracks.)	1964	—	—	—	—	—	—	—	—	—	— (Note: C'est fab! peaked at number 5 on the Record Retailer EP chart.)
"Wer du bist"	1964	—	—	—	32	—	—	—	—	—	—
"La tua mano"	1964	—	—	—	—	—	—	—	—	—	—
Et même	1964	—	—	23	—	—	—	—	—	—	31
C'est Françoise	1964	—	—	—	—	—	—	—	—	—	— (Note: C'est Françoise peaked at number 18 on the Record Retailer EP chart.)
Je n'attends plus personne (Note: The title track is a French-language version of "Non aspetto nessuno" by Little Tony.)	1964	—	—	—	—	—	—	—	—	—	—
Je veux qu'il revienne (Note: The title track is a French-language version of "Only You Can Do It" by the Vernons Girls.)	1964	2	—	6	—	—	—	30	—	—	—
"Mon amie la rose" (Note: "Mon amie la rose" was released as a single from Je veux qu'il revienne in certain countries.)	1964	—	—	—	—	—	—	—	—	—	—
"Frag' den Abendwind"	1965	—	—	—	7	—	—	—	—	—	—
Chante en anglais (Note: Different from the 1963 EP.)	1965	—	—	—	—	—	—	—	—	—	—
"All Over the World" (Note: Taken from the EP Chante en anglais.)	1965	—	—	—	—	—	—	28	—	—	16
Chante en allemand	1965	—	—	—	—	—	—	—	—	—	—
Dit lui non	1965	12	—	9	—	—	—	—	—	—	—
"Devi ritornare" (Note: "Devi ritornare" is the Italian-language version of "Je veux qu'il revienne", originally "Only You Can Do It".)	1965	—	—	—	—	11	—	—	—	—	—
"Only You Can Do It"	1965	—	22	—	—	—	—	29	14	—	—
"Just Call and I'll Be There"	1965	—	83	—	—	—	—	—	—	—	—
Le temps des souvenirs	1965	—	—	23	—	—	—	—	—	—	—
"Ich bin nun mal ein Mädchen" (Note: German-language version of "pourtant tu m’aimes", originally "I Still Love Him".)	1965	—	—	—	24	—	—	—	—	—	—
"So Many Friends" (Note: "So Many Friends" is the English-language version of "L'amitié".)	1965	—	—	—	—	—	—	—	—	—	—
L'amitié	1965	14	—	12	—	—	—	39	—	—	—
Tu peux bien	1966	—	—	45	—	—	—	—	—	—	—
"Parlami di te"	1966	—	—	—	—	12	—	—	—	—	—
La maison où j'ai grandi	1966	6	—	2	—	—	—	10	—	—	—
"Dann bist du verliebt"	1966	—	—	—	39	—	—	—	—	—	—
"This Little Heart" (Note: "This Little Heart" is an English-language version of "Ce petit cœur", originally from Hardy's album L'amitié)	1966	—	—	—	—	—	—	—	—	—	—
"Non svegliarmi mai" (Note: "Non svegliarmi mai" is an Italian-language version of "Non ce n'est pas un rêve", a cover of "Don't Come Any Closer" by Samantha Jones.)	1966	—	—	—	—	—	—	—	—	—	—
"Autumn Rendezvous"	1966	—	—	—	—	—	—	—	—	—	57 (Note: Chart position is from the UK "Breakers List".)
Je changerais d'avis	1966	—	—	10	—	—	—	—	—	—	—
Si c'est ça	1967	—	—	45	—	—	—	—	—	—	—
"Gli altri" / "I sentimenti" (Note: "Gli altri" is an Italian-language version of "Voilà" and "I sentimenti" is likewise of "Et même".)	1967	—	—	—	—	— 11	—	—	—	—	—
Voilà	1967	10	—	9	—	—	—	6	—	—	—
Des ronds dans l'eau	1967	—	—	13	—	—	—	19	—	—	—
"On se quitte toujours"	1967	—	—	—	—	—	—	—	—	—	—
"Now You Want to Be Loved" (Note: "Now You Want To Be Loved" is an English-language version of "Des ronds dans l'eau".)	1968	—	—	—	—	—	—	—	13	—	—
Ma jeunesse fout l'camp	1968	—	—	38	—	—	—	—	—	—	—
Je ne sais pas ce que je veux (Note: The title track is a French-language version of "Tiny Goddess" by Nirvana.)	1968	—	—	26	—	—	—	—	—	—	—
"Will You Love Me Tomorrow"	1968	—	—	—	—	—	—	—	—	—	—
"La bilancia dell'amore" (Note: "La bilancia dell'amore" is an Italian-language version of "Tiny Goddess".)	1968	—	—	—	—	16	—	—	—	—	—
"À quoi ça sert"	1968	—	—	42	—	—	—	—	—	—	—
Comment te dire adieu	1968	4	—	3	—	—	40	4	—	—	—
"Loving You"	1969	—	—	—	—	—	—	15	—	—	—
"Il pretesto" (Note: "Il pretesto" is an Italian-language version of "Comment te dire adieu", itself a cover "It Hurts to Say Goodbye.)	1969	—	—	—	—	—	—	—	—	—	—
Étonnez-moi, Benoît	1969	—	—	23	—	—	—	—	—	—	—
"Souvenirs der ersten großen Liebe"	1969	—	—	—	31	—	—	—	—	—	—
"Des bottes rouges de Russie"	1969	—	—	24	—	—	—	9	—	—	—
"J'ai coupé le téléphone"	1969	—	—	25	—	—	—	4	—	—	—
"Stivali di vernice blu"	1969	—	—	—	—	—	—	—	—	—	—
"—" denotes releases that did not chart or were not released in that territory.

=== 1970s ===
Title	Year	Peak chart positions				
Title	Year	FRA	BEL (WA)	JPN	QUE	SPA
"All Because of You"	1970	—	—	—	—	—
"Die roten Russenstiefel" (Note: "Die roten Russenstiefel" is the German-language version of "Des bottes rouges de Russie".)	1970	—	—	—	—	—
"Soleil"	1970	36	19	—	3	28
"Lungo il mare"	1970	—	—	—	—	—
"Soon Is Slipping Away"	1970	—	—	—	—	—
Le crabe	1970	—	44	—	—	—
"Dame souris trotte" / "Point"	1970	—	18	—	— 30	—
"T'es pas poli" (with Patrick Dewaere)	1971	—	27	—	—	—
"Le martien"	1971	—	—	—	—	—
"La question" / "Même sous la pluie"	1971	—	25	—	—	—
"La mer"	1971	—	—	—	—	—
"Rêve"	1972	—	—	—	—	—
"La berlue"	1972	—	—	—	—	—
"Wenn wilde Schwäne flieh'n"	1973	—	—	—	—	—
"La rencontre"	1973	—	—	—	—	—
"Message personnel"	1973	27	6	—	20	—
"Rêver le nez en l'air"	1974	—	—	—	—	—
"Ich"	1974	—	—	—	—	—
"Je suis moi"	1974	43	26	—	—	—
"Ce soir"	1974	—	38	—	—	—
"Que vas-tu faire?"	1975	50	36	—	—	—
"Femme parmi les femmes"	1976	49	49	—	—	—
"À Vannes"	1977	—	45	—	—	—
"J'écoute de la musique saoule"	1978	21	—	—	—	—
"Ma jeunesse fout le camp" (re-release)	1979	—	—	63	—	—
"—" denotes releases that did not chart or were not released in that territory.

=== 1980s ===
Title	Year	Peak chart positions	
Title	Year	FRA	QUE
"Jazzy retro satanas"	1980	74	—
"Juke Box"	1980	—	—
"Tamalou"	1980	33	—
"Villégiature"	1981	48	10
"Tirez pas sur l'ambulance"	1982	47	2
"Moi vouloir toi"	1982	48	26
"C'est bien moi"	1982	—	—
"Moi vouloir toi" (new version)	1984	—	—
"V.I.P."	1986	48	—
"Partir quand même"	1988	33	—
"Laisse-moi rêver"	1989	—	44
"La sieste"	1989	—	—
"En résumé... en conclusion"	1989	—	—
"—" denotes releases that did not chart or were not released in that territory.

=== 1990s–present ===
Title	Year	Peak chart positions			
Title	Year	FRA	BEL (FLA)	BEL (WA)	JPN
"Je ne suis là pour personne"	1990	—	—	—	—
"Comment te dire adieu" (re-release)	1990	—	—	—	70
"Si ça fait mal" (with Alain Lubrano)	1993	—	—	—	—
"Revenge of the Flowers" (with Malcolm McLaren)	1995	—	—	—	—
"To the End (La comedie)" (with Blur)	1995	—	—	—	—
"Mode d'emploi ?"	1996	—	—	—	—
"Les madeleines"	1997	—	—	—	—
"Puisque vous partez en voyage" (with Jacques Dutronc)	2000	30	—	34	—
"Noir sur blanc"	2010	—	— (Note: Peaked at number 16 on the Flanders Ultratip chart.)	21	—
"Champ d'honneur"	2010	—	—	— (Note: Peaked at number 16 on the Wallonia Ultratip.)	—
"Pourquoi vous ?"	2012	120	—	— (Note: Peaked at number 5 on the Wallonia Ultratip.)	—
"Rendez-vous dans une autre vie"	2013	—	—	— (Note: Peaked at number 24 on the Wallonia Ultratip.)	—
"True Love Ways" (with Dominique Blanc-Francard)	2016	—	—	—	—
"Le large"	2018	—	—	— (Note: Peaked at number 18 on the Wallonia Ultratip.)	—
"À cache-cache"	2018	—	—	—	—
"Le temps de l'amour" (vs Bon Entendeur)	2021	—	—	—	—
"—" denotes releases that did not chart or were not released in that territory.
