= Françoise Hardy (disambiguation) =

Françoise Hardy is a French singer and actress. It may also refer to:

- Françoise Hardy (1962 album), Vogue LD 60030
- Françoise Hardy (1963 album), Vogue FH 1
- Françoise Hardy (1965 album), Vogue FH 3
- Françoise Hardy in English, a 1966 album
- Françoise Hardy (1968 album), Vogue CLD-728
