= Tous les garçons et les filles =

1962 song by Françoise Hardy

Contact avec Françoise Hardy
- The debut on 45 rpm (1st French edition)

EP by Françoise Hardy
- Released: June 1962
- Recorded: Studio Vogue, Villetaneuse, France
- Genre: Chanson, Yé-yé
- Length: 3:07
- Label: Disques Vogue
- Producer: Jacques Wolfsohn

"Tous les garçons et les filles"
- B-side under paper sleeve

Single by Françoise Hardy

from the album Françoise Hardy
- A-side: "J'suis d'accord"
- Released: 1962
- Genre: French pop
- Length: 5:05
- Label: Disques Vogue
- Songwriters: Françoise Hardy, Roger Samyn

Music video
- "Tous les garçons et les filles" (French TV, 1964) on YouTube

"Tous les garçons et les filles" (English: "All the Boys and Girls") is a song by French singer-songwriter Françoise Hardy, co-written with Roger Samyn. The song recounts the feelings of a young person who has never known love and her envy of the couples that surround her. Hardy's single, released internationally, was a massive hit in France, where it spent 15 non-consecutive weeks at number one (four separate runs) between late October 1962 and mid-April 1963.

== Background ==
Hardy performed the song in a telecast on the evening of Sunday 28 October 1962 in a musical interlude during the results of the 1962 referendum to allow direct election of the president of the French Republic. The record quickly became a success, selling 500,000 copies by the end of the year. In Italy the Italian version sold 255,000 while French version sold 140,000 copies.

Françoise Hardy also recorded the song in English ("Find Me a Boy", 1964), Italian ("Quelli della mia età", 1962; collected in Françoise Hardy canta per voi in italiano, 1963), and German ("Peter und Lou", 1963; collected in In Deutschland, 1965.)

Jimmy Page participated in the recording session as a session musician.

The song is quoted several times by the main characters in J.L. Carr's 1988 novel What Hetty Did.

== Charts ==
Weekly chart performance for “Tous les garçons et les filles”
Chart (1962–64)	Peak position
Belgium (Ultratop 50 Flanders)	11
Belgium (Ultratop 50 Wallonia)	1
France (IFOP)	1
Italy (Musica e dischi)	2
Netherlands (Single Top 100)	4
UK Singles (OCC)	36
West Germany (Media Control)	20

== EP track list ==
Side A
No.	Title	Lyrics	Music	Length
1.	"Oh oh chéri" (original title "Uh Oh")	Bobby Lee Trammell, ad. by Jil and Jan.	Bobby Lee Trammell	2:20
2.	"Il est parti un jour"	Françoise Hardy	Françoise Hardy – Roger Samyn	1:47

Side B
No.	Title	Lyrics	Music	Length
1.	"J’suis d’accord"	Françoise Hardy	Françoise Hardy – Roger Samyn	2:00
2.	"Tous les garçons et les filles"	Françoise Hardy	Françoise Hardy – Roger Samyn	3:05

== SP track listing ==
Side A
No.	Title	Lyrics	Music	Length
1.	"J’suis d’accord"	Françoise Hardy	Françoise Hardy – Roger Samyn	2:00

Side B
No.	Title	Lyrics	Music	Length
1.	"Tous les garçons et les filles"	Françoise Hardy	Françoise Hardy – Roger Samyn	3:05

== Cover versions ==
The song has been covered by many artists in many languages, including:

- Lill-Babs (in Swedish, "Vart Jag Än Går", 1963)
- Sophie Blaede (1962)
- Olivia Chaney (in French, Six French Songs, EP, 2023)
- Ginette Reno (1962)
- Catherine Spaak (1962)
- Aimable (on the accordion, 1963)
- Steve Perry (British singer) (in English, "Find Me a Girl", 1963)
- Eny Mara (in Portuguese, "A Idade Do Amor", 1964)
- Maurice Chevalier (as "Mes Chers Zazas", with new lyrics by Edmond Meunier, 1965)
- Dulce Salles Cunha Braga (1965)
- Mia Frye (in English, "All the Girls and Boys", 1984)
- Eurythmics (bonus track on the album Be Yourself Tonight and, in some countries, B-side of the single "It's Alright - (Baby's Coming Back)"); sung in French by Annie Lennox
- The Paquitas (accompanists of Xuxa) (in Portuguese, "Alguem para amar", 1991)
- Janusz Laskowski (in Polish, "Och jak bardzo cię kocham", album Nigdy nie byłem w Casablance, 1994)
- Laurent Voulzy and Carla Bruni singing with the Enfoirés (album Les Enfoirés à l'Opéra comique, 1995)
- Marie Myriam (1996)
- Gigliola Cinquetti ("Quelli della mia età", 1999)
- Saint Etienne ("Find Me a Boy", album The Misadventures of Saint Etienne, music for the film Les Folies de Margaret (The Misadventures of Margaret), released in Japan in 1999)
- The Dresden Dolls
- Thanh Lan in French and Vietnamese
- Zona Zul (album Beira, 2006)
- Cœur de pirate
- Elastic No-No Band (2007 live recording, released in 2012 compilation Not Like Most Folkies, Part 2: Early Covers)
- Raymond & Maria - released in single Ingen vill veta var du köpt din tröja
- Pomme (Live for Sourdoreille in 2019)

== Movie soundtracks ==
=== "Tous les garçons et les filles" ===
- Metroland, United Kingdom, 1997
  - CD, Metroland, Warner Bros. Records, 1998 (UK).
- The Dreamers (Innocents: The Dreamers), France, Italy, United Kingdom, 2003
  - CD, The Dreamers, Universal Records (9812084), 2003 (UK)
- The Statement (Crime contre l’humanité), Canada, France, United Kingdom, 2003
- Se devo essere sincera, Italy, 2004
- Attenberg, Greece, 2011

=== "Find Me a Boy" ===
- The Misadventures of Margaret, United Kingdom, 1998
  - Performed by Françoise Hardy and performed by Saint Etienne

-All These Sleepless Nights-
