= Electronica =

Broad group of electronic-based music genres

- Stylistic origins: Electronic; techno; synth-pop; hip-hop; ambient
- Cultural origins: Early 1990s, United Kingdom
- Derivative forms: Alternative dance; IDM; illbient; post-dubstep

Fusion genres
- Asian Underground; ethnic electronica; folktronica; indietronica

Other topics
- Computer music; glitch; post-rock

Electronica is both a broad group of electronic-based music styles intended for listening rather than strictly for dancing and a music scene that came to prominence in the early 1990s in the United Kingdom which incorporated various musical styles. In the United States, the term is mostly used to refer to electronic music generally.

== History ==
=== Early 1990s: Origins and UK scene ===
The original widespread use of the term "electronica" derives from the influential English experimental techno label New Electronica, which was one of the leading forces of the early 1990s introducing and supporting dance-based electronic music oriented towards home listening rather than dance-floor play, although the word "electronica" had already begun to be associated with synthesizer generated music as early as 1983, when a "UK Electronica Festival" was first held. At that time electronica became known as "electronic listening music", also becoming more or less synonymous to ambient techno and intelligent techno, and was considered distinct from other emerging genres such as jungle and trip hop.

Electronica artists that would later become commercially successful began to record in the late 1980s, before the term had come into common usage, including for example the Prodigy, Fatboy Slim, Daft Punk, the Chemical Brothers, the Crystal Method, Moby, Underworld and Faithless.

=== Mid-late 1990s: Effect on mainstream popular music ===
Around the mid-to-late 1990s, with the success of the big beat-sound exemplified by the Chemical Brothers and the Prodigy in the UK, and spurred by the attention from mainstream artists, including Madonna in her collaboration with William Orbit on her album Ray of Light and Australian singer Dannii Minogue with her 1997 album Girl, music of this period began to be produced with a higher budget, increased technical quality, and with more layers than most other forms of dance music, since it was backed by major record labels and MTV as the "next big thing".

According to a 1997 Billboard article, "the union of the club community and independent labels" provided the experimental and trend-setting environment in which electronica acts developed and eventually reached the mainstream. It cites American labels such as Astralwerks (the Chemical Brothers, Fatboy Slim, the Future Sound of London, Fluke), Moonshine (DJ Keoki), Sims, and City of Angels (the Crystal Method) for playing a significant role in discovering and marketing artists who became popularized in the electronica scene.

Madonna and Björk are said to be responsible for electronica's thrust into mainstream culture, with their albums Ray of Light (Madonna), Post and Homogenic (Björk).

=== Late 1990s: American inclusion ===
In 1997, the North American mainstream music industry adopted and to some extent manufactured electronica as an umbrella term encompassing styles such as techno, big beat, drum and bass, trip hop, downtempo, and ambient, regardless of whether it was curated by indie labels catering to the "underground" nightclub and rave scenes, or licensed by major labels and marketed to mainstream audiences as a commercially viable alternative to alternative rock music.

New York City became one center of experimentation and growth for the electronica sound, with DJs and music producers from areas as diverse as Southeast Asia and Brazil bringing their creative work to the nightclubs of that city.

== Characteristics and definition ==
Electronica benefited from industry advancements in music technology, especially electronic musical instruments, synthesizers, music sequencers, drum machines, and digital audio workstations. As the technology developed, it became possible for individuals or smaller groups to produce electronic songs and recordings in smaller studios, even in project studios. At the same time, computers facilitated the use of music samples and loops as construction kits for sonic compositions. This led to a period of creative experimentation and the development of new forms, some of which became known as electronica. Wide ranges of influences, both sonic and compositional, are combined in electronica recordings.

Electronica includes a wide variety of musical acts and styles, linked by a penchant for overtly electronic production; a range which includes more popular acts such as Björk, Madonna, Goldfrapp and IDM artists such as Autechre, and Aphex Twin.

=== Regional differences ===
The North American mainstream music industry uses the term as an umbrella category to refer any dance-based electronic music styles with a potential for pop appeal. However, United States–based AllMusic still categorizes electronica as a top-level genre, stating that it includes danceable grooves, as well as music for headphones and chillout areas.

In other parts of the world, especially in the UK, electronica is also a broad term, but is associated with non-dance-oriented music, including relatively experimental styles of listening electronic music. It partly overlaps what is known chiefly outside the UK as intelligent dance music (IDM).

== Included in contemporary media ==
In the late 1990s and early 2000s, electronica was increasingly used as background scores for television advertisements, initially for automobiles. It was also used for various video games, including the Wipeout series, for which the soundtrack was composed of many popular electronica tracks that helped create more interest in this type of music—and later for other technological and business products such as computers and financial services. Then in 2011, Hyundai Veloster, in association with the Grammys, produced a project that became known as Re:Generation.

== See also ==
- List of electronic music genres
