= Cole Williams (musician) =

American singer-songwriter and actress

- Born: Brooklyn, New York, U.S.
- Origin: New Orleans, Louisiana, U.S.
- Genres: Soul; gospel; funk; reggae; afrobeat
- Occupations: Singer-songwriter; actress; producer; broadcaster
- Instruments: Vocals; piano; percussion
- Years active: 2007–present
- Labels: That'sMy Worldwide Records; Four Corners Records; Louisiana Red Hot Records
- Website: colewilliamsmusic.com

Cole Williams is a Jamaican-American singer-songwriter, actress, producer, broadcaster, and community organizer. She is the lead vocalist of the Cole Williams Band and the host of The New Orleans Music Show on WWOZ 90.7 FM. Williams has appeared on NCIS: New Orleans and Big Freedia Means Business.

== Early life and education ==
Williams was born in Brooklyn, New York, to a Jamaican mother and an American father. She performed in church choirs and studied classical piano in childhood and appeared in youth recitals at Carnegie Hall. She attended Brooklyn Technical High School and earned a Bachelor of Music in classical vocal performance from New Jersey City University.

After completing her studies, Williams performed as a recording artist and vocalist in New York and Europe. Her early exposure to gospel, soul, and reggae influenced her musical development. She relocated to New Orleans in the mid-2010s.

== Career ==
Williams released music independently through her label, That’sMy Worldwide Records, including The Basement Sessions EP (2007) and Out of the Basement, Out of the Box (2011). Her single “Little Me” (2011) addressed socially conscious themes.

From 2013 to 2015, Williams was a member of Pimps of Joytime, contributing to the album Jukestone Paradise and touring as a singer and percussionist. During this period, she performed with the Pimps of Joytime at the Voodoo Music + Arts Experience. She performed with artists such as Joey Bada$$, Beats By The Pound, Aloe Blacc, Somi, Walter "Wolfman" Washington, Nickodemus, Lisa Lisa, and Little Jackie. As an actress, Williams appeared on NCIS: New Orleans, Big Freedia Means Business, Sinners, and People We Meet on Vacation.

After moving to New Orleans, Williams formed the Cole Williams Band, blending soul, funk, reggae, and Afrobeat. The band performed at the New Orleans Jazz & Heritage Festival, French Quarter Festival, Blue Note NYC, World Cafe Live, and the Joshua Tree Music Festival. She later released her solo album Give Power to the People (2021). The band released covers such as Sam Cooke's "A Change Is Gonna Come."

Williams has produced cultural documentaries for WWOZ, including CloseUp: Tank and the Bangas, Irma’s Story, and independently produced Unsung Heroes. She hosts The New Orleans Music Show, featuring local musicians and cultural programming.

In 2015, Williams released the track Stand Tall, produced in collaboration with DJ Cassady. In 2017, she hosted workshops with the New Orleans Jazz Museum, teaching youth about storytelling and songwriting, and performed a show titled We R African Rock. She also performed at C'mon Everybody in Brooklyn.

In 2024, she released How We Care for Humanity through Four Corners Records, with the lead single "A Better Woman" appearing on The Originals Vol. 3 compilation. Williams appeared on WWL-TV’s Chip Forstall Sound Stage, performing and discussing her new music.

Williams co-hosted the 2025 Jazz & Heritage Gala and joined the New Orleans Jazz & Heritage Foundation as Manager of Community Partnerships and Arts Advocacy. She has composed jingles for local organizations and participated in music programs and festivals in New Orleans.

Williams performed at the Ooh Poo Pah Doo Lounge (2016), the Congo Square Rhythms Festival (2017, 2025), World Cafe Live in Philadelphia (2017), Treme Fest (2019), and in Nashville (2019). In 2020, she participated in I Can Do That: International Touring, a webinar hosted by Ron Rona of Preservation Hall. In 2024, she presented Give Power The People LIVE, her solo piano show organized by That’sMy Worldwide Entertainment and Lenox Road Productions.

== Community work ==
In 2020, Williams founded the Greater New Orleans Citizens Relief Team (GNOCRT) under the mentorship of civil rights activist Curtis Muhammad. The organization provides food distribution, housing repair, and advocacy for unhoused and underserved residents. She hosts weekly open rehearsals, followed by the program Poets On Poet with Chuck Perkins.

In 2023, she co-produced the podcast House the Houseless: Music & Action with Ropeadope Records, combining live performance with activism.

== Artistic style and influences ==
Williams’ music combines soul, gospel, funk, reggae, and Afrobeat, reflecting her Caribbean heritage, Brooklyn upbringing, and New Orleans influences. Her lyrics address social justice and community issues, including songs such as Inherit the Earth, Organize, and Who Cares For The Houseless On The Holidays. Her music has been described as rooted in the tradition of Gil Scott-Heron.

She has discussed her efforts to promote Black empowerment, humanity, and social change through her music and community work, describing her use of music as a tool for social awareness and community engagement within all communities, starting with the unhoused.

She has described her stage persona as "The Punk Empress of African Rock", reflecting her fusion of African rhythm, rock, and soul. Williams emphasizes preparation and intentionality in performance, applying discipline to both music and community engagement.

== Awards and recognition ==
- 2017: Best of the Beat Nomination, Best Female Vocalist – OffBeat Magazine
- International Songwriting Competition – Winner (2024); Finalist (2023)
- 2024: Symphonic Distribution – Listed among "Black Artists Making Waves"
- 2025: Elite Ms. Louisiana Petite – Titleholder

== Discography ==
=== Studio albums ===
Year	Title	Ref
2007	The Basement Sessions EP	
2011	Out of the Basement, Out of the Box	
2016	Sin City: The Mixtape	
2018	The Punk Empress of African Rock: Testimony	
2019	Believe	
2021	Give Power to the People	
2024	How We Care for Humanity	

=== Selected singles ===
Year	Single	Ref
2011	Little Me	
2015	Peaches 'N Herb	
2022	How We Care for Humanity	
2023	A Better Woman / Organize (reissued 2024)	

=== Other appearances ===
Year	Album / Project	Role / Contribution	Ref
2015	Jukestone Paradise	with Pimps of Joytime	
2019	Lapeitah	with Corey Henry	
2021	Bulbancia: Música Calle Y Resistencias Desde New Orleans	featured artist	
2022	Obeah Woman	with Nickodemus	
2023	New Orleans: A Writer’s City	featured artist	

== Filmography ==
=== Film ===
Year	Title	Role	Notes	Ref
2025	Spinal Tap II: The End Continues	Heavy Metal Fan	Uncredited	
2026	People We Meet on Vacation	Bar Patron	Uncredited	

=== Television ===
Year	Title	Role(s)	Notes	Ref
2019–2020	NCIS: New Orleans	WWOZ DJ / Special Live Musical Performance	2 episodes	
2024	Big Freedia Means Business	Herself	1 episode	

=== Documentary and music films ===
Year	Title	Role / Contribution	Ref
2011	Cole Williams: Little Me	Performer, Producer	
2021	Give Power to the People	Performer, Producer	
–	CloseUp: Tank and the Bangas (WWOZ)	Producer	
–	Irma’s Story (WWOZ)	Producer	
–	Unsung Heroes (Lenox Road Productions)	Producer	
