= Hur mycket jag än tar finns alltid lite kvar =

Studio album by Raymond & Maria
- Released: 2006
- Genre: Pop
- Length: 33:41
- Label: Warner Music Sweden
- Producer: Raymond & Maria

Raymond & Maria chronology
Vi ska bara leva klart (2004)	Hur mycket jag än tar finns alltid lite kvar (2006)

Hur mycket jag än tar finns alltid lite kvar is a 2006 album from Swedish pop group Raymond & Maria.

== Track listing ==
1. Dikter på fel sätt
2. Storstadskvinnor faller ner och dör
3. Jag läste om någon som stal en bil
4. Hur andra människor bor
5. Väntar
6. Kärlek 1
7. Du letar i bilen
8. Någonting på NK
9. Varför ska vi göra allt igen
10. Prins Carl Philip

== Charts ==
Chart (2006)	Peak position
Sweden (Sverigetopplistan)	31
