= List of number-one singles of 1962 (France) =

This is a list of the French singles & airplay chart reviews number-ones of 1962.

== Number-ones by week ==
=== Singles chart ===
Week	Issue date	Artist(s)	Song	Ref.
1	6 January	Henri Tisot	"L'Auto-circulation"	
2	13 January	Henri Tisot	"L'Auto-circulation"	
3	20 January	Petula Clark	"Roméo"	
4	27 January	Charles Aznavour	"Il faut savoir"	
5	3 February	Charles Aznavour	"Il faut savoir"	
6	10 February	Charles Aznavour	"Il faut savoir"	
7	17 February	Charles Aznavour	"Il faut savoir"	
8	24 February	Charles Aznavour	"Il faut savoir"	
9	3 March	Johnny Hallyday	"Retiens la nuit"	
10	10 March	Johnny Hallyday	"Retiens la nuit"	
11	17 March	Richard Anthony	"La leçon de twist"	
12	24 March	Richard Anthony	"La leçon de twist"	
13	31 March	Richard Anthony	"La leçon de twist"	
14	7 April	Richard Anthony	"La leçon de twist"	
15	14 April	Johnny Hallyday	"Retiens la nuit"	
16	21 April	Richard Anthony	"La leçon de twist"	
17	28 April	Richard Anthony	"La leçon de twist"	
18	5 May	Richard Anthony	"La leçon de twist"	
19	12 May	Richard Anthony	"La leçon de twist"	
20	19 May	Pierre Perrin	"Un clair de lune à Maubeuge"	
21	26 May	Pierre Perrin	"Un clair de lune à Maubeuge"	
22	2 June	Pierre Perrin	"Un clair de lune à Maubeuge"	
23	9 June	Pierre Perrin	"Un clair de lune à Maubeuge"	
24	16 June	Pierre Perrin	"Un clair de lune à Maubeuge"	
25	23 June	Pierre Perrin	"Un clair de lune à Maubeuge"	
26	30 June	Pierre Perrin	"Un clair de lune à Maubeuge"	
27	7 July	Pierre Perrin	"Un clair de lune à Maubeuge"	
28	14 July	Pierre Perrin	"Un clair de lune à Maubeuge"	
29	21 July	Richard Anthony	"J'entends siffler le train"	
30	28 July	Richard Anthony	"J'entends siffler le train"	
31	4 August	Richard Anthony	"J'entends siffler le train"	
32	11 August	Richard Anthony	"J'entends siffler le train"	
33	18 August	Richard Anthony	"J'entends siffler le train"	
34	25 August	Richard Anthony	"J'entends siffler le train"	
35	1 September	Richard Anthony	"J'entends siffler le train"	
36	8 September	Richard Anthony	"J'entends siffler le train"	
37	15 September	Richard Anthony	"J'entends siffler le train"	
38	22 September	Richard Anthony	"J'entends siffler le train"	
39	29 September	Richard Anthony	"J'entends siffler le train"	
40	6 October	Petula Clark	"Chariot"	
41	13 October	Sylvie Vartan	"Le Loco-Motion"	
42	20 October	Richard Anthony	"J'entends siffler le train"	
43	27 October	Françoise Hardy	"Tous les garçons et les filles"	
44	3 November	Françoise Hardy	"Tous les garçons et les filles"	
45	10 November	Richard Anthony	"J'entends siffler le train"	
46	17 November	Johnny Hallyday	"L'Idole des jeunes"	
47	24 November	Johnny Hallyday	"L'Idole des jeunes"	
48	1 December	Johnny Hallyday	"L'Idole des jeunes"	
49	8 December	Dalida	"Le jour le plus long"	
50	15 December	Johnny Hallyday	"L'Idole des jeunes"	
51	22 December	Françoise Hardy	"Tous les garçons et les filles"	
52	29 December	Françoise Hardy	"Tous les garçons et les filles"	

== See also ==
- 1962 in music
- List of number-one hits (France)
