= In Deutschland =

Studio album by Françoise Hardy
- Released: September 1965 (Germany)
- Recorded: Germany
- Genre: French pop
- Length: 29:13
- Language: German
- Label: Bellaphon/Disques Vogue
- Producer: Jacques Wolfsohn

Françoise Hardy chronology
Mon amie la rose (1964)	In Deutschland (1965)	Françoise Hardy (1965)

In Deutschland is a 1965 album by the French pop singer Françoise Hardy. It was her first German-language album released in Germany in September 1965, on LP, Bellaphon/Disques Vogue (BWS 368). The 12 songs of this album have been reissued on CD entitled Frag' den Abendwind, in 2001, on RCA/BMG (7432 1 844422 7).

== Track list ==
Side 1

1. "Wenn dieses Lied erklingt" – 2:30
  Lyrics by: Peter Wehle
  Music written by: Joe Dixie
2. "Frag' den Abendwind" – 2:35
  Lyrics by: Joachim Relin
  Music written by: Fred Gordini
3. "Dann bist Du verliebt" – 2:38
  Lyrics by: Joachim Relin
  Music written by: Fred Gordini
4. "Ein Fenster wird hell" – 2:33
  Original title: "Dans le monde entier"
  Lyrics and music written by: Françoise Hardy, 1965
  German adaptation by: Kurt Hertha
5. "Er war wie Du" – 2:13
  Lyrics by: Ernst Bader
  Music written by: Friedel Berlipp
6. "Wer Du bist" – 2:25
  Lyrics by: Fini Busch
  Music written by: Werner Scharfenberger

Side 2

1. "Ich hab’ das Glück" – 2:06
  Original title: "J’aurais voulu"
  Lyrics and music written by: Françoise Hardy, 1963
  German adaptation by: C. U. Blecher
2. "Ich sag’ ja" – 2:20
  Original title: J’suis d’accord
  Lyrics by: Françoise Hardy
  Music written by: Françoise Hardy and Roger Samyn, 1962
  German adaptation by: Kurt Schwabach
3. "Peter und Lou" – 2:50
  Original title: "Tous les garçons et les filles"
  Lyrics by: Françoise Hardy
  Music written by: Françoise Hardy and Roger Samyn, 1962
  German adaptation by: Ernst Bader
4. "Die Liebe geht" – 2:25
  Original title: "L’Amour s’en va"
  Lyrics and music written by: Françoise Hardy, 1963
  German adaptation by: Ernst Bader
5. "Ich steige Dir auf’s Dach" – 2:18
  Lyrics by: Willy Schüller
  Music written by: Georg Möckel
  First performed by: Bärbel Wachholz, 1957
6. "Oh, Oh Chérie" – 2:15
  Original title: "Uh Oh"
  Lyrics and music written by Bobby Lee Trammell
  First performed by Bobby Lee Trammell in 1958
  German adaptation by: J.R. Setti and G. Guenet
