= Françoise Hardy canta per voi in italiano =

- First Italian sleeve

Studio album by Françoise Hardy
- Released: November 1963
- Recorded: Milan (Italy)
- Length: 24:16
- Language: Italian
- Label: Disques Vogue
- Producer: Jacques Wolfsohn

Françoise Hardy chronology
Françoise Hardy (1963)	Françoise Hardy canta per voi in italiano (1963)	Mon amie la rose (1964)

Alternative cover
- Second Italian sleeve

Reissues
- UK CD cover (2013)

Alternative cover
- Italian LP (2013) & CD cover (2014)

Françoise Hardy canta per voi in italiano is the only Italian-language studio album released into Italy of French popular singer Françoise Hardy. This album was released in November 1963 under label Disques Vogue. The first compact disc appeared in January 2013.

== Two album covers ==
- First: Marcel Hendrix orchestra is not credited to the back cover and the 2nd album is announced in preparation without revealing the picture sleeve
- Second: Marcel Hendrix orchestra is credited to the back cover and the 2nd album released; the picture sleeve was added

=== Track listing ===
_{Nota bene: The list of songs printed on the back cover does not match the contents of the disc, but the one printed on the labels of the disc is correct.}

Orchestras: Ezio Leoni (A1, A2, A3, A5, B2, B3, B4) - Marcel Hendrix (A4, B1, B5)

Side one
No.	Title	Lyrics	Music	Length
1.	"L'età dell'amore" ("Le Temps de l'amour")	Vito Pallavicini	Jacques Dutronc	2:44
2.	"Il tuo migliore amico" ("Ton meilleur ami")	Vito Pallavicini	Françoise Hardy - Roger Samyn	2:11
3.	"È all'amore che penso" ("C'est à l'amour auquel je pense")	Vito Pallavicini	Françoise Hardy - Roger Samyn	2:32
4.	"Una ragazza come le altre" ("Comme tant d'autres")	Vito Pallavicini	Françoise Hardy	2:27
5.	"Quelli della mia età" ("Tous les garçons et les filles")	Vito Pallavicini	Roger Samyn et Françoise Hardy	3:11
Total length:				13:05

Side B
No.	Title	Lyrics	Music	Length
1.	"L'amore va" ("L'Amour s'en va")	Vito Pallavicini	Françoise Hardy	2:39
2.	"Ci sto" ("J'suis d'accord")	Vito Pallavicini	Françoise Hardy - Roger Samyn	2:03
3.	"Per tanto tempo" ("Bien longtemps")	Vito Pallavicini	Françoise Hardy	1:59
4.	"Oh oh chéri" ("Oh oh chéri")	Vito Pallavicini	Bobby Lee Trammell	2:27
5.	"Io vorrei (capirti)" ("Saurai-je ?")	Vito Pallavicini	Françoise Hardy	2:03
Total length:				11:11

== Reissue on CD into United Kingdom ==
- CD (jewel case) released in January 2013 with cover's replica of first album released into UK in 1964. Contains 12 songs in French language of this album + 10 songs from Françoise Hardy canta per voi in italiano, where the titles are in the same order as engraved on the original disk.

=== Track listing ===
In the same order as in the first edition of 1963 (see above).

== Reissues on LP and CD into Italy ==
- LP released in February 2013 with the second cover's replica of Françoise Hardy canta per voi in italiano. Contains 10 songs in the order written on the back of the 1963 cover.
- CD (card sleeve) released in February 2014 with the second cover's replica of Françoise Hardy canta per voi in italiano. Contains 10 songs in the order written on the back of the 1963 cover + 12 bonus tracks, only realised on singles of 1963 to 1967.

=== Track listing ===
Orchestras: Ezio Leoni (A1, A4, B6, B7, B8, B9, B10) - Marcel Hendrix (A2, A3, A5)

Side A
No.	Title	Lyrics	Music	Length
1.	"Il tuo migliore amico" ("Ton meilleur ami")	Vito Pallavicini	Françoise Hardy & Roger Samyn	2:11
2.	"Vorrei capirti" ("Saurai-je ?")	Vito Pallavicini	Françoise Hardy	2:03
3.	"Per tanto tempo" ("Bien longtemps")	Vito Pallavicini	Françoise Hardy	1:59
4.	"L'amore va" ("L'Amour s'en va")	Vito Pallavicini	Françoise Hardy	2:39
5.	"Una ragazza come le altre" ("Comme tant d'autres")	Vito Pallavicini	Françoise Hardy	2:27
Total length:				11:19

Side B
No.	Title	Lyrics	Music	Length
1.	"Quelli della mia età" ("Tous les garçons et les filles")	Vito Pallavicini	Françoise Hardy - Roger Samyn	3:11
2.	"Ci sto" ("Je suis d’accord")	Vito Pallavicini	Françoise Hardy - Roger Samyn	2:03
3.	"È all'amore che penso" ("C'est à l'amour auquel je pense")	Vito Pallavicini	Françoise Hardy - Roger Samyn	2:32
4.	"L'età dell'amore" ("Le Temps de l'amour")	Vito Pallavicini	Jacques Dutronc	2:44
5.	"Oh oh chéri" ("Oh oh chéri")	Vito Pallavicini	Bobby Lee Trammell	2:27
Total length:				12:57

=== Bonus - track listing ===
Orchestras: Marcel Hendrix (11) - Ezio Leoni (12, 13) - Charles Blackwell (14, 15, 17, 18, 19, 20, 21, 22)

No.	Title	Lyrics	Music	Length
11.	"Il saluto del mattino " ("Le Premier Bonheur du jour")	Vito Pallavicini	Jean Renard	2:20
12.	"La tua mano "	Vito Pallavicini	Ezio Leoni	2’ 27’’
13.	"Vorrei essere lei " ("J'aurais voulu")	Vito Pallavicini	Françoise Hardy	2’ 10’’
14.	"Devi ritornare " ("Only You Can Do It")	Vito Pallavicini	Charles Blackwell	2’ 50’’
15.	"La notte sulla città " ("La nuit est sur la ville")	Vito Pallavicini	Françoise Hardy	2’ 15’’
16.	"Parlami di te "	Vito Pallavicini	Edoardo Vianello	2’ 52’’
17.	"Nel mondo intero " ("Dans le monde entier")	Calimero	Françoise Hardy	2’ 33’’
18.	"Non svegliarmi mai " ("Don’t Come Any Closer")	Vito Pallavicini	Charles Blackwell	3’ 02’’
19.	"Ci sono cose piu grandi " ("Il est des choses")	Baghira - Sabato	Edoardo Vianello	2’ 32’’
20.	"Gli altri " ("Voilà")	Herbert Pagani	Françoise Hardy	3’ 27’’
21.	"I sentimenti " ("Et même")	Vito Pallavicini	Françoise Hardy	2’ 16’’
22.	"Il ragazzo della via Gluck" ("La Maison où j’ai grandi")	Luciano Beretta – Miki Del Prete	Adriano Celentano	3’35’’
Total length:				32:09
