= Françoise in Italian =

Compilation album by Françoise Hardy
- Released: 1970
- Recorded: Studio CBE, Paris, France
- Genre: Pop
- Length: 26:50
- Language: Italian
- Label: World Record Co. (South Africa)
- Producer: Françoise Hardy (Production Hypopotam)

Françoise Hardy chronology
Françoise (1970)	Françoise in Italian (1970)	Soleil (1970)

Françoise in Italian is a compilation album by the French popular singer Françoise Hardy where all songs are in Italian language. This compilation was only published in South Africa in 1970 under label World Record Co. It contains ten titles published in singles under Italian label Compagnia Generale del Disco, of 1968 to 1970.

== From Italy towards South Africa ==
Since the release of her first album in Italian, Françoise Hardy recorded many singles in Italian which, while not made into a record of its own, were parlayed into various single collections in Italy. In 1968, when the singer changed distributive firm into Italy, a dozen titles were recorded until 1970 but no album was released, unless one counts a compilation, wherein half the songs were in French with the other half in Italian. At the end of her contract with her former label and after having broken with Vogue, Hardy made this compilation, released under the guise of Hypopotam, the production company she founded in 1970. However, this compilation does not collect those ten songs This compilation was only distributed in South Africa, where Hardy's discs sold well and where she received a positive reception for the tour she undertook there from February 26 to March 16, 1968.

=== Track listing ===
Side 1
No.	Title	Lyrics	Music	Length
1.	"La bilancia dell'amore" ("Tiny Goddess")	Vito Pallavicini	Patrick Campbell-Lyons, Alex Spyropoulos	3:10
2.	"Il male d'amore" ("À quoi ça sert ?")	Herbert Pagani	Françoise Hardy	3:27
3.	"Io conosco la vita" ("À la fin de l’été (Tu sais)")	Alberto Testa	Gérard Bourgeois	2:37
4.	"Stivali di vernice blu" ("Des bottes rouges de Russie")	Herbert Pagani	André Popp	2:45
5.	"C'e la fortuna" ("There but for fortune")	Herbert Pagani	Phil Ochs	3:10
6.	"Il mare, le stelle, il vento" ("La Mer, les étoiles et le vent")	Annarita	Françoise Hardy	1:50
Total length:				17:00

Side 2
No.	Title	Lyrics	Music	Length
1.	"L'ora blu" ("L'Heure bleue")	Herbert Pagani	Françoise Hardy	1:45
2.	"Se e ma" ("Avec des si")	Herbert Pagani	Françoise Hardy	3:07
3.	"Il pretesto" ("It Hurts To Say Goodbye")	Claudio Daiano	Arnold Goland, arr. Serge Gainsbourg	2:23
4.	"Lungo il mare"	Luigi Albertelli, Renzetti	Torrebruno	2:16
Total length:				9:50
