= Tous les garçons et les filles (album) =

Studio album by Françoise Hardy
- Released: November 1962 (France)
- Studios: Studio Vogue, Villetaneuse, France
- Genre: Yé-yé
- Length: 28:55
- Language: French
- Label: Disques Vogue
- Producer: Jacques Wolfsohn

Françoise Hardy chronology
Tous les garçons et les filles (1962)	Le premier bonheur du jour (1963)

Singles from Tous les garçons et les filles
- 1. "Oh oh chéri" / "J’suis d’accord" Released: 1962; 2. "J’suis d’accord" / "Tous les garçons et les filles"" Released: 1962; 3. "Ça a raté" Released: 1962; 4. "J’ai jeté mon cœur" / On se plaît"" Released: February 1996; 5. "Tous les garçons et les filles" Released: 1963; 6. "Le temps de l’amour" / "Ton meilleur ami" Released: 1963

Tous les garçons et les filles is the debut studio album by French singer-songwriter Françoise Hardy, released in November 1962 on Disques Vogue. Like many of her following records, it was originally released without a title and to be referred to, later on, by the name of its most popular song. Released when Hardy was 18 years old, the album was a commercial success and "went on to top charts". It was originally released in the United States under the title The "Yeh-Yeh" Girl From Paris! in 1965 on "proto-world music label" Four Corners.

== Composition ==
Tous les garçons et les filles is a yé-yé album that combines elements of rockabilly, folk, jazz and blues. Marc Hogan of Pitchfork felt that the album "finds an enduring middle ground between rockabilly shimmy and Gallic introspection". It has been noted for its simplicity, featuring a minimalist jazz percussion, prominent bass, and twangy guitars. Stewart Mason of AllMusic considered the album to be "the '60s pop equivalent of Shaker furniture: free of ornamentation and exquisitely simple." This distanced Hardy from the "bombastic" music of her yé-yé contemporaries. John Paul of Spectrum Culture felt that, although Hardy's music has "its origins in the American girl group sounds and their trademark harmonies," it is interesting that it "[features] little more than this stripped down approach, allowing for her voice to ring through clearly without being saddled with superfluous instrumentation and backing vocals."

Although Tous les garçons et les filles followed the formula of the yé-yé movement—characterized by attractive teenage girls singing innocent pop songs about adolescence—Hardy set herself apart from her peers by writing most of her own material. Moreover, her love-focused lyrics were "devoid of older, male sexualization or control, a privilege not many others of her era enjoyed." Hardy's vocal delivery has been described as "disarmingly conversational". Mason felt that throughout the record, she sings "in an attractive but chilly drop-dead monotone that's far removed from the perkiness of almost every other female singer (minus Nico and Mary Weiss of the Shangri-Las) of the '60s." Hazel Cills wrote in 2015:

Her lyrics would never hew this close to yé-yé traditions again: See the "whoa-oh-oh" echoing on tracks like "Il Est Tout Pour Moi" and her cover of Bobby Lee Trammell's "Oh Oh Chéri". The title track "Tous Les Garcons Et Les Filles" remains an iconic vision of Hardy's aesthetic: frank music for romantic wallflowers.

== Legacy ==
Professional ratings
Retrospective reviews
Review scores
Source	Rating
AllMusic	4/5 stars
Exclaim!	(10/10)
Pitchfork	(8.6/10)

Hardy's output during the early 1960s saw her "artistic stock rise above the teenybopper fray", allowing her career to last "well beyond yé-yé's faddishness." It established Hardy as one of the few French pop stars of her era to cross over to international audiences. She continued to record frequently in England and France, serving as a muse to designers like Yves Saint Laurent, inspiring rock artists such as Bob Dylan and Mick Jagger, and "[keeping] company with members of the Rolling Stones, the Beatles and the like. She remains "an icon as both a songwriter and public figure", and Tous les garçons et les filles continues to be acclaimed in retrospect, considered a classic of the French chanson. Stewart Mason of AllMusic considered it "an outstanding record." Writing for Exclaim!, Cosette Schulz described Hardy as, "a master of crafting simple but stellar tracks." Pitchfork's Hazel Cills praised Hardy's songwriting, which she called "profoundly lonely, frequently insecure." She further wrote: "Hardy’s songs feel timeless in how they emphasize a universal dream for pure love. Is this music antique in its sound? Surely. In its sentiment? Hardly." In 2017, Pitchfork included Tous les garçons et les filles in its list of The 200 Best Albums of the 1960s at number 90, with Marc Hogan writing: "Her music would grow more intricate and eclectic over the years, most notably on 1971's bossa nova–tinged masterwork La question, but the reasons she ruled over the yé-yé period are apparent on her debut album."

The album's most popular song, "Tous les garçons et les filles", also continues to receive praise by critics. Robert Dimery included the track in his 2010 reference book. 1001 Songs You Must Hear Before You Die. Pitchfork placed it at number 170 in its list of "The 200 Greatest Songs of the 1960s", with Joe Tangari writing: "Hardy's vocal is a nonchalantly solitary midnight waltz through swinging Paris." Rockdelux and writer Giannis Petridis listed the song as one of the best of the 20th century. Several French writers and publications have included "Tous les garçons et les filles" in their lists of the best French songs of all time, including Christian Eclimont, Hervé Bourhis, Le Nouvel Observateur, Pierre Saka and Stan Cuesta.

Robert Ham of Paste felt that the album "reveals a musician that had yet to fully absorb her influences and make them her own." Russell Warfield of Drowned in Sound described it as "the product of a patriarchal music industry", as he felt Hardy had not been trusted to shape her own material.

Australian plunderphonics group the Avalanches sampled "Oh oh chéri" in their acclaimed 2000 album, Since I Left You. "Le temps de l’amour" was covered by April March and Vanessa Paradis, and was included in the soundtrack for Moonrise Kingdom, a 2012 film by Wes Anderson. Moreover, "Tous les garçons et les filles" has been covered by several artists in various languages, including Lill-Babs, Ginette Reno, Catherine Spaak, the British pop singer Steve Perry, Eurythmics and Gigliola Cinquetti, among others.

== Track listing ==
All lyrics are written by Françoise Hardy; all music is composed by Françoise Hardy and Roger Gustave Samyn, except where noted.

No.	Title	Lyrics	Music	Length
1.	"Tous les garçons et les filles"			3:08
2.	"Ça a raté"			2:02
3.	"La fille avec toi"			2:40
4.	"Oh oh chéri" (original title "Uh Oh")	Bobby Lee Trammell, ad. by Jil and Jan.		2:22
5.	"Le temps de l’amour"	Lucien Morisse, André Salvet	Jacques Dutronc	2:27
6.	"Il est tout pour moi"			1:58
7.	"On se plaît"			2:09
8.	"Ton meilleur ami"			2:10
9.	"J’ai jeté mon cœur"			2:33
10.	"Il est parti un jour"			1:49
11.	"J’suis d’accord"			2:05
12.	"C’est à l’amour auquel je pense"			3:10
Total length:				28:55

== Personnel ==
- Françoise Hardy – vocals, lyrics (except 4, 5)
- Roger Samyn and his Orchestra – instrumentation; compositions (except 4, 5)
- Jean-Marie Périer – photography

== Editions ==
=== LP records: first editions in English-speaking world ===
- Canada, 1964: Trans-Canada Record/Disques Vogue (LD-600).
- United Kingdom, 1964: Pye Records(NPL 18094).
- Australia, 1965: Disques Vogue/Festival (SVL 933.199).
- New Zealand, 1965: Disques Vogue/Festival (SVL 933.199).
- South Africa, 1965: Disques Vogue (VGL 7002).
- United States, 1965: The "Yeh-Yeh" Girl From Paris!, 4 Corners of the World (FCS‑4208).

=== Some reissues on CD ===
- France, 1995: The "Yeh-Yeh" Girl from Paris!, Disques Vogue (7 43212 64702).
- France, 2013: Tous les garçons et les filles, RDM Edition (CD686).
- United Kingdom, 2013: Cherry Red Records/él Records (ACMEM241CD).
- USA, 16 October 2015: Tous les garçons et les filles, Light in the Attic Records/Future Days Recordings (FDR 614).

=== Reissues on 180g Vinyl ===
- United Kingdom, September 2014: The Original Debut Album From The French Icon, Not Now Music (NOTLP134).
- USA, January 2016: Tous les garçons et les filles, Light in the Attic Records/Future Days Recordings (FDR 614)
