= Raymond & Maria =

Swedish pop group

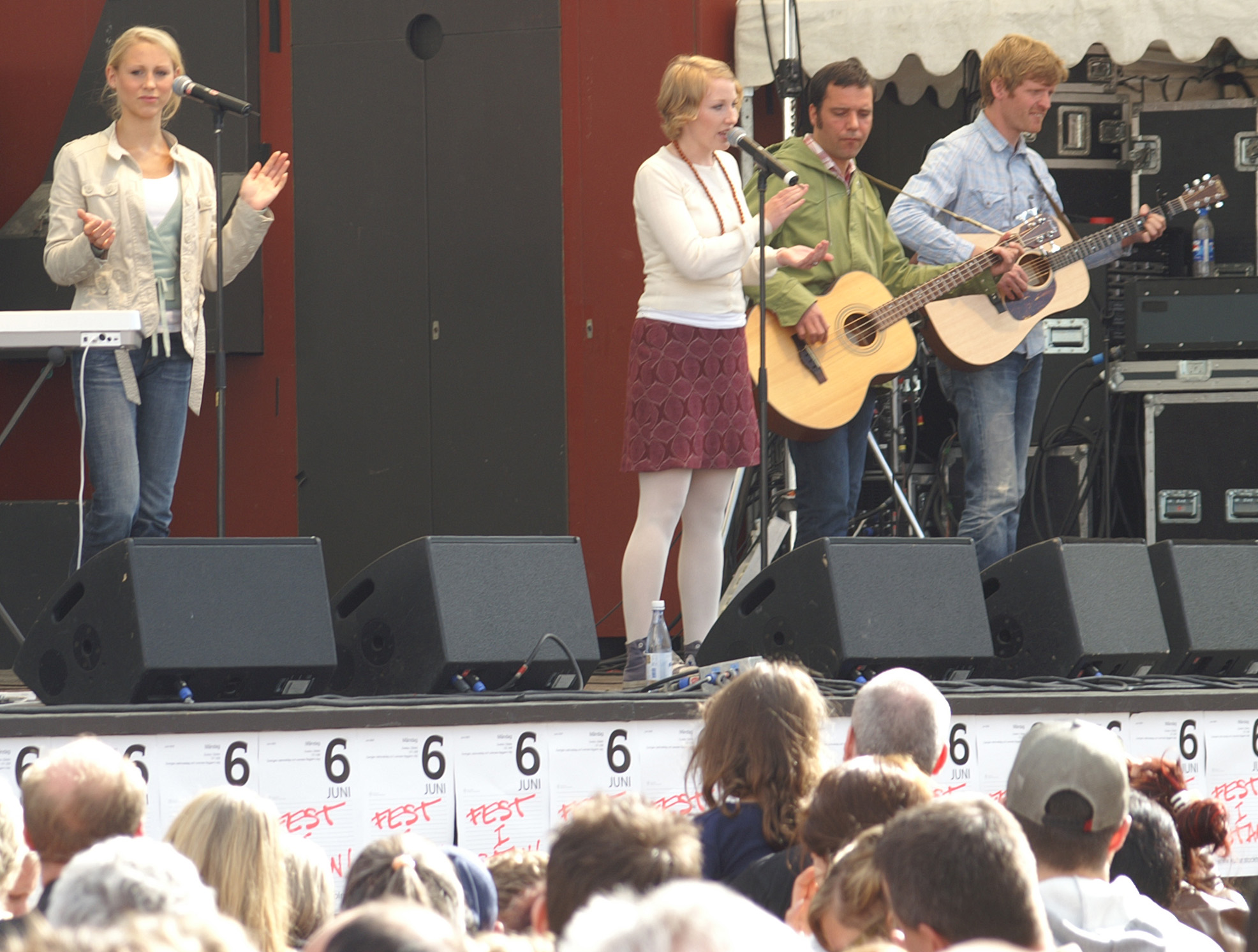
- Raymond & Maria playing at Kungsträdgården, Stockholm on National Day 2005.

Background information
- Origin: Sweden
- Genres: Pop
- Years active: 2002 – 2013
- Label: Warner Sweden
- Members: Maria (vocals); Camilla (backing vocals); Johan Kindblom (bass); Staffan (guitar); Per (guitar); Anders (drums)
- Website: Official homepage

Raymond & Maria was a Swedish pop group. It was started in 2002 by the male members of the band: Johan, Staffan, Olle and Per. As singers they found Maria and her sister Camilla. The first single from the band was Ingen vill veta var du köpt din tröja (later released in English as No One Notices Your Brand New T-shirt) in 2004. The song was number one in the Swedish charts for several weeks.

The band produced a stir when they broke through with their anti-commercial messages. The music is simple with only drums, guitar and vocals. As the band is quite concerned with their privacy, they have opted to not disclose the band members' last names. Nonetheless, it has emerged that Johan Kindblom is the author of the lyrics.

The name comes from a swinging club in Stockholm.

The band broke up in 2013.

== Discography ==
=== Albums ===
- Vi ska bara leva klart (2004)
- Hur mycket jag än tar finns alltid lite kvar (2006)
- Jobs where they don't know our names (2012) - Japan and South Korea
- Jobs where they don't know our names (1) (2012) - Sweden, Norway, Finland, Denmark

=== EPs ===
- Jobs where they don't know our names (2012) - US, UK and Canada

=== Singles ===
- Ingen vill veta var du köpt din tröja (2004) — Sweden #1
- Nej (2004)
- Min pappa (2004)
- Redan idag (2005)
- Kärlek 1 (2006)
- Storstadskvinnor faller ner och dör (2006)
- The fish are swimming slower every year (2011)
