= Vi ska bara leva klart =

Studio album by Raymond & Maria
- Released: August 18, 2004
- Genre: Pop
- Length: 38:54
- Label: Warner Sweden

Professional ratings
Review scores
Source	Rating
Foxy Digitalis	8/10 link

Vi ska bara leva klart is the debut album by Swedish pop group Raymond & Maria, released on August 18, 2004.

== Track listing ==
1. "Nej"
2. "Ingen vill veta var du köpt din tröja"
3. "Redan idag"
4. "Ingenting för dig"
5. "De älskar dig"
6. "Min pappa"
7. "Det går aldrig att bli dum igen"
8. "Vi ska bara leva klart"
9. "Som"
10. "När jag blundar"

== Charts ==
Chart (2006)	Peak position
Sweden (Sverigetopplistan)	2
