= Françoise (album) =

Compilation album by Françoise Hardy
- Released: 1970 (France)
- Recorded: Studio CBE Paris, France
- Genre: Pop
- Length: 29:35
- Languages: French, English and German
- Label: Sonopresse
- Producer: Françoise Hardy (Production Hypopotam)

Françoise Hardy chronology
Träume (1970)	Françoise (1970)	Françoise in Italian (1970)

Reissue in compact disc
- Japanese cover with obi (1990)

Françoise is a compilation album by the French popular singer Françoise Hardy. After her break with Vogue in 1969, Hardy made this album, produced by Hypopotam, her recently created record label, and distributed it through Sonopresse. The first edition released in France in 1970.

== Composition of this compilation album ==
- 2 songs in French language of the album Ma jeunesse fout le camp… (A4-B3),
- 2 songs in French language of the album Comment te dire adieu (A5-B5),
- 1 song in English language of the album En anglais (B1),
- 1 song in German language of the album Träume (A1),
- 6 remaining songs in French language produced by Asparagus, published on singles under label Vogue from June, 1968 at September, 1969 (A2-A3-A6-B2-B4-B6).

== Track listing ==
Orchestras : Saint-Preux (A1), Jean-Pierre Sabar (A2-A3-A5-A6-B2-B4), Charles Blackwell (A4-B1-B3), John Cameron (B5) & Jean-Claude Vannier (B6).

Side A
No.	Title	Lyrics	Music	Length
1.	"Träume"	Fred Weyrich	Martin Böttcher	3:06
2.	"Au fil des nuits et des journées"	Françoise Hardy	Françoise Hardy	2:05
3.	"J’ai coupé le téléphone"	Françoise Hardy	Françoise Hardy	2:02
4.	"Ma jeunesse fout le camp..."	Guy Bontempelli	Guy Bontempelli	3:08
5.	"Comment te dire adieu"	Serge Gainsbourg	Arnold Goland	2:30
6.	"Il voyage"	Françoise Hardy	Françoise Hardy	2:14
Total length:				15:05

Side B
No.	Title	Lyrics	Music	Length
1.	"Loving You"	Jerry Leiber	Mike Stoller	2:13
2.	"L’Heure bleue"	Françoise Hardy	Françoise Hardy	1:49
3.	"Des ronds dans l’eau"	Pierre Barouh	Raymond Le Sénéchal	2:28
4.	"Avec des si"	Françoise Hardy	Françoise Hardy	3:03
5.	"Étonnez-moi Benoît...!"	Patrick Modiano	Hugues de Courson	2:56
6.	"Les Doigts dans la porte"	Eddy Marnay	Ariel Zilber	1:48
Total length:				14:30
