= Träume =

Studio album by Françoise Hardy
- Released: January 1970 (France)
- Studio: Studio CBE Paris, France
- Genre: Schlager
- Length: 29:45
- Language: German
- Label: Philips Records
- Producer: Françoise Hardy (Hypopotam Production)

Françoise Hardy chronology
One-Nine-Seven-Zero (1969)	Träume (1970)	Françoise (1970)

Packaging
- Gatefold cover with Pop-up.

Träume is the second and last studio album in German language by the French popular singer Françoise Hardy. Released only in Germany during January 1970. The record was published in no other country making it extremely rare and sought after.

== Track listing ==
Orchestras : Jean-Claude Petit (A1), Jean-Claude Vannier (A2-A5-B5), Jean-Pierre Sabar (A3-A4-B4-B6), Hans Hammerschmidt (A6-B1-B2), Saint-Preux (B1) and Charles Blackwell (B3).

Side A
No.	Title	Lyrics	Music	Length
1.	"Die roten Russenstiefel" (original title : Des bottes rouges de Russie)	Walter Brandin, Jean-Michel Rivat, Frank Thomas	André Popp	2:40
2.	"Bald ist so lange her" (original title : Soon Is Slipping Away)	Fred Jay	Tony Macaulay	2:46
3.	"Er muß reisen" (original title : Il voyage)	Walter Brandin	Françoise Hardy	2:09
4.	"Fremde Schatten" (original title : Strange Shadows)	Peter Lach	Tommy Brown	2:07
5.	"Das tut weh" (original title : Les Doigts dans la porte)	Max Colpet	Ariel Silber	1:48
6.	"Souvenirs der ersten großen Liebe"	Ralf Arnie	Klaus Munro	2:39
Total length:				14:15

Side B
No.	Title	Lyrics	Music	Length
1.	"Träume"	Fred Weyrich	Martin Böttcher	3:06
2.	"Einmal, wenn du gehst"	Udo Jürgens	Udo Jürgens	2:10
3.	"Zeig mir bei Nacht die Sterne" (original title: Je t'appartiens)	Hans Bradtke	Gilbert Bécaud	2:40
4.	"Was mach' ich ohne dich" (original title: It Hurts to Say Goodbye)	Walter Brandin	Arnold Goland	2:03
5.	"Wie im Kreis" (original title: All Because of You)	Klaus Munro	Scott English	2:25
6.	"Höre auf den Nachtwind" (original title: Song of Winter)	Dieter Rasch/Ralf Arnie	Tommy Brown	2:54
Total length:				15:30
