= Mon amie la rose (album) =

Studio album by Françoise Hardy
- Released: October 1964 (France)
- Recorded: Studio Pye; London, United Kingdom
- Genre: French pop
- Length: 29:24
- Language: French
- Label: Disques Vogue
- Producer: Jacques Wolfsohn

Françoise Hardy chronology
Françoise Hardy canta per voi in italiano (1963)	Mon amie la rose (1964)	In Deutschland (1965)

Alternative covers
- Australian & New Zealand cover (1965)

Alternative cover
- American cover (1966)

Professional ratings
Review scores
Source	Rating
Record Mirror	5/5 stars

Mon amie la rose is a studio album by the French popular singer Françoise Hardy, released in France in November 1964 on LP Disques Vogue (FH 2). Published without a title except for her name on the cover this album has colloquially become known by the title of its most successful song, "Mon amie la rose" ("My friend The Rose").

Hardy recorded an English version of "Dans le monde entier", titled "All Over the World". In 1965, this song reached the charts in the United Kingdom, remaining there for 15 weeks (in the Top 50 from 25 March to 8 July 1965 - in the Top 20 from 29 April till 3 June). In the Anglophone world, this may be Hardy's best-known song.

== Track listing ==
Except as noted, lyrics and music were written by Hardy. She is accompanied by the Charles Blackwell Orchestra, except for the song "Pourtant tu m’aimes", where she is accompanied by Mickey Baker.

1. "Je veux qu’il revienne" (original title: "Only You Can Do It", lyrics and music: B. Well alias Charles Blackwell) – 2:41
  First performed by: The Vernons Girls, 1964, French adaptation: Françoise Hardy
2. "Tu n’as qu’un mot à dire" – 2:42
3. "Tu ne dis rien" – 2:15
4. "Et même" – 2:00
5. "Pourtant tu m’aimes" (original title: "I Still Love Him", lyrics: Jimmy Cross; music: Johnny Cole) – 2:21
  First performed by: Joys, 1962, French adaptation: Françoise Hardy
6. "Pars" – 2:15
7. "Je n’attends plus personne" (original title: "Non aspetto nessuno", lyrics: Maccia; music: Antonio Ciacci) – 3:09
  First performed by: Little Tony, October 1964, French adaptation: Françoise Hardy
8. "La nuit est sur la ville" – 2:17
9. "Pas gentille" (original title: "Bad Boy", lyrics and music: Marty Wilde) – 2:20, First performed by: Marty Wilde, December 1959, French adaptation: Françoise Hardy
10. "Dans le monde entier" – 2:31
11. "Nous étions amies" (original title: "Eravamo amici", lyrics: Rossi; music: C. Combo) – 2:35
  First performed by: Dino, October 1964, French adaptation: Françoise Hardy
12. "Mon amie la rose" (lyrics: Cécile Caulier; music: Cécile Caulier, Jacques Lacome) – 2:17

== Editions ==
=== LP records: first editions in the English-speaking world ===
- Canada, 1964: Disques Vogue (VF-47015).
- United Kingdom, 1964: Disques Vogue (VRL 3000).
- Australia, 1965: Fantastic Françoise, Disques Vogue (SVL 933.200).
- New Zealand, 1965: Fantastic Françoise, disques Vogue (SVL 833.200).
- South Africa, 1965: Disques Vogue (VGL 7005).
- United States, 1966: Maid in Paris, 4 Corners of the World (FCL-4219).

=== Reissues on CD ===
- France, 1996: Disques Vogue/Sony-BMG (7432 1 380042).
- France, 2015: Mon amie la rose, RDM Edition (CD827).
- USA, 16 October 2015: Mon amie la rose, Light in the Attic Records/Future Days Recordings (FDR 616).

=== Reissue on 180g Vinyl ===
- USA, January 2016: Mon amie la rose, Light in the Attic Records/Future Days Recordings (FDR 616).
