= One-Nine-Seven-Zero =

Studio album by Françoise Hardy
- Released: October 1969 (UK)
- Recorded: Studio CBE, Paris; France
- Genre: French pop
- Length: 32:54
- Language: English
- Label: United Artists Records
- Producer: Françoise Hardy (Asparagus Production)

Françoise Hardy chronology
Françoise Hardy (1968)	One-Nine-Seven-Zero (1969)	Träume (1970)

Alternative cover
- American & Canadian cover (1970)

One-Nine-Seven-Zero is the third English-language studio album by French singer Françoise Hardy. First edition released in United Kingdom, in October 1969, on LP, Asparagus Production/United Artists Records (UAS 29046).

== Track list ==
Françoise Hardy is accompanied by orchestras under the direction of Jean-Pierre Sabar (A1-A2-A3-B2-B3-B4-B5-B6), Jean-Claude Vannier (A4-A6), John Cameron (A5) and Saint-Preux (B1).

Side A
No.	Title	Lyrics	Music	Length
1.	"Song of Winter"	Micky Jones	Tommy Brown	3:00
2.	"Magic Horse"	Micky Jones	Tommy Brown	3:09
3.	"Strange Shadows"	Micky Jones	Tommy Brown	2:08
4.	"All Because of You"	Mark Barkan	Scott English	2:29
5.	"Suzanne"	Leonard Cohen	Leonard Cohen	3:15
6.	"Soon Is Slipping Away"	Tony Macaulay	Tony Macaulay	2:54
Total length:				17:31‘’

Side B
No.	Title	Lyrics	Music	Length
1.	"Sunshine"	Tash Howard	Sandy Alpert	3:43
2.	"I Just Want to Be Alone" (original title: "J’ai coupé le téléphone")	ad. by Pierre Tubbs	Françoise Hardy	2:00
3.	"Times Passing By" (original title: "Au fil des nuits et des journées")	ad. by Pierre Tubbs	Françoise Hardy	2:05
4.	"Midnight Blues" (original title: "L’Heure bleue")	ad. by Pierre Tubbs	Françoise Hardy	1:49
5.	"In The Sky" (original title: "Il voyage")	ad. by Pierre Tubbs	Françoise Hardy	2:07
6.	"Why Even Try?" (original title: "À quoi ça sert ?")	ad. by Alan Clayre	Françoise Hardy	3:30
Total length:				15:23

== Editions ==
=== LP records: first editions in the English-speaking world ===
- South Africa, 1969: English 3, World Record Co. (ORR 6057).
- Australia, 1970: One-Nine-Seven-Zero, Interfusion (SITFL-933891).
- Canada, 1970: Alone, Reprise records (RS 6397).
- New Zealand, 1970: One-Nine-Seven-Zero, Interfusion (SITFL 933 891).
- United States, 1970: Alone, Reprise records (RS 6397).

=== Reissues on CD ===
- Great Britain, 2000: The Françoise Hardy Collection, His Master's Voice/EMI Records (7243 5 26054 2 2).
- Great Britain, 2013: CD, Midnight Blues – Paris . London . 1968-72, Ace International (CDCHD 1358).
