= All Over the World (Françoise Hardy song) =

1965 song by Françoise Hardy

- Original "All Over the World" 45 rpm

Single by Françoise Hardy
- B-side: "Another Place"
- Released: 12 March 1965
- Recorded: Pye studio, London
- Genre: pop music
- Length: 4:31
- Label: Pye Records
- Songwriter: Françoise Hardy (music) - Julian More (adaptation)
- Producer: Jacques Wolfsohn

Françoise Hardy
- English cover

EP by Françoise Hardy
- Released: March 1966
- Recorded: Pye Studios, London
- Genre: Pop music
- Length: 9:24
- Label: Disques Vogue-Vogue international industries
- Producer: Jacques Wolfsohn

Alternative cover
- French cover

"All Over the World" is a 1965 song by the French singer Françoise Hardy.

== History ==
The song was first recorded (lyrics and music) in French by Françoise Hardy in 1964 under the title "Dans le monde entier", featured on the album Mon amie la rose (catalogue number CLD 699.30). It was released in France in October 1964. Translated into English by Julian More under the title "All Over the World", it was released in the United Kingdom as a single on 12 March 1965 by Pye Records.

- Extended play (EP), in March 1966 by Disques Vogue-Vogue international industries.
- Long Play (LP), Françoise Hardy Sings in English in May 1966 by Disques Vogue-Vogue International Industries.

On March 25, 1965, the song reached the top 50 in the United Kingdom and remained there for 15 weeks (until 8 July — and in the top 20 from April 29 to June 3). "All Over the World" became one of Hardy's most popular songs and is her best known song in the Anglophone world.

British publication's cover containing the Sheet music and lyrics of "All Over the World".

== Single track listing ==
Accompaniment directed by Charles Blackwell orchestra.

Side one
No.	Title	Lyrics	Music	Length
1.	"All over the World" (original title: "Dans le monde entier")	ad. Julian More	Françoise Hardy	2:29

Side two
No.	Title	Lyrics	Music	Length
2.	"Another Place" (original title: "La nuit est sur la ville")	ad. Julian More	Françoise Hardy	2:02

== UK chart performance ==
- Entry Date: 25 March 1965 (41st)
- Highest Position: 16th (3 June: 1965)
- Weeks in Chart: 15 Weeks (25 March - 8 July 1965)

== EP track listing ==
Accompaniment directed by Charles Blackwell orchestra.

Side one
No.	Title	Lyrics	Music	Length
1.	"Autumn Rendezvous" (original title: "Rendez-vous d’automne")	ad. by Meredith	Gérard Bourgeois	2:40
2.	"Another Place" (original title: "La nuit est sur la ville")	ad. Julian More	Françoise Hardy	2:02
Total length:				4:42

Side two
No.	Title	Lyrics	Music	Length
1.	"Say It Now" (original title: "Dis Lui Non")	Robert Douglas Skelton	Robert Douglas Skelton	2:13
2.	"All over the World" (original title: "Dans le monde entier")	ad. Julian More	Françoise Hardy	2:29
Total length:				4:42

== Cover version ==
- 1965: Zsuzsa Koncz, EP Qualiton, EP 7346
- 1966: The Seekers, Album, Come the Day, LP EMI, SCX 6093
- 1967: Noeleen Batley, EP Festival Records, FK 1641
- 1977: Tracy Huang, Album, I Don't Want To Talk About It, LP EMI, Singapore, Malaysia & Hong Kong, EMGS 5012
- 1989: Neoton Familia, Album, Intim Percek, Profil – SLPM 37259
- 2012: Katie Melua, CD, Secret Symphony, Dramatico.

== Film score ==
- April 2009: The Boat That Rocked, written and directed by Richard Curtis

== See also ==
- Mon amie la rose
- Françoise Hardy Sings in English
