= Françoise Hardy (1963 album) =

Le premier bonheur du jour

Studio album by Françoise Hardy
- Released: October 1963 (France)
- Recorded: Studio Vogue; Villetaneuse, France
- Genre: French pop
- Length: 26:00
- Language: French
- Label: Disques Vogue
- Producer: Jacques Wolfsohn

Françoise Hardy chronology
Tous les garçons et les filles (1962)	Le premier bonheur du jour (1963)	Françoise Hardy canta per voi in italiano (1963)

Alternative cover
- English cover (1964)

Françoise Hardy is the second studio album of the French popular singer Françoise Hardy, released in October 1963 on LP by French label Disques Vogue (FH 1). She was accompanied by the Marcel Hendrix Orchestra. Like Hardy's previous album, the album was released with no title, except for her name on the cover; as such, album colloquially become known by the title of its most successful song, "Le Premier Bonheur du jour" ("The First Joy of the Day").

"Le premier bonheur du jour" was covered by Brazilian band Os Mutantes on their debut 1968 album, and decades later on the 2014 album Dream a Little Dream by Pink Martini and The von Trapps.

== Track listing ==
All lyrics are written by Françoise Hardy; all music is composed by Françoise Hardy, except where noted

No.	Title	Lyrics	Music	Length
1.	"Le premier bonheur du jour"	Franck Gérald	Jean Renard	1:53
2.	"Va pas prendre un tambour"	Maurice Vidalin	Jacques Dutronc	2:50
3.	"Saurai-je?"			2:05
4.	"Toi je ne t'oublierai pas"	André Salvet, Claude Carrère	Jean-Pierre Bourtayre	2:24
5.	"Avant de t'en aller" (original title: "Think About It")		Paul Anka	1:57
6.	"Comme tant d'autres"			2:35
7.	"J'aurais voulu"			2:10
8.	"Nous tous"			1:43
9.	"L'Amour d'un garçon" (original title: "The Love of a Boy")		Burt Bacharach	2:10
10.	"Le sais-tu?"			1:44
11.	"L'amour ne dure pas toujours"			1:45
12.	"On dit de lui" (original title: "It's Gonna Take Me Some Time")		Don Stirling, Harold Temkin	2:42
Total length:				25:58

== Editions ==
=== LP records: first editions in the English-speaking world ===
- Canada, 1964: Trans-Canada Record/Disques Vogue (FH 1).
- United Kingdom, 1964: In Vogue, Pye Records (NPL 18099).
- South Africa, 1965: Disques Vogue (VGL 7004).

=== Reissues on CD ===
- France, 1996: Disques Vogue/Sony/BMG (7 43213 80032).
- France, 2014: Le Premier Bonheur du jour, RDM Edition (CD687).
- USA, 16 October 2015: Le Premier Bonheur du jour, Light in the Attic Records/Future Days Recordings (FDR 615).

=== Reissue on 180g Vinyl ===
- USA, January 2016: Le Premier Bonheur du jour, Light in the Attic Records/Future Days Recordings (FH 1)-(FDR 615).
