= Sims Records =

American record label

- Founded: 1950s
- Founder: Russell Sims
- Country of origin: United States

Sims Records was an American country music record label in the 1950s and 1960s, which was resurrected in the late 1990s. Founded by Russell Sims, its roster included musical artists spanning country, gospel, and R&B, such as Patsy Montana, Carl Story, Floyd Tillman, Happy Goodman Family, Leon McAuliffe, Billy Parker, Johnnie Lee Wills, and Bob Wills.

== History ==
Russell Sims had been associated with Country music in the late 1940s and early 1950s and became a sort of touring manager for T. Texas Tyler who was a 4 Star Records artist. A meeting with Fabor Robison in 1951 allowed Sims to witness the birth of Robison's Abbott Records and Fabor labels and gave him the desire to start his own record company.

Sims Records began in Los Angeles in the early 1950s with a financial grant from Robison who was already successful with Jim Reeves and began to record local Country musicians. Sims was the first person to ever record Otis Redding. He was supposed to have been the first to record Patsy Cline, but in Mr. Sims’ words, “I couldn’t get to California fast enough. I got there too late and she signed with someone else”.

After an unsuccessful start, Sims relocated to Nashville in the early 1960s and began to add Black Gospel and R&B musicians to his roster. One of his releases by The Kelly Brothers sold well, but by the late 1968 Sims was running short of money and the company was put in "Mothballs".

In 1999 Sims re-opened his label with a multi-disc set of Bob Wills music.

== See also ==
- List of record labels
