= Françoise Hardy Sings in English =

Studio album by Françoise Hardy
- Released: September 1966 (United Kingdom)
- Recorded: Studio Pye; London
- Genre: Pop
- Length: 28:10
- Language: English
- Label: disques Vogue
- Producer: Jacques Wolfsohn

Françoise Hardy chronology
Françoise Hardy (1965)	Françoise Hardy Sings in English (1966)	La maison où j'ai grandi (1966)

Alternative covers
- Canadian cover (1966)

Alternative cover
- French cover (1966)

Professional ratings
Review scores
Source	Rating
Record Mirror	3/5 stars

Françoise Hardy Sings in English is a studio album of the French popular singer Françoise Hardy. It was released in United Kingdom in early September 1966, on LP, disques Vogue/Vogue international industries (VRL 3025), and in France, in the last week of the same month, on entitled LP, In English, disques Vogue/Vogue international industries (CLD 699. 30).

In 1965, the song "All Over The World" from this album reached the Top 50 in the United Kingdom, remaining in the Top 50 for 15 weeks and peaking at number 16 in the charts. In the English-speaking world, this may be Hardy's best-known song.

== Track listing ==
Hardy is accompanied by the Charles Blackwell Orchestra.

1. "This Little Heart" – 2:07
  Original title: "Ce petit cœur"
  Lyrics and music written by: Françoise Hardy
  English adaptation: Julian More
2. "All Over The World" – 2:29
  Original title: "Dans le monde entier"
  Lyrics and music written by: Françoise Hardy
  English adaptation: Julian More
3. "However Much" – 2:13
  Original title: "Et même"
  Lyrics and music written by: Françoise Hardy
  English adaptation: Julian More
4. "It's Getting Late" – 1:36
  Original title: "Il se fait tard"
  Lyrics and music written by: Françoise Hardy
  English adaptation: Meredith (Fabian Bohn and Pieter Heijnen)
5. "Only Friends" – 2:18
  Original title: "Ton meilleur ami"
  Lyrics and music written by: Françoise Hardy
  English adaptation: Miller
6. "Say It Now" – 2:13
  Lyrics and music written by: Robert Douglas Skelton
  First performed by: Bobby Skel (1964)
7. "Just Call and I'll Be There" – 2:28
  Lyrics and music written by: Charles Blackwell
  First performed by: P.J. Proby (1964)
8. "The Rose" – 2’ 15’’
  Original title: "Mon amie la rose"
  Lyrics by: Cécile Caulier; Music written by: Cécile Caulier and Jacques Lacombe
  English adaptation: Julian More
9. "Only You Can Do It" – 2’ 51’’
  Lyrics and music by: Charles Blackwell
  First performed by: The Vernons Girls (1964)
10. "It's My Heart" – 1:45
  Original title: "Tu peux bien"
  Lyrics and music written by: Françoise Hardy
  English adaptation: Meredith (Fabian Bohn and Pieter Heijnen)
11. "Another Place" – 2:02
  Original title: "La nuit est sur la ville"
  Lyrics and music written by: Françoise Hardy
  English adaptation: Julian More
12. "Autumn Rendez-vous" – 2:40
  Original title: "Rendez-vous d'automne"
  Lyrics by: Jean-Max Rivière; Music written by: Gérard Bourgeois
  English adaptation by: Meredith (Fabian Bohn and Pieter Heijnen)

== Editions ==
=== LP records: first editions in the English-speaking world ===
- Australia, 1966: Françoise Hardy Sings in English, Phono Vox/disques Vogue (LPV 219).
- Canada, 1966: Françoise Hardy Sings, disques Vogue (VF 47025).
- New Zealand, 1966: In English, Disques Vogue/Vogue international industries (SVL 933.391).
- South Africa, 1966: Françoise Hardy Sings in English, disques Vogue/Vogue international industries (VLG 7014).
- Hong Kong, 1967: In English, disques Vogue (CLD 699-30), stereo.

=== Reissues on CD ===
- United Kingdom, 1990: Françoise Hardy Sings in English, disques Vogue/Vogue international industries (CLD 699.30).
- France, 2009: In English, disques Vogue/Legacy Recordings/Sony Music (8 86975 62462 1).
