= L'amitié =

Studio album by Françoise Hardy
- Released: October 1965 (France)
- Studio: Studio Pye; London, United Kingdom
- Genre: French pop
- Length: 26:40
- Language: French
- Label: Disques Vogue
- Producer: Jacques Wolfsohn

Françoise Hardy chronology
In Deutschland (1965)	L'amitié (1965)	Françoise Hardy Sings in English (1966)

Alternative cover
- American cover (1966)

L'amitié is the fifth studio album by French singer-songwriter Françoise Hardy, released in November 1965 on Disques Vogue. Like many of her previous records, it was originally released without a title and came to be referred to, later on, by the name of its most popular song. The album includes several French adaptations of English-language songs, along with Hardy's own compositions.

== Track listing ==
Hardy is accompanied by the Charles Blackwell orchestra. Except as noted, lyrics and music were written by her.

1. "Ce petit cœur" – 2:10
2. "Il se fait tard" – 1:42
3. "Tout ce qu'on dit"
  Music written by: Tommy Brown
4. "L'amitié" – 2:23
  Lyrics by: Jean-Max Rivière
  Music written by: Gérard Bourgeois
5. "En t'attendant" – 1:46
6. "Je t'aime" – 2:00
  Music written by: Mick Jones
7. "Ce n'est pas un rêve" – 3:00
  Original title: "Don't Come Any Closer"
  Lyrics and music written by: Charles Blackwell
  First performed by Samantha Jones, 1964
  French adaptation by: Françoise Hardy
8. "Quel mal y a-t-il à ça?" – 2:36
  Original title: "When I Get Through With You"
  Lyrics and music written by: Harlan Howard
  First performed by: Patsy Cline, 1962
  French adaptation by: Françoise Hardy
9. "Tu peux bien" – 1:48
10. "Le temps des souvenirs" – 2:31
  Original title: "Just Call And I'll Be There"
  Lyrics and music written by: Charles Blackwell
  First performed by: P.J. Proby, 1964
  French adaptation by: Jacques Datin and Maurice Vidalin
11. "Je pensais" – 2:04
12. "Dis-lui non" – 2:26
  Original title: "Say It Now"
  Lyrics and music written by: Robert Douglas Skelton
  First performed by: Bobby Skel, 1964
  French adaptation by: Françoise Hardy

== Editions ==
=== LP records: first editions in the English-speaking world ===
- Australia, 1966: The Warm Romantic Voice of Françoise Hardy, Disques Vogue (SVL 933.201).
- Canada, 1966: L’Amitié, Disques Vogue (VC 6022).
- New Zealand, 1966: The Warm Romantic Voice of Françoise Hardy, Disques Vogue (SVL 933.201).
- South Africa, 1966: Disques Vogue (VGL 7010).
- United Kingdom, 1966: Disques Vogue (VRL 3021).
- United States, 1966: Françoise … Françoise Hardy, 4 Corners/Kapp Records (mono FCL-4231), (stéréo FCS-4231).

=== Reissues on CD ===
- France, 1996: Disques Vogue/Sony BMG (7-43213-80052-3).
- USA, 16 October 2015: L'Amitié, Light in the Attic Records/Future Days Recordings (FDR 617).

=== Reissue on 180 g vinyl ===
- USA, January 2016: L'Amitié, Light in the Attic Records/Future Days Recordings (FDR 617).

== Reception ==
Professional ratings
Review scores
Source	Rating
Pitchfork	(7.5/10)
Record Mirror	3/5 stars
