= Bobby Lee Trammell =

American singer and politician

Member of the Arkansas House of Representatives from the 88th district
- In office January 13, 1997 – January 13, 2003
- Preceded by: Claud Cash

Personal details
- Born: January 31, 1934 Jonesboro, Arkansas, U.S.
- Died: February 20, 2008 (aged 74) Jonesboro, Arkansas, U.S.
- Party: Democratic

Bobby Lee Trammell (January 31, 1934 – February 20, 2008) was an American rockabilly singer and politician.

== Biography ==
Trammell was born on a cotton farm near Jonesboro, Arkansas to Wiley and Mae Trammell, who were cotton farmers. Wiley played fiddle and Mae was an organist at a local church; in addition to these influences, Trammell also listened to the Grand Ole Opry and attended services at the local Pentecostal church, where gospel music was sung.

As a high schooler, Trammell played country music, and when Carl Perkins and Johnny Cash toured in Trammell's area in the middle of the 1950s, Perkins invited him to sing a song and told him to talk to Sam Phillips, owner of Sun Records. The meeting came to nothing, but Trammell moved to Long Beach, California soon after in hopes of landing a recording contract. While in California, he took a job in a Ford manufacturing plant. He saw Bobby Bare play at a carnival and convinced Bare to let him come on stage for a few songs. Lefty Frizzell, who was in attendance at the fair, asked him to open for a show at the Jubilee Ballroom, a venue in Baldwin Park, California. Trammell soon was performing there regularly, and won a reputation for Elvis Presley-like spastic gyrations and wildness on stage that occasionally caused controversy. Trammell said: "I was much wilder than Jerry Lee Lewis or Little Richard".

Manager/record label owner Fabor Robison signed Trammell to a contract, and he released his first single, containing the self-penned tunes "Shirley Lee" and "I Sure Do Love You, Baby". The recordings included session musicians James Burton on guitar and James Kirkland on bass. The single sold well and was picked up for national distribution by ABC/Paramount. The song never hit the national charts, but may have sold as many as 250,000 copies. Ricky Nelson covered "Shirley Lee" soon after.

Trammell's career then went through a series of mishaps. He auditioned for The Adventures of Ozzie and Harriet, but was not offered a spot. Ricky Nelson had expressed interest in looking at more of Trammell's work, but Trammell did not take the offer seriously. During the recording of his second single, "You're the Mostest Girl", he was backed by an orchestra and chorus, and he nearly quit his contract over the difficult recording session. Both this single and its follow-up, "My Susie J - My Susie Jane", failed to chart, and by the end of the 1950s, Trammell was performing strictly local dates in California. He staged a protest on the top of a broadcast tower in Los Angeles, against a radio station's refusal to play his record, but when the structure began to collapse, he had to be rescued by local authorities, and was barred from performing in the state.

After returning to Arkansas, Trammell sparred with Jerry Lee Lewis before a gig and destroyed Lewis's piano. After stories of Trammell's misbehavior made the rounds among promoters, he was effectively blackballed as a public performer everywhere.

Trammell continued recording for small local labels, but his reputation prevented him from getting much radio airplay. He self-distributed the records from his car in the 1960s. He was offered licensing contracts with Warner Bros. Records and others, but he refused them; he recorded for Sims Records through the end of the 1960s. In the 1970s, he played country music, and in the 1980s, he found some success in Europe during the rockabilly revival there. However, at the Rockhouse festival in Eindhoven, the Netherlands, he tried to jump onto his piano but fell, breaking his wrist in the process.

In 1997, Trammell was elected to the Arkansas House of Representatives, where he served until 2002. He unsuccessfully sought a State Senate seat in 2002, losing to Jerry Bookout. He died on February 20, 2008, in his birthplace of Jonesboro.
