= Four Corners Records =

Four Corners Records (rendered on its logo as 4 Corners of the World) was a sublabel of Kapp Records founded in 1964 which specialized in world music. They had four chart singles which were by the "You Know Who" Group, The Kids Next Door, Gunter Kallman and Raymond Lefevre. The label lasted until 1969.
